= AfroBasket 2007 squads =

2007 FIBA Africa Championship squads

Below is a list of team squads at the African Basketball Championships in 2007.

== Angola ==
- 4 - Olímpio Cipriano - (Primeiro de Agosto) (Angola)
- 5 - Armando Costa - (Primeiro de Agosto) (Angola)
- 6 - Carlos Morais - (Petro Atlético) (Angola)
- 7 - Mílton Barros - (Petro Atlético) (Angola)
- 8 - Luis Costa - (Petro Atlético) (Angola)
- 9 - Victor de Carvalho - FC Gaia Basquetebol (Portugal)
- 10 - Joaquim Gomes - (Primeiro de Agosto) (Angola)
- 11 - Victor Muzadi - (Primeiro de Agosto) (Angola)
- 12 - Felizardo Ambrósio - (Primeiro de Agosto) (Angola)
- 13 - Carlos Almeida - (Primeiro de Agosto) (Angola)
- 14 - Miguel Lutonda - (Primeiro de Agosto) (Angola)
- 15 - Eduardo Mingas - (Petro Atlético) (Angola)

== Cape Verde ==
- António Moreira - (University of Massachusetts-Dartmouth) (United States)
- Odair Sanches
- Agildo Cabral - (Pantera Negra Sal) (Cape Verde)
- Aquiles Semedo - (ABC) (Cape Verde)
- Mário Correia - (Maia Basket) (Portugal)
- Antonio Monteiro
- Marques Houtman - (FC Porto) (Portugal)
- Aldevino Lima - (Benfica) (Portugal)
- Mário Jorge - (CAB Madeira) (Portugal)
- Victor Hugo - (ABC) (Cape Verde)
- Tony Barros - (University of Massachusetts-Boston) (United States)
- Rodrigo Mascarenhas - (Primeiro de Agosto) (Angola)

== Rwanda ==
- 4 - Valery Kajeguhakwa - (Patriotic Army) (Rwanda)
- 5 - Karim Nkusi
- 6 - Rene Gakari - (Patriotic Army) (Rwanda)
- 7 - Louis Mugunga
- 8 - Bertrand Muhire
- 9 - Manix Auriantal - (Quebec City Kebekwa) (Canada)
- 10 - Hamza Ruhezamihigo
- 11 - Trinon Mutabaruka
- 12 - Rob Thomson - (Makedonikos Kozani) (Greece)
- 13 - Gaylord Ndugu
- 14 - Edouard Miller
- 15 - Aboubakar Barame

== Morocco ==
- 4 - Soufiane Kourdou - (AS Sale) (Morocco)
- 5 - Mustapha Khalfi - (RCA Casablanca) (Morocco)
- 6 - Boutouris Zouheir - (ASS Rabat) (Morocco)
- 7 - Zakaria Masbahi - (TSC Casablanca) (Morocco)
- 8 - Nabil Bakkas - (MAS Fes) (Morocco)
- 9 - Mohamed Mouak - (FUS Rabat) (Morocco)
- 10 - Mounir Bouhlal - (IRT Tanger) (Morocco)
- 11 - Reda Rhalimi - (Al Gezira) (Egypt)
- 12 - Houari Bassim - (MAS Fes) (Morocco)
- 13 - Adnan Musaadia - (RCA Casablanca) (Morocco)
- 14 - Abderrahim Najah - (RCA Casablanca) (Morocco)
- 15 - Younes Idrissi - (Iona College) (United States)

== Senegal ==
- El Kabir Pene - (Stade Clermontois Basket Auvergne) (France)
- Alpha Traore - (MAS Fes) (Morocco)
- Mohammed Seck - (AS Douanes Dakar) (Senegal)
- Mouhammad Faye - (Georgia Tech) (United States)
- Bamba Fall - (Southern Methodist University) (United States)
- Maleye N'Doye - (JDA Dijon Bourgogne) (France)
- Mamadou Diouf - (Sendai 89ers) (Japan)
- Jules Aw - (Sion Herens Basket) (Switzerland)
- Issa Konare - (Vermont Frost Heaves) (United States)
- Pape Sow - (Solsonica Rieti) (Italy)
- Malick Badiane - (Artland Dragons Quakenbrueck) (Germany)
- Makhtar N'Diaye - (Levallois SCB) (France)

== Ivory Coast ==
- Guy Serge Toualy - (ABC Abidjan) (Ivory Coast)
- Philippe Koffi
- Cedric Kouadiou
- Souleyman Diabate - (JDA Dijon Bourgogne) (France)
- Stephane Konate - (ABC Abidjan) (Ivory Coast)
- Eric N'Tape - (ES Saint-Martin D'Heres) (France)
- Amadou Dioum - (Limoges CSP Elite) (France)
- Mamery Diallo - (Stade Clermontois Basket Auvergne) (France)
- Rodrigue Djahue - (Saint Vallier Basket Drome) (France)
- Serge Afeli - (Kansas State University) (United States)
- Bangoura Morlaye - (ABC Abidjan) (Ivory Coast)
- Ismael N'Diaye - (Florida International University) (United States)

== Mali ==
- Alou Badra Sanogo - (Djoliba Athletic Club) (Mali)
- Bassekou Diallo - (AS Real Bamako) (Mali)
- Lamine Diawara - (Al Ittihad Aleppo) (Syria)
- Modibo Diarra - (Cape Cod Frenzy) (United States)
- Modibo Niakate - (Chorale de Roanne Basket) (France)
- Namory Diarra - (Stade Malien) (Mali)
- Paul Dakouo - (Al Ahli Sports Club) (Qatar)
- Salif Niangado - (ASCC BOPP) (Senegal)
- Sory Diakite - (Al Nahda) (Saudi Arabia)
- Samake Soumaila - (Zhejiang Wanma Cyclones) (China)
- Waly Coulibaly - (Stade Malien) (Mali)
- Nouha Diakite - (Adecco ASVEL Lyon-Villeurbanne) (France)

== Egypt ==
- Ashraf Rabie - (Al Ittihad Alexandria) (Egypt)
- Ibrahim El Gamali - (Al Ahly) (Egypt)
- Karim Shamseia
- Mohamed El Garhy - (Al Ahly) (Egypt)
- Ramy Gunady - (Al Gezira) (Egypt)
- Tarek El Ghanam - (Al Ahly) (Egypt)
- Wael Badr - (Al Zamalek) (Egypt)
- Ahmed El-Said - (Al Zamalek) (Egypt)
- Sherif Smara
- Mohamed Mustafa
- Amir Fannan
- Mohamed El Manin

== Nigeria ==
- Abdulrahman Mohammed - (Kenney's Bullets) (Nigeria)
- Aloysius Anagonye - (Premiata Montegranaro) (Italy)
- Chamberlain Oguchi - (University of Oregon) (United States)
- Churchill Odia - (University of Oregon) (United States)
- Ibrahim Yusuf - (Dodan Warriors) (Nigeria)
- Ejike Ugboaja - (Ydra Asfalistiki ENAD Agios Dometios) (Cyprus)
- Abe Badmus - (Bucknell University) (United States)
- Deji Akindele - (Fort Worth Flyers) (United States)
- Olumide Oyedeji - (Al Kuwait SC)
- Stanley Gumut - (Yelwa Hawks Bauchi) (Nigeria)
- Tunji Awojobi - (Gilboa/Afula/Migdal Haemek) (Israel)

== Central African Republic ==
- Christian Siris - (AS Mazanga) (Central African Republic)
- Dieudonne Mbesse
- Fabrice Mokotemapa
- Guy Joseph Kodjo - (ES Prisse Macon) (France)
- Junior Madozein - (ASOPT) (Central African Republic)
- Junior Pehoua - (Hampton University) (United States)
- Lionel Bomayako - (Longwy-Rehon B.C.) (France)
- Max Mombollet - (Orcines) (France)
- Olivier Vivies - (JA Vichy Val d'Allier Auvergne) (France)
- Regis Koundjia - (The George Washington University) (United States)
- Asrangue Souleymane - (University of New Orleans) (United States)
- Severino Febou

== Liberia ==
- John Bing - (LPRC Oilers) (Liberia)
- Jethro Bing - (LPRC Oilers) (Liberia)
- Varney Tulay - (Dream Team) (Liberia)
- Marcus Wolo - (LPRC Oilers) (Liberia)
- Fitgerald Cole - (NPA Pythons) (Liberia)
- Alphonso Kuiah - (NPA Pythons) (Liberia)
- Raphael Quaye - (NPA Pythons) (Liberia)
- Alvin Tapeh - (NPA Pythons) (Liberia)
- Mark Smith - (NPA Pythons) (Liberia)
- Joseph Lackey - (Uhuru Kings) (Liberia)
- Richelieu Allison - (Uhuru Kings) (Liberia)
- Samuel Assembe - (Pretoria Heat) (South Africa)

== DR Congo ==
- Mali Alimasi - (Kauka Kinshasa) (Democratic Republic of the Congo)
- Tshimpaka Kadima - (InterClub Brazzaville) (Republic of the Congo)
- Gege Kizubanata - (ASA) (Angola)
- Mutombo Lukusa - (Onatra Kinshasa) (Democratic Republic of the Congo)
- Ndala Mutombo - (Kauka Kinshasa) (Democratic Republic of the Congo)
- Lifetu Selengue - (Interclube) (Angola)
- Yohan Lokanga
- Djo Yele - (Tshwane Suns) (South Africa)
- Eyenga Christian - (Onatra Kinshasa) (Democratic Republic of the Congo)
- Mabilama Samuna - (Onatra Kinshasa) (Democratic Republic of the Congo)
- Isasi Ndelo - (Onatra Kinshasa) (Democratic Republic of the Congo)
- Kabangu Tshimanga - (Mazembe Katanga) (Democratic Republic of the Congo)

== Mozambique ==
- Benjamin Manhanga - (Desportivo Maputo) (Mozambique)
- Custodio Muchate - (Clube Ferroviário de Maputo) (Mozambique)
- Edgar Machava
- Edson Monjane
- Fernando Mandlate - (Clube de Desportos do Maxaquene) (Mozambique)
- Helenio Machanguana
- Ivan Gouveia
- Luis Barros - (Associação Académica de Maputo) (Mozambique)
- Nelson Jossias
- Octavio Magolico - (Clube Ferroviário de Maputo) (Mozambique)
- Ricardo Alipio - (Clube Ferroviário de Maputo) (Mozambique)
- Stelio Nuaila

== Tunisia ==
- Ali Amri - (Club Africain) (Tunisia)
- Amine Rezig - (Stade Nabeulien) (Tunisia)
- Atef Maoua - (J.S.Kairouan) (Tunisia)
- Fouhed Stiti - (U.S.Monastir) (Tunisia)
- Hamdi Braa - (Étoile du Sahel) (Tunisia)
- Marwen Laghnej - (J.S.Kairouan) (Tunisia)
- Majdi Maalaouli - (Stade Nabeulien) (Tunisia)
- Naim Dhifallah - (Club Africain) (Tunisia)
- Nizar Knioua
- Omar Mouhli - (E.O.G.Kram) (Tunisia)
- Walid Dhouibi - (Étoile du Sahel) (Tunisia)
- Radhouane Slimane - (Étoile du Sahel) (Tunisia)

== Cameroon ==
- Alexandre N'Kembe - (La Rochelle Rupella 17) (France)
- Brice Vounang - (SPO Rouen Basket) (France)
- Christian Bayang - (Phoenix de Douala) (Cameroon)
- Jean-Pierre Elong
- Joachim Ekanga-Ehawa - (ES Chalon-Sur-Saone) (France)
- Joseph Owona - (JSA Bordeaux Basket) (France)
- Luc Richard Mbah a Moute - (University of California at Los Angeles) (United States)
- Franck Ndongo - (Virginia Commonwealth University) (United States)
- Parfait Bitee - (University of Rhode Island) (United States)
- Patrick Bouli - (Manhattan College) (United States)
- Romeo Dide Tatchoum - (Brinkford Tbilisi) (Georgia (country))
- Gaston Essengue - (University of Nevada - Las Vegas) (United States)

== South Africa ==
- Quintin Denyssen - (Egoli Magic) (South Africa)
- Neo Mothiba - (Soweto Panthers) (South Africa)
- Lesego Molebatsi - (Egoli Magic) (South Africa)
- Joseph Mazibuko - (Egoli Magic) (South Africa)
- Nyakallo Nthuping - (Tshwane Suns) (South Africa)
- Kenneth Motaung - (Soweto Panthers) (South Africa)
- Thabang Kgwedi - (Soweto Panthers) (South Africa)
- Patrick Engelbrecht
- Tsakane Ngobeni - (Hamilton College) (United States)
- Vusumuzi Dlamini - (Kwazulu Marlins) (South Africa)
- Lowell Mndaweni - (Kwazulu Marlins) (South Africa)
- Thabo Letsebe - (Soweto Panthers) (South Africa)

== See also ==
- 2007 FIBA Africa Championship for Women squads
