= FIBA World Olympic Qualifying Tournament for Men 2008 squads =

Below is a list of squads at the FIBA World Olympic Qualifying Tournament for Men 2008:

== Brazil ==
- Coach : (Spain) Moncho Monsalve

No	Player	Height	Position	Year born (Age)	Current Club
4	Marcelo Magalhães Machado	2.00	SF	April 12, 1975 (age 49)	(Brazil) Flamengo
5	Eduardo Magalhães Machado	1.91	SF	September 10, 1982 (age 42)	(Brazil) Flamengo
6	Murilo Becker	2.11	F/C	July 14, 1983 (age 41)	(Israel) Maccabi Tel Aviv
7	Ricardo Probst	2.00	SF	April 13, 1976 (age 48)	(Brazil) Conti/Assis
8	Fulvio Chiantia de Assis	1.87	G	August 15, 1981 (age 43)	(Italy) Pallacanestro Roseto
9	Marcelinho Huertas	1.91	PG	May 25, 1983 (age 41)	(Italy) Fortitudo Bologna
10	Alex Garcia	1.91	SG	March 4, 1980 (age 45)	(Brazil) Brasilia
11	Marcus Vinicius Urban Toledo dos Reis	2.03	F	July 10, 1986 (age 38)	(Spain) Plus Pujol Lleida
12	Rafael Araújo	2.11	C	August 12, 1980 (age 44)	Free agent
13	João Paulo Batista	2.08	C	October 29, 1981 (age 43)	(Latvia) Barons LMT
14	Jonathan Tavernari	1.96	F	June 18, 1987 (age 37)	(United States) Brigham Young University
15	Tiago Splitter	2.11	PF/C	January 1, 1985 (age 40)	(Spain) TAU Cerámica

== Cameroon ==
- Coach : (Cameroon) Lazare Adingono

No	Player	Height	Position	Year born (Age)	Current Club
4	Christian Bayang	1.92	SG	May 7, 1987 (age 37)	(Cameroon) BEAC
5	Cyrille Makanda	1.89	SG	May 5, 1980 (age 44)	(Cyprus) APOEL B.C.
6	Parfait Bitee	1.88	SG	July 23, 1985 (age 39)	(Belgium) Leuven Bears
7	Franck Ndongo	2.01	F	December 7, 1988 (age 36)	(Cameroon) SONARA
8	Harding Nana	2.03	PF	January 17, 1981 (age 44)	(Spain) Beirasar Rosalía
9	Joachim Ekanga-Ehawa	1.87	SG/SF	October 7, 1977 (age 47)	(France) Chalon-sur-Saône
10	Patrick Bouli	1.88	G	January 11, 1986 (age 39)	(United States) Manhattan College
11	Jean Pierre Leolain Elong Ebongue	1.85	SG	October 7, 1985 (age 39)	(Cameroon) BEAC
12	Brice Vounang	2.03	F/PF	December 3, 1982 (age 42)	(France) SPO Rouen
13	Alfred Aboya	2.03	PF/C	January 2, 1985 (age 40)	(United States) UCLA
14	Ruben Boumtje-Boumtje	2.12	C	May 20, 1978 (age 46)	(Germany) Oldenburg
15	Alexis Wangmene	2.03	F/PF	March 1, 1989 (age 36)	(United States) University of Texas

== Canada ==
- Coach : (Canada) Leo Rautins

No	Player	Height	Position	Year born (Age)	Current Club
4	Jermaine Anderson	1.86	PG	February 8, 1983 (age 42)	(Germany) Walter Tigers Tübingen
5	Tyler Kepkay	1.83	PG	June 19, 1987 (age 37)	(Hong Kong) Winling
6	Samuel Dalembert	2.11	C	May 10, 1980 (age 44)	(United States) Philadelphia 76ers
7	Olu Famutimi	1.96	SG/SF	February 21, 1984 (age 41)	(Ukraine) Khimik Yuzhny
8	Carl English	1.95	SG/SF	February 2, 1981 (age 44)	(Spain) Gran Canaria
9	Rowan Barrett	1.97	F	November 24, 1972 (age 52)	(France) Chalon-sur-Saône
10	Andy Rautins	1.98	SG	November 2, 1986 (age 38)	(United States) Syracuse University
11	Dave Thomas	2.04	SF	December 4, 1976 (age 48)	(Australia) Cairns Taipans
12	Aaron Doornekamp	1.98	F	December 5, 1985 (age 39)	(Canada) Carleton University
13	Rans Brempong	2.04	PF	July 22, 1981 (age 43)	(Germany) Bayer Giants Leverkusen
14	Levon Kendall	2.10	PF	July 4, 1984 (age 40)	(Greece) Panionios Forthnet
15	Joel Anthony	2.06	C	August 9, 1982 (age 42)	(United States) Miami Heat

== Cape Verde ==
Coach : (Cape Verde) Eric Silva

No	Player	Height	Position	Year born (Age)	Current Club
4	Jeff Xavier	1.85	PG	September 7, 1985 (age 39)	(United States) Providence College
5	Josh Gomes	1.90	PG/SG	December 10, 1983 (age 41)	(Israel) Baitar Benyamina
6	Abdulay Faty	2.05	C	January 14, 1985 (age 40)	(Angola) Desportivo da Huíla
7	Fidel Mendonca	1.91	F	July 7, 1984 (age 40)	(Portugal) Olivais Coimbra
8	Mário Correia	1.89	SG	March 17, 1978 (age 47)	(Angola) Promade Cabinda
9	Antonio Monteiro	1.92	F	July 19, 1975 (age 49)	
10	Marques Houtman	1.90	PG	August 18, 1979 (age 45)	(Angola) Clube Desportivo Primeiro de Agosto
11	Aldevino Lima	2.03	C	August 25, 1986 (age 38)	(United States) Northeastern University
12	Peter Cipriano	2.06	PF/C	February 7, 1983 (age 42)	(Finland) Kouvot Kouvola
13	Avery Oliver	1.93	SG/F	October 12, 1983 (age 41)	(Germany) TV Hohenlimburg
14	Tony Barros	1.90	SG/SF	May 3, 1984 (age 40)	(United States) University of Massachusetts Boston
15	Rodrigo Mascarenhas	1.97	F	March 24, 1980 (age 44)	(Angola) Clube Desportivo Primeiro de Agosto

== Croatia ==
Coach : (Croatia) Jasmin Repeša

No	Player	Height	Position	Year born (Age)	Current Club
4	Roko Leni Ukić	1.95	PG	December 5, 1984 (age 40)	(Canada) Toronto Raptors
5	Davor Kus	1.91	PG/SG	July 21, 1978 (age 46)	(Spain) Unicaja Málaga
6	Marko Popović	1.85	PG	June 12, 1982 (age 42)	(Lithuania) Zalgiris Kaunas
7	Marin Rozić	2.03	SF	February 14, 1983 (age 42)	(Croatia) Cibona Zagreb
8	Nikola Prkačin	2.08	PF	November 15, 1975 (age 49)	(Croatia) Cibona Zagreb
9	Marko Tomas	2.01	SG/SF	January 3, 1985 (age 40)	(Spain) Real Madrid
10	Zoran Planinić	1.99	PG	September 12, 1982 (age 42)	(Russia) CSKA Moscow
11	Sandro Nicević	2.11	C	June 16, 1976 (age 48)	(Italy) Benetton Treviso
12	Damir Markota	2.09	SF/PF	December 26, 1985 (age 39)	(Lithuania) Zalgiris Kaunas
13	Marko Banić	2.04	PF	August 31, 1984 (age 40)	(Spain) Iurbentia Bilbao
14	Krešimir Lončar	2.10	C	February 12, 1983 (age 42)	(Russia) Lokomotiv Rostov
15	Stanko Barać	2.17	C	August 13, 1986 (age 38)	(Spain) Pamesa Valencia

== Germany ==
Coach : (Germany) Dirk Bauermann

No	Player	Height	Position	Year born (Age)	Current Club
4	Tim Ohlbrecht	2.10	PF	August 30, 1988 (age 36)	(Germany) Brose Baskets
5	Philip Zwiener	2.01	F	July 23, 1985 (age 39)	(Germany) ALBA Berlin
6	Sven Schultze	2.08	PF	July 11, 1978 (age 46)	(Italy) Snaidero Cucine Udine
7	Robert Garrett	1.93	SG	March 18, 1977 (age 48)	(Germany) Brose Baskets
8	Konrad Wysocki	2.04	SF	March 28, 1983 (age 41)	(Germany) Deutsche Bank Skyliners
9	Steffen Hamann	1.96	PG	June 14, 1981 (age 43)	(Germany) ALBA Berlin
10	Demond Greene	1.86	SG	June 15, 1979 (age 45)	(Germany) Brose Baskets
11	Pascal Roller	1.80	PG	November 20, 1976 (age 48)	(Germany) Deutsche Bank Skyliners
12	Chris Kaman	2.13	C	April 28, 1982 (age 42)	(United States) Los Angeles Clippers
13	Patrick Femerling	2.15	C	March 4, 1975 (age 50)	(Germany) ALBA Berlin
14	Dirk Nowitzki	2.13	PF	June 19, 1978 (age 46)	(United States) Dallas Mavericks
15	Jan-Hendrik Jagla	2.13	PF/C	June 25, 1981 (age 43)	(Spain) Joventut Badalona

== Greece ==
Coach : (Greece) Panagiotis Giannakis

No	Player	Height	Position	Year born (Age)	Current Club
4	Theodoros Papaloukas	2.00	PG	May 8, 1977 (age 47)	(Greece) Olympiacos
5	Ioannis Bourousis	2.15	C	November 17, 1983 (age 41)	(Greece) Olympiacos
6	Nikos Zisis	1.97	G	August 16, 1983 (age 41)	(Russia) CSKA Moscow
7	Vassilis Spanoulis	1.93	G	August 7, 1982 (age 42)	(Greece) Panathinaikos
8	Panagiotis Vasilopoulos	2.05	F	February 8, 1984 (age 41)	(Greece) Olympiacos
9	Antonis Fotsis	2.09	PF	April 1, 1981 (age 43)	(Greece) Panathinaikos
10	Giorgos Printezis	2.06	PF	February 22, 1985 (age 40)	(Greece) Olympiacos
11	Andreas Glyniadakis	2.16	C	August 26, 1981 (age 43)	(Greece) Maroussi
12	Kostas Tsartsaris	2.10	PF/C	October 17, 1979 (age 45)	(Greece) Panathinaikos
13	Dimitris Diamantidis	1.96	G	May 6, 1980 (age 44)	(Greece) Panathinaikos
14	Sofoklis Schortsanitis	2.08	C	June 22, 1985 (age 39)	(Greece) Olympiacos
15	Michalis Pelekanos	1.99	G/F	May 25, 1981 (age 43)	(Greece) Olympiacos

== Korea ==
- Coach : (South Korea) Kim Nam-Gi

No	Player	Height	Position	Year born (Age)	Current Club
4	Ha Seung-Jin	2.21	C	August 4, 1985 (age 39)	
5	Jung Young-Sam	1.87	SG/SF	April 21, 1984 (age 40)	(South Korea) Incheon ET Land Black Slamer
6	Lee Kwang-Jae	1.88	SG/SF	April 21, 1984 (age 40)	(South Korea) Dongbu Promy
7	Kim Tae-Sool	1.80	PG	August 13, 1984 (age 40)	(South Korea) Seoul SK Knights
8	Jeon Jung-Gyu	1.88	SG	October 14, 1983 (age 41)	(South Korea) Incheon ET Land Black Slamer
9	Joo Hee-Jung	1.82	PG	February 4, 1977 (age 48)	(South Korea) Anyang KT&G Kites
10	Kang Byung-Hyun	1.92	PG/SG	May 5, 1985 (age 39)	(South Korea) Chung-Ang University
11	Yang Hee-Jong	1.94	SF	May 11, 1984 (age 40)	(South Korea) Anyang KT&G Kites
12	Oh Sekeun	2.01	C	May 20, 1987 (age 37)	(South Korea) Chung-Ang University
13	Yoon Ho-Young	1.96	SF	June 1, 1984 (age 40)	(South Korea) Chung-Ang University
14	Kim Joo-Sung	2.05	C	November 9, 1979 (age 45)	(South Korea) Dongbu Promy
15	Kim Min-Soo	2.00	PF	January 16, 1982 (age 43)	(South Korea) Seoul SK Knights

== Lebanon ==
- Coach : (Lebanon) Fuad Abou Chakra

No	Player	Height	Position	Year born (Age)	Current Club
4	Jean Abdel-Nour	1.98	SF	November 29, 1983 (age 41)	(Lebanon) Bluestars
5	Mazen Mneimneh	1.92	SG	February 1, 1986 (age 39)	(Lebanon) Sporting Al Riyadi Beirut
6	Ali Mahmoud	1.82	PG	May 28, 1983 (age 41)	(Lebanon) Sporting Al Riyadi Beirut
7	Rony Fahed	1.84	PG	November 6, 1981 (age 43)	(Lebanon) Sagesse Beirut
8	Omar El Turk	1.84	PG	September 30, 1981 (age 43)	(Lebanon) Sporting Al Riyadi Beirut
9	Brian Anthony Beshara Feghali	2.04	SF/PF	December 30, 1977 (age 47)	(Lebanon) Al Mouttahed Tripoli
10	Roy Samaha	2.05	C	September 12, 1984 (age 40)	(Lebanon) Bluestars
11	Bassem Balaa	1.98	F	July 10, 1981 (age 43)	(Lebanon) Bluestars
12	Ali Fakhreddine	2.02	PF/C	April 3, 1983 (age 41)	(Lebanon) Sporting Al Riyadi Beirut
13	Sabah Khoury	1.96	SG	November 10, 1982 (age 42)	(Lebanon) Sagesse Beirut
14	Hussein Tawbe	1.95	PF	July 16, 1982 (age 42)	(Lebanon) Sporting Al Riyadi Beirut
15	Fadi El Khatib	1.98	SG/SF	January 1, 1979 (age 46)	(Lebanon) Sporting Al Riyadi Beirut

== New Zealand ==
- Coach : (New Zealand) Nenad Vucinic

No	Player	Height	Position	Year born (Age)	Current Club
4	Lindsay Tait	1.90	G	January 8, 1982 (age 43)	(New Zealand) Wellington Saints
5	Michael Fitchett	1.83	PG	September 20, 1982 (age 42)	(New Zealand) Nelson Giants
6	Kirk Penney	1.95	G	November 23, 1980 (age 44)	(Australia) New Zealand Breakers
7	Mika Vukona	1.93	F	May 13, 1982 (age 42)	(Australia) South Dragons
8	Jeremy Kench	1.86	PG	April 27, 1984 (age 40)	(New Zealand) Canterbury Rams
9	Paora Winitana	1.95	G	December 6, 1976 (age 48)	(New Zealand) Hawke's Bay Hawks
10	Alex Pledger	2.16	C	March 27, 1987 (age 37)	(United States) University of Missouri–Kansas City
11	Pero Cameron	1.98	F	June 5, 1974 (age 50)	(Australia) Gold Coast Blaze
12	Corey Webster		G	November 29, 1988 (age 36)	(United States) Lambuth University
13	Nick Horvath	2.08	C	February 18, 1981 (age 44)	(New Zealand) Wellington Saints
14	Craig Bradshaw	2.05	C	July 28, 1983 (age 41)	(Australia) Brisbane Bullets
15	Ben Hill	1.96	F	June 18, 1979 (age 45)	(New Zealand) Waikato Pistons

== Puerto Rico ==
- Coach : (Puerto Rico) Manolo Cintron

No	Player	Height	Position	Year born (Age)	Current Club
4	Peter John Ramos	2.22	C	May 23, 1985 (age 39)	(Puerto Rico) Criollos de Caguas
5	José Juan Barea	1.83	PG	June 26, 1984 (age 40)	(United States) Dallas Mavericks
6	Filiberto Rivera	1.87	PG	September 28, 1982 (age 42)	(Greece) AEK Athens
7	Carlos Arroyo	1.88	PG	July 30, 1979 (age 45)	(United States) Orlando Magic
8	Joel Jones	1.98	G	July 17, 1981 (age 43)	(Puerto Rico) Ponce Lions
9	Alex Falcón	2.00	SF/PF	November 20, 1973 (age 51)	(Puerto Rico) Santurce Crabbers
10	Larry Ayuso	1.90	SG	March 27, 1977 (age 47)	(Croatia) Cibona Zagreb
11	Ricardo Sanchez	2.12	C	July 6, 1987 (age 37)	(United States) Idaho Stampede
12	Javier Mojica	1.86	G	August 31, 1984 (age 40)	(Puerto Rico) Fajardo Cariduros
13	Luis Villalfañe	2.08	C	June 21, 1981 (age 43)	(Puerto Rico) Gigantes de Carolina
14	Carmelo Antrone Lee	2.00	SF	June 7, 1977 (age 47)	(Puerto Rico) Guaynabo Conquistadores
15	Daniel Santiago	2.16	C	June 24, 1976 (age 48)	(Spain) Unicaja Malaga

== Slovenia ==
- Coach : (Slovenia) Aleš Pipan

No	Player	Height	Position	Year born (Age)	Current Club
4	Željko Zagorac	2.04	F/C	March 9, 1981 (age 44)	(Slovenia) Helios Domžale
5	Jaka Lakovič	1.86	PG	July 9, 1978 (age 46)	(Spain) FC Barcelona
6	Jaka Klobučar	1.99	PG/SG	August 19, 1987 (age 37)	(Slovenia) Union Olimpija
7	Sani Bečirovič	1.95	SG	May 19, 1981 (age 43)	(Italy) Lottomatica Roma
8	Rasho Nesterovič	2.13	C	May 30, 1976 (age 48)	(United States) Indiana Pacers
9	Goran Dragić	1.90	PG	May 6, 1986 (age 38)	(Slovenia) Union Olimpija
10	Uroš Slokar	2.06	PF/C	May 14, 1983 (age 41)	(Russia) Triumph Lyubertsy
11	Nebojša Joksimović	1.93	SG	November 17, 1981 (age 43)	(Serbia) Hemofarm
12	Emir Preldžič	2.06	SF/PF	September 6, 1987 (age 37)	(Turkey) Fenerbahçe
13	Domen Lorbek	1.98	SG	March 6, 1985 (age 40)	(Spain) MMT Estudiantes
14	Dragisa Drobnjak	2.00	F	November 5, 1977 (age 47)	(Poland) Turów Zgorzelec
15	Miha Zupan	2.06	PF/C	September 13, 1982 (age 42)	(Slovenia) Union Olimpija
