= 2007 FIBA Africa Clubs Champions Cup squads =

This article displays the rosters for the participating teams at the 2006 FIBA Africa Club Championship.

== (Ivory Coast) Abidjan Basket Club ==
Abidjan Basket Club – 2007 FIBA Africa Clubs Champions Cup – Bronze medal roster
| Players | | | | | | | Coaches |
| Pos | # | Nat | Name | Height | Weight | Age | Head Coach |
| | 4 | (Ivory Coast) | Ange Tiene | | | 1 January 1985 (aged 22) | (Ivory Coast) Djadji Clément |
| | 5 | (Ivory Coast) | Pierre Gbotto | | | 18 August 1982 (aged 25) |
| | 6 | (Ivory Coast) | Asshe Kokoun | | | 28 December 1985 (aged 21) | Assistant coach(es) |
| | 7 | (Ivory Coast) | Jean Besse | | | 16 January 1978 (aged 29) |
| | 8 | (Nigeria) | Dennis Ebikoro | | | 30 August 1988 (aged 19) |
| | 9 | (Ivory Coast) | Eric Affi | | | 1 January 1982 (aged 25) |
| | 10 | (Ivory Coast) | Kouamé Abo | | | 26 October 1985 (aged 22) |
| | 11 | (Ivory Coast) | Aka Diamah | | | 10 September 1984 (aged 23) |
| | 12 | (Ivory Coast) | Kevin Ninmol | | | 9 November 1985 (aged 22) |
| | 13 | (Ivory Coast) | Blaise Amalabian | | | 3 February 1974 (aged 33) |
| | 14 | (Ivory Coast) | Guy Touali | | | 29 April 1974 (aged 33) |
| | 15 | (Ivory Coast) | Stéphane Konaté | 1.93 m (6 ft 4 in) | 80 kg (180 lb) | 23 August 1980 (aged 27) |

== (Rwanda) APR ==
APR – 2007 FIBA Africa Clubs Champions Cup – 6th place roster
| Players | | | | | | | Coaches |
| Pos | # | Nat | Name | Height | Weight | Age | Head Coach |
| | 4 | (Rwanda) | Jean Pierre Bazibanga | | | 11 November 1980 (aged 27) | Cliff Dwuor |
| | 5 | (Rwanda) | Issa Ngoga | | | 12 April 1980 (aged 27) |
| | 6 | (Rwanda) | Aboubakar Barame | | | 26 April 1984 (aged 23) | Assistant coach(es) |
| | 7 | (Rwanda) | Yvan Mico | | | 4 September 1984 (aged 23) |
| | 8 | (Rwanda) | Charles Rukabu | | | 1 January 1985 (aged 22) |
| | 9 | (Rwanda) | Frank Rubanzangabo | | | 1 January 1985 (aged 22) |
| | 10 | (Burundi) | Blaise Nikobahoze | | | 12 April 1988 (aged 19) |
| | 11 | (Rwanda) | Gedega Kajeguhakwa | | | 30 December 1982 (aged 24) |
| | 12 | (Rwanda) | Alain Fundi | | | 19 July 1985 (aged 22) |
| | 13 | (Rwanda) | Jean Umutoni | | | 30 November 1982 (aged 25) |
| | 14 | (Rwanda) | Albert Rukundo | | | 3 May 1985 (aged 22) |
| | 15 | (Rwanda) | Shali Kimanuka | | | 1 January 1971 (aged 36) |

== (Democratic Republic of the Congo) ASB Kauka ==
ASB Kauka – 2007 FIBA Africa Clubs Champions Cup – 8th place roster
| Players | | | | | | | Coaches |
| Pos | # | Nat | Name | Height | Weight | Age | Head Coach |
| | 4 | (Democratic Republic of the Congo) | Pitchou Ndombele | | | 5 May 1977 (aged 30) | Beya Floribary |
| | 5 | (Democratic Republic of the Congo) | Johnny Mualaba | | | 9 July 1988 (aged 19) |
| | 6 | (Democratic Republic of the Congo) | Tumba Buzangu | | | 5 January 1987 (aged 20) | Assistant coach(es) |
| | 7 | (Democratic Republic of the Congo) | Alimasi Mali | | | 3 November 1984 (aged 23) |
| | 8 | (Democratic Republic of the Congo) | Toto Mutombo | | | 19 September 1979 (aged 28) |
| | 9 | (Democratic Republic of the Congo) | Aubin Kasongo | | | 10 October 1986 (aged 21) |
| | 10 | (Democratic Republic of the Congo) | Patrick Mupanda | | | 26 June 1985 (aged 22) |
| | 11 | (Democratic Republic of the Congo) | Robot Mudiandambu | | | 5 February 1990 (aged 17) |
| | 12 | (Democratic Republic of the Congo) | Tshibasu Buzangu | | | 18 May 1982 (aged 25) |
| | 13 | (Democratic Republic of the Congo) | Paul Buzangu | | | 15 August 1981 (aged 26) |
| | 14 | (Democratic Republic of the Congo) | Prince Ngongo | | | 4 December 1981 (aged 26) |
| | 15 | (Democratic Republic of the Congo) | Alain Musamba | | | 3 March 1987 (aged 20) |

== (Benin) ASPAC ==
ASPAC – 2007 FIBA Africa Clubs Champions Cup – 10th place roster
| Players | | | | | | | Coaches |
| Pos | # | Nat | Name | Height | Weight | Age | Head Coach |
| | 4 | (Ivory Coast) | Vignon Sagbohan | | | 28 March 1985 (aged 22) | Basile Klegou |
| | 5 | (Ivory Coast) | Bouko Chabi | | | 27 April 1977 (aged 30) |
| | 6 | (Benin) | Comlan Nato | | | 21 November 1981 (aged 26) | Assistant coach(es) |
| | 7 | (Benin) | Brice Hounnou | | | 1 January 1984 (aged 23) |
| | 8 | (Benin) | Abdel Yarou | | | 7 November 1986 (aged 21) |
| | 9 | (Benin) | Sollagnon Adognon | | | 4 June 1978 (aged 29) |
| | 10 | (Nigeria) | Oludare Borokini | | | 23 July 1985 (aged 22) |
| | 12 | (Benin) | Coevi Quenum | | | 3 January 1985 (aged 22) |
| | 13 | (Benin) | François Honfoga | | | 4 October 1968 (aged 39) |
| | 14 | (Benin) | Hervonce Chadare | | | 18 June 1985 (aged 22) |
| | 15 | (Benin) | Romaric Quenum | | | 8 December 1985 (aged 22) |

== (Mozambique) Ferroviário da Beira ==
Ferroviário da Beira – 2007 FIBA Africa Clubs Champions Cup – 12th place roster
| Players | | | | | | | Coaches |
| Pos | # | Nat | Name | Height | Weight | Age | Head Coach |
| C | 4 | (Mozambique) | Armando Baptista | 2.00 m (6 ft 6 1/2 in) | | 2 June 1985 (aged 22) | (Mozambique) José Delfino |
| | 5 | (Mozambique) | Benjamin Manhanga | | | 2 June 1972 (aged 35) |
| | 6 | (Mozambique) | André Quicimusso | | | 1 October 1982 (aged 25) | Assistant coach(es) |
| | 7 | (Mozambique) | Nílton Manheira | | | 10 September 1978 (aged 29) |
| | 8 | (Mozambique) | Célio Zucule | | | 25 May 1981 (aged 26) |
| | 9 | (Mozambique) | Pionésio Samuel | | | 2 October 1980 (aged 27) |
| | 10 | (Mozambique) | Sérgio Chicava | | | 21 October 1984 (aged 29) |
| | 11 | (Mozambique) | Assumane Tembo | | | 21 June 1984 (aged 23) |
| | 12 | (Mozambique) | Hélder Cumbane | | | 30 July 1986 (aged 21) |
| | 13 | (Mozambique) | Margarido Manhanga | | | 7 April 1981 (aged 26) |
| | 14 | (Mozambique) | Euardo Lon | | | 15 May 1981 (aged 26) |
| | 15 | (Mozambique) | José Zunguza | | | 18 June 1983 (aged 24) |

== (Angola) Interclube ==
G.D. Interclube – 2005 FIBA Africa Clubs Champions Cup – 4th place roster
| Players | | | | | | | Coaches |
| Pos | # | Nat | Name | Height | Weight | Age | Head Coach |
| F | 4 | (Angola) | Hélder Domingos | 1.94 m (6 ft 4 1/2 in) | | 31 October 1978 (aged 29) | (Angola) Manuel Sousa |
| F | 5 | (Angola) | Simão Santos | 1.98 m (6 ft 6 in) | 91 kg (201 lb) | 21 July 1982 (aged 25) |
| G | 6 | (Angola) | Simão Panzo | 1.88 m (6 ft 2 in) | | 29 January 1977 (aged 30) | Assistant coach(es) |
| | 7 | (Angola) | Euclides Camacho | | | 19 September 1980 (aged 27) |
| F | 8 | (Angola) | José Nascimento | 1.96 m (6 ft 5 in) | | 25 December 1978 (aged 28) |
| F | 9 | (Angola) | Michel dos Santos | 1.97 m (6 ft 5 1/2 in) | | 15 April 1986 (aged 21) |
| PF | 10 | (Angola) | Jorge Tati | 1.95 m (6 ft 5 in) | 91 kg (201 lb) | 17 June 1983 (aged 24) |
| C | 11 | (Angola) | Nivaldo Sumbo | 2.01 m (6 ft 7 in) | | 17 May 1981 (aged 26) |
| F | 12 | (Angola) | Vicente Neto | 1.96 m (6 ft 5 in) | | 8 August 1976 (aged 31) |
| G | 13 | (Angola) | Adilson Câmara | 1.82 m (5 ft 11 1/2 in) | | 17 May 1982 (aged 25) |
| C | 14 | (Democratic Republic of the Congo) | Lifetu Selengue | 2.02 m (6 ft 7 1/2 in) | 90 kg (200 lb) | 27 December 1975 (aged 31) |
| SG | 15 | (Central African Republic) (France) | Fabrice Mokoteemapa | 1.92 m (6 ft 3 1/2 in) | | 9 April 1981 (aged 26) |

== (Guinea) Magic Basketball Club ==
MBC – 2007 FIBA Africa Clubs Champions Cup – 9th place roster
| Players | | | | | | | Coaches |
| Pos | # | Nat | Name | Height | Weight | Age | Head Coach |
| | 4 | (Guinea) | Mamadou Camara | | | 19 August 1988 (aged 19) | Keita Lancinet |
| | 5 | (Guinea) | Amadou Camara | | | 24 December 1989 (aged 17) |
| | 6 | (Guinea) | Ben Kone | | | 11 April 1984 (aged 23) | Assistant coach(es) |
| | 7 | (Guinea) | Sékou Condé | | | 31 December 1986 (aged 20) |
| | 8 | (Guinea) | Daouda Gueye | | | 10 October 1976 (aged 31) |
| | 9 | (Guinea) | Mohamed Kéïta | | | 13 November 1986 (aged 21) |
| | 10 | (Guinea) | Djoubaro Camara | | | 22 December 1984 (aged 23) |
| | 11 | (Guinea) | Mamady Soumaoro | | | 7 October 1983 (aged 24) |
| | 12 | (Guinea) | Cheick Condé | | | 20 June 1992 (aged 15) |
| | 13 | (Senegal) | Birame Diack | | | 24 August 1973 (aged 34) |
| | 14 | (Guinea) | Moustapha Condé | | | 1 November 1987 (aged 20) |
| | 15 | (Guinea) | Ousmane Sanoh | | | 14 August 1988 (aged 19) |

== (Nigeria) Niger Potters ==
Niger Potters – 2007 FIBA Africa Clubs Champions Cup – 5th place roster
| Players | | | | | | | Coaches |
| Pos | # | Nat | Name | Height | Weight | Age | Head Coach |
| | 4 | (Nigeria) | Ifeanyi Okoro | | | 31 December 1984 (aged 22) | Adamu Abdu Kuta |
| | 5 | (Nigeria) | Othiniel Anzolo | | | 25 April 1983 (aged 24) |
| | 6 | (Nigeria) | Paul Sati | | | 10 July 1988 (aged 19) | Assistant coach(es) |
| F | 7 | (Nigeria) | Abubakar Usman | 1.94 m (6 ft 4 1/2 in) | | 5 July 1986 (aged 21) |
| | 8 | (Nigeria) | Abubakar Yusuf | | | 28 August 1988 (aged 19) |
| | 9 | (Nigeria) | Faruk Oyalade | | | 31 December 1989 (aged 17) |
| | 11 | (Nigeria) | Chiedozie Nwoye | | | 21 May 1982 (aged 25) |
| | 13 | (Nigeria) | Abdulazeez Yusuf | | | 29 July 1986 (aged 21) |
| F | 14 | (Nigeria) | Stanley Gumut | 2.00 m (6 ft 6 1/2 in) | 95 kg (209 lb) | 21 February 1986 (aged 21) |
| | 15 | (Nigeria) | Dreams Emmanuel | | | 11 July 1982 (aged 25) |

== (Democratic Republic of the Congo) B.C. Onatra ==
BC Onatra – 2007 FIBA Africa Clubs Champions Cup – 7th place roster
| Players | | | | | | | Coaches |
| Pos | # | Nat | Name | Height | Weight | Age | Head Coach |
| | 4 | (Democratic Republic of the Congo) | Bienvenu Ngandu | | | 28 August 1985 (aged 22) | Mozingo Mozim |
| | 5 | (Democratic Republic of the Congo) | Rossy Badio | | | 3 December 1986 (aged 21) |
| | 6 | (Democratic Republic of the Congo) | Fabrice Dialunda | | | 15 July 1985 (aged 22) | Assistant coach(es) |
| | 7 | (Democratic Republic of the Congo) | Kabangu-Tshimbanga | | | 18 September 1983 (aged 24) |
| | 8 | (Democratic Republic of the Congo) | Kanyinda Tshiabola | | | 6 September 1985 (aged 22) |
| | 9 | (Democratic Republic of the Congo) | Presta Nzuzi | | | 2 October 1980 (aged 27) |
| | 10 | (Democratic Republic of the Congo) | Docta Lukusa | | | 2 July 1981 (aged 26) |
| | 11 | (Democratic Republic of the Congo) | Amisi Saidi | | | 10 October 1987 (aged 20) |
| | 12 | (Democratic Republic of the Congo) | Rodrigue Mawelo | | | 20 August 1988 (aged 19) |
| | 13 | (Democratic Republic of the Congo) | Mabilama Samuna | | | 12 June 1978 (aged 29) |
| | 14 | (Democratic Republic of the Congo) | Isasi Ndelo | | | 18 November 1986 (aged 21) |
| | 15 | (Democratic Republic of the Congo) | Mulamba-Mulamba | | | 6 June 1988 (aged 19) |

== (Angola) Petro Atlético ==
Petro Atlético – 2007 FIBA Africa Clubs Champions Cup – Silver medal roster
| Players | | | | | | | Coaches |
| Pos | # | Nat | Name | Height | Weight | Age | Head Coach |
| PF | 4 | (Angola) | Eduardo Mingas | 1.98 m (6 ft 6 in) | 106 kg (234 lb) | 29 January 1979 (aged 28) | (Angola) Alberto de Carvalho |
| F | 5 | (Angola) | Luís Costa | 1.94 m (6 ft 4 1/2 in) | 93 kg (205 lb) | 7 June 1978 (aged 29) |
| SG | 6 | (Angola) | Carlos Morais | 1.93 m (6 ft 4 in) | 91 kg (201 lb) | 16 October 1985 (aged 22) | Assistant coach(es) |
| | 7 | (Angola) | Fernando Albano | | | 11 September 1975 (aged 32) |
| PF | 8 | (Angola) | Leonel Paulo | 1.97 m (6 ft 5 1/2 in) | 114 kg (251 lb) | 30 April 1986 (aged 21) |
| SF | 9 | (Angola) | Joaquim Xavier | 1.94 m (6 ft 4 1/2 in) | | 22 January 1981 (aged 26) |
| G | 10 | (United States) | Shannon Crooks | | | 11 December 1978 (aged 29) |
| C | 11 | (Angola) | Victor Muzadi | 2.01 m (6 ft 7 in) | 102 kg (225 lb) | 22 June 1978 (aged 28) |
| SG | 12 | (Angola) | Francisco Horácio | 1.92 m (6 ft 3 1/2 in) | 81 kg (179 lb) | 28 October 1984 (aged 23) |
| PG | 13 | (Angola) | Mílton Barros | 1.83 m (6 ft 0 in) | 75 kg (165 lb) | 21 June 1984 (aged 23) |
| G | 14 | (Angola) | Domingos Bonifácio | 1.84 m (6 ft 1/2 in) | 76 kg (168 lb) | 28 October 1984 (aged 23) |
| F | 15 | (Angola) | Víctor de Carvalho | 1.93 m (6 ft 4 in) | 89 kg (196 lb) | 20 February 1969 (aged 38) |

== (Angola) Primeiro de Agosto ==
Primeiro de Agosto – 2007 FIBA Africa Clubs Champions Cup – Gold medal roster
| Players | | | | | | | Coaches |
| Pos | # | Nat | Name | Height | Weight | Age | Head Coach |
| G | 4 | (Angola) | Mayzer Alexandre | 1.84 m (6 ft 1/2 in) | | 29 June 1984 (aged 23) | (Angola) Jaime Covilhã |
| PG | 5 | (Angola) | Armando Costa | 1.92 m (6 ft 3 1/2 in) | 91 kg (201 lb) | 3 June 1983 (aged 24) |
| G | 6 | (Cape Verde) (United States) | Marques Houtman | 1.90 m (6 ft 3 in) | | 18 August 1979 (aged 28) |
| F | 7 | (Angola) | Olímpio Cipriano | 1.94 m (6 ft 4 1/2 in) | 93 kg (205 lb) | 9 April 1982 (aged 25) |
| C | 8 | (Angola) | Joaquim Gomes | 2.00 m (6 ft 6 1/2 in) | 100 kg (220 lb) | 23 December 1980 (aged 26) |
| C | 9 | (Angola) | Felizardo Ambrósio | 2.02 m (6 ft 7 1/2 in) | 97 kg (214 lb) | 25 December 1987 (aged 19) |
| PF | 10 | (Angola) | Vladimir Ricardino | 2.03 m (6 ft 8 in) | 93 kg (205 lb) | 4 October 1978 (aged 29) |
| C | 11 | (Portugal) | Francisco Jordão | 2.00 m (6 ft 6 1/2 in) | | 22 June 1978 (aged 29) |
| C | 12 | (Angola) (Chad) | Abdel Bouckar | 2.02 m (6 ft 7 1/2 in) | 109 kg (240 lb) | 8 April 1980 (aged 27) |
| SF | 13 | (Angola) | Carlos Almeida | 1.93 m (6 ft 4 in) | 91 kg (201 lb) | 24 September 1976 (aged 31) |
| PG | 14 | (Angola) | Miguel Lutonda | 1.86 m (6 ft 1 in) | 78 kg (172 lb) | 24 December 1971 (aged 35) |
| PF | 15 | (Cape Verde) (Netherlands) | Rodrigo Mascarenhas | 1.96 m (6 ft 5 in) | | 24 March 1980 (aged 27) |

== (Mali) Stade Malien ==
Stade Malien – 2007 FIBA Africa Clubs Champions Cup – 11th place roster
| Players | | | | | | | Coaches |
| Pos | # | Nat | Name | Height | Weight | Age | Head Coach |
| | 4 | (Mali) | Amadou Kaba | | | 10 November 1990 (aged 17) | Sekou Tamboura |
| | 5 | (Mali) | Younoussa Maiga | | | 19 March 1987 (aged 20) |
| | 6 | (Mali) | Mahamadou Tangara | | | 18 March 1976 (aged 31) | Assistant coach(es) |
| | 7 | (Mali) | Hamidou Simpara | | | 29 March 1986 (aged 21) |
| | 8 | (Mali) | Yacouba Traore | | | 22 March 1989 (aged 18) |
| | 9 | (Mali) | Adedayo Ogunsola | | | 24 September 1985 (aged 22) |
| | 10 | (Mali) | Moussa Kone | | | 14 July 1984 (aged 23) |
| | 11 | (Mali) | Ba Diallo | | | 29 August 1986 (aged 21) |
| | 12 | (Mali) | Mory Diane | | | 21 July 1985 (aged 22) |
| | 13 | (Mali) | Moussa Diallo | | | 21 October 1980 (aged 27) |
| | 14 | (Mali) | Sorry Niambele | | | 22 August 1990 (aged 17) |
| | 15 | (Mali) | Ibrahima Dembele | | | 25 March 1988 (aged 19) |
