= AfroBasket 2007 =

Tournament details
- Host country: Angola
- Dates: 15–25 August
- Teams: 16
- Venues: 5 (in 5 host cities)

Final positions
- Champions: Angola (9th title)
- Runners-up: Cameroon
- Third place: Cape Verde
- Fourth place: Egypt

Tournament statistics
- MVP: (Angola) Joaquim Gomes
- Top scorer: (Mali) Modibo Niakaté (21.8 points per game)

AfroBasket 2007 was the 24th FIBA Africa Championship, played under the auspices of the Fédération Internationale de Basketball, the basketball sport governing body of the African zone. The tournament was hosted by Angola, in the cities of Benguela, Cabinda, Huambo and Lubango.

Angola won its fifth consecutive African championship and ninth overall by beating Cameroon 86–72 in the championship game. Cape Verde won the bronze medal game over Egypt. Angola qualified for the 2008 Summer Olympics in Beijing, whereas Cameroon and Cape Verde qualified for the 2008 Olympic qualifying tournament. Angola's Joaquim Gomes was awarded as the tournament's Most Valuable Player.

== Venues ==
City	Arena	Capacity
Luanda	Pavilhão da Cidadela	6,873
Benguela	Pavilhão Acácias Rubras	2,100
Huambo	Pavilhão Serra Van-Dúnem	2,010
Lubango	Pavilhão Nossa Senhora do Monte	2,000
Cabinda	Pavilhão do Tafe	2,000

== Preliminary round ==
Qualified for the quarterfinals
Relegated to classification matches

All times are in local time UTC+1

=== Group A ===
Team	Pld	W	L	PF	PA	PD	Pts
Angola	3	3	0	317	168	+149	6
Cape Verde	3	2	1	200	242	-42	5
Morocco	3	1	2	212	261	-49	4
Rwanda	3	0	3	196	254	-85	3

15 August 2007

Boxscore

Rwanda	66–109	Angola
Scoring by quarter: 17-32, 19-24, 22-27, 8-26
Pts: Ruhezamihigo 17; Rebs: Thomson 6 Asts: three players 2		Pts: Olímpio 17; Rebs: Muzadi 5 Asts: Lutonda 5

Pavilhão da Cidadela, Luanda

17 August 2007

Boxscore

Morocco	80–85 (OT)	Cape Verde
Scoring by quarter: 12-15, 30-21, 12-18, 16-16, Overtime: 10-15
Pts: El Masbahi 18; Rebs: Rhalimi 9 Asts: Khalfi 6		Pts: Mascarenhas, Correia 15; Rebs: Mascarenhas 9 Asts: three players 3

Pavilhão Acácias Rubras, Benguela

18 August 2007

Boxscore

Angola	100–44	Cape Verde
Scoring by quarter: 25-7, 34-13, 19-13, 22-11
Pts: Miller 13; Rebs: Miller 6 Asts: Lutonda, Olímpio 4		Pts: Correia 11; Rebs: Correia, Monteiro 5 Asts: Fortes 2

Pavilhão Acácias Rubras, Benguela

18 August 2007

Boxscore

Rwanda	68–74	Morocco
Scoring by quarter: 23-19, 14-12, 8-21, 23-22
Pts: Auriantal 28; Rebs: Auriantal 13; Asts: Miller 6		Pts: Khalfi 24; Rebs: Rhalimi 7 Asts: Khalfi, Ruhezamihigo 4

Pavilhão Acácias Rubras, Benguela

19 August 2007

Boxscore

Angola	108–58	Morocco
Scoring by quarter: 25-9, 24-12, 29-18, 30-19
Pts: Olímpio 16; Rebs: Muzadi 6 Asts: Morais 4		Pts: Bouhelal 11; Rebs: three players 3 Asts: Bouhelal, Khalfi 2

Pavilhão Acácias Rubras, Benguela

19 August 2007

Boxscore

Cape Verde	71–62	Rwanda
Scoring by quarter: 16-22, 18-10, 24-15, 13-15
Pts: Mascarenhas 17; Rebs: Mascarenhas 10; Asts: Mascarenhas, Correia 5		Pts: Auriantal 18; Rebs: Auriantal 10; Asts: Auriantal, Ruhezamihigo 2

Pavilhão Acácias Rubras, Benguela

=== Group B ===
Qualified for the quarterfinals
Relegated to classification matches

Team	Pld	W	L	PF	PA	PD	Pts
Egypt	3	2	1	205	201	+4	5
Ivory Coast	3	2	1	195	199	+4	5
Senegal	3	1	2	211	201	+10	4
Mali	3	1	2	206	216	-10	4

17 August 2007

Boxscore

Mali	70–85	Senegal
Scoring by quarter: 19-21, 14-25, 23-17, 14-22
Pts: Diakité 15; Rebs: M.Diarra 9 Asts: M.Diarra, Niakate 2		Pts: Ndoye 25; Rebs: Badiane 11; Asts: Ndoye 5

Pavilhão N.Sra Monte, Lubango

17 August 2007

Boxscore

Egypt	73–65	Ivory Coast
Scoring by quarter: 22-15, 14-19, 16-18, 21-13
Pts: El-Ghannam 23; Rebs: El-Ghannam 13; Asts: El-Gammal 5		Pts: S.Konaté 11; Rebs: Tape 9 Asts: Touali, Diabate 3

Pavilhão N.Sra Monte, Lubango

18 August 2007

Boxscore

Senegal	63–65	Ivory Coast
Scoring by quarter: 16-15, 14-20, 15-18, 18-12
Pts: Badiane 15; Rebs: Badiane, Sow 6 Asts: Seck 3		Pts: Touali 20; Rebs: Afeli, Djahue 6 Asts: Dioum 2

Pavilhão N.Sra Monte, Lubango

18 August 2007

Boxscore

Mali	73–66	Egypt
Scoring by quarter: 18-13, 19-14, 22-24, 14-15
Pts: Niakate 23; Rebs: Samake 10; Asts: S.Diakite 4		Pts: Gunady 14; Rebs: El-Ghannam 15; Asts: Khedr 4

Pavilhão N.Sra Monte, Lubango

19 August 2007

Boxscore

Senegal	63–66	Egypt
Scoring by quarter: 14-17, 13-18, 13-18, 23-13
Pts: Ndoye 20; Rebs: Badiane 11; Asts: Ndoye, Pene 2		Pts: El-Ghannam 15; Rebs: El-Ghannam 10; Asts: Khedr 4

Pavilhão N.Sra Monte, Lubango

19 August 2007

Boxscore

Ivory Coast	65–63	Mali
Scoring by quarter: 8-23, 14-10, 18-13, 25-17
Pts: Touali 21; Rebs: Touali, Diabate 5 Asts: Koffi 2		Pts: Niakate 26; Rebs: Samake 6 Asts: Diallo 4

Pavilhão N.Sra Monte, Lubango

=== Group C ===
Qualified for the quarterfinals
Relegated to classification matches

Team	Pld	W	L	PF	PA	PD	Pts
Nigeria	3	3	0	276	163	+113	6
Central African Republic	3	2	1	216	194	+22	5
DR Congo	3	1	2	212	225	-13	4
Liberia	3	0	3	163	285	-122	3

17 August 2007

Boxscore

Liberia	35–109	Nigeria
Scoring by quarter: 12-24, 2-25, 14-41, 7-19
Pts: Kuiah 12; Rebs: Tapeh 4 Asts: Bing 1		Pts: Odia 22; Rebs: Ugboaja 11; Asts: Odia 6

Pavilhão O.S. Van-Dúnem, Huambo

17 August 2007

Boxscore

DR Congo	58–66	Central African Rep.
Scoring by quarter: 23-13, 16-17, 10-13, 9-23
Pts: Mali 15; Rebs: Selengue 10; Asts: Samuna 5		Pts: Bomayako 13; Rebs: Vivies 14; Asts: Mokoteemapa 4

Pavilhão O.S. Van-Dúnem, Huambo

18 August 2007

Boxscore

Nigeria	77–54	Central African Rep.
Scoring by quarter: 22-17, 20-6, 15-14, 20-17
Pts: Anagonye 20; Rebs: Anagonye 10; Asts: Awojobi, Odia 4		Pts: Koundjia 14; Rebs: Siris 5 Asts: four players 2

Pavilhão O.S. Van-Dúnem, Huambo

18 August 2007

Boxscore

Liberia	69–80	DR Congo
Scoring by quarter: 19-28, 10-10, 17-19, 23-23
Pts: Smith 31; Rebs: Wolo 9 Asts: Quaye 4		Pts: Selengue 20; Rebs: Yele 8 Asts: Kizubanata 5

Pavilhão O.S. Van-Dúnem, Huambo

19 August 2007

Boxscore

Nigeria	90–74	DR Congo
Scoring by quarter: 16-20, 24-16, 22-17, 28-21
Pts: Anagonye 22; Rebs: Oyedeji 8 Asts: Odia 6		Pts: Selengue 23; Rebs: Samuna 9 Asts: Samuna 7

Pavilhão O.S. Van-Dúnem, Huambo

19 August 2007

Boxscore

Central African Rep.	96–59	Liberia
Scoring by quarter: 17-8, 29-17, 27-18, 23-16
Pts: Sitchi 20; Rebs: Vivies 10; Asts: Mombollet 4		Pts: Smith, Quaye 11; Rebs: Wolo 5 Asts: Smith, Quaye 2

Pavilhão O.S. Van-Dúnem, Huambo

=== Group D ===
Qualified for the quarterfinals
Relegated to classification matches

Team	Pld	W	L	PF	PA	PD	Pts
Cameroon	3	3	0	230	183	+47	5
Tunisia	3	2	1	215	202	+13	5
Mozambique	3	1	2	174	197	-23	4
South Africa	3	0	3	183	220	-37	4

17 August 2007

Boxscore

Cameroon	66–54	Mozambique
Scoring by quarter: 20-10, 17-15, 18-13, 11-16
Pts: Nanfah 16; Rebs: Owona 11; Asts: Ebongue, Ekanga 3		Pts: Magoliço 15; Rebs: Muchate 9 Asts: Alípio 4

Pavilhão do Tafe, Cabinda

17 August 2007

Boxscore

South Africa	66–72	Tunisia
Scoring by quarter: 19-21, 15-19, 11-18, 21-14
Pts: Mothiba 22; Rebs: Mothiba 8 Asts: Engelbrecht 5		Pts: Maoua 16; Rebs: Rzig 8 Asts: El Amri 4

Pavilhão do Tafe, Cabinda

18 August 2007

Boxscore

Mozambique	61–73	Tunisia
Scoring by quarter: 14-19, 13-19, 11-17, 23-18
Pts: Mandlate 15; Rebs: Muchate 14; Asts: Mandlate 4		Pts: Maoua 21; Rebs: Maoua, Maalaoui 7 Asts: Mouhli 3

Pavilhão do Tafe, Cabinda

18 August 2007

Boxscore

Cameroon	89–59	South Africa
Scoring by quarter: 26-15, 18-19, 28-18, 17-7
Pts: Ekanga 17; Rebs: Bayang, Nanfah 4 Asts: Bitee 5		Pts: Mothiba 15; Rebs: Kgwedi 3 Asts: three players 2

Pavilhão do Tafe, Cabinda

19 August 2007

Boxscore

Mozambique	59–58	South Africa
Scoring by quarter: 9-19, 16-12, 14-17, 20-10
Pts: Magoliço 21; Rebs: Magoliço, Mandlate 7 Asts: four players 2		Pts: Nthuping 12; Rebs: Molebatsi 11; Asts: Engelbrecht 6

Pavilhão do Tafe, Cabinda

19 August 2007

Boxscore

Tunisia	70–75	Cameroon
Scoring by quarter: 18-17, 17-20, 21-21, 14-17
Pts: Dhouibi 16; Rebs: three players 3 Asts: El Amri, Maoua 4		Pts: Mbah 17; Rebs: Nanfah 12; Asts: Mbah 3

Pavilhão do Tafe, Cabinda

== Classification round ==
9th-16th place
21 August 2007 – 11:00
Morocco	93
Liberia	54
21 August 2007 – 13:30
South Africa	76
Senegal	99
21 August 2007 – 16:00
Mali	67
Mozambique	61
21 August 2007 – 18:30
DR Congo	87
Rwanda	89

9th-12th Place
22 August 2007 – 16:00
Morocco	86
Mali	76
21 August 2007 – 11:00
Senegal	93
Rwanda	58

9th place
23 August 2007 – 18:30
Morocco	68
Senegal	79
11th place
23 August 2007 – 16:00
Mali	78
Rwanda	74

13th-16th place
22 August 2007 – 11:00
Liberia	65
Mozambique	81
22 August 2007 – 13:30
South Africa	77
DR Congo	74

13th place
23 August 2007 – 11:00
Mozambique	85
South Africa	97
15th place
23 August 2007 – 11:00
Liberia	84
DR Congo	92

=== 9th-16th classification ===
21 August 2007
11:00

Boxscore

Morocco	93–54	Liberia
Scoring by quarter: 20-9, 19-18, 25-16, 29-11
Pts: Bassim 24; Rebs: Bouhelal 7 Asts: Mouak 4		Pts: Smith 25; Rebs: Bing 5 Asts: Quaye 4

Pavilhão Acácias Rubras, Benguela

21 August 2007
13:30

Boxscore

South Africa	76–99	Senegal
Scoring by quarter: 28-27, 14-24, 17-19, 17-29
Pts: Mothiba 19; Rebs: Molebatsi 6 Asts: Engelbrecht 6		Pts: Faye 22; Rebs: Badiane 8 Asts: Sow 6

Pavilhão Acácias Rubras, Benguela

21 August 2007
16:00

Boxscore

Mali	67–61	Mozambique
Scoring by quarter: 14-18, 10-20, 22-12, 21-11
Pts: Niakate 23; Rebs: Diawara 13; Asts: Niakate, N.Diakité 4		Pts: Magoliço 17; Rebs: Magoliço 8 Asts: Alípio 3

Pavilhão Acácias Rubras, Benguela

21 August 2007
18:30

Boxscore

DR Congo	87–89	Rwanda
Scoring by quarter: 12-14, 19-22, 19-27, 27-14
Pts: Kizubanata 22; Rebs: Kizubanata 9 Asts: Lukusa 4		Pts: Auriantal 28; Rebs: Auriantal 12; Asts: Ruhezamihigo 7

Pavilhão Acácias Rubras, Benguela

=== 13th-16th classification ===
22 August 2007
11:00

Boxscore

Liberia	65–81	Mozambique
Scoring by quarter: 15-20, 13-16, 18-17, 19-28
Pts: Smith 20; Rebs: Tapeh, Allison 6 Asts: Quaye 5		Pts: Mandlate 20; Rebs: Magoliço 9 Asts: Mandlate, Alípio 4

Pavilhão Acácias Rubras, Benguela

22 August 2007
13:30

Boxscore

South Africa	77–74	DR Congo
Scoring by quarter: 12-13, 23-22, 24-17, 18-22
Pts: Molebatsi 19; Rebs: Mothiba 9 Asts: Mazibuko 4		Pts: Selengue 24; Rebs: Ndelo 8 Asts: three players 3

Pavilhão Acácias Rubras, Benguela

=== 9th-12th classification ===
22 August 2007
16:00

Boxscore

Morocco	86–76	Mali
Scoring by quarter: 16-23, 20-23, 25-15, 25-15
Pts: Bouhelal 22; Rebs: Bouhelal 8 Asts: Khalfi 5		Pts: Niakate 25; Rebs: N.Diakité 13; Asts: Niangado 3

Pavilhão Acácias Rubras, Benguela

22 August 2007
18:30

Boxscore

Senegal	93–58	Rwanda
Scoring by quarter: 23-6, 19-15, 22-16, 29-21
Pts: Faye 19; Rebs: Faye 7 Asts: Pene 5		Pts: Thomson 24; Rebs: Thomson 10; Asts: Thomson 3

Pavilhão Acácias Rubras, Benguela

=== 15th place ===
23 August 2007
11:00

Boxscore

Liberia	84–92	DR Congo
Scoring by quarter: 19-25, 25-29, 20-19, 20-20
Pts: Smith 17; Rebs: Wolo 8 Asts: Quaye 6		Pts: Kizubanata 27; Rebs: Selengue 8 Asts: Lukusa 5

Pavilhão Acácias Rubras, Benguela

=== 13th place ===
23 August 2007
13:30

Boxscore

Mozambique	85–97	South Africa
Scoring by quarter: 20-18, 17-30, 23-16, 25-33
Pts: Magoliço 37; Rebs: Magoliço 5 Asts: Mandlate 5		Pts: Mothiba 27; Rebs: Denyssen 8 Asts: Denyssen, Molebatsi 5

Pavilhão Acácias Rubras, Benguela

=== 11th place ===
23 August 2007
16:00

Boxscore

Mali	78–74	Rwanda
Scoring by quarter: 20-13, 18-17, 21-25, 19-19
Pts: Niakate 22; Rebs: Diawara 11; Asts: Niakate 4		Pts: Thomson 21; Rebs: Auriantal 12; Asts: Ruhezamihigo 5

Pavilhão Acácias Rubras, Benguela

=== 9th place ===
23 August 2007
18:30

Boxscore

Morocco	68–79	Senegal
Scoring by quarter: 16-16, 14-22, 17-20, 21-21
Pts: Rhalimi 18; Rebs: Rhalimi 10; Asts: Khalfi 4		Pts: Faye 20; Rebs: Sow 9 Asts: Pene 6

Pavilhão Acácias Rubras, Benguela

== Knockout round ==
Quarter-finals
21 August 2007 – 13:00
Egypt	67
Tunisia	57
21 August 2007 – 18:00
Cameroon	76
Ivory Coast	56
21 August 2007 – 15:30
Nigeria	53
Cape Verde	62
21 August 2007 – 20:30
Angola	78
Central African Rep.	51

Semi-finals
23 August 2007 – 16:30
Egypt	52
Cameroon	58
23 August 2007 – 19:00
Angola	93
Cape Verde	60

Final
25 August 2007 – 19:00
Angola	86
Cameroon	72
Third place
24 August 2007 – 19:00
Cape Verde	53
Egypt	51

5th-8th place
22 August 2007 – 16:30
Central African Rep.	46
Nigeria	80
22 August 2007 – 19:00
Tunisia	74
Ivory Coast	63

5th place
24 August 2007 – 16:30
Nigeria	83
Tunisia	82
7th place
23 August 2007 – 14:00
Central African Rep.	69
Ivory Coast	63

=== Quarterfinals ===
21 August 2007
13:00

Boxscore

Egypt	67–57	Tunisia
Scoring by quarter: 20-13, 13-14, 12-12, 22-18
Pts: El-Gammal 13; Rebs: El-Ghannam 14; Asts: Khedr 4		Pts: Slimane 16; Rebs: Rzig 6 Asts: Dhouibi 3

Pavilhão da Cidadela, Luanda

21 August 2007
15:30

Boxscore

Nigeria	53–62	Cape Verde
Scoring by quarter: 8-6, 15-17, 9-22, 21-17
Pts: Oyedeji 14; Rebs: Odia 6 Asts: Badmus 5		Pts: Houtman 19; Rebs: three players 9 Asts: Houtman 3

Pavilhão da Cidadela, Luanda

21 August 2007
18:00

Boxscore

Cameroon	76–56	Ivory Coast
Scoring by quarter: 20-9, 13-18, 22-14, 21-15
Pts: Bouli 17; Rebs: Owona 9 Asts: Mbah 7		Pts: N'Diaye 15; Rebs: Afeli 6 Asts: Touali 3

Pavilhão da Cidadela, Luanda

21 August 2007
20:30

Boxscore

Angola	78–51	Central African Rep.
Scoring by quarter: n/a, n/a, 15-10, 27-12
Pts: Olímpio 23; Rebs: Kikas 7 Asts: Morais, Mingas 3		Pts: Mokoteemapa 16; Rebs: three players 3 Asts: three players 1

Pavilhão da Cidadela, Luanda

=== 5th-8th classification ===
22 August 2007
16:30

Boxscore

Central African Rep.	46–80	Nigeria
Scoring by quarter: 9-24, 16-20, 8-12, 13-24
Pts: Mokoteemapa 12; Rebs: Mombollet, Madozein 3 Asts: Mokoteemapa 3		Pts: Awojobi 18; Rebs: Ugboaja 7 Asts: Odia 6

Pavilhão da Cidadela, Luanda

22 August 2007
19:00

Boxscore

Tunisia	74–63	Ivory Coast
Scoring by quarter: 21-19, 21-23, 18-11, 14-10
Pts: Rzig 27; Rebs: Slimane 9 Asts: Rzig 4		Pts: Touali 15; Rebs: Touali 5 Asts: four players 2

Pavilhão da Cidadela, Luanda

=== Semifinals ===
23 August 2007
16:30

Boxscore

Egypt	52–58	Cameroon
Scoring by quarter: 15-9, 11-24, 14-8, 12-17
Pts: Hussein 15; Rebs: El-Ghannam 7 Asts: Gunady 4		Pts: Mbah 20; Rebs: Mbah 9 Asts: Bouli 4

Pavilhão da Cidadela, Luanda

23 August 2007
19:00

Boxscore

Angola	93–60	Cape Verde
Scoring by quarter: 20-16, 19-16, 25-15, 29-13
Pts: Mílton 18; Rebs: Mingas 7 Asts: five players 2		Pts: Mascarenhas 16; Rebs: Mascarenhas 8 Asts: Correia, Neves 3

Pavilhão da Cidadela, Luanda

=== 7th place ===
23 August 2007
14:00

Boxscore

Central African Rep.	69–63	Ivory Coast
Scoring by quarter: 10-17, 26-11, 19-16, 14-19
Pts: Bomayako 20; Rebs: Mombollet 7 Asts: four players 2		Pts: S.Konaté 17; Rebs: S.Konaté 10; Asts: Koffi, Touali 1

Pavilhão da Cidadela, Luanda

=== 5th place ===
24 August 2007
16:30

Boxscore

Nigeria	83–82	Tunisia
Scoring by quarter: 11-23, 25-15, 15-18, 18-13
Pts: Oguchi 21; Rebs: Anagonye 9 Asts: Obazuaye 6		Pts: Rzig 13; Rebs: Maalaoui 5 Asts: Maalaoui, Slimane 3

Pavilhão da Cidadela, Luanda

=== Bronze-medal match ===
24 August 2007
19:00

Boxscore

Cape Verde	53–51	Egypt
Scoring by quarter: 13-17, 13-15, 13-13, 14-6
Pts: Mascarenhas 15; Rebs: Mascarenhas 12; Asts: five players 2		Pts: Rabie 12; Rebs: Rabie 6 Asts: six players 1

Pavilhão da Cidadela, Luanda

=== Final ===
25 August 2007
19:00

Boxscore

Angola	86–72	Cameroon
Scoring by quarter: 10-10, 23-21, 34-20, 19-21
Pts: Mingas 18; Rebs: Kikas 5 Asts: Mingas 6		Pts: Nanfah 18; Rebs: Nanfah 10; Asts: Mbah 3

Pavilhão da Cidadela, Luanda

== Final standings ==
Qualified for the 2008 Summer Olympics
Qualified for the 2008 Olympic qualifying tournament

Rank	Team	Record
Gold medal	Angola	6–0
Silver medal	Cameroon	5–1
Bronze medal	Cape Verde	4–2
4	Egypt	3-3
5	Nigeria	5-1
6	Tunisia	3-3
7	Central African Rep.	3-3
8	Ivory Coast	2–4
9	Senegal	4-2
10	Morocco	3-3
11	Mali	3-3
12	Rwanda	1–5
13	South Africa	2-4
14	Mozambique	2-4
15	DR Congo	2-4
16	Liberia	0-6

1st	2nd	3rd
Angola Armando Costa; Carlos Almeida; Carlos Morais; Eduardo Mingas; Felizardo Ambrósio; Joaquim Gomes; Luis Costa; Miguel Lutonda; Mílton Barros; Olímpio Cipriano; Victor de Carvalho; Victor Muzadi; Coach: Alberto de Carvalho	Cameroon Alexandre N'Kembe; Brice Nanfah; Christian Bayang; Franck Ndongo; Gaston Essengué; Jean Pierre Ebongue; Joachim Ekanga; Joseph Owona; Luc Mbah; Parfait Bitee; Patrick Bouli; Romeo Tatchoum; Coach: Lazare Adingono	Cape Verde Agildo Cabral; António Moreira; Aquiles Semedo; Felix Monteiro; Mário Correia; Mário Neves; Marques Houtman; Odair Sanches; Rodrigo Mascarenhas; Tony Barros; Vitor Fortes; Waldir Soares; Coach: Emanuel Trovoada

== Awards ==
2007 FIBA Africa Championship winners

Angola
Ninth title

Most Valuable Player
(Angola) Joaquim Gomes "Kikas"

=== All-Tournament Team ===
- (Cape Verde) Marques Houtman
- (Angola) Olímpio Cipriano
- (Cameroon) Luc Mbah a Moute
- (Angola) Joaquim Gomes
- (Cape Verde) Rodrigo Mascarenhas

== Statistical leaders ==
=== Individual Tournament Highs ===
Points

Rank	Name	G	Pts	PPG
1	(Mali) Modibo Niakate	6	131	21.8
2	(Democratic Republic of the Congo) Lifetu Selengue	6	111	18.5
2	(Rwanda) Manix Auriantal	6	111	18.5
4	(Rwanda) Robert Thomson	6	108	18
5	(Mozambique) Octávio Magoliço	6	107	17.8
5	(Liberia) Mark Smith	6	107	17.8
7	(South Africa) Neo Mothiba	6	106	17.7
8	(Senegal) Maleye Ndoye	6	91	15.2
9	(Mali) Nouha Diakité	6	89	14.8
10	(Tunisia) Amine Rzig	6	86	14.3

Rebounds

Rank	Name	G	Rbs	RPG
1	(Egypt) Tarek El-Ghannam	5	59	11.5
2	(Rwanda) Manix Auriantal	6	57	9.5
3	(Cape Verde) Rodrigo Mascarenhas	6	49	8.2
4	(Senegal) Malick Badiane	6	47	7.8
5	(Democratic Republic of the Congo) Lifetu Selengue	6	46	7.7
6	(Nigeria) Olumide Oyedeji	3	22	7.3
7	(Mozambique) Octávio Magoliço	6	42	7
7	(Cameroon) Brice Nanfah	6	42	7
9	(Cameroon) Luc Mbah	5	34	6.8
10	(Central African Republic) Olivier Vivies	6	39	6.5

Assists

Rank	Name	G	Ast	APG
1	(Morocco) Mustapha Khalfi	6	24	4
1	(Nigeria) Churchill Odia	6	24	4
3	(South Africa) Patrick Engelbrecht	6	23	3.8
4	(Liberia) Raphael Quaye	6	21	3.5
5	(Democratic Republic of the Congo) Mabilama Samuna	5	17	3.4
6	(Rwanda) Hamza Ruhezamihigo	6	20	3.3
7	(Cameroon) Luc Mbah	5	16	3.2
8	(Nigeria) Tunji Awojobi	5	15	3
8	(Nigeria) Abe Badmus	5	15	3
10	(Senegal) El Kabir Pene	6	17	2.8

Steals

Rank	Name	G	Stl	SPG
1	(Egypt) Ramy Gunady	6	23	3.8
2	(Angola) olímpio Cipriano	6	20	3.3
3	(Mali) Modibo Niakate	6	18	3
4	(Cameroon) Luc Mbah	5	15	3
5	(Mozambique) Ricardo Alípio	6	17	2.8
6	(Rwanda) Manix Auriantal	6	16	2.7
7	(Democratic Republic of the Congo) Mabilama Samuna	5	13	2.6
8	(Cameroon) Gaston Essengué	6	15	2.5
8	(Cape Verde) Rodrigo Mascarenhas	6	15	2.5
10	(Egypt) Wael Khedr	6	14	2.3

Blocks

Rank	Name	G	Blk	BPG
1	(Nigeria) Jeleel Akindele	6	10	1.7
2	(Cameroon) Gaston Essengué	6	7	1.2
2	(Cameroon) Joseph Owona	6	7	1.2
4	(Democratic Republic of the Congo) Lifetu Selengue	6	6	1
4	(Nigeria) Ejike Ugboaja	6	6	1
6	(Central African Republic) Souleymane Asrangue	6	5	0.8
7	(Cameroon) Luc Mbah	5	4	0.8
8	(Angola) Joaquim Gomes	6	4	0.7
8	(Senegal) Issa Konare	6	4	0.7
8	(Democratic Republic of the Congo) Djo Yele	6	4	0.7

Minutes

Rank	Name	G	Min	MPG
1	(Rwanda) Robert Thomson	6	210	35
2	(Tunisia) Amine Rzig	6	208	34.7
3	(Mali) Modibo Niakate	6	205	34.2
4	(Mozambique) Octávio Magoliço	6	201	33.5
5	(Rwanda) Manix Auriantal	6	195	32.5
6	(Rwanda) Matthew Miller	6	193	32.2
7	(Democratic Republic of the Congo) Lifetu Selengue	6	189	31.5
8	(Cape Verde) Mário Correia	6	188	31.3
9	(Cape Verde) Rodrigo Mascarenhas	6	187	31.2
10	(Nigeria) Churchill Odia	6	184	30.7

=== Individual Game Highs ===
Department	Name	Total	Opponent
Points	(Mozambique) Octávio Magoliço	37	South Africa
Rebounds	(Egypt) Tarek El-Ghannam	15	Mali
Assists	three players	7	
Steals	(Rwanda) Manix Auriantal (Angola) Olímpio Cipriano	7	Morocco
Blocks	(Cameroon) Joseph Owona (Nigeria) Ejike Ugboaja	4	Mozambique; Liberia
2-point field goal percentage	(Democratic Republic of the Congo) Gege Kizubanata	100% (9/9)	Liberia
3-point field goal percentage	(Ivory Coast) Guy Touali	100% (5/5)	Mali
Free throw percentage	three players	100% (9/9)	
Turnovers	(South Africa) Patrick Engelbrecht (Liberia) Mark Smith	10	Cameroon; Morocco

=== Team Tournament Highs ===
Points per Game

Pos.	Name	PPG
1	Angola	95.7
2	Nigeria	82
3	Senegal	80.3
4	DR Congo	77.5
5	Morocco	76.5
6	Cameroon	72.7
7	South Africa	72.2
8	Tunisia	71.3
9	Mali	71.2
10	Rwanda	69.5

Total Points

Pos.	Name	PPG
1	Angola	574
2	Nigeria	492
3	Senegal	482
4	DR Congo	465
5	Morocco	459
6	Cameroon	436
7	South Africa	433
8	Tunisia	428
9	Mali	427
10	Rwanda	417

Rebounds

Pos.	Name	RPG
1	Nigeria	40.3
2	Cameroon	37.7
3	Senegal	37.5
4	Mali	35.2
5	DR Congo	34.8
6	Morocco	33.8
7	Cape Verde	32.8
8	Mozambique	32.3
9	Rwanda	31.5
10	Ivory Coast	30.7

Assists

Pos.	Name	APG
1	Nigeria	17.8
2	Senegal	17
3	Angola	16.7
4	DR Congo	16.3
5	Tunisia	12.8
6	Mali	12.5
7	Cape Verde	12.3
8	Mozambique	12.3
9	Cameroon	12.2
10	South Africa	11.8

Steals

Pos.	Name	SPG
1	Angola	14
2	Cameroon	13.5
3	Egypt	12.8
4	Morocco	12
5	Tunisia	12
6	Senegal	11.7
7	Mozambique	11.2
8	Liberia	10.8
9	DR Congo	10.3
10	Cape Verde	9.8

Blocks

Pos.	Name	BPG
1	Nigeria	3.8
2	Cameroon	3.5
3	DR Congo	3.5
4	Senegal	3.2
5	Egypt	3
6	Morocco	2.8
7	Angola	2
8	Central African Republic	1.7
9	Tunisia	1.7
10	Cape Verde	1.2

2-point field goal percentage

Pos.	Name	%
1	Angola	69.3
2	Nigeria	61.4
3	DR Congo	59
4	Morocco	57.8
5	Central African Republic	56.9
6	South Africa	56.1
7	Senegal	55.7
8	Tunisia	52.4
9	Cameroon	50.2
10	Mali	49.7

3-point field goal percentage

Pos.	Name	%
1	Angola	40.6
2	Mozambique	33.9
3	Ivory Coast	33.7
4	Senegal	33.6
5	South Africa	33
6	Rwanda	32.6
7	Mali	31.7
8	Tunisia	31.5
9	Egypt	30.5
10	Liberia	30.2

Free throw percentage

Pos.	Name	%
1	Angola	75.9
2	Egypt	72.8
3	Mali	71.3
4	Central African Republic	70.6
5	Tunisia	67.3
6	Cameroon	66.5
7	South Africa	65.6
8	Senegal	65.5
9	Cape Verde	65.5
10	Morocco	64.8

=== Team Game highs ===
Department	Name	Total	Opponent
Points	Angola; Nigeria	109	Rwanda; Liberia
Rebounds	DR Congo; Nigeria	51	Rwanda; Liberia
Assists	Senegal	27	South Africa
Steals	Egypt	26	Mali
Blocks	Nigeria	9	Liberia
2-point field goal percentage	Angola	78.9% (30/38)	Rwanda
3-point field goal percentage	Senegal	52.6% (12/23)	Rwanda
Free throw percentage	Angola	90.9% (20/22)	Cameroon
Turnovers	Liberia	37	Morocco

== See also ==
- 2007 FIBA Africa Clubs Champions Cup
