= 2005 FIBA Africa Championship squads =

Below is a list of team squads at the African Basketball Championships in 2005.

== Algeria ==
- Soufiane Boulaya
- Ali Bouziane
- Karim Atamna
- Redouane Fergati
- Fadji Allah Harouni
- Djillali Canon
- Farouk Djellali
- Nasser Haif
- Mourad Bougheir
- Amine Beramdane
- Abdelhalim Sayah
- Tarek Oukid

== Angola ==
- Olimpio Cipriano
- Armando Costa
- Angelo Victoriano
- Gerson Monteiro
- Vladimir Ricardino
- Carlos Morais
- Joaquim Gomes
- Victor Muzadi
- Abdel Aziz Boukar
- Carlos Almeida
- Miguel Lutonda
- Eduardo Mingas

== Central African Republic ==
- Edgar Kalambani
- Regis Koundija
- Maurice Beyina
- Martial Gotagni
- Lionel Boyamako
- Guy Joseph Kodjo
- Junior Pehoua
- Lionel Pehoua
- Destin Damachoua
- Bienvenu Songondo
- Max Momboilet
- Souleymane Assrangue

== Gabon ==
- Robert Ndong
- Ulrich Essongue
- Bubakar Ambourouet
- Paco Boussougou
- Assoumou Marius
- Fabrice Moussonda
- Marvin Monkoe
- Fabien Bissielou
- Jason Retono
- Stéphane Lasme
- Herve Mepoui
- Irmel Jores Dongo

== Côte d'Ivoire (Ivory Coast) ==
- Kouamé Kouadiou
- Jean-Emmanuel Le Brun
- Morlaye Bangoura
- Jean-Marcel Besse
- Eric Anderson Affi
- Guy Serge Touali
- Kouamé Hervé Kader Abo
- Aristide Yao
- Alain Behinan
- Amadou Dioum
- Hervé Mepoui
- Stéphane Konaté
- Jean Michel Ehui

== Mali ==
- Modibo Niakite
- Namory Diarra
- Amara Sy
- Lansana Sylla
- Ousmane Cisse
- Tahirou Sani
- Sambo Traore
- Lamine Diaware
- Nouha Diakite
- Ahamdou Keita
- Karim Ouattara
- Samake Soumalia

== Morocco ==
- Aymane Jaqouq
- Moustapha Khalfi
- Zouheir Bourouis
- Zakaria Masbahi
- Nabil Bakkas
- Mouak Mohamed
- Mohammed Mouak
- Mounir Bouhelal
- Tarik Bouha
- Mohammed Houari Bassim
- Yassine Bassine
- Said Boustout
- Marouane El Moutalibi

== Mozambique ==
- Fernando Mandlate
- Helton Mazive
- Sansao Matavele
- Silvio Letele
- Guilhaume Cabral
- Victor Tamele
- Khaimane Deus
- Custudio Muchate
- Ricardo Alipio
- Helmano Nhatitima
- Octavio Magulisso
- Sete Muianga

== Nigeria ==
- Kingsley Ogwudire
- Ibrahim Abe Badmus
- Chamberlain Oguci
- Ime Udoka
- Jeff Ngutar Varem
- Abdulrahman Mohammed
- Julius Nwosu
- Ekene Ibekwe
- Tunji Awojobi
- Gabe Muoneke
- Benjamin Eze
- Olumide Oyedeji

== Senegal ==
- Makhtar N'Diaye
- El Kabir Pene
- Alpha Traore
- Babacar Cisse
- Issa Konare
- Maleye N'Doye
- Sidy Faye
- Jules Aw
- Boniface N'Dong
- Souleymane Camara
- Souleymane Wane
- Malick Badiane

== South Africa ==
- Fusi Mazibuko
- Quintin Denyssen
- Nyakallo Nthuping
- Pat Engelbert
- Johan Malan
- Lindokhule Sibankulu
- Many Matando
- Craig Gilchrist
- Lesego Molebatsi
- Neo Mothiba
- Craig Ngobeni
- Chris Trauernicht

== Tunisia ==
- Radhouane Slimane
- Walid Bouslama
- Ali El Amri
- Oussama Ferjani
- Naim Dhifallah
- Marouan Kechrid
- Maher Khenfir
- Marouane Lahmar
- Atef Maoua
- Fouhed Stiti
- Samy Ouellani
- Mejdi Maalaoui

== See also ==
- 2005 FIBA Africa Clubs Champions Cup squads
