= Mutombo (name) =

Mutombo is both a surname and given name in the Tshiluba language. Notable people with this name include:

== Surname ==
- Bibey Mutombo (1961–2008), Congolese footballer and manager
- Dikembe Mutombo (1966–2024), Congolese-American basketball player
- Patrick Mutombo (born 1980), Congolese-Belgian basketball player and coach
- Andréa Mbuyi-Mutombo (born 1990), Belgian footballer

== Given name ==
- Mutombo Lukusa (born in 1981), Congolese basketball player
- Mutombo Bakafwa Nsenda, Congolese debater
