= Mario Neves (basketball) =

Cape Verdean-tuguese basketball player

Mario Neves (born 11 October 1979 in Almada, Portugal) is a Cape Verdean-tuguese professional basketball player with CAB Madeira SAD of the Portuguese Basketball Premier League. Also a member of the Cape Verde national basketball team, Mario Neves Oliveira joined Cape Verde to help them win a bronze medal at the FIBA Africa Championship 2007, qualifying for a wildcard tournament for the 2008 Summer Olympics. He also participated with the team at the FIBA Africa Championship 2009, averaging 6.6 points and 7.2 rebounds per game as the team finished a disappointing 13th place.
