= Keven Gomes =

Cape Verdean basketball player

CB Benicarló
- Position: Center

Personal information
- Born: 29 October 1995 (age 31) Praia, Cape Verde
- Listed height: 2.11 m (6 ft 11 in)

Career history
- –2017: FC Porto
- 2017–2019: SC Lusitânia
- 2019–2021: Imortal Albufeira
- 2021–2022: CD Póvoa
- 2022–present: CB Benicarló

Keven Gomes (born 29 October 1995) is a Cape Verdean professional basketball player who plays as a center for CB Benicarló and the Cape Verde national basketball team.

== Professional career ==
Gomes began his professional career in Portugal with FC Porto, making the transition from Cape Verde to the Portuguese top league in 2017.

He later played for SC Lusitânia, Imortal Albufeira, and CD Póvoa in the Liga Portuguesa de Basquetebol. In 2022, he signed with CB Benicarló in Spain, continuing his career abroad.

== International career ==
Gomes has been a regular member of the Cape Verde national basketball team.

He played at AfroBasket 2015, AfroBasket 2021 qualifiers, and the 2023 FIBA Basketball World Cup, where he averaged 3.4 points and 2.6 rebounds across 5 games.

At AfroBasket 2025, Gomes contributed 4 points and 4.3 rebounds per game. In the decisive group-stage match on 19 August 2025, he scored 14 points with 7 rebounds in 19 minutes, helping Cape Verde reach the quarter-finals.
