= Ejike Ugboaja =

Nigerian basketball player

Personal information
- Born: 28 May 1985 (age 41) Lagos, Nigeria
- Listed height: 6 ft 9 in (2.06 m)
- Listed weight: 225 lb (102 kg)

Career information
- NBA draft: 2006: 2nd round, 55th overall pick
- Drafted by: Cleveland Cavaliers
- Playing career: 2003–2016
- Position: Power forward

Career history
- 2003–2004: Yelwa Hawks
- 2004–2006: UB Lagos
- 2006: Kager Gdynia
- 2007: APOEL Nicosia
- 2007–2008: Albuquerque Thunderbirds
- 2008: Anaheim Arsenal
- 2008–2009: Azad University
- 2009: Azovmash Mariupol
- 2010: Petrochimi Bandar Imam
- 2010: Ford Burgos
- 2011–2012: Jahesh Tarabar Qom
- 2013: Utena Juventus
- 2013–2014: İstanbul Teknik Üniversitesi
- 2014: BC Mark Mentors
- 2016: Kano Pillars Basket
- Stats at Basketball Reference
Medals
Men's basketball
Representing Nigeria
FIBA Africa Championship
Bronze medal – third place	2011 Madagascar	National Team

Ejike Christopher Ugboaja (born 28 May 1985) is a Nigerian professional basketball player who last played for BC Mark Mentors of the Nigerian Premier Basketball League (NPBL). He is also the founder of Ejike Ugboaja Foundation.

== Professional career ==
Ugboaja was selected in the 2006 NBA draft by the National Basketball Association's Cleveland Cavaliers, in the second round with the 55th pick overall. He was a member of the Cavaliers during the 2006–07 season, but did not play in any regular season games with the team. He played in the 2nd-tier Eurocup with Azovmash Mariupol and with BC Odesa.

== Nigerian national team ==
Ugboaja competed at the 2006 Commonwealth Games, the 2007 FIBA Africa Championship, the 2009 FIBA Africa Championship, and the 2011 FIBA Africa Championship with Nigeria. He also played at the 2012 Summer Olympics, with the senior men's Nigerian national basketball team.

== Awards and honours ==
On 28 May 2023, President of Nigeria Mohammadu Buhari honoured Ejike Ugboaja with an Order of the Federal Republic membership.
