= Philip Zwiener =

German basketball player (born 1985)

Personal information
- Born: 23 July 1985 (age 41) Rotenburg an der Wümme, West Germany
- Listed height: 2.01 m (6 ft 7 in)
- Listed weight: 95 kg (209 lb)

Career information
- NBA draft: 2007: undrafted
- Playing career: 2002–2019
- Position: Small forward

Career history
- 2002–2005: Bremen Roosters
- 2005–2007: TuS Lichterfelde
- 2005–2010: Alba Berlin
- 2010–2012: TBB Trier
- 2012–2014: Eisbären Bremerhaven
- 2014–2015: EWE Baskets Oldenburg
- 2015–2016: Eisbären Bremerhaven
- 2016–2019: Baskets Akademie Weser-Ems/Oldenburger TB

Career highlights
- BBL Most Improved Player (2011)

Philip Zwiener (born 23 July 1985) is a former German professional basketball player who lasted played for Baskets Akademie Weser-Ems/Oldenburger TB of the German ProB. Standing at 2.01 m (6 ft 7 in), he played at the small forward position.

== German national team ==
Zwiener was also a member of the Germany national basketball team at the FIBA World Olympic Qualifying Tournament 2008 and 2008 Summer Olympics.
