= Franck Ndongo =

Cameroonian basketball player

Personal information
- Born: 7 December 1988 (age 37) Yaoundé
- Height: 6 ft 7 in (2.01 m)
Medal record
Men's basketball
Representing Cameroon
African Championships
Silver medal – second place	2007 Angola	Cameroon

Franck Ndongo (born 7 December 1988 in Yaoundé) is a Cameroonian college basketball player at Virginia Commonwealth University.

== Biography ==
A graduate of Montverde Academy in Montverde, Florida, Ndongo averaged 1.2 points per game during the 2006–2007 season. He is 6'7" tall and weighs 215 lbs. He competed with the Cameroon national basketball team at the FIBA Africa Championship in 2007. At the FIBA African Championship, Ndongo and Cameroon finished in second place, good enough for qualify for the Olympic Qualifying Tournament to be held in July 2008. He made his first steps in basketball on the SONARA basketball playgrounds in Limbe (Former Victoria in the South West Province of Cameroon). In June 2009 he signed with Augusta State University and will enroll in the school's Hull College of Business graduate program.

== High school ==
At Monteverde, he was a teammate of fellow Cameroonians Stephane Bakinde and Luc Richard Mbah a Moute, both of whom are now playing or have played college basketball in the United States.
