= 2008 FIBA World Olympic Qualifying Tournament for Men =

2008 FIBA World Olympic Qualifying Tournament
For Men

Tournament details
- Host country: Greece
- Dates: 14–20 July
- Teams: 12 (from 5 federations)
- Venue: 1 (in 1 host city)

Official website
- Greece

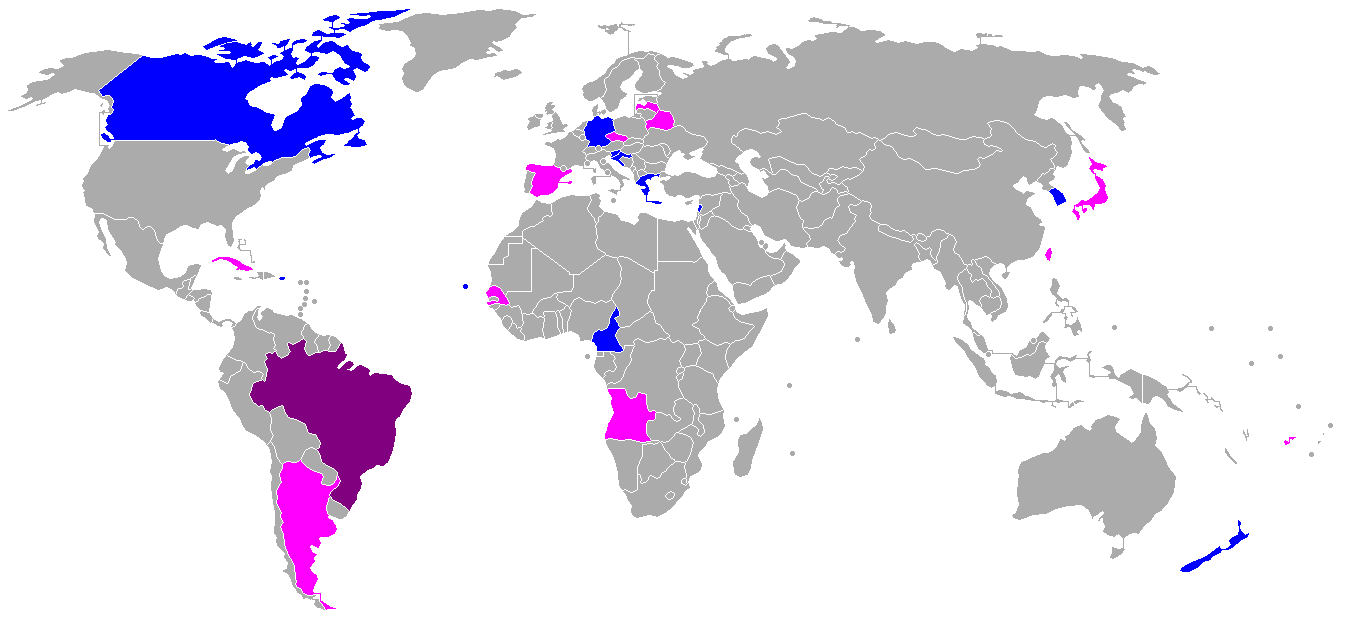
Participating countries in the wildcard tournaments. Men Men and women Women

The FIBA World Olympic Qualifying Tournament for Men 2008 was the final qualifying tournament for the 2008 Olympic men's basketball tournament. Organized by FIBA, it took place from 14 to 20 July 2008 at the OAKA Indoor Sports Arena, in Athens, Greece. The draw for the tournament was held on 31 January 2008 at the Divani Caravel hotel in Athens.

Through this tournament, the final three qualifying berths for the 2008 Olympics men's basketball competition were determined. A total of 12 teams competed in the 2008 FIBA World Olympic Qualifying Tournament from the five FIBA regions, and those 12 teams were based on finishes in each of FIBA's five zone qualifying tournaments. The FIBA Africa Zone placed two teams (runner-up and third place), the FIBA Americas Zone placed three teams (third place, fourth place and fifth place), the FIBA Asia Zone placed two teams (runner-up and third place), the FIBA Europe Zone placed four teams (fourth place, fifth place, sixth place and seventh place), and FIBA Oceania Zone placed one team (runner-up).

The 12 teams were divided into four groups of three teams each and played a single round robin. The two best placed teams from each group qualified for the quarterfinals, semifinals, finals and consolation games which determined the first three places and thus the teams that qualified for the Olympics.

The twelve participating teams were: Brazil, Cameroon, Canada, Cape Verde, Croatia, Germany, Greece, Korea, Lebanon, New Zealand, Puerto Rico, and Slovenia. The three teams that qualified through this tournament—Croatia, Germany and Greece—joined Angola, Argentina, Australia, China, Iran, Lithuania, Russia, Spain and the US in the Beijing Olympics, and had roughly a month to practice and prepare as the Olympic basketball tournament took place on August 9–24.

== Participating nations ==
The teams were divided into three pots, corresponding to their continental zones:

Pot 1	Pot 2	Pot 3
Cameroon; Lebanon; South Korea; Cape Verde	Brazil; Puerto Rico; Canada; New Zealand	Greece; Germany; Croatia; Slovenia

In case a team fails to attend, the next best team from their zone play as their replacements.

== Format ==
- The teams were divided into four groups (Groups A-D) for the preliminary round.
- Round robin for the preliminary round; the top two teams from each group advanced to the quarterfinals. The last-placed team in each group was eliminated.
- A single-elimination tournament was then held; the quarterfinals pairings were:
  - A1 vs. B2
  - B1 vs. A2
  - C1 vs. D2
  - D1 vs. C2
- The semifinal pairings were A1/B2 vs. C1/D2 and B1/A2 vs. D1/C2. The semifinal winners qualified for the Olympics. No championship game was held.
- The semifinal losers played for the last Olympic qualifying berth.

== Preliminary round ==
Qualified for the quarterfinals

=== Group A ===
Team	Pts.	W	L	PCT	PF	PA	Diff
Greece	4	2	0	1.000	208	131	+77
Brazil	3	1	1	.500	163	143	+20
Lebanon	2	0	2	.000	116	213	−97

July 14
22:00

Greece	119–62	Lebanon
Scoring by quarter: 32–17, 22–10, 32–14, 33–21
Pts: Tsartsaris 15; Rebs: Diamantidis 6 Asts: Spanoulis 8		Pts: El Khatib 14; Rebs: three players 3 Asts: Khoury 4

Olympic Indoor Hall, Athens

July 15
22:00

Lebanon	54–94	Brazil
Scoring by quarter: 8–27, 13–21, 16–25, 17–21
Pts: Fahed 15; Rebs: Tawbe 6 Asts: Mahmoud 3		Pts: Huertas 17; Rebs: M. Machado 6 Asts: de Assis 6

Olympic Indoor Hall, Athens

July 16
22:00

Brazil	69–89	Greece
Scoring by quarter: 17–18, 13–22, 20–26, 19–23
Pts: Splitter 20; Rebs: Splitter 7 Asts: three players 1		Pts: Fotsis 18; Rebs: Fotsis 10; Asts: Spanoulis, Diamantidis 4

Olympic Indoor Hall, Athens

=== Group B ===
Team	Pts.	W	L	PCT	PF	PA	Diff
Germany	4	2	0	1.000	193	139	+54
New Zealand	3	1	1	.500	148	139	+9
Cape Verde	2	0	2	.000	118	181	−63

July 14
13:00

New Zealand	77–50	Cape Verde
Scoring by quarter: 21–4, 21–16, 18–12, 17–18
Pts: Penney 25; Rebs: Horvath 8 Asts: Tait 5		Pts: Xavier 22; Rebs: Mascarenhas 11; Asts: Xavier 4

Olympic Indoor Hall, Athens

July 15
15:30

Cape Verde	68–104	Germany
Scoring by quarter: 11–34, 13–25, 16–22, 28–23
Pts: Xavier 21; Rebs: Mascarenhas 8 Asts: Xavier 3		Pts: Nowitzki 16; Rebs: Kaman 10; Asts: Roller 5

Olympic Indoor Hall, Athens

July 16
19:30

Germany	89–71	New Zealand
Scoring by quarter: 23–26, 24–7, 21–24, 21–14
Pts: Nowitzki 35; Rebs: Wysocki 8 Asts: Schultze 4		Pts: Penney 29; Rebs: Bradshaw 8 Asts: Tait 5

Olympic Indoor Hall, Athens

=== Group C ===
Team	Pts.	W	L	PCT	PF	PA	Diff
Slovenia	4	2	0	1.000	174	146	+28
Canada	3	1	1	.500	149	163	−14
South Korea	2	0	2	.000	153	167	−14

July 14
15:30

South Korea	76–88	Slovenia
Scoring by quarter: 17–24, 20–29, 21–16, 18–19
Pts: Kim J.-s. 21; Rebs: Yoon H.-y. 4 Asts: Kim J.-s. 4		Pts: Nesterović 26; Rebs: Nesterović 9 Asts: Bečirovič, Dragić 4

Olympic Indoor Hall, Athens

July 15
13:00

Slovenia	86–70	Canada
Scoring by quarter: 27–22, 14–12, 23–15, 22–21
Pts: Lakovič 19; Rebs: Nesterović 9 Asts: Bečirovič, Joksimović 5		Pts: Barrett 16; Rebs: Kendall, Anthony 6 Asts: Anderson, English 2

Olympic Indoor Hall, Athens

July 16
13:00

Canada	79–77	South Korea
Scoring by quarter: 20–20, 13–29, 26–15, 20–13
Pts: Barrett 22; Rebs: Kendall 14; Asts: Anderson 3		Pts: Jeon J.-g. 19; Rebs: Oh S.-k., Yoon H.-y. 6 Asts: Joo H.-j. 9

Olympic Indoor Hall, Athens

=== Group D ===
Team	Pts.	W	L	PCT	PF	PA	Diff
Croatia	4	2	0	1.000	188	160	+28
Puerto Rico	3	1	1	.500	162	167	−5
Cameroon	2	0	2	.000	151	174	−23

July 14
19:30

Croatia	93–79	Cameroon
Scoring by quarter: 19–16, 26–9, 20–28, 28–26
Pts: Tomas 22; Rebs: Prkačin 6 Asts: Kus 6		Pts: Nana 24; Rebs: Boumtje-Boumtje 10; Asts: Bitee 6

Olympic Indoor Hall, Athens

July 15
19:30

Cameroon	72–81	Puerto Rico
Scoring by quarter: 7–22, 22–24, 19–15, 24–20
Pts: Nana 22; Rebs: Nana 14; Asts: Ekanga-Ehawa 3		Pts: Sánchez 17; Rebs: Sánchez 9 Asts: Rivera 4

Olympic Indoor Hall, Athens

July 16
15:30

Puerto Rico	81–95	Croatia
Scoring by quarter: 26–14, 14–29, 18–27, 23–25
Pts: Ayuso 22; Rebs: Ramos 6 Asts: Arroyo 4		Pts: Kus, Tomas 15; Rebs: Ukić, Banić 6 Asts: Ukić 5

Olympic Indoor Hall, Athens

== Knockout stage ==
Note: Italicized teams qualify for the Olympics.

Quarterfinals; July 18	Semifinals; July 19
A1	Greece	75
B2	New Zealand	48
Greece	88
Puerto Rico	63
C1	Slovenia	70
D2	Puerto Rico	81
B1	Germany	78
A2	Brazil	65
Germany	70	Third place
Croatia	76
D1	Croatia	83
Puerto Rico	82
C2	Canada	62
Germany	96

=== Quarterfinals ===
July 18
13:00

Croatia	83–62	Canada
Scoring by quarter: 18–16, 18–13, 26–13, 21–20
Pts: Popović 17; Rebs: Nicević 6 Asts: Planinić 3		Pts: Famutimi 14; Rebs: Anthony 11; Asts: Anderson 2

Olympic Indoor Hall, Athens

July 18
15:30

Slovenia	70–81	Puerto Rico
Scoring by quarter: 15–21, 19–13, 18–25, 18–22
Pts: Slokar 16; Rebs: Nesterović 11; Asts: Lakovič, Bečirovič 3		Pts: Arroyo 17; Rebs: Mojica 7 Asts: Arroyo 5

Olympic Indoor Hall, Athens

July 18
19:30

Germany	78–65	Brazil
Scoring by quarter: 14–13, 31–13, 17–13, 16–26
Pts: Nowitzki 20; Rebs: Kaman 14; Asts: Nowitzki 5		Pts: Splitter 16; Rebs: Batista, Splitter 6 Asts: E. Machado 4

Olympic Indoor Hall, Athens

July 18
22:00

Greece	75–48	New Zealand
Scoring by quarter: 22–12, 15–8, 18–16, 20–12
Pts: Spanoulis 14; Rebs: Diamantidis 8 Asts: Diamantidis 2		Pts: Tait 9 Rebs: Bradshaw 10; Asts: Vukona 3

Olympic Indoor Hall, Athens

=== Semi-finals ===
July 19
19:00

Germany	70–76	Croatia
Scoring by quarter: 14–24, 17–12, 17–11, 22–29
Pts: Nowitzki 30; Rebs: Nowitzki 13; Asts: Jagla 2		Pts: Tomas 21; Rebs: Barać 7 Asts: Popović 6

Olympic Indoor Hall, Athens

July 19
21:30

Greece	88–63	Puerto Rico
Scoring by quarter: 19–11, 29–24, 20–15, 20–13
Pts: Diamantidis 15; Rebs: Vasilopoulos, Fotsis 7 Asts: Papaloukas 10		Pts: Barea 16; Rebs: Falcon 8 Asts: Arroyo 3

Olympic Indoor Hall, Athens

=== 3rd place match ===
July 20
19:30

Germany	96–82	Puerto Rico
Scoring by quarter: 22–23, 26–16, 26–19, 22–24
Pts: Nowitzki 32; Rebs: Kaman 12; Asts: Hamann, Roller 4		Pts: Barea 18; Rebs: Ramos 9 Asts: Barea 4

Olympic Indoor Hall, Athens

== Final standings ==
Position	Team	Games Won	Games Lost	Points Scored	Points Against	Point Differential	Qualification
	Greece	4	0	371	242	+129	Qualified to 2008 Summer Olympics
	Croatia	4	0	347	292	+55	Qualified to 2008 Summer Olympics
	Germany	4	1	437	362	+75	Qualified to 2008 Summer Olympics
4th	Puerto Rico	2	3	388	416	−28	Did not qualify to 2008 Summer Olympics
5th	Slovenia	2	1	244	227	+17	Did not qualify to 2008 Summer Olympics
6th	Brazil	1	2	228	221	+7	Did not qualify to 2008 Summer Olympics
7th	New Zealand	1	2	196	214	−18	Did not qualify to 2008 Summer Olympics
8th	Canada	1	2	211	240	−29	Did not qualify to 2008 Summer Olympics
9th	South Korea	0	2	153	167	−14	Did not qualify to 2008 Summer Olympics
10th	Cameroon	0	2	151	174	−23	Did not qualify to 2008 Summer Olympics
11th	Cape Verde	0	2	118	181	−63	Did not qualify to 2008 Summer Olympics
12th	Lebanon	0	2	116	213	−97	Did not qualify to 2008 Summer Olympics
