= Odair Sanches =

Cape Verdean basketball player

Medal record

Men's basketball

Representing Cape Verde

African Championships
Bronze medal – third place	2007 Angola	Cape Verde

Odair Sanches is an amateur basketball guard from Cape Verde. Sanches plays for the basketball side of Seven Stars. He played with Cape Verde at the FIBA Africa Championship 2007 in Angola and won the bronze medal.
