= Aloysius Anagonye =

Nigerian-American basketball player

Personal information
- Born: February 10, 1981 (age 45) Southfield, Michigan
- Listed height: 2.03 m (6 ft 8 in)
- Listed weight: 115 kg (254 lb)

Career information
- High school: Saint Martin de Porres (Detroit, Michigan)
- College: Michigan State (1999–2003)
- NBA draft: 2003: undrafted
- Playing career: 2003–2018
- Position: Power forward / center

Career history
- 2003–2004: Union Olimpija
- 2004–2005: Villaggio Solidago Livorno
- 2005–2006: DKV Joventut
- 2006–2007: Los Angeles D-Fenders
- 2007: Premiata Montegranaro
- 2007–2008: Entente Orleans 45
- 2008–2009: Altshuler Saham Galil Gilboa
- 2009–2010: Autocid Ford Burgos
- 2010–2011: Union Olimpija
- 2011–2012: Blancos de Rueda Valladolid
- 2012–2013: Ilysiakos
- 2013–2014: Paris-Levallois
- 2014–2015: SOMB Boulogne-sur-Mer
- 2015–2016: Pertevniyal
- 2016–2018: ALM Évreux Basket

Career highlights
- NCAA champion (2000)

Aloysius Anagonye (born February 10, 1981) is a Nigerian-American former professional basketball player.

== Professional career ==
Anagonye played for Italian Serie A sides Villaggio Solidago Livorno (2004–2005) and Premiata Montegranaro (2006–2007). In 2012, Anagonye signed with Ford Burgos of LEB Oro league, with whom he had played during the 2009–10 season, but he was prevented from playing for the Spaniards due to a FIBA ban on the team's registration of new player.

== International career ==
Although he was born in the United States, Anagonye played internationally with the Nigeria national basketball team at the 2006 FIBA World Championship and the FIBA Africa Championship 2007, where Nigeria finished in 5th place.
