= Mali Alimasi =

Democratic Republic of the Congo basketball player

- Born: November 3, 1984 (age 40)

Alimasi Freddy Mali (born 3 November 1984 in Kinshasa) is a basketball player from the Democratic Republic of the Congo. He represented DR Congo at the 2007 FIBA Africa Championship, where he scored 23 points in 42 minutes over 4 games.
