= Joseph Owona =

Cameroonian basketball player

No. 14 – JSA Bordeaux Basket
- Position: Center
- League: Turkish Basketball League

Personal information
- Born: 26 August 1976 (age 50) Yaounde, Cameroon
- Listed height: 6 ft 9 in (2.06 m)
- Listed weight: 253 lb (115 kg)

Career information
- Playing career: 2002–present

Career history
- 2000–2003: Mérignac
- 2003–2006: Bordeaux
- 2006–2007: Nantes
- 2007–2010: Bordeaux
- 2013–present: Bordeaux
Medals
Men's basketball
Representing Cameroon
FIBA Africa Championship
Silver medal – second place	2007 Angola	Cameroon

Joseph Owona (born 26 August 1976) is a Cameroonian professional basketball player for JSA Bordeaux Basket. He is most noted for being a physician and sport medicine specialist, graduated while still playing basketball. He has helped his national team winning the silver medal at the FIBA Africa Championship 2007, averaging 6.3 rebounds per game. Owona also represented Cameroon at the 2011 Afrobasket, with a seventh-place finish. He was most valuable player in 2006 of the Quai 54 tournament in Paris with team Zikfi. Generally playing center, he was a solid rebounder and defender, several times best shot blocker of the league. Owona was known as "Big Ben" or "DocBen" through his years with his club, returning to Bordeaux shortly after his retirement. He is now a physician in SOS Medecins Bordeaux and Aldo sport physician for French under 18 national team.
