= Octávio Magoliço =

Mozambican basketball player

No. 9 – Ferroviário de Maputo
- Position: Center
- League: Mozambican League

Personal information
- Born: 4 October 1984 (age 42) Maputo, Mozambique
- Listed height: 6 ft 7 in (2.01 m)

Career history
- 2009–?: Ginásio CF
- ?: Costa do Sol
- ?–2018: Ferroviário de Beira
- 2018–present: Ferroviário de Maputo

Octavio Gregorio "Maguila" Magoliço (born 4 October 1984) is a Mozambican basketball player who currently plays for Ferroviário de Maputo of the Mozambican League.

== International career ==
Magoliço is also a member of the Mozambique national basketball team and appeared with the club at the 2005, 2007 and 2009 African Championships. He was Mozambique's leading scorer in both the 2007 and 2009 tournaments, averaging 17.8 and 13.4 points per game, respectively.

== Honours ==
- Mozambican League (2): 2018, 2019
