= Issa Konare =

Senegalese basketball player

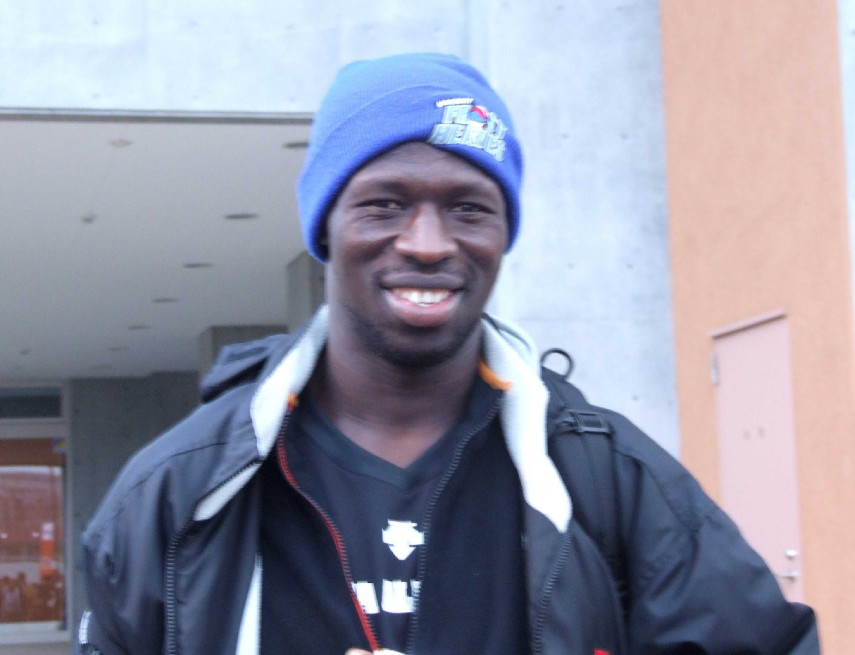
AlbirexBB Issa Konare

Issa Konare (born January 25, 1980) is a retired Senegalese professional basketball player. A 6-foot-8-inch (2.03 m), 230-pound (100 kg) power forward, he was formerly of Summerside Storm of the National Basketball League of Canada, Niigata Albirex of the Bj League in Japan, Kouvot Kouvola of the Finnish League, KFUM Jämtland Basket of the Basketligan Swedish League, as well as Aix-Maurienne Savoie Basket of the ProB League in France and the Vermont Frost Heaves of the American Basketball Association (ABA). He is also a regular with the Senegal National Basketball Team, appearing in all of the FIBA Africa Championships, including 2003, 2005 as well as at the 2007 event.

== Early year ==
Konare was born in Dakar, and spent his formative years playing soccer before he was urged to play basketball by his stepmother at age 17.

== College career ==
In 2001, he was signed by the University of South Carolina in the U.S. but ultimately it did not work out. He eventually found a home, and his future wife, at High Point University in High Point, North Carolina.

== 2005-06 season ==
Konare had 23 points, 10 rebounds and 4 blocks in an 88–72 High Point win over Longwood on December 17, 2005. Other notable performances by Konare in 2005–06 include leading his team with 25 points, 13 rebounds and 5 blocks in an 83–80 loss to Liberty on January 3, 2006, and a 19-point, 10-rebound, 4-block effort in a 78–49 blowout of Liberty on February 25, 2006. Konare received the first-ever Big South Conference defensive player of the year award in 2006, leading the conference with 2.44 blocks per game. He recorded a blocked shot in 25 of 27 games, 18 of 25 having 2+ blocks, and 7 of 18 blocking 4 or more. His total for blocks was 66 and his steals total was 25.

== Personal ==
Konare has seven step-siblings, many who are over 6 feet tall. He and his American wife have a daughter and son.
