= Reda Rhalimi =

Moroccan basketball player

Personal information
- Born: February 2, 1982 (age 44) Salé, Morocco
- Listed height: 6 ft 11 in (2.11 m)

Career information
- College: Saint Mary's College of California
- Position: Center

Career history
- 2006–2007: JDA Dijon
- 2007: Makedonikos B.C.
- 2007: Śląsk Wrocław
- 2008: Purefoods Tender Juicy Giants
- 2008: PAOK Thessaloniki
- 2008: Cholet Basket
- ???: Kyoto Hannaryz

Reda Rhalimi is a Moroccan basketball player.

== Biography ==
He was born on February 2, 1982, in Salé, Morocco and plays center. He is currently playing for Kyoto Hannaryz in the Japanese bj league. He also played for PAOK Thessaloniki, Cholet Basket and Makedonikos B.C.

Rhalimi is a member of the Morocco national basketball team. He participated in both the 2007 and 2009 FIBA Africa Championship.
