= Lionel Bomayako =

Central African Republic-French basketball player

Personal information
- Born: September 15, 1978 (age 48) Bangui, Central African Empire
- Listed height: 6 ft 5 in (1.96 m)
- Listed weight: 215 lb (98 kg)

Career information
- College: Fairleigh Dickinson (1999–2003)
- NBA draft: 2003: undrafted
- Playing career: 2003–present
- Position: Guard

Career history
- 2003–2004: Étendard de Brest
- 2004–2005: JSF Nanterre
- 2005–2006: Ockelbo BBK
- 2005–2006: Besançon BCD
- 2006–2007: Longwy Rehon
- 2007–2008: Geneve Devils
- 2008–2009: UJAP Quimper
- 2010–2012: Zürich Wildcats
- 2012: Orchesien

Lionel Bomayako (born September 15, 1978) is a Central African Republic-French basketball player. He is also a member of the Central African Republic national basketball team.

== Career ==
=== University ===
Bomayako was born in Bangui, Central African Empire and played NCAA Division I basketball at Fairleigh Dickinson University. Bomayako's best season was his senior year in which he averaged 12.4 PPG and 2.4 RPG for the Knights.

=== Club ===
Bomayako has played professional basketball for seven different teams in France, Sweden, and Switzerland in the six years following his 2003 graduation. In his most recent season, 2008–09, he played seven games coming off the bench for Quimper UJAC in France.

=== International ===
Bomayako is also a long-time member of the Central African Republic national basketball team. He participated in the 2005, 2007, and 2009 African Championships, helping the Central African Republic to three consecutive quarterfinal appearances.
