= Churchill Odia =

Nigerian basketball player

Personal information
- Born: November 21, 1985 (age 39); Lagos, Nigeria
- Listed height: 6 ft 6 in (1.98 m)
- Listed weight: 210 lb (95 kg)

Career information
- High school: Montrose Christian School (North Bethesda, Maryland)
- College: Oregon (2004–2009)
- NBA draft: 2009: undrafted
- Position: Small forward

Churchill Ehis Odia (born 21 November 1985 in Lagos) was a Nigerian college basketball player for the Oregon Ducks. In 2007, he played with the Nigeria national basketball team at the FIBA Africa Championship 2007.
