= Tony Barros =

Cape Verdean-American basketball player

Medal record

Men's basketball

Representing Cape Verde

African Championships
| Bronze medal – third place | 2007 Angola | Cape Verde |

Tony Barros (born 3 May 1984) is a Cape Verdean American basketball player with the Cape Verde national basketball team and formerly at the University of Massachusetts Boston. A cousin of former NBA player Dana Barros, Tony Barros helped Cape Verde finishing third in the FIBA Africa Championship 2007. At the tournament, Barros averaged 9.8 points per game and hit the game winning shot against Egypt to clinch the bronze medal. Barros is a graduate of Saint Sebastian's School in Needham, Massachusetts.
