= Manix Auriantal =

Rwandan-Canadian basketball player

Pagé Dynamo
- Position: Guard
- League: Ligue Élite de Basketball Québec

Personal information
- Born: November 8, 1980 (age 46) Montreal, Quebec
- Listed height: 6 ft 2 in (1.88 m)

Career information
- High school: Lucien-Pagé (Montreal, Quebec)
- College: Dawson (2000–2001); Globe Tech (2001–2002); NYIT (2002–2004)
- NBA draft: 2004: undrafted
- Playing career: 2005–present

Career history
- 2014–present: Basketball trainer, coach
- 2012–2013: Montreal Jazz
- 2009–2010: Ittihad Tanger (basket-ball)
- 2008–2009: BC Körmend
- 2007–2008: Union Olimpija
- 2007–2008: Quebec Kebs
- 2005–2006: Montreal Matrix
- 2004–2005: Ulriken Eagles

Career highlights
- NBL Canada steals leader (2013); ABA All-Star (2006); First-team All-NYCAC (2004); ABA All Star-Game (2006)

Manix Auriantal (born August 8, 1980) is a Canadian retired professional basketball player and is now actively dedicated to the next generation of Canadian athletes. He is of Haitian descent. He currently runs a basketball programme for Louis-Joseph Papineau high school in Montreal, Quebec, Canada. Auriantal has played for several teams from his hometown since graduating from the New York Institute of Technology in 2004. He has represented Haiti

in international competition, and played for them at the AfroBasket 2007.

== Collegiate career ==
Auriantal first attended Dawson College in Westmount, Quebec. He then transferred to the Globe Institute of Technology in New York City, United States. After one year, he began attending NYIT in the same city, where he played his final two seasons of basketball.

== Professional basketball career ==
Auriantal played with the Montreal Matrix of the American Basketball Association (ABA) from 2005 to 2006. On February 4, 2006, he was named ABA Player of the Week. Later that month, he was named to the 2006 All-Star Game along with former NBA All-Star Tim Hardaway. Auriantal began competing for BC Körmend of the Nemzeti Bajnokság I/A in Hungary in 2008. On October 18, he made his debut and scored a season-best 17 points vs EnterNet-NTE. The guard moved to the Montreal Jazz of the National Basketball League of Canada (NBL) for the 2012-13 season. He posted a season-high 36 points in a loss to the London Lightning on December 7, 2012 and, by the end of the season, led the league in steals, averaging 2.15 per game.

Some honours:
| Pagé Dynamo | Team twice LBQ champion | 2013–2014 |
| Kebs, Canada | All-Star Team of ABA | 2008 |
| Fiba EuroChallenge | Average of 20 points/match | 2008 |
| Afrobasket, Angola | Second best pointer of the tournament - 18.5 points/match | 2007 |
| Afrobasket, Angola | Second best rebounder of the tournament - 9.5 rebounds permatch | 2007 |
| Matrix, Canada | 1st Canadian participating in the ABA All-Star team | 2006 |
| Matrix, Canada | 1st team All-Star " of the ABA | 2006 |
| NYIT, New York | MVP of the All-Star game | 2004 |
| NYIT, New York | Second team All-Star, NYCAC | 2004 |
| NYIT, New York | 1st team All-Metro States | 2004 |
| NYIT, New York | 1st team playoff All-Star | 2004 |
| Collège Dawson | Twice provincial champion | 1999–2000 |
| Équipe du Québec | New Jersey Showdown All Tournament Team | 1997 |
| Équipe du Québec | Third position in the Canadian Championship | 1997 |
| Lucien Pagé | MVP | 1997–1998 |
| Team Reebok | 12 best players in the United States | 1996 |
| Espoir Montréal | Winning team of the " Jeux du Québec " | 1995 |

== Personal ==
Auriantal studied business at the New York Institute of Technology for his final two years of college. However, he returned to Montreal after graduating. Manix is from a family of seven children. He has three brothers that have also played professional basketball at a relatively high level. Ralph, Hennssy, and Rodwins, all played college basketball on a scholarship in the United States and earned a degree.
