= Brice Vounang =

Cameroonian basketball player

Personal information
- Born: December 3, 1982 (age 43) Baleveng, Cameroon
- Listed height: 6 ft 8 in (2.03 m)
- Listed weight: 250 lb (113 kg)

Career information
- College: Eastern Oklahoma State (2001–2003); San Diego (2003–2005)
- NBA draft: 2005: undrafted
- Playing career: 2006–2015
- Position: Power forward

Career history
- 2006–2007: Go Pass Pepinster
- 2007–2009: Etoile Charleville-Mezieres
- 2011–2015: Étendard de Brest
Medals
Men's basketball
Representing Cameroon
African Championships
Silver medal – second place	2007 Angola	National team

Brice Vounang (born December 3, 1982) is a Cameroonian former professional basketball player. Vounang signed with Étendard de Brest of the French League for the 2009–10 season.

== College career ==
Born in Baleveng, Cameroon, Vounang played two years of NCAA basketball at the University of San Diego after two years of junior college at Eastern Oklahoma State Junior College. In his first season with the Toreros, Vounang averaged 16.9 points per game and 6.8 rebounds per game en route to being named West Coast Conference newcomer of the year. He followed that up with a senior season in which he averaged 15.1 points per game and 7.5 rebounds per game.

== Pro career ==
Vounang began his pro career with one season with Pepinster Go-Pass of the Belgian Professional League. From there, Vounang moved on to French squad Etoile Charleville-Mezieres. In 2008–09, he had his best professional season, averaging 13.9 points per game and 7.5 rebounds per game for the squad. Following this season, he signed with fellow French squad Étendard de Brest.

== Cameroon national team ==
Vounang is captain of the Cameroon national basketball team. He averaged 12.3 points and 7 rebounds per game for the 2007 squad that won the silver medal and a berth in the FIBA World Olympic Qualifying Tournament for Men 2008. Vounang also played on the 2009 FIBA Africa Championship team that finished just off the podium in fourth place.
