= Mário Correia =

Cape Verdean basketball player

Personal information
- Born: March 17, 1978 (age 48) Praia, Cape Verde
- Listed height: 6 ft 2 in (1.88 m)
- Listed weight: 185 lb (84 kg)

Career information
- College: Massasoit CC (2001–2002); Bryant (2002–2005)
- NBA draft: 2005: undrafted
- Position: Forward

Career history
- 2010: Primeiro de Agosto
- 2012–2013: ASA
- 2013–2014: Primeiro de Agosto
- 2015–2016: AD Bairro

Mário “Marito” Correia (born March 17, 1978, in Praia, Cape Verde) is a Cape Verdean professional basketball player. He played for Primeiro de Agosto at the Angolan Basketball League until 2014, before being struck by injury. Correia’s early introduction to basketball started in the District Sports Association Kwame Nkrumah abbreviated to ADESBA-KN. Correia is currently the captain of the Cape Verde national basketball team and helped Cape Verde to a bronze medal at the FIBA Africa Championship 2007, qualifying for a wildcard tournament for the 2008 Summer Olympics.

== Collegiate career ==
Correia attended and played basketball with then-Division II Bryant University from 2002 to 2005. After the 2004–05 season, Correia was named All-Northeast 10 Conference third team after a successful season in which he averaged 13.5 PPG for the Bulldogs. Mario also played the 2001–2002 season at Massasoit Community College where he was named All-New England.

== Professional career ==
After graduating from Bryant, Correia signed with Maia Basket of the Portuguese Proliga.

== International career ==
Correia played his first international game at The FIBA Africa Championship 1997 in Dakar, Senegal. Today Correia is captain of the Cape Verde national basketball team. At the FIBA Africa Championship 2007, he averaged 11.3 PPG and 3.8 RPG to help the Cape Verdeans to a surprise bronze medal. Although the team struggled to a 13th place in the 2009 FIBA Africa Championship, Correia turned in another solid performance, averaging 15.2 PPG, 3.6 RPG, and 2.4 APG over five games.
