= Yelwa Hawks Bauchi =

- Leagues: Nigerian Premier League
Home

Yelwa Hawks Bauchi is a Nigerian professional basketball club. The club competes in the Nigerian Premier League.
