= Patrick Bouli =

Cameroonian basketball player

Personal information
- Born: January 11, 1986 (age 40) Yaoundé, Cameroon
- Listed height: 6 ft 2 in (1.88 m)
- Listed weight: 185 lb (84 kg)

Career information
- High school: Massanutten Military Academy (Woodstock, Virginia)
- College: Manhattan (2006–2010)
- NBA draft: 2010: undrafted
- Position: Guard
Medals
Men's basketball
Representing Cameroon
African Championships
Silver medal – second place	2007 Angola	National team

Patrick Bouli (born January 11, 1986) is a 6 ft 2 in, 185 lbs. guard originally from Yaoundé, Cameroon. He signed with the Manhattan College Jaspers out of the Massanutten Military Academy. He has played three years for the Jaspers, playing primarily off the bench. His best season to date was the 2006-07 season in which he averaged 6.3 points per game and 4.6 rebounds per game in 31 games.

Bouli participated in the 2007 and 2009 FIBA Africa Championship as a member of the Cameroon national basketball team. In 2007, he averaged 9.2 points per game for the Cameroon team that would eventually win the silver medal. Bouli saw less action in 2009 as the team came up just short of qualifying for the 2010 FIBA World Championship by losing the bronze medal game to Tunisia.

Patrick also coaches 7th and 8th grade basketball at the heschel. He joined in November of 2026.
