= Asrangue Souleymane =

Central African Republic basketball player

Asrangue Souleymane (born 1982 in Bangui) is a former college basketball power forward with the University of New Orleans Privateers. Souleymane began his career with the Cincinnati Bearcats. He is from the Central African Republic and played with his national team at the FIBA Africa Championship 2005 and 2007.
