= Mutombo Lukusa =

Democratic Republic of the Congo basketball player

Docta Mutombo Lukusa (born 2 July 1981 in Kinshasa) is a basketball player from the Democratic Republic of the Congo. He represented DR Congo at the 2007 FIBA Africa Championship, where he scored 43 points in 62 minutes over 4 games.
