= Victor Muzadi =

Angolan basketball player (born 1978)

Personal information
- Born: 22 June 1978 (age 48) Libreville, Gabon
- Listed height: 201 cm (6.59 ft)
- Listed weight: 102 kg (225 lb)
- Position: Power forward

Career history
- 2000–2007: Primeiro de Agosto
- 2007–2009: Petro Atlético
- 2010: Interclube
- 2011–2013: ASA

Victor Muzadi (born 22 June 1978 in Gabon) is a retired Angolan professional basketball player. A former member of the Angola national basketball team, Muzadi took part in the 2000 Summer Olympics, 2002 World basketball championships in Indianapolis 2004 Summer Olympics, FIBA Africa Championship 2005 and at the FIBA Africa Championship 2007.

He last played for Angolan side ASA at the Angolan basketball league BAI Basket.

== Personal ==
Born in Gabon in 1978, Muzadi's family left the country as refugees, moving to Angola.

== Professional ==
Muzadi began his professional career at Primeiro de Agosto, where he played from 1998 to 2006. He then joined Petro Atlético, where he played until 2008. In 2005, Muzadi played for the Dallas Mavericks in NBA's Summer League, appearing in 4 games. After failing to enter the NBA, his performance levels deteriorated and he has never been able to perform at the highest level again.
