= Fernando Mandlate =

Mozambican basketball player

Fernando Silvestre Mandlate (born 11 August 1985) is a Mozambique basketball player currently with Maxaquene of the Mozambique Professional Basketball League. He is also a member of the Mozambique national basketball team and appeared with the club at the 2005, 2007 and 2009 African Championships.
