= Lifetu Selengue =

Congolese basketball player (born 1976)

Personal information
- Born: December 27, 1976 (age 49) Kinshasa, DRC
- Listed height: 202 cm (6.63 ft)
- Listed weight: 90 kg (198 lb)
- Position: Center

Career history
- –2002: Primeiro de Agosto
- 2003–2005: Petro Atlético
- 2006: CDUAN
- 2007–2008: Interclube
- 2010: ASA
- 2010–present: Interclube
- 2014–2014: Recreativo do Libolo

Celo Lifetu Selengue (born December 27, 1976, in Kinshasa) is a retired Congolese basketball player. He is listed at 6 feet 3 inches and 203 pounds.

He played for Interclube at the Angolan major basketball league BAI Basket from 2010 to 2013.

In January 2014, he signed a 1-year deal with Recreativo do Libolo.

In March 2014, on the course of the 2013–14 BAI Basket, Primeiro de Agosto filed a claim, accusing Selenge of playing for Recreativo do Libolo as an Angolan national. He was subsequently suspended and accused by the Angolan Basketball Federation of possession of a forged Angolan nationality, possibly facing criminal charges.

== See also ==
- DR Congo national basketball team
