= Parfait Bitee =

Cameroonian basketball player

Towson Tigers
- Title: Assistant coach

Personal information
- Born: 23 July 1985 (age 41) Yaoundé, Cameroon
- Listed height: 189 cm (6.20 ft)
- Listed weight: 86 kg (190 lb)

Career information
- High school: Western (Louisville, Kentucky)
- College: Rhode Island (2004–2008)
- Playing career: 2008–2016
- Position: Point guard
- Coaching career: 2021–present

Career history

Playing
- 2008–2010: Leuven Bears
- 2010: JL Bourg-en-Bresse
- 2011–2012: AS Salé
- 2012–2013: Petro de Luanda
- 2013–2014: Al-Ahli Benghazi
- 2014–2016: Providence Sky Chiefs

Coaching
- 2021–present: Towson (assistant)
Medals
Men's Basketball
Representing Cameroon
FIBA Africa Championship
| Silver medal – second place | Luanda 2007 |
Representing Angola
FIBA Africa Clubs Champions Cup
| Silver medal – second place | Malabo 2012 | Petro Atlético |

Parfait Bitee (born 23 July 1985) is a Cameroonian former basketball player and current coach.

Bitee played college basketball with the University of Rhode Island. In 2006–07, Bitee became the starting point guard and primary ball-handler for the squad. Bitee also played on the Cameroonian men's national basketball team that won the silver medal at the FIBA Africa Championship 2007.

He had an 8-season long professional career in which he played in Belgium, France, Morocco, Angola, Libya and the United States.

== Coaching career ==
After his professional career, Bitee became the director of student-athlete development of Towson University. In 2021, he joined the coaching staff of the Towson Tigers men's basketball team.

Bitee is also an assistant coach for the Cameroon national team since 2018.

== Personal ==
Bitee and his wife, Jillian, have three children, Zayden, Klay, and Zaria. Bitee is a nephew of Petro Atlético head coach Lazare Adingono.
