= Marques Houtman =

Cape Verdean-American basketball player

Medal record

Men's basketball

Representing Cape Verde

African Championships
Bronze medal – third place	2007 Angola	National team

Marques Houtman (born August 18, 1979, in New Bedford, Massachusetts) is a Cape Verdean American basketball point guard. He is an alumnus and two-time Hall of Fame inductee at the University of Massachusetts Dartmouth, where he played college basketball for 2.5 years following 3 semesters at Stonehill College finishing in the sweet 16. Houtman played on the 25–3, #2 in the nation Team at UMD that made it to the Sweet 16 which made him a rare player to play in both Division 2 & 3 NCAA Sweet 16. Houtman is a regular on the Cape Verde national basketball team, including the squad which won a bronze medal at the FIBA Africa Championship 2007 in Angola. Professionally, Houtman played with the Boston Frenzy, coached by Joe "Jellybean" Bryant, father of Kobe Bryant after graduation. He is also a graduate ('97) of New Bedford High School.
