= Joachim Ekanga-Ehawa =

Cameroonian-French basketball player

Medal record

Men's basketball

Representing Cameroon

FIBA Africa Championship
Silver medal – second place	2007 Angola	

Joachim Ekanga-Ehawa (born 7 October 1977) is a Cameroonian-French former professional basketball player.

== Professional career ==
During his professional career, Ekanga-Ehawa played with ÉS Chalon-sur-Saône in the French 1st Division. He was the French 2nd Division French Player's MVP in 2007.

== National team career ==
Ekanga-Ehawa was member of the senior Cameroonian national basketball team. He first represented his country in 2003. In 2007, he won a silver medal at the FIBA Africa Championship.
