= Rodrigo Mascarenhas =

Cape Verdean basketball player

Personal information
- Born: March 24, 1980 (age 46) Rotterdam, Netherlands
- Listed height: 6 ft 6 in (1.98 m)

Career information
- NBA draft: 2002: undrafted
- Playing career: 1999–present
- Position: Forward

Career history
- 2003–2004: Ginásio
- 2004–2007: FC Porto
- 2007–2008: Primero de Agosto
- 2008–2010: ASA
- 2010–2015: Benfica

Career highlights
- 2× FIBA Africa Champions Cup champion (2007, 2008)
Medals
Representing Cape Verde
African Championships
Bronze medal – third place	2007 Angola	Cape Verde

Rodrigo Mascarenhas (born March 24, 1980) is a Cape Verdean-Portuguese former basketball player. Standing at 6 ft 6 in (1.98 m), he played as forward.

== Professional career ==
Mascarenhas played professional basketball in Portugal with F.C. Porto. He then joined countryman Marques Houtman on Angolan side Primero de Agosto at the 2007–08 season and then played for another Angolan team, ASA.

== National team career ==
Mascarenhas currently is the captain of the Cape Verde national basketball team. At the 2007 FIBA Africa Championship, after leading the Cape Verdeans to a surprise third-place finish in the tournament. he was named to the All-Tournament team.
