= Cape Verde men's national basketball team =

Cape Verde
- FIBA ranking: 50 ▼2 (3 March 2026)
- Joined FIBA: 1988
- FIBA zone: FIBA Africa
- National federation: Federação Cabo-verdiana de Basquetebol
- Coach: Emanuel Trovoada
- Nickname: Hammer Sharks

FIBA World Cup
- Appearances: 1

AfroBasket
- Appearances: 8
- Medals: Bronze: (2007)
Home	Away

The Cape Verde national basketball team represents Cape Verde in international basketball matches and is administered by the Federação Cabo-verdiana de Basquetebol.

Its greatest accomplishment was the bronze medal at the AfroBasket 2007, where Cape Verde beat Egypt in its last game.

On 26 February 2023, Cape Verde qualified for their first-ever World Cup when they claimed their ticket to the 2023 FIBA Basketball World Cup. The country became the smallest nation to ever qualify for a World Cup, breaking a record that was held by Montenegro.

== History ==
=== Early development ===
Basketball in Cape Verde gained structure following independence in 1975, but formal organization only began later with the establishment of the Federação Cabo-verdiana de Basquetebol. The federation joined FIBA in 1988.

=== AfroBasket debut ===
Cape Verde debuted in the AfroBasket in 1997, finishing 7th in the nine-team tournament. They returned in 1999 and steadily improved in subsequent editions.

=== Historic bronze at AfroBasket 2007 ===
At the 2007 AfroBasket in Angola, Cape Verde won 62–53 against Nigeria in the quarterfinals, lost to host nation Angola in the semifinals, and won against Egypt 53–51 in the third-place match. This secured Cape Verde’s first-ever medal at the continental championship.

=== Edy "Walter" Tavares joins the team ===
In 2013, center Edy Tavares joined. He was named to the All-Star Five at AfroBasket 2021 and averaged a double-double during World Cup qualifying.

=== World Cup qualification ===
On 26 February 2023, Cape Verde qualified for the FIBA Basketball World Cup for the first time by defeating Ivory Coast in the African qualifiers. With this, Cape Verde became the smallest nation by population ever to reach the World Cup, surpassing Montenegro’s record.

=== World Cup debut ===
At the 2023 World Cup in the Philippines, Cape Verde earned their first-ever win on the world stage by defeating Venezuela 81–75. Edy Tavares contributed 14 rebounds along with defensive dominance to secure the victory.

=== AfroBasket 2025 performance ===
At AfroBasket 2025, Cape Verde continued to rely on Tavares, who set a new personal record with 19 rebounds in the group stage. Despite a 81–82 loss to Côte d’Ivoire, Cape Verde remained in contention for a quarterfinal spot.

== Achievements ==
- Bronze medal at the 2006 Lusophony Games
- Bronze medal at the AfroBasket 2007
- Silver medal at the 2009 Lusophony Games

== Competitive record ==
=== FIBA World Cup ===
Year	Round	Position	GP	W	L
(Argentina) 1990	Did not qualify				
(Canada) 1994	Did not qualify				
(Greece) 1998	Did not qualify				
(United States) 2002	Did not qualify				
(Japan) 2006	Did not qualify				
(Turkey) 2010	Did not qualify				
(Spain) 2014	Did not qualify				
(China) 2019	Did not qualify				
(Philippines) (Japan) (Indonesia) 2023	Classification round	28th	5	1	4
(Qatar) 2027	To be determined				
(France) 2031	To be determined				
Total	1/11		5	1	4

=== AfroBasket ===
Third place Fourth place

Year	Round	Position	GP	W	L
(Angola) 1989	Did not qualify				
(Egypt) 1992	Did not qualify				
(Kenya) 1993	Did not qualify				
(Algeria) 1995	Did not qualify				
(Senegal) 1997	Classification stage	7th	4	1	3
(Angola) 1999	Preliminary round	9th	6	3	3
(Morocco) 2001	Did not qualify				
(Egypt) 2003	Did not qualify				
(Algeria) 2005	Did not qualify				
(Angola) 2007	Third place	3rd	6	4	2
(Libya) 2009	Classification rounds	13th	5	3	2
(Madagascar) 2011	Did not qualify				
(Ivory Coast) 2013	Quarter-finals	6th	7	4	3
(Tunisia) 2015	Round of 16	10th	5	3	2
(Tunisia) (Senegal) 2017	Did not qualify				
(Rwanda) 2021	Fourth place	4th	6	3	3
(Angola) 2025	Quarter-finals	8th	5	3	2
Total	8/17		44	24	20

=== African Games ===
- 2011 – 6th

=== Lusophony Games ===
- 2006 – (bronze)
- 2009 – (silver)
- 2014 – 4th

== Team ==
=== Current roster ===
Roster for the 2025 FIBA AfroBasket.

Cape Verde national basketball team roster
Players
Coaches

Pos.	No.	Name	Age – Date of birth	Height	Club	Ctr.
SG	0	Patrick Lima	30 – 2 May 1995	1.90 m (6 ft 3 in)	CB Andújar	(Spain)
SG	1	Anim Delgado	26 – 3 April 1999	1.90 m (6 ft 3 in)	Jaén Paraíso	(Spain)
F	2	Will Tavares	30 – 18 July 1995	1.95 m (6 ft 5 in)	KB Ylli	(Kosovo)
PF	3	Roesley Sanches	23 – 11 March 2002	2.03 m (6 ft 8 in)	Jaén Paraíso	(Spain)
F	6	Ivan Almeida	36 – 10 May 1989	1.97 m (6 ft 6 in)	Kriol Star	(Cape Verde)
SG	8	Anderson Correia	27 – 31 October 1997	1.95 m (6 ft 5 in)	Kriol Star	(Cape Verde)
SF	9	Joel Almeida	39 – 11 October 1985	1.92 m (6 ft 4 in)	Kriol Star	(Cape Verde)
PF	10	Kenneti Mendes (C)	34 – 17 August 1990	2.03 m (6 ft 8 in)	Kriol Star	(Cape Verde)
PF	12	Amarilson Lopes	29 – 18 August 1995	1.98 m (6 ft 6 in)	Santo André	(Portugal)
C	16	Keven Gomes	29 – 29 October 1995	2.11 m (6 ft 11 in)	CB Benicarló	(Spain)
SF	21	Betinho Gomes	40 – 5 February 1985	2.03 m (6 ft 8 in)	Benfica	(Portugal)
C	22	Edy Tavares	33 – 22 March 1992	2.21 m (7 ft 3 in)	Real Madrid	(Spain)

Head coach

- (Angola) Emanuel Trovoada

Assistant coach(es)

- (Cape Verde) Edmilson Abreu
- (Cape Verde) Manuel Duarte

Legend

- (C) Team captain
- Club – describes last
  club before the tournament
- Age – describes age
  on 12 August 2025

=== Head coach position ===
- (Cape Verde) Carlos Tavares – early 2000s
- (Cape Verde) Manuel da Costa – early 2000s
- (Cape Verde) Rui Silva – early 2000s
- (Angola) Emanuel Trovoada – 2007
- (Cape Verde) Eric Silva – 2008
- (Nigeria) Alex Nwora – 2009–2013
- (Cape Verde) Antonio Tavares – 2014
- (Portugal) Luis Magalhães – 2015
- (Angola) Emanuel Trovoada – 2016–2022
- (Portugal) Jorge Rito – 2023 (e.g., AfroCan 2023 & subsequent competitions)
- (Angola) Emanuel Trovoada – 2024–present (returned after 2023 stint by Rito)

=== Past rosters ===
Team for the 2013 FIBA Africa Championship.

Cape Verde men's national basketball team roster
Players
Coaches

Pos.	No.	Name	Age – Date of birth	Height	Club	Ctr.
F	4	Dimitry Coronel	21 – 13 August 1992	2.01 m (6 ft 7 in)	Maine Univ.	(United States)
G	5	Shane da Rosa	25 – 23 April 1988	1.86 m (6 ft 1 in)	Bristol Community College	(United States)
G/F	6	Avey Oliver	29 – 12 October 1983	1.93 m (6 ft 4 in)	TV Hohenlimburg	(Germany)
G	7	Braima Freire	31 – 19 January 1982	1.84 m (6 ft 0 in)	Seven Stars	(Cape Verde)
G	8	Mário Correia	35 – 17 March 1978	1.89 m (6 ft 2 in)	Promade Cabinda	(Angola)
F	9	Flávio Gomes	24 – 26 December 1988	1.96 m (6 ft 5 in)	AngraBasket	(Portugal)
C	10	Kenneti Mendes	23 – 17 August 1990	2.03 m (6 ft 8 in)	Prédio SGL	(Cape Verde)
C	11	Aldevino Lima	26 – 25 August 1986	2.03 m (6 ft 8 in)	Northeastern	(United States)
C	12	Edy Tavares	21 – 22 March 1992	2.20 m (7 ft 3 in)	Atlanta Hawks	(United States)
G	13	Brian Rudolph, Jr.	24 – 17 September 1988	1.81 m (5 ft 11 in)	Loyola (MD)	(United States)
F	14	Kevin Coronel	21 – 3 September 1991	1.96 m (6 ft 5 in)	Académica do Mindelo	(Cape Verde)
F	15	Rodrigo Mascarenhas	33 – 24 March 1980	1.97 m (6 ft 6 in)	Mindelo Vets	(Cape Verde)

Head coach

- (Nigeria) Alex Nwora

Assistant coach(es)

- (Cape Verde) António Tavares

Legend

- Club – describes last
  club before the tournament
- Age – describes age
  on 20 August 2013

Roster for AfroBasket 2021.

Cape Verde men's national basketball team roster
Players
Coaches

Pos.	No.	Name	Age – Date of birth	Height	Club	Ctr.
SF	0	Patrick Lima	26 – 2 May 1995	1.90 m (6 ft 3 in)	Prédio Basketball	(Cape Verde)
PG	4	Jeff Xavier	35 – 7 September 1985	1.85 m (6 ft 1 in)	Cáceres	(Spain)
F	6	Ivan Almeida	32 – 10 May 1989	1.97 m (6 ft 6 in)	Benfica	(Portugal)
PG	7	Fidel Mendonça	37 – 7 July 1984	1.89 m (6 ft 2 in)	Prédio Basketball	(Cape Verde)
SG	8	Anderson Correia	23 – 31 October 1997	1.92 m (6 ft 4 in)	Chamusca	(Portugal)
SF	9	Joel Almeida	35 – 11 October 1985	1.92 m (6 ft 4 in)	Kutaisi 2010	(Georgia (country))
PF	10	Kenneti Mendes	31 – 17 August 1990	2.03 m (6 ft 8 in)	Galitos	(Portugal)
SF	11	Patrick Abreu	30 – 20 March 1991	1.91 m (6 ft 3 in)	Prédio Basketball	(Cape Verde)
C	13	Sekouba Condé	31 – 31 December 1989	2.01 m (6 ft 7 in)	Viana	(Angola)
C	14	Ailton Lopes	25 – 18 September 1995	2.05 m (6 ft 9 in)	CB Clavijo	(Spain)
PF	15	Kevin Coronel	29 – 3 September 1991	1.98 m (6 ft 6 in)	Tarragona	(Spain)
C	22	Edy Tavares	29 – 22 March 1992	2.21 m (7 ft 3 in)	Real Madrid	(Spain)

Head coach

- (Angola) Emanuel Trovoada

Assistant coach(es)

- (Cape Verde) Edmilson Abreu
- (Cape Verde) Danielson Miranda

Legend

- Club – describes last
  club before the competition
- Age – describes age
  on 24 August 2021

Roster for the 2023 FIBA Basketball World Cup.

Cape Verde men's national basketball team – 2023 FIBA Basketball World Cup roster
Players
Coaches

Pos.	No.	Name	Age – Date of birth	Height	Club	Ctr.
SG	0	Nathan Pires	13 – 15 July 2010	1.90 m (6 ft 3 in)	CB Almería	(Spain)
PG	5	Shane Da Rosa	35 – 23 April 1988	1.85 m (6 ft 1 in)	Providence Pirates	(United States)
F	6	Ivan Almeida	34 – 10 May 1989	1.97 m (6 ft 6 in)	Benfica	(Portugal)
PG	7	Fidel Mendonça (C)	39 – 7 July 1984	1.89 m (6 ft 2 in)	Prédio Basketball	(Cape Verde)
SG	8	Anderson Correia	25 – 31 October 1997	1.95 m (6 ft 5 in)	Sangalhos DC	(Portugal)
SF	9	Joel Almeida	37 – 11 October 1985	1.92 m (6 ft 4 in)	FAP	(Cameroon)
PF	10	Kenneti Mendes	33 – 17 August 1990	2.03 m (6 ft 8 in)	FAP	(Cameroon)
F	13	Will Tavares	28 – 18 July 1995	1.95 m (6 ft 5 in)	BC Yambol	(Bulgaria)
SF	15	Kevin Coronel	31 – 3 September 1991	1.96 m (6 ft 5 in)	Portimonense	(Portugal)
C	16	Keven Gomes	27 – 29 October 1995	2.11 m (6 ft 11 in)	FC Porto	(Portugal)
SF	21	João Gomes	38 – 5 February 1985	2.03 m (6 ft 8 in)	Benfica	(Portugal)
C	22	Edy Tavares	31 – 22 March 1992	2.21 m (7 ft 3 in)	Real Madrid	(Spain)

Head coach

- (Angola) Emanuel Trovoada

Assistant coach(es)

- (Cape Verde) Manuel Duarte
- (Cape Verde) Danielson Miranda

Legend

- (C) Team captain
- Club – describes last
  club before the competition
- Age – describes age
  on 25 August 2023

== Kit ==
=== Manufacturer ===
2015 – Peak

2025 – Dhika

=== Sponsor ===
2015 – Zap

== See also ==
- Cape Verde women's national basketball team
