= List of Angola men's national basketball team players =

This article aims at showing the evolution of the Angola national basketball team throughout the 1980s, 1990s and 2000s in such competitions as the FIBA Africa Championship, the Olympic Games and the FIBA World Championship.

== 2011–2017 ==
Angola national basketball team players 2011–2017
A = African championship; # = African championship winner; W = World cup

#	Name	A	P	H	W	C	M.G.	Paulo Macedo			C.D.	M.S.	W.V.
#	Name	A	P	H	W	C	2011	2013	2014	2015	2016	2017	2017
#	Name	A	P	H	W	C	A	A	W	A	E	–	–
22	Alexandre Jungo	19	PF	2.02		(Angola) INT	-	-	-	-	-	-	2017
–	Armando Costa	34	PG	1.92		(Angola) PRI	5	5	5	5	-	5	-
–	Braulio Morais	24	PG	1.90		(Angola) LIB	-	-	-	14	-	-	-
–	Bruno Fernandes	17	C	2.02		(United States) MTV	-	-	-	-	11	-	-
–	Carlos Almeida	36	SF	1.93		(Angola) PRI	-	13	-	-	-	-	-
6	Carlos Morais	31	SG	1.93		(Portugal) SLB	6	6	-	6	6	6	2017
–	Domingos Bonifácio	26	PG	1.89		(Angola) LIB	7	-	-	-	-	-	-
–	Edson Ndoniema	25	SG	1.93		(Angola) PRI	-	-	7	4	14	-	-
15	Eduardo Mingas	38	PF	1.98		(Angola) INT	15	15	15	15	-	15	2017
–	Felizardo Ambrósio Miller	29	PF	2.02		(Angola) PRI	12	12	-	12	12	12	-
1	Gerson Domingos	20	PG	1.91		(Angola) INT	-	-	-	-	2	-	2017
3	Gerson Gonçalves	21	SG	1.93		(Angola) PET	-	-	-	-	3	3	2017
16	Hermenegildo Mbunga	31	C	2.06		(Angola) LIB	-	-	-	-	-	-	2017
–	Hermenegildo Santos Gildo	25	PG	1.88		(Angola) PRI	-	8	8	8	8	-	-
–	Islando Manuel Papa Ngulo	25	SF	1.95		(Angola) PRI	-	-	13	-	13	-	-
–	Joaquim Gomes Kikas	33	C	2.02		(Angola) PRI	10	10	10	-	-	-	-
–	Jorge Tati	28	F	1.95		(Angola) INT	13	-	-	-	-	-	-
37	Leandro da Conceição	28	PG	1.95		(Angola) PRI	-	-	-	-	-	37	2017
9	Leonel Paulo	31	SF	1.98		(Angola) PET	9	9	-	9	9	9	2017
–	Miguel Kiala	20	C	1.98		(Angola) PET	11	-	-	-	-	-	-
–	Milton Barros	30	PG	1.83		(Angola) LIB	14	14	14	-	-	-	-
4	Olímpio Cipriano	35	SF	1.93		(Angola) LIB	-	4	4	-	-	4	2017
23	Reggie Moore	36	F	2.00		(Angola) LIB	-	11	11	11	23	23	2017
7	Roberto Fortes	32	SG	1.93		(Angola) LIB	-	-	6	7	-	7	2017
–	Silvio Sousa	18	C	2.03		(United States) MTV	-	-	-	-	10	22	-
–	Simão Santos	29	SF	1.98		(Angola) LIB	8	-	-	-	-	-	-
–	Valdelício Joaquim Vander	26	C	2.09		(Angola) LIB	4	7	9	10	15	-	-
2	Yanick Moreira	26	C	2.11		(Russia) PAR	-	-	12	13	-	1	2017

== 2001–2010 ==
Angola national basketball team players 2001–2010
A = African championship; # = African championship winner; W = World cup; O = Olympic tournament

Name	P	A	H	W	Mário Palma					Alberto Carvalho			Magalhães	
Name	P	A	H	W	2001	2002	2003	2004	2005	2006	2007	2008	2009	2010
Name	P	A	H	W	A	W	A	O	A	W	A	O	A	W
Abdel Bouckar	C	28	2.03		-	-	12	12	12	12	-	12	-	-
Adolfo Quimbamba	SF	27	1.97		-	-	-	-	-	-	-	-	11	-
Afonso Silva	SF	29	1.90		-	12	4	-	-	-	-	-	-	-
Angelo Victoriano	F	37	1.96		6	6	6	6	6	-	-	-	-	-
Armando Costa	PG	–	1.92		-	-	-	-	5	5	5	5	5	-
Buila Katiavala	C	25	2.06		9	-	-	-	-	-	-	-	-	-
Carlos Almeida	SF	–	1.93		13	13	13	13	13	13	13	13	13	13
Carlos Morais	SG	–	1.93		-	-	-	-	9	6	6	6	6	6
David Dias	PF	32	1.99		12	-	-	-	-	-	-	-	-	-
Domingos Bonifácio	PG	–	1.89		-	-	-	-	-	-	-	-	7	7
Edmar Victoriano Baduna	F	29	1.95		8	8	8	8	-	-	-	-	-	-
Eduardo Mingas	PF	–	1.98		-	15	-	15	15	15	15	15	15	15
Emanuel Neto	C	22	2.06		-	-	-	-	-	11	-	-	-	-
Felizardo Ambrósio Miller	C	–	2.01		-	-	-	-	-	-	12	11	12	12
Filipe Abraão	SF	30	1.94		-	-	-	-	-	-	-	-	14	-
Gerson Monteiro	F	32	1.90		7	7	7	7	7	-	-	-	-	-
Hermenegildo Mbunga	C	25	2.06		-	-	-	-	-	-	-	-	-	11
Jean-Jacques	PF	39	1.98		15	-	15	-	-	-	-	-	-	-
Joaquim Gomes Kikas	C	–	2.02		-	10	10	10	10	10	10	10	10	10
José Nascimento	PF	23	1.96		10	-	-	-	-	-	-	-	-	-
Leonel Paulo	PF	–	1.98		-	-	-	-	-	-	-	14	9	8
Luis Costa	SF	31	1.94		-	-	-	-	-	8	8	8	8	-
Mario Belarmino	PF	28	1.96		11	11	-	-	-	-	-	-	-	-
Miguel Lutonda	PG	39	1.85		14	14	14	14	14	14	14	-	-	14
Milton Barros	PG	–	1.83		-	-	-	-	-	7	7	7	-	-
Olímpio Cipriano	SF	–	1.93		-	-	-	4	4	4	4	4	4	4
Roberto Fortes	F	–	1.93		-	-	-	-	-	-	-	-	-	5
Victor de Carvalho	SG	38	1.93		-	9	9	9	-	9	9	-	-	-
Victor Muzadi	C	29	2.01		4	4	11	11	11	-	11	-	-	-
Vladimir Ricardino	C	32	2.03		-	-	-	-	8	-	-	9	-	9
Walter Costa	PG	31	1.85		5	5	5	5	-	-	-	-	-	-

== 1991–2000 ==
Angola national basketball team players 1991–2000
A = African championship; # = African championship winner; W = World cup; O = Olympic tournament

Name	P	A	H	W	Victorino Cunha				Wlad. Romero			M. Palma	
Name	P	A	H	W	1992	1992	1993	1994	1995	1996	1997	1999	2000
Name	P	A	H	W	O	A	A	W	A	O	A	A	O
Afonso Silva	SF	–	1.90		-	-	-	-	-	-	13	-	-
Angelo Victoriano	F	–	1.96		6	6	6	11	6	6	6	6	6
Aníbal Moreira	F	–	1.93		5	5	5	5	5	5	5	5	5
Benjamim Romano	PG	27	1.90		4	-	4	8	-	13	-	-	-
Benjamim Ucuahamba Avô	PG	32	1.83		7	7	7	14	7	7	7	-	-
Buila Katiavala	C	–	2.06		-	-	-	-	-	-	-	-	15
Carlos Almeida	SF	–	1.93		-	-	-	-	-	-	-	13	13
Cristóvão Swingue	PG	23	1.82		-	-	-	-	-	-	-	7	-
David Dias	PF	–	1.99		12	12	12	12	12	12	12	12	12
Edmar Victoriano Baduna	F	–	1.95		-	-	-	-	8	4	4	8	8
Garcia Domingos	PG	29	1.93		-	-	-	7	-	-	10	-	7
Herlander Coimbra	F	32	2.01		8	10	10	10	10	10	-	10	10
Honorato Trosso	SF	27	1.90		-	8	8	4	-	8	8	-	-
Ivo Alfredo	C	26	2.05		-	-	-	6	-	-	-	-	-
Jean-Jacques	PF	–	1.98		15	15	15	15	15	-	-	15	-
Joaquim António Quinzinho	PG				-	4	-	-	4	-	-	-	-
Joaquim Gomes Kikas	C	–	2.02		-	-	-	-	-	-	-	11	-
José Carlos Guimarães Zé Carlos	SG	32	1.90		14	14	-	-	14	14	-	-	-
Justino Victoriano Puna	C	25	2.02		-	-	-	-	13	11	11	4	-
Manuel Sousa Necas	SG	30	1.85		9	9	-	-	-	-	-	-	-
Mario Belarmino	PF	–	1.96		-	-	-	-	-	-	-	-	11
Miguel Lutonda	PG	–	1.85		-	-	-	-	-	-	14	14	14
Nelson Sardinha Futuro	C	29	2.00		11	11	11	-	11	-	-	-	-
Paulo Macedo	PG	26	1.87		13	13	13	13	-	-	-	-	-
Sílvio Lemos	PG	20	1.90		-	-	14	-	-	-	-	-	-
Victor de Carvalho	SG	–	1.93		10	-	9	9	9	9	9	9	9
Victor Muzadi	C	–	2.01		-	-	-	-	-	-	-	-	4

== 1981–1990 ==
Angola national basketball team players 1981–1990
A = African championship; # = African championship winner; W = World cup

Name	P	A	H	Palma	Victorino Cunha						
Name	P	A	H	1980	1981	1983	1985	1986	1987	1989	1990
Name	P	A	H	A	A	A	A	W	A	A	W
Admar Barros	PG	?	1.84	-	-	-	12	-	11	8	8
Adriano Baião	C			-	-	1983	-	12	12	-	-
Ângelo Victoriano	F	–	1.96	-	-	-	-	-	8	7	6
Aníbal Moreira	F	–	1.93	-	-	-	5	5	5	5	5
António Cristo	PF		1.94	-	-	-	-	-	-	6	-
António Guimarães	C	31	1.93	1980	1981	-	-	-	-	-	-
António Henriques Tonecas				1980	-	-	-	-	-	-	-
Arnaldo Guimarães				1980	-	-	-	-	-	-	-
Artur Barros	C	24	1.96	-	1981	1983	8	8	-	-	-
Carlos Cunha	PF	23	1.91	1980	-	-	-	-	-	-	-
Carlos Oliveira				1980	-	-	-	-	-	-	-
David Dias	PF	–	1.99	-	-	-	-	6	6	12	12
Diogo Cruz Didí	PF	23	1.94	-	1981	-	-	-	-	-	-
Eurico Araújo Boneco	PG	1.76	21	-	-	1983	7	-	-	-	-
Fernando Antas Gito				-	1981	-	-	-	-	-	-
Fernando Barbosa Barbosinha	SF			1980	1981	-	-	-	-	-	-
Francisco Carlos Cungulo	SF		19	-	-	-	11	11	-	-	-
Gil Almeida				-	-	1983	-	-	-	-	-
Gustavo da Conceição	PF	30	1.92	1980	1981	1983	13	13	13	-	-
Herlander Coimbra	F	–	2.01	-	-	-	-	-	-	11	10
Hilário de Sousa				1980	1981	-	-	-	-	-	-
Honorato Trosso	SF	–	1.90	-	-	-	-	-	-	4	-
Ivo Alfredo	C	–	2.05	-	-	-	-	-	-	-	4
Jean-Jacques	PF	–	1.98	-	-	1983	15	15	15	15	15
José Assis Zezé Assis †	F	27	1.89	-	1981	-	10	10	10	10	-
José Carlos Guimarães Zé Carlos	SG	–	1.90	-	1981	1983	14	14	14	14	14
Josué Campos	PG			-	-	1983	4	4	4	-	-
Luís Filipe De Deus Lagos Fernandes dos Santos Gika				1980	-	-	-	-	-	-	-
Manuel F.S. Clemente Júnior Nijó	C			-	-	1983	-	-	-	-	-
Manuel Narciso Neco	PG	20	1.85	-	1981	-	-	-	-	-	-
Manuel Sousa Necas	SG	–	1.85	-	-	1983	9	9	9	9	9
Mário Octávio †	PG	28	1.75	1980	1981	-	-	-	-	-	-
Nelson Sardinha Futuro	C	–	2.00	-	-	-	-	-	-	-	11
Paulo Macedo	PG	–	1.87	-	-	-	-	7	7	13	13
Paulo Sucacuexe				-	-	-	6	-	-	-	-
Rui Marques				1980	-	-	-	-	-	-	-
Sidrack da Conceição	C	1.98	29	-	-	1983	-	-	-	-	-
Victor Almeida	PG			1980	1981	1983	-	-	-	-	-
Victor de Carvalho	SG	–	1.93	-	-	-	-	-	-	-	7

== See also ==
- Angola national basketball team
- Angola national basketball team U18
- Angola national basketball team U16
- BAI Basket
- Federação Angolana de Basquetebol
- List of Angola international footballers
- List of Angola women's national handball team players
