= List of C.D. Primeiro de Agosto men's basketball players =

This article is about the list of C.D. Primeiro de Agosto (basketball) players. Clube Desportivo Primeiro de Agosto is an Angolan basketball club based in Luanda, Angola and plays at Pavilhão Victorino Cunha. The club was established in 1977.

== 2011–2018 ==
C.D. Primeiro de Agosto basketball players 2011–2018 L = Angola league winner; C = African champions cup winner
Nat	#	Name	A	P	H	W	L.M.	Paulo Macedo			Ricard Casas			P.M.
Nat	#	Name	A	P	H	W	2011	2012	2013	2014	2015	2016	2017	2018
Nat	#	Name	A	P	H	W		C	LC			L		
(Angola)	-	Adilson Baza	28	PG	1.85		6	6	6	6	-	-	-	-
(Angola)	6	Adilson Ramos	29	SF	1.79	–	-	-	-	-	-	-	→	2018
(Angola)	-	Adolfo Quimbamba	29	SF	1.97	104	12	-	-	-	-	-	-	-
(Angola)	-	Agostinho Coelho	25	SF	1.98	90	-	2012	15	15	15	→	-	-
(Angola)	5	Armando Costa	34	PG	1.92	91	5	2012	5	5	5	5	5	2018
(Angola)	-	Bráulio Morais	27	PG	1.85	90	-	-	-	-	-	→	INJ	→
(Angola)	-	Carlos Almeida	37	SF	1.93	91	13	13	13	-	-	-	-	-
(Angola)	2	Carlos Cabral	23	SG	1.85	95	-	-	-	-	-	-	→	2018
(United States)	-	Cedric Isom	32	SG	1.88	88	→	2012	12	12	12	12	→	-
(Angola)	-	Domingos Bonifácio	28	PG			2011	2012	→	-	-	-	-	-
(Angola)	-	Edmir Lucas	22	SG	1.88	88	-	2012	7	14	17	–	→	-
(Angola)	4	Edson Ndoniema	26	SF	1.91	90	-	-	→	4	4	4	4	2018
(Angola)	20	Eduardo Mingas	39	C	1.98	106	-	-	-	-	-	-	→	2018
(Angola)	9	Felizardo Ambrósio Miller	30	C	2.02	110	9	9	9	9	9	9	9	2018
(Angola)	-	Filipe Abraão	34	SF	1.94	88	4	4	4	-	-	-	-	-
(Angola)	-	Francisco Machado	33	C	2.05	98	-	2012	17	17	-	-	-	-
(Angola)	-	Francisco Sousa	34	PG	1.84	83	-	-	-	→	1	1	→	-
(Angola)	-	Gerson Monteiro	39	SF			-	2012	-	-	-	-	-	-
(Angola)	21	Gilson Bango		2.06	82		-	-	-	--	-		→	2018
(Angola)	-	Hélder Ortet	31	C	2.01		2011	2012	11	-	-	-	-	-
(Angola)	16	Hermenegildo Santos Gildo	27	PG	1.88	84	16	16	16	16	16	16	16	2018
(Angola)	18	Islando Manuel Papa Ngulo	26	PF	1.92	102	2011	2012	18	18	18	18	18	2018
(Angola)	-	Joaquim Gomes Kikas	37	PF	2.00	103	8	2012	10	10	10	10	10	-
(Angola)	10	Jocelino Ricardo	-	-	-	-	-	-	-	-	--	-	→	2018
(Angola)	7	Jone Pedro	28	C	2.08	95	-	-	-	-	7	INJ	7	2018
(Angola)	-	Jorge Tati	33	SF	1.95	107	-	-	-	-	→	8	→	-
(United States)	-	Karlton Mims	31	-	1.88	86	15	-	-	-	-	-	-	-
(Angola)	-	Leonel Paulo	26	-			2011	2012	-	-	-	-	-	-
(Dominican Republic)	12	Manny Quezada	33	SG	1.84	84	-	-	-	-	-	→	12	2018
(Angola)	-	Mário Correia Marito	36	SG			7	2012	–	7	-	-	-	-
(Angola)	-	Miguel Lutonda	41	PG	1.86	78	14	14	-	-	-	-	-	-
(Angola)	19	Milton Valente	-	-	-	-	-	-	-	-	--	-	→	2018
(Angola)	3	Mohamed Cissé	28	PF	1.98	90	-	-	-	-	19	19	19	2018
(Angola)	11	Mutau Fonseca Mutu	28	C	2.00	105	-	-	–	11	11	11	11	2018
(Angola)	-	Reggie Moore	34	PF	1.98	107	2011	2012	8	8	8	→	-	-
(United States)	-	Roderick Nealy	35	PF	2.01	95	-	-	-	→	23	→	-	-
(Angola)	8	Sebastião Quicuame	30	-	1.96		-	-	-	-	-	-	→	2018
(Angola)	-	Tárcio Domingos	19	-			-	-	-	-	→	15	15	→
(France)	-	Tariq Kirksay	39	PF	1.99	90	-	-	-	-	→	21	21	-
(Angola)	-	Vladimir Ricardino	39	-			18	→	-	-	-	→	9	-
(Angola)	17	Wilson Ambrósio					-	-	-	--	-		→	2018
(Angola)	-	Yanick Moreira	20	C	2.10		17	→	-	-	-	-	-	-

== 2001–2010 ==
C.D. Primeiro de Agosto basketball players 2001–2010
L = Angola league winner; C = African champions cup winner

Nat	Name	A	P	H	W	Mário Palma					J. Covilhã		Luís Magalhães		
Nat	Name	A	P	H	W	2001	2002	2003	2004	2005	2006	2007	2008	2009	2010
Nat	Name	A	P	H	W	L	LC	L	LC	L	–	C	LC	LC	LC
(Angola)	Abdel Bouckar	30	C	2.08	109	2001	2002	-	-	-	2006	2007	-	-	-
(Angola)	Adilson Baza	–	PG	1.85		-	-	-	-	-	-	-	2008	-	2010
(Angola)	Adolfo Quimbamba	–	SF	1.97	104	-	-	-	-	-	-	-	-	-	2010
(Angola)	Afonso Silva	30	SF	1.91	92	2001	2002	2003	2004	-	-	-	-	-	-
(Angola)	Angelo Victoriano	38	PF	1.96	112	2001	2002	2003	2004	2005	2006	-	-	-	-
(Angola)	Aníbal Moreira	35	F	1.93		2001	-	-	-	-	-	-	-	-	-
(Angola)	Armando Costa	–	PG	1.92	91	-	-	-	-	2005	2006	2007	2008	2009	-
(Angola)	Buila Katiavala	30	C	2.16	102	2001	2002	2003	2004	-	2006	-	-	-	-
(Angola)	Carlos Almeida	–	SF	1.93	91	-	2002	2003	2004	2005	2006	2007	2008	2009	13
(Angola)	Cristóvão Swingue	29	PG	1.86	81	-	-	-	2004	2005	-	-	-	-	-
(United States)	Daryl C. Battles		-			-	2002	-	-	-	-	-	-	-	-
(Angola)	Edmar Victoriano Baduna	29	PF	1.95	88	-	2002	2003	2004	-	-	-	-	-	-
(Angola)	Euclides Camacho	25	-			-	-	-	-	2005	-	-	-	-	-
(Angola)	Felizardo Ambrósio Miller	–	C	2.02	110	-	-	-	-	-	-	2007	2008	2009	9
(Angola)	Fernando Albano	29	SG			2001	-	-	-	-	-	-	-	-	-
(Angola)	Filipe Abraão	–	SF	1.94	88	-	-	-	-	-	-	-	-	2009	2010
(Portugal)	Francisco Jordão	29	C	2.00		-	-	-	-	-	-	2007	2008	-	-
(Angola)	Garcia Domingos	32	PG	1.93		2001	2002	2003	-	-	-	-	-	-	-
(Angola)	Hélder Ortet	–	C	2.01		-	-	-	-	-	-	-	-	-	2010
(Angola)	Herlander Coimbra	33	F	2.01		2001	-	-	-	-	-	-	-	-	-
(Angola)	Hermenegildo Santos Gildo	–	PG	1.88	84	-	-	-	-	-	-	-	-	-	2010
(Angola)	João Neto	28	-			-	-	-	-	2005	-	-	-	-	-
(Angola)	Joaquim Gomes Kikas	–	PF	2.00	103	-	-	-	-	-	2006	2007	2008	2009	8
(Angola)	José Nascimento	23	PF	1.96		2001	-	-	-	-	-	-	-	-	-
(Angola)	José Santos Castro		PG			-	2002	2003	2004	-	-	-	-	-	-
(United States)	Karlton Mims	–	-			-	-	-	-	-	-	-	-	-	15
(Democratic Republic of the Congo)	Lifetu Selengue Celio	26	C	2.05	90	2001	2002	-	-	-	-	-	-	-	-
(Angola)	Mário Correia Marito	–	F			-	-	-	-	-	-	-	-	2009	7
(Cape Verde)	Marques Houtman	28	SG	1.90		-	-	-	-	-	-	2007	-	-	-
(Angola)	Martins Masssunga	28	SG			2001	-	-	-	-	-	-	-	-	-
(Angola)	Mayzer Alexandre	24	SG	1.84		-	-	-	2004	-	2006	2007	2008	-	-
(Angola)	Miguel Lutonda	–	PG	1.86	78	2001	2002	2003	2004	2005	2006	2007	2008	2009	14
(Democratic Republic of the Congo)	Muamba Ilunga	21	PF			-	-	-	-	2005	-	-	-	-	-
(Nigeria)	Obiora Nnajo	27	C	2.11	105	-	-	-	-	2005	-	-	-	-	-
(Angola)	Olímpio Cipriano	28	F	1.94	93	-	2002	2003	2004	2005	2006	2007	2008	-	-
(Angola)	Paulo Muquixe		-			-	-	2003	-	-	-	-	-	-	-
(Cape Verde)	Rodrigo Mascarenhas	30	PF	1.96		-	-	-	-	-	-	2007	2008	2009	-
(Angola)	Simão João		-			-	-	-	-	-	-	-	2008	-	-
(Angola)	Tsheke Kofi		C			-	-	2003	2004	-	-	-	-	-	-
(Angola)	Victor Muzadi	32	C	2.01	102	2001	2002	2003	2004	2005	2006	-	-	-	-
(Angola)	Vladimir Ricardino	–	PF	2.03	93	-	-	-	2004	2005	2006	2007	2008	2009	18
(Angola)	Walter Costa	37	PG	1.85	82	2001	2002	2003	2004	2005	2006	-	-	-	-
(Angola)	Wilson da Mata		-			-	-	2003	2004	-	-	-	-	-	-

== 1991–2000 ==
C.D. Primeiro de Agosto basketball players 1991–2000
# = Angola league winner

Nat	Name	A	P	H	W	Victorino Cunha							F.B.	M. Palma	
Nat	Name	A	P	H	W	1991	1992	1993	1994	1995	1996	1997	1998	1999	2000
Nat	Name	A	P	H	W	–	–	–	–	–	–	–	–	–	–
(Angola)	Afonso Silva	–	SF	1.91	92	-	-	-	-	-	-	-	1998	-	2000
(Angola)	Ângelo Victoriano	–	PF	1.96	112	-	-	-	-	-	-	-	1998	-	2000
(Angola)	Cadete		-			-	-	-	-	1995	-	-	-	-	-
(Angola)	Cambulo	–	-			7	-	-	-	-	-	-	-	-	-
(Angola)	David Dias	31	PF	1.99		14	-	-	-	-	-	-	-	-	2000
(Angola)	Garcia Domingos	–	PG	1.93		8	1992	1993	1994	1995	1996	1997	1998	1999	2000
(Angola)	Gaspar Neto		-			-	-	-	-	1995	-	-	-	-	-
(Angola)	Francisco Carlos Cungulo	24	SF			11	-	-	-	-	-	-	-	-	-
(Angola)	Herlander Coimbra	–	F	2.01		15	-	-	-	1995	-	-	-	-	2000
(Angola)	Ivo Alfredo	–	SF	1.91	92	-	-	-	-	-	-	-	1998	-	2000
(Angola)	Joaquim António Quinzinho		PG			-	-	-	-	1995	-	-	-	-	-
(Angola)	José Carlos Guimarães Zé Carlos	35	SG	1.90		-	-	-	-	-	-	-	-	1999	-
(Democratic Republic of the Congo)	Lifetu Selengue	–	C	2.02	90	-	-	-	-	-	-	-	-	-	2000
(Angola)	Luis Silva	–	-			6	-	-	-	-	-	-	-	-	-
(Angola)	Manuel Silva Pipas	–	-			10	-	-	-	1995	-	-	-	-	-
(Angola)	Manuel Sousa Necas	–	SG			9	-	-	-	-	-	-	-	-	-
(Angola)	Miguel Lutonda	–	PG	1.86	78	-	-	-	-	-	-	-	1998	1999	2000
(Angola)	Nelson Sardinha Futuro	33	C	2.00		-	-	-	-	-	-	-	-	1999	-
(Angola)	Papel	–	-			5	-	-	-	-	-	-	-	-	-
(Angola)	Paulo Macedo	27	PG			13	1992	1993	1994	1995	-	-	-	-	-
(Angola)	Rui Paulo		-			-	-	-	-	1995	-	-	-	-	-
(Angola)	Serqueira	–	-			4	-	-	-	-	-	-	-	-	-
(Angola)	Sílvio Lemos	22	PG	1.90		-	-	-	-	1995	-	-	-	-	2000
(Angola)	Simão Cunga Esquerdinho		PG			-	-	-	-	-	-	-	1998	-	2000
(Angola)	Tony Gaspar		PG			-	-	-	-	-	-	-	-	-	2000
(Angola)	Urbino Fonseca		-			-	-	-	-	1995	-	-	-	-	-
(Angola)	Victor Muzadi	–	C	2.01	102	-	-	-	-	1995	-	-	-	-	2000

== 1981–1990 ==
C.D. Primeiro de Agosto basketball players 1981–1990
# = Angola league winner

Nat	Name	A	P	H	W	Victorino Cunha									
Nat	Name	A	P	H	W	1981	1982	1983	1984	1985	1986	1987	1988	1989	1990
Nat	Name	A	P	H	W	–	–	–	–	–	–	–	–	–	–
(Angola)	Gustavo da Conceição	31	PF	1.92		1981	1982	1983	1984	1985	1986	1987	1988	-	-
(Angola)	Jean-Jacques	24	PF	1.98		-	1982	1983	1984	1985	1986	1987	1988	-	-

== See also ==
- List of C.D. Primeiro de Agosto women's basketball players
- List of C.D. Primeiro de Agosto (football) players
- List of Angola national basketball team players
