= 2005 FIBA Africa Clubs Champions Cup squads =

This article displays the rosters for the participating teams at the 2005 FIBA Africa Club Championship.

== (Ivory Coast) Abidjan Basket Club ==
Abidjan Basket Club – 2005 FIBA Africa Clubs Champions Cup – Gold medal roster
Players							Coaches
Pos	#	Nat	Name	Height	Weight	Age	Head coach
	4	(Ivory Coast)	Abou Fofana			20 November 1986 (aged 19)
	5	(Ivory Coast)	N'Dri Kouakou			13 April 1985 (aged 20)
	6	(Ivory Coast)	Morlaye Bangoura			18 February 1979 (aged 26)	Assistant coach(es)
	7	(Ivory Coast)	Jean Besse			16 January 1978 (aged 27)
	8	(Ivory Coast)	Aboud Bakayoko			18 July 1970 (aged 35)
	9	(Ivory Coast)	Eric Affi			1 January 1982 (aged 23)
	10	(Ivory Coast)	Kouamé Abo			26 October 1985 (aged 20)
	11	(Ivory Coast)	Aka Diamah			10 September 1984 (aged 21)
	12	(Ivory Coast)	Aristide Yao			14 May 1980 (aged 25)
	13	(Ivory Coast)	Blaise Amalabian			3 February 1974 (aged 31)
	14	(Ivory Coast)	Guy Touali			29 April 1974 (aged 31)
	15	(Ivory Coast)	Stéphane Konaté	1.93 m (6 ft 4 in)	80 kg (180 lb)	23 August 1980 (aged 25)

== (Guinea) BACK ==
BACK – 2005 FIBA Africa Clubs Champions Cup – 7th place roster
Players							Coaches
Pos	#	Nat	Name	Height	Weight	Age	Head coach
	4	(Guinea)	Moustapha Condé			1 November 1987 (aged 18)
	5	(Guinea)	Djibril Savane			10 November 1982 (aged 23)
	6	(Guinea)	Thierno Diallo			27 March 1979 (aged 26)	Assistant coach(es)
	7	(Guinea)	Amadou Bah			2 July 1985 (aged 20)
	8	(Guinea)	Sékou Condé			31 December 1986 (aged 18)
	9	(Guinea)	Kalagban Conde			22 December 1983 (aged 21)
	10	(Guinea)	Amara Keita			1 January 1987 (aged 18)
	11	(Guinea)	Saïba Kouyate			29 March 1986 (aged 19)
	12	(Guinea)	Abdoulaye Diop			25 August 1985 (aged 20)
	13	(Guinea)	N'Faly Camara			10 July 1986 (aged 19)
	14	(Guinea)	Aboubakar Sangare			25 January 1987 (aged 18)
	15	(Guinea)	Beka Mohamed			17 September 1987 (aged 18)

== (Republic of the Congo) Inter Club Brazzaville ==
Inter Club Brazzaville – 2005 FIBA Africa Clubs Champions Cup – 6th place roster
Players							Coaches
Pos	#	Nat	Name	Height	Weight	Age	Head coach
	4	(Republic of the Congo)	Rock Dengui			12 October 1972 (aged 33)
	5	(Republic of the Congo)	Bruno Nguia			21 March 1978 (aged 27)
	6	(Republic of the Congo)	Christian Boungou			20 August 1981 (aged 24)	Assistant coach(es)
	7	(Democratic Republic of the Congo)	Léonard Katanshi			29 June 1976 (aged 29)
	8	(Central African Republic)	Romaric Kondzy			12 December 1980 (aged 24)
	9	(Republic of the Congo)	Bertrand Ndonga			29 March 1978 (aged 27)
	10	(Republic of the Congo)	Ghislain Elenga			30 November 1979 (aged 26)
	11	(Republic of the Congo)	Max Kouguere			12 March 1987 (aged 18)
	12	(Republic of the Congo)	Yul Okho			21 April 1974 (aged 31)
	13	(Republic of the Congo)	Tanguy Ngombo	1.98 m (6 ft 6 in)	93 kg (205 lb)	18 July 1989 (aged 16)
	14	(Democratic Republic of the Congo)	Jim Kadima			17 August 1977 (aged 28)
	15	(Republic of the Congo)	Mvoula Mbany			7 April 1972 (aged 33)

== (Angola) Interclube ==
G.D. Interclube – 2005 FIBA Africa Clubs Champions Cup – Silver medal roster
Players							Coaches
Pos	#	Nat	Name	Height	Weight	Age	Head coach
	4	(Angola)	António Silva			4 April 1979 (aged 26)	(Angola) Manuel Sousa
	5	(Angola)	Hélder Domingos			31 October 1978 (aged 27)
	6	(Angola)	Geraldo Tondela			23 August 1977 (aged 28)	Assistant coach(es)
	7	(Angola)	Roly Mayombo			1 January 1978 (aged 27)
	8	(Angola)	Edmundo Ventura			4 March 1976 (aged 29)
	9	(Angola)	Michel dos Santos			15 April 1986 (aged 19)
	10	(Angola)	Manuel Martins "Massunga"			22 November 1973 (aged 32)
PG	11	(Angola)	Cristovão Suingui	1.86 m (6 ft 1 in)	81 kg (179 lb)	11 November 1976 (aged 29)
	12	(Angola)	Vicente Neto			8 August 1976 (aged 29)
	13	(Angola)	Fernando Albano			11 September 1975 (aged 30)
	15	(Senegal)	Mouhamadou Diop			29 April 1983 (aged 22)

== (Angola) Petro Atlético ==
Petro Atlético – 2005 FIBA Africa Clubs Champions Cup – 5th place roster
Players							Coaches
Pos	#	Nat	Name	Height	Weight	Age	Head coach
	4	(Angola)	Gerson Monteiro	1.90 m (6 ft 3 in)	90 kg (200 lb)	12 July 1973 (aged 32)	(Angola) Alberto de Carvalho
F	5	(Angola)	Luís Costa	1.94 m (6 ft 4 1/2 in)	93 kg (205 lb)	7 June 1978 (aged 27)
	6	(Angola)	Carlos Morais	1.93 m (6 ft 4 in)	91 kg (201 lb)	16 October 1985 (aged 20)	Assistant coach(es)
PF	7	(Angola)	Leonel Paulo	1.97 m (6 ft 5 1/2 in)	114 kg (251 lb)	30 April 1986 (aged 19)	(Angola) Victor de Carvalho
	8	(Angola)	António Cristo			29 October 1968 (aged 37)
	9	(Angola)	Helder Ortet			2 November 1982 (aged 23)
	10	(United States)	Shannon Crooks			11 December 1978 (aged 26)
	11	(Angola)	Jorge Tati	1.95 m (6 ft 5 in)		17 June 1983 (aged 22)
	12	(Angola)	Francisco Horácio			9 January 1980 (aged 25)
	13	(Angola)	Mílton Barros	1.83 m (6 ft 0 in)	75 kg (165 lb)	21 June 1984 (aged 21)
	14	(Portugal)	Francisco Jordão	2.00 m (6 ft 6 1/2 in)		30 December 1979 (aged 25)
	15	(Angola)	Víctor de Carvalho	1.93 m (6 ft 4 in)	89 kg (196 lb)	20 February 1969 (aged 36)

== (Angola) Primeiro de Agosto ==
Primeiro de Agosto – 2005 FIBA Africa Clubs Champions Cup – Bronze medal roster
Players							Coaches
Pos	#	Nat	Name	Height	Weight	Age	Head coach
	4	(Angola)	João Neto			19 December 1977 (aged 27)	(Portugal) Mário Palma
SF	5	(Angola)	Carlos Almeida	1.93 m (6 ft 4 in)	91 kg (201 lb)	24 September 1976 (aged 29)
PG	6	(Angola)	Armando Costa	1.92 m (6 ft 3 1/2 in)	91 kg (201 lb)	3 June 1983 (aged 22)
F	7	(Angola)	Olímpio Cipriano	1.94 m (6 ft 4 1/2 in)	93 kg (205 lb)	9 April 1982 (aged 23)
	8	(Angola)	Euclides Camacho			19 September 1980 (aged 25)
PF	9	(Angola)	Ângelo Victoriano	1.96 m (6 ft 5 in)	112 kg (247 lb)	8 February 1968 (aged 37)
PF	10	(Angola)	Vladimir Ricardino	2.03 m (6 ft 8 in)	93 kg (205 lb)	4 October 1978 (aged 27)
C	11	(Angola)	Victor Muzadi	2.01 m (6 ft 7 in)	102 kg (225 lb)	22 June 1978 (aged 27)
C	12	(Nigeria)	Obiora Nnaji	2.11 m (6 ft 11 in)	105 kg (231 lb)	21 October 1978 (aged 27)
PG	13	(Angola)	Walter Costa	1.85 m (6 ft 1 in)	82 kg (181 lb)	25 March 1973 (aged 32)
PG	14	(Angola)	Miguel Lutonda	1.86 m (6 ft 1 in)	78 kg (172 lb)	24 December 1971 (aged 33)
PF	15	(Angola) (Democratic Republic of the Congo)	Muamba Ilunga			4 August 1984 (aged 21)

== (Nigeria) Union Bank ==
Union Bank – 2005 FIBA Africa Clubs Champions Cup – 4th place roster
Players							Coaches
Pos	#	Nat	Name	Height	Weight	Age	Head coach
	4	(Nigeria)	Okoro Ifeanyi			31 December 1978 (aged 26)
	5	(Nigeria)	Aigbokhaode Daudu			13 January 1988 (aged 17)
	6	(Nigeria)	Ayokunle Oseibi			30 April 1980 (aged 25)	Assistant coach(es)
	7	(Nigeria)	Olugboyega Vidal			22 November 1974 (aged 31)
G	8	(Nigeria)	Adesola Alayande	1.83 m (6 ft 0 in)		25 May 1984 (aged 21)
	9	(Nigeria)	Kevin Ninmol			9 November 1985 (aged 20)
	10	(Nigeria)	Terungwa Gyang-Gyang			23 June 1979 (aged 26)
	11	(Nigeria)	Kingsley Omeonu			22 September 1975 (aged 30)
	12	(Nigeria)	Ibrahim Tat			25 March 1976 (aged 29)
F	13	(Nigeria)	Ejike Ugboaja	2.03 m (6 ft 8 in)		28 May 1985 (aged 20)
	14	(Nigeria)	Louis Ekpenyong			12 September 1983 (aged 22)
	15	(Nigeria)	Onieka Okeke			7 September 1988 (aged 17)
