= 2002 FIBA Africa Clubs Champions Cup squads =

This article displays the rosters for the participating teams at the 2002 FIBA Africa Club Championship.

== (Ivory Coast) Abidjan Basket Club ==
Abidjan Basket Club – 2002 FIBA Africa Clubs Champions Cup – 5th place roster
Players							Coaches
Pos	#	Nat	Name	Height	Weight	Age	Head Coach
G		(Ivory Coast)	Aboud Bakayoko	1.87 m (6 ft 1 1/2 in)		18 July 1970 (aged 32)	(Ivory Coast) Lemou Benga
		(Ivory Coast)	Morlaye Bangoura			18 February 1979 (aged 23)
		(Ivory Coast)	Vassy Banny	1.85 m (6 ft 1 in)	87 kg (192 lb)	8 September 1985 (aged 17)	Assistant coach(es)
G		(Ivory Coast)	Jean Marcel Besse	1.88 m (6 ft 2 in)		16 January 1978 (aged 24)
		(Ivory Coast)	Alain Diamah	1.95 m (6 ft 5 in)	88 kg (194 lb)	10 September 1984 (aged 18)
			Doradji Titidjo
		(Ivory Coast)	Jean-Michel Yable			18 January 1979 (aged 23)
		(Ivory Coast)	Jean-Philippe Kraidy			24 March 1978 (aged 24)
		(Democratic Republic of the Congo)	Engen Nurumbi	2.01 m (6 ft 7 in)		20 October 1983 (aged 19)
		(Nigeria)	Adamu Musa
G			Albert Oloubi
			Mohamed Tiene

== (Ivory Coast) Asec Mimosas ==
Asec Mimosas – 2002 FIBA Africa Clubs Champions Cup – Silver Medal roster
Players							Coaches
Pos	#	Nat	Name	Height	Weight	Age	Head Coach
G		(Ivory Coast)	Blaise Amalabian	1.87 m (6 ft 1 1/2 in)		3 February 1974 (aged 28)	Damo Malick
C		(Mali)	Ousmane Cisse	2.05 m (6 ft 8 1/2 in)	106 kg (234 lb)	20 October 1982 (aged 20)
			Khoviesson Couassi				Assistant coach(es)
C		(Ivory Coast)	Koné Kanvaly	2.03 m (6 ft 8 in)
			Koame Franel
			Martin Richard
F		(Ivory Coast)	Mamadou Savadogo	2.02 m (6 ft 7 1/2 in)		17 April 1978 (aged 24)
G		(Ivory Coast)	Soumaila Sissoko	1.85 m (6 ft 1 in)		27 February 1983 (aged 19)
F		(Ivory Coast)	Didier Eric Tape	1.98 m (6 ft 6 in)		25 October 1981 (aged 21)
G		(Ivory Coast)	Guy Serge Touali	1.82 m (5 ft 11 1/2 in)		29 April 1974 (aged 28)
F		(Ivory Coast)	Aristide Yao	1.90 m (6 ft 3 in)		14 May 1980 (aged 22)

== (Gabon) Capo Libreville ==
Capo Libreville – 2002 FIBA Africa Clubs Champions Cup – 4th place roster
Players							Coaches
Pos	#	Nat	Name	Height	Weight	Age	Head Coach
			Albane Hilaire				J. Cristophe Onyani
		(Gabon)	Marius Assoumou	1.96 m (6 ft 5 in)	95 kg (209 lb)	28 March 1984 (aged 18)
			Fabien Bissielou			31 August 1982 (aged 20)	Assistant coach(es)
		(Gabon)	Marcel Guende
F		(Gabon)	Stéphane Lasme	2.03 m (6 ft 8 in)	98 kg (216 lb)	17 December 1982 (aged 19)
		(Gabon)	Makita Pacome	1.95 m (6 ft 5 in)
			Gildas Manianga
		(Gabon)	Marvin Minkoe			13 May 1980 (aged 22)
		(Gabon)	Serbe Nollet			9 February 1980 (aged 22)
			Robert Ndong			11 April 1982 (aged 20)
			Jonas Niares
			Walker Anguilet

== (Republic of the Congo) Inter Club Brazzaville ==
Inter Club Brazzaville – 2002 FIBA Africa Clubs Champions Cup – Bronze medal roster
Players							Coaches
Pos	#	Nat	Name	Height	Weight	Age	Head Coach
G			Assoua Valente				Reni Ngonongo
F			Rock Backat
C			Ebayi Aubin				Assistant coach(es)
		(Republic of the Congo)	Ghislain Elenga			30 November 1979 (aged 23)
		(Republic of the Congo)	Hermann Essandzabeka			15 December 1976 (aged 25)
		(Democratic Republic of the Congo)	Leonard Katanshi
		(Republic of the Congo)	Yul Okho			21 April 1974 (aged 28)
			Mvoula Mbany			7 April 1972 (aged 30)
			Bertrand Ndonga
		(Republic of the Congo)	Bruno Nguia			21 March 1978 (aged 24)
		(Central African Republic)	Romaric Kondzy			12 December 1980 (aged 21)
		(Democratic Republic of the Congo)	Jim Kadima			17 August 1977 (aged 25)

== Kenya Ports Authority ==
Kenya Ports Authority – 2002 FIBA Africa Clubs Champions Cup – 7th place roster
Players							Coaches
Pos	#	Nat	Name	Height	Weight	Age	Head Coach
		(Kenya)	Dennis Opiyo	1.98 m (6 ft 6 in)			(Kenya) Sammy Wanjohi
		(Kenya)	Emmanuel Omondi	1.96 m (6 ft 5 in)
G		(Kenya)	Emmanuel Sibuku	1.73 m (5 ft 8 in)			Assistant coach(es)
G		(Kenya)	Francis Odari	1.88 m (6 ft 2 in)
		(Kenya)	Geoffrey Omondi	1.96 m (6 ft 5 in)
		(Kenya)	George Omondi
G		(Kenya)	Joshua Wanyama	1.78 m (5 ft 10 in)
F		(Kenya)	Kennedy Omollo	1.98 m (6 ft 6 in)
		(Kenya)	Anthony Ojukwu
		(Kenya)	Kenneth Omundi
G		(Kenya)	Tony Owino	1.88 m (6 ft 2 in)
		(Kenya)	Sammy Chone

== (Angola) Primeiro de Agosto ==
Primeiro de Agosto – 2002 FIBA Africa Clubs Champions Cup – Gold Medal roster
Players							Coaches
Pos	#	Nat	Name	Height	Weight	Age	Head Coach
F	4	(Angola)	Afonso Silva	1.91 m (6 ft 3 in)	92 kg (203 lb)	24 July 1974 (aged 28)	(Portugal) Mário Palma
F	5	(Angola)	Carlos Almeida	1.93 m (6 ft 4 in)	91 kg (201 lb)	24 September 1976 (aged 26)
G	6	(Angola)	Garcia Domingos	1.87 m (6 ft 1 1/2 in)	96 kg (212 lb)	12 May 1971 (aged 31)	Assistant coach(es)
F	7	(Angola)	Olímpio Cipriano	1.93 m (6 ft 4 in)	93 kg (205 lb)	9 April 1982 (aged 20)
F	8	(Angola)	Edmar Victoriano	1.95 m (6 ft 5 in)	88 kg (194 lb)	10 November 1975 (aged 27)
F	9	(Angola)	Ângelo Victoriano	1.96 m (6 ft 5 in)	112 kg (247 lb)	8 February 1968 (aged 34)
C	10	(Democratic Republic of the Congo)	Lifetu Selengue	2.02 m (6 ft 7 1/2 in)	90 kg (200 lb)	27 December 1976 (aged 25)
C	11	(Angola) (Gabon)	Victor Muzadi	2.01 m (6 ft 7 in)	102 kg (225 lb)	22 June 1978 (aged 24)
C	12	(Angola) (Chad)	Abdel Bouckar	2.04 m (6 ft 8 1/2 in)	109 kg (240 lb)	8 April 1980 (aged 22)
G	13	(Angola)	Walter Costa	1.85 m (6 ft 1 in)	82 kg (181 lb)	25 March 1973 (aged 29)
G	14	(Angola)	Miguel Lutonda	1.86 m (6 ft 1 in)	78 kg (172 lb)	24 December 1971 (aged 30)
C	15	(Angola) (Democratic Republic of the Congo)	Buila Katiavala	2.06 m (6 ft 9 in)	102 kg (225 lb)	13 May 1976 (aged 26)

== (Mali) Stade Malien ==
Stade Malien – 2002 FIBA Africa Clubs Champions Cup – 6th place roster
Players							Coaches
Pos	#	Nat	Name	Height	Weight	Age	Head Coach
			Alpha Kone				Sekou Tamboura
			Amadou Bamboa
			Birama Kone				Assistant coach(es)
			Boubacar Kanoute
			Cheick Diakite
			Dumar Traore
			Hamidou Traore
			Kaba Kone
		(Mali)	Mohamed Tangara			11 August 1984 (aged 18)
			Modibo Keita
			Sanoussi Touré
			Birama Kanoute

== See also ==
2001 FIBA Africa Women's Clubs Champions Cup squads
