= 1986 FIBA World Championship squads =

Basketball tournament groupings

The 1986 FIBA World Championship squads were the squads of the 1986 FIBA World Championship, which was held in Spain, between 5 and 20 July 1986. Each one of the 24 teams at the tournament selected a squad of 12 players, for a total of 288 players.

== Group A ==
Brazil

- Nilo Guimarães
- Maury Ponickwar
- Gerson Victalino
- João José Vianna
- Rolando Ferreira
- Paulinho Villas Boas
- Jorge Guerra
- Marcel Ponickwar
- Marcelo Vido
- Silvio Malvesi
- Oscar Schmidt
- Israel Andrade

France

- Richard Dacoury
- Stéphane Ostrowski
- Hervé Dubuisson
- Frederic Hufnagel
- Valéry Demory
- Jacques Monclar
- Jean-Luc Deganis
- Eric Beugnot
- Georges Vestris
- Patrick Cham
- Christian Garnier
- Daniel Haquet
- (Coach: Jean Galle)

Greece

- Nikos Galis
- Panagiotis Giannakis
- Fanis Christodoulou
- Michalis Romanidis
- Nikos Filippou
- Liveris Andritsos
- Nikos Stavropoulos
- Argiris Kambouris
- Argyris Pedoulakis
- Panagiotis Karatzas
- Dimitris Dimakopoulos
- Christos Christodoulou
- (Coach: Kostas Politis)

South Korea

- Hur Jae
- Park In-kyu
- Lee Min-hyun
- Cho Yoon-ho
- Han Ki-bum
- Lee Mun-kyu
- Kim Hyun-jun
- Kim You-taek
- Kim Sung-wook
- Lee Won-woo
- Lee Chung-hee
- Goh Myong-hwa
- (Coach: Kim In-kun)

Panama

- Ernesto Malcolm
- Mario Butler
- Rolando Frazer
- Reggie Grenald
- Rodolfo Gill
- Fernando Pinillo
- Braulio Rivas
- Adolfo Medrick
- Cirilo Escalona
- Mario Gálvez
- Enrique Grenald
- Daniel Macias
- (Coach: Frank Holness)

Spain

Spain national basketball team – 1986 FIBA Basketball World Cup roster
Players
Coaches

Pos.	No.	Name	Age – Date of birth	Height	Club	Ctr.
SG	4	Jordi Villacampa	22 – October 11, 1963	1.96 m (6 ft 5 in)	Joventut Badalona	(Spain)
PG	5	Quim Costa	28 – October 30, 1957	1.84 m (6 ft 0 in)	FC Barcelona	(Spain)
SF	6	Cándido Sibilio	27 – October 3, 1958	2.00 m (6 ft 7 in)	FC Barcelona	(Spain)
SF	7	Josep Maria Margall	31 – March 17, 1955	1.98 m (6 ft 6 in)	Joventut Badalona	(Spain)
PF	8	Andrés Jiménez	24 – June 6, 1962	2.05 m (6 ft 9 in)	FC Barcelona	(Spain)
C	9	Fernando Romay	26 – July 23, 1959	2.13 m (7 ft 0 in)	Real Madrid	(Spain)
C	10	Fernando Martín Espina	24 – March 25, 1962	2.06 m (6 ft 9 in)	Real Madrid	(Spain)
F	11	Fernando Arcega	26 – July 3, 1960	2.03 m (6 ft 8 in)	CB Zaragoza	(Spain)
PG	12	Ignacio Solozábal	28 – January 8, 1958	1.85 m (6 ft 1 in)	FC Barcelona	(Spain)
C	13	Juan de la Cruz	32 – February 6, 1954	2.06 m (6 ft 9 in)	FC Barcelona	(Spain)
PG	14	Joan Creus	29 – November 24, 1956	1.75 m (5 ft 9 in)	Granollers	(Spain)
SF	15	Juan Antonio San Epifanio	27 – June 12, 1959	2.01 m (6 ft 7 in)	FC Barcelona	(Spain)

Head coach

- (Spain) Antonio Díaz-Miguel

Legend

- (C) Team captain
- Club – describes last
  club before the tournament
- Age – describes age
  on 5 July 1986

== Group B ==
Angola

- Jean-Jacques
- David Dias
- Manuel Sousa
- Aníbal Moreira
- Adriano Baião
- Josué Campos
- José Carlos Guimaraes
- Zezé Assis
- Ademar Barros
- Paulo Macedo
- Coach: Victorino Cunha

Australia

Australia national basketball team – 1986 FIBA Basketball World Cup roster
Players
Coaches

Pos.	No.	Name	Age – Date of birth	Height	Club	Ctr.
G	4	Cal Bruton	31 – September 29, 1954	1.88 m (6 ft 2 in)	Brisbane Bullets	(Australia)
SG	5	Darryl Pearce	25 – October 15, 1960	1.91 m (6 ft 3 in)	Adelaide 36ers	(Australia)
PG	6	Phil Smyth	28 – May 11, 1958	1.83 m (6 ft 0 in)	Canberra Cannons	(Australia)
PF	7	Larry Sengstock	26 – March 4, 1960	1.98 m (6 ft 6 in)	Brisbane Bullets	(Australia)
SF	8	Mark Dalton	21 – November 9, 1964	1.98 m (6 ft 6 in)	Geelong Cats	(Australia)
F	9	Wayne Carroll	27 – February 16, 1959	1.96 m (6 ft 5 in)	Coburg Giants	(Australia)
C	10	Paul Kuiper	23 – February 8, 1963	2.10 m (6 ft 11 in)	St. Kilda Saints	(Australia)
SG	11	Andrew Gaze	20 – July 24, 1965	2.01 m (6 ft 7 in)	Melbourne Tigers	(Australia)
F	12	Ian Davies	30 – January 29, 1956	1.98 m (6 ft 6 in)	Geelong Cats	(Australia)
PF	13	Simon Cottrell	23 – June 18, 1963	2.03 m (6 ft 8 in)	Canberra Cannons	(Australia)
C	14	Brad Dalton	26 – September 12, 1959	2.03 m (6 ft 8 in)	Geelong Cats	(Australia)
C	15	Ray Borner	24 – May 27, 1962	2.08 m (6 ft 10 in)	Coburg Giants	(Australia)

Head coach

- (Australia) Adrian Hurley

Legend

- (C) Team captain
- Club – describes last
  club before the tournament
- Age – describes age
  on 5 July 1986

Cuba

- Daniel Scott
- Félix Morales
- Raúl Dubois
- Pedro Abreu
- Luis Calderón
- Noangel Luaces
- Eduardo Cabrera
- Luciano Rivero
- Roberto Simón Salomón
- Leonardo Pérez
- José Carlos Caballero
- Pedro Cobarrubia
- (Coach: Juan Carmelo Ortega Díaz)

Israel

- Doron Jamchi
- Mickey Berkowitz
- Adi Gordon
- Tomer Steinhauer
- Howard Lassoff
- Hen Lippin
- Motti Daniel
- Nir Rechlis
- Ari Rosenberg
- Doron Shefa
- Larry Bird-Curtis
- Ofer Yaakobi
- (Coach: Zvi Sherf)

Soviet Union

- Arvydas Sabonis
- Valdis Valters
- Alexander Volkov
- Vladimir Tkachenko
- Tiit Sokk
- Alexander Belostenny
- Rimas Kurtinaitis
- Valdemaras Chomičius
- Sergei Tarakanov
- Valeri Tikhonenko
- Sergei Grishaev
- Andris Jekabsons
- (Coach: Vladimir Obukhov)

Uruguay

- Horacio López
- Ramiro Cortés
- Álvaro Tito
- Joe McCall
- Juan Mignone
- Horacio Perdomo
- Gabriel Waiter
- Luis Larrosa
- Luis Pierri
- Carlos Peinado
- Hebert Núñez
- Gustavo Sczygielski
- (Coach: Ramón Etchamendi)

== Group C ==
China

Ivory Coast

Italy

- Antonello Riva
- Walter Magnifico
- Roberto Brunamonti
- Pierlo Marzorati
- Roberto Premier
- Ario Costa
- Renato Villalta
- Augusto Binelli
- Romeo Sacchetti
- Sandro dell'Agnello
- Enrico Gilardi
- Fulvio Polesello
- (Coach: Valerio Bianchini)

Puerto Rico

- Federico Lopez
- Ramón Rivas
- Jerome Mincy
- Angelo Cruz
- Felix Rivera
- Edgar de Leon
- Wesley Correa
- Jose Sosa
- Orlando Febres
- Frankie Torruellas
- Mario Morales
- Francisco de Leon (Coach: Angel Cancel)

United States

- 4. Muggsy Bogues
- 5. Tommy Amaker
- 6. Steve Kerr
- 7. Kenny Smith
- 8. Sean Elliott
- 9. Derrick McKey
- 10. Rony Seikaly
- 11. David Robinson
- 12. Tom Hammonds
- 13. Brian Shaw
- 14. Armen Gilliam
- 15. Charles Smith
- (Coach: Lute Olson)

West Germany

- Gunther Behnke
- Chris Welp
- Michael Koch
- Hansi Gnad
- Ralf Risse
- Armin Andres
- Jan Villwock
- Rainer Greunke
- Holger Arpe
- Armin Sowa
- Lutz Wadehn
- Burkhard Schröder
- (Coach: Ralph Klein)

== Group D ==
Argentina

- 4. Esteban Camisassa
- 5. Héctor Campana
- 6. Diego Maggi
- 7. Hernán Montenegro
- 8. Carlos Romano
- 9. Marcelo Milanesio
- 10. Sergio Aispurúa
- 11. Miguel Cortijo
- 12. Sebastián Uranga
- 13. Gabriel Milovich
- 14. Luis Oroño
- 15. Fernando Borcel
- (Coach: Flor Meléndez)

Canada

- Gerry Besselink
- John Hatch
- Gordon Herbert
- Gerald Kazanowski
- Howard Kelsey
- Barry Mungar
- Dan Meagher
- Eli Pasquale
- Tony Simms
- Jay Triano
- David Turcotte
- Greg Wiltjer
- (Coach: Jack Donahue)

Malaysia

Netherlands

- Rik Smits
- Jelle Esveldt
- Ronald Schilp
- Cock van de Lagemaat
- Raymond Bottse
- Rene Ebeltjes
- Chris van Dinten
- Hans Heijdeman
- Erik Griekspoor
- Emill Hagens
- Marco de Waard
- Peter van Noord
- (Coach: Ruud Harrewijn)

New Zealand

- Gilbert Gordon
- Peter Pokai
- Stan Hill
- Neil Stephens
- Dave Edmonds
- Ian Webb
- Dave Mason
- Tony Smith
- Colin Crampton
- Frank Mulvihill
- Glen Denham
- John Rademakers
- (Coach: Robert Bishop)

Yugoslavia

Yugoslavia men's national basketball team roster
Players
Coaches

Pos.	No.	Name	Age – Date of birth	Height	Club
SG	4	Dražen Petrović	21 – 22 October 1964	1.96 m (6 ft 5 in)	Cibona	(Socialist Federal Republic of Yugoslavia)
PG	5	Aleksandar Petrović	27 – 16 February 1959	1.94 m (6 ft 4 in)	Cibona	(Socialist Federal Republic of Yugoslavia)
C	6	Vlade Divac	18 – 3 February 1968	2.16 m (7 ft 1 in)	KK Partizan	(Socialist Federal Republic of Yugoslavia)
SF	7	Zoran Čutura	24 – 13 March 1962	2.02 m (6 ft 8 in)	Cibona	(Socialist Federal Republic of Yugoslavia)
F	8	Veljko Petranović	26 – 24 August 1959	2.04 m (6 ft 8 in)	Zadar	(Socialist Federal Republic of Yugoslavia)
SF	9	Emir Mutapčić	26 – 26 May 1960	1.98 m (6 ft 6 in)	Bosna	(Socialist Federal Republic of Yugoslavia)
PG	10	Zoran Radović	25 – 17 February 1961	1.91 m (6 ft 3 in)	Crvena zvezda	(Socialist Federal Republic of Yugoslavia)
C	11	Stojko Vranković	22 – 22 January 1964	2.18 m (7 ft 2 in)	Zadar	(Socialist Federal Republic of Yugoslavia)
C	12	Ratko Radovanović	29 – 16 October 1956	2.08 m (6 ft 10 in)	Stade Français	(France)
C	13	Franjo Arapović	23 – 2 June 1965	2.15 m (7 ft 1 in)	Cibona	(Socialist Federal Republic of Yugoslavia)
SF	14	Dražen Dalipagić	34 – 27 November 1951	2.02 m (6 ft 8 in)	Giomo Venezia	(Italy)
F	15	Danko Cvjetićanin	22 – 16 October 1963	1.98 m (6 ft 6 in)	Cibona	(Socialist Federal Republic of Yugoslavia)

Head coach

- (Socialist Federal Republic of Yugoslavia) Krešimir Ćosić

Assistant coach(es)

- (Socialist Federal Republic of Yugoslavia) Dušan Ivković

Legend

- Club – describes last
  club before the tournament
- Age – describes age
  on 5 July 1986
