= Zezé Assis =

Angolan basketball player

Personal information
- Born: 1 February 1962 Luanda, Angola
- Died: 19 August 2007 (aged 45) Luanda, Angola
- Position: Small forward

Career history
- Leões de Luanda
Medals
Men's basketball
Representing Angola
FIBA Africa Championship
Gold medal – first place	Luanda 1989	Angola
Silver medal – second place	Abidjan 1985	Angola
Bronze medal – third place	Tunis 1987	Angola

José Assis (1 February 1962 – 19 August 2007), best known as Zezé Assis, was an Angolan basketball player. Assis, a small forward, competed for Angola at the 1981, 1985, 1987 and 1989 AfroBaskets as well as at the 1986 FIBA World Championship.

At the club level, he played for Leões de Luanda, alongside Angolan basketball giant José Carlos Guimarães, having won two national championships, in 1982 and 1984. The club's name later reverted to its original Sporting Clube de Luanda.

On 19 August 2007 Assis died of a long disease, at the age of 45 in Luanda.

== See also ==
- Angolan Basketball Federation
- List of Angola basketball squads
