= Ivo Alfredo =

Angolan basketball player

Personal information
- Born: May 29, 1968 (age 58) Matala, Angola
- Listed height: 205 cm (6 ft 9 in)
- Listed weight: 130 kg (287 lb)
- Position: Center

Career history
- Primeiro de Agosto

Ivo Jesus António e Alfredo (born May 29, 1968, in Matala) is a retired Angolan basketball player. A 6’7”, 290-pound Center, he played on Angola's 1990 FIBA World Championship and 1994 FIBA World Championship teams while winning two African titles in 1989 and 1992.
