= Alberto Carvalho =

Alberto Carvalho may refer to:

- Alberto M. Carvalho, Portuguese-American educator and school superintendent
- Alberto de Carvalho, Angolan-Portuguese al basketball coach
