= Honorato =

Honorato is both a given name and a surname. Notable people with the name include:

- Honorato Hernández (born 1956), Spanish long-distance runner
- Honorato Trosso (born 1970), Angolan basketball player
- Carlos Honorato (born 1974), Brazilian judoka
