= Nelson Sardinha =

Angolan basketball player

Personal information
- Born: June 28, 1966 (age 60) Luanda, Angola
- Listed height: 201 cm (6.59 ft)
- Listed weight: 95 kg (209 lb)
- Position: Center

Career history
- 1999: 1º de Agosto

Nelson Timóteo Alves Sardinha (born June 28, 1966, in Luanda) is a retired Angolan basketball player. A 6’6”, 209-pound Center, he competed for Angola at the 1990 FIBA World Championship and 1992 Olympic Games, while winning two African titles in 1989 and 1992.
