= Honorato Trosso =

Angolan basketball player (born 1970)

Personal information
- Born: January 27, 1970 (age 56) Luanda, Angola
- Listed height: 190 cm (6.2 ft)
- Listed weight: 88 kg (194 lb)
- Position: Small forward

Career history
- Petro Atlético

Honorato Trosso (born January 27, 1970, in Luanda) is a former Angolan basketball player. Trosso, a 6 ft 6in / 190 lb Small forward, played for Angola at the 1994 World Championship and 1996 Summer Olympics.

== See also ==
- Angola national basketball team
