= Mário Belarmino =

Angolan basketball player (born 1974)

Personal information
- Born: 22 September 1974 (age 52) Lubango, Angola
- Listed height: 196 cm (6.43 ft)
- Listed weight: 93 kg (205 lb)
- Position: Small forward

Career history
- Petro Atlético

Belarmino Mário Chipongue (born 22 September 1974 in Lubango) is a former Angolan basketball player.

Chipongue, a forward, was part of the Angola national basketball team at the 2000 Summer Olympics and the 2002 FIBA World Championship.

== See also ==
- Angola national basketball team
