= Simão Santos =

Angolan basketball player

Personal information
- Born: July 21, 1982 (age 44) Luanda, Angola
- Listed height: 198 cm (6.50 ft)
- Listed weight: 0 kg (0 lb)
- Position: Small forward / power forward

Career history
- BC Barcelos
- SC Marinhense
- 2003–2006: Ovarense
- Póvoa Vierominho
- 2006: Interclube
- 2010: ASA
- 2011: Recreativo do Libolo

Simão Víctor Santos (born 21 July 1982 in Luanda, Angola), is a professional Angolan basketball player. Santos, who is 198 cm (6 ft 6 in) in height and weighs 91 kg (201 lb), plays as a small forward. He competed for Angola at the 2011 FIBA Africa Championship.

At the end of the 2011 Afrobasket semi-final match in which Angola beat Cameroon 84–83 in overtime, a highly emotional Santos fainted and had to be taken away for medical attention.
