= Anthony Ojukwu =

Nigerian lawyer and activist

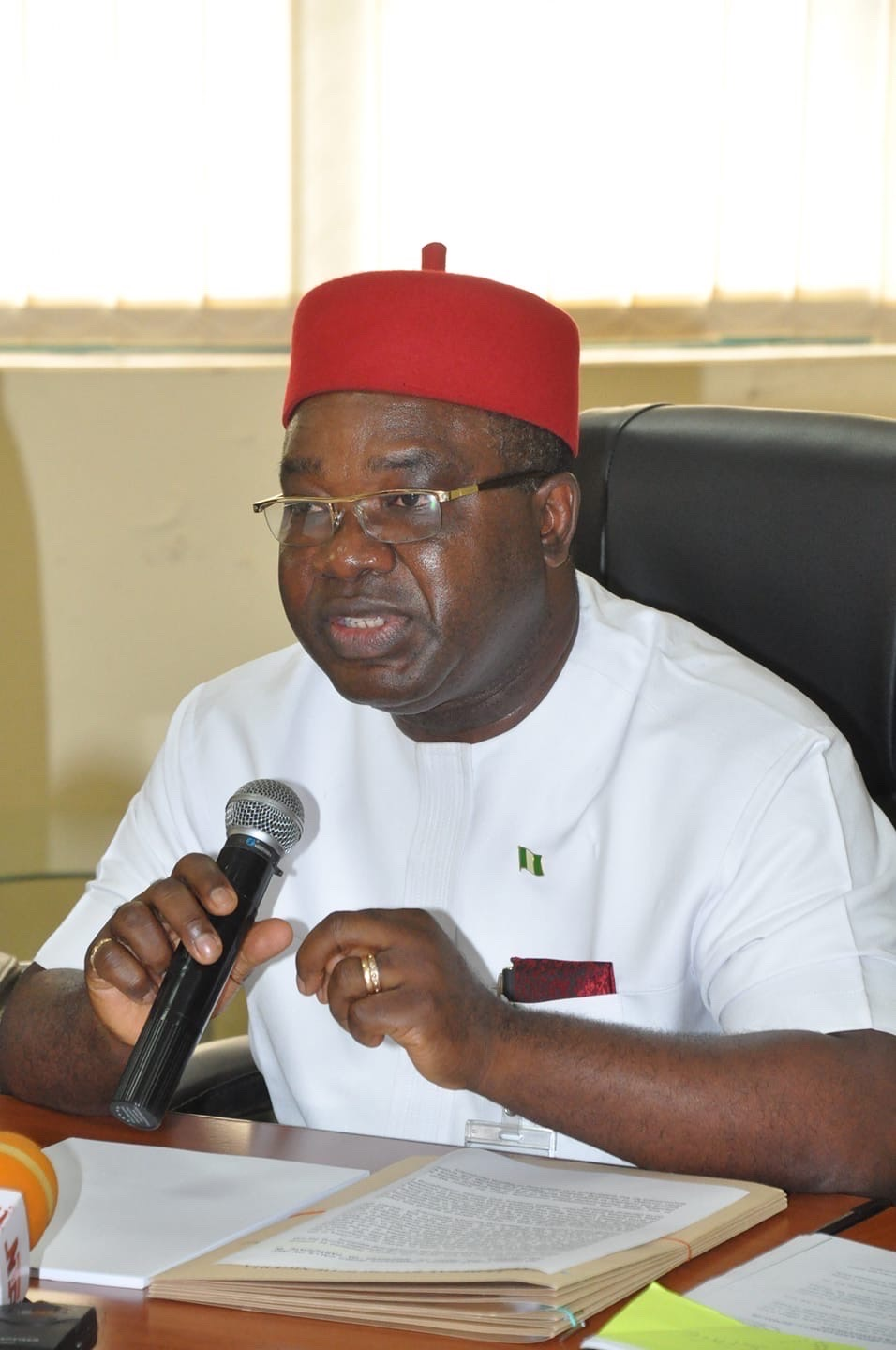
- Ojukwu in 2023

Executive Secretary National Human Rights Commission
- Incumbent
- Assumed office 2022

Personal details
- Born: Imo State, Nigeria
- Education: University of Nigeria, University of Lagos

Anthony Okechukwu Ojukwu is a Nigerian Lawyer and the Executive Secretary of the National Human Rights Commission of Nigeria, an independent national institution for the promotion, protection and enforcement of human rights in Nigeria. In 2021, he was named a Senior Advocate of Nigeria (SAN)

== Education ==
Ojukwu obtained his bachelor's degree (LLB) in Law at the Enugu Campus of the University of Nigeria. In 1998, he completed his master's degree (LLM) in Law at the University of Lagos, Akoka. Ojukwu also completed an international Human Rights Training Program (IHRTP) Equitas in Canada in 2007.

== Career ==
Anthony Okechukwu Ojukwu was appointed the State Administrative Secretary/CEO of the National Electoral Commission (NEC) in Imo State. In 2001, he was appointed as the Special Assistant to the former Executive Secretary of the National Human Rights Commission, Dr Bukhari Bello, mni, MFR. Ojukwu was later nominated and appointed as the Executive Secretary of the National Human Rights Commission by President Muhammadu Buhari in December, 2021.
