= Paulo Macedo (basketball) =

Angolan professional basketball player and coach

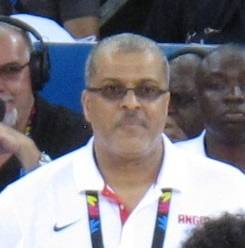
- Macedo in 2014

Personal information
- Born: 28 May 1968 (age 58) Luanda, Angola
- Listed height: 190 cm (6.2 ft)
- Listed weight: 92 kg (203 lb)

Career information
- Playing career: 1979–1995
- Position: Point guard
- Coaching career: 2012–present

Career history

Playing
- –: 1º de Agosto
- –: Sporting Portugal
- –: 1º de Agosto

Coaching
- 2012–2015: 1º de Agosto
- 2013: Angola National Team
- 2015–2016: Marinha de Guerra
- 2017–2020: 1º de Agosto

Career highlights
- As head coach: 3× FIBA Africa Basketball League champion (2012, 2013, 2019)
Medals
Men's basketball
Representing Angola
AfroBasket
Gold medal – first place	Luanda 1989	National Team
Gold medal – first place	Cairo 1992	National Team
Gold medal – first place	Nairobi 1993	National Team
Gold medal – first place	Abidjan 2013	National Team
Silver medal – second place	Radès 2015	National Team
Bronze medal – third place	Tunis 1987	National Team
FIBA Africa Under-18 Championship
Silver medal – second place	Abuja 1987	National Team
FIBA Africa Clubs Champions Cup
Gold medal – first place	Malabo 2012	1º de Agosto
Gold medal – first place	Sousse 2013	1º de Agosto

Paulo Jorge Morais Rebelo de Macedo (born 28 May 1968) is an Angolan former professional basketball player and a current coach. Macedo, who is 190 cm (6 ft 3 in) in height, has been a prominent point guard both at the service of the Angola national basketball team and with Primeiro de Agosto. For Angola, he played at the 1986, 1990 and 1994 world championships as well as at the 1992 Summer Olympics. Moreover, he won the FIBA Africa championships in 1989, 1992, 1993 and in 2013 as a coach.

On 30 May 2012 he was appointed head coach of the Angola national basketball team for the 2013 AfroBasket.

In January 2016, he was appointed head coach of Clube Desportivo da Marinha de Guerra.

As of June 2017, he has been the head coach of Clube Desportivo Primeiro de Agosto.

== Awards and accomplishments ==
=== Coaching career ===
Primeiro de Agosto

- 3× FIBA Africa Basketball League: (2012, 2013, 2019)
- 2× Angolan Basketball League: (2013, 2018)
- 2× Supertaça de Angola: (2013, 2014)

== See also ==
- List of FIBA AfroBasket winning head coaches
