= Garcia Domingos =

Angolan basketball player

Personal information
- Born: May 12, 1971 (age 55) Luanda, Angola
- Listed height: 187 cm (6.14 ft)
- Listed weight: 96 kg (212 lb)
- Position: Point guard
Medals
Men's basketball
Representing Angola
AfroBasket
| Bronze medal – third place | Dakar 1997 | National Team |
Clubs Champions Cup
| Gold medal – first place | Luanda 2002 | 1º de Agosto |

Garcia João dos Santos Domingos (born 12 May 1971 in Luanda) is a former Angolan basketball player. He competed at the 2000 Summer Olympics with the Angola national basketball team.
