= Alberto de Carvalho =

Angolan basketball coach (born 1956)

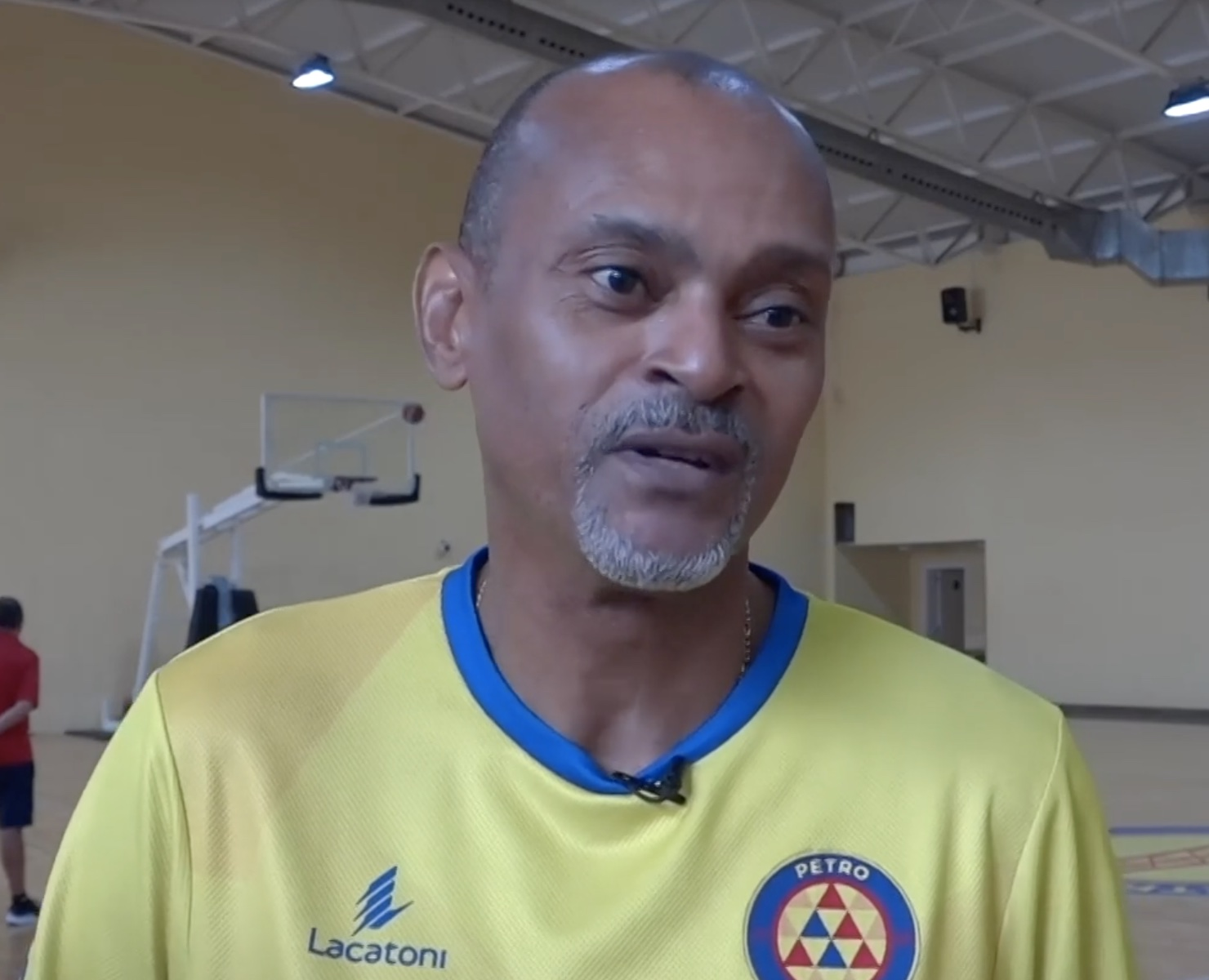
- De Carvalho during an interview in 2022

Personal information
- Born: 18 August 1956 (age 70) Luanda, Angola
- Coaching career: 2001–present

Career history

Coaching
- 2001–2005: Lusitânia
- 2005–2009: Petro de Luanda
- 2010–2012: Sporting Cabinda
- 2012–2013: Interclube
- 2016: Progresso

Alberto de Carvalho, nicknamed Ginguba (born 18 August 1956), is an Angolan-Portuguese professional basketball coach. He is a former coach of the Angola national basketball team.

Before moving to Angola where he won two straight national championships with Petro Atlético in 2006 and 2007, he coached Lusitânia of Portugal.

In 2006, he was chosen to replace Mário Palma as the Angola coach for the 2006 FIBA World Championship finals. He won the 2007 FIBA Africa Championship and was his country coach for the 2008 Olympic Games tournament in Beijing.

In August 2016, Ginguba was appointed head-coach of Progresso do Sambizanga

== See also ==
- List of FIBA AfroBasket winning head coaches
