= Edmar Victoriano =

Angolan basketball player (born 1975)

Personal information
- Born: 10 November 1975 (age 51) Luanda, Angola
- Listed height: 195 cm (6.40 ft)
- Listed weight: 88 kg (194 lb)
- Position: Power forward

Career history
- ?–2001: Petro Atlético
- 2001–2004: Primeiro de Agosto
- 2004–2006: Petro Atlético
Medals
Men's basketball
Representing Angola
AfroBasket
Gold medal – first place	Algiers 1995	Angola
Gold medal – first place	Luanda 1999	Angola
Gold medal – first place	Casablanca 2001	Angola
Gold medal – first place	Alexandria 2003	Angola
Bronze medal – third place	Dakar 1997	Angola
FIBA Africa Clubs Champions Cup
Gold medal – first place	Luanda 2002	1º de Agosto
Gold medal – first place	Cairo 2004	1º de Agosto

Edmar Monteiro dos Santos Victoriano a.k.a. "Baduna", (born 10 November 1975 in Luanda) is a former Angolan professional basketball player with Petro Atlético and Primeiro de Agosto. A former player of the Angolan national basketball team, he competed for Angola at the 1996, 2000 and 2004 Summer Olympics as well as the 2002 World Championships.

His career was cut short in 2006 due to injury.

== Facts ==
- Victoriano was born the day before Angola's official independence on 11 November 1975.
- Edmar's older brother, Ângelo Victoriano and younger brother Puna Victoriano have also been remarkable Angolan basketball players.
