= Angola men's national basketball team =

Mem's national basketball team for Angola

Angola
- FIBA ranking: 32 (13 July 2026)
- Joined FIBA: 1979
- FIBA zone: FIBA Africa
- National federation: FAB Portuguese: Federação Angolana de Basquetebol
- Coach: Josep Clarós

Olympic Games
- Appearances: 5

FIBA World Cup
- Appearances: 9

AfroBasket
- Appearances: 22
- Medals: (gold) Gold: (1989, 1992, 1993, 1995, 1999, 2001, 2003, 2005, 2007, 2009, 2013, 2025); (silver) Silver: (1983, 1985, 2011, 2015); (bronze) Bronze: (1987, 1997)
Home	Away

The Angolan men's national basketball team is controlled by the Federação Angolana de Basquetebol. Angola has been a member of FIBA since 1979. Ranking 23rd in the FIBA World Rankings, Angola is the top team of FIBA Africa, and a regular competitor at the Summer Olympic Games and the FIBA World Cup.

== History ==
Angola made its first official match against Nigeria, under coach Victorino Cunha on 1 February 1976, having lost 62–71.

== International competitions ==
Angola has competed in many international competitions, including the 1992 Summer Olympics, 1996 Summer Olympics, 2000 Summer Olympics, 2002 World Championship, 2004 Summer Olympics, the 2006 World Championship, the 2010 World Championship, and the 2014 Basketball World Cup as well as the FIBA Africa Championship, where the team has won 11 of the last 16 championships, with the first coming in 1989, and the most recent in 2013. In addition, they won the tournament at the 1987 All-Africa Games, 2003 All-Africa Games and 2007 All-Africa Games.

=== 2006 FIBA World Championship ===
Angola competed at the 2006 World Championship in Group B, alongside Germany, Japan, New Zealand, Panama, and Spain. In group play, they finished with 3 wins (versus Panama, New Zealand, and Japan), and 2 losses (versus Spain and Germany). They lost in the knockout stage to France, for a total record of 3 wins and 3 losses, good for 10th place overall, ahead of traditional basketball powerhouse Serbia and Montenegro.

=== 2014 FIBA World Championship ===
Angola qualified for the event through winning the AfroBasket 2013, its 11th title in 13 consecutive African Championship Tournaments. At the 2014 FIBA World Cup, Angola was especially noteworthy for its rebounds and steals. In both categories, the African Champion was among the top-5 at the World Cup.

== Tournament record ==
=== Olympic Games ===
Year	Round	Position	GP	W	L	GS	GA	GD
(Soviet Union) Moscow 1980	Did not qualify							
(United States) Los Angeles 1984	Did not qualify							
(South Korea) Seoul 1988	Did not qualify							
(Spain) Barcelona 1992		10th	7	2	5	478	539	−61
(United States) Atlanta 1996		11th	7	2	5	446	516	−70
(Australia) Sydney 2000		12th	6	0	6	363	480	−117
(Greece) Athens 2004		12th	6	0	6	380	504	−124
(China) Beijing 2008		12th	5	0	5	321	477	−156
(United Kingdom) London 2012	Did not qualify							
(Brazil) Rio 2016	Did not qualify							
(Japan) Tokyo 2020	Did not qualify							
(France) Paris 2024	Did not qualify							
Total	5/12	0 titles	31	4	27	1988	2516	−528

=== FIBA World Cup ===
Year	Round	Position	GP	W	L	GS	GA	GD
Colombia 1982	Did not qualify							
Spain 1986		20th	5	1	4	334	417	−83
Argentina 1990		13th	8	3	5	688	680	+8
Canada 1994		16th	8	1	7	532	633	−101
Greece 1998	Did not qualify							
United States 2002		11th	8	2	6	600	697	−97
Japan 2006		9th	6	3	3	513	474	+39
Turkey 2010		15th	6	2	4	406	535	−129
Spain 2014		17th	5	2	3	375	399	−24
China 2019		27th	5	1	4	350	435	−85
Philippines/Japan/Indonesia 2023		26th	5	1	4	368	410	−42
Qatar 2027	To be determined							
France 2031	To be determined							
Total	9/12	0 titles	56	16	40	4166	4680	−514

=== FIBA Africa Championship ===
Year	Round	Position	GP	W	L	GS	GA	GD
(Morocco) Rabat 1980		7th	5	2	3	371	404	−33
(Somalia) Mogadishu 1981		10th	5	1	6	275	295	−20
(Egypt) Alexandria 1983	Final round	2nd	6	3	3	450	443	+7
(Ivory Coast) Abidjan 1985	Final round	2nd	7	5	2	576	512	+64
(Tunisia) Tunis 1987	Final round	3rd	5	4	1	387	341	+46
(Angola) Luanda 1989	Final round	1st	7	7	0	607	391	+216
(Egypt) Cairo 1992	Final round	1st	6	6	0	474	380	+94
(Kenya) Nairobi 1993	Final round	1st	6	5	1	522	395	+127
(Algeria) Algiers 1995	Final round	1st	5	5	0	421	253	+168
(Senegal) Dakar 1997	Final round	3rd	5	4	1	324	243	+81
(Angola) Luanda / Cabinda 1999	Final round	1st	7	7	0	586	392	+194
(Morocco) Rabat / Casablanca 2001	Final round	1st	7	6	1	489	406	+83
(Egypt) Alexandria 2003	Final round	1st	7	7	0	603	433	+170
(Algeria) Algiers 2005	Final round	1st	8	8	0	630	400	+230
(Angola) 5 cities 2007	Final round	1st	6	6	0	574	351	+223
(Libya) Tripoli / Benghazi 2009	Final round	1st	9	9	0	768	601	+167
(Madagascar) Antananarivo 2011	Final round	2nd	7	5	2	566	491	+75
(Ivory Coast) Abidjan 2013	Final round	1st	7	7	0	551	411	+140
(Tunisia) Radès 2015	Final round	2nd	7	5	2	493	462	+31
(Tunisia) Radès (Senegal) Dakar 2017	Final Round	7th	4	2	2	270	257	+13
(Rwanda) Kigali 2021	Final Round	5th	5	2	3	356	347	+9
Angola 2025	Final round	1st	6	6	0	469	381	+88
Total	22/22	12 titles	137	112	25	10762	8589	+2173

=== FIBA AfroCan ===
Year	Round	Position	GP	W	L
(Mali) 2019	Third place	3rd	5	4	1
(Angola) 2023	7th place	7th	5	3	3
(Rwanda) 2027	To be determined				
Total	Third place	2/3	10	7	4

=== African Games ===
Year	Round	Position	GP	W	L	GS	GA	GD
(Kenya) Nairobi 1987	Final round	1st	5	4	1	–	–	–
(Egypt) Cairo 1991	No data available							
(Zimbabwe) Harare 1995	Final round	4th	5	2	3	–	–	–
(South Africa) Jo'burg 1999	Final round	2nd	5	4	1	398	358	+40
(Nigeria) Abuja 2003	Final round	3rd	3	3	0	228	180	+48
(Algeria) Algiers 2007	Final round	1st	8	8	0	576	479	+97
(Mozambique) Maputo 2011	Final round	3rd	7	6	1	487	424	+63
(Republic of the Congo) Brazzaville 2015	Final round	1st	6	6	0	511	359	+152
Total	8/8	3 titles	39	33	6	2200	1800	+400

== Team ==
=== Current roster ===
Roster for the AfroBasket 2025.

Angola men's national basketball team roster
Players
Coaches

Pos.	No.	Name	Age – Date of birth	Height	Club	Ctr.
F	0	Eduardo Francisco	21 – 5 November 2003	2.00 m (6 ft 7 in)	Benfica	(Portugal)
G	1	Selton Miguel	24 – 24 October 2000	1.94 m (6 ft 4 in)	Maryland Terrapins	(United States)
G	3	Gerson Gonçalves (C)	29 – 29 March 1996	1.93 m (6 ft 4 in)	Petro de Luanda	(Angola)
PG	5	Childe Dundão	27 – 17 May 1998	1.67 m (5 ft 6 in)	Petro de Luanda	(Angola)
C	13	João Fernandes	32 – 1 December 1992	2.00 m (6 ft 7 in)	Oliveirense	(Portugal)
PF	15	Abou Gakou	28 – 27 May 1997	2.01 m (6 ft 7 in)	Petro de Luanda	(Angola)
PF	22	Silvio De Sousa	26 – 7 October 1998	2.03 m (6 ft 8 in)	Free agent
C	24	Bruno Fernando	26 – 15 August 1998	2.06 m (6 ft 9 in)	Real Madrid	(Spain)
C	34	Kevin Kokila	23 – 3 September 2001	2.05 m (6 ft 9 in)	JL Bourg Basket	(France)
C	44	Jilson Bango	26 – 6 January 1999	2.08 m (6 ft 10 in)	Fenerbaçhe	(Turkey)
SG	47	Milton Valente	26 – 28 September 1998	1.98 m (6 ft 6 in)	Free agent
C	66	Braz Macachi	23 – 5 September 2001	2.02 m (6 ft 8 in)	AD Galomar	(Portugal)

Head coach

- (Spain) Josep Clarós

Assistant coach(es)

- (Angola) Miguel Lutonda
- (Angola) Aníbal Moreira

Legend

- (C) Team captain
- Club – describes last
  club before the tournament
- Age – describes age
  on 12 August 2025

=== Notable players ===
- Jean-Jacques Conceição
- José Carlos Guimarães
- Miguel Lutonda
- Carlos Almeida

=== Head coach position ===
Coach		Years
(Portugal)	Mário Palma	1999–2005
(Portugal)	Luís Magalhães	2009–2010
(France)	Michel Gomez	2011
(Angola)	Paulo Macedo	May 2013 – August 2013
(Spain)	Moncho López	February 2015 – August 2015
(Angola)	Carlos Dinis	February 2016 –
(Angola)	Manuel Silva Gi	May 2017 – September 2017
(United States)	Will Voigt	November 2017 – ?
(Brazil)	José Neto	2020
(Spain)	Josep Clarós	April 2021–present

=== Past rosters ===
Angola national basketball team – 2013 FIBA Africa Championship – Gold Medal roster
Players
Coaches

Pos.	No.	Name	Age – Date of birth	Height	Club
F	4	Olímpio Cipriano	31 – 15 April 1982	1.94 m (6 ft 4 in)	Recreativo do Libolo	(Angola)
G	5	Armando Costa	30 – 3 June 1983	1.92 m (6 ft 4 in)	Primeiro de Agosto	(Angola)
SG	6	Carlos Morais	27 – 16 October 1985	1.93 m (6 ft 4 in)	Petro Atlético	(Angola)
C	7	Valdelício Joaquim	23 – 15 April 1990	2.08 m (6 ft 10 in)	Rainbow Warriors	(United States)
PG	8	Hermenegildo Santos	23 – 16 August 1990	1.88 m (6 ft 2 in)	Primeiro de Agosto	(Angola)
PF	9	Leonel Paulo	27 – 30 April 1986	1.98 m (6 ft 6 in)	Petro Atlético	(Angola)
F/C	10	Joaquim Gomes	32 – 23 December 1980	2.00 m (6 ft 7 in)	Primeiro de Agosto	(Angola)
F	11	Reggie Moore	32 – 31 March 1981	1.98 m (6 ft 6 in)	Primeiro de Agosto	(Angola)
F/C	12	Felizardo Ambrósio	25 – 25 October 1987	2.01 m (6 ft 7 in)	Primeiro de Agosto	(Angola)
SF	13	Carlos Almeida (C)	36 – 24 September 1976	1.93 m (6 ft 4 in)	Primeiro de Agosto	(Angola)
PG	14	Mílton Barros	29 – 21 June 1984	1.84 m (6 ft 0 in)	Interclube	(Angola)
PF	15	Eduardo Mingas	34 – 29 January 1979	1.98 m (6 ft 6 in)	Interclube	(Angola)

Head coach

- Paulo Macedo

Assistant coach(es)

- Jaime Covilhã
- Walter Costa

Legend

- Club – describes last
  club before the tournament
- Age – describes age
  on 20 August 2013

Angola national basketball team – 2011 FIBA Africa Championship – Silver Medal roster
Players
Coaches

Pos.	No.	Name	Age – Date of birth	Height	Club	Ctr.
F	4	Valdelício Joaquim	22 – 15 April 1990	1.96 m (6 ft 5 in)	Rainbow Warriors	(United States)
G	5	Armando Costa	28 – 3 June 1983	1.92 m (6 ft 4 in)	Primeiro de Agosto	(Angola)
SG	6	Carlos Morais	25 – 16 October 1985	1.93 m (6 ft 4 in)	Petro Atlético	(Angola)
PG	7	Domingos Bonifácio	27 – 28 October 1984	1.85 m (6 ft 1 in)	Recreativo do Libolo	(Angola)
F	8	Simão Santos	22 – 16 December 1989	1.96 m (6 ft 5 in)	Recreativo do Libolo	(Angola)
PF	9	Leonel Paulo	25 – 30 April 1986	1.98 m (6 ft 6 in)	Recreativo do Libolo	(Angola)
F/C	10	Joaquim Gomes (C)	30 – 23 December 1980	2.00 m (6 ft 7 in)	Primeiro de Agosto	(Angola)
C	11	Miguel Kiala	26 – 10 November 1985	2.06 m (6 ft 9 in)	Petro Atlético	(Angola)
F/C	12	Felizardo Ambrósio	23 – 25 October 1987	2.01 m (6 ft 7 in)	Primeiro de Agosto	(Angola)
C	13	Jorge Tati	22 – 10 June 1990	2.08 m (6 ft 10 in)	Interclube	(Angola)
PG	14	Milton Barros	27 – 21 June 1984	1.84 m (6 ft 0 in)	Recreativo do Libolo	(Angola)
PF	15	Eduardo Mingas	32 – 29 January 1979	1.98 m (6 ft 6 in)	Interclube	(Angola)

Head coach

- (France) Michel Gomez

Assistant coach(es)

- (Angola) Jaime Covilhã
- (Angola) Artur Barros

Legend

- (C) Team captain
- nat field describes country

Angola national basketball team – 2009 FIBA Africa Championship – Gold Medal roster
Players
Coaches

Pos.	No.	Name	Age – Date of birth	Height	Club	Ctr.
F	4	Olímpio Cipriano	27 – 9 April 1982	1.94 m (6 ft 4 in)	Primeiro de Agosto	(Angola)
G	5	Armando Costa	26 – 3 June 1983	1.92 m (6 ft 4 in)	Primeiro de Agosto	(Angola)
SG	6	Carlos Morais	23 – 16 October 1985	1.93 m (6 ft 4 in)	Petro Atlético	(Angola)
PG	7	Domingos Bonifácio	24 – 28 October 1984	1.85 m (6 ft 1 in)	Recreativo do Libolo	(Angola)
F	8	Luís Costa	31 – 7 June 1978	1.96 m (6 ft 5 in)	Recreativo do Libolo	(Angola)
PF	9	Leonel Paulo	23 – 30 April 1986	1.98 m (6 ft 6 in)	Recreativo do Libolo	(Angola)
F/C	10	Joaquim Gomes	28 – 23 December 1980	2.00 m (6 ft 7 in)	Primeiro de Agosto	(Angola)
C	11	Adolfo Quimbamba	26 – 26 December 1982	2.06 m (6 ft 9 in)	ASA	(Angola)
F/C	12	Felizardo Ambrósio	21 – 25 October 1987	2.01 m (6 ft 7 in)	Primeiro de Agosto	(Angola)
SF	13	Carlos Almeida (C)	32 – 24 September 1976	1.93 m (6 ft 4 in)	Primeiro de Agosto	(Angola)
SF	14	Filipe Abraão	29 – 31 December 1979	1.84 m (6 ft 0 in)	ASA	(Angola)
PF	15	Eduardo Mingas	30 – 29 January 1979	1.98 m (6 ft 6 in)	Petro Atlético	(Angola)

Head coach

- (Portugal) Luís Magalhães

Assistant coach(es)

- (Angola) Ângelo Victoriano
- (Angola) Jaime Prades

Legend

- (C) Team captain
- nat field describes country

Angola national basketball team – 2007 FIBA Africa Championship – Gold Medal roster
Players
Coaches

Pos.	No.	Name	Age – Date of birth	Height	Club	Ctr.
F	4	Olímpio Cipriano	25 – 9 April 1982	1.94 m (6 ft 4 in)	Primeiro de Agosto	(Angola)
G	5	Armando Costa	24 – 3 June 1983	1.92 m (6 ft 4 in)	Primeiro de Agosto	(Angola)
SG	6	Carlos Morais	21 – 16 October 1985	1.93 m (6 ft 4 in)	Petro Atlético	(Angola)
PG	7	Milton Barros	23 – 21 June 1984	1.84 m (6 ft 0 in)	Petro Atlético	(Angola)
F	8	Luís Costa	29 – 7 June 1978	1.96 m (6 ft 5 in)	Petro Atlético	(Angola)
SG	9	Victor de Carvalho	38 – 20 February 1969	1.93 m (6 ft 4 in)	Petro Atlético	(Angola)
F/C	10	Joaquim Gomes	26 – 23 December 1980	2.00 m (6 ft 7 in)	Primeiro de Agosto	(Angola)
C	11	Victor Muzadi	29 – 22 June 1978	2.01 m (6 ft 7 in)	Primeiro de Agosto	(Angola)
F/C	12	Felizardo Ambrósio	19 – 25 October 1987	2.01 m (6 ft 7 in)	Primeiro de Agosto	(Angola)
SF	13	Carlos Almeida (C)	30 – 24 September 1976	1.93 m (6 ft 4 in)	Primeiro de Agosto	(Angola)
PG	14	Miguel Lutonda	35 – 24 December 1971	1.84 m (6 ft 0 in)	Primeiro de Agosto	(Angola)
PF	15	Eduardo Mingas	28 – 29 January 1979	1.98 m (6 ft 6 in)	Petro Atlético	(Angola)

Head coach

- (Angola) Alberto de Carvalho

Assistant coach(es)

- (Angola) José Carlos Guimarães
- (Angola) Artur Barros

Legend

- (C) Team captain
- nat field describes country

Angola national basketball team – 2005 FIBA Africa Championship – Gold Medal roster
Players
Coaches

Pos.	No.	Name	Age – Date of birth	Height	Club	Ctr.
F	4	Olímpio Cipriano	23 – 9 April 1982	1.93 m (6 ft 4 in)	Primeiro de Agosto	(Angola)
G	5	Armando Costa	22 – 3 June 1983	1.92 m (6 ft 4 in)	Queluz	(Portugal)
F	6	Ângelo Victoriano	37 – 8 February 1968	1.96 m (6 ft 5 in)	Primeiro de Agosto	(Angola)
F	7	Gerson Monteiro	32 – 12 July 1973	1.90 m (6 ft 3 in)	Petro de Luanda	(Angola)
PF	8	Vladimir Ricardino	26 – 4 October 1978	2.03 m (6 ft 8 in)	Primeiro de Agosto	(Angola)
SG	9	Carlos Morais	19 – 16 October 1985	1.93 m (6 ft 4 in)	Petro de Luanda	(Angola)
F/C	10	Joaquim Gomes	24 – 23 December 1980	2.02 m (6 ft 8 in)	RheinEnergie	(Germany)
C	11	Victor Muzadi	27 – 22 June 1978	2.01 m (6 ft 7 in)	Primeiro de Agosto	(Angola)
C	12	Abdel Bouckar	25 – 8 April 1980	2.04 m (6 ft 8 in)	Benfica Lisboa	(Portugal)
SF	13	Carlos Almeida (C)	28 – 24 September 1976	1.93 m (6 ft 4 in)	Primeiro de Agosto	(Angola)
PG	14	Miguel Lutonda	33 – 24 December 1971	1.84 m (6 ft 0 in)	Primeiro de Agosto	(Angola)
PF	15	Eduardo Mingas	26 – 29 January 1979	1.98 m (6 ft 6 in)	Interclube	(Angola)

Head coach

- (Portugal) Mário Palma

Assistant coach(es)

- (Angola) Jaime Covilhã
- (Angola) José Pontes

Legend

- (C) Team captain
- nat field describes country

Angola national basketball team – 2003 FIBA Africa Championship – Gold Medal roster
Players
Coaches

Pos.	No.	Name	Age – Date of birth	Height	Club	Ctr.
SF	4	Afonso Silva	29 – 24 July 1974	1.90 m (6 ft 3 in)	Primeiro de Agosto	(Angola)
PG	5	Walter Costa	30 – 25 March 1973	1.85 m (6 ft 1 in)	Primeiro de Agosto	(Angola)
PF	6	Ângelo Victoriano	35 – 8 February 1968	1.96 m (6 ft 5 in)	Primeiro de Agosto	(Angola)
SF	7	Gerson Monteiro	30 – 12 July 1973	1.90 m (6 ft 3 in)	Barreirense	(Portugal)
PF	8	Edmar Victoriano	27 – 1 November 1975	1.95 m (6 ft 5 in)	Primeiro de Agosto	(Angola)
SG	9	Víctor de Carvalho	34 – 20 February 1969	1.93 m (6 ft 4 in)	Petro Atlético	(Angola)
F/C	10	Joaquim Gomes	22 – 23 December 1980	2.00 m (6 ft 7 in)	Valparaiso Crusaders	(United States)
C	11	Victor Muzadi	25 – 22 June 1978	2.01 m (6 ft 7 in)	Primeiro de Agosto	(Angola)
C	12	Abdel Bouckar	23 – 8 April 1980	2.04 m (6 ft 8 in)	Primeiro de Agosto	(Angola)
SG	13	Carlos Almeida	26 – 24 September 1976	1.93 m (6 ft 4 in)	Primeiro de Agosto	(Angola)
PG	14	Miguel Lutonda	31 – 24 December 1971	1.86 m (6 ft 1 in)	Primeiro de Agosto	(Angola)
F/C	15	Jean-Jacques Conceição	39 – 3 April 1964	1.98 m (6 ft 6 in)	Portugal Telecom	(Portugal)

Head coach

- (Portugal) Mário Palma

Assistant coach(es)

- (Angola) Raúl Duarte
- (Angola) Jaime Covilhã

Legend

- (C) Team captain
- Club field describes current club

Angola national basketball team – 2001 FIBA Africa Championship – Gold Medal roster
Players
Coaches

Pos.	No.	Name	Age – Date of birth	Height	Club	Ctr.
C	4	Victor Muzadi	23 – 22 June 1978	2.01 m (6 ft 7 in)	Primeiro de Agosto	(Angola)
PG	5	Walter Costa	28 – 25 March 1973	1.85 m (6 ft 1 in)	Primeiro de Agosto	(Angola)
PF	6	Ângelo Victoriano	33 – 8 February 1968	1.96 m (6 ft 5 in)	Primeiro de Agosto	(Angola)
SF	7	Gerson Monteiro	28 – 12 July 1973	1.90 m (6 ft 3 in)	Ovarense	(Portugal)
PF	8	Edmar Victoriano	25 – 1 November 1975	1.95 m (6 ft 5 in)	Petro Atlético	(Angola)
C	9	Buila Katiavala	25 – 13 May 1976	2.06 m (6 ft 9 in)	Primeiro de Agosto	(Angola)
PF	10	José Nascimento	22 – 1 January 1979	1.96 m (6 ft 5 in)	Primeiro de Agosto	(Angola)
SF	11	Mário Belarmino	26 – 22 September 1974	1.96 m (6 ft 5 in)	Petro Atlético	(Angola)
F/C	12	David Dias	32 – 21 April 1969	1.99 m (6 ft 6 in)	Barreirense	(Portugal)
SG	13	Carlos Almeida	24 – 24 September 1976	1.93 m (6 ft 4 in)	Petro Atlético	(Angola)
PG	14	Miguel Lutonda	29 – 24 December 1971	1.86 m (6 ft 1 in)	Primeiro de Agosto	(Angola)
F/C	15	[[Jean-Jacques |Jean-Jacques]]	37 – 3 April 1964	1.98 m (6 ft 6 in)	Portugal Telecom	(Portugal)

Head coach

- (Portugal) Mário Palma

Assistant coach(es)

Legend

- (C) Team captain
- Club field describes current club

Angola national basketball team – 1999 FIBA Africa Championship – Gold Medal roster
Players
Coaches

Pos.	No.	Name	Age – Date of birth	Height	Club	Ctr.
C	4	Justino Victoriano	25 – 19 February 1974	2.02 m (6 ft 8 in)	UTEP Miners	(United States)
SG	5	Aníbal Moreira	32 – 19 September 1966	1.93 m (6 ft 4 in)	Queluz	(Portugal)
PF	6	Ângelo Victoriano	31 – 8 February 1968	1.96 m (6 ft 5 in)	Primeiro de Agosto	(Angola)
PG	7	Cristóvão Swingue	22 – 1 January 1977	1.82 m (6 ft 0 in)	Petro de Luanda	(Angola)
PF	8	Edmar Victoriano	23 – 1 November 1975	1.95 m (6 ft 5 in)	Petro de Luanda	(Angola)
SG	9	Víctor de Carvalho	30 – 20 February 1969	1.93 m (6 ft 4 in)	Petro de Luanda	(Angola)
PF	10	Herlander Coimbra	31 – 16 June 1968	2.00 m (6 ft 7 in)	Primeiro de Agosto	(Angola)
F/C	11	Joaquim Gomes	18 – 23 December 1980	2.00 m (6 ft 7 in)	Petro de Luanda	(Angola)
F/C	12	David Dias	30 – 21 April 1969	1.99 m (6 ft 6 in)	Primeiro de Agosto	(Angola)
SG	13	Carlos Almeida	22 – 24 September 1976	1.93 m (6 ft 4 in)	Petro de Luanda	(Angola)
PG	14	Miguel Lutonda	27 – 24 December 1971	1.86 m (6 ft 1 in)	Primeiro de Agosto	(Angola)
F/C	15	Jean-Jacques Conceição	35 – 3 April 1964	1.98 m (6 ft 6 in)	Málaga	(Spain)

Head coach

- (Portugal) Mário Palma

Assistant coach(es)

Legend

- (C) Team captain
- Club field describes current club

== All-time record against all nations ==
Against	Pld	Wn	Lst	GF	GA	GD	Details
Algeria	4	2	2	377	354	+23	Extended content 74–58 2011 AG 3P (17 Sep 2011) Maputo 78–68 2001 AB F (12 Aug 2001) Rabat 70–78 2001 AB PR (6 Aug 2001) Casablanca 71–65 1983 AB PR (21 Dec 1983) Alexandria 84–85 1981 AB PR (16 Dec 1981) Mogadishu
Argentina	3	0	3	191	224	−33	Extended content 70–91 2010 WC PR (30 Aug 2010) Kayseri 59–67 1994 WC PR (6 Aug 1994) Hamilton 62–66 1996 OL PR (26 Jul 1996) Atlanta
Australia	5	2	3	354	397	−43	Extended content 91–83 2014 WC PR (4 Sep 2014) Las Palmas 55–76 2010 WC PR (1 Sep 2010) Kayseri 59–83 2004 OL PR (17 Aug 2004) Athens 75–86 2000 OL PR (23 Sep 2000) Sydney 74–69 1986 WC PR (8 Jul 1986) Ferrol
Brazil	3	1	2	228	240	−12	Extended content 83–86 2002 WC PR (2 Sep 2002) Indianapolis 79–78 1994 WC PR (11 Aug 1994) Hamilton 66–76 1992 OL PR (29 Jul 1992) Barcelona
Cameroon	4	4	0	316	284	+32	Extended content 84–83 2011 AB QF (25 Aug 2011) Antananarivo 86–72 2007 AB F (25 Aug 2007) Luanda 71–63 2007 AG PL (16 Jul 2007) Algiers 75–66 1999 AG (14 Sep 1999) Johannesburg
Canada	4	1	3	270	338	−68	Extended content 84–74 2002 WC PR (30 Aug 2002) Indianapolis 54–99 2000 OL PR (19 Sep 2000) Sydney 52–83 1994 WC PR (4 Aug 1994) Toronto 80–82 1990 WC PR (14 Aug 1990) Salta
Cape Verde	5	5	0	402	259	+143	Extended content 75–50 2013 AB PR (20 Aug 2013) Abidjan 67–62 2011 AG PL (11 Sep 2011) Maputo 93–60 2007 AB SF (23 Aug 2007) Luanda 100–44 2007 AB PR (18 Aug 2007) Benguela 67–43 1997 AB PR (25 Jul 1997) Dakar
Central African Republic	10	9	1	774	628	+146	Extended content 66–44 2017 AB PR (10 Sep 2017) Dakar 62–61 2015 AB 1/16 (25 Aug 2015) Radès 85–80 2013 AB PR (24 Aug 2013) Abidjan 84–63 2009 AB QF (13 Aug 2009) Tripoli 78–51 2007 AB QF (21 Aug 2007) Luanda 77–46 2005 AB PR (18 Aug 2005) Algiers 71–57 2001 AB PR (5 Aug 2001) Casablanca 71–62 1992 AB PR (28 Dec 1992) Cairo 102–84 1985 AB PR (20 Dec 1985) Abidjan 78–80 1983 AB PR (23 Dec 1983) Alexandria
Chad	1	1	0	115	56	+59	Extended content 115–56 2011 AB PR (18 Aug 2011) Antananarivo
China	5	3	2	422	404	+18	Extended content 68–85 2008 OL PR (14 Aug 2008) Beijing 96–84 2002 WC CL (7 Sep 2002) Indianapolis 67–70 1996 OL PR (20 Jul 1996) Atlanta 79–69 1992 OL CL (4 Aug 1992) Barcelona 112–96 1990 WC CL (19 Aug 1990) Salta
Congo	3	2	1	235	215	+20	Extended content 81–65 2015 AG PL (14 Sep 2015) Brazzaville 90–77 1985 AB PR (22 Dec 1985) Abidjan 64–73 1981 AB PR (17 Dec 1981) Mogadishu
Croatia	2	0	2	112	144	−32	Extended content 48–71 1996 OL PR (22 Jul 1996) Atlanta 64–73 1992 OL PR (2 Aug 1992) Barcelona
DR Congo	2	1	1	130	132	−2	Extended content 72–53 2007 AG PL (12 Jul 2007) Algiers 58–79 1980 AB PR (25 Mar 1980) Rabat
Egypt	21	16	5	1560	1392	+168	Extended content 83–73 2015 AG F (18 Sep 2015) Brazzaville 74–63 2015 AG PL (9 Sep 2015) Brazzaville 83–63 2015 AB QF (27 Aug 2015) Radès 57–40 2013 AB F (31 Aug 2013) Abidjan 88–81 2011 AG PL (15 Sep 2011) Maputo 79–69 2009 AB PR (6 Aug 2009) Benghazi 56–50 2007 AG F (22 Jul 2007) Algiers 64–61 2003 AB SF (14 Aug 2003) Alexandria 72–60 2001 AB SF (11 Aug 2001) Rabat 72–73 1999 AG (12 Sep 1999) Johannesburg 79–55 1997 AB 3P (3 Aug 1997) Dakar 62–43 1997 AB PR (27 Jul 1997) Dakar 69–61 1993 AB F (28 Sep 1993) Nairobi 79–82 1993 AB PR (23 Sep 1993) Nairobi 83–70 1990 WC CL (17 Aug 1990) Salta 89–62 1989 AB F (27 Dec 1989) Luanda 71–61 1989 AB PR (18 Dec 1989) Luanda 77–83 1987 AB SF (26 Dec 1987) Tunis 83–69 1985 AB SF (27 Dec 1985) Abidjan 68–94 1983 AB F (28 Dec 1983) Alexandria 72–79 1983 AB PR (20 Dec 1983) Alexandria
France	1	0	1	62	68	−6	Extended content 62–68 2006 WC 1/16 (27 Aug 2006) Saitama
Gabon	2	2	0	188	96	+92	Extended content 104–49 2015 AG PL (10 Sep 2015) Brazzaville 84–47 1993 AB PR (20 Sep 1993) Nairobi
Germany	5	0	5	396	445	−49	Extended content 88–92 2010 WC PR (1 Sep 2010) Kayseri 66–95 2008 OL PR (10 Aug 2008) Beijing 103–108 2006 WC PR (24 Aug 2006) Hiroshima 76–86 1994 WC PR (8 Aug 1994) Hamilton 63–64 1992 OL PR (27 Jul 1992) Barcelona
Greece	2	0	2	117	190	−73	Extended content 61–102 2008 OL PR (16 Aug 2008) Beijing 56–88 2004 OL PR (21 Aug 2004) Athens
Guinea	1	1	0	102	88	+14	Extended content 102–88 1980 AB PR (24 Mar 1980) Rabat
Israel	1	0	1	75	95	−20	Extended content 75–95 1986 WC PR (6 Jul 1986) Ferrol
Italy	1	0	1	78	86	−8	Extended content 78–86 1990 WC PR (13 Aug 1990) Salta
Ivory Coast	11	7	4	814	761	+53	Extended content 66–59 2013 AB SF (30 Aug 2013) Abidjan 60–43 2011 AG PL (10 Sep 2011) Maputo 82–72 2009 AB F (15 Aug 2009) Tripoli 88–61 2009 AB PR (10 Aug 2009) Benghazi 86–56 2003 AG (10 Oct 2003) Abuja 98–74 1999 AB PR (3 Aug 1999) Luanda 53–78 1993 AB PR (19 Sep 1993) Nairobi 72–57 1989 AB PR (16 Dec 1989) Luanda 73–84 1985 AB F (28 Dec 1985) Abidjan 77–92 1985 AB PR (21 Dec 1985) Abidjan 59–85 1980 AB PR (23 Mar 1980) Rabat
Japan	1	1	0	87	62	+25	Extended content 87–62 2006 WC PR (20 Aug 2006) Hiroshima
Jordan	1	1	0	79	65	+25	Extended content 79–65 2010 WC PR (29 Aug 2010) Kayseri
Kenya	3	3	0	270	157	+113	Extended content 110–40 1989 AB PR (21 Dec 1989) Luanda 85–53 1987 AG SF (9 Aug 1987) Nairobi 75–64 1985 AB PR (24 Dec 1985) Abidjan
Liberia	2	2	0	184	127	+57	Extended content 91–63 2007 AG PL (13 Jul 2007) Algiers 93–64 1983 AB PR (22 Dec 1983) Alexandria
Libya	1	1	0	91	58	+33	Extended content 91–58 2009 AB PR (9 Aug 2009) Benghazi
Lithuania	3	0	3	184	238	−54	Extended content 62–75 2014 WC PR (31 Aug 2014) Las Palmas 73–78 2004 OL PR (15 Aug 2004) Athens 49–85 1996 OL PR (26 Jul 1996) Atlanta
North Macedonia	1	1	0	88	84	+4	Extended content 88–84 2012 OL QL (2 Jul 2012) Caracas
Madagascar	2	2	0	103	64	+39	Extended content 103–64 2003 AB PR (13 Aug 2003) Alexandria ?–? 1987 AG PL (— Jul 1987) Nairobi
Mali	14	13	1	1092	834	+258	Extended content 76–62 2015 AG SF (15 Sep 2015) Brazzaville 82–36 2013 AB 1/16 (26 Aug 2013) Abidjan 79–74 2009 AB PR (5 Aug 2009) Benghazi 74–60 2007 AG SF (20 Jul 2007) Algiers 71–64 2007 AG PL (17 Jul 2007) Algiers 67–50 2005 AB QF (22 Aug 2005) Algiers 77–69 1999 AB SF (5 Aug 1999) Luanda 69–49 1997 AB PR (29 Jul 1997) Dakar 90–51 1995 AB PR (13 Dec 1995) Algiers 70–74 1995 AG SF (19 Sep 1995) Harare 91–59 1992 AB SF (7 Jan 1993) Cairo 92–55 1989 AB SF (26 Dec 1989) Luanda 73–71 1987 AB 3P (27 Dec 1987) Tunis 81–60 1987 AB PR (18 Dec 1987) Tunis
Morocco	11	9	2	881	675	+206	Extended content 62–56 2019 WC QL (24 Nov 2017) Luanda 53–60 2017 AB PR (9 Sep 2017) Dakar 68–67 2015 AB PR (22 Aug 2015) Radès 95–73 2013 AB QF (28 Aug 2013) Abidjan 75–61 2011 AB PR (22 Aug 2011) Antananarivo 108–58 2007 AB PR (19 Aug 2007) Benguela 75–43 2005 AB PR (20 Aug 2005) Algiers 106–65 2003 AB PR (12 Aug 2003) Alexandria 82–61 1992 AB PR (29 Dec 1992) Cairo 90–50 1989 AB PR (20 Dec 1989) Luanda 67–81 1980 AB PR (22 Mar 1980) Rabat
Mexico	1	0	1	55	79	−24	Extended content 55–79 2014 WC PR (2 Sep 2014) Las Palmas
Mozambique	8	8	0	739	433	+306	Extended content 84–72 2015 AB PR (20 Aug 2015) Radès 91–73 2013 AB PR (22 Aug 2013) Abidjan 82–71 2011 AB 1/16 (23 Aug 2011) Antananarivo 93–50 2009 AB PR (7 Aug 2009) Benghazi 100–37 2005 AB PR (19 Aug 2005) Algiers 104–47 1999 AB PR (31 Jul 1999) Luanda 117–40 1995 AB PR (15 Dec 1995) Algiers 68–43 1995 AG QL (25 Mar 1995) Maputo
Nigeria	16	12	4	1068	1004	+64	Extended content 65–74 2015 AB F (30 Aug 2015) Radès 56–62 2011 AG SF (16 Sep 2011) Maputo 76–68 2011 AB SF (27 Aug 2011) Antananarivo 93–85 2009 AB PR (11 Aug 2009) Benghazi 61–58 2007 AG PL (14 Jul 2007) Algiers 67–62 2005 AB SF (23 Aug 2005) Algiers 73–70 2003 AG (9 Oct 2003) Abuja 85–65 2003 AB F (16 Aug 2003) Luanda 54–43 2001 AB PR (7 Aug 2001) Casablanca 79–72 1999 AB F (6 Aug 1999) Luanda 94–90 1999 AG (18 Sep 1999) Johannesburg 64–57 1999 AB PR (1 Aug 1999) Luanda 74–56 1995 AB SF (17 Dec 1995) Algiers ?–? 1995 AG 3P (21 Sep 1995) Harare 87–67 1987 AB PR (19 Dec 1987) Tunis 40–75 1987 AG PL (2 Aug 1987) Nairobi
New Zealand	3	1	2	219	211	+8	Extended content 64–68 2012 OL QL (4 Jul 2012) Caracas 95–73 2006 WC PR (21 Aug 2006) Hiroshima 60–70 2000 OL CL (26 Sep 2000) Sydney
Panama	1	1	0	83	70	+13	Extended content 83–70 2006 WC PR (19 Aug 2006) Hiroshima
Puerto Rico	5	0	5	390	417	−27	Extended content 81–91 2016 OL QL (5 Jul 2016) Belgrade 80–83 2004 OL PR (19 Aug 2004) Athens 87–89 2002 WC PR (3 Sep 2002) Indianapolis 67–76 1996 OL CL (30 Jul 1996) Atlanta 75–78 1990 WC PR (8 Aug 1990) Santa Fe
Russia	4	0	4	253	339	−86	Extended content 65–80 2012 OL QL (6 Jul 2012) Caracas 66–77 2002 WC CL (6 Sep 2002) Indianapolis 65–88 2000 OL PR (25 Sep 2000) Sydney 57–94 1994 WC PR (5 Aug 1994) Toronto
Rwanda	2	2	0	173	125	+48	Extended content 64–59 2011 AG QF (19 Jul 2011) Maputo 109–66 2007 AB PR (15 Aug 2007) Luanda
Senegal	18	14	4	1193	1085	+108	Extended content 57–66 2017 AB QF (14 Sep 2017) Radès 73–74 2015 AB PR (24 Aug 2015) Radès 78–85 2011 AB PR (20 Aug 2011) Antananarivo 70–61 2005 AB F (24 Aug 2005) Algiers 67–59 2005 AB PR (16 Aug 2005) Algiers 69–54 2003 AG (6 Oct 2003) Abuja 73–60 2003 AB PR (8 Aug 2003) Alexandria 68–60 2001 AB PR (8 Aug 2001) Casablanca 74–71 1999 AG (13 Sep 1999) Johannesburg 47–53 1997 AB SF (2 Aug 1997) Dakar 67–55 1995 AB F (18 Dec 1995) Algiers 73–51 1995 AB PR (11 Dec 1995) Algiers 91–80 1993 AB SF (27 Sep 1993) Nairobi 71–66 1992 AB F (8 Jan 1993) Cairo 68–64 1992 AB PR (5 Jan 1993) Cairo 79–65 1987 AG F (11 Aug 1987) Nairobi ?–? 1987 AG PL (— Jul 1987) Nairobi 68–61 1983 AB SF (27 Dec 1983) Alexandria
Serbia	3	0	3	166	262	−96	Extended content 60–83 2016 OL QL (6 Jul 2016) Belgrade 44–94 2010 WC PR (28 Aug 2010) Kayseri 62–85 2004 OL CL (24 Aug 2004) Sydney
Seychelles	1	1	0	93	47	+46	Extended content 93–47 2015 AG PL (12 Sep 2015) Brazzaville
Slovenia	1	0	1	87	93	−6	Extended content 87–93 2014 WC PR (3 Sep 2014) Las Palmas
Somalia	1	0	1	71	81	−10	Extended content 71–81 1981 AB PR (15 Dec 1981) Mogadishu
South Africa	9	9	0	788	455	+333	Extended content 91–57 2017 AB QL (29 Mar 2017) Lusaka 87–51 2017 AB QL (26 Mar 2017) Lusaka 78–59 2011 AG PL (14 Sep 2011) Maputo 80–68 2007 AG QF (19 Jul 2007) Algiers 107–42 2005 AB PR (15 Aug 2005) Algiers 101–55 2003 AB PR (9 Aug 2003) Alexandria 76–40 2001 AB PR (9 Aug 2001) Casablanca 83–58 1999 AG (17 Sep 1999) Johannesburg 85–25 1999 AB PR (29 Jul 1999) Luanda
South Korea	4	3	1	354	298	+56	Extended content 80–69 2014 WC PR (30 Aug 2014) Las Palmas 99–61 1996 OL CL (3 Aug 1996) Atlanta 71–75 1994 WC CL (12 Aug 1994) Hamilton 104–93 1990 WC PR (15 Aug 1990) Salta
Soviet Union	1	0	1	51	89	−38	Extended content 51–89 1986 WC PR (5 Jul 1986) Ferrol
Spain	6	1	5	391	484	−93	Extended content 50–98 2008 OL PR (18 Aug 2008) Beijing 83–93 2006 WC PR (23 Aug 2006) Hiroshima 55–88 2002 WC PR (31 Aug 2002) Indianapolis 45–64 2000 OL PR (17 Sep 2000) Sydney 75–78 1992 OL CL (6 Aug 1992) Barcelona 83–63 1992 OL PR (31 Jul 1992) Barcelona
Tunisia	11	9	2	837	662	+175	Extended content 58–51 2015 AB SF (29 Aug 2015) Radès 56–67 2011 AB F (28 Aug 2011) Antananarivo 79–69 2009 AB SF (14 Aug 2009) Tripoli 71–63 2003 AB PR (10 Aug 2003) Alexandria 79–48 1999 AB PR (2 Aug 1999) Luanda 121–72 1993 AB PR (25 Sep 1993) Nairobi 91–68 1992 AB PR (4 Jan 1993) Cairo 83–66 1989 AB PR (17 Dec 1989) Luanda 69–60 1987 AB PR (18 Dec 1987) Tunis 76–42 1985 AB PR (23 Dec 1985) Abidjan 54–56 1981 AB PR (15 Dec 1981) Mogadishu
Turkey	1	0	1	66	86	−20	Extended content 66–86 2002 WC PR (3 Sep 2002) Indianapolis
Uganda	1	1	0	94	89	+5	Extended content 94–89 2017 AB PR (8 Sep 2017) Dakar
Uruguay	1	1	0	83	81	+2	Extended content 83–81 1986 WC PR (10 Jul 1986) Ferrol
United States	5	0	5	297	510	−213	Extended content 66–121 2010 WC 1/16 (6 Sep 2010) Istanbul 76–97 2008 OL PR (12 Aug 2008) Beijing 53–89 2004 OL PR (23 Aug 2004) Athens 54–87 1996 OL PR (22 Jul 1996) Atlanta 48–116 1992 OL PR (26 Jul 1992) Barcelona
Venezuela	1	0	1	77	83	−6	Extended content 77–83 1990 WC PR (10 Aug 1990) Santa Fe
Yugoslavia	3	0	3	206	278	−72	Extended content 63–113 2002 WC PR (29 Aug 2002) Indianapolis 64–73 2000 OL PR (21 Sep 2000) Sydney 79–92 1990 WC PR (9 Aug 1990) Santa Fe
Zambia	2	2	0	162	99	+63	Extended content 83–45 2017 AB QL (30 Mar 2017) Lusaka  79–54 2017 AB QL (27 Mar 2017) Lusaka
Zimbabwe	1	1	0	82	76	+6	Extended content 82–76 1995 AG PL (14 Sep 1995) Harare

== See also ==
- Angola national basketball team Under-18
- Angola national basketball team Under-16
- List of Angola national basketball team players
