= Abdel Bouckar =

Chadian-Angolan basketball center

Personal information
- Born: April 8, 1980 (age 46) N'Djamena, Chad
- Listed height: 204 cm (6.69 ft)
- Listed weight: 109 kg (240 lb)

Career information
- Playing career: 1996–2014
- Position: Center

Career history
- 1997–2000: ASA
- 2001–2004: 1º de Agosto
- 2004–2005: Benfica Lisboa
- 2005–2007: 1º de Agosto
- 2008–2009: Petro Atlético
- 2010–2014: Recreativo do Libolo

Abdel Aziz Boukar Moussa (born 8 April 1980 in Chad) is a Chadian-born Angolan basketball center. He is a former member of the Angola national basketball team, and competed for Angola at the 2004 Summer Olympics, 2005 African Championship, 2006 Lusophony Games and 2006 FIBA World Championship. He stands 6 ft 8 in (2.03 m).

He last played for Recreativo do Libolo at the Angolan major basketball league BAI Basket.

== Personal ==
Moussa grew up in Chad and acquired Angolan citizenship in 2001.
