= Gerson Monteiro =

Portuguese-Angolan basketball player (born 1973)

Personal information
- Born: July 12, 1973 (age 53) Benguela, Angola
- Listed height: 190 cm (6.2 ft)
- Listed weight: 90 kg (198 lb)

Career information
- Playing career: 1991–2010
- Position: Forward

Career history
- 2000–2001: Barreirense
- 2001: Ovarense
- 2002–2003: Barreirense
- 2004–2006: Petro Atlético
- 2006–2007: 1º de Agosto
- 2007–2008: Lusitânia
- 2008–2010: Recreativo do Libolo

Walter Gerson Correia da Rocha Monteiro (born 12 July 1973 in Benguela, Angola) is a former Angolan professional basketball player. He played internationally with the Angola national basketball team. He is also a Portuguese citizen. He ended his career playing for Recreativo do Libolo at the Angolan major basketball league BAI Basket.

== Career ==
=== Club ===
From 1993 to 2003, Monteiro played on various clubs in Portugal, including Ovarense, Oliveirense, and Barreirense. In 2004, he attempted to join the San Antonio Spurs of the NBA, but was cut during pre-season camp. Afterwards, Monteiro returned to his native Angola, playing for Petro Atlético, where he won one title, before moving to Primeiro de Agosto and finally to Recreativo do Libolo. At the moment Gerson is coach at Benfica de Oliveira de Azeméis.

=== International ===
Monteiro has played internationally with the national team since 2001 at competitions in the United States in 2002 and Japan in 2006, and the 2004 Athens Summer Olympics, where he had the 2nd highest individual 3 pt shooting percentage among all the players. They have won 3 consecutive titles at the FIBA Africa Championships and one at the 2007 All-Africa Games.
