= Jorge Tati =

Angolan basketball player

No. 13 – Benfica do Libolo
- Position: Small forward
- League: BIC Basket; Africa Champions Cup

Personal information
- Born: 17 June 1983 (age 43) Buco Zau, Angola
- Listed height: 2.00 cm (0.0656 ft)
- Listed weight: 106 kg (234 lb)

Career history
- 2002: PROMADE
- 2004–2006: Petro Atlético
- 2007: Misto de Cabinda
- 2007–present: Interclube
- 2015–2016: 1º de Agosto
- 2017–2018: Benfica do Libolo
- 2018- present: Clube Atlético de Queluz

Jorge Boreis Tati (born 17 June 1983 in Buco Zau, Angola), is a professional Angolan basketball player. Tati, who is 2.00 cm (0.79 in) in height and weighs 106 kg (234 lb), plays as a small forward. He competed for Angola at the 2011 FIBA Africa Championship.

He is currently playing for G.D. Física Torres Vedras.

== See also ==
- Angola national basketball team
