= José Carlos Guimarães =

Angolan basketball player

Personal information
- Born: April 9, 1964 (age 62) Luanda, Angola
- Listed height: 190 cm (6 ft 3 in)
- Listed weight: 96 kg (212 lb)

Career information
- Playing career: 1982–2000
- Position: Point guard
- Coaching career: 2003–present

Career history

Playing
- FC Luanda
- 1982–1984: Leões de Luanda
- 1984-1989: Benfica
- 1989-1992: FC Porto
- 1992–1994: Benfica
- 1995: Ovarense
- 1999: 1º de Agosto

Coaching
- 2003–2004: Sporting de Cabinda
- PROMADE
- 2010–2012: Interclube
- 2012–2013: Angola
- 2021–2022: Primeiro de Agosto
Medals
Men's basketball
Representing Angola
FIBA Africa Under-18 Championship
Gold medal – first place	Luanda 1980	Angola
Gold medal – first place	Maputo 1982	Angola
FIBA Africa Championship
Gold medal – first place	Luanda 1989	Angola
Gold medal – first place	Cairo 1992	Angola
Gold medal – first place	Algiers 1995	Angola
Silver medal – second place	Alexandria 1983	Angola
Silver medal – second place	Abidjan 1985	Angola
Bronze medal – third place	Tunis 1987	Angola

José Carlos Ribeiro de Carvalho Guimarães (born 9 April 1964 in Luanda), known as Zé Carlos, is a former Angolan basketball player and a former coach of the Angola national basketball team. He played as a guard and as a forward. He achieved a huge success in his career playing for Portuguese side Benfica, where he won several National Championship and the Cup of Portugal titles, with his fellow countryman Jean-Jacques. Guimarães also lived the dream of playing against the 1992 US Olympic Dream Team and at the 1996 Summer Olympics. He later became assistant coach of the Angola Squad. He served as coach of the Angolan national basketball team from May 2012 to May 2013.

== Dismissal as head coach ==
On a press conference held on May 31, 2013, Guimarães said he is considering abandoning all basketball-related activity due to the disrespectful manner that some individuals - whom he did not name - handled the case of his dismissal. Guimarães learned of his dismissal, with the announcement by the Angolan Basketball Federation in a previous news conference, of Paulo Macedo as the new head coach. After they let me do all the preparations, summon the players, prepare training camp, they just decided to sack me, he said. Guimarães has been offered, instead, a job as an advisor to the chairman of the Angolan Basketball Federation, Paulo Madeira, which he declined. The Angolan media, generally agrees that the Federation should have handled Mr. Guimarães' dismissal in a more appropriate way, such as giving him proper notice of his own dismissal.
