= Armando Costa =

Angolan basketball player (born 1983)

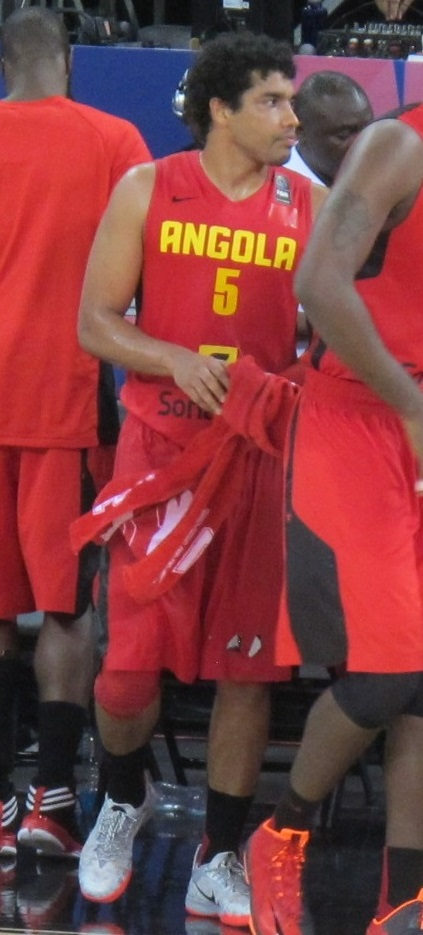
- Armando Costa in 2014

Personal information
- Born: June 3, 1983 (age 43) Luanda, Angola
- Listed height: 192 cm (6.30 ft)
- Listed weight: 91 kg (201 lb)

Career information
- Playing career: 2002–2019
- Position: Point guard

Career history
- 2002–2005: Queluz
- 2005–2019: 1º de Agosto

Armando Carlos Silva e Costa (born 3 June 1983) is an Angolan former professional basketball guard. Costa played for the Angolan side of Primeiro de Agosto in the Angolan league BIC Basket and in the Africa Champions Cup. With the Angola national basketball team, he represented Angola in the 2006 FIBA World Championship, 2007 African Championship, and 2008 Summer Olympics.

== See also ==
Angola national basketball team
