= Víctor de Carvalho =

Angolan basketball player (born 1969)

Petro Atlético
- Position: Shooting guard
- League: BAI Basket; Africa Champions Cup

Personal information
- Born: February 20, 1969 (age 57) Luanda, Angola
- Listed height: 193 cm (6.33 ft)
- Listed weight: 89 kg (196 lb)

Career history
- 2000–2010: Petro Atlético

Victor António Rafael de Carvalho (born 20 February 1969) is a retired Angolan basketball player. He competed internationally with Angola at the Summer Olympics from 1992 to 2004. In 14 games, he averaged 9 points per game. He is from Luanda.
