= Cristóvão Swingue =

Angolan basketball player (born 1976)

Personal information
- Born: November 11, 1976 (age 50) Luanda, Angola
- Listed height: 186 cm (6.10 ft)
- Listed weight: 81 kg (179 lb)
- Position: Point guard

Career history
  - 2003: Petro Atlético
- 2004: Primeiro de Agosto
- 2005 –: Interclube

Cristóvão João Swingue (born 11 November 1976 in Luanda) is an Angolan former basketball player. Swingue, a 6' 10" point guard, played for Angola at the 1999 AfroBasket. On the club level, he played for Petro Atlético and Primeiro de Agosto.
