= Buila Katiavala =

Angolan-Congolese basketball player

Personal information
- Born: May 13, 1976 (age 50) Kananga, Lulua, DRC
- Listed height: 206 cm (6.76 ft)
- Listed weight: 102 kg (225 lb)
- Position: Center

Career history
- 2000–2002: Primeiro de Agosto

Buila Katiavala (born 13 May 1976 in Kananga, Lulua District, Democratic Republic of the Congo) is an Angola-Congolese basketball player with Clube Desportivo da Huíla in Angola. He competed with the Angola national basketball team at the 2000 Summer Olympics.
