= Afonso Silva =

Angolan basketball player

Personal information
- Born: July 24, 1974 (age 52) Luanda, Angola
- Died: March 24, 2024 (aged 49) Luanda, Angola
- Listed height: 191 cm (6.27 ft)
- Listed weight: 92 kg (203 lb)
- Position: Small forward

Career history
- –2005: Primeiro de Agosto
Medals
Men's basketball
Representing Angola
AfroBasket
| Gold medal – first place | Alexandria 2003 | Angola |
| Bronze medal – third place | Dakar 1997 | Angola |
FIBA Africa Clubs Champions Cup
| Gold medal – first place | Luanda 2002 | 1º de Agosto |
| Gold medal – first place | Cairo 2004 | 1º de Agosto |

Afonso Rodrigues da Silva (July 24, 1974 - March 24, 2024) is a former Angolan basketball player. He was listed at 6’3” and 203 pounds.

He died in Luanda on 24 March 2024 at the age of 49.

== See also ==
- Angola national basketball team
