= Jean-Jacques Conceição =

Angolan retired professional basketball player (born 1964)

Jean-Jacques da Conceição
Personal information
- Born: 3 April 1964 (age 62) Kinshasa, Zaire
- Listed height: 6 ft 7.5 in (2.02 m)
- Listed weight: 220 lb (100 kg)

Career information
- NBA draft: 1986: undrafted
- Playing career: 1982–2003
- Position: Power forward
- Number: 15

Career history
- 1982–1988: Primeiro de Agosto
- 1988–1996: Benfica
- 1996–1999: Limoges CSP
- 1999–2000: Unicaja Malaga
- 2000–2003: Portugal Telecom

Career highlights
- Most Valuable African Player of All Time (2011); 10× Portuguese League champion (1989–1995, 2001–2003); 7× Portuguese Federation Cup winner (1992–1996, 2001, 2002); 6× Portuguese League Cup winner (1990, 1991, 1993–1996); 5× Portuguese Super Cup winner (1989, 1991, 1994, 1995, 2002); 5× Angolan League champion (1983, 1985–1988); 4× Angolan Cup winner (1985–1988)
- FIBA Hall of Fame
Medals
Men's basketball
Representing Angola
AfroBasket
Gold medal – first place	Luanda 1989
Gold medal – first place	Cairo 1992
Gold medal – first place	Nairobi 1993
Gold medal – first place	Algiers 1995
Gold medal – first place	Luanda 1999
Gold medal – first place	Casablanca 2001
Gold medal – first place	Alexandria 2003
Silver medal – second place	Alexandria 1983
Silver medal – second place	Abidjan 1985
Bronze medal – third place	Tunis 1987
FIBA Africa U18 Championship
Gold medal – first place	Maputo 1982	Under-18

Jean-Jacques Nzadi da Conceição (born 3 April 1964, in Kinshasa), more commonly known as J.J. Conceição or Jean-Jacques, is an Angolan-Portuguese retired professional basketball player. A 2.02 m (6'7 1/2"), 100 kg (220 lbs.) power forward, he represented Angola at the AfroBasket, where he won a record seven African titles. At the club level, he won five Angolan League championship titles with Primeiro de Agosto and four Angolan Cups, before moving to Benfica in Portugal, where he won seven Portuguese national championships and three Portuguese Federation Cups. He also went on to play for CSP Limoges in France, Baloncesto Málaga in Spain, and Portugal Telecom in Portugal.

== Professional career ==
Even though he never played in the NBA, Jean-Jacques enjoyed a successful career in Europe, especially in Portugal, where he won 10 Portuguese national championships (7 with Benfica and 3 with Portugal Telecom), 7 Portuguese Federation Cups (5 with Benfica and 2 with Portugal Telecom), 5 Portuguese Super Cups (4 with Benfica and 1 with Portugal Telecom), and 6 Portuguese League Cups (all with Benfica).

== National team career ==
As a member of the senior Angolan national team, Conceição won seven AfroBasket gold medals, namely in 1989, 1992, 1993, 1995, 1999, 2001, and 2003. He also won silver medals in 1983 and 1985, and a bronze medal in 1997.

He also played for his country at the FIBA World Cup in 1986, 1990, and 1994. He also played at the Summer Olympic Games in 1992, where he faced the famed Dream Team. The Americans won easily, 116-48, but Conceição led the Angolans with ten points, seven rebounds and two assists.

== Post-career ==
In 2011, in Antananarivo, within the celebrations of the 50th anniversary of FIBA Africa, Jacques was named the most valuable player in African basketball history.

On 19 June 2013, Jean-Jacques became a FIBA Hall of Fame player.

== Titles and medals won ==
=== Pro clubs ===
Year	Competition			
1983	Angolan League (PRI)			
1985	Angolan League (PRI)	Angolan Cup (PRI)		
1986	Angolan League (PRI)	Angolan Cup (PRI)		
1987	Angolan League (PRI)	Angolan Cup (PRI)		
1988	Angolan League (PRI)	Angolan Cup (PRI)		
1989	Portuguese League (BEN)		Portuguese Super Cup (BEN)	
1990	Portuguese League (BEN)			Portuguese League Cup (BEN)
1991	Portuguese League (BEN)		Portuguese Super Cup (BEN)	Portuguese League Cup (BEN)
1992	Portuguese League (BEN)	Portuguese Federation Cup (BEN)		
1993	Portuguese League (BEN)	Portuguese Federation Cup (BEN)		Portuguese League Cup (BEN)
1994	Portuguese League (BEN)	Portuguese Federation Cup (BEN)	Portuguese Super Cup (BEN)	Portuguese League Cup (BEN)
1995	Portuguese League (BEN)	Portuguese Federation Cup (BEN)	Portuguese Super Cup (BEN)	Portuguese League Cup (BEN)
1996		Portuguese Federation Cup (BEN)		Portuguese League Cup (BEN)
2001	Portuguese League (POR)	Portuguese Federation Cup (POR)		
2002	Portuguese League (POR)	Portuguese Federation Cup (POR)	Portuguese Super Cup (POR)	
2003	Portuguese League (POR)			

=== Angolan junior national team ===
Year	Tournament	Medal
1982	FIBA Africa Under-18 Championship (ANG Under-18)	Gold

=== Angolan senior national team ===
Year	Tournament	Medal
1983	AfroBasket (ANG)	Silver
1985	AfroBasket (ANG)	Silver
1987	AfroBasket (ANG)	Bronze
1989	AfroBasket (ANG)	Gold
1992	AfroBasket (ANG)	Gold
1993	AfroBasket (ANG)	Gold
1995	AfroBasket (ANG)	Gold
1999	AfroBasket (ANG)	Gold
2001	AfroBasket (ANG)	Gold
2003	AfroBasket (ANG)	Gold

== Personal life ==
Jean-Jacques Conceição is the father to Angolan-Portuguese basketball player Jacques Conceição.
