= Herlander Coimbra =

Angolan basketball player (born 1968)

Personal information
- Born: June 16, 1968 (age 58) Luanda, Angola
- Listed height: 201 cm (6.59 ft)
- Listed weight: 78 kg (172 lb)
- Position: Small forward

Career history
- Primeiro de Agosto
Medals
Men's basketball
Representing Angola
AfroBasket
Gold medal – first place	Luanda 1989	Angola
Gold medal – first place	Cairo 1992	Angola
Gold medal – first place	Nairobi 1993	Angola
Gold medal – first place	Algiers 1995	Angola

Herlander Fernandes Silva Coimbra (born June 16, 1968 in Luanda) is an Angolan former basketball player. A 6’7”, 172-pound forward, he played on Angola's 1992, 1996, and 2000 Olympic basketball teams.

Coimbra was involved in a confrontation with American player Charles Barkley during the 1992 Barcelona games. Coimbra had hit Barkley while jockeying for position underneath the basket, and Barkley retaliated by elbowing Coimbra in the chest. Barkley later said, "Somebody hits me, I’m going to hit him back – even if it does look like he hasn’t eaten in a while."

Though Barkley drew criticism for his actions and words, Coimbra took everything with good humor and actually struck up a friendship with his American opponent. Barkley later told reporters, "He came looking for me in 1996 in Atlanta to say hello. He said, ‘You made me a big star in my country.’ We’ve had a nice bond." Coimbra’s two-time Olympic teammate Angelo Victoriano also said, "Every time we go to the States, we meet Charles Barkley. He’s very supportive of us."
