= Necas (basketball) =

Angolan basketballer and coach (born 1962)

Primeiro de Agosto
- Position: Shooting guard
- League: Angolan Basketball League

Personal information
- Born: September 18, 1962 (age 64) Luanda, Angola
- Listed height: 185 cm (6.07 ft)
- Coaching career: 2003–present

Career history

Coaching
- 2003–2008: Interclube
- 2012–2013: Interclube
- 2013–2018: Interclube
- 2020–present: Primeiro de Agosto

Career highlights
- As head coach: Angolan Cup winner (2021)
Medals
Representing Angola
Men's basketball
AfroBasket
| Gold medal – first place | 1989 Luanda | Angola |
| Gold medal – first place | 1992 Cairo | Angola |
| Silver medal – second place | 1983 Alexandria | Angola |
| Silver medal – second place | 1985 Abidjan | Angola |
| Bronze medal – third place | 1987 Tunis | Angola |
FIBA Africa Clubs Champions Cup
| Silver medal – second place | 2005 Abidjan | Interclube |
Coach for women's basketball
FIBA Africa Clubs Champions Cup
| Gold medal – first place | 2014 Sfax | Interclube |
| Silver medal – second place | 2015 Luanda | Interclube |

Manuel Nazareth da Costa e Sousa (born 18 September 1962), known as Necas, is an Angolan retired basketball player and current coach. Playing as a shooting guard, Necas was best known for his sharp three-point shooting thus becoming one of the best in this category, along with Víctor de Carvalho.

He served as assistant coach of Angolan side Interclube. On 5 July 2021, Necas took over as head coach of Primeiro de Agosto. He won the 2020–21 Taça de Angola with Primeiro, beating his former team Interclube in the final.

== Awards and accomplishments ==
=== Coaching career ===
Primeiro de Agosto

- Taça de Angola: (2021)
