= Walter Costa =

Angolan basketball player (born 1973)

Personal information
- Born: 25 March 1973 (age 53) Luanda, Angola
- Listed height: 185 cm (6.07 ft)
- Listed weight: 82 kg (181 lb)
- Position: Point guard

Career history
- 2000: ASA
- 2001–2007: 1º de Agosto

Walter Bandeira da Costa (born 25 March 1973) is a retired Angolan basketball point guard. Costa is a former member of the Angola national basketball team. At the 2004 Summer Olympics, the Angolan squad finished in last place and did not win a game.

He is currently the assistant coach of Angolan Basketball team Primeiro de Agosto.
