= FIBA Africa Championship 1989 =

1989 FIBA AfroBasket
15th FIBA African Basketball Championship

Tournament details
- Host country: Angola
- Dates: December 16–27
- Teams: 11 (from 42 confederations)
- Venue: 1 (in 1 host city)

Final positions
- Champions: Angola (1st title)

The FIBA Africa Championship 1989 was hosted by Angola from December 16 to December 27, 1989. The games were played in Luanda. Angola won the tournament, its first African Championship, by beating Egypt in the final. Both teams qualified for the 1990 FIBA World Championship as a result of their showing in this tournament.

== Competing nations ==
The following national teams competed:

Group A	Group B
Algeria; Central African Republic; Mali; Senegal; Zambia	Angola; Ivory Coast; Egypt; Kenya; Morocco; Tunisia

== Preliminary rounds ==
=== Group A ===
Team	Pts	Pld	W	L	PF	PA	Diff
Senegal	8	4	4	0	362	234	+128
Mali	6	4	2	2	289	235	+54
Algeria	6	4	2	2	329	297	+32
Central African Republic	6	4	2	2	381	292	+89
Zambia	4	4	0	4	178	481	-303

Day 1

Mali	94–30	Zambia
Senegal	85–74	Central African Republic

Day 2

Zambia	46–110	Senegal
Algeria	60–77	Mali

Day 3

20 December 1989

Central African Republic	165–46	Zambia
Pts: Goporo 44		Pts: Chawelwa 22

Cidadela, Luanda

20 December 1989

Senegal	89–62	Algeria
Pts: Sene 17		Pts: Samir 10

Cidadela, Luanda

Day 4

Central African Republic	67–66	Mali
Zambia	56–112	Algeria

Day 5

Algeria	95–75	Central African Republic
Senegal	78–52	Mali

=== Group B ===
Team	Pts	Pld	W	L	PF	PA	Diff
Angola	10	5	5	0	426	274	+152
Egypt	9	5	4	1	419	364	+55
Ivory Coast	9	6	3	3	500	503	-3
Tunisia	7	5	2	3	389	402	-13
Morocco	6	5	1	4	348	426	-78
Kenya	4	4	0	4	276	389	-113

Day 1

Angola	72–57	Ivory Coast
Tunisia	98–86	Ivory Coast
Egypt	89–69	Morocco

Day 2

Morocco	87–86	Kenya
Angola	83–66	Tunisia
Egypt	91–81	Ivory Coast

Day 3

20 December 1989

Tunisia	68–64	Morocco
Pts: Ben Cherif 20

Cidadela, Luanda

20 December 1989

Ivory Coast	97–79	Kenya
Pts: Meledj 20		Pts: G.Owino 8

Cidadela, Luanda

20 December 1989

Angola	82–68	Egypt
Pts: Conceição 27		Pts: A.Mohamed 12

Cidadela, Luanda

Day 4

Angola	90–50	Morocco
Egypt	95–71	Kenya
Ivory Coast	86–85	Tunisia

Day 5

Ivory Coast	93–78	Morocco
Egypt	83–72	Tunisia
Angola	110–40	Kenya

== Knockout stage ==
Semi-finals
December 26, 1989
Egypt	81
Senegal	68
December 26, 1989
Angola	92
Mali	55

Final
December 27, 1989
Egypt	62
Angola	89
Third place
December 27, 1989
Senegal	65
Mali	53

26 December 1989

Angola	89–62	Egypt
Scoring by half: 44–23, 45–39
Pts: J.C. Guimarães 29		Pts: Ashraf Mohamed 18

Cidadela, Luanda
Referees: C. Ussene (MOZ), D. Abderahman (ALG)

== Classification Stage ==
Ivory Coast	91–70	Algeria
Tunisia	99–110	Central African Republic
Zambia	65–122	Morocco

== Final standings ==
Rank	Team	Record
1	Angola	7–0
2	Egypt	5–2
3	Senegal	5–1
4	Mali	2–4
5	Ivory Coast	4–3
6	Algeria	2–3
7	Central African Republic	3–2
8	Tunisia	2–4
9	Morocco	2–4
10	Zambia	0–5
11	Kenya	0–4

== Awards ==
1989 FIBA Africa Championship winners

Angola
First title

Most Valuable Player
