= FIBA Africa Championship 1992 =

1992 FIBA AfroBasket
16th FIBA African Basketball Championship

Tournament details
- Host country: Egypt
- Dates: December 28-January 8
- Teams: 11 (from 44 federations)
- Venue: 1 (in 1 host city)

Final positions
- Champions: Angola (2nd title)

The FIBA Africa Championship 1992 was hosted by Egypt from December 28 to January 8, 1993. The games were played in Cairo. Angola won the tournament, the country's 2nd consecutive African championship, by beating Senegal in the final.

== Competing nations ==
The following national teams competed:

Group A	Group B
Algeria; Cameroon; Ivory Coast; Egypt; Mali; Nigeria	Angola; Central African Republic; Morocco; Senegal; Tunisia

== Preliminary rounds ==
=== Group A ===
Team	Pts	Pld	W	L	PF	PA	Diff
Egypt	10	5	5	0	451	354	+97
Mali	8	5	3	2	328	379	-51
Nigeria	8	5	3	2	368	370	-2
Cameroon	7	5	2	3	335	356	-21
Algeria	6	5	1	4	362	372	-10
Ivory Coast	6	5	1	4	393	406	-13

Day 1

Egypt	108–56	Mali
Cameroon	64–63	Algeria
Nigeria	75–68	Ivory Coast

Day 2

Egypt	89–85	Nigeria
Cameroon	95–83	Ivory Coast
Mali	74–73	Algeria

Day 3

Algeria	80–78	Ivory Coast
Mali	75–63	Nigeria
Egypt	75–49	Cameroon

Day 4

Mali	65–61	Cameroon
Nigeria	75–72	Algeria
Egypt	98–90	Ivory Coast

Day 5

Nigeria	70–66	Cameroon
Egypt	81–74	Algeria
Ivory Coast	74–58	Mali

=== Group B ===
Team	Pts	Pld	W	L	PF	PA	Diff
Angola	8	4	4	0	312	255	+57
Senegal	7	4	3	1	285	267	+18
Central African Republic	6	4	2	2	289	273	+16
Morocco	3	4	0	4	172	242	-70
Tunisia	5	4	1	3	224	245	-21

Day 1

Senegal	66–57	Morocco
Angola	71–62	Central African Republic

Day 2

Tunisia	70–77	Central African Republic
Angola	82–61	Morocco

Day 3

Central African Republic	74–54	Morocco
Tunisia	66–77	Senegal

Day 4

Angola	91–68	Tunisia
Senegal	78–76	Central African Republic

Day 5

Morocco	0–20	Tunisia
Angola	68–64	Senegal

== Knockout stage ==
Semi-finals
January 7, 1993
Senegal	99
Egypt	83
January 7, 1993
Angola	91
Mali	59

Final
January 8, 1993
Angola	71
Senegal	66
Third place
January 8, 1993
Egypt	97
Mali	81

== Classification Stage ==
Nigeria	99–77	Central African Republic
Morocco	62–76	Algeria
Cameroon	61–80	Tunisia

== Final standings ==
Rank	Team	Record
1	Angola	6-0
2	Senegal	4-2
3	Egypt	5-1
4	Mali	3-4
5	Nigeria	4-2
6	Central African Republic	2-3
7	Tunisia	2-3
8	Cameroon	2-4
9	Algeria	2-4
10	Morocco	0-5
11	Ivory Coast	1-4

== Awards ==
1992 FIBA Africa Championship winners

Angola
Second title

Most Valuable Player
