= Mário Palma =

Portuguese basketball coach (born 1950)

Personal information
- Born: 27 June 1950 (age 76) Portuguese Guinea
- Coaching career: 1980–present

Career history

Coaching
- 1980: Angola
- 1992–1996: Benfica
- 1997–1998: Estrelas da Avenida
- 1998–2006: Primeiro de Agosto; Angola
- 2009–2011: Jordan
- 2011–2012: Primeiro de Agosto; Portugal
- 2015–2016: Club Africain
- 2016–2019: Tunisia
- 2021: Al Ahly
- 2023–: Tunisia
Medals
Men's basketball
Representing Angola
AfroBasket
Gold medal – first place	Luanda 1999
Gold medal – first place	Casablanca 2001
Gold medal – first place	Alexandria 2003
Gold medal – first place	Algiers 2005
Representing Tunisia
AfroBasket
Gold medal – first place	Rades 2017

Mário Leonel Faria Borges de Palma (born 27 June 1950) is a Portuguese basketball coach.

== Career ==
Palma was the coach of Angola at their first appearance at the FIBA Africa Championship, in 1980, finishing in seventh place.

He later would be the coach of Benfica, leading the Portuguese squad to a golden era, where they won five titles at the Portuguese Championship and the Cup of Portugal. They also reached the final group of the European Champions Cup for the first time in 1993/94.

Palma returned to the Angolan squad, where he won three titles in a row at the FIBA Africa Championship editions of 1999, 2001 and 2003. He was also the Angolan coach at the 2000 Summer Olympics and 2004 Summer Olympics.

After leaving the Angola side, he went to coach Clube Desportivo Primeiro de Agosto, where he won the national championship title, and Palma Aqua Mágica, in Spain. In his most recent position, he led the Jordan national basketball team to the bronze medal at the FIBA Asia Championship 2009, earning the nation its first FIBA World Championship berth.

In March 2011, he was nominated head coach of Portugal.

On 3 May 2021 Palma was appointed head coach of Egyptian club Al Ahly for the remainder of the season.

== See also ==
- List of FIBA AfroBasket winning head coaches
