= AfroBasket 2009 squads =

2009 FIBA Africa Championship squads

These are the team rosters of the 16 teams competing in the FIBA Africa Championship 2009.

== Group A ==
=== Ivory Coast ===
Head coach: (Switzerland) Randoald Dessarzin

| # | Pos | Name | Club | Date of birth | Height |
|---|---|---|---|---|---|
| 4 | G | Pape-Philippe Amagou | (Greece) Kavala | February 27, 1985 (age 24) | 185 |
| 5 | G | Errick Craven | (France) Stade Clermontois BA | April 7, 1983 (age 26) | 188 |
| 6 | G-F | Charles-Noe Abouo | (United States) Brigham Young University | April 11, 1989 (age 20) | 196 |
| 7 | G | Issife Soumahoro | (France) Strasbourg IG | October 31, 1988 (age 20) | 196 |
| 8 | G | Kinidinnin Konate | (Ivory Coast) Abidjan BC | August 23, 1980 (age 28) | 188 |
| 9 | G | Mouloukou Diabate | (France) JDA Dijon | July 21, 1987 (age 22) | 180 |
| 10 | F | Ismael N'Diaye | (United States) Florida International University | April 20, 1982 (age 27) | 198 |
| 11 | G-F | Wilfrid Aka | (France) Paris-Levallois Basket | June 16, 1979 (age 30) | 193 |
| 12 | F | Jonathan Kale | (United States) Providence College | October 18, 1985 (age 23) | 203 |
| 13 | F | Didier Eric Tape | (France) Stade Rodez Aveyron | October 25, 1981 (age 27) | 198 |
| 14 | F | Namori Meite | (France) Paris-Levallois Basket | February 25, 1988 (age 21) | 196 |
| 15 | F-C | Mohamed Kone | (France) Chorale Roanne | March 24, 1981 (age 28) | 211 |

=== Libya ===
Head coach: (Serbia) Neven Filip-Luetic

| # | Pos | Name | Club | Date of birth | Height |
|---|---|---|---|---|---|
| 4 | F-C | Raed Elhamali | (United Arab Emirates) AlWasl Club | August 8, 1979 (age 29) | 204 |
| 5 | | Mohamed Youssef | (Libya) Al-Nasr Benghazi | January 10, 1986 (age 23) |
| 6 | | Mohamed Mrsal | (Libya) | January 1, 1978 (age 31) |
| 7 | F-C | Hesham Ali Salem | (Venezuela) La Guaira BBC | May 13, 1981 (age 28) | 206 |
| 8 | | Mohamed Abulkhir | (Libya) Al Ittihad | April 3, 1987 (age 22) |
| 9 | | Khaled Matrud | | September 11, 1989 (age 19) |
| 10 | | Yahia Shakmak | (Libya) Al-Nasr Benghazi | January 1, 1985 (age 24) |
| 12 | | Alamien Yagoub | (Libya) | January 3, 1981 (age 28) |
| 13 | | Mohamed Youssef Ben Elhaj | (Libya) | July 25, 1985 (age 24) |
| 14 | | Wajdi Dawo | (Libya) | October 29, 1988 (age 20) |
| 15 | G-F | Alfath Belgasem | (United States) Bakersfield Jam | February 4, 1980 (age 29) | 197 |

=== Nigeria ===
Head coach: (United States) John Lucas

| # | Pos | Name | Club | Date of birth | Height |
|---|---|---|---|---|---|
| 4 | C | Akin Akingbala | (France) SLUC Nancy | March 25, 1983 (age 25) | 208 |
| 5 | SF | Aloysius Anagonye | (Italy) Sigma Coatings Montegranaro | February 10, 1981 (age 28) | 205 |
| 6 | SG | Chamberlain Oguchi | (United States) Illinois State University | April 28, 1986 (age 23) | 196 |
| 7 | C | Deji Akindele | (Italy) Scavolini-Spar Pesaro | April 2, 1983 (age 26) | 216 |
| 8 | PG | Michael Efevberha | (New Zealand) Wellington Saints | August 22, 1984 (age 24) | 196 |
| 9 | PG | Michael Umeh | (Germany) Giessen 46ers | September 18, 1984 (age 24) | 188 |
| 10 | SG | Josh Akognon | (United States) Cal State Fullerton | February 10, 1986 (age 22) | 189 |
| 11 | SG | Ebi Ere | (Belgium) Liege | August 2, 1985 (age 23) | 196 |
| 12 | SF | Ejike Ugboaja | (Iran) Azad University Tehran | May 28, 1981 (age 24) | 203 |
| 13 | SF | Gabe Muoneke | (France) ASVEL Villeurbanne | February 7, 1978 (age 31) | 200 |
| 14 | SG | Jayson Obazuaye | (England) Milton Keynes Lions | July 27, 1984 (age 25) | 188 |
| 15 | C | Benson Egemonye | (United States) Niagara University | March 30, 1983 (age 26) | 208 |

=== South Africa ===
Head coach: (South Africa) Flosh Ngwenya

| # | Pos | Name | Club | Date of birth | Height |
|---|---|---|---|---|---|
| 4 | F | Quintin Denyssen | (South Africa) Egoli Magic | August 27, 1980 (age 28) | 200 |
| 5 | G | Nhlanhla Dlamini | (South Africa) Vaal University | February 9, 1986 (age 23) | 153 |
| 6 | F | Nyakallo Nthuping | (South Africa) Vaal University | January 14, 1980 (age 29) | 195 |
| 7 | G | Fusi Mazibuko | (South Africa) Egoli Magic | February 3, 1980 (age 29) | 180 |
| 8 | G | Kenneth Motaung | (South Africa) Egoli Magic | September 13, 1978 (age 30) | 193 |
| 9 | F | Thabang Kgwedi | (South Africa) Vaal University | April 15, 1978 (age 31) | 198 |
| 10 | F | Christopher Gabriel | (United States) University of San Diego | December 19, 1988 (age 20) | 220 |
| 11 | F | Lindokuhle Sibankulu | (South Africa) A.P.N. Durban | April 9, 1981 (age 28) | 199 |
| 12 | G–F | Neo Mothiba | (Mozambique) APN | March 21, 1982 (age 27) | 199 |
| 13 | C | Cedrick Kalombo Lukanda | (United States) Clayton State University | February 6, 1983 (age 26) | 203 |
| 14 | C | Tshilidzi Nephawe | (South Africa) Soweto Panthers | June 10, 1989 (age 20) | 208 |
| 15 | G–F | Kegorapetse Letsebe | (South Africa) Soweto Panthers | October 14, 1980 (age 28) | 198 |

== Group B ==
=== Angola ===
Head coach: (Portugal) Luis Magalhaes

| # | Pos | Name | Club | Date of birth | Height |
|---|---|---|---|---|---|
| 4 | SG | Olimpio Cipriano | (Angola) Primero de Agosto | April 9, 1982 (age 27) | 194 |
| 5 | PG | Armando Costa | (Angola) Primero de Agosto | June 3, 1983 (age 26) | 187 |
| 6 | SF | Carlos Morais | (Angola) Atlético Petróleos Luanda | October 16, 1985 (age 23) | 192 |
| 7 | PG | Domingos Bonifacio | (Angola) Recreat. Libolo | October 28, 1984 (age 24) | 186 |
| 8 | SF | Luis Costa | (Angola) Recreat. Libolo | June 7, 1978 (age 31) | 194 |
| 9 | F | Leonel Paulo | (Angola) Recreat. Libolo | April 30, 1986 (age 23) | 197 |
| 10 | C | Joaquim Gomes | (Angola) Primero de Agosto | December 23, 1980 (age 29) | 200 |
| 11 | SF | Adolfo Quimbamba | (Angola) ASA | December 26, 1982 (age 26) | 197 |
| 12 | PF | Felizardo Ambrosio | (Angola) Primero de Agosto | December 25, 1987 (age 21) | 202 |
| 13 | SF | Carlos Almeida | (Angola) Primero de Agosto | September 24, 1976 (age 32) | 192 |
| 14 | SF | Filipe Abraao | (Angola) ASA | December 31, 1979 (age 29) | 194 |
| 15 | C | Eduardo Mingas | (Angola) Primero de Agosto | January 29, 1979 (age 30) | 198 |

=== Egypt ===
Head coach: (Serbia) Zeljko Zecevic

| # | Pos | Name | Club | Date of birth | Height |
|---|---|---|---|---|---|
| 4 | PG | Tamer Moustafa | (Egypt) El Geish | July 5, 1982 (age 27) | 187 |
| 5 | SG | Mostafa Meshaal | (Egypt) Al Gezeera | March 11, 1986 (age 23) | 199 |
| 6 | C | Ramy Gunady | (Egypt) Al Gezeera | December 20, 1981 (age 27) | 184 |
| 7 | SG | Wael Badr | (Egypt) Al Gezeera | February 1, 1978 (age 30) | 192 |
| 8 | G | Haytham Darwish | (Egypt) Al Zamalek | September 8, 1975 (age 33) | 190 |
| 9 | G | Amir Fanan | (Egypt) El-Ittihad El-Iskandary | October 28, 1980 (age 28) | 190 |
| 10 | C | Mostafa Mohamed Essam | (Egypt) Al Ahly | November 14, 1987 (age 21) | 205 |
| 11 | F-C | Haytham Kamal | (Egypt) El-Ittihad El-Iskandary | November 17, 1987 (age 21) | 207 |
| 12 | SG | Amro Sherif | (Egypt) Al Gezeera | June 14, 1991 (age 18) | 193 |
| 13 | C | Mohamed Khorshid | (Egypt) Sporting Alexandria | September 18, 1985 (age 23) | 205 |
| 14 | F | Rami Ibrahim | (Egypt) El-Ittihad El-Iskandary | February 6, 1988 (age 21) | 201 |
| 15 | C | Mohamed Adly | (Egypt) Al Ahly | June 17, 1987 (age 22) | 214 |

=== Mali ===
Head coach: (France) Hugues Occansey

| # | Pos | Name | Club | Date of birth | Height |
|---|---|---|---|---|---|
| 4 | G | Modibo Niakate | (Czech Republic) BK Prostějov | March 26, 1981 (age 28) | 185 |
| 5 | F | Amara Sy | (Greece) AEK Athens | August 28, 1981 (age 27) | 202 |
| 6 | G | Nare Keita | (France) Châlons-sur-Saône | May 13, 1990 (age 19) | 183 |
| 7 | G-F | Ba Sekou Diallo | (Mali) AS Real Bamako | August 29, 1986 (age 22) | 191 |
| 8 | SF | Waly Coulibaly | (United States) The Patterson School | February 10, 1988 (age 21) | 193 |
| 9 | G | Ludovic Chelle | (France) JL Bourg-en-Bresse | January 3, 1983 (age 26) | 185 |
| 10 | F | Sambou Traore | (France) Stade Clermontois BA | November 25, 1979 (age 29) | 200 |
| 11 | C | Soumaila Samake | (China) Jilin Northeast Tigers | March 18, 1978 (age 31) | 215 |
| 12 | G | Amadou Diop | (France) Denain ASC Voltaire | January 21, 1986 (age 23) | 182 |
| 13 | F | Karim Ouattara | (France) Stade Clermontois BA | October 13, 1979 (age 29) | 200 |
| 14 | C | Nouha Diakite | (Spain) CB Illescas | December 20, 1980 (age 28) | 207 |
| 15 | F-C | Modibo Diarra | (Tunisia) Club Africain | September 16, 1980 (age 29) | 208 |

=== Mozambique ===
Head coach: (Mozambique) Carlos Alberto Niquice

| # | Pos | Name | Club | Date of birth | Height |
|---|---|---|---|---|---|
| 4 | G | Fernando Mandlate | (Mozambique) Maxaquene Maputo | August 11, 1985 (age 23) | 191 |
| 5 | G | Augusto Matos | (Mozambique) Desportivo Maputo | November 29, 1990 (age 18) | 186 |
| 6 | G | Luis Barros | (Mozambique) Costa do Sol Maputo | March 17, 1986 (age 23) | 188 |
| 7 | G | Andre Quicimusso | (Mozambique) Ferroviario Beira | January 10, 1982 (age 27) | 185 |
| 8 | G | Gerson Novela | (Mozambique) Ferroviario Maputo | September 12, 1979 (age 29) | 188 |
| 9 | G | Siade Da Costa Cossa | (Mozambique) Maxaquene Maputo | February 6, 1977 (age 32) | 186 |
| 10 | F | David Canivete Junior | (Mozambique) Desportivo Maputo | August 9, 1989 (age 19) | 193 |
| 11 | C | Custodio Muchate | (Mozambique) Ferroviario Maputo | May 6, 1982 (age 27) | 200 |
| 12 | C | Octavio Magolico | (Mozambique) Ferroviario Maputo | October 4, 1984 (age 24) | 200 |
| 13 | F | Jeronimo Bispo | (Mozambique) Ferroviario Maputo | May 4, 1985 (age 24) |
| 14 | F | Samir Adam | (Spain) Fundacion Adepal Alcazar | December 5, 1983 (age 25) | 193 |
| 15 | F | Sete Muianga | (Mozambique) Maxaquene Maputo | July 16, 1979 (age 30) | 200 |

== Group C ==
=== Cameroon ===
Head coach: (Cameroon) Lazare Adingono

| # | Pos | Name | Club | Date of birth | Height |
|---|---|---|---|---|---|
| 4 | G | Christian Bayang | (Cameroon) BEAC Yaounde | May 7, 1987 (age 22) | 192 |
| 5 | SG | Cyrille Makanda | (Cyprus) APOEL | May 5, 1980 (age 29) | 195 |
| 6 | G | Parfait Bitee | (Belgium) Passe-Partout Leuven | July 23, 1985 (age 24) | 188 |
| 7 | F | Yves Mekongo Mbala | (United States) La Salle University | July 25, 1987 (age 22) | 201 |
| 8 | PF | Harding Ngueyep Nana | (Spain) Beirasar Rosalía | January 17, 1981 (age 28) | 203 |
| 9 | G | Joachim Ekanga Ehawa | (France) Paris-Levallois Basket | October 7, 1977 (age 31) | 187 |
| 10 | G | Patrick Bouli | (United States) Manhattan College | January 11, 1986 (age 23) | 188 |
| 11 | PF | Alexis Wangmene | (United States) University of Texas | March 1, 1989 (age 20) | 203 |
| 12 | PF | Brice Vounang | (France) Étendard de Brest | December 3, 1982 (age 26) | 203 |
| 13 | C | Ruben Boumtje B. | (Germany) EWE Baskets Oldenburg | May 20, 1978 (age 31) | 212 |
| 14 | F | Gaston Essengue | (Netherlands) World Class Aviation Academy Giants | October 10, 1983 (age 25) | 203 |
| 15 | C | Alfred Aboya | (United States) UCLA | January 2, 1985 (age 24) | 203 |

=== Central African Republic ===
Head coach: (Central African Republic) Eugene Pehoua-Pelema

| # | Pos | Name | Club | Date of birth | Height |
|---|---|---|---|---|---|
| 4 | G | Fabrice Mokoteemapa | (Angola) Inter-Clube de Luanda | April 9, 1981 (age 28) | 192 |
| 5 | F | Régis Koundjia | (United States) Vermont Frost Heaves | November 8, 1983 (age 25) | 203 |
| 6 | G | Destin Damachoua | (United States) University of New Orleans | August 17, 1986 (age 22) | 185 |
| 7 | F | François Pehoua | (United States) Hampton University | November 8, 1983 (age 25) | 196 |
| 8 | G | Lionel Bomayako | (France) Quimper UJAP | September 15, 1978 (age 30) | 196 |
| 9 | F | William Kossangue-Toro | (United States) Campbell University | May 9, 1986 (age 23) | 198 |
| 10 | G | Romain Sato | (Italy) Montepaschi Siena | March 2, 1981 (age 28) | 194 |
| 11 | F | Yannick Zachee | (France) Fos Ouest Provence Basket | October 29, 1986 (age 22) | 194 |
| 12 | C | Olivier Vivies | (France) Saint Chamond Basket | April 9, 1973 (age 36) | 205 |
| 13 | F | Max Kougere | (France) Olympique Antibes | March 12, 1987 (age 22) | 198 |
| 14 | F | Max Mombollet | (France) Orcines | January 17, 1981 (age 28) | 203 |
| 15 | F/C | Jimmy Djimrabaye | (Central African Republic) Hit Trésor | April 8, 1992 (age 17) | 202 |

=== Congo ===
Head coach: (Republic of the Congo) Maxime Mbochi

| # | Pos | Name | Club | Date of birth | Height |
|---|---|---|---|---|---|
| 4 | | Noel Ndinga | | December 25, 1981 (age 27) |
| 5 | | Uther Moukimou | | October 28, 1992 (age 16) |
| 6 | | Jean Koumba | | April 15, 1983 (age 26) |
| 7 | | Bertrand Boukinda Dibessa | | March 6, 1981 (age 28) |
| 8 | | Hervé Assoua-Wande | (Morocco) Cercle Municipal Casablanca | February 16, 1982 (age 27) |
| 9 | | Luc Tselan Tsiene Etou | | April 6, 1992 (age 17) |
| 10 | | Ghislan Elenga | (Republic of the Congo) InterClub Brazzaville | November 30, 1979 (age 29) |
| 11 | | Romaric Kondzy | (Republic of the Congo) InterClub Brazzaville | December 12, 1980 (age 28) |
| 12 | G | Meryl N'Sangou N'Gampo | | August 12, 1988 (age 20) | 188 |
| 13 | | Desmar Pandi-Koumba | | May 12, 1992 (age 17) |
| 14 | G | Teddy Okobo Itoua | (South Africa) Tshwane Suns | April 29, 1979 (age 30) |
| 15 | F | Christ Silas Djio | | December 12, 1988 (age 20) | 192 |

=== Senegal ===
Head coach: (Senegal) Abdourahmane N'Diaye

| # | Pos | Name | Club | Date of birth | Height |
|---|---|---|---|---|---|
| 4 | G | Ibrahima Mbengue | (Senegal) US Rail | October 11, 1986 (age 22) | 203 |
| 5 | PG | El Kabir Pene | (France) JA Vichy | December 18, 1984 (age 24) | 190 |
| 6 | C | DeSagana Diop | (United States) Charlotte Bobcats | January 30, 1982 (age 27) | 213 |
| 7 | G | Babacar Cisse | (France) Fos Ouest Provence Basket | December 2, 1975 (age 33) | 188 |
| 8 | G | Cheikhou Thioune | (France) Rouen | November 15, 1983 (age 25) | 194 |
| 9 | SF | Maleye Ndoye | (France) Le Mans | August 19, 1980 (age 28) | 203 |
| 10 | F | Antoine Mendy | (France) Pau-Orthez | August 16, 1983 (age 25) | 198 |
| 11 | F | Mouhammad Faye | (United States) Southern Methodist University | September 14, 1985 (age 23) | 206 |
| 12 | C | Boniface Ndong | (Spain) Regal FC Barcelona | September 3, 1977 (age 31) | 213 |
| 13 | F | Boubacar Coly | (Saudi Arabia) Al-Ansar | July 11, 1983 (age 26) | 208 |
| 14 | F | Pape Sow | (Italy) Armani Jeans Milano | November 21, 1981 (age 27) | 206 |
| 15 | PF | Malick Badiane | (United States) Springfield Arsenal | January 1, 1984 (age 25) | 211 |

== Group D ==
=== Cape Verde ===
Head coach: (Nigeria) Nwora Alexander

| # | Pos | Name | Club | Date of birth | Height |
|---|---|---|---|---|---|
| 4 | G | Jeff Xavier | (United States) Providence College | September 7, 1985 (age 23) | 187 |
| 5 | F | Pedro Cipriano | (Sweden) Nornnoping | February 7, 1983 (age 26) | 205 |
| 6 | G | Ivan Almeida | (Cape Verde) Seven Stars | May 10, 1989 (age 20) | 194 |
| 7 | PG | Fidel Mendoca | (Portugal) Queluz | July 7, 1984 (age 25) | 188 |
| 8 | G | Mario Correia | (Angola) Promade Cabinda | March 17, 1978 (age 31) | 189 |
| 9 | F | Joel Almeida | (Cape Verde) Seven Stars | October 11, 1985 (age 23) | 187 |
| 10 | F | Marques Houtman | (Angola) Primero de Agosto | August 18, 1979 (age 29) | 186 |
| 12 | SF | Mario Neves | (Portugal) Cabo Madeira | October 11, 1977 (age 31) | 188 |
| 13 | F | Denis de Pina | (Portugal) Seixal | March 11, 1978 (age 31) | 196 |
| 14 | C | Abdlai Andrade Faty | (Angola) Desp. De Huila | January 14, 1985 (age 24) | 206 |
| 15 | F | Rodrigo Mascarenhas | (Angola) Primero de Agosto | March 24, 1980 (age 29) | 196 |

=== Morocco ===
Head coach: (France) Frances Jordane

| # | Pos | Name | Club | Date of birth | Height |
|---|---|---|---|---|---|
| 4 | C | Abderrahim Najah | (Morocco) RCA | November 20, 1984 (age 24) | 200 |
| 5 | C | Reda Rhalimi | (Morocco) ASS | February 2, 1982 (age 27) | 208 |
| 6 | SG | Sophian Rafai | (France) Juvisy | December 16, 1986 (age 22) | 193 |
| 7 | G | Zakaria El Masbahi | (Morocco) ASS | March 29, 1979 (age 30) | 188 |
| 8 | PG | Zouheir Bourouis | (Morocco) ASS | August 6, 1983 (age 25) | 179 |
| 9 | F | Walid Dahmani | (Morocco) WAC | September 21, 1987 (age 21) | 190 |
| 10 | C | Yunss Akinocho | (Denmark) Copenhagen sisu | March 11, 1987 (age 22) | 202 |
| 11 | F | Abdelhakim Zouita | (Morocco) ASS | August 12, 1986 (age 22) | 201 |
| 12 | F | Mohammed Houari | (Morocco) MAS | January 26, 1977 (age 32) | 198 |
| 13 | PF | Abdelmajid Naji | (France) Chalon-sur-Saône | February 9, 1989 (age 20) | 207 |
| 14 | G | Mohamad Hachad | (France) Rouen | July 22, 1983 (age 26) | 196 |
| 15 | C | Younes Idrissi | (Morocco) IR Tanger | April 13, 1984 (age 25) | 205 |

=== Rwanda ===
Head coach: (Croatia) Veceslav Kavedzija

| # | Pos | Name | Club | Date of birth | Height |
|---|---|---|---|---|---|
| 4 | | Kami Kabangu | | July 2, 1984 (age 25) |
| 5 | | Amandin Rutayisire | | June 15, 1985 (age 24) |
| 6 | | Ellis Kayijuka | | April 30, 1981 (age 28) |
| 7 | | Ntumba Buzangu | | November 5, 1982 (age 26) |
| 8 | | Aime Nkusi | | December 12, 1983 (age 25) |
| 9 | | Albert Rukundo | | May 3, 1985 (age 24) |
| 10 | | Hamza Ruhezamihigo | | March 27, 1985 (age 24) |
| 11 | C | Robert Thomson | (Romania) CS Gaz Metan Mediaş | January 28, 1982 (age 27) | 206 |
| 12 | | Kenny Gasana | | November 9, 1984 (age 24) |
| 13 | | Carlos Mugabo | | August 12, 1986 (age 22) |
| 14 | G | Matthew Miller | | December 11, 1982 (age 26) | 182 |
| 15 | | Cameroun Bradley | | February 27, 1991 (age 18) |

=== Tunisia ===
Head coach: (Tunisia) Adel Tlatli

| # | Pos | Name | Club | Date of birth | Height |
|---|---|---|---|---|---|
| 4 | C | Mokhtar Ghyaza | (Tunisia) Ezzahra Rades | November 15, 1986 (age 22) | 203 |
| 5 | G | Marouen Lahmar | (Tunisia) Club Africain | February 7, 1982 (age 27) | 180 |
| 6 | G | Nizar Knioua | (Tunisia) Stade Nabeulien | June 8, 1983 (age 26) | 188 |
| 7 | F | Naim Dhifallah | (Tunisia) Club Africain | April 12, 1982 (age 27) | 196 |
| 8 | G | Marouan Kechrid | (Morocco) IR Tanger | June 2, 1981 (age 28) | 176 |
| 9 | SF | Mohamed Hdidane | (Tunisia) Stade Nabeulien | April 27, 1986 (age 23) | 206 |
| 10 | F | Atef Maoua | (Tunisia) J.S. Kairouan | January 28, 1981 (age 28) | 199 |
| 11 | PF | Makrem Ben Romdhane | (Tunisia) Étoile du Sahel | March 27, 1989 (age 20) | 204 |
| 12 | SG | Anis Hedidane | (Tunisia) Stade Nabeulien | November 9, 1986 (age 22) | 196 |
| 13 | SG | Amine Rzig | (Egypt) El Geish | August 25, 1980 (age 29) | 198 |
| 14 | C | Hamdi Braa | (Tunisia) Étoile du Sahel | September 7, 1986 (age 22) | 203 |
| 15 | C | Salah Mejri | (Tunisia) Étoile du Sahel | June 15, 1986 (age 23) | 216 |

== See also ==
- 2009 FIBA Africa Clubs Champions Cup squads
