= 2001 FIBA Africa Championship squads =

This article displays the rosters for the participating teams at the 2001 FIBA Africa Championship.

== Algeria ==
Algeria national basketball team – 2001 FIBA Africa Championship – Silver Medal roster
Players
Coaches

Pos.	No.	Name	Age – Date of birth	Height	Club	Ctr.
F		Abdelaziz Rebahi	23 – 2 November 1977	1.95 m (6 ft 5 in)
F		Abdelhalim Sayah	25 – 23 August 1975	2.00 m (6 ft 7 in)
G		Ali Benhocine	24 – 16 November 1976	1.78 m (5 ft 10 in)
PG		Ali Bouziane	24 – 25 March 1977	1.93 m (6 ft 4 in)	Gravelines	(France)
G		Fardjallah Harouni	–	1.80 m (5 ft 11 in)
C		Lahouari Brahimi	20 – 12 January 1981	2.03 m (6 ft 8 in)
PF		Mourad Boughedir	24 – 1 October 1976	1.98 m (6 ft 6 in)	Golbey-Épinal	(France)
C		Nadjem Ouali	30 – 28 February 1971	2.05 m (6 ft 9 in)
G		Samir Mehenaoui	36 – 21 August 1964	1.98 m (6 ft 6 in)
G		Sofiane Boulaya	28 – 20 March 1973	1.80 m (5 ft 11 in)
C		Tarek Oukid	21 – 13 December 1979	2.05 m (6 ft 9 in)
G		Youcef Ouldyassia	27 – 3 May 1974	1.94 m (6 ft 4 in)	Genève	(Switzerland)

Head coach

- Faïd Bilal

Assistant coach

Legend

- (C) Team captain
- Club field describes current club

== Angola ==
Angola national basketball team – 2001 FIBA Africa Championship – Gold Medal roster
Players
Coaches

Pos.	No.	Name	Age – Date of birth	Height	Club	Ctr.
C	4	Victor Muzadi	23 – 22 June 1978	2.01 m (6 ft 7 in)	Primeiro de Agosto	(Angola)
PG	5	Walter Costa	28 – 25 March 1973	1.85 m (6 ft 1 in)	Primeiro de Agosto	(Angola)
PF	6	Ângelo Victoriano	33 – 8 February 1968	1.96 m (6 ft 5 in)	Primeiro de Agosto	(Angola)
SF	7	Gerson Monteiro	28 – 12 July 1973	1.90 m (6 ft 3 in)	Ovarense	(Portugal)
PF	8	Edmar Victoriano	25 – 1 November 1975	1.95 m (6 ft 5 in)	Petro Atlético	(Angola)
C	9	Buila Katiavala	25 – 13 May 1976	2.06 m (6 ft 9 in)	Primeiro de Agosto	(Angola)
PF	10	José Nascimento	22 – 1 January 1979	1.96 m (6 ft 5 in)	Primeiro de Agosto	(Angola)
SF	11	Mário Belarmino	26 – 22 September 1974	1.96 m (6 ft 5 in)	Petro Atlético	(Angola)
F/C	12	David Dias	32 – 21 April 1969	1.99 m (6 ft 6 in)	Barreirense Basket	(Portugal)
SG	13	Carlos Almeida	24 – 24 September 1976	1.93 m (6 ft 4 in)	Petro Atlético	(Angola)
PG	14	Miguel Lutonda	29 – 24 December 1971	1.86 m (6 ft 1 in)	Primeiro de Agosto	(Angola)
F/C	15	Jean-Jacques	37 – 3 April 1964	1.98 m (6 ft 6 in)	Portugal Telecom	(Portugal)

Head coach

- (Portugal) Mário Palma

Assistant coach

Legend

- (C) Team captain
- Club field describes current club

== Central African Republic ==
Central African Republic national basketball team – 2001 FIBA Africa Championship – 9th place roster
Players
Coaches

Pos.	No.	Name	Age – Date of birth	Height	Club	Ctr.
G		Alban Moundy	23 – 10 May 1978	1.94 m (6 ft 4 in)
G		Frédéric Bengue	29 – 17 February 1972	1.87 m (6 ft 2 in)
C		Jean Mageot	31 – 3 July 1970	2.05 m (6 ft 9 in)
G		Guy Kodjo-Sitchi	16 – 20 July 1985	1.91 m (6 ft 3 in)
G		Maehuin Kahgaba	–	1.83 m (6 ft 0 in)
G		Martial Gotagni	22 – 2 May 1979	1.89 m (6 ft 2 in)
C		Max Mombollet	20 – 17 January 1981	2.03 m (6 ft 8 in)
F		Régis Koundjia	17 – 9 November 1983	2.00 m (6 ft 7 in)
SG		Romain Sato	20 – 2 March 1981	1.95 m (6 ft 5 in)
G		Salomon Sami	23 – 21 October 1977	1.90 m (6 ft 3 in)
F		Stephane Larnna	–	1.98 m (6 ft 6 in)
G		Ulrich Kossekpa	18 – 26 November 1982	1.94 m (6 ft 4 in)

Head coach

- (Central African Republic) Jean-Robert Madozein

Assistant coach

Legend

- (C) Team captain
- Club field describes current club

== Egypt ==
Egypt national basketball team – 2001 FIBA Africa Championship – Bronze Medal roster
Players
Coaches

Pos.	No.	Name	Age – Date of birth	Height	Club	Ctr.
	4	Islam Ibrahim	22 – 10 December 1978
F	5	El-Hosany Ahmed	25 – 15 March 1976	1.93 m (6 ft 4 in)
C	6	Samir Gouda	29 – 3 May 1972	2.18 m (7 ft 2 in)
G	7	Wael El Sayed	22 – 1 December 1978	1.93 m (6 ft 4 in)
G	8	Haytham Darwish	25 – 8 September 1975	1.91 m (6 ft 3 in)
C	9	Tarek El-Ghannam	22 – 6 October 1978	2.12 m (6 ft 11 in)
F	10	Ismail Ahmed	24 – 23 September 1976	2.01 m (6 ft 7 in)
C	11	Kedar Hendawy	26 – 5 May 1975	2.06 m (6 ft 9 in)
G	12	Osama El-Sayed	–	1.83 m (6 ft 0 in)
F	13	Ahmed El-Gazar	–	1.96 m (6 ft 5 in)
G	14	Sherif Gunaidi	–	1.86 m (6 ft 1 in)
F	15	Ibrahim El-Adawy	–	2.04 m (6 ft 8 in)

Head coach

- Adel Sabri

Assistant coach

Legend

- (C) Team captain
- Club field describes current club

== Ivory Coast ==
Ivory Coast national basketball team – 2001 FIBA Africa Championship – 8th place roster
Players
Coaches

Pos.	No.	Name	Age – Date of birth	Height	Club	Ctr.
C		Abdoulaye Diaby	21 – 29 January 1980	2.06 m (6 ft 9 in)
G		Aboud-Ramann Bakayoko	31 – 18 July 1970	1.87 m (6 ft 2 in)
C		Amara Diomande	–	2.10 m (6 ft 11 in)
G		Aristide Yao	21 – 14 May 1980	1.90 m (6 ft 3 in)
G		Blaise Amalabian	27 – 3 February 1974	1.90 m (6 ft 3 in)
G		Guy Serge Touali	27 – 29 April 1974	1.82 m (6 ft 0 in)
G		Khoviessou Kouassi	24 – 24 March 1977	1.90 m (6 ft 3 in)
F		Lody Kouame	–	1.97 m (6 ft 6 in)
F		Louis-Niamke Angora	32 – 25 August 1968	1.98 m (6 ft 6 in)
G		Michel Lasme	18 – 14 December 1982	1.83 m (6 ft 0 in)
C		Morlaye Bangoura	22 – 18 February 1979	2.06 m (6 ft 9 in)
F		Moudjib Konan	–	1.97 m (6 ft 6 in)

Head coach

- (Ivory Coast) Djadji Clément

Assistant coach

Legend

- (C) Team captain
- Club field describes current club

== Mali ==
Mali national basketball team – 2001 FIBA Africa Championship – 11th place roster
Players
Coaches

Pos.	No.	Name	Age – Date of birth	Height	Club	Ctr.
SF		Amara Sy	19 – 28 August 1981	2.00 m (6 ft 7 in)	ASVEL Villeurbanne	(France)
C		Hassana Touré	21 – 30 July 1980	2.05 m (6 ft 9 in)
G		Kaba Kante	–	1.84 m (6 ft 0 in)
C		Lamine Diawara	30 – 22 January 1971	2.07 m (6 ft 9 in)
F		Lassana Sylla	23 – 28 August 1977	1.95 m (6 ft 5 in)
PG		Modibo Niakate	20 – 26 March 1981	1.82 m (6 ft 0 in)	Hutchinson CC	(United States)
G		Namory Diarra	20 – 22 March 1981	1.79 m (5 ft 10 in)
C		Nouha Diakité	20 – 20 December 1980	2.05 m (6 ft 9 in)	Barton County CC	(United States)
F		Ibrahima Sory Sy	–	1.98 m (6 ft 6 in)
C		Saliou-Binet Telly	24 – 8 April 1977	2.03 m (6 ft 8 in)	AU Eagles	(United States)
PF		Sambou Traoré	21 – 25 November 1979	1.98 m (6 ft 6 in)	Antibes	(France)
G		Sory Diakite	29 – 6 February 1972	1.85 m (6 ft 1 in)

Head coach

- (Mali) Alkaya Touré

Assistant coach

Legend

- (C) Team captain
- Club field describes current club

== Morocco ==
Morocco national basketball team – 2001 FIBA Africa Championship – 6th place roster
Players
Coaches

Pos.	No.	Name	Age – Date of birth	Height	Club	Ctr.
F		Ahmed Kajaj	–	1.94 m (6 ft 4 in)	FUS de Rabat	(Morocco)
C		Jad M'Tarfi	–	2.01 m (6 ft 7 in)	Mas Fez	(Morocco)
F		Kamal Lichtaf	28 – 14 January 1973	1.98 m (6 ft 6 in)	Raja Casablanca	(Morocco)
G		Karim Layadi	–	1.90 m (6 ft 3 in)	Wydad Casablanca	(Morocco)
G		Miloud Dahine	31 – 29 October 1969	1.78 m (5 ft 10 in)
F		Mohammed Bassim	24 – 26 January 1977	1.98 m (6 ft 6 in)	Mas Fez	(Morocco)
G		Mohammed Mouak	23 – 22 March 1978	1.89 m (6 ft 2 in)	FUS de Rabat	(Morocco)
G		Mohieddine Tahassi	–	1.95 m (6 ft 5 in)	Mas Fez	(Morocco)
C		Mounir Bouhelal	22 – 1 January 1979	2.07 m (6 ft 9 in)	Raja Casablanca	(Morocco)
G		Mourad Fenjaoui	–	1.82 m (6 ft 0 in)	Raja Casablanca	(Morocco)
G		Noureddine Sekour	–	1.93 m (6 ft 4 in)
G		Redouane Bouzidi	–	1.89 m (6 ft 2 in)	TSC Casablanca	(Morocco)

Head coach

- (Spain) Moncho Monsalve

Assistant coach

Legend

- (C) Team captain
- Club field describes current club

== Mozambique ==
Mozambique national basketball team – 2001 FIBA Africa Championship – 10th place roster
Players
Coaches

Pos.	No.	Name	Age – Date of birth	Height	Club	Ctr.
G		Abel Tembe	–	1.94 m (6 ft 4 in)		(United States)
G		Acácio Chipepo	–	1.87 m (6 ft 2 in)		(United States)
PG		Amarildo Matos	16 – 12 March 1985	1.83 m (6 ft 0 in)	Maxaquene	(Mozambique)
F		Benjamin Manhanga	29 – 2 June 1972	2.02 m (6 ft 8 in)	Desportivo de Maputo	(Mozambique)
C		Cornélio Guibunda	16 – 25 September 1984	2.03 m (6 ft 8 in)	Greenwich High School	(United States)
G		Guilherme Cabral	22 – 11 August 1979	1.89 m (6 ft 2 in)	Académica de Maputo	(Mozambique)
G		Khaimane de Deus	24 – 3 March 1977	1.88 m (6 ft 2 in)	Costa do Sol	(Mozambique)
F		Mauro Matai	19 – 25 June 1982	1.94 m (6 ft 4 in)	Académica de Maputo	(Mozambique)
G		Manvil Ferro	–	1.88 m (6 ft 2 in)		(United States)
F		Samuel Manhanga	18 – 4 July 1983	1.98 m (6 ft 6 in)	Greenwich High School	(United States)
F		Seté Muianga	22 – 16 July 1979	2.01 m (6 ft 7 in)	Académica de Maputo	(Mozambique)
G		Victor Tamele	24 – 17 April 1977	1.93 m (6 ft 4 in)	Maxaquene	(Mozambique)

Head coach

- (Mozambique) Inácio Bernardo

Assistant coach

Legend

- (C) Team captain
- Club field describes current club

== Nigeria ==
Nigeria national basketball team – 2001 FIBA Africa Championship – 5th place roster
Players
Coaches

Pos.	No.	Name	Age – Date of birth	Height	Club	Ctr.
G		Abdulrahman Mohammed	24 – 27 June 1977	1.90 m (6 ft 3 in)
G		Churchill Odia	15 – 21 November 1985	1.98 m (6 ft 6 in)
G		Adesola Alayande	17 – 25 May 1984	1.78 m (5 ft 10 in)
F		Femi Ibikunle	17 – 22 April 1984	2.06 m (6 ft 9 in)
G		Kadri Baba Jibril	21 – 18 January 1980	1.84 m (6 ft 0 in)
G		Mohammed Acha	28 – 21 July 1973	1.98 m (6 ft 6 in)
C		Julius Nwosu	30 – 5 January 1971	2.07 m (6 ft 9 in)
G		Ogoh Odaudu	20 – 3 August 1981	1.85 m (6 ft 1 in)
G		Olasunkanmi Fakeye	24 – 3 March 1977	1.90 m (6 ft 3 in)
C		Olumide Oyedeji	20 – 11 May 1981	2.10 m (6 ft 11 in)
F		Tajudeen Soyoye	24 – 12 December 1976	2.06 m (6 ft 9 in)
SF		Tunji Awojobi	28 – 30 July 1973	1.98 m (6 ft 6 in)

Head coach

- (Nigeria) Ayo Bakare

Assistant coach

Legend

- (C) Team captain
- Club field describes current club

== Senegal ==
Senegal national basketball team – 2001 FIBA Africa Championship – 7th place roster
Players
Coaches

Pos.	No.	Name	Age – Date of birth	Height	Club	Ctr.
C		Assane Ndiaye	32 – 26 February 1969	2.12 m (6 ft 11 in)
PG		Babacar Cissé	25 – 2 December 1975	1.88 m (6 ft 2 in)
C		DeSagana Diop	19 – 30 January 1982	2.13 m (7 ft 0 in)
G		Doudou Diallo	21 – 23 March 1980	1.95 m (6 ft 5 in)
G		Mamadou Diouf	23 – 17 August 1977	1.98 m (6 ft 6 in)
C		Mamadou N'Diaye	26 – 16 June 1975	2.12 m (6 ft 11 in)
G		Mouhamadou Sow	32 – 7 September 1968	1.90 m (6 ft 3 in)
C		Ndongo Ndiaye	24 – 13 April 1977	2.14 m (7 ft 0 in)
G		Oumar Mar	26 – 5 February 1975	1.81 m (5 ft 11 in)
G		Raymond Carvalho	32 – 26 July 1969	1.87 m (6 ft 2 in)
G		Samba Niang	27 – 15 October 1973	1.75 m (5 ft 9 in)
C		Souleymane Camara	22 – 23 July 1979	2.11 m (6 ft 11 in)

Head coach

- (Senegal) Moustapha Gaye

Assistant coach

Legend

- (C) Team captain
- Club field describes current club

== South Africa ==
South Africa national basketball team – 2001 FIBA Africa Championship – 12th place roster
Players
Coaches

Pos.	No.	Name	Age – Date of birth	Height	Club	Ctr.
F		Craig Gilchrist	31 – 16 April 1970	2.00 m (6 ft 7 in)
C		Christoph Trauernicht	25 – 28 July 1976	2.09 m (6 ft 10 in)
C		David Uniacke	–	2.08 m (6 ft 10 in)
G		Emmanuel Madonda	20 – 7 October 1980	1.80 m (5 ft 11 in)
G		Fusi Mazibuko	21 – 3 February 1980	1.92 m (6 ft 4 in)
C		Lebo Maepa	17 – 26 November 1983	2.04 m (6 ft 8 in)	Durban High School	(South Africa)
F		Lesego Molebatsi	19 – 11 July 1982	2.01 m (6 ft 7 in)	Wits University	(South Africa)
G		Mokoena Maxima	–	1.89 m (6 ft 2 in)
F		Paul Jesinskis	20 – 24 February 1981	2.00 m (6 ft 7 in)
C		Quintin Denyssen	20 – 27 August 1980	2.03 m (6 ft 8 in)
G		Sifiso Ngcobo	23 – 6 February 1978	1.89 m (6 ft 2 in)
G		Vincent Ntunja	20 – 24 June 1981	1.84 m (6 ft 0 in)

Head coach

- (Bosnia and Herzegovina) Zoran Zupcevic

Assistant coach

Legend

- (C) Team captain
- Club field describes current club

== Tunisia ==
Tunisia national basketball team – 2001 FIBA Africa Championship – 4th place roster
Players
Coaches

Pos.	No.	Name	Age – Date of birth	Height	Club	Ctr.
F		Ali El Amri	21 – 1 March 1980	1.99 m (6 ft 6 in)
SF		Atef Maoua	20 – 28 January 1981	1.99 m (6 ft 6 in)
F		Heithem Sayed	25 – 17 January 1976	2.01 m (6 ft 7 in)
C		Habib El Ouaer	–	2.04 m (6 ft 8 in)
F		Issam Ben Douissa	21 – 15 May 1980	2.02 m (6 ft 8 in)
G		Lamjad Njah	–	1.85 m (6 ft 1 in)
G		Madji Boulaabi	21 – 1 March 1980	1.90 m (6 ft 3 in)
C		Mejdi Maalaoui	23 – 23 August 1977	2.02 m (6 ft 8 in)
F		Mourad Ben Hassine	–	2.00 m (6 ft 7 in)
F		Oualid Bouslama	22 – 6 March 1979	1.98 m (6 ft 6 in)
G		Souheil Kechrid	23 – 10 March 1978	1.87 m (6 ft 2 in)
F		Walid Braiki	–	2.00 m (6 ft 7 in)

Head coach

- (Tunisia) Adel Tlatli

Assistant coach

Legend

- (C) Team captain
- Club field describes current club

== See also ==
- 2000 FIBA Africa Clubs Champions Cup squads
