= 2005 FIBA Africa Championship =

Tournament details
- Host country: Algeria
- Dates: 15–24 August
- Teams: 12
- Venues: 2 (in 2 host cities)

Final positions
- Champions: Angola (8th title)
- Runners-up: Senegal
- Third place: Nigeria
- Fourth place: Algeria

Tournament statistics
- MVP: (Senegal) Boniface Ndong
- Top scorer: (Tunisia) Radhouane Slimane (14.8 points per game)

The 2005 FIBA Africa Championship was the 23rd FIBA Africa Championship, played under the rules of FIBA, the world governing body for basketball, and the FIBA Africa thereof. The tournament was hosted by Algeria from August 15 to 24 2005 and took place at the Salle Omnisports La Coupole.

Angola defeated Senegal 70–61 in the final to win their eighth title. and securing a spot at the 2008 Summer Olympics.

== Draw ==
Group A	Group B
Algeria; Gabon; Ivory Coast; Mali; Nigeria; Tunisia	Angola; Central African Republic; Morocco; Mozambique; South Africa; Senegal

== Preliminary round ==
Times given below are in UTC+1.

=== Group A ===
Qualified for the quarter-finals

Team	W	L	PF	PA	Diff	Pts.
Algeria	4	1	374	337	+37	9
Nigeria	4	1	386	328	+58	9
Tunisia	2	3	355	357	-2	7
Mali	2	3	382	376	+6	7
Ivory Coast	2	3	328	375	-47	7
Gabon	1	4	315	367	-52	6

15 August 2005
14:00

Boxscore

Mali	61–80	Tunisia
Scoring by quarter: 20-24, 20-25, 4-15, 17-16
Pts: Amara Sy 16; Rebs: three players 5 Asts: Niakate 3		Pts: Slimane 27; Rebs: Slimane 8 Asts: El Amri, Ferjani 3

Algiers

15 August 2005
16:30

Boxscore

Nigeria	87–56	Ivory Coast
Scoring by quarter: 15-13, 25-10, 23-16, 24-17
Pts: Oguchi 21; Rebs: Oyedeji 10; Asts: Badmus 5		Pts: Lebrun 15; Rebs: Amalabian 4 Asts: four players 1

Algiers

15 August 2005
21:00

Boxscore

Algeria	80–52	Gabon
Scoring by quarter: 19-6, 18-16, 18-18, 25-12
Pts: Bouziane 19; Rebs: Sayah 8 Asts: Boughedir 5		Pts: Lasme 11; Rebs: Lasme 15; Asts: Mbourounda 2

Algiers

16 August 2005
16:00

Boxscore

Gabon	65–74	Ivory Coast
Scoring by quarter: 16-18, 10-17, 17-24, 22-15
Pts: Ndong 12; Rebs: Lasme 6 Asts: Redombina 3		Pts: Lebrun 19; Rebs: three players 7 Asts: three players 2

Algiers

16 August 2005
18:30

Boxscore

Mali	77–83	Nigeria
Scoring by quarter: 18-21, 26-22, 16-21, 17-19
Pts: Niakate 23; Rebs: Cissé 7 Asts: Amara Sy 4		Pts: Awojobi 26; Rebs: Ibekwe 9 Asts: Badmus 4

Algiers

16 August 2005
21:00

Boxscore

Algeria	84–72	Tunisia
Scoring by quarter: 27-16, 20-19, 18-18, 19-19
Pts: Bouziane 20; Rebs: Oukid 8 Asts: Boulaya 6		Pts: Slimane 23; Rebs: Slimane 9 Asts: Slimane, El Amri 2

Algiers

18 August 2005
16:00

Boxscore

Mali	74–76	Gabon
Scoring by quarter: 22-15, 10-21, 25-19, 17-21
Pts: Diawara 16; Rebs: Diawara 14; Asts: Sylla 4		Pts: Nollet, Boussougou 17; Rebs: three players 5 Asts: Boussougou 4

Algiers

18 August 2005
18:30

Boxscore

Tunisia	65–78	Nigeria
Scoring by quarter: 12-29, 22-21, 14-11, 17-17
Pts: Kechrid 24; Rebs: Maalaoui 8 Asts: Kechrid 4		Pts: Awojobi 14; Rebs: Oyedeji 7 Asts: Udoka 3

Algiers

18 August 2005
21:00

Boxscore

Algeria	71–58	Ivory Coast
Scoring by quarter: 21-18, 20-15, 17-10, 13-15
Pts: Sayah 14; Rebs: Haif, Djellali 7 Asts: Harrouni 4		Pts: Lebrun 12; Rebs: Lebrun 7 Asts: S.Konaté 5

Algiers

19 August 2005
16:00

Boxscore

Ivory Coast	71–87	Mali
Scoring by quarter: 10-21, 21-16, 17-16, 23-24
Pts: Touali 15; Rebs: Lebrun, Yao 7 Asts: Touali 5		Pts: Diawara 24; Rebs: Amara Sy, Sani 8 Asts: Sylla 4

Algiers

19 August 2005
18:30

Boxscore

Tunisia	73–65	Gabon
Scoring by quarter: 20-11, 17-16, 21-28, 15-10
Pts: El Amri 15; Rebs: El Amri 7 Asts: Lahmar 3		Pts: Mbourounda 24; Rebs: Lasme, Bitang 8 Asts: Nollet 3

Algiers

19 August 2005
21:00

Boxscore

Algeria	73–72	Nigeria
Scoring by quarter: 20-16, 21-19, 14-17, 18-20
Pts: Bouziane, Sayah 14; Rebs: Haif 7 Asts: Bouziane, Harrouni 4		Pts: Muoneke 18; Rebs: Oyedeji 9 Asts: three players 2

Algiers

20 August 2005
16:00

Boxscore

Nigeria	66–57	Gabon
Scoring by quarter: 12-17, 16-17, 26-8, 12-15
Pts: Oyedeji 22; Rebs: Ibekwe 8 Asts: Awojobi, Badmus 3		Pts: Lasme 16; Rebs: Lasme 12; Asts: Nollet 2

Algiers

20 August 2005
18:30

Boxscore

Ivory Coast	69–65	Tunisia
Scoring by quarter: 18-9, 18-17, 19-13, 14-26
Pts: Touali 28; Rebs: Lebrun 7 Asts: Amalabian 3		Pts: Dhifallah 17; Rebs: Slimane 13; Asts: Ferjani 5

Algiers

20 August 2005
21:00

Boxscore

Algeria	66–83	Mali
Scoring by quarter: 18-18, 11-25, 11-22, 26-18
Pts: Sayah 13; Rebs: Haif 6 Asts: Atamna 5		Pts: Traore 19; Rebs: Samake 7 Asts: Amara Sy 4

Algiers

=== Group B ===
Qualified for the quarter-finals

Team	W	L	PF	PA	Diff	Pts.
Angola	5	0	426	227	+199	9
Senegal	4	1	343	261	+82	9
Central African Rep.	3	2	279	291	-12	7
Morocco	2	3	288	330	-42	7
South Africa	1	4	292	384	-92	7
Mozambique	0	5	258	393	-135	6

15 August 2005
10:00

Boxscore

South Africa	42–107	Angola
Scoring by quarter: 13-25, 11-24, 5-34, 13-24
Pts: Madonda 9 Rebs: Nthuping, Gilchrist 7 Asts: Madonda, Nthuping 2		Pts: Olímpio 20; Rebs: Kikas 11; Asts: Gerson 6

Staouéli

15 August 2005
12:30

Boxscore

Morocco	60–70	Senegal
Scoring by quarter: 14-19, 14-11, 23-22, 9-18
Pts: Masbahi, Bouhelal 17; Rebs: Bakkas 10; Asts: Mouak 3		Pts: Ndong 25; Rebs: Ndong 11; Asts: Cisse, Ndoye 3

Staouéli

15 August 2005
14:00

Boxscore

Mozambique	50–65	Central African Rep.
Scoring by quarter: 5-10, 15-24, 13-13, 17-18
Pts: Cabral 11; Rebs: Mazive 8 Asts: four players 2		Pts: Koundjia 18; Rebs: Mombollet 13; Asts: Pehoua 3

Staouéli

16 August 2005
16:00

Boxscore

South Africa	65–66	Central African Rep.
Scoring by quarter: 19-17, 21-21, 13-18, 12-10
Pts: Mazibuko, Ngobeni 19; Rebs: Mazibuko 6 Asts: Engelbrecht 3		Pts: Koundjia 13; Rebs: Pehoua 9 Asts: three players 2

Staouéli

16 August 2005
18:30

Boxscore

Morocco	69–65	Mozambique
Scoring by quarter: 19-13, 19-18, 14-22, 17-12
Pts: Masbahi 23; Rebs: Bassim 7 Asts: Khalfi 5		Pts: Khaimane 17; Rebs: Muchate 11; Asts: Tamele 3

Staouéli

16 August 2005
21:00

Boxscore

Angola	67–59	Senegal
Scoring by quarter: 20-15, 18-14, 18-19, 11-11
Pts: Lutonda 12; Rebs: Olímpio 7 Asts: Olímpio 6		Pts: Ndong 21; Rebs: Ndong 8 Asts: Cisse 4

Staouéli

18 August 2005
16:00

Boxscore

South Africa	60–67	Morocco
Scoring by quarter: 18-24, 15-18, 16-12, 11-13
Pts: Molebatsi 13; Rebs: Molebatsi, Ngobeni 9 Asts: Mazibuko 4		Pts: Khalfi 18; Rebs: Mouak 7 Asts: Mouak 4

Staouéli

18 August 2005
18:30

Boxscore

Central African Rep.	46–77	Angola
Scoring by quarter: 8-14, 11-15, 10-22, 17-26
Pts: Sitchi 11; Rebs: Pehoua 6 Asts: Damachoua 4		Pts: Kikas 18; Rebs: Mingas 7 Asts: Armando 5

Staouéli

18 August 2005
21:00

Boxscore

Senegal	79–47	Mozambique
Scoring by quarter: 21-13, 19-11, 16-7, 23-16
Pts: Aw 14; Rebs: Wane 9 Asts: Pene 8		Pts: Khaimane 12; Rebs: Muianga 4 Asts: Muchate, Cabral 2

Staouéli

19 August 2005
16:00

Boxscore

Senegal	85–45	South Africa
Scoring by quarter: 21-12, 20-21, 23-5, 21-7
Pts: Ndoye, Cisse 17; Rebs: Ndoye, Ndong 7 Asts: Ndiaye 6		Pts: Denyssen 16; Rebs: Molebatsi 6 Asts: Engelbrecht 3

Staouéli

19 August 2005
18:30

Boxscore

Angola	100–37	Mozambique
Scoring by quarter: 29-10, 22-7, 23-8, 26-12
Pts: Gerson 16; Rebs: Abdel 7 Asts: Armando, Muzadi 5		Pts: Mandlate 12; Rebs: Muianga 7 Asts: five players 1

Staouéli

19 August 2005
21:00

Boxscore

Central African Rep.	60–49	Morocco
Scoring by quarter: 12-8, 15-10, 20-18, 13-13
Pts: Koundjia 13; Rebs: Pehoua 13; Asts: Pehoua, Gotagny 3		Pts: Bakkas 12; Rebs: Bakkas 8 Asts: three players 2

Staouéli

20 August 2005
16:00

Boxscore

Mozambique	59–80	South Africa
Scoring by quarter: 18-27, 10-12, 12-20, 19-21
Pts: Khaimane 18; Rebs: Muchate 9 Asts: Khaimane, Mandlate 3		Pts: Molebatsi 17; Rebs: Molebatsi, Mazibuko 8 Asts: Engelbrecht 7

Staouéli

20 August 2005
18:30

Boxscore

Central African Rep.	42–50	Senegal
Scoring by quarter: 9-13, 13-11, 9-8, 11-18
Pts: Koundjia 10; Rebs: Beyina 8 Asts: Koundjia 3		Pts: Ndoye 14; Rebs: Ndong 19; Asts: Aw 3

Staouéli

20 August 2005
21:00

Boxscore

Angola	75–43	Morocco
Scoring by quarter: 17-13, 25-8, 24-12, 9-10
Pts: Olímpio 15; Rebs: Abdel 8 Asts: Olímpio, Lutonda 5		Pts: Mouak 12; Rebs: Mouak 7 Asts: Mouak 5

Staouéli

== Knockout stage ==
=== 9-12th place bracket ===
Semi-finals
22 August 2005 - 13:30
Ivory Coast	77
Mozambique	64
22 August 2005 - 16:00
South Africa	71
Gabon	79

Ninth place
23 August 2005 - 16:00
Ivory Coast	65
Gabon	85
Eleventh place
23 August 2005 - 13:30
Mozambique	74
South Africa	56

=== 9-12th place ===
22 August 2005
13:30

Boxscore

Ivory Coast	77–64	Mozambique
Scoring by quarter: 16-21, 17-12, 23-16, 21-15
Pts: Dioum 18; Rebs: Touali 12; Asts: Yao 6		Pts: Muchate 15; Rebs: Mandlate 7 Asts: Mandlate 4

Staouéli

22 August 2005
16:00

Boxscore

South Africa	71–79	Gabon
Scoring by quarter: 18-11, 18-17, 13-20, 22-31
Pts: Ngobeni 15; Rebs: Ngobeni 13; Asts: Engelbrecht 4		Pts: M.Ndong 16; Rebs: Lasme 11; Asts: Nollet 7

Staouéli

=== 11th place match ===
23 August 2005
13:30

Boxscore

Mozambique	74–56	South Africa
Scoring by quarter: 27-5, 15-16, 18-14, 14-21
Pts: Octávio Magoliço 26; Rebs: Muchate 10; Asts: Mandlate, Letela 4		Pts: Molebatsi 25; Rebs: Molebatsi 11; Asts: Mazibuko 3

Staouéli

=== 9th place match ===
23 August 2005
16:00

Boxscore

Ivory Coast	65–85	Gabon
Scoring by quarter: 13-17, 8-16, 15-23, 29-29
Pts: Amalabian 19; Rebs: Touali 12; Asts: Touali 5		Pts: Lasme 24; Rebs: Lasme 16; Asts: R.Ndong 3

Staouéli

=== 5-8th place bracket ===
Semi-finals
23 August 2005 - 13:30
Morocco	83
Tunisia	72
23 August 2005 - 16:00
Mali	64
Central African Rep.	68

Fifth place
24 August 2005 - 16:00
Morocco	60
Central African Rep.	86
Seventh place
24 August 2005 - 13:30
Tunisia	89
Mali	100

=== 5-8th place ===
23 August 2005
13:30

Boxscore

Morocco	83–72	Tunisia
Scoring by quarter: 19-17, 24-20, 20-16, 20-19
Pts: Khalfi 25; Rebs: Bouhelal, Mouak 8 Asts: three players 3		Pts: Slimane 23; Rebs: Slimane 12; Asts: Ouellani 4

Algiers

23 August 2005
16:00

Boxscore

Mali	64–68	Central African Rep.
Scoring by quarter: 13-21, 14-11, 17-14, 20-22
Pts: Cissé 13; Rebs: Cissé 11; Asts: Niakate, Sylla 4		Pts: Koundjia 20; Rebs: Koundjia, Mombollet 8 Asts: Mombollet 3

Algiers

=== 7th place match ===
24 August 2005
13:30

Boxscore

Tunisia	89–100	Mali
Scoring by quarter: 21-24, 11-28, 30-25, 27-23
Pts: Khenfir 22; Rebs: Bouslama 6 Asts: Bouslama 5		Pts: Niakate 19; Rebs: Diakité 11; Asts: Niakate, Diakité 3

Algiers

=== 5th place match ===
24 August 2005
16:00

Boxscore

Morocco	60–86	Central African Rep.
Scoring by quarter: 17-19, 18-12, 13-26, 12-29
Pts: three players 10; Rebs: Bouhelal 7 Asts: Masbahi 3		Pts: Gotagny 18; Rebs: Mombollet 11; Asts: Koundjia 3

Algiers

=== Championship bracket ===
Quarter-finals
22 August 2005 - 18:30
Mali	50
Angola	67
22 August 2005 - 13:30
Central African Rep.	51
Nigeria	63
22 August 2005 - 16:00
Tunisia	67
Senegal	72
22 August 2005 - 21:00
Morocco	66
Algeria	81

Semi-finals
23 August 2005 - 18:30
Angola	67
Nigeria	62
23 August 2005 - 21:00
Algeria	48
Senegal	80

Final
24 August 2005 - 18:30
Senegal	61
Angola	70
Third place
24 August 2005 - 21:00
Algeria	76
Nigeria	88

=== Quarterfinals ===
22 August 2005
21:00

Boxscore

Morocco	66–81	Algeria
Scoring by quarter: 15-11, 18-25, 18-25, 15-20
Pts: Khalfi 17; Rebs: Bouhelal 8 Asts: Mouak 3		Pts: Canon 31; Rebs: Oukid 9 Asts: Atamna 4

Algiers

22 August 2005
18:30

Boxscore

Mali	50–67	Angola
Scoring by quarter: 14-15, 6-19, 7-21, 23-12
Pts: Diawara 10; Rebs: Diawara 5 Asts: three players 2		Pts: Mingas 13; Rebs: Kikas 7 Asts: three players 2

Algiers

22 August 2005
13:30

Boxscore

Central African Rep.	51–63	Nigeria
Scoring by quarter: 10-22, 11-10, 11-17, 19-14
Pts: Gotagny 14; Rebs: Gotagny, Mombollet 6 Asts: Beyina 2		Pts: Udoka 17; Rebs: Udoka 9 Asts: Ogwudire 5

Algiers

22 August 2005
16:00

Boxscore

Tunisia	67–72	Senegal
Scoring by quarter: 15-21, 13-20, 15-12, 24-19
Pts: Dhifallah 19; Rebs: Dhifallah 7 Asts: Ferjani 2		Pts: B.Ndong 19; Rebs: B.Ndong 12; Asts: Cisse 9

Algiers

=== Semifinals ===
23 August 2005
18:30

Boxscore

Angola	67–62	Nigeria
Scoring by quarter: 13-11, 18-16, 21-18, 15-17
Pts: Lutonda 17; Rebs: Abdel 8 Asts: C.Almeida 6		Pts: Udoka 23; Rebs: three players 6 Asts: Ogwudire 2

Algiers

23 August 2005
21:00

Boxscore

Algeria	48–80	Senegal
Scoring by quarter: 12-25, 10-12, 9-23, 17-20
Pts: Boulaya 12; Rebs: Oukid, Benramdane 6 Asts: three players 2		Pts: B.Ndong 25; Rebs: B.Ndong, Badiane 9 Asts: Cisse 4

Algiers

=== Bronze medal match ===
24 August 2005
18:30

Boxscore

Algeria	76–88	Nigeria
Scoring by quarter: 19-18, 15-27, 21-25, 21-18
Pts: Oukid 23; Rebs: Oukid 13; Asts: Boulaya 7		Pts: Udoka 24; Rebs: Oyedeji 9 Asts: Udoka 7

Algiers

=== Final ===
24 August 2005
21:00

Boxscore

Senegal	61–70	Angola
Scoring by quarter: 11-19, 17-15, 13-24, 20-12
Pts: Cisse 18; Rebs: three players 5 Asts: Cisse 4		Pts: Olímpio 22; Rebs: Armando 8 Asts: Armando 5

Algiers

== Final standings ==
Qualified for the 2006 World Championship

Rank	Team	Record
Gold medal	Angola	8–0
Silver medal	Senegal	6–2
Bronze medal	Nigeria	6–2
4	Algeria	5–3
5	Central African Rep.	5–3
6	Morocco	3–5
7	Mali	3–5
8	Tunisia	2–6
9	Gabon	3–4
10	Ivory Coast	3–4
11	Mozambique	1–6
12	South Africa	1–6

1st	2nd	3rd
Angola Abdel Bouckar; Ângelo Victoriano; Armando Costa; Carlos Almeida; Carlos Morais; Eduardo Mingas; Joaquim Gomes; Miguel Lutonda; Mílton Barros; Olímpio Cipriano; Vladimir Ricardino; Victor Muzadi; Coach: Mário Palma	Senegal Alpha Traore; Babacar Cisse; Boniface Ndong; El Kabir Pene; Issa Konare; Jules Aw; Makhtar Ndiaye; Maleye Ndoye; Malick Badiane; Sidy Faye; Souleymane Camara; Souleymane Wane; Coach: Abdourahmane N'Diaye	Nigeria Abe Badmus; Abdulrahman Mohammed; Chamberlain Oguchi; Ekene Ibekwe; Gabe Muoneke; Ime Udoka; Jeff Varem; Julius Nwosu; Kingsley Ogwudire; Ndubuisi Eze; Olumide Oyedeji; Tunji Awojobi; Coach: Scott Nnaji

== Awards ==
2005 FIBA Africa Championship winners

Angola
Eighth title

Most Valuable Player
(Senegal) Boniface Ndong

=== All-Tournament Team ===
- (Angola) Miguel Lutonda
- (Angola) Olímpio Cipriano
- (Nigeria) Ime Udoka
- (Algeria) Abdelhalim Sayah
- (Senegal) Boniface Ndong

== Statistical Leaders ==
=== Individual Tournament Highs ===
Points

Rank	Name	G	Pts	PPG
1	(Tunisia) Radhouane Slimane	8	118	14.8
2	(Senegal) Boniface Ndong	8	117	14.6
3	(Nigeria) Ime Udoka	8	110	13.8
4	(Mali) Amara Sy	7	95	13.6
5	(Ivory Coast) Jean-Emmanuel Lebrun	5	68	13.6
6	(Algeria) Abdelhalim Sayah	8	105	13.1
6	(Central African Republic) Régis Koundjia	8	105	13.1
8	(Senegal) Maleye N'Doye	8	104	13
8	(Mali) Modibo Niakate	8	104	13
10	(Morocco) Zakaria El Masbahi	7	90	12.9

Rebounds

Rank	Name	G	Rbs	RPG
1	(Gabon) Yann Lasme	7	71	10.1
2	(Senegal) Boniface Ndong	8	73	9.1
3	(Tunisia) Radhouane Slimane	8	62	7.8
4	(Central African Republic) Maixant Mombollet	8	56	7
5	(Mozambique) Custódio Muchate	7	49	7
6	(Angola) Abdel Bouckar	8	55	6.9
6	(Nigeria) Olumide Oyedeji	8	55	6.9
8	(Central African Republic) Lionel Pehoua	8	54	6.8
9	(Senegal) Malick Badiane	7	47	6.7
9	(South Africa) Lesego Molebatsi	7	47	6.7

Assists

Rank	Name	G	Ast	APG
1	(Senegal) Babacar Cisse	8	32	4
2	(Angola) Olímpio Cipriano	8	25	3.1
3	(Algeria) Sofiane Boulaya	8	24	3
3	(Angola) Armando Costa	8	24	3
5	(South Africa) Patrick Engelbrecht	7	20	2.9
6	(Morocco) Mohammed Mouak	8	21	2.6
6	(Nigeria) Ime Udoka	8	21	2.6
8	(Gabon) Serbe Nollet	7	18	2.6
9	(Nigeria) Abe Badmus	8	20	2.5
9	(Algeria) Ferdjellah Harrouni	8	20	2.5

Steals

Rank	Name	G	Stl	SPG
1	(Morocco) Mustapha Khalfi	7	19	2.7
2	(Algeria) Karim Atamna	8	19	2.4
3	(Ivory Coast) Guy Touali	7	16	2.3
4	(Morocco) Mohammed Mouak	8	17	2.1
5	(Gabon) Serbe Nollet	7	15	2.1
6	(Angola) Olímpio Cipriano	8	16	2
6	(Nigeria) Ime Udoka	8	16	2
8	(Algeria) Amine Benramdane	8	15	1.9
8	(Central African Republic) Régis Koundjia	8	15	1.9
10	(Mozambique) Custódio Muchate	7	13	1.9

Blocks

Rank	Name	G	Blk	BPG
1	(Gabon) Yann Lasme	7	21	3
2	(Morocco) Nabil Bakkas	8	12	1.5
2	(Senegal) Boniface Ndong	8	12	1.5
4	(Angola) Abdel Bouckar	8	9	1.1
5	(Senegal) Malick Badiane	7	7	1
5	(Mali) Ousmane Cissé	7	7	1
7	(Morocco) Mounir Bouhelal	8	7	0.9
7	(Nigeria) Ekene Ibekwe	8	7	0.9
9	(Central African Republic) Souleymane Asrangue	8	6	0.8
10	(Mali) Lamine Diawara	8	5	0.6

Minutes

Rank	Name	G	Min	MPG
1	(Morocco) Mohammed Mouak	8	274	34.3
2	(Mali) Amara Sy	7	238	34
3	(Tunisia) Ali El Amri	8	263	32.9
4	(Gabon) Serbe Nollet	7	228	32.6
5	(Ivory Coast) Guy Touali	7	222	31.7
6	(Mozambique) Custódio Muchate	7	215	30.7
7	(Mozambique) Sete Muianga	7	212	30.3
8	(Gabon) Yann Lasme	7	210	30
9	(Ivory Coast) Jean-Emmanuel Lebrun	5	148	29.6
10	(Senegal) Boniface Ndong	8	233	29.1

=== Individual Game Highs ===
Department	Name	Total	Opponent
Points	(Algeria) Djillali Canon	31	Morocco
Rebounds	(Senegal) Boniface Ndong	19	Central African Rep.
Assists	(Senegal) Babacar Cisse	9	Tunisia
Steals	(Morocco) Mustapha Khalfi	7	South Africa
Blocks	(Gabon) Yann Lasme	8	South Africa
2-point field goal percentage	(Mali) Sambou Traore	100% (7/7)	Algeria
3-point field goal percentage	(Gabon) Serbe Nollet	100% (4/4)	Ivory Coast
Free throw percentage	(Tunisia) Radhouane Slimane	100% (8/8)	Morocco
Turnovers	(Mozambique) Custódio Muchate	10	South Africa

=== Team Tournament Highs ===
Points per Game

Pos.	Name	PPG
1	Angola	78.8
2	Nigeria	74.9
3	Mali	74.5
4	Tunisia	72.9
5	Algeria	72.4
6	Senegal	69.5
7	Gabon	68.4
8	Ivory Coast	67.1
9	Morocco	62.1
10	Central African Rep.	60.5

Total Points

Pos.	Name	PPG
1	Angola	630
2	Nigeria	599
3	Mali	596
4	Tunisia	583
5	Algeria	579
6	Senegal	556
7	Morocco	497
8	Central African Republic	484
9	Gabon	479
10	Ivory Coast	470

Rebounds

Pos.	Name	RPG
1	Senegal	47.4
2	South Africa	44.1
3	Angola	43.2
4	Nigeria	41.1
5	Central African Republic	41
6	Gabon	40.6
7	Mali	38.1
8	Algeria	37.1
9	Morocco	35.9
10	Mozambique	34.9

Assists

Pos.	Name	APG
1	Angola	16
2	Algeria	14
3	Senegal	13.1
4	Nigeria	12
5	Mali	10.3
6	South Africa	10.1
7	Gabon	9.9
8	Ivory Coast	9.7
9	Tunisia	9.3
10	Mozambique	8.7

Steals

Pos.	Name	SPG
1	Algeria	11.4
2	Angola	11.1
3	Morocco	11
4	Mozambique	10.6
5	Central African Republic	10.1
6	Nigeria	9.5
7	Senegal	9.4
8	Ivory Coast	9.3
9	Gabon	9.3
10	Mali	6.9

Blocks

Pos.	Name	BPG
1	Gabon	4.4
2	Senegal	4
3	Morocco	3.5
4	Mali	3.4
5	Angola	3
6	Central African Republic	2.6
7	Nigeria	2.5
8	Mozambique	2.3
9	Ivory Coast	2.1
10	Tunisia	1.5

2-point field goal percentage

Pos.	Name	%
1	Mali	53.5
2	Angola	52.2
3	Nigeria	50.3
4	Senegal	47.4
5	Morocco	47
6	Tunisia	46.4
7	Algeria	45.1
8	Ivory Coast	41
9	Central African Republic	40.9
10	Gabon	40.6

3-point field goal percentage

Pos.	Name	%
1	Angola	35.2
2	Mali	34.1
3	Ivory Coast	31.5
4	Nigeria	31.1
5	Tunisia	29.5
6	Gabon	29.2
7	Senegal	28.9
8	Algeria	26.3
9	Mozambique	26.3
10	South Africa	23.4

Free throw percentage

Pos.	Name	%
1	Tunisia	67.6
2	Algeria	66.1
3	Senegal	64.7
4	Ivory Coast	63
5	Nigeria	62.8
6	South Africa	62.7
7	Angola	60.8
8	Central African Republic	59.6
9	Mali	58.6
10	Gabon	57.4

=== Team Game highs ===
Department	Name	Total	Opponent
Points	Angola	107	South Africa
Rebounds	Central African Republic	57	Mozambique
Assists	Angola	24	Mozambique
Steals	Morocco	17	Tunisia
Blocks	Gabon	11	South Africa
2-point field goal percentage	Angola	83.8% (31/37)	Mozambique
3-point field goal percentage	Gabon; Nigeria	50% (11/22)	Ivory Coast
Free throw percentage	South Africa	89.5% (17/19)	Central African Rep.
Turnovers	Nigeria	36	Gabon

== See also ==
- 2005 FIBA Africa Clubs Champions Cup
