= 2003 FIBA Africa Championship squads =

This article displays the rosters for the participating teams at the 2003 FIBA Africa Championship.

== Algeria ==
Algeria national basketball team – 2003 FIBA Africa Championship – 7th place roster
Players
Coaches

Pos.	No.	Name	Age – Date of birth	Height	Club	Ctr.
G		Sofiane Boulaya	30 – 20 March 1973	1.80 m (5 ft 11 in)
G		Ali Benhocine	26 – 16 November 1976	1.78 m (5 ft 10 in)
G		Fathi Oukerimi	23 – 15 August 1980	1.85 m (6 ft 1 in)
G		Abdelhalim Kaouane	21 – 29 November 1981	1.80 m (5 ft 11 in)
G		Amine Benramdane	30 – 27 April 1973	1.90 m (6 ft 3 in)
G		Miloud Doubal	21 – 2 December 1981	1.89 m (6 ft 2 in)
F		Mourad Boughedir	26 – 1 October 1976	1.98 m (6 ft 6 in)
F		Abdelhalim Sayah	27 – 23 August 1975	2.00 m (6 ft 7 in)
F		Mourad Boukhalfi	–	2.02 m (6 ft 8 in)
C		Tarek Oukid	23 – 13 December 1979	2.05 m (6 ft 9 in)
C		Nadjem Ouali	32 – 28 February 1971	2.05 m (6 ft 9 in)
C		Mustapha Adrar	21 – 12 April 1982	2.02 m (6 ft 8 in)

Head coach

- Azzedine Laboulze

Assistant coach

Legend

- (C) Team captain
- Club field describes current club

== Angola ==
Angola national basketball team – 2003 FIBA Africa Championship – Gold Medal roster
Players
Coaches

Pos.	No.	Name	Age – Date of birth	Height	Club	Ctr.
SF	4	Afonso Silva	29 – 24 July 1974	1.90 m (6 ft 3 in)	Primeiro de Agosto	(Angola)
PG	5	Walter Costa	30 – 25 March 1973	1.85 m (6 ft 1 in)	Primeiro de Agosto	(Angola)
PF	6	Ângelo Victoriano	35 – 8 February 1968	1.96 m (6 ft 5 in)	Primeiro de Agosto	(Angola)
SF	7	Gerson Monteiro	30 – 12 July 1973	1.90 m (6 ft 3 in)	Barreirense Basket	(Portugal)
PF	8	Edmar Victoriano	27 – 1 November 1975	1.95 m (6 ft 5 in)	Primeiro de Agosto	(Angola)
SG	9	Víctor de Carvalho	34 – 20 February 1969	1.93 m (6 ft 4 in)	Petro Atlético	(Angola)
F/C	10	Joaquim Gomes	22 – 23 December 1980	2.00 m (6 ft 7 in)	Valparaiso Crusaders	(United States)
C	11	Victor Muzadi	25 – 22 June 1978	2.01 m (6 ft 7 in)	Primeiro de Agosto	(Angola)
C	12	Abdel Bouckar	23 – 8 April 1980	2.04 m (6 ft 8 in)	Primeiro de Agosto	(Angola)
SG	13	Carlos Almeida	26 – 24 September 1976	1.93 m (6 ft 4 in)	Primeiro de Agosto	(Angola)
PG	14	Miguel Lutonda	31 – 24 December 1971	1.86 m (6 ft 1 in)	Primeiro de Agosto	(Angola)
F/C	15	Jean-Jacques	39 – 3 April 1964	1.98 m (6 ft 6 in)	Portugal Telecom	(Portugal)

Head coach

- (Portugal) Mário Palma

Assistant coach

Legend

- (C) Team captain
- Club field describes current club

== Central African Republic ==
Central African Republic national basketball team – 2003 FIBA Africa Championship – 5th place roster
Players
Coaches

Pos.	No.	Name	Age – Date of birth	Height	Club	Ctr.
G		Frédéric Bengue	31 – 17 February 1972	1.87 m (6 ft 2 in)	Villefranche-Beaujolais	(France)
F		Régis Koundjia	19 – 9 November 1983	2.00 m (6 ft 7 in)	LSU Tigers	(United States)
F		Maurice Beyina	32 – 8 August 1971	1.98 m (6 ft 6 in)	Nancy	(France)
G		Martial Gotagni	24 – 2 May 1979	1.89 m (6 ft 2 in)	AGTTBC	(France)
G		Lionel Bomayako	24 – 15 September 1978	1.96 m (6 ft 5 in)	F.D. Knights	(United States)
G		Alban Moundy	25 – 10 May 1978	1.94 m (6 ft 4 in)	Poitiers Basket 86	(France)
SG		Romain Sato	22 – 2 March 1981	1.95 m (6 ft 5 in)	Xavier Musketeers	(United States)
F/C		Patrick Ngongba	26 – 27 November 1976	2.02 m (6 ft 8 in)	Sambo Xers	(South Korea)
G		Teddy Sokambi	24 – 19 March 1979	1.88 m (6 ft 2 in)	Angers BC 49	(France)
C		Jean Mageot	33 – 3 July 1970	2.05 m (6 ft 9 in)	Poitiers Basket 86	(France)
C		Max Mombollet	22 – 17 January 1981	2.03 m (6 ft 8 in)	The Citadel Bulldogs	(United States)
C		Souleymane Asrangue	20 – 11 November 1982	2.05 m (6 ft 9 in)	Cincinnati Bearcats	(United States)

Head coach

- (Central African Republic) Jean-Paul Rebatet

Assistant coach

- (Central African Republic) Eugène Pehoua

Legend

- (C) Team captain
- Club field describes current club

== Egypt ==
Egypt national basketball team – 2003 FIBA Africa Championship – Bronze Medal roster
Players
Coaches

Pos.	No.	Name	Age – Date of birth	Height	Club	Ctr.
G		Sherif Gunaidi	–	1.86 m (6 ft 1 in)
PG		Ramy Gunady	21 – 20 December 1981	1.84 m (6 ft 0 in)
		Ahmed Mounir	–
G		Haytham Darwish	27 – 8 September 1975	1.91 m (6 ft 3 in)
G		Wael El Sayed	24 – 1 December 1978	1.93 m (6 ft 4 in)
F		El-Hosany Ahmed	27 – 15 March 1976	1.93 m (6 ft 4 in)
G		Mohamed El-Kerdani	26 – 24 April 1977	1.95 m (6 ft 5 in)
F		Ahmed El-Gazar	–	1.96 m (6 ft 5 in)
F		Ismail Ahmed Abdelmoneim	26 – 23 September 1976	2.01 m (6 ft 7 in)	Champville	(Lebanon)
F		Ibrahim El-Adawy	–	2.04 m (6 ft 8 in)
C		Ahmed Sakr	28 – 8 March 1975	2.05 m (6 ft 9 in)
C		Samir Gouda	31 – 3 May 1972	2.18 m (7 ft 2 in)	Fenerbahçe	(Turkey)

Head coach

- Adel Sabri

Assistant coach

Legend

- (C) Team captain
- Club field describes current club

== Ivory Coast ==
Ivory Coast national basketball team – 2003 FIBA Africa Championship – 11th place roster
Players
Coaches

Pos.	No.	Name	Age – Date of birth	Height	Club	Ctr.
G		Michel Lasme	20 – 14 December 1982	1.83 m (6 ft 0 in)	UMass Minutemen	(United States)
G		Blaise Amalabian	29 – 3 February 1974	1.90 m (6 ft 3 in)
G		Aristide Yao	23 – 14 May 1980	1.90 m (6 ft 3 in)
PG		Stéphane Konaté	22 – 23 August 1980	1.93 m (6 ft 4 in)
G		Vassy Banny	17 – 8 September 1985	1.83 m (6 ft 0 in)
F		Lody Kouame	–	1.97 m (6 ft 6 in)
F		Jean-Claude Kouame	–	1.94 m (6 ft 4 in)
F/C		Mohamed Berte Bouake	19 – 8 June 1984	2.01 m (6 ft 7 in)
F		Amani Yao Afeli	22 – 19 September 1980	1.97 m (6 ft 6 in)
G		Ousmane Cisse	–	1.79 m (5 ft 10 in)
C		Arnaud Dahi	19 – 31 December 1983	2.02 m (6 ft 8 in)
G		Didier Tape	21 – 25 October 1981	1.98 m (6 ft 6 in)

Head coach

- (Ivory Coast) Olivier Tea

Assistant coach

Legend

- (C) Team captain
- Club field describes current club

== Madagascar ==
Madagascar national basketball team – 2003 FIBA Africa Championship – 12th place roster
Players
Coaches

Pos.	No.	Name	Age – Date of birth	Height	Club	Ctr.
G		Zafihita Delphis	26 – 16 March 1977	1.73 m (5 ft 8 in)	AS Jirama	(Madagascar)
G		Fetra Rakotomalala	20 – 31 March 1983	1.73 m (5 ft 8 in)	AS Jirama	(Madagascar)
G		Rafalimanana Rado	24 – 6 January 1979	1.82 m (6 ft 0 in)	CAF	(Madagascar)
G		Eric Tsaboto	21 – 17 August 1981	1.75 m (5 ft 9 in)	COSFA	(Madagascar)
F		Mohamed Ibrahim	30 – 19 October 1972	1.88 m (6 ft 2 in)	Mad Consult	(Madagascar)
G		Heidi Jackson	18 – 16 November 1984	1.83 m (6 ft 0 in)		(Madagascar)
F		Denis Saotra	26 – 8 April 1977	1.88 m (6 ft 2 in)	BCK	(Madagascar)
C		Kilobo Naguib	20 – 12 August 1983	2.02 m (6 ft 8 in)	SOE	(Madagascar)
G/F		Andriamora Jaomalala	27 – 3 June 1976	1.93 m (6 ft 4 in)	COSFA	(Madagascar)
F/C		Djianfary Jaofeno	24 – 12 August 1979	1.87 m (6 ft 2 in)	COSMOS	(Madagascar)
F		Fidelice Eugene	29 – 12 April 1974	1.90 m (6 ft 3 in)		(Madagascar)

Head coach

- (Madagascar) Olivier Ratsimisao

Assistant coach

Legend

- (C) Team captain
- Club field describes current club

== Morocco ==
Morocco national basketball team – 2003 FIBA Africa Championship – 8th place roster
Players
Coaches

Pos.	No.	Name	Age – Date of birth	Height	Club	Ctr.
G		Miloud Dahine	33 – 29 October 1969	1.78 m (5 ft 10 in)
G		Khalid Bouibi	25 – 16 November 1977	1.81 m (5 ft 11 in)
G		Zakaria El Masbahi	24 – 29 March 1979	1.92 m (6 ft 4 in)
G		Mohammed Mouak	25 – 22 March 1978	1.89 m (6 ft 2 in)
G		Redouane Bouzidi	–	1.89 m (6 ft 2 in)
F		Abdel Raho	25 – 22 April 1978	2.02 m (6 ft 8 in)
G		Younes Ait Tabassir	23 – 15 May 1980	1.83 m (6 ft 0 in)
F		Mohammed Bassim	26 – 26 January 1977	2.00 m (6 ft 7 in)
C		Nabil Bakkas	24 – 6 March 1979	2.02 m (6 ft 8 in)
C		Mounir Bouhelal	24 – 1 January 1979	2.07 m (6 ft 9 in)
F		Hicham Lakhlifi	–	2.00 m (6 ft 7 in)
C		Hicham Abdelmalek	22 – 22 September 1980	2.01 m (6 ft 7 in)

Head coach

- (United States) Sterling Wright

Assistant coach

Legend

- (C) Team captain
- Club field describes current club

== Mozambique ==
Mozambique national basketball team – 2003 FIBA Africa Championship – 10th place roster
Players
Coaches

Pos.	No.	Name	Age – Date of birth	Height	Club	Ctr.
G		Sílvio Neves	–	1.87 m (6 ft 2 in)
G		Siade Cossa	26 – 6 February 1977	1.89 m (6 ft 2 in)
		Fernando Manjate	–
G		Khaimane de Deus	26 – 3 March 1977	1.89 m (6 ft 2 in)
G		Sílvio Letela	20 – 6 December 1982	1.96 m (6 ft 5 in)
G/F		Victor Tamele	26 – 17 April 1977	1.93 m (6 ft 4 in)
F		Felisberto Macuácua	27 – 23 February 1976	1.95 m (6 ft 5 in)
		Mauro Vembane	25 – 27 February 1978
		Afzal Camal	–
F		Benjamin Manhanga	31 – 2 June 1972	2.02 m (6 ft 8 in)
F		Seté Muianga	24 – 16 July 1979	2.01 m (6 ft 7 in)
F		Abel Mubetene	–	1.96 m (6 ft 5 in)

Head coach

- (Mozambique) Inácio Bernardo

Assistant coach

Legend

- (C) Team captain
- Club field describes current club

== Nigeria ==
Nigeria national basketball team – 2003 FIBA Africa Championship – Silver Medal roster
Players
Coaches

Pos.	No.	Name	Age – Date of birth	Height	Club	Ctr.
G		Churchill Odia	17 – 21 November 1985	1.98 m (6 ft 6 in)	Ebun Comets	(Nigeria)
G		Ogoh Odaudu	22 – 3 August 1981	1.85 m (6 ft 1 in)	Oak Hills	(United States)
PG		Kingsley Ogwudire	31 – 20 January 1972	1.92 m (6 ft 4 in)	Al-Ittihad	(Syria)
G		Guy Ikpah	19 – 11 June 1984	1.83 m (6 ft 0 in)	Oklahoma Cowboys	(United States)
G		Kadri Baba Jibril	23 – 18 January 1980	1.84 m (6 ft 0 in)	Ebun Comets	(Nigeria)
G		Abdulrahman Mohammed	26 – 27 June 1977	1.90 m (6 ft 3 in)	Al-Wehdat	(Jordan)
F		Jeff Varem	20 – 16 July 1983	1.95 m (6 ft 5 in)	Washington Cougars	(United States)
SG		Solomon Tat	17 – 29 July 1986	1.96 m (6 ft 5 in)	Ebun Comets	(Nigeria)
SF		Tunji Awojobi	30 – 30 July 1973	1.98 m (6 ft 6 in)	Adirondack Wildcats	(United States)
SF		Gabe Muoneke	25 – 7 February 1978	2.00 m (6 ft 7 in)	Cangrejeros	(Puerto Rico)
C		Olumide Oyedeji	22 – 11 May 1981	2.10 m (6 ft 11 in)	Orlando Magic	(United States)
C		Ike Nwankwo	29 – 27 December 1973	2.11 m (6 ft 11 in)	Huntsville Flight	(United States)

Head coach

- (Nigeria) Ayo Bakare

Assistant coach

Legend

- (C) Team captain
- Club field describes current club

== Senegal ==
Senegal national basketball team – 2003 FIBA Africa Championship – 4th place roster
Players
Coaches

Pos.	No.	Name	Age – Date of birth	Height	Club	Ctr.
PG		Babacar Cissé	27 – 2 December 1975	1.88 m (6 ft 2 in)	JA Vichy	(France)
G		Elysée Boissy	25 – 14 June 1978		AS Forces Armées	(Senegal)
PG		El Kabir Pene	18 – 18 December 1984	1.90 m (6 ft 3 in)	US Gorée	(Senegal)
G		Madar MBaye	–	1.80 m (5 ft 11 in)	MAS Fez	(Morocco)
G		Doudou Diallo	23 – 23 March 1980	1.95 m (6 ft 5 in)
F		Maleye Ndoye	22 – 19 August 1980	2.03 m (6 ft 8 in)	Furman Paladins	(United States)
F		Issa Konare	23 – 25 January 1980	2.03 m (6 ft 8 in)	S.C. Gamecocks	(United States)
F		Pape Sow	21 – 22 November 1981	2.08 m (6 ft 10 in)	Fullerton Titans	(United States)
F		Pape Diagne	–	2.02 m (6 ft 8 in)
C		Malick Badiane	19 – 1 January 1984	2.11 m (6 ft 11 in)	TV Langen	(Germany)
C		Boniface Ndong	25 – 3 September 1977	2.13 m (7 ft 0 in)	TSK uniVersa Bamberg	(Germany)
C		Makhtar N'Diaye	29 – 12 December 1973	2.08 m (6 ft 10 in)	Chorale Roanne	(France)

Head coach

- (Senegal) Maguette Diop

Assistant coach

Legend

- (C) Team captain
- Club field describes current club

== South Africa ==
South Africa national basketball team – 2003 FIBA Africa Championship – 9th place roster
Players
Coaches

Pos.	No.	Name	Age – Date of birth	Height	Club	Ctr.
G		Emmanuel Madonda	22 – 7 October 1980	1.80 m (5 ft 11 in)
G		Buthi Mndaweni	27 – 2 January 1976	1.78 m (5 ft 10 in)
G		Fusi Mazibuko	23 – 3 February 1980	1.92 m (6 ft 4 in)	Levski Sofia	(Bulgaria)
G		Sifiso Ngcobo	25 – 6 February 1978	1.89 m (6 ft 2 in)
F		Kenneth Motaung	24 – 13 September 1978	1.93 m (6 ft 4 in)
F/C		Nyakallo Nthuping	23 – 14 January 1980	1.95 m (6 ft 5 in)
F		Floyd Mtimkulu	–	1.96 m (6 ft 5 in)
F		Craig Ngobeni	19 – 16 December 1983	1.98 m (6 ft 6 in)
F		Quintin Denyssen	22 – 27 August 1980	2.03 m (6 ft 8 in)	Wits Univ Rebels	(South Africa)
C		Thuso Moiloa	24 – 12 September 1978	1.99 m (6 ft 6 in)
F		Thabang Kgwedi	25 – 15 April 1978	1.98 m (6 ft 6 in)
F		Lesego Molebatsi	21 – 11 July 1982	2.01 m (6 ft 7 in)	Fresno City College	(United States)

Head coach

- (United States) Sam Vincent

Assistant coach

Legend

- (C) Team captain
- Club field describes current club

== Tunisia ==
Tunisia national basketball team – 2003 FIBA Africa Championship – 6th place roster
Players
Coaches

Pos.	No.	Name	Age – Date of birth	Height	Club	Ctr.
G		Maher Khenfir	33 – 22 February 1970	1.75 m (5 ft 9 in)	ES Sahel	(Tunisia)
G		Mourad El Mabrouk	16 – 19 October 1986	1.75 m (5 ft 9 in)	Ezzahra Sports	(Tunisia)
G		Amine Rzig	22 – 25 August 1980	1.98 m (6 ft 6 in)	Stade Nabeulien	(Tunisia)
F		Khaled Yahiaoui	27 – 13 October 1975	1.98 m (6 ft 6 in)	Ezzahra Sports	(Tunisia)
SF		Atef Maoua	22 – 28 January 1981	1.99 m (6 ft 6 in)	JS Kairouan	(Tunisia)
F		Ali El Amri	23 – 1 March 1980	1.99 m (6 ft 6 in)	Club Africain	(Tunisia)
F		Haitham Essayed	27 – 17 January 1976	2.01 m (6 ft 7 in)	Club Africain	(Tunisia)
F		Mourad Ben Hassine	–	2.00 m (6 ft 7 in)	EOGK Kram	(Tunisia)
F		Oualid Bouslama	24 – 6 March 1979	1.98 m (6 ft 6 in)	US Monastir	(Tunisia)
F/C		Radhouane Slimane	23 – 16 August 1980	2.06 m (6 ft 9 in)	JS Kairouan	(Tunisia)
F		Issam Ben Douissa	23 – 15 May 1980	2.02 m (6 ft 8 in)	US Monastir	(Tunisia)
C		Fouhed Stiti	20 – 10 March 1983	2.03 m (6 ft 8 in)	US Monastir	(Tunisia)

Head coach

- (Socialist Federal Republic of Yugoslavia) Marian Novović

Assistant coach

Legend

- (C) Team captain
- Club field describes current club

== See also ==
- 2002 FIBA Africa Clubs Champions Cup squads
