= Basketball at the 2000 Summer Olympics – Men's qualification =

The men's qualification for the 2000 Olympic men's basketball tournament occurred from 1998–2000; all five FIBA (International Basketball Federation) zones sent in teams.

The first qualifying tournament was the 1998 FIBA World Championship in which the champion was guaranteed of a place in the Olympics. Throughout the next two years, several regional tournaments served as qualification for the zonal tournaments, which doubles as intercontinental championships, to determine which teams were to participate in the 2000 Sydney Summer Olympics.

== Qualification ==
=== Outright qualification ===
A total of 12 teams took part in the Olympics, with each NOC sending in one team. The host nation (Australia) qualified automatically as hosts.

There are a total of 5 zonal tournaments (doubling as intercontinental championships) that determined the qualifying teams, with a total of 7 teams qualifying outright. Each zone was allocated with the following qualifying berths:

- FIBA Africa: 1 team (Champion)
- FIBA Americas: 2 teams (Champion and runner-up)
- FIBA Asia: 1 team (Champion)
- FIBA Europe: 5 teams (Top five places)
- FIBA Oceania: 1 team (Champion)

Furthermore, Yugoslavia qualified automatically by winning at the 1998 FIBA World Championship.

== Summary ==
Qualified for the Olympics outright
Qualified automatically

These are the final standings of the different Olympic qualifying tournaments. The venues are as follows:

- 1998 FIBA World Championship: Athens (Greece)
- FIBA Africa Championship 1999: Cabinda, Luanda (Angola)
- FIBA Americas Championship 1999: San Juan (Puerto Rico)
- FIBA Asia Championship 1999: Fukuoka (Japan)
- EuroBasket 1999: Antibes, Clermont-Ferrand, Dijon, Le Mans, Paris, Pau, Toulouse (France)
- FIBA Oceania Championship 1999: Auckland (New Zealand)

Rank	World	Africa	Americas	Asia	Europe	Oceania	Host
1st	(Federal Republic of Yugoslavia) FR Yugoslavia	Angola	United States	China	Italy	New Zealand	Australia
2nd	Russia	Nigeria	Canada	South Korea	Spain	Guam	
3rd	United States	Egypt	Argentina	Saudi Arabia	FR Yugoslavia		
4th	Greece	Mali	Puerto Rico	Chinese Taipei	France		
5th	Spain	Tunisia	Venezuela	Japan	Lithuania		
6th	Italy	Algeria	Brazil	Kuwait	Russia		
7th	Lithuania	Senegal	Dominican Republic	Lebanon	Germany		
8th	Argentina	Ivory Coast	Uruguay	Syria	Turkey		
9th	Australia	Cape Verde	Panama	Uzbekistan	Israel		
10th	Brazil	Mozambique	Cuba	United Arab Emirates	Slovenia		
11th	Puerto Rico	Morocco		Philippines	Croatia		
12th	Canada	South Africa		Bahrain	Czech Republic		
13th	Nigeria			Hong Kong	North Macedonia		
14th	Japan			Thailand	Hungary		
15th	Senegal			Malaysia	Bosnia and Herzegovina		
16th	South Korea				Greece		

== FIBA Africa ==
The FIBA Africa Championship 1999 at Angola determined FIBA Africa's only outright representative to the Olympics.

The tournament is structured into a preliminary round of 12 teams divided into 2 groups; the top two teams from each group advance to the knockout stages (quarterfinals, semifinals and final).

Angola won the tournament, beating Nigeria in the final, 79–72.

== FIBA Americas ==
The FIBA Americas Championship 1999 held in the Roberto Clemente Coliseum at San Juan, Puerto Rico determined the two teams representing FIBA Americas in the Olympics.

The tournament is structured into a preliminary round of ten teams divided into 2 groups; the top four teams from each group advance to a quarterfinals Round-robin tournament, where results between groupmates carry over. The top four teams advance to the semifinals, a knockout stage deciding the first four places.

The United States defeated Canada 92–66 in the final. Both teams qualified for the Olympics.

== FIBA Asia ==
The tournament held in Fukuoka, Japan is structured with a preliminary round of 15 teams divided into four groups, with the top two teams advancing to the quarterfinals, where they'll be divided into two groups. The top two teams in the quarterfinals groups advance to the knockout semifinals and finals.

China defeated Korea 63–45 in the final, earning the only Asian berth for the Olympics.

== FIBA Europe ==
European berths for the Olympic Games were decided at EuroBasket 1999, held in France.

The tournament is structured with a preliminary round of 16 teams divided into four groups, where the bottom team from each group prelims is eliminated. The remaining teams are reassigned into two 6-team groups, with results between teams that played already carried over. The top four teams from each group advance to the knockout stage to decide 1st through 4th places. The losers from the knockout stage decide 5th through 8th places in a separate bracket.

Italy defeated Spain 64-56 in the final, while FR Yugoslavia finished 74–62 against France in the bronze medal match. Lithuania defeated Russia 103-72 in the 5th place match. All six teams qualified for the Olympic Games, since FR Yugoslavia had already qualified as world champions in 1998.

== FIBA Oceania ==
With Australia being qualified as host, the only spot for Oceania in the Olympic Games was decided in a single elimination game where New Zealand defeated Guam 125–43.

== Qualified teams ==
- Angola
- Australia
- Canada
- China
- France
- Italy
- Lithuania
- New Zealand
- Russia
- Spain
- United States
- (Federal Republic of Yugoslavia) FR Yugoslavia
