= FIBA Africa Championship 1999 =

Tournament details
- Host country: Angola
- Dates: 29 July – 6 August
- Teams: 12
- Venue(s): 2 (in 2 host cities)

Final positions
- Champions: Angola (5th title)
- Runners-up: Nigeria
- Third place: Egypt
- Fourth place: Mali

Tournament statistics
- MVP: (Mali) Lamine Diawara

The FIBA Africa Championship 1999 was the 20th FIBA Africa Championship, played under the rules of FIBA, the world governing body for basketball, and the FIBA Africa thereof. The tournament was hosted by Angola from July 29 to August 6, 1999.

Angola defeated Nigeria 79–72 in the final to win their fifth title. and securing a spot at the 2000 Summer Olympics.

== Draw ==
Group A	Group B
Algeria; Cape Verde; Egypt; Mali; Morocco; Senegal	Angola; Ivory Coast; Mozambique; Nigeria; South Africa; Tunisia

== Preliminary rounds ==
Times given below are in UTC+1.

=== Group 1 ===
Qualified for the semi-finals

Team	W	L	PF	PA	Diff	Pts
Egypt	5	0	348	256	+92	10
Mali	3	2	340	345	-5	8
Algeria	3	2	325	331	-6	8
Senegal	2	3	322	320	+2	7
Cape Verde	2	3	318	320	-2	7
Morocco	0	5	265	346	-81	5

30 July 1999
10:00

Mali	79–77	Algeria

Pavilhão do Sp Cabinda, Cabinda

16:00

Cape Verde	54–57	Senegal

Pavilhão do Sp Cabinda, Cabinda

18:00

Morocco	42–73	Egypt

Pavilhão do Sp Cabinda, Cabinda

31 July 1999
10:00

Mali	60–64	Cape Verde

Pavilhão do Sp Cabinda, Cabinda

16:00

Algeria	58–35	Morocco

Pavilhão do Sp Cabinda, Cabinda

18:00

Egypt	62–53	Senegal

Pavilhão do Sp Cabinda, Cabinda

1 August 1999
10:00

Morocco	57–74	Senegal

Pavilhão do Sp Cabinda, Cabinda

16:00

Egypt	70–55	Mali

Pavilhão do Sp Cabinda, Cabinda

18:00

Algeria	72–70	Cape Verde

Pavilhão do Sp Cabinda, Cabinda

2 August 1999
10:00

Cape Verde	73–71	Morocco

Pavilhão do Sp Cabinda, Cabinda

16:00

Senegal	77–84	Mali

Pavilhão do Sp Cabinda, Cabinda

18:00

Algeria	49–83	Egypt

Pavilhão do Sp Cabinda, Cabinda

3 August 1999
10:00

Cape Verde	57–60	Egypt

Pavilhão do Sp Cabinda, Cabinda

16:00

Senegal	64–69	Algeria

Pavilhão do Sp Cabinda, Cabinda

18:00

Morocco	60–68	Mali

Pavilhão do Sp Cabinda, Cabinda

=== Group 2 ===
Qualified for the semi-finals

Team	W	L	PF	PA	Diff	Pts
Angola	5	0	430	251	+179	10
Nigeria	4	1	375	277	+98	9
Tunisia	3	2	258	255	+3	8
Ivory Coast	2	3	270	316	-46	7
Mozambique	1	4	269	387	-118	6
South Africa	0	5	245	361	-116	5

29 July 1999
19:00

Angola	85–25	South Africa

Pavilhão da Cidadela, Luanda

30 July 1999
19:00

Nigeria	71–56	Tunisia

Pavilhão da Cidadela, Luanda

4 August 1999
16:00

Ivory Coast	65–60	Mozambique

Pavilhão da Cidadela, Luanda

31 July 1999
10:00

South Africa	45–85	Nigeria

Pavilhão da Cidadela, Luanda

17:00

Tunisia	20–0	Ivory Coast

Pavilhão da Cidadela, Luanda

19:00

Mozambique	47–104	Angola

Pavilhão da Cidadela, Luanda

1 August 1999
10:00

Ivory Coast	62–58	South Africa

Pavilhão da Cidadela, Luanda

17:00

Tunisia	74–50	Mozambique

Pavilhão da Cidadela, Luanda

19:00

Nigeria	57–64	Angola

Pavilhão da Cidadela, Luanda

2 August 1999
10:00

Mozambique	69–62	South Africa

Pavilhão da Cidadela, Luanda

17:00

Angola	79–48	Tunisia

Pavilhão da Cidadela, Luanda

19:00

Ivory Coast	69–80	Nigeria

Pavilhão da Cidadela, Luanda

3 August 1999
10:00

South Africa	55–60	Tunisia

Pavilhão da Cidadela, Luanda

17:00

Mozambique	43–82	Nigeria

Pavilhão da Cidadela, Luanda

19:00

Angola	98–74	Ivory Coast

Pavilhão da Cidadela, Luanda

== Knockout stage ==
=== 5th place match ===
5 August 1999
09:00

Algeria	54–56	Tunisia
Scoring by half: 29-22, 25-34
Pts: Sayah 15		Pts: Essayed 14

Pavilhão da Cidadela, Luanda

=== 7th place match ===
5 August 1999
11:00

Senegal	87–70	Ivory Coast
Scoring by half: 40-27, 47-33

Pavilhão da Cidadela, Luanda

=== Championship bracket ===
Semi-finals
5 August - 17:00
Egypt	54
Nigeria	69
5 August - 19:00
Mali	69
Angola	77

Final
6 August - 19:00
Angola	79
Nigeria	72
Third place
6 August - 17:00
Mali	63
Egypt	75

5 August 1999
17:00

Egypt	54–69	Nigeria
Scoring by half: 27-36, 27-33
Pts: Ibrahim, Elwahab 10		Pts: Awojobi 26

Pavilhão da Cidadela, Luanda

5 August 1999
19:00

Mali	69–77	Angola
Scoring by half: 29-46, 40-31
Pts: Diwara 14		Pts: Lutonda, J.Jacques 12

Pavilhão da Cidadela, Luanda

=== 9th place match ===
6 August 1999
09:00

Cape Verde	69–65	Mozambique
Pts: V.Hugo 17		Pts: A.de Deus 13

Pavilhão da Cidadela, Luanda

=== 11th place match ===
6 August 1999
11:00

Morocco	59–42	South Africa

Pavilhão da Cidadela, Luanda

=== Bronze medal match ===
6 August 1999
17:00

Mali	63–75	Egypt

Pavilhão da Cidadela, Luanda

=== Final ===
6 August 1999
19:00

Angola	79–72	Nigeria
Scoring by quarter: 46-23, 33-49
Pts: D.Dias 34		Pts: Owinje 19

Pavilhão da Cidadela, Luanda

== Final standings ==
Qualified for the 2000 Summer Olympics

Rank	Team	Record
Gold medal	Angola	7–0
Silver medal	Nigeria	5–2
Bronze medal	Egypt	6–1
4	Mali	3–4
5	Tunisia	4–2
6	Algeria	3–3
7	Senegal	3–3
8	Ivory Coast	2–4
9	Cape Verde	3–3
10	Mozambique	1–5
11	Morocco	1–5
12	South Africa	0–6

1st	2nd	3rd
Angola Ângelo Victoriano; Aníbal Moreira; Carlos Almeida; Cristovão Swingue; David Dias; Edmar Victoriano "Baduna"; Herlander Coimbra; Jean Jacques Conceição; Joaquim Gomes "Kikas"; Justino Victoriano; Miguel Lutonda; Victor de Carvalho; Coach: Mário Palma	Nigeria Ayo Samuel; Benjamin Eze; Daniel Okonkwo; Godwin Owinje; Julius Nwosu; Kadri Jibril; Kingsley Ogwudire; Mohammed Acha; Mufo Ibrahim; Olumide Oyedeji; Tunji Awojobi; Yinka Dare; Coach: Andrew Isokpehi	Egypt Ahmed Oraby; Ahmed Sakr; Ahmed Abdel-Wahab; El-Hosany Ahmed; Haytham Hassan; Ihab El-Aziz; Islam Ibrahim; Mohamed Moteleb; Tarek El-Ghannam; Tarek Khairi; Wael El Sayed; Yasser Elwahab; Coach: Mario Blassone

== Awards ==
1999 FIBA Africa Championship winners

Angola
Fifth title

Most Valuable Player
(Mali) Lamine Diawara

== See also ==
- 1998 FIBA Africa Clubs Champions Cup
