= FIBA AfroBasket Most Valuable Player =

Award given to outstanding players

The AfroBasket Most Valuable Player Award is a FIBA award given every two years, to the Most Outstanding player throughout the tournament.

== Winners ==
Year	Player	Position	Team	Ref.
1974	Gaston Gambor	Center	Central African Republic	
1980	Mathieu Faye	Guard	Senegal	
1985	José Carlos Guimarães	Guard	Angola	
1987	Frédéric Goporo	Guard	Central African Republic	
1993	Étienne Preira	Forward	Senegal	
1997	Oumar Mar	Guard	Senegal	
1999	Lamine Diawara	Center	Mali	
2001	Miguel Lutonda	Guard	Angola	
2003	Miguel Lutonda (2)	Guard	Angola	
2005	Boniface N'Dong	Center	Senegal	
2007	Joaquim Gomes	Center	Angola	
2009	Joaquim Gomes (2)	Center	Angola	
2011	Salah Mejri	Center	Tunisia	
2013	Carlos Morais	Guard	Angola	
2015	Chamberlain Oguchi	Guard	Nigeria	
2017	Ike Diogu	Center	Nigeria	
2021	Makram Ben Romdhane	Center	Tunisia	
2025	Childe Dundão	Guard	Angola	

== See also ==
- FIBA AfroBasket All-Tournament Team
- FIBA Basketball World Cup Most Valuable Player
- FIBA Basketball World Cup All-Tournament Team
- FIBA Awards
