= Kalombo =

Kalombo is a given name. Notable people with this given name include:

- Cedrick Kalombo Lukanda (born 1983), South African basketball player
- Kalombo Mwansa (born 1955), Zambian politician
- Willy Kalombo Mwenze (born 1970), DR Congolese long-distance runner
- Kalombo N'Kongolo (1961–1993), Congolese footballer

== See also ==
- Sedrick Kalombo (born 1995), Italian footballer
