= Abdourahmane N'Diaye =

Abdourahmane N'Diaye may refer to:

- Abdourahmane N'Diaye (basketball) (born 1953), Senegalese basketball player
- Abdourahmane Ndiaye (footballer) (born 1996), Senegalese footballer
