= FIBA Africa Championship 1987 =

FIBA AfroBasket 1987
14th FIBA Africa Basketball Championship

Tournament details
- Host country: Tunisia
- Dates: December 17–27
- Teams: 9
- Venue(s): 1 (in 1 host city)

Final positions
- Champions: Central African Republic (2nd title)

Tournament statistics
- MVP: (Central African Republic) Frédéric Goporo

The FIBA Africa Championship 1987 was an international basketball tournament for teams in the International Basketball Federation's FIBA Africa zone hosted by Tunisia from December 17 to December 18, 1987. The games were played in Tunis. The top two countries in this FIBA Africa Championship earned the two berths allocated to Africa for the 1988 Summer Olympics in Seoul. Central African Republic won the tournament, the country's 2nd African championship, by beating Egypt in the final.

== Competing nations ==
The following national teams competed:

Group A	Group B
Angola; Mali; Nigeria; Tunisia	Algeria; Central African Republic; Ivory Coast; Egypt; Senegal

== Preliminary rounds ==
=== Group A ===
Team	Pts	Pld	W	L	PF	PA	Diff
Angola	6	3	3	0	237	187	+50
Mali	4	3	1	2	213	227	-14
Tunisia	4	3	1	2	214	218	-4
Nigeria	4	3	1	2	202	234	-32

Day 1

Mali	85–75	Tunisia
Tunisia	79–64	Nigeria

Day 2

Angola	81–60	Mali
Angola	69–60	Tunisia

Day 3

Nigeria	71–68	Mali
Angola	87–67	Nigeria

=== Group B ===
Team	Pts	Pld	W	L	PF	PA	Diff
Central African Republic	8	4	4	0	310	258	+52
Egypt	7	4	3	1	318	299	+19
Senegal	6	4	2	2	273	284	-11
Ivory Coast	5	4	1	3	293	298	-5
Algeria	4	4	0	4	260	315	-55

Day 1

Ivory Coast	87–63	Algeria
Egypt	76–69	Senegal

Day 2

Algeria	79–91	Egypt
Ivory Coast	68–84	Central African Republic

Day 3

Senegal	57–71	Central African Republic
Egypt	71–66	Ivory Coast

Day 4

Central African Republic	70–53	Algeria
Ivory Coast	72–80	Senegal

Day 5

Central African Republic	85–80	Egypt
Senegal	67–65	Algeria

== Knockout stage ==
Semi-finals
December 26, 1987
Angola	77
Egypt	83
December 26, 1987
Central African Rep.	74
Mali	73

Final
December 27, 1987
Egypt	87
Central African Rep.	94
Third place
December 27, 1987
Angola	73
Mali	71

== Classification stage ==
Tunisia	78–76	Senegal
Ivory Coast	89–77	Nigeria

== Final standings ==
Qualified for the 1988 Summer Olympics

Rank	Team	Record
Gold medal	Central Africa	6–0
Silver medal	Egypt	4–2
Bronze medal	Angola	4–1
4	Mali	1–4
5	Tunisia	2–2
6	Senegal	2–3
7	Ivory Coast	2–3
8	Nigeria	1–3
9	Algeria	0–4

C.A.R. roster
François Naouéyama, Jean-Pierre Kotta, Guy Mbongo, Eugene Pehoua-Pelema, Richard Bella, Aubin Goporo, Anicet Lavodrama, Christian Gombé, Fred Goporo, Bruno Kongawoin, Kader Fall, Oumarou Sanda

== Awards ==
1987 FIBA Africa Championship

Central African Republic
Second title

Most Valuable Player
(Central African Republic) Frédéric Goporo
