= Khaled Matrud =

Libyan basketball player (born 1989)

Libya national basketball team

Personal information
- Born: 9 November 1989; Benghazi

Khaled Saad Ahmed Matrud (born 9 November 1989 in Benghazi) is a Libyan basketball player. He was part of the Libya national basketball team at the FIBA Africa Championship 2009, where he played for two minutes in one game and did not score.
