= Custódio Muchate =

Mozambican basketball player

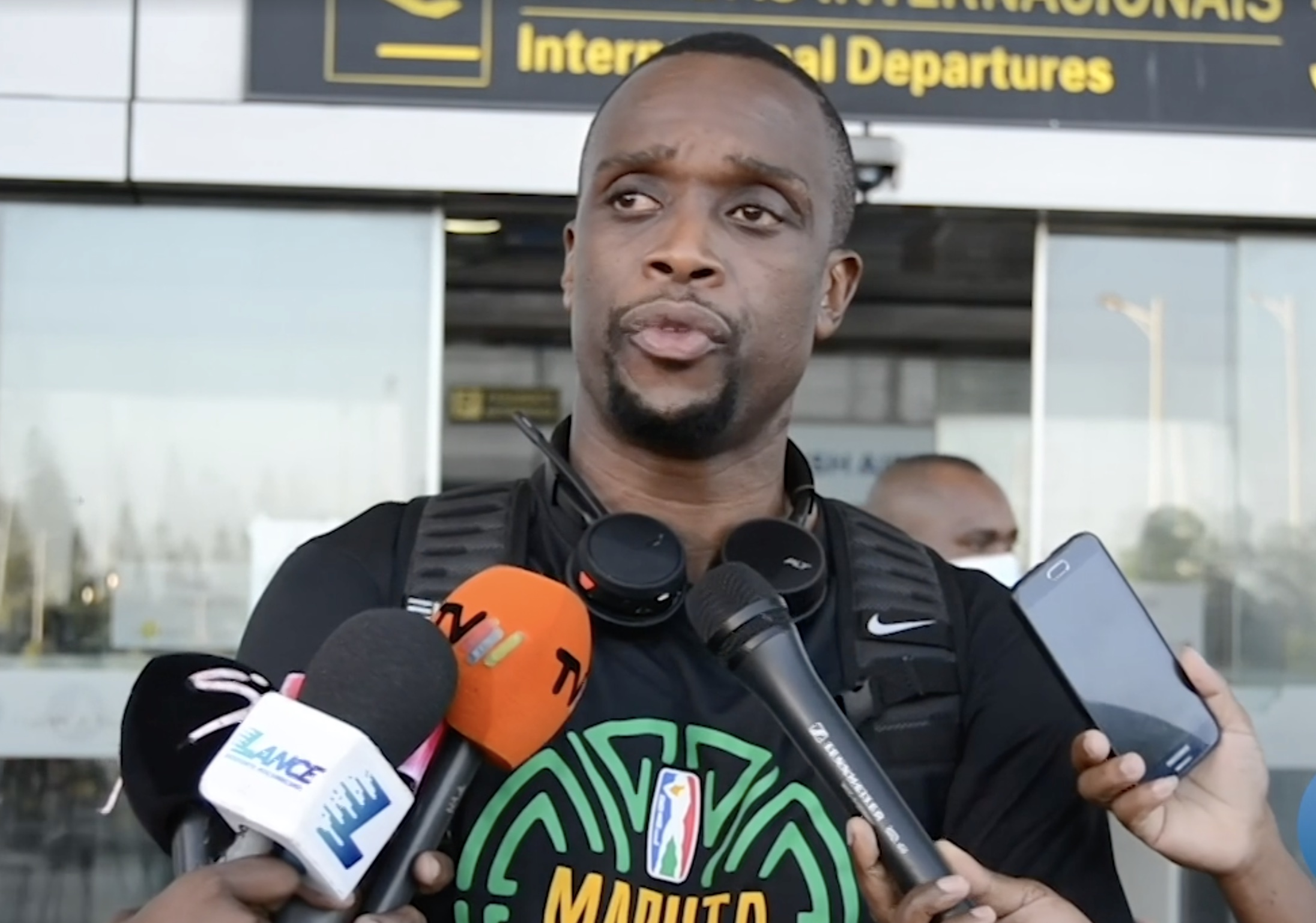
- Muchate being interviewed after the 2021 BAL season

No. 24 – Ferroviário de Maputo
- Position: Center
- League: Basketball Africa League; Mozambican Basketball League

Personal information
- Born: 6 May 1982 (age 44) Maputo, Mozambique
- Listed height: 1.99 m (6 ft 6 in)

Career history
- 2013–present: Ferroviário de Maputo

Career highlights
- 4× Mozambican League champion (2016–2019)

Custódio Anão Muchate (born 6 May 1982) is a Mozambique basketball player for Ferroviário de Maputo of the Mozambican Basketball League. He was a member of the Mozambican national basketball team for 19 years.

== Professional career ==
Since 2013, Muchate plays with Ferroviário de Maputo in the Mozambican Basketball League and FIBA organised tournaments.

Muchate was on the Ferroviário roster for the 2021 BAL season, the inaugural season of the Basketball Africa League, where his team was eliminated in the quarter-finals.

== National team career ==
Muchate was a member of the Mozambique national basketball team after making his debut at age 19, in 2001. He appeared with his country at the 2005, 2007, 2009, 2013 and 2015 AfroBasket championships. In 2020, he retired from the national team after 19 years.

== BAL career statistics ==
Legend
GP	Games played	GS	Games started	MPG	Minutes per game
FG%	Field goal percentage	3P%	3-point field goal percentage	FT%	Free throw percentage
RPG	Rebounds per game	APG	Assists per game	SPG	Steals per game
BPG	Blocks per game	PPG	Points per game	**Bold**	Career high

Year	Team	GP	GS	MPG	FG%	3P%	FT%	RPG	APG	SPG	BPG	PPG
2021	Ferroviário de Maputo	4	4	29.8	.364	.333	.875	7.5	2.3	.0	.0	6.5
Career		4	4	29.8	.364	.333	.875	7.5	2.3	.0	.0	6.5

== Personal ==
Besides playing basketball, Muchate works as a manager at a beer brewing company.
