= Sete Muianga =

Mozambican basketball player

Seté Elias Muianga (born 16 July 1979) is a Mozambique basketball player currently with Maxaquene Maputo of the Mozambique Professional Basketball League. He is also a member of the Mozambique national basketball team and appeared with the club at the 2005 and 2009 African Championships as well as qualifying for the 2007 Championships .
