= Yahia Shakmak =

Libyan basketball player (born 1985)

Yahia M. Shakmak (born 9 January 1985 in Benghazi) is a Libyan basketball player. He competed with the Libya national basketball team at AfroBasket 2009, where he averaged 1.5 points per game over 6 games.
