= Lamine Diawara =

Malian basketball player (born 1971)

Personal information
- Born: 1971 (age 54–55) Bamako, Mali
- Listed height: 6 ft 10 in (2.08 m)

Career highlights
- FIBA AfroBasket Most Valuable Player (1999)

Lamine Diawara (born 1971 in Bamako) is a retired Malian basketball player. Diawara was a member of the Mali national basketball team, and earned the FIBA AfroBasket Most Valuable Player while playing with Team Mali at the FIBA Africa Championship 1999.

Diawara played his club ball with Al Ittihad Aleppo in Syria, where he was both the import player of the year and player of the year in 2005–06 in Syria's top league. Prior to playing in Syria, Diawara played with Anibal Zahle in the Lebanese Basketball League.

The 6-foot-10-inch (208 cm) Diawara is the brother of former WNBA player Nare Diawara and current (2019–20) Ligue Féminine de Basketball player Diéné Diawara.
