= Malick Badiane =

Senegalese basketball player (born 1984)

Personal information
- Born: January 1, 1984 (age 42) Dakar, Senegal
- Listed height: 6 ft 11 in (2.11 m)
- Listed weight: 240 lb (109 kg)

Career information
- NBA draft: 2003: 2nd round, 44th overall pick
- Drafted by: Houston Rockets
- Playing career: 2000–2018
- Position: Forward / center

Career history
- 2000–2002: US Rail
- 2002–2003: TV Langen
- 2003–2006: Skyliners Frankfurt
- 2006–2007: Artland Dragons
- 2007: JDA Dijon
- 2007–2008: SVBD
- 2008: Dongguan Leopards
- 2009: Anaheim Arsenal
- 2009–2010: JSF Nanterre
- 2010–2011: Boulazac Dordogne
- 2011: Olympique Antibes
- 2011–2012: Hermine de Nantes Atlantique
- 2012: Saint-Quentin
- 2013–2014: UB Chartres Métropole
- 2015–2020: Fougeres
- Stats at Basketball Reference

Malick Badiane (born January 1, 1984) is a Senegalese former professional basketball player. He played mainly as a center, but could also play at the power forward position. He is 6 ft 11 in (2.11 m) in height.

== Club career ==
=== Early years ===
Badiane started his career playing for the US Rail Thies team in the Senegalese League in the 2000–01 season. He emerged on the American basketball scene after an impressive showing at the ABCD Camp in Teaneck, New Jersey, United States. There, he shined despite getting limited touches, emerging as one of the camp's top 30 players.

=== Europe ===
Badiane, then eighteen years old, signed with TV Langen in the German second division (acting as a farm team for the Opel Skyliners, in the German top level), and averaged 11.7 points and 8.9 rebounds per game during the 2002–03 season, making an immediate impact. He turned in a pair of 27-point performances and observers of the league believed that he blocked an average of two shots per game (blocks were not kept as an official statistic in the league).

Badiane then spent the next three years with the Skyliners, moving to another side in the league, the Artland Dragons, for the 2006–07 season. He would spend the 2007–08 season with JDA Dijon in the French Pro A league.

=== NBA draft rights ===
Although projected as a mid-to-late first-round pick in the 2003 NBA draft and the next big center from Senegal, Badiane was not taken until late in the second round with the 44th pick by the Houston Rockets. He would only appear (twice) in Summer League play for the Rockets.

Then general manager of the Rockets Carroll Dawson said in 2007 that Badiane was an intriguing prospect and that the Rockets still did intend to bring him to the NBA at some future point, after he had continued to develop his game and skills in Europe. Dawson claimed that Badiane still had value to the Rockets because at 6'11" and 240 pounds, he had a 7'4" wingspan, a 32" vertical leap, and was seen as a solid defensive and rebounding talent, playing both interior positions. Dawson also stated that Badiane "...is still very raw and still needs several years of skill development."

On February 21, 2008, Badiane's draft rights were traded to the Memphis Grizzlies in exchange for the draft rights to Sergei Lishchuk. He played in the Las Vegas Summer League with the Grizzlies' summer squad, and his play there earned him a spot on the team's training camp roster. However, after appearing in only one preseason match, he was waived. He then signed with the Anaheim Arsenal of the NBA D-League.

He then continued his career in France. In June 2020, Badiane announced his retirement.

== National team career ==
Also a member of Senegal's junior national sides, Badiane is an established member of the Senegal national senior team, and has competed in the FIBA AfroBasket in 2003, 2005, 2007, 2009, and 2011. In the 2005 tournament he helped lead the nation to the silver medal.

Badiane also appeared at the 2006 FIBA World Championship, which was held in Saitama, Saitama, Japan.

== Player profile ==
Badiane has a lean body and is considered one of Africa's most athletic players. As an athlete, Badiane has better mobility than most of his counterparts. Although considered very raw, he is aggressive going after rebounds, blocking shots and running the floor.

== Personal ==
- Badiane has 18 brothers and sisters.
- He considers Kevin Garnett his favorite player and the Dallas Mavericks his favorite team NBA team.
