= Sambou Traoré =

Malian-French basketball player

Sambou Traoré (born November 25, 1979, in Paris) is a Malian-French basketball player currently playing for Boulazac Basket Dordogne in the Ligue Nationale de Basketball. He is a member of the Mali national basketball team.

In the professional season, 2008–09, Traore averaged 11.2 points and 4.8 rebounds per game for Boulazac in the French Pro B league.

Traoré has played for the Mali national basketball team in the FIBA Africa Championship in 2005 and 2009. The team reached the quarterfinals in each of these appearances.
