= Kingsley Ogwudire =

Nigerian basketball player

Kingsley Ogwudire (born January 20, 1972) is a Nigerian professional basketball player, formerly with the Harlem Globetrotters, Antranik SC of Beirut, Lebanon, and Al-Ittihad of Syria. He played college basketball at Montana State University-Northern in 1996-97. He is also a longtime member of the Nigeria national basketball team, including appearances at the 1998 FIBA World Championship and FIBA Africa Championship 2005.
