= Cedrick Kalombo Lukanda =

South African basketball player

Cedrick Lukanda Kalombo (born 2 June 1983) is a South African basketball player at Clayton State University in the United States and the South Africa national basketball team. He competed with South Africa at the 2009 FIBA Africa Championship.
