= Maurice Beyina =

French basketball player (born 1971)

Personal information
- Born: August 8, 1971 (age 55) Saint-Denis, France
- Listed height: 198 cm (6 ft 6 in)

Career information
- College: Dayton (1993–1997)
- Playing career: 1991–2004
- Position: Forward
- Number: 6

Career history
- 1991–1993: EB Pau-Orthez
- 1997–1998: Poissy-Chatou
- 1998–2000: Elan Chalon
- 2000–2001: Strasbourg IG
- 2001–2003: JL Bourg-en-Bresse
- 2003–2004: SLUC Nancy

Career highlights
- French league champion (1992); Leaders Cup champion (1992)

Maurice Beyina (born August 8, 1971, in Saint-Denis, France) is a French former basketball player who played seven seasons in the LNB Pro A. He won the French championship in 1992 as a member of EB Pau-Orthez. He played for the Central African Republic national basketball team from 1997 to 2005.

== College ==
Beyina played for the University of Dayton from 1993 to 1997.
