= Ali Bouziane =

Algerian basketball player

Personal information
- Born: March 25, 1977 (age 49) Boufarik, Blida Province, Algeria
- Listed height: 6 ft 4 in (1.93 m)
- Listed weight: 176 lb (80 kg)

Career information
- Playing career: 1995–2009
- Position: Point guard

Career history
- 1995–1999: Toulouse Spacers
- 1999–2004: Gravelines
- 2004–2005: Racing Paris
- 2005–2006: Asseco Prokom Gdynia
- 2006–2009: JDA Dijon
- 2009: AEL Limassol

Ali Bouziane (born 25 March 1977 in Boufarik, Blida Province) is a former Algerian professional basketball player. He also played for the Algeria national basketball team.

== Professional basketball player ==
=== Paris Basket Racing ===
August 2005 – February 2006 7 months

Ali Bouziane was recruited by Polish Euroleague team Sopot Trefl for the 2005/2006 season from Paris Basket Racing, his first experience abroad.

=== Levallois Metropolitans ===
August 2004 – June 2005 11 months

Paris Area, France

After 5 years and a lot of emotions in the north of France, he signed with Paris Basket Racing.

Performance and titles:

Best defence of the league

==== BCM Gravelines Dunkerque ====
August 1999 – June 2004 4 years, 11 months

Gravelines

After "Toulouse Spacer's" Bank out in 1999, Bouziane signed for BCM Gravelines Dunkerque in proA (1st division).

Performance and titles:

Best Africa starting five (guard)

French National team A'

==== Toulouse spacer's ====
August 1995 – June 1999 3 years, 11 months

Toulouse Area, France

After 2 seasons at "pôle France Yvan Mainini" in Paris from 16 to 18 years old, he started his professional career at 18 years old in ProB (2nd French division) in Toulouse.

Performance and titles:

1995 selected for the U21 French All star game (Dijon)

== Coach ==
- Elan Chalon

June 2019 – present

- AS Monaco Basket-Ball S.A. (ROCA TEAM)

August 2014 – October 2018 4 years, 3 months

Monaco area

After a 5-year break from basketball, Monaco was his first experience as a coach. He started from the bottom. He coached the U15 in Menton Basket Club and the U17 in A.S. Monaco Basketball the 1st season.

- 2017/2018 A.S Monaco
- 2016/2017 A.S MONACO
- 2015/2016 A.S. Monaco
- 2014/2015 A.S Monaco
