= Modibo Niakaté =

French-Malian basketball player

Personal information
- Born: 21 March 1981 (age 45) Créteil, France
- Listed height: 1.88 m (6 ft 2 in)
- Listed weight: 85 kg (187 lb)

Career information
- College: Cleveland State (2002–2005)
- NBA draft: 2005: undrafted
- Playing career: 2005–2020
- Position: Point guard

Career history
- 2005: BS Energy Braunschweig
- 2005: Chorale Roanne
- 2005: Élan Chalon
- 2005–2007: Chorale Roanne
- 2007–2008: Limoges CSP
- 2008–2009: Prostějov
- 2009–2010: Stade Clermontois BA
- 2010–2011: Orchies
- 2011–2012: Rueil Athletic Club
- 2013–2016: Puy-en-Velay
- 2016–2020: Cergy Pontoise

Career highlights
- AfroBasket top scorer (2007)

Modibo Niakaté is a Malian basketball player. He played for the Mali national basketball team. Niakaté played college basketball for Cleveland State, before playing professionally in France, Czech Republic and Germany.

Niakaté was the top scorer of AfroBasket 2007, where he averaged 21.8 points per game.
