= Nouha Diakité =

French–Malian basketball player

Personal information
- Born: 20 December 1980 (age 45) Athis-Mons, Essonne, France
- Listed height: 6 ft 10 in (2.08 m)
- Listed weight: 239.8 lb (109 kg)

Career information
- College: Barton County CC (2001–2003); Louisville (2003–2004)
- Playing career: 2004–2017
- Position: Center

Career history
- 2004–2005: JA Vichy
- 2005–2006: ESPE Basket Châlons-en-Champagne
- 2006: Aix Maurienne Savoie Basket
- 2006–2008: ASVEL Villeurbanne
- 2008: BK Prostějov
- 2008–2009: Hyères-Toulon
- 2009: Illescas
- 2009–2010: Pau-Orthez
- 2010–2011: Champagne Châlons Reims
- 2011–2012: JA Vichy
- 2012–2013: Mouloudia Oujda
- 2013: Lille
- 2014: Saint-Quentin
- 2016–2017: Alerte de Juvisy

Nouha Diakité (born 20 December 1980) is a French and Malian former basketball player. He was a member of the Mali national basketball team.

In his most recent professional season, 2008–09, Diakate bounced from BK Prostejov of the Czech League to Hyeres-Toulon Var Basket of the French League before landing with CB Illescas Urban CLM in Spain for the last 14 games of the season. On 31 August 2009, he signed with Pau-Orthez of the Ligue Nationale de Basketball.

Nouha Diakité has played for the Mali national basketball team in the FIBA Africa Championship in 2005, 2007, and 2009. The team reached the quarterfinals in each of these appearances.
