= El Kabir Pene =

Senegalese basketball player

El Kabir Pene, born 18 December 1984 in Thiès, Senegal, is a Senegalese basketball player.

== Statistics ==
- Height : 1m90
- Position : guard
- Regular number:

== Biography ==
He plays as a guard for the Senegal national basketball team. El Kabir Pene participated in the 2006 World Championships in Japan.

== Clubs ==
- 2003 - 2005 : US Gorée (1st division)
- December 2005 - May 2006 : Stade Clermontois (Pro A)
- May 2006 - June 2006 : Vichy (Pro B)
- 2006 - 2007 : Stade Clermontois (Pro A)
- 2008 - 2009 : ASM Basket Le Puy-en-Velay (France)

== Career with the Senegal national team ==
Senegalese international, El Kabir Pene participated in the African Championships in 2005 and the 2006 World Championships in Japan.

== Titles ==
- Silver medal at the 2005 African Championships, (Alger, Algeria)
