= Abdourahmane N'Diaye (basketball) =

Senegalese basketball player

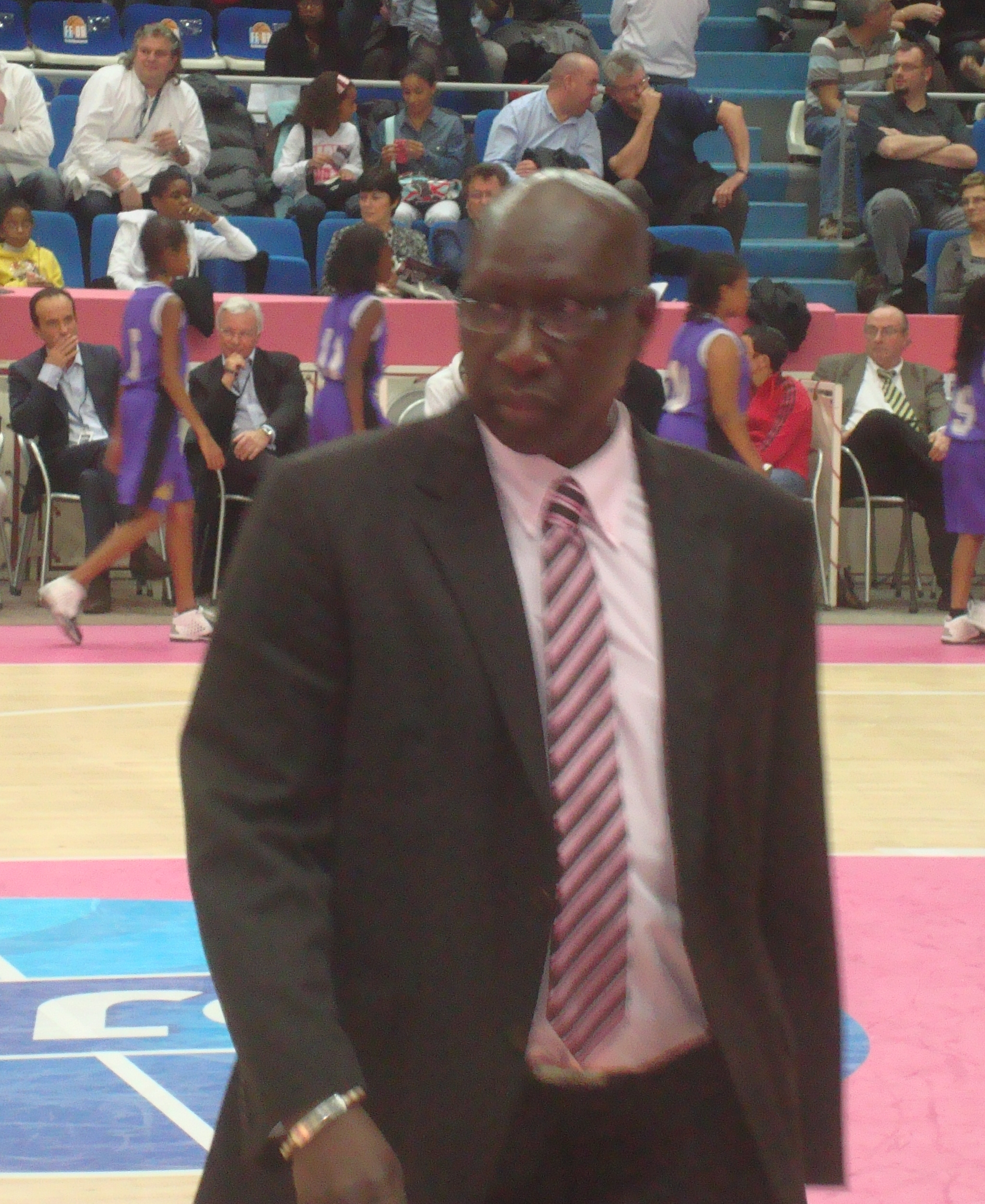
- Abdourahmane N'Diaye in 2010

Personal information
- Nationality: Senegalese
- Born: 24 June 1953 (age 71)

Sport
- Sport: Basketball

Abdourahmane N'Diaye (born 24 June 1953) is a Senegalese basketball player who competed in the men's tournament at the 1972 Summer Olympics.
