= Olumide Oyedeji =

Nigerian basketball player

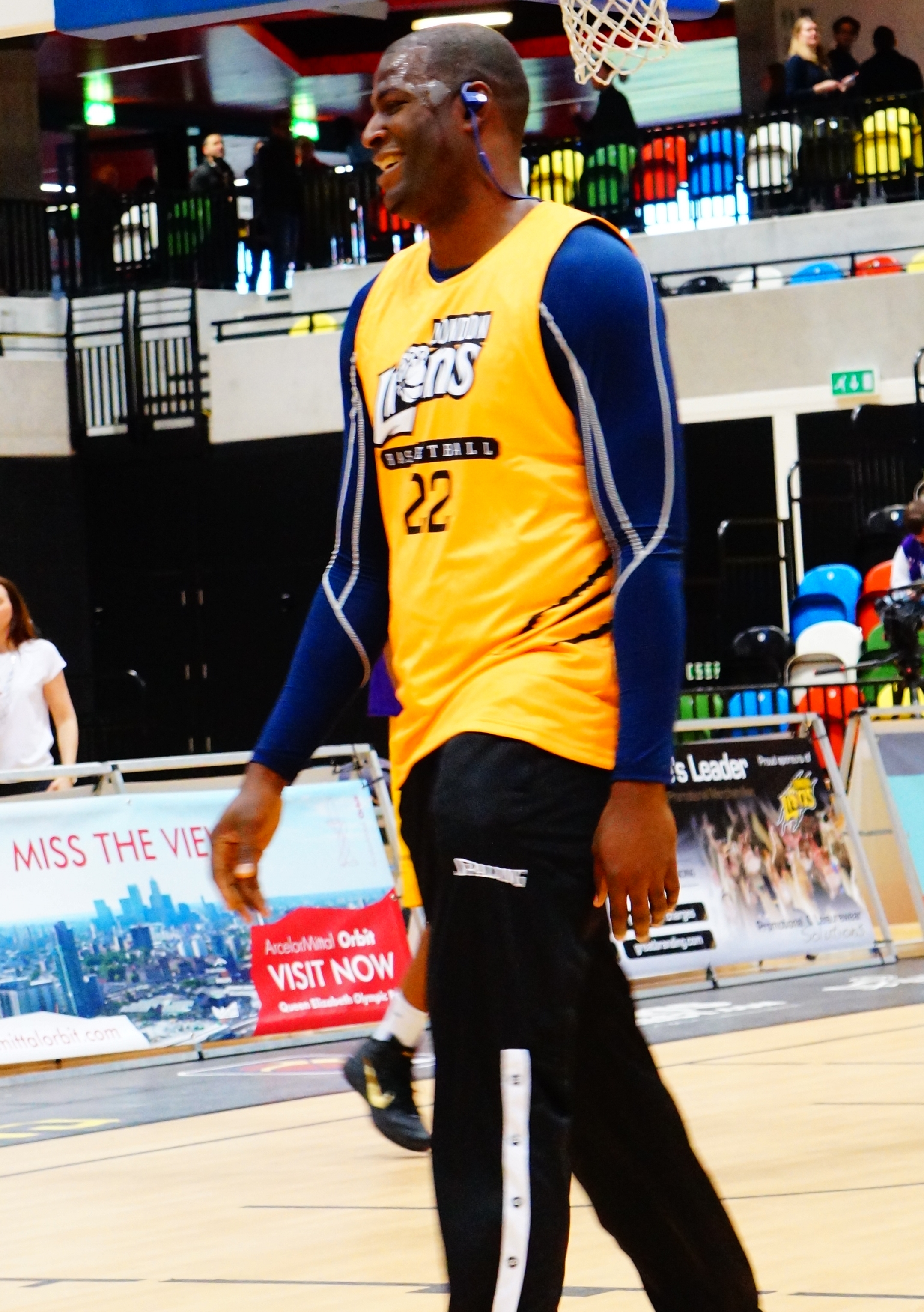
- Olumide Oyedeji warming up for the London Lions

Personal information
- Born: 11 May 1981 (age 45) Ibadan, Oyo State, Nigeria
- Listed height: 6 ft 10 in (2.08 m)
- Listed weight: 255 lb (116 kg)

Career information
- NBA draft: 2000: 2nd round, 42nd overall pick
- Drafted by: Seattle SuperSonics
- Playing career: 1996–2016
- Position: Center
- Number: 00

Career history
- 1996–1997: Ebun Comets
- 1997–1998: Dynamo Moscow
- 1998–2000: DJK Würzburg
- 2000–2002: Seattle SuperSonics
- 2002–2003: Orlando Magic
- 2003: Ilysiakos
- 2003–2004: Union Olimpija
- 2004: Beijing Ducks
- 2004: Al-Kuwait SC
- 2004–2005: Beijing Ducks
- 2005: Cangrejeros
- 2005–2006: Seoul Thunders
- 2006: Cangrejeros
- 2006–2007: Seoul Thunders
- 2007: Al-Kuwait SC
- 2007–2008: Beijing Ducks
- 2008: Liaoning Hunters
- 2008: Granada
- 2008–2009: Shanxi Zhongyu
- 2009: Vaqueros de Bayamón
- 2009–2010: Liaoning Hunters
- 2010: ASU Sports Club
- 2010: Juvecaserta Basket
- 2011: Changwon LG Sakers
- 2011–2012: Qingdao
- 2013–2013: Link Tochigi Brex
- 2015–2016: London Lions

Career highlights
- BSN Champion (2009); 2× BSN All-Star (2008, 2006); CBA All-Star (2010); 3× CBA rebounding leader (2004, 2008, 2009); Korean League All-Star Game MVP (2007); BBL All-Star Game MVP (2000); 2× BBL Slam Dunk Contest champion (1998, 1999); Nigerian League MVP (1997)
- Stats at NBA.com
- Stats at Basketball Reference
Medals
Men's basketball
Representing Nigeria
FIBA Africa Championship
Gold medal – first place	2015 Tunisia	National Team
Bronze medal – third place	2005 Algeria	National Team
Bronze medal – third place	2011 Madagascar	National Team

Olumide Oyedeji OLY (born 11 May 1981) is a Nigerian former professional basketball center. He is now President of Hoops N' Read basketball club, Gidi Giants Basketball Club and Dolphins Basketball Club.

He played in the National Basketball Association (NBA) for three seasons.

He is the President of Nigeria Olympian Association (NOA), and the Vice President of Nigeria Olympic Committee (NOC), Chairman Nigeria Athletes Commission.

== Professional career ==
Oyedeji played at the 1999 and 2000 Nike Hoop Summits. He was selected by the Seattle SuperSonics, in the 2nd round (42nd overall) of the 2000 NBA draft. He played a total of 93 games during 3 seasons in the NBA, and had career averages of 1.4 points per game, 2.1 rebounds per game, 0.1 assists per game, and 0.2 steals per game. His final NBA game was played on 1 April 2003, in a 105–118 loss to the San Antonio Spurs where he recorded no stats. He also played in the Spanish League with Granada.

Oyedeji played with Shanxi Zhongyu in the Chinese Basketball Association. He played with Changwon LG Sakers of the Korean Basketball League in 2011. However, he was released from the team, despite averaging 10.8 points, 15.0 rebounds, and 1.7 blocks per game. Oyedeji then signed on with the London Lions, who compete in the British Basketball League, in 2015.

== National team ==
Oyedeji has been a member of the senior men's Nigerian national basketball team since 1997. He contributed immensely to his national team's participation at the FIBA Africa Nations Cup in 1997, 1999, 2001, 2003, 2005, 2007, 2011, 2013 and 2015. He led Nigeria to its first ever AfroBasket trophy in Tunisia in 2015. Oyedeji won silver medals in 1997, 1999 and 2003 respectively during the FIBA Africa Nations Cup. He won the bronze medal at the 2005 FIBA Africa Championship and 2011 FIBA Africa Championship. Oyedeji has represented his home country in the All Africa Games winning bronze in 1999, 2007 and 2015, silver in 2003 and gold in 2011. He also played at the FIBA World Cup in 1999 and at the 2012 Summer Olympics. Oyedeji is the inaugural African player to ever feature in all major basketball tournaments on the global stage, including Olympic Games, World Cup, Commonwealth Games, All Africa Games, NBA, Euro-League, and Asia Championships.

Oyedeji featured in the invitational tournament in South Africa where he captained the team and led them to victory in the finals. Nigeria's basketball team, D'Tigers, emerged overall winners of the 2015 Four Nations' invitational basketball tournament hosted by South Africa on Sunday 22 March 2015. Oyedeji, the long serving captain of the Nigerian Men's national team, emerged the MVP of the tournament. D'Tigers beat Mozambique 72–59 in their final game to win the inaugural tournament held at the Wembley Indoor Arena in Johannesburg. He retired from the Nigerian national basketball team several weeks before the 2016 Summer Olympics in Rio de Janeiro.

== FIBA ==
The International Basketball Federation, FIBA, Central Board appointed Oyedeji, to the FIBA Players commission for the 2014–2019 term. Oyedeji's appointment resulted from his nomination by the Nigerian Basketball Federation in line with the criteria provided by the world governing body of basketball. He is expected to serve in the newly inaugurated FIBA Players commission under the chairmanship of former Serbian International and NBA great, Vlade Divac. Oyedeji is also a member of the board of the Nigeria Basketball Federation.

== Personal life ==
Oyedeji had his secondary education at Loyola College, Ibadan where he started playing as a member of the school's senior basketball team.

Oyedeji is married to Adejoke Fajemisin. They have five children together.

== Career statistics ==
Legend
GP	Games played	GS	Games started	MPG	Minutes per game
FG%	Field goal percentage	3P%	3-point field goal percentage	FT%	Free throw percentage
RPG	Rebounds per game	APG	Assists per game	SPG	Steals per game
BPG	Blocks per game	PPG	Points per game	**Bold**	Career high

=== NBA ===
==== Regular season ====
Year	Team	GP	GS	MPG	FG%	3P%	FT%	RPG	APG	SPG	BPG	PPG
2000–01	Seattle	30	1	**7.4**	.486	–	**.750**	**2.2**	.1	**.2**	**.3**	**1.5**
2001–02	Seattle	**36**	1	6.1	**.537**	–	.611	**2.2**	.1	.1	.1	**1.5**
2002–03	Orlando	27	**3**	5.4	.435	–	.636	1.9	**.2**	**.2**	.1	1.0
Career		93	5	6.3	.495	–	.659	2.1	.1	.2	.2	1.4

==== Playoffs ====
Year	Team	GP	GS	MPG	FG%	3P%	FT%	RPG	APG	SPG	BPG	PPG
2002	Seattle	3	0	5.7	.800	–	.200	2.0	.3	.0	.0	3.0
