= Max Mombollet =

Central African basketball player

Maixant Magloire Mombollet (born 17 January 1981 in Bangui, Central African Republic) is a former college basketball player with The Citadel from 2000-2004. He has played with the Central African Republic national basketball team in 2001, 2003, 2005, 2007 and 2009 FIBA Africa Championships, helping the team to quarterfinal appearances in 2005, 2007, and 2009. At his top level he plays as power forward for Orcines in the French Professional Basketball League but also in some other Professional Club in north of France.

In 2018, he retired from basketball to start to his new career of Project Manager at Neoledge.
