= Régis Koundjia =

Central African basketball player

Personal information
- Born: 8 November 1983 (age 43) Bangui, Central African Republic
- Listed height: 6 ft 8 in (2.03 m)
- Listed weight: 210 lb (95 kg)

Career information
- High school: Laurinburg Institute (Laurinburg, North Carolina)
- College: LSU (2003–2005); George Washington (2005–2007)
- NBA draft: 2007: undrafted
- Position: Forward

Career history
- 2008–2009: Vermont Frost Heaves
- 2009–2010: JA Vichy
- 2010–2011: Trappes
- 2011–2012: Le Puy

Career highlights
- Third-team Parade All-American (2003)

Régis Junior Koundjia-Sindo (born 8 November 1983) is a Central African former professional basketball player. He played college basketball for the LSU Tigers and George Washington Colonials from 2003 to 2007. Koundjia played with the Central African Republic national basketball team in the FIBA Africa Championship games in 2005, 2007 and 2009.

He signed with the Vermont Frost Heaves of the Premier Basketball League (PBL) for the 2008–09 season after he played in the NBA Summer League for the San Antonio Spurs.

== Personal life ==
Koundjia was born in Bangui, Central African Republic. His father, a Central African Republic diplomat, was killed by poisoning in 1991. Koundjia majored in sociology at George Washington University.
