= Fusi Mazibuko =

South African basketball player

Fusi Joseph Mazibuko (born 3 February 1980) is a South African basketball player with the Egoli Magic of South Africa's Premier Basketball League. He is also a member of the South Africa national basketball team and appeared with the club at the 2005, 2007 and 2009 African Championships.
