= Quintin Denyssen =

South African basketball player

Quintin Cedrick Denyssen (born 27 August 1980) is a South African basketball player with the Egoli Magic of South Africa's Premier Basketball League. He is also a member of the South Africa national basketball team and appeared with the club at the 2007 and 2009 African Championships as well as the 2006 Commonwealth Games.
