= Babacar Cissé =

Senegalese basketball player

Personal information
- Born: December 2, 1975 (age 50) Ndoulo, Senegal
- Listed height: 1.88 m (6 ft 2 in)
- Listed weight: 81 kg (179 lb)

Career information
- Playing career: 1990–2011
- Position: Guard

Career history
- 1990–1993: BOPP
- 1995–2000: Cabourg
- 2000–2001: Golfe Juan
- 2001–2005: JA Vichy
- 2005–2007: STB Le Havre
- 2007–2011: Fos Ouest Provence Basket

Career highlights
- LNB Pro B champion (2002)

Babacar Cissé (born 2 December 1975) is a retired Senegalese professional basketball player. He spent the biggest part of his career playing in France. He was also a member of the Senegal national basketball team.
