= Mali men's national basketball team =

Mali
- FIBA ranking: 61 ▲2 (1 September 2026)
- Joined FIBA: 1961
- FIBA zone: FIBA Africa
- National federation: Fédération Malienne de Basketball
- Coach: Alhadji Dicko

AfroBasket
- Appearances: 21
- Medals: Silver: (2025); Bronze: (1972)
Home	Away

Mali national basketball team (French: équipe du Mali de basket-ball) represents Mali in men's international basketball competitions has yet to appear in the FIBA World Championship. Their best performance was during FIBA AfroBasket 2025, where they won a silver medal, only losing to hosts Angola in the final. In 1972, Mali finished with a bronze medal. Mali has yet to qualify for the FIBA Basketball World Cup.

== Tournament record ==
=== World Cup ===
- Yet to qualify

=== Afrobasket ===
- 1964 – 6th
- 1968 – 4th
- 1972 – 3rd
- 1974 – 7th
- 1987 – 4th
- 1989 – 4th
- 1992 – 4th
- 1993 – 7th
- 1995 – 5th
- 1997 – 6th
- 1999 – 4th
- 2001 – 11th
- 2005 – 8th
- 2007 – 11th
- 2009 – 8th
- 2011 – 9th
- 2013 – 15th
- 2015 – 7th
- 2017 – 9th
- 2021 – 15th
- 2025 – 2nd

=== AfroCan ===
- 2019 – 5th
- 2023 – 12th

== Team ==
=== Current roster ===
Roster for the AfroBasket 2025.

Mali men's national basketball team roster
Players
Coaches

Pos.	No.	Name	Age – Date of birth	Height	Club	Ctr.
PG	4	Siriman Kanoute	23 – 25 September 2001	1.76 m (5 ft 9 in)	SLUC Nancy Basket	(France)
F	5	Mohamed Wague	25 – 17 December 1999	2.08 m (6 ft 10 in)	Oklahoma Sooners	(United States)
PG	8	Allaye Togo	22 – 7 August 2003	1.83 m (6 ft 0 in)	Stade Malien	(Mali)
SF	9	Ibrahima Haidara (C)	32 – 9 October 1992	2.05 m (6 ft 9 in)	Nantes	(France)
SF	10	Fousseyni Drame	24 – 18 August 2000	2.00 m (6 ft 7 in)	Free agent
C	11	Oumar Ballo	23 – 13 July 2002	2.08 m (6 ft 10 in)	Free agent
PF	12	Mahamane Coulibaly	24 – 28 January 2001	2.06 m (6 ft 9 in)	Stade Malien	(Mali)
SG	14	Hassan Drame	24 – 18 August 2000	2.00 m (6 ft 7 in)	AS Police	(Senegal)
F	20	Tamandjan Konate	22 – 2 November 2002	1.99 m (6 ft 6 in)	Free agent
C	24	Moulaye Sissoko	25 – 17 November 1999	1.85 m (6 ft 1 in)	Free agent
C	31	Aliou Diarra	23 – 31 December 2001	2.08 m (6 ft 10 in)	APR BBC	(Rwanda)
PF	35	Mamoudou Diarra	27 – 4 October 1997	1.95 m (6 ft 5 in)	Free agent

Head coach

- (Mali) Alhadji Dicko

Assistant coach(es)

- (Mali) Abdoulaye Coulibaly
- (Mali) Boubacar Kanouté

Legend

- (C) Team captain
- Club – describes last
  club before the tournament
- Age – describes age
  on 12 August 2025

=== Past rosters ===
Team for the 2013 FIBA Africa Championship.

Mali men's national basketball team roster
Players
Coaches

Pos.	No.	Name	Age – Date of birth	Height	Club
G	4	Modibo Niakate	32 – 26 March 1981	1.85 m (6 ft 1 in)
	5	Mahamadou Kante	21 – 2 March 1992
	6	Abdrahamane Maïga	23 – 11 January 1990
G	7	Ibrahim Saounera	26 – 3 April 1987	1.78 m (5 ft 10 in)
	9	Ibrahima Cherif Haidara	20 – 9 October 1992
	11	Namory Boundy	23 – 26 October 1989		Chorale Roanne Basket
	12	Boubacar Fadiala Sidibe	18 – 8 September 1994
C	13	Hassana Touré	33 – 30 July 1980	2.05 m (6 ft 9 in)	ASVEL Basket
C	14	Mohamed Tangara	29 – 11 August 1984	2.09 m (6 ft 10 in)	C.R.D. Libolo
C	15	Nouha Diakité	32 – 20 December 1980	2.08 m (6 ft 10 in)	BK Prostějov

Head coach

- José Ruiz

Legend

- Club – describes last
  club before the tournament
- Age – describes age
  on 20 August 2013

=== Head coach position ===
- José Ruiz – 2011–2013

== See also ==
- Mali national under-19 basketball team
