= List of indoor arenas in Africa =

This is a list of indoor arenas in Africa with seating capacities of at least of 2,000.

== Current arenas ==
Country	Location	Arena	Date built	Capacity	Image	Ref.
Algeria (List)	Algiers	Hacène Harcha Arena	1975	8,000		
Algeria (List)	Oran	Hamou Boutlélis Sports Palace	1960	5,000		
Algeria (List)	Bir El Djir	Miloud Hadefi Omnisport Arena	2022	7,000		
Algeria (List)	Chéraga	La Coupole d’Alger Arena	1975	5,500		
Algeria (List)	Arzew	24 February Indoor Hall	2007	3,000		
Angola	Luanda	Pavilhão da Cidadela		6,873		
Angola	Luanda	Pavilhão Multiusos de Luanda	2013	12,750		
Angola	Luanda	Pavilhão Dream Space	2010	2,500		
Angola	Benguela	Pavilhão Acácias Rubras	2007	2,100		
Angola	Cabinda	Pavilhão do Tafe	2007	2,100		
Angola	Huambo	Pavilhão Serra Van-Dúnem	2007	2,100		
Angola	Lubango	Pavilhão Nossa Senhora do Monte	2007	2,000		
Angola	Malanje	Pavilhão Palanca Negra Gigante	2013	3,000		
Angola	Moçâmedes	Pavilhão Welwitschia Mirabilis	2013	3,000		
Cameroon	Yaoundé	Yaoundé Multipurpose Sports Complex	2008	5,263		
Cameroon	Douala	Japoma Arena	2022	2,000		
Central African Republic	Bangui	Martin Ngoko National Basketball Center		5,000		
Congo	Brazzaville	Palais des Sports Kintélé	2015	10,134		
DR Congo	Kinshasa	Stade des Martyrs Gymnasium 1	2023	3,000		
DR Congo	Kinshasa	Stade des Martyrs Gymnasium 2	2023	2,000		
Egypt (List)	Cairo	Cairo Stadium Indoor Halls Complex	1991	20,000		
Egypt (List)	Cairo	Abdulrahman Fawzi Hall	1986	4,000		
Egypt (List)	Cairo	Al Ahly Sports Hall	1991	2,500		
Egypt (List)	New Administrative Capital	Olympic City Hall 1	2023	15,000		
Egypt (List)	New Administrative Capital	Olympic City Hall 2	2023	8,000		
Egypt (List)	New Administrative Capital	Sports City indoor Hall	2021	7,000		
Egypt (List)	Alexandria	Borg El Arab Sports Hall	2021	5,000		
Egypt (List)	Port Said	Port Said Hall	1999	5,000		
Gabon	Libreville	Le Palais des Sports de Libreville	2018	6,000		
Ghana	Accra	Borteyman Sports Complex	2024	5,000		
Ivory Coast	Abidjan	Palais des Sports de Treichville	1978	3,500		
Kenya	Nairobi	Kasarani Indoor Arena	1987	5,000		
Kenya	Nairobi	Nyayo Indoor Gymnasium	1983	2,500		
Libya	Benghazi	Suliman Ad-Dharrath Arena	1967	10,000		
Libya	Tripoli	Great Hall				
Madagascar	Antananarivo	Palais des Sports Mahamasina		7,100		
Mali	Bamako	Pavillon des sports Modibo Keita	1960	3,000		
Morocco (List)	Casablanca	Salle Mohammed V	1981	12,000		
Morocco (List)	Rabat	Salle Moulay Abdellah	1983	10,000		
Morocco (List)	Rabat	Salle Ibn Yassine		5,000		
Morocco (List)	Fez	Salle 11th November		4,000		
Morocco (List)	Agadir	Salle Al Inbiâate		4,000		
Mozambique	Maputo	Pavilhão do Maxaquene	2011	5,000		
Namibia	Swakopmund	The Dome	2014	8,000		
Niger	Niamey	Palais du 29 Juillet				
Nigeria	Abuja	Abuja Sports Hall		3,000		
Nigeria	Lagos	National Stadium Indoor Hall	1961			
Nigeria	Port Harcourt	Rivers State Basketball Complex		3,000		
Nigeria	Kaduna	Ahmadu Bello Stadium	1965			
Rwanda	Kigali	BK Arena	2019	10,000		
Rwanda	Kigali	Lycée de Kigali	2023	1,500		
Rwanda	Kigali	Petit Stade		1,000		
Senegal	Dakar (Diamniadio)	Dakar Arena	2018	15,000		
South Africa (List)	Cape Town	Bellville Velodrome	1997	7,800		
South Africa (List)	Johannesburg	Ellis Park Arena	1990	6,300		
South Africa (List)	Johannesburg	Wembley Arena				
South Africa (List)	Durban	ICC Durban Arena	2007	10,000		
South Africa (List)	Pretoria	SunBet Arena	2017	8,500		
Tanzania	Dar es Salaam	Benjamin Mpaka National Indoor Stadium				
Tanzania	Dar es Salaam	IST Gymnasium				
Tanzania	Kibaha	The Filbert Bayi Olympafrica Centre	2013	2,500		
Tunisia (List)	Radès	Salle Omnisport de Radès	2004	17,000		
Tunisia (List)	Tunis	Salle El Menzah	1967	5,500		
Tunisia (List)	Nabeul	Salle Bir Challouf	2004	5,000		
Tunisia (List)	Monastir	Monastir Indoor Sports Hall	2006	5,000		
Tunisia (List)	Sfax	Raed Bejaoui Indoor Sports Hall		4,000		
Tunisia (List)	Sousse	Sousse Olympic Indoor Sports Hall	1987	3,000		
Tunisia (List)	Béni Khiar	Béni Khiar Indoor Sports Hall		3,000		
Tunisia (List)	Hammamet	Hammamet Indoor Sports Hall	2008	2,500		
Tunisia (List)	Aryanah	Aryanah Indoor Sports Hall		2,000		
Zimbabwe	Harare	City Sports Center		4,000		

== Future arenas ==
Country	Location	Arena	Broke ground	Capacity	Tenant/use	Image
Egypt	Hurghada	Hurghada Stadium Indoor Halls Complex	2021	3,000		
Egypt	Sharm El Sheikh	Sharm El-Sheikh Indoor Halls Complex	2021	3,000		
Democratic Republic of Congo	Kinshasa	Kinshasa Arena	2023	20,000		
Nigeria	Lagos	Lagos Arena	2024	12,000		
Nigeria	Benin City	Edo Arena	2024	6,000		

== See also ==
- Lists of stadiums
- List of stadiums by capacity
- List of football (soccer) stadiums by capacity
- List of indoor arenas by capacity
- List of indoor arenas in Europe
