= List of indoor arenas in Angola =

The following is a list of indoor arenas in Angola with capacity of at least 1,500 spectators. Most of the arenas in this list are for multi use proposes such as individual sports, team sports as well as cultural and political events.

== Currently in use ==
Location	Arena	Date built	Capacity	Tenants
Luanda	Pavilhão Anexo		1,500	
Luanda	Pavilhão Anexo II		1,500	
Luanda	Pavilhão da Cidadela		6,873	Petro de Luanda
Luanda	Pavilhão Dream Space		2,500	Recreativo do Libolo
Luanda	Pavilhão Multiusos do Kilamba	2013	12,720	
Luanda	Pavilhão Victorino Cunha		1,500	
Benguela	Pavilhão Acácias Rubras	2007	2,100	
Cabinda	Pavilhão do Tafe	2007	2,000	
Huambo	Pavilhão Serra Van-Dúnem	2007	2,010	
Lubango	Pavilhão Nossa Senhora do Monte	2007	2,000	
Malanje	Pavilhão Palanca Negra Gigante	2013	3,000	
Moçâmedes	Pavilhão Welwitschia Mirabilis	2013	3,072	

== See also ==
- List of football stadiums in Angola
- List of indoor arenas by capacity
