= 2007 FIBA Africa Clubs Champions Cup =

2007 FIBA Africa Champions Cup
22nd FIBA Africa Champions Cup

Tournament details
- Host country: Angola
- Dates: December 13 – 22
- Teams: 12 (from 53 federations)
- Venues: 3 (in 3 host cities)

Final positions
- Champions: Angola (1º de Agosto's 3rd title; Angola's 4th title)

Tournament statistics
- MVP: (Angola) Olímpio Cipriano
- Top scorer: (Nigeria) Usman 18.61
- Top rebounds: (Guinea) S.Condé 7.42
- Top assists: (Nigeria) Usman 5.3
- PPG (Team): (Angola) 1º Agosto 94
- RPG (Team): (Ivory Coast) ABC 32.28
- APG (Team): (Angola) 1º Agosto 20

Official website
- 2007 FIBA Africa Clubs Champions Cup

The 2007 FIBA Africa Basketball Club Championship (22nd edition), was an international basketball tournament held in the cities of Cabinda (Group A), Huambo (Group B) and Luanda (Knockout stage), Angola, from December 13 to 22, 2007. The tournament, organized by FIBA Africa, and hosted by Clube Desportivo Primeiro de Agosto, was contested by 12 teams split into 2 groups of 6, the first four of which qualifying for the knock-out stage.

Host team Primeiro de Agosto won the tournament.

== Draw ==
Group A	Group B
(Rwanda) APR (Democratic Republic of the Congo) ASB Kauka (Benin) ASPAC (Angola) Interclube (Guinea) MBC Conakry (Angola) Primeiro de Agosto	(Ivory Coast) Abidjan Basket Club (Democratic Republic of the Congo) BC Onatra (Mozambique) Ferroviário da Beira (Nigeria) Niger Potters (Angola) Petro Atlético (Mali) Stade Malien

== Preliminary round ==
Times given below are in UTC+1.

=== Group A ===
Qualified for the quarter-finals

	Group A	M	W	L	PF	PA	Diff	P
1.	(Angola) Primeiro de Agosto	5	5	0	479	301	+178	10
2.	(Angola) Interclube	5	4	1	381	346	+35	8
3.	(Rwanda) APR	5	4	1	348	322	+26	8
4.	(Democratic Republic of the Congo) ASB Kauka	5	2	3	304	312	-8	4
5.	(Guinea) MBC Conakry	5	1	4	303	354	−51	2
6.	(Benin) ASPAC	5	1	4	303	354	−51	2

December 13, 2007
17:00

Report

APR (Rwanda)	53–77	(Angola) Interclube
Scoring by quarter: 16–20, 17–20, 7–22, 13–15
Pts: three players 8 Rebs: Okwirry 6 Asts: Ntwari, Bazibanga 2		Pts: E.Camacho 16; Rebs: Selengue 7 Asts: Mokoteemapa 5

Pavilhão do Tafe, Cabinda

December 16, 2007
18:00

Report

ASB Kauka (Democratic Republic of the Congo)	60–78	(Angola) 1º de Agosto
Scoring by quarter: 10–24, 16–16, 15–17, 19–21
Pts: Mupanda 16; Rebs: Musamba 5 Asts: Ndombele 3		Pts: Jordão 18; Rebs: Mascarenhas 9 Asts: Mascarenhas 5

Pavilhão do Tafe, Cabinda

December 16, 2007
17:00

Report

MBC Conakry (Guinea)	64–57	(Benin) ASPAC
Scoring by quarter: 14-14, 15-19, 23-14, 12-10
Pts: S.Condé 22; Rebs: M.Condé 8 Asts: Camara 4		Pts: Quenum 19; Rebs: Borokini 7 Asts: three players 2

Pavilhão do Tafe, Cabinda

December 14, 2007
15:00

Report

ASB Kauka (Democratic Republic of the Congo)	48–53	(Guinea) MBC Conakry
Scoring by quarter: 16-9, 4-10, 12-14, 16-20
Pts: Kasongo 12; Rebs: Kasongo 9 Asts: Buzangu 3		Pts: S.Condé 14; Rebs: S.Condé 7 Asts: C.Conde 2

Pavilhão do Tafe, Cabinda

December 14, 2007
17:00

Report

Interclube (Angola)	46–55	(Angola) 1º de Agosto
Scoring by quarter: 15–11, 6–20, 12–18, 13–6
Pts: S.Panzo 11; Rebs: Selengue, Mokoteemapa 6 Asts: Mokoteemapa 3		Pts: Kikas, Olímpio 12; Rebs: Armando 8 Asts: Mascarenhas, Armando 3

Pavilhão do Tafe, Cabinda

December 14, 2007
19:00

Report

APR (Rwanda)	61–56	(Benin) ASPAC
Scoring by quarter: 16–13, 23-19, 10–10, 12–14
Pts: Okwirry 11; Rebs: Kabangu, Gakali 5 Asts: Okwirry 3		Pts: Quenum 20; Rebs: Borokini 9 Asts: four players 1

Pavilhão do Tafe, Cabinda

December 15, 2007
15:00

Report

Interclube (Angola)	94–46	(Benin) ASPAC
Scoring by quarter: 22–11, 34–15, 27–14, 11–6
Pts: E.Camacho 29; Rebs: three players 6 Asts: N.Sumbo 4		Pts: Quenum 28; Rebs: Quenum 7 Asts: three players 1

Pavilhão do Tafe, Cabinda

December 15, 2007
17:00

Report

1º de Agosto (Angola)	92–59	(Guinea) MBC Conakry
Scoring by quarter: 27–18, 17–16, 23–11, 25–14
Pts: Ambrósio 22; Rebs: Ambrósio 6 Asts: C.Almeida, Mayzer 3		Pts: Soumaoro 15; Rebs: M.Condé 5 Asts: Gueye 3

Pavilhão do Tafe, Cabinda

December 15, 2007
18:00

Report

APR (Rwanda)	53–61	(Democratic Republic of the Congo) ASB Kauka
Scoring by quarter: 16-17, 13-12, 12-14, 12-18
Pts: Ntwari 21; Rebs: Okwirry, Kimanuka 5 Asts: Nikobahoze 2		Pts: Mali 23; Rebs: Ngongo 13; Asts: Mualaba 4

Pavilhão do Tafe, Cabinda

December 17, 2007
15:00

Report

MBC Conakry (Guinea)	46–54	(Angola) Interclube
Scoring by quarter: 15-14, 11-15, 14-19, 6-16
Pts: M.Condé 16; Rebs: S.Condé 7 Asts: three players 2		Pts: Nascimento 15; Rebs: Nascimento 11; Asts: S.Panzo 4

Pavilhão do Tafe, Cabinda

December 17, 2007
17:00

Report

1º de Agosto (Angola)	131–52	(Rwanda) APR
Scoring by quarter: 35–17, 31–13, 35–5, 30–17
Pts: Olímpio 23; Rebs: Armando 5 Asts: Mascarenhas 7		Pts: Mwambay 8 Rebs: four players 3 Asts: Okwirry 4

Pavilhão do Tafe, Cabinda

December 17, 2007
18:00

Report

ASPAC (Benin)	45–77	(Democratic Republic of the Congo) ASB Kauka
Scoring by quarter: 15–26, 8–18, 16–12, 6–21
Pts: Quenum 19; Rebs: Borokini 4 Asts: Quenum, Nato 2		Pts: Mualaba 18; Rebs: Ngongo 6 Asts: Ndombele 4

Pavilhão do Tafe, Cabinda

December 18, 2007
15:00

Report

Interclube (Angola)	89–57	(Democratic Republic of the Congo) ASB Kauka
Scoring by quarter: 23–9, 21–13, 22–15, 23–20
Pts: V.Neto 18; Rebs: Nascimento 7 Asts: Nascimento 5		Pts: Mualaba 19; Rebs: Ngongo, Musamba 5 Asts: Mualaba 5

Pavilhão do Tafe, Cabinda

December 18, 2007
17:00

Report

ASPAC (Benin)	50–93	(Angola) 1º de Agosto
Scoring by quarter: 16–28, 10–25, 15–14, 9–26
Pts: Quenum 20; Rebs: Quenum 9 Asts: Honfoga 2		Pts: Mayzer 18; Rebs: Mascarenhas 6 Asts: Olímpio, Armando 5

Pavilhão do Tafe, Cabinda

December 18, 2007
19:00

Report

MBC Conakry (Guinea)	55–72	(Rwanda) APR
Scoring by quarter: 28–19, 11–11, 4–19, 12–23
Pts: M.Condé 15; Rebs: S.Condé 11; Asts: S.Condé, Keita 2		Pts: Ntwari 25; Rebs: Kabangu 6 Asts: three players 2

Pavilhão do Tafe, Cabinda

=== Group B ===
Qualified for the quarter-finals

	Group B	M	W	L	PF	PA	Diff	P
1.	(Angola) Petro Atlético	5	5	0	402	349	+53	10
2.	(Ivory Coast) Abidjan Basket Club	5	4	1	411	338	+73	9
3.	(Nigeria) Niger Potters	5	3	2	321	304	+17	8
4.	(Democratic Republic of the Congo) BC Onatra	5	1	4	302	348	-46	7
5.	(Mozambique) Ferroviário da Beira	5	1	4	303	354	−51	2
6.	(Mali) Stade Malien	5	1	4	303	354	−51	2

December 16, 2007
15:00

Report

Ferroviário Beira (Mozambique)	64–89	(Nigeria) Niger Potters
Scoring by quarter: 17–24, 16–20, 13–20, 18–25
Pts: Quicimusso 14; Rebs: Manhanga 11; Asts: Quicimusso 4		Pts: Gumut 27; Rebs: A.Yusuf 9 Asts: Usman 6

Pavilhão OS Van-Dúnem, Huambo

December 16, 2007
17:00

Report

Abidjan BC (Ivory Coast)	77–46	(Mali) Stade Malien
Scoring by quarter: 15–9, 16–14, 22–14, 24–9
Pts: S.Konaté 23; Rebs: Ebikoro 7 Asts: S.Konaté, Touali 4		Pts: Niambele 13; Rebs: four players 3 Asts: Kaba 3

Pavilhão OS Van-Dúnem, Huambo

December 13, 2007
19:00

Report

BC Onatra (Democratic Republic of the Congo)	53–85	(Angola) Petro Atlético
Scoring by quarter: 8–25, 13–17, 15–17, 17–26
Pts: Nzuzi 21; Rebs: Ndelo, Lukusa 7 Asts: Lukusa, Mbanzi 2		Pts: Kikas 23; Rebs: Jordão 6 Asts: Armando 4

Pavilhão OS Van-Dúnem, Huambo

December 13, 2007
14:00

Report

Abidjan BC (Ivory Coast)	89–22	(Mozambique) Ferroviário Beira
Scoring by quarter: 25–4, 16–4, 25–8, 23–6
Pts: S.Konaté 16; Rebs: Ebikoro 14; Asts: Amalabian, Touali 4		Pts: three players 4 Rebs: Baptista 6 Asts: five players 1

Pavilhão OS Van-Dúnem, Huambo

December 15, 2007
17:00

Report

BC Onatra (Democratic Republic of the Congo)	73–84	(Nigeria) Niger Potters
Scoring by quarter: 11–17, 26–18, 17–22, 19–27
Pts: Mulamba 21; Rebs: Ngandu 7 Asts: Samuna 5		Pts: Usman, Yusuf 21; Rebs: Oyalade 9 Asts: Usman 4

Pavilhão OS Van-Dúnem, Huambo

December 15, 2007
19:00

Report

Petro Atlético (Angola)	74–42	(Mali) Stade Malien
Scoring by quarter: 16–13, 20–8, 15–16, 23–5
Pts: Mingas, L.Costa 10; Rebs: Mingas 13; Asts: L.Costa 4		Pts: Ogunsola 10; Rebs: Niambele 6 Asts: Tangara, Simpara 3

Pavilhão OS Van-Dúnem, Huambo

December 14, 2007
17:00

Report

BC Onatra (Democratic Republic of the Congo)	52–85	(Ivory Coast) Abidjan BC
Scoring by quarter: 19–24, 10-14, 9-20, 14-27
Pts: Nzuzi 14; Rebs: Mulamba 6 Asts: Nzuzi 4		Pts: Tiene 17; Rebs: Tiene 13; Asts: Besse 4

Pavilhão OS Van-Dúnem, Huambo

December 14, 2007
15:00

Report

Stade Malien (Mali)	61–70 (OT)	(Mozambique) Ferroviário Beira
Scoring by quarter: 11–14, 13–10, 19–17, 14–16, Overtime: 4–13
Pts: Tangara 15; Rebs: Niambele 9 Asts: Diallo 3		Pts: Baptista 15; Rebs: Manhanga 11; Asts: Quicimusso 4

Pavilhão OS Van-Dúnem, Huambo

December 14, 2007
19:00

Report

Petro Atlético (Angola)	81–58	(Nigeria) Niger Potters
Scoring by quarter: 21–12, 18–17, 25–14, 17–15
Pts: C.Morais 17; Rebs: C.Morais 7 Asts: Crooks 5		Pts: Usman 19; Rebs: Gumut 7 Asts: 4 Usman 6

Pavilhão OS Van-Dúnem, Huambo

December 17, 2007
15:00

Report

Stade Malien (Mali)	51–74	(Democratic Republic of the Congo) BC Onatra
Scoring by quarter: 13–25, 14–13, 13–25, 11–11
Pts: Kone 10; Rebs: Niambele 8 Asts: Maiga 3		Pts: Lukusa 19; Rebs: Nzuzi 8 Asts: Samuna 5

Pavilhão OS Van-Dúnem, Huambo

December 17, 2007
17:00

Report

Niger Potters (Nigeria)	73–82	(Ivory Coast) Abidjan BC
Scoring by quarter: 13–18, 5–18, 14–23, 41–23
Pts: Yusuf 20; Rebs: Yusuf, Nwoye 7 Asts: Usman 3		Pts: ffi 22; Rebs: S.Konaté 4 Asts: Amalabian 3

Pavilhão OS Van-Dúnem, Huambo

December 17, 2007
19:00

Report

Ferroviário Beira (Mozambique)	32–97	(Angola) Petro Atlético
Scoring by quarter: 14–27, 4–18, 4–32, 10–20
Pts: Manheira 10; Rebs: Manhanga 6 Asts: Manheira 2		Pts: Crooks 13; Rebs: Mingas, Muzadi 9 Asts: Crooks 10

Pavilhão OS Van-Dúnem, Huambo

December 18, 2007
15:00

Report

Niger Potters (Nigeria)	73–68	(Mali) Stade Malien
Scoring by quarter: 12–16, 15–12, 26–19, 20–21
Pts: Gumut 18; Rebs: Gumut 10; Asts: Usman 6		Pts: Tangara 14; Rebs: three players 4 Asts: Tangara 3

Pavilhão OS Van-Dúnem, Huambo

December 18, 2007
17:00

Report

Ferroviário Beira (Mozambique)	41–75	(Democratic Republic of the Congo) BC Onatra
Scoring by quarter: 15–21, 4–18, 12–18, 10–18
Pts: Baptista 16; Rebs: three players 4 Asts: M.Manhanga, B.Manhanga 4		Pts: Nzuzi 26; Rebs: Mulamba 11; Asts: Lukusa 5

Pavilhão OS Van-Dúnem, Huambo

December 18, 2007
19:00

Report

Petro Atlético (Angola)	78–64	(Ivory Coast) Abidjan BC
Scoring by quarter: 22–21, 18–16, 20–10, 18–17
Pts: Mingas 20; Rebs: Mingas, Crooks 6 Asts: Crooks 4		Pts: Ninmol 14; Rebs: Ninmol 4 Asts: five players 1

Pavilhão OS Van-Dúnem, Huambo

== Knockout stage ==
9th-12th Place
Thursday, 20 December 15:00
(Mali) Stade Malien	45
(Guinea) MBC Conakry	57
Thursday, 20 December 17:00
(Benin) ASPAC	55
(Mozambique) Ferroviário Beira	50

9th place
Friday, 21 December 17:00
(Guinea) MBC Conakry	55
(Benin) ASPAC	50
11th place
Friday, 21 December 15:00
(Mali) Stade Malien	65
(Mozambique) Ferroviário Beira	45

Quarter-finals
Thursday, 20 December – 14:00
(Democratic Republic of the Congo) BC Onatra	46
(Angola) 1º de Agosto	104
Thursday, 20 December – 16:00
(Rwanda) APR	37
(Ivory Coast) Abidjan BC	81
Thursday, 20 December – 18:00
(Democratic Republic of the Congo) ASB Kauka	45
(Angola) Petro Atlético	79
Thursday, 20 December – 20:00
(Nigeria) Niger Potters	56
(Angola) Interclube	65

5th-8th Place
Friday, 21 December 14:00
(Democratic Republic of the Congo) BC Onatra	41
(Rwanda) APR	64
Friday, 21 December 16:00
(Democratic Republic of the Congo) ASB Kauka	79
(Nigeria) Niger Potters	83

5th place
Sunday, 22 December 14:00
(Rwanda) APR	74
(Nigeria) Niger Potters	93
7th place
Sunday, 22 December 09:00
(Democratic Republic of the Congo) BC Onatra	49
(Democratic Republic of the Congo) ASB Kauka	44

Quarter-finals
Thursday, 20 December – 14:00
(Democratic Republic of the Congo) BC Onatra	46
(Angola) 1º de Agosto	104
Thursday, 20 December – 16:00
(Rwanda) APR	37
(Ivory Coast) Abidjan BC	81
Thursday, 20 December – 18:00
(Democratic Republic of the Congo) ASB Kauka	45
(Angola) Petro Atlético	79
Thursday, 20 December – 20:00
(Nigeria) Niger Potters	56
(Angola) Interclube	65

Semi-finals
Friday, 21 December 18:00
(Angola) 1º de Agosto	68
(Ivory Coast) Abidjan BC	63
Friday, 21 December 20:00
(Angola) Petro Atlético	59
(Angola) Interclube	43

Final
Sunday, 22 December – 18:30
(Angola) 1º de Agosto	61
(Angola) Petro Atlético	53
Third place
Sunday, 22 December – 16:00
(Ivory Coast) Abidjan BC	60
(Angola) Interclube	56

=== Quarter-finals ===
December 20, 2007
14:00

Report

BC Onatra (Democratic Republic of the Congo)	46–104	(Angola) 1º de Agosto
Scoring by quarter: 18–21, 6–30, 5–31, 17–22
Pts: Tshimbanga 14; Rebs: Ndelo 6 Asts: five players 1		Pts: C.Almeida 21; Rebs: Ricardino 6 Asts: Armando 4

Pavilhão da Cidadela, Luanda

December 20, 2007
18:00

Report

ASB Kauka (Democratic Republic of the Congo)	45–79	(Angola) Petro Atlético
Scoring by quarter: 5–16, 12–27, 11–21, 17–15
Pts: Mali 21; Rebs: Mutombo 8 Asts: Ngongo, Mualaba 2		Pts: Muzadi, Mingas 15; Rebs: Leonel 9 Asts: Leonel 4

Pavilhão da Cidadela, Luanda

December 20, 2007
20:00

Report

Niger Potters (Nigeria)	56–65	(Angola) Interclube
Scoring by quarter: 11–27, 10–12, 21–13, 14–13
Pts: Usman 15; Rebs: Usman 7 Asts: Usman 4		Pts: E.Camacho 20; Rebs: Selengue 9 Asts: S.Panzo 4

Pavilhão da Cidadela, Luanda

December 20, 2007
16:00

Report

APR (Rwanda)	37–81	(Ivory Coast) Abidjan BC
Scoring by quarter: 10–23, 10–16, 4–15, 13–27
Pts: Okwirry 13; Rebs: three players 4 Asts: Ntwari 2		Pts: S.Konaté 15; Rebs: Ebikoro 8 Asts: S.Konaté 6

Pavilhão da Cidadela, Luanda

=== 9th-12th place ===
December 20, 2007
15:00

Report

Stade Malien (Mali)	45–57	(Guinea) MBC Conakry
Scoring by quarter: 11–15, 5–16, 13–8, 16–18
Pts: Tangara 12; Rebs: Kone, Diallo 4 Asts: Kone 3		Pts: Soumaoro 20; Rebs: C.Conde 9 Asts: M.Condé, Camara 3

Pavilhão do Tafe, Cabinda

December 20, 2007
17:00

Report

ASPAC (Benin)	55–50	(Mozambique) Ferroviário Beira
Scoring by quarter: 8–15, 16–10, 16–14, 15–11
Pts: Quenum 22; Rebs: Yarou 6 Asts: Honfoga 4		Pts: Lon, Tembo 10; Rebs: Tembo 5 Asts: Quicimusso 5

Pavilhão do Tafe, Cabinda

=== 5th-8th place ===
December 21, 2007
14:00

Report

BC Onatra (Democratic Republic of the Congo)	41–64	(Rwanda) APR
Scoring by quarter: 6–17, 14–9, 5–11, 16–27
Pts: Nzuzi 23; Rebs: Tshimbanga 7 Asts: Nzuzi 4		Pts: Ntwari 16; Rebs: Kabange 10; Asts: Nikobahoze 4

Pavilhão da Cidadela, Luanda

December 21, 2007
16:00

Report

ASB Kauka (Democratic Republic of the Congo)	79–83	(Nigeria) Niger Potters
Scoring by quarter: 14–29, 24–13, 18–13, 23–28
Pts: Buzangu 30; Rebs: Ndombele 6 Asts: Buzangu, Ndombele 3		Pts: Usman 26; Rebs: Sati 5 Asts: Usman, A.Yusuf 3

Pavilhão da Cidadela, Luanda

=== Semifinals ===
December 21, 2007
18:00

Report

1º de Agosto (Angola)	68–63	(Ivory Coast) Abidjan BC
Scoring by quarter: 19–16, 18–9, 20–13, 11–25
Pts: Kikas 15; Rebs: Kikas, Jordão 8 Asts: Olímpio 3		Pts: Ninmol 19; Rebs: Ninmol 7 Asts: S.Konaté, Touali 2

Pavilhão da Cidadela, Luanda

December 21, 2007
20:00

Report

Petro Atlético (Angola)	59–43	(Angola) Interclube
Scoring by quarter: 9–6, 17–14, 17–9, 16–14
Pts: Leonel 13; Rebs: Mingas 10; Asts: Mílton 3		Pts: S.Panzo 13; Rebs: Selengue 8 Asts: S.Santos, A.Câmara 1

Pavilhão da Cidadela, Luanda

=== 11th place ===
December 21, 2007
15:00

Report

Stade Malien (Mali)	65–45	(Mozambique) Ferroviário Beira
Scoring by quarter: 4–9, 24–8, 14–13, 23–15
Pts: Tangara 15; Rebs: Dembele 13; Asts: Maiga 5		Pts: Manheira 16; Rebs: Baptista 4 Asts: Baptista 3

Pavilhão do Tafe, Cabinda

=== 9th place ===
December 21, 2007
17:00

Report

MBC Conakry (Guinea)	55–50	(Benin) ASPAC
Scoring by quarter: 15–8, 15–15, 7–18, 18–9
Pts: Gueye 12; Rebs: S.Condé 10; Asts: M.Condé 3		Pts: R.Quenum 19; Rebs: Quenum 7 Asts: Hounnou 3

Pavilhão do Tafe, Cabinda

=== 7th place ===
December 22, 2007
09:00

Report

BC Onatra (Democratic Republic of the Congo)	49–44	(Democratic Republic of the Congo) ASB Kauka
Scoring by quarter: 12–9, 12–13, 13–14, 12–8
Pts: Nzuzi 16; Rebs: Mulamba 11; Asts: Ngandu, Badio 2		Pts: Mali 12; Rebs: Ngongo 10; Asts: Ndombele 4

Pavilhão da Cidadela, Luanda

=== 5th place ===
December 22, 2007
14:00

Report

APR (Rwanda)	74–93	(Nigeria) Niger Potters
Scoring by quarter: 13–14, 14–27, 27–27, 20–25
Pts: Okwirry 20; Rebs: Okwirry, Ntwari 6 Asts: Nikobahoze 7		Pts: Usman 30; Rebs: Sati 5 Asts: Gumut 4

Pavilhão da Cidadela, Luanda

=== Bronze medal game ===
December 22, 2007
16:00

Report

Abidjan BC (Ivory Coast)	60–56	(Angola) Interclube
Scoring by quarter: 8–13, 16–13, 16–20, 20–10
Pts: Ninmol, S.Konaté 16; Rebs: Ninmol 6 Asts: Amalabian 3		Pts: Nascimento 13; Rebs: Nascimento 8 Asts: S.Panzo 7

Pavilhão da Cidadela, Luanda

=== Gold medal game ===
December 22, 2007
18:30

Report

1º de Agosto (Angola)	61–53	(Angola) Petro Atlético
Scoring by quarter: 19–17, 14–8, 14–12, 14–16
Pts: Lutonda 13; Rebs: Mascarenhas 10; Asts: Jordão 3		Pts: Crooks 18; Rebs: Mingas 6 Asts: Crooks 5

Pavilhão da Cidadela, Luanda

== Final standings ==
Rank	Team	Record
Gold medal	(Angola) Primeiro de Agosto	8–0
Silver medal	(Angola) Petro Atlético	7–1
Bronze medal	(Ivory Coast) Abidjan Basket Club	6–2
4	(Angola) Interclube	5–3
5	(Nigeria) Niger Potters	5–3
6	(Rwanda) APR	5–3
7	(Democratic Republic of the Congo) BC Onatra	2–6
8	(Democratic Republic of the Congo) ASB Kauka	2–6
9	(Guinea) MBC Conakry	3–4
10	(Benin) ASPAC	2–5
11	(Mali) Stade Malien	2–5
12	(Mozambique) Ferroviário da Beira	1–6

Primeiro de Agosto roster
Abdel Bouckar, Armando Costa, Carlos Almeida, Felizardo Ambrósio, Francisco Jordão, Joaquim Gomes, Marques Houtman, Mayzer Alexandre, Miguel Lutonda, Olímpio Cipriano, Rodrigo Mascarenhas, Vladimir Ricardino, Coach: Jaime Covilhã

== All Tournament Team ==
G	(United States) Shannon Crooks
F	(Angola) Olímpio Cipriano
F	(Ivory Coast) Stéphane Konaté
C	(Angola) Joaquim Gomes "Kikas
C	(Angola) Eduardo Mingas

2007 FIBA Africa Clubs Champions Cup

Clube Desportivo Primeiro de Agosto
3rd Title

Most Valuable Player
(Angola) Olímpio Cipriano

== See also ==
- 2007 FIBA Africa Championship
