= 2008 African Men's Handball Championship =

2008 African Men's Championship
Tournament details
- Host country: Angola
- Venues: 3 (in 3 host cities)
- Dates: 8–17 January
- Teams: 8 (from 1 confederation)

Final positions
- Champions: Egypt (5th title)
- Runners-up: Tunisia
- Third place: Algeria
- Fourth place: Angola

Tournament statistics
- Matches played: 40
- Goals scored: 2,326 (58.15 per match)
- Top scorer: (Egypt) Ahmed El-Ahmar (32 goals)

Awards
- Best player: (Egypt) Ahmed El-Ahmar

The 2008 African Men's Handball Championship was the 18th edition of the African Men's Handball Championship, held in Angola, from 8 to 17 January 2008. It acted as the African qualifying tournament for the 2008 Summer Olympics in Beijing and the 2009 World Championship in Croatia.

Egypt win their fifth title beating Tunisia in the final game 27–25.

== Qualified teams ==
- Algeria
- Angola (hosts)
- Cameroon
- DR Congo
- Egypt
- Morocco
- Nigeria
- Tunisia

== Venues ==
Luanda	Cabinda
Pavilhão da Cidadela	Pavilhão do Tafe
Capacity: 6,873	Capacity: 2,000
Lubango	2008 African Men's Handball Championship is located in Angola
Pavilhão Nossa Senhora do Monte	2008 African Men's Handball Championship is located in Angola
Capacity: 2,000	2008 African Men's Handball Championship is located in Angola

== Group stage ==
All times are local (UTC+1).

Team advance to the knockout stage

=== Group A ===
Team	Pld	W	D	L	GF	GA	GD	Pts
Tunisia	3	3	0	0	95	68	+27	6
Angola (H)	3	1	0	2	81	83	−2	2
Cameroon	3	1	0	2	82	87	−5	2
DR Congo	3	1	0	2	83	103	−20	2

(H) Hosts

10 January 2008; 16:00	Tunisia	29–24	Cameroon	Pavilhão do Tafe, Cabinda
10 January 2008; 16:00		(14–14)		Pavilhão do Tafe, Cabinda

10 January 2008; 18:00	Angola	30–33	DR Congo	Pavilhão do Tafe, Cabinda
10 January 2008; 18:00		(14–14)		Pavilhão do Tafe, Cabinda

11 January 2008; 16:00	Cameroon	31–27	DR Congo	Pavilhão do Tafe, Cabinda
11 January 2008; 16:00		(17–13)		Pavilhão do Tafe, Cabinda

11 January 2008; 18:00	Tunisia	24–20	Angola	Pavilhão do Tafe, Cabinda
11 January 2008; 18:00		(13–10)		Pavilhão do Tafe, Cabinda

12 January 2008; 16:00	Tunisia	42–23	DR Congo	Pavilhão do Tafe, Cabinda
12 January 2008; 16:00		(22–12)		Pavilhão do Tafe, Cabinda

12 January 2008; 16:00	Angola	31–26	Cameroon	Pavilhão do Tafe, Cabinda
12 January 2008; 16:00		(14–10)		Pavilhão do Tafe, Cabinda

=== Group B ===
Team	Pld	W	D	L	GF	GA	GD	Pts
Egypt	3	3	0	0	90	65	+25	6
Algeria	3	2	0	1	75	65	+10	4
Morocco	3	1	0	2	71	82	−11	2
Nigeria	3	0	0	3	65	89	−24	0

10 January 2008; 16:00	Egypt	26–23	Algeria	Pavilhão Nossa Senhora do Monte, Lubango
10 January 2008; 16:00		(14–13)		Pavilhão Nossa Senhora do Monte, Lubango

10 January 2008; 18:00	Morocco	30–25	Nigeria	Pavilhão Nossa Senhora do Monte, Lubango
10 January 2008; 18:00		(18–10)		Pavilhão Nossa Senhora do Monte, Lubango

11 January 2008; 16:00	Egypt	31–22	Morocco	Pavilhão Nossa Senhora do Monte, Lubango
11 January 2008; 16:00		(15–10)		Pavilhão Nossa Senhora do Monte, Lubango

11 January 2008; 18:00	Algeria	26–20	Nigeria	Pavilhão Nossa Senhora do Monte, Lubango
11 January 2008; 18:00		(14–9)		Pavilhão Nossa Senhora do Monte, Lubango

12 January 2008; 16:00	Egypt	33–20	Nigeria	Pavilhão Nossa Senhora do Monte, Lubango
12 January 2008; 16:00		(12–10)		Pavilhão Nossa Senhora do Monte, Lubango

12 January 2008; 18:00	Algeria	26–19	Morocco	Pavilhão Nossa Senhora do Monte, Lubango
12 January 2008; 18:00		(17–9)		Pavilhão Nossa Senhora do Monte, Lubango

== Knockout stage ==
Semifinals
15 January – Luanda
Egypt	35
Angola	27
15 January – Luanda
Tunisia	41
Algeria	25

Final
17 January – Luanda
Egypt	27
Tunisia	25
Third place
17 January – Luanda
Angola	20
Algeria	23

5–8 place bracket

Semifinals
14 January – Cabinda
DR Congo	30
Morocco	28
14 January – Cabinda
Nigeria (ET)	37
Cameroon	36

Final
15 January – Cabinda
DR Congo	31
Nigeria	30
Third place
15 January – Cabinda
Morocco	23
Cameroon	32

=== 5–8th place bracket ===
14 January 2008; 17:00	DR Congo	30–28	Morocco	Pavilhão do Tafe, Cabinda
14 January 2008; 17:00		(16–11)		Pavilhão do Tafe, Cabinda

February 19
19:30 UTC+2
Nigeria
37–36 (ET)
Cameroon
Pavilhão do Tafe, Cabinda

(15–18)

FT: 31–31 ET: 2–2, 4–3

=== Semifinals ===
15 January 2008; 14:00	Tunisia	41–25	Algeria	Pavilhão da Cidadela, Luanda
15 January 2008; 14:00		(17–11)		Pavilhão da Cidadela, Luanda

15 January 2008; 18:00	Egypt	35–28	Angola	Pavilhão da Cidadela, Luanda; Attendance: 4000
15 January 2008; 18:00		(19–14)		Pavilhão da Cidadela, Luanda; Attendance: 4000
15 January 2008; 18:00		ANGOP		Pavilhão da Cidadela, Luanda; Attendance: 4000

- Angola: Yuri Fernandes (2), André Cassapi (0), Filipovic (2), António (1), Marcelino Nascimento (4), Belchior Kamuanga (6), Pedro Neto (3), Paulo Pereira (1), Francisco Marçal (2), Custódio Gouveia (1), Manuel Dias (1), Sérgio Lopes (2), Jaime Barreiros (3), Sérgio Morgado, Giovane Muachissengue. Coach: Beto Ferreira
- Egypt: Hussein Awaad Mabrouk (1), Hussein A (3), Moustafa (4), Ahmed Moustafa Nasr El-Ahmar (10), Mohamed (2), Amr Elra (1), Abou Wellal (4), Mohamed I (2), Belal Awaad Mabrouk (4), Hany Shab (4), Husseim Amir (0), Walidi Mor (0). Coach: Irfan Smajlagić

=== Seventh place game ===
15 January 2008; 15:00	Cameroon	32–23	Morocco	Pavilhão do Tafe, Cabinda
15 January 2008; 15:00		(20–11)		Pavilhão do Tafe, Cabinda

=== Fifth place game ===
15 January 2008; 17:00	DR Congo	31–30	Nigeria	Pavilhão do Tafe, Cabinda
15 January 2008; 17:00		(14–15)		Pavilhão do Tafe, Cabinda

=== Third place game ===
16 January 2008; 18:00	Algeria	23–20	Angola	Pavilhão da Cidadela, Luanda
16 January 2008; 18:00		(11–11)		Pavilhão da Cidadela, Luanda

=== Final ===
17 January 2008; 20:00	Egypt	27–25	Tunisia	Pavilhão da Cidadela, Luanda
17 January 2008; 20:00		(12–16)		Pavilhão da Cidadela, Luanda

== Final ranking ==
Qualified for the 2008 Summer Olympics & the 2009 World Championship
Qualified for the 2008 Summer Olympics Qualifier & the 2009 World Championship

Rank	Team
Gold medal	Egypt
Silver medal	Tunisia
Bronze medal	Algeria
4	Angola
5	DR Congo
6	Nigeria
7	Cameroon
8	Morocco
