= Manuel Rui =

Angolan writer and poet

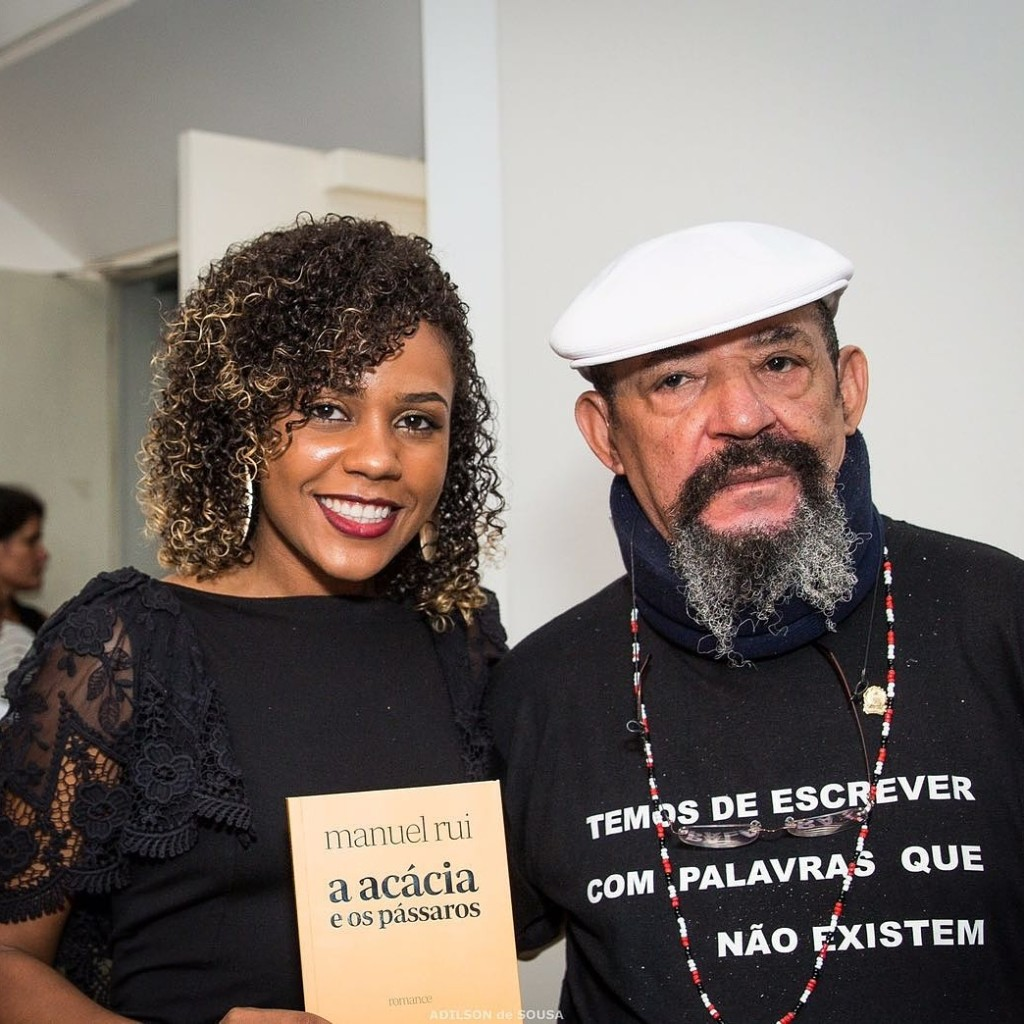
- Rui with singer Lípsia
- Born: Manuel Rui Alves Monteiro; November 4, 1941 (age 84); Nova Lisboa, Angola
- Education: University of Coimbra
- Writing career
- Language: Portuguese
- Notable works: "Angola Avante!", Quem Me Dera Ser Onda

Angola Representative at the Organization of African Unity

Angola Representative at the United Nations

MPLA Minister of Information
- In office 1974–?

Manuel Rui Alves Monteiro (born 4 November 1941) is an Angolan writer of poetry, novels, theater plays, and short stories. He has been described as "the chronicler par excellence of postindependence Angola" through fiction that offers "subtle, complex, pointed, and oftentimes humorous portrayals of Angola since the early years of the MPLA euphoria, in which he played a political role."

== Life and career ==
Manuel Rui was born in 1941 in Huambo (then Nova Lisboa), capital of Angola. He received his primary and secondary education in Huambo. He studied at the University of Coimbra, in Portugal, and received a law degree there in 1969. As a student, Rui participated in literary and political events and was jailed for two months in Portugal. He practiced law in Coimbra during the nationalist struggle for independence in Angola. He was on the editorial board of Vértice, the journal of the Center of Literary Studies in Coimbra, where he published his first prose fiction works in the early 1970s. In addition, he was part of the board of Editora Centelha and worked for the Centro de Estudos Literários da Associação Académica de Coimbra.

In the aftermath of the Portuguese military coup on April 25, 1974, Rui returned to Angola to serve as the MPLA Minister of Information in the transitional government established by the Alvor Agreement. He then served as Angola's first representative to the Organization of African Unity and the United Nations, and as rector of the University of Nova Lisboa. He also directed the MPLA's Department of Revolutionary Orientation and Department of Foreign Affairs. He wrote the lyrics of Angola's first national anthem, "Angola Avante!", the Angolan version of "The Internationale".

Rui's 1982 book Quem Me Dera Ser Onda has been described as "a classic of Angolan (and Lusophone African) literature". The work satirically addressed the social problems of the time and has been translated into several languages. He frequently wrote for Angolan newspapers and magazines and has published some children's books. Rui has taught at the University of Huambo and is one of the leading Angolan novelists.

== Selected works ==
=== Theater plays ===
- O Espantalho (The Scarecrow, 1973)
- Meninos de Huambo (Children of Huambo, 1985)

=== Poetry ===
- A Onda (The Wave, 1973)
- Cinco Vezes Cinco (Five Times Five, 1986)

=== Prose ===
- Regresso Adiado (Delayed Return; short stories, 1973)
- Sim, Camarada! (Yes, Comrade!; short stories, 1977)
- Quem Me Dera Ser Onda (I Wish I Were a Wave; novella, 1982)
- A Crónica de um Mujimbo (The Chronicle of a Rumor; novel, 1989)
- O Manequim e o Piano (The Mannequin and the Piano; novel, 2005)
- Quitandeiras & aviões (short stories, 2013)
