= 2004 FIBA Africa Clubs Champions Cup squads =

This article displays the rosters for the participating teams at the 2004 FIBA Africa Club Championship.

== Abidjan Basket Club ==
Source:

== AS Douanes ==
Source:

== Al Ahly ==
Source:

== Ebun Comets ==
Source:

== Petro Atlético ==
- Cristo
- F.Horácio
- Gerson
- H.Ortet
- H.Mbunga
- Kiteculo
- J.Tati
- Nascimento
- Selengue
- Belarmino
- S.Panzo
- Coach Raúl Duarte

== Primeiro de Agosto ==
Source:

== Stade Malien ==
Source:
