= Audio Darts =

- Highest governing body: WDF
- First played: approx 1988
- Registered players: ~50

Characteristics
- Contact: No
- Team members: Team events exist
- Mixed-sex: No gender division
- Type: Target sports, Disabled sports, Individual sport
- Equipment: Set of 3 darts, dartboard

Presence
- Olympic: No

Audio Darts is a variation of soft tipped darts in which players wear blindfolds. Also, the toeboard is raised, so you can feel it with your toes, and the dart board has a voice that announces all the things that are typically displayed in lites. Sighted spotters are used to announce the position of darts that miss the board and help find dart that fall on the floor.

== History ==
In 1988 the Braille Sports Foundation (BSF), whose mission is to increase accessibility for individuals with visual impairment, was looking for a way for people with visual impairments to participate in the game of darts. After approximately one year of research and development, an Audio English Mark Dart machine was created. This machine enabled unsighted people to effectively compete in the game of darts against sighted and unsighted opponents. Arachnid made only 50 of Audio English Mark Dart machines and not many of them still exist.

DMI's e750, licensed from Arachnid, speaks almost enough to play blind.

The Audio Dart Master was introduced in 2009 with full voice functionality.

== Leagues ==
The game is played in a few leagues.

=== Twin Cities Audio Dart League ===
The Twin Cities Blind Audio Dart League is organized to promote darts in a recreational, competitive community setting for disabled and non-disabled persons.
