= List of indoor arenas in Egypt =

The following is a list of indoor arenas in Egypt, with a capacity of at least 1,500 spectators. Most of the arenas in this list have multiple uses such as individual sports, team sports as well as cultural events and political events.

== Current arenas ==
#	Image	Arenas	Capacity	City	Tenants
1		Cairo Stadium Indoor Halls Complex	16,900	Cairo	Egyptian Olympic Committee
2		Olympic City Hall 1	15,000	Olympic City, New Administrative Capital	
3		Olympic City Hall 2	8,000	Olympic City, New Administrative Capital	
4		Sports City Hall	7,000	New Administrative Capital	
5		Hassan Moustafa Sports Hall	5,200	6th of October	
6		Borg El Arab Sports Hall	5,000	Borg El Arab	
7		Port Said Hall	5,000	Port Said	
8		Abdulrahman Fawzi Hall	4,000	Cairo	Zamalek SC
9		Al Ahly Sports Hall	2,500	Cairo	Al Ahly SC
10		Cairo Sports Hall II	1,620	Cairo	Gezira BC

== See also ==
- List of indoor arenas in Africa
- List of football stadiums in Egypt
- Lists of stadiums
