= List of indoor arenas in Algeria =

The following is a list of indoor arenas in Algeria with a capacity of at least 1,000 spectators. Most of the arenas in this list have organized multiple International and Continental individual sports, team sports events like African Games, Mediterranean Games, Arab Games. The indoor stadiums also serve as a cultural events and political events hub.

== Currently in use ==
#	Image	Arenas	Capacity	City	Tenants
1		Hacène Harcha Arena	8,000	Algiers	MC Alger
2		Miloud Hadefi Omnisport Arena	7,000	Oran	MC Oran
3		La Coupole Arena	5,500	Algiers	
4		Hamou Boutlélis Sports Palace	5,000	Oran	MC Oran, ASM Oran
5		24 February Indoor Hall	3,000	Oran	ES Arzew
6		Shahlef Shahr Edin Palace	3,000	Annaba	
7		Mohamed Berchech Sports hall	2,000	Constantine	
8		Ben Aknoun Multisports Hall (Note: Ben Aknoun Arena is a retractable roof Multisports Hall the only one of its kind in African continent)	1,500	Algiers	

== See also ==
- List of indoor arenas in Africa
- List of football stadiums in Algeria
- Lists of stadiums
