= List of indoor arenas in South Africa =

The following is a list of indoor arenas in South Africa, with a capacity of at least 4,000 Spectators. Most of the arenas in this list have multiple uses such as individual sports, team sports as well as cultural events and political events.

== Current arenas ==
Location	Arena	Date built	Capacity	Image
Pretoria	SunBet Arena	2017	10,000	
Pretoria	Heartfelt Arena		8,000	
Durban	ICC Durban Arena	1997	10,000	
Cape Town	Bellville Velodrome	1997	7,800	
Cape Town	Cape Town International Convention Centre	2003	6,200	
Johannesburg	Ellis Park Arena	1990	6,300	

== Former / demolished ==
Location	Arena	Date built	Capacity	Image
Cape Town	Good Hope Centre	1976	7,000	
Johannesburg	WeBuyCars Dome	1998	20,000	

== Under construction ==
Rivers of living waters Arena in Vereeeniging Unitas park.

== See also ==
- List of indoor arenas in Africa
- List of football stadiums in South Africa
- Lists of stadiums
