= Gabriela Antunes =

- Born: 8 July 1937; Nova Lisboa, Portuguese Angola, (now Huambo, Angola)
- Died: 3 April 2004 (aged 66); Lisbon, Portugal
- Education: University of Lisbon
- Occupation: Writer

Gabriela Antunes (8 July 1937 - 3 April 2004) was an Angolan writer and educator.

== Biography ==
Antunes was born on 8 July 1937 in Huambo. After completing secondary school in Huambo, she moved to Lisbon in 1955. She obtained a bachelor's degree in linguistics in Germany. Antunes earned a postgraduate degree in Education and English in Luanda. She began working at the Sarmento Rodrigues Commercial and Industrial School, and in 1964 was hired at the English and German Commercial Institute of Luanda. She also taught at the Superior Private Institute of Angola. Antunes was the UNESCO Coordinator of Portuguese in Angola. In addition, she was the director of the Angolan National Library.

Gabriela Antunes was professor and journalism program coordinator at the High Institute of Luanda Economics. In the sports field, she achieved the position of chairman of the general meeting of the Angolan Swimming Federation. In 1980, she changed jobs from the Ministry of Education to the Ministry of Culture, headed at the time by António Jacinto. At this point, she became more interested in children's literature. Antunes joined the Angolan Writers Union (UEA) in June 1984. In 1986, she hosted a children's program on the Public Television of Angola. She participated in several seminars and conferences in Africa, America and Europe as well as in the first Biennial, held in December 1995.

One of her best known works is Histórias Velhas, Roupa Nova or Estórias velhas, roupa nova, a collection of four children's stories. She wrote several works adapting traditional tales for children, and asserted that her mission was "to tell them of their things, their land, beauty and people."

Antunes was also a noted human rights activist and promoter of the Portuguese language. She died on 3 April 2004 in Lisbon while awaiting medical treatment. On 8 April, Antunes was buried at the Alto Cemetery das Cruzes, in Luanda. President of the National Assembly Roberto de Almeida was in attendance at the funeral, and President José Eduardo dos Santos sent a letter of condolence.

== Awards and recognition ==
- She won the Culture Award from the Cultural Foundation of the Portuguese Language in 1999 for her contributions to Portuguese language literature.
- On 25 February 2000, she was honored at the Camões Institute, the Embassy of Portugal in Angola, in recognition of her literary work.

== Bibliography ==
Notable works are as follows:

- A Águia, a Rola, as Galinhas e os 50 Lwei. Written with Rosalina Pombal. Luanda: INALD, 1982. (Children's stories).
- Kibala, o rei leão. Luanda: INALD, 1982.
- O Castigo do Dragão Glutão. Luanda: INALD, n/d.
- Histórias Velhas, Roupa Nova. Luanda: INALD, n/d. 1988. (Short stories).
- O Cubo Amarelo. Luanda: UEA, 1991. (Novel).
- Crónicas apressadas: ano um. Luanda: Instituto Nacional das Indústrias Culturais - INIC, 2002.
