= José Eduardo dos Santos University =

Public university in Huambo, Angola

- Type: Public research university
- Established: 10 June 1974; 52 years ago
- Rector: Cristóvão de Carvalho Ferreira Simões
- Location: Huambo, Angola; 12°46′26″S 15°44′49″E
- Campus: Urban
- Website: www.ujes.co.ao

The José Eduardo dos Santos University (UJES; Portuguese: Universidade José Eduardo dos Santos) is an Angolan public university based in the city of Huambo.

Formerly one of the Agostinho Neto University campuses, it was separated in the process of reforms to Angolan higher education that took place in 2008 and 2009.

The university's base territory is the Huambo Province.

== Name origin ==
The university honors José Eduardo Van Dunén dos Santos, the anti-colonial leader who became Angola's third president, as well as the country's longest-serving head of state.

== Historic ==
The historical tradition of the UJES begins with the "General University Studies of Angola" (begun in Luanda in 1962). In 1966, the "Delegation of General Studies of Angola in Nova Lisboa" was installed in Huambo, offering university courses in veterinary medicine, agronomy and forestry. In 1968, the Delegation of Nova Lisboa was annexed to the "University of Luanda".

In June 1974, the High Commissioner for Angola and the then Minister of Education of the Transitional Government split the University of Luanda into three universities, with the delegation being transformed into the University of Nova Lisboa. Manuel Rui Alves Monteiro was even designated as rector, but the decrees were annulled shortly afterwards.

From 1976 onwards, the "Huambo Delegation" became linked to the new University of Angola (currently Agostinho Neto University), already in the country's post-independence period.

In 1980, the campus is transformed into the Higher Institute of Education Science (ISCED) in Huambo, by decree nº 95 of 30 August of the Council of Ministers. The ISCED, in turn, became linked, from 1988 onwards, to a larger institution, the "Huambo University Center" (CUHua).

In 2008/2009, within the scope of the Angolan Government's program for higher education, in accordance with article 16 of decree nº 7/09 of 12 May, the José Eduardo dos Santos University (UJES) was created as a public higher education institution, from the transformation of the former "Huambo University Center"; in the same act, the ISCED of Huambo becomes an autonomous institution detached from the UJES, becoming the Higher Institute of Education Science of Huambo.

By presidential decree 285, of 29 October 2020 — which reorganizes the Network of Public Higher Education Institutions of Angola (RIPES) — the Cuíto and Luena campuses, previously linked to UJES, became autonomous.
