= List of indoor arenas in Morocco =

The following is a list of indoor arenas in Morocco.

== Current ==
Location	Arena	Date built	Capacity	Tenants	Image
Casablanca	Salle Mohammed V		12,000	Raja (basketball), Wydad (basketball)	
Rabat	Salle Moulay Abdellah		10,000		
Rabat	Salle Ibn Yassine		5,000		
Agadir	Salle Al Inbiâate		4,000		
Fez	Salle 11th November		4,000	MAS (basketball)	
Nador	Salle Omnisports Nador		4,000		
Tetouan	Salle Omnisports Tetouan		4,000		
Tangier	Salle Omnisports Ziaten	2009	4,000	IRT (basketball), Majd (basketball)	
Essaouira	Salle Omnisports Essaouira	2009	3,000		
Kenitra	Salle Al Wahda		2,500		
Salé	Salle El Bouâzzaoui		2,000	AS Salé (basketball)	
Tangier	Salle Badr		1,500		
Oujda	Salle Omnisports d'Oujda	2009	1,500		
El Jadida	Salle Najib Naâmi		1,000		
Zaio	Salle Omnisports Zaio		1,000		

== See also ==
- List of indoor arenas in Africa
- Lists of stadiums
