= Inkosi Albert Luthuli International Convention Centre =

Convention centre in Durban, South Africa

Inkosi Albert Luthuli International Convention Centre Complex
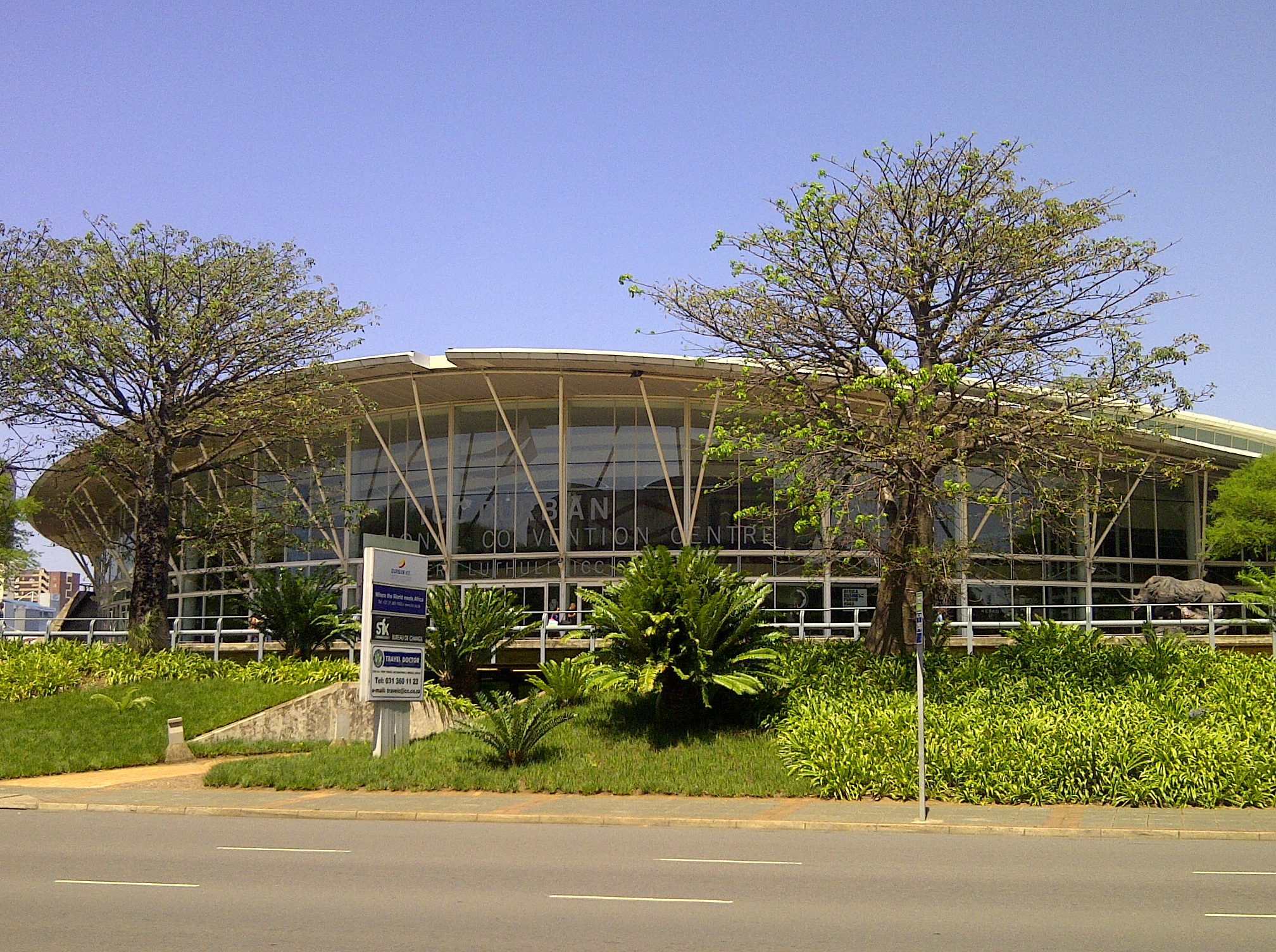
- Exterior of venue c.2014
- Interactive map of Inkosi Albert Luthuli International Convention Centre Complex
- Former names: Durban International Convention Centre Complex (1997–2007)
- Address: 45 Bram Fischer Rd; Durban 4001; South Africa
- Location: Durban City Centre
- Coordinates: 29°51′13″S 31°1′48″E
- Owner: ICC Durban (Pty) Ltd.

Construction
- Opened: 8 August 1997
- Renovated: 2000, 2004, 2005

Website
- Venue Website

The Inkosi Albert Luthuli International Convention Centre Complex, often abbreviated as ICC Durban, is a large events facility located in the city centre of Durban, KwaZulu-Natal, South Africa. It is named after 1960 Nobel Peace Prize laureate and former president of the African National Congress, Inkosi Albert Luthuli.

Opened by former president Nelson Mandela in 1997, the Durban ICC was South Africa’s first International Convention Centre and has played a pioneering role in attracting international events to Durban since its inception. The complex is composed of an arena, hotel, convention and exhibition centre.

The venue has hosted various high-level conferences and meetings since its inception, namely: the International AIDS Conference in 2000 and again in July 2016; the 1999 Commonwealth Heads of Government Meeting; and the Non-Aligned Movement in 2004. It hosted the preliminary draw for the 2010 FIFA World Cup and final draw for 2013 African Cup of Nations. It also hosted the COP17 meeting in 2011 and the 5th Global Conference on the Elimination of Child Labour in 2022.

== History ==
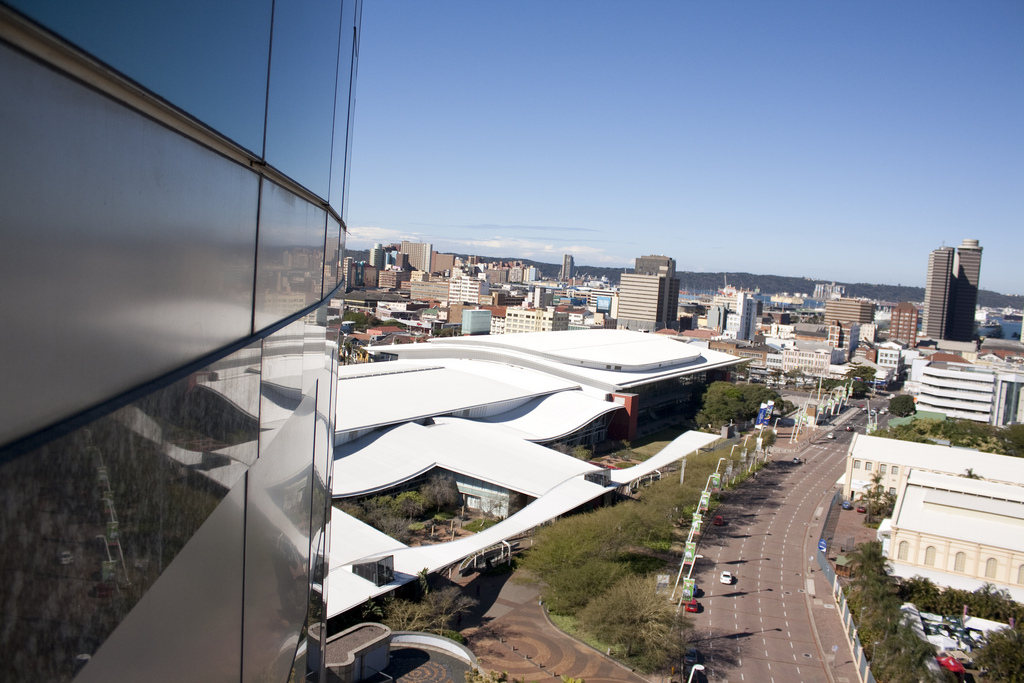
View of the ICC from the adjoining Hilton Hotel

Discussions in the city of Durban on the merits of a major convention centre date back to the 1960s. However, planning for the convention centre began in 1991. After consultations by the whites-only municipal authorities with unrepresented political groupings in 1993, construction commenced in 1994. The Convention Centre hosted the 123rd IOC Session where Pyeongchang was elected host city of the 2018 Winter Olympics.

It was proposed on 1 February 2006 that the name of the centre be changed from Durban International Convention Centre to its current name.

== Facilities ==
- Durban International Convention Centre: The main facility of the complex. Its design allows the centre to be converted into 22 individual halls.
  - Hall of Stars: A plenary-styled auditorium that can seat over 1,500 guests.
  - Fig Tree Courtyard: An outdoor event space with an adjoining lawn area. Used for cocktail parties, banquets and small weddings.
- Durban ICC Arena: The arena and main event center of the complex. It is composed of Halls 4–6 of the Durban ICC. Depending on configuration, it can seat anywhere from 3,000–10,000. Construction began in 2004 and the arena opened 20 March 2007. The arena cost R460 million. Many international acts have performed at the arena, including: George Benson, Al Jarreau, Mary J. Blige, Josh Groban, Michael Buble, Enrique Iglesias, and Migos. Events he!d in the arena include Disney on Ice, South African Music Awards and the MTV Africa Music Awards.
- Durban Exhibition Centre: A series of exhibition halls originally built/opened in the 1980s. In 2000, the DEC became a part of the complex.
  - Coast of Dreams and Mystrals: Banquet halls.
  - East Park: Outdoor space used for cocktail parties and open-air events. Includes at waterproof Bedouin Tent that is erected for weather issues.
- Hilton Durban Hotel: A 324-room hotel that opened August 1997.

== Awards ==
The Durban ICC has received a number of awards, some of which are listed here:

- Africa's Leading Meetings and Conference Centre: 2001–2006, 2008–2014 (World Travel Awards)
- World's Top 15 Congress Centres: 2014 (International Association of Congress Centres - AIPC)
- World's Top 15 Congress Centres: 2016 (International Association of Congress Centres - AIPC)

== See also ==
- List of convention and exhibition centres
- List of indoor arenas in South Africa
