= Hany El-Fakharany =

Egyptian handball player

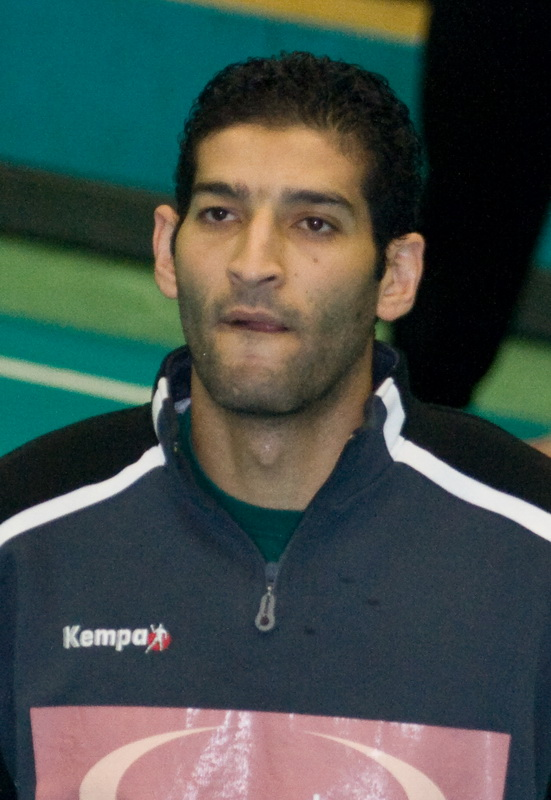
- Hany El-Fakharany in 2007

Personal information
- Nationality: Egyptian
- Born: 6 April 1978 (age 48)
- Height: 197 cm (78 in)

Sport
- Sport: Handball
- Position: Pivot

Senior clubs
- Years: Team
- 2001-2007: al Ahly Cairo
- 2007-2009: Füchse Berlin
National team
Years	Team	Apps
–	Egypt	173

Hany El-Fakharany (born 6 April 1978) is an Egyptian handball player. He competed in the men's tournament at the 2000 Summer Olympics, 2004 Summer Olympics, and the 2008 Summer Olympics.

He played for Al Ahly in Egypt and Füchse Berlin in Germany.
