= Pavilhão Acácias Rubras =

- Location: Benguela, Angola
- Owner: State-owned
- Capacity: 2100
- Surface: Hardwood
- Scoreboard: Electronic

Construction
- Opened: August 17, 2007

The Pavilhão Acácias Rubras is an Angolan indoor sporting arena located in Benguela. The arena, built on the occasion of the 2007 Afrobasket along with the Pavilhão Nossa Senhora do Monte in Lubango, Pavilhão Serra Van-Dúnem in Huambo and the Pavilhão do Tafe in Cabinda, has a 2,100-seat capacity.

== See also ==
- Pavilhão N. Sra do Monte
- Pavilhão Serra Van-Dúnem
- Pavilhão do Tafe
