= Pavilhão Serra Van-Dúnem =

Arena in Huambo, Angola

- Interactive map of Pavilhão Serra Van-Dúnem
- Location: Huambo, Angola
- Coordinates: 12.77606°S 15.73991°E
- Owner: State-owned
- Capacity: 2010
- Surface: Hardwood
- Scoreboard: Electronic

Construction
- Opened: August 17, 2007

The Pavilhão Serra Van-Dunem is an Angolan indoor sporting arena located in Huambo. The arena was built for the 2007 Afrobasket continental tournament and was ready in time to host games during the tournament. It has a 2,010-seat capacity.

It has also been used to host concerts, cultural events, and Christian Masses.

== See also ==
- Pavilhão Acácias Rubras
- Pavilhão N.Sra do Monte
- Pavilhão do Tafe
