= José Nascimento (basketball) =

Angolan basketball player (born 1978)

Personal information
- Born: December 25, 1978 (age 47) Luanda, Angola
- Listed height: 196 cm (6.43 ft)
- Position: Power forward

Career history
- 2000–: ASA
- 2001–: Primeiro de Agosto
- –: Interclube
- 2008–2010: ASA
- 2011–: Interclube

José do Nascimento dos Santos (born December 25, 1978, in Luanda), is an Angolan basketball player. Nascimento, a 196 cm (6 ft 5 in) power forward, has competed for Angola at the 2001 FIBA Africa Championship.
