= Pavilhão Nossa Senhora do Monte =

Pavilhão da N. Sra do Monte
- Location: Lubango, Huíla
- Owner: State-owned
- Capacity: 2000
- Surface: Hardwood
- Scoreboard: Electronic

Construction
- Opened: August 17, 2007

The Pavilhão Nossa Senhora do Monte or N. Sra do Monte (in English: Our Lady of the Hill) is an Angolan indoor sporting arena located in Lubango, Huíla. The arena, built on the occasion of the 2007 Afrobasket, along with the Pavilhão Acácias Rubras in Benguela, Pavilhão Serra Van-Dúnem in Huambo and the Pavilhão do Tafe in Cabinda, has a 2,000-seat capacity.

== See also ==
- Pavilhão Acácias Rubras
- Pavilhão Serra Van-Dúnem
- Pavilhão do Tafe
