= Pavilhão do Tafe =

- Interactive map of Pavilhão do Tafe
- Location: Cabinda, Angola
- Coordinates: 5.565030°S 12.190770°E
- Owner: State-owned
- Capacity: 2,000
- Surface: Hardwood
- Scoreboard: Electronic

Construction
- Opened: August 17, 2007
- Architect: SOAPRO

Pavilhão do Tafe is an indoor sporting arena located in Cabinda, Angola. The arena, built on the occasion of the 2007 Afrobasket, alongside the Pavilhão Acácias Rubras in Benguela, Pavilhão N.Sra do Monte in Huíla and the Pavilhão Serra Van-Dúnem in Huambo, has a 2,000-seat capacity.

== See also ==
- Pavilhão Acácias Rubras
- Pavilhão N.Sra do Monte
- Pavilhão Serra Van-Dúnem
