= Individual sport =

Sport in which a participant works alone

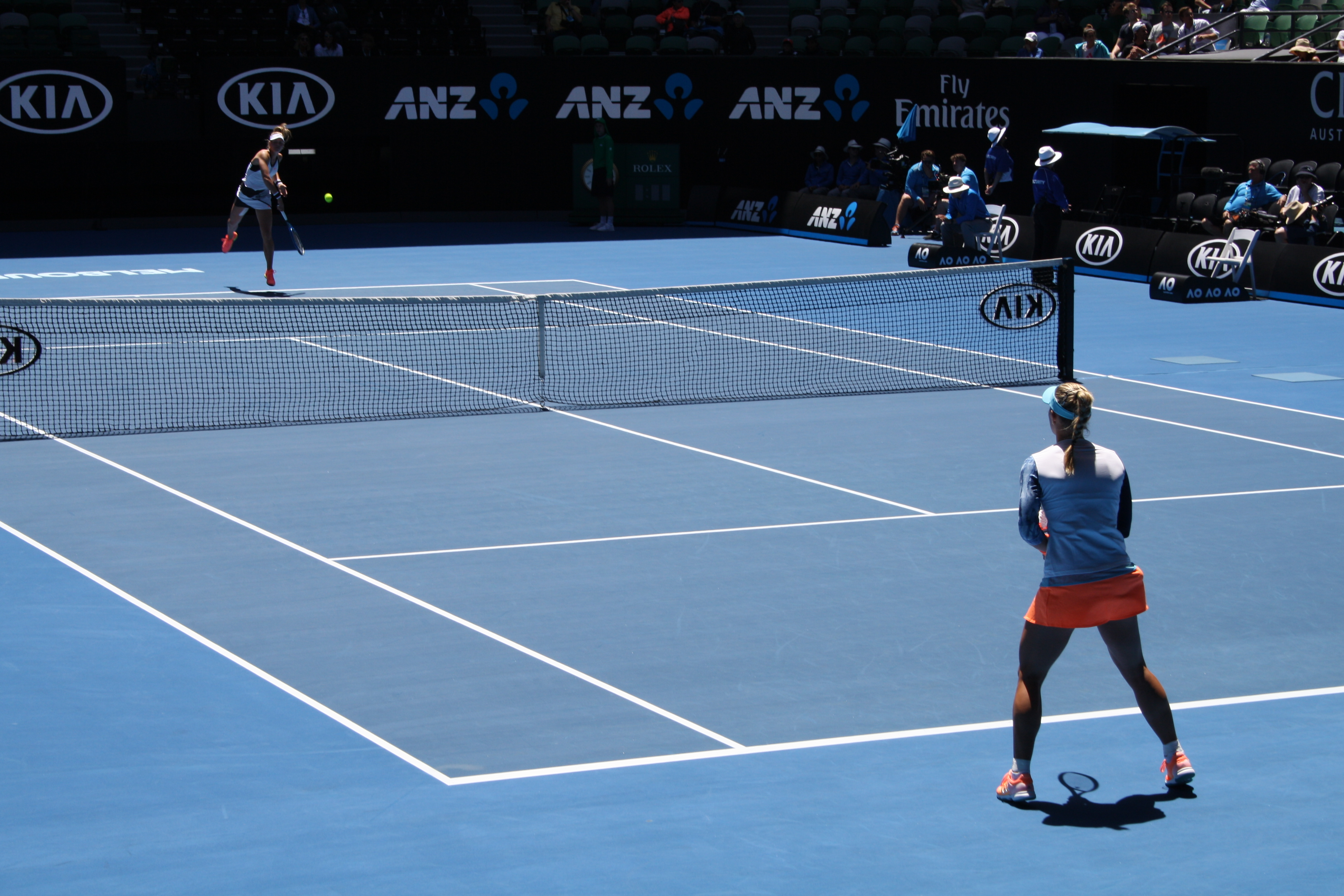
A tennis match

An individual sport or one on one sport is a sport in which participants compete as individuals, although team competitions within individual sports also occur, such as the Davis Cup and the Billie Jean King Cup.

== Examples ==
- Athletics
  - Running
  - Track and field
- Cue sports
  - Carom billiards
  - Pool
  - Snooker
- BMX
- Bodybuilding
- Bowling
  - Tenpin bowling
- Bowls
- Bull riding
- Calisthenics
- Canoeing
- Caving
- Chess
- Combat sports
  - Armored combat
  - Boxing
  - Fencing
  - Judo
  - Martial arts
  - Mixed martial arts
  - Sapakan
  - Taekwondo
  - Tai chi
  - Wrestling
- Croquet
- Crossfit
- Cycling
- Dance
- Darts
- Disc golf
- Equestrian
- Figure skating
- Golf
- Gymnastics
- Hang gliding
- Motocross
- Motorsport
- Multisport
  - Biathlon
  - Triathlon
- Orienteering
- Racquet sports
  - Badminton
  - Padel
  - Pickleball
  - Racquetball
  - Squash
  - Table tennis
  - Tennis
- Rock climbing
- Rodeo
- Rowing
- Sailing
- Shooting
- Skateboarding
- Skiing
- Skipping rope
- Snowboarding
- Speed skating
- Sport stacking
- Surfing
  - Skimboarding
- Swimming
  - Diving
- Table football
- Weightlifting
  - Olympic weightlifting
  - Powerlifting

== See also ==
- Team sport
