= Huambo =

Huambo Nova Lisboa (New Lisbon)
- Municipality
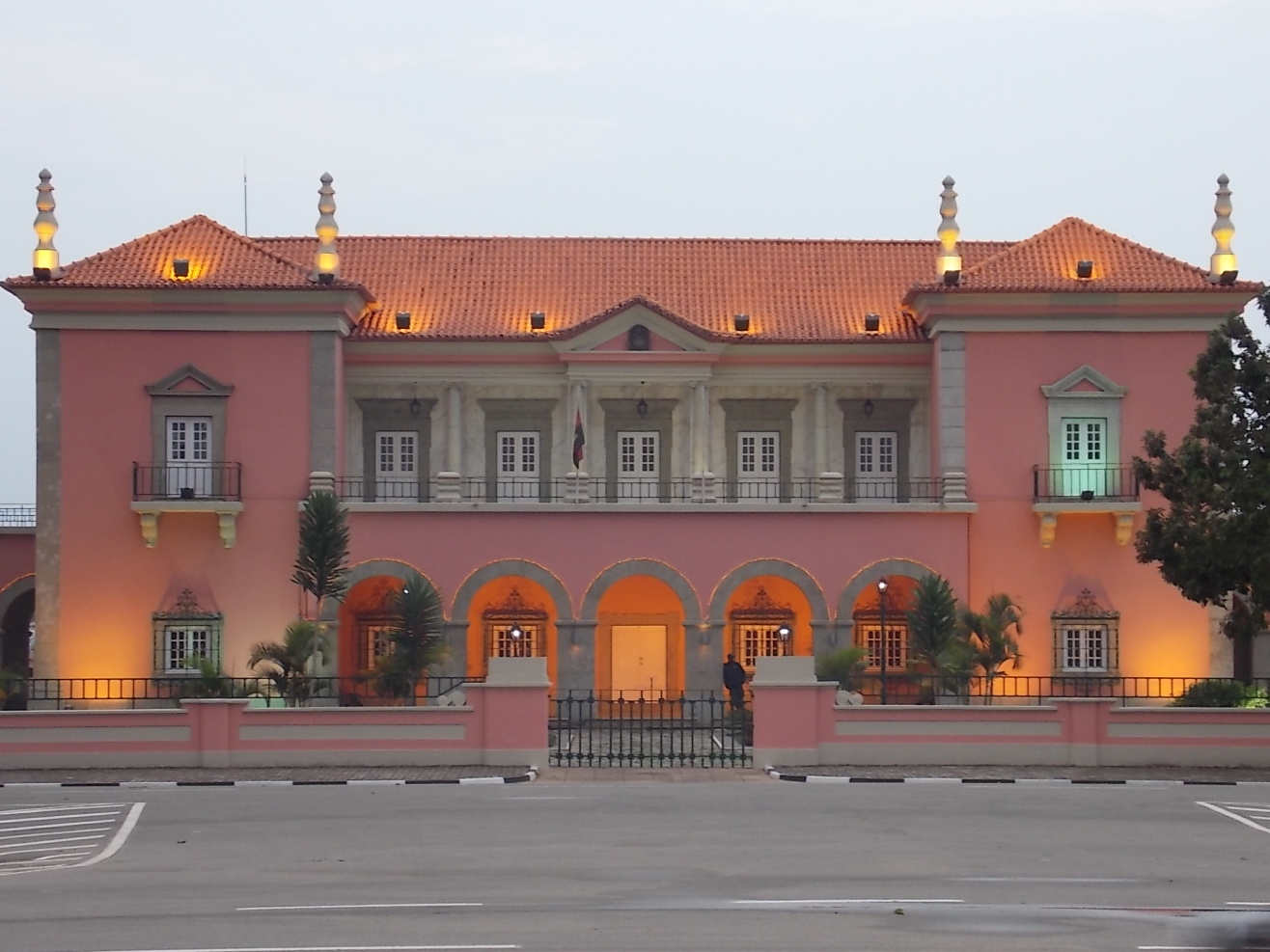
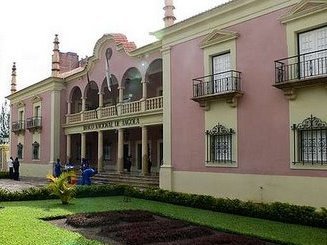
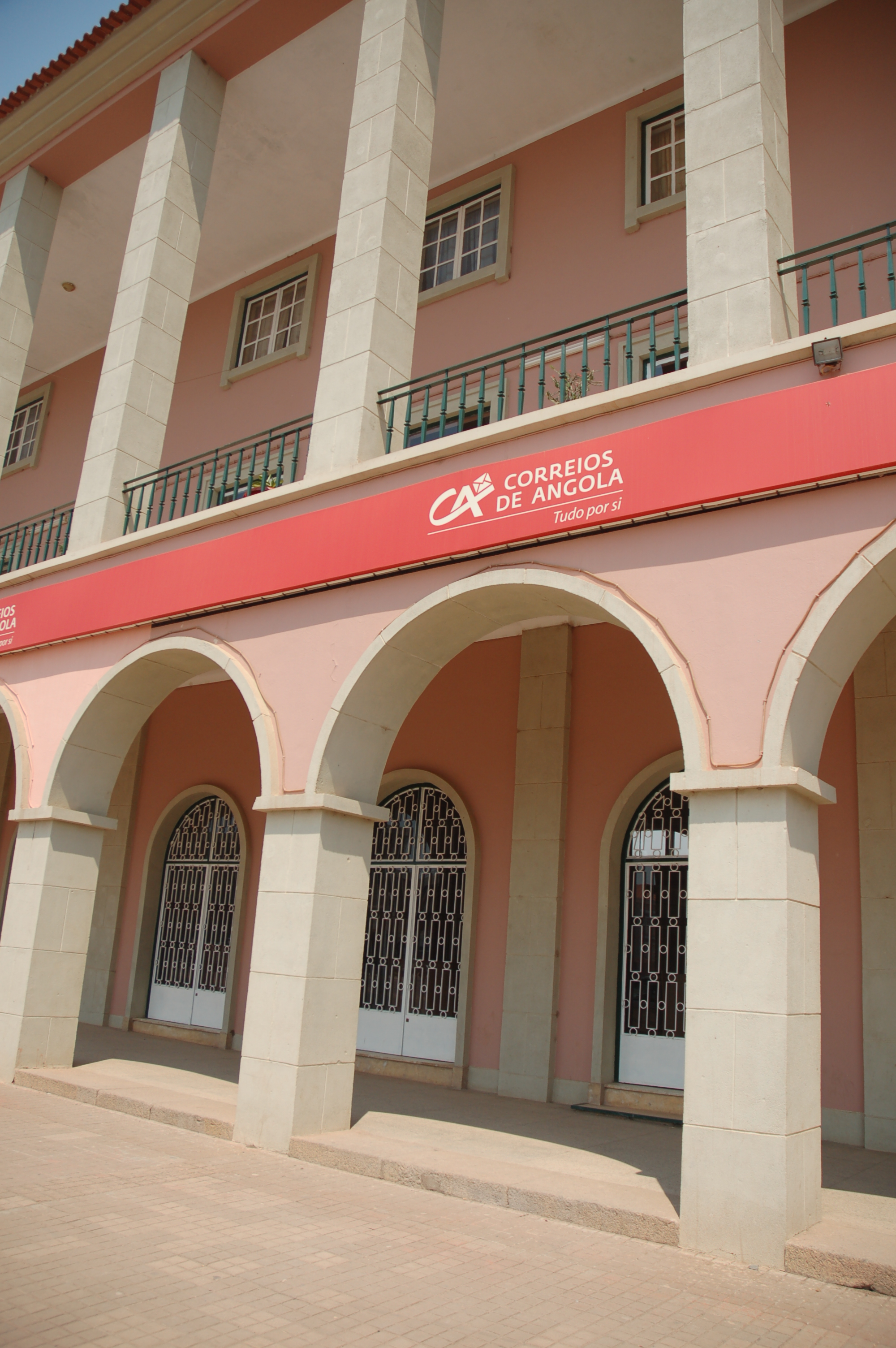
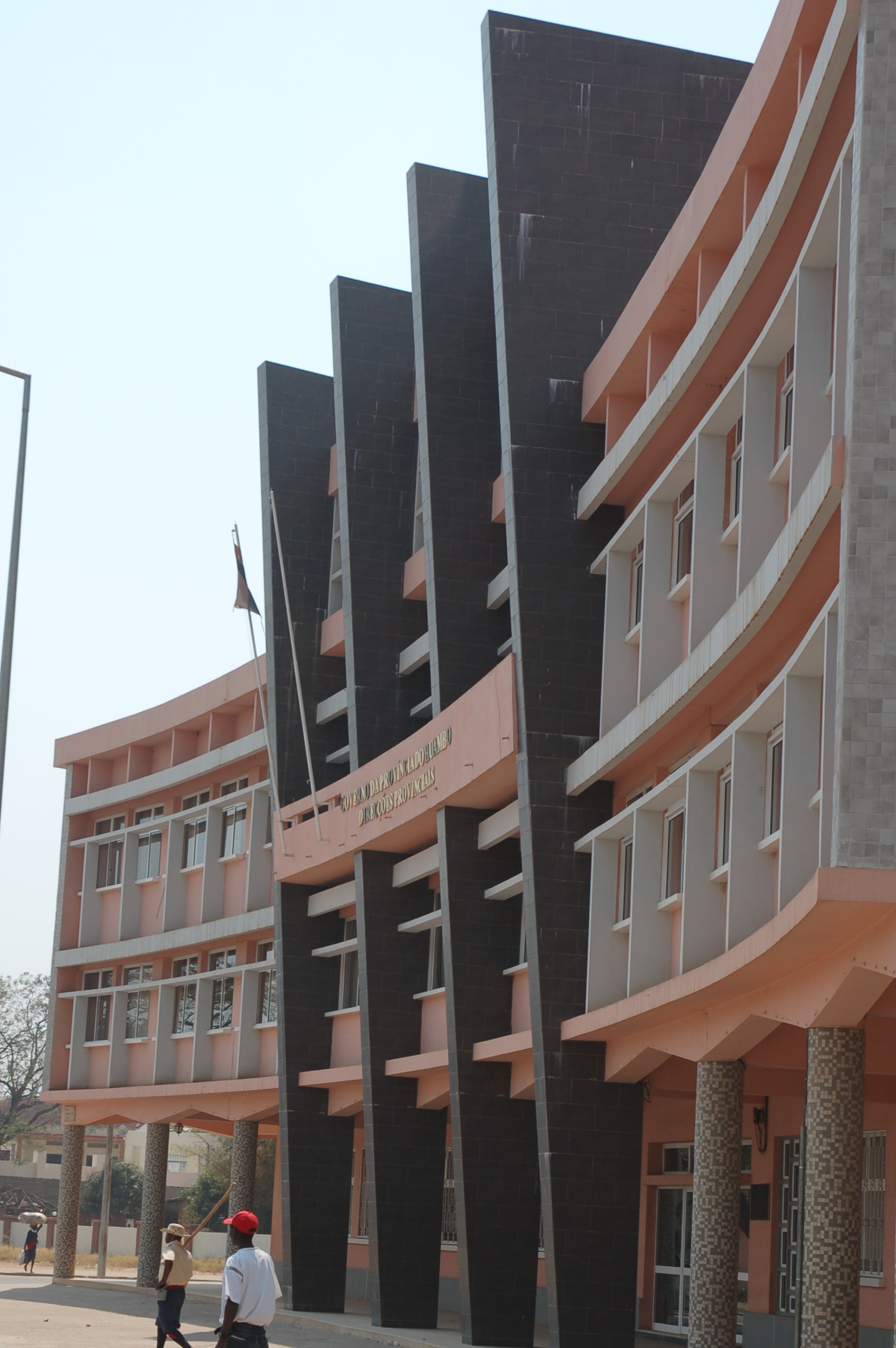
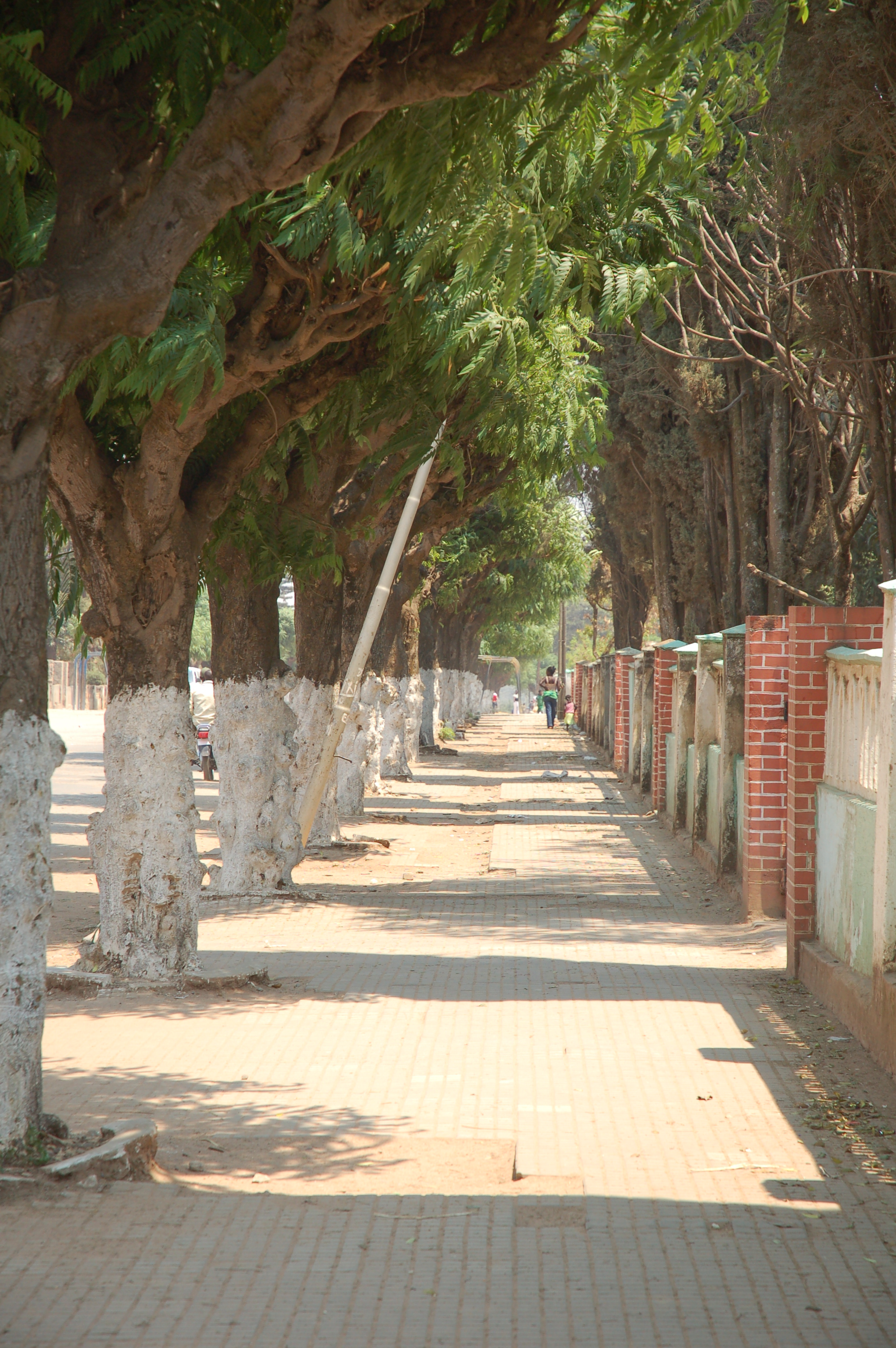
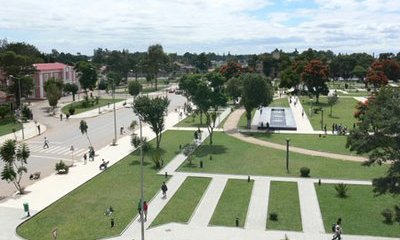

- Location in Angola Huambo (Africa)
- Coordinates: 12°46′36″S 15°44′05″E
- Country: Angola
- Province: Huambo
- Founded: August 8, 1912; 114 years ago

Area
  - Municipality: 2,711 km^{2} (1,047 sq mi)
- Elevation: 1,721 m (5,646 ft)

Population (2024 Census)
  - Municipality: 836,293
  - Density: 308.5/km^{2} (799.0/sq mi)
  - Metro: 1,896,147
- Time zone: UTC+1 (WAT)
- Climate: Cwb

Huambo, formerly Nova Lisboa (English: New Lisbon), is the third-most populous city in Angola, after the capital city Luanda and Lubango, with a population of 710,000 (2024) in the city and a population of 836,293 in the municipality of Huambo (Census 2024). The city is the capital of the province of Huambo and is located about 220 km E from Benguela and 600 km SE from Luanda. Huambo is a main hub on the Caminho de Ferro de Benguela (CFB) (the Benguela Railway), which runs from the port of Lobito to the Democratic Republic of the Congo's southernmost province, Katanga. Huambo is served by the Albano Machado Airport (formerly Nova Lisboa Airport).

== History ==
=== Early history ===
Huambo receives its name from Wambu, one of the 14 old Ovimbundu kingdoms of the central Angolan plateau. The Ovimbundu, an ethnic group that originally arrived from Eastern Africa, had founded their central kingdom of Bailundu as early as the 15th century. Wambu was one of the smaller kingdoms and was hierarchically under the king of Bailundu, though it enjoyed a considerable degree of independence.

Whereas Bailundo is mentioned in some 18th and 19th-century chronicles in connection to a trading route linking it with Viye (Bie), Wambu was only really known with the advent of the construction of the Benguela Railway by the Portuguese. Though the kings of Bailundu and Wambu (particularly Ekuikui II and Katiavala I) opposed the penetration of the railway by ambushing workers and settlers, they were eventually subdued by the Portuguese Army and Huambo was officially founded on 8 August 1912 by the Governor-General of Angola Norton de Matos.

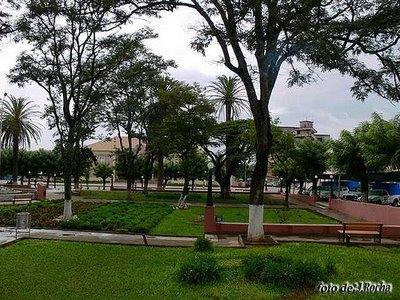
Huambo central garden.

The origin of Huambo and the economic importance it reached under Portuguese administration is very closely linked to the construction of the Caminho de Ferro de Benguela (Benguela Railway), which had started in the coastal town of Lobito in 1902. This railroad had been devised by the British entrepreneur Sir Robert Williams as the easiest and cheapest way to link the rich copper mines of Katanga, in Belgian Congo, with a point on the coast from which the mineral could be exported. The Lobito bay was admittedly the best natural seaport in the whole continent.

The construction of the railway initially advanced with great difficulty, due to the ruggedness of the terrain, the prevalence of malaria and, to some extent, the resistance of the natives. Huambo was found to be a strategic place for many reasons. A benign climate (greatly due to its high altitude, 1,700m) and the presence of abundant water resources in and around made of it an ideal spot to have a hub on the railway. Once this was achieved, the works progressed comparatively faster and the link with the Belgian Congo border was completed in 1929. By then Huambo had become the site of the most important railway workshop in Africa.

By the 1920s Huambo already was one of the main economic engines of Portuguese Angola. It had some important food processing plants, served as the main exporting point for the Province's considerable agricultural wealth and was also known by its numerous educational facilities, especially the Agricultural Research Institute (currently part of the College of Agricultural Science).

In 1928 Huambo was renamed Nova Lisboa (New Lisbon, after Lisbon the capital of Portugal).

In 1966, the graduations in Veterinary Medicine, Agronomy and Forestry of the General University Studies of Angola (University of Angola, from 1968) are installed in Nova Lisboa.

In motorsports, by the late 1960s, the city of Nova Lisboa had become internationally renowned for its International Nova Lisboa 6 Hours sports car race. Until the independence of Angola in 1975, the city of Nova Lisboa expanded and its economic growth and development boomed, making it one of the most important urban centres in the then Portuguese Overseas Province of Angola.

=== Post-independence ===
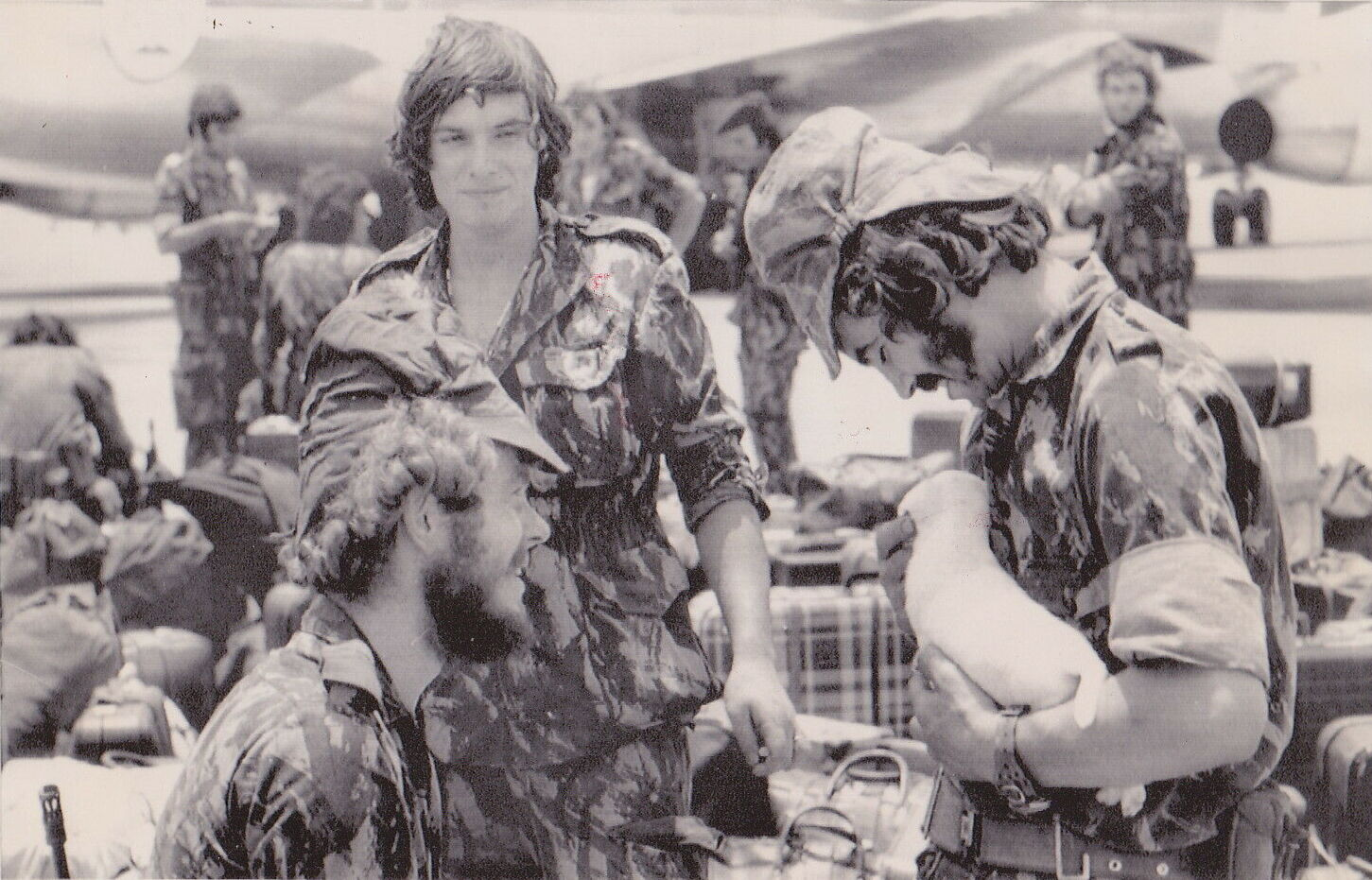
Portuguese soldiers being withdrawn from the Nova Lisboa garrison in 1975 after the Carnation Revolution in Lisbon.

After independence from Portugal in 1975, Nova Lisboa was given back its original name – Huambo. The Angolan Civil War from 1975 until 2002 halted Angola's and Huambo's development, destroying a great part of its infrastructure.

Huambo became the site of the brutal 55 Day War and other battles during the bloody civil war between the MPLA and UNITA, that lasted from independence in 1975 until the death of rebel UNITA leader Jonas Savimbi in 2002. The city was besieged, extensively damaged, and its civilians were massacred en-masse or fled the city.

Upon independence in 1975, Savimbi declared Huambo to be the capital of the Democratic People's Republic of Angola, as UNITA's rival to the MPLA's People's Republic of Angola. However, the MPLA took the city back on 8 February 1976 with the help of Cuban troops, though most of the surrounding areas remained under UNITA control.

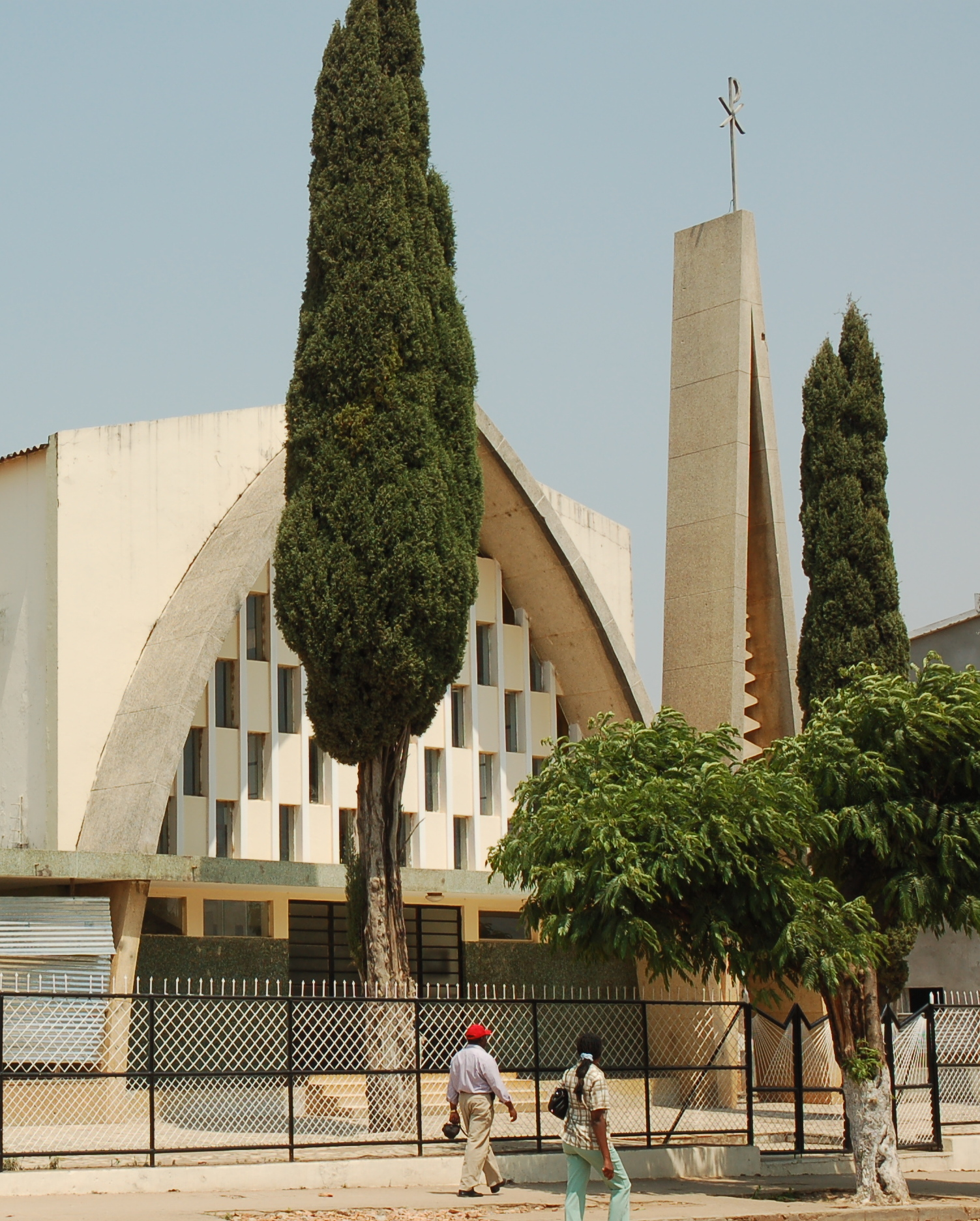
Church in Huambo.

By mid-1976 the Cuban expeditionary force had established its most important structures in the Province of Huambo in the areas of São Pedro, Lufefena, and Cruzeiro, and strong garrisons in most of the other municipal capitals and main towns, but UNITA had the control of nearly all of the territory in between.

Displaced people started concentrating in towns, seeking physical protection and humanitarian assistance. In this context, one of the first humanitarian agencies to arrive in the Province of Huambo was the International Committee of the Red Cross (ICRC) in 1979.

In 1984 the conflict escalated dramatically, and so did displacement into towns. A major relief operation was launched in the capitals of the Central Plateau and in a good number of the municipalities still accessible by plane. By then the largest part of the roads were controlled by UNITA and heavily mined.

In May 1991 a peace agreement was reached between the MPLA and UNITA. United Nations agencies and NGOs progressively moved in between mid-1991 and 1992. The situation gradually improved and general elections were called for in September 1992. But trouble set off as soon as the results of the polls were disseminated. Unrest arrived to Huambo very rapidly, as UNITA considered the Province in a way as their political shrine. They concentrated in the town most of their leaders and a large section of their troops soon after the defeat in the elections was made public.

The city would still be formally under the control of the MPLA government, but tension progressively built-up due to increasing violent actions. By the end of 1992 all foreign aid agencies had withdrawn from Huambo. UNITA took full control of the town in the course of horrendous street-to-street battles that started just after Christmas 1992 and reached its climax by mid-January in 1993. Violent combats in and around Huambo lasted for 55 days, until the MPLA Government troops withdrew and UNITA gained full control of the city. Most other cities in the Central Plateau were also occupied by UNITA at the time.

Map of Huambo.

The armed conflict flared up again in August 1994. A large offensive gave back to the Government the control of Huambo on 9 November, and soon after all other provincial capitals. The UNITA headquarters was then moved to Jamba in the province of Kuando Kubango.

The war ended formally on 20 November 1994 with the signature of the Lusaka Protocol. To a great extent this step meant a move towards normalcy, and was received in Huambo with moderate optimism. UNITA moved again its headquarters soon after signing the protocol, this time to Bailundo, some 50 km north of the provincial capital. This relocation raised serious concerns among most observers.

By 1995 free transit of people and goods was quite reestablished in the Province. By the end of the year the United Nations peacekeepers (UNAVEM III) had been deployed in Huambo, following the provisions of the Lusaka Protocol. 1996 and 1997 were years of relative improvement of the living conditions of civilians in Huambo, although return movements were only moderate, reconstruction slow and commercial activities did not regain their past vigor.

After the United Nations Security Council enforced sanctions against UNITA (29 October 1997), because of delays in the implementation of the Lusaka Protocol and reluctance to demilitarize and turn over its strongholds, insecurity in Huambo increased gradually, especially in the second half of 1998. In early December the Government launched an offensive aimed at taking the last strongholds held by UNITA in Huambo and Kuito, this new war outbreak soon extending to other regions of the country.

Huge population displacements started once again from the rural areas to Huambo, Kuito and Caala. Large camps of internally displaced people were then installed in these cities as the Humanitarian Community was forced to retire out of UNITA-controlled areas, withdrawing completely by the end of the year and concentrating in Huambo, Caala, and later, Ukuma.

The security situation got extremely volatile. As Huambo and other major towns in the Plateau were being shelled from Bailundo and other positions still in possession of UNITA, two C-130 Hercules aircraft chartered by the United Nations with 23 people on board were shot down over Vila Nova (on 26 December 1998 and 2 January 1999), while they were trying to evacuate to Luanda the last remains of the UNAVEM III mission in Huambo.

The Government retook the town of Bailundo in October 1999. Londuimbali, Vila Nova and some other large towns in the Province were already under the rule of the Government, and in December 1999 the administration of the state had been reestablished in all municipal capitals. In this period the conventional war that the Province had known gave way to guerrilla warfare, UNITA still controlling most rural areas and randomly striking military or police installations of the Government, and often civilian communities too.

The exodus of civilians into Huambo and Caála experienced a new boom.

=== 21st century ===
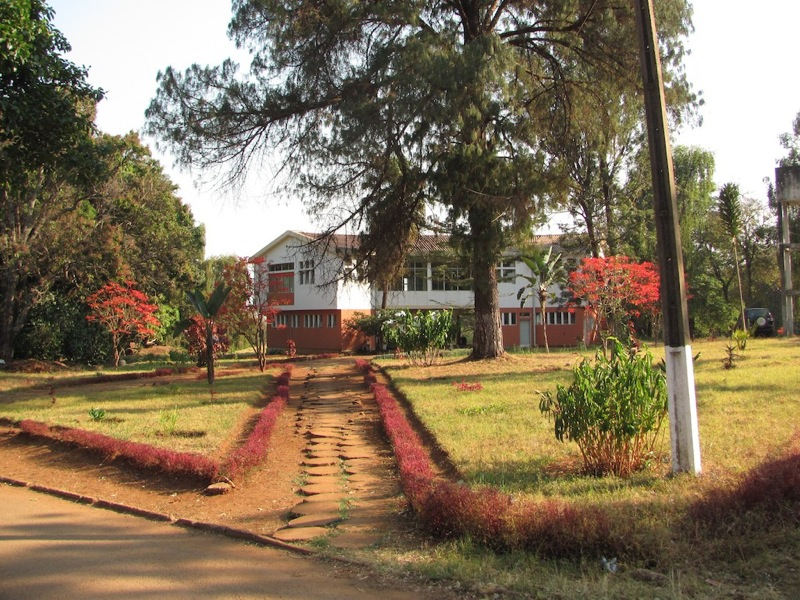
Agronomy Institute of Angola.

In early 2000 there were over 25,000 displaced people in the village of Caala, and over 40,000 in Huambo town. As international sanctions tightened around UNITA, their military actions in Huambo got more frequent and destructive, reaching a peak of violence by the end of 2000.

In October 2001 the Government launched a renewed offensive against UNITA from the North and the South of the Province, combining this time strict military action with what were known as operações de limpeza, literally, cleansing operations which consisted in removing from rural areas large groups of population which were subsequently forced into a few, specific concentration points. The idea behind this strategy was depriving the guerrilla of the potential support it may still find in the villages they formerly controlled in the bush, making their natural habitat unlivable.

In the short term this resulted in renewed pressure over available resources in safe areas of the city and Province of Huambo, and in many cases in the death by starvation of groups trapped by the conflict or impeded to reach any of those zones. This point probably represents the climax in the hardship the rural civilian population went through in the Province of Huambo for the duration of the war.

The death of Jonas Savimbi in February 2002 and the subsequent signature of a new cease-fire brought back tranquility to the Province, set the conditions for the present ongoing peace process, and the beginning of an era of development.

The advent of peace brought a new era of reconstruction and regeneration in Huambo, and across Angola.

== Geography ==
Situated in the Angolan central highlands, Huambo is located near the headwaters of the Cunene River. The elevation of Huambo is 1,721 metres (5,646 ft) as it is on a high plateau.

=== Climate ===
Huambo features a subtropical highland climate (Köppen: Cwb), with wet summers from October through April and dry winters between May and September. Despite its location in the tropics, due to its high altitude, Huambo features mild, spring-like temperatures throughout the course of the year, a characteristic common among cities with this climate. September is the warmest month with a mean of 21.0 °C (69.8 °F), and June is the coolest month with a mean of 16.2 °C (61.2 °F) The city sees plentiful precipitation during the course of the year, averaging nearly 1,400 millimetres (55 in) of rain, although because of the dry season May to September receives significantly less precipitation, with June and July receiving no rain at all. Due to the higher altitude, temperatures in Huambo are only slightly higher than in the city of Pretoria located almost 2000 km further south-east. There is more sunshine in the winter (particularly June and July) than the summer, and Huambo receives 2273 hours of sunshine in total.

Climate data for Huambo (1941–1970)
Month	Jan	Feb	Mar	Apr	May	Jun	Jul	Aug	Sep	Oct	Nov	Dec	Year
Record high °C (°F)	31.2 (88.2)	31.1 (88.0)	29.8 (85.6)	29.5 (85.1)	29.0 (84.2)	28.4 (83.1)	28.5 (83.3)	30.9 (87.6)	32.0 (89.6)	32.0 (89.6)	30.7 (87.3)	30.4 (86.7)	32.0 (89.6)
Mean daily maximum °C (°F)	24.9 (76.8)	25.2 (77.4)	25.0 (77.0)	25.5 (77.9)	25.4 (77.7)	24.6 (76.3)	25.0 (77.0)	27.2 (81.0)	28.7 (83.7)	27.3 (81.1)	25.2 (77.4)	24.9 (76.8)	25.7 (78.3)
Daily mean °C (°F)	19.8 (67.6)	19.8 (67.6)	19.8 (67.6)	19.6 (67.3)	18.0 (64.4)	16.2 (61.2)	16.6 (61.9)	18.8 (65.8)	21.0 (69.8)	20.8 (69.4)	19.8 (67.6)	19.8 (67.6)	19.2 (66.6)
Mean daily minimum °C (°F)	14.4 (57.9)	14.2 (57.6)	14.4 (57.9)	13.7 (56.7)	10.5 (50.9)	7.8 (46.0)	7.9 (46.2)	10.3 (50.5)	13.0 (55.4)	14.2 (57.6)	14.3 (57.7)	14.3 (57.7)	12.4 (54.3)
Record low °C (°F)	8.9 (48.0)	8.4 (47.1)	9.3 (48.7)	7.4 (45.3)	4.6 (40.3)	2.1 (35.8)	2.0 (35.6)	4.7 (40.5)	7.7 (45.9)	9.4 (48.9)	7.5 (45.5)	9.2 (48.6)	2.0 (35.6)
Average precipitation mm (inches)	220 (8.7)	179 (7.0)	239 (9.4)	146 (5.7)	14 (0.6)	0 (0)	0 (0)	1 (0.0)	19 (0.7)	119 (4.7)	227 (8.9)	234 (9.2)	1,398 (55.0)
Average precipitation days (≥ 0.1 mm)	20	17	22	14	3	0	0	0	4	16	21	21	138
Average relative humidity (%)	72	67	73	66	48	38	33	29	38	57	69	71	55
Mean monthly sunshine hours	142.6	141.3	142.6	171.0	241.8	270.0	269.7	254.2	201.0	164.3	135.0	139.5	2,273
Mean daily sunshine hours	4.6	5.0	4.6	5.7	7.8	9.0	8.7	8.2	6.7	5.3	4.5	4.5	6.2
Source: Deutscher Wetterdienst

== Education and science ==
Huambo is home to two public higher education institutions, namely the José Eduardo dos Santos University and the Higher Institute of Education Sciences of Huambo. There are also the headquarters of the Veterinary Research Institute and the Agricultural Research Institute, dedicated solely to research and extension.

== Notable residents ==
- Lúcio Lara (1929–2016) Angolan politician
- Gabriela Antunes (1937–2004) Angolan writer
