= 1999 FIBA Africa Championship squads =

Main article: FIBA Africa Championship 1999

South Africa

Player	MJ	Min	Mo	Tirs	%	3pts	LF	Ro	Rd	Tot	Moy	Co	Pd	In	Bp	Pts	Moy
Craig Gilchrist	6	220	36	28-66	42.4	3-10	20-37	22	40	62	10.3	4	12	7	38	79	13.2
Thabo Letsebe	6	209	34	22-78	28.2	6-26	2-5	10	25	35	5.8	3	7	14	27	52	8.7
David Uniacke	6	184	30	17-41	41.5	4-15	8-14	9	31	40	6.7	7	8	5	20	46	7.7
Emmanuel Madondo	6	221	36	9-28	32.1	6-17	10-18	3	13	16	2.7	0	25	11	31	34	5.7
Chris Trauernicht	3	60	20	6-15	40.0	0-0	4-6	5	14	19	6.3	3	2	1	5	16	5.3
Solly Mashiane	6	101	16	11-35	31.4	2-17	2-4	3	11	14	2.3	0	4	2	13	26	4.3
Nyakallo Nthuping	3	20	6	2-10	20.0	0-4	4-4	2	3	5	1.7	0	1	1	3	8	2.7
Joseph Mazibuko	6	63	10	7-23	30.4	0-3	1-4	6	7	13	2.2	0	2	2	8	15	2.5
Sibusiso Mabaso	3	25	8	2-5	40.0	0-0	0-0	4	4	8	2.7	1	0	1	4	4	1.3
Djunga Letwaba	4	35	8	2-6	33.3	0-0	0-2	0	4	4	1.0	0	0	1	1	4	1.0
Kaiser Tsosane	5	62	12	1-11	9.09	0-5	1-2	0	9	9	1.8	0	4	3	8	3	0.6
SOUTH AFRICA	6	1200	200	107-318	33.6	21-97	52-96	64	161	225	37.5	18	65	48	158	287	47.8

Algeria

Joueur	MJ	Min	Mo	Tirs	%	3pts	LF	Ro	Rd	Tot	Moy	Co	Pd	In	Bp	Pts	Moy
Amine Ben Ramdhane	5	120	24	19-47	40.4	10-28	7-9	3	4	7	1.4	1	7	4	9	55	11.0
Nadjim Ouali	5	142	28	20-44	45.5	0-0	8-13	10	30	40	8.0	3	1	4	12	48	9.6
Abdelhalim Sayah	5	107	21	13-29	44.8	1-3	14-26	4	11	15	3.0	3	0	1	7	41	8.2
Abdelaziz Rebahi	1	20	20	3-6	50.0	2-4	0-0	0	1	1	1.0	0	0	3	0	8	8.0
Fardj Harouni	5	182	36	11-33	33.3	3-13	13-23	3	19	22	4.4	0	15	12	20	38	7.6
Mourad Boukhalfi	5	142	28	14-41	34.1	0-5	8-21	8	21	29	5.8	4	1	7	9	36	7.2
Ali Ben Houcine	4	81	20	10-30	33.3	1-12	4-10	2	8	10	2.5	0	4	6	13	25	6.3
Kamel Ait Kali	5	71	14	11-36	30.6	1-7	8-15	5	4	9	1.8	0	1	2	5	31	6.2
Samir Amane	3	38	12	6-18	33.3	0-0	3-4	2	4	6	2.0	0	1	1	3	15	5.0
Tarek Oukid	5	68	13	11-18	61.1	0-0	1-2	5	7	12	2.4	0	0	1	4	23	4.6
Ismail Kessi	4	29	7	1-2	50.0	0-0	3-6	1	7	8	2.0	0	0	2	1	5	1.3
ALGERIA	5	1000	200	119-304	39.1	18-72	69-129	43	116	159	31.8	11	30	43	83	325	65.0

Angola

Player	MJ	Min	Mo	Tirs	%	3pts	LF	Ro	Rd	Tot	Moy	Co	Pd	In	Bp	Pts	Moy
Victor Carvalho	7	190	27	33-65	50.8	25-52	5-6	8	12	20	2.9	2	13	4	11	96	13.7
Edmar Victoriano	7	176	25	33-55	60.0	8-22	14-25	11	23	34	4.9	2	13	13	18	88	12.6
David Dias	7	155	22	32-53	60.4	5-14	6-11	12	21	33	4.7	7	10	9	11	75	10.7
J.-Jacques Conceicao	7	190	27	23-48	47.9	1-10	22-32	15	38	53	7.6	2	17	4	18	69	9.9
Herlander Coimbra	4	71	17	13-28	46.4	7-21	4-5	2	11	13	3.3	4	1	3	5	37	9.3
Miguel Lutonda	7	147	21	16-37	43.2	9-19	17-20	2	11	13	1.9	0	26	5	15	58	8.3
Carlos Almeida	7	96	13	14-34	41.2	4-17	14-19	3	12	15	2.1	0	15	8	10	46	6.6
Angelo Victoriano	7	102	14	15-33	45.5	2-13	7-11	14	16	30	4.3	4	6	4	0	39	5.6
Cristovao Suingui	7	87	12	13-26	50.0	0-2	7-13	5	8	13	1.9	0	14	10	15	33	4.7
Anibal Moreira	5	71	14	5-15	33.3	2-10	6-8	2	10	12	2.4	0	7	5	8	18	3.6
Joaquim Gomes	7	86	12	8-19	42.1	0-0	7-16	8	12	20	2.9	14	5	4	11	23	3.3
Justino Victoriano	4	29	7	2-5	40.0	0-0	0-0	5	4	9	2.3	1	3	0	2	4	1.0
ANGOLA	7	1400	200	207-418	49.5	63-180	109-166	87	178	265	37.9	36	130	69	124	586	83.7

Cape Verde

Player	MJ	Min	Mo	Tirs	%	3pts	LF	Ro	Rd	Tot	Moy	Co	Pd	In	Bp	Pts	Moy
Victor Hugo Fortes	6	181	30	28-60	46.7	8-22	23-33	12	25	37	6.2	2	3	8	20	87	14.5
Joao Paulo Monteiro	6	182	30	23-66	34.8	7-16	4-9	11	30	41	6.8	3	7	14	12	57	9.5
Mario Correia	6	112	18	17-45	37.8	8-27	6-11	4	6	10	1.7	0	1	5	8	48	8.0
Alfredo Ferreira	6	160	26	13-43	30.2	5-16	13-20	9	6	15	2.5	0	8	10	15	44	7.3
Paulo Cabral	6	85	14	19-37	51.4	0-1	2-4	7	6	13	2.2	2	2	4	0	40	6.7
Alfredo Barbosa	6	85	14	11-40	27.5	10-39	5-8	3	8	11	1.8	0	5	6	6	37	6.2
Antonio Moreira	6	82	13	9-34	26.5	0-10	5-14	0	1	1	0.2	0	0	1	8	23	3.8
Eric Silva	6	177	29	7-18	38.9	1-7	5-15	2	11	13	2.2	0	4	15	7	20	3.3
Aquiles Evora	4	55	13	4-10	40.0	0-1	2-10	2	9	11	2.8	0	0	0	6	10	2.5
Eneias Antunes	6	49	8	4-11	36.4	0-1	4-5	0	6	6	1.0	0	3	2	6	12	2.0
Antonio Tavares	6	32	5	0-5	0.0	0-1	3-4	1	1	2	0.3	0	1	0	5	3	0.5
CAPE VERDE	6	1200	200	135-369	36.6	39-141	72-133	51	109	160	26.7	7	34	65	93	381	63.5

Côte d'Ivoire

Joueur	MJ	Min	Mo	Tirs	%	3pts	LF	Ro	Rd	Tot	Moy	Co	Pd	In	Bp	Pts	Moy
Michel Lasme	4	80	20	21-38	55.3	2-5	2-6	2	12	14	3.5	1	10	6	14	46	11.5
Amadou Moro	4	79	19	15-36	41.7	9-21	5-5	2	1	3	0.8	0	3	4	6	44	11.0
Josea Niamkey	4	124	31	16-33	48.5	0-0	8-17	15	15	30	7.5	0	3	6	6	40	10.0
Michel Amalabian	4	93	23	13-32	40.6	0-3	10-15	3	14	17	4.3	1	8	3	8	36	9.0
Idrissa Bangoura	4	139	34	9-25	36.0	0-1	11-16	7	13	20	5.0	7	5	2	10	29	7.3
Abou Bakayoko	4	50	12	7-17	41.2	3-11	4-5	1	6	7	1.8	3	2	2	4	21	5.3
Mamadou Ballo	4	42	10	5-12	41.7	2-4	6-9	1	6	7	1.8	0	1	3	6	18	4.5
Jean-Claude Kouame	4	51	12	6-14	42.9	0-1	5-6	4	2	6	1.5	1	2	5	5	17	4.3
Eric Ahoussi	4	37	9	5-11	45.5	0-0	0-2	2	2	4	1.0	2	0	1	1	10	2.5
Guy Touali	4	37	9	2-15	13.3	1-7	2-2	2	8	10	2.5	0	5	5	5	7	1.8
Maurice Amen	4	44	11	1-3	33.3	0-0	0-0	1	5	6	1.5	0	13	5	3	2	0.5
Amadou Dieng	4	24	6	0-4	0.0	0-4	0-0	1	3	4	1.0	0	3	0	3	0	0.0
COTE D IVOIRE	4	800	200	100-240	41.7	17-57	53-83	41	87	128	32.0	15	55	42	71	270	67.5

Egypt

Player	MJ	Min	Mo	Tirs	%	3pts	LF	Ro	Rd	Tot	Moy	Co	Pd	In	Bp	Pts	Moy
Tarek Taha El-Ghannam	7	135	19	35-71	49.3	2-10	12-24	20	39	59	8.4	12	4	11	12	84	12.0
Ismael Ahmed Ismail	6	199	33	24-62	38.7	6-25	14-22	16	33	49	8.2	4	16	7	28	68	11.3
Haytham El-Saaed Hassan	7	117	16	22-57	38.6	7-21	6-9	3	9	12	1.7	1	4	9	9	57	8.1
Ahmed Mohamed Sakr	7	117	16	17-30	56.7	1-2	9-13	5	18	23	3.3	0	3	1	14	44	6.3
Ahmed Abd El-Wahhad	6	113	18	14-33	42.4	2-9	7-11	1	8	9	1.5	0	7	8	13	37	6.2
Ahmed Ahmed Oraby	7	126	18	16-39	41.0	0-0	11-27	15	16	31	4.4	2	3	6	10	43	6.1
Mohamed Abd El-Motalib	4	80	20	8-24	33.3	6-15	1-1	4	9	13	3.3	0	1	3	5	23	5.8
Tarek Khairy Hussaien	7	155	22	14-36	38.9	6-15	6-12	5	6	11	1.6	1	16	7	18	40	5.7
El Hosany Samir Mohamed	6	83	13	9-29	31.0	1-6	7-13	8	15	23	3.8	0	2	6	6	26	4.3
Islam Ali Hassan	7	120	17	10-20	50.0	8-14	1-5	2	6	8	1.1	0	4	5	9	29	4.1
Waael Badr El-Sayed	7	79	11	4-11	36.4	1-4	7-10	2	10	12	1.7	0	2	6	5	16	2.3
Ihab Sabry Abd El-Aziz	7	76	10	4-21	19.0	0-8	2-8	4	10	14	2.0	0	4	3	6	10	1.4
EGYPT	7	1400	200	177-433	40.9	40-129	83-155	85	179	264	37.7	20	66	72	135	477	68.1

Mali

Player	MJ	Min	Mo	Tirs	%	3pts	LF	Ro	Rd	Tot	Moy	Co	Pd	In	Bp	Pts	Moy
Lamine Diawara	7	242	34	40-84	47.6	0-2	38-73	26	46	72	10.3	18	3	4	10	118	16.9
Sory Diakite	7	252	36	33-85	38.8	11-38	25-39	4	26	30	4.3	0	12	11	24	102	14.6
Kaba Kante	7	229	32	32-78	41.0	2-13	33-43	7	11	18	2.6	0	7	10	21	99	14.1
Hamidou Traore	7	102	14	12-34	35.3	5-18	8-9	3	13	16	2.3	0	2	8	6	37	5.3
Saliou Telly	7	127	18	10-24	41.7	1-4	11-16	12	9	21	3.0	1	3	10	11	32	4.6
Sory Sy	7	112	16	12-35	34.3	2-13	4-9	4	6	10	1.4	0	0	3	15	30	4.3
Boubakar Kanoute	7	115	16	9-36	25.0	4-11	8-14	1	7	8	1.1	0	4	9	4	30	4.3
Soumaila Samake	7	99	14	10-21	47.6	0-0	2-5	12	20	32	4.6	3	2	2	7	22	3.1
Abdoul Soumare	5	33	6	2-7	28.6	0-1	1-4	2	4	6	1.2	0	1	0	4	5	1.0
Namory Diarra	6	31	5	1-4	25.0	0-1	0-0	1	3	4	0.7	0	0	0	5	2	0.3
Ismail Traore	5	46	9	0-2	0.0	0-0	1-6	0	5	5	1.0	1	2	3	5	1	0.2
Fane Nouhoum	3	12	4	0-1	0.0	0-1	0-0	0	1	1	0.3	0	0	1	1	0	0.0
MALI	7	1400	200	161-411	39.2	25-102	131-218	72	151	223	31.9	23	36	61	113	478	68.3

Morocco

Player	MJ	Min	Mo	Tirs	%	3pts	LF	Ro	Rd	Tot	Moy	Co	Pd	In	Bp	Pts	Moy
Redouane Bouzidi	6	99	16	22-58	37.9	5-20	5-11	6	7	13	2.2	0	3	10	8	54	9.0
Ahmed Kajaj	5	87	17	15-46	32.6	8-19	3-7	4	9	13	2.6	0	1	6	6	41	8.2
Razak Taie	6	130	21	19-59	32.2	7-24	3-5	6	10	16	2.7	0	2	9	8	48	8.0
Rachid Abnane	5	72	14	16-32	50.0	2-6	4-6	3	8	11	2.2	0	1	5	1	38	7.6
Kamal Lichtaf	6	122	20	11-32	34.4	0-2	11-21	18	14	32	5.3	3	4	9	11	33	5.5
Nabil Souari	6	178	29	11-51	21.6	5-27	2-5	3	11	14	2.3	0	13	7	13	29	4.8
Mourad Fenjaoui	6	99	16	9-38	23.7	5-19	3-7	4	0	4	0.7	0	2	9	12	26	4.3
Mounir Bouhlal	6	126	21	10-31	32.3	0-1	3-10	11	24	35	5.8	6	2	6	8	23	3.8
Mohamed Mouak	6	94	15	5-19	26.3	0-6	2-2	3	6	9	1.5	1	7	3	17	12	2.0
Aziz Aitzizi	6	72	12	5-17	29.4	0-0	1-4	5	14	19	3.2	5	0	4	10	11	1.8
Rachi Takouri	4	27	6	3-5	60.0	0-0	1-2	4	1	5	1.3	1	0	1	2	7	1.8
Dahmane Fahd	6	94	15	1-9	11.1	0-1	0-0	1	5	6	1.0	0	0	4	3	2	0.3
Morocco	6	1200	200	127-397	32.0	32-125	38-80	68	109	177	29.5	16	35	73	99	324	54.0

Mozambique

Player	MJ	Min	Mo	Tirs	%	3pts	LF	Ro	Rd	Tot	Moy	Co	Pd	In	Bp	Pts	Moy
Benjamin Manhanga	6	156	26	20-48	41.7	2-15	5-10	11	21	32	5.3	1	11	7	19	47	7.8
Alberto De Devis	6	113	18	14-40	35.0	7-21	8-12	2	5	7	1.2	0	6	7	9	43	7.2
Carlos Ferro	6	91	15	14-50	28.0	9-30	4-5	3	5	8	1.3	0	7	9	6	41	6.8
Acacio Mambo	6	115	19	19-44	43.2	0-4	2-3	11	10	21	3.5	0	1	3	8	40	6.7
Cornelio Guibunda	6	166	27	17-54	31.5	0-0	5-10	20	11	31	5.2	11	3	5	12	39	6.5
Domingos Manjane	6	110	18	13-30	43.3	0-2	8-14	11	10	21	3.5	1	3	3	6	34	5.7
Khaimane De Devis	3	67	22	6-20	30.0	1-6	3-7	1	3	4	1.3	0	4	5	8	16	5.3
Janvario Mbeve	5	92	18	7-23	30.4	2-5	1-5	2	13	15	3.0	0	14	8	9	17	3.4
Silvio Neves	6	119	19	7-23	30.4	0-5	4-12	8	11	19	3.2	0	10	14	17	18	3.0
Samuel Manhanga	6	54	9	7-21	33.3	0-0	3-10	9	6	15	2.5	3	1	1	8	17	2.8
Felis Berto Macuacua	6	72	12	5-16	31.3	1-6	3-4	0	6	6	1.0	0	5	10	6	14	2.3
Victor Tamele	5	45	9	2-10	20.0	1-5	3-6	4	5	9	1.8	1	1	0	7	8	1.6
MOZAMBIQUE	6	1200	200	131-379	34.6	23-99	49-98	82	106	188	31.3	17	66	72	115	334	55.7

Nigeria

Player	MJ	Min	Mo	Tirs	%	3pts	LF	Ro	Rd	Tot	Moy	Co	Pd	In	Bp	Pts	Moy
Tunji Awojobi	7	222	31	39-85	45.9	2-6	40-53	14	28	42	6.0	4	21	15	20	120	17.1
Mohammed Acha	7	229	32	41-96	42.7	14-44	20-36	18	31	49	7.0	5	16	9	15	116	16.6
Daniel Okonkwo	7	220	31	25-46	54.3	2-11	14-18	13	17	30	4.3	0	9	15	10	66	9.4
Olumide Oyedeji	7	160	22	25-39	64.1	0-0	14-26	26	24	50	7.1	8	3	1	7	64	9.1
Kingsley Ogwundire	7	169	24	19-59	32.2	6-24	7-10	6	11	17	2.4	0	28	22	15	51	7.3
Godwin Owinje	7	121	17	14-32	43.8	0-1	10-16	13	13	26	3.7	1	5	3	6	38	5.4
Ayo Samuel	7	113	16	8-23	34.8	7-14	4-6	3	8	11	1.6	2	14	5	6	27	3.9
Benjamin Eze	6	56	9	6-16	37.5	0-0	5-12	6	6	12	2.0	4	1	1	3	17	2.8
Mufu Ibrahim	6	75	12	4-18	22.2	1-14	5-6	0	2	2	0.3	0	5	1	3	14	2.3
Baba Jubril	4	35	8	1-11	9.09	1-9	0-0	2	3	5	1.3	0	5	1	2	3	0.8
NIGERIA	7	1400	200	182-425	42.8	33-123	119-183	101	143	244	34.9	24	107	73	87	516	73.7

Senegal

Player	MJ	Min	Mo	Tirs	%	3pts	LF	Ro	Rd	Tot	Moy	Co	Pd	In	Bp	Pts	Moy
Mohamadou Sow	6	183	30	34-72	47.2	0-1	13-20	12	18	30	5.0	1	4	11	14	81	13.5
Assane N'Diaye	6	167	27	28-67	41.8	5-13	13-22	13	44	57	9.5	18	2	16	21	74	12.3
Raymond Carvalho	6	145	24	19-53	35.8	10-31	10-14	5	15	20	3.3	0	6	6	8	58	9.7
Masser N'Diaye	4	97	24	8-24	33.3	4-15	2-3	1	4	5	1.3	0	6	2	9	22	5.5
Souleymane Wane	6	87	14	14-27	51.9	0-0	4-5	7	25	32	5.3	4	2	4	6	32	5.3
Oumar Ba	6	79	13	8-24	33.3	2-8	13-18	6	3	9	1.5	1	4	5	13	31	5.2
Aly Ngone Niang	6	126	21	13-35	37.1	1-13	3-12	8	10	18	3.0	0	9	10	16	30	5.0
Bamba Seye	4	33	8	7-12	58.3	0-0	5-11	4	5	9	2.3	0	1	2	5	19	4.8
Vincent Da Sylva	6	98	16	11-44	25.0	2-10	4-8	10	9	19	3.2	0	11	2	11	28	4.7
Cheikh Amadou Thioune	5	40	8	5-11	45.5	0-0	5-8	1	2	3	0.6	0	2	3	4	15	3.0
Oumar Mar	5	94	18	5-16	31.3	1-5	0-2	4	6	10	2.0	1	9	6	12	11	2.2
Ch.-Henri Dieng	5	51	10	5-16	31.3	1-2	0-0	11	1	12	2.4	2	1	4	10	11	2.2
SENEGAL	6	1200	200	157-401	39.2	26-98	72-123	82	142	224	37.3	27	57	71	129	412	68.7

Tunisia

Player	MJ	Min	Mo	Tirs	%	3pts	LF	Ro	Rd	Tot	Moy	Co	Pd	In	Bp	Pts	Moy
Wassef Kechrid	4	122	30	23-62	37.1	5-22	15-20	1	11	12	3.0	5	12	9	11	66	16.5
Majdi Boulaabi	4	78	19	18-39	46.2	2-9	6-7	0	3	3	0.8	0	4	6	6	44	11.0
Heithem Essayed	3	72	24	11-24	45.8	2-11	7-13	3	4	7	2.3	0	2	1	4	31	10.3
Walid Zrida	4	149	37	8-17	47.1	4-9	2-4	2	10	12	3.0	0	12	8	12	22	5.5
Habib El Ouaer	4	107	26	9-26	34.6	1-6	1-2	7	17	24	6.0	1	4	5	6	20	5.0
Atef Maoua	3	33	11	5-13	38.5	1-4	2-2	3	5	8	2.7	1	1	1	3	13	4.3
Sofiane Tebbini	4	117	29	7-22	31.8	0-0	1-3	7	14	21	5.3	3	4	3	6	15	3.8
Slim Rajhi	3	11	3	3-5	60.0	1-2	3-4	0	2	2	0.7	0	1	1	2	10	3.3
Majdi Maalaoui	4	61	15	4-6	66.7	0-0	0-2	8	8	16	4.0	0	0	0	2	8	2.0
Amor Bouzgarou	3	26	8	2-4	50.0	1-2	0-0	0	1	1	0.3	0	4	2	2	5	1.7
Sami Ben Hazem	3	17	5	2-3	66.7	0-0	0-0	2	0	2	0.7	2	0	0	2	4	1.3
Ali Amri	2	7	3	0-6	0.0	0-1	0-0	0	1	1	0.5	0	0	0	2	0	0.0
TUNISIA	4	800	200	92-227	40.5	17-66	37-57	33	76	109	27.3	12	44	36	58	238	59.5
