= AfroBasket 2009 qualification =

The FIBA Africa Championship 2009 Qualification occurred on various dates between 4 August 2008 and 31 May 2009. It was used to determine which African national basketball teams would qualify for the FIBA Africa Championship 2009. Teams competed with other teams in their respective "zones" for a spot in the Championship tournament.

== Qualified Teams ==
Four teams qualified for the tournament before the qualification round took place. Ten more teams claimed spots in the tournament through Zonal Qualifying. One wildcard spot was reserved prior to the qualification round; because no team from Zone 7 registered, FIBA Africa gave out a second wildcard.

Qualified as the host nation:

- Libya

Qualified by finishing in the top three at the 2007 FIBA Africa Championship:

- Angola
- Cameroon
- Cape Verde

Qualified through Zonal Qualifying:

- Central African Republic
- Congo
- Ivory Coast
- Egypt
- Mali
- Morocco
- Mozambique
- Nigeria
- Rwanda
- Tunisia

Qualified via Wildcard Invitation:

- Senegal
- South Africa

== Qualifying round ==
Zone 1 (Salé, Morocco, 24–29 May 2009)

Qualified for the Final Tournament

Team	Pld	W	L	PF	PA	PD
Tunisia	4	3	1	302	264	+38
Morocco	4	2	2	293	297	-4
Algeria	4	1	3	251	285	-34

Morocco	66–70	Algeria
Algeria	59–74	Tunisia
Tunisia	77–80	Morocco
Algeria	68–73	Morocco
Tunisia	69–54	Algeria
Morocco	71–82	Tunisia

- Qualified before tournament:Libya (host)

Zone 2 (Bamako, Mali, 15–17 May 2009)

Team	Pld	W	L	PF	PA	PD
Mali	2	1	1	126	121	+5
Senegal	2	1	1	121	126	-5

Mali	69–61	Senegal
Senegal	60–57	Mali

- Did not enter:Mauritania, Guinea, Gambia, Guinea-Bissau, Sierra Leone
- Qualified before tournament:Cape Verde

Zone 3 (Yamoussoukro, Côte d'Ivoire, 4–10 August 2008)

Team	Pld	W	L	PF	PA	PD
Nigeria	4	3	1	256	196	+60
Ivory Coast	4	3	1	240	202	+38
Togo	4	0	4	184	206	-102

Togo	51–61	Ivory Coast
Ivory Coast	45–55	Nigeria
Nigeria	76–41	Togo
Ivory Coast	76–44	Togo
Nigeria	52–58	Ivory Coast
Nigeria	73–48	Togo

- Did not enter:Benin, Burkina Faso, Ghana, Liberia, Niger

Zone 4 (Bangui, Central African Republic, 26–31 May 2009)

Team	Pld	W	L	PF	PA	PD
Central African Republic	4	4	0	335	232	+103
Congo	4	1	3	292	339	-47
DR Congo	4	1	3	246	302	-56

Central African Republic	85–74	Congo
Congo	67–79	DR Congo
DR Congo	42–83	Central African Republic
Congo	65–101	Central African Republic
DR Congo	74–86	Congo
Central African Republic	66–51	DR Congo

- Did not enter:Equatorial Guinea, São Tomé and Príncipe, Gabon, Chad
- Qualified before tournament:Cameroon

Zone 5 (Kigali, Rwanda, 23 February - 1 March 2009)

Team	Pld	W	L	PF	PA	PD
Rwanda	4	4	0	345	231	+114
Egypt	4	3	1	332	213	+119
Kenya	4	2	2	282	324	-42
Burundi	4	1	3	250	355	-105
Uganda	4	0	4	284	370	-86

Kenya	39–101	Egypt
Rwanda	93–68	Uganda
Egypt	95–53	Uganda
Rwanda	100–55	Burundi
Burundi	50–95	Egypt
Kenya	96–83	Uganda
Kenya	80–59	Burundi
Burundi	86–80	Uganda
Kenya	67–81	Rwanda
Rwanda	71–41	Egypt

- Did not enter:Djibouti, Eritrea, Ethiopia, Somalia, Sudan, Tanzania

Zone 6 (Maputo, Mozambique, 30 March - 4 April 2009)

Team	Pld	W	L	PF	PA	PD
Mozambique	4	3	1	296	226	+70
South Africa	4	3	1	287	258	+29
Zimbabwe	4	0	4	198	297	-99

Zimbabwe	58–68	South Africa
Mozambique	74–41	Zimbabwe
South Africa	70–68	Mozambique
South Africa	82–51	Zimbabwe
Zimbabwe	48–73	Mozambique
Mozambique	81–67	South Africa

- Did not enter:Botswana, Lesotho, Malawi, Namibia, Swaziland, Zambia
- Qualified before qualifying tournament:Angola

Zone 7 (Mauritius, TBD)

Tournament was not held as no Zone 7 team met the registration deadline.

- Did not enter:Mauritius, Madagascar, Seychelles, Comoros
