= AfroBasket 2011 qualification =

The FIBA Africa Championship 2011 Qualification took place on various dates between 11 August 2010 and mid-2011. It was used to determine which African national basketball teams would qualify for the FIBA Africa Championship 2011. Teams competed with other teams in their respective "zones" for a spot in the Championship tournament.

== Qualified Teams ==
Four teams qualified for the tournament before the qualification round took place. Twelve more teams claimed spots in the tournament through Zonal Qualifying.

Qualified as the host nation:

- Ivory Coast

Qualified by finishing in the top four at the 2009 FIBA Africa Championship:

- Angola
- Tunisia
- Cameroon

Qualified through Zonal Qualifying:

- Mali
- Nigeria
- Senegal
- Togo
- Morocco
- Central African Republic
- Chad
- Mozambique
- Rwanda

== Qualifying round ==
Zone 1

Team	Pld	W	L	PF	PA	PD
Morocco	2	2	0	158	142	+16
Algeria	2	0	2	142	158	–16

- Qualified before tournament: Tunisia
- Did Not Participate: Libya

Zone 2 (Dakar, Senegal, August 11-August 18, 2010)

Senegal and Mali qualified for the tournament. Senegal qualified for its 25th consecutive appearance.

Team	Pld	W	L	PF	PA	PD	Tie
Senegal	6	6	0	454	299	+155	
Mali	6	3	3	403	379	+24	+4
Cape Verde	6	3	3	458	459	–1	–4
Guinea-Bissau	6	0	6	314	492	–178	

Guinea-Bissau	31–74	Senegal
Cape Verde	62–73	Mali
Mali	77–62	Guinea-Bissau
Senegal	84–65	Cape Verde
Guinea-Bissau	66–87	Cape Verde
Senegal	66–44	Mali
Cape Verde	78–71	Mali
Guinea-Bissau	35–74	Senegal
Mali	74–44	Guinea-Bissau
Cape Verde	60–89	Senegal
Guinea-Bissau	76–106	Cape Verde
Mali	64–67	Senegal

- Did Not Participate: Gambia, Guinea, Mauritania, Sierra Leone

Zone 3 (Lomé, Togo, August 10-August 16, 2010)

Nigeria and Togo qualify for the 2011 FIBA Africa Championship. Côte d'Ivoire, which had previously qualified for the tournament as hosts, qualified for the 2010 All-Africa Games by finishing second in the zone. Togo qualified for the first time since the FIBA Africa Championship 1978.

Team	Pld	W	L	PF	PA	PD
Nigeria	6	5	1	408	319	+89
Ivory Coast	6	4	2	362	351	+11
Togo	6	3	3	357	362	–5
Benin	6	0	6	314	409	–95

Togo	46–53	Ivory Coast
Benin	43–60	Nigeria
Ivory Coast	81–57	Benin
Nigeria	58–59	Togo
Nigeria	72–52	Ivory Coast
Togo	68–63	Benin
Benin	47–76	Nigeria
Ivory Coast	63–55	Togo
Benin	46–48	Ivory Coast
Togo	53–67	Nigeria
Nigeria	75–65	Ivory Coast
Togo	76–58	Benin

- Did not participate: Burkina Faso, Ghana, Liberia, Niger

Zone 4

Team	Pld	W	L	PF	PA	PD
Central African Republic	2	2	0	138	98	+40
Chad	2	0	2	98	138	–40

- Qualified before tournament: Cameroon
- Did not participate: Congo, DR Congo, Equatorial Guinea, Gabon, São Tomé and Príncipe

Zone 5

Team	Pld	W	L	PF	PA	PD
Rwanda	4	4	0	-	-	-
Kenya	4	3	1	-	-	-
Burundi	4	2	2	-	-	-
Uganda	4	1	3	-	-	-
Tanzania	4	0	4	-	-	-

- Did not participate: Djibouti, Egypt, Eritrea, Ethiopia, Somalia, Sudan

Zone 6

Team	Pld	W	L	PF	PA	PD
Mozambique	4	4	0	-	-	-
South Africa	4	3	1	-	-	-
Zimbabwe	4	2	2	-	-	-
Zambia	4	1	3	-	-	-
Malawi	4	0	4	-	-	-

- Qualified before tournament: Angola
- Did not participate: Botswana, Lesotho, Namibia, Swaziland

Zone 7

- Eligible teams: Comoros, Madagascar, Mauritius, Seychelles
