= AfroBasket 2025 qualification =

International qualification tournament

Tournament details
- Dates: 18 February 2024 – 23 February 2025
- Teams: 23

Official website
- Qualifiers website Pre-qualifiers website

The AfroBasket 2025 qualification is a basketball competition that was played from February 2024 to February 2025, to determine the fifteen FIBA Africa nations who joined the automatically qualified host, Angola, at the FIBA AfroBasket 2025 finals tournament.

== Pre-qualifiers ==
The participating teams were divided into four groups: Group A (Zones 1+2), Group B (Zones 3+4), Group C (Zone 5 + MAD + DJI) and Group D (Zone 6 + MRI + COM). The top teams in each zone qualified for the FIBA AfroBasket 2025 qualifiers, which started in February 2024.

=== Zone 1 + 2 ===
Zone 1 consisted of Algeria, Libya and Morocco. After Algeria withdrew, the remaining two teams played in a two-game series.

| Team 1 | Agg. | Team 2 | 1st leg | 2nd leg |
|---|---|---|---|---|
| Libya | 146–138 | Morocco | 75–75 | 71–63 |

| 18 February 2024 | Libya | 75–75 | Morocco | Monastir, Tunisia |
| 16:30 | Scoring by quarter: 25–11, 15–17, 25–21, 10–26 |
| | Pts: J. Salem 25; Rebs: J. Salem 9 Asts: Sadi 7 | Boxscore | Pts: Franceschi 25; Rebs: Azouga 6 Asts: Franceschi 5 | Arena: Mohamed-Mzali Sports Hall; Referees: Hassane Kamate (CIV), Youssouf Maiga (MLI), Guy Sani (CMR) |

| 20 February 2024 | Morocco | 63–71 | Libya | Monastir, Tunisia |
| 16:30 | Scoring by quarter: 9–25, 15–17, 18–17, 21–12 |
| | Pts: Benchlikha 12; Rebs: Azouga 11; Asts: Benchlikha, Boukichou 2 | Boxscore | Pts: J. Salem 19; Rebs: J. Salem 12; Asts: N. Salem 8 | Arena: Mohamed-Mzali Sports Hall; Referees: Hassane Kamate (CIV), Youssouf Maiga (MLI), Silver Houngbedji (BEN) |

=== Zone 3 + 4 ===
The remaining two teams played in a two-game series.

| Team 1 | Agg. | Team 2 | 1st leg | 2nd leg |
|---|---|---|---|---|
| Equatorial Guinea | 104–105 | Gabon | 58–66 | 46–39 |

| 28 February 2024 | Equatorial Guinea | 58–66 | Gabon | Malabo |
| | Scoring by quarter: 17–23, 15–17, 16–12, 10–14 |
| | Pts: Ngomo 15; Rebs: Nve 10; Asts: Ngomo 4 | Boxscore | Pts: Minko 16; Rebs: Essono 15; Asts: Ndoh-Mapangou 4 | Arena: Polideportivo de Malabo |

| 29 February 2024 | Gabon | 39–46 | Equatorial Guinea | Malabo, Equatorial Guinea |
| | Scoring by quarter: 9—14, 11—9, 12—14, 7—9 |
| | Pts: Essono 9 Rebs: Dimidimba 9 Asts: Ndoh-Mapangou 2 | Boxscore | Pts: Esteves 17; Rebs: Esteves 14; Asts: Esteves 3 | Arena: Polideportivo de Malabo |

=== Zone 5 + 7 ===
After several teams withdrew from the qualifiers, Madagascar qualified.

=== Zone 6 + 7 ===
South Africa and Mozambique played in a two-game series.

| Team 1 | Agg. | Team 2 | 1st leg | 2nd leg |
|---|---|---|---|---|
| Mozambique | 110–107 | South Africa | 62–50 | 48–57 |

| 23 February 2024 | Mozambique | 62–50 | South Africa | Maputo |
| 21:30 | Scoring by quarter: 19–18, 5–9, 18–13, 20–10 |
| | | Boxscore | | Arena: Pavilhão do Maxaquene; Referees: Mohammed Elmenshawy (EGY), Dorothy Okach (BOT), Amr Zahed (EGY) |

| 24 February 2024 | South Africa | 57–48 | Mozambique | Maputo, Mozambique |
| 20:00 | Scoring by quarter: 14–14, 14–11, 20–9, 9–14 |
| | Pts: Cele 19; Rebs: Sibanyoni 17; Asts: Selepe 5 | Boxscore | Pts: Houana 18; Rebs: Munguambe 9 Asts: da Costa 4 | Arena: Pavilhão do Maxaquene |

== Qualifiers ==
Qualified teams were the 16 teams qualified for African 2023 World Cup qualifiers first round + four teams from pre-qualifiers. Groups B, D and E played their first window in February 2024 and Groups A and C in November 2024.

=== Teams ===
| Entrance/qualification method | Team(s) |
|---|---|
| 2023 World Cup qualifiers first round | Angola; Cameroon; Cape Verde; Central African Republic; DR Congo; Egypt; Guinea; Ivory Coast; Kenya; Mali; Nigeria; Rwanda; Senegal; South Sudan; Tunisia; Uganda |
| Pre-Qualifiers Sub-zone 1 & 2 | Libya |
| Pre-Qualifiers Sub-zone 3 & 4 | Gabon |
| Pre-Qualifiers Sub-zone 5 & 7 | Madagascar |
| Pre-Qualifiers Sub-zone 6 & 7 | ~~Mozambique~~ |

- Morocco replaced Mozambique, who withdrew on 11 November 2024.

=== Draw ===
The draw was held on 24 November 2023 in South Africa.

| Pot 1 | Pot 2 | Pot 3 | Pot 4 |
|---|---|---|---|
| Tunisia; Ivory Coast; Senegal; Cape Verde; South Sudan | Angola; Nigeria; Egypt; Cameroon; DR Congo | Guinea; Central African Republic; Mali; Libya; Gabon | Uganda; Rwanda; Kenya; Madagascar; ~~Mozambique~~ |

| Group A | Group B | Group C | Group D | Group E |
|---|---|---|---|---|
| South Sudan; DR Congo; Mali; ~~Mozambique~~ | Cape Verde; Nigeria; Libya; Uganda | Senegal; Cameroon; Gabon; Rwanda | Ivory Coast; Egypt; Central African Republic; Madagascar | Tunisia; Angola; Guinea; Kenya |

- Morocco replaced Mozambique.

All times are local.

=== Group A ===
| Pos | Team | Pld | W | L | PF | PA | PD | Pts | Qualification |
|---|---|---|---|---|---|---|---|---|---|
| 1 | DR Congo | 6 | 5 | 1 | 411 | 401 | +10 | 11 | Final tournament |
| 2 | South Sudan | 6 | 4 | 2 | 464 | 372 | +92 | 10 | Final tournament |
| 3 | Mali | 6 | 3 | 3 | 404 | 422 | −18 | 9 | Final tournament |
| 4 | Morocco (Note: Morocco replaced Mozambique, who withdrew.) | 6 | 0 | 6 | 353 | 437 | −84 | 6 | |

Source: FIBA
Rules for classification: 1) points; 2) head-to-head points; 3) head-to-head points difference; 4) head-to-head number of points scored.
Notes:

| 22 November 2024 | South Sudan | 82–66 | Morocco | Dakar, Senegal |
| 12:00 | Scoring by quarter: 20–23, 16–11, 28–13, 18–19 |
| | Pts: Omot 17; Rebs: Deng 8 Asts: Makoi 6 | Boxscore | Pts: Choua 17; Rebs: Choua 8 Asts: El Mahsini 5 | Arena: Dakar Arena; Attendance: 50; Referees: Hassane Kamate (CIV), Jean Ruhamiriza (RWA), Guy Sani (CMR) |

| 22 November 2024 | DR Congo | 72–64 | Mali | Dakar, Senegal |
| 15:00 | Scoring by quarter: 15–17, 14–9, 20–18, 23–20 |
| | Pts: Lutete 20; Rebs: Sakho 9 Asts: Lutete 3 | Boxscore | Pts: Djambo 18; Rebs: A. Diarra 10; Asts: Kanouté 4 | Arena: Dakar Arena; Attendance: 150; Referees: Amir Taboubi (TUN), Claudio Eiuba (ANG), Haytham Ihaqaf (LBA) |

| 23 November 2024 | Mali | 60–85 | South Sudan | Dakar, Senegal |
| 12:00 | Scoring by quarter: 19–15, 13–24, 16–25, 12–21 |
| | Pts: Konaté 15; Rebs: A. Diarra 8 Asts: Djambo 6 | Boxscore | Pts: Kuany 17; Rebs: Gabriel 7 Asts: Makoi 10 | Arena: Dakar Arena; Attendance: 80; Referees: Sofiane Si Youcef (ALG), Guy Sani (CMR), Haytham Ihaqaf (LBA) |

| 23 November 2024 | Morocco | 65–74 | DR Congo | Dakar, Senegal |
| 15:00 | Scoring by quarter: 19–22, 20–19, 11–17, 15–16 |
| | Pts: Choua 22; Rebs: Choua 9 Asts: five players 2 | Boxscore | Pts: Lutete 27; Rebs: Lutete 8 Asts: Kamba 4 | Arena: Dakar Arena; Attendance: 500; Referees: Amr Aboollo (EGY), Walelign Gebeto (ETH), Oumar Sy (MTN) |

| 24 November 2024 | Mali | 66–64 | Morocco | Dakar, Senegal |
| 12:00 | Scoring by quarter: 20–18, 19–16, 17–11, 10–19 |
| | Pts: M. Diarra 15; Rebs: A. Diarra 10; Asts: Kanouté 6 | Boxscore | Pts: Choua, Nouhi 19; Rebs: Choua 15; Asts: three players 3 | Arena: Dakar Arena; Attendance: 100; Referees: Claudio Eiuba (ANG), Guy Sani (CMR), Jean Ruhamiriza (RWA) |

| 24 November 2024 | South Sudan | 69–76(OT) | DR Congo | Dakar, Senegal |
| 15:00 | Scoring by quarter: 21–15, 14–21, 13–16, 16–12, Overtime: 5–12 |
| | Pts: Gabriel 22; Rebs: Gabriel 15; Asts: Makoi 7 | Boxscore | Pts: Fula 21; Rebs: Sakho 11; Asts: Loubaki 5 | Arena: Dakar Arena; Attendance: 700; Referees: Hassane Kamaté (CIV), Amir Taboubi (TUN), Oumar Sy (MTN) |

| 21 February 2025 | Mali | 59–65 | DR Congo | Rabat, Morocco |
| 18:00 | Scoring by quarter: 15–19, 22–7, 11–12, 11–27 |
| | Pts: A. Diarra 22; Rebs: A. Diarra 14; Asts: C. Diarra 3 | Boxscore | Pts: Fula 16; Rebs: Sakho 14; Asts: Sakho 6 | Arena: Salle Moulay Abdellah; Attendance: 200; Referees: Amr Aboollo (EGY), Aymen Chakround (TUN), David Domingos (ANG) |

| 21 February 2025 | Morocco | 37–69 | South Sudan | Rabat |
| 21:00 | Scoring by quarter: 13–15, 13–19, 6–22, 5–13 |
| | Pts: Zouita 9 Rebs: Choua 9 Asts: Nouhi 3 | Boxscore | Pts: Acuil 21; Rebs: Acuil 9 Asts: Dech, Madut 4 | Arena: Salle Moulay Abdellah; Attendance: 2,000; Referees: Yann Davidson (MAD), Oumar Sy (MTN), Emmanuel Kpawogbo (BEN) |

| 22 February 2025 | DR Congo | 66–55 | Morocco | Rabat, Morocco |
| 18:00 | Scoring by quarter: 22–18, 20–5, 11–21, 13–11 |
| | Pts: Munanga 15; Rebs: Sakho, Thamba 5 Asts: Thamba 3 | Boxscore | Pts: Nouhi 18; Rebs: Choua 12; Asts: Choua 4 | Arena: Salle Moulay Abdellah; Attendance: 2,000; Referees: Hassane Kamaté (CIV), Oumar Sy (MTN), Amr Zahed (EGY) |

| 22 February 2025 | South Sudan | 72–75 | Mali | Rabat, Morocco |
| 21:00 | Scoring by quarter: 20–25, 28–17, 15–27, 9–6 |
| | Pts: Madut 16; Rebs: Acuil 11; Asts: Gach 6 | Boxscore | Pts: M. Diarra 19; Rebs: A. Diarra, M. Diarra 9 Asts: Kanouté 10 | Arena: Salle Moulay Abdellah; Attendance: 2,000; Referees: Amir Taboubi (TUN), Claudio Eiuba (ANG), Aymen Chakround (TUN) |

| 23 February 2025 | Morocco | 66–80 | Mali | Rabat |
| 18:00 | Scoring by quarter: 18–24, 20–18, 16–21, 12–17 |
| | Pts: Nouhi 23; Rebs: four players 5 Asts: Franceschi 3 | Boxscore | Pts: S. Kanouté 23; Rebs: A. Diarra 10; Asts: S. Kanouté 9 | Arena: Salle Moulay Abdellah; Attendance: 2,000; Referees: Hassane Kamate (CIV), David Domingos (ANG), Erick Otieno (KEN) |

| 23 February 2025 | DR Congo | 58–89 | South Sudan | Rabat, Morocco |
| 21:00 | Scoring by quarter: 9–27, 19–21, 16–24, 14–17 |
| | Pts: Nzosa 14; Rebs: Thamba 10; Asts: Shamba 6 | Boxscore | Pts: Kuath 15; Rebs: Acuil 10; Asts: Gach 7 | Attendance: 300; Referees: Yann Davidson (MAD), Oumar Sy (MTN), Zouhir Bouhabba (MAR) |

=== Group B ===
The games of the first window were played in Tunisia.

| Pos | Team | Pld | W | L | PF | PA | PD | Pts | Qualification |
|---|---|---|---|---|---|---|---|---|---|
| 1 | Libya | 6 | 4 | 2 | 449 | 434 | +15 | 10 | Final tournament |
| 2 | Cape Verde | 6 | 3 | 3 | 430 | 425 | +5 | 9 (Note: Cape Verde 3 Pts, +1 PD; Nigeria 3 Pts, −1 PD.) | Final tournament |
| 3 | Nigeria | 6 | 3 | 3 | 445 | 438 | +7 | 9 | Final tournament |
| 4 | Uganda | 6 | 2 | 4 | 400 | 427 | −27 | 8 | Final tournament |

Source: FIBA
Rules for classification: 1) points; 2) head-to-head points; 3) head-to-head points difference; 4) head-to-head number of points scored.
Notes:

| 23 February 2024 | Cape Verde | 78–73 | Uganda | Monastir, Tunisia |
| 11:00 | Scoring by quarter: 20–16, 14–16, 26–14, 18–27 |
| | Pts: Santos 15; Rebs: three players 6 Asts: Delgado 6 | Boxscore | Pts: Opong 25; Rebs: Womala 7 Asts: Drileba 5 | Arena: Mohamed-Mzali Sports Hall; Attendance: 150; Referees: Arnaud Kom Njilo (CMR), Amir Taboubi (TUN), Adlen Larouci (ALG) |

| 23 February 2024 | Nigeria | 82–89(OT) | Libya | Monastir, Tunisia |
| 20:00 | Scoring by quarter: 16–25, 19–15, 15–20, 25–15, Overtime: 7–14 |
| | Pts: Nuga 31; Rebs: Akhuetie 12; Asts: Eke 8 | Boxscore | Pts: Sadi 24; Rebs: Sadi 9 Asts: Sadi 12 | Arena: Mohamed-Mzali Sports Hall; Attendance: 150; Referees: Youssouf Maiga (MLI), Yann Davidson (MAD), Jean Ruhamiriza (RWA) |

| 24 February 2024 | Uganda | 72–62 | Nigeria | Monastir, Tunisia |
| 14:00 | Scoring by quarter: 12–7, 17–12, 26–25, 17–18 |
| | Pts: Opong 39; Rebs: Opong 10; Asts: Seiko, Womala 5 | Boxscore | Pts: Eke 19; Rebs: Akhuetie 16; Asts: Eke 7 | Arena: Mohamed-Mzali Sports Hall; Attendance: 100; Referees: Sofiane Si Youcef (ALG), Amir Taboubi (TUN), Sara El-Sharnouby (EGY) |

| 24 February 2024 | Libya | 68–72 | Cape Verde | Monastir, Tunisia |
| 20:00 | Scoring by quarter: 15–15, 24–25, 21–21, 8–11 |
| | Pts: Saeid 18; Rebs: Buzgaiya 9 Asts: Sadi 5 | Boxscore | Pts: Santos 16; Rebs: Santos 11; Asts: Correia 4 | Arena: Mohamed-Mzali Sports Hall; Attendance: 35; Referees: Hassane Kamaté (CIV), Silver Houngbedji (BEN), Jean Ruhamiriza (RWA) |

| 25 February 2024 | Libya | 71–59 | Uganda | Monastir, Tunisia |
| 14:00 | Scoring by quarter: 21–16, 19–13, 17–18, 14–12 |
| | Pts: Al-Maghribi, Hamad 16; Rebs: Sadi 9 Asts: Badrush 14 | Boxscore | Pts: Drileba 16; Rebs: Opong 9 Asts: Muhwezi 4 | Arena: Mohamed-Mzali Sports Hall; Attendance: 40; Referees: Arnaud Kom Njilo (CMR), Oumar Sy (MTN), Youssouf Maiga (MLI) |

| 25 February 2024 | Cape Verde | 78–62 | Nigeria | Monastir, Tunisia |
| 20:00 | Scoring by quarter: 16–24, 23–9, 21–18, 18–11 |
| | Pts: Spencer 16; Rebs: Lima 7 Asts: Almeida, Santos 4 | Boxscore | Pts: Eke 31; Rebs: Eke 9 Asts: Nuga 4 | Arena: Mohamed-Mzali Sports Hall; Attendance: 50; Referees: Wael Mostafa (EGY), Jean Ruhamiriza (RWA), Amir Taboubi (TUN) |

| 21 February 2025 | Uganda | 63–60 | Cape Verde | Tripoli, Libya |
| 18:00 | Scoring by quarter: 22–12, 6–12, 22–23, 13–13 |
| | Pts: Opong 22; Rebs: Komagum 8 Asts: Drileba, Wainright 3 | Boxscore | Pts: Gomes 17; Rebs: Gomes 6 Asts: Almeida 6 | Arena: Grand Hall; Attendance: 1,000; Referees: Wael Mostafa (EGY), Diallo Mahamadou (MLI), Adel Kahallou (ALG) |

| 21 February 2025 | Libya | 70–75 | Nigeria | Tripoli |
| 21:00 | Scoring by quarter: 15–14, 20–18, 16–20, 19–23 |
| | Pts: Albebas 23; Rebs: Hamad 9 Asts: Badrush 6 | Boxscore | Pts: Agada, Zanna 14; Rebs: Agada 10; Asts: Agada 6 | Arena: Grand Hall; Attendance: 2,000; Referees: Mohamed El-Menshawy (EGY), Michel Djeugoue (CMR), Adama Samaké (MLI) |

| 22 February 2025 | Nigeria | 87–67 | Uganda | Tripoli, Libya |
| 18:00 | Scoring by quarter: 12–16, 16–18, 27–25, 32–8 |
| | Pts: Agada 20; Rebs: Zanna 11; Asts: Agada 7 | Boxscore | Pts: Geu 20; Rebs: Komagum 8 Asts: Wainright 6 | Arena: Grand Hall; Attendance: 200; Referees: Mohamed El-Menshawy (EGY), Adel Kahallou (ALG), Adlen Larouci (ALG) |

| 22 February 2025 | Cape Verde | 80–82 | Libya | Tripoli, Libya |
| 21:00 | Scoring by quarter: 25–17, 17–22, 17–25, 21–18 |
| | Pts: Da Rosa 18; Rebs: Correia, Gomes 6 Asts: Da Rosa 4 | Boxscore | Pts: Badrush 20; Rebs: Sadi 12; Asts: Badrush, Sadi 6 | Arena: Grand Hall; Referees: Tonton Banza (DRC), Guy Sani (CMR), Diallo Mahamadou (MLI) |

| 23 February 2025 | Nigeria | 77–62 | Cape Verde | Tripoli, Libya |
| 18:00 | Scoring by quarter: 22–26, 26–7, 13–21, 16–8 |
| | Pts: Agada 23; Rebs: Akobundu-Ehiogu 9 Asts: Agada 6 | Boxscore | Pts: Almeida 15; Rebs: Almeida 8 Asts: Da Rosa 5 | Arena: Grand Hall; Attendance: 200; Referees: Wael Mostafa (EGY), Adel Kahallou (ALG), Mohamed El-Menshawy (EGY) |

| 23 February 2025 | Uganda | 66–69 | Libya | Tripoli, Libya |
| 21:00 | Scoring by quarter: 21–20, 11–24, 16–9, 18–16 |
| | Pts: Geu 25; Rebs: Komagum 13; Asts: Wainright 8 | Boxscore | Pts: Badrush 17; Rebs: Hamad 7 Asts: Badrush 8 | Arena: Grand Hall; Attendance: 5,000; Referees: Diallo Mahamadou (MLI), Guy Sani (CMR), Mohamed Diawari (MLI) |

=== Group C ===
| Pos | Team | Pld | W | L | PF | PA | PD | Pts | Qualification |
|---|---|---|---|---|---|---|---|---|---|
| 1 | Senegal | 6 | 6 | 0 | 550 | 417 | +133 | 12 | Final tournament |
| 2 | Cameroon | 6 | 4 | 2 | 473 | 435 | +38 | 10 | Final tournament |
| 3 | Rwanda | 6 | 2 | 4 | 445 | 467 | −22 | 8 | Final tournament |
| 4 | Gabon | 6 | 0 | 6 | 383 | 532 | −149 | 6 | |

Source: FIBA
Rules for classification: 1) points; 2) head-to-head points; 3) head-to-head points difference; 4) head-to-head number of points scored.

| 22 November 2024 | Senegal | 81–58 | Rwanda | Dakar |
| 18:00 | Scoring by quarter: 20–17, 23–14, 21–10, 17–17 |
| | Pts: Badio, Ndoye 14; Rebs: Badio, Gueye 7 Asts: Badio 6 | Boxscore | Pts: Robeyns 12; Rebs: Cadeaux de Dieu 9 Asts: Jackson 7 | Arena: Dakar Arena; Attendance: 1,500; Referees: Amr Aboollo (EGY), Walelign Gebeto (ETH), Sofiane Si Youcef (ALG) |

| 22 November 2024 | Cameroon | 76–58 | Gabon | Dakar, Senegal |
| 21:00 | Scoring by quarter: 28–12, 22–18, 14–20, 12–8 |
| | Pts: Choh 13; Rebs: Choh 7 Asts: Gbetkom 6 | Boxscore | Pts: Boukosso 15; Rebs: Siby 10; Asts: Boukosso 3 | Arena: Dakar Arena; Attendance: 200; Referees: Tonton Banza (DRC), Diallo Mahamadou (MLI), Adlen Larouci (ALG) |

| 23 November 2024 | Gabon | 58–101 | Senegal | Dakar, Senegal |
| 18:00 | Scoring by quarter: 5–22, 24–24, 12–31, 17–24 |
| | Pts: Boukosso 11; Rebs: Siby 8 Asts: Siby 3 | Boxscore | Pts: Badio 20; Rebs: Camara 9 Asts: Boissy 7 | Arena: Dakar Arena; Attendance: 1,700; Referees: Amir Taboubi (TUN), Tonton Banza (DRC), Jacques Houngbedji (BEN) |

| 23 November 2024 | Rwanda | 59–70 | Cameroon | Dakar, Senegal |
| 21:00 | Scoring by quarter: 20–25, 8–22, 15–11, 16–12 |
| | Pts: Jackson 23; Rebs: Cadeaux de Dieu, Jackson 6 Asts: Jackson 5 | Boxscore | Pts: Ateba 17; Rebs: Narace 14; Asts: Hill 6 | Arena: Dakar Arena; Attendance: 500; Referees: Hassane Kamaté (CIV), Claudio Eiuba (ANG), Diallo Mahamadou (MLI) |

| 24 November 2024 | Senegal | 87–83 | Cameroon | Dakar |
| 18:00 | Scoring by quarter: 25–21, 19–17, 20–23, 23–22 |
| | Pts: Badio 31; Rebs: three players 7 Asts: Badio, Mané 4 | Boxscore | Pts: Narace 19; Rebs: four players 4 Asts: Hill 9 | Arena: Dakar Arena; Attendance: 1,000; Referees: Amr Aboollo (EGY), Sofiane Si Youcef (ALG), Walelign Gebeto (ETH) |

| 24 November 2024 | Gabon | 63–90 | Rwanda | Dakar, Senegal |
| 21:00 | Scoring by quarter: 21–28, 13–22, 15–15, 14–25 |
| | Pts: Missouma 16; Rebs: Dimidimba 12; Asts: Siby 2 | Boxscore | Pts: Shema 20; Rebs: Furaha 11; Asts: Jackson 11 | Arena: Dakar Arena; Attendance: 100; Referees: Diallo Mahamadou (MLI), Haytham Ihaqaf (LBA), Silver Houngbedji (BEN) |

| 21 February 2025 | Gabon | 65–82 | Cameroon | Rabat, Morocco |
| 12:00 | Scoring by quarter: 12–15, 15–27, 18–19, 20–21 |
| | Pts: Silva 34; Rebs: Silva 14; Asts: three players 2 | Boxscore | Pts: Eboua 12; Rebs: Eboua 8 Asts: Hill 5 | Arena: Salle Moulay Abdellah; Attendance: 469; Referees: Hassane Kamaté (CIV), Amr Zahed (EGY), Zouhir Bouhabba (MAR) |

| 21 February 2025 | Rwanda | 73–96 | Senegal | Rabat, Morocco |
| 15:00 | Scoring by quarter: 13–13, 17–35, 20–20, 23–28 |
| | Pts: Robeyns 18; Rebs: three players 7 Asts: Jackson 5 | Boxscore | Pts: Boissy 19; Rebs: Ndoye 11; Asts: Mané 7 | Arena: Salle Moulay Abdellah; Attendance: 200; Referees: Amir Taboubi (TUN), Claudio Eiuba (ANG), Silver Houngbedji (BEN) |

| 22 February 2025 | Senegal | 102–68 | Gabon | Rabat, Morocco |
| 12:00 | Scoring by quarter: 25–23, 18–11, 29–15, 20–19 |
| | Pts: N'Diaye 21; Rebs: N'Diaye 15; Asts: Mané 8 | Boxscore | Pts: Silva 28; Rebs: Silva 12; Asts: Silva 5 | Arena: Salle Moulay Abdellah; Referees: Amr Aboollo (EGY), Erick Otieno (KEN), Mohamed Cissé (GUI) |

| 22 February 2025 | Cameroon | 86–83 | Rwanda | Rabat, Morocco |
| 15:00 | Scoring by quarter: 28–28, 20–16, 14–25, 24–14 |
| | Pts: Eboua, Hill 22; Rebs: Eboua 10; Asts: Hill 6 | Boxscore | Pts: Mpoyo 26; Rebs: Habimana, Shema 6 Asts: Habimana 9 | Arena: Salle Moulay Abdellah; Attendance: 250; Referees: Yann Davidson (MAD), David Domingos (ANG), Silver Houngbedji (BEN) |

| 23 February 2025 | Rwanda | 81–71 | Gabon | Rabat, Morocco |
| 12:00 | Scoring by quarter: 24–16, 17–18, 23–19, 17–18 |
| | Pts: Habimana 18; Rebs: Habimana 8 Asts: Habimana 5 | Boxscore | Pts: Akoue 18; Rebs: Silva 16; Asts: Silva 6 | Arena: Salle Moulay Abdellah; Attendance: 100; Referees: Amir Taboubi (TUN), Aymen Chakround (TUN), Emmanuel Kpawogbo (BEN) |

| 23 February 2025 | Cameroon | 76–82(OT) | Senegal | Rabat, Morocco |
| 15:00 | Scoring by quarter: 17–20, 13–19, 16–20, 23–10, Overtime: 7–14 |
| | Pts: Narace 22; Rebs: Ateba 9 Asts: Hill 10 | Boxscore | Pts: Badio 17; Rebs: Mané 10; Asts: Badio 6 | Arena: Salle Moulay Abdellah; Attendance: 100; Referees: Amr Aboollo (EGY), Claudio Eiuba (ANG), Amr Zahed (EGY) |

=== Group D ===
The games of the first window were played in Egypt.

| Pos | Team | Pld | W | L | PF | PA | PD | Pts | Qualification |
|---|---|---|---|---|---|---|---|---|---|
| 1 | Ivory Coast | 6 | 6 | 0 | 537 | 437 | +100 | 12 | Final tournament |
| 2 | Egypt | 6 | 3 | 3 | 480 | 441 | +39 | 9 | Final tournament |
| 3 | Madagascar | 6 | 2 | 4 | 441 | 516 | −75 | 8 | Final tournament |
| 4 | Central African Republic | 6 | 1 | 5 | 431 | 495 | −64 | 7 | |

Source: FIBA
Rules for classification: 1) points; 2) head-to-head points; 3) head-to-head points difference; 4) head-to-head number of points scored.

| 23 February 2024 | Ivory Coast | 77–69 | Madagascar | Cairo, Egypt |
| 16:00 | Scoring by quarter: 14–11, 26–19, 16–17, 21–22 |
| | Pts: Poythress 26; Rebs: Fofana, Mobio 9 Asts: Moularé 7 | Boxscore | Pts: Raharimanantoanina 12; Rebs: Faralahy 10; Asts: Randriamampionona 5 | Arena: Hassan Moustafa Sports Hall; Attendance: 100; Referees: Amr Aboollo (EGY), Walelign Gebeto (ETH), Claudio Eiuba (ANG) |

| 23 February 2024 | Egypt | 76–61 | Central African Republic | Cairo |
| 19:00 | Scoring by quarter: 29–15, 14–16, 20–13, 13–17 |
| | Pts: Mahmoud 19; Rebs: Mahmoud 7 Asts: Gendy 6 | Boxscore | Pts: Ganapamo 27; Rebs: Dokossi 14; Asts: Dokossi, Kouguère 4 | Arena: Hassan Moustafa Sports Hall; Attendance: 200; Referees: Tonton Banza (DRC), Diallo Mahamadou (MLI), Didier Gaga (RWA) |

| 24 February 2024 | Central African Republic | 67–93 | Ivory Coast | Cairo, Egypt |
| 16:00 | Scoring by quarter: 16–28, 15–25, 20–26, 16–14 |
| | Pts: Ganapamo 15; Rebs: Dokossi 8 Asts: Kouguère 3 | Boxscore | Pts: Poythress 17; Rebs: Poythress 6 Asts: Moularé 7 | Arena: Hassan Moustafa Sports Hall; Attendance: 100; Referees: Tonton Banza (DRC), Amr Aboollo (EGY), Erick Otieno (KEN) |

| 24 February 2024 | Madagascar | 66–97 | Egypt | Cairo, Egypt |
| 19:00 | Scoring by quarter: 14–23, 20–27, 19–20, 13–27 |
| | Pts: Ravelojaona 18; Rebs: Solondrainy 10; Asts: Randriamampionona 4 | Boxscore | Pts: Shehata 17; Rebs: Mahmoud 10; Asts: Helmy, Metwaly 5 | Arena: Hassan Moustafa Sports Hall; Attendance: 500; Referees: Diallo Mahamadou (MLI), Didier Gaga (RWA), Walelign Gebeto (ETH) |

| 25 February 2024 | Central African Republic | 69–76 | Madagascar | Cairo, Egypt |
| 16:00 | Scoring by quarter: 17–18, 20–11, 17–22, 15–25 |
| | Pts: Dokossi 19; Rebs: Dokossi 12; Asts: Dokossi 4 | Boxscore | Pts: Randriamampionona 22; Rebs: Raharimanantoanina 12; Asts: Randriamampionona 7 | Arena: Hassan Moustafa Sports Hall; Attendance: 100; Referees: Amr Aboollo (EGY), Erick Otieno (KEN), Claudio Eiuba (ANG) |

| 25 February 2024 | Ivory Coast | 79–76 | Egypt | Cairo, Egypt |
| 19:00 | Scoring by quarter: 26–26, 20–14, 15–18, 18–18 |
| | Pts: Poythress 20; Rebs: Dally, Poythress 9 Asts: Moularé 5 | Boxscore | Pts: Gendy 30; Rebs: Mahmoud 7 Asts: Gendy 10 | Arena: Hassan Moustafa Sports Hall; Attendance: 1,000; Referees: Tonton Banza (DRC), Walelign Gebeto (ETH), Diallo Mahamadou (MLI) |

| 21 February 2025 | Central African Republic | 71–75 | Egypt | Antananarivo, Madagascar |
| 14:00 | Scoring by quarter: 20–19, 19–17, 13–23, 19–16 |
| | Pts: Washington 21; Rebs: Dokossi 13; Asts: Washington 7 | Boxscore | Pts: Amin 14; Rebs: Mahmoud 10; Asts: Mahmoud 6 | Arena: Palais des Sports Mahamasina; Attendance: 2,000; Referees: Haja Ranaivoson (MAD), Walelign Gebeto (ETH), Mohamed Shabani (TUN) |

| 21 February 2025 | Madagascar | 73–106 | Ivory Coast | Antananarivo |
| 17:00 | Scoring by quarter: 9–26, 15–31, 18–18, 31–31 |
| | Pts: M'Madi 17; Rebs: M'Madi 7 Asts: M'Madi 4 | Boxscore | Pts: Costello 20; Rebs: Fofana 12; Asts: Diabate 7 | Arena: Palais des Sports Mahamasina; Attendance: 4,400; Referees: Arnold Moseya (RSA), Didier Gaga (RWA), Francisco Tando (ANG) |

| 22 February 2025 | Egypt | 80–82 | Madagascar | Antananarivo, Madagascar |
| 16:00 | Scoring by quarter: 16–30, 22–11, 25–17, 17–24 |
| | Pts: Mohamed 20; Rebs: Abdelgawad, Mahmoud 8 Asts: Amin, Metwaly 4 | Boxscore | Pts: M'Madi 18; Rebs: Raharimanantoanina 13; Asts: M'Madi 6 | Arena: Palais des Sports Mahamasina; Attendance: 3,500; Referees: Sofiane Si Youcef (ALG), Walelign Gebeto (ETH), Francisco Tando (ANG) |

| 22 February 2025 | Ivory Coast | 100–76 | Central African Republic | Antananarivo, Madagascar |
| 19:00 | Scoring by quarter: 35–15, 21–17, 19–20, 25–24 |
| | Pts: Zouzoua 19; Rebs: Fofana 8 Asts: Diabate 5 | Boxscore | Pts: Washington 27; Rebs: Dokossi 13; Asts: Washington 6 | Arena: Palais des Sports Mahamasina; Attendance: 200; Referees: Arnold Moseya (RSA), Haja Ranaivoson (MAD), Didier Gaga (RWA) |

| 23 February 2025 | Madagascar | 75–87 | Central African Republic | Antananarivo |
| 16:00 | Scoring by quarter: 17–25, 26–23, 17–21, 15–18 |
| | Pts: Randriamampionona 19; Rebs: Randriamampionona 7 Asts: Lahontan 7 | Boxscore | Pts: Washington 24; Rebs: Dokossi 19; Asts: Washington 7 | Arena: Palais des Sports Mahamasina; Attendance: 5,300; Referees: Sofiane Si Youcef (ALG), Walelign Gebeto (ETH), Mohamed Shabani (TUN) |

| 23 February 2025 | Egypt | 76–82 | Ivory Coast | Antananarivo, Madagascar |
| 19:00 | Scoring by quarter: 25–13, 13–14, 17–24, 21–31 |
| | Pts: Amin 21; Rebs: Abdelgawad 10; Asts: Amin, Kejo 3 | Boxscore | Pts: Zouzoua 20; Rebs: Costello 11; Asts: three players 3 | Arena: Palais des Sports Mahamasina; Attendance: 2,300; Referees: Arnold Moseya (RSA), Haja Ranaivoson (MAD), Didier Gaga (RWA) |

=== Group E ===
The games of the first window were played in Tunisia.

| Pos | Team | Pld | W | L | PF | PA | PD | Pts | Qualification |
|---|---|---|---|---|---|---|---|---|---|
| 1 | Tunisia | 6 | 5 | 1 | 403 | 356 | +47 | 11 | Final tournament |
| 2 | Angola (Note: Angola had already qualified as the host nation for the final tournament.) | 6 | 4 | 2 | 463 | 397 | +66 | 10 | Final tournament as the hosts |
| 3 | Guinea | 6 | 2 | 4 | 408 | 414 | −6 | 8 | Final tournament |
| 4 | Kenya | 6 | 1 | 5 | 310 | 417 | −107 | 6 | |

Source: FIBA
Rules for classification: 1) points; 2) head-to-head points; 3) head-to-head points difference; 4) head-to-head number of points scored.
Notes:

| 23 February 2024 | Angola | 76–70 | Guinea | Monastir, Tunisia |
| 14:00 | Scoring by quarter: 8–9, 21–24, 15–22, 32–15 |
| | Pts: Bango 24; Rebs: Bango 9 Asts: Dundão 9 | Boxscore | Pts: Evans 26; Rebs: Condé 7 Asts: Evans, Sy 3 | Arena: Mohamed-Mzali Sports Hall; Attendance: 150; Referees: Sofiane Si Youcef (ALG), Sara El-Sharnouby (EGY), Haytham Ihaqaf (LBA) |

| 23 February 2024 | Tunisia | 90–69 | Kenya | Monastir |
| 17:00 | Scoring by quarter: 25–11, 20–15, 19–20, 26–23 |
| | Pts: Lahyani 15; Rebs: Ben Romdhane 9 Asts: Jawadi 7 | Boxscore | Pts: Odero 25; Rebs: Owili, Wisyuba 5 Asts: Odero 4 | Arena: Mohamed-Mzali Sports Hall; Attendance: 1,000; Referees: Hassane Kamaté (CIV), Guy Sani (CMR), Oumar Sy (MTN) |

| 24 February 2024 | Kenya | 58–88 | Angola | Monastir, Tunisia |
| 11:00 | Scoring by quarter: 12–22, 21–22, 15–20, 10–24 |
| | Pts: Adera, Ogechi 12; Rebs: Awich 8 Asts: Odero 6 | Boxscore | Pts: Bango 19; Rebs: Bango 8 Asts: Dundão, Gonçalves 7 | Arena: Mohamed-Mzali Sports Hall; Attendance: 100; Referees: Wael Mostafa (EGY), Adlen Larouci (ALG), Haytham Ihaqaf (LBA) |

| 24 February 2024 | Guinea | 78–85(OT) | Tunisia | Monastir, Tunisia |
| 17:00 | Scoring by quarter: 15–18, 14–19, 18–19, 26–17, Overtime: 5–12 |
| | Pts: Condé 21; Rebs: Condé 8 Asts: Evans 6 | Boxscore | Pts: Abada 21; Rebs: Ben Romdhane 9 Asts: Abada, Ben Romdhane 6 | Arena: Mohamed-Mzali Sports Hall; Attendance: 1,000; Referees: Arnaud Kom Njilo (CMR), Yann Davidson (MAD), Oumar Sy (MTN) |

| 25 February 2024 | Guinea | 74–80 | Kenya | Monastir, Tunisia |
| 11:00 | Scoring by quarter: 19–24, 17–25, 22–15, 16–16 |
| | Pts: Evans 29; Rebs: Condé 10; Asts: Sy 5 | Boxscore | Pts: Odero 19; Rebs: Awich, Koranga 8 Asts: three players 3 | Arena: Mohamed-Mzali Sports Hall; Attendance: 33; Referees: Sara El-Sharnouby (EGY), Sofiane Si Youcef (ALG), Silver Houngbedji (BEN) |

| 25 February 2024 | Tunisia | 82–73 | Angola | Monastir |
| 17:00 | Scoring by quarter: 19–25, 15–13, 28–13, 20–22 |
| | Pts: Abada 19; Rebs: Ben Romdhane 7 Asts: Abada 8 | Boxscore | Pts: Gakou 19; Rebs: Gakou, Bango 6 Asts: Gonçalves 8 | Arena: Mohamed-Mzali Sports Hall; Attendance: 1,000; Referees: Yann Davidson (MAD), Hassane Kamaté (CIV), Guy Sani (CMR) |

| 21 February 2025 | Guinea | 66–65 | Angola | Tripoli, Libya |
| 12:00 | Scoring by quarter: 22–17, 12–16, 19–17, 13–15 |
| | Pts: Dramé 17; Rebs: Dramé 9 Asts: Doumbia 5 | Boxscore | Pts: Gakou 18; Rebs: Gonçalves 6 Asts: Dundão 9 | Arena: Grand Hall; Referees: Guy Sani (CMR), Adlen Larouci (ALG), Mohamed Diawari (MLI) |

| 21 February 2025 | Kenya | 0–20 (Note: Kenya forfeited this game, as it did not arrive in time.) | Tunisia | Tripoli, Libya |
| 15:00 |
| | | Boxscore | | Arena: Grand Hall |

| 22 February 2025 | Tunisia | 64–63 | Guinea | Tripoli, Libya |
| 12:00 | Scoring by quarter: 20–14, 10–25, 12–15, 22–9 |
| | Pts: Marnaoui 15; Rebs: Ghyaza 8 Asts: Abada 6 | Boxscore | Pts: Doumbia 13; Rebs: Keita 8 Asts: Doumbia 8 | Arena: Grand Hall; Attendance: 100; Referees: Youssouf Maiga (MLI), Michel Djeugoue (CMR), Gnoambilé Mockey (CIV) |

| 22 February 2025 | Angola | 88–59 | Kenya | Tripoli, Libya |
| 15:00 | Scoring by quarter: 21–25, 29–10, 15–15, 23–9 |
| | Pts: Dundão, Gakou 25; Rebs: Bango 8 Asts: Dundão 11 | Boxscore | Pts: Okoth 13; Rebs: Ongwae, Wamukota 6 Asts: Ongwae 6 | Arena: Grand Hall; Attendance: 200; Referees: Wael Mostafa (EGY), Haytham Ihaqaf (LBA), Papa Seye (SEN) |

| 23 February 2025 | Kenya | 44–57 | Guinea | Tripoli, Libya |
| 12:00 | Scoring by quarter: 8–15, 13–16, 17–14, 6–12 |
| | Pts: Ongwae 12; Rebs: Ongwae 13; Asts: Owili 4 | Boxscore | Pts: Evans 20; Rebs: Keita 11; Asts: Dramé, Evans 4 | Arena: Grand Hall; Referees: Tonton Banza (DRC), Adlen Larouci (ALG), Haytham Ihaqaf (LBA) |

| 23 February 2025 | Angola | 73–62 | Tunisia | Tripoli, Libya |
| 15:00 | Scoring by quarter: 7–11, 25–16, 19–25, 22–10 |
| | Pts: Dundão 31; Rebs: Bango 10; Asts: Dundão 5 | Boxscore | Pts: Slimane 17; Rebs: three players 4 Asts: Jaziri 4 | Arena: Grand Hall; Attendance: 300; Referees: Youssouf Maiga (MLI), Papa Seye (SEN), Adama Samaké (MLI) |

== Qualified teams ==
| Team | Qualification method | Date of qualification | Appearance(s) | | | | Previous best performance (Note: Bold text indicates they hosted that edition.) | WR (Note: World ranking at start of tournament.) |
| Team | Qualification method | Date of qualification | Total | First | Last | Streak | Previous best performance | WR |
|---|---|---|---|---|---|---|---|---|
| Angola | Host nation | 27 March 2024 | 22nd | 1980 | 2021 | 22 | Champions (Eleven times) (Note: Angola has won in 1989, 1992, 1993, 1995, 1999, 2001, 2003, 2005, 2007, 2009, and 2013.) | 33 |
| DR Congo | Group A top three | 21 February 2025 | 8th | 1974 | 2021 | 3 | Fourth place (1975) | 72 |
| Senegal | Group C top three | 21 February 2025 | 30th | 1964 | 2021 | 30 | Champions (1968, 1972, 1978, 1980, 1997) | 47 |
| Cameroon | Group C top three | 21 February 2025 | 11th | 1972 | 2021 | 8 | Runners-up (2007) | 64 |
| Ivory Coast | Group D top three | 21 February 2025 | 25th | 1968 | 2021 | 23 | Champions (1981, 1985) | 31 |
| Egypt | Group D top three | 21 February 2025 | 25th | 1962 | 2021 | 13 | Champions (1962, 1964, 1970, 1975, 1983) | 38 |
| Tunisia | Group E top three | 21 February 2025 | 24th | 1964 | 2021 | 12 | Champions (2011, 2017, 2021) | 36 |
| South Sudan | Group A top three | 21 February 2025 | 2nd | 2021 | 2021 | 2 | Seventh place (2021) | 23 |
| Madagascar | Group D top three | 22 February 2025 | 4th | 1972 | 2011 | 1 | Ninth place (1972) | 105 |
| Mali | Group A top three | 22 February 2025 | 21st | 1964 | 2021 | 9 | Third place (1972) | 83 |
| Guinea | Group E top three | 23 February 2025 | 7th | 1962 | 2021 | 3 | Fourth place (1962) | 75 |
| Rwanda | Group C top three | 23 February 2025 | 7th | 1989 | 2021 | 3 | Ninth place (2009) | 93 |
| Uganda | Group B top four | 23 February 2025 | 4th | 2015 | 2021 | 4 | Sixth place (2021) | 85 |
| Nigeria | Group B top four | 23 February 2025 | 20th | 1972 | 2021 | 14 | Champions (2015) | 42 |
| Cape Verde | Group B top four | 23 February 2025 | 8th | 1997 | 2021 | 2 | Third place (2007) | 45 |
| Libya | Group B top four | 23 February 2025 | 5th | 1965 | 2009 | 1 | Fifth place (1970) | 94 |
