= AfroBasket 2013 qualification =

African basketball

The 2013 FIBA Africa Championship Qualification occurred on various dates between 8 July 2012 and 23 February 2013. It was used to determine which African national basketball teams would qualify for the 2013 FIBA Africa Championship. Teams competed with other teams in their respective "zones" for a spot in the Championship tournament.

== Qualified Teams ==
Four teams qualified for the tournament before the qualification round took place. Twelve more teams claimed spots in the tournament through Zonal Qualifying.

Qualified as the host nation:

- Ivory Coast

Qualified by finishing in the top four at the 2013 FIBA Africa Championship:

- Angola
- Nigeria
- Tunisia

Qualified through Zonal Qualifying:

- Algeria
- Burkina Faso
- Cameroon
- Cape Verde
- Central African Republic
- Congo
- Egypt
- Morocco
- Mozambique
- Senegal

Qualified through a wildcard:

- Mali
- Rwanda

== Zones ==
=== Zone 1 ===
Zone 1 was played from 15 to 17 July 2012 in Staouéli and Algiers, Algeria.

Team	Pld	W	L	PF	PA	PD	Pts
Morocco	2	1	1	143	140	+3	3
Algeria	2	1	1	140	143	−3	3

15 July 2012
18:00

Morocco	75–71 (OT)	Algeria

17 July 2012
18:00

Algeria	69–68	Morocco

=== Zone 2 ===
Zone 2 was played from 12 to 18 August 2012 in Praia, Cape Verde.

Team	Pld	W	L	PF	PA	PD	Pts
Senegal	6	5	1	486	368	+118	11
Cape Verde	6	4	2	495	396	+99	10
Mali	6	3	3	394	384	+10	9
Mauritania	6	0	6	333	560	−227	6

12 August 2012
17:00

Mali	54–68	Senegal

12 August 2012
19:30

Cape Verde	99–57	Mauritania

13 August 2012
17:00

Mali	89–53	Mauritania

13 August 2012
19:30

Cape Verde	92–82	Senegal

14 August 2012
17:00

Senegal	111–59	Mauritania

14 August 2012
19:30

Cape Verde	60–70	Mali

16 August 2012
17:00

Senegal	67–59	Mali

16 August 2012
19:30

Mauritania	56–112	Cape Verde

17 August 2012
17:00

Mauritania	56–59	Mali

17 August 2012
19:30

Senegal	68–52	Cape Verde

18 August 2012
17:00

Mauritania	52–90	Senegal

18 August 2012
19:30

Mali	63–80	Cape Verde

=== Zone 3 ===
Zone 3 was played from 8 to 10 July 2012 in Ouagadougou, Burkina Faso.

Team	Pld	W	L	PF	PA	PD	Pts
Burkina Faso	2	1	1	133	125	+8	3
Togo	2	1	1	125	133	−8	3

8 July 2012
19:00

Togo	57–74	Burkina Faso

10 July 2012
18:00

Burkina Faso	59–68	Togo

=== Zone 4 ===
Zone 4 was played from 30 September to 11 October 2012 in Bangui, Central African Republic.

Team	Pld	W	L	PF	PA	PD	Pts
Central African Republic	6	5	1	436	374	+62	11
Cameroon	6	4	2	407	388	+19	10
Congo	6	2	4	402	436	−34	8
DR Congo	6	1	5	426	473	−47	7

30 September 2012
18:30

Central African Republic	80–53	Congo

1 October 2012
18:00

Central African Republic	79–58	Cameroon

2 October 2012
16:00

Central African Republic	74–68	DR Congo

2 October 2012
18:00

Cameroon	69–60	Congo

3 October 2012
18:00

Cameroon	87–63	DR Congo

4 October 2012
18:00

DR Congo	81–92	Congo

5 October 2012
18:00

Congo	74–68	DR Congo

5 October 2012
20:00

Cameroon	54–63	Central African Republic

6 October 2012
18:00

DR Congo	64–67	Cameroon

6 October 2012
20:00

Congo	64–71	Central African Republic

7 October 2012
18:00

Congo	59–62	Cameroon

7 October 2012
20:00

DR Congo	77–69	Central African Republic

=== Zone 5 ===
Zone 5 was played from 20 to 26 January 2013 in Dar es Salaam, Tanzania.

Group A

Team	Pld	W	L	PF	PA	PD	Pts
Egypt	3	3	0	271	176	+95	6
Rwanda	3	2	1	217	237	−20	5
Uganda	3	1	2	232	236	−4	4
Tanzania	3	0	3	174	245	−71	3

21 January 2013
17:00

Tanzania	66–80	Uganda

21 January 2013
19:00

Egypt	96–57	Rwanda

22 January 2013
16:00

Egypt	95–52	Tanzania

22 January 2013
20:00

Uganda	85–90	Rwanda

23 January 2013
12:00

Egypt	80–67	Uganda

23 January 2013
16:00

Rwanda	70–56	Tanzania

Group B

Team	Pld	W	L	PF	PA	PD	Pts
Somalia	2	2	0	179	158	+21	4
Kenya	2	1	1	149	144	+5	3
Burundi	2	0	2	143	169	−26	2

21 January 2013
14:00

Burundi	63–71	Kenya

22 January 2013
14:00

Kenya	78–81	Somalia

23 January 2013
20:00

Burundi	80–98	Somalia

Placement round

Team	Pld	W	L	PF	PA	PD	Pts
Uganda	2	1	1	173	152	+21	3
Burundi	2	1	1	155	160	−5	3
Tanzania	2	1	1	137	153	−16	3

24 January 2013
14:00

Uganda	86–89	Burundi

25 January 2013
16:00

Tanzania	74–66	Burundi

26 January 2013
16:00

Tanzania	63–87	Uganda

Final round

Semi-finals
25 January 2013
Egypt	88
Kenya	41
25 January 2013
Somalia	83
Rwanda	86

Final
26 January 2013
Egypt	82
Rwanda	76
Third place
26 January 2013
Kenya	72
Somalia	63

=== Zone 6 ===
Zone 6 was played from 17 to 23 February 2013 in Maputo, Mozambique.

Team	Pld	W	L	PF	PA	PD	Pts
Mozambique	5	5	0	415	183	+232	10
Zambia	5	3	2	307	297	+10	8
Botswana	5	1	4	233	386	−153	6
Seychelles	5	1	4	252	341	−89	6

18 February 2013
18:00

Botswana	19–105	Mozambique

18 February 2013
20:00

Zambia	76–52	Seychelles

19 February 2013
18:00

Mozambique	75–43	Zambia

19 February 2013
20:00

Seychelles	71–68	Botswana

20 February 2013
16:00

Zambia	86–40	Botswana

20 February 2013
18:00

Seychelles	39–71	Mozambique

22 February 2013
18:00

Mozambique	86–44	Botswana

22 February 2013
20:00

Seychelles	52–64	Zambia

23 February 2013

Zambia	38–78	Mozambique

23 February 2013

Botswana	62–38	Seychelles

24 February 2013

Botswana	0–0 (DNP)	Zambia

24 February 2013

Mozambique	0–0 (DNP)	Seychelles
