= Togo men's national basketball team =

Togo
- FIBA ranking: NR (1 September 2026)
- Joined FIBA: 1963
- FIBA zone: FIBA Africa
- National federation: Fédération Nationale de Basketball Togo (FTBB)
- Coach: Guy Arneaud

Olympic Games
- Appearances: None

FIBA World Cup
- Appearances: None

FIBA Africa Championship
- Appearances: 4
- Medals: None
Home	Away

The Togo national basketball team is the men's national basketball team representing Togo in international competition. In August 2010, the team qualified for the 2011 African Championship in Madagascar.

== Competitive performance ==
=== FIBA AfroBasket ===
Togo has made four appearances in the AfroBasket (formerly African Championship), its first being in 1972. Their best finish was their 6th place in 1974. After the country's third appearance in 1978, Togo was missing from the stage for 33 years, before returning at the 2011 edition.

AfroBasket record						Qualification record			
Year	Round	Position	GP	W	L	GP	W	L	–
(Morocco) 1964	Did not qualify								
(Tunisia) 1965	Did not qualify								
(Morocco) 1968	Did not qualify								
(Egypt) 1970	Did not qualify								
(Senegal) 1972	Classification stage	11th	6	1	5				
(Central African Republic) 1974	Classification stage	6th	6	4	2				
(Egypt) 1975	Did not qualify								
(Senegal) 1978	Classification stage	8th	5	1	4				
(Morocco) 1980	Did not qualify								
(Somalia) 1981	Did not qualify								
(Egypt) 1983	Did not qualify								
(Ivory Coast) 1985	Did not qualify								
(Tunisia) 1987	Did not qualify								
(Angola) 1989	Did not qualify								
(Egypt) 1992	Did not qualify								
(Kenya) 1993	Did not qualify								
(Algeria) 1995	Did not qualify								
(Senegal) 1997	Did not qualify								
(Angola) 1999	Did not qualify								
(Morocco) 2001	Did not qualify								
(Egypt) 2003	Did not qualify								
(Algeria) 2005	Did not qualify								
(Angola) 2007	Did not qualify								
(Libya) 2009	Did not qualify					4	0	4	2009
(Madagascar) 2011	Round of 16	16th	4	0	4	6	3	3	2011
(Ivory Coast) 2013	Did not qualify					2	1	1	2013
(Tunisia) 2015	Did not qualify					Did not enter			
(Tunisia) (Senegal) 2017	Did not qualify					Did not enter			
(Rwanda) 2021	Did not qualify					Did not enter			
(Angola) 2025	Did not qualify					Did not enter			
Total	4/29		21	6	15	10	4	6	–

== Current roster ==
At the AfroBasket 2013 qualification:

Togo men's national basketball team roster
Players
Coaches

Pos.	No.	Name	Age – Date of birth	Height	Club	Ctr.
C	4	Rachidi Soulemana	28 – 3 September 1983	2.02 m (6 ft 8 in)	Fighters Lomé	(Benin)
F	5	Fatarh Damtare	28 – 29 December 1983	1.95 m (6 ft 5 in)	Fighters Lomé	(Togo)
PG	9	Komi Ayayi	25 – 30 October 1986	1.79 m (5 ft 10 in)	Swallows Lomé	(Togo)
SG	8	Edem Pinheiro	31 – 14 April 1981	1.85 m (6 ft 1 in)	Swallows Lomé	(Togo)
F	10	Messan Kokou Doe-Bruce	25 – 2 July 1986	1.96 m (6 ft 5 in)	CO Modèle de Lomé	(Togo)
G	11	Komi Tinin Kouigan	27 – 4 August 1984	1.94 m (6 ft 4 in)	Racing Club Lomé	(Togo)
SG	12	Jimmy Williams	26 – 27 May 1986	1.96 m (6 ft 5 in)	Al-Wakrah Sport Club	(Qatar)
PF	14	Fofana Saibou	25 – 11 November 1986	2.00 m (6 ft 7 in)	Gombe Bulls	(Nigeria)
		Komla Mawunyo Banka	26 – 1 January 1986	1.98 m (6 ft 6 in)
		Yaovi Enenamede De Souza	34 – 6 October 1977
		Etteh Dittey	31 – 3 November 1980			(Togo)
		Assad John Kadi	26 – 30 May 1986			(Togo)

Head coach

Assistant coaches

Legend

- Club – describes last
  club before the tournament
- Age – describes age
  on 1 July 2012

== Head coach position ==
- (France) Guy Arneaud - 2011

== See also ==
- Togo women's national basketball team
- Samson Johnson
