= Yusuf Qaafow =

Somali basketball player (born 1987)

Personal information
- Born: June 19, 1987 (age 39) Mogadishu, Somalia
- Listed height: 6 ft 3 in (1.91 m)
- Listed weight: 192 lb (87 kg)

Career information
- NBA draft: 2009: undrafted
- Playing career: 2009–pending
- Position: Guard
- Number: 3

Career history
- 2009: Melbourne Tigers
- 2003 - 2012: Brisbane Spartans
- 2009 - 2015: Geelong Supercats
- 2013 - 2014: Bulleen Boomers
- 2014 - 2015: HumeCity Broncos
- 2015 - 2016: Brisbane Spartans

Yusuf Qaafow (born June 19, 1987) is a Somali professional basketball player. At a professional level, he played for the Melbourne Tigers and then the Brisbane Spartans from 2009 until 2017, and has since been a basketball coach running his own academy called the HardKnockz Academy. Yusuf was born in Mogadishu Somalia and moved to Australia where he began playing basketball at the age of 12. He opted to represent his country of birth, Somalia national basketball team where he was born in 1987. Yusuf played for Australian u19's School Boys team in New Zealand following year played in the Pacific School Games and then attended Junior College in Chicago and made 2nd team all conference and a freshman. Yusuf is the longest serving captain of the Somalia national basketball team 2013-2020, he has served as the nations longest team captain thus far. Qaafow aspires to one day to get Somalia to be recognised as a basketball powerhouse once the country becomes stable.
