= 2018 Arab Basketball Championship =

Basketball tournament

Tournament details
- Host country: Egypt
- City: Cairo
- Dates: 7-16 November
- Teams: 5 (from 2 confederations)
- Venue: 1 (in 1 host city)

Final positions
- Champions: Saudi Arabia (2nd title)
- Runners-up: Algeria
- Third place: Egypt
- Fourth place: Bahrain

2018 Arab Basketball Championship for Men was the 23rd edition of the Arab Basketball Championship, a men's basketball regional championship of Arab world that ended with Saudi Arabia being crowned winner. The tournament was hosted by Egypt for the ninth time and featured 5 teams.

== Participating teams ==
Africa

- Algeria
- Egypt (hosts)

Asia

- Bahrain
- Saudi Arabia
- United Arab Emirates

== Venues ==
Cairo	2018 Arab Basketball Championship is located in Egypt
Cairo Stadium Indoor Halls	2018 Arab Basketball Championship is located in Egypt
Capacity: 16,900	2018 Arab Basketball Championship is located in Egypt

== Preliminary round ==
Pos	Team	Pld	W	L	GF	GA	GD	Pts	Qualification
1	Egypt (H)	4	4	0	299	253	+46	8	Semi-finals
2	Bahrain	4	2	2	318	293	+25	6	Semi-finals
3	Algeria	4	2	2	304	322	−18	6	Semi-finals
4	Saudi Arabia	4	1	3	290	304	−14	5	Semi-finals
5	United Arab Emirates	4	1	3	286	325	−39	5	

Rules for classification: 1) Points; 2) Head-to-head results; 3) Points difference; 4) Points scored.
(H) Hosts

7 November 2018
--:--

Egypt	69–62	Algeria

Cairo Stadium Indoor Halls, Cairo

8 November 2018
--:--

Bahrain	75–68	Saudi Arabia

Cairo Stadium Indoor Halls, Cairo

8 November 2018
--:--

Algeria	84–69	United Arab Emirates

Cairo Stadium Indoor Halls, Cairo

9 November 2018
--:--

Saudi Arabia	85–90	Algeria

Cairo Stadium Indoor Halls, Cairo

9 November 2018
--:--

Egypt	82–69	United Arab Emirates

Cairo Stadium Indoor Halls, Cairo

10 November 2018
--:--

Egypt	74–64	Bahrain

Cairo Stadium Indoor Halls, Cairo

10 November 2018
--:--

United Arab Emirates	65–79	Saudi Arabia

Cairo Stadium Indoor Halls, Cairo

12 November 2018
--:--

Algeria	68–99	Bahrain

Cairo Stadium Indoor Halls, Cairo

12 November 2018
--:--

Saudi Arabia	58–74	Egypt

Cairo Stadium Indoor Halls, Cairo

13 November 2018
--:--

Bahrain	80–83	United Arab Emirates

Cairo Stadium Indoor Halls, Cairo

== Knockout stage ==
=== Bracket ===
Semi-finals
15 November
Algeria	74
Bahrain	66
15 November
Egypt	69
Saudi Arabia	70

Final
16 November
Algeria	81
Saudi Arabia	85
Third place
16 November
Bahrain	72
Egypt	84

=== Semi-finals ===
15 November 2018
--:--

Algeria	74–66	Bahrain

Cairo Stadium Indoor Halls, Cairo

15 November 2018
--:--

Egypt	69–70	Saudi Arabia

Cairo Stadium Indoor Halls, Cairo

=== Third place match ===
16 November 2018
--:--

Bahrain	72–84	Egypt

Cairo Stadium Indoor Halls, Cairo

=== Final ===
16 November 2018
--:--

Algeria	81–85	Saudi Arabia

Cairo Stadium Indoor Halls, Cairo

== Final standings ==
Rank	Team	Record
1st place, gold medalist(s)	Saudi Arabia	3–3
2nd place, silver medalist(s)	Algeria	3–3
3rd place, bronze medalist(s)	Egypt	5–1
4	Bahrain	2–4
5	United Arab Emirates	1–3
