= Burundi men's national basketball team =

Burundi
- FIBA ranking: 112 (3 March 2026)
- Joined FIBA: 1994
- FIBA zone: FIBA Africa
- National federation: Fédération de Basketball du Burundi

Olympic Games
- Appearances: None

FIBA World Cup
- Appearances: None

African Championship
- Appearances: None
Home	Away

The Burundi national basketball team represents Burundi in international competitions. It is administered by the Fédération de Basketball du Burundi.

Burundi joined FIBA in 1994 and is one of its youngest members. Unlike its neighbors DR Congo, Rwanda and Tanzania, the team has not yet succeeded to qualify for the FIBA Africa Championship.

== Current roster ==
Team for the 2013 Afrobasket Qualification:

Burundi men's national basketball team roster
Players
Coaches

Pos.	No.	Name	Age – Date of birth	Height	Club
		Cubahiro Sudi	–
		Régis Gatogato	–
		Guy Armel Habarugira	–
		Elvis Hakizimana	–
		Jean Hakizimana	–
		Roger Havyarimana	–
		Brian Irakoze Kavakure	–
		Désiré Mucu	–
		Auguste Ndayiragije	–
		Blaise Nikobahoze	–
		Jean de Dieu Ntagunduka	–
		Yves Nzeyimana	–
		Francis Sokoroza	–

Head coach

- [[]]

Legend

- Club – describes last
  club before the tournament
- Age – describes age
  on 19 August 2015

== Competitions ==
=== Performance at Summer Olympics ===
yet to qualify

=== Performance at World Championships ===
yet to qualify

=== Performance at FIBA Africa Championship ===
yet to qualify
