= Somalia men's national basketball team =

Somalia
- FIBA ranking: 134 ▼2 (1 September 2026)
- Joined FIBA: 1960
- FIBA zone: FIBA Africa
- National federation: Somali Basketball Federation
- Coach: Dalmar Ali

Olympic Games
- Appearances: None

FIBA World Cup
- Appearances: None

African Championship
- Appearances: 5
- Medals: Bronze: 1981
Home	Away

The Somalia national basketball team is the national basketball team of Somalia. It is a member of the International Basketball Federation (FIBA) and is governed by the Somali Basketball Federation.

== Administration ==
As of April 2014, Nur Mohamed Abdullahi serves as the president of the Somalia Basketball Federation. Sadak Abdulkadir is the Secretary General. The captain of the team is Yusu Qaafow.

== History ==
The Somalia Basketball Federation became affiliated with FIBA in 1960. It is part of the executive board of the Arab Basketball Confederation.

Although the national basketball squad has yet to pass the qualification stages of the FIBA World Championship, it won a bronze medal at the 1981 FIBA Africa Championship, when Somalia hosted the tournament. The team also participates in the basketball event at the Pan Arab Games.

== Roster ==
Somalia men's national basketball team roster
Players
Coaches

Pos.	No.	Name	Age – Date of birth	Height	Club
G	6	Munye Sufi	–	1.68 m (5 ft 6 in)		(Somalia)
F	7	Abdihakim dalmar	–	1.93 m (6 ft 4 in)		(Somalia)
F	8	Liban Hassan	–	1.98 m (6 ft 6 in)	MacEwan University	(Canada)
G	9	Yusuf Qaafow	–	1.90 m (6 ft 3 in)	Brisbane Spartans	(Australia)
G	10	Tabid Mohamed	–	1.60 m (5 ft 3 in)		(Somalia)
F	11	Abdi Faras	–	2.03 m (6 ft 8 in)	Cal State San Bernardino Coyotes	(United States)
G	12	Faisal Aden	? – 19 January 1989	1.93 m (6 ft 4 in)		(Somalia)
F	13	Os Mohamed	–	2.01 m (6 ft 7 in)		(Somalia)
F	14	Mohamed Ibrahim	–	1.96 m (6 ft 5 in)		(Somalia)
F	15	Osman Olol	? – 28 May 1988	2.05 m (6 ft 9 in)		(Somalia)

Head coach

- (Somalia) Omar Baajarab

Assistant coach(es)

- (Somalia) Bashir Fox
- (Somalia) Ahmed Mussa

Legend

- Club – describes last
  club before the tournament

Roster
Somali National Team at AfroBasket.com

== Competitive record ==
=== AfroBasket ===
Somalia has played in five AfroBasket tournaments, with its best result being the bronze medal in 1981 when the country hosted the tournament. Since 1985, Somalia has been absent from the tournament, although it has played in all qualifying rounds since 2015.

AfroBasket record						Qualification record			
Year	Round	Position	GP	W	L	GP	W	L	–
(United Arab Republic) 1962	Did not enter								
(Morocco) 1964	Did not enter								
(Tunisia) 1965	Did not enter								
(Morocco) 1968	Did not enter								
(Egypt) 1970	Preliminary round	7th	3	0	3				
(Senegal) 1972	Did not qualify								
(Central African Republic) 1974	Preliminary round	10th	6	0	6				
(Egypt) 1975	Did not qualify								
(Senegal) 1978	Did not qualify								
(Morocco) 1980	Preliminary round	9th	6	3	3				
(Somalia) 1981	Third place	3rd	6	5	1				
(Egypt) 1983	Preliminary round	8th	5	1	4				
(Ivory Coast) 1985	Did not qualify								
(Tunisia) 1987	Did not qualify								
(Angola) 1989	Did not qualify								
(Egypt) 1992	Did not qualify								
(Kenya) 1993	Did not qualify								
(Algeria) 1995	Did not qualify								
(Senegal) 1997	Did not qualify								
(Angola) 1999	Did not qualify								
(Morocco) 2001	Did not qualify								
(Egypt) 2003	Did not qualify								
(Algeria) 2005	Did not qualify								
(Angola) 2007	Did not qualify								
(Libya) 2009	Did not qualify					Did not enter			
(Madagascar) 2011	Did not qualify					Did not enter			
(Ivory Coast) 2013	Did not qualify					4	2	2	2013
(Tunisia) 2015	Did not qualify					4	0	4	2015
(Senegal) (Tunisia) 2017	Did not qualify					3	0	3	2017
(Rwanda) 2021	Did not qualify					5	2	3	2021
(Angola) 2025	Did not qualify					Did'not enter			2025
Total	5/31		26	9	17	16	4	12	–

=== African Games ===
- 1965-1978 : Did not qualify
- 1987 : ?
- 1991-2015 : Did not qualify
- 2019 : To be determined

=== Islamic Solidarity Games ===
- 2005 : 17th
- 2013 : Did not participate

== Past rosters ==
Team for AfroBasket 2013 qualification

Somalia men's national basketball team roster
Players
Coaches

Pos.	No.	Name	Age – Date of birth	Height	Club
G	6	Munye Sufi	–	1.68 m (5 ft 6 in)		(Somalia)
F	7	Abdihakim dalmar	–	1.93 m (6 ft 4 in)		(Somalia)
F	8	Liban Hassan	–	1.98 m (6 ft 6 in)	MacEwan University	(Canada)
G	9	Yusuf Qaafow	–	1.90 m (6 ft 3 in)	Brisbane Spartans	(Australia)
G	10	Tabid Mohamed	–	1.60 m (5 ft 3 in)		(Somalia)
F	11	Abdi Faras	–	2.03 m (6 ft 8 in)	Cal State San Bernardino Coyotes	(United States)
G	12	Faisal Aden	? – 19 January 1989	1.93 m (6 ft 4 in)	SC Rasta Vechta	(Germany)
F	13	Osman Mohamed	–	2.01 m (6 ft 7 in)		(Somalia)
F	14	Mohamed Ibrahim	–	1.96 m (6 ft 5 in)		(Somalia)
F	15	Osman Olol	? – 28 May 1988	2.05 m (6 ft 9 in)		(Somalia)

Head coach

- (Somalia) Omar Baajarab

Assistant coach(es)

- (Somalia) Bashir Fox
- (Somalia) Ahmed Mussa

Legend

- Club – describes last
  club before the tournament

Roster
Somali National Team at AfroBasket.com

Team for AfroBasket 2015 qualification

Somalia men's national basketball team roster
Players
Coaches

Pos.	No.	Name	Age – Date of birth	Height	Club
G	4	Osman Mohamed	–	1.68 m (5 ft 6 in)	Guelph University	(Canada)
F	5	Said Abu Sheikh	–	1.98 m (6 ft 6 in)	MacEwan University	(Somalia)
G	6	Tabid Mohamed	–	1.60 m (5 ft 3 in)	Seattle University	(United States)
F	7	Eman Ahmed	? – 28 May 1988	2.05 m (6 ft 9 in)	Algonquin College	(Canada)
F	14	Mohamed-Deeq Olow	–	1.96 m (6 ft 5 in)		(Somalia)
G	9	Yusuf Qaafow	–	1.90 m (6 ft 3 in)	Humi City	(Australia)
F	10	Mahdi Hussein	–	1.93 m (6 ft 4 in)	York University	(Canada)
F	11	Osman Olol	–	2.03 m (6 ft 8 in)	Coppin State University	(Canada)
G	12	Faisal Aden	? – 19 January 1989	1.93 m (6 ft 4 in)	SC Rasta Vechta	(Germany)
F	13	Koshin Diriye Mohamed	–	2.01 m (6 ft 7 in)		(Somalia)
F	14	Mahmud Ahmed	–	1.96 m (6 ft 5 in)		(Somalia)
F	15	Aden Ali	? – 28 May 1988	2.05 m (6 ft 9 in)		(Somalia)

Head coach

- (Somalia) Omar Baajarab

Assistant coach(es)

- (Somalia) Bashir Fox
- (Somalia) Ahmed Mussa

Legend

- Club – describes last
  club before the tournament

Roster

== See also ==
- Sports in Somalia
- Somalia national under-19 basketball team
- Somalia women's national basketball team
