= Romaric Kondzy =

Republic of the Congo basketball player

Romaric Kondzy (frère de styvel Faudey-massembo) (born 12 December 1980) is a Congolese basketball player who is a member of the Congo national basketball team.

Kondzy currently plays for InterClub Brazzaville of the Congo Basketball League. He was a member of the Congo national basketball team that finished sixteenth at the 2009 FIBA Africa Championship and finished third in the competition in steals, averaging 2.3 SPG.
