= Cameroon men's national basketball team =

Basketball team representing Cameroon

Cameroon
- FIBA ranking: 55 ▲3 (1 September 2026)
- Joined FIBA: 1965
- FIBA zone: FIBA Africa
- National federation: Cameroon Basketball Federation
- Coach: Alfred Aboya
- Nickname: Indomitable Lions

AfroBasket
- Appearances: 11
- Medals: Silver: (2007)
Home	Away

The Cameroon national basketball team (French: Équipe nationale de basketball de Camerounaise) represents Cameroon in men's international competitions. It is administered by the Fédération Camerounaise de Basketball.

Once an only average team, Cameroon has turned into a major force and contender for the title of the African Basketball Championship. Their best achievement was reaching the Silver Medal in 2007. Since the late 2000s, the team has competed well against non-African competition, too.

Paris Lee became a naturalised Cameroonian citizen in 2022. On August 26, he made his debut fort he team in a 71–69 win over the DR Congo during the 2023 FIBA Basketball World Cup African Qualifiers, scoring 15 points as the starting point guard.

At the FIBA AfroBasket 2025, Cameroon reached the semifinals for a third time and finished fourth again. Yves Missi featured for the team, becoming the first active NBA player to represent the country since Luc Mbah a Moute in 2013.

== Competitive record ==
=== World Cup ===
Since 2019, FIBA organises qualification tournaments for African teams in order to qualify for the FIBA Basketball World Cup.

FIBA Basketball World Cup record						Qualification record		
Year	Round	Position	GP	W	L	GP	W	L
(China) 2019	did not qualify					12	7	5
(Philippines) (Japan) (Indonesia) 2023	did not qualify					12	4	8
(Qatar) 2027	to be determined					In progress		
(France) 2031	to be determined					To be determined		
Total						24	11	13

=== AfroBasket ===
Year	Round	Position	GP	W	L
(Morocco) 1968	did not qualify				
(Egypt) 1970	did not qualify				
(Senegal) 1972	Eight place	8th	6	2	4
(Central African Republic) 1974	Fourth place	4th	5	2	3
(Egypt) 1975	did not qualify				
(Senegal) 1978	did not qualify				
(Morocco) 1980	did not qualify				
(Somalia) 1981	did not qualify				
(Egypt) 1983	did not qualify				
(Ivory Coast) 1985	did not qualify				
(Tunisia) 1987	did not qualify				
(Angola) 1989	did not qualify				
(Egypt) 1992	Classification stage	8th	6	2	4
(Kenya) 1993	did not qualify				
(Algeria) 1995	did not qualify				
(Senegal) 1997	did not qualify				
(Angola) 1999	did not qualify				
(Morocco) 2001	did not qualify				
(Egypt) 2003	did not qualify				
(Algeria) 2005	did not qualify				
(Angola) 2007	Runners-up	2nd	6	5	1
(Libya) 2009	Fourth place	4th	9	4	5
(Madagascar) 2011	Quarterfinals	8th	7	5	2
(Ivory Coast) 2013	Quarterfinals	5th	7	5	2
(Tunisia) 2015	Round of 16	9th	5	3	2
(Senegal) (Tunisia) 2017	Quarterfinals	5th	4	2	2
(Rwanda) 2021	Group stage	16th	3	0	3
(Angola) 2025	Fourth place	4th	7	4	3
Total	11 appearances		65	34	31

=== AfroCan ===
Year	Round	Position	GP	W	L
(Mali) 2019	Did not qualify				
(Angola) 2023	11th place	11th	3	0	3
(Rwanda) 2027	To be determined				
Total	1/3		3	0	3

== Team ==
=== Current roster ===
Roster for the AfroBasket 2025.

Cameroon men's national basketball team roster
Players
Coaches

Pos.	No.	Name	Age – Date of birth	Height	Club	Ctr.
PF	00	Paul Eboua	25 – 15 February 2000	2.03 m (6 ft 8 in)	Trapani Shark	(Italy)
SG	4	Valentin Lele	21 – 12 May 2004	1.88 m (6 ft 2 in)	BEAC Basketball	(Cameroon)
C	5	Amadou Sieni	18 – 5 January 2007	2.16 m (7 ft 1 in)	Varese Academy	(Italy)
F	7	Tamenang Choh	27 – 17 July 1998	1.98 m (6 ft 6 in)	VfL AstroStars Bochum	(Germany)
PG	8	Samir Gbetkom	27 – 24 March 1998	1.91 m (6 ft 3 in)	Antibes Sharks	(France)
F	11	Brice Eyaga	26 – 26 November 1998	2.05 m (6 ft 9 in)	JA Vichy Basket	(France)
PF	21	Yves Missi	21 – 14 May 2004	2.08 m (6 ft 10 in)	New Orleans Pelicans	(United States)
SG	23	Fabien Ateba (C)	34 – 30 May 1991	1.95 m (6 ft 5 in)	Union Tarbes-Lourdes	(France)
F	25	Roger Moute a Bidias	30 – 22 April 1995	1.99 m (6 ft 6 in)	CB Lucentum Alicante	(Spain)
F	26	Jordan Bayehe	25 – 16 October 1999	2.06 m (6 ft 9 in)	Dolomiti Energia Trento	(Italy)
PF	44	Williams Narace	28 – 17 March 1997	2.03 m (6 ft 8 in)	Le Mans Sarthe	(France)
SG	68	Jeremiah Hill	29 – 4 September 1995	1.88 m (6 ft 2 in)	Élan Chalon	(France)

Head coach

- (Cameroon) Alfred Aboya

Assistant coach(es)

- (Spain) Mikel Ereño

Legend

- (C) Team captain
- Club – describes last
  club before the tournament
- Age – describes age
  on 12 August 2025

=== Head coach position ===
- (Cameroon) Lazare Adingono: (2007–2011)
- (France) (Switzerland) Michel Perrin: (2013)
- (Cameroon) Lazare Adingono: (2021–)
- (Cameroon) Alfred Roland Aboya Baliaba (2021–present)

=== Notable Cameroonian players ===
The following notable Cameroonian players are also eligible to represent the country in FIBA competitions:

- Christian Koloko (born 2000, C) – Player for the Toronto Raptors.
- Yves Missi (born 2004, C) – Player for the New Orleans Pelicans.
- Pascal Siakam (born 1994, F) – Player for the Indiana Pacers.
- Ulrich Chomche (born 2005, C) - Player for the Toronto Raptors

== See also ==
- Cameroon women's national basketball team
