= Mathieu Faye =

Senegalese basketball player

Personal information
- Born: 24 or 27 July 1958 (age 68) Dakar, French West Africa (now Senegal)
- Listed height: 1.92 m (6 ft 4 in)
- Listed weight: 82 kg (181 lb)

Career information
- Playing career: 1972–1989
- Position: Point guard

Career history
- 1972–1982: Jeanne d'Arc
- 1982–1983: Limoges
- 1983–1986: Racing Club de France
- 1986–1988: ABC Nantes
- 1988–1989: BCM Gravelines

Career highlights
- FIBA Korać Cup champion (1983); French League champion (1983); French Cup champion (1983)
- FIBA Hall of Fame

Mathieu Faye (born 24 or 27 July 1958) is a Senegalese former basketball player. Faye competed for Senegal at the 1980 Summer Olympics, where he scored 57 points in 6 games. He was born in Dakar. He won the 1983 Korać Cup with France's CSP Limoges basketball team.

On 6 June 2021, Faye was enshrined into the FIBA Basketball Hall of Fame.
