= Fabien Ateba =

French-Cameroonian basketball player

Saint-Vallier
- Position: Shooting guard
- League: French League

Personal information
- Born: May 30, 1991 (age 35) Argenteuil, France
- Listed height: 1.92 m (6 ft 4 in)

Career information
- Playing career: 2011–present

Career history
- 2011–2012: Hyères-Toulon Var Basket
- 2012–2013: Rouen Métropole Basket
- 2013–2014: Provence Basket
- 2014–2015: Hyères-Toulon Var Basket
- 2015–2016: Caen
- 2016–2017: Souffelweyersheim
- 2017–2018: Orchies
- 2018–2022: Tours
- 2022–present: Saint-Vallier

Fabien Quentin Philibert Ateba (born May 30, 1991) is a French-Cameroonian basketball player who plays for the French Pro B league club Saint-Vallier. He plays for the Cameroon national team, his first selection for his country was in August 2022.
