= DR Congo men's national basketball team =

Democratic Republic of the Congo
- FIBA ranking: 73 ▲3 (3 March 2026)
- Joined FIBA: 1963
- FIBA zone: FIBA Africa
- National federation: Febaco
- Coach: Michel Perrin
- Nickname: Leopards

AfroBasket
- Appearances: 8
Home	Away

The DR Congo national basketball team (French: Équipe nationale de basketball de Congo DR) represents DR Congo in men's international basketball competitions, it is controlled by the Basketball Federation of Democratic Republic of Congo. (French: République démocratique du Congo Fédération de basket-ball)

The team has appeared in the FIBA Africa Championship, but has yet to appear in the FIBA World Championship. Its biggest success to date was the Final Four placement at the 1975 FIBA Africa Championship when it competed as Zaire.

== History ==
DR Congo joined FIBA in 1963 and made its continental debut twelve years later at the AfroBasket in 1974. The following year, at AfroBasket 1975, the team—then known as Zaire—finished in fourth place with a 2–3 record. After placing sixth in 1980, DR Congo missed the tournament for the next 27 years.

At AfroBasket 2007, DR Congo returned and finished 15th.

Following another lengthy absence, DR Congo re-emerged at AfroBasket 2017 and advanced to the quarter-finals, highlighted by an upset of Nigeria in the group phase.

In August 2022, Jonathan Kuminga, then a newly crowned NBA champion with the Golden State Warriors, joined the national team for the 2023 FIBA World Cup African Qualifiers, becoming the first NBA player to represent the Leopards. He scored a team-high 18 points and six rebounds in a qualifier against Cameroon.

In qualifying for AfroBasket 2025, DR Congo impressed with a 5–1 record under head coach Michel Perrin. Expectations grew further when Kuminga was named to the preliminary roster.

However, as the tournament approached, Kuminga’s participation was cast into doubt due to unresolved contract negotiations with Golden State. He reportedly declined a two-year, $45 million extension and was considered unlikely to play for DR Congo at AfroBasket 2025.

== Performances ==
=== FIBA Basketball World Cup ===
DR Congo has never appeared in the FIBA Basketball World Cup, but has played in the qualifying rounds.

FIBA World Cup record						Qualification record			
Year	Round	Position	GP	W	L	GP	W	L	–
(Brazil) 1963	Did not qualify					AfroBasket served as qualification			
(Uruguay) 1967	Did not qualify					AfroBasket served as qualification			
(Socialist Federal Republic of Yugoslavia) 1970	Did not qualify					AfroBasket served as qualification			
(Puerto Rico) 1974	Did not qualify					AfroBasket served as qualification			
(Philippines) 1978	Did not qualify					AfroBasket served as qualification			
(Colombia) 1982	Did not qualify					AfroBasket served as qualification			
(Spain) 1986	Did not qualify					AfroBasket served as qualification			
(Argentina) 1990	Did not qualify					AfroBasket served as qualification			
(Canada) 1994	Did not qualify					AfroBasket served as qualification			
(Greece) 1998	Did not qualify					AfroBasket served as qualification			
(United States) 2002	Did not qualify					AfroBasket served as qualification			
(Japan) 2006	Did not qualify					AfroBasket served as qualification			
(Turkey) 2010	Did not qualify					AfroBasket served as qualification			
(Spain) 2014	Did not qualify					AfroBasket served as qualification			
(China) 2019	Did not qualify					6	2	4	2019
(Philippines) (Japan) (Indonesia) 2023	Did not qualify					12	5	7	2023
(Qatar) 2027	To be determined					In progress			2027
(France) 2031	To be determined					To be determined			
Total	0/16		0	0	0	18	7	11	Total

=== AfroBasket ===
Fourth place

AfroBasket record						Qualification record			
Year	Round	Position	GP	W	L	GP	W	L	–
(Morocco) 1964	Did not qualify								
(Tunisia) 1965	Did not qualify								
(Morocco) 1968	Did not qualify								
(Egypt) 1970	Did not qualify								
(Senegal) 1972	Did not qualify								
(Central African Republic) 1974	Classification stage	6th	4	1	3				
(Egypt) 1975	Main stage	4th	5	2	3				
(Senegal) 1978	Did not qualify								
(Morocco) 1980	Classification stage	6th	5	2	3				
(Somalia) 1981	Did not qualify								
(Egypt) 1983	Did not qualify								
(Ivory Coast) 1985	Did not qualify								
(Tunisia) 1987	Did not qualify								
(Angola) 1989	Did not qualify								
(Egypt) 1992	Did not qualify								
(Kenya) 1993	Did not qualify								
(Algeria) 1995	Did not qualify								
(Senegal) 1997	Did not qualify								
(Angola) 1999	Did not qualify								
(Morocco) 2001	Did not qualify								
(Egypt) 2003	Did not qualify								
(Algeria) 2005	Did not qualify								
(Angola) 2007	Classification round	15th	6	2	4				
(Libya) 2009	Did not qualify					4	1	3	2009
(Madagascar) 2011	Did not qualify					Did not enter			
(Ivory Coast) 2013	Did not qualify					6	1	5	2013
(Tunisia) 2015	Did not qualify					Withdrew			
(Senegal) (Tunisia) 2017	Quarter-finals	6th	4	2	2	2	1	1	2017
(Rwanda) 2021	Group stage	13th	3	1	2	6	3	3	2021
(Angola) 2025	Qualification to quarter-finals	11th	4	1	3	6	5	1	2025
Total	7/29		31	11	20	24	11	13	–

=== FIBA AfroCan ===
Champions Fourth place

Year	Round	Position	GP	W	L
(Mali) 2019	Champions	1st	5	5	0
(Angola) 2023	4th place	4th	6	3	2
(Rwanda) 2027	Qualified				
Total	3/3		11	8	2

== Team ==
=== Current roster ===
Roster for the 2025 FIBA AfroBasket.

DR Congo national basketball team roster
Players
Coaches

Pos.	No.	Name	Age – Date of birth	Height	Club	Ctr.
G	1	John Jordan	32 – 7 October 1992	1.80 m (5 ft 11 in)	FUS Rabat	(Morocco)
PG	7	Maxi Munanga Shamba	31 – 25 December 1993	1.90 m (6 ft 3 in)	US Maubeuge	(France)
F	11	Franck Nyembo	19 – 29 May 2006	2.00 m (6 ft 7 in)	Chaux Sport	(Democratic Republic of the Congo)
F	15	Rolly Fula Nganga (C)	32 – 2 February 1993	2.01 m (6 ft 7 in)	Val de Seine Basket	(France)
C	18	Jordan Sakho	28 – 4 April 1997	2.09 m (6 ft 10 in)	CB Breogán	(Spain)
F	20	Isaac Ngoy Mushila	26 – 17 February 1999	1.96 m (6 ft 5 in)	Córdoba CB	(Spain)
PF	21	Evariste Shonganya	34 – 6 April 1991	2.04 m (6 ft 8 in)	Val de Seine Basket	(France)
SG	24	Christian Lutete	28 – 9 October 1996	1.96 m (6 ft 5 in)	KK Bosna Royal	(Bosnia and Herzegovina)
SF	31	Christian Eyenga	36 – 22 June 1989	2.04 m (6 ft 8 in)
PF	33	Mervedi Kasekelayi Miteo	16 – 13 December 2008	2.08 m (6 ft 10 in)	AD Pedro Alvarez	(Spain)
C	34	Garmine Kande	25 – 24 August 1999	2.05 m (6 ft 9 in)	CD Estela	(Spain)
F	55	Djack Kapongo Kabuya	32 – 15 February 1993	1.96 m (6 ft 5 in)	Chaux Sport	(Democratic Republic of the Congo)

Head coach

- (France) Michel Perrin

Assistant coach(es)

- (France) Gaëtan Douet
- (Democratic Republic of the Congo) Muamba Ilunga

Legend

- (C) Team captain
- Club – describes last
  club before the tournament
- Age – describes age
  on 12 August 2025

=== Head coaches ===
Name	Nationality	Tenure
Jacques Ndala	DR Congo	2010s
Kouadio Michel	CIV	2010s
Philipp Onguéné	FRA	2016–2017
Papy Kipunka	DR Congo	2017–2018
John Douaglin	France	2018
Mathias Eckhoff	Norway	2020–2022
Thomas Drouot	France	February 2022 – July 2022
Emmanuel Mavomo	DR Congo	August 2022 – May 2023
Pierrot Ilunga	DR Congo	2023
Michel Perrin	France	2025

=== Notable eligible players ===
Name	Team	Team nation
Bismack Biyombo	San Antonio Spurs	United States
Jonathan Kuminga	Golden State Warriors	United States
Oscar Tshiebwe	Salt Lake City Stars	United States
Yannick Nzosa	Unicaja Málaga → Fuenlabrada	Spain
Jordan Sakho	Breogán	Spain
Emmanuel Mudiay	Piratas de Quebradillas	Puerto Rico

=== Past rosters ===
Roster in the 2023 FIBA World Cup qualifiers of August 27, 2022.

No.	Pos.	Player	Current club
00	SG	Jonathan Kuminga	(United States) Golden State Warriors
3	F	Narcisse Ambanza	(Democratic Republic of the Congo) Espoir Fukash
4	G	Myck Kabongo	(South Africa) Cape Town Tigers
5	G	Henry Pwono	(Luxembourg) Etzella
10	PF	Joel Ntambwe	(United States) Delaware Blue Coats
11	C	Pitchou Kambuy Manga	(Rwanda) REG
15	F	Rolly Fula Nganga	(Democratic Republic of the Congo) Espoir Fukash
16	PF	Shekinah Munanga	(France) Évreux
18	C	Jordan likanda	(Spain) CB Breogán
23	F	Rodrigue Ebondo Tambwe	(Ivory Coast) SOA
24	G	Ron Mvouika	(United Kingdom) Plymouth Raiders

== Top scorers ==
The following players were the DR Congo's top scorers in their AfroBasket tournaments:

DR Congo top scorers at AfroBasket
Tournament	Player	Points	PPG
2017	Herve Kabasele Kasonga	59	14.8
2021	Henry Pwono	48	16.0

== See also ==
- Basketball Federation of the Democratic Republic of the Congo
- Dikembe Mutombo
- Christian Eyenga
- Bismack Biyombo
- DR Congo women's national basketball team
- DR Congo men's national under-18 basketball team
- DR Congo men's national under-16 basketball team
