= Guinea men's national basketball team =

Guinea
- FIBA ranking: 67 ▲4 (1 September 2026)
- Joined FIBA: 1962
- FIBA zone: FIBA Africa
- National federation: Fédération Guinéenne de Basket-Ball (FeGuiBasket)
- Coach: Nedeljko Ašćerić
- Nickname(s): Syli nationale (National Elephants)

AfroBasket
- Appearances: 7
light	dark

The Guinea national basketball team represents Guinea in international basketball competitions. It is administered by the Fédération Guinéenne de Basket-Ball (FGBB).

Guinea has played at the AfroBasket six times, with its best performance being a fourth place in 1962.

== History ==
=== Establishment as an African pioneer (1962) ===
Guinea was one of five countries that participated at the African Championship 1962 in Cairo, Egypt. Guinea's fourth place finish there remains its best result at the AfroBasket.

=== Three Afrobasket qualifications in 50 years (1964–2015) ===
After the inauguration tournament, Guinea almost completely disappeared from the Afrobasket. The only exception was the time 1980–1985 where the team qualified for the Afrobasket on 3 out of 4 occasions.

=== Cedric Mansare becomes the leading player (2017–2020) ===
For the AfroBasket 2017 qualification, Cedric Mansare made his debut for the team. The 35-year-old guard has become the go-to player for Guinea ever since. After a surprising Qualifiers campaign, in which they beat former champion and medal contender Senegal, Guinea finished the regional play-off tied with Mali (3–3) in second place, but the Guineans fell short of automatic qualification for the Final Round due to a lower goal-average. Senegal and Mali secured automatic, Cape Verde was eliminated, but Guinea was awarded a wild card – along with Rwanda. The FIBA AfroBasket 2017 marked Guinea's first appearance in the tournament in more than 32 years.

=== Unexpected success (2021) ===
At the AfroBasket 2021 qualification, with Guinea needing to beat Equatorial Guinea in the final day of the Qualifiers, Cedric Mansare made four of his eight three-pointers attempts to finish with a team-high 18 points in the 80–71 victory. Throughout the campaign, Mansare averaged 11.5 points per game. Joining Mansare as Guinea central players, were power forward Ousmane Dramé, who contributed 8.2 rebounds in six games, and guard Ahmed Doumbia. Ahmed Doumbia only played the last three games of the Qualifiers, but he was immense for Guinea, averaging 13 points and 5.7 assists. With Guinea on the brink of elimination, Doumbia explained why he didn't want to miss such opportunity. "We want to bring our flag to the AfroBasket, putting our country on the basketball map. This is my main motivation."

=== Željko Zečević takes over (2021–present) ===
In 2021, the team qualified again. This was accomplished under the Serbian head coach Željko Zečević who replaced Frenchman Michel Perrin at the helm ahead of the decisive last window of the Qualifiers in February 2021. As of 2021, Zečević had coaching experience not only as head coach of Egypt at the AfroBasket 2009 but he had also managed a number of African clubs. Some of his coaching highlights in African included a Second-Place in the 2019 FIBA AfroLeague at the helm of Morocco's AS Sale. Zečević had further led US Monastir to the Third-Place of the 2017 FIBA Africa Clubs Champions Cup.

At the AfroBasket 2021 in Kigali, Guinea was drawn in Group B alongside Central African Republic, Egypt and Tunisia, which are three former AfroBasket champions. Guinea entered as the lowest-ranked of the 16-team AfroBasket 2021 line-up. Yet, they finished 8th out of 16, Guinea's best placement in almost 60 years.

== Performance at AfroBasket ==
Guinea has played at the AfroBasket (formerly the FIBA Africa Championship) six times, with its first appearance during the inaugural season in 1962. Its first appearance was its best one as the team finished in fourth place. After 18 years of absence, Guinea returned to the tournament in 1980 and later played in the 1983 and 1985 editions. After another 22 years of absence, the team returned in 2017. In the 2021 tournament, which Guinea qualified for through a wild card, they reached the quarter-finals for the first time.

Fourth place

AfroBasket record						Qualification record			
Year	Round	Position	GP	W	L	GP	W	L	–
(United Arab Republic) 1962	Main stage	4th	4	1	3				
(Morocco) 1964	Did not qualify								
(Tunisia) 1965	Did not qualify								
(Morocco) 1968	Did not qualify								
(Egypt) 1970	Did not qualify								
(Senegal) 1972	Did not qualify								
(Central African Republic) 1974	Did not qualify								
(Egypt) 1975	Did not qualify								
(Senegal) 1978	Did not qualify								
(Morocco) 1980	Classification stage	10th	5	0	5				
(Somalia) 1981	Did not qualify								
(Egypt) 1983	Classification stage	10th	5	0	5				
(Ivory Coast) 1985	Classification stage	11th	6	1	5				
(Tunisia) 1987	Did not qualify								
(Angola) 1989	Did not qualify								
(Egypt) 1992	Did not qualify								
(Kenya) 1993	Did not qualify								
(Algeria) 1995	Did not qualify								
(Senegal) 1997	Did not qualify								
(Angola) 1999	Did not qualify								
(Morocco) 2001	Did not qualify								
(Egypt) 2003	Did not qualify								
(Algeria) 2005	Did not qualify								
(Angola) 2007	Did not qualify								
(Libya) 2009	Did not qualify					Did not enter			
(Madagascar) 2011	Did not qualify					Did not enter			
(Ivory Coast) 2013	Did not qualify					Did not enter			
(Tunisia) 2015	Did not qualify					2	0	2	2015
(Tunisia) (Senegal) 2017	Preliminary round	16th	3	0	3	6 (Note: Guinea received a wild card for the AfroBasket 2017.)	3	3	2017
(Rwanda) 2021	Quarter-finals	8th	5	2	3	6	1	5	2021
(Angola) 2025	Qualification to quarter-finals	9th	4	2	2	6	2	4	2025
Total	7/31		32	6	26	25	18	7	–

== Performance at AfroCan ==
Fourth place

AfroCan record
(Mali) 2019	12th place	12th	3	0	3
(Angola) 2023	Did not qualify				
(Rwanda) 2027	To be determined				
Total	1/3		3	0	3

== Team ==
=== Current roster ===
Roster for the AfroBasket 2025.

Guinea men's national basketball team roster
Players
Coaches

Pos.	No.	Name	Age – Date of birth	Height	Club	Ctr.
PG	0	Souley Boum	26 – 26 January 1999	1.91 m (6 ft 3 in)	MKS Dąbrowa Górnicza	(Poland)
PG	1	Ahmed Doumbia	35 – 19 August 1989	1.95 m (6 ft 5 in)	Rivers Hoopers	(Nigeria)
SF	3	Ousmane Kaba	23 – 17 January 2002	1.91 m (6 ft 3 in)	Poissy Basket	(France)
F	5	Sekou Sylla	25 – 31 March 2000	1.95 m (6 ft 5 in)	KK Skupi	(North Macedonia)
F	11	Alpha Diallo	28 – 29 June 1997	2.01 m (6 ft 7 in)	AS Monaco Basket	(France)
SG	12	Nour Gassim Toure	16 – 23 October 2008	1.94 m (6 ft 4 in)	Principia	(United States)
PF	13	Tidjan Keita	28 – 30 November 1996	2.05 m (6 ft 9 in)	CB Tizona	(Spain)
PF	14	Ousmane Drame	33 – 15 December 1991	2.04 m (6 ft 8 in)	Start Lublin	(Poland)
SG	21	Ibrahima Doumbouya	27 – 7 October 1997	1.98 m (6 ft 6 in)	Calgary Surge	(Canada)
PF	23	Cheick Condé	33 – 20 June 1992	2.04 m (6 ft 8 in)	Union Rennes 35	(France)
C	25	Mamadi Diakite	28 – 21 January 1997	2.06 m (6 ft 9 in)	Valley Suns	(United States)
PF	35	Mohamed Queta	30 – 1 May 1995	2.04 m (6 ft 8 in)	Union Tarbes-Lourdes	(France)

Head coach

- (Austria) Nedeljko Ašćerić

Assistant coach(es)

- (Senegal) Souleymane Camara

Legend

- (C) Team captain
- Club – describes last
  club before the tournament
- Age – describes age
  on 12 August 2025

=== Notable players ===
Guinea men's national basketball team roster
Players
Coaches

Pos.	No.	Name	Age – Date of birth	Height	Club	Ctr.
C		Moussa Cisse	23 – 10 September 2002	2.11 m (6 ft 11 in)	Dallas Mavericks	(United States)
PF		Mamadi Diakite	28 – 21 January 1997	2.06 m (6 ft 9 in)	Baskonia	(Spain)
SF		Alpha Diallo	28 – 29 June 1997	2.01 m (6 ft 7 in)	AS Monaco Basket	(France)
SF		Abdouramane Toure	18 – 14 August 2007	1.95 m (6 ft 5 in)	[[Notre Dame High School]]	(United States)
PG		Souley Boum	26 – 26 January 1999	1.90 m (6 ft 3 in)	BC Vienna	(Austria)

Head coach

- (Austria) Nedeljko Ašćerić

Assistant coach(es)

- (Senegal) Souleymane Camara

Legend

- (C) Team captain
- Club – describes last
  club before the tournament
- Age – describes age
  on 1 January 2026

=== Past rosters ===
Roster for the AfroBasket 2017.

Guinea men's national basketball team roster
Players
Coaches

Pos.	No.	Name	Age – Date of birth	Height	Club	Ctr.
PG	4	Malick Kone	25 – 12 December 1991	1.95 m (6 ft 5 in)	Rutgers Scarlet Knights men's basketball	(United States)
SG	5	Abdoulaye Sy	22 – 14 April 1995	1.98 m (6 ft 6 in)	Stade Marseillais UC	(France)
SG	6	Yamoussa Kolontin Camara	21 – 5 December 1995	1.98 m (6 ft 6 in)
F	7	Mohamed Beka Youla	29 – 17 September 1987	2.02 m (6 ft 8 in)
PG	8	Yacouba Sylla	28 – 28 May 1989	1.85 m (6 ft 1 in)	BBC Nyon	(Switzerland)
PF	9	Mohamed Souare	25 – 12 July 1992	1.98 m (6 ft 6 in)	Meyrin Basket Geneve	(Switzerland)
SG	10	Cedric Mansare	31 – 18 October 1985	1.98 m (6 ft 6 in)	Feurs Enfants du Forez	(France)
F	11	Ismael Conde	25 – 7 May 1992	2.01 m (6 ft 7 in)
PF	12	Cheick Sekou Conde	25 – 20 June 1992	2.04 m (6 ft 8 in)	CB Morón	(Spain)
C	13	Alfa Ntiallo	24 – 13 October 1992	2.10 m (6 ft 11 in)	Union Kavala B.C.	(Greece)
PF	14	Daouda Vinson Conde	25 – 10 June 1992	2.10 m (6 ft 11 in)
PF	15	Bachir Bella Diallo	24 – 3 May 1993	1.95 m (6 ft 5 in)

Head coach

- (Guinea) Ousmane Tafsir Camara

Assistant coaches

- (Guinea) Ansoumane Toure

Legend

- Club – describes last
  club before the tournament
- Age – describes age
  on 6 September 2017

At the 2015 Afrobasket qualification:

Guinea men's national basketball team roster
Players
Coaches

Pos.	No.	Name	Age – Date of birth	Height	Club	Ctr.
		Ibrahima Laho Barry	22 – 8 June 1993
		Donacien Camara	22 – 24 May 1993
		Yamoussa Kolontin Camara	19 – 5 December 1995			(Liberia)
		Georges Mahatma Gandhi Conde	25 – 9 January 1990
		Bachir Bella Diallo	22 – 3 May 1993
		Yoro Diallo	17 – 21 December 1997			(Guinea)
		Mamady Diane	20 – 28 February 1995
		Mamadi Keita	27 – 10 March 1988
		Ousmane Niang	32 – 2 December 1982
		Mohamed Nassirou Sankhon	18 – 15 June 1997
		Ibrahima Sidibe	22 – 31 March 1993			(Guinea)
		Ousmane Soumah	19 – 16 October 1995			(Guinea)
		Abdoulaye Sy	20 – 14 April 1995
		Naby Youssouf Sylla	22 – 3 April 1993
		Yacouba Sylla	26 – 28 May 1989
		Younoussa Toure	29 – 2 December 1985
		Mohamed Lamine Traore	19 – 1 December 1995
		Beka Youla Mohamed	27 – 17 September 1987			(Guinea)

Head coach

- (Portugal) Jose Abrantes

Assistant coaches

Legend

- Club – describes last
  club before the tournament
- Age – describes age
  on 19 August 2015

== Kit ==
2015 – Adidas
