= Malawi men's national basketball team =

Malawi
- FIBA ranking: NR (1 September 2026)
- Joined FIBA: 1988
- FIBA zone: FIBA Africa
- National federation: Basketball Association of Malawi-BASMAL

Olympic Games
- Appearances: None

FIBA World Cup
- Appearances: None

African Championship
- Appearances: None
Home	Away

The Malawi national basketball team represents Malawi in international competitions. It is administered by the Basketball Association of Malawi-BASMAL.

Founded in 1988, Team Malawi is one of FIBA's members. It has attempted to qualify for the African Basketball Championship several times but waits for its breakthrough.

== Roster ==
Team for the AfroBasket 2011 qualification.

Malawi men's national basketball team roster
Players
Coaches

Pos.	No.	Name	Age – Date of birth	Height	Club
	4	Hope Happy Corrado Chisamanga	33 – 30 June 1978		Zomba Magang'a	(Malawi)
		Nelson Chakalipa Jnr Kanyenda	25 – 29 October 1985		Nkhulande	(Malawi)
		Geoffrey Kumwenda	22 – 1 August 1989		ABC Lions	(Malawi)
		Takondwa Elias Mengezi	23 – 13 December 1987		Cougars Sports Club	(Malawi)
	9	Mwasoni Phiri	36 – 15 October 1974
		Henry Bentry Mwalwanda	26 – 10 April 1985		ABC Lions	(Malawi)
		Vincent Junior Ngosi	24 – 16 December 1986		Malawi Basketball Warriors	(Malawi)
		Mtende Adamson Nzunda	28 – 3 August 1983		Ndola Blazers	(Zambia)
	12	Chimwemwe Macmin Mulaga	34 – 26 March 1977		Ndola Blazers	(Zambia)
		Albert Chikumbutso Simango	26 – 23 March 1985
		Mphatso Zilemba	24 – 20 December 1986		Mimbulu Lilongwe	(Malawi)
G	15	Richard Chavula	27 – 6 August 1984	6 ft 0 in (1.83 m)	Bricks	(Malawi)

Head coach

(United States) Mike Fluech

- ?

Legend

- Club – describes last
  club before the tournament
- Age – describes age
  on 17 August 2011

== Competitions ==
=== Performance at Summer Olympics ===
yet to qualify

=== Performance at World championships ===
yet to qualify

=== Performance at FIBA Africa Championship ===
yet to qualify

== See also ==
- Malawi women's national basketball team
- Malawi national under-19 basketball team
