= FIBA Africa Championship 1980 =

1980 FIBA AfroBasket
10th FIBA African Basketball Championship

Tournament details
- Host country: Morocco
- Dates: March 22-30
- Teams: 11 (from 39 federations)
- Venue: 1 (in 1 host city)

Final positions
- Champions: Senegal (4th title)

Tournament statistics
- MVP: (Senegal) Mathieu Faye

The FIBA Africa Championship 1980 was hosted by Morocco from March 20 to March 28, 1980. The games were played in Rabat. Senegal won the tournament, its fourth African Championship, by beating Cote d'Ivoire in the final. Senegal qualified for the 1980 Summer Olympics as a result of its showing in this tournament.

== Competing nations ==
The following national teams competed:

Group A	Group B
Angola; Ivory Coast; Guinea; Morocco; Zaire	Algeria; Congo; Mauritania; Nigeria; Senegal; Somalia

== Preliminary rounds ==
=== Group A ===
Team	Pts	Pld	W	L	PF	PA	Diff
Ivory Coast	8	4	4	0	426	318	+108
Morocco	7	4	3	1	344	341	+3
Zaire	6	4	2	2	331	313	+18
Angola	5	4	1	3	286	333	-47
Guinea	4	4	0	4	358	440	-82

Day 1

Morocco	81–67	Angola
Ivory Coast	106–87	Zaire

Day 2

Guinea	69–88	Zaire
Angola	59–85	Ivory Coast

Day 3

Guinea	88–102	Angola
Ivory Coast	96–72	Morocco

Day 4

Zaire	79–58	Angola
Guinea	101–111	Morocco

Day 5

Ivory Coast	139–100	Guinea
Morocco	80–77	Zaire

=== Group B ===
Team	Pts	Pld	W	L	PF	PA	Diff
Senegal	10	5	5	0	507	370	+137
Algeria	8	5	3	2	407	417	-10
Mauritania	7	5	2	3	419	459	-40
Congo	7	5	2	3	468	489	-21
Somalia	7	5	2	3	438	473	-35
Nigeria	6	5	1	4	439	470	-31

Day 1

Nigeria	87–68	Mauritania
Algeria	75–68	Somalia
Senegal	108–79	Congo

Day 2

Congo	103–90	Nigeria
Mauritania	97–93	Somalia
Senegal	94–71	Algeria

Day 3

Mauritania	82–67	Algeria
Senegal	94–73	Nigeria
Somalia	102–101	Congo

Day 4

Congo	104–102	Mauritania
Algeria	107–92	Nigeria
Senegal	103–77	Somalia

Day 5

Algeria	87–81	Congo
Senegal	108–70	Mauritania
Somalia	98–97	Nigeria

== Knockout stage ==
Semi-finals
March 27, 1980
Ivory Coast	101
Algeria	48
March 27, 1980
Senegal	126
Morocco	87

Final
March 28, 1980
Ivory Coast	90
Senegal	96
Third place
March 28, 1980
Morocco	97
Algeria	95

== Classification Stage ==
Somalia	123–93	Guinea
Mauritania	71–85	Angola
Zaire	111–114	Congo

== Final standings ==
Rank	Team	Record
1	Senegal	7-0
2	Ivory Coast	5-2
3	Morocco	4-2
4	Algeria	3-3
5	Congo	3-3
6	Zaire	2-3
7	Angola	2-3
8	Mauritania	2-4
9	Somalia	3-3
10	Guinea	0-5
11	Nigeria	1-4

Senegal qualified for the 1980 Summer Olympics in Moscow.

== Awards ==
Most Valuable Player
(Senegal) Mathieu Faye
