= Namibia men's national basketball team =

Namibia
- FIBA ranking: NR (13 July 2026)
- Joined FIBA: 1995
- FIBA zone: FIBA Africa
- National federation: Namibian Basketball Federation
- Nickname: Ellis~brown

Olympic Games
- Appearances: None

FIBA World Cup
- Appearances: None

African Championship
- Appearances: None
Home	Away

The Namibia national basketball team is the national basketball team in Namibia. It is governed by the Namibian Basketball Federation (NBF).

They have yet to qualify for the FIBA Africa Championship.

== Competitive record ==
=== Summer Olympics ===
yet to qualify

=== World championships ===
yet to qualify

=== FIBA Africa Championship ===
yet to qualify

=== African Games ===
- 1965-2015 : Did not qualify

=== Commonwealth Games ===
never participated

== Miscellaneous ==
There is an ongoing cooperation between the Namibian Basketball Federation and the German Deutscher Basketball Bund. There have been several events where German basketball coaches went to Namibia to teach basketball and support child education.
