= Sierra Leone men's national basketball team =

Sierra Leone
- Joined FIBA: 1991
- FIBA zone: FIBA Africa
- National federation: Sierra Leone National Basketball Federation
- Coach: Kane O'Leary
- Nickname: The Diamonds

Olympic Games
- Appearances: None

FIBA World Cup
- Appearances: None

FIBA Africa Championship
- Appearances: None
Home	Away

The Sierra Leone national basketball team represents Sierra Leone in international men's basketball competitions and is controlled by the Sierra Leone National Basketball Federation. The squad is mostly home-based, with a few foreign-based players.

In 2001 British born Alex Fuhrmann was named as head coach after coaching club YSC to a title run in the countries national league cup and league (This team line-up featured head coach Ali Hijazi). Fuhrmann left the post after several months due to difficulties in gaining a place in the African Championships. From March 2017 onwards, Irish born Kane O'Leary became the head coach.

== Current squad ==
- Chris Bart-Williams (Tenerife Baloncesto – Spain)
- Trevor Turner (Cannon Royals – Sierra Leone)
- Ahmed Dahniya (Cannon Royals – Sierra Leone)
- Emmanuel Bassey (YSC – Sierra Leone)
- Ernest James Johnson (Cannon Royals – Sierra Leone)
- Mobido Lymon (Wilberforce Breakers – Sierra Leone)
- Octavius Jackson (Cannon Royals – Sierra Leone)
- Jerrold Hadson-Taylor (YSC – Sierra Leone)
- Muctar Kallay (YSC – Sierra Leone)
- Osman Jalloh (Wilberforce Breakers- Sierra Leone)
- Sam Brewah (YSC – Sierra Leone)
- Mamudu Lahai (YSC – Sierra Leone)
- Head coach: Kane O'Leary

== Notable players ==
Other current notable players from Sierra Leone:

Sierra Leone men's national basketball team roster
Players	Coaches
Pos. / No. / Name / Age – Date of birth / Height / Club; F / / Charles Mammie / 24 – 6 November 1992 / 2.01 m (6 ft 7 in) / Free agent	Legend: Club – describes current club; Age – describes age on 22 March 2017

== Performance at international tournaments ==
=== Summer Olympics ===
yet to qualify

=== World championships ===
yet to qualify

=== FIBA Africa Championship ===
yet to qualify

=== African Games ===
yet to qualify

=== Commonwealth Games ===
never participated

== Miscellaneous ==
Team Sierra Leone gained some international attention when one of Germany's major basketball utility suppliers Kickz featured the Freetown Collection a basketball inspired street ware collection curated by Mallence Bart Williams.

It has since sponsored Sierra Leone's national team. Some of the collection was featured in the well known SLAM Magazine. Kickz took inspiration from Sierra Leone for various styles and schemes.

According to its own publication, the company takes some of its profits back to the basketball team of Sierra Leone. The company designed the official logo for the Sierra Leone National Basketball Federation.
