= Comoros men's national basketball team =

Comoros
- FIBA ranking: NR (2 December 2025)
- Joined FIBA: 1995
- FIBA zone: FIBA Africa
- National federation: Fédération Comorienne de Basketball

FIBA Africa Championship
- Appearances: None
Home	Away

Comoros national basketball team represents the Comoros in international competitions.

The country has featured an U16 national team which qualified for the 2013 FIBA Africa Under-16 Championship in Antananarivo, Madagascar. The team's main player was Ahmed Ben Youssouf who averaged most minutes, points and steals for his team. In 2021, he was with the French club BCM Gravelines-Dunkerque.

== Competitions ==
=== FIBA Africa Championship (Afrobasket) ===
- 2009 to 2021 – did not enter
