= Mauritius men's national basketball team =

Medical store

Mauritius
- FIBA ranking: NR (1 September 2026)
- Joined FIBA: 1959
- FIBA zone: FIBA Africa

Olympic Games
- Appearances: None

FIBA World Cup
- Appearances: None

FIBA Africa Championship
- Appearances: None

The Mauritius national basketball team is the national basketball team from Mauritius. The team is a member of FIBA Africa and has yet to qualify for the FIBA Basketball World Cup or AfroBasket finals.

== Governance ==
The Mauritius Basketball Federation oversees both men’s and women’s national teams, as well as the domestic Super League. Its leadership includes President Hedley How Foo Kiong and a management committee recognized by FIBA.

== Competitions ==
=== AfroBasket ===
Mauritius has participated in FIBA Africa pre-qualifying tournaments but has not yet advanced to the AfroBasket finals. The men’s team appeared in the AfroBasket 2025 Pre-Qualifiers.

== Development ==
=== Youth Programs ===
The Mauritius Ministry of Youth and Sports partnered with the MBBF to launch nine basketball schools across the country, aimed at teaching fundamentals and channeling talent into elite training centres.
