= Mauritania men's national basketball team =

Mauritania
- FIBA ranking: NR (1 September 2026)
- Joined FIBA: 1964
- FIBA zone: FIBA Africa
- National federation: Fédération Mauritanienne de BasketBall (FMBB)

Olympic Games
- Appearances: None

FIBA World Cup
- Appearances: None

FIBA Africa Championship
- Appearances: 4
- Medals: None
Home	Away

Mauritania national basketball team is the national basketball team in Mauritania. They have appeared in the FIBA Africa Championship and are yet to make an appearance in the FIBA World Championship.

Its best performance was at the FIBA Africa Championship 1985 in Ivory Coast, where Mauritania finished 6th, ahead of favored teams such as Nigeria and Tunisia.

== Current roster ==
At the AfroBasket 2013 qualification: (last publicized squad, incomplete)

Mauritania men's national basketball team roster
Players
Coaches

Pos.	No.	Name	Age – Date of birth	Height	Club	Ctr.
		Mamoudou Djibril Ba	24 – 1 January 1988
		Fode Diagana	19 – 1 January 1993
		Thierno Lo	21 – 1 January 1991
		Hamady Mbodj	19 – 1 January 1993
		Mamadou Thiam	22 – 13 November 1989

Head coach

Assistant coaches

Legend

- Club – describes last
  club before the tournament
- Age – describes age
  on 1 July 2012

== Competitive record ==
=== Summer Olympics ===
Yet to qualify

=== World championships ===
Yet to qualify

=== FIBA Africa Championship ===
Year	Position	Tournament	Host
1978	7th	FIBA Africa Championship 1978	Dakar, Senegal
1980	8th	FIBA Africa Championship 1980	Rabat, Morocco
1981	9th	FIBA Africa Championship 1981	Mogadishu, Somalia
1985	6th	FIBA Africa Championship 1985	Abidjan, Ivory Coast

=== African Games ===
Yet to qualify

== See also ==
- Mauritania men's national under-20 basketball team
