= Lesotho men's national basketball team =

Lesotho
- FIBA ranking: NR (1 September 2026)
- Joined FIBA: 1997
- FIBA zone: FIBA Africa

Olympic Games
- Appearances: None

FIBA World Cup
- Appearances: None

FIBA Africa Championship
- Appearances: None

The Lesotho national basketball team is the national basketball team from Lesotho. They have yet to appear in the FIBA World Championship or the FIBA Africa Championship.

== Current roster ==
At the AfroBasket 2005 qualification: (last publicized squad)

Lesotho men's national basketball team roster
Players
Coaches

Pos.	No.	Name	Age – Date of birth	Height	Club	Ctr.
	5	Motloli Kevin Mothepu	22 – 10 February 1983
	6	Phakoa Rethabile Moiloa	22 – 14 December 1982
	7	Mahlomola Makhupane	24 – 16 October 1980			(Lesotho)
	8	Tseliso Jessie Tefane	23 – 24 April 1982
	9	Thabo Mokhesi	23 – 11 December 1981
	10	Monyane Thaanyane	23 – 11 December 1981
	11	Thabang Glass	22 – 29 March 1983
	12	Letlotlo Musi Mawanda	25 – 1 April 1980
	13	Ibrahim Kurubally	22 – 20 July 1982
	14	Sekhoane Assa Mosabesha	20 – 3 October 1984			(Lesotho)
	15	Lehlohonolo Rajane	22 – 24 January 1983
C	21	Nei Beh	0 – 21 April 2005			(Tuvalu)

Head coach

Najas Hahs-Nedaj Inaj-Hclew

Assistant coaches

Legend

- Club – describes last
  club before the tournament
- Age – describes age
  on 23 May 2005
