= Republic of the Congo men's national basketball team =

Republic of the Congo
- FIBA ranking: ▲ (2 December 2025)
- Joined FIBA: 1962
- FIBA zone: FIBA Africa
- National federation: Fédération Congolaise de Basketball
- Coach: Ludovic Pouillard

Olympic Games
- Appearances: None

FIBA World Cup
- Appearances: None

FIBA Africa Championship
- Appearances: 7
- Medals: None
Home	Away

The Republic of the Congo national basketball team is the men's basketball side that represent the Republic of the Congo in international competition. They have appeared in the FIBA Africa Championship, but have yet to appear in the FIBA World Championship.

Serge Ibaka is the country's most famous player. Yet, he opted to represent Spain internationally since he had lived there for several years.

== Competitive record ==
=== Summer Olympics ===
yet to qualify

=== FIBA World Championship ===
yet to qualify

=== FIBA Africa Championship ===
Year	Position	Tournament	Host
1968	9	FIBA Africa Championship 1968	Casablanca, Morocco
1975	6	FIBA Africa Championship 1975	Alexandria, Egypt
1980	5	FIBA Africa Championship 1980	Rabat, Morocco
1981	7	FIBA Africa Championship 1981	Mogadishu, Somalia
1985	10	FIBA Africa Championship 1985	Abidjan, Côte d'Ivoire
2009	16	FIBA Africa Championship 2009	Libya
2013	14	FIBA Africa Championship 2013	Côte d'Ivoire

=== African Games ===
- 1965 : (bronze)
- 1973-2011 : Did not qualify
- 2015 : 6th
- 2019 : To be determined

== Roster ==
Team for the 2015 Afrobasket Qualification:

Congo men's national basketball team roster
Players
Coaches

Pos.	No.	Name	Age – Date of birth	Height	Club	Ctr.
G	4	Kris Morlende	35 – 28 September 1979	1.82 m (6 ft 0 in)	ADA Blois	(France)
	5	Japhie Nguia	23 – 24 March 1992	1.88 m (6 ft 2 in)	C.A.R.A.	(Republic of the Congo)
	6	Léo Okemba	31 – 29 July 1984	1.91 m (6 ft 3 in)	Le Portel	(France)
F	7	Jean Felix Moupegnou	32 – 17 October 1982	2.01 m (6 ft 7 in)	UJAP Quimper	(France)
	8	Romaric Kondzy	34 – 12 December 1980	2.00 m (6 ft 7 in)	Inter Club Brazzaville	(Republic of the Congo)
	9	Bertrand Boukinda Dibessa	34 – 6 March 1981	1.95 m (6 ft 5 in)	ASB Mazembe	(Democratic Republic of the Congo)
	11	Medhie Mouesse	22 – 12 April 1993	1.79 m (5 ft 10 in)	Anges Noirs	(Republic of the Congo)
	13	Rodel Ongoundou	22 – 3 May 1993	1.96 m (6 ft 5 in)	Inter Club Brazzaville	(Republic of the Congo)
		Hervé Valence Assoua-Wande	33 – 16 February 1982			(Republic of the Congo)
		Judicael Romaric Belemene Dzabatou	18 – 19 February 1997
		Jean Serge Davard Koumba	32 – 15 April 1983			(Republic of the Congo)
		Jacques Kay Missengue	34 – 15 July 1981
		Aymar Steph Patience Ngombo Ignongui	35 – 29 June 1980			(Republic of the Congo)
		Karl David Nkounkou	21 – 15 October 1993
		Viny Laury Obosso Endombe	20 – 3 March 1995

Head coach

- (France) Ludovic Pouillard

Assistant coach(es)

- (France) Stéphane Paty

Legend

- Club – describes last
  club before the tournament
- Age – describes age
  on 19 August 2015

== Notable players ==
Other current notable players from Republic of the Congo:

Republic of the Congo men's national basketball team roster
Players	Coaches
Pos. / No. / Name / Age – Date of birth / Height / Club; SF / / Giovan Oniangue / 26 – 22 April 1991 / 1.98 m (6 ft 6 in) / Paris-Levallois / (France)	Legend: Club – describes current club; Age – describes age on 9 May 2017

== Past rosters ==
Team for the 2013 FIBA Africa Championship.

Congo men's national basketball team roster
Players
Coaches

Pos.	No.	Name	Age – Date of birth	Height	Club	Ctr.
G	4	Kris Morlende	33 – 28 September 1979	1.82 m (6 ft 0 in)	JDA Dijon Basket	(France)
	5	Japhie Nguia	21 – 24 March 1992		BC Avenir du Rail	(Republic of the Congo)
	6	Léo Okemba	29 – 29 July 1984		Le Portel	(France)
F	7	Jean Felix Moupegnou	30 – 17 October 1982	2.01 m (6 ft 7 in)	UJAP Quimper	(France)
	8	Romaric Kondzy	32 – 12 December 1980		Inter Club Brazzaville	(Republic of the Congo)
	9	Bertrand Boukinda Dibessa	32 – 6 March 1981		ASB Mazembe	(Democratic Republic of the Congo)
F	10	Giovan Oniangue	22 – 24 April 1991	1.96 m (6 ft 5 in)	Paris-Levallois Basket	(France)
	11	Medhie Mouesse	20 – 12 April 1993		Inter Club Brazzaville	(Republic of the Congo)
F/C	12	Karl Niamamoukoko	21 – 16 February 1992	2.05 m (6 ft 9 in)	Patronage Sainte-Anne	(Republic of the Congo)
	13	Rodel Ongoundou	20 – 3 May 1993		Inter Club Brazzaville	(Republic of the Congo)
	14	Exocé Gampourou	18 – 18 October 1994

Head coach

- (France) Ludovic Pouillard

Assistant coach(es)

- (France) Stéphane Paty

Legend

- Club – describes last
  club before the tournament
- Age – describes age
  on 20 August 2013

== Kit ==
=== Manufacturer ===
Spalding

== See also ==
- Republic of the Congo national under-19 basketball team
- Republic of the Congo national under-17 basketball team
- Republic of the Congo women's national basketball team
- Republic of the Congo national 3x3 team
