= Tanzania men's national basketball team =

National sports team

Tanzania
- FIBA ranking: 144 ▼4 (1 September 2026)
- Joined FIBA: 1968
- FIBA zone: FIBA Africa
- National federation: Tanzania Basketball Federation (TBF)

Olympic Games
- Appearances: None

FIBA World Cup
- Appearances: None

African Championship
- Appearances: 1 (1974)
- Medals: None
Home	Away

The Tanzania national basketball team represents Tanzania in international competitions. It is administered by the Tanzania Basketball Federation (TBF).

== Competitive record ==
=== Summer Olympics ===
yet to qualify

=== FIBA Basketball World Cup ===
yet to qualify

=== FIBA Africa Championship ===
Year	Position	Tournament	Host
1974	8	FIBA Africa Championship 1974	Bangui, Central African Republic

=== African Games ===
yet to qualify

=== Commonwealth Games ===
never participated

== Current roster ==
At the 2013 Afrobasket Qualification: (last publicized squad)

Tanzania men's national basketball team roster
Players
Coaches

Pos.	No.	Name	Age – Date of birth	Height	Club	Ctr.
		Gerald Peter Baru	27 – 22 October 1984			(Tanzania)
		Gilbert Bdyekobola Batungi	30 – 5 January 1982			(Tanzania)
		Musa Chacha Muruga	18 – 28 October 1993			(Tanzania)
		Ladislaus Mechant Ikungura	25 – 15 December 1986
		Mwalimu Kijogoo	23 – 4 April 1989			(Tanzania)
		Juma Hamisi Kissoky	30 – 26 December 1981			(Tanzania)
		Mohamed Ally Mbaraka	29 – 28 November 1982			(Tanzania)
		Lusajo Samuel Mwakipunda	29 – 16 November 1982			(Tanzania)
		Henry Mwinuka	36 – 11 July 1975			(Tanzania)
		David Ernest Koi	24 – 9 May 1988			(Tanzania)
		Amir Saleh	33 – 8 April 1979
		Sudi Abdulrazak Ulanga	24 – 14 March 1988
		Sylvian Yunzu	23 – 5 July 1988			(Tanzania)
		Mulishid Zuberi	26 – 24 March 1986			(Tanzania)

Head coach

Assistant coaches

Legend

- Club – describes last
  club before the tournament
- Age – describes age
  on 1 July 2012

== See also ==
- Tanzania national under-19 basketball team
- Tanzania women's national basketball team

== Kit ==
=== Manufacturer ===
Jordan
