= Algeria men's national basketball team =

Algeria
- FIBA ranking: 121 (3 March 2026)
- Joined FIBA: 1963
- FIBA zone: FIBA Africa
- National federation: Algerian Basketball Federation
- Coach: Ali Bouziane

Olympic Games
- Appearances: None

FIBA World Cup
- Appearances: 1
- Medals: None

FIBA Africa Championship
- Appearances: 16
- Medals: Silver: 2001; Bronze: 1965
Home	Away

The Algeria national basketball team is the men's basketball side that represent Algeria in international competition, administered by the Fédération Algérienne de Basket-Ball.

The squad finished in the final four every time it hosted a major international basketball tournament, including the African Basketball Championship and the All-Africa Games. They played in the 2002 FIBA World Championship in the United States, where they finished 15th.

== History ==
Algeria team took part in the World Cup for the first time in 2002. It drew into the 'Group of Death' (alongside host United States, eventual Bronze medal winner Germany and Asian champion China), the Algerian Team struggled at its first Basketball World Cup appearance. They lost their first preliminary round game against the United States 60-100 and also their second and third first-round games against China (82-96) and Germany (70-102). to a 4th place out of 4 finish. In their 2nd classification game, Algeria fared much better and dominated Lebanon to a 100-70 final score.

The team withdrew from the qualifiers for the 2023 FIBA World Cup due to COVID-19 related issues and was replaced by South Sudan, who managed to qualify for their first World Cup finals.

== Competitive record ==
=== Olympic Games ===
Olympic Games record
Appearances: 0
Olympic Games finals								AfroBasket/ Pre-Olympic		
Year	Position	Pld	W	L	PF	PA	PD	Pld	W	L
(Nazi Germany) 1936	Part of France									
(United Kingdom) 1948	Part of France									
(Finland) 1952	Part of France									
(Australia) 1956	Part of France									
(Italy) 1960	Part of France									
(Japan) 1964	did not qualify									
(Mexico) 1968	did not qualify							5	2	3
(West Germany) 1972	did not qualify									
(Canada) 1976	did not qualify									
(Soviet Union) 1980	did not qualify							6	3	3
(United States) 1984	did not qualify							5	2	3
(South Korea) 1988	did not qualify							4	0	4
(Spain) 1992	did not qualify							6	2	4
(United States) 1996	did not qualify							6	3	3
(Australia) 2000	did not qualify							6	3	3
(Greece) 2004	did not qualify							6	3	3
(China) 2008	did not qualify									
(United Kingdom) 2012	did not qualify									
(Brazil) 2016	did not qualify							7	3	4
(Japan) 2020	did not qualify									
(France) 2024	did not qualify									
Total										

=== FIBA World Cup ===
World Cup record
Appearances: 1
World Cup finals								AfroBasket/ WC Qualification		
Year	Position	Pld	W	L	PF	PA	PD	Pld	W	L
(Argentina) 1950	Part of France									
(Brazil) 1954	Part of France									
(Chile) 1959	Part of France									
(Brazil) 1963	Did not qualify									
(Uruguay) 1967	Did not qualify									
(Socialist Federal Republic of Yugoslavia) 1970	Did not qualify									
(Puerto Rico) 1974	Did not qualify									
(Philippines) 1978	Did not qualify									
(Colombia) 1982	Did not qualify							6	4	2
(Spain) 1986	Did not qualify									
(Argentina) 1990	Did not qualify							5	2	3
(Canada) 1994	Did not qualify							4	2	2
(Greece) 1998	Did not qualify									
(United States) 2002	15th	5	1	4	395	476	−81	7	5	2
(Japan) 2006	Did not qualify							8	5	3
(Turkey) 2010	Did not qualify									
(Spain) 2014	Did not qualify							5	1	4
(China) 2019	Did not qualify									
(Philippines) (Japan) (Indonesia) 2023	Withdrew									
(Qatar) 2027	Did not qualify									
(France) 2031	To be determined							To be determined		
Total		5	1	4	395	476	−81			

=== AfroBasket ===
AfroBasket record
Appearances: 16
AfroBasket finals								Qualification		
Year	Position	Pld	W	L	PF	PA	PD	Pld	W	L
(United Arab Republic) 1962	did not qualify									
(Morocco) 1964	did not qualify									
(Tunisia) 1965	3rd place, bronze medalist(s)	4	2	2	210	236	−26			
(Morocco) 1968	8th	5	2	3	349	353	−4			
(United Arab Republic) 1970	did not qualify									
(Senegal) 1972	did not qualify									
(Central African Republic) 1974	did not qualify									
(Egypt) 1975	did not qualify									
(Senegal) 1978	did not qualify									
(Morocco) 1980	4th	6	3	3	550	615	−65			
(Somalia) 1981	4th	6	4	2	364	335	+29			
(Egypt) 1983	6th	5	2	3	337	352	−15			
(Ivory Coast) 1985	did not qualify									
(Tunisia) 1987	8th	4	0	4	260	315	−55			
(Angola) 1989	6th	5	2	3	399	488	−89			
(Egypt) 1992	9th	6	2	4	438	434	+4			
(Kenya) 1993	5th	4	2	2	197	236	−39			
(Algeria) 1995	4th	6	3	3	385	363	+22			
(Senegal) 1997	did not qualify									
(Angola) 1999	6th	6	3	3	379	387	−8			
(Morocco) 2001	2nd place, silver medalist(s)	7	5	2	507	451	+56			
(Egypt) 2003	7th	6	3	3	458	450	+8			
(Algeria) 2005	4th	8	5	3	579	571	+8			
(Angola) 2007	did not qualify									
(Libya) 2009	did not qualify							4	1	3
(Madagascar) 2011	did not qualify							2	0	2
(Ivory Coast) 2013	12th	5	1	4	308	353	−45	2	1	1
(Tunisia) 2015	6th	7	3	4	514	517	−3	3	2	1
(Senegal) (Tunisia) 2017	did not qualify							4	0	4
(Rwanda) 2021	Withdrew in qualification							1	0	1
(Angola) 2025	Withdrew in qualification							Wd in qualif.		
2029	To be determined							To be determined		
Total		90	42	48	6234	6456	−222			

=== African Games ===
African Games record
Appearances: 5
Year	Position	Pld	W	L	PF	PA	PD
(Republic of the Congo) 1965	4th	5	2	3	112	178	−66
(Nigeria) 1973	did not qualify						
(Algeria) 1978	4th	4	1	3	315	323	−8
(Kenya) 1987	did not qualify						
(Egypt) 1991	did not qualify						
(Zimbabwe) 1995	?th						
(South Africa) 1999	did not qualify						
(Nigeria) 2003	did not qualify						
(Algeria) 2007	5th	7	4	3	451	468	−17
(Mozambique) 2011	4th	7	3	4	417	455	−38
(Republic of the Congo) 2015	did not qualify						
(Morocco) 2019	competition not held						
(Ghana) 2023	competition not held						
Total							

=== AfroCan ===
- 2019 Mali : 8th
- 2023 Angola : did not enter
- 2027 Rwanda : To be determined

=== Arab Championship ===
- 1974 Iraq : 4th
- 1981 Tunisia : 2nd
- 1994 Egypt : 2nd
- 2000 Algeria : 2nd
- 2002 Egypt : 2nd
- 2005 Saudi Arabia : Winner
- 2008 Tunisia : 5th
- 2009 Morocco : 5th
- 2010 Lebanon : 4th
- 2015 Egypt: 2nd
- 2017 Egypt: 6th
- 2018 Egypt: 2nd
- 2022 United Arab Emirates : 3rd
- 2023 Egypt : 5th
- 2025 Bahrain : Winner

=== Mediterranean Games ===
- 1967 Tunis: 8th
- 1975 Algiers: 8th
- 1993 Languedoc-Roussillon: 9th
- 2001 Tunis: 7th
- 2005 Almería: 7th
- 2013 Mersin: 7th

=== Islamic Solidarity Games ===
- 2005 Saudi Arabia : 2nd
- 2013 Indonesia : did not enter

== Roster ==
Team for the 2025 Arab Basketball Championship.

Algeria men's national basketball team roster
Players
Coaches

Pos.	No.	Name	Age – Date of birth	Height	Club	Ctr.
	1	Moussaab Koob	22 – 1 March 2003	1.94 m (6 ft 4 in)	USM Blida	(Algeria)
PF	2	Lamouri Merahi	29 – 6 October 1995	1.95 m (6 ft 5 in)	USM Alger	(Algeria)
C	7	Faredj Messaoudi	22 – 20 January 2003	2.15 m (7 ft 1 in)	USM Alger	(Algeria)
	9	Mohammed Amine Bensalah	–	2.02 m (6 ft 8 in)	NB Staouéli	(Algeria)
	10	Chakib Sedoud	20 – 15 October 2004	2.03 m (6 ft 8 in)	NB Staouéli	(Algeria)
	12	Sid Ali Ben Zaim	–	2.04 m (6 ft 8 in)
	14	Louai Chebel	27 – 29 January 1998	1.97 m (6 ft 6 in)	WA Boufarik	(Algeria)
	20	Sofiane Briki	26 – 15 April 1999	1.92 m (6 ft 4 in)		(France)
	24	Sami Aious	19 – 12 October 2005	1.99 m (6 ft 6 in)	NB Staouéli	(Algeria)
	26	Mahdi Zaim	20 – 15 February 2005	2.07 m (6 ft 9 in)
	32	Nadyr Labouize	27 – 31 August 1997	1.87 m (6 ft 2 in)	Béliers de Kemper	(France)
	35	Mohamed Amine Roubai	–	1.97 m (6 ft 6 in)
	93	Adel Alain	21 – 30 April 2004	1.88 m (6 ft 2 in)	Saint-Chamond ABB	(France)

Head coach

- (Algeria) Ali Bouziane

Legend

- Club – describes last
  club before the tournament
- Age – describes age
  on 25 July 2025

== Notable players ==
There are several Algerian players playing professionally in Europe, mostly in France. As of 2010/2011, two play in the top level division.

- Ali Bouziane (JDA Dijon)
- Ahmed Fellah (Entente Orléanaise 45)

== Head coach position ==
- (Soviet Union) Sergey Bashkin: 1977–1981
- (Algeria) Faid Bilal: 2000–2002
- (Algeria) Ahmed Loubachria:2007-2009
- (Algeria) Ali Filali:2009-2010
- (United States) Sean Whalen: 2010-2013
- (Algeria) Faid Bilal: 2013-2014
- (Algeria) Ali Filali: 2014-2015
- (Algeria) Ahmed Loubachria: 2016-2017
- (Algeria) Mohamed Yahya: 2018-2019
- (Algeria) Faid Bilal: 2019- Dec 2021
- (Algeria) Ahmed Bendjabou: 2022- Aug 2024
- (Algeria) Ali Bouziane: Mar 2025- now

== Kit ==
=== Manufacturer ===
2015: Peak

=== Sponsor ===
2015: Ooredoo
