= FIBA Africa Championship 1981 =

1981 FIBA AfroBasket
11th FIBA African Basketball Championship

Tournament details
- Host country: Somalia
- Dates: December 15-23
- Teams: 11 (from 39 federations)
- Venue: 1 (in 1 host city)

Final positions
- Champions: Ivory Coast (1st title)

The FIBA Africa Championship 1981 was hosted by Somalia from December 15 to December 23, 1981. Games were played in the national capital Mogadishu. Egypt and Cote d'Ivoire competed in the final. The Cote d'Ivoire squad wound up winning the tournament, its first FIBA Africa Championship, and as a result qualified for the 1982 FIBA World Championship. Somalia and Algeria played for third place, with the Somalia squad emerging victorious.

== Competing nations ==
The following national teams competed:

| Group A | Group B |
|---|---|
| Algeria; Angola; Congo; Somalia; Tunisia | Ivory Coast; Egypt; Mauritania; Mozambique; Senegal; Zimbabwe |

== Preliminary rounds ==
=== Group A ===
| Team | Pts | Pld | W | L | PF | PA | Diff |
|---|---|---|---|---|---|---|---|
| Somalia | 8 | 4 | 4 | 0 | 400 | 264 | +35 |
| Algeria | 7 | 4 | 3 | 1 | 364 | 331 | +33 |
| Congo | 6 | 4 | 2 | 2 | 386 | 371 | +15 |
| Tunisia | 5 | 4 | 1 | 3 | 240 | 301 | -61 |
| Angola | 4 | 4 | 0 | 4 | 273 | 295 | -22 |

Day 1

| Somalia | 81–31 | Angola |
| Tunisia | 56–54 | Angola |

Day 2

| Algeria | 56–58 | Somalia |
| Angola | 84–85 | Algeria |

Day 3

| Tunisia | 71–100 | Congo |
| Congo | 73–64 | Angola |

Day 4

| Somalia | 65–55 | Tunisia |
| Congo | 82–95 | Somalia |

Day 5

| Algeria | 82–58 | Tunisia |
| Algeria | 141–131 | Congo |

=== Group B ===
| Team | Pts | Pld | W | L | PF | PA | Diff |
|---|---|---|---|---|---|---|---|
| Ivory Coast | 9 | 5 | 4 | 1 | 398 | 274 | +124 |
| Egypt | 9 | 5 | 4 | 1 | 393 | 315 | +78 |
| Senegal | 8 | 5 | 3 | 2 | 380 | 304 | +76 |
| Mauritania | 7 | 5 | 2 | 3 | 276 | 327 | -51 |
| Mozambique | 7 | 5 | 2 | 3 | 290 | 347 | -57 |
| Zimbabwe | 5 | 5 | 0 | 5 | 272 | 442 | -160 |

Day 1

| Ivory Coast | 102–46 | Zimbabwe |
| Egypt | 80–67 | Mozambique |
| Senegal | 70–52 | Mauritania |

Day 2

| Egypt | 102–73 | Zimbabwe |
| Ivory Coast | 72–56 | Mauritania |
| Mozambique | 60–58 | Senegal |

Day 3

| Mauritania | 64–46 | Zimbabwe |
| Egypt | 71–70 | Senegal |
| Ivory Coast | 79–24 | Mozambique |

Day 4

| Senegal | 96–42 | Zimbabwe |
| Mauritania | 65–61 | Mozambique |
| Ivory Coast | 66–62 | Egypt |

Day 5

| Mozambique | 78–65 | Zimbabwe |
| Senegal | 86–79 | Ivory Coast |
| Egypt | 78–39 | Mauritania |

== Knockout stage ==
Semi-finals
December 21, 1981
Ivory Coast | 2
Algeria (w/o) | 0
December 21, 1981
Egypt | 84
Somalia | 80

Final
December 23, 1981
Ivory Coast | 81
Egypt | 65
Third place
December 23, 1981
Somalia | 2
Algeria (w/o) | 0

== Classification Stage ==
| Tunisia | 55–54 | Mauritania |
| Congo | 0–2 | Senegal |
| Mozambique | 0–2 | Angola |

== Final standings ==
| Rank | Team | Record |
|---|---|---|
| 1 | Ivory Coast | 6-1 |
| 2 | Egypt | 5-2 |
| 3 | Somalia | 5-1 |
| 4 | Algeria | 4-2 |
| 5 | Senegal | 3-2 |
| 6 | Tunisia | 2-3 |
| 7 | Congo | 2-3 |
| 8 | Angola | 1-4 |
| 9 | Mauritania | 2-4 |
| 10 | Mozambique | 2-4 |
| 11 | Zimbabwe | 0-5 |

Cote d'Ivoire qualified for the 1982 FIBA World Championship in Colombia.
