= FIBA Africa Championship 1985 =

1985 FIBA AfroBasket
13th FIBA African Basketball Championship

Tournament details
- Host country: Ivory Coast
- Dates: December 20-28
- Teams: 12 (from 40 federations)
- Venue: 1 (in 1 host city)

Final positions
- Champions: Ivory Coast (2nd title)

Tournament statistics
- MVP: (Angola) José Carlos Guimarães

The FIBA Africa Championship 1985 was hosted by Ivory Coast from December 20 to December 28, 1985. The games were played in Abidjan. Ivory Coast won the tournament, its second African Championship, by beating Angola in the final. Both teams qualified for the 1986 FIBA World Championship as a result of their showing in this tournament.

== Competing nations ==
The following national teams competed:

Group A	Group B
Angola; Central African Republic; Congo; Ivory Coast; Kenya; Tunisia	Egypt; Guinea; Mauritania; Mozambique; Nigeria; Senegal

== Preliminary rounds ==
=== Group A ===
Team	Pts	Pld	W	L	PF	PA	Diff
Angola	9	5	4	1	420	359	+61
Ivory Coast	9	5	4	1	437	338	+99
Central African Republic	9	5	4	1	427	370	+57
Tunisia	7	5	2	3	333	393	-60
Congo	6	5	1	4	379	396	-17
Kenya	5	5	0	5	330	470	-140

Day 1

Ivory Coast	74–54	Tunisia
Congo	118–61	Kenya
Angola	102–84	Central African Republic

Day 2

Kenya	67–75	Central African Republic
Congo	71–73	Tunisia
Ivory Coast	92–77	Angola

Day 3

Kenya	79–96	Tunisia
Angola	90–77	Congo
Central African Republic	92–76	Ivory Coast

Day 4

Central African Republic	83–57	Congo
Kenya	59–106	Ivory Coast
Angola	76–42	Tunisia

Day 5

Angola	75–64	Kenya
Central African Republic	93–68	Tunisia
Ivory Coast	89–56	Congo

=== Group B ===
Team	Pts	Pld	W	L	PF	PA	Diff
Senegal	10	5	5	0	428	327	+101
Egypt	9	5	4	1	467	328	+139
Mauritania	8	5	3	2	346	406	-60
Nigeria	7	5	2	3	403	432	-29
Mozambique	6	5	1	4	371	378	-7
Guinea	5	5	0	5	329	473	-144

Day 1

Senegal	75–74	Egypt
Nigeria	87–68	Guinea
Mauritania	67–66	Mozambique

Day 2

Mauritania	85–84	Nigeria
Senegal	102–60	Guinea
Egypt	81–73	Mozambique

Day 3

Mozambique	109–70	Guinea
Egypt	104–68	Mauritania
Senegal	97–93	Nigeria

Day 4

Egypt	103–61	Guinea
Senegal	82–54	Mauritania
Nigeria	88–77	Mozambique

Day 5

Mauritania	72–70	Guinea
Egypt	105–51	Nigeria
Senegal	72–46	Mozambique

== Knockout stage ==
Semi-finals
December 27, 1985
Angola	83
Egypt	69
December 27, 1985
Ivory Coast	92
Senegal	79

Final
December 28, 1985
Angola	73
Ivory Coast	84
Third place
December 28, 1985
Egypt	74
Senegal	73

== Classification Stage ==
Central African Republic	104–64	Mauritania
Tunisia	69–74	Nigeria
Congo	69–75	Mozambique
Kenya	68–80	Guinea

== Final standings ==
Rank	Team	Record
1	Ivory Coast	6-1
2	Angola	5-2
3	Egypt	5-2
4	Senegal	5-2
5	Central African Republic	5-1
6	Mauritania	3-3
7	Nigeria	3-3
8	Tunisia	2-4
9	Mozambique	2-4
10	Congo	1-5
11	Guinea	1-5
12	Kenya	0-6
