= FIBA AfroBasket 2021 squads =

This article displays the rosters for the participating teams at the AfroBasket 2021.

Age and club as of 24 August 2021.

== Group A ==
=== Angola ===
Angola men's national basketball team roster
Players
Coaches

Pos.	No.	Name	Age – Date of birth	Height	Club	Ctr.
G	3	Gerson Gonçalves	25 – 29 March 1996	1.93 m (6 ft 4 in)	Petro de Luanda	(Angola)
PG	5	Childe Dundão	23 – 17 May 1998	1.67 m (5 ft 6 in)	Petro de Luanda	(Angola)
G	6	Carlos Morais	35 – 16 October 1985	1.91 m (6 ft 3 in)	Petro de Luanda	(Angola)
SF	7	Jone Pedro	31 – 28 May 1990	2.08 m (6 ft 10 in)	Petro de Luanda	(Angola)
C	8	Jilson Bango	22 – 6 January 1999	2.08 m (6 ft 10 in)	Primeiro de Agosto	(Angola)
F	9	Leonel Paulo	35 – 30 April 1986	1.98 m (6 ft 6 in)	Petro de Luanda	(Angola)
F/C	11	Teotonio Dò	27 – 20 March 1994	2.05 m (6 ft 9 in)	Primeiro de Agosto	(Angola)
PF	13	Aboubakar Gakou	24 – 27 May 1997	2.01 m (6 ft 7 in)	Petro de Luanda	(Angola)
G	14	Edson Ndoniema	30 – 11 February 1991	1.92 m (6 ft 4 in)	Primeiro de Agosto	(Angola)
PF	15	Eduardo Mingas	42 – 29 January 1979	1.98 m (6 ft 6 in)	Primeiro de Agosto	(Angola)
PG	16	Hermenegildo Santos	31 – 16 August 1990	1.90 m (6 ft 3 in)	Primeiro de Agosto	(Angola)
G	19	Glofate Buiamba	22 – 15 January 1999	1.96 m (6 ft 5 in)	Interclube	(Angola)

Head coach

- (Spain) Josep Clarós

Assistant coach(es)

- (Angola) Miguel Lutonda
- (Angola) Anibal Moreira

Legend

- Club – describes last
  club before the competition
- Age – describes age
  on 24 August 2021

=== Cape Verde ===
Cape Verde men's national basketball team roster
Players
Coaches

Pos.	No.	Name	Age – Date of birth	Height	Club	Ctr.
SF	0	Patrick Lima	26 – 2 May 1995	1.90 m (6 ft 3 in)	Predio	(Cape Verde)
PG	4	Jeff Xavier	35 – 7 September 1985	1.85 m (6 ft 1 in)	Cáceres	(Spain)
F	6	Ivan Almeida	32 – 10 May 1989	1.97 m (6 ft 6 in)	Anwill Włocławek	(Poland)
PG	7	Fidel Mendonca	37 – 7 July 1984	1.89 m (6 ft 2 in)	Predio	(Cape Verde)
SG	8	Anderson Correia	23 – 31 October 1997	1.92 m (6 ft 4 in)	Chamusca	(Portugal)
SF	9	Joel Almeida	35 – 11 October 1985	1.92 m (6 ft 4 in)	Kutaisi 2010	(Georgia (country))
PF	10	Kenneti Mendes	31 – 17 August 1990	2.03 m (6 ft 8 in)	Galitos	(Portugal)
SF	11	Patrick Abreu	30 – 20 March 1991	1.91 m (6 ft 3 in)	Predio	(Cape Verde)
C	13	Sekouba Condé	31 – 31 December 1989	2.01 m (6 ft 7 in)	Viana	(Angola)
C	14	Ailton Lopes	25 – 18 September 1995	2.05 m (6 ft 9 in)	CB Clavijo	(Spain)
PF	15	Kevin Coronel	29 – 3 September 1991	1.98 m (6 ft 6 in)	Tarragona	(Spain)
C	22	Edy Tavares	29 – 22 March 1992	2.20 m (7 ft 3 in)	Real Madrid	(Spain)

Head coach

- (Angola) Emanuel Trovoada

Assistant coach(es)

- (Cape Verde) Edmilson Abreu
- (Cape Verde) Danielson Miranda

Legend

- Club – describes last
  club before the competition
- Age – describes age
  on 24 August 2021

=== DR Congo ===
DR Congo men's national basketball team roster
Players
Coaches

Pos.	No.	Name	Age – Date of birth	Height	Club	Ctr.
C	5	Henry Pwono	30 – 21 July 1991	2.01 m (6 ft 7 in)	Etzella	(Luxembourg)
PF	6	Chadrack Lufile	30 – 11 September 1990	2.06 m (6 ft 9 in)	Free agent
PG	7	Maxi Munanga	27 – 25 December 1993	1.90 m (6 ft 3 in)	Free agent
G	10	Haboubacar Sakho	27 – 24 January 1994	1.90 m (6 ft 3 in)	JS Menzah	(Tunisia)
C	13	Arsene Mutomb	34 – 9 August 1987	2.09 m (6 ft 10 in)	SCTP	(Democratic Republic of the Congo)
F	15	Rolly Fula	28 – 2 February 1993	2.01 m (6 ft 7 in)	ASB Mazembe	(Democratic Republic of the Congo)
C	18	Jordan Sakho	24 – 4 April 1997	2.07 m (6 ft 9 in)	Burgos	(Spain)
PF	22	Rodrigue Munsi-Kaniki	23 – 11 November 1997	1.99 m (6 ft 6 in)	Aix-les-Baines	(France)
F	23	Patrick Mwamba	21 – 11 October 1999	2.01 m (6 ft 7 in)	UT Arlington Mavericks	(United States)
F	32	Eric Kibi	31 – 4 August 1990	1.98 m (6 ft 6 in)	The Hague Royals	(Netherlands)
C	34	Garmine Kande-Kieli	22 – 24 August 1999	2.05 m (6 ft 9 in)	Aix-les-Baines	(France)
SF	35	Joel Ntambwe	22 – 17 October 1998	2.03 m (6 ft 8 in)	Texas Tech Red Raiders	(United States)

Head coach

- (Norway) Mathias Eckhoff

Assistant coach(es)

- (Democratic Republic of the Congo) Charly Kashala

Legend

- Club – describes last
  club before the competition
- Age – describes age
  on 24 August 2021

=== Rwanda ===
Rwanda men's national basketball team roster
Players
Coaches

Pos.	No.	Name	Age – Date of birth	Height	Club	Ctr.
PG	4	Jean Nshobozwabyose	23 – 26 June 1998	1.83 m (6 ft 0 in)	Patriots	(Rwanda)
G	5	Ntore Habimana	24 – 15 August 1997	1.96 m (6 ft 5 in)	Wilfrid Laurier Golden Hawks	(Canada)
SG	6	Steven Hagumintwari	27 – 1 October 1993	1.93 m (6 ft 4 in)	Patriots	(Rwanda)
SG	7	Armel Sangwe	24 – 15 April 1997	1.90 m (6 ft 3 in)	Espoir	(Rwanda)
SG	8	Emile Kazeneza	20 – 30 August 2000	2.01 m (6 ft 7 in)	William Carey University	(United States)
SG	9	Dieudonné Ndizeye	24 – 14 October 1996	1.98 m (6 ft 6 in)	Patriots	(Rwanda)
PF	10	Olivier Shyaka	26 – 14 August 1995	2.00 m (6 ft 7 in)	REG	(Rwanda)
F	11	Alex Mpoyo	24 – 5 January 1997	2.01 m (6 ft 7 in)	Trepça	(Kosovo)
SG	12	Kenny Gasana	36 – 9 November 1984	1.90 m (6 ft 3 in)	Patriots	(Rwanda)
C	13	Elie Kaje	26 – 17 March 1995	1.90 m (6 ft 3 in)	Patriots	(Rwanda)
C	16	Prince Ibeh	27 – 3 June 1994	2.06 m (6 ft 9 in)	Patriots	(Rwanda)
SF	17	William Robeyns	25 – 23 February 1996	1.91 m (6 ft 3 in)	Phoenix Brussels	(Belgium)

Head coach

- (Senegal) Cheikh Sarr

Assistant coach(es)

- (Rwanda) Yves Murenzi
- (Rwanda) Henry Mwinuka

Legend

- Club – describes last
  club before the competition
- Age – describes age
  on 24 August 2021

== Group B ==
=== Central African Republic ===
Central African Republic men's national basketball team roster
Players
Coaches

Pos.	No.	Name	Age – Date of birth	Height	Club	Ctr.
C	5	Kevarrius Hayes	24 – 5 March 1997	2.06 m (6 ft 9 in)	Bursaspor	(Turkey)
PG	6	Michael Mokongo	35 – 11 July 1986	1.80 m (5 ft 11 in)	Trappes	(France)
F	7	Kurt-Curry Wegscheider	20 – 30 May 2001	1.94 m (6 ft 4 in)	NBA Academy	(Senegal)
C	8	Johan Grebongo	27 – 18 January 1994	2.00 m (6 ft 7 in)	ASSM Pfastatt	(France)
F	10	Romain Sato	40 – 2 March 1981	1.95 m (6 ft 5 in)	Free agent
G	11	Yannick Zachée	34 – 29 October 1986	1.92 m (6 ft 4 in)	Le Cannet	(France)
C	12	Steven-Emile Perriere	25 – 7 September 1995	2.04 m (6 ft 8 in)	Lincoln Memorial Railsplitters	(United States)
F	13	Max Kouguere	34 – 12 March 1987	1.99 m (6 ft 6 in)	Boulazac Dordogne	(France)
C	15	Jimmy Djimrabaye	29 – 8 April 1992	2.03 m (6 ft 8 in)	Quimper	(France)
PG	16	Jean Nganafio Sokambi	24 – 23 October 1996	1.88 m (6 ft 2 in)	Abeilles	(Central African Republic)
G	27	Metson Nambaï	26 – 27 February 1995	1.93 m (6 ft 4 in)	Abeilles	(Central African Republic)
PF	41	Eddy Ngoy	24 – 28 January 1997	2.01 m (6 ft 7 in)	ASVEL	(France)

Head coach

- (Central African Republic) Maxime Zianveni

Assistant coach(es)

- (Central African Republic) Wilfried Gbongo
- (Central African Republic) Ulrich Marida

Legend

- Club – describes last
  club before the competition
- Age – describes age
  on 24 August 2021

=== Egypt ===
Egypt men's national basketball team roster
Players
Coaches

Pos.	No.	Name	Age – Date of birth	Height	Club	Ctr.
PG	0	Ahmed Metwaly	24 – 15 February 1997	1.77 m (5 ft 10 in)	Al Ittihad	(Egypt)
G	4	Ehab Saleh	26 – 1 August 1995	1.85 m (6 ft 1 in)	Al Ahly	(Egypt)
PF	5	Amr Abdelhalim	30 – 14 June 1991	1.93 m (6 ft 4 in)	Al Ahly	(Egypt)
PG	8	Omar Farag	23 – 5 April 1998	1.91 m (6 ft 3 in)	Smouha	(Egypt)
PF	10	Anas Mahmoud	26 – 9 May 1995	2.14 m (7 ft 0 in)	Zamalek	(Egypt)
F	12	Youssef Aboushousha	28 – 9 June 1993	1.92 m (6 ft 4 in)	Al Ittihad	(Egypt)
PG	13	Yusuf Shehata	25 – 16 January 1996	1.83 m (6 ft 0 in)	Sporting Alexandria	(Egypt)
C	14	Moustafa Elmekawi	26 – 22 October 1994	2.08 m (6 ft 10 in)	Zamalek	(Egypt)
C	22	Ahmed Khalaf	22 – 24 February 1999	2.11 m (6 ft 11 in)	Al Ittihad	(Egypt)
C	42	Aly Ahmed	29 – 15 March 1992	2.04 m (6 ft 8 in)	Al Ittihad	(Egypt)
SG	44	Omar Hesham	26 – 29 March 1995	1.87 m (6 ft 2 in)	Zamalek	(Egypt)
C	55	Omar Oraby	29 – 8 September 1991	2.18 m (7 ft 2 in)	Al Ahly	(Egypt)

Head coach

- (Egypt) Ahmed Marei

Assistant coach(es)

- (Egypt) Wessam El-Diasty
- (Egypt) Mohamed Selim

Legend

- Club – describes last
  club before the tournament
- Age – describes age
  on 24 August 2021

=== Guinea ===
Guinea men's national basketball team roster
Players
Coaches

Pos.	No.	Name	Age – Date of birth	Height	Club	Ctr.
PF	0	Mambourou Mara	18 – 3 August 2003	1.94 m (6 ft 4 in)	Centre Fédéral de Guinée	(Guinea)
SF	1	Abdoulaye Sylla	27 – 2 September 1993	1.98 m (6 ft 6 in)	Thames Valley Cavaliers	(United Kingdom)
PG	2	Daouda Diaby	21 – 27 April 2000	1.86 m (6 ft 1 in)	Florida Preparatory Academy	(United States)
PG	5	Mehdi Lesbarrères	19 – 30 January 2002	1.82 m (6 ft 0 in)	Boulazac Basket Dordogne	(France)
SG	7	Abdoulaye Sy	26 – 14 April 1995	2.00 m (6 ft 7 in)	CEP Lorient	(France)
F	10	Cedric Mansare	35 – 18 October 1985	1.95 m (6 ft 5 in)	Dax-Gamarde	(France)
SF	13	Tidjan Keita	24 – 30 November 1996	2.05 m (6 ft 9 in)	VfL Kirchheim Knights	(Germany)
C	14	Daouda Conde	29 – 10 June 1992	2.04 m (6 ft 8 in)	FC Mulhouse Basket	(France)
SG	21	Ibrahima Doumbouya	23 – 7 October 1997	1.85 m (6 ft 1 in)	UNB Reds	(Canada)
PF	23	Cheick Condé	29 – 20 June 1992	2.04 m (6 ft 8 in)	Union Rennes Basket 35	(France)
PG	24	Ibrahim Fofana	23 – 24 June 1998	1.96 m (6 ft 5 in)	SLAC	(Guinea)
PF	35	Mohamed Queta	26 – 1 May 1995	2.04 m (6 ft 8 in)	Saint-Chamond Basket	(France)

Head coach

- (Serbia) Zeljko Zecevic

Assistant coach(es)

- (Guinea) Malick Kone

Legend

- Club – describes last
  club before the competition
- Age – describes age
  on 24 August 2021

=== Tunisia ===
Tunisia men's national basketball team roster
Players
Coaches

Pos.	No.	Name	Age – Date of birth	Height	Club	Ctr.
G	1	Oussama Marnaoui	22 – 16 June 1999	1.93 m (6 ft 4 in)	US Monastir	(Tunisia)
G	3	Achref Gannouni	24 – 16 April 1997	1.92 m (6 ft 4 in)	ES Radès	(Tunisia)
PG	4	Omar Abada	28 – 20 April 1993	1.89 m (6 ft 2 in)	US Monastir	(Tunisia)
SG	5	Ziyed Chennoufi	22 – 29 November 1998	2.01 m (6 ft 7 in)	Ezzahra Sports	(Tunisia)
SG	7	Mourad El Mabrouk	34 – 19 October 1986	1.85 m (6 ft 1 in)	Ezzahra Sports	(Tunisia)
C	11	Mokhtar Ghyaza	34 – 15 November 1986	2.04 m (6 ft 8 in)	US Monastir	(Tunisia)
PF	12	Makrem Ben Romdhane	32 – 27 March 1989	2.04 m (6 ft 8 in)	Benfica	(Portugal)
PG	14	Amrou Bouallegue	25 – 24 December 1995	1.94 m (6 ft 4 in)	ES Radès	(Tunisia)
SG	20	Michael Roll	34 – 12 April 1987	1.95 m (6 ft 5 in)	Olimpia Milano	(Italy)
PF	32	Ahmed Addami	24 – 14 July 1997	2.03 m (6 ft 8 in)	Club Africain	(Tunisia)
F	45	Radhouane Slimane	41 – 16 August 1980	2.05 m (6 ft 9 in)	US Monastir	(Tunisia)
C	50	Salah Mejri	35 – 15 June 1986	2.17 m (7 ft 1 in)	Étoile Sportive du Sahel	(Tunisia)

Head coach

- (Germany) Dirk Bauermann

Assistant coach(es)

- (Tunisia) Amine Rzig
- (Tunisia) Oualid Zrida

Legend

- Club – describes last
  club before the competition
- Age – describes age
  on 24 August 2021

== Group C ==
=== Ivory Coast ===
Ivory Coast men's national basketball team roster
Players
Coaches

Pos.	No.	Name	Age – Date of birth	Height	Club	Ctr.
SG	5	Jean-François Kebe	26 – 14 October 1994	1.85 m (6 ft 1 in)	Saint-Quentin	(France)
PG	6	Bryan Pamba	29 – 7 January 1992	1.91 m (6 ft 3 in)	Rennes	(France)
SG	8	Stephane Konate	41 – 23 August 1980	1.92 m (6 ft 4 in)	ABC Fighters	(Ivory Coast)
PG	10	Mouloukou Diabate	34 – 21 July 1987	1.83 m (6 ft 0 in)	Zamalek	(Egypt)
F	12	Vafessa Fofana	29 – 12 June 1992	2.01 m (6 ft 7 in)	Cholet	(France)
PG	13	Nisre Zouzoua	25 – 16 July 1996	1.86 m (6 ft 1 in)	Dax-Gamarde	(France)
SG	14	Guy Edi	32 – 26 December 1988	1.99 m (6 ft 6 in)	Champagne Basket	(France)
C	15	Willy Kouassi	29 – 29 December 1991	2.09 m (6 ft 10 in)	DSG	(Tunisia)
PF	16	Bali Coulibaly	26 – 3 July 1995	2.01 m (6 ft 7 in)	TOAC	(France)
G	19	Lionel Kouadio	19 – 1 September 2001	1.93 m (6 ft 4 in)	Abidjan Azur	(Ivory Coast)
C	23	Cédric Bah	27 – 11 May 1994	2.00 m (6 ft 7 in)	ADA Blois	(France)
PF	24	Matt Costello	28 – 5 August 1993	2.08 m (6 ft 10 in)	CB Gran Canaria	(Spain)

Head coach

- (Spain) Natxo Lezkano

Assistant coach(es)

- (Ivory Coast) Miguel Hoyo
- (Ivory Coast) Mickaël Toti

=== Kenya ===
Kenya men's national basketball team roster
Players
Coaches

Pos.	No.	Name	Age – Date of birth	Height	Club	Ctr.
PG	4	Situma Khaemba	29 – 6 September 1991	1.75 m (5 ft 9 in)	Ulinzi Warriors	(Kenya)
PG	5	Griffin Ligare	36 – 19 May 1985	1.75 m (5 ft 9 in)	Nairobi City Thunder	(Kenya)
SG	6	Erick Mutoro	29 – 29 May 1992	1.80 m (5 ft 11 in)	Ulinzi Warriors	(Kenya)
G	7	Victor Bosire	32 – 31 December 1988	1.75 m (5 ft 9 in)	Ulinzi Warriors	(Kenya)
PF	8	Fidel Okoth	24 – 24 October 1996	2.03 m (6 ft 8 in)	Strathmore University	(Kenya)
SF	9	Tylor Ongwae	30 – 15 July 1991	2.01 m (6 ft 7 in)	Bakken Bears	(Denmark)
SF	10	Albert Odero	24 – 21 June 1997	1.96 m (6 ft 5 in)	Arkansas Tech Wonder Boys	(United States)
SF	11	Valentine Nyakinda	29 – 16 March 1992	2.03 m (6 ft 8 in)	Kenya Ports Authority	(Kenya)
C	12	Desmond Owili	33 – 22 February 1988	2.08 m (6 ft 10 in)	Kilsyth Cobras	(Australia)
PF	13	Ronald Gombe	29 – 21 July 1992	2.03 m (6 ft 8 in)	CB Villarrobledo	(Spain)
C	14	Tom Wamukota	27 – 28 September 1993	2.13 m (7 ft 0 in)	Patriots BBC	(Rwanda)
PF	15	Okall Koranga	31 – 18 March 1990	2.03 m (6 ft 8 in)	Kampala International University	(Uganda)

Head coach

- (Australia) Liz Mills

Assistant coach(es)

- (Kenya) Collins Gaya

Legend

- Club – describes last
  club before the tournament
- Age – describes age
  on 24 August 2021

=== Mali ===
Mali men's national basketball team roster
Players
Coaches

Pos.	No.	Name	Age – Date of birth	Height	Club	Ctr.
PG	3	Mahamadou Kanté	29 – 2 March 1992	1.92 m (6 ft 4 in)	GS Pétroliers	(Algeria)
PG	4	Siriman Kanouté	19 – 25 September 2001	1.76 m (5 ft 9 in)	SLUC Nancy	(France)
F	7	Ibrahim Djambo	29 – 14 July 1992	2.08 m (6 ft 10 in)	CEP Lorient	(France)
SG	9	Papa Tandina	28 – 18 April 1993	1.90 m (6 ft 3 in)	AS Police	(Mali)
PF	11	Abdramane Camara	21 – 11 April 2000	2.05 m (6 ft 9 in)	Chorale Roanne	(France)
PF	12	Abdoul Karim Coulibaly	20 – 23 December 2000	2.04 m (6 ft 8 in)	St. Bonaventure Bonnies	(United States)
F	13	Benke Diarouma	26 – 12 August 1995	2.01 m (6 ft 7 in)	AS Police	(Mali)
SG	16	Mamadou Keita	28 – 1 February 1993	1.90 m (6 ft 3 in)	AS Police	(Mali)
	20	Soumaila Sissouma	19 – 1 December 2001		AS Mandé	(Mali)
F	23	Namakan Traoré	23 – 16 April 1998	1.96 m (6 ft 5 in)	CRB Dar El Beida	(Algeria)
SG	45	N'faly Kanouté	24 – 2 December 1996	1.87 m (6 ft 2 in)	AS Police	(Mali)
PF	99	Boubacar Sidibe	26 – 8 September 1994	2.06 m (6 ft 9 in)	Alicante	(Spain)

Head coach

- (Mali) Boubacar Kanouté

Assistant coach(es)

- (Mali) Zoumana Coulibaly

Legend

- Club – describes last
  club before the tournament
- Age – describes age
  on 24 August 2021

=== Nigeria ===
Nigeria men's national basketball team roster
Players
Coaches

Pos.	No.	Name	Age – Date of birth	Height	Club	Ctr.
PG	0	Jordan Ogundiran	24 – 30 November 1996	1.80 m (5 ft 11 in)	Kamza	(Albania)
G	3	Ben Emelogu	26 – 24 November 1994	1.96 m (6 ft 5 in)	Rouen	(France)
G	4	Daniel Utomi	24 – 7 March 1997	1.98 m (6 ft 6 in)	Vichy-Clermont	(France)
F	5	Emmanuel Omogbo	26 – 28 May 1995	2.03 m (6 ft 8 in)	APOEL	(Cyprus)
PG	11	Ikenna Ndugba	23 – 11 June 1998	1.83 m (6 ft 0 in)	Elon Phoenix	(United States)
G	12	Ibe Agu	24 – 2 May 1997	2.01 m (6 ft 7 in)	ABC Fighters	(Ivory Coast)
PG	13	Jeremiah Mordi	28 – 7 January 1993	1.94 m (6 ft 4 in)	Caen	(France)
F	14	Tarekeyi Edogi	27 – 21 February 1994	2.03 m (6 ft 8 in)	Paulus Pärnu	(Estonia)
C	15	Victor Koko	28 – 14 December 1992	2.06 m (6 ft 9 in)	Rivers Hoopers	(Nigeria)
C	18	Celestine Nwafor	27 – 16 March 1994	2.09 m (6 ft 10 in)	Kano Pillars BC	(Nigeria)
PG	22	Ikechukwu Benjamin	24 – 14 June 1997	1.93 m (6 ft 4 in)	Rivers Hoopers	(Nigeria)
PF	31	Stephen Domingo	26 – 9 May 1995	2.01 m (6 ft 7 in)	Free agent

Head coach

- (United States) Mike Brown

Assistant coach(es)

- (United States) Alan Major
- (United States) Luke Loucks

Legend

- Club – describes last
  club before the competition
- Age – describes age
  on 24 August 2021

== Group D ==
=== Cameroon ===
Cameroon men's national basketball team roster
Players
Coaches

Pos.	No.	Name	Age – Date of birth	Height	Club	Ctr.
PG	7	Gedeon Pitard	32 – 7 February 1989	1.88 m (6 ft 2 in)	Antibes Sharks	(France)
PG	8	Samir Gbetkom	23 – 24 March 1998	1.91 m (6 ft 3 in)	Vichy-Clermont	(France)
SG	9	Jérémy Nzeulie	30 – 15 February 1991	1.88 m (6 ft 2 in)	Boulazac Dordogne	(France)
G	11	Frank Tchoubaye	29 – 15 April 1992	1.98 m (6 ft 6 in)	Souffelweyersheim	(France)
G	12	Aristide Mouaha	21 – 18 August 2000	1.93 m (6 ft 4 in)	Latina	(Italy)
PF	13	Williams Narace	24 – 17 March 1997	2.03 m (6 ft 8 in)	Le Mans	(France)
SF	15	Arnold Kome	28 – 11 September 1992	1.95 m (6 ft 5 in)	FAP	(Cameroon)
SG	24	D. J. Strawberry	36 – 15 June 1985	1.98 m (6 ft 6 in)	Murcia	(Spain)
PF	26	Philippe Bayehe	21 – 16 October 1999	2.06 m (6 ft 9 in)	Cantù	(Italy)
F	34	Rodrigue Andela	22 – 2 April 1999	2.02 m (6 ft 8 in)	Oregon State Beavers	(United States)
PF	35	Kenneth Kadji	33 – 19 May 1988	2.11 m (6 ft 11 in)	BCM Gravelines-Dunkerque	(France)

Head coach

- (Cameroon) Lazare Adingono

Assistant coach(es)

- (Cameroon) Alfred Aboya

Legend

- Club – describes last
  club before the competition
- Age – describes age
  on 24 August 2021

=== Senegal ===
Senegal men's national basketball team roster
Players
Coaches

Pos.	No.	Name	Age – Date of birth	Height	Club	Ctr.
SG	0	Brancou Badio	22 – 17 February 1999	1.88 m (6 ft 2 in)	FC Barcelona	(Spain)
PF	1	Maurice Ndour	29 – 18 June 1992	2.06 m (6 ft 9 in)	Rytas	(Lithuania)
SG	2	Cheikh Bamba Diallo	25 – 15 March 1996	1.90 m (6 ft 3 in)	AS Douanes	(Senegal)
G	6	Mamadou Faye	27 – 25 September 1993	1.96 m (6 ft 5 in)	AS Douanes	(Senegal)
F	7	Pape Moustapha Diop	25 – 1 January 1996	2.02 m (6 ft 8 in)	DUC Dakar	(Senegal)
C	8	Malik Dime	28 – 6 October 1992	2.10 m (6 ft 11 in)	Andorra	(Andorra)
SG	9	Alga Ndiaye	22 – 16 February 1999	2.01 m (6 ft 7 in)	Ryerson Rams	(Canada)
C	12	Boubacar Toure	25 – 31 December 1995	2.13 m (7 ft 0 in)	Chorale Roanne	(France)
C	14	Gorgui Dieng	31 – 18 January 1990	2.11 m (6 ft 11 in)	Atlanta Hawks	(United States)
C	15	Youssou Ndoye	30 – 15 July 1991	2.12 m (6 ft 11 in)	Real Betis	(Spain)
SG	20	Pierriá Henry	28 – 20 January 1993	1.93 m (6 ft 4 in)	Fenerbahçe	(Turkey)
C	28	Ibrahima Faye	24 – 10 January 1997	2.09 m (6 ft 10 in)	Monaco	(France)

Head coach

- (Senegal) Boniface Ndong

Assistant coach(es)

- (Senegal) Ngagne Diop
- (Senegal) Mamadou Gueye

Legend

- Club – describes last
  club before the competition
- Age – describes age
  on 24 August 2021

=== South Sudan ===
South Sudan men's national basketball team roster
Players
Coaches

Pos.	No.	Name	Age – Date of birth	Height	Club	Ctr.
PG	0	Teny Bak Puot	30 – 1 January 1991	1.75 m (5 ft 9 in)	Waverley Falcons	(Australia)
PF	2	Nyang Wek	24 – 3 September 1996	1.96 m (6 ft 5 in)	Free agent
PG	4	Mareng Gatkuoth	21 – 10 September 1999	1.95 m (6 ft 5 in)	Montana State Bobcats	(United States)
SG	5	Deng Junior Ring	24 – 26 March 1997	1.98 m (6 ft 6 in)	Hawaii Rainbow Warriors	(United States)
SG	6	Dhieu Abwok Deing	19 – 28 August 2001	1.92 m (6 ft 4 in)	UTSA Roadrunners	(United States)
SF	8	Kuany Kuany	27 – 8 July 1994	1.96 m (6 ft 5 in)	Sandringham Sabres	(Australia)
SF	9	Mathiang Muo	34 – 4 March 1987	1.98 m (6 ft 6 in)	Geraldton Buccaneers	(Australia)
PF	10	Makuei Puondak	27 – 1 January 1994	2.03 m (6 ft 8 in)	Círculo Gijón	(Spain)
C	12	Deng Acuoth	24 – 2 October 1996	2.11 m (6 ft 11 in)	Ballarat Miners	(Australia)
C	15	Deng Mabior	24 – 15 April 1997	2.18 m (7 ft 2 in)	AD Torreforta	(Spain)
PG	20	Anyiarbany Makoi	21 – 3 July 2000	1.93 m (6 ft 4 in)	Lee Runnin' Rebels	(United States)
C	21	Koch Bar	24 – 15 September 1996	2.11 m (6 ft 11 in)	Værløse Blue Hawks	(Denmark)

Head coach

- (United States) Royal Ivey

Assistant coach(es)

- (United States) Joe Mantegna
- (United States) Fortune Solomon

Legend

- Club – describes last
  club before the competition
- Age – describes age
  on 24 August 2021

=== Uganda ===
Uganda men's national basketball team roster
Players
Coaches

Pos.	No.	Name	Age – Date of birth	Height	Club	Ctr.
G	2	Adam Seiko	23 – 27 February 1998	1.90 m (6 ft 3 in)	San Diego State Aztecs	(United States)
SG	4	Tonny Drileba	27 – 19 December 1993	1.83 m (6 ft 0 in)	City Oilers	(Uganda)
PG	5	Jimmy Enabu	33 – 17 April 1988	1.82 m (6 ft 0 in)	City Oilers	(Uganda)
SG	6	Robinson Opong	32 – 10 May 1989	1.90 m (6 ft 3 in)	CD Estela	(Spain)
G	7	Keiron Zziwa	23 – 7 November 1997	1.82 m (6 ft 0 in)	Manitoba Bisons	(Canada)
PG	8	Ben Komakech	35 – 28 April 1986	1.80 m (5 ft 11 in)	City Oilers	(Uganda)
C	9	Deng Geu	24 – 1 January 1997	2.06 m (6 ft 9 in)	Rasta Vechta	(Germany)
PF	10	James Okello	29 – 26 January 1992	1.93 m (6 ft 4 in)	City Oilers	(Uganda)
PF	11	Titus Odeke	22 – 29 December 1998	2.08 m (6 ft 10 in)	Uganda Christian University	(Uganda)
SF	12	Eric Rwahwire	25 – 21 February 1996	2.01 m (6 ft 7 in)	Hamilton Honey Badgers	(Canada)
SF	13	Ish Wainright	26 – 12 September 1994	1.96 m (6 ft 5 in)	Toronto Raptors	(Canada)
F	15	Arthur Kaluma	19 – 1 March 2002	2.00 m (6 ft 7 in)	Creighton Bluejays	(United States)

Head coach

- (United States) (Uganda) Coach George Galanopoulos

Assistant coach(es)

- (Uganda) Mandy Juruni
- (Uganda) Andrew Senyondwa

Legend

- Club – describes last
  club before the competition
- Age – describes age
  on 24 August 2021
