= 2023 FIBA Basketball World Cup qualification (Africa) =

2023 FIBA Basketball World Cup
African Qualification

Tournament details
- Dates: 22 November 2021 – 26 February 2023
- Teams: 16

Official website
- African qualifiers website

The 2023 FIBA Basketball World Cup qualification for the FIBA Africa region, began in November 2021 and concluded in February 2023. The process determined the five African teams that would participate at the 2023 FIBA World Cup.

== Format ==
The qualification structure is as follows:

- First round: 16 teams were divided into four groups of four teams and played a double round-robin system (home-and-away or two tournaments at a single venue). The three best-placed teams from each group advanced to the second round.
- Second round: 12 teams were divided into two groups of six teams. Each group was formed from teams advancing from the four first round groups. All results from the previous round were carried over. The two-best placed teams from each group and the best third-placed team qualified for the World Cup.

== Entrants ==
The 16 teams that qualified for AfroBasket 2021 participated in the first round of the 2023 FIBA Basketball World Cup African qualifiers.

- Angola
- Cameroon
- Cape Verde
- Central African Republic
- DR Congo
- Egypt
- Guinea
- Ivory Coast
- Kenya
- Mali
- Nigeria
- Rwanda
- Senegal
- South Sudan
- Tunisia
- Uganda

== Draw ==
The draw for the first round was held on 31 August 2021 in Mies, Switzerland.

=== Seeding ===
Seedings were announced on 30 August 2021. Teams were seeded based on FIBA rankings. Teams from pots 1 and 4 were drawn to Groups A and B. Teams from pots 2 and 3 were drawn to Groups C and D. Teams from pots 5 and 6 were drawn across the four groups.

Pot 1
Team	Pos
Nigeria	23
Tunisia	30

Pot 2
Team	Pos
Angola	33
Senegal	36

Pot 3
Team	Pos
Ivory Coast	46
Egypt	62

Pot 4
Team	Pos
Cameroon	63
Mali	75

Pot 5
Team	Pos
Central African Republic	76
DR Congo	81
Uganda	90
South Sudan	94

Pot 6
Team	Pos
Rwanda	95
Cape Verde	100
Kenya	111
Guinea	118

== First round ==
Due to the COVID-19 pandemic, the November window was played in a single venue. The same was done for the February and July windows.

All times are local.

=== Group A ===
Pos	Team	Pld	W	L	PF	PA	PD	Pts	Qualification
1	Cape Verde	4	3	1	319	296	+23	7	Second round
2	Nigeria	4	2	2	327	299	+28	6	Second round
3	Uganda	4	1	3	296	347	−51	5	Second round
4	Mali (Note: After Mali forfeited two games, they were disqualified and their results nullified.)	0	0	0	0	0	0	0	Disqualified

Source: FIBA
Rules for classification: 1) Points; 2) Head-to-head results; 3) Points difference; 4) Points scored.
Notes:

26 November 2021	Cape Verde	79–71	Nigeria	Benguela, Angola
11:00	Scoring by quarter: 18–20, 16–15, 17–20, 28–16
	Pts: Correia 15; Rebs: three players 7 Asts: Correia 4	Boxscore	Pts: Diogu, Omoerah 13; Rebs: Diogu, Uzoh 8 Asts: Uzoh 11	Arena: Pavilhão Acácias Rubras; Attendance: 50; Referees: Hassane Kamaté (CIV), Wael Mostafa (EGY), Babacar Gueye (SEN)

26 November 2021	Mali	Annulled	Uganda

27 November 2021	Nigeria	Annulled	Mali

27 November 2021	Uganda	77–74	Cape Verde	Benguela, Angola
20:00	Scoring by quarter: 12–14, 19–18, 27–27, 19–15
	Pts: Davies 27; Rebs: Davies 10; Asts: Drileba, Opong 4	Boxscore	Pts: Xavier 15; Rebs: I. Almeida, K. Gomes 8 Asts: I. Almeida 4	Arena: Pavilhão Acácias Rubras; Attendance: 89; Referees: Hassane Kamaté (CIV), Amr Aboollo (EGY), Cherubin Leslie (MRI)

28 November 2021	Cape Verde	Annulled	Mali

28 November 2021	Uganda	69–95	Nigeria	Benguela, Angola
20:00	Scoring by quarter: 18–25, 19–28, 8–14, 24–28
	Pts: Davies 22; Rebs: Opong 9 Asts: Okello, Opong 4	Boxscore	Pts: Diogu 27; Rebs: Diogu 10; Asts: Uzoh 8	Arena: Pavilhão Acácias Rubras; Attendance: 134; Referees: Antonio Bernardo (ANG), Hassane Kamaté (CIV), Babacar Gueye (SEN)

1 July 2022	Nigeria	70–79	Cape Verde	Kigali, Rwanda
12:00	Scoring by quarter: 15–14, 11–25, 21–17, 23–23
	Pts: Mekowulu, Ndugba 13; Rebs: Mekowulu 13; Asts: Ndugba 8	Boxscore	Pts: E. Tavares 15; Rebs: I. Almeida, E. Tavares 13; Asts: Almeida 7	Arena: BK Arena; Attendance: 100; Referees: Redouane Darif (MAR), Harouna Maïga (BUR), Silver Houngbed (BEN)

1 July 2022 (Note: The game ended in a forfeit as the Malian team did not show up after protesting over unpaid allowances.)	Uganda	Annulled	Mali

2 July 2022	Mali	Annulled	Nigeria

2 July 2022	Cape Verde	87–78	Uganda	Kigali, Rwanda
15:00	Scoring by quarter: 25–23, 19–20, 18–9, 25–26
	Pts: W. Tavares 22; Rebs: I. Almeida 11; Asts: Mendonça 6	Boxscore	Pts: Wainright 21; Rebs: Kaluma, Opong 5 Asts: Trinquier 5	Arena: BK Arena; Referees: Redouane Darif (MAR), Saber Rezgui (TUN), Jules Djopwouo (CMR)

3 July 2022	Mali	Cancelled	Cape Verde
				Arena: location=

3 July 2022	Nigeria	91–72	Uganda	Kigali, Rwanda
15:00	Scoring by quarter: 20–13, 29–18, 24–24, 18–17
	Pts: Metu 25; Rebs: Metu 10; Asts: Iroegbu 8	Boxscore	Pts: Kaluma 27; Rebs: Wainright 13; Asts: Wainright 6	Arena: BK Arena; Attendance: 2,000; Referees: Harouna Maïga (BUR), Redouane Darif (MAR), Erick Otieno (KEN)

=== Group B ===
Pos	Team	Pld	W	L	PF	PA	PD	Pts	Qualification
1	South Sudan	6	6	0	429	368	+61	12	Second round
2	Tunisia	6	4	2	386	369	+17	10	Second round
3	Cameroon	6	1	5	338	365	−27	7 (Note: Cameroon 109–104 Rwanda)	Second round
4	Rwanda	6	1	5	340	391	−51	7	

Source: FIBA
Rules for classification: 1) Points; 2) Head-to-head results; 3) Points difference; 4) Points scored.
Notes:

25 February 2022	South Sudan	68–56	Rwanda	Dakar, Senegal
12:00	Scoring by quarter: 18–23, 11–8, 23–13, 16–12
	Pts: Kuany 18; Rebs: Acuoth 7 Asts: Makoi 4	Boxscore	Pts: Ndizeye 12; Rebs: Habimana 7 Asts: Gasana 5	Arena: Dakar Arena; Referees: Tonton Banza (COD), Babacar Gueye (SEN), Silver Houngbed (BEN)

25 February 2022	Cameroon	51–55	Tunisia	Dakar, Senegal
21:00	Scoring by quarter: 13–18, 15–16, 12–6, 11–15
	Pts: Mbala 12; Rebs: Moute a Bidias 8 Asts: three players 2	Boxscore	Pts: Abada 25; Rebs: Ben Romdhane 9 Asts: Abada 2	Arena: Dakar Arena; Attendance: 75; Referees: Wael Mostafa (EGY), Harouna Maïga (BUR), Sara El-Sharnouby (EGY)

26 February 2022	Tunisia	64–72	South Sudan	Dakar, Senegal
15:00	Scoring by quarter: 17–21, 18–20, 18–20, 11–11
	Pts: Abada, Chennoufi 13; Rebs: Ben Romdhane 8 Asts: Abada 6	Boxscore	Pts: Omot 20; Rebs: Acuoth 7 Asts: Makoi 6	Arena: Dakar Arena; Attendance: 125; Referees: Tonton Banza (COD), Harouna Maïga (BUR), Silver Houngbed (BEN)

26 February 2022	Rwanda	45–57	Cameroon	Dakar, Senegal
21:00	Scoring by quarter: 12–9, 8–11, 12–11, 13–26
	Pts: Ndizeye 12; Rebs: Gray 9 Asts: four players 1	Boxscore	Pts: Adala 16; Rebs: Bayehe 8 Asts: Gbetkom, Pitard 3	Arena: Dakar Arena; Attendance: 99; Referees: Kingsley Ojeaburu (NGR), Wael Mostafa (EGY), Babacar Gueye (SEN)

27 February 2022	South Sudan	74–68	Cameroon	Dakar, Senegal
15:00	Scoring by quarter: 24–16, 24–18, 13–14, 13–20
	Pts: Makoi 25; Rebs: Makoi, Omot 7 Asts: Makoi 3	Boxscore	Pts: Bayehe 21; Rebs: Eboua 7 Asts: Nzeulie, Mouaha 3	Arena: Dakar Arena; Attendance: 150; Referees: Babacar Gueye (SEN), Wael Mostafa (EGY), Sofiane Si Youcef (ALG)

27 February 2022	Tunisia	65–51	Rwanda	Dakar, Senegal
21:00	Scoring by quarter: 22–16, 16–9, 16–10, 11–16
	Pts: Ben Romdhane 20; Rebs: Saada 10; Asts: El Mabrouk 4	Boxscore	Pts: Gasana 10; Rebs: Habimana 6 Asts: Habimana 2	Arena: Dakar Arena; Attendance: 245; Referees: Tonton Banza (COD), Sara El-Sharnouby (EGY), Claudio Eiuba (ANG)

1 July 2022	Rwanda	63–73	South Sudan	Kigali
18:00	Scoring by quarter: 13–22, 12–20, 23–10, 15–21
	Pts: Mpoyo 15; Rebs: Robeyns 8 Asts: Robeyns 3	Boxscore	Pts: Kuol 16; Rebs: Acuoth 15; Asts: Dech 8	Arena: BK Arena; Referees: Hassane Kamaté (CIV), Kingsley Ojeaburu (NGR), Samuel Shofoluwe (NGR)

1 July 2022	Tunisia	65–54	Cameroon	Kigali, Rwanda
21:00	Scoring by quarter: 20–15, 17–15, 15–15, 13–9
	Pts: Abada, Slimane 11; Rebs: Mejri 9 Asts: Roll 6	Boxscore	Pts: Mbala 12; Rebs: Bayehe 6 Asts: Gbetkom, Mbala 3	Arena: BK Arena; Referees: Youssouf Maiga (MLI), Diallo Mahamadou (MLI), Walelign Gebeto (ETH)

2 July 2022	Cameroon	52–59	Rwanda	Kigali, Rwanda
18:00	Scoring by quarter: 7–19, 8–15, 20–14, 17–11
	Pts: Ateba 19; Rebs: Bayehe 7 Asts: Narace 4	Boxscore	Pts: Robeyns 13; Rebs: Gray, Mpoyo 6 Asts: Gasana 5	Arena: BK Arena; Referees: Hassane Kamaté (CIV), Youssouf Maiga (MLI), Silver Houngbedji (BEN)

2 July 2022	South Sudan	75–61	Tunisia	Kigali, Rwanda
21:00	Scoring by quarter: 14–20, 17–13, 24–15, 20–13
	Pts: Omot 16; Rebs: Acuoth 11; Asts: Dech 8	Boxscore	Pts: Roll 21; Rebs: Mejri 9 Asts: Ben Romdhane 3	Arena: BK Arena; Attendance: 3,000; Referees: Kingsley Ojeaburu (NGR), Diallo Mahamadou (MLI), Samuel Shofoluwe (NGR)

3 July 2022	Rwanda	66–76	Tunisia	Kigali
18:00	Scoring by quarter: 11–16, 18–23, 15–22, 22–15
	Pts: Habimana 14; Rebs: Mpoyo, Nshobozwabyosenumukiza 5 Asts: Nshobozwabyosenumukiza 4	Boxscore	Pts: Mejri, Roll 16; Rebs: Mejri 10; Asts: El Mabrouk 6	Arena: BK Arena; Attendance: 5,000; Referees: Diallo Mahamadou (MLI), Walelign Gebeto (ETH), Kingsley Ojeaburu (NGR)

3 July 2022	Cameroon	55–67	South Sudan	Kigali, Rwanda
21:00	Scoring by quarter: 9–18, 15–16, 22–20, 10–13
	Pts: Adala 12; Rebs: Aboua, Narace 8 Asts: Minlend 3	Boxscore	Pts: Kuol, Omot 17; Rebs: Kuany 9 Asts: Wang 4	Arena: BK Arena; Attendance: 5,000; Referees: Hassane Kamaté (CIV), Youssouf Maiga (MLI), Samuel Shofoluwe (NGR)

=== Group C ===
Pos	Team	Pld	W	L	PF	PA	PD	Pts	Qualification
1	Ivory Coast	6	6	0	442	381	+61	12	Second round
2	Angola	6	4	2	443	364	+79	10	Second round
3	Guinea	6	1	5	381	437	−56	7 (Note: Guinea 132–132 Central African Republic)	Second round
4	Central African Republic	6	1	5	367	451	−84	7	

Source: FIBA
Rules for classification: 1) Points; 2) Head-to-head results; 3) Points difference; 4) Points scored.
Notes:

26 November 2021	Guinea	76–71	Central African Republic	Benguela, Angola
14:00	Scoring by quarter: 16–14, 11–16, 28–22, 21–19
	Pts: Queta 22; Rebs: Queta 13; Asts: Evans 10	Boxscore	Pts: Ganapamo 26; Rebs: Dokossi 12; Asts: Kouguere 4	Arena: Pavilhão Acácias Rubras; Attendance: 112; Referees: Kingsley Ojeaburu (NGR), Arnold Moseya (RSA), Walelign Gebeto (ETH)

26 November 2021	Ivory Coast	57–56	Angola	Benguela, Angola
17:00	Scoring by quarter: 7–20, 13–9, 22–10, 15–17
	Pts: Dadiet, Diabate 15; Rebs: Bah 7 Asts: Diabate 6	Boxscore	Pts: Gakou 9 Rebs: Bango 11; Asts: Domingos 5	Arena: Pavilhão Acácias Rubras; Attendance: 667; Referees: Cherubin Leslie (MRI), Tonton Banza (COD), Amr Aboollo (EGY)

27 November 2021	Central African Republic	64–92	Ivory Coast	Benguela, Angola
11:00	Scoring by quarter: 12–25, 14–22, 16–23, 22–22
	Pts: Grebongo 17; Rebs: Dokossi 10; Asts: three players 2	Boxscore	Pts: Moularé 20; Rebs: Coulibaly, Moularé 7 Asts: Kebe 5	Arena: Pavilhão Acácias Rubras; Attendance: 55; Referees: Wael Mostafa (EGY), Arnold Moseya (RSA), Diallo Mahamadou (MLI)

27 November 2021	Angola	75–59	Guinea	Benguela
17:00	Scoring by quarter: 23–15, 17–19, 18–12, 17–13
	Pts: Manuel 18; Rebs: Bango, Gakou 10; Asts: Domingos, Dundão 4	Boxscore	Pts: Evans 22; Rebs: Conde 7 Asts: Evans 3	Arena: Pavilhão Acácias Rubras; Attendance: 112; Referees: Walelign Gebeto (ETH), Jean Ruhamiriza (RWA), Silver Houngbedji (BEN)

28 November 2021	Ivory Coast	80–69	Guinea	Benguela, Angola
11:00	Scoring by quarter: 16–21, 23–10, 21–17, 20–21
	Pts: Fofana 16; Rebs: three players 7 Asts: Diabate 8	Boxscore	Pts: Queta 19; Rebs: Queta 8 Asts: Evans 10	Arena: Pavilhão Acácias Rubras; Attendance: 112; Referees: Amr Aboollo (EGY), Arnaud Kom Njilo (CMR), Arnold Moseya (RSA)

28 November 2021	Central African Republic	48–78	Angola	Benguela, Angola
17:00	Scoring by quarter: 11–20, 3–10, 19–17, 15–31
	Pts: Ngoy 15; Rebs: Djimrabaye, Kouguere 9 Asts: six players 1	Boxscore	Pts: Dundão 18; Rebs: Bango, Gakou 7 Asts: Domingos 6	Arena: Pavilhão Acácias Rubras; Attendance: 224; Referees: Wael Mostafa (EGY), Walelign Gebeto (ETH), Diallo Mahamadou (MLI)

1 July 2022	Central African Republic	61–56	Guinea	Abidjan, Ivory Coast
16:00	Scoring by quarter: 13–10, 15–14, 25–10, 8–22
	Pts: Djimrabaye 15; Rebs: Kouguere 10; Asts: Kougere, Zachée 4	Boxscore	Pts: Sy 12; Rebs: Sy 12; Asts: C. Condé, Kaba 3	Arena: Palais des Sports de Treichville; Attendance: 0 Referees: Jean Ruhamiriza (RWA), Babacar Gueye (SEN), Arnaud Kom Njilo (CMR)

1 July 2022	Angola	73–75	Ivory Coast	Abidjan, Ivory Coast
19:00	Scoring by quarter: 11–13, 25–23, 20–27, 17–12
	Pts: Dundão 20; Rebs: Bango 11; Asts: Dundão 4	Boxscore	Pts: Moularé 25; Rebs: Bah, Edi 6 Asts: Fofana 4	Arena: Palais des Sports de Treichville; Referees: Tonton Banza (COD), Wael Mostafa (EGY), Didier Gaga (RWA)

2 July 2022	Guinea	65–85	Angola	Abidjan, Ivory Coast
16:00	Scoring by quarter: 15–22, 14–18, 16–27, 20–18
	Pts: Kaba 13; Rebs: Sy 9 Asts: Sy 5	Boxscore	Pts: Monteiro 19; Rebs: Bango 7 Asts: Dundão 7	Arena: Palais des Sports de Treichville; Referees: Tonton Banza (COD), Guy Sani (CMR), Babacar Gueye (SEN)

2 July 2022	Ivory Coast	73–63	Central African Republic	Abidjan
19:00	Scoring by quarter: 16–19, 14–16, 24–11, 19–17
	Pts: Dadiet 19; Rebs: Costello 10; Asts: Costello 5	Boxscore	Pts: Grebongo 17; Rebs: Djimrabaye 9 Asts: Kouguere 4	Arena: Palais des Sports de Treichville; Attendance: 3,562; Referees: Wael Mostafa (EGY), Didier Gaga (RWA), Jean Ruhamiriza (RWA)

3 July 2022	Angola	76–60	Central African Republic	Abidjan, Ivory Coast
16:00	Scoring by quarter: 22–23, 19–15, 15–10, 20–12
	Pts: Gonçalves 15; Rebs: Bango 8 Asts: Domingos 5	Boxscore	Pts: Djimrabaye 20; Rebs: Darlan 10; Asts: Kouguere 4	Arena: Palais des Sports de Treichville; Attendance: 1,100; Referees: Wael Mostafa (EGY), Babacar Gueye (SEN), Guy Sani (CMR)

3 July 2022	Guinea	56–65	Ivory Coast	Abidjan, Ivory Coast
19:00	Scoring by quarter: 19–20, 9–19, 18–14, 10–12
	Pts: Kaba, Sy 10; Rebs: C. Condé 10; Asts: Dramé, Sy 3	Boxscore	Pts: Costello 12; Rebs: Costello 9 Asts: Dadiet 5	Arena: Palais des Sports de Treichville; Attendance: 2,000; Referees: Tonton Banza (COD), Jean Ruhamiriza (RWA), Didier Gaga (RWA)

=== Group D ===
Pos	Team	Pld	W	L	PF	PA	PD	Pts	Qualification
1	Egypt	6	5	1	452	311	+141	11	Second round
2	DR Congo	6	4	2	323	315	+8	10	Second round
3	Senegal	6	3	3	421	376	+45	9	Second round
4	Kenya (Note: As Kenya forfeited one game, they did not receive a point.)	6	0	6	255	449	−194	5	

Source: FIBA
Rules for classification: 1) Points; 2) Head-to-head results; 3) Points difference; 4) Points scored.
Notes:

25 February 2022	Kenya	56–66	DR Congo	Dakar, Senegal
15:00	Scoring by quarter: 17–18, 9–16, 11–13, 19–19
	Pts: Ligare 12; Rebs: Awich 9 Asts: three players 2	Boxscore	Pts: Pwono, Sakho 11; Rebs: Munanga 11; Asts: Mutuale 5	Arena: Dakar Arena; Attendance: 60; Referees: Sofiane Si Youcef (ALG), Amir Taboubi (TUN), Redouane Darif (MAR)

25 February 2022	Senegal	75–57	Egypt	Dakar
18:00	Scoring by quarter: 16–11, 21–15, 14–17, 24–14
	Pts: Diallo 18; Rebs: Ndoye 20; Asts: Badio 7	Boxscore	Pts: Mahmoud 18; Rebs: Mahmoud 9 Asts: Saleh 4	Arena: Dakar Arena; Attendance: 400; Referees: Kingsley Ojeaburu (NGR), Jean Ruhamiriza (RWA), Guy Sani (CMR)

26 February 2022	Egypt	105–51	Kenya	Dakar, Senegal
12:00	Scoring by quarter: 25–9, 21–12, 31–13, 28–17
	Pts: Shehata 17; Rebs: Khalaf 8 Asts: Shehata 5	Boxscore	Pts: Nyakinda 24; Rebs: three players 4 Asts: Ligare, Koranga 2	Arena: Dakar Arena; Attendance: 40; Referees: Guy Sani (CMR), Amir Taboubi (TUN), Redouane Darif (MAR)

26 February 2022	DR Congo	62–57	Senegal	Dakar, Senegal
18:00	Scoring by quarter: 23–15, 12–14, 11–15, 16–13
	Pts: Pwono 14; Rebs: Pwono 6 Asts: Mutuale 6	Boxscore	Pts: Ndiaye, Touré 11; Rebs: Touré 8 Asts: Badio 7	Arena: Dakar Arena; Attendance: 1,000; Referees: Sofiane Si Youcef (ALG), Jean Ruhamiriza (RWA), Claudio Eiuba (ANG)

27 February 2022	Egypt	62–51	DR Congo	Dakar, Senegal
12:00	Scoring by quarter: 13–15, 17–9, 14–9, 18–18
	Pts: Mahmoud 16; Rebs: Mostafa 12; Asts: Saleh 5	Boxscore	Pts: Pwono 16; Rebs: Pwono, Sakho 8 Asts: Mutuale 7	Arena: Dakar Arena; Attendance: 65; Referees: Kingsley Ojeaburu (NGR), Silver Houngbed (BEN), Harouna Maïga (BUR)

27 February 2022	Kenya	55–100	Senegal	Dakar, Senegal
18:00	Scoring by quarter: 10–28, 19–25, 13–21, 13–26
	Pts: Bungei 19; Rebs: Ligare 7 Asts: Ligare 4	Boxscore	Pts: Ndoye 21; Rebs: Ndoye 11; Asts: Badio, Ndiaye 4	Arena: Dakar Arena; Attendance: 2,000; Referees: Jean Ruhamiriza (RWA), Redouane Darif (MAR), Guy Sani (CMR)

1 July 2022 (Note: The game, originally scheduled for 1 July, was cancelled after the Kenyan team could not reach Alexandria in time and counted as a forfeit.)	DR Congo	20–0	Kenya	Alexandria, Egypt
		Boxscore

1 July 2022	Egypt	76–43	Senegal	Alexandria
20:00	Scoring by quarter: 23–10, 15–15, 21–10, 17–8
	Pts: Amin 22; Rebs: Marei 9 Asts: Farag, Marei 4	Boxscore	Pts: Dieng 13; Rebs: Dieng 10; Asts: Diallo 2	Arena: Borg Al Arab Sports Hall; Attendance: 1,000; Referees: Cherubin Leslie (MRI), Yann Davidson (MAD), Claudio Eiuba (ANG)

2 July 2022	Kenya	39–72	Egypt	Alexandria, Egypt
20:00	Scoring by quarter: 8–17, 9–29, 14–15, 8–11
	Pts: Wachira 11; Rebs: Awich 10; Asts: three players 1	Boxscore	Pts: Aboushousha 10; Rebs: Marei 8 Asts: Gendy 6	Arena: Borg Al Arab Sports Hall; Attendance: 300; Referees: Opeyemi Ogunleye (NGR), Claudio Eiuba (ANG), Haytham Ihaqaf (LBY)

2 July 2022	Senegal	60–72	DR Congo	Alexandria, Egypt
22:30	Scoring by quarter: 11–17, 14–10, 11–22, 24–23
	Pts: Dieng 16; Rebs: Dieng 7 Asts: Boissy 4	Boxscore	Pts: Lutete 19; Rebs: Munanga 8 Asts: Mutuale 4	Arena: Borg Al Arab Sports Hall; Attendance: 25; Referees: Yann Davidson (MAD), Cherubin Leslie (MRI), Kouakou Niamien (CIV)

3 July 2022	DR Congo	52–80	Egypt	Alexandria, Egypt
20:00	Scoring by quarter: 16–23, 14–29, 9–11, 13–17
	Pts: Kasibabu 10; Rebs: Kasibabu 7 Asts: Kabongo 2	Boxscore	Pts: Saleh 17; Rebs: Mahmoud 6 Asts: Saleh 3	Arena: Borg Al Arab Sports Hall; Attendance: 500; Referees: Kouakou Niamien (CIV), Cherubin Leslie (MRI), Yann Davidson (MAD)

3 July 2022	Senegal	86–54	Kenya	Alexandria, Egypt
22:30	Scoring by quarter: 20–19, 20–12, 24–12, 22–11
	Pts: Ndiaye 18; Rebs: Dieng 13; Asts: Boissy 7	Boxscore	Pts: Awich 14; Rebs: Awich 12; Asts: five players 1	Arena: Borg Al Arab Sports Hall; Attendance: 0 Referees: Haytham Ihaqaf (LBY), Claudio Eiuba (ANG), Opeyemi Ogunleye (NGR)

== Second round ==
In the second round, the top three teams from each group were placed in a group with three other top teams. Group A was paired with Group C, forming Group E and Group B with Group D, forming Group F. In Group F all results from the first round, were carried over to the second round. In contrary, due to the disqualification of Mali from Group A, Group E results from the first round against last ranked team of Group B (Central African Republic) were disregarded.

The matches in each window were played in a single venue.

All times are local.

=== Group E ===
Pos	Team	Pld	W	L	PF	PA	PD	Pts	Qualification
1	Ivory Coast	10	8	2	739	664	+75	18 (Note: Ivory Coast 2–0 Angola)	2023 FIBA Basketball World Cup
2	Angola	10	8	2	735	618	+117	18	2023 FIBA Basketball World Cup
3	Cape Verde	10	6	4	735	700	+35	16	2023 FIBA Basketball World Cup
4	Nigeria	10	5	5	742	704	+38	15	
5	Guinea	10	2	8	660	715	−55	12	
6	Uganda	10	1	9	647	857	−210	11	

Source: FIBA
Rules for classification: 1) Points; 2) Head-to-head results; 3) Points difference; 4) Points scored.
Notes:

26 August 2022	Guinea	48–65	Cape Verde	Abidjan, Ivory Coast
13:00	Scoring by quarter: 11–21, 17–13, 6–17, 14–14
	Pts: Sy 16; Rebs: M. Keita 8 Asts: Diaby 3	Boxscore	Pts: E. Tavares 15; Rebs: E. Tavares 13; Asts: I. Almeida, E. Tavares 4	Arena: Palais des Sports de Treichville; Attendance: 100; Referees: Tonton Banza (COD), Saber Rezgui (TUN), Walelign Gebeto (ETH)

26 August 2022	Angola	84–62	Uganda	Abidjan, Ivory Coast
16:00	Scoring by quarter: 26–12, 30–15, 14–13, 14–22
	Pts: Fernando 16; Rebs: Bango 7 Asts: Gonçalves 7	Boxscore	Pts: Geu 17; Rebs: Wainright 8 Asts: Komagum, Trinquier 3	Arena: Palais des Sports de Treichville; Attendance: 1,500; Referees: Harouna Maïga (BUR), Babacar Gueye (SEN), Guy Sani (CMR)

26 August 2022	Ivory Coast	78–66	Nigeria	Abidjan
19:00	Scoring by quarter: 14–14, 28–22, 18–16, 18–14
	Pts: Fofana 25; Rebs: Fofana 11; Asts: Diabate, Kebe 4	Boxscore	Pts: Okogie 23; Rebs: Metu 11; Asts: Iroegbu 3	Arena: Palais des Sports de Treichville; Attendance: 4,500; Referees: Cherubin Leslie (MRI), Amr Aboollo (EGY), Arnold Moseya (RSA)

27 August 2022	Cape Verde	58–65	Angola	Abidjan, Ivory Coast
13:00	Scoring by quarter: 14–14, 22–14, 9–16, 13–21
	Pts: J. Almeida 12; Rebs: E. Tavares 16; Asts: I. Almeida 3	Boxscore	Pts: Bango 13; Rebs: Fernando 8 Asts: three players 2	Arena: Palais des Sports de Treichville; Attendance: 100; Referees: Cherubin Leslie (MRI), Youssouf Maiga (MLI), Arnold Moseya (RSA)

27 August 2022	Nigeria	89–70	Guinea	Abidjan, Ivory Coast
16:00	Scoring by quarter: 24–15, 20–20, 21–15, 6–10
	Pts: Egekeze 14; Rebs: Metu 8 Asts: Okogie 6	Boxscore	Pts: Diaby 17; Rebs: T. Keita 5 Asts: Diaby 4	Arena: Palais des Sports de Treichville; Attendance: 1,500; Referees: Amr Aboollo (EGY), Walelign Gebeto (ETH), Didier Gaga (RWA)

27 August 2022	Uganda	80–91	Ivory Coast	Abidjan, Ivory Coast
19:00	Scoring by quarter: 19–27, 31–19, 13–18, 17–27
	Pts: Opong 18; Rebs: Wainright 7 Asts: Enabu 5	Boxscore	Pts: Poythress 24; Rebs: Konate 9 Asts: Diabate 11	Arena: Palais des Sports de Treichville; Attendance: 3,500; Referees: Tonton Banza (COD), Mbaye Seye (SEN), Guy Sani (CMR)

28 August 2022	Angola	70–67	Nigeria	Abidjan, Ivory Coast
13:00	Scoring by quarter: 18–16, 9–13, 23–16, 20–22
	Pts: Bango, Gonçalves 12; Rebs: Fernando 6 Asts: Dundão 3	Boxscore	Pts: Egekeze 18; Rebs: Metu 10; Asts: Okogie 3	Arena: Palais des Sports de Treichville; Attendance: 225; Referees: Amr Aboollo (EGY), Youssouf Maiga (MLI), Mbaye Seye (SEN)

28 August 2022	Guinea	76–69	Uganda	Abidjan, Ivory Coast
16:00	Scoring by quarter: 20–15, 11–18, 16–18, 29–18
	Pts: Evans 32; Rebs: Condé 12; Asts: Evans 6	Boxscore	Pts: Opong 20; Rebs: Geu 10; Asts: Enabu 4	Arena: Palais des Sports de Treichville; Attendance: 350; Referees: Saber Rezgui (TUN), Guy Sani (CMR), Arnold Moseya (RSA)

28 August 2022	Ivory Coast	77–69	Cape Verde	Abidjan
19:00	Scoring by quarter: 16–14, 23–8, 26–24, 12–23
	Pts: Konaté, Poythress 16; Rebs: Poythress 7 Asts: Dadiet, Diabate 5	Boxscore	Pts: E. Tavares 23; Rebs: E. Tavares 14; Asts: I. Almeida 6	Arena: Palais des Sports de Treichville; Attendance: 4,000; Referees: Tonton Banza (COD), Cherubin Leslie (MRI), Walelign Gebeto (ETH)

24 February 2023	Nigeria	72–63	Ivory Coast	Luanda, Angola
14:00	Scoring by quarter: 16–15, 14–19, 23–14, 19–15
	Pts: Ezeh 18; Rebs: Otobo 13; Asts: Afuwape 5	Boxscore	Pts: Dally 19; Rebs: Fofana 10; Asts: Diabate 11	Arena: Pavilhão Multiusos de Luanda; Attendance: 678; Referees: Kerem Baki (TUR), Wael Mostafa (EGY), Arnold Moseya (RSA)

24 February 2023	Cape Verde	78–70	Guinea	Luanda, Angola
16:30	Scoring by quarter: 13–24, 31–13, 18–24, 16–9
	Pts: W. Tavares 20; Rebs: Gomes 9 Asts: W. Tavares 5	Boxscore	Pts: C. Condé 23; Rebs: C. Condé 12; Asts: Sy 4	Arena: Pavilhão Multiusos de Luanda; Attendance: 200; Referees: Tonton Banza (COD), Arnaud Kom Njilo (CMR), Jean Ruhamiriza (RWA)

24 February 2023	Uganda	49–82	Angola	Luanda, Angola
19:00	Scoring by quarter: 9–17, 19–17, 10–25, 11–23
	Pts: Baale 15; Rebs: Kizito, Okello 6 Asts: Enabu, Kizito 4	Boxscore	Pts: Dundão 16; Rebs: Domingos 5 Asts: Domingos 5	Arena: Pavilhão Multiusos de Luanda; Attendance: 3,456; Referees: Cherubin Leslie (MRI), Mbaye Seye (SEN), Youssouf Maiga (MLI)

25 February 2023	Guinea	59–62	Nigeria	Luanda, Angola
14:00	Scoring by quarter: 13–13, 22–18, 13–8, 11–23
	Pts: C. Condé 25; Rebs: Kaba 11; Asts: Sy 8	Boxscore	Pts: Darambola, Ezeh 16; Rebs: Otobo 6 Asts: Agu, Afuwape 3	Arena: Pavilhão Multiusos de Luanda; Attendance: 100; Referees: Wael Mostafa (EGY), Cherubin Leslie (MRI), Sara El-Sharnouby (EGY)

25 February 2023	Ivory Coast	89–44	Uganda	Luanda, Angola
16:30	Scoring by quarter: 31–10, 19–11, 17–13, 22–10
	Pts: Dieng 23; Rebs: Koné 7 Asts: Dieng 8	Boxscore	Pts: Kizito 11; Rebs: Mugerwa 10; Asts: Odeke, Okello 2	Arena: Pavilhão Multiusos de Luanda; Attendance: 3,455; Referees: Arnaud Kom Njilo (CMR), Arnold Moseya (RSA), Babacar Gueye (SEN)

25 February 2023	Angola	80–67	Cape Verde	Luanda
19:00	Scoring by quarter: 20–18, 23–18, 21–16, 16–15
	Pts: Dundão 23; Rebs: Dundão 6 Asts: Dundão 7	Boxscore	Pts: I. Almeida, B. Gomes 14; Rebs: E. Tavares 15; Asts: three players 2	Arena: Pavilhão Multiusos de Luanda; Attendance: 150; Referees: Kerem Baki (TUR), Tonton Banza (COD), Jean Ruhamiriza (RWA)

26 February 2023	Uganda	47–88	Guinea	Luanda, Angola
13:00	Scoring by quarter: 16–25, 20–20, 9–25, 2–18
	Pts: Odeke 12; Rebs: Okello 9 Asts: Enabu, Okello 3	Boxscore	Pts: C. Condé 25; Rebs: C. Condé 10; Asts: Sy 4	Arena: Pavilhão Multiusos de Luanda; Attendance: 543; Referees: Babacar Gueye (SEN), Claudio Eiuba (ANG), Mbaye Seye (SEN)

26 February 2023	Cape Verde	79–64	Ivory Coast	Luanda, Angola
15:30	Scoring by quarter: 14–24, 28–6, 23–21, 14–13
	Pts: I. Almeida 20; Rebs: I. Almeida, E. Tavares 5 Asts: E. Tavares, Xavier 3	Boxscore	Pts: Diabate 12; Rebs: three players 5 Asts: Diabate 10	Arena: Pavilhão Multiusos de Luanda; Attendance: 57; Referees: Wael Mostafa (EGY), Arnold Moseya (RSA), Cherubin Leslie (MRI)

26 February 2023	Nigeria	59–65	Angola	Luanda, Angola
18:00	Scoring by quarter: 15–18, 14–18, 11–19, 19–10
	Pts: Agu 26; Rebs: Anthony 7 Asts: Anaiye 3	Boxscore	Pts: Kokila 10; Rebs: Dó 8 Asts: three players 3	Arena: Pavilhão Multiusos de Luanda; Attendance: 7,890; Referees: Kerem Baki (TUR), Arnaud Kom Njilo (CMR), Youssouf Maiga (MLI)

=== Group F ===
Pos	Team	Pld	W	L	PF	PA	PD	Pts	Qualification
1	South Sudan	12	11	1	943	773	+170	23	2023 FIBA Basketball World Cup
2	Egypt	12	8	4	881	766	+115	20	2023 FIBA Basketball World Cup
3	Senegal	12	7	5	870	792	+78	19	
4	Tunisia	12	6	6	772	750	+22	18	
5	DR Congo	12	5	7	684	779	−95	17	
6	Cameroon	12	4	8	773	818	−45	16	

Source: FIBA
Rules for classification: 1) Points; 2) Head-to-head results; 3) Points difference; 4) Points scored.

26 August 2022	DR Congo	69–71	Cameroon	Monastir, Tunisia
16:30	Scoring by quarter: 5–21, 15–13, 23–18, 26–19
	Pts: Kuminga 18; Rebs: Ntambwe 7 Asts: Kabongo 3	Boxscore	Pts: Minlend Jr. 17; Rebs: Minlend Jr. 8 Asts: three players 3	Arena: Mohamed-Mzali Sports Hall; Attendance: 100; Referees: Hassane Kamaté (CIV), Wael Mostafa (EGY), Diallo Mahamadou (MLI)

26 August 2022	Egypt	67–61	Tunisia	Monastir, Tunisia
19:30	Scoring by quarter: 13–21, 20–12, 21–10, 13–18
	Pts: Saleh 18; Rebs: Marei 13; Asts: Mahmoud 5	Boxscore	Pts: Mejri 19; Rebs: Ben Romdhane 10; Asts: Ben Romdhane, El Mabrouk 4	Arena: Mohamed-Mzali Sports Hall; Attendance: 2,500; Referees: Antonio Bernardo (ANG), Yann Davidson (MAD), Jean Ruhamiriza (RWA)

26 August 2022	Senegal	69–66	South Sudan	Monastir, Tunisia
22:30	Scoring by quarter: 17–11, 7–16, 18–16, 27–23
	Pts: Dieng 17; Rebs: Dieng 15; Asts: Badio 8	Boxscore	Pts: Kuol 16; Rebs: Acuoth 9 Asts: Dech 5	Arena: Mohamed-Mzali Sports Hall; Attendance: 200; Referees: Kingsley Ojeaburu (NGR), Sofiane Si Youcef (ALG), Redouane Darif (MAR)

27 August 2022	Cameroon	74–86	Egypt	Monastir, Tunisia
16:30	Scoring by quarter: 19–21, 25–26, 4–19, 26–20
	Pts: Ateba 20; Rebs: Awana 6 Asts: Lee 7	Boxscore	Pts: Marei 19; Rebs: Marei 9 Asts: Gendy, Mahmoud 5	Arena: Mohamed-Mzali Sports Hall; Attendance: 100; Referees: Yann Davidson (MAD), Redouane Darif (MAR), Silver Houngbed (BEN)

27 August 2022	Tunisia	63–73	Senegal	Monastir
19:30	Scoring by quarter: 23–14, 17–19, 10–21, 13–19
	Pts: Roll, Toumi 14; Rebs: Lahiani 8 Asts: Ben Romdhane 5	Boxscore	Pts: Dieng 20; Rebs: I. Faye 13; Asts: Badio 5	Arena: Mohamed-Mzali Sports Hall; Attendance: 2,500; Referees: Antonio Bernardo (ANG), Kingsley Ojeaburu (NGR), Jean Ruhamiriza (RWA)

27 August 2022	South Sudan	101–58	DR Congo	Monastir, Tunisia
22:30	Scoring by quarter: 25–4, 24–16, 22–25, 30–13
	Pts: Deng 19; Rebs: Bar 7 Asts: Bar 4	Boxscore	Pts: Kuminga 16; Rebs: Munanga 7 Asts: Kuminga 4	Arena: Mohamed-Mzali Sports Hall; Attendance: 150; Referees: Sofiane Si Youcef (ALG), Opeyemi Ogunleye (NGR), Haytham Ihaqaf (LBY)

28 August 2022	Senegal	90–71	Cameroon	Monastir, Tunisia
16:30	Scoring by quarter: 27–20, 21–15, 18–24, 24–12
	Pts: Badio 22; Rebs: Dieng 13; Asts: Badio 8	Boxscore	Pts: Mbala 13; Rebs: Mbala 11; Asts: Lee 6	Arena: Mohamed-Mzali Sports Hall; Attendance: 100; Referees: Sofiane Si Youcef (ALG), Redouane Darif (MAR), Haytham Ihaqaf (LBY)

28 August 2022	DR Congo	45–57	Tunisia	Monastir, Tunisia
19:30	Scoring by quarter: 12–26, 6–11, 13–11, 14–9
	Pts: Kuminga 19; Rebs: Kuminga 8 Asts: three players 2	Boxscore	Pts: Abada 13; Rebs: Ghyaza, Hdidane 6 Asts: Abada 7	Arena: Mohamed-Mzali Sports Hall; Attendance: 1,000; Referees: Kingsley Ojeaburu (NGR), Diallo Mahamadou (MLI), Yann Davidson (MAD)

28 August 2022	Egypt	65–85	South Sudan	Monastir, Tunisia
22:30	Scoring by quarter: 14–25, 20–21, 21–24, 10–15
	Pts: Amin 18; Rebs: Mahmoud 7 Asts: Saleh 6	Boxscore	Pts: Dech 18; Rebs: Acuil 10; Asts: Dech, Omot 5	Arena: Mohamed-Mzali Sports Hall; Attendance: 150; Referees: Hassane Kamaté (CIV), Antonio Bernardo (ANG), Silver Houngbed (BEN)

24 February 2023	Cameroon	85–56	DR Congo	Alexandria, Egypt
14:00	Scoring by quarter: 21–8, 15–21, 27–14, 22–13
	Pts: Ateba, Minlend Jr. 15; Rebs: Gbetkom 6 Asts: Hill, Nyama 4	Boxscore	Pts: Nganga 15; Rebs: Shonganya 8 Asts: Balume 6	Arena: Kamal Shalaby Hall; Referees: Hassane Kamaté (CIV), Antonio Bernardo (ANG), Walelign Gebeto (ETH)

24 February 2023	South Sudan	83–75	Senegal	Alexandria, Egypt
16:30	Scoring by quarter: 22–21, 23–23, 14–19, 24–12
	Pts: Omot 26; Rebs: Dech 9 Asts: Dech 6	Boxscore	Pts: Badio 29; Rebs: Ndoye 7 Asts: Badio 6	Arena: Kamal Shalaby Hall; Referees: Didier Gaga (RWA), Yann Davidson (MAD), Sofiane Si Youcef (ALG)

24 February 2023	Tunisia	67–71	Egypt	Alexandria, Egypt
19:00	Scoring by quarter: 17–17, 14–18, 14–20, 22–16
	Pts: Ben Romdhane 22; Rebs: Ben Romdhane 12; Asts: Abada 4	Boxscore	Pts: Saleh 23; Rebs: Mahmoud 12; Asts: Gendy, Mahmoud 3	Arena: Kamal Shalaby Hall; Attendance: 300; Referees: Andris Aunkrogers (LAT), Diallo Mahamadou (MLI), Haytham Ihaqaf (LBY)

25 February 2023	DR Congo	61–82	South Sudan	Alexandria, Egypt
14:00	Scoring by quarter: 21–20, 12–21, 10–20, 18–21
	Pts: Kamba 18; Rebs: Kande, Shonganya 5 Asts: Mutuale 8	Boxscore	Pts: Deng 18; Rebs: five players 4 Asts: Wang 9	Arena: Kamal Shalaby Hall; Referees: Antonio Bernardo (ANG), Amr Aboollo (EGY), Yann Davidson (MAD)

25 February 2023	Senegal	53–70	Tunisia	Alexandria, Egypt
16:30	Scoring by quarter: 13–13, 16–17, 13–23, 11–17
	Pts: Sambe 14; Rebs: N'Diaye 7 Asts: Badio 5	Boxscore	Pts: Abada 26; Rebs: Ben Romdhane 10; Asts: three players 3	Arena: Kamal Shalaby Hall; Referees: Andris Aunkrogers (LAT), Sofiane Si Youcef (ALG), Didier Gaga (RWA)

25 February 2023	Egypt	63–71	Cameroon	Alexandria
19:00	Scoring by quarter: 14–24, 11–20, 21–12, 17–15
	Pts: Gendy 18; Rebs: Marei 12; Asts: Aboushousha 3	Boxscore	Pts: Mbala 18; Rebs: Bayehe 10; Asts: Hill, Minlend Jr. 3	Arena: Kamal Shalaby Hall; Referees: Hassane Kamaté (CIV), Diallo Mahamadou (MLI), Haytham Ihaqaf (LBY)

26 February 2023	Cameroon	63–89	Senegal	Alexandria, Egypt
14:00	Scoring by quarter: 9–16, 25–23, 14–24, 15–26
	Pts: Bayehe, Nyama 12; Rebs: Bayehe 8 Asts: Hill 8	Boxscore	Pts: Sané 30; Rebs: Sané 9 Asts: Badio 9	Arena: Kamal Shalaby Hall; Referees: Didier Gaga (RWA), Haytham Ihaqaf (LBY), Diallo Mahamadou (MLI)

26 February 2023	Tunisia	68–72(OT)	DR Congo	Alexandria, Egypt
16:30	Scoring by quarter: 13–13, 13–11, 18–18, 19–21, Overtime: 5–9
	Pts: Abada 20; Rebs: Lahiani 10; Asts: Abada, Roll 4	Boxscore	Pts: Nganga, Kamba 17; Rebs: Sakho 13; Asts: Mutuale 10	Arena: Kamal Shalaby Hall; Referees: Hassane Kamaté (CIV), Amr Aboollo (EGY), Silver Houngbed (BEN)

26 February 2023	South Sudan	97–77	Egypt	Alexandria, Egypt
19:00	Scoring by quarter: 27–19, 15–30, 30–19, 25–9
	Pts: Deng, Kuany 22; Rebs: Wang 8 Asts: Gatkuoth 6	Boxscore	Pts: Gendy 42; Rebs: Khalaf 8 Asts: Gendy 4	Arena: Kamal Shalaby Hall; Referees: Andris Aunkrogers (LAT), Yann Davidson (MAD), Antonio Bernardo (ANG)

=== Best third placed team ===
Due to the disqualification of Mali, the games against the last-ranked teams in Groups B and D in the first round were not counted.

Pos	Grp	Team	Pld	W	L	PF	PA	PD	Pts	Qualification
1	E	Cape Verde	10	6	4	735	700	+35	16	2023 FIBA Basketball World Cup
2	F	Senegal	10	5	5	684	683	+1	15	

Source: FIBA

== Statistical leaders ==
As of 26 February 2023

=== Player averages ===
Category	Player	Team	Average
Points	Shannon Evans	Guinea	19.2
Rebounds	Walter Tavares	Cape Verde	12.4
Assists	Brancou Badio	Senegal	6.5
Steals	Childe Dundão	Angola	2.9
Blocks	Kendall Gray	Rwanda	3.2
Minutes	Shannon Evans	Guinea	34.4
Efficiency	Walter Tavares	Cape Verde	25.0

=== Team averages ===
Category	Team	Average
Points	Nigeria	78.4
Rebounds	Senegal	47.9
Assists	Ivory Coast	18.0
Steals	Angola	15.0
Blocks	Senegal	4.1
Efficiency	Ivory Coast	84.7
