= Thetford Academy =

Thetford Academy may refer to:

- Thetford Academy, Norfolk England
- Thetford Academy, Vermont, U.S.
