= BC Margveti =

Georgian basketball club

Mega Tbilisi
- League: Georgian Superliga
- Head coach: Mikhell Kobeshavidze
- Championships: 1 Georgian A-Liga

Mega Tbilisi is a Georgian professional basketball club based in Tbilisi. The team plays in the Georgian Superliga, since it was promoted in the 2020–21 season.

== Honours ==
Georgian A-Liga

- Champions (1): 2020–21

== Notable players ==
Note: Flags indicate national team eligibility at FIBA-sanctioned events. Players may hold other non-FIBA nationalities not displayed.

Criteria

To appear in this section a player must have either:

- Set a club record or won an individual award while at the club
- Played at least one official international match for their national team at any time
- Played at least one official NBA match at any time.

- (South Sudan) Deng Acuoth
