= Malela Mutuale =

French basketball player

Caen Basket Calvados
- Position: Point guard
- League: Pro B

Personal information
- Born: 18 June 1991 (age 35) Décines-Charpieu, Rhône
- Listed height: 6 ft 2 in (1.88 m)

Career information
- Playing career: 2007–present

Career history
- 2007–2009: Centre Fédéral de Basket-ball
- 2009–2012: Paris-Levallois
- 2012–2014: Dijon Basket
- 2014–2015: Paris-Levallois
- 2015–2016: Le Havre
- 2016–2017: Saint-Quentin
- 2017–2023: Orléans Loiret Basket
- 2023–present: Caen Basket Calvados

Malela Mutuale (born 18 June 1991 in Decines-Charpieu, France) is a French basketball player for Caen Basket Calvados of the Pro B.
