= Kurt-Curry Wegscheider =

Central African basketball player (born 2001)

City Oilers
- Position: Point guard
- League: NBL Uganda

Personal information
- Born: 30 May 2001 (age 25) Bangui, Central African Republic
- Listed height: 1.93 m (6 ft 4 in)
- Listed weight: 90.7 kg (200 lb)

Career information
- High school: NBA Academy Africa (Saly, Senegal)
- College: New Mexico (2019–2021); USU Eastern (2021–2022); Lubbock Christian (2022–present)
- Playing career: 2024–present

Career history
- 2024: Bangui Sporting Club
- 2025: Kepler
- 2025–present: City Oilers

Kurt-Curry Axel Wegscheider (born 30 May 2001) is a Central African basketball player. He played college basketball for New Mexico, USU Eastern and Lubbock Christian. Wegschneider made his professional debut in 2024 with Bangui Sporting Club.

== Early life ==
Wegscheider was born in Bangui to a German father of French origin, and his mother was a former professional basketball player in the Central African Republic. After playing association football first, Wegscheider picked up basketball at age five. At age 14, he joined the NBA Academy Africa in Senegal where he played five years. He also played in the Basketball Without Borders program and was named MVP of the all-star game.

== College career ==
Starting from the 2019–20 season, Wegscheider joined the New Mexico program.

From 2021, he played for the USU Eastern, averaging 14.4 points and 4.3 rebounds in his only season with the Golden Eagles. At the end of his only season there, he joined Lubbock Christian University.

== Professional career ==
On 4 April 2024, Bangui Sporting Club announced Wegscheider had signed with them for the 2024 BAL season, the team's debut season in the Basketball Africa League (BAL). On 19 April, Wegscheider made his professional debut and had 3 points and 4 rebounds in 12 minutes of play in a 71–93 loss to Al-Ahly Ly.

On 5 April 2025, Wegschneider joined Kepler of the Rwanda Basketball League (RBL) for the 2025 RBL season. On 25 June 2025, he joined Ugandan champions City Oilers of the National Basketball League (NBL).

== National team career ==
Wegscheider plays for the Central African Republic national basketball team, and represented his country at AfroBasket 2021.
