= Koch Bar =

South Sudanese basketball player

Spintex Knights
- Position: Center
- League: Road to BAL

Personal information
- Born: September 15, 1996 (age 30) Abyei, Sudan
- Listed height: 2.11 m (6 ft 11 in)
- Listed weight: 102 kg (225 lb)

Career information
- High school: West Oaks Academy (Orlando, Florida); Arlington Country Day School (Jacksonville, Florida)
- College: Bradley (2016–2020)
- NBA draft: 2020: undrafted
- Playing career: 2020–present

Career history
- 2020–2021: Værløse Blue Hawks
- 2021–2023: Horsens IC
- 2023: BC Minsk
- 2024: Bendigo Braves
- 2024–2025: Kalleh Mazandaran
- 2025: Nadim Souaid Academy
- 2025–present: Spintex Knights

Career highlights
- Missouri Valley Conference All-Freshman Team (2017)

Koch Deng Aguer Bar (born September 15, 1996) is a South Sudanese basketball player for the Spintex Knights. Standing at 2.11 m (6 ft 11 in), he plays as center. Bar played four seasons of college basketball with Bradley.

== High school career ==
Bar attended West Oaks Academy in Orlando, Florida, and averaged 14 points and 9 rebounds during his junior season. He moved to Arlington Country Day School in Jacksonville, Florida, for his senior season.

== College career ==
Bar averaged 6.0 points, 5.3 rebounds and 1.2 blocks as a freshman. He was named to the Missouri Valley Conference All-Freshman Team. Bar averaged 5.7 points, and 4.3 rebounds per game as a junior. As a senior at Bradley, Bar averaged 6.2 points and 7.1 rebounds per game.

== Professional career ==
In May 2020, Bar signed his first professional contract with Værløse Blue Hawks of the Danish Basketligaen. In his rookie year, he averaged 14.5 points and a league second-best 10.4 rebounds per game.

For the 2021–22 season, Bar signed with Danish side Horsens IC.

In November 2024, Bar joined Kalleh Mazandaran of the Iranian Basketball Super League.

On January 12, 2025, Bar signed with the Nadim Souaid Academy of the Lebanese Basketball League (LBL).

== National team career ==
Internationally, Bar has played for the South Sudan national basketball team. He played with South Sudan at AfroBasket 2021, where he contributed 4 points per game off the bench, helping the team reach the quarterfinals in its first major tournament.
