= Alga Ndiaye =

Senegalese basketball player (born 1999)

No. 6 – Ryerson Rams
- Position: Shooting guard
- League: U Sports

Personal information
- Born: February 16, 1999 (age 27)
- Listed height: 2.01 m (6 ft 7 in)

Career information
- High school: Thetford Academy (Thetford, Norfolk)
- College: Ryerson (2019–present)
- NBA draft: 2021: undrafted

Mouhamed Lamoine Alga Ndiaye (born February 16, 1999) is a Senegalese professional basketball player who has played with the Ryerson Rams in Canada and the Senegal national team.

== College career ==
Ndiaye, who moved from Senegal to Longueuil, Quebec at age 11, committed to Ryerson Rams in Canada in 2019. In his rookie year, he averaged 9.9 points and 3.3 rebounds in 17 games.

== National team career ==
Ndiaye represented Senegal at the FIBA AfroBasket 2021, where the team won the bronze medal.
