= Thetford Academy, Norfolk =

Thetford Academy
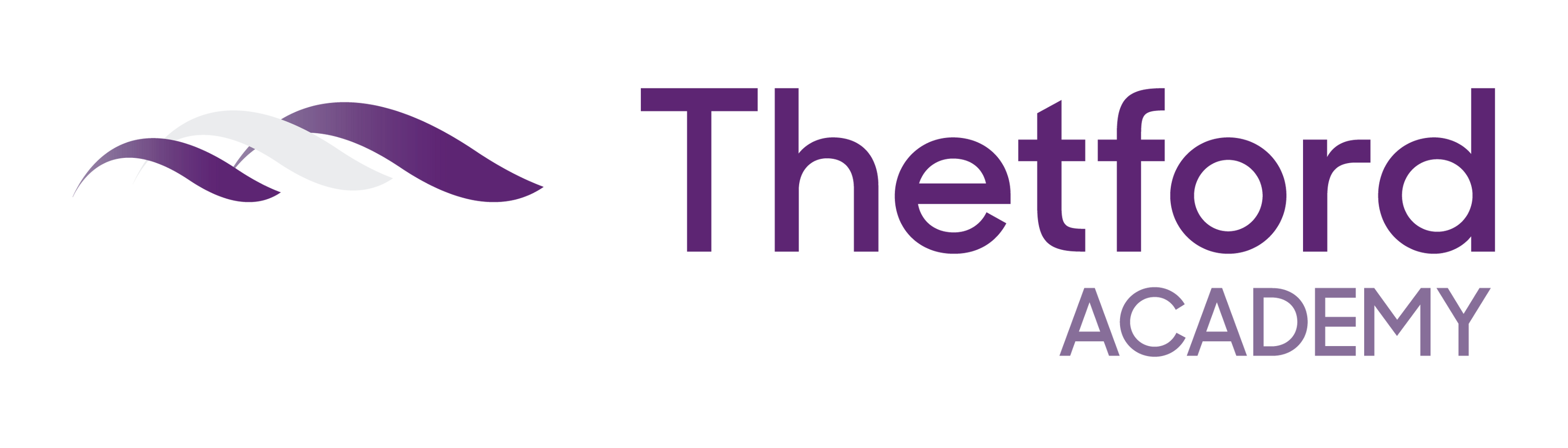

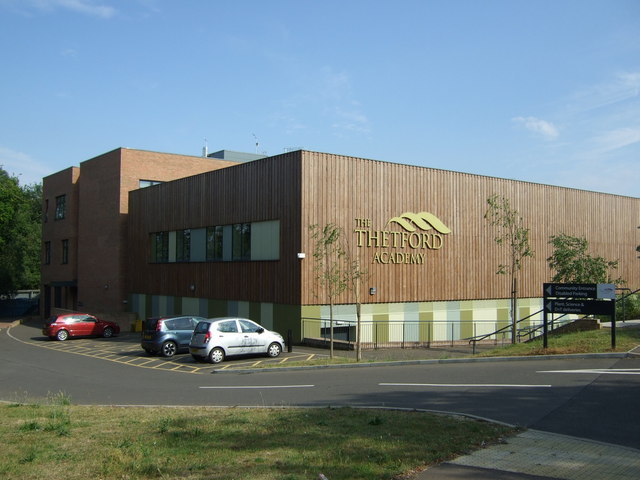

Location
- Croxton Road; Thetford, Norfolk, IP24 1LH; England; 52.4275°N 0.7565°E

Information
- Type: Academy
- Established: September 2010; 15 years ago
- Trust: Inspiration Trust
- Department for Education URN: 136204 Tables
- Ofsted: Reports
- Chair: Jane James
- Principal: Michael Fordham
- Staff: 168
- Gender: Coeducational
- Age: 11 to 19
- Enrollment: 1161
- Capacity: 1500
- Website: www.thetfordacademy.com

The Thetford Academy is a coeducational secondary school and sixth form (known as Thomas Paine Sixth Form) with academy status located in Thetford, Norfolk, England.

== History ==
Before 2010 the town of Thetford was served by two state secondary schools: Charles Burrell Humanities School and Rosemary Musker High School. In September 2010 these two schools were closed and the Thetford Academy was opened as the sole state secondary school for the town. The Thetford Academy operated over the two former school sites until the new enlarged school building was constructed at the former Rosemary Musker High School site, which was completed in September 2013.

The school was originally sponsored by a consortium of Wymondham College, Easton College and West Suffolk College. After the school received an Inadequate judgement from Ofsted in March 2013, the school transferred to Inspiration Trust. The school was reinspected in 2014 and found to be Good, a judgement repeated in 2018 and 2020.

== Notable former pupils ==
- Alga Ndiaye, basketball player
- Quévin Castro, footballer
- Terry Jermy, politician and journalist
