= Daniel Utomi =

American basketball player

Free Agent
- Position: Small forward

Personal information
- Born: March 7, 1997 (age 29) Houston, Texas, U.S.
- Listed height: 6 ft 6 in (1.98 m)
- Listed weight: 215 lb (98 kg)

Career information
- High school: Westside (Houston, Texas)
- College: Akron (2015–2019); USC (2019–2020)
- NBA draft: 2020: undrafted
- Playing career: 2020–present

Career history
- 2020: Kauhajoki Karhu
- 2021: Vichy-Clermont
- 2021–2022: Pistoia Basket 2000
- 2022–2023: San Giobbe
- 2023–2024: Kolossos Rodou
- 2024–2025: Astana
- 2025: Ostioneros de Guaymas
- 2025–2026: Petkim Spor

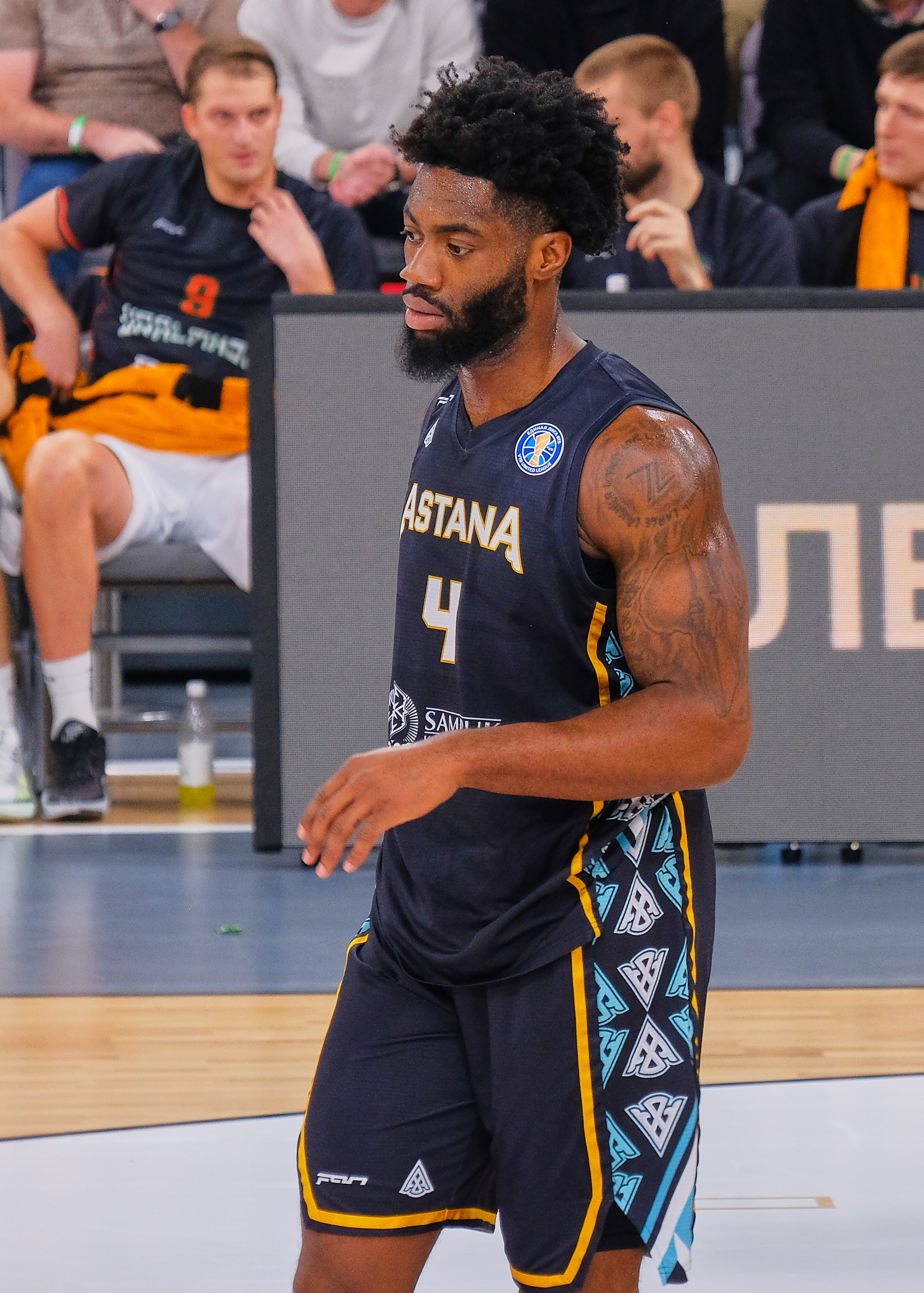

Uzodinma Utomi (born March 7, 1997), better known as Daniel Utomi, is an American-born Nigerian professional basketball player who last played for Petkim Spor of the Basketbol Süper Ligi (BSL). He played college basketball for USC and Akron.

== High school career ==
Utomi attended Westside High School in Houston, Texas. As a junior, he was named to the First-Team All-District. Utomi averaged 27 points and 14 rebounds per game as a junior, shooting 46 percent from three-point range. He garnered District Most Valuable Player honors after helping lead the Wolves to a 21–9 record and a spot in the regional tournament last season. In April 2015, Utomi committed to play college basketball at Akron.

== College career ==
After playing in two games as a true freshman, Utomi suffered a foot injury and was forced to redshirt the season. Utomi averaged 4.8 points and 1.2 rebounds per game as a redshirt freshman. He took on a leadership role during his redshirt sophomore season due to the departure of much of the team as well as coach Keith Dambrot. On November 18, 2017, Utomi scored a career-high 32 points and made a career-high seven three-pointers in a 76–59 win against UT Martin. As a redshirt sophomore, he averaged 16.8 points, 5.4 rebounds, and 1.8 assists per game, shooting 40.6 percent from behind the arc. Utomi led Akron in scoring as a redshirt junior with 14.2 points per game while also averaging 5.5 rebounds 5.5 rebounds and 1.3 assists per game, earning Honorable Mention All-Mid-American Conference recognition. Following the season, he decided to transfer to USC as a graduate transfer, choosing the Trojans over North Carolina, Kansas, and Virginia. Utomi was ranked the 23rd best graduate transfer according to ESPN. On February 15, 2020, he scored a season-high 23 points in a 70–51 victory over Washington State. As a senior, Utomi averaged 8.2 points and 3.8 rebounds per game.

== Professional career ==
On July 18, 2020, Utomi signed with Kauhajoki Karhu of the Finnish Korisliiga. In his debut on October 13, he scored 25 points in an 84–82 loss to Helsinki Seagulls. Utomi averaged 12.6 points per game shooting 53.7 percent from three-point range. He bought out of his contract on December 4.

On February 22, 2021, Utomi signed with JA Vichy-Clermont Métropole Basket of the French LNB Pro B. He averaged 11.9 points and 3 rebounds per game.

On September 11, 2021, Utomi signed with Pistoia Basket 2000 of the Serie A2 Basket.

Utomi spent the 2022–2023 season with Italian club San Giobbe, where he averaged 15.1 points, 4.4 rebounds and 1.4 assists in 28 games.

On July 11, 2023, Utomi signed with Greek club Kolossos Rodou.

On September 3, 2025, he signed with Petkim Spor of the Basketbol Süper Ligi (BSL).

== Nigeria national team ==
He has been part of Nigeria's national team at the AfroBasket 2021 in Kigali, Rwanda.
