= Cédric Bah =

Ivorian basketball player

No. 23 – JA Vichy-Clermont
- Position: Center
- League: Pro B

Personal information
- Born: 11 May 1994 (age 32) Abidjan, Ivory Coast
- Listed height: 2.00 m (6 ft 7 in)
- Listed weight: 84 kg (185 lb)

Career information
- NBA draft: 2016: undrafted

Career history
- 2012–2013: Douai
- 2013–2015: SIG Strasbourg
- 2015–2016: BC Souffelweyersheim
- 2016–2017: JA Vichy-Clermont
- 2017–2019: WOSB Basket
- 2019–2021: ADA Blois
- 2021–present: JA Vichy-Clermont

Career highlights
- French Cup champion (2015)

Cédric Bah (born 11 May 1994) is an Ivorian professional basketball player for JA Vichy-Clermont Métropole Basket and the Ivorian national team.

He represented the Ivory Coast at the FIBA AfroBasket 2021, where the team won the silver medal.
