= Ben Emelogu =

Nigerian-American basketball player

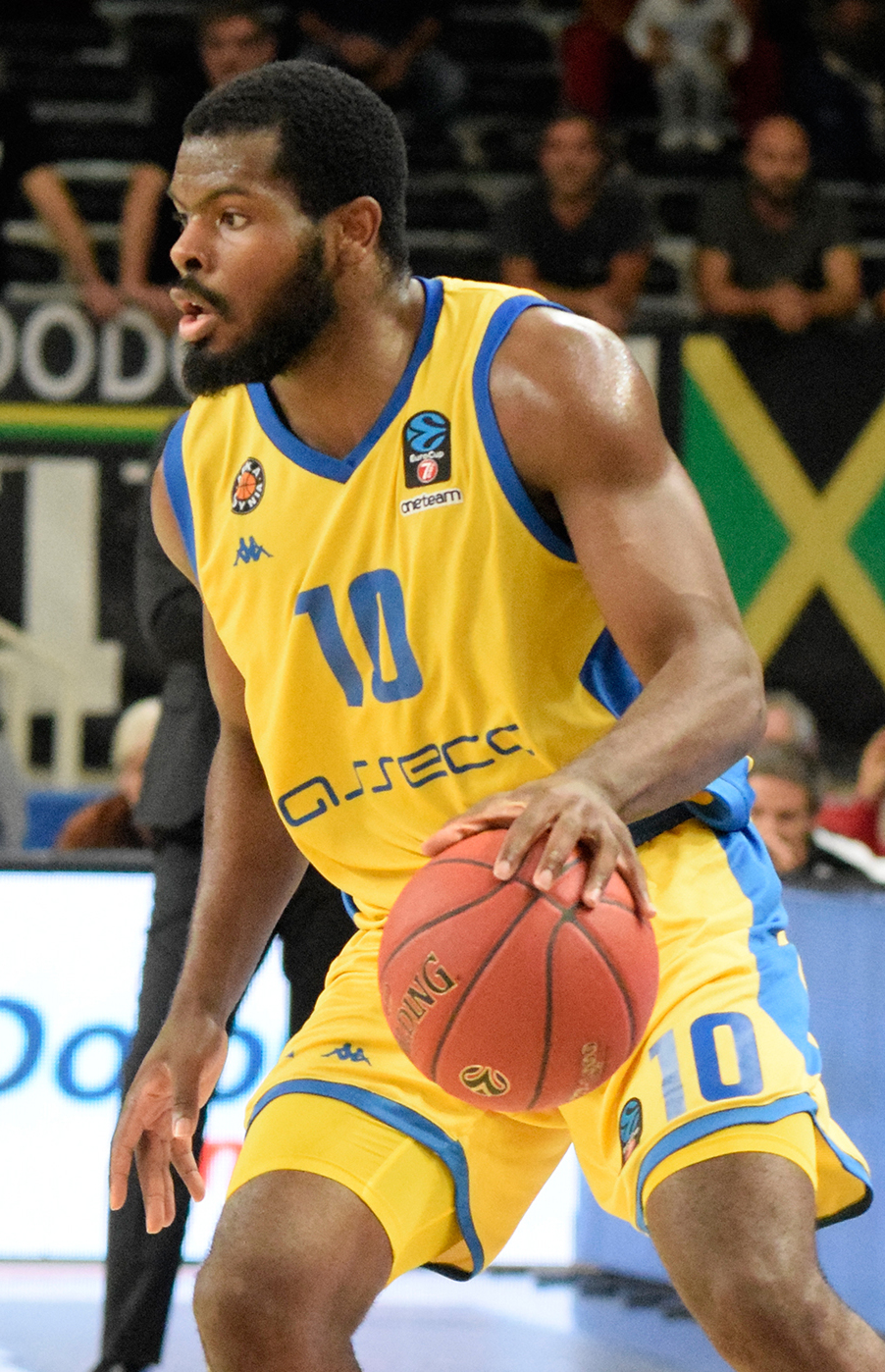
- Emelogu with Arka Gdynia in 2019

Rouen Métropole Basket
- Position: Small forward
- League: LNB Pro B

Personal information
- Born: November 24, 1994 (age 31) Dallas, Texas
- Listed height: 6 ft 5 in (1.96 m)
- Listed weight: 215 lb (98 kg)

Career information
- High school: South Grand Prairie (Grand Prairie, Texas)
- College: Virginia Tech (2013–2014); SMU (2014–2018)
- NBA draft: 2018: undrafted
- Playing career: 2019–present

Career history
- 2019–2020: Arka Gdynia
- 2020: Avtodor
- 2021–present: Rouen Métropole Basket

Career highlights
- AAC Co-Sixth Man of the Year (2017)

Benjamin Anyahukeya Emelogu II (born November 24, 1994) is a Nigerian professional basketball player who formerly played for Avtodor Saratov of the VTB United League. He played college basketball for the SMU Mustangs and the Virginia Tech Hokies.

== High school career ==
Emelogu attended South Grand Prairie High School. As a senior, he averaged 14.0 points, 5.0 rebounds, 2 assists and 1.2 steals per game, earning First Team All-Area honors. He led the team to the 2013 5A state championship game for the first time since 1975. Emelogu had 14 points and four assists in the 60–43 semifinal win against Byron P. Steele II High School.

== College career ==
Emelogu was named team captain of Virginia Tech as a freshman, averaging 10.5 points, 3.1 rebounds and 1.9 assists per game. After the season, he transferred to SMU to be closer to his family and was granted immediate eligibility. As a sophomore, Emelogu played through a torn meniscus and shot 27.7 percent from the floor. He underwent surgery after the season, before tearing it again and undergoing another operation. He suffered a back injury during a workout prior to his junior season and was granted a medical redshirt. As a junior, Emelogu averaged 4.3 points, 2.7 rebounds and 1.8 assists per game and was named American Athletic Conference (AAC) Co-Sixth Man of the Year with Jarron Cumberland. On February 1, 2018, he scored a career-high 24 points in a 76–67 loss to Tulsa. As a senior, he averaged 10.7 points, 5.5 rebounds and 1.7 assists per game, shooting an AAC-high 47 percent from three-point range.

== Professional career ==
On July 26, 2018, Emelogu signed his first professional contract with Arka Gdynia of the Polish Basketball League (PLK) and the EuroCup. He was unable to join the team due an injury. On July 24, 2019, Emelogu signed a new contract with Gdynia. He mutually agreed to part ways on February 18, 2020. In 17 PLK games, he averaged 7.7 points and 3.8 rebounds per game, and in 10 EuroCup games, he averaged 8.7 points and 4.2 rebounds per game.

On August 14, 2020, Emelogu signed a one-year contract with Russian club Avtodor Saratov of the VTB United League. On October 23, 2020, he parted ways with the team after appearing in one game, in which he recorded six points and two steals.

== Personal life ==
Emelogu's mother, Stephanie Hughey, is from the United States, while his father is from Nigeria. When he was in ninth grade, his parents separated and his father moved back to Nigeria. Emelogu's brother, Lindsey Hughey, played college basketball for Weber State.

== Nigeria national team ==
He has been part of Nigeria's national team at the AfroBasket 2021 in Kigali, Rwanda.
