= Benké Diarouma =

Malian basketball player (born 1995)

No. 13 – Cherbourg
- Position: Center
- League: Nationale 3

Personal information
- Born: August 12, 1995 (age 31) Bamako, Mali
- Listed height: 2.01 m (6 ft 7 in)
- Listed weight: 98 kg (216 lb)

Career history
- 2017–2022: AS Police
- 2022–present: Cherbourg

Career highlights
- Malian League MVP (2018); 3× Malian League champion (2019–2021)

Benké Diarouma (born 12 August 1995) is a Malian basketball player, who plays for Cherbourg Basket-ball of the Nationale 3 and for the Mali national basketball team. Standing at 2.01 m (6 ft 7 in), he plays as center.

== Early life ==
Diarouma started playing football, but was switched to basketball at age 15.

== Professional career ==
Diarouma was born in Bamako. Since 2018, Diarouma plays for AS Police in the Malian Ligue 1. In the 2017–18 season, he was named the MVP of the season.

In 2022, Diarouma signed with Cherbourg Basket-ball of the French fifth division NM3, his first club in Europe.

== National team career ==
Diarouma played with Mali at FIBA AfroCan 2019 and FIBA AfroBasket 2021.
