= Deng Acuoth =

Australian-South Sudanese basketball player

No. 14 – Beirut Club
- Position: Center
- League: Lebanese Basketball League

Personal information
- Born: 2 October 1996 (age 30) Sydney, New South Wales, Australia
- Listed height: 2.080 m (6 ft 10 in)
- Listed weight: 95.0 kg (209 lb)

Career information
- NBA draft: 2018: undrafted
- Playing career: 2017–present

Career history
- 2017–2019: Sydney Kings
- 2018: Melbourne Tigers
- 2019: Ballarat Miners
- 2019–2020: South East Melbourne Phoenix
- 2021: Ballarat Miners
- 2021–2022: Mega Tbilisi
- 2022–2024: Knox Raiders
- 2022–2023: Adelaide 36ers
- 2023: Al-Muharraq
- 2023: Al-Arabi SC
- 2024: Sagesse Club
- 2024: Keilor Thunder
- 2024: Kalleh Mazandaran
- 2024–2025: SG Apes
- 2025: US Monastir
- 2025: Al Bataeh
- 2026: Taipei Fubon Braves
- 2026–present: Beirut Club

Career highlights
- NBL1 South champion (2023); NBL1 Defensive Player of the Year (2019)

Deng Acuoth (born 2 October 1996) is an Australian-South Sudanese professional basketball player for Beirut Club of the Lebanese Basketball League (LBL).

== Professional career ==
Acuoth made his professional debut with the Sydney Kings of the National Basketball League (NBL) during the 2017–18 season. After a season in the SEABL with the Melbourne Tigers, he had another season with the Kings in 2018–19.

In 2019, Acuoth played for the Ballarat Miners in the NBL1 and won the Defensive Player of the Year Award. He then played for the South East Melbourne Phoenix during the 2019–20 NBL season.

Acuoth was set to play for the Ballarat Miners in 2020, before Covid saw the cancelled of the season. He returned to Ballarat in 2021.

For the 2021–22 season, Acuoth moved to Georgia to play for Mega Tbilisi of the Superliga. He later joined the Knox Raiders of the NBL1 South for the 2022 season.

On 10 August 2022, Acuoth signed with the Adelaide 36ers for the 2022–23 NBL season. He missed the season opener for betting activities that occurred during the off-season. He received a 10-match ban, with nine of the matches suspended subject to no additional breaches.

In January 2023, Acuoth joined the defending Basketball Africa League (BAL) champions US Monastir for the 2023 season. In August 2023, he helped the Knox Raiders win the NBL1 South championship.

In October 2023, Acutoh played for Bahraini club Al-Muharraq.

In January 2024, Acuoth joined Sagesse Club of the Lebanese Basketball League.

In September 2024, Acuoth joined Kalleh Mazandaran of the Iranian Basketball Super League.

On 13 November 2024, Acuoth signed with the Shenzhen Leopards of the Chinese Basketball Association, but he didn't play any game.

On 22 December 2024, Acuoth signed with the SG Apes of The League.

== National team career ==
Acuoth was on the South Sudan national basketball team for AfroBasket 2021. As the starting center of the team, he averaged 9.3 points and 9 rebounds per game.

In August 2023, Acuoth was named in the South Sudan squad for the 2023 FIBA World Cup.
