= Ahmed Khalaf =

Egyptian basketball player

Bebo
No. 22 – Al Ittihad Alexandria
- Position: Center
- League: Egyptian Basketball Super League

Personal information
- Born: 24 February 1999 (age 27) Giza, Egypt
- Listed height: 2.11 m (6 ft 11 in)

Career information
- Playing career: 2017–present

Career history
- 2017: Manresa
- 2017–2018: →Martorell
- 2018–present: Al Ittihad Alexandria

Career highlights
- 2× Egypt Cup winner (2020, 2021); All-Arab Club Championship Team (2021)

Ahmed Aboelela Moursi Khalaf (born 24 February 1999), commonly known as Bebo, is an Egyptian basketball player who plays for Al Ittihad Alexandria of the Egyptian Basketball Super League. He also plays for the Egypt national basketball team, with whom he appeared at the AfroBasket 2021 tournament.

== Early career ==
Khalaf played at the Basketball Without Borders camp in 2016.

== Professional career ==
After playing in the youth divisions of Gezira, Khalaf was signed by Spanish top-flight club Bàsquet Manresa at age 16. Manresa's sports manager Pere Romero had watched him play at the 2015 FIBA Under-19 World Championship. On May 14, 2017, he made his professional debut in the Liga ACB against in a loss against Tenerife, scoring 2 points in seven minutes.

The following 2017–18 season, Khalaf played on loan for Martorell in the third division LEB Plata.

In 2018, Khalaf returned to his native Egypt to play for Al Ittihad Alexandria.

== National team career ==
Khalaf played for Egypt's under-16, under-17 and under-19 team and played in African Championship and World Championship in these age ranges.

He played with the senior team at the AfroBasket 2021 with his country, appearing in two group phase games.
