= Jean-François Kebe =

Ivorian basketball player

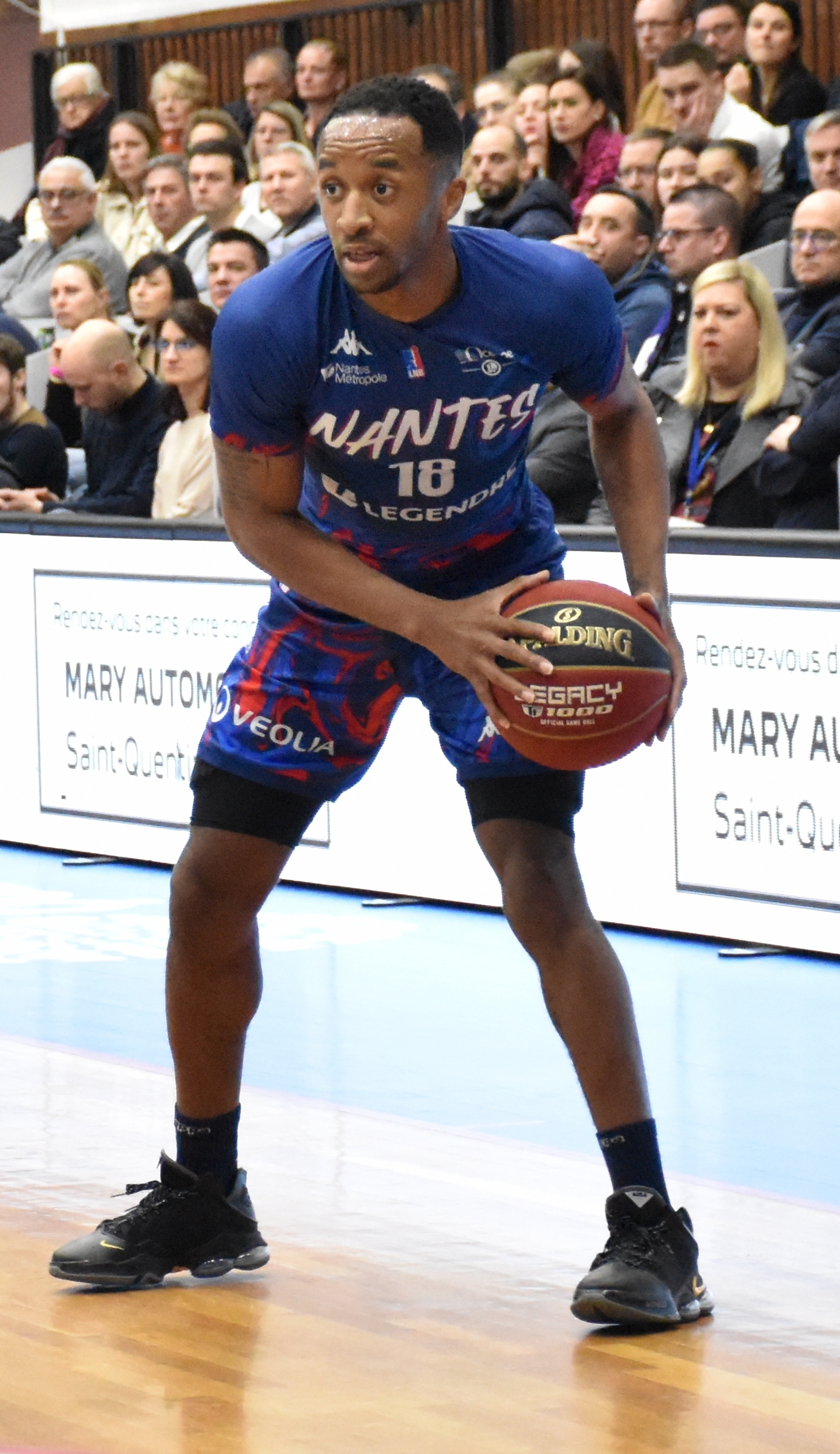
- Kebe with Nantes in 2023

No. 18 – Hermine Nantes Basket
- Position: Point guard
- League: Pro B

Personal information
- Born: 14 October 1994 (age 32) Nantes, France
- Listed height: 1.85 m (6 ft 1 in)
- Listed weight: 80 kg (176 lb)

Career information
- NBA draft: 2016: undrafted
- Playing career: 2012–present

Career history
- 2012–2015: Hermine Nantes
- 2015–2016: Orchies
- 2016–2017: Golbey-Epinal
- 2017–2020: Saint-Quentin
- 2020–2021: Alliance Sport Alsace
- 2021: Tours
- 2021–present: Hermine Nantes

Jean-François Kebe N'guema (born 14 October 1994) is an Ivorian professional basketball player for Hermine Nantes Basket. Born in France, he represents the Ivorian national team.

He represented the Ivory Coast at the FIBA AfroBasket 2021, where the team won the silver medal.
