= Yusuf Shehata =

Egyptian-American basketball player

No. 3 – Al Ittihad Alexandria
- Position: Point guard
- League: Egyptian Basketball Super League

Personal information
- Born: 16 January 1996 (age 30) Tucson, Arizona
- Listed height: 1.83 m (6 ft 0 in)
- Listed weight: 79 kg (174 lb)

Career information
- High school: Amphitheater High School (Tucson, Arizona)
- College: Bellevue (2015–2016); Point Loma (2016–2018)

Career history
- 2019–2022: Sporting Alexandria
- 2022–present: Al Ittihad Alexandria

Career highlights
- Egypt Cup winner (2024)

Yusuf Shehata (born 16 January 1996) is an Egyptian-American basketball player who plays for Al Ittihad Alexandria of the Egyptian Basketball Super League. He also plays for the Egypt national basketball team, with whom he appeared at the AfroBasket 2021 tournament.

Born in Tucson, Arizona, Shehata played one season of college basketball for the Bellevue Bruins, and two seasons for the Point Loma Nazarene Sea Lions.

Shehata won the 2024 Egyptian Basketball Cup with Ittihad.
