= Bali Coulibaly =

Ivorian basketball player

CEP Lorient
- Position: Power forward / center
- League: NM1

Personal information
- Born: 3 July 1995 (age 31) Abidjan, Ivory Coast
- Listed height: 1.99 m (6 ft 6 in)

Career information
- NBA draft: 2017: undrafted
- Playing career: 2017–present

Career history
- 2014–2017: JL Bourg
- 2018–2019: Union La Rochelle
- 2018–2019: Rupella
- 2019–2020: Toulouse
- 2020-2021: CEP Lorient
- 2022-présent: PB86 Poitiers

Bali Coulibaly (born 3 June 1995) is an Ivorian basketball player. He plays for the Ivory Coast national basketball team and the Toulouse Basket Club.

== Club career ==
Coulibaly started his career at the JL Bourg-en-Bresse in 2014 in the French JEEP ElITE League. He moved to the Union La Rochelle in the French NM1 league, He averaged 10.67 points in his only season at the club. In the 2019–2020 season, he moved to Toulouse Basket Club.

== National team career ==
Coulibaly represents the Ivory Coast national basketball team. He participated at 2019 FIBA Basketball World Cup where he averaged 4 points.
