= Teotónio Dó =

Angolan basketball player (born 1994)

No. 13 – CRB Tombouctou
- Position: Center
- League: Basketball Africa League

Personal information
- Born: 20 March 1994 (age 32) Luanda, Angola
- Listed height: 2.05 m (6 ft 9 in)
- Listed weight: 111 kg (245 lb)

Career information
- College: Utah State Eastern (2012–2014); Arkansas-Fort Smith (2014–2015)
- NBA draft: 2016: undrafted
- Playing career: 2016–present

Career history
- 2016–2018: Benfica do Libolo
- 2018–2019: ASA
- 2019–2022: Primeiro de Agosto
- 2022–2025: Petro de Luanda
- 2025: Kriol Star
- 2025–present: CRB Tombouctou

Teotónio José Pires Dó (born 20 March 1994) is an Angolan basketball player who plays for CRB Tombouctou and the Angola national team.

Standing at 2.05 m (6 ft 8 1/2 in), he plays as center. Dò played college basketball for Arkansas-Fort Smith before starting a professional career in Angola in 2016.

== Professional career ==
Dó started his professional career in his native Angola in 2016 with Benfica do Libolo, with whom he also played in the 2017 FIBA Africa Clubs Champions Cup. In the 2018–19 season, Dó played with ASA. In 2019, he transferred to Primeiro de Agosto.

On 16 September 2022, Dó signed a contract with Petro de Luanda, committing himself until 2024.

In April 2025, Dó joined Kriol Star of the 2025 BAL season. On November 12, 2025, Dó debuted for Malian champions CRB Tombouctou, against his former team Kriol Star, and scored 13 points.

== National team career ==
Internationally, Dó respresents the Angola national basketball team. He played with Angola at AfroBasket 2021, where he averaged 2.8 points and 3 rebounds coming off the bench.
