= Deng Geu =

Ugandan basketball player (born 1997)

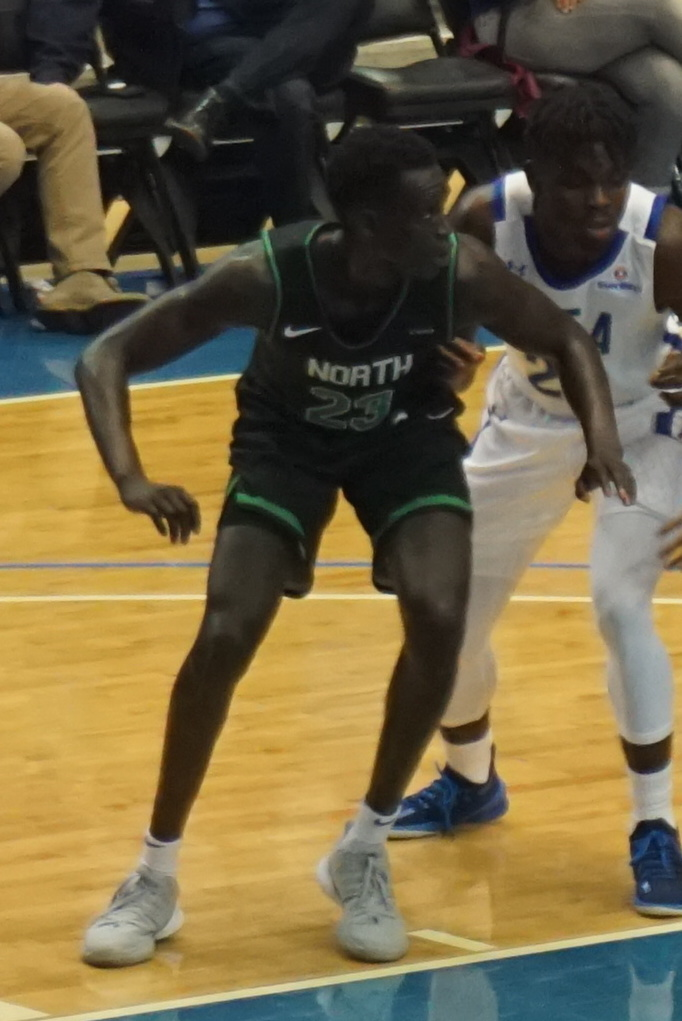
- Geu with North Texas in 2019

No. 23 – HLA Alicante
- Position: Power forward/center
- League: Primera FEB

Personal information
- Born: 1 January 1997 (age 29)
- Listed height: 6 ft 9 in (2.06 m)
- Listed weight: 215 lb (98 kg)

Career information
- High school: Washington (Sioux Falls, South Dakota)
- College: North Dakota State (2016–2019); North Texas (2019–2020)
- NBA draft: 2020: undrafted
- Playing career: 2020–present

Career history
- 2020–2021: Horsens IC
- 2021: Rasta Vechta
- 2021–2022: Texas Legends
- 2022–2023: Lusitânia
- 2023–2024: SVBD
- 2024–2025: Les Sables VB
- 2025–present: HLA Alicante

Dengeu John Geu (born 1 January 1997) is a Ugandan professional basketball player for HLA Alicante of the Primera FEB. He played college basketball for the North Dakota State Bison and the North Texas Mean Green.

== Early life ==
Geu was born in a refugee camp in Uganda as a son of South Sudanese parents. At age 6, he relocated to South Dakota.

== College career ==
In April 2019, Deng Geu left North Dakota State Bison men's basketball team. Geu was eligible to play immediately and did not have to sit out one year.

There, he averaged 9.6 points per game in his last season. He appeared in a total of 97 games in three seasons for NDSU and made one start in 2016–17. Geu left NDSU with 645 points (6.6/game), 335 rebounds, and 57 blocks.

Deng Geu later joined the University of North Texas where he graduated in 2020.

== Professional career ==
In September 2020, he signed his first professional contract with Horsens IC, holder of six titles in the Basketligaen, Denmark's top basketball league.

On 21 July 2021 he signed with Rasta Vechta of the German ProA. In five games, Geu averaged 1.4 points and 2.8 rebounds per game.

=== Texas Legends (2021–2022) ===
On 15 November 2021 he was acquired by the Texas Legends of the NBA G League.

=== Lusitânia EXPERT (2022–2023) ===
On 9 September 2022 Geu signed with Lusitânia EXPERT of the Liga Portuguesa de Basquetebol.

In August 2025, he signed for HLA Alicante of the Primera FEB.

== National team ==
Deng Geu has been a member of Uganda's national basketball team, nicknamed the Silverbacks.

At the 2019 FIBA Basketball World Cup qualification in Nigeria he averaged 13.3 points and 11.3 rebounds per game. He further took part in the AfroCan 2019 qualifiers.

== Player profile ==
Horsens IC publicly stated that they hired Deng because of his defensive abilities.
