= FIBA AfroBasket 2021 =

AfroBasket 2021

Tournament details
- Host country: Rwanda
- City: Kigali
- Dates: 24 August – 5 September
- Teams: 16
- Venue: 1 (in 1 host city)

Final positions
- Champions: Tunisia (3rd title)
- Runners-up: Ivory Coast
- Third place: Senegal
- Fourth place: Cape Verde

Tournament statistics
- Games played: 35
- Attendance: 48,748 (1,393 per game)
- MVP: (Tunisia) Makrem Ben Romdhane
- Top scorer: (Senegal) Gorgui Dieng (20.0 points per game)

FIBA AfroBasket 2021 was the 30th edition of the FIBA AfroBasket, a men's basketball continental championship of Africa. The tournament was hosted by Rwanda for the first time. It was originally scheduled to take place between 17 and 29 August 2021, but it was moved back a week due to the COVID-19 pandemic, to 24 August to 5 September 2021.

The tournament featured 16 teams, with South Sudan debuting at the AfroBasket stage. Tunisia was the defending champion, having won the 2017 tournament and they defended their title with a final win over Ivory Coast, while Senegal won the bronze medal.

== Host selection ==
In June 2019, FIBA Africa announced that Rwanda hosts the 2021 FIBA AfroBasket outbesting the bids of Senegal, Ivory Coast, and DR Congo.

== Venue ==
The entire tournament was hosted at the Kigali Arena, which was opened in August 2019. It is also the biggest indoor arena in East Africa.

Kigali	FIBA AfroBasket 2021 is located in Rwanda
Kigali Arena	FIBA AfroBasket 2021 is located in Rwanda
Capacity: 10,000	FIBA AfroBasket 2021 is located in Rwanda

== Qualification ==
The qualification started in 2020, with nine teams participating in the pre-qualifiers, including the four eliminated teams from the 2019 World Cup African Qualifiers. The hosts Rwanda qualified directly to the AfroBasket 2021.

=== Qualified teams ===
Team	Qualification method	Date of qualification	App	Last	Best placement in tournament
Rwanda	Host nation	23 June 2019	6th	2017	Ninth place (2009)
Nigeria	Group D top three	17 February 2021	19th	2017	Champions (2015)
South Sudan	Group D top three	18 February 2021	1st	Debut	
Mali	Group D top three	18 February 2021	20th	2017	Third place (1972)
Senegal	Group B top three	19 February 2021	29th	2017	Champions (1968, 1972, 1978, 1980, 1997)
Ivory Coast	Group C top three	19 February 2021	24th	2017	Champions (1981, 1985)
Tunisia	Group A top three	19 February 2021	23rd	2017	Champions (2011, 2017)
Angola	Group B top three	19 February 2021	21st	2017	Champions (1989, 1992, 1993, 1995, 1999, 2001, 2003, 2005, 2007, 2009, 2013)
Egypt	Group E top three	20 February 2021	24th	2017	Champions (1962, 1964, 1970, 1975, 1983)
Cameroon	Group C top three	20 February 2021	10th	2017	Runners-up (2007)
Central African Republic	Group A top three	20 February 2021	20th	2017	Champions (1974, 1987)
DR Congo	Group A top three	20 February 2021	7th	2017	Fourth place (1975)
Kenya	Group B top three	20 February 2021	4th	1993	Fourth place (1993)
Guinea	Group C top three	2 March 2021	6th	2017	Fourth place (1962)
Cape Verde	Group E top three	8 July 2021	7th	2015	Third place (2007)
Uganda	Group E top three	8 July 2021	3rd	2017	13th place (2017)

== Draw ==
The draw was held on 28 May 2021.

== Squads ==
Each team consisted of 12 players.

== Preliminary round ==
The schedule was released on 8 June 2021.

All times are local (UTC+2).

=== Group A ===
Pos	Team	Pld	W	L	PF	PA	PD	Pts	Qualification
1	Cape Verde	3	2	1	225	215	+10	5 (Note: Rwanda 74–82 Cape Verde)	Quarterfinals
2	Rwanda (H)	3	2	1	227	218	+9	5	Qualification to quarterfinals
3	Angola	3	1	2	212	206	+6	4 (Note: DR Congo 58–73 Angola)	Qualification to quarterfinals
4	DR Congo	3	1	2	196	221	−25	4	

Source: FIBA
Rules for classification: 1) Points; 2) Head-to-head results; 3) Points difference; 4) Points scored.
(H) Hosts
Notes:

24 August 2021
18:00

Boxscore

Rwanda	82–68	DR Congo
Scoring by quarter: 24–15, 19–19, 14–21, 25–13
Pts: Robeyns 23; Rebs: Kaje 9 Asts: Gasana 9		Pts: Munanga 22; Rebs: Sakho 9 Asts: Munanga 7

Kigali Arena, Kigali
Attendance: 2,000
Referees: Kingsley Ojeaburu (NGR), Hassane Kamaté (CIV), Youssouf Maiga (MLI)

24 August 2021
21:00

Boxscore

Angola	71–77 (OT)	Cape Verde
Scoring by quarter: 14–14, 20–12, 21–23, 11–17, Overtime: 5–11
Pts: Morais 21; Rebs: Bango 10; Asts: Ndoniema 4		Pts: Tavares 20; Rebs: Tavares 18; Asts: I. Almeida 7

Kigali Arena, Kigali
Attendance: 700
Referees: Babacar Gueye (SEN), Wojciech Liszka (POL), Diallo Mahamadou (MLI)

26 August 2021
15:00

Boxscore

Cape Verde	66–70	DR Congo
Scoring by quarter: 12–17, 22–18, 13–21, 19–14
Pts: Almeida 18; Rebs: Tavares 10; Asts: Xavier 6		Pts: Pwono 19; Rebs: Pwono 9 Asts: Munanga 8

Kigali Arena, Kigali
Attendance: 69
Referees: Julio Anaya (PAN), Redouane Darif (MAR), Youssouf Maiga (MLI)

26 August 2021
18:00

Boxscore

Angola	68–71	Rwanda
Scoring by quarter: 20–20, 18–15, 23–20, 7–16
Pts: Bango 14; Rebs: Bango 16; Asts: Ndoniema 5		Pts: Gasana 18; Rebs: Mpoyo 6 Asts: Robeyns 9

Kigali Arena, Kigali
Attendance: 5,000
Referees: Babacar Gueye (SEN), Diallo Mahamadou (MLI), Mbaye Seye (SEN)

28 August 2021
15:00

Boxscore

DR Congo	58–73	Angola
Scoring by quarter: 21–24, 16–13, 13–19, 8–17
Pts: Pwono, Sakho 17; Rebs: Sakho 11; Asts: Munanga 5		Pts: Morais 16; Rebs: Dò 8 Asts: Dundao 5

Kigali Arena, Kigali
Attendance: 2,000
Referees: Wojciech Liszka (POL), Cherubin Leslie (MRI), Youssouf Maiga (MLI)

28 August 2021
18:00

Boxscore

Rwanda	74–82	Cape Verde
Scoring by quarter: 14–29, 12–17, 17–22, 31–14
Pts: Kazeneza 18; Rebs: Ibeh 7 Asts: Gasana 6		Pts: Almeida, Mendonça 16; Rebs: Tavares 14; Asts: Xavier 6

Kigali Arena, Kigali
Attendance: 7,000
Referees: Arnold Moseya (RSA), Redouane Darif (MAR), Hassane Kamaté (CIV)

=== Group B ===
Pos	Team	Pld	W	L	PF	PA	PD	Pts	Qualification
1	Tunisia	3	3	0	237	178	+59	6	Quarterfinals
2	Egypt	3	1	2	231	229	+2	4 (Note: Egypt 1–1, +8 PD; Guinea 1–1, + 7 PD; Central African Republic 1–1 −15 PD)	Qualification to quarterfinals
3	Guinea	3	1	2	192	221	−29	4	Qualification to quarterfinals
4	Central African Republic	3	1	2	168	200	−32	4	

Source: FIBA
Rules for classification: 1) Points; 2) Head-to-head results; 3) Points difference; 4) Points scored.
Notes:

24 August 2021
10:30

Boxscore

Tunisia	82–46	Guinea
Scoring by quarter: 17–9, 24–11, 21–14, 20–12
Pts: Mejri 17; Rebs: Ben Romdhane, Ghyaza 8 Asts: Roll 5		Pts: C. Conde 9 Rebs: C. Conde 6 Asts: Sy 5

Kigali Arena, Kigali
Attendance: 30
Referees: Cherubin Leslie (MRI), Mbaye Seye (SEN), Tonton Banza Kalume (COD)

24 August 2021
13:30

Boxscore

Central African Republic	56–72	Egypt
Scoring by quarter: 9–13, 16–20, 18–17, 13–22
Pts: Hayes 15; Rebs: Grebongo, Hayes 9 Asts: Kouguere 4		Pts: Saleh 22; Rebs: Mahmoud 6 Asts: Gendy 4

Kigali Arena, Kigali
Attendance: 100
Referees: Redouane Darif (MAR), Julio Anaya (PAN), Arnold Moseya (RSA)

26 August 2021
12:00

Boxscore

Guinea	60–61	Central African Republic
Scoring by quarter: 12–20, 20–13, 18–19, 10–9
Pts: Mansaré 19; Rebs: Sy 12; Asts: Mansaré 4		Pts: Djimrabaye, Kouguere 16; Rebs: Hayes 7 Asts: Wegscheider 4

Kigali Arena, Kigali
Attendance: 34
Referees: Kingsley Ojeaburu (NGR), Arnold Moseya (RSA), Jean Ruhamiriza (RWA)

26 August 2021
21:00

Boxscore

Egypt	81–87	Tunisia
Scoring by quarter: 27–10, 18–28, 21–30, 15–19
Pts: Amin 17; Rebs: Ahmed 6 Asts: Metwaly, Shehata 4		Pts: Roll 25; Rebs: Mejri 8 Asts: Abada 8

Kigali Arena, Kigali
Attendance: 2,000
Referees: Wojciech Liszka (POL), Cherubin Leslie (MRI), Hassane Kamata (CIV)

28 August 2021
12:00

Boxscore

Egypt	78–86	Guinea
Scoring by quarter: 15–28, 20–20, 21–17, 22–21
Pts: Amin 21; Rebs: Saleh 6 Asts: Farag 5		Pts: Mansaré 25; Rebs: Queta 8 Asts: Sy 8

Kigali Arena, Kigali
Attendance: 35
Referees: Mbaye Seye (SEN), Kingsley Ojeaburu (NGR), Jean Ruhamiriza (RWA)

28 August 2021
21:00

Boxscore

Tunisia	68–51	Central African Republic
Scoring by quarter: 17–17, 19–13, 14–7, 18–14
Pts: Ben Romdhane 21; Rebs: Mejri 6 Asts: El Mabrouk 5		Pts: Kouguere 14; Rebs: Kouguere, Wegscheider 6 Asts: Mokongo 4

Kigali Arena, Kigali
Attendance: 500
Referees: Julio Anaya (PAN), Babacar Gueye (SEN), Diallo Mahamadou (MLI)

=== Group C ===
Pos	Team	Pld	W	L	PF	PA	PD	Pts	Qualification
1	Ivory Coast	3	3	0	255	205	+50	6	Quarterfinals
2	Nigeria	3	2	1	220	205	+15	5	Qualification to quarterfinals
3	Kenya	3	1	2	197	225	−28	4	Qualification to quarterfinals
4	Mali	3	0	3	206	243	−37	3	

Updated to match(es) played on 29 August 2021. Source: FIBA
Rules for classification: 1) Points; 2) Head-to-head results; 3) Points difference; 4) Points scored.

25 August 2021
12:00

Boxscore

Nigeria	81–73	Mali
Scoring by quarter: 28–12, 16–31, 27–10, 10–20
Pts: Emelogu 18; Rebs: Edogi 12; Asts: Ndugba 9		Pts: Djambo 18; Rebs: Diarouma 11; Asts: Kante 7

Kigali Arena, Kigali
Attendance: 20
Referees: Amr Aboollo (EGY), Antonio Bernardo (ANG), Cherubin Leslie (MRI)

25 August 2021
21:00

Boxscore

Ivory Coast	88–70	Kenya
Scoring by quarter: 26–24, 13–15, 21–15, 28–16
Pts: Costello 20; Rebs: Costello 8 Asts: Diabate 9		Pts: Ongwae 25; Rebs: Wamukota 11; Asts: Khaemba 6

Kigali Arena, Kigali
Attendance: 1,000
Referees: Julio Anaya (PAN), Tonton Banza (DRC), Tarek Ben Ltaifa (TUN)

27 August 2021
15:00

Boxscore

Kenya	55–71	Nigeria
Scoring by quarter: 8–20, 18–14, 13–15, 16–22
Pts: Odero 23; Rebs: Odero 8 Asts: Ongwae 2		Pts: Utomi 17; Rebs: Domingo 8 Asts: Domingo 6

Kigali Arena, Kigali
Attendance: 35
Referees: Wael Mostafa (EGY), Cherubin Leslie (MRI), Tarek Ben Ltaifa (TUN)

27 August 2021
18:00

Boxscore

Mali	67–90	Ivory Coast
Scoring by quarter: 14–27, 14–22, 14–19, 25–22
Pts: Kanouté 19; Rebs: Diarouma 8 Asts: Kanouté 5		Pts: Costello 25; Rebs: Costello 12; Asts: Diabate, Kebe 6

Kigali Arena, Kigali
Attendance: 500
Referees: Tonton Banza (DRC), Wojciech Liszka (POL), Sameh Estafanous (EGY)

29 August 2021
12:00

Boxscore

Kenya	72–66	Mali
Scoring by quarter: 22–18, 11–11, 22–16, 17–21
Pts: Ongwae 16; Rebs: Ongwae 11; Asts: Ongwae 7		Pts: Djambo 19; Rebs: Diarouma 9 Asts: Kanouté, Kanté 4

Kigali Arena, Kigali
Attendance: 70
Referees: Sami Beögharek (TUN), Cherubin Leslie (MRI), Jean Ruhamiriza (RWA)

29 August 2021
15:00

Boxscore

Nigeria	68–77	Ivory Coast
Scoring by quarter: 11–20, 23–19, 13–15, 21–23
Pts: Emelogu 13; Rebs: Agu, Emelogu 5 Asts: Ndugba 6		Pts: Zouzoua 17; Rebs: Costello 6 Asts: four players 4

Kigali Arena, Kigali
Attendance: 80
Referees: Wael Mostafa (EGY), Sameh Estafanous (EGY), Redouane Darif (MAR)

=== Group D ===
Pos	Team	Pld	W	L	PF	PA	PD	Pts	Qualification
1	Senegal	3	3	0	295	195	+100	6	Quarterfinals
2	South Sudan	3	2	1	183	190	−7	5	Qualification to quarterfinals
3	Uganda	3	1	2	221	247	−26	4	Qualification to quarterfinals
4	Cameroon	3	0	3	131	198	−67	2	

Source: FIBA
Rules for classification: 1) Points; 2) Head-to-head results; 3) Points difference; 4) Points scored.

25 August 2021
15:00

Boxscore

Cameroon	0–20	South Sudan

Kigali Arena, Kigali

The match was a forfeit by Cameroon due to health concerns.

25 August 2021
18:00

Boxscore

Senegal	93–55	Uganda
Scoring by quarter: 21–14, 19–17, 28–9, 25–15
Pts: Dieng 19; Rebs: Dieng, Henry 8 Asts: Henry 8		Pts: Seiko 12; Rebs: Kaluma 11; Asts: Drileba 5

Kigali Arena, Kigali
Attendance: 1,000
Referees: Wael Mostafa (EGY), Sami Belgharek (TUN), Sameh Estafanous (EGY)

27 August 2021
12:00

Boxscore

Uganda	80–66	Cameroon
Scoring by quarter: 27–22, 17–11, 18–14, 18–19
Pts: Seiko 20; Rebs: Wainright 12; Asts: Wainright 11		Pts: Strawberry 17; Rebs: Narace 9 Asts: Strawberry 5

Kigali Arena, Kigali
Attendance: 45
Referees: Wael Mostafa (EGY), Cherubin Leslie (MRI), Tarek Ben Ltaifa (TUN)

27 August 2021
21:00

Boxscore

South Sudan	75–104	Senegal
Scoring by quarter: 13–25, 19–24, 21–26, 22–29
Pts: Deing, Kuany 17; Rebs: Kuany 9 Asts: Puot 7		Pts: Badio 22; Rebs: Faye 10; Asts: Badio 7

Kigali Arena, Kigali
Attendance: 1,000
Referees: Arnold Moseya (RSA), Julio Anaya (PAN), Sami Belgharek (TUN)

29 August 2021
18:00

Boxscore

South Sudan	88–86	Uganda
Scoring by quarter: 26–23, 24–21, 15–21, 23–21
Pts: Deing 22; Rebs: Acuoth 18; Asts: Deing 5		Pts: Wainright 22; Rebs: Wainright 12; Asts: Wainright 10

Kigali Arena, Kigali
Attendance: 200
Referees: Antonio Bernardo (ANG), Wojciech Liszka (POL), Tonton Banza (DRC)

29 August 2021
21:00

Boxscore

Senegal	98–65	Cameroon
Scoring by quarter: 27–23, 20–8, 31–15, 20–19
Pts: Dieng 17; Rebs: Dieng 10; Asts: Badio 6		Pts: Bayehe 14; Rebs: Tha 7 Asts: Pitard 6

Kigali Arena, Kigali
Attendance: 200
Referees: Julio Anaya (PAN), Amr Aboollo (EGY), Tarek Ben Ltaifa (TUN)

== Knockout stage ==
=== Bracket ===
Round of 16
30 August
Rwanda	68
Guinea	72
30 August
Egypt	62
Angola	70
31 August
Nigeria	68
Uganda	80
31 August
South Sudan	60
Kenya	58

Quarter-finals
1 September
Ivory Coast	98
Guinea	50
1 September
Senegal	79
Angola	74
2 September
Cape Verde	79
Uganda	71
2 September
Tunisia	80
South Sudan	65

Semi-finals
4 September
Ivory Coast	75
Senegal	65
4 September
Cape Verde	65
Tunisia	75

Final
5 September
Ivory Coast	75
Tunisia	78
Third place
5 September
Senegal	86
Cape Verde	73

=== Qualification to quarterfinals ===
30 August 2021
15:00

Boxscore

Egypt	62–70	Angola
Scoring by quarter: 15–16, 10–17, 16–19, 21–18
Pts: Farag 11; Rebs: Khalaf 6 Asts: Khalaf 3		Pts: Morais 16; Rebs: Bango 8 Asts: Gonçalves 4

Kigali Arena, Kigali
Attendance: 1,000
Referees: Wojciech Liszka (POL), Kingsley Ojeaburu (NGR), Tonton Banza (DRC)

30 August 2021
18:00

Boxscore

Rwanda	68–72	Guinea
Scoring by quarter: 15–13, 15–18, 24–13, 14–28
Pts: Gasana 28; Rebs: Kazeneza 13; Asts: Robeyns 4		Pts: Mansaré 16; Rebs: Queta 7 Asts: Sy 6

Kigali Arena, Kigali
Attendance: 7,000
Referees: Antonio Bernardo (ANG), Julio Anaya (PAN), Arnold Moseya (RSA)

31 August 2021
15:00

Boxscore

Nigeria	68–80	Uganda
Scoring by quarter: 12–24, 19–20, 18–23, 19–13
Pts: Utomi 23; Rebs: Edogi 7 Asts: Ndugba 6		Pts: Opong 19; Rebs: Wainright 11; Asts: Wainright 6

Kigali Arena, Kigali
Attendance: 30
Referees: Mbaye Seye (SEN), Wael Mostafa (EGY), Diallo Mahamadou (MLI)

31 August 2021
18:00

Boxscore

South Sudan	60–58	Kenya
Scoring by quarter: 20–11, 19–13, 12–17, 9–17
Pts: Kuany 14; Rebs: Muo 10; Asts: Makoi 6		Pts: Odero 18; Rebs: Ongwae 10; Asts: Ongwae 5

Kigali Arena, Kigali
Attendance: 200
Referees: Amr Abooloo (EGY), Tarek Ben Ltaifa (TUN), Jean Ruhamiriza (RWA)

=== Quarterfinals ===
1 September 2021
15:00

Boxscore

Senegal	79–74	Angola
Scoring by quarter: 17–22, 27–11, 17–22, 18–19
Pts: Badio 14; Rebs: Dieng 15; Asts: Henry 9		Pts: Morais 28; Rebs: Bango 10; Asts: three players 3

Kigali Arena, Kigali
Attendance: 500

1 September 2021
18:00

Boxscore

Ivory Coast	98–50	Guinea
Scoring by quarter: 23–13, 32–11, 26–13, 17–13
Pts: Costello, Konaté 14; Rebs: Costello 9 Asts: Diabate 6		Pts: Sy 13; Rebs: Sy 7 Asts: Conde, Doumbouya 3

Kigali Arena, Kigali
Attendance: 300

2 September 2021
15:00

Boxscore

Tunisia	80–65	South Sudan
Scoring by quarter: 14–15, 26–25, 23–11, 17–14
Pts: Mejri 20; Rebs: Romdhane 12; Asts: Abada 8		Pts: Ring 14; Rebs: Acuoth 6 Asts: Gatkuoth 6

Kigali Arena, Kigali
Attendance: 300
Referees: Tonton Banze (DRC), Wojciech Liszka (POL), Diallo Mahamadou (MLI)

2 September 2021
18:00

Boxscore

Cape Verde	79–71	Uganda
Scoring by quarter: 24–20, 19–15, 18–16, 18–20
Pts: Tavares 23; Rebs: Tavares 15; Asts: Xavier 8		Pts: Kaluma 21; Rebs: Geu, Wainright 8 Asts: Seiko 6

Kigali Arena, Kigali
Attendance: 300
Referees: Hassane Kamaté (CIV), Wael Mostafa (EGY), Diallo Mahamadou (MLI)

=== Semifinals ===
4 September 2021
14:00

Boxscore

Cape Verde	65–75	Tunisia
Scoring by quarter: 14–16, 15–23, 15–20, 21–18
Pts: Tavares 16; Rebs: Tavares 8 Asts: Xavier 7		Pts: Ben Romdhane 16; Rebs: Ben Romdhane 10; Asts: Roll 10

Kigali Arena, Kigali
Attendance: 500
Referees: Kingsley Ojeaburu (NGR), Sameh Estafanous (EGY), Jean Ruhamiriza (RWA)

4 September 2021
17:00

Boxscore

Ivory Coast	75–65	Senegal
Scoring by quarter: 17–13, 19–16, 17–19, 22–17
Pts: Costello 17; Rebs: Edi 14; Asts: Diabate, Kebe 3		Pts: Dieng 24; Rebs: Dieng 11; Asts: Henry 8

Kigali Arena, Kigali
Attendance: 5,000
Referees: Tonton Banza (DRC), Antonio Bernardo (ANG), Wojciech Liszka (POL)

=== Third place game ===
5 September 2021
13:30

Boxscore

Senegal	86–73	Cape Verde
Scoring by quarter: 21–18, 23–21, 17–13, 25–21
Pts: Dieng 30; Rebs: Dieng 12; Asts: Henry 7		Pts: Tavares 18; Rebs: Tavares 14; Asts: Xavier 9

Kigali Arena, Kigali
Attendance: 2,000
Referees: Sami Belgharek (TUN), Amr Abooloo (EGY), Jean Ruhamiriza (RWA)

=== Final ===
5 September 2021
17:00

Boxscore

Ivory Coast	75–78	Tunisia
Scoring by quarter: 18–25, 16–22, 25–18, 16–13
Pts: Diabate 20; Rebs: Costello 8 Asts: Kebe 4		Pts: Mejri 22; Rebs: Ben Romdhane 10; Asts: Roll 9

Kigali Arena, Kigali
Attendance: 8,000
Referees: Antonio Bernardo (ANG), Wojciech Liszka (POL), Tonton Banza (COD)

== Final standings ==
Rank	Team	Record	FIBA World Ranking		
Rank	Team	Record	Before	After	Change
1st place, gold medalist(s)	Tunisia	6–0	34	30	4
2nd place, silver medalist(s)	Ivory Coast	5–1	50	46	4
3rd place, bronze medalist(s)	Senegal	5–1	35	36	-1
4	Cape Verde	3–3	95	100	-5
5	Angola	2–3	33	33	0
6	Uganda	2–3	98	90	8
7	South Sudan	3–2	97	94	3
8	Guinea	2–3	122	118	4
9	Kenya	1–3	112	111	1
10	Rwanda	2–2	91	95	-4
11	Egypt	1–3	60	62	-2
12	Nigeria	2–2	22	23	-1
13	DR Congo	1–2	81	81	0
14	Central African Republic	1–2	78	76	2
15	Mali	0–3	77	75	2
16	Cameroon	0–3	65	63	2

== Statistics and awards ==
=== Statistical leaders ===
==== Players ====
Points

Name	PPG
(Senegal) Gorgui Dieng	20.0
(Egypt) Ehab Saleh	17.5
(Angola) Carlos Morais	16.8
(Cape Verde) Edy Tavares	16.8
(Nigeria) Uzodinma Utomi	16.3

Rebounds

Name	RPG
(Cape Verde) Edy Tavares	14.2
(Senegal) Gorgui Dieng	10.5
(Angola) Jilson Bango	9.6
(Uganda) Ish Wainright	9.4
(Mali) Benke Diarouma	9.3

Assists

Name	APG
(Senegal) Pierriá Henry	7.4
(Democratic Republic of the Congo) Maxi Munanga	6.7
(Cape Verde) Jeff Xavier	6.6
(Uganda) Ish Wainright	6.4
(Nigeria) Ikenna Ndugba	6.0

Blocks

Name	BPG
(Cape Verde) Edy Tavares	4.0
(Rwanda) Prince Ibeh	3.0
(Central African Republic) Kevarrius Hayes	3.0
(Uganda) Deng Geu	2.4
(South Sudan) Deng Acuoth	2.3

Steals

Name	SPG
(Egypt) Ehab Saleh	4.8
(Mali) Siriman Kanouté	3.0
(Rwanda) Kenny Gasana	2.8
(Democratic Republic of the Congo) Henry Pwono	2.7
(Tunisia) Makram Ben Romdhane	2.6

Efficiency

Name	EFFPG
(Cape Verde) Edy Tavares	31.0
(Senegal) Gorgui Dieng	25.0
(Ivory Coast) Matt Costello	24.7
(Tunisia) Salah Mejri	20.8
(Uganda) Ish Wainright	18.8

==== Teams ====
Points

Team	PPG
Senegal	87.5
Ivory Coast	83.8
Tunisia	78.3
Uganda	74.4
Rwanda	73.8

Rebounds

Team	RPG
Kenya	52.3
Senegal	49.2
Ivory Coast	48.7
Cape Verde	47.5
Angola	43.8

Assists

Team	APG
Senegal	22.5
Tunisia	21.7
Ivory Coast	21.5
Uganda	21.2
Rwanda	20.3

Blocks

Team	BPG
Senegal	6.0
Rwanda	5.3
Cape Verde	5.2
Tunisia	4.8
Kenya	4.5

Steals

Team	SPG
Egypt	13.3
Mali	13.3
Nigeria	11.8
DR Congo	11.0
Tunisia	10.2

Efficiency

Team	EFFPG
Senegal	107.0
Ivory Coast	99.7
Tunisia	94.5
Cape Verde	83.7
Rwanda	82.3

=== Awards ===
The awards were announced on 5 September 2021.

2021 FIBA Africa Championship winners

Tunisia
Third title

All-Star team
Guards	Forwards	Center
(Tunisia) Omar Abada	(Ivory Coast) Matt Costello	(Cape Verde) Edy Tavares (Senegal) Gorgui Dieng (Tunisia) Makrem Ben Romdhane
MVP: (Tunisia) Makram Ben Romdhane

== See also ==
- 2021 Women's Afrobasket
