= AfroBasket 2013 squads =

2013 FIBA Africa Championship squads

This article displays the rosters for the participating teams at the 2013 FIBA Africa Championship.

== Group A ==
=== Algeria ===
The roster was announced on 19 August.

Algeria men's national basketball team roster
Players
Coaches

Pos.	No.	Name	Age – Date of birth	Height	Club	Ctr.
	4	Omar Belliche	21 – 16 February 1992		NAHD	(Algeria)
	5	Mustapha Adrar	31 – 12 April 1982		GS Pétroliers	(Algeria)
G	6	Abdelhalim Kaouane	31 – 29 November 1981	1.80 m (5 ft 11 in)	Al-Ahly	(Libya)
	7	Abdellah Hamdini	21 – 11 January 1992		GS Pétroliers	(Algeria)
	8	Zaki Guermat	19 – 7 September 1993		NAHD	(Algeria)
F	9	Mohamed Harat	23 – 9 June 1990	1.96 m (6 ft 5 in)	FUS de Rabat	(Morocco)
F/C	10	Nabil Saidi	33 – 13 March 1980	2.01 m (6 ft 7 in)	GS Pétroliers	(Algeria)
G/F	11	Abdesslem Dekkiche	27 – 27 February 1986	1.96 m (6 ft 5 in)	GS Pétroliers	(Algeria)
	12	Fathi Oukerimi	33 – 15 August 1980		TBB Blida	(Algeria)
F	13	Hocine Gaham	27 – 1 May 1986	1.94 m (6 ft 4 in)	GS Pétroliers	(Algeria)
F	14	Mehdi Cheriet	26 – 12 April 1987	2.01 m (6 ft 7 in)	Boulazac Basket Dordogne	(France)
	15	Sedik Touati	26 – 25 January 1987		GS Pétroliers	(Algeria)

Head coach

- (Algeria) Bilal Faid

Legend

- Club – describes last
  club before the tournament
- Age – describes age
  on 20 August 2013

=== Egypt ===
The roster was announced on 14 August.

Egypt men's national basketball team roster
Players
Coaches

Pos.	No.	Name	Age – Date of birth	Height	Club	Ctr.
G	4	Mouhanad El-Sabagh	25 – 23 April 1988	1.80 m (5 ft 11 in)	Al-Ittihad Alexandria	(Egypt)
F	5	Ibrahim Aboukhadra	25 – 17 July 1988	1.86 m (6 ft 1 in)	Al Ahly	(Egypt)
C	6	Haytham Kamal	25 – 17 November 1987	2.07 m (6 ft 9 in)	Al-Ittihad Alexandria	(Egypt)
G	7	Wael Badr	34 – 1 December 1978	1.93 m (6 ft 4 in)	Alexandria Sporting Club	(Egypt)
F	8	Anas Osama Mahmoud	18 – 9 May 1995	2.03 m (6 ft 8 in)	West Oaks Academy	(United States)
F	9	Ibrahim El-Gammal	25 – 23 March 1988	1.89 m (6 ft 2 in)	Al Ahly	(Egypt)
F	10	Mouhamad El-Lethi	34 – 10 January 1979	1.98 m (6 ft 6 in)	Alexandria Sporting Club	(Egypt)
F	11	Sherif Abd Alla	34 – 3 April 1979	1.85 m (6 ft 1 in)
F	12	Youssef Shousha	20 – 9 June 1993	1.92 m (6 ft 4 in)	Alexandria Sporting Club	(Egypt)
F	13	Ahmad Baraka	24 – 9 February 1989	1.98 m (6 ft 6 in)
F	14	Rami Ibrahim	25 – 6 February 1988	2.05 m (6 ft 9 in)	Al-Ittihad Alexandria	(Egypt)
F	15	Assem Marei	21 – 16 June 1992	2.04 m (6 ft 8 in)	Minnesota State Mavericks	(United States)

Head coach

- (Egypt) Amr Aboul-Kheir

Legend

- Club – describes last
  club before the tournament
- Age – describes age
  on 20 August 2013

=== Ivory Coast ===
The roster was announced on 17 August.

Ivory Coast national basketball team roster
Players
Coaches

Pos.	No.	Name	Age – Date of birth	Height	Club	Ctr.
F	4	Charles Abouo	23 – 4 November 1989	1.96 m (6 ft 5 in)	CB Peñas Huesca	(Spain)
G	5	Mouloukou Diabate	26 – 21 July 1987	1.82 m (6 ft 0 in)	SLUC Nancy Basket	(France)
F	6	Issife Soumahoro	24 – 31 October 1988	1.96 m (6 ft 5 in)	Strasbourg IG	(France)
G	7	Pape-Philippe Amagou	28 – 27 February 1985	1.85 m (6 ft 1 in)	Chorale Roanne Basket	(France)
G	8	Kinidinnin Konate	32 – 23 August 1980	1.88 m (6 ft 2 in)	Abidjan Basket Club	(Ivory Coast)
C	9	Hervé Lamizana	32 – 22 January 1981	2.07 m (6 ft 9 in)	Sichuan Blue Whales	(China)
F	10	Ismaël N'Diaye	31 – 20 April 1982	1.98 m (6 ft 6 in)	Basket-club Boncourt	(France)
G	11	Mickaël Toti	26 – 11 April 1987	1.81 m (5 ft 11 in)	Reims Champagne Basket	(France)
C	12	Jonathan Kale	27 – 18 October 1985	2.03 m (6 ft 8 in)	CB Coruña	(Spain)
C	13	Louri Zerbo	24 – 2 April 1989	2.05 m (6 ft 9 in)	BCM Gravelines	(France)
F	14	Guy Edi	24 – 26 December 1988	1.96 m (6 ft 5 in)	Gonzaga Bulldogs	(United States)
F	15	Mohamed Koné	32 – 24 March 1981	2.11 m (6 ft 11 in)	Chorale Roanne Basket	(France)

Head coach

- (Spain) Natxo Lezkano

Legend

- Club – describes last
  club before the tournament
- Age – describes age
  on 20 August 2013

=== Senegal ===
The roster was announced on 18 August.

Senegal men's national basketball team roster
Players
Coaches

Pos.	No.	Name	Age – Date of birth	Height	Club	Ctr.
F	4	El Hadji Malick Ndiaye	26 – 18 November 1986	1.96 m (6 ft 5 in)
G	5	Louis Adams	23 – 21 January 1990	1.86 m (6 ft 1 in)	South Carolina	(United States)
F	6	Ibrahima Thomas	26 – 7 February 1987	2.10 m (6 ft 11 in)
F	7	Mamadou Ndoye	33 – 6 October 1979	1.91 m (6 ft 3 in)	UGB	(Senegal)
F	8	Mohamed Diop	32 – 14 May 1981	1.98 m (6 ft 6 in)	UGB	(Senegal)
F	9	Maleye Ndoye	33 – 19 August 1980	2.03 m (6 ft 8 in)	Paris-Levallois Basket	(France)
G	10	Ibrahima Mbengue	30 – 13 October 1982	1.87 m (6 ft 2 in)	UGB	(Senegal)
F	11	Mouhammad Faye	27 – 14 September 1985	2.08 m (6 ft 10 in)	USC Rail	(Senegal)
G	12	Pape Malick Gadiaga	28 – 16 August 1985	1.89 m (6 ft 2 in)	ASCC Bopp	(Senegal)
C	13	Hamady N'Diaye	26 – 12 January 1987	2.13 m (7 ft 0 in)	Reno Bighorns	(United States)
C	14	Mouhamed Sene	27 – 12 May 1986	2.11 m (6 ft 11 in)	Baloncesto Fuenlabrada	(Spain)
F	15	Abdou Badji	21 – 4 April 1992	2.06 m (6 ft 9 in)	Union Neuchâtel Basket	(Switzerland)

Head coach

- (Senegal) Cheik Sarr

Legend

- Club – describes last
  club before the tournament
- Age – describes age
  on 20 August 2013

== Group B ==
=== Burkina Faso ===
Burkina Faso men's national basketball team roster
Players
Coaches

Pos.	No.	Name	Age – Date of birth	Height	Club	Ctr.
C	4	Moussa Ouattara	25 – 5 April 1988	2.02 m (6 ft 8 in)
C	5	Jean Paul Bayala	26 – 3 April 1987	2.00 m (6 ft 7 in)
G	6	Derek Leotis Durham	39 – 13 June 1974	1.77 m (5 ft 10 in)
F	7	Herve Yameogo	31 – 27 March 1982	1.96 m (6 ft 5 in)
	8	Mohamed Traore	28 – 9 January 1985
C	9	Samuel Ouedraogo	26 – 15 March 1987	2.03 m (6 ft 8 in)
	10	Emmanuel Pooda	27 – 29 August 1985
F	11	Joris Bado	22 – 20 May 1991	1.92 m (6 ft 4 in)
F	12	Kader Tapsoba	25 – 12 September 1987	2.09 m (6 ft 10 in)	AS Swallows	(Togo)
	13	Stephane Nissao	17 – 31 October 1995
G	14	Gilles Diendere	23 – 23 January 1990	1.91 m (6 ft 3 in)
	15	Mamadou Savadogo	35 – 17 April 1978		AS Swallows	(Togo)

Head coach

- (France) Jean-Paul Rabatet

Legend

- Club – describes last
  club before the tournament
- Age – describes age
  on 20 August 2013

=== Morocco ===
Morocco men's national basketball team roster
Players
Coaches

Pos.	No.	Name	Age – Date of birth	Height	Club	Ctr.
F	4	Reda Ali Harras	19 – 24 November 1993	1.98 m (6 ft 6 in)	Wydad Casablanca	(Morocco)
C	5	Reda Rhalimi	31 – 2 February 1982	2.05 m (6 ft 9 in)	Association Salé	(Morocco)
F	6	Abderrahim Najah	28 – 20 November 1984	2.00 m (6 ft 7 in)	Association Salé	(Morocco)
F	7	Zakaria El Masbahi	34 – 29 March 1979	1.93 m (6 ft 4 in)	Association Salé	(Morocco)
G	8	Mustapha Khalfi	33 – 1 January 1980	1.81 m (5 ft 11 in)	Chabab Rif Al Hoceima	(Morocco)
C	9	Mohamed Hjira	32 – 19 January 1981	2.02 m (6 ft 8 in)	Chabab Rif Al Hoceima	(Morocco)
F/C	10	Youssef Zangui	32 – 12 July 1981	2.02 m (6 ft 8 in)	Wydad Casablanca	(Morocco)
F	11	Abdelhakim Zouita	27 – 12 August 1986	2.00 m (6 ft 7 in)	Association Salé	(Morocco)
G	12	Soufiane Nadim	25 – 2 March 1988	1.85 m (6 ft 1 in)	FUS de Rabat	(Morocco)
C	13	Soufiane Kourodu	28 – 21 May 1985	2.06 m (6 ft 9 in)	Association Salé	(Morocco)
SF	14	Abdelali Lahrichi	20 – 19 July 1993	1.90 m (6 ft 3 in)	Wydad Casablanca	(Morocco)
F/C	15	Younes Idrissi	29 – 13 April 1984	2.03 m (6 ft 8 in)	Association Salé	(Morocco)

Head coach

- (Morocco) Hassan Hachad

Legend

- Club – describes last
  club before the tournament
- Age – describes age
  on 20 August 2013

=== Rwanda ===
Rwanda men's national basketball team roster
Players
Coaches

Pos.	No.	Name	Age – Date of birth	Height	Club	Ctr.
G/F	4	Olivier Shyaka	18 – 14 August 1995	1.98 m (6 ft 6 in)	Espoir BC	(Rwanda)
F	5	Patrice Twagirayezu	19 – 5 July 1994	2.00 m (6 ft 7 in)	Espoir BC	(Rwanda)
F/C	6	Thierry Suku Suku	24 – 12 July 1989	1.90 m (6 ft 3 in)	Lagnieu	(France)
G	7	Lionel Hakizimana	20 – 13 December 1992	1.90 m (6 ft 3 in)	Espoir BC	(Rwanda)
G	8	Aristide Mugabe	25 – 11 February 1988	1.83 m (6 ft 0 in)	Espoir BC	(Rwanda)
G	9	Aboubakar Barame	29 – 26 April 1984	1.80 m (5 ft 11 in)	Espoir BC	(Rwanda)
F	10	Hamza Ruhezamihigo	28 – 27 March 1985	1.95 m (6 ft 5 in)	Riviere des Prairies Jaguars	(Canada)
F	11	Cameroun Bradley	22 – 27 February 1991	1.96 m (6 ft 5 in)	Espoir BC	(Rwanda)
F	12	Kenneth Gasana	28 – 9 November 1984	1.97 m (6 ft 6 in)	Chabab Rif Al Hoceima	(Morocco)
F	13	Daniel Rugamba	26 – 16 March 1987	1.95 m (6 ft 5 in)	CSK Basket-Ball Club	(Rwanda)
C	14	Kami Kabangu	29 – 2 July 1984	2.03 m (6 ft 8 in)	Espoir BC	(Rwanda)

Head coach

- (Rwanda) Moise Mutokambali

Legend

- Club – describes last
  club before the tournament
- Age – describes age
  on 20 August 2013

=== Tunisia ===
Tunisia men's national basketball team roster
Players
Coaches

Pos.	No.	Name	Age – Date of birth	Height	Club	Ctr.
F	4	Radhouane Slimane	33 – 16 August 1980	2.05 m (6 ft 9 in)	Étoile Sportive du Sahel	(Tunisia)
F	5	Ziyed Chennoufi	24 – 29 November 1988	2.02 m (6 ft 8 in)	Étoile Sportive du Sahel	(Tunisia)
G	6	Nizar Knioua	30 – 8 June 1983	1.88 m (6 ft 2 in)	Stade Nabeulien	(Tunisia)
G	7	Mourad El Mabrouk	26 – 19 October 1986	1.85 m (6 ft 1 in)	Club Africain	(Tunisia)
G	8	Marouan Kechrid	32 – 2 June 1981	1.78 m (5 ft 10 in)	Club Africain	(Tunisia)
F	9	Mohamed Hdidane	27 – 27 April 1986	2.05 m (6 ft 9 in)	Étoile Sportive du Sahel	(Tunisia)
G	10	Omar Mouhli	27 – 19 March 1986	1.91 m (6 ft 3 in)	Étoile Sportive du Sahel	(Tunisia)
C	11	Mokhtar Ghyaza	26 – 15 November 1986	2.04 m (6 ft 8 in)	Stade Nabeulien	(Tunisia)
F	12	Makrem Ben Romdhane	24 – 27 March 1989	2.06 m (6 ft 9 in)	CB Murcia	(Spain)
F	13	Amine Rzig	32 – 25 August 1980	1.98 m (6 ft 6 in)	Al Ahly SC	(Egypt)
F	14	Lassaad Chouaya	23 – 22 August 1989	1.90 m (6 ft 3 in)	Club Africain	(Tunisia)
C	15	Salah Mejri	27 – 15 June 1986	2.17 m (7 ft 1 in)	Real Madrid Baloncesto	(Spain)

Head coach

- (Tunisia) Adel Tlatli

Legend

- Club – describes last
  club before the tournament
- Age – describes age
  on 20 August 2013

== Group C ==
=== Angola ===
The roster was announced on 16 August.

Angola men's national basketball team roster
Players
Coaches

Pos.	No.	Name	Age – Date of birth	Height	Club	Ctr.
F	4	Olímpio Cipriano	31 – 15 April 1982	1.94 m (6 ft 4 in)	Recreativo do Libolo	(Angola)
G	5	Armando Costa	30 – 3 June 1983	1.91 m (6 ft 3 in)	Primeiro de Agosto	(Angola)
SG	6	Carlos Morais	27 – 16 October 1985	1.93 m (6 ft 4 in)	Petro Atlético	(Angola)
C	7	Valdelício Joaquim	23 – 15 April 1990	2.08 m (6 ft 10 in)	Hawaii Rainbow Warriors	(United States)
PG	8	Hermenegildo Santos	23 – 16 August 1990	1.88 m (6 ft 2 in)	Primeiro de Agosto	(Angola)
PF	9	Leonel Paulo	27 – 30 April 1986	1.98 m (6 ft 6 in)	Petro Atlético	(Angola)
F/C	10	Joaquim Gomes	32 – 23 December 1980	2.02 m (6 ft 8 in)	Primeiro de Agosto	(Angola)
F	11	Reggie Moore	32 – 31 March 1981	2.01 m (6 ft 7 in)	Primeiro de Agosto	(Angola)
F/C	12	Felizardo Ambrósio	25 – 25 October 1987	2.01 m (6 ft 7 in)	Primeiro de Agosto	(Angola)
SF	13	Carlos Almeida (C)	36 – 24 September 1976	1.93 m (6 ft 4 in)	Primeiro de Agosto	(Angola)
PG	14	Milton Barros	29 – 21 June 1984	1.84 m (6 ft 0 in)	Interclube	(Angola)
PF	15	Eduardo Mingas	34 – 29 January 1979	1.98 m (6 ft 6 in)	Interclube	(Angola)

Head coach

- (Angola) Paulo Macedo

Assistant coaches

- (Angola) Jaime Covilhã
- (Angola) Walter Costa

Legend

- Club – describes last
  club before the tournament
- Age – describes age
  on 20 August 2013

=== Cape Verde ===
The roster was announced on 17 August.

Cape Verde men's national basketball team roster
Players
Coaches

Pos.	No.	Name	Age – Date of birth	Height	Club	Ctr.
F	4	Dimitry Coronel	21 – 13 August 1992	2.01 m (6 ft 7 in)	Maine Univ.	(United States)
G	5	Shane da Rosa	25 – 23 April 1988	1.86 m (6 ft 1 in)	Bristol Community College	(United States)
G/F	6	Avey Oliver	29 – 12 October 1983	1.93 m (6 ft 4 in)	TV Hohenlimburg	(Germany)
G	7	Braima Freire	31 – 19 January 1982	1.84 m (6 ft 0 in)	Seven Stars	(Cape Verde)
G	8	Mário Correia	35 – 17 March 1978	1.89 m (6 ft 2 in)	ASA	(Angola)
F	9	Flávio Gomes	24 – 26 December 1988	1.96 m (6 ft 5 in)	AngraBasket	(Portugal)
C	10	Michel Mendes	23 – 17 August 1990	2.03 m (6 ft 8 in)	Prédio SGL	(Cape Verde)
C	11	Aldevino Lima	26 – 25 August 1986	2.03 m (6 ft 8 in)	Northeastern	(United States)
C	12	Walter Tavares	21 – 22 March 1992	2.20 m (7 ft 3 in)	CB Gran Canaria	(Spain)
G	13	Brian Rudolph, Jr.	24 – 17 September 1988	1.81 m (5 ft 11 in)
F	14	Kevin Coronel	21 – 3 September 1991	1.96 m (6 ft 5 in)	Académica do Mindelo	(Cape Verde)
F	15	Rodrigo Mascarenhas	33 – 24 March 1980	1.97 m (6 ft 6 in)

Head coach

- (Nigeria) Alex Nwora

Assistant coach

- (Cape Verde) António Tavares

Fitness coach

- (Cape Verde) Paulo Fernandes

Physiotherapist

- (Cape Verde) Flávio Furtado

Legend

- Club – describes last
  club before the tournament
- Age – describes age
  on 20 August 2013

=== Central African Republic ===
The roster was announced on 19 August.

Central African Republic men's national basketball team roster
Players
Coaches

Pos.	No.	Name	Age – Date of birth	Height	Club	Ctr.
G	4	Anthony Ghouzy	19 – 30 August 1993	1.80 m (5 ft 11 in)	Tondema	(Central African Republic)
G	5	Tony White, Jr.	24 – 22 September 1988	1.83 m (6 ft 0 in)
G	6	Michael Mokongo	27 – 11 July 1986	1.80 m (5 ft 11 in)	Chorale Roanne Basket	(France)
F	7	William Kossangue	27 – 9 May 1986	1.98 m (6 ft 6 in)
C	8	Johan Grebongo	19 – 18 January 1994	2.04 m (6 ft 8 in)	Red Star Ndongo Club	(Central African Republic)
	9	Alban Yabanda	21 – 23 June 1992		Red Star Ndongo Club	(Central African Republic)
F	10	Christian Siris	31 – 21 November 1981	1.94 m (6 ft 4 in)	Red Star Ndongo Club	(Central African Republic)
F	11	Max Mombollet	32 – 17 January 1981	2.03 m (6 ft 8 in)
F	12	Martial Gotagni	34 – 2 May 1979	1.90 m (6 ft 3 in)
F	13	Max Kouguere	26 – 12 March 1987	1.98 m (6 ft 6 in)	Le Mans Sarthe Basket	(France)
	14	Jose Pascal Ngoko-Molombe	18 – 16 February 1995
F	15	Jimmy Djimrabaye	21 – 8 April 1992	2.03 m (6 ft 8 in)	BCM Gravelines	(France)

Head coach

- (Central African Republic) Fred Goporo

Legend

- Club – describes last
  club before the tournament
- Age – describes age
  on 20 August 2013

=== Mozambique ===
Mozambique men's national basketball team roster
Players
Coaches

Pos.	No.	Name	Age – Date of birth	Height	Club	Ctr.
F	4	Fernando Mandlate	28 – 11 August 1985	1.90 m (6 ft 3 in)	Maxaquene	(Mozambique)
G	5	Samora Mucavel	26 – 9 September 1986	1.85 m (6 ft 1 in)	Maxaquene	(Mozambique)
F	6	David Canivete	24 – 9 August 1989	1.90 m (6 ft 3 in)	Desportivo de Maputo	(Mozambique)
F	7	Sílvio Letela	30 – 6 December 1982	1.90 m (6 ft 3 in)	Maxaquene	(Mozambique)
G	8	Amarildo Matos	28 – 12 March 1985	1.85 m (6 ft 1 in)	Maxaquene	(Mozambique)
G	9	Ermelindo Novela	22 – 20 February 1991		Ferroviário de Maputo	(Mozambique)
F	10	Stélio Nuaila	28 – 24 April 1985	1.95 m (6 ft 5 in)	Maxaquene	(Mozambique)
C	11	Custódio Muchate	31 – 6 May 1982	1.98 m (6 ft 6 in)	Ferroviário de Maputo	(Mozambique)
F	12	Octávio Magoliço	28 – 4 October 1984	2.00 m (6 ft 7 in)	Ferroviário de Maputo	(Mozambique)
G	13	Augusto Matos	22 – 29 November 1990	1.85 m (6 ft 1 in)	Desportivo de Maputo	(Mozambique)
C	14	Armando Baptista	28 – 2 June 1985	2.00 m (6 ft 7 in)	Ferroviário da Beira	(Mozambique)
C	15	Edson Monjane	24 – 2 February 1989	2.00 m (6 ft 7 in)	Ferroviário de Maputo	(Mozambique)

Head coach

- (Mozambique) Milagre Macome

Legend

- Club – describes last
  club before the tournament
- Age – describes age
  on 20 August 2013

== Group D ==
=== Cameroon ===
Cameroon men's national basketball team roster
Players
Coaches

Pos.	No.	Name	Age – Date of birth	Height	Club	Ctr.
G	4	Gédéon Pitard	24 – 7 February 1989	1.88 m (6 ft 2 in)	STB Le Havre	(France)
G	5	Aldo Curti	26 – 27 February 1987	1.80 m (5 ft 11 in)	Orléans Loiret Basket	(France)
F	6	Alexis Wangmene	24 – 1 March 1989	2.03 m (6 ft 8 in)	KD Hopsi Polzela	(Slovenia)
F	7	Yves Mekongo	26 – 25 July 1987	2.01 m (6 ft 7 in)
F	8	Christian Bayang	26 – 7 May 1987	1.96 m (6 ft 5 in)	Association Salé	(Morocco)
G	9	Jérémy Nzeulie	22 – 15 February 1991	1.87 m (6 ft 2 in)	JSF Nanterre	(France)
F	10	Steve Moundou	21 – 7 April 1992	2.00 m (6 ft 7 in)	Harvard	(United States)
F	11	Frank Tchoubaye	21 – 15 April 1992	1.98 m (6 ft 6 in)	Condor Basketball Club	(Cameroon)
F	12	Brice Vounang	30 – 3 December 1982	2.03 m (6 ft 8 in)	Étendard de Brest	(France)
F	13	Luc Mbah a Moute	26 – 9 September 1986	2.00 m (6 ft 7 in)	Minnesota Timberwolves	(United States)
F	14	Alfred Aboya	28 – 2 January 1985	2.03 m (6 ft 8 in)	Final Gençlik	(Turkey)
F	15	Gaston Essengué	29 – 10 October 1983	2.03 m (6 ft 8 in)	San Isidro San Francisco	(Argentina)

Head coach

- (Cameroon) José Ruiz

Legend

- Club – describes last
  club before the tournament
- Age – describes age
  on 20 August 2013

=== Congo ===
Congo men's national basketball team roster
Players
Coaches

Pos.	No.	Name	Age – Date of birth	Height	Club	Ctr.
G	4	Kris Morlende	33 – 28 September 1979	1.82 m (6 ft 0 in)	JDA Dijon Basket	(France)
	5	Japhie Nguia	21 – 24 March 1992		BC Avenir du Rail	(Republic of the Congo)
	6	Léo Okemba	29 – 29 July 1984		Le Portel	(France)
F	7	Jean Felix Moupegnou	30 – 17 October 1982	2.01 m (6 ft 7 in)	UJAP Quimper	(France)
	8	Romaric Kondzy	32 – 12 December 1980		Inter Club Brazzaville	(Republic of the Congo)
	9	Bertrand Boukinda Dibessa	32 – 6 March 1981		ASB Mazembe	(Democratic Republic of the Congo)
F	10	Giovan Oniangue	22 – 24 April 1991	1.96 m (6 ft 5 in)	Paris-Levallois Basket	(France)
	11	Medhie Mouesse	20 – 12 April 1993		Inter Club Brazzaville	(Republic of the Congo)
F/C	12	Karl Niamamoukoko	21 – 16 February 1992	2.05 m (6 ft 9 in)	Patronage Sainte-Anne	(Republic of the Congo)
	13	Rodel Ongoundou	20 – 3 May 1993		Inter Club Brazzaville	(Republic of the Congo)
	14	Exocé Gampourou	18 – 18 October 1994

Head coach

- (France) Ludovic Pouillard

Assistant coach

- (France) Stéphane Paty

Legend

- Club – describes last
  club before the tournament
- Age – describes age
  on 20 August 2013

=== Mali ===
Mali men's national basketball team roster
Players
Coaches

Pos.	No.	Name	Age – Date of birth	Height	Club	Ctr.
G	4	Modibo Niakate	32 – 26 March 1981	1.85 m (6 ft 1 in)
	5	Mahamadou Kante	21 – 2 March 1992
	6	Abdrahamane Maïga	23 – 11 January 1990
G	7	Ibrahim Saounera	26 – 3 April 1987	1.78 m (5 ft 10 in)
	9	Ibrahima Cherif Haidara	20 – 9 October 1992
	11	Namory Boundy	23 – 26 October 1989		Chorale Roanne Basket	(France)
	12	Boubacar Fadiala Sidibe	18 – 8 September 1994
C	13	Hassana Touré	33 – 30 July 1980	2.05 m (6 ft 9 in)	ASVEL Basket	(France)
C	14	Mohamed Tangara	29 – 11 August 1984	2.09 m (6 ft 10 in)
C	15	Nouha Diakité	32 – 20 December 1980	2.08 m (6 ft 10 in)	BK Prostějov	(Czech Republic)

Head coach

- (France) José Ruiz

Legend

- Club – describes last
  club before the tournament
- Age – describes age
  on 20 August 2013

=== Nigeria ===
The roster was announced on 18 August.

Nigeria men's national basketball team roster
Players
Coaches

Pos.	No.	Name	Age – Date of birth	Height	Club	Ctr.
G	4	Ben Uzoh	25 – 18 March 1988	1.91 m (6 ft 3 in)	Springfield Armor	(United States)
F	5	Stan Okoye	22 – 10 April 1991	1.98 m (6 ft 6 in)	Ikaros Chalkidas B.C.	(Greece)
F/C	6	Ike Diogu	29 – 11 September 1983	2.06 m (6 ft 9 in)	Leones de Ponce	(Puerto Rico)
F	7	Al-Farouq Aminu	22 – 21 September 1990	2.06 m (6 ft 9 in)	New Orleans Pelicans	(United States)
F	8	Jamal Olasewere	21 – 16 September 1991	2.01 m (6 ft 7 in)	Guerino Vanoli Basket	(Italy)
G/F	9	Derrick Obasohan	32 – 18 April 1981	2.01 m (6 ft 7 in)
F/C	10	Gani Lawal	24 – 7 November 1988	2.06 m (6 ft 9 in)	BK VEF Rīga	(Latvia)
G	11	Richard Oruche	25 – 30 August 1987	1.93 m (6 ft 4 in)	Guaiqueríes de Margarita	(Venezuela)
F	12	Andy Ogide	25 – 1 October 1987	2.06 m (6 ft 9 in)	Club Ourense Baloncesto	(Spain)
G/F	13	Stanley Gumut	27 – 21 February 1986	1.98 m (6 ft 6 in)	Mark Mentors	(Nigeria)
C	14	Alade Aminu	25 – 14 September 1987	2.01 m (6 ft 7 in)	Pınar Karşıyaka	(Turkey)
C	15	Olumide Oyedeji	32 – 11 May 1981	2.01 m (6 ft 7 in)	Link Tochigi Brex	(Japan)

Head coach

- (Nigeria) Ayo Bakare

Assistant coaches

- (Nigeria) Sani Ahmed
- (Nigeria) Ayinla Johnson
- (Nigeria) Ogoh Odaudu
- (Nigeria) Abdulrahman Mohammed

Team doctor

- (Nigeria) Suleiman Ohida

Physioterapist

- (Nigeria) Ekundayo Ogunkunle

Legend

- Club – describes last
  club before the tournament
- Age – describes age
  on 20 August 2013

== See also ==
- 2013 FIBA Africa Clubs Champions Cup squads
