= AfroBasket 2013 =

Tournament details
- Host country: Ivory Coast
- City: Abidjan
- Dates: 20–31 August
- Teams: 16
- Venue: 1 (in 1 host city)

Final positions
- Champions: Angola (11th title)
- Runners-up: Egypt
- Third place: Senegal
- Fourth place: Ivory Coast

Tournament statistics
- MVP: (Angola) Carlos Morais
- Top scorer: (Nigeria) Ike Diogu (21.9 points per game)

AfroBasket 2013 was the 27th FIBA Africa Championship, played under the rules of FIBA, the world governing body for basketball, and the FIBA Africa thereof. The tournament was hosted by Ivory Coast from August 20 to 31, all games were played at the Palais des Sports de Treichville, Abidjan.

Angola defeated Egypt 57–40 in the final to win their eleventh title.

It has been considered as one of the greatest sporting tournaments of all time and it solidified the FIBA Africa Championship as one of the top competitions in world sports.

== Format ==
The sixteen teams were split into four groups. Every team advanced to the knockout stage and participated at the Round of 16. The winners advanced to the quarterfinals to play out the champion. The losers from those quarterfinals played for the places 5–8. The defeated teams from the round of 16 were ranked by their preliminary round results and played placement games for the places 9–16.

== Venue ==
Abidjan	AfroBasket 2013 (Ivory Coast)
Palais des Sports de Treichville	AfroBasket 2013 (Ivory Coast)
Capacity: 3,500	AfroBasket 2013 (Ivory Coast)

== Qualification ==
The following national teams have secured qualification:

Number	Team	Qualified as	Finals Appearance	Last Appearance
1	Ivory Coast	Host	21st	2011
2	Tunisia	1st place FIBA Africa Championship 2011	20th	2011
3	Angola	2nd place FIBA Africa Championship 2011	18th	2011
4	Nigeria	3rd place FIBA Africa Championship 2011	16th	2011
5	Burkina Faso	Zone 3 Winner	1st	–
6	Morocco	Zone 1 Winner	18th	2011
7	Algeria	Zone 1 Runner-Up	15th	2005
8	Senegal	Zone 2 Winner	26th	2011
9	Cape Verde	Zone 2 Runner-Up	5th	2009
10	Central African Republic	Zone 4 Winner	17th	2011
11	Cameroon	Zone 4 Runner-Up	7th	2011
12	Congo	Zone 4 Third Place	6th	2009
13	Egypt	Zone 5 Winner	21st	2011
14	Mozambique	Zone 6 Winner	12th	2011
15	Mali	Wild Card	17th	2011
16	Rwanda	Wild Card	4th	2011

== Group stage ==
The draw was held on March 30, 2013.

=== Group A ===
Team	Pld	W	L	PF	PA	PD	Pts
Ivory Coast	3	3	0	207	155	+52	6
Senegal	3	2	1	180	201	−21	5
Algeria	3	1	2	171	189	−18	4
Egypt	3	0	3	195	208	−13	3

20 August 2013
15:00

Boxscore

Egypt	70–72	Senegal
Scoring by quarter: 16–18, 16–23, 14–18, 24–13
Pts: Marei 16; Rebs: Marei 9 Asts: Badr 4		Pts: Faye 20; Rebs: Mal. Ndoye, Sene 5 Asts: Mam. Ndoye, Faye 3

Palais des Sports de Treichville, Abidjan
Referees: José Martin (ESP), Carlos José Julio (ANG), Arnaud Kom Njilo (CMR)

20 August 2013
17:30

Boxscore

Ivory Coast	64–47	Algeria
Scoring by quarter: 16–8, 14–13, 15–17, 19–9
Pts: Lamizana 13; Rebs: Konate 10; Asts: Diabate 5		Pts: Harat 14; Rebs: Touati 14; Asts: Kaouane 5

Palais des Sports de Treichville, Abidjan
Referees: Vitalis Gode (KEN), Nourou Djeri (TOG), Charles Foster (RSA)

22 August 2013
15:00

Boxscore

Algeria	67–63	Egypt
Scoring by quarter: 14–21, 15–7, 15–26, 23–9
Pts: Cheriet 23; Rebs: Harat, Gaham 10; Asts: Kaouane 5		Pts: Marei 14; Rebs: Ibrahim 9 Asts: Shousha 4

Palais des Sports de Treichville, Abidjan
Referees: Carlos José Julio (ANG), Naftal Chongo (MOZ), Kingsley Ojeaburu (NGR)

22 August 2013
17:30

Boxscore

Senegal	46–74	Ivory Coast
Scoring by quarter: 14–18, 12–11, 10–25, 10–20
Pts: Mbengue 16; Rebs: Sene 8 Asts: Ndoye 2		Pts: Abouo 15; Rebs: Diabate, Lamizana 7 Asts: Diabate 6

Palais des Sports de Treichville, Abidjan
Referees: Matej Boltauzer (SLO), Abreu Muhimua (MOZ), Charles Foster (RSA)

24 August 2013
15:00

Boxscore

Senegal	62–57	Algeria
Scoring by quarter: 10–18, 20–10, 22–12, 10–17
Pts: Mal. Ndoye 14; Rebs: three players 5 Asts: three players 3		Pts: Harat, Cheriet 14; Rebs: Cheriet 9 Asts: Kaouane 4

Palais des Sports de Treichville, Abidjan
Referees: Naftal Chongo (MOZ), Kingsley Ojeaburu (NGR), Steve-Gaiton Koukou-Te-Ngbandi (CAF)

24 August 2013
17:30

Boxscore

Ivory Coast	69–62	Egypt
Scoring by quarter: 21–16, 12–15, 23–17, 13–14
Pts: Lamizana 18; Rebs: Konate 6 Asts: Edi 4		Pts: Marei 25; Rebs: Marei 19; Asts: Badr 3

Palais des Sports de Treichville, Abidjan
Referees: Abreu Muhimua (MOZ), Armand Okoua (CGO), Arnaud Kom Njilo (CMR)

=== Group B ===
Team	Pld	W	L	PF	PA	PD	Pts
Tunisia	3	3	0	239	180	+59	6
Morocco	3	2	1	225	176	+49	5
Rwanda	3	1	2	218	231	−13	4
Burkina Faso	3	0	3	169	264	−95	3

21 August 2013
12:30

Boxscore

Rwanda	80–61	Burkina Faso
Scoring by quarter: 17–17, 15–21, 22–9, 26–14
Pts: Kabangu 24; Rebs: Kabangu 10; Asts: Ruhezamihigo 10		Pts: Bado 11; Rebs: Bayala 6 Asts: Ouattara, Savadogo 2

Palais des Sports de Treichville, Abidjan
Referees: Naftal Chongo (MOZ), Paulo Martinho (CPV), Armand Okoua (CGO)

21 August 2013
20:00

Boxscore

Tunisia	56–54	Morocco
Scoring by quarter: 16–16, 21–13, 12–12, 7–13
Pts: Ben Romdhane 21; Rebs: Ben Romdhane 11; Asts: Ghyaza 2		Pts: Rhalimi, Khalfi 10; Rebs: Rhalimi, Zouita 6 Asts: Zouita 4

Palais des Sports de Treichville, Abidjan
Referees: Abreu Mihimua (MOZ), Youssouf Maiga (MLI), Steve-Gaiton Koukou-Te-Ngbandi (CAF)

23 August 2013
12:30

Boxscore

Morocco	87–57	Rwanda
Scoring by quarter: 30–10, 20–15, 16–20, 21–12
Pts: Zouita 21; Rebs: Najah 9 Asts: Zouita 6		Pts: Gasana 22; Rebs: Suku Suku, Bradley 7 Asts: Gasana 3

Palais des Sports de Treichville, Abidjan
Referees: Carlos José Julio (ANG), Paulo Martinho (CPV), Youssouf Maiga (MLI)

23 August 2013
15:00

Boxscore

Burkina Faso	45–100	Tunisia
Scoring by quarter: 14–28, 10–28, 13–18, 8–26
Pts: Bado 14; Rebs: Diendere 6 Asts: Nissao 2		Pts: Ben Romdhane 23; Rebs: Ghyaza, Mejri 7 Asts: Kechrid 4

Palais des Sports de Treichville, Abidjan
Referees: Charles Foster (RSA), Armand Okoua (CGO), Steve-Gaiton Koukou-Te-Ngbandi (CAF)

25 August 2013
12:30

Boxscore

Burkina Faso	63–84	Morocco
Scoring by quarter: 16–13, 6–24, 16–24, 25–23
Pts: Ouattara 25; Rebs: Savadogo 7 Asts: Yameogo 4		Pts: Zouita 21; Rebs: Idrissi 4 Asts: Lahrichi 3

Palais des Sports de Treichville, Abidjan
Referees: Charles Foster (RSA), Paulo Martinho (CPV), Youssouf Maiga (MLI)

25 August 2013
17:30

Boxscore

Tunisia	83–81 (OT)	Rwanda
Scoring by quarter: 26–17, 13–24, 20–20, 15–13, Overtime: 9–7
Pts: Ben Romdhane 18; Rebs: Ben Romdhane, Mejri 12; Asts: Knioua 8		Pts: Gasana 22; Rebs: Kabangu 14; Asts: Gasana 7

Palais des Sports de Treichville, Abidjan
Referees: Naftal Chongo (MOZ), Kingsley Ojeaburu (NGR), Arnaud Kom Njilo (CMR)

=== Group C ===
Team	Pld	W	L	PF	PA	PD	Pts
Angola	3	3	0	251	203	+48	6
Cape Verde	3	2	1	205	210	−5	5
Mozambique	3	1	2	196	222	−26	4
Central African Republic	3	0	3	228	245	−17	3

20 August 2013
12:30

Boxscore

Central African Republic	66–70	Mozambique
Scoring by quarter: 17–8, 22–19, 12–28, 15–15
Pts: Kouguere 20; Rebs: Ghouzy 8 Asts: Kossangue 5		Pts: Matos 13; Rebs: Muchate, Magolico 8 Asts: Matos, Magolico 3

Palais des Sports de Treichville, Abidjan
Referees: Chlif Abdellilah (MAR), Wael Abdel Hay (EGY), Didier Shema-Maboko (RWA)

20 August 2013
20:00

Boxscore

Angola	75–50	Cape Verde
Scoring by quarter: 25–10, 13–18, 28–10, 9–12
Pts: Morais 21; Rebs: Gomes 7 Asts: Cipriano 6		Pts: Lima, Coronel 10; Rebs: three players 4 Asts: Rudolph, Jr. 2

Palais des Sports de Treichville, Abidjan
Referees: Nachid Messaoudi (ALG), Samir Abaakil (MAR), Kouadio N'Guessan (CIV)

22 August 2013
12:30

Boxscore

Cape Verde	90–82	Central African Republic
Scoring by quarter: 23–11, 22–27, 19–17, 26–27
Pts: Coronel, Mascarenhas 17; Rebs: Mascarenhas 12; Asts: Rudolph, Jr. 8		Pts: Mokongo 14; Rebs: Kouguere 8 Asts: Mokongo 5

Palais des Sports de Treichville, Abidjan
Referees: Chlif Abdellilah (MAR), Nachid Messaoudi (ALG), Nourou Djeri (TOG)

22 August 2013
20:00

Boxscore

Mozambique	73–91	Angola
Scoring by quarter: 14–17, 24–20, 13–23, 22–31
Pts: Letela 12; Rebs: Casnivete 6 Asts: Matos 3		Pts: Morais 16; Rebs: three players 5 Asts: Cipriano 5

Palais des Sports de Treichville, Abidjan
Referees: José Martin (ESP), Wael Abdel Hay (EGY), Babacar Gueye (SEN)

24 August 2013
12:30

Boxscore

Mozambique	53–65	Cape Verde
Scoring by quarter: 13–16, 14–19, 14–11, 12–19
Pts: Matos 12; Rebs: Mandlate 8 Asts: Mucavel 4		Pts: Coronel 18; Rebs: Mascarenhas 18; Asts: Rudolph, Jr. 4

Palais des Sports de Treichville, Abidjan
Referees: Nachid Messaoudi (ALG), Chlif Abdellilah (MAR), Sami Belgharek (TUN)

24 August 2013
20:00

Boxscore

Angola	85–80	Central African Republic
Scoring by quarter: 20–12, 23–22, 24–22, 18–24
Pts: Morais, Moore 18; Rebs: Mingas 9 Asts: Morais 6		Pts: White, Jr. 17; Rebs: Kouguere 6 Asts: Mokongo 8

Palais des Sports de Treichville, Abidjan
Referees: Wael Abdel Hay (EGY), Babacar Gueye (SEN), Nourou Djeri (TOG)

=== Group D ===
Team	Pld	W	L	PF	PA	PD	Pts
Nigeria	3	3	0	258	218	+40	6
Cameroon	3	2	1	247	169	+78	5
Congo	3	1	2	205	244	−39	4
Mali	3	0	3	171	250	−79	3

21 August 2013
15:00

Boxscore

Cameroon	74–43	Congo
Scoring by quarter: 18–9, 15–17, 21–8, 20–9
Pts: Aboya 16; Rebs: Essengué 9 Asts: Essengué 4		Pts: Dibessa 12; Rebs: Kondzy 10; Asts: three players 3

Palais des Sports de Treichville, Abidjan
Referees: Matej Boultauzer (SLO), Vitalis Gode (KEN), Babacar Gueye (SEN)

21 August 2013
17:30

Boxscore

Nigeria	74–59	Mali
Scoring by quarter: 14–18, 17–9, 16–19, 27–13
Pts: Diogu 19; Rebs: Al-F. Aminu 10; Asts: Uzoh 5		Pts: Boundy 21; Rebs: Haidara 7 Asts: Saounera 5

Palais des Sports de Treichville, Abidjan
Referees: José Martin (ESP), Sami Belgharek (TUN), Samir Abaakil (MAR)

23 August 2013
17:30

Boxscore

Congo	75–93	Nigeria
Scoring by quarter: 18–28, 14–25, 26–19, 17–21
Pts: Oniangue 19; Rebs: four players 4 Asts: Morlende 4		Pts: Ala. Aminu 23; Rebs: Diogu 12; Asts: Uzoh 5

Palais des Sports de Treichville, Abidjan
Referees: Kouadio N'Guessan (CIV), Samir Abaakil (MAR), Sami Belgharek (TUN)

23 August 2013
20:00

Boxscore

Mali	35–89	Cameroon
Scoring by quarter: 6–29, 6–20, 5–29, 18–11
Pts: Boundy 8 Rebs: Tangara, Diakité 6 Asts: Haidara 2		Pts: Nzeulie, Mbah a Moute 16; Rebs: four players 7 Asts: Pitard 5

Palais des Sports de Treichville, Abidjan
Referees: Matej Boltauzer (SLO), Vitalis Gode (KEN), Didier Shema-Maboko (RWA)

25 August 2013
15:00

Boxscore

Congo	87–77	Mali
Scoring by quarter: 24–18, 10–19, 29–18, 24–22
Pts: Oniangue 31; Rebs: Oniangue 7 Asts: Morlende 5		Pts: Niakate 22; Rebs: Haidara 10; Asts: three players 2

Palais des Sports de Treichville, Abidjan
Referees: Kouadio N'Guessan (CIV), Samir Abaakil (MAR), Didier Shema-Maboko (RWA)

25 August 2013
20:00

Boxscore

Nigeria	91–84	Cameroon
Scoring by quarter: 24–18, 15–22, 23–25, 29–19
Pts: Diogu 25; Rebs: Diogu 15; Asts: Al-F. Aminu 9		Pts: Bayang, Mbah a Moute 20; Rebs: four players 5 Asts: Pitard 5

Palais des Sports de Treichville, Abidjan
Referees: José Martin (ESP), Matej Boltauzer (SLO), Vitalis Gode (KEN)

== Knockout stage ==
Round of 16
26 August
Ivory Coast	100
Burkina Faso	60
26 August
Cameroon	75
Mozambique	42
26 August
Angola	82
Mali	36
26 August
Morocco (OT)	86
Algeria	81
27 August
Tunisia	67
Egypt	77
27 August
Cape Verde	67
Congo	60
27 August
Nigeria	112
Central African Republic	75
27 August
Senegal	67
Rwanda	57

Quarter-finals
28 August
Ivory Coast	71
Cameroon	56
28 August
Angola	95
Morocco	73
28 August
Egypt	74
Cape Verde	73
28 August
Nigeria	63
Senegal	64

Semi-finals
30 August
Ivory Coast	59
Angola	66
30 August
Egypt	70
Senegal	63

Final
31 August
Angola	57
Egypt	40
Third place
31 August
Ivory Coast	56
Senegal	57

5th place bracket

5–8th place semifinals
29 August
Cameroon	79
Morocco	76
29 August
Cape Verde	79
Nigeria	76

Fifth place game
30 August
Cameroon	74
Cape Verde	53
Seventh place game
30 August
Morocco	87
Nigeria	105

=== Round of 16 ===
26 August 2013
12:30

Boxscore

Morocco	86–81 (OT)	Algeria
Scoring by quarter: 14–12, 17–14, 18–24, 23–22, Overtime: 14–9
Pts: Khalfi 24; Rebs: Idrissi 13; Asts: Khalfi 4		Pts: Harat 25; Rebs: Touati 12; Asts: Kaouane 7

Palais des Sports de Treichville, Abidjan
Referees: Vitalis Gode (KEN), Charles Foster (RSA), Paulo Martinho (CPV)

26 August 2013
15:00

Boxscore

Cameroon	75–42	Mozambique
Scoring by quarter: 14–14, 21–8, 15–9, 25–11
Pts: Bayang, Essengué 13; Rebs: Mbah a Moute 7 Asts: Curti 5		Pts: Muchate 12; Rebs: Muchate, Mandlate 4 Asts: Muchate, Mandlate 2

Palais des Sports de Treichville, Abidjan
Referees: Matej Boltazeur (SLO), Nachid Messaoudi (ALG), Sami Belgharek (TUN)

26 August 2013
17:30

Boxscore

Ivory Coast	100–60	Burkina Faso
Scoring by quarter: 19–15, 26–13, 29–15, 26–17
Pts: Koné 20; Rebs: Koné 10; Asts: Diabate 6		Pts: Tapsoba 13; Rebs: Tapsoba 7 Asts: four players 2

Palais des Sports de Treichville, Abidjan
Referees: Chlif Abdellilah (MAR), Wael Abdel Hay (EGY), Nourou Djeri (TOG)

26 August 2013
20:00

Boxscore

Angola	82–36	Mali
Scoring by quarter: 29–5, 10–10, 18–9, 25–12
Pts: Almeida 14; Rebs: Costa 8 Asts: Morais 5		Pts: Niakate 14; Rebs: Tangara 6 Asts: three players 1

Palais des Sports de Treichville, Abidjan
Referees: José Martin (ESP), Kingsley Ojeaburu (NGR), Steve-Gaiton Koukou-Te-Ngbandi (CAF)

27 August 2013
12:30

Boxscore

Tunisia	67–77	Egypt
Scoring by quarter: 15–19, 13–16, 18–20, 21–22
Pts: Ben Romdhane 22; Rebs: Mejri 9 Asts: Knioua 5		Pts: Badr, El-Gammal 19; Rebs: Marei 8 Asts: Badr 3

Palais des Sports de Treichville, Abidjan
Referees: Vitalis Gode (KEN), Naftal Chongo (MOZ), Arnaud Kom Njilo (CMR)

27 August 2013
15:00

Boxscore

Cape Verde	67–60	Congo
Scoring by quarter: 11–21, 12–11, 15–18, 29–10
Pts: Coronel 15; Rebs: Coronel 9 Asts: Rudolph, Jr. 6		Pts: Morlende, Oniangue 14; Rebs: Kondzy 10; Asts: Morlende, Oniangue 4

Palais des Sports de Treichville, Abidjan
Referees: Nachid Messaoudi (ALG), Chlif Abdellilah (MAR), Kingsley Ojeaburu (NGR)

27 August 2013
17:30

Boxscore

Senegal	67–57	Rwanda
Scoring by quarter: 13–15, 20–20, 14–7, 20–15
Pts: Badji 18; Rebs: Badji 8 Asts: Ma. Ndoye 7		Pts: Kabangu 14; Rebs: Kabangu 12; Asts: three players 3

Palais des Sports de Treichville, Abidjan
Referees: José Martin (ESP), Samir Abaakil (MAR), Carlos José Julio (ANG)

27 August 2013
20:00

Boxscore

Nigeria	112–75	Central African Republic
Scoring by quarter: 24–27, 34–12, 26–15, 28–21
Pts: Okoye 29; Rebs: Ala. Aminu 10; Asts: Al-F. Aminu 4		Pts: Kouguere 22; Rebs: Kossangue 7 Asts: Mokongo 6

Palais des Sports de Treichville, Abidjan
Referees: Abreu Muhimua (MOZ), Matej Boltauzer (SLO), Charles Foster (RSA)

=== Quarterfinals ===
28 August 2013
12:30

Boxscore

Angola	95–73	Morocco
Scoring by quarter: 26–12, 24–16, 26–22, 19–23
Pts: Cipriano 16; Rebs: Gomes, Mingas 6 Asts: Costa 4		Pts: Zouita 25; Rebs: Najah, Idrissi 7 Asts: Khalfi, Zouita 4

Palais des Sports de Treichville, Abidjan
Referees: Wael Abdel Hay (EGY), Nourou Djeri (TOG), Didier Shema-Maboko (RWA)

28 August 2013
15:00

Boxscore

Egypt	74–73	Cape Verde
Scoring by quarter: 16–19, 20–21, 25–15, 13–18
Pts: Abd Alla 18; Rebs: Kamal 11; Asts: Badr 4		Pts: Rudolph, Jr. 19; Rebs: Coronel 9 Asts: Rudolph, Jr. 3

Palais des Sports de Treichville, Abidjan
Referees: Charles Fosterr (RSA), Arnaud Kom Njilo (CMR), Steve-Gaiton Koukou-Te-Ngbandi (CAF)

28 August 2013
17:30

Boxscore

Ivory Coast	71–56	Cameroon
Scoring by quarter: 24–14, 16–18, 10–15, 21–9
Pts: Diabate 19; Rebs: Lamizana 8 Asts: Diabate 6		Pts: Bayang 20; Rebs: Mbah a Moute 6 Asts: Curti 5

Palais des Sports de Treichville, Abidjan
Referees: Vitalis Gode (KEN), José Martin (ESP), Abreu Muhimua (MOZ)

28 August 2013
20:00

Boxscore

Nigeria	63–64	Senegal
Scoring by quarter: 25–16, 12–19, 12–19, 14–10
Pts: Ala. Aminu 18; Rebs: Diogu 10; Asts: Al-F. Aminu 8		Pts: Mam. Ndoye 13; Rebs: Sene 8 Asts: Faye 4

Palais des Sports de Treichville, Abidjan
Referees: Matej Boltauzer (SLO), Chlif Abdellilah (MAR), Samir Abaakil (MAR)

=== 5–8th place semifinals ===
29 August 2013
10:00

Boxscore

Cameroon	79–76	Morocco
Scoring by quarter: 22–16, 20–17, 24–25, 13–18
Pts: Essengué 18; Rebs: Essengué 7 Asts: Curti 9		Pts: Zouita 27; Rebs: Najah, Zouita 6 Asts: Khalfi 5

Palais des Sports de Treichville, Abidjan
Referees: Kouadio N'Guessan (CIV), Carlos José Julio (ANG), Naftal Chongo (MOZ)

29 August 2013
12:30

Boxscore

Cape Verde	79–76	Nigeria
Scoring by quarter: 21–23, 16–17, 17–15, 25–21
Pts: Correia 16; Rebs: Coronel 11; Asts: Rudolph, Jr. 8		Pts: Diogu 22; Rebs: Diogu 10; Asts: Uzoh 7

Palais des Sports de Treichville, Abidjan
Referees: Nachid Messaoudi (ALG), Wael Abdel Hay (EGY), Sami Belgharek (TUN)

=== Semifinals ===
30 August 2013
16:00

Boxscore

Ivory Coast	59–66	Angola
Scoring by quarter: 10–23, 26–10, 10–21, 13–12
Pts: Lamizana 15; Rebs: Koné 8 Asts: Diabate 3		Pts: Morais, Moore 13; Rebs: Mingas 9 Asts: Gomes 5

Palais des Sports de Treichville, Abidjan
Referees: Matej Boltauzer (SLO), Samir Abaakil (MAR), Nachid Messaoudi (ALG)

30 August 2013
18:30

Boxscore

Egypt	70–63	Senegal
Scoring by quarter: 20–15, 8–9, 14–15, 28–24
Pts: Marei 22; Rebs: Marei 17; Asts: Badr 3		Pts: Mal. Ndoye 12; Rebs: Sene 11; Asts: three players 3

Palais des Sports de Treichville, Abidjan
Referees: Vitalis Gode (KEN), Chlif Abdellilah (MAR), Charles Foster (RSA)

=== Fifteenth place match ===
28 August 2013
09:00

Boxscore

Mali	71–70 (OT)	Burkina Faso
Scoring by quarter: 11–19, 17–9, 16–21, 20–15, Overtime: 7–6
Pts: Niakate 20; Rebs: Haidara 11; Asts: Niakate, Haidara 4		Pts: Durham 18; Rebs: Ouattara 10; Asts: Ouattara, Yameogo 3

Palais des Sports de Treichville, Abidjan
Referees: Nachid Messaoudi (ALG), Kingsley Ojeaburu (NGR), Armand Okoua (CGO)

=== Thirteenth place match ===
28 August 2013
11:30

Boxscore

Congo	63–64	Central African Republic
Scoring by quarter: 16–10, 12–16, 17–21, 18–17
Pts: Mouesse 16; Rebs: Moupegnou 10; Asts: Morlende 6		Pts: Kouguere 22; Rebs: Siris 8 Asts: Ghouzy 3

Palais des Sports de Treichville, Abidjan
Referees: Naftal Chongo (MOZ), Sami Belgharek (TUN), Youssouf Maiga (MLI)

=== Eleventh place match ===
28 August 2013
14:00

Boxscore

Algeria	56–78	Mozambique
Scoring by quarter: 13–13, 11–26, 18–19, 14–20
Pts: Gaham 13; Rebs: Cheriet 14; Asts: Kaouane 4		Pts: Magolico 17; Rebs: Magolico 8 Asts: Matos 4

Palais des Sports de Treichville, Abidjan
Referees: Kouadio N'Guessan (CIV), Babacar Gueye (SEN), Armand Okoua (CGO)

=== Ninth place match ===
28 August 2013
16:30

Boxscore

Tunisia	76–54	Rwanda
Scoring by quarter: 23–13, 12–25, 23–8, 18–8
Pts: El Mabrouk 18; Rebs: Mouhli 6 Asts: four players 2		Pts: Suku Suku, Kabangu 10; Rebs: Kabangu 7 Asts: Ruhezamihigo 6

Palais des Sports de Treichville, Abidjan
Referees: Carlos José Julio (ANG), Paulo Martinho (CPV), Youssouf Maiga (MLI)

=== Seventh place match ===
30 August 2013
11:30

Boxscore

Morocco	87–105	Nigeria
Scoring by quarter: 17–19, 24–31, 25–28, 21–27
Pts: Zouita 21; Rebs: four players 3 Asts: Khalfi, Zouita 4		Pts: Diogu 31; Rebs: Diogu 10; Asts: Uzoh 9

Palais des Sports de Treichville, Abidjan
Referees: José Martin (ESP), Paulo Martinho (CPV), Armand Okoua (CGO)

=== Fifth place match ===
30 August 2013
14:00

Boxscore

Cameroon	74–53	Cape Verde
Scoring by quarter: 21–9, 24–20, 10–17, 19–7
Pts: Essengué 19; Rebs: Essengué 7 Asts: Pitard 7		Pts: Rudolph, Jr. 15; Rebs: Coronel 10; Asts: Rudolph, Jr. 5

Palais des Sports de Treichville, Abidjan
Referees: Wael Abdel Hay (EGY), Nourou Djeri (TOG), Didier Shema-Maboko (RWA)

=== Third place match ===
31 August 2013
16:00

Boxscore

Ivory Coast	56–57	Senegal
Scoring by quarter: 16–9, 8–23, 19–11, 13–14
Pts: Soumahoro 14; Rebs: Lamizana 8 Asts: Diabate, Lamizana 4		Pts: Diop 11; Rebs: Ndiaye 6 Asts: Mal. Ndoye 6

Palais des Sports de Treichville, Abidjan
Referees: Carlos José Julio (ANG), Samir Abaakil (MAR), Charles Foster (RSA)

=== Final ===
31 August 2013
18:30

Boxscore

Angola	57–40	Egypt
Scoring by quarter: 12–13, 16–8, 18–7, 11–12
Pts: Morais 21; Rebs: Mingas 12; Asts: Costa 3		Pts: Abd Alla 15; Rebs: Marei 8 Asts: El-Sabagh 2

Palais des Sports de Treichville, Abidjan
Referees: Vitalis Gode (KEN), Matej Boltauzer (SLO), Arnaud Kom Njilo (CMR)

== Final standings ==
Qualified for the 2014 FIBA Basketball World Cup

Rank	Team	Record
1	Angola	7–0
2	Egypt	3–4
3	Senegal	5–2
4	Ivory Coast	5–2
5	Cameroon	5–2
6	Cape Verde	4–3
7	Nigeria	5–2
8	Morocco	3–4
9	Tunisia	4–1
10	Rwanda	1–4
11	Mozambique	2–3
12	Algeria	1–4
13	Central African Republic	1–4
14	Congo	1–4
15	Mali	1–4
16	Burkina Faso	0–5

== Awards ==
2013 FIBA Africa Championship winners

Angola
Eleventh title

Most Valuable Player
(Angola) Carlos Morais

=== All-Tournament Team ===
- (Ivory Coast) Souleymane Diabate
- (Angola) Carlos Morais
- (Senegal) Maleye Ndoye
- (Angola) Eduardo Mingas
- (Egypt) Assem Marei

== Statistical leaders ==
Points

Rank	Name	G	Pts	PPG
1	(Nigeria) Ike Diogu	7	153	21.9
2	(Morocco) Abdelhakim Zouita	7	140	20
3	(Central African Republic) Max Kouguere	5	92	18.4
4	(Tunisia) Makrem Ben Romdhane	5	89	17.8
5	(Rwanda) Kenny Gasana	5	84	16.8
6	(Morocco) Younes Idrissi	7	111	15.9
6	(Angola) Carlos Morais	7	111	15.9
8	(Nigeria) Alade Aminu	7	107	15.3
9	(Republic of the Congo) Giovan Oniangue	5	74	14.8
10	(Egypt) Assem Marei	7	102	14.6

Rebounds

Rank	Name	G	Rbs	RPG
1	(Egypt) Assem Marei	7	81	11.6
2	(Nigeria) Ike Diogu	7	72	10.3
3	(Rwanda) Kami Kabangu	5	49	9.8
4	(Tunisia) Salah Mejri	4	35	8.8
5	(Algeria) Sedik Touati	5	43	8.6
6	(Algeria) Mehdi Cheriet	5	40	8
7	(Tunisia) Makrem Ben Romdhane	5	36	7.2
7	(Algeria) Mohamed Harat	5	36	7.2
7	(Cape Verde) Rodrigo Mascarenhas	5	36	7.2
10	(Mali) Ibrahima Haidara	5	35	7

Assists

Rank	Name	G	Ast	APG
1	(Nigeria) Al-Farouq Aminu	7	37	5.3
2	(Cape Verde) Brian Rudolph Jr	7	36	5.1
3	(Nigeria) Ben Uzoh	7	35	5
4	(Algeria) Abdelhalim Kaouane	5	25	5
4	(Rwanda) Hamza Ruhezamihigo	5	25	5
6	(Central African Republic) Michael Mokongo	4	20	5
7	(Ivory Coast) Souleymane Diabate	7	32	4.6
8	(Cameroon) Aldo Curti	7	28	4
9	(Republic of the Congo) Kris Morlende	5	20	4
10	(Morocco) Mustapha Kalfi	7	24	3.4

Steals

Rank	Name	G	Stl	SPG
1	(Cameroon) Christian Bayang	7	28	4
2	(Ivory Coast) Souleymane Diabate	7	17	2.4
3	(Tunisia) Makrem Ben Romdhane	5	12	2.4
3	(Rwanda) Kenny Gasana	5	12	2.4
5	(Nigeria) Al-Farouq Aminu	7	16	2.3
6	(Angola) Olímpio Cipriano	6	13	2.2
7	(Republic of the Congo) Jean-Felix Moupegnou	5	11	2.2
8	(Mali) Namory Boundy	5	10	2
8	(Mozambique) Pio Matos	5	10	2
10	(Republic of the Congo) Ruddy Okemba	5	9	1.8

Blocks

Rank	Name	G	Blk	BPG
1	(Ivory Coast) Mamadou Lamizana	7	17	2.4
2	(Senegal) Hamady N'diaye	7	15	2.1
3	(Tunisia) Salah Mejri	4	8	2
4	(Cape Verde) Walter da Veiga	7	11	1.6
5	(Burkina Faso) Ali Tapsoba	5	8	1.6
6	(Algeria) Sedik Touati	5	7	1.4
7	(Senegal) Saer Sene	7	9	1.3
8	(Central African Republic) Johan Grebongo	5	5	1
8	(Mozambique) Edson Monjane	5	5	1
8	(Republic of the Congo) Karl Niamamoukoko	5	5	1

Minutes

Rank	Name	G	Min	MPG
1	(Rwanda) Kami Kabangu	5	191	38.2
2	(Rwanda) Kenny Gasana	5	181	36.2
2	(Central African Republic) Max Kouguere	5	181	36.2
4	(Mali) Namory Boundy	5	173	34.6
5	(Algeria) Abdelhalim Kaouane	5	171	34.2
5	(Republic of the Congo) Giovan Oniangue	5	171	34.2
7	(Rwanda) Cameron Bradley	5	170	34
7	(Algeria) Mehdi Cheriet	5	170	34
9	(Cape Verde) Brian Rudolph Jr	7	236	33.7
10	(Nigeria) Ben Uzoh	7	230	32.9

== See also ==
- 2013 FIBA Africa Clubs Champions Cup
