= Burkina Faso men's national basketball team =

Burkina Faso
- FIBA ranking: ▲ (3 March 2026)
- Joined FIBA: 1964
- FIBA zone: FIBA Africa
- National federation: Fédération Burkinabe de Basketball
- Coach: Bagouhinisse Dah
- Nickname: Stallions

Olympic Games
- Appearances: None

FIBA World Cup
- Appearances: None

FIBA Africa Championship
- Appearances: 1 (2013)
- Medals: None
Home	Away

The Burkina Faso national basketball team is the national basketball team of Burkina Faso, governed by the Fédération Burkinabe de Basketball.

Its main accomplishment was the qualification for the 2013 FIBA Africa Championship.

== History ==
The qualification to the AfroBasket 2013 in Abidjan, Ivory Coast remains Burkina Faso's main accomplishment. Since then, the Burkina Faso "Stallions" have attempted to make a comeback. The Burkinabé did not make it through the AfroBasket 2015 qualification. In early 2021, they withdrew from the AfroBasket 2021 qualification. Burkina Faso has often struggled with the strong regional competition from neighbouring countries like Nigeria and Cote d'Ivoire in the African qualifying Zone 3.

The 1.80 m (5 ft 11 in) Point guard Herve Yaméogo had been team captain for many years. In a 2020 interview, the four-time champions with local side RCK highlighted the presence of Burkinabé national team players who play in Europe like Jean Victor Traore, Joris Bado and also others who play for universities in United States. Yet, he mentioned the failure of others who did not identify with their home nation. Yameogo further stressed the inequality of financial assistance from the government compared to association football. Burkina Faso has the Palais des Sports de Ouaga 2000 which hosted the AfroBasket 2013 qualification and qualification games of the FIBA Africa Basketball League. According to Yaméogo, with better financing, it can host bigger basketball events.

== Competitive record ==
=== FIBA AfroBasket ===
Burkina Faso has played at the AfroBasket main tournament once, in 2013.

AfroBasket record						Qualification record			
Year	Round	Position	GP	W	L	GP	W	L	–
(Morocco) 1964	Did not qualify								
(Tunisia) 1965	Did not qualify								
(Morocco) 1968	Did not qualify								
(Egypt) 1970	Did not qualify								
(Senegal) 1972	Did not qualify								
(Central African Republic) 1974	Did not qualify								
(Egypt) 1975	Did not qualify								
(Senegal) 1978	Did not qualify								
(Morocco) 1980	Did not qualify								
(Somalia) 1981	Did not qualify								
(Egypt) 1983	Did not qualify								
(Ivory Coast) 1985	Did not qualify								
(Tunisia) 1987	Did not qualify								
(Angola) 1989	Did not qualify								
(Egypt) 1992	Did not qualify								
(Kenya) 1993	Did not qualify								
(Algeria) 1995	Did not qualify								
(Senegal) 1997	Did not qualify								
(Angola) 1999	Did not qualify								
(Morocco) 2001	Did not qualify								
(Egypt) 2003	Did not qualify								
(Algeria) 2005	Did not qualify								
(Angola) 2007	Did not qualify								
(Libya) 2009	Did not qualify					Did not enter			
(Madagascar) 2011	Did not qualify					Did not enter			
(Ivory Coast) 2013	Round of 16	16th	5	0	5	2	1	1	2013
(Tunisia) 2015	Did not qualify					2	0	2	2015
(Tunisia) (Senegal) 2017	Did not qualify					4	1	3	2017
(Rwanda) 2021	Did not qualify					Did not enter			
(Angola) 2025	Did not qualify					Did not enter			
Total	1/29		5	0	5	8	2	6	–

=== African Games ===
Burkina Faso played at the African Games once, in 1973. Beginning with the 2019 event, regular basketball was replaced by 3x3 basketball.

African Games record
Year	Round	Position	GP	W	L
(Nigeria) 1973	No data available				
(Algeria) 1978	Did not enter				
(Kenya) 1987	Did not enter				
(Egypt) 1991	Did not enter				
(Zimbabwe) 1995	Did not enter				
(South Africa) 1999	Did not enter				
(Nigeria) 2003	Did not enter				
(Algeria) 2007	Did not enter				
(Mozambique) 2011	Did not enter				
(Republic of the Congo) 2015	Did not enter				

== Current roster ==
Team for the AfroBasket 2017 qualification: (last publicized squad)

Burkina Faso men's national basketball team roster
Players
Coaches

Pos.	No.	Name	Age – Date of birth	Height	Club
	4	Wilfried Zerbo	31 – 1 August 1985		AS Sonabhy	(Burkina Faso)
F/C	5	Moussa Ouattara	28 – 5 April 1988	2.02 m (6 ft 8 in)	CEP Fleurus	(Belgium)
	6	Yaya Diarra	28 – 14 March 1989		Rail Club Kadiogo	(Burkina Faso)
	7	Ismael Palingwinde Raymond Ouedraogo	28 – 7 January 1989
	8	Francois Belemkogba	29 – 4 October 1987
	9	Nassirou Kere	25 – 24 August 1991		USFRAN	(Burkina Faso)
G/F	10	Stephane Nissao	21 – 31 October 1995	1.97 m (6 ft 6 in)	Lagos Warriors	(Nigeria)
F	11	Herve Yameogo	34 – 27 March 1982	1.80 m (5 ft 11 in)	Rail Club Kadiogo	(Burkina Faso)
G/F	12	Joris Bado	25 – 20 May 1991	1.93 m (6 ft 4 in)	Basket Club Montbrison	(France)
	13	Dofinitetuan Bihoun	24 – 22 September 1992
C	15	Mamadou Savadogo	38 – 17 April 1978	2.02 m (6 ft 8 in)	Mark Mentors	(Nigeria)

Head coach

- (Burkina Faso) Bagouhinisse Dah

Assistant coach(es)

- (Senegal) Amadou Ba

Legend

- Club – describes last
  club before the tournament
- Age – describes age
  on 26 March 2017

== Past Rosters ==
Team for the 2015 Afrobasket Qualification:

Burkina Faso men's national basketball team roster
Players
Coaches

Pos.	No.	Name	Age – Date of birth	Height	Club
		Joris Ambroise Bruno Bado	24 – 20 May 1991	1.93 m (6 ft 4 in)	Cognac BB	(France)
		Yesharh Louis Alfred Clément Bado	20 – 19 August 1994			(Burkina Faso)
		Dofinitetuan Camille Bihoun	22 – 22 September 1992			(Burkina Faso)
		Ibrahim Cisse	30 – 24 December 1984
		Yaya Diarra	26 – 14 March 1989			(Burkina Faso)
		Gilles Saalim Diendere	25 – 23 January 1990	1.98 m (6 ft 6 in)	SLUC Nancy 2nd Team	(France)
		Abdoul-Hakim Demba Fofana	19 – 11 June 1996
		Ange Fayçal Kabre	20 – 24 September 1994
		Nassirou Kere	23 – 24 August 1991			(Burkina Faso)
		Bienvenue Stephane Rachid Nissao	19 – 31 October 1995	1.97 m (6 ft 6 in)	A.S.T.Y.	(Burkina Faso)
F/C		Moussa Ouattara	27 – 5 April 1988	2.02 m (6 ft 8 in)	ASTE Kain	(Belgium)
		Moussa Robert Ouattara	23 – 27 September 1991			(Burkina Faso)
		Armel Ouedraogo	22 – 21 July 1993
		Ismael Palingwinde Raymond Ouedraogo	26 – 7 January 1989			(Burkina Faso)
		Dô Ambroise Judicaël Sanon	20 – 7 December 1994
		Mamadou Savadogo	37 – 17 April 1978	2.02 m (6 ft 8 in)	AS Sonabhy	(Burkina Faso)
		Ali Kader Ismael Tapsoba	27 – 12 September 1987	2.08 m (6 ft 10 in)	Texas Tech Red Raiders basketball	(United States)
PF		Jean-Victor Traore	30 – 20 June 1985	2.03 m (6 ft 8 in)	Lille Métropole BC	(France)
		Hervé Yameogo	33 – 27 March 1982	1.80 m (5 ft 11 in)	Rail Club Kadiogo	(Burkina Faso)
		Basnewende Brice Fulgence Zoungrana	22 – 8 September 1992			(Burkina Faso)

Legend

- Club – describes last
  club before the tournament
- Age – describes age
  on 20 August 2013

Team for the 2013 FIBA Africa Championship:

Burkina Faso men's national basketball team roster
Players
Coaches

Pos.	No.	Name	Age – Date of birth	Height	Club
C	4	Moussa Ouattara	25 – 5 April 1988	2.02 m (6 ft 8 in)
C	5	Jean Paul Bayala	26 – 3 April 1987	2.00 m (6 ft 7 in)
G	6	Derek Leotis Durham	39 – 13 June 1974	1.77 m (5 ft 10 in)
F	7	Herve Yameogo	31 – 27 March 1982	1.96 m (6 ft 5 in)
	8	Mohamed Traore	28 – 9 January 1985
C	9	Samuel Ouedraogo	26 – 15 March 1987	2.08 m (6 ft 10 in)
	10	Emmanuel Pooda	27 – 29 August 1985
F	11	Joris Bado	22 – 20 May 1991	1.92 m (6 ft 4 in)
F	12	Kader Tapsoba	25 – 12 September 1987	2.09 m (6 ft 10 in)	AS Swallows
	13	Stephane Nissao	17 – 31 October 1995
G	14	Gilles Diendere	23 – 23 January 1990	1.91 m (6 ft 3 in)
	15	Mamadou Savadogo	35 – 17 April 1978		AS Swallows
G	16	Kieran Pender	20 – 17 April 1993	1.93 m (6 ft 4 in)	Purple Cobras

Head coach

- Jean-Paul Rebatet

Legend

- Club – describes last
  club before the tournament
- Age – describes age
  on 20 August 2013

== Head coach position ==
- (France) Jean-Paul Rabatet – 2013
- (Burkina Faso) Bagouhinisse Dah - 2017

== Kit ==
=== Manufacturer ===
2013: Adidas

== See also ==
- Burkina Faso national under-19 basketball team
- Burkina Faso national under-17 basketball team
- Burkina Faso national 3x3 team
- Burkina Faso women's national basketball team
