= 2012 African Men's Junior Handball Championship =

Tournament details
- Host country: Ivory Coast
- Venue(s): 1 (in 1 host city)
- Dates: August 28– September 2
- Teams: 11 (from 1 confederation)

Final positions
- Champions: Tunisia (3rd title)
- Runner-up: Congo
- Third place: Egypt
- Fourth place: Angola

Tournament statistics
- Matches played: 30
- Goals scored: 1,498 (49.93 per match)

The 2012 African Men's Junior Handball Championship was the 18th edition of the tournament, organized by the African Handball Confederation, under the auspices of the International Handball Federation and held in Abidjan, Ivory Coast from August 28 to September 2, 2012.

Tunisia was the champion and the tournament qualified the top five teams to the 2013 world championship.

== Draw ==
Group A	Group B
Angola; Gabon; Ivory Coast; Mali; Tunisia	Algeria; Congo; Egypt; Guinea; Libya; Morocco

== Preliminary round ==
11 teams were drawn into two groups of five and six, respectively, with the two top teams of each group playing for the title, the two second, playing for the bronze medal, the two third, playing for the 5th place, the two fourth for the 7th place and the two fifth teams playing for the 7th place.

All times are local (UTC+1).

=== Group A ===
Team	Pld	W	D	L	GF	GA	GD	Pts
Tunisia	5	4	1	0	134	58	+76	9
Angola	5	3	1	1	118	88	+30	7
Gabon	5	3	0	2	100	106	−6	6
Mali	5	2	0	3	67	123	−56	4
Ivory Coast	5	2	0	3	70	114	−44	4

28 August 2012; 11:00	Mali	08 – 43	Tunisia	Palais des Sports de Treichville, Abidjan
28 August 2012; 11:00	n/a	(05–21)	n/a	Palais des Sports de Treichville, Abidjan

18:00	Ivory Coast	12 – 24	Gabon	Palais des Sports de Treichville, Abidjan; Referees: Datongji, Hangbe (BEN)
18:00	Nguessan 4	(02–09)	Aubiang, Ousman 5	Palais des Sports de Treichville, Abidjan; Referees: Datongji, Hangbe (BEN)
18:00	2× (yellow card) 4× (suspension)	Report	3× (yellow card) 3× (suspension)	Palais des Sports de Treichville, Abidjan; Referees: Datongji, Hangbe (BEN)

29 August 2012; 16:00	Angola	37 – 28	Gabon	Palais des Sports de Treichville, Abidjan; Referees: Diabate, Coulibaly (CIV)
29 August 2012; 16:00	A.Lopes 9	(16–16)	Nguema 6	Palais des Sports de Treichville, Abidjan; Referees: Diabate, Coulibaly (CIV)
29 August 2012; 16:00	4× (yellow card) 7× (suspension) 1× (red card)	Report	2× (yellow card) 1× (suspension)	Palais des Sports de Treichville, Abidjan; Referees: Diabate, Coulibaly (CIV)

18:00	Tunisia	36 – 14	Ivory Coast	Palais des Sports de Treichville, Abidjan; Referees: Camara, Diakite (GUI)
18:00	Frad, Soussi 6	(19–06)	Traore 4	Palais des Sports de Treichville, Abidjan; Referees: Camara, Diakite (GUI)
18:00	1× (yellow card)	Report	1× (yellow card) 3× (suspension)	Palais des Sports de Treichville, Abidjan; Referees: Camara, Diakite (GUI)

30 August 2012; 10:00	Angola	33 – 17	Mali	Palais des Sports de Treichville, Abidjan; Referees: Datongji, Hangbe (BEN)
30 August 2012; 10:00	Amarelo 10	(13–10)	Bamba, Doumbia 4	Palais des Sports de Treichville, Abidjan; Referees: Datongji, Hangbe (BEN)
30 August 2012; 10:00	2× (yellow card) 4× (suspension)	Report	3× (yellow card) 10× (suspension) 1× (red card)	Palais des Sports de Treichville, Abidjan; Referees: Datongji, Hangbe (BEN)

14:00	Tunisia	32 – 15	Gabon	Palais des Sports de Treichville, Abidjan
14:00	n/a	(18–08)	n/a	Palais des Sports de Treichville, Abidjan

31 August 2012; 10:00	Gabon	33 – 25	Mali	Palais des Sports de Treichville, Abidjan
31 August 2012; 10:00	n/a	(19–11)	n/a	Palais des Sports de Treichville, Abidjan

18:00	Angola	27 – 20	Ivory Coast	Palais des Sports de Treichville, Abidjan; Referees: Camara, Diakite (GUI)
18:00	Edgar 11	(13–08)	three players 4	Palais des Sports de Treichville, Abidjan; Referees: Camara, Diakite (GUI)
18:00	3× (yellow card) 3× (suspension)	Report	3× (yellow card) 2× (suspension)	Palais des Sports de Treichville, Abidjan; Referees: Camara, Diakite (GUI)

1 September 2012; 14:00	Tunisia	23 – 21	Angola	Palais des Sports de Treichville, Abidjan; Referees: Coulibaly, Diabate (CIV)
1 September 2012; 14:00	Mhadhbi 5	(11–07)	Mário 8	Palais des Sports de Treichville, Abidjan; Referees: Coulibaly, Diabate (CIV)
1 September 2012; 14:00	2× (yellow card) 3× (suspension)	Report	2× (yellow card) 6× (suspension)	Palais des Sports de Treichville, Abidjan; Referees: Coulibaly, Diabate (CIV)

18:00	Mali	27 – 24	Ivory Coast	Palais des Sports de Treichville, Abidjan; Referees: Hizaki, Ikebuchi (JPN)
18:00	Bamba 9	(12–12)	Kouame 6	Palais des Sports de Treichville, Abidjan; Referees: Hizaki, Ikebuchi (JPN)
18:00	3× (yellow card) 6× (suspension) 1× (red card)	Report	3× (yellow card) 8× (suspension) 1× (red card)	Palais des Sports de Treichville, Abidjan; Referees: Hizaki, Ikebuchi (JPN)

=== Group B ===
Team	Pld	W	D	L	GF	GA	GD	Pts
Congo	5	5	0	0	107	97	+10	10
Egypt	5	4	0	1	177	110	+67	8
Algeria	5	2	0	3	139	121	+18	4
Libya	5	2	0	3	115	119	−4	4
Morocco	5	2	0	3	111	114	−3	4
Guinea	5	0	0	5	96	184	−88	0

28 August 2012; 09:00	Algeria	35 – 22	Guinea	Palais des Sports de Treichville, Abidjan
28 August 2012; 09:00	n/a	(19–11)	n/a	Palais des Sports de Treichville, Abidjan

13:00	Egypt	36 – 20	Libya	Palais des Sports de Treichville, Abidjan
13:00	n/a	(17–07)	n/a	Palais des Sports de Treichville, Abidjan

15:00	Morocco	20 – 15	Congo	Palais des Sports de Treichville, Abidjan
15:00	n/a	(09–05)	n/a	Palais des Sports de Treichville, Abidjan

29 August 2012; 10:00	Guinea	14 – 34	Morocco	Palais des Sports de Treichville, Abidjan; Referees: Angue, Gwangua (GAB)
29 August 2012; 10:00	Bangoura 5	(04–18)	Bouhaddioui 8	Palais des Sports de Treichville, Abidjan; Referees: Angue, Gwangua (GAB)
29 August 2012; 10:00	4× (yellow card) 5× (suspension)	Report	3× (yellow card) 3× (suspension)	Palais des Sports de Treichville, Abidjan; Referees: Angue, Gwangua (GAB)

12:00	Congo	25 – 22	Egypt	Palais des Sports de Treichville, Abidjan; Referees: Bonguino, Ndam (CMR)
12:00	Mobombo 8	(14–13)	Alaa 5	Palais des Sports de Treichville, Abidjan; Referees: Bonguino, Ndam (CMR)
12:00	3× (yellow card) 3× (suspension)	Report	4× (yellow card) 4× (suspension)	Palais des Sports de Treichville, Abidjan; Referees: Bonguino, Ndam (CMR)

14:00	Libya	21 – 25	Algeria	Palais des Sports de Treichville, Abidjan; Referees: Krichene, Makhlouf (TUN)
14:00	Krijntjes, Ali 6	(11–11)	Daoud 8	Palais des Sports de Treichville, Abidjan; Referees: Krichene, Makhlouf (TUN)
14:00	2× (yellow card) 1× (suspension)	Report	4× (yellow card) 4× (suspension)	Palais des Sports de Treichville, Abidjan; Referees: Krichene, Makhlouf (TUN)

30 August 2012; 12:00	Egypt	50 – 19	Guinea	Palais des Sports de Treichville, Abidjan
30 August 2012; 12:00	n/a	(24–09)	n/a	Palais des Sports de Treichville, Abidjan

16:00	Libya	18 – 21	Congo	Palais des Sports de Treichville, Abidjan
16:00	n/a	(12–11)	n/a	Palais des Sports de Treichville, Abidjan

18:00	Algeria	27 – 20	Morocco	Palais des Sports de Treichville, Abidjan
18:00	n/a	(13–11)	n/a	Palais des Sports de Treichville, Abidjan

31 August 2012; 12:00	Guinea	19 – 35	Libya	Palais des Sports de Treichville, Abidjan
31 August 2012; 12:00	n/a	(13–17)	n/a	Palais des Sports de Treichville, Abidjan

14:00	Algeria	25 – 26	Congo	Palais des Sports de Treichville, Abidjan
14:00	n/a	(15–11)	n/a	Palais des Sports de Treichville, Abidjan

16:00	Morocco	19 – 37	Egypt	Palais des Sports de Treichville, Abidjan; Referees: Krichene, Makhlouf (TUN)
16:00	Bentaleb, Bouhaddioui 7	(09–16)	Tamer 10	Palais des Sports de Treichville, Abidjan; Referees: Krichene, Makhlouf (TUN)
16:00	3× (yellow card) 3× (suspension)	Report	2× (yellow card) 3× (suspension)	Palais des Sports de Treichville, Abidjan; Referees: Krichene, Makhlouf (TUN)

1 September 2012; 10:00	Morocco	18 – 21	Libya	Palais des Sports de Treichville, Abidjan
1 September 2012; 10:00	n/a	(07–09)	n/a	Palais des Sports de Treichville, Abidjan

12:00	Congo	30 – 22	Guinea	Palais des Sports de Treichville, Abidjan; Referees: Adje, Daple (CIV)
12:00	Mobombo 11	(14–10)	Bangoura 6	Palais des Sports de Treichville, Abidjan; Referees: Adje, Daple (CIV)
12:00	4× (yellow card) 6× (suspension) 1× (red card)	Report	4× (yellow card) 9× (suspension)	Palais des Sports de Treichville, Abidjan; Referees: Adje, Daple (CIV)

16:00	Egypt	32 – 27	Algeria	Palais des Sports de Treichville, Abidjan; Referees: Krichene, Makhlouf (TUN)
16:00	Osama 10	(14–15)	Djellabi 8	Palais des Sports de Treichville, Abidjan; Referees: Krichene, Makhlouf (TUN)
16:00	3× (yellow card)	Report	3× (yellow card) 1× (suspension)	Palais des Sports de Treichville, Abidjan; Referees: Krichene, Makhlouf (TUN)

== Classification matches ==
=== Ninth place game ===
2 September 2012; 09:00	Ivory Coast	19 – 25	Morocco	Palais des Sports de Treichville, Abidjan
2 September 2012; 09:00	n/a	(11–15)	n/a	Palais des Sports de Treichville, Abidjan

=== Seventh place game ===
2 September 2012; 11:00	Libya	28 – 19	Mali	Palais des Sports de Treichville, Abidjan
2 September 2012; 11:00	n/a	(12–07)	n/a	Palais des Sports de Treichville, Abidjan

=== Fifth place game ===
2 September 2012; 13:00	Gabon	25 – 33	Algeria	Palais des Sports de Treichville, Abidjan; Referees: Adje, Daple (CIV)
2 September 2012; 13:00	Polman 6	(10–14)	Dias 8	Palais des Sports de Treichville, Abidjan; Referees: Adje, Daple (CIV)
2 September 2012; 13:00	3× (yellow card) 2× (suspension)	Report	3× (yellow card) 5× (suspension) 1× (red card)	Palais des Sports de Treichville, Abidjan; Referees: Adje, Daple (CIV)

=== Third place game ===
2 September 2012; 15:00	Angola	22 – 27	Egypt	Palais des Sports de Treichville, Abidjan; Referees: Krichene, Makhlouf (TUN)
2 September 2012; 15:00	Amarelo 7	(11–13)	Osama 7	Palais des Sports de Treichville, Abidjan; Referees: Krichene, Makhlouf (TUN)
2 September 2012; 15:00	3× (yellow card) 3× (suspension)	Report	4× (yellow card) 8× (suspension)	Palais des Sports de Treichville, Abidjan; Referees: Krichene, Makhlouf (TUN)

=== Final ===
2 September 2012; 17:30	Tunisia	41 – 25	Congo	Palais des Sports de Treichville, Abidjan; Referees: Coulibaly, Diabate (CIV)
2 September 2012; 17:30	Fathallah, Trabelsi 5	(22–10)	Mobombo 11	Palais des Sports de Treichville, Abidjan; Referees: Coulibaly, Diabate (CIV)
2 September 2012; 17:30	4× (yellow card) 7× (suspension)	Report	3× (yellow card) 3× (suspension)	Palais des Sports de Treichville, Abidjan; Referees: Coulibaly, Diabate (CIV)

== Final standings ==
Qualified for the 2013 World Championship

Rank	Team	Record
Gold medal	Tunisia	5–1–0
Silver medal	Congo	5–0–1
Bronze medal	Egypt	5–0–1
4	Angola	3–1–2
5	Algeria	3–0–3
6	Gabon	3–0–3
7	Libya	3–0–3
8	Mali	2–0–4
9	Morocco	3–0–3
10	Ivory Coast	2–0–4
11	Guinea	0–0–5

== Awards ==
2012 African Men's Junior Handball Championship

Tunisia
3rd title

== See also ==
- 2012 African Men's Handball Championship
- 2012 African Men's Youth Handball Championship
