= 2013 FIBA Africa Women's Clubs Champions Cup squads =

This article displays the rosters for the participating teams at the 2013 FIBA Africa Club Championship for Women.

== (Morocco) Club Omnisport De Meknès ==
Club Omnisport De Meknès – 2013 FIBA Africa Women's Clubs Champions Cup – 6th place roster
Players							Coaches
Pos	#	Nat	Name	Height	Weight	Age	Head Coach
	4	(Morocco)	Bahia Bouayad				(Morocco) Bakass Driss
	5	(Morocco)	Fatim Ezzahra Tazi
	6	(Morocco)	Nawal Azzi				Assistant coach(es)
	7	(Morocco)	Ikram Tourabi				(Morocco) Ibo-Keïta
	8	(Morocco)	Hanane Bendaoud				(Morocco) Ben Abdelkhalek
	9	(Morocco)	Hind Bika
	10	(Morocco)	Hassana Oualilou
C	11	(Cameroon)	Hermine Guotué	1.93 m (6 ft 4 in)		11 July 1992 (aged 21)
	12	(Senegal) (Mali)	Ramata Daou
	13	(Morocco)	Hind Loumari
	14	(Morocco)	Rajae Sbihi
	15	(Morocco)	Meriem Hamzaoui

== (Nigeria) Dolphins ==
Dolphins – 2013 FIBA Africa Women's Clubs Champions Cup – 8th place roster
Players							Coaches
Pos	#	Nat	Name	Height	Weight	Age	Head Coach
	4	(Nigeria)	Tokunbo Olaosebikan (C)	1.60 m (5 ft 3 in)	46 kg (101 lb)	27 January 1991 (aged 22)	(Nigeria) Ochuko Okworogun
	5	(Nigeria)	Patience Okpe			28 August 1994 (aged 19)
	6	(Nigeria)	Mary Isuambuk			1 September 1994 (aged 19)	Assistant coach(es)
	7	(Nigeria)	Joan Afimia		60 kg (130 lb)
	8	(Nigeria)	Atinuke Arowosafe	1.80 m (5 ft 11 in)	65 kg (143 lb)	25 September 1990 (aged 23)
	9	(Nigeria)	Anurika Obimoro	1.75 m (5 ft 9 in)	75 kg (165 lb)
	10	(Nigeria)	Regina Iornumbe
	11	(Nigeria)	Rebecca Iritei			25 June 1986 (aged 27)
	12	(Nigeria)	Rashidat Sadiq	1.88 m (6 ft 2 in)	78 kg (172 lb)	3 January 1981 (aged 32)
	14	(Nigeria)	Bintu Bhadmus	1.80 m (5 ft 11 in)	75 kg (165 lb)	10 November 1985 (aged 28)
	15	(Togo)	Nadege Kodjo	1.96 m (6 ft 5 in)	76 kg (168 lb)

== (Kenya) Eagle Wings ==
Eagle Wings – 2013 FIBA Africa Women's Clubs Champions Cup – Bronze medal roster
Players							Coaches
Pos	#	Nat	Name	Height	Weight	Age	Head Coach
	4	(Kenya)	Everlyne Nora	1.83 m (6 ft 0 in)	75 kg (165 lb)	11 September 1983 (aged 30)	(Kenya) Thomas Olumbo
	5	(Kenya)	Linda Nyikuli	1.75 m (5 ft 9 in)	80 kg (180 lb)	20 July 1987 (aged 26)
	6	(Kenya)	Rebecca Sarange	1.68 m (5 ft 6 in)	76 kg (168 lb)	12 October 1982 (aged 31)	Assistant coach(es)
	7	(Kenya)	Samba Mjomba	1.70 m (5 ft 7 in)	67 kg (148 lb)	30 August 1985 (aged 28)	(Kenya) Evelyn Kedogo
	8	(Kenya)	AnneRose Atieno	1.75 m (5 ft 9 in)	75 kg (165 lb)	13 June 1990 (aged 23)
	9	(Kenya)	Rose Ouma	1.73 m (5 ft 8 in)	72 kg (159 lb)	6 November 1984 (aged 29)
	10	(Kenya)	Eleanor Musundi	1.88 m (6 ft 2 in)	68 kg (150 lb)
	11	(Kenya)	Silalei Shani	1.88 m (6 ft 2 in)	75 kg (165 lb)	14 December 1986 (aged 26) C
	13	(Kenya)	Janet Okoth	1.78 m (5 ft 10 in)	75 kg (165 lb)	18 June 1989 (aged 23)
	14	(Kenya)	Bridgit Nanzala	1.85 m (6 ft 1 in)	70 kg (150 lb)	6 January 1983 (aged 30)
	15	(Kenya)	Natalie Akinyi	1.65 m (5 ft 5 in)	68 kg (150 lb)	7 September 1993 (aged 20)

== (Nigeria) First Deepwater ==
First Deepwater – 2013 FIBA Africa Women's Clubs Champions Cup – 4th place roster
Players							Coaches
Pos	#	Nat	Name	Height	Weight	Age	Head Coach
	4	(Nigeria)	Adenike Aderinto			8 April 1993 (aged 20)	(Nigeria) Lateef Erinfolami
	5	(Nigeria)	Upe Atosu			21 April 1993 (aged 20)
	6	(Nigeria)	Elizabeth Chukwuma			8 November 1993 (aged 20)	Assistant coach(es)
	7	(Nigeria)	Mary Chinweokwu			10 October 1985 (aged 28)
	8	(Nigeria)	Nkechi Akashili			22 February 1990 (aged 23)
	10	(Nigeria)	Blessing Dabor			15 December 1993 (aged 19)
	11	(Nigeria)	Blessing Emmanuel
	12	(Nigeria)	Josette Anaswem			17 November 1992 (aged 21)
	13	(Nigeria)	Magdalene Ukato			12 February 1986 (aged 27)
	14	(Nigeria)	Keleshi Obasi			7 December 1988 (aged 24)
	15	(Nigeria)	Rasheeda Ahmed			17 November 1993 (aged 20)

== (Angola) Interclube ==
G.D. Interclube – 2013 FIBA Africa Women's Clubs Champions Cup – Gold medal roster
Players							Coaches
Pos	#	Nat	Name	Height	Weight	Age	Head Coach
PG	4	(Angola)	Catarina Camufal (C)	1.68 m (5 ft 6 in)	67 kg (148 lb)	30 March 1980 (aged 33)	(Angola) Apolinário Paquete
SF	5	(Angola)	Judite Queta	1.86 m (6 ft 1 in)		29 August 1985 (aged 28)
SG	6	(United States)	Italee Lucas	1.73 m (5 ft 8 in)		12 January 1989 (aged 24)	Assistant coach(es)
	7	(Angola)	Elizabeth Mateus			30 July 1993 (aged 20)	(Angola) Elisa Pires
PG	8	(Angola)	Indira José	1.72 m (5 ft 7 1/2 in)		1 March 1985 (aged 28)	(Angola) Fernando Sapalo
SF	9	(Angola)	Astrida Vicente	1.77 m (5 ft 9 1/2 in)	69 kg (152 lb)	6 October 1978 (aged 35)
	10	(Angola)	Merciana Fernandes			4 April 1992 (aged 21)
C	11	(Mali)	Meiya Tirera	1.87 m (6 ft 1 1/2 in)		15 April 1986 (aged 27)
PF	12	(Angola)	Nadir Manuel	1.85 m (6 ft 1 in)	79 kg (174 lb)	30 November 1986 (aged 26)
SF	13	(Angola)	Felizarda Jorge	1.80 m (5 ft 11 in)	78 kg (172 lb)	23 February 1985 (aged 28)
C	14	(Angola)	Angelina Golome	1.90 m (6 ft 3 in)		23 March 1988 (aged 25)
PF	15	(Angola)	Ngiendula Filipe	1.80 m (5 ft 11 in)	72 kg (159 lb)	20 May 1982 (aged 31)

== (Morocco) IR Tanger ==
IR Tanger – 2013 FIBA Africa Women's Clubs Champions Cup – 7th place roster
Players							Coaches
Pos	#	Nat	Name	Height	Weight	Age	Head Coach
	4	(Morocco)	P Hibatallah
	5	(Morocco)	L Amal
	6	(Morocco)	M Addji				Assistant coach(es)
	7	(Morocco)	P Houda
	8	(Morocco)	H Sanae
	9	(Morocco)	Z Zineb
	10	(Morocco)	D Lari
	11	(Morocco)	D Kawtar
	12	(Morocco)	E Fatima Zohra
	13	(Morocco)	E Houda
	14	(Morocco)	O Kawtar
	15	(Morocco)	H Ouafae

== (Angola) Primeiro de Agosto ==
Primeiro de Agosto – 2013 FIBA Africa Women's Clubs Champions Cup – Silver medal roster
Players							Coaches
Pos	#	Nat	Name	Height	Weight	Age	Head Coach
G	4	(Angola)	Fineza Eusébio	1.78 m (5 ft 10 in)	70 kg (150 lb)	18 July 1990 (aged 23)	(Angola) Aníbal Moreira
	5	(Portugal) (Angola)	Letícia André			11 December 1989 (aged 23)
G	6	(Angola)	Domitila Ventura	1.63 m (5 ft 4 in)		28 November 1978 (aged 35)	Assistant coach(es)
G	7	(Angola)	Rosa Gala	1.73 m (5 ft 8 in)	62 kg (137 lb)	17 April 1995 (aged 18)	(Angola) Jacqueline Francisco
PG	8	(Angola)	Isabel Francisco	1.66 m (5 ft 5 1/2 in)	65 kg (143 lb)	21 July 1980 (aged 33)
PF	9	(Mozambique)	Leia Dongue	1.85 m (6 ft 1 in)		24 May 1991 (aged 22)
F	10	(Angola)	Sónia Guadalupe	1.88 m (6 ft 2 in)	77 kg (170 lb)	15 September 1985 (aged 28)
C	11	(Angola)	Luísa Tomás	1.92 m (6 ft 3 1/2 in)	82 kg (181 lb)	24 March 1983 (aged 30)
SF	12	(Angola)	Ana Gonçalves	1.82 m (5 ft 11 1/2 in)	79 kg (174 lb)	3 January 1993 (aged 20)
PF	13	(Angola)	Nacissela Maurício	1.86 m (6 ft 1 in)	80 kg (180 lb)	2 June 1980 (aged 33)
F	14	(Angola)	Ernestina Neto	1.78 m (5 ft 10 in)		1 January 1979 (aged 34)
C	15	(Mozambique)	Deolinda Gimo	1.90 m (6 ft 3 in)		15 August 1987 (aged 26)

== (Kenya) USIU Flames ==
USIU Flames – 2013 FIBA Africa Women's Clubs Champions Cup – 5th place roster
Players							Coaches
Pos	#	Nat	Name	Height	Weight	Age	Head Coach
	4	(Kenya)	Catherine Ndung'u				(Kenya) George Mayienga
	5	(Kenya)	Doreen Nyagah	1.65 m (5 ft 5 in)	54 kg (119 lb)	25 September 1993 (aged 20)
	6	(Kenya)	Stephanie Muluka	1.70 m (5 ft 7 in)	62 kg (137 lb)	19 December 1993 (aged 19)	Assistant coach(es)
	7	(Kenya)	Emma Nyakweba	1.83 m (6 ft 0 in)	67 kg (148 lb)	16 April 1986 (aged 27)	(Kenya) Bonfas Salano
	8	(Kenya)	Hilda Indasi	1.68 m (5 ft 6 in)	58 kg (128 lb)	18 May 1985 (aged 28)
	9	(Kenya)	Zipporah Odhiambo	1.68 m (5 ft 6 in)	62 kg (137 lb)	22 October 1992 (aged 21)
	10	(Kenya)	Georgia Otieno	1.65 m (5 ft 5 in)	65 kg (143 lb)	12 June 1992 (aged 21)
	11	(Kenya)	Clarice Achieng	1.68 m (5 ft 6 in)	58 kg (128 lb)	10 January 1992 (aged 21)
	12	(Burundi)	Cynthia Irankunda	1.63 m (5 ft 4 in)	61 kg (134 lb)	19 September 1991 (aged 22)
	13	(Kenya)	Linda Mfuchi	1.83 m (6 ft 0 in)	58 kg (128 lb)	28 March 1989 (aged 24)
	14	(Kenya)	Ruphina Akinyi	1.68 m (5 ft 6 in)	85 kg (187 lb)	2 June 1993 (aged 20)
	15	(South Sudan)	Zeinab Chan	1.93 m (6 ft 4 in)		26 April 1986 (aged 27)

== See also ==
- 2013 FIBA Africa Championship squads
