= Yaya Cissokho =

Senegalese basketball player (born 1957)

Personal information
- Born: 24 January 1957 (age 69)
- Listed height: 6 ft 5 in (1.96 m)
- Listed weight: 192 lb (87 kg)

Career information
- NBA draft: 1979: undrafted
- Position: Power forward

Career history
- 1987–1988: Antibes
- 1989–1990: Caen
- 1990–1991: Cognac

Yaya Cissokho (born 24 January 1957) is a Senegalese former professional basketball player. Cissokho competed for Senegal at the 1980 Summer Olympics, where he scored 5 points in 6 games.

Cissokho played professionally in France for Antibes, Caen and Cognac.

His son, Sidy Cissoko, is a professional basketball player.
