= 2014 FIBA Africa Women's Clubs Champions Cup squads =

This article displays the rosters for the participating teams at the 2014 FIBA Africa Club Championship for Women.

== (Tunisia) Club Sportif Police de Circulation ==
Club Sportif Police de Circulation – 2014 FIBA Africa Women's Clubs Champions Cup – 7th place roster
Players							Coaches
Pos	#	Nat	Name	Height	Weight	Age	Head Coach
	4	(Tunisia)	Marwa El Abed			13 December 1988 (aged 25)	(Tunisia) Outail Aouij
	5	(Tunisia)	Dalila Latrous			12 August 1985 (aged 29)
	6	(Tunisia)	Imen Jrad			14 June 1990 (aged 24)	Assistant coach(es)
	7	(Tunisia)	Houda Hamrouni			7 February 1994 (aged 20)
	8	(Tunisia)	Rim Trabelsi			9 April 1987 (aged 27)
	9	(Tunisia)	Fatma Jebali			30 December 1989 (aged 24)
	10	(Tunisia)	Sonia Saadi			14 April 1989 (aged 25)
G	11	(Tunisia)	Nedra Dhouibi	1.72 m (5 ft 7 1/2 in)		3 September 1987 (aged 27)
C	12	(Democratic Republic of the Congo)	Betty Tshiniangu	1.84 m (6 ft 1/2 in)		5 January 1987 (aged 27)
F	13	(Tunisia)	Emna Jlida	1.75 m (5 ft 9 in)		25 March 1988 (aged 26)
F	14	(Tunisia)	Hajer Hafsi	1.77 m (5 ft 9 1/2 in)		29 January 1987 (aged 27)
	15	(Tunisia)	Maherzia Ksouri			2 October 1983 (aged 31)

== (Tunisia) Club Sportif Sfaxien ==
Club Sportif Sfaxien – 2014 FIBA Africa Women's Clubs Champions Cup – Bronze medal roster
Players							Coaches
Pos	#	Nat	Name	Height	Weight	Age	Head Coach
	4	(Tunisia)	Wafa Torkani			10 February 1988 (aged 26)	(Tunisia) Racem Marzougi
	5	(Tunisia)	Sawssen Jendoubi			22 August 1987 (aged 27)
	6	(Tunisia)	Yosra Taktouk			17 July 1995 (aged 19)	Assistant coach(es)
F	7	(Tunisia)	Fatma Zagrouba	1.77 m (5 ft 9 1/2 in)		21 February 1982 (aged 32)
	8	(Tunisia)	Hela Msadek			23 November 1989 (aged 25)
PF	9	(Tunisia)	Thouraya Adsi	1.83 m (6 ft 0 in)		4 May 1982 (aged 32)
	10	(Serbia)	Aleksandra Račić	1.81 m (5 ft 11 1/2 in)		19 September 1990 (aged 24)
G	11	(Tunisia)	Siwar Khlifa	1.66 m (5 ft 5 1/2 in)		11 January 1989 (aged 25)
	12	(Tunisia)	Khloud Mefteh			5 January 1991 (aged 23)
	13	(Tunisia)	Khouloud Akroute			17 February 1995 (aged 19)
PF	14	(Tunisia)	Hiba Kachouri	1.80 m (5 ft 11 in)		11 February 1991 (aged 23)
C	15	(United States)	Brittany Denson	1.91 m (6 ft 3 in)		10 June 1987 (aged 27)

== (Nigeria) Dolphins ==
Dolphins – 2014 FIBA Africa Women's Clubs Champions Cup – 5th place roster
Players							Coaches
Pos	#	Nat	Name	Height	Weight	Age	Head Coach
	4	(Nigeria)	Tokunbo Olaosebikan C	1.60 m (5 ft 3 in)	46 kg (101 lb)	27 January 1991 (aged 23)	(Nigeria) Wale Aboderin
	5	(Nigeria)	Ndidiamaka Nwakamma			30 June 1996 (aged 18)
	6	(Nigeria)	Patience Okpe			28 August 1994 (aged 20)	Assistant coach(es)
	7	(Nigeria)	Christiana Isaak			24 December 1994 (aged 19)	(Nigeria) Tunji Awojobi
G	8	(Nigeria)	Upe Atosu	1.60 m (5 ft 3 in)		21 April 1993 (aged 21)
	9	(Nigeria)	Juliet Currency			16 July 1996 (aged 18)
	11	(Nigeria)	Tinuke Arowosafe			25 September 1986 (aged 28)
	12	(Nigeria)	Bintu Bhadmus	1.80 m (5 ft 11 in)	75 kg (165 lb)	10 November 1985 (aged 29)
	13	(Nigeria)	Oshorenua Erameh			28 October 1988 (aged 26)
	14	(Togo)	Akpene Kodjo			2 December 1989 (aged 25)
	15	(Ivory Coast)	Minata Fofana			22 March 1986 (aged 28)

== (Nigeria) First Bank ==
First Bank – 2014 FIBA Africa Women's Clubs Champions Cup – 4th place roster
Players							Coaches
Pos	#	Nat	Name	Height	Weight	Age	Head Coach
G	4	(Nigeria) (United States)	Sarah Ogoke	1.73 m (5 ft 8 in)	46 kg (101 lb)	25 June 1990 (aged 24)	(Nigeria) Adewunmi Aderemi
	5	(Togo)	Amah Adjoussi			8 December 1984 (aged 29)
	6	(Nigeria)	Sarah Nwakamma			27 April 1997 (aged 17)	Assistant coach(es)
G	7	(Nigeria) (United States)	Joyce Ekworomadu	1.73 m (5 ft 8 in)		6 August 1986 (aged 28)
	8	(Nigeria)	Regina Iornumbe			18 November 1994 (aged 20)
	9	(Nigeria)	Catherine Nzekwe			14 August 1986 (aged 28)
	10	(Senegal)	Khadidiatou Diagne			9 September 1983 (aged 31)
	11	(Nigeria) (United States)	Ndidi Madu			17 March 1989 (aged 25)
	12	(Nigeria)	Nkem Akaraiwe			22 December 1996 (aged 17)
	13	(Nigeria)	Juliet Chinyere			1 November 1993 (aged 21)
C	14	(Nigeria)	Priscilla Udeaja	1.91 m (6 ft 3 in)		29 June 1984 (aged 30)
	15	(Nigeria)	Grace Okonkwo			20 October 1986 (aged 28)

== (Democratic Republic of the Congo) I.N.S.S. ==
I.N.S.S. – 2014 FIBA Africa Women's Clubs Champions Cup – 6th place roster
Players							Coaches
Pos	#	Nat	Name	Height	Weight	Age	Head Coach
	4	(Democratic Republic of the Congo)	Evodie Longa			20 May 1995 (aged 19)	(Democratic Republic of the Congo) Vale Mosengo
	5	(Democratic Republic of the Congo)	Musau Kalundu			30 November 1977 (aged 37)
	6	(Democratic Republic of the Congo)	Judith Okundji			17 June 1992 (aged 22)	Assistant coach(es)
	7	(Democratic Republic of the Congo)	Angel Awaka			24 July 1973 (aged 41)	(Democratic Republic of the Congo) Ntangu Samua
F	8	(Democratic Republic of the Congo)	Cecile Nyoka	1.77 m (5 ft 9 1/2 in)		18 September 1986 (aged 28)
	9	(Democratic Republic of the Congo)	Natacha Teba			28 May 1992 (aged 22)
	10	(Democratic Republic of the Congo)	Hortis Ahongi			10 October 1987 (aged 27)
C	11	(Democratic Republic of the Congo)	Mireille Tshiyoyo	1.84 m (6 ft 1/2 in)		25 November 1988 (aged 26)
G	12	(Democratic Republic of the Congo)	Flavie Ngono	1.69 m (5 ft 6 1/2 in)		4 July 1986 (aged 28)
	13	(Democratic Republic of the Congo)	Ngusu Mafuta			23 February 1989 (aged 25)
	14	(Democratic Republic of the Congo)	Mireille Nyota			2 February 1990 (aged 24)
	15	(Democratic Republic of the Congo)	Christine Mitschiabu (C)			24 July 1994 (aged 20)

== (Angola) Interclube ==
G.D. Interclube – 2014 FIBA Africa Women's Clubs Champions Cup – Gold medal roster
Players							Coaches
Pos	#	Nat	Name	Height	Weight	Age	Head Coach
PG	4	(Angola)	Luzia Simão			20 February 1992 (aged 22)	(Angola) Manuel Sousa
PG	5	(Angola)	Elsa Eduardo	1.70 m (5 ft 7 in)		23 July 1989 (aged 25)
SG	6	(United States)	Italee Lucas	1.73 m (5 ft 8 in)		12 January 1989 (aged 25)	Assistant coach(es)
G	7	(Angola)	Merciana Fernandes	1.69 m (5 ft 6 1/2 in)		2 April 1992 (aged 22)	(Angola) Fernando Sapalo
F	8	(Angola)	Rosemira Daniel	1.72 m (5 ft 7 1/2 in)		24 October 1993 (aged 21)
SF	9	(Angola)	Astrida Vicente	1.73 m (5 ft 8 in)	69 kg (152 lb)	6 October 1978 (aged 36)
F	10	(United States)	Sequoia Holmes	1.78 m (5 ft 10 in)	70 kg (150 lb)	13 June 1986 (aged 28)
PF	11	(Angola)	Ângela Cardoso	1.80 m (5 ft 11 in)		9 April 1979 (aged 35)
PF	12	(Angola)	Nadir Manuel	1.88 m (6 ft 2 in)	79 kg (174 lb)	30 November 1986 (aged 28)
SF	13	(Angola)	Felizarda Jorge	1.72 m (5 ft 7 1/2 in)	78 kg (172 lb)	23 February 1985 (aged 29)
C	14	(Angola)	Angelina Golome	1.92 m (6 ft 3 1/2 in)		23 March 1988 (aged 26)
PF	15	(Angola)	Ngiendula Filipe (C)	1.80 m (5 ft 11 in)	72 kg (159 lb)	20 May 1982 (aged 32)

== Kenya Ports Authority ==
Kenya Ports Authority – 2014 FIBA Africa Women's Clubs Champions Cup – 8th place roster
Players							Coaches
Pos	#	Nat	Name	Height	Weight	Age	Head Coach
	4	(Kenya)	Everlyne Odongo			11 September 1983 (aged 31)	(Kenya) Anthony Ojukwu
	5	(Kenya)	Helen Oketch			24 April 1992 (aged 22)
	6	(Kenya)	Caroline Mureji			8 October 1979 (aged 35)	Assistant coach(es)
	7	(Kenya)	Linet Obonyo			28 June 1991 (aged 23)	(Kenya) Samuel Wanjohi
	8	(Kenya)	Donnasama Achieng			12 September 1987 (aged 27)
	9	(Kenya)	Evelyne Nating'a			21 October 1984 (aged 30)
	10	(Kenya)	Irene Murambi			24 January 1978 (aged 36)
	12	(Kenya)	Yvonne Odhiambo			26 February 1988 (aged 26)
	13	(Kenya)	Volinet Wanyama			28 August 1984 (aged 30)
	14	(Kenya)	Gladys Alando			12 October 1984 (aged 30)
	15	(Kenya)	Irene Munyanya			17 May 1991 (aged 23)

== (Angola) Primeiro de Agosto ==
Primeiro de Agosto – 2014 FIBA Africa Women's Clubs Champions Cup – Silver medal roster
Players							Coaches
Pos	#	Nat	Name	Height	Weight	Age	Head Coach
G	4	(Angola)	Fineza Eusébio (C)	1.78 m (5 ft 10 in)	70 kg (150 lb)	18 July 1990 (aged 24)	(Angola) Jaime Covilhã
G	5	(Portugal) (Angola)	Letícia André	1.76 m (5 ft 9 1/2 in)		11 December 1989 (aged 24)
PF	6	(Mozambique)	Leia Dongue	1.85 m (6 ft 1 in)		24 May 1991 (aged 23)	Assistant coach(es)
G	7	(Angola)	Rosa Gala	1.73 m (5 ft 8 in)	62 kg (137 lb)	17 April 1995 (aged 19)	(Angola) Jaqueline Francisco
PG	8	(Angola)	Isabel Francisco	1.66 m (5 ft 5 1/2 in)	65 kg (143 lb)	21 July 1980 (aged 34)
F	9	(Angola)	Indira José	1.74 m (5 ft 8 1/2 in)		1 March 1985 (aged 29)
F	10	(Angola)	Sónia Guadalupe	1.88 m (6 ft 2 in)	77 kg (170 lb)	15 September 1985 (aged 29)
C	11	(Angola)	Luísa Tomás	1.92 m (6 ft 3 1/2 in)	82 kg (181 lb)	24 March 1983 (aged 31)
C	12	(Angola)	Helena Francisco	1.83 m (6 ft 0 in)		1 August 1993 (aged 21)
PF	13	(Angola)	Nacissela Maurício	1.86 m (6 ft 1 in)	80 kg (180 lb)	2 June 1980 (aged 34)
SF	14	(Angola)	Ana Gonçalves	1.82 m (5 ft 11 1/2 in)	79 kg (174 lb)	3 January 1993 (aged 21)
F	15	(United States)	Latia Williams	1.78 m (5 ft 10 in)		27 June 1990 (aged 24)

== (Kenya) USIU Flames ==
USIU Flames – 2014 FIBA Africa Women's Clubs Champions Cup – 9th place roster
Players							Coaches
Pos	#	Nat	Name	Height	Weight	Age	Head Coach
	4	(Kenya)	Clarice Odhiambo			10 August 1993 (aged 21)	(Kenya) George Mayienga
	5	(Kenya)	Doreen Nyagah	1.65 m (5 ft 5 in)	54 kg (119 lb)	25 September 1993 (aged 21)
	6	(Kenya)	Lisa Mayienga			17 May 1995 (aged 19)	Assistant coach(es)
	7	(Kenya)	Emma Nyakweba	1.83 m (6 ft 0 in)	67 kg (148 lb)	16 April 1986 (aged 28)
	8	(Kenya)	Hilda Indasi	1.68 m (5 ft 6 in)	58 kg (128 lb)	18 May 1985 (aged 29)
	9	(Kenya)	Zipporah Odhiambo	1.68 m (5 ft 6 in)	62 kg (137 lb)	22 October 1992 (aged 22)
	10	(Kenya)	Georgia Otieno	1.65 m (5 ft 5 in)	65 kg (143 lb)	12 June 1992 (aged 22)
	11	(Kenya)	Irene Atieno			28 December 1994 (aged 19)
	12	(Burundi)	Cynthia Irankunda	1.63 m (5 ft 4 in)	61 kg (134 lb)	19 September 1991 (aged 23)
	13	(Kenya)	Mitchelle Otinda			1 December 1982 (aged 32)
	14	(Kenya)	Ruphina Akinyi	1.68 m (5 ft 6 in)	85 kg (187 lb)	2 June 1993 (aged 21)
	15	(South Sudan)	Zeinab Chan	1.93 m (6 ft 4 in)		26 April 1986 (aged 28)

== See also ==
- 2013 FIBA Africa Championship squads
