= Oniangué =

Oniangué, also spelled Oniangue, is a surname. Notable people with the surname include:

- Giovan Oniangue (born 1991), Congolese basketball player
- Prince Oniangué (born 1988), French-born Congolese footballer
