= Jean-Victor Traoré =

Burkinabé basketball player

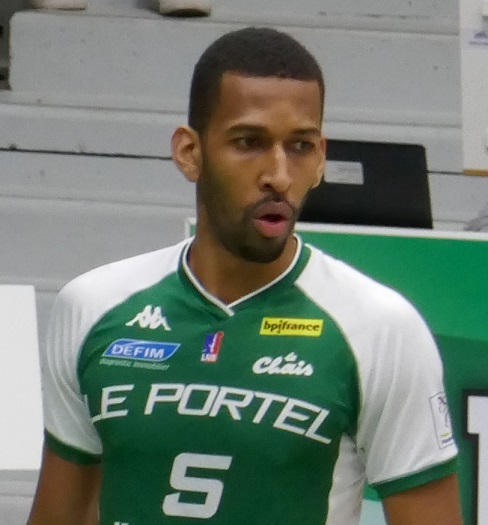
- Jean-Victor Traoré in 2018

No. 5 – Lille Métropole
- Position: Power forward
- League: LNB Pro B

Personal information
- Born: 20 June 1985 (age 41) Dakar, Senegal
- Listed height: 2.03 m (6 ft 8 in)

Career information
- Playing career: 2006–present

Career history
- 2009–2013: Étoile Angers Basket
- 2014–2017: Lille Métropole BC
- 2019–present: Lille Métropole BC

Sypir Jean-Victor Traoré (born 20 June 1985) is a Burkinabé professional basketball player for Lille Métropole BC of the LNB Pro B in France.

== Professional career ==
In June 2019, Traoré returned to Lille Métropole BC, where he played from 2014–2017. He re-signed with the team on June 30, 2021.

== National team ==
Traoré played for Burkina Faso’s national basketball team in 2012 and 2013.
