= Joris Bado =

Burkinabé professional basketball player

Basket Club Montbrison
- Position: Small forward / shooting guard
- League: NM2

Personal information
- Born: May 20, 1991 (age 35) Cognac, France
- Listed height: 6 ft 4 in (1.93 m)

Career information
- Playing career: 2011–present

Career history
- 2011–2013: Cognac BB
- 2014–2016: Etoile Sportive Prisse Macon
- 2016–present: Basket Club Montbrison

Joris Ambroise Bruno Bado (born May 20, 1991) is a Burkinabé professional basketball player. He currently plays for the Basket Club Montbrison Sports Club of the NM2 in France. Bado is one of Burkina Faso's most prominent basketball figures.

He played most minutes for the Burkina Faso national basketball team at the 2013 FIBA Africa Championship in Abidjan, Ivory Coast.
