= Lille Métropole BC =

French basketball club

LMBC
- Leagues: Pro B
- Founded: 1994; 31 years ago
- History: Lille Métropole Basket (1921–present)
- Arena: Palais des Sports Saint-Sauveur
- Capacity: 1,800
- Location: Lille, France
- President: Servais Tomavo
- Head coach: Jean-Marc Dupraz
- Team captain: Nicolas Taccoen
- Website: www.lmbc.fr

Lille Métropole Basket Clubs, often referred to as LMBC, is a French professional basketball club based in Lille. The club currently plays in the LNB Pro B, the second division of basketball in France.

== Players ==
=== Current roster ===
Note: Flags indicate national team eligibility at FIBA-sanctioned events. Players may hold other non-FIBA nationalities not displayed.

Lille Métropole Basket roster
Players
Coaches

Pos.	No.	Nat.	Name	Ht.	Wt.	Age
PG	2	(United States)	Golson, Vincent	1.73 m (5 ft 8 in)		31 – 1 February 1994
PF	11	(Grenada)	Phillip, Lien	2.03 m (6 ft 8 in)		35 – 25 October 1989
SF	12	(France)	Lasserre, Marc-Olivier	1.99 m (6 ft 6 in)		23 – 3 May 2002
SF	17	(France)	Thirouard-Samson, Lorenzo	1.97 m (6 ft 6 in)		24 – 19 February 2001
SG	18	(Spain)	Suka-Umu, Marcos	1.85 m (6 ft 1 in)		39 – 6 July 1985
G	20	(France)	Loubaki, Luc	1.91 m (6 ft 3 in)		28 – 20 January 1997
PG	22	(France)	Kherzane, Ismaïl	1.82 m (6 ft 0 in)		23 – 2 February 2002
PF	42	(France)	Ponsar, Carl	2.03 m (6 ft 8 in)		28 – 2 April 1997
SF		(Democratic Republic of the Congo)	Eyenga, Christian	1.98 m (6 ft 6 in)		36 – 22 May 1989

Head coach

- (France) Maxime Bézin

Assistant coach(es)

- (France) Josselyn Rallec

Legend

- (C) Team captain
- Injured

- Roster
Updated: November 12, 2023

== Season by season ==
Season	Tier	League	Pos.	French Cup	Other competitions		Playoffs
2011–12	2	Pro B	10th	First round			
2012–13	2	Pro B	11th	Round of 16			
2013–14	2	Pro B	16th	First round			
2014–15	2	Pro B	11th	First round			
2015–16	2	Pro B	9th	First round			
2016–17	2	Pro B	3rd	Round of 16	Pro B Leaders Cup	SF	First Round
2017-18	2	Pro B	5th	First round	Pro B Leaders Cup	First round	Semifinals
2018-19	2	Pro B	14th	Round of 32	Pro B Leaders Cup	First round	
2019-20	2	Pro B	6th	Cancelled	Pro B Leaders Cup	First round	
2020-21	2	Pro B	9th	Round of 32	Pro B Leaders Cup	First round	
2021-22	2	Pro B	16th	Round of 32	Pro B Leaders Cup	First round	

== Notable players ==
Note: Flags indicate national team eligibility at FIBA-sanctioned events. Players may hold other non-FIBA nationalities not displayed.

Criteria

To appear in this section a player must have either:

- Set a club record or won an individual award while at the club
- Played at least one official international match for their national team at any time
- Played at least one official NBA match at any time.

- (Burkina Faso) Jean-Victor Traore
- (United States) Jason Siggers
- (Cape Verde) Ivan Almeida
- (Finland) Ville Kaunisto
