= CEP Fleurus =

- Leagues: Belgian Third Division
- Founded: 1925; 100 years ago
- History: CEP Fleurus (1925–present)
- Arena: Salle de Bonsecours André Robert
- Location: Fleurus, Belgium
- Team colors: Black, yellow
- President: Laurent Dumont
- Head coach: Stephane Huegaerts
- Website: www.cepfleurus.be
| Home | Away |

Cercle d’Education Physique Fleurus, mostly referred to as CEP Fleurus or simply CEP, is a Belgian basketball club based in the city of Fleurus. The team plays in the Belgian Third Division.

== History ==
After the establishment of the team in 1925 (with the founders that were George Melotte, Auguste Servais, Edgard Malnoury, Jean Leclercq and Albert Marfort), CEPF joined the federation of Brabant in 1936 (with the opponents Royal IV, the Fresh Air, St. Gilloise Union, etc...). The registration number 069, launched at the baptismal font there 78 years, was to become the oldest of the Kingdom. After the War, the CEPF part in the first national championship was in 1947 to 1948 and after various tribulations and while the club plays at the provincial level, a former international took over, Jean Thiendpont. A sporty recovery took the team after the takeover of the Presidency by André Robert in 1965, which was to hold these 38 years until 2003. 1969 already achieved promotion to the second division Belgian and construction of the hall Bonsecours also enabled the development of the team, which advanced three years later in the highest national league.

The cobblestones of Place Albert I were no longer valid and CEPF could continue to grow and finally reach Division 1 three years later with the help of his first US reinforcements were Tom and Greg Newell Nelson. That was the beginning of the epic CEPF increasing its reputation on the Belgian and internationally, with participation in the FIBA Korać Cup in 1980, finishing third in the national championship in 1980 and 1982, the club's best ranking.

CEPF will switch first in D2 (1983) to find the elite two years later under the direction of Jiri Zednicek, a coach at the iron fist before a free fall in the hierarchy after two seasons experienced at Garenne Charleroi.Du journey of D1, we note prestigious names: Roger Moore (the other), Lloyd Batts, Rick Suttle, Stanislaz Kropilak Dean Marquardt, and the Belgian side Erik Rogiers, Jean-Marie Barbier and even a certain Jean -Marc JAUMIN who began his career D1 under the banner of the CEP Charleroi Garenne.

Beyond its borders, CEPF however lost its identity and the reconstruction will include his school young people will emigrate to the IND in 1991. But in 2003 was hit the seal of renewal because it is the year of the a committee which replaces Giovanni Mureddu for president André Robert (becomes honorary member) along with a new project focused around the merger of fleurusiens clubs (CEP + Bonsecours), CEPF (the new ASBL) as we now say, finding his favorite room. But that's not all because, in addition to the resumption of a serial P1 (1011 replaces the 069), the future project on management succession since fleurusienne school basketball was born, joining forces of Fleurus / Lambusart entity, a synergy created under the leadership of the City and the local basketball personalities but will have lasted the space of a season. For now, the CEP F stands on its own, and joined the National after his titles in Regional 1.

== Notable players ==
Note: Flags indicate national team eligibility at FIBA-sanctioned events. Players may hold other non-FIBA nationalities not displayed.

Criteria

To appear in this section a player must have either:

- Set a club record or won an individual award while at the club
- Played at least one official international match for their national team at any time
- Played at least one official NBA match at any time.

- (Belgium) Jean-Marc Jaumin
- (Burkina Faso) Moussa Ouattara
- (Czechoslovakia) Stanislav Kropilak
- (United States) Lloyd Batts
