= Samuel Ouedraogo =

Burkinabé basketball player (born 1987)

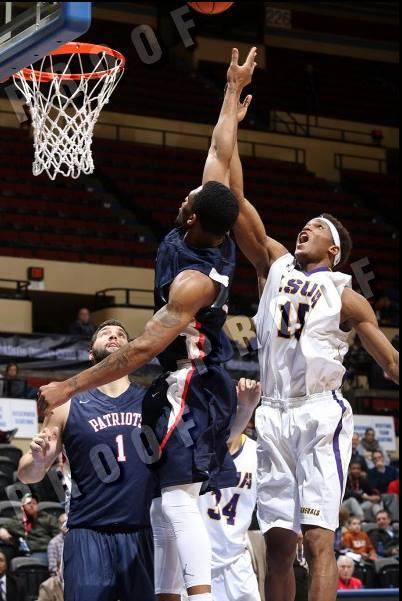
- Samuel Ouedraogo (15) at the NAIA Nationals battling a rebound for LSU- Alexandria (18 March 2015)

Personal information
- Born: 15 March 1987 (age 39) Ouagadougou, Burkina Faso
- Listed height: 6 ft 09 in (2.06 m)
- Listed weight: 225 lb (102 kg)

Career information
- College: LSU–Alexandria (2014–2015); Bluefield State College (2012–2014); Daemen College (2011–2012)
- NBA draft: 2015: undrafted
- Position: Power forward / center

Samuel Wendpagnangdé Ouedraogo (born 15 March 1987) is a Burkinabé former basketball player who plays both the power forward and center positions.

He is a two times defensive player of the year and once led the NCAA II in both rebounds per game and offensive rebounds per game. He also has an international experience playing in the FIBA Afrobasket.

== Biography ==
Ouedraogo is the oldest son from a family of nine children. Soon after his arrival in the United States in December 2009, he started getting a lot of attention from scouts, landing multiple scholarship offers. He is from Ouagadougou, the capital city of Burkina Faso.

== College career ==
Ouedraogo won two conference team titles in the NAIA. He also played in the NCAA for Bluefield State College in West Virginia, where he dominated the nation in total rebounds( 12.5 RPG) and offensive rebounds (5.2 RPG) over his junior year. Previously during his sophomore year, he got selected to play for the Burkina Faso national team at the FIBA Afrobasket

Ouedraogo participated at the NAIA national tournament with Daemen College from New York during his freshman year in 2012 and with Louisiana State University at Alexandria for his senior year in 2015.

On 21 January 2013, Ouedraogo beat an ASRC arena's 11 years old record in rebounds against West Liberty University, while playing at Bluefield State College. 11 of his 19 rebounds that night were offensive rebounds. He had a career high and school record of 25 rebounds (12 offensive rebounds) on 20 November 2013 against West Virginia State University

Ouedraogo graduated from college in 2015 at Louisiana State University at Alexandria

== Professional career ==
Ouedraogo went undrafted during the 2015 NBA draft.

In 2021, Ouedraogo was selected to be part of Ice Cube's BIG3 Basketball League. The draft class was filled with a lot of NBA alumni including the likes of Metta World Peace, Jordan Hill, Renaldo Balkman, Jason Maxiell, Mamadou N'diaye, Ryan Hollins, DeShawn Stevenson, Isaiah Austin etc. Ouedraogo went undrafted.

== International career ==
Ouedraogo is a member of the Burkina Faso National Basketball Team. He played in the FIBA afrobasket tournament in 2013 in Abidjan, Ivory Coast.
