= Moussa Ouattara (basketball) =

Burkinabé basketball player

Personal information
- Born: 5 April 1988 (age 38) Bobo-Dioulasso, Burkina Faso
- Listed height: 6 ft 8 in (2.03 m)

Career information
- Playing career: 2008–2017
- Position: Power forward / center

Career history
- 2012–2013: ASTE Kain
- 2015–2017: CEP Fleurus

Moussa Ouattara (born 5 April 1988) is a Burkinabé retired basketball player. He played in the Belgian Second Division with ASTE Kain and CEP Fleurus.

He represented Burkina Faso's national basketball team at the AfroBasket 2013 in Abidjan, Ivory Coast, where he led his team in points, rebounds, assists and steals.
