= Edgar Abreu =

Portuguese footballer

Personal information
- Full name: Luís Edgar Fernandes Abreu
- Date of birth: 16 February 1994 (age 32)
- Place of birth: Funchal, Portugal
- Height: 1.75 m (5 ft 9 in)
- Position: Midfielder

Team information
- Current team: Camacha

Youth career
- 2003–2007: Câmara Lobos
- 2007–2008: Porto
- 2008–2010: Câmara Lobos
- 2010–2013: Nacional

Senior career*
Years	Team	Apps	(Gls)
2013–2018	Nacional	15	(1)
2014	→ Mirandela (loan)	11	(0)
2016	→ União Leiria (loan)	7	(0)
2016–2017	→ Olhanense (loan)	30	(0)
2018–2019	Espinho	35	(4)
2019–2020	Académico Viseu	2	(0)
2020–2024	Lusitânia	80	(7)
2024–	Camacha	32	(0)
- * Club domestic league appearances and goals as of 20:07, 6 January 2026 (UTC)

Luís Edgar Fernandes Abreu (born 16 February 1994) is a Portuguese professional footballer who plays as a midfielder for Campeonato de Portugal club A.D. Camacha.

== Club career ==
Abreu was born in Funchal, Madeira. A product of local C.D. Nacional's youth academy, he made his senior debut with third division club SC Mirandela on loan.

Having returned to Nacional, Abreu first appeared in the Primeira Liga on 26 October 2014, coming on as a late substitute in the 1–0 home win against Académica de Coimbra. He scored his only goal in the competition on 9 November, but in a 1–2 loss to S.L. Benfica also at the Estádio da Madeira.

Abreu was also loaned in the following two seasons, to U.D. Leiria and S.C. Olhanense (the first team competed in the third tier, the second in the Segunda Liga).
