= Mehdi Cheriet =

French-Algerian basketball player

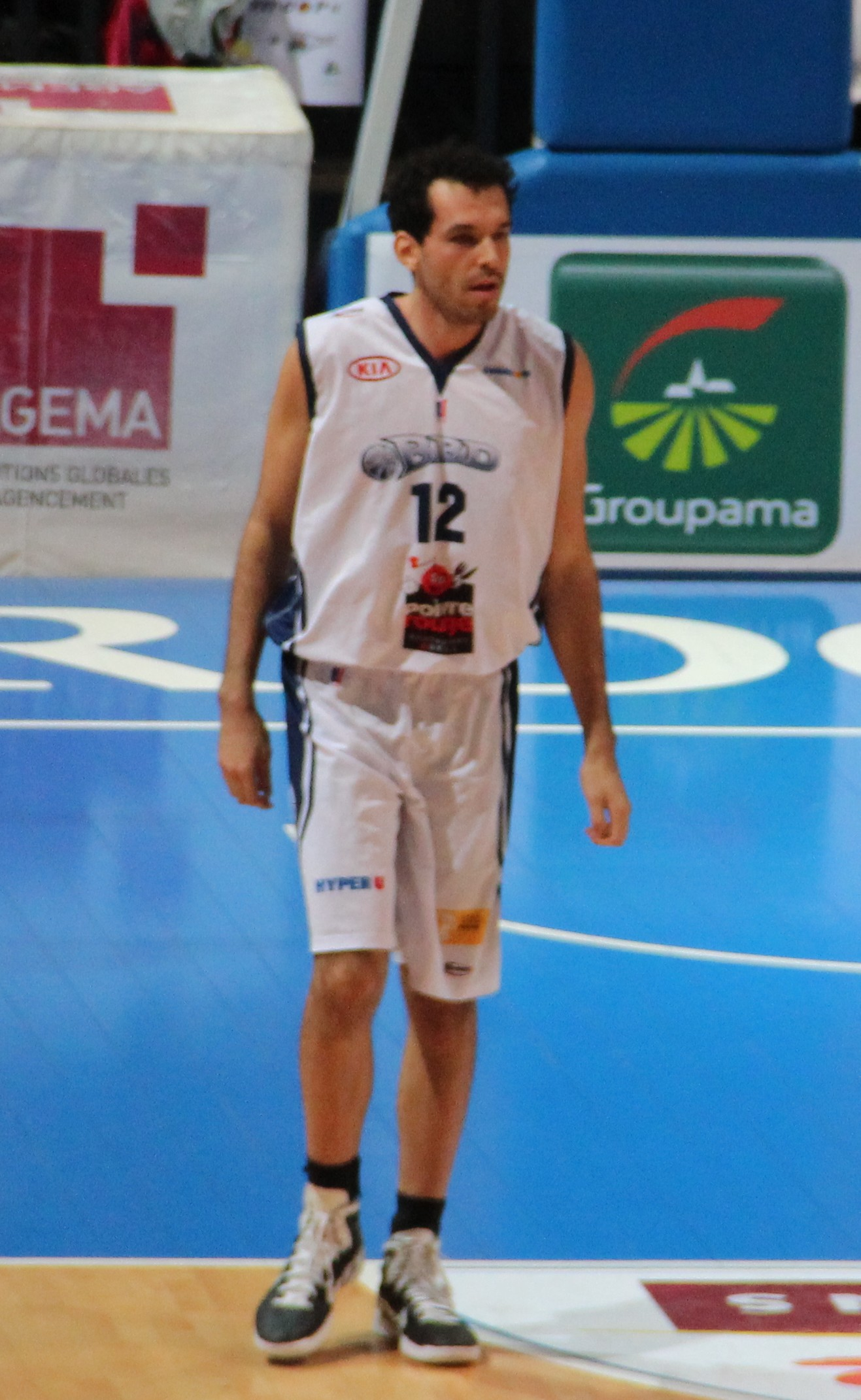
- Cheriet with Boulazac in 2012

Personal information
- Born: April 12, 1987 (age 39) Tarare, France
- Listed height: 6 ft 9 in (2.06 m)
- Listed weight: 220 lb (100 kg)

Career information
- High school: Albert Thomas (Roanne, France)
- College: Arizona Western (2006–2008); San Diego State (2008–2011)
- NBA draft: 2011: undrafted
- Playing career: 2011–2019
- Position: Power forward

Career history
- 2011–2013: Boulazac Dordogne
- 2013–2014: SOMB
- 2014–2015: ESSM Le Portel
- 2015–2017: Chorale Roanne
- 2017-2019: SO Maritime Boulogne

Career highlights
- First-team All-ACCAC (2008)

Mehdi Cheriet (born April 12, 1987) is a French-Algerian former professional basketball player.

== Collegiate career ==
After completing his years at Albert Thomas School in Roanne, France, Cheriet enrolled in Arizona Western College in Yuma, Arizona. He helped the team win their third consecutive JUCO Region I championship and the NJCAA district finals in his freshman season. As a sophomore, Cheriet was known as a premier NJCAA basketball player and was ranked the 17th-best junior college player by Rivals.com. By the end of the season, he garnered All-Arizona Community College Athletic Conference (ACCAC) honors as his team finished with a 26–3 record.

== International career ==
On July 20, 2015, it was announced that Cheriet would join Algeria for the AfroBasket 2015. He was called up by team head coach Ali Filali despite not being in the preliminary squad.
