= Gaston Essengué =

Cameroonian basketball player

Personal information
- Born: October 10, 1983 (age 43) Yaoundé, Cameroon
- Listed height: 6 ft 8 in (2.03 m)
- Listed weight: 240 lb (109 kg)

Career information
- College: Compton College (2003–2004); Weatherford College (2004–2005); UNLV (2005–2007)
- NBA draft: 2007: undrafted
- Position: Head coach
- Coaching career: 2025–present

Career history

Playing
- 2007–2008: Selçuk Üniversitesi BK
- 2008–2009: West-Brabant Giants
- 2009–2010: Étendard de Brest
- 2010: Sigal Prishtina
- 2010: Étendard de Brest
- 2010: Cosehisa Monzón
- 2010: Ciclista Juninense
- 2010–2011: Club San Martín de Corrientes
- 2011: Perak Farmcochen
- 2011–2012: Asociación Italiana
- 2012–2013: Quilmes de Mar del Plata
- 2013–2014: San Isidro San Francisco
- 2014: Libertad de Sunchales
- 2014–2015: Club Alianza Viedma
- 2015–2016: San Isidro San Francisco
- 2016–2017: Comunicaciones Mercedes
- 2018: Estudiantes de Olavarría
- 2018: Municipal Puente Alto
- 2018: Quilmes de Mar del Plata
- 2019: Platense
- 2019: Sol de América
- 2019–2020: Oberá
- 2021: Ameghino
- 2022: Faraones de NCG
- 2022: Venados de Mazatlán
- 2022: Buras de Hermosillo

Coaching
- 2025: Venados de Mazatlán
Medals
Men's basketball
Representing Cameroon
African Championships
Silver medal – second place	2007 Angola	Cameroon

Gaston Essengué (born October 10, 1983) is a Cameroonian basketball power forward with Club Atletico Quilmes in the Argentina National League. He is also a member of the Cameroon national team. Essengué first attended Compton College and Weatherford College in Texas, where he graduated from in 2005. He then transferred to UNLV, from where he graduated in 2007.

Essengué joined Venados de Mazatlán of the CIBACOPA in mid-2022. He signed with the Buras de Hermosillo of the Circuito de Baloncesto del Pacífico (CIBAPAC) later that year.

== National team career ==
Essengué won a silver medal with the Cameroon national team at AfroBasket 2007. Following AfroBasket 2015, where Cameroon finished in ninth place, he retired from the national team.
