= Issife Soumahoro =

French-born Ivorian basketball player

Brissac-Aubance
- Position: Small forward

Personal information
- Born: October 31, 1988 (age 38) Paris, France
- Listed height: 6 ft 5 in (1.96 m)

Career information
- Playing career: 2005–present

Career history
- 2005–2006: Levallois Sporting Club
- 2006–2010: SIG Strasbourg
- 2010–2012: Boulazac Dordogne
- 2012–2013: Fos Ouest Provence
- 2013–2015: Bordeaux
- 2015–2016: Rueil Athletic Club
- 2016–present: Brissac-Aubance

Issife Soumahoro (born October 31, 1988, in Paris) is a French-born Ivorian basketball player. He is also a member of the Côte d'Ivoire national basketball team.

Soumahoro joined Strasbourg IG as an 18-year-old for the 2007-08 season. In his first season of action, Soumahoro saw action in three games off the bench for the team. In the 2009-10 season, Soumahoro played in six games for the team and also appeared in two games for the team at the EuroChallenge 2009–10, the third-tier international basketball competition for European teams.

Soumahoro competed as a member of the Côte d'Ivoire national basketball team for the first time at the 2009 FIBA Africa Championship. He saw action in four games off the bench for the Ivorians, who won the silver medal to qualify for the 2010 FIBA World Championship.
