= Hervé Lamizana =

Ivorian professional basketball player (born 1981)

Personal information
- Born: January 22, 1981 (age 45) Abidjan, Ivory Coast
- Listed height: 6 ft 10 in (2.08 m)
- Listed weight: 220 lb (100 kg)

Career information
- High school: St. Patrick (Elizabeth, New Jersey)
- College: Rutgers (2001–2004)
- NBA draft: 2004: undrafted
- Playing career: 2004–2018
- Position: Power forward / center

Career history
- 2004: Türk Telekom
- 2005: Hapoel Galil Elyon
- 2005: Anyang KT&G Kites
- 2006: Hapoel Tel Aviv
- 2006–2008: Shandong Lions
- 2008–2009: Al Wasl
- 2009: Dongguan Park Lane
- 2009–2011: Tianjin Ronggang
- 2011: Indios de Mayagüez
- 2011: Hamamatsu Higashimikawa Phoenix
- 2012: Tianjin Ronggang
- 2012: Vaqueros de Bayamón
- 2013: Yulon Dinos
- 2013: Al Ahli
- 2013: Wuhan Dangdai
- 2013: Sichuan Blue Whales
- 2014: Air21 Express
- 2014: Soles de Santo Domingo Este
- 2014: Halcones UV Xalapa
- 2015: Yulon Dinos
- 2015: Trotamundos de Carabobo
- 2015: Reales de La Vega
- 2016: Al Mouttahed Tripoli
- 2016–2017: Yulon Dinos
- 2018: Taiwan Beer

Career highlights
- FIBA World Cup blocks leader (2010); 4x CBA blocks leader (2007, 2008, 2010, 2011); Third-team Parade All-American (2000)

Hervé Mamadou Lamizana (born January 22, 1981) is an Ivorian former professional basketball player who also has French nationality.

== College career ==
Lamizana played for the St. Patrick's basketball team in high school in Elizabeth, New Jersey, for Rutgers University in college. He was not selected in the NBA draft. In the 2003–04 season at Rutgers he achieved 102 blocks and pulled down 252 rebounds.

== Professional career ==
His first professional team was in Turkey with Türk Telekom Ankara, with whom he played in 2004. Later that season, he moved to Israel and played for Hapoel Galil Elyon.

He played in Israel in the next season with Hapoel Tel Aviv, after starting the season for the Anyang KT&G Kites in South Korea.

In 2006, he moved to China and played for the Shandong Lions.

In 2011 and 2012, he played in Puerto Rico with teams Indios de Mayagüez and Vaqueros de Bayamón.

During 2013, Herve played for the Yulon Luxgen Dinos of the Super Basketball League, the professional basketball league in Taiwan. He was named MVP in the month of January, 2013 after averaging 20.7 points, 12.2 rebounds, 3.2 blocks, and leading his team to a 4-2 record.

In September 2014, he signed with Halcones UV Xalapa of Mexico. The next month, he left Halcones after appearing in only five league games. In February 2015, he re-signed with Yulon Dinos of Taiwan. In April 2015, he signed with Trotamundos de Carabobo of Venezuela for the rest of the 2015 LPB season. In June 2015, he signed with Reales de La Vega of Dominican Republic. In March 2016 he signed with Al Mouttahed Tripoli of Lebanon, later played for Yulon Luxgen Dinos in Taiwan.
