= Mohamed Diop =

Senegalese basketball player

UGB
- Position: Forward
- League: Senegalese Division I Basketball League

Personal information
- Born: May 14, 1981 (age 45)
- Listed height: 6 ft 6 in (1.98 m)

Mohamed Diop (born May 14, 1981) is a Senegalese basketball player for UGB and the Senegalese national team, where he participated at the 2014 FIBA Basketball World Cup.
