= Cognac Basket Ball =

- Leagues: NM2
- Founded: 1988
- Location: Cognac, France
- Website: cognac-charente-basket.com

Cognac Basket Ball is a French professional basketball team located in Cognac, France. The team currently competes in the NM2.

The club is internationally known because some of its players have represented their African national teams at the FIBA Africa Championship.

== Notable players ==
To appear in this section a player must have either:

- Set a club record or won an individual award as a professional player.
- Played at least one official international match for his senior national team or one NBA game at any time.
- (Burkina Faso) Joris Bado
- (Republic of the Congo) Ulysse Dinga
- (United States) Hugh Robertson
