= Palais des Sports de Treichville =

Indoor sporting arena located in Treichville, Abidjan, Ivory Coas

Coordinates: 05°17′53″N 04°00′19″W

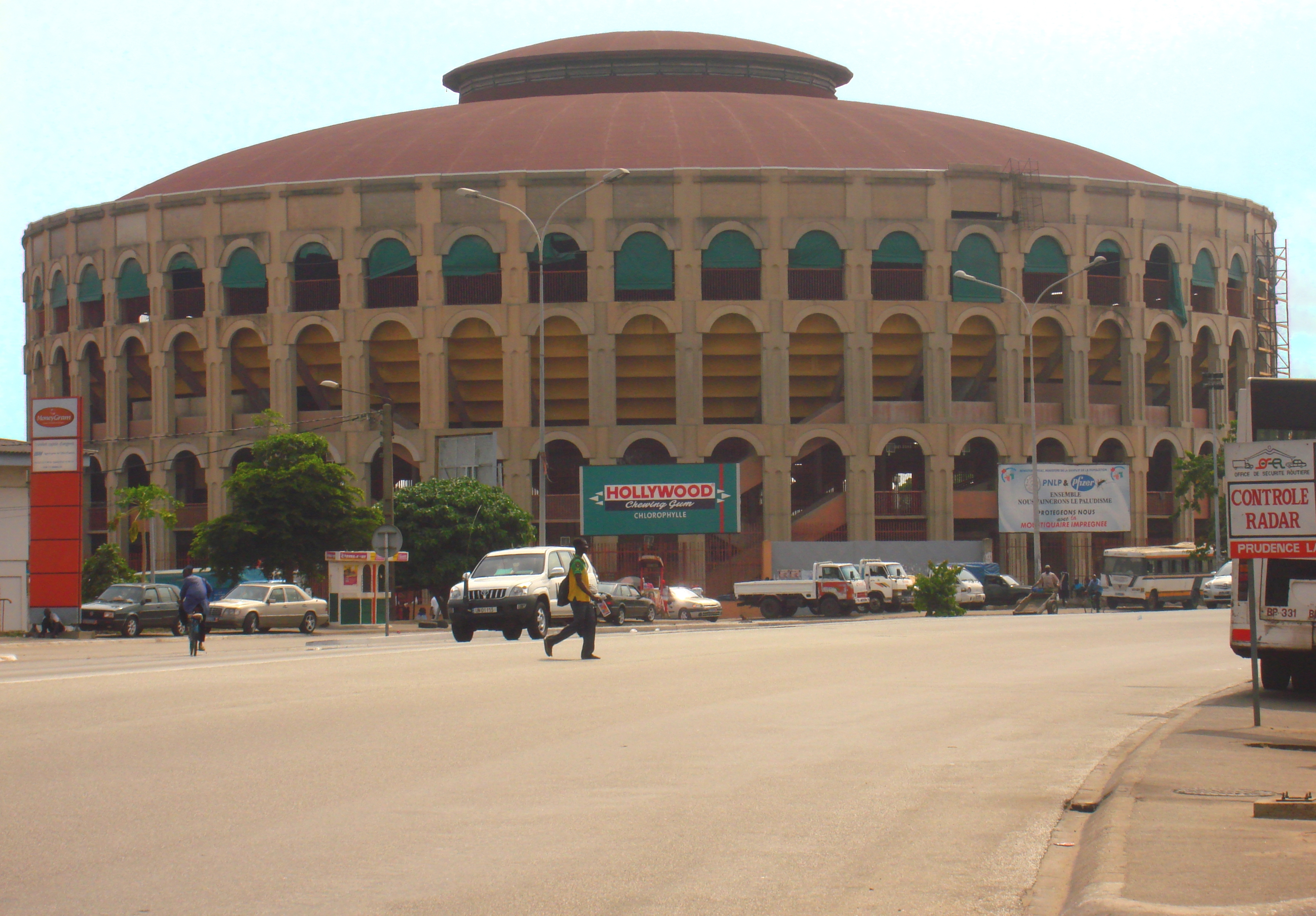
Palais des Sports de Treichville in 2008.

Palais des Sports de Treichville is an indoor sporting arena located in Treichville, Abidjan, Ivory Coast. The capacity of the arena is 3,500 people.
