= Giovan Oniangue =

Congolese basketball player (born 1991)

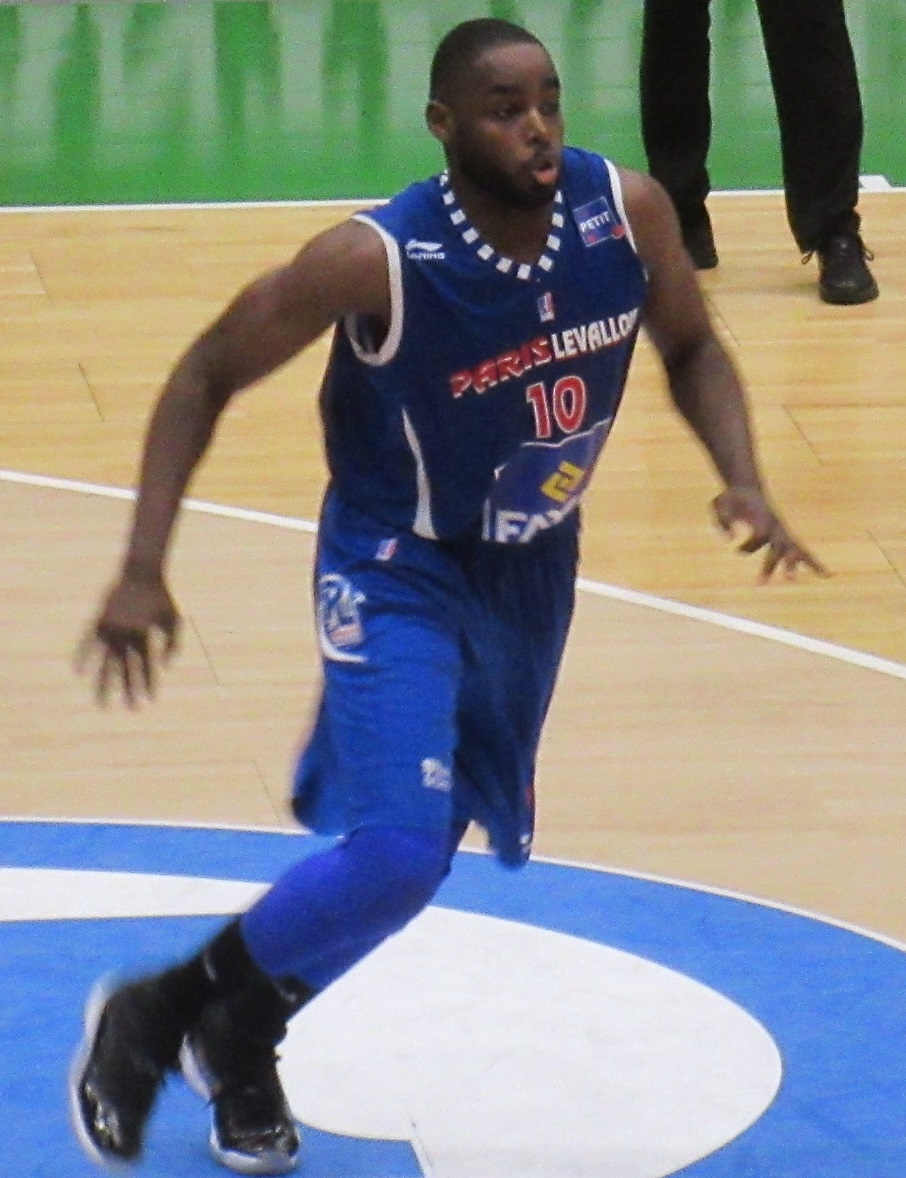
- Oniangue with Paris-Levallois

No. 10 – Metropolitans 92
- Position: Small forward
- League: Élite 2

Personal information
- Born: April 22, 1991 (age 35) Brazzaville, People's Republic of the Congo
- Listed height: 1.98 m (6 ft 6 in)

Career information
- NBA draft: 2013: undrafted
- Playing career: 2009–present

Career history
- 2009–2017: Paris-Levallois
- 2017–2019: Boulazac Basket Dordogne
- 2019–2021: Orléans Loiret Basket
- 2021–2023: Élan Béarnais
- 2023–2024: JDA Dijon
- 2024–2026: Saint-Quentin
- 2026–present: Metropolitans 92

Career highlights
- 2x French Cup champion (2013, 2022)

Giovan Oniangue (born April 22, 1991) is a Congolese professional basketball player for Metropolitans 92 of the French Élite 2. He plays mainly at the small forward position.

== Professional career ==
He signed with Orleans in January 2019, and averaged 7.8 points and 3.1 rebounds per game during the 2019-20 season. On May 29, 2020, he signed a two-year extension.

On August 23, 2021, he has signed with Élan Béarnais of the French Pro A.

On October 23, 2023, he signed with JDA Dijon Basket of the LNB Pro A.

On June 17, 2024, he signed with Saint-Quentin of the LNB Pro A.

== International career ==
He represented the Republic of the Congo's national basketball team at the AfroBasket 2013 in Abidjan, Ivory Coast, where he was his team’s top scorer.
