= 2023 FIBA AfroCan qualification =

The 2023 FIBA AfroCan qualification are the qualifying games for the 2023 FIBA AfroCan, the second edition of the AfroCan. The qualifiers started in February and will finish in June 2023. Four teams are pre-qualified, while eight teams can qualify through the tournament.

The qualification is divided into the FIBA Africa's designated geographical zones.

== Qualified teams ==
Team	Method of qualification	Date of qualification	Total times qualified	Last time qualified	Current consecutive appearances	Previous best performance
DR Congo	Top four teams of 2019 FIBA AfroCan	–	2	2019	2	Champions (2019)
Kenya	Top four teams of 2019 FIBA AfroCan	–	2	2019	2	Runners-up (2019)
Angola	Top four teams of 2019 FIBA AfroCan	–	2	2019	2	Third Place (2019)
Morocco	Top four teams of 2019 FIBA AfroCan	–	2	2019	2	Fourth Place (2019)
Mozambique	Winner of Zone 6	28 February 2023	1	–	–	–
Cameroon	Winner of Zone 4	26 March	1	–	–	–

== Games ==
=== Zone 6 ===
The games of Zone 6 of the AfroCan qualification began on 21 February 2023 and were hosted in Bulawayo, Zimbabwe. Malawi and South Africa were supposed to compete as well but both teams withdrew.

One ticket to the AfroCan is available for Zone 6.

==== Group phase ====
Pos	Team	Pld	W	L	PF	PA	PD	Pts	Qualification
1	Mozambique	4	2	2	282	250	+32	6 (Note: Difference: 1) Mozambique +31; 2) Zimbabwe +9; 3) Zambia –41.)	Final
2	Zimbabwe (H)	4	2	2	248	239	+9	6	Final
3	Zambia	4	2	2	242	238	+4	6	

Source: FIBA
Rules for classification: 1) Points; 2) Head-to-head points; 3) Head-to-head point difference; 4) Head-to-head points scored; 5) Point difference.
(H) Hosts
Notes:

21 February 2023	Zimbabwe	71–57	Mozambique	Bulawayo
				Arena: ZITF Hall 3

22 February 2023	Mozambique	86–46	Zambia	Bulawayo
				Arena: ZITF Hall 3

23 February 2023	Zambia	63–53	Zimbabwe	Bulawayo
				Arena: ZITF Hall 3

24 February 2023	Zimbabwe	71–53	Zambia	Bulawayo
				Arena: ZITF Hall 3

25 February 2023	Zambia	80–73(OT)	Mozambique	Bulawayo
				Arena: ZITF Hall 3

26 February 2023	Mozambique	66–53	Zimbabwe	Bulawayo
				Arena: ZITF Hall 3

=== Final ===
28 February 2023	Mozambique	71–59	Zimbabwe	Bulawayo
	Scoring by quarter: 26–19, 17–9, 13–18, 15–13
	Pts: Houana 18; Rebs: Houana, Manjate 7 Asts: Matos 3	Boxscore	Pts: Tswatswa 13; Rebs: Penduka 9 Asts: Chikoko 4	Arena: ZITF Hall 3

=== Zone 4 ===
Pos	Team	Pld	W	L	PF	PA	PD	Pts	Qualification
1	Cameroon (H)	4	4	0	331	232	+99	8	Qualified to FIBA AfroCan 2023
2	Gabon	4	3	1	302	225	+77	7	Qualified to FIBA AfroCan 2023
3	Central African Republic	4	2	2	287	250	+37	6	
4	Chad	4	1	3	272	261	+11	5	
5	Equatorial Guinea	4	0	4	183	407	−224	4	

Source: FIBA
Rules for classification: 1) Points; 2) Head-to-head points; 3) Head-to-head point difference; 4) Head-to-head points scored; 5) Point difference.
(H) Hosts

20 March 2023	Central African Republic	49–67	Cameroon	Yaoundé
				Arena: Yaoundé Multipurpose Sports Complex

21 March 2023	Gabon	71–80	Cameroon	Yaoundé
				Arena: Yaoundé Multipurpose Sports Complex

22 March 2023	Equatorial Guinea	52–113	Central African Republic	Yaoundé
				Arena: Yaoundé Multipurpose Sports Complex

22 March 2023	Gabon	54–52	Chad	Yaoundé
				Arena: Yaoundé Multipurpose Sports Complex

23 March 2023	Central African Republic	57–67	Gabon	Yaoundé
15:30
				Arena: Yaoundé Multipurpose Sports Complex

23 March 2023	Chad	82–57	Equatorial Guinea	Yaoundé
18:00
				Arena: Yaoundé Multipurpose Sports Complex

24 March 2023	Equatorial Guinea	36–110	Gabon	Yaoundé
15:30
				Arena: Yaoundé Multipurpose Sports Complex

24 March 2023	Chad	74–82	Cameroon	Yaoundé
18:00
				Arena: Yaoundé Multipurpose Sports Complex

25 March 2023	Central African Republic	68–64	Chad	Yaoundé
15:30
				Arena: Yaoundé Multipurpose Sports Complex

25 March 2023	Cameroon	102–38	Equatorial Guinea	Yaoundé
18:00
				Arena: Yaoundé Multipurpose Sports Complex

=== Zone 5 ===
The Zone 5 qualifiers were held from 17 June to 23 June in Dar es Salaam, the capital of Tanzania.

Pos	Team	Pld	W	L	PF	PA	PD	Pts	Qualification
1	Rwanda	0	0	0	0	0	0	0	Qualified to FIBA AfroCan 2023
2	Burundi	0	0	0	0	0	0	0	
3	Tanzania (H)	0	0	0	0	0	0	0	
4	Eritrea	0	0	0	0	0	0	0	
5	South Sudan	0	0	0	0	0	0	0	

Source: FIBA
Rules for classification: 1) Points; 2) Head-to-head points; 3) Head-to-head point difference; 4) Head-to-head points scored; 5) Point difference.
(H) Hosts
