= FIBA Basketball World Cup qualification =

International basketball qualifying process

The FIBA Basketball World Cup qualification is the process that a national basketball team goes through to qualify for the FIBA Basketball World Cup finals. Qualifiers are held within four FIBA continental zones Africa, Americas, Europe, and Asia-Oceania play in a combined Asia-Pacific region to qualify for the FIBA Basketball World Cup, which are organized by their respective confederations. One extra berth is allocated for the specific continental zone that hosts the event, in addition to the set berths allotted for the region.

The hosts of the World Cup receive an automatic berth. Unlike in previous editions results from the prior Summer Olympics and continental championships are not taken into account. Until 2014, the winners of the Summer Olympics and continental championships also received an automatic berth, but starting from the 2019 World Cup this is no longer the case.

== History ==
=== Summary ===
"+W" are invited teams (wild cards), "+O" are for teams that qualified via the Summer Olympics, "+C" are the defending world champions, and "+H" are for hosts.

Continental allocation
Zone		1950 (Argentina) (10)	1954 (Brazil) (12)	1959 (Chile) (13)	1963 (Brazil) (13)	1967 (Uruguay) (13)	1970 (Socialist Federal Republic of Yugoslavia) (13)	1974 (Puerto Rico) (14)	1978 (Philippines) (14)	1982 (Colombia) (13)	1986 (Spain) (24)	1990 (Argentina) (16)	1994 (Canada) (16)	1998 (Greece) (16)	2002 (United States) (16)	2006 (Japan) (24)	2010 (Turkey) (24)	2014 (Spain) (24)	2019 (China) (32)	2023 (Philippines) (Japan) (Indonesia) (32)	2027 (Qatar) (32)
North America	Americas	2O	W +O	W +O	W +O	O	O+W	2W	2W	2W	2W	5 +H	4 +O+H	4 +O	5 +H	4+W +O	4 +O	4+W +O	7	7	7
Central America & Caribbean	Americas	0	0	2W	2W	2	2	2 +H				5 +H	4 +O+H	4 +O	5 +H	4+W +O	4 +O	4+W +O	7	7	7
South America	Americas	3 +H	4 +H	2+W +H	3 +H	4 +H	2	2	1	1 +H+O		5 +H	4 +O+H	4 +O	5 +H	4+W +O	4 +O	4+W +O	7	7	7
Oceania					0	0	W	1	1	1	1+W	1	1	1	1	2	2	2	7 +H	6 +2H	7 +H
Asia		0	2W	3W	W	1	1	1	2 +H	1	3	2	2	2	2	3 +H	3+W	3	7 +H	6 +2H	7 +H
Africa		3 +O	3	3W	0	0	1	1	1	1	2	2	2	2	2	3	3	3	5	5	5
Europe		3 +O	3	2	3+1	4	2+W +H	3 +C	3 +C	1 +2O+C	6+W +H+C	5	5	5 +H	5	6+3W	6+3W +H	6+3W +H	12	12	12

==== Graphical ====
- Africa
- Americas
- Asia
- Europe
- Oceania
- H; host

Tournament	H	2	3	4	5	6	7	8	9	10	11	12	13	14	15	16	17	18	19	20	21	22	23	24	25	26	27	28	29	30	31	32
(Argentina) 1950		5					4																									
(Brazil) 1954		6						2		3																						
(Chile) 1959		7							3			2																				
(Brazil) 1963		7							1	4																						
(Uruguay) 1967		7							1	4																						
(Socialist Federal Republic of Yugoslavia) 1970		1	6						1	3			1																			
(Puerto Rico) 1974		1	6						1	4				1																		
(Philippines) 1978		1	5					2		4				1																		
(Colombia) 1982		1	5					1	4				1																			
(Spain) 1986		2		8								3			8								2									
(Argentina) 1990		2		5					2		5					1																
(Canada) 1994		2		5					2		5					1																
(Greece) 1998		2		5					2		5					1																
(United States) 2002		2		5					2		5					1																
(Japan) 2006		3			6						3			9									2									
(Turkey) 2010		3			5					4				9									2									
(Spain) 2014		3			6						3			9									2									
(China) 2019		5					7							7							12											
(Philippines) (Japan) (Indonesia) 2023			5					7							6						12											
(Qatar) 2027		5					7							7							12											

=== Qualification competition used ===
Competition	1950 (Argentina) (10)	1954 (Brazil) (12)	1959 (Chile) (13)	1963 (Brazil) (13)	1967 (Uruguay) (13)	1970 (Socialist Federal Republic of Yugoslavia) (13)	1974 (Puerto Rico) (14)	1978 (Philippines) (14)	1982 (Colombia) (13)	1986 (Spain) (24)	1990 (Argentina) (16)	1994 (Canada) (16)	1998 (Greece) (16)	2002 (United States) (16)	2006 (Japan) (24)	2010 (Turkey) (24)	2014 (Spain) (24)	2019 (China) (32)	2023 (Philippines) (Japan) (Indonesia) (32)	2027 (Qatar) (32)
Summer Olympics	Yes	Yes	Yes	Yes	Yes	Yes	No	No	Yes	No	No	Yes	Yes	Yes	Yes	Yes	Yes	No	No	No
FIBA Basketball World Cup	—	No	No	No	No	No	Yes	Yes	Yes	Yes	No	No	No	No	No	No	No	No	No	No
Centrobasket	—	—	—	—	Yes	Yes	Yes	Yes	Yes	Yes	No	No	No	No	No	No	No	No	No	No
AfroBasket	—	—	—	No	No	Yes	Yes	Yes	Yes	Yes	Yes	Yes	Yes	Yes	Yes	Yes	Yes	No	No	No
FIBA AmeriCup	—	—	—	—	—	—	—	—	No	No	Yes	Yes	Yes	Yes	Yes	Yes	Yes	No	No	No
FIBA Asia Cup	—	—	—	No	Yes	Yes	Yes	Yes	Yes	Yes	Yes	Yes	Yes	Yes	Yes	Yes	Yes	No	No	No
EuroBasket	Yes	Yes	Yes	Yes	Yes	Yes	Yes	Yes	Yes	Yes	Yes	Yes	Yes	Yes	Yes	Yes	Yes	No	No	No
FIBA Oceania Championship	—	—	—	—	—	—	Yes	Yes	Yes	Yes	Yes	Yes	Yes	Yes	Yes	Yes	Yes	No	No	No
South American Basketball Championship	Yes	Yes	Yes	Yes	Yes	Yes	Yes	Yes	Yes	Yes	No	No	No	No	No	No	No	No	No	No

=== Olympic, European and South American automatic berths ===
Before the creation of the first FIBA zones, qualifying for the FIBA World Championship, the original name of the FIBA Basketball World Cup, was via the Summer Olympics, regional championships and by invitation, although some teams were not able to compete due to political reasons. Teams from North and Central America, which did not have a regional championship until the establishment of the Centrobasket in 1965, Asia until the establishment of the Asian Championship in 1960, and Africa until the foundation of the African Championship in 1962, could either qualify via the Olympics or by invitation. The Olympics used the Pan American Games as a qualifying tournament, serving as the first qualifying tournament for North and Central American teams.

In the 1950 FIBA World Championship in Argentina, the top three teams from the 1948 Summer Olympics, the top three teams from 1949 South American Basketball Championship, the EuroBasket 1949 champion and the top two teams from a subsequent European qualifying tournament, and two invitees and Asia were supposed to compete. Uruguay, the South American champion, were refused visas, the Asian teams refused to make the long trip to Argentina, and Italy withdrew for financial reasons.

In the 1954 FIBA World Championship in Brazil, the top four teams in the 1953 South American Basketball Championship, the top 3 teams in EuroBasket 1953 and one invitee from the Americas (Canada) and two invitees from Asia (Formosa and the Philippines) were supposed to participate; however, the Brazilian government refused entry on teams from Communist countries, except Yugoslavia.

The 1959 FIBA World Championship in Chile saw the Olympic champion, the top two teams from 1955 South American Basketball Championship and EuroBasket 1957, and seven invited teams. In the 1963 FIBA World Championship, the Olympic champion and the top three teams from 1961 South American Basketball Championship and EuroBasket 1961 were given places, plus five invited teams, four from the Americas and one from Asia. The Philippines was supposed to host, and Formosa was to be Asia's representative, but were suspended and removed hosting rights by FIBA after the government refused to issue visas to teams from Communist countries. FIBA awarded the World Championship to Brazil, and the Asian berth was instead given to Japan.

=== African, Asian, Central American and Oceanian automatic berths ===
By the 1967 FIBA World Championship in Uruguay, the Summer Olympics and the continental championships in Europe, Central America, South America and Asia became established as qualifying tournaments. The two North American nations, the United States and Canada, could still only qualify via the Olympics or via invitation; Mexico participated via the Centrobasket, which it hosted the inaugural tournament. In the next tournament in the 1970 FIBA World Championship in Yugoslavia, the African champion was given an automatic berth, and regions which didn't have qualifying tournaments, Oceania and North America, were granted invitations. In the 1974 FIBA World Championship, the reigning world champions replaced the Summer Olympics champions on the automatic berth, with the Oceanian champion also qualifying outright; the two North American teams, Canada and the United States were regularly invited as there was no way for them to enter the competition with the Olympics no longer serving as a qualifying tournament. The Summer Olympics returned as an outright qualifying tournament in 1982 when the top three Olympic teams were given berths, but these were again removed in 1986, when two invited teams participated.

=== Americas automatic berths ===
In the first world championship in the open era where professionals were allowed to compete in the 1990 FIBA World Championship in Argentina, the field was reduced to sixteen, and the FIBA Americas Championship were first used to determine the qualifiers from the entire Americas, instead of the separate then-continental championships in Central and South America; these then became qualification tournaments to the Americas championship. This also allowed the USA and Canada to compete in a qualifying tournament other than the Olympics; those two teams are automatically included and do not have to participate in qualifying. In addition, the defending world or Olympic champions weren't given automatic berths, nor where there invited teams. The Summer Olympics became a qualifying tournament again in the 1994 FIBA World Championship in Canada. This setup continued until the 2002 FIBA World Championship in the USA which were also the Olympic champions; the supposed berth for the Olympic champions were instead given to Americas, the USA's home zone.

=== Wild card berths ===
In the 2006 FIBA World Championship in Japan that saw the field expand to 24 teams, with four invited teams popularly called as "wild cards" were invited by FIBA. This setup will last until 2014, when FIBA announced that they were renaming the competition as the "FIBA Basketball World Cup".

=== Home and away qualification ===
In 2012, FIBA announced that the supposed 2018 World Cup would be moved to 2019, the field would expand to 32 teams, and that a new qualification format will be used. Qualification for the 2019 FIBA Basketball World Cup and all succeeding World Cups will see one path of qualification for teams from Asia and Oceania, that the home-and-away system will be used, and that the continental championships will be held quadrennially instead of biennially; and those would no longer be used as qualification tournaments.

=== Participation ===
These are the number of teams that participated in all levels of qualification for the World Cup since 2006:

Year	Teams entered						Map
Year	Africa	Americas	Asia	Europe	Oceania	Total	Map
2006	21	20	28	25	2	96	
2010	23	22	22	39	2	108	
2014	26	24	26	31	2	117	
2019	26	32	31	37	2	128	
2023							

Key to map:

- Blue: Qualified and invited as a wild card
- Light blue: Could still be invited as a wild card (2014 only)
- Yellow: Did not qualify
- Dark gray: Did not enter
- Light gray: Not a member of FIBA
- Black: Disqualified

== Current format ==
Qualification format to be used starting at the 2019 FIBA World Cup:

FIBA zone	First round	Second round	Berths
Hosts	—	Automatic Qualification	1 / 2 in 2023
FIBA Asia + Oceania	Top 3 teams from 4 groups	Group of 6 teams. Points from the first round carry over to the second round. Teams will have 3 home and 3 away games against only teams they did not face at the first round.	7 / 6 in 2023
FIBA Africa	Top 3 teams from 4 groups	Group of 6 teams. Points from the first round carry over to the second round. Teams will have 3 home and 3 away games against only teams they did not face at the first round.	5
FIBA Americas	Top 3 teams from 4 groups	Group of 6 teams. Points from the first round carry over to the second round. Teams will have 3 home and 3 away games against only teams they did not face at the first round.	7
FIBA Europe	—	8 Groups. Teams will have 3 home and 3 away games against each other.	12
Total:			32

== First appearance in qualification ==
The figures below show the first instance a team qualified to the final qualifying tournament (i.e. continental championship). Countries that had not appeared here may have earlier participated in earlier stages of qualification tournaments.

World Cup	Africa	Americas			Asia	Europe	Oceania	Total
World Cup	Africa	North America	Central America & Caribbean	South America	Asia	Europe	Oceania	Total
(Argentina) 1950	Egypt (competed in Europe)	Canada; Cuba; Mexico; United States		Argentina; Brazil; Chile; Paraguay; Peru; Uruguay	Republic of China; Iran; Iraq; Lebanon (competed in Europe); South Korea; Philippines; Syria (competed in Europe)	Belgium; Czechoslovakia; France; Great Britain; Greece; Hungary; Ireland; Italy; Netherlands; Switzerland; Turkey		28
(Brazil) 1954				Colombia		Denmark; Finland; Israel; Romania; Soviet Union; Sweden; West Germany; Yugoslavia		9
(Chile) 1959				Ecuador; Venezuela	Japan; Singapore; Thailand	Albania; Austria; Poland; Scotland	Australia	10
(Brazil) 1963		Puerto Rico				East Germany; England; Spain		4
(Uruguay) 1967			El Salvador; Guatemala; Honduras; Panama; Virgin Islands		Hong Kong; India; Malaysia; South Vietnam			9
(Socialist Federal Republic of Yugoslavia) 1970	Algeria; Central African Republic; Congo; Ivory Coast; Mali; Morocco; Niger; Senegal; Sudan		Dominican Republic; Trinidad and Tobago		Pakistan; Palestine (competed in Africa)			13
(Puerto Rico) 1974	Cameroon; Madagascar; Nigeria; Togo; Tunisia		Guyana		Indonesia			7
(Philippines) 1978	Gambia; Mauritania			Bolivia	Bahrain; China; Sri Lanka		New Zealand	7
(Colombia) 1982	Angola; Mozambique; Zimbabwe							3
(Spain) 1986	Kenya; Guinea				(Chinese Taipei); Jordan	Bulgaria		4
(Argentina) 1990					Bangladesh; Saudi Arabia			2
(Canada) 1994	Gabon				North Korea; Kuwait; United Arab Emirates	Bosnia and Herzegovina; Croatia; Estonia; Latvia; Russia; Slovenia	Samoa	11
(Greece) 1998	South Africa				Kazakhstan	Lithuania; (Yugoslavia); Ukraine	New Caledonia	5
(United States) 2002					Qatar; Uzbekistan			2
(Japan) 2006								0
(Turkey) 2010	Cape Verde; Rwanda					Macedonia		3
(Spain) 2014	Burkina Faso	Jamaica				Czech Republic; Georgia; Montenegro		5
(China) 2019	Chad; Uganda; DR Congo	Bahamas				Armenia; Kosovo; Belarus		7
(Philippines) (Japan) (Indonesia); 2023	South Sudan							1
(Qatar); 2027	Libya	Nicaragua			Guam	Azerbaijan; Cyprus		5
Totals	31	26			30	42	5	131
