= Zambia men's national basketball team =

Zambia
- FIBA ranking: 141 ▼3 (1 September 2026)
- Joined FIBA: 1962
- FIBA zone: FIBA Africa
- National federation: Zambia Basketball Association (ZBA)
- Coach: Mwape Konsolo

Olympic Games
- Appearances: None

FIBA World Cup
- Appearances: None

FIBA Africa Championship
- Appearances: 1 (1989)
- Medals: None
Home	Away

The Zambia national basketball team represents Zambia in international competitions. It is administered by the Zambia Basketball Association (ZBA).

Zambia had its best year in 1989 at the FIBA Africa Championship when it finished in Africa's Top Ten, ahead of Kenya.

At the AfroBasket 2017 qualification, Zambia beat South Africa for the first time in history.

== Current rosters ==
Roster for the AfroBasket 2021 qualification matches played on 22–26 January 2020 against Madagascar and Zimbabwe.

Zambia men's national basketball team roster
Players
Coaches

Pos.	No.	Name	Age – Date of birth	Height	Club
G	4	Nalumino Simioti	21 – 24 October 1998		Lusaka City Council Looters	(Zambia)
G/F	5	Sylvester Samungumbe	25 – 3 November 1994		Napsa Hurricanes	(Zambia)
G/F	6	Spoican Ngoma	25 – 7 November 1994		Matero Magic	(Zambia)
SF	7	Germain Mauwe	28 – 12 August 1991	6 ft 2 in (1.88 m)	Matero Magic	(Zambia)
F/C	8	Douglas Kandulu	23 – 30 June 1996		Matero Magic	(Zambia)
G/F	9	Simukwela Lubinda	33 – 29 August 1986	6 ft 0 in (1.83 m)	Unza Pacers	(Zambia)
G/F	10	Chongo Chona	28 – 24 November 1991	5 ft 11 in (1.8 m)	Matero Magic	(Zambia)
PF	11	Harrison Banda	22 – 1 March 1997	6 ft 4 in (1.93 m)	NAPSA Hurricanes	(Zambia)
SF	12	Maxwell Ngonga	23 – 9 August 1996	5 ft 7 in (1.7 m)	Matero Warriors	(Zambia)
F/C	13	Titus Njovu	29 – 30 April 1990		Matero Warriors	(Zambia)
C	14	Titus Mapani	27 – 25 July 1992	6 ft 3 in (1.91 m)	Munali Suns	(Zambia)
G/F	15	Paul Kashishi	26 – 29 May 1993	6 ft 2 in (1.88 m)	Unza Pacers	(Zambia)

Head coach

- (Zambia) Mwape Konsolo

Assistant coach(es)

- (Zambia) Mulemwa Balamani
- (Canada) Mulenga Mumba

Legend

- Club – describes last
  club before the tournament
- Age – describes age
  on 26 January 2020

=== Depth chart ===
Pos.	Starting 5	Bench 1	Bench 2
C	Titus Njovu	Titus Mapani
PF	Chongo Chona	Harrison Banda	Douglas Kandulu
SF	Spoican Ngoma	Maxwell Ngonga	Germain Mauwe
SG	Simukwela Lubinda	Paul Kashishi	Sylvester Samungumbe
PG	Nalumino Simioti

== Competitive record ==
=== AfroBasket ===
Zambia has qualified for an AfroBasket tournament once, in 1989 when it lost all its five games in Angola and finished 10th.

AfroBasket record						Qualification record			
Year	Round	Position	GP	W	L	GP	W	L	–
(United Arab Republic) 1962	Did not enter or qualify								
(Morocco) 1964	Did not enter or qualify								
(Tunisia) 1965	Did not enter or qualify								
(Morocco) 1968	Did not enter or qualify								
(Egypt) 1970	Did not enter or qualify								
(Senegal) 1972	Did not enter or qualify								
(Central African Republic) 1974	Did not enter or qualify								
(Egypt) 1975	Did not enter or qualify								
(Senegal) 1978	Did not enter or qualify								
(Morocco) 1980	Did not enter or qualify								
(Somalia) 1981	Did not enter or qualify								
(Egypt) 1983	Did not enter or qualify								
(Ivory Coast) 1985	Did not enter or qualify								
(Tunisia) 1987	Did not enter or qualify								
(Angola) 1989	Classification round	10th	5	0	5				
(Egypt) 1992	Did not qualify								
(Kenya) 1993	Did not qualify								
(Algeria) 1995	Did not qualify								
(Senegal) 1997	Did not qualify								
(Angola) 1999	Did not qualify								
(Morocco) 2001	Did not qualify								
(Egypt) 2003	Did not qualify								
(Algeria) 2005	Did not qualify								
(Angola) 2007	Did not qualify								
(Libya) 2009	Did not qualify								
(Madagascar) 2011	Did not qualify					4	1	3	2011
(Ivory Coast) 2013	Did not qualify					5	3	2	2013
(Tunisia) 2015	Did not qualify					Did not enter			
(Senegal) (Tunisia) 2017	Did not qualify					4	1	3	2017
(Rwanda) 2021	Did not qualify					4	1	3	2021
(Angola) 2025	Did not qualify					Did not enter			2025
Total	1/31		5	0	5				–

=== AfroCan ===
FIBA AfroCan record						Qualification record			
Year	Round	Position	GP	W	L	GP	W	L	–
(Mali) 2019	Did not enter					Not held			
(Angola) 2023	Did not qualify					4	2	2	2023
Total	0/2		–	–	–	4	2	2	–

== Head coach position ==
- (Zambia) Lovemore Sikaale - 2013
- (Zambia) Obed Shamboko - 2017
- (Zambia) Mwape Konsolo - 2020

== Past rosters ==
Team for the AfroBasket 2013 qualification.

Zambia men's national basketball team roster
Players
Coaches

Pos.	No.	Name	Age – Date of birth	Height	Club
		Ntilila Sengesenge Chaila	27 – 22 February 1986			(Zambia)
		Francis Chibesa	24 – 29 October 1988			(Zambia)
		Kaumba Chilila	23 – 7 August 1990
		Moonga Chipili	24 – 26 July 1989			(Zambia)
		Zawalika Dala	23 – 25 May 1990
PG		Gosa Isaac Hamudulu	25 – 6 May 1988			(Zambia)
SG		Simukwela Lishomwa Lubinda	26 – 29 August 1986			(Zambia)
		Obert Muleza	32 – 21 March 1981
		Chisulo Candy Musukwa	25 – 27 June 1988			(Zambia)
		Mumba Abraham Mwansa	30 – 13 December 1982			(Zambia)
		Titus Njovu	23 – 30 January 1990			(Zambia)
		Webbie Sikuka	31 – 13 January 1982			(Zambia)
		John Mwandondwa Waitolo	28 – 26 August 1984			(Zambia)

Head coach

- (Zambia) Lovemore Sikaale

Legend

- Club – describes last
  club before the tournament
- Age – describes age
  on 20 August 2013

Team for the FIBA AfroBasket 2017 qualifiers.

Zambia men's national basketball team roster
Players
Coaches

Pos.	No.	Name	Age – Date of birth	Height	Club
	4	Bongani Zulu	23 – 5 June 1993			(Zambia)
	5	Zawalika Daka	26 – 25 May 1990
	6	John Mwandondwa Waitolo	32 – 26 August 1984			(Zambia)
F/C	7	Mumba Abraham Mwansa	34 – 13 December 1982			(Zambia)
	8	Paul Kashishi	23 – 29 May 1993
SG	9	Simukwela Lishomwa Lubinda	30 – 29 August 1986			(Zambia)
PG	10	Gosa Isaac Hamudulu	28 – 6 May 1988			(Zambia)
	11	Chongo Chona	25 – 24 November 1991			(Zambia)
	12	Germain Mauwe	25 – 12 August 1991
	13	Namakando Akalakuka	29 – 28 August 1987			(Zambia)
	14	Francis Chibesa	28 – 29 October 1988			(Zambia)
	15	Moonga Chipili	27 – 26 July 1989			(Zambia)

Head coach

- (Zambia) Obed Shamboko

Assistant coach(es)

- (Australia) Liz Mills

Legend

- Club – describes last
  club before the tournament
- Age – describes age
  on 25 March 2017

At the FIBA AfroBasket 2017 qualifiers, Mumba Abraham Mwansa led the team in minutes, rebounds and blocks per game.
Chongo Chona led his team in total points, Simukwela Lishomwa Lubinda led his team in total assists.

== See also ==
- Zambia women's national basketball team
- Zambia national under-19 basketball team
- Zambia national under-17 basketball team
- Zambia national 3x3 team
