= AfroBasket 2017 qualification =

Basketball competition

AfroBasket 2017 qualification occurred on various dates on 2017. It determined which African national basketball teams qualified for the 2017 FIBA Africa Championship. Teams competed with other teams in their respective "zones" for a spot in the Championship tournament.

== Qualified Teams ==
Two teams qualified for the tournament before the qualification round will take place. Fourteen more teams claimed spots in the tournament through Zonal Qualifying.

Event	Date	Location	Vacancies	Qualified
Host Nation			1	TBA
AfroBasket 2015 Champions		(Tunisia) Tunis	1	Nigeria
AfroBasket 2017 Qualification Zone 1	16–18 March 2017; 24–26 March 2017	(Algeria) Algiers (Tunisia) Tunis	2	Tunisia; Morocco
AfroBasket 2017 Qualification Zone 2	19 March 2017; 26 March 2017	(Mali) Bamako (Senegal) Dakar	2	Senegal; Mali
AfroBasket 2017 Qualification Zone 3	14–18 March 2017; 22–26 March 2017	(Benin) Cotonou (Ivory Coast) Abidjan	1	Ivory Coast
AfroBasket 2017 Qualification Zone 4	24–29 March 2017; 19–20 March 2017	(Cameroon) Yaoundé (Central African Republic) Bangui	2	Cameroon; DR Congo
AfroBasket 2017 Qualification Zone 5	12–18 March 2017	(Egypt) Cairo	2	Uganda; Egypt
AfroBasket 2017 Qualification Zone 6 and Zone 7	25–30 March 2017; 19–25 March 2017	(Zambia) Lusaka (Zimbabwe) Harare	3	Angola; Mozambique; South Africa
AfroBasket 2017 Qualification Wildcard	18 April 2017		2	Rwanda; Guinea
Qualifying tournament	19–21 May 2017	(Mali) Bamako	1	Central African Republic
Total			16	

== Zones ==
=== Zone 1 ===
Zone 1 was played from March 16 to April 1, 2017, in Algeria and Tunisia.

Pos	Team	Pld	W	L	PF	PA	PD	Pts	Qualification
1	Tunisia	4	4	0	311	257	+54	8	Advance to AfroBasket 2017
2	Morocco	4	2	2	277	292	−15	6	Advance to AfroBasket 2017
3	Algeria	4	0	4	275	314	−39	4	

Updated to match(es) played on unknown. Source: Standings

==== First leg ====
March 16

Algeria	71–76	Morocco

Algiers, Algeria

March 17

Morocco	67–79	Tunisia

Algiers, Algeria

March 18

Algeria	77–87	Tunisia

Algiers, Algeria

==== Second leg ====
March 24

Tunisia	71–57	Morocco

Tunis, Tunisia

March 25

Morocco	77–71	Algeria

Tunis, Tunisia

March 26

Tunisia	74–56	Algeria

Tunis, Tunisia

=== Zone 2 ===
The qualifiers were played in a tournament played over two legs with the two top teams qualified. The first leg of the qualifier was played in Bamako on 19 March with the return game following in Dakar a week later.

Pos	Team	Pld	W	L	PF	PA	PD	Pts	Qualification
1	Senegal	6	4	2	392	401	−9	10	Advance to AfroBasket 2017
2	Mali	6	3	3	395	339	+56	9	Advance to AfroBasket 2017
3	Guinea	6	3	3	345	366	−21	9	
4	Cape Verde	6	2	4	370	396	−26	8	

Updated to match(es) played on unknown. Source: Standings

==== First leg ====
March 17

Senegal	78–64	Cape Verde

Bamako, Mali

March 17

Mali	58–62	Guinea

Bamako, Mali

March 18

Guinea	68–55	Senegal

Bamako, Mali

March 18

Cape Verde	54–61	Mali

Bamako, Mali

March 19

Cape Verde	62–56	Guinea

Bamako, Mali

March 19

Mali	82–37	Senegal

Bamako, Mali

==== Second leg ====
March 24

Mali	58–64	Cape Verde

Dakar, Senegal

March 24

Senegal	67–49	Guinea

Dakar, Senegal

March 25

Cape Verde	66–76	Senegal

Dakar, Senegal

March 25

Guinea	43–64	Mali

Dakar, Senegal

March 26

Guinea	67–60	Cape Verde

Dakar, Senegal

March 26

Senegal	79–72 (OT)	Mali

Dakar, Senegal

=== Zone 3 ===
Pos	Team	Pld	W	L	PF	PA	PD	Pts	Qualification
1	Ivory Coast	4	4	0	273	212	+61	8	Advance to AfroBasket 2017
2	Burkina Faso	4	1	3	222	254	−32	5	
3	Benin	4	1	3	219	248	−29	5	

Updated to match(es) played on unknown. Source: Standings

==== First leg ====
March 16

Benin	69–61	Burkina Faso

Cotonou, Benin

March 17

Burkina Faso	48–71	Ivory Coast

Cotonou, Benin

March 18

Benin	55–69	Ivory Coast

Cotonou, Benin

==== Second leg ====
March 24

Ivory Coast	62–52	Benin

Abidjan, Ivory Coast

March 25

Burkina Faso	56–43	Benin

Abidjan, Ivory Coast

March 26

Ivory Coast	71–57	Burkina Faso

Abidjan, Ivory Coast

=== Zone 4 ===
==== Group 1 ====
Pos	Team	Pld	W	L	PF	PA	PD	Pts	Qualification
1	Cameroon	4	4	0	290	229	+61	8	Advance to AfroBasket 2017
2	Chad	4	2	2	273	247	+26	6	
3	Gabon	4	0	4	210	297	−87	4	

Updated to match(es) played on unknown. Source: Standings

March 25

Cameroon	75–62	Chad

Yaoundé, Cameroon

March 26

Chad	71–42	Gabon

Yaoundé, Cameroon

March 27

Cameroon	68–65	Gabon

Yaoundé, Cameroon

March 28

Gabon	60–81	Chad

Yaoundé, Cameroon

March 29

Gabon	43–77	Cameroon

Yaoundé, Cameroon

March 30

Chad	59–70	Cameroon

Yaoundé, Cameroon

==== Group 2 ====
Pos	Team	Pld	W	L	PF	PA	PD	Pts	Qualification
1	DR Congo	2	1	1	161	144	+17	3	Advance to AfroBasket 2017
2	Central African Republic	2	1	1	144	161	−17	3	

Updated to match(es) played on unknown. Source: Standings

March 19

Central African Republic	64–85	DR Congo

Bangui, Central African Republic

March 20

DR Congo	76–80	Central African Republic

Bangui, Central African Republic

=== Zone 5 ===
Eight teams will play a round-robin format tournament - from 12 to 18 March in Cairo, Egypt - to secure the two places for the Final Round.

==== Group A ====
Pos	Team	Pld	W	L	PF	PA	PD	Pts	Qualification
1	Egypt	3	3	0	256	194	+62	6	Advance to Semi Final
2	Rwanda	3	2	1	237	223	+14	5	Advance to Semi Final
3	South Sudan	3	1	2	224	243	−19	4	Advance to Classification Game
4	Kenya	3	0	3	173	230	−57	3	Advance to Classification Game

Updated to match(es) played on unknown. Source: Standings

March 12

Egypt	87–76	South Sudan

Cairo, Egypt

March 13

Rwanda	76–60	Kenya

Cairo, Egypt

March 14

South Sudan	68–66	Kenya

Cairo, Egypt

March 14

Egypt	83–71	Rwanda

Cairo, Egypt

March 15

South Sudan	80–90	Rwanda

Cairo, Egypt

March 15

Kenya	47–89	Egypt

Cairo, Egypt

==== Group B ====
Pos	Team	Pld	W	L	PF	PA	PD	Pts	Qualification
1	Uganda	2	2	0	193	126	+67	4	Advance to Semi Final
2	Burundi	2	1	1	150	172	−22	3	Advance to Semi Final
3	Somalia	2	0	2	155	190	−35	2	Advance to Classification Game

Updated to match(es) played on unknown. Source: Standings

March 13

Uganda	94–72	Somalia

Cairo, Egypt

March 14

Somalia	83–96	Burundi

Cairo, Egypt

March 15

Burundi	54–99	Uganda

Cairo, Egypt

==== Classification Games ====
March 16

Kenya	90–87	Somalia

Cairo, Egypt

March 17

Kenya	84–89 (OT)	South Sudan

Cairo, Egypt

==== Semi-final ====
March 17

Uganda	77–63	Rwanda

Cairo, Egypt

March 17

Egypt	135–71	Burundi

Cairo, Egypt

==== Third-place game ====
March 18

Rwanda	89–75	Burundi

Cairo, Egypt

==== Final ====
March 18

Uganda	72–95	Egypt

Cairo, Egypt

=== Zone 6 and Zone 7 ===
The winner of each group will secure automatic qualification for Africa's flagship competition taking place in Brazzaville, while the teams that finish second in Groups G and H will face each other for the remaining qualification spot.

==== Group 1 ====
Group 1 will be played from 25 to 30 March in Lusaka, Zambia to secure one place for the Final Round.

Pos	Team	Pld	W	L	PF	PA	PD	Pts	Qualification
1	Angola	4	4	0	340	207	+133	8	Advance to AfroBasket 2017
2	South Africa	4	1	3	271	315	−44	5	Advance to Playoff Game
3	Zambia	4	1	3	236	325	−89	5	

Updated to match(es) played on unknown. Source: Standings

Sat, 25 Mar 2017
18:00 CAT (UTC+2)

Boxscore

Zambia	55–92	South Africa
Scoring by quarter: 17–24, 12–20, 26–18, 0–30
Pts: Chona 13; Rebs: Mwansa 7 Asts: Lubinda 4		Pts: Mothiba 20; Rebs: Mothiba 9 Asts: Ngobeni, Sithole 3

Lusaka, Zambia

Sun, 26 Mar 2017
18:00 CAT (UTC+2)

Boxscore

South Africa	51–87	Angola
Scoring by quarter: 12–23, 4–20, 11–25, 24–19
Pts: Van Der Bijl 11; Rebs: Van Der Bijl 4 Asts: Ngobeni 3		Pts: Leonel 14; Rebs: Vander 10; Asts: Armando 5

Lusaka, Zambia

Mon, 27 Mar 2017
18:00 CAT (UTC+2)

Boxscore

Zambia	54–79	Angola
Scoring by quarter: 10–32, 10–17, 14–19, 20–11
Pts: Zulu 13; Rebs: Mwansa 7 Asts: Mwansa 5		Pts: Miller 15; Rebs: Vander, Lukeny 4 Asts: Olímpio 6

Lusaka, Zambia

Tue, 28 Mar 2017
18:00 CAT (UTC+2)

Boxscore

South Africa	71–82	Zambia
Scoring by quarter: 10–20, 20–9, 14–22, 27–31
Pts: Van Der Bijl 17; Rebs: Mothiba 10; Asts: Mothiba, Ngoetjana 2		Pts: Chona 20; Rebs: Chona, Mwansa 8 Asts: Zulu, Hamudulu 5

Lusaka, Zambia

Wed, 29 Mar 2017
18:00 CAT (UTC+2)

Boxscore

Angola	91–57	South Africa
Scoring by quarter: 20–17, 25–6, 27–18, 19–16
Pts: Mingas 15; Rebs: Moore 7 Asts: Lukeny 7		Pts: Ngoetjana 14; Rebs: Ngoetjana, MacLean 5 Asts: MacLean 3

Lusaka, Zambia

Thu, 30 Mar 2017
18:00 CAT (UTC+2)

Boxscore

Angola	83–45	Zambia
Scoring by quarter: 28–2, 14–12, 24–12, 17–19
Pts: Olímpio 20; Rebs: Moore, Mingas 7 Asts: Olímpio, Armando 4		Pts: Chipili, Daka 8 Rebs: Kashishi 8 Asts: Lubinda 3

Lusaka, Zambia

==== Group 2 ====
Group 2 will be played from 19 to 25 March in Harare, Zimbabwe to secure one place for the Final Round.

Pos	Team	Pld	W	L	PF	PA	PD	Pts	Qualification
1	Mozambique	1	1	0	165	133	+32	2	Advance to AfroBasket 2017
2	Zimbabwe	1	0	1	133	165	−32	1	Advance to Playoff Game

Updated to match(es) played on unknown. Source: Standings

March 18

Zimbabwe	68–80	Mozambique

Harare, Zimbabwe

March 19

Mozambique	85–65	Zimbabwe

Harare, Zimbabwe

==== Playoff game ====
April 14

South Africa	74–67	Zimbabwe

Johannesburg, South Africa

April 15

Zimbabwe	70–68	South Africa

Johannesburg, South Africa

=== Wildcard ===
FIBA Africa's executive committee on Tuesday, 18 April awarded the two wild cards for FIBA AfroBasket 2017 to Guinea and Rwanda.

=== Qualifying tournament ===
Chad, the Central African Republic and Zimbabwe faced off in Bamako, Mali from 19 to 21 May, with the winner of this additional qualifier filling the void left by the Republic of Congo.

Pos	Team	Pld	W	L	PF	PA	PD	Pts	Qualification
1	Central African Republic	2	2	0	146	119	+27	4	Advance to AfroBasket 2017
2	Chad	2	1	1	121	112	+9	3	
3	Zimbabwe	2	0	2	100	136	−36	2	

Updated to match(es) played on unknown. Source: Standings

19 May 2017

Zimbabwe	55–79	Central African Republic

Bamako, Mali

20 May 2017

Chad	57–45	Zimbabwe

Bamako, Mali

21 May 2017

Central African Republic	67–64	Chad

Bamako, Mali
