= 2014 FIBA Basketball World Cup qualification =

The 2014 FIBA Basketball World Cup qualification began in earnest at the 2011 Caribbean Championships, a qualifier to the 2012 Centrobasket, which was in itself a qualifier to the 2013 FIBA Americas Championship. The winners of the 2012 Olympic basketball tournament, the United States, qualified outright. The USA joined the host nation Spain, which was earlier elected to host the 2014 FIBA Basketball World Cup in July 2009.

Qualification would be via each of FIBA's zones, with each zone allocated at least two berths, with additional berths given according to the strengths of the teams within each zone. In this setup, FIBA Europe got six berths, FIBA Americas had 4, FIBA Africa and FIBA Asia, 3 teams each, and FIBA Oceania, 2 berths.

The continental championships in each FIBA zone doubled as a qualifying tournament. The top teams in each tournament qualified to the Basketball World Cup.

In addition, after the continental championships were done, four more wild cards berths were awarded by FIBA to complete the 24-team tournament.

This was the final set of qualification tournaments under this method. FIBA announced that the next edition of the World Cup would be held in 2019, the number of participating teams raised from 24 to 32, FIBA Asia and FIBA Oceania combined into one region for purposes of qualifying for the World Cup, and that qualifying will be done in a home and away format.

== Method ==
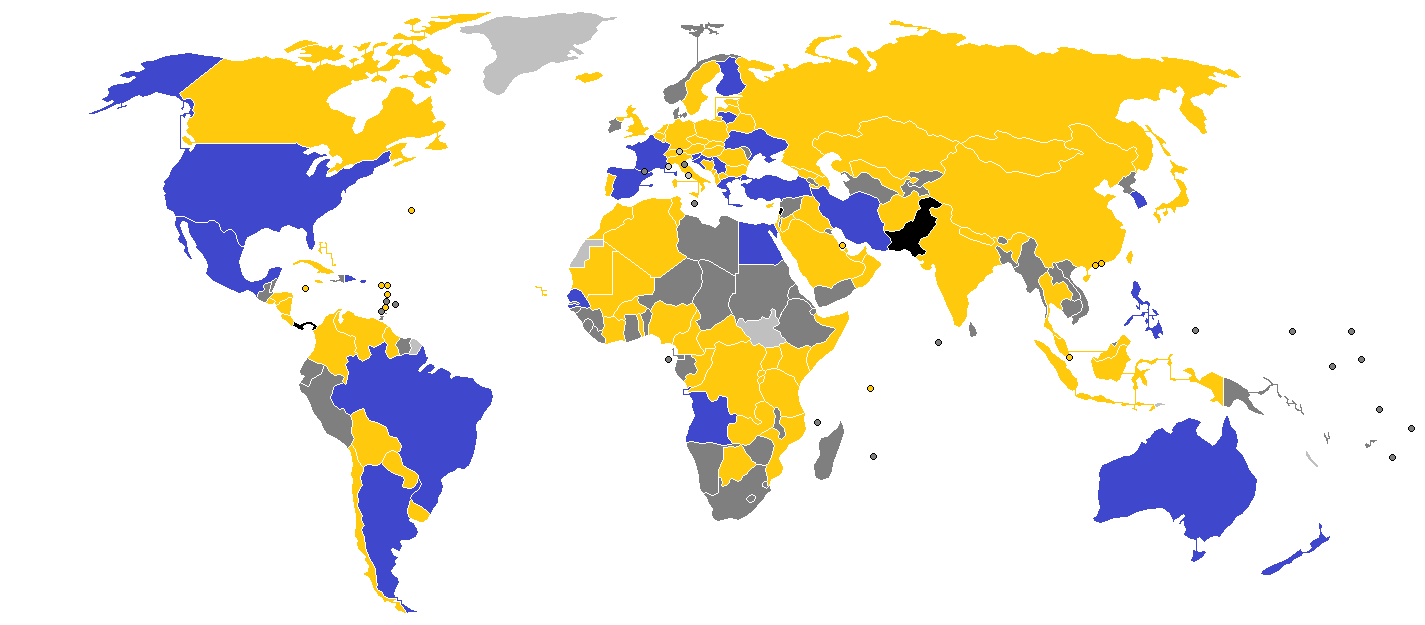
Final status of national teams that participated in any stage of qualifying for the 2014 Basketball World Cup. Qualified Eliminated Did not enter Disqualified and suspended by FIBA Not a member of FIBA

Each FIBA zone has a default number of berths, generally following the strengths of the national teams there. These berths, plus four wild cards and the host total in 24. However, a berth is subtracted from the FIBA zone of the Olympic champion; in this case, the United States' gold medal in 2012 reduced FIBA Americas' number of berths from five to four, with the United States qualifying as a result of their 2012 Olympic gold medal.

FIBA zone	Qualifying tournaments			World Cup berths			
FIBA zone	Automatic	Teams entered	Total berths	Automatic	After the 2012 Olympics	Berth as the host nation	Total berths
2012 Olympic gold medalist	—N/a	—N/a	12	0	+1	0	1
FIBA Africa	4	23	16	3	0	0	3
FIBA Americas	6	9	10	5	−1	0	4
FIBA Asia	2	25	15	3	0	0	3
FIBA Europe	8	31	24	6	0	1	7
FIBA Oceania	2	—N/a	2	2	0	0	2
Wild card	—N/a	—N/a	15	4	0	0	4
Total	22	88	—N/a	23	0	1	24

A total of 117 national teams participated in qualifying. This number included teams that participated but were later suspended (Lebanon and Panama), and excluded hosts Spain, which still participated in qualifying matches, and the United States, which qualified automatically and no longer participated in qualifying matches.

While the different FIBA zones employed any method in qualifying, all conducted their continental championships as qualifying tournaments. Therefore, these continental championships, along with the qualifying for these championships, serve as qualifying matches. In total, 606 qualifying matches were played to determine the qualified teams; excluding the Olympics, 568 matches were played.

=== List ===
These were listed by order of qualification.

Team	Qualification		Appearance			Best performance	FIBA World Ranking
Team	As	Date	Last	Total	Streak	Best performance	FIBA World Ranking
Spain	Host	23 May 2009	2010	11	9	Champions (2006) / Final	2
United States	Gold medalist at the 2012 Summer Olympics	12 August 2012	2010	17	17	Champions (1954, 1986, 1994, 2010) / Final round (1954), Final (1986, 1994, 2010)	1
Iran	Top 3 at the 2013 FIBA Asia Championship	10 August 2013	2010	2	2	19th place (2010) / Classification round	20
Philippines	Top 3 at the 2013 FIBA Asia Championship	10 August 2013	1978	5	1	3rd place (1954) / Final round	34
South Korea	Top 3 at the 2013 FIBA Asia Championship	11 August 2013	1998	7	1	11th place (1970) / Preliminary round	31
Australia	Top 2 at the 2013 FIBA Oceania Championship	18 August 2013	2010	11	3	5th place (1982, 1994) / Final round (1982), Second round (1994)	9
New Zealand	Top 2 at the 2013 FIBA Oceania Championship	18 August 2013	2010	5	4	4th place (2002) / Third place playoff	19
Angola	Top 3 at the 2013 FIBA Africa Championship	30 August 2013	2010	7	4	9th place (2006) / Round of 16	15
Egypt	Top 3 at the 2013 FIBA Africa Championship	30 August 2013	1994	6	1	5th place (1950) / Final round	46
Senegal	Top 3 at the 2013 FIBA Africa Championship	31 August 2013	2006	4	1	14th place (1978) / Preliminary round	41
Puerto Rico	Top 4 at the 2013 FIBA Americas Championship	7 September 2013	2010	12	8	4th place (1990) / Third place playoff	17
Dominican Republic	Top 4 at the 2013 FIBA Americas Championship	8 September 2013	1978	2	1	12th place (1978) / Preliminary round	26
Argentina	Top 4 at the 2013 FIBA Americas Championship	8 September 2013	2010	13	8	Champions (1950) / Final round	3
Mexico	Top 4 at the 2013 FIBA Americas Championship	8 September 2013	1974	5	1	8th place (1967) / Preliminary round	24
France	Top 6 (excluding Spain) at the EuroBasket 2013	18 September 2013	2010	6	3	4th place (1954) / Final round	8
Slovenia*	Top 6 (excluding Spain) at the EuroBasket 2013	19 September 2013	2010	3	3	8th place (2010) / Quarterfinals	13
Croatia*	Top 6 (excluding Spain) at the EuroBasket 2013	19 September 2013	2010	3	2	3rd place (1994) / Third place playoff	16
Lithuania**	Top 6 (excluding Spain) at the EuroBasket 2013	19 September 2013	2010	4	3	3rd place (2010) / Third place playoff	4
Ukraine**	Top 6 (excluding Spain) at the EuroBasket 2013	20 September 2013	—N/a	1	1	Debut	45
Serbia	Top 6 (excluding Spain) at the EuroBasket 2013	21 September 2013	2010	2	2	4th (2010)	11
Brazil	Wild card selection	1 February 2014	2010	17	17	Champions (1959, 1953) / Final round	10
Finland	Wild card selection	1 February 2014	—N/a	1	1	Debut	39
Greece	Wild card selection	1 February 2014	2010	6	3	2nd place (2006) / Final	5
Turkey	Wild card selection	1 February 2014	2010	4	4	2nd place (2010) / Final	7

*Previously a part of Yugoslavia that had 11 appearances, and won in 1970, 1978 and 1990.
**Previously a part of the Soviet Union that had 9 appearances, and won in 1967, 1974 and 1982.

== Automatic qualifiers ==
Advanced to the World Cup outright
Already in the World Cup, but still participated in qualification
Advanced to the World Cup as a wild card
Advanced to the continental championship outright
Already in the continental championship, but still participated in qualification
Advanced to the continental championship as a wild card
Advanced to next round of qualifying
Disqualified and suspended by FIBA

Automatic qualifiers
	Team
Host	Spain
2012 Olympics gold medalists	United States

== 2012 Summer Olympics ==
The United States defeated Spain in a rematch of the 2008 gold medal game. The United States qualified automatically to the World Cup, taking one of FIBA Americas' five berths.

Rank	Team
1st	United States
2nd	Spain
3rd	Russia
4th	Argentina
5th	Brazil
6th	France
7th	Australia
8th	Lithuania
9th	Great Britain
10th	Nigeria
11th	Tunisia
12th	China

== FIBA Africa ==
The 2013 FIBA Africa Championship in the Ivory Coast served as the qualifying tournament. With three outright berths, the top three teams qualified. This meant the finalists and the winner of the third-place playoff progressed.

=== FIBA Africa Championship qualifying ===
Automatic qualifiers
	Team
Host	Ivory Coast
Top 3 in 2011 FIBA Africa Championship	Tunisia
Top 3 in 2011 FIBA Africa Championship	Angola
Top 3 in 2011 FIBA Africa Championship	Nigeria

Zone 1
Rank	Team
1st	Morocco
2nd	Algeria

Zone 2
Rank	Team
1st	Senegal
2nd	Cape Verde
3rd	Mali
4th	Mauritania

Zone 3
Rank	Team
1st	Burkina Faso
2nd	Togo

Zone 4
Rank	Team
1st	Central African Republic
2nd	Cameroon
3rd	Congo
4th	DR Congo

Zone 5
Rank	Team
1st	Egypt
2nd	Rwanda
3rd	Kenya
4th	Somalia
5th	Uganda
6th	Tanzania

Zone 6
Rank	Team
1st	Mozambique
2nd	Zambia
3rd	Botswana
4th	Seychelles

=== FIBA Africa Championship ===
Egypt, which qualified after making their last appearance in 1994, and perennial qualifiers Angola got the first two berths for FIBA Africa after advancing to the final of the 2013 FIBA Africa Championship. Senegal defeated host team Ivory Coast on the third-place playoff via a last-second four-point play to take Africa's last outright berth.

Rank	Team
1st	Angola
2nd	Egypt
3rd	Senegal
4th	Ivory Coast
5th	Cameroon
6th	Cape Verde
7th	Nigeria
8th	Morocco
9th	Tunisia
10th	Rwanda
11th	Mozambique
12th	Algeria
13th	Central African Republic
14th	Congo
15th	Mali
16th	Burkina Faso

== FIBA Americas ==
The 2013 FIBA Americas Championship in Venezuela served as the qualifying tournament. With four outright berths, the top four teams qualified. This meant the semifinalists progressed.

=== FIBA Americas Championship qualifying ===
Automatic qualifiers
	Team
Host	Venezuela
North American Zone	Canada

Caribbean
Rank	Team
1st	Virgin Islands
2nd	Bahamas
3rd	Jamaica
4th	British Virgin Islands
5th	Bermuda
6th	Antigua and Barbuda
7th	Guyana
8th	Saint Vincent and the Grenadines
9th	Cayman Islands

Central America & Caribbean
Rank	Team
1st	Dominican Republic
2nd	Puerto Rico
3rd	Jamaica
4th	Panama
5th	Bahamas
6th	Mexico
7th	Virgin Islands
8th	Cuba
9th	Costa Rica; Nicaragua

South America
Rank	Team
1st	Argentina
2nd	Venezuela
3rd	Uruguay
4th	Brazil
5th	Paraguay
6th	Chile
7th	Bolivia; Colombia

=== FIBA Americas Championship ===
On 7 September 2013, Puerto Rico secured their classification to the World Cup after defeating hosts Venezuela 86–85 after extra time in the 2013 FIBA Americas Championship. The next day, the Dominican Republic eliminated Uruguay to qualify; this is the first appearance of the Dominicans in the World Cup since 1978. In the next game, Argentina's victory over Canada ensured that they and Mexico, the 2013 FIBA Americas Champions, qualify, thereby eliminating the Canadians and host Venezuela; the Mexicans returned to the World Cup after their last appearance in 1974. Brazil was chosen as a wild card for the World Cup after having previously lost all three games against Canada, Puerto Rico and Jamaica.

Rank	Team
1st	Mexico
2nd	Puerto Rico
3rd	Argentina
4th	Dominican Republic
5th	Venezuela
6th	Canada
7th	Uruguay
8th	Jamaica
9th	Brazil
10th	Paraguay

== FIBA Asia ==
The 2013 FIBA Asia Championship in the Philippines served as the qualifying tournament. With three outright berths, the top three teams qualified. This meant the finalists and the winner of the third-place playoff progressed.

=== FIBA Asia Championship qualifying ===
Automatic qualifiers
	Team
Host	Philippines
2012 FIBA Asia Cup champion	Iran

2012 FIBA Asia Cup
Rank	Team
1st	Iran
2nd	Japan
3rd	Qatar
4th	Philippines
5th	China
6th	Chinese Taipei
7th	Lebanon
8th	Uzbekistan
9th	India; Macau

Central Asia
Rank	Team
1st	Kazakhstan
2nd	Uzbekistan

East Asia
Rank	Team
1st	South Korea
2nd	China
3rd	Japan
4th	Hong Kong
5th	Chinese Taipei
6th	Mongolia
7th	Macau

Gulf
Rank	Team
1st	Qatar
2nd	Bahrain
3rd	Saudi Arabia
4th	United Arab Emirates
5th	Oman

South Asia
Rank	Team
1st	India
2nd	Afghanistan
3rd	Nepal

Southeast Asia
Rank	Team
1st	Thailand
2nd	Malaysia
3rd	Singapore
4th	Indonesia

West Asia
Rank	Team
1st	Iran
2nd	Lebanon
3rd	Jordan
4th	Iraq

=== FIBA Asia Championship ===
Iran and the Philippines became the first teams to qualify via the 2013 FIBA Asia Championship in Manila by advancing to the final. Iran made their second consecutive appearance while the Philippines qualified for the World Cup after 35 years of missing the tournament, their last appearance being in 1978 when they hosted the event. Korea, whose last appearance was in 1998, took the third and last automatic Asian berth after winning third place in the said tournament.

Rank	Team
1st	Iran
2nd	Philippines
3rd	South Korea
4th	Chinese Taipei
5th	China
6th	Qatar
7th	Jordan
8th	Kazakhstan
9th	Japan
10th	Hong Kong
11th	India
12th	Bahrain
13th	Saudi Arabia
14th	Thailand
15th	Malaysia

== FIBA Europe ==
The EuroBasket 2013 in Slovenia served as the qualifying tournament. With six outright berths, the top six teams qualified. This meant the semifinalists and the participants in the fifth-place playoff progressed. Spain, which has qualified already, participated, finishing within the top six. With this, the seventh-placed team took its place.

=== FIBA EuroBasket qualifying ===
Automatic qualifiers
	Team
Host	Slovenia
2012 Olympics participants	France; Great Britain; Lithuania; Russia; Spain
2012 Olympic qualifying tournament participants	Greece; North Macedonia

Group A
Rank	Team
1st	Montenegro
2nd	Israel
3rd	Serbia
4th	Estonia
5th	Iceland
6th	Slovakia

Group B
Rank	Team
1st	Germany
2nd	Sweden
3rd	Bulgaria
4th	Azerbaijan
5th	Luxembourg

Group C
Rank	Team
1st	Croatia
2nd	Ukraine
3rd	Austria
4th	Hungary
5th	Cyprus

Group D
Rank	Team
1st	Bosnia and Herzegovina
2nd	Georgia
3rd	Latvia
4th	Netherlands
5th	Romania

Group E
Rank	Team
1st	Poland
2nd	Finland
3rd	Belgium
4th	Switzerland
5th	Albania

Group F
Rank	Team
1st	Italy
2nd	Turkey
3rd	Czech Republic
4th	Belarus
5th	Portugal

=== FIBA EuroBasket ===
On 18 September 2013, France secured their third consecutive qualification to the World Cup after beating hosts Slovenia in the EuroBasket 2013 quarterfinals. On the next day, Slovenia qualified after beating Serbia in the 5th–8th Semifinals, while Croatia defeated Ukraine, and Lithuania defeated Italy to both grab tickets to the final tournament. On 20 September 2013, Ukraine qualified for the first time ever after defeating Italy. On the next day, Serbia bounced back from two consecutive losses to win against Italy that led them to the FIBA World Cup after snatching the last outright remaining berth at the EuroBasket 2013. Finland, Greece and Turkey were selected as wild cards for the World Cup berth on 1 February, with Finland, along with newcomers Ukraine, marking their FIBA World Cup debut.

Rank	Team
1st	France
2nd	Lithuania
3rd	Spain
4th	Croatia
5th	Slovenia
6th	Ukraine
7th	Serbia
8th	Italy
9th	Belgium
9th	Finland
11th	Greece
11th	Latvia
13th	Bosnia and Herzegovina; Czech Republic; Great Britain; Sweden
17th	Georgia; Germany; Montenegro
17th	Turkey
21st	Israel; North Macedonia; Poland; Russia

== FIBA Oceania ==
The 2013 FIBA Oceania Championship was a two-legged tie between Australia and New Zealand. Since FIBA Oceania had two outright berths, this meant both teams were already qualified in the 2014 Basketball World Cup provided a team didn't forfeit a match.

Rank	Team
1st	Australia
2nd	New Zealand

== Wild card ==
FIBA selected four wild cards after all of the continental championships were done. FIBA was prohibited from selecting more than three teams from the same continental zone and from selecting teams that did not participate in qualifying either through choice or FIBA-mandated suspension.

On 31 October, FIBA announced that fifteen teams submitted wild card applications. These were:

- Africa: Nigeria
- Americas: Brazil, Canada and Venezuela
- Asia: China and Qatar
- Europe: Bosnia and Herzegovina, Finland, Germany, Greece, Israel, Italy, Poland, Russia and Turkey

Of those fifteen, Italy and Germany withdrew before the meeting in Barcelona on 3 February, citing financial reasons. Germany indicated that it was willing to pay up to 300,000 euros for a place but that the sum required by FIBA to receive a place at the World Cup was more in the range of 1 million euros. Gianni Petrucci, chairman of the Italian federation stated that to make an offer in excess of 800,000 euros for a spot would be unethical. On 30 January, a report from Spanish sports newspaper El Mundo Deportivo said that China and Russia also withdrew from wild card contention. There had been no official confirmation from either FIBA or the Chinese or Russian federations on the reported withdrawal. A day later, it was confirmed that the Chinese indeed withdrew from the wild card race, as they could not form a viable team.

On 1 February, FIBA announced that its Central Board awarded the wild cards to Brazil, Finland, Greece and Turkey.
