= Gundo =

Gundo may refer to:

- The technology companies of the city of El Segundo, California
- Ronnie Gundo, Kenyan basketball player (born 1991)
