= Lycée Romain Rolland =

Lycée Romain Rolland may refer to the following French schools:

- Lycée Romain Rolland (Amiens) - Amiens
- Lycée Romain Rolland (Clamecy) - Clamecy, Nièvre
- Lycée Romain Rolland (Goussainville, Val-d'Oise)
- Lycée Romain Rolland (Ivry-sur-Seine) - Ivry-sur-Seine
