= Thérence =

Thérence is a given name. Notable people with the name include:

- Thérence Mayimba (born 1995), Gabonese and French basketball player
- Thérence Sinunguruza (1959–2020), Burundian Tutsi politician
- Thérence Koudou (born 2004), French footballer

== See also ==
- Sainte-Thérence, commune in France
