= Miguel Ángel Hoyo =

Spanish basketball coach

CSU Sibiu
- Position: Head coach
- League: Liga Națională

Personal information
- Born: 10 November 1973 (age 53) Ceuta, Spain
- Coaching career: 1999–present

Career history

Coaching
- 1999–2002: Básquet Coruña (assistant)
- 2002–2003: Básquet Coruña
- 2003–2005: C.B. Sarria Rio Calcio
- 2005–2006: Leche Río Breogán (assistant)
- 2006–2011: CB Granada (assistant)
- 2012–2014: Malabo Kings
- 2014–2015: Hørsholm 79ers
- 2015–2016: Xuventude Baloncesto
- 2017–2018: Eskişehir Basket (assistant)
- 2018–2021: Saski Baskonia B
- 2021–present: CSU Sibiu

Career highlights
- Equatorial Guinea Basketball League champion (2013); Equatorial Guinea Basketball Cup champion (2013)

Miguel Ángel Hoyo Ramos (born 11 October 1973) is a Spanish basketball head coach for CSU Sibiu of the Liga Națională.

== Professional career ==
In 2013, Hoyo was offered a coaching offer by the club director of the Malabo Kings of the Equatorian Basketball League. He gladly accepted their offer and described his coaching philosophy as local-centric as much as possible with principles from the European style of basketball. He then guided the team to a league title and league cup within that season.

In December 2021, he accepted a coaching offer at Romania wherein he would be the head coach for the CSU Sibiu of the Liga Națională.

== Ivory Coast national team ==
He has been head coach for Ivory Coast's national team for the 2025 FIBA AfroBasket.

== Coaching Style ==
Hoyo stated that he is a defensive-oriented coach wherein he pushes his players to the limit when it comes to the defensive side. On the offensive side, he said that: "I like the player to make his own decisions on the court and within that we have a concept game where the player is always free to play his 1x1 if he has the ball and to play without the ball depending on what his partner does. . I try to make the player think and be able to read and understand the game."
