= Kevin Franceschi =

Moroccan basketball player (born 1993)

No. 0 – FUS Rabat
- Position: Small forward
- League: Division Excellence

Personal information
- Born: 5 October 1993 (age 33) Argenteuil, France
- Listed height: 1.93 m (6 ft 4 in)
- Listed weight: 86 kg (190 lb)

Career information
- High school: Lycée Romain Rolland
- College: Oklahoma Baptist (2016–2017)
- NBA draft: 2017: undrafted

Career history
- 2017-2018: Real Murcia
- 2018-2019: Agriniou
- 2020-2021: Paris Basketball
- 2021-2022: Brussels
- 2022: AMI Basket
- 2022: Ittihad Tanger
- 2022-present: FUS Rabat

Career highlights
- Division Excellence champion (2023); Moroccan Cup winner (2022)
Medals
Men's basketball
Representing Morocco
FIBA AfroCan
Gold medal – first place	Angola 2023

Kevin Bruno Franceschi (born 5 October 1993) is a French-Moroccan basketball player. He is a 1.93 m (6 ft 4 in) small forward, and plays for the Morocco national team. Franceschi is most known for winning gold at 2023 FIBA AfroCan with Morocco, and winning the tournament's MVP award.

== Early life and college career ==
Born in Argenteuil, a commune in Île-de-France, Franceschi's mother is Moroccan and his father Italian. He grew up in Argenteuil, where there is large Moroccan community, and spent his summers in Agadir.

He attended high school at the Lycée Romain Rolland. He attended the University of Missouri–Kansas City in the United States, combining his studies in marketing management with basketball. In the 2016–17 season, he played for the Oklahoma Baptist Bison of the Oklahoma Baptist University.

== Professional career ==
Franceschi started his pro career in 2017 with Real Murcia Baloncesto of the LEB Plata, the Spanish third level. The following year, he played in Greece for Agriniou B.C. in the Greek A2 and averaged career-high 16.5 points per game.

In the 2020–21 season, he played his first season in his native France with Paris Basketball, appearing in 11 games in the LNB Pro B.

Franceschi signed with Brussels of the Belgian BNXT League for the 2022–23 season. In February 2023, Franceschi left Brussels to play in Morocco, in the top-flight league Division Excellence. He started out with AMI Basket, however the team was forced to suspend its operations. Franceschi moved to Ittihad Tanger, he won the Moroccan Throne Cup in 2022. With FUS Rabat, he won the 2023 national championship which was the team's first since a 19-year drought.

== National team career ==
Franceschi is most known for winning gold at 2023 FIBA AfroCan with Morocco, and winning the tournament's MVP award. He averaged 12.8 points, 2.8 rebounds and 3 assists per game.
