= Heroes Play United =

Zambian basketball team

Heroes Play United is a Zambian basketball team that plays in the Zambia Basketball League.

They were founded as the BOZ Heroes, named after their main sponsor Bank of Zambia. In 2015, they were demoted to the national second division. They played in the 2012 FIBA Africa Clubs Champions Cup. Australian Liz Mills coached the team during the 2011–12 season.

== Honours ==
Zambia Basketball League

- Champions: 2003, 2004, 2012
