= AfroCan =

African basketball competition

- Upcoming season or competition: 2027 FIBA AfroCan
- Sport: Basketball
- Founded: 2019
- First season: 2019
- No. of teams: 12
- Country: FIBA Africa member nations
- Continent: FIBA Africa (Africa)
- Most recent champion: Morocco (1st title)
- Most titles: DR Congo; Morocco (1 title each)
- Website: FIBA Africa

The AfroCan (alternatively known as the FIBA AfroCan) is a men's basketball continental competition in Africa, which is played quadannually under the auspices of FIBA (International Basketball Federation), basketball's international governing body, and the FIBA African zone thereof. Unlike the AfroBasket, AfroCan is only opened to all players who play for basketball clubs based in Africa.

== History ==
In 2017, a new calendar by FIBA changed the AfroBasket from a biennial to quadrennial tournament. As a consequence, the AfroCan was created to vill up the void.

The inaugural edition was held in 2019 in Bamako, Mali between 19 and 28 July, with DR Congo winning the first edition title after beating Kenya 81–62 in the final.

The second edition was held in 2023 in Luanda, Angola between 8 and 16 July. Morocco won their first title after beating Ivory Coast 78–76 in the final.

== Summaries ==
Year	Hosts	Final			Third place match		
Year	Hosts	Winners	Score	Runners-up	Third place	Score	Fourth place
2019; Details	(Mali); Bamako	DR Congo	81–62	Kenya	Angola	88–71	Morocco
2023; Details	(Angola); Luanda	Morocco	78–76	Ivory Coast	Rwanda	82–73	DR Congo
2027; Details	(Rwanda); Kigali						

== Performances by nation ==
Rank	Nation	Gold	Silver	Bronze	Total
1	DR Congo	1	0	0	1
1	Morocco	1	0	0	1
3	Ivory Coast	0	1	0	1
3	Kenya	0	1	0	1
5	Angola	0	0	1	1
5	Rwanda	0	0	1	1
Totals (6 entries)		2	2	2	6

== Participation details ==
Nation	(Mali) 2019	(Angola) 2023	(Rwanda) 2027	Total
Algeria	8th	–	TBD	1
Angola	3rd	7th	TBD	2
Cameroon	–	11th	TBD	1
Chad	6th	–	TBD	1
DR Congo	1st	4th	Q	3
Ivory Coast	10th	2nd	Q	3
Egypt	9th	–	TBD	1
Gabon	–	9th	TBD	1
Guinea	12th	–	TBD	1
Kenya	2nd	6th	TBD	2
Mali	5th	12th	TBD	2
Morocco	4th	1st	Q	3
Mozambique	–	10th	TBD	1
Nigeria	11th	8th	TBD	2
Rwanda	–	3rd	Q	2
Tunisia	7th	5th	TBD	2

== Debut of teams ==
A total of 16 national teams have appeared in at least one FIBA AfroCan in the history of the tournament through the 2023 competition. Each successive AfroCan has had at least one team appearing for the first time. Countries competing in their first AfroCan are listed below by year.

Year	Debutants	Number
2019	Algeria, Angola, Chad, DR Congo, Ivory Coast, Egypt, Guinea, Kenya, Mali, Morocco, Nigeria, Tunisia	12
2023	Cameroon, Gabon, Mozambique, Rwanda	16
2022	TBD	16
Total		16

== Most Valuable Player ==
Year	Player	Ref.
2019	(Democratic Republic of the Congo) Maxi Munanga Shamba	
2023	Kevin Franceschi	

== See also ==
- AfroBasket
