= Liz Mills =

Australian basketball coach

Bangui Sporting Club
- Position: Head coach
- League: BAL

Personal information
- Born: Sydney, Australia
- Coaching career: 2002–present

Career history

Coaching
- 2002–2011: Northern Suburbs Basketball Association
- 2011–2013: Heroes Play United
- 2012: Zambia National University Team
- 2015–2016: Matero Magic
- 2017: Zambia men's national team (assistant)
- 2018: Cameroon men's national team (assistant)
- 2019: Patriots
- 2021: Kenya men's national team
- 2022: AS Salé
- 2022–2023: ABC Fighters
- 2023–2024: Bangui Sporting Club

Liz Mills is an Australian basketball coach who, since 2011, has coached elite level men's club and national basketball teams in Africa. Mills is the former head coach of Bangui Sporting Club for the 2023 Road to BAL (Basketball Africa League).

Mills is the first female basketball head coach to lead a men's national team at a FIBA continental championship, as well as the first-ever female head coach in the Basketball Africa League (BAL) after debuting in 2022. She is also the first female head coach of a men's club team in Morocco, and subsequently in North Africa and the Middle East.

Mills began her coaching career in Sydney, in 2002 working with junior boys and girls teams, as well as senior women's teams. Since 2011, Mills has been a head coach and assistant coach in Africa of senior men's club teams, national men's university teams and national men's teams.

In 2021, Mills was the head coach of the Kenyan men's national team, becoming the only woman in the world at that time in charge of a men's national team not only in basketball but in any major sport. When she coached Kenya at AfroBasket 2021, she became the first and only female head coach in a men's continental championship (Afrobasket) since the International Basketball Federation FIBA was founded in 1932.

== Coaching career ==
Mills began her basketball coaching career in Sydney, Australia in 2002 whilst still in high school (Willoughby Girls High). She has coached junior boys and girls club teams, as well as representative girls teams for Northern Suburbs Basketball Association (NSBA), a representative club in North Sydney, Australia. Prior to relocating to Africa she coached a senior women's representative team for NSBA.

Whilst in Australia she completed an undergraduate degree in Sports Science and Sports Management (2008) at the University of Technology Sydney (UTS) and in 2014 completed a Masters of Education in Sports Coaching at the University of Sydney (USYD).

Prior to 2011, Mills had never coached men. Mills started her coaching career in Africa in Zambia, where she was the head coach for Zambia's senior men's national league team Heroes Play United. Heroes went on to win the 2011/2012 national title, the first time the team had won in 8 years. She also coached the team the following season. She went on to win another national title in Zambia's senior men's league in 2015/2016 as head coach of team Matero Magic. Whilst coaching in Zambia, Mills was also named as head coach for the Zambian men's National University Team. This team competed in the 2012 CUCSA Zone VI University Games, finishing second and competed in All Africa University Games (FASU) later that year where the team finished third.

At the club level, Mills worked with the Rwandan division 1 men's club team Patriots BBC for the 2019 Basketball Africa League Qualifiers. She led the team to the East Division Qualification Title, with the team going undefeated in the two rounds of qualifiers. The team went on to compete in the 2021 Basketball Africa League.

Having served as assistant coach of the Zambia men's national team for the 2017 Afrobasket Zone VI qualifiers and Cameroon men's basketball teams for 2019 FIBA World Cup African Qualifiers, Mills joined the Kenyan Morans as head coach in January 2021. She steered Kenya to qualifying for their first AfroBasket championship in 28 years, after beating 11-time African champions Angola 74-73 in Cameroon in February 2021 at the 2021 FIBA AfroBasket Qualifiers. Previously Kenya had never beaten Angola. As head coach of the Morans at the 2021 FIBA Afrobasket Mills led Kenya to a 1-3 record. Kenya defeated Mali to pick up their first win at an AfroBasket and for the first time progressed past the first round group stage.

=== Basketball Africa League (2022–present) ===
On 12 February 2022, she was announced as head coach of AS Salé a club in the Division Excellence, the top professional men's league in Morocco. Mills was the first female head coach of men's team in Morocco and the Arab world, In March 2022, Mills became the first female head coach of a men's team in the Basketball Africa League. She left the team in May to pursue coaching opportunities with national teams in Africa. On 4 September 2023 Coach Mills was named as the head coach of Bangui Sporting Club for the upcoming 2024 Road to BAL. Road to BAL are the qualifiers for the 2024 Basketball Africa League.

On 2 December 2022, Mills signed for Ivorian team ABC Fighters, who earlier qualified for the 2023 BAL season. In their first appearance in the BAL, Mills lead the team to the playoffs, where they fell to Angolan club team Petro de Luanda in the quarter finals.

On 4 September 2023 Mills was announced as the head coach of Central African Republic club team Bangui Sporting Club for the upcoming 2024 Road to BAL. The Road to BAL is the qualifiers for the 2024 BAL season. On 5 November, Bangui Sporting Club won the Road to BAL Western Conference Finals and qualified for the 2024 BAL season. Mills declined to re-sign with Bangui Sporting Club for the 2024 Basketball Africa League due to the non-payment of her salary and bonus for the second round of the 2023 Road to BAL.

== Personal ==
Mills grew up in Sydney with a passion for coaching basketball since an early age. She and her identical twin sister, Vik, grew up playing multiple sports such as netball, tennis, athletics and swimming. With Vik, she started playing basketball at the age of 15. They played club and representative basketball for Northern Suburbs Basketball Association at both the junior and senior level. Mills took her first basketball coaching position at age 16, on many occasions co-coaching with her sister Vik.

== Head coaching record ==
=== BAL ===
Legend
Regular season	G	Games coached	W	Games won	L	Games lost	W–L %	Win–loss %
Playoffs	PG	Playoff games	PW	Playoff wins	PL	Playoff losses	PW–L %	Playoff win–loss %

Team	Year	G	W	L	W–L%	Finish	PG	PW	PL	PW–L%	Result
AS Salé	2022	5	3	2	.600	3rd in Sahara Conference	1	0	1	.000	Lost in Quarterfinals
ABC Fighters	2023	5	3	2	.600	4th in Sahara Conference	1	0	1	.000	Lost in Quarterfinals

== Global Women In Basketball Coaching Network ==
In August 2022 Mills launched the Global Women In Basketball Coaching Network via Facebook. Co-founded with her twin sister Vic, the network is the first international network for female basketball coaches. The mission of the network is to connect female coaches from around the world on a platform where they can engage, empower, and elevate each other to success.
