= Ronnie Gundo =

Kenyan basketball player (born 1992)

No. 13 – CB Villarrobledo
- Position: Power forward
- League: LEB Plata

Personal information
- Born: 21 July 1992 (age 34) Nyakach, Kisumu County, Kenya
- Listed height: 2.03 m (6 ft 8 in)
- Listed weight: 240 lb (109 kg)

Career information
- High school: Maseno School (Nyanza Province)
- College: Canisius (2015–2017); Robert Morris (2017–2018)
- NBA draft: 2018: undrafted
- Playing career: 2019–present

Career history
- 2021–present: CB Villarrobledo
Medals
Men's basketball
Representing Kenya
Silver medal – second place	2019 AfroCan Bamako

Ronald Gundo Gombe (born 21 July 1992) is a Kenyan basketball player. He competed for Canisius College and Robert Morris University. He also represents the Kenya national basketball team. He is currently playing in Spain for Salou in the Spain - LEB Silver.

== Personal and early life ==
Ronnie Gundo hails from Nyakach, Kisumu County. He went to Gentiana Primary School in Riruta Satellite before he proceeded to Onjiko High School.

He grew up in the low income residential Kawangware area of Nairobi. He was introduced to basketball by a friend while at high school in Kenya in 2007. Shortly after, his mother Rael Gombe suffered a near-fatal stroke and became paralysed. That, coupled with the fact that Ronnie's father John Gombe was struggling to pay for his mother's medication and to take care of the family while also keeping Ronnie in school, made Ronnie pursue basketball passionately.

His efforts led to a sports a scholarship to join the prestigious Maseno School. With the school team, coached by Paul Otula, he reached the basketball semi-finals of the 2009 secondary schools national championships. There, Gundo's team lost to Ongata Rongai's Laiser Hill. In 2010, Maseno beat Laiser Hill in the national finals staged at Upper Hill High School to emerge as national champions. He was named the Most Valuable Player (MVP) in the national secondary school games in 2010. That same year, Ronnie Gundo was among basketball players selected to attend the youth sports camp in the US dubbed "Basketball without Borders." It was organised by the NBA.

He lost his father in 2010.

Gundo states that he counts other national team players Tylor Ongwae and Griffin Ligare as his friends.

Ronnie Gundo's nickname 'Gogi' (freight train) was first started by the Kenyan Moran's former head coach Cliff Owuor.

== College career ==
His college career started off at Valley Forge Military college in 2013 where he averaged 24 point sand 12 rebounds. He would go under the recruiting radar in his second year due eligibility issues that hindered him from playing. In 2015 he joined Canisius College. In his second season at Canisius, he suffered an injury that would see him undergo 2 surgeries to repair his tone abdominal muscle. He later graduated with a bachelor's degree in Finance and Accounting.

In 2017, he transferred to Robert Morris University where he graduated with a Master of Business Administration in 2018.

== National team ==
In 2011, he went for the Kenyan national team trials at Railway Club in Nairobi alongside Tylor Ongwae. Even though they both came uninvited, the head coach Cliff Owuor accepted them both into the team. Gundo's first full engagement with the 'Morans' started right after he finished secondary school.

Years later, he was called up to the Kenyan Morans again for the AfroCan 2019 tournament in Mali. There, Kenya finished second behind the Democratic Republic of Congo.

At the AfroBasket 2021 qualification, at the crucial game against Mozambique he was one of Kenya's standout performers in the Morans' 79–62 victory. 10.7 rebounds per game earned him the title of the best rebounder at the tournament. He went on to help the team qualify for the 2021 FIBA AfroBasket with the team defeating 11x AfroBasket Champions Angola.

Later, Ronnie Gundo helped Kenya qualify for the FIBA AfroBasket 2021, Kenya's first appearance at Africa's premier national basketball competition in 28 years.

== Player profile ==
Morans’ assistant coach Collins Gaya has praised Gundo's work ethic and leadership. In December 2020, Gaya stated about Gundo that “He is a pass-first player. He is excellent in playing defensive and rebounding.“

Kenya's former head coach Owino stated that Gundo is "extremely athletic, getting rebounds, blocking shots and scoring from the perimeter. His vertical leap and timing is superb.”
