= Randoald Dessarzin =

Randoald Dessarzin (born 1964) is a Swiss basketball coach, former head coach of the Cote d'Ivoire national basketball team.

Dessarzin spent the first nine years of his coaching career with Boncourt BC of the Swiss basketball league. He led the team to a top three finish in each of his last five seasons with the club prior to leaving the team in 2007. Following this, he joined French side JDA Dijon of the Ligue Nationale de Basketball.

Dessarzin is also the coach of the Cote d'Ivoire national basketball team. He coached the team for the first time at the FIBA Africa Championship 2009, guiding the team to a surprise silver medal and a berth at the 2010 FIBA World Championship.
