= Francis Kobangoye =

Gabonese basketball player

Manga Basket
- Position: Shooting guard
- League: D1 Gabon

Personal information
- Born: 4 November 1990 (age 36) Port-Gentil, Gabon
- Listed height: 6 ft 4 in (1.93 m)

Career information
- Playing career: 2008–present

Career history
- Manga Basket

Lin Francis Kobangoye Ikinda (born 4 November 1990) is a Gabonese professional basketball player. He currently plays for the Manga Basket club of the D1 Gabon league.

He represented Gabon's national basketball team at the 2015 AfroBasket, where he played most minutes for his team.
