= 2023 FIBA AfroCan =

African men's basketball competition

Tournament details
- Host country: Angola
- City: Luanda
- Dates: 8–16 July 2023
- Teams: 12
- Venue: 1 (in 1 host city)

Final positions
- Champions: Morocco (1st title)
- Runners-up: Ivory Coast
- Third place: Rwanda
- Fourth place: DR Congo

Tournament statistics
- MVP: (Morocco) Kevin Franceschi
- Top scorer: (Democratic Republic of the Congo) Evariste Shonganya (19.8 points per game)

Official website
- Link

The 2023 FIBA AfroCan was the 2nd edition of the FIBA AfroCan. The tournament was held from 8 July to 16 July 2023 and was hosted in Angola. DR Congo are the defending champions, having won the 2019 title. The second tournament was supposed to be held in 2021, but was cancelled due to the COVID-19 pandemic.

Morocco won their first AfroCan title after defeating Ivory Coast in the final.

== Qualification ==
The four highest ranked teams from the AfroCan 2019 were automatically qualified. Eight other teams qualified through the qualification rounds, which are held from February to June 2023. Nigeria received the only wild card for the tournament.

Qualification method	Dates	Host city	Qualified teams
Best four teams from AfroCan 2019	Bamako		DR Congo; Kenya; Angola; Morocco
Zone 1	23–25 June	Algiers	Tunisia
Zone 2 and 3	30 June – 2 July	Abidjan	Ivory Coast
Zone 4	19–25 March 2023	Yaoundé	Cameroon; Gabon
Zone 5	17–21 June 2023	Dar es Salaam	Rwanda
Zone 6	21–28 February 2023	Bulawayo	Mozambique
Zone 7	Not held		
Wild card	-	–	Nigeria

== Draw ==
The draw was held on 10 June in Maputo, Mozambique. At the time, eight out of twelve teams were known, with four still having to qualify.

== Group phase ==
=== Group A ===
Pos	Team	Pld	W	L	PF	PA	PD	Pts	Qualification
1	Kenya	2	1	1	125	118	+7	3	Advance to quarter-finals
2	Ivory Coast	2	1	1	118	114	+4	3	Advance to qualification games for quarter-finals
3	Gabon	2	1	1	118	129	−11	3	Advance to qualification games for quarter-finals

Updated to match(es) played on unknown. Source: FIBA
Rules for classification: 1) Points; 2) Head-to-head points; 3) Head-to-head point difference; 4) Head-to-head points scored; 5) Point difference.

=== Group B ===
Pos	Team	Pld	W	L	PF	PA	PD	Pts	Qualification
1	Angola (H)	2	2	0	129	103	+26	4	Advance to quarter-finals
2	Nigeria	2	1	1	110	113	−3	3	Advance to qualification games for quarter-finals
3	Mali	2	0	2	111	134	−23	2	Advance to qualification games for quarter-finals

Updated to match(es) played on unknown. Source: FIBA
Rules for classification: 1) Points; 2) Head-to-head points; 3) Head-to-head point difference; 4) Head-to-head points scored; 5) Point difference.
(H) Hosts

=== Group C ===
Pos	Team	Pld	W	L	PF	PA	PD	Pts	Qualification
1	Tunisia	2	2	0	134	113	+21	4	Advance to quarter-finals
2	Morocco	2	1	1	111	125	−14	3	Advance to qualification games for quarter-finals
3	Rwanda	2	0	2	119	126	−7	2	Advance to qualification games for quarter-finals

Updated to match(es) played on unknown. Source: FIBA
Rules for classification: 1) Points; 2) Head-to-head points; 3) Head-to-head point difference; 4) Head-to-head points scored; 5) Point difference.

=== Group D ===
Pos	Team	Pld	W	L	PF	PA	PD	Pts	Qualification
1	DR Congo	2	2	0	147	121	+26	4	Advance to quarter-finals
2	Mozambique	2	1	1	129	142	−13	3	Advance to qualification games for quarter-finals
3	Cameroon	2	0	2	128	141	−13	2	Advance to qualification games for quarter-finals

Updated to match(es) played on unknown. Source: FIBA
Rules for classification: 1) Points; 2) Head-to-head points; 3) Head-to-head point difference; 4) Head-to-head points scored; 5) Point difference.

== Final phase ==
Qualification to quarter-finals
Morocco	78
Cameroon	50
Nigeria	71
Gabon	55
Mozambique	62
Rwanda	73
Ivory Coast	72
Mali	58

Quarter-finals
Kenya	46
Morocco	55
DR Congo	74
Nigeria	72
Angola	63
Rwanda	73
Tunisia	66
Ivory Coast	69

Semi-finals
Morocco	76
DR Congo	69
Rwanda	71
Ivory Coast	74

Final
Morocco	78
Ivory Coast	76
Third place
DR Congo	73
Rwanda	82

5–8th place

5–8th place semifinals
Kenya	61
Nigeria	59
Angola	65
Tunisia	68

Fifth place
Kenya	59
Tunisia	67
Seventh place
Nigeria	69
Angola	72

== Final standing ==
Rank	Team	Record
1st place, gold medalist(s)	Morocco	5-1
2nd place, silver medalist(s)	Ivory Coast	4-2
3rd place, bronze medalist(s)	Rwanda	3-3
4	DR Congo	3-2
5	Tunisia	4–1
6	Kenya	2–2
7	Angola	3–3
8	Nigeria	3–3
9	Gabon	1–2
10	Mozambique	1–2
11	Cameroon	0–3
12	Mali	0–3

=== Awards ===
The awards were announced after the final.

All-Star Team
Guards	Forwards	Center
(Morocco) Jihad Benchlikha (Morocco) Kevin Franceschi	(Democratic Republic of the Congo) Evariste Shonganya (Rwanda) Dieudonné Ndizeye	(Ivory Coast) Mike Fofana
MVP: (Morocco) Kevin Franceschi

== See also ==
- Official Website
