= FIBA Africa Championship 1993 =

Tournament details
- Host country: Kenya
- City: Nairobi
- Dates: 18–28 September
- Teams: 9
- Venue: 1 (in 1 host city)

Final positions
- Champions: Angola (3rd title)
- Runners-up: Egypt
- Third place: Senegal
- Fourth place: Kenya

Tournament statistics
- MVP: (Senegal) Etienne Preira

The FIBA Africa Championship 1993 was hosted by Kenya from September 18 to September 28, 1993. The games were played in Nairobi. The top two countries in this FIBA Africa Championship earned the two berths allocated to Africa for the 1994 FIBA World Championship in Canada. Angola won the tournament, the country's 3rd consecutive African championship, by beating Egypt in the final.

== Competing nations ==
The following national teams competed:

Group A	Group B
Algeria; Kenya; Mali; Senegal	Angola; Ivory Coast; Egypt; Gabon; Tunisia

== Preliminary rounds ==
=== Group A ===
Team	Pts	Pld	W	L	PF	PA	Diff
Senegal	6	3	3	0	253	183	+70
Kenya	4	3	1	2	208	219	-11
Algeria	4	3	1	2	195	236	-41
Mali	4	3	1	2	209	227	-18

Day 1

Kenya	80–50	Algeria
Senegal	91–58	Kenya

Day 2

Algeria	86–65	Mali
Senegal	71–66	Mali

Day 3

Mali	78–70	Kenya
Senegal	91–59	Algeria

=== Group B ===
Team	Pts	Pld	W	L	PF	PA	Diff
Egypt	8	4	4	0	373	314	+59
Angola	7	4	3	1	362	254	+108
Ivory Coast	6	4	2	2	309	319	-10
Tunisia	5	4	1	3	342	379	-37
Gabon	4	4	0	4	255	375	-120

Day 1

Egypt	104–81	Gabon
Ivory Coast	93–92	Tunisia

Day 2

Ivory Coast	53–78	Angola
Gabon	62–92	Tunisia

Day 3

Tunisia	86–103	Egypt
Angola	84–47	Gabon

Day 4

Ivory Coast	95–65	Gabon
Angola	79–82	Egypt

Day 5

Angola	121–72	Tunisia
Egypt	84–68	Ivory Coast

== Knockout stage ==
Semi-finals
September 27, 1993
Angola	91
Senegal	80
September 27, 1993
Egypt	79
Kenya	56

Final
September 28, 1993
Angola	69
Egypt	61
Third place
September 28, 1993
Senegal	90
Kenya	76

== Classification Stage ==
Mali	72–68	Tunisia
Ivory Coast	0–2	Algeria

== Final standings ==
Rank	Team	Record
1	Angola	5-1
2	Egypt	5-1
3	Senegal	4-1
4	Kenya	1-4
5	Algeria	2-2
6	Ivory Coast	2-3
7	Mali	2-2
8	Tunisia	1-4
9	Gabon	0-4

Angola and Egypt qualified for the 1994 FIBA World Championship in Canada.

== Awards ==
1993 FIBA Africa Championship winners

Angola
Third title

Most Valuable Player
(Senegal) Etienne Preira
