= Thérence Mayimba =

Gabonese basketball player

Personal information
- Born: May 10, 1995 (age 31) Libreville, Gabon
- Listed height: 6 ft 7 in (2.01 m)
- Listed weight: 199 lb (90 kg)

Career information
- High school: Montrose Christian (Rockville, Maryland); St. James School (Hagerstown, Maryland)
- College: George Mason (2014–2015)
- Position: Forward
- Number: 23

Gyll Thérence Mayimba (born March 10, 1995) is a Gabonese and French professional basketball player who currently plays for AOSM basketball club in France. He represents Gabon in international competition.

== High school career ==
Mayimba moved to the United States in 2011. He played his sophomore and junior seasons at Montrose Christian School in Rockville, Maryland under head coach Stu Vetter and averaged 8.9 points in the latter year. Following Vetter's resignation at Montrose Christian, Mayimba transferred to St. James School in Hagerstown, Maryland to play his final season in 2013. While completing high school, he was approached by several NCAA Division I college basketball programs such as George Washington, Delaware, Rhode Island, UAB and more. However, he chose to play for George Mason. Mayimba said, "The location is cool, being able to stay in the DMV. The coaching staff really showed me that I was important to them, and I like the guys on the team. They also have the majors that I want. The business department is strong and they have a music major, too." He was a three-star recruit, according to ESPN, and the 9th best prospect in the state.

== Collegiate career ==
Entering college, Mayimba saw ineligibility issues with the National Collegiate Athletic Association (NCAA) Eligibility Center. He was not allowed to play in his freshman season due to problems with his foreign transcript. Mayimba attended Junior College at Northwest Florida State College in Niceville, Florida where he averaged 8.0 ppg and 3.3 rpg. He helped NWFSC to a 27–6 record, a conference championship, and a final four appearance in the NJCAA Tournament.

== International career ==
On June 11, 2015, Gabon national basketball team head coach Thierry Bouanga announced that Mayimba would be part of the team's 21-man preliminary squad for AfroBasket 2015.
