= Gabon men's national basketball team =

Gabon
- FIBA ranking: 133 ▼4 (1 September 2026)
- Joined FIBA: 1965
- FIBA zone: FIBA Africa
- National federation: Gabon Basketball Federation
- Coach: Thierry Bouanga
- Nickname(s): Les Panthères (Panthers)

Olympic Games
- Appearances: None

FIBA World Cup
- Appearances: None

FIBA Africa Championship
- Appearances: 3
- Medals: None
Home	Away

The Gabon men's national basketball team (French: Équipe nationale de basket-ball du Gabon) representing Gabon in men's international basketball competitions, It is administered by the Gabon Basketball Federation.

At the AfroBasket 2015, Gabon finished 8th, its best placement ever.

== Competitive record ==
=== AfroBasket ===
Gabon has participated at the AfroBasket (previously the FIBA Africa Championship) three times, its best result being the quarter-finals in 2015.

AfroBasket record						Qualification record			
Year	Round	Position	GP	W	L	GP	W	L	–
(Morocco) 1968	Did not qualify								
(Egypt) 1970	Did not qualify								
(Senegal) 1972	Did not qualify								
(Central African Republic) 1974	Did not qualify								
(Egypt) 1975	Did not qualify								
(Senegal) 1978	Did not qualify								
(Morocco) 1980	Did not qualify								
(Somalia) 1981	Did not qualify								
(Egypt) 1983	Did not qualify								
(Ivory Coast) 1985	Did not qualify								
(Tunisia) 1987	Did not qualify								
(Angola) 1989	Did not qualify								
(Egypt) 1992	Did not qualify								
(Kenya) 1993	Preliminary round	9th	4	0	4				
(Algeria) 1995	Did not qualify								
(Senegal) 1997	Did not qualify								
(Angola) 1999	Did not qualify								
(Morocco) 2001	Did not qualify								
(Egypt) 2003	Did not qualify								
(Algeria) 2005	Preliminary round	9th	7	3	4				
(Angola) 2007	Did not qualify								
(Libya) 2009	Did not qualify					Did not enter			
(Madagascar) 2011	Did not qualify					Did not enter			
(Ivory Coast) 2013	Did not qualify					Did not enter			
(Tunisia) 2015	Quarter-finalist	8th	7	1	6	4	3	1	2015
(Tunisia) (Senegal) 2017	Did not qualify					4	0	4	2017
(Rwanda) 2021	Did not qualify					4	0	4	2021
(Angola) 2025	Did not qualify					6	0	6	2025

=== AfroCan ===
AfroBasket record
Year	Round	Position	GP	W	L
(Mali) 2019	Did not qualify				
(Angola) 2023	9th place	9th	3	1	2
(Rwanda) 2027	To be determined				

=== African Games ===
Basketball was part of the African Games until 2015. Later, it was replaced by the 3x3 version.

- 1973-2011 : Did not qualify
- 2015 : 8th

== Current squad ==
Gabon team for the AfroBasket 2017 qualification.

Gabon men's national basketball team roster
Players
Coaches

Pos.	No.	Name	Age – Date of birth	Height	Club
G/F	4	Tonny Boussougou Ibrahim	26 – 30 April 1990		7.0 Owendo	(Gabon)
PG	5	Christ Ndikuedi	22 – 1 March 1995
F	6	Dean Bezazouma	28 – 22 November 1988		Espoir BC	(Rwanda)
PF	7	Lerry Essono	25 – 11 March 1992	1.99 m (6 ft 6 in)	IRB BBA	(Algeria)
F	8	Jeriel Breel Dinga Igana	19 – 4 November 1997		70 SNI
F	9	Sylvere Abessolo	33 – 1 October 1983	1.94 m (6 ft 4 in)	Tali Somo B Libreville	(Gabon)
G	10	Francis Kobangoye	26 – 4 November 1990	1.92 m (6 ft 4 in)	Libreville Ezobe Dragons	(Gabon)
G/F	11	Marien Stephane Ellang	28 – 3 February 1989		Manga BB	(Gabon)
G/F	12	Gildas Ekouaghe	30 – 23 January 1987		CAS 1987	(Gabon)
G	13	Jean Eude Enguena Oworce	34 – 5 August 1982
F	14	Channick Nkoma	19 – 27 December 1997	2.03 m (6 ft 8 in)	Harcum College	(United States)
C	15	Adam Obangome	18 – 26 May 1998	2.05 m (6 ft 9 in)	Ezanga Team	(Gabon)

Legend

- Club – describes last
  club before the tournament
- Age – describes age
  on 26 March 2017

=== Depth chart ===
Pos.	Starting 5	Bench 1	Bench 2
C	Channick Nkoma	Adam Obangome
PF	Lerry Essono	Dean Bezazouma
SF	Sylvere Abessolo	Tonny Boussougou Ibrahim	Jeriel Breel Dinga Igana
SG	Francis Kobangoye	Marien Stephane Ellang	Gildas Ekouaghe
PG	Christ Ndikuedi	Jean Eude Enguena Oworce

== Kit ==
=== Manufacturer ===
2015: Erima

== Past squads ==
Gabon team for the AfroBasket 2015.

Gabon men's national basketball team - AfroBasket 2015 roster
Players
Coaches

Pos.	No.	Name	Age – Date of birth	Height	Club
G	4	Steeve Ndong	27 – 20 December 1987	1.76 m (5 ft 9 in)	Manga	(Gabon)
SF	5	Rodrigue Atsu	22 – 5 November 1992	1.82 m (6 ft 0 in)	Manga	(Gabon)
F	6	Thérence Mayimba	20 – 10 March 1995	2.01 m (6 ft 7 in)	George Mason	(United States)
PF	7	Lerry Essono	23 – 11 March 1992	1.99 m (6 ft 6 in)	IRB BBA	(Algeria)
PG	8	Cabrel Boundou	32 – 11 November 1982	1.85 m (6 ft 1 in)	Stade Mandji	(Gabon)
F	9	Sylvere Abessolo	31 – 1 October 1983	1.94 m (6 ft 4 in)	Somo	(Gabon)
G	10	Francis Kobangoye	24 – 4 November 1990	1.92 m (6 ft 4 in)	Tali	(Gabon)
SF	11	Marvin Mapaga	22 – 28 February 1993	1.98 m (6 ft 6 in)	Hope	(Gabon)
C	12	Jason Reteno	37 – 8 October 1977	2.03 m (6 ft 8 in)	Tali	(Gabon)
C	13	Stéphane Lasme	32 – 17 December 1982	2.03 m (6 ft 8 in)	Galatasaray	(Turkey)
C	14	Freddy Obame	29 – 6 April 1986	1.98 m (6 ft 6 in)	AS Estuaire	(Gabon)
G	15	Lionel Fabre	30 – 21 March 1985	1.88 m (6 ft 2 in)	Tali	(Gabon)

Head coach

- (Gabon) Thierry Bouanga

Assistant coach(es)

- (Serbia) Miodrag Marjanovic
- Michael Oganda Igoue

Legend

- Club – describes last
  club before the tournament
- Age – describes age
  on 30 August 2015

== See also ==
- Gabon men's national under-18 basketball team
- Gabon men's national under-16 basketball team
- Gabon women's national basketball team
- Stéphane Lasme
- Chris Silva
