= Lycée Romain Rolland (Goussainville, Val-d'Oise) =

School in Goussainville, France

Lycée Romain Rolland is a senior high school in Goussainville, Val-d'Oise, France, in the Paris metropolitan area.
