= Ivory Coast men's national basketball team =

Côte d'Ivoire
- FIBA ranking: 37 ▲1 (13 July 2026)
- Joined FIBA: 1961
- FIBA zone: FIBA Africa
- National federation: Fédération Ivoirienne de Basket-Ball
- Coach: Miguel Ángel Hoyo
- Nickname(s): Les Éléphants (The Elephants)

FIBA World Cup
- Appearances: 5

AfroBasket
- Appearances: 25
- Medals: Gold (1981, 1985); Silver (1978, 1980, 2009, 2021)

AfroCan
- Appearances: 2
- Medals: (silver) Silver (2023)
Home	Away

The Ivory Coast men's national basketball team is the men's basketball side that represents Ivory Coast in international competition. The team competes regularly in the African Championship and is administered by the Fédération Ivoirienne de Basket-Ball.

With two AfroBasket titles and six overall finals appearances, the country is traditionally home to one of the continent's finest basketball national teams. The Elephants have played at the FIBA Basketball World Cup five times and also played in the 2023 edition.

== History ==
=== Early AfroBasket Success (1968–1985) ===
After a 5th place finish at the FIBA Africa Championship 1968 in Morocco, the Ivory Coast national basketball team rose to prominence in the late 1970s and 1980s.

Côte d’Ivoire reached the final of the FIBA Africa Championship in 1978 and 1980, finishing as runners-up to Senegal on both occasions.

==== First AfroBasket titles ====
In 1981, Côte d’Ivoire captured their first continental title, defeating the Egypt in the championship game. Four years later, while hosting the 1985 AfroBasket in Abidjan, they claimed a second title after beating the Angola.

=== Return to the World Stage (2009–2019) ===
==== AfroBasket 2009 silver ====
After years outside of the spotlight, Côte d’Ivoire finished second at AfroBasket 2009, their first podium finish since 1985.

==== 2010 FIBA World Championship ====
The result qualified the team for the 2010 FIBA World Championship, their first FIBA Basketball World Cup appearance since 1986. Côte d’Ivoire finished with a 1–4 record, but celebrated a historic milestone by defeating the Puerto Rico 88–76 in their final group game — the nation’s first-ever World Cup victory.

=== Dramatic Qualification for 2019 World Cup ===
In the final round of African qualifiers, Côte d’Ivoire needed to win their last three games by a combined margin of 66 points in order to qualify as the best-ranked third-placed team. Against the odds, they surpassed that mark with a total margin of 73 points.

A decisive moment came in their 72–46 victory over the Nigeria, one of Africa’s strongest squads. Combined with a loss for the Central African Republic, Côte d’Ivoire clinched qualification ahead of Cameroon.

=== 2019 World Cup Campaign ===
At the 2019 FIBA Basketball World Cup, Côte d’Ivoire competed in Group A alongside China, Poland and Venezuela.

=== Later years (2020–present) ===
==== AfroBasket Resurgence and Near Miss (2021) ====
Côte d’Ivoire advanced to the AfroBasket 2021 final held in Rwanda, marking the first time they reached the championship game since AfroBasket 2009. In the semi-finals, they defeated the Senegal 75–65, powered by a dominant double-double from Matt Costello (17 points, 12 rebounds), contributions from Vafessa Fofana and Nisre Mimi Zouzoua, and a strong bench performance by Souleyman Diabaté scoring 14 points.

In the final, Côte d’Ivoire narrowly lost to the Tunisia 78–75, as Tunisia retained their title. Souleyman Diabaté was a standout for the Ivorians, scoring a game-high 22 points.

==== 2025 AfroBasket Campaign: Qualifying Dominance ====
Côte d’Ivoire entered the AfroBasket 2025 qualifiers with authority, posting a perfect 6–0 record. Notable victories against the Egypt in Cairo and Madagascar demonstrated their preparation and ambition.

In the main tournament scheduled for August 2025 in Angola, Côte d’Ivoire competes in the group phase with fixtures against Rwanda, Cape Verde, and DR Congo.

== Competitive record ==
=== FIBA World Cup ===
FIBA World Cup record						Qualification record		
Year	Round	Position	GP	W	L	GP	W	L
(Brazil) 1963	did not qualify					AfroBasket served as qualification		
(Uruguay) 1967	did not qualify					AfroBasket served as qualification		
(Socialist Federal Republic of Yugoslavia) 1970	did not qualify					AfroBasket served as qualification		
(Puerto Rico) 1974	did not qualify					AfroBasket served as qualification		
(Philippines) 1978	did not qualify					AfroBasket served as qualification		
(Colombia) 1982	Classification round	13th	7	0	7	AfroBasket served as qualification		
(Spain) 1986	Preliminary round	23rd	5	0	5	AfroBasket served as qualification		
(Argentina) 1990	did not qualify					AfroBasket served as qualification		
(Canada) 1994	did not qualify					AfroBasket served as qualification		
(Greece) 1998	did not qualify					AfroBasket served as qualification		
(United States) 2002	did not qualify					AfroBasket served as qualification		
(Japan) 2006	did not qualify					AfroBasket served as qualification		
(Turkey) 2010	Preliminary round	21st	5	1	4	AfroBasket served as qualification		
(Spain) 2014	did not qualify					AfroBasket served as qualification		
(China) 2019	Classification round	29th	5	0	5	12	7	5
(Philippines) (Japan) (Indonesia) 2023	Classification round	27th	5	1	4	12	10	2
(Qatar) 2027	To be determined					In progress		
(France) 2031	To be determined					To be determined		
Total	5/18		27	2	25	24	17	7

=== FIBA Africa Championship ===
Champions Runners-up Third place Fourth place

Year	Round	Position	GP	W	L
(United Arab Republic) 1962	did not enter				
(Morocco) 1964	did not enter				
(Tunisia) 1965	did not enter				
(Morocco) 1968	Seventh place	7th	7	4	3
(Egypt) 1970	did not qualify				
(Senegal) 1972	Tenth place	10th	6	1	5
(Central African Republic) 1974	did not qualify				
(Egypt) 1975	did not qualify				
(Senegal) 1978	Runners-up	2nd	6	4	2
(Morocco) 1980	Runners-up	2nd	7	5	2
(Somalia) 1981	Champions	1st	7	6	1
(Egypt) 1983	Fourth place	4th	6	3	3
(Ivory Coast) 1985	Champions	1st	7	6	1
(Tunisia) 1987	Classification stage	7th	5	2	3
(Angola) 1989	Classification stage	5th	7	4	3
(Egypt) 1992	Preliminary round	11th	5	1	4
(Kenya) 1993	Classification stage	6th	5	2	3
(Algeria) 1995	Classification stage	7th	5	3	2
(Senegal) 1997	Classification stage	8th	5	1	4
(Angola) 1999	Eight place	8th	6	2	4
(Morocco) 2001	Classification stage	8th	6	2	4
(Egypt) 2003	Eleventh place	11th	6	2	4
(Algeria) 2005	Classification stage	10th	7	3	4
(Angola) 2007	Quarterfinals	8th	6	2	4
(Libya) 2009	Runners-up	2nd	9	5	4
(Madagascar) 2011	Fourth place	4th	8	3	5
(Ivory Coast) 2013	Fourth place	4th	7	5	2
(Tunisia) 2015	Round of 16	12th	5	2	3
(Tunisia) (Senegal) 2017	Preliminary round	14th	3	0	3
(Rwanda) 2021	Runners-up	2nd	6	5	1
(Angola) 2025	Quarter-finals	7th	4	3	1
Total	25/31		151	76	75

=== FIBA AfroCan ===
Runners-up

Year	Round	Position	GP	W	L
(Mali) 2019	Tenth place	10th	3	0	3
(Angola) 2023	Runners-up	2nd	6	5	1
(Rwanda) 2027	Qualified				
Total			9	5	4

=== African Games ===
- 1978 – (silver)
- 1987 – (bronze)
- 2003 – 4th
- 2007 – 6th
- 2011 – 8th
- 2015 – 7th

== Team ==
=== Current roster ===
Team for the 2025 FIBA AfroBasket.

Côte d'Ivoire national basketball team roster
Players
Coaches

Pos.	No.	Name	Age – Date of birth	Height	Club	Ctr.
PG	0	Assemian Moulare	22 – 21 January 2003	1.87 m (6 ft 2 in)	JA Vichy Basket	(France)
PG	2	Bazoumana Koné	31 – 13 December 1993	1.96 m (6 ft 5 in)	Würzburg Baskets	(Germany)
SG	7	Maxence Dadiet	26 – 2 March 1999	1.92 m (6 ft 4 in)	Toulouse Basket Club	(France)
SG	8	Lionel Kouadio	23 – 1 September 2001	1.92 m (6 ft 4 in)	CB Morón	(Spain)
PG	10	Solo Diabate	38 – 21 July 1987	1.83 m (6 ft 0 in)	Atletico Petroleos	(Angola)
SF	12	Vafessa Fofana	33 – 12 June 1992	2.00 m (6 ft 7 in)	BCM Gravelines Dunkerque	(France)
PF	16	Bali Coulibaly	30 – 3 July 1995	2.01 m (6 ft 7 in)	Caen Basket Calvados	(France)
PF	21	Amadou Sidibe (C)	31 – 25 March 1994	1.83 m (6 ft 0 in)	Soproni KC	(Hungary)
C	22	Sydney Hawmmond	25 – 10 February 2000	2.13 m (7 ft 0 in)	Free agent
C	24	Matt Costello	32 – 5 August 1993	2.08 m (6 ft 10 in)	Valencia Basket	(Spain)
SG	25	Junior Ouattara	25 – 7 July 2000	1.93 m (6 ft 4 in)	Stade Toulousain Basketball	(France)
SF	77	Jean Philippe Dally	29 – 8 March 1996	2.01 m (6 ft 7 in)	JDA Dijon Basket	(France)

Head coach

- (Spain) Miguel Ángel Hoyo

Assistant coach(es)

- (Ivory Coast) Stéphane Konaté
- (Spain) Pablo Abuin

Legend

- (C) Team captain
- Club – describes last
  club before the tournament
- Age – describes age
  on 12 August 2025

=== Notable players ===
Other current notable players from Ivory Coast:

Ivory Coast roster
Players
Coaches

Pos.	No.	Name	Age – Date of birth	Height	Club	Ctr.
G		Pape-Philippe Amagou	32 – 27 February 1985	1.86 m (6 ft 1 in)	Le Mans Sarthe Basket	(France)
G/F		Guy Landry Edi	28 – 26 December 1988	2.02 m (6 ft 8 in)	Saint-Chamond Basket	(France)
F/C		Herve Lamizana	36 – 22 January 1981	2.08 m (6 ft 10 in)	Yulon Luxgen	(Taiwan)
PF		Herve Toure	35 – 25 February 1982	2.05 m (6 ft 9 in)	Estudiantes Concordia	(Argentina)
C		Louri Frejus Zerbo	28 – 2 April 1989	2.09 m (6 ft 10 in)	Limoges CSP Elite	(France)
C		Mohamed Bamba	19 – 12 May 1998	2.13 m (7 ft 0 in)	Orlando Magic	(United States)

Legend

- Club – describes current club
- Age – describes age on 8 June 2017

=== Past rosters ===
Roster for the 2023 FIBA Basketball World Cup.

Ivory Coast men's national basketball team – 2023 FIBA Basketball World Cup roster
Players
Coaches

Pos.	No.	Name	Age – Date of birth	Height	Club	Ctr.
PG	0	Assémian Moularé	20 – 21 January 2003	1.87 m (6 ft 2 in)	Vichy-Clermont	(France)
SF	1	Charles Abouo	33 – 4 November 1989	1.96 m (6 ft 5 in)	Le Portel	(France)
PG	2	Bazoumana Kone	29 – 13 December 1993	1.96 m (6 ft 5 in)	Karlsruhe Lions	(Germany)
PF	3	Amadou Sidibé	29 – 25 March 1994	1.83 m (6 ft 0 in)	Peñarol	(Uruguay)
SF	4	Patrick Tapé	25 – 8 June 1998	2.14 m (7 ft 0 in)	Caledonia Gladiators	(United Kingdom)
SG	7	Maxence Dadiet	24 – 2 March 1999	1.92 m (6 ft 4 in)	Toulouse	(France)
F	8	Mike Fofana	25 – 5 October 1997	2.06 m (6 ft 9 in)	ABC Fighters	(Ivory Coast)
PG	10	Solo Diabate	36 – 21 July 1987	1.83 m (6 ft 0 in)	Petro de Luanda	(Angola)
SF	12	Vafessa Fofana	31 – 12 June 1992	2.00 m (6 ft 7 in)	Gravelines-Dunkerque	(France)
C	23	Cédric Bah (C)	29 – 11 May 1994	2.00 m (6 ft 7 in)	Vichy-Clermont	(France)
SG	45	Nisre Zouzoua	27 – 16 July 1996	1.92 m (6 ft 4 in)	Aix Maurienne	(France)
SF	77	Jean-Philippe Dally	27 – 8 March 1996	2.01 m (6 ft 7 in)	Champagne Basket	(France)

Head coach

- (Slovenia) Dejan Prokić

Assistant coach(es)

- (Serbia) Miloš Gligorijević

Legend

- (C) Team captain
- Club – describes last
  club before the tournament
- Age – describes age
  on 25 August 2023

Team for the 2013 FIBA Africa Championship.

Ivory Coast national basketball team roster
Players
Coaches

Pos.	No.	Name	Age – Date of birth	Height	Club	Ctr.
F	4	Charles Abouo	23 – 4 November 1989	1.96 m (6 ft 5 in)	CB Peñas Huesca	(Spain)
G	5	Mouloukou Diabate	26 – 21 July 1987	1.82 m (6 ft 0 in)	SLUC Nancy Basket	(France)
F	6	Issife Soumahoro	24 – 31 October 1988	1.96 m (6 ft 5 in)	Strasbourg IG	(France)
G	7	Pape-Philippe Amagou	28 – 27 February 1985	1.85 m (6 ft 1 in)	Chorale Roanne Basket	(France)
G	8	Kinidinnin Konate	32 – 23 August 1980	1.88 m (6 ft 2 in)	Abidjan Basket Club	(Ivory Coast)
C	9	Hervé Lamizana	32 – 22 January 1981	2.07 m (6 ft 9 in)
F	10	Ismaël N'Diaye	31 – 20 April 1982	1.98 m (6 ft 6 in)	Basket-club Boncourt	(Switzerland)
G	11	Mickaël Toti	26 – 11 April 1987	1.81 m (5 ft 11 in)	Reims Champagne Basket	(France)
C	12	Jonathan Kale	27 – 18 October 1985	2.03 m (6 ft 8 in)	CB Coruña	(Spain)
C	13	Louri Zerbo	24 – 2 April 1989	2.05 m (6 ft 9 in)	BCM Gravelines	(France)
F	14	Guy Edi	24 – 26 December 1988	1.96 m (6 ft 5 in)	Gonzaga	(United States)
F	15	Mohamed Koné	32 – 24 March 1981	2.11 m (6 ft 11 in)	Chorale Roanne Basket	(France)

Head coach

- (Spain) Natxo Lezkano

Legend

- Club – describes last
  club before the tournament
- Age – describes age
  on 20 August 2013

=== Head coaches ===
- (Ivory Coast) Jean-Claude Kouadio – Late 1970s
- (Ivory Coast) Kouassi Germain (1981)
- (Socialist Federal Republic of Yugoslavia) Vladislav Lučić: (1981–1983)
- (Ivory Coast) Alphonse Bilé (1985)
- (Ivory Coast) Georges S. Bamba – 1980s
- (Ivory Coast) Tanguy E. Guel – 1990s
- (France) Gérard Sol – 2000–2006
- (France) Jacques Monclar: (2007)
- (Switzerland) Randoald Dessarzin: (2009, 2010)
- (France) Christophe Denis: (2012)
- (Spain) Natxo Lezkano: (2011, 2013, 2015, 2024)
- (Slovenia) Dejan Prokic (a.i.): (August 2022)
- (Spain) Miguel Ángel Hoyo: (2025)

== Kit ==
=== Manufacturer ===
Peak

== See also ==
- Ivory Coast national under-19 basketball team
- Ivory Coast national under-17 basketball team
- Ivory Coast women's national basketball team
- Ivory Coast national 3x3 team
