= Zimbabwe men's national basketball team =

Zimbabwe national basketball team

Zimbabwe
- FIBA ranking: 145 ▼2 (1 September 2026)
- Joined FIBA: 1962
- FIBA zone: FIBA Africa
- National federation: Basketball Union of Zimbabwe (BUZ)
- Coach: Emmanuel Mukandi
- Nickname: Triggers

Olympic Games
- Appearances: None
- Medals: None

FIBA World Cup
- Appearances: None
- Medals: None

African Championship
- Appearances: 2 (1981, 2015)
- Medals: None
Home	Away

The Zimbabwe national basketball team is the national basketball team representing Zimbabwe. It is administered by the Basketball Union of Zimbabwe (BUZ).

Squad Guards- Williams Goon (starter), Simba Mungomezi (starter), Tinotenda Mugabe, Moses Muyambo, Duncan Shenje, Tatenda Maturure Forwards- Eric Banda (starter)

Zimbabwe qualified for the African Basketball Championship twice.

== Competitions ==
=== Performance at Summer Olympics ===
yet to qualify

=== Performance at World championships ===
yet to qualify

=== Performance at FIBA Africa Championship ===
Year	Position	Tournament	Host
1981	11	FIBA Africa Championship 1981	Mogadishu, Somalia
2015	16	FIBA Africa Championship 2015	Radès, Tunisia

=== Performance at the All African Games ===
- 1985 - First round
- 1995 - First round
