= FIBA AfroCan 2019 =

2019 AfroCan

Tournament details
- Host country: Mali
- City: Bamako
- Dates: 19 – 28 July
- Teams: 12
- Venue(s): 1 (in 1 host city)

Final positions
- Champions: DR Congo (1st title)
- Runners-up: Kenya
- Third place: Angola
- Fourth place: Morocco

Tournament statistics
- MVP: (Democratic Republic of the Congo) Maxi Munanga Shamba
- Top scorer: (Kenya) Tylor Ongwae (21.7 points per game)

The 2019 FIBA AfroCan was the inaugural edition of the AfroCan, a men's basketball continental competition of Africa. Only players who play for Africa-based basketball clubs are eligible to participate. The tournament was hosted by Mali, from 19 to 28 July 2019.

DR Congo won the inaugural AfroCan title after defeating Kenya in the final.

== Venue ==
Bamako	FIBA AfroCan 2019 is located in Mali
Palais des Sports Salamatou Maïga	FIBA AfroCan 2019 is located in Mali
Capacity: 5,000	FIBA AfroCan 2019 is located in Mali

== Preliminary round ==
The draw of the FIBA AfroCan 2019 took place on 13 July in Praia, Cape Verde.

All times are local (UTC±0).

=== Group A ===
Pos	Team	Pld	W	L	PF	PA	PD	Pts	Qualification
1	Mali (H)	2	2	0	156	131	+25	4	Quarterfinals
2	Algeria	2	1	1	153	145	+8	3	Round of 16
3	Ivory Coast	2	0	2	138	171	−33	2	Round of 16

Source: FIBA
Rules for classification: 1) Points; 2) Head-to-head results; 3) Points difference; 4) Points scored.
(H) Hosts

19 July 2019

Boxscore

Algeria	85–75	Ivory Coast
Scoring by quarter: 23–13, 27–19, 17–20, 18–23
Pts: Bourkaib 14; Rebs: Guezout 7 Asts: Guezout 4		Pts: Karaboue 15; Rebs: Sevede 12; Asts: Sevede 6

Palais des Sports Salamatou Maiga, Bamako

20 July 2019

Boxscore

Mali	70–68	Algeria
Scoring by quarter: 13–16, 16–17, 11–22, –30-13
Pts: Djambo 16; Rebs: Kaba, Sidibe 8 Asts: Kante, Kaba 3		Pts: Hamdini 17; Rebs: Hamdini 6 Asts: Bourkaib, Hamdani 4

Palais des Sports Salamatou Maiga, Bamako

21 July 2019

Boxscore

Ivory Coast	63–86	Mali
Scoring by quarter: 12–22, 18–28, 21–22, 14–16
Pts: Karaboue 19; Rebs: Enan 11; Asts: three players 2		Pts: Diarouma 16; Rebs: Sidibe, Diarouma 5 Asts: Sanogo 6

Palais des Sports Salamatou Maiga, Bamako

=== Group B ===
Pos	Team	Pld	W	L	PF	PA	PD	Pts	Qualification
1	DR Congo	2	2	0	163	120	+43	4	Quarterfinals
2	Kenya	2	1	1	146	151	−5	3	Round of 16
3	Nigeria	2	0	2	124	162	−38	2	Round of 16

Source: FIBA
Rules for classification: 1) Points; 2) Head-to-head results; 3) Points difference; 4) Points scored.

19 July 2019

Boxscore

Nigeria	69–81	Kenya
Scoring by quarter: 19–16, 10–18, 23–19, 17–28

Palais des Sports Salamatou Maiga, Bamako

20 July 2019

Boxscore

Kenya	65–82	DR Congo
Scoring by quarter: 20–26, 16–17, 12–15, 17–24

Palais des Sports Salamatou Maiga, Bamako

21 July 2019

Boxscore

DR Congo	81–55	Nigeria
Scoring by quarter: 23–13, 15–14, 27–11, 16–17

Palais des Sports Salamatou Maiga, Bamako

=== Group C ===
Pos	Team	Pld	W	L	PF	PA	PD	Pts	Qualification
1	Angola	2	2	0	163	141	+22	4	Quarterfinals
2	Morocco	2	1	1	138	143	−5	3	Round of 16
3	Chad	2	0	2	158	175	−17	2	Round of 16

Source: FIBA
Rules for classification: 1) Points; 2) Head-to-head results; 3) Points difference; 4) Points scored.

19 July 2019

Boxscore

Chad	75–80	Morocco
Scoring by quarter: 17–14, 15–21, 25–21, 18–24

Palais des Sports Salamatou Maiga, Bamako

20 July 2019

Boxscore

Angola	95–83	Chad
Scoring by quarter: 16–17, 32–18, 32–23, 15–25

Palais des Sports Salamatou Maiga, Bamako

21 July 2019

Boxscore

Morocco	58–68	Angola
Scoring by quarter: 16–14, 13–23, 9–19, 20–12

Palais des Sports Salamatou Maiga, Bamako

=== Group D ===
Pos	Team	Pld	W	L	PF	PA	PD	Pts	Qualification
1	Tunisia	2	2	0	152	126	+26	4	Quarterfinals
2	Egypt	2	1	1	152	132	+20	3	Round of 16
3	Guinea	2	0	2	115	161	−46	2	Round of 16

Source: FIBA
Rules for classification: 1) Points; 2) Head-to-head results; 3) Points difference; 4) Points scored.

19 July 2019

Boxscore

Tunisia	77–58	Guinea
Scoring by quarter: 21–12, 17–11, 18–19, 21–16

Palais des Sports Salamatou Maiga, Bamako

20 July 2019

Boxscore

Guinea	57–84	Egypt
Scoring by quarter: 10–22, 13–24, 23–21, 11–17

Palais des Sports Salamatou Maiga, Bamako

21 July 2019

Boxscore

Egypt	68–75	Tunisia
Scoring by quarter: 18–17, 17–21, 14–22, 19–15

Palais des Sports Salamatou Maiga, Bamako

== Final round ==
=== Bracket ===
Round of 16
23 July
Morocco	86
Guinea	52
23 July
Kenya	85
Ivory Coast	83
23 July
Egypt	96
Chad (OT)	98
23 July
Algeria	84
Nigeria	80

Quarterfinals
24 July
Mali	61
Morocco	69
24 July
Tunisia	76
Kenya (OT)	82
24 July
DR Congo	67
Chad	60
24 July
Angola	89
Algeria	62

Semifinals
25 July
Morocco	66
Kenya	96
25 July
DR Congo	84
Angola	78

Final
27 July
Kenya	62
DR Congo	81
Third place
27 July
Morocco	71
Angola	88

5–8th place

5–8th place semifinals
25 July
Mali	64
Tunisia	60
25 July
Chad	80
Algeria	73

Fifth place
26 July
Mali	75
Chad	64
Seventh place
26 July
Tunisia	68
Algeria	67

== Final standing ==
Rank	Team	Record
1st place, gold medalist(s)	DR Congo	5–0
2nd place, silver medalist(s)	Kenya	4–2
3rd place, bronze medalist(s)	Angola	4–1
4	Morocco	3–3
5	Mali	4–1
6	Chad	2–4
7	Tunisia	3–2
8	Algeria	2–4
9	Egypt	1–2
10	Ivory Coast	0–3
11	Nigeria	0–3
12	Guinea	0–3

== Statistics and awards ==
=== Statistical leaders ===
==== Players ====
Points

Name	PPG
(Kenya) Tylor Ongwae	21.7
(Chad) Michael Koibe	19.2
(Guinea) Cedric Mansare	18.3
(Democratic Republic of the Congo) Maxi Munanga Shamba	18.3
(Democratic Republic of the Congo) Rolly Fula Nganga	17.0

Rebounds

Name	RPG
(Guinea) Bachir Diallo	9.3
(Angola) MMutau Fonseca	9.0
(Egypt) Haytham Khalifa	9.0
(Mali) Boubacar Sidibe	8.6
(Chad) Bienvenu Djimassal	8.2

Assists

Name	APG
(Democratic Republic of the Congo) Evariste Shonganya	5.8
(Democratic Republic of the Congo) Maxi Munanga	5.3
(Kenya) Tylor Ongwae	4.5
(Chad) Asnal Noubaramadje	4.3
(Algeria) Merouane Bourkaib	4.0

Blocks

Name	BPG
(Ivory Coast) Aboubakar Traore	2.0
(Chad) Bienvenu Djimassal	align=center 1.8
(Mali) Boubacar Sidibe	1.6
(Democratic Republic of the Congo) Evariste Shonganya	1.5
(Tunisia) Mohamed Debache	1.4

Steals

Name	SPG
(Nigeria) Micheal Afuwape	3.0
(Nigeria) Ibe Abuchi Agu	3.0
(Guinea) Bachir Diallo	3.0
(Chad) Michael Koibe	2.7
(Nigeria) Abdul Yahaya	2.7

Efficiency

Name	EFFPG
(Kenya) Tylor Ongwae	21.2
(Democratic Republic of the Congo) Maxi Munanga Shamba	20.3
(Democratic Republic of the Congo) Rolly Fula Nganga	19.8
(Democratic Republic of the Congo) Evariste Shonganya	18.0
(Egypt) Haytham Khalifa	17.3

==== Teams ====
Points

Team	PPG
Angola	85.0
Egypt	82.3
Kenya	78.3
DR Congo	78.0
Chad	76.7

=== Awards ===
The awards were announced after the final.

All-Star Team
Guards	Forwards	Center
(Democratic Republic of the Congo) Maxi Munanga Shamba (Kenya) Tylor Ongwae	(Angola) Edson Ndoniema (Democratic Republic of the Congo) Jordan Sakho	(Kenya) Tom Wamukota
MVP: (Democratic Republic of the Congo) Maxi Munanga Shamba
