= Kenya men's national basketball team =

Kenya
- FIBA ranking: 102 ▼2 (3 March 2026)
- Joined FIBA: 1965
- FIBA zone: FIBA Africa
- National federation: Kenya Basketball Association
- Coach: Cliff Owuor
- Nickname: Morans

FIBA World Cup
- Appearances: 0

AfroBasket
- Appearances: 4
Home	Away

Former logo of the Kenya Basketball Federation

Kenya national basketball team is the national men basketball team in Kenya. It is operated by the Kenya Basketball Federation (KBF).

Kenya hosted the 1993 FIBA Africa Championship where the team beat Algeria by an 80–50 blowout and progressed to the semi-final on a point differential, its best performance to date.

== History ==
Basketball in Kenya was started in Mang'u High School in the 1960s by the Marianist Brothers when Brother Frank Russell took over as Principal. He had previous experience in the USA as a sports master and basketball coach in several schools.

Kenya beat Africa's 11-time champion Angola 74–73 in the AfroBasket 2021 qualification in Yaoundé, Cameroon, hence booking a place at the African tournament for the first time since 1993.

In 2020, Kenya hired Australian Liz Mills as head coach, the first female coach in the Morans' history. She helped the team qualify for AfroBasket 2021, its first tournament in 18 years. Mills became the first female head coach to coach at an AfroBasket tournament.

In 2022, Kenya hired former national team coach Cliff Owuor for the 2023 FIBA World Cup Qualifiers. Under Owuor leadership the team went 0–6 in the first round of the qualifiers and failed to progress to the second round. Owuor will continue to lead the team for the 2023 FIBA AfoCan with the team automatically qualifying to the final round due to the team finishing runners up in the 2019 edition.

Kenya also has a u16 boys team and a u18 boys team that are also part of FIBA and the Olympic Committee. Kenyas u18 National Team is led by their team captain from Chicago, Illinois. His name is Iffi Kazmi, a 6’2 Guard that plays for Chi-Prep Sports Academy.

In July 2023 the team will compete in the 2023 AfroCAN tournament. They automatically qualified to the final stage by coming second in the 2019 edition but finished 6th in the final standings. The event was hosted in Angola.

== Competitions ==
=== FIBA Basketball World Cup ===
Year	Round	Position	GP	W	L
(Argentina) 1950	Not a FIBA member				
(Brazil) 1954	Not a FIBA member				
(Chile) 1959	Not a FIBA member				
(Brazil) 1963	Not a FIBA member				
(Uruguay) 1967	Did not qualify				
(Socialist Federal Republic of Yugoslavia) 1970	Did not qualify				
(Puerto Rico) 1974	Did not qualify				
(Philippines) 1978	Did not qualify				
(Colombia) 1982	Did not qualify				
(Spain) 1986	Did not qualify				
(Argentina) 1990	Did not qualify				
(Canada) 1994	Did not qualify				
(Greece) 1998	Did not qualify				
(United States) 2002	Did not qualify				
(Japan) 2006	Did not qualify				
(Turkey) 2010	Did not qualify				
(Spain) 2014	Did not qualify				
(China) 2019	Did not qualify				
(Philippines) / (Japan) / (Indonesia) 2023	Did not qualify				
(Qatar) 2027	Did not qualify				
(France) 2031	To be determined				
Total	0/21		9	0	9

=== AfroBasket ===
Fourth place

Year	Round	Position	GP	W	L
(Tunisia) 1965	Did not qualify				
(Morocco) 1968	Did not qualify				
(Egypt) 1970	Did not qualify				
(Senegal) 1972	Did not qualify				
(Central African Republic) 1974	Did not qualify				
(Egypt) 1975	Did not qualify				
(Senegal) 1978	Did not qualify				
(Morocco) 1980	Did not qualify				
(Somalia) 1981	Did not qualify				
(Egypt) 1983	Did not qualify				
(Ivory Coast) 1985	Classification round	12th	6	0	6
(Tunisia) 1987	Did not qualify				
(Angola) 1989	Preliminary round	11th	4	0	4
(Egypt) 1992	Did not qualify				
(Kenya) 1993	Fourth place	4th	5	1	4
(Algeria) 1995	Did not qualify				
(Senegal) 1997	Did not qualify				
(Angola) 1999	Did not qualify				
(Morocco) 2001	Did not qualify				
(Egypt) 2003	Did not qualify				
(Algeria) 2005	Did not qualify				
(Angola) 2007	Did not qualify				
(Libya) 2009	Did not qualify				
(Madagascar) 2011	Did not qualify				
(Ivory Coast) 2013	Did not qualify				
(Tunisia) 2015	Did not qualify				
(Tunisia) (Senegal) 2017	Did not qualify				
(Rwanda) 2021	Round of 16	9th	4	1	3
(Angola) 2025	Did not qualify				
Total	Fourth place	4th	19	2	17

=== African Games ===
- 1987 – 4th

=== FIBA AfroCan ===
Runners-up

Year	Round	Position	GP	W	L
(Mali) 2019	Runners-up	2nd	5	4	1
(Angola) 2023	6th place	6th	5	2	3
(Rwanda) 2027	To be determined				
Total	2/3	2nd	5	2	3

== Team ==
=== Current roster ===
Roster for the AfroBasket Qualifiers 2025.

Kenya men's national basketball team roster
Players
Coaches

Pos.	No.	Name	Age – Date of birth	Height	Club	Ctr.
PG	3	Iffi Kazmi	17 – 5 February 2006	1.89 m (6 ft 2 in)	Chicago Prep Sports Academy	(United States)
PG	5	Griffin Ligare	36 – 19 May 1985	1.75 m (5 ft 9 in)	Nairobi City Thunder	(Kenya)
SG	6	Erick Mutoro	29 – 29 May 1992	1.80 m (5 ft 11 in)	Ulinzi Warriors	(Kenya)
G	7	Victor Bosire	32 – 31 December 1988	1.75 m (5 ft 9 in)	Ulinzi Warriors	(Kenya)
PF	8	Fidel Okoth	24 – 24 October 1996	2.03 m (6 ft 8 in)	Strathmore University	(Kenya)
SF	9	Tylor Ongwae	30 – 15 July 1991	2.01 m (6 ft 7 in)	Bakken Bears	(Denmark)
SF	10	Albert Odero	24 – 21 June 1997	1.96 m (6 ft 5 in)	Arkansas Tech Wonder Boys	(United States)
SF	11	Valentine Nyakinda	29 – 16 March 1992	2.03 m (6 ft 8 in)	Kenya Ports Authority	(Kenya)
C	12	Desmond Owili	33 – 22 February 1988	2.08 m (6 ft 10 in)	Kilsyth Cobras	(Australia)
PF	13	Ronald Gombe	29 – 21 July 1992	2.03 m (6 ft 8 in)	CB Villarrobledo	(Spain)
C	14	Tom Wamukota	27 – 28 September 1993	2.13 m (7 ft 0 in)	Patriots BBC	(Rwanda)
PF	15	Okall Koranga	31 – 18 March 1990	2.03 m (6 ft 8 in)	Kampala International University	(Uganda)

Head coach

- (Australia) Liz Mills

Assistant coach(es)

- (Kenya) Collins Gaya

Legend

- Club – describes last
  club before the tournament
- Age – describes age
  on 24 August 2021

=== Depth chart ===
Pos.	Starting 5	Bench 1	Bench 2
C	Tom Wamukota	Desmond Owili
PF	Fidel Okoth	Okall Koranga	Ronald Gombe
SF	Albert Odero	Valentine Nyakinda
SG	Tylor Ongwae	Erick Mutoro
PG	Victor Bosire	Griffin Ligare	Situma Khaemba

=== Head coach position ===
- (Kenya) Ronnie Owino – 1993, 2001–02, 2007, 2010
- (Kenya) Francis Ngunjiri – 2013
- Cliff Owuor – 2020
- (Australia) Liz Mills – 2021

=== Past rosters ===
Team for the 2015 Afrobasket Qualification:

Kenya men's national basketball team roster
Players
Coaches

Pos.	No.	Name	Age – Date of birth	Height	Club
		Philip Otieno Ameny	–
		Situma Khaemba	–
		Ariel Okall Okoll Koranga	–
		Kevin Kigotho Macharia	–
		James Maina Mwangi	–
		Ali Salim Mzee	–
		Valentine Onyango Nyakinda	–
		Tobias Onyango Nyindha	–
		Victor Otieno Odendo	–
		James Kithinji	–
		David Amiani	–
		William Ochieng Otieno	–
		Allan Christopher Odongo Ouma	–
		Joseph Ouma	–
		Blacio Owuor Owili	–
		Ancetas Samuel Wafula	–
		Noel Yoni Were Wanambiro	–
		Griffin Ligare Wisyuba	–

Head coach

- (Kenya) Francis Ngunjiri

Legend

- Club – describes last
  club before the tournament
- Age – describes age
  on 19 August 2015

== See also ==
- Kenya national under-19 basketball team
- Kenya women's national basketball team
