= Basketball at the 2009 Mediterranean Games =

The basketball tournament at the 2009 Mediterranean Games was held in the Elettra Sports Hall, Ortona Sports Hall, Teramo Sports Hall and the Roseto Sports Hall from June 27 to July 4, 2009 in Pescara, Italy.

== Medalists ==
Event	Gold	Silver	Bronze
Men	Croatia	Greece	Turkey
Women	Italy	Serbia	Croatia

=== Medal count ===
Rank	Nation	Gold	Silver	Bronze	Total
1	Croatia (CRO)	1	0	1	2
2	Italy (ITA)	1	0	0	1
3	Greece (GRE)	0	1	0	1
3	Serbia (SRB)	0	1	0	1
5	Turkey (TUR)	0	0	1	1
Totals (5 entries)		2	2	2	6

== Men ==
=== Teams ===
Group A

- Croatia
- Greece
- Morocco
- Serbia

Group B

- Albania
- Italy
- Montenegro
- Turkey

=== Rosters ===
*(In parentheses is reported the year of birth)

Albania: Franko Bushati (85), Ardian Domi (84), Orion Garo (80), Andrea Gjinaj (86), Algert Gjonaj (87), Endrit Hysenagolli (88), Erkand Karaj (82), Arjonel Lame (84), Genti Lasku (85), Ersid Luca (81), Gerti Shima (86), Marlin Sukaj (83). Coach: Roland Avrami

Croatia: Lukša Andrić (85), Petar Babić (85), Marko Car (85), Jure Lalić (86), Drago Pašalić (84), Damir Rančić (83), Damjan Rudež (86), Krunoslav Simon (85), Rok Stipčević (86), Ante Tomić (87), Jakov Vladovic (83), Luka Žorić (84). Coach: Josip Vranković

Greece: Dimitrios Kalaitzidis (85), Dimitrios Karadolamis (87), Fanis Koumpouras (83), Alexis Kyritsis (82), Dimitrios Lolas (86), Dimitrios Mavroeidis (85), Igor Milošević (86), Petros Noeas (87), Nikos Papanikolaou (85), Gaios Skordilis (87), Stavros Toutziarakis (87), Ian Vougioukas (85). Coach: Ioannis Giannopoulos

Italy: Marco Allegretti (81), Pietro Aradori (88), Federico Bolzonella (84), Andrea Cinciarini (86), Daniele Cinciarini (83), Alessandro Cittadini (79), Andrea Crosariol (84), Luigi Datome (87), Lorenzo D'Ercole (88), Giuliano Maresca (81), Andrea Renzi (89), Tommaso Rinaldi (85). Coach: Carlo Recalcati

Montenegro: Filip Barović (90), Nikola Đoković (89), Nikola Ivanović (89), Stefan Knežević (89), Nikola Lalić (89), Miloš Lopičić (90), Slobodan Miljanić (90), Miloš Savović (89), Sead Šehović (89), Petar Stojanović (90), Milorad Sutulović (90), Nikola Vučević (90). Coach: Dejan Radonjić

Morocco: Yunss Akinocho (87), Zouheir Bourouis (83), Walid Dahmani (87), Zakaria El Masbahi (79), Mohamad Hachad (83), Mohammed Houari (77), Younes Idrissi (84), Mustapha Khalfi (80), Abderrahim Najah (84), Abdelmajid Naji (89), Sophian Rafai (86), Abdelhakim Zouita (86). Coach: Francis Jordan

Serbia: Stefan Birčević (89), Duško Bunić (89), Filip Čović (89), Branko Lazić (89), Vladimir Lučić (89), Nikola Maravić (89), Nikola Marković (89), Dragan Milosavljević (89), Aleksandar Mitrović (90), Nemanja Nedović (91), Stefan Stojačić (89), Bojan Subotić (90). Coach: Slobodan Klipa

Turkey: Mutlu Akpinar (83), Can Altıntığ (87), Engin Atsür (84), Yunus Çankaya (85), Mutlu Demir (87), Hakan Demirel (86), Sinan Güler (83), Barış Hersek (88), Cemal Nalga (87), Cihad Sahin (83), Fatih Solak (80), Erkan Veyseloğlu (83). Coach: Alaeddin Yakan

=== Preliminary round ===
==== Group A ====
	Team	Pts	Pl	W	L	PF	PA	PD
1.	Croatia	6	3	3	0	228	200	+28
2.	Greece	5	3	2	1	255	236	+19
3.	Serbia	4	3	1	2	216	228	–12
4.	Morocco	3	3	0	3	213	248	–35

- June 28, 2009

Greece	91 – 70	Serbia
Morocco	63 – 75	Croatia

- June 29, 2009

Croatia	82 – 68	Greece
Serbia	77 – 66	Morocco

- June 30, 2009

Greece	96 – 84	Morocco
Croatia	71 – 69	Serbia

==== Group B ====
	Team	Pts	Pl	W	L	PF	PA	PD
1.	Turkey	6	3	3	0	315	248	+67
2.	Italy	5	3	2	1	332	260	+72
3.	Montenegro	4	3	1	2	223	278	–55
4.	Albania	3	3	0	3	210	294	–84

- June 28, 2009

Turkey	98 – 61	Montenegro
Italy	106 – 69	Albania

- June 29, 2009

Montenegro	70 – 107	Italy
Albania	68 – 96	Turkey

- June 30, 2009

Albania	73 – 92	Montenegro
Turkey	121 – 119	Italy

=== Knockout stage ===
Final Standings
Rank	Team
1st place, gold medalist(s)	Croatia
2nd place, silver medalist(s)	Greece
3rd place, bronze medalist(s)	Turkey
4	Italy
5	Morocco
6	Albania
7	Montenegro
8	Serbia

==== 1st place bracket ====
Quarter-finals
July 1
Greece	85
Montenegro	67
July 1
Turkey	88
Morocco	67
July 1
Italy	75
Serbia	64
July 1
Croatia	94
Albania	70

Semi-finals
July 2
Greece	82
Turkey	79
July 2
Italy	104
Croatia	108

Final
July 4
Greece	60
Croatia	72
Third place
July 4
Turkey	88
Italy	71

==== 5th place bracket ====
Semi-finals
July 2
Montenegro	60
Morocco	81
July 2
Serbia	69
Albania	83

Fifth place
July 3
Morocco	108
Albania	67
Seventh place
July 3
Montenegro	68
Serbia	62

== Women ==
=== Teams ===
Group A

- Albania
- Croatia
- Italy

Group B

- Greece
- Malta
- Serbia
- Turkey

=== Preliminary round ===
==== Group A ====
	Team	Pts	Pl	W	L	PF	PA	PD
1.	Croatia	4	2	2	0	219	106	+113
2.	Italy	3	2	1	1	189	124	+65
3.	Albania	2	2	0	2	70	248	–178

- June 27, 2009

Croatia	130 – 35	Albania

- June 28, 2009

Italy	118 – 35	Albania

- June 29, 2009

Italy	71 – 89	Croatia

==== Group B ====
	Team	Pts	Pl	W	L	PF	PA	PD
1.	Greece	6	3	3	0	246	173	+73
2.	Serbia	5	3	2	1	215	169	+46
3.	Turkey	4	3	1	2	208	240	–32
4.	Malta	3	3	0	3	178	265	–87

- June 27, 2009

Greece	102 – 57	Malta
Turkey	64 – 80	Serbia

- June 28, 2009

Serbia	53 – 57	Greece
Malta	73 – 81	Turkey

- June 29, 2009

Greece	87 – 63	Turkey
Serbia	82 – 48	Malta

=== Knockout stage ===
Final Standings
Rank	Team
1st place, gold medalist(s)	Italy
2nd place, silver medalist(s)	Serbia
3rd place, bronze medalist(s)	Croatia
4	Greece
5	Turkey
6	Albania
7	Malta

==== 1st place bracket ====
Semi-finals
June 30
Croatia	71
Serbia	76
June 30
Greece	60
Italy	63

Final
July 2
Serbia	54
Italy	70
Third place
July 2
Croatia	77
Greece	62

==== 5th place bracket ====
Semi final		Fifth place
		Albania	60
Turkey	63	Turkey	89
Malta	43
