= 2014 FIBA Africa Clubs Champions Cup squads =

This article displays the rosters for the participating teams at the 2014 FIBA Africa Club Championship.

== (Ivory Coast) Abidjan Basket Club ==
Abidjan Basket Club – 2014 FIBA Africa Clubs Champions Cup – 11th place roster
Players							Coaches
Pos	#	Nat	Name	Height	Weight	Age	Head Coach
G	4	(Ivory Coast)	Alassane Meite	1.84 m (6 ft 1/2 in)		21 September 1991 (aged 23)	(Croatia) Igor Kovačević
G	5	(Ivory Coast)	Pierre Gbotto	1.83 m (6 ft 0 in)		18 August 1984 (aged 30)
	6	(Ivory Coast)	Jacques N'Guessan			14 March 1981 (aged 33)	Assistant coach(es)
	7	(Ivory Coast)	Kehasson Oulai	1.96 m (6 ft 5 in)		20 October 1995 (aged 19)	(Ivory Coast) Christian Coulibaly
G	8	(Ivory Coast)	Désiré Kone	1.87 m (6 ft 1 1/2 in)		19 November 1989 (aged 25)
F	9	(Ivory Coast)	Eric Affi	1.96 m (6 ft 5 in)		1 January 1982 (aged 32)
C	10	(Ivory Coast)	Kouamé Abo	2.00 m (6 ft 6 1/2 in)		26 October 1985 (aged 29)
	11	(United States)	Jamee Jackson	2.01 m (6 ft 7 in)	102 kg (225 lb)	24 June 1991 (aged 23)
	12	(United States)	Joseph Thompson			6 July 1991 (aged 23)
F	13	(Ivory Coast)	Blaise Amalabian	1.87 m (6 ft 1 1/2 in)		3 February 1974 (aged 40)
	14	(Ivory Coast)	Seguy Kraka			29 July 1985 (aged 29)
G	15	(Ivory Coast)	Stéphane Konaté	1.92 m (6 ft 3 1/2 in)	80 kg (180 lb)	23 August 1980 (aged 34)

== (Democratic Republic of the Congo) ASB Mazembe ==
ASB Mazembe – 2014 FIBA Africa Clubs Champions Cup – 7th place roster
Players							Coaches
Pos	#	Nat	Name	Height	Weight	Age	Head Coach
	5	(Democratic Republic of the Congo)	Johnny Mualaba			9 July 1988 (aged 26)	(Democratic Republic of the Congo) Simplice Tshibangu
	6	(Democratic Republic of the Congo)	Evariste Tolembo			6 April 1992 (aged 22)
	7	(Democratic Republic of the Congo)	Kabangu-Tshimbanga			18 September 1983 (aged 31)	Assistant coach(es)
	8	(Democratic Republic of the Congo)	Aubin Kasongo			10 October 1986 (aged 28)	(Democratic Republic of the Congo) Papy Kiembe
	9	(Republic of the Congo)	Bertrand Dibessa	1.95 m (6 ft 5 in)		6 March 1981 (aged 33)
	10	(Democratic Republic of the Congo)	Aluma Samuna			11 April 1994 (aged 20)
	11	(Democratic Republic of the Congo)	Tshibangu Katumbayi			27 September 1986 (aged 28)
	12	(Democratic Republic of the Congo)	Patient Lusuna			30 August 1985 (aged 29)
	13	(Democratic Republic of the Congo)	Mulamba-Mulamba			6 June 1988 (aged 26)
	14	(Democratic Republic of the Congo)	Prince Ngongo			4 December 1981 (aged 33)
	15	(Democratic Republic of the Congo)	Tshishimbi Sheba			9 February 1990 (aged 24)

== (France) Basket Club M'Tsapere ==
BC M'Tsapere – 2014 FIBA Africa Clubs Champions Cup – 8th place roster
Players							Coaches
Pos	#	Nat	Name	Height	Weight	Age	Head Coach
	4	(France)	Ouirdane M'Lardou			17 April 1979 (aged 35)	(France) Issoufali Papana
	5	(France)	Mouhamadi Maoulida			28 February 1991 (aged 23)
	6	(France)	Aboubacar Madi			6 June 1982 (aged 32)	Assistant coach(es)
	7	(France)	Pierre Rolland			25 February 1987 (aged 27)	Mohamed Daoud
	8	(France)	Ahamed Chebani			27 November 1989 (aged 25)
	9	(Switzerland)	Vladimir Buscaglia			4 July 1980 (aged 34)
	10	(France)	Kayeenda Chebani			1 March 1988 (aged 26)
C	11	(France)	Karim Kassim	1.99 m (6 ft 6 1/2 in)		9 April 1998 (aged 16)
	12	(France)	Moutawakilra Hamza			21 November 1985 (aged 29)
F	13	(Switzerland)	Oliver Vogt	1.98 m (6 ft 6 in)		28 March 1980 (aged 34)
	14	(France)	Richard Gaudin			23 March 1980 (aged 34)
	15	(France)	Samirdine Kamardine			4 May 1989 (aged 25)

== (Tunisia) Club Africain ==
Club Africain – 2014 FIBA Africa Clubs Champions Cup – Bronze medal roster
Players							Coaches
Pos	#	Nat	Name	Height	Weight	Age	Head Coach
	4	(Tunisia)	Youssef Mejri	2.04 m (6 ft 8 1/2 in)		13 August 1992 (aged 22)	(Tunisia) Monoom Aoun
	5	(Tunisia) (Germany)	Ziyed Chennoufi	2.02 m (6 ft 7 1/2 in)		29 November 1988 (aged 26)
	7	(Tunisia)	Mohamed Dhifallah	1.96 m (6 ft 5 in)		12 April 1982 (aged 32)	Assistant coach(es)
	8	(Tunisia)	Hichem Ez-Zahi			5 October 1981 (aged 33)	(Tunisia) Zouhair Ayechi
	9	(Tunisia)	Mohamed Hdidane	2.05 m (6 ft 8 1/2 in)		27 April 1986 (aged 28)
	10	(Tunisia)	Bechir Hadidane	2.01 m (6 ft 7 in)		18 August 1984 (aged 30)
	11	(Tunisia)	Lassaad Chouaya	1.90 m (6 ft 3 in)		22 August 1989 (aged 25)
G	12	(Tunisia)	Nizar Knioua	1.88 m (6 ft 2 in)	86 kg (190 lb)	8 June 1983 (aged 31)
C	13	(United States)	Marcus Haislip	2.08 m (6 ft 10 in)		22 December 1980 (aged 33)
G	14	(United States)	James Justice	1.75 m (5 ft 9 in)		12 January 1989 (aged 25)
	15	(Tunisia)	Mohamed Ghyaza	2.04 m (6 ft 8 1/2 in)		15 November 1986 (aged 28)

== (Tunisia) Étoile Sportive Radès ==
ES Radès – 2014 FIBA Africa Clubs Champions Cup – Silver medal roster
Players							Coaches
Pos	#	Nat	Name	Height	Weight	Age	Head Coach
	4	(Tunisia)	Omar Abada	1.89 m (6 ft 2 1/2 in)		20 April 1993 (aged 21)	(Cyprus) Pantelis Gavriel
	5	(Tunisia)	Amrou Bouallegue			24 December 1995 (aged 18)
G	6	(Tunisia) (France)	Marouan Kechrid	1.78 m (5 ft 10 in)	77 kg (170 lb)	2 June 1981 (aged 33)	Assistant coach(es)
	7	(Tunisia)	Mohamed Mouine			1 January 1986 (aged 28)	(Greece) Dimitris Varvouris
	8	(Tunisia)	Mohamed Hajri			3 December 1980 (aged 34)
	9	(United States)	Averon Mathews			30 June 1989 (aged 25)
	10	(Tunisia)	Zouhaier Snoussi			15 May 1981 (aged 33)
	11	(Tunisia)	Mohamed Maghrebi	1.96 m (6 ft 5 in)		31 July 1984 (aged 30)
	12	(United States)	Cheyne Gadson	1.93 m (6 ft 4 in)	90 kg (200 lb)	17 July 1980 (aged 34)
	13	(Tunisia)	Ahmed Smaali			26 June 1987 (aged 27)
	14	(Tunisia)	Farouk Bousalem			23 February 1990 (aged 24)
	15	(Tunisia)	Mohamed Abbassi			28 March 1991 (aged 23)

== (Equatorial Guinea) Malabo Kings ==
Malabo Kings – 2014 FIBA Africa Clubs Champions Cup – 10th place roster
Players							Coaches
Pos	#	Nat	Name	Height	Weight	Age	Head Coach
	4	(Equatorial Guinea)	Santiago Milam			1 January 19 (aged 1995)	(Spain) Hugo López
G	5	(Equatorial Guinea)	José E. Nchama			14 May 1994 (aged 20)
	6	(Equatorial Guinea) (Spain)	Richard Nguema	1.92 m (6 ft 3 1/2 in)		7 February 1988 (aged 26)	Assistant coach(es)
	7	(Equatorial Guinea)	Francisco Nzang			14 February 1989 (aged 25)	William Babiche
C	8	(United States) (Mali)	Mohamed Tangara	2.09 m (6 ft 10 1/2 in)	112 kg (247 lb)	11 August 1984 (aged 30)
	9	(Equatorial Guinea) (Spain)	Arturo Pascual			25 September 1980 (aged 34)
	10	(Cameroon)	Martin Obiang			5 June 1986 (aged 28)
	11	(Equatorial Guinea)	José O. Nchama			4 September 1985 (aged 29)
	12	(Equatorial Guinea)	Ricardo Obiang			17 October 1987 (aged 27)
C	14	(Mali)	Mamadou Diarra	2.13 m (7 ft 0 in)	108 kg (238 lb)	29 August 1986 (aged 28)
	15	(Equatorial Guinea)	Gordon Osa			9 January 1984 (aged 30)

== (Nigeria) Mark Mentors ==
Mark Mentors – 2014 FIBA Africa Clubs Champions Cup – 9th place roster
Players							Coaches
Pos	#	Nat	Name	Height	Weight	Age	Head Coach
	4	(Nigeria)	Musa Usman	1.92 m (6 ft 3 1/2 in)		27 September 1991 (aged 23)	(Nigeria) Peter Ahmedu
	5	(Nigeria)	Timothy Kwaor			25 April 1996 (aged 18)
	6	(Nigeria)	Aigbokhaode Daudu			13 January 1988 (aged 26)	Assistant coach(es)
	7	(Nigeria)	Ejike Ugboaja	2.03 m (6 ft 8 in)	102 kg (225 lb)	28 May 1985 (aged 29)	(Nigeria) Chris Okoh
	8	(Nigeria)	Azuoma Dike	1.88 m (6 ft 2 in)		7 December 1989 (aged 25)
	9	(Nigeria)	Akin Akintunde			18 March 1981 (aged 33)
	10	(Nigeria)	Chiwendu Nwaigbo			3 May 1990 (aged 24)
	11	(Nigeria)	Abdul Yahaya			24 April 1990 (aged 24)
	12	(Nigeria)	Celestine Nwafor			16 March 1994 (aged 20)
	13	(Nigeria)	Stanley Gumut	1.98 m (6 ft 6 in)	95 kg (209 lb)	21 February 1986 (aged 28)
	14	(Nigeria)	Victor Koko			14 December 1992 (aged 22)
	15	(Ivory Coast)	Mamadou Savagogo	2.02 m (6 ft 7 1/2 in)	105 kg (231 lb)	17 April 1978 (aged 36)

== (Angola) Primeiro de Agosto ==
Primeiro de Agosto – 2014 FIBA Africa Clubs Champions Cup – 6th place roster
Players							Coaches
Pos	#	Nat	Name	Height	Weight	Age	Head Coach
PF	4	(Angola)	Edson Ndoniema	1.91 m (6 ft 3 in)		11 February 1991 (aged 23)	(Angola) Paulo Macedo
PG	5	(Angola)	Armando Costa	1.92 m (6 ft 3 1/2 in)	91 kg (201 lb)	3 June 1983 (aged 31)
G	6	(United States)	Steve Briggs	1.77 m (5 ft 9 1/2 in)		20 December 1985 (aged 29)	Assistant coach(es)
PG	7	(Angola)	Hermenegildo Santos	1.89 m (6 ft 2 1/2 in)		16 August 1990 (aged 24)	(Angola) Walter Costa
PF	8	(Angola) (United States)	Reggie Moore	2.03 m (6 ft 8 in)	107 kg (236 lb)	31 March 1981 (aged 33)
C	9	(Angola)	Felizardo Ambrósio	2.02 m (6 ft 7 1/2 in)	97 kg (214 lb)	25 December 1987 (aged 26)
C	10	(Angola)	Joaquim Gomes (C)	2.00 m (6 ft 6 1/2 in)	100 kg (220 lb)	23 December 1980 (aged 33)
C	11	(Angola)	Mutu Fonseca	2.02 m (6 ft 7 1/2 in)		9 November 1989 (aged 25)
PF	12	(United States)	Roderick Nealy	2.01 m (6 ft 7 in)		6 September 1980 (aged 34)
SF	13	(Angola)	Islando Manuel	1.92 m (6 ft 3 1/2 in)		7 January 1991 (aged 23)
SG	14	(Portugal) (Angola)	Edmir Lucas	1.88 m (6 ft 2 in)	88 kg (194 lb)	15 July 1993 (aged 21)
G	15	(Angola)	Francisco Sousa	1.84 m (6 ft 1/2 in)		30 May 1982 (aged 32)

== (Angola) Recreativo do Libolo ==
Recreativo do Libolo – 2014 FIBA Africa Clubs Champions Cup – Gold medal roster
Players							Coaches
Pos	#	Nat	Name	Height	Weight	Age	Head Coach
	4	(Angola)	Benvindo Quimbamba			4 August 1993 (aged 21)	(Portugal) Norberto Alves
F	5	(Angola)	Luís Costa (C)	1.95 m (6 ft 5 in)	93 kg (205 lb)	7 June 1978 (aged 36)
	6	(Angola)	Manda João			19 January 1993 (aged 21)	Assistant coach(es)
	7	(Angola)	Elmer Felix			21 December 1989 (aged 24)	(Angola) Emanuel Trovoada
	8	(Angola)	Vladimir Pontes			9 November 1984 (aged 30)
PG	9	(Angola)	Mílton Barros	1.83 m (6 ft 0 in)	75 kg (165 lb)	21 June 1984 (aged 30)
	10	(Angola)	Ezequiel Silva			27 November 1988 (aged 26)
	11	(United States)	Andre Owens	1.93 m (6 ft 4 in)	90 kg (200 lb)	31 October 1980 (aged 34)
C	12	(Angola)	Valdelício Joaquim	2.09 m (6 ft 10 1/2 in)	108 kg (238 lb)	15 April 1990 (aged 24)
PF	13	(United States)	Erik Coleman	2.00 m (6 ft 6 1/2 in)	109 kg (240 lb)	8 August 1985 (aged 29)
SF	14	(Angola)	Filipe Abraão	1.94 m (6 ft 4 1/2 in)	88 kg (194 lb)	31 December 1979 (aged 34)
PF	15	(Angola)	Eduardo Mingas	1.98 m (6 ft 6 in)	106 kg (234 lb)	29 January 1979 (aged 35)

== (Egypt) Sporting Club Alexandria ==
Sporting Alexandria – 2014 FIBA Africa Clubs Champions Cup – 4th place roster
Players							Coaches
Pos	#	Nat	Name	Height	Weight	Age	Head Coach
	4	(Egypt)	Ahmed Alim	1.94 m (6 ft 4 1/2 in)		14 October 1992 (aged 22)	(Egypt) Ahmed Marei
	5	(Egypt)	Ahmed Tawfik	1.99 m (6 ft 6 1/2 in)		5 November 1987 (aged 27)
	6	(Egypt)	Mohamed Alian	1.96 m (6 ft 5 in)		10 January 1990 (aged 24)	Assistant coach(es)
	7	(Egypt)	Wael Kheder	1.92 m (6 ft 3 1/2 in)		1 December 1978 (aged 36)	(Egypt) Amr Elsaphky
	8	(Egypt)	Ahmed Abdel-Bary	1.86 m (6 ft 1 in)		2 September 1980 (aged 34)
	9	(Saudi Arabia)	Ezzeldin Rashed	1.86 m (6 ft 1 in)		13 March 1992 (aged 22)
	10	(Egypt)	Youssef Aboushousha	1.92 m (6 ft 3 1/2 in)		9 June 1993 (aged 21)
	11	(Egypt)	Mohamed Rashed	2.10 m (6 ft 10 1/2 in)		17 June 1987 (aged 27)
	12	(Tunisia)	Makrem Ben Romdhane	2.06 m (6 ft 9 in)	107 kg (236 lb)	27 March 1989 (aged 25)
	13	(Egypt)	Ibrahim Hegazi			17 April 1994 (aged 20)
	14	(Tunisia)	Hamdi Braa	2.03 m (6 ft 8 in)		7 September 1986 (aged 28)
	15	(Egypt)	Mohamed Khorshid			18 September 1985 (aged 29)

== (Tunisia) US Monastir ==
US Monastir – 2014 FIBA Africa Clubs Champions Cup – 5th place roster
Players							Coaches
Pos	#	Nat	Name	Height	Weight	Age	Head Coach
	4	(Tunisia)	Hedi Jeddi			17 August 1991 (aged 23)	(Slovenia) Ranko Mandic
	5	(Tunisia)	Hosni Saied			12 January 1981 (aged 33)
	6	(Tunisia)	Mohamed Trimech			1 June 1987 (aged 27)	Assistant coach(es)
	7	(Serbia)	Nemanja Marin			13 June 1990 (aged 24)	(Tunisia) Nayel Khayech
	8	(Tunisia)	Naji Jaziri			21 October 1994 (aged 20)
	9	(Tunisia)	Radhouane Slimane	2.05 m (6 ft 8 1/2 in)		16 August 1980 (aged 34)
	10	(Tunisia)	Ahmed Ben Said			4 April 1990 (aged 24)
	11	(Tunisia)	Firas Lahyani			16 July 1991 (aged 23)
	12	(Tunisia)	Marouan Laghnej	1.92 m (6 ft 3 1/2 in)		22 April 1986 (aged 28)
	13	(Tunisia)	Saif Aissaoui			17 January 1990 (aged 24)
	14	(Tunisia)	Mehdi Seyeh			4 September 1990 (aged 24)
	15	(Serbia)	Danilo Mitrović			21 May 1984 (aged 30)
