= 2013 FIBA Africa Clubs Champions Cup squads =

This article displays the rosters for the participating teams at the 2013 FIBA Africa Club Championship.

== (Libya) Al-Ahly Benghazi ==
Al-Ahly Benghazi – 2013 FIBA Africa Clubs Champions Cup – 8th place roster
Players							Coaches
Pos	#	Nat	Name	Height	Weight	Age	Head coach
	4	(Libya)	Ahmed Mohamed				(Serbia) Veselin Matić
	5	(Libya)	Muftah Elmogri
	6	(Libya)	Ibrahim Ali				Assistant coach(es)
	7	(Libya)	Mohamed Abulkhir			4 March 1987 (aged 26)
	8	(Libya)	Zain Makraz
	9	(Libya)	Mohamed Ben Mohamed
	10	(Libya)	Amin Shembesh
PF	11	(The Bahamas)	Torrington Cox	2.01 m (6 ft 7 in)		30 September 1985 (aged 28)
G	12	(United States)	Craig Winder	1.88 m (6 ft 2 in)	86 kg (190 lb)	14 April 1984 (aged 29)
	13	(Libya)	Gamal Ali
	14	(Libya)	Khalid Mohamed
	15	(Libya)	Khalil Shaglowf

== (Algeria) Club Sportif Constantinois ==
CS Constantine – 2013 FIBA Africa Clubs Champions Cup – 5th place roster
Players							Coaches
Pos	#	Nat	Name	Height	Weight	Age	Head coach
	4	(Algeria)	Abderahmane Ziad				(Algeria) Merouane Brahami
PG	5	(Algeria)	Abdelhalim Kaouane	1.80 m (5 ft 11 in)		29 November 1981 (aged 32)
	6	(Algeria)	Houcem Kabache				Assistant coach(es)
	7	(Algeria)	Sid Ali Ghrib
PG	8	(Algeria)	Ali Benhocine	1.80 m (5 ft 11 in)
G	9	(Algeria)	Adel Yezza	1.91 m (6 ft 3 in)
G	10	(Algeria)	Mohamed Zerouali	1.91 m (6 ft 3 in)		27 March 1990 (aged 23)
F	11	(Algeria)	Mohamed Saadallah	2.03 m (6 ft 8 in)
PF	12	(United States)	Theo Little	2.11 m (6 ft 11 in)	116 kg (256 lb)	22 May 1984 (aged 29)
C	13	(Algeria)	Tarek Oukid	2.05 m (6 ft 8 1/2 in)	96 kg (212 lb)	13 December 1979 (aged 34)
SF	14	(United States)	Isaac Wells	2.03 m (6 ft 8 in)	102 kg (225 lb)	18 August 1985 (aged 28)
	15	(Algeria)	Mohamed Belhoul			22 June 1986 (aged 27)

== (Tunisia) Étoile Sportive du Sahel ==
Étoile Sportive du Sahel – 2013 FIBA Africa Clubs Champions Cup – Silver Medal roster
Players							Coaches
Pos	#	Nat	Name	Height	Weight	Age	Head coach
PF	4	(Tunisia)	Moez Mestiri	1.98 m (6 ft 6 in)		6 April 1983 (aged 30)	(Cyprus) Pantelis Gavriel
G	5	(Tunisia)	Marouen Lahmar	1.85 m (6 ft 1 in)		7 February 1982 (aged 31)
G	6	(Tunisia)	Brahim Nadderi	1.80 m (5 ft 11 in)		1 October 1982 (aged 31)	Assistant coach(es)
PF	7	(Tunisia)	Zied Chennoufi	2.02 m (6 ft 7 1/2 in)		29 November 1988 (aged 25)
G	8	(Tunisia)	Omar Mouhli	1.90 m (6 ft 3 in)		19 March 1986 (aged 27)
	9	(Tunisia)	Mohamed Abbasi
G	10	(Tunisia) (France)	Marouan Kechrid	1.78 m (5 ft 10 in)	77 kg (170 lb)	2 June 1981 (aged 32)
C	11	(Croatia)	Dalibor Bagarić	2.16 m (7 ft 1 in)	132 kg (291 lb)	7 February 1980 (aged 33)
PF	12	(Tunisia)	Atef Maoua	2.00 m (6 ft 6 1/2 in)		28 January 1981 (aged 32)
F	13	(Tunisia)	Amine Rzig	1.98 m (6 ft 6 in)		25 August 1980 (aged 33)
G	14	(Tunisia)	Zied Toumi	1.90 m (6 ft 3 in)		17 July 1985 (aged 28)
C	15	(United States)	Kevin Bridgewater

== (Mozambique) Ferroviário da Beira ==
Ferroviário da Beira – 2013 FIBA Africa Clubs Champions Cup – 10th place roster
Players							Coaches
Pos	#	Nat	Name	Height	Weight	Age	Head coach
C	4	(United States)	Ephrem Davis	2.03 m (6 ft 8 in)	95 kg (209 lb)		(Spain) Luiz Lopez
C	5	(Mozambique)	Armando Baptista	2.00 m (6 ft 6 1/2 in)		2 June 1985 (aged 28)
	6	(Mozambique)	André Quicimusso			1 October 1982 (aged 31)	Assistant coach(es)
	7	(Mozambique)	Policarpo Zambeze				(Mozambique) Nilton Manheira
	8	(Mozambique)	Ismael Nurmamade			3 December 1991 (aged 22)	(Mozambique) Amarildo Taquidir
PF	9	(Mozambique)	Octávio Magoliço	1.97 m (6 ft 5 1/2 in)		4 October 1984 (aged 29)
	10	(Portugal) (Mozambique)	Augusto Matos	1.85 m (6 ft 1 in)		29 November 1990 (aged 23)
	11	(Mozambique)	Enoque Alage
PG	12	(Mozambique)	Amarildo Matos	1.90 m (6 ft 3 in)		12 March 1985 (aged 28)
	13	(Mozambique)	Carlos Marinze			26 April 1993 (aged 20)
	14	(Mozambique)	Euardo Lon
C	15	(United States)	Presano Bell	2.03 m (6 ft 8 in)	105 kg (231 lb)	19 February 1990 (aged 23)

== (Nigeria) Kano Pillars ==
Kano Pillars – 2013 FIBA Africa Clubs Champions Cup – 9th place roster
Players							Coaches
Pos	#	Nat	Name	Height	Weight	Age	Head coach
G	4	(Nigeria)	Adeolu Ojo	1.85 m (6 ft 1 in)	87 kg (192 lb)	9 August 1991 (aged 22)	(Nigeria) Sani Ahmed
G	5	(Nigeria)	Abdulwahab Yakubu	1.99 m (6 ft 6 1/2 in)	85 kg (187 lb)
G	6	(Nigeria)	Ibrahim Yusuf	1.96 m (6 ft 5 in)		4 May 1989 (aged 24)	Assistant coach(es)
F	7	(Nigeria)	Abubakar Usman	1.94 m (6 ft 4 1/2 in)		5 July 1986 (aged 27)	(Nigeria) Abdul Maku
C	8	(Nigeria)	Mathew Onmonya	1.98 m (6 ft 6 in)		29 November 1986 (aged 27)
F	9	(Nigeria)	Edem Ekpermong
G	10	(Nigeria)	Alex Ujoh	1.90 m (6 ft 3 in)		9 April 1986 (aged 27)
F	11	(Nigeria)	Abdul Yahaya	2.06 m (6 ft 9 in)
C	12	(Nigeria)	Mustapha Yusuf	2.01 m (6 ft 7 in)		7 June 1986 (aged 27)
F	13	(Nigeria)	Sadio Adedej
F	14	(Nigeria)	Daniel Ademola	2.00 m (6 ft 6 1/2 in)		11 January 1979 (aged 34)
C	15	(Nigeria)	Onyeka Okeke	2.02 m (6 ft 7 1/2 in)		7 September 1988 (aged 25)

== (Liberia) LPRC Oilers ==
LPRC Oilers – 2013 FIBA Africa Clubs Champions Cup – 12th place roster
Players							Coaches
Pos	#	Nat	Name	Height	Weight	Age	Head coach
	4	(Liberia)	Yamoussa Camara				Paul Houlsen
	5	(Liberia)	Glen Nimely
	6	(Liberia)	Aloysius Teah				Assistant coach(es)
	7	(Liberia)	Samuel Davidson				Charles Cummings
	8	(Liberia)	Choko Lee
	9	(Liberia)	Manobah Mbaimba
	10	(Liberia)	Mohammed Jabateh
C	11	(Liberia)	Jethro Bing	1.99 m (6 ft 6 1/2 in)
	12	(Liberia)	Clarence Davies
F	13	(Liberia)	John Bing	1.98 m (6 ft 6 in)
	14	(Liberia)	Ben Dixon (C)
	15	(Liberia)	Moucta Toure			13 January 1993 (aged 20)

== (Equatorial Guinea) Malabo Kings ==
Malabo Kings – 2013 FIBA Africa Clubs Champions Cup – 7th place roster
Players							Coaches
Pos	#	Nat	Name	Height	Weight	Age	Head coach
	4	(Equatorial Guinea)	Enrique Mbaga				(Spain) Miguel Hoyos
F	5	(Equatorial Guinea)	Óscar Ngomo	1.97 m (6 ft 5 1/2 in)		1 January 1990 (aged 23)
	6	(Spain) (Equatorial Guinea)	Melanio Ebendeng			9 May 1982 (aged 31)	Assistant coach(es)
	7	(Equatorial Guinea)	Francisco Mba			14 February 1989 (aged 24)
C	8	(Spain)	Hernández-Sonseca	2.12 m (6 ft 11 1/2 in)	111 kg (245 lb)	21 June 1983 (aged 30)
	9	(Equatorial Guinea) (Spain)	Arturo Noha			25 September 1980 (aged 33)
	10	(Cameroon)	Martin Obiang			5 June 1986 (aged 28)
	11	(Equatorial Guinea)	José O. Nchama			4 September 1985 (aged 28)
	12	(Equatorial Guinea)	Francisco Mba
G	13	(Equatorial Guinea) (Spain)	Richard Nguema	1.92 m (6 ft 3 1/2 in)		7 February 1988 (aged 25)
	14	(Equatorial Guinea)	Juan Manguire
C	15	(Mali)	Mamadou Diarra	2.13 m (7 ft 0 in)	108 kg (238 lb)	29 August 1986 (aged 27)

== (Angola) Primeiro de Agosto ==
Primeiro de Agosto – 2013 FIBA Africa Clubs Champions Cup – Gold Medal roster
Players							Coaches
Pos	#	Nat	Name	Height	Weight	Age	Head coach
PF	4	(Angola)	Edson Ndoniema	1.91 m (6 ft 3 in)		11 February 1991 (aged 22)	(Angola) Paulo Macedo
PG	5	(Angola)	Armando Costa	1.92 m (6 ft 3 1/2 in)	91 kg (201 lb)	3 June 1983 (aged 30)
PG	6	(Angola)	Hermenegildo Santos	1.89 m (6 ft 2 1/2 in)		16 August 1990 (aged 23)	Assistant coach(es)
SF	7	(Cape Verde)	Mário Correia	1.89 m (6 ft 2 1/2 in)		17 March 1978 (aged 35)	(Angola) Walter Costa
C	8	(Angola)	Francisco Machado	2.05 m (6 ft 8 1/2 in)		23 February 1981 (aged 32)
C	9	(Angola)	Felizardo Ambrósio	2.02 m (6 ft 7 1/2 in)	97 kg (214 lb)	25 December 1987 (aged 25)
C	10	(Angola)	Joaquim Gomes	2.00 m (6 ft 6 1/2 in)	100 kg (220 lb)	23 December 1980 (aged 32)
C	11	(Angola)	Mutu Fonseca	2.02 m (6 ft 7 1/2 in)		9 November 1989 (aged 24)
SG	12	(Rwanda) (United States)	Cedric Isom	1.88 m (6 ft 2 in)		6 June 1984 (aged 29)
SF	13	(Angola)	Islando Manuel	1.92 m (6 ft 3 1/2 in)		7 January 1991 (aged 22)
SG	14	(Portugal) (Angola)	Edmir Lucas	1.88 m (6 ft 2 in)	88 kg (194 lb)	15 July 1993 (aged 20)
PF	15	(Angola)	Agostinho Coelho	1.98 m (6 ft 6 in)		21 January 1990 (aged 23)

== (Angola) Recreativo do Libolo ==
Recreativo do Libolo – 2013 FIBA Africa Clubs Champions Cup – Bronze Medal roster
Players							Coaches
Pos	#	Nat	Name	Height	Weight	Age	Head coach
F	4	(Angola)	Olímpio Cipriano	1.94 m (6 ft 4 1/2 in)	93 kg (205 lb)	9 April 1982 (aged 31)	(Portugal) Norberto Alves
F	5	(Angola)	Luís Costa	1.94 m (6 ft 4 1/2 in)	93 kg (205 lb)	7 June 1978 (aged 35)
SG	6	(Angola)	Carlos Morais	1.93 m (6 ft 4 in)	91 kg (201 lb)	16 October 1985 (aged 28)	Assistant coach(es)
	7	(Angola)	José Miguel			20 August 1985 (aged 28)	(Angola) Ricardo Rodrigues
G	8	(Angola)	Francisco Sousa	1.84 m (6 ft 1/2 in)		30 May 1982 (aged 31)
G	9	(Angola)	Bráulio Morais	1.90 m (6 ft 3 in)	88 kg (194 lb)	17 December 1990 (aged 23)
C	10	(Portugal) (Angola)	António Monteiro	2.03 m (6 ft 8 in)		2 April 1989 (aged 24)
PF	11	(United States) (The Gambia)	Moses Sonko	1.96 m (6 ft 5 in)	95 kg (209 lb)	7 October 1983 (aged 30)
C	12	(Angola) (Chad)	Abdel Bouckar	2.02 m (6 ft 7 1/2 in)	109 kg (240 lb)	8 April 1980 (aged 33)
PF	13	(United States)	Eric Coleman	2.00 m (6 ft 6 1/2 in)	109 kg (240 lb)	8 August 1985 (aged 28)
SF	14	(Angola)	Filipe Abraão	1.94 m (6 ft 4 1/2 in)	88 kg (194 lb)	31 December 1979 (aged 33)
PF	15	(Angola)	Eduardo Mingas	1.98 m (6 ft 6 in)	106 kg (234 lb)	29 January 1979 (aged 34)

== (Egypt) Sporting Club Alexandria ==
Sporting Alexandria – 2013 FIBA Africa Clubs Champions Cup – 4th place roster
Players							Coaches
Pos	#	Nat	Name	Height	Weight	Age	Head coach
	4	(Egypt)	Amer Ahmed				Ahmed Marei
	5	(Egypt)	Ahmed Tawfik			5 November 1987 (aged 26)
	6	(Egypt)	Mohamed Alian	1.98 m (6 ft 6 in)		10 January 1990 (aged 23)	Assistant coach(es)
	7	(Egypt)	Wael Khedr	1.98 m (6 ft 6 in)		1 December 1978 (aged 35)
	8	(Egypt)	Ahmed Abdel-bary	1.86 m (6 ft 1 in)		2 September 1980 (aged 33)
	9	(Egypt)	Ezzeldin Rashed
	10	(Egypt)	Youssef Shousha	1.93 m (6 ft 4 in)		9 June 1993 (aged 20)
	11	(Egypt)	Mohamed Elbarbary
	12	(Tunisia)	Hamdi Braa	2.03 m (6 ft 8 in)	103 kg (227 lb)	7 September 1986 (aged 27)
C	13	(Egypt)	Mohamed Khorshid	1.95 m (6 ft 5 in)	2.05 m (6 ft 8 1/2 in)	18 September 1985 (aged 28)
PF	14	(Egypt)	Mohamed Elkerdany			24 April 1977 (aged 36)
C	15	(Belize) (United States)	Noel Felix	2.06 m (6 ft 9 in)	102 kg (225 lb)	4 October 1981 (aged 32)

== (Gabon) Tali BB ==
Tali BB – 2013 FIBA Africa Clubs Champions Cup – 6th place roster
Players							Coaches
Pos	#	Nat	Name	Height	Weight	Age	Head coach
	4	(Gabon)	Sylvers Abbesolo
G	5	(Gabon)	Dario Edouba
	6	(Gabon)	Axe Ossami			15 March 1994 (aged 19)	Assistant coach(es)
	7	(Gabon)	Junior Messi-Messi
	8	(Gabon)	Maxime Shamba
	9	(Gabon)	Ronaldo Mydiambo
	10	(Gabon)	Francis Koubanguy
	11	(Gabon)	Armand Bouli
C	12	(Gabon)	Jason Reteno	2.03 m (6 ft 8 in)		8 October 1977 (aged 36)
	13	(Gabon)	Robert Ndong			11 April 1982 (aged 31)
	14	(Gabon)	Lerry Essono Mvé			11 March 1992 (aged 21)
G	15	(Gabon)	Lionel Fabre	1.88 m (6 ft 2 in)

== (Burundi) Urunani ==
Urunani – 2013 FIBA Africa Clubs Champions Cup – 11th place roster
Players							Coaches
Pos	#	Nat	Name	Height	Weight	Age	Head coach
	4	(Burundi)	Willy Nijimbere			5 December 1980 (aged 33)
	5	(Burundi)	Blaise Higwa
	6	(Burundi)	Roger Havyhrimana			15 May 1986 (aged 27)	Assistant coach(es)
	7	(Burundi)	Sudi Cubahiro			30 April 1991 (aged 22)
	8	(Burundi)	Elvis Hakizimana			10 August 1985 (aged 28)
	9	(Burundi)	Jean-Jacque Nzobonimpa
	10	(Burundi)	Blaise Nikobahoze			12 April 1988 (aged 25)
	11	(Burundi)	Jean Niagunduka
	12	(Burundi)	Landry Ndikumana
	13	(Burundi)	Alexis Hakizimana
	14	(Burundi)	Desire Muco
	15	(Burundi)	Bruce Ndayizeye			3 October 1980 (aged 33)
