= Ellis Kayijuka =

Brazilian basketball player

Thiago Cordeiro (born in Pernambuco, but listed by Rwanda as born Ellis Kayijuka on April 30, 1981, in Nyamirambo) is a Brazilian basketball player who was part of the Rwanda national basketball team at the 2009 FIBA Africa Championship. He played for Dayton Flyers men's basketball in the 2007–08 season.

Kayijuka was a late addition to the Rwandan team for the 2009 FIBA Africa Championship after two Rwandan players pulled out of the tournament three weeks before the scheduled opener. Despite this, Kayijuka averaged 5.8 PPG, 5 RPG, and 1.6 BPG while teaming with Robert Thomson in the middle to help lead the Rwandans to a 9th-place finish and their best performance to date at the African Championships.
