= Amandin =

Amandin may refer to:

- Saint-Amandin, a commune in south-central France
- Amandin Rutayisire (born 1985), Rwandan basketball player

== See also ==
- Amandine (disambiguation)
