= Mohamed Abulkhir =

Libyan basketball player (born 1987)

Mohamed Moftah Zaïd Abulkhir (born 4 March 1987 in Tripoli) is a Libyan basketball player.

== Career ==
Abulkhir was part of the Libya men's national basketball team at AfroBasket 2009, where he averaged 4 points per game over 8 games.
