= Koumba =

Koumba is a surname. Notable people with the surname include:

- Jean Koumba (born 1983), basketball player from the Republic of the Congo
- Justin Koumba (born 1947), Congolese politician

== See also ==
- Tales of Amadou Koumba or Les Contes d'Amadou Koumba is a collection of tales from Senegal, transcribed by Birago Diop from the accounts of the griot Amadou, son of Kumba
