= AfroBasket 2009 =

Tournament details
- Host country: Libya
- Dates: 5–15 August
- Teams: 16
- Venues: 2 (in 2 host cities)

Final positions
- Champions: Angola (10th title)
- Runners-up: Ivory Coast
- Third place: Tunisia
- Fourth place: Cameroon

Tournament statistics
- MVP: (Angola) Joaquim Gomes
- Top scorer: (Cape Verde) Jeff Xavier (27.2 points per game)

AfroBasket 2009 was the 25th FIBA Africa Championship, played under the auspices of the Fédération Internationale de Basketball, the basketball sport governing body, and the African zone thereof. At stake were the three berths allocated to Africa in the 2010 FIBA World Championship. The tournament was hosted by Libya after Nigeria, the original host, withdrew from hosting after not conforming to FIBA Africa guidelines.

Angola won its sixth consecutive African championship and tenth overall by beating Côte d'Ivoire 82-72 in the championship game. Tunisia won the bronze medal game over Cameroon to earn its first-ever FIBA World Championship berth. Angola, Côte d'Ivoire, and Tunisia move on to represent Africa at the 2010 FIBA World Championship in Turkey. Angola's Joaquim Gomes claimed the tournament's Most Valuable Player award for the second consecutive Afrobasket tournament.

== Tournament Overview ==
Widely considered among the most coveted sporting competitions in Africa, AfroBasket 2009 was hosted by Libya from August 5 to August 15, 2009. Games were played in Tripoli and Benghazi, with four groups being equally divided between the country’s two largest cities.

It is estimated that over 70 media channels covered the engagements, with the top three positioned squads automatically qualifying to represent the continent for the 2010 World Championship, to be held from August 28 to September 12, in Turkey. This historic event also coincides with ongoing celebratory activities marking the 40th anniversary of Libya's 1 September Revolution (Great Al-Fatih Revolution) which brought Muammar Gaddafi to power, and the tenth anniversary of the Sirte Declaration establishing the African Union (AU) on September 9, 1999.

== Host Selection Process ==
Libya's selection as the host country was decided by the Fédération Internationale de Basketball (FIBA) Executive Committee, approved by the Central Board of FIBA Africa, and officially announced in Tripoli on February 7, 2009. The decision favoring Libya to organize the 25th edition, followed the withdrawal of Nigeria who failed to conform to FIBA Africa guidelines. Signing of the official contract was conducted at a ceremony at Tripoli’s Corinthia Bab Africa Hotel on February 4, 2009, in the presence of Libya’s National Olympic Committee president Mohammad Al-Amariy, Dr. Muhammad Gaddafi, and president of the Libyan Arab Basketball Federation (LBF), Omar El Barshushi.

Before reaching the contract signing stage, and after Nigeria’s withdrawal, an organizing committee was formed by FIBA to investigate the facilities Libya had to offer regarding basketball courts and the possibility of refurbishing sites. At the 4th Session of FIBA-Africa Central Committee meeting in Cairo, Egypt on January 25, 2009, the Libyan organizing committee presented plans and the preparation undertaken in order to successfully host the championships. The Central Board members who also made their recommendations approved the LBF presentation, which has been an FIBA Africa affiliate since 1961, and were described as excellent. The president of the Local Organizing Committee (LOC) invited FIBA Africa’s officials in Tripoli to view first hand Libya’s preparations. To this end, before signing the contract between FIBA Africa and LBF, the Secretary General of FIBA Africa, Dr. Alphonse Bilé, the Assistant Secretary General, Adel Tooma and the President of the Commission for Competitions, Raouf Menjour, checked thoroughly the facilities and basketball courts that will serve the event and gave their approval.

== Venues ==
Two Libyan cities, Benghazi and Tripoli hosted games in the tournament. Benghazi hosted games in Groups A, B, and E. Tripoli hosted games in Groups C, D, and F, in addition to the knockout round games.

Games in Tripoli were held in the African Union Arena, a modern, 7,000 seat arena built in the capital city in 2006. Games in Benghazi were held in the Suliman Ad-Dharrath Arena, part of the Medina al-Riyadhia (Sports City), the city's largest sporting centre. The 10,000 seat arena was built in 1967 and is therefore quite outdated. However, the stadia has undergone maintenance work in recent years.

Benghazi	Afrobasket 2009 (Libya)	Tripoli
Suliman Ad-Dharrath Arena	Afrobasket 2009 (Libya)	African Union Arena
Capacity: 10,000	Afrobasket 2009 (Libya)	Capacity: 7,000

== Qualification ==
Participants were sixteen national basketball teams among the 53 FIBA Africa members. These teams included the host nation, the top three sides at the FIBA Africa Championship 2007 in Angola, one wild card, and the top eleven sides at the 2009 Zone preliminary basketball competitions. None of the countries in Qualification Zone 7 registered for the qualifying tournament, so a second wild card was added. 14 of the 16 teams that competed for the 2007 Championship returned, with host Libya and Congo replacing Liberia and DR Congo. The following national teams competed:

Number	Team	Qualified as	Finals Appearance	Last Appearance
1	Libya	Host	4th	1978
2	Angola	1st place FIBA Africa Championship 2007	16th	2007
3	Cameroon	2nd place FIBA Africa Championship 2007	5th	2007
4	Cape Verde	3rd place FIBA Africa Championship 2007	4th	2007
5	Tunisia	Zone 1 Winner	18th	2007
6	Morocco	Zone 1 Runner-Up	16th	2007
7	Mali	Zone 2 Winner	15th	2007
8	Nigeria	Zone 3 Winner	14th	2007
9	Ivory Coast	Zone 3 Runner-Up	19th	2007
10	Central African Republic	Zone 4 Winner	15th	2007
11	Congo	Zone 4 Runner-Up	5th	1985
12	Egypt	Zone 5 Winner	19th	2007
13	Rwanda	Zone 5 Runner-Up	2nd	2007
14	Mozambique	Zone 6 Winner	10th	2007
15	Senegal	Wild Card	24th	2007
16	South Africa	Wild Card	7th	2007

== Format ==
A revised format will debut in the 2009 championship:

- The teams will be divided into four groups (Groups A-D) for the preliminary round.
- Round robin for the preliminary round; the top three teams from each group advance to the next round.
- The top three teams from Groups A and B qualify to Eighth Final round Group E; the top three teams from Groups C and D qualify to Eighth Final Group F. The final scores of all games played in the preliminary round are valid for the eighth final round, including games against teams that did not advance beyond the preliminary round.
- The top four teams from each of the Eighth final groups advance to the sudden-death quarterfinals. The quarterfinal match-ups will be:
  - QF1: 1E vs. 4F
  - QF2: 2F vs. 3E
  - QF3: 2E vs. 3F
  - QF4: 1F vs. 4E
- The winners in the quarterfinals advance to the semifinals. The match-ups are:
  - SF1: QFW1 vs. QFW2
  - SF2: QFW3 vs. QFW4
  - Winners secure an automatic berth to the 2010 World Championship.
- The semifinal teams will play in the sudden-death finals. The match-ups for the finals are:
  - Bronze medal game: SFL1 vs. SFL2
    - Winner secures an automatic berth to the 2010 World Championship.
  - Gold medal game: SFW1 vs. SFW2
- Top 3 teams will automatically qualify to the 2010 FIBA World Championship which is held in Turkey.

== Squads ==
Each of the sixteen teams competing was eligible to field a squad of twelve players for the tournament. Only Cape Verde and host Libya did not take advantage of this limit, as both teams sent an 11-man squad to the competition.

== Results ==
=== Preliminary round ===
The draw was held on June 26, 2009, in Libya.

Qualified for the quarterfinals
Eliminated in Preliminary round

All times are in local time UTC+2

==== Group A ====
Group A went according to form, as African powerhouse Nigeria was rarely challenged in the group en route to going undefeated. Côte d'Ivoire grabbed the second eighth final spot out of Group A by winning its last two group games after losing its tournament opener to the Nigerians. Host Libya, making its first tournament appearance since 1978, won its tournament opener over South Africa. This was enough to qualify for the eighth final round as last place South Africa lost its last two games by a combined 85 points.

Team	Pld	W	L	PF	PA	PD	Pts
Nigeria	3	3	0	287	214	+73	6
Ivory Coast	3	2	1	251	214	+37	5
Libya	3	1	2	233	242	-9	4
South Africa	3	0	3	178	279	-101	3

August 5
16:00

Report

Ivory Coast	84–93	Nigeria
Scoring by quarter: 14–25, 26–18, 9–22, 35–28
Scoring by half: 40–43, 44–50
Pts: D. Tape 16; Rebs: M. Kone 13; Asts: M. Diabate 7		Pts: M. Efevberha 29; Rebs: G. Muoneke 10; Asts: M. Efevberha 4

Suliman Ad-Dharrath Arena, Benghazi

August 5
21:30

Report

Libya	88–72	South Africa
Scoring by quarter: 13–18, 18–12, 27–17, 30–25
Scoring by half: 31–30, 57–42
Pts: A. Belgasem 25; Rebs: H. Salem 13; Asts: M. Youssef Ben Elhaj 5		Pts: N. Mothiba 24; Rebs: N. Mothiba 6 Asts: N. Mothiba 2

Suliman Ad-Dharrath Arena, Benghazi
Attendance: 4,500

August 6
16:30

Report

South Africa	49–97	Nigeria
Scoring by quarter: 6-28, 18-23, 13-27, 12-19
Scoring by half: 24-51, 25-46
Pts: C. Gabriel 13; Rebs: F. Mazibuko 6 Asts: 2 tied with 2		Pts: C. Oguchi 20; Rebs: E. Ugboaja 13; Asts: M. Umeh 5

Suliman Ad-Dharrath Arena, Benghazi
Attendance: 2,500

August 6
19:00

Report

Ivory Coast	73–64	Libya
Scoring by quarter: 19-23, 21-14, 13-5, 20-22
Scoring by half: 40-37, 33-27
Pts: E. Craven 16; Rebs: M. Kone 8 Asts: E. Craven 4		Pts: A. Belgasem 21; Rebs: H. Salem 13; Asts: A. Belgasem 3

Suliman Ad-Dharrath Arena, Benghazi
Attendance: 3,200

August 7
14:00

Report

Ivory Coast	94–57	South Africa
Scoring by quarter: 26-15, 22-17, 30-17, 16-8
Scoring by half: 48-32, 46-25
Pts: P. Amagou 18; Rebs: J. Kale 9 Asts: M. Diabate 6		Pts: N. Mothiba 11; Rebs: L. Sibankulu 7 Asts: 4 tied with 2

Suliman Ad-Dharrath Arena, Benghazi

August 7
19:00

Report

Libya	81–97	Nigeria
Scoring by quarter: 26-23, 23-23, 11-33, 21-18
Scoring by half: 49-46, 32-51
Pts: M. Youssef 19; Rebs: H. Salem 7 Asts: A. Belgasem 4		Pts: M. Efevberha 27; Rebs: G. Muoneke 7 Asts: J. Akognon 6

Suliman Ad-Dharrath Arena, Benghazi

==== Group B ====
Five-time defending champion Angola surprisingly struggled in its first two games, slipping by Mali by 5 after ending the game on an 8–3 run, and beating Egypt after trailing at the half. Angola again found themselves tied at the half against Mozambique before finally hitting their stride in outscoring their opponents 60–17 in the second half. Mali took control in the second half against Egypt to finish second in the group; both teams advanced by virtue of their victories over last place Mozambique.

Team	Pld	W	L	PF	PA	PD	Pts
Angola	3	3	0	251	193	+58	6
Mali	3	2	1	208	180	+28	5
Egypt	3	1	2	188	208	-20	4
Mozambique	3	0	3	166	232	-66	3

August 5
11:00

Report

Mozambique	62–72	Egypt
Scoring by quarter: 15–19, 14–18, 12–26, 21–9
Scoring by half: 29–37, 33–35
Pts: O. Magoliço 18; Rebs: S. Adam 7 Asts: F. Mandlate 3		Pts: A. Fanan 14; Rebs: M. Adly 7 Asts: A. Fanan 4

Suliman Ad-Dharrath Arena, Benghazi

August 5
13:30

Report

Angola	79–74	Mali
Scoring by quarter: 24–24, 21–14, 21–23, 13–13
Scoring by half: 45–38, 34–36
Pts: J. Gomes 31; Rebs: A. Costa 13; Asts: 2 tied with 3		Pts: A. Sy 19; Rebs: L. Chelle 4 Asts: 3 tied with 2

Suliman Ad-Dharrath Arena, Benghazi

August 6
14:00

Report

Mali	67–54	Mozambique
Scoring by quarter: 18–17, 18–16, 18-8, 13–13
Scoring by half: 36–33, 31–21
Pts: N. Diakité 17; Rebs: Traore and Diakité 8 each Asts: L. Chelle 6		Pts: O. Magoliço 11; Rebs: S. Muianga 5 Asts: C. Muchate 3

Suliman Ad-Dharrath Arena, Benghazi

August 6
21:30

Report

Egypt	69–79	Angola
Scoring by quarter: 23–17, 5–10, 12–26, 29–26
Scoring by half: 28–27, 41–52
Pts: A. Fanan 13; Rebs: M. Khorshid 7 Asts: W. Badr 4		Pts: C. Almeida 17; Rebs: A. Costa 6 Asts: A. Costa 4

Suliman Ad-Dharrath Arena, Benghazi

August 7
16:30

Report

Egypt	47–67	Mali
Scoring by quarter: 14-17, 15-10, 12-21, 6-19
Scoring by half: 29-27, 18-40
Pts: R. Gunady 9 Rebs: W. Badr 7 Asts: W. Badr 3		Pts: L. Chelle 14; Rebs: A. Sy 10; Asts: L. Chelle 3

Suliman Ad-Dharrath Arena, Benghazi

August 7
21:30

Report

Angola	93–50	Mozambique
Scoring by quarter: 12-18, 21-15, 22-9, 38-8
Scoring by half: 33-33, 60-17
Pts: E. Mingas 16; Rebs: F. Ambrosio 7 Asts: O. Cipriano 5		Pts: S. Adam 11; Rebs: S. Muianga 7 Asts: C. Muchate 3

Suliman Ad-Dharrath Arena, Benghazi

==== Group C ====
2005 silver medalists Senegal and 2007 silver medalists Cameroon both cruised to victories in their first two games to qualify for the eighth final round. Senegal won a hard-fought two-point victory over Cameroon in the final group game to grab first place in the group. Central African Republic thrashed over-matched Congo 113–61, in what amounted to an elimination game between two 0–2 teams on the last match day, to grab the final eighth final spot out of Group C.

Team	Pld	W	L	PF	PA	PD	Pts
Senegal	3	3	0	244	202	+42	6
Cameroon	3	2	1	214	192	+22	5
Central African Republic	3	1	2	251	222	+29	4
Congo	3	0	3	185	278	-93	3

August 5
13:30

Report

Senegal	95–68	Congo
Scoring by quarter: 28-24, 27-21, 25-12, 15-11
Scoring by half: 55-45, 40-23
Pts: B. Ndong 26; Rebs: B. Cisse 10; Asts: B. Cisse 10		Pts: J. Koumba 22; Rebs: J. Koumba 8 Asts: B. Dibessa 4

African Union Arena, Tripoli

August 5
16:00

Report

Cameroon	79–69	Central African Republic
Scoring by quarter: 25–8, 18-27, 18–23, 18–11
Scoring by half: 43–35, 36-34
Pts: G Essengué 19; Rebs: H. Nana 8 Asts: C. Makanda 5		Pts: L. Bomayako 17; Rebs: M. Mombollet 7 Asts: Y. Zachée 4

African Union Arena, Tripoli

August 6
14:00

Report

Central African Republic	69–82	Senegal
Scoring by quarter: 16-24, 14-19, 19-22, 20-17
Scoring by half: 30-43, 39-39
Pts: R. Sato 30; Rebs: M. Mombollet 7 Asts: M. Kougere 2		Pts: M. Faye 19; Rebs: N. Diop 16; Asts: B. Cisse 7

African Union Arena, Tripoli

August 6
16:30

Report

Congo	56–70	Cameroon
Scoring by quarter: 6–25, 15-13, 19-16, 16-16
Scoring by half: 21-38, 35-32
Pts: J. Koumba 19; Rebs: J. Koumba 10; Asts: T. Okobo Itoua 3		Pts: H. Nana 14; Rebs: A. Aboya 10; Asts: P. Bouli 5

African Union Arena, Tripoli

August 7
14:00

Report

Congo	61–113	Central African Republic
Scoring by quarter: 17-26, 14-32, 13-35, 17-20
Scoring by half: 31-58, 30-55
Pts: J. Koumba 19; Rebs: R. Kondzy 10; Asts: H. Assoua-Wande 5		Pts: R. Sato 21; Rebs: M. Mombollet 9 Asts: Y. Zachée 5

African Union Arena, Tripoli

August 7
19:00

Report

Cameroon	65–67	Senegal
Scoring by quarter: 13-14, 20-25, 12-14, 20-14
Scoring by half: 33-39, 32-28
Pts: B. Vounang 15; Rebs: Y. Mekongo Mbala 6 Asts: J. Ekanga Ehawa 4		Pts: B. Ndong 17; Rebs: N. Diop 15; Asts: B. Cisse 5

African Union Arena, Tripoli

==== Group D ====
Group D was the most tightly contested preliminary round group. These games resulted in the most surprising result of this stage of the tournament as defending bronze medalists Cape Verde were eliminated even after their opening victory over Tunisia in spite of the efforts of Jeff Xavier, who would finish as the tournament's leading scorer. Group D also saw one of the best games of the tournament, as Morocco's Mohamad Hachad single-handedly shocked Rwanda when he hit a three-pointer with 29 seconds left, then stole the ball and passed to Yunss Akinocho for a jumper to erase a four-point lead in an 85–84 victory. Tunisia and Morocco both advanced with victories on the final day of group play after no team had clinched a spot in the eighth final coming into the final games. Rwanda also advanced by virtue of its ten-point victory over Cape Verde.

Team	Pld	W	L	PF	PA	PD	Pts	Tie
Tunisia	3	2	1	224	207	+17	5	1-0
Morocco	3	2	1	250	265	-15	5	0-1
Rwanda	3	1	2	218	226	-8	4	1-0
Cape Verde	3	1	2	221	215	+6	4	0-1

August 5
11:00

Report

Cape Verde	71–52	Tunisia
Scoring by quarter: 15-12, 11-16, 17-12, 28-12
Scoring by half: 26-28, 45-24
Pts: J. Xavier 20; Rebs: M. Houtman 9 Asts: 5 tied with 2		Pts: N. Dhifallah 13; Rebs: A. Rzig 10; Asts: A. Rzig 4

African Union Arena, Tripoli

August 5
21:30

Report

Morocco	85–84	Rwanda
Scoring by quarter: 15-19, 14-23, 23-20, 33-22
Scoring by half: 29-42, 56-42
Pts: Z. El Masbahi 37; Rebs: A. Najah 14; Asts: M. Hachad 7		Pts: K. Gasana 31; Rebs: R. Thomson 11; Asts: K. Gasana 5

African Union Arena, Tripoli

August 6
19:00

Report

Rwanda	77–67	Cape Verde
Scoring by quarter: 20-25, 12-17, 24-11, 21-14
Scoring by half: 32-42, 45-25
Pts: M. Miller 18; Rebs: R. Thomson 11; Asts: A. Rutayisire 7		Pts: J. Xavier 19; Rebs: R. Mascarenhas 15; Asts: R. Mascarenhas 3

African Union Arena, Tripoli

August 6
21:30

Report

Tunisia	98–79	Morocco
Scoring by quarter: 26-21, 26-19, 18-23, 28-16
Scoring by half: 52-40, 46-39
Pts: A. Rzig 20; Rebs: H. Braa 8 Asts: M. Kechrid 5		Pts: M. Hachad 20; Rebs: M. Hachad 6 Asts: M. Hachad 4

African Union Arena, Tripoli

August 7
16:30

Report

Cape Verde	83–86	Morocco
Scoring by quarter: 19-19, 24-16, 22-25, 18-26
Scoring by half: 43-35, 40-51
Pts: J. Xavier 32; Rebs: P. Cipriano 13; Asts: J. Xavier 3		Pts: Y. Idrissi 20; Rebs: A. Najah 9 Asts: M. Hachad 4

African Union Arena, Tripoli

August 7
21:30

Report

Rwanda	57–74	Tunisia
Scoring by quarter: 15-19, 9-21, 12-26, 21-8
Scoring by half: 24-40, 33-34
Pts: M. Miller 15; Rebs: R. Thomson 18; Asts: 3 tied with 2		Pts: A. Rzig 18; Rebs: A. Rzig 8 Asts: A. Rzig 4

African Union Arena, Tripoli

=== Eighth Final round ===
==== Group E ====
Group E went according to form as defending champion Angola continued its undefeated run in the tournament by dismantling Libya and Côte d'Ivoire in its first two games. Nigeria followed suit, albeit in less than dominating fashion, by slipping by Egypt and Mali to set up a showdown in the final group play match with Angola. Nigeria hung with the defending champions in a hard-fought game that was close the whole way, but the Nigerians could not close the deficit below two in the fourth quarter en route to a 93–85 loss.

Mali coasted to two easy victories over Côte d'Ivoire and Libya to finish third in the group. Côte d'Ivoire pulled away from Egypt in the fourth quarter to grab the final quarterfinal spot of the group. Egypt lost all three games, including a humiliating 75–73 loss to Libya on Raed Elhamali's buzzer beater. This was the first time in 19 appearances at the FIBA Africa Championship that the Egyptians failed to qualify for the semifinals.

Team	Pld	W	L	PF	PA	PD	Pts
Angola	6	6	0	523	397	+126	12
Nigeria	6	5	1	533	454	+79	11
Mali	6	4	2	444	385	+61	10
Ivory Coast	6	3	3	450	437	+13	9
Libya	6	2	4	439	501	-62	8
Egypt	6	1	5	402	450	-48	7

August 9
16:30

Report

Mali	71–58	Ivory Coast
Scoring by quarter: 17-14, 14-10, 20-14, 20-20
Scoring by half: 31-24, 40-34
Pts: W. Coulibaly 16; Rebs: A. Sy 14; Asts: A. Sy 7		Pts: D. Tape 13; Rebs: M. Kone 6 Asts: P. Amagou 6

Suliman Ad-Dharrath Arena, Benghazi
Attendance: 2,500

August 9
19:00

Report

Angola	91–58	Libya
Scoring by quarter: 24-15, 15-15, 27-7, 25-21
Scoring by half: 39-30, 52-28
Pts: C. Morais 20; Rebs: J. Gomes 7 Asts: A. Costa 6		Pts: W. Dawo 15; Rebs: H. Salem 8 Asts: 3 tied with 2

Suliman Ad-Dharrath Arena, Benghazi
Attendance: 3,200

August 9
21:30

Report

Egypt	77–87	Nigeria
Scoring by quarter: 17-19, 22-25, 15-20, 23-23
Scoring by half: 39-44, 38-43
Pts: R. Gunady 16; Rebs: Mohamed and Khorshid 7 each Asts: W. Badr 5		Pts: G. Muoneke 14; Rebs: A. Akingbala 8 Asts: G. Muoneke 3

Suliman Ad-Dharrath Arena, Benghazi

August 10
16:30

Report

Ivory Coast	61–88	Angola
Scoring by quarter: 18-24, 18-17, 13-29, 12-18
Scoring by half: 36-41, 25-47
Pts: Tape, Kale, and Kone 9 each Rebs: J. Kale 5 Asts: M. Diabate 2		Pts: C. Marais 18; Rebs: Mingas and Gomes 7 each Asts: C. Almeida 4

Suliman Ad-Dharrath Arena, Benghazi
Attendance: 2,000

August 10
19:00

Report

Libya	75–73	Egypt
Scoring by quarter: 13-12, 27-16, 14-24, 21-21
Scoring by half: 40-28, 35-45
Pts: A. Belgasem 23; Rebs: H. Salem 9 Asts: R. Elhamali 3		Pts: A. Sherif 18; Rebs: W. Badr 7 Asts: W. Badr 3

Suliman Ad-Dharrath Arena, Benghazi
Attendance: 3,200

August 10
21:30

Report

Nigeria	74–70	Mali
Scoring by quarter: 20-16, 12-20, 19-20, 23-14
Scoring by half: 32-36, 42-34
Pts: C. Oguchi 13; Rebs: E. Ugboaja 9 Asts: J. Akognon 2		Pts: A. Sy 18; Rebs: A. Sy 8 Asts: A. Sy 4

Suliman Ad-Dharrath Arena, Benghazi

August 11
16:30

Report

Egypt	64–80	Ivory Coast
Scoring by quarter: 16-19, 16-17, 22-21, 10-23
Scoring by half: 32-36, 32-44
Pts: A. Fanan 18; Rebs: M. Mohamed 8 Asts: T. Moustafa 3		Pts: C. Abouo 15; Rebs: M. Kone 13; Asts: I. N'Diaye 4

Suliman Ad-Dharrath Arena, Benghazi
Attendance: 2,000

August 11
19:00

Report

Mali	95–73	Libya
Scoring by quarter: 13-17, 21-23, 36-8, 25-25
Scoring by half: 34-40, 61-33
Pts: W. Coulibaly 25; Rebs: K. Ouattara 11; Asts: L. Chelle 5		Pts: A. Belgasem 18; Rebs: H. Salem 11; Asts: A. Belgasem 4

Suliman Ad-Dharrath Arena, Benghazi
Attendance: 3,200

August 11
21:30

Report

Angola	93–85	Nigeria
Scoring by quarter: 24-18, 24-24, 20-23, 25-20
Scoring by half: 48-42, 45-48
Pts: E. Mingas 23; Rebs: J. Gomes 8 Asts: A. Costa 8		Pts: G. Muoneke 33; Rebs: G. Muoneke 7 Asts: E. Ere 3

Suliman Ad-Dharrath Arena, Benghazi
Attendance: 1,000

==== Group F ====
Unlike Group E, Group F was filled with back-and-forth matches between all six teams. Day 1 of the group saw plenty of action. Rwanda, making only its second tournament appearance, stunned 24-time participant Senegal, which had been undefeated in group play. Tunisia followed that up with a one-point victory over Central African Republic on Amine Rzig's jumper with four seconds left.

On Day 2, Central African Republic returned to form with a dominating 21-point victory over Rwanda. Senegal was upset yet again when Mouhammad Faye missed two free throws with three seconds left in a 75–73 loss to Morocco. Tunisia again won in dramatic fashion with a 68–66 victory over Cameroon when Parfait Bitee missed a 3-pointer at the buzzer.

Heading into Day 3, only Tunisia had clinched a quarterfinal spot. Senegal rebounded from two consecutive losses to beat Tunisia and steal first place in the group from the Tunisians. Despite losing to Rwanda, Cameroon finished third in the group. Central African Republic beat Morocco to claim the final quarterfinal spot.

Team	Pld	W	L	PF	PA	PD	Pts	Tie	
Senegal	6	4	2	449	414	+35	10	1–0	
Tunisia	6	4	2	433	421	+12	10	0–1	
Cameroon	6	3	3	429	396	+33	9	2–1	1–0
Central African Republic	6	3	3	492	435	+57	9	2–1	0–1
Morocco	6	3	3	452	499	-47	9	1–2	1–0
Rwanda	6	3	3	436	439	-3	9	1–2	0–1

August 9
16:30

Report

Morocco	54–80	Cameroon
Scoring by quarter: 8-23, 12-28, 17-16, 17-13
Scoring by half: 20-51, 34-29
Pts: Akinocho and Rhalimi 10 each Rebs: R. Rhalimi 6 Asts: M. Hachad 7		Pts: J. Ehawa 13; Rebs: A. Aboya 12; Asts: P. Bitee 4

African Union Arena, Tripoli

August 9
19:00

Report

Rwanda	72–59	Senegal
Scoring by quarter: 16-16, 18-7, 18-21, 20-15
Scoring by half: 34-23, 38-36
Pts: K. Gasana 18; Rebs: R. Thomson 8 Asts: M. Miller 5		Pts: B. Ndong 21; Rebs: B. Ndong 10; Asts: B. Ndong 3

African Union Arena, Tripoli

August 9
21:30

Report

Tunisia	76–75	Central African Republic
Scoring by quarter: 20-24, 19-12, 18-22, 19-17
Scoring by half: 39-36, 37-39
Pts: A. Rzig 18; Rebs: M. Hdidane 5 Asts: M. Hdidane 3		Pts: R. Sato 18; Rebs: R. Sato 9 Asts: D. Damachoua 2

African Union Arena, Tripoli

August 10
16:30

Report

Central African Republic	85–64	Rwanda
Scoring by quarter: 22-15, 16-16, 32-13, 15-20
Scoring by half: 38-31, 47-33
Pts: R. Sato 30; Rebs: R. Sato 10; Asts: Y. Zachee 4		Pts: C. Mugabo 14; Rebs: R. Thomson 8 Asts: 2 tied with 2

African Union Arena, Tripoli

August 10
19:00

Report

Senegal	73–75	Morocco
Scoring by quarter: 14-18, 20-14, 8-20, 31-23
Scoring by half: 34-32, 39-43
Pts: M. Faye 18; Rebs: B. Ndong 12; Asts: E. Pene 7		Pts: M. Hachad 18; Rebs: M. Hachad 13; Asts: M. Hachad 4

African Union Arena, Tripoli
Attendance: 1,500

August 10
21:30

Report

Cameroon	66–68	Tunisia
Scoring by quarter: 21-21, 11-18, 15-8, 19-21
Scoring by half: 32-39, 34-29
Pts: G. Essengue 14; Rebs: P. Bouli 6 Asts: 3 tied with 2		Pts: A. Rzig 17; Rebs: A. Rzig 6 Asts: M. Lahmar 3

African Union Arena, Tripoli

August 11
16:30

Report

Morocco	73–81	Central African Republic
Scoring by quarter: 16-26, 21-20, 15-18, 21-17
Scoring by half: 37-46, 36-35
Pts: Y. Idrissi 15; Rebs: M. Hachad 6 Asts: M. Hachad 6		Pts: R. Sato 25; Rebs: R. Sato 17; Asts: M. Kougere 3

African Union Arena, Tripoli

August 11
19:00

Report

Rwanda	82–69	Cameroon
Scoring by quarter: 9-18, 20-14, 18-9, 35-28
Scoring by half: 29-32, 53-37
Pts: K. Gasana 24; Rebs: R. Thomson 9 Asts: K. Gasana 6		Pts: H. Nana 12; Rebs: G. Essengue 8 Asts: J. Ehawa 5

African Union Arena, Tripoli

August 11
21:30

Report

Tunisia	65–73	Senegal
Scoring by quarter: 19-17, 15-15, 16-22, 15-19
Scoring by half: 34-32, 31-41
Pts: M. Hdidane 14; Rebs: H. Braa 7 Asts: M. Hdidane 3		Pts: B. Ndong 18; Rebs: B. Ndong 9 Asts: B. Cisse 8

African Union Arena, Tripoli

=== Knockout round ===
The knockout stage was a single-elimination tournament involving the eight teams that qualified by finishing in the top four of their group in the eighth final stage of the tournament. There were three rounds of matches, with each round eliminating half of the teams entering that round. The successive rounds were: quarter-finals, semi-finals, final. There was also a play-off to decide third/fourth place. Each finalist and the winner of the third place game would qualify for the 2010 FIBA World Championship.

Quarter-finals
Angola	84
Central African Republic	63
Mali	73
Tunisia	74
Nigeria	80
Cameroon	84
Ivory Coast	84
Senegal	78

Semi-finals
Angola	79
Tunisia	69
Cameroon	61
Ivory Coast	68

Final
Angola	82
Ivory Coast	72
Third place
Tunisia	83
Cameroon	68

==== Quarterfinals ====
In the first game of the quarterfinals, Angola closed the third quarter on a 23–6 run en route to an 84–63 victory after Central African Republic had tied the game at 43 early in the second half. The Angolans qualified for the semifinals for the 14th consecutive Afrobasket tournament. Tunisia won a thriller over Mali 74-73 when Mali star Amara Sy missed the second of two free throws with one second on the clock. In the third quarterfinal, Cameroon never trailed in the second half to stun Nigeria, whose only previous loss had come at the hands of Angola. Group E fourth-place finisher Côte d'Ivoire followed the previous game with a shocker of their own in beating Group F first place Senegal. The Ivorians dominated the beginning and end of the game after the team jumped out to a 16–2 first half lead and closed the game on a 16–6 run en route to a six-point victory.

August 13
14:00

Report

Angola	84–63	Central African Republic
Scoring by quarter: 30-21, 12-12, 24-16, 18-14
Scoring by half: 42-33, 42-30
Pts: J. Gomes 29; Rebs: J. Gomes 9 Asts: A. Costa 8		Pts: R. Sato 14; Rebs: R. Sato 8 Asts: R. Koundjia 2

African Union Arena, Tripoli

August 13
16:30

Report

Mali	73–74	Tunisia
Scoring by quarter: 15-15, 17-16, 17-20, 24-23
Scoring by half: 32-31, 41-43
Pts: A. Sy 21; Rebs: K. Ouattara 6 Asts: Chelle and Sy 4 each		Pts: A. Rzig 18; Rebs: S. Mejri 9 Asts: N. Knioua 4

African Union Arena, Tripoli

August 13
19:00

Report

Nigeria	80–84	Cameroon
Scoring by quarter: 23-26, 17-20, 16-20, 24-18
Scoring by half: 40-46, 40-38
Pts: M. Efevberha 24; Rebs: A. Akingbala 8 Asts: G. Muoneke 3		Pts: G. Essengue 17; Rebs: H. Nana 8 Asts: P. Bitee 7

African Union Arena, Tripoli

August 13
21:00

Report

Ivory Coast	84–78	Senegal
Scoring by quarter: 24-14, 24-22, 17-28, 19-14
Scoring by half: 48-36, 36-42
Pts: P. Amagou 15; Rebs: M. Kone 10; Asts: M. Diabate 6		Pts: M. Faye 22; Rebs: B. Ndong 9 Asts: B. Cisse 9

African Union Arena, Tripoli

==== Semifinals ====
In the semifinals, Tunisia hung with the powerhouse Angolans for much of the game. The Tunisians never trailed by more than eleven in the fourth quarter but could not cut the deficit lower than five en route to a ten-point loss. In a match-up between the two teams that pulled quarterfinal upsets, Côte d'Ivoire continued its Cinderella run with a victory over Cameroon. The Ivorians closed the game on an 8–0 run in the final two minutes to turn a 61–60 deficit into a 68–61 victory to qualify for the team's first FIBA Africa Championship final since 1985.

August 14
19:00

Report

Angola	79–69	Tunisia
Scoring by quarter: 16-13, 19-16, 21-17, 23-23
Scoring by half: 35-29, 44-40
Pts: J. Gomes 18; Rebs: E. Mingas 7 Asts: A. Costa 6		Pts: A. Rzig 19; Rebs: S. Mejri 7 Asts: M. Hdidane 3

African Union Arena, Tripoli

August 14
21:30

Report

Cameroon	61–68	Ivory Coast
Scoring by quarter: 13-11, 10-20, 24-15, 14-22
Scoring by half: 23-31, 38-37
Pts: C. Makanda 13; Rebs: G. Essengue 6 Asts: P. Bitee 4		Pts: D. Tape 15; Rebs: M. Kone 10; Asts: M. Diabate 6

African Union Arena, Tripoli

==== Third-place playoff ====
In a game that would decide the third and final African qualifier for the 2010 FIBA World Championship, Tunisia never trailed in winning the bronze medal game over Cameroon in dominating fashion. Tunisian star and All-Tournament First Team selection Amine Rzig scored a game-high 20 points.

August 15
17:30

Report

Tunisia	83–68	Cameroon
Scoring by quarter: 22-13, 18-18, 16-19, 27-18
Scoring by half: 40-31, 43-37
Pts: A. Rzig 20; Rebs: M. Ghyaza 5 Asts: A. Rzig 5		Pts: C. Makanda 18; Rebs: Y. Mekongo Mbala 8 Asts: P. Bitee 4

African Union Arena, Tripoli

==== Final ====
Angola won its sixth consecutive African championship after withstanding a valiant challenge from the upstart Côte d'Ivoire team. Côte d'Ivoire took a surprising one-point lead into the half and kept the game close through the second half as the eventual 10-point margin of victory matched Angola's biggest lead in the game.

August 15
20:00

Report

Angola	82–72	Ivory Coast
Scoring by quarter: 15-19, 19-16, 24-19, 24-18
Scoring by half: 34-35, 48-37
Pts: C. Morais 21; Rebs: J. Gomes 16; Asts: A. Costa 4		Pts: P. Amagou 18; Rebs: M. Kone 7 Asts: P. Amagou 4

African Union Arena, Tripoli

=== Classification round ===
==== 5th-8th places ====
In the consolation bracket for quarterfinal losers, Central African Republic continued its strong run in the tournament following an 0–2 start in beating Mali 80-74. In a match-up that most expected would take place in the semifinals, Nigeria regained its preliminary round form in dismantling Senegal in the second game.

Nigeria grabbed fifth place over the Central Africans in an uneventful game. Senegal defeated Mali in the seventh place game to end a disappointing tournament with a 5–4 record after starting the tournament 3–0.

Semi-finals
Central African Republic	80
Mali	74
Nigeria	76
Senegal	58

Fifth place
Central African Republic	71
Nigeria	80
Seventh place
Mali	63
Senegal	74

August 14
14:00

Report

Central African Republic	80–74	Mali
Scoring by quarter: 20-18, 8-17, 13-18, 39-21
Scoring by half: 28-35, 52-39
Pts: M. Kougere 30; Rebs: R. Koundjia 9 Asts: R. Koundjia 4		Pts: A. Sy 17; Rebs: A. Sy 6 Asts: A. Sy 3

African Union Arena, Tripoli

August 14
19:00

Report

Nigeria	76–58	Senegal
Scoring by quarter: 16-19, 28-12, 15-9, 17-18
Scoring by half: 44-31, 32-27
Pts: C. Oguchi 17; Rebs: E. Ugboaja 9 Asts: E. Ugboaja 4		Pts: M. Faye 16; Rebs: P. Sow 10; Asts: B. Cisse 4

African Union Arena, Tripoli

August 15
12:30

Report

Mali	63–74	Senegal
Scoring by quarter: 13-26, 17-12, 17-20, 16-16
Scoring by half: 30-38, 33-36
Pts: A. Sy 22; Rebs: L. Chelle 8 Asts: A. Sy 4		Pts: M. Faye 16; Rebs: P. Sow 15; Asts: E. Pene 4

African Union Arena, Tripoli

August 15
15:00

Report

Central African Republic	71–80	Nigeria
Scoring by quarter: 15-24, 18-23, 16-18, 22-15
Scoring by half: 33-47, 38-33
Pts: L. Bomayako 21; Rebs: D. Damachoua 9 Asts: Y. Zachee 6		Pts: M. Efevberha 18; Rebs: A. Akingbala 8 Asts: J. Obazuaye 4

African Union Arena, Tripoli

==== 9th-12th places ====
In the consolation bracket for eighth final losers, surprising Rwanda continued its strong run in its second ever Afrobasket tournament by finishing ninth and improving on last year's twelve place finish. Egypt finished tenth with a 2–6 record, by far its worst performance in a FIBA Africa Championship. The host Libyans finished in a strong eleventh place for a team making its first appearance in an Afrobasket tournament since 1978 on the strength of Hesham Ali Salem's 25-point, 14-rebound performance in the eleventh place game.

Semi-finals
Morocco	62
Egypt	88
Libya	77
Rwanda	80

Ninth place
Egypt	75
Rwanda	78
Eleventh place
Morocco	76
Libya	80

August 13
16:30

Report

Egypt	88–62	Morocco
Scoring by quarter: 21-17, 24-8, 16-18, 27-19
Scoring by half: 45-25, 43-37
Pts: A. Fanan 23; Rebs: M. Khorshid 10; Asts: T. Moustafa 5		Pts: S. Rafai 14; Rebs: M. Houari 5 Asts: A. Najah 2

Suliman Ad-Dharrath Arena, Benghazi

August 13
19:00

Report

Libya	77–80	Rwanda
Scoring by quarter: 25-18, 18-22, 19-23, 15-17
Scoring by half: 43-40, 34-40
Pts: M. Mrsal 24; Rebs: H. Salem 11; Asts: M. Youssef 7		Pts: K. Gasana 24; Rebs: R. Thomson 12; Asts: R. Thomson 2

Suliman Ad-Dharrath Arena, Benghazi

August 14
16:30

Report

Rwanda	78–75	Egypt
Scoring by quarter: 27-22, 12-19, 23-22, 16-12
Scoring by half: 39-41, 39-34
Pts: R. Thomson 19; Rebs: R. Thomson 14; Asts: K. Gasana 6		Pts: W. Badr 17; Rebs: M. Khorshid 10; Asts: W. Badr 4

Suliman Ad-Dharrath Arena, Benghazi

August 14
19:00

Report

Libya	80–76	Morocco
Scoring by quarter: 23-18, 19-20, 23-15, 15-23
Scoring by half: 42-38, 38-38
Pts: H. Salem 25; Rebs: H. Salem 14; Asts: Mrsal and Ben Elhaj 6 each		Pts: Y. Idrissi 18; Rebs: A. Najah 8 Asts: Z. El Masbahi 6

Suliman Ad-Dharrath Arena, Benghazi

==== 13th–16th places ====
In the consolation bracket for opening round losers, Cape Verde finally showed the form that won them the bronze medal at the FIBA Africa Championship 2007 in destroying Congo and Mozambique by 37 and 33 points, respectively. Against Congo, Cape Verde star Jeff Xavier scored a tournament-high 38 points. Mozambique slipped by South Africa 69–67 to grab its only win of the tournament en route to a 14th-place finish. In the 15th-place game, South Africa claimed its only victory of the tournament and sent the over-matched Congo team home winless.

Semi-finals
South Africa	67
Mozambique	69
Congo	63
Cape Verde	100

Thirteenth place
Mozambique	61
Cape Verde	94
Fifteenth place
South Africa	81
Congo	65

August 9
11:30

Report

South Africa	67–69	Mozambique
Scoring by quarter: 5-17, 19-17, 23-18, 20-17
Scoring by half: 24-34, 43-35
Pts: N. Mothiba 20; Rebs: C. Gabriel 17; Asts: K. Letsebe 2		Pts: O. Magoliço 17; Rebs: O. Magoliço 9 Asts: G. Novela 3

African Union Arena, Tripoli

August 9
14:00

Report

Congo	63–100	Cape Verde
Scoring by quarter: 15-19, 12-14, 10-33, 26-34
Scoring by half: 27-33, 36-67
Pts: J. Koumba 18; Rebs: R. Kondzy 8 Asts: B. Dibessa 4		Pts: J. Xavier 38; Rebs: R. Mascarenhas 9 Asts: J. Xavier 5

African Union Arena, Tripoli

August 10
11:30

Report

South Africa	81–65	Congo
Scoring by quarter: 19-16, 26-5, 18-24, 18-20
Scoring by half: 45-21, 36-44
Pts: K. Letsebe 17; Rebs: N. Mothiba 9 Asts: K. Letsebe 5		Pts: B. Dibessa 19; Rebs: C. Djio 8 Asts: B. Dibessa 4

African Union Arena, Tripoli

August 10
14:00

Report

Mozambique	61–94	Cape Verde
Scoring by quarter: 17-21, 18-20, 7-35, 19-18
Scoring by half: 35-41, 26-53
Pts: C. Muchate 16; Rebs: C. Muchate 9 Asts: L. Barros 2		Pts: J. Xavier 27; Rebs: M. Neves 11; Asts: J. Xavier 5

African Union Arena, Tripoli

== Final standings ==
Qualified for 2010 FIBA World Championships

Rank	Team	Record
1	Angola	9–0
2	Ivory Coast	5–4
3	Tunisia	6–3
4	Cameroon	4–5
5	Nigeria	7–2
6	Central African Republic	4–5
7	Senegal	5–4
8	Mali	4–5
9	Rwanda	5–3
10	Egypt	2–6
11	Libya	3–5
12	Morocco	3–5
13	Cape Verde	3–2
14	Mozambique	1–4
15	South Africa	1–4
16	Congo	0–5

1st	2nd	3rd
Angola Olimpio Cipriano; Armando Costa; Carlos Morais; Domingos Bonifacio; Luis Costa; Leonel Paulo; Joaquim Gomes; Adolfo Quimbamba; Felizardo Ambrosio; Carlos Almeida; Filipe Abraao; Eduardo Mingas; Coach: Luís Magalhães	Ivory Coast Pape-Philippe Amagou; Errick Craven; Charles-Noe Abouo; Issife Soumahoro; Kinidinnin Konate; Mouloukou Diabate; Ismael N'Diaye; Wilfrid Aka; Jonathan Kale; Didier Eric Tape; Namori Meite; Mohamed Kone; Coach: Randoald Dessarzin	Tunisia Mokhtar Ghyaza; Marouen Lahmar; Nizar Knioua; Naim Dhifallah; Marouan Kechrid; Mohamed Hdidane; Atef Maoua; Makrem Ben Romdhane; Anis Hedidane; Amine Rzig; Hamdi Braa; Salah Mejri; Coach: Adel Tlatli

== Awards ==
FIBA Africa Championship 2009 winners

Angola
Tenth title

Most Valuable Player
(Angola) Joaquim Gomes "Kikas"

== Statistical leaders ==
=== Individual Tournament Highs ===
Points

Pos.	Name	PPG
1	(Cape Verde) Jeff Xavier	27.2
2	(Central African Republic) Romain Sato	21.6
3	(Republic of the Congo) Jean Koumba	19.5
4	(Senegal) Boniface Ndong	19
5	(Rwanda) Kenny Gasana	18.3
6	(Nigeria) Michael Efevberha	17.4
7	(Senegal) Mouhammad Faye	17.3
8	(Tunisia) Amine Rzig	16.4
9	(Morocco) Zakaria El Masbahi	15.9
10	(Mali) Amara Sy	15.6

Rebounds

Pos.	Name	RPG
1	(Rwanda) Robert Thomson	11.4
2	(Libya) Hesham Ali Salem	10.8
3	(Senegal) DeSagana Diop	9.1
3	(Senegal) Boniface Ndong	9.1
5	(Central African Republic) Romain Sato	8.6
6	(Ivory Coast) Mohamed Kone	8.3
7	(Cape Verde) Rodrigo Mascarenhas	8.2
8	(Cape Verde) Pedro Cipriano	8.0
9	(Republic of the Congo) Jean Koumba	7.5
10	(Angola) Joaquim Gomes	7.2

Assists

Pos.	Name	APG
1	(Senegal) Babacar Cisse	6.6
2	(Morocco) Mohamad Hachad	5.3
3	(Angola) Armando Costa	4.7
4	(Ivory Coast) Mouloukou Diabate	3.9
4	(Rwanda) Kenny Gasana	3.9
6	(Mali) Amara Sy	3.4
7	(Mali) Ludovic Chelle	3.2
7	(Cape Verde) Jeff Xavier	3.2
9	(Egypt) Wael Badr	3.1
10	(Cameroon) Parfait Bitee	3.0

Steals

Pos.	Name	SPG
1	(Morocco) Mohamad Hachad	3.5
2	(Cape Verde) Jeff Xavier	2.8
3	(Republic of the Congo) Romaric Kondzy	2.3
4	(South Africa) Neo Mothiba	2.2
5	(Ivory Coast) Mouloukou Diabate	2.0
5	(Ivory Coast) Errick Craven	2.0
5	(Nigeria) Michael Efevberha	2.0
5	(Morocco) Zakaria El Masbahi	2.0
5	(Rwanda) Carlos Mugabo	2.0
5	(Republic of the Congo) Bertrand Dibessa	2.0

Blocks

Pos.	Name	BPG
1	(Morocco) Younes Idrissi	1.8
2	(Republic of the Congo) Luc Tselan Tsiene Etou	1.7
3	(Cameroon) Ruben Boumtje B.	1.6
3	(Morocco) Abderrahim Najah	1.6
3	(Senegal) Boniface Ndong	1.6
3	(Rwanda) Ellis Kayijuka	1.6
7	(Rwanda) Robert Thomson	1.5
8	(Cape Verde) Rodrigo Mascarenhas	1.4
9	(Senegal) DeSagana Diop	1.3
9	(Tunisia) Salah Mejri	1.3

Minutes

Pos.	Name	MPG
1	(Rwanda) Robert Thomson	38.8
2	(Tunisia) Amine Rzig	36.4
3	(Rwanda) Matthew Miller	35.8
4	(Republic of the Congo) Jean Koumba	35.5
5	(Rwanda) Kenny Gasana	35.4
5	(Republic of the Congo) Bertrand Dibessa	35.4
7	(Libya) Mohamed Mrsal	34.5
8	(Cape Verde) Jeff Xavier	34.4
9	(Morocco) Mohamad Hachad	34.2
10	(Cape Verde) Mario Correia	33.8

=== Individual Game highs ===
Department	Name	Total	Opponent
Points	(Cape Verde) Jeff Xavier	38	Congo
Rebounds	(Rwanda) Robert Thomson	18	Tunisia
Assists	(Senegal) Babacar Cisse	10	Congo
Steals	(Ivory Coast) Mouloukou Diabate (Cape Verde) Jeff Xavier	7	South Africa; Congo
Blocks	8 tied with 4		
Field goal percentage	(Angola) Joaquim Gomes	100% (12/12)	Mali
3-point field goal percentage	(Angola) Eduardo Mingas	100% (4/4)	Nigeria
Free throw percentage	(Central African Republic) Romain Sato	100% (10/10)	Rwanda
Turnovers	(Mali) Amara Sy	9	Ivory Coast

=== Team Tournament Highs ===
Offensive PPG

Pos.	Name	PPG
1	Nigeria	85.4
2	Angola	85.3
3	Cape Verde	83
4	Central African Republic	78.4
5	Ivory Coast	74.9

Defensive PPG

Pos.	Name	PPG
1	Angola	66.8
2	Cape Verde	67.8
3	Mali	68.1
4	Cameroon	69.7
5	Senegal	70.8

Rebounds

Pos.	Name	RPG
1	Senegal	43.1
2	Cape Verde	42
3	Nigeria	38.7
4	South Africa	36.6
5	Rwanda	36.4

Assists

Pos.	Name	APG
1	Senegal	16.3
1	Angola	16.3
3	Cape Verde	14.8
4	Tunisia	13
5	Cameroon	12.9

Steals

Pos.	Name	SPG
1	Congo	12.4
2	Ivory Coast	11.4
3	Cape Verde	11
4	Mozambique	10.6
5	Angola	10

Blocks

Pos.	Name	BPG
1	Morocco	4.2
1	Senegal	4.2
3	Cameroon	3
4	Rwanda	2.8
4	Cape Verde	2.8

=== Team Game highs ===
Department	Name	Total	Opponent
Points	Central African Republic	113	Congo
Rebounds	Senegal	55	Congo
Assists	Central African Republic; Mali	24	Congo; Libya
Steals	Angola; Ivory Coast; Nigeria	18	Libya; South Africa; Cameroon
Blocks	Senegal	9	Congo
Field goal percentage	Egypt	60.9%	Mozambique
3-point field goal percentage	Libya	83.3%	Egypt
Free throw percentage	Cameroon	91.7%	Tunisia
Turnovers	South Africa	31	Ivory Coast

== All-Tournament Teams ==
The following players were voted to the All-Tournament teams by journalists and experts in attendance at the tournament:

=== First team ===
(Ivory Coast) Pape-Philippe Amagou
(Senegal) DeSagana Diop
(Angola) Joaquim Gomes (Tournament MVP)
(Tunisia) Amine Rzig
(Central African Republic) Romain Sato

=== Second Team ===
(Angola) Eduardo Mingas
(Angola) Carlos Morais
(Senegal) Boniface Ndong
(Libya) Hesham Ali Salem
(Cape Verde) Jeff Xavier

=== Third Team ===
(Senegal) Babacar Cisse
(Angola) Armando Costa
(Nigeria) Michael Efevberha
(Cameroon) Gaston Essengue
(Senegal) Mouhammad Faye
(Rwanda) Robert Thomson

== See also ==
- 2009 FIBA Africa Clubs Champions Cup
