= Matthew Miller (basketball) =

American-Rwandan basketball player

Matthew Miller (born December 11, 1982) is an American basketball player with a Rwandan passport who played for the Rwanda national basketball team at the 2007 and 2009 FIBA Africa Championship.

Born in Aurora, Illinois, Miller is an American native who played college basketball at Bellarmine University. Miller is one of several players accused of being a mercenary for the Rwanda national basketball team as the country with little basketball tradition has become one of the top teams in Africa. Miller, along with Robert Thomson was the subject of some controversy at the 2009 FIBA Africa Championship when opponent Morocco nearly refused to play in an opening round match after accusing the two of being mercenaries for Rwanda, despite the fact that both had played with Rwanda as far back as 2007. Despite this setback, Miller was one of the top players for Rwanda at the tournament, averaging 13.2 PPG for the team.
