= Amro Sherif =

Egyptian basketball player

Amro Sherif (born 14 June 1991 in Cairo, Egypt) is an Egyptian basketball player currently playing for Al Gezira of the Egyptian Super League. He is a member of the Egypt national basketball team.

Sherif participated with the senior Egypt national basketball team for the first time at the 2009 FIBA Africa Championship. The 18-year-old saw action off the bench for the team, scoring a team-leading 18 points in an eighth final loss to Libya He also competed for Egypt at the FIBA Under-19 World Championship 2009 after helping the team win the 2008 FIBA Africa U-18 Championship. His 21.8 points per game led all scorers at the U-18 Africa Championship and his 19 points per game made him the fourth highest scorer at the FIBA Under-19 World Championship 2009.
