= Mohamed Youssef Ben Elhaj =

Libyan basketball player (born 1985)

Mohamed Ben Elhaj
Libya national basketball

Personal information
- Born: 25 July 1985

Mohamed Youssef Ben Elhaj (born July 25, 1985) is a Libyan basketball player. He was a member of the Libya national basketball team at the FIBA Africa Championship 2009.

== Career ==
Ben Elhaj averaged 1.6 points per game and 2.3 assists per game off the bench for the eleventh place Libyans at the tournament. He tallied a game high five assists in the first round Libyan victory over South Africa that sent the Libyans into the eighth finals. He also tied Mohamed Mrsal with six assists in the eleventh place game, a Libyan victory over Morocco.
