= Amandine =

Amandine may refer to:

- Edibles:
  - Amandine (cake), a Romanian chocolate sponge cake filled with chocolate or almond cream
  - Amandine (garnish), a French culinary term for a garnish of almonds
  - Amandine potato, a type of potato
- Amandine (band), a Swedish musical band
- Amandine (given name)
- Amandine (ship, 1962), a Belgian museum ship

== See also ==
- Almandine, a type of garnet
- Amandin (disambiguation)
