= Samir Adam =

Mozambique basketball player (born 1983)

Samir Adam (born 5 December 1983) is a Mozambique basketball player currently with Fundacion Adepal Alcazar of the Spanish Professional Basketball League. He is also a member of the Mozambique national basketball team and appeared with the club at the 2009 African Championships.
