= Tamer Moustafa =

Egyptian basketball player

Tamer Moustafa (born July 5, 1982) is an Egyptian basketball player currently playing for El Geish of the Egyptian Super League. He is a member of the Egypt national basketball team.

Moustafa participated with the Egypt national basketball team at the 2009 FIBA Africa Championship. Gunady started and averaged 7.2 points per game and 1.2 assists per game for the 2009 Egypt team that finished in tenth place. This was Egypt's lowest place in nineteen appearances.
