= Namori Meite =

French-born Ivorian basketball player

ALM Évreux Basket
- Position: Forward
- League: French League

Personal information
- Born: February 25, 1988 (age 38) Paris, France
- Listed height: 6 ft 5 in (1.96 m)

Career information
- Playing career: 2007–present

Career history
- Paris-Levallois Basket

Namori Meite (born February 25, 1988, in Paris) is a French-born Côte d'Ivoirean basketball player currently playing for ALM Évreux Basket of the French Ligue Nationale de Basketball Division B. He is also a member of the Côte d'Ivoire national basketball team.

Meite competed as a member of the Côte d'Ivoire national basketball team for the first time at the 2009 FIBA Africa Championship. He saw action in all nine games for the Ivorians, who won the silver medal to qualify for the 2010 FIBA World Championship.
