= Cyrille Makanda =

Cameroonian-Russian basketball player

Personal information
- Born: 5 May 1980 (age 46) Douala, Cameroon
- Listed height: 1.95 m (6 ft 5 in)

Career information
- NBA draft: 2002: undrafted
- Playing career: 1996–2014
- Position: Guard

Career history
- 1996–1999: Dreams Douala
- 1999–2000: Avtodor Saratov
- 2000–2001: Arsenal Tula
- 2001–2002: Khimik Engels
- 2002–2003: Avtodor Saratov
- 2003–2005: Karlsruhe
- 2005: Élan Béarnais Pau-Orthez
- 2005–2006: Racing Paris
- 2006–2007: Keravnos
- 2007–2008: Krasnye Krylia
- 2008–2010: APOEL
- 2010–2011: Apollon Limassol
- 2011–2012: AEK Larnaca
- 2012–2013: APOEL
- 2014: Kapshagay

Cirill Makanda-Etogo (born 5 May 1980) is a Cameroonian-Russian former professional basketball player. Throughout his ten-year professional career, he has played for four teams in Russia, plus teams in Germany and France before joining APOEL B.C. in Cyprus for the 2008–09 season.

Makanda represents Cameroon internationally and competed for Cameroon at FIBA World Olympic Qualifying Tournament for Men 2008 and FIBA Africa Championship 2009. He was the leading scorer for Cameroon in the semifinals and bronze medal game, but the team lost both games to fall just short of qualifying for the 2010 FIBA World Championship.
