= Srđan Antić =

Serbian basketball coach

Personal information
- Born: 10 December 1960 (age 65) Belgrade, FPR Yugoslavia
- Coaching career: 1981–present

Career history

Coaching
- 1981–1982: Voždovac (youth)
- 1982–1988: Partizan (women's team)
- 1988–1991: Voždovac
- 1994–1997: Stadium Casablanca (women's)
- 1997: Cajalon Zaragoza (women's)
- 1997–1998: FC Porto (women's team)
- 1998–2000: Crvena zvezda (women's team)
- 2000: Vojvodina NIS
- 2005–2006: Al-Ittihad Tripoli
- 2007–2008: Libya
- 2008: Al-Nasr Benghazi
- 2008–2009: Al Naser Dubai
- 2009–2010: Al-Ahli Jeddah
- 2010–2011: Al Madena Tripoli
- 2010–2011: Libya
- 2011–2012: Al Wasl Dubai
- 2013–2014: Jászberényi
- 2016: Iraq

Career highlights
- Saudi Cup winner: 2010

Srđan "Riki" Antić (Serbian Cyrillic: Срђан "Рики" Антић; born 10 December 1960) is a Serbian professional basketball coach.

== Early life ==
Antić played basketball in Partizan Belgrade, but unfortunately his career as a basketball player ended, due to an injury, before he was able to join the senior team.

== Coaching career ==
Antić’s coaching career started in 1981 as the junior team assistant coach in club Voždovac in Belgrade. The following season he moved to the Partizan women's team, with whom he won three Yugoslav League championships (in 1984, 1985 and 1986), two Yugoslav Women's Basketball Cups (in 1985 and 1986), also as the head coach of the Partizan U-16 team, he won first Yugoslav Cadet Championship in the club’s history.

In 2000, he had a stint in the newly formed Vojvodina NIS of the YUBA League.

Antić worked in Libya, United Arab Emirates and Saudi Arabia for several years. In Libya he served as the head coach of three teams of the Libyan Division I League (Al Ittihad Tripoli, Al Nasr Benghazi and Al Madena Tripoli) as well as of the Libyan national team. In Dubai, he coached the Al Naser and the Al Wasl of the UAE League for one season each. He was awarded the title "The Best Coach" at the Dubai International Tournament (2008). During 2009–10 season, he coached the Al-Ahli Jeddah of the Saudi Premier League and won the Saudi Arabia Prince Faisal bin Fahad Cup.

In 2013, Antić become the head coach for the Jászberényi of the Hungarian League. In 2016, he was the head coach of the Iraq national team and placed 4th at the 2016 FIBA Asia Challenge in Iran.
