= Suliman Ad-Dharrath Arena =

Sports venue in Benghazi, Libya

Coordinates: 32°6′15″N 20°4′24″E

- Interactive map of Suliman Ad-Dharrath Arena
- Location: Benghazi, Libya
- Capacity: 2,000

Construction
- Opened: 1967; 59 years ago

Suliman Ad-Dharrath Arena is an indoor sporting arena located in Benghazi, Libya. It is used mainly for indoor sports such as volleyball and basketball. It has a seating capacity of 2,000 people and was opened in 1967. Currently, the capacity is 10,000.

It was one of two host arenas for the 2009 African Basketball Championship.
