= Karim Ouattara =

Malian-French basketball player

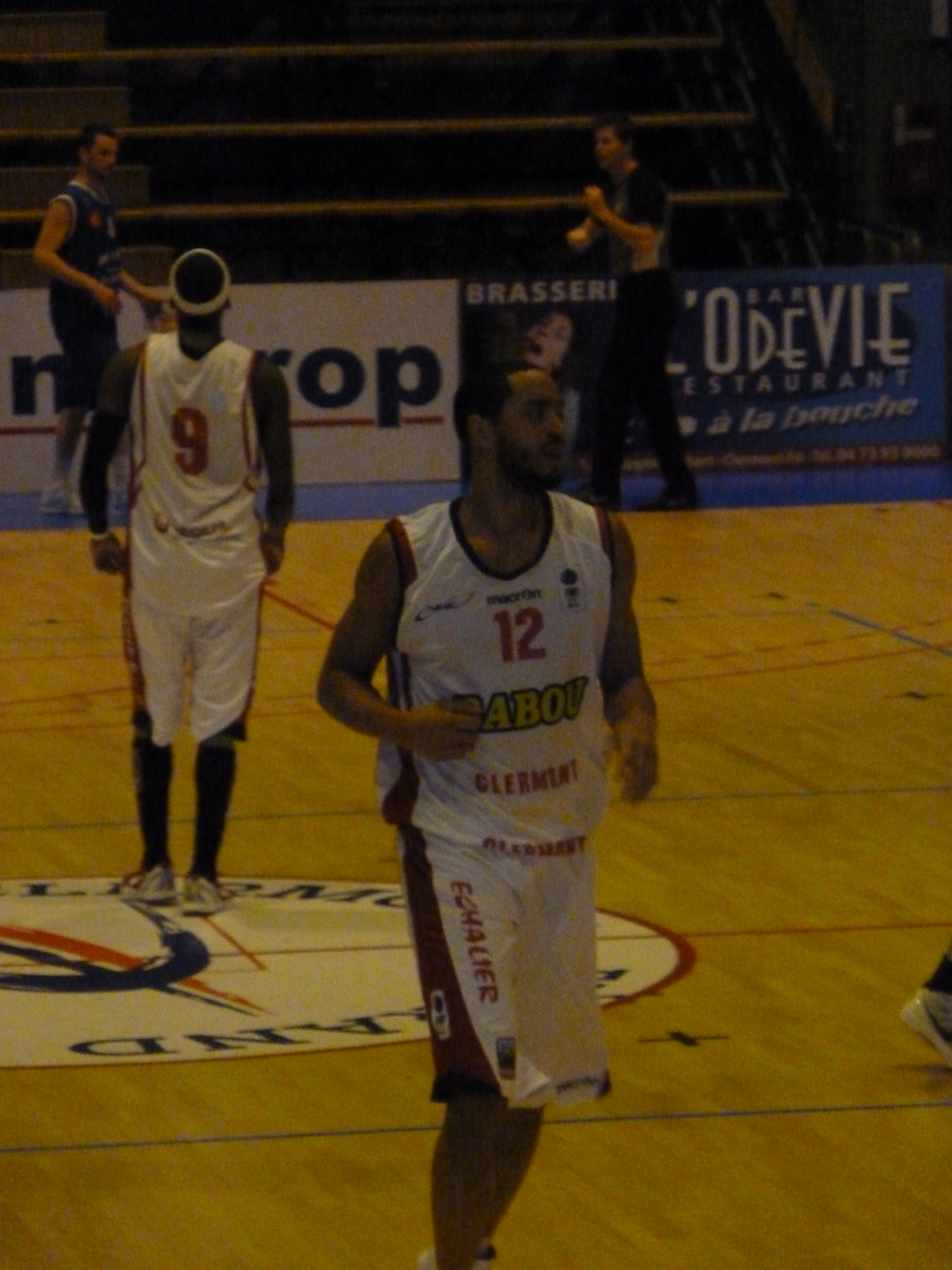
- Karim Ouattara, is a Malian-French basketball player.

Personal information
- Born: October 13, 1979 (age 47) Paris, France
- Listed height: 6 ft 7 in (2.01 m)
- Listed weight: 224 lb (102 kg)

Career information
- College: Albany (1998–2002)
- NBA draft: 2002: undrafted
- Playing career: 2002–2011
- Position: Forward

Career history
- 2002-2003: Rodez
- 2003-2005: Nantes
- 2005-2006: Champagne Basket
- 2006-2007: JL Bourg-en-Bresse
- 2007-2008: Nanterre 92
- 2008-2011: Stade Clermontois BA

Karim Ouattara (born October 13, 1979) is a Malian-French basketball player, formally for Stade Clermontois BA.

== Career ==
Ouattara played four years of NCAA Division I Basketball with the Albany Great Danes. He was largely a role player in his four years there, averaging 3.1 PPG and 4 RPG in his senior season as the captain of the team. He previously played for JL Bourg-en-Bresse of the French League joining Stade Clermontois BA starting with the 2007–08 season. He has provided help off the bench for the team, averaging 4.1 PPG and 3.2 RPG in 19 minutes per game in the 2008–09 season.

Ouattara plays for the Mali national basketball team in international competitions. He competed with the team at the 2005 and 2009 FIBA Africa Championship, helping the team to quarterfinal appearances in both tournaments.
