= Hervé Assoua-Wande =

Republic of the Congo basketball player

Hervé Assoua-Wandé
Personal information
- Born: February 16, 1982 Republic of the Congo

Herve Assoua-Wande (born 16 February 1982) is a basketball player from the Republic of the Congo. He competed with the Republic of the Congo national basketball team at the 2009 African Championship, where he scored 11.4 points per game and grabbed 4 rebounds, for the team. Nevertheless, the team struggled to a 16th-place finish in its first African Championship since 1985.
