= Eslam El Karbal =

Libyan basketball player (born 1983)

Eslam Ibrahim El Karbal (born 21 May 1983) is a Libyan basketball player for the sports club Al-Shabab. Born in Derna Libya, he also played for the Libya national basketball team.
