= Christ Silas Djio =

Republic of the Congo basketball player

Christ Silas Djio (born 12 December 1988) is a basketball player from the Republic of the Congo. He competed with the Republic of the Congo national basketball team at the 2009 African Championship, where he scored 5.5 points per game and grabbed 6 rebounds per game. He also competed with the team at the 2006 FIBA Africa U18 Championship for Men.
