= Wael Badr =

Egyptian basketball player

Wael Badr وائل بدر
Zamalek
- Title: Head coach
- League: Egyptian Basketball Premier League

Personal information
- Born: 1 December 1978 (age 47) Mit Okba, Giza, Egypt
- Listed height: 1.93 m (6 ft 4 in)
- Position: Guard
- Number: 7
- Coaching career: 2015–present

Career history

Playing
- Zamalek
- 2009–2012: Gezira
- 2012–2015: Sporting Alexandria

Coaching
- 2023–present: Zamalek

Career highlights
- 3× Egyptian League champion (2011, 2013, 2015); Egyptian League MVP (2009)
Medals
Men's basketball
Representing Egypt
FIBA AfroBasket
Silver medal – second place	2013 Abidjan

Wael Badr (Arabic: وائل بدر; born 1 December 1978) is an Egyptian former basketball player and current coach. He is the current head coach of Zamalek in the Egyptian Basketball Premier League. Badr is a former player of the Egypt national basketball team.

== Club career ==
Badr began his career with Zamalek, and later signed with Gezira for the 2009–10 season. He played his final three seasons for Sporting Alexandria.

== National team career ==
Badr played with the Egypt national basketball team and participated at FIBA AfroBasket in 2007, 2009 and 2013. Badr averaged 10.6 PPG and 3.1 APG as one of the few consistent performers on the 2009 Egypt team that finished a disappointing tenth place; this was Egypt's worst ever finish in 19 appearances at the tournament and had some fans calling for a complete dismantling of the team. He also played in the 2014 FIBA Basketball World Cup, his last tournament before retiring from national team duty.

== Coaching career ==
Badr became the head coach of Zamalek in December 2023, replacing Ahmed Marei who was sacked.
