= Ludovic Chelle =

French–Malian basketball player

Personal information
- Born: 3 January 1983 (age 43) Toulouse, France
- Listed height: 6 ft 2 in (1.88 m)

Career information
- Playing career: 2001–2024
- Position: Shooting guard

Career history
- 2001-2002: Olympique Antibes
- 2002-2004: Paris Basket Racing
- 2004-2006: Chorale Roanne Basket
- 2006-2009: JL Bourg-en-Bresse
- 2009-2010: Hermine Nantes
- 2010-2011: ALM Évreux Basket
- 2011-2013: Rouen
- 2013-2016: HTV Basket
- 2016-2018: Caen
- 2018-2020: Saint-Vallier
- 2021: UB Chartres Métropole
- 2021-2024: Pont-de-Chéruy
Medals
Men's basketball
Representing France
FIBA Europe Under-20 Championship
Bronze medal – third place	2002 Lithuania	U-20 Team

Ludovic Chelle (born 3 January 1983) is a French and Malian former basketball player.

Chelle has predominantly been a role player coming off the bench in his time in the French league. After signing in 2001 with Olympique Antibes, Chelle has played for four teams in the league. His best season came with Chorale Roanne Basket in 2005, averaging 8.9 points per game in 34 games. He also participated in the FIBA EuroCup with Paris Basket Racing in 2004.

Chelle averaged 11.1 PPG during the 2009 FIBA Africa Championship in helping Mali to an eighth-place finish in the tournament.
