= Wilfrid Aka =

French-born Ivorian basketball player

JSA Bordeaux
- Position: Shooting guard
- League: NM2

Personal information
- Born: 16 June 1979 (age 47) Paris, France
- Listed height: 6 ft 3.7 in (1.92 m)

Career information
- NBA draft: 2001: undrafted
- Playing career: 1997–present

Career history
- 1997–2000: Levallois SCB
- 2000–2001: ALM Évreux
- 2001–2002: Chorale Roanne
- 2002: STB Le Havre
- 2002–2003: Saint-Étienne
- 2003–2004: ALM Évreux
- 2004–2007: Orléans Loiret
- 2007–2011: Paris-Levallois
- 2011–2012: JA Vichy
- 2012–2014: ADA Blois
- 2016–present: JSA Bordeaux

Wilfrid Aka (born 16 June 1979) is a French-born Ivorian professional basketball player for JSA Bordeaux. He is also a member of the Côte d'Ivoire national basketball team.

Aka has spent his entire career playing for teams in the French Ligue Nationale de Basketball. Aka joined his most recent team, Paris-Levallois Basket, before the 2008-09 season. He helped the team, which had just suffered relegation the year before, return to the top-tier of French basketball by winning the B Division of the League. He averaged 2.3 points per game and saw action in 26 games off the bench for the team. He returned to the team for the 2009-10 season.

Aka competed as a member of the Côte d'Ivoire national basketball team for the first time at the 2009 FIBA Africa Championship. He saw action in all nine games for the Ivorians, who won the silver medal to qualify for the 2010 FIBA World Championship.
