= Algert Gjonaj =

Albanian basketball player (born 1987)

Personal information
- Born: 18 October 1987 (age 39) Burrel, Albania
- Listed height: 6 ft 6 in (1.98 m)

Career information
- Playing career: 200?–present
- Position: Small forward

Career history
- 200?–2016: Tirana
- 2016–2018: Vllaznia
- 2018–2019: Partizani Tirana
- 2019–2021: Teuta Durrës

Algert Gjonaj (born 18 October 1987) is an Albanian former professional basketball player who last played in the Albanian Basketball Superliga as well as for the Albanian national team.
