= Amandine potato =

Potato cultivar

Potato 'Amandine'
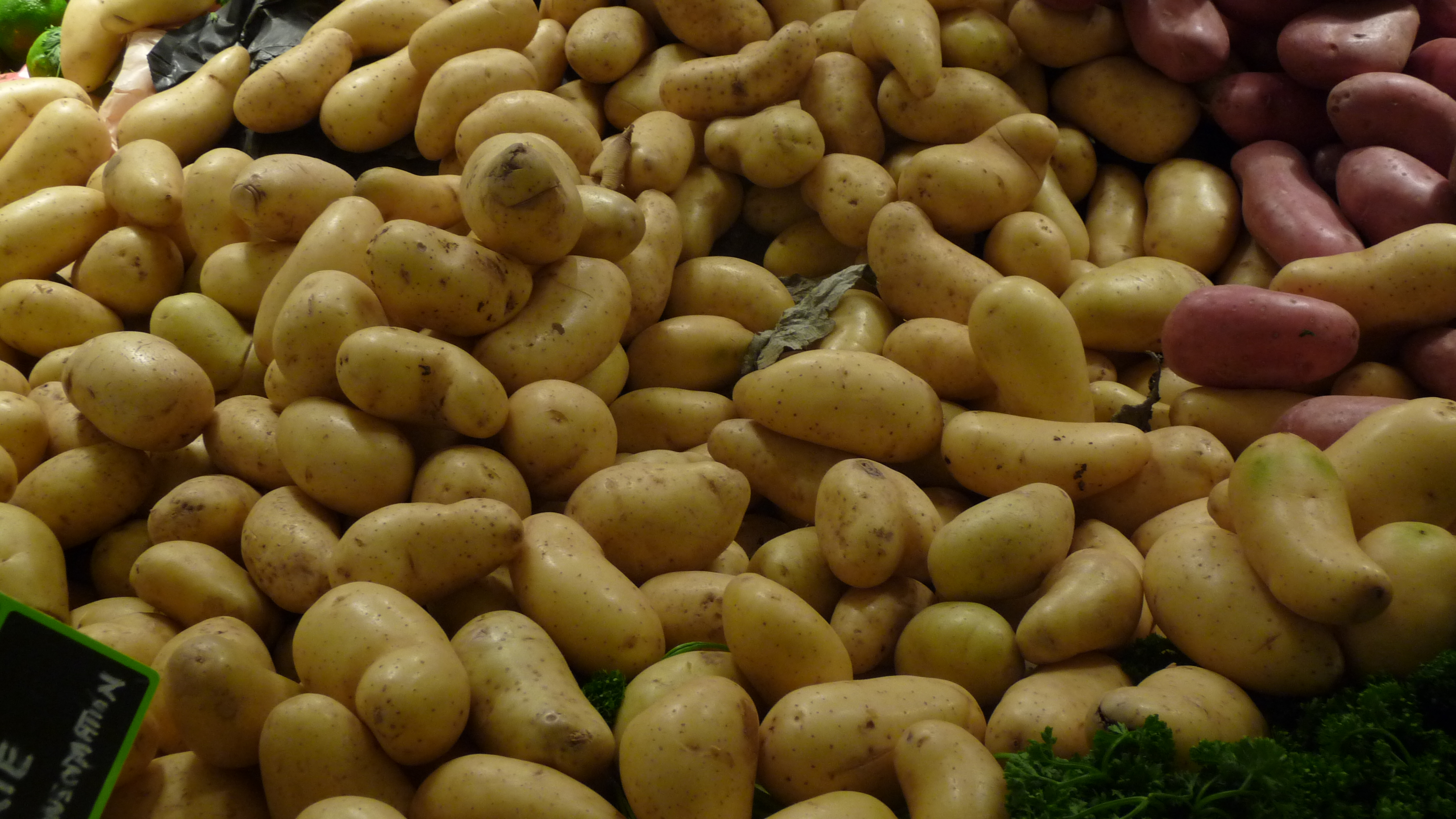
- 'Amandine' potatoes
- Species: Solanum tuberosum
- Hybrid parentage: 'Charlotte' and 'Mariana' varieties
- Cultivar: 'Amandine'
- Origin: Brittany, France

'Amandine' is a cultivar of early potato, descended from the varieties 'Charlotte' and 'Mariana'. First bred in Brittany, France, in the early 1990s, it entered the French national list of potato varieties in 1994. 'Amandine' typically produces long tubers with very pale, unblemished skin. Their flesh, firm and also very pale, contains comparatively little starch. Amandine potatoes have become popular in Switzerland.

== Characteristics ==
Amandine is a variety that matures very early to early. It has a yellow flesh, a shallow eye depth, a long shape and a white to yellow skin colour. This variety is relatively poor for storage. It also has a low to medium resistance to late blight on foliage and tubers and is field immune to wart. It has medium to high resistance to scab, low to medium resistance to potato leaf roll virus and it has a very low to low resistance to potato virus Y.
