= Mohammed Houari =

Moroccan basketball player

Mohammed Houari Bassim
MAS
- Position: Forward
- League: Moroccan League

Personal information
- Born: January 26, 1977 (age 49) Fes, Morocco
- Listed height: 6 ft 6 in (1.98 m)
- Listed weight: 212 lb (96 kg)

Mohammed Houari Bassim (born January 26, 1977) is a Moroccan basketball player. He currently plays for MAS in the Moroccan Basketball League.

== Career ==
Houari is a member of the Morocco national basketball team and competed for the team at the 2005, 2007 and 2009 FIBA Africa Championship. In the most recent tournament, he saw six games of action off the bench for the 12th place Moroccans.
