= Amandin Rutayisire =

American basketball player (born 1985)

DaMarcus Ellis (born in Dallas but listed by Rwanda as born on June 15, 1985, in Kikukiro) is an American basketball player who played for the Rwanda national basketball team at the 2009 FIBA Africa Championship under the name Amandin Rutayisire. He played for Robert Morris Colonials men's basketball between 2001 and 2003.

Rutayisire was a new addition to the Rwandan team for the 2009 FIBA Africa Championship after the country had made its first ever African championship appearance at the FIBA Africa Championship 2007. At the tournament, Rutayisire averaged 7.6 points per game and 2.5 assists per game to help lead the Rwandans to a 9th-place finish and their best performance to date at the African Championships.
