= Marouen Lahmar =

Tunisian basketball player

Personal information
- Born: 7 February 1982 (age 44) La Goulette, Tunisia
- Listed height: 5 ft 11 in (1.80 m)
- Listed weight: 196 lb (89 kg)

Career information
- Playing career: 2002–2017
- Position: Point guard

Career history
- 2002-2005: ÉS Goulettoise
- 2005-2012: Club Africain
- 2012-2015: Étoile Sportive du Sahel
- 2015-2016: AS Hammamet
- 2016-2017: CS cheminots

Marouen Lahmar
Medal record

Men's basketball

Representing Tunisia

African Championships
Bronze medal – third place	2009 Libya	Tunisia

Marouen Lahmar (born 7 February 1982) is a Tunisian former basketball player.

Lahmar is a member of the Tunisia national basketball team that finished third at the 2009 FIBA Africa Championship to qualify for the country's first FIBA World Championship. Lahmar averaged 2.7 points per game and 1.4 assists per game off the bench for the Tunisians during the tournament. He also played for the eighth place Tunisians at the FIBA Africa Championship 2005.
