= Jean Koumba =

Republic of the Congo basketball player

Jean Serge Davard Koumba (born 15 April 1983) is a basketball player from the Republic of the Congo. He competed with the Republic of the Congo national basketball team at the 2009 African Championship, where he scored 19.5 points per game and grabbed 7.5 rebounds, leading Congo in both fields.
