= Sophian Rafai =

Moroccan-French basketball player

Juvisy
- Position: Guard
- League: French League

Personal information
- Born: 16 December 1986 (age 39) Juvisy-sur-Orge, France
- Listed height: 6 ft 4 in (1.93 m)
- Listed weight: 185 lb (84 kg; 13.2 st)

Sophian Rafai (born 16 December 1986) is a Moroccan-French basketball player currently playing for Juvisy in the French Basketball League.

Rafai is a member of the Morocco national basketball team and competed for the team at the FIBA Africa Championship 2009. After not playing in the team's first six games, Rafai got his first action at the tournament in the consolation bracket against Egypt. In 23 minutes of action, Rafai impressed, scoring a team-leading 14 points on 7 of 8 shooting.
