= Hiram Fuller =

Libyan basketball player (born 1981)

Personal information
- Born: May 15, 1981 (age 45) East St. Louis, Illinois
- Listed height: 6 ft 9 in (2.06 m)
- Listed weight: 240 lb (109 kg)

Career information
- High school: Stadium (Tacoma, Washington)
- College: Modesto JC (1999–2000); Wabash Valley (2000–2001); Fresno State (2001–2003)
- NBA draft: 2003: undrafted
- Position: Power forward
- Number: 15

Career history
- 2003–2004: Charleston Lowgators
- 2004: Atlanta Hawks
- 2004–2006: Florida Flame

Career highlights
- All-NBDL First Team (2005)
- Stats at NBA.com
- Stats at Basketball Reference

Hiram Fuller a.k.a. Hesham Ali Salem (born May 13, 1981) is a Libyan former professional basketball player, who grew up in the United States. He is a 6-foot-9-inch (2.06 m), 268-pound (122 kg) power forward.

Born in East St. Louis, Illinois, he attended Fresno State University after playing at Wabash Valley Junior College and Modesto Junior College. He played in four games for the National Basketball Association's Atlanta Hawks during the 2003-04 NBA season, averaging 2.0 points and 2.8 rebounds.

He played six games for the Utah Jazz during the 2006-07 NBA pre-season.

During the 2009 FIBA Africa Championship for Men, he played for the Libya national basketball team under the name Hesham Ali Salem.
