= Younes Idrissi =

Moroccan basketball player

Tanger
- Position: Forward
- League: Nationale 1

Personal information
- Born: April 13, 1984 (age 42) Casablanca, Morocco
- Listed height: 6 ft 8 in (2.03 m)
- Listed weight: 225 lb (102 kg)

Career information
- Playing career: 2004–present

Career history
- 2002-03: WAC Casablanca
- 2003-04: Massanutten Military Academy
- 2004-06: University of Georgia
- 2006: Iona College
- 2006-08: WAC Casablanca
- 2008-present: Ittihad de Tanger

Younes Idrissi (born April 13, 1984) is a Moroccan basketball player currently playing for Tanger in the Nationale 1.

Idrissi played NCAA Division I college basketball for the University of Georgia, averaging 5.1 PPG and 3.0 RPG in two seasons with the Bulldogs. Idrissi then transferred to Iona College but never played a game for the Gaels. Idrissi has since moved to the Moroccan League, where he has become one of the league's most dominant players, including a 20 PPG and 9 RPG season with WAC Casablanca in 2007–08.

Idrissi played for the Morocco national basketball team in the 2007 and 2009 FIBA Africa Championship. In 2009, he led the tournament in blocks, averaging 1.8 blocks per game.
