= Bertrand Dibessa =

Republic of the Congo basketball player

Bertrand Roger Richard Boukinda Dibessa (born 6 March 1981) is a basketball player from the Republic of the Congo. He competed with the Republic of the Congo national basketball team at the 2009 African Championship, where he scored 14 points per game and grabbed 5.2 rebounds per game.
