= Yunss Akinocho =

Moroccan-French basketball player (born 1987)

Personal information
- Born: 11 March 1987 (age 39) Reims, France
- Listed height: 6 ft 8 in (2.03 m)
- Listed weight: 238 lb (108 kg)

Career information
- College: College of the Sequoias (2006–2008)
- Playing career: 2002–present
- Position: Forward

Career history
- 2002–2004: CFBB
- 2004–2005: Cholet
- 2005–2006: Étendard de Brest
- 2005–2006: Oostende
- 2008–2009: SISU Copenhagen
- 2009–2010: UBC Hannover
- 2009–2010: Crailsheim Merlins
- 2010–2011: Étoile de Charleville-Mézières
- 2011–2012: GET Vosges
- 2012–2013: CEP Lorient

Yunss Prince Michel Akinocho (born 11 March 1987) is a Moroccan-French basketball player. He is also member of the Moroccan national basketball team.

== Career ==
Born in Reims, France, Akinocho first played professional basketball as an 18-year-old in the French League. In his most recent season, Akinocho averaged 8.8 points and 3.8 rebounds per game over eleven games of action for Proveo Merlins Crailsheim in Germany. For the upcoming season, he has signed with Copenhagen sisu of the Danish League.

Akinocho played with the Morocco national basketball team at the FIBA Africa Championship 2009. He played in all eight of Morocco's games, averaging 9.8 points and 3.2 rebounds per game. Prior to this, Akinocho played for the France national basketball team in the 2003 European Championship for Cadets, helping the team to a fifth-place finish.
