= Robert Thomson (basketball) =

Rwandan-American basketball player

Personal information
- Born: January 28, 1982 (age 44) Bethlehem, Pennsylvania, U.S.
- Listed height: 6 ft 11 in (2.11 m)
- Listed weight: 110 kg (243 lb)

Career information
- High school: Saucon Valley High School (Hellertown, Pennsylvania)
- College: Fairfield (2000–2004)
- NBA draft: 2004: undrafted
- Playing career: 2004–2012
- Position: Center

Career history
- 2004–2005: Debreceni Vadkakasok
- 2005–2006: Makedonikos
- 2007–2009: Gaz Metan Mediaș
- 2009: Élan Béarnais
- 2010: Champville SC
- 2010–2011: U-Mobitelco Cluj-Napoca
- 2011–2012: Cercle Sportif Kigali

Robert Thomson (born January 28, 1982) is a Rwandan-American former basketball player currently playing for CS Gaz Metan Mediaş of the Romanian Basketball League. He is a member of the Rwanda men's national basketball team.

Born in Pennsylvania, Thomson graduated from Saucon Valley High School in Hellertown, Pennsylvania. He played college basketball at Fairfield University.

Thomson moved to Rwanda in 2006 after graduating from Fairfield and playing two years of professional basketball in Hungary and Italy. Thomson later received a Rwandan passport and was a member of the Rwanda team that finished ninth at the 2009 FIBA Africa Championship and the 2007 that qualified for the first African championship in Rwandan history. Thomson led all players in rebounds and minutes per game at the 2009 tournament.

== Awards and accomplishments ==
=== Club ===
U Cluj-Napoca

- Liga Națională: (2011)
