= Hamdi Braa =

Tunisian basketball player

No. 86 – ES Radès
- Position: Power forward / center
- League: Championnat National A

Personal information
- Born: 7 September 1986 (age 40) Sfax, Tunisia
- Listed height: 6 ft 8 in (2.03 m)

Career information
- Playing career: 2003–present

Career history
- 2003–2004: JS Kairouan
- 2004–2005: ES Radès
- 2005–2012: ES Sahel
- 2012–2015: Alexandria Sporting Club
- 2015–2018: ES Sahel
- 2018–2019: Gezira
- 2019–2020: ES Sahel
- 2020–2021: Stade Nabeulien
- 2021–present: ES Radès

Career highlights
- 5× Tunisian League champion (2007, 2009, 2011–2013); 4× Tunisian Cup winner (2011–2013, 2016)
Medals
Men's basketball
Representing Tunisia
African Championships
Bronze medal – third place	2009 Libya	Tunisia
Bronze medal – third place	2015 Tunisia	Tunisia

Hamdi Braa (born 7 September 1986) is a Tunisian basketball player for ES Radès in the Championnat National A. Braa has played professionally since 2004. He helped the club to the 2007 Tunisian Championship.

Braa is a member of the Tunisia national basketball team that finished third at the 2009 FIBA Africa Championship to qualify for the country's first FIBA World Championship. Braa averaged 5 PPG and 3.6 RPG for the Tunisians during the tournament. He also competed for the Tunisians in the 2007 FIBA Africa Championship.
