= Mohamad Hachad =

Moroccan basketball player (born 1983)

Mohamed Hachad
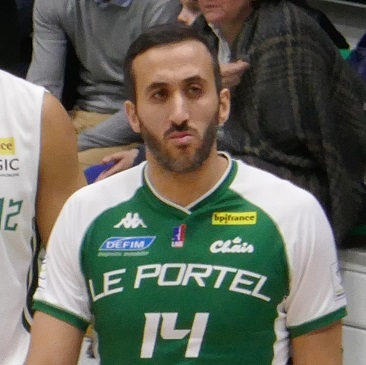
- Hachad with Le Portel in 2018

No. 14 – ESSM Le Portel
- Position: Point guard / shooting guard
- League: LNB Pro A

Personal information
- Born: 22 July 1983 (age 43) Casablanca, Morocco
- Listed height: 6 ft 4 in (1.93 m)
- Listed weight: 200 lb (91 kg)

Career information
- College: Northwestern (2002–2006)
- Playing career: 2006–present

Career history
- 2006-2007: Montreal Matrix
- 2007: Sion Hérens
- 2007–2008: Saint-Étienne
- 2008–2010: SPO Rouen
- 2010–2014: Fos Provence
- 2014–2016: Al-Shamal
- 2016–2018: Le Portel
- 2018–2019: Fos Provence

Mohamed Hachad (born 22 July 1983) is a Moroccan basketball player. He currently plays for ESSM Le Portel of the LNB Pro A. He is also member of the Moroccan national basketball team.

== Career ==
Born in Casablanca, Hachad grew up in Morocco and Montreal, Quebec. His father also played basketball for Morocco's national team. After being named high school's Mr. Quebec by a panel of sportswriters in the province, Hachad committed to play NCAA Division I basketball at Northwestern University. Hachad was a four-year starter for the Wildcats and was named to the 2006 All-Big 10 Defensive Team following a senior year in which he led the Wildcats with 42 steals and 5 rebounds per game. Hachad finished his Northwestern career third on the Wildcats' all-time steals list and 11th on the all-time games played list.

After graduation, Hachad was invited to try out for the Toronto Raptors and later committed to play for the Montreal Matrix in the ABA league. Later on that season, Hachad moved on to play with Sion Herens Basket of the Swiss Professional Basketball League. In twelve games with the team, Hachad averaged 19.3 PPG, 4.6 RPG, and 5.2 APG with the team. Impressed with this performance, SPO Rouen Basket of the French League signed Hachad for the 2008–09 season. In 28 games with the team, Hachad averaged a solid 9.6 PPG to go along with 4.0 RPG and 1.4 SPG. He later signed a 4-year deal with Fos Provence Basket before moving to Qatar and playing for Al Shamam club in 2014 and 2016 where he averaged 20.1 points per game. In 2016, Hachad returned to the north of France to play for ESSM Le portel for 2 seasons, participating in the European FIBA Cup where he helped his team make it the semi-finals of the championship. Hachad returned and played his last season with his previous team Fos provence Basket where he retired in 2019–2020 season.

== National team career ==
Hachad was the captain of the Moroccan National team for many seasons. He played with the Morocco national basketball team at the 2009 and 2011 FIBA Africa Championship. He averaged 13.2 PPG, 6.3 RPG, and 5.3 APG, although Morocco limped to a disappointing 12th-place finish in the competition after losing four of five games following a 2–1 start.

== Retirement ==
Mohamed Hachad was selected to participate in the FIBA time-out Program called TIME-OUT. TIME-OUT helps basketball players transition from sport into new careers, and is to be relaunched by FIBA Europe with financial support from the EU's Erasmus+ Sport program. Hachad is also the founder of the online learning platform AFRICA SPORTS CAMPUS, which empowers sports coaches for career and professional growth through select courses, programs and certifications online.
