= Libya men's national basketball team =

Libya
- FIBA ranking: NR (1 September 2026)
- Joined FIBA: 1961
- FIBA zone: FIBA Africa
- National federation: Libya Arab Basketball Federation
- Coach: Ahmed Marei

FIBA Africa Championship
- Appearances: 5
Home	Away

Biggest defeat
- Libya 52–115 South Sudan (Moçâmedes, Angola; 14 August 2025)

The Libyan national basketball team represents Libya in international basketball matches and is controlled by the Kurat As-Sallah al-Leebiyyah (Libyan Basketball Federation). Libya has been an official affiliate of FIBA since 1961.

They finished 5th at the African Basketball Championship twice. The country hosted the AfroBasket 2009 event where they finished 11th, ahead of heavily favored Morocco and Mozambique.

== History ==
Libya became a member of FIBA in 1961 but has made only sporadic appearances at AfroBasket, participating in 1965, 1970, and 1978, before hosting the tournament in 2009 in Tripoli and Benghazi. As hosts, they finished 11th with a 3–4 record. The tournament that year was played at the African Union Arena (Tripoli) and Suliman Ad-Dharrath Arena (Benghazi).

Following the 2009 AfroBasket, Libya endured a prolonged absence from the continental stage until the qualifying cycle for AfroBasket 2025. In a dramatic turn in **February 2024**, they upset Morocco in the Zone 1 Pre-Qualifiers in Monastir, Tunisia—winning on aggregate to advance to the main qualification round.

In the first qualifying window, Libya posted a strong 2–1 record: earning a thrilling overtime win against Nigeria (89–82), falling narrowly to Cape Verde, and defeating Uganda (71–59).

Their qualifier campaign continued with momentum in the second window, finishing with a 4–2 record—including key wins over Cape Verde and Uganda—thereby securing their first AfroBasket qualification in 16 years. The achievement sparked widespread celebrations across Libya, particularly in Tripoli, where fans welcomed them with singing, fireworks, and national pride.

Central to this renaissance was team captain Mohamed Sadi, who etched his name into AfroBasket lore by recording the first-ever triple-double in tournament qualifying history—24 points, 12 assists, and 10 steals in the opening qualifier against Nigeria.

Libya also enjoyed regional success, capturing a silver medal at the **2023 Arab Nations Championship** in Cairo—their first final appearance in the tournament—after falling to hosts Egypt in the final.

== Performance at international competitions ==
Overall, Libya has competed in many international competitions, including the 2005 Islamic Solidarity Games, and the 2007 Pan Arab Games. The Libyan national team participated in the FIBA Africa Championship games four times, in 1965, 1970, 1978 and 2009, where they placed fifth, fifth, tenth and eleventh respectively.

=== Summer Olympics ===
Yet to qualify

=== World championships ===
Yet to qualify

=== FIBA Africa Championship ===
Year	Round	Position	GP	W	L
(United Arab Republic) 1962	Did not qualify				
(Morocco) 1964	Did not qualify				
(Tunisia) 1965	Main round	5th	5	1	4
(Morocco) 1968	Did not qualify				
(Egypt) 1970	Fifth place	5th	3	1	2
(Senegal) 1972	Did not qualify				
(Central African Republic) 1974	Did not qualify				
(Egypt) 1975	Did not qualify				
(Senegal) 1978	Classification stage	10th	5	0	5
(Morocco) 1980	Did not qualify				
(Somalia) 1981	Did not qualify				
(Egypt) 1983	Did not qualify				
(Ivory Coast) 1985	Did not qualify				
(Tunisia) 1987	Did not qualify				
(Angola) 1989	Did not qualify				
(Egypt) 1992	Did not qualify				
(Kenya) 1993	Did not qualify				
(Algeria) 1995	Did not qualify				
(Senegal) 1997	Did not qualify				
(Angola) 1999	Did not qualify				
(Morocco) 2001	Did not qualify				
(Egypt) 2003	Did not qualify				
(Algeria) 2005	Did not qualify				
(Angola) 2007	Did not qualify				
(Libya) 2009	Classification stage	11th	8	3	5
(Madagascar) 2011	Did not qualify				
(Ivory Coast) 2013	Did not qualify				
(Tunisia) 2015	Did not qualify				
(Tunisia) (Senegal) 2017	Did not qualify				
(Rwanda) 2021	Did not qualify				
(Angola) 2025	Preliminary round	16th	3	0	3
Total			24	5	19

=== Pan Arab Games ===
- 2004: (bronze)

=== Mediterranean Games ===
Never participated

Beginning with the 2018 event, regular basketball was replaced by 3x3 basketball.

=== Islamic Solidarity Games ===
- 2005 – 11th
- 2013 – Did not participate

Beginning with the 2017 event, regular basketball was replaced by 3x3 basketball.

=== Arab Nations Cup ===
- 1978-2005 – ?
- 2007 – Quarterfinals
- 2008 – First round
- 2009 – Quarterfinals
- 2011-2018 – Did not participate

== Team ==
=== Current roster ===
Team for the 2025 FIBA AfroBasket.

Libya national basketball team roster
Players
Coaches

Pos.	No.	Name	Age – Date of birth	Height	Club	Ctr.
SG	2	Ali Madi	26 – 17 February 1999	1.90 m (6 ft 3 in)	Al Ittihad Tripoli	(Libya)
G	5	Naseim Badrush	26 – 13 October 1998	1.89 m (6 ft 2 in)	Al Ahli Tripoli	(Libya)
F	8	Adrees Zeew	25 – 10 May 2000	1.98 m (6 ft 6 in)	Al Ahli Benghazi	(Libya)
PF	9	Sofian Hamad (C)	26 – 16 October 1998	2.01 m (6 ft 7 in)	Al Ahli Benghazi	(Libya)
C	11	Abdulgader Rezg	28 – 28 January 1997	2.10 m (6 ft 11 in)	Al Ittihad Tripoli	(Libya)
F	14	Abdulajabar Aboufardah	24 – 1 December 2000	1.93 m (6 ft 4 in)	Al Ahli Tripoli	(Libya)
PF	15	Wajdi Dawo	36 – 29 October 1988	2.00 m (6 ft 7 in)	Al Ahli Tripoli	(Libya)
PF	23	Ghayth Almaghribi	26 – 25 January 1999	2.04 m (6 ft 8 in)	Al Ahli Benghazi	(Libya)
PG	30	Mahmoud Benalhaj	34 – 25 January 1991	1.89 m (6 ft 2 in)	Al Ahli Tripoli	(Libya)
G	31	Ali Arheemah	22 – 3 March 2003	1.87 m (6 ft 2 in)	Al Ittihad Tripoli	(Libya)
PG	98	Ahmed Algharabi	27 – 12 June 1998	1.85 m (6 ft 1 in)	Al Ahli Benghazi	(Libya)
F	99	Mohamed Buzgaiya	26 – 17 January 1999	1.99 m (6 ft 6 in)	Al-Nasr SC	(Libya)

Head coach

- (United States) Sam Vincent

Assistant coach(es)

- (Libya) Nabil Kabalan
- (United States) Dean Murray

Legend

- (C) Team captain
- Club – describes last
  club before the tournament
- Age – describes age
  on 12 August 2025

=== Head coach position ===
- (Lebanon) Samir Khatib – 1980s
- (Lebanon) Ali Basyuni – 1990s
- (Libya) Mohamed Khalil – 2000s
- (Serbia) Srđan Antić – 2007–2008
- (United States) Kevin Nickelberry – 2009–2010
- (Serbia) Srđan Antić – 2010–2011
- (Serbia) Veselin Matić – 2013
- (Lebanon) Fouad Abou Chakra – 2024
- (United States) Sam Vincent – 2025

=== Past rosters ===
At the 2015 Afrobasket qualification:

Libya men's national basketball team roster
Players
Coaches

Pos.	No.	Name	Age – Date of birth	Height	Club	Ctr.
	4	Abdulaziz Sudani	35 – 1 January 1980			(Libya)
	5	Mahmoud Abdalla Benalhaj	24 – 25 January 1991			(Libya)
	6	Tarek A. Farag Al Beigow	22 – 14 January 1993			(Libya)
	7	Nadir Ayad	31 – 1 May 1984		Al-Ahly SC (Benghazi)	(Libya)
	8	Otman A. Otman Sedek	27 – 13 June 1988			(Libya)
	9	Eslam Ibrahim El Karbal	32 – 21 May 1983			(Libya)
	10	Milad Mohamed	27 – 15 April 1988		Al-Ahly SC (Benghazi)	(Libya)
	11	Eslam Ibrahim El Karbal	32 – 21 May 1983
	12	Omar Abdel Raman O. Derfeili	18 – 2 March 1997			(Libya)
	13	Anis Zaid Ali Elmansouri	20 – 4 January 1995
	14	Abdalla Shalabi	24 – 11 January 1991		Al-Wahda SC (Tripoli)	(Libya)
	15	Wajdi Omran Saied Dawo	26 – 29 October 1988			(Libya)

Head coach

Assistant coaches

Legend

- Club – describes last
  club before the tournament
- Age – describes age
  on 19 August 2015

Team for the 2009 FIBA Africa Championship.

Libya national basketball team roster
Players
Coaches

Pos.	No.	Name	Age – Date of birth	Height	Club	Ctr.
F/C	4	Raed El-Hamali	29 – 8 August 1979	2.04 m (6 ft 8 in)	Al Wasl	(United Arab Emirates)
G	5	Mohamed Youssif Kuneidir	23 – 10 January 1986		Al-Ahly	(Libya)
G	6	Mohamed Issa Mrsal	31 – 1 January 1978
F/C	7	Hesham Ali Salem	25 – 13 May 1984	2.06 m (6 ft 9 in)	La Guaira BBC	(Venezuela)
	8	Mohamed Moftah Abu-Khir	22 – 4 March 1987		Al Ittihad	(Libya)
	9	Khaled Saad Matrud	19 – 9 November 1989
C	10	Yahya Shakmak	24 – 1 January 1985		Al Nasr Benghazi	(Libya)
	12	Alamien Mohamed Yagoub	28 – 1 March 1981
	13	Mohamed Abdallah Belhaj	24 – 25 July 1985
	14	Wajdi Omran Dawo	20 – 29 October 1988
G/F	15	Al-Fath Belgasem	29 – 4 February 1980	1.97 m (6 ft 6 in)	Bakersfield Jam	(United States)

Head coach

- (United States) Kevin Nickelberry

Assistant coach(es)

- (Libya) Osman Bangora

Legend

- (C) Team captain
- nat field describes country
  of last club
  before the tournament
- Age field is age on 5 August 2009

== Kit ==
=== Manufacturer ===
2009: Nike

== See also ==
- Libya national under-19 basketball team
- Eslam El Karbal
- Suleiman Ali Nashnush
