= Mohamed Khorshid =

Egyptian basketball player

Mohamed Khorshid (born September 18, 1985, in Alexandria, Egypt) is an Egyptian basketball player currently playing for Sporting Alexandria of the Egyptian Super League. He is a member of the Egypt national basketball team.

Khorshid participated with the Egypt national basketball team at the 2009 FIBA Africa Championship. Despite only averaging 18.3 minutes per game off the bench for Egypt, he grabbed a team leading 6.6 rebounds per game. However, the team finished a disappointing tenth place; this was Egypt's worst ever finish in 19 appearances at the tournament and had some fans calling for a complete dismantling of the team. In 2021, Khorshid announced he was considering retirement.
