= Ahmed Marei =

Egyptian basketball player and coach

Al Morog
- Position: Head coach
- League: Libyan Division I Basketball League

Personal information
- Born: 5 January 1959 (age 67)

Career history

Coaching
- 2014–2015: Egypt
- 2019–2022: Al Ittihad Alexandria
- 2022–2023: Zamalek
- 2023–present: Al Morog

Career highlights
- As head coach: Egyptian League champion (2020); 2× Egypt Cup winner (2020, 2021); 2× Egypt Super Cup winner (2020, 2021)

Ahmed Mohamed Marei (Arabic: أحمد مرعي; born 5 January 1959) is an Egyptian professional basketball coach and former player, currently serving as the head coach for Zamalek SC of the Egyptian Basketball Super League (EBSL). Previously he has also been the head coach of Al Ittihad Alexandria and the Egyptian national team.

== Playing career ==
He played for Egypt's national team in 1984 when he was a part of the team at the 1984 Olympics in Los Angeles.

== Coaching career ==
Marei coached Al Ittihad Alexandria from 2019 to 2022 and helped the team win the Super League in 2020 and reach the finals in the next two seasons. He also won the Egypt Basketball Cup in 2020 and 2021. In May 2022, Marei signed to become the head coach of Zamalek.

Marei took over as head coach of Al Morog in Libya in April 2022.

== Personal ==
Marei is the father of Ali Marei and Assem Marei, who has been a playing professionally as well as for the Egyptian national team.
