= 2014 FIBA Basketball World Cup squads =

The 2014 FIBA Basketball World Cup included teams with rosters of 12 players each; a team may opt to have one naturalized player from its roster. The rosters were finalized at the team managers' meeting, at the night prior to the first game.

Player ages are as of 30 August 2014, the first day of the tournament.

== Group A ==
=== Brazil ===
Brazil announced 10 of its final 12-man squad on 18 June 2014. The remaining two members were drawn from the Brazil team that competed at the 2014 FIBA South American Championship in Venezuela in late July. A 14-player roster was named on 6 August. The 12-player squad was revealed on 13 August 2014.

Brazil men's national basketball team - 2014 FIBA Basketball World Cup roster
Players
Coaches

| Pos. | No. | Name | Age – Date of birth | Height | Club | Ctr. |
|---|---|---|---|---|---|---|
| G | 4 | Marcelinho Machado | 39 – 12 April 1975 | 2.00 m (6 ft 7 in) | Flamengo | (Brazil) |
| G | 5 | Raulzinho Neto | 22 – 19 May 1992 | 1.85 m (6 ft 1 in) | Gipuzkoa Basket | (Spain) |
| F | 6 | Rafael Hettsheimeir | 28 – 16 June 1986 | 2.08 m (6 ft 10 in) | Unicaja Málaga | (Spain) |
| G | 7 | Larry Taylor | 33 – 3 October 1980 | 1.84 m (6 ft 0 in) | Bauru | (Brazil) |
| G | 8 | Alex Garcia | 34 – 4 March 1980 | 1.92 m (6 ft 4 in) | Universo Brasilia | (Brazil) |
| G | 9 | Marcelinho Huertas | 31 – 25 May 1983 | 1.90 m (6 ft 3 in) | FC Barcelona | (Spain) |
| G | 10 | Leandro Barbosa | 31 – 28 November 1982 | 1.94 m (6 ft 4 in) | Phoenix Suns | (United States) |
| C | 11 | Anderson Varejão | 31 – 28 September 1982 | 2.11 m (6 ft 11 in) | Cleveland Cavaliers | (United States) |
| F | 12 | Guilherme Giovannoni | 34 – 2 June 1980 | 2.08 m (6 ft 10 in) | Brasília | (Brazil) |
| F | 13 | Nenê | 31 – 13 September 1982 | 2.11 m (6 ft 11 in) | Washington Wizards | (United States) |
| F | 14 | Marcus Vieira | 30 – 31 May 1984 | 2.07 m (6 ft 9 in) | Flamengo | (Brazil) |
| C | 15 | Tiago Splitter | 29 – 1 January 1985 | 2.11 m (6 ft 11 in) | San Antonio Spurs | (United States) |

Head coach

- Rubén Magnano

Assistant coach(es)

- Gustavo De Conti
- José Alves Neto

Legend

- Club – describes last
  club before the tournament
- Age – describes age
  on 30 August 2014

=== Egypt ===
A 16-player preliminary roster was named on 29 July. On 14 August 2014 the roster was cut down to 14. On 22 August the 12-player roster was announced.

Egypt men's national basketball team - 2014 FIBA Basketball World Cup roster
Players
Coaches

| Pos. | No. | Name | Age – Date of birth | Height | Club |
|---|---|---|---|---|---|---|
| F | 4 | Seif Samir | 21 – 5 June 1993 | 2.03 m (6 ft 8 in) | Al Ahly | (Egypt) |
| G | 5 | Amr Gendy | 23 – 14 June 1991 | 1.93 m (6 ft 4 in) | Gezira | (Egypt) |
| C | 6 | Haytham Kamal | 26 – 17 November 1987 | 2.07 m (6 ft 9 in) | Al Ittihad | (Egypt) |
| G | 7 | Wael Badr (C) | 35 – 1 December 1978 | 1.92 m (6 ft 4 in) | Sporting | (Egypt) |
| F | 8 | Moamen Abouelanin | 28 – 25 June 1986 | 1.94 m (6 ft 4 in) | Al Ittihad | (Egypt) |
| G | 9 | Ibrahim El-Gammal | 26 – 23 March 1988 | 1.91 m (6 ft 3 in) | Al Ahly | (Egypt) |
| G | 10 | Mouhanad El-Sabagh | 26 – 23 April 1988 | 1.86 m (6 ft 1 in) | Al Ittihad | (Egypt) |
| G | 11 | Sherif Genedy | 35 – 3 April 1979 | 1.88 m (6 ft 2 in) | Gezira | (Egypt) |
| F | 12 | Youssef Shousha | 21 – 9 June 1993 | 1.90 m (6 ft 3 in) | Al Ittihad | (Egypt) |
| G | 13 | Moustafa Elmekawi | 19 – 22 October 1994 | 2.04 m (6 ft 8 in) | El Zamalek | (Egypt) |
| F | 14 | Rami Ibrahim | 26 – 6 February 1988 | 2.04 m (6 ft 8 in) | Al Ittihad | (Egypt) |
| F | 15 | Ashraf Rabie | 31 – 16 January 1983 | 2.05 m (6 ft 9 in) | Al Ittihad | (Egypt) |

Head coach

- Amr Aboul Kheir

Assistant coach(es)

- Sabry Saleh

Legend

- Club – describes last
  club before the tournament
- Age – describes age
  on 30 August 2014

=== France ===
France initially announced a 24-man preliminary roster, and announced seven cuts on 13 June 2014. On 21 July, one of the players on the 17-man roster, Alexis Ajinça, announced that he would not play in the World Cup because his wife was expected to give birth during the tournament. Three days later, Kevin Séraphin announced that his NBA team, the Washington Wizards, would not release him for the World Cup because he was recovering from a knee surgery; Séraphin was replaced on the training roster by Ian Mahinmi. The roster was trimmed down to 14 on 10 August 2014 and to 13 a day later. On 12 August 2014 the 12-player roster was announced. Nando de Colo was ruled out of the world cup due to a fractured hand on 17 August 2014. Charles Lombahe-Kahudi was named as the replacement on 19 August 2014. Kim Tillie replaced Ian Mahinmi, who was ruled out due to a left shoulder injury.

France men's national basketball team - 2014 FIBA Basketball World Cup roster
Players
Coaches

| Pos. | No. | Name | Age – Date of birth | Height | Club | Ctr. |
|---|---|---|---|---|---|---|
| G | 4 | Thomas Heurtel | 25 – 10 April 1989 | 1.87 m (6 ft 2 in) | Saski Baskonia | (Spain) |
| F | 5 | Nicolas Batum | 25 – 14 December 1988 | 2.03 m (6 ft 8 in) | Portland Trail Blazers | (United States) |
| G | 6 | Antoine Diot | 25 – 17 January 1989 | 1.91 m (6 ft 3 in) | Strasbourg IG | (France) |
| C | 7 | Joffrey Lauvergne | 22 – 30 September 1991 | 2.09 m (6 ft 10 in) | Partizan Belgrade | (Serbia) |
| F | 8 | Charles Lombahe-Kahudi | 28 – 19 July 1986 | 1.97 m (6 ft 6 in) | Le Mans | (France) |
| F | 9 | Edwin Jackson | 24 – 18 September 1989 | 1.90 m (6 ft 3 in) | ASVEL Basket | (France) |
| G | 10 | Evan Fournier | 21 – 29 November 1992 | 2.00 m (6 ft 7 in) | Denver Nuggets | (United States) |
| F | 11 | Florent Piétrus | 33 – 19 January 1981 | 2.01 m (6 ft 7 in) | SLUC Nancy | (France) |
| C | 12 | Rudy Gobert | 22 – 26 June 1992 | 2.15 m (7 ft 1 in) | Utah Jazz | (United States) |
| F | 13 | Boris Diaw | 32 – 16 April 1982 | 2.05 m (6 ft 9 in) | San Antonio Spurs | (United States) |
| F | 14 | Kim Tillie | 26 – 15 July 1988 | 2.11 m (6 ft 11 in) | UCAM Murcia | (Spain) |
| F | 15 | Mickaël Gelabale | 31 – 22 May 1983 | 2.01 m (6 ft 7 in) | Khimki | (Russia) |

Head coach

- Vincent Collet

Assistant coach(es)

- Jacques Commères
- Ruddy Nelhomme

Legend

- Club – describes last
  club before the tournament
- Age – describes age
  on 30 August 2014

=== Iran ===
Iran announced an initial 15-man training roster on 26 July 2014 and cut the roster to 13 on 9 August 2014. The final roster was announced on 27 August 2014.

Iran men's national basketball team roster
Players
Coaches
}

| Pos. | No. | Name | Age – Date of birth | Height | Club | Ctr. |
|---|---|---|---|---|---|---|
| C | 4 | Rouzbeh Arghavan | 26 – 18 May 1988 | 2.10 m (6 ft 11 in) | Zob Ahan Isfahan | (Iran) |
| G | 5 | Sajjad Mashayekhi | 20 – 5 March 1994 | 1.78 m (5 ft 10 in) | Mahram Tehran | (Iran) |
| G | 6 | Behnam Yakhchali | 18 – 31 December 1995 | 1.91 m (6 ft 3 in) | Petrochimi Bandar Imam | (Iran) |
| G | 7 | Mehdi Kamrani | 32 – 1 June 1982 | 1.82 m (6 ft 0 in) | Petrochimi Bandar Imam | (Iran) |
| F | 8 | Arsalan Kazemi | 24 – 22 April 1990 | 2.01 m (6 ft 7 in) | Petrochimi Bandar Imam | (Iran) |
| F | 9 | Arman Zangeneh | 21 – 15 June 1993 | 2.02 m (6 ft 8 in) | Mahram Tehran | (Iran) |
| G | 10 | Hamed Afagh | 31 – 1 February 1983 | 1.92 m (6 ft 4 in) | Petrochimi Bandar Imam | (Iran) |
| F | 11 | Oshin Sahakian | 28 – 21 March 1986 | 2.02 m (6 ft 8 in) | Mahram Tehran | (Iran) |
| C | 12 | Asghar Kardoust | 28 – 21 March 1986 | 2.10 m (6 ft 11 in) | Kazma | (Kuwait) |
| F | 13 | Mohammad Jamshidi | 23 – 30 July 1991 | 1.95 m (6 ft 5 in) | Azad University Tehran | (Iran) |
| F | 14 | Samad Nikkhah Bahrami (C) | 31 – 11 May 1983 | 1.98 m (6 ft 6 in) | Mahram Tehran | (Iran) |
| C | 15 | Hamed Haddadi | 29 – 19 May 1985 | 2.18 m (7 ft 2 in) | Mahram Tehran | (Iran) |

Head coach

- (Slovenia) Memi Bečirovič

Assistant coach(es)

- (Iran) Mehran Shahintab
- (Iran) Safa Ali Kamalian

Legend

- (C) Team captain
- Club – describes last
  club before the tournament
- Age – describes age
  on 30 August 2014

=== Serbia ===
On 23 July 2014, coach Aleksandar Đorđević announced a preliminary squad for the World Cup. Due to injury Vladimir Lučić, Vasilije Micić, Ognjen Kuzmić and Nemanja Dangubić canceled their participation at the end of July. On 19 August 2014 Nemanja Nedović was ruled out due to a foot injury. On 24 August 2014, Vladimir Micov left the national team, before the final roster was published two days later.

Serbia men's national basketball team - 2014 FIBA Basketball World Cup roster
Players
Coaches

| Pos. | No. | Name | Age – Date of birth | Height | Club | Ctr. |
|---|---|---|---|---|---|---|
| G | 4 | Miloš Teodosić | 27 – 19 March 1987 | 1.95 m (6 ft 5 in) | CSKA Moscow | (Russia) |
| F | 5 | Marko Simonović | 28 – 30 April 1986 | 2.03 m (6 ft 8 in) | Red Star Belgrade | (Serbia) |
| G | 6 | Stefan Jović | 23 – 3 November 1990 | 1.96 m (6 ft 5 in) | Radnički Kragujevac | (Serbia) |
| G | 7 | Bogdan Bogdanović | 22 – 18 August 1992 | 1.97 m (6 ft 6 in) | Partizan | (Serbia) |
| F | 8 | Nemanja Bjelica | 26 – 9 May 1988 | 2.09 m (6 ft 10 in) | Fenerbahçe | (Turkey) |
| G | 9 | Stefan Marković | 26 – 25 April 1988 | 1.91 m (6 ft 3 in) | Banvit | (Turkey) |
| F | 10 | Nikola Kalinić | 22 – 8 November 1991 | 2.02 m (6 ft 8 in) | Radnički Kragujevac | (Serbia) |
| F | 11 | Stefan Birčević | 24 – 12 December 1989 | 2.10 m (6 ft 11 in) | Radnički Kragujevac | (Serbia) |
| C | 12 | Nenad Krstić | 31 – 25 July 1983 | 2.12 m (6 ft 11 in) | CSKA Moscow | (Russia) |
| C | 13 | Miroslav Raduljica | 26 – 5 January 1988 | 2.13 m (7 ft 0 in) | Milwaukee Bucks | (United States) |
| C | 14 | Raško Katić | 33 – 8 December 1980 | 2.08 m (6 ft 10 in) | Red Star Belgrade | (Serbia) |
| C | 15 | Vladimir Štimac | 27 – 25 August 1987 | 2.11 m (6 ft 11 in) | Unicaja Málaga | (Spain) |

Head coach

- Aleksandar Đorđević

Assistant coach(es)

- Jovica Antonić
- Milan Minić
- Miroslav Nikolić

Legend

- Club – describes last
  club before the tournament
- Age – describes age
  on 30 August 2014

=== Spain ===
Spain announced its final 12-man roster on 1 July 2014.

Spain men's national basketball team - 2014 FIBA Basketball World Cup roster
Players
Coaches

| Pos. | No. | Name | Age – Date of birth | Height | Club | Ctr. |
|---|---|---|---|---|---|---|
| F/C | 4 | Pau Gasol | 34 – 6 July 1980 | 2.13 m (7 ft 0 in) | Los Angeles Lakers | (United States) |
| F | 5 | Rudy Fernández | 29 – 4 April 1985 | 1.95 m (6 ft 5 in) | Real Madrid | (Spain) |
| G | 6 | Sergio Rodríguez | 28 – 12 June 1986 | 1.90 m (6 ft 3 in) | Real Madrid | (Spain) |
| G | 7 | Juan Carlos Navarro (C) | 34 – 13 June 1980 | 1.93 m (6 ft 4 in) | FC Barcelona | (Spain) |
| G | 8 | José Calderón | 32 – 28 September 1981 | 1.91 m (6 ft 3 in) | Dallas Mavericks | (United States) |
| F | 9 | Felipe Reyes | 34 – 16 March 1980 | 2.03 m (6 ft 8 in) | Real Madrid | (Spain) |
| F | 10 | Víctor Claver | 26 – 30 August 1988 | 2.07 m (6 ft 9 in) | Portland Trail Blazers | (United States) |
| G | 11 | Ricky Rubio | 23 – 21 October 1990 | 1.93 m (6 ft 4 in) | Minnesota Timberwolves | (United States) |
| G | 12 | Sergio Llull | 26 – 15 November 1987 | 1.90 m (6 ft 3 in) | Real Madrid | (Spain) |
| C | 13 | Marc Gasol | 29 – 29 January 1985 | 2.14 m (7 ft 0 in) | Memphis Grizzlies | (United States) |
| C | 14 | Serge Ibaka | 24 – 18 September 1989 | 2.08 m (6 ft 10 in) | Oklahoma City Thunder | (United States) |
| F | 15 | Álex Abrines | 21 – 1 August 1993 | 1.98 m (6 ft 6 in) | FC Barcelona | (Spain) |

Head coach

- (Spain) Juan Antonio Orenga

Assistant coach(es)

- (Spain) Sito Alonso
- (Spain) Joaquim Costa Puig
- (Spain) Jenaro Díaz

Legend

- Club – describes last
  club before the tournament
- Age – describes age
  on 30 August 2014

== Group B ==
=== Argentina ===
Argentina announced nine of its final 12-man roster in June 2014. However, three of the initially named players were ruled out of the competition. First, on 7 July, Juan Pedro Gutiérrez was ruled out of the World Cup due to an injury. By the end of the month, Carlos Delfino was ruled out due to a foot injury that had caused him to miss the entire 2013–14 NBA season with the Milwaukee Bucks and the San Antonio Spurs notified Manu Ginóbili, who was recovering from a stress fracture, that they would not release him for the World Cup.

The remaining members came from the squad that played at the 2014 FIBA South American Championship in Venezuela in late July. A 14-player squad was released on 7 August 2014.

The final roster was announced on 12 August 2014.

Argentina men's national basketball team - 2014 FIBA Basketball World Cup roster
Players
Coaches

| Pos. | No. | Name | Age – Date of birth | Height | Club | Ctr. |
|---|---|---|---|---|---|---|
| F | 4 | Luis Scola | 34 – 30 April 1980 | 2.06 m (6 ft 9 in) | Indiana Pacers | (United States) |
| C | 5 | Tayavek Gallizzi | 21 – 8 February 1993 | 2.05 m (6 ft 9 in) | Quilmes (MdP) | (Argentina) |
| F | 6 | Marcos Mata | 28 – 1 August 1986 | 2.01 m (6 ft 7 in) | CB Sevilla | (Spain) |
| G | 7 | Facundo Campazzo | 23 – 23 March 1991 | 1.81 m (5 ft 11 in) | Peñarol Mar del Plata | (Argentina) |
| G | 8 | Pablo Prigioni (C) | 37 – 17 May 1977 | 1.90 m (6 ft 3 in) | New York Knicks | (United States) |
| G | 9 | Nicolás Laprovíttola | 24 – 31 January 1990 | 1.85 m (6 ft 1 in) | Flamengo | (Brazil) |
| F | 10 | Leonardo Gutiérrez | 36 – 16 May 1978 | 2.00 m (6 ft 7 in) | Peñarol (MdP) | (Argentina) |
| C | 11 | Marcos Delía | 22 – 8 April 1992 | 2.09 m (6 ft 10 in) | Boca Juniors | (Argentina) |
| F | 12 | Walter Herrmann | 35 – 26 June 1979 | 2.06 m (6 ft 9 in) | Atenas de Córdoba | (Argentina) |
| F | 13 | Andrés Nocioni (C) | 34 – 30 November 1979 | 2.01 m (6 ft 7 in) | Laboral Kutxa Vitoria | (Spain) |
| F | 14 | Matías Bortolín | 21 – 11 April 1993 | 2.07 m (6 ft 9 in) | Regatas Corrientes | (Argentina) |
| F | 15 | Selem Safar | 27 – 6 May 1987 | 1.90 m (6 ft 3 in) | Boca Juniors | (Argentina) |

Head coach

- Julio Lamas

Assistant coach(es)

- Nicolas Casalánguida
- Gonzalo García

Legend

- (C) Team captain
- Club – describes last
  club before the tournament
- Age – describes age
  on 30 August 2014

=== Croatia ===
Croatia announced its initial 24-man training roster on 26 June 2014, and cut the roster to 17 on 10 July. The roster was down to 15 on 7 August 2014. Croatia announced its final roster on 23 August 2014.

Croatia men's national basketball team - 2014 FIBA Basketball World Cup roster
Players
Coaches

| Pos. | No. | Name | Age – Date of birth | Height | Club | Ctr. |
|---|---|---|---|---|---|---|
| C | 4 | Ante Tomić | 27 – 17 February 1987 | 2.17 m (7 ft 1 in) | FC Barcelona | (Spain) |
| C | 5 | Lukša Andrić | 29 – 29 January 1985 | 2.10 m (6 ft 11 in) | Türk Telekom | (Turkey) |
| G | 6 | Oliver Lafayette | 30 – 6 May 1984 | 1.88 m (6 ft 2 in) | Valencia Basket | (Spain) |
| G | 7 | Bojan Bogdanović | 25 – 18 April 1989 | 2.00 m (6 ft 7 in) | Fenerbahçe Ülker | (Turkey) |
| F | 8 | Dario Šarić | 20 – 8 April 1994 | 2.08 m (6 ft 10 in) | Cibona | (Croatia) |
| F | 9 | Damjan Rudež | 28 – 17 June 1986 | 2.08 m (6 ft 10 in) | CAI Zaragoza | (Spain) |
| G | 10 | Roko Ukić | 29 – 5 December 1984 | 1.83 m (6 ft 0 in) | Panathinaikos | (Greece) |
| G | 11 | Krunoslav Simon | 29 – 24 June 1985 | 1.96 m (6 ft 5 in) | Lokomotiv Kuban | (Russia) |
| C | 12 | Damir Markota | 28 – 26 December 1985 | 2.09 m (6 ft 10 in) | Bilbao Basket | (Spain) |
| F | 13 | Mario Hezonja | 19 – 25 February 1995 | 2.02 m (6 ft 8 in) | FC Barcelona | (Spain) |
| C | 14 | Luka Žorić | 29 – 5 November 1984 | 2.11 m (6 ft 11 in) | Fenerbahçe | (Turkey) |
| F | 15 | Luka Babić | 22 – 29 September 1991 | 2.00 m (6 ft 7 in) | KK Cedevita | (Croatia) |

Head coach

- Jasmin Repeša

Assistant coach(es)

- Žan Tabak
- Slaven Rimac
- Luka Milanović

Legend

- (C) Team captain
- Club – describes last
  club before the tournament
- Age – describes age
  on 30 August 2014

=== Greece ===
Greece announced a 16-man preliminary roster on 14 July 2014. On 22 July, the agent for Kosta Koufos notified Greece coach Fotis Katsikaris that Koufos would not play in the World Cup; Katsikaris announced Andreas Glyniadakis as a replacement. The 12-player roster was announced on 23 August 2014.

Greece men's national basketball team - 2014 FIBA Basketball World Cup roster
Players
Coaches
}

| Pos. | No. | Name | Age – Date of birth | Height | Club | Ctr. |
|---|---|---|---|---|---|---|
| G | 4 | Vangelis Mantzaris | 24 – 16 April 1990 | 1.96 m (6 ft 5 in) | Olympiacos | (Greece) |
| C | 5 | Ioannis Bourousis | 30 – 17 November 1983 | 2.15 m (7 ft 1 in) | Real Madrid | (Spain) |
| G | 6 | Nikos Zisis (C) | 31 – 16 August 1983 | 1.97 m (6 ft 6 in) | UNICS Kazan | (Russia) |
| G | 7 | Kostas Vasileiadis | 30 – 15 March 1984 | 2.00 m (6 ft 7 in) | Anadolu Efes | (Turkey) |
| G | 8 | Nick Calathes | 25 – 7 February 1989 | 1.98 m (6 ft 6 in) | Memphis Grizzlies | (United States) |
| C | 9 | Andreas Glyniadakis | 33 – 26 August 1981 | 2.16 m (7 ft 1 in) | APOEL | (Cyprus) |
| F | 10 | Kostas Papanikolaou | 24 – 1 August 1990 | 2.04 m (6 ft 8 in) | FC Barcelona | (Spain) |
| G | 11 | Kostas Sloukas | 24 – 15 January 1990 | 1.90 m (6 ft 3 in) | Olympiacos | (Greece) |
| F | 12 | Kostas Kaimakoglou | 31 – 15 March 1983 | 2.06 m (6 ft 9 in) | UNICS Kazan | (Russia) |
| F | 13 | Giannis Antetokounmpo | 19 – 6 December 1994 | 2.11 m (6 ft 11 in) | Milwaukee Bucks | (United States) |
| C | 14 | Ian Vougioukas | 29 – 31 May 1985 | 2.11 m (6 ft 11 in) | UNICS Kazan | (Russia) |
| F | 15 | Georgios Printezis | 29 – 22 February 1985 | 2.06 m (6 ft 9 in) | Olympiacos | (Greece) |

Head coach

- Fotios Katsikaris

Assistant coach(es)

- Thanasis Skourtopoulos
- Dimitris Priftis

Legend

- (C) Team captain
- Club – describes last
  club before the tournament
- Age – describes age
  on 30 August 2014

=== Philippines ===
A 16-man squad was announced on 28 February 2014. On 18 August 2014 the final 12-man roster was announced.

Philippines men's national basketball team - 2014 FIBA Basketball World Cup roster
Players
Coaches

| Pos. | No. | Name | Age – Date of birth | Height | Club | Ctr. |
|---|---|---|---|---|---|---|
| G | 4 | Jimmy Alapag (C) | 36 – 30 December 1977 | 1.75 m (5 ft 9 in) | Talk 'N Text Tropang Texters | (Philippines) |
| G | 5 | LA Tenorio | 30 – 9 July 1984 | 1.73 m (5 ft 8 in) | Barangay Ginebra San Miguel | (Philippines) |
| G | 6 | Jeff Chan | 31 – 11 February 1983 | 1.91 m (6 ft 3 in) | Rain or Shine Elasto Painters | (Philippines) |
| G | 7 | Jayson William | 28 – 30 June 1986 | 1.80 m (5 ft 11 in) | Talk 'N Text Tropang Texters | (Philippines) |
| G | 8 | Gary David | 36 – 13 July 1978 | 1.88 m (6 ft 2 in) | Meralco Bolts | (Philippines) |
| F | 9 | Ranidel de Ocampo | 32 – 8 December 1981 | 1.98 m (6 ft 6 in) | Talk 'N Text Tropang Texters | (Philippines) |
| G/F | 10 | Gabe Norwood | 29 – 9 February 1985 | 1.98 m (6 ft 6 in) | Rain or Shine Elasto Painters | (Philippines) |
| C | 11 | Andray Blatche | 28 – 22 August 1986 | 2.11 m (6 ft 11 in) | Brooklyn Nets | (United States) |
| C | 12 | June Mar Fajardo | 24 – 17 November 1989 | 2.09 m (6 ft 10 in) | San Miguel Beermen | (Philippines) |
| G | 13 | Paul Lee | 25 – 14 February 1989 | 1.81 m (5 ft 11 in) | Rain or Shine Elasto Painters | (Philippines) |
| C | 14 | Japeth Aguilar | 27 – 25 January 1987 | 2.06 m (6 ft 9 in) | Barangay Ginebra San Miguel | (Philippines) |
| F/C | 15 | Marc Pingris | 32 – 16 October 1981 | 1.96 m (6 ft 5 in) | San Mig Super Coffee Mixers | (Philippines) |

Head coach

- Chot Reyes

Assistant coach(es)

- Jong Uichico
- Josh Reyes
- Norman Black

Consultants

- Tab Baldwin
- Natxo Lezcano

Team manager

- Butch Antonio

Legend

- (C) Team captain
- Club – describes last
  club before the tournament
- Age – describes age
  on 30 August 2014

=== Puerto Rico ===
A 15-player roster was announced on 9 August 2014. The final roster was published on 19 August 2014.

Puerto Rico men's national basketball team - 2014 FIBA Basketball World Cup roster
Players
Coaches
}

| Pos. | No. | Name | Age – Date of birth | Height | Club |
|---|---|---|---|---|---|---|
| F | 4 | Ramón Clemente | 28 – 11 December 1985 | 1.98 m (6 ft 6 in) | Indios Mayagüez | (Puerto Rico) |
| G | 5 | José Juan Barea | 30 – 26 June 1984 | 1.80 m (5 ft 11 in) | Minnesota Timberwolves | (United States) |
| F | 6 | Alex Franklin | 26 – 11 July 1988 | 1.98 m (6 ft 6 in) | Indios Mayagüez | (Puerto Rico) |
| G | 7 | Carlos Arroyo (C) | 35 – 30 July 1979 | 1.88 m (6 ft 2 in) | Galatasaray | (Turkey) |
| F | 8 | Ángel Daniel Vassallo | 28 – 2 April 1986 | 1.98 m (6 ft 6 in) | Leones Ponce | (Puerto Rico) |
| F | 9 | Carlos Rivera | 31 – 5 February 1983 | 1.88 m (6 ft 2 in) | Leones Ponce | (Puerto Rico) |
| C | 10 | Jorge Brian Díaz | 24 – 13 November 1989 | 2.11 m (6 ft 11 in) | Piratas Quebradillas | (Puerto Rico) |
| F | 11 | Ricky Sánchez | 27 – 6 July 1987 | 2.11 m (6 ft 11 in) | Cangrejeros Santurce | (Puerto Rico) |
| G | 12 | David Huertas | 27 – 2 June 1987 | 1.95 m (6 ft 5 in) | Piratas Quebradillas | (Puerto Rico) |
| F | 13 | Renaldo Balkman | 30 – 14 July 1984 | 2.00 m (6 ft 7 in) | Capitanes Arecibo | (Puerto Rico) |
| F | 14 | Alex Galindo | 29 – 6 May 1985 | 2.00 m (6 ft 7 in) | Cangrejeros Santurce | (Puerto Rico) |
| C | 15 | Daniel Santiago | 38 – 24 June 1976 | 2.13 m (7 ft 0 in) | Cangrejeros Santurce | (Puerto Rico) |

Head coach

- Paco Olmos

Assistant coach(es)

- Carlos Calcano
- Carlos Morales

Legend

- (C) Team captain
- Club – describes last
  club before the tournament
- Age – describes age
  on 30 August 2014

=== Senegal ===
Senegal announced a 22-man preliminary roster on 7 July 2014. The squad was cut to 16 on 5 August. The 12-player roster was announced on 23 August 2014.

Senegal men's national basketball team - 2014 FIBA Basketball World Cup roster
Players
Coaches

| Pos. | No. | Name | Age – Date of birth | Height | Club |
|---|---|---|---|---|---|---|
| G | 4 | Thierno Niang | 24 – 8 March 1990 | 1.85 m (6 ft 1 in) | Milwaukee Panthers | (United States) |
| G | 5 | Xane D'Almeida | 31 – 21 January 1983 | 1.83 m (6 ft 0 in) | Tarbes–Lourdes | (France) |
| F | 6 | Ibrahima Thomas | 27 – 7 February 1987 | 2.11 m (6 ft 11 in) | Azad University | (Iran) |
| G | 7 | Mamadou N'Doye | 34 – 6 October 1979 | 1.91 m (6 ft 3 in) | UGB | (Senegal) |
| F | 8 | Mohamed Diop | 33 – 14 May 1981 | 1.98 m (6 ft 6 in) | UGB | (Senegal) |
| F | 9 | Maleye N'Doye | 34 – 19 August 1980 | 2.03 m (6 ft 8 in) | Paris-Levallois Basket | (France) |
| F | 10 | Djibril Thiam | 28 – 6 July 1986 | 2.06 m (6 ft 9 in) | Toyama Grouses | (Japan) |
| F | 11 | Mouhammad Faye | 28 – 14 September 1985 | 2.08 m (6 ft 10 in) | Panelefsiniakos | (Greece) |
| F | 12 | Maurice Ndour | 22 – 18 June 1992 | 2.06 m (6 ft 9 in) | Ohio Bobcats | (United States) |
| C | 13 | Hamady N'Diaye | 27 – 12 January 1987 | 2.13 m (7 ft 0 in) | Guangxi Rhinos | (China) |
| C | 14 | Gorgui Dieng | 24 – 18 January 1990 | 2.11 m (6 ft 11 in) | Minnesota Timberwolves | (United States) |
| F | 15 | Abdou Badji | 22 – 4 April 1992 | 2.06 m (6 ft 9 in) | Neuchâtel Basket | (Switzerland) |

Head coach

- (Senegal) Cheikh Sarr

Legend

- Club – describes last
  club before the tournament
- Age – describes age
  on 30 August 2014

== Group C ==
=== Dominican Republic ===
A 14-player squad was announced on 10 August 2014. The final 12-player roster was published on 26 August 2014.

Dominican Republic men's national basketball team - 2014 FIBA Basketball World Cup roster
Players
Coaches

| Pos. | No. | Name | Age – Date of birth | Height | Club |
|---|---|---|---|---|---|---|
| G | 4 | Édgar Sosa | 26 – 15 January 1988 | 1.85 m (6 ft 1 in) | Ratiopharm Ulm | (Germany) |
| G | 5 | Manuel Fortuna | 29 – 23 March 1985 | 1.88 m (6 ft 2 in) | Leones de Santo Domingo | (Dominican Republic) |
| G | 6 | Juan Coronado | 31 – 25 August 1983 | 1.85 m (6 ft 1 in) | Reales de La Vega | (Dominican Republic) |
| G | 7 | Víctor Liz | 28 – 12 May 1986 | 1.83 m (6 ft 0 in) | Metros de Santiago | (Dominican Republic) |
| F | 8 | Edward Santana | 26 – 14 September 1987 | 2.03 m (6 ft 8 in) | Cañeros del Este | (Dominican Republic) |
| F | 9 | Francisco García | 32 – 31 December 1981 | 2.00 m (6 ft 7 in) | Houston Rockets | (United States) |
| G | 10 | James Feldeine | 26 – 26 June 1988 | 1.93 m (6 ft 4 in) | Baloncesto Fuenlabrada | (Spain) |
| C | 11 | Eloy Vargas | 25 – 30 December 1988 | 2.11 m (6 ft 11 in) | Metros de Santiago | (Dominican Republic) |
| F | 12 | Orlando Sánchez | 26 – 26 May 1988 | 2.06 m (6 ft 9 in) | St. John's Red Storm | (United States) |
| F | 13 | Eulis Báez | 32 – 18 March 1982 | 1.98 m (6 ft 6 in) | Gran Canaria | (Spain) |
| G | 14 | Ronald Ramón | 28 – 14 January 1986 | 1.83 m (6 ft 0 in) | Winner Limeira | (Brazil) |
| F | 15 | Jack Michael Martínez | 32 – 12 October 1981 | 2.01 m (6 ft 7 in) | Leones de Santo Domingo | (Dominican Republic) |

Head coach

- Orlando Antigua

Assistant coach(es)

- José Mercedes
- Bill Bayno
- Ron Sánchez

Legend

- (C) Team captain
- Club – describes last
  club before the tournament
- Age – describes age
  on 30 August 2014

=== Finland ===
Finland announced its final roster on 20 August 2014.

Finland men's national basketball team - 2014 FIBA Basketball World Cup roster
Players
Coaches
}

| Pos. | No. | Name | Age – Date of birth | Height | Club |
|---|---|---|---|---|---|---|
| G | 4 | Mikko Koivisto | 27 – 18 April 1987 | 1.94 m (6 ft 4 in) | Gaziantep | (Turkey) |
| F | 5 | Erik Murphy | 23 – 26 October 1990 | 2.08 m (6 ft 10 in) | Utah Jazz | (United States) |
| F | 6 | Kimmo Muurinen | 33 – 23 February 1981 | 2.02 m (6 ft 8 in) | Tapiolan Honka | (Finland) |
| F | 7 | Shawn Huff | 30 – 5 May 1984 | 1.98 m (6 ft 6 in) | MHP Ludwigsburg | (Germany) |
| C | 8 | Gerald Lee | 26 – 23 November 1987 | 2.08 m (6 ft 10 in) | CSU Ploiești | (Romania) |
| G | 9 | Sasu Salin | 23 – 11 June 1991 | 1.91 m (6 ft 3 in) | Union Olimpija | (Slovenia) |
| C | 10 | Tuukka Kotti | 33 – 18 March 1981 | 2.05 m (6 ft 9 in) | Nilan Bisons | (Finland) |
| G | 11 | Petteri Koponen | 26 – 13 April 1988 | 1.94 m (6 ft 4 in) | BC Khimki | (Russia) |
| F | 12 | Matti Nuutinen | 24 – 6 May 1990 | 2.00 m (6 ft 7 in) | Nilan Bisons | (Finland) |
| F | 13 | Hanno Möttölä (C) | 37 – 9 September 1976 | 2.09 m (6 ft 10 in) | Helsinki Seagulls | (Finland) |
| G | 14 | Antero Lehto | 30 – 2 April 1984 | 1.85 m (6 ft 1 in) | Tampereen Pyrintö | (Finland) |
| G | 15 | Teemu Rannikko | 33 – 9 September 1980 | 1.89 m (6 ft 2 in) | Joensuun Kataja | (Finland) |

Head coach

- Henrik Dettmann

Assistant coach(es)

- Pekka Salminen
- Jukka Toijala
- Lassi Tuovi

Legend

- (C) Team captain
- Club – describes last
  club before the tournament
- Age – describes age
  on 30 August 2014

=== New Zealand ===
New Zealand announced its preliminary 24-man roster on 26 June 2014. Seven cuts were announced on 11 July. They named their final 12-man roster on 20 August.

New Zealand men's national basketball team - 2014 FIBA Basketball World Cup roster
Players
Coaches

| Pos. | No. | Name | Age – Date of birth | Height | Club |
|---|---|---|---|---|---|---|
| G | 4 | Lindsay Tait | 32 – 8 January 1982 | 1.90 m (6 ft 3 in) | Wellington Saints | (New Zealand) |
| G/F | 5 | Everard Bartlett | 28 – 6 February 1986 | 1.93 m (6 ft 4 in) | Hawke's Bay Hawks | (New Zealand) |
| SG | 6 | Kirk Penney | 33 – 23 November 1980 | 1.96 m (6 ft 5 in) | Trabzonspor | (Turkey) |
| F | 7 | Mika Vukona (C) | 32 – 13 May 1982 | 1.98 m (6 ft 6 in) | New Zealand Breakers | (New Zealand) |
| PG | 8 | Jarrod Kenny | 28 – 17 September 1985 | 1.86 m (6 ft 1 in) | Hawke's Bay Hawks | (New Zealand) |
| G | 9 | Corey Webster | 25 – 29 November 1988 | 1.88 m (6 ft 2 in) | New Zealand Breakers | (New Zealand) |
| SF | 10 | Thomas Abercrombie | 27 – 5 July 1987 | 1.98 m (6 ft 6 in) | New Zealand Breakers | (New Zealand) |
| PF | 11 | B. J. Anthony | 26 – 20 July 1988 | 1.98 m (6 ft 6 in) | Adelaide 36ers | (Australia) |
| F/C | 12 | Isaac Fotu | 20 – 18 December 1993 | 2.03 m (6 ft 8 in) | Hawaii Rainbow Warriors | (United States) |
| F/C | 13 | Casey Frank | 36 – 23 October 1977 | 2.03 m (6 ft 8 in) | Waikato Pistons | (New Zealand) |
| C | 14 | Rob Loe | 23 – 5 August 1991 | 2.11 m (6 ft 11 in) | Saint Louis Billikens | (United States) |
| G | 15 | Tai Webster | 19 – 29 May 1995 | 1.93 m (6 ft 4 in) | Nebraska Cornhuskers | (United States) |

Head coach

- (New Zealand) Nenad Vučinić

Assistant coach(es)

- (New Zealand) Paul Henare
- (New Zealand) Pero Cameron

Team manager/Trainer

- Claire Dallison

Assistant manager

- Michael Fitchett

Operations manager

- Peter Kadar

Legend

- (C) Team captain
- Club – describes last
  club before the tournament
- Age – describes age
  on 30 August 2014

=== Turkey ===
Turkey announced a 17-man training camp roster on 14 July 2014. Four other players, who were not at the training camp, were on the preliminary roster. Two were excused from camp, one was recovering from a minor surgery and one was on duty with the Turkey under-20 national team. By 14 August 2014, the roster was trimmed to 14. On 24 August 2014 the final roster was announced.

Turkey men's national basketball team - 2014 FIBA Basketball World Cup roster
Players
Coaches

| Pos. | No. | Name | Age – Date of birth | Height | Club |
|---|---|---|---|---|---|---|
| F | 4 | Cedi Osman | 19 – 8 April 1995 | 2.00 m (6 ft 7 in) | Anadolu Efes | (Turkey) |
| G | 5 | Sinan Güler | 30 – 8 November 1983 | 1.92 m (6 ft 4 in) | Galatasaray | (Turkey) |
| G | 6 | Barış Ermiş | 29 – 3 January 1985 | 1.94 m (6 ft 4 in) | Gaziantep | (Turkey) |
| F | 7 | Cenk Akyol | 27 – 16 April 1987 | 1.98 m (6 ft 6 in) | Galatasaray | (Turkey) |
| F | 8 | Barış Hersek | 26 – 26 March 1988 | 2.08 m (6 ft 10 in) | Pınar Karşıyaka | (Turkey) |
| F | 9 | Emir Preldžić | 26 – 6 September 1987 | 2.05 m (6 ft 9 in) | Fenerbahçe Ülker | (Turkey) |
| G | 10 | Kerem Tunçeri | 35 – 14 April 1979 | 1.88 m (6 ft 2 in) | Türk Telekom | (Turkey) |
| C | 11 | Oğuz Savaş | 27 – 13 July 1987 | 2.11 m (6 ft 11 in) | Fenerbahçe Ülker | (Turkey) |
| F | 12 | Kerem Gönlüm | 36 – 22 November 1977 | 2.09 m (6 ft 10 in) | Anadolu Efes | (Turkey) |
| G | 13 | Ender Arslan | 31 – 13 January 1983 | 1.85 m (6 ft 1 in) | Galatasaray | (Turkey) |
| C | 14 | Ömer Aşık | 28 – 4 July 1986 | 2.13 m (7 ft 0 in) | Houston Rockets | (United States) |
| C | 15 | Furkan Aldemir | 23 – 9 August 1991 | 2.07 m (6 ft 9 in) | Galatasaray | (Turkey) |

Head coach

- Ergin Ataman

Assistant coach(es)

- Ufuk Sarıca
- Yakup Sekizkök
- Ömer Uğurata

Legend

- (C) Team captain
- Club – describes last
  club before the tournament
- Age – describes age
  on 30 August 2014

=== Ukraine ===
The roster was announced on 27 August 2014.

Ukraine men's national basketball team - 2014 FIBA Basketball World Cup roster
Players
Coaches

| Pos. | No. | Name | Age – Date of birth | Height | Club |
|---|---|---|---|---|---|---|
| F | 4 | Maksym Pustozvonov | 27 – April 16, 1987 | 2.00 m (6 ft 7 in) | BC Azovmash | (Ukraine) |
| G | 5 | Eugene Jeter | 30 – December 2, 1983 | 1.80 m (5 ft 11 in) | Shandong Lions | (China) |
| G | 6 | Olexandr Mishula | 22 – April 18, 1992 | 1.88 m (6 ft 2 in) | BC Dnipro | (Ukraine) |
| G | 7 | Sviatoslav Mykhailiuk | 16 – October 6, 1997 | 1.99 m (6 ft 6 in) | Cherkaski Mavpy | (Ukraine) |
| G | 8 | Sergiy Gladyr | 24 – October 17, 1989 | 1.99 m (6 ft 6 in) | JSF Nanterre | (France) |
| G | 9 | Oleksandr Lypovyy | 22 – October 9, 1991 | 1.94 m (6 ft 4 in) | Red Star Belgrade | (Serbia) |
| C | 10 | Kyryl Natyazhko | 23 – November 30, 1990 | 2.07 m (6 ft 9 in) | BC Azovmash | (Ukraine) |
| G | 11 | Dmytro Zabirchenko | 30 – June 15, 1984 | 1.91 m (6 ft 3 in) | BC Azovmash | (Ukraine) |
| F | 12 | Maksym Korniyenko | 27 – June 26, 1987 | 2.07 m (6 ft 9 in) | BC Donetsk | (Ukraine) |
| C | 13 | Ihor Zaytsev | 25 – May 11, 1989 | 2.10 m (6 ft 11 in) | BC Azovmash | (Ukraine) |
| C | 14 | Artem Pustovyi | 22 – June 25, 1992 | 2.16 m (7 ft 1 in) | BC Khimik | (Ukraine) |
| C | 15 | Viacheslav Kravtsov | 27 – August 25, 1987 | 2.10 m (6 ft 11 in) | Phoenix Suns | (United States) |

Head coach

- Mike Fratello

Assistant coach(es)

- Bob Hill
- Denys Zhuravlov

Legend

- (C) Team captain
- Club – describes last
  club before the tournament
- Age – describes age
  on 30 August 2014

=== United States ===
United States men's national basketball team - 2014 FIBA Basketball World Cup roster
Players
Coaches

| Pos. | No. | Name | Age – Date of birth | Height | Club |
|---|---|---|---|---|---|---|
| G | 4 | Stephen Curry | 26 – 14 March 1988 | 1.91 m (6 ft 3 in) | Golden State Warriors | (United States) |
| G | 5 | Klay Thompson | 24 – 8 February 1990 | 2.01 m (6 ft 7 in) | Golden State Warriors | (United States) |
| G | 6 | Derrick Rose | 25 – 4 October 1988 | 1.91 m (6 ft 3 in) | Chicago Bulls | (United States) |
| F | 7 | Kenneth Faried | 24 – 19 November 1989 | 2.03 m (6 ft 8 in) | Denver Nuggets | (United States) |
| F | 8 | Rudy Gay | 28 – 17 August 1986 | 2.03 m (6 ft 8 in) | Sacramento Kings | (United States) |
| F | 9 | DeMar DeRozan | 25 – 7 August 1989 | 2.01 m (6 ft 7 in) | Toronto Raptors | (Canada) |
| G | 10 | Kyrie Irving | 22 – 23 March 1992 | 1.91 m (6 ft 3 in) | Cleveland Cavaliers | (United States) |
| C | 11 | Mason Plumlee | 24 – 5 March 1990 | 2.11 m (6 ft 11 in) | Brooklyn Nets | (United States) |
| C | 12 | DeMarcus Cousins | 24 – 13 August 1990 | 2.11 m (6 ft 11 in) | Sacramento Kings | (United States) |
| G | 13 | James Harden | 25 – 26 August 1989 | 1.96 m (6 ft 5 in) | Houston Rockets | (United States) |
| F | 14 | Anthony Davis | 21 – 11 March 1993 | 2.08 m (6 ft 10 in) | New Orleans Pelicans | (United States) |
| C | 15 | Andre Drummond | 21 – 10 August 1993 | 2.08 m (6 ft 10 in) | Detroit Pistons | (United States) |

Head coach

- Mike Krzyzewski

Assistant coach(es)

- Jim Boeheim
- Tom Thibodeau
- Monty Williams

Athletic Trainer

- Gregg Farnam
- Joe Sharpe

Managing director

- Jerry Colangelo

Legend

- (C) Team captain
- Club – describes last
  club before the tournament
- Age – describes age
  on 30 August 2014

== Group D ==
=== Angola ===
The 12-player roster was announced on 25 August 2014.

Angola men's national basketball team - 2014 FIBA Basketball World Cup roster
Players
Coaches

| Pos. | No. | Name | Age – Date of birth | Height | Club |
|---|---|---|---|---|---|---|
| G | 4 | Olímpio Cipriano | 32 – 9 April 1982 | 1.93 m (6 ft 4 in) | Recreativo do Libolo | (Angola) |
| G | 5 | Armando Costa | 31 – 3 June 1983 | 1.91 m (6 ft 3 in) | Primeiro de Agosto | (Angola) |
| G | 6 | Roberto Fortes | 29 – 9 November 1984 | 1.93 m (6 ft 4 in) | Petro Atlético | (Angola) |
| G | 7 | Edson Ndoniema | 23 – 11 February 1991 | 1.93 m (6 ft 4 in) | Petro Atlético | (Angola) |
| G | 8 | Hermenegildo Santos | 24 – 16 August 1990 | 1.89 m (6 ft 2 in) | Primeiro de Agosto | (Angola) |
| C | 9 | Valdelício Joaquim | 24 – 15 April 1990 | 2.09 m (6 ft 10 in) | Petro Atlético | (Angola) |
| C | 10 | Joaquim Gomes | 33 – 23 December 1980 | 2.02 m (6 ft 8 in) | Primeiro de Agosto | (Angola) |
| F | 11 | Reggie Moore | 33 – 31 March 1981 | 2.00 m (6 ft 7 in) | Primeiro de Agosto | (Angola) |
| C | 12 | Yanick Moreira | 23 – 31 July 1991 | 2.11 m (6 ft 11 in) | SMU Mustangs | (United States) |
| F | 13 | Islando Manuel | 23 – 7 January 1991 | 1.95 m (6 ft 5 in) | Primeiro de Agosto | (Angola) |
| G | 14 | Milton Barros | 30 – 21 June 1984 | 1.83 m (6 ft 0 in) | Interclube | (Angola) |
| F | 15 | Eduardo Mingas | 35 – 29 January 1979 | 1.98 m (6 ft 6 in) | Recreativo do Libolo | (Angola) |

Head coach

- (Angola) Paulo Macedo

Assistant coach(es)

- (Angola) Jaime Covilhã
- (Angola) Walter Costa

Legend

- Club – describes last
  club before the tournament
- Age – describes age
  on 30 August 2014

=== Australia ===
Basketball Australia announced its final World Cup roster on 28 July 2014.

Australia men's national basketball team - 2014 FIBA Basketball World Cup roster
Players
Coaches

| Pos. | No. | Name | Age – Date of birth | Height | Club |
|---|---|---|---|---|---|---|
| SG | 4 | Chris Goulding | 25 – 24 October 1988 | 1.92 m (6 ft 4 in) | Melbourne Tigers | (Australia) |
| SF | 5 | Ryan Broekhoff | 24 – 23 August 1990 | 2.01 m (6 ft 7 in) | Beşiktaş | (Turkey) |
| G | 6 | Adam Gibson | 27 – 30 October 1986 | 1.88 m (6 ft 2 in) | Adelaide 36ers | (Australia) |
| G/F | 7 | Joe Ingles | 26 – 2 October 1987 | 2.03 m (6 ft 8 in) | Utah Jazz | (United States) |
| G/F | 8 | Brad Newley | 29 – 18 February 1985 | 2.01 m (6 ft 7 in) | Gran Canaria | (Spain) |
| G | 9 | Matthew Dellavedova | 23 – 8 September 1990 | 1.93 m (6 ft 4 in) | Cleveland Cavaliers | (United States) |
| PF | 10 | Cameron Bairstow | 23 – 7 December 1990 | 2.06 m (6 ft 9 in) | Chicago Bulls | (United States) |
| G | 11 | Dante Exum | 19 – 13 July 1995 | 1.96 m (6 ft 5 in) | Utah Jazz | (United States) |
| C | 12 | Aron Baynes | 27 – 9 December 1986 | 2.08 m (6 ft 10 in) | Detroit Pistons | (United States) |
| F/C | 13 | David Andersen (C) | 34 – 23 June 1980 | 2.11 m (6 ft 11 in) | ASVEL Basket | (France) |
| F/C | 14 | Brock Motum | 23 – 16 October 1990 | 2.08 m (6 ft 10 in) | Adelaide 36ers | (Australia) |
| C | 15 | Nathan Jawai | 27 – 10 October 1986 | 2.08 m (6 ft 10 in) | BC Andorra | (Spain) |

Head coach

- (Australia) Andrej Lemanis

Assistant coach(es)

- (Australia) Trevor Gleeson
- (Australia) Mick Downer
- (Australia) Dr. Adrian Hurley
- (Australia) Luc Longley

Legend

- Club – describes last
  club played for
- Age – describes age
  on 30 August 2014

=== South Korea ===
The 12-man roster was announced on 1 August 2014.

Korea men's national basketball team - 2014 FIBA Basketball World Cup roster
Players
Coaches

| Pos. | No. | Name | Age – Date of birth | Height | Club |
|---|---|---|---|---|---|---|
| F | 4 | Moon Tae-jong | 38 – December 1, 1975 | 1.98 m (6 ft 6 in) | Changwon LG Sakers | (South Korea) |
| G | 5 | Park Chan-hee | 27 – April 17, 1987 | 1.90 m (6 ft 3 in) | Anyang KGC | (South Korea) |
| G | 6 | Yang Dong-geun (C) | 32 – September 14, 1981 | 1.81 m (5 ft 11 in) | Ulsan Mobis Phoebus | (South Korea) |
| G | 7 | Kim Tae-sul | 30 – August 13, 1984 | 1.80 m (5 ft 11 in) | Jeonju KCC Egis | (South Korea) |
| C | 8 | Lee Jong-hyun | 20 – February 5, 1994 | 2.06 m (6 ft 9 in) | Korea University | (South Korea) |
| G | 9 | Kim Sun-hyung | 26 – July 1, 1988 | 1.87 m (6 ft 2 in) | Seoul SK Knights | (South Korea) |
| G | 10 | Cho Sung-min | 30 – December 23, 1983 | 1.89 m (6 ft 2 in) | Busan KT Sonicboom | (South Korea) |
| F | 11 | Yang Hee-jong | 30 – May 11, 1984 | 1.94 m (6 ft 4 in) | Anyang KGC | (South Korea) |
| C | 12 | Kim Joo-sung | 34 – November 9, 1979 | 2.05 m (6 ft 9 in) | Wonju Dongbu Promy | (South Korea) |
| F | 13 | Heo Il-young | 29 – August 5, 1985 | 1.95 m (6 ft 5 in) | Goyang Orions | (South Korea) |
| C | 14 | Oh Se-keun | 27 – May 20, 1987 | 2.00 m (6 ft 7 in) | Sangmu | (South Korea) |
| C | 15 | Kim Jong-kyu | 23 – July 3, 1991 | 2.07 m (6 ft 9 in) | Changwon LG Sakers | (South Korea) |

Head coach

- (South Korea) Yoo Jae-hak

Assistant coach(es)

- (South Korea) Lee Sang-beom
- (South Korea) Lee Hun-jae

Legend

- Club – describes last
  club before the tournament
- Age – describes age
  on 30 August 2014

=== Lithuania ===
Lithuania head coach Jonas Kazlauskas announced a 17-man preliminary roster on 1 July 2014. The final 12-man squad was announced on 26 August 2014. After Mantas Kalnietis suffered a clavicular dislocation, Adas Juškevičius joined the final roster as a replacement.

Lithuania men's national basketball team - 2014 FIBA Basketball World Cup roster
Players
Coaches

| Pos. | No. | Name | Age – Date of birth | Height | Club |
|---|---|---|---|---|---|---|
| G | 4 | Martynas Pocius | 28 – 28 April 1986 | 1.96 m (6 ft 5 in) | Žalgiris Kaunas | (Lithuania) |
| G | 5 | Adas Juškevičius | 25 – 3 January 1989 | 1.94 m (6 ft 4 in) | Eisbären Bremerhaven | (Germany) |
| F | 6 | Mindaugas Kuzminskas | 24 – 19 October 1989 | 2.04 m (6 ft 8 in) | Unicaja Málaga | (Spain) |
| C | 7 | Darjuš Lavrinovič | 34 – 1 November 1979 | 2.12 m (6 ft 11 in) | Budivelnyk Kiev | (Ukraine) |
| F | 8 | Jonas Mačiulis | 29 – 10 February 1985 | 1.98 m (6 ft 6 in) | Panathinaikos | (Greece) |
| G | 9 | Renaldas Seibutis | 29 – 23 July 1985 | 1.96 m (6 ft 5 in) | Lietuvos Rytas | (Lithuania) |
| F | 10 | Simas Jasaitis | 32 – 26 March 1982 | 2.01 m (6 ft 7 in) | Lokomotiv Kuban | (Russia) |
| F | 11 | Donatas Motiejūnas | 23 – 20 September 1990 | 2.13 m (7 ft 0 in) | Houston Rockets | (United States) |
| F | 12 | Kšyštof Lavrinovič | 34 – 1 November 1979 | 2.10 m (6 ft 11 in) | Valencia | (Spain) |
| F | 13 | Paulius Jankūnas | 30 – 29 April 1984 | 2.05 m (6 ft 9 in) | Žalgiris Kaunas | (Lithuania) |
| C | 14 | Jonas Valančiūnas | 22 – 6 May 1992 | 2.11 m (6 ft 11 in) | Toronto Raptors | (Canada) |
| G | 15 | Šarūnas Vasiliauskas | 25 – 27 March 1989 | 1.88 m (6 ft 2 in) | Trefl Sopot | (Poland) |

Head coach

- Jonas Kazlauskas

Assistant coach(es)

- Darius Maskoliūnas
- Gintaras Krapikas

Legend

- Club – describes last
  club before the tournament
- Age – describes age
  on 30 August 2014

=== Mexico ===
Mexico men's national basketball team - 2014 FIBA Basketball World Cup roster
Players
Coaches

| Pos. | No. | Name | Age – Date of birth | Height | Club |
|---|---|---|---|---|---|---|
| G | 4 | Paul Stoll | 28 – 14 December 1985 | 1.80 m (5 ft 11 in) | Gigantes de Guayana | (Venezuela) |
| F | 5 | Marco Ramos | 27 – 26 February 1987 | 1.98 m (6 ft 6 in) | Halcones Rojos Veracruz | (Mexico) |
| F | 6 | Román Martínez | 26 – 5 March 1988 | 2.01 m (6 ft 7 in) | Soles de Mexicali | (Mexico) |
| G | 7 | Jorge Gutiérrez | 25 – 27 December 1988 | 1.90 m (6 ft 3 in) | Brooklyn Nets | (United States) |
| C | 8 | Gustavo Ayón (C) | 29 – 1 April 1985 | 2.06 m (6 ft 9 in) | Atlanta Hawks | (United States) |
| F | 9 | Francisco Cruz | 24 – 3 October 1989 | 1.91 m (6 ft 3 in) | Halcones Rojos Veracruz | (Mexico) |
| C | 10 | Israel Gutiérrez | 21 – 15 January 1993 | 2.06 m (6 ft 9 in) | Halcones Rojos Veracruz | (Mexico) |
| G | 11 | Pedro Meza | 28 – 15 October 1985 | 1.86 m (6 ft 1 in) | Halcones de Xalapa | (Mexico) |
| C | 12 | Héctor Hernández | 29 – 15 June 1985 | 2.04 m (6 ft 8 in) | Atleticos de San German | (Puerto Rico) |
| G | 13 | Orlando Méndez-Valdez | 28 – 29 April 1986 | 1.83 m (6 ft 0 in) | Halcones de Xalapa | (Mexico) |
| F | 14 | Adrian Zamora | 27 – 28 October 1986 | 2.00 m (6 ft 7 in) | Halcones Rojos Veracruz | (Mexico) |
| C | 15 | Adam Parada | 32 – 21 October 1981 | 2.08 m (6 ft 10 in) | Halcones de Xalapa | (Mexico) |

Head coach

- (Spain) Sergio Valdeolmillos

Assistant coach(es)

- (Mexico) Javier Ceniceros
- (Mexico) Ramón Díaz

Legend

- Club – describes last
  club before the tournament
- Age – describes age
  on 30 August 2014

=== Slovenia ===
A preliminary roster was published on 15 July 2014.

Slovenia men's national basketball team - 2014 FIBA Basketball World Cup roster
Players
Coaches

| Pos. | No. | Name | Age – Date of birth | Height | Club |
|---|---|---|---|---|---|---|
| F | 4 | Jure Balažič | 33 – 12 September 1980 | 2.04 m (6 ft 8 in) | Tofaş Bursa | (Turkey) |
| F | 5 | Uroš Slokar | 31 – 14 May 1983 | 2.10 m (6 ft 11 in) | Estudiantes | (Spain) |
| G | 6 | Aleksej Nikolić | 19 – 21 February 1995 | 1.91 m (6 ft 3 in) | OKK Spars Sarajevo | (Bosnia and Herzegovina) |
| G | 7 | Klemen Prepelič | 21 – 20 October 1992 | 1.91 m (6 ft 3 in) | Banvit | (Turkey) |
| F | 8 | Edo Murić | 22 – 27 November 1991 | 2.03 m (6 ft 8 in) | Krka | (Slovenia) |
| G | 9 | Jaka Blažič | 24 – 30 June 1990 | 1.96 m (6 ft 5 in) | Red Star Belgrade | (Serbia) |
| F | 10 | Miha Zupan | 31 – 13 September 1982 | 2.05 m (6 ft 9 in) | Uşak | (Turkey) |
| G | 11 | Goran Dragić (C) | 28 – 6 May 1986 | 1.91 m (6 ft 3 in) | Phoenix Suns | (United States) |
| G | 12 | Zoran Dragić | 25 – 22 June 1989 | 1.96 m (6 ft 5 in) | Unicaja Málaga | (Spain) |
| G | 13 | Domen Lorbek | 29 – 6 March 1985 | 1.98 m (6 ft 6 in) | Royal Halı Gaziantep | (Turkey) |
| G | 14 | Jaka Klobučar | 27 – 19 August 1987 | 1.98 m (6 ft 6 in) | Krka | (Slovenia) |
| C | 15 | Alen Omić | 22 – 6 May 1992 | 2.15 m (7 ft 1 in) | Union Olimpija | (Slovenia) |

Head coach

- Jure Zdovc

Assistant coach(es)

- Gašper Potočnik
- Stefanos Dedas
- Chris Thomas

Legend

- (C) Team captain
- Club – describes last
  club before the tournament
- Age – describes age
  on 30 August 2014

== Players per national domestic league ==
| League | Federation | Total | % | Notes |
|---|---|---|---|---|
| National Basketball Association | (United States) USA Basketball | 45 | 15.6% | Includes 1 team from Canada |
| Liga ACB | (Spain) Spanish Basketball Federation | 28 | 9.7% | |
| Turkish Basketball Super League | (Turkey) Turkish Basketball Federation | 26 | 9.0% | |
| Egyptian Basketball Super League | (Egypt) Egyptian Basketball Federation | 12 | 4.2% | |
| Iranian Basketball Super League | Islamic Republic of Iran Basketball Federation | 12 | 4.2% | |
| Korean Basketball League | (South Korea) Korea Basketball Association | 12 | 4.2% | |
| BAI Basket | (Angola) Angolan Basketball Federation | 11 | 3.8% | |
| Philippine Basketball Association | (Philippines) Samahang Basketbol ng Pilipinas | 11 | 3.8% | |
| Baloncesto Superior Nacional | (Puerto Rico) Puerto Rican Basketball Federation | 11 | 3.8% | |
| VTB United League | (Russia) Russian Basketball Federation* | 9 | 3.1% | Includes 10 teams from other countries |
| Basketball League of Serbia | Basketball Federation of Serbia | 9 | 3.1% | |
| Ukrainian Basketball SuperLeague | (Ukraine) Ukrainian Basketball Federation | 9 | 3.1% | |
| Liga Nacional de Baloncesto Profesional | (Mexico) Mexican Basketball Federation | 8 | 2.8% | |
| NCAA Division I | (United States) USA Basketball | 8 | 2.8% | |
| Liga Nacional de Básquet | (Argentina) Argentine Basketball Federation | 7 | 2.4% | |
| Novo Basquete Brasil | (Brazil) Brazilian Basketball Confederation | 7 | 2.4% | |
| LNB Pro A | (France) Fédération Française de Basket-Ball | 7 | 2.4% | |
| National Basketball League | Basketball Australia | 6 | 2.1% | Includes 1 team from New Zealand |
| Liga Nacional de Baloncesto | (Dominican Republic) Federación Dominicana de Baloncesto | 6 | 2.1% | |
| Greek Basket League | (Greece) Hellenic Basketball Federation | 6 | 2.1% | |
| Korisliiga | (Finland) Finnish Basketball Association | 5 | 1.7% | |
| National Basketball League | Basketball New Zealand | 4 | 1.4% | |
| Premier A Slovenian Basketball League | Basketball Federation of Slovenia | 4 | 1.4% | |
| Basketball Bundesliga | (Germany) Deutscher Basketball Bund* | 3 | 1.0% | |
| Lietuvos krepšinio lyga | (Lithuania) Lithuanian Basketball Federation | 3 | 1.0% | |
| A-1 Liga | (Croatia) Croatian Basketball Federation | 2 | 0.7% | |
| Senegalese Division I Basketball League | Senegal Basketball Federation | 2 | 0.7% | |
| Australian Schools Championships | Basketball Australia | 1 | 0.3% | |
| Basketball Championship of Bosnia and Herzegovina | Basketball Federation of Bosnia and Herzegovina* | 1 | 0.3% | |
| Chinese Basketball Association | (China) Chinese Basketball Association* | 1 | 0.3% | not counting 2 Iranian players who also played in Iran in 2013-2014 |
| National Basketball League | (China) Chinese Basketball Association* | 1 | 0.3% | Second-level league |
| Cyprus Basketball Division 1 | Cyprus Basketball Federation* | 1 | 0.3% | |
| I-divisioona A | (Finland) Finnish Basketball Association | 1 | 0.3% | Second-level league |
| Nationale Masculine 1 | (France) Fédération Française de Basket-Ball | 1 | 0.3% | Third-level league |
| Israeli Basketball Premier League | Israel Basketball Association* | 1 | 0.3% | |
| Lega Basket Serie A | (Italy) Federazione Italiana Pallacanestro* | 1 | 0.3% | |
| bj league | Japan Basketball Association* | 1 | 0.3% | |
| Kuwait Basketball League | Kuwait Basketball Association* | 1 | 0.3% | |
| Polish Basketball League | (Poland) Polski Związek Koszykówki* | 1 | 0.3% | |
| Liga Națională | (Romania) Romanian Basketball Association* | 1 | 0.3% | |
| Ligue Nationale de Basketball | (Switzerland) Swiss Basketball Federation* | 1 | 0.3% | |
| Liga Profesional de Baloncesto | (Venezuela) Venezuelan Basketball Federation* | 1 | 0.3% | |
| Total | | 288 | | |

* country did not qualify
