= Basketball at the 2005 Mediterranean Games =

The Basketball Tournament at the 2005 Mediterranean Games was held in the El Ejido Sports Hall from Friday June 24 to Friday July 1, 2005 in Almería, Spain.

== Men's competition ==
=== Teams ===
Group A

- Algeria
- Egypt
- Italy
- Spain

Group B

- Bosnia and Herzegovina
- Greece
- Morocco
- Turkey

=== Rosters ===
*(In parentheses is reported the year of birth)

Algeria: Karim Atamna (80), Farid Belhimeur (84), Moured Boughedir (76), Sofiane Boulaya (73), Ali Bouziane (77), Djillali Canon (78), Farouk Djillali (78), Redouane Fergati (78), Abdelhalim Kaouane (81), Nadjim Ouali (71), Tarek Oukid (79), Abdelhalim Sayah (75)

Bosnia & Herzegovina: Edin Bavčić (84), Dejan Ćup (83), Nikola Đurasović (83), Bojan Đurica (83), Aldin Kadić (86), Armend Kahrimanović (80), Muris Memić (81), Miloš Mirković (83), Edin Nurkanović (82), Mujo Tuljković (79), Emir Zimić (86)

Egypt: Ibrahim Adawi (74), Ismail Ahmed (76), Wael Badr (78), Amir Fanan (80), Tarek El Ghannam (78), Samir El Hosseny (76), Mohamed El Kerdany (77), Sherif Genedy (79), Ramy Gunady (81), Ahmed Monir, Ahmed Sakr (75), Abdelaziz Sherif

Greece: Nikos Barlos (79), Tasos Charismidis (81), Dimitrios Charitopoulos (83), Georgios Dedas (80), Ioannis Georgallis (83), Savvas Iliadis (79), Panagiotis Kafkis (80), Fanis Koumpouras (83), Nikos Papanikolopoulos (79), Angelos Siamandouras (80), Christos Tapoutos (82), Georgios Tsiakos (82)

Italy: Giorgio Boscagin (83), Marco Carraretto (77), Alessandro Cittadini (79), Christian Di Giuliomaria (79), Luca Garri (82), Jacopo Giachetti (83), Davide Lamma (76), Marco Mordente (79), Andrea Pecile (80), Tomas Ress (80), Mason Rocca (77), Walter Santarossa (78)

Morocco: Adil Baba (77), Nabil Bakkass (79), Mounir Bouhelal (79), Jaouad Dahbi (85), Alaeddine El Asli (84), Zakaria El Masbahi (79), Marouane El Mouttalibi (82), Mohamed Hjira (81), M.F. Houari Bassim (77), Mustapha Khalfi (80), Mohamed Mouak (78), Reda Rhalimi (82)

Spain: Alfons Alzamora (79), Germán Gabriel (80), Roberto Guerra (83), Rafa Martínez (82), Andrés Miso (83), Álex Mumbrú (79), Rubén Quintana (80), Guille Rubio (82), Fernando San Emeterio (84), Sergio Sánchez Cárdenas (81), Jordi Trias (80), Rafael Vidaurreta (77)

Turkey: Ender Arslan (83), Fırat Aydemir (80), Volkan Çetintahra (81), Hüseyin Demiral (78), Ermal Kurtoğlu (80), Reha Öz (78), Barış Özcan (81), Cevher Özer (83), Valentin Pastal (84), Kaya Peker (80), Kerem Tunçeri (79), Erkan Veyseloğlu (83)

=== Preliminary round ===
==== Group A ====
| | Team | Points | G | W | D | L | GF | GA | Diff |
|---|---|---|---|---|---|---|---|---|---|
| 1. | Italy | 6 | 3 | 3 | 0 | 0 | 246 | 191 | +55 |
| 2. | Spain | 5 | 3 | 2 | 0 | 1 | 243 | 219 | +24 |
| 3. | Egypt | 4 | 3 | 1 | 0 | 2 | 210 | 237 | −27 |
| 4. | Algeria | 3 | 3 | 0 | 0 | 3 | 183 | 235 | −52 |

- Friday June 24, 2005

| Italy | 80 – 67 | Egypt |
| Spain | 83 – 62 | Algeria |

- Saturday June 25, 2005

| Italy | 80 – 50 | Algeria |
| Spain | 86 – 71 | Egypt |

- Monday June 27, 2005

| Algeria | 71 – 72 | Egypt |
| Spain | 74 – 86 | Italy |

==== Group B ====
| | Team | Points | G | W | D | L | GF | GA | Diff |
|---|---|---|---|---|---|---|---|---|---|
| 1. | Greece | 5 | 3 | 2 | 0 | 1 | 258 | 187 | +71 |
| 2. | Turkey | 5 | 3 | 2 | 0 | 1 | 237 | 214 | +23 |
| 3. | Bosnia and Herzegovina | 5 | 3 | 2 | 0 | 1 | 200 | 210 | −10 |
| 4. | Morocco | 3 | 3 | 0 | 0 | 3 | 189 | 273 | −84 |

- Saturday June 25, 2005

| Turkey | 85 – 67 | Morocco |
| Greece | 74 – 49 | Bosnia and Herzegovina |

- Sunday June 26, 2005

| Greece | 115 – 60 | Morocco |
| Turkey | 74 – 78 | Bosnia and Herzegovina |

- Tuesday June 28, 2005

| Greece | 69 – 78 | Turkey |
| Bosnia and Herzegovina | 73 – 62 | Morocco |

=== Final round ===
Semi-finals
Greece | 88
Spain | 77
Italy | 79
Turkey | 69

Final
Greece | 86
Italy | 87
Third place
Spain | 84
Turkey | 70

=== Semi finals ===
- Thursday June 30, 2005

| Greece | 88 – 77 | Spain |
| Italy | 79 – 69 | Turkey |

=== Finals ===
- Wednesday June 29, 2005 — 7th/8th place

| Algeria | 83 – 67 | Morocco |

- Wednesday June 29, 2005 — 5th/6th place

| Egypt | 76 – 75 | Bosnia and Herzegovina |

- Friday July 1, 2005 — Bronze Medal Match

| Spain | 84 – 70 | Turkey |

- Sunday July 3, 2005 — Gold Medal Match

| Greece | 86 – 87 | Italy |

=== Final ranking ===
| Rank | Team |
|---|---|
| Gold medal | Italy |
| Silver medal | Greece |
| Bronze medal | Spain |
| 4. | Turkey |
| 5. | Egypt |
| 6. | Bosnia and Herzegovina |
| 7. | Algeria |
| 8. | Morocco |

=== Awards ===
2005 Men's Mediterranean Games champions

Italy

=== See also ===
- EuroBasket 2005
- FIBA Africa Championship 2005

== Women's competition ==
=== Teams ===
Group A

- Croatia
- Greece
- Italy

Group B

- France
- Spain
- Turkey

=== Rosters ===
---

=== Preliminary round ===
==== Group A ====
| | Team | Points | G | W | D | L | GF | GA | Diff |
|---|---|---|---|---|---|---|---|---|---|
| 1. | Croatia | 4 | 2 | 2 | 0 | 0 | 141 | 103 | +83 |
| 2. | Greece | 3 | 2 | 1 | 0 | 1 | 123 | 137 | −14 |
| 3. | Italy | 2 | 2 | 0 | 0 | 2 | 132 | 156 | −24 |

==== Group B ====
| | Team | Points | G | W | D | L | GF | GA | Diff |
|---|---|---|---|---|---|---|---|---|---|
| 1. | Turkey | 4 | 2 | 2 | 0 | 0 | 152 | 133 | +18 |
| 2. | Spain | 3 | 2 | 1 | 0 | 1 | 134 | 136 | −2 |
| 3. | France | 2 | 2 | 0 | 0 | 2 | 130 | 147 | −17 |

=== Final round ===
Semi-finals
Croatia | 85
Spain | 65
Turkey | 85
Greece | 60

Final
Croatia | 66
Turkey | 68
Third place
Spain | 68
Greece | 51

=== Finals ===
- Wednesday June 29, 2005 — 5th/6th place

| France | 65 – 70 | Italy |

- Friday July 1, 2005 — Bronze Medal Match

| Greece | 51 – 68 | Spain |

- Friday July 1, 2005 — Gold Medal Match

| Turkey | 68 – 66 | Croatia |

=== Final ranking ===
| Rank | Team |
|---|---|
| Gold medal | Turkey |
| Silver medal | Croatia |
| Bronze medal | Spain |
| 4. | Greece |
| 5. | Italy |
| 6. | France |

=== Awards ===
2005 Women's Mediterranean Games champions

Turkey

=== See also ===
- EuroBasket 2005 Women
