= Maccabi World Union =

International Jewish sports organisation

- Original Maccabi logo
- Formation: 1921
- Type: INGO
- Headquarters: Kfar Maccabiah
- Location: Ramat Gan, Israel
- Region served: Worldwide
- President: Jeanne Futeran
- Website: maccabi.org

Maccabi World Union is an international Jewish sports organisation spanning five continents (Africa, North America, South America, Australia, Europe) and more than 50 countries, with some 400,000 members. The Maccabi World Union organises the Maccabiah Games, a prominent international Jewish athletics event.

The organisation comprises six confederations: Maccabi Israel, European Maccabi confederation, confederation Maccabi North America, confederation Maccabi Latin America, Maccabi South Africa, and Maccabi Australia.

== Etymology ==
The movement is named after the Maccabees (Hebrew: מכבים or מקבים, Makabim) who were a Jewish national liberation movement that fought for and won independence from Antiochus IV Epiphanes. Ironically, at the time the Maccabees were staunchly opposed to athletic competitions, part of the Hellenizing cultural tendencies which they opposed. Athletic competitions held in Jerusalem under the Seleucid rule were terminated once the Maccabees took over the city.

== History ==
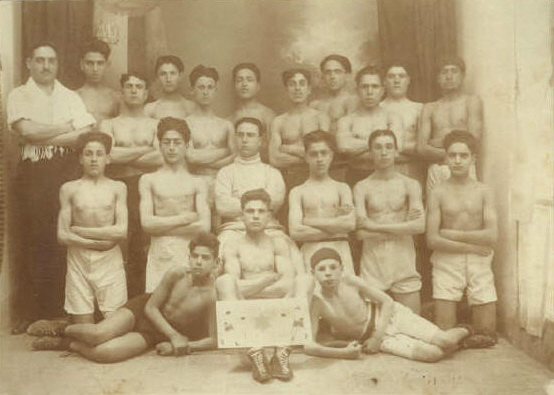
Maccabi boxing club, Tunisia, 1923

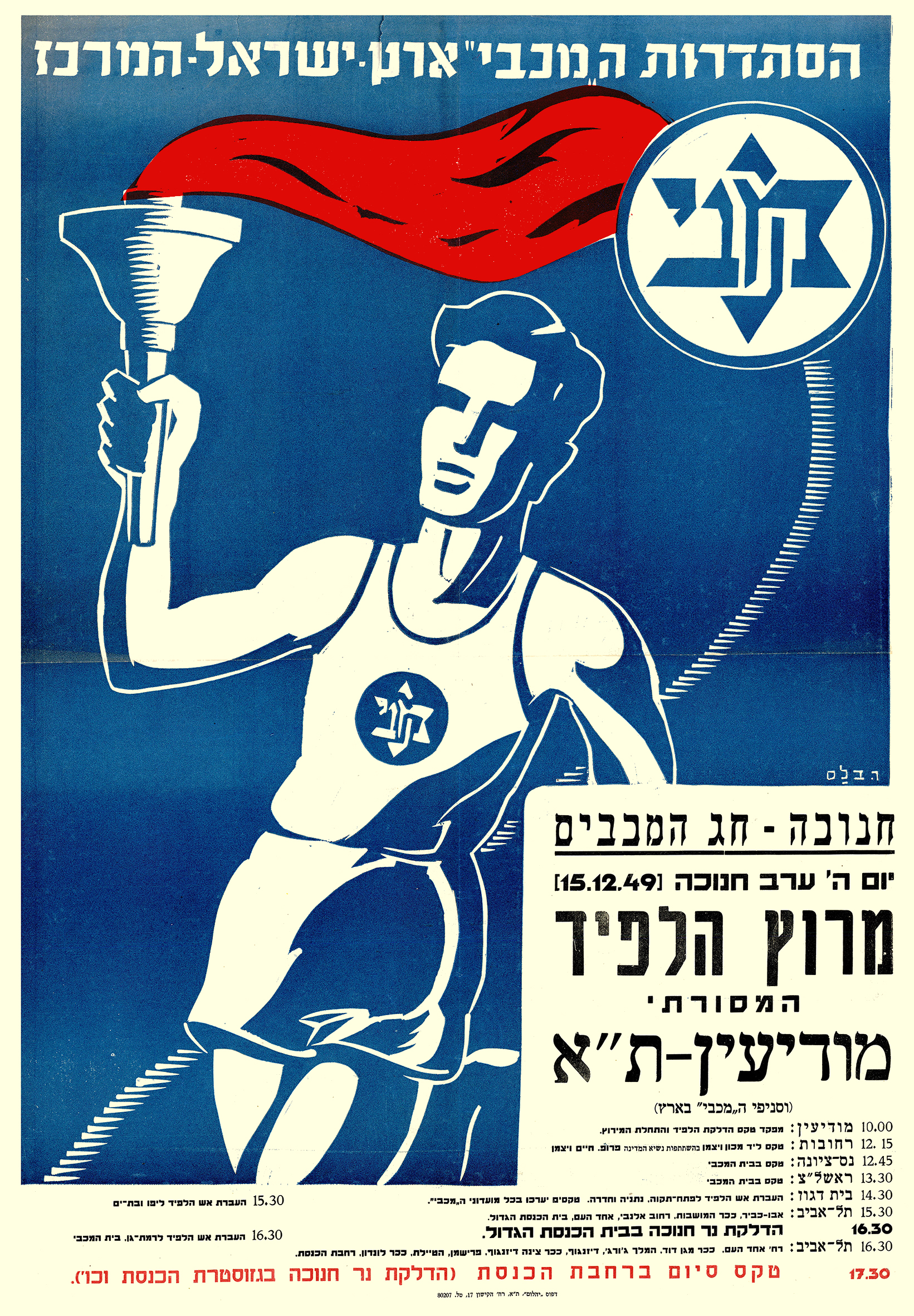
Advertisement for the famed "Torch Trail" held by Maccabi youth movement in 1949

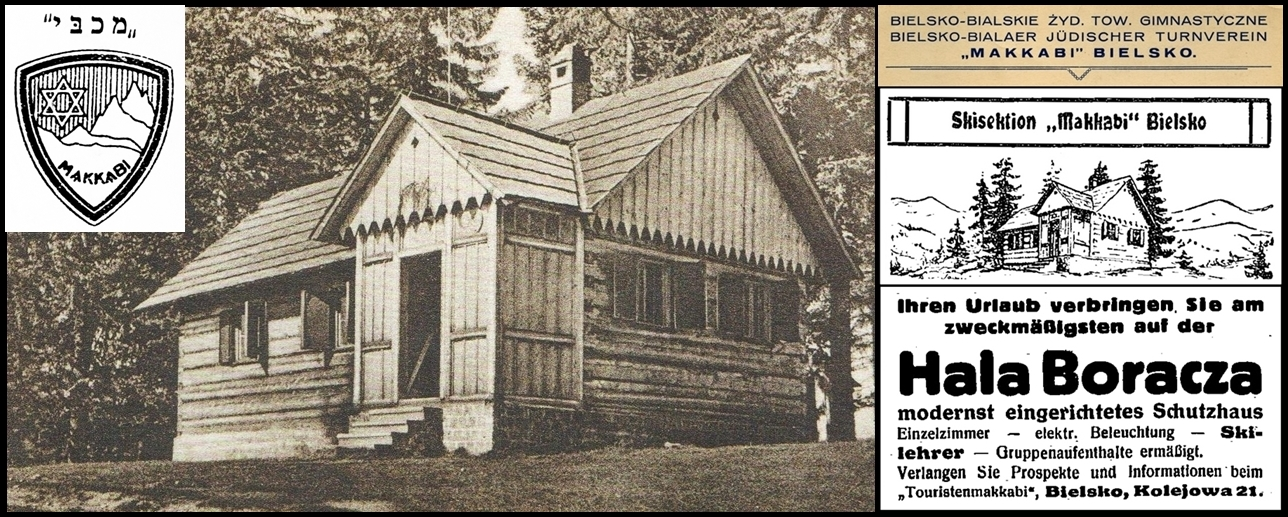
First Jewish tourist mountain hostel Makkabi Bielsko 1929 on Hala Boracza

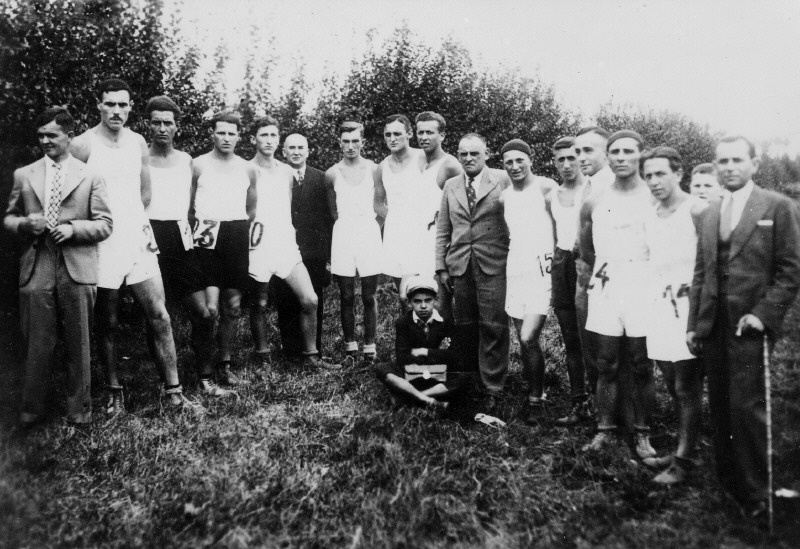
Maccabi football team, Łowicz, c. 1930

As early as the 19th century, Jewish sports clubs were founded in Eastern and Central Europe. The first club was the Israelite Gymnastic Association Constantinople (German: Israelitischer Turnverein Konstantinopel) founded in 1895 in Istanbul, Turkey by Jews of German and Austrian extraction who had been rejected from participating in other social sport clubs. Two years later, haGibor was formed in Plovdiv, Bulgaria, and 1898 saw the founding of Bar Kochba Berlin along with Vivó és Athletikai Club in Budapest, Hungary.

Other clubs that followed were named after “Bar Kochba” or Hebrew names such as “Hakoah” or “Hagibor” that symbolized strength and heroism. One of the basic premises behind the founding of these clubs was Jewish Nationalism, and specifically "Muscular Judaism". The concept was that Jews were not only a religious entity, but also one based on a common historical and social background, having special cultural and psychological concepts that have been preserved to this day, resulting in a strong recognition of collective belonging. At Kraków, Poland there was during the interwar period a deep animosity between the locally based Makkabi Kraków club and the rival Jewish club Jutrzenka Kraków, associated with the Bund political party.

While both clubs shared in the above aspiration to demonstrate a Jewish physical strength, they had divergent political programs - the one sharing in the Zionist aspiration of creating a Jewish state in Palestine, while the other was oriented to the Bundist program of Jewish cultural autonomy in Europe. This political opposition exacerbated their athletic rivalry between fans and players, to the point that matches between the two teams were generally referred to as a "Holy War".

In 1906, the first Jewish gymnastics club was formed in British Palestine. Clubs later would spring up in other cities. By 1912, all of them joined the Maccabi Federation of Israel. That same year, the first relations were established between them and their European counterparts, when a decision was taken at the Maccabi Conference in Berlin to begin group trips to British Palestine.

Maccabi Cairo was a Jewish sports club for the Jews in Egypt based in Cairo that was active from 1932 until 1956. It was affiliated with the Maccabi World Union. The club had a number of branches and sports sections—including basketball and football. Its end was spurred by political upheaval and the exodus of Egypt's Jewish population.

Maccabi GB is a member of the English National Council for Voluntary Youth Services (NCVYS) because of its work promoting the personal and social development of young people.

The Maccabi World Union was created at the 12th World Jewish Congress in Karlovy Vary, Czechoslovakia in 1921. It was then decided by the secretariat of Jewish sport leaders to form one umbrella organization for all Jewish sports associations. Its aims were defined as working "foster physical education, belief in Jewish heritage and the Jewish nation, and to work actively for the rebuilding of our own country and for the preservation of our people". In 1960, the International Olympic Committee officially recognized the Maccabi World Union as an "Organization of Olympic Standing".

In 2024, the Maccabi World Union signed a multi-million shekel agreement with the Israeli government to contribute to Israel's world-wide public relations effort.

== See also ==
- Maccabiah Games
- Maccabi Hatzair
- Hapoel
- European Maccabi Games 2015
- Sports in Israel
