= Maccabi Hatzair =

Zionist youth movement established in 1929

Maccabi youth מכבי צעיר
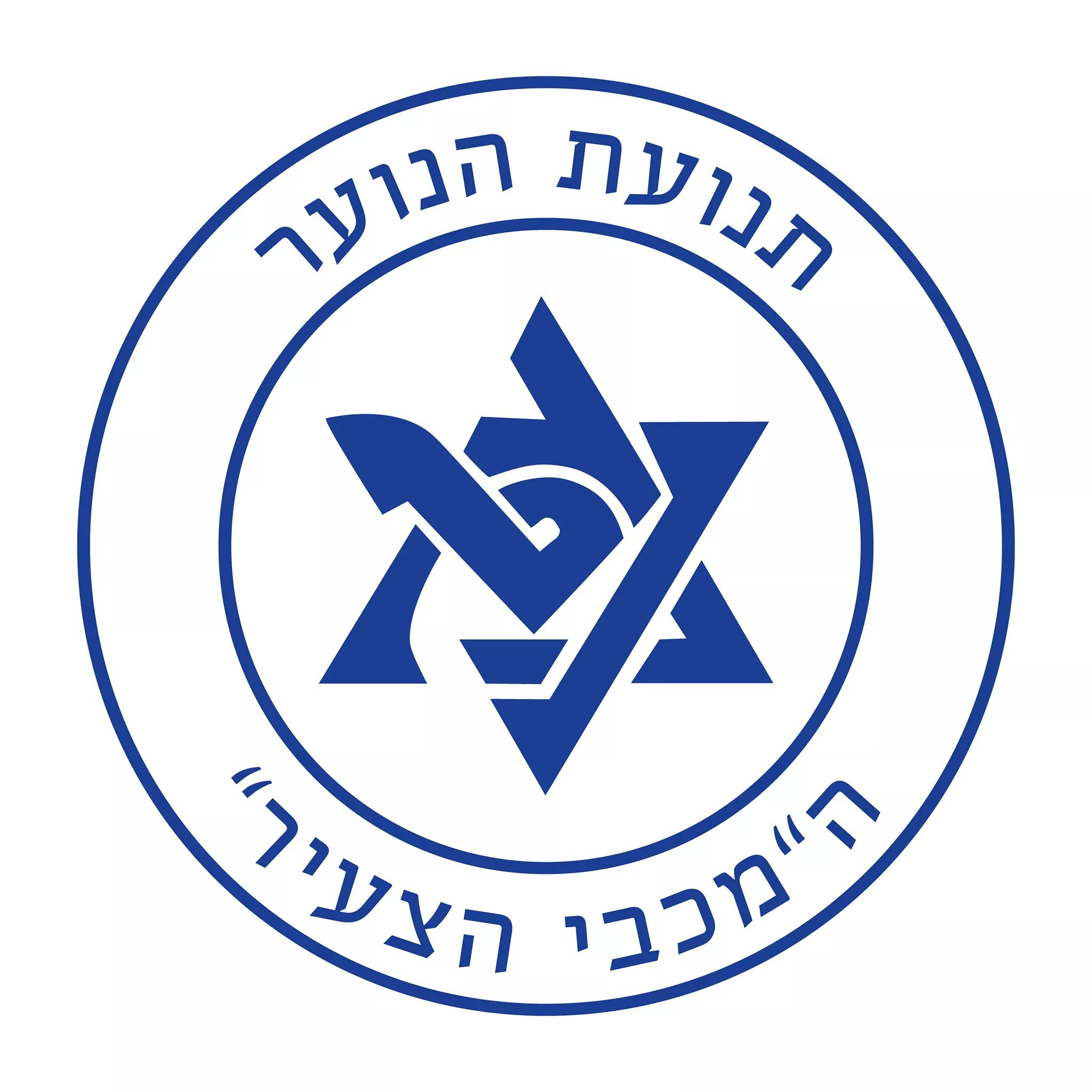
- Formation: 1929
- Type: Jewish Youth Movement
- Purpose: Educational
- Members: Youth
- General Secretary (Heb. Mazkir Klali): Elad Cohen
- Parent organization: Maccabi World Union
- Website: www.mtz.org.il

Maccabi Hatzair, also known as Young Maccabi or the Maccabi youth movement (Hebrew: המכבי הצעיר, HaMaccabi HaTza'ir), is a Zionist youth movement established during the international convention of the Maccabi World Union in Prague, Czech Republic in 1929. As the larger Maccabi movement is involved with promoting physical activity and sports among the Jewish people, the Maccabi youth movement was designated to focus on the informal education of the young generation, in light of the vision of Max Nordau and the idea of "Muscular Judaism".

== History ==
Maccabi Hatzair originally began as a sports organization under the central umbrella organization HeHalutz which coordinated training centres of young Jewish "pioneers" to prepare for life in Palestine in the 1920s. Maccabi Hatzair was established independently in 1932.
