= Marco Carraretto =

Italian basketball player (born 1977)

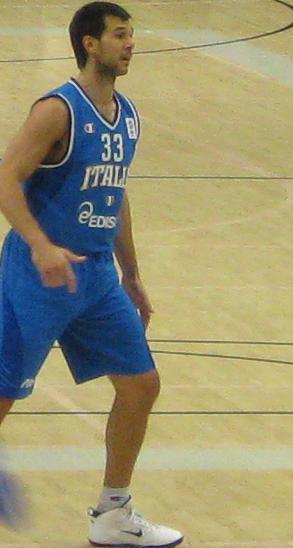
- Carraretto with the Italian national team

Scaligera Verona
- Position: Shooting guard / small forward
- League: Legadue Basket

Personal information
- Born: October 27, 1977 (age 49) Treviso, Italy
- Listed height: 6 ft 5.75 in (1.97 m)
- Listed weight: 210 lb (95 kg)

Career information
- Playing career: 1996–present

Career history
- 1996–1997: Benetton Treviso
- 1997–1999: Basket Mestre
- 1999–2001: Snaidero Udine
- 2001–2002: Scaligera Verona
- 2002–2004: Pallacanestro Biella
- 2004: TAU Cerámica
- 2004–2006: Breogan Lugo
- 2006–2013: Montepaschi Siena
- 2013-2014: Scaligera Verona
- 2015–2016: Fortitudo Bologna
Medals
Men's basketball
Representing Italy
Mediterranean Games
Gold medal – first place	2005 Almería	National Team

Marco Carraretto (born October 27, 1977) is an Italian former professional basketball player for Fortitudo Bologna and other teams in Italy. He is a 1.97 m (6 ft 5¾ in) tall, 95 kg shooting guard-small forward.

== Professional career ==
Carraretto began his pro career with the Italian League club Benetton Basket Treviso during the 1996-97 season. He then moved to Basket Mestre. He then joined Snaidero Udine, followed by Muller Verona, and then Pallacanestro Biella.

He then moved to the Spanish ACB League club TAU Cerámica, before moving to Breogan Lugo. He then joined Montepaschi Siena and stayed there for seven seasons.

In September 2013, he returned to his former club Scaligera Verona.

== Italian national team ==
Carraretto played with the Italian national basketball team at the 2005 Mediterranean Games, where he won the gold medal.
