= Mario Blasone =

Italian basketball player and coach (1940–2026)

Mario Blasone (3 March 1940 – 4 January 2026) was an Italian basketball player and coach.

== Biography ==
Blasone was born on 3 March 1940, and began his career in 1966 with U.S. Palermo in Serie B. Between 1969/1970, he played for Virtus Ragusa in Serie C.

In 1985, he began coaching, with the Italian national team. In 1991, he coached Scaligera in Serie A2. During 1998, he coached several national teams including Egypt, Saudi Arabia, and the United Arab Emirates.

Blasone died on 4 January 2026, at the age of 85.
