= Maccabi Cairo =

Former Jewish sports club

- Sports: Basketball, football
- Founded: 1932
- Dissolved: 1956
- Association: Maccabi World Union
- Location: Cairo, Egypt
- Colors: Blue and white

Maccabi Cairo was a Jewish sports club for the Jews in Egypt based in Cairo, Egypt, that was active from 1932 until 1956. It was affiliated with the Maccabi World Union Jewish sports movement. The club had a number of branches and sports sections—including basketball and football. Its high points in Egyptian basketball were during the 1940s and 1950s. It then dissolved, its end spurred by political upheaval and the exodus of Egypt's Jewish population.

== History ==
Maccabi Cairo was established in 1932 as a sports club for the Jews in Egypt, and was affiliated with the Maccabi World Union Jewish sports movement. It had branches in Cairo, Egypt, including a downtown branch and a branch in the Al-Daher district, and Alexandria, Egypt. In addition to its football teams, the club had a basketball program that reached its peak in the 1940s and 1950s.

After the 1948 Arab–Israeli war, in which Egypt took part, Egyptian authorities restricted Jewish communal institutions. Maccabi clubs in Cairo and Alexandria were generally barred from reopening—except for the clubs' men's basketball teams. They continued competing, in part because of spectator interest and in part because of revenue generated by them for the Egyptian Basketball Federation.

During the 1940s and 1950s, players from the Harari family—including Moris, Leon, Zuzi, David, and Emile Harari—played for Maccabi Cairo. Zaki Harari (known as Zuzi Harari), as team captain and playmaker, and other club players represented the Egypt national basketball team, helping it finish third at EuroBasket 1947 in Prague. Egypt's scoring was led by Harari and his Maccabi Cairo teammate Guido Asher.> Al-Ahram reported that observers in Prague regarded Harari as the most skilled floor leader at the tournament. The French sports newspaper L'Équipe selected Zaki Harari as one of the ten best players of EuroBasket 1947. Le Roster called him "the undisputed leader of the Egyptian team." Harrari also won a gold medal with Team Egypt at the inaugural 1951 Mediterranean Games, and competed with the team representing Egypt at the 1952 Summer Olympics in Helsinki.

Several other Maccabi Cairo players also represented the Egyptian national team during this period, and following the 1956 exodus, Egyptian officials persuaded some former Jewish national team players to return temporarily for international competition.

Sources differ on the club's final championship outcome in 1956. One account reports that Maccabi Cairo won the Egyptian championship in 1956 by defeating the Egyptian Army team 59–57. At the same time, a sports history study notes that the men's team won the Egyptian championship in 1951 and the Cairo championship in 1953 against the army team, and finished as runner-up in the republic championship final in its final season in 1956.

== Decline and legacy ==
Rising political hostility toward Israel, arrests and persecutions affecting Egyptian Jews, and the Suez Crisis of 1956 led to the end of Maccabi Cairo and the departure of much of Egypt's Jewish community. Former Maccabi Cairo players who emigrated to Israel helped establish Maccabi Ashdod B.C. in Israel in 1961.

== See also ==
- Albert Hemmo, played for Maccabi Cairo, before moving to Israel where he had a long professional playing and coaching career, in which he was the Israeli Premier League Top Scorer
