= Georgios Dedas =

Greek professional basketball player

Georgios Dedas Γιώργος Δέδας
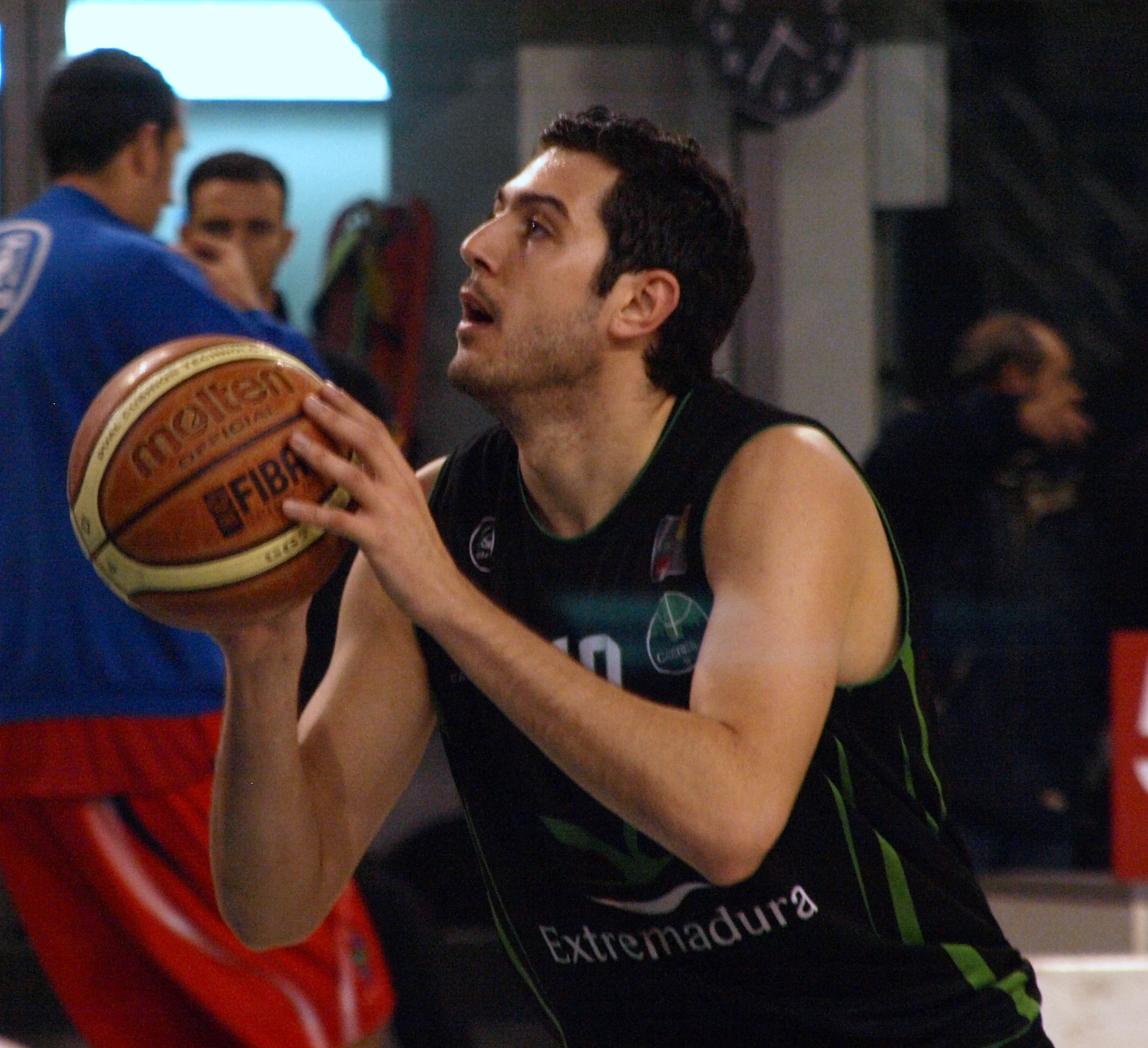
- Dedas with Cáceres, in 2010

PAOK Thessaloniki
- Title: Assistant coach
- League: Greek Basket League

Personal information
- Born: January 2, 1980 (age 46) Komotini, Greece
- Listed height: 6 ft 6.75 in (2.00 m)
- Listed weight: 220 lb (100 kg)

Career information
- Playing career: 1999–2016
- Position: Shooting guard / small forward
- Coaching career: 2016–present

Career history

Playing
- 1999–2003: MENT
- 2003–2006: Iraklis
- 2006–2007: Breogan Lugo
- 2007–2009: Beirasar Rosalia
- 2009–2010: Caceres 2016
- 2010–2011: PAOK Thessaloniki
- 2011–2012: Rethymno
- 2012–2016: PAOK Thessaloniki

Coaching
- 2016–2017: AEK Athens (assistant)
- 2017–2018: Aries Trikala (assistant)
- 2018–2020: Olympiacos (assistant)
- 2020: Avtodor Saratov (assistant)
- 2020–2025: Rytas Vilnius (assistant)
- 2025–2026: Filou Oostende
- 2026–present: PAOK Thessaloniki (assistant)

Career highlights
- As player: Greek All-Star Game 3 Point Shootout Champion (2013); As assistant coach: Lithuanian League champion (2022, 2024)
Medals
Men's basketball
Representing Greece
Mediterranean Games
Silver medal – second place	2005 Almería	Under-26

Georgios Dedas (alternate spellings: Giorgos, Yiorgos) (Greek: Γιώργος Δέδας; born January 2, 1980) is a Greek former professional basketball player and professional basketball coach. He is currently an assistant coach for PAOK of the Greek Basketball League (GBL) and the EuroCup. During his playing career, at a height of 2.00 m (6'6 3/4") tall and a weight of 100 kg (220 lbs.), he played at the shooting guard and small forward positions.

== Professional career ==
After playing basketball as a youth in Kilkis, with the youth teams of Aetos Kilkis, Dedas began his professional career in 1999, with MENT Thessaloniki. In 2003, he moved to Iraklis Thessaloniki. In 2006, he joined Breogan Lugo. He then moved to Beirasar Rosalia in 2007. He then joined Caceres 2016 in 2009.

In 2010, he moved to PAOK Thessaloniki. He joined Rethymno in 2011, and returned to PAOK in 2012. He extended his contract with PAOK in 2014. He retired from playing professional basketball in 2016.

== National team career ==
Dedas won the silver medal at the 2005 Mediterranean Games, while playing with Greece's under-26 national selection.

== Coaching career ==
Dedas started his professional basketball coaching career as an assistant coach of AEK Athens in 2016. In June 2022, Dedas won the Lithuanian League championship as an assistant coach of Rytas Vilnius.

On June 27, 2025, Dedas was named as the head coach of Filou Oostende of the BNXT League. He was sacked on February 27, 2026.

In July 2026, Dedas joined PAOK as a member of Andrea Trinchieri's coaching staff.

== Personal life ==
Dedas' younger brother, Stefanos, is also a professional basketball head coach. He has coached Gaziantep, of the Turkish Super League, among other clubs.

== Awards and accomplishments ==
- 2005 Mediterranean Games: Silver
- 2013 Greek All-Star Game: 3 Point Shootout Contest Champion
