= Miloš Mirković =

Bosnian basketball player

Personal information
- Born: 17 July 1983 (age 43) Tuzla, SR Bosnia and Herzegovina, Yugoslavia
- Listed height: 2.07 m (6 ft 9 in)
- Listed weight: 103 kg (227 lb)

Career information
- NBA draft: 2005: undrafted
- Playing career: 2000–2009, 2015–2016
- Position: Power forward / center
- Number: 9, 12

Career history
- 2000–2003: Krka
- 2003–2004: Crvena zvezda
- 2005: Elektra Šoštanj
- 2005–2006: Ergonom
- 2006: Debreceni
- 2006–2007: ČEZ Nymburk
- 2007–2009: Igokea
- 2009: Air Avellino
- 2015–2016: Mladost Mrkonjić Grad

Miloš Mirković (born 17 July 1983) is a Bosnian former professional basketball player.

== Professional career ==
A power forward and center, Mirković played for Krka, Crvena zvezda, Elektra Šoštanj, Ergonom, Air Avellino, Debreceni, ČEZ Nymburk, and Igokea. He retired as a player in 2009 at age 26 due to injuries.

== National team career ==
Mirković was a member of the Bosnia and Herzegovina national team at the 2005 Mediterranean Games in Almería, Spain.

== Career achievements ==
- Czech National League champion: 2 (with ČEZ Nymburk: 2006–07)
- Serbia and Montenegro Cup winner: 1 (with Crvena zvezda: 2003–04)
- Czech Republic Cup winner: 1 (with ČEZ Nymburk: 2006–07)
