= Egypt men's national basketball team =

Egypt
- FIBA ranking: 42 ▲1 (1 September 2026)
- Joined FIBA: 1934; 92 years ago
- FIBA zone: FIBA Africa
- National federation: EBF
- Coach: Augustí Julbe
- Nickname: The Pharaohs

Olympic Games
- Appearances: 7

FIBA World Cup
- Appearances: 7

AfroBasket
- Appearances: 25
- Medals: (gold) Gold: (1962, 1964, 1970, 1975, 1983); (silver) Silver: (1972, 1981, 1987, 1989, 1993, 2013); (bronze) Bronze: (1978, 1985, 1992, 1999, 2001, 2003)

EuroBasket
- Appearances: 4
- Medals: (gold) Gold: (1949); (bronze) Bronze: (1947)
Home	Away

The Egypt national basketball team represents Egypt in international basketball competitions. The team is directed by the Egyptian Basketball Federation.

The team's most celebrated achievements include a victory at EuroBasket 1949, becoming the only non-European nation to win the competition, and a 5th-place finish at the 1950 FIBA World Championship, as well as its 9th-place finish at the 1952 Summer Olympics, which as of 2026 are still the best results for an African nation at either tournament. At the FIBA Africa Championship, Egypt holds a record number of 17 medals (alongside Angola). Egypt joined the International Federation of Basketball (FIBA) in 1934 and has Africa's longest basketball tradition.

== History ==
=== EuroBasket 1937 ===
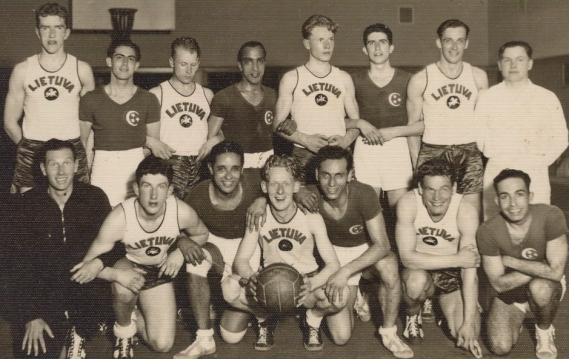
Egyptians posing with EuroBasket 1937 champions Lithuanians.

The Egyptians finished last at the second European basketball championship, the EuroBasket 1937 held by FIBA Europe continental federation. They had lost their first two preliminary round games against Estonia (44–15) and Lithuania (21–7) before withdrawing from the tournament. Their remaining matches were lost by default, including the final preliminary match, the classification semi-final, and the 7th/8th playoff.

=== EuroBasket 1947 ===
Egypt was much more successful in their next appearance, the EuroBasket 1947. They won all three of their preliminary group matches and their first semi-final group game. Their only loss of the tournament came to eventual gold medallist Soviet Union in the second semi-final group game, before Egypt won their third. Their 2–1 record in the semi-final group placed them second and set up a bronze medal match against Belgium, whom Egypt had defeated in the preliminary round. Egypt won again in a close 50–48 match, winning their first European medal.

Captained by 21-year-old guard and playmaker Zaki Harari, Egypt's scoring was led by Harari and his Maccabi Cairo teammate Guido Asher. Al-Ahram reported that observers in Prague regarded Harari as the most skilled floor leader at the tournament. The French sports newspaper L'Équipe selected Zaki Harari as one of the ten best players of EuroBasket 1947. Le Roster called him "the undisputed leader of the Egyptian team."

=== EuroBasket 1949 ===
The following championship was both hosted and won by Egypt. Zaki Harrari did not play, as King Farouk of Egypt vetoed his participation and that of fellow Jewish player Eliahu Amiel just hours before the opening ceremony of EuroBasket 1949 in Cairo, unless they converted to Islam, and both of them refused to convert

It was the smallest tournament in EuroBasket history. It had only seven teams, only four of them actually from Europe, and none of which had placed better than third previously (France and Egypt had both done so). Egypt and France, both undefeated, met in the final game, which Egypt won.

=== 1951 Mediterranean Games ===
The Egyptian national basketball team went undefeated and won a gold medal at the inaugural 1951 Mediterranean Games in Alexandria.

=== 1952 Olympics ===
The team competed at the 1952 Summer Olympics in Helsinki. Egypt finished tied for ninth place with a 3–3 overall record.

=== EuroBasket 1953 ===
In Moscow, the Egyptian team once again competed. The EuroBasket 1953 saw the Egypt squad win their preliminary group easily, scoring more points in the round than anyone save the Soviet Union and Bulgaria, the latter of which had had one more game than Egypt.

The final round was less positive, however. Egypt's offense collapsed, suffering heavy defeats to the Soviet Union (66–27), Hungary (89–50), and Czechoslovakia (87–33). They defeated only Italy on their way to a 1–6 record. Their six losses included a forfeit to Israel, whom Egypt refused to play, which resulted in Egypt receiving zero standings points for the game and finishing behind Italy in the final standings despite their head-to-head win. The squad took 8th place of the 8 teams in the final round and 17 overall, in what proved to be Egypt's final EuroBasket appearance..

=== Later years ===
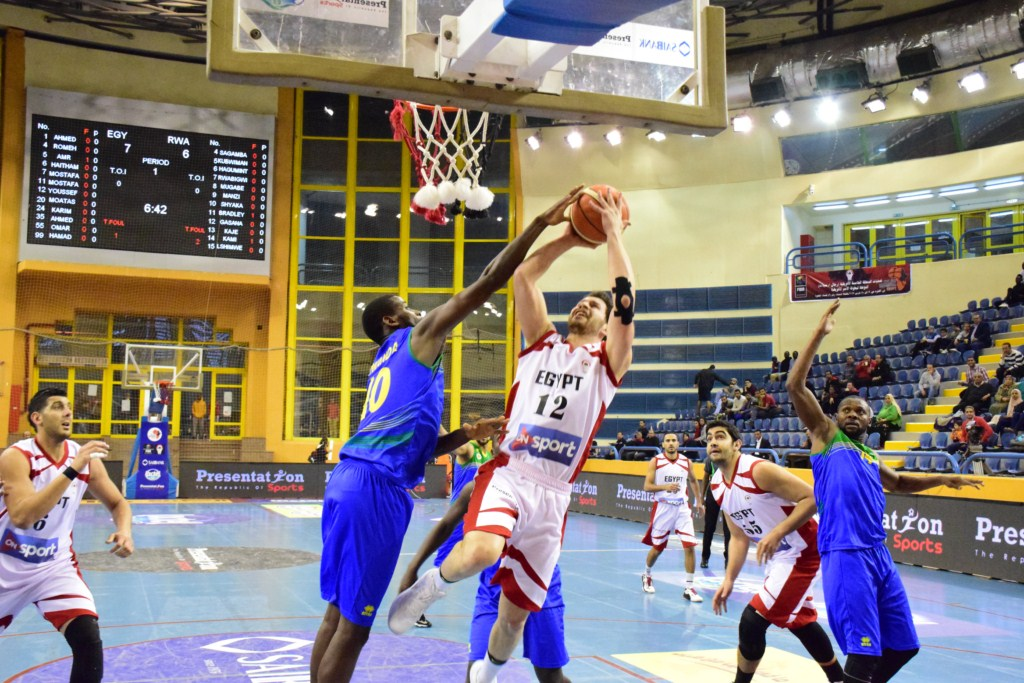
Egypt against Rwanda

In much later years Mohammed Sayed-Soliman Known as Salaawa was the 1984 Olympic Games top-points-per-game-scorer, as Egypt was 0-7 and finished last in the Games.

In the aftermath of the Egyptian Revolution of 2011, several of Egypt's elite players did not compete at the 2011 FIBA Africa Championship. Most notably, Omar Orabi and the then-American Omar Samhan.

== Performance table ==
=== Olympic Games ===
Egypt withdrew from the 1972 tournament following the events of the Munich massacre. At the 1976 Olympics, Egypt withdrew after one game following the boycott of several African countries against New Zealand.

Olympic Games
Year	Round	Position	GP	W	L
(Nazi Germany) 1936	Consolation round	15th–18th	3	0	3
(United Kingdom) 1948	Classification playoffs	19th	7	2	5
(Finland) 1952	Classification playoffs	9th–16th	6	3	3
(Australia) 1956	did not qualify				
(Italy) 1960	did not qualify				
(Japan) 1964	did not qualify				
(Mexico) 1968	did not qualify				
(West Germany) 1972	Classification round	16th	9	0	9
(Canada) 1976	Preliminary round	12th	7	0	7
(Soviet Union) 1980	did not qualify				
(United States) 1984	Preliminary round	12th	7	0	7
(South Korea) 1988	Preliminary round	12th	7	0	7
(Spain) 1992	did not qualify				
(United States) 1996	did not qualify				
(Australia) 2000	did not qualify				
(Greece) 2004	did not qualify				
(China) 2008	did not qualify				
(United Kingdom) 2012	did not qualify				
(Brazil) 2016	did not qualify				
(Japan) 2020	did not qualify				
(France) 2024	did not qualify				
Total	7/21		46	5	41

=== FIBA World Cup ===
World Cup						Qualification		
Year	Round	Position	GP	W	L	GP	W	L
(Argentina) 1950	Final round	5th	7	4	3	AfroBasket served as qualification		
(Brazil) 1954	Did not qualify					AfroBasket served as qualification		
(Chile) 1959	Classification round	11th	6	1	5	AfroBasket served as qualification		
(Brazil) 1963	Did not qualify					AfroBasket served as qualification		
(Uruguay) 1967	Did not qualify					AfroBasket served as qualification		
(Socialist Federal Republic of Yugoslavia) 1970	Classification round	13th	8	0	8	AfroBasket served as qualification		
(Puerto Rico) 1974	Did not qualify					AfroBasket served as qualification		
(Philippines) 1978	Did not qualify					AfroBasket served as qualification		
(Colombia) 1982	Did not qualify					AfroBasket served as qualification		
(Spain) 1986	Did not qualify					AfroBasket served as qualification		
(Argentina) 1990	Classification round	16th	8	0	8	AfroBasket served as qualification		
(Canada) 1994	Classification round	14th	8	1	7	AfroBasket served as qualification		
(Greece) 1998	Did not qualify					AfroBasket served as qualification		
(United States) 2002	Did not qualify					AfroBasket served as qualification		
(Japan) 2006	Did not qualify					AfroBasket served as qualification		
(Turkey) 2010	Did not qualify					AfroBasket served as qualification		
(Spain) 2014	Preliminary round	24th	5	0	5	AfroBasket served as qualification		
(China) 2019	Did not qualify					12	7	5
(Philippines) (Japan) (Indonesia) 2023	Classification round	20th	5	2	3	12	8	4
(Qatar) 2027	To be determined					To be determined		
(France) 2031	To be determined					To be determined		
Total	7/20		47	8	39	24	15	9

=== EuroBasket ===
EuroBasket
Year	Position	Pld	W	L
(Latvia) 1937	8th	5	0	5
(Czechoslovakia) 1947	3rd place, bronze medalist(s)	6	5	1
(Egypt) 1949	1st place, gold medalist(s)	6	6	0
(Soviet Union) 1953	8th	10	4	6
Total		27	15	12

=== FIBA Africa Championship ===
Egypt has won a record 17 medals at the AfroBasket (formerly the African Championship) and is tied for second for most titles (5), trailing Angola. Egypt hosted the tournament a record six times, winning a medal in each of those tournaments including four gold medals.
Champions Runners-up Third place Fourth place

AfroBasket						Qualification record			
Year	Round	Position	GP	W	L	GP	W	L	–
(United Arab Republic) 1962	Champions	1st	4	4	0				
(Morocco) 1964	Champions	1st	5	5	0				
(Tunisia) 1965	did not enter								
(Morocco) 1968	did not enter								
(Egypt) 1970	Champions	1st	5	5	0				
(Senegal) 1972	Runners-up	2nd	6	5	1				
(Central African Republic) 1974	did not enter								
(Egypt) 1975	Champions	1st	5	5	0				
(Senegal) 1978	Third place	3rd	6	5	1				
(Morocco) 1980	did not enter								
(Somalia) 1981	Runners-up	2nd	7	5	2				
(Egypt) 1983	Champions	1st	6	6	0				
(Ivory Coast) 1985	Third place	3rd	7	5	2				
(Tunisia) 1987	Runners-up	2nd	6	4	2				
(Angola) 1989	Runners-up	2nd	7	5	2				
(Egypt) 1992	Third place	3rd	6	5	1				
(Kenya) 1993	Runners-up	2nd	6	5	1				
(Algeria) 1995	did not enter								
(Senegal) 1997	Fourth place	4th	5	2	3				
(Angola) 1999	Third place	3rd	7	6	1				
(Morocco) 2001	Third place	3rd	7	5	2				
(Egypt) 2003	Third place	3rd	7	5	2				
(Algeria) 2005	did not enter								
(Angola) 2007	Fourth place	4th	6	3	3				
(Libya) 2009	Eightfinal round	10th	8	2	6	4	3	1	2009
(Madagascar) 2011	Round of 16	11th	5	2	3	Wild card			
(Ivory Coast) 2013	Runners-up	2nd	7	3	4	3	3	0	2013
(Tunisia) 2015	Quarter-finals	5th	7	6	1	4	4	0	2015
(Tunisia) (Senegal) 2017	Quarter-finals	8th	4	2	2	5	5	0	2017
(Rwanda) 2021	Eightfinals	11th	4	1	3	5	5	0	2021
(Angola) 2025	Quarter-finals	6th	4	3	1	6	3	3	2025
Total	25/31		147	104	43	27	23	4	–

=== AfroCan ===
- 2019 – 9th

=== African Games ===
- 1965 – (gold)
- 1973 – (bronze)
- 1991 – (gold)
- 1995 – (gold)
- 1999 – (gold)
- 2007 – (silver)
- 2011 – 5th
- 2015 – (silver)
- 2019 – (silver)

=== Pan Arab Games ===
- 1953 – (gold)
- 1961 – (gold)
- 1965 – (gold)
- 1999 – (gold)
- 2004 – (gold)
- 2007 – (gold)
- 2011 – (bronze)

=== Mediterranean Games ===
- 1951 Alexandria – (gold)
- 1959 Beirut – (bronze)
- 1979 Split – (bronze)
- 2005 Almería – 5th
- 2013 Mersin – 6th
- 2022 Oran – 9th

== Team ==
=== Current roster ===
Team for the AfroBasket 2025.

Egypt men's national basketball team – 2023 FIBA Basketball World Cup roster roster
Players
Coaches

Pos.	No.	Name	Age – Date of birth	Height	Club	Ctr.
F	1	Ibrahim Zahran	21 – 13 March 2004	1.94 m (6 ft 4 in)	Al Ahly	(Egypt)
G	2	Adam Moussa	23 – 14 July 2002	1.90 m (6 ft 3 in)	Tarleton State Texans	(United States)
G	4	Ehab Amin	30 – 1 August 1995	1.85 m (6 ft 1 in)	Al Ahly	(Egypt)
PF	5	Amr Gendy (C)	34 – 14 June 1991	1.93 m (6 ft 4 in)	Al Ahly	(Egypt)
SG	6	Yassin Nasr (C)	21 – 12 November 2003	1.87 m (6 ft 2 in)	Sporting	(Egypt)
SF	9	Mohamed Mohamed (C)	29 – 6 July 1996	1.79 m (5 ft 10 in)	Al Ittihad	(Egypt)
PF	10	Anas Mahmoud	30 – 9 May 1995	2.14 m (7 ft 0 in)	Al Ittihad	(Egypt)
SG	12	Youssef Aboushousha	32 – 9 June 1993	1.93 m (6 ft 4 in)	Al Ittihad	(Egypt)
C	15	Ahmed Khalaf	26 – 24 February 1999	2.06 m (6 ft 9 in)	Al Ittihad	(Egypt)
C	20	Patrick Gardner	26 – 16 June 1999	2.11 m (6 ft 11 in)	Petro de Luanda	(Angola)
PF	28	Khaled Abdelgawad	26 – 15 February 1999	2.04 m (6 ft 8 in)	Zamalek	(Egypt)
C	55	Omar Oraby	33 – 8 September 1991	2.18 m (7 ft 2 in)	Al Ahly	(Egypt)

Head coach

- (Canada) Mohamed El Kardani

Assistant coach(es)

- (Egypt) Ramy Abdalla
- (Egypt) Mohamed Selim

Legend

- (C) Team captain
- Club – describes last
  club before the tournament
- Age – describes age
  on 12 August 2025

=== Notable players ===
Other current notable players from Egypt:

Egypt roster
Players
Coaches

Pos.	No.	Name	Age – Date of birth	Height	Club	Ctr.
F		Abdel Nader	28 – 25 September 1993	1.98 m (6 ft 6 in)	Phoenix Suns	(United States)
F		Assem Marei	29 – 16 June 1992	2.06 m (6 ft 9 in)	LG Sakers	(South Korea)
F		Ismael Massoud	21 – 6 May 2000	2.06 m (6 ft 9 in)	Kansas State Wildcats	(United States)
F		Marwan Sarhan	29 – 2 May 1992	2.03 m (6 ft 8 in)	Al Ahly	(Egypt)

Legend

- Club – describes current club
- Age – describes age on 1 January 2022

=== Head coach history ===
- (Egypt) Fouad Abdel Meguid El-Kheir – 1983
- (Egypt) Adel Sabri – 1985–1993
- (United States) Robert Taylor – 1993–1994
- (Egypt) Adel Sabri – 1995–1997
- (Italy) Mario Blasone – 1998–1999
- (Egypt) Adel Sabri – 2000–2003
- (Egypt) Ashraf Tawfik – 2004–2006
- (Egypt) Adel Abdel Fattah – 2006–2007
- (Egypt) Sami Al Sharoni – 2008
- (Serbia) Željko Zečević – 2009
- (Serbia) Miodrag Perišić – 2011
- (Egypt) Amr Aboul Kheir – 2012–2014
- (Egypt) Ahmed Marei – 2015–2016
- (Spain) Juan Antonio Orenga – 2016–2017
- (Egypt) Amr Aboul Kheir – 2017–2018
- (Egypt) Essam Abdel Hamid – 2019
- (Egypt) Ahmed Marei – 2019–2021
- (Canada) Roy Rana – 2022–2023
- (Germany) Henrik Rödl – 2024
- (Egypt) Mohamed Elkerdany – 2025–present

=== Past rosters ===
1947 EuroBasket: finished 3rd among 14 teams

Albert Tadros, Gabriel "Gaby" Catafago, Youssef Abbas, Fouad Abdelmeguid el-Kheir, Abdelrahman Ismail, Hussein Montasser, Wahid Saleh, Zaki Harari, Hassan Moawad, Zaki Yehia, Guido Acher, Maurice Calife

EuroBasket 1949: finished 1st among 7 teams

Gabriel "Gaby" Catafago, Albert Tadros, Youssef Abouaouf, Fouad Abdelmeguid el-Kheir, Abdelrahman Ismail, Hussein Montasser, Nessim Salah el-Dine, Wahid Saleh, Medhat Youssef, Mohammed Soliman, Youssef Abbas, Mohammed Ali el-Rashidi (Coach: Carmine "Nello" Paratore), Team captain: Albert Tadros

Team for the 2014 FIBA Basketball World Cup.

Egypt men's national basketball team roster
Players
Coaches

Pos.	No.	Name	Age – Date of birth	Height	Club
F	4	Seif Samir	21 – 5 June 1993	2.03 m (6 ft 8 in)	Al Ahly	(Egypt)
G	5	Amr Gendy	23 – 14 June 1991	1.93 m (6 ft 4 in)	Gezira	(Egypt)
C	6	Haytham Kamal	26 – 17 November 1987	2.07 m (6 ft 9 in)	Al Ittihad	(Egypt)
G	7	Wael Badr (C)	35 – 1 December 1978	1.92 m (6 ft 4 in)	Sporting	(Egypt)
F	8	Moamen Abouelanin	28 – 25 June 1986	1.94 m (6 ft 4 in)	Al Ittihad	(Egypt)
G	9	Ibrahim El-Gammal	26 – 23 March 1988	1.91 m (6 ft 3 in)	Al Ahly	(Egypt)
G	10	Mouhanad El-Sabagh	26 – 23 April 1988	1.86 m (6 ft 1 in)	Al Ittihad	(Egypt)
G	11	Sherif Genedy	35 – 3 April 1979	1.88 m (6 ft 2 in)	Gezira	(Egypt)
F	12	Youssef Shousha	21 – 9 June 1993	1.90 m (6 ft 3 in)	Sporting	(Egypt)
G	13	Moustafa Elmekawi	19 – 22 October 1994	2.04 m (6 ft 8 in)	Zamalek	(Egypt)
F	14	Rami Ibrahim	26 – 6 February 1988	2.04 m (6 ft 8 in)	Al Ittihad	(Egypt)
F	15	Ashraf Rabie	31 – 16 January 1983	2.05 m (6 ft 9 in)	Al Ittihad	(Egypt)

Head coach

- (Egypt) Amr Aboul Kheir

Assistant coach(es)

- (Egypt) Sabry Saleh

Legend

- Club – describes last
  club before the tournament
- Age – describes age
  on 30 August 2014

Team for the 2015 FIBA Africa Championship.

Egypt men's national basketball team roster
Players
Coaches

Pos.	No.	Name	Age – Date of birth	Height	Club
C	1	Haytham Kamal	27 – 17 November 1987	2.07 m (6 ft 9 in)	Al Ittihad	(Egypt)
G	4	Ehab Amin	20 – 1 August 1995	1.90 m (6 ft 3 in)	Texas A&M Corpus Christi	(United States)
G	5	Amr Gendy	24 – 14 June 1991	1.93 m (6 ft 4 in)	Gezira	(Egypt)
G	6	Ramy Gunady (C)	33 – 20 December 1981	1.85 m (6 ft 1 in)	Zamalek	(Egypt)
G	9	Ibrahim El-Gammal	27 – 23 March 1988	1.91 m (6 ft 3 in)	Al Ahly	(Egypt)
G	10	Ahmed Tawfik	27 – 2 November 1987	1.99 m (6 ft 6 in)	Sporting	(Egypt)
C	11	Aly Ahmed	23 – 15 March 1992	2.06 m (6 ft 9 in)	CSU Bakersfield University	(United States)
F	12	Youssef Shousha	22 – 9 June 1993	1.90 m (6 ft 3 in)	Sporting	(Egypt)
F	14	Rami Ibrahim	27 – 6 February 1988	2.04 m (6 ft 8 in)	Al Ittihad	(Egypt)
G	30	Ahmed Hesham	22 – 14 October 1992	1.94 m (6 ft 4 in)	Sporting	(Egypt)
F	50	Assem Marei	23 – 16 June 1992	2.06 m (6 ft 9 in)	Minnesota State University	(United States)
F	55	Omar Oraby	23 – 8 September 1991	2.18 m (7 ft 2 in)	Gezira	(Egypt)

Head coach

- (Egypt) Ahmed Marei

Assistant coach(es)

- (Egypt) Mohamed Gaber

Legend

- Club – describes last
  club before the tournament
- Age – describes age
  on 19 August 2015

== See also ==
- Egypt men's national under-19 basketball team
- Egypt men's national under-17 basketball team
- Egypt women's national basketball team
- Egypt women's national under-19 basketball team
- Egypt women's national under-17 basketball team
- Egypt men's national 3x3 team
- Egypt women's national 3x3 team
- Egypt women's national under-18 3x3 team
- Egypt men's national under-18 3x3 team
