= Zaki Harari =

Egyptian basketball player (1926–1979)

Personal information
- Native name: زكي سليم ابراهيم حريري
- Full name: Zaki Selim Ibrahim Harari
- Other names: Zuzi Harari, Zouzi Harari, and Zaki Selman
- Nationality: Egyptian
- Born: 7 February 1926 Cairo, Egypt
- Died: 5 November 1979 (aged 53)

Sport
- Sport: Basketball
- Club: Maccabi Cairo
Medal record
Men's basketball
Representing Egypt
EuroBasket
Bronze medal – third place	1947 Prague
Mediterranean Games
Gold medal – first place	1951 Egypt

Zaki Harari (Arabic: زكي حريري; 7 February 1926 – 5 November 1979), also known as Zuzi Harari, Zouzi Harari, and later as Zaki Selim, was a Jewish Egyptian Olympic basketball player.

== Basketball career ==
=== Maccabi Cairo career ===
Harari competed as a playmaker with his brothers Maurice (Moris), Leon, David, and Emile for the Jewish Egyptian basketball club Maccabi Cairo.

=== Egypt national team career ===
At age 21 and the team's playmaker while playing guard, Harari captained the Egyptian national team to a bronze medal at EuroBasket 1947 in Prague, helping it finish third. The French sports newspaper L'Équipe selected him as one of the ten best players of the tournament. Le Roster called him "the undisputed leader of the Egyptian team." Al-Ahram reported that observers in Prague regarded Harari as the most skilled floor leader at the tournament.

Despite his status on the national team, King Farouk of Egypt vetoed Harari's participation and that of fellow Jewish player Eliahu Amiel just hours before the opening ceremony of EuroBasket 1949 in Cairo, unless they converted to Islam. Both of them refused to convert.

Harari returned to the Egyptian national basketball team to win a gold medal at the inaugural 1951 Mediterranean Games in Alexandria.

Registered under the name Zaki Selim, he represented Egypt in basketball at the 1952 Summer Olympics in Helsinki. He played in six games, and Egypt finished tied for ninth place with a 3-3 record.

== Later life ==
Following the Suez Crisis in 1956 and the subsequent persecution and exodus of Egypt's Jewish community, Maccabi Cairo disbanded and Harari emigrated to Israel. With other former Maccabi Cairo players who relocated to the country, he contributed to the early development of basketball in Israel.
