= Moamen Abouelanin =

Egyptian basketball player

Personal information
- Born: June 25, 1986 (age 40)
- Listed height: 1.97 m (6 ft 6 in)

Career information
- NBA draft: 2008: undrafted
- Position: Forward

Career history
- 2006–2016: Al Ittihad
- 2016–2019: Al Ahly

Moamen Abouelanin (born 25 June 1986) is a former Egyptian basketball player. He played in Egypt for the clubs, Al Ittihad Alexandria and Al Ahly. Abouelanin also played with the Egyptian national team and participated at the 2014 FIBA Basketball World Cup.
