= Youssef Aboushousha =

Egyptian basketball player

No. 12 – Al Ittihad Alexandria
- Position: Shooting guard
- League: Egyptian Basketball Super League

Personal information
- Born: 9 June 1993 (age 32); Alexandria, Egypt
- Listed height: 1.93 m (6 ft 4 in)
- Listed weight: 87 kg (192 lb)

Career information
- NBA draft: 2015: undrafted

Career history
- Sporting Alexandria
- 2018–present: Al Ittihad Alexandria

Career highlights
- Egypt Cup winner (2024)

Youssef Wael Aboushousha (born 9 June 1993), also known as Youssef Shousha, is an Egyptian basketball player for Al Ittihad Alexandria. He played for the Egyptian national team, where he participated at the 2014 FIBA Basketball World Cup.

Aboushousha won the 2024 Egyptian Basketball Cup with Ittihad.
