= Amr Aboul Kheir =

Egyptian basketball coach

Amr Aboul Kheir is an Egyptian basketball coach for the Egyptian national team, which participated at the 2014 FIBA Basketball World Cup.
