= Sherif Genedy =

Egyptian basketball player

Personal information
- Born: April 3, 1979 (age 47)
- Listed height: 6 ft 2 in (1.88 m)

Career information
- Playing career: 2004–2014
- Position: Guard

Career history
- 2004–2014: Gezira

Sherif Genedy (born April 3, 1979) is an Egyptian basketball player for Gezira and the Egyptian national team, where he participated at the 2014 FIBA Basketball World Cup.
