= 2008 FIBA Africa Clubs Champions Cup squads =

This article displays the rosters for the participating teams at the 2006 FIBA Africa Club Championship.

== Al Shabab ==
Al Shabab – 2008 FIBA Africa Clubs Champions Cup – 6th place roster
Players							Coaches
Pos	#	Nat	Name	Height	Weight	Age	Head Coach
	4	(Libya)	Mohamed Elhaj			25 July 1985 (aged 23)
	5	(Libya)	Said Misurati			1 January 1984 (aged 24)
	6	(Libya)	Mohamed Mrsal			1 January 1978 (aged 30)	Assistant coach(es)
	7	(Libya)	Nadir Elmdawekh			1 May 1984 (aged 24)
	8	(Libya)	Mohamed Dugi			6 December 1983 (aged 25)
	9	(Libya)	Eslam El Karbal			21 May 1983 (aged 25)
PG	10	(Algeria)	Abdelhalim Kaouane	1.80 m (5 ft 11 in)		29 November 1981 (aged 27)
	11	(United States)	James Maye			29 January 1981 (aged 27)
	12	(Libya)	Alamien Yagoub			1 March 1981 (aged 27)
	13	(Libya)	Sohaib Gherfal			29 September 1985 (aged 23)
	14	(Libya)	Wajdi Dawo			29 October 1988 (aged 20)
	15	(Libya)	Abdalla Yeza			9 July 1984 (aged 24)

== APR ==
APR – 2008 FIBA Africa Clubs Champions Cup – 8th place roster
Players							Coaches
Pos	#	Nat	Name	Height	Weight	Age	Head Coach
	4	(Kenya)	Daniel Okwirry			17 March 1981 (aged 27)
	5	(Democratic Republic of the Congo)	Ntumba Buzangu			5 November 1982 (aged 26)
	6	(Rwanda)	Aboubakar Barame			26 April 1984 (aged 24)	Assistant coach(es)
	7	(Burundi)	Blaise Nikobahoze			12 April 1988 (aged 20)
	8	(Rwanda)	Aimé Nkusi			12 December 1983 (aged 25)
	9	(Burundi)	Prince Ntwari			30 April 1984 (aged 24)
	10	(Uganda)	Arthur Karuletwa			22 May 1975 (aged 33)
	11	(Burundi)	José Munyangaju			15 March 1980 (aged 28)
	12	(Democratic Republic of the Congo)	Serge Kabange			27 April 1983 (aged 25)
	13	(Rwanda)	Abiddanny Bisanukuri			16 June 1980 (aged 28)
	14	(Democratic Republic of the Congo)	Kami Kabangu			2 July 1984 (aged 24)
	15	(Democratic Republic of the Congo)	Bienvenu Ngandu			28 August 1985 (aged 23)

== AS Swallows ==
AS Swallows – 2008 FIBA Africa Clubs Champions Cup – 9th place roster
Players							Coaches
Pos	#	Nat	Name	Height	Weight	Age	Head Coach
	4	(Togo)	Comlan Pinheiro			14 April 1981 (aged 27)
	5	(Togo)	Kokou Akakpo			17 August 1983 (aged 25)
	6	(Togo)	Assad Kadi			30 May 1986 (aged 22)	Assistant coach(es)
	7	(Togo)	Yaovi de Souza			6 October 1977 (aged 31)
	8	(Ivory Coast)	Mamadou Savadogo			17 April 1978 (aged 30)
	9	(Togo)	Komi Ayayi			30 October 1986 (aged 22)
	10	(Togo)	Fofana Saibou			11 November 1986 (aged 22)
	11	(Togo)	Sadou Barry			5 April 1981 (aged 27)
	12	(Burkina Faso)	Ali Tapsoba			12 September 1987 (aged 21)
	13	(Togo)	Essé Ajavon			14 April 1981 (aged 27)
	14	(Togo)	Ahmed Bouraïma			15 February 1982 (aged 26)
	15	(Togo)	Mouctar Diaby			31 December 1985 (aged 22)

== ASA ==
ASA – 2008 FIBA Africa Clubs Champions Cup – Bronze medal roster
Players							Coaches
Pos	#	Nat	Name	Height	Weight	Age	Head Coach
	4	(Angola)	Wilson da Mata			17 November 1981 (aged 27)	(Angola) Carlos Dinis
	5	(Angola)	Cristóvão Oliveira			10 October 1982 (aged 26)
	6	(Angola)	Carlos Quibato			20 October 1975 (aged 33)	Assistant coach(es)
	7	(Angola)	Hélder Ortet			2 November 1982 (aged 26)
	8	(Angola)	Filipe Abraão	1.94 m (6 ft 4 1/2 in)	88 kg (194 lb)	31 December 1979 (aged 28)
	9	(Angola)	Edmundo Ventura			4 March 1976 (aged 32)
	10	(Angola)	Wilson de Carvalho			23 September 1979 (aged 29)
	11	(Angola)	José Santos			24 December 1978 (aged 29)
	12	(Angola)	Adolfo Quimbamba	1.97 m (6 ft 5 1/2 in)	104 kg (229 lb)	26 December 1982 (aged 25)
	13	(Angola)	Afonso Rodrigues			3 April 1982 (aged 26)
	14	(Angola)	Francisco Gonçalves			6 August 1975 (aged 33)
	15	(United States)	Leroy Watkins	2.01 m (6 ft 7 in)		30 August 1976 (aged 32)

== BACK ==
BACK – 2008 FIBA Africa Clubs Champions Cup – 11th place roster
Players							Coaches
Pos	#	Nat	Name	Height	Weight	Age	Head Coach
	4	(Guinea)	Yaya Kasse			28 May 1994 (aged 14)
	5	(Guinea)	Mamady Soumaoro			7 October 1983 (aged 23)
	6	(Guinea)	Daouda Gueye			10 October 1976 (aged 30)	Assistant coach(es)
	7	(Guinea)	Djibril Savane			10 November 1982 (aged 26)
	8	(Guinea)	Amadou Camara			24 December 1989 (aged 18)
	9	(Guinea)	Amadou Bah			2 July 1985 (aged 23)
	10	(Guinea)	Amara Keita			1 January 1987 (aged 21)
	11	(Guinea)	Sékou Condé			31 December 1986 (aged 21)
	12	(Guinea)	Mohamed Kaba			3 December 1991 (aged 17)
	13	(Guinea)	Koumandiou Kéita			4 May 1986 (aged 22)
	14	(Guinea)	Bangaly Sangaré			12 October 1988 (aged 20)
	15	(Guinea)	Cheick Condé			20 June 1992 (aged 16)

== Étoile Sportive du Sahel ==
Étoile Sportive du Sahel – 2008 FIBA Africa Clubs Champions Cup – Silver medal roster
Players							Coaches
Pos	#	Nat	Name	Height	Weight	Age	Head Coach
PF	4	(Tunisia)	Moez Mestiri	1.98 m (6 ft 6 in)		6 April 1983 (aged 25)	(Cyprus) Pantelis Gavriel
C	5	(Tunisia)	Salah Mejri	2.16 m (7 ft 1 in)	110 kg (240 lb)	15 June 1986 (aged 22)
C	6	(United States)	Malcom Battles	2.06 m (6 ft 9 in)	113 kg (249 lb)	27 May 1979 (aged 29)	Assistant coach(es)
	7	(Tunisia)	Mohamed Hassen			14 December 1982 (aged 26)	(Egypt) Hattab Nebil
G	8	(Tunisia)	Omar Mouhli	1.90 m (6 ft 3 in)		19 March 1986 (aged 22)
PF	9	(Tunisia)	Ben Romdhane	2.04 m (6 ft 8 1/2 in)	107 kg (236 lb)	27 March 1989 (aged 19)
	10	(Tunisia)	Maher Khenfir			22 February 1970 (aged 38)
	11	(Tunisia)	Issam Douissa			15 May 1980 (aged 28)
PF	12	(Tunisia)	Atef Maoua	2.00 m (6 ft 6 1/2 in)	98 kg (216 lb)	28 January 1981 (aged 27)
G	13	(Tunisia)	Jamarr Hardy	1.91 m (6 ft 3 in)		24 June 1983 (aged 25)
	14	(Tunisia)	Hamdi Braa	2.03 m (6 ft 8 in)	103 kg (227 lb)	7 September 1986 (aged 27)
C	15	(Tunisia)	Maher Bekri	2.05 m (6 ft 8 1/2 in)		2 September 1979 (aged 29)

== Kano Pillars ==
Kano Pillars – 2008 FIBA Africa Clubs Champions Cup – 5th place roster
Players							Coaches
Pos	#	Nat	Name	Height	Weight	Age	Head Coach
	4	(Nigeria)	Haruna Sule			19 June 1990 (aged 18)	[[]]
	5	(Nigeria)	Isiaka Yusuf			31 December 1988 (aged 19)
	6	(Nigeria)	Musa Gwadabe			17 May 1990 (aged 18)	Assistant coach(es)
F	7	(Nigeria)	Abubakar Usman	1.94 m (6 ft 4 1/2 in)		5 July 1986 (aged 22)	(Nigeria) Abdul Maku
	8	(Nigeria)	Mathew Onmonya	1.98 m (6 ft 6 in)		29 November 1986 (aged 22)
	9	(Nigeria)	Abdulrahman Mohammed	1.90 m (6 ft 3 in)		27 June 1977 (aged 31)
F	10	(Nigeria)	Stanley Gumut	2.00 m (6 ft 6 1/2 in)	95 kg (209 lb)	21 February 1986 (aged 22)
	11	(Nigeria)	Kashim Ahmed			5 May 1987 (aged 21)
F	12	(Nigeria)	Baba Mohammed	2.00 m (6 ft 6 1/2 in)		31 October 1992 (aged 16)
	13	(Nigeria)	Ahmed Aliyu			20 December 1976 (aged 32)
	14	(Nigeria)	Kolawole Reuben			14 June 1985 (aged 23)
	15	(Nigeria)	Dennis Ebikoro			30 August 1988 (aged 20)

== Lupopo ==
Lupopo – 2008 FIBA Africa Clubs Champions Cup – 12th place roster
Players							Coaches
Pos	#	Nat	Name	Height	Weight	Age	Head Coach
	4	(Democratic Republic of the Congo)	Nsiama Lelo			22 December 1987 (aged 20)
	6	(Democratic Republic of the Congo)	Ngoy Wa Ngoy			27 July 1990 (aged 18)	Assistant coach(es)
	7	(Democratic Republic of the Congo)	Kapenda Mushima			25 November 1978 (aged 30)
	8	(Democratic Republic of the Congo)	Kambuy Manga			12 December 1988 (aged 20)
	9	(Democratic Republic of the Congo)	Mwema Shandiabana			14 June 1980 (aged 28)
	10	(Democratic Republic of the Congo)	Kabemba Nyempia			20 September 1980 (aged 28)
	12	(Democratic Republic of the Congo)	Kabengele Kabasu			21 April 1986 (aged 22)
	13	(Democratic Republic of the Congo)	Tshibambe Mtambwe			9 August 1984 (aged 24)
	14	(Democratic Republic of the Congo)	Bunduki Bunduki Bin			27 December 1979 (aged 28)
	15	(Democratic Republic of the Congo)	Tshibangu Kaninda			6 September 1977 (aged 31)

== Onatra ==
BC Onatra – 2008 FIBA Africa Clubs Champions Cup – 10th place roster
Players							Coaches
Pos	#	Nat	Name	Height	Weight	Age	Head Coach
	5	(Democratic Republic of the Congo)	Toto Mutombo			19 September 1979 (aged 29)
	6	(Democratic Republic of the Congo)	Guelor Nkatu			28 April 1987 (aged 21)	Assistant coach(es)
	7	(Democratic Republic of the Congo)	Chimwanga Chilumba			6 January 1988 (aged 20)
	8	(Democratic Republic of the Congo)	Tatu Mbowa			6 April 1980 (aged 28)
	9	(Democratic Republic of the Congo)	Kanyinda Tshiabola			6 September 1985 (aged 23)
	10	(Democratic Republic of the Congo)	Docta Lukusa			2 July 1981 (aged 27)
	11	(Democratic Republic of the Congo)	Amisi Saidi			10 October 1987 (aged 21)
	12	(Democratic Republic of the Congo)	Rodrigue Mawelo			20 August 1988 (aged 20)
	13	(Democratic Republic of the Congo)	Mabilama Samuna			12 June 1978 (aged 30)
	14	(Democratic Republic of the Congo)	Isasi Ndelo			18 November 1986 (aged 22)
	15	(Democratic Republic of the Congo)	Gislain Kanda			24 April 1989 (aged 19)

== Primeiro de Agosto ==
Primeiro de Agosto – 2008 FIBA Africa Clubs Champions Cup – Gold medal roster
Players							Coaches
Pos	#	Nat	Name	Height	Weight	Age	Head Coach
G	4	(Angola)	Mayzer Alexandre	1.84 m (6 ft 1/2 in)		29 June 1984 (aged 24)	(Portugal) Luís Magalhães
PG	5	(Angola)	Armando Costa	1.92 m (6 ft 3 1/2 in)	91 kg (201 lb)	3 June 1983 (aged 25)
G	6	(Angola)	Adilson Baza	1.85 m (6 ft 1 in)		25 April 1989 (aged 19)
F	7	(Angola)	Olímpio Cipriano	1.94 m (6 ft 4 1/2 in)	93 kg (205 lb)	9 April 1982 (aged 26)
C	8	(Angola)	Joaquim Gomes	2.00 m (6 ft 6 1/2 in)	100 kg (220 lb)	23 December 1980 (aged 27)
C	9	(Angola)	Felizardo Ambrósio	2.02 m (6 ft 7 1/2 in)	97 kg (214 lb)	25 December 1987 (aged 20)
PF	10	(Angola)	Vladimir Ricardino	2.03 m (6 ft 8 in)	93 kg (205 lb)	4 October 1978 (aged 30)
C	11	(Portugal)	Francisco Jordão	2.00 m (6 ft 6 1/2 in)		22 June 1978 (aged 30)
	12	(Angola)	Simão João			1 January 1989 (aged 19)
SF	13	(Angola)	Carlos Almeida	1.93 m (6 ft 4 in)	91 kg (201 lb)	24 September 1976 (aged 32)
PG	14	(Angola)	Miguel Lutonda	1.86 m (6 ft 1 in)	78 kg (172 lb)	24 December 1971 (aged 36)
PF	15	(Cape Verde) (Netherlands)	Rodrigo Mascarenhas	1.96 m (6 ft 5 in)		24 March 1980 (aged 28)

== Stade Nabeulien ==
Stade Nabeulien – 2008 FIBA Africa Clubs Champions Cup – 4th place roster
Players							Coaches
Pos	#	Nat	Name	Height	Weight	Age	Head Coach
C	4	(Tunisia)	Mohamed Ghyaza	2.06 m (6 ft 9 in)	106 kg (234 lb)	15 November 1986 (aged 22)	[[]]
	5	(Tunisia)	Naïm Mbarek			12 February 1979 (aged 29)
	6	(Tunisia)	Tarak Timouni			26 October 1982 (aged 26)	Assistant coach(es)
	7	(Tunisia)	Anis Hadidane			9 November 1986 (aged 22)
	8	(Tunisia)	Anis Abdallah			31 March 1980 (aged 28)
	9	(Tunisia)	Mohamed Hadidane			27 April 1986 (aged 22)
	10	(Tunisia)	Bechir Hadidane			18 August 1984 (aged 24)
	11	(Tunisia)	Aymen Trabelsi			6 June 1987 (aged 21)
	12	(Tunisia)	Nizar Knioua			8 June 1983 (aged 25)
	13	(Tunisia)	Alioune Seck			15 August 1989 (aged 19)
	14	(Tunisia)	Mohamed Mouine			1 January 1986 (aged 22)
	15	(Democratic Republic of the Congo)	Gege Kizubanata			12 May 1981 (aged 27)

== Union Bank ==
Union Bank – 2008 FIBA Africa Clubs Champions Cup – 7th place roster
Players							Coaches
Pos	#	Nat	Name	Height	Weight	Age	Head Coach
	4	(Nigeria)	Michael Ohiero			20 March 1988 (aged 20)
	5	(Nigeria)	Ahmed Ayodele			18 July 1989 (aged 19)
	6	(Nigeria)	Daniel Daudu			22 October 1989 (aged 19)	Assistant coach(es)
	7	(Nigeria)	Dave Ajumobi			20 November 1988 (aged 20)
	8	(Nigeria)	Abubakar Yusuf			28 August 1988 (aged 20)
	9	(Nigeria)	Azuoma Dike			7 December 1989 (aged 19)
	10	(Cameroon)	Jean Pierre Ebongue			7 October 1985 (aged 23)
	11	(Nigeria)	Moses Ayegba			4 January 1991 (aged 17)
	12	(Nigeria)	Chinedu Okoh			10 March 1985 (aged 23)
	13	(Nigeria)	Duoje Ellison			15 December 1990 (aged 18)
	14	(Nigeria)	Baba Mohammed			31 October 1992 (aged 16)
	15	(Nigeria)	Oludare Borokini			23 July 1985 (aged 23)
