= 2008 FIBA Africa Clubs Champions Cup =

- Season: 2008
- Dates: 12–21 December 2009
- Teams: 12

Regular season
- Season MVP: (Angola) Joaquim Gomes

Finals
- Champions: (Angola) Primeiro de Agosto (4th title)
- Runners-up: (Tunisia) ES Sahel
- Third place: (Angola) ASA
- Fourth place: (Tunisia) Stade Nabeulien

Statistical leaders
| Points | (Libya) Mohamed Mrsal | 17.8 |
| Rebounds | (Libya) Alamien Yagoub | 12.6 |
| Assists | (Libya) Abdelhalim Kaouane | 3.4 |

The 2008 FIBA Africa Basketball Club Championship (23rd edition), was an international basketball tournament held in Sousse and Hammam, Tunisia, from December 12 to 21, 2008. The tournament, organized by FIBA Africa, and hosted by Étoile Sportive du Sahel, was contested by 12 teams split into 2 groups of 6, the first four of which qualifying for the knock-out stage, quarter, semifinals and final.

The tournament was won by Primeiro de Agosto from Angola, thus successfully retaining its title.

== Draw ==
| Group A | Group B |
|---|---|
| (Rwanda) APR (Togo) AS Swallows (Angola) ASA (Tunisia) Étoile Sahel (Nigeria) Kano Pillars (Democratic Republic of the Congo) Lupopo | (Libya) Al Shabab (Guinea) BACK (Democratic Republic of the Congo) BC Onatra (Angola) Primeiro de Agosto (Tunisia) Stade Nabeulien (Nigeria) Union Bank |

== Preliminary round ==
Times given below are in UTC+1.

=== Group A ===
| Qualified for the quarter-finals |

| | Group A | M | W | L | PF | PA | Diff | P |
|---|---|---|---|---|---|---|---|---|
| 1. | (Tunisia) Étoile Sahel | 5 | 5 | 0 | 479 | 301 | +178 | 10 |
| 2. | (Rwanda) APR | 5 | 4 | 1 | 381 | 346 | +35 | 8 |
| 3. | (Angola) ASA | 5 | 4 | 1 | 348 | 322 | +26 | 8 |
| 4. | (Nigeria) Kano Pillars | 5 | 2 | 3 | 304 | 312 | -8 | 4 |
| 5. | (Togo) AS Swallows | 5 | 1 | 4 | 303 | 354 | −51 | 2 |
| 6. | (Democratic Republic of the Congo) Lupopo | 5 | 1 | 4 | 303 | 354 | −51 | 2 |

December 12, 2008
14:30

Report

| Kano Pillars (Nigeria) | 67–42 | (Togo) AS Swallows |
Scoring by quarter: 17–12, 24–8, 10–16, 16–6
| Pts: Usman 12; Rebs: Usman 7 Asts: Usman, Gumut 2 | | Pts: Diaby 13; Rebs: Diaby 14; Asts: Diaby 2 |

December 12, 2008
18:00

Report

| APR (Rwanda) | 55–92 | (Tunisia) Étoile Sahel |
Scoring by quarter: 20–22, 16–26, 6–24, 13–20
| Pts: Kabange 17; Rebs: Kabange 6 Asts: three players 1 | | Pts: Braa 16; Rebs: Braa 10; Asts: Hardy 3 |

December 15, 2008
16:00

Report

| ASA (Angola) | 96–57 | (Democratic Republic of the Congo) Lupopo |
Scoring by quarter: 33-7, 18-14, 22-11, 23-25
| Pts: F.Abraão 22; Rebs: Watkins 7 Asts: A.Rodrigues 7 | | Pts: Lelo 19; Rebs: Kaninda 6 Asts: Mushima 2 |

December 13, 2008
18:00

Report

| Étoile Sahel (Tunisia) | 103–61 | (Togo) AS Swallows |
Scoring by quarter: 24-8, 27-14, 23-24, 29-15
| Pts: Hardy 24; Rebs: Romdhane 10; Asts: Hardy 3 | | Pts: Bouraïma 32; Rebs: Bouraïma 5 Asts: three players 1 |

December 13, 2008
20:00

Report

| Kano Pillars (Nigeria) | 69–59 | (Angola) ASA |
Scoring by quarter: 20–20, 11–12, 25–16, 13–11
| Pts: Gumut 17; Rebs: Ebikoro 16; Asts: Onmonya 2 | | Pts: C.Oliveira 13; Rebs: F.Abraão 5 Asts: Quimbamba 3 |

December 18, 2008
14:00

Report

| APR (Rwanda) | 90–74 | (Democratic Republic of the Congo) Lupopo |
Scoring by quarter: 24–16, 28-17, 15–17, 23–24
| Pts: Ntwari 22; Rebs: Kabange, Kabangu 8 Asts: Nikobahoze 7 | | Pts: Lelo 20; Rebs: Manga 10; Asts: Shandiabana 8 |

December 14, 2008
14:00

Report

| AS Swallows (Togo) | 50–92 | (Angola) ASA |
Scoring by quarter: 21–24, 12–19, 6–23, 11–26
| Pts: Bouraïma, Ayayi 11; Rebs: Diaby 10; Asts: Diaby 3 | | Pts: J.Santos 21; Rebs: F.Abraão, Da Mata 6 Asts: A.Rodrigues 7 |

December 14, 2008
16:00

Report

| APR (Rwanda) | 62–71 | (Nigeria) Kano Pillars |
Scoring by quarter: 8–21, 13–16, 17–19, 24–15
| Pts: Toh 14; Rebs: D.Kone 13; Asts: Kouadio, K.Kone 3 | | Pts: Okwirry 10; Rebs: Kabangu 8 Asts: Kabange 2 |

December 14, 2008
18:00

| Lupopo (Democratic Republic of the Congo) | 0–20 | (Tunisia) Étoile Sahel |
Scoring by quarter: n/a
| Pts: n/a Rebs: n/a Asts: n/a | | Pts: n/a Rebs: n/a Asts: n/a |

December 16, 2008
14:00

Report

| Lupopo (Democratic Republic of the Congo) | 65–102 | (Nigeria) Kano Pillars |
Scoring by quarter: 17-25, 19-27, 10-30, 19-20
| Pts: Mushima 19; Rebs: Kabasu 4 Asts: Kaninda 1 | | Pts: Usman 22; Rebs: Onmonya 5 Asts: three players 1 |

December 16, 2008
16:00

Report

| AS Swallows (Togo) | 67–89 | (Rwanda) APR |
Scoring by quarter: 11–20, 20–28, 16–13, 20–28
| Pts: Savadogo, Bouraïma 10; Rebs: Tapsoba 8 Asts: Ajavon 2 | | Pts: Okwirry 17; Rebs: three players 6 Asts: Buzangu 5 |

December 16, 2008
18:00

Report

| Étoile Sahel (Tunisia) | 93–78 | (Angola) ASA |
Scoring by quarter: 38–21, 8–11, 22–23, 25–23
| Pts: Maoua 22; Rebs: Hardy 8 Asts: Hardy 8 | | Pts: J.Santos 23; Rebs: J.Santos, Watkins 3 Asts: n/a |

December 17, 2008
14:00

Report

| Lupopo (Democratic Republic of the Congo) | 59–80 | (Togo) AS Swallows |
Scoring by quarter: 19–21, 14–15, 11–14, 15–30
| Pts: Shandiabana, Mushima 15; Rebs: Manga 11; Asts: three players 1 | | Pts: Bouraïma 19; Rebs: Diaby 10; Asts: Savadogo 4 |

December 17, 2008
18:00

Report

| Étoile Sahel (Tunisia) | 92–64 | (Nigeria) Kano Pillars |
Scoring by quarter: 21–17, 25–19, 31–12, 15–16
| Pts: Hardy 18; Rebs: Romdhane, Braa 5 Asts: Hardy 3 | | Pts: Usman, Ebikoro 15; Rebs: Onmonya 3 Asts: n/a |

December 17, 2008
20:00

Report

| ASA (Angola) | 75–61 | (Rwanda) APR |
Scoring by quarter: 21–15, 17–7, 16–24, 21–15
| Pts: C.Oliveira 17; Rebs: J.Santos 10; Asts: A.Rodrigues 3 | | Pts: Ngandu 17; Rebs: Ngandu 7 Asts: n/a |

=== Group B ===
| Qualified for the quarter-finals |

| | Group B | M | W | L | PF | PA | Diff | P |
|---|---|---|---|---|---|---|---|---|
| 1. | (Angola) Primeiro de Agosto | 5 | 5 | 0 | 402 | 349 | +53 | 10 |
| 2. | (Tunisia) Stade Nabeulien | 5 | 3 | 2 | 411 | 338 | +73 | 8 |
| 3. | (Nigeria) Union Bank | 5 | 3 | 2 | 321 | 304 | +17 | 6 |
| 4. | (Libya) Al Shabab | 5 | 2 | 3 | 302 | 348 | -46 | 2 |
| 5. | (Democratic Republic of the Congo) BC Onatra | 5 | 1 | 4 | 345 | 368 | -23 | 2 |
| 6. | (Guinea) BACK | 5 | 1 | 4 | 311 | 385 | -74 | 2 |

December 15, 2008
14:00

Report

| BC Onatra (Democratic Republic of the Congo) | 64–73 | (Libya) Al Shabab |
Scoring by quarter: 15–26, 18–10, 21–15, 10–22
| Pts: Mutombo 14; Rebs: Saidi 11; Asts: Lukusa 2 | | Pts: Mrsal 23; Rebs: Yagoub 15; Asts: Mrsal, Kaouane 2 |

December 15, 2008
16:00

Report

| BACK (Guinea) | 71–91 | (Nigeria) Union Bank |
Scoring by quarter: 15–24, 18–20, 14–30, 24–17
| Pts: S.Condé 14; Rebs: S.Condé 11; Asts: S.Condé, Gueye 2 | | Pts: Pascual 22; Rebs: Pascual 9 Asts: Dike 4 |

December 15, 2008
18:00

Report

| Stade Nabeulien (Tunisia) | 64–66 | (Angola) 1º de Agosto |
Scoring by quarter: 14–14, 13–11, 20–16, 17–25
| Pts: Knioua 18; Rebs: Kizubanata 6 Asts: four players 1 | | Pts: Kikas 23; Rebs: Jordão 6 Asts: Armando 4 |

December 13, 2008
14:00

Report

| 1º de Agosto (Angola) | 83–47 | (Libya) Al Shabab |
Scoring by quarter: 20–15, 16–11, 26–8, 21–13
| Pts: Olímpio, Kikas 13; Rebs: Ambrósio 12; Asts: three players 2 | | Pts: Mrsal 14; Rebs: Dawo, Yagoub 4 Asts: Yagoub 3 |

December 13, 2008
16:00

Report

| BC Onatra (Democratic Republic of the Congo) | 57–50 | (Guinea) BACK |
Scoring by quarter: 10–9, 15–15, 15–13, 17–13
| Pts: Lukusa 19; Rebs: Lukusa 9 Asts: Mutombo 2 | | Pts: S.Condé 12; Rebs: C.Conde 14; Asts: three players 1 |

December 13, 2008
16:00

Report

| Stade Nabeulien (Tunisia) | 75–54 | (Nigeria) Union Bank |
Scoring by quarter: 28–17, 19–18, 16–6, 12–13
| Pts: Kizubanata 17; Rebs: Kizubanata 9 Asts: Hadidane, Knioua 4 | | Pts: Pascual 14; Rebs: Kasse 8 Asts: Ogunjimi 3 |

December 14, 2008
14:00

Report

| Al Shabab (Libya) | 64–33 | (Guinea) BACK |
Scoring by quarter: 20–12, 9-9, 14-7, 21-5
| Pts: Mrsal 16; Rebs: Yagoub 21; Asts: Yagoub, Elmdawekh 3 | | Pts: S.Condé, C.Conde 10; Rebs: three players 5 Asts: K.Kéita 1 |

December 14, 2008
16:00

Report

| Stade Nabeulien (Tunisia) | 93–38 | (Democratic Republic of the Congo) BC Onatra |
Scoring by quarter: 27–4, 26–8, 19–9, 21–17
| Pts: Mouine, Hadidane 16; Rebs: Seck 8 Asts: Mbarek 5 | | Pts: Lukusa 13; Rebs: Mbowa 9 Asts: n/a |

December 14, 2008
20:00

Report

| Union Bank (Nigeria) | 53–88 | (Angola) 1º de Agosto |
Scoring by quarter: 13–30, 10–25, 22–18, 8–15
| Pts: Kasse 14; Rebs: Kasse 5 Asts: n/a | | Pts: Kikas 17; Rebs: Jordão 8 Asts: 4 Olímpio, Mascarenhas 3 |

December 16, 2008
14:00

Report

| 1º de Agosto (Angola) | 101–50 | (Guinea) BACK |
Scoring by quarter: 22–15, 30–11, 21–6, 28–18
| Pts: Ambrósio 16; Rebs: Ambrósio 11; Asts: Jordão 3 | | Pts: Kaba 10; Rebs: S.Condé 5 Asts: S.Condé, A.Keita 1 |

December 16, 2008
16:00

Report

| Al Shabab (Libya) | 67–63 | (Tunisia) Stade Nabeulien |
Scoring by quarter: 16–10, 17–13, 24–19, 10–21
| Pts: Maye, Dawo 23; Rebs: Yagoub 7 Asts: Kaouane 4 | | Pts: Kizubanata 18; Rebs: Knioua 6 Asts: Kizubanata 4 |

December 16, 2008
20:00

Report

| Union Bank (Nigeria) | 85–70 | (Democratic Republic of the Congo) BC Onatra |
Scoring by quarter: 25–21, 14–18, 34–10, 12–21
| Pts: Yusuf 26; Rebs: Yusuf 7 Asts: four players 1 | | Pts: Lukusa 18; Rebs: Saidi 4 Asts: Mutombo 2 |

December 17, 2008
14:00

Report

| Union Bank (Nigeria) | 57–74 | (Libya) Al Shabab |
Scoring by quarter: 19–27, 12–11, 13–18, 13–18
| Pts: Yusuf 22; Rebs: Kasse 8 Asts: n/a | | Pts: Maye 25; Rebs: Yagoub 15; Asts: Kaouane 5 |

December 17, 2008
16:00

Report

| BACK (Guinea) | 52–86 | (Tunisia) Stade Nabeulien |
Scoring by quarter: 11–20, 10–19, 18–17, 13–30
| Pts: Gueye 12; Rebs: C.Conde 4 Asts: Gueye 1 | | Pts: Hadidane 17; Rebs: Mouine 8 Asts: Hadidane, Mbarek 1 |

December 17, 2008
16:00

Report

| 1º de Agosto (Angola) | 96–62 | (Democratic Republic of the Congo) BC Onatra |
Scoring by quarter: 22–19, 29–11, 27–17, 18–15
| Pts: Ambrósio 27; Rebs: Ambrósio 12; Asts: Ambrósio 5 | | Pts: Mutombo 18; Rebs: Ndelo 7 Asts: n/a |

== Knockout stage ==
9th-12th Place
Friday, 19 December 14:00
(Guinea) BACK | 61
(Togo) AS Swallows | 68
Friday, 19 December 16:00
(Democratic Republic of the Congo) Lupopo | 56
(Democratic Republic of the Congo) BC Onatra | 64

9th place
Saturday, 20 December 14:00
(Togo) AS Swallows | 60
(Democratic Republic of the Congo) BC Onatra | 54
11th place
Saturday, 20 December 12:00
(Guinea) BACK | 69
(Rwanda) Lupopo | 66

Quarter-finals
Friday, 19 December – 18:00
(Nigeria) Union Bank | 67
(Tunisia) Étoile Sahel | 94
Friday, 19 December – 20:00
(Angola) ASA | 63
(Libya) Al Shabab | 44
Friday, 19 December – 16:00
(Tunisia) Stade Nabeulien | 79
(Nigeria) Kano Pillars | 59
Friday, 19 December – 14:00
(Rwanda) APR | 50
(Angola) 1º de Agosto | 87

5th-8th Place
Saturday, 20 December 16:00
(Nigeria) Union Bank | 78
(Libya) Al Shabab | 91
Saturday, 20 December 18:00
(Rwanda) APR | 68
(Nigeria) Kano Pillars | 77

5th place
Sunday, 21 December 14:00
(Libya) Al Shabab | 71
(Nigeria) Kano Pillars | 76
7th place
Sunday, 21 December 10:00
(Nigeria) Union Bank | 65
(Rwanda) APR | 64

Quarter-finals
Friday, 19 December – 18:00
(Nigeria) Union Bank | 67
(Tunisia) Étoile Sahel | 94
Friday, 19 December – 20:00
(Angola) ASA | 63
(Libya) Al Shabab | 44
Friday, 19 December – 16:00
(Tunisia) Stade Nabeulien | 79
(Nigeria) Kano Pillars | 59
Friday, 19 December – 14:00
(Rwanda) APR | 50
(Angola) 1º de Agosto | 87

Semi-finals
Saturday, 20 December 20:00
(Tunisia) Étoile Sahel | 78
(Angola) ASA | 53
Saturday, 20 December 22:00
(Tunisia) Stade Nabeulien | 56
(Angola) 1º de Agosto | 79

Final
Sunday, 21 December – 18:00
(Tunisia) Étoile Sahel | 54
(Angola) 1º de Agosto | 57
Third place
Sunday, 21 December – 16:00
(Angola) ASA | 60
(Tunisia) Stade Nabeulien | 55

=== Quarter-finals ===
December 19, 2008
18:00

Report

| Union Bank (Nigeria) | 67–94 | (Tunisia) Étoile Sahel |
Scoring by quarter: 9–23, 16–26, 21–19, 21–26
| Pts: Ohiero 24; Rebs: Obanye 6 Asts: Ayodele 3 | | Pts: Hardy 23; Rebs: Braa 10; Asts: Hardy 5 |

December 19, 2008
14:00

Report

| APR (Rwanda) | 50–87 | (Angola) 1º de Agosto |
Scoring by quarter: 12–24, 16–24, 7–26, 15–13
| Pts: Buzangu 12; Rebs: Nikobahoze 6 Asts: Buzangu, Barame 3 | | Pts: Olímpio, Armando 14; Rebs: Ambrósio 14; Asts: Olímpio, Armando 5 |

December 19, 2008
16:00

Report

| Stade Nabeulien (Tunisia) | 79–59 | (Nigeria) Kano Pillars |
Scoring by quarter: 10–14, 28–7, 20–20, 21–18
| Pts: Mbarek 18; Rebs: Ghyaza 10; Asts: Hadidane 4 | | Pts: Ebikoro 29; Rebs: Ebikoro 6 Asts: Gumut 2 |

December 19, 2008
20:00

Report

| ASA (Angola) | 63–44 | (Libya) Al Shabab |
Scoring by quarter: 20–13, 16–15, 8–9, 19–7
| Pts: C.Oliveira, J.Santos 14; Rebs: C.Oliveira 14; Asts: four players 1 | | Pts: Maye 21; Rebs: Yagoub 19; Asts: Kaouane 5 |

=== 9th-12th place ===
December 19, 2008
14:00

Report

| BACK (Guinea) | 61–68 | (Togo) AS Swallows |
Scoring by quarter: 20–15, 11–16, 14–17, 16–20
| Pts: Bah 26; Rebs: C.Conde 9 Asts: K.Kéita 2 | | Pts: Diaby 13; Rebs: Diaby 6 Asts: Savadogo 7 |

December 19, 2006
16:00

Report

| Lupopo (Democratic Republic of the Congo) | 56–64 | (Democratic Republic of the Congo) BC Onatra |
Scoring by quarter: 7–24, 22–11, 14–17, 13–12
| Pts: Manga 11; Rebs: Manga 8 Asts: Bin 3 | | Pts: Lukusa 20; Rebs: Mbowa 7 Asts: Nkatu 2 |

=== 5th-8th place ===
December 20, 2006
16:00

Report

| Union Bank (Nigeria) | 78–91 | (Libya) Al Shabab |
Scoring by quarter: 23–17, 25–15, 15–31, 15–28
| Pts: Obanye 17; Rebs: Aguara 6 Asts: Ayodele 5 | | Pts: Mrsal 33; Rebs: Yagoub 11; Asts: Mrsal 4 |

December 20, 2006
18:00

Report

| APR (Rwanda) | 68–77 | (Nigeria) Kano Pillars |
Scoring by quarter: 17–15, 23–23, 19–21, 9–18
| Pts: Kabangu 15; Rebs: Kabangu 9 Asts: Kabangu 4 | | Pts: Sule 14; Rebs: Onmonya 5 Asts: Mohammed, Usman 1 |

=== Semifinals ===
December 20, 2006
20:00

Report

| Étoile Sahel (Tunisia) | 78–53 | (Angola) ASA |
Scoring by quarter: 21–20, 21–12, 20–9, 16–12
| Pts: Maoua, Battles 16; Rebs: Battles 8 Asts: Hardy 5 | | Pts: J.Santos 19; Rebs: J.Santos, F.Abraão 5 Asts: F.Abraão, E.Ventura 1 |

December 20, 2008
22:00

Report

| 1º de Agosto (Angola) | 79–56 | (Tunisia) Stade Nabeulien |
Scoring by quarter: 19–14, 16–19, 26–13, 18–10
| Pts: Olímpio 22; Rebs: Kikas, Mascarenhas 10; Asts: Armando 5 | | Pts: Hadidane 14; Rebs: Hadidane 3 Asts: Knioua 2 |

=== 11th place ===
December 20, 2008
12:00

Report

| BACK (Guinea) | 69–66 | (Democratic Republic of the Congo) Lupopo |
Scoring by quarter: 19–20, 15–17, 12–10, 23–19
| Pts: n/a Rebs: n/a Asts: n/a | | Pts: Kaninda 23; Rebs: Kaninda 16; Asts: Mushima, Lelo 4 |

=== 9th place ===
December 20, 2008
14:00

Report

| AS Swallows (Togo) | 60–54 | (Democratic Republic of the Congo) BC Onatra |
Scoring by quarter: 10–15, 17–13, 22–13, 11–13
| Pts: Diaby 14; Rebs: Saibou 13; Asts: three players 2 | | Pts: Lukusa 16; Rebs: Saidi 6 Asts: Lukusa, Mbowa 1 |

=== 7th place ===
December 21, 2008
10:00

Report

| Union Bank (Nigeria) | 65–64 | (Rwanda) APR |
Scoring by quarter: 18–11, 12–14, 18–13, 17–26
| Pts: Yusuf 17; Rebs: Mohammed 5 Asts: three players 1 | | Pts: Buzangu 28; Rebs: Ngandu 6 Asts: three players 1 |

=== 5th place ===
December 21, 2008
14:00

Report

| Al Shabab (Libya) | 71–76 | (Nigeria) Kano Pillars |
Scoring by quarter: 19–24, 11–17, 18–12, 23–23
| Pts: Maye 29; Rebs: Maye, Yagoub 9 Asts: Kaouane 9 | | Pts: Usman 26; Rebs: Ebikoro 8 Asts: Usman 4 |

=== Bronze medal game ===
December 21, 2008
16:00

Report

| ASA (Angola) | 60–55 | (Tunisia) Stade Nabeulien |
Scoring by quarter: 15–11, 14–19, 23–16, 8–9
| Pts: J.Santos 16; Rebs: Quimbamba 8 Asts: Quimbamba 6 | | Pts: Kizubanata 10; Rebs: Kizubanata, Hadidane 9 Asts: Kizubanata, Trabelsi 3 |

=== Gold medal game ===
December 21, 2008
18:00

Report

| Étoile Sahel (Tunisia) | 54–57 | (Angola) 1º de Agosto |
Scoring by quarter: 11–15, 10–10, 14–17, 19–15
| Pts: Khenfir 15; Rebs: Maoua 7 Asts: Maoua 1 | | Pts: Jordão 15; Rebs: Kikas 10; Asts: Kikas 2 |

== Final standings ==
| Rank | Team | Record |
|---|---|---|
| Gold medal | (Angola) Primeiro de Agosto | 8–0 |
| Silver medal | (Tunisia) Étoile Sahel | 7–1 |
| Bronze medal | (Angola) ASA | 6–2 |
| 4 | (Tunisia) Stade Nabeulien | 4–4 |
| 5 | (Nigeria) Kano Pillars | 4–4 |
| 6 | (Libya) Al Shabab | 3–5 |
| 7 | (Nigeria) Union Bank | 4–4 |
| 8 | (Rwanda) APR | 4–4 |
| 9 | (Togo) AS Swallows | 3–4 |
| 10 | (Democratic Republic of the Congo) BC Onatra | 2–5 |
| 11 | (Guinea) BACK | 2–5 |
| 12 | (Democratic Republic of the Congo) Lupopo | 1–6 |

Primeiro de Agosto roster
Mayzer Alexandre, Armando Costa, Adilson Baza, Olímpio Cipriano, Joaquim Gomes, Felizardo Ambrósio, Vladimir Ricardino, Francisco Jordão, Simão João, Carlos Almeida, Miguel Lutonda, Rodrigo Mascarenhas Coach: Luís Magalhães

== All Tournament Team ==
| (Tunisia) Omar Mouhli |
| (Libya) Mohamed Mrsal |
| (Tunisia) Atef Maoua |
| (Nigeria) Dennis Ebikoro |
| (Angola) Joaquim Gomes "Kikas" |

2008 FIBA Africa Clubs Champions Cup

Clube Desportivo Primeiro de Agosto
4th Title

Most Valuable Player
(Angola) Joaquim Gomes "Kikas"

== See also ==
- 2009 FIBA Africa Championship
