= 2006 NBA draft =

Basketball player selection

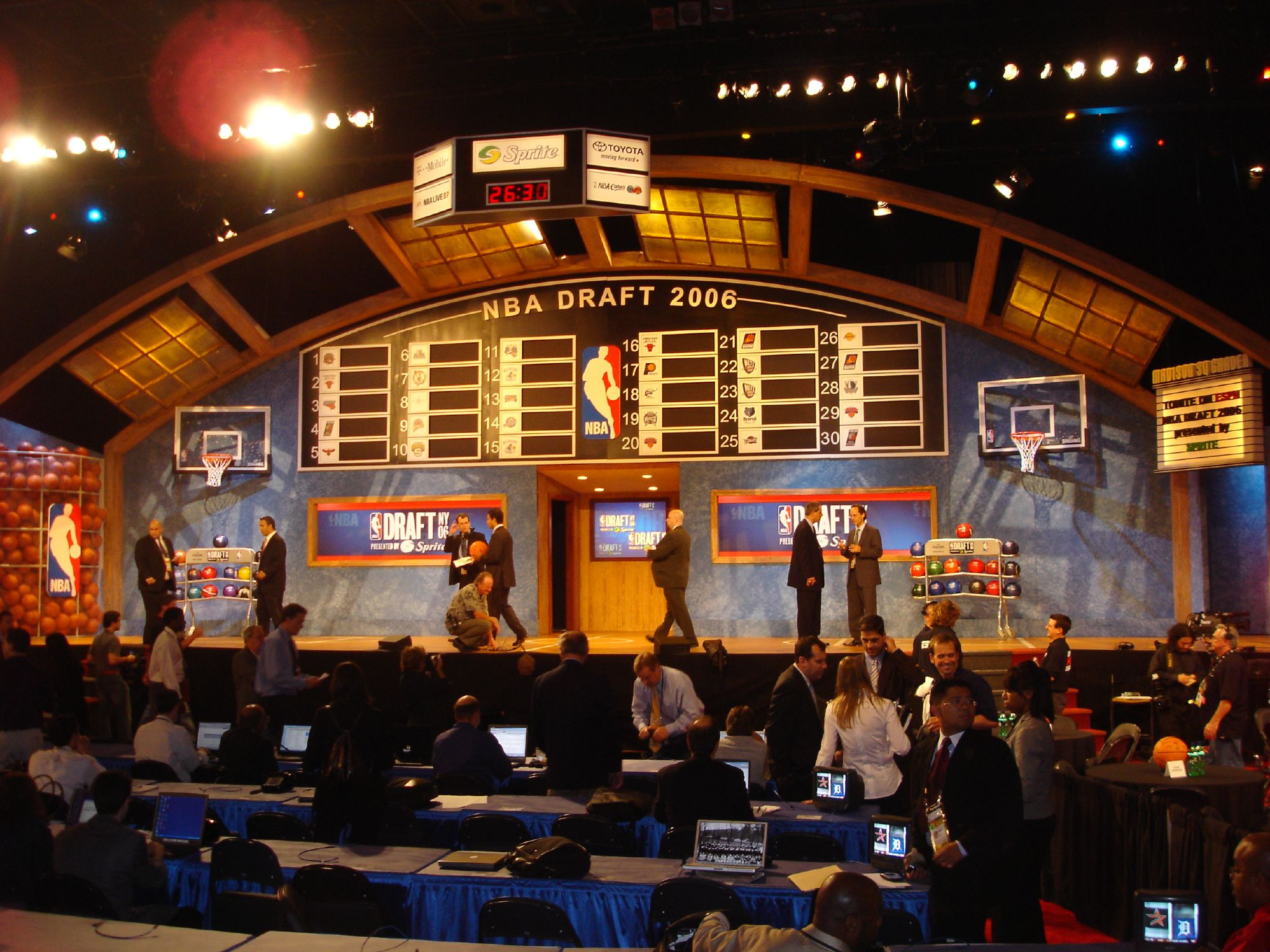

General information
- Sport: Basketball
- Date: June 28, 2006
- Location: The Theater at Madison Square Garden (New York City, New York)
- Network: ESPN

Overview
- 60 total selections in 2 rounds
- League: NBA
- First selection: Andrea Bargnani (Toronto Raptors)

The 2006 NBA draft was held on June 28, 2006, at The Theater at Madison Square Garden in New York City and was broadcast in the United States on ESPN. In this draft, National Basketball Association (NBA) teams took turns selecting amateur U.S. college basketball players and other eligible players, including international players. This was also the only time the New Orleans Hornets would draft under the temporary name of the New Orleans/Oklahoma City Hornets as the city of New Orleans was still recovering from the events of Hurricane Katrina after the 2005-06 NBA season.

Italian Andrea Bargnani was selected first overall by the Toronto Raptors, who won the draft lottery. Bargnani became the second player without competitive experience in the United States to be drafted first overall, after Yao Ming was picked first overall in the 2002 NBA draft. Prior to the draft, Bargnani was playing with Italian club Benetton Treviso for 3 years. Sixth-overall pick Brandon Roy from University of Washington was named Rookie of the Year for the 2006–07 season. Roy was originally drafted by the Minnesota Timberwolves but his draft rights were traded to the Portland Trail Blazers on draft day. Portland also acquired the draft rights to the second-overall pick from the University of Texas, LaMarcus Aldridge from the Chicago Bulls on draft day.

The University of Connecticut had four players selected in the first round, tying the record set by Duke University in 1999 and the University of North Carolina in 2005. These players were Rudy Gay, Hilton Armstrong, Marcus Williams, and Josh Boone. With Denham Brown also selected in the second round, Connecticut became the first school ever to have five players selected in a two-round draft. Connecticut joined eight other schools that had five players selected in a single draft, second only to UNLV, who had six players selected in the eight-round 1977 draft. The last remaining active member of this draft class was Kyle Lowry, who announced his retirement during the 2025–26 NBA season. This is also the most recent season which has no active players.

== Draft selections ==
PG	Point guard	SG	Shooting guard	SF	Small forward	PF	Power forward	C	Center

*	Denotes player who has been selected for at least one All-Star Game and All-NBA Team
^{+}	Denotes player who has been selected for at least one All-Star Game
^{#}	Denotes player who has never appeared in an NBA regular-season or playoff game
^{~}	Denotes player who has been selected as Rookie of the Year

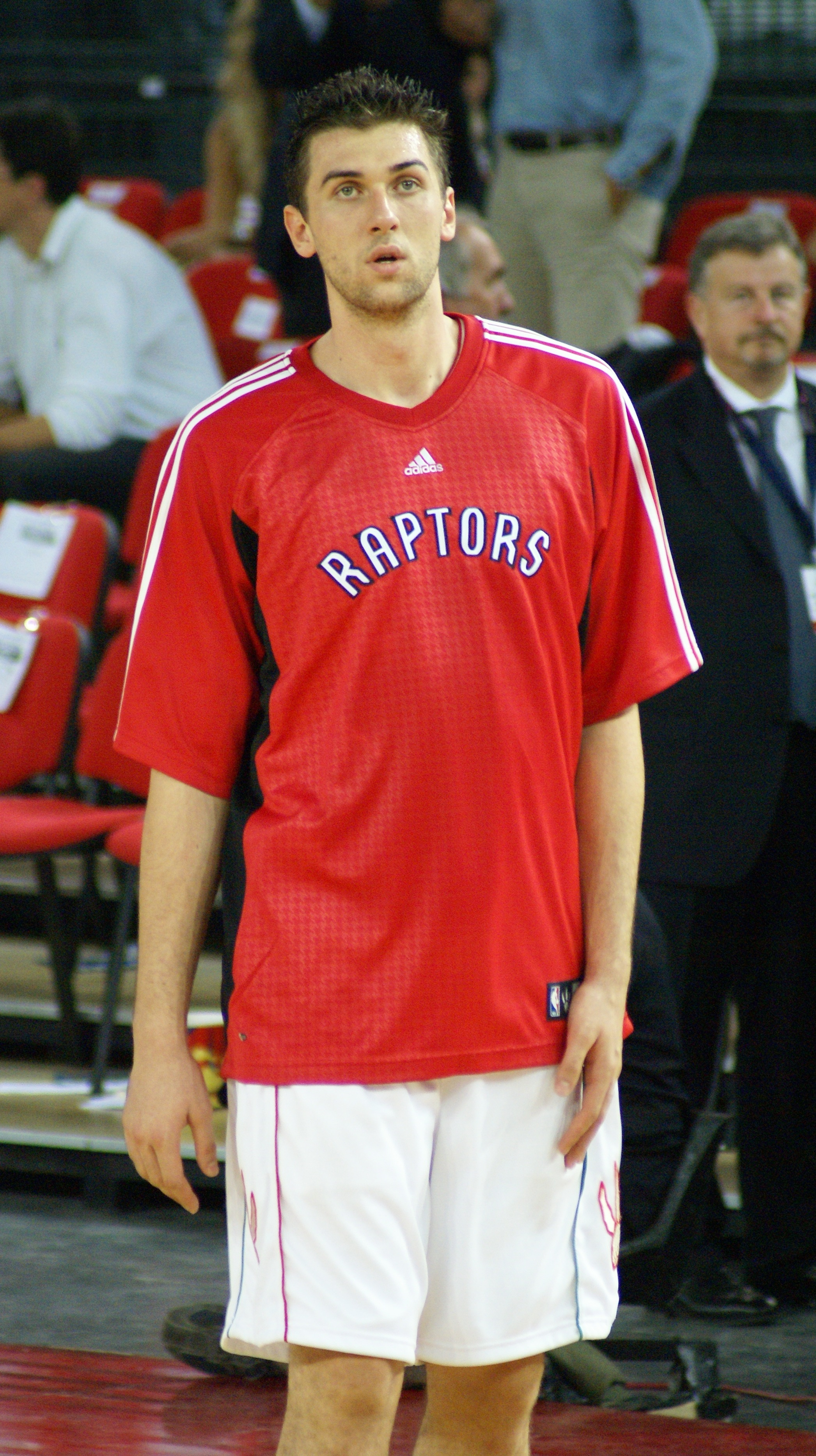
Andrea Bargnani was the first Italian-born player to be selected as the #1 overall pick. He was selected by the Toronto Raptors.

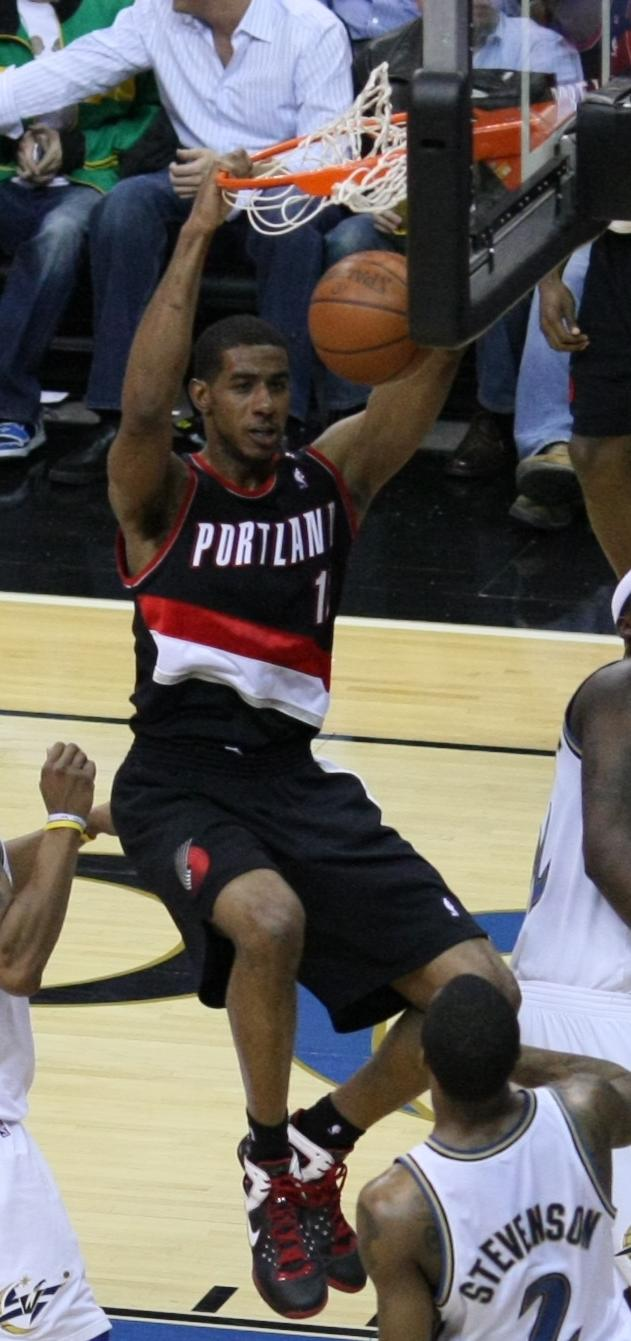
LaMarcus Aldridge, was picked 2nd overall by the Chicago Bulls. His draft rights were traded to the Portland Trail Blazers.

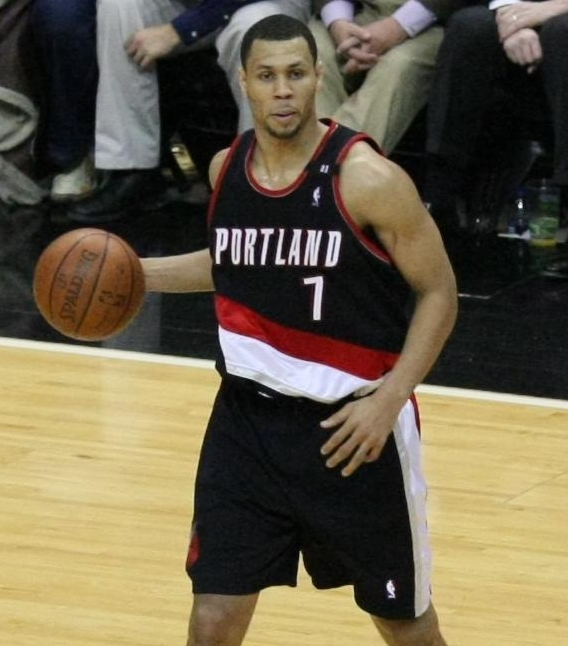
Brandon Roy was selected 6th by the Minnesota Timberwolves. His draft rights were traded to the Portland Trail Blazers.

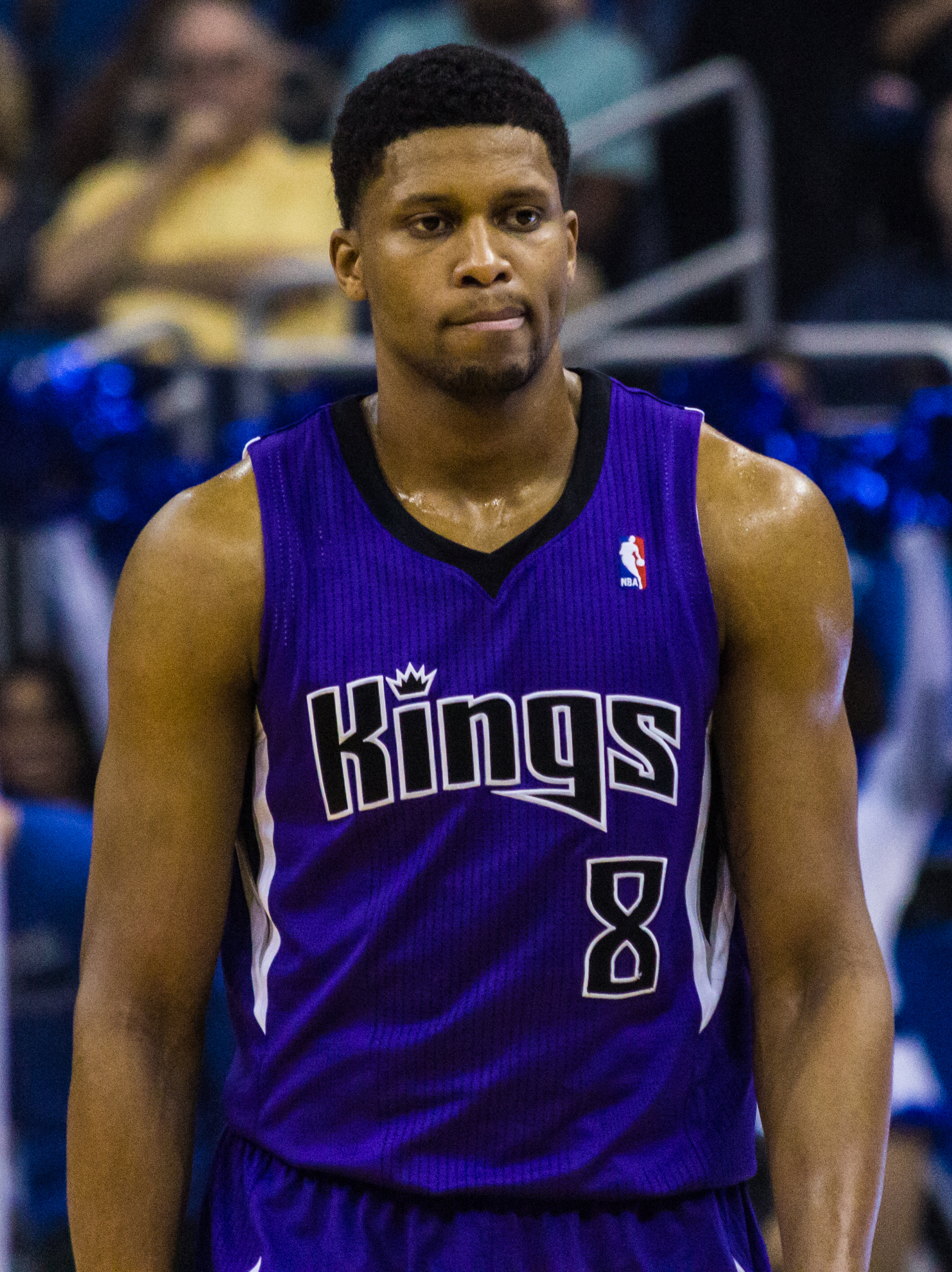
Rudy Gay was picked 8th by the Houston Rockets. His draft rights were later traded to the Memphis Grizzlies.

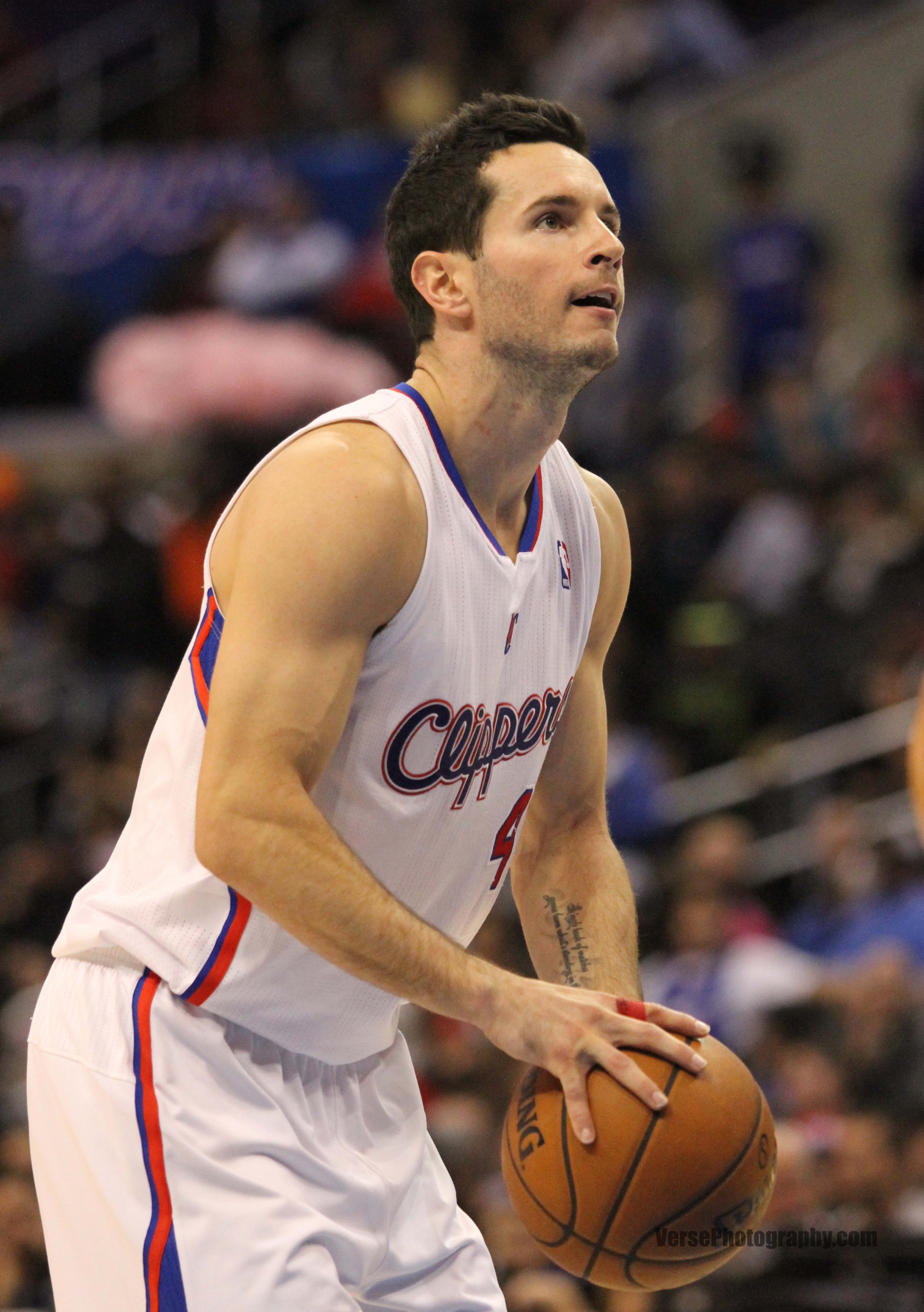
JJ Redick was picked 11th overall by the Orlando Magic.

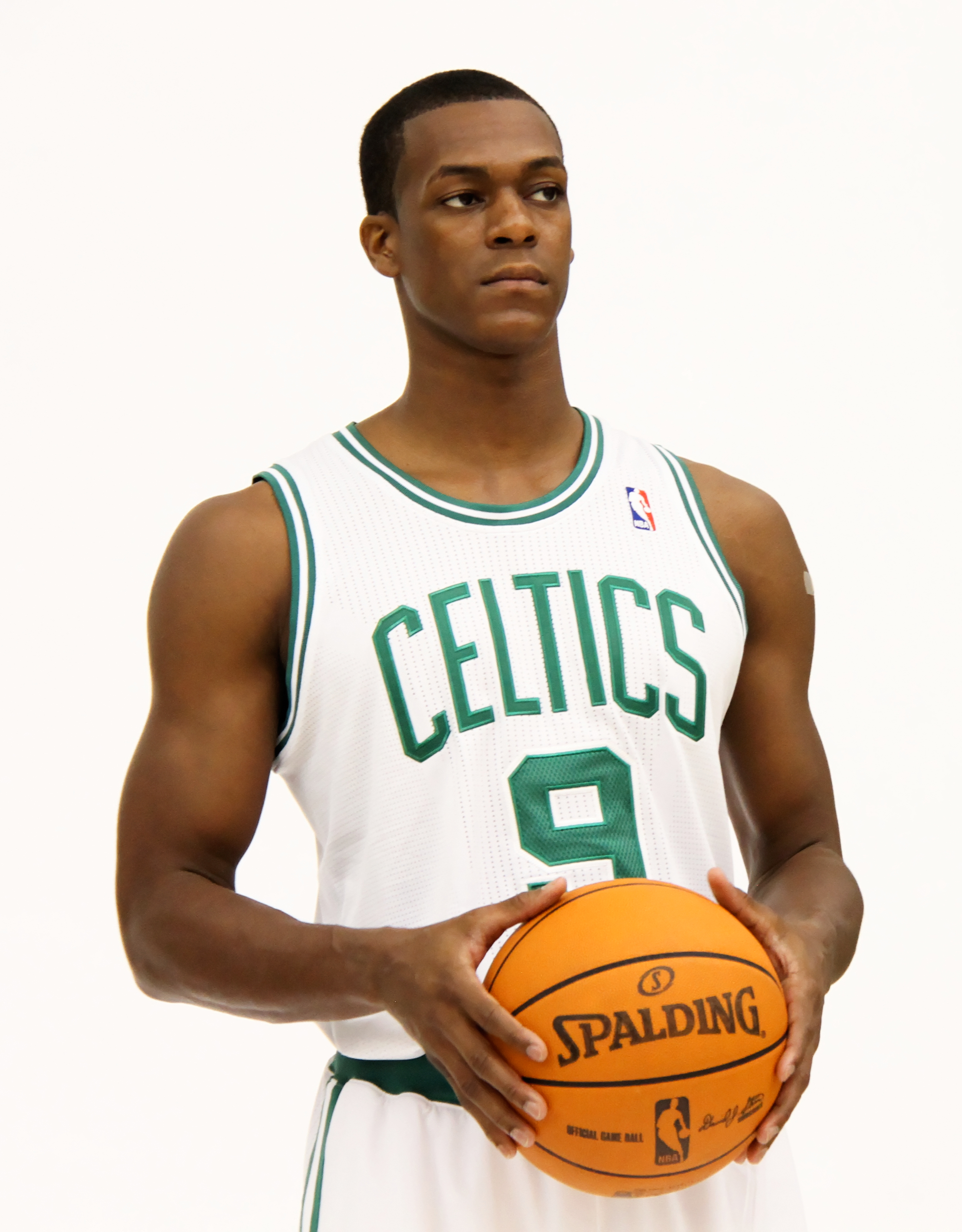
Rajon Rondo was picked 21st by the Phoenix Suns. His draft rights were later traded to the Boston Celtics.

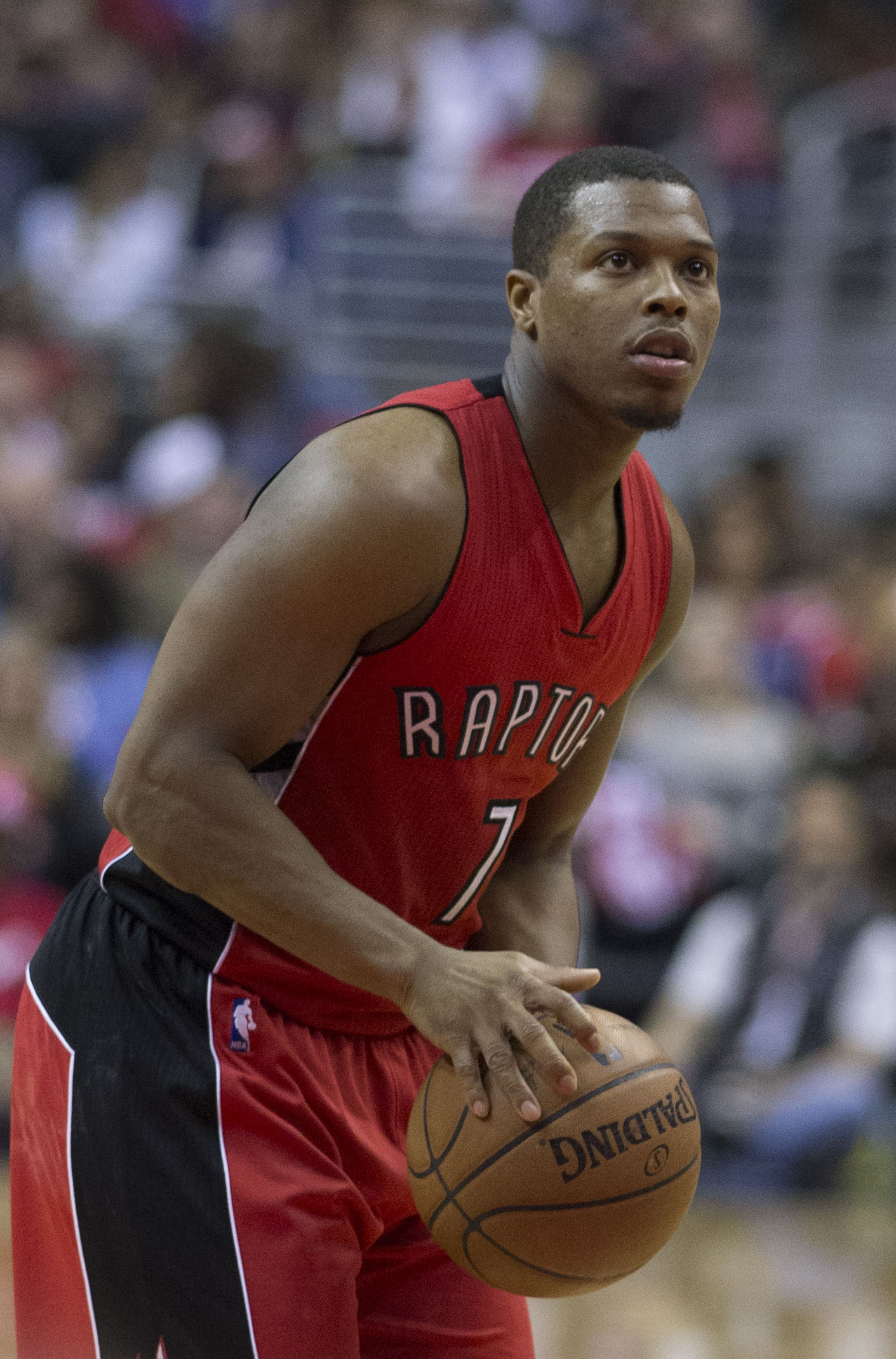
Kyle Lowry was picked 24th by the Memphis Grizzlies.

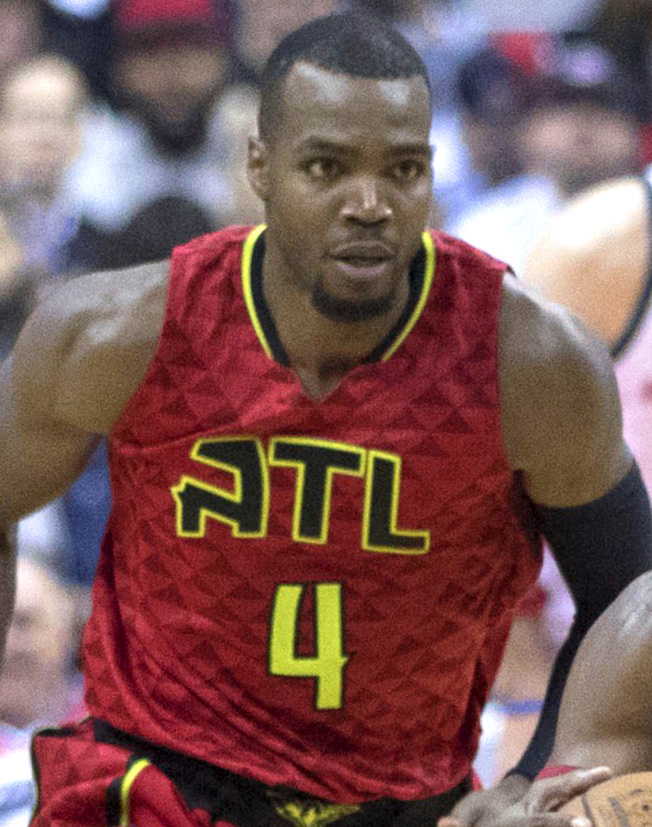
Paul Millsap was picked 47th by the Utah Jazz.

Round	Pick	Player	Position	Nationality (Note: Nationality indicates the player's national team or representative nationality. If a player has not competed at the international level, then the nationality indicates the national team which the player is eligible to represent according to FIBA rules.)	Team	School/club team
1	1	Andrea Bargnani	PF	Italy	Toronto Raptors	Benetton Treviso (Italy)
1	2	LaMarcus Aldridge*	PF	United States	Chicago Bulls (from New York, traded to Portland)^{[o]}^{[a]}	Texas (So.)
1	3	Adam Morrison	SF	United States	Charlotte Bobcats	Gonzaga (Jr.)
1	4	Tyrus Thomas	PF	United States	Portland Trail Blazers (traded to Chicago)^{[a]}	LSU (Fr.)
1	5	Shelden Williams	PF	United States	Atlanta Hawks	Duke (Sr.)
1	6	Brandon Roy^{*~}	SG	United States	Minnesota Timberwolves (traded to Portland)^{[b]}	Washington (Sr.)
1	7	Randy Foye	SG	United States	Boston Celtics (traded to Minnesota via Portland)^{[b]}	Villanova (Sr.)
1	8	Rudy Gay	SF	United States	Houston Rockets (traded to Memphis)^{[c]}	Connecticut (So.)
1	9	Patrick O'Bryant	C	United States	Golden State Warriors	Bradley (So.)
1	10	Mouhamed Sene	C	Senegal	Seattle SuperSonics	Verviers-Pepinster (Belgium)
1	11	JJ Redick	SG	United States	Orlando Magic	Duke (Sr.)
1	12	Hilton Armstrong	C	United States	New Orleans/Oklahoma City Hornets	Connecticut (Sr.)
1	13	Thabo Sefolosha	SG	Switzerland	Philadelphia 76ers (traded to Chicago)^{[d]}	Angelico Biella (Italy)
1	14	Ronnie Brewer	SG	United States	Utah Jazz	Arkansas (Jr.)
1	15	Cedric Simmons	SF	United States	New Orleans/Oklahoma City Hornets (from Milwaukee)^{[p]}	NC State (So.)
1	16	Rodney Carney	SF	United States	Chicago Bulls (traded to Philadelphia)^{[d]}	Memphis (Sr.)
1	17	Shawne Williams	PF	United States	Indiana Pacers	Memphis (Fr.)
1	18	Oleksiy Pecherov	C	Ukraine	Washington Wizards	BC Kyiv (Ukraine)
1	19	Quincy Douby	G	United States	Sacramento Kings	Rutgers (Jr.)
1	20	Renaldo Balkman	F	Puerto Rico	New York Knicks (from Denver via New Jersey and Toronto)^{[q]}	South Carolina (Jr.)
1	21	Rajon Rondo^{*}	PG	United States	Phoenix Suns (from L.A. Lakers via Boston and Atlanta, traded to Boston)^{[r]}^{[e]}	Kentucky (So.)
1	22	Marcus Williams	G	United States	New Jersey Nets (from L.A. Clippers via Orlando and Denver)^{[s]}	Connecticut (Jr.)
1	23	Josh Boone	F	United States	New Jersey Nets	Connecticut (Jr.)
1	24	Kyle Lowry^{*}	PG	United States	Memphis Grizzlies	Villanova (So.)
1	25	Shannon Brown	G	United States	Cleveland Cavaliers	Michigan State (Jr.)
1	26	Jordan Farmar	G	United States	Los Angeles Lakers (from Miami)^{[t]}	UCLA (So.)
1	27	Sergio Rodríguez	G	Spain	Phoenix Suns (traded to Portland)^{[f]}	Adecco Estudiantes (Spain)
1	28	Maurice Ager	G	United States	Dallas Mavericks	Michigan State (Sr.)
1	29	Mardy Collins	G	United States	New York Knicks (from San Antonio)^{[u]}	Temple (Sr.)
1	30	Joel Freeland	C	United Kingdom	Portland Trail Blazers (from Detroit via Utah)^{[v]}	Gran Canaria (Spain)
2	31	James White	G	United States	Portland Trail Blazers (traded to Indiana)^{[g]}	Cincinnati (Sr.)
2	32	Steve Novak	SF	United States	Houston Rockets (from New York)^{[w]}	Marquette (Sr.)
2	33	Solomon Jones	F	United States	Atlanta Hawks	South Florida (Sr.)
2	34	Paul Davis	C	United States	Los Angeles Clippers (from Charlotte)^{[x]}	Michigan State (Sr.)
2	35	P. J. Tucker	F	United States	Toronto Raptors	Texas (Jr.)
2	36	Craig Smith	F	United States	Minnesota Timberwolves (from Boston)^{[y]}	Boston College (Sr.)
2	37	Bobby Jones	F	United States	Minnesota Timberwolves (traded to Philadelphia)^{[h]}	Washington (Sr.)
2	38	Kosta Perović	C	Serbia	Golden State Warriors	Partizan Belgrade (Serbia)
2	39	David Noel	F	United States	Milwaukee Bucks (from Houston)^{[z]}	North Carolina (Sr.)
2	40	Denham Brown^{#}	G	Canada	Seattle SuperSonics	Connecticut (Sr.)
2	41	James Augustine	F	United States	Orlando Magic	Illinois (Sr.)
2	42	Daniel Gibson	G	United States	Cleveland Cavaliers (from Philadelphia)^{[aa]}	Texas (So.)
2	43	Marcus Vinicius	F	Brazil	New Orleans/Oklahoma City Hornets	Objetivo São Carlos (Brazil)
2	44	Lior Eliyahu^{#}	F	Israel	Orlando Magic (from Milwaukee via Cleveland, traded to Houston)^{[ab]}^{[i]}	Hapoel Galil Elyon (Israel)
2	45	Alexander Johnson	F	United States	Indiana Pacers (traded to Memphis via Portland)^{[g]}	Florida State (Jr.)
2	46	Dee Brown	G	United States	Utah Jazz (from Chicago via Houston)^{[ac]}	Illinois (Sr.)
2	47	Paul Millsap^{+}	PF	United States	Utah Jazz	Louisiana Tech (Jr.)
2	48	Vladimir Veremeenko^{#}	F	Belarus	Washington Wizards	Dynamo St. Petersburg (Russia)
2	49	Leon Powe	F	United States	Denver Nuggets (traded to Boston)^{[j]}	California (Jr.)
2	50	Ryan Hollins	C	United States	Charlotte Bobcats (from Sacramento)^{[ad]}	UCLA (Sr.)
2	51	Cheikh Samb	C	Senegal	Los Angeles Lakers (traded to Detroit)^{[k]}	WTC Cornellà (Spain)
2	52	Guillermo Diaz	G	Puerto Rico	Los Angeles Clippers	Miami (FL) (Jr.)
2	53	Yotam Halperin^{#}	G	Israel	Seattle SuperSonics (from Memphis)^{[ae]}	Union Olimpija (Slovenia)
2	54	Hassan Adams	G	United States	New Jersey Nets	Arizona (Sr.)
2	55	Ejike Ugboaja^{#}	F	Nigeria	Cleveland Cavaliers	Union Bank Lagos (Nigeria)
2	56	Edin Bavčić^{#}	F	Bosnia and Herzegovina	Toronto Raptors (from Miami via Boston and New Orleans/Oklahoma City, traded to Philadelphia)^{[af]}^{[l]}	ASA BH Telecom (Bosnia and Herzegovina)
2	57	Loukas Mavrokefalidis^{#}	C	Greece	Minnesota Timberwolves (from Phoenix)^{[ag]}	PAOK (Greece)
2	58	J. R. Pinnock^{#}	G	United States	Dallas Mavericks (traded to L.A. Lakers)^{[m]}	George Washington (Jr.)
2	59	Damir Markota	F	Croatia	San Antonio Spurs (traded to Milwaukee)^{[n]}	Cibona Zagreb (Croatia)
2	60	Will Blalock	G	United States	Detroit Pistons	Iowa State (Jr.)

== Notable undrafted players ==
Some of these players not selected in this year's draft have played in the NBA.

Player	Position	Nationality	School/club team
Louis Amundson	F	United States	UNLV (Sr.)
José Juan Barea	PG	Puerto Rico	Northeastern (Sr.)
Cedric Bozeman	G/F	United States	UCLA (Sr.)
Chris Copeland	SF	United States	Colorado (Sr.)
Thomas Gardner	SG	United States	Missouri (Jr.)
Mike Hall	SF	United States	George Washington (Sr.)
Robert Hite	PG/SG	United States	Miami (Florida) (Sr.)
Chris Hunter	C	United States	Michigan (Jr.)
Dontell Jefferson	SG	United States	Arkansas (Sr.)
Eugene Jeter	PG	United States; Ukraine	Portland (Sr.)
Carldell Johnson	PG	United States	UAB (Sr.)
Tarence Kinsey	SG	United States	South Carolina (Sr.)
Chris McCray	SG	United States	Maryland (Sr.)
Pops Mensah-Bonsu	PF	United Kingdom	George Washington (Sr.)
Larry Owens	SF/SG	United States	Oral Roberts (Sr.)
Chris Quinn	PG	United States	Notre Dame (Sr.)
Allan Ray	SG/PG	United States	Villanova (Sr.)
Jeremy Richardson	SG/SF	United States	Delta State (Sr.)
Walker Russell Jr.	PG	United States	Jacksonville State (Sr.)
Steven Smith	SF/PF	United States	La Salle (Sr.)
Darius Washington Jr.	PG/SG	United States; Macedonia	Memphis (So.)
C. J. Watson	G	United States	Tennessee (Sr.)
Justin Williams	PF/C	United States	Wyoming (Sr.)

== Trades involving draft picks ==
=== Draft-day trades ===
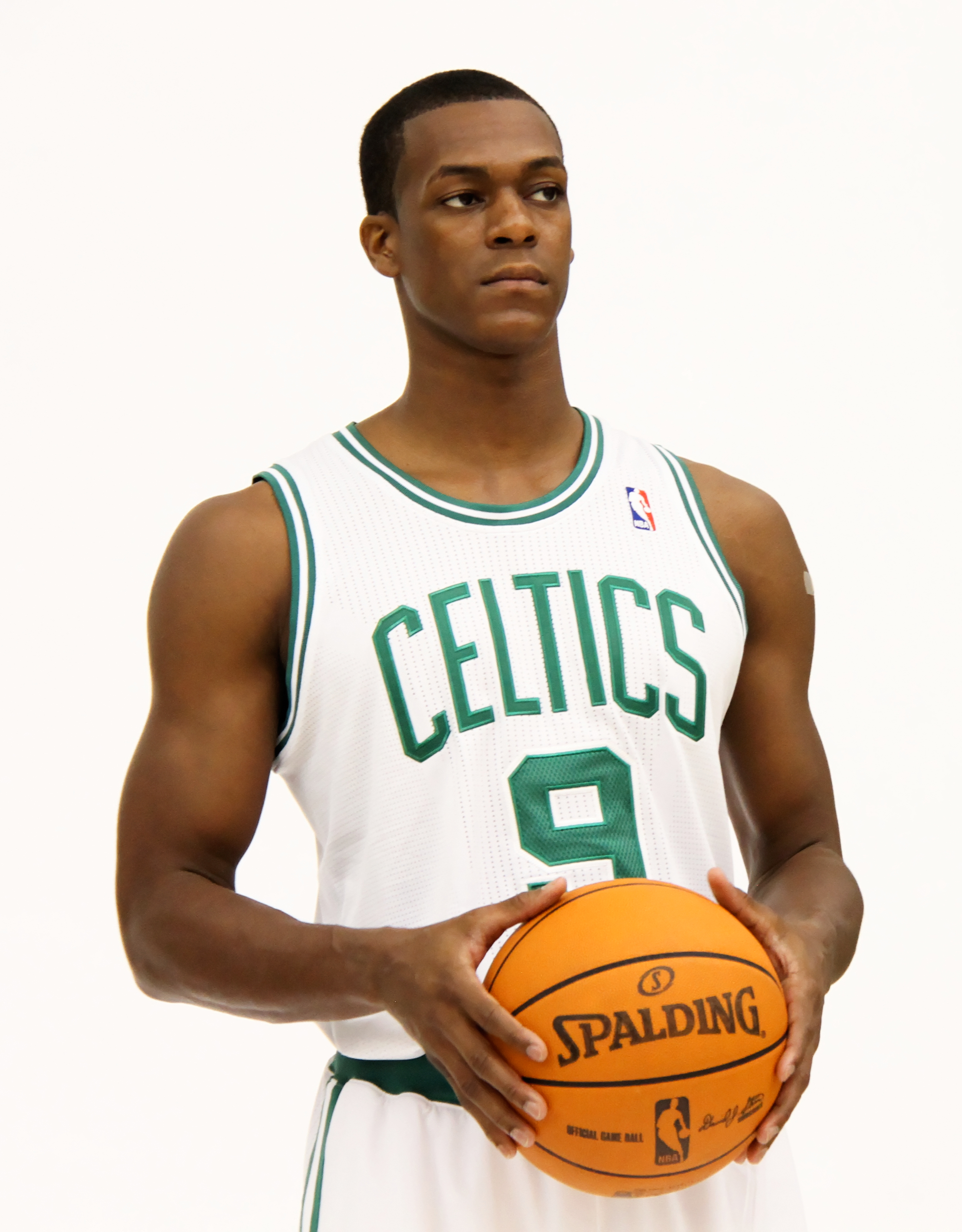
Rajon Rondo, the 21st pick of the Phoenix Suns, and was traded to the Boston Celtics.

The following trades involving drafted players were made on the day of the draft.

- ^{a 1} ^{2} Portland acquired the draft rights to 2nd pick LaMarcus Aldridge and a 2007 second-round draft pick from Chicago in exchange for the draft rights to 4th pick Tyrus Thomas and Viktor Khryapa.
- ^{b 1} ^{2} Portland acquired the draft rights to 6th pick Brandon Roy from Minnesota in exchange for the draft rights to 7th pick Randy Foye. Previously, Portland acquired the draft rights to 7th pick Randy Foye, Raef LaFrentz and Dan Dickau from Boston in exchange for Sebastian Telfair, Theo Ratliff and a 2008 second-round draft pick.
- ^{c} Memphis acquired the draft rights to 8th pick Rudy Gay and Stromile Swift from Houston in exchange for Shane Battier. The trade was finalized on July 12, 2006.
- ^{d 1} ^{2} Chicago acquired the draft rights to 13th pick Thabo Sefolosha from Philadelphia in exchange for the draft rights to 16th pick Rodney Carney, a 2007 second-round draft pick and cash considerations.
- ^{e} Boston acquired the draft rights to 21st pick Rajon Rondo, Brian Grant and cash considerations from Phoenix in exchange for a 2007 first-round draft pick.
- ^{f} Portland acquired the draft rights to 27th pick Sergio Rodríguez from Phoenix in exchange for cash considerations.
- ^{g 1} ^{2} Memphis acquired the draft rights to 45th pick Alexander Johnson from Portland in exchange for a 2008 second-round draft pick. Previously, Portland acquired the draft rights to 45th pick Alexander Johnson, 2007 and 2008 second-round draft picks from Indiana in exchange for the draft rights to 31st pick James White.
- ^{h} Philadelphia acquired the draft rights to 37th pick Bobby Jones from Minnesota in exchange for a 2007 second-round draft pick and cash considerations.
- ^{i} Houston acquired the draft rights to 44th pick Lior Eliyahu from Orlando in exchange for cash considerations.
- ^{j} Boston acquired the draft rights to 49th pick Leon Powe from Denver in exchange for a 2007 second-round draft pick.
- ^{k} Detroit acquired the draft rights to 51st pick Cheikh Samb from the L.A. Lakers in exchange for Maurice Evans.
- ^{l} Philadelphia acquired the draft rights to 56th pick Edin Bavčić from Toronto in exchange for cash considerations.
- ^{m} The L.A. Lakers acquired the draft rights to 58th pick J. R. Pinnock from Dallas in exchange for a 2007 second-round draft pick.
- ^{n} Milwaukee acquired the draft rights to 59th pick Damir Markota from San Antonio in exchange for a 2007 second-round draft pick.

=== Pre-draft trades ===
Prior to the day of the draft, the following trades were made and resulted in exchanges of draft picks between the teams.

- ^{o 1} ^{2} On October 4, 2005, Chicago acquired a 2006 first-round draft pick, an option to exchange 2007 first-round draft picks, 2007 and 2009 second-round draft picks, Tim Thomas, Michael Sweetney and Jermaine Jackson from New York in exchange for Eddy Curry and Antonio Davis. Chicago used the 2nd pick to draft LaMarcus Aldridge.
- ^{p} On October 26, 2005, New Orleans/Oklahoma City acquired a 2006 first-round draft pick, Desmond Mason and cash considerations from Milwaukee in exchange for Jamaal Magloire. New Orleans/Oklahoma City used the 15th pick to draft Cedric Simmons.
- ^{q} On February 3, 2006, New York acquired Denver's 2006 first-round draft pick and Jalen Rose from Toronto in exchange for Antonio Davis. Previously, Toronto acquired Philadelphia's 2005 and Denver's 2006 first-round draft picks, Alonzo Mourning, Eric Williams, Aaron Williams on December 17, 2004, from New Jersey in exchange for Vince Carter. Previously, New Jersey acquired Philadelphia's 2005, Denver's 2006 and L.A. Clippers' 2006 first-round draft picks on July 15, 2004, from Denver in exchange for Kenyon Martin. New York used the 20th pick to draft Renaldo Balkman.
- ^{r} On August 19, 2005, Phoenix acquired L.A. Lakers' 2006 and Atlanta's 2007 first-round draft picks and Boris Diaw from Atlanta in exchange for Joe Johnson. Previously, Atlanta acquired L.A. Lakers' 2006 first-round draft pick, Gary Payton, Tom Gugliotta and Michael Stewart on February 24, 2005, from Boston in exchange for Antoine Walker. Previously, Boston acquired a 2006 first-round draft pick, Gary Payton, Rick Fox and cash considerations on August 13, 2004, from the L.A. Lakers in exchange for Chris Mihm, Chucky Atkins and Jumaine Jones. Phoenix used the 21st pick to draft Rajon Rondo.
- ^{s} On July 15, 2005, New Jersey acquired Philadelphia's 2005, Denver's 2006 and L.A. Clippers' 2006 first-round draft picks from Denver in exchange for Kenyon Martin. Previously, Denver acquired L.A. Clippers' 2006 first-round draft pick and Don Reid on August 1, 2002, from Orlando in exchange for a 2004 second-round draft pick. Previously, Orlando acquired a first-round draft pick on June 28, 2006, from the L.A. Clippers in exchange for Corey Maggette, Derek Strong, the draft rights to Keyon Dooling, a 2000 second-round draft pick and cash considerations. New Jersey used the 22nd pick to draft Marcus Williams.
- ^{t} On July 14, 2004, the L.A. Lakers acquired a 2006 first-round draft pick, Lamar Odom, Caron Butler and Brian Grant from Miami in exchange for Shaquille O'Neal. The L.A. Lakers used the 26th pick to draft Jordan Farmar.
- ^{u} On February 25, 2005, New York acquired Phoenix's 2005 and San Antonio's 2006 first-round draft picks and Malik Rose from San Antonio in exchange for Nazr Mohammed and Jamison Brewer. New York used the 29th pick to draft Mardy Collins.
- ^{v} On June 28, 2005, Portland acquired Detroit's 2006 first-round draft pick, the 6th and 27th pick in 2005 from Utah in exchange for the 3rd pick in 2005. Previously, Utah acquired a 2006 first-round draft pick and Elden Campbell on January 21, 2005, from Detroit in exchange for Carlos Arroyo. Portland used the 30th pick to draft Joel Freeland.
- ^{w} On February 24, 2005, Houston acquired a 2006 second-round draft pick, Moochie Norris and Vin Baker from New York Knicks in exchange for Maurice Taylor. Houston used the 32nd pick to draft Steve Novak.
- ^{x} On July 14, 2005, the L.A. Clippers acquired 2005 and 2006 second-round draft picks from Charlotte in exchange for Eddie House and Melvin Ely. The L.A. Clippers used the 34th pick to draft Paul Davis.
- ^{y} On January 26, 2006, Minnesota acquired 2006 and 2008 second-round draft picks, Ricky Davis, Marcus Banks, Justin Reed and Mark Blount from Boston in exchange for Wally Szczerbiak, Michael Olowokandi, Dwayne Jones and a future first-round draft pick. Minnesota used the 36th pick to draft Craig Smith.
- ^{z} On February 24, 2005, Milwaukee acquired 2006 and 2007 second-round draft picks and Reece Gaines from Houston in exchange for Mike James and Zendon Hamilton. Milwaukee used the 39th pick to draft David Noel.
- ^{aa} On February 23, 2006, Cleveland acquired a 2006 second-round draft pick and Lee Nailon from Philadelphia in exchange for a conditional 2006 second-round draft pick. The conditional 2006 second-round draft pick was not exercised by Philadelphia. Cleveland used the 42nd pick to draft Daniel Gibson.
- ^{ab} On June 28, 2005, Orlando acquired Milwaukee's 2006 second-round draft pick from Cleveland in exchange for the draft rights to Martynas Andriuškevičius. Previously, Cleveland acquired a 2006 second-round draft pick from Milwaukee in exchange for Jiri Welsch. Orlando used the 44th pick to draft Lior Eliyahu.
- ^{ac} On September 30, 2003, Utah acquired Houston's 2004 first-round draft pick, Chicago's 2005 and 2006 second-round draft picks, Glen Rice and cash considerations from Houston in exchange for John Amaechi and Sacramento's 2004 second-round draft pick. Previously, Houston acquired 2005 and 2006 second-round draft picks on September 28, 2000, from Chicago in exchange for Bryce Drew. Utah used the 46th pick to draft Dee Brown.
- ^{ad} On August 2, 2005, Charlotte acquired a 2006 second-round draft pick from Sacramento in exchange for Jason Hart. Charlotte used the 50th pick to draft Ryan Hollins.
- ^{ae} On June 28, 2005, Seattle acquired 2006 and 2007 second-round draft picks from Memphis in exchange for the draft rights to Lawrence Roberts. Seattle used the 53rd pick to draft Yotam Halperin.
- ^{af} On January 31, 2006, Toronto acquired Miami's 2006 second-round draft pick and New Orleans's 2009 second-round draft pick from New Orleans/Oklahoma City in exchange for Aaron Williams. Previously, New Orleans/Oklahoma City acquired Miami's 2006 second-round draft pick on September 30, 2005, from Boston in exchange for Dan Dickau. Previously, Boston acquired 2006 and 2008 second-round draft picks, Qyntel Woods and the draft rights to Albert Miralles on August 8, 2005, from Miami in a five-team trade with Miami, Memphis, New Orleans/Oklahoma City and Utah. Toronto used the 56th pick to draft Edin Bavčić.
- ^{ag} On January 26, 2006, Minnesota acquired a 2006 second-round draft pick from Phoenix in exchange for Nikoloz Tskitishvili. Minnesota used the 57th pick to draft Loukas Mavrokefalidis.

== Draft lottery ==
The first 14 picks in the draft belonged to teams that had missed the playoffs; the order was determined through a lottery. The lottery would determine the three teams that would obtain the first three picks on the draft. The remaining first-round picks and the second-round picks were assigned to teams in reverse order of their win–loss record in the previous season. On April 20, 2007, the NBA performed a tie-breaker to determine the order of the picks for teams with identical win–loss record.

The 2006 Draft Lottery was held on May 23, 2006, in Secaucus, New Jersey. The Toronto Raptors, who had the fifth-worst record, won the lottery with just 8.8% chance to win. The Chicago Bulls, who acquired the New York Knicks' first-round draft pick from a previous trade, landed the second overall pick. The Portland Trail Blazers who had the best chance to land the top pick fell out of the top three and had to settle with 4th pick. Portland's 4th pick was the lowest possible pick that Portland could obtained through the lottery.

Below were the chances for each team to get specific picks in the 2006 draft lottery, rounded to three decimal places:

^	Denotes the actual lottery results

Team	2005–06 record	Lottery chances	Pick													
Team	2005–06 record	Lottery chances	1st	2nd	3rd	4th	5th	6th	7th	8th	9th	10th	11th	12th	13th	14th
Portland Trail Blazers	21–61	250	.250	.215	.177	.358^	—	—	—	—	—	—	—	—	—	—
New York Knicks	23–59	199	.199	.188^	.171	.319	.124	—	—	—	—	—	—	—	—	—
Charlotte Bobcats	26–56	138	.138	.142	.145^	.238	.290	.045	—	—	—	—	—	—	—	—
Atlanta Hawks	26–56	137	.137	.142	.145	.085	.323^	.156	.013	—	—	—	—	—	—	—
Toronto Raptors	27–55	88	.088^	.096	.106	—	.262	.359	.084	.004	—	—	—	—	—	—
Minnesota Timberwolves	33–49	53	.053	.060	.070	—	—	.440^	.330	.045	.001	—	—	—	—	—
Boston Celtics	33–49	53	.053	.060	.070	—	—	—	.573^	.226	.018	.000	—	—	—	—
Houston Rockets	34–48	23	.023	.027	.032	—	—	—	—	.725^	.184	.009	.000	—	—	—
Golden State Warriors	34–48	22	.022	.026	.031	—	—	—	—	—	.797^	.121	.004	.000	—	—
Seattle SuperSonics	35–47	11	.011	.013	.016	—	—	—	—	—	—	.870^	.089	.002	.000	—
Orlando Magic	36–46	8	.008	.009	.012	—	—	—	—	—	—	—	.908^	.063	.001	.000
New Orleans/Oklahoma City Hornets	38–44	7	.007	.008	.010	—	—	—	—	—	—	—	—	.935^	.039	.000
Philadelphia 76ers	38–44	6	.006	.007	.009	—	—	—	—	—	—	—	—	—	.960^	.018
Utah Jazz	41–41	5	.005	.006	.007	—	—	—	—	—	—	—	—	—	—	.982^

a: New York Knicks' pick was conveyed to the Chicago Bulls.^{[o]}

== Eligibility ==
The new collective bargaining agreement between the NBA and the National Basketball Players Association (NBPA) took into effect starting in this year's draft. Under the new agreement, high school players were not eligible for selection. The new rules stated that high school players must wait one year after their high school class graduates and must be at least 19 years old to be eligible for the draft.

The basic requirements for draft eligibility are:

- All drafted players must be at least 19 years of age during the calendar year of the draft (i.e. born on or before December 31, 1987, for the 2006 draft).
- Any player who is not an "international player", as defined in the Collective Bargaining Agreement (CBA), must be at least one year removed from the graduation of his high school class.

The CBA defines "international players" as players who permanently resided outside the U.S. for three years before the draft, did not complete high school in the U.S., and have never enrolled at a U.S. college or university.

The basic requirement for automatic eligibility for a U.S. player is the completion of his college eligibility. Players who meet the CBA definition of "international players" are automatically eligible if their 22nd birthday falls during or before the calendar year of the draft (i.e., born on or before December 31, 1984, for the 2006 draft).

A player who is not automatically eligible must declare his eligibility for the draft by notifying the NBA offices in writing no later than 60 days before the draft. An early entry candidate is allowed to withdraw his eligibility for the draft by notifying the NBA offices in writing no later than 10 days before the draft. On June 19, 2006, NBA announced that 37 college players and 10 international players had filed as early-entry candidates for the 2006 Draft, while 47 players who had previously declared as early entry candidates had withdrawn from the draft.

=== Early entrants ===
This year would mark the very first year where the NBA would not allow for high school prospects to enter the NBA draft after previously allowing it since 1995.

==== College underclassmen ====
This year would mark a step down from the number of underclassmen expressing their interest in joining the NBA draft. After previously having over 100 players expressing their interest last year, this year only saw 92 total underclassmen from college or overseas play express interest in entering the NBA draft. However 46 of these players would later withdraw their entries into the draft, leaving only 46 total underclassmen from college or overseas areas officially entering the draft this year. The following college basketball players successfully applied for early draft entrance.

- (United States) LaMarcus Aldridge – F, Texas (sophomore)
- (United States) Renaldo Balkman – F, South Carolina (junior)
- (United States) Will Blalock – G, Iowa State (junior)
- (United States) Josh Boone – F, Connecticut (junior)
- (United States) Ronnie Brewer – G, Arkansas (junior)
- (United States) Shannon Brown – G, Michigan State (junior)
- (United States) Derek Burditt – F, Blinn (sophomore)
- (United States) Travis DeGroot – G, Delta State (junior)
- (Puerto Rico) Guillermo Diaz – G, Miami (Florida) (junior)
- (United States) Quincy Douby – G, Rutgers (junior)
- (United States) Michael Efevberha – G, Cal State Northridge (junior)
- (United States) Jordan Farmar – G, UCLA (sophomore)
- (United States) Thomas Gardner – G, Missouri (junior)
- (United States) Rudy Gay – F, Connecticut (sophomore)
- (United States) Daniel Gibson – G, Texas (sophomore)
- (United States) LeShawn Hammett – G, Saint Francis (PA) (junior)
- (United States) Tedric Hill – F, Gulf Coast State (sophomore)
- (United States) Donald Jeffes – G, Roxbury CC (sophomore)
- (United States) Alexander Johnson – F, Florida State (junior)
- (United States) Dave Johnson – F, Clinton JC (sophomore)
- (United States) Mark Konecny – F, Lambuth (junior)
- (United States) Kyle Lowry – G, Villanova (sophomore)
- (United States) Paul Millsap – F, Louisiana Tech (junior)
- (United States) Matt Mitchell – G, Southern–New Orleans (junior)
- (United States) Adam Morrison – F, Gonzaga (junior)
- (United States) Patrick O'Bryant – C, Bradley (sophomore)
- (United States) J. R. Pinnock – G, George Washington (junior)
- (United States) Leon Powe – F, California (sophomore)
- (United States) Rajon Rondo – G, Kentucky (sophomore)
- (United States) Cedric Simmons – F, NC State (sophomore)
- (United States) Marcus Slaughter – F, San Diego State (junior)
- (United States) Curtis Stinson – G, Iowa State (junior)
- (United States) Tyrus Thomas – F, LSU (freshman)
- (United States) P. J. Tucker – F/G, Texas (junior)
- (United States) Darius Washington Jr. – G, Memphis (sophomore)
- (United States) Marcus Williams – G, Connecticut (junior)
- (United States) Shawne Williams – F, Memphis (freshman)

==== International players ====
The following international players successfully applied for early draft entrance.

- Pape-Philippe Amagou – G, Le Mans (France)
- Andrea Bargnani – F, Benetton Treviso (Italy)
- Lior Eliyahu – F, Hapoel Galil Elyon (Israel)
- Damir Markota – F, Cibona Zagreb (Croatia)
- Oleksiy Pecherov – F, BC Kyiv (Ukraine)
- Kosta Perović – C, Partizan Belgrade (Serbia)
- Sergio Rodríguez – G, Adecco Estudiantes (Spain)
- (Senegal) Mouhamed Sene – C, Verviers-Pepinster (Belgium)
- Ejike Ugboaja – F, Union Bank Lagos (Nigeria)

=== Automatically eligible entrants ===
Players who do not meet the criteria for "international" players are automatically eligible if they meet any of the following criteria:

- They have no remaining college eligibility.
- If they graduated from high school in the U.S., but did not enroll in a U.S. college or university, four years have passed since their high school class graduated.
- They have signed a contract with a professional basketball team not in the NBA, anywhere in the world, and have played under the contract.

Players who meet the criteria for "international" players are automatically eligible if they meet any of the following criteria:

- They are at least 22 years old during the calendar year of the draft. In term of dates players born on or before December 31, 1984, are automatically eligible for the 2006 draft.
- They have signed a contract with a professional basketball team not in the NBA within the United States, and have played under that contract.

Other automatically eligible players
Player	Team	Note	Ref.
(Australia) Ian Crosswhite	Sydney Kings (Australia)	Left Oregon in 2005; playing professionally since the 2005–06 season	

== Invited attendees ==
The 2006 NBA draft is considered to be the 28th NBA draft to have utilized what is properly considered the "green room" experience for NBA prospects. The NBA's green room is a staging area where anticipated draftees often sit with their families and representatives, waiting for their names to be called on draft night. Often being positioned either in front of or to the side of the podium (in this case, being positioned somewhere within The Theater at Madison Square Garden), once a player heard his name, he would walk to the podium to shake hands and take promotional photos with the NBA commissioner. From there, the players often conducted interviews with various media outlets while backstage. From there, the players often conducted interviews with various media outlets while backstage. However, once the NBA draft started to air nationally on TV starting with the 1980 NBA draft, the green room evolved from players waiting to hear their name called and then shaking hands with these select players who were often called to the hotel to take promotional pictures with the NBA commissioner a day or two after the draft concluded to having players in real-time waiting to hear their names called up and then shaking hands with David Stern, the NBA's commissioner at the time.

The NBA compiled its list of green room invites through collective voting by the NBA's team presidents and general managers alike, which in this year's case belonged to only what they believed were the top 15 prospects at the time. Despite the lower amount of invites for this year's draft when compared to the previous year's draft, there would still be some notable discrepancies involved with the invitations at hand between the invitation for Marcus Williams potentially going out to Thabo Sefolosha and a missing invitation for Mouhamed Sene to provide a perfect top 16 prospect listing, as well as missing invitations for future All-Stars Rajon Rondo, Kyle Lowry, and arguably Paul Millsap for good measure. With that in mind, the following players were invited to attend this year's draft festivities live and in person.

- (United States) LaMarcus Aldridge – PF/C, Texas
- (United States) Hilton Armstrong – PF/C, Connecticut
- Andrea Bargnani – PF/C, Benetton Treviso (Italy)
- (United States) Ronnie Brewer – SG/SF, Arkansas
- (United States) Rodney Carney – SG/SF, Memphis
- (United States) Randy Foye – PG/SG, Villanova
- (United States) Rudy Gay – SF/PF, Connecticut
- (United States) Adam Morrison – SF/PF, Gonzaga
- (United States) Patrick O'Bryant – C, Bradley
- (United States) JJ Redick – SG, Duke
- (United States) Brandon Roy – SG, Washington
- (United States) / (Bulgaria) Cedric Simmons – PF/C, North Carolina State
- (United States) Tyrus Thomas – PF/C, LSU
- (United States) Marcus Williams – PG, Connecticut
- (United States) Shelden Williams – PF/C, Duke

== See also ==
- List of first overall NBA draft picks
