= Abidjan Ramblers =

- Leagues: African Basketball League
- Founded: 2015
- Dissolved: 2017
- Location: Abidjan, Ivory Coast
- Championships: 1 (2016)

The Abidjan Ramblers were an Ivorian basketball club based in Abidjan. The team was one of the six teams of the African Basketball League (ABL) and won the inaugural title in 2016. Jourdain Allou was named Finals MVP. The team was ceased along with the ABL in 2017.
