= African Basketball League =

Men's basketball league in Africa

Continental Basketball League (CBL)
- Sport: Basketball
- First season: 16 December 2015; 10 years ago
- CEO: Ugo Udezue
- Motto: We Think Africa
- No. of teams: 6
- Continent: FIBA Africa (not recognized)
- Most titles: (Ivory Coast) Abidjan Ramblers (Nigeria) Lagos City Stars (1 title each)
- Website: ablafrica.com cblafrica.net

The Continental Basketball League (CBL), formerly the African Basketball League (ABL), was a men's private professional basketball league in Africa established with the vision of creating opportunities in the sports industry by capturing the rich entertainment culture of Africans to promote sports tourism.

The objectives of the league are to create wealth and employment; develop intra-Africa tourism and integration; and foster internal growth and development. This will be achieved through the development of an ecosystem that will support the creation of viable and valuable basketball franchises.

In May 2016, Abidjan Ramblers defeated Lagos Warriors to become the inaugural winners of the league.

== History ==
The ABL was launched on Wednesday December 16, 2015 at the Lagos Boat Club, Ikoyi Lagos. The official presentation of the league was made at the launch including the unveiling of the participating clubs, the introduction of the management board and the announcement of the league partners. The inaugural season began on Friday March 4, 2016.

The league was intended to run simultaneously with other national leagues in Africa, with the CEO, Ugo Udeze stating that approval was gotten from FIBA Africa before commencement of the league. In March 2016, Nigeria Basketball Federation declared it illegal and expelled two Lagos teams, who previously played in the Nigerian Premier League from returning to the legitimate Nigerian basketball league. FIBA Africa also corroborated the stance by the Nigerian body, explaining that it never gave such approval for the league.

In 2017, the league re-branded to become the Continental Basketball League (CBL), also named the CBL Africa.

== Teams ==
=== 2017 season ===
Team	City, Country	Founded	Joined
(Ivory Coast) Abidjan Raiders	Abidjan, Ivory Coast	2017	
(Nigeria) Eko Kings^{CBL}	Lagos, Nigeria	2017	
(Nigeria) Lagos Warriors	Lagos, Nigeria	1994	2016*
(Nigeria) Lagos City Stars	Lagos, Nigeria	2017	
(Gabon) Libreville Izobé Dragons	Libreville, Gabon	2015	2016*
(Cameroon) Yaoundé Giants	Yaoundé, Cameroon	2017	

^{CBL} Teams that are owned by the Continental Basketball League itself.
* Teams that are founding members of the ABL in 2016.

=== Former teams ===
Team	City, Country	Founded	Joined
(Ivory Coast) Abidjan Ramblers	Abidjan, Ivory Coast	2016*	
(Nigeria) Lagos Islanders	Lagos, Nigeria	1984	2017
(Nigeria) Stallions	Lagos, Nigeria	2000	2016*
(Senegal) Dakar Rapids	Dakar, Senegal	2016*	

== 2016 season ==
In May 2016, the Abidjan Ramblers won the inaugural title after beating Stallions in the finals. Jourdain Allou was named Finals MVP.

== 2017 season ==
The regular season began on May 12 and ended May 28, 2017. The final four was played in Lagos on June 3 and June 4, 2017. On June 4, the Lagos City Stars won the second league title and Jordan Mayes was named MVP.

Regular season

Pos.	Team	W	L	W%
1	Eko Kings	5	0	100.0
2	Abidjan Raiders	4	1	80.0
3	Yaoundé Giants	3	2	60.0
4	Lagos City Stars	2	3	40.0
5	Lagos Warriors	1	4	20.0
6	Libreville Izobé Dragons	0	5	0.0

Final Four

Semifinals
1	(Nigeria) Eko Kings	73
4	(Nigeria) Lagos City Stars	82
2	(Ivory Coast) Abidjan Raiders	72
3	(Cameroon) Yaoundé Giants	65

Finals
4	(Nigeria) Lagos City Stars	73
2	(Ivory Coast) Abidjan Raiders	59
