= Stanley Gumut =

Nigerian basketball player

Personal information
- Born: 21 February 1986 (age 40) Jos, Nigeria
- Listed height: 198 cm (6 ft 6 in)
- Listed weight: 95 kg (209 lb)

Career information
- Playing career: 2005–2014
- Position: Shooting guard / small forward
- Number: 11

Career history
- 2005–2006: Plateau Peeks
- 2006–2007: Al Sadd
- 2007–2008: Al-Nasr Benghazi
- 2008: Al-Hilal Benghazi
- 2011: Union Bank
- 2011–2012: Nigerian Customs
- 2012–2014: Mark Mentors
Medals
Men's basketball
Representing Nigeria
FIBA Africa Championship
Bronze medal – third place	2011 Madagascar	National Team

Stanley Gumut (born 21 February 1986) is a Nigerian professional basketball player. He is a native of Jos, Plateau State. He is a 6 ft. 6 in. (1.98 m) tall 210 lb. (95 kg) shooting guard-small forward.

== Nigerian national team ==
Gumut has played internationally with the senior men's Nigerian national basketball team. He played with Nigeria at the 2007, 2011, and 2013 FIBA Africa Championships.
