= Mohamed Mrsal =

Libyan basketball player (born 1978)

Libya national basketball team

Personal information
- Born: January 1, 1978 (age 48)

Mohamed Issa Mrsal (born 1 January 1978) is a Libyan basketball player who competed as a member of the Libya national basketball team since in the 2000s.

Mrsal was one of the most consistent members of the Libyan team that finished 11th as the host country in the 2009 FIBA Africa Championship. He averaged 15.1 PPG and 34.5 minutes per game over eight games for the Libyans. Mrsal scored 24 points and grabbed seven rebounds to go along with six assists while playing all 40 minutes in helping the Libyans to victory in the 11th place game over Morocco.
