= Gégé Kizubanata =

Democratic Republic of the Congo basketball player

Free agent
- Position: Center

Personal information
- Born: 21 May 1981 (age 45) Kinshasa, Zaire
- Listed height: 2.05 m (6 ft 9 in)

Career information
- Playing career: 2002–present

Career history
- ASA
- Stade Nabeulien
- 2018–2020: ASB Mazembe
- 2021: Espoir Fukash

Gégé Kizubanata (born 12 May 1981) is a Congolese basketball player who last played for Espoir Fukash. He also played for the DR Congo national basketball team in his career.

== Early life ==
In 2002, Kizubanata joined the "Africa 100 Camp" in South Africa (now Basketball Without Borders). From there, he was scouted by Angolan team Atlético Sport Aviação.

Kizubanata has also played for (Angola) and Stade Nabeulien (Tunisia).

== National team career ==
He represented the DR Congo at the 2007 FIBA Africa Championship, where he scored 24 points and grabbed 18 rebounds in 79 minutes over 4 games.

== See also ==
- DR Congo national basketball team
