= Filipe Abraão =

Angolan basketball player (1979–2019)

Personal information
- Born: 31 December 1979 Luanda, Angola
- Died: 9 January 2019 (aged 39)
- Listed height: 194 cm (6.36 ft)
- Listed weight: 88 kg (194 lb)
- Position: Small forward

Career history
- 2002–2008: ASA
- 2009–2013: Primeiro de Agosto
- 2014–2015: Recreativo do Libolo
Medals
Men's basketball
Representing Angola
AfroBasket
Gold medal – first place	2009 Benghazi	National Team
FIBA Africa Clubs Champions Cup
Gold medal – first place	Tunis 2014	Rec do Libolo
Silver medal – second place	Salé 2011	1º de Agosto
Bronze medal – third place	Sousse 2008	ASA

Filipe Abraão (31 December 1979 – 9 January 2019) was an Angolan basketball player. He was a 194 cm (6 ft 4 in) in height and weighs 88 kg (194 lb) and played as a small forward.

Abraão also represented the Angolan senior team for the first time at the FIBA Africa Championship 2009. He saw action in five games off the bench for the Angolans, who won their seventh consecutive FIBA Africa Championship and qualified for the 2010 FIBA World Championship.

He last played for Recreativo do Libolo at the Angolan major basketball league BIC Basket.

Abraão died on 9 January 2019 of an undisclosed disease.
