= Francisco Jordão =

Portuguese basketball player (born 1979)

Francisco José Coragem Jordão (born 30 December 1979 in Lisbon) is a Portuguese basketball player. He measures 2.00 metres and plays as a forward.
