= Adolfo Quimbamba =

Angolan basketball player (born 1982)

Personal information
- Born: December 26, 1982 (age 43) Luanda, Angola
- Listed height: 197 cm (6.46 ft)
- Listed weight: 104 kg (229 lb)
- Position: Small forward
- Number: 12

Career history
- 2002–2009: ASA
- 2009–2011: Primeiro de Agosto
- 2012–2013: ASA
Medals
Men's basketball
Representing Angola
AfroBasket
Gold medal – first place	2009 Benghazi	Angola
FIBA Africa Clubs Champions Cup
Bronze medal – third place	Sousse 2008	ASA

Adolfo Graciano Quimbamba (born 26 December 1982) is a retired Angolan basketball player. At 197 cm (6 ft 5 1/2 in) in height and 104 kg (229 pounds) in weight, he played as a small forward.

Quimbamba represented the Angolan senior team for the first time at the FIBA Africa Championship 2009. He saw action in five games off the bench for the Angolans, who won their seventh consecutive FIBA Africa Championship and qualified for the 2010 FIBA World Championship. He last played for ASA at the Angolan major basketball league BAI Basket in 2013.
