= Alamien Yagoub =

Libyan basketball player (born 1981)

Alamien Mohamed G. Yagoub (born 1 March 1981 in Tripoli) is a Libyan basketball player. He was part of the Libya national basketball team at the FIBA Africa Championship 2009, where he averaged 1.8 points per game over 8 games.
