= Union Bank B.C. =

Nigerian basketball club

Union Bank
- Nickname: Stallion Boys
- Leagues: Division 2
- Founded: 2000; 26 years ago
- History: Gboko Heat; 2000–2002; Union Bank BC; 2002–present
- Location: Lagos, Nigeria
- Ownership: Union Bank of Nigeria

Union Bank Basketball Club is a Nigerian professional basketball club. The club used to compete in the Nigerian Premier League. Founded in 2000 as the Gboko Heat, the team was sponsored by the Union Bank of Nigeria and adopted the bank's name in 2003.

In 2016, the team played entered private league African Basketball League (ABL) under the name Stallions. Because this league was not approved by FIBA, the club was suspended from playing in the Nigerian Premier League. Since that year, the team plays in the Division 2.

== In African competitions ==
FIBA Africa Clubs Champions Cup (3 appearances)

- 2005 – 4th Place
- 2008 – 7th Place
- 2011 – 8th Place
