= Basketball at the 2015 African Games – Men's team rosters =

This article displays the rosters for the participating teams at the 2015 All-Africa Games (men's basketball tournament).

== Angola ==
Angola national basketball team – 2015 African Games – Gold medal roster
Players
Coaches

Pos.	No.	Name	Age – Date of birth	Height	Club	Ctr.
PF	4	Edson Ndoniema	24 – 11 February 1991	1.93 m (6 ft 4 in)	Primeiro de Agosto	(Angola)
PG	5	Francisco Sousa	33 – 30 May 1982	1.84 m (6 ft 0 in)	Primeiro de Agosto	(Angola)
PF	6	Mohamed Cissé	22 – 24 April 1993		Primeiro de Agosto	(Angola)
SF	7	Roberto Fortes	30 – 9 November 1984	1.93 m (6 ft 4 in)	Petro de Luanda	(Angola)
G	8	Hermenegildo Santos	25 – 16 August 1990	1.88 m (6 ft 2 in)	Primeiro de Agosto	(Angola)
PG	9	Gerson Domingos	19 – 16 April 1996		Vila Clotilde	(Angola)
SG	10	Gerson Gonçalves	19 – 29 March 1996	1.91 m (6 ft 3 in)	Petro de Luanda	(Angola)
PF	11	Reggie Moore	34 – 31 March 1981	2.00 m (6 ft 7 in)	Primeiro de Agosto	(Angola)
C	12	André Miguel	–		Primeiro de Agosto	(Angola)
C	13	Jone Pedro	25 – 28 May 1990	2.08 m (6 ft 10 in)	Primeiro de Agosto	(Angola)
SG	14	Egídio Ventura	–		ASA	(Angola)
PF	15	Hermenegildo Mbunga	30 – 4 September 1985		Petro de Luanda	(Angola)

Head coach

- (Angola) Carlos Dinis

Assistant coach

- (Angola) Jacinto Olim

Legend

- (C) Team captain
- Club field describes current club

== Congo ==
Congo national basketball team – 2015 African Games – 6th place roster
Players
Coaches

Pos.	No.	Name	Age – Date of birth	Height	Club	Ctr.
	4	Leo Okemba	31 – 29 July 1984
	6	Emilien Okemba	19 – 3 December 1995
	7	Jean-Felix Moupegnou	32 – 7 October 1982
	8	Romaric Kondzy	34 – 12 December 1980
	9	Bertrand Dibessa	34 – 6 May 1981
	10	Mauriann Koumbou	29 – 29 October 1985
	11	Karl Niamamoukoko	23 – 16 February 1992
	12	Chanel Mbongo	27 – 16 July 1988
	13	Rodel Ongoundou	22 – 3 May 1993
	14	Jacques Missengue	34 – 15 July 1981
	15	Japhie Nguia	23 – 24 March 1992

Head coach

- (France) Alexandre Palfroy

Assistant coach

- (Republic of the Congo) Désiré Nsokela

Legend

- (C) Team captain
- Club field describes current club

== Egypt ==
Egypt national basketball team – 2015 African Games – Silver medal roster
Players
Coaches

Pos.	No.	Name	Age – Date of birth	Height	Club	Ctr.
C	1	Kamal Khalifa	27 – 17 November 1987	2.07 m (6 ft 9 in)	Al-Ittihad Alexandria	(Egypt)
G	4	Ehab Amin	20 – 1 August 1995	1.85 m (6 ft 1 in)	TAMCC Islanders	(United States)
PG	6	Ramy Gunady	33 – 20 December 1981	1.84 m (6 ft 0 in)	Zamalek	(Egypt)
	7	Hatem Behiry	22 – 3 November 1992
	9	Motaz Okasha	25 – 14 February 1990
PG	10	Ahmed Tawfik	27 – 5 November 1987	1.84 m (6 ft 0 in)	Sporting Alexandria	(Egypt)
PF	11	Aly Ahmed	23 – 15 March 1992	2.05 m (6 ft 9 in)	CSB Roadrunners	(United States)
SF	12	Youssef Shousha	22 – 9 June 1993	1.92 m (6 ft 4 in)	Sporting Alexandria	(Egypt)
PF	14	Ramy Abdalla	27 – 6 February 1988	2.05 m (6 ft 9 in)	Al-Ittihad Alexandria	(Egypt)
SG	30	Ahmed Elmaragi	22 – 14 October 1992	1.92 m (6 ft 4 in)	Sporting Alexandria	(Egypt)
	35	Ahmed Mohamed	20 – 24 January 1995
C	55	Omar Oraby	24 – 8 September 1991	2.18 m (7 ft 2 in)	Gezira	(Egypt)

Head coach

- (Egypt) Ahmed Marei

Assistant coach

- (Egypt) Wessam Eldiasty

Legend

- Club – describes last
  club before the tournament
- Age – describes age
  on 20 August 2013

== Gabon ==
Gabon national basketball team – 2015 African Games – 8th place roster
Players
Coaches

Pos.	No.	Name	Age – Date of birth	Height	Club	Ctr.
	4	Christ Ndikuedi	20 – 1 March 1995
SF	5	Rodrigue Atsu	22 – 5 November 1992	1.82 m (6 ft 0 in)	Manga BB	(Gabon)
	6	Samuel Ndong	27 – 20 December 1987
	7	Axe Ossami	21 – 15 March 1994
	8	Elise Divonguy	23 – 24 June 1992		Tama BB	(Gabon)
	9	Mathurin Mitogo	25 – 14 August 1990
SG	10	Lin Ikinda	24 – 4 November 1990	1.92 m (6 ft 4 in)	Manga BB	(Gabon)
SF	11	Marvin Mapaga	22 – 28 February 1993	1.98 m (6 ft 6 in)	Espoir BC	(Gabon)
C	12	Jason Reten	37 – 8 October 1977	2.03 m (6 ft 8 in)	Tali BB	(Gabon)
	13	Emmanuel Djoumessi	–
PF	14	Freddy Obame	29 – 6 April 1986	1.98 m (6 ft 6 in)	AS Estuaire	(Gabon)
C	15	Lionel Fabre	30 – 21 March 1985	1.96 m (6 ft 5 in)	Tali BB	(Gabon)

Head coach

- (Serbia) Miodrag Marjanović

Assistant coach

- (Gabon) Hermann Oganda

Legend

- (C) Team captain
- Club field describes current club

== Ivory Coast ==
Ivory Coast national basketball team – 2015 African Games – 7th place roster
Players
Coaches

Pos.	No.	Name	Age – Date of birth	Height	Club	Ctr.
	4	Alassane Meite	23 – 21 September 1991	1.85 m (6 ft 1 in)	Abidjan Basket Club	(Ivory Coast)
	5	Aristide Otto	21 – 3 March 1994
	6	Kevin Oka	29 – 28 September 1985
PG	7	Cédric Kouadio	29 – 24 July 1986	1.81 m (5 ft 11 in)	MATA	(Ivory Coast)
	8	Cyril Adjei	19 – 22 October 1995
	9	Aboubakar Traore	19 – 20 December 1995
	10	Kouame Abo	29 – 26 October 1985
	11	Karamoko Traore	30 – 25 June 1985
	12	Asshe Kokoun	29 – 28 December 1985
	13	Gomon Agole	31 – 26 February 1984
	14	Seguy Kraka	30 – 29 July 1985
	15	Kehasson Oulai	33 – 16 February 1982

Head coach

- (Ivory Coast) Olivier Téa

Assistant coach

- (Ivory Coast) Bamory Coulibaly

Legend

- (C) Team captain
- Club field describes current club

== Mali ==
Mali national basketball team – 2015 African Games – 4th place roster
Players
Coaches

Pos.	No.	Name	Age – Date of birth	Height	Club	Ctr.
	4	Makan Coulibaly	19 – 4 September 1996
PG	5	Mahamadou Kante	23 – 2 March 1992	1.90 m (6 ft 3 in)	CRB Dar El Beida	(Algeria)
PG	6	Abdrahamane Maïga	25 – 11 January 1990	1.74 m (5 ft 9 in)	Stade Malien	(Mali)
SF	7	Ibrahim Djambo	23 – 14 July 1992	2.06 m (6 ft 9 in)	Hofstra Pride	(United States)
	8	Ba Diallo	29 – 29 August 1986
	9	Mamadou Keita	22 – 1 February 1993		Culoz BC
C	10	Mohamed Bah	22 – 22 August 1993	2.05 m (6 ft 9 in)	Drexel Dragons	(United States)
	11	Amadou Sangare	22 – 6 May 1993
	12	Mohamed Pare	18 – 1 November 1996
	13	Bourama Doumbia	19 – 19 September 1995
C	14	Mohamed Tangara	31 – 11 August 1984	2.09 m (6 ft 10 in)	NBA League BF	(United States)
	15	Issa Diawara	21 – 31 December 1993

Head coach

- (Mali) Amidou Traoré

Assistant coach

- (Mali) Amara Traoré

Legend

- (C) Team captain
- Club field describes current club

== Mozambique ==
Mozambique national basketball team – 2015 African Games – 5th place roster
Players
Coaches

Pos.	No.	Name	Age – Date of birth	Height	Club	Ctr.
SF	4	Fernando Mandlate	30 – 11 August 1985	1.92 m (6 ft 4 in)	Ferroviário da Beira	(Mozambique)
C	5	Armando Baptista	30 – 2 June 1985	2.00 m (6 ft 7 in)	Ferroviário da Beira	(Mozambique)
F	6	David Canivete	26 – 9 August 1989	1.93 m (6 ft 4 in)	Desportivo de Maputo	(Mozambique)
	7	Aurélio Chiziane	23 – 12 August 1992		Costa do Sol
F	8	Augusto Matos	24 – 29 November 1990	1.85 m (6 ft 1 in)	Desportivo de Maputo	(Mozambique)
C	9	Edson Monjane	26 – 2 February 1989	2.00 m (6 ft 7 in)	Ferroviário de Maputo	(Mozambique)
F	10	Hugo Martins	20 – 12 March 1995	1.91 m (6 ft 3 in)	Maxaquene	(Mozambique)
C	11	Custódio Muchate	33 – 6 May 1982	1.99 m (6 ft 6 in)	Ferroviário de Maputo	(Mozambique)
C	12	Octávio Magoliço	30 – 4 October 1984	1.99 m (6 ft 6 in)	Ferroviário de Maputo	(Mozambique)
PG	13	Pio Matos	24 – 29 November 1990	1.85 m (6 ft 1 in)	Desportivo de Maputo	(Mozambique)
PG	14	Samora Mucavel	29 – 9 September 1986	1.83 m (6 ft 0 in)	Ferroviário de Maputo	(Mozambique)
G	15	Baggio Chimonzo	24 – 13 December 1990	1.78 m (5 ft 10 in)	Costa do Sol	(Mozambique)

Head coach

- (Spain) Iñaki Garcia

Assistant coach

- (Mozambique) Horácio Martins
- (Mozambique) César Mujui

Legend

- (C) Team captain
- Club field describes current club

== Nigeria ==
Nigeria national basketball team – 2015 African Games – Bronze medal roster
Players
Coaches

Pos.	No.	Name	Age – Date of birth	Height	Club	Ctr.
	4	Moses Daudu	27 – 13 January 1988		Mark Mentors	(Nigeria)
PG	5	Azuoma Dike	25 – 7 December 1989	1.88 m (6 ft 2 in)	Dodan Warriors	(Nigeria)
SG	6	Ibrahim Yusuf	26 – 4 May 1989	1.96 m (6 ft 5 in)	Kano Pillars	(Nigeria)
G	7	Abubakar Usman	29 – 5 July 1986	1.90 m (6 ft 3 in)	Kano Pillars	(Nigeria)
	8	Mathew Onmonya	29 – 29 July 1986	1.98 m (6 ft 6 in)
	9	Victor Koko	22 – 14 December 1992		Mark Menthors	(Nigeria)
SG	10	Jayson Obazuaye	31 – 27 July 1984	1.90 m (6 ft 3 in)		(Nigeria)
	11	Abdul Yahaya	25 – 24 April 1990	2.06 m (6 ft 9 in)	Mark Menthors	(Nigeria)
	12	Olalekan Ajayi	23 – 5 May 1992		Eastern Michigan Eagles	(United States)
SF	13	Stanley Gumut	29 – 21 February 1986	1.98 m (6 ft 6 in)	Mark Menthors	(Nigeria)
	14	Cyril Awere	30 – 2 January 1985
C	15	Olumide Oyedeji	34 – 11 May 1981	2.07 m (6 ft 9 in)	Tochigi Brex	(Japan)

Head coach

- (Nigeria) Sani Ahmed

Assistant coach

- (Nigeria) Lateef Erinfolami

Legend

- (C) Team captain
- Club field describes current club

== Seychelles ==
Seychelles national basketball team – 2015 African Games – 9th place roster
Players
Coaches

Pos.	No.	Name	Age – Date of birth	Height	Club	Ctr.
	4	Keiven Morel	25 – 2 June 1990
	5	Steven Andre	24 – 11 October 1990
	6	Arnaud Arissol	22 – 25 February 1993
	7	Andrew Rath	29 – 23 July 1986
	8	Nigel Sinon	34 – 18 January 1981
	9	Dave Roseline	35 – 8 March 1980
	10	Bernard Bristol	38 – 17 August 1977
	11	Faisel Naiken	28 – 11 May 1987
	12	Timmy Adam	28 – 6 March 1987
	13	Daniel Horaeau	30 – 26 October 1984
	14	Amadou Sylla	29 – 2 September 1986
	15	Robert Lenon	34 – 30 June 1981

Head coach

- (Seychelles) Dominique Gueret

Assistant coach

- (Seychelles) Juliette Tony

Legend

- (C) Team captain
- Club field describes current club

== See also ==
- AfroBasket 2015 squads
