= Basketball at the 2015 African Games – Men's tournament =

Basketball at the 2015 African Games men's tournament
Tournament details
- Host country: Republic of the Congo
- Dates: September 9 – 18, 2015
- Teams: 12 (from 12 federations)
- Venue: 1 (in Brazzaville host cities)

Final positions
- Champions: Angola (4th title)

Official website
- African Games: Tournament for Men 2015

The 2015 edition of the men's basketball tournament of the African Games was the 11th, organized by FIBA Africa and played under the auspices of FIBA, the basketball sport governing body. The tournament was held from 10 to 18 September 2015 at the Gymnase Makélékélé in Brazzaville, Republic of Congo, contested by 9 national teams and won by Angola.

== Format ==
- The 9 teams were divided into two groups (Groups A+B) for the preliminary round.
- Round robin for the preliminary round; the top two teams of each group advanced to the quarterfinals.
- From there on a knockout system was used until the final.

== Draw ==
Group A	Group B
Angola; Congo; Egypt; Gabon; Seychelles	Ivory Coast; Mali; Mozambique; Nigeria

== Group stage ==
Times given below are in UTC+1.

=== Group A ===
Qualified for the quarter-finals

Team	Pld	W	L	PF	PA	PD	Pts
Angola	4	4	0	352	224	+128	8
Egypt	4	3	1	331	241	+90	7
Congo	4	2	2	254	258	-4	6
Gabon	4	1	3	245	340	−95	5
Seychelles	4	0	4	192	311	-119	4

9 September 2015
18:00

Boxscore

Seychelles	43–69	Congo
Scoring by quarter: 5-15, 11-20, 15-14, 12-20
Pts: Rath 14; Rebs: Sinon 4 Asts: Sinon 1		Pts: Dibessa 14; Rebs: Moupegnou 4 Asts: Dibessa, Okemba 1

Gymnase Makélékélé, Brazzaville
Referees: Abreu Muhimua (MOZ), Didier Gaga (RWA), Sassi Camara (MLI)

20:30

Boxscore

Egypt	63–74	Angola
Scoring by quarter: 11-25, 14-19, 13-14, 25-16
Pts: Oraby 16; Rebs: Oraby, Alim 4 Asts: Gunady 2		Pts: Moore 22; Rebs: three players 3 Asts: three players 1

Gymnase Makélékélé, Brazzaville
Referees: Banza Tonton (COD), Muwezhi Munatamba (ZAM), Sammy Wakaba (KEN)

10 September 2015
14:00

Boxscore

Seychelles	48–78	Egypt
Scoring by quarter: 20-21, 5-14
Pts: Rath 22; Rebs: Sinon 6 Asts: Bristol 2		Pts: Alim 15; Rebs: Oraby 6 Asts: Gunady 6

Gymnase Makélékélé, Brazzaville
Referees: Banza Tonton (COD), Guy Sani (CMR), Sandra Essia (GAB)

21:00

Boxscore

Angola	104–49	Gabon
Scoring by quarter: 26-16, 31-9, 27-12, 20-12
Pts: G.Gonçalves 18; Rebs: Moore 6 Asts: G.Gonçalves, Moore 4		Pts: Ikinda 10; Rebs: Ikinda 4 Asts: Onanga 3

Gymnase Makélékélé, Brazzaville
Referees: Youssouf Maiga (MLI), Renato Bindy (CAF), Annie Muchenu (ZIM)

11 September 2015
16:00

Boxscore

Gabon	71–54	Seychelles
Scoring by quarter: 13-6, 16-8, 15-20, 27-20
Pts: Lyvann Obame Obame 22; Rebs: Mapaga 6 Asts: Atsu, Ossami 2		Pts: Rath 15; Rebs: Naiken 7 Asts: Bristol 4

Gymnase Makélékélé, Brazzaville
Referees: Sélio Chiau (MOZ), Olayinka Famogbiyele (NGR), Armand Okoua (CGO)

18:00

Boxscore

Egypt	75–53	Congo
Scoring by quarter: 22-16, 15-10, 26-10, 12-17
Pts: Shousha 24; Rebs: five players 4 Asts: Amin, A.Alim 3		Pts: Missengue 10; Rebs: Moupegnou 6 Asts: Moupegnou 4

Gymnase Makélékélé, Brazzaville
Referees: Ambrose Mbalu (KEN), Youssouf Maiga (MLI), Clésio Ramos (ANG)

12 September 2015
14:00

Boxscore

Angola	93–47	Seychelles
Scoring by quarter: 32-11, 16-18, 34-11, 11-7
Pts: G.Domingos 22; Rebs: Moore 11; Asts: Fortes 5		Pts: Rath 22; Rebs: four players 3 Asts: Arissol 2

Gymnase Makélékélé, Brazzaville
Referees: Youssouf Maiga (MLI), Armand Okoua (CGO), Hesham Metwaly (EGY)

18:00

Boxscore

Gabon	59–67	Congo
Scoring by quarter: 17-11, 12-7, 13-19, 17-30
Pts: Ikinda 18; Rebs: Reteno 6 Asts: Ndikuedi 2		Pts: Moupegnou 16; Rebs: Kondzy 14; Asts: Ongoundou 3

Gymnase Makélékélé, Brazzaville
Referees: Sélio Chiau (MOZ), Clésio Ramos (ANG), Muwezhi Munatamba (ZAM)

14 September 2015
16:00

Boxscore

Congo	65–81	Angola
Scoring by quarter: 22-23, 6-29, 18-13, 19-16
Pts: Dibessa 14; Rebs: Ongoundou 5 Asts: Moupegnou 2		Pts: Fortes 17; Rebs: A.Miguel 8 Asts: G.Gonçalves 3

Gymnase Makélékélé, Brazzaville
Referees: Muwezhi Munatamba (ZAM), Ambrose Mbalu (KEN), Hassan Kamate (CIV)

20:00

Boxscore

Egypt	115–66	Gabon
Scoring by quarter: 26-26, 24-8, 35-14, 20-18
Pts: Shousha 16; Rebs: three players 5 Asts: Khalifa 6		Pts: Ikinda 19; Rebs: Mapaga 9 Asts: four players 1

Gymnase Makélékélé, Brazzaville
Referees: Banza Tonton (COD), Didier Gaga (RWA), Clésio Ramos (ANG)

=== Group B ===
Qualified for the quarter-finals

Team	Pld	W	L	PF	PA	PD	Pts
Nigeria	3	3	0	219	117	+4	6
Mali	3	2	1	178	181	-3	5
Mozambique	3	1	2	169	194	-25	4
Ivory Coast	3	0	3	170	184	-14	3

11 September 2015
10:00

Boxscore

Nigeria	76–59	Mali
Scoring by quarter: 20-17, 20-11, 18-23, 18-8
Pts: Usman 21; Rebs: Onmonya 8 Asts: Usman 3		Pts: Tangara 12; Rebs: Tangara 10; Asts: three players 2

Gymnase Makélékélé, Brazzaville
Referees: Renato Bindy (CAF), Domingos Manuel (ANG), Bob Ossouala (CGO)

12:00

Boxscore

Mozambique	64–62	Ivory Coast
Scoring by quarter: 12-12, 19-19, 15-22, 18-9
Pts: A.Matos 22; Rebs: Muchate 10; Asts: Magoliço 2		Pts: Traore 18; Rebs: Oulai 16; Asts: Meite 4

Gymnase Makélékélé, Brazzaville
Referees: Banza Tonton (COD), Paterne N'Ziengui (GAB)

12 September 2015
10:00

Boxscore

Ivory Coast	57–60	Mali
Scoring by quarter: 16-21, 12-10, 10-14, 19-15
Pts: Meite 18; Rebs: Meite, Kokoun 5 Asts: Meite 3		Pts: Djambo 15; Rebs: Djambo, Tangara 8 Asts: Maiga

Gymnase Makélékélé, Brazzaville
Referees: Sammy Wakaba (KEN), Banza Tonton (COD), Guy Sani (CMR)

September 2015
20:00

Boxscore

Nigeria	81–64	Mozambique
Scoring by quarter: 17-12, 16-20, 29-18, 19-14
Pts: Usman 28; Rebs: Oyedeji 5 Asts: Gumut 4		Pts: P.Matos 19; Rebs: Muchate 8 Asts: Muchate 3

Gymnase Makélékélé, Brazzaville
Referees: Hamid Kaddour (ALG), Didier Gaga (RWA), Hassan Kamate (CIV)

13 September 2015
16:00

Boxscore

Ivory Coast	51–60	Nigeria
Scoring by quarter: 16-11, 12-11, 8-21, 15-17
Pts: Oulai 22; Rebs: Oulai 10; Asts: Oulai, Meite 2		Pts: Oyedeji, Usman 13; Rebs: Oyedeji 11; Asts: Oyedeji, Usman 1

Gymnase Makélékélé, Brazzaville
Referees: Abreu Muhimua (MOZ), Domingos Manuel (ANG), Muwezhi Munatamba (ZAM)

20:00

Boxscore

Mali	54–43	Mozambique
Scoring by quarter: 15-20, 12-4, 15-10, 12-9
Pts: Djambo 15; Rebs: Djambo 14; Asts: Maiga 2		Pts: P.Matos, Canivete 10; Rebs: Magoliço 10; Asts: P.Matos, Mandjate 1

Gymnase Makélékélé, Brazzaville
Referees: Sammy Wakaba (KEN), Paterne N'Ziengui (GAB), Bob Ossouala (CGO)

== Knockout stage ==
All matches were played at the: Gymnase Makélékélé, in Brazzaville

=== 7th place match ===
15 September 2015
12:00

Boxscore

Gabon	51–70	Ivory Coast
Scoring by quarter: 21-11, 12-29, 6-13, 12-17
Pts: Divonguy 14; Rebs: Obame 7 Asts: Ndong 2		Pts: Meite, Oka 14; Rebs: Kokoun 8 Asts: Meite 8

Gymnase Makélékélé, Brazzaville
Referees: Sammy Wakaba (KEN), Hesham Metwaly (EGY), Armand Okoua (CGO)

=== 5th place match ===
16 September 2015
12:00

Boxscore

Congo	69–79	Mozambique
Scoring by quarter: 21-12, 14-20, 14-22, 20-25
Pts: Missengue 17; Rebs: Okemba 6 Asts: Missengue 5		Pts: A.Matos 17; Rebs: Monjane 7 Asts: P.Matos 6

Gymnase Makélékélé, Brazzaville
Referees: Clésio Ramos (ANG), Hesham Metwaly (EGY), Olayinka Famogbiyele (NGR)

Semi-finals
15 September 2015 - 18:00
Angola	76
Mali	62
15 September 2015 - 20:00
Nigeria	60
Egypt	61

Final
18 September 2015 - 19:00
Angola	83
Egypt	73
Third place
18 September 2015 - 14:00
Mali	55
Nigeria	57

=== Semi-finals ===
16 September 2015
18:00

Boxscore

Angola	76–62	Mali
Scoring by quarter: 14-22, 16-4, 21-15, 25-21
Pts: Moore 19; Rebs: Jone 9 Asts: Fortes 3		Pts: three players 12; Rebs: Bah 10; Asts: Tangara 3

Gymnase Makélékélé, Brazzaville
Referees: Banza Tonton (COD), Sammy Wakaba (KEN), Paterne N'Ziengui (GAB)

20:00

Boxscore

Nigeria	60–61	Egypt
Scoring by quarter: 9-14, 14-12, 18-14, 19-21
Pts: Usman 16; Rebs: Oyedeji 12; Asts: Onmonya 2		Pts: Tawfik 16; Rebs: Oraby 6 Asts: Shousha 4

Gymnase Makélékélé, Brazzaville
Referees: Abreu Muhimua (MOZ), Muwezhi Munatamba (ZAM), Hassan Kamate (CIV)

=== Bronze medal match ===
18 September 2015
14:00

Boxscore

Mali	55–57	Nigeria
Scoring by quarter: 7-22, 10-8, 22-15, 16-12
Pts: Djambo 19; Rebs: Djambo 8 Asts: Kante, Maiga 3		Pts: Usman 29; Rebs: Oyedeji 9 Asts: Gumut 3

Gymnase Makélékélé, Brazzaville
Referees: Sammy Wakaba (KEN), Muwezhi Munatamba (ZAM), Hesham Metwaly (EGY)

=== Gold medal match ===
18 September 2015
19:00

[ Boxscore]

Angola	83–73	Egypt
Scoring by quarter: 24-8, 15-21, 23-19, 21-25
Pts: Moore 20; Rebs: Ndoniema 13; Asts: Fortes 3		Pts: Gunady 17; Rebs: three players 7 Asts: Okasha 3

Gymnase Makélékélé, Brazzaville
Referees: Abreu Muhimua (MOZ), Banza Tonton (COD), Hassan Kamate (CIV)

== Final standings ==
Rank	Team	Record
Gold medal	Angola	6-0
Silver medal	Egypt	4-2
Bronze medal	Nigeria	4-1
4	Mali	2-3
5	Mozambique	2-2
6	Congo	2-3
7	Ivory Coast	1-3
8	Gabon	1-4
9	Seychelles	0-4

== Awards ==
2015 African Games Men's Basketball winner

Angola
Fourth title

== See also ==
2015 FIBA Africa Championship
