= 2023 LMB season =

14th season of the Liga Moçambicana de Basquetebol

- League: Liga Moçambicana de Basquetebol
- Sport: Basketball
- Duration: 14 December – 20 December 2023
- Number of teams: 8
- Season MVP: Danilo Cumbe (Costa do Sol)
- Top scorer: Baggio Chimonzo (Ferroviário de Maputo)
- Finals champions: Costa do Sol (2nd title)
- Runners-up: Ferroviário de Maputo

Seasons
- ← 2022 2024 →

The 2023 LMB season (also known as the Liga Mozal) was the 14th season of the Liga Moçambicana de Basquetebol, the highest level of men's basketball in Mozambique. The season took place between 14 December to 20 December 2023.

Costa do Sol won its second championship, 21 years after its first championship.

== Teams ==
União Juvenil de Napipine left the league after the 2022 season, while New Vision from Pemba entered the league.

Team	City
A Poltiécnica	Maputo
Costa do Sol	Maputo
Ferroviário da Beira	Beira
Ferroviário de Maputo	Maputo
Ferroviário de Nampula	Nampula
Maxaquene	Maputo
New Vision	Pemba
Sporting de Quelimane	Quelimane

== Regular season ==
The eight teams played each other team once. The top four teams advance to the playoffs, while the bottom four qualified for the classification round.

Pos	Team	Pld	W	L	GF	GA	GD	Pts	Qualification
1	Costa do Sol	7	7	0	529	394	+135	14	Advance to playoffs
2	Ferroviário da Beira	7	6	1	520	352	+168	13	Advance to playoffs
3	Ferroviário de Maputo	7	5	2	488	434	+54	12	Advance to playoffs
4	A Politécnica	7	3	4	369	411	−42	10	Advance to playoffs
5	Sporting de Quelimane	7	3	4	439	495	−56	10	Qualification for classification round for 5th–8th places
6	Maxaquene	7	2	5	458	491	−33	9	Qualification for classification round for 5th–8th places
7	New Vision	7	1	6	467	547	−80	8	Qualification for classification round for 5th–8th places
8	Ferroviário de Nampula	7	1	6	324	402	−78	8	Qualification for classification round for 5th–8th places

Source: LMB on Facebook

== Classification rounds for 5th–8th places ==
First round
5	Sporting de Quelimane	57
8	Ferroviário de Nampula	66
6	Maxaquene	69
7	New Vision	75

5th-6th place game
8	Ferroviário de Nampula	75
7	New Vision	64
7th-8th place game
5	Sporting de Quelimane	60
6	Maxaquene	72

== Playoffs ==
The semi-finals were played in a best-of-three format, while the finals were played in a best-of-five format.

Semifinals
1	Costa do Sol	2
4	A Politécnica	0
2	Ferroviário da Beira	1
3	Ferroviário de Maputo	2

Final
1	Costa do Sol	3
3	Ferroviário de Maputo	2
Third place series
2	Ferroviário da Beira	2
4	A Politécnica	0

== Individual awards ==
After the final gameday, the following individual awards were awarded by the Mozambican Basketball Federation:

- Most Valuable Player: Danilo Cumbe (Costa do Sol)
- Top Scorer: Baggio Chimonzo, 245 points (Ferroviário de Maputo)
- Best Three-point Shooter: Baggio Chimonzo (Ferroviário de Maputo)
