= Helton Ubisse =

Mozambican basketball player

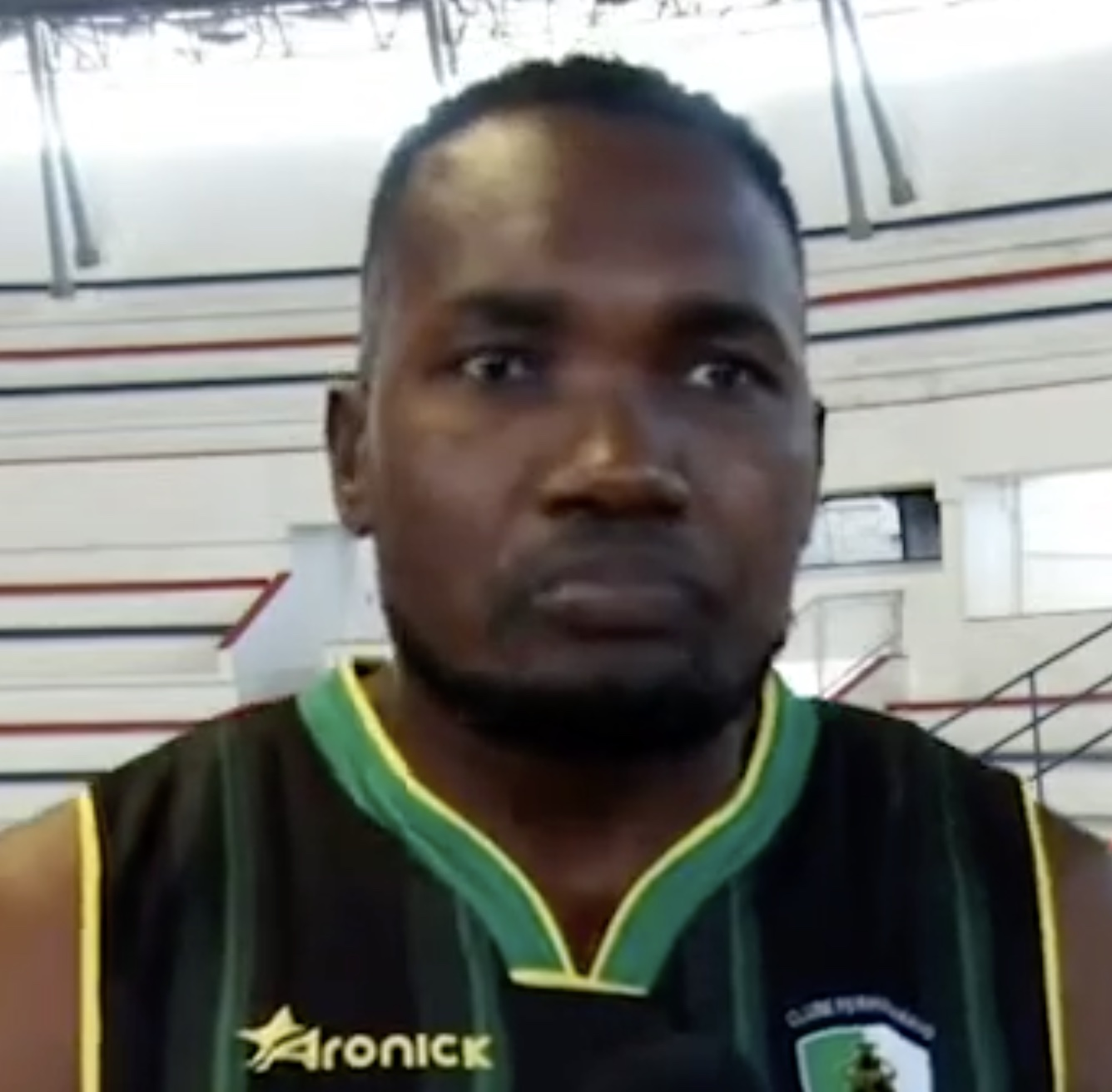
- Ubisse in 2022

No. 13 – Ferroviário da Beira
- Position: Power forward / center
- League: Mozambican Basketball League

Personal information
- Born: 31 January 1995 (age 31) Maputo, Mozambique
- Listed height: 2.01 m (6 ft 7 in)
- Listed weight: 103 kg (227 lb)

Career information
- NBA draft: 2017: undrafted

Career history
- 2016–present: Ferroviário da Beira
- 2019: → Ferroviário de Maputo

Helton Sergio Jacinto Ubisse (born 31 January 1995) is a Mozambican basketball player for Ferroviário da Beira and the Mozambique national basketball team.

== Club career ==
Ubisse has played in his native Mozambique with Ferroviário da Beira. In 2019, he shortly played on loan for Ferroviário de Maputo in the 2021 BAL Qualifying Tournaments. He helped Maputo qualify for the inaugural season of the Basketball Africa League.

== National team career ==
Ubisse has played with the Mozambique national team at AfroBasket tournament in 2015 and 2017. In the 2017 tournament, he averaged 10.7 points per game.

== BAL career statistics ==
Legend
| GP | Games played | GS | Games started | MPG | Minutes per game |
| FG% | Field goal percentage | 3P% | 3-point field goal percentage | FT% | Free throw percentage |
| RPG | Rebounds per game | APG | Assists per game | SPG | Steals per game |
| BPG | Blocks per game | PPG | Points per game | **Bold** | Career high |

| Year | Team | GP | GS | MPG | FG% | 3P% | FT% | RPG | APG | SPG | BPG | PPG |
|---|---|---|---|---|---|---|---|---|---|---|---|---|
| 2022 | Ferroviário da Beira | 5 | 4 | 21.4 | .400 | .000 | .792 | 4.4 | 1.0 | 0.2 | 0.2 | 2.4 |
| Career | | 5 | 4 | 21.4 | .400 | .000 | .792 | 4.4 | 1.0 | 0.2 | 0.2 | 2.4 |
