= Gerson Novela =

Mozambique basketball player

Personal information
- Born: 12 September 1979 (age 47) Maputo, Mozambique
- Listed height: 1.88 m (6 ft 2 in)
- Position: Guard

Career history
- 2006–2012: Ferroviário de Maputo

Gerson Orlando Novela (born 12 September 1979) is a Mozamibcan retired basketball player. He played with Clube Ferroviário de Maputo of the Mozambique Professional Basketball League. He is also a member of the Mozambique national basketball team and appeared with the club at the 2009 African Championships for the first time after previously participating with the team in qualifying for the FIBA Africa Championship 2005.
