= Basketball at the 2015 Summer Universiade – Women's tournament =

Women's basketball at the XXVIII Summer Universiade
- Venue: various
- Dates: July 5, 2015 – July 13, 2015
- Teams: 16

The women's tournament of basketball at the 2015 Summer Universiade in Gwangju began on July 5 and end on July 13.

== Teams ==
| Africa | Americas | Asia | Europe | Oceania |
|---|---|---|---|---|
| Mozambique; Uganda | Brazil; Canada; Mexico; United States | South Korea; China; Chinese Taipei; Japan | Czech; Hungary; Italy; Russia; Sweden | Australia |

== Preliminary round ==
| Qualified for the Final eight |
| Qualified for the Placement 9th–16th |

=== Group A ===
| Team | Pld | W | L | PF | PA | PD | Pts |
|---|---|---|---|---|---|---|---|
| Canada | 3 | 3 | 0 | 229 | 151 | +78 | 6 |
| Hungary | 3 | 2 | 1 | 223 | 169 | +54 | 5 |
| South Korea | 3 | 1 | 2 | 177 | 246 | −69 | 4 |
| Mozambique | 3 | 0 | 3 | 152 | 215 | −63 | 3 |

July 5, 2015
10:00

| Canada | 70–65 (OT) | Hungary |
Scoring by quarter: 12–10, 13–15, 13–9, 14–18, Overtime: 8–8, 10–5

Gwangju University Gymnasium

July 5, 2015
15:00

| South Korea | 80–64 | Mozambique |
Scoring by quarter: 31–18, 20–7, 15–10, 14–29

Gwangju University Gymnasium

July 6, 2015
12:00

| Mozambique | 44–70 | Hungary |
Scoring by quarter: 17–13, 9–12, 12–21, 6–24

Muan Indoor Gymnasium

July 6, 2015
17:30

| Canada | 94–42 | South Korea |
Scoring by quarter: 25–15, 21–9, 28–6, 20–12

Yeonggwang Sportium Gymnasium

July 7, 2015
17:30

| Canada | 65–44 | Mozambique |
Scoring by quarter: 17–13, 10–16, 22–6, 16–9

Gwangju University Gymnasium

July 7, 2015
20:00

| South Korea | 55–88 | Hungary |
Scoring by quarter: 19–22, 16–26, 9–24, 11–16

Dongkang College Gymnasium

=== Group B ===
| Team | Pld | W | L | PF | PA | PD | Pts |
|---|---|---|---|---|---|---|---|
| United States | 3 | 3 | 0 | 262 | 197 | +65 | 6 |
| Czech Republic | 3 | 2 | 1 | 213 | 219 | −6 | 5 |
| Italy | 3 | 1 | 2 | 207 | 194 | +13 | 4 |
| China | 3 | 0 | 3 | 195 | 267 | −72 | 3 |

July 5, 2015
10:00

| United States | 80–68 | Italy |
Scoring by quarter: 20–21, 29–19, 13–14, 18–14

Dongkang College Gymnasium

July 5, 2015
10:00

| Czech Republic | 94–71 | China |
Scoring by quarter: 19–19, 23–17, 29–27, 23–8

Yeonggwang Sportium Gymnasium

July 6, 2015
12:00

| Italy | 56–65 | Czech Republic |
Scoring by quarter: 11–18, 8–17, 24–14, 13–16

Gwangju University Gymnasium

July 6, 2015
17:30

| China | 75–90 | United States |
Scoring by quarter: 23–23, 21–26, 17–19, 14–22

Dongkang College Gymnasium

July 7, 2015
12:00

| United States | 92–54 | Czech Republic |
Scoring by quarter: 30–15, 19–17, 30–14, 13–8

Muan Indoor Gymnasium

July 7, 2015
17:30

| China | 49–83 | Italy |
Scoring by quarter: 10–13, 14–22, 19–17, 6–31

Yeonggwang Sportium Gymnasium

=== Group C ===
| Team | Pld | W | L | PF | PA | PD | Pts |
|---|---|---|---|---|---|---|---|
| Russia | 3 | 3 | 0 | 221 | 156 | +65 | 6 |
| Japan | 3 | 2 | 1 | 204 | 186 | +18 | 5 |
| Sweden | 3 | 1 | 2 | 160 | 201 | −41 | 4 |
| Mexico | 3 | 0 | 3 | 165 | 207 | −42 | 3 |

July 5, 2015
12:30

| Mexico | 46–75 | Russia |
Scoring by quarter: 12–25, 15–13, 13–25, 6–12

Yeonggwang Sportium Gymnasium

July 5, 2015
15:00

| Sweden | 51–71 | Japan |
Scoring by quarter: 14–19, 10–15, 16–21, 11–16

Yeonggwang Sportium Gymnasium

July 6, 2015
14:30

| Japan | 65–71 | Russia |
Scoring by quarter: 18–22, 20–17, 19–20, 8–12

Dongkang College Gymnasium

July 6, 2015
20:00

| Mexico | 55–64 | Sweden |
Scoring by quarter: 17–16, 15–10, 6–18, 17–20

Gwangju University Gymnasium

July 7, 2015
17:30

| Japan | 68–64 | Mexico |
Scoring by quarter: 24–13, 16–15, 12–15, 16–21

Muan Indoor Gymnasium

July 7, 2015
20:00

| Russia | 75–45 | Sweden |
Scoring by quarter: 22–14, 14–9, 19–15, 20–7

Gwangju University Gymnasium

=== Group D ===
| Team | Pld | W | L | PF | PA | PD | Pts |
|---|---|---|---|---|---|---|---|
| Australia | 3 | 3 | 0 | 290 | 133 | +157 | 6 |
| Chinese Taipei | 3 | 2 | 1 | 248 | 213 | +35 | 5 |
| Brazil | 3 | 1 | 2 | 214 | 230 | −16 | 4 |
| Uganda | 3 | 0 | 3 | 145 | 321 | −176 | 3 |

July 5, 2015
18:00

| Australia | 128–31 | Uganda |
Scoring by quarter: 31–9, 27–3, 28–8, 42–11

Yeonggwang Sportium Gymnasium

July 5, 2015
20:30

| Chinese Taipei | 86–81 | Brazil |
Scoring by quarter: 16–24, 27–13, 20–24, 23–20

Yeonggwang Sportium Gymnasium

July 6, 2015
14:30

| Uganda | 55–100 | Chinese Taipei |
Scoring by quarter: 19–27, 13–33, 12–18, 11–22

Muan Indoor Gymnasium

July 6, 2015
17:30

| Brazil | 40–85 | Australia |
Scoring by quarter: 11–19, 7–20, 12–20, 10–26

Gwangju University Gymnasium

July 7, 2015
14:30

| Brazil | 93–59 | Uganda |
Scoring by quarter: 31–12, 18–16, 21–15, 23–16

Yeonggwang Sportium Gymnasium

July 7, 2015
17:30

| Australia | 77–62 | Chinese Taipei |
Scoring by quarter: 24–15, 13–19, 20–8, 20–20

Dongkang College Gymnasium

== Classification round ==
=== Quarter-final round ===
==== 9th–16th place ====
July 9, 2015
10:00

| Italy | 70–37 | Mozambique |
Scoring by quarter: 22–3, 15–6, 18–17, 15–11

Gwangju University Gymnasium

July 9, 2015
10:00

| Mexico | 72–65 | Brazil |
Scoring by quarter: 12–22, 20–13, 22–16, 18–14

Muan Indoor Gymnasium

July 9, 2015
12:30

| Sweden | 85–40 | Uganda |
Scoring by quarter: 29–13, 24–15, 14–4, 18–8

Yeonggwang Sportium Gymnasium

July 9, 2015
15:00

| China | 99–67 | South Korea |
Scoring by quarter: 31–16, 18–14, 23–27, 27–10

Yeonggwang Sportium Gymnasium

=== Semi-final round ===
==== 13th–16th place ====
July 10, 2015
12:00

| South Korea | 77–71 | Uganda |
Scoring by quarter: 13–16, 26–14, 15–17, 23–24

Dongkang College Gymnasium

July 10, 2015
14:30

| Mozambique | 42–87 | Brazil |
Scoring by quarter: 12–20, 10–21, 9–24, 11–22

Dongkang College Gymnasium

==== 9th–12th place ====
July 10, 2015
12:00

| China | 64–74 | Sweden |
Scoring by quarter: 12–13, 13–19, 11–13, 28–29

Gwangju University Gymnasium

July 10, 2015
14:30

| Italy | 79–65 | Mexico |
Scoring by quarter: 25–4, 18–19, 19–12, 17–30

Gwangju University Gymnasium

==== 5th–8th place ====
July 10, 2015
17:30

| Czech Republic | 82–75 | Chinese Taipei |
Scoring by quarter: 16–20, 20–13, 26–10, 20–32

Gwangju University Gymnasium

July 10, 2015
17:30

| Hungary | 58–75 | Australia |
Scoring by quarter: 15–23, 17–10, 11–22, 15–20

Dongkang College Gymnasium

=== Final round ===
==== 15th place game ====
July 12, 2015
10:00

| Uganda | 41–60 | Mozambique |
Scoring by quarter: 6–7, 10–22, 15–20, 10–11

Yeonggwang Sportium Gymnasium

==== 13th place game ====
July 12, 2015
12:30

| South Korea | 58–65 | Brazil |
Scoring by quarter: 8–22, 23–12, 21–20, 6–11

Yeonggwang Sportium Gymnasium

==== 11th place game ====
July 12, 2015
10:00

| China | 79–61 | Mexico |
Scoring by quarter: 22–16, 19–11, 22–10, 16–24

Muan Indoor Gymnasium

==== 9th place game ====
July 12, 2015
12:30

| Sweden | 47–52 | Italy |
Scoring by quarter: 14–16, 8–14, 10–14, 15–8

Muan Indoor Gymnasium

==== 7th place game ====
July 12, 2015
20:30

| Chinese Taipei | 80–56 | Hungary |
Scoring by quarter: 16–16, 17–16, 29–9, 18–15

Gwangju University Gymnasium

==== 5th place game ====
July 12, 2015
10:00

| Czech Republic | 51–56 | Australia |
Scoring by quarter: 16–14, 4–18, 16–18, 15–6

Dongkang College Gymnasium

== Elimination round ==
Quarter-finals
A1 | Canada | 61
B2 | Czech Republic | 53
C1 | Russia | 77
D2 | Chinese Taipei | 68
B1 | United States | 84
A2 | Hungary | 43
D1 | Australia | 71
C2 | Japan | 83

Semi-finals
A1 | Canada | 70
C1 | Russia | 60
B1 | United States | 102
C2 | Japan | 98

Gold Medal Game
A1 | Canada | 63
C2 | United States | 82
Bronze Medal Game
C1 | Russia | 71
B1 | Japan | 60

=== Quarter-finals ===
July 9, 2015
18:00

| Canada | 61–53 | Czech Republic |
Scoring by quarter: 20–20, 13–10, 15–12, 13–11

Yeonggwang Sportium Gymnasium

July 9, 2015
18:00

| Russia | 77–68 | Chinese Taipei |
Scoring by quarter: 19–16, 18–16, 24–17, 16–19

Dongkang College Gymnasium

July 9, 2015
20:30

| United States | 84–43 | Hungary |
Scoring by quarter: 20–15, 19–12, 26–7, 19–9

Dongkang College Gymnasium

July 9, 2015
20:30

| Australia | 71–83 | Japan |
Scoring by quarter: 21–20, 16–15, 20–21, 14–27

Yeonggwang Sportium Gymnasium

=== Semi-finals ===
July 11, 2015
17:30

| Canada | 70–60 | Russia |
Scoring by quarter: 18–9, 21–16, 18–21, 13–14

Dongkang College Gymnasium

July 11, 2015
20:00

| United States | 102–98 (OT) | Japan |
Scoring by quarter: 16–30, 20–13, 21–15, 20–19, Overtime: 9–9, 16–12

Dongkang College Gymnasium

=== Bronze Medal Game ===
July 12, 2015
21:00

| Russia | 71–60 | Japan |
Scoring by quarter: 20–18, 20–9, 16–15, 15–18

Dongkang College Gymnasium

=== Gold Medal Game ===
July 13, 2015
18:00

| Canada | 63–82 | United States |
Scoring by quarter: 11–13, 12–18, 22–17, 18–34

Yeomju Gymnasium

== Final standings ==
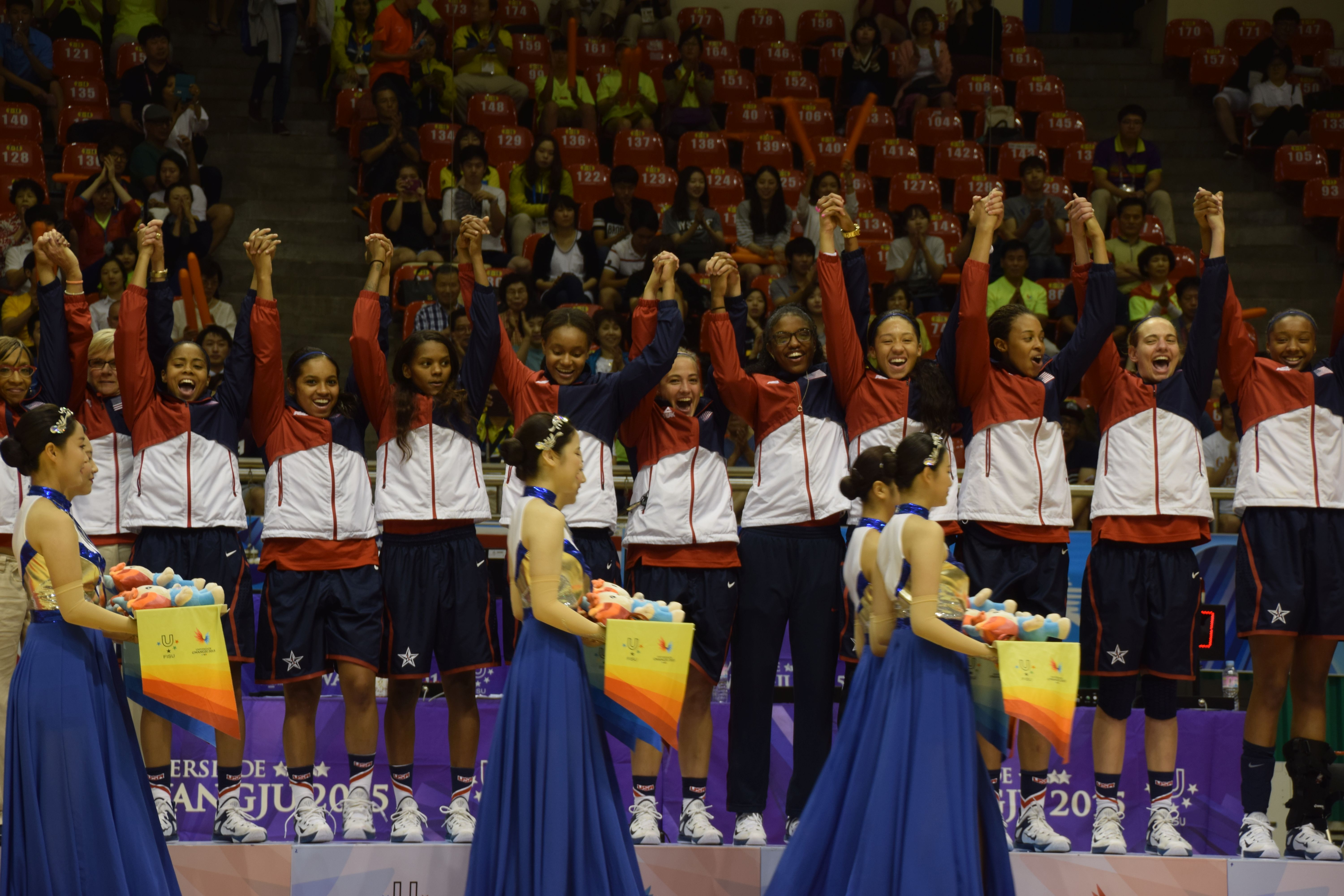
Team accepting gold medal at the 2015 World University Games in South Korea

| Place | Team | Score |
|---|---|---|
| 1st place, gold medalist(s) | United States | |
| 2nd place, silver medalist(s) | Canada | |
| 3rd place, bronze medalist(s) | Russia | |
| 4 | Japan | |
| 5 | Australia | |
| 6 | Czech Republic | |
| 7 | Chinese Taipei | |
| 8 | Hungary | |
| 9 | Italy | |
| 10 | Sweden | |
| 11 | China | |
| 12 | Mexico | |
| 13 | Brazil | |
| 14 | South Korea | |
| 15 | Mozambique | |
| 16 | Uganda | |
