= CD Costa do Sol (basketball) =

Mozambican basketball team

Costa do Sol
- Nickname: Canarinhos
- Leagues: Mozambican Basketball League
- Founded: 15 October 1955; 69 years ago
- History: Sport Lourenço Marques e Benfica (1955–1976); Sport Maputo e Benfica (1976–1978); CD Costa do Sol (1976–present)
- President: Amosse Chicualacuala
- Head coach: Miguel Guambe
- Championships: 2 (2001, 2023)
Home

Clube de Desportos da Costa do Sol, commonly known as CD Costa do Sol, is a Mozambican basketball team from Maputo. It is the basketball section of the multi-sports club, founded in 1955.

The "Canarinhos" (little caranies) won the Liga Moçambicana de Basquetebol (LMB) championship in 2001 and 2023.

== History ==
The team was founded on 15 October 1955 as Sport Lourenço Marques e Benfica, as a subsidiary of the Portuguese sports club S.L. Benfica. Between 1976 and 1978, the team was named Sport Maputo e Benfica after the city was re-named. The team was re-named to CD Costa do Sol in 1978 after Mozambique became independent.

Their 2023 championship was won under coach Miguel Guambe, following a 3–2 finals win over Ferroviáraio de Maputo.

The Costa do Sol women's team were the runners-up in the 2022 FIBA Africa Women's Champions Cup, losing to Alexandria Sporting Club in the finals. They were also qualified for the 2023 season, but withdrew.

== Honours ==
=== Men's team ===
Mozambican Basketball League

- Winners (2): 2001, 2023
  - Runners-up (1): 2019

=== Women's team ===
FIBA Africa Women's Clubs Champions Cup

- Runners-up (1): 2022
