= 2009 FIBA Africa Clubs Champions Cup qualifying rounds =

The qualifying rounds for the 2009 FIBA Africa Clubs Champions Cup were played in a round-robin system, in the various FIBA Africa zones, each zone qualifying two teams for the final round, played in Kigali, Rwanda.

== Zone VI ==
| | Group B | M | W | L | PF | PA | Diff | P |
|---|---|---|---|---|---|---|---|---|
| 1. | (Angola) 1º de Agosto | 6 | 6 | 0 | 642 | 329 | +313 | 12 |
| 2. | (Angola) Petro Atlético | 6 | 5 | 1 | 549 | 325 | +224 | 11 |
| 3. | (Angola) ASA | 6 | 4 | 2 | 478 | 362 | +116 | 10 |
| 4. | (Mozambique) Ferroviário de Maputo | 6 | 3 | 3 | 387 | 481 | -14 | 9 |
| 5. | (Zimbabwe) JBC BC | 6 | 2 | 4 | 352 | 527 | -175 | 8 |
| 6. | (Zimbabwe) Raiders BC | 6 | 1 | 5 | 333 | 472 | -139 | 7 |
| 7. | (Zambia) LCC Looters | 6 | 0 | 6 | 308 | 633 | -325 | 6 |

November 6, 2009

| Raiders BC (Zimbabwe) | 51–58 | (Mozambique) Ferroviário |

November 6, 2009

| 1º de Agosto (Angola) | 91–57 | (Angola) ASA |

November 6, 2009

| JBC BC (Zimbabwe) | 81–67 | (Zambia) LCC Looters |

November 7, 2009

| ASA (Angola) | 111–48 | (Zambia) LCC Looters |

November 7, 2009

| Ferroviário (Mozambique) | 56–83 | (Angola) Petro Atlético |

November 7, 2009

| JBC BC (Zimbabwe) | 73–64 | (Zimbabwe) Raiders BC |

November 8, 2009

| LCC Looters (Zambia) | 38–145 | (Zambia) 1º de Agosto |

November 8, 2009

| Raiders BC (Zimbabwe) | 47–90 | (Angola) ASA |

November 8, 2009

| Petro Atlético (Zimbabwe) | 106–44 | (Zimbabwe) JBC BC |

November 9, 2009

| Raiders BC (Zimbabwe) | 83–59 | (Zambia) LCC Looters |

November 9, 2009

| Ferroviário (Mozambique) | 64–67 | (Angola) ASA |

November 9, 2009

| 1º de Agosto (Angola) | 78–62 | (Angola) Petro Atlético |

November 10, 2009

| Petro Atlético (Zimbabwe) | 91–32 | (Zimbabwe) Raiders BC |

November 10, 2009

| LCC Looters (Zambia) | 46–82 | (Angola) Ferroviário |

November 10, 2009

| JBC BC (Zimbabwe) | 64–127 | (Angola) 1º de Agosto |

November 11, 2009

| Raiders BC (Zimbabwe) | 56–101 | (Angola) 1º de Agosto |

November 11, 2009

| Ferroviário (Mozambique) | 75–54 | (Zimbabwe) JBC BC |

November 11, 2009

| ASA (Angola) | 65–76 | (Angola) Petro Atlético |

November 12, 2009

| Petro Atlético (Angola) | 131–50 | (Zambia) LCC Looters |

November 12, 2009

| 1º de Agosto (Angola) | 100–52 | (Mozambique) Ferroviário |

November 12, 2009

| JBC BC (Zimbabwe) | 36–88 | (Angola) ASA |

== See also ==
- 2009 FIBA Africa Basketball Club Championship squads
