= Milagre Macome =

Mozambican basketball coach

Milagre Macome is a Mozambican basketball coach. He is the current head coach of the Mozambique men's national basketball team, having assumed the position in 2023. He returned to the position while also doing internships with Valencia Basket and S.L. Benfica. He was also the head coach of the team from 2005 to 2007, again from 2013 to 2017, and in 2020. He left the position the latter time due to disappointing results for the national team.

Macome was also the head coach of Ferroviário de Maputo's men's basketball team, winning the Liga Moçambicana de Basquetebol multiple times and having led the team to the quarterfinals of the 2021 BAL Playoffs. He left the position in 2022.
