= Adjehi Baru =

Ivorian basketball player (born 1991)

Free agent
- Position: Power forward

Personal information
- Born: 10 December 1991 (age 34) Abidjan, Ivory Coast
- Listed height: 2.06 m (6 ft 9 in)
- Listed weight: 88 kg (194 lb)

Career information
- High school: The Steward School (Henrico, Virginia)
- College: College of Charleston (2011–2015)
- NBA draft: 2015: undrafted
- Playing career: 2015–present

Career history
- 2015–2016: Xuventude
- 2016–2017: SISU
- 2017–2018: Beroe
- 2018–2019: Coruña
- 2019: Randers Cimbria
- 2020–2021: Randers Cimbria
- 2021: Ferroviário de Maputo
- 2021–2022: Khane Khouzestan
- 2022: Urunani
- 2023: ABC Fighters

Adjehi Nonma Baru (born 10 December 1991) is an Ivorian professional basketball player. He also represents the Ivory Coast national basketball team. He played college basketball for College of Charleston Cougars men's basketball

== College career ==
Baru played college basketball for Charleston Cougars from 2011 to 2015. In his freshman year, he averaged 7.8 points and 6.3 rebounds per game, while in his sophomore year he averaged 9.3 points and 8.3 rebounds per game. In his junior year he averaged 8.97 points per game, 7.5 rebounds per game and 1.4 blocks per game, and in his final season he averaged 7.44 points per game, 0.78 assists and 0.56 blocks.

== Professional career ==
Baru went undrafted in the 2015 NBA draft. In the 2015–16 season, he played for Xuventude Baloncesto of LEB Plata, the third division of the Spanish basketball league. He played for the Danish Basketball league side SISU BKin the 2016–17 season. He then played for the Bulgarian league side BC Beroe in the 2017–18 season. In the 2018–19 season, Baru joined Básquet Coruña, where he averaged 3.1 points and 2.9 rebounds per game.

On 2 March 2020, Baru signed with Ferroviário de Maputo of the Basketball Africa League (BAL). He played with them in the 2021 BAL season in May 2021, and helped the team reach the quarterfinals.

Since 2021, Baru played for Khane Khouzestan in the Iranian Basketball Super League.

In October 2022, Baru was on the roster of Burundian club Urunani for the 2023 BAL qualification games. He had 8 points and 9 rebounds in his debut against ABC.

The following year, in October 2023, Baru played for the ABC Fighters in the 2024 BAL qualification.

== National team career ==
Baru represents the Ivory Coast national basketball team. He participated in the 2019 FIBA Basketball World Cup where he averaged 3 points, 2 rebounds and 1 assist per game.

== BAL career statistics ==
Legend
GP	Games played	GS	Games started	MPG	Minutes per game
FG%	Field goal percentage	3P%	3-point field goal percentage	FT%	Free throw percentage
RPG	Rebounds per game	APG	Assists per game	SPG	Steals per game
BPG	Blocks per game	PPG	Points per game	**Bold**	Career high

Year	Team	GP	GS	MPG	FG%	3P%	FT%	RPG	APG	SPG	BPG	PPG
2021	Ferroviário de Maputo	3	3	32.1	.536	.000	.625	9.7	1.3	2.0	3.0	13.3
Career		3	3	32.1	.536	.000	.625	9.7	1.3	2.0	3.0	13.3
