= Abdel Kader Sylla =

Seselwa basketball player

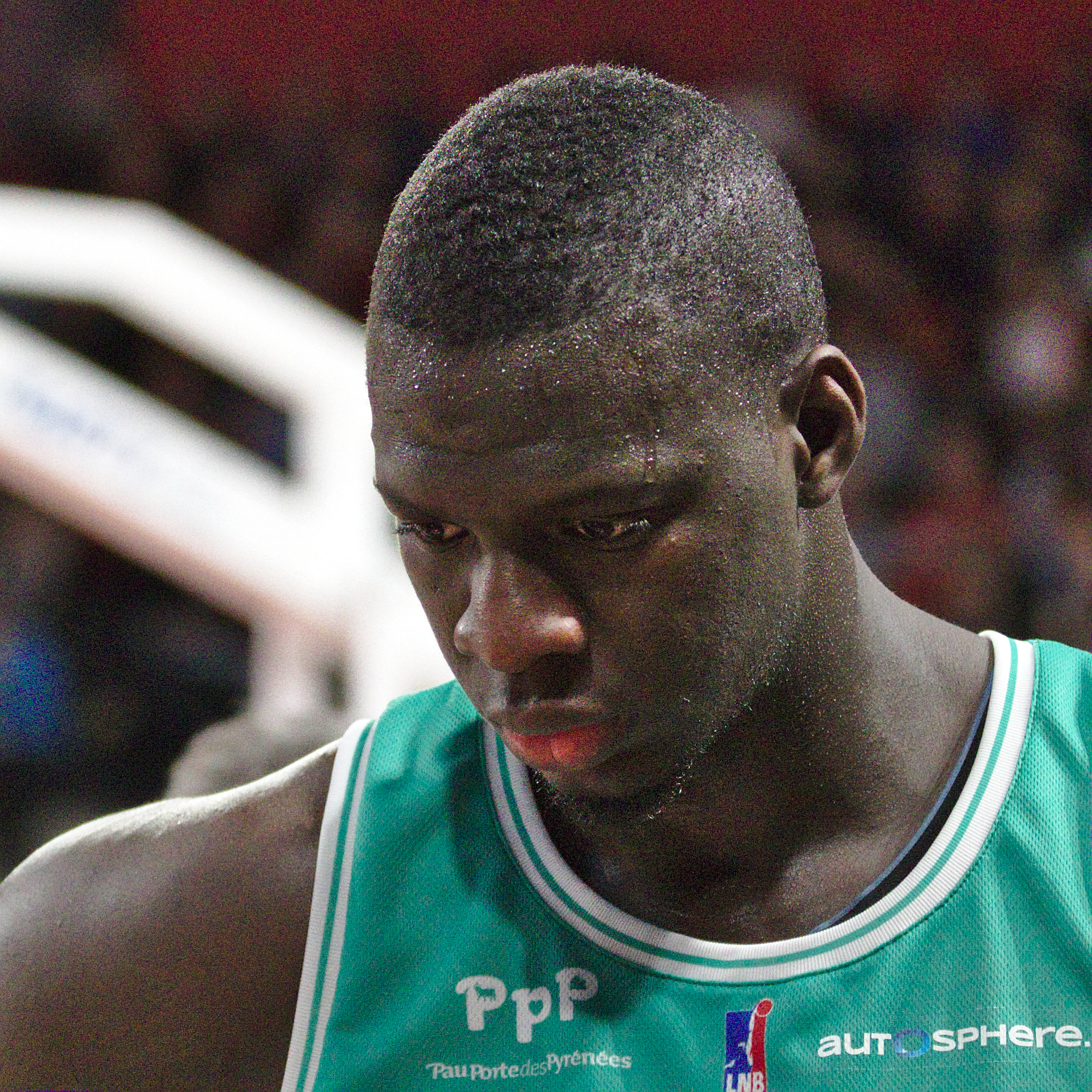
- Sylla with Élan Béarnais in 2015

No. 05 – Vendee Challans Basket
- Position: Center
- League: LNB Pro B

Personal information
- Born: 10 April 1990 (age 36) Victoria, Seychelles
- Listed height: 6 ft 9 in (2.06 m)

Career information
- Playing career: 2009–present

Career history
- 2005–2006: Premium Cobras
- 2006–2007: Baya
- 2007–2013: SLUC Nancy
- 2013–2015: Élan Béarnais Pau-Lacq-Orthez
- 2015–2017: Orléans Loiret
- 2017–2018: AS Monaco
- 2018: JL Bourg
- 2018–2019: Élan Béarnais Pau-Lacq-Orthez
- 2019: Union Neuchâtel
- 2019–2022: Hermine Nantes
- 2022-2025: Tours Metropole Basket
- 2025-present: Vendee Challans Basket

Career highlights
- LNB Pro B Leaders Cup winner (2019); LNB Pro A champion (2011)
Medals
Men's basketball
Representing Seychelles
Indian Ocean Island Games
Gold medal – first place	2011 Victoria

Abdel Kader Sylla (born 10 April 1990), is a Seychellois professional basketball player. He is known as being the first professional player from the Seychelles. He currently plays for Hermine Nantes of the LNB Pro B.

Sylla represented the Seychelles national basketball team on several occasions. In 2022, he was invited to meet President Wavel Ramkalawan.
