= Mozambique men's national basketball team =

Mozambique
- FIBA ranking: 124 (1 September 2026)
- Joined FIBA: 1978
- FIBA zone: FIBA Africa
- National federation: Federação Moçambicana de Basquetebol
- Coach: Milagre Macome

Olympic Games
- Appearances: None

FIBA World Cup
- Appearances: None

AfroBasket
- Appearances: 14
- Medals: None

All Africa Games
- Appearances: 3
- Medals: Silver: (2011)
Home	Away

The Mozambique national basketball team is the basketball team that represents Mozambique in international competitions. It is administered by the Federação Moçambicana de Basquetebol (FMB) (Mozambique Basketball Federation).

Mozambique has qualified for several major international competitions, including the FIBA Africa Championship and the All-Africa Games where they won the Silver Medal at the 2011 event. Altogether it has qualified for the FIBA Africa Championship a total of 14 times, with their best result being the 5th place in 1983.

== Competitive record ==
=== Summer Olympics ===
Yet to qualify

=== World championships ===
Yet to qualify

=== AfroBasket ===
Year	Position	Tournament	Host
1980	–	FIBA Africa Championship 1980	Rabat, Morocco
1981	10	FIBA Africa Championship 1981	Mogadishu, Somalia
1983	5	FIBA Africa Championship 1983	Alexandria, Egypt
1985	9	FIBA Africa Championship 1985	Abidjan, Côte d'Ivoire
1987	–	FIBA Africa Championship 1987	Tunis, Tunisia
1989	–	FIBA Africa Championship 1989	Luanda, Angola
1992	–	FIBA Africa Championship 1992	Cairo, Egypt
1993	–	FIBA Africa Championship 1993	Nairobi, Kenya
1995	8	FIBA Africa Championship 1995	Algiers, Algeria
1997	–	FIBA Africa Championship 1997	Dakar, Senegal
1999	10	FIBA Africa Championship 1999	Angola
2001	10	FIBA Africa Championship 2001	Morocco
2003	10	FIBA Africa Championship 2003	Alexandria, Egypt
2005	11	FIBA Africa Championship 2005	Algiers, Algeria
2007	14	FIBA Africa Championship 2007	Angola
2009	14	FIBA Africa Championship 2009	Libya
2011	10	FIBA Africa Championship 2011	Antananarivo, Madagascar
2013	11	FIBA Africa Championship 2013	Abidjan, Côte d'Ivoire
2015	11	FIBA Africa Championship 2015	Radès, Tunisia
2017	12	AfroBasket 2017	Senegal/Tunisia
2021	–	AfroBasket 2021	Kigali, Rwanda

=== AfroCan ===
- 2023 : 10th

=== African Games ===
- 1991 : ?
- 2011 : 2nd
- 2015 : 5th

=== Lusofonia Games ===
- 2014 : (bronze)

== Current roster ==
Roster for the AfroBasket 2021 qualification matches played on 27, 28 and 29 November 2020 against Angola, Senegal and Kenya.

Mozambique men's national basketball team roster
Players
Coaches

Pos.	No.	Name	Age – Date of birth	Height	Club	Ctr.
SG	0	Ismael Nurmamade	28 – 3 December 1991	1.84 m (6 ft 0 in)	Ferroviário da Beira	(Mozambique)
G	2	Kendal Manuel	23 – 13 September 1997	1.93 m (6 ft 4 in)	Oviedo CB	(Spain)
SF	6	David Canivete	31 – 9 August 1989	1.93 m (6 ft 4 in)	Ferroviário de Maputo	(Mozambique)
F	7	Hugo Martins	25 – 12 March 1995	1.90 m (6 ft 3 in)	Ferroviário de Maputo	(Mozambique)
G	8	Orlando Novela	29 – 20 February 1991	1.83 m (6 ft 0 in)	Ferroviário de Maputo	(Mozambique)
C	9	Helton Ubisse	25 – 31 January 1995	2.01 m (6 ft 7 in)	Ferroviário de Maputo	(Mozambique)
C	11	Custodio Muchate	38 – 6 May 1982	1.99 m (6 ft 6 in)	Ferroviário de Maputo	(Mozambique)
F	12	Inelcio Chire	29 – 1 June 1991	2.01 m (6 ft 7 in)	Ferroviário de Maputo	(Mozambique)
G	13	Pio Matos	29 – 29 November 1990	1.85 m (6 ft 1 in)	Ferroviário de Maputo	(Mozambique)
F/C	20	Octavio Magolico	36 – 4 October 1984	1.99 m (6 ft 6 in)	Ferroviário de Maputo	(Mozambique)
G	21	Milton Caifaz	28 – 16 June 1992	1.98 m (6 ft 6 in)	Ferroviário de Maputo	(Mozambique)
F/C	23	Jeremias Manjate	22 – 10 November 1998	2.03 m (6 ft 8 in)	Sporting CP	(Portugal)

Head coach

- (Mozambique) Milagre Macome

Assistant coach(es)

- (Mozambique) Cesar Atanasio Mujui

Legend

- (C) Team captain
- Club – describes last
  club before the competition
- Age – describes age
  on 27 November 2020

=== Depth chart ===
Pos.	Starting 5	Bench 1	Bench 2
C	Helton Ubisse	Jeremias Manjate
PF	Custódio Muchate	Octávio Magoliço	Inelcio Chire
SF	David Canivete	Hugo Martins
SG	Pio Matos	Ismael Nurmamade	Milton Caifaz
PG	Kendal Manuel	Orlando Novela

== Head coach position ==
- (Mozambique) Milagre Macome - 2005-2007
- (Mozambique) Carlos Alberto Niquice - 2007-2009
- (Portugal) Luís Magalhães - 2009
- (Mozambique) Joseba Martin – 2010–2011
- (Mozambique) Milagre Macome – 2013-2017
- (Mozambique) Joseba Martin – 2017-2018
- (Mozambique) Milagre Macome – 2020–present

== Past rosters ==
Team for the 2013 FIBA Africa Championship.

Mozambique men's national basketball team roster
Players
Coaches

Pos.	No.	Name	Age – Date of birth	Height	Club
F	4	Fernando Mandlate	28 – 11 August 1985	1.90 m (6 ft 3 in)	Maxaquene
G	5	Samora Mucavel	26 – 9 September 1986	1.85 m (6 ft 1 in)	Maxaquene
F	6	David Casnivete	24 – 9 August 1989	1.90 m (6 ft 3 in)	Grupo Desportivo de Maputo
F	7	Sivio Letela	30 – 6 December 1982	1.90 m (6 ft 3 in)	Maxaquene
G	8	Amarildo Matos	28 – 12 March 1985	1.85 m (6 ft 1 in)	Maxaquene
G	9	Ermelindo Novela	22 – 20 February 1991		Clube Ferroviário de Maputo
F	10	Stélio Nuaila	28 – 24 April 1985	1.95 m (6 ft 5 in)	Maxaquene
C	11	Custodio Muchate	31 – 6 May 1982	1.98 m (6 ft 6 in)	Clube Ferroviário de Maputo
F	12	Octavio Magolico	28 – 4 October 1984	2.00 m (6 ft 7 in)	Clube Ferroviário de Maputo
G	13	Augusto Matos	22 – 29 November 1990	1.85 m (6 ft 1 in)	Grupo Desportivo de Maputo
C	14	Armando Baptista	28 – 2 June 1985	2.00 m (6 ft 7 in)	Clube Ferroviário da Beira
C	15	Edson Monjane	24 – 2 February 1989	2.00 m (6 ft 7 in)	Clube Ferroviário de Maputo

Head coach

- Milagre Macome

Legend

- Club – describes last
  club before the tournament
- Age – describes age
  on 20 August 2013

At the AfroBasket 2017:

Mozambique men's national basketball team roster
Players
Coaches

Pos.	No.	Name	Age – Date of birth	Height	Club	Ctr.
G	5	Baggio Lourenço Chimonzo	26 – 13 December 1990	1.79 m (5 ft 10 in)
F	6	David Jordao Canivete	28 – 9 August 1989	1.93 m (6 ft 4 in)
C	9	Helton Sergio Ubisse	22 – 31 January 1995	2.00 m (6 ft 7 in)	Ferroviario Maputo B.C.	(Mozambique)
PF	11	Custodio Anão Muchate	35 – 6 May 1982	1.98 m (6 ft 6 in)	Ferroviario Maputo B.C.	(Mozambique)
PF	12	Octàvio Gregorio Magolico	32 – 4 October 1984	1.98 m (6 ft 6 in)	Ferroviario Beira	(Mozambique)

Head coach

- (Mozambique) Joseba Martin

Assistant coaches

- (Mozambique) Cesar Mujui

Legend

- Club – describes last
  club before the tournament
- Age – describes age
  on 9 September 2017

== Kit ==
=== Manufacturer ===
2020: Lacatoni Sports

=== Sponsor ===
2020: Mitra

== See also ==
- Mozambique women's national basketball team
- Mozambique national under-19 basketball team
- Mozambique national under-17 basketball team
- Mozambique national 3x3 team
