= Seychelles men's national basketball team =

Seychelles
- FIBA ranking: NR (1 September 2026)
- Joined FIBA: 1979
- FIBA zone: FIBA Africa
- National federation: Seychelles Basketball Federation
- Coach: Tony Juliette

Olympic Games
- Appearances: None

FIBA World Cup
- Appearances: None

African Championship
- Appearances: None
Home	Away

The Seychelles national basketball team represents Seychelles in international competitions. It is administered by the Seychelles Basketball Federation.

The Seychelles have competed well at the Indian Ocean Island Games but have yet to qualify for the African Basketball Championship.

== Roster ==
Team for the AfroBasket 2015 qualification.

Seychelles men's national basketball team roster
Players
Coaches

Pos.	No.	Name	Age – Date of birth	Height	Club
		Timmy Michel Adam	28 – 6 March 1987			(Seychelles)
		Cyril Daniel Georges Agrippine	41 – 23 April 1974
		Sergio Julius Ah-Kong	23 – 1 December 1991
		Steven Ronny Andre	24 – 11 October 1990			(Seychelles)
		Damien Arnaud Yannick Arissol	22 – 25 February 1993			(Seychelles)
G		Bernard Richard Bristol	38 – 17 July 1977		PLS Hawks	(Seychelles)
		Ron Daniel France Estico	22 – 27 August 1992			(Seychelles)
		Daniel Dominique Armand Hoareau	30 – 26 October 1984			(Seychelles)
		Giovani Joachim Laval	41 – 26 July 1974			(Seychelles)
		Robert Marshall Leon	34 – 30 June 1981
		Nicolas Henry Monthy	21 – 25 September 1993
		Faisel Jossy Naiken	28 – 11 May 1987
		Andrew Rath	29 – 23 July 1986		Cmb Carrara	(Italy)
		Liston Selwyn Reginald	28 – 9 July 1987			(Seychelles)
		Dave Bradley Guynemer Roseline	35 – 8 March 1980			(Seychelles)
		Simon François Nigel Sinon	34 – 18 January 1981			(Seychelles)
C		Abdel Kader Sylla	25 – 10 April 1990	2.05 m (6 ft 9 in)	Entente Orleans 45	(France)
		Amadou Bahi Sylla	28 – 2 September 1986		Premium Cobras	(Seychelles)

Head coach

- (Seychelles) Tony Juliette

Assistant coach(es)

- (Seychelles) Alix Allisop

Legend

- Club – describes last
  club before the tournament
- Age – describes age
  on 19 August 2015

== Competitions ==
=== Performance at Summer Olympics ===
yet to qualify

=== Performance at World championships ===
yet to qualify

=== Performance at FIBA Africa Championship ===
yet to qualify

=== Performance at African Games ===
- 1987–2011: Did not qualify
- 2015: 9th
- 2019: 5-on-5 basketball did not take place in the 2019 African Games. A 3-on-3 tournament was organized, but a Seychellois team did not participate.
