= Ismael Nurmamade =

Mozambican basketball player

No. 8 – Ferroviário da Beira
- Position: Shooting guard
- League: Mozambican Basketball League

Personal information
- Born: 3 December 1991 (age 34)
- Listed height: 1.85 m (6 ft 1 in)

Career information
- Playing career: 2013–present

Career history
- 2013–present: Ferroviário da Beira

Career highlights
- Mozambican League MVP (2017); Mozambican League champion (2014)

Ismael Sousa Nurmamade (born 3 December 1991) is a Mozambican basketball player for Ferroviário da Beira and the Mozambique national basketball team. Standing at 1.85 m (6 ft 1 in), he plays as shooting guard.

Nurmamade has been a long-time member of Ferroviário da Beira, playing for the team since 2013. He was named the MVP of the Mozambican Basketball League in 2017. He made his debut in the Basketball Africa League (BAL) in the 2022 season.

Nurmamade has played with the Mozambique national team.

== BAL career statistics ==
Legend
GP	Games played	GS	Games started	MPG	Minutes per game
FG%	Field goal percentage	3P%	3-point field goal percentage	FT%	Free throw percentage
RPG	Rebounds per game	APG	Assists per game	SPG	Steals per game
BPG	Blocks per game	PPG	Points per game	**Bold**	Career high

Year	Team	GP	GS	MPG	FG%	3P%	FT%	RPG	APG	SPG	BPG	PPG
2022	Ferroviário da Beira	5	1	20.3	.435	.278	.143	2.0	2.0	1.6	.0	9.2
Career		5	1	20.3	.435	.278	.143	2.0	2.0	1.6	.0	9.2
