= Seychelles Basketball League =

- Organising body: Seychelles Basketball Federation
- Founded: 1993
- First season: 1993
- Country: Seychelles
- Number of teams: 10
- Level on pyramid: 1
- International cup(s): Basketball Africa League (BAL)
- Current champions: Beau Vallon Heat (2022)

The Seychelles Basketball League (SBL) is the premier basketball league for clubs in Seychelles. The league consist out of ten teams (in 2022).

The champions of the SBL are eligible to play in the qualifying rounds of the Basketball Africa League (BAL). The league began in 1993, when club basketball teams were introduced on the Seychelles.

== Current teams ==
The following were the ten teams for the 2019 season:

- Premium Cobras
- Beau Vallon Heat
- Praslin Warriors
- Razors
- RC Dynamics
- Mont Fleuri Dawgz
- BAYA
- Anse Boileau Angels
- PLS Hawks
- MBU Rockers

== Champions ==
- 2001: PLS Hawks
- 2002: PLS Hawks
- 2003: Premium Cobras
- 2004: Premium Cobras
- 2005: PLS Hawks
- 2006: Premium Cobras
- 2007: PLS Hawks
- 2008: unknown
- 2009: PLS Hawks
- 2010: PLS Hawks
- 2011: PLS Hawks
- 2012: PLS Hawks
- 2013: PLS Hawks
- 2014: PLS Hawks
- 2015: unknown
- 2016: Beau Vallon Heat
- 2017: unknown
- 2018: Beau Vallon Heat
- 2019: unknown
- 2020: unknown
- 2021: unknown
- 2022: Beau Vallon Heat

== Finals ==
Season	Champions	Runners-up	Score	Venue
2004	Premium Cobras	PLS Hawks	82-79	Palais des Sports
2006	Premium Cobras	PLS Hawks	69-63	Palais des Sports
2009	PLS Hawks	Baya	104-89	Palais des Sports
2012	PLS Hawks	Baya	92-47	Victoria Gymnasium
2013	PLS Hawks	Beau Vallon Heat	100-60	Victoria Gymnasium
2016	Beau Vallon Heat	Premium Cobras	63-48	Victoria Gymnasium
2017 National Day Tournament	Beau Vallon Heat	Premium Cobras	82-78	Palais des Sports
2017 SBF Cup	Beau Vallon Heat	Baya	83-66	Palais des Sports
2018	Beau Vallon Heat	Premium Cobras	94-85	Palais des Sports
2020 End-of-the-Year Tournament	Beau Vallon Heat	Anse Boileau Drifters	80-67	Victoria Gymnasium
2022 League	Beau Vallon Heat	PLS Hawks	2–1 (series)	
2022 Land Marine Cup	Beau Vallon Heat	PLS Hawks	70–65	Victoria Gymnasium
