= Jeremias Manjate =

Mozambican basketball player

No. 8 – Sporting CP
- Position: Center
- League: Portuguese Basketball League

Personal information
- Born: 10 November 1998 (age 28) Maputo, Mozambique
- Listed height: 2.03 m (6 ft 8 in)
- Listed weight: 85 kg (187 lb)

Career history
- 2017–2019: Belenenses
- 2019–present: Sporting CP

Jeremias Salomão Manjate (born 10 November 1998) is a Mozambican professional basketball player who plays for Sporting CP.
