= Académica Maputo =

Académica
- Full name: Associação Académica de Maputo
- Founded: 1969
- Ground: Maputo, Mozambique
- Manager: Carmona Macobola
- League: Moçambola

Associação Académica de Maputo, usually known as Académica, is a sports club from Maputo, Mozambique. It features teams in football (soccer), Roller hockey (quad) and volleyball.

The club was founded in 1969.
