= Liga Moçambicana de Basquetebol =

Professional basketball league in Mozambique

- Founded: 1960; 66 years ago
- First season: 1960
- Country: Mozambique
- Number of teams: 8
- Level on pyramid: 1
- International cup: Basketball Africa League (BAL)
- Current champions: Ferroviário da Beira (7th title) (2024–25)
- Most championships: Maxaquene (18 titles)
- 2026 LMB season

The Liga Moçambicana de Basquetebol (LMB), known as the Liga Mozal for sponsorship reasons, is the highest basketball league in Mozambique. Founded in 1960, the league typically consists of eight teams. The winners of the competition earn the right to play in the qualifying tournaments of the Basketball Africa League (BAL).

Maxaquene is the most successful team in league history with 18 titles. In recent years, Ferroviário da Beira and Ferroviário de Maputo have dominated the league, with one of these two teams winning all championships between 2011 and 2022.

== Teams ==
=== Current teams ===
The following were the eight teams of the 2022 season:

Team	City
Maxaquene	Maputo
Costa do Sol	Maputo
Ferroviário da Beira	Beira
Ferroviário de Maputo	Maputo
A Politecnica Maputo	Maputo
União Juvenil de Napipine	Napipine
Sporting de Quelimane	Quelimane
Ferroviário de Nampula	Nampula

=== Former teams ===
Team	City	Last season
Clube Municipal da Beira	Maputo	2022
Universidade Pedagocica	Maputo	2022
Sporting da Beira	Beira	
Atlético da Beira	Beira	
Malhangalene de Lourenço Marques	Lourenço Marques (now Maputo)	
Têxtil do Punguè Beira	Beira	
Vaz Team da Beira	Beira	2018
Ferroviário de Nacala	Nacala	2018
Univ. Pedagogica Nampula	Nampula	2015

== Champions ==
The following were the champions, runners-up and third place teams in the Mozambican League history:

Year	Champions	Runners-up	Third place	Ref.
1960	Desportivo de Lourenço Marques	Sporting da Beira	–	
1961	Desportivo de Lourenço Marques (2)	Ferroviário da Beira		
1962	Ferroviário de Lourenço Marques	Atletico da Beira	Sport Luanda e Benfica	
1963	Desportivo de Lourenço Marques (3)			
1964	Desportivo de Lourenço Marques (4)			
1965	Sporting de Lourenço Marques			
1966	Sporting de Lourenço Marques (2)	Ferroviário de Lourenço Marques		
1967	Sporting de Lourenço Marques (3)			
1968	Desportivo de Lourenço Marques (5)			
1969	Desportivo de Lourenço Marques (6)			
1970	Sporting de Lourenço Marques (4)			
1971	Sporting de Lourenço Marques (5)			
1972	Sporting de Lourenço Marques (6)			
1973	Sporting de Lourenço Marques (7)			
1974	Sporting de Lourenço Marques (8)	Malhangalene de Lourenço Marques		
1975	Ferroviário de Lourenço Marques (2)			
1975a	Ferroviário de Lourenço Marques (3)			
1977	Desportivo Maputo (7)	Sporting da Beira	Sporting Maputo	
1978	Desportivo Maputo (8)	Maxaquene	Têxtil do Punguè Beira	
1979	Maxaquene (9)	Desportivo Maputo		
1980	Desportivo Maputo (9)	Maxaquene		
1981	Maxaquene (10)			
1982	Desportivo Maputo (10)			
1983	Maxaquene (11)			
1984	Maxaquene (12)			
1985	Not held			
1986	Maxaquene (13)			
1987	Maxaquene (14)			
1988	Maxaquene (15)			
1989	Maxaquene (16)			
1990	Desportivo Maputo (11)			
1991	Maxaquene (17)			
1992	Maxaquene (18)			
1993	Maxaquene (19)			
1994	Conseng Maputo			
1995	Maxaquene (20)			
1996	Conseng Maputo (2)			
1997	Maxaquene (21)			
1998	Acadamica Maputo			
1999	Maxaquene (22)			
2000	Maxaquene (23)			
2001	Costa do Sol	Academica Maputo	–	
2002	Desportivo Maputo (12)	Academica Maputo	Maxaquene	
2003	Desportivo Maputo (13)	Ferroviário da Beira	Maxaquene	
2004	Maxaquene (24)	Ferroviário de Maputo	Desportivo Maputo	
2005	Ferroviário de Maputo (4)	Maxaquene	Academica Maputo	
2006	Ferroviário de Maputo (5)	Maxaquene	Ferroviário da Beira	
2007	Ferroviário de Maputo (6)	Ferroviário da Beira	Maxaquene	
2008	Ferroviário de Maputo (7)	Maxaquene	Costa do Sol	
2009	Maxaquene (25)	Ferroviário da Beira	Ferroviário de Maputo	
2010	Maxaquene (26)	Desportivo Maputo	–	
2011	Ferroviário de Maputo (8)	Desportivo Maputo	Maxaquene	
2012	Ferroviário da Beira	Maxaquene	–	
2013	Ferroviário da Beira (2)	Ferroviário de Maputo	Desportivo de Maputo	
2014	Ferroviário da Beira (3)	Ferroviário de Maputo	Desportivo de Maputo	
2015	Desportivo de Maputo (14)	Ferroviário de Maputo	Costa do Sol	
2016	Ferroviário de Maputo (8)	Ferroviário da Beira	A Politécnica Maputo	
2017	Ferroviário de Maputo (9)	Ferroviário da Beira	Costa do Sol	
2018	Ferroviário de Maputo (10)	Ferroviário da Beira	A Politécnica Maputo	
2019	Ferroviário de Maputo (11)	Costa do Sol	Ferroviário da Beira	
2020	Not held due to the coronavirus pandemic			
2021	Ferroviário da Beira (4) (Note: In 2021, a tournament was played to determine which team would represent Mozambique in the 2022 BAL qualification games. Ferroviário da Beira defeated Ferroviário de Maputo to claim the country's spot.)	Ferroviário de Maputo	Costa do Sol	
2022	Ferroviário da Beira (5)	Ferroviário de Maputo	Costa do Sol	
2023 (Note: In the 2023 season, there was also a separate qualifying tournament for the Basketball Africa League (BAL) that was organised in October and November. The tournament was won by Ferroviário da Beira, however, Costa do Sol won the 2023 LMB championship.)	Costa do Sol (2)	Ferroviário de Maputo	Ferroviário da Beira	
2024	Ferroviário da Beira (6)	Costa do Sol	Ferroviário da Beira	
2025	Ferroviário da Beira (7)	Costa do Sol	Maxaquene	

=== Performance by club ===
Club	Champions	Runners-up	Third place	Most recent title
**Maxaquene (Note: Including championships when the team was known as Sporting Clube de Lourenço Marques (until 1976).)**	26	6	5	2010
Desportivo Maputo (Note: Including when the team was named Desportivo de Lourenço Marques.)	13	3	3	2003
**Ferroviário de Maputo (Note: Known as Ferroviário de Lourenço Marques.)**	11	6	1	2019
**Ferroviário da Beira**	7	7	2	2025
**Costa do Sol**	2	2	4	2023
Conseng Maputo	2	0	0	1996
Acadamica Maputo	1	2	0	1998
Sporting da Beira	0	2	0	–
Malhangalene	0	1	0	–
Atletico da Beira	0	1	0	–
**A Politécnica Maputo**	0	0	2	–
Sporting de Quelimane	0	0	1	–
Sporting de Maputo	0	0	1	–
Têxtil do Punguè Beira	0	0	1	–

Teams in bold currently play in the LMB.

== Awards ==
At the end of each season, the Mozambican Basketball Federation awards the best performers of a given season.

=== Most Valuable Player ===
- 2015 – Pio Matos, Ferroviário de Maputo
- 2017 – Ismael Nurmamade, Ferroviário da Beira
- 2018 – Álvaro Calvo Masa, Ferroviário de Maputo
- 2019 – Álvaro Calvo Masa, Ferroviário de Maputo
- 2021 – Will Perry, Ferroviário da Beira
- 2022 – Will Perry, Ferroviário da Beira
- 2023 – Danilo Cumbe, Costa do Sol

=== Top scorer ===
- 2022 – Danilo Cumbe, Costa do Sol (147 points)
- 2023 – Baggio Chimonzo, Ferroviário de Maputo (245 points)

== In the Basketball Africa League ==
Season	Representative team	Road to BAL	Qualified	Main competition	Record
2021	Ferroviário de Maputo	Bronze	Yes	Quarter-finalist	1–3
2022	Ferroviário da Beira	Gold	Yes	Group phase	1–4
2023	Ferroviário da Beira	Silver	Yes	Quarter-finalist	2–4
2024	Ferroviário da Beira	Elite 16	No	DNQ	
2025	Costa do Sol	First round	No	DNQ	
2026	Ferroviário da Beira	Elite 16	No	DNQ	
