= Alassane Meite =

French association football player (born 2000)

Personal information
- Date of birth: 9 June 2000 (age 26)
- Place of birth: Courcouronnes, Paris, France
- Position: Forward

Youth career
- –2017: Paris Saint-Germain
- 2017–2019: Leicester City

Senior career*
Years	Team	Apps	(Gls)
2019–2020	Fujairah	1	(0)
- * Club domestic league appearances and goals as of 18:02, 26 October 2019 (UTC)

Alassane Meite (born 9 June 2000) is a French footballer who currently plays as a forward.

== Career statistics ==
=== Club ===
As of 26 October 2019.

Club	Season	League			Cup		Continental		Other		Total	
Club	Season	Division	Apps	Goals	Apps	Goals	Apps	Goals	Apps	Goals	Apps	Goals
Fujairah	2019–20	UAE Pro League	1	0	0	0	0	0	0	0	1	0
Career total			1	0	0	0	0	0	0	0	1	0
