= Killing of Mohamed Bah =

2012 death by firearm incident in New York

- Date: September 25, 2012; 14 years ago
- Location: New York City
- Participants: Police officers; Mohamed Bah
- Outcome: Mohamed Bah dies
- Deaths: Mohamed Bah
- Charges: None filed
- Litigation: Civil lawsuit settled for $2.21 million

On September 25, 2012, Mohamed Bah, a 28-year-old Guinean national, was fatally shot eight times inside his Harlem apartment by New York City police officers.

The incident prompted the Bah family to file a $70 million civil lawsuit against New York City. The lawsuit demanded the city implement changes in the way police deal with people suffering from a mental illness.

In 2017, the Bah family settled in court for $2.21 million. The officers were found to have used unnecessary force, but did not face charges.
