= Roberto Fortes =

Angolan basketball player (born 1984)

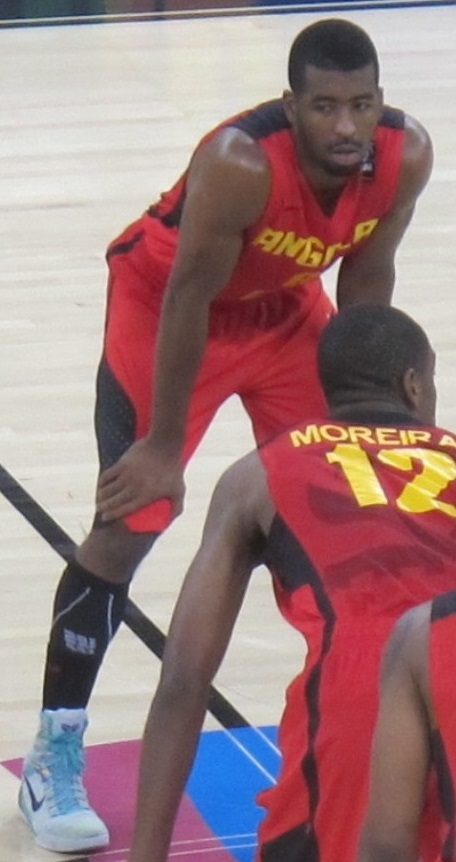
- Forbes in 2014

Personal information
- Born: November 9, 1984 (age 42) Luanda, Angola
- Listed height: 193 cm (6.33 ft)
- Listed weight: 88 kg (194 lb)

Career information
- High school: North Side (Fort Wayne, Indiana)
- College: Daytona State College (2003–2005); Illinois State (2005–2006)
- NBA draft: 2008: undrafted
- Playing career: 2008–2018
- Position: Forward

Career history
- 2008–2012: Petro Atlético
- 2013: Recreativo do Libolo
- 2013–2015: Petro Atlético
- 2016–2018: Benfica do Libolo
Medals
Men's basketball
Representing Angola
AfroBasket
Silver medal – second place	Radès 2015	National Team
African Games
Gold medal – first place	Brazzaville 2015	National Team

Roberto Duete Fortes (born November 9, 1984) is an Angolan former basketball player. Fortes was a member of the Angola national basketball team and formerly the Illinois State Redbirds men's basketball team. He represented Angola at the 2010 FIBA World Championship.

He last played for Recreativo do Libolo at the Angolan major basketball league BIC Basket.

== Personal ==
Fortes moved to the United States with his family at the age of 11, after leaving his native Angola to flee the Civil War. He also attended North Side High School in Fort Wayne, Indiana and Daytona State Community College prior to attending Illinois State.
