= Ahmed Tawfik (basketball) =

Egyptian basketball player

Sporting SC
- Position: Point guard
- League: Egyptian Basketball Super League

Personal information
- Born: November 5, 1987 (age 39)
- Listed height: 6 ft 0 in (1.83 m)

Career history
- 2013-present: Sporting SC (Egypt)

Ahmed Tawfik (Arabic: أحمد توفيق) (born November 5, 1987) is an Egyptian professional basketball player, currently with Sporting SC of the Egyptian Basketball Super League.

He represented Egypt's national basketball team at the AfroBasket 2015 in Radès, Tunisia.
