= Pio Matos =

Mozambican basketball player

Pio Matos Jr.
No. 8 – Ferroviário de Maputo
- Position: Point guard
- League: Mozambican League

Personal information
- Born: 29 November 1990 (age 35) Quelimane, Mozambique
- Listed height: 1.85 m (6 ft 1 in)

Career history
- –2015: Desportivo Maputo
- 2015–present: Ferroviário de Maputo

Career highlights
- 3× Mozambican League champion (2015, 2018, 2019); Mozambican League MVP (2015)

Pio da Silva Matos Júnior (born 29 November 1990) is a Mozambican professional basketball player for Ferroviário de Maputo of the Mozambican Division I Basketball League.

Matos was named league most valuable player (MVP) in 2015 and has won two championships: with Desportivo de Maputo in 2015 and with Ferroviário de Maputo in 2018. He is a regular member of the Mozambican national team and has experience at AfroBasket.

Matos has a twin brother, Augusto, who plays professional basketball in Mozambique and for the national team. Their older brother, Amarildo, also plays basketball at the professional level.
