= C.D. Maxaquene (basketball) =

Maxaquene
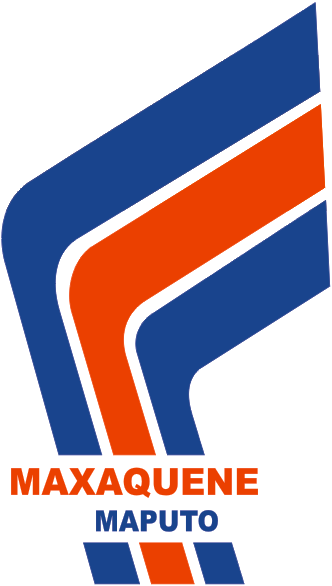
- Leagues: Mozambican Basketball League
- Founded: 20 May 1920; 104 years ago
- Location: Maputo, Mozambique
- Championships: 1 African Championship; 18 Mozambican Leagues
Home

Clube de Desportos do Maxaquene, or C.D. Maxaquene, is a professional basketball club that is based in Maputo, Mozambique. The club competes in the Mozambican League.

== History ==
C.D. Maxaquene won the FIBA Africa Clubs Champions Cup in 1985 and the FIBA Africa Women's Clubs Champions Cup in 1991. They also competed at the 1985 edition of the Intercontinental Cup.

== Honours ==
Mozambican League

- Champions: 2008, 2009

FIBA Africa Clubs Champions Cup

- Champions (1): 1985
