= Clube Ferroviário da Beira (basketball) =

Ferroviário da Beira
- Nickname: CFvB; Locomotivas (Locomotives)
- Leagues: LMB
- Founded: 13 October 1924; 100 years ago
- History: Ferroviário da Beira; 1924–present
- Arena: Estádio do Ferroviário Indoor Hall
- Location: Beira, Mozambique
- Head coach: Luiz Lopez
- Championships: 6 (2012, 2013, 2014, 2021, 2022, 2024)
- Website: ferroviariodabeira.com
Home	Away

Clube Ferroviário da Beira (in English: Railway Club Beira) is a basketball club from Beira, Mozambique. The team plays in the national Mozambican Basketball League (LMB) and has won the national championship six times.

The team played in the Basketball Africa League (BAL) during the 2022 and 2023 seasons. During the 2000s and 2010s, they played in the FIBA Africa Club Champions Cup four editions as well.

== History ==
Founded in 1924, Ferroviário da Beira has played in the Mozambican Basketball League (LMB) for most of its existence. From 2012, the team won three consecutive league championships.

Ferroviário team played in the 2018–19 Africa Basketball League.

In June 2021, the Spanish coach Luis Lopez Hernandez was hired as new head coach, his second stint with the club. In the fall of 2021, they played in the qualifiers of the Basketball Africa League (BAL) for the first time. On December 10, 2021, the team qualified for the 2022 BAL season after defeating Cape Town Tigers in the semi-finals. In its debut season in the BAL, Beira finished in the fifth place in the Sahara Conference with a 1–4 record. On 8 March 2022, the team won its first game in the league after defeating hosts DUC 98–92.

In 2022 and 2023, Beira won its fourth and fifth national championship, behind league MVP Will Perry.

Beira returned to the 2023 BAL season and played in the Nile Conference. On 30 April, Will Perry scored 41 points in Beira's 109–97 win over SLAC, which tied the league record for most points in a single game by a player.

== Honours ==
Liga Moçambicana de Basquetebol

- Winners (6): 2012, 2013, 2014, 2021, 2022, 2024
  - Runners-up (2): 2009, 2016

== Players ==
=== Current roster ===
Note: Flags indicate national team eligibility at FIBA-sanctioned events. Players may hold other non-FIBA nationalities not displayed.

Ferroviário da Beira roster
Players
Coaches

Pos.	No.	Nat.	Name	Ht.	Age
SF	4	(Canada)	Kennedy, Jermel (I)	1.94 m (6 ft 4 in)	35 – 19 September 1989
PF	5	(Mozambique)	Baptista, Armando	2.00 m (6 ft 7 in)	40 – 2 June 1985
SF	6	(Mozambique)	Novela, Orlando	1.85 m (6 ft 1 in)	34 – 20 February 1991
G	8	(Mozambique)	Nurmamade, Ismael	1.85 m (6 ft 1 in)	33 – 3 December 1991
PG	10	(Mozambique)	Novela, Ermelindo	1.85 m (6 ft 1 in)	34 – 20 February 1991
F	11	(Mozambique)	Houana, Elves	1.93 m (6 ft 4 in)	37 – 18 August 1987
PG	12	(United States)	Perry, Will (I)	1.83 m (6 ft 0 in)	31 – 11 October 1993
PF	13	(Mozambique)	Ubisse, Helton	2.01 m (6 ft 7 in)	30 – 31 January 1995
PG	15	(Mozambique)	Senda, Alberto	1.85 m (6 ft 1 in)	27 – 2 January 1998
F	17	(Mozambique)	Munguambe, Ayad	1.97 m (6 ft 6 in)	28 – 29 June 1996
PF	23	(Mozambique)	Zandamela, Egidio	2.03 m (6 ft 8 in)	30 – 13 April 1995
C		(Nigeria)	Orizu, Prince (I)	2.08 m (6 ft 10 in)	30 – 10 August 1994
C		(Mozambique)	Chire, Inélcio	2.00 m (6 ft 7 in)	34 – 1 January 1991

Head coach

- (Spain) Luiz Lopes

Assistant coach(es)

- (Spain) Amarildo Taquidir

Legend

- (C) Team captain
- (I) Import player
- Injured

- Roster
Updated: March 2, 2022

== In African competitions ==
Basketball Africa League (BAL) (1 appearance)

- 2022 – Group Phase

BAL Qualifiers (1 appearance)

- 2021 – Winners of East Division
- 2022 – In progress

FIBA Africa Club Champions Cup (4 appearances)

- 2007 – 12th place
- 2013 – 10th place
- 2017 – 6th place
- 2019 – Group Stage
