= Ferroviário de Maputo (basketball) =

Basketball club in Maputo, Mozambique

- Nickname: Os Locomotivas (The Locomotives)
- Leagues: Mozambican League
- Founded: 1960s
- History: Clube Ferroviário de Lourenço Marques (1924–1976); Clube Ferrioviário de Maputo (1976–present)
- Arena: Pavilhão do Maxaquene
- Capacity: 3,500
- Location: Maputo, Mozambique
- Team colors: Green and white
- President: Isidro Amade
- Head coach: Milagre Macome
- Championships: 9 Mozambican League
- Website: fermaputo.co.mz
Home	Away	Third

Clube Ferroviário de Maputo is a basketball club based in Maputo, Mozambique. The team competes in the Mozambican League. In the Mozambican League, Maputo has won eleven national titles. Ferroviário played in the 2021 season of the Basketball Africa League (BAL).

== History ==
The parent club found in October 1924 as Clube Ferroviário de Loruenço Marques, as the city of Maputo was named Loruenço Marques until 1976. The club was only active in football, until the basketball section was founded in the 1960s.

In 1962, the basketball club won its first national championship. In 1975, the team won two national championships as well.

Then, it took 30 years for Ferroviário to return at the top of Mozambican basketball, as the team won its next national championship in 2005.

In December 2019, Maputo qualified for the first season of the Basketball Africa League (BAL). In the inaugural BAL season, Ferroviário finished second in Group C and as such clinched a playoff spot behind star players Álvaro Masa and Myck Kabongo. In the quarter-finals, the team narrowly lost to Rwandan hosts Patriots (71–73), and was eliminated from the tournament.

In the following years, Ferroviário would lose the national league play-offs to their arch-rivals Ferroviário da Beira.

== Honours ==
Liga Moçambicana de Basquetebol

- Winners (11): 1962, 1975, 1975a, 2005, 2006, 2007, 2008, 2011, 2016, 2017, 2018, 2019

== Personnel ==
=== Current roster ===
Ferroviário de Maputo roster
Players
Coaches

Pos.	No.	Nat.	Name	Ht.	Age
SG	00	(Mozambique)	Macuiana, Muhambi	1.87 m (6 ft 2 in)	25 – 3 November 2000
G	1	(Mozambique)	Chimonzo, Baggio	1.78 m (5 ft 10 in)	33 – 13 December 1992
F	2	(Mozambique)	Martins, Hugo	1.91 m (6 ft 3 in)	31 – 12 March 1995
SF	5	(United States)	Holland, Demarcus (I)	1.93 m (6 ft 4 in)	32 – 2 March 1994
PG	10	(Democratic Republic of the Congo)	Kabongo, Myck (I)	1.91 m (6 ft 3 in)	34 – 12 January 1992
PF	15	(Spain)	Calvo Masa, Álvaro (I)	2.03 m (6 ft 8 in)	43 – 27 March 1983
F	21	(Mozambique)	Caifaz, Milton	2.00 m (6 ft 7 in)	34 – 16 June 1992
SG	22	(Mozambique)	Dinis, Stélio	1.90 m (6 ft 3 in)	32 – 25 November 1993
PF	23	(Mozambique)	Biosse, Yuran	1.89 m (6 ft 2 in)	33 – 2 January 1993
PF	24	(Mozambique)	Muchate, Custódio	1.98 m (6 ft 6 in)	45 – 6 May 1981
PF	32	(Ivory Coast)	Baru, Adjehi (I)	2.06 m (6 ft 9 in)	34 – 12 October 1991
SG	33	(Mozambique)	Uamusse, Manuel	1.92 m (6 ft 4 in)	35 – 15 October 1990
C	34	(Mozambique)	Chire, Inélcio	2.01 m (6 ft 7 in)	35 – 1 June 1991

Head coach

- (Mozambique) Milagre Macome

Assistant coach(es)

- (Mozambique) Marti Mas Zamora

Legend

- (C) Team captain
- (I) Import player
- Injured

- Roster
Updated: 16 May 2021

=== Notable players ===
Note: Flags indicate national team eligibility at FIBA-sanctioned events. Players may hold other non-FIBA nationalities not displayed.

Criteria

To appear in this section a player must have either:

- Set a club record or won an individual award while at the club
- Played at least one official international match for their national team at any time
- Played at least one official NBA match at any time.

- (Mozambique) Octávio Magoliço
- (Mozambique) Pio Matos
- (Mozambique) Custódio Muchate
- (Mozambique) Sete Muianga
- (Mozambique) Gerson Novela
- (South Africa) Cedrick Kalombo
- (Spain) Álvaro Calvo (2018–present)
- (Ivory Coast) Adjehi Baru (2021)
- (Democratic Republic of the Congo) Myck Kabongo (2021)

=== Individual awards ===
Mozambican League MVP

- Álvaro Calvo – 2018, 2019
