= 2014 FIBA Africa Clubs Champions Cup =

- Official tournament logo
- Season: 2014
- Dates: December 11–20
- Teams: 11

Regular season
- Season MVP: (Angola) Eduardo Mingas
- Promoted: (Egypt) Sporting Alexandria

Finals
- Champions: (Angola) Rec do Libolo (1st title)
- Runners-up: (Tunisia) Étoile de Radès
- Third place: (Tunisia) Club Africain

Statistical leaders
Points	(Ivory Coast) Stéphane Konaté	23.0
Rebounds	(Equatorial Guinea) Ricardo Obiang	14.5
Assists	(Angola) Armando Costa	7.1

The 2014 FIBA Africa Basketball Club Championship (29th edition), was an international basketball tournament held in La Goulette, Tunisia from December 11 to 20, 2014. The tournament, organized by FIBA Africa and hosted by Club Africain was contested by 11 clubs split into 2 groups of six, the top four of each group qualifying for the knock-out stage, quarter, semi-finals and final.

Clube Recreativo Desportivo do Libolo from Angola was the winner.

== Draw ==
Group A	Group B
(France) BC M'Tsapere * (Tunisia) Club Africain (Equatorial Guinea) Malabo Kings (Angola) Recreativo do Libolo (Egypt) Sporting Alexandria	(Ivory Coast) Abidjan Basket Club (Democratic Republic of the Congo) ASB Mazembe (Tunisia) Étoile Sportive Radès (Nigeria) Mark Mentors (Angola) Primeiro de Agosto (Tunisia) US Monastir

- A club from Mayotte, an island off the African southeast coast under French rule

== Preliminary round ==
Times given below are in UTC+1.

=== Group A ===
Qualified for the quarter-finals

	Team	M	W	L	PF	PA	Diff	P
1.	(Angola) Rec Libolo	4	4	0	250	188	+62	8
2.	(Egypt) Sporting Alexandria	4	3	1	225	191	+34	7
3.	(Tunisia) Club Africain	4	2	2	339	254	+85	6
4.	(France) BC M'Tsapere	4	0	4	216	355	-139	4
5.	(Equatorial Guinea) Malabo Kings **	2	1	1	128	170	-42	3

  - Lost first two matches for fielding ineligible players

11 December 2014
12:00

Boxscore

Malabo Kings (Equatorial Guinea)	79–69	(Angola) Rec Libolo
Scoring by quarter: 27-16, 16-20, 20-14, 16-19
Pts: Milam, Osa 18; Rebs: three players 5 Asts: Balboa 8		Pts: Mingas 17; Rebs: Coleman 7 Asts: Mílton 4

Salle Ben Ammar, La Goulette, Tunis

17:00

Boxscore

Club Africain (Tunisia)	126–45	(France) BC M'Tsapere
Scoring by quarter: 33-9, 22-14, 31-9, 40-13
Pts: Chennoufi 17; Rebs: Ez-Zahi 10; Asts: Hdidane 6		Pts: Buscaglia 18; Rebs: Madi 4 Asts: Madi 4

Salle Ben Ammar, La Goulette, Tunis

12 December 2014
13:00

Boxscore

BC M'Tsapere (France)	56–89	(Angola) Rec Libolo
Scoring by quarter: 14-22, 15-26, 21-16, 6-25
Pts: Madi 19; Rebs: Maoulida 10; Asts: Buscaglia 5		Pts: Coleman 20; Rebs: Vander 10; Asts: Mílton 5

Salle Ben Ammar, La Goulette, Tunis

14:00

Boxscore

Club Africain (Tunisia)	66–68	(Egypt) Sporting
Scoring by quarter: 16-14, 19-10, 17-14, 14-30
Pts: Hdidane 15; Rebs: Hdidane 7 Asts: Justice 5		Pts: B.Romdhane 16; Rebs: Badr 6 Asts: Badr 3

Salle Ben Ammar, La Goulette, Tunis

13 December 2014
14:00

Boxscore

Sporting (Egypt)	77–76	(Equatorial Guinea) Malabo Kings
Scoring by quarter: 16-21, 16-18, 22-17, 23-20
Pts: B.Romdhane 23; Rebs: B.Romdhane 7 Asts: Badr 5		Pts: Milam 18; Rebs: Obiang 9 Asts: Milam 6

Salle Ben Ammar, La Goulette, Tunis

18:00

Boxscore

Rec Libolo (Angola)	78–70 (OT)	(Tunisia) Club Africain
Scoring by quarter: 12-22, 18-13, 16-12, 16-15, Overtime: 16-8
Pts: Owens 23; Rebs: Coleman 11; Asts: Mílton 4		Pts: Haislip 25; Rebs: Hdidane 13; Asts: Justice 5

Salle Ben Ammar, La Goulette, Tunis

15 December 2014
17:00

Boxscore

Club Africain (Tunisia)	77–63	(Equatorial Guinea) Malabo Kings
Scoring by quarter: 25-9, 16-15, 16-18, 20-21
Pts: Haislip 31; Rebs: Dhifallah 7 Asts: Hdidane 5		Pts: Balboa 20; Rebs: Obiang 11; Asts: Pascual 3

Salle Ben Ammar, La Goulette, Tunis
Referees: Fernando Pacheco (ANG), Chlif Abdelilah (MAR), Babacar Gueye (SEN)

19:00

Boxscore

Sporting (Egypt)	75–62	(France) BC M'Tsapere
Scoring by quarter: 14-16, 19-18, 24-12, 18-16
Pts: Braa 17; Rebs: Abdel-Bary 6 Asts: Abdel-Bary 3		Pts: Vogt 20; Rebs: Maoulida 7 Asts: Buscaglia 4

Salle Ben Ammar, La Goulette, Tunis
Referees: Hassane Kamate (CIV), Sami Belgharek (TUN), Banza Tonton (COD)

16 December 2014
15:00

Boxscore

Rec Libolo (Angola)	63–62	(Egypt) Sporting
Scoring by quarter: 15-9, 19-20, 17-12, 12-21
Pts: Mingas 19; Rebs: Mingas, Vander 8 Asts: Mingas 4		Pts: B.Romdhane 23; Rebs: B.Romdhane 9 Asts: B.Romdhane, Ahmed 2

Salle Ben Ammar, La Goulette, Tunis
Referees: Banza Tonton (COD), Youssouf Maiga (MLI), Arnauld Njilo (CMR)

19:00

Boxscore

BC M'Tsapere (France)	65–53	(Equatorial Guinea) Malabo Kings
Scoring by quarter: 14-10, 17-11, 16-15, 18-17
Pts: Obiang 19; Rebs: Obiang 12; Asts: Balboa 3		Pts: Vogt 15; Rebs: Buscaglia 11; Asts: Buscaglia, Gaudin 3

Salle Ben Ammar, La Goulette, Tunis
Referees: Aymen Chakroun (TUN), Kingsley Ojeaburu (NGR), Hassane Kamate (CIV)

=== Group B ===
Qualified for the quarter-finals

	Team	M	W	L	PF	PA	Diff	P
1.	(Tunisia) ES Radès	5	5	0	390	364	+26	10
2.	(Angola) Primeiro de Agosto	5	4	1	407	350	+57	9
3.	(Tunisia) US Monastir	5	3	2	352	338	+14	8
4.	(Democratic Republic of the Congo) ASB Mazembe	5	2	3	334	362	-28	7
5.	(Nigeria) Mark Mentors	5	1	4	338	371	-33	6
6.	(Ivory Coast) Abidjan BC	5	0	5	329	365	-36	5

11 December 2014
14:00

Boxscore

1º de Agosto (Angola)	75–62	(Tunisia) US Monastir
Scoring by quarter: 18-13, 14-18, 24-16, 19-15
Pts: Moore 18; Rebs: Moore, Armando 6 Asts: Armando 9		Pts: Mitrovic 15; Rebs: three players 5 Asts: Laghnej 3

Salle Ben Ammar, La Goulette, Tunis

19:00

Boxscore

Abidjan BC (Ivory Coast)	65–68	(Nigeria) Mark Mentors
Scoring by quarter: 15-16, 11-19, 22-13, 17-20
Pts: Affi 23; Rebs: Amalabian 7 Asts: Konaté 3		Pts: Ugboaja 18; Rebs: Ugboaja 15; Asts: Daudu, Gumut 2

Salle Ben Ammar, La Goulette, Tunis

14 December 2014
18:00

Boxscore

ES Radès (Tunisia)	74–67	(Democratic Republic of the Congo) ASB Mazembe
Scoring by quarter: 25-17, 17-14, 17-15, 15-21
Pts: Abbassi 18; Rebs: Abbassi 5 Asts: Obada 7		Pts: Tolembo 28; Rebs: Tolembo 13; Asts: Tolembo, Mualaba 3

Salle Ben Ammar, La Goulette, Tunis

12 December 2014
11:00

Boxscore

1º de Agosto (Angola)	88–74	(Nigeria) Mark Mentors
Scoring by quarter: 21-19, 28-14, 19-26, 20-15
Pts: Briggs 17; Rebs: Briggs, Armando 6 Asts: Armando 8		Pts: Yahaya 15; Rebs: Ugboaja 7 Asts: Daudu 7

Salle Ben Ammar, La Goulette, Tunis

15:00

Boxscore

Abidjan BC (Ivory Coast)	70–72	(Tunisia) ES Radès
Scoring by quarter: 14-15, 20-23, 17-12, 19-22
Pts: Konaté 24; Rebs: Jackson 11; Asts: Konaté 3		Pts: Gadson 24; Rebs: Mathews 7 Asts: Obada 6

Salle Ben Ammar, La Goulette, Tunis

19:00

Boxscore

US Monastir (Tunisia)	68–54	(Democratic Republic of the Congo) ASB Mazembe
Scoring by quarter: 20-9, 14-10, 14-19, 20-16
Pts: Mitrović 15; Rebs: Mitrović 9 Asts: Laghnej 5		Pts: Tolembo 11; Rebs: Ngongo 10; Asts: Mualaba 3

Salle Ben Ammar, La Goulette, Tunis

13 December 2014
12:00

Boxscore

US Monastir (Tunisia)	66–59	(Ivory Coast) Abidjan BC
Scoring by quarter: 13-23, 15-12, 24-16, 14-8
Pts: Jaziri 21; Rebs: Slimane 10; Asts: Laghnej 4		Pts: Konaté 19; Rebs: Kone 10; Asts: Gbotto 5

Salle Ben Ammar, La Goulette, Tunis

16:00

Boxscore

Mark Mentors (Nigeria)	65–73	(Tunisia) ES Radès
Scoring by quarter: 7-14, 17-17, 18-26, 23-16
Pts: Yahaya 20; Rebs: Ugboaja 12; Asts: three players 2		Pts: Maghrebi 18; Rebs: Mathews 10; Asts: Obada 8

Salle Ben Ammar, La Goulette, Tunis

20:00

Boxscore

ASB Mazembe (Democratic Republic of the Congo)	65–82	(Angola) 1º de Agosto
Scoring by quarter: 15-22, 17-19, 14-16, 19-25
Pts: Tolembo 19; Rebs: Ngongo 11; Asts: Samuna, Mualaba 3		Pts: Briggs 24; Rebs: Kikas 7 Asts: Armando 7

Salle Ben Ammar, La Goulette, Tunis

15 December 2014
11:00

Boxscore

ASB Mazembe (Democratic Republic of the Congo)	79–72	(Ivory Coast) Abidjan BC
Scoring by quarter: 25-19, 18-17, 13-24, 23-12
Pts: Tshimbanga 20; Rebs: Mulamba 9 Asts: Mualaba 6		Pts: Affi 26; Rebs: Konaté 8 Asts: Konaté 3

Salle Ben Ammar, La Goulette, Tunis
Referees: Kingsley Ojeaburu (NGR), Amir Taboubi (TUN), Aymen Chakroun (TUN)

13:00

Boxscore

1º de Agosto (Angola)	82–86 (OT)	(Tunisia) ES Radès
Scoring by quarter: 23-10, 6-24, 27-15, 20-27, Overtime: 6-10
Pts: Briggs 30; Rebs: Ndoniema 11; Asts: Armando 7		Pts: Abbassi 21; Rebs: Mathews 11; Asts: Obada 8

Salle Ben Ammar, La Goulette, Tunis
Referees: Youssouf Maiga (MLI), Hesham Kotb (EGY), Steve Koukoute (CAF)

15:00

Boxscore

Mark Mentors (Nigeria)	65–76	(Tunisia) US Monastir
Scoring by quarter: 23-20, 12-24, 13-13, 17-19
Pts: Koko 20; Rebs: Koko, Ugboaja 11; Asts: Gumut 5		Pts: Slimane 23; Rebs: Lahyani 12; Asts: Slimane, Aissaoui 5

Salle Ben Ammar, La Goulette, Tunis
Referees: Arnauld Njilo (CMR), David Manuel (ANG), Sofiane Youcef (ALG)

16 December 2014
11:00

Boxscore

Abidjan BC (Ivory Coast)	63–80	(Angola) 1º de Agosto
Scoring by quarter: 9-26, 15-17, 20-24, 19-13
Pts: Konaté 25; Rebs: Jackson 6 Asts: Amalabian 4		Pts: Nealy 19; Rebs: Nealy 6 Asts: Armando 3

Salle Ben Ammar, La Goulette, Tunis
Referees: Sami Belgharek (TUN), Babacar Gueye (SEN), Amir Taboubi (TUN)

13:00

Boxscore

ASB Mazembe (Democratic Republic of the Congo)	69–66	(Nigeria) Mark Mentors
Scoring by quarter: 25-14, 19-20, 12-19, 13-13
Pts: Tolembo 23; Rebs: Tolembo, Kasongo 9 Asts: Mualaba 10		Pts: Gumut 18; Rebs: Ugboaja 10; Asts: Gumut, Daudu 3

Salle Ben Ammar, La Goulette, Tunis
Referees: Hesham Kotb (EGY), David Manuel (ANG), Steve Koukoute (CAF)

17:00

Boxscore

ES Radès (Tunisia)	85–80	(Tunisia) US Monastir
Scoring by quarter: 16-16, 21-24, 24-24, 24-16
Pts: Mathews 17; Rebs: Mathews 12; Asts: Obada 8		Pts: Slimane 19; Rebs: Lahyani 10; Asts: Seyeh 5

Salle Ben Ammar, La Goulette, Tunis

== Knockout round ==
Quarter-finals
Thursday 18 December – 13:00
(France) BC M'Tsapere	76
(Tunisia) ES Radès	106
Thursday 18 December – 15:00
(Tunisia) US Monastir	57
(Egypt) Sporting	74
Thursday 18 December – 17:00
(Tunisia) Club Africain	79
(Angola) 1º de Agosto	69
Thursday 18 December – 19:00
(Democratic Republic of the Congo) ASB Mazembe	58
(Angola) Rec Libolo	81

5th-8th Place
Friday 19 December 11:00
(Democratic Republic of the Congo) ASB Mazembe	59
(Angola) 1º de Agosto	67
Friday 19 December 13:00
(France) BC M'Tsapere	65
(Tunisia) US Monastir	97

5th place
Saturday 20 December 12:30
(Angola) 1º de Agosto	78
(Tunisia) US Monastir	86
7th place
Saturday 20 December 10:30
(Democratic Republic of the Congo) ASB Mazembe	82
(France) BC M'Tsapere	67

Quarter-finals
Thursday 18 December – 13:00
(France) BC M'Tsapere	76
(Tunisia) ES Radès	106
Thursday 18 December – 15:00
(Tunisia) US Monastir	57
(Egypt) Sporting	74
Thursday 18 December – 17:00
(Tunisia) Club Africain	79
(Angola) 1º de Agosto	69
Thursday 18 December – 19:00
(Democratic Republic of the Congo) ASB Mazembe	58
(Angola) Rec Libolo	81

Semi-finals
Friday 19 December 15:00
(Tunisia) ES Radès	93
(Egypt) Sporting	80
Friday 19 December 17:00
(Angola) Rec Libolo	84
(Tunisia) Club Africain	63

Final
Saturday 20 December 17:00
(Angola) Rec Libolo	86
(Tunisia) ES Radès	68
3rd place
Saturday 20 December 14:30
(Tunisia) Club Africain	79
(Egypt) Sporting	74

=== 9–12th place ===
18 December 2014
11:00

Boxscore

Abidjan BC (Ivory Coast)	74–86	(Equatorial Guinea) Malabo Kings
Scoring by quarter: 15-25, 16-19, 14-25, 29-17
Pts: Konaté 29; Rebs: Jackson 8 Asts: Meite 8		Pts: Obiang 28; Rebs: Obiang 23; Asts: Nchama 6

Salle Ben Ammar, La Goulette

=== Quarter finals ===
18 December 2014
13:00

Boxscore

BC M'Tsapere (France)	76–106	(Tunisia) ES Radès
Scoring by quarter: 20-30, 26-31, 13-19, 17-26
Pts: Vogt 28; Rebs: Vogt 10; Asts: Vogt, M'lardou 2		Pts: Kechrid 23; Rebs: Obada, Abbassi 6 Asts: three players 4

Salle Ben Ammar, La Goulette
Referees: Fernando Pacheco (ANG), Youssouf Maiga (MLI), Sofiane Youcef (ALG)

15:00

Boxscore

US Monastir (Tunisia)	57–74	(Egypt) Sporting
Scoring by quarter: 17-27, 15-16, 14-14, 11-17
Pts: Lahyani 18; Rebs: Lahyani, Trimech 7 Asts: Laghnej 6		Pts: B.Romdhane 23; Rebs: B.Romdhane 11; Asts: B.Romdhane, Badr 4

Salle Ben Ammar, La Goulette
Referees: David Manuel (ANG), Babacar Gueye (SEN), Arnauld Njilo (CMR)

17:00

Boxscore

Club Africain (Tunisia)	79–69	(Angola) 1º de Agosto
Scoring by quarter: 17-21, 13-13, 23-23, 26-12
Pts: Haislip 25; Rebs: Hdidane, Dhifallah 8 Asts: Hdidane, Justice 4		Pts: Moore 19; Rebs: Moore 7 Asts: Armando 5

Salle Ben Ammar, La Goulette

19:00

Boxscore

ASB Mazembe (Democratic Republic of the Congo)	49–82	(Angola) Rec Libolo
Scoring by quarter: 16-24, 12-20, 8-18, 13-20
Pts: Dibessa 19; Rebs: Mulamba 5 Asts: Mualaba 3		Pts: Mingas 15; Rebs: Vander 11; Asts: Mílton 4

Salle Ben Ammar, La Goulette
Referees: Chlif Abdelilah (MAR), Sami Belgharek (TUN), Hesham Kotb (EGY)

=== 9th place ===
19 December 2014
09:00

Boxscore

Mark Mentors (Nigeria)	91–85	(Equatorial Guinea) Malabo Kings
Scoring by quarter: 19-20, 20-17, 28-30, 24-18
Pts: Gumut 32; Rebs: Koko 8 Asts: Dike 5		Pts: Balboa 19; Rebs: Obiang 12; Asts: E.Nchama 4

Salle Ben Ammar, La Goulette

=== 5th-8th place ===
19 December 2014
11:00

Boxscore

ASB Mazembe (Democratic Republic of the Congo)	59–67	(Angola) 1º de Agosto
Scoring by quarter: 8-25, 23-12, 10-18, 18-12
Pts: Mulamba 17; Rebs: Mulamba 9 Asts: Mualaba 5		Pts: Moore 20; Rebs: Armando 9 Asts: Armando 11

Salle Ben Ammar, La Goulette
Referees: Sami Belgharek (TUN), Hesham Kotb (EGY), Amir Taboubi (TUN)

13:00

Boxscore

BC M'Tsapere (France)	65–97	(Tunisia) US Monastir
Scoring by quarter: 17-21, 21-23, 21-26, 6-27
Pts: Madi 20; Rebs: Maoulida 7 Asts: Madi 4		Pts: Trimech 24; Rebs: Slimane 9 Asts: Laghnej, Seyeh 5

Salle Ben Ammar, La Goulette
Referees: Chlif Abdelilah (MAR)

=== Semifinals ===
19 December 2014
15:00

Boxscore

ES Radès (Tunisia)	93–80	(Egypt) Sporting
Scoring by quarter: 23-17, 26-10, 18-23, 26-30
Pts: Abbassi 26; Rebs: Mathews 14; Asts: Obada 5		Pts: B.Romdhane 21; Rebs: Braa, Rashed 6 Asts: B.Romdhane 4

Salle Ben Ammar, La Goulette
Referees: Banza Tonton (COD), Kingsley Ojeaburu (NGR), Arnauld Njilo (CMR)

17:00

[ Boxscore]

Rec Libolo (Angola)	84–63	(Tunisia) Club Africain
Scoring by quarter: 16-16, 26-12, 19-15, 23-20
Pts: Mingas 19; Rebs: Mingas 12; Asts: Mílton 6		Pts: Haislip 15; Rebs: Ghyaza 7 Asts: Knioua 5

Salle Ben Ammar, La Goulette
Referees: Hassen Kamate, Babacar Gueye (SEN), Youssouf Maiga (MLI)

=== 7th place ===
20 December 2014
10:30

Boxscore

ASB Mazembe (Democratic Republic of the Congo)	82–67	(France) BC M'Tsapere
Scoring by quarter: 16-20, 31-14, 18-16, 17-17
Pts: Tshimbanga 26; Rebs: Tshimbanga 7 Asts: Tshimbanga, Samuna 4		Pts: Vogt 22; Rebs: Buscaglia 10; Asts: Buscaglia 3

Salle Ben Ammar, La Goulette

=== 5th place ===
20 December 2014
12:30

Boxscore

1º de Agosto (Angola)	vs.	(Tunisia) US Monastir
Scoring by quarter: 20-26, 19-30, 23-21, 16-9
Pts: Moore 28; Rebs: Moore 6 Asts: Armando 7		Pts: Saied 29; Rebs: Trimech 8 Asts: Laghnej 9

Salle Ben Ammar, La Goulette
Referees: Hesham Kotb (EGY), Youssouf Maiga (MLI), Sofiane Youcef (ALG)

=== Bronze medal game ===
20 December 2014
14:30

Boxscore

Club Africain (Tunisia)	79–74	(Egypt) Sporting
Scoring by quarter: 24-22, 10-17, 20-11, 25-24
Pts: Haislip 24; Rebs: Hdidane 8 Asts: Knioua 4		Pts: B.Romdhane 19; Rebs: B.Romdhane 12; Asts: Shousha 3

Salle Ben Ammar, La Goulette
Referees: Chlif Abdelilah (MAR), Babacar Gueye (SEN), Kingsley Ojeaburu (NGR)

=== Gold medal game ===
20 December 2014
17:00

Boxscore

Rec Libolo (Angola)	86–68	(Tunisia) ES Radès
Scoring by quarter: 12-17, 17-19, 26-13, 31-19
Pts: Mílton 21; Rebs: Vander 10; Asts: Mingas 5		Pts: Gadson 24; Rebs: Abbassi, Maghrebi 5 Asts: Obada 5

Salle Ben Ammar, La Goulette
Referees: Banza Tonton (COD), Hassane Kamate (CIV), Arnauld Njilo (CMR)

== Final standings ==
Rank	Team	Record
Gold medal	(Angola) Recreativo do Libolo	7–0
Silver medal	(Tunisia) ES Radès	7–1
Bronze medal	(Tunisia) Club Africain	4–3
4	(Egypt) Sporting Alexandria	4–3
5	(Tunisia) US Monastir	5–3
6	(Angola) Primeiro de Agosto	5–3
7	(Democratic Republic of the Congo) ASB Mazembe	3–5
8	(France) BC M'Tsapere	0–7
9	(Nigeria) Mark Mentors	2–4
10	(Equatorial Guinea) Malabo Kings	2–4
11	(Ivory Coast) Abidjan Basket Club	0–6

Recreativo do Libolo roster
Andre Owens, Benvindo Quimbamba, Eduardo Mingas, Elmer Felix, Erik Coleman, Ezequiel Silva, Filipe Abraão, Luís Costa, Manda João, Mílton Barros, Valdelício Joaquim, Vladimir Pontes, Coach: Norberto Alves

== Statistical leaders ==
=== Individual Tournament Highs ===
Points

Rank	Name	G	Pts	PPG
1	(Ivory Coast) Stéphane Konaté	6	138	23
2	(Tunisia) Ben Romdhane	5	102	20.4
3	(United States) Marcus Haislip	7	135	19.3
4	(Equatorial Guinea) Ricardo Obiang	4	77	19.3
5	(Angola) Reggie Moore	8	137	17.1
6	(United States) Cheyne Gadson	7	120	17.1
7	(United States) Steve Briggs	8	130	16.3
8	(Switzerland) Oliver Vogt	6	95	15.8
9	(Democratic Republic of the Congo) Evariste Tolembo	8	124	15.5
10	(Tunisia) Mohamed Abbassi	8	122	15.3

Rebounds

Rank	Name	G	Rbs	RPG
1	(Equatorial Guinea) Ricardo Obiang	4	58	14.5
2	(Nigeria) Ejike Ugboaja	5	55	11
3	(Angola) Eduardo Mingas	6	49	8.2
4	(Tunisia) Ben Romdhane	5	41	8.2
5	(United States) Averon Mathews	8	64	8
6	(Angola) Valdelício Joaquim	6	48	8
7	(Tunisia) Mohamed Hdidane	7	48	6.9
8	(Tunisia) Firas Lahyani	8	54	6.8
9	(Nigeria) Victor Koko	6	39	6.5
10	(Democratic Republic of the Congo) Prince Ngongo	7	44	6.3

Assists

Rank	Name	G	Ast	APG
1	(Angola) Armando Costa	8	57	7.1
2	(Tunisia) Omar Abada	8	51	6.4
3	(Democratic Republic of the Congo) Johnny Mualaba	7	33	4.7
4	(Tunisia) Marouan Laghnej	8	35	4.4
5	(Angola) Mílton Barros	6	23	3.8
6	(Tunisia) Mohamed Hdidane	7	25	3.6
6	(United States) James Justice	7	25	3.6
8	(Nigeria) Aigbokhaode Daudu	6	20	3.3
9	(Equatorial Guinea) Jose Eyi Nchama	4	13	3.3
10	(United States) Cheyne Gadson	7	22	3.1

Steals

Rank	Name	G	Sts	SPG
1	(Angola) Armando Costa	8	17	2.1
2	(France) Aboubacar Madi	7	15	2.1
3	(Equatorial Guinea) Richard Nguema	4	7	1.8
4	(Tunisia) Mohamed Maghrebi	8	12	1.5
5	(Egypt) Wael Badr	6	9	1.5
5	(Ivory Coast) Stéphane Konaté	6	9	1.5
5	(Ivory Coast) Alassane Meite	6	9	1.5
8	(Equatorial Guinea) Francisco Nzang	4	6	1.5
9	(Tunisia) Firas Lahyani	8	11	1.4
9	(Democratic Republic of the Congo) Evariste Tolembo	8	11	1.4

Blocks

Rank	Name	G	Bks	BPG
1	(Nigeria) Victor Koko	6	10	1.7
2	(Tunisia) Firas Lahyani	8	12	1.5
3	(United States) Erik Coleman	6	9	1.5
4	(Tunisia) Lassaad Chouaya	7	7	1
5	(Democratic Republic of the Congo) Evariste Tolembo	8	7	0.9
6	(United States) Averon Mathews	8	6	0.8
7	(United States) Jamee Jackson	6	5	0.8
8	(Ivory Coast) Seguy Kraka	6	4	0.7
8	(Nigeria) Abdul Yahaya	6	4	0.7
10	(Tunisia) Ben Romdhane	5	3	0.6

Turnovers

Rank	Name	G	Tos	TPG
1	(Ivory Coast) Stéphane Konaté	6	26	4.3
2	(Switzerland) Vladimir Buscaglia	7	28	4
2	(France) Aboubacar Madi	7	28	4
4	(Nigeria) Aigbokhaode Daudu	6	21	3.5
5	(Tunisia) Radhouane Slimane	8	25	3.1
6	(Tunisia) Omar Abada	8	23	2.9
7	(Nigeria) Ejike Ugboaja	5	13	2.6
8	(Tunisia) Marouan Laghnej	8	20	2.5
8	(Tunisia) Firas Lahyani	8	20	2.5
10	(Angola) Armando Costa	8	19	2.4

2-point field goal percentage

Pos	Name	A	M	%
1	(Democratic Republic of the Congo) Evariste Tolembo	71	48	67.6
2	(Angola) Reggie Moore	66	44	66.7
3	(Angola) Valdelício Joaquim	47	31	66
4	(United States) Steve Briggs	59	38	64.4
5	(Tunisia) Ben Romdhane	43	26	60.5
6	(United States) Marcus Haislip	60	36	60
7	(Tunisia) Firas Lahyani	50	30	60
8	(Ivory Coast) Eric Affi	37	22	59.5
9	(Equatorial Guinea) Ricardo Obiang	53	31	58.5
10	(Ivory Coast) Stéphane Konaté	60	35	58.3

3-point field goal percentage

Pos	Name	A	M	%
1	(United States) Cheyne Gadson	28	16	57.1
2	(Tunisia) Mohamed Maghrebi	42	21	50
3	(Angola) Vladimir Pontes	18	9	50
4	(Equatorial Guinea) Richard Nguema	27	12	44.4
5	(Switzerland) Oliver Vogt	14	6	42.9
6	(Tunisia) Hichem Ez-Zahi	12	5	41.7
7	(Nigeria) Stanley Gumut	36	14	38.9
8	(Tunisia) Marouan Kechrid	39	15	38.5
9	(Tunisia) Hosni Saied	47	18	38.3
10	(Ivory Coast) Stéphane Konaté	33	12	36.4

Free throw percentage

Pos	Name	A	M	%
1	(Angola) Mílton Barros	27	24	88.9
2	(Tunisia) Mohamed Abbassi	39	34	87.2
3	(United States) Marcus Haislip	31	27	87.1
4	(Angola) Valdelício Joaquim	22	18	81.8
5	(United States) Cheyne Gadson	37	30	81.1
6	(Switzerland) Oliver Vogt	34	27	79.4
7	(Switzerland) Vladimir Buscaglia	24	19	79.2
8	(Nigeria) Abdul Yahaya	28	22	78.6
9	(Ivory Coast) Bohoui Gbotto	18	14	77.8
10	(Angola) Reggie Moore	37	28	75.7

=== Individual Game Highs ===
Department	Name	Total	Opponent
Points	(Nigeria) Stanley Gumut	32	(Equatorial Guinea) Malabo Kings
Rebounds	(Equatorial Guinea) Ricardo Obiang	23	(Ivory Coast) Abidjan BC
Assists	(Angola) Armando Costa	11	(Democratic Republic of the Congo) ASB Mazembe
Steals	four players	5	
Blocks	(Tunisia) Firas Lahyani	4	(Nigeria) Mark Mentors
2-point field goal percentage	(United States) Marcus Haislip	91.7% (11/12)	(Equatorial Guinea) Malabo Kings
3-point field goal percentage	(Nigeria) Stanley Gumut	100% (3/3)	(Democratic Republic of the Congo) ASB Mazembe
Free throw percentage	(Tunisia) Mohamed Abbassi	100% (15/15)	(Egypt) Sporting
Turnovers	(Switzerland) Vladimir Buscaglia	8	(Angola) Rec do Libolo

=== Team Tournament Highs ===
Points

Rank	Name	G	Pts	PPG
1	(Tunisia) ES Radès	8	657	82.1
2	(Angola) Recreativo do Libolo	6	482	80.3
3	(Tunisia) Club Africain	7	560	80
4	(Angola) 1º de Agosto	8	621	77.6
5	(Equatorial Guinea) Malabo Kings	4	299	74.8
6	(Tunisia) US Monastir	8	592	74
7	(Egypt) Sporting Alexandria	6	433	72.2
8	(Nigeria) Mark Mentors	6	429	71.5
9	(Ivory Coast) Abidjan Basket Club	6	403	67.2
10	(Democratic Republic of the Congo) ASB Mazembe	8	524	65.5

Rebounds

Rank	Name	G	Rbs	RPG
1	(Angola) Recreativo do Libolo	6	259	43.2
2	(Tunisia) Club Africain	7	300	42.9
3	(Equatorial Guinea) Malabo Kings	4	160	40
4	(Nigeria) Mark Mentors	6	230	38.3
5	(Tunisia) ES Radès	8	287	35.9
6	(Angola) 1º de Agosto	8	286	35.8
7	(Democratic Republic of the Congo) ASB Mazembe	8	284	35.5
8	(Ivory Coast) Abidjan Basket Club	6	207	34.5
9	(Tunisia) US Monastir	8	274	34.2
10	(Egypt) Sporting Alexandria	6	203	33.8

Assists

Rank	Name	G	Ast	APG
1	(Angola) 1º de Agosto	8	141	17.6
2	(Tunisia) Club Africain	7	114	16.3
3	(Angola) Recreativo do Libolo	6	95	15.8
4	(Tunisia) ES Radès	8	122	15.3
5	(Tunisia) US Monastir	8	117	14.6
6	(Equatorial Guinea) Malabo Kings	4	48	12
7	(Nigeria) Mark Mentors	6	71	11.8
8	(France) BC M'Tsapere	7	82	11.7
9	(Egypt) Sporting Alexandria	6	69	11.5
10	(Democratic Republic of the Congo) ASB Mazembe	8	84	10.5

Steals

Rank	Name	G	Sts	SPG
1	(Tunisia) ES Radès	8	64	8
2	(Ivory Coast) Abidjan Basket Club	6	47	7.8
3	(Equatorial Guinea) Malabo Kings	4	31	7.8
4	(Angola) 1º de Agosto	8	61	7.6
5	(Tunisia) US Monastir	8	60	7.5
6	(Democratic Republic of the Congo) ASB Mazembe	8	58	7.3
7	(Egypt) Sporting Alexandria	6	44	7.3
8	(Nigeria) Mark Mentors	6	41	6.8
9	(France) BC M'Tsapere	7	43	6.1
9	(Tunisia) Club Africain	7	43	6.1

Blocks

Rank	Name	G	Bks	BPG
1	(Nigeria) Mark Mentors	6	18	3
2	(Tunisia) US Monastir	8	21	2.6
3	(Ivory Coast) Abidjan Basket Club	6	15	2.5
3	(Angola) Recreativo do Libolo	6	15	2.5
5	(Tunisia) Club Africain	7	14	2
6	(Democratic Republic of the Congo) ASB Mazembe	8	13	1.6
6	(Angola) 1º de Agosto	8	13	1.6
6	(Tunisia) ES Radès	8	13	1.6
9	(France) BC M'Tsapere	7	7	1
10	(Egypt) Sporting Alexandria	6	6	1

Turnovers

Rank	Name	G	Tos	TPG
1	(France) BC M'Tsapere	7	132	18.9
2	(Tunisia) US Monastir	8	125	15.6
3	(Ivory Coast) Abidjan Basket Club	6	92	15.3
4	(Nigeria) Mark Mentors	6	91	15.2
5	(Angola) 1º de Agosto	8	114	14.3
6	(Tunisia) ES Radès	8	107	13.4
7	(Tunisia) Club Africain	7	92	13.1
8	(Democratic Republic of the Congo) ASB Mazembe	8	104	13
9	(Angola) Recreativo do Libolo	6	69	11.5
10	(Egypt) Sporting Alexandria	6	68	11.3

2-point field goal percentage

Pos	Name	A	M	%
1	(Angola) 1º de Agosto	310	174	56.1
2	(Tunisia) Club Africain	270	146	54.1
3	(Tunisia) US Monastir	303	162	53.5
4	(Egypt) Sporting Alexandria	188	98	52.1
5	(Angola) Recreativo do Libolo	219	114	52.1
6	(Ivory Coast) Abidjan Basket Club	224	115	51.3
7	(Tunisia) ES Radès	321	160	49.8
8	(Nigeria) Mark Mentors	237	118	49.8
9	(Equatorial Guinea) Malabo Kings	156	77	49.4
10	(Democratic Republic of the Congo) ASB Mazembe	338	152	45

3-point field goal percentage

Pos	Name	A	M	%
1	(Tunisia) ES Radès	190	70	36.8
2	(Angola) Recreativo do Libolo	164	53	32.3
3	(Tunisia) Club Africain	169	52	30.8
4	(Nigeria) Mark Mentors	123	37	30.1
5	(Angola) 1º de Agosto	199	57	28.6
6	(Tunisia) US Monastir	159	44	27.7
7	(Equatorial Guinea) Malabo Kings	132	35	26.5
8	(France) BC M'Tsapere	163	43	26.4
9	(Democratic Republic of the Congo) ASB Mazembe	174	44	25.3
10	(Egypt) Sporting Alexandria	167	41	24.6

Free throw percentage

Pos	Name	A	M	%
1	(Tunisia) Club Africain	153	112	73.2
2	(Tunisia) ES Radès	175	127	72.6
3	(Angola) Recreativo do Libolo	131	95	72.5
4	(Tunisia) US Monastir	192	136	70.8
5	(France) BC M'Tsapere	121	81	66.9
6	(Angola) 1º de Agosto	157	102	65
7	(Equatorial Guinea) Malabo Kings	62	40	64.5
8	(Egypt) Sporting Alexandria	177	114	64.4
9	(Ivory Coast) Abidjan Basket Club	169	98	58
10	(Nigeria) Mark Mentors	143	82	57.3

=== Team Game highs ===
Department	Name	Total	Opponent
Points	(Tunisia) Club Africain	126	(France) BC M'Tsapere
Rebounds	(Tunisia) Club Africain	56	(France) BC M'Tsapere
Assists	(Tunisia) Club Africain	33	(France) BC M'Tsapere
Steals	(Tunisia) Club Africain	15	(France) BC M'Tsapere
Blocks	(Tunisia) Club Africain (Ivory Coast) Abidjan BC	6	(France) BC M'Tsapere (Tunisia) ES Radès
2-point field goal percentage	(Tunisia) US Monastir	72.1% (31/43)	(France) BC M'Tsapere
3-point field goal percentage	(Tunisia) ES Radès	48.5% (16/33)	(France) BC M'Tsapere
Free throw percentage	(France) BC M'Tsapere	100% (2/2)	(Tunisia) Club Africain
Turnovers	(France) BC M'Tsapere	25	(Tunisia) Club Africain

== All Tournament Team ==
G	(Angola)	Mílton Barros
F	(Tunisia)	Makrem Ben Romdhane
F	(Angola)	Eduardo Mingas
C	(United States)	Marcus Haislip
C	(United States)	Averon Mathews

2014 FIBA Africa Clubs Champions Cup

Clube Recreativo Desportivo do Libolo
1st title

Most Valuable Player
(Angola) Eduardo Mingas

== See also ==
2013 FIBA Africa Championship
