= Mohamed Abbassi =

Puerto Rican-American basketball player

No. 24 – US Monastir
- Position: Power forward
- League: Championnat National A Basketball Africa League

Personal information
- Born: 28 March 1991 (age 35) Elghouiba, Tunisia
- Listed height: 2.02 m (6 ft 8 in)
- Listed weight: 220 lb (100 kg)

Career information
- Playing career: 2010–present

Career history
- 2010-2014: JS Kairouan
- 2013: →ES Sahel
- 2014–2020: Étoile Sportive de Radès
- 2020–2021: Ezzahra Sports
- 2021–present: US Monastir

Career highlights
- BAL champion (2022); 3× Tunisian League champion (2017, 2018, 2022); 4× Tunisian Cup winner (2017–2019, 2022); Tunisian Federation Cup winner (2020); Tunisian League Best Talent (2015)

Mohamed Abbassi (born 28 March 1991) is a Tunisian basketball player who plays for US Monastir of the Tunisian Championnat National A and the Basketball Africa League (BAL). He previously played for several other sides in Tunisia.

== Professional career ==
Abbassi played in the 2013 FIBA Africa Clubs Champions Cup where he averaged 8.3 points, 3.5 rebounds and 0.3 assists per game. He also played in the 2014 FIBA Africa Clubs Champions Cup where he averaged 15.2 points, 5.5 rebounds and 0.8 assists per game. He also played in the 2014 Fiba Africa Champions Cup, he was part of the team that defeated the Angolan side C.D. Primeiro de Agosto 86–82 in the Final to win the Championship. In 2015, he participated in the 2015 FIBA Africa Cup for Men's Club Competition where he averaged 15.6 points, 3.6 rebounds and 0.4 assists per game. He also participated in the 2018–19 Africa Basketball League with the Tunisian side ES Radès where he averaged 6 points, 2.5 rebounds and 1 assist per game.

In the 2020–21 season, Abbassi played for Ezzahra Sports.

Since 2021, he is on the roster of US Monastir. On 28 May 2022, Abbassi won the 2022 BAL championship with the club.

== National team career ==
Abbassi played at the 2015 Afrobasket championship with the Tunisia national basketball team where he averaged 3 points and 1.2 rebounds per game. He participated in the 2016 FIBA World Olympic Qualifying Tournament in Turin, Italy. He also represented the Tunisia national basketball team at the 2019 FIBA Basketball World Cup in China where he averaged 1 point, 1 rebound and 1 assist per game.
