= Javi Balboa =

Equatoguinean footballer (born 1985)

Javier Balboa
Personal information
- Full name: Javier Ángel Balboa Osa
- Date of birth: 13 May 1985 (age 41)
- Place of birth: Madrid, Spain
- Height: 1.82 m (6 ft 0 in)
- Position: Winger

Youth career
- 1992–1996: CD Avance
- 1996–1999: Alcalá
- 1999–2004: Real Madrid

Senior career*
Years	Team	Apps	(Gls)
2004–2005	Real Madrid C	34	(1)
2005–2006	Real Madrid B	32	(1)
2006–2008	Real Madrid	7	(0)
2006–2007	→ Racing Santander (loan)	30	(1)
2008–2011	Benfica	10	(0)
2010	→ Cartagena (loan)	11	(0)
2011	→ Albacete (loan)	7	(0)
2011–2013	Beira-Mar	46	(8)
2013–2015	Estoril	41	(5)
2015–2016	Al-Faisaly	24	(8)
2016–2017	Chabab Rif	7	(2)
2017	Trikala	15	(2)
Total		264	(28)

International career
2007–2017	Equatorial Guinea	32	(5)
- * Club domestic league appearances and goals

Javier Ángel Balboa Osa (born 13 May 1985) is a former professional footballer who played as a winger, most notably for Real Madrid and Benfica.

After emerging at Real Madrid's youth system, he could never establish himself in its first team. In 2008 he signed with Benfica, being loaned several times over his contract and leaving three years later.

Born and raised in Spain to Equatorial Guinean parents, Balboa capped for the Equatorial Guinea national team at the 2012 and 2015 Africa Cup of Nations.

== Club career ==
=== Real Madrid ===
Born in Madrid, Balboa arrived at Real Madrid Castilla in the summer of 2005. He eventually settled down, although he missed a part of their season due to first team duty; he still finished his first year with 32 games and one goal, in Segunda División.

After having toured with the Real Madrid first team in its Austrian tour during the 2006–07 pre-season, Balboa signed a one-year loan deal with Racing de Santander in La Liga in order to gain first team experience, after being told he was not going to be part of the former's plans by manager Fabio Capello. He was an integral part of the Cantabrian side for the season's duration, scoring in a 2–1 win at RCD Mallorca in the 88th minute, on 16 December 2006.

Balboa was praised by Capello's replacement, Bernd Schuster, upon his return from loan, and his contract was extended until 2011. During the 2007 pre-season he was played as a right and left winger, and did well in several games, scoring against Lokomotiv Moscow.

Balboa came on in the second half of the UEFA Champions League home match against Olympiacos on 24 October 2007 and, during injury time, scored his first goal in the competition and for Real after being set up by Robinho, in a 4–2 group stage home win. On 19 December, he scored his first goal in the Copa del Rey, in a 1–1 draw against Alicante in the fourth round. The previous month, he had come to blows with teammate Pepe during a training session; he was not called up for Real Madrid's next match, while the Portuguese was.

=== Benfica ===
On 25 June 2008, Balboa signed a four-year deal with Benfica for €4 million, as the Portuguese club was managed by Quique Sánchez Flores. He made 17 competitive appearances in his first season, being ousted from the squad in the second following a wages dispute.

On 28 January 2010, Balboa was loaned to FC Cartagena in the second level until the end of the campaign. Returning to Benfica, he found himself limited to training with the first team, and subsequently joined Albacete Balompié on a five-month loan.

=== Beira-Mar ===
On 13 August 2011, Balboa terminated his contract with Benfica. Two days later he signed with S.C. Beira-Mar also in Portugal's Primeira Liga, leaving on 21 June 2013 after the Aveiro team's relegation.

=== Later years ===
On 16 September 2015, after two seasons with G.D. Estoril Praia, Balboa moved to Saudi Arabia after agreeing to a one-year deal with Al-Faisaly FC. On 25 January 2017 he moved clubs and countries again, joining Trikala F.C. in the Football League Greece.

== International career ==
Balboa made his debut with Equatorial Guinea on 2 June 2007, in a 0–2 loss to Rwanda for the 2008 Africa Cup of Nations qualifying stage. Also, he appeared in B games against the Region of Murcia and Extremadura in 2007, against Brittany on 2 June 2011 and against French side Issy-les-Moulineaux.

On 21 January 2012, Balboa scored the inaugural goal in the 2012 Africa Cup of Nations, the game's only as the co-hosts defeated Libya. In the 2015 edition of the tournament, also hosted by his country, he won a penalty after being fouled by Gabon's Lloyd Palun, and converted it to open a 2–0 win which put Equatorial Guinea into the quarter-finals. In the last-eight encounter, against Tunisia, he converted a late penalty to tie the game at 1–1 and eventually take it to extra time, where he scored a free kick to take his country to its first ever semi-final.

Balboa missed the first penalty in the shootout of the third-place playoff lost to the DR Congo, but with three goals was the tournament's joint top scorer alongside four other players.

== Personal life ==
Balboa came from a notable Equatorial Guinean family. His paternal great-grandfather, Abilio Balboa Arkins, of Cuban and Sierra Leone Creole descent, was mayor of Santa Isabel (renamed Malabo) during the 1960s. Balboa Arkins' sons were also footballers: Norberto (Javier's paternal grandfather), Armando – both were killed after participating in a failed coup d'état against Francisco Macías Nguema – and Abilio Jr., the most prominent of the three who played with his national team. Turn, a daughter of Armando, formed a family in Spain with the son of Domènec Balmanya, and they had a son, Israel Balmanya, who was a professional basketball player.

Balboa had another cousin Richard Nguema, a basketball player who played with, amongst others, Real Madrid and the Equatorial Guinea national team.

== Career statistics ==
=== Club ===
As of 12 May 2016

Appearances and goals by club, season and competition
Club	Season	League			Cup		Continental		Total	
Club	Season	Division	Apps	Goals	Apps	Goals	Apps	Goals	Apps	Goals
Real Madrid B	2005–06	Segunda División	32	1	—		—		32	1
Real Madrid	2005–06	La Liga	2	0	1	0	1 (Note: Appearances in UEFA Champions League)	0	4	0
Real Madrid	2007–08	La Liga	5	0	4 (Note: Includes one appearance in Supercopa de España)	1	2	1	11	2
Real Madrid	Total		7	0	5	1	3	1	15	2
Racing Santander (loan)	2006–07	La Liga	30	1	2	0	—		32	1
Benfica	2008–09	Primeira Liga	10	0	4	0	3 (Note: Appearances in UEFA Cup)	0	17	0
Cartagena (loan)	2009–10	Segunda División	11	0	0	0	—		11	0
Albacete (loan)	2010–11	Segunda División	7	0	0	0	—		7	0
Beira-Mar	2011–12	Primeira Liga	25	3	2	0	—		27	3
Beira-Mar	2012–13	Primeira Liga	21	5	5	1	—		26	6
Beira-Mar	Total		46	8	7	1	—		53	9
Estoril	2013–14	Primeira Liga	28	4	6	1	7 (Note: Appearances in UEFA Europa League)	0	41	5
Estoril	2014–15	Primeira Liga	13	1	1	0	1	0	15	1
Estoril	Total		41	5	7	1	8	0	56	6
Al-Faisaly	2015–16	Saudi Professional League	24	8	0	0	—		24	8
Career total			203	23	25	3	14	1	247	27

=== International ===
As of 31 January 2015

Scores and results list Equatorial Guinea's goal tally first, score column indicates score after each Balboa goal.

List of international goals scored by Javier Balboa
No.	Date	Venue	Opponent	Score	Result	Competition
1	21 January 2012	Estadio de Bata, Bata, Equatorial Guinea	Libya	1–0	1–0	2012 Africa Cup of Nations
2	25 January 2015	Estadio de Bata, Bata, Equatorial Guinea	Gabon	1–0	2–0	2015 Africa Cup of Nations
3	31 January 2015	Estadio de Bata, Bata, Equatorial Guinea	Tunisia	1–1	2–1	2015 Africa Cup of Nations
4	31 January 2015	Estadio de Bata, Bata, Equatorial Guinea	Tunisia	2–1	2–1	2015 Africa Cup of Nations

== Honours ==
Real Madrid

- La Liga: 2007–08
- Supercopa de España runner-up: 2007

Benfica

- Taça da Liga: 2008–09

Individual

- Africa Cup of Nations top scorer: 2015
