= 2013 FIBA Africa Clubs Champions Cup =

- Season: 2013
- Dates: 12–21 December 2013
- Games played: 53
- Teams: 12

Regular season
- Season MVP: (United States) Cedric Isom

Finals
- Champions: (Angola) 1º de Agosto (8th title)
- Runners-up: (Morocco) Étoile du Sahel
- Third place: (Angola) Recreativo do Libolo
- Fourth place: (Egypt) Sporting Alexandria

Statistical leaders
- Points: (United States) Abubakar Usman

The 2013 FIBA Africa Basketball Club Championship (28th edition), is an international basketball tournament held in Sousse, Tunisia from December 12 to 21, 2013. The tournament, organized by FIBA Africa and hosted by Étoile Sportive du Sahel was contested by 12 clubs split into 2 groups of six, the top four of which qualifying for the knock-out stage, quarter, semifinals and final.

Primeiro de Agosto from Angola was the winner.

== Draw ==
Group A	Group B
(Algeria) Club Sportif Constantinois (Tunisia) ES Sahel (Mozambique) Ferroviário da Beira (Liberia) LPRC Oilers (Egypt) Sporting Club Alexandria (Gabon) Tali Basket-ball	(Libya) Al-Ahly Benghazi (Nigeria) Kano Pillars (Equatorial Guinea) Malabo Kings (Angola) Primeiro de Agosto (Angola) Recreativo do Libolo (Burundi) Urunani

== Preliminary round ==
Times given below are in UTC+1.

=== Group A ===
Qualified for the quarter-finals

	Team	M	W	L	PF	PA	Diff	P
1.	(Tunisia) Étoile Sportive du Sahel	5	4	1	403	290	+113	9
2.	(Egypt) Sporting Club Alexandria	5	4	1	402	308	+94	9
3.	(Algeria) CS Constantine	5	4	1	356	321	+35	9
4.	(Gabon) Tali BB	5	2	3	331	386	-55	7
5.	(Mozambique) Ferroviário da Beira	5	1	4	322	370	−48	6
6.	(Liberia) LPRC Oilers	5	0	5	306	445	−139	5

December 12, 2013
11:00

Boxscore

Fer da Beira (Mozambique)	49–75	(Egypt) Sporting
Scoring by quarter: 13-19, 13-15, 7-17, 16-24
Pts: Baptista 10; Rebs: Davis 8 Asts: Amarildo 3		Pts: Braa, Abdel-bary 12; Rebs: Braa 12; Asts: Khedr 3

Salle Olympique de Sousse

December 12, 2013
13:00

Boxscore

Constantine (Algeria)	84–64	(Liberia) LPRC Oilers
Scoring by quarter: 23-13, 16-21, 28-22, 17-8
Pts: Saadallah 28; Rebs: Oukid 15; Asts: Kaouane 11		Pts: Davidson 13; Rebs: Davidson 12; Asts: Dixon 4

Salle Olympique de Sousse

December 12, 2013
18:00

Boxscore

ES Sahel (Tunisia)	86–57	(Gabon) Tali BB
Scoring by quarter: 19-13, 15-16, 25-12, 27-16
Pts: three players 14; Rebs: Bagarić 11; Asts: Mouhli 8		Pts: Mvé, Shamba 12; Rebs: Mvé 7 Asts: Shamba 2

Salle Olympique de Sousse

December 13, 2013
12:00

Boxscore

Tali BB (Gabon)	56–90	(Egypt) Sporting
Scoring by quarter: 10-22, 19-22, 13-28, 14-18
Pts: Bouli 14; Rebs: Reteno, Fabre 7 Asts: Reteno, Shamba 2		Pts: Braa 19; Rebs: Braa 15; Asts: three players 3

Salle Olympique de Sousse

December 13, 2013
14:00

Boxscore

Constantine (Algeria)	66–61	(Mozambique) Fer da Beira
Scoring by quarter: 20-18, 16-20, 18-4, 12-19
Pts: Wells 21; Rebs: Zerouali 11; Asts: Kaouane 7		Pts: Bell, Velasco 13; Rebs: Bell 10; Asts: Ismael 5

Salle Olympique de Sousse

December 13, 2013
18:00

Boxscore

ES Sahel (Tunisia)	91–49	(Liberia) LPRC Oilers
Scoring by quarter: 18-12, 25-7, 28-12, 20-18
Pts: Chennoufi 18; Rebs: Chennoufi, Toumi 7 Asts: Bridgewater 6		Pts: Mbaimba 12; Rebs: Mbaimba, Lee 5 Asts: three players 2

Salle Olympique de Sousse

December 14, 2013
10:00

Boxscore

Tali BB (Gabon)	60–76	(Algeria) Constantine
Scoring by quarter: 9-20, 9-24, 24-15, 18-17
Pts: Mvé, Shamba 17; Rebs: Mvé 9 Asts: Mvé 3		Pts: Oukid 18; Rebs: Wells 13; Asts: Kaouane 11

Salle Olympique de Sousse

December 14, 2013
12:00

Boxscore

LPRC Oilers (Liberia)	67–86	(Mozambique) Fer da Beira
Scoring by quarter: 17-21, 14-16, 14-28, 22-21
Pts: Teah 19; Rebs: Camara 6 Asts: Lee 4		Pts: Magoliço 21; Rebs: Bell 13; Asts: Velasco 5

Salle Olympique de Sousse

December 14, 2013
18:00

Boxscore

Sporting (Egypt)	70–69	(Tunisia) ES Sahel
Scoring by quarter: 20-19, 23-19, 14-13, 13-18
Pts: Braa 15; Rebs: Khedr 7 Asts: Khedr 4		Pts: Chennoufi 16; Rebs: Bagarić, Rzig 8 Asts: Mouhli 5

Salle Olympique de Sousse

December 16, 2013
10:00

[ Boxscore]

LPRC Oilers (Liberia)	61–83	(Gabon) Tali BB
Scoring by quarter: 19-24, 10-29, 8-17, 24-13
Pts: n/a Rebs: n/a Asts: n/a		Pts: n/a Rebs: n/a Asts: n/a

Salle Olympique de Sousse

December 16, 2013
14:00

Boxscore

Sporting (Egypt)	66–69	(Algeria) Constantine
Scoring by quarter: 17-18, 17-16, 18-15, 14-20
Pts: Abdel-bary 15; Rebs: Felix 8 Asts: Abdel-bary 3		Pts: Wells 17; Rebs: Oukid 9 Asts: Kaouane 8

Salle Olympique de Sousse

December 16, 2013
18:00

Boxscore

ES Sahel (Tunisia)	87–53	(Mozambique) Fer da Beira
Scoring by quarter: 20-13, 16-13, 19-15, 32-12
Pts: Mouhli 19; Rebs: Bagarić 7 Asts: Lahmar 6		Pts: Baptista 13; Rebs: Bell 9 Asts: Amarildo 2

Salle Olympique de Sousse

December 17, 2013
10:00

Boxscore

Sporting (Egypt)	101–65	(Liberia) LPRC Oilers
Scoring by quarter: 24-11, 24-16, 30-22, 23-16
Pts: Alian 16; Rebs: Ahmed 8 Asts: Tawfik 6		Pts: Davidson 14; Rebs: Mbaimba 8 Asts: Mbaimba 3

Salle Olympique de Sousse

December 17, 2013
12:00

Boxscore

Fer da Beira (Mozambique)	73–75	(Gabon) Tali BB
Scoring by quarter: 17-19, 20-19, 17-16, 19-21
Pts: A.Matos 20; Rebs: Bell 11; Asts: Amarildo, Ismael 3		Pts: Shamba 24; Rebs: Mvé 12; Asts: three players 2

Salle Olympique de Sousse

December 17, 2013
18:00

Boxscore

Constantine (Algeria)	61–70	(Tunisia) ES Sahel
Scoring by quarter: 12-10, 15-19, 14-28, 20-13
Pts: Wells 16; Rebs: Zerouali 12; Asts: Kaouane 6		Pts: Rzig 20; Rebs: Rzig 7 Asts: Mouhli 4

Salle Olympique de Sousse

=== Group B ===
Qualified for the quarter-finals

	Team	M	W	L	PF	PA	Diff	P
1.	(Angola) Primeiro de Agosto	5	4	1	420	310	+110	9
2.	(Angola) Recreativo do Libolo	5	4	1	420	307	+113	9
3.	(Libya) Al-Ahly Benghazi	5	3	2	391	413	-22	8
4.	(Equatorial Guinea) Malabo Kings	5	2	3	381	359	+22	7
5.	(Nigeria) Kano Pillars	5	2	3	382	380	+2	7
6.	(Burundi) Urunani	5	0	5	248	473	-225	5

December 12, 2013
15:00

Boxscore

Al-Ahly (Libya)	92–76	(Equatorial Guinea) Malabo Kings
Scoring by quarter: 18-25, 22-17, 41-17, 11-17
Pts: Winder 34; Rebs: Cox 10; Asts: Winder 6		Pts: Ngomo, Nguema 12; Rebs: Obiang 7 Asts: Nguema 4

Salle Olympique de Sousse

December 12, 2013
20:00

Boxscore

1º de Agosto (Angola)	78–66	(Angola) Rec do Libolo
Scoring by quarter: 19-17, 22-21, 25-12, 12-16
Pts: Kikas, Isom 22; Rebs: Mutu 11; Asts: Armando 5		Pts: Olímpio 16; Rebs: Olímpio, Sonko 7 Asts: L.Costa, Bráulio 3

Salle Olympique de Sousse

December 15, 2013
10:00

Boxscore

Urunani (Burundi)	38–72	(Nigeria) Kano Pillars
Scoring by quarter: 13-21, 6-17, 7-20, 12-14
Pts: Hakizimana 11; Rebs: Ndikumana 11; Asts: Ndikumana 2		Pts: Ademola 17; Rebs: Yahaya 13; Asts: three players 3

Salle Olympique de Sousse

December 13, 2013
10:00

Boxscore

Urunani (Burundi)	54–83	(Libya) Al-Ahly
Scoring by quarter: 16-18, 14-19, 12-18, 12-28
Pts: Ndikumana 14; Rebs: Niagunduka 11; Asts: Nikobahoze 4		Pts: Winder 24; Rebs: Cox 8 Asts: Winder 7

Salle Olympique de Sousse

December 13, 2013
16:00

Boxscore

Rec do Libolo (Angola)	67–59	(Equatorial Guinea) Malabo Kings
Scoring by quarter: 20-18, 15-13, 18-19, 14-9
Pts: Coleman 19; Rebs: Coleman, Sonko 12; Asts: Mingas 6		Pts: Nguema 14; Rebs: Sonseca, Obiang 13; Asts: Sonseca, Nguema 3

Salle Olympique de Sousse

December 13, 2013
20:00

Boxscore

1º de Agosto (Angola)	73–75	(Nigeria) Kano Pillars
Scoring by quarter: 15-11, 22-22, 13-22, 23-20
Pts: Mutu 16; Rebs: Kikas, Miller 7 Asts: Armando 8		Pts: Usman 16; Rebs: Okeke 10; Asts: three players 2

Salle Olympique de Sousse

December 14, 2013
14:00

Boxscore

Rec do Libolo (Angola)	120–48	(Burundi) Urunani
Scoring by quarter: 18-21, 33-11, 31-9, 38-7
Pts: Bráulio 21; Rebs: Coleman 16; Asts: Abraão 6		Pts: Hakizimana 24; Rebs: Ndikumana 9 Asts: Nijimbere 3

Salle Olympique de Sousse

December 14, 2013
16:00

Boxscore

Kano Pillars (Nigeria)	93–98	(Libya) Al-Ahly
Scoring by quarter: 24-25, 28-25, 22-13, 19-35
Pts: Usman 42; Rebs: Ademola, Onmonya 7 Asts: Usman 4		Pts: Cox 29; Rebs: Cox 11; Asts: Winder 9

Salle Olympique de Sousse

December 14, 2013
20:00

Boxscore

Malabo Kings (Equatorial Guinea)	58–65	(Angola) 1º de Agosto
Scoring by quarter: 19-19, 16-17, 6-17, 17-12
Pts: Nguema 17; Rebs: Sonseca 9 Asts: three players 1		Pts: Correia 21; Rebs: Kikas 10; Asts: Isom 4

Salle Olympique de Sousse

December 16, 2013
12:00

Boxscore

Malabo Kings (Equatorial Guinea)	97–50	(Burundi) Urunani
Scoring by quarter: 27-13, 21-14, 29-11, 20-12
Pts: Ngomo 20; Rebs: Diarra 15; Asts: Mba 8		Pts: Ndayizeye 9 Rebs: Ndikumana 7 Asts: Niagunduka 4

Salle Olympique de Sousse

December 16, 2013
16:00

Boxscore

1º de Agosto (Angola)	103–53	(Libya) Al-Ahly
Scoring by quarter: 22-6, 25-9, 25-15, 31-23
Pts: Lucas 21; Rebs: Miller 9 Asts: Lucas, Miller 4		Pts: Cox 20; Rebs: Cox 5 Asts: K.Mohamed 2

Salle Olympique de Sousse

December 16, 2013
20:00

Boxscore

Kano Pillars (Nigeria)	57–80	(Angola) Rec do Libolo
Scoring by quarter: 12-26, 11-22, 18-18, 16-14
Pts: Ekpermong 13; Rebs: Yahaya 6 Asts: Yusuf 3		Pts: Sonko 14; Rebs: Mingas 10; Asts: Sousa 5

Salle Olympique de Sousse

December 17, 2013
14:00

Boxscore

Urunani (Burundi)	58–101	(Angola) 1º de Agosto
Scoring by quarter: 24-28, 6-17, 15-34, 13-22
Pts: Nijimbere 29; Rebs: Niagunduka 10; Asts: Nikobahoze 5		Pts: Ndoniema 21; Rebs: Miller, Kikas 10; Asts: Armando 7

Salle Olympique de Sousse

December 17, 2013
16:00

[ Boxscore]

Al-Ahly (Libya)	65–87	(Angola) Rec do Libolo
Scoring by quarter: 14-28, 27-11, 16-26, 8-22
Pts: K.Mohamed 22; Rebs: Cox 13; Asts: A.Mohamed 2		Pts: Mingas 27; Rebs: Coleman 14; Asts: Coleman 4

Salle Olympique de Sousse

December 17, 2013
20:00

Boxscore

Malabo Kings (Equatorial Guinea)	91–85	(Nigeria) Kano Pillars
Scoring by quarter: 34-16, 15-24, 27-22, 15-23
Pts: Sonseca 24; Rebs: Sonseca 10; Asts: Noha, Nguema 4		Pts: Ademola 20; Rebs: Ekpermong 5 Asts: Usman 3

Salle Olympique de Sousse

== Knockout round ==
9th-12th Place
Thursday 19 December 10:00
(Burundi) Urunani	62
(Mozambique) Fer da Beira	68
Thursday 19 December 12:00
(Liberia) LPRC Oilers	59
(Nigeria) Kano Pillars	89

9th place
Friday 20 December 12:00
(Nigeria) Kano Pillars	91
(Nigeria) Fer da Beira	79
11th place
Friday 20 December 10:00
(Liberia) LPRC Oilers	61
(Burundi) Urunani	69

Quarter-finals
Thursday 19 December – 14:00
(Gabon) Tali BB	44
(Angola) 1º de Agosto	101
Thursday 19 December – 16:00
(Libya) Al-Ahly	86
(Egypt) Sporting	90
Thursday 19 December – 18:00
(Equatorial Guinea) Malabo Kings	66
(Tunisia) ES Sahel	70
Thursday 19 December – 20:00
(Algeria) Constantine	58
(Angola) Rec do Libolo	81

5th-8th Place
Friday 20 December 16:00
(Gabon) Tali BB	93
(Libya) Al-Ahly	58
Friday 20 December 14:00
(Equatorial Guinea) Malabo Kings	78
(Algeria) Constantine	82

5th place
Saturday 21 December 12:30
(Gabon) Tali BB	58
(Algeria) Constantine	74
7th place
Saturday 21 December 10:30
(Libya) Al-Ahly	51
(Equatorial Guinea) Malabo Kings	63

Quarter-finals
Thursday 19 December – 14:00
(Gabon) Tali BB	44
(Angola) 1º de Agosto	101
Thursday 19 December – 16:00
(Libya) Al-Ahly	86
(Egypt) Sporting	90
Thursday 19 December – 18:00
(Equatorial Guinea) Malabo Kings	66
(Tunisia) ES Sahel	70
Thursday 19 December – 20:00
(Algeria) Constantine	58
(Angola) Rec do Libolo	81

Semi-finals
Friday 20 December 20:00
(Angola) 1º de Agosto	74
(Egypt) Sporting	68
Friday 20 December 18:00
(Tunisia) ES Sahel	67
(Angola) Rec do Libolo	63

Final
Saturday 21 December 17:00
(Angola) 1º de Agosto	68
(Tunisia) ES Sahel	61
3rd place
Saturday 21 December 14:30
(Egypt) Sporting	70
(Angola) Rec do Libolo	79

=== 9th-12th place ===
December 19, 2013
10:00

[ Boxscore]

Urunani (Burundi)	62–68	(Mozambique) Fer da Beira
Scoring by quarter: 20-22, 10-8, 15-21, 17-17
Pts: n/a Rebs: n/a Asts: n/a		Pts: n/a Rebs: n/a Asts: n/a

Salle Olympique de Sousse

December 19, 2013
12:00

Boxscore

LPRC Oilers (Liberia)	59–89	(Nigeria) Kano Pillars
Scoring by quarter: 19-30, 8-17, 13-17, 19-25
Pts: Davidson 11; Rebs: Davidson 8 Asts: Davidson 5		Pts: Usman 31; Rebs: Yahaya, Okeke 7 Asts: four players 3

Salle Olympique de Sousse

=== Quarter-finals ===
December 19, 2013
14:00

Boxscore

Tali BB (Gabon)	44–101	(Angola) 1º de Agosto
Scoring by quarter: 6-33, 17-21, 6-22
Pts: Shamba 9 Rebs: Mvé 9 Asts: Shamba, Edouba 1		Pts: Machado, Miller 17; Rebs: Machado 12; Asts: Armando 5

Salle Olympique de Sousse

December 19, 2013
16:00

Boxscore

Al-Ahly (Libya)	86–90	(Egypt) Sporting
Scoring by quarter: 30-26, 25-21, 14-26, 17-17
Pts: Winder 29; Rebs: Cox 11; Asts: Winder 5		Pts: Braa 26; Rebs: Braa 12; Asts: Khedr, Elkerdany 3

Salle Olympique de Sousse

December 19, 2013
18:00

Boxscore

Malabo Kings (Equatorial Guinea)	66–70	(Tunisia) ES Sahel
Scoring by quarter: 18-19, 17-15, 18-12, 13-24
Pts: Nguema 20; Rebs: Obiang 8 Asts: Nguema 4		Pts: Kechrid 13; Rebs: Bagarić 11; Asts: Nadderi, Rzig 2

Salle Olympique de Sousse

December 19, 2013
20:00

Boxscore

Constantine (Algeria)	58–81	(Angola) Rec do Libolo
Scoring by quarter: 10-23, 12-20, 23-21, 13-17
Pts: Wells 24; Rebs: Wells, Oukid 6 Asts: Kaouane 5		Pts: Mingas 14; Rebs: Mingas, Coleman 9 Asts: Morais 3

Salle Olympique de Sousse

=== 11th place ===
December 20, 2013
10:00

Boxscore

LPRC Oilers (Liberia)	61–69	(Burundi) Urunani
Scoring by quarter: 14-18, 11-10, 16-24, 20-17
Pts: Bing 16; Rebs: Bing, Camara 5 Asts: Mbaimba 1		Pts: Ndikumana 22; Rebs: Niagunduka 6 Asts: Higwa 2

Salle Olympique de Sousse

=== 9th place ===
December 20, 2013
12:00

Boxscore

Kano Pillars (Nigeria)	91–79	(Mozambique) Fer da Beira
Scoring by quarter: 16-12, 22-19, 19-23, 34-25
Pts: Usman 29; Rebs: Yahaya 10; Asts: Yusuf 6		Pts: Bell 19; Rebs: three players 6 Asts: Amarildo 6

Salle Olympique de Sousse

=== 5th-8th place ===
December 20, 2013
14:00

Boxscore

Malabo Kings (Equatorial Guinea)	78–82	(Algeria) Constantine
Scoring by quarter: 18-17, 20-16, 23-24, 17-25
Pts: three players 15; Rebs: Sonseca 9 Asts: Sonseca, Mba 4		Pts: Little 26; Rebs: Wells 7 Asts: Wells, Kaouane 5

Salle Olympique de Sousse

December 20, 2013
16:00

Boxscore

Tali BB (Gabon)	93–58	(Libya) Al-Ahly
Scoring by quarter: 21-20, 34-17, 28-15, 10-6
Pts: Shamba 35; Rebs: Abbesolo 7 Asts: Shamba 4		Pts: Winder, Cox 15; Rebs: Winder 6 Asts: Makraz 3

Salle Olympique de Sousse

=== Semifinals ===
December 20, 2013
18:00

Boxscore

ES Sahel (Tunisia)	67–63	(Angola) Rec do Libolo
Scoring by quarter: 13-23, 20-21, 16-12, 18-7
Pts: Abbasi 22; Rebs: Rzig 6 Asts: Kechrid 5		Pts: Olímpio 16; Rebs: Mingas 12; Asts: Morais 5

Salle Olympique de Sousse

December 20, 2013
20:00

Boxscore

1º de Agosto (Angola)	74–68	(Egypt) Sporting
Scoring by quarter: 21-20, 13-11, 19-17, 21-20
Pts: Isom 16; Rebs: Miller 8 Asts: Armando 9		Pts: Braa 23; Rebs: Braa 11; Asts: Braa, Elkerdany 2

Salle Olympique de Sousse

=== 7th place ===
December 21, 2013
10:30

Boxscore

Malabo Kings (Equatorial Guinea)	63–51	(Libya) Al-Ahly
Scoring by quarter: 22-17, 15-16, 14-11, 12-7
Pts: Sonseca 16; Rebs: Sonseca 12; Asts: Mba 5		Pts: Cox 16; Rebs: Cox 10; Asts: Winder 5

Salle Olympique de Sousse

=== 5th place ===
December 21, 2013
12:30

Boxscore

Constantine (Algeria)	74–58	(Gabon) Tali BB
Scoring by quarter: 19-19, 20-4, 23-15, 12-20
Pts: Zerouali 23; Rebs: Wells 13; Asts: Wells 5		Pts: Shamba 19; Rebs: Mydiambo 5 Asts: Edouba 2

Salle Olympique de Sousse

=== Bronze-medal game ===
December 21, 2013
14:30

Boxscore

Rec do Libolo (Angola)	79–70	(Egypt) Sporting
Scoring by quarter: 19-25, 13-16, 21-15, 26-14
Pts: Coleman 25; Rebs: Mingas 15; Asts: Olímpio 7		Pts: Shousha 15; Rebs: Felix 5 Asts: three players 1

Salle Olympique de Sousse

=== Gold-medal game ===
December 21, 2013
17:00

Boxscore

ES Sahel (Tunisia)	61–68	(Angola) 1º de Agosto
Scoring by quarter: 14-14, 9-15, 17-23, 21-16
Pts: Bridgewater 15; Rebs: Maoua 8 Asts: Bridgewater 5		Pts: Isom 35; Rebs: Isom 11; Asts: three players 2

Salle Olympique de Sousse

== Final standings ==
Rank	Team	Record
Gold medal	(Angola) Primeiro de Agosto	7–1
Silver medal	(Tunisia) ES Sahel	6–2
Bronze medal	(Angola) Recreativo do Libolo	6–2
4	(Egypt) Sporting Alexandria	5–3
5	(Algeria) CS Constantine	6–2
6	(Gabon) Tali BB	3–5
7	(Equatorial Guinea) Malabo Kings	3–5
8	(Libya) Al-Ahly	3–5
9	(Nigeria) Kano Pillars	4–3
10	(Mozambique) Fer da Beira	2–5
11	(Burundi) Urunani	1–6
12	(Liberia) LPRC Oilers	0–7

Primeiro de Agosto roster
Agostinho Coelho, Armando Costa, Cedric Isom, Edmir Lucas, Edson Ndoniema, Felizardo Ambrósio, Francisco Machado, Hermenegildo Santos, Islando Manuel, Joaquim Gomes, Mário Correia, Mutu Fonseca, Coach: Paulo Macedo

== All Tournament Team ==
G	(United States)	Cedric Isom
F	(Tunisia)	Hamdi Braa
F	(Angola)	Eduardo Mingas
C	(Angola)	Joaquim Gomes
C	(United States)	Kevin Bridgewater

2013 FIBA Africa Clubs Champions Cup

Clube Desportivo Primeiro de Agosto
8th Title

Most Valuable Player
(United States) Cedric Isom

== See also ==
2013 FIBA Africa Championship
