= Richard Nguema =

Equatoguinean basketball player (born 1988)

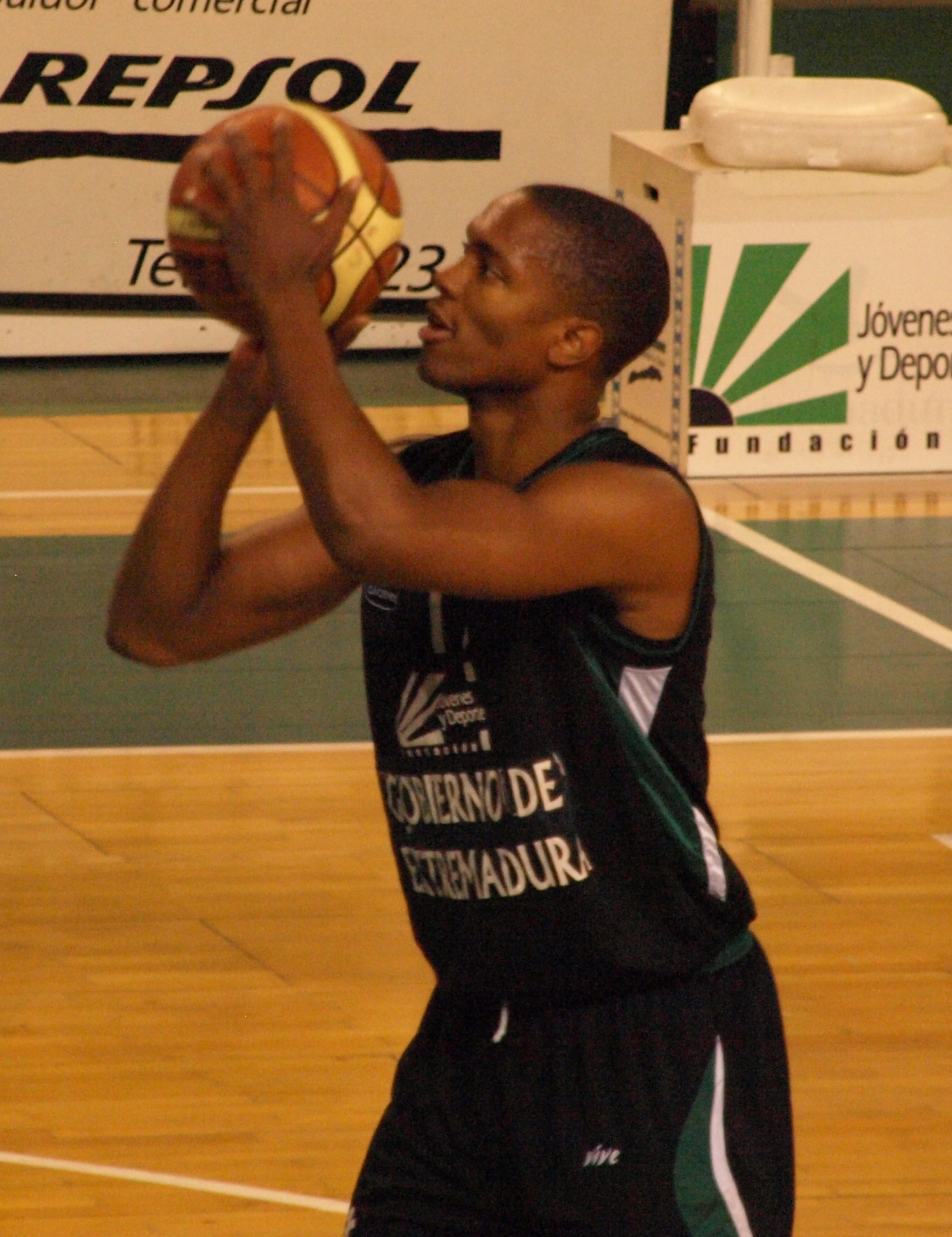
- Nguema in 2013

Personal information
- Born: 7 February 1988 (age 38) Madrid, Spain
- Listed height: 6 ft 4 in (1.93 m)

Career information
- NBA draft: 2005: undrafted
- Playing career: 2005–present
- Position: Point guard; Shooting guard
- Number: 17

Career history
- 2005–2008: Real Madrid
- 2008–2010: Estudiantes
- 2010–2012: Obradoiro CAB
- 2012–2013: Cáceres
- 2013–2015: Malabo Kings
- 2015: Cáceres
- 2016: The Panthers
- 2017: Cañeros del Este
Medals
Men's basketball
Representing Spain
FIBA Europe Under-18 Championship
Bronze medal – third place	2006 Greece	U-18 National Team

Richard Nguema Balboa (born 7 February 1988) is a professional basketball player who plays as a point guard and shooting guard. Born and raised in Spain to Equatorial Guinean parents, he represented Spain and Equatorial Guinea at youth and senior levels, respectively.

== Profile and personal life ==
He was born in Madrid, Spain to Equatorial Guinean parents - his father being a diplomat. As a result, he has dual citizenship with Spain and Equatorial Guinea. His maternal side, the Balboa, is of distant Cuban descent.

He has a cousin on his mother's side, Javier Balboa, who is a professional footballer, Equatorial Guinea's international player, also born in Madrid.

== Professional career ==
Nguema has played with several different Spanish clubs in the past, most notably starting his career with Real Madrid, where he obtained the 2006–07 ULEB Cup and the 2006–07 ACB season. Later, he played for CB Estudiantes, Obradoiro CAB and Cáceres Ciudad del Baloncesto.

He also played in Equatorial Guinea, the original country of his family, for Malabo Kings and The Panthers, and in 2017 he played for Cañeros del Este of Dominican top division Liga Nacional de Baloncesto.

== National team career ==
Nguema has competed for Spain through multiple junior national teams, and helped the team win the bronze medal at the 2006 FIBA Europe Under-18 Championship.

He also participated at the 2007 FIBA Under-19 World Championship.

== Trophies and awards ==
=== Real Madrid ===
- 2006–07 ULEB Cup: Champion
- 2006–07 ACB season: Champion

=== Obradoiro CAB ===
- 2010-11 LEB Oro: Champion
- 2010-11 Prince Cup: Champion

=== Spanish national team ===
- 2006 FIBA Europe Under-18 Championship: Bronze
