= Steve Briggs =

English footballer

Personal information
- Full name: Stephen Briggs
- Date of birth: 2 December 1946 (age 79)
- Place of birth: Leeds, England
- Position: Centre forward

Youth career
- Leeds United

Senior career*
Years	Team	Apps	(Gls)
1965–1969	Leeds United	0	(0)
1969–1973	Doncaster Rovers	120	(34)
1973–1974	Yeovil Town		
- * Club domestic league appearances and goals

Steve Briggs (born 2 December 1946) is a former footballer who played for Doncaster Rovers and Yeovil Town as centre forward.

== Senior club career ==
=== Leeds United ===
Briggs signed for high flying 1st Division side Leeds United straight from school, though never managed to get beyond playing for the reserves.

=== Doncaster Rovers ===
He moved to English Division 4 club Doncaster Rovers in February 1969, scoring on his debut in a 7–0 victory over Aldershot on 23 February. He went on to play in all the subsequent 17 League games that season, and score 4 goals in what was Doncaster's title winning year as they gained promotion to Division 3.

The following season he made 31 League appearances, scoring 8 goals, occasionally being replaced by Laurie Sheffield. He also played in 3 cup games and scored in the League Cup against Blackburn of Division 2.

The 1970-71 season was less successful for Doncaster as they were relegated, though Briggs managed 10 goals in 31 League and Cup games, sometimes playing inside right and right wing.

After making a total of 127 League and Cup appearances, scoring 36 goals, it was at the end of the 1972–73 season that he was released on a free transfer with Yeovil Town picking him up.

=== Yeovil Town ===
Briggs was released after just one season as Yeovil finished 6th in the Southern League.

== Honours ==
Doncaster Rovers

- English Division 4 winner 1968–69
