= Malabo Kings =

Equatoguinean basketball club

- Nickname: Los Kings
- League: Equatorial Guinea Basketball League
- Founded: 2011
- History: Malabo Kings; 2011–present
- Location: Malabo, Equatorial Guinea
- President: Juan Mañé

Malabo Kings BC is an Equatorial Guinean basketball club based in Malabo. The team was founded in 2011 and has won the national title twice.

In its history, Malabo Kings has made three appearances in the FIBA Africa Club Champions Cup: in 2011, 2013 and 2014. During the 2014 season, the Kings were sanctioned by FIBA Africa for fraud with the identity of two players, and were given two technical losses.

== History ==
The Malabo Kings played their first game on February 25, 2011.

== Honours ==
Liga Nacional de Baloncesto

- Champions (2):

FIBA Africa Zone IV

- Champions (3): 2013

Copa de su Excalencia

- Winners (1):

== In African competitions ==
FIBA Africa Clubs Champions Cup (3 appearances)

2011 – 12th Place
2013 – 7th Place
2014 – Preliminary Round

BAL Qualifiers (1 appearance)

2022 – Withdrew
