= 2019 FIBA Basketball World Cup qualification (Africa) =

2019 FIBA Basketball World Cup
African Qualification

Tournament details
- Dates: 24 November 2017 – 24 February 2019
- Teams: 16

Official website
- African qualifiers website

The 2019 FIBA Basketball World Cup qualification for the FIBA Africa region, began in November 2017 and concluded in February 2019. The process determined the five African teams that would participate at the 2019 FIBA World Cup.

== Entrants ==
The 16 teams that qualified for AfroBasket 2017 earned a right to participate in the first round of the 2019 FIBA Basketball World Cup African qualifiers. Prior to the start of the campaign, South Africa withdrew from the qualification. They were replaced by Chad, runner-up from the AfroBasket 2017 qualifying tournament.

- Angola
- Cameroon
- Central African Republic
- Chad
- DR Congo
- Egypt
- Guinea
- Ivory Coast
- Mali
- Morocco
- Mozambique
- Nigeria
- Rwanda
- Senegal
- Tunisia
- Uganda

== Schedule ==
The chart below was the schedule for the African qualifiers.

Stage	Matchday	Dates
First round	Matchday 1	24 November 2017 (A, C), 23 February 2018 (B, D)
First round	Matchday 2	25 November 2017 (A, C), 24 February 2018 (B, D)
First round	Matchday 3	26 November 2017 (A, C), 25 February 2018 (B, D)
First round	Matchday 4	29 June 2018
First round	Matchday 5	30 June 2018
First round	Matchday 6	1 July 2018
Second round	Matchday 1	14 September 2018
Second round	Matchday 2	15 September 2018
Second round	Matchday 3	16 September 2018
Second round	Matchday 4	30 November 2018 (E), 22 February 2019 (F)
Second round	Matchday 5	1 December 2018 (E), 23 February 2019 (F)
Second round	Matchday 6	2 December 2018 (E), 24 February 2019 (F)

== First round ==
All times are local.

=== Group A ===
Pos	Team	Pld	W	L	PF	PA	PD	Pts	Qualification
1	Tunisia	6	6	0	499	315	+184	12	Second round
2	Cameroon	6	4	2	438	381	+57	10	Second round
3	Chad	6	2	4	383	424	−41	8	Second round
4	Guinea	6	0	6	336	536	−200	6	

Source: FIBA
Rules for classification: 1) Points; 2) Head-to-head results; 3) Points difference; 4) Points scored.

24 November 2017	Guinea	56–96	Tunisia	Yaoundé
18:00	Scoring by quarter: 18–27, 11–20, 10–29, 17–20
	Pts: Souaré 14; Rebs: G. Conde 6 Asts: Sylla 3	Boxcscore	Pts: Knioua 16; Rebs: Slimane 8 Asts: Knioua 6	Arena: Yaoundé Multipurpose Sports Complex; Referees: Tonton Banza (COD), Antonio Bernardo (ANG), Amr Aboollo (EGY)

24 November 2017	Chad	60–65	Cameroon	Yaoundé
20:30	Scoring by quarter: 13–17, 14–13, 24–16, 9–19
	Pts: Nakidjim 15; Rebs: Nakidjim 14; Asts: Allah-Asra, Ndilngar 4	Boxcscore	Pts: Nzeulie 20; Rebs: Kadji 12; Asts: Njoya 3	Arena: Yaoundé Multipurpose Sports Complex; Attendance: 1,500; Referees: Samir Abaakil (MAR), Hassane Kamaté (CIV), Wael Mostafa (EGY)

25 November 2017	Tunisia	101–40	Chad	Yaoundé
18:00	Scoring by quarter: 21–7, 23–12, 33–11, 24–11
	Pts: Chennoufi 15; Rebs: Ben Romdhane 9 Asts: Abada 6	Boxcscore	Pts: Koibe 17; Rebs: Nakidjim 8 Asts: Noubaramadji 4	Arena: Yaoundé Multipurpose Sports Complex; Attendance: 1,000; Referees: Antonio Bernardo (ANG), Wael Mostafa (EGY), Hassane Kamaté (CIV)

25 November 2017	Cameroon	116–78	Guinea	Yaoundé
20:30	Scoring by quarter: 28–22, 28–21, 31–17, 29–18
	Pts: Kadji 20; Rebs: Yangue 9 Asts: Pitard 5	Boxcscore	Pts: Sylla 16; Rebs: Youla 5 Asts: Sylla 4	Arena: Yaoundé Multipurpose Sports Complex; Attendance: 1,000; Referees: Samir Abaakil (MAR), Amr Aboollo (EGY), Babacar Guèye (SEN)

26 November 2017	Guinea	51–85	Chad	Yaoundé
18:00	Scoring by quarter: 10–20, 13–16, 10–33, 18–16
	Pts: G. Conde, Sylla 12; Rebs: Sylla 9 Asts: Diallo 3	Boxcscore	Pts: Nato Kolmia 21; Rebs: Nakidjim 15; Asts: Noubaramadji 12	Arena: Yaoundé Multipurpose Sports Complex; Attendance: 1,000; Referees: Wael Mostafa (EGY), Tonton Banza (COD), Hassane Kamaté (CIV)

26 November 2017	Cameroon	66–67	Tunisia	Yaoundé
20:30	Scoring by quarter: 15–25, 13–11, 22–18, 16–13
	Pts: Narace 19; Rebs: Narace 10; Asts: Kadji 4	Boxcscore	Pts: Abada, Hdidane 15; Rebs: Ben Romdhane 9 Asts: Abada 4	Arena: Yaoundé Multipurpose Sports Complex; Attendance: 3,000; Referees: Antonio Bernardo (ANG), Amr Aboollo (EGY), Babacar Guèye(SEN)

29 June 2018	Cameroon	73–72	Chad	Radès
19:00	Scoring by quarter: 15–23, 21–16, 23–13, 14–20
	Pts: Songolo 19; Rebs: Adala 9 Asts: Ipouck, Nzeulie 2	Boxcscore	Pts: Koibe 24; Rebs: Nato Kolmia, Ndilngar 7 Asts: Ndilngar 6	Arena: Salle Omnisport de Radès; Referees: Mathurin N'Guessan (CIV), Babacar Gueye (SEN), Youssouf Maiga (MLI)

29 June 2018	Tunisia	94–54	Guinea	Radès
22:00	Scoring by quarter: 16–7, 23–15, 26–18, 29–14
	Pts: Slimane 19; Rebs: Lahiani 8 Asts: Abada 6	Boxcscore	Pts: Queta 22; Rebs: Queta 13; Asts: Sylla 3	Arena: Salle Omnisport de Radès; Referees: Amr Aboollo (EGY), Mart Uuehendrik (EST), Aboulaye Kamagate (CIV)

30 June 2018	Guinea	48–65	Cameroon	Radès
16:30	Scoring by quarter: 16–16, 17–7, 8–17, 7–25
	Pts: Souaré 12; Rebs: Sy 7 Asts: four players 2	Boxcscore	Pts: Mbala 16; Rebs: Ipouck 8 Asts: Songolo 4	Arena: Salle Omnisport de Radès; Referees: Amr Aboollo (EGY), Mart Uuehendrik (EST), Babacar Gueye (SEN)

30 June 2018	Chad	46–85	Tunisia	Radès
22:00	Scoring by quarter: 21–25, 8–18, 10–25, 7–17
	Pts: Ndilngar 15; Rebs: Nakidjim 11; Asts: Ndilngar 2	Boxcscore	Pts: Abada 23; Rebs: three players 6 Asts: Knioua 4	Arena: Salle Omnisport de Radès; Referees: Aboulaye Kamagate (CIV), Mathurin N'Guessan (CIV), Youssouf Maiga (MLI)

1 July 2018	Chad	80–49	Guinea	Radès
16:30	Scoring by quarter: 22–9, 14–17, 20–13, 24–10
	Pts: Nakidjim 23; Rebs: Koibe 12; Asts: Ndilngar 10	Boxcscore	Pts: Kaba 12; Rebs: Sy 6 Asts: Kaba 3	Arena: Salle Omnisport de Radès; Referees: Babacar Gueye (SEN), Aboulaye Kamagate (CIV), Youssouf Maiga (MLI)

1 July 2018	Tunisia	56–53	Cameroon	Radès
22:00	Scoring by quarter: 19–7, 17–15, 9–20, 11–11
	Pts: Ben Romdhane 20; Rebs: Ben Romdhane 7 Asts: Ben Romdhane 3	Boxcscore	Pts: Mbala 11; Rebs: Songolo Ngijol 5 Asts: Nzeulie 3	Arena: Salle Omnisport de Radès; Referees: Amr Abooloo (EGY), Mathurin N'Guessan (CIV), Mart Uuehendrik (EST)

=== Group B ===
Pos	Team	Pld	W	L	PF	PA	PD	Pts	Qualification
1	Nigeria	6	6	0	605	387	+218	12	Second round
2	Rwanda	6	3	3	434	519	−85	9	Second round
3	Mali	6	2	4	428	487	−59	8	Second round
4	Uganda	6	1	5	466	540	−74	7	

Source: FIBA
Rules for classification: 1) Points; 2) Head-to-head results; 3) Points difference; 4) Points scored.

23 February 2018	Uganda	86–102	Nigeria	Bamako
15:30	Scoring by quarter: 17–11, 29–36, 20–28, 20–27
	Pts: Enabu 27; Rebs: Sebirumbi 5 Asts: Opong 3	Boxscore	Pts: Efevberha 20; Rebs: Diogu 7 Asts: Uzoh 9	Arena: Palais des Sports Salamatou Maiga; Attendance: 2,300; Referees: Samir Abaakil (MAR), Aboulaye Kamagate (CIV), Saber Rezgui (TUN)

23 February 2018	Rwanda	74–70	Mali	Bamako
18:00	Scoring by quarter: 14–12, 17–17, 16–19, 27–22
	Pts: Gasana 16; Rebs: Kabangu 7 Asts: Mugabe 6	Boxscore	Pts: Djambo 21; Rebs: Ballo 14; Asts: Kanté 4	Arena: Palais des Sports Salamatou Maiga; Attendance: 5,000; Referees: Arnaud Njilo (CMR), Tarek Ben Ltaifa (TUN), Kouakou Niamien (CIV)

24 February 2018	Nigeria	108–53	Rwanda	Bamako
15:30	Scoring by quarter: 31–13, 24–15, 29–12, 24–13
	Pts: Efevberha 16; Rebs: Obepka 7 Asts: Uzoh 6	Boxscore	Pts: Kaje 15; Rebs: Kaje 5 Asts: Ruhezamihigo 2	Arena: Palais des Sports Salamatou Maiga; Attendance: 1,050; Referees: Arnaud Njilo (CMR), Tarek Ben Ltaifa (TUN), Babacar Gueye (SEN)

24 February 2018	Mali	79–76	Uganda	Bamako
18:00	Scoring by quarter: 17–12, 9–16, 24–23, 29–25
	Pts: Keita 22; Rebs: three players 8 Asts: Kanté 7	Boxscore	Pts: Opong 18; Rebs: Ocitti 10; Asts: Ocitti 4	Arena: Palais des Sports Salamatou Maiga; Attendance: 2,000; Referees: Samir Abaakil (MAR), Kouakou Niamien (CIV), Aboulaye Kamagate (CIV)

25 February 2018	Uganda	79–63	Rwanda	Bamako
15:30	Scoring by quarter: 28–16, 20–11, 15–19, 16–17
	Pts: Opong 20; Rebs: Opong 6 Asts: Enabu 4	Boxscore	Pts: Gasana 16; Rebs: Kaje 11; Asts: Gasana 3	Arena: Palais des Sports Salamatou Maiga; Attendance: 2,315; Referees: Tarek Ben Ltaifa (TUN), Babacar Gueye (SEN), Kouakou Niamien (CIV)

25 February 2018	Mali	59–82	Nigeria	Bamako
18:00	Scoring by quarter: 5–21, 16–16, 21–20, 17–25
	Pts: M. Diarra, Djambo 9 Rebs: Ballo 6 Asts: Balayera, Kanté 3	Boxscore	Pts: Diogu 22; Rebs: Obekpa 10; Asts: Efevberha 8	Arena: Palais des Sports Salamatou Maiga; Attendance: 2,000; Referees: Arnaud Njilo (CMR), Samir Abaakil (MAR), Saber Rezgui (TUN)

29 June 2018	Mali	72–82	Rwanda	Lagos
18:00	Scoring by quarter: 14–25, 19–19, 12–14, 27–24
	Pts: Djambo 16; Rebs: Djambo 13; Asts: Kanté 6	Boxscore	Pts: Gasana 23; Rebs: Kaje 10; Asts: three players 4	Arena: National Stadium; Referees: Antonio Bernardo (ANG), Wael Mostafa (EGY), Hassane Kamate (CIV)

29 June 2018	Nigeria	109–66	Uganda	Lagos
20:30	Scoring by quarter: 30–21, 21–14, 30–17, 28–14
	Pts: Diogu 24; Rebs: Nwora 10; Asts: Agada 6	Boxscore	Pts: Mayes 18; Rebs: Geu 12; Asts: Opong 3	Arena: National Stadium; Referees: Scott Beker (AUS), Kouakou Niamien (CIV), Tonton Banza (COD)

30 June 2018	Uganda	80–95	Mali	Lagos
18:00	Scoring by quarter: 15–18, 21–16, 25–34, 19–27
	Pts: Mayes, Opong 18; Rebs: Geu 12; Asts: Enabu 7	Boxscore	Pts: Kanté 21; Rebs: Djambo 7 Asts: Saounera 8	Arena: National Stadium; Referees: Scott Beker (AUS), Tonton Banza (COD), Sofiane Si Youcef (ALG)

30 June 2018	Rwanda	70–111	Nigeria	Lagos
20:30	Scoring by quarter: 24–28, 9–24, 9–30, 28–29
	Pts: Kaje 14; Rebs: Kaje 6 Asts: Mugabe 6	Boxscore	Pts: Emegano 24; Rebs: Zanna 11; Asts: Agada 4	Arena: National Stadium; Attendance: 200; Referees: Wael Mostafa (EGY), Antonio Bernardo (ANG), Kouakou Niamien (CIV)

1 July 2018	Rwanda	92–79	Uganda	Lagos
18:00	Scoring by quarter: 25–23, 18–17, 28–17, 21–22
	Pts: Gasana 20; Rebs: Garrett 15; Asts: Gasana 6	Boxscore	Pts: Opong 18; Rebs: Geu 10; Asts: Enabu 3	Arena: National Stadium; Attendance: 128; Referees: Wael Mostafa (EGY), Tonton Banza (COD), Kouakou Niamien (CIV)

1 July 2018	Nigeria	93–53	Mali	Lagos
20:30	Scoring by quarter: 22–15, 25–10, 24–19, 22–9
	Pts: Nwora 36; Rebs: six players 5 Asts: Uzoh 6	Boxscore	Pts: N. Diarra 13; Rebs: Djambo 5 Asts: Kante, Saounera 3	Arena: National Stadium; Referees: Antonio Bernardo (ANG), Hassane Kamate (CIV), Sofiane Si Youcef (ALG)

=== Group C ===
Pos	Team	Pld	W	L	PF	PA	PD	Pts	Qualification
1	Angola	6	4	2	371	369	+2	10	Second round
2	Egypt	6	3	3	376	387	−11	9 (Note: Egypt 2–0; Morocco 0–2)	Second round
3	Morocco	6	3	3	382	374	+8	9	Second round
4	DR Congo	6	2	4	407	406	+1	8	

Source: FIBA
Rules for classification: 1) Points; 2) Head-to-head results; 3) Points difference; 4) Points scored.
Notes:

24 November 2017	DR Congo	61–65(OT)	Egypt	Luanda
15:30	Scoring by quarter: 13–10, 9–20, 18–15, 15–10, Overtime: 6–10
	Pts: M. Munanga 19; Rebs: Manga 8 Asts: M. Munanga 3	Boxscore	Pts: Gunady 18; Rebs: Kamal 7 Asts: Gendy 6	Arena: Pavilhão Multiusos do Kilamba; Referees: Youssouf Maiga (MLI), Arnaud Kom (CMR), Saber Rezgui (TUN)

24 November 2017	Angola	62–56	Morocco	Luanda
18:00	Scoring by quarter: 18–18, 10–17, 19–12, 15–9
	Pts: Morais, Paulo 13; Rebs: Cipriano, Moreira 6 Asts: Morais 3	Boxscore	Pts: El-Makssoud 14; Rebs: Choua 7 Asts: three players 1	Arena: Pavilhão Multiusos do Kilamba; Referees: Mathurin N'Guessan (CIV), Tarek Ben Ltaifa (TUN), Mbaye Seye (SEN)

25 November 2017	Morocco	88–81(OT)	DR Congo	Luanda
15:30	Scoring by quarter: 19–22, 16–16, 23–13, 17–24, Overtime: 13–6
	Pts: Zouita 21; Rebs: El Makssoud 10; Asts: Lahrichi 6	Boxscore	Pts: M. Munanga 22; Rebs: Kabasele 9 Asts: M. Munanga 5	Arena: Pavilhão Multiusos do Kilamba; Referees: Mathurin N'Guessan (CIV), Saber Rezgui (TUN), Peter Kirabo (UGA)

25 November 2017	Egypt	64–68	Angola	Luanda
18:00	Scoring by quarter: 22–11, 13–19, 15–21, 14–17
	Pts: El-Gammal 18; Rebs: Oraby 15; Asts: three players 3	Boxscore	Pts: Moreira 14; Rebs: Moreira, Paulo 7 Asts: Domingos 4	Arena: Pavilhão Multiusos do Kilamba; Referees: Arnaud Kom (CMR), Tarek Ben Ltaifa (TUN), Youssouf Maïga (MLI)

26 November 2017	Morocco	63–67	Egypt	Luanda
15:30	Scoring by quarter: 17–16, 11–18, 14–18, 21–15
	Pts: El Makssoud 13; Rebs: Choua 10; Asts: Zouita 4	Boxscore	Pts: Gunady 14; Rebs: Gendy, El-Gammal 6 Asts: Gendy 6	Arena: Pavilhão Multiusos do Kilamba; Referees: Tarek Ben Ltaifa (TUN), Mbaye Seye (SEN), Peter Kirabo (UGA)

26 November 2017	DR Congo	64–73	Angola	Luanda
18:00	Scoring by quarter: 13–23, 19–12, 16–20, 16–18
	Pts: S. Munanga 14; Rebs: S. Munanga 9 Asts: M. Munanga 3	Boxscore	Pts: Moore 19; Rebs: Paulo 6 Asts: Paulo 5	Arena: Pavilhão Multiusos do Kilamba; Referees: Arnaud Kom (CMR), Mathurin N'Guessan (CIV), Youssouf Maïga(MLI)

29 June 2018	Morocco	61–47	Angola	Cairo
17:30	Scoring by quarter: 26–12, 8–10, 16–8, 11–17
	Pts: Kourodu, Lahrichi 10; Rebs: Najah 12; Asts: Lahrichi 4	Boxscore	Pts: Moreira 8 Rebs: Cipriano 8 Asts: Bastos, Cipriano 3	Arena: Cairo Stadium Indoor Halls Complex; Referees: Tarek Ben Ltaifa (TUN), Cherubin Leslie (MRI), Can Mavisu (TUR)

29 June 2018	Egypt	63–77	DR Congo	Cairo
20:00	Scoring by quarter: 24–23, 11–16, 15–15, 13–23
	Pts: Oraby 19; Rebs: Oraby 12; Asts: Mohamed 5	Boxscore	Pts: Shonganya 17; Rebs: Gudul 7 Asts: Eyenga 4	Arena: Cairo Stadium Indoor Halls Complex; Attendance: 1,500; Referees: Ognjen Jokić (MNE), Mbaye Seye (SEN), Abdelaziz Abassi (TUN)

30 June 2018	DR Congo	58–61(OT)	Morocco	Cairo
17:30	Scoring by quarter: 15–15, 14–12, 18–12, 4–12, Overtime: 7–10
	Pts: Eyenga 19; Rebs: Eyenga 12; Asts: Ono 4	Boxscore	Pts: El Makssoud 14; Rebs: Najah 13; Asts: Lahrichi 5	Arena: Cairo Stadium Indoor Halls Complex; Attendance: 500; Referees: Cherubin Leslie (MRI), Opeyemi Ogunleye (NGR), Abdelaziz Abassi (TUN)

30 June 2018	Angola	65–58	Egypt	Cairo
20:00	Scoring by quarter: 17–14, 11–14, 15–16, 22–14
	Pts: Goncalves 16; Rebs: three players 4 Asts: Domingos 7	Boxscore	Pts: Gendy 24; Rebs: Marei 8 Asts: Marei 3	Arena: Cairo Stadium Indoor Halls Complex; Attendance: 1,700; Referees: Ognjen Jokić (MNE), Tarek Ben Ltaifa (TUN), Mbaye Seye (SEN)

1 July 2018	Angola	56–66	DR Congo	Cairo
17:30	Scoring by quarter: 12–18, 12–17, 12–13, 20–18
	Pts: Moreira 20; Rebs: Moreira 10; Asts: Domingos 3	Boxscore	Pts: Eyenga 17; Rebs: Kasibabu 9 Asts: Eyenga, Shonganya 3	Arena: Cairo Stadium Indoor Halls Complex; Attendance: 1,500; Referees: Ognjen Jokić (MNE), Opeyemi Ogunleye (NGR), Tarek Ben Ltaifa (TUN)

1 July 2018	Egypt	59–53	Morocco	Cairo
20:00	Scoring by quarter: 17–11, 10–12, 18–15, 14–15
	Pts: Oraby 17; Rebs: Oraby 9 Asts: El-Gammal, Kamal 7	Boxscore	Pts: El Makssoud 18; Rebs: Najah 10; Asts: Lahrichi 6	Arena: Cairo Stadium Indoor Halls Complex; Attendance: 1,500; Referees: Mbaye Seye (SEN), Can Mavisu (TUR), Cherubin Leslie (MRI)

=== Group D ===
Pos	Team	Pld	W	L	PF	PA	PD	Pts	Qualification
1	Senegal	6	5	1	425	390	+35	11	Second round
2	Central African Republic	6	3	3	403	405	−2	9	Second round
3	Ivory Coast	6	2	4	365	369	−4	8 (Note: Ivory Coast 1–1, +4 PD; Mozambique 1–1, –4 PD)	Second round
4	Mozambique	6	2	4	348	377	−29	8	

Source: FIBA
Rules for classification: 1) Points; 2) Head-to-head results; 3) Points difference; 4) Points scored.
Notes:

23 February 2018	Senegal	70–65	Central African Republic	Maputo
16:30	Scoring by quarter: 17–19, 18–18, 19–18, 16–10
	Pts: Sambe 16; Rebs: Thomas 9 Asts: Thiam 3	Boxscore	Pts: Damachoua 20; Rebs: Grebongo 8 Asts: Damachoua, Grebongo 2	Arena: Pavilhão do Maxaquene; Attendance: 400; Referees: Amr Aboollo (EGY), Kingsley Ojeaburu (NGR), Antonio Bernardo (ANG)

23 February 2018	Mozambique	66–53	Ivory Coast	Maputo
19:00	Scoring by quarter: 18–17, 12–16, 20–4, 16–16
	Pts: Matos 15; Rebs: Muchate 7 Asts: three players 4	Boxscore	Pts: Abouo 19; Rebs: Diabate 8 Asts: Abouo, Diabate 2	Arena: Pavilhão do Maxaquene; Referees: Didier Shema-Maboko (RWA), Wael Mostafa (EGY), Cherubin Leslie (MRI)

24 February 2018	Ivory Coast	67–60	Senegal	Maputo
15:00	Scoring by quarter: 13–16, 17–12, 17–9, 20–23
	Pts: Abouo 17; Rebs: Abouo 8 Asts: Diabate 4	Boxscore	Pts: Sambe 12; Rebs: Badji, Diame 6 Asts: Thomas 2	Arena: Pavilhão do Maxaquene; Referees: Didier Shema-Maboko (RWA), Wael Mostafa (EGY), Tonton Banza (COD)

24 February 2018	Central African Republic	52–59	Mozambique	Maputo
17:30	Scoring by quarter: 11–11, 14–13, 14–14, 13–21
	Pts: Damachoua 15; Rebs: Zachée 8 Asts: Kossangue-Toro 3	Boxscore	Pts: Ubisse 16; Rebs: Muchate 10; Asts: Matos 3	Arena: Pavilhão do Maxaquene; Referees: Amr Aboollo (EGY), Cherubin Leslie (MRI), Kingsley Ojeaburu (NGR)

25 February 2018	Ivory Coast	62–63(OT)	Central African Republic	Maputo
15:00	Scoring by quarter: 11–17, 13–14, 10–8, 21–16, Overtime: 7–8
	Pts: Diabate 13; Rebs: Kouassi 12; Asts: Diabate 4	Boxscore	Pts: Damachoua 17; Rebs: Grebongo 18; Asts: Kossangue-Toro, Zachée 2	Arena: Pavilhão do Maxaquene; Attendance: 300; Referees: Amr Aboollo (EGY), Didier Shema-Maboko (RWA), Tonton Banza (COD)

25 February 2018	Senegal	60–52	Mozambique	Maputo
17:30	Scoring by quarter: 5–18, 19–14, 15–9, 21–11
	Pts: Badji 15; Rebs: Badji 13; Asts: Sambe 4	Boxscore	Pts: Ubisse 18; Rebs: Ubisse 7 Asts: Matos 3	Arena: Pavilhão do Maxaquene; Referees: Wael Mostafa (EGY), Antonio Bernardo (ANG), Cherubin Leslie (MRI)

29 June 2018	Ivory Coast	62–45	Mozambique	Dakar
16:30	Scoring by quarter: 11–11, 10–10, 22–7, 19–17
	Pts: Abouo 16; Rebs: Fofana 6 Asts: Diabate 4	Boxscore	Pts: Manuel 14; Rebs: Muchate 11; Asts: three players 2	Arena: Marius Ndiaye Stadium; Referees: Samir Abaakil (MAR), Saber Rezgui (TUN), Gonzalo Salgueiro (URU)

29 June 2018	Central African Republic	82–91	Senegal	Dakar
19:00	Scoring by quarter: 19–18, 22–26, 24–24, 17–23
	Pts: Kouguere 17; Rebs: Jefferson, Kouguere 5 Asts: Kouguere 4	Boxscore	Pts: Dieng 23; Rebs: Dieng 8 Asts: Xane D'Almeida 9	Arena: Marius Ndiaye Stadium; Referees: Arnaud Kom Njilo (CMR), Kingsley Ojeaburu (NGR), Peter Kirabo (UGA)

30 June 2018	Mozambique	63–72	Central African Republic	Dakar
16:30	Scoring by quarter: 18–16, 5–11, 16–21, 24–24
	Pts: Manuel 19; Rebs: Ubisse 11; Asts: Nurmamade 3	Boxscore	Pts: Ganapamo 14; Rebs: Jefferson 11; Asts: Grebongo 5	Arena: Marius Ndiaye Stadium; Attendance: 500; Referees: Arnaud Kom Njilo (CMR), Peter Kirabo (UGA), Saber Rezgui (TUN)

30 June 2018	Senegal	66–61	Ivory Coast	Dakar
19:00	Scoring by quarter: 18–8, 12–12, 24–17, 12–24
	Pts: Dieng 14; Rebs: Dieng 15; Asts: D'Almeida, Sambe 4	Boxscore	Pts: Diabate 12; Rebs: Adjehi 9 Asts: Adjehi 3	Arena: Marius Ndiaye Stadium; Attendance: 2,500; Referees: Samir Abaakil (MAR), Gonzalo Salgueiro (URU), Sameh Estafanous (EGY)

1 July 2018	Central African Republic	69–60	Ivory Coast	Dakar
16:30	Scoring by quarter: 11–2, 20–26, 20–10, 18–22
	Pts: Damachoua 18; Rebs: Jefferson 13; Asts: Damachoua 6	Boxscore	Pts: Edi 16; Rebs: Edi 11; Asts: Diabate 9	Arena: Marius Ndiaye Stadium; Attendance: 300; Referees: Samir Abaakil (MAR), Gonzalo Salgueiro (URU), Kingsley Ojeaburu (NGR)

1 July 2018	Mozambique	63–78	Senegal	Dakar
19:00	Scoring by quarter: 16–21, 10–16, 24–16, 13–25
	Pts: Manuel 32; Rebs: Manuel 7 Asts: Houana, Muchate 3	Boxscore	Pts: Sambe 18; Rebs: Ndoye 8 Asts: D'Almeida 11	Arena: Marius Ndiaye Stadium; Attendance: 300; Referees: Arnaud Kom Njilo (CMR), Sameh Estafanous (EGY), Saber Resgui (TUN)

== Second round ==
In the second round, the top three teams from each group were placed in a group with three other top teams. All results from the first round, were carried over to the second round. Games were played in September 2018, November 2018 and February 2019. The top two teams in each group along with the best-placed third team qualified for the FIBA Basketball World Cup proper.

=== Group E ===
Pos	Team	Pld	W	L	PF	PA	PD	Pts	Qualification
1	Tunisia	12	10	2	933	669	+264	22	2019 FIBA Basketball World Cup
2	Angola	12	9	3	829	748	+81	21	2019 FIBA Basketball World Cup
3	Cameroon	12	7	5	872	794	+78	19 (Note: Cameroon 1–1, +16 PD; Egypt 1–1, –16 PD)	
4	Egypt	12	7	5	802	799	+3	19	
5	Morocco	12	4	8	739	789	−50	16	
6	Chad	12	3	9	721	898	−177	15	

Source: FIBA
Rules for classification: 1) Points; 2) Head-to-head results; 3) Points difference; 4) Points scored.
Notes:

14 September 2018	Angola	83–76	Cameroon	Radès
15:30	Scoring by quarter: 22–14, 23–20, 25–29, 13–13
	Pts: Moreira 20; Rebs: Moreira 9 Asts: Morais 6	Boxscore	Pts: Mbala 20; Rebs: Nnoko 6 Asts: Nzeulie, Pitard 4	Arena: Salle Omnisport de Radès; Referees: Felipe Valenzuela (CHI), Youssouf Maiga (MLI), Kingsley Ojeaburu (NGA)

14 September 2018	Morocco	50–65	Tunisia	Radès
18:00	Scoring by quarter: 13–12, 10–21, 13–26, 14–6
	Pts: Lahrichi 11; Rebs: Lahrichi 7 Asts: three players 3	Boxscore	Pts: three players 13; Rebs: Mejri 9 Asts: Roll 4	Arena: Salle Omnisport de Radès; Referees: Cherubin Leslie (MRI), Ilias Kounellis (CYP), Mbaye Seye (SEN)

14 September 2018	Egypt	99–83	Chad	Radès
20:30	Scoring by quarter: 21–23, 22–26, 30–14, 26–20
	Pts: Oraby 18; Rebs: Oraby 10; Asts: Abdalla 5	Boxscore	Pts: Nato Kolmia 18; Rebs: Nakidjim 8 Asts: Ndilngar 4	Arena: Salle Omnisport de Radès; Referees: Babacar Gueye (SEN), Hassane Kamate (CIV), Opeyemi Ogunleye (NGR)

15 September 2018	Cameroon	84–74	Morocco	Radès
15:30	Scoring by quarter: 22–20, 20–19, 12–24, 30–11
	Pts: Adala, Nzeulie 18; Rebs: Sama 7 Asts: Nzeulie 4	Boxscore	Pts: Kourdou 14; Rebs: Gourari 8 Asts: Gourari, Lahrichi 3	Arena: Salle Omnisport de Radès; Referees: Felipe Valenzuela (CHI), Babacar Gueye (SEN), Mathurin N'Guessan (CIV)

15 September 2018	Tunisia	69–47	Egypt	Radès
18:00	Scoring by quarter: 24–12, 13–12, 19–15, 13–8
	Pts: Abada, Lahiani 15; Rebs: Mejri 9 Asts: Roll 7	Boxscore	Pts: Marei 14; Rebs: Marei 5 Asts: El-Maraghy 5	Arena: Salle Omnisport de Radès; Referees: Youssouf Maiga (MLI), Kingsley Ojeaburu (NGR), Mbaye Seye (SEN)

15 September 2018	Chad	33–75	Angola	Radès
20:30	Scoring by quarter: 13–16, 4–19, 9–23, 7–17
	Pts: Koibe 12; Rebs: Djimassal 16; Asts: Alain 3	Boxscore	Pts: Morais 23; Rebs: Moore 8 Asts: Moore 4	Arena: Salle Omnisport de Radès; Referees: Ilias Kounellis (CYP), Cherubin Leslie (MRI), Peter Kirabo (UGA)

16 September 2018	Chad	69–63	Morocco	Radès
15:30	Scoring by quarter: 18–15, 19–13, 22–16, 10–19
	Pts: Moguena 16; Rebs: Nakidjim 14; Asts: Alain 6	Boxscore	Pts: Lahrichi 19; Rebs: Lahrichi 9 Asts: Hachad 5	Arena: Salle Omnisport de Radès; Referees: Mathurin N'Guessan (CIV), Hassane Kamate (CIV), Opeyemi Ogunleye (NGR)

16 September 2018	Tunisia	84–64	Angola	Radès
18:00	Scoring by quarter: 17–15, 22–21, 23–13, 22–15
	Pts: Ben Romdhane 25; Rebs: Mejri 12; Asts: Roll 5	Boxscore	Pts: Moore 18; Rebs: Morais 8 Asts: Paulo 3	Arena: Salle Omnisport de Radès; Referees: Felipe Valenzuela (CHI), Cherubin Leslie (MRI), Kingsley Ojeaburu (NGR)

16 September 2018	Cameroon	58–62	Egypt	Radès
20:30	Scoring by quarter: 10–10, 17–17, 13–19, 18–16
	Pts: Mbala 19; Rebs: Nnoko 6 Asts: Adala 3	Boxscore	Pts: Ibrahim, Oraby 10; Rebs: Gunady 7 Asts: three players 2	Arena: Salle Omnisport de Radès; Referees: Youssouf Maiga (MLI), Ilias Kounellis (CYP), Mbaye Seye (SEN)

30 November 2018	Tunisia	89–51	Morocco	Luanda
15:00	Scoring by quarter: 34–12, 16–12, 18–8, 21–19
	Pts: Abada, El Mabrouk 13; Rebs: Ghyaza 6 Asts: Abada 7	Boxscore	Pts: Benchlikha 13; Rebs: El Ghazi, El Hanini 5 Asts: three players 2	Arena: Pavilhão Multiusos do Kilamba; Attendance: 567; Referees: Babacar Gueye (SEN), Aboulaye Kamagate (CIV), Juan Fernández (ARG)

30 November 2018	Chad	58–85	Egypt	Luanda
17:30	Scoring by quarter: 10–20, 14–26, 17–17, 17–22
	Pts: Nakidjim, Nato Kolmia 12; Rebs: Nakidjim 16; Asts: Ndilngar 3	Boxscore	Pts: El-Gammal 13; Rebs: Kamal 8 Asts: Farag 5	Arena: Pavilhão Multiusos do Kilamba; Attendance: 102; Referees: Cherubin Leslie (MRI), Tonton Banza (COD), Peter Kirabo (UGA)

30 November 2018	Cameroon	73–77	Angola	Luanda
20:00	Scoring by quarter: 24–17, 15–19, 15–14, 19–27
	Pts: Mbala 17; Rebs: three players 7 Asts: Nzeulie, Yangue 2	Boxscore	Pts: Morais 22; Rebs: Moreira 9 Asts: six players 2	Arena: Pavilhão Multiusos do Kilamba; Attendance: 746; Referees: Ognjen Jokić (MNE), Kingsley Ojeaburu (NGR), Mbaye Seye (SEN)

1 December 2018	Egypt	73–64(OT)	Tunisia	Luanda
15:00	Scoring by quarter: 22–23, 15–14, 9–10, 12–11, Overtime: 15–6
	Pts: Oraby 16; Rebs: Oraby 13; Asts: El-Gammal 7	Boxscore	Pts: El Mabrouk 14; Rebs: three players 6 Asts: Ben Romdhane, El Mabrouk 3	Arena: Pavilhão Multiusos do Kilamba; Attendance: 90; Referees: Ognjen Jokić (MNE), Youssouf Maiga (MLI), Mbaye Seye (SEN)

1 December 2018	Morocco	57–63	Cameroon	Luanda
17:30	Scoring by quarter: 16–13, 10–18, 13–14, 18–18
	Pts: Choua 14; Rebs: Choua 12; Asts: Lahrichi 3	Boxscore	Pts: Adala 20; Rebs: Kadji 10; Asts: Adala, Nzeulie 3	Arena: Pavilhão Multiusos do Kilamba; Attendance: 678; Referees: Juan Fernández (ARG), Cherubin Leslie (MRI), Babacar Gueye (SEN)

1 December 2018	Angola	90–50	Chad	Luanda
20:00	Scoring by quarter: 24–16, 20–7, 27–16, 19–11
	Pts: Morais 14; Rebs: Moreira 10; Asts: Moreira 10	Boxscore	Pts: Moguena 14; Rebs: Nakidjim 11; Asts: Allah-Asra, Ndoumangar 2	Arena: Pavilhão Multiusos do Kilamba; Attendance: 133; Referees: Kingsley Ojeaburu (NGR), Mathurin N'Guessan (CIV), Peter Kirabo (UGA)

2 December 2018	Egypt	60–80	Cameroon	Luanda
15:00	Scoring by quarter: 25–22, 14–23, 12–21, 9–14
	Pts: El-Gammal 16; Rebs: Mahmoud 8 Asts: El-Gammal 3	Boxscore	Pts: Nzeulie 30; Rebs: Adala, Frank 8 Asts: Nzeulie 5	Arena: Pavilhão Multiusos do Kilamba; Attendance: 40; Referees: Ognjen Jokić (MNE), Kingsley Ojeaburu (NGR), Mathurin N'Guessan (CIV)

2 December 2018	Morocco	62–45	Chad	Luanda
17:30	Scoring by quarter: 16–3, 15–10, 18–14, 13–18
	Pts: Benhmine 16; Rebs: El Ghazi 9 Asts: Lahrichi 5	Boxscore	Pts: Nato Kolmia 16; Rebs: Koibe 9 Asts: Ndilngar 4	Arena: Pavilhão Multiusos do Kilamba; Attendance: 465; Referees: Cherubin Leslie (MRI), Aboulaye Kamagate (CIV), Youssouf Maiga (MLI)

2 December 2018	Angola	69–63	Tunisia	Luanda
20:00	Scoring by quarter: 14–12, 24–17, 19–21, 12–13
	Pts: Morais 17; Rebs: Moreira 6 Asts: Domingos 4	Boxscore	Pts: Ben Romdhane 16; Rebs: Ben Romdhane 11; Asts: Abada, El Mabrouk 4	Arena: Pavilhão Multiusos do Kilamba; Attendance: 15,000; Referees: Juan Fernández (ARG), Mbaye Seye (SEN), Tonton Banza (COD)

=== Group F ===
Pos	Team	Pld	W	L	PF	PA	PD	Pts	Qualification
1	Nigeria	12	10	2	1073	805	+268	22 (Note: Nigeria 1–1, +7 PD; Senegal 1–1, –7 PD)	2019 FIBA Basketball World Cup
2	Senegal	12	10	2	889	781	+108	22	2019 FIBA Basketball World Cup
3	Ivory Coast	12	7	5	806	720	+86	19	2019 FIBA Basketball World Cup
4	Central African Republic	12	6	6	816	844	−28	18	
5	Rwanda	12	3	9	807	997	−190	15 (Note: Rwanda 2–0; Mali 0–2)	
6	Mali	12	3	9	768	909	−141	15	

Source: FIBA
Rules for classification: 1) Points; 2) Head-to-head results; 3) Points difference; 4) Points scored.
Notes:

14 September 2018	Central African Republic	65–66	Mali	Lagos
15:00	Scoring by quarter: 15–15, 22–10, 13–18, 15–23
	Pts: Kouguere 19; Rebs: Djimrabaye 7 Asts: three players 5	Boxscore	Pts: Djambo 16; Rebs: three players 6 Asts: Kanté 6	Arena: National Stadium; Referees: Ognjen Jokić (MNE), Amr Aboollo (EGY), Saber Rezgui (TUN)

14 September 2018	Senegal	94–89	Rwanda	Lagos
17:30	Scoring by quarter: 24–24, 24–12, 23–24, 23–29
	Pts: Dieng 28; Rebs: Dieng, Y. Ndoye 7 Asts: D'Almeida 9	Boxscore	Pts: Gasana 19; Rebs: Kabangu 8 Asts: Gasana 4	Arena: National Stadium; Referees: Samir Abaakil (MAR), Andrés Bartel (URU), Wael Mostafa (EGY)

14 September 2018	Ivory Coast	73–84	Nigeria	Lagos
20:00	Scoring by quarter: 19–21, 13–20, 16–23, 25–20
	Pts: Fofana 15; Rebs: Abouo 6 Asts: Diabate 6	Boxscore	Pts: Emegano 15; Rebs: Diogu 6 Asts: Al-F. Aminu 4	Arena: National Stadium; Referees: Arnaud Kom Njilo (CMR), Tarek Ben Ltaifa (TUN), Tonton Banza (COD)

15 September 2018	Mali	71–82	Senegal	Lagos
15:00	Scoring by quarter: 20–20, 17–17, 12–26, 22–19
	Pts: Cissé 17; Rebs: three players 8 Asts: Kanté 6	Boxscore	Pts: Y. Ndoye 23; Rebs: Y. Ndoye 9 Asts: D'Almeida 9	Arena: National Stadium; Referees: Samir Abaakil (MAR), Arnaud Kom Njilo (CMR), Artur De Castro (MOZ)

15 September 2018	Rwanda	53–71	Ivory Coast	Lagos
17:30	Scoring by quarter: 19–21, 14–19, 4–16, 16–15
	Pts: Ndayisaba 13; Rebs: Rwabigwi 6 Asts: Gasana 4	Boxscore	Pts: Fofana 16; Rebs: Adjehi, Fofana 7 Asts: Diabate 5	Arena: National Stadium; Referees: Andrés Bartel (URU), Amr Aboollo (EGY), Tarek Ben Ltaifa (TUN)

15 September 2018	Nigeria	114–69	Central African Republic	Lagos
20:00	Scoring by quarter: 25–20, 26–19, 37–21, 26–9
	Pts: Iroegbu 18; Rebs: Al-F. Aminu 8 Asts: Al-F. Aminu 5	Boxscore	Pts: Grebongo 17; Rebs: Djimrabaye 6 Asts: Damachoua 3	Arena: National Stadium; Referees: Ognjen Jokić (MNE), Wael Mostafa (EGY), Saber Rezgui (TUN)

16 September 2018	Mali	59–69	Ivory Coast	Lagos
15:00	Scoring by quarter: 18–19, 7–16, 18–15, 16–19
	Pts: Cissé, Djambo 13; Rebs: Djambo 10; Asts: Kanté 8	Boxscore	Pts: Fofana 15; Rebs: Abouo 7 Asts: Diabate, Fofana 3	Arena: National Stadium; Referees: Ognjen Jokić (MNE), Tarek Ben Ltaifa (TUN), Tonton Banza (COD)

16 September 2018	Rwanda	61–68	Central African Republic	Lagos
17:30	Scoring by quarter: 13–16, 14–11, 17–14, 17–27
	Pts: Rwabigwi 16; Rebs: Kaje 9 Asts: Gasana 6	Boxscore	Pts: Damachoua 18; Rebs: Jefferson 10; Asts: four players 2	Arena: National Stadium; Referees: Arnaud Kom Njilo (CMR), Wael Mostafa (EGY), Artur De Castro (MOZ)

16 September 2018	Nigeria	89–61	Senegal	Lagos
20:00	Scoring by quarter: 27–14, 22–17, 17–18, 23–12
	Pts: Diogu 17; Rebs: Diogu 9 Asts: Iroegbu 5	Boxscore	Pts: Dieng 17; Rebs: Y. Ndoye 10; Asts: three players 3	Arena: National Stadium; Referees: Samir Abaakil (MAR), Andrés Bartel (URU), Amr Aboollo (EGY)

22 February 2019	Mali	57–75	Central African Republic	Abidjan
15:00	Scoring by quarter: 12–17, 11–18, 15–19, 19–21
	Pts: Cissé 17; Rebs: Djambo 7 Asts: Dramé 4	Boxscore	Pts: Damachoua 18; Rebs: Jefferson 10; Asts: Damachoua, Zachée 4	Arena: Palais des Sports de Treichville; Referees: Samir Abaakil (MAR), Tarek Ben Ltaifa (TUN), Amr Aboollo (EGY)

22 February 2019	Rwanda	41–81	Senegal	Abidjan
17:30	Scoring by quarter: 14–26, 8–17, 9–23, 10–15
	Pts: Ndayisaba 7 Rebs: Shyaka 6 Asts: Garrett 3	Boxscore	Pts: Ndoye 18; Rebs: Ndoye 9 Asts: four players 3	Arena: Palais des Sports de Treichville; Attendance: 480; Referees: Martin Horozov (BUL), Saber Rezgui (TUN), Tonton Kaluma (COD)

22 February 2019	Nigeria	46–72	Ivory Coast	Abidjan
20:00	Scoring by quarter: 10–14, 9–14, 12–27, 15–17
	Pts: Diogu 10; Rebs: Ibekwe 10; Asts: Akindele, Diogu 2	Boxscore	Pts: Edi 15; Rebs: Koné 10; Asts: Edi 5	Arena: Palais des Sports de Treichville; Attendance: 2,000; Referees: Daniel García (VEN), Wael Mostafa (EGY), Cherubin Leslie (MRI)

23 February 2019	Senegal	62–38	Mali	Abidjan
15:00	Scoring by quarter: 17–12, 22–10, 16–13, 7–3
	Pts: Touré 14; Rebs: Touré 11; Asts: three players 3	Boxscore	Pts: N. Diarra 10; Rebs: Sidibe 7 Asts: Cissé 3	Arena: Palais des Sports de Treichville; Attendance: 850; Referees: Arnaud Kom Njilo (CMR), Wael Mostafa (EGY), Amr Aboollo (EGY)

23 February 2019	Central African Republic	59–72	Nigeria	Abidjan
17:30	Scoring by quarter: 14–14, 11–18, 15–21, 19–19
	Pts: Jefferson 16; Rebs: Sato, Zianveni 5 Asts: Kossangue, Zachée 4	Boxscore	Pts: Diogu 22; Rebs: Iroegbu 10; Asts: Umeh 5	Arena: Palais des Sports de Treichville; Referees: Daniel García (VEN), Antonio Ferraz (ANG), Tarek Ben Ltaifa (TUN)

23 February 2019	Ivory Coast	87–60	Rwanda	Abidjan
20:00	Scoring by quarter: 18–15, 29–14, 19–15, 21–16
	Pts: Fofana 21; Rebs: Koné 10; Asts: Pamba 7	Boxscore	Pts: Kabangu 16; Rebs: Kabangu, Rwabigwi 6 Asts: Gasana 5	Arena: Palais des Sports de Treichville; Referees: Samir Abaakil (MAR), Martin Horozov (BUL), Cherubin Leslie (MRI)

24 February 2019	Senegal	84–63	Nigeria	Abidjan
15:00	Scoring by quarter: 27–19, 13–15, 23–19, 21–10
	Pts: Touré 20; Rebs: Touré 10; Asts: D'Almeida 7	Boxscore	Pts: Iroegbu 28; Rebs: Diogu 7 Asts: Iroegbu 6	Arena: Palais des Sports de Treichville; Attendance: 500; Referees: Martin Horozov (BUL), Antonio Ferraz (ANG), Saber Rezgui (TUN)

24 February 2019	Central African Republic	77–69	Rwanda	Abidjan
17:30	Scoring by quarter: 20–12, 14–26, 18–19, 25–12
	Pts: Damachoua 18; Rebs: Djimrabaye 9 Asts: Sato 8	Boxscore	Pts: Gasana 33; Rebs: Gasana 7 Asts: Nshobozwabyosenumukiza 5	Arena: Palais des Sports de Treichville; Referees: Arnaud Kom Njilo (CMR), Tarek Ben Ltaifa (TUN), Tonton Banza (COD)

24 February 2019	Ivory Coast	69–49	Mali	Abidjan
20:00	Scoring by quarter: 26–15, 18–11, 13–10, 12–13
	Pts: Diabate 16; Rebs: Koné 6 Asts: Koné 3	Boxscore	Pts: Dramé 9 Rebs: Sidibe 8 Asts: Sidibé 2	Arena: Palais des Sports de Treichville; Attendance: 2,000; Referees: Daniel García (VEN), Samir Abaakil (MAR), Wael Mostafa (EGY)

=== Best third placed team ===
Pos	Grp	Team	Pld	W	L	PF	PA	PD	Pts	Qualification
1	F	Ivory Coast	12	7	5	806	720	+86	19	2019 FIBA Basketball World Cup
2	E	Cameroon	12	7	5	872	794	+78	19	

Source: FIBA

== Statistical leaders ==
As of 24 February 2019

=== Player averages ===
Category	Player	Team	Average
Points	Robinson Opong	Uganda	18.3
Rebounds	Placide Nakidjim	Chad	10.3
Assists	Xane D'Almeida	Senegal	5.6
Steals	Solo Diabate	Ivory Coast	2.3
Blocks	Mohamed Choua	Morocco	1.5
Minutes	Adil El Makssoud	Morocco	33.0
Efficiency	Robinson Opong	Uganda	16.0

=== Team averages ===
Category	Team	Average
Points	Nigeria	89.5
Rebounds	DR Congo	45.3
Assists	Nigeria	19.5
Steals	Tunisia	10.6
Blocks	DR Congo	4.5
Efficiency	Nigeria	105.8
