= 2019 FIBA Basketball World Cup qualification =

2019 FIBA Basketball World Cup
Qualification

Tournament details
- Dates: 2 August 2017 – 25 February 2019
- Teams: 213 max. (from 213 federations)

Official website
- FIBA.basketball

The 2019 FIBA Basketball World Cup qualification was the first World Cup for which teams had to qualify for under the new qualification system. The process determined 31 out of the 32 teams that participated at the 2019 FIBA Basketball World Cup.

== Qualified teams ==
Team	Qualification		Appearance			Best performance	FIBA World Ranking
Team	As	Date	Last	Total	Streak	Best performance	FIBA World Ranking
China	Host nation	7 August 2015	2010	9	1	8th place (1994)	30
Tunisia	African Second Round Group E Top 2	15 September 2018	2010	2	1	24th place (2010)	51
Nigeria	African Second Round Group F Top 2	15 September 2018	2006	4	1	13th place (1998)	33
Greece	European Second Round Group L Top 3	16 September 2018	2014	8	4	Runners-up (2006)	8
Germany	European Second Round Group L Top 3	16 September 2018	2010	6	1	3rd place (2002)	22
Czech Republic	European Second Round Group K Top 3	16 September 2018	N/A	1	1	Debut	24
Lithuania	European Second Round Group J Top 3	17 September 2018	2014	5	4	3rd place (2010)	6
Australia	Asian Second Round Group F Top 3	30 November 2018	2014	12	4	5th place (1982, 1994)	11
France	European Second Round Group K Top 3	30 November 2018	2014	8	4	3rd place (2014)	3
Angola	African Second Round Group F Top 2	1 December 2018	2014	8	5	9th place (2006)	39
New Zealand	Asian Second Round Group E Top 3	1 December 2018	2014	6	5	4th place (2002)	38
South Korea	Asian Second Round Group E Top 3	2 December 2018	2014	8	2	11th place (1970)	32
Spain	European Second Round Group I Top 3	2 December 2018	2014	12	10	Champions (2006)	2
Turkey	European Second Round Group I Top 3	2 December 2018	2014	5	5	Runners-up (2010)	17
United States	Americas Second Round Group E Top 3	2 December 2018	2014	18	18	Champions (1954, 1986, 1994, 2010, 2014)	1
Venezuela	Americas Second Round Group F Top 3	2 December 2018	2006	4	1	11th place (1990)	20
Argentina	Americas Second Round Group E Top 3	2 December 2018	2014	14	9	Champions (1950)	5
Canada	Americas Second Round Group F Top 3	3 December 2018	2010	14	1	6th place (1978, 1982)	23
Brazil	Americas Second Round Group F Top 3	21 February 2019	2014	18	18	Champions (1959, 1963)	12
Senegal	African Second Round Group F Top 2	22 February 2019	2014	5	2	14th place (1978)	37
Italy	European Second Round Group J Top 3	22 February 2019	2006	9	1	4th place (1970, 1978)	13
Poland	European Second Round Group J Top 3	22 February 2019	1967	2	1	5th place (1967)	25
Russia	European Second Round Group K Top 3	24 February 2019	2010	5	1	Runners-up (1994, 1998)	10
Japan	Asian Second Round Group F Top 3	24 February 2019	2006	5	1	11th place (1967)	48
Jordan	Asian Second Round Group E Top 3	24 February 2019	2010	2	1	23rd place (2010)	49
Iran	Asian Second Round Group F Top 3	24 February 2019	2014	3	3	19th place (2010)	27
Philippines	Asian best fourth placed team	24 February 2019	2014	6	2	3rd place (1954)	31
Serbia	European Second Round Group L Top 3	24 February 2019	2014	3	3	2nd (2014)	4
Ivory Coast	African Best third placed team	24 February 2019	2010	4	1	13th place (1982, 1986)	64
Montenegro	European Second Round Group I Top 3	25 February 2019	N/A	1	1	Debut	28
Puerto Rico	Americas Second Round Group E Top 3	25 February 2019	2014	14	9	4th place (1990)	16
Dominican Republic	Americas best fourth placed team	25 February 2019	2014	3	2	12th place (1978)	18

== Format ==
The continental championships no longer belong to the qualification system for the World Cup. Instead, two rounds of continental qualifying tournaments were held over two years in a home-and-away format.

The first round of the qualifiers were held in late 2017 and early 2018. The Americas, Asia / Oceania and Africa qualifiers featured 16 teams each, whereas Europe had 32 teams. Division A teams was split in groups of four, to be held in a home-and-away round-robin. The top three teams in each groups advanced to round two, and last placed teams played the best Division B teams to qualify for the next season's Division A.

Round two of the World Cup qualifiers were held in late 2018 and early 2019. Teams were split in groups of six, totaling four groups in Europe and two in the other qualifiers. Teams carried over the points from round one, and face another three teams again in a home-and-away round-robin. The best teams in each group qualified for the World Cup.

Starting in 2019, no wild card qualification were held, and the Olympic champions no longer directly qualified to the World Cup.

The draw for the qualifiers was held on 7 May 2017 in Guangzhou, China.

FIBA zone	Qualifying tournaments		World Cup berths		
FIBA zone	Division A top ranked teams	Division B maximum possible entrants	Allocated berths	Berth as the host nation	Total berths
FIBA Africa	16	2	5	0	5
FIBA Americas	16	2	7	0	7
FIBA Asia; FIBA Oceania	16	17	7	1	8
FIBA Europe	32	13	12	0	12
Total	80	114	31	1	32

== Confederation qualifications ==
=== FIBA Africa ===
==== First round ====
===== Group A =====
Pos	Team	Pld	W	L	PF	PA	PD	Pts	Qualification	Tunisia	Cameroon	Chad	Guinea
1	Tunisia	6	6	0	499	315	+184	12	Second round	—	56–53	101–40	94–54
2	Cameroon	6	4	2	438	381	+57	10	Second round	66–67	—	73–72	116–78
3	Chad	6	2	4	383	424	−41	8	Second round	46–85	60–65	—	80–49
4	Guinea	6	0	6	336	536	−200	6		56–96	48–65	51–85	—

Source: FIBA
Rules for classification: 1) Points; 2) Head-to-head results; 3) Points difference; 4) Points scored.

===== Group B =====
Pos	Team	Pld	W	L	PF	PA	PD	Pts	Qualification	Nigeria	Rwanda	Mali	Uganda
1	Nigeria	6	6	0	605	387	+218	12	Second round	—	108–53	93–53	109–66
2	Rwanda	6	3	3	434	519	−85	9	Second round	70–111	—	74–70	92–79
3	Mali	6	2	4	428	487	−59	8	Second round	59–82	72–82	—	79–76
4	Uganda	6	1	5	466	540	−74	7		86–102	79–63	80–95	—

Source: FIBA
Rules for classification: 1) Points; 2) Head-to-head results; 3) Points difference; 4) Points scored.

===== Group C =====
Pos	Team	Pld	W	L	PF	PA	PD	Pts	Qualification	Angola	Egypt	Morocco	Democratic Republic of the Congo
1	Angola	6	4	2	371	369	+2	10	Second round	—	65–58	62–56	56–66
2	Egypt	6	3	3	376	387	−11	9 (Note: Egypt 2–0; Morocco 0–2)	Second round	64–68	—	59–53	63–77
3	Morocco	6	3	3	382	374	+8	9	Second round	61–47	63–67	—	88–81
4	DR Congo	6	2	4	407	406	+1	8		64–73	61–65	58–61	—

Source: FIBA
Rules for classification: 1) Points; 2) Head-to-head results; 3) Points difference; 4) Points scored.

===== Group D =====
Pos	Team	Pld	W	L	PF	PA	PD	Pts	Qualification	Senegal	Central African Republic	Côte d'Ivoire	Mozambique
1	Senegal	6	5	1	425	390	+35	11	Second round	—	70–65	66–61	60–52
2	Central African Republic	6	3	3	403	405	−2	9	Second round	82–91	—	69–60	52–59
3	Ivory Coast	6	2	4	365	369	−4	8 (Note: Ivory Coast 1–1, +4 PD; Mozambique 1–1, –4 PD)	Second round	67–60	62–63	—	62–45
4	Mozambique	6	2	4	348	377	−29	8		63–78	63–72	66–53	—

Source: FIBA
Rules for classification: 1) Points; 2) Head-to-head results; 3) Points difference; 4) Points scored.

==== Second round ====
===== Group E =====
Pos	Team	Pld	W	L	PF	PA	PD	Pts	Qualification	Tunisia	Angola	Cameroon	Egypt	Morocco	Chad
1	Tunisia	12	10	2	933	669	+264	22	2019 FIBA Basketball World Cup	—	84–64	56–53	69–47	89–51	101–40
2	Angola	12	9	3	829	748	+81	21	2019 FIBA Basketball World Cup	69–63	—	83–76	65–58	62–56	90–50
3	Cameroon	12	7	5	872	794	+78	19 (Note: Cameroon 1–1, +16 PD; Egypt 1–1, –16 PD)		66–67	73–77	—	58–62	84–74	73–72
4	Egypt	12	7	5	802	799	+3	19		73–64 (OT)	64–68	60–80	—	59–53	99–83
5	Morocco	12	4	8	739	789	−50	16		50–65	61–47	57–63	63–67	—	62–45
6	Chad	12	3	9	721	898	−177	15		46–85	33–75	60–65	58–85	69–63	—

Source: FIBA
Rules for classification: 1) Points; 2) Head-to-head results; 3) Points difference; 4) Points scored.

===== Group F =====
Pos	Team	Pld	W	L	PF	PA	PD	Pts	Qualification	Nigeria	Senegal	Côte d'Ivoire	Central African Republic	Rwanda	Mali
1	Nigeria	12	10	2	1073	805	+268	22 (Note: Nigeria 1–1, +7 PD; Senegal 1–1, –7 PD)	2019 FIBA Basketball World Cup	—	89–61	46–72	114–69	108–53	93–53
2	Senegal	12	10	2	889	781	+108	22	2019 FIBA Basketball World Cup	84–63	—	66–61	70–65	94–89	62–38
3	Ivory Coast	12	7	5	806	720	+86	19	2019 FIBA Basketball World Cup	73–84	67–60	—	62–63	87–60	69–49
4	Central African Republic	12	6	6	816	844	−28	18		59–72	82–91	69–60	—	77–69	65–66
5	Rwanda	12	3	9	807	997	−190	15 (Note: Rwanda 2–0; Mali 0–2)		70–111	41–81	53–71	61–68	—	74–70
6	Mali	12	3	9	768	909	−141	15		59–82	71–82	59–69	57–75	72–82	—

Source: FIBA
Rules for classification: 1) Points; 2) Head-to-head results; 3) Points difference; 4) Points scored.

===== Best third placed team =====
Pos	Grp	Team	Pld	W	L	PF	PA	PD	Pts	Qualification
1	F	Ivory Coast	12	7	5	806	720	+86	19	2019 FIBA Basketball World Cup
2	E	Cameroon	12	7	5	872	794	+78	19	

Source: FIBA

=== FIBA Americas ===
==== First round ====
===== Group A =====
Pos	Team	Pld	W	L	PF	PA	PD	Pts	Qualification	Argentina	Uruguay	Panama	Paraguay
1	Argentina	6	5	1	519	391	+128	11	Second round	—	83–88	87–62	96–63
2	Uruguay	6	4	2	432	442	−10	10	Second round	58–102	—	86–73	67–49
3	Panama	6	3	3	436	445	−9	9	Second round	59–68	86–75	—	82–62
4	Paraguay	6	0	6	351	460	−109	6		61–83	49–58	67–74	—

Source: FIBA
Rules for classification: 1) Points; 2) Head-to-head results; 3) Points difference; 4) Points scored.

===== Group B =====
Pos	Team	Pld	W	L	PF	PA	PD	Pts	Qualification	Venezuela	Brazil	Chile	Colombia
1	Venezuela	6	5	1	437	368	+69	11 (Note: Venezuela 1–1, +4 PD; Brazil 1–1, –4 PD)	Second round	—	72–56	77–56	85–71
2	Brazil	6	5	1	479	383	+96	11	Second round	72–60	—	83–58	84–49
3	Chile	6	1	5	379	456	−77	7 (Note: Chile 1–1, +1 PD; Colombia 1–1, –1 PD)	Second round	51–70	73–86	—	67–71
4	Colombia	6	1	5	393	481	−88	7		62–73	71–98	69–74	—

Source: FIBA
Rules for classification: 1) Points; 2) Head-to-head results; 3) Points difference; 4) Points scored.

===== Group C =====
Pos	Team	Pld	W	L	PF	PA	PD	Pts	Qualification	United States	Puerto Rico	Mexico	Cuba
1	United States	6	5	1	506	396	+110	11	Second round	—	83–75	91–55	84–48
2	Puerto Rico	6	4	2	516	479	+37	10	Second round	78–85	—	84–79	84–80
3	Mexico	6	3	3	439	463	−24	9	Second round	78–70	80–100	—	72–66
4	Cuba	6	0	6	380	503	−123	6		62–93	72–95	52–75	—

Source: FIBA
Rules for classification: 1) Points; 2) Head-to-head results; 3) Points difference; 4) Points scored.

===== Group D =====
Pos	Team	Pld	W	L	PF	PA	PD	Pts	Qualification	Canada	Dominican Republic	United States Virgin Islands	Bahamas
1	Canada	6	5	1	596	443	+153	11	Second round	—	97–61	99–69	93–69
2	Dominican Republic	6	4	2	539	493	+46	10	Second round	88–76	—	99–89	82–83
3	Virgin Islands	6	2	4	509	588	−79	8	Second round	89–118	85–113	—	84–74
4	Bahamas	6	1	5	441	561	−120	7		67–113	63–96	85–93	—

Source: FIBA
Rules for classification: 1) Points; 2) Head-to-head results; 3) Points difference; 4) Points scored.

==== Second round ====
===== Group E =====
Pos	Team	Pld	W	L	PF	PA	PD	Pts	Qualification	United States	Argentina	Puerto Rico	Uruguay	Mexico	Panama
1	United States	12	10	2	1034	814	+220	22	2019 FIBA Basketball World Cup	—	84–83	83–75	114–57	91–55	111–80
2	Argentina	12	9	3	1037	854	+183	21	2019 FIBA Basketball World Cup	80–63	—	106–84	83–88	85–71	87–62
3	Puerto Rico	12	8	4	967	939	+28	20	2019 FIBA Basketball World Cup	78–85	87–86 (OT)	—	65–61	84–79	82–73
4	Uruguay	12	6	6	824	909	−85	18		70–78	58–102	64–62	—	63–60	86–73
5	Mexico	12	5	7	875	903	−28	17		78–70	74–78	80–100	88–77	—	78–61
6	Panama	12	4	8	844	930	−86	16		48–78	59–68	70–71	86–75	76–65	—

Source: FIBA
Rules for classification: 1) Points; 2) Head-to-head results; 3) Points difference; 4) Points scored.

===== Group F =====
Pos	Team	Pld	W	L	PF	PA	PD	Pts	Qualification	Canada	Venezuela	Brazil	Dominican Republic	Chile	United States Virgin Islands
1	Canada	12	10	2	1115	833	+282	22	2019 FIBA Basketball World Cup	—	95–55	85–77	97–61	85–46	99–69
2	Venezuela	12	9	3	886	838	+48	21 (Note: Venezuela 1–1, +4 PD; Brazil 1–1, –4 PD)	2019 FIBA Basketball World Cup	84–76	—	72–56	79–78	77–56	87–73
3	Brazil	12	9	3	918	787	+131	21	2019 FIBA Basketball World Cup	67–94	72–60	—	100–82	83–58	20–0 (Note: Virgin Islands did not arrive timely to play against Brazil and game was forfeited.)
4	Dominican Republic	12	7	5	979	921	+58	19	2019 FIBA Basketball World Cup	88–76	72–67	63–71	—	71–46	99–89
5	Chile	12	2	10	737	897	−160	14 (Note: Chile 1–1, +16 PD; Virgin Islands 1–1, –16 PD)		61–84	51–70	73–86	65–74	—	81–63
6	Virgin Islands (Note: The Virgin Islands do not receive a point for the forfeit loss to Brazil)	12	3	9	865	1016	−151	14		89–118	76–77	80–104	85–113	64–59	—

Source: FIBA
Rules for classification: 1) Points; 2) Head-to-head results; 3) Points difference; 4) Points scored.

===== Best fourth placed team =====
Pos	Grp	Team	Pld	W	L	PF	PA	PD	Pts	Qualification
1	F	Dominican Republic	12	7	5	979	921	+58	19	2019 FIBA Basketball World Cup
2	E	Uruguay	12	6	6	824	909	−85	18	

Source: FIBA

=== FIBA Asia and FIBA Oceania ===
All 16 teams which qualified for the 2017 FIBA Asia Cup played in the Asian qualification round of the 2019 FIBA World Cup, which included teams from FIBA Oceania.

==== First round ====
===== Group A =====
Pos	Team	Pld	W	L	PF	PA	PD	Pts	Qualification	New Zealand	South Korea	People's Republic of China	Hong Kong
1	New Zealand	6	5	1	579	439	+140	11	Second round	—	80–86	67–57	124–65
2	South Korea	6	4	2	530	502	+28	10	Second round	84–93	—	81–92	93–72
3	China	6	3	3	503	414	+89	9	Second round	73–82	74–82	—	96–44
4	Hong Kong	6	0	6	404	661	−257	6		74–133	91–104	58–111	—

Source: FIBA
Rules for classification: 1) Points; 2) Head-to-head results; 3) Points difference; 4) Points scored.

===== Group B =====
Pos	Team	Pld	W	L	PF	PA	PD	Pts	Qualification	Australia	Philippines	Japan	Chinese Taipei for Olympic games
1	Australia	6	5	1	525	392	+133	11	Second round	—	84–68	82–58	88–68
2	Philippines	6	4	2	470	482	−12	10	Second round	53–89	—	89–84	90–83
3	Japan	6	2	4	469	464	+5	8	Second round	79–78	71–77	—	69–70
4	Chinese Taipei	6	1	5	426	552	−126	7		66–104	71–93	68–108	—

Source: FIBA
Rules for classification: 1) Points; 2) Head-to-head results; 3) Points difference; 4) Points scored.

Australia defeated Philippines by default following a brawl left Philippines with only 1 player on court

===== Group C =====
Pos	Team	Pld	W	L	PF	PA	PD	Pts	Qualification	Jordan	Lebanon	United Arab Republic	India
1	Jordan	6	5	1	575	452	+123	11 (Note: Jordan 1–1, +3 PD; Lebanon 1–1, –3 PD)	Second round	—	87–83	87–62	114–70
2	Lebanon	6	5	1	531	398	+133	11	Second round	77–76	—	87–50	107–72
3	Syria	6	2	4	402	503	−101	8	Second round	72–109	63–87	—	81–76
4	India	6	0	6	413	568	−155	6		88–102	50–90	57–74	—

Source: FIBA
Rules for classification: 1) Points; 2) Head-to-head results; 3) Points difference; 4) Points scored.

===== Group D =====
Pos	Team	Pld	W	L	PF	PA	PD	Pts	Qualification	Iran	Kazakhstan	Qatar	Iraq
1	Iran	6	5	1	454	351	+103	11	Second round	—	88–56	65–39	83–53
2	Kazakhstan	6	3	3	420	436	−16	9	Second round	54–75	—	96–63	82–76
3	Qatar	6	2	4	408	465	−57	8 (Note: Qatar 2–0; Iraq 0–2)	Second round	75–77	70–82	—	84–79
4	Iraq	6	2	4	412	442	−30	8		74–66	64–50	66–77	—

Source: FIBA
Rules for classification: 1) Points. 2) Head-to-head results. 3) Points difference. 4) Points scored.

==== Second round ====
===== Group E =====
Pos	Team	Pld	W	L	PF	PA	PD	Pts	Qualification	New Zealand	South Korea	Jordan	People's Republic of China	Lebanon	United Arab Republic
1	New Zealand	12	10	2	1090	861	+229	22 (Note: New Zealand 1–1, +3 PD; South Korea 1–1, –3 PD)	2019 FIBA Basketball World Cup	—	80–86	95–69	67–57	63–60	97–74
2	South Korea	12	10	2	1062	927	+135	22	2019 FIBA Basketball World Cup	84–93	—	88–67	81–92	84–71	103–66
3	Jordan	12	7	5	1037	951	+86	19 (Note: Jordan 1–1, +15 PD; China 1–1, –15 PD)	2019 FIBA Basketball World Cup	86–80	75–86	—	86–62	87–83	87–62
4	China (Note: China qualified as the host nation, and to determine the final standings of the Asian Qualifiers, China was not included. However all results related to the previous games of China in the relevant group were taken into account for the final standings.)	12	7	5	1004	834	+170	19	2019 FIBA Basketball World Cup as host	73–82	74–82	88–79	—	72–52	101–52
5	Lebanon	12	6	6	945	858	+87	18		67–69	72–84	77–76	92–88 (OT)	—	87–50
6	Syria	12	2	10	793	1088	−295	14		66–107	74–87	72–109	59–90	63–87	—

Source: FIBA
Rules for classification: 1) Points; 2) Head-to-head results; 3) Points difference; 4) Points scored.

===== Group F =====
Pos	Team	Pld	W	L	PF	PA	PD	Pts	Qualification	Australia	Japan	Iran	Philippines	Kazakhstan	Qatar
1	Australia	12	10	2	1055	727	+328	22	2019 FIBA Basketball World Cup	—	82–58	76–47	84–68	94–41	110–59
2	Japan	12	8	4	988	844	+144	20 (Note: Japan 2–0; Iran 0–2)	2019 FIBA Basketball World Cup	79–78	—	70–56	71–77	86–70	85–47
3	Iran	12	8	4	890	811	+79	20	2019 FIBA Basketball World Cup	85–74	89–97	—	81–73	88–56	65–39
4	Philippines	12	7	5	970	935	+35	19	2019 FIBA Basketball World Cup	53–89	89–84	70–78	—	88–92	92–81
5	Kazakhstan	12	4	8	828	963	−135	16		60–81	70–85	54–75	75–93	—	96–63
6	Qatar	12	2	10	732	1027	−295	14		43–95	48–96	75–77	46–84	70–82	—

Source: FIBA
Rules for classification: 1) Points; 2) Head-to-head results; 3) Points difference; 4) Points scored.

===== Best fourth placed team =====
Pos	Grp	Team	Pld	W	L	PF	PA	PD	Pts	Qualification
1	F	Philippines	12	7	5	970	935	+35	19	2019 FIBA Basketball World Cup
2	E	Lebanon	12	6	6	945	858	+87	18	(Note: China, the fourth placers of Group E already qualified as the host nation, and to determine the final standings of the Asian Qualifiers, China was not included. However all results related to the previous games of China in the relevant group were taken into account for the final standings. Lebanon, the fifth placers, were considered as fourth placers for the purpose of determining the team that qualified as the best fourth placed team.)

Source: FIBA

=== FIBA Europe ===
==== Pre-qualified teams (24 of 32 Teams) ====
- Belgium
- Croatia
- Czech Republic
- Finland
- France
- Georgia
- Germany
- Great Britain
- Greece
- Hungary
- Iceland
- Israel
- Italy
- Latvia
- Lithuania
- Montenegro
- Poland
- Romania
- Russia
- Serbia
- Slovenia
- Spain
- Turkey
- Ukraine

==== European Pre-Qualifiers ====
The 24 national teams that qualified for EuroBasket 2017 had also qualified for Division A of FIBA Basketball World Cup Qualifying. The last eight teams qualified through the FIBA Basketball World Cup 2019 European Pre-Qualifiers which were held in August 2017.

In order to determine the last eight spots in Division A, 13 teams participated in four home-and-away round robin groups on 2 to 19 August 2017. The draw to determine the 4 groups was held in Prague, Czech Republic on 10 December 2016.

===== Group A =====
Pos	Team	Pld	W	L	PF	PA	PD	Pts	Qualification	Sweden	Bosnia and Herzegovina	Armenia	Slovakia
1	Sweden	6	4	2	476	447	+29	10 (Note: Sweden 2–0, Bosnia and Herzegovina 0–2)	Advance to the first round	—	81–73	93–70	86–82
2	Bosnia and Herzegovina	6	4	2	502	465	+37	10	Advance to the first round	72–88	—	98–85	84–71
3	Armenia	6	3	3	470	482	−12	9	Relegated to the EuroBasket Pre-Qualifiers first round	82–69	66–83	—	75–61
4	Slovakia	6	1	5	434	488	−54	7	Relegated to the EuroBasket Pre-Qualifiers first round	68–59	74–92	78–92	—

Source: FIBA
Rules for classification: 1) Points; 2) Head-to-head results; 3) Points difference; 4) Points scored.

===== Group B =====
Pos	Team	Pld	W	L	PF	PA	PD	Pts	Qualification	Netherlands	Austria	Albania
1	Netherlands	4	3	1	352	264	+88	7	Advance to the first round	—	71–78	91–77
2	Austria	4	3	1	326	264	+62	7	Advance to the first round	72–79	—	97–63
3	Albania	4	0	4	228	378	−150	4	Relegated to the EuroBasket Pre-Qualifiers first round	37–111	51–79	—

Source: FIBA
Rules for classification: 1) Points; 2) Head-to-head results; 3) Points difference; 4) Points scored.

===== Group C =====
Pos	Team	Pld	W	L	PF	PA	PD	Pts	Qualification	Estonia	Kosovo	North Macedonia
1	Estonia	4	3	1	299	266	+33	7	Advance to the first round	—	76–50	74–65
2	Kosovo	4	2	2	271	300	−29	6	Advance to the first round	75–69	—	72–68
3	Macedonia	4	1	3	296	300	−4	5	Relegated to the EuroBasket Pre-Qualifiers first round	76–80	87–74	—

Source: FIBA
Rules for classification: 1) Points; 2) Head-to-head results; 3) Points difference; 4) Points scored.

===== Group D =====
Pos	Team	Pld	W	L	PF	PA	PD	Pts	Qualification	Bulgaria	Belarus	Portugal
1	Bulgaria	4	4	0	335	274	+61	8	Advance to the first round	—	78–68	91–65
2	Belarus	4	1	3	294	316	−22	5 (Note: Belarus 1–1, +2, Portugal 1–1, –2)	Advance to the first round	70–84	—	78–75
3	Portugal	4	1	3	290	329	−39	5	Advance to the EuroBasket Pre-Qualifiers first round	71–82	79–78	—

Source: FIBA
Rules for classification: 1) Points; 2) Head-to-head results; 3) Points difference; 4) Points scored.

==== First round ====
===== Group A =====
Pos	Team	Pld	W	L	PF	PA	PD	Pts	Qualification	Spain	Montenegro	Slovenia	Belarus
1	Spain	6	6	0	497	431	+66	12	Advance to the second round	—	79–67	92–84	80–60
2	Montenegro	6	3	3	454	443	+11	9	Advance to the second round	66–79	—	63–75	80–69
3	Slovenia	6	2	4	484	492	−8	8	Advance to the second round	72–83	74–87	—	87–74
4	Belarus	6	1	5	445	514	−69	7	Relegated to the EuroBasket Pre-Qualifiers second round	82–84	67–91	93–92	—

Source: FIBA
Rules for classification: 1) Points; 2) Head-to-head results; 3) Points difference; 4) Points scored.

===== Group B =====
Pos	Team	Pld	W	L	PF	PA	PD	Pts	Qualification	Turkey	Latvia	Ukraine	Sweden
1	Turkey	6	4	2	437	389	+48	10 (Note: Turkey 1–1, +3, Latvia 1–1, –3)	Advance to the second round	—	85–73	80–66	77–52
2	Latvia	6	4	2	477	453	+24	10	Advance to the second round	79–70	—	68–82	82–73
3	Ukraine	6	3	3	440	450	−10	9	Advance to the second round	60–67	71–93	—	77–66
4	Sweden	6	1	5	398	460	−62	7	Relegated to the EuroBasket Pre-Qualifiers second round	59–58	72–82	76–84	—

Source: FIBA
Rules for classification: 1) Points; 2) Head-to-head results; 3) Points difference; 4) Points scored.

===== Group C =====
Pos	Team	Pld	W	L	PF	PA	PD	Pts	Qualification	Lithuania	Poland	Hungary	Kosovo
1	Lithuania	6	6	0	512	352	+160	12	Advance to the second round	—	75–55	80–75	106–50
2	Poland	6	3	3	436	410	+26	9 (Note: Poland 1–1, +3; Hungary 1–1, –3)	Advance to the second round	61–79	—	70–60	90–62
3	Hungary	6	3	3	414	421	−7	9	Advance to the second round	50–73	64–57	—	84–76
4	Kosovo	6	0	6	384	563	−179	6	Relegated to the EuroBasket Pre-Qualifiers second round	61–99	70–103	65–81	—

Source: FIBA
Rules for classification: 1) Points; 2) Head-to-head results; 3) Points difference; 4) Points scored.

===== Group D =====
Pos	Team	Pld	W	L	PF	PA	PD	Pts	Qualification	Italy	Netherlands	Croatia	Romania
1	Italy	6	4	2	474	405	+69	10	Advance to the second round	—	80–62	72–78	75–70
2	Netherlands	6	3	3	434	416	+18	9 (Note: Netherlands 1–1, +3; Croatia 1–1, –3)	Advance to the second round	81–66	—	68–61	77–52
3	Croatia	6	3	3	431	419	+12	9	Advance to the second round	64–80	82–78	—	56–58
4	Romania	6	2	4	368	467	−99	8	Relegated to the EuroBasket Pre-Qualifiers second round	50–101	75–68	63–90	—

Source: FIBA
Rules for classification: 1) Points; 2) Head-to-head results; 3) Points difference; 4) Points scored.

===== Group E =====
Pos	Team	Pld	W	L	PF	PA	PD	Pts	Qualification	France	Russia	Bosnia and Herzegovina	Belgium
1	France	6	6	0	479	377	+102	12	Advance to the second round	—	75–74	84–65	64–49
2	Russia	6	3	3	458	428	+30	9	Advance to the second round	78–84	—	70–53	76–69
3	Bosnia and Herzegovina	6	2	4	400	481	−81	8	Advance to the second round	52–102	81–76	—	72–70
4	Belgium	6	1	5	392	443	−51	7	Relegated to the EuroBasket Pre-Qualifiers second round	59–70	66–84	79–77	—

Source: FIBA
Rules for classification: 1) Points; 2) Head-to-head results; 3) Points difference; 4) Points scored.

===== Group F =====
Pos	Team	Pld	W	L	PF	PA	PD	Pts	Qualification	Czech Republic	Finland	Bulgaria	Iceland
1	Czech Republic	6	5	1	464	425	+39	11	Advance to the second round	—	77–73	81–75	89–69
2	Finland	6	3	3	453	449	+4	9	Advance to the second round	56–64	—	75–70	91–77
3	Bulgaria	6	2	4	466	476	−10	8 (Note: Bulgaria 2–0; Iceland 0–2)	Advance to the second round	76–78	80–82	—	88–86
4	Iceland	6	2	4	463	496	−33	8	Relegated to the EuroBasket Pre-Qualifiers second round	76–75	81–76	74–77	—

Source: FIBA
Rules for classification: 1) Points; 2) Head-to-head results; 3) Points difference; 4) Points scored.

===== Group G =====
Pos	Team	Pld	W	L	PF	PA	PD	Pts	Qualification	Germany	Serbia	Georgia	Austria
1	Germany	6	6	0	508	414	+94	12	Advance to the second round	—	79–74	79–70	85–63
2	Serbia	6	4	2	514	449	+65	10	Advance to the second round	81–88	—	105–87	85–64
3	Georgia	6	2	4	460	495	−35	8	Advance to the second round	77–87	50–87	—	98–73
4	Austria	6	0	6	394	518	−124	6	Relegated to the EuroBasket Pre-Qualifiers second round	49–90	81–82	64–78	—

Source: FIBA
Rules for classification: 1) Points; 2) Head-to-head results; 3) Points difference; 4) Points scored.

===== Group H =====
Pos	Team	Pld	W	L	PF	PA	PD	Pts	Qualification	Greece	Israel	Estonia	United Kingdom
1	Greece	6	6	0	513	432	+81	12	Advance to the second round	—	82–61	87–75	75–70
2	Israel	6	3	3	438	458	−20	9	Advance to the second round	78–96	—	88–68	82–75
3	Estonia	6	2	4	415	459	−44	8	Advance to the second round	56–78	78–62	—	73–70
4	Great Britain	6	1	5	440	457	−17	7	Relegated to the EuroBasket Pre-Qualifiers second round	92–95	59–67	74–65	—

Source: FIBA
Rules for classification: 1) Points; 2) Head-to-head results; 3) Points difference; 4) Points scored.

==== Second round ====
===== Group I =====
Pos	Team	Pld	W	L	PF	PA	PD	Pts	Qualification	Spain	Turkey	Montenegro	Latvia	Ukraine	Slovenia
1	Spain	12	10	2	927	848	+79	22	Qualification to the FIBA Basketball World Cup	—	74–58	79–67	85–82	72–68	92–84
2	Turkey	12	8	4	874	805	+69	20	Qualification to the FIBA Basketball World Cup	71–67	—	79–69	85–73	80–66	77–58
3	Montenegro	12	7	5	918	901	+17	19 (Note: Montenegro 1–1, +3 PD; Latvia 1–1, –3 PD)	Qualification to the FIBA Basketball World Cup	66–79	71–66	—	74–80	90–84	63–75
4	Latvia	12	7	5	943	914	+29	19	Qualification to the EuroBasket Qualifiers	62–67	79–70	75–84	—	68–82	85–74
5	Ukraine	12	5	7	909	892	+17	17	Qualification to the EuroBasket Qualifiers	76–65	60–67	74–76	71–93	—	82–54
6	Slovenia	12	3	9	908	988	−80	15	Qualification to the EuroBasket Qualifiers	72–83	58–77	74–87	77–82	85–84 (OT)	—

Source: FIBA
Rules for classification: 1) Points; 2) Head-to-head results; 3) Points difference; 4) Points scored.

===== Group J =====
Pos	Team	Pld	W	L	PF	PA	PD	Pts	Qualification	Lithuania	Italy	Poland	Hungary	Croatia	Netherlands
1	Lithuania	12	11	1	999	802	+197	23	Qualification to the FIBA Basketball World Cup	—	86–73	75–55	80–75	79–62	95–93 (OT)
2	Italy	12	8	4	940	836	+104	20 (Note: Italy 1–1, +3 PD; Poland 1–1, –3 PD)	Qualification to the FIBA Basketball World Cup	70–65	—	101–82	75–41	72–78	80–62
3	Poland	12	8	4	958	886	+72	20	Qualification to the FIBA Basketball World Cup	61–79	94–78	—	70–60	79–74	85–76
4	Hungary	12	6	6	836	849	−13	18	Qualification to the EuroBasket Qualifiers	50–73	63–69	64–57	—	84–65	91–86 (OT)
5	Croatia	12	4	8	858	891	−33	16	Qualification to the EuroBasket Qualifiers	83–84	64–80	69–77	74–69	—	82–78
6	Netherlands	12	3	9	895	944	−49	15	Qualification to the EuroBasket Qualifiers	69–78	81–66	78–105	59–74	68–61	—

Source: FIBA
Rules for classification: 1) Points; 2) Head-to-head results; 3) Points difference; 4) Points scored.

===== Group K =====
Pos	Team	Pld	W	L	PF	PA	PD	Pts	Qualification	(France)	(Russia)	(Czech Republic)	Finland	Bulgaria	(Bosnia and Herzegovina)
1	France	12	10	2	937	778	+159	22	Qualification to the FIBA Basketball World Cup	—	75–74	82–66	83–67	77–53	84–65
2	Russia	12	8	4	966	853	+113	20 (Note: Russia 1–1, +18 PD; Czech Republic 1–1, –18 PD)	Qualification to the FIBA Basketball World Cup	78–84	—	81–61	91–76	77–73	70–53
3	Czech Republic	12	8	4	890	889	+1	20	Qualification to the FIBA Basketball World Cup	65–79	80–78	—	77–73	81–75	69–64
4	Finland	12	6	6	913	927	−14	18	Qualification to the EuroBasket Qualifiers	76–69	75–77 (OT)	56–64	—	75–70	85–81
5	Bulgaria	12	4	8	882	971	−89	16	Qualification to the EuroBasket Qualifiers	74–68	60–104	76–78	80–82	—	89–82
6	Bosnia and Herzegovina	12	3	9	871	957	−86	15	Qualification to the EuroBasket Qualifiers	52–102	81–76	80–85	77–81	87–67	—

Source: FIBA
Rules for classification: 1) Points; 2) Head-to-head results; 3) Points difference; 4) Points scored.

===== Group L =====
Pos	Team	Pld	W	L	PF	PA	PD	Pts	Qualification	Greece	Germany	Serbia	Georgia	Israel	Estonia
1	Greece	12	11	1	972	880	+92	23	Qualification to the FIBA Basketball World Cup	—	92–84	70–63	81–69	82–61	87–75
2	Germany	12	9	3	1017	867	+150	21	Qualification to the FIBA Basketball World Cup	63–69	—	79–74	79–70	112–98 (OT)	87–70
3	Serbia	12	7	5	993	875	+118	19	Qualification to the FIBA Basketball World Cup	84–61	81–88	—	105–87	97–76	91–65
4	Georgia	12	5	7	927	968	−41	17 (Note: Georgia 2–0; Israel 0–2)	Qualification to the EuroBasket Qualifiers	85–86	77–87	50–87	—	71–69 (OT)	77–84
5	Israel	12	5	7	925	974	−49	17	Qualification to the EuroBasket Qualifiers	78–96	81–77	83–74	80–85	—	88–68
6	Estonia	12	4	8	821	950	−129	16	Qualification to the EuroBasket Qualifiers	56–78	43–86	71–70	65–79	78–62	—

Source: FIBA
Rules for classification: 1) Points; 2) Head-to-head results; 3) Points difference; 4) Points scored.

== Statistical leaders ==
As of 25 February 2019

=== Player averages ===
Category	Player	Team	Average
Points	Nick Fazekas	Japan	27.2
Rebounds	Javier Justiz	Cuba	12.8
Assists	Jamar Wilson	Finland	6.4
Steals	Demario Mayfield	Iraq	3.3
Blocks	LaRon Smith	Virgin Islands	2.4
Efficiency	Ra Gun-ah	South Korea	34.0

=== Team averages ===
Category	Team	Average
Points	Canada	92.9
Rebounds	DR Congo	45.3
Assists	South Korea	23.3
Steals	Iraq	12.8
Blocks	DR Congo; Lebanon	4.5
Efficiency	Canada	113.8
