= AfroBasket =

Men's basketball continental championship

FIBA AfroBasket
- Most recent season or competition: FIBA AfroBasket 2025
- Formerly: FIBA Africa Championship
- Sport: Basketball
- Founded: 1962; 64 years ago
- First season: 1962
- No. of teams: 16
- Country: FIBA Africa member nations
- Continent: Africa
- Most recent champion: Angola (12th title)
- Most titles: Angola (12 titles)
- Related competitions: AfroBasket Women
- Website: FIBA Africa

The AfroBasket (alternatively known as the FIBA Africa Championship, FIBA African Championship, or FIBA AfroBasket) is the men's basketball continental championship contested by the senior national teams of Africa, played once every four years.

Through the 2015 edition, the tournament took place every two years and also served as a qualifying tournament for the FIBA World Cup and the Summer Olympic Games. Since 2017, however, the AfroBasket along with all other men's FIBA continental championships are no longer a part of the qualifying process for the World Cup or the Olympics.

== Qualification ==
Sixteen African teams qualify for the finals tournament. Before the 2021 edition, the qualification format for teams was via the different FIBA Africa subzones from Zone 1 to Zone 7. Each subzone conducted a qualification tournament a year before the championship to determine the qualifying teams. Six subzones received two berths each, while Zone 1 only received one. The host and the champion from the preceding AfroBasket also got a berth each, while two or three teams were selected as wild cards. However, beginning with the 2021 tournament, FIBA changed the qualification format where wild cards are no longer given and the preceding champion is no longer guaranteed an automatic berth. All teams now have to enter the qualification process. While teams who fail to qualify for the prior AfroBasket will go through pre-qualifiers for the opportunity to reach the next AfroBasket competition.

== Summaries ==
| Year | Hosts | Final | | | Third place match | | |
| Year | Hosts | Champions | Score | Runners–up | Third place | Score | Fourth place |
|---|---|---|---|---|---|---|---|
| 1962; Details | (Egypt); Cairo | United Arab Rep. | 66–42 | Sudan | Morocco | 44–41 | Guinea |
| 1964; Details | (Morocco); Casablanca | United Arab Rep. | 69–57 | Morocco | Palestine | 53–51 | Tunisia |
| 1965; Details | (Tunisia); Tunis | Morocco | 70–57 | Tunisia | Algeria | 57–46 | Senegal |
| 1968; Details | (Morocco); Casablanca | Senegal | 67–60 | Morocco | Central African Rep. | 76–60 | Mali |
| 1970; Details | (Egypt); Alexandria | United Arab Rep. | 70–63 | Senegal | Tunisia | 76–56 | Central African Rep. |
| 1972; Details | (Senegal); Dakar | Senegal | 61–54 | Egypt | Mali | 107–74 | Central African Rep. |
| 1974; Details | (Central African Republic); Bangui | Central African Rep. | 72–67 | Senegal | Tunisia | 82–72 | Cameroon |
| 1975; Details | (Egypt); Alexandria | Egypt | 70–61 | Senegal | Sudan | 81–78 | Zaire |
| 1978; Details | (Senegal); Dakar | Senegal | 103–72 | Ivory Coast | Egypt | 2–0 | Sudan |
| 1980; Details | (Morocco); Rabat | Senegal | 96–90 | Ivory Coast | Morocco | 97–83 | Algeria |
| 1981; Details | (Somalia); Mogadishu | Ivory Coast | 81–65 | Egypt | Somalia | 2–0 | Algeria |
| 1983; Details | (Egypt); Alexandria | Egypt | 94–68 | Angola | Senegal | 78–71 | Ivory Coast |
| 1985; Details | (Ivory Coast); Abidjan | Ivory Coast | 84–73 | Angola | Egypt | 74–73 | Senegal |
| 1987; Details | (Tunisia); Tunis | Central African Rep. | 94–87 | Egypt | Angola | 73–71 | Mali |
| 1989; Details | (Angola); Luanda | Angola | 89–62 | Egypt | Senegal | 65–53 | Mali |
| 1992; Details | (Egypt); Cairo | Angola | 71–66 | Senegal | Egypt | 97–81 | Mali |
| 1993; Details | (Kenya); Nairobi | Angola | 69–61 | Egypt | Senegal | 90–76 | Kenya |
| 1995; Details | (Algeria); Algiers | Angola | 68–55 | Senegal | Nigeria | 58–51 | Algeria |
| 1997; Details | (Senegal); Dakar | Senegal | 69–48 | Nigeria | Angola | 79–55 | Egypt |
| 1999; Details | (Angola); Luanda & Cabinda | Angola | 79–72 | Nigeria | Egypt | 75–63 | Mali |
| 2001; Details | (Morocco); Casablanca | Angola | 78–68 | Algeria | Egypt | 77–71 | Tunisia |
| 2003; Details | (Egypt); Alexandria | Angola | 85–65 | Nigeria | Egypt | 81–79 | Senegal |
| 2005; Details | (Algeria); Algiers | Angola | 70–61 | Senegal | Nigeria | 88–76 | Algeria |
| 2007; Details | Angola | Angola | 86–72 | Cameroon | Cape Verde | 53–51 | Egypt |
| 2009; Details | (Libya); Tripoli & Benghazi | Angola | 82–72 | Ivory Coast | Tunisia | 83–68 | Cameroon |
| 2011; Details | (Madagascar); Antananarivo | Tunisia | 67–56 | Angola | Nigeria | 77–67 | Ivory Coast |
| 2013; Details | (Ivory Coast); Abidjan | Angola | 57–40 | Egypt | Senegal | 57–56 | Ivory Coast |
| 2015; Details | (Tunisia); Tunis | Nigeria | 74–65 | Angola | Tunisia | 82–73 | Senegal |
| 2017; Details | (Senegal) (Tunisia); Dakar & Tunis | Tunisia | 77–65 | Nigeria | Senegal | 73–62 | Morocco |
| 2021; Details | (Rwanda); Kigali | Tunisia | 78–75 | Ivory Coast | Senegal | 86–73 | Cape Verde |
| 2025; Details | Angola | Angola | 70–43 | Mali | Senegal | 98–72 | Cameroon |
| 2029; Details | TBD | | – | | | – | |

^n/a A round-robin tournament determined the final standings.

== Medal table ==
| Rank | Nation | Gold | Silver | Bronze | Total |
|---|---|---|---|---|---|
| 1 | Angola | 12 | 4 | 2 | 18 |
| 2 | Senegal | 5 | 6 | 7 | 18 |
| 3 | Egypt | 5 | 6 | 6 | 17 |
| 4 | Tunisia | 3 | 1 | 4 | 8 |
| 5 | Ivory Coast | 2 | 4 | 0 | 6 |
| 6 | Central African Rep. | 2 | 0 | 1 | 3 |
| 7 | Nigeria | 1 | 4 | 3 | 8 |
| 8 | Morocco | 1 | 2 | 2 | 5 |
| 9 | Algeria | 0 | 1 | 1 | 2 |
| 9 | Mali | 0 | 1 | 1 | 2 |
| 9 | Sudan | 0 | 1 | 1 | 2 |
| 12 | Cameroon | 0 | 1 | 0 | 1 |
| 13 | Cape Verde | 0 | 0 | 1 | 1 |
| 13 | Palestine | 0 | 0 | 1 | 1 |
| 13 | Somalia | 0 | 0 | 1 | 1 |
| Totals (15 entries) | | 31 | 31 | 31 | 93 |

== Tournament awards ==
Most recent award winners (2025)

The awards were announced on 24 August 2025.

All-Tournament Team
| Guards | Forwards | Center |
|---|---|---|
| (Angola) Childe Dundão (Senegal) Brancou Badio | (Mali) Mahamane Coulibaly (Angola) Bruno Fernando | (Mali) Aliou Diarra |
MVP: (Angola) Childe Dundão

== Participating nations ==
=== 20th century ===
| Nation | (Egypt) 1962 | (Morocco) 1964 | (Tunisia) 1965 | (Morocco) 1968 | (Egypt) 1970 | (Senegal) 1972 | (Central African Republic) 1974 | (Egypt) 1975 | (Senegal) 1978 | (Morocco) 1980 | (Somalia) 1981 | (Egypt) 1983 | (Ivory Coast) 1985 | (Tunisia) 1987 | (Angola) 1989 | (Egypt) 1992 | (Kenya) 1993 | (Algeria) 1995 | (Senegal) 1997 | (Angola) 1999 |
|---|---|---|---|---|---|---|---|---|---|---|---|---|---|---|---|---|---|---|---|---|
| Algeria | – | – | 3rd | 7th | – | – | – | – | – | 4th | 4th | 6th | – | 9th | 6th | 9th | 5th | 4th | – | 6th |
| Angola | – | – | – | – | – | – | – | – | – | 7th | 8th | 2nd | 2nd | 3rd | 1st | 1st | 1st | 1st | 3rd | 1st |
| Benin | – | – | – | – | – | – | 9th | – | – | – | – | – | – | – | – | – | – | – | – | – |
| Burkina Faso | – | – | – | – | – | – | – | – | – | – | – | – | – | – | – | – | – | – | – | – |
| Cameroon | – | – | – | – | – | 8th | 4th | – | – | – | – | – | – | – | – | 8th | – | – | – | – |
| Cape Verde | – | – | – | – | – | – | – | – | – | – | – | – | – | – | – | – | – | – | 7th | 9th |
| CA Republic | – | – | – | 3rd | 4th | 4th | 1st | – | – | – | – | 7th | 5th | 1st | 7th | 6th | – | – | 5th | – |
| Chad | – | – | – | – | – | – | – | – | – | – | – | – | – | – | – | – | – | – | – | – |
| Congo | – | – | – | 9th | – | – | – | 6th | – | 5th | 7th | – | 10th | – | – | – | – | – | – | – |
| DR Congo | – | – | – | – | – | – | 6th | 4th | – | 6th | – | – | – | – | – | – | – | 9th | – | – |
| Egypt | 1st | 1st | – | – | 1st | 2nd | – | 1st | 3rd | – | 2nd | 1st | 3rd | 2nd | 2nd | 3rd | 2nd | – | 4th | 3rd |
| Ethiopia | 5th | – | – | – | – | – | – | – | – | – | – | – | – | – | – | – | – | – | – | – |
| Gabon | – | – | – | – | – | – | – | – | – | – | – | – | – | – | – | – | 9th | – | – | – |
| Gambia | – | – | – | – | – | – | – | – | 9th | – | – | – | – | – | – | – | – | – | – | – |
| Guinea | 4th | – | – | – | – | – | – | – | – | 10th | – | 10th | 11th | – | – | – | – | – | – | – |
| Ivory Coast | – | – | – | 5th | – | 10th | – | – | 2nd | 2nd | 1st | 4th | 1st | 7th | 5th | 11th | 6th | 7th | 8th | 8th |
| Kenya | – | – | – | – | – | – | – | – | – | – | – | – | 12th | – | 11th | – | 4th | – | – | – |
| Liberia | – | – | – | – | – | – | – | – | – | – | – | 9th | – | – | – | – | – | – | – | – |
| Libya | – | – | 5th | – | 5th | – | – | – | 10th | – | – | – | – | – | – | – | – | – | – | – |
| Madagascar | – | – | – | – | – | 9th | – | – | – | – | – | – | – | – | – | – | – | – | – | – |
| Mali | – | 6th | – | 4th | – | 3rd | 7th | – | – | – | – | – | – | 4th | 4th | 4th | 7th | 5th | 6th | 4th |
| Mauritania | – | – | – | – | – | – | – | – | 7th | 8th | 9th | – | 6th | – | – | – | – | – | – | – |
| Morocco | 3rd | 2nd | 1st | 2nd | – | 7th | – | – | 5th | 3rd | – | – | – | – | 9th | 10th | – | 6th | – | 11th |
| Mozambique | – | – | – | – | – | – | – | – | – | – | 10th | 5th | 9th | – | – | – | – | 8th | – | 10th |
| Niger | – | – | – | 8th | – | – | – | – | – | – | – | – | – | – | – | – | – | – | – | – |
| Nigeria | – | – | – | – | – | 12th | – | – | 6th | 11th | – | – | 7th | 8th | – | 5th | – | 3rd | 2nd | 2nd |
| Palestine | – | 3rd | – | – | 6th | – | – | – | – | – | – | – | – | – | – | – | – | – | – | – |
| Rwanda | – | – | – | – | – | – | – | – | – | – | – | – | – | – | – | – | – | – | – | – |
| Senegal | – | 5th | 4th | 1st | 2nd | 1st | 2nd | 2nd | 1st | 1st | 5th | 3rd | 4th | 6th | 3rd | 2nd | 3rd | 2nd | 1st | 7th |
| Somalia | – | – | – | – | 7th | – | 10th | – | – | 9th | 3rd | 8th | – | – | – | – | – | – | – | – |
| South Africa | – | – | – | – | – | – | – | – | – | – | – | – | – | – | – | – | – | – | 9th | 12th |
| South Sudan | – | – | – | – | – | – | – | – | – | – | – | – | – | – | – | – | – | – | – | – |
| Sudan | 2nd | – | – | 6th | – | 6th | – | 3rd | 4th | – | – | – | – | – | – | – | – | – | – | – |
| Tanzania | – | – | – | – | – | – | 8th | – | – | – | – | – | – | – | – | – | – | – | – | – |
| Togo | – | – | – | – | – | 11th | 5th | – | 8th | – | – | – | – | – | – | – | – | – | – | – |
| Tunisia | – | 4th | 2nd | – | 3rd | 5th | 3rd | 5th | – | – | 6th | – | 8th | 5th | 8th | 7th | 8th | – | – | 5th |
| Uganda | – | – | – | – | – | – | – | – | – | – | – | – | – | – | – | – | – | – | – | – |
| Zambia | – | – | – | – | – | – | – | – | – | – | – | – | – | – | 10th | – | – | – | – | – |
| Zimbabwe | – | – | – | – | – | – | – | – | – | – | 11th | – | – | – | – | – | – | – | – | – |
| Teams | 5 | 6 | 5 | 9 | 7 | 12 | 10 | 6 | 10 | 11 | 11 | 10 | 12 | 9 | 11 | 11 | 9 | 9 | 9 | 12 |

=== 21st century ===
| Nation | (Morocco) 2001 | (Egypt) 2003 | (Algeria) 2005 | (Angola) 2007 | (Libya) 2009 | (Madagascar) 2011 | (Ivory Coast) 2013 | (Tunisia) 2015 | (Tunisia) (Senegal) 2017 | (Rwanda) 2021 | (Angola) 2025 | (N/A) 2029 | Total |
|---|---|---|---|---|---|---|---|---|---|---|---|---|---|
| Algeria | 2nd | 7th | 4th | – | – | – | 12th | 6th | – | – | – | | 16 |
| Angola | 1st | 1st | 1st | 1st | 1st | 2nd | 1st | 2nd | 7th | 5th | 1st | | 22 |
| Benin | – | – | – | – | – | – | – | – | – | – | – | | 1 |
| Burkina Faso | – | – | – | – | – | – | 16th | – | – | – | – | | 1 |
| Cameroon | – | – | – | 2nd | 4th | 7th | 5th | 9th | 5th | 16th | 4th | | 11 |
| Cape Verde | – | – | – | 3rd | 13th | – | 6th | 10th | – | 4th | 8th | | 8 |
| CA Republic | 9th | 5th | 5th | 7th | 6th | 6th | 13th | 14th | 11th | 14th | – | | 20 |
| Chad | – | – | – | – | – | 15th | – | – | – | – | – | | 1 |
| Congo | – | – | – | – | 16th | – | 14th | – | – | – | – | | 7 |
| DR Congo | – | – | – | 15th | – | – | – | – | 6th | 13th | 11th | | 8 |
| Egypt | 3rd | 3rd | – | 4th | 10th | 11th | 2nd | 5th | 8th | 11th | 6th | | 25 |
| Ethiopia | – | – | – | – | – | – | – | – | – | – | – | | 1 |
| Gabon | – | – | 9th | – | – | – | – | 8th | – | – | – | | 3 |
| Gambia | – | – | – | – | – | – | – | – | – | – | – | | 1 |
| Guinea | – | – | – | – | – | – | – | – | 16th | 8th | 9th | | 7 |
| Ivory Coast | 8th | 11th | 10th | 8th | 2nd | 4th | 4th | 12th | 14th | 2nd | 7th | | 25 |
| Kenya | – | – | – | – | – | – | – | – | – | 9th | – | | 4 |
| Liberia | – | – | – | 16th | – | – | – | – | – | – | – | | 2 |
| Libya | – | – | – | – | 11th | – | – | – | – | – | 16th | | 5 |
| Madagascar | – | 12th | – | – | – | 13th | – | – | – | – | 14th | | 4 |
| Mali | 11th | – | 7th | 11th | 8th | 9th | 15th | 7th | 9th | 15th | 2nd | | 21 |
| Mauritania | – | – | – | – | – | – | – | – | – | – | – | | 4 |
| Morocco | 6th | 8th | 6th | 10th | 12th | 8th | 8th | 13th | 4th | – | – | | 20 |
| Mozambique | 10th | 10th | 11th | 14th | 14th | 10th | 11th | 11th | 12th | – | – | | 14 |
| Niger | – | – | – | – | – | – | – | – | – | – | – | | 1 |
| Nigeria | 5th | 2nd | 3rd | 5th | 5th | 3rd | 7th | 1st | 2nd | 12th | 5th | | 20 |
| Palestine | – | – | – | – | – | – | – | – | – | – | – | – | 2 |
| Rwanda | – | – | – | 12th | 9th | 12th | 10th | – | 10th | 10th | 13th | | 7 |
| Senegal | 7th | 4th | 2nd | 9th | 7th | 5th | 3rd | 4th | 3rd | 3rd | 3rd | | 30 |
| Somalia | – | – | – | – | – | – | – | – | – | – | – | | 5 |
| South Africa | 12th | 9th | 12th | 13th | 15th | 14th | – | – | 15th | – | – | | 9 |
| South Sudan | – | – | – | – | – | – | – | – | – | 7th | 10th | | 2 |
| Sudan | – | – | – | – | – | – | – | – | – | – | – | | 5 |
| Tanzania | – | – | – | – | – | – | – | – | – | – | – | | 1 |
| Togo | – | – | – | – | – | 16th | – | – | – | – | – | | 4 |
| Tunisia | 4th | 6th | 8th | 6th | 3rd | 1st | 9th | 3rd | 1st | 1st | 12th | | 24 |
| Uganda | – | – | – | – | – | – | – | 15th | 13th | 6th | 15th | | 4 |
| Zambia | – | – | – | – | – | – | – | – | – | – | – | | 1 |
| Zimbabwe | – | – | – | – | – | – | – | 16th | – | – | – | | 2 |
| Teams | 12 | 12 | 12 | 16 | 16 | 16 | 16 | 16 | 16 | 16 | 16 | 16 | |

== Debut of teams ==
A total of 39 national teams have appeared in at least one FIBA AfroBasket in the history of the tournament through the 2025 competition. Each successive AfroBasket has had at least one team appearing for the first time. Countries competing in their first AfroBasket are listed below by year.

| Year | Debutants | Number |
|---|---|---|
| 1962 | Egypt, Ethiopia, Guinea, Morocco, Sudan | 5 |
| 1964 | Mali, Palestine, Senegal, Tunisia | 9 |
| 1965 | Algeria, Libya | 11 |
| 1968 | Central African Republic, Congo, Ivory Coast, Niger, Togo | 16 |
| 1970 | Somalia | 17 |
| 1972 | Cameroon, Madagascar, Nigeria | 20 |
| 1974 | Benin, DR Congo, Tanzania | 23 |
| 1975 | None | 23 |
| 1978 | Gambia, Mauritania | 25 |
| 1980 | Angola | 26 |
| 1981 | Mozambique, Zimbabwe | 28 |
| 1983 | Liberia | 29 |
| 1985 | Kenya | 30 |
| 1987 | None | 30 |
| 1989 | Zambia | 31 |
| 1992 | None | 31 |
| 1993 | Gabon | 32 |
| 1995 | None | 32 |
| 1997 | Cape Verde, South Africa | 34 |
| 1999 | None | 34 |
| 2001 | None | 34 |
| 2003 | None | 34 |
| 2005 | None | 34 |
| 2007 | Rwanda | 35 |
| 2009 | None | 35 |
| 2011 | Chad | 36 |
| 2013 | Burkina Faso | 37 |
| 2015 | Uganda | 38 |
| 2017 | None | 38 |
| 2021 | South Sudan | 39 |
| 2025 | None | 39 |
| 2029 | TBD | 39 |
| Total | | 39 |

== Hosts ==
| Hosts | Editions hosted |
|---|---|
| Egypt | 6 (1962, 1970, 1975, 1983, 1992, 2003) |
| Angola | 4 (1989, 1999, 2007, 2025) |
| Tunisia | 4 (1965, 1987, 2015, 2017*) |
| Senegal | 4 (1972, 1978, 1997, 2017*) |
| Morocco | 4 (1964, 1968, 1980, 2001) |
| Ivory Coast | 2 (1985, 2013) |
| Algeria | 2 (1995, 2005) |
| Rwanda | 1 (2021) |
| Madagascar | 1 (2011) |
| Libya | 1 (2009) |
| Kenya | 1 (1993) |
| Somalia | 1 (1981) |
| Central African Republic | 1 (1974) |

- * Co-host
- italic: future host

== See also ==
- AfroCan
- FIBA Basketball World Cup
- Basketball at the Olympic Games
- Basketball at the African Games
- FIBA Africa Clubs Champions Cup
- FIBA U18 AfroBasket
- FIBA U16 AfroBasket
