= Mohamed Choua =

Moroccan basketball player (born 1992)

No. 9 – Rouen Métropole Basket
- Position: Forward / center
- League: LNB Pro B

Personal information
- Born: 25 December 1992 (age 33) Agadir, Morocco
- Listed height: 6 ft 8 in (2.03 m)

Career information
- Playing career: 2015–present

Career history
- 2015–2021: AS Salé
- 2021–present: Rouen Métropole
Medals
Men's basketball
Representing Morocco
FIBA AfroCan
Gold medal – first place	Angola 2023

Mohamed Choua (born 25 December 1992) is a Moroccan basketball player. He plays for the ASS Sale club of the FIBA Africa Club Champions Cup and the Nationale 1, Morocco's first division.

Since 2021, Choua plays for Rouen Métropole Basket in the French LNB Pro B.

Choua represented Morocco's national basketball team at the 2017 AfroBasket in Tunisia and Senegal. There, he recorded most minutes, rebounds, steals and blocks for Morocco. Choua won the 2023 FIBA AfroCan, hosted in Angola, with Morocco.
