= FIBA Africa Championship 1965 =

FIBA AfroBasket 1965
3rd FIBA Africa Basketball Championship

Tournament details
- Host country: Tunisia
- Dates: 28 March – 2 April
- Teams: 5
- Venue(s): 1 (in 1 host city)

Final positions
- Champions: Morocco (1st title)

The FIBA Africa Championship 1965, was the third FIBA Africa Championship regional basketball championship held by FIBA Africa. It was held in Tunisia between 28 March and 2 April 1965. Five national teams entered the event under the auspices of FIBA Africa, the sport's regional governing body. The city of Tunis hosted the tournament. Morocco won their first title after finishing in first place of the round robin group.

== Results ==
All five teams competed in a round robin group that defined the final standings.

Pos	Team	Pld	W	L	PF	PA	PD	Pts	Classification
1	Morocco	4	4	0	291	185	+106	8	Gold Medal
2	Tunisia (H)	4	2	2	212	217	−5	6	Silver Medal
3	Algeria	4	2	2	210	236	−26	6	Bronze Medal
4	Senegal	4	1	3	180	211	−31	5	
5	Libya	4	1	3	205	249	−44	5	

Source: FIBA Archive
(H) Hosts

Algeria	57–46	Senegal
Scoring by half: 23–23, 34–23

Tunisia	55–58	Libya
Scoring by half: 31–31, 24–27

Tunisia	57–52	Algeria
Scoring by half: 27–19, 30–33

Morocco	59–44	Senegal
Scoring by half: 29–14, 30–30

Libya	45–79	Morocco
Scoring by half: 26–46, 19–33

Tunisia	43–37	Senegal
Scoring by half: 27–14, 16–23

Libya	52–53	Senegal
Scoring by half: 30–23, 22–30

Algeria	39–83	Morocco
Scoring by half: 20–45, 19–38

Tunisia	57–70	Morocco
Scoring by half: 23–30, 34–40

Libya	50–62	Algeria
Scoring by half: 28–24, 22–38
