= FIBA Africa Championship 1964 =

FIBA AfroBasket 1964
2nd FIBA Africa Basketball Championship

Tournament details
- Host country: Morocco
- Dates: 4–8 March
- Teams: 6
- Venue(s): 1 (in 1 host city)

Final positions
- Champions: United Arab Republic (2nd title)

The FIBA Africa Championship 1964 was the second FIBA Africa Championship regional basketball championship held by FIBA Africa, which also served as Africa qualifier for the 1964 Summer Olympics, giving a berth to champion. It was held in Morocco between 4 March and 8 March 1964. Six national teams entered the event under the auspices of FIBA Africa, the sport's regional governing body. The city of Casablanca hosted the tournament. The United Arab Republic won the title after finishing in first place of the round robin group.

== Results ==
All six teams competed in a round robin group that defined the final standings. The United Arab Republic qualified for the 1964 Summer Olympics as winner of the tournament.

Team	Pld	W	L	PF	PA	PD	Pts
United Arab Republic	5	5	0	380	239	+141	10
Morocco	5	4	1	350	269	+81	9
Palestine	5	2	3	236	336	−100	7
Tunisia	5	2	3	300	297	+3	7
Senegal	5	1	4	275	317	−42	6
Mali	5	1	4	287	370	−83	6

Mali	59–95	United Arab Republic
Scoring by half: 27–41, 32–54

Tunisia	51–53	Palestine
Scoring by half: 19–20, 32–33

Morocco	58–54	Senegal
Scoring by half: 26–25, 32–29

Palestine	53–59	Mali
Scoring by half: 24–30, 29–29

Morocco	59–55	Tunisia
Scoring by half: 30–25, 29–30

United Arab Republic	72–37	Senegal
Scoring by half: 33–16, 39–21

Palestine	43–101	Morocco
Scoring by half: 10–44, 33–57

Senegal	77–62	Mali
Scoring by half: 50–31, 27–31

Tunisia	51–69	United Arab Republic
Scoring by half: 24–29, 27–40

United Arab Republic	75–35	Palestine
Scoring by half: 36–20, 39–15

Mali	48–75	Morocco
Scoring by half: 24–26, 24–49

Senegal	57–73	Tunisia
Scoring by half: 22–31, 35–42

Palestine	52–50	Senegal
Scoring by half: 25–27, 27–23

Mali	59–70	Tunisia
Scoring by half: 35–35, 24–35

Morocco	57–69	United Arab Republic
Scoring by half: 30–31, 27–38
