= Obi Emegano =

Nigerian-British basketball player (born 1993)

Casademont Zaragoza
- Position: Shooting guard
- League: Liga ACB

Personal information
- Born: April 29, 1993 (age 33) Lagos, Nigeria
- Listed height: 1.90 m (6 ft 3 in)

Career information
- High school: Edmond Memorial (Edmond, Oklahoma)
- College: Western Illinois (2011–2012); Oral Roberts (2013–2016)
- NBA draft: 2016: undrafted
- Playing career: 2016–present

Career history
- 2016–2017: Junior Casale
- 2017: Kutno
- 2017–2018: Rouen Métropole
- 2018–2019: JDA Dijon
- 2019–2020: Le Mans Sarthe
- 2020–2022: Fuenlabrada
- 2023–present: Casademont Zaragoza

Obinna Clinton “Obi” Emegano (born April 29, 1993) is a Nigerian-British professional basketball player for Casademont Zaragoza of the Liga ACB. He plays shooting guard position.

== Professional career ==
During the 2018–19 season he played for French Pro A side JDA Dijon. He signed with Le Mans Sarthe in July 2019. Emegano averaged 13.1 points, 3.1 rebounds and 1.7 assists per game.

On May 25, 2020, he signed with Fuenlabrada. During the 2020–21 season he averaged 9.9 points per game. Emegano re-signed with the team on July 15, 2021.

On July 29, 2023, he signed with Casademont Zaragoza of the Liga ACB.
