= Souarata Cissé =

French-Malian basketball player

No. 41 – CEP Lorient
- Position: Small forward
- League: Nationale Masculine 1

Personal information
- Born: 16 January 1986 (age 40) Montreuil, Seine-Saint-Denis, France
- Listed height: 6 ft 5 in (1.96 m)

Career information
- Playing career: 2004–present

Career history
- 2004–2006: Élan Béarnais
- 2006–2007: Paris Basket Racing
- 2007–2009: Nanterre
- 2009–2010: Rouen
- 2010: Lille
- 2010–2011: Clermont
- 2011–2012: HTV
- 2013–2015: Hermine Nantes
- 2015–2016: BC Souffelweyersheim
- 2016–2017: Orchies
- 2017–2019: Brissac
- 2019: JL Bourg
- 2019–present: CEP Lorient
Medals
Men's basketball
Representing France
European U-18 Championship
Bronze medal – third place	2004 Spain	U-18 Team

Souarata Cissé (born 16 January 1986) is a French-Malian basketball player who plays for CEP Lorient. He has also played for French Pro A league clubs Pau-Orthez, Paris, Rouen and Hyères-Toulon Var Basket.
