= Mohamed Aboussalam =

Moroccan professional basketball player

No. 9 – Gravenchon
- Position: Center
- League: Nationale Masculine 1

Personal information
- Born: 20 August 1996 (age 30) Mont-Saint-Aignan, France
- Listed height: 2.05 m (6 ft 9 in)

Career information
- Playing career: 2016–present

Career history
- 2016–2018: Rouen
- 2018–2019: MAS Fes
- 2019–2020: Gravenchon
- 2020–2022: Cambrai Basket
- 2022–present: Gravenchon

Mohamed Aboussalam (born 20 August 1996) is a French-Moroccan basketball player who plays for Gravenchon and Morocco.

== Professional career ==
Aboussalam played for the youth teams of Rouen, before joining the LNB Pro B team in 2016. In 2018, he signed his first professional contract when he signed with MAS Fes of the Division Excellence.

== National team career ==
Aboussalam represented Morocco's national basketball team at the 2017 AfroBasket in Tunisia and Senegal.
