= Jacques Conceição =

Angolan-Portuguese basketball player (born 1989)

No. 15 – Galitos F.C.
- Position: Point guard
- League: LPB

Personal information
- Born: September 4, 1989 (age 37) Lisbon, Portugal
- Listed height: 6 ft 3 in (1.91 m)
- Listed weight: 190 lb (86 kg)

Career information
- High school: Lycée français Charles Lepierre
- College: William Paterson
- NBA draft: 2015: undrafted
- Playing career: 2015–present

Career history
- 2015–2017: Galitos F.C.
- 2017–2018: Primeiro de Agosto
- 2018–2019: S.L. Benfica
- 2019–2020: ADO Basquetebol Sad Ovarense
- 2020–2021: Galitos F.C.
- 2021–2022: Lusitânia
- 2022–2023: Imortal
- 2023–present: Galitos F.C.

Jacques Leandro Pinto Nzadi Conceição (born 4 September 1989) is an Angolan-Portuguese basketball player. for Galitos F.C. of the LPB.

== College career ==
Before attending college, he played basketball at the Atlético Clube de Portugal where he won the South conference and was third at the Final Four as a senior. He moved to William Paterson University in 2011, he averaged 7.79 points, 5.68 rebounds and 1.61 assists in his freshman year. In his sophomore year, he averaged 7.79 points, 5.68 rebounds and 1.61 assists. In his junior year, he averaged 10.42 points, 7.89 rebounds and 1.22 assists. In his Senior year, he averaged 8.10 points, 5.07 rebounds and 1.59 assists.

== Professional career ==
Conceição played for the Galitos F.C. in the 2015–16 season, he averaged 6.66 points, 3.38 rebounds and 1.56 assists. In the 2016–17 season, he averaged 10.92 points, 3.62 rebounds and 2.30 assists. In the 2017–18 season, he moved to the Angolan side Primeiro de Agosto He moved Back to Portugal in the 2018–19 season to play for the S.L. Benfica where he averaged 2.48 points, 1 rebound and 0.65 assists. He moved to the ADO Basquetebol Sad Ovarense in the 2019–20 season.

== National Team Career ==
Conceição represented the Angola national basketball team at the AfroBasket 2017 where he averaged 4.8 points, 2.5 rebounds and 1.3 assists per game. Conceição also represented the Angola national basketball team at the 2019 FIBA Basketball World Cup in China, where he averaged 3 points, 1 rebound and 1.5 assists per game.

== Personal life ==
Jacques Conceição is the son of the retired Angolan-Portuguese basketball player Jean-Jacques Conceição.
