= Gambia men's national basketball team =

Gambian basketball team

The Gambia
- FIBA ranking: NR (1 September 2026)
- Joined FIBA: 1972
- FIBA zone: FIBA Africa
- National federation: Gambia Basketball Association (GBA)

Olympic Games
- Appearances: None

FIBA World Cup
- Appearances: None

African Championship
- Appearances: 1 (1978)
- Medals: None
Home	Away

The Gambia national basketball team represents The Gambia in international competitions. It is administered by the Gambia Basketball Association (GBA).

The team's best international performance to date was 9th place at the 1978 African Basketball Championship.

Several Gambian basketball players play for professional teams throughout Europe. Yet, the last time the country's national team attempted to qualify for the official African Basketball Championship dates back to 2005.

The best-known basketball player with Gambian roots is NBA player Dennis Schröder, whose mother grew up in Gambia.

== Competitive record ==
=== Summer Olympics ===
yet to qualify

=== World championship ===
yet to qualify

=== FIBA Africa Championship ===
Year	Position	Tournament	Host
1978	9	FIBA Africa Championship 1978	Dakar, Senegal
2020	To Be Determined	FIBA Africa Championship 2020	To Be Determined

=== African Games ===
yet to qualify

== Current roster ==
Team for the FIBA Africa Championship 2005 qualification: (last publicized squad)

Gambia roster
Players
Coaches

Pos.	No.	Name	Age – Date of birth	Height	Club
		Hassan Musa Jaissey	26 – 28 October 1978
		Alajie Jaiteh	17 – 16 August 1987
		Badara Joof	16 – 14 December 1988
		Dawda Njie	17 – 17 February 1988
		Omar Njie	17 – 18 March 1988
		Alieu Sarr	30 – 15 March 1975
		Muhammed Musa Sarr	24 – 30 September 1980
		Momodou Lamin Sowe	20 – 10 February 1985
		Njogu Taal	19 – 19 March 1986
		Muhammadou Trawally	25 – 7 January 1980
		Bunja Yabou	19 – 19 June 1986

Head coach

- ?

Assistant coach(es)

- ?

Legend

- (C) Team captain
- Club field describes current pro club
- Age – describes age on 15 Aug 2005

== Notable players ==
Notable players from the Gambia:

Gambia roster
Players	Coaches
Pos. / No. / Name / Age – Date of birth / Height / Club; F/C / / Mawdo Sallah / 25 – 13 January 1994 / 2.03 m (6 ft 8 in) / Radford Highlanders men's basketball / (United States)	Legend: Club – describes current club; Age – describes age on 1 January 2020
