= FIBA Africa Championship 1995 =

Tournament details
- Host country: Algeria
- City: Algiers
- Dates: 11–18 December
- Teams: 9
- Venue: 1 (in 1 host city)

Final positions
- Champions: Angola (4th title)
- Runners-up: Senegal
- Third place: Nigeria
- Fourth place: Algeria

The FIBA Africa Championship 1995 took place in Algiers, Algeria from December 11 to December 18, 1995. The top country in this FIBA Africa Championship earned the berth allocated to Africa for the 1996 Summer Olympics in Atlanta. Angola won the tournament, the country's 4th consecutive African championship, by beating Senegal in the final.

== Competing nations ==
The following national teams competed:

Group A	Group B
Algeria; Ivory Coast; Zaire; Morocco; Nigeria	Angola; Mali; Mozambique; Senegal

== Preliminary rounds ==
=== Group A ===
Team	Pts	Pld	W	L	PF	PA	Diff
Algeria	7	4	3	1	289	244	+55
Nigeria	7	4	3	1	241	218	+23
Morocco	6	4	2	2	265	273	-8
Ivory Coast	6	4	2	2	302	289	+13
Zaire	4	4	0	4	172	327	-155

Day 1

Algeria	65–57	Morocco
Ivory Coast	57–61	Nigeria

Day 2

Zaire	59–87	Algeria
Ivory Coast	77–85	Morocco

Day 3

Morocco	52–63	Nigeria
Ivory Coast	87–63	Zaire

Day 4

Nigeria	70–52	Zaire
Algeria	80–81	Ivory Coast

Day 5

Algeria	57–47	Nigeria
Morocco	71–68	Zaire

=== Group B ===
Team	Pts	Pld	W	L	PF	PA	Diff
Angola	6	3	3	0	280	142	+138
Senegal	5	3	2	1	227	214	+13
Mali	4	3	1	2	196	245	-49
Mozambique	3	3	0	3	164	266	-102

Day 1

Senegal	80–65	Mozambique
Angola	73–51	Senegal

Day 2

Mali	69–59	Mozambique
Angola	90–51	Mali

Day 3

Angola	117–40	Mozambique
Senegal	96–76	Mali

== Knockout stage ==
Semi-finals
December 17, 1995
Angola	74
Nigeria	56
December 17, 1995
Senegal	61
Algeria	45

Final
December 18, 1995
Angola	67
Senegal	55
Third place
December 18, 1995
Nigeria	58
Algeria	51

== Classification Stage ==
Mali	77–71	Morocco
Ivory Coast	90–49	Mozambique

== Final standings ==
Rank	Team	Record
1	Angola	5-0
2	Senegal	3-2
3	Nigeria	4-2
4	Algeria	3-3
5	Mali	2-2
6	Morocco	2-3
7	Ivory Coast	3-2
8	Mozambique	0-4
9	Zaire	0-4

Angola qualified for the 1996 Summer Olympics in Atlanta.

== Awards ==
1995 FIBA Africa Championship winners

Angola
Fourth title

Most Valuable Player
