= Vafessa Fofana =

Franco-Ivorian basketball player (born 1992)

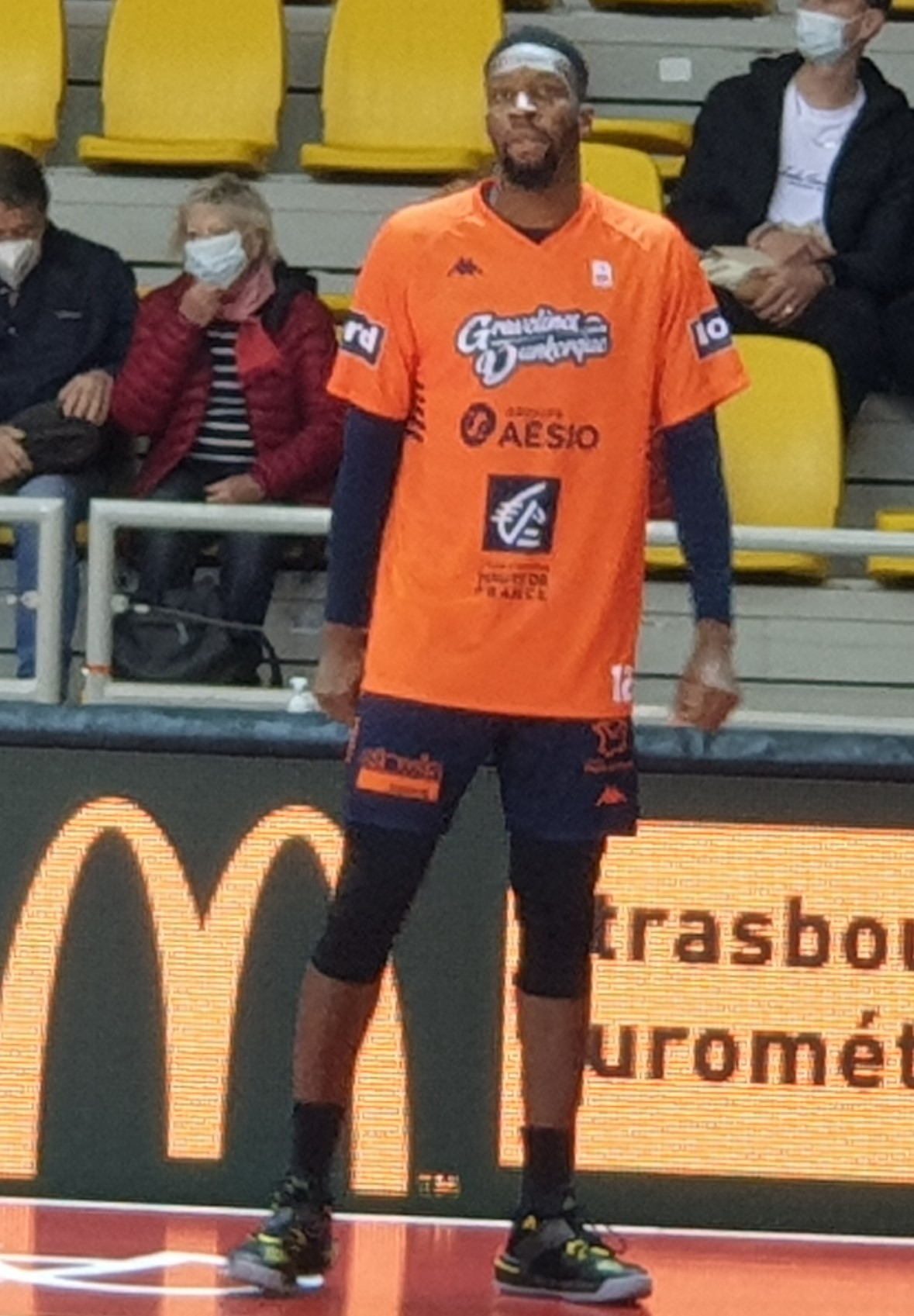

No. 6 – BCM Gravelines-Dunkerque
- Position: Small forward
- League: LNB Élite

Personal information
- Born: 12 June 1992 (age 34) Paris, France
- Listed height: 2.01 m (6 ft 7 in)
- Listed weight: 202 lb (92 kg)

Career information
- NBA draft: 2014: undrafted

Career history
- 2012–2013: Saint-Vallier
- 2013–2016: Denain Voltaire
- 2016–2017: Hermine Nantes
- 2017–2018: HTV
- 2018–2019: Hermine Nantes
- 2019–2021: Cholet
- 2021–present: BCM Gravelines-Dunkerque

Vafessa Fofana (born 12 June 1992) is a French-Ivorian professional basketball player for BCM Gravelines-Dunkerque of the LNB Élite. He also represents the Ivory Coast national basketball team.

== Professional career ==
In 2009, Fofana started his club career with the Cholet Basket under 21 at the age of 17, he averaged 4.3 points, 2.8 rebounds and 0.3 blocks. In his second season at Cholet Basketball Under 21, he averaged 9.3 points, 3.5 rebounds and 0.6 blocks. In his third season at the Cholet Basketball Under 21, he averaged 13.4 points, 4 rebounds and 0.6 blocks.

In 2012, he played for the Saint-Vallier basketball team where he averaged 1.8 points, 1.6 rebounds and 0.3 blocks. In 2013, he played for the Denain Voltaire Basket where he averaged 4.1 points, 2.7 rebounds and 0.1 blocks.

In 2016, He played for the Hermine Nantes Basket where he averaged 8 points, 4.5 rebounds and 0 blocks. In 2017, he moved to HTV Basket where he averaged 6.3 points, 3.5 rebounds and 0.3 In 2018, he moved back to Hermine Nantes Basket where he averaged 9.9 points, 5.1 rebounds and 0.4 blocks. In 2019, He moved back to Cholet Basket.

On June 23, 2021, he has signed with BCM Gravelines-Dunkerque of LNB Pro A.

== Ivorian National team ==
Fafona represents the Ivory Coast national basketball team. He participated at 2019 FIBA Basketball World Cup where he averaged 3.2 points, 2.6 rebounds and 2.4 assist. He also played with his country at FIBA AfroBasket 2021, helping the team win the silver medal. He averaged 12 points and 10.7 rounds per game over the tournament.
