= Bryan Pamba =

French-Ivorian basketball player

Union Rennes Basket 35
- Position: Point guard
- League: Nationale Masculine 1

Personal information
- Born: 7 January 1992 (age 34) Paris, France
- Listed height: 186 cm (6 ft 1 in)
- Listed weight: 94 kg (207 lb)

Career information
- Playing career: 2010–present

Career history
- 2010–2013: Orléans Loiret
- 2013–2014: ALM Évreux
- 2014–2017: Lille
- 2017–2018: Hermine Nantes
- 2018–2019: Chorale Roanne
- 2018–2019: Caen
- 2019–2020: Poitiers
- 2020–present: Rennes

Bryan Allan Pamba (born 7 January 1992) is a French-Ivorian basketball player who plays for Rennes and Ivory Coast. With the Ivorian national team, he played at the 2019 FIBA Basketball World Cup.
