= Destin Damachoua =

Central Africanbasketball player

Personal information
- Born: 17 August 1986 (age 40) Paris, France
- Listed height: 1.85 m (6 ft 1 in)
- Listed weight: 84 kg (185 lb)

Career information
- College: Polk State (2006–2008); New Orleans (2008–2010)
- NBA draft: 2010: undrafted
- Position: Guard

Career history
- 2014–2015: Bordeaux
- 2015–2017: CEP Lorient
- 2017–2019: Pont de Cheruy
- 2022–present: Grenoble Basket 38

Destin Damachoua (born 17 August 1986) is a basketball player who played as a guard for the University of New Orleans. He is also a member of the Central African Republic national basketball team.

Damachoua moved to the United States after his senior year of high school in France. He originally committed to Duquesne University out of the Master's School in West Simsbury, Connecticut in 2006, but never played for the team. Instead, Damachoua played JUCO basketball for Polk Community College in Florida where he was a two-time All-Sun Coast Conference performer. In his first season with the Privateers, Damachoua played primarily off the bench, averaging 2.3 PPG.

Damachoua played for the Central African Republic national basketball team at the 2005 and 2009 FIBA Africa Championship, helping the team to quarterfinal appearances at both tournaments.
