= Morocco men's national basketball team =

Moroccan basketball team

Morocco
- Joined FIBA: 1936
- FIBA zone: FIBA Africa
- National federation: Moroccan Royal Basketball Federation
- Coach: Gustavo Aranza Mendez
- Nickname: Atlas Lions

Olympic Games
- Appearances: 1
- Medals: None

FIBA World Cup
- Appearances: 0

AfroBasket
- Appearances: 20
- Medals: Gold: (1965); Silver: (1964, 1968); Bronze: (1962, 1980)

AfroCan
- Appearances: 2
- Medals: Gold: (2023)
Home	Away

The Morocco national basketball team represents Morocco in international basketball competitions. The team is governed by the Moroccan Royal Basketball Federation, also known as the FRMBB. The team has appeared at the FIBA AfroBasket 20 times and has won the gold medal in the 1965 tournament. In 1968, Morocco finished as runners-up.

The team made the Olympics once, in 1968, but went 0-9 in those games, holding the ignominious distinction of playing the most Olympic basketball games without winning any.

== History ==
On the first edition of AfroCan, Morocco was placed 4th after losing the bronze medal to Angola.

On 16 July 2023, Morocco won the 2023 FIBA AfroCan Final after beating Cote d'Ivoire 78-76 that took place in Luanda, Angola. King Mohammed VI congratulated the team for their achievement on claiming the second continental title for the national team.

== Tournament record ==
=== Olympic Games ===
Year	Round	Position	GP	W	L
(Nazi Germany) 1936	Not an IOC Member				
(United Kingdom) 1948	Not an IOC Member				
(Finland) 1952	Not an IOC Member				
(Australia) 1956	Did not qualify				
(Italy) 1960	Did not qualify				
(Japan) 1964	Did not qualify				
(Mexico) 1968	16th place	16th	9	0	9
(West Germany) 1972	Did not qualify				
(Canada) 1976	Did not qualify				
(Soviet Union) 1980	Did not qualify				
(United States) 1984	Did not qualify				
(South Korea) 1984	Did not qualify				
(Spain) 1992	Did not qualify				
(United States) 1996	Did not qualify				
(Australia) 2000	Did not qualify				
(Greece) 2004	Did not qualify				
(China) 2008	Did not qualify				
(United Kingdom) 2012	Did not qualify				
(Brazil) 2016	Did not qualify				
(Japan) 2020	Did not qualify				
(France) 2024	Did not qualify				
(United States) 2028	To be determined				
(Australia) 2032	To be determined				
Total	1/23		9	0	9

=== FIBA Basketball World Cup ===
Year	Round	Position	GP	W	L
(Argentina) 1950	Did not qualify				
(Brazil) 1954	Did not qualify				
(Chile) 1959	Did not qualify				
(Brazil) 1963	Did not qualify				
(Uruguay) 1967	Did not qualify				
(Socialist Federal Republic of Yugoslavia) 1970	Did not qualify				
(Puerto Rico) 1974	Did not qualify				
(Philippines) 1978	Did not qualify				
(Colombia) 1982	Did not qualify				
(Spain) 1986	Did not qualify				
(Argentina) 1990	Did not qualify				
(Canada) 1994	Did not qualify				
(Greece) 1998	Did not qualify				
(United States) 2002	Did not qualify				
(Japan) 2006	Did not qualify				
(Turkey) 2010	Did not qualify				
(Spain) 2014	Did not qualify				
(China) 2019	Did not qualify				
(Philippines) / (Japan) / (Indonesia) 2023	Did not qualify				
(Qatar) 2027	Did not qualify				
(France) 2031	To be determined				
Total	0/21		9	0	9

=== FIBA AfroBasket ===
Champions Runners-up Third place Fourth place

Year	Round	Position	GP	W	L
(Egypt) 1962	Third place	3rd	4	2	2
(Morocco) 1964	Runners-up	2nd	5	4	1
(Tunisia) 1965	Champions	1st	4	4	0
(Morocco) 1968	Runners-up	2nd	6	5	1
(Egypt) 1970	Did not qualify				
(Senegal) 1972	7th place	7th	6	3	3
(Central African Republic) 1974	Did not qualify				
(Egypt) 1975	Did not qualify				
(Egypt) 1978	5th place	5th	5	3	2
(Morocco) 1980	Third place	3rd	6	4	2
(Somalia) 1981	Did not qualify				
(Egypt) 1983	Did not qualify				
(Ivory Coast) 1985	Did not qualify				
(Tunisia) 1987	Did not qualify				
(Egypt) 1989	5th place	9th	6	2	4
(Egypt) 1992	5th place	9th	5	1	4
(Kenya) 1993	Did not qualify				
(Algeria) 1995	6th place	6th	5	2	3
(Senegal) 1997	Did not qualify				
(Angola) 1999	11th place	11th	6	1	5
(Morocco) 2001	6th place	6th	6	4	2
(Egypt) 2003	8th place	8th	6	2	4
(Algeria) 2005	6th place	6th	8	3	5
(Angola) 2007	10th place	10th	6	3	3
(Libya) 2009	10th place	12th	8	3	5
(Angola) 2011	8th place	8th	7	2	5
(Ivory Coast) 2013	8th place	8th	7	3	4
(Tunisia) 2015	13th place	13th	5	1	4
(Senegal) / (Tunisia) 2017	4th place	4th	6	4	2
(Rwanda) 2021	Did not qualify				
(Angola) 2025	Did not qualify				
Total	20/31		117	56	61

=== FIBA AfroCan ===
Champions Fourth place

Year	Round	Position	GP	W	L
(Mali) 2019	4th place	4th	6	3	3
(Angola) 2023	Champions	1st	6	5	1
(Rwanda) 2027	Qualified				
Total	3/3		12	8	4

=== Mediterranean Games ===
- 2005 Almería: 8th

== Team ==
=== Current roster ===
Morocco men's national basketball team roster
Players
Coaches

Pos.	No.	Name	Age – Date of birth	Height	Club	Ctr.
SF	3	Ayoub Nouhi	25 – 7 January 1999	1.95 m (6 ft 5 in)	FUS Rabat	(Morocco)
PG	5	Yassine El Mahsini	30 – 26 October 1993	1.86 m (6 ft 1 in)	AS Salé	(Morocco)
G	8	Soufiane Benhmine	31 – 8 April 1992	1.92 m (6 ft 4 in)	FUS Rabat	(Morocco)
	9	Mohamed Bnichou	25 – 13 March 1998
G	10	Kevin Franceschi	30 – 5 October 1993		AS FAR	(Morocco)
PF	11	Abdelhakim Zouita	37 – 12 August 1986	2.00 m (6 ft 7 in)	FUS Rabat	(Morocco)
F	12	Ilias Aqboub	22 – 25 January 2002	2.04 m (6 ft 8 in)	AS Salé	(Morocco)
SF	15	Karim Gourari	34 – 26 May 1989	2.02 m (6 ft 8 in)	Rouen Métropole Basket	(France)
C	23	Khalid Boukichou	31 – 17 September 1992	2.08 m (6 ft 10 in)	AS Salé	(Morocco)
PF	32	Badreddine Azouga	29 – 7 February 1995	2.04 m (6 ft 8 in)	FUS Rabat	(Morocco)
PF	33	Mohamed Choua	31 – 25 December 1992	2.00 m (6 ft 7 in)	Rouen Métropole Basket	(France)
SG	55	Jihad Benchlikha	33 – 6 January 1991	1.86 m (6 ft 1 in)	AS FAR	(Morocco)

Head coach

- (Spain) Gustavo Aranzana

Assistant coach(es)

- (Morocco) Mohamed Nizar Mesbahi

=== Head coach position ===
- (Spain) Moncho Monsalve – 2001
- Jean-Paul Rabatet
- (United States) Sterling Wright – 2003
- Hassan Hachad – 2011–2013
- Said El Bouzidi – 2017
- Labib El Hamrani – 2023–2024
- (Spain) Gustavo Aranza Mendez – 2024

=== Past rosters ===
Team for the 2013 FIBA Africa Championship.

Morocco men's national basketball team roster
Players
Coaches

Pos.	No.	Name	Age – Date of birth	Height	Club
F	4	Reda Ali Harras	19 – 24 November 1993	1.98 m (6 ft 6 in)
C	5	Reda Rhalimi	31 – 2 February 1982	2.05 m (6 ft 9 in)	AS Salé
F	6	Abderrahim Najah	28 – 20 November 1984	2.00 m (6 ft 7 in)	AS Salé
F	7	Zakaria El Masbahi	34 – 29 March 1979	1.93 m (6 ft 4 in)	AS Salé
G	8	Mustapha Khalfi	33 – 1 January 1980	1.81 m (5 ft 11 in)	Chabab Rif Al Hoceima
C	9	Mohamed Hjira	32 – 19 January 1981	2.02 m (6 ft 8 in)	Chabab Rif Al Hoceima
F/C	10	Youssef Zangui	32 – 12 July 1981	2.02 m (6 ft 8 in)
F	11	Abdelhakim Zouita	27 – 12 August 1986	2.00 m (6 ft 7 in)	AS Salé
G	12	Soufiane Nadim	25 – 2 March 1988		FUS de Rabat
C	13	Soufiane Kourodu	28 – 21 May 1985	2.06 m (6 ft 9 in)	AS Salé
	14	Abdelali Lahrichi	20 – 19 July 1993
F/C	15	Younes Idrissi	29 – 13 April 1984	2.03 m (6 ft 8 in)	AS Salé

Head coach

- Hassan Hachad

Legend

- Club – describes last
  club before the tournament
- Age – describes age
  on 20 August 2013

At the AfroBasket 2015:

Morocco men's national basketball team roster
Players
Coaches

Pos.	No.	Name	Age – Date of birth	Height	Club	Ctr.
	4	Reda Ali Harras	21 – 24 November 1993	1.98 m (6 ft 6 in)
	6	Soufiane Kourodu	30 – 21 May 1985	2.09 m (6 ft 10 in)		(Morocco)
	7	Zakaria El Masbahi	36 – 29 March 1979	1.92 m (6 ft 4 in)	AS Salé	(Morocco)
	7	Abdelali Lahrichi	22 – 19 July 1993	1.90 m (6 ft 3 in)
	8	Mustapha Khalifi	35 – 1 January 1980	1.77 m (5 ft 10 in)		(Morocco)
	9	Omar Laanani	28 – 26 March 1987	2.08 m (6 ft 10 in)		(Morocco)
	10	Mohamed Choua	22 – 25 December 1992	2.00 m (6 ft 7 in)
	11	Abdelhakim Zouita	29 – 12 August 1986	1.99 m (6 ft 6 in)		(Morocco)
	13	Adil El Makssoud	30 – 12 December 1984	1.95 m (6 ft 5 in)		(Morocco)
	14	Kamal Hachad	32 – 22 July 1983	1.96 m (6 ft 5 in)
	15	Abderrahim Najah	30 – 20 November 1984	1.98 m (6 ft 6 in)		(Morocco)
		Mohamed Aboussalam	18 – 20 August 1996

Head coach

- Jad Fattouh

Assistant coach(es)

- Anton Vujanic
- Abdelaziz Quarouach

Legend

- Club – describes last
  club before the tournament
- Age – describes age
  on 19 August 2015

At the AfroBasket 2017:

Morocco men's national basketball team roster
Players
Coaches

Pos.	No.	Name	Age – Date of birth	Height	Club	Ctr.
F/C	4	Abderrahim Najah	32 – 20 November 1984	1.98 m (6 ft 6 in)	AS Salé	(Morocco)
PG	5	Mustapha Khalfi	37 – 1 January 1980	1.77 m (5 ft 10 in)	AS Salé	(Morocco)
C	6	Soufiane Kourdou	32 – 21 May 1985	2.11 m (6 ft 11 in)	AS Salé	(Morocco)
G/F	7	Zakaria El Masbahi	38 – 29 March 1979	1.92 m (6 ft 4 in)	AS Salé	(Morocco)
SG	8	Abdelali Lahraichi	24 – 19 July 1993	1.90 m (6 ft 3 in)	Wydad AC	(Morocco)
C	9	Mohamed Aboussalam	21 – 20 August 1996	2.04 m (6 ft 8 in)	Rouen Métropole Basket	(France)
F/C	10	Mohamed Choua	24 – 25 December 1992	2.02 m (6 ft 8 in)	AS Salé	(Morocco)
PG	11	Jihad Benchlikha	25 – 6 January 1992	1.86 m (6 ft 1 in)	ASFAR	(Morocco)
F/C	12	John Wilkins	28 – 13 July 1989	2.07 m (6 ft 9 in)	Chabab Rif Al Hoceima	(Morocco)
G/F	13	Adil El Makssoud	31 – 12 December 1985	1.93 m (6 ft 4 in)	Chabab Rif Al Hoceima	(Morocco)
PG	14	Nadim Soufiane	29 – 2 May 1988	1.85 m (6 ft 1 in)
C	15	Reda Rhalimi	35 – 2 February 1982	2.12 m (6 ft 11 in)	Chabab Rif Al Hoceima	(Morocco)

Head coach

- (Morocco) Said El Bouzidi

Assistant coach(es)

- (Morocco) Hamrani Labib

Legend

- Club – describes last
  club before the tournament
- Age – describes age
  on 8 September 2017

== Head coaches ==
- (Morocco) Naoufal Uariachi
- (Morocco) Said El Bouzidi
- (Morocco) Labib El Hamrani (June 2021–present)

== Honours ==
AfroBasket

- Champions (1): 1965

Runner-up: 1964, 1968
Third place: 1962, 1980

AfroCan

- Champions (1): 2023

Pan Arab Games

(bronze) Third place: 1961

Arab Basketball Championship

(silver) Runner-up: 2005, 2017
(bronze) Third place: 2000, 2009, 2010

== See also ==
- Morocco men's national under-18 basketball team
