= FIBA Africa Championship 1978 =

1978 FIBA AfroBasket
9th FIBA African Basketball Championship

Tournament details
- Host country: Senegal
- Dates: December 24-January 1
- Teams: 10 (from 35 federations)
- Venue: 1 (in 1 host city)

Final positions
- Champions: Senegal (3rd title)

The FIBA Africa Championship 1978 was hosted by Senegal from December 24, 1977 to January 1, 1978. The games were played in Dakar. Senegal won the tournament, its third African Championship, to qualify for the 1978 FIBA World Championship.

== Competing nations ==
The following national teams competed:

Group A	Group B
Ivory Coast; Gambia; Mauritania; Nigeria; Senegal	Egypt; Libya; Morocco; Sudan; Togo

== Preliminary rounds ==
=== Group A ===
Team	Pts	Pld	W	L	PF	PA	Diff
Senegal	8	4	4	0	398	251	+147
Ivory Coast	7	4	3	1	378	323	+55
Nigeria	6	4	2	2	346	334	+12
Mauritania	5	4	1	3	282	342	-60
Gambia	4	4	0	4	281	435	-155

Day 1

Senegal	112–55	Mauritania
Nigeria	124–69	Gambia

Day 2

Gambia	77–129	Ivory Coast
Nigeria	56–104	Senegal

Day 3

Mauritania	69–78	Nigeria
Senegal	87–73	Ivory Coast

Day 4

Senegal	95–67	Gambia
Mauritania	71–84	Ivory Coast

Day 5

Ivory Coast	92–88	Nigeria
Mauritania	87–68	Gambia

=== Group B ===
Team	Pts	Pld	W	L	PF	PA	Diff
Egypt	8	4	4	0	216	152	+64
Sudan	7	4	3	1	314	225	+89
Morocco	6	4	2	2	407	372	+35
Togo	5	4	1	3	290	349	-59
Libya	4	4	0	4	209	338	-129

Day 1

Sudan	99–71	Togo
Egypt	107–89	Morocco

Day 2

Togo	83–49	Libya
Sudan	97–87	Morocco

Day 3

Morocco	135–95	Libya
Egypt	2–0	Sudan

Day 4

Morocco	96–73	Togo
Egypt	2–0	Libya

Day 5

Egypt	105–63	Togo
Sudan	118–65	Libya

== Knockout stage ==
Semi-finals
December 31, 1977
Ivory Coast	102
Egypt	93
December 31, 1977
Senegal	2
Sudan	0

Final
January 1, 1978
Ivory Coast	72 (36)
Senegal	103 (52)
Third place
January 1, 1978
Egypt	2
Sudan	0

== Classification Stage ==
Morocco	98–94	Nigeria
Mauritania	76–71	Togo
Libya	90–121	Gambia

== Final standings ==
Rank	Team	Record
1	Senegal	6-0
2	Ivory Coast	4-2
3	Egypt	5-1
4	Sudan	3-3
5	Morocco	3-2
6	Nigeria	2-3
7	Mauritania	2-3
8	Togo	1-4
9	Gambia	1-4
10	Libya	0-5

Senegal qualified for the 1978 FIBA World Championship.
