= Abdelali Lahrichi =

Moroccan basketball player

Abdelali Lahraichi
No. 28 – AS Salé
- Position: Shooting guard / point guard
- League: Division Excellence

Personal information
- Born: 19 July 1993 (age 33) Casablanca, Morocco
- Listed height: 6 ft 3 in (1.91 m)
- Listed weight: 191.8 lb (87 kg)

Career information
- NBA draft: 2015: undrafted
- Playing career: 2015–present

Career history
- 2015–2020: Wydad AC
- 2020-2021: Cergy-Pontoise
- 2021–present: KACM
- 2022–present: AS Salé

Abdelali Lahrichi (born 19 July 1993) is a Moroccan professional basketball player who plays for AS Salé of the Division Excellence.

== Career ==
=== Club career ===
After starting his career with Wydad AC, and he joined AMI (Association Michlifen Ifrane) he joined Cergy-Pontoise in 2020. After one season with Kawkab Atletic Club de Marrakech, he joined AS Salé for the 2022 BAL Playoffs.

=== National career ===
He represented Morocco's national basketball team at the 2017 AfroBasket in Tunisia and Senegal, where he recorded most steals for Morocco.
