= Adil El Makssoud =

Moroccan basketball player

CRA Hoceima
- Position: Shooting guard / small forward
- League: Nationale 1

Personal information
- Born: December 12, 1985 (age 40)
- Listed height: 6 ft 4 in (1.93 m)

Career information
- Playing career: 2012–present

Career history
- 2015–present: CRA Hoceima

Adil El Makssoud (born December 12, 1985) is a Moroccan professional basketball player. He currently plays for the CRA Hoceima club of the Nationale 1, Morocco's first division.

He represented Morocco's national basketball team at the 2017 AfroBasket in Tunisia and Senegal, where he recorded most steals for Morocco.
