= Rouen Métropole Basket =

- Nickname: RMB
- Leagues: LNB Pro B
- Founded: 1945
- Arena: Kindarena
- Capacity: 5,789
- Location: Rouen, France
- Team colors: Blue, White, Black, Orange
- President: Yvan Gueuder
- Website: rouenmetrobasket.com
Home	Away

Rouen Métropole Basket, shortly named RMB, are a professional basketball club founded in 2011, based in Rouen, France. The team currently plays in the LNB Pro B, the French second division.

== History ==
After playing in the Pro B for one year, the club received a wild card for the 2014–15 Pro A season. The team was relegated back to Pro B after the 2015–16 Pro A season.

== Season by season ==
Season	Tier	League	Pos.	French Cup	European competitions
2013–14	2	Pro B	13th (Note: Due to the expansion of the Pro A from 16 to 18 teams, Rouen was offered a wild card.)		
2014–15	1	Pro A	15th		
2015–16	1	Pro A	17th		
2016–17	2	Pro B	11th		
2017–18	2	Pro B			

== Notable players ==
To appear in this section a player must have either:

- Set a club record or won an individual award as a professional player.
- Played at least one official international match for his senior national team.

- (France) Abdoulaye M'Baye
- (France) Maxime Courby
- (France) Alain Koffi
- (France) Guerschon Yabusele
- (Republic of the Congo) Jean-Michel Mipoka

- (Morocco) Mohamed Aboussalam
- (Nigeria) Akinlolu Akingbala
- (Nigeria) Chima Moneke
- (United States) Daequan Cook
- (United States) Devin Searcy

- (United States) Amin Stevens
