= AfroBasket 2015 squads =

This article displays the rosters for the participating teams at the AfroBasket 2015. The player ages are as of August 30, 2015, which will be the final day of the tournament.

== Group A ==
=== Tunisia ===
Tunisia's final roster as announced in the official website.

Tunisia men's national basketball team roster
Players
Coaches

Pos.	No.	Name	Age – Date of birth	Height	Club	Ctr.
G	4	Omar Abada	22 – 20 April 1993	1.89 m (6 ft 2 in)	Étoile Sportive de Radès	(Tunisia)
C	5	Mohamed Abbassi	29 – 22 April 1986	2.02 m (6 ft 8 in)	Étoile Sportive de Radès	(Tunisia)
G	6	Nizar Knioua	32 – 8 June 1983	1.89 m (6 ft 2 in)	Stade Nabeulien	(Tunisia)
G	7	Mourad El Mabrouk	28 – 19 October 1986	1.85 m (6 ft 1 in)	Club Africain	(Tunisia)
PG	8	Mehdi Sayeh	24 – 4 September 1990	1.97 m (6 ft 6 in)	Club athlétique bizertin	(Tunisia)
F	9	Mohamed Hdidane	29 – 27 April 1986	2.06 m (6 ft 9 in)	Stade Nabeulien	(Tunisia)
SG	10	Michael Roll	27 – 12 October 1987	1.98 m (6 ft 6 in)	Tüyap Büyükçekmece B.K.	(Turkey)
C	11	Mokhtar Ghyaza	28 – 15 November 1986	2.04 m (6 ft 8 in)	Étoile Sportive de Radès	(Tunisia)
F	12	Makrem Ben Romdhane	26 – 27 March 1989	2.06 m (6 ft 9 in)	Alexandria Sporting Club	(Egypt)
F	13	Amine Rzig	34 – 25 August 1980	1.98 m (6 ft 6 in)	Al Ittihad	(Egypt)
PF	14	Hamdi Braa	28 – 7 September 1986	2.03 m (6 ft 8 in)	Alexandria Sporting Club	(Egypt)
C	15	Salah Mejri	29 – 15 June 1986	2.17 m (7 ft 1 in)	Dallas Mavericks	(United States)

Head coach

- (Tunisia) Adel Tlatli

Legend

- Club – describes last
  club before the tournament
- Age – describes age
  on 20 August 2015

=== Central African Republic ===
Central African Republic announced its 20-man preliminary squad on June 26, 2015, through head coach Aubin-Thierry Goporo. However, William Kossangue, James Mays, and Maxime Zianveni later dropped out. Goporo said he would not pursue "players who do not want to play for their country." On July 30, 2015, Michael Mokongo was ruled out of the tournament due to a knee injury.

The final squad of the Central African Republic team for the AfroBasket 2015:

Central African Republic men's national basketball team roster
Players
Coaches

Pos.	No.	Name	Age – Date of birth	Height	Club	Ctr.
G	4	Destin Damachoua	29 – 17 August 1986	1.85 m (6 ft 1 in)	CEP Lorient	(France)
G	5	Junior Madozein	27 – 10 October 1987	1.88 m (6 ft 2 in)	ASOPI	(Central African Republic)
F	6	Lionel Pehoua	31 – 8 November 1983	1.96 m (6 ft 5 in)		(France)
F	7	Glenn Feidanga	21 – 15 February 1994	2.03 m (6 ft 8 in)	LIU Brooklyn	(United States)
F	8	Johan Grebongo	21 – 18 January 1994	2.06 m (6 ft 9 in)	BCM Gravelines	(France)
C	9	Dimitri Kongbo	28 – 8 August 1987	2.06 m (6 ft 9 in)	Annecy Basketball	(France)
F	10	Sydney Pehoua	27 – 3 May 1988	1.98 m (6 ft 6 in)	Besançon BCD	(France)
F	11	Yannick Zachée	28 – 29 October 1986	1.92 m (6 ft 4 in)	Tarbes Lourdes	(France)
	12	Séverin Febou	27 – 20 December 1987	1.92 m (6 ft 4 in)	Red Star NDongo Club	(Central African Republic)
F	13	Max Kouguere	28 – 12 March 1987	1.98 m (6 ft 6 in)	Pau-Orthez	(France)
F	14	Philippe Djada	21 – 31 March 1994	1.99 m (6 ft 6 in)	Barjouville Basketball	(France)
F	15	Jimmy Djimrabaye	23 – 8 April 1992	2.03 m (6 ft 8 in)	ESSM Le Portel	(France)

Head coach

- (Central African Republic) Aubin-Thierry Goporo

Legend

- Club – describes last
  club before the tournament
- Age – describes age
  on 30 August 2015

=== Nigeria ===
On July 2, 2015, the Nigeria Basketball Federation (NBBF) announced that Will Voigt would be the head coach for Nigeria at the AfroBasket. Ayinla Johnson and Abdulrahaman Mohammed would serve as assistant coaches. The team announced its preliminary squad on July 22.

Nigeria men's national basketball team roster
Players
Coaches

Pos.	No.	Name	Age – Date of birth	Height	Club	Ctr.
G	4	Ben Uzoh	27 – 18 March 1988	1.91 m (6 ft 3 in)	Lagos Islanders BC	(Nigeria)
G	5	Michael Umeh	30 – 18 September 1984	1.88 m (6 ft 2 in)	Scaligera Basket	(Italy)
F	6	Ike Diogu	31 – 11 September 1983	2.06 m (6 ft 9 in)	Dongguan Leopards	(China)
F	7	Al-Farouq Aminu	24 – 21 September 1990	2.06 m (6 ft 9 in)	Portland Trail Blazers	(United States)
F	8	Jamal Olasewere	23 – 16 September 1991	2.01 m (6 ft 7 in)	VOO Wolves	(Belgium)
F	9	Chamberlain Oguchi	29 – 28 April 1986	1.98 m (6 ft 6 in)	KK Włocławek	(Poland)
F	10	Stan Okoye	24 – 19 March 1991	1.98 m (6 ft 6 in)	Pallacanestro Varese	(Italy)
F	11	Andy Ogide	27 – 1 October 1987	2.00 m (6 ft 7 in)	Poitiers Basket 86	(France)
G	12	Michael Gbinije	23 – 5 June 1992	2.01 m (6 ft 7 in)	Syracuse Orange	(United States)
C	13	Shane Lawal	28 – 18 October 1986	2.08 m (6 ft 10 in)	FC Barcelona Lassa	(Spain)
C	14	Alade Aminu	27 – 14 September 1987	2.10 m (6 ft 11 in)	TED Ankara Kolejliler	(Turkey)
C	15	Olumide Oyedeji	34 – 11 May 1981	2.10 m (6 ft 11 in)	London Lions	(United Kingdom)

Head coach

- Will Voigt

Legend

- Club – describes last
  club before the tournament
- Age – describes age
  on 30 August 2015

=== Uganda ===
Head coach Mandy Juruni announced Uganda's final roster on August 5, 2015. Ivan Lumanyika, who played a key role in the team's qualification, was known as the most notable player to be cut from the squad. Juruni added four new players: Brandon Sebirumbi, Marial Dhal, Stanley Ocitti, and Joseph Ikong.

Uganda men's national basketball team roster
Players
Coaches

Pos.	No.	Name	Age – Date of birth	Height	Club	Ctr.
G		John Balwigaire	25 – 10 August 1990	1.88 m (6 ft 2 in)
C		Marial Dhal	27 – 24 April 1988	2.20 m (7 ft 3 in)	Our Saviour	(Uganda)
G		Jimmy Enabu	–	1.83 m (6 ft 0 in)	City Oilers	(Uganda)
C		Henry Malinga	–	1.97 m (6 ft 6 in)	KIU Titans	(Uganda)
F		Josh Johnson	–	2.08 m (6 ft 10 in)	Stanbic Warriors	(Uganda)
G		Joseph Ikong	–	1.93 m (6 ft 4 in)	DMark Power	(Uganda)
G		Samuel Mukooza	25 – 4 December 1989	1.95 m (6 ft 5 in)	Jämtland Basket	(Sweden)
G		Kassim Nagwere	25 – 23 June 1990	1.87 m (6 ft 2 in)	Fryshuset Basket	(Sweden)
F		Stanley Ocitti	35 – 28 May 1980	2.03 m (6 ft 8 in)
F		Stephen Omony	–	1.98 m (6 ft 6 in)	Falcons BC	(Uganda)
G		Samuel Kalwanyi	20 – 20 March 1995	1.88 m (6 ft 2 in)	City Oilers	(Uganda)
F		Brandon Sebirumbi	25 – 15 May 1990	2.05 m (6 ft 9 in)	Cáceres	(Spain)

Head coach

- Mandy Juruni

Legend

- Club – describes last
  club before the tournament
- Age – describes age
  on 30 August 2015

== Group B ==
=== Angola ===
Angola's final roster as announced in the official website.

Angola men's national basketball team roster
Players
Coaches

Pos.	No.	Name	Age – Date of birth	Height	Club	Ctr.
G	4	Edson Ndoniema	24 – 11 February 1991	1.92 m (6 ft 4 in)	Primeiro de Agosto	(Angola)
G	5	Armando Costa	32 – 3 June 1983	1.90 m (6 ft 3 in)	Primeiro de Agosto	(Angola)
G	6	Carlos Morais	29 – 16 October 1985	1.93 m (6 ft 4 in)	Recreativo do Libolo	(Angola)
F	7	Roberto Fortes	30 – 9 November 1984	1.93 m (6 ft 4 in)	Petro de Luanda	(Angola)
G	8	Hermenegildo Santos	25 – 16 August 1990	1.88 m (6 ft 2 in)	Primeiro de Agosto	(Angola)
F	9	Leonel Paulo	29 – 3 April 1986	1.97 m (6 ft 6 in)	Petro de Luanda	(Angola)
C	10	Valdelício Joaquim	25 – 2 April 1990	2.08 m (6 ft 10 in)	Recreativo do Libolo	(Angola)
F	11	Reggie Moore	34 – 31 March 1981	2.02 m (6 ft 8 in)	Primeiro de Agosto	(Angola)
F	12	Felizardo Ambrósio	27 – 25 December 1987	2.02 m (6 ft 8 in)	Primeiro de Agosto	(Angola)
C	13	Yanick Moreira	24 – 31 July 1991	2.11 m (6 ft 11 in)	Los Angeles Clippers	(United States)
G	14	Bráulio Morais	24 – 17 December 1990	1.85 m (6 ft 1 in)	Recreativo do Libolo	(Angola)
F	15	Eduardo Mingas	36 – 29 January 1979	2.00 m (6 ft 7 in)	Recreativo do Libolo	(Angola)

Head coach

- (Angola) Paulo Macedo

Assistant coach(es)

- (Angola) Jaime Covilhã

Legend

- Club – describes last
  club before the tournament
- Age – describes age
  on 19 August 2015

=== Senegal ===
Senegal men's national basketball team roster
Players
Coaches

Pos.	No.	Name	Age – Date of birth	Height	Club	Ctr.
G	4	Thierno Niang	25 – 8 March 1990	1.85 m (6 ft 1 in)	Geish Army	(Egypt)
G	5	Xane D'Almeida	32 – 21 January 1983	1.83 m (6 ft 0 in)	Tarbes–Lourdes	(France)
F	6	Ibrahima Thomas	28 – 7 February 1987	2.11 m (6 ft 11 in)	Al-Muharraq SC	(Bahrain)
SF	7	Mohamed Diop	34 – 14 May 1981	1.98 m (6 ft 6 in)	Escuela de Oficiales de la Fap	(Peru)
F	8	Antoine Mendy	32 – 16 August 1983	1.98 m (6 ft 6 in)	Orléans Loiret Basket	(France)
F	9	Maleye N'Doye	35 – 19 August 1980	1.99 m (6 ft 6 in)	Paris-Levallois Basket	(France)
G	10	Ibrahima Mbengue	32 – 13 October 1982	2.03 m (6 ft 8 in)	AS Douanes Dakar	(Senegal)
F	11	Mouhammad Faye	29 – 14 September 1985	2.06 m (6 ft 9 in)	Pallacanestro Varese	(Italy)
C	12	Mouhamed Sene	29 – 12 May 1986	2.12 m (6 ft 11 in)	Austin Spurs	(United States)
C	13	Cheikh Mbodj	28 – 1 August 1987	2.08 m (6 ft 10 in)	Czarni Słupsk	(Poland)
C	14	Gorgui Dieng	25 – 18 January 1990	2.11 m (6 ft 11 in)	Minnesota Timberwolves	(United States)
F/C	15	Abdou Badji	23 – 4 April 1992	2.08 m (6 ft 10 in)	SAM Massagno Basket	(Switzerland)

Head coach

- (Senegal) Cheikh Sarr

Assistant coach(es)

- (Senegal) Parfait Adjivon
- (Senegal) Raoul Toupane

Legend

- Club – describes last
  club before the tournament
- Age – describes age
  on 19 August 2015

=== Morocco ===
Morocco men's national basketball team roster
Players
Coaches

Pos.	No.	Name	Age – Date of birth	Height	Club	Ctr.
	4	Reda Ali Harras	21 – 24 November 1993	1.98 m (6 ft 6 in)
	6	Soufiane Kourodu	30 – 21 May 1985	2.09 m (6 ft 10 in)		(Morocco)
	7	Zakaria El Masbahi	36 – 29 March 1979	1.92 m (6 ft 4 in)	Association Sportive de Salé	(Morocco)
	7	Abdelali Lahrichi	22 – 19 July 1993	1.90 m (6 ft 3 in)
	8	Mustapha Khalifi	35 – 1 January 1980	1.77 m (5 ft 10 in)		(Morocco)
	9	Omar Laanani	28 – 26 March 1987	2.08 m (6 ft 10 in)		(Morocco)
	10	Mohamed Choua	22 – 25 December 1992	2.00 m (6 ft 7 in)
	11	Abdelhakim Zouita	29 – 12 August 1986	1.99 m (6 ft 6 in)		(Morocco)
	13	Adil El Makssoud	30 – 12 December 1984	1.95 m (6 ft 5 in)		(Morocco)
	14	Kamal Hachad	32 – 22 July 1983	1.96 m (6 ft 5 in)
	15	Abderrahim Najah	30 – 20 November 1984	1.98 m (6 ft 6 in)		(Morocco)
		Mohamed Aboussalam	18 – 20 August 1996

Head coach

- Jad Fattouh

Assistant coach(es)

- Anton Vujanic
- Abdelaziz Quarouach

Legend

- Club – describes last
  club before the tournament
- Age – describes age
  on 19 August 2015

== Group C ==
=== Egypt ===
Egypt's final roster as announced in the official website.

Egypt men's national basketball team roster
Players
Coaches

Pos.	No.	Name	Age – Date of birth	Height	Club	Ctr.
C	1	Haytham Kamal	27 – 17 November 1987	2.07 m (6 ft 9 in)	Al Ittihad	(Egypt)
G	4	Ehab Amin	20 – 1 August 1995	1.90 m (6 ft 3 in)	Texas A&M–Corpus Christi	(United States)
G	5	Amr Al Gendy	24 – 14 June 1991	1.93 m (6 ft 4 in)	Gezira	(Egypt)
G	6	Ramy Gunady (C)	33 – 20 December 1981	1.85 m (6 ft 1 in)	Zamalek	(Egypt)
G	9	Ibrahim El-Gammal	27 – 23 March 1988	1.91 m (6 ft 3 in)	Al Ahly	(Egypt)
G	10	Ahmed Tawfik	27 – 2 November 1987	1.99 m (6 ft 6 in)	Sporting	(Egypt)
F	11	Aly Ahmed	23 – 15 March 1992	2.06 m (6 ft 9 in)	CSU Bakersfield	(United States)
F	12	Youssef Shousha	22 – 9 June 1993	1.90 m (6 ft 3 in)	Sporting	(Egypt)
F	14	Rami Ibrahim	27 – 6 February 1988	2.04 m (6 ft 8 in)	Al Ittihad	(Egypt)
G	30	Mohamed, Ahmed	22 – 14 October 1992	1.94 m (6 ft 4 in)	Sporting	(Egypt)
C	50	Assem Marei	23 – 16 June 1992	2.06 m (6 ft 9 in)	Minnesota State	(United States)
C	55	Omar Oraby	23 – 8 September 1991	2.18 m (7 ft 2 in)	Gezira	(Egypt)

Head coach

- (Egypt) Ahmed Marei

Assistant coach(es)

- (Egypt) Mohamed Gaber

Legend

- Club – describes last
  club before the tournament
- Age – describes age
  on 19 August 2015

=== Cameroon ===
Cameroon's final squad as shown in the official website of the competition.

Cameroon men's national basketball team roster
Players
Coaches

Pos.	No.	Name	Age – Date of birth	Height	Club	Ctr.
F	4	Arnaud-William Adala	22 – 24 June 1993	1.98 m (6 ft 6 in)	Towson Tigers	(United States)
G	5	Aldo Curti	28 – 27 February 1987	1.80 m (5 ft 11 in)	Dijon Basket	(France)
G	6	Parfait Bitee	30 – 23 July 1985	1.92 m (6 ft 4 in)	Ah-Ahly	(Libya)
F	7	Kenny Kadji	27 – 19 May 1988	2.11 m (6 ft 11 in)	Enel Brindisi	(Italy)
F	8	Harding Nana	34 – 17 January 1981	2.03 m (6 ft 8 in)	Braunschweig	(Germany)
G	9	Jérémy Nzeulie	24 – 15 February 1991	1.88 m (6 ft 2 in)	Nanterre	(France)
G	10	Seoud Njoya	34 – 17 January 1981	1.86 m (6 ft 1 in)	Union Tarbes Lourdes	(France)
G	11	Frank Tchoubaye	23 – 15 April 1992	1.98 m (6 ft 6 in)	San Antonio Malabo	(Equatorial Guinea)
F	12	Alexis Wangmene	26 – 1 March 1989	2.05 m (6 ft 9 in)	Krka	(Slovenia)
F	13	Boris Siakam	28 – 11 September 1986	2.01 m (6 ft 7 in)	Bowling Green Bandits	(United States)
F	14	Steve Moundou-Missi	23 – 7 April 1992	2.01 m (6 ft 7 in)	Aris Leeuwarden	(Netherlands)
F	15	Gaston Essengué	31 – 10 October 1983	2.03 m (6 ft 8 in)	San Isidro	(Argentina)

Head coach

- (France) Michel Perrin

Legend

- Club – describes last
  club before the tournament
- Age – describes age
  on 19 August 2015

=== Gabon ===
On June 11, 2015, head coach Thierry Bouanga announced the 21-man preliminary roster for Gabon.

Gabon men's national basketball team roster
Players
Coaches

Pos.	No.	Name	Age – Date of birth	Height	Club	Ctr.
F		Sylvere Abessolo	31 – 1 October 1983		Somo	(Gabon)
F		Marius Assoumou	31 – 28 March 1984	1.85 m (6 ft 1 in)	Somo	(Gabon)
		Rodrigue Atsu	22 – 5 November 1992		Manga	(Gabon)
G		Yannick Belinga	33 – 29 May 1982	1.83 m (6 ft 0 in)	Somo	(Gabon)
		Cabrel Boundou	–		Stade Mandji	(Gabon)
		Lerry Essono	23 – 11 March 1992		IRB Bordj Bou Arreridj	(Algeria)
G		Lionel Fabre	–	1.88 m (6 ft 2 in)	Tali	(Gabon)
G		Francis Kobangoye	24 – 4 November 1990		Tali	(Gabon)
C		Stéphane Lasme	32 – 17 December 1982	2.03 m (6 ft 8 in)	Galatasaray	(Turkey)
		Marvin Mapaga	22 – 28 February 1993		Hope	(Gabon)
F		Thérence Mayimba	20 – 10 March 1995	2.01 m (6 ft 7 in)	George Mason	(United States)
G		Chris Ndikouedi	–		Hope	(Gabon)
G		Steeve Ndong	–		Manga	(Gabon)
C		Freddy Obame	29 – 6 April 1986	1.98 m (6 ft 6 in)	AS Estuaire	(Gabon)
F		Darlys Ombago	–		USC	(United States)
		Emmanuel Ontala	–		Somo	(Gabon)
F		Axe Ossami	–		AS Estuaire	(Gabon)
F		Fabien Redombina	32 – 31 August 1982		St. Clare	(Philippines)
C		Jason Reteno	37 – 8 October 1977		Tali	(Gabon)
F		Chris Silva	18 – 16 September 1996	2.06 m (6 ft 9 in)	South Carolina	(United States)
		Emeric Wora	–		Stade Mandji	(Gabon)

Head coach

- Thierry Bouanga

Legend

- Club – describes last
  club before the tournament
- Age – describes age
  on 30 August 2015

=== Mali ===
Mali men's national basketball team roster
Players
Coaches

Pos.	No.	Name	Age – Date of birth	Height	Club	Ctr.
PG	4	Ibrahim Saounera	28 – 3 April 1987	1.80 m (5 ft 11 in)	Challans	(France)
G	5	Mahamadou Kante	23 – 2 March 1992	1.92 m (6 ft 4 in)	FUS Rabat	(Morocco)
PG	6	Abdrahamane Maiga	25 – 11 January 1990	1.78 m (5 ft 10 in)	Stade Malien	(Mali)
F	7	Ibrahim Djambo	23 – 14 July 1992	2.08 m (6 ft 10 in)	Hofstra	(United States)
G	8	Waly Coulibaly	27 – 10 February 1988	1.90 m (6 ft 3 in)	Chaminade Silverswords	(United States)
SF	9	Boubacar Moungoro	20 – 22 September 1994	1.96 m (6 ft 5 in)	Getafe	(Spain)
F	10	Mohamed Bah	21 – 22 August 1993	2.06 m (6 ft 9 in)	Drexel Dragons	(United States)
F	11	Namory Boundy	25 – 26 October 1989	2.02 m (6 ft 8 in)	Rueil	(France)
C	12	Boubakar Sidibe	20 – 8 September 1994	2.05 m (6 ft 9 in)	Stade Malien	(Mali)
G/F	13	Sourata Cisse	29 – 16 January 1986	1.96 m (6 ft 5 in)	Souffel	(France)
F/C	14	Mohamed Tangara	31 – 11 August 1984	2.09 m (6 ft 10 in)	Malabo Kings	(Equatorial Guinea)
C	15	Drissa Ballo	19 – 28 November 1995	2.07 m (6 ft 9 in)	Hyeres-Toulon	(France)

Head coach

- Sylvain Lautie

Assistant coach(es)

- Boubakar Kanoute
- Amidou Traore

Legend

- Club – describes last
  club before the tournament
- Age – describes age
  on 19 August 2015

== Group D ==
=== Algeria ===
Algeria's final squad as shown in the official website of the competition.

Algeria men's national basketball team roster
Players
Coaches

Pos.	No.	Name	Age – Date of birth	Height	Club	Ctr.
G	4	Abderrahman Mostefai	26 – 3 May 1989	1.84 m (6 ft 0 in)	GS Pétroliers	(Algeria)
G/F	5	Abdesslem Dekkiche	29 – 27 February 1986	1.96 m (6 ft 5 in)	GS Pétroliers	(Algeria)
G	6	Faycal Sahraoui	36 – 27 July 1979	1.86 m (6 ft 1 in)	Union Basket La Rochelle	(France)
PG	7	Samir Mekdad	28 – 12 October 1986	1.88 m (6 ft 2 in)	Berck	(France)
PG	8	Mounir Benzegala	28 – 7 April 1987	1.78 m (5 ft 10 in)	GS Pétroliers	(Algeria)
F	9	Mohamed Harat	25 – 9 June 1990	1.98 m (6 ft 6 in)	FUS de Rabat	(Morocco)
G	10	Mohamed Zerouali	25 – 27 March 1990	1.91 m (6 ft 3 in)	CSM Constantine	(Algeria)
C	11	Touhami Ghezzoul	28 – 5 January 1987	2.09 m (6 ft 10 in)	GS Pétroliers	(Algeria)
F	12	Kamel Ammour	24 – 17 June 1991	2.03 m (6 ft 8 in)	Brissac Aubance	(France)
F	13	Hocine Gaham	29 – 1 May 1986	1.94 m (6 ft 4 in)	GS Pétroliers	(Algeria)
F	14	Mehdi Cheriet	28 – 12 April 1987	2.01 m (6 ft 7 in)	Roanne	(France)
C	15	Sedik Touati	26 – 25 January 1987	2.15 m (7 ft 1 in)	GS Pétroliers	(Algeria)

Head coach

- (Algeria) Ali Fellali

Legend

- Club – describes last
  club before the tournament
- Age – describes age
  on 19 August 2015

=== Zimbabwe ===
Zimbabwe men's national basketball team roster
Players
Coaches

Pos.	No.	Name	Age – Date of birth	Height	Club	Ctr.
F		Eric Banda	31 – 6 February 1984		Cameo Sigauke	(Zimbabwe)
F/C		Vitalis Chikoko	24 – 12 February 1991	2.08 m (6 ft 10 in)	Scaligera Basket	(Italy)
G/F		Taurai Chitsinde	30 – 1 June 1985		Cameo Sigauke	(Zimbabwe)
PG		Tawanda Chitsinde	27 – 14 August 1988		Cameo Sigauke	(Zimbabwe)
		Neville Chivhangane	–
		Brian Hore	–
G/F		Tatenda Maturure	27 – 14 August 1988		JBC	(Zimbabwe)
		Agrippa Masvisvi	–		Cameo Sigauke	(Zimbabwe)
		Robert Mugabe, Jr.	–		AU Dubai	(United Arab Emirates)
G		Simba Mungomezi	29 – 29 January 1986		JBC	(Zimbabwe)
		Moses Muyambo	–		Mercenaries	(Zimbabwe)
PG		Nyasha Ngove	–		Eastern Cape Windbreakers	(South Africa)
C		Everisto Pasipamire	21 – 28 July 1994		Cameo Sigauke	(Zimbabwe)
G		Duncan Shenje	30 – 25 January 1985		Cameo Sigauke	(Zimbabwe)

Head coach

- Ellery Pinkerton

Legend

- Club – describes last
  club before the tournament
- Age – describes age
  on 30 August 2015

=== Cape Verde ===
Cape Verde's final squad as shown in the official FIBA website.

Cape Verde men's national basketball team roster
Players
Coaches

Pos.	No.	Name	Age – Date of birth	Height	Club	Ctr.
SG	4	Dimitry Akanda-Coronel	23 – 13 August 1992	1.97 m (6 ft 6 in)	Bryant Bulldogs	(United States)
PG	5	Jeffrey Xavier	29 – 7 September 1985	1.89 m (6 ft 2 in)	Medi Bayreuth	(Germany)
SF	6	Ivan Almeida	26 – 10 May 1989	1.98 m (6 ft 6 in)	Chorale Roanne Basket	(France)
G	7	Braima Freire	33 – 19 January 1982	1.86 m (6 ft 1 in)	Fisica Desportiva de Torres Vedras	(Portugal)
G	8	Mario Correia	37 – 17 March 1978	1.89 m (6 ft 2 in)	1 De Agosto	(Angola)
F	9	Joel Almeida	29 – 11 October 1985	1.95 m (6 ft 5 in)	Conservas de Cambados Xuven	(Spain)
C	10	Michael Mendes	25 – 17 August 1990	2.03 m (6 ft 8 in)	Predio	(Cape Verde)
F	11	Fidel Mendonca	31 – 7 July 1984	1.91 m (6 ft 3 in)	Sport Algés e Dafundo	(Portugal)
C	12	Kevin Clay Gomes	19 – 29 October 1995	2.09 m (6 ft 10 in)	FC Porto (basketball)	(Portugal)
PG	13	Brian Rudolph	26 – 17 September 1988	1.80 m (5 ft 11 in)	Loyola Greyhounds	(United States)
F	14	Kevin Coronel	23 – 3 September 1991	1.97 m (6 ft 6 in)	Académica do Mindelo	(Cape Verde)
F	15	Rodrigo Mascarenhas	35 – 24 March 1980	1.97 m (6 ft 6 in)	S.L. Benfica (basketball)	(Portugal)

Head coach

- (Portugal) Luis Magalhães

Assistant coach(es)

- (Portugal) Alexandre Pires

Legend

- Club – describes last
  club before the tournament
- Age – describes age
  on 19 August 2015

=== Ivory Coast ===
Ivory Coast men's national basketball team roster
Players
Coaches

Pos.	No.	Name	Age – Date of birth	Height	Club	Ctr.
F	4	Serzhi Aselaini	23 – 29 October 1991	2.00 m (6 ft 7 in)	TSU Tbilisi	(Georgia (country))
G	5	Mouloukou Diabate	28 – 21 July 1987	1.82 m (6 ft 0 in)	Gravelines	(France)
G	6	Jean-Yves Zahoui	17 – 8 March 1998	1.77 m (5 ft 10 in)	Saint-Brieuc	(France)
G	7	Cédric Kouadio	29 – 24 July 1986	1.81 m (5 ft 11 in)	JCA Abidjan	(Ivory Coast)
F	8	Kehasson Oulai	19 – 20 October 1995	1.98 m (6 ft 6 in)	ABC	(Ivory Coast)
C	9	Morlaye Bangoura	36 – 18 February 1979	2.06 m (6 ft 9 in)	ABC	(Ivory Coast)
G	10	Alassane Meite	23 – 21 September 1991	1.85 m (6 ft 1 in)	ABC	(Ivory Coast)
G	11	Andaman Koffi	30 – 18 May 1985	1.90 m (6 ft 3 in)	Pays d'Ollones	(France)
G	12	Yoli Bahin	32 – 10 July 1983	1.98 m (6 ft 6 in)	Kénitra	(Morocco)
F	13	Éric Tapé	33 – 25 October 1981	1.98 m (6 ft 6 in)	Fecamp	(France)
F	14	Namori Meite	27 – 5 February 1988	1.96 m (6 ft 5 in)	Oullins	(France)
C	15	Seydou Aboubacar	21 – 9 May 1994	2.07 m (6 ft 9 in)	Palencia	(Spain)

Head coach

- (Spain) Natxo Lezkano

Legend

- Club – describes last
  club before the tournament
- Age – describes age
  on 20 August 2013
