= FIBA AfroBasket 2017 =

Men's basketball competition for African nations

AfroBasket 2017

Tournament details
- Host country: Senegal; Tunisia
- Dates: 8–16 September
- Teams: 16
- Venue(s): 2 (in 2 host cities)

Final positions
- Champions: Tunisia (2nd title)
- Runners-up: Nigeria
- Third place: Senegal
- Fourth place: Morocco

Tournament statistics
- MVP: (Nigeria) Ike Diogu
- Top scorer: (Nigeria) Ike Diogu (22.0 points per game)

FIBA AfroBasket 2017 was the 29th edition of the AfroBasket, a men's basketball continental championship of Africa. The tournament was jointly hosted by Tunisia and Senegal. Angola was proposed by FIBA Africa to host the tournament, an offer declined as the country is holding general elections in the same period.

Tunisia won their second title after defeating Nigeria 77–65 in the final, while Senegal caught the third place by beating Morocco 73–62.

== Qualification ==
Event	Date	Location	Vacancies	Qualified
AfroBasket 2015 Champions		(Tunisia) Tunis	1	Nigeria
AfroBasket 2017 Qualification Zone 1	16–18 March 2017; 24–26 March 2017	(Algeria) Algiers (Tunisia) Tunis	2	Tunisia; Morocco
AfroBasket 2017 Qualification Zone 2	19 March 2017; 26 March 2017	(Mali) Bamako (Senegal) Dakar	2	Senegal; Mali
AfroBasket 2017 Qualification Zone 3	14–18 March 2017; 22–26 March 2017	(Benin) Cotonou (Ivory Coast) Abidjan	1	Ivory Coast
AfroBasket 2017 Qualification Zone 4	24–29 March 2017; 19–20 March 2017	(Cameroon) Yaoundé (Central African Republic) Bangui	2	Cameroon; DR Congo
AfroBasket 2017 Qualification Zone 5	12–18 March 2017	(Egypt) Cairo	2	Egypt; Uganda
AfroBasket 2017 Qualification Zone 6 and Zone 7	25–30 March 2017; 19–25 March 2017	(Zambia) Lusaka (Zimbabwe) Harare	2	Angola; Mozambique; South Africa
AfroBasket 2017 Qualification Wildcard	18 April 2017		2	Rwanda; Guinea
Qualifying tournament	19–21 May 2017	(Mali) Bamako	1	Central African Republic
Total			16	

== Host selection ==
On 30 June 2017 FIBA Africa confirmed that Tunisia and Senegal will jointly host FIBA AfroBasket.

== Venues ==
FIBA AfroBasket 2017 (Africa)	(Tunisia) Tunis
FIBA AfroBasket 2017 (Africa)	Radès Sports Hall
FIBA AfroBasket 2017 (Africa)	Capacity: 17,000
FIBA AfroBasket 2017 (Africa)	(Senegal) Dakar
FIBA AfroBasket 2017 (Africa)	Marius Ndiaye Stadium
FIBA AfroBasket 2017 (Africa)	Capacity: 5,000

== Draw ==
The draw was held on 16 July 2017 in Mauritius.

== Preliminary round ==
All times in Radès are UTC+1 and in Dakar are UTC±0.

=== Group A ===
Pos	Team	Pld	W	L	PF	PA	PD	Pts	Qualification
1	Nigeria	3	2	1	245	227	+18	5 (Note: Nigeria 3 Pts, +17; DR Congo 3 Pts, +1; Mali 3 Pts, –18)	Quarterfinals
2	DR Congo	3	2	1	246	224	+22	5	Quarterfinals
3	Mali	3	2	1	246	235	+11	5	
4	Ivory Coast	3	0	3	200	251	−51	3	

Source: FIBA
Rules for classification: 1) Points; 2) Head-to-head results; 3) Points difference; 4) Points scored.
Notes:

8 September 2017
12:00

Boxscore

DR Congo	82–87 (OT)	Mali
Scoring by quarter: 9–15, 14–19, 19–15, 29–22, Overtime: 11–16
Pts: Kabasele 25; Rebs: Kabasele, Shonganya 8 Asts: three players 4		Pts: Kanté 22; Rebs: Sidibe 8 Asts: Moungoro 4

Radès Sports Hall, Tunis

8 September 2017
20:30

Boxscore

Nigeria	78–77	Ivory Coast
Scoring by quarter: 17–11, 25–22, 11–17, 25–27
Pts: Diogu 31; Rebs: Akindele, Diogu 8 Asts: Iroegbu 7		Pts: Koné, Tapé 12; Rebs: Bamba, Koné 8 Asts: Diabate, Toti 4

Radès Sports Hall, Tunis

9 September 2017
15:30

Boxscore

Ivory Coast	60–81	DR Congo
Scoring by quarter: 10–18, 21–15, 16–26, 13–22
Pts: Tapé 19; Rebs: Bamba, Hima 7 Asts: Toti 5		Pts: Kabongo 16; Rebs: Kabongo, Mohamed 8 Asts: Kabongo 5

Radès Sports Hall, Tunis

9 September 2017
20:30

Boxscore

Mali	67–90	Nigeria
Scoring by quarter: 16–20, 17–19, 18–27, 16–24
Pts: Djambo 24; Rebs: Sidibe 9 Asts: Drame 4		Pts: Nwamu 22; Rebs: Akindele 10; Asts: Iroegbu, Mbamalu 5

Radès Sports Hall, Tunis

10 September 2017
15:30

Boxscore

Nigeria	77–83	DR Congo
Scoring by quarter: 20–19, 17–15, 18–18, 22–31
Pts: Diogu 21; Rebs: Akindele 11; Asts: Iroegbu 7		Pts: Shonganya 20; Rebs: Kabasele 8 Asts: Kabongo 8

Radès Sports Hall, Tunis

10 September 2017
20:30

Boxscore

Mali	92–63	Ivory Coast
Scoring by quarter: 30–12, 21–16, 26–21, 15–14
Pts: Drame 21; Rebs: Sidibe 8 Asts: Kanté 3		Pts: Bamba 13; Rebs: Koné 8 Asts: Toti 5

Radès Sports Hall, Tunis

=== Group B ===
Pos	Team	Pld	W	L	PF	PA	PD	Pts	Qualification
1	Morocco	3	3	0	215	189	+26	6	Quarterfinals
2	Angola	3	2	1	213	191	+22	5	Quarterfinals
3	Central African Republic	3	1	2	165	196	−31	4	
4	Uganda	3	0	3	213	230	−17	3	

Source: FIBA
Rules for classification: 1) Points; 2) Head-to-head results; 3) Points difference; 4) Points scored.

8 September 2017
15:00

Boxscore

Central African Republic	66–76	Morocco
Scoring by quarter: 18–14, 15–16, 12–24, 21–22
Pts: Kouguere 12; Rebs: Djimrabaye 7 Asts: three players 1		Pts: Wilkins 15; Rebs: Najah 6 Asts: Lahrichi 4

Marius Ndiaye Stadium, Dakar
Attendance: 4,000

8 September 2017
21:00

Boxscore

Angola	94–89 (OT)	Uganda
Scoring by quarter: 10–22, 19–22, 27–19, 28–21, Overtime: 10–5
Pts: Morais 21; Rebs: Moreira 7 Asts: Costa, Mingas 3		Pts: Opong 23; Rebs: Pegues 9 Asts: Enabu 6

Marius Ndiaye Stadium, Dakar
Attendance: 4,000

9 September 2017
16:00

Boxscore

Uganda	54–57	Central African Republic
Scoring by quarter: 12–18, 16–12, 13–11, 13–16
Pts: Opong 13; Rebs: Kiviiri 4 Asts: Enabu 2		Pts: Grebongo 8 Rebs: Grebongo, Kouguere 5 Asts: Kossangue 2

Marius Ndiaye Stadium, Dakar
Attendance: 4,000

9 September 2017
21:00

Boxscore

Morocco	60–53	Angola
Scoring by quarter: 8–10, 17–12, 15–16, 20–15
Pts: Najah 18; Rebs: El Makssoud 9 Asts: El Makssoud, Wilkins 2		Pts: Moore 13; Rebs: Cipriano 7 Asts: Conceição, Morais 2

Marius Ndiaye Stadium, Dakar
Attendance: 4,000

10 September 2017
15:30

Boxscore

Morocco	79–70	Uganda
Scoring by quarter: 22–21, 11–15, 20–16, 26–18
Pts: Choua, Lahrichi 15; Rebs: three players 4 Asts: Khalfi 5		Pts: Ocitti, Pegues 11; Rebs: Opong 7 Asts: three players 3

Marius Ndiaye Stadium, Dakar
Attendance: 4,000

10 September 2017
20:30

Boxscore

Angola	66–44	Central African Republic
Scoring by quarter: 16–16, 18–4, 17–12, 15–12
Pts: Morais 17; Rebs: Mingas 9 Asts: Conceição, Morais 2		Pts: Kouguere 14; Rebs: Djimrabaye 6 Asts: Kossangue 2

Marius Ndiaye Stadium, Dakar
Attendance: 4,000

=== Group C ===
Pos	Team	Pld	W	L	PF	PA	PD	Pts	Qualification
1	Tunisia (H)	3	3	0	210	170	+40	6	Quarterfinals
2	Cameroon	3	2	1	228	199	+29	5	Quarterfinals
3	Rwanda	3	1	2	212	214	−2	4	
4	Guinea	3	0	3	168	235	−67	3	

Source: FIBA
Rules for classification: 1) Points; 2) Head-to-head results; 3) Points difference; 4) Points scored.
(H) Hosts

8 September 2017
14:30

Boxscore

Guinea	55–75	Rwanda
Scoring by quarter: 11–7, 13–16, 17–20, 14–21
Pts: Mansare 18; Rebs: Mansare 8 Asts: Mansare, Sy 3		Pts: Kabangu 20; Rebs: Ruhezamihigo 10; Asts: Gasana 4

Radès Sports Hall, Tunis

8 September 2017
18:00

Boxscore

Tunisia	68–51	Cameroon
Scoring by quarter: 12–20, 16–11, 13–10, 27–10
Pts: Chennoufi 16; Rebs: Ben Romdhane 13; Asts: Abada, Knioua 2		Pts: Mbala 15; Rebs: Adala 9 Asts: Njoya 3

Radès Sports Hall, Tunis

9 September 2017
13:00

Boxscore

Cameroon	96–54	Guinea
Scoring by quarter: 28–15, 23–11, 24–11, 21–17
Pts: Mbala 24; Rebs: Mbala 6 Asts: Adala, Bogmis 4		Pts: D. Condé 15; Rebs: D. Condé 9 Asts: three players 1

Radès Sports Hall, Tunis

9 September 2017
18:00

Boxscore

Rwanda	60–78	Tunisia
Scoring by quarter: 12–18, 13–12, 19–22, 16–26
Pts: Shyaka 17; Rebs: Gasana 7 Asts: Ruhezamihigo 3		Pts: M. Hadidane 20; Rebs: Ben Romdhane 13; Asts: four players 4

Radès Sports Hall, Tunis

10 September 2017
13:00

Boxscore

Rwanda	77–81	Cameroon
Scoring by quarter: 22–18, 14–23, 17–16, 24–24
Pts: Gasana 18; Rebs: Manzi 7 Asts: Gasana 7		Pts: Adala 17; Rebs: Mbala 15; Asts: Njoya 4

Radès Sports Hall, Tunis

10 September 2017
18:00

Boxscore

Tunisia	64–59	Guinea
Scoring by quarter: 16–19, 17–16, 19–9, 12–15
Pts: Ben Romdhane 12; Rebs: Ben Romdhane 6 Asts: three players 3		Pts: D. Condé 14; Rebs: three players 5 Asts: Mansare 6

Radès Sports Hall, Tunis

=== Group D ===
Pos	Team	Pld	W	L	PF	PA	PD	Pts	Qualification
1	Senegal (H)	3	3	0	250	145	+105	6	Quarterfinals
2	Egypt	3	2	1	197	185	+12	5	Quarterfinals
3	Mozambique	3	1	2	163	216	−53	4	
4	South Africa	3	0	3	156	220	−64	3	

Source: FIBA
Rules for classification: 1) Points; 2) Head-to-head results; 3) Points difference; 4) Points scored.
(H) Hosts

8 September 2017
11:30

Boxscore

Mozambique	47–75	Egypt
Scoring by quarter: 14–16, 8–17, 10–18, 15–24
Pts: Ubisse 9 Rebs: Muchate 13; Asts: three players 2		Pts: Kamal 14; Rebs: Kamal 8 Asts: Gendy 5

Marius Ndiaye Stadium, Dakar
Attendance: 4,000

8 September 2017
18:30

Boxscore

Senegal	83–44	South Africa
Scoring by quarter: 18–12, 24–6, 25–17, 16–9
Pts: Dieng 16; Rebs: four players 5 Asts: Niang 9		Pts: Prinsloo 11; Rebs: Gabriel 9 Asts: five players 1

Marius Ndiaye Stadium, Dakar
Attendance: 4,000

9 September 2017
13:30

Boxscore

South Africa	61–67	Mozambique
Scoring by quarter: 16–19, 13–15, 14–12, 18–21
Pts: Prinsloo 15; Rebs: Mothiba 9 Asts: Prinsloo 3		Pts: Ubisse 13; Rebs: Canivete, Magoliço 6 Asts: Canivete, Chimonzo 4

Marius Ndiaye Stadium, Dakar
Attendance: 4,000

9 September 2017
18:30

Boxscore

Egypt	52–87	Senegal
Scoring by quarter: 14–28, 6–19, 15–19, 17–21
Pts: Bakr, El-Gammal 8 Rebs: Bakr, Mohamed 4 Asts: El-Gammal 4		Pts: Dieng, Mboji 14; Rebs: Dieng 7 Asts: Faye, Hannah 3

Marius Ndiaye Stadium, Dakar
Attendance: 4,000

10 September 2017
13:00

Boxscore

Egypt	70–51	South Africa
Scoring by quarter: 14–2, 12–12, 22–19, 22–18
Pts: Gendy 13; Rebs: Gendy 6 Asts: Gunady 4		Pts: Prinsloo 11; Rebs: three players 6 Asts: Ngobeni, Tholo 3

Marius Ndiaye Stadium, Dakar
Attendance: 4,000

10 September 2017
18:00

Boxscore

Senegal	80–49	Mozambique
Scoring by quarter: 19–12, 19–6, 12–17, 30–14
Pts: Dieng, Thiam 14; Rebs: Mbodj, Ndoye 8 Asts: Hannah 6		Pts: Ubisse 9 Rebs: Ubisse 6 Asts: Novela 5

Marius Ndiaye Stadium, Dakar
Attendance: 4,000

== Knockout stage ==
=== Bracket ===
Quarter-finals
14 September
Nigeria	106
Cameroon	91
14 September
Senegal	66
Angola	57
14 September
Morocco	66
Egypt	62
14 September
Tunisia	81
DR Congo	60

Semi-finals
15 September
Nigeria	76
Senegal	71
15 September
Morocco	52
Tunisia	60

Final
16 September
Nigeria	65
Tunisia	77
Third place
16 September
Senegal	73
Morocco	62

=== Quarterfinals ===
14 September 2017
13:00

Boxscore

Morocco	66–62	Egypt
Scoring by quarter: 13–16, 22–16, 16–18, 15–12
Pts: El Masbahi 17; Rebs: Choua 15; Asts: Khalfi, Lahrichi 3		Pts: El-Gammal 22; Rebs: Gendy 7 Asts: Gunady 5

Radès Sports Hall, Tunis

14 September 2017
15:30

Boxscore

Nigeria	106–91	Cameroon
Scoring by quarter: 25–18, 27–25, 23–27, 31–21
Pts: Diogu 28; Rebs: Ochefu 10; Asts: Iroegbu, Nwamu 7		Pts: Mbala 32; Rebs: Mbala 10; Asts: Njoya, Songolo 3

Radès Sports Hall, Tunis

14 September 2017
18:00

Boxscore

Tunisia	81–60	DR Congo
Scoring by quarter: 18–18, 17–15, 27–12, 19–15
Pts: Ben Romdhane 22; Rebs: Ben Romdhane 14; Asts: El Mabrouk 6		Pts: Shonganya 19; Rebs: Shonganya 9 Asts: Buzangu 3

Radès Sports Hall, Tunis

14 September 2017
20:30

Boxscore

Senegal	66–57	Angola
Scoring by quarter: 19–16, 15–21, 17–8, 15–12
Pts: Adams 11; Rebs: Dieng 8 Asts: Hannah 5		Pts: Paulo 17; Rebs: Moreira 6 Asts: Moreira 4

Radès Sports Hall, Tunis

=== Semifinals ===
15 September 2017
18:00

Boxscore

Morocco	52–60	Tunisia
Scoring by quarter: 9–18, 18–12, 17–17, 8–13
Pts: Najah 12; Rebs: Najah 9 Asts: four players 2		Pts: M. Hadidane 22; Rebs: Ben Romdhane 8 Asts: Abada 5

Radès Sports Hall, Tunis
Attendance: 12,000

15 September 2017
20:30

Boxscore

Nigeria	76–71	Senegal
Scoring by quarter: 15–12, 19–17, 18–16, 24–26
Pts: Mbamalu 19; Rebs: Diogu 14; Asts: Iroegbu 2		Pts: Dieng, Ndour 14; Rebs: Dieng 9 Asts: Niang 5

Radès Sports Hall, Tunis

=== Third place game ===
16 September 2017
15:30

Boxscore

Senegal	73–62	Morocco
Scoring by quarter: 10–18, 21–15, 23–15, 19–14
Pts: Faye 22; Rebs: Dieng 10; Asts: Hannah 5		Pts: Najah 17; Rebs: Choua 7 Asts: four players 2

Radès Sports Hall, Tunis

=== Final ===
16 September 2017
18:00

Boxscore

Nigeria	65–77	Tunisia
Scoring by quarter: 14–8, 10–17, 16–27, 25–25
Pts: Diogu 20; Rebs: Diogu 10; Asts: Iroegbu 2		Pts: Chennoufi 19; Rebs: Ben Romdhane 9 Asts: El Mabrouk 6

Radès Sports Hall, Tunis
Attendance: 12,000

== Final standings ==
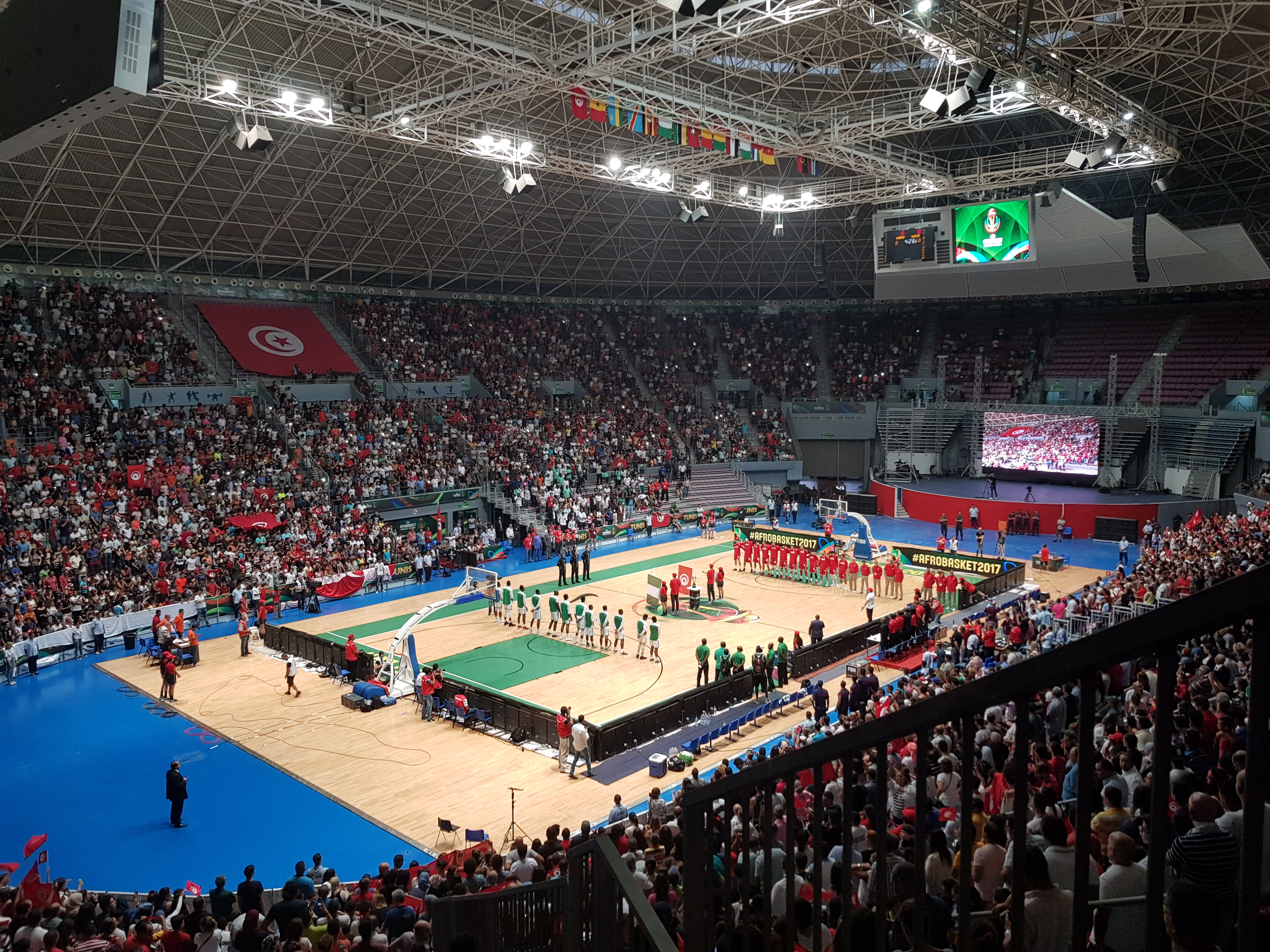
Scene of the final game in Radès on 16 September

Rank	Team	Record
1st place, gold medalist(s)	Tunisia	6–0
2nd place, silver medalist(s)	Nigeria	4–2
3rd place, bronze medalist(s)	Senegal	5–1
4	Morocco	4–2
5	Cameroon	2–2
6	DR Congo	2–2
7	Angola	2–2
8	Egypt	2–2
9	Mali	2–1
10	Rwanda	1–2
11	Central African Republic	1–2
12	Mozambique	1–2
13	Uganda	0–3
14	Ivory Coast	0–3
15	South Africa	0–3
16	Guinea	0–3

== Statistical leaders ==
=== Players ===
Points

Pos.	Name	PPG
1	(Nigeria) Ike Diogu	22.0
2	(Cameroon) Ben Mbala	21.8
3	(Mali) Ibrahim Djambo	17.0
4	(Mali) Mahamdaou Kante	15.3
4	(Uganda) Robinson Opong	15.3

Rebounds

Pos.	Name	RPG
1	(Tunisia) Makram Ben Romdhane	10.5
2	(Cameroon) Ben Mbala	9.3
3	(Nigeria) Ike Diogu	8.7
4	(Mali) Boubacar Sidibe	8.3
5	(Central African Republic) Jimmy Djimrabaye	7.3

Assists

Pos.	Name	APG
1	(Nigeria) Ikenna Iroegbu	5.0
2	(Democratic Republic of the Congo) Myck Kabongo	4.8
3	(Ivory Coast) Mickaël Toti	4.7
4	(Senegal) Clevin Hannah	4.3
5	(Rwanda) Kenny Gasana	4.0

Steals

Pos.	Name	SPG
1	(Mali) Mahamadou Kante	3.3
2	(Rwanda) Kenny Gasana	3.0
3	(Democratic Republic of the Congo) Myck Kabongo	2.8
4	(Angola) Olímpio Cipriano	2.3
4	(Cameroon) Ben Mbala	2.3
4	(Mali) Boubacar Sidibe	2.3

Blocks

Pos.	Name	BPG
1	(Democratic Republic of the Congo) Herve Kabasele	2.8
2	(Democratic Republic of the Congo) Pitchou Kambuy	2.5
3	(Senegal) Hamady N'Diaye	1.0
3	(Guinea) Alfa Ntiallo	1.0
3	(Mali) Boubacar Sidibe	1.0

Other statistical leaders

Stat	Name	Avg.
Field goal percentage	(Guinea) Daouda Vinson Conde	72.0%
3-point FG percentage	(Cameroon) Robert Songolo Ngijol	61.5%
Free throw percentage	(Mozambique) Helton Sergio Ubisse	92.9%
Turnovers	(Guinea) Cedric Mansare	5.0
Fouls	(Uganda) Jimmy Enabu	4.7

=== Teams ===
Points

Pos.	Name	PPG
1	Nigeria	82.0
1	Mali	82.0
3	Cameroon	79.8
4	Senegal	76.7
5	DR Congo	76.5

Rebounds

Pos.	Name	RPG
1	DR Congo	44.5
2	Nigeria	40.5
3	Angola	40.3
4	Cameroon	39.8
5	Ivory Coast	39.7
5	Uganda	39.7

Assists

Pos.	Name	APG
1	Tunisia	17.5
2	Senegal	16.3
3	DR Congo	15.3
3	Egypt	15.3
5	Ivory Coast	14.3

Steals

Pos.	Name	SPG
1	Mali	12.3
2	South Africa	11.7
3	Uganda	9.0
4	Angola	8.0
5	DR Congo	7.8

Blocks

Pos.	Name	BPG
1	DR Congo	6.0
2	Guinea	3.0
3	Senegal	2.8
4	Morocco	2.3
5	Nigeria	2.2
5	Tunisia	2.2

Other statistical leaders

Stat	Name	Avg.
Field goal percentage	Senegal	46.0%
3-point FG percentage	Nigeria	35.1%
Free throw percentage	Cameroon	68.7%
Turnovers	DR Congo	19.5
Fouls	Ivory Coast	27.0

=== Tournament game highs ===
Category	Player game high	Total	Opponent (date)	Team game high	Total	Opponent (date)
Points	(Cameroon) Ben Mbala	32	Nigeria (14 September)	Nigeria	106	Cameroon (14 September)
Rebounds	(Morocco) Mohammed Choua (Cameroon) Ben Mbala	15	Egypt (14 September) Rwanda (10 September)	DR Congo	51	Ivory Coast (9 September)
Assists	(Senegal) Thierno Niang	9	South Africa (8 September)	Senegal	24	South Africa (8 September)
Steals	(Nigeria) Bryant Mbamalou	7	Mali (9 September)	South Africa	26	Senegal (8 September)
Blocks	(Morocco) Mohammed Choua (Democratic Republic of the Congo) Herve Kabasele (Democratic Republic of the Congo) Pitchou Kambuy (Democratic Republic of the Congo) Pitchou Kambuy	4	Egypt (14 September); Mali (8 September); Ivory Coast (9 September); Nigeria (10 September)	DR Congo; Senegal	7	Ivory Coast (9 September); Mozambique (10 September)

== Awards ==
2017 FIBA Africa Championship winners

Tunisia
Second title

Most Valuable Player
(Nigeria) Ike Diogu

=== All Tournament Team ===
- (Tunisia) Mohamed Hadidane
- (Nigeria) Ikenna Iroegbu
- (Nigeria) Ike Diogu
- (Tunisia) Mourad El Mabrouk
- (Senegal) Gorgui Dieng
