= Goporo =

Goporo is a surname. Notable people with the surname include:

- Aubin-Thierry Goporo (born 1968), Central African basketball player and coach, brother of Frédéricque
- Frédéricque Rufin Goporo (born 1966), Central African basketball player and coach
