= Bahin (surname) =

Bahin is a surname. Notable people with the surname include:

- Aristide Bahin (born 1987), Ivorian footballer
- Eudes Bahin (born 1983), Ivorian basketball player
- Louis Joseph Bahin (1813–1857), French-born American painter
- Satya Bahin, Indian politician
