= Mansare =

Mansare or Mansaré is a surname. Notable people with the surname include:

- Cedric Mansare (born 1985), French-Guinean basketball player
- Fodé Mansaré (born 1981), Guinean footballer
