= Glenn Feidanga =

Central African basketball player

Personal information
- Born: February 15, 1994 (age 32) Bangui, Central Africa
- Listed height: 6 ft 8 in (2.03 m)
- Listed weight: 240 lb (109 kg)

Career information
- High school: The Rock School (Gainesville, Florida)
- College: LIU Brooklyn (2013–2017)
- NBA draft: 2017: undrafted
- Position: Power forward / center

Glenn Feidanga is a Central African basketball player who played college basketball for the Long Island Brooklyn Blackbirds.

== International career ==
Feidanga was named to the preliminary Central African Republic squad for the AfroBasket 2015 by head coach Aubin-Thierry Goporo.
