= Dimitri Kongbo =

French basketball player (born 1987)

Personal information
- Born: 8 October 1987 (age 39) Paris, France
- Listed height: 6 ft 9 in (2.06 m)
- Listed weight: 220 lb (100 kg)

Career information
- High school: CJEOTO Academy (Somerset, New Jersey)
- College: Miracosta College (Oceanside, California)
- Position: Power forward

Career history
- 2014: Annecy (France)

Dimitri Alexandre Nils Kongbo (born October 8, 1987) is a French professional basketball player who last played for Union des Clubs Anneciens of the Nationale Masculine 2 (NM2) in France.

== International career ==
Kongbo competed for the Central African Republic national basketball team in the qualifying rounds of the AfroBasket 2015. On June 26, 2015, he was named to the team's preliminary squad for the official event by head coach Aubin-Thierry Goporo.
