= Junior Madozein =

Central African basketball player

Personal information
- Born: October 10, 1987 (age 39) Bangui, Central African Republic
- Listed height: 6 ft 2 in (1.88 m)
- Position: Point guard
- Number: 2

Career history
- 2006–2009: ASOPT (Central Africa)

Joseph Junior Ghislain Madozein (born October 10, 1987) is a Central African professional basketball player who last played for ASOPT of the Central African Division I Basketball League.

== International career ==
Madozein played for the Central African Republic national basketball team at the AfroBasket 2007, where he averaged 1.7 points, 1.3 rebounds, and 0.8 assists. On June 26, 2015, he was one of 20 players to be called up for the team's preliminary squad for the AfroBasket 2015 by head coach Aubin-Thierry Goporo. Others included Romain Sato and James Mays.
