= Michael Mokongo =

Personal information
- Born: July 11, 1986 (age 40) Bimbo, Central African Republic
- Listed height: 5 ft 11 in (1.80 m)
- Listed weight: 175 lb (79 kg)

Career information
- NBA draft: 2008: undrafted
- Playing career: 2002–2021
- Position: Guard

Career history
- 2002–2006: Élan Chalon
- 2006–2007: Orlandina
- 2007–2008: BCM Gravelines
- 2007–2008: Banvit
- 2008–2009: Cholet
- 2009–2010: APOEL Nicosia
- 2010–2011: Ourense
- 2011: Breogán
- 2011–2012: Chorale Roanne
- 2012–2013: APOEL Nicosia
- 2013–2014: Navarra
- 2014–2015: Monaco
- 2016: JL Bourg Basket
- 2016–2017: Aurore de Vitre
- 2018: GET Vosges
- 2019–2021: Trappes SQ Yvelines

Career highlights
- Pro A Rising Star (2005); NM1 champion (2014); Cypriot League champion (2010); Pro A All-Star (2004)
Medals
Men's basketball
Representing France
European U-18 Championship
Bronze medal – third place	2004 Spain	U-18 Team

Michael Benoît Mokongo (born July 11, 1986) is a former professional basketball player.

== International career ==
Mokongo first represented the Central African Republic internationally at the 2009 AfroBasket qualifying tournament. He played for the country at the 2011 AfroBasket, averaging 11 points and a team-high 6 assists. Mokongo has also competed for France in the past, playing for them in the 2006 FIBA Europe Under-20 Championship. He was initially expected to play for the Central African Republic at the AfroBasket 2015 under head coach Aubin-Thierry Goporo, but a knee injury forced him to not compete at the event.
