= Zoran Milović =

Serbian basketball player (born 1977)

ŽKK Vrbas
- Title: Head coach
- League: Serbian first league

Personal information
- Born: 13 July 1977 (age 49) Vrbas, SR Serbia, SFR Yugoslavia
- Listed height: 2.04 m (6 ft 8 in)

Career information
- Playing career: 1996–2014
- Position: Power forward
- Coaching career: 2015–present

Career history

Playing
- 1996–1998: Borovica Ruma
- 1998–2004: Lovćen Cetinje
- 2005–2005: AEL Limassol
- 2005: Keravnos
- 2005: Lovćen Cetinje
- 2006: Zdravlje Leskovac
- 2006–2007: Swisslion Vršac
- 2007: Sloga Kraljevo
- 2007–2008: Rapid București
- 2008: BCM U Pitești
- 2009: Olimpia CSU Brașov
- 2009: Vrbas
- 2009: MZT Skopje
- 2010: Torus
- 2010–2011: Apollon Patras
- 2011–2012: CSȘ Giurgiu
- 2012: SCM U Craiova
- 2012: Timba Timișoara
- 2013: Ulcinjska Rivijera
- 2013–2014: Jagodina

Coaching
- 2015–2019: Timba Timișoara (assistant)
- 2019-2022: ZQP (Head coach)
- 2022-2023: Chongqing (Head coach)
- 2023-present: ŽKK Vrbas (Head coach)

Career highlights
- Champions of The second Romanian league

Zoran Milović (born 13 July 1977) is a Serbian professional basketball coach and former player.
