= Ike Iroegbu =

American-Nigerian basketball player (born 1995)

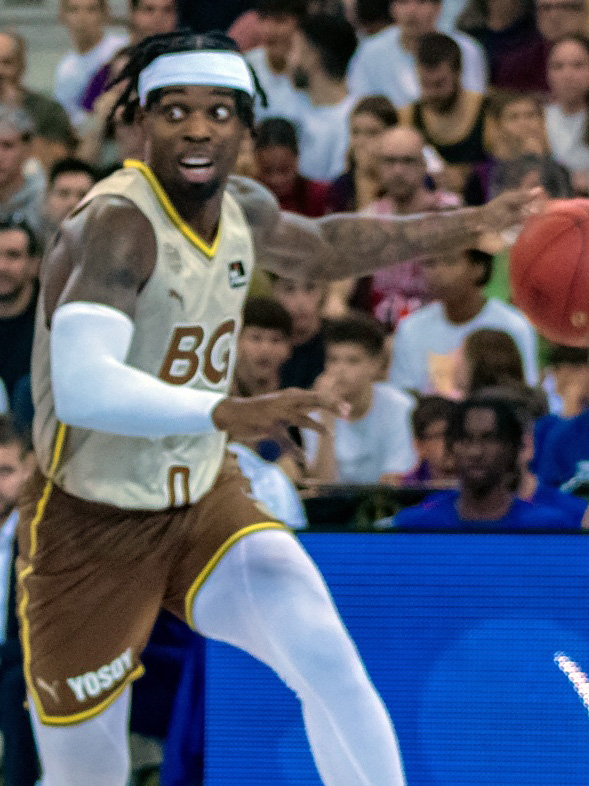
- Ireogbu with Bàsquet Girona in 2024

No. 11 – Zenit Saint Petersburg
- Position: Point guard
- League: VTB United League

Personal information
- Born: March 14, 1995 (age 31) Sacramento, California, U.S.
- Listed height: 6 ft 2 in (1.88 m)
- Listed weight: 195 lb (88 kg)

Career information
- High school: Franklin (Elk Grove, California); Oak Hill Academy (Mouth of Wilson, Virginia)
- College: Washington State (2013–2017)
- NBA draft: 2017: undrafted
- Playing career: 2017–present

Career history
- 2017–2018: Agua Caliente Clippers
- 2018–2019: Science City Jena
- 2019: Lietkabelis Panevėžys
- 2019–2020: Capital City Go-Go
- 2020–2021: Rasta Vechta
- 2021: Élan Chalon
- 2021–2022: Hapoel Galil Elyon
- 2022–2023: Universo Treviso
- 2023–2025: Girona
- 2025: Valencia
- 2025–2026: Varese
- 2026–present: Zenit Saint Petersburg

Career highlights
- Spanish Supercup winner (2025)
- Stats at Basketball Reference
Medals
Men's basketball
Representing Nigeria
AfroBasket
Silver medal – second place	2017 Tunisia/Senegal

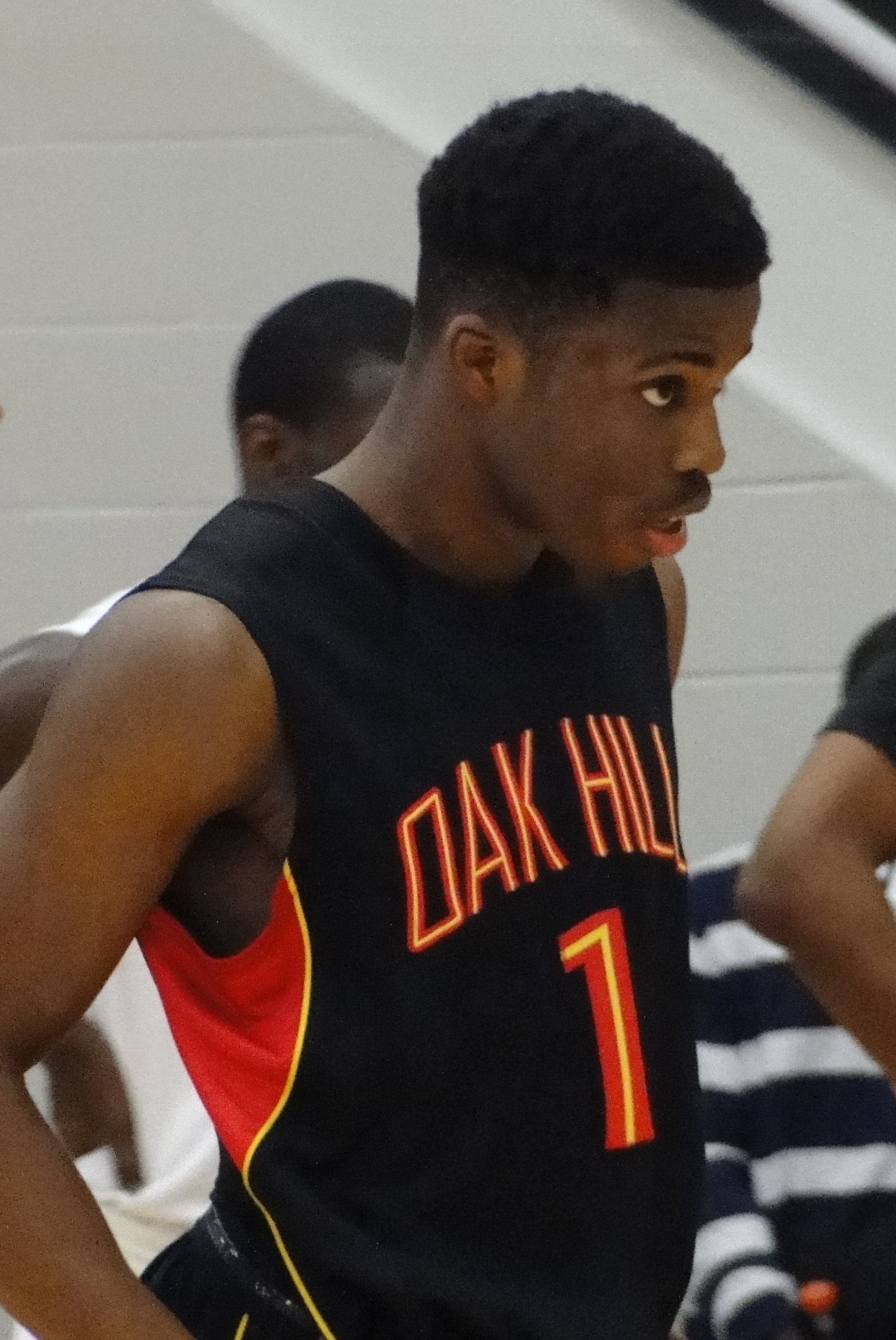
Iroegbu with Oak Hill Academy in 2012

Ikenna Ugochukwu Iroegbu (born March 14, 1995) is an American-Nigerian basketball player for Zenit Saint Petersburg of the VTB United League. Iroegbu played college basketball for Washington State University and is a member of the Nigerian national team.

== Professional career ==
A point guard, Iroegbu was signed by the Los Angeles Clippers in October 2017. He was later waived and sent to play for its NBA G League affiliate the Agua Caliente Clippers, where he averaged 12.24 points, 4 rebounds, and 3.8 assists in the 2017–2018 season.

Iroegbu signed with the German Basketball Bundesliga side Science City Jena on a one-year deal for the 2018–2019 season on July 12, 2018. On February 1, 2019, he joined Lietkabelis Panevėžys of the Lithuanian Basketball League for the rest of the season.

For the 2019–20 season, Iroegbu signed with the Capital City Go-Go of the NBA G League. He missed two games in February 2020 with an ankle injury. On February 12, he tallied 25 points, three rebounds, and five assists in a win over the Erie BayHawks.

On December 20, 2020, he signed with Rasta Vechta of the Basketball Bundesliga. In June 2021, Iroegbu signed with Élan Chalon in France.

On August 13, 2021, Iroegbu signed with Hapoel Galil Elyon of the Israeli Basketball Premier League.

On July 17, 2022, Iroegbu signed with Treviso Basket of the Lega Basket Serie A (LBA).

On July 19, 2023, Iroegbu signed with Bàsquet Girona of the Spanish Liga ACB.

On July 13, 2026, Iroegbu signed a one–year deal with Zenit Saint Petersburg of the VTB United League.

== Nigeria national team ==
Iroegbu participated at the AfroBasket 2017 for the D'Tigers, and averaged 14.8 points, 5 rebounds, and 5 assists per game during the tournament. He was part of the tournaments top Five players.
