= Bryant Mbamalu =

American-born Nigerian basketball player

Personal information
- Born: December 11, 1991 (age 34) Houston, Texas
- Listed height: 6 ft 2 in (1.88 m)
- Listed weight: 193 lb (88 kg)

Career information
- High school: Dulles (Sugar Land, Texas)
- College: Louisiana (2010–2014)
- NBA draft: 2014: undrafted
- Playing career: 2014–present
- Position: Shooting guard

Career history
- 2015: Sameji
- 2015–2016: Óbila CB
- 2016–2017: CB Agustinos Eras
- 2017–2018: Club Deportivo Valdivia
- 2018–2019: CD Aleman
Medals
Men's basketball
Representing Nigeria
AfroBasket
Silver medal – second place	2017 Tunisia/Senegal

Bryant Mbamalu (born December 11, 1991) is an American-born Nigerian former basketball player.

In the past, he played for the Lagos Warriors.

== National team Career ==
Mbamalu has been a member of the Nigerian national team and he participated at the AfroBasket 2017.
