= Central African Republic men's national basketball team =

Central African Republic
- FIBA ranking: 96 ▼1 (3 March 2026)
- Joined FIBA: 1963
- FIBA zone: FIBA Africa
- National federation: Fédération Centrafricaine de Basketball
- Coach: Maxime Zianveni

Olympic Games
- Appearances: 1

FIBA World Cup
- Appearances: 1

AfroBasket
- Appearances: 20
- Medals: Gold: (1974, 1987); Bronze: (1968)
Home	Away

The Central African Republic national basketball team is administered by the Fédération Centrafricaine de Basketball.

The team won the African Basketball Championship twice. It became the first Sub-Saharan African team to qualify for the Basketball World Cup.

== Achievements ==
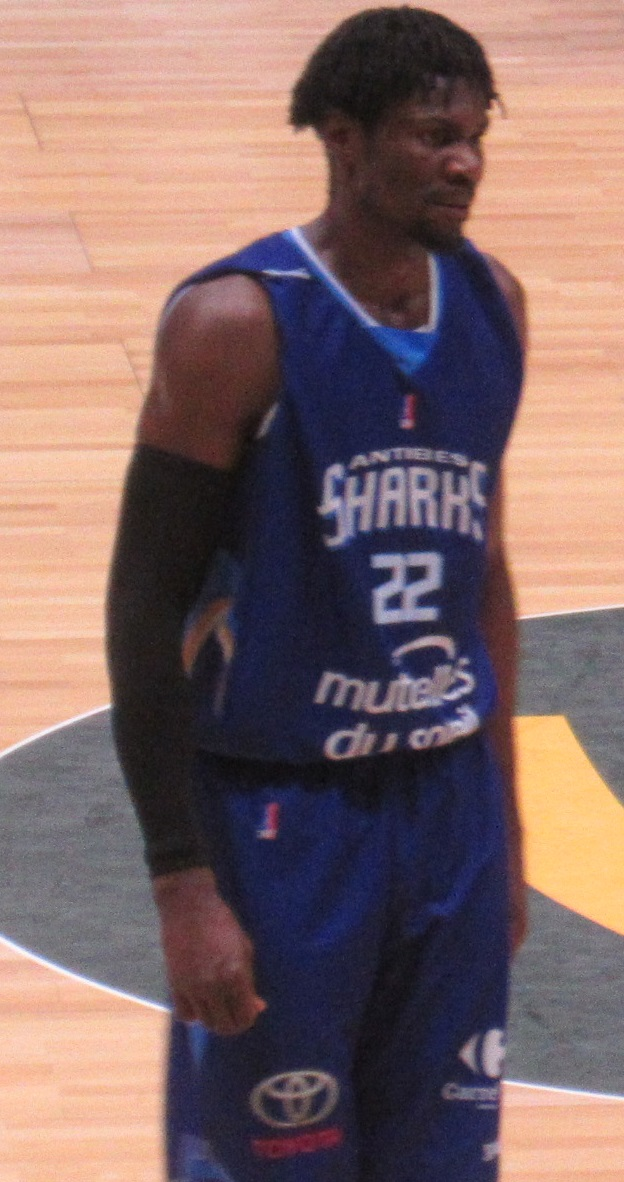
Max Kouguere has been a member of the Central African Republic's national basketball team for many years.

The Central African Republic has won the African Championship twice. Their first title came in 1974 when they hosted the tournament and beat Senegal 72–67 in the final. They hoisted the trophy again in 1987 by defeating Egypt 94–87 for the championship. The team also took third place in the 1968 tournament.

== Performances ==
=== Olympic Games ===
Year	Position	Tournament	Host
1988	10	Basketball at the 1988 Summer Olympics	Seoul, South Korea
2020	Not Qualified	Basketball at the 2020 Summer Olympics	Tokyo, Japan
2024	Not Qualified	Basketball at the 2024 Summer Olympics	Paris, France

=== FIBA World Championship ===
Year	Position	Tournament	Host
1974	14	1974 FIBA World Championship	Puerto Rico

=== FIBA Africa Championship ===
Year	Position	Tournament	Host
1964	–	FIBA Africa Championship 1964	Casablanca, Morocco
1965	–	FIBA Africa Championship 1965	Tunis, Tunisia
1968	3rd place, bronze medalist(s)	FIBA Africa Championship 1968	Casablanca, Morocco
1970	4	FIBA Africa Championship 1970	Alexandria, Egypt
1972	4	FIBA Africa Championship 1972	Dakar, Senegal
1974	1st place, gold medalist(s)	FIBA Africa Championship 1974	Bangui, Central African Republic
1975	–	FIBA Africa Championship 1975	Alexandria, Egypt
1978	–	FIBA Africa Championship 1978	Dakar, Senegal
1980	–	FIBA Africa Championship 1980	Rabat, Morocco
1981	–	FIBA Africa Championship 1981	Mogadishu, Somalia
1983	7	FIBA Africa Championship 1983	Alexandria, Egypt
1985	5	FIBA Africa Championship 1985	Abidjan, Côte d'Ivoire
1987	1st place, gold medalist(s)	FIBA Africa Championship 1987	Tunis, Tunisia
1989	7	FIBA Africa Championship 1989	Luanda, Angola
1992	6	FIBA Africa Championship 1992	Cairo, Egypt
1993	–	FIBA Africa Championship 1993	Nairobi, Kenya
1995	–	FIBA Africa Championship 1995	Algiers, Algeria
1997	5	FIBA Africa Championship 1997	Dakar, Senegal
1999	–	FIBA Africa Championship 1999	Angola
2001	9	FIBA Africa Championship 2001	Morocco
2003	5	FIBA Africa Championship 2003	Alexandria, Egypt
2005	5	FIBA Africa Championship 2005	Algiers, Algeria
2007	7	FIBA Africa Championship 2007	Angola
2009	6	FIBA Africa Championship 2009	Libya
2011	6	FIBA Africa Championship 2011	Antananarivo, Madagascar
2013	13	FIBA Africa Championship 2013	Abidjan, Côte d'Ivoire
2015	14	FIBA Africa Championship 2015	Radès, Tunisia
2017	11	AfroBasket 2017	Senegal/Tunisia
2021	14	AfroBasket 2021	Kigali, Rwanda
2025	–	AfroBasket 2025	Angola

=== African Games ===
- 1991 : (silver)

Beginning with the 2019 event, regular basketball was replaced by 3x3 basketball.

== Team ==
=== Current roster ===
Roster for the AfroBasket 2025 qualification.

Central African Republic men's national basketball team roster
Players
Coaches

Pos.	No.	Name	Age – Date of birth	Height	Club	Ctr.
SG	1	Evans Ganapamo	30 – 19 August 1994	2.01 m (6 ft 7 in)	Njarðvík	(Iceland)
PG	7	Isaiah Washington	26 – 20 July 1998	1.85 m (6 ft 1 in)	SLUC Nancy Basket	(France)
PG	9	Dann Baïgo-Dari	31 – 3 October 1993	1.85 m (6 ft 1 in)	New Tech Université Club	(Central African Republic)
SG	10	Metson Nambaï	29 – 27 February 1995	1.92 m (6 ft 4 in)	Bangui Sporting Club	(Central African Republic)
SF	13	Max Kouguere	37 – 12 March 1987	1.99 m (6 ft 6 in)	C'Chartres Basket	(France)
C	15	Jimmy Djimrabaye	32 – 8 April 1992	2.03 m (6 ft 8 in)	CEP Lorient	(France)
F	17	Emmanuel Amos Nganga Voungbo	20 – 20 December 2004	2.05 m (6 ft 9 in)	Remesha	(Burundi)
C	28	Allan Dokossi	25 – 14 December 1999	2.03 m (6 ft 8 in)	JDA Dijon Basket	(France)
PF	35	Morel Lenguewane	24 – 26 October 2000	2.02 m (6 ft 8 in)	Kenya Ports Authority	(Kenya)
PF	84	Omega Ngaïfei	23 – 14 May 2001	2.04 m (6 ft 8 in)	IR Tangier	(Morocco)
G	88	Yasser Billy Bertin Kamayengue	19 – 16 April 2005	1.80 m (5 ft 11 in)	New Tech Université Club	(Central African Republic)

Head coach

- (Central African Republic) Wilfried Gbongo

Assistant coach(es)

- (France) Maurice Beyina

Legend

- Club – describes last
  club before the competition
- Age – describes age
  on 23 February 2025

=== Head coach position ===
- (France) Jean-Paul Rabatet
- (Central African Republic) Johny Robert Madozein – 2001–2003
- (France) (Switzerland) Michel Perrim – 2007
- (Central African Republic) Eugene Pehoua-Pelema – 2009
- (Central African Republic) Johny Robert Madozein – 2010
- (Spain) Paco Garcia – 2011
- (Central African Republic) Johny Robert Madozein – 2013
- (France) (Switzerland) Michel Perrim – 2015
- (Central African Republic) Aubin-Thierry Goporo – 2015
- (Central African Republic) Ulrich Marida – 2017–present

=== Past rosters ===
- 2013 AfroBasket: finished 13th among 16 teams

Central African Republic men's national basketball team roster
Players
Coaches

Pos.	No.	Name	Age – Date of birth	Height	Club
G	4	Anthony Ghouzy	19 – 30 August 1993	1.80 m (5 ft 11 in)	Tondema
G	5	Tony White Jr.	24 – 22 September 1988	1.83 m (6 ft 0 in)
G	6	Michael Mokongo	27 – 11 July 1986	1.80 m (5 ft 11 in)	Chorale Roanne Basket
F	7	William Kossangue	27 – 9 May 1986	1.98 m (6 ft 6 in)
C	8	Johan Grebongo	19 – 18 January 1994	2.04 m (6 ft 8 in)	Red Star Ndongo Club
	9	Alban Yabanda	21 – 23 June 1992		Red Star Ndongo Club
F	10	Christian Siris	31 – 21 November 1981	1.94 m (6 ft 4 in)	Red Star Ndongo Club
F	11	Max Mombollet	32 – 17 January 1981	2.03 m (6 ft 8 in)
F	12	Martial Gotagni	34 – 2 May 1979	1.90 m (6 ft 3 in)
F	13	Max Kouguere	26 – 12 March 1987	1.98 m (6 ft 6 in)	Le Mans Sarthe Basket
	14	Jose Pascal Ngoko-Molombe	18 – 16 February 1995
F	15	Jimmy Djimrabaye	21 – 8 April 1992	2.03 m (6 ft 8 in)	BCM Gravelines

Head coach

- Fred Goporo

Legend

- Club – describes last
  club before the tournament
- Age – describes age
  on 20 August 2013

At the AfroBasket 2015.

Central African Republic men's national basketball team – AfroBasket 2015 roster
Players
Coaches

Pos.	No.	Name	Age – Date of birth	Height	Club	Ctr.
G	4	Destin Damachoua	29 – 17 August 1986	1.85 m (6 ft 1 in)	CEP Lorient	(France)
G	5	Junior Madozein	27 – 10 October 1987	1.88 m (6 ft 2 in)	ASOPI	(Central African Republic)
F	6	Lionel Pehoua	31 – 8 November 1983	1.96 m (6 ft 5 in)		(France)
F	7	Glenn Feidanga	21 – 15 February 1994	2.03 m (6 ft 8 in)	LIU Brooklyn	(United States)
F	8	Johan Grebongo	21 – 18 January 1994	2.06 m (6 ft 9 in)	BCM Gravelines	(France)
C	9	Dimitri Kongbo	28 – 8 August 1987	2.06 m (6 ft 9 in)	Annecy Basketball	(France)
F	10	Sydney Pehoua	27 – 3 May 1988	1.98 m (6 ft 6 in)	Besançon BCD	(France)
F	11	Yannick Zachée	28 – 29 October 1986	1.92 m (6 ft 4 in)	Tarbes Lourdes	(France)
	12	Séverin Febou	27 – 20 December 1987	1.92 m (6 ft 4 in)	Red Star NDongo Club	(Central African Republic)
F	13	Max Kouguere	28 – 12 March 1987	1.98 m (6 ft 6 in)	Pau-Orthez	(France)
F	14	Philippe Djada	21 – 31 March 1994	1.99 m (6 ft 6 in)	Barjouville Basketball	(France)
F	15	Jimmy Djimrabaye	23 – 8 April 1992	2.03 m (6 ft 8 in)	ESSM Le Portel	(France)

Head coach

- (Central African Republic) Aubin-Thierry Goporo

Legend

- Club – describes last
  club before the tournament
- Age – describes age
  on 30 August 2015

This was the Central African Republic team for the AfroBasket 2017.

Central African Republic men's national basketball team – AfroBasket 2017 roster
Players
Coaches

Pos.	No.	Name	Age – Date of birth	Height	Club	Ctr.
PG	4	Tanguy Samedi	25 – 18 July 1992	1.80 m (5 ft 11 in)
PG	5	Lawrence Nganafio	20 – 23 October 1996
PG	6	Michael Mokongo	31 – 11 July 1986		free agent
G/F	7	William Kossangue-Toro	31 – 9 May 1986	1.98 m (6 ft 6 in)	Stade de Vanves	(France)
F/C	8	Johan Grebongo	23 – 18 January 1994	2.04 m (6 ft 8 in)	AS Saint Maurice Pfastatt	(France)
F	9	Privat Koyamba	20 – 25 August 1997	1.98 m (6 ft 6 in)
F	10	Sydney Pehoua	29 – 13 May 1988	1.95 m (6 ft 5 in)	Besancon Avenir Comtois	(France)
F	11	Eddy Ngoy	20 – 28 January 1997	1.98 m (6 ft 6 in)	ASVEL Basket U21	(France)
G/F	12	Max-Severin Febou	29 – 20 December 1987	1.93 m (6 ft 4 in)
SF	13	Max Kouguere	30 – 12 March 1987	1.98 m (6 ft 6 in)	Olympique Antibes	(France)
F	14	Philippe Djada	23 – 31 March 1994	1.99 m (6 ft 6 in)
F/C	15	Jimmy Djimrabaye	25 – 8 April 1992	2.02 m (6 ft 8 in)	Orléans Loiret Basket	(France)

Head coach

- (Central African Republic) Ulrich Marida

Legend

- Club – describes last
  club before the tournament
- Age – describes age
  on 8 September 2017

Roster for the AfroBasket 2021.

Central African Republic men's national basketball team roster
Players
Coaches

Pos.	No.	Name	Age – Date of birth	Height	Club	Ctr.
C	5	Kevarrius Hayes	24 – 5 March 1997	2.06 m (6 ft 9 in)	Bursaspor	(Turkey)
PG	6	Michael Mokongo	35 – 11 July 1986	1.80 m (5 ft 11 in)	Trappes	(France)
F	7	Kurt-Curry Wegscheider	20 – 30 May 2001	1.94 m (6 ft 4 in)	NBA Academy	(Senegal)
C	8	Johan Grebongo	27 – 18 January 1994	2.00 m (6 ft 7 in)	ASSM Pfastatt	(France)
F	10	Romain Sato	40 – 2 March 1981	1.95 m (6 ft 5 in)	Free agent
G	11	Yannick Zachée	34 – 29 October 1986	1.92 m (6 ft 4 in)	Le Cannet	(France)
C	12	Steven-Emile Perriere	25 – 7 September 1995	2.04 m (6 ft 8 in)	Lincoln Memorial Railsplitters	(United States)
F	13	Max Kouguere	34 – 12 March 1987	1.99 m (6 ft 6 in)	Boulazac Dordogne	(France)
C	15	Jimmy Djimrabaye	29 – 8 April 1992	2.03 m (6 ft 8 in)	Quimper	(France)
PG	16	Jean Nganafio Sokambi	24 – 23 October 1996	1.88 m (6 ft 2 in)	Abeilles	(Central African Republic)
G	27	Metson Nambaï	26 – 27 February 1995	1.93 m (6 ft 4 in)	Abeilles	(Central African Republic)
PF	41	Eddy Ngoy	24 – 28 January 1997	2.01 m (6 ft 7 in)	ASVEL	(France)

Head coach

- (Central African Republic) Maxime Zianveni

Assistant coach(es)

- (Central African Republic) Wilfried Gbongo
- (Central African Republic) Ulrich Marida

Legend

- Club – describes last
  club before the competition
- Age – describes age
  on 24 August 2021

== Kit ==
=== Manufacturer ===
2015–2020: – Peak

=== Sponsor ===
2015 – Orange

== See also ==
- Central African Republic women's national basketball team
- Central African Republic men's national under-18 basketball team
- Central African Republic men's national under-16 basketball team
