= Tuomas Turriago =

Finnish composer, pianist and conductor (born 1979)

- Born: 18 February 1979 (age 47)
- Genres: Classical
- Occupations: Conductor, pianist, composer, pedagogue
- Instrument: Piano
- Labels: Alba, Pilfink
- Website: Official website

Tuomas Turriago (born February 18, 1979) is a Finnish composer, pianist and conductor. Since 2004 Turriago has served as senior lecturer in accompaniment at Tampere University of Applied Sciences. He is recognized as the first Finnish composer to record his entire piano oeuvre.

Tuomas Turriago studied piano under the tutelage of Carlos Turriago at the Central Finland Conservatory and Erik T. Tawaststjerna at the Sibelius Academy. He was awarded first prize at the Kili Piano Competition in Sweden in 1992. Turriago has performed in Finland as a pianist for the Tampere Philharmonic, TampereRaw, St. Michel Strings and the Jyväskylä Sinfonia. He performs at music festivals in Europe, the United States, Colombia and Asia.

Tuomas Turriago is a founding member and conductor of the Tampere Chamber Opera Association. He has conducted the Vaasa, Seinäjoki and Mikkeli City Orchestras, and TampereRaw, Tampere Chamber Orchestra and the Brass Band of the Tampere Philharmonic.

As of Autumn 2010 Tuomas Turriago is a member of the Finnish Composers' Association.

Since 2011 Tuomas Turriago has served as the pianist of Astor Piazzolla's In Time Quintet. He has recorded for Alba Records and Pilfink Records, including an LP in collaboration with trumpeter Jouko Harjanne featuring trumpet sonatas by Harri Wessman, Lasse Eerola, Arttu Sipilä and Turriago.

== Personal life ==
Turriago's Latin music proclivities are said to derive ethnically from his father Carlos Turriago, who is Colombian.
