= Eugène Pehoua-Pelema =

Central African Republic basketball player

Eugène Pehoua-Pelema is a former basketball player from the Central African Republic. He competed at the 1988 Summer Olympics with the Central African Republic national basketball team. He later led the team as the National Technical Director and Head Coach in 2009–2010.

Eugene Pehoua-Pelema is currently the Founder and President of Africa Education Sports (AES), an organization focused on developing basketball talent in Africa and the use of sports and education to develop human and social capital. The organization promotes basketball in the continent in part by facilitating access for young Africans into US high schools and colleges through sports scholarships. To date, over 100 students, including well-known NBA players like Luc Mbah-Moute, have come to the U.S. through AES programs. Africa Education Sports also trains players and coaches in diverse settings; and works with local and international partners to conduct community outreach.
