= Latin American migration to Finland =

Latin Americans in Finland
Total population
- 11,472 Latin American born (2025)^{a}

Regions with significant populations
- Helsinki, Espoo, Vantaa, Tampere, Turku, Porvoo

Languages
- Spanish, Portuguese, Finnish

Religion
- Christianity (predominantly Catholicism)

Related ethnic groups
- Latin Americans in the UK

Latin American migration to Finland means immigrants from Latin America who reside in Finland. As of 2025, there were 11,472 people born in Latin America were living in Finland.

Historical population
Year	Pop.	±% p.a.
1990	915	—
1995	1,498	+10.36%
2000	2,075	+6.73%
2005	3,229	+9.25%
2010	4,833	+8.40%
2015	6,588	+6.39%
2020	8,888	+6.17%
2025	11,472	+5.24%
Latin American born. Source: Statistics Finland

== Demographics ==
=== Nationalities ===
Country of birth
Nationality	Population (2025)
(Brazil) Brazilians	2,780
(Mexico) Mexicans	1,463
(Colombia) Colombians	1,669
(Peru) Peruvians	817
(Chile) Chileans	775
(Cuba) Cubans	654
(Argentina) Argentinians	646
(Venezuela) Venezuelans	541
(Ecuador) Ecuadorians	327
(Nicaragua) Nicaraguans	340
(Dominican Republic) Dominicans	270
(Bolivia) Bolivians	197
(Honduras) Hondurans	177
(Uruguay) Uruguayans	158
(El Salvador) Salvadorans	101
(Costa Rica) Costa Ricans	118
(Guatemala) Guatemalans	105
(Paraguay) Paraguayans	58
(Panama) Panamanians	43

=== Languages ===
As of 2025, Spanish is spoken by 12,088 people in Finland and Portuguese by 4,694; this includes both Spaniards and Portuguese people.

Spanish and Portuguese speakers by municipality in 2025
№	Municipality	Spanish speakers	%	Portuguese speakers	%	Total	%
1.	Helsinki	3,905	0.06	1,389	0.02	5,294	0.08
2.	Espoo	1,611	0.05	594	0.02	2,205	0.07
3.	Vantaa	805	0.03	439	0.02	1,244	0.05
4.	Tampere	733	0.03	284	0.01	1,017	0.04
5.	Turku	645	0.03	282	0.01	927	0.04
6.	Oulu	347	0.02	142	0.01	489	0.02
7.	Jyväskylä	233	0.02	84	0.01	317	0.02
8.	Lahti	223	0.02	89	0.01	312	0.02
9.	Kuopio	211	0.02	45	0.00	256	0.02
10.	Vaasa	181	0.02	52	0.00	233	0.02
–	Rest of Finland	3,194	0.06	1,294	0.02	4,488	0.08
–	Finland	12,088	0.21	4,694	0.08	16,782	0.30

== Notable people ==
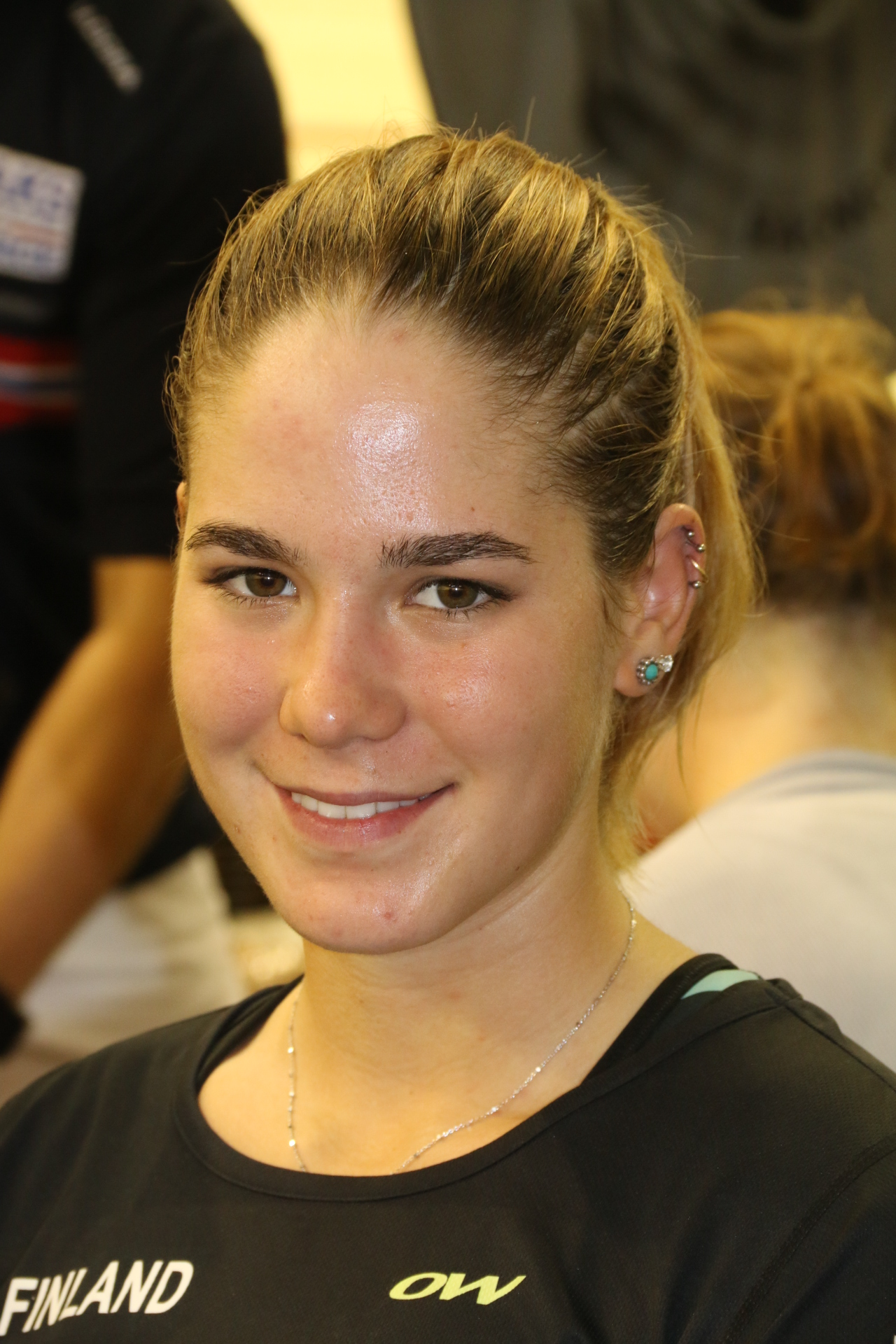
Sara Ferrara

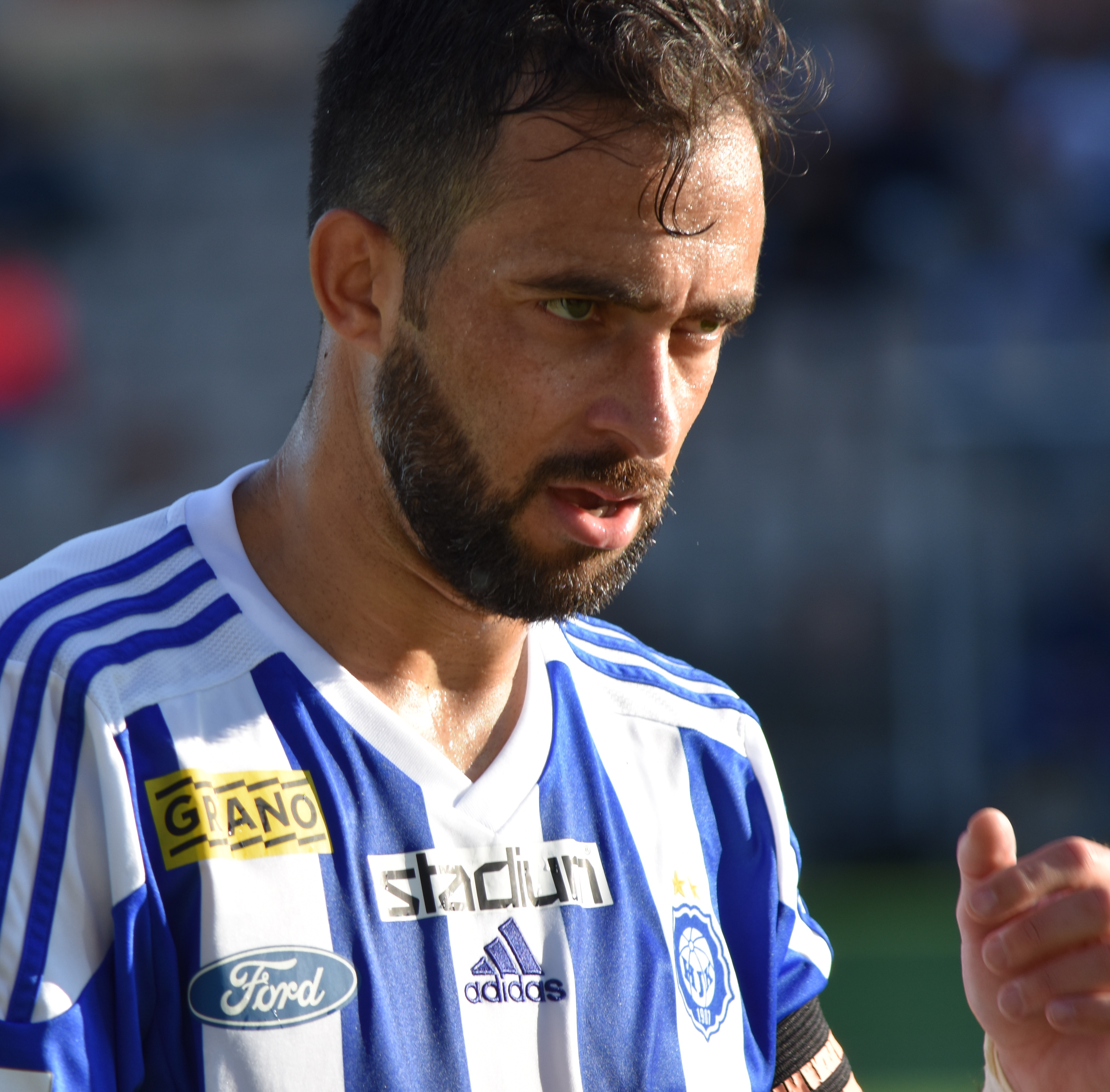
Rafinha

=== Argentine ===
See also categories: descent, expatriates

- Monica Sileoni, gymnast
- Maximo Tolonen, footballer

=== Brazilian ===
See also categories: descent, expatriates

- Daniel Dolenc, basketball player
- Getúlio Fredo, football manager
- Luís Fernando da Silva, youth coach
- Piracaia, former footballer
- Rafinha, football coach and former footballer

=== Chilean ===
See also categories: descent, expatriates

- Matias Kivikko Arraño, footballer
- Diandra, singer
- Marce Rendic, radio personality

=== Colombian ===
See also categories: descent, expatriates

- Felipe Aspegren, footballer
- Camilo Miettinen, ice hockey player
- Tuomas Turriago, composer and pianist

=== Cuban ===
See also categories: descent, expatriates

- Samuel Mahlamäki Camacho, footballer

=== Dominican Republic ===
See also categories: descent, expatriates

- Alex Ciriaco, footballer

=== Mexican ===
See also categories: descent, expatriates

- Sara Ferrara, track cyclist
- Ruudolf, hip hop artist
- Sofia Sida, singer

=== Peruvian ===
See also categories: descent

- Clara Petrozzi, violinist
- Alberto Velásquez, footballer

=== Puerto Rican ===
See also categories: descent, expatriates

- Alex Oikkonen, footballer
- Juan Coca, footballer
- Joseph Marrero, footballer

=== Others ===
- Finnish people of Latin American descent: Cuban, Uruguayan
- Immigrants: Ecuadorian,
- Expatriates: Cuban, Ecuadorian, Nicaraguan, Salvadoran, Uruguayan

== Notes ==
1. ^aThese numbers include the following 19 Latin American countries: Argentina, Bolivia, Brazil, Chile, Colombia, Costa Rica, Cuba, Dominican Republic, Ecuador, El Salvador, Guatemala, Honduras, Mexico, Nicaragua, Panama, Paraguay, Peru, Uruguay and Venezuela. The numbers do not include Puerto Rico because Statistics Finland does not differentiate it from the United States.
