= Andaman Koffi =

Ivorian basketball player

Pays des Olonnes Basket
- Position: Guard
- League: NM2

Personal information
- Born: May 18, 1985 (age 41) Treichville, Ivory Coast
- Listed height: 6 ft 3 in (1.91 m)

Career information
- Playing career: 2009–present

Career history
- 2009-now: Pays des Olonnes Basket

Jean-Philippe Andaman Koffi (born May 18, 1985), is an Ivorian professional basketball player. He currently plays for the Pays des Olonnes Basket club of the French NM2 league.

He represented Ivory Coast's national basketball team on many occasions. At the 2015 AfroBasket he was the whole tournament's best free shooter.
