= BC Timba Timișoara =

BC Timba Timişoara
- Nickname: Urșii (The Bears)
- Leagues: Liga Națională
- Founded: 2006
- Dissolved: 2018
- History: BC Timba Timişoara (2006–2018)
- Arena: Constantin Jude
- Capacity: 2,200
- Location: Timișoara, Romania
- Team colors: Yellow, Black
Home	Away

BC Timba Timişoara was a professional basketball club, based in Timișoara, Romania. The club competed in the Liga Națională and Liga I until it was dissolved in the summer of 2018.

== History ==
The club was founded in 2006 and promoted relatively quickly in Liga Națională, but relegated at the end of the 2014–15 season, after finishing 12th. Timba Timişoara promoted back after two years in Liga I. In the summer of 2018 Timba withdrew from the championship and then was dissolved.

== 2017–2018 roster ==
Note: Flags indicate national team eligibility at FIBA-sanctioned events. Players may hold other non-FIBA nationalities not displayed.

BC Timba Timișoara roster
Players
Coaches

Pos.	No.	Nat.	Name	Ht.
F		(Belgium)	de Thaey, Thomas	2.03 m (6 ft 8 in)
PG		(Romania)	Bölöni, Tamas	1.76 m (5 ft 9 in)
F		(Romania)	Medgyesy, Robert	1.85 m (6 ft 1 in)
C		(United States)	Florveus, John	2.11 m (6 ft 11 in)
F		(Ivory Coast)	Bamba, Tiegbe	2.04 m (6 ft 8 in)
G		(Israel)	Sonenfeld, Alon	1.83 m (6 ft 0 in)
G		(Serbia)	Pavlović, Mladen	1.93 m (6 ft 4 in)
PG		(Serbia)	Jereminov, Branko	1.86 m (6 ft 1 in)
F		(United States)	Naylor, Cameron	2.01 m (6 ft 7 in)
F		(Romania)	Popescu, Bogdan (C)	2.00 m (6 ft 7 in)
PF		(Romania)	Lazăr, Mario	2.01 m (6 ft 7 in)
PG		(Romania)	Rotariu, Liviu	1.92 m (6 ft 4 in)

Head coach

- (Romania) Murărescu Bogdan

Assistant coach(es)

- (Serbia) Milović Zoran

Legend

- (C) Team captain
- Injured

- Roster
