= Dax Gamarde basket 40 =

French basketball team

- Nickname: DGB40
- Leagues: Nationale Masculine 1
- Arena: Arènes de Gamarde-les-Bains; Salle Maurice Boyau
- Capacity: 2,000; 640
- Location: Gamarde-les-Bains, France
- President: Jean Lamaignère
- Head coach: Denis Mettay
- Website: dgb40.fr
Home	Away

Dax Gamarde basket 40 is a French professional basketball team.

In 2019, the year of promotion to the National 1, the club's president Jean Lamaignère praised the substantive work carried out jointly with local communities to convince federal authorities to endorse the club's qualification which was obtained through a victory over Union sportive Avignon-Le Pontet basket-ball.

== Notable players ==
- Set a club record or won an individual award as a professional player.
- Played at least one official international match for his senior national team at any time.

- (France) Gauthier Darrigand
- (Guinea) Cedric Mansare

== Head coach position ==
- (France) Denis Mettay 2019-present
