= Johan Grebongo =

Central African basketball player

No. 18 – Tours
- Position: Power forward / center
- League: LNB Pro B

Personal information
- Born: January 18, 1994 (age 32) Bangui, Central African Republic
- Listed height: 6 ft 9 in (2.06 m)

Career information
- NBA draft: 2016: undrafted
- Playing career: 2012–present

Career history
- 2012–2013: Red Star
- 2013–2015: BCM Gravelines
- 2016–2022: FC Mulhouse
- 2022–present: Tours

Johan Grebongo (born January 18, 1994) is a Central African professional basketball player for Tours of the LNB Pro B.

== International career ==
Grebongo represents Central African Republic in international competition. He competed for his country at AfroBasket 2013 and AfroBasket 2015 under head coach Aubin-Thierry Goporo.
