= Daniel Dolenc =

Finnish basketball player (born 1993)

Tindastóll
- Position: Center
- League: Úrvalsdeild karla

Personal information
- Born: August 10, 1993 (age 33) Espoo, Finland
- Listed height: 2.04 m (6 ft 8 in)
- Listed weight: 103 kg (227 lb)

Career information
- High school: Tapiolan Honka Academy, (Espoo, Finland)
- Playing career: 2010–present

Career history
- 2010–2013: Tapiolan Honka
- 2013–2015: Kouvot
- 2015–2020: BC Nokia
- 2020–2021: Swans Gmunden
- 2021–2022: Les Sables Vendee
- 2022–2023: Karhu Basket
- 2023–2024: M Basket Mažeikiai
- 2024–2025: SCM U Craiova
- 2025–2026: HKK Široki
- 2026–present: Tindastóll

Career highlights
- Austrian League champion (2021)

Daniel Emil-Luciano Dolenc (born 10 August 1993) is a Finnish professional basketball player who plays for Icelandic team Tindastóll. Dolenc started playing basketball in youth teams of Espoo Basket Team, continuing his senior career in 2010 with Tapiolan Honka, competing in Finnish first-tier Korisliiga.

== Professional career ==
=== Kouvot (2013–2015) ===
In 2013, Dolenc signed for Kouvot. He played there for two seasons averaging 4.8 points and 2.6 rebounds.

=== Nokia (2015–2020) ===
In 2015, he signed for BC Nokia. He played there for five seasons averaging 8.5 points and 3.7 rebounds.

=== Swans Gmunden (2020–2021) ===
After spending five seasons with BC Nokia, Dolenc moved to Austria to play for Swans Gmunden for the 2020–2021 season, where he averaged 10.6 points, 4.8 rebounds and shot 60% from the field. They went on to win the Austrian Basketball Bundesliga championship, coached by his fellow countryman Anton Mirolybov.

=== Les Sables Vendes (2021–2022) ===
In 2021, he moved to France to third-tier side Les Sables Vendée in Nationale Masculine 1. He averaged 8.5 points and 4.6 rebounds.

=== Karhu Basket (2022–2023) ===
In 2022, Dolenc returned to Finland to play with the Finnish reigning champions Karhu Basket. He averaged 10.2 points and 4.1 rebounds. The club advanced to the semi finals of the 2022–23 FIBA Europe Cup, and won the silver medal in Korisliiga.

=== Mažeikiai (2023–2024) ===
After a great season with Karhu Basket, Dolenc signed with Lithuanian club BC Mažeikiai of the LKL for the 2023–24 season. On 29 October 2023, Dolenc dislocated his kneecap in a match against BC Šiauliai, while fighting for a loose ball and simultaneously colliding with a teammate.

=== SCM U Craiova (2024–2025) ===
Dolenc signed with SCM U Craiova in the Romanian Liga Națională for the 2024–25 season. He averaged 7.4 points, 3.1 rebounds and 1.2 assists.

=== HKK Široki (2025–2026) ===
Dolenc signed with Bosnian team HKK Široki for the 2025–26 season.

=== Tindastóll (2026–present) ===
In February 2026, Dolenc signed with Tindastóll of the Icelandic Úrvalsdeild karla.

== International career ==
A former youth international, Dolenc has played 18 games for Finland senior national team.

== Personal life ==
Dolenc was born in Espoo, Finland, to Finnish-Swedish mother and a father of Brazilian origin.
