= William Kossangue =

Central African basketball player

Free agent
- Position: Shooting guard / small forward

Personal information
- Born: March 9, 1986 (age 40) Bangui, Central African Republic
- Listed height: 6 ft 6 in (1.98 m)
- Listed weight: 210 lb (95 kg)

Career information
- High school: Harmony Prep (Cincinnati, Ohio)
- College: Tyler JC (2006–2008); Campbell (2008–2010)

Career history
- 2012–2013: Luçon Basket (France)

William Stèvie Kossangue-Toro (born March 9, 1986) is a Central African professional basketball player who currently plays for Union Sportive Alfortville Basket of the Nationale Masculine 3 (NM3).

== Early life ==
Kossangue was born on March 9, 1986, in Bangui, Central African Republic. His father, Jean, was an attorney.

== Collegiate career ==
Kossangue played college basketball at Tyler Junior College before transferring to play with the Campbell Fighting Camels.

== International career ==
Kossangue has previously represented Central African Republic in international competition. He played for his country at the 2009, 2011, and 2013 AfroBaskets. Kossangue was named to the 20-man preliminary squad for Central African Republic at the AfroBasket 2015 by head coach Aubin-Thierry Goporo. However, he was ruled out of the squad for the official event.
