= Ooredoo Tunisia =

Tunisian telecommunications company

- Formerly: Tunisiana (2002—2014)
- Company type: Public company
- Industry: Telecommunications; Internet
- Founded: 2002
- Headquarters: Lac 2 in Tunis, Tunisia.
- Key people: Mansoor Al Khater
- Parent: Ooredoo
- Website: www.ooredoo.tn

Ooredoo Tunisia (previously Tunisiana) is a private telecommunications company in Tunisia. Set up with capital of 330 million Tunisian dinars, it was founded on 11 May 2002. Ooredoo Tunisia is part of the Ooredoo Group. With over 7.5 million subscribers, it is the largest operator in Tunisia.

== History ==
Ooredoo Tunisia started commercial operations on 27 December 2002. Six months later, its mobile phone network covered 60% of the Tunisian population. As of June 30, 2006, it had more than 2.5 million subscribers and has now more than 5 million subscribers. As of 2005, the network covered 99% of the population. In early-2006, Ooredoo Tunisia launched GPRS and EDGE on the Tunisian market.

On 24 May 2012 the company secured licenses to deliver 3G and fixed services. Tunisiana changed its name to Ooredoo Tunisia on 24 April 2014.

Tunisiana changed its name to Ooredoo Tunisia on 24 April 2014.

== Corporate governance ==
26 November 2015 – 5 November 2019: CEO : Youssef El Masri (Lebanon).

Since November 2019 : actual CEO: Mansour Rashid Al Khater.
