= Samuel Mukooza =

Ugandan basketball player

Personal information
- Born: 4 December 1989 (age 36) Kampala, Uganda
- Listed height: 6 ft 5 in (1.96 m)

Career information
- Playing career: 2007–present
- Position: Shooting guard

Career history
- 2014–2018: Trelleborg Basket

Samuel Mukooza (born 4 December 1989) is an Ugandan retired basketball player. His last professional team was Trelleborg Basket of the Swedish Basketettan.

He represented Uganda's national basketball team at the 2015 AfroBasket, where he was his team's best passer.
