= Eudes Bahin =

Ivorian professional basketball player

ASFAR
- Position: Guard
- League: Nationale 1

Personal information
- Born: 10 July 1983 (age 43) Abidjan, Ivory Coast
- Listed height: 6 ft 6 in (1.98 m)

Career information
- Playing career: 2010–present

Career history
- 2007-2015: KAC Kenitra (Morocco)
- 2016-present: ASFAR (Morocco)

Yoli Eudes Paul Bahin (born 10 July 1983) is an Ivorian professional basketball player. He currently plays for ASFAR of the Moroccan Nationale 1 basketball league.

He was a member of the Ivory Coast's national basketball team at the AfroBasket 2015 in Radès, Tunisia.
