= Maxime Zianveni =

French-born Central African basketball player and coach

Personal information
- Born: 29 December 1979 (age 46) Nancy, France
- Listed height: 1.98 m (6 ft 6 in)

Career information
- Playing career: 1997–2020
- Position: Power forward
- Number: 54
- Coaching career: 2020–present

Career history

Playing
- 1997–2007: SLUC Nancy Basket
- 2007–2008: AEL Limassol
- 2008: APOEL Nicosia
- 2009: Hyères-Toulon Var
- 2009–2010: Élan Chalon
- 2010–2011: STB Le Havre
- 2011–2013: Strasbourg IG
- 2013–2015: SLUC Nancy Basket
- 2015–2016: Charleville
- 2016–2017: Boulazac
- 2017–2020: Le Cannet

Coaching
- 2020–2021: Le Cannet
- 2021–present: Central African Republic
- 2022–2024: SLUC Nancy Basket (assistant)

Career highlights
- Korać Cup winner (2002)

Maxime Zianveni (born 29 December 1979) is a French-born Central African professional basketball coach and former player, who played at the power forward position. He is current head coach of the Central African Republic national basketball team. He played for several clubs in France during his playing career.

== Coaching career ==
On 23 April 2020, Zianveni signed as head coach of Le Cannet of the Nationale Masculine 2 (NM2), France's fourth tier league.

He became the head coach of the Central African Republic national basketball team in 2021, and coached the country at FIBA AfroBasket 2021.

On July 6, 2022, he has signed with SLUC Nancy Basket of the LNB Pro A as an assistant coach.
