= Oyedeji =

Oyedeji is a surname. Notable people with the surname include:

- James Oyedeji (1953–2016), Ghanaian sports historian
- Nathan Butler-Oyedeji (born 2003), English footballer
- Olumide Oyedeji (born 1981), Nigerian basketballer
