= Taurai Chitsinde =

Zimbabwean basketball player

Cameo Sigauke
- Position: Shooting guard / small forward
- League: Harare Basketball Association

Personal information
- Born: June 1, 1985 (age 41) Harare, Zimbabwe

Tauarai Lawrence Chitsinde (born June 1, 1985) is a Zimbabwean professional basketball player who currently plays for Cameo Sigauke of the Harare Basketball Association (HBA). The swingman is the captain of the Zimbabwe national basketball team.

== International career ==
Chitsinde captains the Zimbabwe national basketball team. In the preliminary rounds of the AfroBasket 2007, he averaged 1.2 points, 1.8 rebounds, and 1.0 assists. In the AfroBasket 2009 qualifiers, Chitsinde averaged 3.0 points, 3.5 rebounds, and 0.8 assists. Following Zimbabwe's first-ever qualification into the AfroBasket in 2015, Chitsinde said, "My team played well. This is our first time to qualify so it is a big achievement for us. We worked hard as a team and hope to do much better since we will be facing more experienced teams." On August 6, 2015, he was named to Zimbabwe's 14-man preliminary squad for the event.
