= Frédéricque Rufin Goporo =

Central African basketball player and coach

Personal information
- Born: August 8, 1966 (age 60)
- Listed height: 5 ft 9 in (1.75 m)
- Listed weight: 163 lb (74 kg)

Frédéricque Rufin Goporo (born 8 August 1966) is a Central African former basketball player and coach. He was elected Most Valuable Player at the FIBA Africa Championship 1987, a tournament his team won. Goporo competed at the 1988 Summer Olympics with the Central African Republic national basketball team and scored in double digits for 6 out of the team's 7 games. He also coached the team from 2012 to 2013.

He is the older brother of fellow basketball player and coach Aubin-Thierry Goporo.
