= Tiegbe Bamba =

French–Ivorian basketball player

Personal information
- Born: 21 January 1991 (age 35) Sarcelles, France
- Listed height: 2.01 m (6 ft 7 in)
- Listed weight: 205 lb (93 kg)

Career information
- NBA draft: 2015: undrafted
- Playing career: 2015–present
- Position: Power forward

Career history
- 2015–2016: Chalons-Reims
- 2016: Psyhiko Athens
- 2017: Timba Timișoara
- 2018: STB Le Havre
- 2018–2019: Grindavík
- 2019: C'Chartres Basket
- 2020: Aix Maurienne Savoie Basket
- 2021–2022: Kaysersberg
- 2022: Rouen

Tiegbe Bamba (born 21 January 1991) is a French-born Ivorian professional basketball player and a member of the Ivory Coast national team.

== Club career ==
Bamba started playing for the Limoges Under 21 Basketball club in the Pro A French U21 basketball league at the age of 19. During the 2015–2016 season, he played for the Châlons-Reims in the French Jeep Elite league where he averaged 2.5 points.

In 2016, he moved to the Greek side Psyhiko Athens where he averaged 6.7 points in three games.

In 2017, he signed with Liga Națională club BC Timba Timișoara where he averaged 9.2 points per game. In the same season, he moved to the LNB Pro B club STB Le Havre where he averaged 4.5 points.

In October 2018, Bamba signed with Úrvalsdeild karla club Grindavík. He was released by the club on 1 February 2019. In 11 games for Grindavík, he averaged 15.1 points and 9.2 rebounds per game. In January 2018 he moved to the C'Chartres Basket where he averaged 9.8 points per game.

In 2020, Bamba signed with Aix Maurienne Savoie Basket where he averaged 6.2 points in 10 games.

== Ivorian National team ==
Bamba represents the Ivory Coast national basketball team. He participated at 2019 FIBA Basketball World Cup where he averaged 6 points.
