= Pays des Olonnes Basket =

- Leagues: NM2
- Founded: 2006
- Arena: Salle Beauséjour
- Location: Olonne-sur-Mer, France
- Website: Official website

Pays des Olonnes Basket is a French professional basketball team located in Olonne-sur-Mer, France. The team currently competes in the NM2.

The club is internationally known because some of its players have represented their African national teams at the FIBA Africa Championship.

== Notable players ==
To appear in this section a player must have either:

- Set a club record or won an individual award as a professional player.
- Played at least one official international match for his senior national team or one NBA game at any time.
- (Ivory Coast) Andaman Koffi
- (Morocco) Naim El Khdar
- (Finland) Daniel Dolenc
