= Cedric Mansare =

French basketball player (born 1985)

Free agent
- Position: Shooting guard / small forward

Personal information
- Born: 18 October 1985 (age 41) Le Mans, France
- Listed height: 1.95 m (6 ft 5 in)
- Listed weight: 102 kg (225 lb)

Career information
- Playing career: 2005–present

Career history
- 2005–2006: Étendard de Brest
- 2006–2007: Pully Lausanne Foxes
- 2010–2011: Denek Bar Urcuit
- 2011–2012: Rueil
- 2012–2013: Sorgues Basket Club
- 2013–2014: JA Vichy
- 2018–2020: Feurs Enfants du Forez
- 2020–2021: Union Dax Gamarde

Cedric Mansare (born 18 October 1985) is a French-Guinean basketball player who plays for Union Dax Gamarde and Guinea. Standing at 1.95 m (6 ft 5 in), he plays as shooting guard or small forward.

== National team career ==
Mansare represents the Guinea national basketball team internationally. At AfroBasket 2021, Mansare averaged 14 points per game and helped his team reach the quarterfinals.
