= Yannick Zachée =

Central African basketball player

Yannick Zachee (born 29 October 1986 in Meulan, France) is a Central African basketball player who is a member of the Central African Republic national basketball team. Born in France, he represents Central African Republic internationally.

Zachee formerly played for Fos Ouest Provence Basket of the French Basketball League. Previously, Zachee had played for Chorale Roanne Basket and JA Vichy of the Ligue Nationale de Basketball.

Zachee was a member of the Central African Republic national basketball team that finished sixth at the 2009 FIBA Africa Championship.
