= Mounir Benzegala =

Algerian basketball player

No. 8 – GS Pétroliers
- Position: Point guard
- League: Super Division

Personal information
- Born: April 7, 1987 (age 39)
- Listed height: 5 ft 10 in (1.78 m)
- Listed weight: 184.8 lb (84 kg)

Career history
- 2010–2012: CSM Constantine
- 2012–2019: GS Pétroliers

Mounir Benzegala (born 7 April 1987) is a former Algerian professional basketball player and current coach. also was the starting point guard for the starting point guard for the Algerian National Team.

== Honours ==
=== Club ===
GS Pétroliers

- Super Division: 2014, 2015, 2016.
- Algerian Basketball Cup: 2013, 2014, 2015, 2016.
