= Max Kouguère =

Central African basketball player

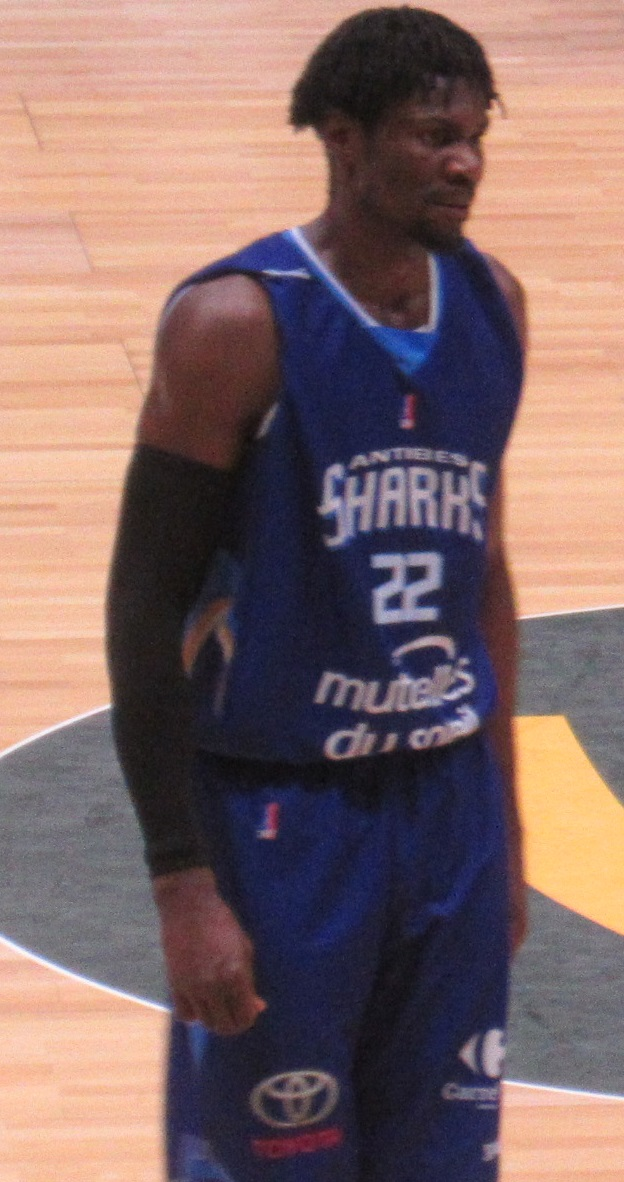
- Kouguère with Antibes Sharks in March 2017

No. 22 – Bangui Sporting Club
- Position: Small forward
- League: Road to BAL

Personal information
- Born: 12 March 1987 (age 39) Brazzaville, Republic of the Congo
- Listed height: 6 ft 6 in (1.98 m)
- Listed weight: 209 lb (95 kg)

Career information
- Playing career: 2005–present

Career history
- 2005–2007: Inter Club Brazzaville
- 2007–2009: BCM Gravelines
- 2009–2010: Olympique Antibes
- 2010–2011: Lions de Genève
- 2011–2012: Le Mans
- 2012–2013: STB Le Havre
- 2013–2014: Manresa
- 2014–2015: Orléans Loiret
- 2015–2016: Élan Béarnais Pau-Orthez
- 2016–2019: Antibes Sharks
- 2019: Rouen
- 2019–2020: Saint-Chamond
- 2020–2021: Boulazac Dordogne
- 2021–2022: Phoenix Brussels
- 2022–present: Bangui Sporting Club
- Stats at Basketball Reference

Max Martial Kouguère (born 12 March 1987) is a Central African professional basketball player who currently plays for Bangui Sporting Club. He is a member of the Central African Republic national basketball team.

== Professional career ==
Before signing with Olympique Antibes for the 2009–10 season, Kouguère played for fellow French League team BCM Gravelines. He rarely saw action, playing only 64 minutes spread out over 11 games during the season. Despite this, the 6 ft 6 in (1.98 m) Kouguère gained a cult following in France through his dunking ability and participation in several slam dunk contests in France.

On 23 September 2021, Kouguere signed with Belgian club Phoenix Brussels of the BNXT League.

In October 2022, Kouguere played for Bangui Sporting Club in the 2023 BAL qualification. He made his debut on 12 October against Espoir.

== National team career ==
Kouguère was a member of the Central African Republic national basketball team that finished sixth at the 2009 FIBA Africa Championship, averaging 9.3 PPG.
