= AfroBasket 2015 =

Tournament details
- Host country: Tunisia
- City: Tunis
- Dates: 19–30 August
- Teams: 16
- Venue: 1 (in 1 host city)

Final positions
- Champions: Nigeria (1st title)
- Runners-up: Angola
- Third place: Tunisia
- Fourth place: Senegal

Tournament statistics
- MVP: (Nigeria) Chamberlain Oguchi
- Top scorer: (Senegal) Gorgui Dieng (22.9 points per game)

AfroBasket 2015 was the 28th edition of the AfroBasket, a men's basketball continental championship of Africa. It also served as the qualifying tournament for FIBA Africa at the 2016 Summer Olympics Basketball Tournament in Brazil. The tournament was held in Tunis, Tunisia. The winner qualified for the 2016 Summer Olympics Basketball Tournament.

Nigeria won their first ever AfroBasket, beating Angola in the final 74–65. Chamberlain Oguchi was named tourney MVP.

By winning the title, Nigeria automatically qualified for the 2016 Olympics. The next three best-placed teams, Angola, Tunisia, and Senegal, each secured a spot in the final FIBA World Olympic qualifying tournament.

== Qualification ==
Already qualified:

- Defending champions:
  - Angola
- Hosts:
  - Tunisia
- Zone 1
  - Morocco
- Zone 2
  - Cape Verde
  - Mali
- Zone 3
  - Ivory Coast
  - Nigeria
- Zone 4
  - Cameroon
  - Gabon
- Zone 5
  - Egypt
  - Uganda
- Zone 6
  - Zimbabwe
  - Mozambique
- Zone 7
  - None
- Wild cards
  - Central African Republic
  - Senegal
  - Algeria

== Venue ==
AfroBasket 2015 was supposed to have been held in the tourist cities of Nabeul and Hammamet. However, due to the attacks in Sousse in June 2015, the venue was moved to Radès, just outside Tunis.

Tunis	AfroBasket 2015 (Tunisia)
Radès Sports Hall	AfroBasket 2015 (Tunisia)
Capacity: 17,000	AfroBasket 2015 (Tunisia)

== Preliminary round ==
=== Group A ===
Pos	Team	Pld	W	L	PF	PA	PD	Pts
1	Tunisia (H)	3	3	0	215	166	+49	6
2	Nigeria	3	2	1	245	192	+53	5
3	Central African Republic	3	1	2	175	212	−37	4
4	Uganda	3	0	3	170	235	−65	3

First match(es) will be played: 19 August 2015. Source: FIBA
Rules for classification: (1) Tournament points, (2) Head-to-head tournament points, (3) Head-to-head goal average, (4) Overall goal average, (5) Drawing of lots
(H) Hosts

19 August
15:00

Boxscore

Nigeria	88–63	Central African Republic
Scoring by quarter: 16–12, 33–23, 20–12, 19–16
Pts: Aminu 15; Rebs: Lawal 14; Asts: Uzoh 4		Pts: Damachoua 15; Rebs: Kouguere 5 Asts: Djimrabaye 4

19 August
21:00

Boxscore

Tunisia	77–55	Uganda
Scoring by quarter: 24–18, 14–10, 20–16, 19–11
Pts: Ben Romdhane 24; Rebs: Mejri 10; Asts: Roll 5		Pts: Ocitti 20; Rebs: Omwony 5 Asts: Nagwere 4

21 August
16:00

Boxscore

Uganda	59–98	Nigeria
Scoring by quarter: 16–27, 14–21, 11–32, 18–18
Pts: Omwony 20; Rebs: Omwony 9 Asts: Mukooza 3		Pts: Oguchi 30; Rebs: Oyedeji 8 Asts: Lawal 7

21 August
21:00

Boxscore

Tunisia	68–52	Central African Republic
Scoring by quarter: 14–9, 16–10, 19–16, 19–17
Pts: Mejri 12; Rebs: Ben Romdhane 11; Asts: Hadidane 3		Pts: Kouguere 20; Rebs: Djimrabaye 8 Asts: Zachée 2

23 August
16:00

Boxscore

Central African Republic	60–56	Uganda
Scoring by quarter: 20–16, 8–16, 11–11, 21–13
Pts: Damachoua 14; Rebs: Grebongo 13; Asts: Djimrabaye 2		Pts: Sebirumbi 15; Rebs: Sebirumbi 13; Asts: Enabu 5

23 August
21:00

Boxscore

Nigeria	59–70	Tunisia
Scoring by quarter: 13–22, 17–17, 12–20, 17–11
Pts: Uzoh 13; Rebs: Aminu 8 Asts: Gbinije 3		Pts: Mejri 24; Rebs: Ben Romdhane 8 Asts: Ben Romdhane 8

=== Group B ===
Pos	Team	Pld	W	L	PF	PA	PD	Pts
1	Senegal	3	3	0	238	220	+18	6
2	Angola	3	2	1	225	213	+12	5
3	Mozambique	3	1	2	233	252	−19	4
4	Morocco	3	0	3	220	230	−10	3

First match(es) will be played: 20 August 2015. Source: FIBA
Rules for classification: (1) Tournament points, (2) Head-to-head tournament points, (3) Head-to-head goal average, (4) Overall goal average, (5) Drawing of lots

20 August
16:00

Boxscore

Angola	84–72	Mozambique
Scoring by quarter: 15–24, 17–19, 29–14, 23–15
Pts: C.Morais 18; Rebs: Moreira 8 Asts: B.Morais 4		Pts: A.Matos 25; Rebs: Magoliço 7 Asts: P.Matos 5

20 August
21:00

Boxscore

Senegal	77–71	Morocco
Scoring by quarter: 17–10, 17–24, 24–17, 19–20
Pts: Dieng 26; Rebs: Dieng 15; Asts: D'Almeida 5		Pts: Zouita 27; Rebs: Kourodu7; Asts: Khalfi 8

22 August
16:00

Boxscore

Mozambique	76–86	Senegal
Scoring by quarter: 16–27, 17–16, 24–21, 19–22
Pts: Matos 18; Rebs: Muchate 5 Asts: Matos 5		Pts: Dieng 28; Rebs: Dieng 18; Asts: D'Almeida 8

22 August
21:00

Boxscore

Angola	68–67	Morocco
Scoring by quarter: 15–23, 18–12, 17–20, 18–12
Pts: Ndoniema 11; Rebs: Mingas 6 Asts: Mingas 1		Pts: Najah 14; Rebs: Najah 6 Asts: Khalfi 4

24 August
16:00

Boxscore

Morocco	82–85	Mozambique
Scoring by quarter: 29–19, 21–23, 10–16, 22–27
Pts: Kourodu 21; Rebs: Kourodu 11; Asts: Zouita 5		Pts: Matos 23; Rebs: Muchate 7 Asts: Canivete 2

24 August
21:00

Boxscore

Senegal	74–73	Angola
Scoring by quarter: 14–18, 23–15, 13–26, 24–14
Pts: Dieng 24; Rebs: Dieng 9 Asts: D'Almeida 8		Pts: C.Morais 19; Rebs: Moreira 7 Asts: C.Morais 5

=== Group C ===
Pos	Team	Pld	W	L	PF	PA	PD	Pts
1	Egypt	3	3	0	234	175	+59	6
2	Cameroon	3	2	1	240	206	+34	5
3	Mali	3	1	2	183	179	+4	4
4	Gabon	3	0	3	170	267	−97	3

First match(es) will be played: 19 August 2015. Source: FIBA
Rules for classification: (1) Tournament points, (2) Head-to-head tournament points, (3) Head-to-head goal average, (4) Overall goal average, (5) Drawing of lots

19 August
12:30

Boxscore

Egypt	96–49	Gabon
Scoring by quarter: 16–15, 39–3, 24–17, 17–14
Pts: El-Gammal 14; Rebs: Shousha 9 Asts: Amin 4		Pts: Lasme 9 Rebs: Lasme 11; Asts: Essono Mvé 3

19 August
17:30

Boxscore

Mali	56–70	Cameroon
Scoring by quarter: 18–11, 10–14, 20–28, 8–17
Pts: Saounera 11; Rebs: Cissé 7 Asts: Cissé 2		Pts: Kadji 17; Rebs: Adala-Moto 6 Asts: Curti 3

21 August
13:30

Boxscore

Gabon	54–78	Mali
Scoring by quarter: 20–16, 8–26, 5–18, 21–18
Pts: Essono Mvé 11; Rebs: Essono Mvé 9 Asts: Lasme 2		Pts: Moungoro 13; Rebs: Bah 9 Asts: Kante 5

21 August
18:30

Boxscore

Egypt	83–77	Cameroon
Scoring by quarter: 22–14, 19–27, 25–21, 17–15
Pts: Khalifa 15; Rebs: Shousha 12; Asts: Khalifa 4		Pts: Nzeulie 19; Rebs: Kadji 10; Asts: Adala Moto 2

23 August
13:30

Boxscore

Cameroon	93–67	Gabon
Scoring by quarter: 15–10, 20–20, 23–22, 35–15
Pts: Nzeulie 25; Rebs: Wangmene 7 Asts: Adala Moto 6		Pts: Kobangoye Ikinda 18; Rebs: Mayimba 7 Asts: Mouckaga Atsu, Ndong 2

23 August
18:30

Boxscore

Mali	49–55	Egypt
Scoring by quarter: 10–17, 10–11, 11–10, 18–17
Pts: Cissé 10; Rebs: Tangara 5 Asts: Kante 3		Pts: Gunady 12; Rebs: Marei 11; Asts: Khalifa 3

=== Group D ===
Pos	Team	Pld	W	L	PF	PA	PD	Pts
1	Cape Verde	3	3	0	230	190	+40	6
2	Ivory Coast	3	2	1	201	202	−1	5
3	Algeria	3	1	2	230	226	+4	4
4	Zimbabwe	3	0	3	184	227	−43	3

First match(es) will be played: 20 August 2015. Source: FIBA
Rules for classification: (1) Tournament points, (2) Head-to-head tournament points, (3) Head-to-head goal average, (4) Overall goal average, (5) Drawing of lots

20 August
13:30

Boxscore

Ivory Coast	56–76	Cape Verde
Scoring by quarter: 11–24, 11–23, 17–17, 17–12
Pts: Diabate 12; Rebs: Koffi 10; Asts: Koffi 4		Pts: Xavier 19; Rebs: Mascarenhas 14; Asts: Xavier 4

20 August
18:30

Boxscore

Algeria	87–67	Zimbabwe
Scoring by quarter: 15–20, 24–17, 27–17, 21–13
Pts: Harat 21; Rebs: Harat 12; Asts: Benzegala 6		Pts: Maturure 14; Rebs: Maturure 10; Asts: Banda 2

22 August
13:30

Boxscore

Ivory Coast	64–52	Zimbabwe
Scoring by quarter: 14–11, 18–11, 16–19, 16–11
Pts: Diabate 17; Rebs: Tape 10; Asts: Diabate 8		Pts: Chikoko 17; Rebs: Chikoko 10; Asts: Maturure 3

22 August
18:30

Boxscore

Cape Verde	78–69	Algeria
Scoring by quarter: 20–19, 30–12, 15–17, 13–21
Pts: Almeida 25; Rebs: Mascarenhas 9 Asts: Xavier 4		Pts: Cheriet 19; Rebs: Gaham 8 Asts: Benzegala 5

24 August
13:30

Boxscore

Zimbabwe	65–76	Cape Verde
Scoring by quarter: 18–22, 18–16, 16–24, 13–14
Pts: Banda 12; Rebs: Chikoko 11; Asts: Maturure 4		Pts: Correia 18; Rebs: Coronel 12; Asts: Almeida 7

24 August
18:30

Boxscore

Algeria	74–81	Ivory Coast
Scoring by quarter: 24–19, 18–18, 18–16, 14–28
Pts: Harat 27; Rebs: Harat 14; Asts: Benzegala 4		Pts: Diabate 26; Rebs: Tape 6 Asts: Diabate 6

== Final round ==
Round of 16
25 August
Tunisia (OT)	69
Morocco	68
25 August
Ivory Coast	57
Mali	76
25 August
Egypt	102
Zimbabwe	62
25 August
Angola	62
Central African Republic	61
26 August
Senegal	79
Uganda	48
26 August
Cameroon	71
Algeria	73
26 August
Cape Verde	67
Gabon	77
26 August
Nigeria	83
Mozambique	47

Quarter-finals
27 August
Tunisia	67
Mali	60
27 August
Egypt	63
Angola	83
27 August
Senegal	75
Algeria	58
27 August
Gabon	64
Nigeria	88

Semi-finals
29 August
Tunisia	51
Angola	58
29 August
Senegal	79
Nigeria (OT)	88

Final
30 August
Angola	65
Nigeria	74
Third place
30 August
Tunisia	82
Senegal	73

5th–8th place
28 August
Mali	51
Egypt	74
28 August
Algeria	84
Gabon	76

5th place
29 August
Egypt	69
Algeria	63
7th place
29 August
Mali	94
Gabon	82

=== Round of 16 ===
25 August
21:00

Boxscore

Tunisia	69–68 (OT)	Morocco
Scoring by quarter: 17–12, 14–11, 16–24, 9–9, Overtime: 13–12
Pts: Ben Romdhane 22; Rebs: Ben Romdhane 10; Asts: Roll 3		Pts: Kourodu 19; Rebs: Zouita 7 Asts: Zouita 6

Salle Omnisport de Rades, Tunis

25 August
18:30

Boxscore

Ivory Coast	57–76	Mali
Scoring by quarter: 6–22, 10–22, 17–13, 24–19
Pts: Diabate 18; Rebs: Seydou Hima 7 Asts: Diabate 4		Pts: Sidibe 18; Rebs: Ballo 10; Asts: Kante 4

Salle Omnisport de Rades, Tunis

25 August
13:30

Boxscore

Egypt	102–62	Zimbabwe
Scoring by quarter: 23–12, 26–17, 22–11, 31–22
Pts: Amin 18; Rebs: Marei 8 Asts: Tawfik 6		Pts: Chikoko 17; Rebs: Chikoko 10; Asts: Chitsinde 2

Salle Omnisport de Rades, Tunis

25 August
16:00

Boxscore

Angola	62–61	Central African Republic
Scoring by quarter: 15–18, 15–11, 22–21, 10–11
Pts: Moreira 16; Rebs: Mingas 8 Asts: Costa 6		Pts: Kouguere 23; Rebs: Kouguere 7 Asts: Damachoua 2

Salle Omnisport de Rades, Tunis

26 August
13:30

Boxscore

Senegal	79–48	Uganda
Scoring by quarter: 16–13, 20–9, 23–16, 20–10
Pts: Dieng 23; Rebs: Dieng 17; Asts: D'Almeida 8		Pts: Ocitti 16; Rebs: Sebirumbi 12; Asts: Mukooza 3

Salle Omnisport de Rades, Tunis

26 August
21:00

Boxscore

Cameroon	71–73	Algeria
Scoring by quarter: 19–19, 15–15, 21–21, 16–18
Pts: Tchoubaye 22; Rebs: Adala Moto 10; Asts: Bitee 3		Pts: Harat 23; Rebs: Mekdad 7 Asts: Benzegala 8

Salle Omnisport de Rades, Tunis

26 August
16:00

Boxscore

Cape Verde	67–77	Gabon
Scoring by quarter: 24–20, 17–19, 17–16, 9–22
Pts: Correia 23; Rebs: Almeida 10; Asts: Xavier 7		Pts: Mayimba 17; Rebs: Essono Mve 10; Asts: Kobangoye Ikinda 4

Salle Omnisport de Rades, Tunis

26 August
18:30

Boxscore

Nigeria	83–47	Mozambique
Scoring by quarter: 29–16, 12–8, 20–12, 22–11
Pts: Aminu 14; Rebs: Lawal 12; Asts: Umeh 4		Pts: Matos 14; Rebs: Martins 4 Asts: Matos 4

Salle Omnisport de Rades, Tunis

=== Quarterfinals ===
27 August
13:30

Boxscore

Gabon	64–88	Nigeria
Scoring by quarter: 11–23, 14–26, 9–23, 30–16
Pts: Mayimba 21; Rebs: Lasme 9 Asts: Boundou 3		Pts: Aminu 17; Rebs: Aminu 10; Asts: Uzoh 6

Salle Omnisport de Rades, Tunis

27 August
16:00

Boxscore

Egypt	63–83	Angola
Scoring by quarter: 13–20, 16–23, 17–17, 17–23
Pts: Amin 19; Rebs: Khalifa 8 Asts: Khalifa 4		Pts: C. Morais 19; Rebs: Ambrosio 5 Asts: Costa 6

Salle Omnisport de Rades, Tunis

27 August
18:30

Boxscore

Senegal	75–58	Algeria
Scoring by quarter: 17–12, 20–16, 25–9, 13–21
Pts: Dieng 20; Rebs: Dieng 17; Asts: Dieng 8		Pts: Harat, Mounir Benzegala 12; Rebs: Touati 7 Asts: four players 1

Salle Omnisport de Rades, Tunis

27 August
21:00

Boxscore

Tunisia	67–60	Mali
Scoring by quarter: 18–4, 15–20, 13–11, 21–25
Pts: El Mabrouk 16; Rebs: Ben Romdhane 7 Asts: Abada 5		Pts: Cissé 14; Rebs: Djambo 8 Asts: Kante 3

Salle Omnisport de Rades, Tunis

=== 5th–8th-place semifinals ===
28 August
15:00

Boxscore

Mali	51–74	Egypt
Scoring by quarter: 13–18, 10–8, 7–18, 21–30
Pts: Moungoro 14; Rebs: Kante 6 Asts: Cisse 1		Pts: Elgammal 9 Rebs: Khalifa 10; Asts: Marei 4

Salle Omnisport de Rades, Tunis

28 August
17:00

Boxscore

Algeria	84–76	Gabon
Scoring by quarter: 28–13, 22–18, 15–23, 19–22
Pts: Harat 23; Rebs: Dekkiche 6 Asts: Ammour 3		Pts: Mayimba 18; Rebs: Lasme 8 Asts: Kobangoye Ikinda 2

Salle Omnisport de Rades, Tunis

=== Semifinals ===
29 August
18:30

Boxscore

Senegal	79–88 (OT)	Nigeria
Scoring by quarter: 15–18, 22–17, 26–22, 13–19, Overtime: 3–12
Pts: Dieng 20; Rebs: Dieng 16; Asts: Dalmeida 11		Pts: Oguchi 28; Rebs: Lawal 11; Asts: Aminu 4

Salle Omnisport de Rades, Tunis

29 August
21:00

Boxscore

Tunisia	51–58	Angola
Scoring by quarter: 9–15, 6–9, 17–17, 19–17
Pts: Ben Romdhane 12; Rebs: Mejri 9 Asts: Abada 4		Pts: Mingas 14; Rebs: Costa 8 Asts: Morais 3

Salle Omnisport de Rades, Tunis

=== Fifteenth-place match ===
27 August
11:00

Boxscore

Zimbabwe	64–72	Uganda
Scoring by quarter: 17–20, 12–16, 11–14, 24–22
Pts: Maturure 20; Rebs: Chitsinde 8 Asts: Chitsinde 3		Pts: Ocitti 27; Rebs: Ocitti 8 Asts: Mukooza 7

Salle Omnisport de Rades, Tunis

=== Thirteenth-place match ===
28 August
9:00

Boxscore

Central African Republic	74–86	Morocco
Scoring by quarter: 20–17, 16–15, 20–28, 18–26
Pts: Kouguere 22; Rebs: Djimrabaye 7 Asts: Damachoua 4		Pts: Kourodu 21; Rebs: Zouita 7 Asts: Khalfi 9

Salle Omnisport de Rades, Tunis

=== Eleventh-place match ===
28 August
11:00

Boxscore

Ivory Coast	63–70	Mozambique
Scoring by quarter: 18–22, 10–6, 15–23, 20–19
Pts: Diabate 19; Rebs: Meite 7 Asts: Diabate 8		Pts: A. Matos 21; Rebs: Ubisse 10; Asts: P. Matos 4

Salle Omnisport de Rades, Tunis

=== Ninth-place match ===
28 August
13:00

Boxscore

Cape Verde	66–88	Cameroon
Scoring by quarter: 30–16, 8–25, 24–19, 9–23
Pts: Xavier 19; Rebs: Almeida 11; Asts: Almeida 8		Pts: Moundou Missi 16; Rebs: Adala Moto 8 Asts: Bitee 3

Salle Omnisport de Rades, Tunis

=== Seventh-place match ===
29 August
13:30

Boxscore

Mali	94–82	Gabon
Scoring by quarter: 35–31, 23–21, 14–17, 22–13
Pts: Tangara 20; Rebs: Tangara 17; Asts: Kante 8		Pts: Mayimba 18; Rebs: Mayimba 9 Asts: Essono Mvé 6

Salle Omnisport de Rades, Tunis

=== Fifth-place match ===
29 August
16:00

Boxscore

Egypt	69–63	Algeria
Scoring by quarter: 13–13, 14–17, 19–14, 23–19
Pts: Marei 17; Rebs: Marei 11; Asts: Khalifa 4		Pts: Touati 15; Rebs: Touati 10; Asts: Mostefat 4

Salle Omnisport de Rades, Tunis

=== Third-place match ===
30 August
18:30

Boxscore

Tunisia	82–73	Senegal
Scoring by quarter: 23–18, 14–15, 23–19, 22–21
Pts: Roll 25; Rebs: Braa 9 Asts: Roll 5		Pts: Mendy 19; Rebs: Dieng 12; Asts: Dalmeida 9

Salle Omnisport de Rades, Tunis

=== Final ===
30 August
21:00

Boxscore

Angola	65–74	Nigeria
Scoring by quarter: 13–10, 11–27, 12–14, 29–23
Pts: Morais 15; Rebs: Mingas 8 Asts: Costa 4		Pts: Oguchi 19; Rebs: Aminu 12; Asts: Uzoh 3

Salle Omnisport de Rades, Tunis

== Final rankings ==
Qualified for the 2016 Olympics
Qualified to Final Olympic qualifying tournament

Rank	Team	Record	FIBA World Rankings		
Rank	Team	Record	Before	After	Change
1st place, gold medalist(s)	Nigeria	6–1	24	25	-1
2nd place, silver medalist(s)	Angola	5–2	16	15	1
3rd place, bronze medalist(s)	Tunisia	6–1	23	23	0
4	Senegal	5–2	30	31	-1
5	Egypt	6–1	41	41	0
6	Algeria	3–4	80	68	12
7	Mali	3–4	T-62	T-57	5
8	Gabon	1–6	NR	76	12
9	Cameroon	3–2	43	52	-9
10	Cape Verde	3–2	55	63	-8
11	Mozambique	2–3	T-66	T-61	5
12	Ivory Coast	2–3	37	40	-3
13	Morocco	1–4	60	60	0
14	Central African Republic	1–4	T-56	T-57	-1
15	Uganda	1–4	NR	T-89	-1
16	Zimbabwe	0–5	NR	T-91	-3

== Rewards ==
2015 FIBA Africa Championship winners

Nigeria
First title

Most Valuable Player
(Nigeria) Chamberlain Oguchi

=== All Tournament Team ===
- (Nigeria) Chamberlain Oguchi (MVP)
- (Nigeria) Al-Farouq Aminu
- (Angola) Carlos Morais
- (Tunisia) Makram Ben Romdhane
- (Senegal) Gorgui Dieng

== Partners and sponsors ==
- Presenting Partner: (Tunisia) Ooredoo
- Global Partners: (United States) Champion, (France) Intersport, (Japan) Molten Corporation, (China) Peak Sport Products, (Switzerland) Tissot
- Event Sponsors: (Tunisia) AMI assurance, (Tunisia) Sabrine, (Tunisia) SAÏDA Group, (Spain) SEAT
