= Aubin-Thierry Goporo =

Central African-American basketball player

Tennessee Volunteers
- Position: Director of Student-Athlete Development
- League: SEC

Personal information
- Born: 15 May 1968 (age 58) Bangui, Central African Republic
- Listed height: 6 ft 1 in (1.85 m)
- Listed weight: 172 lb (78 kg)

Career information
- College: Florida Tech (1992–1996)
- NBA draft: 1996: undrafted

Aubin-Thierry Goporo (born 15 May 1968) is a Central African basketball coach and former player who is the Director of Student-Athlete Development for the Tennessee Volunteers basketball team. He played college basketball for the Florida Tech Panthers and graduated in 1996. Goporo competed at the 1988 Summer Olympics with the Central African Republic national basketball team and became the coach of the team for the FIBA Africa Championships in 2015. He is the former head basketball coach and athletic director at Florida Air Academy in Melbourne, Florida. He amassed a 309–47 record and won 5 state championships in 15 seasons.

He is the younger brother of fellow basketball player and coach Frédéricque Rufin Goporo.
