= Basketball at the 2011 All-Africa Games =

- League: All Africa Games
- Sport: Basketball
- Duration: September 9 – 17, 2011 (M); September 2 – 12, 2011 (W)
- Teams: 10 / 12
- Medallists: Nigeria (M); Mozambique; Angola; Senegal (W); Angola; Nigeria

All-Africa Games Basketball seasons
- ← 2007 2015 →

The Basketball tournament at the 2011 All-Africa Games was held from September 6–16, 2011, at several venues.

== Competition format ==
The teams with the four best records qualified for the knockout stage, which was a single-elimination tournament. The semifinal winners contested for the gold medal, while the losers played for the bronze medal.

=== Calendar ===
P	Preliminaries	¼	Quarterfinals	½	Semifinals	F	Final

Event↓/Date →	Fri 2 Sep	Sun 4 Sep	Mon 5 Sep	Tue 6 Sep	Wed 7 Sep	Fri 9 Sep	Sat 10 Sep	Sun 11 Sep	Mon 12 Sep	Tue 13 Sep	Thu 15 Sep	Fri 16 Sep	Sat 17 Sep
Men						P	P	P	P	P	¼	½	F
Women	P	P	P	P	P		¼	½	F				

=== Men's competition ===
Group A	Group B
Algeria; Mali; Mozambique; Nigeria; Rwanda	Angola; Cape Verde; Egypt; Ivory Coast; South Africa

=== Women's competition ===
Group A	Group B
Algeria; DR Congo; Kenya; Nigeria; Mozambique; Zimbabwe	Angola; Cameroon; Ivory Coast; Mali; Rwanda; Senegal

== Medal summary ==
=== Medal table ===
Rank	Nation	Gold	Silver	Bronze	Total
1	Nigeria (NGR)	1	0	1	2
2	Senegal (SEN)	1	0	0	1
3	Angola (ANG)	0	1	1	2
4	Mozambique (MOZ)	0	1	0	1
Totals (4 entries)		2	2	2	6

=== Events ===
Event	Gold	Silver	Bronze
Men	Nigeria Abdullahi Kuso; Abubakar Usman; Azuoma Dike; Ejike Ugboaja; Emmanuel Ekpete; Ibrahim Yusuf; Jayson Obazuaye; Orseer Ikyaator; Olumide Oyedeji; Solomon Tat; Stanley Gumut; Coach: Sani Ahmed	Mozambique Amarildo Matos; Armando Baptista; Augusto Matos; Custódio Muchate; David Canivete; Fernando Mandlate; Octávio Magoliço; Pio Matos; Samora Mucavel; Sérgio Macuácua; Stélio Nuaila; Sílvio Letela; Coach: Iñaki Garcia	Angola Abdel Gomes; Adolfo Quimbamba; Bráulio Morais; Felizardo Ambrósio; Hélder Ortet; Hermenegildo Santos; Islando Manuel; Mayzer Alexandre; Miguel Kiala; Paulo Santana; Roberto Fortes; Vladimir Ricardino; Coach: Raúl Duarte
Women	Senegal Adji Ndiaye; Aida Fall; Aminata Nar Diop; Astou Traoré; Awa Doumbia; Aya Traoré; Mame Diodio Diouf; Mame-Marie Sy-Diop; Ndeye Fall; Ndèye Ndiaye; Ndèye Sène; Oumoul Sarr; Coach: Moustapha Gaye	Angola Ângela Cardoso; Astrida Vicente; Catarina Camufal; Cristina Matiquite; Felizarda Jorge; Fineza Eusébio; Luísa Tomás; Luzia Simão; Nacissela Maurício; Nadir Manuel; Ngiendula Filipe; Sónia Guadalupe; Coach: Aníbal Moreira	Nigeria Adeola Wylie; Aisha Mohammed; Chinyere Ibekwe; Grace Okonkwo; Helen Ogunjimi; Henrietta Ugochukwu; Joyce Ekworomadu; Nkechi Akashili; Olayinka Sanni; Rashidat Sadiq; Rosalyn Gold-Onwude; Sarah Ogoke; Coach: Ayo Bakare

== Final standings ==
Rank	Men			
Rank	Team	Pld	W	L
1st place, gold medalist(s)	Nigeria	7	6	1
2nd place, silver medalist(s)	Mozambique	7	5	2
3rd place, bronze medalist(s)	Angola	7	6	1
4.	Algeria	7	3	4
Eliminated at the quarterfinals
5.	Egypt	7	4	3
6.	Cape Verde	7	4	3
7.	Rwanda	7	2	5
8.	Ivory Coast	7	1	6
Preliminary round 5th placers
9.	Mali	5	2	3
10.	South Africa	5	0	5

Rank	Women			
Rank	Team	Pld	W	L
1st place, gold medalist(s)	Senegal	8	7	1
2nd place, silver medalist(s)	Angola	8	7	1
3rd place, bronze medalist(s)	Nigeria	8	6	2
4.	Mozambique	8	6	2
Eliminated at the quarterfinals
5.	Ivory Coast	8	4	4
6.	Kenya	8	3	5
7.	Rwanda	8	3	5
8.	Algeria	8	2	6
Preliminary round 5th placers
9.	Cameroon	7	2	5
10.	DR Congo	7	2	5
Preliminary round 6th placers
11.	Zimbabwe	7	2	5
12.	Mali	7	2	5
