= Basketball at the 2011 All-Africa Games – Men's team rosters =

This article displays the rosters for the participating teams at the 2011 All-Africa Games (men's basketball tournament).

== Algeria ==
Algeria national basketball team – 2011 All-Africa Games – 4th place roster
Players
Coaches

Pos.	No.	Name	Age – Date of birth	Height	Club	Ctr.
SG		Abdesslem Dekkiche	25 – 27 February 1986	1.94 m (6 ft 4 in)	GS Pétroliers	(Algeria)
		Djillali Canon	32 – 30 September 1978		GS Pétroliers	(Algeria)
		Fayçal Belkhodja	23 – 3 February 1988		GS Pétroliers	(Algeria)
PG		Abdelhalim Kaouane	29 – 29 November 1981	1.80 m (5 ft 11 in)
		Mohamed Craïdi	–
SF		Mohamed Harat	21 – 9 June 1990	1.98 m (6 ft 6 in)	GS Pétroliers	(Algeria)
		Mounir Benzegala	24 – 7 April 1987
PF		Nabil Saïdi	31 – 13 March 1980	2.04 m (6 ft 8 in)	GS Pétroliers	(Algeria)
PG		Fethi Oukerimi	31 – 15 August 1980	1.85 m (6 ft 1 in)	TBB Blida	(Algeria)
		Rabah Zitoun	100 – 1 January 1911		USMM Hadjout	(Algeria)
		Touhami Ghezzoul	24 – 5 January 1987
		Yanis Mostefai	100 – 1 January 1911		NB Staoueli	(Algeria)

Head coach

- (United States) Sean Whalen

Assistant coach

- (United States) Patrick Fitzpatrick

Legend

- (C) Team captain
- Club field describes current club

== Angola ==
Angola national basketball team – 2011 All-Africa Games – Bronze Medal roster
Players
Coaches

Pos.	No.	Name	Age – Date of birth	Height	Club	Ctr.
C		Abdel Gomes	22 – 21 May 1989	2.03 m (6 ft 8 in)
PF		Adolfo Quimbamba	28 – 28 December 1982	1.97 m (6 ft 6 in)
PG		Bráulio Morais	20 – 17 December 1990	1.90 m (6 ft 3 in)	Petro Atlético	(Angola)
C		Felizardo Ambrósio	23 – 25 December 1987	2.02 m (6 ft 8 in)	Primeiro de Agosto	(Angola)
C		Hélder Ortet	29 – 1 January 1982	2.01 m (6 ft 7 in)
PG		Hermenegildo Santos	21 – 16 August 1990	1.88 m (6 ft 2 in)	Primeiro de Agosto	(Angola)
PF		Islando Manuel	20 – 1 January 1991	1.92 m (6 ft 4 in)	Primeiro de Agosto	(Angola)
F		Mayzer Alexandre	27 – 29 June 1984	1.84 m (6 ft 0 in)	Recreativo do Libolo	(Angola)
C		Miguel Kiala	20 – 10 November 1990	2.04 m (6 ft 8 in)	Petro Atlético	(Angola)
PG		Paulo Santana	27 – 28 April 1984	1.85 m (6 ft 1 in)	Petro Atlético	(Angola)
SF		Roberto Fortes	26 – 9 November 1984	1.93 m (6 ft 4 in)	Petro Atlético	(Angola)
PF		Vladimir Ricardino	32 – 4 October 1978	1.98 m (6 ft 6 in)	Recreativo do Libolo	(Angola)

Head coach

- (Angola) Raúl Duarte

Assistant coach

Legend

- (C) Team captain
- Club field describes current club

== Cape Verde ==
Cape Verde national basketball team – 2011 All-Africa Games – 6th place roster
Players
Coaches

Pos.	No.	Name	Age – Date of birth	Height	Club	Ctr.
PG	4	Braima Freire	29 – 19 January 1982	1.84 m (6 ft 0 in)
	5	Petey Cipriano	28 – 7 February 1983	2.06 m (6 ft 9 in)
	6	Ivan Almeida	22 – 10 May 1989	1.97 m (6 ft 6 in)
	7	Fidel Mendonça	27 – 7 July 1984
SG	8	Mário Correia	33 – 17 March 1978	1.90 m (6 ft 3 in)
	9	Joel Almeida	25 – 11 October 1985
	10	Sekouba Conde	21 – 31 December 1989
SF	11	Flávio Gomes	22 – 26 December 1988	1.95 m (6 ft 5 in)
C	12	Walter Tavares	19 – 22 March 1992	2.20 m (7 ft 3 in)
	13	Abdulay Faty	26 – 14 January 1985	2.05 m (6 ft 9 in)
PG	14	Brian Rudolph	23 – 17 September 1988	1.80 m (5 ft 11 in)
SF	15	Rodrigo Mascarenhas	31 – 24 March 1980	1.98 m (6 ft 6 in)

Head coach

- (Nigeria) Alex Nwora

Assistant coach

Legend

- (C) Team captain
- Club field describes current club

== Egypt ==
Egypt national basketball team – 2011 All-Africa Games – 5th place roster
Players
Coaches

Pos.	No.	Name	Age – Date of birth	Height	Club	Ctr.
PG	4	Mouhanad El Sabagh	23 – 23 April 1988	1.81 m (5 ft 11 in)
	5	Amr Gendy	20 – 14 June 1991
	6	Ahmed Baraka	22 – 9 February 1989
PF	7	Assem Marei	19 – 16 June 1992	2.06 m (6 ft 9 in)
PG	8	Tamer Shahin	29 – 5 July 1982	1.87 m (6 ft 2 in)
SF	9	Ibrahim El-Gammal	23 – 23 March 1988	1.89 m (6 ft 2 in)
PG	10	Motaz Okasha	21 – 14 February 1990	1.86 m (6 ft 1 in)
C	11	Mohamed Rashed	24 – 17 June 1987	2.10 m (6 ft 11 in)
PF	12	Mark Aziz	25 – 21 March 1986	2.02 m (6 ft 8 in)
SF	13	Ahmed El-Sabagh	26 – 26 May 1985	1.90 m (6 ft 3 in)
PF	14	Mohamed El-Kerdany	34 – 24 April 1977	1.95 m (6 ft 5 in)
C	15	Rami Ibrahim	23 – 6 February 1988	2.05 m (6 ft 9 in)

Head coach

Assistant coach

Legend

- (C) Team captain
- Club field describes current club

== Ivory Coast ==
Ivory Coast national basketball team – 2011 All-Africa Games – 8th place roster
Players
Coaches

Pos.	No.	Name	Age – Date of birth	Height	Club	Ctr.
G	4	Alassane Meite	19 – 21 September 1991	1.84 m (6 ft 0 in)
G	5	Pierre Gbotto	27 – 18 August 1984	1.83 m (6 ft 0 in)
F	6	Daouda Camara	20 – 29 December 1990	1.92 m (6 ft 4 in)
C	7	Mohamed Koné	30 – 24 March 1981	2.11 m (6 ft 11 in)
	8	Amara Kamate	30 – 14 September 1981
F	9	Eric Affi	29 – 1 January 1982	1.96 m (6 ft 5 in)
	10	Kouamé Kouadio	25 – 24 July 1986
	11	Moriba Bamba	28 – 27 December 1982
	12	Asshe Kokoun	25 – 28 December 1985
	13	Gomon Agole	27 – 26 February 1984
	14	Alpha Ouattara	30 – 26 March 1981
	15	Moussa Cissé	29 – 30 October 1981

Head coach

- Lemou Benga

Assistant coach

- Olivier Tea

Legend

- (C) Team captain
- Club field describes current club

== Mali ==
Mali national basketball team – 2011 All-Africa Games – 9th place roster
Players
Coaches

Pos.	No.	Name	Age – Date of birth	Height	Club	Ctr.
SF	4	Amadou Kaba	100 – 1 January 1911	1.90 m (6 ft 3 in)
PG	5	Abdrahamane Maïga	100 – 1 January 1911	1.78 m (5 ft 10 in)
PG	6	Salif Niangado	30 – 13 September 1981	1.82 m (6 ft 0 in)
	7	Aïchatou Sangare	30 – 31 May 1981
	8	Yacouba Traore	22 – 22 March 1989
	9	Namory Diarra	30 – 22 March 1981
	10	Ba Sekou Diallo	25 – 29 August 1986
	11	Soumaila Samake	33 – 18 March 1978
SF	12	Ibrahima Haidara	18 – 9 October 1992	2.02 m (6 ft 8 in)
	13	Ibrahima Dembele	23 – 25 March 1988
C	14	Mohamed Tangara	27 – 11 August 1984	2.09 m (6 ft 10 in)
	15	Mamadou Diarra	25 – 29 August 1986

Head coach

Assistant coach

Legend

- (C) Team captain
- Club field describes current club

== Mozambique ==
Mozambique national basketball team – 2011 All-Africa Games – Silver Medal roster
Players
Coaches

Pos.	No.	Name	Age – Date of birth	Height	Club	Ctr.
SF	4	Fernando Mandlate	26 – 11 August 1985	1.90 m (6 ft 3 in)	Maxaquene
PG	5	Samora Mucavel	25 – 9 September 1986	1.85 m (6 ft 1 in)	Maxaquene
PG	6	David Canivete	22 – 9 August 1989	1.90 m (6 ft 3 in)	Desportivo de Maputo
PG	7	Sílvio Letela	28 – 6 December 1982	1.90 m (6 ft 3 in)	Maxaquene
SG	8	Augusto Matos	20 – 29 November 1990	1.85 m (6 ft 1 in)	Desportivo de Maputo
PG	9	Amarildo Matos	26 – 12 March 1985	1.90 m (6 ft 3 in)	Desportivo de Maputo
PF	10	Stélio Nuaila	26 – 24 April 1985	1.95 m (6 ft 5 in)	Maxaquene
C	11	Custódio Muchate	29 – 6 May 1982	1.98 m (6 ft 6 in)	Ferroviário Beira
C	12	Octávio Magoliço	26 – 4 October 1984	2.00 m (6 ft 7 in)	Ferroviário Beira
C	13	Armando Baptista	26 – 2 June 1985	2.00 m (6 ft 7 in)	Ferroviário Beira
C	14	Sérgio Macuácua	30 – 2 October 1980	1.98 m (6 ft 6 in)	Ferroviário Beira
PG	15	Pio Matos	20 – 29 November 1990	1.85 m (6 ft 1 in)	Desportivo de Maputo

Head coach

- (Spain) Iñaki Garcia

Assistant coach

- (Mozambique) Milagre Macome

Legend

- (C) Team captain
- Club field describes current club

== Nigeria ==
Nigeria national basketball team – 2011 All-Africa Games – Gold Medal roster
Players
Coaches

Pos.	No.	Name	Age – Date of birth	Height	Club	Ctr.
SG	4	Solomon Tat	25 – 29 July 1986	1.96 m (6 ft 5 in)
PG	5	Azuoma Dike	21 – 7 December 1989	1.88 m (6 ft 2 in)
SG	6	Ibrahim Yusuf	22 – 4 May 1989	1.96 m (6 ft 5 in)
G	7	Abubakar Usman	25 – 5 July 1986	1.90 m (6 ft 3 in)
	8	Mathew Onmonya	24 – 29 November 1986
SF	9	Orseer Ikyaator	22 – 9 September 1989
PG	10	Jayson Obazuaye	27 – 27 July 1984	1.90 m (6 ft 3 in)
	11	Abdullahi Kuso	29 – 17 February 1982
F	12	Ejike Ugboaja	26 – 28 May 1985	2.03 m (6 ft 8 in)
G	13	Stanley Gumut	25 – 21 February 1986	1.97 m (6 ft 6 in)
	14	Emmanuel Ekpete	29 – 10 January 1982
C	15	Olumide Oyedeji	30 – 11 May 1981	2.08 m (6 ft 10 in)

Head coach

- (Nigeria) Sani Ahmed

Assistant coach

Legend

- (C) Team captain
- Club field describes current club

== Rwanda ==
Rwanda national basketball team – 2011 All-Africa Games – 7th place roster
Players
Coaches

Pos.	No.	Name	Age – Date of birth	Height	Club	Ctr.
PG	4	Aboubakar Barame	27 – 26 April 1984	1.80 m (5 ft 11 in)	APR	(Rwanda)
PG	5	Aristide Mugabe	23 – 11 February 1988	1.83 m (6 ft 0 in)	CSK	(Rwanda)
SF	6	Jean-Louis Habineza	27 – 6 December 1983	1.92 m (6 ft 4 in)	Espoir Kigali	(Rwanda)
SF	7	Cameroun Bradley	20 – 27 February 1991	1.96 m (6 ft 5 in)
	8	Aimé Nkusi	27 – 12 December 1983		Galaxy Falcons	(Uganda)
PF	9	Olivier Muhizi	100 – 1 January 1911	1.98 m (6 ft 6 in)	N.U.R.	(Rwanda)
G	10	Hamza Ruhezamihigo	26 – 27 March 1985	1.95 m (6 ft 5 in)	Concordia Univ.	(Canada)
	11	Darrius Brannon	28 – 9 March 1983		Houston Blaze	(United States)
SF	12	Kenny Gasana	26 – 9 November 1984	1.97 m (6 ft 6 in)	NH Ostrava	(Czech Republic)
C	13	Kami Kabangu	27 – 2 July 1984	2.03 m (6 ft 8 in)	APR	(Rwanda)
	14	Fiston Muhire	20 – 8 July 1991
F	15	Daniel Rugamba	24 – 16 March 1987	1.95 m (6 ft 5 in)

Head coach

- (Croatia) Većeslav Kavedžija

Assistant coach

Legend

- (C) Team captain
- Club field describes current club

== South Africa ==
South Africa national basketball team – 2011 All-Africa Games – 10th place roster
Players
Coaches

Pos.	No.	Name	Age – Date of birth	Height	Club	Ctr.
	4	Quintin Denyssen	31 – 27 August 1980	2.00 m (6 ft 7 in)
	5	Jerry Manyubele	–
	6	Celumusa Khumalo	23 – 8 September 1988
PG	7	Lebesa Selepe	20 – 13 March 1991	1.90 m (6 ft 3 in)
C	8	Cedrick Kalombo	28 – 2 June 1983	2.08 m (6 ft 10 in)
SF	9	Thabang Kgwedi	33 – 15 April 1978	1.98 m (6 ft 6 in)
G	10	Brendan Mettler	29 – 10 January 1982	1.89 m (6 ft 2 in)
	11	Lindokuhle Sibankulu	30 – 9 April 1981	1.99 m (6 ft 6 in)
	12	Neo Mothiba	29 – 21 March 1982	2.00 m (6 ft 7 in)
SF	13	Amogelang Keogatile	23 – 10 October 1987	1.95 m (6 ft 5 in)
	14	Kagiso Ngoetjana	21 – 15 November 1989
	15	Wayne Mhlongo	24 – 25 January 1987

Head coach

- (South Africa) Mlungisi Ngwenya

Assistant coach

Legend

- (C) Team captain
- Club field describes current club

== See also ==
- 2011 FIBA Africa Championship for Women squads
