= Basketball at the 2011 All-Africa Games – Women's tournament =

Basketball at the 2011 All-Africa Games women's tournament
Tournament details
- Host country: Mozambique
- Dates: September 2 – 12, 2011
- Teams: 12 (from 12 federations)
- Venues: 2 (in 1 Maputo host cities)

Final positions
- Champions: Senegal (7th title)

Official website
- All Africa Games: Tournament for Women 2011

The 2011 edition of the women's basketball tournament of the African Games was the 10th, organized by FIBA Africa and played under the auspices of FIBA, the basketball sport governing body. The tournament was held from 2 to 12 September 2011 in Maputo, Mozambique, contested by 12 national teams and won by Senegal.

== Draw ==
Group A	Group B
Algeria; DR Congo; Kenya; Nigeria; Mozambique; Zimbabwe	Angola; Cameroon; Ivory Coast; Mali; Rwanda; Senegal

== Preliminary round ==
Times given below are in UTC+2.

=== Group A ===
Qualified for the quarter-finals

Team	Pld	W	L	PF	PA	PD	Pts
Mozambique	5	5	0	316	249	+67	10
Nigeria	5	4	1	297	224	+73	9
Kenya	5	2	3	285	245	+40	7
Zimbabwe	5	2	3	263	281	−18	7
Algeria	5	1	4	235	337	−102	6
DR Congo	5	1	4	244	304	−60	6

2 September 2011
09:00

Algeria	40–48	Nigeria

Pavilhão do Desportivo de Maputo, Maputo

15:30

Kenya	52–55	DR Congo

19:30

Mozambique	73–37	Zimbabwe

4 September 2011
11:00

Kenya	61–36	Algeria

Pavilhão do Desportivo de Maputo, Maputo

13:30

Zimbabwe	45–75	Nigeria

17:30

Mozambique	67–53	DR Congo

5 September 2011
09:00

Zimbabwe	35–63	Kenya

Pavilhão do Desportivo de Maputo, Maputo

13:30

DR Congo	49–55	Algeria

19:30

Mozambique	52–44	Nigeria

6 September 2011
11:00

DR Congo	61–63	Zimbabwe

Pavilhão do Desportivo de Maputo, Maputo

13:30

Nigeria	61–31	Kenya

17:30

Algeria	67–68	Mozambique

7 September 2011
09:00

Algeria	65–55	Zimbabwe

Pavilhão do Desportivo de Maputo, Maputo

15:30

Nigeria	67–26	DR Congo

17:30

Mozambique	56–48	Kenya

=== Group B ===
Qualified for the quarter-finals

Team	Pld	W	L	PF	PA	PD	Pts
Angola	5	5	0	282	189	+93	10
Senegal	5	4	1	337	214	+123	9
Ivory Coast	5	2	3	233	255	-22	7
Rwanda	5	2	3	216	285	-69	7
Mali	5	2	3	236	315	−79	7
Cameroon	5	0	5	255	301	−46	5

2 September 2011
11:00

Ivory Coast	68–28	Mali

Pavilhão do Desportivo de Maputo, Maputo

13:30

Angola	56–52	Senegal

17:30

Rwanda	60–56	Cameroon

4 September 2011
09:00

Rwanda	48–46	Ivory Coast

Pavilhão do Desportivo de Maputo, Maputo

15:30

Senegal	58–54	Cameroon

19:30

Angola	45–38	Mali

5 September 2011
11:00

Angola	53–22	Rwanda

Pavilhão do Desportivo de Maputo, Maputo

15:30

Cameroon	42–49	Ivory Coast

17:30

Senegal	81–43	Mali

6 September 2011
09:00

Mali	62–59	Rwanda

Pavilhão do Desportivo de Maputo, Maputo

15:30

Ivory Coast	36–78	Senegal

19:30

Cameroon	41–69	Angola

7 September 2011
11:00

Mali	65–62	Cameroon

Pavilhão do Desportivo de Maputo, Maputo

13:30

Senegal	68–25	Rwanda

19:30

Ivory Coast	34–59	Angola

== Knockout stage ==
=== Championship bracket ===
Quarter-finals
Mozambique	86
Rwanda	70
Senegal	76
Kenya	44
Nigeria	62
Ivory Coast	45
Angola	85
Algeria	39

Semi-finals
Mozambique	71
Senegal	83
Nigeria	55
Angola	70

Final
Senegal	64
Angola	57
Third place
Mozambique	69
Nigeria	72

==== Quarterfinals ====
10 September 2011
13:30

Angola	85–39	Algeria

Pavilhão do Maxaquene, Maputo

15:30

Nigeria	62–45	Ivory Coast

17:30

Mozambique	86–70	Rwanda

19:30

Senegal	76–44	Kenya

==== Semifinals ====
11 September 2011
17:30

Angola	70–55	Nigeria

Pavilhão do Maxaquene, Maputo

19:30

Senegal	83–71	Mozambique

==== Third place game ====
12 September 2011
17:30

Mozambique	69–72	Nigeria

Pavilhão do Maxaquene, Maputo

==== Final ====
12 September 2011
19:30

Senegal	64–57	Angola

Pavilhão do Maxaquene, Maputo

=== 5–8th place bracket ===
Semifinals
Rwanda	50
Kenya	54
Algeria	58
Ivory Coast	74

Fifth place
Kenya	52
Ivory Coast	55
Seventh place
Rwanda	72
Algeria	59

==== Semifinals ====
11 September 2011
13:30

Kenya	54–50	Rwanda

Pavilhão do Maxaquene, Maputo

15:20

Ivory Coast	74–58	Algeria

==== Seventh place game ====
11 September 2011
13:30

Rwanda	72–59	Algeria

Pavilhão do Maxaquene, Maputo

==== Fifth place game ====
11 September 2011
15:30

Ivory Coast	55–52	Kenya

Pavilhão do Maxaquene, Maputo

=== 9–12th place bracket ===
Semifinals
Mali	58
DR Congo	67
Zimbabwe	50
Cameroon	57

Ninth place
DR Congo	50
Cameroon	59
Eleventh place
Mali	56
Zimbabwe	59

==== Semifinals ====
9 September 2011
09:00

Cameroon	57–50	Zimbabwe

Pavilhão do Maxaquene, Maputo

11:00

DR Congo	67–58	Mali

==== Eleventh place game ====
10 September 2011
09:00

Zimbabwe	59–56	Mali

Pavilhão do Maxaquene, Maputo

==== Ninth place game ====
10 September 2011
11:00

Cameroon	59–50	DR Congo

Pavilhão do Maxaquene, Maputo

== Final standings ==
Rank	Team	Record
Gold medal	Senegal	7–1
Silver medal	Angola	7–1
Bronze medal	Nigeria	6–2
4	Mozambique	6–2
5	Ivory Coast	4–4
6	Kenya	3–5
7	Rwanda	3–5
8	Algeria	2–6
9	Cameroon	2–5
10	DR Congo	2–5
11	Zimbabwe	2–5
12	Mali	2–5

1st	2nd	3rd
Senegal Adji Ndiaye; Aida Fall; Aminata Nar Diop; Astou Traoré; Awa Doumbia; Aya Traore; Mame Diodio Diouf; Mame-Marie Sy-Diop; Ndeye Fall; Ndèye Ndiaye; Ndèye Sène; Oumoul Sarr; Coach: Moustapha Gaye	Angola Ângela Cardoso; Astrida Vicente; Catarina Camufal; Cristina Matiquite; Felizarda Jorge; Fineza Eusébio; Luísa Tomás; Luzia Simão; Nacissela Maurício; Nadir Manuel; Ngiendula Filipe; Sónia Guadalupe; Coach: Aníbal Moreira	Nigeria Adeola Wylie; Aisha Mohammed; Chinyere Ibekwe; Grace Okonkwo; Helen Ogunjimi; Henrietta Ugochukwu; Joyce Ekworomadu; Nkechi Akashili; Olayinka Sanni; Rashidat Sadiq; Rosalyn Gold-Onwude, Sarah Ogoke; Coach: Ayo Bakare

== Awards ==
2011 All-Africa Games Women's Basketball winner

Senegal
Seventh title

== See also ==
2011 FIBA Africa Championship for Women
