= Basketball at the 2011 All-Africa Games – Men's tournament =

Basketball at the 2011 All-Africa Games men's tournament
Tournament details
- Host country: Mozambique
- Dates: September 9 – 17, 2011
- Teams: 10 (from 53 federations)
- Venue: 1 (in 1 Maputo host cities)

Final positions
- Champions: Nigeria (1st title)

Official website
- All Africa Games: Tournament for Men 2011

The 2011 edition of the women's basketball tournament of the African Games was the 10th, organized by FIBA Africa and played under the auspices of FIBA, the basketball sport governing body. The tournament was held from 9 to 17 September 2011 in Maputo, Mozambique, contested by 10 national teams and won by Nigeria.

== Draw ==
Group A	Group B
Algeria; Mali; Mozambique; Nigeria; Rwanda	Angola; Cape Verde; Egypt; Ivory Coast; South Africa

== Preliminary round ==
Times given below are in UTC+2.

=== Group A ===
Qualified for the quarter-finals

Team	Pld	W	L	PF	PA	PD	Pts
Mozambique	4	3	1	282	258	+24	7
Nigeria	4	3	1	270	221	+49	7
Algeria	4	2	2	260	229	+31	6
Rwanda	4	1	3	270	273	−3	5
Mali	4	1	3	245	308	−63	5

9 September 2011
15:30

Mali	69–86	Rwanda
Scoring by quarter: 16-23, 17-25, 15-20, 21-18

Pavilhão do Desportivo, Maputo

19:30

Algeria	71–58	Mozambique

Pavilhão do Desportivo, Maputo

10 September 2011
13:30

Nigeria	70–63	Rwanda
Scoring by quarter: 14-14, 17-2, 16-20, 23-27

Pavilhão do Desportivo, Maputo

15:30

Algeria	66–73	Mali
Scoring by quarter: 19-20, 15-19, 19-18, 13-16

Pavilhão do Desportivo, Maputo

11 September 2011
15:30

Mozambique	85–55	Mali
Scoring by quarter: 19-22, 23-17, 19-7, 24-9

Pavilhão do Desportivo, Maputo

17:30

Nigeria	63–44	Algeria
Scoring by quarter: 17-19, 12-9, 20-3, 14-13

Pavilhão do Desportivo, Maputo

14 September 2011
13:30

Rwanda	54–60	Algeria
Scoring by quarter: 11-16, 11-17, 21-9, 11-18

Pavilhão do Desportivo, Maputo

19:30

Mozambique	66–65	Nigeria
Scoring by quarter: 18-18, 7-15, 24-19, 17-13

Pavilhão do Desportivo, Maputo

15 September 2011
15:30

Mali	48–71	Nigeria
Scoring by quarter: 7-17, 11-21, 14-18, 16-15

Pavilhão do Desportivo, Maputo

17:30

Rwanda	67–73	Mozambique
Scoring by quarter: 20-15, 13-20, 17-25, 17-13

Pavilhão do Desportivo, Maputo

=== Group B ===
Qualified for the quarter-finals

Team	Pld	W	L	PF	PA	PD	Pts
Angola	4	4	0	293	245	+48	8
Cape Verde	4	3	1	299	216	+83	7
Egypt	4	2	2	287	278	+9	6
Ivory Coast	4	1	3	208	243	-35	5
South Africa	4	0	4	185	290	−105	4

9 September 2011
13:30

Cape Verde	85–53	South Africa
Scoring by quarter: 8-8, 20-12, 31-10, 26-3

Pavilhão do Desportivo, Maputo

17:30

Egypt	66–62	Ivory Coast
Scoring by quarter: 20-5, 15-19, 17-16, 14-22

Pavilhão do Desportivo, Maputo

10 September 2011
17:30

Angola	60–43	Ivory Coast
Scoring by quarter: 12-9, 19-8, 17-8, 12-18

Pavilhão do Desportivo, Maputo

19:30

Cape Verde	80–75	Egypt
Scoring by quarter: 19-17, 18-20, 9-10, 34-28

Pavilhão do Desportivo, Maputo

11 September 2011
13:30

South Africa	48–65	Egypt
Scoring by quarter: 16-16, 14-13, 8-20, 10-16

Pavilhão do Desportivo, Maputo

19:30

Angola	67–62	Cape Verde
Scoring by quarter: 24-19, 13-15, 13-13, 17-15

Pavilhão do Desportivo, Maputo

14 September 2011
15:30

South Africa	59–78	Angola
Scoring by quarter: 20-16, 14-28, 12-16, 13-18

Pavilhão do Desportivo, Maputo

17:30

Ivory Coast	41–72	Cape Verde
Scoring by quarter: 11-22, 5-17, 16-12, 9-21

Pavilhão do Desportivo, Maputo

15 September 2011
13:30

Ivory Coast	62–45	South Africa
Scoring by quarter: 12-20, 13-12, 21-7, 16-6

Pavilhão do Desportivo, Maputo

19:30

Egypt	81–88 (OT)	Angola
Scoring by quarter: 12-17, 12-16, 15-16, 24-14, Overtime: 8-8; 2-9

Pavilhão do Desportivo, Maputo

== Knockout stage ==
=== Championship bracket ===
Quarter-finals
Mozambique	53
Ivory Coast	49
Cape Verde	65
Algeria	73
Nigeria	72
Egypt	59
Rwanda	59
Angola	64

Semi-finals
Mozambique	68
Algeria	45
Nigeria	62
Angola	56

Final
Mozambique	57
Nigeria	62
Third place
Algeria	58
Angola	74

==== Quarterfinals ====
15 September 2011
13:30

Angola	64–59	Rwanda

Pavilhão do Maxaquene, Maputo

15:30

Nigeria	72–59	Egypt

Pavilhão do Maxaquene, Maputo

17:30

Algeria	73–65	Cape Verde

Pavilhão do Maxaquene, Maputo

19:30

Mozambique	53–49	Ivory Coast

Pavilhão do Maxaquene, Maputo

==== Semifinals ====
16 September 2011
17:30

Nigeria	62–56	Angola

Pavilhão do Maxaquene, Maputo

19:30

Mozambique	68–45	Algeria

Pavilhão do Maxaquene, Maputo

==== Bronze medal game ====
17 September 2011
17:30

Angola	74–58	Algeria

Pavilhão do Maxaquene, Maputo

==== Gold medal game ====
17 September 2011
19:30

Nigeria	62–57	Mozambique
Scoring by quarter: 18-14, 10-10, 18-19, 16-14

Pavilhão do Maxaquene, Maputo

=== 5–8th place classification ===
16 September 2011
13:30

Egypt	85–82	Rwanda

Pavilhão do Maxaquene, Maputo

15:30

Cape Verde	80–42	Ivory Coast

Pavilhão do Maxaquene, Maputo

==== 7th place match ====
17 September 2011
13:30

Rwanda	75–62	Ivory Coast

Pavilhão do Maxaquene, Maputo

==== 5th place match ====
17 September 2011
15:30

Egypt	82–78	Cape Verde

Pavilhão do Maxaquene, Maputo

=== 9th place match ===
15 September 2011
11:00

Mali	56–52	South Africa

Pavilhão do Maxaquene, Maputo

== Final standings ==
Rank	Team	Record
Gold medal	Nigeria	6–1
Silver medal	Mozambique	5–2
Bronze medal	Angola	6–1
4	Algeria	3–4
5	Egypt	4–3
6	Cape Verde	4–3
7	Rwanda	2–5
8	Ivory Coast	1–6
9	Mali	2–3
10	South Africa	0–5

1st	2nd	3rd
Nigeria Abdullahi Kuso; Abubakar Usman; Azuoma Dike; Ejike Ugboaja; Emmanuel Ekpete; Ibrahim Yusuf; Jayson Obazuaye; Orseer Ikyaator; Olumide Oyedeji; Solomon Tat; Stanley Gumut; Coach: Sani Ahmed	Mozambique Amarildo Matos; Armando Baptista; Augusto Matos; Custódio Muchate; David Canivete; Fernando Mandlate; Octávio Magoliço; Pio Matos; Samora Mucavel; Sérgio Macuácua; Stélio Nuaila; Sílvio Letela; Coach: Iñaki Garcia	Angola Abdel Gomes; Adolfo Quimbamba; Bráulio Morais; Felizardo Ambrósio; Hélder Ortet; Hermenegildo Santos; Islando Manuel; Mayzer Alexandre; Miguel Kiala; Paulo Santana; Roberto Fortes; Vladimir Ricardino; Coach: Raúl Duarte

== Awards ==
2011 All-Africa Games Men's Basketball winner

Nigeria
First title

== See also ==
2011 FIBA Africa Championship
