= Basketball at the 2007 All-Africa Games =

- League: All Africa Games
- Sport: Basketball
- Duration: July 12 – 22, 2007
- Teams: 11 / 11
- Medallists: Angola (M); Egypt; Nigeria; Senegal (W); Nigeria; Angola

All-Africa Games Basketball seasons
- ← 2003 2011 →

The Basketball tournament at the 2007 All-Africa Games was held in Algeria from 12 July to 22 July. The winners were Angola who defeated Egypt in the finals 56–50.

Group A played in Harcha. Group B played in Staoueli. The quarter-finals were held on 19 July, the semi-finals on 20 July and the final on 22 July. Senegal was drawn into Group A but withdrew before the start of the tournament.

== Competition format ==
The teams with the four best records qualified for the knockout stage, which was a single-elimination tournament. The semifinal winners contested for the gold medal, while the losers played for the bronze medal.

=== Calendar ===
P	Preliminaries	¼	Quarterfinals	½	Semifinals	F	Final

Event↓/Date →	Thu 12	Fri 13	Sat 14	Mon 16	Tue 17	Thu 19	Fri 20	Sun 22
Men	P	P	P	P	P	¼	½	F
Women	P	P	P	P	P	¼	½	F

=== Men's competition ===
Group A	Group B
Algeria; Egypt; Ivory Coast; South Africa; Tunisia	Angola; Cameroon; DR Congo; Liberia; Mali; Nigeria

=== Women's competition ===
Group A	Group B
Angola; Algeria; DR Congo; Ivory Coast; Mozambique	Kenya; Mali; Nigeria; Senegal; Tunisia; Zimbabwe

== Medal summary ==
=== Medal table ===
Rank	Nation	Gold	Silver	Bronze	Total
1	Angola (ANG)	1	0	1	2
2	Senegal (SEN)	1	0	0	1
3	Nigeria (NGR)	0	1	1	2
4	Egypt (EGY)	0	1	0	1
Totals (4 entries)		2	2	2	6

=== Events ===
Event	Gold	Silver	Bronze
Men	Angola Domingos Bonifácio; Fernando Albano; Gerson Monteiro; Idelfonso Kiteculo; Leonel Paulo; Mayzer Alexandre; Nivaldo Sumbo; Simão Panzo; Vicente Neto; Victor Muzadi; Vladimir Ricardino; Walter Costa; Coach: Jaime Covilhã	Egypt Ahmed Hussein; Ashraf Rabie; Haytham Sehrty; Ibrahim El-Gammal; Ismail Ahmed; Kareem Shamseia; Moamen El Einen; Mohamed El-Garhi; Mohamed Mahmoud; Ramy Gunady; Tarek El-Ghannam; Wael El Sayed	Nigeria Abdullahi Kuso; Abdulrahman Mohammed; Abubakar Usman; Chamberlain Oguchi; Ejike Ugboaja; Henry Uhegwu; Jayson Obazuaye; Jeleel Akindele; Michael Umeh; Olumide Oyedeji; Orseer Ikyaator; Stanley Gumut
Women	Senegal Adama Diakhaté; Anta Sy; Astou Traoré; Awa Doumbia; Bineta Diouf; Fatou Dieng; Jeanne Senghor; Magatte Sarr; Mame Diodio Diouf; Mame Paye; Ndèye Séne; Salimata Diatta; Coach: Maguette Diop	Nigeria Charity Egenti; Enjoli Izidor; Erdoo Angwe; Joyce Ekworomadu; Mfon Udoka; Nwamaka Adibeli; Olayinka Sanni; Oluchi Okorie; Priscilla Udeaja; Tamunomiete Whyte; Ugochukwu Oha; Vivian Ewalefo; Coach:	Angola Ângela Cardoso; Astrida Vicente; Bárbara Guimarães; Catarina Camufal; Domitila Ventura; Irene Guerreiro; Isabel Francisco; Jaquelina Francisco; Luísa Tomás; Maria Afonso; Nacissela Maurício; Ngiendula Filipe; Coach:

== Final standings ==
Rank	Men				Women			
Rank	Team	Pld	W	L	Team	Pld	W	L
1st place, gold medalist(s)	Angola	8	8	0	Senegal	8	7	1
2nd place, silver medalist(s)	Egypt	7	6	1	Nigeria	8	7	1
3rd place, bronze medalist(s)	Nigeria	8	6	2	Angola	7	5	2
4.	Mali	8	4	4	Mozambique	7	4	3
Eliminated at the quarterfinals
5.	Algeria	7	4	3	Kenya	8	5	3
6.	Ivory Coast	7	4	3	Algeria	7	3	4
7.	South Africa	7	2	5	Tunisia	8	3	5
8.	Cameroon	8	2	6	DR Congo	7	2	5
Preliminary round 5th placers
9.	DR Congo	6	2	4	Ivory Coast	5	1	4
10.	Tunisia	5	0	5	Mali	6	1	5
Preliminary round 6th placers
11.	Liberia	5	0	5	Zimbabwe	5	0	5
