= Nigeria men's national basketball team =

Men's national basketball team representing Nigeria

Nigeria
- FIBA ranking: 53 (13 July 2026)
- Joined FIBA: 1964
- FIBA zone: FIBA Africa
- National federation: Nigeria Basketball Federation
- Coach: David Fizdale
- Nickname: D'Tigers

Olympic Games
- Appearances: 3

FIBA World Cup
- Appearances: 3

AfroBasket
- Appearances: 20
- Medals: (gold) Gold: (2015); (silver) Silver: (1997, 1999, 2003, 2017); (bronze) Bronze: (1995, 2005, 2011)

African Games
- Appearances: 8
- Medals: (gold) Gold: (2011); (bronze) Bronze: (1995, 1999, 2003, 2007, 2015)
Home	Away

First international
- Senegal 101–30 Nigeria (Dakar, Senegal; 25 December 1971)

Biggest win
- Liberia 35–109 Nigeria (Huambo, Angola; 17 August 2007)

Biggest defeat
- United States 156–73 Nigeria (London, United Kingdom; 2 August 2012)

The Nigeria men's national basketball team represents Nigeria in international basketball, and it is governed by the Nigeria Basketball Federation (NBBF).

In March 2021, the global governing body FIBA ranked Nigeria as Africa's top men's basketball nation. After the 2016 Olympic Men's Basketball Tournament in Rio, Nigeria was ranked 16th in the FIBA World Rankings, making them the top climber in FIBA rankings from 2015.

Nigeria is the only African nation to beat the United States. Nigeria is also the first African team to qualify for the Summer Olympics through the FIBA World Olympic Qualifying Tournament. This was accomplished at the 2012 Event when Nigeria beat the world elite teams of Lithuania and Greece. In 2015, Nigeria won its first crown as basketball champion of Africa.

== History ==
The history of basketball in Nigeria goes as far back as the late 1950s when Walid Zabadne served as the first basketball coach to train Nigerians. At the time, Nigeria's only basketball court was situated in the Syrian Club in Lagos. Walid Zabadne continued teaching young Nigerians to become basketballers and when Nigeria's basketball federation was organized, he took them to several basketball competitions across Africa. In view of his role as the pioneer of basketball in Nigeria, Walid Zabadne has been deemed "father of Nigerian basketball". Also worthy of note is that Zabadne was later made the president of the Nigerian Basketball Federation.

Nigeria's national basketball team joined FIBA in 1964. Since the mid-1990s, the team has enjoyed unprecedented success, due to an increasing amount of talents from Nigeria as well as an orchestrated recruitment of American college and professional players of Nigerian descent. The D'Tigers (as the team is nicknamed) qualified for the 2006 FIBA World Championship, marking only the second time in the country's history that they qualified to the FIBA World Cup. Team Nigeria usually plays its home games at the 3,000-capacity Indoor Sports Hall in Lagos.

=== 2006 FIBA World Championship ===
Nigeria took part in the 2006 FIBA World Championship in Japan. They were drawn in Group A with Argentina, France, Lebanon, Serbia and Montenegro, and Venezuela. They surprisingly finished third in Group A, then were narrowly defeated by Germany in the Round of 16. Overall they finished 14th, as they achieved the same record as the defending world champion Serbia and Montenegro.

=== 2012 Summer Olympics ===
Nigeria competed at the 2012 Summer Olympics. They finished the group play with a 1–4 record, with their lone victory coming against Tunisia in their Olympics debut. The team's roster, assembled by coach Ayodele Bakare, primarily comprised former college basketball players.

=== 2016 Summer Olympics ===
Nigeria qualified for the 2016 Summer Olympics tournament as champions of AfroBasket 2015. They finished at the bottom of Group B, winning one game against Croatia and losing four games. The team entered the 2016 games with several injured players and little financial support from the Nigerian government.

=== 2020 Summer Olympics ===
As the top African team at the 2019 FIBA Basketball World Cup, Nigeria qualified for their third consecutive Olympics berth for the 2020 Summer Olympics. The team, which included seven NBA players and was led by Golden State Warriors assistant coach Mike Brown, was called up for training in the United States in June 2021. D'Tigers defeated the United States 90–87 during an exhibition game in Las Vegas on 10 July. The victory, described as an "upset", was the first for an African team against the United States.

== Team honours and achievements ==
Intercontinental

- FIBA Stanković Continental Champions' Cup
  - Bronze: 2013, 2016
- Basketball at the Commonwealth Games
  - Fourth-place: 2006

Continental

- AfroBasket
  - Gold Medal: 2015
  - Silver Medal: 1997, 1999, 2003, 2017
  - Bronze Medal: 1995, 2005, 2011
- All Africa Games
  - Gold Medal: (gold) 2011
  - Bronze Medal: (bronze) 1995, (bronze) 1999, (bronze) 2003, (bronze) 2007, (bronze) 2015

== Competitive record ==
=== Olympic Games ===
Olympics record						Qualification record		
Year	Round	Position	GP	W	L	GP	W	L
(Japan) 1964	Did not qualify					AfroBasket served as qualification		
(Mexico) 1968	Did not qualify					AfroBasket served as qualification		
(West Germany) 1972	Did not qualify					AfroBasket served as qualification		
(Canada) 1976	Did not qualify					AfroBasket served as qualification		
(Soviet Union) 1980	Did not qualify					AfroBasket served as qualification		
(United States) 1984	Did not qualify					AfroBasket served as qualification		
(South Korea) 1988	Did not qualify					AfroBasket served as qualification		
(Spain) 1992	Did not qualify					AfroBasket served as qualification		
(United States) 1996	Did not qualify					AfroBasket served as qualification		
(Australia) 2000	Did not qualify					AfroBasket served as qualification		
(Greece) 2004	Did not qualify					AfroBasket served as qualification		
(China) 2008	Did not qualify					AfroBasket served as qualification		
(United Kingdom) 2012	Preliminary round	10th	5	1	4	AfroBasket served as qualification		
(Brazil) 2016	Preliminary round	11th	5	1	4	AfroBasket served as qualification		
(Japan) 2020	Preliminary round	10th	3	0	3	AfroBasket served as qualification		
(France) 2024	Did not qualify					2	0	2
			13	2	11	2	0	2

=== FIBA World Cup ===
FIBA World Cup record						Qualification record		
Year	Round	Position	GP	W	L	GP	W	L
(Uruguay) 1967	Did not qualify					AfroBasket served as qualification		
(Socialist Federal Republic of Yugoslavia) 1970	Did not qualify					AfroBasket served as qualification		
(Puerto Rico) 1974	Did not qualify					AfroBasket served as qualification		
(Philippines) 1978	Did not qualify					AfroBasket served as qualification		
(Colombia) 1982	Did not qualify					AfroBasket served as qualification		
(Spain) 1986	Did not qualify					AfroBasket served as qualification		
(Argentina) 1990	Did not qualify					AfroBasket served as qualification		
(Canada) 1994	Did not qualify					AfroBasket served as qualification		
(Greece) 1998	Preliminary round	13th	5	2	3	AfroBasket served as qualification		
(United States) 2002	Did not qualify					AfroBasket served as qualification		
(Japan) 2006	Round of 16	14th	6	2	4	AfroBasket served as qualification		
(Turkey) 2010	Did not qualify					AfroBasket served as qualification		
(Spain) 2014	Did not qualify					AfroBasket served as qualification		
(China) 2019	Preliminary round	17th	5	3	2	12	10	2
(Philippines) (Japan) (Indonesia) 2023	Did not qualify					10	5	5
(Qatar) 2027	To be determined					In Progress		
(France) 2031	To be determined					To be determined		
		3/16	16	7	9	22	15	7

=== AfroBasket ===
Year	Round	Position	GP	W	L
(Tunisia) 1965	Did not enter				
(Morocco) 1968	Did not enter				
(Egypt) 1970	Did not enter				
(Senegal) 1972	Classification stage	12th	6	0	6
(Central African Republic) 1974	Did not enter				
(Egypt) 1975	Did not enter				
(Senegal) 1978	Classification stage	6th	5	2	3
(Morocco) 1980	Preliminary round	11th	5	1	4
(Somalia) 1981	Did not enter				
(Egypt) 1983	Did not enter				
(Ivory Coast) 1985	Classification stage	7th	6	3	3
(Tunisia) 1987	Classification stage	8th	4	1	3
(Angola) 1989	Did not enter				
(Egypt) 1992	Classification stage	5th	6	4	2
(Kenya) 1993	Did not enter				
(Algeria) 1995	Third place	3rd place, bronze medalist(s)	6	4	2
(Senegal) 1997	Runners-up	2nd place, silver medalist(s)	6	5	1
(Angola) 1999	Runners-up	2nd place, silver medalist(s)	7	5	2
(Morocco) 2001	Classification stage	5th	6	5	1
(Egypt) 2003	Runners-up	2nd place, silver medalist(s)	7	5	2
(Algeria) 2005	Third place	3rd place, bronze medalist(s)	8	6	2
(Angola) 2007	Quarter-finals	5th	6	5	1
(Libya) 2009	Quarter-finals	5th	9	7	2
(Madagascar) 2011	Third place	3rd place, bronze medalist(s)	7	6	1
(Ivory Coast) 2013	Quarterfinals	7th	7	5	2
(Tunisia) 2015	Champions	1st place, gold medalist(s)	7	6	1
(Tunisia) (Senegal) 2017	Runners-up	2nd place, silver medalist(s)	6	4	2
(Rwanda) 2021	Round of 16	12th	4	2	2
(Angola) 2025	Quarter-finals	6th	4	3	1
Total	1 Title	20/31	122	79	43

=== FIBA AfroCan ===
Year	Round	Position	GP	W	L
(Mali) 2019	11th place	11th	3	0	3
(Angola) 2023	8th place	8th	6	3	3
(Rwanda) 2027	To be determined				
Total		2/3	9	3	6

=== African Games ===
- 1973 – ?
- 1987 – ?
- 1995 – (bronze)
- 1999 – (bronze)
- 2003 – (bronze)
- 2007 – (bronze)
- 2011 – (gold)
- 2015 – (bronze)

=== FIBA Stanković Continental Champions' Cup ===
- 2013 – (bronze)
- 2016 – (bronze)

=== Commonwealth Games ===
Commonwealth Games record
Year	Round	Position	Pld	W	L
(Australia) 2006	Semi-Final	4th	5	2	3
(Australia) 2018	Quarter-Final	6th	4	0	4
Total	2/2	4th	9	2	7

== Team ==
=== Current roster ===
Roster for the AfroBasket 2025.

Nigeria men's national basketball team roster
Players
Coaches

Pos.	No.	Name	Age – Date of birth	Height	Club	Ctr.
C	0	Kaodirichi Akobundu-Ehiogu	25 – 7 October 1999	2.09 m (6 ft 10 in)	Basquet Manresa	(Spain)
G	1	Mike Nuga	27 – 27 December 1997	1.88 m (6 ft 2 in)	Edmonton Stingers	(Canada)
G	2	Josh Okogie	26 – 1 September 1998	1.93 m (6 ft 4 in)	Houston Rockets	(United States)
G	3	Caleb Agada	30 – 31 August 1994	1.96 m (6 ft 5 in)	Al Ahli	(Libya)
SF	5	Stan Okoye	34 – 10 April 1991	1.98 m (6 ft 6 in)	MoraBanc Andorra	(Spain)
PF	7	Emmanuel Omogbo	30 – 28 May 1995	2.03 m (6 ft 8 in)	UB Chartres Métropole	(France)
SF	8	Ugo Simon	23 – 25 February 2002	1.96 m (6 ft 5 in)	A Dil Polisportiva Vigor	(Italy)
PF	9	Martins Igbanu	28 – 12 April 1997	2.03 m (6 ft 8 in)	Tokyo Hachioji Bee Trains	(Japan)
PF	13	Talib Zanna	34 – 1 October 1990	2.06 m (6 ft 9 in)	Tauranga Whai	(New Zealand)
F	17	Christian Mekowulu	30 – 17 March 1995	2.05 m (6 ft 9 in)	Akita Northern Happinets	(Japan)
PF	23	Devine Eke	29 – 29 July 1996	2.03 m (6 ft 8 in)	ASC Ville de Dakar	(Senegal)
G	34	Ike Nwamu (C)	32 – 3 June 1993	1.96 m (6 ft 5 in)	UB Chartres Métropole	(France)

Head coach

- (Nigeria) Abdulrahman Mohammed

Assistant coach(es)

- (Nigeria) Deji Akindele

Legend

- (C) Team captain
- Club – describes last
  club before the tournament
- Age – describes age
  on 12 August 2025

=== Notable players ===
Several players of the Nigeria national team have had success playing for professional teams, in the NBA, or in Europe, including:

- Julius Nwosu
- Akin Akingbala
- Peter Aluma
- Aloysius Anagonye
- Tunji Awajobi
- Ike Diogu
- Obinna Ekezie
- Ebi Ere
- Benjamin Eze
- Ekene Ibekwe
- Ike Iroegbu (born 1995)
- Gani Lawal
- Michael Olowokandi
- Olumide Oyedeji
- Ime Udoka
- Jeff Varem
- Al-Farouq Aminu
- Festus Ezeli

Hakeem Olajuwon never played for Nigeria at the international senior level, and would eventually play for the United States, after becoming a US citizen in 1993.

=== Past rosters ===
2009 African Championship: finished 5th among 16 teams

Akin Akingbala, Aloysius Anagonye, Chamberlain Oguchi, Deji Akindele, Michael Efevberha, Michael Umeh, Josh Akognon, Ebi Ere, Ejike Ugboaja, Gabe Muoneke, Jayson Obazuaye, Benson Egemonye (Coach: John Lucas II)

2011 African Championship: finished 3rd among 16 teams

Solomon Tat, Ime Udoka, Abubakar Usman, Chinedu Onyeuku, Ike Ofoegbu, Michael Umeh, Stanley Gumut, Derrick Obasohan, Ejike Ugboaja, Ezenwa Ukeagu, Jayson Obazuaye, Olumide Oyedeji (Coach: Ayo Bakare)

2012 Summer Olympics: finished 10th among 12 teams

Tony Skinn, Ekene Ibekwe, Ike Diogu, Al-Farouq Aminu, Ade Dagunduro, Chamberlain Oguchi, Koko Archibong, Richard Oruche, Ejike Ugboaja, Derrick Obasohan, Alade Aminu, Olumide Oyedeji (Coach: Ayo Bakare)

2020 Olympic roster: A 15-player roster was announced on 6 July 2021. The final squad was released on 20 July 2021.

2020 Olympic roster

Nigeria national basketball team roster
Players
Coaches

Pos.	No.	Name	Age – Date of birth	Height	Club	Ctr.
F	0	KZ Okpala	22 – 28 April 1999	2.03 m (6 ft 8 in)	Miami Heat	(United States)
G	3	Caleb Agada	26 – 31 August 1994	1.91 m (6 ft 3 in)	Hapoel Be'er Sheva	(Israel)
C	8	Ekpe Udoh	34 – 20 May 1987	2.08 m (6 ft 10 in)	Virtus Bologna	(Italy)
PF	10	Chimezie Metu	24 – 22 March 1997	2.11 m (6 ft 11 in)	Sacramento Kings	(United States)
SG	11	Obi Emegano	28 – 29 April 1993	1.89 m (6 ft 2 in)	Fuenlabrada	(Spain)
G	13	Miye Oni	23 – 4 August 1997	1.96 m (6 ft 5 in)	Utah Jazz	(United States)
C	15	Jahlil Okafor	25 – 15 December 1995	2.08 m (6 ft 10 in)	Atlanta Hawks	(United States)
G	20	Josh Okogie	22 – 1 September 1998	1.93 m (6 ft 4 in)	Minnesota Timberwolves	(United States)
G	22	Gabe Vincent	25 – 14 June 1996	1.90 m (6 ft 3 in)	Miami Heat	(United States)
F	33	Jordan Nwora	22 – 9 September 1998	2.03 m (6 ft 8 in)	Milwaukee Bucks	(United States)
G	34	Ike Nwamu	28 – 3 June 1993	1.96 m (6 ft 5 in)	Samara	(Russia)
PF	55	Precious Achiuwa	21 – 19 September 1999	2.03 m (6 ft 8 in)	Miami Heat	(United States)

Head coach

- (United States) Mike Brown

Assistant coach(es)

- (Spain) Jordi Fernández
- (Nigeria) Alexander Nwora

Legend

- Club – describes last
  club before the tournament
- Age – describes age
  on 25 July 2021

=== Head coaches ===
- (Socialist Federal Republic of Yugoslavia) Vladislav Lučić 1975–1980
- (United States) Sam Vincent 2004–2006
- (Nigeria) Sani Ahmed 2006
- (United States) Robert McCullum 2007
- (United States) John Lucas II 2009
- (Nigeria) Sani Ahmed 2010, 2013
- (Nigeria) Ayo Bakare 2011–2014
- (United States) William Voigt 2015–2017
- (Nigeria) Alexander Nwora 2017–present Associate Headcoach from 2020–present.
- (United States) Mike Brown 2020–2022
- (United States) Alan Major July 2022–?
- (Nigeria) Abdulrahman Mohammed 2024–November 2025
- (United States) David Fizdale May 2026–present

== Kit ==
=== Manufacturer ===
2019–present: Peak

== See also ==
- Nigeria national under-19 basketball team
- Nigeria national under-17 basketball team
- Nigeria women's national basketball team
