= Basketball at the African Games =

- Basketball
- Frequency: Every four years
- Inaugurated: 1965 (Republic of the Congo) Brazzaville
- Most recent: 2015 (Republic of the Congo) Brazzaville
- Most successful team(s): Senegal (SEN)

Basketball has been a discipline of the African Games event since the first edition in 1965 in Brazzaville, Republic of the Congo.

Starting at the 2019 event, "regular" 5-on-5 basketball was replaced by 3x3 basketball.

== Men's tournaments ==
=== Summaries ===
Men's Basketball
Year	Host	Gold	Silver	Bronze
1965; Details	(Republic of the Congo) Brazzaville	Egypt	Senegal	Congo
1973; Details	(Nigeria) Lagos	Tunisia	Cameroon	Egypt
1978; Details	(Algeria) Algiers	Senegal	Ivory Coast	Tunisia
1987; Details	(Kenya) Nairobi	Angola	Senegal	Ivory Coast
1991; Details	(Egypt) Cairo	Egypt	Central African Republic	Senegal
1995; Details	(Zimbabwe) Harare	Egypt	Mali	Nigeria
1999; Details	(South Africa) Johannesburg	Egypt	Angola	Nigeria
2003; Details	(Nigeria) Abuja	Angola	Senegal	Nigeria
2007; Details	(Algeria) Algiers	Angola	Egypt	Nigeria
2011; Details	(Mozambique) Maputo	Nigeria	Mozambique	Angola
2015; Details	(Republic of the Congo) Brazzaville	Angola	Egypt	Nigeria

=== Participating nations ===
Nation	65 (Republic of the Congo)	73 (Nigeria)	78 (Algeria)	87 (Kenya)	91 (Egypt)	95 (Zimbabwe)	99 (South Africa)	03 (Nigeria)	07 (Algeria)	11 (Mozambique)	15 (Republic of the Congo)	Years
Algeria	4th		4th			?			5th	4th		5
Angola				1st		?	2nd	1st	1st	3rd	1st	7
Burkina Faso		?										1
Cameroon		2nd					4th		8th		?	4
Cape Verde										6th	?	2
Central African Republic					2nd							1
Congo	3rd										6th	2
DR Congo									9th			1
Ivory Coast		?	2nd	3rd				4th	6th	8th	7th	7
Egypt	1st	3rd			1st	1st	1st		2nd	5th	2nd	8
Gabon											8th	1
Kenya				4th								1
Liberia									11th			1
Madagascar				?								1
Mali			3rd			2nd			4th	9th	4th	5
Mozambique					?					2nd	5th	3
Nigeria		?		?		3rd	3rd	3rd	3rd	1st	3rd	8
Rwanda										7th		1
Senegal	2nd	4th	1st	2nd	3rd		5th	2nd				7
Seychelles											9th	1
Somalia				?								1
South Africa							6th		7th	10th		3
Tunisia		1st	3rd						10th			2
Zimbabwe				?		?						2

=== Medal table, men's ===
Rank	Nation	Gold	Silver	Bronze	Total
1	Egypt	4	2	1	7
2	Angola	4	1	1	6
3	Senegal	1	3	1	5
4	Nigeria	1	0	5	6
5	Tunisia	1	0	1	2
6	Ivory Coast	0	1	1	2
7	Cameroon	0	1	0	1
7	Central African Republic	0	1	0	1
7	Mali	0	1	0	1
7	Mozambique	0	1	0	1
11	Congo	0	0	1	1
Totals (11 entries)		11	11	11	33

== Women's tournaments ==
=== Summaries ===
Women's Basketball
Year	Host	Gold	Silver	Bronze
1965; Details	(Republic of the Congo) Brazzaville	Senegal	Madagascar	Egypt
1973; Details	(Nigeria) Lagos	Senegal	Madagascar	Egypt
1978; Details	(Algeria) Algiers	Senegal	Cameroon	Nigeria
1987; Details	(Kenya) Nairobi	Zaire	Angola	Senegal
1991; Details	(Egypt) Cairo	Mozambique	Senegal	Zaire
1995; Details	(Zimbabwe) Harare	Senegal	Mozambique	Egypt
1999; Details	(South Africa) Johannesburg	Senegal	DR Congo	Nigeria
2003; Details	(Nigeria) Abuja	Nigeria	DR Congo	Senegal
2007; Details	(Algeria) Algiers	Senegal	Nigeria	Angola
2011; Details	(Mozambique) Maputo	Senegal	Angola	Nigeria
2015; Details	(Republic of the Congo) Brazzaville	Mali	Nigeria	Angola

=== Participating nations ===
Nation	65 (Republic of the Congo)	73 (Nigeria)	78 (Algeria)	87 (Kenya)	91 (Egypt)	95 (Zimbabwe)	99 (South Africa)	03 (Nigeria)	07 (Algeria)	11 (Mozambique)	15 (Republic of the Congo)	Years
Algeria			?						6th	8th	9th	4
Angola				2nd				4th	3rd	2nd	3rd	5
Cameroon			2nd							9th	5th	3
Congo											10th	1
DR Congo				1st	3rd		2nd	2nd	8th	10th		6
Ivory Coast								6th	9th	5th	7th	4
Egypt	3rd	3rd			?	3rd						4
Gabon											8th	1
Kenya				7th				5th	5th	6th		4
Madagascar	2nd	2nd									?	3
Mali									10th	12th	1st	3
Mozambique				4th	1st	2nd	5th		4th	4th	6th	7
Nigeria			3rd	6th		4th	3rd	1st	2nd	3rd	2nd	8
Rwanda										7th		1
Senegal	1st	1st	1st	3rd	2nd	1st	1st	3rd	1st	1st	4th	11
Somalia				5th								1
South Africa							6th				?	2
Tunisia							4th		7th			2
Uganda											?	1
Zimbabwe						?			11th	11th		3

=== Medal table, women's ===
Rank	Nation	Gold	Silver	Bronze	Total
1	Senegal	7	1	2	10
2	Nigeria	1	2	3	6
3	DR Congo	1	2	1	4
4	Mozambique	1	1	0	2
5	Mali	1	0	0	1
6	Angola	0	2	2	4
7	Madagascar	0	2	0	2
8	Cameroon	0	1	0	1
9	Egypt	0	0	3	3
Totals (9 entries)		11	11	11	33

== Medal table, combined ==
Rank	Nation	Gold	Silver	Bronze	Total
1	Senegal (SEN)	8	4	3	15
2	Angola (ANG)	4	3	3	10
3	Egypt (EGY)	4	2	4	10
4	Nigeria (NGR)	2	2	8	12
5	(Democratic Republic of the Congo) DR Congo (COD)	1	2	1	4
6	Mozambique (MOZ)	1	2	0	3
7	Mali (MLI)	1	1	1	3
8	Tunisia (TUN)	1	0	1	2
9	Cameroon (CMR)	0	2	0	2
9	Madagascar (MAD)	0	2	0	2
11	Ivory Coast (CIV)	0	1	1	2
12	Central African Republic (CAF)	0	1	0	1
Totals (12 entries)		22	22	22	66

- DR Congo : ex. Zaire
