= 2013 FIBA Africa Championship for Women =

2013 FIBA Women's AfroBasket
21st FIBA Women's African Basketball Championship

Tournament details
- Host country: Mozambique
- City: Maputo
- Dates: 20–29 September
- Teams: 12 (from 53 federations)
- Venue: 1 (in 1 host city)

Final positions
- Champions: Angola (2nd title)

Tournament statistics
- MVP: (Angola) Nacissela Maurício
- Top scorer: (Zimbabwe) Chamwarura 16.7
- Top rebounds: (Mali) Coulibaly 9.3
- Top assists: (Mozambique) Ngulela 5.4

Official website
- www.fiba.basketball/history

The 2013 FIBA Africa Championship for Women was the 21st FIBA Africa Championship for Women, played under the rules of FIBA, the world governing body for basketball, and the FIBA Africa thereof. The tournament was hosted by Mozambique from 20 to 29 September 2013, with games played at the Pavilhão do Maxaquene in Maputo.

== Draw ==
Group A	Group B
Algeria; Egypt; Ivory Coast; Mozambique; Senegal; Zimbabwe	Angola; Cameroon; Cape Verde; Kenya; Mali; Nigeria

== Preliminary round ==
Times given below are local UTC+2.

=== Group A ===
Qualified for the quarter-finals

Team	Pld	W	L	PF	PA	PD	Pts
Mozambique	5	5	0	422	217	+205	10
Senegal	5	4	1	436	248	+188	9
Ivory Coast	5	3	2	270	258	+12	8
Egypt	5	2	3	326	394	−68	7
Algeria	5	1	4	239	363	−124	6
Zimbabwe	5	0	5	244	464	−220	5

20 September 2013
09:30

Boxscore

Egypt	69–100	Senegal
Scoring by quarter: 16–28, 14–23, 21–20, 18–29
Pts: Mahmoud 13; Rebs: Amer 5 Asts: Osama 2		Pts: Ay. Traoré 14; Rebs: Sy 7 Asts: Dieng 7

Pavilhão do Maxaquene, Maputo

20 September 2013
18:00

Boxscore

Mozambique	117–28	Zimbabwe
Scoring by quarter: 35–12, 32–6, 29–7, 21–3
Pts: Anabela 20; Rebs: Leia 11; Asts: Ngulela 13		Pts: Marondera 12; Rebs: Marondera 5 Asts: three players 1

Pavilhão do Maxaquene, Maputo

20 September 2013
21:45

Boxscore

Ivory Coast	56–48	Algeria
Scoring by quarter: 9–7, 15–8, 14–22, 18–11
Pts: Berte, Kouyaté 17; Rebs: Kouyaté, Diaby 7 Asts: three players 2		Pts: Aissani 11; Rebs: Taïbi 7 Asts: Saidani 3

Pavilhão do Maxaquene, Maputo

21 September 2013
12:15

Boxscore

Zimbabwe	66–73	Algeria
Scoring by quarter: 12–24, 20–14, 8–16, 26–19
Pts: Marondera 24; Rebs: Marondera 11; Asts: Chareka, Mabasa 1		Pts: Taïbi 20; Rebs: Taïbi 6 Asts: Belaidi 4

Pavilhão do Maxaquene, Maputo

21 September 2013
19:00

Boxscore

Egypt	53–105	Mozambique
Scoring by quarter: 18–25, 11–21, 11–29, 13–30
Pts: Awad 12; Rebs: Awad 4 Asts: three players 1		Pts: Clarisse 17; Rebs: Leia 4 Asts: Ngulela 5

Pavilhão do Maxaquene, Maputo

21 September 2013
21:15

Boxscore

Senegal	50–35	Ivory Coast
Scoring by quarter: 13–9, 16–12, 13–6, 8–8
Pts: As. Traoré 13; Rebs: Sy 5 Asts: As. Traoré, Dieng 2		Pts: Kouyaté 12; Rebs: three players 1 Asts: three players 1

Pavilhão do Maxaquene, Maputo

23 September 2013
12:15

Boxscore

Zimbabwe	45–123	Senegal
Scoring by quarter: 11–23, 9–27, 15–36, 10–27
Pts: Dorcas 12; Rebs: Fadzai 5 Asts: Fadzai, Sharon 2		Pts: Diodio 20; Rebs: Ndeye 8 Asts: Diodio 7

Pavilhão do Maxaquene, Maputo

23 September 2013
16:45

Boxscore

Egypt	54–72	Ivory Coast
Scoring by quarter: 7–23, 18–15, 13–18, 16–16
Pts: Reem 21; Rebs: Hagar 9 Asts: May Hussein 3		Pts: Salimata 20; Rebs: Kouyaté 8 Asts: Kouyaté 4

Pavilhão do Maxaquene, Maputo

23 September 2013
19:00

Boxscore

Mozambique	67–34	Algeria
Scoring by quarter: 12–8, 18–12, 13–7, 24–7
Pts: Leia, Rute 13; Rebs: Leia, Odélia 9 Asts: Valerdina 4		Pts: Ikbal 9 Rebs: Shahnez 6 Asts: Samiya 4

Pavilhão do Maxaquene, Maputo

24 September 2013
10:00

Boxscore

Egypt	85–55	Zimbabwe
Scoring by quarter: 20–14, 22–11, 22–13, 21–17
Pts: Menatalla 28; Rebs: Menatalla 8 Asts: Dina 4		Pts: Sharon 28; Rebs: Sharon 10; Asts: Geraldine Tsitsi 4

Pavilhão do Maxaquene, Maputo

24 September 2013
16:45

Boxscore

Algeria	22–102	Senegal
Scoring by quarter: 7–32, 6–23, 4–23, 5–24
Pts: Meriem 6 Rebs: Nesrine, Meriem 4 Asts: three players 1		Pts: As. Traoré 24; Rebs: Sy 7 Asts: Dieng 6

Pavilhão do Maxaquene, Maputo

24 September 2013
19:00

Boxscore

Ivory Coast	41–56	Mozambique
Scoring by quarter: 8–18, 12–14, 11–9, 10–15
Pts: M. Meite 16; Rebs: Djedjemel 8 Asts: Kouyaté 2		Pts: Leia 16; Rebs: Leia 10; Asts: Ngulela 3

Pavilhão do Maxaquene, Maputo

25 September 2013
10:00

Boxscore

Ivory Coast	66–50	Zimbabwe
Scoring by quarter: 16–13, 24–11, 10–13, 16–13
Pts: Diabate, Kouyaté 14; Rebs: Fofana 9 Asts: Cisse 4		Pts: Mabasa, Chamwarura 13; Rebs: Mabasa 5 Asts: Mabasa 4

Pavilhão do Maxaquene, Maputo

25 September 2013
12:15

Boxscore

Algeria	62–72	Egypt
Scoring by quarter: 9–9, 16–22, 21–26, 16–15
Pts: Taïbi 21; Rebs: Taïbi 10; Asts: Belaidi 6		Pts: Osama 21; Rebs: May Hussein 8 Asts: Aliaa 6

Pavilhão do Maxaquene, Maputo

25 September 2013
19:00

Boxscore

Mozambique	77–61	Senegal
Scoring by quarter: 16–16, 16–17, 21–15, 24–13
Pts: Ngulela 21; Rebs: Clarisse 9 Asts: Ngulela 5		Pts: As. Traoré 17; Rebs: four players 3 Asts: three players 2

Pavilhão do Maxaquene, Maputo

=== Group B ===
Qualified for the quarter-finals

Team	Pld	W	L	PF	PA	PD	Pts
Angola	5	5	0	296	246	+50	10
Cameroon	5	4	1	305	255	+50	9
Mali	5	3	2	344	283	+61	8
Nigeria	5	2	3	290	313	−23	7
Kenya	5	1	4	233	306	−73	6
Cape Verde	5	0	5	270	335	−65	5

20 September 2013
11:45

Boxscore

Mali	73–62	Cape Verde
Scoring by quarter: 27–16, 12–15, 23–18, 11–13
Pts: Diawara 28; Rebs: Diawara 7 Asts: Bagayoko 4		Pts: Jade 26; Rebs: Vandell, Áurea 3 Asts: Jade 4

Pavilhão do Maxaquene, Maputo

20 September 2013
14:00

Boxscore

Cameroon	61–39	Kenya
Scoring by quarter: 18–11, 12–7, 13–12, 18–9
Pts: Njiogap 12; Rebs: Guotué 6 Asts: Mbiandja, Njonkou 4		Pts: Auma 10; Rebs: Auma 8 Asts: Mjomba, Ouma 2

Pavilhão do Maxaquene, Maputo

20 September 2013
16:15

Boxscore

Angola	60–46	Nigeria
Scoring by quarter: 15–13, 10–9, 20–10, 15–14
Pts: Nadir 14; Rebs: Nadir, Nacissela 10; Asts: Nacissela 4		Pts: Madu 10; Rebs: Ukato 7 Asts: Ogunjimi 2

Pavilhão do Maxaquene, Maputo

21 September 2013
10:00

Boxscore

Nigeria	74–49	Kenya
Scoring by quarter: 17–11, 15–11, 15–6, 27–21
Pts: Madu 17; Rebs: Madu 8 Asts: Ukato 3		Pts: Shani 17; Rebs: Shani 7 Asts: Luvandwa 3

Pavilhão do Maxaquene, Maputo

21 September 2013
14:30

Boxscore

Mali	64–67	Cameroon
Scoring by quarter: 10–19, 17–13, 26–14, 11–21
Pts: Diawara 24; Rebs: Coulibaly 9 Asts: Tireira 2		Pts: Mbiandja 19; Rebs: Njiogap, Guotué 4 Asts: Nimpa 4

Pavilhão do Maxaquene, Maputo

21 September 2013
16:45

Boxscore

Cape Verde	51–76	Angola
Scoring by quarter: 16–20, 11–21, 17–12, 7–23
Pts: Jade 20; Rebs: Vandell 6 Asts: Lorreta 2		Pts: Nacissela 15; Rebs: Nacissela 9 Asts: Nacissela 6

Pavilhão do Maxaquene, Maputo

23 September 2013
10:00

Boxscore

Cape Verde	39–62	Cameroon
Scoring by quarter: 10–21, 5–17, 11–10, 13–14
Pts: Vandell 12; Rebs: Vandell 10; Asts: Ornela 2		Pts: Tsoungui 13; Rebs: Nimpa 9 Asts: Mbiandja 3

Pavilhão do Maxaquene, Maputo

23 September 2013
14:30

Boxscore

Angola	45–39	Kenya
Scoring by quarter: 9–9, 7–8, 15–14, 14–8
Pts: Clarisse 14; Rebs: Nadir 11; Asts: Catarina 2		Pts: Ouma 11; Rebs: Shani 8 Asts: Jumba 2

Pavilhão do Maxaquene, Maputo

23 September 2013
21:15

Boxscore

Nigeria	45–78	Mali
Scoring by quarter: 14–22, 8–14, 15–24, 8–18
Pts: Ogoke 14; Rebs: Omotola 5 Asts: Ogoke, Udeaja 1		Pts: Diawara 17; Rebs: Coulibaly 12; Asts: Bagayoko 4

Pavilhão do Maxaquene, Maputo

24 September 2013
12:15

Boxscore

Kenya	42–63	Mali
Scoring by quarter: 14–14, 7–15, 17–17, 4–17
Pts: Luvandwa 10; Rebs: Auma 10; Asts: Ouma 2		Pts: Bagayoko 21; Rebs: Coulibaly 12; Asts: Tireira 4

Pavilhão do Maxaquene, Maputo

24 September 2013
16:45

Boxscore

Cameroon	44–48	Angola
Scoring by quarter: 12–7, 10–11, 9–19, 13–11
Pts: Senken 17; Rebs: Gano 8 Asts: Mbiandja, Lonlack 2		Pts: Nadir 14; Rebs: three players 5 Asts: four players 1

Pavilhão do Maxaquene, Maputo

24 September 2013
21:15

Bocscore

Cape Verde	55–60	Nigeria
Scoring by quarter: 9–12, 14–21, 19–7, 13–20
Pts: Vandell 18; Rebs: Djenifer 10; Asts: Jade 3		Pts: Atosu 11; Rebs: Udenze 8 Asts: three players 2

Pavilhão do Maxaquene, Maputo

25 September 2013
14:30

Bocscore

Kenya	64–63 (OT)	Cape Verde
Scoring by quarter: 16–15, 17–9, 6–16, 14–13, Overtime: 11–10
Pts: Luvandwa 27; Rebs: Shani 13; Asts: Nyakweba 4		Pts: Vandell 21; Rebs: Jade, Vandell 10; Asts: Ornela 4

Pavilhão do Maxaquene, Maputo

25 September 2013
16:45

Boxscore

Cameroon	71–65	Nigeria
Scoring by quarter: 19–16, 16–18, 16–19, 20–10
Pts: Mbiandja 14; Rebs: Njonkou 12; Asts: Nimpa 9		Pts: Madu 15; Rebs: Omotola 8 Asts: Ukato 3

Pavilhão do Maxaquene, Maputo

25 September 2013
21:15

Boxscore

Angola	67–66 (OT)	Mali
Scoring by quarter: 11–20, 12–11, 19–9, 16–18, Overtime: 9–8
Pts: Tomas 16; Rebs: Nadir 10; Asts: four players 2		Pts: Tireira 29; Rebs: Coulibaly 10; Asts: Coulibaly 2

Pavilhão do Maxaquene, Maputo

== Knockout stage ==
=== Championship bracket ===
Quarter-finals
27 September
Mozambique	77
Nigeria	74
27 September
Cameroon	62
Ivory Coast	48
27 September
Senegal	67
Mali	44
27 September
Egypt	49
Angola	84

Semi-finals
28 September
Mozambique	61
Cameroon	57
28 September
Senegal	43
Angola	46

Final
29 September
Mozambique	61
Angola (OT)	64
Third place
29 September
Cameroon	53
Senegal	56

5th place bracket

Semi-finals
28 September
Nigeria	62
Ivory Coast	53
28 September
Mali	67
Egypt	54

Fifth place
29 September
Nigeria	50
Mali	57
Seventh place
29 September
Ivory Coast	61
Egypt	43

9th place bracket

Semi-finals
27 September
Cape Verde	65
Algeria	45
27 September
Zimbabwe	52
Kenya	63

Ninth place
28 September
Cape Verde	63
Kenya	41
Eleventh place
28 September
Algeria	74
Zimbabwe	59

=== Quarterfinals ===
27 September 2013
13:30

Boxscore

Ivory Coast	48–62	Cameroon
Scoring by quarter: 14–21, 7–13, 15–18, 12–10
Pts: Kouyaté 17; Rebs: Berte 3 Asts: three players 2		Pts: Gano 19; Rebs: Senken 6 Asts: Njonkou 5

Pavilhão do Maxaquene, Maputo

27 September 2013
15:45

Boxscore

Egypt	49–84	Angola
Scoring by quarter: 6–20, 11–15, 14–23, 18–26
Pts: Amer 15; Rebs: Afify, Amer 4 Asts: May Hussein, Reem 2		Pts: Felizarda, Nacissela 14; Rebs: Whitney 9 Asts: Clarisse 5

Pavilhão do Maxaquene, Maputo

27 September 2013
18:00

Boxscore

Nigeria	74–77	Mozambique
Scoring by quarter: 18–13, 10–24, 18–17, 28–23
Pts: Ogoke 25; Rebs: Madu 12; Asts: Ogunjimi 3		Pts: Clarisse 17; Rebs: Leia 13; Asts: Ngulela 7

Pavilhão do Maxaquene, Maputo

27 September 2013
20:15

Boxscore

Mali	44–67	Senegal
Scoring by quarter: 14–12, 7–20, 6–17, 17–18
Pts: Bagayoko 13; Rebs: Coulibaly 8 Asts: five players 1		Pts: As. Traoré 22; Rebs: As. Traoré 7 Asts: Sarr 4

Pavilhão do Maxaquene, Maputo

=== 9–12 place semifinals ===
27 September 2013
12:00

Boxscore

Cape Verde	65–45	Algeria
Scoring by quarter: 11–10, 10–7, 22–11, 22–17
Pts: Jade 21; Rebs: Vandell 11; Asts: Juvelina 2		Pts: Aissani 15; Rebs: Aissani 8 Asts: Belaidi 2

Pavilhão do Maxaquene, Maputo

27 September 2013
14:15

Boxscore

Zimbabwe	52–63	Kenya
Scoring by quarter: 11–13, 12–12, 14–20, 15–18
Pts: Sharon 18; Rebs: Marondera 8 Asts: Mabasa 3		Pts: Luvandwa 21; Rebs: Shani 8 Asts: Luvandwa, Shani 3

Pavilhão do Maxaquene, Maputo

=== 5–8th place semifinals ===
28 September 2013
14:30

Boxscore

Nigeria	62–53	Ivory Coast
Scoring by quarter: 10–12, 9–14, 26–15, 17–12
Pts: Atosu 12; Rebs: Madu 5 Asts: Atosu, Ogoke 3		Pts: Kouyaté 18; Rebs: Diabate, Berte 4 Asts: Berte, M. Meite 2

Pavilhão do Maxaquene, Maputo

28 September 2013
16:45

Boxscore

Egypt	54–67	Mali
Scoring by quarter: 9–21, 10–24, 15–11, 20–11
Pts: Awad 14; Rebs: Afify 8 Asts: Aliaa 5		Pts: Traoré 15; Rebs: Coulibaly 12; Asts: three players 3

Pavilhão do Maxaquene, Maputo

=== Semifinals ===
28 September 2013
18:00

Boxscore

Mozambique	61–57	Cameroon
Scoring by quarter: 9–23, 15–14, 13–8, 24–12
Pts: Leia 15; Rebs: Mafanela 8 Asts: Ngulela 4		Pts: Nimpa 18; Rebs: Gano 7 Asts: Gano 3

Pavilhão do Maxaquene, Maputo

28 September 2013
20:15

Boxscore

Angola	46–43	Senegal
Scoring by quarter: 9–11, 13–11, 8–17, 16–4
Pts: Nacissela 15; Rebs: Nacissela 5 Asts: Nadir 3		Pts: As.Traoré 15; Rebs: Diop 6 Asts: As.Traoré 2

Pavilhão do Maxaquene, Maputo

=== Eleventh place match ===
28 September 2013
10:00

Algeria	74–59	Zimbabwe
Scoring by quarter: 18–16, 16–12, 24–16, 16–15
Pts: Aissani 24; Rebs: Aissani 11; Asts: Belaidi 5		Pts: Sharon 17; Rebs: Chareka 6 Asts: Magwaro, Chareka 2

Pavilhão do Maxaquene, Maputo

=== Ninth place match ===
28 September 2013
12:15

Boxscore

Cape Verde	63–41	Kenya
Scoring by quarter: 26–7, 8–13, 17–7, 12–14
Pts: Ornela 20; Rebs: Ornela 7 Asts: Jade, Ornela 3		Pts: Okoth 12; Rebs: Shani 6 Asts: Luvandwa 3

Pavilhão do Maxaquene, Maputo

=== Seventh place match ===
29 September 2013
13:30

Boxscore

Ivory Coast	61–43	Egypt
Scoring by quarter: 10–12, 15–14, 21–10, 15–7
Pts: Kouyaté 26; Rebs: Kouyaté 5 Asts: Berte 6		Pts: Osama 11; Rebs: Afify 7 Asts: Aliaa 5

Pavilhão do Maxaquene, Maputo

=== Fifth place match ===
29 September 2013
11:00

Boxscore

Nigeria	50–57	Mali
Scoring by quarter: 10–9, 19–14, 7–20, 14–14
Pts: Ekworomadu 10; Rebs: Ogoke, Omotola 4 Asts: Ogunjimi, Ogoke 3		Pts: Tireira 26; Rebs: N.Coulibaly, Tireira 5 Asts: K.Coulibaly 2

Pavilhão do Maxaquene, Maputo

=== Bronze medal match ===
29 September 2013
15:30

Boxscore

Cameroon	53–56	Senegal
Scoring by quarter: 13–17, 10–11, 14–11, 16–17
Pts: Mbiandja 13; Rebs: Njonkou 7 Asts: Mbiandja, Nimpa 3		Pts: As.Traoré 14; Rebs: Sy 6 Asts: seven players 2

Pavilhão do Maxaquene, Maputo

=== Final ===
29 September 2013
18:30

Boxscore

Mozambique	61–64 (OT)	Angola
Scoring by quarter: 15–16, 14–15, 11–15, 14–8, Overtime: 7–10
Pts: Anabela 17; Rebs: Gimo 6 Asts: Ngulela 6		Pts: Luísa 17; Rebs: Nadir 7 Asts: Nacissela 4

Pavilhão do Maxaquene, Maputo

== Final standings ==
Qualified for the 2014 FIBA Women's World Cup

Rank	Team	Record
1st place, gold medalist(s)	Angola	8–0
2nd place, silver medalist(s)	Mozambique	7–1
3rd place, bronze medalist(s)	Senegal	6–2
4	Cameroon	5–3
5	Mali	5–3
6	Nigeria	3–5
7	Ivory Coast	4–4
8	Egypt	2–6
9	Cape Verde	2–5
10	Kenya	2–5
11	Algeria	2–5
12	Zimbabwe	0–7

Angola roster
Astrida Vicente, Catarina Camufal, Clarisse Mpaka, Felizarda Jorge, Fineza Eusébio, Luísa Tomás, Madalena Felix, Nacissela Maurício, Nadir Manuel, Ngiendula Filipe, Sónia Guadalupe, Whitney Miguel, Coach: Aníbal Moreira

== Awards ==
2013 FIBA Africa Championship for Women winners

Angola
Second title

Most Valuable Player
(Angola) Nacissela Maurício

=== All-Tournament Team ===
- (Mozambique) Deolinda Ngulela
- (Cameroon) Ramses Lonlack
- (Angola) Nacissela Maurício
- (Mozambique) Leia Dongue
- (Senegal) Astou Traoré

== Statistical leaders ==
=== Individual Tournament Highs ===
Points

Rank	Name	G	Pts	PPG
1	(Zimbabwe) Sharon Chamwarura	7	117	16.7
2	(Senegal) Astou Traore	8	133	16.6
3	(Ivory Coast) Kani Kouyate	8	119	14.9
4	(Mozambique) Leia Dongue	8	114	14.3
5	(Cape Verde) Jade Leitão	7	99	14.1
6	(Mozambique) Clarisse Machanguana	8	103	12.9
7	(Egypt) Menatalla Awad	8	102	12.8
8	(Cape Verde) Vandell Andrade	7	87	12.4
9	(Zimbabwe) Dorcas Marondera	7	86	12.3
10	(Angola) Nacissela Maurício	8	97	12.1

Rebounds

Rank	Name	G	Rbs	RPG
1	(Mali) Naignouma Coulibaly	8	74	9.2
2	(Mozambique) Leia Dongue	8	64	8
3	(Cape Verde) Vandell Andrade	7	52	7.4
3	(Kenya) Silalei Shani	7	52	7.4
5	(Kenya) Purity Auma	7	51	7.3
6	(Angola) Nadir Manuel	8	55	6.9
7	(Algeria) Nesrine Taïbi	6	39	6.5
8	(Angola) Nacissela Maurício	8	49	6.1
9	(Nigeria) Ndidi Madu	8	48	6
10	(Cameroon) Amina Njonkou	8	45	5.6

Assists

Rank	Name	G	Ast	APG
1	(Mozambique) Deolinda Ngulela	8	43	5.4
2	(Egypt) Aliaa Gamal	8	25	3.1
3	(Senegal) Fatou Dieng	8	24	3
3	(Mozambique) Valerdina Manhonga	8	24	3
5	(Cameroon) Ramses Nimpa	8	23	2.9
6	(Angola) Nacissela Maurício	8	22	2.8
7	(Senegal) Mame Diodio Diouf	5	14	2.8
8	(Ivory Coast) Kani Kouyate	8	20	2.5
9	(Algeria) Rachida Belaidi	7	17	2.4
10	(Cameroon) Priscilla Mbiandja	8	18	2.3

Steals

Rank	Name	G	Stl	SPG
1	(Cape Verde) Vandell Andrade	7	27	3.9
2	(Zimbabwe) Sharon Chamwarura	7	25	3.6
2	(Kenya) Hilda Luvandwa	7	25	3.6
4	(Cameroon) Ramses Nimpa	8	25	3.1
4	(Cameroon) Priscilla Mbiandja	8	25	3.1
6	(Ivory Coast) Kani Kouyate	8	23	2.9
6	(Senegal) Mame Marie Sy	8	23	2.9
8	(Ivory Coast) Kariata Diaby	8	22	2.8
8	(Angola) Nacissela Maurício	8	22	2.8
10	(Zimbabwe) Dorcas Marondera	7	19	2.7

Blocks

Rank	Name	G	Blk	BPG
1	(Ivory Coast) Kariata Diaby	8	3	0.4
1	(Angola) Nadir Manuel	8	3	0.4
1	(Senegal) Mame Marie Sy	8	3	0.4
4	(Egypt) Aliaa Gamal	8	2	0.2
4	(Mozambique) Clarisse Machanguana	8	2	0.2
6	(Egypt) May Helwa	6	1	0.2
7	(Egypt) Engy Afifi	8	1	0.1
7	(Kenya) Purity Auma	8	1	0.1
7	(Ivory Coast) Saran Camara	8	1	0.1
7	(Mali) Kankou Coulibaly	8	1	0.1

Turnovers

Rank	Name	G	TOs	TPG
1	(Zimbabwe) Dorcas Marondera	7	67	9.6
2	(Kenya) Purity Auma	7	45	6.4
3	(Cape Verde) Ornela Livramento	7	43	6.1
4	(Kenya) Hilda Luvandwa	7	41	5.9
5	(Cape Verde) Jade Leitão	7	40	5.7
6	(Cameroon) Priscilla Mbiandja	8	38	4.8
6	(Egypt) Reem Osama	8	38	4.8
8	(Algeria) Wahiba Aissani	7	32	4.6
8	(Zimbabwe) Sharon Chamwarura	7	32	4.6
8	(Zimbabwe) Fadzai Masaba	7	32	4.6

2-point field goal percentage

Rank	Name	G	A	M	2P%
1	(Senegal) Astou Traore	8	52	37	71.2
2	(Angola) Nadir Manuel	8	52	36	69.2
3	(Mozambique) Leia Dongue	8	65	44	67.7
4	(Cape Verde) Vandell Andrade	7	44	29	65.9
5	(Egypt) Menatalla Awad	8	65	38	58.5
6	(Mozambique) C. Machanguana	8	68	39	57.4
7	(Nigeria) Ndidi Madu	8	53	30	56.6
8	(Angola) Luísa Tomás	8	53	28	52.8
9	(Kenya) Silalei Shani	7	54	28	51.9
10	(Cameroon) Amina Njonkou	8	56	28	50

3-point field goal percentage

Rank	Name	G	A	M	3P%
1	(Senegal) Astou Traore	8	18	11	61.1
2	(Cameroon) Astride Njiogap	8	21	11	52.4
3	(Mali) Fatoumata Bagayoko	8	31	16	51.6
4	(Egypt) Reem Osama	8	20	10	50
5	(Mozambique) Deolinda Ngulela	8	23	11	47.8
6	(Senegal) Oumoul Thiam	8	24	11	45.8
7	(Zimbabwe) Sharon Chamwarura	7	29	12	41.4
8	(Senegal) Mame Diodio Diouf	5	18	7	38.9
9	(Senegal) Ndèye Sène	8	29	11	37.9
10	(Angola) Fineza Eusébio	8	16	6	37.5

Free throw percentage

Rank	Name	G	A	M	FT%
1	(Mali) Meiya Tirera	8	40	34	85
2	(Senegal) Mame Marie Sy	8	29	24	82.8
3	(Mozambique) Anabela Cossa	8	27	22	81.5
4	(Angola) Nacissela Maurício	8	37	30	81.1
5	(Algeria) Wahiba Aissani	7	26	20	76.9
6	(Mali) Kankou Coulibaly	8	33	25	75.8
7	(Cameroon) Priscilla Mbiandja	8	49	37	75.5
8	(Cape Verde) Ornela Livramento	7	32	24	75
9	(Egypt) Reem Osama	8	50	37	74
10	(Mozambique) Deolinda Ngulela	8	27	19	70.4

=== Individual Game Highs ===
Department	Name	Total	Opponent
Points	(Mali) Meiya Tirera	29	Angola
Rebounds	(Mali) Naignouma Coulibaly	15	Kenya
Assists	(Mozambique) Deolinda Ngulela	13	Zimbabwe
Steals	(Cape Verde) Vandell Andrade	8	Kenya
Blocks	(Angola) Nadir Manuel	2	Kenya
2-point field goal percentage	(Mali) Djene Diawara	100% (9/9)	Cape Verde
3-point field goal percentage	(Senegal) Oumoul Thiam	100% (4/4)	Egypt
Free throw percentage	(Mali) Meiya Tirera	100% (10/10)	Nigeria
Turnovers	(Zimbabwe) Dorcas Marondera	14	Mozambique

=== Team Tournament Highs ===
Points per Game

Rank	Name	G	Pts	PPG
1	Mozambique	8	621	77.6
2	Senegal	8	602	75.3
3	Mali	8	512	64
4	Angola	8	490	61.3
5	Egypt	8	479	59.9
6	Cameroon	8	477	59.6
7	Nigeria	8	476	59.5
8	Cape Verde	7	398	56.9
9	Ivory Coast	8	432	54
10	Algeria	7	358	51.1

Rebounds

Rank	Name	G	Rbs	RPG
1	Mozambique	8	266	33.2
2	Cape Verde	7	221	31.6
3	Kenya	7	205	29.3
4	Algeria	7	200	28.6
5	Cameroon	8	227	28.4
6	Angola	8	226	28.2
7	Senegal	8	224	28
8	Zimbabwe	7	195	27.9
9	Mali	8	214	26.8
10	Nigeria	8	212	26.5

Assists

Rank	Name	G	Ast	APG
1	Mozambique	8	127	15.9
2	Senegal	8	113	14.1
3	Angola	8	78	9.8
4	Ivory Coast	8	78	9.8
5	Cameroon	8	76	9.5
6	Algeria	7	63	9
7	Egypt	8	66	8.3
8	Mali	8	66	8.3
9	Nigeria	8	62	7.8
10	Kenya	7	54	7.7

Steals

Rank	Name	G	Sts	SPG
1	Ivory Coast	8	136	17
2	Mozambique	8	131	16.4
3	Senegal	8	126	15.8
4	Angola	8	117	14.6
5	Cape Verde	7	102	14.6
6	Zimbabwe	7	100	14.3
7	Cameroon	8	110	13.8
8	Kenya	7	94	13.8
9	Egypt	8	102	12.8
10	Mali	8	96	12

Blocks

Rank	Name	G	Bks	BPG
1	Ivory Coast	8	6	0.8
2	Senegal	8	6	0.8
3	Angola	8	5	0.6
4	Egypt	8	4	0.5
5	Mali	8	3	0.4
6	Mozambique	8	3	0.4
7	Cape Verde	7	2	0.3
8	Kenya	7	2	0.3
9	Nigeria	8	2	0.2
10	Algeria	7	1	0.1

Turnovers

Rank	Name	G	TOs	TPG
1	Zimbabwe	7	251	35.9
2	Ivory Coast	8	247	30.9
3	Kenya	7	216	30.9
4	Egypt	8	230	28.8
5	Cape Verde	7	194	27.7
6	Cameroon	8	216	27
7	Algeria	7	177	25.3
8	Mozambique	8	200	25
9	Angola	8	192	24
10	Nigeria	8	183	22.9

2-point field goal percentage

Rank	Name	G	A	M	2P%
1	Senegal	8	279	171	61.3
2	Egypt	8	256	141	55.1
3	Mali	8	270	148	54.8
4	Mozambique	8	312	171	54.8
5	Nigeria	8	272	146	53.7
6	Angola	8	283	149	52.7
7	Ivory Coast	8	288	143	49.7
8	Cameroon	8	289	140	48.4
9	Kenya	7	245	118	48.2
10	Algeria	7	203	94	46.3

3-point field goal percentage

Rank	Name	G	A	M	3P%
1	Senegal	8	133	50	37.6
2	Cameroon	8	67	25	37.3
3	Mozambique	8	129	46	35.7
4	Mali	8	84	29	34.5
5	Nigeria	8	80	24	30
6	Egypt	8	86	25	29.1
7	Angola	8	98	28	28.6
8	Zimbabwe	7	76	20	26.3
9	Algeria	7	127	32	25.2
10	Cape Verde	7	109	26	23.9

Free throw percentage

Rank	Name	G	A	M	FT%
1	Senegal	8	156	110	70.5
2	Nigeria	8	165	112	67.9
3	Mali	8	191	129	67.5
4	Cameroon	8	186	122	65.6
5	Ivory Coast	8	151	98	64.9
6	Mozambique	8	220	141	64.1
7	Egypt	8	192	122	63.5
8	Angola	8	173	108	62.4
9	Cape Verde	7	189	112	59.3
10	Zimbabwe	7	186	105	56.5

=== Team Game highs ===
Department	Name	Total	Opponent
Points	Senegal	123	Zimbabwe
Rebounds	Cape Verde	53	Algeria
Assists	Mozambique	29	Zimbabwe
Steals	Ivory Coast	29	Zimbabwe
Blocks	six teams	2	
2-point field goal percentage	Mali	88.2% (15/17)	Cape Verde
3-point field goal percentage	Nigeria	75% (3/4)	Mali
Free throw percentage	Senegal	84.2% (16/19)	Mozambique
Turnovers	Zimbabwe	49	Mozambique

== See also ==
- 2013 FIBA Africa Women's Clubs Champions Cup
