= Cameroon national basketball team =

Cameroon national basketball team may refer to:

- Cameroon men's national basketball team
- Cameroon women's national basketball team
