= Whitney Miguel =

Angolan and French basketball player (born 1991)

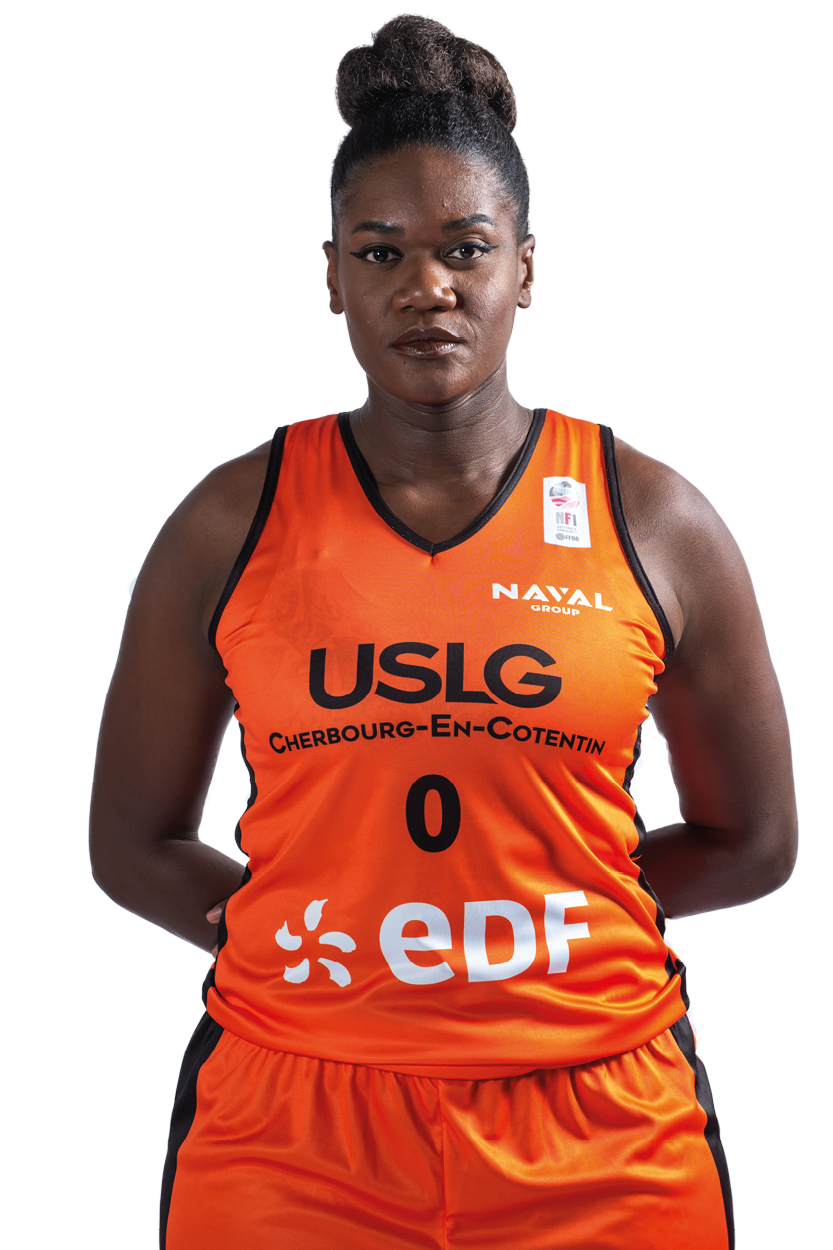

Personal information
- National team: Angola
- Born: Créteil, France; 30 September 1991 (age 35)
- Height: 185 cm (6 ft 1 in)

Sport
- Sport: Basketball
- Position: Power forward
- Club: US La Glacerie

Whitney Miguel (born 30 September 1991) is an Angolan and French basketball player who plays as power forward. She played for the Angola women's national basketball team.

== Biography ==
Miguel was born on 30 September 1991 and left Angola at a young age to live in France.

In the 2012-2013 season, Miguel joined Landerneau Bretagne Basket of the Ligue Feminine de Basketball 2.

Miguel debuted for the Angola women's national basketball team at the 2013 FIBA Africa Championship for Women, The team won gold with 64-61 points.

Miguel did not play for Angola at the 2015 FIBA Africa Championship for Women, but returned to the Angolan national women's squad for the 2017 edition and 2021 edition of AfroBasket Women.

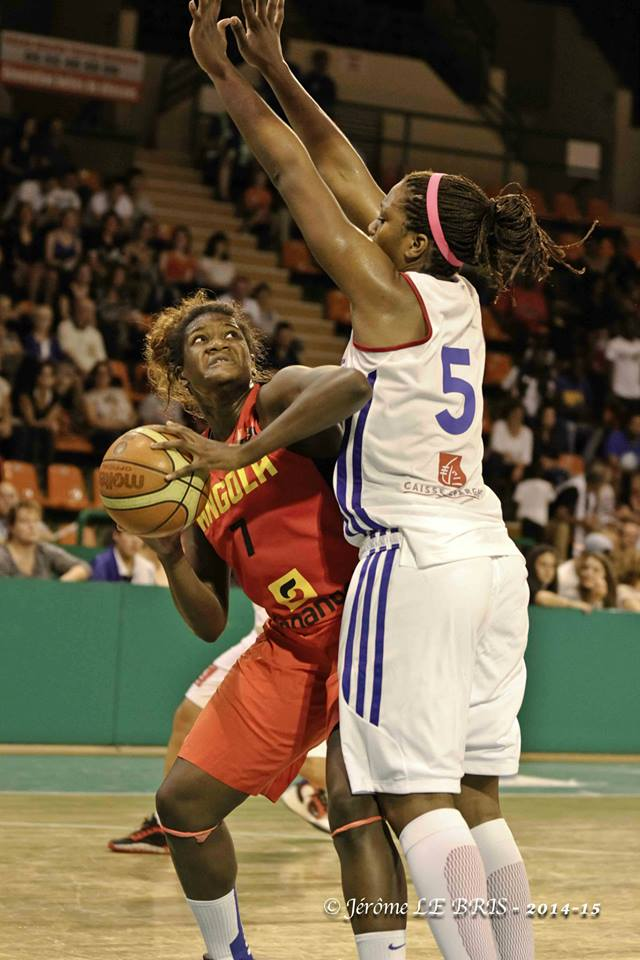
Miguel playing for Angola against the France women's national basketball team in 2021

== Clubs ==
- 2007-2009: Stade Clermontois Auvergne Basket 63
- 2009-2010: Challes-les-Eaux Basketball [fr]
- 2010-2011: Avenir de Rennes [fr]
- 2011-2012: AL Aplemont Le Havre [fr]
- 2012-2015: Landerneau Bretagne Basket
- 2015-2016: Le Creusot
- 2016-2017: Roannais Basket Féminin [fr]
- 2017-2019: Saint Delphin Basket Villenave d'Ornon
- 2019-2020: Sainte Savine Basketball
- 2020-: Union Sportive La Glacerie
