= Liberia women's national under-18 basketball team =

Liberia
- FIBA zone: FIBA Africa

World Championships for Women
- Appearances: None

African Championships for Women
- Appearances: None

The Liberia women's national under-18 basketball team is a national basketball team of Liberia, administered by the Liberia Basketball Federation. It represents the country in international under-18 (under age 18) women's basketball competitions.

It appeared at the 2010 FIBA Africa Under-18 Championship for Women qualification stage.

== See also ==
- Liberia women's national basketball team
- Liberia men's national under-18 basketball team
