= Nedu Onyeuku =

Nigerian basketball player

Chinedu Onyeuku
Personal information
- Born: 5 November 1983 Lagos, Nigeria
- Died: 21 November 2012
- Listed height: 6 ft 3 in (1.91 m)
- Listed weight: 185 lb (84 kg)

Career information
- High school: Creighton Prep (Omaha, Nebraska)
- College: Iowa Western CC (2002–2004); Illinois State (2004–2006)
- NBA draft: 2006: undrafted
- Playing career: 2006–2010
- Position: Shooting guard

Career history
- 2007–2008: Bayern Munich
- 2009: San Antonio Stars
- 2009–2010: Texas Chaparrals
- 2010: Irving Assault
- 2010: Arlington Bulldogs
Medals
Men's basketball
Representing Nigeria
African Championships
Bronze medal – third place	2011 Madagascar	Nigeria

Chinedu Onyeuku was a Nigerian professional basketball player with the ABA team Arlington Bulldogs. After a successful College career, Onyeuku spent one year playing professional basketball in Germany for Bayern Munich before returning to the United States.

On 21 November 2012 the 29-year-old Onyeuku — once a star at Omaha Creighton Prep —died when a homeowner shot at two men trying to break into his Plano, Tex., house.

Rumors immediately surfaced in Omaha that Valentine was the second burglar — and that his relatives had driven to Texas to return him back to Omaha.

Then, on April 9, Valentine called his probation officer. According to a court document filed last week, Valentine told the probation officer that he “went to Plano, Texas, and his intention was to do a home invasion — the plan was to rob a known drug dealer.”

“Subsequently, a homicide took place,” according to the court document filed by prosecutor Bill Ouren. Under terms of his probation, Valentine was not to leave Douglas County without permission.

Valentine, 25, now is in the Douglas County Jail. If convicted of the probation violation, he would face up to five years in prison — the maximum sentence on his original drug dealing charge.

Meanwhile, the investigation into Onyeuku's death continues.

== Biography ==
Chinedu immigrated to America from Lagos in 1989. He attended Illinois State University where he played for his first basketball team called the Arlington Bulldogs. Onyeku played for the D’Tigers in 2009 and his national team several times but didn't play for the London Olympic Games in 2012.

== Achievements ==
=== Individual ===
- 2004: Iowa Western Community College - All-NEC 1st team
- 2004: Iowa Western Community College - NEC player of the year
- 2009: Nigeria national basketball team
