= Basketball at the 2015 African Games =

African Games Basketball Tournament
- Brazzaville 2015

Tournament details
- Games: 2015 African Games
- Host nation: Republic of the Congo
- City: Brazzaville
- Duration: 9 – 18 September

Men's tournament
- Teams: 12
Medals
Gold medalists	Angola
Silver medalists	Egypt
Bronze medalists	Nigeria

Women's tournament
- Teams: 12
Medals
Gold medalists	Mali
Silver medalists	Nigeria
Bronze medalists	Angola

Official website
- www.cojabrazzaville2015.com

Tournaments
← Maputo 2011	2019 →

The Basketball tournament at the 2015 African Games was held from September 9–18, 2015 at several venues.

== Competition format ==
The teams with the four best records qualified for the knockout stage, which was a single-elimination tournament. The semifinal winners contested for the gold medal, while the losers played for the bronze medal.

=== Calendar ===
P	Preliminaries	¼	Quarterfinals	½	Semifinals	F	Final

Event↓/Date →	Wed 9 Sep	The 10 Sep	Fri 11 Sep	Sat 12 Sep	Sun 13 Sep	Mon 14 Sep	Tue 15 Sep	Wed 16 Sep	The 17 Sep	Fri 18 Sep
Men	P	P	P	P	P	P		½		F
Women	P	P	P	P	P	P	¼		½	F

=== Men's competition ===
Group A	Group B
Angola; Congo; Cape Verde; Egypt; Gabon; Seychelles	Algeria; Cameroon; Ivory Coast; Mali; Mozambique; Nigeria

=== Women's competition ===
Group A	Group B
Congo; Madagascar; Mali; Mozambique; Nigeria; Uganda	Algeria; Angola; Gabon; Ivory Coast; Senegal; South Africa

== Medals table ==
Rank	Nation	Gold	Silver	Bronze	Total
1	Angola (ANG)	1	0	1	2
2	Mali (MLI)	1	0	0	1
3	Nigeria (NGR)	0	1	1	2
4	Egypt (EGY)	0	1	0	1
Totals (4 entries)		2	2	2	6

=== Medal summary ===
Event	Gold	Silver	Bronze
Men	Angola	Egypt	Nigeria
Women	Mali	Nigeria	Angola
