= Basketball at the 1999 All-Africa Games =

- League: All Africa Games
- Sport: Basketball
- Duration: 11 – 18 September 1999
- Teams: 6
- Medallists: Egypt (M); Angola; Nigeria; Senegal (W); DR Congo; Nigeria

All-Africa Games Basketball seasons
- ← 1995 2003 →

The Basketball tournament at the 1999 All-Africa Games was held in Johannesburg, South Africa from 11 to 18 September 1999. The winners were Egypt won the men's tournament and Senegal won the women's tournament, both ended the round robin tournament with a 5–0 unbeaten record.

== Competition format ==
A round-robin tournament was played.

=== Calendar ===
Day 1 - 11/12 Sep	Day 2 - 13 Sep	Day 3 - 14 Sep	Day 4 - 17 Sep	Day 5 - 18 Sep

Event↓/Date →	Sat 11	Sun 12	Mon 13	Tue 14	Fri 17	Sat 18
Men	Day 1	Day 1	Day 2	Day 3	Day 4	Day 5
Women	Day 1	Day 1	Day 2	Day 3	Day 4	Day 5

=== Men's competition ===
Team

Angola
Cameroon
Egypt
Nigeria
Senegal
South Africa

=== Women's competition ===
Team

DR Congo
Mozambique
Nigeria
Senegal
South Africa
Tunisia

== Medal summary ==
=== Medal table ===
Rank	Nation	Gold	Silver	Bronze	Total
1	Egypt (EGY)	2	0	0	2
1	Senegal (SEN)	2	0	0	2
3	Angola (ANG)	0	2	0	2
3	Democratic Republic of the Congo (COD)	0	2	0	2
5	Nigeria (NGR)	0	0	2	2
Totals (5 entries)		4	4	2	10

=== Events ===
Event	Gold	Silver	Bronze
Men	Egypt	Angola	Nigeria
Women	Senegal	(Democratic Republic of the Congo) DR Congo	Nigeria

== Final standings ==
Rank	Men							Women						
Rank	Team	Pld	W	L	PF	PA	PD	Team	Pld	W	L	PF	PA	PD
1st place, gold medalist(s)	Egypt	5	5	0	437	352	+85	Senegal	5	5	0	411	324	+87
2nd place, silver medalist(s)	Angola	5	4	1	398	358	+40	DR Congo	5	4	1	396	285	+111
3rd place, bronze medalist(s)	Nigeria	5	3	2	439	386	+53	Nigeria	5	2	3	427	372	+55
4.	Cameroon	5	1	4	378	417	−39	Tunisia	5	2	3	359	363	−4
5.	Senegal	5	1	4	336	391	−55	Mozambique	5	2	3	299	366	−67
6.	South Africa	5	1	4	337	421	−84	South Africa	5	0	5	254	436	−182
