= Linda Ogugua =

Nigerian basketball player

Linda Ogugua (born 12 April 1978) is a Nigerian women's basketball center. Ogugua attended Biola University in California, United States and played with the Nigeria women's national basketball team at the 2004 Summer Olympics.

== Personal ==
Ogugua was born to Caroline Chinwe and John Brown Ogugua in Anambra State, Nigeria on 12 April 1978.
