= Basketball at the 2003 All-Africa Games =

- League: All Africa Games
- Sport: Basketball
- Duration: October 5 – 10, 2003
- Teams: 4 / 6
- Medallists: Angola (M); Senegal; Nigeria; Nigeria (W); DR Congo; Senegal

All-Africa Games Basketball seasons
- ← 1999 2007 →

The Basketball tournament at the 2003 All-Africa Games was held in Abuja, Nigeria from October 5 to 10. Angola won the men's tournament and ended the round robin tournament with a 3–0 unbeaten record. Nigeria won the women's tournament.

== Competition format ==
A round-robin tournament was played.

=== Calendar ===
Day 1	Day 2	Day 3	Day 4	Day 5

Event↓/Date →	Sun 05	Mon 06	Tue 07	Wed 08	Thu 09	Fri 10
Men	Day 1			Day 2		Day 3
Women	Day 1	Day 2	Day 3		Day 4	Day 5

=== Men's competition ===
Team

Angola
Ivory Coast
Nigeria
Senegal

=== Women's competition ===
Team

Angola
DR Congo
Ivory Coast
Kenya
Nigeria
Senegal

== Medal summary ==
=== Medal table ===
Rank	Nation	Gold	Silver	Bronze	Total
1	Nigeria (NGR)	1	0	1	2
2	Angola (ANG)	1	0	0	1
3	Senegal (SEN)	0	1	1	2
4	DR Congo (COD)	0	1	0	1
Totals (4 entries)		2	2	2	6

=== Events ===
Event	Gold	Silver	Bronze
Men	Angola Abdel Bouckar; Afonso Silva; Eduardo Mingas; Gerson Monteiro; Helder Domingos; Idelfonso Kiteculo; José Nascimento; Milton Barros; Olímpio Cipriano; Simão Panzo; Victor Muzadi; Walter Costa; Coach: Jaime Covilhã	Senegal Abdoulaye Sow; Alpha Traore; Arfang S. Ueye; Charles Dieng; El Hadji Diakhat; El Kabir Pene; Elyse G. Voissy; Makha Konate M. Massaer M. Gning; Samba Fall; Serigne Saliou Fall; Souleymane Sall; Coach:	Nigeria Adamy Musa; Adeshola Alayande; Alonna Ejike; Bemoite Suobo; Godwin Unegbe; John Allagh; Mohammed Abdulrahman; Mustapha Abdulsalam; Odaudu Ogoh; Priwit Gagara; Synesius Boniface; Vicent Okotie; Coach:
Women	Nigeria Aisha Mohammed; Alaba Rafiu; Bola Solaja; Ezinne James; Funmilayo Ojelabi; Juliana Negedu; Mactabene Amachree; Mary Chinweokwu; Mfon Udoka; Nguveren Ivorhe; Patricia Chukwuma; Shola Ogunade; Coach:	(Democratic Republic of the Congo) DR Congo Ana Jkano; Kitoko Mboma; Koko Mbudi; Mangole Awaka; Mangongo Boboli; Mireille Tangama; Musau Kalundu; Mwadi Mabika; Ohandjo Odimba; Pauline Nsimbo; Rosada Ilda; Coach:	Senegal Anta Sy; Aminara Diop; Aminata N. Diop; Awa Gueye; Coumba Cisse; Fatou Balayara; Fama Fall; Khadiata Diop; Khady Dieje; Adama Diakhate; Jeanne Senghor; Salimata Diatta; Coach:

== Final standings ==
Rank	Men				Women			
Rank	Team	Pld	W	L	Team	Pld	W	L
1st place, gold medalist(s)	Angola	3	3	0	Nigeria	5	4	1
2nd place, silver medalist(s)	Senegal	3	2	1	DR Congo	5	4	1
3rd place, bronze medalist(s)	Nigeria	3	1	2	Senegal	5	3	2
4.	Ivory Coast	3	0	3	Angola	5	3	2
5.					Kenya	5	1	4
6.					Ivory Coast	5	0	5
