= FIBA Africa Championship 1983 =

1983 FIBA AfroBasket
12th FIBA African Basketball Championship

Tournament details
- Host country: Egypt
- Dates: December 19–28
- Teams: 10 (from 40 federations)
- Venue: 1 (in 1 host city)

Final positions
- Champions: Egypt (5th title)

The FIBA Africa Championship 1983 was hosted by Egypt from December 19 to December 28, 1983. The games were played in Alexandria. Egypt won the tournament, its fifth African Championship, to qualify for the 1984 Summer Olympics in Los Angeles.

== Competing nations ==
The following national teams competed:

Group A	Group B
Algeria; Angola; Central African Republic; Egypt; Liberia	Ivory Coast; Guinea; Mozambique; Senegal; Somalia

== Preliminary rounds ==
=== Group A ===
Team	Pts	Pld	W	L	PF	PA	Diff
Egypt	8	4	4	0	341	275	+66
Angola	6	4	2	2	314	288	+26
Algeria	6	4	2	2	275	284	-9
Central African Republic	6	4	2	2	313	297	+16
Liberia	4	4	0	4	269	368	-99

Day 1

Egypt	85–64	Algeria
Central African Republic	97–74	Liberia

Day 2

Central African Republic	66–74	Algeria
Angola	72–79	Egypt

Day 3

Liberia	69–106	Egypt
Angola	71–65	Algeria

Day 4

Angola	93–64	Liberia
Central African Republic	70–71	Egypt

Day 5

Algeria	72–62	Liberia
Central African Republic	80–78	Angola

=== Group B ===
Team	Pts	Pld	W	L	PF	PA	Diff
Senegal	8	4	4	0	318	225	+93
Ivory Coast	7	4	3	1	335	247	+88
Mozambique	6	4	2	2	304	227	+77
Somalia	5	4	1	3	257	346	-89
Guinea	4	4	0	4	232	401	-169

Day 1

Mozambique	106–38	Guinea
Senegal	70–66	Ivory Coast

Day 2

Somalia	94–73	Guinea
Ivory Coast	80–66	Mozambique

Day 3

Senegal	54–41	Mozambique
Ivory Coast	90–56	Somalia

Day 4

Ivory Coast	99–55	Guinea
Senegal	92–52	Somalia

Day 5

Mozambique	91–55	Somalia
Senegal	102–66	Guinea

== Knockout stage ==
Semi-finals
December 27, 1983
Egypt	84
Ivory Coast	68
December 27, 1983
Senegal	61
Angola	68

Final
December 28, 1983
Egypt	94
Angola	68
Third place
December 28, 1983
Ivory Coast	71
Senegal	78

== Classification Stage ==
Liberia	93–92	Guinea
Somalia	64–93	Central African Republic
Algeria	62–68	Mozambique

== Final standings ==
Rank	Team	Record
1	Egypt	6–0
2	Angola	3-3
3	Senegal	5–1
4	Ivory Coast	3-3
5	Mozambique	3–2
6	Algeria	2–3
7	Central African Republic	3–2
8	Somalia	1–4
9	Liberia	1–4
10	Guinea	0–5

Egypt qualified for the 1984 Summer Olympics.
