= Patrick Fitzpatrick =

Irish republican and politician

Chair of Gorey Rural District Council
- In office June 1920 – June 1921
- Preceded by: Owen Kehoe
- Succeeded by: (resigned; position left vacant until next election)

Personal details
- Born: 1896 Kiltealy, County Wexford, Ireland
- Died: 14 August 1962 (aged 65–66) River Shannon near Limerick, Ireland
- Party: Sinn Féin

Military service
- Allegiance: Irish Republican Army
- Battles/wars: Irish War of Independence; Irish Civil War

Patrick Fitzpatrick (1896 – 14 August 1962) was an Irish republican and local politician from Gorey, County Wexford. He gained notoriety for his refusal to recognise the legitimacy of British courts in 1919 and went on to serve as chair of the Gorey Rural District Council in 1920.

== Early life ==
Patrick Fitzpatrick was born in 1896 in Kiltealy, County Wexford, to John Fitzpatrick, a national school principal, and Jane Fitzpatrick (née Doyle). He later moved to Gorey, where he worked as a rate collector and became involved with the local unit of the Irish Republican Army, eventually being appointed its captain.

== IRA involvement and 1919 arrest ==
On the 15th of December 1919, Fitzpatrick was arrested and brought before a Wexford petty sessions court on a charge of possessing seditious documents. He refused to recognise the court’s authority, ignored an order to pay a £50 fine, and rejected a binding to keep the peace, citing political principles. In April 1920, during the burning of the RIC barracks at Courtown, he was wounded in the eye.

== Political career ==
At the June 1920 local elections, Fitzpatrick ran as a Sinn Féin candidate and was elected chair of the Gorey Rural District Council. One of his first acts was to formally acknowledge the authority of Dáil Éireann, replacing British governance in council affairs. Fitzpatrick’s predecessor was Owen Kehoe.

After a civilian was shot in Gorey in January 1921, Fitzpatrick went on the run and joined the North Wexford Active Service Unit of the IRA. In June 1921 he tendered his resignation as district councillor and poor law guardian, and the council, expressing “very great regret,” accepted it in September.

== Irish Civil War and later life ==
During the Irish Civil War, Fitzpatrick served as adjutant for the North Wexford Brigade of anti-Treaty forces. He was captured in October 1922 and interned in Enniscorthy Castle, Wicklow, and Wexford Gaols. He escaped in November 1922 but was recaptured in January 1923. He remained interned until December 1923.

After his release, he returned to work as a rate collector in Gorey until resigning in 1928. He later moved to Limerick, enlisted in the Irish Army Medical Service as sergeant major, and worked as a customs and excise watcher. Fitzpatrick drowned in the River Shannon near Limerick on 14 August 1962.

== Autograph book ==
Starting with his time incarcerated in Wicklow Gaol, Fitzpatrick created an Autograph book of the various fellow internees from Fitzpatrick’s time in both places of detention. There are contributions from 43 fellow prisoners, many of whom have included a quotation, verse, drawing, sketch, or political statement. Fitzpatrick’s comrades hail from counties Wicklow, Wexford, Carlow, Kildare, Dublin and Westmeath.
