= Liberia women's national basketball team =

Liberia
- FIBA ranking: NR (18 March 2026)
- Joined FIBA: 1966
- FIBA zone: FIBA Africa
- National federation: LBF

Olympic Games
- Appearances: None

World Cup
- Appearances: None

FIBA Africa Championship for Women
- Appearances: None
Home	Away

The Liberia women's national basketball team is the national basketball team representing Liberia. It is administered by the Liberia Basketball Federation.

It appeared at the 2005 FIBA Africa Championship for Women qualification stage.

== See also ==
- Liberia women's national under-19 basketball team
- Liberia women's national under-17 basketball team
- Liberia women's national 3x3 team
