= Ayo Bakare =

Nigerian professional basketball coach

Ebun Comets
- Position: Head coach
- League: Nigerian Premier League

Personal information
- Born: 20 March 1960 (age 66) Enugu, Nigeria

Career history

Coaching
- 1998–present: Ebun Comets

Ayodele "Ayo" Bakare (born 20 March 1960) is a Nigerian professional basketball coach. He is the current head coach of Ebun Comets and has coached Nigeria several years.

== Club coaching career ==
Bakare has been the head coach of the Ebun Comets in the Nigerian Premier League.

== Nigerian national team coaching career ==
Bakare was the former head coach of the senior men's Nigerian national basketball team. His Nigerian team qualified and competed at the 2012 Summer Olympics. He resigned has the teams Technical Director in 2014.
