= Aïda Fall =

French-Senegalese basketball player

No. 15 – Hainaut
- Position: Center
- League: LFB

Personal information
- Born: 10 November 1986 (age 40) Les Pavillons-sous-Bois, France
- Listed height: 1.93 m (6 ft 4 in)
- Listed weight: 95 kg (209 lb)

Career information
- WNBA draft: 2008: undrafted

Aïda Fall (born 10 November 1986) is a French-Senegalese basketball player for Hainaut.
