= Liberia men's national basketball team =

Liberia
- FIBA ranking: NR (1 September 2026)
- Joined FIBA: 1964
- FIBA zone: FIBA Africa
- National federation: LBF
- Coach: Adam Sackor

Olympic Games
- Appearances: None

FIBA World Cup
- Appearances: None

FIBA Africa Championship
- Appearances: 2 (1983, 2007)
- Medals: None
Home	Away

The Liberia national basketball team is the national basketball team representing Liberia. It is administered by the Liberia Basketball Federation. Its last qualification to the FIBA Africa Championship dates back to 2007. Its most noteworthy international performance was in 1983 when Liberia finished among Africa's 10 elite basketball teams. According to the website, Afrobasket.com, the Liberia National Basketball team has not been in existence since 2013.

== History ==
Basketball in Liberia began to grow in popularity during the 1960s and 1970s, particularly in Monrovia, where local leagues and school tournaments helped establish the sport. The national team made its first appearances in international competition under the banner of FIBA Africa during the late 1970s.

Liberia’s most notable participation came in the FIBA Africa Championship 1983, held in Cairo, Egypt. The tournament marked the country’s debut on the continental stage, and although Liberia did not advance past the early rounds, the event provided valuable experience and exposure for Liberian basketball players.

During the civil conflicts of the 1990s and early 2000s, basketball activity in Liberia was severely disrupted, with many domestic competitions suspended and the national team unable to regularly compete in qualifiers.

In the post-war period, the Liberia Basketball Federation (LBF) focused on rebuilding the sport through grassroots development, organizing the national league in Monrovia and restarting youth programs. Although the senior men’s national team has yet to re-establish itself as a regular participant in the AfroBasket tournament, Liberia continues to take part in regional competitions and FIBA Africa qualifiers, with the long-term goal of returning to continental prominence.

== Current squad ==
Team for the AfroBasket 2007. (last publicized squad)

Liberia men's national basketball team roster
Players
Coaches

Pos.	No.	Name	Age – Date of birth	Height	Club	Ctr.
	4	Stephen Kollie	19 – 14 August 1988		Invincible Eleven	(Liberia)
G	5	Samson Nyonno	32 – 6 April 1975		NPA Pythons	(Liberia)
	6	Stuart Koffa	21 – 24 February 1986		NPA Pythons	(Liberia)
	7	Sam Gbollie	24 – 25 December 1982			(Liberia)
	8	Jonathan Krah	35 – 18 April 1972		NPA Pythons	(Liberia)
	9	Vernon Gbotoe	19 – 1 April 1988		Dream Team (Liberia)	(Liberia)
	10	Patrick Tugbe	21 – 15 October 1985		Invincible Eleven	(Liberia)
	11	Harold Mulbah	25 – 13 January 1982			(Liberia)
G	12	Phillip Flomo	19 – 19 December 1987	5 ft 10 in (1.78 m)	NPA Pythons	(Liberia)
	13	Raymond Kromah	17 – 29 June 1990			(Liberia)
	14	Desmond Wesseh	25 – 4 September 1981
	15	Ryan Yakpah	23 – 4 February 1984			(Liberia)

Head coach

- (Liberia) Adam Sackor

Assistant coach(es)

(Liberia) Theodore Suah

Legend

- Club – describes last
  club before the tournament
- Age – describes age
  on 15 August 2007

At the AfroBasket 2007 in Angola, Raphael M. Quaye played most minutes and recorded most assists and steals for Liberia.

=== Depth chart ===
Pos.	Starting 5	Bench	Bench 3
C
PF
SF
SG	Samson Nyonno
PG	Harold Mulbah		J Wellington Barchue Jr

== Notable players ==
Other current notable players from Liberia:

Liberia men's national basketball team roster
Players	Coaches
Pos. / No. / Name / Age – Date of birth / Height / Club; G / / Prince Williams / 27 – 22 August 1992 / 1.93 m (6 ft 4 in) / Rethymno Cretan Kings B.C. / (Greece)	Legend: Club – describes current club; Age – describes age on 13 January 2020

== Competitive record ==
=== Summer Olympics ===
yet to qualify

=== World championships ===
yet to qualify

=== FIBA Africa Championship ===
Year	Position	Tournament	Host
1983	9	FIBA Africa Championship 1983	Alexandria, Egypt
2007	16	FIBA Africa Championship 2007	Angola

=== African Games ===
- 1965-2003 : Did not qualify
- 2007 : 11th
- 2011-2015 : Did not qualify

== Past rosters ==
1983 FIBA Africa Championship: finished 9th among 10 teams

2007 FIBA Africa Championship: finished 16th among 16 teams

John Bing, Jethro Bing, Varney Tulay, Marcus Wolo, Fitzgerald Cole, Alphonso Kuiah, Raphael Quaye, Francis Fayiah, Alvin Tapeh, Mark Smith, Joseph Lackey, Richelieu Allison, Cephus Solo, Meshach McBorrough, Samuel Assembe (Coach: Allan Jallah)

== See also ==
- Liberia women's national basketball team
- Liberia national under-19 basketball team
