= Sani Ahmed =

Nigerian professional basketball coach

Kano Pillars
- Position: Head coach

Personal information
- Born: Nigeria

Career information
- Playing career: 2006–present

Career history
- 2006–present: Kano Pillars

Sani Ahmed is a Nigerian professional basketball coach who has led the Kano Pillars since 2006.

In 2006, 2010 and 2013, he was head coach of Nigeria's national basketball team.
