= Pavilhão do Maxaquene =

Indoor sporting arena in Maputo, Mozambique

- Interactive map of Pavilhão do Maxaquene
- Full name: Pavilhao Millenium Bim Maxaquene
- Location: Maputo, Mozambique
- Coordinates: 25.9746°S 32.5771°E
- Capacity: 5,000

Construction
- Opened: 2011

Tenant
- C.D. Maxaquene

Pavilhão do Maxaquene is an indoor sporting arena located in Maputo, Mozambique. The capacity of the arena is 5,000 spectators. It hosts indoor sporting events such as basketball and hosts the home matches of C.D. Maxaquene. It also hosted the 2011 All-Africa Games volleyball matches.

The arena is the official hub for the Mozambique men's national basketball team and also hosts some Mozambique women's national basketball team games. It can be used for other team sports and individual sports, as well as for social events and political events.
