= Nigeria women's national basketball team =

Nigeria
- FIBA ranking: 8 (18 March 2026)
- Joined FIBA: 1964
- FIBA zone: FIBA Africa
- National federation: Nigeria Basketball Federation
- Coach: Rena Wakama
- Nickname: D'Tigress

Olympic Games
- Appearances: 3

World Cup
- Appearances: 3
- Medals: Quarter-finals (2018)

AfroBasket
- Appearances: 15
- Medals: (2003, 2005, 2017, 2019, 2021, 2023, 2025) (1997, 2015)

All Africa Games
- Appearances: 8
- Medals: (gold) Gold: (2003); (silver) Silver: (2007, 2015); (bronze) Bronze: (1978, 1999, 2011)
Home	Away

The Nigeria women's national basketball team, also known as the D'Tigress, represents Nigeria in international women's basketball competition, and are regulated by the Nigeria Basketball Federation, the governing body for basketball in Nigeria. Nigeria has one of the most successful women's national teams on the African continent, being the current African champions. They have won the Women's Afrobasket Championship a record five times in a row and seven times in total. They won in 2017 at Bamako, Mali, 2019 at Dakar, Senegal, 2021 at Yaounde, Cameroon, 2023 at Kigali, Rwanda, and 2025 at Abidjan, Ivory Coast. They are the only African team to reach the quarter finals of both the Fiba Women's World Cup and the Olympics.

== History ==
=== 2004 Summer Olympics ===
The Nigerians competed at the 2004 Summer Olympics in basketball, one of ten events their national teams qualified for. The Nigerian women's basketball team was one of the twelve teams competing in the event. They earned their berth through a zone qualifying tournament and played in Group A along with Australia, Brazil, Greece, Japan, and Russia. The team went 0–5 in the preliminary round. In the 11/12th place game, they defeated the Korea for a final finish of 11th out of 12 teams. With this win, they became the first women's African basketball team to win a game at the Olympics.

Mfon Udoka was the team's leading scorer and the tournament's second highest scorer. Team athletes Itoro Umoh-Coleman and Joanne Aluka both played high school basketball at Hephzibah High School prior to playing together for Nigeria.

=== 2006 FIBA World Championship for Women ===
Nigeria qualified for the 2006 FIBA World Championship by winning the 2005 FIBA Africa Championship for Women. They were placed into Group C with China, Russia, and the United States. Nigeria did not qualify for a pass into the second round and were defeated in the 15/16th place game by fellow African representatives Senegal by a score of 66–64. Their tournament record was 0–5.

Nigeria also participated in the 2006 Commonwealth Games held in Melbourne, Australia.

=== Team in 2007 ===
The team attended the FIBA Africa Championship for Women 2007; the qualifying event for African teams attempting to make the 2008 Summer Olympics. Nigeria made it to the quarterfinals of the 2007 FIBA African Championship before losing to Mozambique 69–61. They won fifth place by defeating Cameroon 63–50. The team did not qualify for the Beijing Olympic Games.

The Nigerian squad went undefeated in group play during the 2007 All-Africa Games. They went on to the semi-finals and lost to Mozambique 57–46.

=== 2009 Nations Cup ===
Nigeria has qualified for the 2009 Africa Cup of Nations (basketball) to be held in Libya.

=== 2024 Summer Olympics ===
At the 2024 Summer Olympics in Paris, the Nigerian women’s basketball team defeated Australia 75-62 in their first game. This was the team’s first Olympic game victory in 20 years. The team lost its second game in the tournament 75-54 against the host nation, France. In their third game against Canada, they won 79-70 to advance to the quarterfinals for the first time ever. With this victory, the team became the first African basketball team, male or female, to qualify for the quarterfinals of the basketball competition at the Olympics.

== Competitive record ==
=== FIBA World Cup ===
FIBA World Cup record
Year	Round	Position	Pld	W	L	PF	PA	PD
(Chile) 1953	N/A (Team did not exist)							
(Brazil) 1957	N/A (Team did not exist)							
(Soviet Union) 1959	N/A (Team did not exist)							
(Peru) 1964	did not enter							
(Czechoslovakia) 1967	did not enter							
(Brazil) 1971	did not enter							
(Colombia) 1975	did not qualify							
(South Korea) 1979	did not enter							
(Brazil) 1983	did not enter							
(Soviet Union) 1986	did not enter							
(Malaysia) 1990	did not enter							
(Australia) 1994	did not enter							
(Germany) 1998	did not qualify							
(China) 2002	did not enter							
(Brazil) 2006	Group stage	16th	5	0	5	296	381	−85
(Czech Republic) 2010	did not qualify							
(Turkey) 2014	did not qualify							
(Spain) 2018	Quarter-finals	8th	7	3	4	448	508	−60
(Australia) 2022	Withdrawn							
(Germany) 2026	Group stage	16th	3	0	3	204	281	−77
(Japan) 2030	To be determined							
Total	3/21	0 titles	15	3	12	948	1170	−222

=== Summer Olympics ===
Olympic Games record
Year	Reached	Position	GP	W	L	GS	GA	GD
(Canada) 1976	did not enter							
(Soviet Union) 1980	did not enter							
(United States) 1984	did not enter							
(South Korea) 1988	did not enter							
(Spain) 1992	did not enter							
(United States) 1996	did not qualify							
(Australia) 2000	did not qualify							
(Greece) 2004	Group stage	11th	6	1	5	403	486	−83
(China) 2008	did not qualify							
(United Kingdom) 2012	did not qualify							
(Brazil) 2016	did not qualify							
(Japan) 2020	Group stage	11th	3	0	3	217	270	−53
(France) 2024	Quarterfinals	8th	4	2	2	282	295	−13
Total	3/13	0 titles	13	3	10	902	1051	−149

=== AfroBasket Women ===
AfroBasket record
Year	Round	Position	GP	W	L	GS	GA	GD
(Guinea) 1966	did not enter							
(United Arab Republic) 1968	did not enter							
(Tunisia) 1970	did not enter							
(Tunisia) 1974	Group stage	5th	5	3	2	278	245	+33
(Senegal) 1977	did not enter							
(Somalia) 1979	did not enter							
(Senegal) 1981	Group stage	7th	4	1	3	215	280	−65
(Senegal) 1983	did not enter							
(Senegal) 1984	did not enter							
(Mozambique) 1986	did not enter							
(Tunisia) 1990	did not enter							
(Senegal) 1993	did not enter							
(South Africa) 1994	did not enter							
(Kenya) 1997	Semi-finals	3rd	6	4	2	398	310	+88
(Senegal) 2000	did not enter							
(Mozambique) 2003	Champions	1st	6	5	1	386	328	+58
(Nigeria) 2005	Champions	1st	5	2	3	454	293	+161
(Senegal) 2007	Quarter-finals	5th	8	6	2	516	448	+68
(Madagascar) 2009	Quarter-finals	5th	8	4	4	441	440	+1
(Mali) 2011	Semi-finals	4th	8	4	4	511	502	+9
(Mozambique) 2013	Quarter-finals	6th	8	3	5	411	429	−18
(Cameroon) 2015	Semi-final	3rd	8	6	2	608	477	+131
(Mali) 2017	Champions	1st	8	8	0	645	413	+232
(Senegal) 2019	Champions	1st	5	5	0	399	243	+156
(Cameroon) 2021	Champions	1st	5	5	0	367	292	+75
(Rwanda) 2023	Champions	1st	5	5	0	374	274	+100
(Ivory Coast) 2025	Champions	1st	5	5	0	418	279	+139
Total	15/29	7 titles	94	66	28	6421	5253	+1002

== Team honours and achievements ==
Intercontinental

- FIBA Women's Basketball World Cup
  - Quarterfinals: 2018

Continental

- AfroBasket Women
  - Gold Medal: 2003, 2005, 2017 2019 2021 2023 2025
  - Bronze Medal: 1997, 2015
- All Africa Games
  - Gold Medal: (gold) 2003
  - Silver Medal: (silver) 2007, (silver) 2015
  - Bronze Medal: (bronze) 1995, (bronze) 1978, (bronze) 1999, (bronze) 2011

== Team ==
=== Current roster ===
Roster for the 2026 FIBA Women's Basketball World Cup.

Nigeria women's national basketball team – 2026 FIBA World Cup roster
Players
Coaches

Pos.	No.	Name	Age – Date of birth	Height	Club	Ctr.
F	0	Amy Okonkwo (C)	30 – 26 August 1996	1.88 m (6 ft 2 in)	Portland Fire	(United States)
SG	1	Grace Efosa-Aguebor	24 – 27 May 2002	1.77 m (5 ft 10 in)	Saint-Amand Hainaut	(France)
C	3	Pallas Kunaiyi-Akpannah	29 – 12 July 1997	1.88 m (6 ft 2 in)	Emlak Konut SK	(Turkey)
G	4	Elizabeth Balogun	25 – 9 September 2000	1.85 m (6 ft 1 in)	Valencia Basket	(Spain)
F	5	Jordan Obi	23 – 18 September 2002	1.85 m (6 ft 1 in)	Kirklareli Basketbol SK	(Turkey)
PG	10	Promise Amukamara	33 – 22 June 1993	1.75 m (5 ft 9 in)	REG BBC	(Rwanda)
PF	15	Maryam Dauda	23 – 20 September 2002	1.93 m (6 ft 4 in)	Morlaix Saint Martin	(France)
F	20	Murjanatu Musa	26 – 5 May 2000	1.87 m (6 ft 2 in)	Basket Landes	(France)
PG	23	Ezinne Kalu	34 – 26 June 1992	1.73 m (5 ft 8 in)	Beijing Great Wall	(China)
C	25	Victoria Macaulay	36 – 7 August 1990	1.93 m (6 ft 4 in)	Athinaikos Qualco	(Greece)
C	32	Rita Igbokwe	25 – 28 January 2001	1.93 m (6 ft 4 in)	Baloncesto Leganés	(Spain)
F	33	Nicole Enabosi	29 – 26 March 1997	1.83 m (6 ft 0 in)	DVTK Huntherm	(Hungary)

Head coach

- (Nigeria) Rena Wakama

Assistant coach(es)

- (France) Wani Muganguzi

Legend

- (C) Team captain
- Club – describes last
  club before the tournament
- Age – describes age
  on 4 September 2026

=== Former players and coaches ===
This is a list of former players and coaches, as well as current players who have played on past squads, with their years on the team indicated by the Nigerian flag beneath a given year.

Name	Number	Position	Nationality	2004*	2005	2006	2007	2008	2009
Olawunmi Adebayo	9					Nigeria			
Tayeloly Adeniyi	10					Nigeria			
Mobolaji Akiode	6	Guard	Nigeria	Nigeria		Nigeria			
Joanne Aluka	5	Forward	United States	Nigeria					
Mactabene Amachree	13	Guard	Nigeria	Nigeria				As a player from 1994 to 2009 as an Executive 2017 to 2021	
Parricia Chukwuma	12					Nigeria			
Kevin Cook		Coach				Nigeria	Nigeria		
Adenike Dawodu	11					Nigeria			
Nguveren Iyorhe	10	Guard		Nigeria					
Ezinne James	15					Nigeria			
Aisha Mohammed	9	Guard		Nigeria		Nigeria			
Juliana Ojoshogu Negedu	7	Guard		Nigeria					
Scott Nnaji		Coach				Nigeria			
Chineze Nwagbo	8					Nigeria			
Linda Ogugua	15	Center	Nigeria	Nigeria					
Morolake Ogunoye	5					Nigeria			
Ugo Oha	8	Center	United States	Nigeria					
Ugochuckwu Oha	15					Nigeria	Nigeria		
Funmilayo Ojelabi-Ogunleye	10					Nigeria	Nigeria		
Mercy Okorie	7					Nigeria	Nigeria		
Adeola Olanrewaju	14					Nigeria			
Taiwo Rafiu	14	Center		Nigeria					
Rashidat Sadiq	12	Forward		Nigeria		Nigeria			
Sam Vincent (basketball)		Coach		Nigeria					
Itoro Umoh-Coleman	4	Guard	United States	Nigeria		Nigeria			
Tamunomiete Whyte	5					Nigeria			

*Olympic games attended by the squad indicated in this year.

== See also ==
- Nigeria women's national under-19 basketball team
- Nigeria women's national under-17 basketball team
