= Solomon Tat =

Nigerian basketball player

Medal record

Men's basketball

Representing Nigeria

African Championships
Bronze medal – third place	2011 Madagascar	Nigeria

Solomon Tat (born July 29, 1986) is a Nigerian basketball player. He competed for Nigeria at the 2011 FIBA Africa Championship, where the team finished in third place. He is a native of Jos Plateau, Nigeria and played college basketball with the Virginia Cavaliers men's basketball team. He was a tri-captain of the 2009-10 Cavaliers team as a senior.
