= Cameroon women's national basketball team =

Cameroon
- FIBA ranking: 35 ▲7 (8 August 2025)
- Joined FIBA: 1965
- FIBA zone: FIBA Africa
- National federation: Fédération Camerounaise de Basketball
- Coach: Ahmed Mbombo

AfroBasket
- Appearances: 15
- Medals: (silver) (2015); (bronze) (1983, 1984, 2021)
Home	Away

The Cameroon women's national basketball team is the nationally controlled basketball team representing Cameroon at world basketball competitions for women.

== African Championship record ==
- 1983 – 3rd
- 1984 – 3rd
- 1986 – 4th
- 1997 – 7th
- 2003 – 8th
- 2007 – 6th
- 2009 – 7th
- 2011 – 6th
- 2013 – 4th
- 2015 – 2nd
- 2017 – 8th
- 2019 – 10th
- 2021 – 3rd
- 2023 – 6th
- 2025 – 5th

== Current roster ==
Roster for the 2025 Women's Afrobasket.

Cameroon women's national basketball team roster
Players
Coaches

Pos.	No.	Name	Age – Date of birth	Height	Club	Ctr.
G	0	Joëlly Belleka	29 – 27 August 1995	1.71 m (5 ft 7 in)	USO Mondeville	(France)
G	3	Jessica Thomas	30 – 27 October 1994	1.68 m (5 ft 6 in)	Emlak Konut SK	(Turkey)
SG	6	Kelya Kipo	19 – 16 May 2006	1.83 m (6 ft 0 in)	FAP Basketball	(Cameroon)
G	10	Sema Ekah	22 – 18 June 2003	1.76 m (5 ft 9 in)	Overdose Up Station	(Cameroon)
PF	12	Dulcy Fankam Mendjiadeu	26 – 26 July 1999	1.94 m (6 ft 4 in)	ŽKK Crvena zvezda	(Serbia)
F	13	Marguerite Effa	28 – 18 January 1997	1.91 m (6 ft 3 in)	USLG Cherbourg	(France)
F	14	Marina Ewodo	27 – 24 June 1998	1.85 m (6 ft 1 in)	Tarbes Gespe Bigorre	(France)
F	22	Maëva Mfonow	20 – 22 April 2005	1.85 m (6 ft 1 in)	Toulouse Métropole Basket	(France)
F	23	Carina Silatsa	27 – 28 April 1998	1.86 m (6 ft 1 in)	Roche Vendée	(France)
C	24	Damaris Emédié	18 – 19 January 2007	1.92 m (6 ft 4 in)	University of Douala	(Cameroon)
SG	34	Cynthia Williams	22 – 13 April 2003	1.72 m (5 ft 8 in)	University of Douala	(Cameroon)
PG	66	Josiane Tientcheu	27 – 6 June 1998	1.67 m (5 ft 6 in)	Kepler BBC	(Rwanda)

Head coach

- (Cameroon) Ahmed Mbombo

Assistant coach(es)

- (Italy) Stefano Bizzozi
- (Cameroon) Alfred Njie Akum

Legend

- Club – describes last
  club before the tournament
- Age – describes age
  on 26 July 2025
