= Zimbabwe women's national basketball team =

Zimbabwe
- FIBA ranking: 113 ▼4 (8 August 2025)
- Joined FIBA: 1963
- FIBA zone: FIBA Africa
- National federation: Basketball Union of Zimbabwe
- Coach: Wilfried Gbongo

AfroBasket
- Appearances: 2

The Zimbabwe women's national basketball team represents the Zimbabwe in international competitions. It is administered by the Basketball Union of Zimbabwe.

== AfroBasket record ==
- 1994 – 7th place
- 2011 – 12th place
