= Jayson Obazuaye =

Basketball player

Al Karkh
- Position: Shooting guard
- League: Iraqi Basketball Premier League

Personal information
- Born: July 27, 1984 (age 42) Santa Clara, California, U.S.
- Listed height: 6 ft 4 in (1.93 m)
- Listed weight: 216 lb (98 kg)

Career information
- High school: Andrew Hill (San Jose, California)
- College: Colorado (2002–2006)
- NBA draft: 2006: undrafted
- Playing career: 2006–present

Career history
- 2006–2007: Gipsar Stal Ostrów
- 2007–2008: Chester Jets
- 2008–2009: Milton Keynes Lions
- 2009–2010: Al-Ahli Benghazi
- 2010–2011: Al-Wakrah
- 2011–2012: Smouha
- 2012–2013: Al-Wakrah
- 2013–2014: Al-Jazeera
- 2014–present: Al Karkh

Career highlights
- British Basketball League second-team All-Star (2008)
Medals
Men's basketball
Representing Nigeria
African Championships
Bronze medal – third place	2011 Madagascar	Team

Jayson Omokaro Obazuaye (born July 27, 1984) is an American-Nigerian professional basketball guard. He is 190 centimetres (6 ft 3 in) tall.

== Early life ==
Born in Santa Clara, California, Obazuaye graduated from Andrew Hill High School in nearby San Jose, California in 2002. Obazuaye committed to the University of Colorado Boulder, having been recruited by local colleges Santa Clara and California, as well as Iowa State and Oklahoma.

College recruiting
Name	Hometown	School	Height	Weight	Commit date
Jayson Obazuaye; SG	San Jose, CA	Andrew Hill HS	6 ft 3 in (1.91 m)	195 lb (88 kg)	Oct 8, 2001
Jayson Obazuaye; SG	Recruit ratings: No ratings found				
Overall recruit ranking: Scout: 67 (SG); 12 (CA)
Note: In many cases, Scout, Rivals, 247Sports, On3, and ESPN may conflict in their listings of height and weight.; In these cases, the average was taken. ESPN grades are on a 100-point scale.; Sources: "2002 Colorado Basketball Commitment List". Rivals.; "2002 Colorado College Basketball Team Recruiting Prospects". Scout.; "Scout.com Team Recruiting Rankings". Scout.; "2002 Team Ranking". Rivals.

== College career ==
Obazuaye majored in ethnic studies and played four years for the Colorado Buffaloes men's basketball team from 2002 to 2006

== Professional career ==
Obazuaye began his professional career in the 2006–07 season with Gipsar Stal Ostrów of the Polish Basketball League. He averaged 3.1 points and 1.1 rebounds in 10 games.

In the 2007–08 season, Obazuaye played for the Chester Jets of the British Basketball League. Obazuaye was the BBL's January 2008 Player of the Month and a 2nd-Team All-Star for the season.

In the 2008–09 season, Obazuaye played for the BBL's Milton Keynes Lions. He averaged 18.8 points and 4.0 rebounds in BBL Trophy games and 14.4 points and 4.0 rebounds in the playoff and championship rounds.

After two seasons with the BBL, Obazuaye played for Al-Ahli Benghazi of the Libyan Basketball League for the 2009–10 season. He averaged 20 points, 6 rebounds, and 4 assists. In the 2010–11 season, Obazuaye played for another Middle East team, Al-Wakrah of the Qatari Basketball League. In 2011–12, Obazuaye played for Smouha of Egyptian Basketball Super League.

Obazuaye returned to Al-Wakrah in the 2012–13 season for 8 games, averaging 14.6 points, 3.3 rebounds, and 5.5 assists. In 2013–14, Obazuaye played for Al-Jazeera of Libyan Basketball League. In 2014–15, he played for Al-Karkh of Iraqi Basketball Premier League.

== International career ==
He represented Nigeria at the 2007 African Championship and 2009 African Championship averaging 8.2 points, 3.8 rebounds and 2.8 assists per game
