= AfroBasket 2011 squads =

2011 FIBA Africa Championship squads

This article displays the rosters for the participating teams at the 2011 FIBA Africa Championship.

== Group A ==
=== Madagascar ===
Head coach:

#	Pos	Name	Club	Date of Birth	Height
4	PG	René Rakotondrasolo	(France) CEP Lorient	October 15, 1979 (age 45)	1.80 m (5 ft 11 in)
5	PG	Rovanantenaina Andrianjafy	(Madagascar) A.S.C.U.T.	March 4, 1989 (age 36)	1.83 m (6 ft 0 in)
6	C	Charles Ramsdell	(Spain) Ávila	January 13, 1985 (age 40)	2.08 m (6 ft 10 in)
7	SF	Romule Razafimahasahy	(Madagascar) A.S.C.U.T.	April 22, 1988 (age 36)	1.88 m (6 ft 2 in)
8	G	Andry Rakotoarisoa	(Madagascar) Anamalanga	August 2, 1981 (age 43)	1.78 m (5 ft 10 in)
9	F	Rijaniaina Andrianiombonana	(Madagascar) Fanatic Basket	July 22, 1985 (age 39)	1.80 m (5 ft 11 in)
10	G	Yerison Rabekoto	(France) Jeunesse Canon	April 16, 1984 (age 40)	1.78 m (5 ft 10 in)
11	PF	Toto Velondriskiy	(Madagascar) A.S.C.U.M.	March 18, 1978 (age 47)	1.97 m (6 ft 5 1/2 in)
12	C	Robert Kilobo		August 12, 1983 (age 41)	2.00 m (6 ft 6 1/2 in)
13	F	Guillaume Randrianandrasana	(Madagascar) A.S.C.U.T.	May 6, 1985 (age 39)	1.86 m (6 ft 1 in)
14	C	Jaofeno Djianfary	(Madagascar) A.S.C.U.T.	August 11, 1984 (age 40)	1.92 m (6 ft 3 1/2 in)
15	C	Ahmed Zayad	(Madagascar) A.S.C.U.M.	January 25, 1990 (age 35)	1.95 m (6 ft 5 in)

=== Mali ===
Head coach:

#	Pos	Name	Club	Date of Birth	Height
4	G	Modibo Niakate	(France) US Orchies	March 26, 1981 (age 43)	1.85 m (6 ft 1 in)
5	F	Mamadou Sy	(France) Lille MB	July 28, 1985 (age 39)	1.99 m (6 ft 6 1/2 in)
6	G	Naré Keita	(France) Boulzac	May 13, 1990 (age 34)	1.85 m (6 ft 1 in)
7	PG	Salif Niangado	(Mali) AS Réal	September 13, 1981 (age 43)	1.82 m (5 ft 11 1/2 in)
8	G	Waly Coulibaly	(United States) University of Hawaii	February 10, 1988 (age 37)	1.90 m (6 ft 3 in)
9	SF	Amadou Kaba	(Morocco) Stage Tanger	November 10, 1990 (age 34)	1.90 m (6 ft 3 in)
10	F	Ba Sekou Diallo	(Mali) AS Réal	August 29, 1986 (age 38)	1.92 m (6 ft 3 1/2 in)
11	C	Soumaila Samake	(Iran) Caspian Qazvin	March 18, 1978 (age 47)	2.15 m (7 ft 1/2 in)
12	F	Cheick Soumaoro	(France) SPO Rouen	June 21, 1990 (age 34)	2.07 m (6 ft 9 1/2 in)
13	PF	Mahamadou Doucoure	(France) Metz BC	December 7, 1985 (age 39)	2.06 m (6 ft 9 in)
14	C	Mohamed Tangara	(Spain) Araberri BC	August 11, 1984 (age 40)	2.09 m (6 ft 10 1/2 in)
15	C	Mamadou Diarra	(United States) University of Hawaii	August 29, 1986 (age 38)	2.13 m (7 ft 0 in)

=== Mozambique ===
Head coach: (Spain) Iñaki Garcia

#	Pos	Name	Club	Date of Birth	Height
4	SG	Fernando Mandlate	(Mozambique) Maxaquene Maputo	August 11, 1985 (age 39)	1.90 m (6 ft 3 in)
5	PG	Samora Mucavel	(Mozambique) Maxaquene Maputo	September 9, 1986 (age 38)	1.85 m (6 ft 1 in)
6	PG	David Canviete	(Mozambique) Deportivo Travederos	August 9, 1989 (age 35)	1.90 m (6 ft 3 in)
7	PG	Sivio Letela	(Mozambique) Maxaquene Maputo	December 6, 1982 (age 42)	1.90 m (6 ft 3 in)
8	SG	Augusto Matos	(Mozambique) Deportivo Travederos	November 29, 1990 (age 34)	1.85 m (6 ft 1 in)
9	PG	Amarildo Matos	(Mozambique) Deportivo Travederos	March 12, 1985 (age 40)	1.90 m (6 ft 3 in)
10	C	Custodio Muchate	(Mozambique) Ferroviario Beira	May 6, 1982 (age 42)	1.98 m (6 ft 6 in)
11	PF	Stélio Nuaila	(Mozambique) Maxaquene Maputo	April 24, 1985 (age 39)	1.95 m (6 ft 5 in)
12	C	Octávio Magoliço	(Mozambique) Ferroviario Beira	October 4, 1984 (age 40)	2.00 m (6 ft 6 1/2 in)
13	PG	Pio Matos	(Mozambique) Deportivo Travederos	November 29, 1990 (age 34)	1.85 m (6 ft 1 in)
14	C	Armando Baptista	(Mozambique) Ferroviario Beira	June 2, 1985 (age 39)	2.00 m (6 ft 6 1/2 in)
15	C	Sergio Macuacua	(Mozambique) Ferroviario Beira	October 2, 1980 (age 44)	1.98 m (6 ft 6 in)

=== Nigeria ===
Head coach: John Lucas

#	Pos	Name	Club	Date of Birth	Height
4	G	Solomon Tat
5	G/F	Ime Udoka		August 9, 1977 (age 47)	1.96 m (6 ft 5 in)
6	G	Jayson Obazuaye		July 27, 1984 (age 40)	1.88 m (6 ft 2 in)
7	SG	Abubakar Usman	(Nigeria) Kano Pillars	May 2, 1979 (age 45)	1.92 m (6 ft 3 1/2 in)
8	G	Michael Umeh		September 18, 1984 (age 40)	1.88 m (6 ft 2 in)
9	G	Chinedu Onyeuku
10	F/C	Ike Ofoegbu
11	SF	Stanley Gumut	(Libya) Al Morog	February 21, 1986 (age 39)	1.98 m (6 ft 6 in)
12	F	Ejike Ugboaja		May 28, 1985 (age 39)	2.06 m (6 ft 9 in)
13	F	Derrick Obasohan	(Portugal) Belenenses	April 18, 1981 (age 43)	1.98 m (6 ft 6 in)
14	F/C	Ezenwa Ukeagu
15	C	Olumide Oyedeji		May 11, 1981 (age 43)	2.06 m (6 ft 9 in)

== Group B ==
=== Angola ===
Head coach: (France) Michel Gomez

#	Pos	Name	Club	Date of Birth	Height
4	C	Valdelício Joaquim	(United States) Eastern Utah	April 15, 1990 (age 34)	2.09 m (6 ft 10 1/2 in)
5	PG	Armando Costa	(Angola) Primeiro Agosto	June 3, 1983 (age 41)	1.87 m (6 ft 1 1/2 in)
6	SF	Carlos Morais	(Angola) Clube do Libolo	October 16, 1985 (age 39)	1.93 m (6 ft 4 in)
7	PG	Domingos Bonifacio	(Angola) Clube do Libolo	October 28, 1984 (age 40)	1.89 m (6 ft 2 1/2 in)
8	SF	Simao Santos	(Angola) Atlético Sport Aviação	July 21, 1982 (age 42)	1.98 m (6 ft 6 in)
9	PF	Leonel Paulo	(Angola) Clube do Libolo	April 30, 1986 (age 38)	1.98 m (6 ft 6 in)
10	SF	Joaquim Gomes	(Angola) Primeiro Agosto	December 23, 1980 (age 44)	2.02 m (6 ft 7 1/2 in)
11	F	Miguel Kiala	(Angola) Atlético Luanda	November 10, 1990 (age 34)	1.98 m (6 ft 6 in)
12	C	Felizardo Ambrosio	(Angola) Primeiro Agosto	December 25, 1987 (age 37)	2.02 m (6 ft 7 1/2 in)
13	F	Jorge Tati	(Angola) Interclube	June 17, 1983 (age 41)	1.95 m (6 ft 5 in)
14	G	Milton Barros	(Angola) Atlético Luanda	June 21, 1984 (age 40)	1.83 m (6 ft 0 in)
15	C	Eduardo Mingas	(Angola) Atlético Luanda	January 29, 1979 (age 46)	1.98 m (6 ft 6 in)

=== Chad ===
Head coach: Patrick Maucouvert

#	Pos	Name	Club	Date of Birth	Height
4	PG	Asnal Noubaramadji	(Chad) AS Archibeau	April 3, 1985 (age 39)	1.83 m (6 ft 0 in)
5	PG	Dillah Mbairessem	(Chad) AS Africana	November 1, 1980 (age 44)	1.93 m (6 ft 4 in)
6	SF	Koïbé Mickael	(Chad) AS Archibeau	December 18, 1992 (age 32)	1.98 m (6 ft 6 in)
7	F	Abderamane Mbaindiguim	(Chad) CSM Constantine	March 1, 1982 (age 43)	1.95 m (6 ft 5 in)
8	F	Djimtoïde Mgarasde	(Chad) AS Archibeau	September 5, 1987 (age 37)	1.99 m (6 ft 6 1/2 in)
9	PF	Mario Ngadi	(Chad) AS Africana	June 5, 1986 (age 38)	2.00 m (6 ft 6 1/2 in)
10	F	Richard Moguena	(Chad) AS Africana	September 1, 1986 (age 38)	2.00 m (6 ft 6 1/2 in)
11	F	Ronald Nato Kolmia	(Chad) AS Constructor	November 20, 1992 (age 32)	1.99 m (6 ft 6 1/2 in)
12	SF	Garba Makka	(United States) Virginia Union University	December 24, 1988 (age 36)	2.01 m (6 ft 7 in)
13	C	Sale Ousmane	(Ivory Coast) Abidjan BC	October 19, 1980 (age 44)	1.05 m (3 ft 5 1/2 in)
14	C	Bienvenu Djimassal	(Chad) AS Africana	September 10, 1993 (age 31)	2.00 m (6 ft 6 1/2 in)
15	F	Théodore Mbaïarsi	(Ivory Coast) Abidjan BC	November 5, 1976 (age 48)	1.93 m (6 ft 4 in)

=== Morocco ===
Head coach:

#	Pos	Name	Club	Date of Birth	Height
4	PF	Abderrahim Najah	(Morocco) Association Salé	November 20, 1984 (age 40)	2.00 m (6 ft 6 1/2 in)
5	F	Yassine Bassine		April 26, 1984 (age 40)	1.97 m (6 ft 5 1/2 in)
6	C	Soufiane Kourdou	(Morocco) Association Salé	May 21, 1985 (age 39)	2.06 m (6 ft 9 in)
7	SG	Zakaria El Mesbahi	(Morocco) Association Salé	March 29, 1979 (age 45)	1.93 m (6 ft 4 in)
8	PG	Mustapha Khalfi	(Morocco) IR Tanger	January 1, 1980 (age 45)	1.81 m (5 ft 11 1/2 in)
9	PG	Sophian Rafai	(Morocco) Raja Casablanca	December 16, 1986 (age 38)	1.87 m (6 ft 1 1/2 in)
10	PF	Oumar Laânani	(Morocco) IR Tanger	March 26, 1987 (age 37)	2.00 m (6 ft 6 1/2 in)
11	F	Abdelhakim Zouita	(Morocco) Association Salé	August 12, 1986 (age 38)	2.00 m (6 ft 6 1/2 in)
12	SG	Reda Harras	(Morocco) Raja Casablanca	November 24, 1993 (age 31)	1.98 m (6 ft 6 in)
13	G	Hicham Amrallah		July 16, 1978 (age 46)	1.84 m (6 ft 1/2 in)
14	SF	Kamal Hachad		July 22, 1983 (age 41)	1.96 m (6 ft 5 in)
15	C	Reda Rhalimi	(Morocco) Association Salé	February 2, 1982 (age 43)	2.05 m (6 ft 8 1/2 in)

=== Senegal ===
Head coach: Moustapha Gaye

#	Pos	Name	Club	Date of Birth	Height
4	SG	El Hadji Ndiaye	(Senegal) Dakar University	November 18, 1986 (age 38)	1.96 m (6 ft 5 in)
5	PG	Xane Dalmeida	(France) CSP Limoges	January 21, 1983 (age 42)	1.83 m (6 ft 0 in)
6	PG	Thierno Niang	(United States) Triton College	March 8, 1990 (age 35)	1.84 m (6 ft 1/2 in)
7	PG	Mamadou Ndoye	(Senegal) UGB	October 6, 1979 (age 45)	1.90 m (6 ft 3 in)
8	SF	Mohamed Diop	(Senegal) UGB	May 14, 1981 (age 43)	1.98 m (6 ft 6 in)
9	F	Maleye Ndoye	(France) Orléans Basket	August 19, 1980 (age 44)	2.03 m (6 ft 8 in)
10	PF	Thiendou Diasse	(France) Stade Montois Basket	May 18, 1986 (age 38)	2.02 m (6 ft 7 1/2 in)
11	F	Mouhammad Faye	(France) Toulon Basket	September 14, 1985 (age 39)	2.08 m (6 ft 10 in)
12	C	Boubacar Coly	(Japan) Phoenix BC	July 11, 1983 (age 41)	2.06 m (6 ft 9 in)
13	C	Babacar Toure	(Switzerland) Geneve Basket	November 14, 1985 (age 39)	2.05 m (6 ft 8 1/2 in)
14	C	Malick Badiane	(France) Boulzac Basket	January 1, 1984 (age 41)	2.11 m (6 ft 11 in)
15	C	Papa Ndiaga Diasse	(Croatia) KK Zagreb	February 7, 1987 (age 38)	2.12 m (6 ft 11 1/2 in)

== Group C ==
=== Cameroon ===
Head coach: Lazare Adingono

#	Pos	Name	Club	Date of Birth	Height
4	PF	Georges Manyaka	(Qatar) Al-Ahli	March 1, 1987 (age 38)	2.04 m (6 ft 8 1/2 in)
5	PG	Cyrille Makanda	(Cyprus) AEK Larnaca	May 5, 1980 (age 44)	1.95 m (6 ft 5 in)
6	G	Parfait Bitee		July 23, 1985 (age 39)	1.92 m (6 ft 3 1/2 in)
7	G	Franck Ndongo		December 7, 1988 (age 36)	2.00 m (6 ft 6 1/2 in)
8	SF	Christian Bayang	(Cameroon) Condor BC	May 7, 1987 (age 37)	1.96 m (6 ft 5 in)
9	SF	Brice Nengsu		January 25, 1983 (age 42)	1.95 m (6 ft 5 in)
11	SF	Christopher Rodgers		January 10, 1984 (age 41)	1.97 m (6 ft 5 1/2 in)
12	C	Alfred Aboya		January 2, 1985 (age 40)	2.03 m (6 ft 8 in)
13	PF	Alexis Wangemene	(United States) University of Texas	March 1, 1989 (age 36)	2.03 m (6 ft 8 in)
14	C	Joseph Owona		August 26, 1976 (age 48)	2.05 m (6 ft 8 1/2 in)
15	PF	Gaston Essengué		October 10, 1983 (age 41)	2.03 m (6 ft 8 in)

=== Ivory Coast ===
Head coach: Jacques Monclar

#	Pos	Name	Club	Date of Birth	Height
4	PG	Mickael Toti	(France) St-Vallier Basket	April 11, 1987 (age 37)	1.81 m (5 ft 11 1/2 in)
5	PG	Mouloukou Diabate	(France) Chorale Roanne	July 21, 1987 (age 37)	1.82 m (5 ft 11 1/2 in)
6	SG	Errick Davon Craven	(France) Dijon Basket	July 4, 1983 (age 41)	1.82 m (5 ft 11 1/2 in)
7	SF	Mamadi Melameka Diane		November 9, 1986 (age 38)	1.98 m (6 ft 6 in)
8	SG	Kinidinnin Konate	(Ivory Coast) Abidjan BC	August 23, 1980 (age 44)	1.88 m (6 ft 2 in)
9	PF	Mamdou Lamizana	(Lebanon) Al Riyadi Beirut	January 22, 1981 (age 44)	2.08 m (6 ft 10 in)
10	SF	Ismaël N'Diaye	(Switzerland) Boncourt BC	April 20, 1982 (age 42)	1.98 m (6 ft 6 in)
11	C	Abdoulaye Diaby	(Spain) CB Valls	January 29, 1980 (age 45)	2.06 m (6 ft 9 in)
12	PF	Jonathan Kale	(Spain) Ourense	October 18, 1985 (age 39)	2.03 m (6 ft 8 in)
13	PF	Eric Tape	(France) Stade Rodez	October 25, 1981 (age 43)	1.98 m (6 ft 6 in)
14	SF	Guy Edi	(United States) Gonzaga University	December 26, 1988 (age 36)	1.96 m (6 ft 5 in)
15	C	Mohamed Kone	(France) Chorale Roanne	March 24, 1981 (age 43)	2.11 m (6 ft 11 in)

=== Egypt ===
Head coach: (Serbia) Miodrag Perisic

#	Pos	Name	Club	Date of Birth	Height
4	PG	Mohanad El-Sabbagh	(Egypt) Al-Ittihad	December 20, 1981 (age 43)	1.81 m (5 ft 11 1/2 in)
5	G	Amr Gendy		June 14, 1991 (age 33)	1.93 m (6 ft 4 in)
6	G	Ramy Genedy	(Egypt) Gezira	December 20, 1981 (age 43)	1.86 m (6 ft 1 in)
7	PF	Assem Ahmed	(Egypt) Zamalek	June 16, 1992 (age 32)	2.06 m (6 ft 9 in)
8	SF	Moamen Abou El Einen	(Egypt) Al-Ittihad	June 25, 1986 (age 38)	1.95 m (6 ft 5 in)
9	SG	Ibrahim El-Gammal	(Egypt) Al-Ahly	March 23, 1988 (age 36)	1.89 m (6 ft 2 1/2 in)
10	PG	Motaz Okasha	(Egypt) Zamalek	February 14, 1990 (age 35)	1.86 m (6 ft 1 in)
11	C	Mohamed Adly	(Egypt) Al-Ahly	June 17, 1987 (age 37)	2.10 m (6 ft 10 1/2 in)
12	PF	Mark Aziz	(Egypt) Al-Ittihad	March 21, 1986 (age 38)	2.02 m (6 ft 7 1/2 in)
13	SF	Tarek El-Sabbagh	(Egypt) Al-Ittihad	May 26, 1985 (age 39)	1.90 m (6 ft 3 in)
14	PF	Mohamed El-Kerdany	(Egypt) Gezira	April 24, 1977 (age 47)	1.95 m (6 ft 5 in)
15	C	Ramy Ibrahim	(Egypt) Al-Ittihad	February 6, 1988 (age 37)	2.05 m (6 ft 8 1/2 in)

=== South Africa ===
Head coach:

#	Pos	Name	Club	Date of Birth	Height
4	PG	Nhlanhla Dlamini	(South Africa) A.P.N. Durban	September 2, 1986 (age 38)	1.73 m (5 ft 8 in)
5	G	Brendan Mettler	(South Africa) Cape University	January 10, 1982 (age 43)	1.89 m (6 ft 2 1/2 in)
6	PG	Christopher Avenant	(United States) Northeastern University	April 25, 1991 (age 33)	1.89 m (6 ft 2 1/2 in)
7	PG	Masego Loate	(South Africa) University of Johannesburg	August 19, 1982 (age 42)	1.72 m (5 ft 7 1/2 in)
8	SF	Amogelang Keogatile	(South Africa) University of Johannesburg	October 10, 1987 (age 37)	1.95 m (6 ft 5 in)
9	SF	Thabang Kgwedi	(South Africa) Wild Cats Johannesburg	April 15, 1978 (age 46)	1.98 m (6 ft 6 in)
10	SG	Shane Marhanele	(South Africa) Pretoria Heat	August 28, 1982 (age 42)	1.88 m (6 ft 2 in)
11	F	Lindokuhle Sibankulu	(South Africa) A.P.N. Durban	April 9, 1981 (age 43)	1.97 m (6 ft 5 1/2 in)
12	SF	Neo Mothiba	(South Africa) Pretoria Heat	March 21, 1982 (age 42)	2.00 m (6 ft 6 1/2 in)
13	C	Cedrick Kalombo	(Mozambique) Ferroviário Maputo	June 2, 1983 (age 41)	2.08 m (6 ft 10 in)
14	C	Christopher Gabriel	(United States) University of San Diego	December 19, 1988 (age 36)	2.14 m (7 ft 1/2 in)
15	SF	Kegorapetse Letsebe	(South Africa) University of Johannesburg	October 14, 1980 (age 44)	1.98 m (6 ft 6 in)

== Group D ==
=== Central African Republic ===
Head coach: Adel Tlatli

#	Pos	Name	Club	Date of Birth	Height
4	PG	Antoine Kouloumba-Foro	(France) AS Tresses	May 10, 1983 (age 41)	1.82 m (5 ft 11 1/2 in)
5	G	Yannick Zachée	(France) GET Vosges	October 29, 1986 (age 38)	1.92 m (6 ft 3 1/2 in)
6	PG	Michael Mokongo	(Spain) CB Breogán	July 11, 1986 (age 38)	1.80 m (5 ft 11 in)
7	F	William Kossangue	(United States) Campbell University	May 9, 1986 (age 38)	1.97 m (6 ft 5 1/2 in)
8	SG	Lionel Bomayako	(Switzerland) Zürich Wildcats	September 15, 1978 (age 46)	1.95 m (6 ft 5 in)
9	G	Guy Kodjo-Sitchi	(France) Martigues Sports	July 20, 1985 (age 39)	1.91 m (6 ft 3 in)
10	F	Régis Koundjia	(France) CO Le Puy	November 8, 1983 (age 41)	2.03 m (6 ft 8 in)
11	PF	Lionel Pehoua	(United States) Hampton University	September 4, 1982 (age 42)	1.96 m (6 ft 5 in)
12	PF	Maxime Zianveni	(France) STB Le Havre	December 29, 1979 (age 45)	1.98 m (6 ft 6 in)
13	F	Max Kouguere	(Switzerland) Geneve Basket	March 12, 1987 (age 38)	1.99 m (6 ft 6 1/2 in)
14	C	James Mays	(Turkey) Oyak Renault	March 8, 1986 (age 39)	2.08 m (6 ft 10 in)
15	PF	Jimmy Djimrabaye	(France) JA Vichy	April 8, 1992 (age 32)	2.03 m (6 ft 8 in)

=== Rwanda ===
Head coach: Veceslav Kavedzija

#	Pos	Name	Club	Date of Birth	Height
4		Aboubacar Barame		April 26, 1984 (age 40)
5		Aristide Mugabe		February 11, 1988 (age 37)
6		Jean Louis Habineza		December 6, 1983 (age 41)
7		Ellis Kayijuka		April 30, 1981 (age 43)
8		Cameron Bradley		February 27, 1991 (age 34)
9		Mathieu Miller		December 11, 1982 (age 42)
10		Hamza Ruhezamihigo		March 27, 1985 (age 39)
11	C	Robert Thomson		January 28, 1982 (age 43)
12		Kenneth Gasana		November 9, 1984 (age 40)
13		Kami Kabangu		July 2, 1984 (age 40)
14		Matthew Matthew		December 11, 1982 (age 42)
15		Daniel Rugamba		March 16, 1987 (age 38)

=== Togo ===
Head coach: Adel Tlatli

#	Pos	Name	Club	Date of Birth	Height
4	C	Rachidi Soulemana	(Togo) Fighters Lomé	September 3, 1983 (age 41)	2.02 m (6 ft 7 1/2 in)
5	F	Fatarh Damtaré	(Togo) Fighters Lomé	December 29, 1983 (age 41)	1.95 m (6 ft 5 in)
6	SF	Yao Midodji	(Togo) Swallows Lomé	May 21, 1987 (age 37)	1.98 m (6 ft 6 in)
7	PG	Sarahbil Boucari		March 5, 1985 (age 40)	1.90 m (6 ft 3 in)
8	SG	Edem Pinheiro	(Togo) Swallows Lomé	April 14, 1981 (age 43)	1.85 m (6 ft 1 in)
9	PG	Komi Ayayi	(Togo) Swallows Lomé	October 30, 1986 (age 38)	1.79 m (5 ft 10 1/2 in)
10	F	Messan Kokou Doe-Bruce	(Togo) Modèle Lomé	July 2, 1986 (age 38)	1.96 m (6 ft 5 in)
11	G	Komi Tinin Kouigan	(Togo) Racing Club Lomé	August 4, 1984 (age 40)	1.94 m (6 ft 4 1/2 in)
12	SG	Jimmy Williams		May 27, 1986 (age 38)	1.96 m (6 ft 5 in)
13	C	Hassane Fofana	(Togo) Racing Club Lomé	April 19, 1983 (age 41)	2.05 m (6 ft 8 1/2 in)
14	PF	Fofana Saibou	(Togo) Swallows Lomé	November 11, 1986 (age 38)	2.00 m (6 ft 6 1/2 in)
15	C	Mouctar Diaby		December 31, 1985 (age 39)	2.04 m (6 ft 8 1/2 in)

=== Tunisia ===
Head coach: Adel Tlatli

#	Pos	Name	Club	Date of Birth	Height
4	PF	Radhouane Slimane	(United Arab Emirates) An Nasr Dubai	August 16, 1980 (age 44)	2.05 m (6 ft 8 1/2 in)
5	SG	Marouan Laghnej	(Tunisia) JS Kairouan	April 22, 1986 (age 38)	1.90 m (6 ft 3 in)
6	G/F	Amine Maghrebi	(Tunisia) Ezzahra Sport Rades	July 31, 1984 (age 40)	1.96 m (6 ft 5 in)
7	G	Mourad El Mabrouk	(Tunisia) Ezzahra Sport Rades	October 19, 1986 (age 38)	1.85 m (6 ft 1 in)
8	PG	Marouan Kechrid	(Morocco) ASE Essaouira	June 2, 1981 (age 43)	1.76 m (5 ft 9 1/2 in)
9	PF	Mohamed Hdidane	(Tunisia) Stade Nabeulien	April 27, 1986 (age 38)	2.06 m (6 ft 9 in)
10	G	Lassaad Chouaya	(Tunisia) Club Africain	August 22, 1989 (age 35)	1.90 m (6 ft 3 in)
11	SF	Mokhtar Ghyaza	(Tunisia) Ezzahra Sport Rades	November 15, 1986 (age 38)	2.03 m (6 ft 8 in)
12	PF	Makrem Ben Romdhane	(Tunisia) Étoile Sportive Sahel	March 27, 1989 (age 35)	2.05 m (6 ft 8 1/2 in)
13	SG	Amine Rzig	(Tunisia) Stade Nabeulien	August 25, 1980 (age 44)	1.98 m (6 ft 6 in)
14	G	Zied Toumi	(Tunisia) Étoile Sportive Sahel	July 17, 1985 (age 39)	1.92 m (6 ft 3 1/2 in)
15	C	Salah Mejri	(Tunisia) Étoile Sportive Sahel	June 15, 1986 (age 38)	2.16 m (7 ft 1 in)

== See also ==
- 2011 FIBA Africa Clubs Champions Cup squads
