= AfroBasket 2011 =

Tournament details
- Host country: Madagascar
- City: Antananarivo
- Dates: August 17–28
- Teams: 16
- Venue: 1 (in 1 host city)

Final positions
- Champions: Tunisia (1st title)
- Runners-up: Angola
- Third place: Nigeria
- Fourth place: Ivory Coast

Tournament statistics
- MVP: (Tunisia) Salah Mejri
- Top scorer: (Senegal) Mouhammad Faye (21.7 points per game)

AfroBasket 2011 was the 26th FIBA Africa Championship, played under the auspices of the Fédération Internationale de Basketball, the basketball sport governing body, and the African zone thereof. At stake is the berth allocated to Africa in the 2012 Summer Olympics basketball tournament. The tournament was scheduled to be hosted by Côte d'Ivoire, with games to be played in Abidjan. However, in 2011 Madagascar was chosen as host replacement due to a political crisis in Côte d'Ivoire.

Tunisia won the title for the first time after defeating Angola 67–56 in the final.

== Host Selection Process ==
Côte d'Ivoire's selection as the host country was decided by the Fédération Internationale de Basketball (FIBA) Executive Committee, approved by the Central Board of FIBA Africa, and officially announced in Abidjan on March 23, 2010. Côte d'Ivoire's bid was selected over bids from Madagascar and Nigeria. Madagascar was on hold as a backup host should Côte d'Ivoire not be able to host the championships. This would have been the second time that Côte d'Ivoire has hosted the FIBA Africa Championship, after they won the tournament as hosts in 1985. On April 26, 2011, it was announced that Madagascar would host the tournament in its capital Antananarivo after the political unrest in Côte d'Ivoire put them irreparably behind schedule in outfitting their arenas.

== Venue ==
Antananarivo	AfroBasket 2011 (Madagascar)
University of Antananarivo	AfroBasket 2011 (Madagascar)
Capacity: 2,000	AfroBasket 2011 (Madagascar)

== Qualification ==
Participants were sixteen national basketball teams among the 53 FIBA Africa members, determined through qualification processes before the final tournament. These teams included the host nation, the top four sides at the FIBA Africa Championship 2009 in Libya (including Côte d'Ivoire, which finished second at the 2009 tournament) and the top twelve sides at the 2009 Zone preliminary basketball competitions. Because the qualification process doubles as qualification for the 2010 All-Africa Games, all African nations competed in qualifying, including those that have previously qualified for the tournament. The following national teams have secured qualification:

Number	Team	Qualified as	Finals Appearance	Last Appearance
1	Madagascar	Host	3rd	2003
2	Angola	1st place FIBA Africa Championship 2009	17th	2009
3	Tunisia	3rd place FIBA Africa Championship 2009	19th	2009
4	Cameroon	4th place FIBA Africa Championship 2009	6th	2009
5	Nigeria	Zone 3 Winner	15th	2009
6	Togo	Zone 3 Third Place	4th	1978
7	Senegal	Zone 2 Winner	25th	2009
8	Mali	Zone 2 Runner-Up	16th	2009
9	Morocco	Zone 1 Winner	17th	2009
10	Central African Republic	Zone 4 Winner	16th	2009
11	Chad	Zone 4 Runner-Up	1st	-
12	Mozambique	Zone 6 Winner	11th	2009
13	Rwanda	Zone 5 Winner	3rd	2009
14	Ivory Coast	2nd place FIBA Africa Championship 2009	20th	2009
15	Egypt	Wild Card	20th	2009
16	South Africa	Wild Card	8th	2009

== Format ==
FIBA Africa debuted a revised format at the 2009 championship. As of August 2010, FIBA Africa has given no indication that this formation will change for the 2011 event:

- The teams were divided into four groups (Groups A–D) for the preliminary round.
- Round robin for the preliminary round; all teams advanced to the next round.
- From there on a knockout system was used until the final.

== Group stage ==
All Times are UTC+3

=== Group A ===
Team	Pld	W	L	PF	PA	PD	Pts
Nigeria	3	3	0	274	203	+71	6
Mali	3	2	1	205	216	−11	5
Mozambique	3	1	2	209	217	−8	4
Madagascar	3	0	3	211	263	−52	3

17 August 2011
15:00

Report

Nigeria	84–59	Mali
Scoring by quarter: 20–22, 18–5, 18–14, 28–18
Pts: Obasohan 15; Rebs: Ukeagu, Oyedeji 8 Asts: Umeh 3		Pts: Tangara 17; Rebs: Samake 7 Asts: five players 1

University of Antananarivo, Antananarivo

17 August 2011
17:30

Report

Madagascar	67–77	Mozambique
Scoring by quarter: 12–18, 14–18, 23–18, 18–23
Pts: Razafimahasahy 18; Rebs: Ramsdell 14; Asts: three players 2		Pts: Nuaila 15; Rebs: Nuaila 13; Asts: Mucavel 4

University of Antananarivo, Antananarivo

19 August 2011
15:00

Report

Mozambique	63–78	Nigeria
Scoring by quarter: 11–20, 21–23, 14–18, 17–17
Pts: Matos 20; Rebs: Nuaila 5 Asts: Mandlate 3		Pts: Udoka 13; Rebs: Udoka 10; Asts: Udoka 11

University of Antananarivo, Antananarivo

19 August 2011
17:30

Report

Madagascar	63–74	Mali
Scoring by quarter: 23–14, 7–13, 17–23, 16–24
Pts: Rakotoarisoa 19; Rebs: Kilobo 5 Asts: Rakotondrasolo 4		Pts: Niakate 28; Rebs: Tangara 10; Asts: Coulibaly 3

University of Antananarivo, Antananarivo

21 August 2011
12:00

Report

Mali	72–69 (2OT)	Mozambique
Scoring by quarter: 12–14, 17–6, 15–27, 15–12, Overtime: 6–6, 7–4
Pts: Coulibaly 15; Rebs: Samake 11; Asts: Sy 5		Pts: Muchate 21; Rebs: Muchate 20; Asts: Mandlate 3

University of Antananarivo, Antananarivo

21 August 2011
17:30

Report

Nigeria	112–81	Madagascar
Scoring by quarter: 25–19, 30–30, 20–13, 37–19
Pts: Obasohan 21; Rebs: Oyedeji 13; Asts: Udoka 6		Pts: Ramsdell 18; Rebs: Ramsdell 6 Asts: Rakotondrasolo 4

University of Antananarivo, Antananarivo

=== Group B ===
Team	Pld	W	L	PF	PA	PD	Pts
Senegal	3	3	0	256	197	+59	6
Angola	3	2	1	268	202	+68	5
Morocco	3	1	2	215	211	+4	4
Chad	3	0	3	167	296	−129	3

18 August 2011
17:30

Report

Morocco	65–79	Senegal
Scoring by quarter: 18–18, 25–11, 11–24, 11–26
Pts: Zouita 19; Rebs: Hachad 10; Asts: Hachad 3		Pts: Ndoye 23; Rebs: Badiane 11; Asts: Dalmeida 5

University of Antananarivo, Antananarivo

18 August 2011
20:00

Report

Angola	115–56	Chad
Scoring by quarter: 35–17, 33–7, 21–13, 26–19
Pts: C.Morais 25; Rebs: Kikas 7 Asts: three players 2		Pts: Mickael 11; Rebs: three players 6 Asts: three players 2

University of Antananarivo, Antananarivo

20 August 2011
12:30

Report

Chad	57–89	Morocco
Scoring by quarter: 17–20, 13–20, 6–17, 21–32
Pts: Mbaindiguim 16; Rebs: Moguena 8 Asts: Mbaindiguim 5		Pts: Zouita 25; Rebs: Kourodu 9 Asts: Zouita 4

University of Antananarivo, Antananarivo

20 August 2011
20:00

Report

Angola	78–85	Senegal
Scoring by quarter: 30–18, 14–28, 21–24, 13–15
Pts: C.Morais 23; Rebs: Armando 8 Asts: Armando 3		Pts: Ndoye 22; Rebs: Badiane 7 Asts: Faye 5

University of Antananarivo, Antananarivo

22 August 2011
15:00

Report

Senegal	92–54	Chad
Scoring by quarter: 12–11, 22–10, 29–13, 29–20
Pts: Diasse 31; Rebs: Diasse 10; Asts: Dalmeida, Faye 4		Pts: Djimassal 15; Rebs: Moguena, Djimassal 6 Asts: Noubaramadji 3

University of Antananarivo, Antananarivo

22 August 2011
20:00

Report

Morocco	61–75	Angola
Scoring by quarter: 16–15, 16–24, 18–22, 11–14
Pts: Hachad 14; Rebs: Rhalimi 9 Asts: El Mesbahi 3		Pts: Armando 21; Rebs: Vander 9 Asts: Armando 4

University of Antananarivo, Antananarivo

=== Group C ===
Team	Pld	W	L	PF	PA	PD	Pts	Tiebreaker
Cameroon	3	3	0	259	216	+43	6	
Ivory Coast	3	1	2	250	211	+39	4	1–1, +45
Egypt	3	1	2	231	242	−11	4	1–1, +4
South Africa	3	1	2	189	260	−71	4	1–1, −49

17 August 2011
12:30

Report

Ivory Coast	105–53	South Africa
Scoring by quarter: 27–8, 33–10, 29–19, 16–16
Pts: Edi 19; Rebs: N'Diaye, Edi 5 Asts: Kale 5		Pts: Loate 10; Rebs: Avenant 5 Asts: Letsebe 3

University of Antananarivo, Antananarivo

17 August 2011
20:00

Report

Cameroon	96–81	Egypt
Scoring by quarter: 27–11, 25–24, 24–28, 20–18
Pts: Bitee 29; Rebs: Aboya 9 Asts: Bitee 7		Pts: El Gendy, Ibrahim 13; Rebs: El Gendy 5 Asts: Genedy 3

University of Antananarivo, Antananarivo

19 August 2011
12:30

Report

South Africa	65–87	Cameroon
Scoring by quarter: 17–23, 13–17, 11–24, 24–23
Pts: Marhanele 24; Rebs: Gabriel 6 Asts: Dlamini 4		Pts: Essengué 18; Rebs: Aboya 8 Asts: Bayang, Bitee 3

University of Antananarivo, Antananarivo

19 August 2011
20:00

Report

Ivory Coast	75–82	Egypt
Scoring by quarter: 19–13, 16–27, 17–14, 23–28
Pts: Konate 16; Rebs: Kale 9 Asts: Toti 3		Pts: El-Gammal 21; Rebs: Ahmed 7 Asts: El-Gammal 3

University of Antananarivo, Antananarivo

21 August 2011
15:00

Report

Egypt	68–71	South Africa
Scoring by quarter: 22–11, 17–13, 16–29, 13–18
Pts: Gunady 21; Rebs: three Players 7 Asts: El-Kerdany 4		Pts: Gabriel 14; Rebs: Gabriel 11; Asts: Mettler 4

University of Antananarivo, Antananarivo

21 August 2011
20:00

Report

Cameroon	76–70	Ivory Coast
Scoring by quarter: 18–11, 24–22, 20–19, 14–18
Pts: Essengué 19; Rebs: Essengué 7 Asts: five players 1		Pts: Edi 13; Rebs: Edi 7 Asts: Diabate 8

University of Antananarivo, Antananarivo

=== Group D ===
Team	Pld	W	L	PF	PA	PD	Pts
Tunisia	3	3	0	237	145	+92	6
Central African Republic	3	2	1	223	183	+40	5
Rwanda	3	1	2	185	225	−40	4
Togo	3	0	3	180	272	−92	3

18 August 2011
12:30

Report

Tunisia	103–56	Togo
Scoring by quarter: 28–11, 30–16, 25–13, 20–16
Pts: Ben Romdhane 20; Rebs: Ben Romdhane 8 Asts: Slimane 5		Pts: Williams 25; Rebs: Saibou 8 Asts: Boucari, Ayayi 2

University of Antananarivo, Antananarivo

18 August 2011
15:00

Report

Central African Republic	89–61	Rwanda
Scoring by quarter: 26–11, 26–20, 21–14, 16–16
Pts: Mays 24; Rebs: Mays 8 Asts: Mokongo 6		Pts: Bradley 10; Rebs: Thomson 7 Asts: four players 1

University of Antananarivo, Antananarivo

20 August 2011
15:00

Report

Togo	57–82	Central African Republic
Scoring by quarter: 12–22, 19–15, 17–19, 9–26
Pts: Williams 20; Rebs: Saibou 8 Asts: Boucari 4		Pts: Kouguere 24; Rebs: Kossangue 9 Asts: Mokongo 7

University of Antananarivo, Antananarivo

20 August 2011
17:30

Report

Tunisia	69–37	Rwanda
Scoring by quarter: 10–9, 17–7, 19–8, 23–13
Pts: Ben Romdhane 20; Rebs: Hadidane 8 Asts: Laghnej, Kechrid 3		Pts: Kabangu 12; Rebs: Thomson, Kabangu 6 Asts: Mugabe, Thomson 1

University of Antananarivo, Antananarivo

22 August 2011
12:30

Report

Rwanda	87–67	Togo
Scoring by quarter: 27–8, 24–10, 21–23, 15–26
Pts: Gasana 19; Rebs: Bradley 10; Asts: Gasana 9		Pts: Damtaré 12; Rebs: Diaby 6 Asts: Pinheiro 3

University of Antananarivo, Antananarivo

22 August 2011
17:30

Report

Central African Republic	52–65	Tunisia
Scoring by quarter: 13–22, 14–12, 9–8, 16–23
Pts: Mokongo 26; Rebs: Mays 5 Asts: Mays 2		Pts: Slimane 14; Rebs: Mejri 7 Asts: El Mabrouk, Kechrid 4

University of Antananarivo, Antananarivo

== Knockout stage ==
=== Championship bracket ===
All Times are in Local Time UTC+3

Round of 16
Nigeria	84
Chad	46
Central African Republic	71
Egypt	66
Cameroon	85
Togo	52
Angola	82
Mozambique	71
Senegal	92
Madagascar	75
Ivory Coast	80
Rwanda	72
Tunisia	94
South Africa	50
Mali	59
Morocco	80

Quarter-finals
Nigeria	94
Central African Republic	86
Cameroon	83
Angola	84
Senegal	59
Ivory Coast	75
Tunisia	86
Morocco	67

Semi-finals
Nigeria	68
Angola	76
Ivory Coast	57
Tunisia	60

Final
Angola	56
Tunisia	67
Third place
Nigeria	77
Ivory Coast	67

==== Eighth Finals ====
23 August 2011
12:30

Report

Nigeria	84–46	Chad
Scoring by quarter: 23–9, 22–4, 12–16, 27–17
Pts: Udoka 14; Rebs: Ugboaja 10; Asts: three players 4		Pts: Ngadi 17; Rebs: Moguena 10; Asts: three players 2

University of Antananarivo, Antananarivo

23 August 2011
15:00

Report

Cameroon	85–52	Togo
Scoring by quarter: 27–11, 25–24, 24–28, 20–18
Pts: Bitee 16; Rebs: Aboya 7 Asts: Bitee 7		Pts: Doe-Bruce 14; Rebs: Diaby 8 Asts: three players 2

University of Antananarivo, Antananarivo

23 August 2011
17:30

Report

Central African Republic	71–66	Egypt
Scoring by quarter: 18–12, 16–17, 19–13, 18–24
Pts: Mokongo 15; Rebs: Koundjia 17; Asts: Mokongo 4		Pts: El Einen 11; Rebs: Marei, Abdelhalim 7 Asts: Gunady 3

University of Antananarivo, Antananarivo

23 August 2011
20:00

Report

Angola	82–71	Mozambique
Scoring by quarter: 21–15, 18–17, 25–20, 18–19
Pts: C.Morais 25; Rebs: Vander, Kikas 8 Asts: Kikas 4		Pts: Canivete 13; Rebs: Muchate 5 Asts: Mandlate, Matos 3

University of Antananarivo, Antananarivo

24 August 2011
12:30

Report

Ivory Coast	80–72	Rwanda
Scoring by quarter: 17–19, 16–25, 25–18, 22–10
Pts: Edi 34; Rebs: Kone 7 Asts: Diabate 5		Pts: Gasana 30; Rebs: Bradley 9 Asts: three players 3

University of Antananarivo, Antananarivo

24 August 2011
15:00

Report

Tunisia	94–50	South Africa
Scoring by quarter: 17–13, 24–13, 27–10, 26–14
Pts: Chouaya 16; Rebs: Hadidane, Ben Romdhane 8 Asts: Laghnej 7		Pts: Marhanele 15; Rebs: three players 5 Asts: four players 1

University of Antananarivo, Antananarivo

24 August 2011
17:30

Report

Senegal	92–75	Madagascar
Scoring by quarter: 26–13, 21–19, 25–20, 20–23
Pts: Faye 19; Rebs: Coly 8 Asts: Dalmeida 6		Pts: Ramsdell 19; Rebs: Zayad 8 Asts: Rakotondrasolo 4

University of Antananarivo, Antananarivo

24 August 2011
20:00

Report

Mali	59–80	Morocco
Scoring by quarter: 20–11, 8–22, 20–24, 11–14
Pts: Coulibaly 20; Rebs: Tangara 7 Asts: Sy 5		Pts: Najah, Zouita 15; Rebs: Najah 10; Asts: El Mesbahi 7

University of Antananarivo, Antananarivo

==== Quarterfinals ====
25 August 2011
12:30

Report

Nigeria	94–86	Central African Republic
Scoring by quarter: 28–19, 20–18, 25–20, 21–29
Pts: Obasohan 24; Rebs: Udoka 7 Asts: Udoka 8		Pts: Mays 21; Rebs: Kouguere, Mays 5 Asts: Zachée 7

University of Antananarivo, Antananarivo

25 August 2011
15:00

Report

Senegal	59–75	Ivory Coast
Scoring by quarter: 22–11, 6–21, 16–20, 15–23
Pts: Faye 21; Rebs: Badiane 9 Asts: Ndoye 5		Pts: Diane 17; Rebs: Kale, Kone 12; Asts: Toti, Diabate 4

University of Antananarivo, Antananarivo

25 August 2011
17:30

Report

Tunisia	86–67	Morocco
Scoring by quarter: 17–11, 22–13, 22–18, 25–25
Pts: Rzig 16; Rebs: Mejri 13; Asts: Slimane 4		Pts: Khalfi 12; Rebs: Najah 7 Asts: Khalfi, Hachad 3

University of Antananarivo, Antananarivo

25 August 2011
20:00

Report

Cameroon	83–84 (OT)	Angola
Scoring by quarter: 24–24, 22–12, 13–19, 17–21, Overtime: 7–8
Pts: Bayang 28; Rebs: Aboya 10; Asts: Bitee 4		Pts: C.Morais 23; Rebs: Kikas 10; Asts: Armando 4

University of Antananarivo, Antananarivo

==== Semifinals ====
27 August 2011
16:00

Report

Ivory Coast	57–60	Tunisia
Scoring by quarter: 16–22, 14–11, 16–15, 11–12
Pts: Craven, Kone 11; Rebs: Craven 6 Asts: Diabate, Edi 2		Pts: Ben Romdhane 15; Rebs: Mejri 12; Asts: Kechrid 5

University of Antananarivo, Antananarivo

27 August 2011
18:30

Report

Nigeria	68–76	Angola
Scoring by quarter: 23–15, 14–22, 19–17, 12–22
Pts: Ugboaja 16; Rebs: Ugboaja 13; Asts: Udoka 5		Pts: Kikas, Mingas 15; Rebs: Leonel 6 Asts: Armando 8

University of Antananarivo, Antananarivo

==== Bronze medal game ====
28 August 2011
16:00

Report

Nigeria	77–67	Ivory Coast
Scoring by quarter: 20–17, 20–10, 18–23, 19–17
Pts: Obasohan 19; Rebs: Ugboaja 10; Asts: Obasohan 5		Pts: Craven, Kone 14; Rebs: Kone 8 Asts: Diabate 7

University of Antananarivo, Antananarivo

==== Final ====
28 August 2011
18:30

Report

Angola	56–67	Tunisia
Scoring by quarter: 9–21, 20–19, 12–14, 15–13
Pts: C.Morais 17; Rebs: Armando 8 Asts: Armando, Miller 2		Pts: Kechrid 21; Rebs: Mejri 15; Asts: three players 2

University of Antananarivo, Antananarivo

=== 5–8th place bracket ===
Semifinals
26 August
Central African Republic	20
Cameroon	0
26 August
Senegal	96
Morocco	75

Fifth place
27 August
Central African Republic	71
Senegal	93
Seventh place
27 August
Cameroon	69
Morocco	67

==== Semifinals ====
26 August 2011
09:00

Central African Republic	20–0	Cameroon

University of Antananarivo, Antananarivo

26 August 2011
11:30

Report

Senegal	96–75	Morocco
Scoring by quarter: 29–11, 24–22, 20–17, 23–25
Pts: Faye 32; Rebs: Badiane 16; Asts: Coly 4		Pts: Kourdou 14; Rebs: Kourdou 7 Asts: Khalfi 4

University of Antananarivo, Antananarivo

==== Seventh place game ====
27 August 2011
09:00

Report

Cameroon	69–67	Morocco
Scoring by quarter: 12–14, 19–16, 19–17, 19–20
Pts: Essengué 14; Rebs: Owona 12; Asts: Bitee, Essengué 4		Pts: Najah 19; Rebs: Kourdou 6 Asts: Khalfi, Rafai 5

University of Antananarivo, Antananarivo

==== Fifth place game ====
27 August 2011
11:30

Report

Central African Republic	71–93	Senegal
Scoring by quarter: 16–18, 12–26, 22–27, 21–22
Pts: Koundjia 22; Rebs: Koundjia 7 Asts: Kouloumba-Foro 3		Pts: Faye 29; Rebs: Badiane 17; Asts: Dalmeida 7

University of Antananarivo, Antananarivo

=== Placement games ===
25 August 2011
09:00

Report

Togo	62–63	Chad
Scoring by quarter: 19–22, 8–15, 20–19, 15–7
Pts: Williams 21; Rebs: Diaby 16; Asts: Boucari 5		Pts: Moguena 14; Rebs: Mbaindiguim 10; Asts: Noubaramadji 6

University of Antananarivo, Antananarivo

25 August 2011
11:30

Report

Egypt	76–66	Rwanda
Scoring by quarter: 19–14, 16–15, 20–11, 21–26
Pts: El-Kerdany 19; Rebs: El-Gammal 11; Asts: El-Gammal, Okasha 3		Pts: Gasana 19; Rebs: Miller 9 Asts: Gasana 6

University of Antananarivo, Antananarivo

25 August 2011
14:00

Report

Mali	61–55	Mozambique
Scoring by quarter: 7–9, 23–14, 17–14, 14–18
Pts: Soumaoro 16; Rebs: Soumaoro, Tangara 10; Asts: three players 3		Pts: Muchate 14; Rebs: Muchate 7 Asts: Muchate 3

University of Antananarivo, Antananarivo

25 August 2011
16:30

Report

South Africa	61–82	Madagascar
Scoring by quarter: 18–13, 14–23, 12–21, 17–25
Pts: Mettler 18; Rebs: Mothiba 15; Asts: Avenant 2		Pts: Ramsdell 22; Rebs: Ramsdell 17; Asts: Andrianjafy 6

University of Antananarivo, Antananarivo

== Awards ==
2011 FIBA Africa Championship winners

Tunisia
First title

Most Valuable Player
(Tunisia) Salah Mejri

=== All-Tournament Team ===
- (Tunisia) Marouan Kechrid
- (Angola) Carlos Morais
- (Nigeria) Ime Udoka
- (Tunisia) Makrem Ben Romdhane
- (Tunisia) Salah Mejri

== Final standings ==
Qualified for the 2012 Summer Olympics
Qualified for the FIBA World Olympic Qualifying Tournament

Rank	Team
1	Tunisia
2	Angola
3	Nigeria
4	Ivory Coast
5	Senegal
6	Central African Republic
7	Cameroon
8	Morocco
9	Mali
10	Mozambique
11	Egypt
12	Rwanda
13	Madagascar
14	South Africa
15	Chad
16	Togo

== Statistical leaders ==
Points

Name	PPG
(Senegal) Mouhammad Faye	21.7
(Angola) Carlos Morais	17.7
(Nigeria) Derrick Obasohan (Togo) Jimmy Williams	16.6
(Rwanda) Kenneth Gasana	16.4

Rebounds

Name	RPG
(Senegal) Malick Badiane	11.0
(Tunisia) Salah Mejri	9.0
(Madagascar) Charles Ramsdell	8.8
(Nigeria) Ejike Ugboaja	8.6
(Mali) Mohamed Tangara	8.4

Assists

Name	APG
(Nigeria) Ime Udoka	5.3
(Ivory Coast) Mouloukou Diabate (Central African Republic) Michael Mokongo	5.0
(Cameroon) Parfait Bitee	4.3
(Senegal) Xane Dalmeida	4.0

Blocks

Name	BPG
(Tunisia) Salah Mejri	2.4
(Rwanda) Robert Thomson	1.5
(Mali) Mamadou Diarra	1.4
(Senegal) Malick Badiane	1.2
(Senegal) Babacar Toure	1.1

Steals

Name	SPG
(Central African Republic) Michael Mokongo (Chad) Asnal Noubaramadji	2.4
(Nigeria) Ime Udoka	2.3
(Cameroon) Christian Bayang (Mozambique) Custodio Muchate	2.2

== See also ==
- 2011 FIBA Africa Clubs Champions Cup
