= Stade Gabèsien (basketball) =

- Leagues: Championnat Nationale 1
- Founded: 1957
- Location: Gabès, Tunisia

Stade Gabèsien (basketball) is a Tunisian professional basketball team located in the city of Gabès. Founded in 1957, the team competes in the Championnat National A, the top tier national level.

They have won the Championnat Nationale 1, the national second division, a total of two times, in 2016 and 2019.

== Honours ==
Championnat Nationale 1 (Second Division)

- Champions (2): 2016, 2019

== Notable players ==
Note: Flags indicate national team eligibility at FIBA-sanctioned events. Players may hold other non-FIBA nationalities not displayed.

Criteria

To appear in this section a player must have either:

- Set a club record or won an individual award while at the club
- Played at least one official international match for their national team at any time
- Played at least one official NBA match at any time.

- (Senegal) El Hadji Ndiaye
