= El Hadji Ndiaye =

Senegalese basketball player

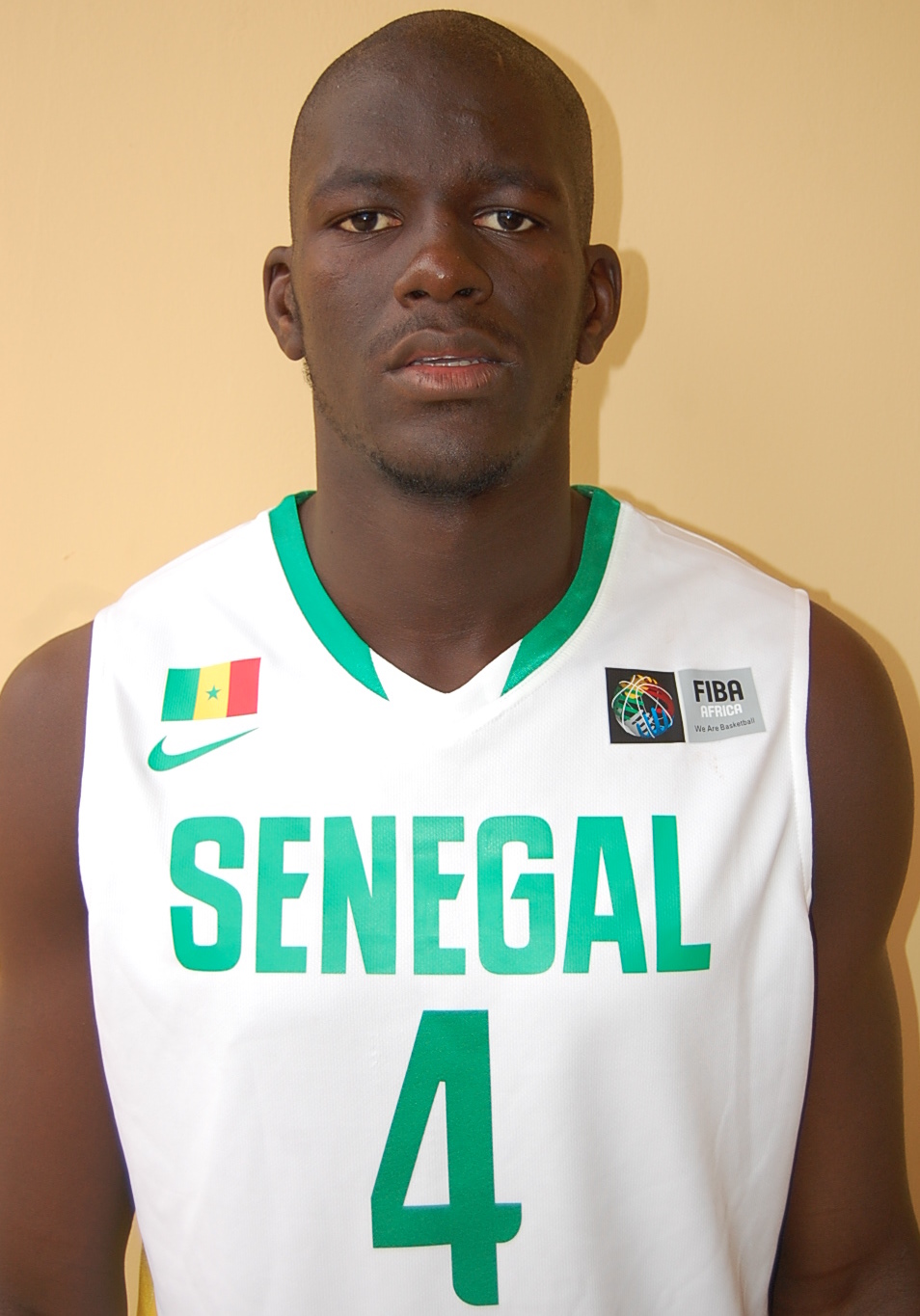
- Ndiaye in 2011.

Personal information
- Born: 18 November 1986 (age 39) Thiès, Senegal
- Listed height: 196 cm (6 ft 5 in)
- Listed weight: 89 kg (196 lb)

Career information
- Playing career: 2004–present
- Position: Shooting guard

Career history
- 2004–2009: DUC Dakar
- 2009–2010: Al-Jubail
- 2010–2011: DUC Dakar
- Stade Gabèsien

El Hadji Malick Ndiaye (born 18 November 1986) is a Senegalese professional basketball player.

He represented Senegal's national basketball team at the 2016 Olympic Qualifiers in the Philippines, where he recorded most steals for his team.
