= Jimmy Williams (basketball player) =

American-born Togolese basketball player

Abidjan Azur
- Position: Guard
- League: Ivorian Basketball Championship

Personal information
- Born: May 27, 1986 (age 40) Chicago, IL, United States
- Listed height: 6 ft 5 in (1.96 m)

Career information
- College: Alderson Broaddus (2006–2008)
- Playing career: 2008–present

Career history
- 2011–2012: Al-Wakrah SC
- 2016–?: Maghreb de Fes
- 2021–present: Abidjan Azur

Jimmy Deandre Deshon Williams (born May 25, 1986) is an American-born Togolese professional basketball player. He currently plays for Abidjan Azur.

== Professional career ==
In May 2021, Williams signed with Abidjan Azur in Ivory Coast.

== National team career ==
Williams represented Togo’s national basketball team at the AfroBasket 2011 in Antananarivo, Madagascar, where he was Togo’s top scorer.
