= Xane D'Almeida =

Senegalese basketball player (born 1983)

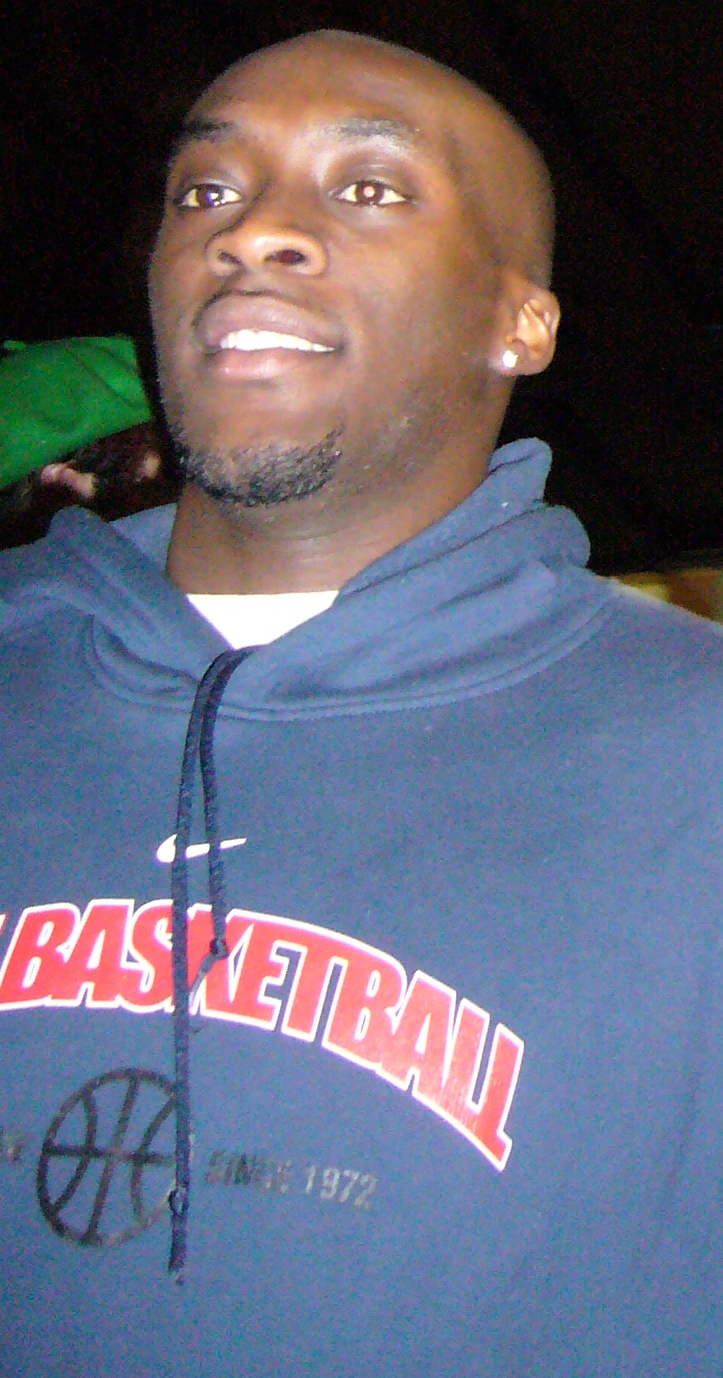
- D'Almeida in 2007

No. 6 – Dax Gamarde basket 40
- Position: Guard
- League: Nationale Masculine 1

Personal information
- Born: 21 January 1983 (age 43) Paris, France
- Listed height: 6 ft 0 in (1.83 m)

Career information
- Playing career: 2003–present

Career history
- 2003–2008: Pau-Orthez
- 2009: Limoges CSP
- 2009–2010: JDA Dijon Basket
- 2011–2012: Limoges CSP
- 2013–2018: Tarbes-Lourdes
- 2018–2019: Étoile Charleville-Mézières
- 2019–present: Dax Gamarde basket 40

Career highlights
- LNB Pro A champion (2004); French Basketball Cup champion (2007)

Xane D'Almeida (born 21 January 1983) is a Senegalese professional basketball player. While playing for Pau-Orthez, he won the 2004 league title and the 2007 French Basketball Cup. Despite being born in Paris, D'Almeida officially represents Senegal in international competition, and has participated in the 2011 FIBA Africa Championship and 2014 FIBA Basketball World Cup. D'Almeida plays both the point guard and shooting guard positions on the court.

== Honours ==
- Coupe de France: 2007
- French champion: 2004
- French Espoirs champion: 2001, 2002, 2003
- Trophée du Futur: 2002, 2004
- Coupe du Sud-Ouest: 2002, 2003, 2004

He was named MVP of the French NM1 Championship in the 2013–14 season on matchdays 20, 28, 30, and 33.
