= James Mays (basketball) =

American basketball player

Salt Lake City Stars
- Title: Assistant coach
- League: NBA G League

Personal information
- Born: March 8, 1986 (age 40) Garner, North Carolina, U.S.
- Listed height: 6 ft 7 in (2.01 m)
- Listed weight: 232 lb (105 kg)

Career information
- High school: Garner Magnet (Garner, North Carolina)
- College: Clemson (2004–2008)
- NBA draft: 2008: undrafted
- Playing career: 2008–2022
- Position: Power forward / center
- Number: 40

Career history

Playing
- 2008: Colorado 14ers
- 2009–2010: Beijing Ducks
- 2010: Caciques de Humacao
- 2010–2011: Oyak Renault
- 2011: Caciques de Humacao
- 2011–2012: Mersin BB
- 2012: Capitanes de Arecibo
- 2012–2013: Springfield Armor
- 2013: Maine Red Claws
- 2013: Sioux Falls Skyforce
- 2014: San Mig Super Coffee Mixers
- 2014–2015: Enel Brindisi
- 2015: Shaanxi Wolves
- 2015–2016: Al Shabab
- 2016: Shaanxi Wolves
- 2016–2017: Changwon LG Sakers
- 2017: Guizhou White Tigers
- 2017: Incheon Electroland Elephants
- 2018: Qingdao Eagles
- 2018: Seoul SK Knights
- 2018–2019: Changwon LG Sakers
- 2019: Shaanxi Wolves
- 2019–2020: Shandong Heroes
- 2021: Piratas de Quebradillas
- 2021–2022: Goyang Orions

Coaching
- 2023–present: Salt Lake City Stars (assistant)

Career highlights
- Korean League champion (2018); Korean League All-Star (2017); Chinese NBL champion (2015); PBA champion (2014 Commissioner's); NBA Development League All-Star (2013)
- Stats at Basketball Reference

James Dixon Mays (born March 8, 1986) is an American-born naturalized Central African former professional basketball player currently working as an assistant coach for the Salt Lake City Stars of the NBA G League. He represented the Central African Republic at the 2011 FIBA Africa Championship.

== High school ==
Mays averaged 20.1 points, 15 rebounds, two steals and two assists per game for Garner High in 2003–04. He shot a strong 54.3 percent from the field that year when he led Garner to the conference championship. A McDonald's All-American nominee as a senior, he was also named MVP of his conference and to the all-conference team. He played in the North Carolina vs. South Carolina High School All-Star game where he played against Clemson classmate Sam Perry. Perry was the top scorer, but Mays was named the MVP. Along with that, he also played in the East vs. West North Carolina Coaches Association All-Star game in July. He scored a season high 30 points against East Wake High School as a senior, but he had a 36-point game as a junior against Southeast Raleigh for his career high. In his junior year, he scored 19.8 points and 11.9 rebounds per game.

== College ==
=== Freshman ===
Mays started eight of the 32 games in which he appeared. Averaged 4.3 points and better than one steal per game.

=== Sophomore ===
Started all 11 games in which he appeared. (Mays was ruled academically ineligible for the second semester). The Tigers posted an 11–0 mark with Mays, and managed just an 8–13 record in his stead. Averaged 9.2 points and a career-best 7.6 rebounds. Posted 19 points and seven rebounds against South Carolina.

=== Junior ===
Mays posted career-bests in points (12.2 ppg), assists (2.7 apg) and steals (1.9 spg); also averaged 6.4 rebounds. Set Clemson single-season records for assists (95) and steals (69) for a frontcourt player. Posted eight double-digit rebounding efforts and seven point-rebound double-doubles. Exemplified his balanced play with an 18-point, nine-rebound, four-assist, five-steal, two-block effort against Monmouth.

=== Senior ===
Fought through a rash of injuries to finish second on the team in rebounds per game, third in steals, while posting a double-digit scoring average. Named to the ACC-All Tournament Second Team after helping the Tigers reach the title game. Led Clemson in rebounding 10 times. Recorded a career-high six steals in a season-opening win against Furman. Tallied a season-high 20 points in a comeback, road win at Maryland. Suffered a broken hand against North Carolina but still produced nine points, eight rebounds, four steals and two blocks.

== Professional career ==
=== 2008 to 2012 seasons ===
Mays was not selected during the 2008 NBA draft. He started his professional career with the Colorado 14ers of the NBA D-League. He signed with the Beijing Ducks of the Chinese Basketball Association (CBA) for the 2009–10 season. In 2010, Mays signed with Caciques de Humacao of the Baloncesto Superior Nacional (BtN), Puerto Rico's top-flight basketball league. For the 2010–11 season, hr signed with Oyak Renault of the Turkish Basketball League (TBL). On July 2, 2011, he signed with Mersin Büyükşehir Belediyesi S.K. in Turkey. With Mersin, he averaged 17.2 points per game, 9 rebounds per game, 2.2 steals per game, and 1 block per game. On May 17, 2011, Mays went to Puerto Rico for the second time, this time signing with Capitanes de Arecibo. He replaced forward/center Ike Diogu. He also represented the Central African Republic at the 2011 FIBA Africa Championship, in August 2011.

=== 2012–13 season ===
Mays began the 2012–13 season with the Springfield Armor of the NBA Development League. On February 4, 2013, Mays was named to the Prospects All-Star roster for the 2013 NBA D-League All-Star Game. On February 10, 2013, Mays was traded to the Maine Red Claws for Kris Joseph. On February 26, 2013, Mays was traded to the Sioux Falls Skyforce in exchange for Gabe Pruitt.

=== 2013 to 2016 seasons ===
Mays signed as import of San Mig Super Coffee Mixers ongoing Commissioners Cup conference. After struggling early on in the conference, he managed to step his game up a notch to help the Coffee Mixers clinch the title, and their 3rd straight championship as well. In July 2014, Mays signed with Enel Brindisi of Lega Serie A.

In 2015, Mays signed with the Shaanxi Wolves of National Basketball League of China, the second tier basketball league in China. In September 2015, he helped Shaanxi Wolves win its first NBL championship. On October 2, 2015, he signed with Al Shabab of the United Arab Emirates D1.

=== 2017 to 2019 seasons ===
He played in the summer of 2017 at Guizhou White Tigers in the NBL. In January 2018, he signed with the Qingdao DoubleStar Eagles of the CBA. On August 31, 2018, Mays signed with Changwon LG Sakers of the Korean league.

== Coaching career ==
On September 20, 2023, Mays joined the Salt Lake City Stars of the NBA G League as an assistant coach.
