= Abderamane Mbaindiguim =

Chadian basketball player

Personal information
- Born: March 1, 1982 (age 44) N'Djamena, Chad
- Listed height: 6 ft 5 in (1.96 m)

Career information
- Playing career: 2010–present
- Position: Small forward

Abderamane Mbaindiguim (born March 1, 1982) is a Chadian professional basketball player. He currently plays for the CSM Constantine Sports Club of the Algerian Basketball Championship. Mbaindiguim is one of Chad's most prominent basketball figures.

He played most minutes and scored most points for the Chad national basketball team at the 2011 FIBA Africa Championship in Antananarivo, Madagascar.

== Career overview ==
Abderamane Mbaindiguim played professional basketball for the following teams:

- 2010–present CSM Constantine (Algeria)
