= Derrick Obasohan =

American-Nigerian professional basketball player

UT Arlington Mavericks
- Title: Assistant coach
- League: WAC

Personal information
- Born: April 18, 1981 (age 45) Houston, Texas, U.S.
- Listed height: 6 ft 7 in (2.01 m)
- Listed weight: 220 lb (100 kg)

Career information
- High school: Alief Elsik (Houston, Texas)
- College: Texas-Arlington (2000–2004)
- NBA draft: 2004: undrafted
- Playing career: 2004–2017
- Position: Shooting guard / small forward
- Number: 13
- Coaching career: 2019–present

Career history

Playing
- 2004–2005: Etzella Ettelbruck
- 2005–2006: Verviers-Pepinster
- 2006: Belenenses Montepio
- 2006–2007: Hyères-Toulon Var Basket
- 2007–2009: Strasbourg IG
- 2009–2010: Hyères-Toulon Var Basket
- 2010–2011: Trabzonspor
- 2011–2012: Joventut
- 2012: Cocodrilos de Caracas
- 2012: Boca Juniors
- 2012–2013: Cholet Basket
- 2013–2015: AS Monaco Basket
- 2015–2017: Provence Basket

Coaching
- 2019–2020, 2023–2024: UT Arlington (GA)
- 2024–present: UT Arlington (assistant)

Career highlights
- French League Best Scorer (2010)
Medals
Men's basketball
Representing Nigeria
FIBA Africa Championship
Bronze medal – third place	2011 Madagascar

Derrick Osamuyi Obasohan (born April 18, 1981) is a Nigerian-American basketball coach and former player. He is currently an assistant coach for his alma mater, the University of Texas at Arlington.

== College career ==
Obasohan played high school basketball at Alief Elsik in Houston, Texas. Obasohan then played college basketball, where he was a First Team All-Southland Conference performer with the Texas–Arlington Mavericks.

== Professional career ==
On May 21, 2010, Obasohan signed with Trabzonspor of Turkey for the 2010–11 season. In 26 games, he averaged 11.7 points and 3.85 rebounds per game.

On September 2, 2011, he signed with Joventut of Spain for the 2011–12 ACB season. In 34 games, he averaged 9.2 points per game.

On May 15, 2012, he signed with the Cocodrilos de Caracas of the Venezuelan LPB. He left Caracas after appearing in only three games.

In the 2012–13 season, he started in Argentina with Boca Juniors, but left after only four games and on November 11, 2012, he signed with Cholet Basket of France for the rest of the season.

In August 2013, he signed with AS Monaco Basket of the French NM1 (third division). In two seasons with Monaco, he helped them to come first to LNB Pro B and then to LNB Pro A league.

In October 2015, he signed with Provence Basket of the LNB Pro B.

== National team career ==
Obasohan represented Nigeria at the 2006 FIBA World Championship in Japan. He won the bronze medal at the 2011 FIBA Africa Championship. He also represented Nigeria at the 2012 Summer Olympics.

== Coaching career ==
Following the conclusion of his playing career, Obasohan returned to UT Arlington as an assistant coach.
