= Boubacar Coly =

Senegalese basketball player

Personal information
- Born: July 11, 1983 (age 42); Ziguinchor, Senegal
- Listed height: 6 ft 9 in (2.06 m)
- Listed weight: 229 lb (104 kg)

Career information
- High school: Oak Hill Academy (Mouth of Wilson, Virginia); Laurinburg Institute (Laurinburg, North Carolina)
- College: Xavier (2004–2006); Morgan State (2006–2008)
- NBA draft: 2008: undrafted
- Playing career: 2008–2013
- Position: Center

Career history
- 2009: Al Ansar
- 2009: Hamamatsu Phoenix
- 2010–2011: GIE Morrow Disciples
- 2011–2013: Moncton Miracles
- 2013: Al Ansar

Career highlights
- NBL Canada All-Defence Second Team (2012); Nukhba Cup champion (2009); First-team All-MEAC (2008); MEAC Defensive Player of the Year (2008)

Boubacar Coly (born July 11, 1983) is a Senegalese former professional basketball player.

== Collegiate career ==
Coly played his first two seasons of college basketball with Xavier, drawing comparisons with former Musketeer Romain Sato, and transferred to Morgan State Bears for his junior and senior years. In 2008, he was named first-team All-Mid-Eastern Athletic Conference (MEAC) and league defensive player of the year.

== Professional career ==
In June 2008, Coly participated in an ACMT EuroExposure camp in Ohio in the United States. In April 2009, he signed with Al Ansar of the Saudi Premier League. He helped the team win the Nukhba Cup. In November of the same year, Coly signed a contract with the Hamamatsu Higashimikawa Phoenix of the bj League in Japan. After playing a total of five games and averaging 1.6 points and 2.8 rebounds, he was released. In December 2010, Coly signed with GIE Morrow Disciples of the Universal Basketball Association (UBA) in the United States and left in January 2011. He then joined the Moncton Miracles for the inaugural 2011–12 National Basketball League of Canada season. Coly was named to the NBL Canada All-Defensive Second Team by the end of the season.

== International career ==
Coly has played for the Senegal national basketball team at the AfroBasket on multiple occasions. He averaged 1.2 points and 3.0 rebounds in 2009 and 5.5 points and 4.0 rebounds in 2011.
