= Charles Ramsdell (basketball) =

Malagasy-American basketball player

Personal information
- Born: January 13, 1985 (age 41) Edmond, Oklahoma
- Listed height: 6 ft 10 in (2.08 m)
- Listed weight: 212 lb (96 kg)

Career information
- High school: Kingfisher (Kingfisher, Oklahoma)
- College: Tulsa (2003–2007)
- NBA draft: 2007: undrafted
- Playing career: 2007–2014
- Position: Power forward / center

Career history
- 2007: Oklahoma Storm
- 2007–2009: Rosalía de Castro
- 2009–2010: Jovent d'Alaior
- 2010–2011: Óbila CB
- 2011–2012: CE Lleida Bàsquet
- 2012–2013: Bàsquet Manresa
- 2013–2014: Gipuzkoa Basket

Charles Ramsdell (born January 13, 1985) is a retired Malagasy-American professional basketball player. His last team as an active player was San Sebastián Gipuzkoa BC of the Spanish Liga ACB.

He played college basketball for University of Tulsa, and also competed in high jump for Tulsa.

He represented Madagascar men's national basketball team at the AfroBasket 2011 in Antananarivo, Madagascar where he recorded most minutes, points, rebounds and blocks for his team.
