= Ime Udoka =

Nigerian-American basketball player and coach (born 1977)

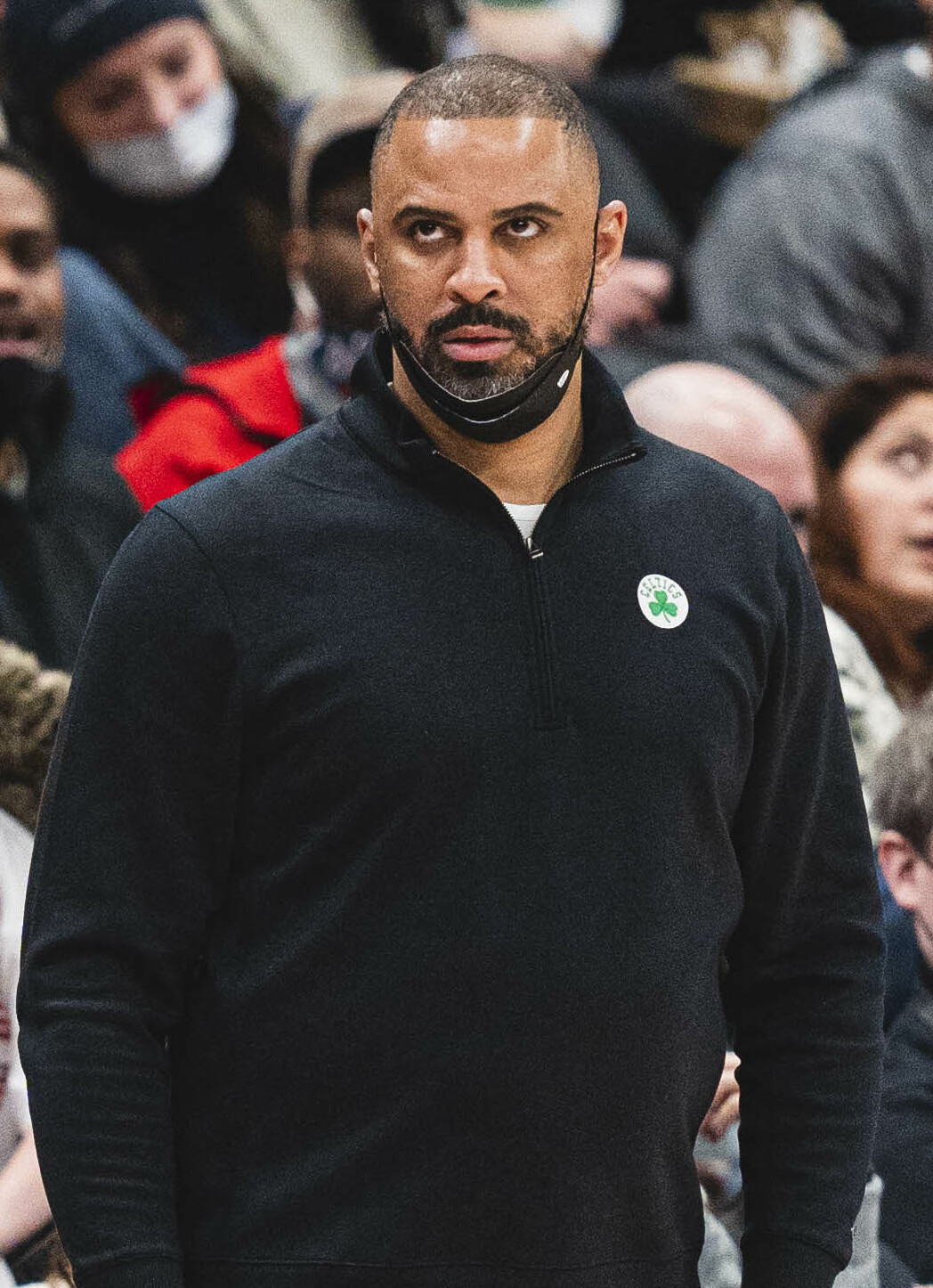
- Udoka with the Boston Celtics in 2022

Houston Rockets
- Title: Head coach
- League: NBA

Personal information
- Born: August 9, 1977 (age 49) Portland, Oregon, U.S.
- Listed height: 6 ft 5 in (1.96 m)
- Listed weight: 220 lb (100 kg)

Career information
- High school: Jefferson (Portland, Oregon)
- College: College of Eastern Utah (1995–1997); San Francisco (1997–1998); Portland State (1999–2000)
- NBA draft: 2000: undrafted
- Playing career: 2000–2012
- Position: Small forward
- Number: 5, 8, 3
- Coaching career: 2012–present

Career history

Playing
- 2000–2001: Fargo-Moorhead Beez
- 2001: Independiente
- 2002–2004: North Charleston / Charleston Lowgators
- 2003: Adirondack Wildcats
- 2004: Los Angeles Lakers
- 2004: Gran Canaria
- 2005: JA Vichy
- 2005–2006: Fort Worth Flyers
- 2006: New York Knicks
- 2006–2007: Portland Trail Blazers
- 2007–2009: San Antonio Spurs
- 2009–2010: Sacramento Kings
- 2010–2011: San Antonio Spurs
- 2012: UCAM Murcia

Coaching
- 2012–2019: San Antonio Spurs (assistant)
- 2019–2020: Philadelphia 76ers (assistant)
- 2020–2021: Brooklyn Nets (assistant)
- 2021–2023: Boston Celtics
- 2023–present: Houston Rockets

Career highlights
- As player: All-NBA D-League First Team (2006); All-NBDL Second Team (2004); As assistant coach: NBA champion (2014)

Career NBA statistics
- Points: 1,635 (5.2 ppg)
- Rebounds: 926 (2.9 rpg)
- Assists: 308 (1.0 apg)
- Stats at NBA.com
- Stats at Basketball Reference
Medals
Men's basketball
Representing Nigeria
African Championships
Bronze medal – third place	2005 Algeria	Nigeria
Bronze medal – third place	2011 Madagascar	Nigeria
Olympic Games
Assistant coach for the United States
Gold medal – first place	2020 Tokyo	Team

Ime Sunday Udoka (/ˈiːmeɪ uːˈdoʊkə/ EE-may ooh-DOH-kə; born August 9, 1977) is an American-Nigerian professional basketball coach and former player who is the head coach for the Houston Rockets of the National Basketball Association (NBA). Born in the United States, he represented the Nigeria national team during his playing career. After retiring as a player, Udoka served as an assistant coach with the San Antonio Spurs, Philadelphia 76ers, and Brooklyn Nets before becoming the head coach of the Boston Celtics, whom he led to the 2022 NBA Finals. In April 2023, Udoka was hired by the Rockets.

== Early life ==
Ime Udoka was born to Vitalis and Agnes Udoka on August 9, 1977, in Portland, Oregon. Vitalis moved to the United States from Nigeria in 1970 while Agnes was an American from Illinois. Udoka attended Jefferson High School in Portland.

== College career ==
Udoka played for College of Eastern Utah and the University of San Francisco before transferring to Portland State University, where he starred for the Vikings.

== Professional career ==
=== Fargo-Moorhead Beez (2000–2001) ===
After going undrafted in the 2000 NBA draft, Udoka began his professional basketball career in the minor leagues, including a stint with the Fargo-Moorhead Beez of the International Basketball Association during the 2000–01 season.

=== Independiente (2001) ===
Udoka played with Independiente in 2001.

=== North Charleston Lowgators (2002–2003) ===
Udoka played with the North Charleston Lowgators from 2002 to 2003.

=== Adirondack Wildcats (2003) ===
Udoka played for the Adirondack Wildcats of the United States Basketball League in 2003, where he averaged 19.4 points and 9.2 rebounds in 15 games.

=== Charleston Lowgators (2003–2004) ===
Udoka played in the NBDL with the Charleston Lowgators, who drafted him with 39th overall pick in the 2002 NBDL Draft.

=== Los Angeles Lakers (2004) ===
On January 14, 2004, Udoka signed a 10-day contract with the Los Angeles Lakers.

=== Fort Worth Flyers (2005–2006) ===
After a stint in Europe, which included a brief summer contract with Žalgiris Kaunas, Lithuanian champions and Euroleague participants, Udoka returned to the United States and was once again drafted in NBDL. This time, he was drafted third overall by the Fort Worth Flyers in the 2005 NBDL Draft. Udoka averaged 17.1 points and 6.2 rebounds per game with the Flyers.

=== New York Knicks (2006) ===
On April 6, 2006, Udoka signed with the New York Knicks. He appeared in eight games, averaging 2.8 points, 2.1 rebounds, and 0.8 assists in 14.3 minutes. Udoka was waived on September 11.

=== Portland Trail Blazers (2006–2007) ===
Udoka was the last player invited to his hometown Portland Trail Blazers' training camp before the 2006–07 season after an opening emerged when Aaron Miles failed his physical. He impressed the coaching staff with his defensive ability and earned a place on the regular-season roster.

After having played in only 12 NBA games in his career, Udoka started all 75 games he played in during the 2006–07 season. Udoka averaged 8.4 points, 3.7 rebounds, 1.5 assists, and 0.9 steals in 28.6 minutes per game.

=== San Antonio Spurs (2007–2009) ===
In 2007, Udoka signed with the San Antonio Spurs. He played in 73 games, averaging 5.8 points, 3.1 rebounds, and 0.9 assists in 18 minutes per game.

In his second season with the Spurs, Udoka played in 67 games and started in three, averaging 4.3 points, 2.8 rebounds, and 0.8 assists in 15.4 minutes per game.

After the 2009 season, Udoka became a free agent and eventually re-signed with the Trail Blazers on September 25, 2009. However, he was waived on October 22.

=== Sacramento Kings (2009–2010) ===
On November 4, 2009, Udoka signed with the Sacramento Kings. He played in 69 games and started in two, averaging 3.6 points, 2.8 rebounds, and 0.8 assists in 13.7 minutes per game.

=== Return to San Antonio (2010–2011) ===
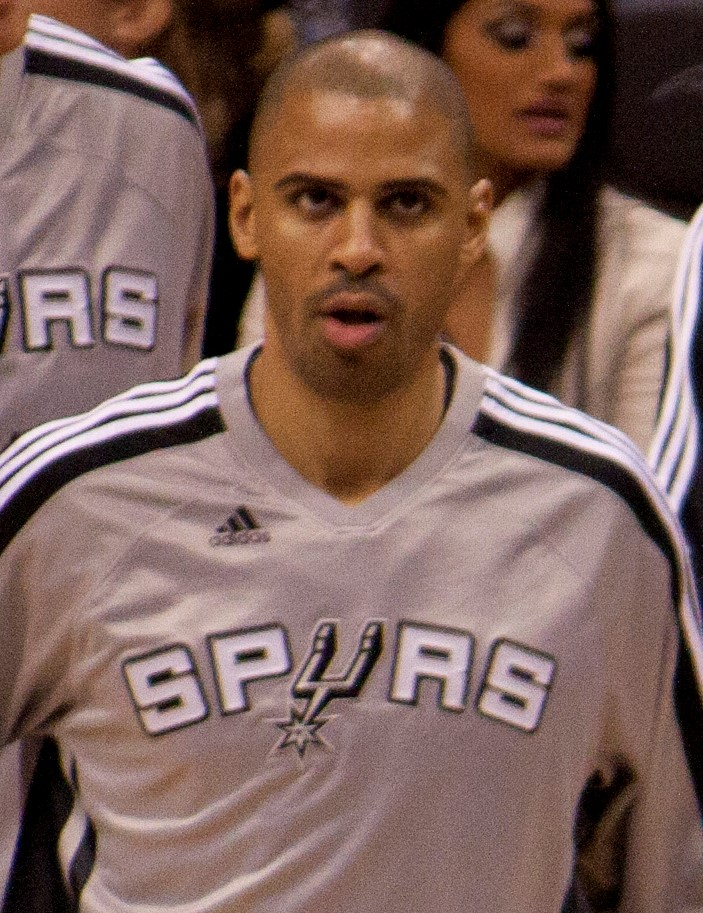
Udoka in 2010

On November 24, 2010, Udoka re-signed with the Spurs. However, he was waived on January 5, 2011, after playing in 20 games and averaging only 0.7 points, 0.9 rebounds, and 0.7 assists in 6.5 minutes per game.

=== New Jersey Nets (2011) ===
On December 15, 2011, Udoka signed with the New Jersey Nets. However, he was waived eight days later and did not appear in any games.

=== UCAM Murcia (2012) ===
On January 5, 2012, Udoka signed with UCAM Murcia of the Spanish Liga ACB.

== Coaching career ==
=== San Antonio Spurs (2012–2019) ===
On August 28, 2012, the San Antonio Spurs hired Udoka as an assistant coach under Gregg Popovich. Udoka won his first NBA championship when the Spurs defeated the Miami Heat in five games during the 2014 NBA Finals. Udoka was also the key for LaMarcus Aldridge's decision to join the Spurs in 2015 as they were teammates on the Portland Trail Blazers during Aldridge's rookie season.

=== Philadelphia 76ers (2019–2020) ===
On June 26, 2019, Udoka was hired as an assistant coach of the Philadelphia 76ers. His head coach on the 76ers at the time, Brett Brown, also coached under Gregg Popovich for the Spurs, and both Udoka and Brown were on the same staff in the 2012–13 season.

=== Brooklyn Nets (2020–2021) ===
On October 30, 2020, the Brooklyn Nets hired Udoka as an assistant coach.

=== Boston Celtics (2021–2023) ===
==== 2021–22 season ====
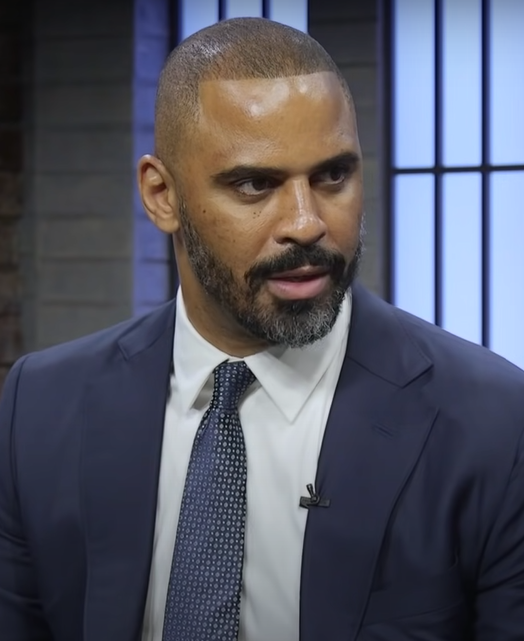
Udoka in 2021

On June 23, 2021, it was reported that the Boston Celtics had hired Udoka as their head coach, replacing Brad Stevens, who was promoted to President of Basketball Operations a few weeks prior. The hiring became official five days later. Udoka became the franchise's sixth African-American head coach, as well as the first head coach of African origin in NBA history. Stevens later stated that he hired Udoka as his own replacement as head coach since Udoka had "a great approachability".

Although the Celtics began the 2021–22 season with an 18–21 record, they began a turnaround in January and finished as the #2-seed in the Eastern Conference with a 51–31 record. During the turnaround, Udoka earned two Eastern Conference Coach of the Month awards, one in February and another for March and April. During the playoffs, the Celtics swept the Brooklyn Nets in the first round before beating the Milwaukee Bucks in seven games during the Eastern Conference Semifinals. The Celtics went on to defeat the Miami Heat in seven games during the Eastern Conference Finals to make their first NBA Finals appearance since 2010. However, the Celtics lost the 2022 NBA Finals to the Golden State Warriors in six games despite a 2–1 lead.

==== 2022–23 season ====
On September 22, 2022, the Celtics suspended Udoka for the entire 2022–23 season for violating team policies. He was disciplined for engaging in an improper intimate relationship with a female staff member. Although the Celtics initially believed that the relationship was consensual, the woman later accused Udoka of making unwanted comments towards her. He issued an apology after being suspended, but Udoka chose not to resign from his position due to the violation. Assistant coach Joe Mazzulla replaced Udoka as interim head coach.

On February 16, 2023, Mazzulla was named the team's permanent head coach after leading the Celtics to a league-best 42–17 record at the NBA All-Star break, signaling the end of Udoka's tenure in Boston.

=== Houston Rockets (2023–present) ===
==== 2023–24 season ====
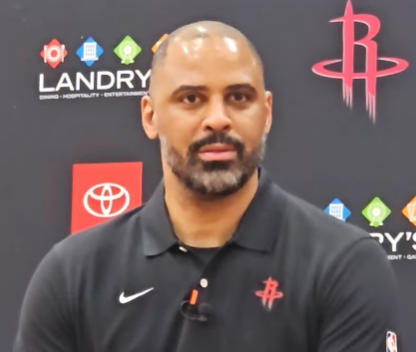
Udoka in 2024

On April 24, 2023, it was reported that the Houston Rockets hired Udoka as their head coach. The hiring became official the next day.

Udoka was named Western Conference Coach of the Month in March 2024 after the Rockets won 13 of their 15 games that month. In his first season with the team, the Rockets finished with a 41–41 record and narrowly missed the playoffs.

==== 2024–25 season ====
Udoka was named Western Conference Coach of the Month in January 2025 after the Rockets won 11 of their 15 games that month. They ultimately finished with a 52–30 record to clinch the Southwest Division for the first time in six years and finished as the #2-seed in the conference for the 2025 playoffs, behind the No. 1 seed Oklahoma City Thunder. However, the Rockets lost to the Warriors in seven games during the first round of the playoffs.

==== 2025–26 season ====
On June 19, 2025, Udoka signed a multi-year contract extension with the Rockets. In the midst of a blockbuster trade where Kevin Durant was acquired by the Rockets, they finished once again with a 52–30 record, this time as the #5-seed in the conference for the 2026 playoffs, where the Los Angeles Lakers were waiting for them. Although Durant remained healthy in the regular season, with his near-total absence in the playoffs, the Rockets lost to the Lakers in six games during the first round.

== National team career ==
Udoka was a player on the Nigerian national team. At the 2006 FIBA World Championships, he led Nigeria in scoring, assists, and steals. Udoka also played for Nigeria in the 2005 and 2011 FIBA Africa Championships, winning a bronze medal in both tournaments.

Udoka has served as an assistant coach for USA Basketball under his Spurs head coach, Gregg Popovich. Udoka's coaching role on the 2019 FIBA World Cup team helped him build relationships with Celtics players Jayson Tatum, Jaylen Brown, and Marcus Smart, who advocated for his hiring as the new Celtics head coach. Udoka also coached for Team USA under Popovich at the 2020 Summer Olympics in Tokyo, along with Celtics assistant Will Hardy.

== Personal life ==
Udoka's father, Vitalis, was of Nigerian descent, which qualified Udoka for Nigerian citizenship. His older sister, Mfon, played in the WNBA. Udoka's mother, Agnes, who died in late 2011, was an American from Illinois.

In February 2010, Udoka met actress Nia Long and they later began a relationship. On November 7, 2011, Long gave birth to their first child, a son named Kez Sunday. Udoka and Long got engaged in May 2015, but they split in December 2022, a few months after Udoka's affair with a female Celtics staff member came to light.

== NBA career statistics ==
Legend
GP	Games played	GS	Games started	MPG	Minutes per game
FG%	Field goal percentage	3P%	3-point field goal percentage	FT%	Free throw percentage
RPG	Rebounds per game	APG	Assists per game	SPG	Steals per game
BPG	Blocks per game	PPG	Points per game	**Bold**	Career high

=== Regular season ===
Year	Team	GP	GS	MPG	FG%	3P%	FT%	RPG	APG	SPG	BPG	PPG
2003–04	L.A. Lakers	4	0	7.0	.333	.000	.500	1.3	.5	.5	**.2**	2.0
2005–06	New York	8	0	14.3	.375	.333	.500	2.1	.8	.1	.0	2.8
2006–07	Portland	**75**	**75**	**28.6**	**.461**	**.406**	.742	**3.7**	**1.5**	**.9**	**.2**	**8.4**
2007–08	San Antonio	73	0	18.0	.424	.370	**.759**	3.1	.9	.8	**.2**	5.8
2008–09	San Antonio	67	3	15.4	.383	.328	.609	2.8	.8	.5	**.2**	4.3
2009–10	Sacramento	69	2	13.7	.378	.286	.737	2.8	.8	.5	.1	3.6
2010–11	San Antonio	20	0	6.5	.238	.000	.500	.9	.7	.4	.0	.7
Career		316	80	18.1	.417	.356	.705	2.9	1.0	.7	.2	5.2

=== Playoffs ===
Year	Team	GP	GS	MPG	FG%	3P%	FT%	RPG	APG	SPG	BPG	PPG
2008	San Antonio	**16**	0	14.8	**.465**	**.400**	**.714**	2.9	**1.1**	.7	.1	**5.4**
2009	San Antonio	5	0	**20.8**	.350	.125	.400	**4.6**	.8	**.8**	**.2**	3.4
Career		21	0	16.2	.440	.354	.583	3.3	1.0	.7	.1	5.0

== Head coaching record ==
Legend
Regular season	G	Games coached	W	Games won	L	Games lost	W–L %	Win–loss %
Playoffs	PG	Playoff games	PW	Playoff wins	PL	Playoff losses	PW–L %	Playoff win–loss %

Team	Year	G	W	L	W–L%	Finish	PG	PW	PL	PW–L%	Result
Boston	2021–22	82	51	31	.622	1st in Atlantic	24	14	10	.583	Lost in NBA Finals
Houston	2023–24	82	41	41	.500	3rd in Southwest	—	—	—	—	Missed playoffs
Houston	2024–25	82	52	30	.634	1st in Southwest	7	3	4	.429	Lost in first round
Houston	2025–26	82	52	30	.634	2nd in Southwest	6	2	4	.333	Lost in first round
Career		328	196	132	.598		37	19	18	.514	

== See also ==
- List of people banned or suspended by the NBA
