= Richard Moguena =

Chadian basketball player

AS Africana
- Position: Small forward
- League: D1 Chad

Personal information
- Born: 1 September 1986 (age 40) N'Djamena, Chad
- Listed height: 6 ft 7 in (2.01 m)

Career history
- 2010: AS Africana

Richard Moguena, born 1 September 1986, is a Chadian professional basketball player. He currently plays for the AS Africana of the D1 Chad.

He represented Chad's national basketball team at the 2011 FIBA Africa Championship in Antananarivo, Madagascar, where he was his team's best rebounder and free throw shooter.
