= Chad men's national basketball team =

Chad
- FIBA ranking: 122 (3 March 2026)
- Joined FIBA: 1963
- FIBA zone: FIBA Africa
- National federation: Fédération Tchadienne de Basketball
- Coach: Patrick Maucouvert

Olympic Games
- Appearances: None

FIBA World Cup
- Appearances: None

FIBA Africa Championship
- Appearances: 1 (2011)
- Medals: None
Home	Away

Chadian men's national basketball team competes for the country Chad in international competition, governed by the Fédération Tchadienne de Basketball. The team is in zone 4 of FIBA Africa.

Its main accomplishment was the qualification for the 2011 FIBA Africa Championship. There, Chad lost to the 2015 Champion Nigeria in the first round of the Knockout stage (also called Round of 16). Abderamane Mbaindiguim led the team in points per game with an average of 9.2.

== Competitions ==
=== Summer Olympics ===
yet to qualify

=== FIBA Basketball World Cup ===
FIBA World Cup record						Qualification record		
Year	Round	Position	GP	W	L	GP	W	L
(Brazil) 1963	Did not qualify					AfroBasket served as qualification		
(Uruguay) 1967	Did not qualify					AfroBasket served as qualification		
(Socialist Federal Republic of Yugoslavia) 1970	Did not qualify					AfroBasket served as qualification		
(Puerto Rico) 1974	Did not qualify					AfroBasket served as qualification		
(Philippines) 1978	Did not qualify					AfroBasket served as qualification		
(Colombia) 1982	Did not qualify					AfroBasket served as qualification		
(Spain) 1986	Did not qualify					AfroBasket served as qualification		
(Argentina) 1990	Did not qualify					AfroBasket served as qualification		
(Canada) 1994	Did not qualify					AfroBasket served as qualification		
(Greece) 1998	Did not qualify					AfroBasket served as qualification		
(United States) 2002	Did not qualify					AfroBasket served as qualification		
(Japan) 2006	Did not qualify					AfroBasket served as qualification		
(Turkey) 2010	Did not qualify					AfroBasket served as qualification		
(Spain) 2014	Did not qualify					AfroBasket served as qualification		
(China) 2019	Did not qualify					12	3	9
(Philippines) (Japan) (Indonesia) 2023	Did not qualify					Did not enter		
(Qatar) 2027	Did not enter					Did not enter		
(France) 2031	To be determined					To be determined		
Total	0/17					12	3	9

=== AfroBasket ===
AfroBasket record						Qualification record		
Year	Round	Position	GP	W	L	GP	W	L
(Morocco) 1964	Did not qualify							
(Tunisia) 1965	Did not qualify							
(Morocco) 1968	Did not qualify							
(Egypt) 1970	Did not qualify							
(Senegal) 1972	Did not qualify							
(Central African Republic) 1974	Did not qualify							
(Egypt) 1975	Did not qualify							
(Senegal) 1978	Did not qualify							
(Morocco) 1980	Did not qualify							
(Somalia) 1981	Did not qualify							
(Egypt) 1983	Did not qualify							
(Ivory Coast) 1985	Did not qualify							
(Tunisia) 1987	Did not qualify							
(Angola) 1989	Did not qualify							
(Egypt) 1992	Did not qualify							
(Kenya) 1993	Did not qualify							
(Algeria) 1995	Did not qualify							
(Senegal) 1997	Did not qualify							
(Angola) 1999	Did not qualify							
(Morocco) 2001	Did not qualify							
(Egypt) 2003	Did not qualify							
(Algeria) 2005	Did not qualify							
(Angola) 2007	Did not qualify							
(Libya) 2009	Did not qualify					Did not enter		
(Madagascar) 2011	Round of 16	15th	4	0	4	2	0	2
(Ivory Coast) 2013	Did not qualify					Did not enter		
(Tunisia) 2015	Did not qualify					4	1	3
(Tunisia) (Senegal) 2017	Did not qualify					4	2	2
(Rwanda) 2021	Did not qualify					4	2	2
(Angola) 2025	Did not qualify					Did not enter		
Total	1/		4	0	4	14	5	9

=== AfroCan ===
FIBA AfroCan record						Qualification record			
Year	Round	Position	GP	W	L	GP	W	L	–
(Mali) 2019	Quarter-finals	5th	6	2	4	Not held			
(Angola) 2023	Did not qualify					4	1	3	2023
(Rwanda) 2027	To be determined					To be determined			
Total	1/3		6	2	4	4	1	3	–

=== Islamic Solidarity Games ===
- 2005 : 9th
- 2013 : Did not participate
- 2017 : To be determined

== Current roster ==
Team for the 2015 Afrobasket Qualification:

Chad men's national basketball team roster
Players
Coaches

Pos.	No.	Name	Age – Date of birth	Height	Club
		Lebtoloum Ahidjo	29 – 12 July 1986			(Chad)
		Vincent Alhoki Atossom	30 – 14 April 1985
		Klamong Adoum Alladoum	30 – 22 July 1985			(Cameroon)
		Bienvenu Djimassal	22 – 10 September 1992	2.00 m (6 ft 7 in)		(Chad)
		Antoine Mboybe Jairus	21 – 12 February 1994
		Kouma Wada Pame	19 – 20 August 1995			(Chad)
		Edmond Koyanouba	20 – 10 January 1995
		Soussia Lassou	34 – 10 January 1981			(Chad)
		Garba Makka	26 – 24 December 1988	2.01 m (6 ft 7 in)		(Chad)
		Francis Mamadjibeye	25 – 5 June 1990			(Chad)
SF		Richard Moguena	28 – 1 September 1986	2.00 m (6 ft 7 in)		(Chad)
		Placide Nakidjim	21 – 25 May 1994
		Issa Nakoye	24 – 18 December 1990
		Ronald Nato Kolmia	22 – 20 November 1992	1.99 m (6 ft 6 in)
		Olivier Ndilngar	25 – 10 August 1990			(Chad)
		Mario Ngadi	29 – 5 June 1986	2.00 m (6 ft 7 in)		(Chad)
		Djimtoïde Ngarasde	27 – 5 September 1987
		Prosper Ngardinguim	21 – 2 January 1994
		Asnal Noubaramadji	30 – 3 April 1985	1.83 m (6 ft 0 in)		(Chad)
		Sale Ousmane	34 – 19 October 1980	2.05 m (6 ft 9 in)		(Chad)

Head coach

- (France) Patrick Maucouvert

Legend

- Club – describes last
  club before the tournament
- Age – describes age
  on 19 August 2015

Other notable players from Chad:

Chad men's national basketball team roster
Players	Coaches
Pos. / No. / Name / Age – Date of birth / Height / Club; F / / Jacques Alingue / 27 – 30 April 1988 / 2.01 m (6 ft 7 in) / JDA Dijon Bourgogne / (France)	Legend: Club – describes current or most recent club; Age – describes age on 30 August 2015

== Head coach position ==
- (France) Patrick Maucouvert – 2011

== Past Rosters ==
2011 FIBA Africa Championship Roster Head coach: Patrick Maucouvert

#	Pos	Name	Club	Date of Birth	Height
4	PG	Asnal Noubaramadji	(Chad) AS Archibeau	April 3, 1985 (age 41)	1.83 m (6 ft 0 in)
5	PG	Dillah Mbairessem	(Chad) AS Africana	November 1, 1980 (age 45)	1.93 m (6 ft 4 in)
6	SF	Koïbé Mickael	(Chad) AS Archibeau	December 18, 1992 (age 33)	1.98 m (6 ft 6 in)
7	F	Abderamane Mbaindiguim	(Algeria) CSM Constantine	March 1, 1982 (age 44)	1.95 m (6 ft 5 in)
8	F	Djimtoïde Mgarasde	(Chad) AS Archibeau	September 5, 1987 (age 38)	1.99 m (6 ft 6 1/2 in)
9	PF	Mario Ngadi	(Chad) AS Africana	June 5, 1986 (age 39)	2.00 m (6 ft 6 1/2 in)
10	F	Richard Moguena	(Chad) AS Africana	September 1, 1986 (age 39)	2.00 m (6 ft 6 1/2 in)
11	F	Ronald Nato Kolmia	(Chad) AS Constructor	November 20, 1992 (age 33)	1.99 m (6 ft 6 1/2 in)
12	SF	Garba Makka	(United States) Virginia Union University	December 24, 1988 (age 37)	2.01 m (6 ft 7 in)
13	C	Sale Ousmane	(Ivory Coast) Abidjan BC	October 19, 1980 (age 45)	2.05 m (6 ft 8 1/2 in)
14	C	Bienvenu Djimassal	(Chad) AS Africana	September 10, 1993 (age 32)	2.00 m (6 ft 6 1/2 in)
15	F	Théodore Mbaïarsi	(Ivory Coast) Abidjan BC	November 5, 1976 (age 49)	1.93 m (6 ft 4 in)
