= Tarek El-Sabbagh =

Egyptian basketball player

Personal information
- Nationality: Egyptian
- Born: 6 September 1957 (age 67)

Sport
- Sport: Basketball

Tarek El-Sabbagh (born 6 September 1957) is an Egyptian basketball player. He competed in the men's tournament at the 1984 Summer Olympics.
