= Mamadou Diarra (basketball) =

Malian basketball player (born 1986)

Personal information
- Born: August 29, 1986 (age 40) Bamako, Mali
- Listed height: 7 ft 0 in (2.13 m)

Career information
- NBA draft: 2011: undrafted
- Playing career: 2011–2015
- Position: Center

Mamadou Diarra (born August 29, 1986) is a Malian retired basketball player. Standing at 7 ft 0 in (2.13 m), he plays at the center position.

== Profile ==
Mamadou Diarra is a talented player with great athletic skills. Possessing a 7'6" wingspan and the size to make him a force in the middle, he also has a good shot from 4–5 meters, can run the floor, and has a variety of low-post moves.

== College and professional career ==
In 2006, Diarra moved to the United States, where he enrolled at Stoneridge Preparatory School in Simi Valley, California. Later, he played college basketball for the USC and the Chaminade University of Honolulu.

After not being selected at the 2011 NBA draft, he moved to Spain to play for Oviedo CB. He has also played for Malabo Kings of the D-1 league of Equatorial Guinea.

== International career ==
Diarra has competed for Mali through multiple junior national teams, and participated at the AfroBasket 2011.
