= Ezenwa Ukeagu =

American basketball player

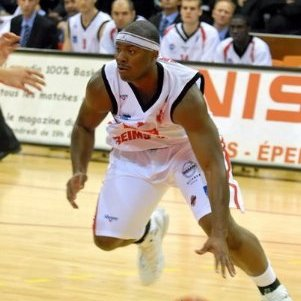

Personal information
- Born: February 22, 1981 (age 45) Los Angeles, California, U.S.
- Listed height: 6 ft 8 in (2.03 m)
- Listed weight: 253 lb (115 kg)

Career information
- High school: Coral Springs (Coral Springs, Florida)
- College: Binghamton University Palm Beach Community College Washington State University
- NBA draft: 2004: undrafted
- Playing career: 2004–2014
- Position: Power forward / center

Career highlights
- Nigerian National Team (2011); African Championships in Madagascar (2011) (Bronze medalist); Luxembourg Cup Finalist (2012); Luxembourg League Regular Season Runner-Up (2012); Luxembourg League Champion (2012)

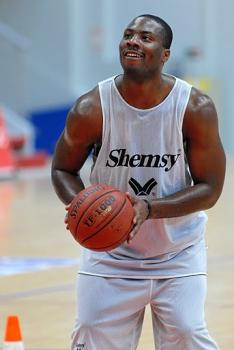

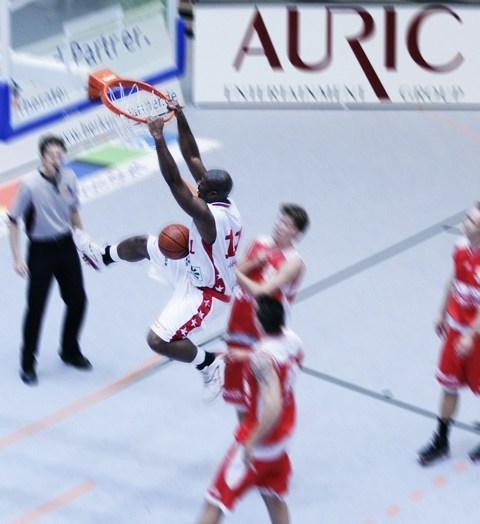

Ezenwa Ukeagu (born February 22, 1981) is a Nigerian-American former professional basketball player born in Los Angeles, California. He played for the Washington State University Cougars. He is 6'8 and 253lbs. He was on the Nigerian National Basketball Team in 2011.

== Early years ==
Ukeagu played center for Coral Springs High where he notably scored 17 points and pulled down nine rebounds per game as a senior high student.

Ukeagu was named to all-tournament team at prestigious Kreul Christmas Classic...preseason honorable All-American by Street & Smith's...selected to All-Broward County team. He is also a two-time letter winner in basketball.

== College Years ==
Ukeagu played at the State University of New York, Binghamton as a freshman. He started 23 games for Binghamton University, which averaged 8.2 points and a team-leading 6.9 rebounds. He shot 52 percent from the field and recorded a team-high 27 blocks.

He spent his sophomore season at Palm Beach Community College, wherein he averaged 13 points and 11 rebounds per game at the Palm Beach Community College. He earned all-conference honors and got selected for Florida's North-South Junior College All-Star game. At the same time, he was being recruited by Washington State University, St. Bonaventure University, University of Miami, Quinnipiac University, Cleveland State University, and Winthrop University. Eventually, he decided to attend Washington State University.

Ukeagu spent his junior season at Washington State University where he earned his first career start at No. 2 Arizona. On Jan. 9, he scored in double figures four times, where he collected 10 rebounds twice, against No. 2 Arizona. During the season, he accomplished some noteworthy feats. He registered two steals against the Wildcats on Feb. 8 and a week later at No. 24 Stanford. He was third among the Cougars in offensive rebounds (39), defensive rebounds (58), total rebounds (97), and free throw attempts (54). He was second on the team in free throws made (40). However, he had to miss four games in the middle of the season due to an emergency appendectomy. Nevertheless, he ended the season on a high note by scoring a season-high 15 points, including shooting 7-for-8 from the free throw line, at USC. On March 8, he grabbed eight rebounds and added two assists against the Trojans.

He played his senior season at Washington State University, making four starts and scoring in double figures four times. He helped the Cougars clinch a spot in the Pacific Life Pac-10 Tournament with 11 points and five rebounds in the home finale against California. At UCLA and USC, he averaged six points and three rebounds off the bench as WSU swept the Los Angeles road trip for the first time in school history. He was second on the team with 44 offensive rebounds and third with 93 total caroms.

== Professional Years ==
*2004–2005: ART Duesseldorf Magics (Germany)

*2005–2006: ART Duesseldorf Magics (Germany)

*2006–2007: ART Duesseldorf Magics (Germany)

*2007–2008: Reims Champagne Basket (France)

*2008–2009: MGS Grand-Saconnex Basket (Switzerland)

*2009–2010: Saint Vallier Basket Drome (France)

*2010: BG Karlsruhe (Germany)

*2011: ADA Blois Basket (France)

*2011: Wamsler SE Salgotarjan (Hungary)

*2011–2012: BBC Sparta Bertrange (Luxembourg)

*2012: Basket Globalcaja Quintanar (Spain)

*2013: CA Bizertin (Tunisia)

*2013–2014: Tacapes De Gabes (Tunisia)

*2014: Mineros De Caborca (Mexico)

== National team ==
In 2011, Ukeagu was a member of the senior Nigerian national basketball team. The team finished the Africa Championship with a bronze medal and was the highest place the Nigerian national basketball team received at the time.
