= Alfred Aboya =

Cameroonian basketball player (born 1985)

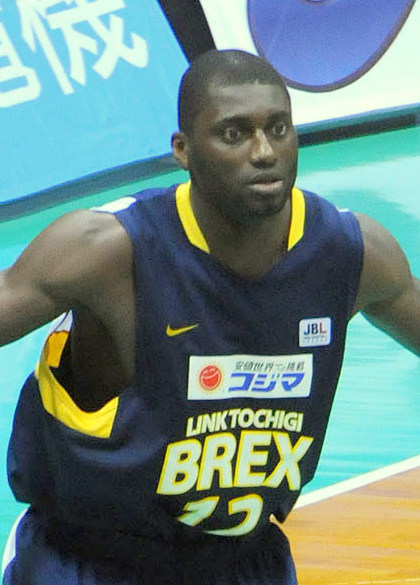
- Aboya with Link Tochigi Brex in Japan in 2010

NBA Academy Africa
- League: Road to BAL

Personal information
- Born: 2 January 1985 (age 41) Yaoundé, Cameroon
- Listed height: 6 ft 9 in (2.06 m)
- Listed weight: 231 lb (105 kg)

Career information
- High school: Tilton School (Tilton, New Hampshire)
- College: UCLA (2005–2009)
- NBA draft: 2009: undrafted
- Playing career: 2009–2015
- Position: Power forward / center

Career history

Playing
- 2009–2010: Olympique Antibes
- 2010: Link Tochigi Brex
- 2010–2011: Hitachi Sunrockers
- 2012: Bucaneros de La Guaira
- 2012: Final Gençlik
- 2012–2013: Shiga Lakestars
- 2013: Final Gençlik
- 2013–2014: Fort Wayne Mad Ants
- 2014: Reno Bighorns
- 2014: Al-Ittihad Tripoli
- 2014: Reno Bighorns
- 2014–2015: Los Angeles D-Fenders

Coaching
- 2019–2021: Iowa Wolves (assistant)
- 2022–present: NBA Academy Africa

Career highlights
- JBL champion (2010); Pac-10 All-Defensive Team (2009)

Alfred Aboya Baliaba (born 2 January 1985) is a Cameroonian former professional basketball player and current coach. He played college basketball for the UCLA Bruins, advancing to three Final Fours. He was a member of the winningest class in UCLA history with 123 wins.

Aboya grew up and attended high school in Cameroon before attending prep school in the United States. He attended college at the University of California, Los Angeles (UCLA), where he earned his undergraduate degree in three years while playing four seasons for the Bruins. Aboya began his professional career in France, and later played in Japan, Venezuela, Turkey, and Libya. He also played in the United States in the NBA Development League (now known as the G League).

== Early life ==
Aboya was born in Yaoundé, Cameroon, to his mother, Kedi Kofane Angele, and his father, Baliaba Aboya Casimir.

He graduated from high school in Cameroon and then attended prep school at Tilton School in Tilton, New Hampshire. He was recruited by Tilton coach Scott Willard, who had only seen a picture of Aboya soaring for a slam dunk. The school was looking to grow its international student population, and it was developing an English as a Second Language program. Tilton had never had any students from Africa, and while Aboya spoke a couple of languages, none of them were English. He was a star in two sports including basketball. Though he had already graduated from high school, Aboya was willing to sacrifice two years at Tilton as a path toward an American university education.

He was a raw player when he began at Tilton. He became a dominant center by his senior year, and he drew attention from colleges like Georgetown and UCLA. On a visit to the West Coast, Aboya became friends with Luc Richard Mbah a Moute, who grew up near him in Yaoundé.

== College career ==
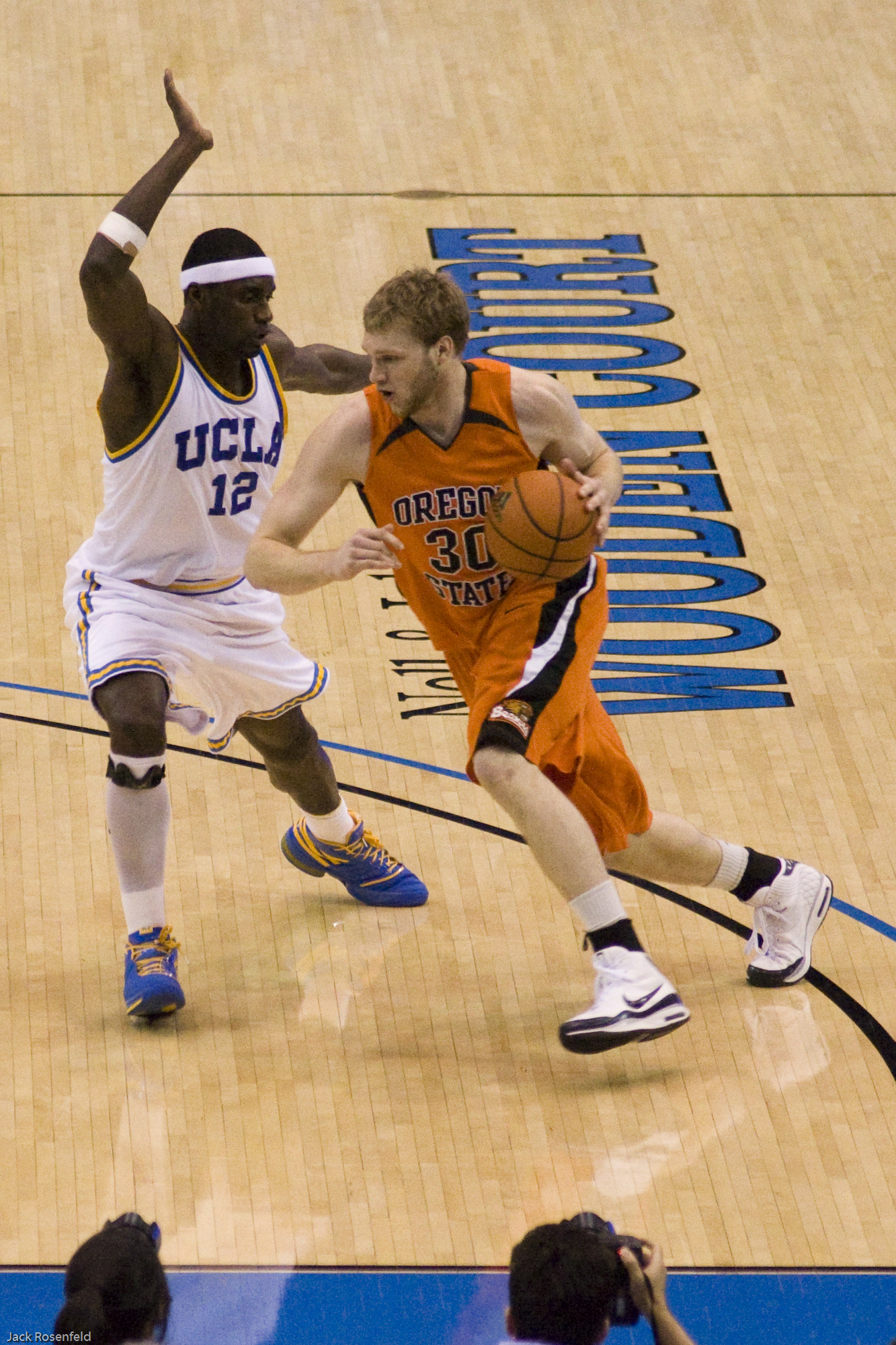
Aboya on defense against Oregon State's Daniel Deane in 2009

Joined by Mbah a Moute, Aboya began attending UCLA in the fall of 2005. The two teammates relied on each other for support. UCLA advanced to the Final Four in each of Aboya's first three seasons. In his first year, he was originally set to be a starter until he had arthroscopic surgery on both knees, delaying his debut until the seventh game of the season. He played 33 games, starting two, in 2005–06. In his second year, he played in 35 of the Bruins' 36 games, including one start. That season, he had almost as many offensive rebounds (68) as he did defensive rebounds (79). As a junior in 2006–07, Aboya was one of four teammates to play in all 39 games. He made 17 starts, playing 15.2 minutes per game while averaging 2.9 points and 2.2 rebounds.

In his senior year in 2008–09, UCLA relied on him as a rebounder after Mbah a Moute and Kevin Love had left for the National Basketball Association (NBA). Aboya averaged 9.9 points and 6.3 rebounds a game, both personal bests. He drew praise for his defense, and also developed a 12-foot (3.7 m) jump shot. Aboya and fellow senior teammates Darren Collison and Josh Shipp finished their careers as the winningest class in UCLA history with 123 wins. The distinction was relative, as John Wooden's legendary teams played shorter seasons and freshmen were ineligible.

Academically, Aboya felt he had fallen behind during his two years in prep school. He worked with his academic adviser to earn his undergraduate degree in three years, graduating with a grade point average over 3.0 in international relations. In his fourth year, he began work on his master's degree in public policy. He aspired to one day become the president of Cameroon.

== Professional career ==
After going undrafted in the 2009 NBA draft, he joined the Dallas Mavericks for the 2009 NBA Summer League. In September 2009, he signed with BCM Gravelines. However, he was released a week later.

In October 2009, he signed with Olympique Antibes of the LNB Pro B, before joining Link Tochigi Brex of the Japan Basketball League (JBL) in January 2010.

In the summer of 2010, he signed with the Hitachi Sunrockers of the JBL for the 2010–11 season.

He signed with Bucaneros de La Guaira of Liga Profesional de Baloncesto for the 2012 season, but he left in February 2012 and in March moved to Final Gençlik of the Turkish Basketball Second League.

He played the 2012–13 season with Shiga Lakestars of Japan before being released in early 2013.

In March 2013, he moved back to Final Gençlik.

On 1 November 2013, he was selected by the Fort Wayne Mad Ants in the second round of the 2013 NBA D-League draft. On 22 November, he was waived by the Mad Ants. On 20 December 2013, he was reacquired by the Mad Ants. On 4 February 2014, he was again waived by the Mad Ants. On 20 March 2014, he was acquired by the Reno Bighorns. On 28 March 2014, he was released by the Bighorns after appearing in two games for them. The next month, he joined Al Ittihad Tripoli of Libya.

On 2 November 2014, he was reacquired by the Reno Bighorns. On 12 December 2014, he was waived by the Bighorns after appearing in seven games. Six days later, he was acquired by the Los Angeles D-Fenders. On 28 January 2015, Aboya was waived by the D-Fenders, only to be reacquired less than a month later on 25 February.

== Coaching career ==
On 30 October 2019, Aboya was hired as an assistant and player development coach by the Iowa Wolves of the NBA G League.

In 2021, Alfred Roland Aboya Baliaba was appointed as theAssistant Coach of the Cameroon Men's National Team during the FIBA 2021 Afrobasket, where the team lost all three group games. Subsequently, he was promoted to the position of Head Coach. Under his leadership, the team participated in the 2023 FIBA African World Cup Qualifiers, achieving a record of 4 wins and 8 losses, placing third in Group B and failing to qualify for the next stage.

In 2022, Aboya became a coach for the NBA Academy Africa program, located in Senegal. In November, he was the head coach of the academy's team in the 2023 BAL qualification games.

During the FIBA 2023 AfroCAN competition, Aboya did not serve as the coach, and the team finished 11th overall. However, he resumed his role as Head Coach in August 2023 during the FIBA Pre-Olympic Qualifying Tournament held in Nigeria. During this tournament, Cameroon's team, under Aboya's leadership, went undefeated, securing qualification for the qualifiers for the second time in their history.
