= Guy Edi =

Ivorian-French basketball player

No. 8 – Calgary Surge
- Position: Small forward
- League: CEBL

Personal information
- Born: December 26, 1988 (age 37) Agboville, Ivory Coast
- Listed height: 6 ft 6 in (1.98 m)
- Listed weight: 218 lb (99 kg)

Career information
- High school: Sylmar (Sylmar, California); Stoneridge Prep (Simi Valley, California)
- College: Midland (2009–2011); Gonzaga (2011–2013)
- NBA draft: 2013: undrafted
- Playing career: 2006–present

Career history
- 2006–2008: Paris-Levallois
- 2013–2015: Champagne Châlons-Reims
- 2015–2016: STB Le Havre
- 2016–2017: Saint-Chamond
- 2017–2018: Nantes
- 2018: Kataja BC
- 2018–2019: Champagne Châlons-Reims
- 2019–2020: UTBM Tours
- 2021: Þór Akureyri
- 2021–2023: Basketball Löwen Erfurt
- 2023–present: Calgary Surge

Ohouo Guy Landry Edi (born December 26, 1988) is an Ivorian-French basketball player for the Calgary Surge of the Canadian Elite Basketball League (CEBL) and a member of the Côte d'Ivoire national basketball team.

== Early life ==
Born in Agboville, Ivory Coast and raised in Paris, France, Edi later moved to the United States and joined the basketball team of Sylmar High School in Sylmar, California as a sophomore in February 2007. Edi transferred to Van Nuys High School the following fall but was not granted eligibility by his school district. Edi attended Stoneridge Preparatory School as a senior.

== College career ==
While originally looking at the University of Miami at Florida, he instead went to Midland College of the NJCAA and then transferred to Gonzaga University and played for the Bulldogs.

From 2006 to 2008, Edi played some games for Paris-Levallois Basket of LNB Pro A. Because of his playing time there, Edi served an eight-game suspension for an exhibition game and first eight regular season games of the 2011–12 season with Gonzaga for violating NCAA rules on amateurism. Edi made his first career start on January 21, 2012 against San Diego, with eight points and four rebounds in 26 minutes. As a junior, Edi averaged 5.5 points and 2.4 rebounds.

As a senior in 2012–13, Edi started the first 11 games but played fewer minutes in the second half of the season. He ended the season averaging only 3.0 points and 2.1 rebounds.

== Professional career ==
From 2013 to 2015, Edi played for Champagne Châlons-Reims, then with STB Le Havre from 2015 to 2016. In January 2017 he signed with Saint-Chamond.

In January 2021, Edi signed with Úrvalsdeild karla club Þór Akureyri. In 19 games, he averaged 11.3 points and 7.1 rebounds per game. Edi agreed to terms with German third-division side Basketball Löwen Erfurt in July 2021.

== International competition ==
Edi is also a member of the Ivory Coast national basketball team and played for the team for the first time at the 2010 FIBA World Championship in Turkey. In 2021, he won a silver medal at the FIBA AfroBasket 2021. Edi averaged 8.2 points and 6.7 rebounds a contest during the tournament.
