= Mickaël Toti =

French basketball player

Mickaël Toti (born 11 April 1987 in Ivry-sur-Seine, France) is a French basketball player who played for French Pro A league clubs Reims, Clermont and Rouen from 2003 to 2009.
