= Jonathan Kale =

American-born Ivorian basketball player

Personal information
- Born: October 18, 1985 (age 41) Mattapan, Massachusetts U.S.
- Listed height: 6 ft 8 in (2.03 m)
- Listed weight: 240 lb (110 kg)

Career information
- High school: St. Andrew's School (Barrington, Rhode Island)
- College: Providence (2005–2009)
- NBA draft: 2009: undrafted
- Playing career: 2009–2015
- Position: Center

Career history
- 2009: Anwil Włocławek
- 2009–2010: Phoenix Hagen
- 2010–2011: Ourense Termal
- 2011–2012: Lleida Bàsquet
- 2012–2013: CB Coruña
- 2013–2014: Ourense Termal
- 2014–2015: Lille Metropole
Medals
Representing Ivory Coast
Men's basketball
Afrobasket
Silver medal – second place	2009 Libya	National Team

Jonathan Kale (born October 18, 1985) is a retired American-born Ivorian professional basketball player. Kale was a four-year player for Providence College and started every game in his senior season, averaging a career best 10.1 PPG and 6.0 RPG. He finished in the top 15 on the Providence career list in offensive rebounds and field goal percentage.

Kale was a member of the Côte d'Ivoire national basketball team at the 2009 FIBA Africa Championship. At the tournament, he helped the team to a surprise silver medal to qualify for the country's first FIBA World Championship in 24 years by averaging 5.6 PPG and 3.6 RPG.

Following his performance at the 2009 FIBA Africa Championship, Kale signed his first professional contract with Anwil Włocławek of the Polish League on August 28, 2009.

In July 2014, Kale signed with Lille Metropole in France.
