= Ibrahim El-Gammal =

Egyptian basketball player

Ibrahim El Gammal
No. 9 – Al Ahly
- Position: Shooting guard
- League: Egyptian Basketball Super League

Personal information
- Born: 23 February 1988 (age 38) Kafr El Sheikh, Egypt
- Listed height: 1.89 m (6 ft 2 in)

Career information
- NBA draft: 2010: undrafted
- Playing career: 2006–present

Career history
- 2006–2022: Al Ahly

Ibrahim El-Gammal (born 23 March 1988) is an Egyptian basketball player for Al Ahly and the Egyptian national team, where he participated at the 2014 FIBA Basketball World Cup.

== Honours ==
=== National team ===
AfroBasket

- Runners-up:2013 Ivory Coast

== Clubs ==
- (Egypt) Al Ahly

Egyptian Basketball Super League

- (gold) Winner: 2 : 2011–12, 2015-16

Egypt Basketball Cup

- (gold) Winner: (4) : 2006–07, 2008–09, 2010–11, 2017–18

Egyptian Mortabat League

- Winners (3) :2006/07, 2016/17, 2017-18

FIBA Africa Clubs Champions Cup

- Winner: (1) 2016 FIBA Africa Clubs Champions Cup
- third : 2012 FIBA Africa Clubs Champions Cup
