= 2016 FIBA Africa Under-18 Championship squads =

This article displays the rosters for the participating teams at the 2016 FIBA Africa Under-18 Championship.

== Algeria ==
Algeria men's national U18 basketball team – 2016 FIBA Africa Championship – 7th place roster
Players
Coaches

Pos.	No.	Name	Age – Date of birth	Height	Club	Ctr.
PG	4	Ibrahim Haichour	17 – 22 March 1998	1.90 m (6 ft 3 in)	USM Sétif	(Algeria)
PF	5	Islam-Nizar Taleb	17 – 4 March 1998	2.01 m (6 ft 7 in)
G	6	Zakaria Aggoun	17 – 1 May 1998	1.80 m (5 ft 11 in)	NB Staoueli	(Algeria)
PG	7	Mohamed Boussad	16 – 26 November 1998	1.80 m (5 ft 11 in)	NB Staoueli	(Algeria)
F	8	Anis Bouadjadja	17 – 30 April 1998	1.94 m (6 ft 4 in)	USM Sétif	(Algeria)
PF	9	Louai Chebel	17 – 29 January 1998	1.97 m (6 ft 6 in)	RCEE	(Algeria)
G	10	Mohamed Sahbi	16 – 14 January 1999	1.86 m (6 ft 1 in)	ASSOB	(Algeria)
F	11	Youcef Boudoumi	17 – 3 March 1998	1.92 m (6 ft 4 in)	NB Staoueli	(Algeria)
G	12	Mostefa Braik	16 – 7 April 1999	1.82 m (6 ft 0 in)	CSMOD	(Algeria)
PF	13	Abdelkrim Debbi	16 – 31 August 1998	1.98 m (6 ft 6 in)	USM Alger	(Algeria)
C	14	Rayan Hamdi	16 – 9 July 1999	2.04 m (6 ft 8 in)	Paris-Levalloi	(France)
C	15	Abderrahmane Hailouf	17 – 5 April 1998	2.06 m (6 ft 9 in)	CSMOD	(Algeria)

Head coach

- (Algeria) Mohamed Abidat

Assistant coach(es)

- (Algeria) Ferdjellah Harrouni

Legend

- (C) Team captain
- Club field describes current club

== Angola ==
Angola national U18 basketball team – 2016 FIBA Africa Championship – Gold Medal roster
Players
Coaches

Pos.	No.	Name	Age – Date of birth	Height	Club
G	4	Childe Dundão	18 – 17 May 1998	1.67 m (5 ft 6 in)	Petro de Luanda	(Angola)
G	5	Ismael Monteiro	18 – 17 July 1998	1.67 m (5 ft 6 in)	Petro de Luanda	(Angola)
C	6	Sílvio Sousa	17 – 7 October 1998	2.03 m (6 ft 8 in)	Montverde Academy	(United States)
F	7	Cley Cabanga	18 – 9 July 1998	1.87 m (6 ft 2 in)	Petro de Luanda	(Angola)
PG	8	Geraldo Santos	18 – 1 May 1998	1.87 m (6 ft 2 in)	Vila Clotilde	(Angola)
F	9	Glofate Buiamba	17 – 5 January 1999	1.97 m (6 ft 6 in)	ASA	(Angola)
PF	10	Cristiano Gomes	18 – 14 April 1998	2.03 m (6 ft 8 in)	Portland Academy	(United States)
C	11	Jonatão Ndjungu	18 – 17 June 1998	2.03 m (6 ft 8 in)	Interclube	(Angola)
F	12	Mílton Valente	17 – 28 September 1998	1.95 m (6 ft 5 in)	Primeiro de Agosto	(Angola)
C	13	Bruno Fernandes	17 – 15 August 1998	2.07 m (6 ft 9 in)	Montverde Academy	(United States)
PG	14	Tárcio Domingos	18 – 13 June 1998	1.94 m (6 ft 4 in)	Primeiro de Agosto	(Angola)
F	15	Cristiano Xavier	18 – 7 January 1998	1.99 m (6 ft 6 in)	Petro de Luanda	(Angola)

Head coach

- Manuel Silva Gi

Assistant coach(es)

- Miguel Lutonda

Legend

- (C) Team captain
- nat field describes country

== Benin ==
Benin national U18 basketball team – 2016 FIBA Africa Championship – 11th place roster
Players
Coaches

Pos.	No.	Name	Age – Date of birth	Height	Club	Ctr.
PG	4	Romeo Dahassounou	16 – 24 July 1999	1.79 m (5 ft 10 in)
PF	5	Emmanuel Kpanou	16 – 8 September 1998	1.85 m (6 ft 1 in)
G	6	Apollinaire Tchaby	17 – 26 April 1998	1.69 m (5 ft 7 in)
G	7	Jean Ouikoun	16 – 10 July 1999	1.76 m (5 ft 9 in)
G	8	Mariel Adjovi	17 – 22 July 1998	1.77 m (5 ft 10 in)
F	9	Farouk Alidou	17 – 23 January 1998	1.75 m (5 ft 9 in)
G	10	Vinassétan Hounsinou	15 – 9 August 1999	1.80 m (5 ft 11 in)
G	11	Emmanuel Houenouvi	17 – 4 April 1998	1.72 m (5 ft 8 in)
C	12	Pancras Dohou	16 – 12 August 1998	1.90 m (6 ft 3 in)
PF	13	Abdel Toukourou	16 – 9 June 1999	1.83 m (6 ft 0 in)
PG	14	Jerry da Conceição	15 – 26 October 1999	1.79 m (5 ft 10 in)
C	15	Babatounde Epaminondas	17 – 24 May 1998	2.00 m (6 ft 7 in)

Head coach

- (Benin) Aurelius Kouko

Assistant coach(es)

- (Benin) Sourkoua Mondja

Legend

- (C) Team captain
- Club field describes current club

== (Democratic Republic of the Congo) DR Congo ==
DR Congo national U18 basketball team – 2016 FIBA Africa Championship – 6th place roster
Players
Coaches

Pos.	No.	Name	Age – Date of birth	Height	Club	Ctr.
	4	Jerry Kabantu	16 – 25 October 1998
	5	Jospin Basima	17 – 1 June 1998
	6	Philippe Kabenga	17 – 17 June 1998
	7	Jonathan Nzamba	17 – 27 January 1998
	8	Lucien Mulamba	17 – 8 May 1998
	9	Toussaint Nzuiki	17 – 3 July 1998
	10	Messie Makubika	17 – 11 January 1998
	12	Michee Mianga	17 – 26 January 1998
	13	Patrick Kazumba	15 – 11 October 1999
	14	Garmine Kieli	15 – 24 August 1999
	15	Steve Joseph	16 – 16 April 1999

Head coach

- (Democratic Republic of the Congo) Charly Kashala

Assistant coach(es)

- (Democratic Republic of the Congo) Peter Mulolwa

Legend

- (C) Team captain
- Club field describes current club

== Egypt ==
Egypt men's national U18 basketball team – 2016 FIBA Africa Championship – Silver Medal roster
Players
Coaches

Pos.	No.	Name	Age – Date of birth	Height	Club	Ctr.
PG	2	Mohamed Ousama Youssef	16 – 27 July 1999	1.86 m (6 ft 1 in)
F	5	Abdelrahman Elgindy	17 – 16 February 1998	2.01 m (6 ft 7 in)
F	6	Mohamed Ramadan	16 – 11 February 1999	1.94 m (6 ft 4 in)
G	7	Omar Youssef	17 – 1 January 1998	1.87 m (6 ft 2 in)
PG	8	Omar Farag	17 – 5 April 1998	1.99 m (6 ft 6 in)
PF	10	Zeyad Elmorsy	16 – 9 December 1998	2.00 m (6 ft 7 in)
C	12	Seifeldin Elsandily	17 – 2 April 1998	2.03 m (6 ft 8 in)
C	14	Ahmed Khalaf	16 – 24 February 1999	2.06 m (6 ft 9 in)
PF	26	Aly Elraei	17 – 11 April 1998	2.01 m (6 ft 7 in)
G	30	Tarek Raafat	16 – 27 June 1999	1.88 m (6 ft 2 in)
C	44	Esam Mostafa	15 – 3 August 1999	1.96 m (6 ft 5 in)

Head coach

- (Egypt) Amr Abouelkhir

Assistant coach(es)

- (Egypt) Tarek Abouzeid
- (Egypt) Tarek Elgendy

Legend

- (C) Team captain
- Club field describes current club

== Gabon ==
Gabon men's national U18 basketball team – 2016 FIBA Africa Championship – 10th place roster
Players
Coaches

Pos.	No.	Name	Age – Date of birth	Height	Club	Ctr.
PG	4	Gleen Akoue	16 – 13 March 1999	1.80 m (5 ft 11 in)	Littoral BC	(Gabon)
PG	5	Gauthier Ekoga	17 – 2 May 1998	1.70 m (5 ft 7 in)	Gloire Divine	(Gabon)
F	6	Yvan Djeni	16 – 28 May 1999	1.98 m (6 ft 6 in)	Tali BB	(Gabon)
F	7	Riph Ntoutoume	17 – 5 May 1998	1.95 m (6 ft 5 in)	Galaxy BB	(Gabon)
PG	8	Jolivet Nguyabama	16 – 17 January 1999	1.75 m (5 ft 9 in)	Asconda BB	(Gabon)
F	9	Yohann Mavoungou	16 – 15 March 1999	1.90 m (6 ft 3 in)	Tali BB	(Gabon)
G	10	Karvelee Nzamba	15 – 28 November 1999	1.89 m (6 ft 2 in)	Espoir BBC	(Gabon)
F	11	Olsen Ayaya	17 – 25 February 1998	1.88 m (6 ft 2 in)	Manga BB	(Gabon)
PF	12	Farrel Dimidimba	17 – 3 May 1998	1.98 m (6 ft 6 in)	Manga BB	(Gabon)
G	13	Kevin Nze Mba	16 – 11 December 1998	1.92 m (6 ft 4 in)	Espoir BBC	(Gabon)
C	14	Adam Yovo	17 – 26 May 1998	2.05 m (6 ft 9 in)	Ezanga Team	(Gabon)
C	15	Hervé Singatady	16 – 7 March 1999	2.06 m (6 ft 9 in)	Elenga Team	(Gabon)

Head coach

- (Gabon) Bertin Kombila

Assistant coach(es)

- (Gabon) Kumb Kumb

Legend

- (C) Team captain
- Club field describes current club

== Ivory Coast ==
Ivory Coast men's national U18 basketball team – 2016 FIBA Africa Championship – 8th place roster
Players
Coaches

Pos.	No.	Name	Age – Date of birth	Height	Club	Ctr.
PG	4	Faman Kone	17 – 6 March 1998	1.82 m (6 ft 0 in)
PG	5	Louis Sie	15 – 31 August 1999	1.71 m (5 ft 7 in)
G	7	Ismael Diarra	16 – 22 April 1999	1.85 m (6 ft 1 in)
PF	8	Aliou Toure	17 – 4 April 1998	1.94 m (6 ft 4 in)
PG	9	Adama Camara	16 – 22 November 1998	1.92 m (6 ft 4 in)
C	10	Franck Djehi	17 – 24 July 1998	2.01 m (6 ft 7 in)
F	11	Bi Gildas Bah	16 – 1 January 1999	1.85 m (6 ft 1 in)
G	13	Isaac Cissé	16 – 19 June 1999	1.83 m (6 ft 0 in)
G	14	Aboubakar Fofana	17 – 28 May 1998	1.84 m (6 ft 0 in)
PF	15	Aisba Gogoua	17 – 21 January 1998	2.02 m (6 ft 8 in)

Head coach

- (Ivory Coast) Gbogou Bouabre

Assistant coach(es)

- (Ivory Coast) Tom Dougah Tape

Legend

- (C) Team captain
- Club field describes current club

== Mali ==
Mali men's national U18 basketball team – 2016 FIBA Africa Championship – Bronze Medal roster
Players
Coaches

Pos.	No.	Name	Age – Date of birth	Height	Club	Ctr.
	4	Badra Samake	16 – 12 December 1998
	5	Ibrahim Camara	16 – 27 September 1998
	6	Ousmane Traore	16 – 18 August 1998
	7	Boubacar Diakite	16 – 30 October 1998
	8	Namakan Traore	17 – 16 April 1998
	9	Lassana Haidara	16 – 13 December 1998	1.97 m (6 ft 6 in)
	10	Ichaka Samake	17 – 14 April 1998
	11	Ibrahim Doumbia	16 – 29 September 1998
	12	Sekou Dembele	16 – 27 September 1998
	13	Mahamadou Diawara	15 – 11 September 1999	2.06 m (6 ft 9 in)
	14	Moulaye Sissoko	15 – 17 November 1999	2.03 m (6 ft 8 in)
	15	Blaise Keita	16 – 29 June 1999	2.10 m (6 ft 11 in)

Head coach

- (Mali) Kaba Kante

Assistant coach(es)

- (Mali) Boubacar Kanoute

Legend

- (C) Team captain
- Club field describes current club

== Rwanda ==
Rwanda men's national U18 basketball team – 2016 FIBA Africa Championship – 5th place roster
Players
Coaches

Pos.	No.	Name	Age – Date of birth	Height	Club	Ctr.
PG	4	Samuel Niyonshuti	16 – 1 July 1999	1.73 m (5 ft 8 in)
PG	5	Jean Mukiza	17 – 26 June 1998	1.82 m (6 ft 0 in)
PF	6	Arnaud Nkusi	16 – 25 June 1999	2.02 m (6 ft 8 in)
PG	7	Gasana Sano	15 – 4 September 1999
SG	8	Chester Kayonga	17 – 12 June 1998	1.94 m (6 ft 4 in)
C	9	Lenox Niyitegeka	16 – 26 May 1999	2.08 m (6 ft 10 in)
SG	10	Emile Kazeneka	14 – 30 August 2000	2.01 m (6 ft 7 in)
SG	11	Patrick Nshizirungu	16 – 2 March 1999	1.94 m (6 ft 4 in)
C	12	Jesse Nkusi	15 – 24 August 1999	2.02 m (6 ft 8 in)
C	13	Osborn Shema	17 – 5 January 1998	2.11 m (6 ft 11 in)
PF	14	Enoch Kisa	16 – 22 January 1999	2.00 m (6 ft 7 in)
PF	15	Cadeau Furaha	17 – 10 June 1998	2.01 m (6 ft 7 in)

Head coach

- (Rwanda) Moise Mutokambali

Assistant coach(es)

- (Rwanda) Jacques Bahige
- (Rwanda) Aime Karim Nkusi

Legend

- (C) Team captain
- Club field describes current club

== Tunisia ==
Tunisia men's national U18 basketball team – 2016 FIBA Africa Championship - 4th place roster
Players
Coaches

Pos.	No.	Name	Age – Date of birth	Height	Club	Ctr.
G	4	Oussama Marnaoui	16 – 16 June 1999	1.93 m (6 ft 4 in)
G	5	Akram Ben Salah	16 – 20 March 1999	1.92 m (6 ft 4 in)
PG	6	Haroun Mansour	17 – 27 January 1998	1.78 m (5 ft 10 in)
G	7	Omar Abid	16 – 24 August 1998	1.88 m (6 ft 2 in)
PG	8	Bilel Jaziri	17 – 25 March 1998	1.92 m (6 ft 4 in)
PF	9	Ahmed Torjemane	16 – 13 February 1999	1.95 m (6 ft 5 in)
C	10	Mohamed Rassil	17 – 3 February 1998	2.00 m (6 ft 7 in)
C	12	Mohamed Selmi	17 – 31 March 1998	2.05 m (6 ft 9 in)
F	13	Ismail Chrigui	17 – 28 July 1998	1.97 m (6 ft 6 in)
PG	14	Mohamed Mesbah	17 – 11 May 1998	1.78 m (5 ft 10 in)
PF	15	Wassef Methnani	16 – 7 August 1998	1.97 m (6 ft 6 in)
C	18	Belhssan Chihi	16 – 19 August 1998	1.95 m (6 ft 5 in)

Head coach

- (Tunisia) Aoun Monaem

Assistant coach(es)

- (Tunisia) Oualid Zrida

Legend

- (C) Team captain
- Club field describes current club

== Uganda ==
Uganda men's national U18 basketball team – 2016 FIBA Africa Championship - 9th place roster
Players
Coaches

Pos.	No.	Name	Age – Date of birth	Height	Club	Ctr.
	4	Gideon Kasasa	16 – 19 October 1998
	5	Mark Bamutende	16 – 7 October 1998
	6	Ivan Muhwezi	17 – 19 January 1998
	7	Elvis Ssentongo	16 – 2 May 1999
	8	Vincent Yiki	16 – 23 November 1998
	9	Henry Okoth	15 – 12 November 1999
	10	Mar Keefa Tamale	17 – 10 February 1998
	11	Joshua Kasurra	16 – 21 December 1998
	12	Joshua Duallo	16 – 8 November 1998
	13	Osama Arion	17 – 6 January 1998
	14	Mathew Ochieng	16 – 22 September 1998
	15	Innocent Ocen	16 – 5 December 1998

Head coach

- (Uganda) Nicholas Natuhereza

Assistant coach(es)

- (Uganda) Ronald Bajunga

Legend

- (C) Team captain
- Club field describes current club
