= Tunisia men's national under-19 basketball team =

Tunisia
- Joined FIBA: 1956
- FIBA zone: FIBA Africa
- National federation: FTBB
- Nickname(s): نسور قرطاج (Eagles of Carthage)

U19 World Cup
- Appearances: 2
- Medals: None

U18 AfroBasket
- Appearances: 7
- Medals: (silver) Silver: 2 (2010, 2014); (bronze) Bronze: 1 (1977)
Home	Away
Medal record
Event	1st	2nd	3rd
U18 AfroBasket	0	2	1
Total	0	2	1

The Tunisia men's national under-18 and under-19 basketball team (Arabic: منتخب تونس تحت 19 سنة لكرة السلة), nicknamed Les Aigles de Carthage (The Eagles of Carthage or The Carthage Eagles), is a national basketball team of Tunisia governed by the Tunisia Basketball Federation (FTBB) (Arabic: الجامعة التونسية لكرة السلة). It represents the country in international under-18 and under-19 men's basketball competitions.

== Competitive record ==
Champions Runners-up Third place Fourth place

- Red border color indicates tournament was held on home soil.

=== FIBA Under-19 Basketball World Cup ===
FIBA Under-19 Basketball World Cup
Appearances: 2
Year	Position	Host
(Brazil) 1979	Did not qualify	Salvador, Brazil
(Spain) 1983	Did not qualify	Palma de Mallorca, Spain
(Italy) 1987	Did not qualify	Bormio, Italy
(Canada) 1991	Did not qualify	Edmonton, Canada
(Greece) 1995	Did not qualify	Athens, Greece
(Portugal) 1999	Did not qualify	Lisbon, Portugal
(Greece) 2003	Did not qualify	Thessaloniki, Greece
(Serbia) 2007	Did not qualify	Novi Sad, Serbia
(Australia) 2009	Did not qualify	Auckland, Australia
(Latvia) 2011	16th	Riga, Latvia
(Czech Republic) 2013	Did not qualify	Prague, Czech Republic
(Greece) 2015	16th	Heraklion, Greece
(Egypt) 2017	Did not qualify	Cairo, Egypt
(Greece) 2019	Did not qualify	Heraklion, Greece
(Latvia) 2021	Did not qualify	Daugavpils / Riga, Latvia
(Hungary) 2023	Did not qualify	Debrecen, Hungary
(Switzerland) 2025	Did not qualify	Lausanne, Switzerland
(Czech Republic) 2027	To be determined	Brno, Czech Republic
(Indonesia) 2029	To be determined	TBD, Indonesia

=== FIBA U18 AfroBasket ===
FIBA U18 AfroBasket
Appearances: 7
Year	Position	Host
(Egypt) 1977	3rd Bronze (bronze)	Cairo, Egypt
(Angola) 1980	Did not participate	Luanda, Angola
(Mozambique) 1982	Did not participate	Maputo, Mozambique
(Egypt) 1984	Did not participate	Cairo, Egypt
(Nigeria) 1987	Did not participate	Abuja, Nigeria
(Mozambique) 1988	Did not participate	Maputo, Mozambique
(Angola) 1990	Did not participate	Luanda, Angola
(Cameroon) 1994	Did not participate	Yaounde, Cameroon
(Egypt) 1998	5th	Alexandria, Egypt
(Guinea) 2000	Did not qualify	Conakry, Guinea
(Egypt) 2002	Did not qualify	Cairo, Egypt
(South Africa) 2006	Did not qualify	Durban, South Africa
(Egypt) 2008	Did not qualify	Alexandria, Egypt
(Rwanda) 2010	2nd Silver (silver)	Kigali, Rwanda
(Mozambique) 2012	6th	Maputo, Mozambique
(Madagascar) 2014	2nd Silver (silver)	Antananarivo, Madagascar
(Rwanda) 2016	4th	Kigali, Rwanda
(Mali) 2018	7th	Bamako, Mali
(Egypt) 2020	Did not qualify	Cairo, Egypt
(Madagascar) 2022	Did not qualify	Antananarivo, Madagascar
(South Africa) 2024	Did not qualify	Pretoria, South Africa

== See also ==
- Tunisia men's national basketball team
- Tunisia men's national under-20 basketball team
- Tunisia men's national under-16 basketball team
- Tunisia women's national under-19 basketball team
