= Angola men's national under-18 and under-19 basketball team =

Angola
- FIBA ranking: 37 ▲1 (Dec. 2024)
- Joined FIBA: 1979
- FIBA zone: FIBA Africa
- National federation: FAB Portuguese: Federação Angolana de Basquetebol
- Coach: Raúl Duarte

U19 World Cup
- Appearances: 6
- Medals: None

U18 AfroBasket
- Appearances: 19
- Medals: (gold) Gold: 4 (1980, 1982, 1988, 2016); (silver) Silver: 7 (1984, 1987, 1990, 1994, 2000, 2002, 2008); (bronze) Bronze: 2 (1998, (2006)
Away

The Angola men's national under-18 and under-19 basketball team is a national basketball team of Angola, administered by the Federação Angolana de Basquetebol. It represents the country in international under-18 and under-19 basketball competitions. At continental level, it competes at the FIBA U18 AfroBasket which is eligible for the FIBA Under-19 Basketball World Cup. Angola has been a member of FIBA since 1979.

== U18 AfroBasket record ==
| Year | Reached | Position | GP | W | L | GS | GA | GD |
|---|---|---|---|---|---|---|---|---|
| (Egypt) Cairo 1977 | Did not participate | | | | | | | |
| (Angola) Luanda 1980 | round robin | 1st | | | | | | − |
| (Mozambique) Maputo 1982 | round robin | 1st | | | | | | − |
| (Egypt) Cairo 1984 | round robin | 2nd | | | | | | − |
| (Nigeria) Abuja 1987 | round robin | 2nd | | | | | | − |
| (Mozambique) Maputo 1988 | round robin | 1st | | | | | | − |
| (Angola) Luanda 1990 | round robin | 2nd | | | | | | − |
| (Cameroon) Yaoundé 1994 | round robin | 2nd | 6 | 4 | 2 | 459 | 471 | −12 |
| (Egypt) Cairo 1998 | round robin | 3rd | 5 | 3 | 2 | 328 | 305 | +23 |
| (Guinea) Conakry 2000 | round robin | 2nd | 6 | 4 | 2 | 324 | 284 | +40 |
| (Egypt) Cairo 2002 | Final | 2nd | 5 | 3 | 2 | 360 | 375 | −15 |
| (South Africa) Durban 2006 | Semi-finals | 3rd | 6 | 4 | 2 | 391 | 340 | +51 |
| (Egypt) Alexandria 2008 | Final | 2nd | 8 | 5 | 3 | 532 | 469 | +63 |
| (Rwanda) Kigali 2010 | Quarter-finals | 7th | 7 | 2 | 5 | 359 | 453 | −94 |
| (Mozambique) Maputo 2012 | Quarter-finals | 5th | 8 | 4 | 4 | 425 | 433 | −8 |
| (Madagascar) Antananarivo 2014 | Semi-finals | 4th | 7 | 3 | 4 | 492 | 475 | +17 |
| (Rwanda) Kigali 2016 | Final | 1st | 8 | 8 | 0 | 728 | 471 | +257 |
| (Mali) Bamako 2018 | Semi-finals | 4th | 7 | 4 | 3 | 514 | 491 | 23 |
| (Egypt) Cairo 2020 | Did not participate | | | | | | | |
| (Madagascar) Antananarivo 2022 | Semi-finals | 4th | 7 | 3 | 4 | 395 | 448 | –53 |
| (South Africa) Pretoria 2024 | Quarter-finals | 6th | 6 | 3 | 3 | 393 | 386 | +7 |
| Total | 19/21 | 4 titles | 72 | 43 | 29 | 5,700 | 5,401 | +299 |

== U19 World Cup record ==
| Year | Reached | Position | GP | W | L | GS | GA | GD |
|---|---|---|---|---|---|---|---|---|
| (Brazil) Salvador 1979 | Did not qualify | | | | | | | |
| (Spain) Palma de Mallorca 1983 | Group stage | 13th | 7 | 1 | 6 | 471 | 593 | −122 |
| (Italy) Bormio 1987 | Did not qualify | | | | | | | |
| (Canada) Edmonton 1991 | Group stage | 13th | 8 | 3 | 5 | 548 | 659 | −111 |
| (Greece) Athens 1995 | Group stage | 14th | 8 | 1 | 7 | 525 | 707 | −182 |
| (Portugal) Lisbon 1999 | Did not qualify | | | | | | | |
| (Greece) Thessaloniki 2003 | Group stage | 13th | 8 | 3 | 5 | 562 | 614 | −52 |
| (Serbia) Novi Sad 2007 | Did not qualify | | | | | | | |
| (Australia) Auckland 2009 | Group stage | 14th | 5 | 1 | 4 | 269 | 406 | −137 |
| (Latvia) Riga 2011 | Did not qualify | | | | | | | |
| (Czech Republic) Prague 2013 | Did not qualify | | | | | | | |
| (Greece) Heraklion 2015 | Did not qualify | | | | | | | |
| (Egypt) Cairo 2017 | Group stage | 13th | 7 | 3 | 4 | 459 | 487 | –28 |
| (Greece) Heraklion 2019 | Did not qualify | | | | | | | |
| (Latvia) Riga 2021 | Did not qualify | | | | | | | |
| (Hungary) Debrecen 2023 | Did not qualify | | | | | | | |
| (Switzerland) Lausanne 2025 | Did not qualify | | | | | | | |
| Czech Republic 2027 | To be determined | | | | | | | |
| Indonesia 2029 | To be determined | | | | | | | |
| Total | 6/19 | 0 titles | 43 | 12 | 31 | 2,834 | 3,466 | −632 |

== Roster ==
Angola U-19 Basketball Team - 2017 FIBA World Cup roster
Players
Coaches

| Pos. | No. | Name | Age – Date of birth | Height | Club |
|---|---|---|---|---|---|---|
| PG | 4 | Eric Amândio | 19 – 15 June 1998 | 1.90 m (6 ft 3 in) | West Oaks Academy | (United States) |
| PG | 5 | Childe Dundão (C) | 19 – 17 May 1998 | 1.67 m (5 ft 6 in) | Petro de Luanda | (Angola) |
| PF | 6 | Sílvio Sousa | 18 – 7 October 1998 | 2.05 m (6 ft 9 in) | Montverde Academy | (United States) |
| SG | 7 | Selton Miguel | 16 – 24 October 2000 | 1.91 m (6 ft 3 in) | Impact Basketball Academy | (United States) |
| SG | 8 | Geraldo Santos | 19 – 1 May 1998 | 1.90 m (6 ft 3 in) | Vila Clotilde | (Angola) |
| C | 10 | Rifen Miguel | 18 – 4 May 1999 | 2.01 m (6 ft 7 in) | West Oaks Academy | (United States) |
| C | 11 | Jonatão Ndjungu | 19 – 17 June 1998 | 2.05 m (6 ft 9 in) | Interclube | (Angola) |
| SG | 12 | Mílton Valente | 18 – 28 September 1998 | 1.95 m (6 ft 5 in) | 1º de Agosto | (Angola) |
| SF | 14 | Tárcio Domingos | 19 – 13 June 1998 | 1.94 m (6 ft 4 in) | 1º de Agosto | (Angola) |
| PF | 15 | Cristiano Xavier | 19 – 7 January 1998 | 1.99 m (6 ft 6 in) | Petro de Luanda | (Angola) |
| SG | 16 | Levy Miguel | 19 – 16 May 1998 | 1.90 m (6 ft 3 in) | Canarias Basketball Academy | (Spain) |
| SF | 17 | Melvyn da Silva | 17 – 14 July 1999 | 1.98 m (6 ft 6 in) | JA Vichy-Clermont Métropole | (France) |

Head coach

- Raúl Duarte

Assistant coach(es)

- Joaquim Pinto
- José Pontes

Legend

- (C) Team captain
- nat field describes country

== Head coach position ==
- (Angola) Manuel Silva Gi

== Manager history ==
- Raúl Duarte 2017
- Manuel Silva Gi 2016
- Carlos Dinis 2014
- Elvino Dias 2012
- Carlos Dinis 2008
- J.C. Guimarães 2004
- M. Sousa Necas 2000, 2002, 2006
- Wlademiro Romero 1988

== Players ==
Angola men's u18 and u19 basketball players

=== 2012–2017 ===
A = African championship; A = African championship winner; W = World cup

| # | Name | A | P | H | Club | E.D. | Dinis | Gi | R.D. |
| # | Name | A | P | H | Club | 2012 | 2014 | 2016 | 2017 |
| # | Name | A | P | H | Club | A | A | A | W |
|---|---|---|---|---|---|---|---|---|---|
| - | Aldair Carlos | 18 | F | 1.88 | (United States) LAU | - | 9 | - | - |
| - | António Congo | 18 | F | 1.97 | (Angola) PET | - | 7 | - | - |
| - | Ayrton Dala | 18 | C | 1.98 | (Angola) INT | - | 11 | - | - |
| - | Bruno Fernandes | 17 | C | 2.07 | (United States) MVA | - | - | 13 | - |
| - | Bruno Neves | 18 | F | 1.96 | (Angola) SCB | - | 8 | - | - |
| - | Carlos Cabral | 17 | - | 1.88 | (Angola) PRI | 13 | - | - | - |
| 5 | Childe Dundão | 19 | PG | 1.70 | (Angola) PET | - | - | 4 | 2017 |
| - | Cley Cabanga | 18 | F | 1.87 | (Angola) PET | - | - | 7 | - |
| - | Cristiano Gomes | 18 | PF | 2.03 | (United States) POR | - | - | 10 | - |
| 15 | Cristiano Xavier | 19 | SF | 1.99 | (Angola) PET | - | - | 15 | 2017 |
| - | Dilson Piedade | 17 | C | 2.03 | (Angola) PRI | - | 14 | - | - |
| 4 | Eric Amândio | 19 | PG | 1.86 | (United States) WOA | - | - | - | 2017 |
| - | Fernando Kambuando | 17 | - | 1.94 | (Angola) PRI | 10 | - | - | - |
| - | Francisco Mieze | 18 | - | 2.02 | (Angola) VIL | 12 | - | - | - |
| 8 | Geraldo Santos | 19 | SG | 1.87 | (Angola) VIL | - | - | 8 | 2017 |
| - | Gerson Domingos | 18 | G | 1.81 | (Angola) VIL | - | 5 | - | - |
| - | Gerson Gonçalves | 18 | F | 1.91 | (Angola) PET | - | 13 | - | - |
| - | Glofate Buiamba | 17 | F | 1.97 | (Angola) ASA | - | - | 9 | - |
| - | Ismael Monteiro | 18 | G | 1.67 | (Angola) PET | - | - | 5 | - |
| - | Ivanádio Menezes | 18 | - | 1.91 | (Angola) PRI | 6 | - | - | - |
| - | Joaquim Pedro | 17 | - | 1.76 | (Angola) PET | 8 | - | - | - |
| - | Joel Domingos | 18 | - | 1.96 | (Angola) PRI | 9 | - | - | - |
| - | Joel Fernandes | 18 | - | 2.02 | (Angola) PET | 15 | - | - | - |
| - | Joel Francisco | 17 | - | 1.92 | (Angola) PET | 7 | - | - | - |
| 11 | Jonatão Ndjungu | 18 | C | 2.03 | (Angola) INT | - | - | 11 | 2017 |
| - | José Kipanda | 17 | - | 1.88 | (Angola) PRI | 5 | - | - | - |
| - | José Neto | 18 | C | 1.97 | (Angola) SCB | - | 10 | - | - |
| - | Júlio Cambudi | 18 | F | 1.86 | (Angola) PRI | - | 6 | - | - |
| 16 | Levy Miguel | 19 | SG | 1.90 | (Spain) CBA | - | - | - | 2017 |
| - | Martinho Paulo | 18 | C | 1.95 | (Angola) PET | - | 12 | - | - |
| 17 | Melvyn da Silva | 18 | SF | 1.98 | (France) JAVC | - | - | - | 2017 |
| 12 | Milton Valente | 18 | F | 1.95 | (Angola) PRI | - | - | 12 | 2017 |
| - | Moisés César | 17 | C | 2.00 | (Angola) SCB | - | 15 | - | - |
| - | Reginaldo Kanza | 18 | - | 1.99 | (Angola) PRI | 4 | - | - | - |
| 10 | Rifen Miguel | 18 | C | 2.02 | (United States) WOA | - | - | - | 2017 |
| 7 | Selton Miguel | 18 | SG | 1.94 | (United States) IBA | - | - | - | 2017 |
| 6 | Sílvio Sousa | 18 | PF | 2.06 | (United States) MVA | - | - | 6 | 2017 |
| - | Simão Lutonda | 18 | G | 1.87 | (Angola) PET | - | 4 | - | - |
| 14 | Tárcio Domingos | 19 | SF | 1.94 | (Angola) PRI | - | - | 14 | 2017 |
| - | Teotónio Dó | 18 | - | 2.04 | (Angola) PRI | 11 | - | - | - |

=== 2002–2010 ===
A = African championship; W = World cup

| Name | A | P | H | Club | Necas | | JCG | Necas | Carlos Dinis | | – |
| Name | A | P | H | Club | 2002 | 2003 | 2004 | 2006 | 2008 | 2009 | 2010 |
| Name | A | P | H | Club | A | W | A | A | A | W | A |
|---|---|---|---|---|---|---|---|---|---|---|---|
| Adalberto António | | | | (Angola) NOC | - | - | - | 14 | - | - | - |
| Adilson Ramos | 17 | | | (Angola) PET | - | - | - | 9 | - | - | - |
| Agostinho Coelho | 19 | PF | 1.98 | (Angola) CDU | - | - | - | - | - | 11 | - |
| Alfredo Simões | 18 | | | — | - | - | - | 4 | - | - | - |
| Bráulio Morais | 19 | SG | 1.90 | (Angola) PET | - | - | - | - | 6 | 6 | - |
| Carlos Morais | 19 | | | (Angola) PET | 6 | 6 | 2004 | - | - | - | - |
| Domingos Bonifácio | 20 | | | (Angola) INT | 12 | 12 | 2004 | - | - | - | - |
| Edivaldo Cardoso | 17 | C | 2.04 | (Angola) PET | - | - | - | - | 11 | - | - |
| Edson Ndoniema | 18 | SG | 1.91 | (Angola) PRI | - | - | - | - | 4 | 4 | - |
| Eduardo Ferreira | 19 | SF | 1.92 | (Angola) CDU | - | - | - | 7 | 7 | 7 | - |
| Emanuel António | 19 | PG | 1.80 | (Angola) CDU | - | - | - | - | 10 | 10 | - |
| Emanuel Neto | 19 | | | (Angola) PET | 5 | 5 | - | - | - | - | - |
| Ezequiel Silva | 18 | | | (Angola) ASA | - | - | - | 11 | - | - | - |
| Francisco Luano | 18 | | | (Angola) PRI | - | - | 2004 | 12 | - | - | - |
| Helder Gonçalves | 17 | | | (Angola) NOC | - | - | - | 6 | - | - | - |
| Hermenegildo Mbunga | 19 | | | (Angola) PET | 15 | 15 | 2004 | - | - | - | - |
| Hermenegildo Santos | 19 | SG | 1.91 | (Angola) PRI | - | - | - | - | 9 | 9 | - |
| Hermenegildo Tandala | | | | — | - | - | - | 8 | - | - | - |
| Islando Manuel | 18 | SF | 1.92 | (Angola) PRI | - | - | - | - | 13 | 13 | - |
| Jackson Afonso | | | | (Angola) PRI | - | - | - | 13 | - | - | - |
| Joao Filho | 17 | C | 1.96 | (Angola) ASA | - | - | - | - | 12 | 12 | - |
| Jose Garcia | | | | (United States) | - | - | 2004 | - | - | - | - |
| Jose Santos | 19 | | | (Angola) PRI | 4 | 4 | - | - | - | - | - |
| Josemar de Carvalho | 19 | PF | 1.96 | (Angola) CDU | - | - | - | - | 8 | 8 | - |
| Luís Mário | | | | (Angola) PMD | - | - | 2004 | - | - | - | - |
| Manuel Mariano | 17 | | | (Angola) PET | - | - | 2004 | - | - | - | - |
| Mayzer Alexandre | 19 | | | (Angola) PRI | 9 | 9 | - | - | - | - | - |
| Michel Santos | 18 | | | (Angola) NOC | 8 | 8 | 2004 | - | - | - | - |
| Miguel Kiala | 19 | C | 1.98 | (Angola) CDU | - | - | - | - | 15 | 15 | - |
| Mílton Barros | 20 | | | (Angola) PET | 14 | 14 | 2004 | - | - | - | - |
| Paulo Barros | 17 | | | (Angola) BAN | - | - | - | 5 | - | - | - |
| Paulo Muquixe | 19 | | | (Angola) PRI | 11 | 11 | 2004 | - | - | - | - |
| Romualdo António | | | | (Angola) SCC | - | - | 2004 | - | - | - | - |
| Sanu Maria | 20 | | | (Angola) NOC | 10 | 10 | 2004 | - | - | - | - |
| Simão João | 17 | | | (Angola) PRI | - | - | - | 10 | - | - | - |
| Tsheke Mvumbi | 18 | | | (Angola) PRI | 13 | 13 | - | - | - | - | - |
| Valdelício Joaquim | 16 | C | 2.08 | — | - | - | - | 15 | - | - | - |
| Wilson Manuel | 18 | | | (Angola) VIS | 7 | 7 | - | - | - | - | - |
| Yanick Moreira | 18 | C | 2.04 | (Angola) PRI | - | - | - | - | 5 | 5 | - |
| Yuri Demba | 19 | PG | 1.80 | (Angola) CDU | - | - | - | - | 14 | 14 | - |

=== 1991–2000 ===
A = African championship; W = World cup

| Name | A | P | H | Club | – | – | Necas | N.T. | Necas |
| Name | A | P | H | Club | 1991 | 1994 | 1995 | 1998 | 2000 |
| Name | A | P | H | Club | W | A | W | A | A |
|---|---|---|---|---|---|---|---|---|---|
| Adolfo Quimbamba | 18 | | | (Angola) | - | - | - | 1998 | 2000 |
| Alberto Beltron | | | | (Angola) | - | - | - | - | 2000 |
| Almerindo Celestino | 19 | | | (Angola) | - | - | 9 | - | - |
| Antero da Silva | | | | (Angola) | - | - | - | - | 2000 |
| Armando Binge | 17 | | | (Angola) | - | - | 4 | - | - |
| Bizi Manuel | | | | (Angola) | - | - | - | - | 2000 |
| Bruno Gomes | - | - | | (Angola) | - | - | - | 1998 | - |
| Cardoso Casimiro | 17 | | | (Angola) | - | - | 8 | - | - |
| Carlos Adelino | - | - | | (Angola) | - | - | - | 1998 | - |
| Carlos Almeida | 19 | | | (Angola) | - | - | 14 | - | - |
| Carlos António | 19 | | | (Angola) | 5 | - | - | - | - |
| Carlos Martins | 19 | | | (Angola) | 10 | - | - | - | - |
| Carlos Mendes | 19 | | | (Angola) | - | - | 6 | - | - |
| Constantino Dias | | | | (Angola) | - | - | - | 1998 | 2000 |
| Damas Manuel | - | - | | (Angola) | - | - | - | 1998 | - |
| Domingos Bonifácio | 16 | | | (Angola) | - | - | - | - | 2000 |
| Edmar Victoriano | 16 | | | (Angola) | 15 | - | - | - | - |
| Ernesto Tchiengo | 20 | | | (Angola) | 14 | - | - | - | - |
| Faustino dos Santos | - | - | | (Angola) | - | - | - | 1998 | - |
| Felisberto João | - | - | | (Angola) | - | - | - | 1998 | - |
| Filomeno Zacarias | | | | (Angola) | - | - | - | - | 2000 |
| Francisco Horácio | - | - | | (Angola) | - | - | - | 1998 | - |
| Garcia Domingos | 20 | | | (Angola) | 13 | - | - | - | - |
| Gaspar Neto | 19 | | | (Angola) | 12 | - | - | - | - |
| Gerson Betel | 17 | | | (Angola) | 6 | - | - | - | - |
| João Calei | 19 | | | (Angola) | - | - | 10 | - | - |
| Joaquim Gomes Kikas | - | - | | (Angola) | - | - | - | 1998 | - |
| Jose Santos | | | | (Angola) | - | - | - | - | 2000 |
| Jose Santos | 17 | | | (Angola) | - | - | 12 | - | - |
| Marcelino Chipongue | | | | (Angola) | - | - | - | - | 2000 |
| Mario Belarmino | 17 | | | (Angola) | 11 | - | - | - | - |
| Miguel Lutonda | 20 | | | (Angola) | 7 | - | - | - | - |
| Milton Barros | 16 | | | (Angola) | - | - | - | - | 2000 |
| Olímpio Cipriano | 18 | | | (Angola) | - | - | - | - | 2000 |
| Rui Guimarães | 19 | | | (Angola) | - | - | 13 | - | - |
| Rui Paulo | 18 | | | (Angola) | 8 | - | - | - | - |
| Pedro Kialunda | 19 | | | (Angola) | - | - | 15 | - | - |
| Sardinha Caetano | 19 | | | (Angola) | - | - | 11 | - | - |
| Sergio Morais | 19 | | | (Angola) | 9 | - | - | - | - |
| Silvio Lemos | 18 | | | (Angola) | 4 | - | - | - | - |
| Simão Cunga | 19 | | | (Angola) | - | - | 5 | - | - |
| Simão Santos | - | - | | (Angola) | - | - | - | 1998 | - |
| Sizenando Sobrinho | - | - | | (Angola) | - | - | - | 1998 | - |
| Valdir Santos | | | | (Angola) | - | - | - | 1998 | 2000 |
| Vicente Neto | 19 | | | (Angola) | - | - | 7 | - | - |

=== 1980–1990 ===
A = African championship; A = African championship winner; W = World cup

| Name | A | P | H | Club | Mário Palma | | – | T.S. | – | W.R. | – |
| Name | A | P | H | Club | 1980 | 1982 | 1983 | 1984 | 1987 | 1988 | 1990 |
| Name | A | P | H | Club | A | A | W | A | A | A | A |
|---|---|---|---|---|---|---|---|---|---|---|---|
| Adriano Pedro | - | - | - | (Angola) | | 1982 | 12 | | | | |
| Agostinho Matamba | - | - | - | (Angola) | | 1982 | 7 | | | | |
| Aguinaldo Silva Buda | - | C | 1.95 | (Angola) | 12 | | | | | | |
| Alfredo Sousa Mamoeiro | - | C | | (Angola) | 13 | | | | | | |
| Amaral António Aleixo | 17 | G | 1.78 | (Angola) PET | | 1982 | | | | | |
| Aníbal Moreira | 18 | F | 1.93 | (Angola) | | | 5 | 1984 | | | |
| Armando João Lapa | - | G | | (Angola) LEO | 7 | 1982 | 6 | | | | |
| Artur Barros | 20 | C | 1.92 | (Angola) | 10 | | | | | | |
| Carlos Silva | - | PF | - | (Angola) | 5 | | | | | | |
| Domingos Pereira | - | - | - | (Angola) | | | 8 | | | | |
| Fernando Manuel Mendes Gonçalves Kayaya | 17 | C | - | (Angola) PRI | | 1982 | 11 | | | | |
| Gil Alves Almeida | - | - | - | (Angola) FER | | 1982 | | | | | |
| Helder Cruz | - | - | - | (Angola) | | | | | | 1988 | |
| Jacinto Neto | - | - | - | (Angola) | 4 | | | | | | |
| Jean-Jacques Conceição | 19 | C | 2.00 | (Angola) PRI | | 1982 | 15 | | | | |
| João Luís Viega da Fonseca Kol | 20 | - | - | (Angola) PET | | 1982 | 4 | | | | |
| Joaquim Dias Covilhã | - | - | - | (Angola) PRI | | 1982 | 9 | | | | |
| Jorge Baptista | - | - | - | (Angola) | | | | | | 1988 | |
| José Carlos Guimarães | 19 | G | 1.90 | (Angola) LEO | 14 | 1982 | 14 | | | | |
| Manuel Francisco da Silva Clemente Júnior Nijó | - | - | - | (Angola) PRI | | 1982 | 10 | | | | |
| Manuel Silva Gi | - | - | - | (Angola) | | | | 1984 | | | |
| Mario Alberto Marito | - | - | - | (Angola) | 8 | | | | | | |
| Mario Neto | - | - | - | (Angola) | | | | 1984 | | | |
| Nelson Ferreira Nocas | - | F | - | (Angola) | 15 | | | | | | |
| Paulo Madeira | - | - | - | (Angola) | | | | | | 1988 | |
| Paulo Sucaquexi | - | - | - | (Angola) | | 1982 | | | | | |
| Rui Neto | - | PF | - | (Angola) | 11 | | | | | | |
| Ventura Garcia Tó | - | - | - | (Angola) | 9 | | | | | | |
| Victor Almeida | - | G | - | (Angola) | 6 | | | | | | |

== See also ==
- Angola men's national basketball team
- Angola men's national under-16 and under-17 basketball team
- Angola women's national under-18 and under-19 basketball team
- Angolan Basketball Federation
