= 2016 FIBA Africa U18 Championship =

2016 FIBA U18 AfroBasket
17th FIBA Under-18 African Basketball Championship

Tournament details
- Host country: Rwanda
- Dates: 22–31 July 2016
- Teams: 11 (from 1 confederation)
- Venue: 1 (in 1 host city)

Final positions
- Champions: Angola (4th title)

Tournament statistics
- MVP: (Angola) Sílvio Sousa
- Top scorer: (Uganda) Ochieng 19.3
- Top rebounds: (Uganda) Ochieng 9.8
- Top assists: (Egypt) Youssef 3.1
- PPG (Team): Angola 61.9
- RPG (Team): Egypt 42.9
- APG (Team): Egypt 15.5

Official website
- 2016 FIBA Africa Under-18 Championship

The 2016 FIBA U18 African Championship was the 17th edition, played under the rules of FIBA, the world governing body for basketball, and the FIBA Africa thereof. The tournament was hosted by Rwanda from July 22 to 31, with the games played at the Amahoro Stadium in Kigali.

Angola defeated Egypt 86–82 in the final to win their 4th title. The tournament qualified all three medallists to the 2017 Under-19 World Championship.

== Draw ==
Group A	Group B
Algeria; Gabon; Ivory Coast; Mali; Rwanda	Angola; Benin; DR Congo; Egypt; Tunisia; Uganda

== Preliminary round ==
All times are local (UTC+2).

=== Group A ===
Qualified for the quarter-finals

Team	W	L	PF	PA	Diff	Pts.
Mali	4	0	287	191	+96	8
Rwanda	3	1	261	230	+31	7
Algeria	2	2	250	222	+28	6
Ivory Coast	1	3	231	263	−32	5
Gabon	0	4	223	346	−123	4

22 July 2016
15:00

Boxscore

Ivory Coast	44–63	Mali
Scoring by quarter: 14-11, 6-19, 14-12, 10-21
Pts: Bah 11; Rebs: Gogoua 7 Asts: Djehi 2		Pts: Haidara 14; Rebs: Keita 8 Asts: Camara 3

Amahoro Stadium, Kigali

22 July 2016
18:00

Boxscore

Gabon	64–94	Rwanda
Scoring by quarter: 9-24, 12-23, 22-25, 21-22
Pts: Nze Mba 21; Rebs: Dimidimba 6 Asts: Djeni 2		Pts: Mukizi 22; Rebs: Kisa 5 Asts: Nshizirungu 5

Amahoro Stadium, Kigali

23 July 2016
11:15

Boxscore

Gabon	52–84	Algeria
Scoring by quarter: 14-27, 11-23, 15-20, 12-14
Pts: Nze Mba 16; Rebs: Akoue 3 Asts: Akoue 1		Pts: Sahbi 17; Rebs: Hailouf 8 Asts: Haichour 5

Amahoro Stadium, Kigali

23 July 2016
18:00

Boxscore

Rwanda	74–65	Ivory Coast
Scoring by quarter: 17-20, 24-11, 10-15, 23-19
Pts: Kisa 17; Rebs: Furaha 6 Asts: Furaha 4		Pts: Bah 16; Rebs: Bah 4 Asts: Bah, Sie 2

Amahoro Stadium, Kigali

24 July 2016
18:00

Boxscore

Mali	61–40	Rwanda
Scoring by quarter: 9-17, 15-2, 12-8, 25-13
Pts: Traore 26; Rebs: Sissoko 5 Asts: Haidara 3		Pts: Jean Mukizi 10; Rebs: three players 6 Asts: Mukizi 3

Amahoro Stadium, Kigali

24 July 2016
20:15

Boxscore

Ivory Coast	45–58	Algeria
Scoring by quarter: 6-10, 12-18, 10-20, 17-10
Pts: Djehi 11; Rebs: Djehi 10; Asts: Diarra 2		Pts: Braik 18; Rebs: Hailouf 14; Asts: Boussad 3

Amahoro Stadium, Kigali

26 July 2016
15:45

Boxscore

Gabon	68–77	Ivory Coast
Scoring by quarter: 11-23, 15-18, 18-19, 24-17
Pts: Nze Mba 21; Rebs: Dimidimba 9 Asts: Nze Mba 3		Pts: Camara 22; Rebs: Camara 9 Asts: Cissé 7

Amahoro Stadium, Kigali

26 July 2016
18:00

Boxscore

Algeria	68–72	Mali
Scoring by quarter: 16-18, 20-16, 14-23, 18-15
Pts: Hailouf 19; Rebs: Hailouf 11; Asts: Braik, Hamdi 3		Pts: Traore 15; Rebs: Dembele 14; Asts: Traore 3

Amahoro Stadium, Kigali

27 July 2016
11:15

Boxscore

Mali	91–39	Gabon
Scoring by quarter: 26-6, 16-15, 27-7, 22-11
Pts: five players 11; Rebs: Dembele 10; Asts: Samake 3		Pts: Nze Mba 11; Rebs: Nze Mba, Dimidimba 5 Asts: Akoue, Nguyabama 1

Amahoro Stadium, Kigali

27 July 2016
18:00

Boxscore

Rwanda	53–40	Algeria
Scoring by quarter: 11-6, 9-10, 13-11, 20-13
Pts: Furaha 13; Rebs: Furaha, Shema 15; Asts: Shema 4		Pts: Sahbi 10; Rebs: Hailouf 8 Asts: Boussad 3

Amahoro Stadium, Kigali

=== Group B ===
Qualified for the quarter-finals

Team	W	L	PF	PA	Diff	Pts.
Angola	5	0	465	284	+181	10
Egypt	4	1	461	277	+184	9
Tunisia	3	2	353	312	+41	8
DR Congo	2	3	409	374	+35	7
Uganda	1	4	324	417	−93	6
Benin	0	5	209	557	−348	5

22 July 2016
11:00

Boxscore

DR Congo	79–61	Uganda
Scoring by quarter: 16-4, 22-24, 21-19, 20-14
Pts: Kabenga 24; Rebs: Mianga 14; Asts: Kabenga 6		Pts: Ochieng; Rebs: Ochieng; Asts: Muhwezi

Amahoro Stadium, Kigali

22 July 2016
13:00

Boxscore

Angola	66–56	Tunisia
Scoring by quarter: 12-6, 12-20, 19-17, 23-13
Pts: Sílvio 24; Rebs: Sílvio 7 Asts: Ismael, Geraldo 2		Pts: Marnaoui 20; Rebs: Rassil 7 Asts: Rassil 2

Amahoro Stadium, Kigali

22 July 2016
20:00

Boxscore

Benin	25–141	Egypt
Scoring by quarter: 9-34, 4-35, 6-33, 6-39
Pts: Ouikoun 7 Rebs: Toukourou 4 Asts: three players 1		Pts: Raafat 26; Rebs: Khalaf 16; Asts: Youssef 7

Amahoro Stadium, Kigali

23 July 2016
13:30

Boxscore

Egypt	87–48	Uganda
Scoring by quarter: 25-12, 20-6, 20-21, 22-9
Pts: Raafat 19; Rebs: Khalaf 10; Asts: Farag 2		Pts: Ochieng 16; Rebs: Ochieng 10; Asts: Muhwezi 2

Amahoro Stadium, Kigali

23 July 2016
15:45

Boxscore

Benin	29–127	Angola
Scoring by quarter: 4-35, 12-24, 10-39, 3-29
Pts: Toukourou 10; Rebs: four players 2 Asts: Ouikoun, Alidou 2		Pts: Bruno 33; Rebs: Sílvio 5 Asts: Childe 4

Amahoro Stadium, Kigali

23 July 2016
20:15

Boxscore

Tunisia	70–67	DR Congo
Scoring by quarter: 12-19, 18-13, 20-11, 20-24
Pts: Rassil 21; Rebs: Selmi 8 Asts: Selmi 2		Pts: Kazumba 16; Rebs: Kazumba 7 Asts: Kazumba, Basima 2

Amahoro Stadium, Kigali

24 July 2016
11:15

Boxscore

Uganda	59–105	Angola
Scoring by quarter: 12-35, 16-18, 18-27, 13-25
Pts: Ochieng 17; Rebs: Ochieng 11; Asts: Arion 3		Pts: Bruno 21; Rebs: Jonatão 6 Asts: Bruno 4

Amahoro Stadium, Kigali

24 July 2016
13:30

Boxscore

Tunisia	86–33	Benin
Scoring by quarter: 20-8, 19-10, 24-7, 23-8
Pts: Jaziri 12; Rebs: Chrigui 7 Asts: Ben Salah 3		Pts: Ouikoun 9 Rebs: Toukourou 6 Asts: five players 1

Amahoro Stadium, Kigali

24 July 2016
15:45

Boxscore

DR Congo	68–95	Egypt
Scoring by quarter: 17-27, 15-17, 18-29, 18-22
Pts: Kazumba 29; Rebs: Mianga 3 Asts: Kabenga 2		Pts: Khalaf 18; Rebs: Khalaf 9 Asts: Elraei 2

Amahoro Stadium, Kigali

26 July 2016
11:15

Boxscore

Angola	83–75	DR Congo
Scoring by quarter: 29-14, 14-24, 18-17, 22-20
Pts: Sílvio 22; Rebs: Bruno 9 Asts: Bruno, Dundão 2		Pts: Kazumba 26; Rebs: Mianga 5 Asts: Mianga, Basima 3

Amahoro Stadium, Kigali

26 July 2016
13:30

Boxscore

Benin	57–83	Uganda
Scoring by quarter: 4-20, 19-20, 23-20, 11-23
Pts: Toukourou 16; Rebs: Alidou 3 Asts: Tchaby, Tchaby 4		Pts: Muhwezi 16; Rebs: Arion 4 Asts: Muhwezi 6

Amahoro Stadium, Kigali

26 July 2016
15:45

Boxscore

Gabon	68–77	Ivory Coast
Scoring by quarter: 11-23, 15-18, 18-19, 24-17
Pts: Mba 21; Rebs: Dimidimba 9 Asts: Mba 3		Pts: Camara 22; Rebs: Camara 9 Asts: Cissé 7

Amahoro Stadium, Kigali

27 July 2016
13:30

Boxscore

Uganda	73–89	Tunisia
Scoring by quarter: 21-20, 18-23, 18-19, 16-27
Pts: Ochieng 25; Rebs: Ochieng 7 Asts: four players 1		Pts: Rassil 23; Rebs: Selmi 5 Asts: Mansour 3

Amahoro Stadium, Kigali

27 July 2016
15:45

Boxscore

DR Congo	120–65	Benin
Scoring by quarter: 29-19, 28-18, 28-15, 35-13
Pts: Basima 32; Rebs: Mulamba 11; Asts: Mulamba, Kabantu 4		Pts: Tchaby 20; Rebs: Ouikoun 8 Asts: Ouikoun 4

Amahoro Stadium, Kigali

27 July 2016
20:15

Boxscore

Egypt	65–84	Angola
Scoring by quarter: 14-13, 16-26, 14-27, 21-18
Pts: Elraei 11; Rebs: Elraei, Khalaf 6 Asts: Youssef 3		Pts: Bruno 26; Rebs: Sílvio 15; Asts: Ismael 3

Amahoro Stadium, Kigali

== Knockout stage ==
All times are local (UTC+2).

Championship bracket

Quarter-finals
Fri 29 Jul 2016 – 13:30
Ivory Coast	47
Angola	85
Fri 29 Jul 2016 – 18:00
Tunisia	68
Rwanda	51
Fri 29 Jul 2016 – 15:45
Algeria	74
Egypt	82
Fri 29 Jul 2016 – 20:15
DR Congo	58
Mali	85

Semi-finals
Sat 30 Jul 2016 – 18:00
Angola	92
Tunisia	58
Sat 30 Jul 2016 – 20:15
Egypt	77
Mali	74

Final
Sun 31 Jul 2016 – 19:00
Angola	86
Egypt	82
Third place
Sun 31 Jul 2016 – 16:45
Mali	59
Tunisia	52

5-8th bracket

5th-8th place
Sat 30 Jul 2016 – 13:30
DR Congo	77
Algeria	66
Sat 30 Jul 2016 – 15:45
Ivory Coast	74
Rwanda	76

Fifth place
Sun 31 Jul 2016 – 14:30
DR Congo	73
Rwanda	77
Seventh place
Sun 31 Jul 2016 – 12:15
Algeria	55
Ivory Coast	54

9-11th bracket

9th–11th place
Fri 29 Jul 2016 – 11:15
Benin	57
Gabon	74

Ninth place
Sat 30 Jul 2016 – 11:15
Uganda	70
Gabon	66

=== Quarter finals ===
29 July 2016
13:30

Boxscore

Ivory Coast	47–85	Angola
Scoring by quarter: 14-24, 12-20, 7-30, 14-11
Pts: Camara 16; Rebs: Camara 8 Asts: Camara 3		Pts: Bruno 16; Rebs: Bruno, Sílvio 9 Asts: Childe 3

Amahoro Stadium, Kigali

29 July 2016
15:45

Boxscore

Algeria	74–82	Egypt
Scoring by quarter: 13-13, 15-22, 17-24, 29-23
Pts: Boussad 21; Rebs: Hamdi 11; Asts: Aggoun 3		Pts: three players 14; Rebs: Mostafa 11; Asts: Ramadan 4

Amahoro Stadium, Kigali

29 July 2016
18:00

Boxscore

Tunisia	68–51	Rwanda
Scoring by quarter: 24-13, 10-15, 19-19, 15-4
Pts: Rassil 18; Rebs: Selmi 16; Asts: Mansour 3		Pts: Kayonga 17; Rebs: Furaha 8 Asts: Mukiza, Sano 3

Amahoro Stadium, Kigali

29 July 2016
20:15

Boxscore

DR Congo	58–85	Mali
Scoring by quarter: 16-28, 12-18, 12-18, 18-21
Pts: Basima 16; Rebs: Basima 6 Asts: Basima 5		Pts: Doumbia 14; Rebs: Dembele 9 Asts: Haidara 3

Amahoro Stadium, Kigali

=== 9−11th place classification ===
29 July 2016
11:15

Boxscore

Benin	57–74	Gabon
Scoring by quarter: 10-10, 23-20, 8-23, 16-21
Pts: Ouikoun 21; Rebs: Ouikoun 10; Asts: Kpanou 3		Pts: Nze Mba 23; Rebs: Nze Mba, Dimidimba 10; Asts: Dimidimba 3

Amahoro Stadium, Kigali

=== 9th place match ===
30 July 2016
11:15

Boxscore

Uganda	70–66	Gabon
Scoring by quarter: 12-12, 19-2, 22-34, 17-18
Pts: Ochieng 24; Rebs: Ochieng 13; Asts: Muhwezi, Bamutende 5		Pts: Nze Mba 23; Rebs: Nze Mba 7 Asts: Ntoutoume 3

Amahoro Stadium, Kigali

=== 5–8th place classification ===
30 July 2016
14:30

Boxscore

DR Congo	77–66	Algeria
Scoring by quarter: 8-16, 27-16, 20-11, 22-23
Pts: Mianga 22; Rebs: Mianga, Mulamba 10; Asts: Mianga 6		Pts: Sahbi 17; Rebs: Chebel 10; Asts: Bouadjadja 3

Amahoro Stadium, Kigali

30 July 2016
16:45

Boxscore

Ivory Coast	74–76	Rwanda
Scoring by quarter: 17-19, 21-20, 21-9, 15-28
Pts: Camara 20; Rebs: Djehi 10; Asts: Camara, Cissé 2		Pts: Furaha 23; Rebs: Furaha 10; Asts: Kazeneka 3

Amahoro Stadium, Kigali

=== Semifinals ===
30 July 2016
19:00

Boxscore

Angola	92–58	Tunisia
Scoring by quarter: 25-16, 20-12, 28-19, 19-11
Pts: Sílvio 18; Rebs: Sílvio 8 Asts: Bruno 5		Pts: Rassil 23; Rebs: Rassil 6 Asts: Rassil 3

Amahoro Stadium, Kigali

30 July 2016
21:15

Boxscore

Mali	74–77	Egypt
Scoring by quarter: 23-18, 16-20, 18-16, 17-23
Pts: Traore 14; Rebs: Keita 9 Asts: Haidara 4		Pts: Elsandily 20; Rebs: three players 7 Asts: Youssef 3

Amahoro Stadium, Kigali

=== 7th place match ===
31 July 2016
12:15

Boxscore

Algeria	55–54	Ivory Coast
Scoring by quarter: 15-15, 17-10, 15-16, 8-13
Pts: Hamdi 16; Rebs: Chebel 8 Asts: Boussad 4		Pts: Camara, Cissé 12; Rebs: Djehi 13; Asts: Cissé 5

Amahoro Stadium, Kigali

=== 5th place match ===
31 July 2016
14:30

Boxscore

DR Congo	73–77	Rwanda
Scoring by quarter: 15-15, 14-23, 19-19, 25-20
Pts: Mianga 30; Rebs: Mianga 9 Asts: Kabenga 3		Pts: Furaha 29; Rebs: Furaha, A.Nkusi 6 Asts: Mukizi 4

Amahoro Stadium, Kigali

=== Bronze medal match ===
31 July 2016
16:45

Boxscore

Mali	59–52	Tunisia
Scoring by quarter: 17-18, 15-10, 9-9, 18-15
Pts: Doumbia 16; Rebs: Sissoko 12; Asts: Camara, Dembele 2		Pts: Rassil 16; Rebs: Rassil 8 Asts: Jaziri 2

Amahoro Stadium, Kigali

=== Final ===
31 July 2016
19:00

Boxscore

Egypt	82–86 (OT)	Angola
Scoring by quarter: 16-25, 24-16, 21-17, 16-19, Overtime: 5-9
Pts: Youssef 15; Rebs: Khalaf 12; Asts: Youssef 7		Pts: Bruno 21; Rebs: Bruno, Sílvio 10; Asts: Cabanga 4

Amahoro Stadium, Kigali

== Final standings ==
Qualified for the 2017 Under-19 World Cup

Rank	Team	Record
Gold medal	Angola	8–0
Silver medal	Egypt	6–2
Bronze medal	Mali	6–1
4	Tunisia	4–4
5	Rwanda	5–2
6	DR Congo	3–5
7	Algeria	3–4
8	Ivory Coast	1–6
9	Uganda	2–4
10	Gabon	1–5
11	Benin	0–6

== Awards ==
2016 FIBA Africa Under-18 Championship Winner

Angola
Fourth title

Team roster: Bruno Fernandes, Childe Dundão, Cley Cabanga, Cristiano Gomes, Cristiano Xavier, Geraldo Santos, Glofate Buiamba, Ismael Monteiro, Jonatão Ndjungu, Mílton Valente, Sílvio Sousa, Tárcio Domingos
Head coach: Manuel Silva Gi

Most Valuable Player
(Angola) Sílvio Sousa

=== All-Tournament Team ===
- PG – (Rwanda) Gasana Sano
- SG — (Egypt) Tarek Raafat
- SF – (Tunisia) Mohamed Rassil
- PF – (Angola) Sílvio Sousa (MVP)
- C – (Angola) Bruno Fernandes

== Statistical leaders ==
=== Individual Tournament Highs ===
Points

Rank	Name	G	Pts	PPG
1	(Uganda) Mathew Ochieng	6	116	19.3
2	(Gabon) Kevin Nze Mba	6	115	19.2
3	(Democratic Republic of the Congo) Patrick Kazumba	8	150	18.8
4	(Angola) Bruno Fernandes	8	146	18.3
5	(Angola) Sílvio Sousa	8	137	17.1
6	(Tunisia) Mohamed Rassil	8	133	16.6
7	(Rwanda) Cadeau Furaha	7	108	15.4
8	(Egypt) Tarek Raafat	8	114	14.3
9	(Mali) Ousmane Traore	7	97	13.9
10	(Democratic Republic of the Congo) Philippe Kabenga	8	109	13.6

Rebounds

Rank	Name	G	Rbs	RPG
1	(Uganda) Mathew Ochieng	6	59	9.8
2	(Egypt) Ahmed Khalaf	8	76	9.5
3	(Angola) Sílvio Sousa	8	61	7.6
4	(Rwanda) Cadeau Furaha	7	53	7.6
5	(Mali) Sekou Dembele	7	52	7.4
5	(Ivory Coast) Franck Djehi	7	52	7.4
7	(Egypt) Esam Mostafa	8	58	7.3
8	(Algeria) Abderrahmane Hailouf	7	49	7.0
9	(Tunisia) Mohamed Selmi	8	54	6.8
10	(Angola) Bruno Fernandes	8	53	6.6

Assists

Rank	Name	G	Ast	APG
1	(Egypt) Mohamed Youssef	8	25	3.1
2	(Ivory Coast) Isaac Cissé	6	17	2.8
2	(Uganda) Ivan Muhwezi	6	17	2.8
4	(Democratic Republic of the Congo) Jospin Basima	8	22	2.8
5	(Rwanda) Jean Mukiza	7	18	2.6
6	(Egypt) Omar Farag	8	20	2.5
6	(Democratic Republic of the Congo) Philippe Kabenga	8	20	2.5
8	(Angola) Childe Dundão	8	19	2.4
9	(Algeria) Mohamed Boussad	7	15	2.1
9	(Mali) Lassana Haidara	7	15	2.1

Steals

Rank	Name	G	Sts	SPG
1	(Uganda) Gideon Kasasa	6	11	1.8
1	(Benin) Jean Ouikoun	6	11	1.8
3	(Algeria) Mohamed Boussad	7	12	1.7
4	(Uganda) Elvis Ssentongo	6	10	1.7
4	(Benin) Apollinaire Tchaby	6	10	1.7
6	(Gabon) Farrel Dimidimba	6	9	1.5
6	(Uganda) Ivan Muhwezi	6	9	1.5
8	(Ivory Coast) Bi Gildas Bah	7	10	1.4
9	(Angola) Childe Dundão	8	11	1.4
9	(Angola) Ismael Monteiro	8	11	1.4

Blocks

Rank	Name	G	Bks	BPG
1	(Egypt) Ahmed Khalaf	8	22	2.8
2	(Angola) Bruno Fernandes	8	13	1.6
3	(Democratic Republic of the Congo) Patrick Kazumba	8	11	1.4
4	(Gabon) Kevin Nze Mba	6	7	1.2
5	(Ivory Coast) Franck Djehi	7	7	1.0
5	(Rwanda) Osborn Shema	7	7	1.0
7	(Benin) Babatounde Epaminondas	6	6	1.0
8	(Algeria) Louai Chebel	7	6	0.9
8	(Mali) Ibrahim Doumbia	7	6	0.9
10	(Mali) Moulaye Sissoko	6	5	0.8

Turnovers

Rank	Name	G	Tos	TPG
1	(Benin) Apollinaire Tchaby	6	30	5.0
2	(Uganda) Ivan Muhwezi	6	28	4.7
2	(Uganda) Mathew Ochieng	6	28	4.7
4	(Benin) Jean Ouikoun	6	23	3.8
5	(Uganda) Henry Okoth	6	22	3.7
6	(Egypt) Mohamed Youssef	8	29	3.6
7	(Ivory Coast) Adama Camara	7	25	3.6
8	(Algeria) Ibrahim Haichour	7	25	3.6
9	(Angola) Bruno Fernandes	8	27	3.4
10	(Benin) Abdel Toukourou	6	20	3.3

2-point field goal percentage

Pos	Name	A	M	%
1	(Angola) Bruno Fernandes	58	42	72.4
2	(Egypt) Ahmed Khalaf	68	48	70.6
3	(Angola) Sílvio Sousa	69	48	69.6
4	(Egypt) Tarek Raafat	50	34	68.0
5	(Egypt) Seifeldin Elsandily	51	34	66.7
6	(Democratic Republic of the Congo) Jospin Basima	66	40	60.6
7	(Uganda) Mathew Ochieng	74	44	59.5
8	(Tunisia) Oussama Marnaoui	49	28	57.1
9	(Tunisia) Mohamed Selmi	51	28	54.9
10	(Rwanda) Cadeau Furaha	70	38	54.3

3-point field goal percentage

Pos	Name	A	M	%
1	(Gabon) Gleen Akoue	12	6	50
2	(Algeria) Mostefa Braik	17	8	47.1
3	(Ivory Coast) Louis Sie	18	8	44.4
4	(Tunisia) Haroun Mansour	16	7	43.8
5	(Tunisia) Mohamed Rassil	39	17	43.6
6	(Angola) Geraldo Santos	32	13	40.6
7	(Angola) Bruno Fernandes	25	10	40.0
8	(Uganda) Elvis Ssentongo	20	8	40.0
9	(Democratic Republic of the Congo) Toussaint Nzuiki	10	4	40.0
10	(Algeria) Zakaria Aggoun	13	5	38.5

Free throw percentage

Pos	Name	A	M	%
1	(Angola) Childe Dundão	35	27	77.1
2	(Mali) Ousmane Traore	42	32	76.2
3	(Tunisia) Mohamed Rassil	50	38	76.0
4	(Angola) Bruno Fernandes	43	32	74.4
5	(Benin) Apollinaire Tchaby	18	13	72.2
6	(Gabon) Kevin Nze Mba	57	39	68.4
7	(Ivory Coast) Adama Camara	44	29	65.9
8	(Algeria) Mohamed Boussad	47	30	63.8
9	(Uganda) Henry Okoth	29	18	62.1
10	(Uganda) Mathew Ochieng	46	28	60.9

=== Individual Game Highs ===
Department	Name	Total	Opponent
Points	(Angola) Bruno Fernandes	33	Benin
Rebounds	(Egypt) Ahmed Khalaf (Tunisia) Mohamed Selmi	16	Benin; Rwanda
Assists	four players	7	
Steals	(Gabon) Farrel Dimidimba	7	Benin
Blocks	(Angola) Bruno Fernandes	6	Ivory Coast
2-point field goal percentage	(Egypt) Tarek Raafat	100% (10/10)	Benin
3-point field goal percentage	(Angola) Bruno Fernandes	100% (3/3)	Uganda
Free throw percentage	(Algeria) Mostefa Braik	100% (7/7)	Ivory Coast
Turnovers	(Angola) Bruno Fernandes	9	Egypt

=== Team Tournament Highs ===
Points

Rank	Name	G	Pts	PPG
1	Angola	8	728	91
2	Egypt	8	702	87.8
3	DR Congo	8	617	77.1
4	Mali	7	505	72.1
5	Rwanda	7	465	66.4
6	Tunisia	8	531	66.4
7	Uganda	6	394	65.7
8	Algeria	7	445	63.6
9	Gabon	6	363	60.5
10	Ivory Coast	7	406	58.0

Rebounds

Rank	Name	G	Rbs	RPG
1	Egypt	8	343	42.9
2	Mali	7	296	42.3
3	Algeria	7	262	37.4
4	Angola	8	291	36.4
5	Uganda	6	214	35.7
6	Rwanda	7	238	34.0
7	Ivory Coast	7	233	33.3
8	DR Congo	8	264	33.0
9	Gabon	6	183	30.5
10	Tunisia	8	237	29.6

Assists

Rank	Name	G	Ast	APG
1	Egypt	6	124	15.5
2	Angola	7	99	12.4
3	DR Congo	7	95	11.9
4	Rwanda	6	82	11.7
5	Algeria	6	75	10.7
6	Uganda	7	64	10.7
7	Mali	7	65	9.3
8	Benin	4	50	8.3
9	Ivory Coast	6	55	7.9
10	Tunisia	6	57	7.1

Steals

Rank	Name	G	Sts	SPG
1	Angola	8	73	9.1
2	Uganda	6	49	8.2
2	Benin	6	44	7.3
4	Mali	7	51	7.3
5	Egypt	8	55	6.9
6	Algeria	7	43	6.1
7	DR Congo	8	47	5.9
8	Ivory Coast	7	36	5.1
9	Gabon	6	26	4.3
10	Rwanda	7	29	4.1

Blocks

Rank	Name	G	Bks	BPG
1	Egypt	8	34	4.3
2	Angola	8	29	3.6
3	Gabon	6	21	3.5
4	Algeria	7	19	2.7
5	Mali	7	18	2.6
6	DR Congo	8	17	2.1
7	Ivory Coast	7	11	1.6
7	Rwanda	7	11	1.6
9	Benin	6	9	1.5
10	Tunisia	8	10	1.3

Turnovers

Rank	Name	G	Tos	TPG
1	Uganda	6	149	24.8
2	Benin	6	145	24.2
3	Algeria	7	133	19.0
4	Ivory Coast	7	120	17.1
5	Angola	8	134	16.8
6	DR Congo	8	129	16.1
7	Egypt	8	125	15.6
8	Gabon	6	91	15.2
9	Rwanda	7	106	15.1
10	Mali	7	89	12.7

2-point field goal percentage

Pos	Name	A	M	%
1	Egypt	367	225	61.3
2	Angola	321	186	57.9
3	Mali	281	147	52.3
4	Uganda	240	125	52.1
5	DR Congo	392	201	51.3
6	Rwanda	264	134	50.8
7	Tunisia	296	143	48.3
8	Gabon	212	96	45.3
9	Algeria	248	111	44.8
10	Ivory Coast	278	115	41.4

3-point field goal percentage

Pos	Name	A	M	%
1	Angola	182	63	34.6
2	Egypt	169	50	29.6
3	DR Congo	136	39	28.7
4	Tunisia	136	37	27.2
5	Algeria	167	45	26.9
6	Rwanda	142	37	26.1
7	Uganda	84	21	25.0
8	Ivory Coast	109	26	23.9
9	Benin	93	21	22.6
9	Mali	172	36	20.9

Free throw percentage

Pos	Name	A	M	%
1	Tunisia	209	134	64.1
2	Angola	270	167	61.9
3	Gabon	173	102	59.0
4	Uganda	145	81	55.9
5	Egypt	184	102	55.4
6	Rwanda	159	86	54.1
7	Algeria	163	88	54.0
8	Mali	193	103	53.4
9	DR Congo	189	98	51.9
10	Benin	67	33	49.3

=== Team Game highs ===
Department	Name	Total	Opponent
Points	Egypt	141	Benin
Rebounds	Egypt	74	Benin
Assists	Egypt	42	Benin
Steals	Angola	21	Ivory Coast
Blocks	Egypt	10	Benin
2-point field goal percentage	Angola	80.4% (45/56)	Benin
3-point field goal percentage	DR Congo; Egypt	66.7% (6/9)	Tunisia; DR Congo
Free throw percentage	Egypt	84.6% (11/13)	Tunisia
Turnovers	Benin	35	Egypt

== See also ==
- 2015 FIBA Africa Under-16 Championship
