= 2018 FIBA U18 African Championship =

2018 FIBA U18 AfroBasket
18th FIBA Under-18 African Basketball Championship

Tournament details
- Host country: Mali
- City: Bamako
- Dates: 24 August – 2 September
- Teams: 11 (from 1 confederation)
- Venue: 1 (in 1 host city)

Final positions
- Champions: Mali (1st title)

Official website
- www.fiba.basketball

The 2018 FIBA U18 African Championship was the 18th edition, played under the rules of FIBA, the world governing body for basketball, and the FIBA Africa thereof. The tournament was hosted by Mali from 24 August to 2 September 2018 in Bamako. The finalists of this championship earned the right to represent the continent at the 2019 FIBA Under-19 Basketball World Cup in Greece.

== Hosts selection ==
On 23 March 2018, FIBA Africa Central Board announced that Bamako, Mali as the host city for the tournament.

== Qualification ==
| Event | Date | Location | Vacancies | Qualified |
|---|---|---|---|---|
| 2018 AfroBasket U18 Preliminaries Zone 1 | Unknown | (Algeria) Unknown | 1+1 | Tunisia; Algeria |
| 2018 AfroBasket U18 Preliminaries Zone 2 | 10−12 July 2018 (Note: Four countries initially participated: hosts Guinea, Sierra Leone, Cape Verde and the eventual zone winner Senegal. The tournament was played in round-robin format. Mali qualified as the tournament hosts.) | (Guinea) Conakry | 1+1+1 | Mali; Senegal; Guinea |
| 2018 AfroBasket U18 Preliminaries Zone 3 | Unknown | (Ghana) Unknown | NA | NA |
| 2018 AfroBasket U18 Preliminaries Zone 4 | Unknown | Unknown | 1 | DR Congo |
| 2018 AfroBasket U18 Preliminaries Zone 5 | 17–22 June 2018 (Note: Four countries participated: hosts Tanzania, Uganda, Sudan and the eventual zone winner Rwanda. The tournament was played in round-robin format.) | (Tanzania) Dar es Salaam | 1+1 | Egypt; Rwanda |
| 2018 AfroBasket U18 Preliminaries Zone 6 | Unknown | (Mozambique) Unknown | 1 | Angola |
| 2018 AfroBasket U18 Preliminaries Zone 7 | Unknown | (Madagascar) Unknown | 1 | Madagascar |
| Total | | | 10 | |

== Qualified teams ==
- Mali − Tournament hosts
- Angola − Zone VI
- Egypt − Zone V
- Tunisia − Zone I
- Rwanda − Zone V Winner
- Madagascar − Zone VII
- Senegal − Zone II Winner
- Algeria − Zone I
- DR Congo − Zone IV
- Guinea − Zone II
- Uganda
- Ivory Coast – withdrew

== Preliminary round ==
All times are local (UTC+2).

=== Group A ===
| Qualified for the quarter-finals |

| Team | W | L | PF | PA | Diff | Pts. |
|---|---|---|---|---|---|---|
| Mali | 5 | 0 | 563 | 256 | +307 | 10 |
| Egypt | 4 | 1 | 424 | 324 | +100 | 9 |
| DR Congo | 3 | 2 | 364 | 369 | -5 | 8 |
| Libya | 2 | 3 | 281 | 419 | −138 | 7 |
| Uganda | 1 | 4 | 293 | 381 | −88 | 6 |
| Guinea | 0 | 5 | 291 | 467 | −176 | 5 |

24 August 2018
15:45

Boxscore

| DR Congo | 83–51 | Uganda |
Scoring by quarter: 21-12, 18-6, 22-20, 22-13
| Pts: Kasereka 23; Rebs: Tshunza 9 Asts: Zola 2 | | Pts: Baale 16; Rebs: Dauna 6 Asts: Baale 4 |

Palais des Sports Salamatou Maiga, Bamako

24 August 2018
19:00

Boxscore

| Mali | 141–49 | Guinea |
Scoring by quarter: 37-6, 42-10, 28-20, 34-13
| Pts: Diabate 27; Rebs: Drame 16; Asts: Kanouté 8 | | Pts: Mara 18; Rebs: Ba 14; Asts: Ba 3 |

Palais des Sports Salamatou Maiga, Bamako

24 August 2018
21:15

Boxscore

| Libya | 38–115 | Egypt |
Scoring by quarter: 10-17, 9-21, 10-44, 9-33
| Pts: Alharari 10; Rebs: Masoud 5 Asts: AlFaqiyah 1 | | Pts: Hussein 27; Rebs: Elmadawy 8 Asts: Elmadawy 3 |

Palais des Sports Salamatou Maiga, Bamako

25 August 2018
12:15

Boxscore

| Guinea | 61–111 | Egypt |
Scoring by quarter: 17-26, 5-28, 15-24, 24-33
| Pts: Mara 18; Rebs: Bangoura 8 Asts: Cissoko 2 | | Pts: Zakr 26; Rebs: Hussein 8 Asts: Morsy 6 |

Palais des Sports Salamatou Maiga, Bamako

25 August 2018
14:30

Boxscore

| DR Congo | 73–69 | Libya |
Scoring by quarter: 21-8, 15-22, 17-23, 20-16

Palais des Sports Salamatou Maiga, Bamako

25 August 2018
19:00

Boxscore

| Uganda | 55–112 | Mali |
Scoring by quarter: 15-29, 14-26, 11-30, 15-27
| Pts: Kimambo 23; Rebs: Wallujo 11; Asts: Baale 4 | | Pts: Ballo 17; Rebs: Ballo 13; Asts: Kanouté 7 |

Palais des Sports Salamatou Maiga, Bamako

26 August 2018
10:00

Boxscore

| Guinea | 74–85 | DR Congo |
Scoring by quarter: 18-18, 21-11, 18-30, 17-26
| Pts: Mara 23; Rebs: Bah 16; Asts: Bah 7 | | Pts: Kasereka 29; Rebs: Ngalamulume 13; Asts: Kasereka 8 |

Palais des Sports Salamatou Maiga, Bamako

26 August 2018
12:15

Boxscore

| Uganda | 57–60 | Libya |
Scoring by quarter: 16-13, 12-17, 17-16, 12-14
| Pts: Baale 19; Rebs: Wallujo 9 Asts: Kimambo 3 | | Pts: Zeew 24; Rebs: Rizq 7 Asts: Alfaqiyah 3 |

Palais des Sports Salamatou Maiga, Bamako

26 August 2018
19:15

Boxscore

| Mali | 93–47 | Egypt |
Scoring by quarter: 18-14, 29-12, 23-7, 23-14
| Pts: Diabate 17; Rebs: Coulibaly 12; Asts: Kanouté 5 | | Pts: Hassan 8 Rebs: Elkholefy 7 Asts: Elmadawy 3 |

Palais des Sports Salamatou Maiga, Bamako

28 August 2018
10:00

Boxscore

| Uganda | 64–43 | Guinea |
Scoring by quarter: 14-14, 17-13, 15-13, 18-3
| Pts: Kasobya 16; Rebs: Matsiko 13; Asts: Baale 6 | | Pts: Bah 13; Rebs: Bah 24; Asts: Camara 1 |

Palais des Sports Salamatou Maiga, Bamako

28 August 2018
16:45

Boxscore

| Egypt | 68–66 | DR Congo |
Scoring by quarter: 12-10, 13-17, 19-17, 24-22
| Pts: Hassan 19; Rebs: Elmadawy 14; Asts: Elmadawy 10 | | Pts: Kasereka 24; Rebs: Ngalamulume 14; Asts: Kasereka 6 |

Palais des Sports Salamatou Maiga, Bamako

28 August 2018
19:00

Boxscore

| Mali | 110–48 | Libya |
| Pts: Drame 17; Rebs: Keita 9 Asts: Kanouté 8 | | Pts: Zeew 13; Rebs: Rizq 8 Asts: AlFaqiyah 4 |

Palais des Sports Salamatou Maiga, Bamako

29 August 2018
10:00

Boxscore

| Egypt | 83–66 | Uganda |
Scoring by quarter: 20–11, 21–16, 16–18, 26–21
| Pts: Hassan 24; Rebs: Elmadawy 9 Asts: Elmadawy 4 | | Pts: Baale 26; Rebs: Kimambo 8 Asts: Kasobya 2 |

Palais des Sports Salamatou Maiga, Bamako

29 August 2018
12:15

Boxscore

| Libya | 66–64 | Guinea |
Scoring by quarter: 15–16, 19–17, 17–16, 15–15
| Pts: Zeew 27; Rebs: Zeew 9 Asts: Alshoushan 3 | | Pts: Kourouma 15; Rebs: A.F.Camara 14; Asts: A.M.Camara 5 |

Palais des Sports Salamatou Maiga, Bamako

29 August 2018
19:00

Boxscore

| DR Congo | 57–107 | Mali |
Scoring by quarter: 8–22, 19–30, 13–27, 17–28
| Pts: Kasereka 21; Rebs: Ngalamulume 9 Asts: Boteya 3 | | Pts: Kanouté 18; Rebs: Drame 9 Asts: Kanouté 4 |

Palais des Sports Salamatou Maiga, Bamako

=== Group B ===
| Qualified for the quarter-finals |

| Team | W | L | PF | PA | Diff | Pts. |
|---|---|---|---|---|---|---|
| Senegal | 4 | 0 | 327 | 234 | +93 | 8 |
| Angola | 3 | 1 | 315 | 274 | +41 | 7 |
| Rwanda | 2 | 2 | 292 | 300 | -8 | 6 |
| Tunisia | 1 | 3 | 248 | 294 | -46 | 5 |
| Algeria | 0 | 4 | 241 | 321 | −80 | 4 |
| Ivory Coast | 0 | 0 | 0 | 0 | 0 | 0 |

24 August 2018
11:00

Boxscore

| Algeria | 63–81 | Rwanda |
Scoring by quarter: 21-9, 7-27, 17-24, 18-21
| Pts: Mellak 12; Rebs: Mellak 12; Asts: Bouzidi 4 | | Pts: Nkundwa 31; Rebs: Nkundwa 14; Asts: Irumwa 5 |

Palais des Sports Salamatou Maiga, Bamako

25 August 2018
13:00

Boxscore

| Tunisia | 58–62 | Rwanda |
Scoring by quarter: 8-9, 18-16, 13-12, 19-25
| Pts: Toumi 15; Rebs: Mahemly 5 Asts: Guizani 3 | | Pts: Umuhoza 19; Rebs: Ngoga 7 Asts: Nkundwa 3 |

Palais des Sports Salamatou Maiga, Bamako

25 August 2018
20:00

Boxscore

| Angola | 76–77 | Senegal |
Scoring by quarter: 24-20, 25-14, 15-24, 12-19
| Pts: Konde 18; Rebs: Dinis 7 Asts: Miguel 3 | | Pts: Faye 18; Rebs: Sylla 13; Asts: Diop 4 |

Palais des Sports Salamatou Maiga, Bamako

26 August 2018
20:00

Boxscore

| Senegal | 70–50 | Algeria |
Scoring by quarter: 21-11, 14-13, 12-14, 23-12
| Pts: Faye 14; Rebs: Faye 20; Asts: Boissy 4 | | Pts: Benzidoum 11; Rebs: Bouzidi 7 Asts: Bouzidi 3 |

Palais des Sports Salamatou Maiga, Bamako

26 August 2018
13:00

Boxscore

| Rwanda | 79–80 | Angola |
Scoring by quarter: 13-14, 18-25, 18-14, 30-27
| Pts: Ngoga 18; Rebs: Kazeneza 14; Asts: Umuhoza 4 | | Pts: Miguel 13; Rebs: Kibinga 13; Asts: Miguel 4 |

Palais des Sports Salamatou Maiga, Bamako

27 August 2018
16:45

Boxscore

| Angola | 73–68 | Tunisia |
Scoring by quarter: 24-19, 12-19, 18-17, 19-13
| Pts: Konde 23; Rebs: Alexandre 12; Asts: Konde 6 | | Pts: Mahemly 16; Rebs: Mili 8 Asts: Yahyaoui 6 |

Palais des Sports Salamatou Maiga, Bamako

28 August 2018
12:15

Boxscore

| Angola | 86–50 | Algeria |
Scoring by quarter: 32-20, 15–5, 19–12, 20–13
| Pts: Gomes 19; Rebs: Sebastiao 9 Asts: Biongo 2 | | Pts: Yazizain 15; Rebs: Yazizain 8 Asts: Mouffok 2 |

Palais des Sports Salamatou Maiga, Bamako

28 August 2018
14:30

Boxscore

| Senegal | 81–38 | Tunisia |
Scoring by quarter: 17-16, 18-4, 28-9, 18-9
| Pts: Faye 28; Rebs: Faye 17; Asts: Boissy 8 | | Pts: Toumi 9 Rebs: Zaghouani 8 Asts: Mahemley 2 |

Palais des Sports Salamatou Maiga, Bamako

29 August 2018
14:30

Boxscore

| Algeria | 78–84 (OT) | Tunisia |
Scoring by quarter: 20–14, 10-15, 19–22, 23–21, Overtime: 6–12
| Pts: Rahal 21; Rebs: Yazizain 12; Asts: Bouzidi 7 | | Pts: Mahemly, Toumi 18; Rebs: Yahyaoui 12; Asts: Ben Taher 6 |

Palais des Sports Salamatou Maiga, Bamako

29 August 2018
16:45

Boxscore

| Rwanda | 70–99 | Senegal |
Scoring by quarter: 9–27, 18-26, 22–23, 21–23
| Pts: Ngoga 15; Rebs: Ngoga 10; Asts: Irumva, Kazeneza 4 | | Pts: Faye 26; Rebs: Faye 17; Asts: Boissy, Sylla 5 |

Palais des Sports Salamatou Maiga, Bamako

== Knockout stage ==
All times are local (UTC+2).

Championship bracket

Quarter-finals
Fri 31 Aug 2018 – 12:15
Libya | 52
Senegal | 87
Fri 31 Aug 2018 – 14:30
DR Congo | 44
Angola | 62
Fri 31 Aug 2018 – 16:45
Rwanda | 66
Egypt | 89
Fri 31 Aug 2018 – 19:00
Tunisia | 54
Mali | 105

Semi-finals
Sat 1 Sep 2018 – 16:45
Senegal | 91
Egypt | 82
Sat 1 Sep 2018 – 19:00
Mali | 84
Angola | 59

Final
Sun 2 Sep 2018 – 19:00
Mali | 78
Senegal | 76
Third place
Sun 2 Sep 2018 – 16:45
Angola | 78
Egypt | 89

5th–8th place bracket

5th-8th place
Sat 1 Sep 2018 – 12:15
Libya | 68
Rwanda | 92
Sat 1 Sep 2018 – 14:30
Tunisia | 57
DR Congo | 69

Fifth place
Sun 2 Sep 2018 – 14:30
DR Congo | 79
Rwanda | 69
Seventh place
Sun 2 Sep 2018 – 12:15
Tunisia | 85
Libya | 74

9th–11th place bracket

9th–11th place
Fri 31 Aug 2018 – 10:00
Guinea | 77
Algeria | 70

Ninth place
Sat 1 Sep 2018 – 10:00
Uganda | 60
Guinea | 65

=== Quarterfinals ===
31 August 2018
12:15

Boxscore

| Libya | 52–87 | Senegal |
Scoring by quarter: 11-22, 16-19, 10-17, 15–29
| Pts: Zeew 25; Rebs: Alharari 5 Asts: Albaraesi, Zeew 2 | | Pts: Faye 25; Rebs: Faye 16; Asts: Faye 5 |

Palais des Sports Salamatou Maiga, Bamako

31 August 2018
14:30

Boxscore

| DR Congo | 44–62 | Angola |
Scoring by quarter: 12-15, 19–11, 7–19, 6–17
| Pts: Kasereka 17; Rebs: Ngalamulume 12; Asts: Kasereka 6 | | Pts: Konde, Miguel 16; Rebs: Alexandre 12; Asts: Sebastiao 3 |

Palais des Sports Salamatou Maiga, Bamako

31 August 2018
16:45

Boxscore

| Rwanda | 66–89 | Egypt |
Scoring by quarter: 13–19, 18–22, 17–26, 18–22
| Pts: Kazeneza 25; Rebs: Kazeneza 15; Asts: Umuhoza 2 | | Pts: Ibrahim 23; Rebs: Ibrahim 10; Asts: Abdelmaged, Hassan 3 |

Palais des Sports Salamatou Maiga, Bamako

31 August 2018
19:00

Boxscore

| Tunisia | 54–105 | Mali |
Scoring by quarter: 11-21, 12-29, 17-29, 14-26
| Pts: Yahyaoui 16; Rebs: Mili 9 Asts: Mili 4 | | Pts: Coulibaly 22; Rebs: Coulibaly 12; Asts: Fofana 6 |

Palais des Sports Salamatou Maiga, Bamako

=== 9th−11th place classification ===
31 August 2018
10:00

Boxscore

| Guinea | 77–70 | Algeria |
Scoring by quarter: 10-17, 19-10, 19–15, 29–28
| Pts: Camara 31; Rebs: Bah 11; Asts: Mara 4 | | Pts: Mouffok 20; Rebs: Bouteldja, Chenieff 9 Asts: Bouteldja 5 |

Palais des Sports Salamatou Maiga, Bamako

=== 9th place match ===
1 September 2018
10:00

Boxscore

| Uganda | 60–65 | Guinea |
Scoring by quarter: 14-21, 22-12, 14–11, 10-21
| Pts: Baale 13; Rebs: Walujjo 8 Asts: Baale 5 | | Pts: Camara 31; Rebs: Bah 15; Asts: Three players 3 |

Palais des Sports Salamatou Maiga, Bamako

=== 5th–8th place classification ===
1 September 2018
12:15

Boxscore

| Libya | 68–92 | Rwanda |
Scoring by quarter: 11-22, 25-19, 19–30, 13-21
| Pts: Zeew 31; Rebs: Zeew 12; Asts: Alharari 3 | | Pts: Nkundwa 19; Rebs: Kazeneza 15; Asts: Kazeneza 4 |

Palais des Sports Salamatou Maiga, Bamako

1 September 2018
14:30

Boxscore

| Tunisia | 57–69 | DR Congo |
Scoring by quarter: 11-20, 13–22, 20-13, 13-14
| Pts: Ammari 19; Rebs: Mili 8 Asts: Guizani 3 | | Pts: Kasereka 27; Rebs: Keliki 12; Asts: Elande 8 |

Palais des Sports Salamatou Maiga, Bamako

=== Semifinals ===
1 September 2018
16:45

Boxscore

| Senegal | 91–82 (OT) | Egypt |
Scoring by quarter: 22-19, 18-18, 18-22, 14-13, Overtime: 19–10
| Pts: Faye 24; Rebs: Faye 19; Asts: Boissy 8 | | Pts: Hassan 22; Rebs: Ibrahim 10; Asts: Ibrahim 6 |

Palais des Sports Salamatou Maiga, Bamako

1 September 2018
19:00

Boxscore

| Mali | 84–59 | Angola |
Scoring by quarter: 23-18, 21-13, 26-17, 14-11
| Pts: Kanouté 21; Rebs: Coulibaly 24; Asts: Coulibaly, Diakite 4 | | Pts: Gomes, Miguel 11; Rebs: three players 5 Asts: three players 2 |

Palais des Sports Salamatou Maiga, Bamako

=== 7th place match ===
2 September 2018
12:15

Boxscore

| Tunisia | 85–74 | Libya |
Scoring by quarter: 29–21, 19-18, 25-9, 12–26
| Pts: Ammari 24; Rebs: Ammari 10; Asts: three players 3 | | Pts: Zeew 28; Rebs: Zeew 11; Asts: Omar 3 |

Palais des Sports Salamatou Maiga, Bamako

=== 5th place match ===
2 September 2018
14:30

Boxscore

| DR Congo | 79–69 | Rwanda |
Scoring by quarter: 9-16, 22-17, 31–17, 17–19
| Pts: Kasereka, Ngalamulume 26; Rebs: Ngalamulume 13; Asts: Ngalamulume 7 | | Pts: Ngoga 14; Rebs: Kazeneza 10; Asts: Turatsinze 6 |

Palais des Sports Salamatou Maiga, Bamako

=== Bronze medal match ===
2 September 2018
16:45

Boxscore

| Angola | 78–89 | Egypt |
Scoring by quarter: 17-19, 25-24, 9-21, 27-25
| Pts: Miguel 24; Rebs: Miguel 9 Asts: Miguel 4 | | Pts: Hassan 24; Rebs: Ibrahim 15; Asts: Abdelmaged 7 |

Palais des Sports Salamatou Maiga, Bamako

=== Final ===
2 September 2018
19:00

Boxscore

| Mali | 78–76 | Senegal |
Scoring by quarter: 20-23, 23-11, 10–21, 25–21

Palais des Sports Salamatou Maiga, Bamako

== Final standings ==
| Qualified for the 2019 Under-19 Basketball World Cup |

| Rank | Team | Record |
|---|---|---|
| Gold medal | Mali | 8–0 |
| Silver medal | Senegal | 6–1 |
| Bronze medal | Egypt | 6–2 |
| 4 | Angola | 4–3 |
| 5 | DR Congo | 5–3 |
| 6 | Rwanda | 3–4 |
| 7 | Tunisia | 2–5 |
| 8 | Libya | 2–6 |
| 9 | Guinea | 2–5 |
| 10 | Uganda | 1–5 |
| 11 | Algeria | 0–5 |

== Awards ==
2018 FIBA U18 African Championship Winner

Mali
First title

Most Valuable Player
(Mali) Siriman Kanouté

=== All-Tournament Team ===
- PG – (Angola) Selton Ricardo Fernandes Miguel
- SG — (Mali) Siriman Kanouté (MVP)
- SF – (Senegal) Biram Faye
- PF – (Mali) Abdoul Karim Coulibaly
- SF – (Egypt) Youssef Ossama Elmadawy
