= Egypt men's national under-19 basketball team =

Egypt
- FIBA zone: FIBA Africa
- National federation: Egyptian Basketball Federation

U19 World Cup
- Appearances: 7
- Medals: None

U18 AfroBasket
- Appearances: 13
- Medals: (gold) Gold: 6 (1977, 1984, 2008, 2010, 2014, 2022); (silver) Silver: 2 (1998, 2016); (bronze) Bronze: 3 (2012, 2018, 2020)

The Egypt men's national under-18 and under-19 basketball team is a national basketball team of Egypt, administered by the Egyptian Basketball Federation. It represents the country in international under-18 and under-19 men's basketball competitions.

== U18 AfroBasket record ==
Year	Pos.	Pld	W	L
(Egypt) 1977	1st			
(Angola) 1980	5th	4	2	2
(Mozambique) 1982				
(Egypt) 1984	1st			
(Nigeria) 1987				
(Mozambique) 1988				
(Angola) 1990				
(Cameroon) 1994	Did not enter			
(Egypt) 1998	2nd	5	4	1
(Guinea) 2000	Did not enter			
(Egypt) 2002	5th	5	3	2
(Senegal) 2004	Did not enter			
(South Africa) 2006	Did not enter			
(Egypt) 2008	1st	8	8	0
(Rwanda) 2010	1st	7	6	1
(Mozambique) 2012	3rd	8	7	1
(Madagascar) 2014	1st	7	6	1
(Rwanda) 2016	2nd	8	6	2
(Mali) 2018	3rd	8	6	2
(Egypt) 2020	3rd	5	4	1
(Madagascar) 2022	1st	7	6	1
(South Africa) 2024	5th	6	4	2
Total	13/21	78	62	16

== U19 World Cup record ==
Year	Pos.	Pld	W	L
(Brazil) 1979	12th	8	0	8
(Spain) 1983	Did not qualify			
(Italy) 1987	Did not qualify			
(Canada) 1991	Did not qualify			
(Greece) 1995	Did not qualify			
(Portugal) 1999	13th	8	4	4
(Greece) 2003	Did not qualify			
(Serbia) 2007	Did not qualify			
(Serbia) 2009	11th	8	2	6
(Latvia) 2011	12th	8	1	7
(Czech Republic) 2013	Did not qualify			
(Greece) 2015	12th	7	3	4
(Egypt) 2017	12th	7	2	5
(Greece) 2019	Did not qualify			
(Latvia) 2021	Did not qualify			
(Hungary) 2023	13th	7	2	5
(Switzerland) 2025	Did not qualify			
(Czech Republic) 2027	To be determined			
(Indonesia) 2029	To be determined			
Total	7/19	53	14	39

== See also ==
- Egypt men's national basketball team
- Egypt men's national under-17 basketball team
- Egypt women's national under-19 basketball team
