= 2002 FIBA Africa Under-18 Championship =

2002 FIBA U18 AfroBasket
11th FIBA Under-18 African Basketball Championship

Tournament details
- Host country: Egypt
- Dates: August 2–9, 2002
- Teams: 9
- Venue: 1 (in 1 host city)

Final positions
- Champions: Nigeria (5th title)

The 2002 FIBA Africa Under-18 Championship was the 11th FIBA Africa U-18 championship, played under the auspices of the Fédération Internationale de Basketball, the world basketball sport governing body. The tournament was held from August 2 to August 9, 2002 at the Indoor Sport Hall of the Cairo Stadium in Cairo, Egypt, contested by 9 national teams and won by Nigeria.

The tournament qualified the winner and the runner-up for the 2003 FIBA Under-19 World Championship.

== Format ==
- The teams were divided into two groups (Groups A+B) for the preliminary round.
- Round robin for the preliminary round; the top two teams from each group advanced to the semifinals.
- From there on a knockout system was used until the final.

== Draw ==
| Group A | Group B |
|---|---|
| Angola; Ivory Coast; Nigeria; Senegal | Algeria; Egypt; Madagascar; Mali; South Africa |

== Preliminary round ==
=== Group A ===
| Qualified for the semi-finals |

| Team | W | L | PF | PA | Diff | Pts. |
|---|---|---|---|---|---|---|
| Mali | 4 | 0 | 0 | 0 | 0 | 8 |
| Algeria | 3 | 1 | 0 | 0 | 0 | 7 |
| Egypt | 2 | 2 | 0 | 0 | 0 | 6 |
| South Africa | 1 | 3 | 0 | 0 | 0 | 5 |
| Madagascar | 0 | 4 | 0 | 0 | 0 | 4 |

| Egypt | 105–72 | Madagascar |

Indoor Sports Hall, Cairo

| Algeria | vs. | South Africa |

Indoor Sports Hall, Cairo

| Mali | vs. | Madagascar |

Indoor Sports Hall, Cairo

| South Africa | vs. | Egypt |

Indoor Sports Hall, Cairo

| Mali | vs. | Algeria |

Indoor Sports Hall, Cairo

| Madagascar | vs. | South Africa |

Indoor Sports Hall, Cairo

| South Africa | vs. | Mali |

Indoor Sports Hall, Cairo

| Algeria | vs. | Egypt |

Indoor Sports Hall, Cairo

| Egypt | vs. | Mali |

Indoor Sports Hall, Cairo

| Madagascar | vs. | Algeria |

Indoor Sports Hall, Cairo

=== Group B ===
| Qualified for the semi-finals |

| Team | W | L | PF | PA | Diff | Pts. |
|---|---|---|---|---|---|---|
| Nigeria | 3 | 0 | 241 | 164 | +77 | 8 |
| Angola | 2 | 1 | 208 | 216 | −8 | 7 |
| Ivory Coast | 1 | 2 | 0 | 0 | 0 | 6 |
| Senegal | 0 | 3 | 0 | 0 | 0 | 5 |

August 4, 2002

| Senegal | 59–87 | Nigeria |

Indoor Sports Hall, Cairo

| Angola | 70–53 | Ivory Coast |

Indoor Sports Hall, Cairo

August 5, 2002

| Ivory Coast | 47–70 | Nigeria |

Indoor Sports Hall, Cairo

| Senegal | 79–80 | Angola |

Indoor Sports Hall, Cairo

August 6, 2002

| Angola | 58–84 | Nigeria |

Indoor Sports Hall, Cairo

| Ivory Coast | vs. | Senegal |

Indoor Sports Hall, Cairo

== Knockout stage ==
Championship bracket

Semi-finals
Thu 8 Aug 2002
Nigeria | 107
Algeria | 73
Thu 8 Aug 2002
Angola | 92
Mali | 79

Final
Fri 9 Aug 2002
Nigeria | 80
Angola | 60
3rd place
Fri 9 Aug 2002
Algeria
Mali

=== 7th place match ===
August 8, 2002

| Madagascar | vs. | Senegal |

Indoor Sports Hall, Cairo

=== 5th place match ===
August 8, 2002

| Egypt | vs. | Ivory Coast |

Indoor Sports Hall, Cairo

=== Semifinals ===
August 8, 2002

| Angola | 92–79 | Mali |

Indoor Sports Hall, Cairo

| Nigeria | 107–73 | Algeria |

Indoor Sports Hall, Cairo

=== Bronze medal game ===
August 9, 2002

| Algeria | vs. | Mali |

Indoor Sports Hall, Cairo

=== Gold medal game ===
August 9, 2002

| Nigeria | 80–60 | Angola |

Indoor Sports Hall, Cairo

== Final standings ==
| Qualified for the 2003 FIBA U19 World Championship |

| Rank | Team | Record |
|---|---|---|
| Gold medal | Nigeria | 5–0 |
| Silver medal | Angola | 3–2 |
| Bronze medal | | – |
| 4. | | – |
| 5. | | – |
| 6. | | – |
| 7. | | – |
| 8. | | – |
| 9. | | – |

== Awards ==
2002 FIBA Africa Under-18 Championship winner

Nigeria
Fifth title

Most Valuable Player
