= FIBA U18 AfroBasket =

Under-18 continental basketball championship

- Most recent season or competition: 2026 FIBA U18 AfroBasket
- Formerly: FIBA U18 African Championship; FIBA Africa Under-18 Championship
- Sport: Basketball
- Founded: 1975; 51 years ago
- Organizing body: FIBA Africa
- No. of teams: 12
- Continent: Africa
- Most recent champion: Ivory Coast (1st title)
- Most titles: Egypt; Nigeria (6 titles each)
- Qualification: FIBA U19 World Cup
- Related competitions: FIBA U16 AfroBasket
- Website: fiba.basketball/history

The FIBA U18 AfroBasket, previously known as the FIBA U18 African Championship or the FIBA Africa Under-18 Championship, is a biennial international youth basketball competition consisting of under-18 men's national teams organized by FIBA Africa.

The tournament also serves as a qualification for the FIBA Under-19 Basketball World Cup, where the top two teams qualify.

== Summary ==
Year	Hosts	Final			Third place match		
Year	Hosts	Champions	Score	Runners-up	Third place	Score	Fourth place
1977; Details	(Egypt); Cairo	Egypt	round robin	Central African Empire	Tunisia	round robin	?
1980; Details	(Angola); Luanda	Angola	90−81	Central African Republic	Nigeria	95−90	Mozambique
1982; Details	(Mozambique); Maputo	Angola	round robin	Mozambique	Senegal	round robin	?
1984; Details	(Egypt); Cairo	Egypt	round robin	Angola	Mozambique	round robin	Nigeria
1987; Details	(Nigeria); Abuja	Nigeria	65−62	Angola	Guinea	round robin	Algeria
1988; Details	(Mozambique); Maputo	Angola	round robin	Mozambique	Nigeria		
1990; Details	(Angola); Luanda	Nigeria	round robin	Angola	Cameroon		
1994; Details	(Cameroon); Yaounde	Nigeria	round robin	Angola	Guinea	round robin	Cameroon
1998; Details	(Egypt); Alexandria	Nigeria	round robin	Egypt	Angola	round robin	South Africa
2000; Details	(Guinea); Conakry	Guinea	round robin	Angola	Mali	round robin	Senegal
2002; Details	(Egypt); Cairo	Nigeria	80−60	Angola	Mali	?	Algeria
2006; Details	(South Africa); Durban	Nigeria	69−41	Mali	Angola	74−70	Congo
2008; Details	(Egypt); Alexandria	Egypt	85−84	Angola	Nigeria	79−77	Senegal
2010; Details	(Rwanda); Kigali	Egypt	67−54	Tunisia	Mali	72−56	Mozambique
2012; Details	(Mozambique); Maputo	~~Senegal~~ ^{2012 title}	~~71−62~~	Ivory Coast	Egypt	78–54	Mali
2014; Details	(Madagascar); Antananarivo	Egypt	80−69	Tunisia	Mali	75−65	Angola
2016; Details	(Rwanda); Kigali	Angola	86−82	Egypt	Mali	59–52	Tunisia
2018; Details	(Mali); Bamako	Mali	78−76	Senegal	Egypt	89−78	Angola
2020; Details	(Egypt); Cairo	Mali	82−80	Senegal	Egypt	72−55	Guinea
2022; Details	(Madagascar); Antananarivo	Egypt	81−54	Madagascar	Mali	79−54	Angola
2024; Details	(South Africa); Pretoria	Mali	60−51	Cameroon	Senegal	72−71	Morocco
2026; Details	(Ivory Coast); Abidjan	Ivory Coast	73–51	Senegal	Cameroon	73–69	Mali
2028; Details	(N/A); TBD		−			−	

^2012 title The Senegalese Basketball Federation relinquished the 2012 title due to age fraud by some of its players.

== Medal table ==
Rank	Nation	Gold	Silver	Bronze	Total
1	Egypt	6	2	3	11
2	Nigeria	6	0	3	9
3	Angola	4	7	2	13
4	Mali	3	1	6	10
5	Ivory Coast	1	1	0	2
6	Guinea	1	0	2	3
7	Senegal	0	3	2	5
8	Mozambique	0	2	1	3
8	Tunisia	0	2	1	3
10	Central African Republic	0	2	0	2
11	Cameroon	0	1	2	3
12	Madagascar	0	1	0	1
Totals (12 entries)		21	22	22	65

== Participation details ==
=== Tournaments 1977–2012 ===
Team	(Egypt) 1977	(Angola) 1980	(Mozambique) 1982	(Egypt) 1984	(Nigeria) 1987	(Mozambique) 1988	(Angola) 1990	(Cameroon) 1994	(Egypt) 1998	(Guinea) 2000	(Egypt) 2002	(South Africa) 2006	(Egypt) 2008	(Rwanda) 2010	(Mozambique) 2012
Algeria											4th		7th	8th	
Angola		1st	1st	2nd	2nd	1st	2nd	2nd	3rd	2nd	2nd	3rd	2nd	7th	5th
Cameroon							3rd	4th							
Central African Republic	2nd	2nd						5th					9th		
Congo												4th	11th		
DR Congo														10th	
Egypt	1st	5th		1st					2nd		5-6		1st	1st	3rd
Equatorial Guinea		8th													
Gabon								6th						5th	10th
Ghana															8th
Guinea					3rd			3rd		1st		5th			
Ivory Coast											5-6	7th	6th	11th	2nd
Kenya												9th	12th		
Libya		6th													
Madagascar											7-9				
Mali								7th		3rd	3rd	2nd	5th	3rd	4th
Morocco									6th				8th		9th
Mozambique		4th	2nd	3rd		2nd						8th	10th	4th	7th
Nigeria		3rd			1st	3rd	1st	1st	1st		1st	1st	3rd	9th	
Rwanda														6th	11th
Senegal			3rd							4th	7-9		4th		1st
South Africa									4th		7-9	6th			
Togo		7th													
Tunisia	3rd								5th					2nd	6th
Total	?	8	?	?	?	?	?	7	6	4	9	9	12	11	11

=== Tournaments 2014–present ===
Team	(Madagascar) 2014	(Rwanda) 2016	(Mali) 2018	(Egypt) 2020	(Madagascar) 2022	(South Africa) 2024	(Ivory Coast) 2026	(N/A) 2028	Total
Algeria		7th	11th		7th				6
Angola	4th	1st	4th		4th	6th			19
Benin	8th	11th			8th				3
Cameroon						2nd	3rd	Q	5
Central African Republic									4
Chad							8th		1
Congo									2
DR Congo		6th	5th						3
Egypt	1st	2nd	3rd	3rd	1st	5th	6th		15
Equatorial Guinea									1
Gabon	9th	10th					12th		6
Ghana									1
Guinea			9th	4th	6th				7
Ivory Coast	6th	8th				9th	1st	Q	10
Kenya									2
Libya			8th						2
Madagascar	5th				2nd		7th		4
Mali	3rd	3rd	1st	1st	3rd	1st	4th	Q	12
Morocco						4th	11th		5
Mozambique	7th								9
Nigeria						7th	9th		12
Rwanda		5th	6th		9th	8th	10th		7
Senegal			2nd	2nd	5th	3rd	2nd	Q	11
South Africa						10th			4
Togo									1
Tunisia	2nd	4th	7th				5th		8
Uganda		9th	10th			12th			3
Zambia						11th			1
Total	9	11	11	4	9	12	12	#	

== MVP Awards ==
Year	MVP Award winner
1998	(Ivory Coast) Michel Lasme
2006	(Mali) Waly Coulibaly
2008	(Egypt) Amr Gendy
2010	(Egypt) Aly Mohamed Ahmed
2012	(Egypt) Ehab Amin
2014	(Angola) Gerson Domingos
2016	(Angola) Sílvio Sousa
2018	(Mali) Siriman Kanouté
2020	(Mali) Bourama Coulibaly
2022	(Madagascar) Mathias M'Madi
2024	(Mali) Youssouf Traore
2026	(Ivory Coast) Nathan Djako

== U19 World Cup record ==
Team	(Brazil) 1979	(Spain) 1983	(Italy) 1987	(Canada) 1991	(Greece) 1995	(Portugal) 1999	(Greece) 2003	(Serbia) 2007	(New Zealand) 2009	(Latvia) 2011	(Czech Republic) 2013	(Greece) 2015	(Egypt) 2017	(Greece) 2019	(Latvia) 2021	(Hungary) 2023	(Switzerland) 2025	(Czech Republic) 2027	(Indonesia) 2029	Total
Angola		13th		13th	14th		13th		14th				13th							6
Cameroon																	14th			1
Egypt	12th					13th			11th	12th		11th	12th			13th				7
Ivory Coast											15th							Q		2
Madagascar																14th				1
Mali								15th					16th	2nd	13th		11th			5
Nigeria			12th	15th	11th	11th	11th	13th												6
Senegal											16th			15th	7th			Q		4
Tunisia										16th		16th								2
Total	1	1	1	2	2	2	2	2	2	2	2	2	3	2	2	2	2	2	2	

== Top Ten FIBA Africa boys' teams ==
Updated as of 13 December 2025.

Rank	Change	Team	Points
17	▲1	Mali	552.2
23	▲27	Ivory Coast ^{C}	503.6
25	Same position	Egypt	494.3
26	▼5	Guinea	488.7
27	▲7	Cameroon	481.9
34	▲3	Angola	383.9
35	▼5	Madagascar	382.8
36	▼16	Senegal	379
48	Same position	Morocco	307
51	▲1	Nigeria	288.9

^{C} Current U18 Africa champions

== See also ==
- FIBA AfroBasket
- FIBA U16 AfroBasket
- FIBA U20 AfroBasket
