= DR Congo men's national under-18 basketball team =

Democratic Republic of the Congo
- Joined FIBA: 1963
- FIBA zone: FIBA Africa
- National federation: Febaco

U19 World Cup
- Appearances: None

U18 AfroBasket
- Appearances: 3
- Medals: None
| Home | Away |

The Democratic Republic of the Congo men's national under-18 basketball team (French: Équipe nationale masculine de basket-ball des moins de 16 ans de la République démocratique du Congo) is a national basketball team of the Democratic Republic of the Congo, administered by the Basketball Federation of Democratic Republic of Congo (French: République démocratique du Congo Fédération de basket-ball). It represents the country in international under-18 men's basketball competitions.

== FIBA U18 AfroBasket participations ==
| Year | Result |
|---|---|
| 2010 | 10th |
| 2016 | 6th |
| 2018 | 5th |

== See also ==
- DR Congo men's national basketball team
- DR Congo men's national under-16 basketball team
- DR Congo women's national under-19 basketball team
