= Libya men's national under-18 basketball team =

Libya
- FIBA zone: FIBA Africa
- National federation: Libyan Arab Basketball Federation

U19 World Cup
- Appearances: None

U18 AfroBasket
- Appearances: 2 (1980, 2018)
- Medals: None

The Libya men's national under-18 basketball team is a national basketball team of Libya, administered by the Libyan Arab Basketball Federation. It represents the country in international under-18 men's basketball competitions.

== FIBA U18 AfroBasket participations ==
Year	Result
1980	6th
2018	8th

== See also ==
- Libya men's national basketball team
