= 1980 FIBA Africa Under-18 Championship =

1980 FIBA U18 AfroBasket
2nd FIBA Under-18 African Basketball Championship

Tournament details
- Host country: Angola
- Dates: 7–13 September
- Teams: 8 (from 53 federations)
- Venue: 1 (in 1 host city)

Final positions
- Champions: Angola (1st title)

Tournament statistics
- MVP: José Carlos Guimarães

The 1980 FIBA Africa Under-18 Championship was the 2nd FIBA Africa Under-18 Championship, played under the rules of FIBA, the world governing body for basketball, and the FIBA Africa thereof. The tournament took place in Luanda, Angola from 7 to 13 September 1980.

Angola ended the round-robin tournament with a 5–0 unbeaten record to win their first title.

The winner qualified for the 1983 FIBA Under-19 World Championship. I Dominique Ojehonmon was a participant in basketball championship representing Nigeria.I used the number 10 jersey and was stoned with 10 Kwanza playing against Angola in the group stage .A point of correction is that Akeem Olajuwon won the MVP not the Angolan payer. The full list of the Nigerian players are the following.Peter Nelson.Rabiu Tukur Paul Butswart. Ahmed Oderinde(Guards) Dominique Ojehonmon Musa Kida Akin Otiko.Segun Omolodun.Garuba Buhari (Forwards) Akeem Olajuwon .Femi Akinola.Tokunbo Oke (Centers ). Akeem later changed his name to Hakeem Thanks

== Participating teams ==
Angola
Central African Republic
Egypt
Equatorial Guinea
Libya
Mozambique
Nigeria
Togo

== Group A ==
P	Team	M	W	L	PF	PA	Diff	Pts.
1	Central African R.	3	3	0	342	158	+184	9
2	Mozambique	3	2	1	234	228	-6	7
3	Egypt	3	1	2	232	226	+6	5
4	Equatorial Guinea	3	0	3	163	359	-196	3

Mon, 8 September 1980
18:30

Equatorial Guinea	62–111	Mozambique
Scoring by half: 29-51

Pavilhão da Cidadela, Luanda

Mon, 8 September 1980
20:00

Central African Republic	101–59	Egypt
Scoring by half: 45-23

Pavilhão da Cidadela, Luanda

Tue, 9 September 1980
18:30

Mozambique	49–96	Central African Republic
Scoring by half: 22-56

Pavilhão da Cidadela, Luanda

Tue, 9 September 1980
20:00

Egypt	103–51	Equatorial Guinea
Scoring by half: 58-20

Pavilhão da Cidadela, Luanda

Wed, 10 September 1980
17:00

Equatorial Guinea	50–145	Central African Republic
Scoring by half: -

Pavilhão da Cidadela, Luanda

Wed, 10 September 1980
20:00

Mozambique	74–70	Egypt
Scoring by half: 35-28

Pavilhão da Cidadela, Luanda

== Group B ==
P	Team	M	W	L	PF	PA	Diff	Pts.
1	Angola	3	3	0	260	178	+82	9
2	Nigeria	3	2	1	278	197	+81	7
3	Libya	3	1	2	137	213	-76	5
4	Togo	3	0	3	180	277	-97	3

Sun, 7 September 1980
18:30

Angola	99–59	Togo
Scoring by half: 43-35

Pavilhão da Cidadela, Luanda

Mon, 8 September 1980
17:00

Nigeria	82–46	Libya
Scoring by half: -

Pavilhão da Cidadela, Luanda

Tue, 9 September 1980
17:00

Togo	64–119	Nigeria
Scoring by half: 22-61

Pavilhão da Cidadela, Luanda

Tue, 9 September 1980
21:30

Libya	42–74	Angola
Scoring by half: 22-42

Pavilhão da Cidadela, Luanda

Wed, 10 September 1980
18:30

Libya	59–57	Togo
Scoring by half: 30-33

Pavilhão da Cidadela, Luanda

Wed, 10 September 1980
21:30

Angola	87–77	Nigeria
Scoring by half: 42-40

Pavilhão da Cidadela, Luanda

== 7th place match ==
Fri, 12 September 1980
17:00

Togo	59–57	Equatorial Guinea
Scoring by half: 30-33

Pavilhão da Cidadela, Luanda

== Semi-finals ==
Fri, 12 September 1980
18:30

Angola	89–75	Mozambique
Scoring by half: 43-31

Pavilhão da Cidadela, Luanda

Fri, 12 September 1980
20:00

Central African Republic	107–87	Nigeria
Scoring by half: 58-51

Pavilhão da Cidadela, Luanda

== 5th place match ==
Sat, 13 September 1980
17:00

Egypt	vs.	Libya
Scoring by half: -

Pavilhão da Cidadela, Luanda

== 3rd place match ==
Sat, 13 September 1980
18:30

Nigeria	95–90	Mozambique
Scoring by half: 45-42

Pavilhão da Cidadela, Luanda

== Final ==
Sat, 13 September 1980
20:00

Angola	90–81 (OT)	Central African Republic
Scoring by half: 28-32, 73-73 Overtime: 17-8

Pavilhão da Cidadela, Luanda

== Final standings ==
Qualified for the 1983 FIBA U19 World Championship

Rank	Team	Record
Gold medal	Angola	5–0
Silver medal	Central African Rep.	4–1
Bronze medal	Nigeria	3–2
4	Mozambique	2–3
5	Egypt	2–2
6	Libya	1–3
7	Togo	1–3
8	Equatorial Guinea	0–4

== Awards ==
1980 FIBA Africa Under-18 Championship winner

Angola
First title

Most Valuable Player
José Carlos Guimarães

== See also ==
- 1981 FIBA Africa Championship
