= Rwanda men's national under-18 basketball team =

Rwanda
- FIBA zone: FIBA Africa
- National federation: Fédération Rwandaise de Basketball Amateur

U19 World Cup
- Appearances: None

U18 AfroBasket
- Appearances: 6
- Medals: None

The Rwanda men's national under-18 basketball team is a national basketball team of Rwanda, administered by the Fédération Rwandaise de Basketball Amateur. It represents the country in men's international under-18 basketball competitions.

== FIBA U18 AfroBasket participations ==
Year	Result
2010	6th
2012	11th
2016	5th
2018	6th
2022	9th
2024	8th
2026	10th

== See also ==
- Rwanda men's national basketball team
- Rwanda men's national under-16 basketball team
- Rwanda women's national under-18 basketball team
