= Uganda men's national under-18 basketball team =

Uganda
- FIBA zone: FIBA Africa
- National federation: Federation of Uganda Basketball Association

U19 World Cup
- Appearances: None

U18 AfroBasket
- Appearances: 3
- Medals: None

The Uganda men's national under-18 basketball team also known as Junior Silverbacks is a national basketball team of Uganda, administered by the Federation of Uganda Basketball Association. It represents the country in international under-18 men's basketball competitions.

== FIBA U18 AfroBasket participations ==
Year	Result
2016	9th
2018	10th
2024	12th

== See also ==
- Uganda men's national basketball team
- Uganda men's national under-16 basketball team
- Uganda women's national under-18 basketball team
