= Mali men's national under-18 and under-19 basketball team =

Mali
- FIBA ranking: 18 (As of December 2024)
- Joined FIBA: 1961
- FIBA zone: FIBA Africa
- National federation: Fédération Malienne de Basketball

U19 World Cup
- Appearances: 5
- Medals: (silver) Silver: 1 (2019)

U18 AfroBasket
- Appearances: 13
- Medals: (gold) Gold: 3 (2018, 2020, 2024); (silver) Silver: 1 (2006); (bronze) Bronze: 6 (2000, 2002, 2010, 2014, 2016, 2022)
Home	Away

The Mali men's national under-18 and under-19 basketball team is the representative for Mali in international basketball competitions, and it is organized and run by the Fédération Malienne de Basketball. The Mali men's national under-18 basketball team represents Mali at the FIBA U18 AfroBasket, where they have a chance to qualify for the FIBA Under-19 Basketball World Cup.

At the 2019 FIBA Under-19 Basketball World Cup, Mali broke every record of African basketball teams as the team finished runner-up only to the favorites United States.

== Tournament record ==
=== U19 World Cup ===
Year	Pos.	GP	W	L	Ref.
1979–2003	Did not qualify				
(Serbia) 2007	15th	5	1	4	
(New Zealand) 2009	Did not qualify				
(Latvia) 2011	Did not qualify				
(Czech Republic) 2013	Did not qualify				
(Greece) 2015	Did not qualify				
(Egypt) 2017	16th	7	0	7	
(Greece) 2019	2nd	7	5	2	
(Latvia) 2021	13th	7	2	5	
(Hungary) 2023	Did not qualify				
(Switzerland) 2025	11th	7	3	4	
(Czech Republic) 2027	To be determined				
(Indonesia) 2029	To be determined				
Total	5/19	33	11	22	

=== U18 AfroBasket ===
Year	Pos.	GP	W	L	Ref.
1977–1990	Did not participate				
(Cameroon) 1994	7th	6	0	6	
(Egypt) 1998	Did not qualify				
(Guinea) 2000	3rd (bronze)	6	3	3	
(Egypt) 2002	3rd (bronze)	6	5	1	
(South Africa) 2006	2nd (silver)	5	4	1	
(Egypt) 2008	5th	8	6	2	
(Rwanda) 2010	3rd (bronze)	6	5	1	
(Mozambique) 2012	4th	7	4	3	
(Madagascar) 2014	3rd (bronze)	6	4	2	
(Rwanda) 2016	3rd (bronze)	7	6	1	
(Mali) 2018	1st (gold)	8	8	0	
(Egypt) 2020	1st (gold)	5	2	3	
(Madagascar) 2022	3rd (bronze)	7	5	2	
(South Africa) 2024	1st (gold)	6	6	0	
Total	13/21	83	58	25	

== Current squad ==
Team at the 2026 FIBA U18 AfroBasket:

Mali roster
Players
Coaches

Pos.	No.	Name	Age – Date of birth	Height	Club
C	2	Sambala Mady Issa Sissoko	18 – 18 June 2008	1.86 m (6 ft 1 in)
SG	4	Mohamed Keita	16 – 31 March 2010	2.00 m (6 ft 7 in)	CRB	(Mali)
PG	8	Ouwa Camara	18 – 1 March 2008	2.00 m (6 ft 7 in)
F	9	Abdoul Karim Diallo	16 – 9 August 2009	2.09 m (6 ft 10 in)
PG	10	Sekou Ousmane Bagayoko	18 – 28 April 2008	1.90 m (6 ft 3 in)	Anthem Prep	(United States)
G	12	Mouhamed Diamel Sanogo	16 – 24 August 2009	2.07 m (6 ft 9 in)
SF	14	N'Dji Ibourahima Coulibaly	15 – 16 October 2010	2.04 m (6 ft 8 in)
F	32	Mahamadou Sylla	17 – 10 September 2008	2.03 m (6 ft 8 in)	CMK	(Mali)
PF	34	Alassane Doucoure	18 – 4 July 2008	2.05 m (6 ft 9 in)
PG	60	Aboubacar Sidiki Konate	17 – 10 September 2008	1.97 m (6 ft 6 in)
G	75	Mamadou Niama Sissoko	18 – 3 January 2008	1.92 m (6 ft 4 in)
SF	78	Boubacar-Sidy Traore	18 – 30 July 2008	1.98 m (6 ft 6 in)

Head coach

- (Mali) Moussa Cissé

Assistant coach(es)

- (Mali) Kanoute Sega

Legend

- Club – describes current club
- Age – describes age
  on 5 August 2026

== See also ==
- Mali men's national basketball team
- Mali men's national under-17 basketball team
- Mali women's national under-19 basketball team
