= Algeria men's national under-18 basketball team =

Algeria
- Joined FIBA: 1963
- FIBA zone: FIBA Africa
- National federation: Fédération Algérienne de Basket-Ball

U19 World Cup
- Appearances: None

U18 AfroBasket
- Appearances: 6
- Medals: None

The Algeria men's national under-18 basketball team is a national basketball team of Algeria, administered by the Algerian Basketball Federation. It represents the country in international under-18 men's basketball competitions.

== FIBA U18 AfroBasket participations ==
Year	Result
2002	4th
2008	7th
2010	8th
2016	7th
2018	11th
2022	7th

== See also ==
- Algeria men's national basketball team
- Algeria men's national under-16 basketball team
- Algeria women's national under-18 basketball team
