= 2010 FIBA Africa Under-18 Championship =

2010 FIBA U18 AfroBasket
14th FIBA Under-18 African Basketball Championship

Tournament details
- Host country: Rwanda
- Dates: October 8–17
- Teams: 11
- Venue: 1 (in 1 host city)

Final positions
- Champions: Egypt (4th title)

Tournament statistics
- MVP: (Egypt) Aly Mohamed Ahmed
- Top scorer: (Rwanda) Lionel Hakizimana

Official website
- 2010 FIBA Africa Under-18 Championship

The 2010 FIBA Africa Under-18 Championship for Men (alternatively the Afrobasket U18) was the 14th FIBA Africa Under-18 Championship for Men, organized by FIBA Africa and played under the auspices of the Fédération Internationale de Basketball, the basketball sport governing body and the African zone thereof. The tournament was held from October 8–17 in Rwanda and won by Egypt.

The tournament qualified both the winner and the runner-up for the 2011 Under-19 World Cup.

== Format ==
- The 11 teams were divided into two groups (Groups A+B) for the preliminary round.
- Round robin for the preliminary round; the top four teams advanced to the quarterfinals.
- From there on a knockout system was used until the final.

== Draw ==
Group A	Group B
Algeria; Congo; Mali; Mozambique; Nigeria; Rwanda	Angola; Ivory Coast; Egypt; Gabon; Tunisia

== Preliminary round ==
=== Group A ===
Qualified for the Quarter-finals
Points forfeited due to age fraud

Team	Pld	W	L	PF	PA	PD	Pts
Mali	5	5	0	278	177	+101	10
Mozambique	5	3	2	233	218	+15	8
Rwanda	5	2	3	283	275	+8	6
Algeria	5	2	3	305	315	-10	7
Congo	5	2	3	283	375	-92	4
Nigeria	5	0	5	0	80	-80	5

8 October 2010
11:00

Mozambique	62–80	Nigeria

Amahoro Stadium, Kigali

8 October 2010
13:00

Congo	72–67	Mali

Amahoro Stadium, Kigali

8 October 2010
18:30

Rwanda	66–63	Algeria

Amahoro Stadium, Kigali

9 October 2010
12:00

Mozambique	50–81	Congo

Amahoro Stadium, Kigali

9 October 2010
16:00

Algeria	62–94	Mali

Amahoro Stadium, Kigali

9 October 2010
18:00

Report

Nigeria	83–65	Rwanda

Amahoro Stadium, Kigali

10 October 2010
12:00

Report

Nigeria	67–79	Congo

Amahoro Stadium, Kigali

10 October 2010
16:00

Report

Algeria	73–65	Mozambique

Amahoro Stadium, Kigali

10 October 2010
18:00

Report

Rwanda	57–68	Mali

Amahoro Stadium, Kigali

12 October 2010
14:30

Report

Mali	76–58	Mozambique

Amahoro Stadium, Kigali

12 October 2010
18:00

Report

Rwanda	71–74	Congo

Amahoro Stadium, Kigali

12 October 2010
20:00

Report

Nigeria	83–70	Algeria

Amahoro Stadium, Kigali

13 October 2010
16:30

Report

Congo	90–87	Algeria

Amahoro Stadium, Kigali

13 October 2010
18:00

Report

Mozambique	70–69	Rwanda

Amahoro Stadium, Kigali

13 October 2010
20:00

Report

Mali	48–53	Nigeria

Amahoro Stadium, Kigali

=== Group B ===
Team	Pld	W	L	PF	PA	PD	Pts
Egypt	4	4	0	366	213	+153	8
Tunisia	4	3	1	287	243	+44	7
Gabon	4	2	2	255	241	+14	6
Angola	4	1	3	210	261	-51	5
Ivory Coast	4	0	4	174	334	-170	4

8 October 2010
15:00

Egypt	76–62	Gabon

Amahoro Stadium, Kigali

8 October 2010
20:30

Ivory Coast	41–61	Angola

Amahoro Stadium, Kigali

9 October 2010
14:00

Gabon	60–55	Angola

Amahoro Stadium, Kigali

9 October 2010
20:00

Tunisia	62–98	Egypt

Amahoro Stadium, Kigali

10 October 2010
14:00

Tunisia	88–45	Ivory Coast

Amahoro Stadium, Kigali

10 October 2010
20:00

Egypt	87–47	Angola

Amahoro Stadium, Kigali

12 October 2010
12:00

Egypt	105–42	Ivory Coast

Amahoro Stadium, Kigali

12 October 2010
16:30

Tunisia	64–53	Gabon

Amahoro Stadium, Kigali

13 October 2010
14:30

Ivory Coast	46–80	Gabon

Amahoro Stadium, Kigali

13 October 2010
16:00

Angola	47–73	Tunisia

Amahoro Stadium, Kigali

== Knockout stage ==
Championship bracket

Quarter-finals
Fri 15 Oct 2010 – 14:00
Algeria	66
Egypt	87
Fri 15 Oct 2010 – 16:00
Gabon	58
Mozambique	67
Fri 15 Oct 2010 – 18:00
Rwanda	47
Tunisia	86
Fri 15 Oct 2010 – 20:00
Angola	40
Mali	65

Semi-finals
Sat 16 Oct 2010 – 20:00
Egypt	82
Mozambique	40
Sat 16 Oct 2010 – 18:00
Mali	58
Tunisia	69

Final
Sun 17 Oct 2010 – 18:00
Egypt	67
Tunisia	54
Third place
Sun 17 Oct 2010 – 15:30
Mozambique	56
Mali	72

5-8th bracket

5th-8th place
Sat 16 Oct 2010 – 16:00
Algeria	61
Gabon	75
Sat 16 Oct 2010 – 14:00
Rwanda	68
Angola	44

Fifth place
Sun 17 Oct 2010 – 13:30
Gabon	73
Rwanda	71
Seventh place
Sun 17 Oct 2010 – 11:30
Algeria	59
Angola	65

=== 9th place ===
15 October 2010
12:00

Nigeria	97–59	Ivory Coast

Amahoro Stadium, Kigali

16 October 2010
12:00

Congo	53–76	Nigeria

Amahoro Stadium, Kigali

=== Quarterfinals ===
15 October 2010
14:00

Algeria	66–87	Egypt

Amahoro Stadium, Kigali

15 October 2010
16:00

Gabon	58–67	Mozambique

Amahoro Stadium, Kigali

15 October 2010
18:00

Rwanda	47–86	Tunisia

Amahoro Stadium, Kigali

15 October 2010
20:00

Angola	40–65	Mali

Amahoro Stadium, Kigali

=== Classification 5–8 ===
16 October 2010
14:00

Angola	44–68	Rwanda

Amahoro Stadium, Kigali

16 October 2010
16:00

Algeria	61–75	Gabon

Amahoro Stadium, Kigali

=== Semifinals ===
16 October 2010
18:00

Mali	58–69	Tunisia

Amahoro Stadium, Kigali

16 October 2010
20:00

Egypt	82–40	Mozambique

Amahoro Stadium, Kigali

=== Seventh place game ===
17 October 2010
11:30

Angola	65–59	Algeria

Amahoro Stadium, Kigali

=== Fifth place game ===
17 October 2010
13:30

Rwanda	71–73	Gabon

Amahoro Stadium, Kigali

=== Bronze medal game ===
17 October 2010
15:30

Mali	72–56	Mozambique

Amahoro Stadium, Kigali

=== Gold medal game ===
17 October 2010
18:00

Tunisia	54–67	Egypt
Scoring by quarter: 17-15, 9-14, 17-13, 11-25
Pts: n/a		Pts: Mohammad 30

Amahoro Stadium, Kigali

== Final standings ==
Qualified for the 2011 FIBA Under-19 World Championship

Rank	Team	Record
Gold medal	Egypt	6–1
Silver medal	Tunisia	6–1
Bronze medal	Mali	5–1
4.	Mozambique	3–3
5.	Gabon	2–5
6.	Rwanda	2–5
7.	Angola	2–5
8.	Algeria	1–5
9.	Nigeria	0–4
10.	Congo	0–4
11.	Ivory Coast	0–4

== Awards ==
2010 FIBA Africa Under-18 Championship winner

Egypt
Fourth title

Most Valuable Player
(Egypt) Aly Mohamed Ahmed

== See also ==
- 2009 FIBA Africa Under-16 Championship
