= Silvio De Sousa =

Angolan basketball player

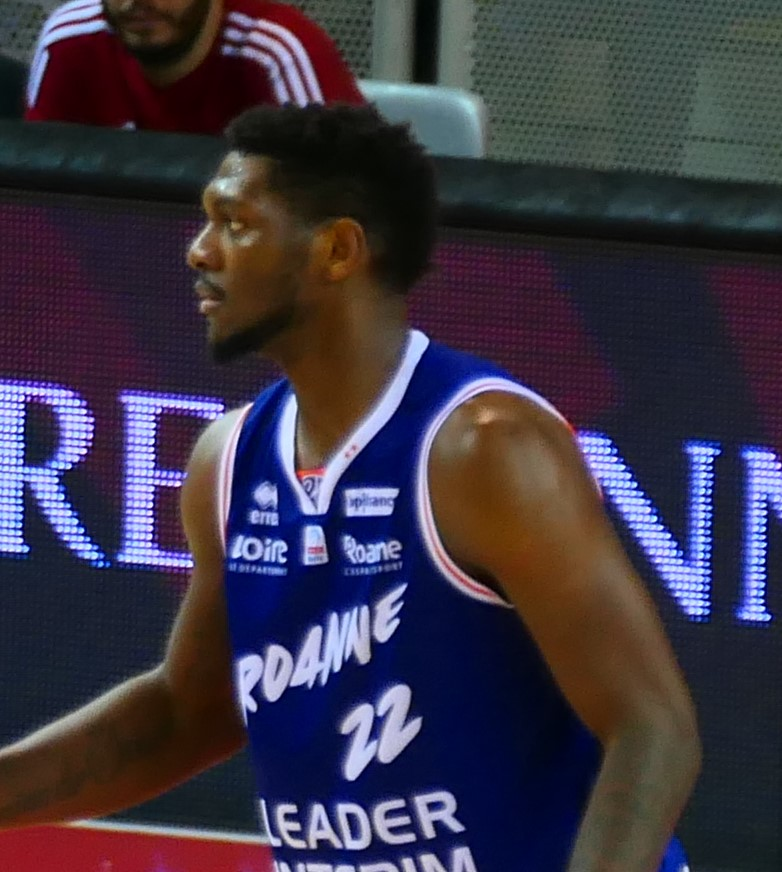
- De Sousa in January 2023 with Chorale Roanne

No. 29 – Maroussi
- Position: Center / power forward
- League: GBL

Personal information
- Born: 7 October 1998 (age 28) Luanda, Angola
- Listed height: 2.06 m (6 ft 9 in)
- Listed weight: 113 kg (249 lb)

Career information
- High school: Montverde Academy (Montverde, Florida); IMG Academy (Bradenton, Florida)
- College: Kansas (2017–2020); Chattanooga (2021–2022)
- NBA draft: 2022: undrafted
- Playing career: 2022–present

Career history
- 2022–2023: Chorale Roanne
- 2023–2024: Aris Thessaloniki
- 2024–2025: Ironi Kiryat Ata
- 2025–2026: San Pablo Burgos
- 2026–present: Maroussi

Career highlights
- FIBA Africa Under-18 Championship MVP (2016)
Medals
Men's basketball
Representing Angola
AfroBasket
Gold medal – first place	2025 Angola
FIBA Africa Under-18 Championship
Gold medal – first place	2016 Rwanda	Team
FIBA Africa Under-16 Championship
Gold medal – first place	2013 Madagascar	Team

Silvio De Sousa (born 7 October 1998) is an Angolan professional basketball player for Maroussi of the Greek Basketball League (GBL). He previously played college basketball for the Kansas Jayhawks. A native of Luanda, Angola, De Sousa competed with Montverde Academy and then IMG Academy in high school. He has played for the Angolan national team on multiple occasions at the junior level.

== Early life ==
De Sousa was born in Luanda, Angola to Jean Conceição and Janina De Sousa and has three younger sisters: Aline, Luisa, and Alicia. In his childhood, he played soccer and basketball, but he decided to focus on the latter sport at age 10.

== High school career ==
Shortly before his freshman year of high school, De Sousa moved to the United States. He first attended Montverde Academy in Montverde, Florida. Under head coach Kevin Boyle, he helped the team remain ranked top-5 in the country and was considered its best prospect. After having to share playing time with top prospects and forwards Simisola Shittu and E. J. Montgomery, he chose to leave the program after his sophomore season.

For his junior year, De Sousa transferred to IMG Academy in Bradenton, Florida, as decided by his parents. Although IMG also had touted big men, Isaiah Stokes and Emmitt Williams, his decision ultimately gave him more playing time than at Montverde. In the summer of 2016, he also competed with the Under Armour Association team Florida Vipers, averaging 20.5 points and 8.2 rebounds per game.

In August of his senior year, De Sousa committed to Kansas and reclassified from the recruiting class of 2018 to 2017 while exploring the chance to graduate early from IMG Academy and join the Jayhawks in time for the second semester of the 2017–18 NCAA season. He successfully completed his academic requirements at IMG Academy and graduated early, in December 2017.

== College career ==
=== Freshman year ===
On 13 January 2018 the NCAA ruled De Sousa immediately eligible to play for the 2017–18 Kansas Jayhawks. In his freshman season he averaged 8.8 minutes, four points, and 3.7 rebounds per game over 20 games, helping the Jayhawks to their 14th consecutive Big 12 Conference Championship, Big 12 tournament championship, and Final Four appearance in the NCAA tournament.

=== Sophomore year ===
During the October 2018 college basketball corruption trial of two Adidas officials and an aspiring NBA agent, testimony was given by TJ Gassnola, a former consultant for Adidas, alleged that De Sousa's guardian, Fenny Falmagne, had accepted $60,000 from an unnamed Maryland booster to steer De Sousa to that program. Gassnola further testified that he gave $2,500 to Falmagne to cover the cost of online courses that De Sousa needed to graduate high school early. He also agreed to pay $20,000 to Falmagne to help release De Sousa from the commitment to the Maryland booster, but that the proposed payment was never made. De Sousa ultimately committed to Kansas, one of the named victims in the federal indictment. Falmagne has vehemently asserted that neither he nor De Sousa accepted any money to steer De Sousa to Kansas, stating that "Coach Self is not about that (paying players). That is one of the things I really appreciate about him. ... That's when we went over there (to visit KU)."

With De Sousa's amateur status now in question, on 24 October 2018 Kansas announced that De Sousa would be held out of competition until an eligibility review was completed. On 1 February 2019, the NCAA ruled him ineligible for the remainder of the 2018–19 season and all of the 2019–20 season. Kansas Athletic Director Jeff Long immediately announced that they will appeal. Head coach Bill Self called the entire process and decision "mean spirited" and "vindictive". On 18 April 2019, Kansas officially filed the appeal with the NCAA on De Sousa's behalf. The following day, he declared for the 2019 NBA draft but also announced he planned to return to Kansas if he won his appeal. On 24 May 2019, the NCAA announced that he had won his appeal and will be eligible to play in the 2019–20 season. The following day, he officially withdrew from the draft.

=== Junior year ===
On 21 January 2020, in a game against Kansas State, De Sousa was dribbling out the ball in an 81–59 game in favor of Kansas when he was stripped by Kansas State player DaJuan Gordon with 3.1 seconds remaining in the game. De Sousa blocked Gordon's dunk attempt as time expired then stood over and taunted him, which sparked a brawl between both teams. De Sousa threw several punches and picked up a chair before he was restrained by assistant coach Jerrance Howard. De Sousa was suspended indefinitely by Kansas for his role in the brawl. The Big 12 announced his suspension will be 12 games, however, Bill Self stated he may continue the suspension beyond the 12 games. He was eligible to return for the Jayhawks’ final regular-season game against Texas Tech on 7 March.

On 16 October 2020, De Sousa announced he was opting out of the 2020–21 season to focus on a personal matter.

=== Graduate ===
On 20 July 2021, De Sousa transferred to Chattanooga for his final year of eligibility.

On 5 August 2021, De Sousa was found not guilty of aggravated battery in a case stemming from 1 January 2020, shortly before the brawl against Kansas State. According to the complaint, De Sousa had been involved in an early morning altercation outside of a bar in Douglas County which resulted in a man losing sight permanently in one of his eyes.

== Professional career ==
On 28 June 2022, De Sousa signed his first professional contract with Chorale Roanne of the LNB Pro A. He averaged 8.9 points and 4.9 rebounds per game with the French club.

On July 5, 2024, he signed with Ironi Kiryat Ata of the Israeli Basketball Premier League.

On August 5, 2025, he signed with San Pablo Burgos of the Spanish Liga ACB.

On June 19, 2026, De Sousa signed with Maroussi of the Greek Basketball League.

== Career statistics ==
Legend
GP	Games played	GS	Games started	MPG	Minutes per game
FG%	Field goal percentage	3P%	3-point field goal percentage	FT%	Free throw percentage
RPG	Rebounds per game	APG	Assists per game	SPG	Steals per game
BPG	Blocks per game	PPG	Points per game	**Bold**	Career high

=== College ===
Year	Team	GP	GS	MPG	FG%	3P%	FT%	RPG	APG	SPG	BPG	PPG
2017–18	Kansas	**20**	0	**8.8**	**.681**	–	**.714**	3.7	.2	.1	.2	4.0
2019–20	Kansas	18	**1**	8.2	.471	**.667**	.520	2.8	.1	.1	.8	2.6
2021–22	Chattanooga	28	**26**	20.0	.579	.263	.648	6.9	**.9**	**.8**	**1**	**11.0**
Career		66	27	13.4	.579	.318	.632	4.8	.5	.7	.4	6.6
