= Mohamed Rassil =

Tunisian basketball player

No. 28 – Étoile Sportive du Sahel
- Position: Forward
- League: Championnat National A

Personal information
- Born: 3 February 1998 (age 28) Nabeul, Tunisia
- Listed height: 6 ft 7 in (2.01 m)

Career information
- Playing career: 2014–present

Career history
- 2014–2018: AS Hammamet
- 2018–2021: ES Sahel
- 2021–2022: US Monastir
- 2022–present: ES Sahel

Career highlights
- BAL champion (2022); Tunisian League champion (2022); Tunisian Cup winner (2022)
Medals
Men's basketball
Representing Tunisia
AfroBasket
Gold medal – first place	2017 Tunisia/Senegal

Mohamed Adam Rassil (born 3 February 1998) is a Tunisian basketball player for ES Sahel and the Tunisian national team. With Tunisia, Rassil won a gold medal at the AfroBasket 2017 tournament.

Since the 2021–22 season, Rassil plays with US Monastir where he was on the roster for the 2022 BAL season, playing in two games. On 28 May 2022, he won the club's first-ever BAL championship with Monastir.

== BAL career statistics ==
Legend
GP	Games played	GS	Games started	MPG	Minutes per game
FG%	Field goal percentage	3P%	3-point field goal percentage	FT%	Free throw percentage
RPG	Rebounds per game	APG	Assists per game	SPG	Steals per game
BPG	Blocks per game	PPG	Points per game	**Bold**	Career high

Year	Team	GP	GS	MPG	FG%	3P%	FT%	RPG	APG	SPG	BPG	PPG
2022†	Monastir	2	0	7.8	.000	.000	.–	3.0	0.5	0.0	0.5	0.0
