= 2000 FIBA Africa Under-18 Championship =

2000 FIBA U18 AfroBasket
10th FIBA Under-18 African Basketball Championship

Tournament details
- Host country: Guinea
- Dates: July 9–15, 2000
- Teams: 4
- Venue(s): 1 (in 1 host city)

Final positions
- Champions: Guinea (1st title)

Official website
- 2000 FIBA Africa Under-18 Championship

The 2000 FIBA Africa Under-18 Championship for Women was the 10th FIBA Africa Under-18 Championship, played under the rules of FIBA, the world governing body for basketball, and the FIBA Africa thereof. The tournament was hosted by Guinea from July 9 to 15, 2000.

Guinea ended the double round-robin tournament with a 5–1 record to win their first title.

== Participating teams ==
Angola
Guinea
Mali
Senegal

== Schedule ==
P	Team	M	W	L	PF	PA	Diff	Pts.
1	Guinea	6	5	1	320	306	+14	11
2	Angola	6	4	2	324	284	+40	10
3	Mali	6	3	3	340	343	-3	9
4	Senegal	6	0	6	263	314	-51	9

July 9, 2000

Angola	52–44	Senegal

Conakry

Guinea	78–63	Mali

Conakry

July 10, 2000

Guinea	44–39	Senegal

Conakry

July 12, 2000

Mali	39–60	Angola

July 11, 2000

Guinea	44–39	Angola

Conakry

Senegal	60–62	Mali

July 13, 2000

Senegal	40–51	Angola

Conakry

Mali	52–56	Guinea

July 14, 2000

Senegal	38–51	Guinea

Conakry

Angola	47–70	Mali

July 15, 2000

Angola	75–47	Guinea

Conakry

Mali	54–42	Senegal

== Final standings ==
Rank	Team	Record
Gold medal	Guinea	5–1
Silver medal	Angola	4–2
Bronze medal	Mali	3–3
4	Senegal	0–6

== Awards ==
2000 FIBA Africa Under-18 Championship winner

Guinea
First title

Most Valuable Player

== See also ==
- 2001 FIBA Africa Championship
