= 2020 FIBA U18 African Championship =

2020 FIBA U18 AfroBasket
19th FIBA Under-18 African Basketball Championship

Tournament details
- Host country: Egypt
- City: Cairo
- Dates: 3−9 December 2020
- Teams: 4 (from 1 confederation)
- Venue(s): 1 (in 1 host city)

Final positions
- Champions: Mali (2nd title)

Official website
- www.fiba.basketball

The 2020 FIBA U18 African Championship was the 19th edition of the FIBA U18 African Championship, an international men's under-18 basketball tournament. It was played in Cairo, Egypt, from 3 to 9 December 2020.

The top two teams qualified for the 2021 FIBA Under-19 Basketball World Cup in Latvia as the FIBA Africa representatives.

== Group phase ==
In the group phase, the teams played a round-robin tournament. All teams advanced to the playoffs.

Pos	Team	Pld	W	L	PF	PA	PD	Pts
1	Egypt (H)	3	3	0	220	186	+34	6
2	Senegal	3	2	1	200	206	−6	5
3	Guinea	3	1	2	176	183	−7	4
4	Mali	3	0	3	199	220	−21	3

Source: FIBA
(H) Hosts

All times are local (Egypt Standard Time – UTC+2).

3 December 2020
20:00

Boxscore

Egypt	68–60	Guinea

Cairo Stadium Indoor Hall 3

4 December 2020
17:30

Boxscore

Mali	78–80	Senegal

Cairo Stadium Indoor Hall 3

5 December 2020
17:30

Boxscore

Guinea	63–60	Mali

Cairo Stadium Indoor Hall 3

5 December 2020
20:00

Boxscore

Senegal	65–75	Egypt

Cairo Stadium Indoor Hall 3

6 December 2020
17:30

Boxscore

Senegal	55–53	Guinea

Cairo Stadium Indoor Hall 3

6 December 2020
20:00

Boxscore

Egypt	77–61	Mali

Cairo Stadium Indoor Hall 3

== Playoffs ==
=== Bracket ===
Semifinals
A2	Senegal	52
A3	Guinea	39
A1	Egypt	70
A4	Mali	79

Final
Senegal	80
Mali	82
3rd place game
Guinea	55
Egypt	72

=== Semifinals ===
8 December 2020
17:30

Boxscore

Senegal	52–39	Guinea

Cairo Stadium Indoor Hall 3

8 December 2020
20:00

Boxscore

Egypt	70–79	Mali

Cairo Stadium Indoor Hall 3

=== 3rd place game ===
9 December 2020
14:00

Boxscore

Guinea	55–72	Egypt

Cairo Stadium Indoor Hall 3

=== Final ===
9 December 2020
20:00

Boxscore

Senegal	80–82	Mali

Cairo Stadium Indoor Hall 3

== Final standings ==
Rank	Team
1st place, gold medalist(s)	Mali
2nd place, silver medalist(s)	Senegal
3rd place, bronze medalist(s)	Egypt
4	Guinea

Qualified for the 2021 FIBA Under-19 Basketball World Cup
