= Ivory Coast men's national under-19 basketball team =

Ivory Coast
- FIBA zone: FIBA Africa
- National federation: Fédération Ivoirienne de Basket-Ball

U19 World Cup
- Appearances: 2
- Medals: None

U18 AfroBasket
- Appearances: 8
- Medals: (gold) Gold: 1 (2026); (silver) Silver: 1 (2012)

The Ivory Coast men's national under-18 and under-19 basketball team is a national basketball team of the Ivory Coast, governed by the Fédération Ivoirienne de Basket-Ball. It represents the country in international under-18 and under-19 men's basketball competitions.

== FIBA U18 AfroBasket participations ==
Year	Result
2006	7th
2008	6th
2010	11th
2012	2nd place, silver medalist(s)
2014	6th
2016	8th
2024	9th
2026	1st place, gold medalist(s)

== FIBA Under-19 Basketball World Cup participations ==
Year	Result
2013	15th
2027	Qualified

== See also ==
- Ivory Coast men's national basketball team
- Ivory Coast men's national under-16 basketball team
- Ivory Coast women's national under-19 basketball team
