= Greece men's national under-19 basketball team =

Greece
- Joined FIBA: 1932
- FIBA zone: FIBA Europe
- Coach: Giannis Kastritis

U19 World Cup
- Appearances: 6
- Medals: Gold: 1 (1995); Silver: 1 (2009); Bronze: 1 (2003)
Home	Away

The Greece men's national under-19 basketball team (Greek youth national basketball team), (Greek: Εθνική ομάδα καλαθοσφαίρισης Εφήβων Ελλάδας) is the representative for Greece in international youth men's basketball competitions, and it is organized and run by the Hellenic Basketball Federation. The Greek men's under-19 national basketball team represents Greece at the FIBA Under-19 Basketball World Cup.

== FIBA Under-19 World Cup ==
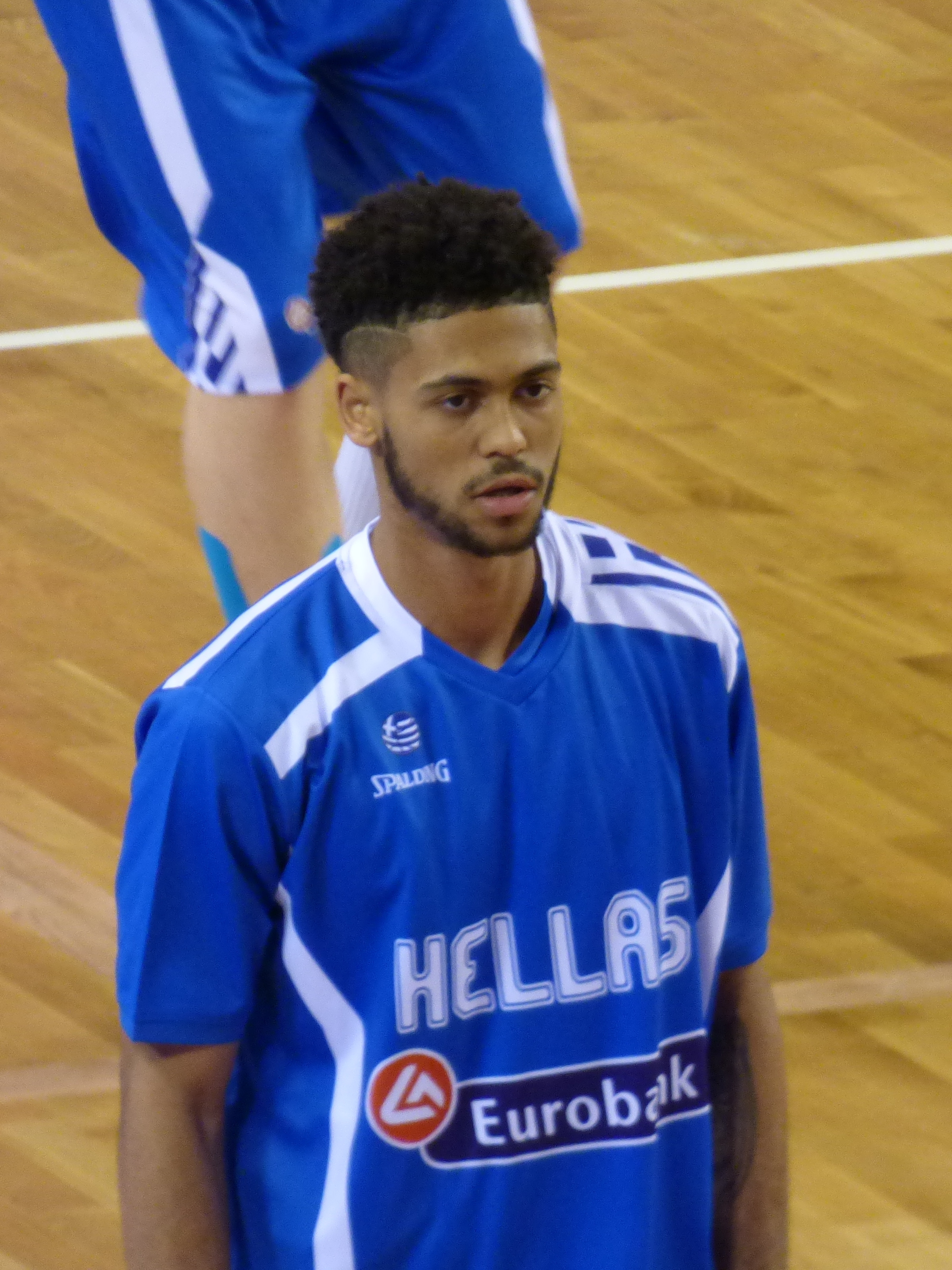
Tyler Dorsey, with the Greek Under-19 national team, during the 2015 FIBA Under-19 World Cup.

Year	Position
(Brazil) 1979	Did not qualify
(Spain) 1983	Did not participate
(Italy) 1987	Did not qualify
(Canada) 1991	Did not qualify
(Greece) 1995	1st place, gold medalist(s)
(Portugal) 1999	7th
(Greece) 2003	Bronze medal
(Serbia) 2007	Did not qualify
(New Zealand) 2009	2nd place, silver medalist(s)
(Latvia) 2011	Did not qualify
(Czech Republic) 2013	Did not qualify
(Greece) 2015	4th
(Egypt) 2017	Did not qualify
(Greece) 2019	10th
(Latvia) 2021	Did not qualify
(Hungary) 2023	Did not qualify
(Switzerland) 2025	Did not qualify
(Czech Republic) 2027	Did not qualify
(Indonesia) 2029	To be determined
Total	6/19

== Team ==
Roster for the 2019 FIBA Under-19 Basketball World Cup

Greece U19 national basketball team roster
Players
Coaches

Pos.	No.	Name	Age – Date of birth	Height	Club	Ctr.
PF	1	Aristotelis Sotiriou	17 – 13 July 2001	2.03 m (6 ft 8 in)	Panathinaikos	(Greece)
PG	4	Zois Karampelas	18 – 27 April 2001	1.85 m (6 ft 1 in)	Peristeri	(Greece)
PG	5	Iosif Koloveros	16 – 28 August 2002	1.85 m (6 ft 1 in)	Olympiacos	(Greece)
G/F	6	Nikos Chougkaz	18 – 4 October 2000	2.08 m (6 ft 10 in)	PAOK Tessaloniki	(Greece)
PF	7	Fotis Georgalas	17 – 26 June 2001	2.03 m (6 ft 8 in)	Iraklis	(Greece)
SF	8	Nikos Rogkavopoulos	17 – 27 June 2001	2.03 m (6 ft 8 in)	AEK	(Greece)
C	10	Manos Chatzidakis	19 – 21 April 2000	2.08 m (6 ft 10 in)	Maroussi	(Greece)
G	11	Nikos Arsenopoulos	18 – 19 May 2001	1.96 m (6 ft 5 in)	Olympiacos	(Greece)
C	14	Stratos Voulgaropoulos	18 – 31 October 2000	2.18 m (7 ft 2 in)	Aris	(Greece)
SF	15	Georgios Arnokouros	17 – 10 December 2001	2.01 m (6 ft 7 in)	Dafni	(Greece)
SG	16	Chrysostomos Sandramanis	19 – 5 April 2000	1.96 m (6 ft 5 in)	Promitheas	(Greece)
SF	18	Periklis Bazinas	18 – 20 November 2000	1.97 m (6 ft 6 in)	PAOK Tessaloniki	(Greece)

Head coach

- (Greece) Giannis Kastritis

Assistant coach(es)

- (Greece) Georgios Doxakis
- (Greece) Dimitrios Varvounis

Legend

- Club – describes last
  club before the tournament
- Age – describes age
  on 29 June 2019
