= 2019 FIBA Under-19 Basketball World Cup =

Tournament details
- Host country: Greece
- City: Heraklion
- Dates: 29 June – 7 July
- Teams: 16 (from 5 confederations)
- Venue: 2 (in 1 host city)

Final positions
- Champions: United States (7th title)

Tournament statistics
- MVP: (United States) Reggie Perry
- Top scorer: (Serbia) Pecarski (22.1)
- Top rebounds: (Mali) Ballo (11.8)
- Top assists: (United States) Haliburton (6.9)
- PPG (Team): United States (100.9)
- RPG (Team): Mali (53.7)
- APG (Team): United States (28.6)

Official website
- www.fiba.basketball

The 2019 FIBA Under-19 Basketball World Cup (Greek: Παγκόσμιο Κύπελλο Μπάσκετ FIBA Under-19 2019) was the 14th edition of the FIBA Under-19 Basketball World Cup, the biennial international men's youth basketball championship contested by the U19 national teams of the member associations of FIBA. It was hosted by Heraklion, Greece, from 29 June to 7 July 2019.

The United States won their seventh title, after defeating Mali 93–79 in the final.

== Venues ==
Heraklion		2019 FIBA Under-19 Basketball World Cup is located in Greece
Heraklion Indoor Sports Arena	Heraklion University Sports Hall	2019 FIBA Under-19 Basketball World Cup is located in Greece
Capacity: 5,222	Capacity: 1,080	2019 FIBA Under-19 Basketball World Cup is located in Greece

== Qualified teams ==
Means of Qualification	Dates	Venue	Berths	Qualifiers
Host Nation	12 September 2018	—N/a	1	Greece
2018 FIBA Under-18 Americas Championship	10–16 June 2018	(Canada) St. Catharines	4	United States; Canada; Argentina; Puerto Rico
2018 FIBA U18 European Championship	28 July–5 August 2018	(Latvia) Liepāja / Riga / Ventspils	5	Serbia; Latvia; France; Russia; Lithuania
2018 FIBA U18 Asian Championship	5–11 August 2018	(Thailand) Bangkok / Nonthaburi	4	Australia; New Zealand; China; Philippines
2018 FIBA Under-18 African Championship	24 August–2 September 2018	(Mali) Bamako	2	Mali; Senegal
Total			16	

== Draw ==
The draw for the tournament was held on 20 February 2019 in Heraklion, Greece.

Teams from the same region could not be drawn against each other, with the exception of Europe teams where one group could contain a maximum of two European teams.

=== Seeding ===
Teams were distributed into four pots based on sporting quality and geographical principles.

Pot 1	Pot 2	Pot 3	Pot 4
Greece; United States; Australia; Serbia	Latvia; France; Russia; Lithuania	Canada; Argentina; New Zealand; China	Puerto Rico; Philippines; Mali; Senegal

== Preliminary round ==
All times are local (UTC+3).

=== Group A ===
Pos	Team	Pld	W	L	PF	PA	PD	Pts
1	United States	3	3	0	300	213	+87	6
2	New Zealand	3	2	1	214	250	−36	5
3	Lithuania	3	1	2	235	231	+4	4
4	Senegal	3	0	3	174	229	−55	3

Source: FIBA
Rules for classification: 1) Points; 2) Head-to-head results; 3) Points difference; 4) Points scored.

29 June 2019
17:45

Boxscore

Senegal	52–76	Lithuania
Scoring by quarter: 12–18, 18–18, 8–27, 14–13
Pts: B. Faye 13; Rebs: Sylla 10; Asts: B. Faye 3		Pts: Jokubaitis 17; Rebs: Jarumbauskas 7 Asts: Jokubaitis 6

Heraklion University Sports Hall, Heraklion
Referees: Guilherme Locatelli (BRA), Yevgeniy Mikheyev (KAZ), James Boyer (AUS)

29 June 2019
20:00

Boxscore

United States	111–71	New Zealand
Scoring by quarter: 24–19, 20–16, 32–16, 35–20
Pts: Perry 20; Rebs: Williams 7 Asts: Haliburton 8		Pts: Moors 14; Rebs: Darling 6 Asts: Cameron 6

Heraklion University Sports Hall, Heraklion
Referees: Aleksandar Glišić (SRB), Yu Jung (TPE), Carsten Straube (GER)

30 June 2019
17:45

Boxscore

Lithuania	84–102	United States
Scoring by quarter: 16–28, 25–23, 19–25, 24–26
Pts: Venskus 19; Rebs: Urbonavičius 6 Asts: Jokubaitis 8		Pts: Cunningham, Haliburton 21; Rebs: Perry 10; Asts: Haliburton 8

Heraklion University Sports Hall, Heraklion
Referees: Juan Fernández (ARG), Markos Michaelides (SUI), Carlos Peralta (ECU)

30 June 2019
18:15

Boxscore

New Zealand	66–64	Senegal
Scoring by quarter: 13–15, 12–13, 10–18, 31–18
Pts: Perrott-Hunt 14; Rebs: Darling 13; Asts: three players 3		Pts: B. Faye 18; Rebs: B. Faye 13; Asts: Boissy, Diallo 5

Heraklion Indoor Sports Arena, Heraklion
Referees: Jorge Vázquez (PUR), Georgios Poursanidis (GRE), Ye Nan (CHN)

2 July 2019
16:00

Boxscore

New Zealand	77–75	Lithuania
Scoring by quarter: 18–21, 21–20, 21–15, 17–19
Pts: Darling 17; Rebs: Darling 11; Asts: Cameron 3		Pts: Giedraitis 19; Rebs: Venskus 11; Asts: Arlauskas 4

Heraklion University Sports Hall, Heraklion
Referees: Aleksandar Glišić (SRB), Ferdinand Pascual (PHI), Ye Nan (CHN)

2 July 2019
16:00

Boxscore

Senegal	58–87	United States
Scoring by quarter: 18–23, 17–24, 10–17, 13–23
Pts: C. Faye 12; Rebs: Sylla 11; Asts: Boissy, Diallo 4		Pts: Green, Suggs 14; Rebs: Williams 9 Asts: Lewis, Barnes 5

Heraklion Indoor Sports Arena, Heraklion
Referees: Yohan Rosso (FRA), Kim Jong-kuk (KOR), Kingsley Ojeaburu (NGA)

=== Group B ===
Pos	Team	Pld	W	L	PF	PA	PD	Pts
1	Canada	3	2	1	229	223	+6	5 (Note: Canada 3 Pts, +4 PD; Australia 3 Pts, −2 PD; Mali 3 Pts, −2 PD. Australia placed second with more points scored.)
2	Australia	3	2	1	239	212	+27	5
3	Mali	3	2	1	243	231	+12	5
4	Latvia	3	0	3	207	252	−45	3

Source: FIBA
Rules for classification: 1) Points; 2) Head-to-head results; 3) Points difference; 4) Points scored.
Notes:

29 June 2019
13:15

Boxscore

Mali	93–79	Latvia
Scoring by quarter: 22–17, 22–20, 24–12, 25–30
Pts: Coulibaly 22; Rebs: F. Drame 13; Asts: Diakité 6		Pts: Kurucs 21; Rebs: Vīksne 10; Asts: Bērziņš 6

Heraklion University Sports Hall, Heraklion
Referees: Ferdinand Pascual (PHI), Boris Krejič (SLO), Ahmed Al-Shuwaili (IRQ)

29 June 2019
15:30

Boxscore

Australia	76–81	Canada
Scoring by quarter: 13–20, 23–26, 22–12, 18–23
Pts: Stattmann 21; Rebs: Froling 13; Asts: Froling 6		Pts: Lawson, Mane 23; Rebs: Lawson 8 Asts: Brown 5

Heraklion University Sports Hall, Heraklion
Referees: Antonio Conde (ESP), Krishna Domínguez (MEX), Sergiy Zashchuk (UKR)

30 June 2019
13:45

Boxscore

Canada	70–71	Mali
Scoring by quarter: 17–19, 22–14, 11–24, 20–14
Pts: Ambrose-Hylton 16; Rebs: Mane 7 Asts: Mane 6		Pts: Kanouté 22; Rebs: F. Drame 15; Asts: Coulibaly, Kanouté 4

Heraklion Indoor Sports Arena, Heraklion
Referees: Aleksandar Glišić (SRB), Samir Abaakil (MAR), Kim Jong-kuk (KOR)

30 June 2019
16:00

Boxscore

Latvia	52–81	Australia
Scoring by quarter: 15–23, 9–23, 14–26, 14–9
Pts: Kurucs 16; Rebs: Kurucs, Mežulis 7 Asts: Būmeisters 4		Pts: Bowen 15; Rebs: Bowen 10; Asts: Wigness 7

Heraklion Indoor Sports Arena, Heraklion
Referees: Yohan Rosso (FRA), Yu Jung (TPE), Yevgeniy Mikheyev (KAZ)

2 July 2019
18:15

Boxscore

Canada	78–76	Latvia
Scoring by quarter: 18–15, 18–14, 22–19, 20–28
Pts: Samuel 22; Rebs: Samuel 17; Asts: Mane 5		Pts: Kurucs 22; Rebs: Šteinbergs 8 Asts: Kurucs 7

Heraklion Indoor Sports Arena, Heraklion
Referees: Jorge Vázquez (PUR), Markos Michaelides (SUI), Carlos Peralta (ECU)

2 July 2019
18:15

Boxscore

Mali	79–82	Australia
Scoring by quarter: 12–20, 16–13, 21–27, 30–22
Pts: Ballo 20; Rebs: Ballo, F. Drame 7 Asts: Kanouté 10		Pts: Macdonald 25; Rebs: Leaupepe 10; Asts: Lee, Macdonald 5

Heraklion University Sports Hall, Heraklion
Referees: Juan Fernández (ARG), Georgios Poursanidis (GRE), Carsten Straube (GER)

=== Group C ===
Pos	Team	Pld	W	L	PF	PA	PD	Pts
1	Argentina	3	3	0	236	224	+12	6
2	Russia	3	2	1	259	225	+34	5
3	Greece (H)	3	1	2	228	225	+3	4
4	Philippines	3	0	3	205	254	−49	3

Source: FIBA
Rules for classification: 1) Points; 2) Head-to-head results; 3) Points difference; 4) Points scored.
(H) Hosts

29 June 2019
18:15

Boxscore

Argentina	86–84 (OT)	Russia
Scoring by quarter: 22–19, 12–18, 26–16, 16–23, Overtime: 10–8
Pts: Cáffaro 17; Rebs: Marcos 7 Asts: Marcos 6		Pts: Ershov 22; Rebs: Kadoshnikov 14; Asts: Konovalov 5

Heraklion Indoor Sports Arena, Heraklion
Referees: Yohan Rosso (FRA), Matthew Myers (USA), Nicolas Fernandes (TAH)

29 June 2019
20:30

Boxscore

Greece	85–69	Philippines
Scoring by quarter: 20–27, 22–14, 21–16, 22–12
Pts: Arsenopoulos 18; Rebs: Sotiriou 9 Asts: Karampelas 6		Pts: Abadiano, Sotto 13; Rebs: Sotto 10; Asts: Ildefonso 4

Heraklion Indoor Sports Arena, Heraklion
Referees: Jorge Vázquez (PUR), Matthew Kallio (CAN), Carlos Peralta (ECU)

30 June 2019
20:00

Boxscore

Philippines	72–77	Argentina
Scoring by quarter: 15–22, 17–17, 19–19, 21–19
Pts: Ildefonso 22; Rebs: Ildefonso 10; Asts: Oczon 3		Pts: Giordano 18; Rebs: Cáffaro 7 Asts: Reyes 5

Heraklion University Sports Hall, Heraklion
Referees: Tolga Sahin (ITA), Boris Krejič (SLO), Sergiy Zashchuk (UKR)

30 June 2019
20:30

Boxscore

Russia	83–75	Greece
Scoring by quarter: 31–15, 18–19, 13–14, 21–27
Pts: Mikhailovskii 20; Rebs: Mikhailovskii 13; Asts: Mikhailovskii 12		Pts: Rogkavopoulos 28; Rebs: three players 5 Asts: Karampelas 4

Heraklion Indoor Sports Arena, Heraklion
Referees: Guilherme Locatelli (BRA), Ademir Zurapović (BIH), Krishna Domínguez (MEX)

2 July 2019
20:30

Boxscore

Argentina	73–68	Greece
Scoring by quarter: 9–13, 17–22, 22–16, 25–17
Pts: Marcos 17; Rebs: Cáffaro 10; Asts: Bolmaro 3		Pts: Arsenopoulos 20; Rebs: Sotiriou 7 Asts: Karampelas 4

Heraklion Indoor Sports Arena, Heraklion
Referees: Antonio Conde (ESP), Matthew Kallio (CAN), Yu Jung (TPE)

2 July 2019
20:30

Boxscore

Philippines	64–92	Russia
Scoring by quarter: 15–28, 15–21, 20–23, 14–20
Pts: Ildefonso, Sotto 14; Rebs: Sotto 7 Asts: Ildefonso 5		Pts: Ershov 21; Rebs: Mikhailovskii 10; Asts: Konovalov 5

Heraklion University Sports Hall, Heraklion
Referees: Ademir Zurapović (BIH), Yevgeniy Mikheyev (KAZ), Ahmed Al-Shuwaili (IRQ)

=== Group D ===
Pos	Team	Pld	W	L	PF	PA	PD	Pts
1	Serbia	3	3	0	266	207	+59	6
2	France	3	2	1	286	209	+77	5
3	China	3	1	2	212	319	−107	4
4	Puerto Rico	3	0	3	236	265	−29	3

Source: FIBA
Rules for classification: 1) Points; 2) Head-to-head results; 3) Points difference; 4) Points scored.

29 June 2019
13:45

Boxscore

China	57–106	Serbia
Scoring by quarter: 18–26, 16–27, 13–32, 10–21
Pts: Guo 29; Rebs: Guo 4 Asts: Guo, Shi 3		Pts: Petrušev 23; Rebs: Ilić 13; Asts: Mićović 4

Heraklion Indoor Sports Arena, Heraklion
Referees: Tolga Sahin (ITA), Scott Beker (AUS), Kingsley Ojeaburu (NGA)

29 June 2019
16:00

Boxscore

Puerto Rico	68–91	France
Scoring by quarter: 25–24, 21–29, 11–20, 11–18
Pts: Pérez 13; Rebs: Torres 7 Asts: Santiago, Pérez 4		Pts: Ayayi 26; Rebs: Dossou-Yovo 10; Asts: Dimanche 6

Heraklion Indoor Sports Arena, Heraklion
Referees: Ademir Zurapović (BIH), Juan Fernández (ARG), Samir Abaakil (MAR)

30 June 2019
13:15

Boxscore

France	119–56	China
Scoring by quarter: 24–12, 35–13, 28–9, 32–22
Pts: Makoundou 17; Rebs: Ayayi 6 Asts: Robineau 9		Pts: Jiao 12; Rebs: Jiao 7 Asts: Guo 3

Heraklion University Sports Hall, Heraklion
Referees: Ferdinand Pascual (PHI), James Boyer (AUS), Carsten Straube (GER)

30 June 2019
15:30

Boxscore

Serbia	75–74	Puerto Rico
Scoring by quarter: 27–12, 16–28, 21–16, 11–18
Pts: Petrušev 23; Rebs: Pecarski 14; Asts: Paunović, Trifunović 5		Pts: Strawther 22; Rebs: Torres 7 Asts: Santiago 8

Heraklion University Sports Hall, Heraklion
Referees: Antonio Conde (ESP), Matthew Kallio (CAN), Matthew Myers (USA)

2 July 2019
13:45

Boxscore

China	99–94	Puerto Rico
Scoring by quarter: 21–17, 23–22, 26–33, 29–22
Pts: Guo 34; Rebs: Guo 11; Asts: Guo 11		Pts: Strawther 35; Rebs: Torres 9 Asts: Curbelo 13

Heraklion University Sports Hall, Heraklion
Referees: Matthew Myers (USA), Krishna Domínguez (MEX), Boris Krejič (SLO)

2 July 2019
13:45

Boxscore

France	76–85	Serbia
Scoring by quarter: 20–26, 14–20, 24–18, 16–21
Pts: Ayayi 33; Rebs: Léopold 6 Asts: Dimanche 5		Pts: Pecarski 28; Rebs: Petrušev 13; Asts: Cerovina, Trifunović 4

Heraklion Indoor Sports Arena, Heraklion
Referees: Guilherme Locatelli (BRA), Sergiy Zashchuk (UKR), Scott Beker (AUS)

== Knockout stage ==
=== Bracket ===
Round of 16
3 July
United States	116
Latvia	66
3 July
Russia	96
China	83
3 July
Lithuania	91
Australia	74
3 July
Philippines	60
Serbia	87
3 July
New Zealand	62
Mali	77
3 July
Argentina	57
Puerto Rico	77
3 July
Senegal	79
Canada	90
3 July
Greece	46
France	77

Quarter-finals
5 July
United States	95
Russia	80
5 July
Lithuania (OT)	92
Serbia	85
5 July
Mali	84
Puerto Rico	74
5 July
Canada	80
France	85

Semi-finals
6 July
United States	102
Lithuania	67
6 July
Mali	76
France	73

Final
7 July
United States	93
Mali	79
Third place
7 July
Lithuania	68
France	73

5–8th place bracket

5–8th place semifinals
6 July
Russia	83
Serbia	79
6 July
Puerto Rico	98
Canada	81

Fifth place
7 July
Russia	77
Puerto Rico	74
Seventh place
7 July
Serbia	110
Canada	92

9–16th place bracket

9–16th place quarterfinals
5 July
Latvia	87
China	84
5 July
Australia	82
Philippines	60
5 July
New Zealand	79
Argentina	84
5 July
Senegal	97
Greece (2OT)	102

9–12th place semifinals
6 July
Latvia	80
Australia	94
6 July
Argentina	66
Greece	72

Ninth place
7 July
Australia	71
Greece	52
Eleventh place
7 July
Latvia	68
Argentina	74

13–16th place bracket

13–16th place semifinals
6 July
China	72
Philippines	86
6 July
New Zealand	87
Senegal	71

13th place
7 July
Philippines	70
New Zealand	76
15th place
7 July
China	73
Senegal	90

=== Round of 16 ===
3 July 2019
13:15

Boxscore

United States	116–66	Latvia
Scoring by quarter: 30–15, 29–16, 36–7, 21–28
Pts: Robinson-Earl, Williams 17; Rebs: Williams 12; Asts: Cunningham 10		Pts: Berķis 14; Rebs: three players 6 Asts: Būmeisters 7

Heraklion University Sports Hall, Heraklion
Referees: Ademir Zurapović (BIH), Carsten Straube (GER), Nicolas Fernandes (TAH)

3 July 2019
13:45

Boxscore

New Zealand	62–77	Mali
Scoring by quarter: 19–24, 10–16, 18–21, 15–16
Pts: Mennenga 13; Rebs: three players 7 Asts: Perrott-Hunt 4		Pts: Ballo 15; Rebs: Ballo 17; Asts: four players 3

Heraklion Indoor Sports Arena, Heraklion
Referees: Guilherme Locatelli (BRA), Markos Michaelides (SUI), Samir Abaakil (MAR)

3 July 2019
15:30

Boxscore

Russia	96–83	China
Scoring by quarter: 29–24, 25–11, 20–24, 22–24
Pts: Ershov 19; Rebs: Dolinin 7 Asts: Ershov, Kvitkovskikh 5		Pts: Guo 18; Rebs: Guo, Xu J. 6 Asts: Xu 5

Heraklion University Sports Hall, Heraklion
Referees: Ferdinand Pascual (PHI), Scott Beker (AUS), James Boyer (AUS)

3 July 2019
16:00

Boxscore

Argentina	57–77	Puerto Rico
Scoring by quarter: 17–9, 10–17, 10–16, 20–35
Pts: Ruesga 13; Rebs: Cáffaro 15; Asts: Farabello 4		Pts: Pérez 19; Rebs: Strawther 10; Asts: Curbelo, Pérez 4

Heraklion Indoor Sports Arena, Heraklion
Referees: Yohan Rosso (FRA), Krishna Domínguez (MEX), Sergiy Zashchuk (UKR)

3 July 2019
17:45

Boxscore

Lithuania	91–74	Australia
Scoring by quarter: 20–11, 13–10, 23–28, 35–25
Pts: Venskus 20; Rebs: Metrikis, Venskus 7 Asts: Jokubaitis, Vilys 6		Pts: Froling 17; Rebs: Froling 8 Asts: Wigness 4

Heraklion University Sports Hall, Heraklion
Referees: Matthew Kallio (CAN), Boris Krejič (SLO), Kim Jong-kuk (KOR)

3 July 2019
18:15

Boxscore

Philippines	60–87	Serbia
Scoring by quarter: 14–19, 14–24, 14–21, 18–23
Pts: Ildefonso 18; Rebs: Sotto 8 Asts: Sotto 3		Pts: Pecarski 21; Rebs: Ilić 10; Asts: Paunović 8

Heraklion Indoor Sports Arena, Heraklion
Referees: Antonio Conde (ESP), Matthew Myers (USA), Ahmed Al-Shuwaili (IRQ)

3 July 2019
20:00

Boxscore

Senegal	79–90	Canada
Scoring by quarter: 18–23, 20–17, 18–30, 23–20
Pts: B. Faye 30; Rebs: B. Faye 15; Asts: Boissy 5		Pts: Lawson 30; Rebs: Samuel 8 Asts: Squire, Lawson 4

Heraklion University Sports Hall, Heraklion
Referees: Yu Jung (TPE), Georgios Poursanidis (GRE), Ye Nan (CHN)

3 July 2019
20:30

Boxscore

Greece	46–77	France
Scoring by quarter: 14–18, 10–18, 10–20, 12–21
Pts: Sotiriou 12; Rebs: three players 7 Asts: Arsenopoulos 3		Pts: Niasse 13; Rebs: Dimanche 8 Asts: Dimanche 5

Heraklion Indoor Sports Arena, Heraklion
Referees: Jorge Vázquez (PUR), Aleksandar Glišić (SRB), Juan Fernández (ARG)

=== 9–16th place quarterfinals ===
5 July 2019
12:00

Boxscore

Latvia	87–84	China
Scoring by quarter: 24–23, 22–21, 19–20, 22–20
Pts: Vēveris 29; Rebs: Vēveris 8 Asts: Būmeisters 8		Pts: Guo 25; Rebs: Guo 9 Asts: Guo 12

Heraklion University Sports Hall, Heraklion
Referees: Jorge Vázquez (PUR), Samir Abaakil (MAR), Kingsley Ojeaburu (NGA)

5 July 2019
14:15

Boxscore

New Zealand	79–84	Argentina
Scoring by quarter: 14–24, 23–22, 26–17, 16–21
Pts: Perrott-Hunt 26; Rebs: Cameron, Darling 9 Asts: Cameron 7		Pts: Bolmaro 21; Rebs: Cáffaro 12; Asts: Giordano, Farabello 7

Heraklion University Sports Hall, Heraklion
Referees: Matthew Kallio (CAN), Carlos Peralta (ECU), Nicolas Fernandes (TAH)

5 July 2019
16:30

Boxscore

Australia	82–60	Philippines
Scoring by quarter: 23–11, 22–15, 20–18, 17–16
Pts: Froling 13; Rebs: Dalton 8 Asts: three players 4		Pts: Ildefonso 13; Rebs: Sotto 12; Asts: Abadiano, Amsali 3

Heraklion University Sports Hall, Heraklion
Referees: Aleksandar Glišić (SRB), Yevgeniy Mikheyev (KAZ), Kim Jong-kuk (KOR)

5 July 2019
18:45

Boxscore

Senegal	97–102 (2OT)	Greece
Scoring by quarter: 23–23, 19–26, 21–15, 22–21, Overtime: 7–7, 5–10
Pts: B. Faye 34; Rebs: B. Faye 19; Asts: Boissy 11		Pts: Arsenopoulos 35; Rebs: Voulgaropoulos 10; Asts: Rogkavopoulos 7

Heraklion University Sports Hall, Heraklion
Referees: Krishna Domínguez (MEX), Matthew Myers (USA), Sergiy Zashchuk (UKR)

=== Quarterfinals ===
5 July 2019
13:00

Boxscore

Mali	84–74	Puerto Rico
Scoring by quarter: 15–21, 22–12, 22–12, 25–29
Pts: F. Drame 22; Rebs: Ballo 17; Asts: H. Drame 5		Pts: Rosa 21; Rebs: Torres 9 Asts: Curbelo, Rolon 4

Heraklion Indoor Sports Arena, Heraklion
Referees: Guilherme Locatelli (BRA), Scott Beker (AUS), James Boyer (AUS)

5 July 2019
15:30

Boxscore

Lithuania	92–85 (OT)	Serbia
Scoring by quarter: 28–20, 11–19, 22–21, 16–17, Overtime: 15–8
Pts: Jokubaitis 21; Rebs: Venskus 7 Asts: Jokubaitis 10		Pts: Pecarski 25; Rebs: Pecarski 11; Asts: Petrušev 5

Heraklion Indoor Sports Arena, Heraklion
Referees: Yohan Rosso (FRA), Ferdinand Pascual (PHI), Georgios Poursanidis (GRE)

5 July 2019
18:00

Boxscore

United States	95–80	Russia
Scoring by quarter: 19–10, 32–17, 17–30, 27–23
Pts: Perry 28; Rebs: Perry, Robinson-Earl 8 Asts: Cunningham 9		Pts: Vedishchev 24; Rebs: Mikhailovskii 9 Asts: Mikhailovskii 6

Heraklion Indoor Sports Arena, Heraklion
Referees: Antonio Conde (ESP), Yu Jung (TPE), Carsten Straube (GER)

5 July 2019
20:30

Boxscore

Canada	80–85	France
Scoring by quarter: 22–25, 22–22, 17–18, 19–20
Pts: Lawson, Samuel 14; Rebs: Bediako 10; Asts: Lawson 4		Pts: Ayayi 25; Rebs: Ayayi 8 Asts: Ayayi 7

Heraklion Indoor Sports Arena, Heraklion
Referees: Juan Fernández (ARG), Ademir Zurapović (BIH), Ahmed Al-Shuwaili (IRQ)

=== 13–16th place semifinals ===
6 July 2019
12:00

Boxscore

China	72–86	Philippines
Scoring by quarter: 18–21, 19–20, 20–31, 15–14
Pts: Guo 23; Rebs: Ji, Jiang W. 7 Asts: Xu J. 8		Pts: Ildefonso 21; Rebs: Chiu 9 Asts: Ildefonso 7

Heraklion University Sports Hall, Heraklion
Referees: Matthew Myers (USA), Nicolas Fernandes (TAH), James Boyer (AUS)

6 July 2019
14:15

Boxscore

New Zealand	87–71	Senegal
Scoring by quarter: 22–22, 16–12, 21–22, 28–15
Pts: Cameron 19; Rebs: Darling 13; Asts: Perrott-Hunt 7		Pts: Badji 17; Rebs: Badji 10; Asts: C. Faye 6

Heraklion University Sports Hall, Heraklion
Referees: Jorge Vázquez (PUR), Scott Beker (AUS), Kingsley Ojeaburu (NGA)

=== 9–12th place semifinals ===
6 July 2019
16:30

Boxscore

Latvia	80–94	Australia
Scoring by quarter: 12–32, 25–17, 25–30, 18–15
Pts: Kurucs 21; Rebs: Mežulis 8 Asts: Būmeisters, Kurucs 6		Pts: Ducas 20; Rebs: four players 6 Asts: Lee 8

Heraklion University Sports Hall, Heraklion
Referees: Antonio Conde (ESP), Matthew Myers (USA), Markos Michaelides (SUI)

6 July 2019
20:30

Boxscore

Argentina	66–72	Greece
Scoring by quarter: 20–18, 15–19, 13–18, 18–17
Pts: Giordano 17; Rebs: Cáffaro 12; Asts: Marcos 5		Pts: Arsenopoulos, Arnokouros 14; Rebs: Sotiriou 8 Asts: Arsenopoulos 8

Heraklion University Sports Hall, Heraklion
Referees: Ferdinand Pascual (PHI), Ademir Zurapović (BIH), Kim Jong-kuk (KOR)

=== 5–8th place semifinals ===
6 July 2019
13:00

Boxscore

Russia	83–79	Serbia
Scoring by quarter: 23–17, 14–27, 19–17, 27–18
Pts: Vedishchev 22; Rebs: Ershov, Petenev 6 Asts: Vedishchev 9		Pts: Pecarski 25; Rebs: Ilić 14; Asts: Cerovina, Ilić 5

Heraklion Indoor Sports Arena, Heraklion
Referees: Juan Fernández (ARG), Yevgeniy Mikheyev (KAZ), Ahmed Al-Shuwaili (IRQ)

6 July 2019
15:30

Boxscore

Puerto Rico	98–81	Canada
Scoring by quarter: 30–19, 17–28, 26–19, 25–15
Pts: Curbelo 24; Rebs: Torres 13; Asts: Torres 7		Pts: Mane 14; Rebs: Bediako 7 Asts: Brown 4

Heraklion Indoor Sports Arena, Heraklion
Referees: Yohan Rosso (FRA), Carsten Straube (GER), Ye Nan (CHN)

=== Semifinals ===
6 July 2019
18:00

Boxscore

Mali	76–73	France
Scoring by quarter: 13–19, 26–14, 22–22, 15–18
Pts: Ballo, F. Drame 17; Rebs: Ballo, F. Drame 11; Asts: Kanouté 6		Pts: Dossou-Yovo 18; Rebs: Dimanche 10; Asts: Ayayi, Dimanche 5

Heraklion Indoor Sports Arena, Heraklion
Referees: Yu Jung (TPE), Krishna Domínguez (MEX), Matthew Kallio (CAN)

6 July 2019
20:30

Boxscore

United States	102–67	Lithuania
Scoring by quarter: 25–14, 19–18, 31–16, 27–19
Pts: Green 18; Rebs: Perry 14; Asts: Haliburton 7		Pts: Ramanauskas 10; Rebs: Bergaudas, Jokubaitis 5 Asts: Giedraitis 4

Heraklion Indoor Sports Arena, Heraklion
Referees: Guilherme Locatelli (BRA), Aleksandar Glišić (SRB), Boris Krejič (SLO)

=== 15th place game ===
7 July 2019
11:00

Boxscore

China	73–90	Senegal
Scoring by quarter: 14–22, 25–24, 18–19, 16–25
Pts: Ji 19; Rebs: Jiao 8 Asts: Xu K.		Pts: Sylla 23; Rebs: Sylla 14; Asts: Boissy, C. Faye 7

Heraklion University Sports Hall, Heraklion
Referees: Sergiy Zashchuk (UKR), Nicolas Fernandes (TAH), Kingsley Ojeaburu (NGA)

=== 13th place game ===
7 July 2019
13:15

Boxscore

Philippines	70–76	New Zealand
Scoring by quarter: 15–20, 22–25, 21–14, 12–17
Pts: Tamayo 24; Rebs: Tamayo 12; Asts: Ildefonso 5		Pts: Cameron 21; Rebs: Perrott-Hunt, Darling 8 Asts: three players 4

Heraklion University Sports Hall, Heraklion
Referees: Krishna Domínguez (MEX), Markos Michaelides (SUI), Samir Abaakil (MAR)

=== Eleventh place game ===
7 July 2019
15:30

Boxscore

Latvia	68–74	Argentina
Scoring by quarter: 13–18, 17–6, 18–22, 20–28
Pts: Kurucs, Vēveris 15; Rebs: Kurucs, Vīksne 8 Asts: Šteinbergs 5		Pts: Lugarini 13; Rebs: Lugarini 8 Asts: Bolmaro, Farabello 4

Heraklion University Sports Hall, Heraklion
Referees: Georgios Poursanidis (GRE), Yevgeniy Mikheyev (KAZ), Carlos Peralta (ECU)

=== Ninth place game ===
7 July 2019
15:30

Boxscore

Australia	71–52	Greece
Scoring by quarter: 20–11, 13–11, 20–17, 18–13
Pts: Macdonald 16; Rebs: Leaupepe 13; Asts: three players 3		Pts: Chougkaz 12; Rebs: Arnokouros, Sotiriou 4 Asts: Karampelas 3

Heraklion Indoor Sports Arena, Heraklion
Referees: Yohan Rosso (FRA), Matthew Kallio (CAN), Boris Krejič (SLO)

=== Seventh place game ===
7 July 2019
17:45

Boxscore

Serbia	110–92	Canada
Scoring by quarter: 28–20, 37–27, 26–20, 19–25
Pts: Petrušev 25; Rebs: Ilić 10; Asts: Mićović 8		Pts: Lawson 23; Rebs: Neath 4 Asts: Lawson 6

Heraklion University Sports Hall, Heraklion
Referees: Guilherme Locatelli (BRA), Scott Beker (AUS), Carsten Straube (GER)

=== Fifth place game ===
7 July 2019
13:00

Boxscore

Russia	77–74	Puerto Rico
Scoring by quarter: 17–26, 20–9, 23–18, 17–21
Pts: Vedishchev 22; Rebs: Kadoshnikov 15; Asts: Mikhailovskii 5		Pts: Strawther 40; Rebs: Strawther 10; Asts: Curbelo 8

Heraklion Indoor Sports Arena, Heraklion
Referees: Aleksandar Glišić (SRB), Kim Jong-kuk (KOR), Ye Nan (CHN)

=== Third place game ===
7 July 2019
18:00

Boxscore

Lithuania	68–73	France
Scoring by quarter: 13–18, 10–16, 23–15, 22–24
Pts: Metrikis 23; Rebs: Venskus 13; Asts: Jokubaitis, Venskus 4		Pts: Ayayi 33; Rebs: Dossou-Yovo 10; Asts: Dossou-Yovo 3

Heraklion Indoor Sports Arena, Heraklion
Referees: Jorge Vázquez (PUR), Ademir Zurapović (BIH), Ahmed Al-Shuwaili (IRQ)

=== Final ===
7 July 2019
20:30

Boxscore

United States	93–79	Mali
Scoring by quarter: 20–22, 22–18, 31–15, 20–24
Pts: Cunningham 21; Rebs: Likekele 10; Asts: Haliburton 8		Pts: Coulibaly, H. Drame 17; Rebs: H. Drame 9 Asts: H. Drame, Kanouté 4

Heraklion Indoor Sports Arena, Heraklion
Referees: Antonio Conde (ESP), Juan Fernández (ARG), Yu Jung (TPE)

== Final standings ==
Rank	Team	Record
1st place, gold medalist(s)	United States	7–0
2nd place, silver medalist(s)	Mali	5–2
3rd place, bronze medalist(s)	France	5–2
4th	Lithuania	3–4
5th	Russia	5–2
6th	Puerto Rico	2–5
7th	Serbia	5–2
8th	Canada	3–4
9th	Australia	5–2
10th	Greece	3–4
11th	Argentina	5–2
12th	Latvia	1–6
13th	New Zealand	4–3
14th	Philippines	1–6
15th	Senegal	1–6
16th	China	1–6

== Statistical leaders ==
Points

Name	PPG
(Serbia) Marko Pecarski	22.1
(Puerto Rico) Julian Strawther	22.0
(France) Joël Ayayi	20.9
(China) Guo Haowen	20.1
(Senegal) Biram Faye	19.4

Rebounds

Name	RPG
(Mali) Oumar Ballo	11.8
(Serbia) Dalibor Ilić	11.0
(Serbia) Filip Petrušev	10.1
(Senegal) Biram Faye	10.0
(New Zealand) Max Darling	9.3

Assists

Name	APG
(United States) Tyrese Haliburton	6.9
(Latvia) Rodrigo Bumeisters	5.8
(United States) Cade Cunningham	5.7
(China) Guo Haowen	5.7
(Senegal) Jean-Jacques Boissy	5.6
(Puerto Rico) André Curbelo	5.6
(Lithuania) Rokas Jokubaitis	5.6

Blocks

Name	BPG
(Mali) Oumar Ballo	3.8
(Senegal) Ibou Badji	3.1
(Philippines) Kai Sotto	3.1
(Russia) Dmitrii Kadoshnikov	2.0
(Serbia) Filip Petrušev	2.0

Steals

Name	SPG
(Mali) Hassan Drame	2.9
(Puerto Rico) Jermaine Miranda	2.9
(Puerto Rico) André Curbelo	2.7
(France) Karlton Dimanche	2.7
(Puerto Rico) Jorge Torres	2.6

== Awards ==
Award	Winner	Position	Team
Most Valuable Player	Reggie Perry	PF	United States
All-Tournament Team	Siriman Kanouté	PG	Mali
All-Tournament Team	Joël Ayayi	PG/SG	France
All-Tournament Team	Tyrese Haliburton	SG	United States
All-Tournament Team	Reggie Perry	PF	United States
All-Tournament Team	Oumar Ballo	C	Mali
