= Ioannis Kastritis =

Greek basketball player and coach (born 1982)

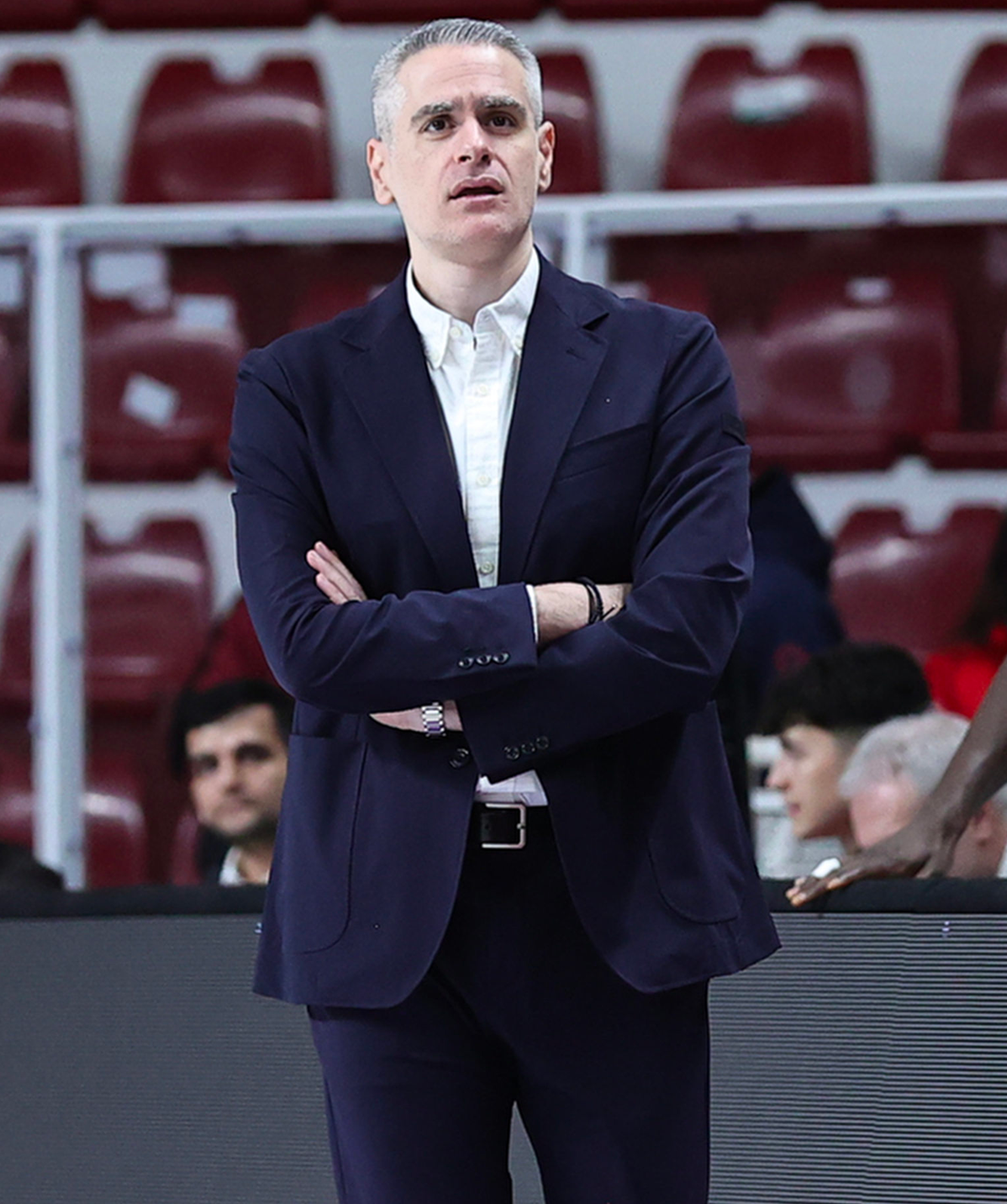

Openjobmetis Varese
- Position: Head coach
- League: LBA; Champions League

Personal information
- Born: April 4, 1982 (age 44) Tripoli, Greece
- Coaching career: 2005–present

Career history

Coaching
- 2005–2006: Apollon Patras (Cadets, Juniors)
- 2006–2008: Olympiada Patras (assistant)
- 2008–2009: Apoloniada
- 2009–2012: Arkadikos (assistant)
- 2012–2016: Arkadikos
- 2016–2017: Aries Trikala
- 2017–2018: Kymis
- 2018–present: Greece Under-19
- 2018–2019: Aris Thessaloniki
- 2019–2020: Iraklis Thessaloniki
- 2020–2021: Hapoel Tel Aviv
- 2021–2025: Aris Thessaloniki
- 2025–present: Pallacanestro Varese

Career highlights
- As head coach: Greek 2nd Division Coach of the Year (2015)

Ioannis Kastritis (alternate spelling: Giannis) (Greek: Ιωάννης Καστρίτης; born April 4, 1982) is a Greek former basketball player and professional basketball coach. He is the current head coach for Pallacanestro Varese of the Lega Basket Serie A (LBA).

== Coaching career ==
=== Clubs ===
Kastritis played basketball with G.S. Arkadias, Arkadikos and Panachaiki before starting his basketball coaching career as an assistant in Apoloniada. He was the assistant coach of Yannis Christopoulos at Olympiada Patras, in the 2006–07 and 2007–08 seasons.

From 2009 to 2012, he was the assistant coach in Arkadikos. In 2012, he became the head coach of the club. With Arkadikos, he won a league promotion to the Greek Basket League, after finishing 2nd in the 2014–15 Greek A2 Basket League season. In the same year, he was voted as the coach of the season in the A2 Division, and he became the youngest coach to lead a team to a Greek Basket League promotion.

On August 24, 2016, he was appointed by Aries Trikala, as the head coach of the team. Kastritis led the team to the best season of their history, as they finished in 10th place in the league, with a 10–16 record.

On May 2, 2017, Kastritis was appointed as the head coach of the Greek Basket League club Kymis. On November 25, 2018, Kastritis resigned from his position, after a string of negative results, and despite his successful 2017–18 campaign with the club.

On January 27, 2020, Kastritis was named the new head coach of Hapoel Tel Aviv. On May 11, 2020, Kastritis extended his contract with Hapoel until 2021.

In 2021, Kastritis returned to the head coach position of Aris. On June 15, 2023, he renewed his contract through 2025.

On February 13, 2025, he signed with Pallacanestro Varese of the Lega Basket Serie A (LBA).

=== National teams ===
Kastritis was the head coach of the Greek Under-19 national team, at the 2019 FIBA Under-19 World Cup, in which Greece finished in 10th place.
