= Klaidas Metrikis =

Lithuanian basketball player

Neptūnas-Akvaservis
- Position: Power forward
- League: National Basketball League

Personal information
- Born: February 21, 2000 (age 26) Klaipėda, Lithuania
- Listed height: 2.04 m (6 ft 8 in)
- Listed weight: 104 kg (229 lb)

Career information
- NBA draft: 2022: undrafted
- Playing career: 2016–present

Career history
- 2016–2022: Neptūnas Klaipėda
- 2016–2018: → Neptūnas-2
- 2018–2020: → Neptūnas-Akvaservis
- 2022–2023: Labas Gas Prienai
- 2023: Perlas Vilkaviškis
- 2023: BC Winterthur
- 2024-present: Neptūnas-Akvaservis

Klaidas Metrikis (born 21 February 2000) is a Lithuanian professional basketball player for Neptūnas-Akvaservis of the National Basketball League (NKL).

== Early career ==
Metrikis joined Klaipėda's prestigious basketball academy, the Vladas Knašius Basketball School (VKKM), at an early age. In the 2015–16 season, the team were the runner ups in the MKL U16 Lithuanian Championship. In the following season, the team became the Lithuanian U17 champions, and was led by Metrikis, along with teammates Rokas Jokubaitis and Matas Vaitkus. Metrikis averaged 14.5 points and 7.8 rebounds. For two seasons from 2015 to 2017, he also competed at the semi-pro level and represented Neptūnas-2 in the 3rd Lithuanian Division RKL, where he averaged 12.5 points and 4.1 rebounds in the 2016–17 season.

== Professional career ==
Metrikis started his professional career by signing with Neptūnas Klaipėda in summer 2018. He spent his first two seasons with the club's reserve team Neptūnas-Akvaservis, which competes at 2nd Lithuanian League NKL. After an impressive 2019–20 season with Neptūnas Akvaservis where he averaged 13.8 points and 36.5% accuracy from three point line, Metrikis gained a lot of media coverage, and was frequently named among the top young NKL players, gaining interest from notable European and NCAA teams. However Metrikis decided to continue his career in his hometown, and in March 2020 he was invited to main the main squad of Neptūnas Klaipėda, where he debuted in Lithuanian's top division LKL, scoring four points in one minute off the bench. In the 2020–21 season, his role in the team increased as he averaged 3.6 points in 12 minutes per game.

== National team career ==
Metrikis represented Lithuania at the 2019 FIBA Under-19 Basketball World Cup, where the Lithuanian U19 team finished at 4th place. Metrikis averaged 10.4 points, 3.7 rebounds and 0.4 steals in seven games played. He also competed at the 2018 FIBA Under-18 European Championship, averaging 6.7 points, 3.0 rebounds and 1.3 steals in seven games as the team finished fifth overall.
