= A. J. Lawson =

Canadian basketball player (born 2000)

A.J. Lawson
- Lawson with Baskonia in 2026

No. 1 – Baskonia
- Position: Shooting guard / small forward
- League: Liga ACB; EuroLeague

Personal information
- Born: July 15, 2000 (age 26) Toronto, Ontario, Canada
- Listed height: 2.01 m (6 ft 7 in)
- Listed weight: 185 lb (84 kg)

Career information
- High school: St. Marguerite d'Youville (Brampton, Ontario); GTA Prep (Mississauga, Ontario)
- College: South Carolina (2018–2021)
- NBA draft: 2021: undrafted
- Playing career: 2021–present

Career history
- 2021–2022: College Park Skyhawks
- 2022: Guelph Nighthawks
- 2022: College Park Skyhawks
- 2022: Minnesota Timberwolves
- 2022: →Iowa Wolves
- 2022–2024: Dallas Mavericks
- 2022–2024: →Texas Legends
- 2024: Long Island Nets
- 2024–2026: Toronto Raptors
- 2024–2026: →Raptors 905
- 2026–present: Baskonia

Career highlights
- All-NBA G League Second Team (2026); Second-team All-SEC (2021); SEC All-Freshman Team (2019)
- Stats at NBA.com
- Stats at Basketball Reference
Medals
Men's basketball
Representing Canada
FIBA Americas U18 Championship
Silver medal – second place	2018 Canada	Team

Anthony Randolph "A.J." Lawson (born July 15, 2000) is a Canadian professional basketball player for Saski Baskonia of the Spanish Liga ACB and the EuroLeague. He played college basketball for the South Carolina Gamecocks.

== Early life ==
Lawson grew up in Brampton, Ontario and attended GTA Prep in Mississauga, a basketball academy based out of Mississauga Secondary School where he was coached by David Cooper. In his grade 12 season, Lawson was named a National Preparatory Association First Team All-Star and led the team to second place in the NPA championships. Originally set to graduate in 2019 and ranked 40th in his class by 247Sports as well as fourth-best Canadian prospect by North Pole Hoops, Lawson reclassified for the class of 2018. Lawson committed to playing college basketball for South Carolina over offers from Tulane and Creighton. South Carolina head coach Frank Martin began recruiting Lawson after a late night workout in Columbia on the trip back from a tournament.

== College career ==
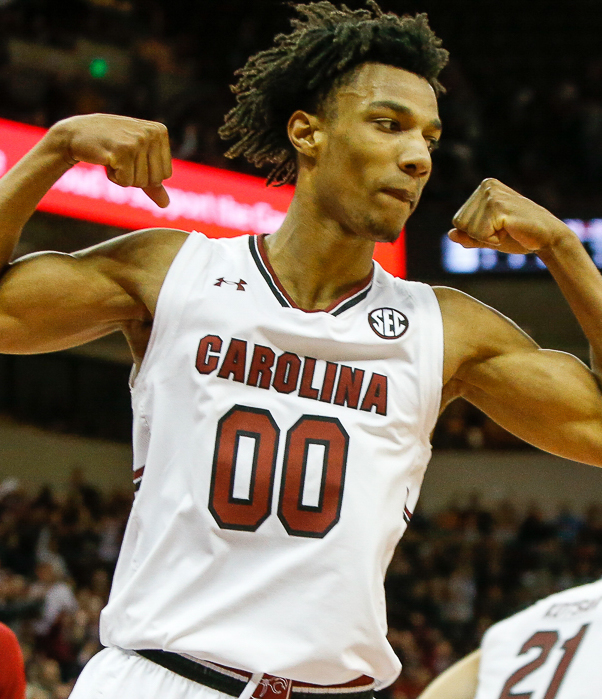
Lawson in February 2019

Lawson averaged 13.4 points, 4.3 rebounds and 2.9 assists per game in 29 games played and was named to the Southeastern Conference (SEC) All-Freshman team. He was named the SEC Freshman of the Week on November 19, 2018, after averaging 15.7 points, 6.3 rebounds and 5.3 assists over a three-game stretch against Norfolk State, Providence and George Washington. Following the season he initially entered his name into the 2019 NBA draft, but decided to withdraw and return to South Carolina for his sophomore season.

Lawson was named to the preseason first team All-SEC and to the Jerry West Award watchlist going into his sophomore year. He was also named the 41st-best collegiate basketball player going into the 2019–20 season by CBS Sports and the 29th-best prospect for the 2020 NBA draft by ESPN. Lawson scored a season-high 28 points on November 15, 2019, in a 90–63 win against Cleveland State. Lawson led the team during the season in total points with 416 and points per game at 13.4 while also averaging 3.7 rebounds, 1.9 assists and 1.2 steals per game. Following the season, he declared for the 2020 NBA draft but did not hire an agent. Lawson decided to withdraw from the draft and return to South Carolina on July 29. On January 6, 2021, Lawson scored a career-high 30 points in a 78–54 win over Texas A&M. As a junior, he averaged 16.6 points, 4.1 rebounds, 1.2 assists and 1.5 steals per game. He was named to the Southeastern Conference (SEC) All-Second Team. On April 19, 2021, he declared for the 2021 NBA draft and signed an agent.

== Professional career ==
=== College Park Skyhawks (2021–2022) ===
After going undrafted in the 2021 NBA draft, Lawson joined the Miami Heat and Atlanta Hawks for the 2021 NBA Summer League. On September 22, 2021, Lawson signed with the Atlanta Hawks. However, he was waived on October 7. In October 2021, Lawson signed with the College Park Skyhawks where he played 26 games and averaged 11.8 points, 6.3 rebounds and 1.3 steals per game, while shooting 48.1% from the field.

=== Guelph Nighthawks (2022) ===
On April 26, 2022, Lawson signed with the Guelph Nighthawks of the CEBL.

=== Minnesota Timberwolves / Iowa Wolves (2022) ===
Lawson joined the Dallas Mavericks for the 2022 NBA Summer League. In five games, he averaged 15.6 points and 6.0 rebounds, while shooting 51.9% from the field. Later, on July 19, 2022, Lawson signed a two-way contract with the Minnesota Timberwolves. On October 15, 2022, Lawson was waived by the Timberwolves.

=== Return to College Park (2022) ===
On November 3, 2022, Lawson was named to the opening night roster for the College Park Skyhawks. On November 16, Lawson signed another two-way contract with the Timberwolves, but was waived on December 8. Two days later, he returned to College Park.

=== Dallas Mavericks / Texas Legends (2022–2024) ===
On December 26, 2022, Lawson signed a two-way contract with the Dallas Mavericks, splitting time with their NBA G League affiliate, the Texas Legends. It was converted to a standard-contract on March 4, 2024. Lawson reached the 2024 NBA Finals where the Mavericks lost to the Boston Celtics in five games. On October 8, he was waived by the Mavericks and three days later, he signed another two-way contract. However, he was waived once again on October 18.

=== Long Island Nets (2024) ===
On October 27, 2024, Lawson signed with the Long Island Nets.

=== Toronto Raptors (2024–2026) ===
On December 11, 2024, Lawson signed a two-way contract with the Toronto Raptors. On March 10, 2025, Lawson scored a career-high 32 points with 12 rebounds against the Washington Wizards. He posted 28 points in 36 minutes off the bench against the Philadelphia 76ers two days later, shooting 10-20 from the field and 4-9 from three in a 118-105 victory. On April 12, Lawson and the Raptors converted his two-way contract into a two-year, non-guaranteed contract. He made 26 appearances (two starts) for Toronto during the 2024–25 NBA season, averaging 9.1 points, 3.3 rebounds, and 1.2 assists.

On October 16, 2025, Lawson was waived by the Raptors. Two days later, he re-signed with the team on a two-way contract. On April 11, 2026, the Raptors converted Lawson's contract into a standard contract.

=== Baskonia (2026–present) ===
On July 27, 2026, Lawson signed with Baskonia of the Spanish Liga ACB and the EuroLeague.

== National team career ==
Lawson has competed internationally for the Canada men's national under-19 basketball team. He averaged 14.8 points, 5.4 rebounds and 1.2 assists per game in the 2018 FIBA Under-18 Americas Championship as Canada finished second in the tournament. Lawson posted team highs with 18 points and 12 rebounds in Canada's 113–74 loss to the United States in the tournament final.

In the 2019 FIBA Under-19 Basketball World Cup, Lawson averaged a team-best 16.7 points with 3.9 rebounds and 3.4 assists per game in seven games as Canada advanced to the quarterfinals. He also had the highest scoring performance of the tournament with a 31-point game against Senegal.

Lawson made his debut with Canada's senior men's national team during the first round of the FIBA Basketball World Cup 2023 Americas Qualifiers.

== Career statistics ==
Legend
GP	Games played	GS	Games started	MPG	Minutes per game
FG%	Field goal percentage	3P%	3-point field goal percentage	FT%	Free throw percentage
RPG	Rebounds per game	APG	Assists per game	SPG	Steals per game
BPG	Blocks per game	PPG	Points per game	**Bold**	Career high

=== NBA ===
==== Regular season ====
Year	Team	GP	GS	MPG	FG%	3P%	FT%	RPG	APG	SPG	BPG	PPG
2022–23	Minnesota	1	0	1.8	**1.000**	—	—	1.0	.0	.0	.0	2.0
2022–23	Dallas	14	0	7.6	.488	.400	.250	1.4	.1	.1	.0	3.9
2023–24	Dallas	**42**	0	7.4	.446	.260	.652	1.2	.5	.2	.1	3.2
2024–25	Toronto	26	**2**	**18.6**	.421	.327	.683	**3.3**	**1.2**	**.5**	**.2**	**9.1**
2025–26	Toronto	24	0	9.4	.436	**.422**	**.778**	1.8	.3	**.5**	**.2**	4.2
Career		107	2	10.6	.439	.339	.661	1.9	.6	.3	.1	4.9

==== Playoffs ====
Year	Team	GP	GS	MPG	FG%	3P%	FT%	RPG	APG	SPG	BPG	PPG
2024	Dallas	**10**	0	3.0	**.444**	**.333**	.500	.3	.0	.0	.1	1.1
2026	Toronto	7	0	**7.3**	.250	.250	**1.000**	**.4**	**.6**	.0	**.3**	**1.7**
Career		17	0	4.8	.320	.286	.750	.4	.2	.0	.2	1.4

=== College ===
Year	Team	GP	GS	MPG	FG%	3P%	FT%	RPG	APG	SPG	BPG	PPG
2018–19	South Carolina	29	28	29.9	.411	**.358**	.667	**4.3**	**2.9**	1.1	**.2**	13.4
2019–20	South Carolina	**31**	**31**	29.1	**.414**	.339	**.724**	3.7	1.9	1.2	.1	13.4
2020–21	South Carolina	21	21	**31.3**	.394	.351	.700	4.1	1.2	**1.5**	.1	**16.6**
Career		81	80	30.0	.407	.349	.697	4.0	2.1	1.2	.2	14.2
