= Guo Haowen =

Chinese basketball player (born 2000)

Guo Haowen 郭昊文
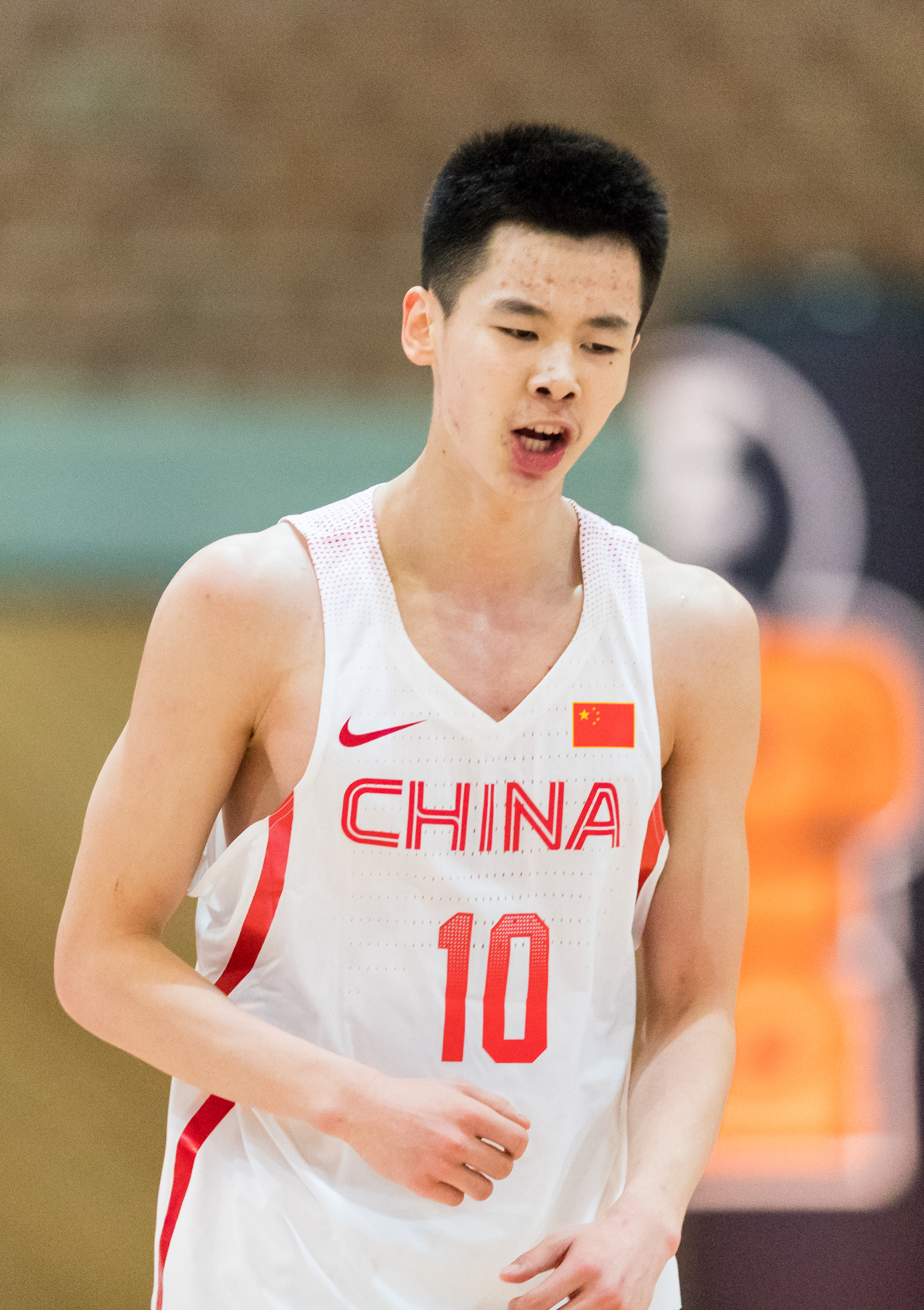
- Guo with the national team at the 2018 Albert Schweitzer Tournament

No. 10 – Nanjing Monkey Kings
- Position: Shooting guard / small forward
- League: CBA

Personal information
- Born: 31 January 2000 (age 26) Qingdao, Shandong, China
- Listed height: 2.03 m (6 ft 8 in)
- Listed weight: 91 kg (201 lb)

Career information
- NBA draft: 2022: undrafted
- Playing career: 2018–present

Career history
- 2018–2020: Bayi Rockets
- 2021–2024: Shanghai Sharks
- 2024–present: Nanjing Monkey Kings
Medals
Men's basketball
Representing China
FIBA Asia Under-18 Championship
Bronze medal – third place	2018 Nonthaburi

Guo Haowen (Chinese: 郭昊文; pinyin: Guō Hàowén; born 31 January 2000) is a Chinese professional basketball player for the Nanjing Monkey Kings of the Chinese Basketball Association (CBA). He entered his name for the 2021 NBA draft, but withdrew and returned to the CBA.

== Professional career ==
=== Bayi Rockets (2018–2020) ===
In 2018, Guo joined the Bayi Rockets of Chinese Basketball Association (CBA), becoming the first player who was born in the year 2000 to join the league. As a rookie, he played in 43 games, made six starts, posting an average of 9.1 points, 3.5 rebounds and 1.8 assists in 17.6 minutes of action per game for the 2018–19 season.

In the 2019–20 season, Guo started in two of 19 games, averaging 10.7 points, 2.9 rebounds and 1.7 assists in 21.7 minutes per game while shooting 37.7 percent from the field.

Following Guo's second season, the Rockets withdrew from the league on 20 October 2020.

=== Shanghai Sharks (2021–present) ===
On 26 February 2021, Guo signed with the Shanghai Sharks, joining the team at the middle of the 2020–21 season. He made seven starts in 15 games, logging an average of 13.9 points, 4.1 rebounds and 3.1 assists in 25.9 minutes of play per game while shooting 38.6 percent from the field.

On 31 May 2021, Guo declared for the 2021 NBA draft. On 14 June, he was selected as one of the 40 prospects for the 2021 NBA G League Elite Camp. On 8 July, Guo withdrew from the draft.

Guo returned to the Sharks for the 2021–22 season.

After going undrafted in the 2022 NBA draft, Guo joined the Dallas Mavericks for the 2022 NBA Summer League.

== National team career ==
Guo made his international debut for China at the 2018 FIBA Under-18 Asian Championship, where he led the team in assists. In a game against Indonesia, he logged a double-double with 11 points and 13 assists. Guo averaged 18.7 points, 6.3 rebounds and 5.4 assists per game.

The following year, Guo suited up for the Chinese squad at the 2019 FIBA Under-19 Basketball World Cup, leading the team in all key categories (efficiency, points, rebounds and assists per game). His tournament highlights included a triple-double with 34 points, 11 rebounds and 11 assists in a game against Puerto Rico. Guo narrowly missed his second tournament triple-double with 25 points, 9 rebounds and 12 assists in a game against Latvia. He finished the tournament ranking fourth in points per game and third in assists. Guo averaged 20.1 points, 5.7 rebounds and 5.7 assists per game.

== Career statistics ==
Legend
GP	Games played	GS	Games started	MPG	Minutes per game
FG%	Field goal percentage	3P%	3-point field goal percentage	FT%	Free throw percentage
RPG	Rebounds per game	APG	Assists per game	SPG	Steals per game
BPG	Blocks per game	PPG	Points per game	**Bold**	Career high

=== CBA ===
==== Regular season ====
Year	Team	GP	GS	MPG	FG%	3P%	FT%	RPG	APG	SPG	BPG	PPG
2018–19	Bayi	**43**	6	17.6	.385	.268	.762	3.5	1.8	.7	.1	9.1
2019–20	Bayi	19	2	21.7	.377	.222	.762	2.9	1.7	**1.1**	**.2**	10.7
2020–21	Shanghai	15	7	**25.9**	.386	.242	.765	**4.1**	**3.1**	1.0	**.2**	**13.9**
2021–22	Shanghai	34	**10**	21.8	**.52**	**.35**	**.78**	2.3	2.1	0.7	.1	13.7
Career		111	25	-	-	-	-	-	-	-	-	-
