= Nikos Chougkaz =

Greek basketball player (born 2000)

- Chougkaz with PAOK in 2026

No. 9 – PAOK Thessaloniki
- Position: Power forward
- League: Greek Basketball League; EuroCup

Personal information
- Born: 4 October 2000 (age 26) Athens, Greece
- Listed height: 6 ft 10 in (2.08 m)
- Listed weight: 220 lb (100 kg)

Career information
- High school: Papacharalampio Private School (Athens, Greece)
- College: Northwestern State (2019–2020)
- NBA draft: 2021: undrafted
- Playing career: 2018–present

Career history
- 2018–2019: Panionios
- 2020–2021: Ionikos Nikaia
- 2021–2024: Panathinaikos
- 2021–2022: →Ionikos Nikaia
- 2023–2024: →Peristeri
- 2024–2025: Andorra
- 2025: Cedevita Olimpija
- 2025–present: PAOK Thessaloniki

Career highlights
- Greek League Best Young Player (2021)

Nikolaos Chougkaz (alternate spellings: Chougaz, Hougkaz, Hougaz) (Greek: Νικόλαος "Νίκος" Χουγκάζ; Coptic: Ⲛⲓⲕⲟⲗⲁⲟⲥ "Ⲛⲓⲕⲟⲥ" Ⲭⲱⲅⲕⲁⲍ; Arabic: نيكولاوس "نيكوس" شوكاز; born 4 October 2000) is a Greek professional basketball player for PAOK Thessaloniki of the Greek Basketball League (GBL) and the EuroCup. Internationally he represents the Greek national team. At a height of 6 ft 10 in (2.08 m) tall, he plays the power forward position.

== Youth career ==
Chougkaz played three seasons of youth system basketball with the Greek club Peristeri.

== College career ==
Chougkaz played at a fully professional level of competition in the 2018–19 season. However, he was still able to retain his personal amateur status for the NCAA DI. That was because his contract with Panionios Athens was structured so that his salary would be below the maximum limit that the NCAA allows in order for players to keep their NCAA eligibility.

Chougkaz moved to the United States, in order to play college basketball at Northwestern State University. He played with the Northwestern State Demons, during the 2019–20 season. During his Freshman season, he averaged 9.2 points, 7.2 rebounds, 1.2 assists, 1.0 steals, and 0.7 blocks per game, while shooting 40.7% overall from the field, 28.0% from three-point range, and 70.1% from the free-throw line. Ultimately, Chougkaz only played with the Demons for that one season, and he then returned to Greece, to play professionally.

== Professional career ==
=== Panionios (2018–2019) ===
Chougaz started his professional career with Panionios Athens of the Greek Basket League in 2018. In his first season playing at a pro club level (2018–19), he averaged 3.4 points, 1.1 rebounds, 0.1 assists, 0.2 steals, and 0.1 blocks per game, while shooting 42.9% overall from the field, 41.2% from 2-point range, 50.0% from 3-point range, and 87.5% from the free-throw line. While playing with Panionios, his contract allowed him to retain his amateur status for the NCAA.

=== Ionikos Nikaia (2020–2021) ===
After spending the 2019–20 season with the college basketball team Northwestern State, he joined the Greek League club Ionikos Nikaia.

On November 22, 2020, Chougaz recorded career-highs in both points and rebounds, after he scored 18 points and grabbed 11 rebounds, in his team΄s win over Lavrio. On March 21, 2021, he tied the best three-point shooting record of the Greek League, after he shot 7 for 7 from three-point distance, in a win against Larisa. He finished that game with 23 points, 6 rebounds, and 2 assists, and he was later named league's MVP of the Week. He averaged 10.6 points, 6.3 rebounds, 0.8 assists, 0.9 steals, and 0.4 blocks per game, while shooting 42.9% overall from the field, 45.2% from 2-point range, 39.2% from 3-point range, and 74.7% from the free-throw line. during the Greek League's 2020–21 season.

=== Panathinaikos (2021–2024) ===
On July 20, 2021, Chougkaz signed a four-year contract with Greek Basket League champions and EuroLeague mainstays Panathinaikos. He would remain on loan to Ionikos for the 2021–2022 season. In 12 league games with Ionikos, Chougkaz averaged 7.2 points and 4.2 rebounds in 27 minutes per contest.

Chougkaz was recalled to Panathinaikos on February 7, 2022. On February 25, 2022, he made his EuroLeague debut, at the age of 21, in a game against Crvena zvezda. In 13 league games with Panathinaikos, he averaged 3.8 points and 2.5 rebounds in 10 minutes per contest. Additionally, he appeared in a total of 4 EuroLeague games.

On February 3, 2023, after a half-season of limited playing time in 8 domestic league matches, Chougkaz was loaned to Peristeri, to be developed under their head coach Vassilis Spanoulis. In 9 games, he averaged 5.3 points and 4.3 rebounds in 15 minutes per contest.

During the 2023 offseason, Chougkaz was informed that he would be returning to the active roster of Panathinaikos for evaluation under the club's new head coach Ergin Ataman. However, on August 11, 2023, it was announced that Chougkaz would remain on loan to Peristeri for the 2023–2024 campaign.

On June 30, 2024, Chougkaz was released from the Greek powerhouse and became a free agent.

=== Andorra (2024–2025) ===
On July 10, 2024, Chougkaz signed a one-year contract with MoraBanc Andorra of the Spanish Liga ACB.

Chougkaz established himself as a regular member of Andorra's rotation during the 2024–25 season. He appeared in 30 Liga ACB games, starting 17 of them, and averaged 9.5 points, 5.8 rebounds and 1.0 assist in 21.6 minutes per game. He shot 42.6% from three-point range and averaged a performance index rating of 12.2. He also appeared in two Basketball Champions League qualifying games, averaging 9.5 points and 9.5 rebounds per game.

=== Cedevita Olimpija (2025) ===
On July 2, 2025, Chougkaz joined Slovenian club Cedevita Olimpija ahead of the 2025–26 season, marking his first appearances in both the ABA League and the EuroCup.

During his stint in Ljubljana, he appeared in seven ABA League games, averaging 8.9 points and 3.0 rebounds in 17.1 minutes per game. In the EuroCup, he played six games, four as a starter, and averaged 6.7 points, 5.7 rebounds and 0.8 assists in 21.6 minutes per game. His final appearance for Cedevita came on December 30, 2025, when he recorded 9 points and 11 rebounds in an 89–60 EuroCup victory over Aris in Thessaloniki.

=== PAOK Thessaloniki (2025–present) ===
On December 31, 2025, Chougkaz returned to Greece and signed with PAOK Thessaloniki on a two-and-a-half-year contract, keeping him with the club through the end of the 2027–28 season.

Chougkaz joined PAOK midway through the 2025–26 season and became part of the team's frontcourt rotation. In the 2025–26 FIBA Europe Cup, he appeared in six games for PAOK, averaging 7.2 points and 4.5 rebounds in 17.9 minutes per game.

On March 18, 2026, during the second leg of PAOK's FIBA Europe Cup quarter-final against Peristeri, Chougkaz suffered a serious right ankle injury. Medical examinations revealed ruptures of both the medial and lateral collateral ligaments, with an initial recovery estimate of four to six weeks.

After initially undergoing conservative treatment, further evaluation revealed clinical instability in the ankle. PAOK subsequently announced that Chougkaz would undergo surgical repair, with the operation scheduled for April 16. The decision effectively ended his 2025–26 season and began a rehabilitation programme aimed at having him fully recovered for the following campaign.

== National team career ==
=== Greek junior national team ===
Chougkaz was a member of the junior national teams of Greece. With Greece's under-18 junior national team, he played at the 2018 FIBA Europe Under-18 Championship. He averaged 2.8 points, 1.0 rebounds, 0.2 assists, and 0.6 steals per game at the tournament. With Greece's under-19 junior national team, he played at the 2019 FIBA Under-19 World Cup. He averaged 5.7 points, 2.9 rebounds, 0.1 assists, 0.7 steals, and 0.4 blocks per game at the tournament.

=== Greek senior national team ===
Chougkaz first played with the senior Greek national team on 20 February 2021, when he played at the 2022 EuroBasket qualifiers. In his first game with the men's national team, he had 3 points and 1 rebound in Greece's 84–69 loss to Bosnia and Herzegovina. Overall, in two games played, he averaged 4.0 points, 2.0 rebounds, and 0.5 blocks per game during the qualifiers. He also played with Greece at the 2023 FIBA World Cup qualifiers.

== Personal life ==
Chougaz΄s Greek mother, Sonia Dafkou, was a long-time professional basketball player, having also played for Panathinaikos. His Coptic Egyptian father Chris, who was born in Alexandria, Egypt, is a former professional basketball player and a coach. He has been the head coach of numerous clubs in Europe. His twin brother Robert, plays college basketball at Northwestern State University.
