= 2019–20 Pittsburgh Panthers men's basketball team =

American college basketball season

2019–20 Pittsburgh Panthers men's basketball

Fort Myers Tip-Off champions
- Conference: Atlantic Coast Conference
- Record: 16–17 (6–14 ACC)
- Head coach: Jeff Capel (2nd season)
- Assistant coaches: Tim O'Toole (2nd season); Milan Brown (2nd season); Jason Capel (2nd season)
- Home arena: Petersen Events Center (Capacity: 12,508)

2019–20 ACC men's basketball standings
	Conf.				Overall
Team	W		L	PCT	W		L	PCT
No. 4 Florida State	16	–	4	.800	26	–	5	.839
No. 16 Virginia	15	–	5	.750	23	–	7	.767
No. 14 Louisville	15	–	5	.750	24	–	7	.774
No. 11 Duke	15	–	5	.750	25	–	6	.806
Georgia Tech*	11	–	9	.550	17	–	14	.548
NC State	10	–	10	.500	20	–	12	.625
Syracuse	10	–	10	.500	18	–	14	.563
Notre Dame	10	–	10	.500	20	–	12	.625
Clemson	9	–	11	.450	16	–	15	.516
Miami (FL)	7	–	13	.350	15	–	16	.484
Boston College	7	–	13	.350	13	–	18	.419
Virginia Tech	7	–	13	.350	16	–	16	.500
Wake Forest	6	–	14	.300	13	–	18	.419
Pittsburgh	6	–	14	.300	16	–	17	.485
North Carolina	6	–	14	.300	14	–	19	.424
*Ineligible for postseason due to NCAA violations. Note: The 2020 ACC tournament was cancelled before the quarterfinals due to the COVID-19 pandemic. Rankings from AP poll

The 2019–20 Pittsburgh Panthers men's basketball team represented the University of Pittsburgh during the 2019–20 NCAA Division I men's basketball season. The Panthers were led by second-year head coach Jeff Capel and played their home games at the Petersen Events Center in Pittsburgh, Pennsylvania as members of the Atlantic Coast Conference.

The Panthers finished the season 16–17, and 6–14 in ACC play. They defeated to Wake Forest in the first round of the ACC tournament before losing to NC State in the second round. The tournament was cancelled before the Quarterfinals due to the COVID-19 pandemic. The NCAA tournament and NIT were also cancelled due to the pandemic.

== Previous season ==
The Panthers finished the 2018–19 season 14–19 overall and 3–15 in ACC play, finishing fourteenth in the conference. The Panthers defeated Boston College in the first round of the ACC tournament but lost to Syracuse in the second round.

== Offseason ==
=== Departures ===
Name	Number	Pos.	Height	Weight	Year	Hometown	Reason for departure
Shamiel Stevenson	0	G/F	6'6"	230	Sophomore	Toronto, ON	Mid season transferred to Nevada
Malik Ellison	3	G	6'6"	215	RS Junior	Voorhees, NJ	Graduate transferred to Hartford
Jared Wilson-Frame	4	G/F	6'5"	220	Senior	Hartford, CT	Graduated
Sidy N'Dir	11	G	6'2"	190	Graduate Student	Cosne-Cours-sur-Loire, France	Graduated
Joe Mascaro	12	G	5'10"	170	Senior	Pittsburgh, PA	Graduated
Khameron Davis	13	G	6'4"	195	Sophomore	Highlands Ranch, CO	Transferred to Weber State
Peace Ilegomah	42	C	6'9"	235	Sophomore	Benin City, Nigeria	Mid season transferred to Evansville

=== Incoming transfers ===
Name	Number	Pos.	Height	Weight	Year	Hometown	Previous School
Eric Hamilton	0	F	6'9"	250	GS Senior	Atlanta, GA	Transferred from UNC Greensboro. Will be eligible to play immediately since Hamilton graduated from UNC Greensboro.
Ithiel Horton	3	G	6'3"	180	Sophomore	Vauxhall, NJ	Transferred from Delaware. Under NCAA transfer rules, Hornton will have to sit out the 2019–20 season. Will have three years of remaining eligibility.
Ryan Murphy	24	G	6'2"	185	Junior	Calabasas, CA	Junior college transferred from New Mexico Junior College Murphy graduated and will transfer elsewhere for the 2020–21 season; his final season of eligibility.

=== 2019 recruiting class ===
College recruiting
Name	Hometown	School	Height	Weight	Commit date
Abdoul Karim Coulibaly; C	Scotland, PA	Scotland Performance Institute	6 ft 9 in (2.06 m)	230 lb (100 kg)	Feb 15, 2019
Abdoul Karim Coulibaly; C	Recruit ratings: Scout: Rivals: 247Sports: ESPN:				
Gerald Drumgoole; SF	Rochester, NY	La Lumiere School	6 ft 5 in (1.96 m)	195 lb (88 kg)	Feb 11, 2019
Gerald Drumgoole; SF	Recruit ratings: Scout: Rivals: 247Sports: ESPN:				
Justin Champagnie; SF	Brooklyn, NY	Bishop Loughlin Memorial High School	6 ft 6 in (1.98 m)	205 lb (93 kg)	Feb 11, 2019
Justin Champagnie; SF	Recruit ratings: Scout: Rivals: 247Sports: ESPN:				
Overall recruit ranking: Rivals: 40
Note: In many cases, Scout, Rivals, 247Sports, On3, and ESPN may conflict in their listings of height and weight.; In these cases, the average was taken. ESPN grades are on a 100-point scale.; Sources: "2019 Team Ranking". Rivals.

=== 2020 recruiting class ===
College recruiting (2019)
Name	Hometown	School	Height	Weight	Commit date
Noah Collier; SF	Mullica Hill, NJ	Westtown School	6 ft 7 in (2.01 m)	200 lb (91 kg)	Sep 23, 2019
Noah Collier; SF	Recruit ratings: Scout: Rivals: 247Sports: ESPN:				
John Hugley IV; C	Lyndhurst, OH	Brush High School	6 ft 8 in (2.03 m)	240 lb (110 kg)	Oct 18, 2019
John Hugley IV; C	Recruit ratings: Scout: Rivals: 247Sports: ESPN:				
Max Amadasun; C	Bronx, NY	Our Savior Lutheran High School	6 ft 10 in (2.08 m)	230 lb (100 kg)	Oct 15, 2019
Max Amadasun; C	Recruit ratings: Scout: Rivals: 247Sports: ESPN:				
Femi Odukale; G	Brooklyn, NY	Springfield Commonwealth Academy	6 ft 5 in (1.96 m)	190 lb (86 kg)	Apr 16, 2020
Femi Odukale; G	Recruit ratings: Scout: Rivals: 247Sports: ESPN:				
William Jeffress Jr. PF	Erie, PA	McDowell	6 ft 7 in (2.01 m)	205 lb (93 kg)	Apr 28, 2020
William Jeffress Jr. PF	Recruit ratings: Scout: Rivals: 247Sports: ESPN:				
Overall recruit ranking: Rivals: 20
Note: In many cases, Scout, Rivals, 247Sports, On3, and ESPN may conflict in their listings of height and weight.; In these cases, the average was taken. ESPN grades are on a 100-point scale.; Sources: "2020 Team Ranking". Rivals.

== Roster ==
2019–20 Pittsburgh Panthers men's basketball team
Players
Coaches

Pos.	#	Name	Height	Weight	Year	Previous school	Hometown
F	0	Eric Hamilton	6 ft 9 in (2.06 m)	230 lb (104 kg)	GS	UNC Greensboro	Atlanta, GA
G	1	Xavier Johnson	6 ft 3 in (1.91 m)	200 lb (91 kg)	So	Bishop O'Connell HS	Woodbridge, VA
G	2	Trey McGowens	6 ft 4 in (1.93 m)	190 lb (86 kg)	So	Hargrave Military Academy	Piedmont, SC
G	3	Ithiel Horton (redshirt)	6 ft 3 in (1.91 m)	200 lb (91 kg)	So	Delaware	Vauxhall, NJ
G/F	4	Gerald Drumgoole	6 ft 5 in (1.96 m)	200 lb (91 kg)	Fr	La Lumiere School	Rochester, NY
G	5	Au'Diese Toney	6 ft 6 in (1.98 m)	210 lb (95 kg)	So	Trinity Christian Academy	Huntsville, AL
G/F	11	Justin Champagnie	6 ft 6 in (1.98 m)	200 lb (91 kg)	Fr	Bishop Loughlin HS	Brooklyn, NY
F	12	Abdoul Karim Coulibaly	6 ft 8 in (2.03 m)	215 lb (98 kg)	Fr	Scotland Campus	Bamako, Mali
G	13	KJ Marshall (W)	5 ft 9 in (1.75 m)	165 lb (75 kg)	Fr	Trinity Christian Academy	Reading, PA
G	14	Curtis Aiken Jr. (W)	6 ft 1 in (1.85 m)	200 lb (91 kg)	RS Fr	North Allegheny Senior HS	Wexford, PA
F	15	Kene Chukwuka (injured)	6 ft 9 in (2.06 m)	225 lb (102 kg)	Sr	New Mexico Junior College	Stockholm, Sweden
F/C	21	Terrell Brown	6 ft 10 in (2.08 m)	235 lb (107 kg)	Jr	Tilton School	Providence, RI
G	22	Anthony Starzynski (W)	6 ft 3 in (1.91 m)	190 lb (86 kg)	Sr	Baldwin HS	Pittsburgh, PA
F	23	Samson George	6 ft 7 in (2.01 m)	220 lb (100 kg)	Jr	Iona	Minna, Nigeria
G	24	Ryan Murphy	6 ft 2 in (1.88 m)	185 lb (84 kg)	Jr	New Mexico Junior College	Calabasas, CA
G	31	Onyebuchi Ezeakudo (injured) (W)	6 ft 0 in (1.83 m)	180 lb (82 kg)	So	Homestead HS	Fort Wayne, IN
G	42	Chayce Smith	6 ft 3 in (1.91 m)	185 lb (84 kg)	So	The Kiski School	Mount Laurel, NJ

Head coach

- Jeff Capel (Duke)

Assistant coach(es)

- Tim O'Toole (Fairfield)
- Milan Brown (Howard)
- Jason Capel (North Carolina)

Legend

- (C) Team captain
- (S) Suspended
- (I) Ineligible
- (W) Walk-on
- Injured
- Current redshirt

Roster

== Schedule and results ==
Date time, TV	Rank^{#}	Opponent^{#}	Result	Record	High points	High rebounds	High assists	Site (attendance) city, state
Exhibition
October 30, 2019*; 7:00 pm		Slippery Rock	W 98–47	–	17 – Johnson	8 – Coulibaly	8 – McGowens	Petersen Events Center; Pittsburgh, PA
Regular season
November 6, 2019; 8:00 pm, ESPNU		Florida State	W 63–61	1–0 (1–0)	13 – Johnson	7 – McGowens	5 – McGowens	Petersen Events Center (9,016); Pittsburgh, PA
November 9, 2019*; 12:00 pm, ACCNX		Nicholls	L 70–75	1–1	28 – Murphy	9 – Toney	3 – Tied	Petersen Events Center (7,956); Pittsburgh, PA
November 12, 2019*; 6:00 pm, ESPNU		at Robert Morris	W 71–57	2–1	25 – McGowens	9 – Brown	7 – Johnson	UPMC Events Center (4,034); Moon Township, PA
November 15, 2019*; 7:00 pm, ESPNU		West Virginia; Backyard Brawl	L 53–68	2–2	13 – McGowens	5 – Champagnie	5 – Johnson	Petersen Events Center (11,725); Pittsburgh, PA
November 18, 2019*; 7:00 pm, ACCN		Monmouth; Fort Myers Tip-Off campus site game	W 63–50	3–2	16 – McGowens	10 – Champagnie	9 – Johnson	Petersen Events Center (6,753); Pittsburgh, PA
November 21, 2019*; 7:00 pm, ACCNX		Arkansas–Pine Bluff; Fort Myers Tip-Off campus site game	W 66–41	4–2	18 – Champagnie	8 – Hamilton	6 – Johnson	Petersen Events Center (7,068); Pittsburgh, PA
November 25, 2019*; 6:00 pm, FS1		vs. Kansas State; Fort Myers Tip-Off semifinals	W 63–59	5–2	13 – Tied	12 – Hamilton	1 – Tied	Suncoast Credit Union Arena (3,013); Fort Myers, FL
November 27, 2019*; 8:30 pm, FS1		vs. Northwestern; Fort Myers Tip-Off championship	W 72–59	6–2	21 – Champagnie	12 – Hamilton	8 – Johnson	Suncoast Credit Union Arena (2,046); Fort Myers, FL
December 3, 2019*; 9:00 pm, ESPNU		Rutgers; ACC–Big Ten Challenge	W 71–60	7–2	20 – Johnson	8 – Hamilton	8 – Johnson	Petersen Events Center (7,894); Pittsburgh, PA
December 6, 2019; 9:00 pm, ACCN		at No. 1 Louisville	L 46–64	7–3 (1–1)	15 – Johnson	7 – Toney	3 – McGowens	KFC Yum! Center (17,249); Louisville, KY
December 16, 2019*; 7:00 pm, ACCN		Northern Illinois	W 59–50	8–3	18 – McGowens	7 – Tied	3 – 3 tied	Petersen Events Center (7,015); Pittsburgh, PA
December 20, 2019*; 7:00 pm, ACCN		Binghamton	W 79–53	9–3	14 – Champagnie	10 – Champagnie	6 – Johnson	Petersen Events Center (7,226); Pittsburgh, PA
December 30, 2019*; 12:00 pm, ACCRSN/ATTSNPT		Canisius	W 87–79	10–3	21 – Champagnie	6 – Champagnie	8 – Johnson	Petersen Events Center (8,035); Pittsburgh, PA
January 4, 2020; 12:00 pm, ACCNX		Wake Forest	L 65–69	10–4 (1–2)	18 – Murphy	8 – Tied	6 – Johnson	Petersen Events Center (10,155); Pittsburgh, PA
January 8, 2020; 7:00 pm, ACCN		at North Carolina	W 73–65	11–4 (2–2)	24 – McGowens	8 – Champagnie	8 – McGowens	Dean Smith Center (20,798); Chapel Hill, NC
January 12, 2020; 6:00 pm, ACCN		at Miami (FL)	L 58–66	11–5 (2–3)	18 – McGowens	11 – Champagnie	7 – McGowens	Watsco Center (6,387); Coral Gables, FL
January 14, 2020; 7:00 pm, ACCN		No. 11 Louisville	L 68–73 ^{OT}	11–6 (2–4)	24 – McGowens	11 – Champaigne	5 – Johnson	Petersen Events Center (9,221); Pittsburgh, PA
January 18, 2020; 12:00 pm, ESPN		North Carolina	W 66–52	12–6 (3–4)	20 – Johnson	7 – Toney	6 – Johnson	Petersen Events Center (12,376); Pittsburgh, PA
January 22, 2020; 9:00 pm, ACCRSN/ATTSNPT		Boston College	W 74–72	13–6 (4–4)	17 – Champaigne	10 – Champaigne	10 – Johnson	Petersen Events Center (7,230); Pittsburgh, PA
January 25, 2020; 12:00 pm, ACCN		at Syracuse	L 61–69	13–7 (4–5)	14 – Champaigne	9 – Champaigne	7 – Johnson	Carrier Dome (23,711); Syracuse, NY
January 28, 2020; 9:00 pm, ESPN		at No. 9 Duke	L 67–79	13–8 (4–6)	27 – Toney	7 – Champagnie	6 – McGowens	Cameron Indoor Stadium (9,314); Durham, NC
February 2, 2020; 12:00 pm, ACCN		Miami (FL)	W 62–57	14–8 (5–6)	17 – McGowens	10 – Toney	6 – Johnson	Petersen Events Center (9,759); Pittsburgh, PA
February 5, 2020; 6:30 pm, ACCN		at Notre Dame	L 72–80	14–9 (5–7)	20 – Champagnie	11 – Champagnie	5 – McGowens	Edmund P. Joyce Center (6,534); South Bend, IN
February 8, 2020; 2:00 pm, ACCRSN/ATTSNPT		Georgia Tech	W 73–64	15–9 (6–7)	30 – Champagnie	9 – Champagnie	9 – McGowens	Petersen Events Center (10,754); Pittsburgh, PA
February 12, 2020; 9:00 pm, ACCRSN/ATTSNPT		Clemson	L 52–72	15–10 (6–8)	11 – Champagnie	6 – Champagnie	5 – Johnson	Petersen Events Center (7,530); Pittsburgh, PA
February 15, 2020; 6:00 pm, ACCN		at Virginia Tech	L 57–67	15–11 (6–9)	12 – Tied	9 – Champagnie	7 – McGowens	Cassell Coliseum (9,275); Blacksburg, VA
February 18, 2020; 8:00 pm, ACCN		at No. 8 Florida State	L 67–82	15–12 (6–10)	15 – Toney	7 – Toney	7 – Johnson	Donald L. Tucker Center (9,014); Tallahassee, FL
February 22, 2020; 12:00 pm, ESPN2		Virginia	L 56–59	15–13 (6–11)	16 – Johnson	9 – Brown	4 – Johnson	Petersen Events Center (10,133); Pittsburgh, PA
February 26, 2020; 7:00 pm, ACCN		Syracuse	L 49–72	15–14 (6–12)	13 – Champagnie	17 – Champagnie	5 – Johnson	Petersen Events Center (9,001); Pittsburgh, PA
February 29, 2020; 12:00 pm, ACCN		at NC State	L 73–77	15–15 (6–13)	24 – Toney	9 – Hamilton	5 – McGowens	PNC Arena (15,818); Raleigh, NC
March 4, 2020; 9:00 pm, ACCRSN/ATTSNPT		at Georgia Tech	L 57–73	15–16 (6–14)	12 – Hamilton	9 – Hamilton	3 – McGowens	McCamish Pavilion (4,746); Atlanta, GA
ACC tournament
March 10, 2020; 4:30 pm, ACCN	(13)	vs. (12) Wake Forest; First round	W 81–72	16–16	31 – Champagnie	7 – Coulibaly	8 – Johnson	Greensboro Coliseum (13,310); Greensboro, NC
March 11, 2020; 2:00 pm, ESPN	(13)	vs. (5) NC State; Second round	L 58–73	16–17	15 – Johnson	9 – Hamilton	3 – McGowens	Greensboro Coliseum; Greensboro, NC
*Non-conference game. ^{#}Rankings from AP Poll. (#) Tournament seedings in parentheses. All times are in Eastern Time.
