= Max Darling =

Vincentian-New Zealand basketball player

No. 8 – Southland Sharks
- Position: Forward
- League: NZNBL

Personal information
- Born: 30 September 2000 (age 26) Saint Vincent and the Grenadines
- Listed height: 198 cm (6 ft 6 in)
- Listed weight: 118 kg (260 lb)

Career information
- High school: Christ's College (Christchurch, New Zealand); Nelson College (Nelson, New Zealand)
- NBA draft: 2022: undrafted
- Playing career: 2017–present

Career history
- 2017–2018: Canterbury Rams
- 2018–2020: Vrijednosnice Osijek
- 2020–2021: Illawarra Hawks
- 2021–2025: Canterbury Rams
- 2021–2022: Athletic Constanța
- 2023–2026: New Zealand Breakers
- 2026–present: Southland Sharks

Career highlights
- NBL Ignite Cup winner (2026); 3× NZNBL champion (2023, 2024, 2026); NZNBL Youth Player of the Year (2018)
Medals
Men's basketball
Representing New Zealand
FIBA Asia Cup
Bronze medal – third place	2022 Jakarta

Maxwell Ronaldo McKenzie Darling (born 30 September 2000) is a Vincentian-New Zealand professional basketball player for the Southland Sharks of the New Zealand National Basketball League (NZNBL). In 2023 and 2024, he helped the Canterbury Rams win back-to-back NZNBL championships. Between 2023 and 2026, he played for the New Zealand Breakers of the Australian National Basketball League (NBL).

== Early life ==
Darling was born in Saint Vincent and the Grenadines. He spent most of his childhood in New Zealand. Darling learnt how to dunk a basketball at the age of 12. He attended high school at Christ's College in Christchurch and Nelson College in Nelson. Darling participated in the Mainland Eagles Basketball Academy in Christchurch where he first caught the attention of the Canterbury Rams of the New Zealand National Basketball League (NZNBL).

== Professional career ==
Darling played two games for the Canterbury Rams of the NZNBL in 2017 when he was sixteen-years-old. He returned to the Rams for the 2018 season when he averaged 9.3 points and 5.8 rebounds per game and earned the NZNBL Youth Player of the Year Award.

On 18 August 2018, Darling signed with Vrijednosnice Osijek of the Croatian Premijer liga. He became the first New Zealand teenage basketball player to sign in Europe who did not have a European passport. Darling averaged 10.2 points and 5.4 rebounds during the 2019–20 season before it was ended early due to the COVID-19 pandemic.

On 5 August 2020, Darling signed with the Illawarra Hawks of the Australian National Basketball League (NBL) on a three-year deal. He appeared in 17 games and averaged five minutes per game. On 19 July 2021, Darling and the Hawks mutually agreed to part ways.

Darling returned to the Rams for the 2021 NZNBL season. He played for Athletic Constanța of the Romanian Liga Națională during the 2021–22 season. Darling again returned to the Rams for the 2022 NZNBL season. He won a NZNBL championship with the Rams during the 2023 NZNBL season and averaged 12.9 points and 5.4 rebounds per game.

On 26 September 2023, Darling signed with the New Zealand Breakers of the NBL as a development player. He only appeared in one game for the Breakers during the 2023–24 NBL season. Darling returned to the Rams for the 2024 NZNBL season, winning a second consecutive championship.

On 7 August 2024, Darling was elevated to a full roster spot by the Breakers and signed a new two-year contract with a third-year option. On 19 October 2024, he scored 15 points in an 89–85 win over the Perth Wildcats.

Darling re-joined the Rams for the 2025 New Zealand NBL season.

On 2 December 2025, Darling was ruled out for six weeks with a fractured eye socket. He returned to action in mid January 2026. A week after returning, he suffered a knee injury.

Darling joined the Southland Sharks for the 2026 New Zealand NBL season, but missed the start of the season due to an ankle injury. He missed the NZNBL grand final with a calf injury, as the Sharks won the championship with a 104–101 overtime victory over the Wellington Saints.

== National team career ==
In 2018, Darling was invited to participate in training camp for the New Zealand men's national basketball team in preparation for the 2019 FIBA Basketball World Cup. He played for the New Zealand men's national under-19 basketball team at the 2019 FIBA Under-19 Basketball World Cup.

Darling was named to the final roster for the New Zealand men's national basketball team at the 2022 FIBA Asia Cup, where the team finished in third place.

In May 2025, Darling was named in the Tall Blacks squad for a trans-Tasman series against Australia. Two months later, he was named in the Tall Blacks squad for the 2025 FIBA Asia Cup.

In November 2025, Darling was named in the Tall Blacks squad for the first window of the FIBA Basketball World Cup 2027 Asian Qualifiers. He went on to miss the window due to a concussion. In February 2026, he was named in the squad for two more Asian qualifiers.
