= Abdoul Karim Coulibaly =

American basketball player

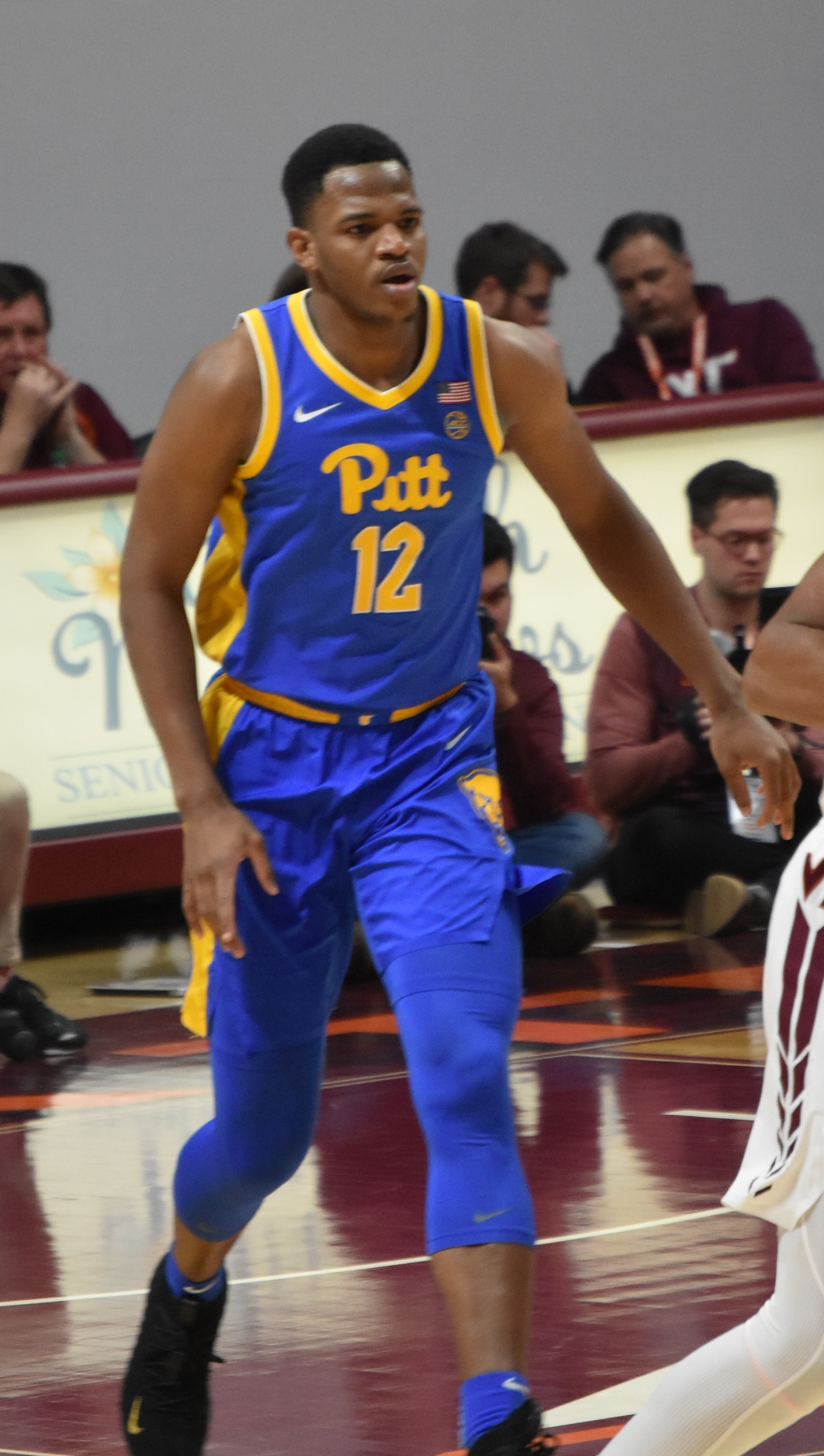
- Coulibaly with Pittsburgh in 2020

No. 19 – CRB Tombouctou
- Position: Power forward
- League: Road to BAL

Personal information
- Born: 23 December 2000 (age 25) Bamako, Mali
- Listed height: 6 ft 9 in (2.06 m)
- Listed weight: 235 lb (107 kg)

Career information
- High school: Scotland Performance Institute (Scotland, Pennsylvania)
- College: Pittsburgh (2019–2021); St. Bonaventure (2021–2022); UMass Lowell (2022–2025)
- Playing career: 2025–present

Career history
- 2025: CRB Tombouctou

Career highlights
- Second-team All-America East (2023)
Medals
Men's basketball
Representing Mali
FIBA Under-19 World Cup
| Silver medal – second place | 2019 Greece | Team |
FIBA Africa U18 Championship
| Gold medal – first place | 2018 Mali | Team |

Abdoul Karim Coulibaly (born 23 December 2000) is a Malian professional basketball player for the CRB Tombouctou in the Road to BAL. He played college basketball for the UMass Lowell River Hawks, Pittsburgh Panthers and the St. Bonaventure Bonnies. Coulibaly is also a member of the Mali national basketball team.

== Early life ==
Coulibaly grew up in Bamako and played soccer before switching to basketball at age 13, immediately excelling in the new sport. He moved to the United States at the age of 14 and attended the Scotland Performance Institute in Scotland, Pennsylvania. As a senior, he averaged 15.6 points and 11.4 rebounds per game on a team that finished 36–2. Coulibaly earned 2019 Mid-Atlantic Conference Player of the Year honors. He scored over 1,000 points and led the school all-time in scoring, rebounds, single-game points (42) and single-game rebounds (22).

== College career ==
Coulibaly played sparingly as a freshman and averaged 2.7 points and 1.7 rebounds per game. He increased his scoring to 4.9 points per game over the past eight games. Coulibaly thought that he did not improve much due to a poor work ethic, and struggled with errors in translation as his native language is Bambara. On 23 January 2021, he scored a career-high 15 points in a 76–75 loss to Wake Forest. As a sophomore, Coulibaly averaged 5.2 points and 3.9 rebounds per game. Following the season, he transferred to St. Bonaventure, choosing the Bonnies over Georgetown, Arizona State, Wichita State, Butler, VCU, George Washington, Marshall, and Bradley. He averaged 3.7 points and 1.7 rebounds per game as a junior. Coulibaly transferred to UMass Lowell following the season. As a senior, he averaged 11.4 points and 7.6 rebounds per game. Coulibaly was named to the Second Team All-America East Conference.

== National team career ==
=== U19 national team ===
Coulibaly has represented Mali in several international competitions. He averaged 13 points and 11 rebounds per game to lead Mali to the FIBA U-18 African Championship in 2018. In July 2019, he competed for the Mali team that won a silver medal at the FIBA U19 World Cup. Coulibaly averaged 13.1 points, 6.9 rebounds, 2.4 assists and 2.1 steals per game. In the gold medal game against the United States, he scored 17 points and had three blocks.

=== Senior national team ===
Coulibaly was selected for the Mali senior team to play at AfroBasket 2021. In 17 minutes per game, he averaged 5.7 points.

== Professional career ==
In November 2025, Coulibaly made his professional debut with the Malian team CRB Tombouctou in the Road to BAL. He helped the team to a third place in the West Division, by averaging 10.4 points per game. He scored 19 points in the third place game, in which they defeated the Spintex Knights.

== Career statistics ==
Legend
| GP | Games played | GS | Games started | MPG | Minutes per game |
| FG% | Field goal percentage | 3P% | 3-point field goal percentage | FT% | Free throw percentage |
| RPG | Rebounds per game | APG | Assists per game | SPG | Steals per game |
| BPG | Blocks per game | PPG | Points per game | **Bold** | Career high |

=== College ===
| Year | Team | GP | GS | MPG | FG% | 3P% | FT% | RPG | APG | SPG | BPG | PPG |
|---|---|---|---|---|---|---|---|---|---|---|---|---|
| 2019–20 | Pittsburgh | 26 | 0 | 9.9 | .420 | .000 | .480 | 1.7 | .2 | .2 | .2 | 2.7 |
| 2020–21 | Pittsburgh | 22 | **20** | **22.5** | **.511** | **.333** | **.690** | **3.9** | **.9** | **.7** | **.9** | **5.2** |
| 2021–22 | St. Bonaventure | **33** | 1 | 9.6 | .500 | **.333** | .609 | 1.7 | .2 | .3 | .4 | 3.7 |
| Career | | 81 | 21 | 13.1 | .483 | .300 | .597 | 2.3 | .4 | .4 | .4 | 3.8 |
