= Aristotelis Sotiriou =

Greek basketball player

No. 10 – Vikos Falcons
- Position: Power forward
- League: Greek Basketball League

Personal information
- Born: July 13, 2001 (age 25) Thessaloniki, Greece
- Listed height: 6 ft 8 in (2.03 m)
- Listed weight: 214 lb (97 kg)

Career information
- College: Texas A&M–Corpus (2019–2020); Adelphi (2020–2023)
- NBA draft: 2023: undrafted
- Playing career: 2017–present

Career history
- 2017–2019: Promitheas Patras
- 2023–2024: PAOK Thessaloniki
- 2024–2025: Koroivos Amaliadas
- 2025–2026: NE Megarida
- 2026–present: Vikos Falcons

Career highlights
- All-Greek Elite League Team (2026)

Aristotelis Sotiriou (Greek: Αριστοτέλης Σωτηρίου; born July 13, 2001) is a Greek basketball player who plays as a power forward for Vikos Falcons of the Greek Basketball League (GBL). He is 2.03 m (6 ft 8 in) tall.

== Early life and college career ==
Sotiriou was born in Thessaloniki, Greece. He began his basketball career in Greece with Promitheas Patras, before moving to the United States to continue his education and basketball development at the collegiate level.

Sotiriou began his college career with the Texas A&M–Corpus Christi Islanders during the 2019–20 season. He appeared in six games before transferring to Adelphi University.

At Adelphi, Sotiriou played for the Adelphi Panthers from 2020 to 2023. During the 2022–23 season, he appeared in 25 games, including seven starts, and averaged 8.0 points, 3.7 rebounds and 1.0 assist per game. He recorded a career-high 23 points against Molloy and 12 rebounds against Jefferson.

During his college career, Sotiriou also received academic recognition, including selection to the Northeast-10 Conference Academic Honor Roll and the D2ADA Academic Achievement Award.

After completing his college career in the United States, Sotiriou returned to Greece to begin his professional career.

== Professional career ==
=== PAOK (2023–2024) ===
Sotiriou returned to Greece in 2023 and joined PAOK. During the 2023–24 season, he appeared in the Greek Basket League and the Basketball Champions League.

=== NE Megarida (2025–2026) ===
Sotiriou subsequently joined NE Megarida, continuing his professional career in Greece.

== International career ==
Sotiriou represented Greece at several youth international levels. He played for the Greece U16, Greece U18, Greece U19 and Greece U20 teams.

At the 2019 FIBA Under-18 European Championship, Sotiriou averaged 10.7 points, 6.6 rebounds and 1.4 assists per game across seven games for Greece.

He also represented Greece at the 2019 FIBA Under-19 Basketball World Cup, averaging 9.1 points, 6.4 rebounds and 1.4 assists per game.

At the 2021 FIBA U20 European Challengers, Sotiriou averaged 11.8 points, 6.6 rebounds and 2.4 assists per game across five games for Greece.

== College statistics ==
Season	School	GP	PPG	RPG	APG
2019–20	Texas A&M–Corpus Christi	6	0.7	1.5	0.3
2022–23	Adelphi Panthers	25	8.0	3.7	1.0
