= Julian Strawther =

American basketball player (born 2002)

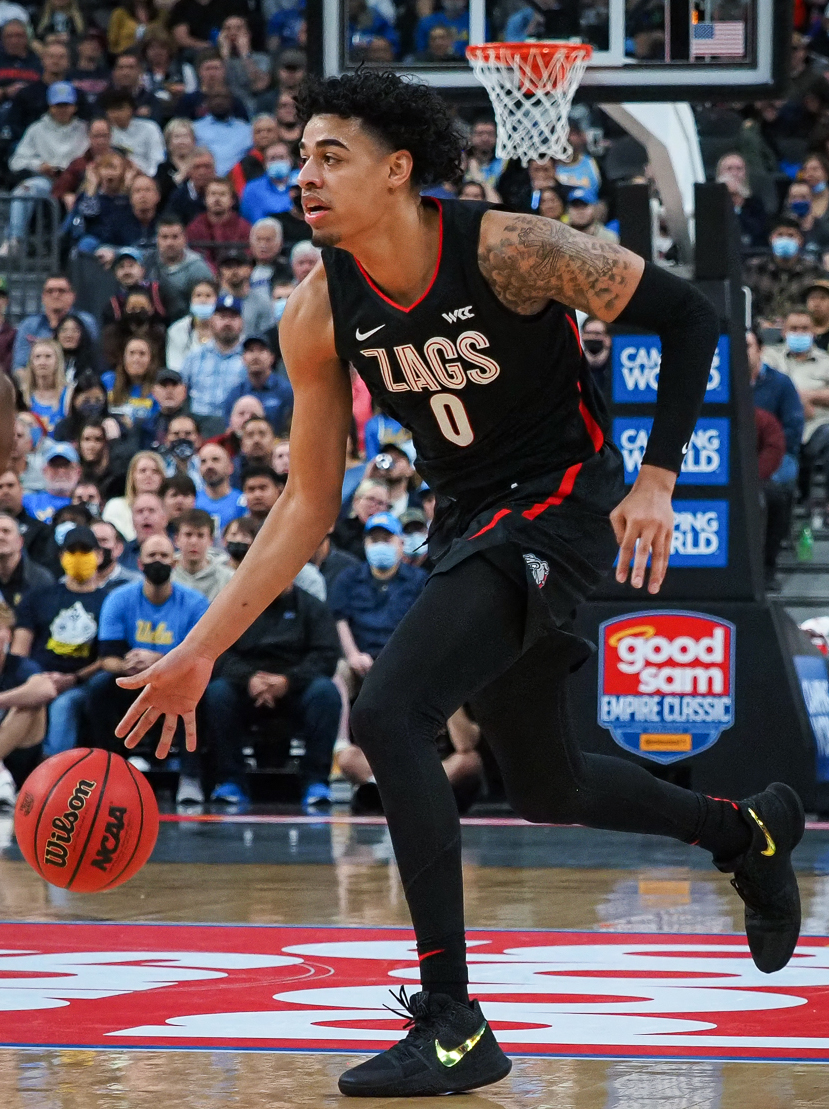
- Strawther with Gonzaga in 2021

No. 1 – Denver Nuggets
- Position: Shooting guard
- League: NBA

Personal information
- Born: April 18, 2002 (age 24) Las Vegas, Nevada, U.S.
- Listed height: 6 ft 6 in (1.98 m)
- Listed weight: 205 lb (93 kg)

Career information
- High school: Liberty (Henderson, Nevada)
- College: Gonzaga (2020–2023)
- NBA draft: 2023: 1st round, 29th overall pick
- Drafted by: Indiana Pacers
- Playing career: 2023–present

Career history
- 2023–present: Denver Nuggets
- 2024: →Grand Rapids Gold

Career highlights
- First-team All-WCC (2023)
- Stats at NBA.com
- Stats at Basketball Reference

Julian Lee Strawther-Cordero (born April 18, 2002) is an American professional basketball player for the Denver Nuggets of the National Basketball Association (NBA). He played college basketball for the Gonzaga Bulldogs.

== High school career ==
Strawther played basketball for Liberty High School in Henderson, Nevada. As a junior, he averaged 27.3 points and 8.8 rebounds per game. In his senior season, he averaged 31.5 points, 11.1 rebounds and 2.2 assists per game, earning Southeast League co-MVP honors. Strawther scored 51 points against Apollo High School at the HoopHall West Invitational, setting an event record. He left as his school's all-time leader in points and rebounds. A consensus four-star recruit, he committed to playing college basketball for Gonzaga over offers from Marquette, Florida and UNLV.

== College career ==
As a freshman at Gonzaga, Strawther averaged 3.4 points per game, serving as the backup to Corey Kispert. His team reached the national championship game. On November 15, 2021, he scored 18 points in an 84–57 win over Alcorn State. As a sophomore, Strawther averaged 11.8 points and 5.4 rebounds per game. He declared for the 2022 NBA draft following the season before ultimately returning to Gonzaga.

On January 28, 2023, Strawther scored a career-high 40 points in an 82–67 victory over Portland. In the 2023 NCAA tournament against UCLA, he made a 35-foot (11 m) basket for the lead with six seconds remaining, and Gonzaga held on for the win to advance to the quarterfinals. Strawther averaged 15.2 points, 6.2 rebounds, and 1.3 assists per game as a junior, earning First Team All-West Coast Conference honors. Following the season he declared for the 2023 NBA draft.

== Professional career ==
Strawther was selected by the Indiana Pacers with the 29th overall pick in the 2023 NBA draft. He was immediately traded to the Denver Nuggets, and he was officially signed on July 6, 2023.

Strawther became a prominent part of the Nuggets rotation during his sophomore season, averaging over 20 minutes per game. He dropped a career-high 23 points against the Philadelphia 76ers on January 21, 2025. On May 15, 2025, in the Nuggets' second-round matchup against the Oklahoma City Thunder during the 2025 playoffs, he scored a pivotal 15 points within the final 14 minutes of a game six elimination game to help keep their season alive despite their eventual game seven loss.

== National team career ==
Although a native of Las Vegas, Strawther represented Puerto Rico at the junior international level due to his mother's Puerto Rican ancestry. At the 2019 FIBA Under-19 World Cup, he averaged 22 points and 6.1 rebounds per game, helping his team finish in sixth place. He recorded 40 points, 10 rebounds and four assists in a loss to Russia in the fifth-place game.

== Career statistics ==
Legend
GP	Games played	GS	Games started	MPG	Minutes per game
FG%	Field goal percentage	3P%	3-point field goal percentage	FT%	Free throw percentage
RPG	Rebounds per game	APG	Assists per game	SPG	Steals per game
BPG	Blocks per game	PPG	Points per game	**Bold**	Career high

=== NBA ===
==== Regular season ====
Year	Team	GP	GS	MPG	FG%	3P%	FT%	RPG	APG	SPG	BPG	PPG
2023–24	Denver	50	0	10.9	.369	.297	.710	1.2	.9	.3	.1	4.5
2024–25	Denver	**65**	4	**21.3**	.432	.349	**.822**	**2.2**	**1.3**	**.6**	**.2**	**9.0**
2025–26	Denver	57	**14**	15.1	**.467**	**.387**	.814	2.0	1.1	.4	.1	7.2
Career		172	18	16.2	.429	.346	.801	1.8	1.1	.5	.2	7.1

==== Playoffs ====
Year	Team	GP	GS	MPG	FG%	3P%	FT%	RPG	APG	SPG	BPG	PPG
2024	Denver	3	0	5.3	.333	.250	.500	.7	.0	**.3**	.0	2.3
2025	Denver	**9**	0	**9.8**	**.433**	**.500**	**.857**	1.0	**.2**	.2	**.1**	**4.2**
2026	Denver	2	0	9.0	.286	.333	.500	**1.5**	.0	.0	.0	3.0
Career		14	0	8.7	.395	.421	.692	1.0	.1	.2	.1	3.6

=== College ===
Year	Team	GP	GS	MPG	FG%	3P%	FT%	RPG	APG	SPG	BPG	PPG
2020–21	Gonzaga	25	0	7.4	**.517**	.321	.696	1.2	.0	.2	.0	3.4
2021–22	Gonzaga	32	31	26.8	.498	.365	.705	5.4	1.0	.5	.2	11.8
2022–23	Gonzaga	**37**	**37**	**31.2**	.469	**.408**	**.776**	**6.2**	**1.3**	**.8**	**.4**	**15.2**
Career		94	68	23.4	.484	.384	.745	4.6	.9	.6	.2	10.9

== Personal life ==
Strawther was nine years old when his mother, Lourdes, died from breast cancer. His older sister, Paris, played college basketball for UNLV. Strawther's paternal grandfather, Edward, was a lieutenant colonel who served in World War II, and formed the Las Vegas Sentinel, one of two African-American newspapers in Nevada.
