= Kruz Perrott-Hunt =

New Zealand basketball player

No. 5 – Nelson Giants
- Position: Guard
- League: NZNBL

Personal information
- Born: 23 November 2000 (age 25) Auckland, New Zealand
- Listed height: 6 ft 3 in (1.91 m)
- Listed weight: 195 lb (88 kg)

Career information
- High school: Rosmini College (Auckland, New Zealand)
- College: South Dakota (2019–2023)
- NBA draft: 2024: undrafted
- Playing career: 2018–present

Career history
- 2018–2019: New Zealand Breakers
- 2019: Nelson Giants
- 2023: Auckland Tuatara
- 2023: KK Borac Čačak
- 2024–2025: Tauranga Whai
- 2024: Korihait
- 2024–2025: BC Komarno
- 2026–present: Nelson Giants

Career highlights
- Second-team All-Summit League (2022)
Medals
Men's basketball
Representing New Zealand
FIBA Asia Cup
Bronze medal – third place	2022 Jakarta

Kruz Ambrose Roger Perrott-Hunt (born 23 November 2000) is a New Zealand professional basketball player for the Nelson Giants of the New Zealand National Basketball League (NZNBL). He played college basketball for the South Dakota Coyotes.

== Early life and career ==
Perrott-Hunt was born in Auckland, New Zealand. He attended Rosmini College, where he won back-to-back national championships.

Perrott-Hunt joined the New Zealand Breakers of the Australian National Basketball League as a development player for the 2018–19 season. He played one game for the Breakers during the season, making his debut on 21 December 2018 against the Illawarra Hawks. He then joined the Nelson Giants of the New Zealand NBL for the 2019 season, where he averaged 9.3 points, 2.8 rebounds, 1.8 assists and 1.1 steals in 13 games.

== College career ==
Perrott-Hunt played four years of college basketball in the United States for the South Dakota Coyotes between 2019 and 2023.

As a freshman in 2019–20, Perrott-Hunt action in 22 games with seven starts and averaged 1.5 points, 9.6 minutes and 1.1 assists per game.

In 2020–21, Perrott-Hunt was one of three players to start every game, averaging 7.0 points, 2.8 rebounds and 2.2 assists in 27.6 minutes per game. He scored a season-high 16 points against Omaha on 29 January 2021.

In 2021–22, Perrott-Hunt started in all 31 games and led the team in scoring and assists with 15 points per game and 71 assists. He finished ninth in the conference in scoring, recording five 20-plus point performances including a season-high 25 against Tennessee State and Denver. He was subsequently named second-team All-Summit League. In January 2022, he reached 490 career points, moving ahead of Stan Hill into 17th spot on the all-time list of New Zealand scorers in NCAA Division I men's basketball.

In 2022–23, Perrott-Hunt played in all 31 games for the Coyotes and started 30, averaging a team-high 31 minutes per game. He led the team in scoring and ranked 12th in the conference at 14.3 points per game. He had six 20-plus scoring efforts and 23 double-digit scoring outings, becoming a member of the 1,000 point club during the season. He scored a career-high 30 points against Western Illinois on 31 December 2022. He earned All-Summit League honorable mention honours.

== Professional career ==
In April 2023, Perrott-Hunt signed with the Auckland Tuatara for the 2023 New Zealand NBL season. He initially signed to begin his professional career, but he was released in May to pursue going back to college for a final season. With that possibility not coming to fruition, Perrott-Hunt opted to return to the Tuatara in June. In nine games for the Tuatara, he averaged 6.6 points, 3.1 rebounds and 2.8 assists per game.

For the 2023–24 season, Perrott-Hunt joined KK Borac Čačak of the Serbian League. He played in only one game for Borac in the ABA League on 27 November 2023 against KK Partizan.

In March 2024, Perrott-Hunt signed with the Tauranga Whai for the 2024 New Zealand NBL season. In 20 games, he averaged 13.0 points, 3.7 rebounds and 2.3 assists per game.

In August 2024, Perrott-Hunt signed with Korihait of the Finnish Korisliiga. He appeared in seven games for Korihait before joining BC Komarno of the Slovak Basketball League in November 2024. He was cut by Komarno on 4 January 2025 after appearing in eight games.

In February 2025, Perrott-Hunt re-signed with the Tauranga Whai for the 2025 New Zealand NBL season. In 23 games, he averaged 14.6 points, 3.8 rebounds, 3.0 assists and 1.1 steals per game.

In January 2026, Perrott-Hunt signed with Nelson Giants for the 2026 New Zealand NBL season.

== National team career ==
Perrott-Hunt played for the New Zealand Junior Tall Blacks at the 2017 FIBA Under-17 Oceania Championship, 2018 FIBA U18 Asian Championship, and 2019 FIBA Under-19 Basketball World Cup.

Perrott-Hunt debuted for the senior New Zealand national team, the Tall Blacks, during the 2019 FIBA Basketball World Cup Asian qualifiers. He played for the Tall Blacks at the 2022 FIBA Asia Cup, where he averaged 8.7 points, 3.9 rebounds and 1.9 assists in seven games.

In February 2026, Perrott-Hunt joined the Tall Blacks during the FIBA Basketball World Cup 2027 Asian Qualifiers.
