= Lietuvos moksleivių krepšinio lyga =

Lithuanian youth basketball league

Lithuanian Pupils Basketball League Lietuvos moksleivių krepšinio lyga (MKL)
- Current season, competition or edition: 2015–16 MKL season
- Sport: Basketball
- Director: Martynas Račkauskas
- No. of teams: Men's: 59; Women's: 21
- Country: Lithuania
- Continent: (European Union) FIBA Europe (Europe)
- Broadcaster: SportoTV.lt
- Website: www.mkl.lt

Lietuvos moksleivių krepšinio lyga (MKL) (English: Lithuanian Pupils Basketball League) is the Lithuanian boys' and girls' pupils basketball league. The league is divided into 12 age-based categories, starting from Under-12 (First Challenge) and ending with Under-19 (Olympic Cup). Chocolate bars producer Manija is the general sponsor of the league.

== Schools ranking ==
=== TOP 10 boy's schools ===
Ranking	School	Points
1	Šarūno Marčiulionio krepšinio akademija	463.50
2	Sabonio krepšinio centras	335.25
3	Kauno krepšinio mokykla „Aisčiai"	278.75
4	Vilniaus krepšinio mokykla	278.75
5	Klaipėdos Vlado Knašiaus krepšinio mokykla	267.25
6	Kauno krepšinio mokykla „Tornado"	164.25
7	Kauno krepšinio mokykla „Perkūnas"	140.00
8	Panevėžio kūno kultūros ir sporto centras	123.50
9	Krepšinio akademija „Saulė"	121.75
10	„Sostinės" krepšinio mokykla	109.75

Last updated: 2015-08-17.

=== TOP 10 girl's schools ===
Ranking	School	Points
1	Kauno krepšinio mokykla „Aisčiai"	265.75
2	Vilniaus krepšinio mokykla	247.00
3	Klaipėdos Vlado Knašiaus krepšinio mokykla	111.00
4	Panevėžio kūno kultūros ir sporto centras	94.00
5	Marijampolės žaidimų sporto mokykla	77.50
6	Alytaus sporto ir rekreacijos centras	66.50
7	Kėdainių sporto centras	59.50
8	Biržų sporto mokykla	58.00
9	Plungės sporto ir rekreacijos centras	43.25
10	Krepšinio akademija „Saulė"	31.25

Last updated: 2015-08-17.
