= Zois Karampelas =

Greek basketball player

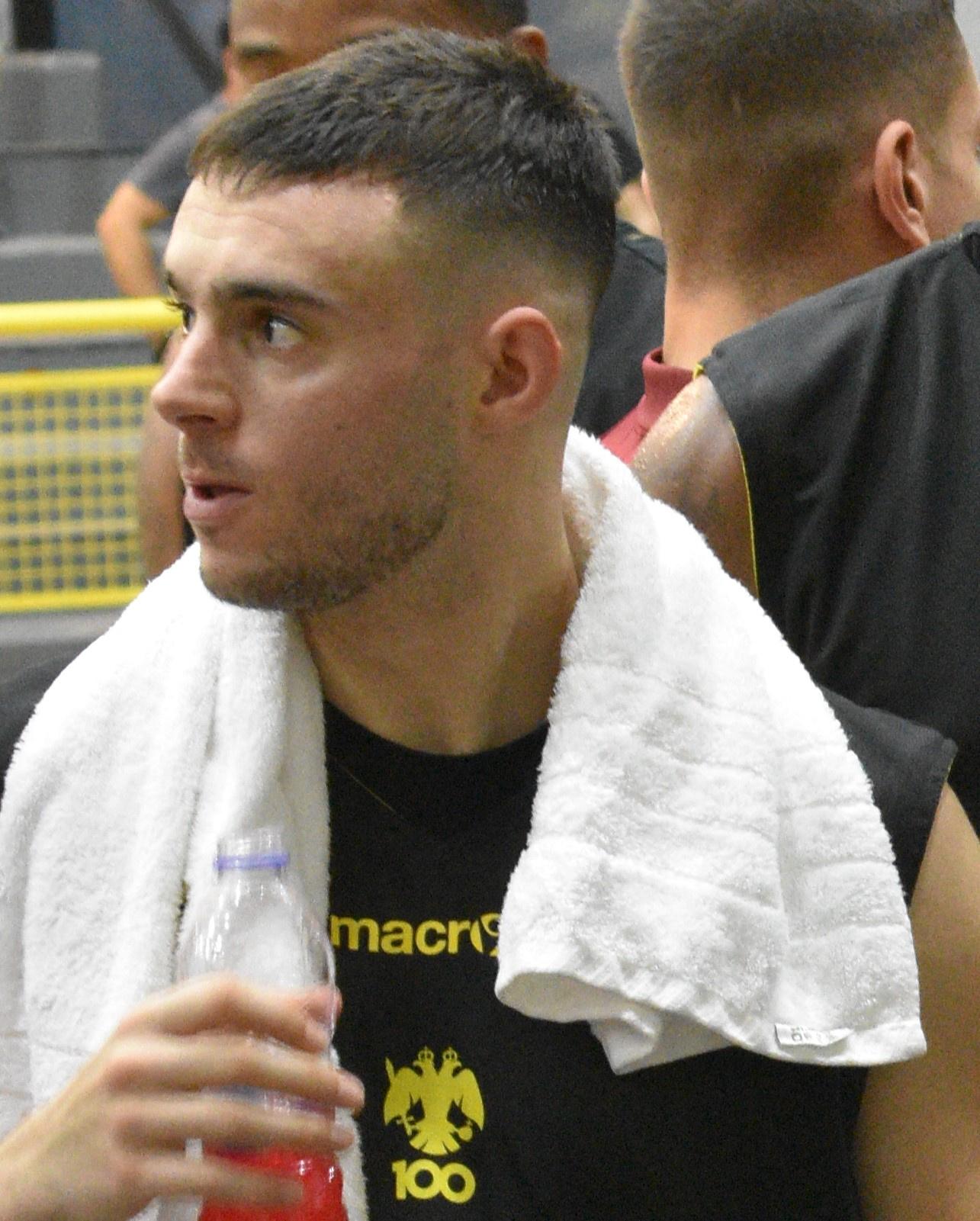
- Karampelas in 2023

No. 4 – Kolossos Rodou
- Position: Point guard
- League: Greek Basketball League

Personal information
- Born: April 27, 2001 (age 25) Athens, Greece
- Listed height: 6 ft 1.25 in (1.86 m)
- Listed weight: 180 lb (82 kg)

Career information
- Playing career: 2017–present

Career history
- 2016-2018: Doukas
- 2017–2021: Peristeri
- 2021–2022: Larisa
- 2022–2025: AEK Athens
- 2022–2023: →Apollon Patras
- 2025–present: Kolossos Rodou

Career highlights
- Greek League Best Young Player (2019)

Zois Karampelas (Greek: Ζώης Καράμπελας, born April 27, 2001) is a Greek professional basketball player for Kolossos Rodou of the Greek Basketball League. He plays at the point guard position.

== Professional career ==
Karampelas began his pro career in the Greek 2nd Division with Peristeri, in the 2017–18 season. He debuted in Greece's top-tier level, in the 2018–19 season, with Peristeri, in a game against Holargos. He was named the Greek League Best Young Player, of the 2018–19 season.

On July 17, 2021, Karampelas moved to Larisa, under his former coach Nikos Papanikolopoulos. In 35 league games, he averaged 5.3 points, 2.7 rebounds and 2.9 assists in 20 minutes per contest.

On August 15, 2022, Karampelas signed a three-year contract with AEK Athens and was subsequently loaned to Apollon Patras for the first season. In 22 league games, he averaged 6.9 points, 2.9 rebounds, 4.5 assists and 1.1 steals in 24 minutes per contest. On May 2, 2023, Karampelas returned to AEK.

On July 9, 2025, Karampelas joined Kolossos Rodou of the GBL.

== National team career ==
Karampelas has been a member of the Greek junior national teams. With Greece's youth national teams, he played at the 2018 FIBA Under-18 European Championship, and at the 2019 FIBA Under-19 World Cup.
