= Nikos Arsenopoulos =

Greek basketball player (born 2000)

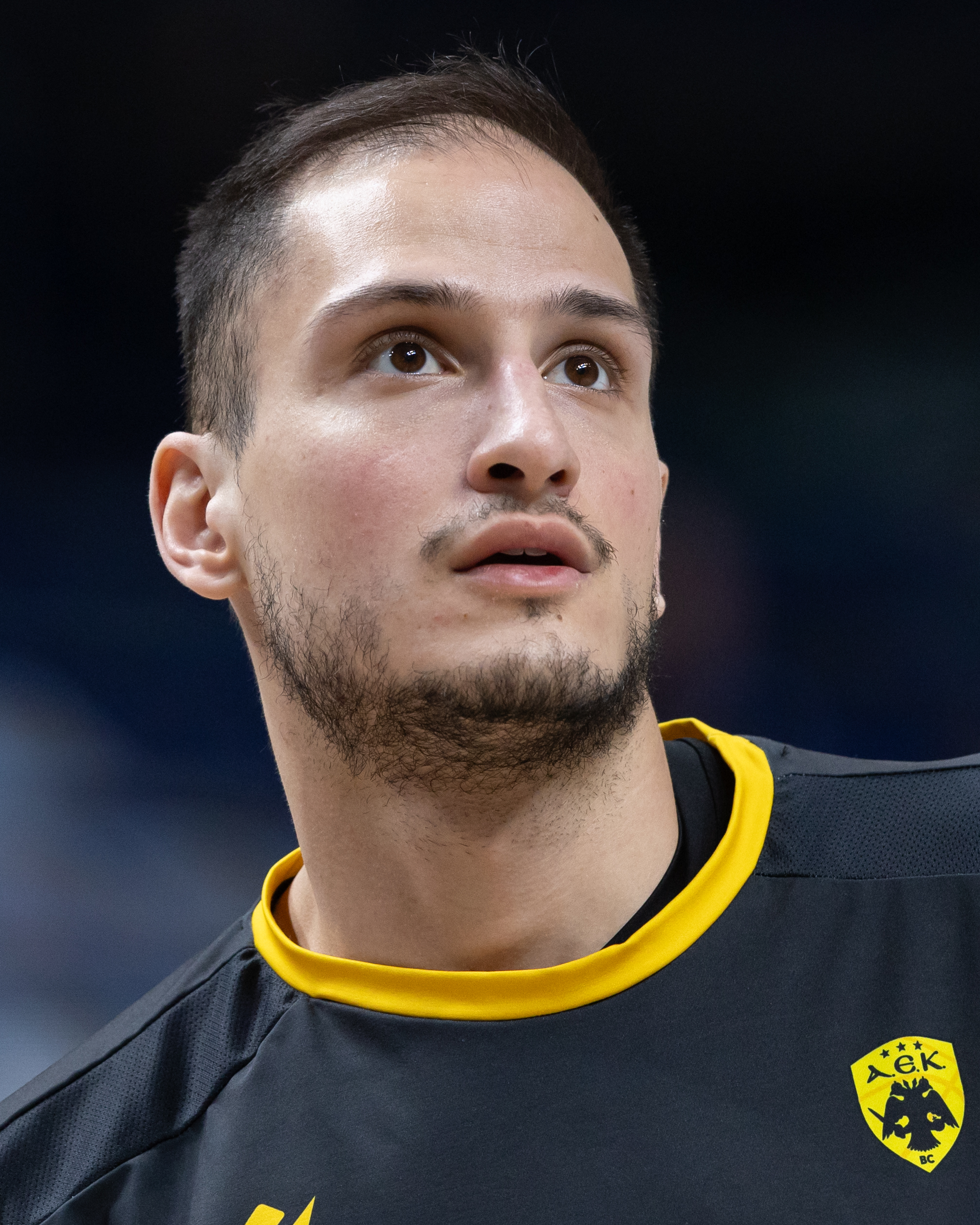
- Arsenopoulos in action with AEK B.C. in 2026

No. 7 – Doxa Lefkadas
- Position: Shooting guard / small forward
- League: GBL

Personal information
- Born: May 19, 2000 (age 26) Maroussi, Greece
- Listed height: 6 ft 6 in (1.98 m)
- Listed weight: 200 lb (91 kg)

Career information
- Playing career: 2017–present

Career history
- 2017–2020: Olympiacos
- 2018–2019: →Psychiko
- 2019–2020: →Olympiacos B
- 2020–2021: Kolossos Rodou
- 2021–2023: Ionikos Nikaias
- 2023–2024: PAOK Thessaloniki
- 2024–2025: CD Póvoa
- 2025–2026: AEK Athens
- 2026–present: Doxa Lefkadas

Nikolaos Arsenopoulos (Greek: Νικόλαος "Νίκος" Αρσενόπουλος; born May 19, 2000) is a Greek professional basketball player for Doxa Lefkadas of the GBL. He is a 1.98-metre (6 ft 6 in) tall and 91-kilogram (201 lb) swingman.

== Professional career ==
In the summer of 2016, Arsenopoulos joined the Greek Basket League and EuroLeague club Olympiacos, when he signed a 6-year contract with the club. He spent the 2016–17 season playing with the junior clubs of Olympiacos. He then made his pro debut during the Greek Basket League's 2017–18 season.

On September 11, 2018, Arsenopoulos was loaned to Psychiko, of the Greek 2nd Division, for the 2018–19 season. He played with Olympiacos' reserve team, Olympiacos B, in the Greek 2nd Division's 2019–20 season. On August 4, 2020, Arsenopoulos was released from the parent club of Olympiacos.

On August 27, 2020, Arsenopoulos signed with Kolossos Rodou.

On August 18, 2021, Arsenopoulos moved to Ionikos Nikaias. In 19 league games, he averaged 7.2 points, 1.4 rebounds and 0.5 assists in 18 minutes per contest. On September 5, 2022, he renewed his contract with Ionikos. In 21 league games, he averaged 7.4 points, 2.2 rebounds and 1.5 assists in 23 minutes per contest.

On July 31, 2023, Arsenopoulos signed with PAOK.

For the 2024–25 season, Arsenopoulos joined Povoa in Portugal. On February 21, 2025, Arsenopoulos joined AEK Athens.

== National team career ==
Arsenopoulos has been a member of the Greek junior national teams. With Greece's junior national teams, he played at the 2016 FIBA Europe Under-16 Championship, the 2017 FIBA Europe Under-18 Championship, the 2018 FIBA Europe Under-18 Championship, and the 2019 FIBA Under-19 World Cup.
