= Artūrs Kurucs =

Latvian basketball player (born 2000)

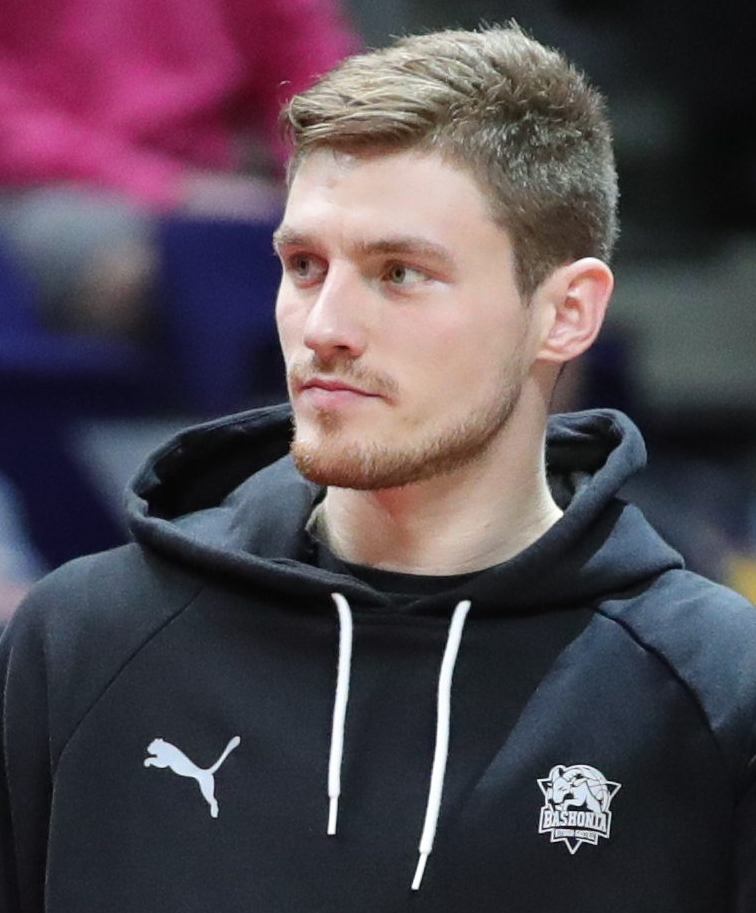
- Kurucs in 2023

No. 47 – La Laguna Tenerife
- Position: Point guard / shooting guard
- League: Liga ACB; EuroCup

Personal information
- Born: 19 January 2000 (age 26) Cēsis, Latvia
- Listed height: 6 ft 4 in (1.93 m)
- Listed weight: 191 lb (87 kg)

Career information
- Playing career: 2015–present

Career history
- 2015–2019: Fundación 5+11
- 2017–2023: Baskonia
- 2019–2020: →VEF Rīga
- 2023: Promitheas Patras
- 2023–2025: UCAM Murcia
- 2025–2026: Breogán
- 2026–present: La Laguna Tenerife

Career highlights
- Liga ACB champion (2020); LBL champion (2020)

Artūrs Kurucs (born 19 January 2000) is a Latvian professional basketball player for La Laguna Tenerife of the Spanish Liga ACB and the EuroCup. At 1.93 meters tall, his natural position on the field is at guard.

== Professional career ==
On December 5, 2023, he signed with UCAM Murcia of the Liga ACB. Kurucs parted ways with Murcia in January 2025 after reaching an agreement to terminate his contract.

On January 17, 2025, he signed with Río Breogán of the Liga ACB.

On August 13, 2026, he signed with La Laguna Tenerife of the Liga ACB and the EuroCup.

== National team career ==
Kurucs has represented the Latvian national team internationally, making his debut during the EuroBasket 2022 qualification games.

== Personal life ==
Kurucs' older brother, Rodions, is also a professional basketball player, currently for Baskonia.
