= Erikas Venskus =

Lithuanian basketball player

No. 21 – Šiauliai
- Position: Power forward / center
- League: LKL; EuroCup

Personal information
- Born: 28 May 2000 (age 26) Biržai, Lithuania
- Listed height: 2.05 m (6 ft 9 in)
- Listed weight: 100 kg (220 lb)

Career information
- NBA draft: 2022: undrafted
- Playing career: 2014–present

Career history
- 2014–2017: BC Biržai
- 2017–2021: Žalgiris Kaunas
- 2017–2020: → Žalgiris-2 Kaunas
- 2020–2021: → Lietkabelis Panevėžys
- 2021–2022: Labas GAS Prienai
- 2022–2023: ZZ Leiden
- 2023–2024: Spirou Charleroi
- 2024–2025: CBet Jonava
- 2025–2026: Juventus Utena
- 2026–present: Šiauliai

Career highlights
- BNXT League champion (2023); Dutch Cup winner (2023); 2× Lithuanian LKL champion (2019, 2020); King Mindaugas Cup winner (2020)
Medals
Men's basketball
Representing Lithuania
FIBA U16 European Championship
Silver medal – second place	2016 Poland	Team
FIBA U18 European Championship
Bronze medal – third place	2017 Slovakia	Team

Erikas Venskus (born 28 May 2000) is a Lithuanian professional basketball player for Šiauliai of the Lithuanian Basketball League (LKL) and the EuroCup.

== Early life ==
Venskus started playing basketball with BC Biržai at age 14.

== Professional career ==
His professional career started by signing with hometown Biržai club in RKL. In 2017, he signed with Žalgiris where he primarily played for the club's under-18 team. On 28 December 2018, Venskus made his EuroLeague debut when he played 2.5 minutes in an away loss in Gran Canaria.

On 4 September 2021, Venskus signed with BC Prienai.

On 8 August 2022, Venskus signed a one-year contract with ZZ Leiden of the BNXT League. On 12 March 2023, he won the Dutch Basketball Cup with Leiden after defeating Landstede Hammers in the final.

On 3 August 2023, Venskus signed with Spirou of the BNXT League.

On 6 August 2024, Venskus signed with CBet Jonava of the Lithuanian Basketball League (LKL).

On July 8 2025, he moved from CBet Jonava to the Juventus Utena club of the Lithuanian Basketball League (LKL).

On June 17 2026, Venskus signed with Šiauliai of the Lithuanian Basketball League (LKL) and the EuroCup.

== National team career ==
Venskus played for the Lithuania under-19 team at the 2019 FIBA U18 European Championship where he averaged 12.9 points and 7.3 rebounds.
