= 2014 FIBA Africa Under-18 Championship squads =

This article displays the rosters for the participating teams at the 2014 FIBA Africa Under-18 Championship.

== Angola ==
Angola men's national U18 basketball team – 2014 FIBA Africa Championship – 4th place roster
Players
Coaches

Pos.	No.	Name	Age – Date of birth	Height	Club	Ctr.
G	4	Simão Lutonda	18 – 10 March 1996	1.87 m (6 ft 2 in)	Petro de Luanda
G	5	Gerson Domingos	18 – 16 April 1996	1.81 m (5 ft 11 in)	Vila Clotilde
F	6	Júlio Cambudi	18 – 2 April 1996	1.86 m (6 ft 1 in)	1º de Agosto
F	7	António Congo	18 – 28 July 1996	1.97 m (6 ft 6 in)	Petro de Luanda
F	8	Bruno Neves	18 – 8 April 1996	1.96 m (6 ft 5 in)	Sporting de Benguela
F	9	Aldaír Carlos	18 – 4 May 1996	1.88 m (6 ft 2 in)	Lausanne Lynx
C	10	José Neto	17 – 20 September 1996	1.97 m (6 ft 6 in)	Sporting de Benguela
C	11	Ayrton Dala	18 – 6 January 1996	1.98 m (6 ft 6 in)	Interclube
C	12	Martinho Paulo	17 – 17 August 1996	1.95 m (6 ft 5 in)	Petro de Luanda
F	13	Gerson Gonçalves	18 – 29 March 1996	1.91 m (6 ft 3 in)	Petro de Luanda
C	14	Dilson da Piedade	16 – 29 November 1997	2.03 m (6 ft 8 in)	1º de Agosto
C	15	Moisés César	17 – 7 April 1997	2.00 m (6 ft 7 in)	Sporting de Benguela

Head coach

- Carlos Dinis

Assistant coach

- Jacinto Olim

Legend

- (C) Team captain
- nat field describes country

== Benin ==
Benin national U18 basketball team – 2014 FIBA Africa Championship – 8th place roster
Players
Coaches

Pos.	No.	Name	Age – Date of birth	Height	Club	Ctr.
	4	Aaron Avocetien	17 – 8 July 1997
	5	Donald Savi	17 – 15 July 1997
	6	Mohamadou Baboni	17 – 15 November 1996
	7	Adéshoukou Odou	18 – 10 June 1996
	8	Kouessivi Kokou	18 – 22 April 1996
	9	Romuald Chicou	17 – 9 June 1997
	10	Adnane Imorou	17 – 26 December 1996
	11	Ezin Delidji	18 – 22 June 1996
	13	Maman Yaou	17 – 11 August 1996
	14	Nasser Mamadjibril	16 – 2 December 1997
	15	Soulémane Chabi Yo	18 – 3 January 1996

Head coach

Assistant coach

Legend

- (C) Team captain
- Club field describes current club

== Egypt ==
Egypt men's national U18 basketball team – 2014 FIBA Africa Championship – Gold Medal roster
Players
Coaches

Pos.	No.	Name	Age – Date of birth	Height	Club	Ctr.
	4	Ahmed Mahmoud	17 – 20 August 1996
	5	Mamdouh Elkaft	18 – 3 January 1996
	6	Basem Alian	18 – 1 January 1996
	7	Kareem Aly	17 – 24 October 1996
	8	Mahmoud Mahmoud	18 – 3 April 1996
	9	Mohamed Mohamed	18 – 6 July 1996
	10	Abdelrahman Mohamed	18 – 2 January 1996
	11	Ahmed Elsayed	18 – 6 January 1996
	12	Karim Azab	17 – 1 October 1996
	13	Bassam Hassan	18 – 28 May 1996
	14	Mohamed Youssef	18 – 31 January 1996
	15	Mohamed Mohamed	18 – 18 July 1996

Head coach

- (Serbia) Jemc Branislav

Assistant coach

Legend

- (C) Team captain
- Club field describes current club

== Gabon ==
Gabon men's national U18 basketball team – 2014 FIBA Africa Championship – 9th place roster
Players
Coaches

Pos.	No.	Name	Age – Date of birth	Height	Club	Ctr.
	4	Jeriel Tgana	16 – 4 November 1997
	5	Armel Rendambo	18 – 21 March 1996
	6	Aymerick Rogandji	18 – 27 July 1996
	7	Mahony N'dui	17 – 21 July 1997
	8	Brandon Mba	17 – 28 January 1997
	9	Stephanel Sarahn	17 – 9 April 1997
	10	Emmanuel Nguema	17 – 28 April 1997
	11	Henri Megne	18 – 27 May 1996
	12	Farid Akinocho	18 – 13 July 1996
	13	Yves Aworet	17 – 7 June 1997
	14	Channick Nkoma	16 – 27 December 1997
	15	Didier Maganga	17 – 7 April 1997

Head coach

Assistant coach

Legend

- (C) Team captain
- Club field describes current club

== Ivory Coast ==
Ivory Coast men's national U18 basketball team – 2014 FIBA Africa Championship – 6th place roster
Players
Coaches

Pos.	No.	Name	Age – Date of birth	Height	Club	Ctr.
	4	Henri Lath	15 – 23 January 1997
	5	Hamadou Sylla	16 – 27 May 1996
	6	Bessé M'Bouke	15 – 30 May 1997
	7	Paul Tito	16 – 16 April 1996
	8	Gnonlo Diarrassouba	15 – 2 December 1996
	9	Sékpéou Ouinsou	16 – 8 February 1996
	10	Gnahore Guede	14 – 17 October 1997
	11	Yacouba Sanogo	16 – 16 April 1996
	12	Kigninlman Kone	15 – 21 March 1997
	13	Amine Toure	15 – 30 December 1996
	14	Sahié Kuo	16 – 23 June 1996	2.01 m (6 ft 7 in)
	15	Amboudou Karaboue	16 – 19 March 1996	1.85 m (6 ft 1 in)

Head coach

- (Ivory Coast) Olivier Tea

Assistant coach

- (Ivory Coast) Lazare Bouabre

Legend

- (C) Team captain
- Club field describes current club

== Madagascar ==
Madagascar men's national U18 basketball team – 2014 FIBA Africa Championship – 5th place roster
Players
Coaches

Pos.	No.	Name	Age – Date of birth	Height	Club	Ctr.
	4	Yann Rakotomalala	18 – 3 April 1996
	5	Mmadi Rakotoson	18 – 10 August 1996
	6	Livio Ratianarivo	18 – 24 April 1996
	7	Jean Rakotomiaramanana	18 – 10 April 1996
	8	Kiady Razanamahenina	17 – 15 December 1996
	9	Brillant Tsiaraso	18 – 8 June 1996
	10	Orlando Rahajaniaina	17 – 18 June 1997
	11	Elly Randriamampionona	17 – 20 July 1997
	12	Eddy Ramanampisoa	17 – 21 January 1997
	13	Ny Ranaivomanana	18 – 4 March 1996
	14	Kevin Gilbert	17 – 22 November 1996
	15	Kiady Rabarijoelina	17 – 16 May 1997

Head coach

- Angel Manjano

Assistant coach

- Mamy Herilanto

Legend

- (C) Team captain
- Club field describes current club

== Mali ==
Mali men's national U18 basketball team – 2014 FIBA Africa Championship – Bronze Medal roster
Players
Coaches

Pos.	No.	Name	Age – Date of birth	Height	Club	Ctr.
	4	Modibo Diarra	16 – 1 October 1997
	5	Tiémoko Sangaré	17 – 11 October 1996
	6	Aboubacar Doucoure	17 – 10 August 1997
	7	N'faly Kanouté	17 – 2 December 1996
	8	Mohamed Konate	18 – 12 May 1996
	9	Modibo Dembele	17 – 11 December 1996
	10	Makan Coulibaly	17 – 4 September 1996
	11	Lassine Mounkoro	16 – 15 October 1997
	12	Mohamed Pare	17 – 1 November 1996
	13	Moriba Sissoko	16 – 10 September 1997
	14	Mamoudou Diarra	16 – 4 October 1997
	15	Sagaba Konate	16 – 19 September 1997

Head coach

- (Mali) Kaba Kante

Assistant coach

- (Mali) Adam Diakite

Legend

- (C) Team captain
- Club field describes current club

== Mozambique ==
Mozambique men's national U18 basketball team – 2014 FIBA Africa Championship – 7th place roster
Players
Coaches

Pos.	No.	Name	Age – Date of birth	Height	Club	Ctr.
	4	Joaquim Chuma	17 – 8 August 1997
	5	Helénio de Melo	16 – 24 August 1997
	6	Mauro Marques	17 – 21 March 1997
	7	Klaus Bunguele	18 – 1 April 1996
	8	Mirlon Paruque	18 – 22 June 1996
	9	Yuran Temane	17 – 15 October 1996
	10	Ayad Munguambe	18 – 29 June 1996
	11	Tomás Fijamo	17 – 24 September 1996
	12	Vitorino Júnior	18 – 21 January 1996
	13	Tuyo Albino	18 – 18 March 1996
	14	Loren Langa	17 – 7 June 1997
	15	Titos Benjamin	17 – 25 March 1997

Head coach

- (Mozambique) Gerson Novela

Assistant coach

- (Mozambique) Amândio Zefanis

Legend

- (C) Team captain
- Club field describes current club

== Tunisia ==
Tunisia men's national U18 basketball team – 2014 FIBA Africa Championship - Silver Medal roster
Players
Coaches

Pos.	No.	Name	Age – Date of birth	Height	Club	Ctr.
	4	Ghassen Madjoub	18 – 27 February 1996
	5	Monem Soltani	18 – 28 May 1996
	6	Achref Gannouni	17 – 16 April 1997
	7	Firas Fatnassi	18 – 3 January 1996
	8	Ahmad Dhif	17 – 17 September 1996
	9	Jaouhar Jaouadi	17 – 14 July 1997
	10	Fedi Dallai	18 – 31 March 1996
	11	Mahmoud Hajri	17 – 17 February 1997
	12	Ahmed Addami	17 – 14 July 1997
	13	Younes Saidani	17 – 12 January 1997
	14	Abdelaziz Hadiden	18 – 11 April 1996
	15	Hassen Jendoubi	17 – 6 June 1997

Head coach

- Sofiane Mrabet

Assistant coach

- Foued Mestiri

Legend

- (C) Team captain
- Club field describes current club

== See also ==
- 2013 FIBA Africa Under-16 Championship squads
