= 2012 FIBA Africa Under-18 Championship squads =

This article displays the rosters for the participating teams at the 2012 FIBA Africa Under-18 Championship.

== Angola ==
Angola men's national U18 basketball team – 2012 FIBA Africa Championship – 5th place roster
Players
Coaches

Pos.	No.	Name	Age – Date of birth	Height	Club	Ctr.
	4	Reginaldo Kanza	18 – 10 May 1994	1.99 m (6 ft 6 in)	1º de Agosto	(Angola)
	5	José Kipanda	17 – 26 June 1995	1.88 m (6 ft 2 in)	1º de Agosto	(Angola)
	6	Ivanádio Menezes	18 – 23 March 1994	1.91 m (6 ft 3 in)	1º de Agosto	(Angola)
	7	Joel Francisco	17 – 11 March 1995	1.92 m (6 ft 4 in)	Petro Atlético	(Angola)
	8	Joaquim Pedro	17 – 9 February 1995	1.76 m (5 ft 9 in)	Petro Atlético	(Angola)
	9	Joel Domingos	17 – 19 December 1994	1.96 m (6 ft 5 in)	1º de Agosto	(Angola)
	10	Fernando Kambuando	16 – 20 October 1995	1.94 m (6 ft 4 in)	1º de Agosto	(Angola)
	11	Teotónio Dó	18 – 20 March 1994	2.04 m (6 ft 8 in)	1º de Agosto	(Angola)
	12	Francisco Mieze	17 – 30 December 1994	2.02 m (6 ft 8 in)	Vila Clotilde	(Angola)
	13	Carlos Cabral	17 – 18 August 1995	1.88 m (6 ft 2 in)	1º de Agosto	(Angola)
	15	Joel Fernandes	18 – 6 May 1994	2.02 m (6 ft 8 in)	Petro Atlético	(Angola)

Head coach

- (Angola) Elvino Dias

Assistant coach

- (Angola) Joaquim Pinto

Legend

- (C) Team captain
- nat field describes country

== Egypt ==
Egypt men's national U18 basketball team – 2012 FIBA Africa Championship – Bronze Medal roster
Players
Coaches

Pos.	No.	Name	Age – Date of birth	Height	Club	Ctr.
	4	Romeh Ali	18 – 30 May 1994
G	5	Omar Mohamed	18 – 5 July 1994	1.83 m (6 ft 0 in)
	6	Sif Nadi	18 – 1 June 1994
G	7	Ehab Amin	17 – 1 August 1995	1.85 m (6 ft 1 in)
	8	Abdelrahman Soliman	18 – 8 March 1994
	9	Ziad Fakhry	18 – 19 June 1994
	10	Ahmed Farag	17 – 21 February 1995
	11	Ali Moatez	–
	12	Mohamed Ahmed	18 – 14 July 1994
	13	Anas Mahmoud	17 – 9 May 1995
F	14	Hassan Ahmed	18 – 1 January 1994	2.04 m (6 ft 8 in)
	15	Mohamed Elsayed	–

Head coach

Assistant coach

Legend

- (C) Team captain
- Club field describes current club

== Gabon ==
Gabon men's national U18 basketball team – 2012 FIBA Africa Championship – 7th place roster
Players
Coaches

Pos.	No.	Name	Age – Date of birth	Height	Club	Ctr.
	4	Herbert Mdundanga	–
	5	Glenn Moussouami	–
	6	Loyd Sima	–
	7	Berthol Ondo	–
	8	Wilfred Ongomou	–
	9	Eliot Landji	–
	10	Junior Messi	–
	11	Axe Ossami	–
	12	Junior Mindjoudi	–
	13	Hamia Mbongo	–
	14	Chris Ndokouedi	–
	15	Rodrigues Neda	–

Head coach

- Nguimbi Hugues

Assistant coach

- Mboumba Patrick

Legend

- (C) Team captain
- Club field describes current club

== Ghana ==
Ghana men's national U18 basketball team – 2012 FIBA Africa Championship – 8th place roster
Players
Coaches

Pos.	No.	Name	Age – Date of birth	Height	Club	Ctr.
	4	Cyril Bansah	17 – 25 June 1995
	5	Stephen Gadu	17 – 11 September 1994
	6	Riyazudeen Adams	18 – 28 April 1994
	8	Cyril Clarke	18 – 4 April 1994
	9	Abdul Alhassan	18 – 15 May 1994
	10	Gibril Dada	18 – 26 February 1994
	11	Julian Morgan	17 – 18 October 1994
	12	Abubakari Suleman	18 – 5 March 1994
	14	Daniel Ayarna	18 – 28 June 1994

Head coach

- (Ghana) S.Okine

Assistant coach

- (Ghana) K.Falconer

Legend

- (C) Team captain
- Club field describes current club

== Ivory Coast ==
Ivory Coast men's national U18 basketball team – 2012 FIBA Africa Championship – Silver Medal roster
Players
Coaches

Pos.	No.	Name	Age – Date of birth	Height	Club	Ctr.
	4	Abdoul Sanogo	16 – 29 November 1995	1.92 m (6 ft 4 in)
	5	Alpha Touré	18 – 10 July 1994	1.86 m (6 ft 1 in)
	6	Desiré Momblé	18 – 1 January 1994	1.96 m (6 ft 5 in)
	7	Aziz Fofana	16 – 15 October 1995	1.89 m (6 ft 2 in)
	8	Blaise Kouakou	18 – 23 May 1994	1.87 m (6 ft 2 in)
	9	Cédric Bah	18 – 11 May 1994	2.06 m (6 ft 9 in)
	10	Anselme Otto	18 – 3 March 1994	1.87 m (6 ft 2 in)
	11	Jean Ouraga	16 – 10 December 1995	2.00 m (6 ft 7 in)
	12	Dalen Traore	16 – 12 December 1995	2.03 m (6 ft 8 in)
	13	Joseph Kouhiboni	17 – 21 August 1995	1.83 m (6 ft 0 in)
	14	Ismael Méité	16 – 16 December 1995	1.87 m (6 ft 2 in)
	15	Kehasson Oulai	16 – 20 October 1995	1.95 m (6 ft 5 in)

Head coach

- (Ivory Coast) Blaise Amalabian

Assistant coach

- (Ivory Coast) Germain Koabinan
- (Ivory Coast) Lazare Gbogou

Legend

- (C) Team captain
- Club field describes current club

== Mali ==
Mali men's national U18 basketball team – 2012 FIBA Africa Championship – 4th place roster
Players
Coaches

Pos.	No.	Name	Age – Date of birth	Height	Club	Ctr.
F	5	Lassine Diallo	16 – 11 October 1995	1.88 m (6 ft 2 in)
	6	Bampara Kouyaté	18 – 23 July 1994
	8	Ibrahima Guindo	18 – 4 January 1994
	9	Boubacar Coulibaly	16 – 4 September 1995
	10	Mamadou Diawara	18 – 18 May 1994
	11	Mohamed Drame	17 – 15 February 1995
	12	Boubacar Sidibe	17 – 8 September 1994
	13	Mohamed Traore	17 – 26 March 1995
	14	Ibrahim Ouattara	18 – 11 January 1994
	15	Bourama Doumbia	16 – 19 September 1995

Head coach

- (Mali) Z.Coulibaly

Assistant coach

Legend

- (C) Team captain
- Club field describes current club

== Morocco ==
Morocco men's national U18 basketball team – 2012 FIBA Africa Championship – 9th place roster
Players
Coaches

Pos.	No.	Name	Age – Date of birth	Height	Club	Ctr.
	4	M Hanine	–
	5	Mourad Shifi	–
	6	Y Belmahjoub	–
	7	Badredinne Azouga	–
	8	F Taleb	–
	9	Z Merjane	–
	10	K El Ahmer	–
	11	M Belhaddar	–
	12	M El Marchi	–
	13	A El Kannouwni	–
	14	M Benbanazza	–
	15	O El Cunma	–

Head coach

- (Morocco) Mustapha Chiba

Assistant coach

- (Morocco) A Menhounhe

Legend

- (C) Team captain
- Club field describes current club

== Mozambique ==
Mozambique men's national U18 basketball team – 2012 FIBA Africa Championship – 7th place roster
Players
Coaches

Pos.	No.	Name	Age – Date of birth	Height	Club	Ctr.
	4	France Ngoque	18 – 4 April 1994
F	5	Yuri Chambal	17 – 16 July 1995	1.89 m (6 ft 2 in)
F	6	Hugo Martins	17 – 12 March 1995	1.90 m (6 ft 3 in)
C	7	Castro Vilanculos	16 – 18 December 1995	2.04 m (6 ft 8 in)
	8	Teodoro Malança	17 – 16 October 1994
C	9	Helton Ubisse	17 – 31 January 1995	1.96 m (6 ft 5 in)
	10	Jonas Faduco	17 – 8 October 1994
	11	Carlos Chirindza	18 – 19 August 1994
	12	Nelo Nducuia	17 – 3 December 1994
	13	Govino Nangilal	16 – 26 November 1995	1.85 m (6 ft 1 in)
	14	Jorge Tomé	18 – 31 May 1994
	15	Palacio Sieco	17 – 3 February 1995

Head coach

- (Mozambique) Rui Rafael

Assistant coach

Legend

- (C) Team captain
- Club field describes current club

== Rwanda ==
Rwanda men's national U18 basketball team – 2012 FIBA Africa Championship – 11th place roster
Players
Coaches

Pos.	No.	Name	Age – Date of birth	Height	Club	Ctr.
	4	Nestor Manzi	17 – 4 December 1994
	5	Ali Kazingufu	16 – 29 December 1995
	6	Mohamed Rafiki	17 – 4 July 1995
	7	Fabrice Ruterana	16 – 19 November 1995
	8	Niyomugabo Munyandamutsa	17 – 13 March 1995
	9	Olivier Shyaka	17 – 14 August 1995
	10	Erwin Loop	18 – 15 February 1994
	11	Pascal Rurangirwa	17 – 1 December 1994
	12	Eric Ngenzi	17 – 31 August 1994
	13	Sankana Uwimana	17 – 2 August 1995
	14	Pascal Niyonkuru	17 – 1 January 1995
	15	Jean Paul Ndoli	17 – 30 April 1995

Head coach

- (Croatia) Nenad Amanović

Assistant coaches

- (Rwanda) C.Calima
- (Rwanda) Na.Buake

Legend

- (C) Team captain
- Club field describes current club

== Senegal ==
Senegal men's national U18 basketball team – 2012 FIBA Africa Championship – Gold Medal roster
Players
Coaches

Pos.	No.	Name	Age – Date of birth	Height	Club	Ctr.
	4	Seydina Ba	16 – 31 December 1995
	5	Abdoulaye Dione	16 – 31 December 1995
	6	Khadim Fall	16 – 10 October 1995
	7	Mouhammad Ndour	16 – 31 December 1995
	8	Madiara Dieng	16 – 20 November 1995
	9	Souleymane Fall	17 – 10 March 1995
	10	Samba Ndiaye	17 – 30 December 1994
	11	Ibrahima Niang	18 – 18 August 1994
	12	Abdoulaye Ndoye	17 – 23 August 1995
	13	Pape Diatta	18 – 27 July 1994
	14	Ousseynou Gueye	16 – 25 December 1995
	15	Youssoupha Fall	17 – 12 January 1995

Head coach

- (Senegal) Madiene Fall

Assistant coach

- (Senegal) Ossumane Diallo
- (Senegal) Robert Faye

Legend

- (C) Team captain
- Club field describes current club

== Tunisia ==
Tunisia men's national U18 basketball team – 2012 FIBA Africa Championship - 6th place roster
Players
Coaches

Pos.	No.	Name	Age – Date of birth	Height	Club	Ctr.
SF	4	Amrou Bouallegue	16 – 24 December 1995	1.90 m (6 ft 3 in)
PG	5	Hamza Dhrif	18 – 17 May 1994	1.83 m (6 ft 0 in)
G	6	Mohamed Said	17 – 17 April 1995	1.88 m (6 ft 2 in)
G	7	Malek Mahjoubi	18 – 17 February 1994	1.86 m (6 ft 1 in)
SG	8	Naji Jaziri	17 – 21 October 1994
G	9	Bilel Gara	18 – 8 January 1994	1.85 m (6 ft 1 in)
C	10	Khalil Ghrib	17 – 13 December 1994
PG	11	Mohamed Gmiha	18 – 30 May 1994	1.83 m (6 ft 0 in)
C	12	Mohamed Mejri	17 – 9 May 1995	2.03 m (6 ft 8 in)
PF	13	Haithem Saada	17 – 3 February 1995	2.00 m (6 ft 7 in)
C	14	Mohamed Debache	18 – 1 March 1994	2.04 m (6 ft 8 in)
PF	15	Ghazi Salah	17 – 17 February 1995	1.97 m (6 ft 6 in)

Head coach

- K.Ben Ameur

Assistant coach

- Ch.Ben

Legend

- (C) Team captain
- Club field describes current club

== See also ==
- 2011 FIBA Africa Under-16 Championship squads
