= 2022 FIBA U18 African Championship =

2022 FIBA U18 AfroBasket
20th FIBA Under-18 African Basketball Championship

Tournament details
- Host country: Madagascar
- City: Antananarivo
- Dates: 4−14 August
- Teams: 9 (from 1 confederation)
- Venue: 1 (in 1 host city)

Final positions
- Champions: Egypt (6th title)
- Runners-up: Madagascar
- Third place: Mali

Tournament statistics
- MVP: (Madagascar) Mathias M'Madi
- Top scorer: (Madagascar) M'Madi (20.8)
- Top rebounds: (Senegal) M. Faye (13.7)
- Top assists: (Madagascar) M'Madi (5.0)
- PPG (Team): Senegal (73.8)
- RPG (Team): Senegal (54.7)
- APG (Team): Madagascar (16.6)

Official website
- www.fiba.basketball

The 2022 FIBA U18 African Championship was an international under-18 basketball competition that was held in Antananarivo, Madagascar from August 4 to 14.

The tournament, which was also the 20th edition of the biennial competition, qualified the top two teams to represent FIBA Africa in the 2023 FIBA Under-19 Basketball World Cup in Hungary. This is the second time Madagascar has hosted the tournament since 2014.

== Qualification ==
Means of Qualification	Dates	Venue	Berths	Qualifiers
Host Nation	N/A	N/A	1	Madagascar
2020 FIBA U18 African Championship	3–9 December 2020	(Egypt) Cairo	4	Mali; Senegal; Egypt; Guinea
2022 Zone I U18 Qualifiers	N/A	N/A	1	Algeria
2022 Zone II U18 Qualifiers	N/A	N/A	N/A	N/A
2022 Zone III U18 Qualifiers	N/A	N/A	1	Benin
2022 Zone IV U18 Qualifiers	N/A	N/A	N/A	N/A
2022 Zone V U18 Qualifiers	13–19 June 2022	(Uganda) Kampala	1	Rwanda
2022 Zone VI U18 Qualifiers	December 2021	(Lesotho) Maseru	1	Angola
2022 Zone VII U18 Qualifiers	N/A	N/A	N/A	N/A
Wildcard Entry	N/A	N/A	1	~~Tanzania~~; ~~Nigeria~~
Total			10	

=== Qualified teams ===
Includes current world ranking prior to the start of the tournament (in parentheses).

- Host Nation (1)
  - Madagascar (NR)
- Zone I
  - Algeria (46)
- Zone II
  - Guinea (42)
  - Mali (15)
  - Senegal (18)
- Zone III
  - Benin (NR)
- Zone V
  - Rwanda (51)
  - Egypt (25)
- Zone VI
  - Angola (47)

== Preliminary round ==
The draw took place and the final rosters were confirmed on 3 August 2022, a day before the start of the tournament.

Tanzania was supposed to be part of Group A, however they were replaced by Nigeria. Unfortunately, Nigeria also backed out, leaving Group A with only 4 teams.

All times are local (UTC+3).

=== Group A ===
Pos	Team	Pld	W	L	PF	PA	PD	Pts	Qualification
1	Senegal	3	3	0	240	160	+80	6	Advance to Quarterfinals
2	Madagascar (H)	3	2	1	219	160	+59	5	Advance to Quarterfinals
3	Algeria	3	1	2	193	181	+12	4	Advance to Quarterfinals
4	Benin	3	0	3	130	281	−151	3	Advance to Quarterfinals

Source: FIBA Africa
Rules for classification: 1) Points; 2) Head-to-head results; 3) Points difference; 4) Points scored.
(H) Hosts

5 August 2022
16:30

Boxscore

Madagascar	102–41	Benin
Scoring by quarter: 28–3, 21–16, 28–8, 25–14
Pts: M'Madi 26; Rebs: Rabibisoa 10; Asts: M'Madi 7		Pts: Mora Lafia 17; Rebs: Seibou 6 Asts: Seibou, Sanny, Bonou 1

Palais des Sports Mahamasina, Antananarivo
Referees: Erick Omondi Otieno (KEN), Mohamed Elmenshawy (EGY), Didier Shema Nshuti (RWA)

6 August 2022
12:30

Boxscore

Senegal	76–59	Algeria
Scoring by quarter: 19–16, 21–20, 23–11, 13–12
Pts: O. Ndiaye 21; Rebs: M. Faye 12; Asts: Cisse 5		Pts: Sedoud 20; Rebs: Ben Salah 8 Asts: Ben Salah 3

Palais des Sports Mahamasina, Antananarivo

7 August 2022
12:30

Boxscore

Benin	39–94	Senegal
Scoring by quarter: 7–33, 18–15, 10–13, 4–33
Pts: Moussa Yérima 14; Rebs: Seibou 12; Asts: Seibou, Sanny 2		Pts: O. Ndiaye 21; Rebs: S. Faye 17; Asts: Diene, Ma. Ndiaye 4

Palais des Sports Mahamasina, Antananarivo
Referees: Mohamed Elmenshawy (EGY), Mohamed Yaya Cisse (GUI), Didier Shema Nshuti (RWA)

7 August 2022
15:00

Boxscore

Algeria	49–55	Madagascar
Scoring by quarter: 13–20, 13–13, 14–14, 9–8
Pts: Bouhmama 15; Rebs: Ben Salah 20; Asts: 3 players 1		Pts: M'Madi 20; Rebs: Rakotonanahary 18; Asts: Rakotonanahary 6

Palais des Sports Mahamasina, Antananarivo
Referees: Erick Omondi Otieno (KEN), Francisco Tando (ANG), Aliou Abdou (MLI)

8 August 2022
12:30

Boxscore

Algeria	85–50	Benin
Scoring by quarter: 28–16, 27–12, 17–13, 13–9
Pts: Sedoud 19; Rebs: Abderrahim 8 Asts: Khodja 4		Pts: Tanimou 18; Rebs: Seibou, Tanimou 7 Asts: Seibou 4

Palais des Sports Mahamasina, Antananarivo
Referees: Francisco Tando (ANG), Peter Ontita (KEN), Aliou Abdou (MLI)

8 August 2022
17:30

Boxscore

Madagascar	62–70	Senegal
Scoring by quarter: 20–15, 16–16, 10–20, 16–19
Pts: M'Madi 18; Rebs: Rakotonanahary 10; Asts: Randimbiarivelo 5		Pts: M. Faye 26; Rebs: O. Ndiaye 18; Asts: Cisse 8

Palais des Sports Mahamasina, Antananarivo
Referees: Erick Omondi Otieno (KEN), Mohamed Elmenshawy (EGY), Didier Shema Nshuti (RWA)

=== Group B ===
Pos	Team	Pld	W	L	PF	PA	PD	Pts	Qualification
1	Mali	4	3	1	244	190	+54	7 (Note: MLI 46–41 EGY)	Advance to Quarterfinals
2	Egypt	4	3	1	253	184	+69	7	Advance to Quarterfinals
3	Guinea	4	2	2	203	233	−30	6 (Note: GUI 57–47 ANG)	Advance to Quarterfinals
4	Angola	4	2	2	217	238	−21	6	Advance to Quarterfinals
5	Rwanda	4	0	4	200	272	−72	4	

Source: FIBA Africa
Rules for classification: 1) Points; 2) Head-to-head results; 3) Points difference; 4) Points scored.
Notes:

4 August 2022
15:00

Boxscore

Angola	43–69	Egypt
Scoring by quarter: 5–17, 9–16, 10–27, 19–9
Pts: Joao 10; Rebs: Andrade 15; Asts: Andrade 2		Pts: Hendy 16; Rebs: Elshakery 8 Asts: Hendy 2

Palais des Sports Mahamasina, Antananarivo
Referees: Erick Omondi Otieno (KEN), Peter Ontita (KEN), Jerome Olivier Denis (MRI)

4 August 2022
17:30

Boxscore

Rwanda	49–67	Mali
Scoring by quarter: 11–16, 14–22, 8–16, 16–13
Pts: Kwizera, Sano 13; Rebs: Nubaha 9 Asts: Nubaha, Sano, Twizeyimama Cyiza Nshuti 2		Pts: Doumbia 24; Rebs: Doumbia, Mal. Diallo 9 Asts: Mal. Diallo 5

Palais des Sports Mahamasina, Antananarivo
Referees: Haja Maminiaini Ranaivoson (MAD), Nilton Macamo (MOZ), Adlen Larouci (ALG)

5 August 2022
12:30

Boxscore

Egypt	68–43	Guinea
Scoring by quarter: 25–17, 19–4, 17–12, 7–10
Pts: Elshakery 18; Rebs: Elshakery 7 Asts: Zahran, Hendy 3		Pts: I. Diallo 20; Rebs: Tounkara 13; Asts: Thiam 3

Palais des Sports Mahamasina, Antananarivo
Referees: Haja Maminiaini Ranaivoson (MAD), Nilton Macamo (MOZ), Jerome Olivier Denis (MRI)

5 August 2022
19:00

Boxscore

Mali	57–61	Angola
Scoring by quarter: 17–15, 7–15, 3–13, 30–18
Pts: Kanoute 26; Rebs: Doumbia 14; Asts: Mal. Diallo 2		Pts: Vungo 13; Rebs: Simao 9 Asts: Mangueira 3

Palais des Sports Mahamasina, Antananarivo
Referees: Yann Vezo Davidson (MAD), Peter Ontita (KEN), Adlen Larouci (ALG)

6 August 2022
15:00

Boxscore

Rwanda	44–64	Guinea
Scoring by quarter: 19–13, 7–10, 14–25, 4–16
Pts: Kwizera 12; Rebs: Kwizera 8 Asts: Sano 2		Pts: I. Diallo, Sanoh 15; Rebs: Sanoh 16; Asts: Thiam 4

Palais des Sports Mahamasina, Antananarivo
Referees: Yann Vezo Davidson (MAD), Peter Ontita (KEN), Papa Felix Seye (SEN)

6 August 2022
17:30

Boxscore

Mali	46–41	Egypt
Scoring by quarter: 20–11, 7–0, 12–14, 7–16
Pts: Diarra 16; Rebs: Doumbia 9 Asts: Mal. Diallo 3		Pts: Hendy 18; Rebs: Aly 10; Asts: Elshakery 2

Palais des Sports Mahamasina, Antananarivo

7 August 2022
17:30

Boxscore

Egypt	75–52	Rwanda
Scoring by quarter: 26–12, 17–17, 19–13, 13–10
Pts: Zahran 16; Rebs: Fahmi 14; Asts: 3 players 2		Pts: Sano 16; Rebs: Sano, Ishimwe 7 Asts: 4 players 2

Palais des Sports Mahamasina, Antananarivo
Referees: Adlen Larouci (ALG), Nilton Macamo (MOZ), Papa Felix Seye (SEN)

7 August 2022
20:00

Boxscore

Guinea	57–47	Angola
Scoring by quarter: 17–6, 15–9, 13–10, 12–22
Pts: I. Diallo 20; Rebs: Souare 14; Asts: I. Diallo 3		Pts: Andrade 14; Rebs: Andrade, Joao 7 Asts: Joao 2

Palais des Sports Mahamasina, Antananarivo
Referees: Yann Vezo Davidson (MAD), Jerome Olivier Denis (MRI), Emmanuel O.Paterne Kpawogbo (BEN)

8 August 2022
15:00

Boxscore

Angola	66–55	Rwanda
Scoring by quarter: 20–14, 15–10, 21–14, 10–17
Pts: Andrade 17; Rebs: Andrade 11; Asts: Mangueira, Nseka 4		Pts: three players 9 Rebs: Ishimwe 7 Asts: three players 3

Palais des Sports Mahamasina, Antananarivo
Referees: Yann Vezo Davidson (MAD), Adlen Larouci (ALG), Jerome Olivier Denis (MRI)

8 August 2022
20:00

Boxscore

Guinea	39–74	Mali
Scoring by quarter: 9–23, 6–11, 7–20, 17–20
Pts: Sanoh 11; Rebs: Souare 9 Asts: Kaba 3		Pts: Kanoute 22; Rebs: Mal. Diallo 10; Asts: three players 3

Palais des Sports Mahamasina, Antananarivo
Referees: Haja Maminiaini Ranaivoson (MAD), Nilton Macamo (MOZ), Emmanuel O.Paterne Kpawogbo (BEN)

== Knockout stage ==
=== Bracket ===
Fifth place
1A	Senegal	66
3B	Guinea	53
Seventh place
3A	Algeria	90
4A	Benin	54

5–8th place semifinals
1A	Senegal	73
3A	Algeria	55
3B	Guinea	95
4A	Benin	61

Quarterfinals
1A	Senegal	64
4B	Angola	67
3A	Algeria	50
2B	Egypt	58
2A	Madagascar	59
3B	Guinea	47
4A	Benin	46
1B	Mali	106

Semifinals
4B	Angola	57
2B	Egypt	67
2A	Madagascar	84
1B	Mali	81

Final
2B	Egypt	81
2A	Madagascar	54
Third place
4B	Angola	54
1B	Mali	79

=== Quarterfinals ===
10 August 2022
15:00

Boxscore

Benin	46–106	Mali
Scoring by quarter: 11–32, 13–16, 15–31, 7–27
Pts: Tanimou 8 Rebs: Moussa Yérima 9 Asts: Moussa Yérima 3		Pts: Diarra 24; Rebs: Diarra 17; Asts: Kanoute 5

Palais des Sports Mahamasina, Antananarivo
Referees: Erick Omondi Otieno (KEN), Francisco Tando (ANG), Didier Shema Nshuti (RWA)

10 August 2022
17:30

Boxscore

Guinea	47–59	Madagascar
Scoring by quarter: 10–18, 11–13, 12–17, 16–11
Pts: I. Diallo 20; Rebs: Sanoh 13; Asts: Kaba 2		Pts: M'Madi 28; Rebs: Rabibisoa 15; Asts: M'Madi 7

Palais des Sports Mahamasina, Antananarivo
Referees: Mohamed Elmenshawy (EGY), Adlen Larouci (ALG), Peter Ontita (KEN)

11 August 2022
15:00

Boxscore

Algeria	50–58	Egypt
Scoring by quarter: 20–21, 10–7, 11–13, 9–17
Pts: Bouhmama 15; Rebs: Bouhmama 9 Asts: Ben Salah 4		Pts: Zahran 13; Rebs: Elshakery 10; Asts: Elshakery 3

Palais des Sports Mahamasina, Antananarivo
Referees: Erick Omondi Otieno (KEN), Nilton Macamo (MOZ), Peter Ontita (KEN)

11 August 2022
17:30

Boxscore

Angola	67–64	Senegal
Scoring by quarter: 29–13, 14–21, 10–14, 14–16
Pts: Joao 22; Rebs: Joao 8 Asts: Nseka 4		Pts: O. Ndiaye 19; Rebs: M. Faye 12; Asts: Cisse 4

Palais des Sports Mahamasina, Antananarivo
Referees: Yann Vezo Davidson (MAD), Haja Maminiaini Ranaivoson (MAD), Jerome Olivier Denis (MRI)

=== 5–8th place classification ===
12 August 2022
12:30

Boxscore

Benin	61–95	Guinea
Scoring by quarter: 6–19, 14–32, 20–11, 21–33
Pts: Sanny 20; Rebs: Moussa Yérima 12; Asts: three players 1		Pts: Souare 26; Rebs: Dabo 17; Asts: I. Diallo, S. Diallo 4

Palais des Sports Mahamasina, Antananarivo
Referees: Mohamed Elmenshawy (EGY), Yann Vezo Davidson (MAD), Papa Felix Seye (SEN)

12 August 2022
15:00

Boxscore

Senegal	73–55	Algeria
Scoring by quarter: 23–15, 22–13, 19–8, 9–19
Pts: S. Faye 19; Rebs: S. Faye 11; Asts: Cisse, O. Ndiaye 3		Pts: Bouhmama 13; Rebs: Abderrahim, Bouhmama 7 Asts: Khodja 7

Palais des Sports Mahamasina, Antananarivo
Referees: Francisco Tando (ANG), Haja Maminiaini Ranaivoson (MAD), Aliou Abdou (MLI)

=== Semifinals ===
12 August 2022
17:30

Boxscore

Mali	81–84	Madagascar
Scoring by quarter: 18–25, 20–20, 24–19, 19–20
Pts: Kanoute 25; Rebs: Mal. Diallo 16; Asts: Mal. Diallo 4		Pts: Rabibisoa 23; Rebs: Andriatsarafara 10; Asts: M'Madi 6

Palais des Sports Mahamasina, Antananarivo
Referees: Adlen Larouci (ALG), Peter Ontita (KEN), Nilton Macamo (MOZ)

12 August 2022
20:00

Boxscore

Angola	57–67	Egypt
Scoring by quarter: 12–14, 12–15, 13–16, 20–22
Pts: Vungo 23; Rebs: Joao 8 Asts: Nseka 3		Pts: Hendy 15; Rebs: Aly 12; Asts: Elgizawy 5

Palais des Sports Mahamasina, Antananarivo
Referees: Erick Omondi Otieno (KEN), Jerome Olivier Denis (MRI), Didier Shema Nshuti (RWA)

=== Seventh place game ===
13 August 2022
13:00

Boxscore

Algeria	90–54	Benin
Scoring by quarter: 21–15, 18–12, 24–13, 27–14
Pts: Bouhmama 29; Rebs: Bouhmama 14; Asts: Yahiaoui, Bouhmama 3		Pts: Moussa Yérima 15; Rebs: Seibou 11; Asts: Moussa Yérima 3

Palais des Sports Mahamasina, Antananarivo
Referees: Haja Maminiaini Ranaivoson (MAD), Papa Felix Seye (SEN), Mohamed Yaya Cisse (GUI)

=== Fifth place game ===
13 August 2022
15:30

Boxscore

Senegal	66–53	Guinea
Scoring by quarter: 11–6, 20–16, 13–16, 22–15
Pts: M. Faye 31; Rebs: M. Faye 15; Asts: Diene 4		Pts: Souare 20; Rebs: Sanoh 7 Asts: I. Diallo, Souare 3

Palais des Sports Mahamasina, Antananarivo
Referees: Francisco Tando (ANG), Aliou Abdou (MLI), Didier Shema Nshuti (RWA)

=== Third place game ===
14 August 2022
14:30

Boxscore

Angola	54–79	Mali
Scoring by quarter: 13–21, 14–26, 4–18, 23–14
Pts: Neto 17; Rebs: Andrade 15; Asts: three players 2		Pts: Kanoute 17; Rebs: Mal. Diallo 18; Asts: Mal. Diallo 4

Palais des Sports Mahamasina, Antananarivo
Referees: Yann Vezo Davidson (MAD), Mohamed Elmenshawy (EGY), Yann Vezo Davidson (MAD), Peter Ontita (KEN)

=== Final ===
14 August 2022
17:30

Boxscore

Egypt	81–54	Madagascar
Scoring by quarter: 20–13, 21–8, 20–21, 20–12
Pts: Zahran 26; Rebs: Elshakery 9 Asts: Hussin 4		Pts: Andriatsarafara, M'Madi 14; Rebs: Andriatsarafara 9 Asts: M'Madi 2

Palais des Sports Mahamasina, Antananarivo
Referees: Erick Omondi Otieno (KEN), Adlen Larouci (ALG), Nilton Macamo (MOZ)

== Final standings ==
Qualified for the 2023 FIBA Under-19 Basketball World Cup

Rank	Team	Record
Gold medal	Egypt	6–1
Silver medal	Madagascar	4–2
Bronze medal	Mali	5–2
4	Angola	3–4
5	Senegal	5–1
6	Guinea	3–4
7	Algeria	2–4
8	Benin	0–6
9	Rwanda	0–4

== Awards ==
2022 Under-18 African champions

Egypt
Sixth title

Most Valuable Player
(Madagascar) Mathias M'Madi

=== All-Tournament Team ===
- C (Mali) Malick Diallo
- F (Egypt) Fahmi Fahmi
- F (Egypt) Belal Elshakery
- G (Madagascar) Mathias M'Madi (MVP)
- G (Guinea) Ibrahima Diallo
