= 2014 FIBA Africa Under-18 Championship =

2014 FIBA U18 AfroBasket
16th FIBA Under-18 African Basketball Championship

Tournament details
- Host country: Madagascar
- Dates: August 2–10, 2014
- Teams: 9 (from 1 confederation)
- Venue: 1 (in 1 host city)

Final positions
- Champions: Egypt

Tournament statistics
- MVP: (Angola) Gerson Domingos
- Top scorer: (Ivory Coast) Karaboue 20.4
- Top rebounds: (Benin) Chabi Yo 11.2
- Top assists: (Madagascar) Jean 4.8
- PPG (Team): Madagascar 82
- RPG (Team): Madagascar 49.7
- APG (Team): Madagascar 19.3

Official website
- 2014 FIBA Africa Under-18 Championship

The 2014 FIBA Africa Under-18 Championship was the 16th FIBA U18 African Championship, played under the rules of FIBA, the world governing body for basketball, and the FIBA Africa thereof. The tournament was hosted by Madagascar from August 2 to 10, with the games played at the Palais des Sports Mahamasina in Antananarivo.

Egypt defeated Tunisia 80–69 in the final to win their 5th title. The tournament qualified both the winner and the runner-up for the 2015 Under-19 World Cup.

== Draw ==
Group A	Group B
Benin; Madagascar; Mali; Mozambique	Angola; Ivory Coast; Gabon; Egypt; Tunisia

== Preliminary round ==
Times given below are in UTC+3.

=== Group A ===
Qualified for the quarter-finals

Team	Pts.	W	L	PF	PA	Diff
Madagascar	6	3	0	254	181	+73
Mali	5	2	1	187	168	+19
Mozambique	4	1	2	188	191	-3
Benin	3	0	3	144	233	-89

August 2
17:30

Boxscore

Madagascar	78–54	Mali
Scoring by quarter: 19-17, 16-15, 24-7, 19-15
Pts: Lívio 9 Rebs: Lívio 4 Asts: Yann 4		Pts: S.Konate 9 Rebs: Pare 3 Asts: Coulibaly 2

Palais des Sports, Antananarivo
Referees: Abdelaziz Abassi (TUN), Clésio Ramos (ANG)

August 4
15:00

Boxscore

Benin	46–69	Mozambique
Scoring by quarter: 7-21, 15-12, 8-17, 16-19
Pts: Chabi Yo 16; Rebs: Chabi Yo 17; Asts: Imorou 2		Pts: Fijamo 12; Rebs: Fijamo 10; Asts: Benjamin 5

Palais des Sports, Antananarivo
Referees: Heshem Kopt, Walelign Fikadu (ETH)

August 3
17:00

Boxscore

Madagascar	103–55	Benin
Scoring by quarter: 24-16, 26-11, 25-12, 28-16
Pts: Orlando 19; Rebs: Yann 9 Asts: Jean 7		Pts: Kokou 15; Rebs: Chabi Yo 10; Asts: Savi 2

Palais des Sports, Antananarivo
Referees: Hesham Metwaly (EGY), Walelign Fikadu (ETH),

August 5
15:00

Boxscore

Mozambique	47–72	Mali
Scoring by quarter: 10-26, 16-12, 9-15, 12-19
Pts: Júnior 10; Rebs: Munguambe 7 Asts: Benjamin 2		Pts: Kanouté, Coulibaly 15; Rebs: Pare, Diarra 9 Asts: Sangaré 4

Palais des Sports, Antananarivo

August 6
13:00

Boxscore

Mali	61–43	Benin
Scoring by quarter: 11-14, 20-6, 18-11, 12-12
Pts: Coulibaly 20; Rebs: Mounkoro 13; Asts: Sangaré 4		Pts: Imorou 16; Rebs: Imorou 12; Asts: Chicou 3

Palais des Sports, Antananarivo
Referees: Bennon Soobiah (MRI), Clésio Ramos (ANG), Abdelaziz Abassi (TUN)

17:00

Boxscore

Mozambique	72–73	Madagascar
Scoring by quarter: 20-30, 19-16, 19-7, 14-20
Pts: Fijamo 15; Rebs: Munguambe 13; Asts: three players 3		Pts: Elly 16; Rebs: Gilbert 11; Asts: three players 5

Palais des Sports, Antananarivo

=== Group B ===
Qualified for the quarter-finals

Team	Pts.	W	L	PF	PA	Diff
Egypt	7	3	1	302	209	+93
Tunisia	7	3	1	301	232	+69
Ivory Coast	6	2	2	250	265	-15
Angola	5	2	2	283	262	+21
Gabon	4	0	4	171	339	-168

August 2
15:00

Boxscore

Gabon	46–102	Egypt
Scoring by quarter: 8-25, 7-20, 12-23, 19-34
Pts: N'Dui 14; Rebs: Megne 9 Asts: Sarahn 3		Pts: A.Mohamed 18; Rebs: Alian 11; Asts: Elsayed 4

Palais des Sports, Antananarivo

19:30

Boxscore

Angola	70–83	Tunisia
Scoring by quarter: 9-27, 20-23, 17-10, 24-23
Pts: G.Gonçalves 22; Rebs: J.Neto 12; Asts: G.Domingos 2		Pts: Gannouni 30; Rebs: Saidani 8 Asts: Gannouni 4

Palais des Sports, Antananarivo
Referees: Marie Cherubin (MRI), Walelign Fikadu (ETH),

August 3
15:00

Boxscore

Gabon	41–76	Angola
Scoring by quarter: 10-24, 11-11, 9-24, 11-17
Pts: Sarahn 9 Rebs: Tgana 6 Asts: N'Dui 3		Pts: G.Gonçalves 21; Rebs: J.Neto 12; Asts: G.Gonçalves 4

Palais des Sports, Antananarivo
Referees: Haja Ranaivoson (MAD), Bennon Soobiah (MRI)

19:00

Boxscore

Ivory Coast	60–77	Tunisia
Scoring by quarter: 9-16, 23-20, 21-20, 7-21
Pts: Karaboue 18; Rebs: Tito 13; Asts: Karaboue 5		Pts: Mahmoud Hajri 19; Rebs: Soltani, Mahmoud Hajri 8 Asts: Dhif 7

Palais des Sports, Antananarivo
Referees: Marie Cherubin (MRI), Clésio Ramos (ANG)

August 4
17:00

Boxscore

Egypt	65–66	Angola
Scoring by quarter: 14-17, 19-16, 13-10, 19-23
Pts: A.Mohamed 19; Rebs: Alian 12; Asts: Hassan 2		Pts: G.Gonçalves 26; Rebs: G.Domingos, Dilson 11; Asts: G.Gonçalves 5

Palais des Sports, Antananarivo
Referees: Marie Cherubin (MRI), Bennon Soobiah (MRI)

19:00

Boxscore

Ivory Coast	74–56	Gabon
Scoring by quarter: 18-10, 15-11, 24-20, 17-15
Pts: Karaboue 30; Rebs: Kuo 13; Asts: Karaboue 5		Pts: three players 8 Rebs: Megne 9 Asts: Tgana, N'Dui 2

Palais des Sports, Antananarivo

August 5
17:00

Boxscore

Egypt	61–43	Ivory Coast
Scoring by quarter: 15-14, 8-10, 17-10, 21-9
Pts: M.Mohamed 18; Rebs: Alian 7 Asts: M.Mohamed, Elsayed 3		Pts: Karaboue 10; Rebs: Kone, Kuo 7 Asts: Karaboue 4

Palais des Sports, Antananarivo
Referees: Marie Cherubin (MRI), Walelign Fikadu (ETH), Haja Ranaivoson (MAD)

19:00

Boxscore

Tunisia	87–28	Gabon
Scoring by quarter: 23-6, 22-5, 20-7, 22-10
Pts: Gannouni, Jaouadi 21; Rebs: Soltani 8 Asts: Dhif 7		Pts: Sarahn 11; Rebs: Nguema 6 Asts: Rogandji, Mba 1

Palais des Sports, Antananarivo
Referees: Bennon Soobiah (MRI), Clésio Ramos (ANG), Andy Andriamandroso (MAD)

August 6
15:00

Boxscore

Angola	71–73	Ivory Coast
Scoring by quarter: 26-16, 9-23, 14-11, 22-23
Pts: G.Domingos 26; Rebs: G.Domingos 10; Asts: G.Domingos 4		Pts: Karaboue 24; Rebs: Kuo 14; Asts: Karaboue 6

Palais des Sports, Antananarivo
Referees: Marie Cherubin (MRI), Walelign Fikadu (ETH), Haja Ranaivoson (MAD)

19:00

Boxscore

Tunisia	54–74	Egypt
Scoring by quarter: 6-23, 13-19, 18-18, 17-14
Pts: Saidani 19; Rebs: Saidani 9 Asts: Jaouadi 2		Pts: Addami 18; Rebs: Azab 11; Asts: A.Mohamed 5

Palais des Sports, Antananarivo
Referees: Marie Cherubin (MRI), Clésio Ramos (ANG), Andy Andriamandroso (MAD)

== Knockout stage ==
Championship bracket

Quarter-finals
Fri 8 Aug 2014 – 13:00
Benin	39
Egypt	95
Fri 8 Aug 2014 – 15:00
Ivory Coast	47
Mali	60
Fri 8 Aug 2014 – 17:00
Angola	87
Madagascar	77
Fri 8 Aug 2014 – 19:00
Mozambique	58
Tunisia	70

Semi-finals
Sat 9 Aug 2014 – 17:00
Egypt	73
Mali	72
Sat 9 Aug 2014 – 19:00
Angola	57
Tunisia	61

Final
Sun 10 Aug 2014 – 18:00
Egypt	80
Tunisia	69
Third place
Sun 10 Aug 2014 – 14:00
Mali	75
Angola	65

5-8th bracket

5th-8th place
Sat 9 Aug 2014 – 17:00
Madagascar	79
Mozambique	54
Sat 9 Aug 2014 – 19:00
Benin	50
Ivory Coast	66

Fifth place
Sun 10 Aug 2014 – 18:00
Madagascar	82
Ivory Coast	68
Seventh place
Sun 10 Aug 2014 – 14:00
Mozambique	72
Benin	63

=== Quarter finals ===
August 8
13:00

Boxscore

Benin	39–95	Egypt
Scoring by quarter: 13-20, 11-32, 9-15, 6-28
Pts: Imorou 15; Rebs: Chabi Yo 8 Asts: Savi 2		Pts: A.Mohamed 20; Rebs: Alian 7 Asts: M.Mohamed 7

Palais des Sports Mahamasina, Antananarivo
Referees: Walelign Fikadu (ETH), Haja Ranaivoson (MAD), Andy Andriamandroso (MAD)

August 8
15:00

Boxscore

Ivory Coast	47–60	Mali
Pts: Karaboue 19; Rebs: Karaboue 13; Asts: Karaboue 3		Pts: S.Konate 15; Rebs: Pare 12; Asts: Coulibaly 5

Palais des Sports Mahamasina, Antananarivo
Referees: Abdelaziz Abassi (TUN), Selyo, Clésio Ramos (ANG)

August 8
17:00

Boxscore

Angola	87–77	Madagascar
Scoring by quarter: 14-18, 23-22, 18-26, 32-11
Pts: Moisés 22; Rebs: Moisés 13; Asts: G.Domingos 8		Pts: Yann 18; Rebs: K.Maheri 10; Asts: K.Mijoro 7

Palais des Sports Mahamasina, Antananarivo
Referees: Hesham Metwaly (EGY), Walelign Fikadu (ETH), Kouakou Niamien (CIV)

August 23
20:00

Boxscore

Mozambique	58–70	Tunisia
Scoring by quarter: 8-15, 8-14, 17-22, 25-19
Pts: Benjamin 16; Rebs: Fijamo 9 Asts: Fijamo 2		Pts: Gannouni 22; Rebs: Dhif 9 Asts: Dhif, Hajri 3

Palais des Sports Mahamasina, Antananarivo
Referees: Leslie, Pateine, Bennon Soobiah (MRI)

=== 5–8th place classification ===
August 9
13:00

Boxscore

Benin	50–66	Ivory Coast
Scoring by quarter: 9-14, 13-17, 10-16, 18-19
Pts: Chabi Yo 20; Rebs: Imorou 12; Asts: Chabi Yo 2		Pts: Karaboue 23; Rebs: Sylla 17; Asts: Toure 3

Palais des Sports Mahamasina, Antananarivo
Referees: Bennon Soobiah (MRI), Clésio Ramos (ANG), Andy Andriamandroso (MAD)

August 9
15:00

Boxscore

Madagascar	79–54	Mozambique
Scoring by quarter: 19-8, 17-15, 22-14, 21-17
Pts: K.Mijoro 14; Rebs: Mmadi 16; Asts: Mmadi 5		Pts: Chuma 12; Rebs: Fijamo 9 Asts: Benjamin 3

Palais des Sports Mahamasina, Antananarivo
Referees: Hesham Metwaly (EGY), Abdelaziz Abassi (TUN), Wilfried Nziengui (GAB)

=== Semifinals ===
August 9
17:00

Boxscore

Mali	72–73	Egypt
Scoring by quarter: 22-13, 15-16, 18-15, 17-29
Pts: Diarra 21; Rebs: Diarra, S.Konate 11; Asts: Coulibaly 6		Pts: Elsayed 21; Rebs: Alian 7 Asts: A.Mahmoud 3

Palais des Sports Mahamasina, Antananarivo
Referees: Leslie, Selio, Haja Ranaivoson (MAD)

August 9
19:00

Boxscore

Angola	57–61	Tunisia
Scoring by quarter: 16-13, 13-21, 13-20, 15-7
Pts: G.Domingos 22; Rebs: Moisés 13; Asts: J.Neto 3		Pts: Gannouni, Hajri 22; Rebs: Dhif 10; Asts: Dhif 5

Palais des Sports Mahamasina, Antananarivo
Referees: Walelign Fikadu (ETH), Bennon Soobiah (MRI), Kouakou Niamien (CIV)

=== 7th place match ===
August 10
10:30

Boxscore

Mozambique	72–63	Benin
Scoring by quarter: 18-8, 12-14, 22-24, 20-17
Pts: Benjamin 14; Rebs: Munguambe 9 Asts: Chuma 6		Pts: Chabi Yo 28; Rebs: Chabi Yo 15; Asts: Kokou 5

Palais des Sports Mahamasina, Antananarivo

=== 5th place match ===
August 10
16:00

Boxscore

Madagascar	82–68	Ivory Coast
Scoring by quarter: 17-19, 14-19, 26-12, 25-18
Pts: three players 16; Rebs: K.Maheri 11; Asts: Jean 4		Pts: Karaboue 19; Rebs: Sylla 12; Asts: Sylla 2

Palais des Sports Mahamasina, Antananarivo
Referees: Hesham Metwaly (EGY), Abdelaziz Abassi (TUN), Clésio Ramos (ANG)

=== Bronze medal match ===
August 10
14:00

Boxscore

Angola	65–75	Mali
Scoring by quarter: 25-19, 11-14, 14-24, 15-18
Pts: G.Domingos 19; Rebs: G.Gonçalves 8 Asts: G.Gonçalves 3		Pts: Coulibaly 18; Rebs: Diarra 15; Asts: Diarra, Sangaré 5

Palais des Sports Mahamasina, Antananarivo
Referees: Leslie, Kouakou Niamien (CIV), Haja Ranaivoson (MAD)

=== Final ===
August 10
18:00

Boxscore

Tunisia	69–80	Egypt
Scoring by quarter: 10-13, 23-19, 20-23, 16-25
Pts: Jaouadi 17; Rebs: Dallai 11; Asts: Dhif 5		Pts: A.Mohamed 24; Rebs: Alian 14; Asts: M.Mahmoud 3

Palais des Sports Mahamasina, Antananarivo
Referees: Walelign Fikadu (ETH), Clésio Ramos (ANG)

== Final standings ==
Qualified for the 2015 Under-19 World Cup

Rank	Team	Record
Gold medal	Egypt	6–1
Silver medal	Tunisia	5–2
Bronze medal	Mali	4–2
4	Angola	3–4
5	Madagascar	5–1
6	Ivory Coast	3–4
7	Mozambique	2–4
8	Benin	0–6
9	Gabon	0–3

Egypt roster
Ahmed Mahmoud, Mamdouh Elkaft, Basem Alian, Kareem Aly, Mahmoud Mahmoud, Mohamed Mohamed, Abdelrahman Mohamed, Ahmed Elsayed, Karim Azab, Bassam Hassan, Mohamed Youssef, Mohamed Mohamed, Coach: Jemc Branislav

== Awards ==
2014 FIBA Africa Under-18 Championship winner

Egypt
Fifth title

Most Valuable Player
(Angola) Gerson Domingos

=== All-Tournament Team ===
- (Angola) G Gerson Domingos MVP
- (Ivory Coast) G Amboudou Karaboue
- (Egypt) F Abdelrahman Mohamed
- (Madagascar) F Yann Rakotomalala
- (Mali) C Sagaba Konate

== Statistical leaders ==
=== Individual Tournament Highs ===
Points

Rank	Name	G	Pts	PPG
1	(Ivory Coast) Amboudou Karaboue	7	143	20.4
2	(Angola) Gerson Domingos	7	132	18.9
3	(Tunisia) Achref Gannouni	7	130	18.6
4	(Benin) Soulémane Chabi Yo	6	104	17.3
5	(Angola) Gerson Gonçalves	7	116	16.6
6	(Egypt) Abdelrahman Mohamed	7	107	15.3
7	(Mali) Makan Coulibaly	6	89	14.8
8	(Angola) Moisés César	7	94	13.4
9	(Tunisia) Mahmoud Hajri	7	89	12.7
10	(Madagascar) Kiady Rabarijoelina	6	74	12.3

Rebounds

Rank	Name	G	Rbs	RPG
1	(Benin) Soulémane Chabi Yo	6	67	11.2
2	(Mali) Mamoudou Diarra	6	66	11
3	(Ivory Coast) Sahié Kuo	5	50	10
4	(Ivory Coast) Hamadou Sylla	7	64	9.1
5	(Egypt) Basem Alian	7	63	9
6	(Benin) Adnane Imorou	6	52	8.7
7	(Angola) Moisés César	7	60	8.6
8	(Mozambique) Ayad Munguambe	6	46	7.7
9	(Mozambique) Tomás Fijamo	6	43	7.2
9	(Madagascar) Kiady Rabarijoelina	6	43	7.2

Assists

Rank	Name	G	Ast	APG
1	(Madagascar) J. Rakotomiaramanana	6	29	4.8
2	(Tunisia) Ahmad Dhif	7	31	4.4
3	(Madagascar) Kiady Razanamahenina	6	23	3.8
4	(Ivory Coast) Amboudou Karaboue	7	25	3.6
5	(Mali) Tiémoko Sangaré	6	19	3.2
6	(Angola) Gerson Domingos	7	22	3.1
7	(Mali) Makan Coulibaly	6	16	2.7
8	(Egypt) Ahmed Elsayed	7	18	2.6
8	(Angola) Gerson Gonçalves	7	18	2.6
8	(Egypt) Abdelrahman Mohamed	7	18	2.6

Steals

Rank	Name	G	Sts	SPG
1	(Gabon) Mahony N'Dui	4	12	3
2	(Angola) Gerson Domingos	7	19	2.7
3	(Benin) Soulémane Chabi Yo	6	15	2.5
3	(Mali) Makan Coulibaly	6	15	2.5
5	(Tunisia) Achref Gannouni	7	16	2.3
5	(Ivory Coast) Amboudou Karaboue	7	16	2.3
5	(Egypt) Mohamed Mohamed	6	14	2.3
8	(Egypt) Abdelrahman Mohamed	7	14	2
8	(Ivory Coast) Yacouba Sanogo	5	10	2
10	(Tunisia) Ahmad Dhif	7	13	1.9

Blocks

Rank	Name	G	Bks	BPG
1	(Madagascar) Kevin Gilbert	6	13	2.2
2	(Mali) Mamoudou Diarra	6	9	1.5
2	(Gabon) Channick Nkoma	4	6	1.5
4	(Benin) Adnane Imorou	6	8	1.3
4	(Madagascar) Kiady Rabarijoelina	6	8	1.3
6	(Ivory Coast) Sahié Kuo	5	6	1.2
7	(Egypt) Karim Azab	7	8	1.1
7	(Ivory Coast) Hamadou Sylla	7	8	1.1
9	(Egypt) Basem Alian	7	7	1
9	(Gabon) Didier Maganga	4	4	1

Turnovers

Rank	Name	G	Tos	TPG
1	(Gabon) Stephanel Sarahn	4	22	5.5
2	(Benin) Romuald Chicou	6	30	5
3	(Ivory Coast) Paul Tito	7	34	4.9
4	(Gabon) Mahony N'dui	4	17	4.3
4	(Gabon) Brandon Mba	4	17	4.3
6	(Benin) Adnane Imorou	6	25	4.2
6	(Benin) Soulémane Yo	6	25	4.2
8	(Benin) Kouessivi Koukou	6	24	4
9	(Mozambique) Tomas Fijamo	6	22	3.7
10	(Ivory Coast) Amboudou Karaboue	7	25	3.6

2-point field goal percentage

Pos	Name	A	M	%
1	(Egypt) Abdelrahman Mohamed	51	35	68.6
2	(Madagascar) Kiady Rabarijoelina	41	25	61
3	(Ivory Coast) Sahié Kuo	38	20	52.6
4	(Egypt) Mahmoud Mahmoud	42	22	52.4
4	(Madagascar) Livio Ratianarivo	42	22	52.4
6	(Mali) Sagaba Konate	45	23	51.1
7	(Ivory Coast) Amboudou Karaboue	87	44	50.6
8	(Angola) Moisés César	71	35	49.3
9	(Angola) Gerson Gonçalves	53	25	47.2
10	(Tunisia) Achref Gannouni	84	39	46.4

3-point field goal percentage

Pos	Name	A	M	%
1	(Madagascar) Yann Rakotomalala	14	7	50
2	(Angola) Gerson Gonçalves	34	16	47.1
3	(Egypt) Basem Alian	22	9	40.9
4	(Mozambique) Titos Fernando	32	12	37.5
5	(Madagascar) Elly Randriamampionona	27	10	37
6	(Tunisia) Firas Fatnassi	22	8	36.4
7	(Egypt) Mohamed Mohamed	14	5	35.7
8	(Angola) Gerson Domingos	63	22	34.9
9	(Mali) N'faly Kanouté	41	14	34.1
10	(Benin) Kouessivi Kokou	23	7	30.4

Free throw percentage

Pos	Name	A	M	%
1	(Tunisia) Younes Saidani	23	22	95.7
2	(Madagascar) Yann Rakotomalala	21	18	85.7
3	(Angola) Gerson Gonçalves	23	18	78.3
4	(Egypt) Abdelrahman Mohamed	36	28	77.8
5	(Tunisia) Jawhar Jawadi	20	14	70
6	(Tunisia) Achref Gannouni	53	37	69.8
7	(Angola) Gerson Domingos	47	32	68.1
8	(Angola) Moisés César	31	21	67.7
9	(Madagascar) Kiady Rabarijoelina	27	18	66.7
10	(Egypt) Mohamed Mohamed	27	17	63

=== Individual Game Highs ===
Department	Name	Total	Opponent
Points	(Tunisia) Achref Gannouni (Ivory Coast) Amboudou Karaboue	30	Angola; Gabon
Rebounds	(Benin) Soulémane Chabi Yo (Ivory Coast) Hamadou Sylla	17	Mozambique; Benin
Assists	(Angola) Gerson Domingos	8	Madagascar
Steals	four players	6	
Blocks	(Madagascar) Kevin Gilbert	6	Mozambique
2-point field goal percentage	(Madagascar) Kiady Rabarijoelina	100% (6/6)	Mozambique
3-point field goal percentage	(Tunisia) Achref Gannouni	100% (3/3)	Angola
Free throw percentage	(Tunisia) Younes Saidani	100% (7/7)	Egypt
Turnovers	(Gabon) Stephanel Sarahn	12	Tunisia

=== Team Tournament Highs ===
Points

Rank	Name	G	Pts	PPG
1	Madagascar	6	492	82
2	Egypt	7	550	78.6
3	Tunisia	7	501	71.6
4	Angola	7	492	70.3
5	Mali	6	394	65.7
6	Mozambique	6	372	62
7	Ivory Coast	7	431	61.6
8	Benin	6	296	49.3
9	Gabon	4	171	42.8

Rebounds

Rank	Name	G	Rbs	RPG
1	Madagascar	6	298	49.7
2	Ivory Coast	7	330	47.1
2	Egypt	7	330	47.1
4	Mali	6	275	45.8
5	Mozambique	6	274	45.7
6	Angola	7	317	45.3
7	Benin	6	250	41.7
8	Gabon	4	158	39.5
9	Tunisia	7	276	39.4

Assists

Rank	Name	G	Ast	APG
1	Madagascar	6	116	19.3
2	Egypt	7	98	14
3	Tunisia	7	85	12.1
4	Mali	6	72	12
5	Mozambique	6	69	11.5
6	Angola	7	70	10
7	Ivory Coast	7	60	8.6
8	Gabon	4	29	7.3
9	Benin	6	34	5.7

Steals

Rank	Name	G	Sts	SPG
1	Benin	6	71	11.8
2	Ivory Coast	7	78	11.1
2	Egypt	7	78	11.1
4	Tunisia	7	74	10.6
5	Madagascar	6	63	10.5
6	Gabon	4	38	9.5
7	Mozambique	6	55	9.2
8	Mali	6	52	8.7
9	Angola	7	56	8

Blocks

Rank	Name	G	Bks	BPG
1	Madagascar	6	34	5.7
2	Benin	6	23	3.8
3	Ivory Coast	7	26	3.7
4	Egypt	7	25	3.6
5	Gabon	4	13	3.2
6	Mali	6	14	2.3
7	Mozambique	6	6	1
8	Angola	7	6	0.9
9	Tunisia	7	5	0.7

Turnovers

Rank	Name	G	Tos	TPG
1	Gabon	4	119	29.8
2	Benin	6	163	27.2
3	Ivory Coast	7	176	25.1
4	Mozambique	6	142	23.7
5	Madagascar	6	136	22.7
6	Mali	6	115	19.2
7	Egypt	7	125	17.9
8	Angola	7	112	16
9	Tunisia	7	107	15.3

2-point field goal percentage

Pos	Name	A	M	%
1	Egypt	304	157	51.6
2	Madagascar	304	150	49.3
3	Ivory Coast	352	149	42.3
4	Tunisia	317	128	40.4
5	Mali	268	107	39.9
6	Mozambique	306	120	39.2
7	Angola	333	130	39
8	Benin	328	102	31.1
9	Gabon	187	53	28.3

3-point field goal percentage

Pos	Name	A	M	%
1	Angola	148	46	31.1
2	Tunisia	137	38	27.7
3	Madagascar	136	37	27.2
4	Egypt	147	37	25.2
5	Mali	129	32	24.8
6	Mozambique	102	23	22.5
7	Gabon	60	13	21.7
8	Ivory Coast	68	13	19.1
9	Benin	59	9	15.3

Free throw percentage

Pos	Name	A	M	%
1	Tunisia	179	131	73.2
2	Angola	144	94	65.3
3	Egypt	207	125	60.4
4	Benin	108	65	60.2
5	Madagascar	135	81	60
6	Mali	149	84	56.4
7	Ivory Coast	188	94	50
8	Mozambique	126	63	50
9	Gabon	59	26	44.1

=== Team Game highs ===
Department	Name	Total	Opponent
Points	Madagascar	103	Benin
Rebounds	Mozambique; Ivory Coast	60	Gabon; Benin
Assists	Madagascar	23	Benin
Steals	Tunisia	28	Gabon
Blocks	Benin	10	Mozambique
2-point field goal percentage	Egypt	61.9% (26/42)	Tunisia
3-point field goal percentage	Angola	52.9% (9/17)	Madagascar
Free throw percentage	Tunisia	84% (21/25)	Angola
Turnovers	Gabon	42	Tunisia

== See also ==
2013 FIBA Africa Under-16 Championship
