= 2012 FIBA Africa Under-18 Championship =

2012 FIBA U18 AfroBasket
15th FIBA Under-18 African Basketball Championship

Tournament details
- Host country: Mozambique
- Dates: August 16–25, 2012
- Teams: 11
- Venue(s): 1 (in 1 host city)

Final positions
- Champions: Senegal (1st title)

Tournament statistics
- MVP: (Egypt) Ehab Amin
- Top scorer: (Morocco) Mourad Shifi
- Top rebounds: (Senegal) Abdoulaye Ndoye

Official website
- 2012 FIBA Africa Under-18 Championship

The 2012 FIBA Africa Under-18 Championship was the 15th FIBA Africa Under-18 Championship, played under the rules of FIBA, the world governing body for basketball, and the FIBA Africa thereof. The tournament was hosted by Mozambique from August 16 to 25, with the games played at the Pavilhão da Académica in Maputo.

Senegal defeated Ivory Coast 71–62 in the final to win their first title. The tournament qualified both the winner and the runner-up for the 2013 Under-19 World Cup.

== Draw ==
Group A	Group B
Ghana; Mali; Mozambique; Rwanda; Tunisia	Angola; Egypt; Gabon; Ivory Coast; Morocco; Senegal

== Preliminary round ==
Times given below are in UTC+2.

=== Group A ===
Qualified for the quarter-finals

Team	Pts.	W	L	PF	PA	Diff
Mali	7	3	1	207	194	+13
Ghana	7	3	1	204	181	+23
Mozambique	6	2	2	208	236	-28
Tunisia	5	1	3	193	205	-12
Rwanda	5	1	3	176	172	+4

August 16
18:00

Boxscore

Mozambique	34–62	Rwanda
Scoring by quarter: 9-15, 11-17, 6-17, 8-13
Pts: Hugo 12; Rebs: Breaton 4 Asts: Yuri 1		Pts: Ngenzi 19; Rebs: Shyaka 11; Asts: Ngenzi, Manzi 3

Pavilhão da Académica, Maputo

August 18
12:00

Boxscore

Ghana	47–44	Tunisia
Scoring by quarter: 10-12, 17-8, 11-13, 9-11
Pts: Alhassan 15; Rebs: three players 3 Asts: Alhassan, Gadu 1		Pts: Gara, Mahjoubi 8 Rebs: Debache 5 Asts: four players 1

Pavilhão da Académica, Maputo

August 17
14:00

Boxscore

Tunisia	43–38	Rwanda
Scoring by quarter: 9-13, 10-4, 10-11, 14-10
Pts: Ghrib 13; Rebs: Ghrib 6 Asts: Gmiha, Jaziri 1		Pts: Shyaka 10; Rebs: Shyaka, Manzi 5 Asts: Rafiki 2

Pavilhão da Académica, Maputo

August 17
18:00

Boxscore

Mozambique	66–54 (OT)	Mali
Scoring by quarter: 7-12, 14-14, 14-17, 16-8, Overtime: 15-3
Pts: Hugo 21; Rebs: C.Chirindza 9 Asts: Faduco 6		Pts: Coulibaly 17; Rebs: Sidibe 10; Asts: Coulibaly, Sidibe 2

Pavilhão da Académica, Maputo

August 18
20:00

Boxscore

Mali	47–33	Rwanda
Scoring by quarter: 8-5, 17-15, 13-4, 8-9
Pts: Drame 13; Rebs: Sidibe 9 Asts: Drame 2		Pts: Ngenzi 9 Rebs: Rafiki 5 Asts: Shyaka 2

Pavilhão da Académica, Maputo

August 21
18:00

Boxscore

Ghana	66–47	Mozambique
Scoring by quarter: 16-16, 13-7, 19-11, 18-13
Pts: Alhassan 17; Rebs: Gadu 9 Asts: Alhassan 2		Pts: Helton 16; Rebs: Helton 10; Asts: J.Tomé 2

Pavilhão da Académica, Maputo

August 19
16:00

Boxscore

Mali	47–43	Ghana
Scoring by quarter: 9-11, 11-15, 12-7, 15-10
Pts: M.Traore 12; Rebs: M.Traore 8 Asts: three players 1		Pts: Alhassan 12; Rebs: Ayarna 5 Asts: Alhassan, Morgan 2

Pavilhão da Académica, Maputo

August 20
18:00

Boxscore

Mozambique	61–54	Tunisia
Scoring by quarter: 18-11, 16-9, 17-17, 10-17
Pts: J.Tomé 22; Rebs: C.Chirindza 16; Asts: Hugo 4		Pts: Jaziri 17; Rebs: Debache 5 Asts: Mahjoubi 2

Pavilhão da Académica, Maputo

August 20
12:00

Boxscore

Rwanda	43–48	Ghana
Scoring by quarter: 7-16, 10-7, 14-11, 12-14
Pts: Rafiki 11; Rebs: Shyaka 5 Asts: Rurangirwa 3		Pts: Alhassan 20; Rebs: Ayarna 6 Asts: Alhassan, Riyazudeen 1

Pavilhão da Académica, Maputo

August 21
20:00

Boxscore

Tunisia	52–59	Mali
Scoring by quarter: 16-9, 6-21, 18-14, 12-15
Pts: Mahjoubi 20; Rebs: Ghrib 8 Asts: Gmiha 4		Pts: Sidibe 18; Rebs: Sidibe 10; Asts: Coulibaly 7

Pavilhão da Académica, Maputo

=== Group B ===
Qualified for the quarter-finals

Team	Pts.	W	L	PF	PA	Diff
Egypt	10	5	0	331	231	+100
Senegal	9	4	1	301	268	+33
Ivory Coast	8	3	2	277	265	+12
Angola	7	2	3	256	282	-26
Gabon	6	1	4	252	302	-50
Morocco	5	0	5	227	295	-68

August 16
14:00

Boxscore

Senegal	73–69	Gabon
Scoring by quarter: 20-18, 23-12, 16-19, 14-20
Pts: Ndoye 7 Rebs: Ndiaye 3 Asts: three players 1		Pts: Ossami 7 Rebs: three players 1 Asts: Junior Messi 2

Pavilhão da Académica, Maputo

August 16
16:00

Boxscore

Ivory Coast	60–51	Angola
Scoring by quarter: 13-20, 15-8, 24-11, 16-12
Pts: Otto 17; Rebs: D.Traore 6 Asts: three players 1		Pts: Kanza 16; Rebs: Kanza 5 Asts: Ivanádio 4

Pavilhão da Académica, Maputo

August 19
18:00

Boxscore

Egypt	65–47	Morocco
Scoring by quarter: 12-16, 12-14, 19-14, 22-9
Pts: Amin 19; Rebs: Amin, M.Ahmed 3 Asts: Nadi, Farag 3		Pts: Shifi 13; Rebs: El Cunma 5 Asts: Hanine 2

Pavilhão da Académica, Maputo

August 17
12:00

Boxscore

Gabon	45–57	Ivory Coast
Scoring by quarter: 14-11, 9-18, 12-13, 10-15
Pts: Ossami 27; Rebs: Sima, Messi 6 Asts: Messi		Pts: Oulai 10; Rebs: Bah 6 Asts: Touré 2

Pavilhão da Académica, Maputo

August 17
17:00

Boxscore

Angola	58–25	Morocco
Scoring by quarter: 11-10, 14-8, 13-1, 19-6
Pts: Ivanádio 12; Rebs: Mieze 6 Asts: J.Kipanda, J.Francisco 3		Pts: Shifi 7 Rebs: three players 3 Asts: Shifi, Kannouwni 1

Pavilhão da Académica, Maputo

August 17
20:00

Boxscore

Egypt	49–39	Senegal
Scoring by quarter: 15-12, 7-8, 13-12, 14-7
Pts: Romeh, M.Ahmed 10; Rebs: A.Mahmoud 8 Asts: Romeh, Fakhry 1		Pts: Ndoye, Ndour 10; Rebs: Niang 7 Asts: three players 1

Pavilhão da Académica, Maputo

August 18
14:00

Boxscore

Gabon	40–51	Angola
Scoring by quarter: 4-13, 9-13, 9-14, 18-11
Pts: Ossami 16; Rebs: Sima 7 Asts: Messi 2		Pts: Kanza 17; Rebs: Mieze 7 Asts: C.Cabral 5

Pavilhão da Académica, Maputo

August 18
16:00

Boxscore

Senegal	61–52	Morocco
Scoring by quarter: 14-14, 10-11, 19-17, 18-10
Pts: Ndour 17; Rebs: Ndoye 6 Asts: five players 1		Pts: Shifi 30; Rebs: Azouga 6 Asts: Shifi 3

Pavilhão da Académica, Maputo

August 18
18:00

Boxscore

Ivory Coast	45–49	Egypt
Scoring by quarter: 8-11, 10-18, 10-8, 17-12
Pts: Otto 17; Rebs: D.Traore 5 Asts: Otto 1		Pts: Romeh 13; Rebs: Elsayed 4 Asts: four players 1

Pavilhão da Académica, Maputo

August 20
14:00

Boxscore

Egypt	90–49	Angola
Scoring by quarter: 27-10, 22-13, 21-11, 20-15
Pts: Amin 19; Rebs: Moatez 5 Asts: Moatez, Farag 2		Pts: Ivanádio 10; Rebs: J.Francisco, Dó 5 Asts: C.Cabral 2

Pavilhão da Académica, Maputo

August 20
16:00

Boxscore

Ivory Coast	53–61	Senegal
Scoring by quarter: 20-13, 12-16, 12-10, 9-22
Pts: Oulai 13; Rebs: three players 4 Asts: Touré 4		Pts: Ndoye, Ndour 19; Rebs: Ndoye 6 Asts: Ndour 2

Pavilhão da Académica, Maputo

August 20
20:00

Boxscore

Morocco	44–47	Gabon
Scoring by quarter: 11-14, 17-13, 6-16, 10-4
Pts: Shifi 18; Rebs: El Cunma 14; Asts: four players 1		Pts: Sima 14; Rebs: Sima 9 Asts: three players 2

Pavilhão da Académica, Maputo

August 21
12:00

Boxscore

Angola	45–67	Senegal
Scoring by quarter: 9-19, 6-21, 24-12, 6-15
Pts: Ivanádio 11; Rebs: Mieze 5 Asts: Ivanádio 2		Pts: Ndour 18; Rebs: Niang 6 Asts: Dione 3

Pavilhão da Académica, Maputo

August 21
14:00

Boxscore

Morocco	59–62	Ivory Coast
Scoring by quarter: 9-16, 17-13, 13-23, 20-10
Pts: Shifi 21; Rebs: El Cunma 6 Asts: Kannouwni 3		Pts: Otto 20; Rebs: Otto 9 Asts: Touré 4

Pavilhão da Académica, Maputo

August 21
16:00

Boxscore

Gabon	51–78	Egypt
Scoring by quarter: 10-14, 11-20, 13-27, 17-17
Pts: Ossami 21; Rebs: Sima 5 Asts: Sima 4		Pts: Moatez 22; Rebs: Moatez 10; Asts: Fakhry 3

Pavilhão da Académica, Maputo

== Knockout stage ==
Championship bracket

Quarter-finals
Thu 23 Aug 2012 – 18:00
Mozambique	37
Senegal	62
Thu 23 Aug 2012 – 14:00
Angola	54
Mali	62
Thu 23 Aug 2012 – 20:00
Tunisia	44
Egypt	68
Thu 23 Aug 2012 – 16:00
Ivory Coast	64
Ghana	48

Semi-finals
Fri 24 Aug 2012 – 18:00
Mali	47
Senegal	64
Fri 24 Aug 2012 – 20:00
Egypt	42
Ivory Coast	57

Final
Sat 25 Aug 2012 – 18:00
Senegal	71
Ivory Coast	62
Third place
Sat 25 Aug 2012 – 15:30
Mali	54
Egypt	78

5-8th bracket

5th-8th place
Fri 24 Aug 2012 – 16:00
Angola	54
Mozambique	49
Fri 24 Aug 2012 – 14:00
Tunisia	59
Ghana	55

Fifth place
Sat 25 Aug 2012 – 13:30
Angola	61
Tunisia	40
Seventh place
Sat 25 Aug 2012 – 11:30
Mozambique	48
Ghana	45

9th place classification

9th-12th Place
Thu 23 Aug 2012 – 12:00
Morocco	74
Rwanda	66

9th place
Fri 24 Aug 2012 – 12:00
Morocco	77
Gabon	71
11th place

=== 9-11th place classification ===
August 23
12:00

Morocco	74–66	Rwanda
Scoring by quarter: 17-12, 13-7, 23-19, 21-18
Pts: n/a		Pts: n/a

Pavilhão da Académica, Maputo

=== Quarter-finals ===
August 23
14:00

Angola	54–62	Mali
Scoring by quarter: 12-12, 11-19, 15-15, 16-16
Pts: n/a		Pts: n/a

Pavilhão da Académica, Maputo

August 23
16:00

Ivory Coast	64–48	Ghana
Scoring by quarter: 16-11, 18-11, 15-16, 15-10
Pts: n/a		Pts: n/a

Pavilhão da Académica, Maputo

August 23
18:00

Mozambique	37–62	Senegal
Scoring by quarter: 7-15, 7-16, 11-12, 12-19
Pts: n/a		Pts: n/a

Pavilhão da Académica, Maputo

August 23
20:00

Tunisia	44–68	Egypt
Scoring by quarter: 9-20, 15-15, 15-16, 5-17
Pts: n/a		Pts: n/a

Pavilhão da Académica, Maputo

=== 9th place match ===
August 24
12:00

Morocco	77–71 (OT)	Gabon
Scoring by quarter: 22-11, 6-22, 17-14, 17-15, Overtime: 15-9
Pts: n/a		Pts: n/a

Pavilhão da Académica, Maputo

=== 5–8th place classification ===
August 24
14:00

Tunisia	59–55	Ghana
Pts: n/a		Pts: n/a

Pavilhão da Académica, Maputo

August 24
16:00

Angola	54–49	Mozambique
Pts: n/a		Pts: n/a

Pavilhão da Académica, Maputo

=== Semifinals ===
August 24
18:00

Mali	47–64	Senegal
Scoring by quarter: 12-17, 8-15, 16-16, 11-16
Pts: n/a		Pts: n/a

Pavilhão da Académica, Maputo

August 24
20:00

Egypt	42–57	Ivory Coast
Scoring by quarter: 8-13, 13-9, 11-15, 10-20
Pts: n/a		Pts: n/a

Pavilhão da Académica, Maputo

=== 7th place match ===
August 25
11:30

Mozambique	48–45	Ghana
Pts: n/a		Pts: n/a

Pavilhão da Académica, Maputo

=== 5th place match ===
August 25
13:30

Boxscore

Angola	61–40	Tunisia
Scoring by quarter: 10-11, 12-9, 15-16, 24-4
Pts: Mieze 23; Rebs: Mieze 11; Asts: Kanza, J.Domingos 1		Pts: Mahjoubi, Gara 9 Rebs: Salah 7 Asts: Mahjoubi, Gmiha 2

Pavilhão da Académica, Maputo

=== Bronze medal match ===
August 25
15:30

Boxscore

Mali	54–78	Egypt
Scoring by quarter: 18-25, 12-13, 13-25, 11-15
Pts: Doumbia 15; Rebs: Doumbia 4 Asts: Coulibaly 3		Pts: Amin 25; Rebs: M.Ahmed 5 Asts: Nadi 4

Pavilhão da Académica, Maputo

=== Final ===
August 25
18:00

Boxscore

Senegal	71–62	Ivory Coast
Scoring by quarter: 18-18, 11-15, 14-13, 28-16
Pts: Ndour 17; Rebs: Gueye 8 Asts: Ndour 5		Pts: Otto 18; Rebs: D.Traore 6 Asts: Touré, Oulai 2

Pavilhão da Académica, Maputo

== Final standings ==
Qualified for the 2013 Under-19 World Cup

Rank	Team	Record
Gold medal	Senegal	7–1
Silver medal	Ivory Coast	5–3
Bronze medal	Egypt	7–1
4	Mali	4–3
5	Angola	4–4
6	Tunisia	2–5
7	Mozambique	3–4
8	Ghana	3–4
9	Morocco	2–5
10	Gabon	1–5
11	Rwanda	1–4

Senegal roster
Abdoulaye Dione, Abdoulaye Ndoye, Ibrahima Niang, Khadim Fall, Madiara Dieng, Mouhammad Ndour, Ousseynou Gueye, Pape Diatta, Samba Ndiaye, Seydina Ba, Souleymane Fall, Youssoupha Fall, Coach: Madiene Fall

== Awards ==
2012 FIBA Africa Under-18 Championship winners

Senegal
First title

Most Valuable Player
(Egypt) Ehab Amin

=== All-Tournament Team ===
- (Mali) Boubacar Coulibaly
- (Egypt) Ehab Amin
- (Ivory Coast) Kehasson Oulai
- (Senegal) Aboulaye Ndoye
- (Egypt) Moatez Ali

== See also ==
- 2011 FIBA Africa Under-16 Championship
