= Gaston Gambor =

Central African military officer and politician

Minister of Youth and Sports
- In office 11 December 1987 – ?
- President: André Kolingba

Minister of Social Affairs
- In office 10 February 1983 – 23 January 1984
- President: André Kolingba

Deputy Minister of Social Affairs
- In office 5 August 1982 – 10 February 1983
- President: André Kolingba

Deputy Minister of Youth and Sports
- In office 1 September 1981 – 5 August 1982
- President: André Kolingba

Personal details
- Born: 23 September 1948
- Died: 6 March 2019 (aged 70) Paris, France
- Children: 8
- Occupation: Basketball player Soldier; Physical Education Teacher; Politician
- Basketball career

Career history
- Yaounde University Club
- Zitouna Sports
- Hit Trésor SC
Medals
Event	1st	2nd	3rd
FIBA Africa Championship	1	0	0
Total	1	0	0
Men's basketball
Representing Central African Republic
FIBA Africa Championship
Gold medal – first place	1974 Central African Republic	

Brigadier general James Gaston Gambor (23 September 1948 – 6 March 2019) was a Central African military officer, basketball player, politician, and physical education teacher.

== Early life and education ==
Gambor was born on 23 September 1948. He enrolled in primary and secondary school as well as university.

== Career ==
=== Military career ===
Gambor joined FACA in 1968 as a cadet. He was promoted to officer cadet on 7 January 1975. Afterwards, his rank was elevated to second lieutenant on 1 March 1977. However, Bokassa degraded Gambor's rank to the rank of second-class soldier on 9 April 1977 because of a heated debate. Nevertheless, Gambor received rank promotion to captain, lieutenant colonel and eventually brigadier general on 1 December 2012. He also worked as a teacher at École de maintien de la paix (Alioune Blondin Beye Peacekeeping School) in Zambakro, Ivory Coast.

=== Basketball career ===
In 1971, Gambor played for the Yaounde University Club, where the club became the Cameroon's champions. Two years later, he reportedly played for Zitouna Sports and the club won the 1971 Championnat Pro A. In 1974, he became one of the Hit Trésor SC players. Gambor was included in the Central African Republic squad at the FIBA Africa Championship 1974, where he received the Best Player award. He also played for his country at the 1974 FIBA World Championship. Apart from that, he was included in the Africa basketball selection team at the Afro-Latin Games in Guadalajara and at the William Jones Cup in Madrid.

After retiring, Gambor was appointed as the president of Fédération Centrafricaine de Basketball in the 1970s. However, he was forced to resign by the sport minister, Jean Dominique N’Darata, on 24 December 2001 due to the Central African national team's poor performances on 2001 FIBA Africa Championship, although he was initially refused to do it. Other than that, he also founded the NGO named Sport Santé et Développement and served as the president of the African Association of Basketball Veterans and permanent representative of FACA to the International Military Sports Council.

=== Political career ===
During the Kolingba administration, Gambor served as deputy minister of youth and sports on 1 September 1981. He then was assigned to deputy minister of social affairs from 5 August 1982 to 10 February 1983. Afterward, he became the minister of social affairs on 10 February 1983 and served it until 23 January 1984. As a social affairs minister, he was accused of money embezzlement. One year later, he served as high commissioner for youth on 21 September 1985 and then as the minister of youth and sports on 11 December 1987.

Gambor resigned from his position as a minister of youth and sports in an unknown date and then was posted to the Central African Republic embassy in Paris. He also played a role in resolving the 1996 mutinies by becoming a mediator between pro-Patasse and mutineers. In October 2006, François Bozizé appointed Gambor as a member of Haut Conseil de la Communication. As a member of the commission, he drafted the Ordinance 005. Furthermore, he also served as the president of International Relations and Cooperation commission.

== Death ==
Gambor died in Paris on 6 March 2019. He received an official funeral in Camp Izamo, Bangui on 22 March 2019 where Faustin-Archange Touadéra attended it.

== Personal life ==
Gambor had eight children and belonged to Gbaya.

== Awards ==
- , Knight Order of Central African Merit - 24 December 1974.
- , Commander Order of Central African Merit.
- Commander order of Congolese Merit.
- Gold Medal Order of Central African Sports Merit.
- , Knight Order of Legion of Honour.
- Bamara Trophy - 2014.
- FIBA Africa recognition medal - 2018.

== Bibliography ==
- Bradshaw, Richard; Rius, Juan Fandos (2016). Historical Dictionary of the Central African Republic (Historical Dictionaries of Africa). Lanham: Rowman & Littlefield.
