= Oscar Tshiebwe =

Congolese basketball player (born 1999)

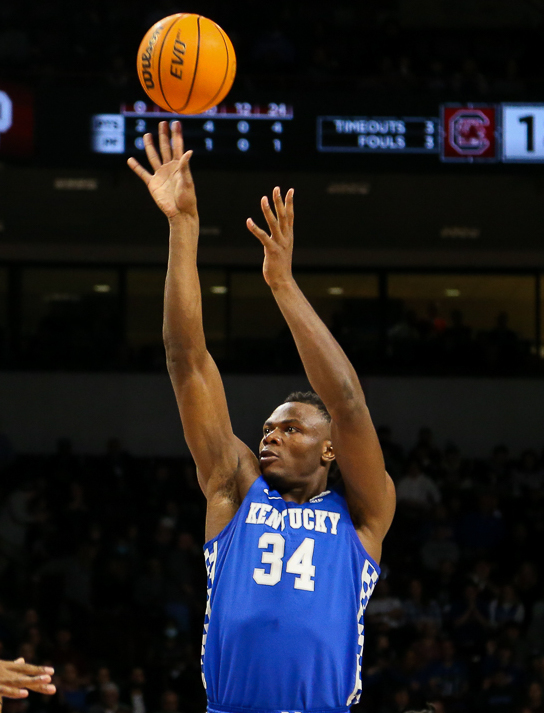
- Tshiebwe with Kentucky in 2022

No. 9 – Houston Rockets
- Position: Center / power forward
- League: NBA

Personal information
- Born: 27 November 1999 (age 26) Lubumbashi, DR Congo
- Listed height: 6 ft 8 in (2.03 m)
- Listed weight: 270 lb (122 kg)

Career information
- High school: Mountain Mission School (Grundy, Virginia); Kennedy Catholic (Hermitage, Pennsylvania)
- College: West Virginia (2019–2021); Kentucky (2021–2023)
- NBA draft: 2023: undrafted
- Playing career: 2023–present

Career history
- 2023–2024: Indiana Pacers
- 2023–2024: →Indiana Mad Ants
- 2024–2026: Utah Jazz
- 2024–2026: →Salt Lake City Stars
- 2026–present: Houston Rockets
- 2026–present: →Rio Grande Valley Vipers

Career highlights
- 2× All-NBA G League First Team (2024, 2025); NBA G League Rookie of the Year (2024); NBA G League All-Rookie Team (2024); 2× NBA G League rebounding leader (2024, 2025); NBA G League Next Up Game (2024); National college player of the year (2022); Consensus first-team All-American (2022); Consensus second-team All-American (2023); Pete Newell Big Man Award (2022); Kareem Abdul-Jabbar Award (2022); 2× NCAA rebounding leader (2022, 2023); SEC Player of the Year (2022); 2× First-team All-SEC (2022, 2023); Second-team All-Big 12 (2020); SEC All-Defensive Team (2022); Big 12 All-Newcomer Team (2020); McDonald's All-American (2019); Nike Hoop Summit (2019)
- Stats at NBA.com
- Stats at Basketball Reference

Oscar Tshiebwe (/ˈʃiːbweɪ/ SHEEB-way; born 27 November 1999) is a Congolese professional basketball player for the Houston Rockets of the National Basketball Association (NBA), on a two-way contract with the Rio Grande Valley Vipers of the NBA G League. He played college basketball for the West Virginia Mountaineers and the Kentucky Wildcats. In 2022, Tshiebwe was the consensus national player of the year.

== Early life ==
Tshiebwe grew up in Lubumbashi, Democratic Republic of the Congo. He played soccer as a child but was encouraged to start basketball because of his above-average height. Tshiebwe trained by running on hills and on a mountain near his hometown. He later attended a basketball camp led by Congolese NBA player Bismack Biyombo, who helped advance his career. Tshiebwe did not start playing basketball until May 2014.

== High school ==
Tshiebwe moved to the United States in November 2015, before his freshman year of high school, attending Mountain Mission School in Grundy, Virginia. Entering his junior year, he transferred to Kennedy Catholic High School in Hermitage, Pennsylvania. As a junior, Tshiebwe averaged 21.1 points per game and led his team to a Pennsylvania Interscholastic Athletic Association (PIAA) Class 1A title. He earned Class 1A All-State first team honors. In his senior season, Tshiebwe averaged 23.4 points, 18 rebounds, and five blocks per game, leading Kennedy Catholic to a 24–3 record and the PIAA Class 6A championship. He was a Class 6A All-State first team pick and was named Pennsylvania Gatorade Player of the Year. He averaged 21.6 points, 11.8 rebounds, and 3.1 blocks per game playing for ITPS Wildcats Select on the Adidas Gauntlet. Tshiebwe played in the McDonald's All-American Game and Nike Hoop Summit.

He was considered a five-star recruit by Rivals and 247Sports and a four-star recruit by ESPN. On October 20, 2018, he committed to play college basketball for West Virginia.

College recruiting
Name	Hometown	School	Height	Weight	Commit date
Oscar Tshiebwe; C	Lubumbashi, DR Congo	Kennedy Catholic (PA)	6 ft 8 in (2.03 m)	230 lb (100 kg)	Oct 20, 2018
Oscar Tshiebwe; C	Recruit ratings: Rivals: 247Sports: ESPN: (88)				
Overall recruit ranking: Rivals: 26 247Sports: 22 ESPN: 46
Note: In many cases, Scout, Rivals, 247Sports, On3, and ESPN may conflict in their listings of height and weight.; In these cases, the average was taken. ESPN grades are on a 100-point scale.; Sources: "West Virginia 2019 Basketball Commitments". Rivals.; "2019 West Virginia Mountaineers Recruiting Class". ESPN.; "2019 Team Ranking". Rivals.

== College career ==
=== West Virginia ===
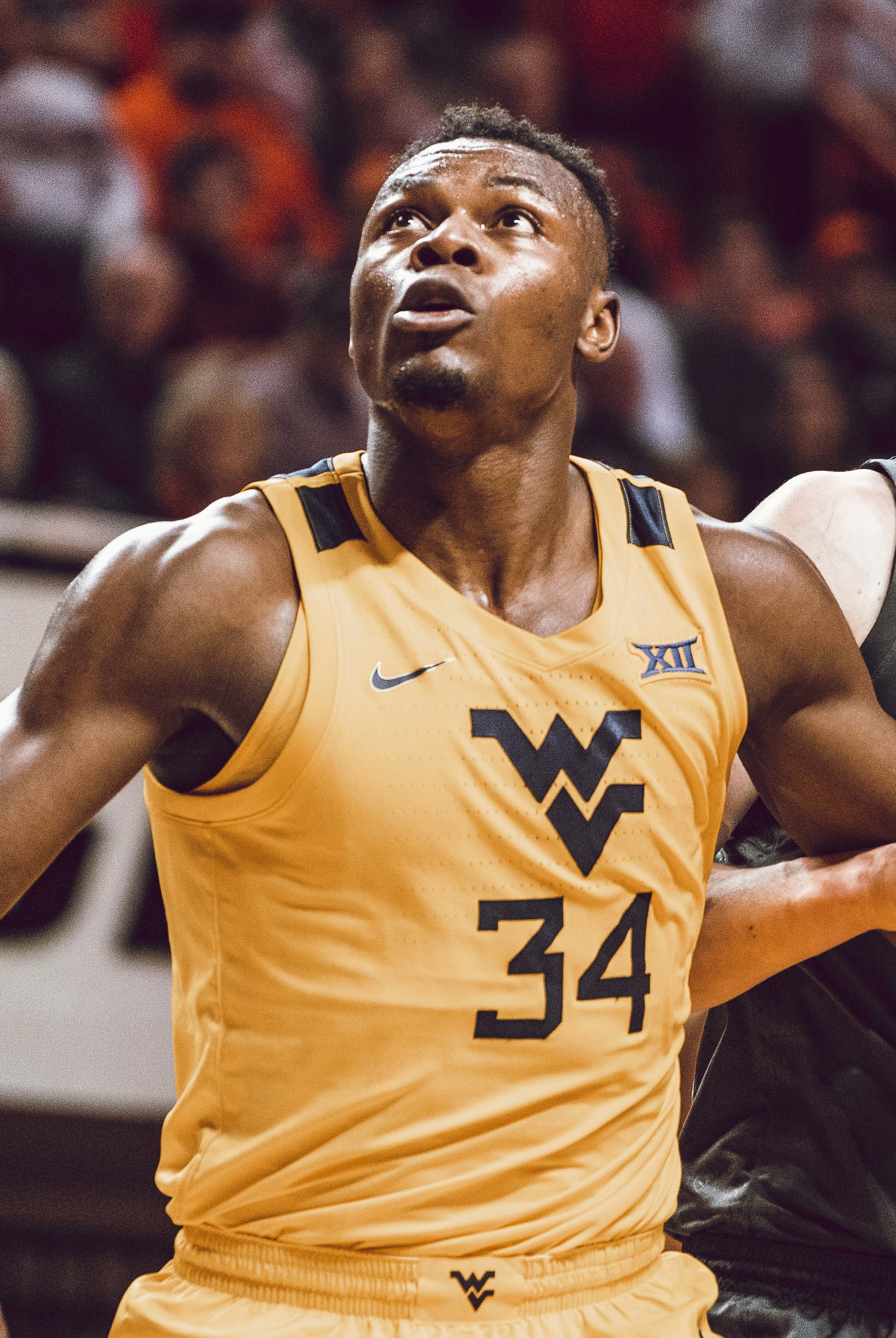
Tshiebwe with West Virginia in 2020

In his second college game, Tshiebwe had a double-double with 20 points and 17 rebounds at Pittsburgh. As a result, he was named Big 12 Newcomer of the Week. Tshiebwe had 19 points and 18 rebounds against Wichita State in the Cancun Challenge championship game, leading his team to victory and earning MVP honors. He was again named Big 12 Newcomer of the Week on December 2, 2019. At the conclusion of the regular season, Tshiebwe was named to the Second Team All-Big 12 and the All-Newcomer Team. Tshiebwe averaged 11.2 points and 9.3 rebounds per game as a freshman while shooting 55% from the field.

As a sophomore, he averaged 8.5 points and 7.8 rebounds through 10 games before leaving West Virginia for personal reasons.

=== Kentucky ===
On January 10, 2021, Tshiebwe transferred to Kentucky, after considering Miami, NC State and Illinois. In his debut for Kentucky, Tshiebwe tallied 17 points and 20 rebounds in a 79–71 loss to Duke. On December 22, he scored 14 points and grabbed a Rupp Arena-record 28 rebounds in a 95–60 win against Western Kentucky.

At the close of the season, Tshiebwe was named the Sporting News National Player of the Year, as well as the unanimous Southeastern Conference Player of the Year.

== Professional career ==
=== Indiana Pacers / Mad Ants (2023–2024) ===
After going undrafted in the 2023 NBA draft, Tshiebwe joined the Indiana Pacers for the 2023 NBA Summer League. On 3 July 2023, he signed a two-way contract with the Pacers, splitting time with their NBA G League affiliate, the Indiana Mad Ants. On 9 December, he made his NBA debut in the 2023 NBA In-Season Tournament championship game against the Los Angeles Lakers, and recorded his first regular-season point on 13 December, against the Milwaukee Bucks.

On 18 February 2024, Tshiebwe was selected to the 2024 NBA G League Next Up Game, along with Mad Ants teammates Isaiah Wong and Kyle Mangas, where his team was crowned champions. Tshiebwe also participated in the 2024 NBA Rising Stars Challenge at All-Star Weekend, where his team lost in the finals to MVP and Pacers teammate Bennedict Mathurin. On 2 April 2024, Tshiebwe was awarded the NBA G League Rookie of the Year Award after leading the league in rebounding and set a new NBA G League single-season rebounding record with 16.2 rebounds per game. In 2023–24, he recorded 27 double-doubles, seven games with 20-plus points and 20-plus rebounds, broke the record for most rebounds collected in an Indiana Mad Ants season, and broke the Mad Ants record for most rebounds in a game with 28. He was also selected to the All-NBA G League 1st Team, as well as the All-NBA G League Rookie Team.

=== Utah Jazz / Salt Lake City Stars (2024–2026) ===
On 12 August 2024, Tshiebwe signed a two-way contract with the Utah Jazz. On 28 March 2025, Tshiebwe made his first career start, recording seven points, 10 rebounds, one assist, and one steal in a 129–93 loss to the Denver Nuggets. He made 14 appearances (one start) for Utah during the 2024–25 NBA season, averaging 7.6 points, 8.7 rebounds, and 0.6 assists.

On 19 August 2025, Tshiebwe re-signed with the Jazz on a two-way contract. On 10 April 2026, Tshiebwe put up 16 points and a career-high 22 rebounds in a 147–101 win over the Memphis Grizzlies. Two days later, he recorded a career-high 29 points with 17 rebounds in a 131–107 loss to the Los Angeles Lakers.

=== Houston Rockets (2026–present) ===
On 24 July 2026, Tshiebwe signed with the Houston Rockets. On October 19, his contract was converted to a two-way contract.

== Career statistics ==
Legend
GP	Games played	GS	Games started	MPG	Minutes per game
FG%	Field goal percentage	3P%	3-point field goal percentage	FT%	Free throw percentage
RPG	Rebounds per game	APG	Assists per game	SPG	Steals per game
BPG	Blocks per game	PPG	Points per game	**Bold**	Career high

=== NBA ===
Year	Team	GP	GS	MPG	FG%	3P%	FT%	RPG	APG	SPG	BPG	PPG
2023–24	Indiana	8	0	5.2	.500	—	**.750**	2.0	.3	.3	.1	3.3
2024–25	Utah	14	1	**18.2**	.600	—	.742	**8.7**	.6	**.9**	.1	7.6
2025–26	Utah	**27**	**6**	16.6	**.634**	—	.551	6.6	**1.2**	.6	**.2**	**7.8**
Career		49	7	15.2	.613	—	.636	6.5	.9	.6	.1	7.0

=== College ===
*	Led NCAA Division I

Year	Team	GP	GS	MPG	FG%	3P%	FT%	RPG	APG	SPG	BPG	PPG
2019–20	West Virginia	31	31	23.2	.552	—	.708	9.3	.4	.7	1.0	11.2
2020–21	West Virginia	10	10	19.9	.523	—	.607	7.8	.7	.4	.4	8.5
2021–22	Kentucky	**34**	**34**	31.9	**.606**	—	.691	**15.2***	1.1	**1.8**	**1.6**	**17.4**
2022–23	Kentucky	32	30	**33.6**	.560	.000	**.729**	13.7*	**1.6**	1.6	1.0	16.5
Career		107	105	28.8	.573	.000	.705	12.3	1.0	1.3	1.1	14.5

== Off the court ==
=== Personal life ===
Tshiebwe is a Christian. After Tshiebwe began attending Kennedy Catholic High School, Jeff Kollar and his wife, who live near the school, became his legal guardians. Kollar and his wife were previously guardians of brothers Mohamed and Sagaba Konate, who both played basketball for Kennedy Catholic. Sagaba Konate also played college basketball for West Virginia.

Tshiebwe is a Kentucky Colonel.

=== Business interests ===
Tshiebwe has become a leading figure in name, image, and likeness (NIL) deals, despite being unable to take full advantage of his celebrity due to holding a student visa. While he is allowed to sign sponsorship deals, he cannot make paid personal appearances (including autograph signings and commercial shoots) while in the U.S. with that visa status. Tshiebwe's advisers are currently trying to change his visa status to "extraordinary ability", which would enable him to fully monetize his celebrity. In August 2022, he was temporarily freed from the restrictions of his visa when the Wildcats went on a week-long preseason exhibition tour to the Bahamas. When the team's plane landed in the Bahamas, Tshiebwe's first phone call was reportedly to his agent, asking "Where do you need me?", and he did promotional work for four companies before fully settling into his hotel room. During the Wildcats' down time on that tour, Tshiebwe made numerous photo shoots and advertising reads, and signed large quantities of memorabilia. Kentucky head coach John Calipari was apparently unfazed by Tshiebwe's off-court work in the Bahamas, reportedly telling The Athletic, "He can't do this stuff in the States. Oscar, you weren't there today, but we all get why you're doing what you're doing." By the end of the tour, he had reportedly made $500,000, bringing his total NIL money to $2.75 million in about six months. He used his first batch of NIL money to buy his mother a five-bedroom house, and has established a charitable foundation for the benefit of children in his homeland that is funded in large part by his NIL deals.
