= Martin Ngoko National Basketball Center =

Indoor arena in Bangui, Central African Republic

- Capacity: 4,500
- Type: Indoor arena
- Current use: Basketball

Construction
- Groundbreaking: 9 August 2023 (reconstruction)
- Rebuilt: 2023–2024
- Builder: Kefa Sports Ltd. (reconstruction)

The Martin Ngoko National Basketball Center (French: Centre national de basket-ball de Martin Ngokoh; abbreviated as CNBMN) is an indoor arena in Bangui, the capital of the Central African Republic.

The arena was the host venue of the FIBA Africa Championship 1974, the first to be hosted in the Central African Republic, and the first to be won by the national team. After it was not used for thirteen years, the arena was decided to be rebuilt. Basketball in the country had been underfunded, however Central African players such as Thierry Darlan and Kurt-Curry Wegscheider did well on the international stage, which led to the decision by FIBA and NBA Africa to fund the re-building of the arena. Construction began in August 2023 and included a complete demolition of the previous hall. The construction was led by Rwanda-based company Kefa Sports Ltd., and was completed by 2024. The new arena saw an improved capacity of 4,500 people.

The arena is named after former national team player Martin Nogko.
