= FIBA Africa Championship 1974 =

1974 FIBA AfroBasket
7th FIBA African Basketball Championship

Tournament details
- Host country: Central African Republic
- Dates: April 5-15
- Teams: 10 (from 34 federations)
- Venue: 1 (in 1 host city)

Final positions
- Champions: Central African Republic (1st title)

Tournament statistics
- MVP: (Central African Republic) Gaston Gambor
- Top scorer: (Senegal) Diop

The FIBA Africa Championship 1974 was hosted by the Central African Republic from April 5 to April 15, 1974. The games were played in Bangui. Central African Republic won the tournament, its first African Championship, by beating Senegal in the final. Central African Republic qualified for the 1974 FIBA World Championship by winning the tournament.

The tournament was hosted at the Martin Ngoko National Basketball Center in Bangui.

== Competing nations ==
The following national teams competed:

Group A	Group B
Benin; Mali; Senegal; Somalia; Togo; Tunisia	Central African Republic; Cameroon; Tanzania; Zaire

== Preliminary rounds ==
=== Group A ===
Team	Pts	Pld	W	L	PF	PA	Diff
Senegal	10	5	5	0	403	301	+102
Tunisia	8	5	3	2	309	290	+19
Togo	8	5	3	2	380	345	+35
Mali	8	5	3	2	369	331	+38
Benin	6	5	1	4	315	430	-115
Somalia	6	5	0	5	334	413	-79

Day 1

Tunisia	82–64	Benin
Togo	59–39	Somalia
Senegal	76–68	Mali

Day 2

Somalia	59–72	Benin
Tunisia	70–71	Mali
Senegal	78–68	Togo

Day 3

Somalia	43–63	Senegal
Mali	89–49	Benin
Tunisia	88–84	Togo

Day 4

Senegal	114–70	Benin
Mali	80–83	Togo
Tunisia	87–70	Somalia

Day 5

Togo	86–60	Benin
Senegal	72–52	Tunisia
Mali	61–53	Somalia

=== Group B ===
Team	Pts	Pld	W	L	PF	PA	Diff
Central African Republic	6	3	3	0	339	178	+161
Cameroon	5	3	2	1	281	180	+101
Zaire	4	3	1	2	267	265	+2
Tanzania	3	3	0	3	143	407	-263

Day 1

Central African Republic	66–64	Cameroon

Day 2

Cameroon	91–62	Zaire

Day 3

Zaire	123–59	Tanzania

Day 4

Cameroon	126–52	Tanzania
Central African Republic	115–82	Zaire

Day 5

Central African Republic	158–32	Tanzania

== Knockout stage ==
Semi-finals
April 14, 1974
Central African Republic	89
Tunisia	80
April 14, 1974
Senegal	84
Cameroon	78

Final
April 15, 1974
Central African Republic	72
Senegal	67
Third place
April 15, 1974
Tunisia	82
Cameroon	72

== Classification Stage ==
Togo	87–70	Zaire
Tanzania	37–151	Mali

== Final standings ==
Rank	Team	Record
1	Central African Republic	5-0
2	Senegal	6-1
3	Tunisia	4-2
4	Cameroon	2-3
5	Togo	4-2
6	Zaire	1-3
7	Mali	4-2
8	Tanzania	0-4
9	Benin (named Dahomey)	1-4
10	Somalia	0-6

Central African Republic qualified for the 1974 FIBA World Championship.

== Awards ==
Most Valuable Player
(Central African Republic) Gaston Gambor
