= Ghana men's national basketball team =

Ghana
- FIBA ranking: NR (3 March 2026)
- Joined FIBA: 1962
- FIBA zone: FIBA Africa
- National federation: Ghana Basketball Association (GBBA)

Olympic Games
- Appearances: None

FIBA World Cup
- Appearances: None

African Championship
- Appearances: None
Home	Away

The Ghana national basketball team represents Ghana in international competitions. It is administered by the Ghana Basketball Association (GBBA).

Ghana's senior national team has till date only played friendly games, despite its potentials and to the dismay of its fans. Ghanaian basketball players have played in some of the world's strongest leagues. The country does have a U-18 national team that competes at the FIBA Africa Under-18 Championship. Besides a youth national team, Ghana also features a 3x3 basketball team.

Ghana is Africa's most populous nation to never qualify for a major international basketball tournament, apart from youth and 3x3 basketball tournaments. They were scheduled to take part in AfroBasket 2021 qualification, with its group games being cancelled later.

Former logo

== Competitive record ==
=== Summer Olympics ===
never entered qualifying round

=== World Championship ===
never entered qualifying round

=== FIBA Africa Championship ===
never entered qualifying round

=== African Games ===
never entered qualifying round

== Notable players ==
Because of the unavailability of a national team, Ghanaian-born basketball players often opt to represent other national teams.

Current notable Ghanaian-born players include:

Ghana men's national basketball team roster
Players
Coaches

Pos.	No.	Name	Age – Date of birth	Height	Club
C		Amida Brimah	31 – 11 February 1994	2.13 m (7 ft 0 in)	Valencia	(Spain)
C		Nathan Mensah	26 – 4 September 1998	2.08 m (6 ft 10 in)	Maccabi Tel Aviv	(Israel)
F/C		Ben Bentil	30 – 29 March 1995	2.06 m (6 ft 9 in)	ASVEL	(France)
F		Akwasi Yeboah	28 – 15 June 1997	1.98 m (6 ft 6 in)	Trapani Shark	(Italy)
G/F		Billy Ouattara	33 – 24 January 1992	1.91 m (6 ft 3 in)	Paris Basketball	(France)

Legend

- Club – describes current club
- Age – describes age
  on 1 July 2025

== See also ==
- Ghana women's national basketball team
- Ghana national under-18 basketball team
