= Kennedy Catholic High School (Hermitage, Pennsylvania) =

Roman Catholic high school

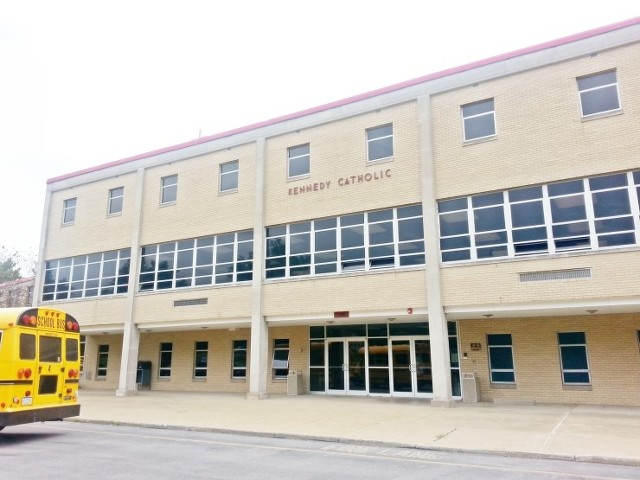
- The school around 2010

Location
- 2120 Shenango Valley Freeway; Hermitage, (Mercer County), Pennsylvania 16148; United States; 41°13′31″N 80°28′12″W

Information
- Type: Private, Coeducational
- Religious affiliation: Roman Catholic
- Established: 1964
- School district: Shenango Valley Catholic School System
- School code: 394502
- CEEB code: 394502
- President: Mr. Joseph Keneally
- Principal: Mr. Brian Bradish
- Grades: 9-12
- Colors: Maroon and Gold
- Athletics conference: PIAA District 10; Northern 8 Football Conference (Football only)
- Team name: Golden Eagles
- Accreditation: Middle States Association of Colleges and Schools
- Website: www.kennedycatholicschools.org/

Kennedy Catholic High School is a private, Roman Catholic high school in Hermitage, Pennsylvania. It is affiliates with the Roman Catholic Diocese of Erie. It is the only high school in the Shenango Valley Catholic School System. Their Nickname is the Golden Eagles, and they compete in the PIAA District 10 as a member of the Pennsylvania Interscholastic Athletic Association. For football, they compete in 8-man football as a part of the Northern 8 Football Conference with schools from Ohio.

== History ==
Opened in 1964, Kennedy Catholic High School serves students grades 9-12. At its current campus, they house students grades 7-12.

Kennedy Catholic was established in 1964, originally named Shenango Catholic Prep, but was changed to Kennedy Christian High School, to honor the death of the 35th U.S. President John F. Kennedy, who was assassinated in Dallas, Texas in November 1963.

Its first campus was located at the old Saint Bartholomew Elementary School in Sharpsville, Pennsylvania in the Fall of 1964. In the Fall of 1965, the Kennedy Catholic High School opened at its current site at 2120 Shenango Valley Freeway.

The school was renamed to Kennedy Catholic High School in 2001, by Bishop Emeritus Donald Trautman.

in 2011, Kennedy Catholic High School became the sole high school of the newly formed Shenango Valley Catholic School System along with Kennedy Catholic Middle School and Blessed John Paul II Elementary School, which were created from a consolidation of the St. Joseph's School and Notre Dame School.

== Athletics ==
Kennedy Catholic High School currently offers:

- Baseball
- Basketball
- Bowling
- Cheerleading
- Cross Country
- Golf
- Football (8-man)
- Soccer
- Softball
- Tennis
- Track and field
- Volleyball

=== Pennsylvania Interscholastic Athletic Association State Championships ===
Boys Basketball - 1986, 1987, 1998, 1999, 2000, 2001, 2016, 2017, 2018, 2019

Girls Basketball - 2001, 2023, 2024

== Notable alumni ==
- Michael Gruitza - former Pennsylvania House of Representatives member
- Joe Lombardi - former college basketball player and current coach
- Nolan Reimold - former professional baseball player
- Sean O'Brien - former member of the Ohio Senate and former Ohio House of Representatives member
- Sagaba Konate- professional basketball player in the National Basketball Association (NBA)
- Oscar Tshiebwe, professional basketball player in the National Basketball Association (NBA) for the Utah Jazz
