= Brigitte Affidehome Tonon =

Beninese basketball coach

- Born: 23 July 1974 (age 51)
- Citizenship: Beninese
- Education: PhD in Exercise Physiology from the University of Abomey-Calavi (UAC)
- Occupations: Researcher, author, basketball coach, former basketball player
- Known for: First woman in Africa to coach a men's national basketball team

Brigitte Affidehome Tonon (born 23 July 1974) is a Beninese researcher, author former basketball player and head coach of Benin men's national basketball team. Having coached Benin at the regional 2017 FIBA AfroBasket qualifiers, Tonon became the first woman in Africa to coach a men's national basketball team.

== Background ==
Tonon was born to Pierre Coffi Tonon, who as of 2017 was the Secretary General of the Federation Beninoise de Basketball (FBBB)

She has a PhD in Exercise Physiology from the University of Abomey-Calavi (UAC)

== Career ==
In 2017, Tonon was named head coach of the Benin men's national basketball team in 2017 and was in charge of the team during the 2017 FIBA Afrobasket Qualifiers in Cotonou where she coached the team to a 69-61 victory over Burkina Faso. Tonon works at the Benin Sports Institute in Porto Novo as a Coaches, Instructor

As a holder of a PhD in Exercise Physiology, Tonon is a published author on the same subject.

See also
