= Benin men's national under-16 basketball team =

Benin
- FIBA zone: FIBA Africa

World Championships
- Appearances: None

African Championships
- Appearances: None

The Benin national under-16 basketball team is a national basketball team of Benin, governed by the Fédération Béninoise de Basketball. It represents the country in international under-16 (under age 16) basketball competitions.

The team appeared at the 2009 FIBA Africa Under-16 Championship qualification stage.

== See also ==
- Benin men's national basketball team
- Benin men's national under-18 basketball team
- Benin women's national under-18 basketball team
