= Benin men's national basketball team =

Benin
- FIBA ranking: NR (13 July 2026)
- Joined FIBA: 1962
- FIBA zone: FIBA Africa
- National federation: Fédération Béninoise de Basketball (FBB)

Olympic Games
- Appearances: None

FIBA World Cup
- Appearances: None

African Championship
- Appearances: 1 (1974)
- Medals: None
Home	Away

The Benin national basketball team is the national basketball team representing Benin in international competitions. It is administered by the Fédération Béninoise de Basketball (FBB).

Benin had its best performance at the 1974 FIBA Africa Championship when it finished in Africa's Top Ten, ahead of Somalia.

== Roster ==
Team for the AfroBasket 2015 qualification.

Benin men's national basketball team roster
Players
Coaches

Pos.	No.	Name	Age – Date of birth	Height	Club
		Ayouba Aboubakari Aboudoulaye	29 – 1 January 1986			(Benin)
		Adéyinka Sege Prudence Adeossi	26 – 1 June 1989			(Benin)
		Tankpinou Moussiliou Ahivohozin	31 – 15 August 1984			(Benin)
		Romario Lacatus Y. Akpachi	21 – 15 October 1993			(Benin)
		Agnidé Khaled Mohamed Bouraima	28 – 28 January 1987
		Karim Damele	21 – 1 September 1993			(Benin)
		Moussa Diene	31 – 5 November 1983			(Benin)
		Cyde Junior Habib Dovonou	31 – 3 May 1984			(Benin)
		Aremou Naofall Folahan	25 – 28 June 1990
		Gérard Joël Oluwanife Gnimassou	27 – 11 March 1988			(Benin)
		Rafiou Issaka	21 – 18 December 1993			(Benin)
		Spéro Martin Simplice Kaneho	24 – 27 November 1990			(Benin)
		Vivien Cocouvi Tossou	21 – 30 November 1993			(Benin)
		Olaoumi Festus Worou	21 – 25 October 1993			(Benin)
		Tounde Kodjori Arnold Yacoubou	27 – 13 May 1988			(Benin)

Head coach

- ?

Legend

- Club – describes last
  club before the tournament
- Age – describes age
  on 19 August 2015

== Competitive record ==
Benin has never played any games in the Olympics, FIBA Basketball World Cup or African Games.

=== FIBA Africa Championship ===
AfroBasket record						Qualification record			
Year	Round	Position	GP	W	L	GP	W	L	–
(Morocco) 1964	Did not qualify								
(Tunisia) 1965	Did not qualify								
(Morocco) 1968	Did not qualify								
(Egypt) 1970	Did not qualify								
(Senegal) 1972	Did not qualify								
(Central African Republic) 1974	Preliminary round	9th	5	1	4				
(Egypt) 1975	Did not qualify								
(Senegal) 1978	Did not qualify								
(Morocco) 1980	Did not qualify								
(Somalia) 1981	Did not qualify								
(Egypt) 1983	Did not qualify								
(Ivory Coast) 1985	Did not qualify								
(Tunisia) 1987	Did not qualify								
(Angola) 1989	Did not qualify								
(Egypt) 1992	Did not qualify								
(Kenya) 1993	Did not qualify								
(Algeria) 1995	Did not qualify								
(Senegal) 1997	Did not qualify								
(Angola) 1999	Did not qualify								
(Morocco) 2001	Did not qualify								
(Egypt) 2003	Did not qualify								
(Algeria) 2005	Did not qualify								
(Angola) 2007	Did not qualify								
(Libya) 2009	Did not qualify					Did not enter			
(Madagascar) 2011	Did not qualify					6	0	6	2011
(Ivory Coast) 2013	Did not qualify					Did not enter			
(Tunisia) 2015	Did not qualify					2	0	2	2015
(Tunisia) (Senegal) 2017	Did not qualify					4	1	3	2017
(Rwanda) 2021	Did not qualify					Did not enter			
(Angola) 2025	Did not qualify					Did not enter			
Total	1/29		5	1	4	12	1	11	–

== Head coaches ==
- Brigitte Affidehome Tonon: (2017)

== See also ==
- Benin men's national under-18 basketball team
- Benin men's national under-16 basketball team
