= Amadou Thiam =

Malian politician and parliamentarian

- Born: March 21, 1984 (age 41)
- Occupation: Politician
- Organization: Democratic Forces for Prosperity in Mali

Amadou Thiam (born March 21, 1984, in Ségou) is a Malian politician who was elected the deputy in the National Assembly of Mali in 2014. He later became the second vice president of the Malian National Assembly.

He has been serving as the Malian Minister of Institutional Reforms and Relations with Civil Society since April 2019.

== Biography ==
Son of a diplomat, Amadou Thiam grew up in Ségou, Bamako and Accra and passed his Baccalaureate from the Achimota School of Ghana. He holds a Master's degree in administration from the University of Ghana Business School. Upon completion of his degree, he returned to Mali and joined the USAID Harmonized Education Strengthening Support Program (USAID/PHARE) as a communications officer. In 2011, he did a Diploma of Specialized Higher Studies (DESS) in Communication and completed his MBA in finance from ESG Paris in 2012.

After the 2012 coup in Mali, Amadou formally entered national politics. He was elected deputy of Commune V of the district of Bamako in the legislative elections of 2013, as a candidate for the ADP-Maliba party. He was the youngest deputy in the history of Mali in 2014 and also served as the second vice president of the National Assembly from 2014 to 2016.

In 2016, the draft amendment to the Malian constitution divided the political class and civil society and led to the birth of the platform Antè Abana: Touche pas à ma Constitution, a civil society movement. Amadou Thiam is part of the movement that opposes the modification of the constitution.

Following a series of disagreements with Aliou Diallo, founder of the ADP Maliba party and a 2018 presidential candidate, Amadou quit the ADP. Since April 2019, he has been the Minister of Institutional Reforms and Relations with Civil Society in the government of Boubou Cissé.

In August 2019, he announced the creation of his new party called Democratic Forces for Prosperity in Mali (FDP-Malikoura)

== International impact ==
Thiam is widely considered the youngest person ever to have been elected to the Malian parliament. According to Deutsche Welle, Thiam "is the youngest member of parliament in Mali's history", and is working "to give young people more of a say" in politics.

Radio France International reported that Thiam played a key role in criticizing the role of the French Army in killing Malian soldiers during a counter-terrorism raid. He demanded an investigation, noting that the French forces "are supposed to work in cooperation and in harmony with the armed forces of Mali".

== Honors ==
Amadou was awarded the honor of "Knight of the National Order of Mali" in 2018.

He was also named the Vice-Chairperson ad interim for Committee B at the Seventy-third World Health Assembly.

== Private life ==
Amadou Thiam is married and has 4 children.
