= Benin men's national under-18 basketball team =

Youth basketball team representing Benin

Benin
- FIBA zone: FIBA Africa
- National federation: Fédération Béninoise de Basketball

U19 World Cup
- Appearances: None

U18 AfroBasket
- Appearances: 3
- Medals: None

The Benin men's national under-18 basketball team is a national basketball team of Benin, administered by the Fédération Béninoise de Basketball. It represents the country in international under-18 men's basketball competitions.

== FIBA U18 AfroBasket participations ==
Year	Result
2014	8th
2016	11th
2022	8th

== See also ==
- Benin men's national basketball team
- Benin men's national under-16 basketball team
- Benin women's national under-18 basketball team
