= Ibrahima Diallo (basketball) =

Senegalese basketball player (born 1999)

No. 21 – Salt Lake City Stars
- Position: Center
- League: NBA G League

Personal information
- Born: 10 December 1999 (age 26) Saly, Senegal
- Listed height: 7 ft 0 in (2.13 m)
- Listed weight: 245 lb (111 kg)

Career information
- High school: Prolific Prep (Napa, California, U.S.)
- College: Ohio State (2019–2021); San Jose State (2021–2023); UCF (2023–2024)
- NBA draft: 2024: undrafted
- Playing career: 2024–present

Career history
- 2024–2025: Austin Spurs
- 2025–2026: Westchester Knicks
- 2026–present: Salt Lake City Stars
- Stats at Basketball Reference
Medals
Men's basketball
Representing Senegal
AfroBasket
Bronze medal – third place	2025 Angola

Ibrahima Diallo (born 10 December 1999) is a Senegalese professional basketball player for the Salt Lake City Stars of the NBA G League. He played college basketball in the United States for the Ohio State Buckeyes, San Jose State Spartans and UCF Knights. Diallo has played professionally for two seasons in the NBA G League.

== Early life ==
Diallo is a native of Saly, Senegal. He moved to the United States in 2016 to pursue a basketball career. Diallo played in 10 games for Prolific Prep during his senior season in 2018–19 where he averaged 11.3 points, 10.8 rebounds and 3.5 blocks per game. On 14 April 2019, he committed to play college basketball for the Ohio State Buckeyes.

== College career ==
Diallo spent the first two seasons of his college basketball career with the Ohio State Buckeyes and appeared in a total of 13 games. On 16 July 2021, he transferred to the San Jose State Spartans. Diallo averaged 6.0 points and 6.0 rebounds per game during the 2022–23 season. On 3 June 2023, Diallo signed with the UCF Knights. He was named as an All-Big 12 Conference Honorable Mention in 2024.

== Professional career ==
Diallo was selected by the Austin Spurs as the 13th overall pick of the 2024 NBA G League draft. He averaged 4.7 points, 5.4 rebounds and 1.9 blocks per game in 37 appearances for the Spurs during the 2024–25 season. Diallo played for the San Antonio Spurs during the 2025 NBA Summer League.

On 16 October 2025, Diallo was signed and waived by the New York Knicks of the National Basketball Association (NBA). He played for the Westchester Knicks of the NBA G League during the 2025–26 season and averaged 4.8 points, 5.3 rebounds and 2.0 blocks per game.

On 21 September 2026, Diallo's player rights were traded by the Knicks to the Salt Lake City Stars. On 23 September, Diallo was signed by the Utah Jazz of the NBA. He was waived the following day.

== National team career ==
Diallo won a bronze medal with the Senegal national basketball team at the FIBA AfroBasket 2025.
