= Zambakro =

- Village
- Location in Ivory Coast
- Coordinates: 6°44′N 5°25′W
- Country: Ivory Coast
- District: Yamoussoukro
- Department: Yamoussoukro
- Sub-prefecture: Yamoussoukro
- Time zone: UTC+0 (GMT)

Zambakro is a village in central Ivory Coast. It is in the sub-prefecture of Yamoussoukro in the Yamoussoukro Department of the Autonomous District of Yamoussoukro. The village sits on the eastern bank of the river that forms the boundary between the districts of Yamoussoukro and Sassandra-Marahoué.

Zambakro was a commune until March 2012, when it became one of 1,126 communes nationwide that were abolished.
