= Momo Faye =

Senegalese basketball player

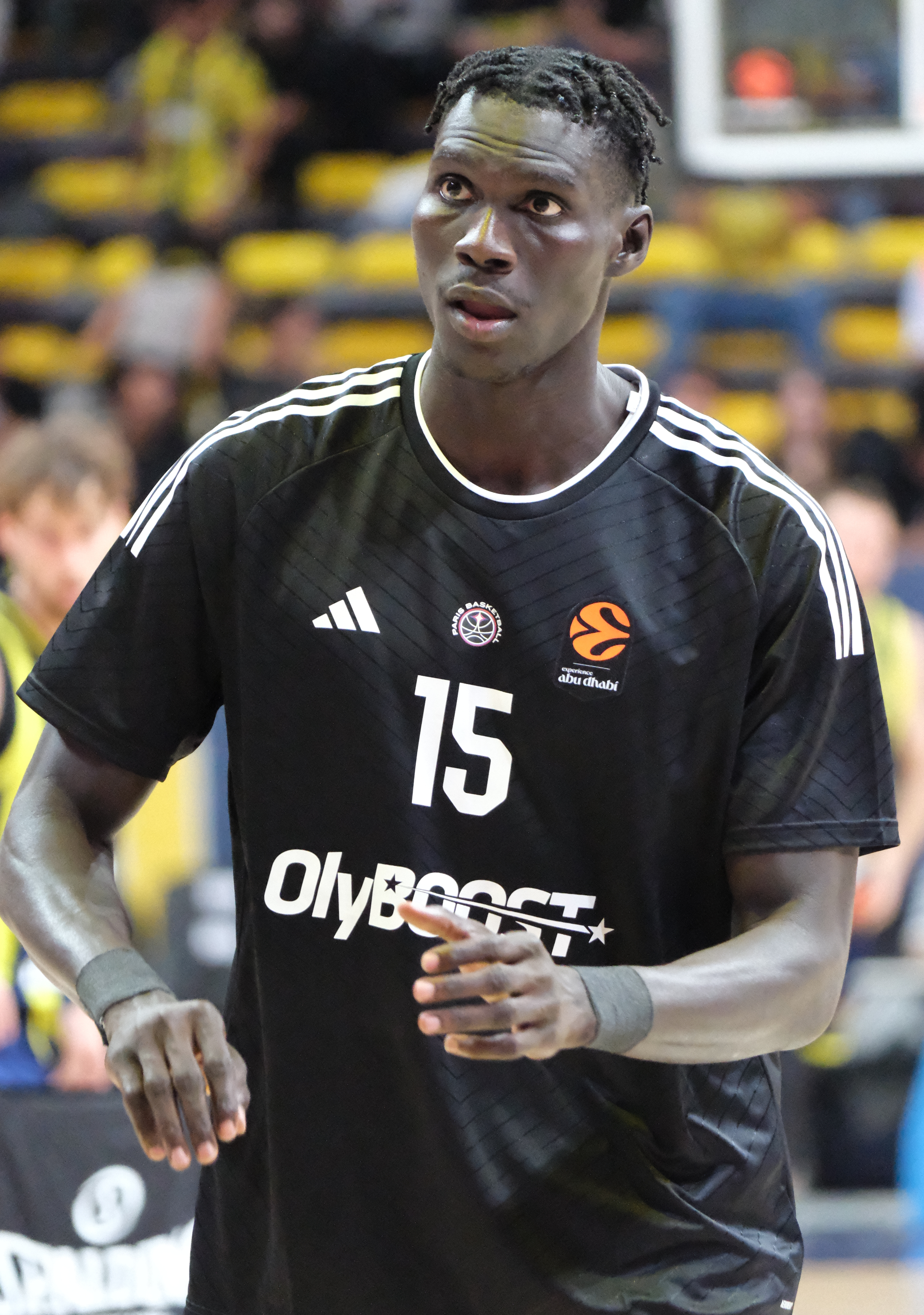
- Faye with Paris Basketball in 2025

No. 15 – Paris Basketball
- Position: Center
- League: LNB Élite; EuroLeague

Personal information
- Born: 5 February 2005 (age 21) Dakar, Senegal
- Listed height: 6 ft 10 in (2.08 m)
- Listed weight: 223 lb (101 kg)

Career information
- Playing career: 2023–present

Career history
- 2023–2025: Pallacanestro Reggiana
- 2025–present: Paris Basketball

Career highlights
- LBA Best Young Player (2024)

Mouhamed "Momo" Faye (born 5 February 2005) is a Senegalese professional basketball player for Paris Basketball of the French LNB Élite and EuroLeague. Born in Senegal, he moved to Italy and joined Reggiana at age 16, where he made his debut for the first-team in the 2023–24 season.

== Early life ==
Faye was born in Dakar, Senegal on 5 February 2005. He is one of three children, and has a brother and a sister. Faye grew up playing football in Senegal, often with his brother. Nearby the football field he played at was a basketball court, and after trying it out, he began training in the sport in 2018. He became a standout player in the area and in 2021, when he was age 16, he was noticed by Andrea Menozzi, a scout working for Pallacanestro Reggiana in Italy. He later left Senegal aged 16 to join Reggiana.

== Professional career ==
Faye impressed for the youth team of Reggiana in the 2022–23 season. He was then promoted to the main team during the 2023–24 season at 18 years old. He appeared in a total of 37 games for Reggiana with an average of 18 minutes per game, totaling 8.3 points, 4.9 rebounds and 1.2 blocks per game. After the season, he was given an award as the best player under the age of 22 in the Lega Basket Serie A (LBA). After the season, he initially entered his name in for the 2024 NBA draft, but he later withdrew from the draft on 15 June 2024, opting to return to Reggiana for the 2024–25 season. At the start of the 2024–25 season, Faye played for his club in the Basketball Champions League (BCL), where he became the youngest player in BCL history to have 15 points, five rebounds and five blocks in a game.

Faye signed with Paris Basketball in July 2025 and is one of the starters.

== International career ==
Faye competed for the Next Generation Team at the 2022–23 Euroleague Basketball Next Generation Tournament. He averaged 19.8 points there which included one game with 33 points.
