= Ghana men's national under-18 basketball team =

Ghana
- FIBA zone: FIBA Africa
- National federation: Ghana Basketball Association

U19 World Cup
- Appearances: None

U18 AfroBasket
- Appearances: 1 (2012)
- Medals: None

The Ghana men's national under-18 basketball team is a national basketball team of Ghana, administered by the Ghana Basketball Association (GBBA). It represents the country in international under-18 men's basketball competitions.

== FIBA U18 AfroBasket ==
So far, Ghana's only participation at the FIBA U18 AfroBasket was in 2012, where they finished in 8th place.

== See also ==
- Ghana men's national basketball team
