= Madagascar men's national under-19 basketball team =

Madagascar
- FIBA zone: FIBA Africa
- National federation: Fédération Malagasy de Basket-Ball

U19 World Cup
- Appearances: 1 (2023)
- Medals: None

U18 AfroBasket
- Appearances: 2
- Medals: (silver) Silver: 1 (2022)

The Madagascar men's national under-18 and under-19 basketball team is a national basketball team of Madagascar, administered by the Fédération Malagasy de Basket-Ball. It represents the country in international under-18 and under-19 men's basketball competitions.

== FIBA U18 AfroBasket participations ==
Year	Result
2014	5th
2022	2nd place, silver medalist(s)

== FIBA Under-19 Basketball World Cup participations ==
Year	Result
2023	14th

== See also ==
- Madagascar men's national basketball team
- Madagascar men's national under-16 basketball team
- Madagascar women's national under-18 basketball team
