= Achref Gannouni =

Tunisian basketball player

US Monastir
- Position: Guard
- League: CNA

Personal information
- Born: 16 April 1997 (age 29) Tunis, Tunisia
- Listed height: 1.92 m (6 ft 4 in)

Career information
- NBA draft: 2019: undrafted
- Playing career: 2015–present

Career history
- 2015–2022: Étoile Sportive de Radès
- 2022–2023: Étoile Sportive du Sahel
- 2023–present: US Monastir

Achref Gannouni (born 16 April 1997) is a Tunisian professional basketball player who currently plays for US Monastir and the Tunisian national team.

He represented Tunisia at the FIBA AfroBasket 2021, where the team won the gold medal.
