= Tiémoko Sangaré =

Malian politician

Tiémoko Sangaré (born 1957) is a Malian politician. He serves as the Malian Minister of Mines.
