= Sagaba Konate =

Malian basketball player (born 1997)

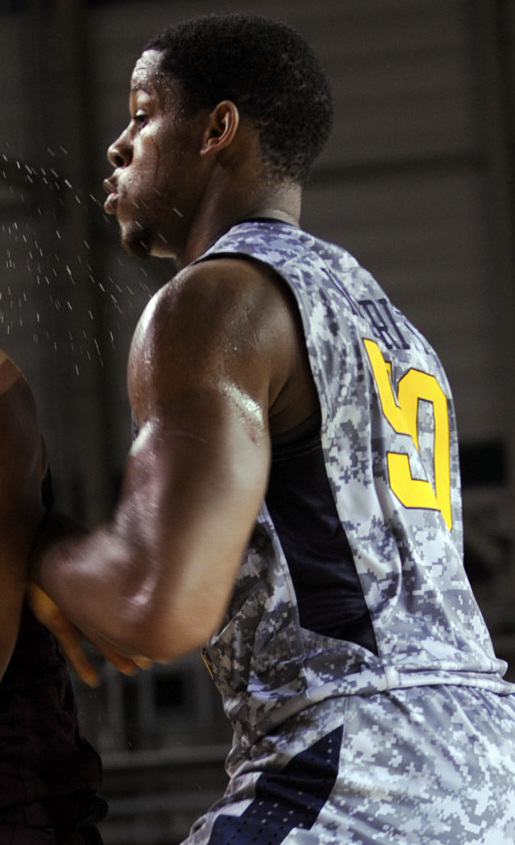
- Konate in November 2017

Free Agent
- Position: Center / power forward

Personal information
- Born: March 19, 1997 (age 29) Bamako, Mali
- Listed height: 2.01 m (6 ft 7 in)
- Listed weight: 118 kg (260 lb)

Career information
- High school: Kennedy Catholic (Hermitage, Pennsylvania)
- College: West Virginia (2016–2019)
- NBA draft: 2019: undrafted
- Playing career: 2019–present

Career history
- 2019–2020: Raptors 905
- 2020: Zaragoza
- 2020–2021: PAOK Thessaloniki
- 2021–2022: Trieste
- 2022–2023: ratiopharm Ulm
- 2023: Samsunspor
- 2024–2025: Körmend
- 2026–present: Zastal Zielona Góra

Career highlights
- Third-team All-Big 12 (2018); Big 12 All-Defensive Team (2018)
- Stats at Basketball Reference
Medals
Men's basketball
Representing Mali
FIBA Africa Under-18 Championship
Bronze medal – third place	2014 Madagascar

Sagaba Konate (born March 19, 1997) is a Malian professional basketball player playing as a center. He played college basketball for the West Virginia Mountaineers. A native of Bamako, he moved to the United States to play at Kennedy Catholic High School starting in his junior season. As a sophomore at West Virginia, he was named third-team All-Big 12 and made the conference All-Defensive Team.

== High school career ==
Konate, who grew up playing soccer, only started playing basketball in 2014. He credits his improvement to time spent in the weight room. Jeff Kollar and his wife became Konate's legal guardians as he attended Kennedy Catholic High School. At the high school level, Konate earned Player of the Year and All-State honors in Pennsylvania and was a three-star recruit entering college.

== College career ==
As a college player, Konate established himself as an expert shot-blocker, averaging 3.2 blocks per game in his sophomore year, which was 3rd in the nation for Division I. In addition, he averaged 10.8 points and 7.6 rebounds per contest. Konate flirted with the 2018 NBA draft, but ultimately withdrew his name and returned to West Virginia. During his junior year, Konate broke the WVU all-time record for blocked shots with 191. He spent most of the season sidelined due to a knee injury. After the 2018–2019 season, Konate declared for the 2019 NBA draft, forgoing his senior year.

== Professional career ==
After going undrafted, Konate signed with the Toronto Raptors of the National Basketball Association on July 23, 2019. He was waived and then added to the roster of their NBA G League affiliate, the Raptors 905. Konate fractured his metatarsal in the preseason but returned in January 2020. He averaged 4.7 points and 2.2 rebounds per game.

On August 20, 2020, Konate signed with Casademont Zaragoza of the Liga ACB. On November 29, 2020, Konate announced he had signed with Greek club PAOK Thessaloniki.

On June 25, 2021, he signed with Pallacanestro Trieste of the Italian Lega Basket Serie A.

On July 23, 2022, he has signed with ratiopharm Ulm of the German Basketball Bundesliga.

On July 21, 2023, he signed with Samsunspor of the Turkish Basketbol Süper Ligi (BSL).

On August 16, 2025, he signed with Bursaspor Basketbol of the Basketbol Süper Ligi (BSL). On September 4, 2025, the club announced that it had mutually parted ways with Sagaba Konate due to personal reasons.

January 2, 2026, Sagaba Konate joined Zastal Zielona Góra. He has a contract valid until the end of the 2025/2026 season.

== National team career ==
Konate has represented the under-20 Mali national basketball team, winning a bronze medal at the 2014 FIBA Africa Under-18 Championship.

== Career statistics ==
Legend
GP	Games played	GS	Games started	MPG	Minutes per game
FG%	Field goal percentage	3P%	3-point field goal percentage	FT%	Free throw percentage
RPG	Rebounds per game	APG	Assists per game	SPG	Steals per game
BPG	Blocks per game	PPG	Points per game	**Bold**	Career high

=== College ===
Year	Team	GP	GS	MPG	FG%	3P%	FT%	RPG	APG	SPG	BPG	PPG
2016–17	West Virginia	**37**	2	10.9	**.564**	–	.636	2.8	.3	.4	1.4	4.1
2017–18	West Virginia	36	**36**	**25.4**	.510	–	.790	7.6	.7	.4	**3.2**	10.8
2018–19	West Virginia	8	7	24.1	.435	**.391**	**.813**	**8.0**	**1.4**	**.8**	2.8	**13.6**
Career		81	45	18.7	.509	.391	.756	5.5	.6	.4	2.4	8.0
