= Alpha Touré =

Senegalese footballer (born 2006)

Personal information
- Full name: Alpha Amadou Touré
- Date of birth: 25 January 2006 (age 20)
- Place of birth: Kaolack, Senegal
- Height: 1.80 m (5 ft 11 in)
- Position: Defensive midfielder

Team information
- Current team: Metz
- Number: 12

Youth career
- Génération Foot

Senior career*
Years	Team	Apps	(Gls)
–2024	Génération Foot		
2024–	Metz	46	(0)
2024–	Metz B	5	(1)

International career^{‡}
2023	Senegal U17	4	(0)
- * Club domestic league appearances and goals as of 20 May 2026 ‡ National team caps and goals as of 22 November 2023

Alpha Amadou Touré (born 25 January 2006) is a Senegalese professional footballer who plays as a defensive midfielder for Ligue 2 club Metz.

== Club career ==
A versatile player capable playing in the midfield and defense, Touré is a product of Génération Foot in his native Senegal. On 12 July 2024, he signed for Ligue 2 club Metz on a contract until June 2028. He made his first start for the club in a 1–0 defeat away to Metz on 29 October 2024. On 29 May 2025, he scored an extra-time goal in a 3–1 play-off victory over Reims that secured Metz's return to Ligue 1.

== International career ==
Touré has represented Senegal at under-17 level, participating in the 2023 FIFA U-17 World Cup in Indonesia.

== Personal life ==
In July 2024, Touré obtained his baccalauréat with a mention of "fairly good".

== Career statistics ==
=== Club ===
As of match played 17 May 2026

Appearances and goals by club, season and competition
Club	Season	League			Cup		Continental		Other		Total	
Club	Season	Division	Apps	Goals	Apps	Goals	Apps	Goals	Apps	Goals	Apps	Goals
Génération Foot	2023–24	Senegal Ligue 1	—		—		2 (Note: Appearances in CAF Champions League)	0	—		2	0
Metz	2024–25	Ligue 2	16	0	2	0	—		3 (Note: Appearances in Ligue 1 relegation/promotion play-offs)	1	21	1
Metz	2025–26	Ligue 1	30	0	2	0	—		—		32	0
Metz	Total		46	0	4	0	—		3	1	53	1
Metz B	2024–25	National 3	5	1	—		—		—		5	1
Metz B	2025–26	National 3	0	0	—		—		—		0	0
Metz B	Total		5	1	—		—		—		5	1
Career total			51	1	4	0	2	0	3	1	60	2

== Honours ==
Génération Foot

- Senegal Ligue 1: 2022–23
