= Gabon men's national under-18 basketball team =

Gabon
- FIBA zone: FIBA Africa
- National federation: Fédération Gabonaise de Basket-Ball

U19 World Cup
- Appearances: None

U18 AfroBasket
- Appearances: 5
- Medals: None

The Gabon men's national under-18 basketball team is a national basketball team of Gabon, administered by the Fédération Gabonaise de Basket-Ball. It represents the country in international under-18 men's basketball competitions.

== FIBA U18 AfroBasket participations ==
Year	Result
1994	6th
2010	5th
2012	10th
2014	9th
2016	10th
2026	12th

== See also ==
- Gabon men's national basketball team
- Gabon men's national under-16 basketball team
