= 2008 FIBA Africa Under-18 Championship squads =

This article displays the rosters for the participating teams at the 2008 FIBA Africa Under-18 Championship.

== Algeria ==
Algeria men's national U18 basketball team – 2008 FIBA Africa Championship – 7th place roster
Players
Coaches

Pos.	No.	Name	Age – Date of birth	Height	Club	Ctr.
	4	Mohamed Harat	18 – 9 June 1990	1.98 m (6 ft 6 in)
	5	Fayçal Benamghar	18 – 20 August 1990
	6	Issam Kadiri	18 – 11 August 1990
	7	Adel Cherif	18 – 3 September 1990
	8	Fateh Sabaoui	18 – 5 August 1990
	9	Tarek Ali	17 – 20 July 1991
	10	Abderraouf Faïdia	16 – 4 December 1991
	11	Chemseddine Boumaza	17 – 3 January 1991
	12	Zakaria Guezout	16 – 30 July 1992
	13	Anis Fedala	18 – 8 January 1990
	14	Abdeldjabar Moulinou	18 – 6 June 1990
	15	Mohamed Zerouali	18 – 27 March 1990

Head coach

Assistant coach

Legend

- (C) Team captain
- Club field describes current club

== Angola ==
Angola men's national U18 basketball team – 2008 FIBA Africa Championship – Silver Medal roster
Players
Coaches

Pos.	No.	Name	Age – Date of birth	Height	Club	Ctr.
	4	Edson Ndoniema	17 – 11 February 1991	1.89 m (6 ft 2 in)	1º de Agosto	(Angola)
	5	Yanick Moreira	16 – 31 July 1991	1.98 m (6 ft 6 in)	1º de Agosto	(Angola)
	6	Bráulio Morais	17 – 17 December 1990	1.91 m (6 ft 3 in)	Petro Atlético	(Angola)
	7	Eduardo Ferreira	17 – 10 July 1990	1.92 m (6 ft 4 in)	1º de Agosto	(Angola)
	8	Josemar Carvalho	18 – 14 January 1990	1.76 m (5 ft 9 in)	CDUAN	(Angola)
	9	Hermenegildo Santos	17 – 16 August 1990	1.88 m (6 ft 2 in)	1º de Agosto	(Angola)
	10	Emanuel António	17 – 1 July 1990		CDUAN	(Angola)
	11	Edivaldo Cardoso	16 – 2 July 1991	2.04 m (6 ft 8 in)	Petro Atlético	(Angola)
	12	João Filho	15 – 1 June 1992	2.02 m (6 ft 8 in)		(Japan)
	13	Islando Manuel	17 – 7 January 1991	1.88 m (6 ft 2 in)	1º de Agosto	(Angola)
	14	Yuri Demba	18 – 3 January 1990		ASA	(Angola)
	15	Miguel Kiala	17 – 10 November 1990	2.02 m (6 ft 8 in)	CDUAN	(Angola)

Head coach

- (Angola) Carlos Dinis

Assistant coach

- (Angola) Jacinto Olim "Jabila"

Legend

- (C) Team captain
- nat field describes country

== Central African Republic ==
Central African Republic men's national U18 basketball team – 2008 FIBA Africa Championship – 9th place roster
Players
Coaches

Pos.	No.	Name	Age – Date of birth	Height	Club	Ctr.
	4	Christ Sokambi	16 – 25 October 1992
	5	Herland Wakiri	16 – 2 August 1992
	6	Patrick Omonoma	16 – 25 July 1992
	7	Kenny Naguidengar	18 – 24 January 1990
	8	Saggi Arafat	17 – 8 March 1991
	9	Olivier Topion	17 – 3 March 1991
	10	Wilfried Malikode	17 – 10 October 1991
	11	Tom Ngassio	17 – 7 October 1991
	12	Clovis Baker	16 – 5 January 1992
	13	Cornoy Mavoungou	16 – 1 September 1992
	14	Abdou Youssouf	16 – 31 January 1992
	15	Jimmy Djimrabaye	16 – 8 April 1992	2.04 m (6 ft 8 in)

Head coach

Assistant coach

Legend

- (C) Team captain
- Club field describes current club

== Congo ==
Congo men's national U18 basketball team – 2008 FIBA Africa Championship – 11th place roster
Players
Coaches

Pos.	No.	Name	Age – Date of birth	Height	Club	Ctr.
	4	Uther Moukimou	15 – 28 October 1992
	5	Japhie Nguia	16 – 24 March 1992	1.88 m (6 ft 2 in)
	6	Juste Ganogo	16 – 5 May 1992
	7	James Bopaka	16 – 17 January 1992
	8	Alix Ganga	18 – 27 September 1990
	9	Erich Diangala	15 – 4 December 1992
	10	Chanel Mpandzou	17 – 3 March 1991
	11	Dary Moutou	16 – 24 May 1992
	12	Joffrey Kandza	17 – 17 February 1991
	13	Darraul Badzioka	16 – 15 August 1992
	14	Benjeny Yoa	15 – 28 October 1992
	15	Olivier Matembili	16 – 25 September 1992

Head coach

Assistant coach

Legend

- (C) Team captain
- Club field describes current club

== Egypt ==
Egypt men's national U18 basketball team – 2008 FIBA Africa Championship – Gold Medal roster
Players
Coaches

Pos.	No.	Name	Age – Date of birth	Height	Club	Ctr.
	4	Motaz Okasha	18 – 14 February 1990	1.86 m (6 ft 1 in)
PF	5	Moustafa Hany	16 – 25 October 1992	2.03 m (6 ft 8 in)
	6	Amr Gendy	17 – 14 June 1991
	7	Mohamed Desouky	18 – 7 February 1990
	8	Adham Elsayed	16 – 25 November 1991
	9	Hady Elbeltagy	18 – 19 September 1990
	10	Moamen Mobarak	17 – 11 April 1991
C	11	Aly Mohamed	16 – 15 March 1992	2.05 m (6 ft 9 in)
SF	12	Zyad Mohamed	16 – 9 August 1992	2.00 m (6 ft 7 in)
	13	Ramy Hosny	17 – 5 January 1991
	14	Amr Abdelkader	17 – 1 January 1991	1.84 m (6 ft 0 in)
	15	Omar Oraby	17 – 8 September 1991

Head coach

Assistant coach

Legend

- (C) Team captain
- Club field describes current club

== Ivory Coast ==
Ivory Coast men's national U18 basketball team – 2008 FIBA Africa Championship – 6th place roster
Players
Coaches

Pos.	No.	Name	Age – Date of birth	Height	Club	Ctr.
	4	Sedji Kouzia	17 – 21 December 1990
	5	Kouadio N'Guessan	15 – 25 December 1992
	6	Abdoulaye Kourouma	15 – 30 December 1992
	7	Nangninlban Touré	17 – 3 January 1991
	8	Ghetty Allui	15 – 22 December 1992
	9	Daouda Camara	17 – 29 December 1990
	10	Aboubakar Dialo	17 – 9 December 1990
	11	Alassane Meite	17 – 21 September 1991
	12	Abdou Coulibaly	17 – 13 June 1991
	13	Abdoulaye Traoré	18 – 16 July 1990
	14	Kouassi Kesse	18 – 11 October 1990
	15	Jacques Kouassi	16 – 29 December 1991

Head coach

Assistant coach

Legend

- (C) Team captain
- Club field describes current club

== Kenya ==
Kenya men's national U18 basketball team – 2008 FIBA Africa Championship – 12th place roster
Players
Coaches

Pos.	No.	Name	Age – Date of birth	Height	Club	Ctr.
	4	Situma Khaemba	17 – 6 September 1991
	5	Romanov Wasula	16 – 25 April 1992
	6	Denis Wamukoya	18 – 26 June 1990
	7	Joshua Orwe	17 – 19 November 1990
	8	Augustine Wandiga	18 – 23 February 1990
	9	Anthony Opingo	18 – 21 March 1990
	11	Valentine Nyakinda	16 – 16 March 1992
	12	Erick Wafula	18 – 25 July 1990
	13	Erick Nyamai	17 – 2 December 1990
	14	Simon Misako	16 – 12 May 1992

Head coach

Assistant coach

Legend

- (C) Team captain
- Club field describes current club

== Mali ==
Mali men's national U18 basketball team – 2008 FIBA Africa Championship – 5th place roster
Players
Coaches

Pos.	No.	Name	Age – Date of birth	Height	Club	Ctr.
	4	Mahamadou Kante	16 – 2 March 1992	1.92 m (6 ft 4 in)
PG	5	Hamet Niane	17 – 12 August 1991
	6	Abdrahamane Maïga	18 – 11 January 1990	1.78 m (5 ft 10 in)
SG	7	Sidiki Maïga	18 – 30 June 1990
	8	Sorry Niambele	18 – 22 August 1990
	9	Mahalmoudou Haidara	15 – 8 November 1992
	10	Yaya Kouyate	16 – 11 November 1991
	11	Cheick Soumaoro	18 – 21 June 1990	2.07 m (6 ft 9 in)
SF	12	Mahamane Haidara	17 – 2 December 1990
C	13	Fofana Sega	18 – 15 January 1990
	14	Negueba Samake	18 – 28 January 1990
	15	Ibrahima Djimbe	16 – 15 December 1991

Head coach

Assistant coach

Legend

- (C) Team captain
- Club field describes current club

== Morocco ==
Morocco men's national U18 basketball team – 2008 FIBA Africa Championship – 8th place roster
Players
Coaches

Pos.	No.	Name	Age – Date of birth	Height	Club	Ctr.
	4	Hamza Zehouani	17 – 7 May 1991
	5	Youness Larifi	18 – 22 May 1990
	6	Zakaria Fatah	17 – 12 May 1991
	7	Adnane Srhir	18 – 4 January 1990
	8	Rachid Ja	16 – 18 January 1992
	9	Jihad Chlikha	16 – 6 January 1992
	10	Jihad Boulaakoul	18 – 14 January 1990
	11	Mohammed Boumkar	18 – 20 January 1990
	12	El Mehdi Joulal	18 – 22 January 1990
	13	Badr Er Rbyty	15 – 25 March 1993
	14	Amine Zariat	18 – 1 January 1990
	15	Ahmed Baddouh	16 – 20 April 1992

Head coach

Assistant coach

Legend

- (C) Team captain
- Club field describes current club

== Mozambique ==
Mozambique men's national U18 basketball team – 2008 FIBA Africa Championship – 10th place roster
Players
Coaches

Pos.	No.	Name	Age – Date of birth	Height	Club	Ctr.
	4	Manuel Uamusse	18 – 15 October 1990
	5	Helder Luís	18 – 7 March 1990
	6	Ivódio Macaringue	18 – 21 March 1990
	7	Ermelindo Novela	17 – 20 February 1991	1.84 m (6 ft 0 in)
	8	Orlando Novela	17 – 20 February 1991
	9	Tomás Fumo	18 – 29 August 1990
	10	Gregório Langa	18 – 14 January 1990
	11	Edson Honwana	18 – 29 August 1990
	12	Mauro Ngoque	18 – 17 February 1990
	13	Herth Mariote	18 – 12 April 1990
	14	Pedro Mourana	18 – 17 March 1990
	15	Joao Manhiça Jr	18 – 6 January 1990

Head coach

Assistant coach

Legend

- (C) Team captain
- Club field describes current club

== Nigeria ==
Nigeria men's national U18 basketball team – 2008 FIBA Africa Championship – Bronze Medal roster
Players
Coaches

Pos.	No.	Name	Age – Date of birth	Height	Club	Ctr.
	4	Seun Olanrewaju	15 – 3 December 1992
	5	John Okojie	16 – 22 September 1992
	6	Joshua Yomi	16 – 19 September 1992
	7	Haruna Sule	18 – 19 June 1990
	8	Jerry Edwin	18 – 15 October 1990
	9	Godsgift Achiuwa	18 – 20 May 1990
	10	Opeyemi Oyeniyi	17 – 10 October 1991
	11	Godwin Ikonshul	17 – 19 June 1991
	12	Prince Eze	14 – 28 December 1993
	13	Obumneme Onyia	17 – 19 November 1990
	14	Chris Francis	16 – 16 November 1991
	15	God'sPower Igben	17 – 30 September 1991

Head coach

- (Nigeria) Lateef Erinfolami

Assistant coach

Legend

- (C) Team captain
- Club field describes current club

== Senegal ==
Senegal men's national U18 basketball team – 2008 FIBA Africa Championship – 4th place roster
Players
Coaches

Pos.	No.	Name	Age – Date of birth	Height	Club	Ctr.
	4	M'Baye Thiam	17 – 3 October 1991
	5	Adama Adams	18 – 21 January 1990	1.80 m (5 ft 11 in)
	6	Mansour Kasse	16 – 28 June 1992
	7	Aboubacar Casse	17 – 7 February 1991
	8	Erick Diouf	17 – 17 April 1991
	9	Thierno Niang	18 – 8 March 1990	1.84 m (6 ft 0 in)
	10	Séllé Hann	18 – 10 June 1990
	11	Habib Ndoye	16 – 4 July 1992
	12	Papa Ndao	15 – 15 November 1992
	13	Cheikh Sané	16 – 4 May 1992
	14	Daniel Gomis	17 – 13 September 1991
	15	Papa Mbaye	18 – 13 June 1990

Head coach

Assistant coach

Legend

- (C) Team captain
- Club field describes current club

== See also ==
- 2009 FIBA Africa Championship squads
