= 2006 FIBA Africa Under-18 Championship squads =

This article displays the rosters for the participating teams at the 2008 FIBA Africa Under-18 Championship.

== Angola ==
Angola men's national U18 basketball team – 2006 FIBA Africa Championship – Bronze Medal roster
Players
Coaches

Pos.	No.	Name	Age – Date of birth	Height	Club	Ctr.
	4	Alfredo Simões	18 – 12 February 1988			(Angola)
	5	Paulo Barros	17 – 13 March 1989	1.95 m (6 ft 5 in)	Banca Cabinda	(Angola)
	6	Hélder Gonçalves	16 – 19 December 1989		G.D. Nocal	(Angola)
	7	Eduardo Ferreira	15 – 10 July 1990		1º de Agosto	(Angola)
	8	Hermenegildo Tandala	–			(Angola)
	9	Adilson Ramos	17 – 20 April 1989		Petro Atlético	(Angola)
	10	Simão João	17 – 1 January 1989		1º de Agosto	(Angola)
	11	Ezequiel Silva	17 – 25 November 1988		ASA	(Angola)
	12	Francisco Luano	17 – 3 July 1988		1º de Agosto	(Angola)
	13	Jackson Afonso	–		1º de Agosto	(Angola)
	14	Adalberto António	–		G.D. Nocal	(Angola)
	15	Valdelício Joaquim	16 – 15 April 1990	2.08 m (6 ft 10 in)		(Angola)

Head coach

- (Angola) Manuel Sousa "Necas"

Assistant coach

Legend

- (C) Team captain
- nat field describes country

== Congo ==
Congo men's national U18 basketball team – 2006 FIBA Africa Championship – 4th place roster
Players
Coaches

Pos.	No.	Name	Age – Date of birth	Height	Club	Ctr.
	4	Meryl N'Gampo	17 – 12 August 1988
	5	Franck Sow	18 – 16 April 1988
	6	Prince Nkakou	18 – 5 January 1988
	7	Olivier Wamba	18 – 2 July 1988
	8	Derick Louya	18 – 16 February 1988
	9	Arnold Damely	17 – 4 February 1989
	10	Serge Ibaka	16 – 18 September 1989	2.08 m (6 ft 10 in)
	11	Solira Nkouka	18 – 25 July 1988
	12	Christ Djio	17 – 12 December 1988
	13	Yannick Otina	18 – 2 January 1988
	14	Régis Akiana	18 – 27 June 1988
	15	Chanel Mbongo	18 – 16 July 1988

Head coach

Assistant coach

Legend

- (C) Team captain
- Club field describes current club

== Guinea ==
Guinea men's national U18 basketball team – 2006 FIBA Africa Championship – 5th place roster
Players
Coaches

Pos.	No.	Name	Age – Date of birth	Height	Club	Ctr.
	4	Mamadou Camara	17 – 19 August 1988
	5	Tidiane Sacko	17 – 9 December 1988
	6	Cheikh Sylla	18 – 25 May 1988
	8	Sékou Condé	17 – 20 June 1989
	9	Tidiane Kaba	18 – 12 July 1988
	10	Naby Camara	16 – 15 August 1989
	11	Albert Tounkara	17 – 26 February 1989
	12	Amara Conde	17 – 16 October 1988
	13	Ousmane Sanoh	17 – 14 August 1988
	14	Bangaly Sangaré	17 – 12 October 1988
	15	Sekou Soumare	16 – 20 November 1989

Head coach

Assistant coach

Legend

- (C) Team captain
- Club field describes current club

== Ivory Coast ==
Ivory Coast men's national U18 basketball team – 2006 FIBA Africa Championship – 7th place roster
Players
Coaches

Pos.	No.	Name	Age – Date of birth	Height	Club	Ctr.
	4	Abdul Dembele	16 – 6 November 1989
	5	Abdul Cisse	18 – 4 August 1988
	6	Serge Toubate	17 – 4 April 1989
	7	Haouet Toh	17 – 31 December 1988
	8	Konan Dja	16 – 15 July 1990
	9	Christian Kouakou	18 – 18 July 1988
	10	N'Dri Konan	16 – 4 March 1990
	11	Nouma Barou	17 – 25 August 1988
	12	Dagbolo Ouattara	17 – 28 December 1988
	13	Kouao Akasson	17 – 20 October 1988
	14	Sedji Kouzia	15 – 21 December 1990
	15	Kouassi Konan	15 – 15 January 1991

Head coach

Assistant coach

Legend

- (C) Team captain
- Club field describes current club

== Kenya ==
Kenya men's national U18 basketball team – 2006 FIBA Africa Championship – 9th place roster
Players
Coaches

Pos.	No.	Name	Age – Date of birth	Height	Club	Ctr.
	4	Mike Otula	14 – 5 December 1991
	5	George Oluoch	16 – 7 January 1990
	6	Tiberous Menya	16 – 14 February 1990
	7	Edwin Otula	17 – 17 May 1989
	8	Desmond Chawiyah	14 – 5 December 1991
	9	Augustine Munica	18 – 11 July 1988
	10	Moses Wanjara	15 – 28 December 1990
	11	Richard Otunga	17 – 21 June 1989
	12	Innocent Obiero	16 – 20 June 1990
	13	John Nyadaro	17 – 12 June 1989
	14	Antony Oduor	17 – 16 April 1989
	15	Philip Ameny	17 – 29 May 1989

Head coach

Assistant coach

Legend

- (C) Team captain
- Club field describes current club

== Mali ==
Mali men's national U18 basketball team – 2006 FIBA Africa Championship – Silver Medal roster
Players
Coaches

Pos.	No.	Name	Age – Date of birth	Height	Club	Ctr.
C	4	Souleymane Diarra	17 – 15 March 1989
	5	Samba Diop	16 – 14 May 1990
PG	6	Amadou Tangara	16 – 10 July 1990
SG	7	Sidiki Maïga	16 – 30 June 1990
	8	Waly Coulibaly	18 – 10 February 1988	1.90 m (6 ft 3 in)
PG	9	Gaye Daffe	18 – 13 June 1988
	10	Mahamane Toure	18 – 15 June 1988
C	11	Wodiouma Samake	16 – 30 December 1989
	12	Beydi Landoure	15 – 14 October 1990
	13	Cheikh Kone	17 – 19 August 1988
	14	Ali Dienepo	17 – 30 December 1988
C	15	Ibrahima Dembele	18 – 25 March 1988

Head coach

Assistant coach

Legend

- (C) Team captain
- Club field describes current club

== Mozambique ==
Mozambique men's national U18 basketball team – 2006 FIBA Africa Championship – 8th place roster
Players
Coaches

Pos.	No.	Name	Age – Date of birth	Height	Club	Ctr.
	4	Sidónio Xerinda	17 – 23 November 1988
	5	Nelson Jossias	16 – 21 August 1989
	6	David Canivete	16 – 9 August 1989	1.92 m (6 ft 4 in)
	7	Augusto Matos	15 – 29 November 1990	1.82 m (6 ft 0 in)
	8	Arsênio Júnior	18 – 11 June 1988
	9	Edson Monjane	17 – 2 February 1989	2.00 m (6 ft 7 in)
	10	Elton Mazive	17 – 8 November 1988
	11	Kevin Magane	15 – 26 January 1991
	12	Ivaldo Costa	17 – 1 October 1988
	13	Joaquim Paulino	17 – 21 September 1988
	14	Pedro Mourana	16 – 17 March 1990
	15	José Gudo	17 – 2 February 1989

Head coach

Assistant coach

Legend

- (C) Team captain
- Club field describes current club

== Nigeria ==
Nigeria men's national U18 basketball team – 2006 FIBA Africa Championship – Gold Medal roster
Players
Coaches

Pos.	No.	Name	Age – Date of birth	Height	Club	Ctr.
PG	4	Daniel Daudu	16 – 22 October 1989
	5	Ahmed Ayodele	17 – 18 July 1989
SG	6	Ibrahim Yusuf	17 – 4 May 1989	1.96 m (6 ft 5 in)
	7	Abel Baraya	18 – 23 April 1988
	8	Faruk Oyalade	16 – 31 December 1989
SF	9	Orseer Ikyaator	16 – 9 September 1989	1.95 m (6 ft 5 in)
SG	10	Nosa Omorogbe	16 – 23 December 1989
SF	11	George Ehiagwina	17 – 4 February 1989
	12	Mbaram Omori	17 – 10 August 1988
	13	Oluwaseyi Ayodele	18 – 14 February 1988
	14	Franck Eze	16 – 26 August 1989
	15	Solomon Alabi	18 – 21 March 1988	2.15 m (7 ft 1 in)

Head coach

Assistant coach

Legend

- (C) Team captain
- Club field describes current club

== South Africa ==
South Africa men's national U18 basketball team – 2006 FIBA Africa Championship – 6th place roster
Players
Coaches

Pos.	No.	Name	Age – Date of birth	Height	Club	Ctr.
	4	Sivuyile Mdekazi	16 – 14 January 1990
	5	Celumusa Khumalo	17 – 8 September 1988
	6	Luyanda Nsibande	18 – 25 March 1988
	7	Vusimuzi Sithole	18 – 9 May 1988
	8	Sandiso Manqele	18 – 2 April 1988
	9	Marco Samuels	16 – 22 June 1990
	10	Nkululeko Gumede	16 – 9 November 1989
	11	Michael Acutt	18 – 19 January 1988
	12	Byron Egan	18 – 7 March 1988
	13	André du Plessis	18 – 14 January 1988
	14	Isaac Selelane	18 – 22 March 1988
	15	Sakhile Sithole	16 – 11 March 1990

Head coach

Assistant coach

Legend

- (C) Team captain
- Club field describes current club

== See also ==
- 2007 FIBA Africa Championship squads
