= 2026 FIBA U18 AfroBasket =

22nd FIBA Under-18 African Basketball Championship

Tournament details
- Host country: Ivory Coast
- City: Abidjan
- Dates: 5−16 August
- Teams: 12 (from 1 confederation)
- Venues: 2 (in 1 host city)

Final positions
- Champions: Ivory Coast (1st title)
- Runners-up: Senegal
- Third place: Cameroon
- Fourth place: Mali

Tournament statistics
- MVP: (Ivory Coast) Nathan Djako

Official website
- www.fiba.basketball

The 2026 FIBA U18 AfroBasket was the 22nd edition of the African basketball championship for men's under-18 national teams. The tournament was played in Treichville (Abidjan), Ivory Coast, from 5 to 16 August 2026. This was the first time that Ivory Coast organized this event.

This tournament also served as the FIBA Africa's qualifier for the 2027 FIBA Under-19 Basketball World Cup in the Czech Republic, where the top two teams qualified.

Host Ivory Coast secured their first ever title with a victory over Senegal in the final, 73–51.

== Qualification ==
=== Qualified teams ===
Includes current world ranking prior to the start of the tournament (in parentheses).

- Host nation (1)
  - Ivory Coast (23)
- Zone I
  - Morocco (48)
  - Tunisia (59)
- Zone II
  - Mali (17)
  - Senegal (36)
- Zone III
  - Nigeria (51)
- Zone IV
  - Cameroon (27)
  - Chad (67)
  - Gabon (NR)
- Zone V
  - Egypt (25)
  - Rwanda (55)
- Zone VI
  - N/A
- Zone VII
  - Madagascar (35)

== Group phase ==
The draw of the group phase took place on 2 August 2026 in Ivory Coast.

In this round, the teams were drawn into three groups of four. The top two teams from each group and the best two third-placed teams advanced to the quarterfinals; the other teams were dropped to the 9th–12th place playoffs.

All times are local (Greenwich Mean Time; UTC+00:00).

=== Group A ===
Pos	Team	Pld	W	L	PF	PA	PD	Pts	Qualification
1	Ivory Coast (H)	3	3	0	270	181	+89	6	Quarterfinals
2	Chad	3	2	1	183	207	−24	5	Quarterfinals
3	Egypt	3	1	2	210	230	−20	4	Quarterfinals
4	Nigeria	3	0	3	186	231	−45	3	9th–12th place playoffs

Source: FIBA Africa
Rules for classification: 1) Points; 2) Head-to-head results; 3) Points difference; 4) Points scored.
(H) Hosts

5 August 2026
15:00

Boxscore

Egypt	95–68	Nigeria
Scoring by quarter: 32–23, 24–20, 23–12, 16–13

Palais des Sports de Treichville

5 August 2026
18:30

Boxscore

Ivory Coast	104–51	Chad
Scoring by quarter: 31–14, 24–12, 19–8, 30–17

Palais des Sports de Treichville

7 August 2026
12:00

Boxscore

Chad	59–50	Nigeria
Scoring by quarter: 11–12, 18–11, 19–15, 11–12

Palais des Sports de Treichville

7 August 2026
17:00

Boxscore

Ivory Coast	89–62	Egypt
Scoring by quarter: 21–17, 23–13, 22–12, 23–20

Palais des Sports de Treichville

9 August 2026
14:30

Boxscore

Egypt	53–73	Chad
Scoring by quarter: 20–23, 12–16, 11–10, 10–24

Palais des Sports de Treichville

9 August 2026
17:00

Boxscore

Nigeria	68–77	Ivory Coast
Scoring by quarter: 21–17, 10–20, 21–23, 16–17

Palais des Sports de Treichville

=== Group B ===
Pos	Team	Pld	W	L	PF	PA	PD	Pts	Qualification
1	Mali	3	3	0	232	126	+106	6	Quarterfinals
2	Madagascar	3	2	1	171	166	+5	5	Quarterfinals
3	Gabon	3	1	2	169	243	−74	4	9th–12th place playoffs
4	Morocco	3	0	3	155	192	−37	3	9th–12th place playoffs

Source: FIBA Africa
Rules for classification: 1) Points; 2) Head-to-head results; 3) Points difference; 4) Points scored.

5 August 2026
10:00

Boxscore

Madagascar	68–65	Gabon
Scoring by quarter: 19–17, 8–20, 24–11, 17–17

Palais des Sports de Treichville

5 August 2026
12:30

Boxscore

Morocco	45–66	Mali
Scoring by quarter: 11–18, 11–18, 14–14, 9–16

Palais des Sports de Treichville

7 August 2026
14:30

Boxscore

Mali	113–37	Gabon
Scoring by quarter: 39–9, 20–6, 26–4, 28–18

Palais des Sports de Treichville

7 August 2026
19:30

Boxscore

Madagascar	59–48	Morocco
Scoring by quarter: 14–14, 11–8, 13–12, 21–14

Palais des Sports de Treichville

9 August 2026
12:00

Boxscore

Gabon	67–62	Morocco
Scoring by quarter: 15–27, 22–6, 9–17, 21–12

Palais des Sports de Treichville

9 August 2026
19:30

Boxscore

Mali	53–44	Madagascar
Scoring by quarter: 11–1, 9–22, 20–11, 13–10

Palais des Sports de Treichville

=== Group C ===
Pos	Team	Pld	W	L	PF	PA	PD	Pts	Qualification
1	Cameroon	3	3	0	178	145	+33	6	Quarterfinals
2	Senegal	3	2	1	179	121	+58	5	Quarterfinals
3	Tunisia	3	1	2	135	161	−26	4	Quarterfinals
4	Rwanda	3	0	3	149	214	−65	3	9th–12th place playoffs

Source: FIBA Africa
Rules for classification: 1) Points; 2) Head-to-head results; 3) Points difference; 4) Points scored.

6 August 2026
14:30

Boxscore

Cameroon	53–41	Tunisia
Scoring by quarter: 15–2, 16–18, 8–6, 14–15

Palais des Sports de Treichville
Attendance: 100

6 August 2026
17:00

Boxscore

Rwanda	38–78	Senegal
Scoring by quarter: 10–24, 7–24, 11–17, 10–13

Palais des Sports de Treichville
Attendance: 100

8 August 2026
14:30

Boxscore

Cameroon	76–58	Rwanda
Scoring by quarter: 28–12, 8–10, 28–17, 12–19

Palais des Sports de Treichville

8 August 2026
17:00

Boxscore

Tunisia	34–55	Senegal
Scoring by quarter: 11–11, 10–16, 4–15, 9–13

Palais des Sports de Treichville

10 August 2026
14:30

Boxscore

Tunisia	60–53	Rwanda
Scoring by quarter: 16–6, 12–18, 23–18, 9–11

Palais des Sports de Treichville
Attendance: 100

10 August 2026
17:00

Boxscore

Senegal	46–49	Cameroon
Scoring by quarter: 8–12, 10–16, 15–8, 13–13

Palais des Sports de Treichville
Attendance: 200

== Group phase overall ranking ==
Rank	Team
1	Mali
2	Ivory Coast
3	Cameroon
4	Senegal
5	Madagascar
6	Chad
7	Egypt
8	Tunisia
9	Gabon
10	Morocco
11	Nigeria
12	Rwanda

Advanced to quarterfinals
Dropped to 9th–12th place playoffs

== 9th–12th place playoffs ==
9th–12th place semifinals
9	Gabon	83
12	Rwanda	88
10	Morocco	76
11	Nigeria	84

9th place game
Rwanda	48
Nigeria	75
11th place game
Gabon	67
Morocco	94

=== 9th–12th place semifinals ===
12 August 2026
18:00

Boxscore

Morocco	76–84	Nigeria
Scoring by quarter: 17–16, 20–14, 23–31, 16–23

Salle Polyvalente, Treichville
Attendance: 100

12 August 2026
20:30

Boxscore

Gabon	83–88	Rwanda
Scoring by quarter: 19–20, 14–19, 9–22, 41–27

Salle Polyvalente, Treichville
Attendance: 100

==== 11th place game ====
13 August 2026
15:30

Boxscore

Gabon	67–94	Morocco
Scoring by quarter: 22–25, 15–18, 13–26, 17–25

Salle Polyvalente, Treichville
Attendance: 50

==== 9th place game ====
13 August 2026
20:30

Boxscore

Rwanda	48–75	Nigeria
Scoring by quarter: 19–18, 11–26, 8–12, 10–19

Salle Polyvalente, Treichville
Attendance: 100

== Championship playoffs ==
5th place game
Tunisia	70
Egypt	68
7th place game
Madagascar	69
Chad	42

5th–8th place semifinals
Tunisia	86
Madagascar	51
Egypt	65
Chad	59

Quarterfinals
1	Mali	66
8	Tunisia	55
4	Senegal	54
5	Madagascar	40
2	Ivory Coast	67
7	Egypt	57
3	Cameroon	77
6	Chad	49

Semifinals
Mali	51
Senegal	55
Ivory Coast	62
Cameroon	57

Final
Senegal	51
Ivory Coast	73
3rd place game
Mali	69
Cameroon	73

=== Quarterfinals ===
13 August 2026
13:00

Boxscore

Mali	66–55	Tunisia
Scoring by quarter: 19–18, 14–7, 23–8, 10–22

Palais des Sports de Treichville
Attendance: 200

13 August 2026
15:30

Boxscore

Senegal	54–40	Madagascar
Scoring by quarter: 15–9, 8–12, 18–4, 13–15

Palais des Sports de Treichville
Attendance: 200

13 August 2026
18:00

Boxscore

Ivory Coast	67–57	Egypt
Scoring by quarter: 21–13, 22–16, 12–18, 12–10

Palais des Sports de Treichville
Attendance: 1,000

13 August 2026
20:30

Boxscore

Cameroon	77–49	Chad
Scoring by quarter: 18–18, 14–11, 18–14, 27–6

Palais des Sports de Treichville
Attendance: 200

=== 5th–8th place semifinals ===
14 August 2026
15:30

Boxscore

Tunisia	86–51	Madagascar
Scoring by quarter: 21–12, 20–19, 23–8, 22–12

Salle Polyvalente, Treichville
Attendance: 100

14 August 2026
20:30

Boxscore

Egypt	65–59	Chad
Scoring by quarter: 23–17, 15–22, 11–10, 16–10

Salle Polyvalente, Treichville
Attendance: 100

==== 7th place game ====
15 August 2026
15:30

Boxscore

Madagascar	69–42	Chad
Scoring by quarter: 18–14, 20–10, 19–12, 12–6

Salle Polyvalente, Treichville
Attendance: 100

==== 5th place game ====
15 August 2026
20:30

Boxscore

Tunisia	70–68	Egypt
Scoring by quarter: 15–12, 17–18, 17–28, 21–10

Salle Polyvalente, Treichville
Attendance: 100

=== Semifinals ===
15 August 2026
15:00

Boxscore

Mali	51–55	Senegal
Scoring by quarter: 13–23, 8–11, 16–13, 14–8

Palais des Sports de Treichville
Attendance: 500

15 August 2026
18:00

Boxscore

Ivory Coast	62–57	Cameroon
Scoring by quarter: 16–10, 19–22, 17–15, 10–10

Palais des Sports de Treichville
Attendance: 1,000

==== 3rd place game ====
16 August 2026
14:00

Boxscore

Mali	69–73	Cameroon
Scoring by quarter: 13–20, 16–21, 16–18, 24–14

Palais des Sports de Treichville
Attendance: 100

==== Final ====
16 August 2026
20:00

Boxscore

Senegal	51–73	Ivory Coast
Scoring by quarter: 7–16, 17–18, 10–21, 17–18

Palais des Sports de Treichville
Attendance: 4,000

== Final standings ==
Rank	Team	Record
1st place, gold medalist(s)	Ivory Coast	6–0
2nd place, silver medalist(s)	Senegal	4–2
3rd place, bronze medalist(s)	Cameroon	5–1
4	Mali	4–2
5	Tunisia	3–3
6	Egypt	2–4
7	Madagascar	3–3
8	Chad	2–4
9	Nigeria	2–3
10	Rwanda	1–4
11	Morocco	1–4
12	Gabon	1–4

Qualified for the 2027 FIBA Under-19 Basketball World Cup
