= 2024 FIBA U18 AfroBasket =

21st FIBA Under-18 African Basketball Championship

Tournament details
- Host country: South Africa
- City: Pretoria
- Dates: 3−14 September
- Teams: 12 (from 1 confederation)
- Venues: 2 (in 1 host city)

Final positions
- Champions: Mali (3rd title)
- Runners-up: Cameroon
- Third place: Senegal
- Fourth place: Morocco

Official website
- www.fiba.basketball

The 2024 FIBA U18 AfroBasket was the 21st edition of the African basketball championship for men's under-18 national teams. The tournament was played in Pretoria, South Africa, from 3 to 14 September 2024. This was the second time South Africa has hosted the tournament; the previous one was in 2006.

This tournament also served as the FIBA Africa's qualifier for the 2025 FIBA Under-19 Basketball World Cup in Switzerland, where the top two teams qualified.

Mali secured their third overall title with a victory over Cameroon in the final, 60–51.

== Qualification ==
Means of qualification	Dates	Venue	Berths	Qualifiers
Host nation	N/A	N/A	1	South Africa
2022 FIBA U18 African Championship Top Four	4–14 December 2022	(Madagascar) Antananarivo	3	Egypt; ~~Madagascar~~; Mali; Angola
2024 Zone I U18 Qualifiers	11–14 July 2024	(Tunisia) Tunis	1	Morocco
2024 Zone II U18 Qualifiers	N/A	N/A	1	Senegal
2024 Zone III U18 Qualifiers	31 July–4 August 2024	(Ivory Coast) Abidjan	1	Nigeria
2024 Zone IV U18 Qualifiers	N/A	N/A	1	Cameroon
2024 Zone V U18 Qualifiers	9–14 June 2024	(Uganda) Kampala	1	Uganda
2024 Zone VI U18 Qualifiers	28–29 June 2024	(Zambia) Lusaka	1	Zambia
2024 Zone VII U18 Qualifiers	N/A	N/A	N/A	N/A
Wildcards	9 August 2024	N/A	2	Ivory Coast; Rwanda
Total			12	

=== Qualified teams ===
Includes current world ranking prior to the start of the tournament (in parentheses).

- Host nation (1)
  - South Africa (NR)
- Zone I
  - Morocco (60)
- Zone II
  - Mali (18)
  - Senegal (21)
- Zone III
  - Ivory Coast (54)
  - Nigeria (NR)
- Zone IV
  - Cameroon (NR)
- Zone V
  - Egypt (23)
  - Rwanda (48)
  - Uganda (71)
- Zone VI
  - Zambia (NR)
- Zone VII
  - Angola (38)

== Group phase ==
The draw of the group phase took place on 25 August 2024 in Kigali, Rwanda.

In this round, the teams were drawn into three groups of four. The top two teams from each group and the best two third-placed teams advanced to the quarterfinals; the other teams were dropped to the 9th–12th place playoffs.

All times are local (South African Standard Time; UTC+2).

=== Group A ===
Pos	Team	Pld	W	L	PF	PA	PD	Pts	Qualification
1	Mali	3	3	0	199	177	+22	6	Quarterfinals
2	Senegal	3	2	1	191	183	+8	5	Quarterfinals
3	Cameroon	3	1	2	181	196	−15	4	Quarterfinals
4	Ivory Coast	3	0	3	194	209	−15	3	9th–12th place playoffs

Source: FIBA Africa
Rules for classification: 1) Points; 2) Head-to-head results; 3) Points difference; 4) Points scored.

4 September 2024
12:30

Boxscore

Ivory Coast	62–67	Cameroon
Scoring by quarter: 22–17, 7–23, 12–14, 21–13

University of Pretoria

4 September 2024
17:30

Boxscore

Mali	64–50	Senegal
Scoring by quarter: 9–7, 19–11, 17–18, 19–14

University of Pretoria

7 September 2024
17:30

Boxscore

Senegal	69–63	Ivory Coast
Scoring by quarter: 13–19, 20–10, 10–16, 26–18

University of Pretoria

7 September 2024
20:00

Boxscore

Cameroon	58–62	Mali
Scoring by quarter: 11–16, 20–14, 13–12, 14–20

University of Pretoria

10 September 2024
15:00

Boxscore

Cameroon	56–72	Senegal
Scoring by quarter: 17–13, 9–14, 12–17, 18–28

University of Pretoria

10 September 2024
17:30

Boxscore

Mali	73–69	Ivory Coast
Scoring by quarter: 17–14, 17–19, 24–16, 15–20

University of Pretoria

=== Group B ===
Pos	Team	Pld	W	L	PF	PA	PD	Pts	Qualification
1	Egypt	3	2	1	197	164	+33	5	Quarterfinals
2	Angola	3	2	1	211	197	+14	5	Quarterfinals
3	Nigeria	3	2	1	199	196	+3	5	Quarterfinals
4	Uganda	3	0	3	184	234	−50	3	9th–12th place playoffs

Source: FIBA Africa
Rules for classification: 1) Points; 2) Head-to-head results; 3) Points difference; 4) Points scored.

4 September 2024
15:00

Boxscore

Angola	89–73	Uganda
Scoring by quarter: 20–19, 18–18, 22–6, 29–30

University of Pretoria

4 September 2024
20:00

Boxscore

Egypt	70–57	Nigeria
Scoring by quarter: 14–17, 23–15, 15–16, 18–9

University of Pretoria

7 September 2024
12:30

Boxscore

Uganda	50–73	Egypt
Scoring by quarter: 11–15, 15–18, 13–14, 11–26

University of Pretoria

7 September 2024
15:00

Boxscore

Nigeria	70–65	Angola
Scoring by quarter: 20–18, 12–6, 15–25, 23–16

University of Pretoria

10 September 2024
12:30

Boxscore

Uganda	61–72	Nigeria
Scoring by quarter: 15–21, 11–19, 15–17, 20–15

University of Pretoria

10 September 2024
20:00

Boxscore

Egypt	54–57	Angola
Scoring by quarter: 18–14, 12–15, 9–13, 15–15

University of Pretoria

=== Group C ===
Pos	Team	Pld	W	L	PF	PA	PD	Pts	Qualification
1	Rwanda	3	3	0	223	184	+39	6	Quarterfinals
2	Morocco	3	2	1	201	154	+47	5	Quarterfinals
3	Zambia	3	1	2	206	231	−25	4	9th–12th place playoffs
4	South Africa (H)	3	0	3	156	217	−61	3	9th–12th place playoffs

Source: FIBA Africa
Rules for classification: 1) Points; 2) Head-to-head results; 3) Points difference; 4) Points scored.
(H) Hosts

3 September 2024
12:30

Boxscore

South Africa	64–81	Rwanda
Scoring by quarter: 12–24, 17–26, 15–13, 20–18

University of Pretoria

3 September 2024
17:30

Boxscore

Morocco	84–67	Zambia
Scoring by quarter: 23–12, 21–17, 13–23, 27–15
Pts: Solhi 21; Rebs: El Baze 9 Asts: El Baze 5

University of Pretoria
Attendance: 100
Referees: David Joao DOMINGOS MANUEL (ANG), Mohamed ELMENSHAWY (EGY), Emmanuel O.Paterne KPAWOGBO (BEN)

6 September 2024
15:00

Boxscore

Zambia	70–61	South Africa
Scoring by quarter: 23–12, 15–23, 13–13, 19–13

University of Pretoria

6 September 2024
17:30

Boxscore

Rwanda	56–51	Morocco
Scoring by quarter: 8–13, 24–17, 11–9, 13–12
Pts: - Rebs: - Asts: -		Pts: Karem 26; Rebs: Solhi 11; Asts: Solhi 5

University of Pretoria
Attendance: 100

9 September 2024
15:00

Boxscore

South Africa	31–66	Morocco
Scoring by quarter: 10–24, 9–15, 6–8, 6–19
Pts: - Rebs: - Asts: -		Pts: Solhi 13; Rebs: El Baze / Bahmad 9 Asts: El Baze 6

University of Pretoria
Attendance: 50

9 September 2024
20:00

Boxscore

Zambia	69–86	Rwanda
Scoring by quarter: 15–23, 27–18, 13–29, 14–16

University of Pretoria

=== Ranking of third-placed teams ===
Pos	Grp	Team	Pld	W	L	PF	PA	PD	Pts	Qualification
1	B	Nigeria	3	2	1	199	196	+3	5	Quarterfinals
2	A	Cameroon	3	1	2	181	196	−15	4	Quarterfinals
3	C	Zambia	3	1	2	206	231	−25	4	9th–12th place playoffs

Source: FIBA Africa

== Group phase overall ranking ==
Rank	Team
1	Rwanda
2	Mali
3	Egypt
4	Morocco
5	Angola
6	Senegal
7	Nigeria
8	Cameroon
9	Zambia
10	Ivory Coast
11	Uganda
12	South Africa

Advanced to quarterfinals
Dropped to 9th–12th place playoffs

== 9th–12th place playoffs ==
9th–12th place semifinals
11 September
9	Zambia	47
12	South Africa	53
11 September
10	Ivory Coast	77
11	Uganda	66

9th place game
12 September
South Africa	55
Ivory Coast	84
11th place game
12 September
Zambia	61
Uganda	54

=== 9th–12th place semifinals ===
11 September 2024
17:00

Boxscore

Zambia	47–53	South Africa
Scoring by quarter: 7–6, 16–11, 14–17, 10–19

Pilditch Indoor, Pretoria

11 September 2024
19:30

Boxscore

Ivory Coast	77–66	Uganda
Scoring by quarter: 24–19, 7–16, 30–15, 16–16

Pilditch Indoor, Pretoria

==== 11th place game ====
12 September 2024
17:00

Boxscore

Zambia	61–54	Uganda
Scoring by quarter: 16–16, 19–19, 10–12, 16–7

Pilditch Indoor, Pretoria

==== 9th place game ====
12 September 2024
19:30

Boxscore

South Africa	55–84	Ivory Coast
Scoring by quarter: 16–17, 11–21, 19–22, 9–24

Pilditch Indoor, Pretoria

== Championship playoffs ==
5th place game
14 September
Angola	69
Egypt	72
7th place game
14 September
Rwanda	61
Nigeria	78

5th–8th place semifinals
13 September
Rwanda	56
Angola	68
13 September
Nigeria	63
Egypt	82

Quarterfinals
12 September
1	Rwanda	53
8	Cameroon	67
12 September
4	Morocco	61
5	Angola	45
12 September
2	Mali	81
7	Nigeria	70
12 September
3	Egypt	61
6	Senegal	68

Semifinals
13 September
Cameroon	67
Morocco	47
13 September
Mali	68
Senegal	60

Final
14 September
Cameroon	51
Mali	60
3rd place game
14 September
Morocco	71
Senegal	72

=== Quarterfinals ===
12 September 2024
12:30

Boxscore

Morocco	61–45	Angola
Scoring by quarter: 22–14, 15–11, 12–13, 12–7
Pts: Solhi 22; Rebs: Bahmad 11; Asts: karem 5		Pts: Neto 12; Rebs: Neto 9 Asts: Neto 4

University of Pretoria

12 September 2024
15:00

Boxscore

Rwanda	53–67	Cameroon
Scoring by quarter: 16–14, 16–22, 17–15, 4–16

University of Pretoria

12 September 2024
17:30

Boxscore

Egypt	61–68	Senegal
Scoring by quarter: 16–19, 12–13, 15–15, 18–21

University of Pretoria

12 September 2024
20:00

Boxscore

Mali	81–70	Nigeria
Scoring by quarter: 19–23, 21–15, 14–15, 27–17

University of Pretoria

=== 5th–8th place semifinals ===
13 September 2024
17:00

Boxscore

Rwanda	56–68	Angola
Scoring by quarter: 11–16, 10–16, 11–17, 24–19

Pilditch Indoor, Pretoria

13 September 2024
19:30

Boxscore

Nigeria	63–82	Egypt
Scoring by quarter: 16–25, 16–30, 22–15, 9–12

Pilditch Indoor, Pretoria

==== 7th place game ====
14 September 2024
14:00

Boxscore

Rwanda	61–78	Nigeria
Scoring by quarter: 14–20, 13–17, 14–19, 20–22

Pilditch Indoor, Pretoria

==== 5th place game ====
14 September 2024
16:30

Boxscore

Angola	69–72	Egypt
Scoring by quarter: 14–27, 24–32, 18–6, 13–7

Pilditch Indoor, Pretoria

=== Semifinals ===
13 September 2024
17:30

Boxscore

Cameroon	67–47	Morocco
Scoring by quarter: 13–19, 19–10, 16–13, 19–5

University of Pretoria

13 September 2024
20:00

Boxscore

Mali	68–60	Senegal
Scoring by quarter: 15–16, 16–28, 24–7, 13–9

University of Pretoria

==== 3rd place game ====
14 September 2024
14:30

Boxscore

Morocco	71–72	Senegal
Scoring by quarter: 19–20, 14–17, 16–17, 22–18

University of Pretoria

==== Final ====
14 September 2024
20:30

Boxscore

Cameroon	51–60	Mali
Scoring by quarter: 10–10, 11–17, 15–15, 15–18

University of Pretoria

== Final standings ==
Rank	Team	Record
1st place, gold medalist(s)	Mali	6–0
2nd place, silver medalist(s)	Cameroon	3–3
3rd place, bronze medalist(s)	Senegal	4–2
4	Morocco	3–3
5	Egypt	4–2
6	Angola	3–3
7	Nigeria	3–3
8	Rwanda	3–3
9	Ivory Coast	2–3
10	South Africa	1–4
11	Zambia	2–3
12	Uganda	0–5

Qualified for the 2025 FIBA Under-19 Basketball World Cup
