= 1998 FIBA Africa Under-18 Championship =

11th iteration of an Africa-based basketball competition, hosted in Egypt

1998 FIBA U18 AfroBasket
9th FIBA Under-18 African Basketball Championship

Tournament details
- Host country: Egypt
- Dates: August 27 - September 3, 1998
- Teams: 6 (from 53 federations)
- Venue: 1 (in 1 host city)

Final positions
- Champions: Nigeria (4th title)

Tournament statistics
- MVP: (Ivory Coast) Michel Lasme

Official website
- 1998 FIBA Africa Under-18 Championship

The 1998 FIBA Africa Under-18 Championship was the 9th FIBA Africa Under-18 Championship, played under the rules of FIBA, the world governing body for basketball, and the FIBA Africa thereof. The tournament was hosted by Egypt from August 27 to September 3, 1998.

Nigeria ended the round-robin tournament with a 5–0 unbeaten record to win their fourth title.

Both winner and runner-up qualified for the 1999 FIBA Under-19 World Championship.

== Participating teams ==
Angola
Egypt
Morocco
Nigeria
South Africa
Tunisia

== Schedule ==
P	Team	M	W	L	PF	PA	Diff	Pts.
1	Nigeria	5	5	0	396	259	+137	10
2	Egypt	5	4	1	418	315	+103	9
3	Angola	5	3	2	328	305	+23	8
4	South Africa	5	2	3	310	375	-65	7
4	Tunisia	5	1	4	271	350	-79	6
4	Morocco	5	0	5	237	356	-119	5

Egypt	72–40	Morocco

Alexandria

Nigeria	79–44	South Africa

Angola	66–54	Tunisia

Tunisia	54–85	Egypt

Alexandria

Morocco	42–86	Nigeria

Angola	68–65	South Africa

Nigeria	83–42	Tunisia

Alexandria

Egypt	79–72	Angola

Morocco	65–67	South Africa

Tunisia	63–46	Morocco

Alexandria

Nigeria	63–54	Angola

Egypt	105–64	South Africa

Morocco	44–68	Angola

Alexandria

South Africa	70–58	Tunisia

Egypt	77–85	Nigeria

== Final standings ==
Qualified for the 1999 FIBA U19 World Championship

Rank	Team	Record
Gold medal	Nigeria	5–0
Silver medal	Egypt	4–1
Bronze medal	Angola	3–2
4	South Africa	2–3
5	Tunisia	1–4
6	Morocco	0–5

== Awards ==
1998 FIBA Africa Under-18 Championship winner

Nigeria
Fourth title

Most Valuable Player
(Ivory Coast) Michel Lasme

== See also ==
- 1999 FIBA Africa Championship
