= 2008 FIBA Africa Under-18 Championship =

2008 FIBA U18 AfroBasket
13th FIBA Under-18 African Basketball Championship

Tournament details
- Host country: Egypt
- Dates: October 17–26
- Teams: 12
- Venue: 1 (in 1 host city)

Final positions
- Champions: Egypt (3rd title)

Tournament statistics
- MVP: (Egypt) Amr Gendy
- Top scorer: (Egypt) Gendy 21.8
- Top rebounds: (Central African Republic) Djimrabaye 12.9
- Top assists: (Egypt) Gendy 3.6
- PPG (Team): Egypt 80.3
- RPG (Team): Nigeria 40.9
- APG (Team): Egypt 16

Official website
- 2008 FIBA Africa U18 Championship

The 2008 FIBA Africa Under-18 Championship for Men (alternatively the Afrobasket U18) was the 13th edition, organized by FIBA Africa and played under the auspices of the Fédération Internationale de Basketball, the basketball sport governing body and the African zone thereof. The tournament was held from October 17–26 in Alexandria, Egypt and won by Egypt.

The tournament qualified both the winner and the runner-up for the 2009 Under-19 World Cup.

== Format ==
- The 12 teams were divided into two groups (Groups A+B) for the preliminary round.
- Round robin for the preliminary round; the top four teams from each group advanced to the quarterfinals.
- From there on a knockout system was used until the final.

== Draw ==
| Group A | Group B |
|---|---|
| Central African Republic; Egypt; Mali; Morocco; Mozambique; Senegal | Algeria; Angola; Congo; Ivory Coast; Kenya; Nigeria |

== Preliminary round ==
=== Group A ===
| Qualified for the quarter-finals |

| Team | Pld | W | L | PF | PA | PD | Pts |
|---|---|---|---|---|---|---|---|
| Egypt | 5 | 5 | 0 | 412 | 309 | +103 | 10 |
| Mali | 5 | 4 | 1 | 349 | 280 | +69 | 9 |
| Senegal | 5 | 3 | 2 | 305 | 310 | -5 | 8 |
| Morocco | 5 | 2 | 3 | 282 | 305 | -23 | 7 |
| Central African Rep. | 5 | 1 | 4 | 319 | 325 | -6 | 6 |
| Mozambique | 5 | 0 | 5 | 292 | 430 | -138 | 5 |

17 October 2008
10:00

Boxscore

| Mali | 91–37 | Mozambique |
Scoring by quarter: 24-13, 24-8, 17-12, 26-4
| Pts: Soumaoro 18; Rebs: Soumaoro 13; Asts: A.Maïga 5 | | Pts: Honwana 15; Rebs: O.Novela 5 Asts: five players 1 |

Alexandria

17 October 2008
12:00

Boxscore

| Senegal | 66–65 | Central African Rep. |
Scoring by quarter: 15-17, 16-8, 16-21, 19-19
| Pts: Ndao 16; Rebs: Mbaye 8 Asts: Niang 4 | | Pts: Ngassio 20; Rebs: Djimrabaye 12; Asts: Malikode 4 |

Alexandria

17 October 2008
18:00

Boxscore

| Egypt | 72–52 | Morocco |
Scoring by quarter: 24-5, 21-10, 12-19, 15-18
| Pts: Desouky 12; Rebs: Mohamed 6 Asts: Mohamed 5 | | Pts: Boulaakoul, Srhir 11; Rebs: Boulaakoul, Joulal 6 Asts: five players 1 |

Alexandria

18 October 2008
16:00

Boxscore

| Mali | 56–42 | Senegal |
Scoring by quarter: 11-8, 16-12, 13-9, 16-13
| Pts: Haidara 17; Rebs: Niambele 8 Asts: A.Maïga 3 | | Pts: three players 8 Rebs: Mbaye 7 Asts: Niang 2 |

Alexandria

18 October 2008
18:00

Boxscore

| Morocco | vs. | Central African Rep. |
Scoring by quarter: 16-11, 21-5, 12-15, 9-11
| Pts: Boulaakoul 20; Rebs: Zehouani 8 Asts: Zariat 4 | | Pts: Baker 13; Rebs: Djimrabaye 10; Asts: five players 1 |

Alexandria

18 October 2008
20:00

Boxscore

| Mozambique | 67–105 | Egypt |
Scoring by quarter: 20-21, 10-32, 14-31, 23-21
| Pts: E.Novela 17; Rebs: Mariote 7 Asts: O.Novela 2 | | Pts: Gendy 20; Rebs: Oraby 9 Asts: Okasha 6 |

Alexandria

19 October 2008
16:00

Boxscore

| Morocco | 51–62 | Mali |
Scoring by quarter: 18-17, 14-14, 4-18, 15-13
| Pts: Boulaakoul 20; Rebs: Joulal 7 Asts: Zehouani 2 | | Pts: Haidara 21; Rebs: Niambele 10; Asts: Niane 3 |

Alexandria

19 October 2008
18:00

Boxscore

| Mozambique | 58–76 | Senegal |
Scoring by quarter: 12-17, 19-19, 17-16, 10-24
| Pts: E.Novela 16; Rebs: E.Novela 8 Asts: five players 1 | | Pts: Adams 20; Rebs: Mbaye 15; Asts: Niang 6 |

Alexandria

19 October 2008
20:00

Boxscore

| Egypt | 67–62 | Central African Rep. |
Scoring by quarter: 22-18, 19-16, 9-13, 17-15
| Pts: Gendy 18; Rebs: Oraby 6 Asts: Gendy, Okasha 5 | | Pts: Baker 24; Rebs: Djimrabaye 12; Asts: Djimrabaye, Malikode 3 |

Alexandria

21 October 2008
16:00

Boxscore

| Central African Rep. | 66–77 | Mali |
Scoring by quarter: 16-28, 15-23, 26-19, 9-7
| Pts: Ngassio 21; Rebs: Djimrabaye, Baker 12; Asts: four players 2 | | Pts: Niane 21; Rebs: four players 5 Asts: Niane 6 |

Alexandria

21 October 2008
18:00

Boxscore

| Mozambique | 73–74 | Morocco |
Scoring by quarter: 15-15, 26-20, 6-21, 20-11
| Pts: E.Novela 18; Rebs: Uamusse 7 Asts: E.Novela 1 | | Pts: Boulaakoul 23; Rebs: Joulal 21; Asts: Zehouani 4 |

Alexandria

21 October 2008
20:00

Boxscore

| Senegal | 65–84 | Egypt |
Scoring by quarter: 21-24, 8-22, 16-19, 20-19
| Pts: Niang 20; Rebs: Adams 6 Asts: Ndao 3 | | Pts: Gendy 19; Rebs: Gendy 9 Asts: Gendy, Okasha 4 |

Alexandria

22 October 2008
16:00

Boxscore

| Central African Rep. | 84–57 | Mozambique |
Scoring by quarter: 12-13, 20-17, 22-18, 30-9
| Pts: Djimrabaye 19; Rebs: Djimrabaye 22; Asts: Baker, Naguidengar 2 | | Pts: O.Novela 17; Rebs: O.Novela 6 Asts: three players 2 |

Alexandria

22 October 2008
18:00

Boxscore

| Senegal | 56–47 | Morocco |
Scoring by quarter: 15-8, 22-7, 6-10, 13-22
| Pts: Adams 17; Rebs: Mbaye 12; Asts: Hann 3 | | Pts: Boulaakoul 13; Rebs: Srhir 8 Asts: Boulaakoul 4 |

Alexandria

22 October 2008
20:00

Boxscore

| Egypt | 84–63 | Mali |
Scoring by quarter: 24-12, 20-18, 24-12, 16-21
| Pts: Gendy 39; Rebs: Gendy 13; Asts: Mobarak 8 | | Pts: Niane 21; Rebs: Niambele, Haidara 9 Asts: Niane 6 |

Alexandria

=== Group B ===
| Qualified for the quarter-finals |

| Team | Pld | W | L | PF | PA | PD | Pts |
|---|---|---|---|---|---|---|---|
| Nigeria | 5 | 5 | 0 | 344 | 263 | +81 | 10 |
| Ivory Coast | 5 | 3 | 2 | 323 | 275 | +48 | 8 |
| Angola | 5 | 3 | 2 | 308 | 268 | +40 | 8 |
| Algeria | 5 | 3 | 2 | 306 | 304 | +2 | 8 |
| Congo | 5 | 1 | 4 | 282 | 342 | -60 | 6 |
| Kenya | 5 | 0 | 5 | 238 | 349 | -111 | 5 |

17 October 2008
10:00

Boxscore

| Congo | 67–73 | Algeria |
Scoring by quarter: 15-23, 23-15, 13-18, 16-17
| Pts: Bopaka 16; Rebs: Mpandzou 8 Asts: Nguia 3 | | Pts: Fedala, Zerouali 15; Rebs: Moulinou 10; Asts: Fedala, Cherif 5 |

Alexandria

17 October 2008
12:00

Boxscore

| Nigeria | 66–53 | Ivory Coast |
Scoring by quarter: 22-13, 12-7, 22-13, 10-20
| Pts: Sule 17; Rebs: Achiuwa 9 Asts: Sule 3 | | Pts: Coulibaly 16; Rebs: Coulibaly 10; Asts: Kouzia 4 |

Alexandria

20 October 2008
16:00

Boxscore

| Angola | 62–43 | Kenya |
Scoring by quarter: 14-7, 14-11, 8-13, 26-12
| Pts: E.Ferreira 14; Rebs: Josemar 7 Asts: Emanuel 6 | | Pts: Opingo 14; Rebs: Nyamai 8 Asts: Nyamai 2 |

Alexandria

18 October 2008
16:00

Boxscore

| Ivory Coast | 49–58 | Algeria |
Scoring by quarter: 6-15, 10-10, 14-18, 19-15
| Pts: Allui 17; Rebs: Coulibaly, N'Guessan 9 Asts: Touré 2 | | Pts: Harat, Fedala 13; Rebs: Harat 12; Asts: Fedala 4 |

Alexandria

18 October 2008
18:00

Boxscore

| Angola | 67–42 | Congo |
Scoring by quarter: 18-8, 14-13, 25-10, 10-11
| Pts: Ndoniema 20; Rebs: Josemar 9 Asts: Emanuel 6 | | Pts: Nguia, Matembili 10; Rebs: Mpandzou 8 Asts: three players 1 |

Alexandria

18 October 2008
20:00

Boxscore

| Kenya | 49–81 | Nigeria |
Scoring by quarter: 11-21, 11-21, 11-21, 16-18
| Pts: Wasula 12; Rebs: Nyamai 9 Asts: Nyamai 4 | | Pts: Sule 23; Rebs: Oyeniyi 10; Asts: Igben 3 |

Alexandria

19 October 2008
16:00

Boxscore

| Nigeria | 69–63 | Algeria |
Scoring by quarter: 20-16, 14-7, 15-20, 20-20
| Pts: Sule 20; Rebs: Achiuwa 15; Asts: Edwin 5 | | Pts: Fedala 17; Rebs: Harat 6 Asts: Fedala 5 |

Alexandria

19 October 2008
18:00

Boxscore

| Ivory Coast | 79–65 | Angola |
Scoring by quarter: 11-14, 21-13, 19-15, 28-23
| Pts: Camara 28; Rebs: Coulibaly 9 Asts: Kouzia 4 | | Pts: Emanuel 14; Rebs: three players 6 Asts: Emanuel 5 |

Alexandria

19 October 2008
20:00

Boxscore

| Kenya | 58–72 | Congo |
Scoring by quarter: 16-13, 8-21, 16-20, 18-18
| Pts: Khaemba 16; Rebs: Opingo 12; Asts: Wasula 5 | | Pts: Nguia 16; Rebs: Kandza 8 Asts: Nguia 3 |

Alexandria

21 October 2008
16:00

Boxscore

| Congo | 54–77 | Nigeria |
Scoring by quarter: 17-20, 12-19, 11-12, 14-26
| Pts: Mpandzou 15; Rebs: four players 4 Asts: four players 1 | | Pts: Sule 17; Rebs: Oyeniyi 11; Asts: Sule 5 |

Alexandria

21 October 2008
18:00

Boxscore

| Algeria | 53–70 | Angola |
Scoring by quarter: 13-14, 15-19, 8-18, 17-19
| Pts: Harat, Fedala 16; Rebs: Harat 13; Asts: Fedala 4 | | Pts: Emanuel 18; Rebs: Emanuel, Ndoniema 8 Asts: Ndoniema, E.Ferreira 3 |

Alexandria

21 October 2008
20:00

Boxscore

| Kenya | 39–75 | Ivory Coast |
Scoring by quarter: 13-19, 7-19, 9-20, 10-17
| Pts: Opingo 11; Rebs: Nyamai 14; Asts: Opingo, Khaemba 2 | | Pts: Camara 22; Rebs: N'Guessan 10; Asts: Allui 3 |

Alexandria

22 October 2008
16:00

Boxscore

| Congo | 47–67 | Ivory Coast |
Scoring by quarter: 12-20, 17-18, 6-14, 12-15
| Pts: Ganogo 10; Rebs: Mpandzou 13; Asts: three players 2 | | Pts: Traoré 16; Rebs: Camara 11; Asts: Camara 3 |

Alexandria

22 October 2008
18:00

Boxscore

| Nigeria | 51–44 | Angola |
Scoring by quarter: 11-8, 12-15, 12-14, 16-7
| Pts: Sule 19; Rebs: Achiuwa 9 Asts: Sule, Edwin 2 | | Pts: Gildo 14; Rebs: Kiala 17; Asts: Ndoniema 3 |

Alexandria

22 October 2008
20:00

Boxscore

| Algeria | 59–49 | Kenya |
Scoring by quarter: 14-13, 21-10, 12-13, 12-13
| Pts: Zerouali 20; Rebs: Moulinou 12; Asts: Zerouali 3 | | Pts: Nyamai 15; Rebs: Nyamai 17; Asts: Khaemba, Opingo 2 |

Alexandria

== Knockout stage ==
Championship bracket

Quarter-finals
Fri 24 Oct 2008 - 20:00
Algeria | 65
Egypt | 70
Fri 24 Oct 2008 - 16:00
Senegal | 58
Ivory Coast | 45
Fri 24 Oct 2008 - 14:00
Morocco | 41
Nigeria | 64
Fri 24 Oct 2008 - 18:00
Angola | 69
Mali | 51

Semi-finals
Sat 25 Oct 2008 – 18:00
Egypt | 75
Senegal | 62
Sat 25 Oct 2008 – 20:00
Nigeria | 65
Angola | 71

Final
Sun 26 Oct 2008 – 20:00
Egypt | 85
Angola | 84
Third place
Sun 26 Oct 2008 – 18:00
Senegal | 57
Nigeria | 68

5-8th bracket

5th-8th place
Sat 25 Oct 2008 – 18:00
Algeria | 40
Ivory Coast | 41
Sat 25 Oct 2008 – 20:00
Morocco | 48
Mali | 53

Fifth place
Sun 26 Oct 2008 – 16:00
Ivory Coast | 36
Mali | 54
Seventh place
Sun 26 Oct 2008 – 14:00
Algeria | 65
Morocco | 34

9-12th bracket

9-12th place
Fri 24 Oct 2008 - 14:00
Central African R. | 79
Congo | 58
Fri 24 Oct 2008 - 16:00
Kenya | 67
Mozambique | 69

9th place
Sat 25 Oct 2008 – 16:00
Central African R. | 80
Mozambique | 59'
11th place
Sat 25 Oct 2008 – 14:00
Congo | 83
Kenya | 68

=== 9–12th classification ===
24 October 2008
14:00

Boxscore

| Central African Rep. | 79–58 | Congo |
Scoring by quarter: 23-5, 14-13, 19-20, 23-20
| Pts: Baker 25; Rebs: Djimrabaye 10; Asts: Malikode, Sokambi 3 | | Pts: Ganga 14; Rebs: Matembili 9 Asts: four players 1 |

Alexandria

24 October 2008
16:00

Boxscore

| Kenya | 67–69 | Mozambique |
Scoring by quarter: 21-15, 10-16, 12-16, 14-10
| Pts: Orwe 18; Rebs: Nyamai 16; Asts: Nyamai 5 | | Pts: O.Novela 15; Rebs: Honwana, Mariote 6 Asts: O.Novela 4 |

Alexandria

=== Quarterfinals ===
24 October 2008
14:00

Boxscore

| Morocco | 41–64 | Nigeria |
Scoring by quarter: 8-17, 10-19, 10-17, 13-11
| Pts: Fatah 10; Rebs: Fatah 4 Asts: Zariat, Boulaakoul 2 | | Pts: Sule 15; Rebs: Achiuwa 12; Asts: Sule, Edwin 4 |

Alexandria

24 October 2008
16:00

Boxscore

| Senegal | 58–45 | Ivory Coast |
Scoring by quarter: 8-10, 17-12, 17-16, 16-7
| Pts: Niang 15; Rebs: Mbaye 14; Asts: Adams 3 | | Pts: Camara 15; Rebs: Dialo 10; Asts: Touré 4 |

Alexandria

24 October 2008
18:00

Boxscore

| Angola | 69–51 | Mali |
Scoring by quarter: 24-15, 19-7, 15-14, 11-15
| Pts: Josemar 15; Rebs: Kiala 16; Asts: Emanuel 3 | | Pts: Niambele 12; Rebs: Niambele 11; Asts: A.Maïga 3 |

Alexandria

24 October 2008
20:00

Boxscore

| Algeria | 65–70 | Egypt |
Scoring by quarter: 10-23, 13-18, 19-15, 23-14
| Pts: Zerouali 18; Rebs: Harat 10; Asts: Fedala 4 | | Pts: Gendy 30; Rebs: Gendy 12; Asts: Mobarak, Elbeltagy 4 |

Alexandria

=== 11th place ===
25 October 2008
14:00

Boxscore

| Congo | 83–68 | Kenya |
Scoring by quarter: 22-10, 19-22, 16-22, 26-24
| Pts: Bopaka 17; Rebs: Badzioka 12; Asts: Nguia 4 | | Pts: Orwe, Opingo 22; Rebs: Khaemba, Wafula 7 Asts: Khaemba 4 |

Alexandria

=== 9th place ===
25 October 2008
16:00

Boxscore

| Central African Rep. | 80–59 | Mozambique |
Scoring by quarter: 24-17, 20-15, 17-12, 19-15
| Pts: Baker 16; Rebs: Djimrabaye 12; Asts: Arafat 3 | | Pts: Honwana 12; Rebs: Mariote 6 Asts: E.Novela 5 |

Alexandria

=== Classification 5–8 ===
25 October 2008
18:00

Boxscore

| Algeria | 40–41 | Ivory Coast |
Scoring by quarter: 9-8, 8-7, 11-21, 12-5
| Pts: Zerouali 11; Rebs: Moulinou 10; Asts: Fedala 3 | | Pts: Camara 16; Rebs: Kesse 9 Asts: Kouzia 3 |

Alexandria

25 October 2008
20:00

Boxscore

| Morocco | 48–53 | Mali |
Scoring by quarter: 8-15, 9-8, 12-12, 19-18
| Pts: Zariat 12; Rebs: Fatah, Joulal 8 Asts: five players 1 | | Pts: Niane 16; Rebs: Niambele 10; Asts: Niane, Haidara 2 |

Alexandria

=== Semifinals ===
25 October 2008
18:00

Boxscore

| Egypt | 75–62 | Senegal |
Scoring by quarter: 18-22, 19-20, 12-8, 26-12
| Pts: Desouky 21; Rebs: Desouky 10; Asts: Elbeltagy 9 | | Pts: Niang 18; Rebs: Mbaye 9 Asts: Ndao 3 |

Alexandria

25 October 2008
20:00

Boxscore

| Nigeria | 65–71 | Angola |
Scoring by quarter: 11-26, 7-16, 28-19, 19-10
| Pts: Sule 20; Rebs: Achiuwa 9 Asts: Sule 3 | | Pts: Emanuel 30; Rebs: Josemar 8 Asts: Emanuel 4 |

Alexandria

=== 7th place ===
26 October 2008
14:00

Boxscore

| Algeria | 65–34 | Morocco |
Scoring by quarter: 17-17, 23-7, 12-8, 13-2
| Pts: Harat 25; Rebs: Harat 12; Asts: six players 1 | | Pts: Boulaakoul 10; Rebs: Joulal 10; Asts: Zariat 1 |

Alexandria

=== 5th place ===
26 October 2008
16:00

Boxscore

| Ivory Coast | 36–54 | Mali |
Scoring by quarter: 11-13, 8-15, 6-17, 11-9
| Pts: Camara 14; Rebs: N'Guessan 5 Asts: Kesse 2 | | Pts: Samake 12; Rebs: Samake 9 Asts: A.Maïga 5 |

Alexandria

=== Bronze medal game ===
26 October 2008
18:00

[ Boxscore]

| Senegal | 57–68 | Nigeria |
Scoring by quarter: 19-23, 16-10, 10-13, 12-22
| Pts: Adams 14; Rebs: Gomis 10; Asts: Adams 4 | | Pts: Edwin 16; Rebs: Achiuwa 8 Asts: Olanrewaju, Ikonshul 2 |

Alexandria

=== Gold medal game ===
26 October 2008
20:00

Boxscore

| Egypt | 85–84 | Angola |
Scoring by quarter: 14-20, 24-18, 23-22, 24-24
| Pts: Gendy 30; Rebs: Gendy 9 Asts: Mobarak 6 | | Pts: Emanuel 31; Rebs: Kiala, E.Ferreira 8 Asts: Ndoniema, Josemar 1 |

Alexandria

== Final standings ==
| Qualified for the 2009 World U19 Championship |

| Rank | Team | Record |
|---|---|---|
| Gold medal | Egypt | 8–0 |
| Silver medal | Angola | 5–3 |
| Bronze medal | Nigeria | 7–1 |
| 4. | Senegal | 4–4 |
| 5. | Mali | 6–2 |
| 6. | Ivory Coast | 4–4 |
| 7. | Algeria | 4–4 |
| 8. | Morocco | 2–6 |
| 9. | Central African Rep. | 3–4 |
| 10. | Mozambique | 1–6 |
| 11. | Congo | 2–5 |
| 12. | Kenya | 0–7 |

Egypt roster
Adham Elsayed, Aly Mohamed, Amr Abdelkader, Amr Gendy, Hady Elbeltagy, Moamen Mobarak, Mohamed Desouky, Motaz Okasha, Moustafa Hany, Omar Oraby, Ramy Hosny, Zyad Mohamed Coach:

== All Tournament Team ==
| G | (Egypt) | Amr Gendy |
| F | (Egypt) | Moamen Mobarak |
| F | (Ivory Coast) | Daouda Camara |
| C | (Angola) | Miguel Kiala |
| C | (Central African Republic) | Jimmy Djimrabaye |

2008 FIBA Africa Under-18 Championship winner

Egypt
Third title

Most Valuable Player
(Egypt) Amr Gendy

== Statistical Leaders ==
=== Individual Tournament Highs ===
Points

| Rank | Name | G | Pts | PPG |
|---|---|---|---|---|
| 1 | (Egypt) Amr Gendy | 8 | 174 | 21.8 |
| 2 | (Nigeria) Haruna Sule | 8 | 145 | 18.1 |
| 3 | (Angola) Emanuel António | 8 | 130 | 16.3 |
| 4 | (Central African Republic) Clovis Baker | 7 | 106 | 15.1 |
| 5 | (Ivory Coast) Daouda Camara | 8 | 114 | 14.3 |
| 6 | (Mali) Hamet Niane | 8 | 111 | 13.9 |
| 7 | (Morocco) Jihad Boulaakoul | 8 | 110 | 13.8 |
| 8 | (Kenya) Anthony Opingo | 7 | 95 | 13.6 |
| 9 | (Algeria) Mohamed Harat | 8 | 106 | 13.3 |
| 10 | (Central African Republic) Jimmy Djimrabaye | 7 | 92 | 13.1 |

Rebounds

| Rank | Name | G | Rbs | RPG |
|---|---|---|---|---|
| 1 | (Central African Republic) Jimmy Djimrabaye | 7 | 90 | 12.9 |
| 2 | (Kenya) Erick Nyamai | 6 | 75 | 12.5 |
| 3 | (Nigeria) Godsgift Achiuwa | 8 | 76 | 9.5 |
| 4 | (Senegal) Papa Mbaye | 8 | 74 | 9.2 |
| 5 | (Algeria) Mohamed Harat | 8 | 73 | 9.1 |
| 6 | (Angola) Miguel Kiala | 8 | 70 | 8.8 |
| 7 | (Morocco) El Mehdi Joulal | 8 | 66 | 8.2 |
| 8 | (Kenya) Joshua Orwe | 7 | 55 | 7.9 |
| 9 | (Egypt) Amr Gendy | 8 | 62 | 7.8 |
| 9 | (Angola) Josemar de Carvalho | 8 | 62 | 7.8 |

Assists

| Rank | Name | G | Ast | APG |
|---|---|---|---|---|
| 1 | (Egypt) Amr Gendy | 8 | 29 | 3.6 |
| 2 | (Algeria) Anis Fedala | 8 | 28 | 3.5 |
| 3 | (Egypt) Moamen Mobarak | 8 | 28 | 3.5 |
| 3 | (Egypt) Motaz Okasha | 8 | 26 | 3.3 |
| 5 | (Angola) Emanuel António | 8 | 25 | 3.1 |
| 5 | (Egypt) Hady Elbeltagy | 8 | 23 | 2.9 |
| 7 | (Mali) Abdrahamane Maïga | 8 | 22 | 2.8 |
| 8 | (Nigeria) Haruna Sule | 8 | 21 | 2.6 |
| 9 | (Mali) Hamet Niane | 8 | 20 | 2.5 |
| 10 | (Senegal) Thierno Niang | 8 | 18 | 2.3 |

Steals

| Rank | Name | G | Sts | SPG |
|---|---|---|---|---|
| 1 | (Mozambique) Orlando Novela | 7 | 34 | 4.9 |
| 2 | (Ivory Coast) Daouda Camara | 8 | 28 | 3.5 |
| 3 | (Senegal) Thierno Niang | 8 | 27 | 3.4 |
| 4 | (Central African Republic) Wilfried Malikode | 7 | 24 | 3.4 |
| 5 | (Angola) Emanuel António | 8 | 26 | 3.3 |
| 6 | (Mozambique) Ermelindo Novela | 7 | 23 | 3.3 |
| 7 | (Kenya) Erick Nyamai | 6 | 19 | 3.2 |
| 8 | (Mali) Hamet Niane | 8 | 22 | 2.8 |
| 9 | (Egypt) Amr Gendy | 8 | 21 | 2.6 |
| 9 | (Egypt) Motaz Okasha | 8 | 21 | 2.6 |

Blocks

| Rank | Name | G | Bks | BPG |
|---|---|---|---|---|
| 1 | (Angola) Miguel Kiala | 8 | 18 | 2.2 |
| 2 | (Senegal) Papa Mbaye | 8 | 14 | 1.8 |
| 3 | (Egypt) Omar Oraby | 8 | 13 | 1.6 |
| 4 | (Mali) Cheick Soumaoro | 8 | 11 | 1.4 |
| 5 | (Mali) Ibrahima Djimbe | 8 | 10 | 1.2 |
| 5 | (Nigeria) Opeyemi Oyeniyi | 8 | 10 | 1.2 |
| 7 | (Nigeria) Godsgift Achiuwa | 8 | 8 | 1 |
| 7 | (Egypt) Mohamed Desouky | 8 | 8 | 1 |
| 9 | (Republic of the Congo) Darraul Badzioka | 7 | 7 | 1 |
| 9 | (Central African Republic) Jimmy Djimrabaye | 7 | 7 | 1 |

Turnovers

| Rank | Name | G | Tos | TPG |
|---|---|---|---|---|
| 1 | (Kenya) Anthony Opingo | 7 | 44 | 6.3 |
| 2 | (Kenya) Joshua Orwe | 7 | 39 | 5.6 |
| 3 | (Algeria) Anis Fedala | 8 | 42 | 5.3 |
| 4 | (Kenya) Romanov Wasula | 7 | 37 | 5.3 |
| 5 | (Kenya) Situma Khaemba | 7 | 35 | 5 |
| 6 | (Mozambique) Orlando Novela | 7 | 34 | 4.9 |
| 7 | (Kenya) Erick Nyamai | 6 | 27 | 4.5 |
| 8 | (Morocco) Jihad Boulaakoul | 8 | 35 | 4.4 |
| 8 | (Angola) Eduardo Ferreira | 8 | 35 | 4.4 |
| 10 | (Morocco) Hamza Zehouani | 8 | 34 | 4.3 |

2-point field goal percentage

| Pos | Name | A | M | % |
|---|---|---|---|---|
| 1 | (Senegal) Thierno Niang | 56 | 35 | 62.5 |
| 2 | (Egypt) Amr Gendy | 84 | 52 | 61.9 |
| 3 | (Algeria) Mohamed Harat | 75 | 44 | 58.7 |
| 4 | (Central African Republic) Clovis Baker | 78 | 44 | 56.4 |
| 5 | (Senegal) Louis Adams | 57 | 32 | 56.1 |
| 6 | (Nigeria) God'sPower Igben | 59 | 30 | 50.8 |
| 7 | (Angola) Emanuel António | 65 | 33 | 50.8 |
| 8 | (Kenya) Erick Nyamai | 52 | 26 | 50 |
| 9 | (Algeria) Abdeldjabar Moulinou | 50 | 24 | 48 |
| 10 | (Angola) Josemar de Carvalho | 65 | 31 | 47.7 |

3-point field goal percentage

| Pos | Name | A | M | % |
|---|---|---|---|---|
| 1 | (Angola) Hermenegildo Santos | 19 | 8 | 42.1 |
| 1 | (Algeria) Mohamed Zerouali | 19 | 8 | 42.1 |
| 3 | (Nigeria) Seun Olanrewaju | 18 | 7 | 38.9 |
| 4 | (Nigeria) Haruna Sule | 69 | 25 | 36.2 |
| 5 | (Nigeria) Jerry Edwin | 17 | 6 | 35.3 |
| 6 | (Mozambique) Ermelindo Novela | 17 | 6 | 35.3 |
| 6 | (Mozambique) Manuel Uamusse | 32 | 11 | 34.4 |
| 8 | (Egypt) Motaz Okasha | 36 | 12 | 33.3 |
| 9 | (Morocco) Jihad Boulaakoul | 64 | 21 | 32.8 |
| 10 | (Central African Republic) Tom Ngassio | 43 | 14 | 32.6 |

Free throw percentage

| Pos | Name | A | M | % |
|---|---|---|---|---|
| 1 | (Nigeria) Jerry Edwin | 25 | 20 | 80 |
| 2 | (Algeria) Mohamed Zerouali | 28 | 21 | 75 |
| 3 | (Mali) Hamet Niane | 26 | 19 | 73.1 |
| 4 | (Egypt) Ramy Hosny | 22 | 16 | 72.7 |
| 5 | (Central African Republic) Jimmy Djimrabaye | 48 | 34 | 70.8 |
| 6 | (Mali) Ibrahima Djimbe | 27 | 19 | 70.4 |
| 6 | (Nigeria) Opeyemi Oyeniyi | 27 | 19 | 70.4 |
| 8 | (Ivory Coast) Ghetty Allui | 39 | 27 | 69.2 |
| 9 | (Egypt) Amr Gendy | 54 | 37 | 68.5 |
| 10 | (Mozambique) Orlando Novela | 44 | 30 | 68.2 |

=== Individual Game Highs ===
| Department | Name | Total | Opponent |
|---|---|---|---|
| Points | (Egypt) Amr Gendy | 39 | Mali |
| Rebounds | (Central African Republic) Jimmy Djimrabaye | 22 | Mozambique |
| Assists | (Egypt) Hady Elbeltagy | 9 | Senegal |
| Steals | (Ivory Coast) Hanna Amani | 11 | Botswana |
| Blocks | (Senegal) Papa Mbaye | 6 | Mozambique |
| 2-point field goal percentage | (Mali) Negueba Samake | 100% (6/6) | Ivory Coast |
| 3-point field goal percentage | (Central African Republic) Kenny Naguidengar | 100% (3/3) | Mozambique |
| Free throw percentage | (Mozambique) Orlando Novela (Nigeria) Opeyemi Oyeniyi | 100% (8/8) | Central African Republic; Congo |
| Turnovers | (Kenya) Anthony Opingo (Kenya) Romanov Wasula | 11 | Mozambique; Nigeria |

=== Team Tournament Highs ===
Points

| Rank | Name | G | Pts | PPG |
|---|---|---|---|---|
| 1 | Egypt | 8 | 642 | 80.3 |
| 2 | Central African Republic | 7 | 478 | 68.3 |
| 3 | Nigeria | 8 | 541 | 67.6 |
| 4 | Angola | 8 | 532 | 66.5 |
| 5 | Mali | 8 | 507 | 63.4 |
| 6 | Congo | 7 | 423 | 60.4 |
| 7 | Senegal | 8 | 482 | 60.3 |
| 8 | Mozambique | 7 | 420 | 60 |
| 9 | Algeria | 8 | 476 | 59.5 |
| 10 | Ivory Coast | 8 | 445 | 55.6 |

Rebounds

| Rank | Name | G | Rbs | RPG |
|---|---|---|---|---|
| 1 | Nigeria | 7 | 327 | 40.9 |
| 2 | Congo | 7 | 272 | 38.9 |
| 3 | Mali | 7 | 305 | 38.1 |
| 4 | Kenya | 7 | 267 | 38.1 |
| 5 | Angola | 7 | 289 | 36.1 |
| 6 | Central African Republic | 7 | 253 | 36.1 |
| 7 | Egypt | 7 | 287 | 35.9 |
| 8 | Senegal | 7 | 284 | 35.5 |
| 9 | Algeria | | 266 | 33.2 |
| 10 | Ivory Coast | | 252 | 31.5 |

Assists

| Rank | Name | G | Ast | APG |
|---|---|---|---|---|
| 1 | Egypt | 8 | 128 | 16 |
| 2 | Mali | 8 | 88 | 11 |
| 3 | Nigeria | 8 | 80 | 10 |
| 4 | Central African Republic | 7 | 68 | 9.7 |
| 5 | Kenya | 7 | 56 | 8 |
| 6 | Algeria | 8 | 63 | 7.9 |
| 7 | Senegal | 8 | 61 | 7.6 |
| 8 | Angola | 8 | 60 | 7.5 |
| 9 | Morocco | 8 | 49 | 6.1 |
| 10 | Congo | 7 | 43 | 6.1 |

Steals

| Rank | Name | G | Sts | SPG |
|---|---|---|---|---|
| 1 | Mozambique | 7 | 104 | 14.9 |
| 2 | Mali | 8 | 115 | 14.4 |
| 3 | Central African Republic | 7 | 95 | 13.6 |
| 4 | Ivory Coast | 8 | 108 | 13.5 |
| 5 | Egypt | 8 | 105 | 13.1 |
| 6 | Angola | 8 | 102 | 12.8 |
| 7 | Senegal | 8 | 100 | 12.5 |
| 8 | Kenya | 7 | 73 | 10.4 |
| 9 | Nigeria | 8 | 81 | 10.1 |
| 10 | Algeria | 8 | 79 | 9.9 |

Blocks

| Rank | Name | G | Bks | BPG |
|---|---|---|---|---|
| 1 | Egypt | 8 | 32 | 4 |
| 2 | Mali | 8 | 31 | 3.9 |
| 3 | Senegal | 8 | 30 | 3.8 |
| 4 | Nigeria | 8 | 29 | 3.6 |
| 5 | Congo | 7 | 21 | 3 |
| 6 | Angola | 8 | 23 | 2.9 |
| 7 | Ivory Coast | 8 | 17 | 2.1 |
| 8 | Morocco | 8 | 15 | 1.9 |
| 9 | Central African Republic | 7 | 13 | 1.9 |
| 9 | Kenya | 7 | 13 | 1.9 |

Turnovers

| Rank | Name | G | Tos | TPG |
|---|---|---|---|---|
| 1 | Kenya | 7 | 210 | 30 |
| 2 | Morocco | 8 | 182 | 22.8 |
| 3 | Central African Republic | 7 | 158 | 22.6 |
| 4 | Mozambique | 7 | 155 | 22.1 |
| 5 | Ivory Coast | 8 | 172 | 21.5 |
| 6 | Mali | 8 | 166 | 20.8 |
| 7 | Nigeria | 8 | 162 | 20.3 |
| 8 | Egypt | 8 | 157 | 19.6 |
| 9 | Algeria | 8 | 155 | 19.4 |
| 9 | Angola | 8 | 155 | 19.4 |

2-point field goal percentage

| Pos | Name | A | M | % |
|---|---|---|---|---|
| 1 | Egypt | 325 | 191 | 58.8 |
| 2 | Algeria | 311 | 151 | 48.6 |
| 3 | Senegal | 342 | 151 | 44.2 |
| 4 | Nigeria | 370 | 163 | 44.1 |
| 5 | Mali | 346 | 152 | 43.9 |
| 6 | Angola | 353 | 154 | 43.6 |
| 7 | Central African Republic | 317 | 138 | 43.5 |
| 8 | Congo | 352 | 140 | 39.8 |
| 9 | Ivory Coast | 321 | 127 | 39.6 |
| 10 | Morocco | 269 | 106 | 39.4 |

3-point field goal percentage

| Pos | Name | A | M | % |
|---|---|---|---|---|
| 1 | Nigeria | 125 | 41 | 32.8 |
| 2 | Angola | 129 | 35 | 27.1 |
| 3 | Egypt | 161 | 41 | 25.5 |
| 4 | Central African Republic | 103 | 26 | 25.2 |
| 5 | Mozambique | 134 | 31 | 23.1 |
| 6 | Mali | 153 | 34 | 22.2 |
| 7 | Morocco | 159 | 33 | 20.8 |
| 8 | Algeria | 153 | 31 | 20.3 |
| 9 | Ivory Coast | 130 | 25 | 19.2 |
| 10 | Senegal | 152 | 29 | 19.1 |

Free throw percentage

| Pos | Name | A | M | % |
|---|---|---|---|---|
| 1 | Mali | 156 | 101 | 64.7 |
| 2 | Egypt | 214 | 137 | 64 |
| 3 | Ivory Coast | 189 | 116 | 61.4 |
| 4 | Nigeria | 154 | 92 | 59.7 |
| 5 | Angola | 206 | 119 | 57.8 |
| 6 | Morocco | 164 | 94 | 57.3 |
| 7 | Central African Republic | 217 | 124 | 57.1 |
| 8 | Mozambique | 184 | 105 | 57.1 |
| 9 | Congo | 99 | 50 | 50.5 |
| 10 | Senegal | 185 | 93 | 50.3 |

=== Team Game highs ===
| Department | Name | Total | Opponent |
|---|---|---|---|
| Points | Egypt | 105 | Mozambique |
| Rebounds | Kenya | 56 | Mozambique |
| Assists | Egypt | 22 | Mozambique |
| Steals | Mozambique | 32 | Kenya |
| Blocks | Senegal | 8 | Mozambique |
| 2-point field goal percentage | Egypt | 75% (33/44) | Mozambique |
| 3-point field goal percentage | Central African Republic | 47.1% (8/17) | Mozambique |
| Free throw percentage | Ivory Coast; Mali | 77.8% (7/9) | Kenya; Senegal |
| Turnovers | Kenya | 46 | Mozambique |

== See also ==
- 2009 FIBA Africa Championship
