= 2006 FIBA Africa Under-18 Championship =

2006 FIBA U18 AfroBasket
12th FIBA Under-18 African Basketball Championship

Tournament details
- Host country: South Africa
- Dates: 28 July – 6 August 2006
- Teams: 9
- Venue: 1 (in 1 host city)

Final positions
- Champions: Nigeria (7th title)

Tournament statistics
- MVP: (Mali) Waly Coulibaly
- Top scorer: (Republic of the Congo) Ibaka 18.6
- Top rebounds: (Republic of the Congo) Ibaka 13.8
- Top assists: (Guinea) Camara 5.4
- PPG (Team): Nigeria 83.3
- RPG (Team): Nigeria 60.8
- APG (Team): Nigeria 16.7

Official website
- 2006 FIBA Africa Under-18 Championship

The 2006 FIBA Africa Under-18 Championship was the 12th U-18 FIBA Africa championship, played under the auspices of the Fédération Internationale de Basketball, the world basketball sport governing body. The tournament was held from 28 July – 6 August 2006 in Durban, South Africa, contested by 9 national teams and won by Nigeria.

The tournament qualified the winner and the runner-up for the 2007 FIBA Under-19 World Championship.

== Format ==
- The 12 teams were divided into two groups (Groups A+B) for the preliminary round.
- Round robin for the preliminary round; the top four teams from each group advanced to the quarterfinals.
- From there on a knockout system was used until the final.

== Draw ==
Group A	Group B
Congo; Mali; Mozambique; South Africa	Angola; Guinea; Ivory Coast; Kenya; Nigeria

== Preliminary round ==
=== Group A ===
Qualified for the semi-finals

Team	W	L	PF	PA	Diff	Pts.
Mali	3	0	186	127	+59	6
Congo	2	1	187	143	+44	5
South Africa	1	2	155	191	-36	4
Mozambique	0	3	138	205	-67	3

28 July
19:00

Boxscore

South Africa	46–71	Congo
Scoring by quarter: 14-23, 2-23, 17-13, 13-12
Pts: Sithole 17; Rebs: Sithole, Acutt 9 Asts: Manqele 4		Pts: Ibaka 23; Rebs: Ibaka 19; Asts: Sow 7

Durban

30 July
17:00

Boxscore

Mozambique	34–73	Mali
Scoring by quarter: 6-18, 14-13, 10-18, 4-24
Pts: Xerinda 11; Rebs: Canivete 8 Asts: Xerinda 2		Pts: Coulibaly 17; Rebs: Kone 10; Asts: Tangara 4

Durban

31 July
15:00

Boxscore

Congo	66–44	Mozambique
Scoring by quarter: 24-8, 11-17, 9-9, 22-10
Pts: Ibaka 17; Rebs: Ibaka 20; Asts: N'Gampo 4		Pts: Mazive 15; Rebs: Canivete 10; Asts: three players 2

Durban

31 July
19:00

Boxscore

Mali	60–43	South Africa
Scoring by quarter: 17-10, 15-15, 9-8, 19-10
Pts: Coulibaly 22; Rebs: Kone 10; Asts: Toure 5		Pts: Sithole 15; Rebs: Sithole 7 Asts: Khumalo 2

Durban

1 August
19:00

Boxscore

Mozambique	60–66	South Africa
Scoring by quarter: 16-19, 15-15, 10-13, 19-19
Pts: Mazive 18; Rebs: Mazive 22; Asts: Ivaldo 7		Pts: Sithole 24; Rebs: Acutt 14; Asts: Manqele 4

Durban

2 August
19:00

Boxscore

Mali	53–50	Congo
Scoring by quarter: 13-12, 14-12, 16-10, 10-16
Pts: Coulibaly 23; Rebs: Samake 9 Asts: three players 3		Pts: Djio 12; Rebs: Wamba 11; Asts: Sow 3

Durban

=== Group B ===
Qualified for the semi-finals

Team	W	L	PF	PA	Diff	Pts.
Nigeria	4	0	344	225	+119	8
Angola	3	1	257	202	+55	7
Guinea	2	2	248	260	-12	6
Ivory Coast	1	3	246	283	-37	5
Kenya	0	4	231	356	-125	4

29 July
17:00

Boxscore

Kenya	72–103	Nigeria
Scoring by quarter: 16-19, 16-25, 13-37, 27-22
Pts: Oduor 20; Rebs: Nyadaro 10; Asts: Menya 4		Pts: Omorogbe 20; Rebs: Omori 15; Asts: Oyalade 9

Durban

3 August
16:00

Boxscore

Ivory Coast	60–66	Guinea
Scoring by quarter: 15-7, 15-19, 15-16, 15-24
Pts: Dembele, Dja 14; Rebs: Dembele 8 Asts: Kouzia 3		Pts: Tounkara 21; Rebs: Camara 9 Asts: Camara 7

Durban

30 July
15:00

Boxscore

Kenya	42–86	Angola
Scoring by quarter: 7-24, 9-13, 14-24, 12-25
Pts: Menya 13; Rebs: Munica 8 Asts: Oluoch 2		Pts: E.Ferreira 20; Rebs: Vander, P.Barros 8 Asts: E.Ferreira 3

Durban

30 July
19:00

Boxscore

Guinea	51–85	Nigeria
Scoring by quarter: 11-22, 16-23, 16-18, 8-22
Pts: Sangaré 10; Rebs: Sangaré 9 Asts: three players 2		Pts: Ikyaator; Rebs: Alabi; Asts: Yusuf

Durban

31 July
11:00

Boxscore

Ivory Coast	83–53	Kenya
Scoring by quarter: 14-19, 22-12, 20-11, 27-11
Pts: Dja 15; Rebs: Dja 15; Asts: Kouakou 3		Pts: Oduor 13; Rebs: Oduor 8 Asts: Menya, Wanjara 2

Durban

31 July
17:00

Boxscore

Angola	48–64	Nigeria
Scoring by quarter: 9-18, 10-12, 15-19, 14-15
Pts: A.Simões 13; Rebs: A.Simões 14; Asts: H.Gonçalves, S.João 1		Pts: Alabi 14; Rebs: Alabi, Yusuf 11; Asts: four players 2

Durban

1 August
15:00

Boxscore

Guinea	47–51	Angola
Scoring by quarter: 11-12, 8-10, 17-12, 11-17
Pts: A.Conde 10; Rebs: Sangaré 11; Asts: Camara 4		Pts: F.Luano 13; Rebs: A.Simões 8 Asts: A.Simões 2

Durban

1 August
17:00

Boxscore

Nigeria	92–54	Ivory Coast
Scoring by quarter: 24-14, 23-17, 20-9, 25-14
Pts: Alabi 23; Rebs: Alabi 18; Asts: Daudu 6		Pts: Akasson 10; Rebs: Kouakou 11; Asts: Akasson 2

Durban

2 August
15:00

Boxscore

Guinea	84–64	Kenya
Scoring by quarter: 15-20, 22-13, 25-14, 22-17
Pts: Tounkara 28; Rebs: Sangaré 11; Asts: Camara 7		Pts: Oduor 23; Rebs: Nyadaro 12; Asts: Menya 7

Durban

2 August
17:00

Boxscore

Angola	72–49	Ivory Coast
Scoring by quarter: 17-13, 20-11, 15-19, 20-6
Pts: A.Simões 27; Rebs: A.Simões 12; Asts: H.Gonçalves 3		Pts: Dja 15; Rebs: Barou 9 Asts: Kouzia, Toh 2

Durban

== Knockout stage ==
Championship bracket

Semi-finals
Sat 5 Aug 2006 – 12:00
Angola	60
Mali	68
Sat 5 Aug 2006 – 14:00
Congo	57
Nigeria	87

Final
Sun 6 Aug 2006 – 14:30
Mali	41
Nigeria	69
3rd place
Sun 6 Aug 2006 – 12:00
Angola	74
Congo	70

=== 7th place match ===
4 August
15:00

Boxscore

Mozambique	48–62	Ivory Coast
Scoring by quarter: 19-16, 10-20, 8-19, 11-7
Pts: Monjane 14; Rebs: Mazive 16; Asts: three players 2		Pts: four players 10; Rebs: Barou 7 Asts: Toh 6

Durban

=== 5th place match ===
4 August
17:00

Boxscore

South Africa	45–62	Guinea
Scoring by quarter: 11-15, 8-23, 14-11, 12-13
Pts: Khumalo 13; Rebs: Khumalo 9 Asts: four players 2		Pts: Tounkara 21; Rebs: Sanoh 17; Asts: Camara 7

Durban

=== Semifinals ===
5 August
12:00

Boxscore

Angola	60–68	Mali
Scoring by quarter: 9-21, 13-15, 23-15, 15-17
Pts: E.Ferreira 18; Rebs: A.Simões 8 Asts: F.Luano 3		Pts: Coulibaly 26; Rebs: Kone 13; Asts: Tangara 7

Durban

5 August
14:00

Boxscore

Congo	57–87	Nigeria
Scoring by quarter: 22-21, 18-28, 9-24, 8-14
Pts: Nkakou 11; Rebs: Ibaka 7 Asts: five players 1		Pts: Ikyaator 22; Rebs: Baraya 18; Asts: Daudu 6

Durban

=== Bronze medal game ===
6 August
12:00

Boxscore

Angola	74–70	Congo
Scoring by quarter: 8-13, 18-17, 26-20, 22-20
Pts: Ad.Ramos 18; Rebs: F.Luano 10; Asts: H.Gonçalves 6		Pts: Ibaka 37; Rebs: Ibaka 14; Asts: N'Gampo 7

Durban

=== Gold medal game ===
6 August
14:30

Boxscore

Mali	41–69	Nigeria
Scoring by quarter: 11-19, 6-11, 7-24, 17-15
Pts: Toure 12; Rebs: Kone 13; Asts: Tangara 4		Pts: Alabi 17; Rebs: Alabi, Omori 9 Asts: Ikyaator 6

Durban

== Final standings ==
Qualified for the 2007 FIBA U19 World Championship

Rank	Team	Record
Gold medal	Nigeria	6–0
Silver medal	Mali	4–1
Bronze medal	Angola	4–2
4.	Congo	2–3
5.	Guinea	3–2
6.	South Africa	1–3
7.	Ivory Coast	2–3
8.	Mozambique	0–4
9.	Kenya	0–4

Nigeria roster
Abel Baraya, Ahmed Ayodele, Daniel Daudu, Faruk Oyalade, Franck Eze, George Ehiagwina, Ibrahim Yusuf, Mbaram Omori, Nosa Omorogbe, Oluwaseyi Ayodele, Orseer Ikyaator, Solomon Alabi, Coach: Adeka Dauda

== Awards ==
2006 FIBA Africa Under-18 Championship winner

Nigeria
Seventh title

Most Valuable Player
(Mali) Waly Coulibaly
