= Mansour Kasse =

Senegalese basketball player (born 1992)

Villars Basket
- Position: Power forward

Personal information
- Born: 28 June 1992 (age 34) Dakar, Senegal
- Listed height: 6 ft 10 in (2.08 m)
- Listed weight: 222 lb (101 kg)

Career information
- Playing career: 2010–present

Career history
- 2010–2012: Real Madrid B
- 2012–2013: Basket Navarra Club
- 2013–2016: Cáceres Patrimonio de la Humanidad
- 2016–2017: JS Kairouan
- 2017: CB Morón
- 2017–2018: Vevey Riviera Basket
- 2018–2019: Sitra Club
- 2019: Al-Riffa
- 2019–2020: Al Hala SC
- 2020–2021: Samaheej
- 2021: FC Cartagena CB
- 2021–2022: Samaheej
- 2022: CD Huelva Baloncesto
- 2022–present: Villars Basket

Mansour Kasse (born 28 June 1992 in Dakar, Senegal) is a Senegalese basketball player. He represents the Senegal national basketball team in international competition.

== Professional career ==
Kasse arrived in summer 2010 to Real Madrid from Baloncesto Majadahonda, after an outstanding performance at the U-18 Spanish basketball championship.

In the 2011–12 season he was a dominant power forward in Real Madrid B at Liga EBA, coached by Alberto Angulo. He trained and travelled with Real Madrid's first team, in Liga ACB and Euroleague.

In August 2012 he signed for the LEB Oro team Basket Navarra Club. On 7 September he made his debut in the league against Palencia Baloncesto, scoring 17 points.

In summer 2013 he signed for Cáceres Patrimonio de la Humanidad. In week 16 he was named as the best center of the league. In his second season in the club, Cáceres clinched the title and promoted to LEB Oro.

In the summer of 2016 he signed for JS Kairouan of the Tunisian Division I Basketball League, where he managed to lead his team into the playoffs for the title, after averaging 17.4 points, 10.2 rebounds and 1.8 blocks per game. After finishing the season in Tunisia, and after playing for the Senegal National team in March, 2017, he returned to Spain to join the CB Morón, as a reinforcement to dispute the playoffs of promotion to LEB Oro. During the playoffs he's averaged 13.5 points, 7.5 rebounds, 2 steals and 1 block in 25 minutes per game, and he was named the MVP of the second playoff day.

In the summer of 2017 he signed for Vevey Riviera Basket of the LNA, the Swiss 1st Division.

In 2018/19 he’s played at the Bahrain Premier League, winning the Bahrain’s Cup, averaging 22.2 points, 15.7 rebounds and 2.4 blocks, coached by Sam Vincent (former NBA head coach and NBA champion as a player).From 2018 to 2022, Kasse has played for 4 teams at Bahrain Premier League: Sitra Club, Al-Riffa, Al Hala SC and Samaheej.

On February 19, 2022, Kasse signed with CD Huelva Baloncesto.

== National team career ==
Mansour Kasse has been international Under-16 and Under-18 with Senegal. At the age of 16 he played at the 2008 FIBA Africa Under-18 Championship, finishing the tournament in the fourth position.

In summer 2013 he was pre-selected with the Senegal National team to play in the 2013 FIBA Africa Championship.

In summer 2015 he was pre-selected with the Senegal National team to play in the 2015 FIBA Africa Championship.

In March, 2017, he was selected to participate with the Senegal National team in the FIBA AfroBasket 2017 qualifiers. Mansour Kasse played 3 games, and Senegal qualified for the Tournament.

== Trophies ==
=== Cáceres Patrimonio de la Humanidad ===
- LEB Plata: (1)
  - Champion 2014–15
- Bahrain Premier League Cup: (1)
  - Champion 2019
