= Morocco men's national under-18 basketball team =

Morocco
- FIBA zone: FIBA Africa
- National federation: FRMBB
- Coach: Mohamed Nizar Mesbahi
- Nickname: The Lions de l'Atlas

U19 World Cup
- Appearances: None

U18 AfroBasket
- Appearances: 4
- Medals: None
Home	Away

The Morocco men's national under-18 basketball team is a national basketball team of Morocco, administered by the Moroccan Royal Basketball Federation. It represents the country in men's international under-18 basketball competitions.

In 2024, the team reached the semi-finals of FIBA U18 AfroBasket for the first time in its history.

== FIBA U18 AfroBasket record ==
Year	Reached	Position	Pld	W	L	PF	PA	PD	Ref
(Egypt) Cairo 1977	Did not qualify								
(Angola) Luanda 1980	Did not qualify								
(Mozambique) Maputo 1982	Did not qualify								
(Egypt) Cairo 1984	Did not qualify								
(Nigeria) Abuja 1987	Did not qualify								
(Mozambique) Maputo 1988	Did not qualify								
(Angola) Luanda 1990	Did not qualify								
(Cameroon) Yaoundé 1994	Did not qualify								
(Egypt) Cairo 1998	Round robin	6th	5	0	5	237	356	–119	
(Guinea) Conakry 2000	Did not qualify								
(Egypt) Cairo 2002	Did not qualify								
(South Africa) Durban 2006	Did not qualify								
(Egypt) Alexandria 2008	Quarter-finals	8th	8	2	6	405	487	–82	
(Rwanda) Kigali 2010	Did not qualify								
(Mozambique) Maputo 2012	Group stage	9th	7	2	5	378	432	–54	
(Madagascar) Antananarivo 2014	Did not qualify								
(Rwanda) Kigali 2016	Did not qualify								
(Mali) Bamako 2018	Did not qualify								
(Egypt) Cairo 2020	Did not qualify								
(Madagascar) Antananarivo 2022	Did not qualify								
(South Africa) Pretoria 2024	Semi-finals	4th	6	3	3	380	338	+42	
(Ivory Coast) Abidjan 2026	Classification round	11th	6	2	4	325	343	–74	
Total	5/22	0 titles	32	9	23	1,725	1,956	–287	—

== See also ==
- Morocco men's national basketball team
- Morocco men's national under-16 basketball team
