= 1994 FIBA Africa Under-18 Championship =

1994 FIBA U18 AfroBasket
8th FIBA Under-18 African Basketball Championship

Tournament details
- Host country: Cameroon
- Dates: July 18–25, 1994
- Teams: 7 (from 53 federations)
- Venue: 1 (in 1 host city)

Final positions
- Champions: Nigeria (3rd title)

Official website
- 1994 FIBA Africa Under-18 Championship

The 1994 FIBA Africa Under-18 Championship was the 8th FIBA Africa Under-18 Championship, played under the rules of FIBA, the world governing body for basketball, and the FIBA Africa thereof. The tournament took place in Yaoundé, Cameroon from July 18 to 25 1994.

Nigeria ended the round-robin tournament with a 6–0 unbeaten record to win their third title.

Both winner and runner-up qualified for the 1995 FIBA Under-19 World Championship.

== Participating teams ==
Angola
Cameroon
Central African Republic
Gabon
Guinea
Mali
Nigeria

== Schedule ==
P	Team	M	W	L	PF	PA	Diff	Pts.
1	Nigeria	6	6	0	469	364	+105	12
2	Angola	6	4	2	459	471	-12	10
3	Guinea	6	4	2	440	359	+81	10
4	Cameroon	6	3	3	410	420	-10	9
5	Central African R.	6	3	3	463	379	+84	9
6	Gabon	6	1	5	354	547	-193	7
7	Mali	6	0	6	413	468	-55	6

Boxscore

Cameroon	51–69	Guinea
Scoring by half: 23-39, 28-30

Yaoundé

Boxscore

Angola	49–79	Central African Rep.
Scoring by half: 20-35, 29-44

Boxscore

Nigeria	75–58	Mali
Scoring by half: 37-34, 38-24

Boxscore

Central African Rep.	59–62	Nigeria
Scoring by half: 22-21, 37-41

Yaoundé

Boxscore

Gabon	68–87	Angola
Scoring by half: 31-52, 37-35

Boxscore

Cameroon	72–68	Mali
Scoring by half: 40-30, 32-38

Boxscore

Guinea	82–74	Mali
Scoring by half: 45-39, 37-35

Yaoundé

Boxscore

Gabon	48–95	Nigeria
Scoring by half: 23-42, 25-53

Boxscore

Cameroon	72–67	Central African Rep.
Scoring by half: 34-31, 38-36

Boxscore

Gabon	56–78	Cameroon
Scoring by half: 20-39, 36-39

Yaoundé

Boxscore

Guinea	77–58	Central African Rep.
Scoring by half: 35-25, 42-33

Boxscore

Angola	81–99	Nigeria
Scoring by half: 31-36, 50-63

Boxscore

Mali	59–73	Central African Rep.
Scoring by half: 25-28, 34-45

Yaoundé

Boxscore

Angola	80–72	Cameroon
Scoring by half: 35-46, 45-26

Boxscore

Guinea	84–42	Gabon
Scoring by half: 40-35, 44-7

Boxscore

Nigeria	80–65	Cameroon
Scoring by half: 38-34, 42-31

Yaoundé

Boxscore

Mali	76–80	Gabon
Scoring by half: 17-37, 59-43

Boxscore

Angola	76–75	Guinea
Scoring by half: 27-44, 49-31

Boxscore

Central African Rep.	127–60	Gabon
Scoring by half: 59-29, 68-31

Yaoundé

Boxscore

Nigeria	58–53	Guinea
Scoring by half: 58-53, 26-19

Boxscore

Mali	78–86	Angola
Scoring by half: 44-50, 34-36

== Final standings ==
Qualified for the 1995 FIBA U19 World Championship

Rank	Team	Record
Gold medal	Nigeria	6–0
Silver medal	Angola	4–2
Bronze medal	Guinea	4–2
4	Cameroon	3–3
5	Central African R.	3–3
6	Morocco	1–5
7	Mali	0–6

== Awards ==
1994 FIBA Africa Under-18 Championship winner

Nigeria
Third title

Most Valuable Player

== See also ==
- 1995 FIBA Africa Championship
