= Jimmy Djimrabaye =

Central African basketball player

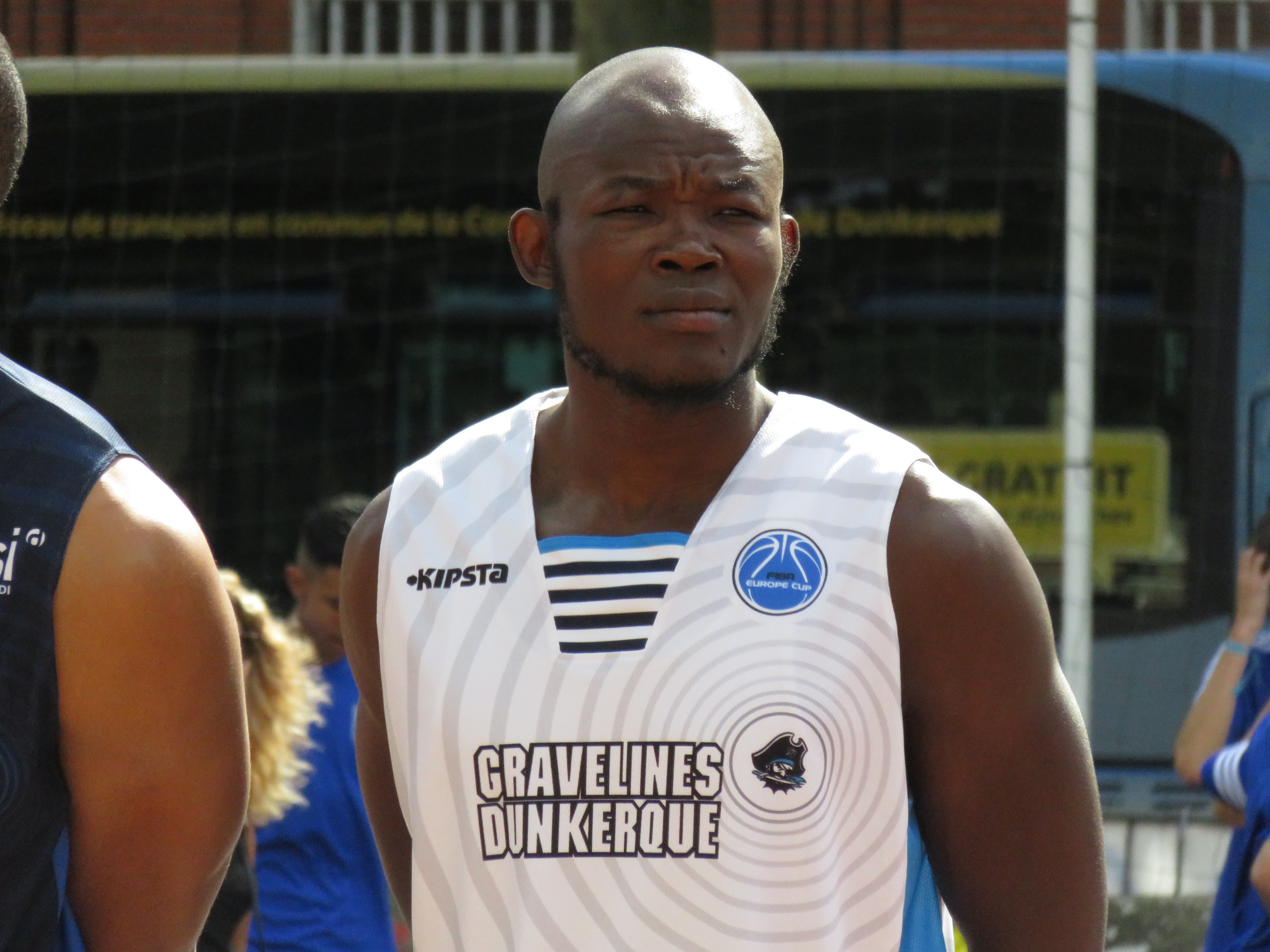
- Djimrabaye with BCM Gravelines in 2016

No. 35 – Bangui Sporting Club
- Position: Power forward / center
- League: Road to BAL

Personal information
- Born: April 8, 1992 (age 34) Bangui, Central African Republic
- Listed height: 6 ft 8 in (2.03 m)
- Listed weight: 230 lb (104 kg)

Career information
- Playing career: 2007–present

Career history
- 2007–2009: Hit Trésor
- 2009–2012: Vichy
- 2012–2013: BCM Gravelines
- 2013–2014: Denain-Voltaire
- 2014–2015: ESSM Le Portel
- 2015–2016: Berck BC
- 2016–2017: BCM Gravelines
- 2017–2018: Orléans Loiret Basket
- 2018–2021: UJAP Quimper 29
- 2021–2022: Vichy-Clermont
- 2022–2023: Alliance Sport Alsace
- 2022–present: Bangui Sporting Club

Jimmy Djimrabaye (born April 8, 1992) is a Central African professional basketball player for Bangui Sporting Club. During his career, he has played in France for several teams in the LNB Pro A and LNB Pro B.

He also played in Africa, when in 2008, he played for Red Star Ndongo in the qualification games for the 2008 FIBA Africa Clubs Champions Cup. Fourteen years later, in 2022, Djimrabaye played with Bangui Sporting Club in the Road to BAL 2023.

== National team career ==
Djimrabaye represents Central African Republic in international competition. He competed for the national Under-18 team in the 2008 FIBA Africa Under-18 Championship. Djimrabaye competed with the senior team for his country at the AfroBasket tournaments of 2009, 2011, 2015, 2017 and 2021. Their best results were the 6th place in 2009 and 2011.
