= Guinea men's national under-18 basketball team =

Guinea
- FIBA zone: FIBA Africa
- National federation: Fédération Guinéenne de Basket-Ball

U19 World Cup
- Appearances: None

U18 AfroBasket
- Appearances: 7
- Medals: (gold) Gold: 1 (2000); (bronze) Bronze: 2 (1987, 1994)

The Guinea men's national under-18 basketball team is a national basketball team of Guinea, administered by the Guinean Basketball Federation. It represents the country in international under-18 men's basketball competitions.

At the 2020 FIBA U18 African Championship in Cairo, Egypt, the Guineans finished fourth. The team was coached by Željko Zečević who later became head coach of Guinea's senior team.

== U18 AfroBasket record ==
Year	Pos.	Pld	W	L
(Nigeria) 1987	3rd place, bronze medalist(s)	?	?	?
(Cameroon) 1994	3rd place, bronze medalist(s)	6	4	2
(Guinea) 2000	1st place, gold medalist(s)	6	5	1
(South Africa) 2006	5th	5	3	2
(Mali) 2018	9th	7	2	5
(Egypt) 2020	4th	5	1	4
(Madagascar) 2022	6th	7	3	4
Total	7/21	36	18	18

== See also ==
- Guinea men's national basketball team
- Guinea men's national under-16 basketball team
- Guinea women's national under-18 basketball team
