= Senegal men's national under-19 basketball team =

Senegal
- FIBA zone: FIBA Africa
- National federation: Fédération Sénégalaise de Basket-Ball

U19 World Cup
- Appearances: 4
- Medals: None

U18 AfroBasket
- Appearances: 8
- Medals: (gold) Gold: 1 (2012); (silver) Silver: 2 (2018, 2020); (bronze) Bronze: 2 (1982, 2024)

The Senegal men's national under-18 and under-19 basketball team is a national basketball team of Senegal, administered by the Fédération Sénégalaise de Basket-Ball. It represents the country in international under-18 and under-19 men's basketball competitions.

== FIBA U18 AfroBasket participations ==
Year	Result
1982	3rd place, bronze medalist(s)
2000	4th
2008	4th
2012	1st place, gold medalist(s)
2018	2nd place, silver medalist(s)
2020	2nd place, silver medalist(s)
2022	5th
2024	3rd place, bronze medalist(s)
2026	2nd place, silver medalist(s)

== FIBA U19 World Cup participations ==
Year	Result
2013	16th
2019	15th
2021	7th
2027	Qualified

== See also ==
- Senegal men's national basketball team
- Senegal men's national under-16 basketball team
- Senegal women's national under-19 basketball team
