= Cameroon men's national under-18 basketball team =

Basketball team representing Cameroon

Cameroon
- FIBA zone: FIBA Africa
- National federation: Fédération Camerounaise de Basketball

U19 World Cup
- Appearances: 1

U18 AfroBasket
- Appearances: 3
- Medals: (silver) Silver: 1 (2024); (bronze) Bronze: 1 (1990)

The Cameroon men's national under-18 and under-19 basketball team is a national basketball team of Cameroon, administered by the Fédération Camerounaise de Basketball. It represents the country in international under-18 and under-19 men's basketball competitions.

The team competed three times at the FIBA U18 AfroBasket and won two medals there and with the silver medal in 2024, they qualified for the FIBA Under-19 Basketball World Cup for the first time.

== Tournament record ==
=== FIBA Under-19 Basketball World Cup ===
Year	Result
2025	14th

=== FIBA U18 AfroBasket ===
Year	Result
1990	3rd place, bronze medalist(s)
1994	4th
2024	2nd place, silver medalist(s)

== See also ==
- Cameroon men's national basketball team
- Cameroon women's national under-18 basketball team
