= Central African Republic men's national under-18 basketball team =

Central African Republic
- FIBA zone: FIBA Africa
- National federation: Fédération Centrafricaine de Basketball

U19 World Cup
- Appearances: None

U18 AfroBasket
- Appearances: 4
- Medals: (silver) Silver: 2 (1977, 1980)

The Central African Republic men's national under-18 basketball team is a national basketball team of the Central African Republic, administered by the Fédération Centrafricaine de Basketball. It represents the country in international under-18 men's basketball competitions.

== FIBA U18 AfroBasket participations ==
Year	Result
1977	2nd place, silver medalist(s)
1980	2nd place, silver medalist(s)
1994	5th
2008	9th

== See also ==
- Central African Republic men's national basketball team
- Central African Republic men's national under-16 basketball team
- Central African Republic women's national under-18 basketball team
