= Miguel Kiala =

Angolan basketball player (born 1990)

No. 11 – Interclube
- Position: Center
- League: BAI Basket; Africa Champions Cup

Personal information
- Born: November 10, 1990 (age 36) Luanda, Angola
- Listed height: 204 cm (6.69 ft)
- Listed weight: 91 kg (201 lb)

Career history
- 2008–2009: CDUAN
- 2010–present: Petro Atlético
Medals
Men's basketball
Representing Angola
FIBA Africa Under-18 Championship
| Silver medal – second place | Alexandria 2008 | Angola U18 |
AfroBasket
| Silver medal – second place | Antananarivo 2011 | Angola |
FIBA Africa Clubs Champions Cup
| Silver medal – second place | Malabo 2012 | Petro Atlético |

Miguel Kiala (born 10 November 1990 in Luanda, Angola), is a professional Angolan basketball player. Kiala, who is 204 cm (6 ft 8 in) in height and weighs 91 kg (201 lb), plays as a center. He represented Angola at the 2011 FIBA Africa Championship. Kiala was the top rebounder at the 2009 U-19 FIBA World Championship in New Zealand, with an average 13.6 rpg.

He is currently playing for Petro Atlético at the Angolan major basketball league BAI Basket.

== Achievements ==
| Top Rebounder | All Tournament Team |
|---|---|
| 2011 BAI Basket | |
| 2009 U-19 World Cup | |
| | 2008 U-18 AfroBasket |

== See also ==
- Angola national basketball team
