= Waly Coulibaly =

Malian basketball player (born 1988)

Personal information
- Born: February 10, 1988 (age 38) Bamako, Mali
- Listed height: 6 ft 3 in (1.91 m)
- Listed weight: 185 lb (84 kg)

Career information
- High school: The Patterson School (Lenoir, North Carolina)
- College: Chaminade (2009–2013)
- Playing career: 2007–present
- Position: Shooting guard

Career history
- 2007: Stade Malien

Waly Coulibaly (born February 10, 1988) is a Malian basketball player who last played for The Patterson School after previously playing for Stade Malien of the Malian Basketball League while in High School. He is also a member of the Mali national basketball team.

Coulibaly has starred for Mali since breaking onto the international scene as a 16-year-old. Coulibaly was the leading scorer at the along with Serge Ibaka at the 2006 FIBA Africa U-18 Championships, averaging 18.6 PPG. He scored a team-leading 26 points in a semifinal victory against Angola that earned Mali a berth at the FIBA Under-19 World Championship 2007. Although Mali struggled to a 15th-place finish in this tournament after being placed in a group with the gold medal-winning host country Serbia, eventual silver medalist United States, and China, Coulibaly was the tournament's fourth leading scorer with 19.6 PPG.

Coulibaly played in the 2007 FIBA Africa Championship as a 19-year-old, but saw little action for the team. Two years later, however, Coulibaly had a breakout performance at the 2009 FIBA Africa Championship for quarterfinalist Mali, averaging 14.6 PPG on a Mali team that came within one point of advancing to the semifinals after losing 74–73 to Tunisia.
