= Solomon Alabi =

Nigerian basketball player (born 1988)

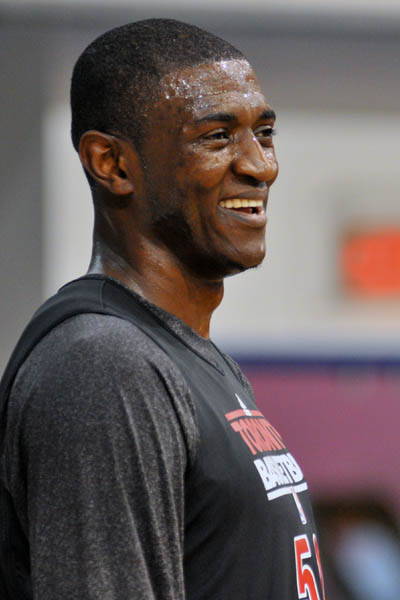
- Alabi with the Toronto Raptors in 2010

Personal information
- Born: March 21, 1988 (age 38) Kaduna, Nigeria
- Listed height: 7 ft 1 in (2.16 m)
- Listed weight: 250 lb (113 kg)

Career information
- High school: Montverde Academy (Montverde, Florida)
- College: Florida State (2007–2010)
- NBA draft: 2010: 2nd round, 50th overall pick
- Drafted by: Dallas Mavericks
- Playing career: 2010–2018
- Position: Center
- Number: 50

Career history
- 2010–2012: Toronto Raptors
- 2010–2011: →Erie BayHawks
- 2012: →Bakersfield Jam
- 2012–2013: Idaho Stampede
- 2013: Ikaros Kallitheas B.C.
- 2013–2014: Yulon Dinos
- 2015: Barako Bull Energy
- 2016–2017: Toyotsu Fighting Eagles Nagoya
- 2017–2018: Fukushima Firebonds

Career highlights
- Third-team All-ACC (2010); 2× ACC All-Defensive team (2009, 2010); ACC All-Freshman team (2009)
- Stats at NBA.com
- Stats at Basketball Reference

Makafan Solomon Alabi (born March 21, 1988) is a Nigerian former professional basketball player. He moved to the United States at the age of 17 to attend Montverde Academy. Alabi played college basketball for the Florida State Seminoles where he was a two-time Atlantic Coast Conference (ACC) All-Defensive team selection in both his freshman and sophomore years. He was selected by the Dallas Mavericks as the 50th overall pick in the 2010 NBA draft and played two seasons in the National Basketball Association (NBA) for the Toronto Raptors. Alabi played one season in the NBA Development League and finished his career overseas with stints in Greece, Taiwan, the Philippines and Japan.

== Early life ==
Alabi was raised in a village near the town of Zaria in Kaduna State. His father is a retired police officer and he has five siblings. Alabi grew up playing soccer, tennis, ping-pong, volleyball, handball and field hockey. The only basketball court near his home was on sand and used for playing soccer. He started playing basketball during his adolescence and began to pursue it seriously once he learned that he could achieve a college scholarship by playing. Alabi attended a camp run by Masai Ujiri and earned a scholarship to attend Montverde Academy.

Alabi moved to the United States in June 2005. He was coached at Montverde Academy by Kevin Sutton. Alabi was an all-state performer and helped lead Montverde Academy to a perfect 30–0 record as a senior. He averaged 17.5 points, 11.4 rebounds and 6 blocks per game during his senior season.

== College career ==
After breaking his leg 10 games into his freshman year, Alabi had to take a medical redshirt. As a redshirt freshman, he earned All-ACC Freshman Team honors by averaging 8.4 points per game and leading the ACC in blocks with 2.1 per game. For his great shot-blocking ability, he was named to the ACC All-Defensive team in 2008–2009.

As a redshirt sophomore, Alabi ranked 26th in the nation in blocked shots with an average of 2.39 while increasing his scoring average to 11.7 points per game. On April 23, 2010, he declared himself eligible for the 2010 NBA draft.

== Professional career ==
On June 24, 2010, Alabi was drafted by the Dallas Mavericks with the 50th pick, and traded to the Toronto Raptors for cash considerations.

On July 8, 2010, he signed a contract with the Toronto Raptors. The Raptors assigned him to the Erie BayHawks on November 15, 2010. He was recalled on December 9, 2010, sent back to Erie on January 6, 2011, and recalled once again by the Raptors on January 14, 2011. The Raptors assigned him to the BayHawks for a third time on March 9, 2011. Afterwards, Alabi was recalled up to Toronto for a third time on April 5, 2011.

On January 4, 2012, Alabi was assigned to the Bakersfield Jam of the D-League. He was recalled on January 22, 2012.

Alabi's final NBA game was played on April 26, 2012, against the New Jersey Nets, the final game of the regular season. In that game, Alabi recorded career highs of 11 points, 19 rebounds and 3 blocks in 40 minutes.

On October 1, 2012, Solomon signed with the New Orleans Hornets. However, he was released on October 27, four days before the Hornets' season opener.

On December 28, 2012, Alabi joined the Idaho Stampede. He was released on March 1, 2013.

On March 21, 2013, he signed with the Greek first division basketball club Ikaros Kallitheas B.C.

On September 28, 2013, Alabi signed with the Philadelphia 76ers. However, he was waived on October 5. He later signed with the Yulon Dinos of Taiwan for the 2013–14 season.

In January 2015, Alabi signed with the Barako Bull Energy for the 2015 PBA Commissioner's Cup.

Alabai retired from his basketball career in 2018 to spend more time with his family.

== National team career ==
Alabi started for the Nigerian Junior National Team at the 2007 Nike All-American camp. He also helped Nigeria qualify for the 2007 FIBA Under-19 World Championship. He was selected for the 2007 Nike Hoop Summit, representing the World Select Team, where he led all players in blocked shots.

== Career statistics ==
Legend
GP	Games played	GS	Games started	MPG	Minutes per game
FG%	Field goal percentage	3P%	3-point field goal percentage	FT%	Free throw percentage
RPG	Rebounds per game	APG	Assists per game	SPG	Steals per game
BPG	Blocks per game	PPG	Points per game	**Bold**	Career high

=== NBA ===
==== Regular season ====
Year	Team	GP	GS	MPG	FG%	3P%	FT%	RPG	APG	SPG	BPG	PPG
2010–11	Toronto	12	0	4.9	.200	.000	.000	1.2	**.2**	**.2**	.2	.5
2011–12	Toronto	**14**	0	**8.7**	**.361**	.000	**.875**	**3.4**	**.2**	.1	**.6**	**2.4**
Career		26	0	7.0	.314	.000	.700	2.3	.2	.2	.4	1.5

=== NBA D-League ===
==== Regular season ====
Year	Team	GP	GS	MPG	FG%	3P%	FT%	RPG	APG	SPG	BPG	PPG
2010–11	Erie	**22**	**16**	18.6	**.517**	–	.714	5.3	.4	.5	1.8	7.2
2011–12	Bakersfield	9	8	**21.3**	.473	–	**.750**	**7.7**	**.8**	**.8**	**1.9**	**9.1**
2012–13	Idaho	18	6	15.6	.513	–	.533	5.5	.2	.4	.9	4.9
Career		49	30	18.0	.504	–	.688	5.8	.4	.5	1.5	6.7

== Personal life ==
Alabi has two children with his wife. They have lived in Seattle, Washington, since 2015.

Alabi returned to Florida State University and graduated in 2020 with a Bachelor of Science degree in interdisciplinary social science.

Alabi has worked as a real estate agent in Seattle since 2020.
