= Republic of the Congo men's national under-18 basketball team =

Republic of the Congo
- FIBA zone: FIBA Africa
- National federation: Fédération Congolaise de Basketball

U19 World Cup
- Appearances: None

U18 AfroBasket
- Appearances: 2 (2006, 2008)
- Medals: None

The Republic of the Congo men's national under-18 basketball team is a national basketball team of the Republic of the Congo, administered by the Fédération Congolaise de Basketball. It represents the country in international under-18 men's basketball competitions.

The most prominent player has been Serge Ibaka.

== FIBA U18 AfroBasket participations ==
Year	Result
2006	4th
2008	11th

== See also ==
- Republic of the Congo men's national basketball team
- Republic of the Congo men's national under-16 basketball team
