= Mozambique men's national under-18 basketball team =

Mozambique
- Joined FIBA: 1978
- FIBA zone: FIBA Africa
- National federation: Federação Moçambicana de Basquetebol

U19 World Cup
- Appearances: None

U18 AfroBasket
- Appearances: 9
- Medals: (silver) Silver: 2 (1982, 1988); (bronze) Bronze: 1 (1984)

The Mozambique men's national under-18 basketball team is a national basketball team of Mozambique, administered by the Federação Moçambicana de Basquetebol. It represents the country in men's international under-18 basketball competitions.

== FIBA U18 AfroBasket participations ==
Year	Result
1980	4th
1982	2nd place, silver medalist(s)
1984	3rd place, bronze medalist(s)
1988	2nd place, silver medalist(s)
2006	8th
2008	10th
2010	4th
2012	7th
2014	7th

== See also ==
- Mozambique men's national basketball team
- Mozambique men's national under-16 basketball team
- Mozambique women's national under-18 basketball team
