= Motaz Okasha =

Egyptian basketball player

No. 20 – Gezira
- Position: Point guard
- League: Egyptian Basketball Super League

Personal information
- Born: 14 February 1990 (age 36) Giza, Egypt
- Listed height: 6 ft 1 in (1.85 m)

Career information
- NBA draft: 2012: undrafted
- Playing career: 2010–present

Career history
- 2014–present: Gezira

Pellah Al Motaz Okasha (born 14 February 1990) is an Egyptian basketball player for Gezira of the Egyptian Basketball Premier League.

He represented Egypt's national basketball team at the 2017 Arab Nations Basketball Championship, where he recorded most minutes, assists and steals for his team and helped secure the gold medal.
