= Nigeria men's national under-19 basketball team =

Nigeria
- FIBA zone: FIBA Africa
- National federation: Nigeria Basketball Federation

U19 World Cup
- Appearances: 6
- Medals: None

U18 AfroBasket
- Appearances: 11
- Medals: (gold) Gold: 6 (1987, 1990, 1994, 1998, 2002, 2006); (bronze) Bronze: 3 (1980, 1988, 2008)

The Nigeria men's national under-18 and under-19 basketball team is a national basketball team of Nigeria, administered by the Nigeria Basketball Federation. It represents the country in international under-18 and under-19 basketball competitions.

== FIBA U18 AfroBasket participations ==
Year	Result
1980	3rd place, bronze medalist(s)
1987	1st place, gold medalist(s)
1988	3rd place, bronze medalist(s)
1990	1st place, gold medalist(s)
1994	1st place, gold medalist(s)
1998	1st place, gold medalist(s)
2002	1st place, gold medalist(s)
2006	1st place, gold medalist(s)
2008	3rd place, bronze medalist(s)
2010	9th
2024	7th
2026	9th

== FIBA Under-19 Basketball World Cup participations ==
Year	Result
1987	12th
1991	15th
1995	11th
1999	11th
2003	11th
2007	13th

== See also ==
- Nigeria men's national basketball team
- Nigeria men's national under-17 basketball team
- Nigeria women's national under-19 basketball team
