= AfroBasket 2017 squads =

This article displays the rosters for the participating teams at the AfroBasket 2017. The player ages are as of September 8, 2017, which was the first day of the tournament.

== Group A ==
=== DR Congo ===
DR Congo men's national basketball team - AfroBasket 2017 roster
Players
Coaches

Pos.	No.	Name	Age – Date of birth	Height	Club	Ctr.
G	4	Myck Kabongo	24 – 1 December 1992	1.91 m (6 ft 3 in)	Rayos de Hermosillo	(Mexico)
PG	5	Johnny Buzangu	29 – 9 July 1988	1.90 m (6 ft 3 in)
F	6	Chadrack Lufile	26 – 11 September 1990	2.06 m (6 ft 9 in)	Cape Breton Highlanders (basketball)	(Canada)
G	7	Maxi Munanga	25 – 25 December 1991	1.91 m (6 ft 3 in)	AS Salé (basketball)	(Morocco)
F	8	Chiza Aristote	25 – 27 July 1992	2.03 m (6 ft 8 in)	Jamestown Jackals	(United States)
F/C	9	Evariste Shonganya	25 – 6 April 1992	2.04 m (6 ft 8 in)	Koroivos B.C.	(Greece)
C	10	Mohamed Ntumba	32 – 18 February 1985	2.00 m (6 ft 7 in)	COD (basketball)	(Australia)
C	11	Pitchou Kambuy	28 – 12 December 1988	2.08 m (6 ft 10 in)	ASB Mazembe Katanga	(Democratic Republic of the Congo)
F	12	Docta Mutombo	36 – 2 July 1981	1.98 m (6 ft 6 in)
F	13	Eric Kibi	27 – 4 August 1990	1.98 m (6 ft 6 in)	Randers Cimbria	(Denmark)
C	14	Herve Kabasele	20 – 24 October 1996	2.08 m (6 ft 10 in)	CB Breogán	(Spain)
F	15	Rolly Fula	24 – 2 February 1993	1.98 m (6 ft 6 in)	ASB Mazembe Katanga	(Democratic Republic of the Congo)

Head coach

- (Democratic Republic of the Congo) Papy Kiembe

Assistant coach(es)

- (Democratic Republic of the Congo) Charly Kashala

Legend

- Club – describes last
  club before the tournament
- Age – describes age
  on 8 September 2017

== Group B ==
=== Central African Republic ===
Central African Republic men's national basketball team - AfroBasket 2017 roster
Players
Coaches

Pos.	No.	Name	Age – Date of birth	Height	Club	Ctr.
PG	4	Tanguy Samedi	25 – 18 July 1992	1.80 m (5 ft 11 in)
PG	5	Lawrence Nganafio	20 – 23 October 1996
PG	6	Michael Mokongo	31 – 11 July 1986		free agent
G/F	7	William Kossangue-Toro	31 – 9 May 1986	1.98 m (6 ft 6 in)	Stade de Vanves	(France)
F/C	8	Johan Grebongo	23 – 18 January 1994	2.04 m (6 ft 8 in)	AS Saint Maurice Pfastatt	(France)
F	9	Privat Koyamba	20 – 25 August 1997	1.98 m (6 ft 6 in)
F	10	Sydney Pehoua	29 – 13 May 1988	1.95 m (6 ft 5 in)	Besancon Avenir Comtois	(France)
F	11	Eddy Ngoy	20 – 28 January 1997	1.98 m (6 ft 6 in)	ASVEL Basket U21	(France)
G/F	12	Max-Severin Febou	29 – 20 December 1987	1.93 m (6 ft 4 in)
SF	13	Max Kouguere	30 – 12 March 1987	1.98 m (6 ft 6 in)	Olympique Antibes	(France)
F	14	Philippe Djada	23 – 31 March 1994	1.99 m (6 ft 6 in)
F/C	15	Jimmy Djimrabaye	25 – 8 April 1992	2.02 m (6 ft 8 in)	Orléans Loiret Basket	(France)

Head coach

- (Central African Republic) Ulrich Marida

Legend

- Club – describes last
  club before the tournament
- Age – describes age
  on 8 September 2017

=== Morocco ===
Morocco men's national basketball team roster
Players
Coaches

Pos.	No.	Name	Age – Date of birth	Height	Club	Ctr.
F/C	4	Abderrahim Najah	32 – 20 November 1984	1.98 m (6 ft 6 in)	AS Salé (Basketball)	(Morocco)
PG	5	Mustapha Khalfi	37 – 1 January 1980	1.77 m (5 ft 10 in)	AS Salé (Basketball)	(Morocco)
C	6	Soufiane Kourdou	32 – 21 May 1985	2.11 m (6 ft 11 in)	AS Salé (Basketball)	(Morocco)
G/F	7	Zakaria El Masbahi	38 – 29 March 1979	1.92 m (6 ft 4 in)	AS Salé (Basketball)	(Morocco)
G/F	8	Abdelali Lahraichi	24 – 19 July 1993	1.90 m (6 ft 3 in)	Wydad AC	(Morocco)
C	9	Mohamed Aboussalam	21 – 20 August 1996	1.98 m (6 ft 6 in)	Rouen Métropole Basket	(France)
F/C	10	Mohamed Choua	24 – 25 December 1992	2.02 m (6 ft 8 in)	AS Salé (Basketball)	(Morocco)
SG	11	Jihad Benchlikha	25 – 6 January 1992	1.86 m (6 ft 1 in)	ASFAR (basketball)	(Morocco)
F/C	12	John Wilkins	28 – 13 July 1989	2.07 m (6 ft 9 in)	Chabab Rif Al Hoceima	(Morocco)
G/F	13	Adil El Makssoud	31 – 12 December 1985	1.93 m (6 ft 4 in)	Chabab Rif Al Hoceima	(Morocco)
PG	14	Nadim Soufiane	29 – 2 May 1988	1.85 m (6 ft 1 in)
C	15	Reda Rhalimi	35 – 2 February 1982	2.12 m (6 ft 11 in)	Chabab Rif Al Hoceima	(Morocco)

Head coach

- (Morocco) Said El Bouzidi

Assistant coach(es)

- (Morocco) Hamrani Labib

Legend

- Club – describes last
  club before the tournament
- Age – describes age
  on 8 September 2017

=== Uganda ===
Uganda men's national basketball team roster
Players
Coaches

Pos.	No.	Name	Age – Date of birth	Height	Club
G	4	Syrus Kiviiri	29 – March 22, 1988		Pemba Warriors	(Uganda)
PG	5	Jimmy Enabu	29 – April 17, 1988	6 ft 2 in (1.88 m)	City Oilers	(Uganda)
G/F	6	Robinson Opong	28 – May 10, 1989	6 ft 3 in (1.91 m)	Free agent
PF	7	James Okello	27 – January 26, 1990	6 ft 5 in (1.96 m)	City Oilers	(Uganda)
PG	8	Benjamin Komakech	31 – April 28, 1986	6 ft 2 in (1.88 m)	City Oilers	(Uganda)
F	9	Jonathan Egau	24 – March 2, 1993	6 ft 3 in (1.91 m)	UCU Canons	(Uganda)
G	10	Jonah Otim	23 – January 10, 1994	6 ft 4 in (1.93 m)	City Oilers	(Uganda)
F/C	11	Samuel Kalwanyi	22 – May 20, 1995	6 ft 7 in (2.01 m)	Wayland Baptist Pioneers	(United States)
SF	12	Stephen Omony (C)	37 – March 23, 1980	6 ft 5 in (1.96 m)	City Oilers	(Uganda)
C	13	A'Darius Pegues	29 – March 21, 1988	6 ft 10 in (2.08 m)	Pioneros de Los Mochis	(Mexico)
F	14	Joseph Ikong	31 – September 28, 1985	6 ft 4 in (1.93 m)	Tiger Head Power	(Uganda)
PF	15	Stanley Ocitti	37 – May 28, 1980	6 ft 8 in (2.03 m)	City Oilers	(Uganda)

Head coach

- (United States) George Galanopoulous

Assistant coach(es)

- (Uganda) Mandy Juruni

Legend

- Club – describes last
  club before the tournament
- Age – describes age
  on 8 September 2017

== Group C ==
=== Guinea ===
Guinea men's national basketball team roster
Players
Coaches

Pos.	No.	Name	Age – Date of birth	Height	Club	Ctr.
G	4	Malick Kone	25 – 12 December 1991	1.95 m (6 ft 5 in)	Rutgers Scarlet Knights men's basketball	(United States)
G	5	Abdoulaye Sy	22 – 14 April 1995	1.98 m (6 ft 6 in)	Stade Marseillais UC	(France)
G	6	Yamoussa Kolontin Camara	21 – 5 December 1995	1.98 m (6 ft 6 in)	LPRC Oilers
F	7	Mohamed Beka Youla	29 – 17 September 1987	2.02 m (6 ft 8 in)
PG	8	Yacouba Sylla	28 – 28 May 1989	1.85 m (6 ft 1 in)	BBC Nyon	(Switzerland)
PF	9	Mohamed Souare	25 – 12 July 1992	1.98 m (6 ft 6 in)	Meyrin Basket Geneve	(Switzerland)
SG	10	Cedric Mansare	31 – 18 October 1985	1.98 m (6 ft 6 in)	Feurs Enfants du Forez	(France)
F	11	Ismael Conde	25 – 7 May 1992	2.01 m (6 ft 7 in)
PF	12	Cheick Sekou Conde	25 – 20 June 1992	2.04 m (6 ft 8 in)	CB Morón	(Spain)
C	13	Alfa Ntiallo	24 – 13 October 1992	2.10 m (6 ft 11 in)	Union Kavala B.C.	(Greece)
PF	14	Daouda Vinson Conde	25 – 10 June 1992	2.10 m (6 ft 11 in)
PF	15	Bachir Bella Diallo	24 – 3 May 1993	1.95 m (6 ft 5 in)

Head coach

- (Guinea) Ousmane Tafsir Camara

Assistant coaches

- (Guinea) Ansoumane Toure

Legend

- Club – describes last
  club before the tournament
- Age – describes age
  on 9 September 2017

=== Rwanda ===
Rwanda men's national basketball team roster
Players
Coaches

Pos.	No.	Name	Age – Date of birth	Height	Club
F	4	Patjo Twagirayezu	23 – 5 July 1994	1.98 m (6 ft 6 in)	Covenant Scots	(United States)
PG	5	Sedard Sagamba	27 – 1 January 1990	1.88 m (6 ft 2 in)	Patriots BBC	(Rwanda)
G/F	6	Olivier Shyaka	22 – 14 August 1995	1.97 m (6 ft 6 in)	Espoir BBC	(Rwanda)
F	7	Adonis Rwabigwi	22 – 9 June 1995	2.03 m (6 ft 8 in)	Texas–Rio Grande Valley Vaqueros men's basketball	(United States)
PG	8	Aristide Mugabe	29 – 11 February 1988	1.83 m (6 ft 0 in)	Espoir BBC	(Rwanda)
F	9	Dan Manzi	21 – 2 October 1995	2.04 m (6 ft 8 in)	Tampa Bay Christian Academy	(United States)
G/F	10	Hamza Ruhezamihigo	32 – 27 March 1985	1.93 m (6 ft 4 in)	Basketball Sun Youth	(Canada)
SF	11	Steven Hagumintwari	24 – 10 January 1993	1.98 m (6 ft 6 in)	IPRC-Kigali	(Rwanda)
G	12	Kenneth Gasana	32 – 9 November 1984	1.95 m (6 ft 5 in)	Texas Fuel	(United States)
G	13	Elie Kaje	22 – 17 March 1995	1.95 m (6 ft 5 in)	Espoir BBC	(Rwanda)
C	14	Kami Kabangu	33 – 2 July 1984	2.03 m (6 ft 8 in)	Rwanda Energy Group (REG)	(Rwanda)
SG	15	Walter Nkurunziza	20 – 25 December 1996	1.96 m (6 ft 5 in)	Patriots BBC	(Rwanda)

Head coach

- (Rwanda) Moise Mutokambali

Legend

- Club – describes last
  club before the tournament
- Age – describes age
  on 8 September 2017

== Group D ==
=== Senegal ===
Senegal men's national basketball team roster
Players
Coaches

Pos.	No.	Name	Age – Date of birth	Height	Club	Ctr.
F	1	Maurice Ndour	25 – 18 June 1992	2.06 m (6 ft 9 in)	New York Knicks	(United States)
G/F	2	Djibril Thiam	31 – 6 July 1986	2.08 m (6 ft 10 in)	[[Al-Fateh]]	(Saudi Arabia)
PG	4	Thierno Niang	27 – 8 March 1990	1.85 m (6 ft 1 in)	CB Agustinos Eras	(Spain)

Head coach

- (Spain) Porfirio Fisac

Assistant coaches

- (Senegal) Dame Diouf

Legend

- Club – describes last
  club before the tournament
- Age – describes age
  on 9 September 2017

=== Mozambique ===
Mozambique men's national basketball team roster
Players
Coaches

Pos.	No.	Name	Age – Date of birth	Height	Club	Ctr.
F	4	Hugo Nyvu Mario Martins	22 – 12 March 1995	1.92 m (6 ft 4 in)	Maxaquene	(Mozambique)
G	5	Baggio Lourenço Chimonzo	26 – 13 December 1990	1.79 m (5 ft 10 in)	Clube de Desportos da Costa do Sol	(Mozambique)
F	6	David Jordao Canivete	28 – 9 August 1989	1.93 m (6 ft 4 in)	Desportivo Maputo	(Mozambique)
SF	7	Ermelindo Orlando Novela	25 – 20 December 1991	1.85 m (6 ft 1 in)	Ferroviario Maputo B.C.	(Mozambique)
SG	8	Afonso Machave	25 – 26 June 1992	1.88 m (6 ft 2 in)		(Mozambique)
C	9	Helton Sergio Ubisse	22 – 31 January 1995	2.00 m (6 ft 7 in)	Ferroviario Maputo B.C.	(Mozambique)
SG	10	Francisco Machaia Sansao Macaringue	31 – 14 June 1986	1.83 m (6 ft 0 in)	Ferroviario Maputo B.C.	(Mozambique)
PF	11	Custodio Anão Muchate	35 – 6 May 1982	1.98 m (6 ft 6 in)	Ferroviario Maputo B.C.	(Mozambique)
PF	12	Octàvio Gregorio Magoliço	32 – 4 October 1984	1.98 m (6 ft 6 in)	Ferroviario Beira	(Mozambique)
F	13	Milton Cesar Ilidio Caifaz	25 – 16 June 1992	1.98 m (6 ft 6 in)	Imortal B.C.	(Portugal)
C	14	Inelcio Carlos Joaquim Chire	26 – 1 June 1991	2.01 m (6 ft 7 in)		(Mozambique)
G	15	Ronaldo Geneto	30 – 10 August 1987	1.85 m (6 ft 1 in)	Desportivo Maputo	(Mozambique)

Head coach

- (Mozambique) Joseba Martin

Assistant coaches

- (Mozambique) Cesar Mujui

Legend

- Club – describes last
  club before the tournament
- Age – describes age
  on 9 September 2017

=== Egypt ===
Egypt men's national basketball team roster
Players
Coaches

Pos.	No.	Name	Age – Date of birth	Height	Club
G	5	Amr Gendy	26 – 14 June 1991	1.93 m (6 ft 4 in)	Gezira	(Egypt)
G	6	Ramy Gunady (C)	35 – 20 December 1981	1.85 m (6 ft 1 in)	Gezira	(Egypt)
F	7	Ahmed Mohamed	22 – 24 January 1995	2.02 m (6 ft 8 in)	Al Ahly	(Egypt)
G	9	Ibrahim El-Gammal	29 – 23 March 1988	1.91 m (6 ft 3 in)	Al Ahly	(Egypt)
G	10	Mouhanad El-Sabagh	29 – 23 April 1988	1.86 m (6 ft 1 in)	Al Ahly	(Egypt)
C	11	Moustafa Elmekawi	22 – 22 October 1994	2.04 m (6 ft 8 in)	Zamalek	(Egypt)
F	12	Youssef Shousha	24 – 9 June 1993	1.90 m (6 ft 3 in)	Sporting	(Egypt)
F	14	Rami Ibrahim	29 – 6 February 1988	2.04 m (6 ft 8 in)	Zamalek	(Egypt)
G	20	Motaz Okasha	27 – 14 February 1990	1.85 m (6 ft 1 in)	Zamalek	(Egypt)
G	44	Romeh ElSadani	23 – 30 May 1994	1.85 m (6 ft 1 in)	Gezira	(Egypt)
C	66	Haytham Kamal	29 – 17 November 1987	2.07 m (6 ft 9 in)	Sporting	(Egypt)
F	95	Ahmed Bakr	22 – 1 August 1995	1.90 m (6 ft 3 in)	Gezira	(Egypt)

Head coach

- (Egypt) Amr Aboul Kheir

Assistant coach(es)

- (Egypt) Sabry Saleh

Legend

- Club – describes last
  club before the tournament
- Age – describes age
  on 9 September 2017

=== South Africa ===
South Africa men's national basketball team roster
Players
Coaches

Pos.	No.	Name	Age – Date of birth	Height	Club	Ctr.
C	0	Reece Prinsloo	26 – 16 April 1991	2.03 m (6 ft 8 in)	Soweto Panthers	(South Africa)
G	4	Thabo Sithole	22 – 10 June 1995	1.90 m (6 ft 3 in)	BC Žalgiris-2	(Lithuania)
G	7	Lebesa Selepe	26 – 13 March 1991	1.90 m (6 ft 3 in)	Soweto Panthers	(South Africa)
F	9	Kagiso Ngoetjana	27 – 15 November 1989	1.98 m (6 ft 6 in)	Egoli Magic	(South Africa)
G/F	10	Shane Marhanele	35 – 28 August 1982	1.98 m (6 ft 6 in)	Limpopo Pride	(South Africa)
G/F	11	Sakhile Sithole	27 – 11 March 1990	1.92 m (6 ft 4 in)	Mpumalanga Rhinos	(South Africa)
G	12	Neo Mothiba	35 – 21 March 1982	2.00 m (6 ft 7 in)	Egoli Magic	(South Africa)
F	13	Jonathan Van der Bijl	25 – 6 February 1992	2.02 m (6 ft 8 in)	Egoli Magic	(South Africa)
F	14	Tsakani Ngombeni	33 – 16 December 1983	1.99 m (6 ft 6 in)	Duzi Royals	(South Africa)
G	15	Lehlogonolo Tholo	24 – 12 November 1992	1.83 m (6 ft 0 in)	Egoli Magic	(South Africa)
C	21	Christopher Gabriel	28 – 19 December 1988	2.11 m (6 ft 11 in)	Team FOG Næstved	(Denmark)
F	23	Pieter Prinsloo	25 – 7 January 1992	2.08 m (6 ft 10 in)	Lagos City Stars	(Nigeria)

Head coach

- Craig Gilchrist

Assistant coach(es)

- Clemen Andre Lucas Kock
- Sergei Eugenevich Paly

Legend

- Club – describes last
  club before the tournament
- Age – describes age
  on 8 September 2017
