= 2022–23 Cape Town Tigers season =

Cape Town Tigers
2022–23 season
- BNL champions
- President: Raphael Edwards
- Head coach: Florsheim Ngwenya (BNL); Rasheed Hazzard (BAL)
- BNL: 1st in Group A
- Playoffs: Champions
- BAL: 3rd in Nile Conference
- Playoffs: Quarter-finalist

The 2022–23 season of the Cape Town Tigers was the 3rd season of the South African basketball team. The Tigers played in the Basketball Africa League (BAL) for a second straight season, following their win in the Road to BAL's East Division.

In the 2023 BAL season, the Tigers were coached by former New York Knicks assistant coach Rasheed Hazzard. They were eliminated in the quarter-finals by Stade Malien, their second consecutive year in which they were eliminated in this round.

Domestically, the Tigers were coached by Florsheim Ngwenya and made their debut in the Basketball National League (BNL), South Africa's sole professional league. They went undefeated and won the semifinal and final by wide margins to be crowned South African champions for the third time.

== Players ==
=== BAL roster (April – May) ===
The following Tigers roster played during the 2023 BAL season. Josh Hall played for the Tigers in the Nile Conference.

Cape Town Tigers roster
Players
Coaches

Pos.	No.	Nat.	Name	Ht.	Age
G	00	(United States)	Wade, Zaire (I)	1.91 m (6 ft 3 in)	23 – 4 February 2002
G/F	1	(Central African Republic)	Ganapamo, Evans (I)	2.01 m (6 ft 7 in)	30 – 19 August 1994
G	2	(Nigeria)	Gbinije, Michael (I)	2.01 m (6 ft 7 in)	32 – 5 June 1992
F	5	(South Africa)	Hall, Josh	2.06 m (6 ft 9 in)	24 – 8 October 2000
C	7	(South Africa)	Mthembu, Somusa	2.08 m (6 ft 10 in)	32 – 26 March 1992
CG	10	(South Africa)	Selepe, Lebesa	1.93 m (6 ft 4 in)	34 – 13 March 1991
G/F	11	(South Africa)	Mofokeng, Lebo	1.94 m (6 ft 4 in)	32 – 24 April 1992
G	12	(South Africa)	Whitbread, Dylan	1.91 m (6 ft 3 in)	30 – 27 October 1994
PF	14	(South Africa)	Sibanyoni, Nkosinathi	2.06 m (6 ft 9 in)	26 – 24 May 1998
G	15	(Democratic Republic of the Congo)	Musongela, Parby (E)		19 – 15 December 2005
G	23	(South Africa)	Cele, Samkelo	1.98 m (6 ft 6 in)	27 – 28 December 1997
C	34	(South Africa)	Reid, Liam	2.06 m (6 ft 9 in)	27 – 10 March 1998
C	41	(South Africa)	Prinsloo, Pieter (C)	2.08 m (6 ft 10 in)	33 – 7 January 1992
F	45	(United States)	Smith Jr., Marvin (I)	2.01 m (6 ft 7 in)	31 – 11 July 1993

Head coach

- (United States) Rasheed Hazzard

Assistant coach(es)

- (South Africa) Vincent Ntunja
- (South Africa) Mlungisi Ngwenya

Legend

- (C) Team captain
- Injured

- Roster
Updated: September 25, 2023

=== BNL roster (June – July) ===
The following Tigers roster played in the 2023 BNL season between June and July 2023.

No	Player
0	Dumisani Gebashe
3	Dylan Whitbread
10	Lebesa Selepe
11	Lebohang Mofokeng
14	Nkosinathi Sibanyoni
23	Akeem Springs
24	Sita Conteh
25	Pieter Prinsloo
34	Somusa Mthembu
41	Braydon Wooley
44	Gloire Kabange
45	Rabbi Belolo
HC	Florsheim Ngwenya

== Competitions ==
=== Overview ===
Competition	First match	Last match	Starting round	Final position	Record							
Competition	First match	Last match	Starting round	Final position	Pld	W	D	L	PF	PA	PD	Win %
BNL	4 June 2023	30 July 2023	Group phase	Winners	5	5	0	0	643	373	+270	100.00
Road to BAL	22 November 2022	27 November 2022	Elite 16	Winners	5	4	0	1	386	331	+55	80.00
BAL	27 April 2023	21 May 2023	Nile Conference	Quarter-finalist	6	2	0	4	423	476	−53	33.33
Total					16	11	0	5	1,452	1,180	+272	68.75

Last updated: complete
Source: Competitions

=== Basketball National League ===
All games were played at the Mandeville Indoor Hall in Johannesburg.

==== Group phase ====
Gameday	Date	Opponents	Result	Record
1	4 June 2023	Mpumalanga Rhinos	W 65–83	1–0
2	11 June 2023	Egoli Magic	W 76–47	2–0
3	25 June 2023	Western Cape Mountaineers	W 106–46	3–0
4	9 July 2023	Limpopo Pride	W 97–51	4–0
5	8 December	Free State Warriors	W 36–107	5–0

==== Final round ====
July 23, 2023 Semi-final	Kwa-Zulu Marlins	68–89	Cape Town Tigers	Mandeville Indoor Hall, Johannesburg
4:00 pm	Scoring by quarter: 15–22, 22–23, 15–22, 16–22
	Pts: Bena Kabuya 18; Rebs: Sifiso Gininda, Storm Gilchrist 9 Asts: Storm Gilchrist 3	Boxscore	Pts: Sita Conteh 27; Rebs: Nkosinathi Sibanyoni, Pieter Prinsloo 10; Asts: Lebesa Selepe 4

July 30, 2023 Final	Tshwane Suns	60–85	Cape Town Tigers	Mandeville Indoor Hall, Johannesburg
1:00 pm	Scoring by quarter: 15–20, 4–22, 17–26, 24–17
	Pts: Gleen Akoulou 18; Rebs: Marcus Mokwena 10; Asts: Kagiso Ngoetjana, Briarley Klaassen 2	Boxscore	Pts: Akeem Springs 24; Rebs: Nkosinathi Sibanyoni 19; Asts: Sita Conteh 8

=== Road to BAL ===
==== Elite 16 ====
22 November	Cape Town Tigers (South Africa)	85–60	NBA Academy Africa	Ellis Park Arena, Johannesburg
18:00	Scoring by quarter: 14–10, 28–19, 29–17, 14–14
	Pts: Gbinije 22; Rebs: Gbinije 7 Asts: Deing 7	Report	Pts: Darlan 20; Rebs: Chinyelu 12; Asts: Darlan 5

23 November	KPA (Kenya)	72–96	(South Africa) Cape Town Tigers	Ellis Park Arena, Johannesburg
18:00	Scoring by quarter: 26–19, 19–22, 23–34, 11–21
	Pts: Williams 24; Rebs: Williams 8 Asts: Ogol, Khaemba 3	Report	Pts: Ganapamo 20; Rebs: Putney 9 Asts: Ganapamo, Deing 5

24 November	Cape Town Tigers (South Africa)	49–59	(Burundi) Urunani	Ellis Park Arena, Johannesburg
18:00	Scoring by quarter: 12–25, 13–8, 9–19, 15–7
	Pts: Ganapamo 14; Rebs: Sibanyoni 10; Asts: Three players 2	Report	Pts: Filer 28; Rebs: Parker-Rivera 11; Asts: Nijimbere, Baru 3

==== Final round ====
26 November	City Oilers (Uganda)	69–75	(South Africa) Cape Town Tigers	Ellis Park Arena, Johannesburg
19:00 (GMT+2)	Scoring by quarter: 7–14, 19–16, 26–21, 17–24
	Pts: Jones 40	Report

27 November	Ferroviário da Beira (Mozambique)	71–81	(South Africa) Cape Town Tigers	Ellis Park Arena, Johannesburg
19:00 (GMT+2)	Scoring by quarter: 11–27, 20–17, 25–19, 15–18
	Pts: Ubisse 18; Rebs: Ubisse, Murray 8 Asts: Malale 4	Report	Pts: Ganapamo 34; Rebs: Putney 9 Asts: Putney 7

=== Basketball Africa League ===
==== Nile Conference ====
27 April 2023	SLAC (Guinea)	68–75	(South Africa) Cape Town Tigers	Hassan Moustafa Sports Hall, 6th of October
17:00	Scoring by quarter: 22–16, 17–18, 8–13, 21–23
	Pts: Miller Jr. 20; Rebs: Conde, Miller Jr. 12; Asts: Barefield, Nwabuzor 3	RealGM Report	Pts: Ganapamo, Hall 15; Rebs: Hall 8 Asts: Wade 5	Attendance: 270

30 April 2023	Petro de Luanda (Angola)	87–48	(South Africa) Cape Town Tigers	Hassan Moustafa Sports Hall, 6th of October
20:30	Scoring by quarter: 28–12, 20–12, 26–9, 13–15
	Pts: Gonçalves 15; Rebs: Gonçalves 9 Asts: Four players 4	Livestats	Pts: Hall 14; Rebs: Gbinije 8 Asts: Hall, Wade 3	Attendance: 883; Referees: Tyler Ricks, Mbaye Seye, Jean Sauveur Ruhamiriza

2 May 2023	Cape Town Tigers (South Africa)	75–91	(Egypt) Al Ahly	Hassan Moustafa Sports Hall, 6th of October
20:30	Scoring by quarter: 20–30, 22–16, 14–18, 19–17
	Pts: Ganapamo 26; Rebs: Cele 6 Asts: Ganapamo, Gbinije 5	BAL Report	Pts: Omot 28; Rebs: Omot 5 Asts: Amin 8	Attendance: 2,050; Referees: Ian McClenny, Jean Sauveur Ruhamiriza, Hassan Kamate

3 May 2023	Ferroviário da Beira (Mozambique)	82–76	(South Africa) Cape Town Tigers	Hassan Moustafa Sports Hall, 6th of October
20:30	Scoring by quarter: 23–22, 16–17, 17–26, 26–11
	Pts: Young 26; Rebs: Sidibe 17; Asts: Perry 9	BAL Report	Pts: Gbinije 20; Rebs: Gbinije 7 Asts: Gbinije 6	Attendance: 672; Referees: Julian Scott, Mahamadou Diallo, Aya Ahmed

6 May 2023	Cape Town Tigers (South Africa)	80–70	(Uganda) City Oilers	Hassan Moustafa Sports Hall, 6th of October
16:00	Scoring by quarter: 20–17, 17–20, 26–19, 17–14
	Pts: Cele 28; Rebs: Gbinije, Cele 8 Asts: Prinsloo 6	Livestats	Pts: Jones 27; Rebs: Jones, Justice Jr. 8 Asts: Dribela, Justice Jr. 4	Attendance: 696; Referees: Tyler Mirkovich, Wael Ibrahim Mostafa, Hassan Kamate

==== Playoffs ====
21 May 2023 Quarterfinal	Stade Malien (Mali)	78–69	(South Africa) Cape Town Tigers	BK Arena, Kigali
19:00	Scoring by quarter: 31–15, 17–15, 16–22, 14–17
	Pts: Diarra, Wilkins 18; Rebs: Diarra 13; Asts: Foster 7	Report	Pts: Prinsloo 19; Rebs: Gbinije 13; Asts: Gbinije 5	Attendance: 3,632; Referees: Hortencia Sanchez-Carrizales, Jean Sauveur Ruhamiriza, Leslie Cherubin

== Player statistics ==
Legend
GP	Games played	GS	Games started	MPG	Minutes per game
FG%	Field-goal percentage	3P%	3-point field-goal percentage	FT%	Free-throw percentage
RPG	Rebounds per game	APG	Assists per game	SPG	Steals per game
BPG	Blocks per game	PPG	Points per game

After all games.

Cape Town Tigers statistics
Player	GP	MPG	FG%	3FG%	FT%	RPG	APG	SPG	BPG	PPG
Marvin Smith^{≠}	1	37.9	.300	.375	1.000	4.0	1.0	1.0	0.0	17.0
Evans Ganapamo	4	34.6	.400	.083	.750	4.5	1.8	1.8	0.0	15.8
Michael Gbinije	6	34.8	.356	.300	.783	7.8	3.7	1.3	0.5	13.7
Samkelo Cele	6	30.6	.478	.235	.524	5.3	2.3	2.0	0.2	13.5
Josh Hall^{~}	3	29.0	.389	.222	.444	6.0	1.3	0.3	0.0	12.7
Pieter Prinsloo	6	30.1	.357	.294	.810	4.5	2.2	0.3	1.0	11.2
Zaire Wade	4	29.7	.429	.250	.909	3.8	4.3	0.8	0.5	9.3
Parby Musongela	2	18.1	.400	.333	1.000	4.5	0.5	1.5	0.0	5.5
Nkosinathi Sibanyoni	6	9.4	.294	.000	.750	1.8	0.0	0.2	0.2	2.2
Lebesa Selepe	5	16.2	.200	.167	.167	2.4	1.0	1.0	0.0	1.8
Lebohang Mofokeng	3	10.4	.200	.000	.500	2.0	0.7	0.3	0.0	1.3
Skumbuzo Mthembu	2	6.4	.000	.000	.500	0.5	0.0	0.0	0.5	0.5
Dylan Whitbread	4	6.8	.000	.000	.000	1.0	0.3	0.0	0.0	0.0

^{≠}Acquired during the season
^{~}Waived during the season
