= 2024–25 MBB Basketball season =

The 2024–25 MBB Basketball season was the debut season of MBB Basketball in the Basketball Africa League (BAL), as it received a wild card for the competition.

Having won the BSA-organised National Championship title, the team was eligible for the 2025 BAL qualification, where they will make their debut in the Elite 16 phase, becoming the third South African team in the Road to BAL, behind the Jozi Nuggets and the Cape Town Tigers.

On January 12, 2025, MBB announced on Instagram that they would play in the 2025 season of the Basketball Africa League (BAL). On February 4, 2025, MBB announced Sam Vincent as their new head coach. Their participation was confirmed on 28 February 2025. On May 20, 2025, MBB won its first-ever BAL game, defeating Nairobi City Thunder. MBB was eliminated in the final round as they finished with a 3–3 record and did not have a high enough point differential to secure a wild card as third placed team.

== Roster ==
=== BAL roster ===
Note: Flags indicate national team eligibility at FIBA-sanctioned events. Players may hold other non-FIBA nationalities not displayed.

2025 MBB roster
Players
Coaches

Pos.	No.	Nat.	Name	Ht.	Age
PG	1	(Zimbabwe)	Pfachi, Dyvonne (I)	1.89 m (6 ft 2 in)	30 – 9 February 1995
CG	2	(South Africa)	Dim, Nino	1.97 m (6 ft 6 in)	24 – 6 November 2000
SG	5	(Uganda)	Opong, Robinson (I)	1.91 m (6 ft 3 in)	36 – 10 May 1989
SF	6	(United States)	Lenard, Teafale (I)	2.03 m (6 ft 8 in)	22 – 21 July 2002
G/F	10	(South Africa)	Selepe, Lebesa	1.90 m (6 ft 3 in)	34 – 13 March 1991
SF	12	(South Africa)	Mothiba, Neo	2.00 m (6 ft 7 in)	43 – 21 March 1982
F	13	(The Gambia)	Thielemans, Omar (I)	2.03 m (6 ft 8 in)	25 – 23 September 1999
PF/C	14	(South Africa)	Sibanyoni, Nkosinathi	2.08 m (6 ft 10 in)	27 – 24 May 1998
SF	15	(Senegal)	Camara, Mouhamed (E)	2.05 m (6 ft 9 in)	20 – 1 April 2005
C	23	(South Africa)	Mokwena, Marcus	1.98 m (6 ft 6 in)	33 – 4 December 1991
PF	41	(South Africa)	Prinsloo, Pieter	2.08 m (6 ft 10 in)	33 – 7 January 1992
PG	45	(United States)	Mooring, Jovan (I)	1.88 m (6 ft 2 in)	30 – 14 December 1994
C	50	(South Africa)	Craig, David	2.18 m (7 ft 2 in)	21 – 13 July 2003

Head coach

- (United States) Sam Vincent

Assistant coach(es)

- (United States) Dean Murray
- (South Africa) Lindokuhle Sibankulu

Legend

- (C) Team captain
- (I) Import player
- Injured

- Roster
Updated: May 21, 2025

== Competitions ==
=== Road to BAL ===
Win Loss Fixtures

==== Elite 16 ====
28 November 2024 1	MBB (South Africa)	59–102	(Kenya) Nairobi City Thunder	Nairobi, Kenya
20:00	Scoring by quarter: 19–17, 18–31, 17–22, 5–32
	Pts: Mothiba 14; Rebs: Mokwena 12; Asts: Pfachi 6	Boxscore	Pts: Harouna 18; Rebs: Koranga 8 Asts: Iroegbu 7	Arena: Kasarani Indoor Arena; Attendance: 2,000; Referees: Michel Djeugoue (CMR), Amr Zahed (EGY), Shabani Shabani (TAN)

29 November 2024 2	Bravehearts (Malawi)	61–90	(South Africa) MBB	Nairobi, Kenya
18:30	Scoring by quarter: 22–24, 17–20, 9–28, 13–18
	Pts: Banda, Lele 10; Rebs: Banda 12; Asts: Limbe 3		Pts: Pfachi 32; Rebs: Mothiba 10; Asts: Pfachi 6	Arena: Kasarani Indoor Arena; Attendance: 200; Referees: Didier Gaga (RWA), Michel Djeugoue (CMR), David João Domingos (ANG)

30 November 2024 3	MBB (South Africa)	58–63	(Cape Verde) Kriol Star	Nairobi, Kenya
17:00	Scoring by quarter: 15–17, 11–21, 13–7, 19–18
	Pts: Mothiba 20; Rebs: Mokwena 15; Asts: Pfachi 4	Boxscore	Pts: McGlynn 20; Rebs: Mendes 13; Asts: Three players 4	Arena: Kasarani Indoor Arena; Attendance: 300; Referees: Walelign Fikadu Gebeto (ETH), Mahamadou Diallo (MLI), Jerome Denis (MRI)

=== Basketball Africa League ===
MBB received a wild card for the BAL, and was allocated in the Nile Conference, which was played in Kigali.

==== Nile Conference ====
Pos	Team	Pld	W	L	PF	PA	PD	PCT	Qualification
1	(Libya) Al Ahli Tripoli	6	6	0	604	498	+106	1.000	Advance to playoffs
2	(Rwanda) APR	6	3	3	530	508	+22	.500	Advance to playoffs
3	(South Africa) MBB	6	2	4	476	539	−63	.333	
4	(Kenya) Nairobi City Thunder	6	1	5	474	539	−65	.167	

Updated to match(es) played on 2025-05-25. Source: BAL
Rules for classification: Tiebreakers

17 May 2025 1	MBB (South Africa)	77–87	(Libya) Al Ahli Tripoli	Kigali, Rwanda
14:30	Scoring by quarter: 15–20, 18–25, 17–19, 27–23
	Pts: Mooring 26; Rebs: Three players 7 Asts: Mooring, Lenard 3	Boxscore	Pts: Boissy 28; Rebs: Sadi 13; Asts: Adams, Badrush 5	Arena: BK Arena; Attendance: 3,557; Referees: Kenneth Gardner, Hassane Kamate, Asmae Benkhadra

18 May 2025 2	MBB (South Africa)	81–103	(Rwanda) APR	Kigali, Rwanda
17:30	Scoring by quarter: 26–23, 21–22, 12–28, 22–30
	Pts: Lenard 20; Rebs: Sibanyoni 7 Asts: Mooring 6	Boxscore	Pts: Ndoye 25; Rebs: Diarra 14; Asts: Habimana 8	Arena: BK Arena; Attendance: 4,946; Referees: Maripier Malo, Gina Catanzariti, Mahamadou Diallo

20 May 2025 3	Nairobi City Thunder (Kenya)	74–75	(South Africa) MBB	Kigali, Rwanda
16:00	Scoring by quarter: 15–22, 18–10, 27–18, 14–25
	Pts: Ganapamo 21; Rebs: Adera 7 Asts: Adera 5	Boxscore	Pts: Prinsloo 30; Rebs: Prinsloo 11; Asts: Lenard, Mooring 5	Arena: BK Arena; Attendance: 3,279; Referees: Cameron Garber, Jean Sauveur Ruhamiriza, Mahamadou Diallo

22 May 2025 4	APR (Rwanda)	88–94	(South Africa) MBB	Kigali, Rwanda
19:00	Scoring by quarter: 15–16, 24–22, 19–29, 30–27
	Pts: Noel 23; Rebs: Ndoye 10; Asts: Habimana 6	Boxscore	Pts: Mooring 29; Rebs: Craig 10; Asts: Mooring 5	Arena: BK Arena; Attendance: 5,337; Referees: Gina Catanzariti, Claudio Eiuba, Asmae Benkhadra

24 May 2025 5	MBB (South Africa)	76–85	(Kenya) Nairobi City Thunder	Kigali, Rwanda
14:30	Scoring by quarter: 24–20, 15–21, 15–14, 22–30
	Pts: Lenard 39; Rebs: Lenard, Sibanyoni 9 Asts: Sibanyoni 2	Boxscore	Pts: Odero 23; Rebs: Adera 14; Asts: Iroegbu 7	Arena: BK Arena; Attendance: 3,251; Referees: Gina Catanzariti, Amir Taboubi, Hassane Kamate

25 May 2025 6	Al Ahli Tripoli (Libya)	102–73	(South Africa) MBB	Kigali, Rwanda
14:30	Scoring by quarter: 23–16, 19–18, 27–14, 33–25
	Pts: Adams 28; Rebs: Marei 10; Asts: Badrush 5	Boxscore	Pts: Lenard 18; Rebs: Lenard 11; Asts: Mooring 5	Arena: BK Arena; Attendance: 3,632; Referees: Jean Sauveur Ruhamiriza, Silver Houngbedji, Amir Taboubi
