= 2023 BNL season =

- League: Basketball National League
- Sport: Basketball
- Hosts: Mandeville Indoor Hall, Johannesburg
- Finals champions: Cape Town Tigers (1st title)
- Runners-up: Tshwane Suns

Seasons
- ← 2022 2024 →

The 2023 BNL season was the 10th season of the Basketball National League (BNL), the top-flight basketball league in South Africa. The season began on 6 May 2023 and ended with the championship game on 30 July 2023. All fixtures were played in the Mandeville Indoor Hall in Johannesburg.

The league consisted of 12 teams, which were divided in two groups of six teams each. The Florsheim Ngwenya-led Cape Town Tigers made their BNL debut and won their first-ever league championship. As national champions, the Tigers qualified for the 2024 BAL qualification.

== Regular season ==
=== Group A ===
Pos	Team	Pld	W	L	GF	GA	GD	Pts	Qualification	TS	KZM	SP	NCZ	NWE	ECW
1	Tshwane Suns	5	5	0	448	290	+158	10	Advance to semi-finals	—				96–43	104–71
2	KwaZulu Marlins	5	4	1	431	300	+131	9	Advance to semi-finals	72–77	—	74–62			105–59
3	Soweto Panthers	5	3	2	391	324	+67	8		59–73		—	83–63	88–46	
4	Northern Cape Zebras	5	2	3	311	413	−102	7		45–98	57–104		—	60–58	
5	North West Eagles	5	1	4	281	404	−123	6			45–76			—	
6	Eastern Cape Windbreakers	5	0	5	352	483	−131	5				68–99	70–86	84–89	—

Source: BNL

=== Group B ===
Pos	Team	Pld	W	L	GF	GA	GD	Pts	Qualification	CTT	MR	WCM	LP	EM	FSW
1	Cape Town Tigers	5	5	0	469	245	+224	10	Advance to semi-finals	—		106–46	97–51	76–47	
2	Mpumalanga Rhinos	5	3	2	345	354	−9	8	Advance to semi-finals	65–83	—		48–56		87–79
3	Western Cape Mountaineers	5	3	2	340	311	+29	8			68–69	—	69–51		
4	Limpopo Pride	5	2	3	291	323	−32	7					—	65–39	68–70
5	Egoli Magic	5	1	4	252	335	−83	6			68–76	42–70		—	56–48
6	Free State Warriors	5	1	4	276	405	−129	6		36–107					—

Source: BNL

== Playoffs ==
Semi-finals
A1	Tshwane Suns	64
B2	Mpumalanga Rhinos	60
A2	KwaZulu Marlins	68
B1	Cape Town Tigers	89

Final
A1	Tshwane Suns	60
B1	Cape Town Tigers	85

=== Semi-finals ===
July 23, 2023
12:00 pm

Boxscore

Tshwane Suns	64–60	Mpumalanga Rhinos
Scoring by quarter: 9–17, 20–9, 16–13, 19–21
Pts: Emmanuel Shine 24; Rebs: Marcus Mokwena 14; Asts: Briarley Klaassen, Holy Mandungu 3		Pts: Vusi Sibeko 13; Rebs: Ludwig Gerdes 9 Asts: Joshua Tawengwa 5

Mandeville Indoor Hall, Johannesburg

July 23, 2023
4:00 pm

Boxscore

Kwa-Zulu Marlins	68–89	Cape Town Tigers
Scoring by quarter: 15–22, 22–23, 15–22, 16–22
Pts: Bena Kabuya 18; Rebs: Sifiso Gininda, Storm Gilchrist 9 Asts: Storm Gilchrist 3		Pts: Sita Conteh 27; Rebs: Nkosinathi Sibanyoni, Pieter Prinsloo 10; Asts: Lebesa Selepe 4

Mandeville Indoor Hall, Johannesburg

=== Final ===
July 30, 2023
1:00 pm

Boxscore

Tshwane Suns	60–85	Cape Town Tigers
Scoring by quarter: 15–20, 4–22, 17–26, 24–17
Pts: Gleen Akoulou 18; Rebs: Marcus Mokwena 10; Asts: Kagiso Ngoetjana, Briarley Klaassen 2		Pts: Akeem Springs 24; Rebs: Nkosinathi Sibanyoni 19; Asts: Sita Conteh 8

Mandeville Indoor Hall, Johannesburg

== Statistical leaders ==
Category	Player	Team(s)	Statistic
Points per game	Akeem Springs	Cape Town Tigers	23.0
Points per game	Emmanuel Shine	Tshwane Suns	23.0
Rebounds per game	Damien Kasongo	Limpopo Pride	18.0
Assists per game	Lebesa Selepe	Cape Town Tigers	3.7

== Winning roster ==
2023 Cape Town Tigers roster

No	Player
0	Dumisani Gebashe
3	Dylan Whitbread
10	Lebesa Selepe
11	Lebohang Mofokeng
14	Nkosinathi Sibanyoni
23	Akeem Springs
24	Sita Conteh
25	Pieter Prinsloo
34	Somusa Mthembu
41	Braydon Wooley
44	Gloire Kabange
45	Rabbi Belolo
HC	Florsheim Ngwenya
