= Women's Basketball National League =

Women's basketball league in South Africa

- Founded: 2021; 4 years ago
- First season: 2021
- Country: South Africa
- Number of teams: 11
- Current champions: Western Cape Mountaineers (2nd title) (2023)
- Most championships: Western Cape Mountaineers (2 titles)
- CEO: Albert Mokoena
- Website: bnlsa.com

The Women's Basketball National League (WBNL) is the pre-eminent basketball league for women's basketball teams in South Africa. The league was founded in 2021 after the model of the Basketball National League for men's teams. The league consists of 11 teams.

The Egoli Magic won the inaugural 2021 title.

== Teams ==
The following 11 teams play in the 2023 season:

Team	Location
Eastern Cape Windbreakers	Eastern Cape
Egoli Magic	Gauteng
Free State Warriors	Free State
KwaZulu Marlins	Durban, KwaZulu-Natal
Limpopo Pride	Limpopo
Mpumalanga Rhinos	Mpumalanga
Northern Cape Zebras	Northern Cape
North West Eagles	North West
Soweto Panthers	Gauteng
Tshwane Suns	Gauteng
Western Cape Mountaineers	Western Cape

== Champions ==
Season	Champions	Runners-up
2020–21	Egoli Magic	Tshwane Suns
2021	Tshwane Suns	Western Cape Mountaineers
2022	Western Cape Mountaineers	Egoli Magic
2023	Western Cape Mountaineers	Tshwane Suns
