= 2021–22 Cape Town Tigers season =

Cape Town Tigers
2021–22 season
- Owner: Raphael Edwards
- Head coach: Relton Booysen
- South African National Basketball Championship: Champions
- Basketball Africa League: Quarterfinals (eliminated by US Monastir)

The 2021–22 Cape Town Tigers season is the 2nd season in the existence of the Cape Town Tigers. The team played in the BAL qualification and successfully advanced to the 2022 BAL season.

Cape Town began its qualification October 21, 2021 and started its debut season in the BAL on April 10, 2022. The Tigers were led by head coach Relton Booysen.

== Roster ==
Note: Flags indicate national team eligibility at FIBA-sanctioned events. Players may hold other non-FIBA nationalities not displayed.

Cape Town Tigers roster
Players
Coaches

Pos.	No.	Nat.	Name	Ht.	Age
SG	00	(South Africa)	Myburgh, Ben	1.92 m (6 ft 4 in)	28 – 26 October 1997
F	1	(Central African Republic)	Ganapamo, Evans (I)	2.01 m (6 ft 7 in)	32 – 19 August 1994
G	2	(Democratic Republic of the Congo)	Kabongo, Myck (I)	1.90 m (6 ft 3 in)	34 – 12 January 1992
CG	6	(South Africa)	Festile, Nkosinathi	1.75 m (5 ft 9 in)	33 – 15 July 1993
G	10	(South Africa)	Selepe, Lebesa	1.90 m (6 ft 3 in)	35 – 13 March 1991
G	11	(South Africa)	Mofokeng, Lebohang	1.94 m (6 ft 4 in)	34 – 24 July 1992
G/F	12	(South Africa)	Lunnemann, Igor	1.93 m (6 ft 4 in)	25 – 29 May 2001
PF	14	(South Africa)	Sibanyoni, Nkosinathi		28 – 24 May 1998
SG	15	(United States)	Artis, Jamel (I)	2.01 m (6 ft 7 in)	33 – 12 January 1993
F	21	(Senegal)	Diop, Matar (E)	2.03 m (6 ft 8 in)	22 – 15 January 2004
C	23	(United States)	Preston, Billy (I)	2.08 m (6 ft 10 in)	28 – 26 October 1997
SF	24	(United States)	Early, Cleanthony	2.03 m (6 ft 8 in)	35 – 17 April 1991
C	34	(South Africa)	Reid, Liam	2.06 m (6 ft 9 in)	27 – 3 October 1998
C	41	(South Africa)	Prinsloo, Pieter (C)	2.08 m (6 ft 10 in)	34 – 7 January 1992

Head coach

- (South Africa) Relton Booysen

Assistant coach(es)

- (United States) Raphael Edwards
- (South Africa) Vincent Ntunja
- (South Africa) Elvis Ukpong

Legend

- (C) Team captain
- (DC) Dual citizenship
- (I) Import player
- (E): BAL Elevate program player
- Injured

- Roster
Updated: May 9, 2022

=== Transactions ===
==== In ====
No.	Pos.	Nat.	Name	Age	Moving from		Date	Source
2	PG	(Democratic Republic of the Congo)	Myck Kabongo	30	Al-Rayyan	(Qatar)	December 7, 2021	
15	G/F	(United States)	Jamel Artis	29	NorthPort Batang Pier	(Philippines)		
24	SF	(United States)	Cleanthony Early	30	New Taipei CTBC DEA	(Taiwan)	May 4, 2022	

== Overview ==
Competition	First match	Last match	Starting round	Final position	Record							
Competition	First match	Last match	Starting round	Final position	Pld	W	D	L	PF	PA	PD	Win %
South African National Basketball Championship	4 September 2021	5 September 2021	Round 1	Winners	4	4	0	0	0	0	+0	100.00
Road to BAL	21 October 2021	11 December 2021	Group stage	Winners	6	4	0	2	0	0	+0	66.67
Basketball Africa League	22 May 2022	28 May 2022	Group stage	Quarter-finalist	6	2	0	4	0	0	+0	33.33
Total					16	10	0	6	0	0	+0	62.50

Last updated: complete
Source: Competitions

== South African Championship ==
Date Time, TV	Opponent	Result	Record	High points	High rebounds	High assists	Arena City
Group stage
September 4, 2021	vs. Kwa-Duzuka Kings	W 74–44	1–0	–	–	–	Walter Sisulu Hall; Randburg
September 4, 2021	vs. Joby Knightz	W 99-40	2–0	–	–	–	Walter Sisulu Hall; Randburg
September 4, 2021	vs. Jozi Nuggets	W 70–63 (OT)	3–0	–	–	–	Walter Sisulu Hall; Randburg
Final
September 5, 2021	vs. Jozi Nuggets; Final	W 70–64	4–0	–	–	–	Walter Sisulu Hall; Randburg

== Basketball Africa League qualification ==
=== Qualification ===
Date Time, TV	Opponent	Result	Record	High points	High rebounds	High assists	Arena City
First round
October 21, 2022	vs. (Mauritius) Roche-Bois Warriors	W 116–49	1–0	20 – Ganapamo	12 – Tied	8 – Uzoh	Wembley Stadium; Johannesburg
October 22, 2021	vs. (Zambia) Matero Magic	W 83–77	2–0	–	–	–	Wembley Stadium; Johannesburg
October 23, 2021	vs. (Mozambique) Ferroviário da Beira	W 86–85	3–0	25 – Prinsloo	15 – Prinsloo	9 – Uzoh	Wembley Stadium; Johannesburg
Elite 16
December 6, 2021	vs. (Burundi) New Star	L 71–83	3–1	20 – Preston	12 – Preston	5 – Ganapamo	Wembley Stadium; Johannesburg
December 8, 2021	vs. (Zambia) Matero Magic	W 79–63	4–1	20 – Preston	10 – Prinsloo	4 – Kabongo	Wembley Stadium; Johannesburg
December 10, 2021	vs. (Mozambique) Ferroviário da Beira; Semifinal	L 75–77	4–2	17 – Ganapamo	10 – Preston	6 – Tied	Wembley Stadium; Johannesburg
December 11, 2021	vs. (Burundi) New Star; Final	Cancelled due to COVID-19 infections in the opponent's team					Wembley Stadium; Johannesburg

== Basketball Africa League ==
=== Standings ===
Pos	Team	Pld	W	L	PF	PA	PD	PCT	Qualification
1	(Egypt) Zamalek (H)	5	5	0	444	367	+77	1.000	Advance to playoffs
2	(Angola) Petro de Luanda	5	4	1	421	326	+95	.800	Advance to playoffs
3	(South Africa) Cape Town Tigers	5	2	3	386	436	−50	.400 (Note: Head-to-head: Cape Town Tigers 73–70 FAP on 13 April 2022.)	Advance to playoffs
4	(Cameroon) FAP	5	2	3	341	347	−6	.400	Advance to playoffs
5	(South Sudan) Cobra Sport	5	1	4	370	408	−38	.200 (Note: Head-to-head: Cobra Sport 108–82 Espoir Fukash on 13 April 2022.)	
6	(Democratic Republic of the Congo) Espoir Fukash	5	1	4	394	472	−78	.200	

Source: BAL, Afrobasket
(H) Hosts

=== Games ===
Date Time, TV	Opponent	Result	Record	High points	High rebounds	High assists	Arena City
Group phase
April 10, 2022; 22:00	vs. (Angola) Petro de Luanda	L 61–90; Boxscore	0–1	17 – Ganapamo	11 – Sibanyoni	8 – Kabongo	Hassan Moustafa Sports Hall (230); Cairo
April 12, 2022; 19:00	vs. (Egypt) Zamalek	L 77–101; Boxscore	0–2	26 – Preston	10 – Sibanyoni	3 – Kabongo	Hassan Moustafa Sports Hall (250); Cairo
April 13, 2022; 19:00	vs. (Cameroon) FAP	W 73–70; Boxscore	1–2	24 – Ganapamo	8 – Sibanyoni	12 – Kabongo	Hassan Moustafa Sports Hall (100); Cairo
April 15, 2022; 18:30	vs. (South Sudan) Cobra Sport	W 83–79; Boxscore	2–2	23 – Preston	14 – Preston	7 – Kabongo	Hassan Moustafa Sports Hall (208); Cairo
April 19, 2022; 18:30	vs. (Democratic Republic of the Congo) Espoir Fukash	L 92–96 ^{OT} Boxscore	2–3	25 – Preston	11 – Prinsloo	6 – Preston	Hassan Moustafa Sports Hall (865); Cairo
Playoffs
May 22, 2022; 18:00	vs. (Tunisia) US Monastir; Quarterfinal	L 67–106	2–4	15 – Early	8 – Prinsloo	5 – Kabongo	Kigali Arena (718); Kigali
