= Florsheim Ngwenya =

South African basketball coach

Johannesburg Giants
- Position: Head coach
- League: South African National Basketball Championship

Career history

Coaching
- 2005–2007: South Africa (assistant)
- 2007–2011: South Africa
- Egoli Magic
- 2022–2024: Cape Town Tigers (assistant and head coach)
- 2025–present: Johannesburg Giants

Career highlights
- 5× BNL champion (2015, 2016, 2019, 2021, 2023); 2x South African National Championship champion (2022, 2025)

Mlungisi Florsheim "Flosh" Ngwenya is a South African professional basketball coach. He is the current head coach of the Cape Town Tigers of the Basketball National League (BNL) and of the South Africa men's national team. He is the most successful coach in South African basketball history, with five national titles.

== Career ==
=== Club career ===
Ngwenya has been the head coach for the Egoli Magic and won four Basketball National League (BNL) championships, the most of any coach in league history.

Ngwenya has been head and assistant coach of the Cape Town Tigers since August 2022. He coached the team during their Road to BAL campaigns in 2022 and 2023, both times qualifying for the main tournament. In the 2023 BAL season, he served as the Tigers' assistant coach under Rasheed Hazzard. He also coached the Tigers in their debut season in the Basketball National League (BNL), guiding them to the championship.

On May 31, 2024, Ngwenya sealed the fourth place in the 2024 BAL season with the Tigers, the best result in the club's history. The Tigers eventually were disestablished following financial issues.

In September 2025, Ngwenya was the head coach of the newly-established team Johannesburg Giants and led them to the national championship in their debut season.

=== National team career ===
After serving as an assistant coach, among others at AfroBasket 2005. Then, he was appointed head coach and Ngwenya led the South Africa men's national team from 2007 to 2011, including at the AfroBasket 2011 tournament in Madagascar.

On 8 February 2023, Basketball South Africa announced it had appointed Ngwenya as head coach of the South Africa national team.

== Coaching record ==
=== BAL ===
Legend
Regular season	G	Games coached	W	Games won	L	Games lost	W–L %	Win–loss %
Playoffs	PG	Playoff games	PW	Playoff wins	PL	Playoff losses	PW–L %	Playoff win–loss %

Team	Year	G	W	L	W–L%	Finish	PG	PW	PL	PW–L%	Result
Cape Town Tigers	2024	4	1	3	.250	3rd in Kalahari Conference	4	1	3	.250	Fourth place

== Personal ==
Ngwenya was named after the American classic shoe brand Florsheim Shoes by his father, who owned multiple pairs of the brand.
