= 2024 BNL season =

- League: Basketball National League
- Sport: Basketball
- Duration: June 22 – September 28, 2024 (group stage); October 12–20, 2024 (final round)
- Number of teams: 11
- Season MVP: Sifiso Gininda (Marlins)

Playoffs
- Finals champions: KwaZulu Marlins (2nd title)
- Runners-up: Mpumalanga Rhinos

Seasons
- ← 2023

The 2024 BNL season was the 11th season of the Basketball National League (BNL), the top-flight basketball league in South Africa. The season began on June 22, 2024, and ended with the last game of the finals series on October 20, 2024.

The Cape Town Tigers were the defending champions, but were unable to defend their title as they withdrew from the league.

The KwaZulu Marlins won their second championship, its first in 27 years, as they had won their first title in the Premier League of 1997.

== Team changes ==
The league existed out of 11 teams. The BNL decided to enforce a promotion and relegation system and as such the last-ranked Eastern Cape Windbreakers were not part of the league this season, and MBB from Johannesburg joined the league. The defending champions Cape Town Tigers withdrew from the league, citing budgetary constraints.

== Group stage ==
The schedule was announced on June 9, 2024.

=== Group A ===
Pos	Team	Pld	W	L	GF	GA	GD	Pts	Qualification
1	Mpumalanga Rhinos	4	4	0	279	218	+61	8	Advance to semi-finals
2	Limpopo Pride	4	3	1	228	213	+15	7	
3	MBB	4	2	2	235	237	−2	6	Advance to semi-finals
4	Soweto Panthers	4	1	3	217	251	−34	5	
5	Free State Warriors	4	0	4	207	247	−40	4	
6	Northwest Eagles	4	0	4	248	323	−75	4	

Source: Afrobasket.com

=== Group B ===
Multiple games in Group B were not played and technical defeats were given.

Pos	Team	Pld	W	L	GF	GA	GD	Pts	Qualification
1	KwaZulu Marlins	5	5	0	399	309	+90	10	Advance to semi-finals
2	Western Cape Mountaineers	5	3	2	375	334	+41	8	
3	Egoli Magic	3	2	1	178	174	+4	5	
4	Tshwane Suns	5	2	3	345	360	−15	7	Advance to semi-finals
5	Northern Cape Zebras	4	1	3	243	288	−45	5	

Source: Afrobasket.com

== Playoffs ==
The playoffs began with the semifinals on October 12 and 13, 2024, in Johannesburg.

Semi-finals
Mpumalanga	67	66	133
Tshwane Suns	68	42	110
KwaZulu Marlins	78	74	152
MBB	59	67	126

Final
Mpumalanga Rhinos	55	68	123
KwaZulu Marlins	86	71	157
