= Johannesburg Giants =

- League: South African Championship; BAL
- Founded: 2025
- History: Johannesburg Giants (2025–present)
- Location: Johannesburg, South Africa
- Team colours: Navy, Red and White
- President: Berlina Moroole
- Head coach: Florsheim Ngwenya

The Johannesburg Giants Basketball Club are a South African basketball club based in Johannesburg. They play in the South African Championship and will make their debut in the Basketball Africa League (BAL) in 2026.

== History ==
The club was founded in 2025, with Florsheim Ngwenya acting as both head coach and Chief Executive Officer, and Lesego Molebatsi holding the positions of Chief Operating Officer and Chief Financial Officer. Sam Vincent is the President of Basketball Operations. The Giants won the South African National Basketball Championship title after defeating KwaZulu Marlins in the final.

They then represented the country in the Road to BAL, making their debut in the 2026 BAL qualification. In their first international game on October 29, 2025, they defeated Brave Hearts 67–49. On November 22, the Giants qualified for the 2026 BAL season after defeating Dar City from Tanzania in the semifinal. As such, they became the third South African team to play in the BAL, following the Cape Town Tigers and MBB.

In October 2026, the Giants won their second consecutive national title, after defeating 2024 champions MBB in the final.

== Honours ==
South African National Basketball Championship

- Champions (2): 2025, 2026

== Players ==
=== Current roster ===
Note: Flags indicate national team eligibility at FIBA-sanctioned events. Players may hold other non-FIBA nationalities not displayed.

Johannesburg Giants roster
Players
Coaches

Pos.	No.	Nat.	Name
PG	5	(South Africa)	Makgalemele, Lethabo
SG	6	(South Sudan)	Deing, Dhieu
SF	7	(South Africa)	Nsele, Bandile
SF	8	(South Africa)	Kasilembo, Yanick
SG	9	(South Africa)	Lele, Dylan
PG	10	(South Africa)	Tholo, Lehlogonolo
SG	11	(South Africa)	Mahlong, Aviwe
SG	12	(South Africa)	Ozabor, Joshua
SF	13	(Democratic Republic of the Congo)	Shine, Emmanuel
C	14	(South Africa)	Sibanyoni, Nkosinathi
SF	15	(South Africa)	Dim, Nino
C	21	(South Africa)	Reid, Liam
C	23	(South Africa)	Mthembu, Somusa
C	32	(South Africa)	Prinsloo, Pieter

Head coach

- (South Africa) Florsheim Ngwenya

Assistant coach(es)

- (South Africa) Yves Abdon
- (United States) Anthony Shelton

Legend

- (C) Team captain
- (DP) Development player
- (I) Import player
- Injured

- Roster
Updated: October 29, 2025
