= MBB Basketball =

Basketball team in Johannesburg, South Africa

MBB
- 2024–25 MBB Basketball season
- Nickname: Blue Soldiers; Team Yase Dladleni (The People's Team)
- League: BAL; BNL; South African National Basketball Championship; Inner City Super League
- Founded: 2010
- History: MBB Basketball Club; 2010–present
- Location: Johannesburg, South Africa
- Head coach: Sam Vincent (basketball)
- Ownership: Cyril Shabalala
Home	Away

Made by Ball Blue Soldiers, commonly known as MBB or MBB Blue Soldiers, is a South African basketball team based in Johannesburg. The team plays in the Basketball National League (BNL), the highest level of basketball in the country, following their promotion in 2024. They have won one National Championship title in 2024.

They made their debut in the Basketball Africa League (BAL) in the 2025 season.

== History ==
The team was founded as a social club in 2010 by a group of players who had moved from KwaZulu-Natal to Johannesburg, Gauteng. The team has been owned by former player Cyril Shabalala, who later also took reigns as head coach.

Although the team had been in existence informally, MBB started playing competitively for the first time when it joined the Gauteng regional Inner City Super League (ICSL) in 2023. They went on to win back-to-back championships in 2023 and 2024. The Blue Soldiers joined the Basketball National League (NBL) for the 2024 season, and later also won the BSA-organised National Championship title.

Their national championship title earned them the right to play in the 2025 BAL qualification, where they will make their debut in the Elite 16 phase, becoming the third South African team in the Road to BAL, behind the Jozi Nuggets and the Cape Town Tigers.

On January 12, 2025, MBB announced on Instagram that they would play in the 2025 season of the Basketball Africa League (BAL). On February 4, 2025, MBB announced Sam Vincent as their new head coach. Their participation was confirmed on 28 February 2025. On May 20, 2025, MBB won its first ever BAL game, defeating Nairobi City Thunder. The Blue Soldiers were eliminated in the last round, and finished with a 2–4 record.

The team uses the slogan ‘iTeam Yase Dladleni’, which roughly translates to "The People's Team".

== Honours ==
- South African National Basketball Championship (1): 2024
- Inner City Super League (2): 2023, 2024

== Players ==
=== Current roster ===
Note: Flags indicate national team eligibility at FIBA-sanctioned events. Players may hold other non-FIBA nationalities not displayed.

2025 MBB roster
Players
Coaches

Pos.	No.	Nat.	Name	Ht.	Age
PG	1	(Zimbabwe)	Pfachi, Dyvonne	1.89 m (6 ft 2 in)	31 – 9 February 1995
CG	2	(South Africa)	Dim, Nino	1.97 m (6 ft 6 in)	25 – 6 November 2000
SG	5	(Uganda)	Opong, Robinson	1.91 m (6 ft 3 in)	37 – 10 May 1989
SF	6	(United States)	Lenard, Teafale (I)	2.03 m (6 ft 8 in)	24 – 21 July 2002
G/F	10	(South Africa)	Selepe, Lebesa	1.90 m (6 ft 3 in)	35 – 13 March 1991
SF	12	(South Africa)	Mothiba, Neo	2.00 m (6 ft 7 in)	44 – 21 March 1982
F	13	(The Gambia)	Thielemans, Omar	2.03 m (6 ft 8 in)	27 – 23 September 1999
PF/C	14	(South Africa)	Sibanyoni, Nkosinathi	2.08 m (6 ft 10 in)	28 – 24 May 1998
SF	15	(Senegal)	Camara, Mouhamed (E)	2.05 m (6 ft 9 in)	21 – 1 April 2005
C	23	(South Africa)	Mokwena, Marcus	1.98 m (6 ft 6 in)	34 – 4 December 1991
PF	41	(South Africa)	Prinsloo, Pieter	2.08 m (6 ft 10 in)	34 – 7 January 1992
PG	45	(United States)	Mooring, Jovan (I)	1.88 m (6 ft 2 in)	31 – 14 December 1994
C	50	(South Africa)	Craig, David	2.18 m (7 ft 2 in)	23 – 13 July 2003

Head coach

- (United States) Sam Vincent

Assistant coach(es)

- (United States) Dean Murray
- (South Africa) Lindokuhle Sibankulu

Legend

- (C) Team captain
- Injured

- Roster
Updated: May 21, 2025

== Head coaches ==
- Cyril Shabalala: (–2025)
- Sam Vincent: (2025–present)
