= Nikola Jokanović =

South African-Serbian basketball player and coach (1961-2006)

Personal information
- Born: 1961 Titovo Užice, Serbia, Yugoslavia
- Died: 26 November 2006 (aged 44–45) Johannesburg, South Africa
- Listed height: 1.96 m (6 ft 5 in)

Career information
- NBA draft: 1983: undrafted
- Playing career: 1979–2006
- Position: Shooting guard
- Number: 7, 9, 12
- Coaching career: NA–2006

Career history

Playing
- 1979–1980: Prvi Partizan
- 1980–1985: Crvena zvezda
- 1985–1987: IMT
- 1989–1991: Radnički Beograd
- 1993–1994: Beobanka
- 2006: Tshwane Suns

Coaching
- 2006: Tshwane Suns

Career highlights
- Yugoslav Cup winner (1987)

Nikola Jokanović (Serbian Cyrillic: Никола Јокановић; 1961 – 26 November 2006) was a South African-Serbian professional basketball player and coach.

== Career ==
Jokanović started his playing career with a Užice-based team Prvi Partizan (nowadays Sloboda Užice). In 1980, he joined Crvena zvezda where he played for five seasons, until 1985. Afterward, he also played for two Belgrade-based teams IMT and Radnički.

In the mid-1990s, Jokanović moved to South Africa. In 2006, he was a player-coach for the Tshwane Suns of the South African Premier League (PBL).

On 26 November 2006, Jokanović died shortly after leaving the court in a PBL match against Olympians in Johannesburg. He collapsed in a dressing room at halftime.

== See also ==
- List of KK Crvena zvezda players with 100 games played
