= Masego Loate =

South African basketball player

North West Eagles
- Position: Point guard
- League: Basketball National League

Personal information
- Born: August 19, 1982 (age 44) Soweto, South Africa
- Listed height: 5 ft 8 in (1.73 m)

Career information
- Playing career: 2010–present

Career history
- 2014–present: North West Eagles

Masego "Lucky" Malakia Loate (born August 19, 1982), is a South African professional basketball player. He currently plays for the North West Eagles of the Basketball National League in South Africa.

He represented South Africa's national basketball team at the 2011 FIBA Africa Championship in Antananarivo, Madagascar, where he was his team's best 3 point shooter.
