= Suns =

Suns may refer to:

- Gold Coast Suns, Australian rules football team
- Phoenix Suns, basketball team
- The Sun, the star of the Solar System
- Stars, massive balls of plasma
- Sun (unit), or cun, a traditional Chinese unit of length
- An abbreviation for solar masses, solar radii, solar luminosities, or solar energy concentration
- Tshwane Suns, South African basketball team

== See also ==
- Sun (disambiguation)
