= Neo Mothiba =

South African basketball player

No. 12 – MBB Blue Soldiers
- Position: Small forward

Personal information
- Born: 21 March 1982 (age 44) Soshanguve, Pretoria, South Africa
- Listed height: 1.98 m (6 ft 6 in)
- Listed weight: 107 kg (236 lb)

Career history
- Pretoria Heat
- Soweto Panthers
- Tshwane Suns
- Egoli Magic
- Jozi Nuggets
- 2024–present: MBB Blue Soldiers

Neo Kgalabi Mothiba (born 21 March 1982) is a South African basketball player who currently plays with MBB of the Basketball National League (BNL).

He is also a member of the South Africa national team and appeared with the club at the 2005, 2007 and 2009 African Championships as well as the 2006 Commonwealth Games.
