= Miguel Ferrão =

South African-Portuguese basketball player

Western Cape Mountaineers
- Position: Small forward / power forward
- League: BNL

Personal information
- Born: 16 January 1996 (age 30) Johannesburg, South Africa
- Listed height: 2.05 m (6 ft 9 in)

Career information
- College: University of the Witwatersrand
- NBA draft: 2018: undrafted
- Playing career: 2015–present

Career history
- 2015–2021: Egoli Magic
- 2021: Cape Town Tigers
- 2022: Western Cape Mountaineers

Career highlights
- BNL Most Valuable Player (2021); 2× BNL champion (2016, 2021)

Miguel Pedro Ho Ferrão (born 16 January 1996) is a South African-Portuguese basketball player for the Western Cape Mountaineers. In international competitions, Ferrão represents South Africa, although he competed for Portugal in the youth ranks.

== College career ==
Ferrão attended University of the Witwatersrand in Johannesburg, and helped the Witwatersrand basketball team win the USSA national championship twice (in 2016 and 2018).

== Professional career ==
Ferrão played the first years of his career with the Egoli Magic of the Basketball National League (BNL). In the final of the 2020–21 season, he had 25 points and 21 rebounds and was named the league's MVP.

Since 2021, he is on the roster of the Cape Town Tigers. One year later, Ferrão played for the Western Cape Mountaineers and helped the team reach the finals, collecting Afrobasket.com All-League First Team honours in the process.

== National team career ==
Ferrão has played with the Portugal under-18 and under-20 team at their respective European Championships in the B division. He switched teams to South Africa and represented the country at AfroBasket 2017.
