= Nkosinathi Sibanyoni =

South African basketball player (born 1998)

No. 14 – Johannesburg Giants
- Position: Power forward / Center
- League: BAL

Personal information
- Born: May 24, 1998 (age 28) Mpumalanga, South Africa
- Listed height: 2.08 m (6 ft 10 in)

Career history
- Mpumalanga Rhinos
- Jozi Nuggets
- 2021: Egoli Magic
- 2021–2024: Cape Town Tigers
- 2024–2025: Urunani
- 2025: MBB
- 2025–present: Johannesburg Giants

Career highlights
- VBL champion (2024); VBL Defensive Player of the Year (2024); 2× BNL champion (2021, 2023); BNL Final MVP (2021)

Nkosinathi Sandile Sibanyoni (born May 24, 1998) is a South African professional basketball player for the Johannesburg Giants. Standing at 2.08 m (6 ft 10 in), he plays as center and has also played for the South Africa national team. Sibanyoni has been a key part of the Tigers in their BAL seasons and holds the record for most rebounds in a BAL game. He is nicknamed "Nathi".

== Professional career ==
Born in the province of Mpumalanga, Sibanyoni began playing in 2012 and his idol was Tim Duncan. He started his career playing in South Africa's Basketball National League (BNL) for the Mpumalanga Rhinos and later for the Jozi Nuggets of the Johannesburg Basketball League (JBL).

He played with the Egoli Magic and won the 2021 BNL championship with them while also winning the league's MVP award. He posted 15 pointns, 18 rebounds and 7 blocks in the championship game against the Tshwane Suns.

Sibanyoni joined the Cape Town Tigers in 2020 for the 2021 BAL qualification games, however, he was not selected for the main tournament. He made his debut in the Basketball Africa League (BAL) in the 2022 BAL season, and in his rookie season in the BAL, he averaged 5.3 points and 8.3 rebounds per game. On November 25, 2023, Sibanyoni had 14 points, 21 rebounds and 5 blocks in the Road to BAL semifinal win over COSPN which clinched the Tigers' qualification for the BAL.

On May 26, Sibanyoni recorded career-highs of 16 points and 25 rebounds in the Tigers' quarter-final win over FUS Rabat to qualify for the franchise's first semifinal appearance ever. He set a new all-time league record for most rebounds in a single game.

Sibanyoni joined the Burundian club Urunani of the Burundian Basketball Championship on June 24, 2024. Sibanyoni set a league rebounding record with 23 rebounds against Remesha. He won the championship with Urunani, following the finals win over Dynamo in seven games. He was also named the league's Defensive Player of the Year.

On March 20, 2025, he signed with South African team MBB, with whom he will play in the 2025 BAL season.
