= 2011 McDonald's All-American Boys Game =

American high school basketball game

| East | West |
|---|---|
| 111 | 96 |
| | 1st half | 2nd half | Total |
|---|---|---|---|
| East | 57 | 54 | 111 |
| West | 44 | 52 | 96 |
- Date: March 30, 2011
- Venue: United Center, Chicago, Illinois
- MVP: Michael Kidd-Gilchrist; James Michael McAdoo
- Referees: Don Olson; Jerry Scherzinger; Dave Cronin
- Attendance: 19,909
- Network: ESPN
- Announcers: Bob Wischusen (play–by–play); Stephen Bardo & Jay Williams (color commentators)

McDonald's All-American

The 2011 McDonald's All-American Boys Game was an All-star basketball game that was played on Wednesday, March 30, 2011, at the United Center in Chicago, Illinois, home of the Chicago Bulls. The game's rosters featured the best and most highly recruited high school boys graduating in 2011. The game was the 34th annual version of the McDonald's All-American Game first played in 1978.

== 2011 Game ==
The 2011 game was played at the Chicago Bulls' United Center in Chicago, Illinois, on March 30, 2011.

=== 2011 West Roster ===
| # | Name | Height | Weight | Position | Hometown | High school | College choice |
|---|---|---|---|---|---|---|---|
| 24 | Khem Birch | 6-9 | 210 | F/C | Montreal, Quebec, Canada | Notre Dame Preparatory School | Pittsburgh (Note: Birch transferred to UNLV midway through the 2011–12 season.) |
| 21 | Wayne Blackshear | 6-5 | 205 | G/F | Chicago, Illinois | Morgan Park High School | Louisville |
| 32 | Anthony Davis | 6-10 | 220 | F/C | Chicago, Illinois | Perspectives Charter School | Kentucky |
| 22 | Branden Dawson | 6-5 | 220 | G/F | Gary, Indiana | Lew Wallace High School | Michigan State |
| 12 | Myck Kabongo | 6-1 | 170 | G | Toronto, Ontario, Canada | Findlay Prep | Texas |
| 2 | Le'Bryan Nash | 6-7 | 230 | F | Dallas, Texas | Lincoln High School | Oklahoma State |
| 25 | Austin Rivers | 6-4 | 189 | G | Winter Park, Florida | Winter Park High School | Duke |
| 30 | Marquis Teague | 6-2 | 165 | G | Indianapolis, Indiana | Pike High School | Kentucky |
| 4 | Adonis Thomas | 6-7 | 210 | G/F | Memphis, Tennessee | Melrose High School | Memphis |
| 1 | Amir Williams | 6-10 | 220 | C | Birmingham, Michigan | Detroit Country Day School | Ohio State |
| 14 | Kyle Wiltjer | 6-10 | 221 | F | Portland, Oregon | Jesuit High School | Kentucky (Note: Wiltjer transferred to Gonzaga after the 2012–13 season.) |
| 40 | Cody Zeller | 6-10 | 210 | F | Washington, Indiana | Washington High School | Indiana |

=== 2011 East Roster ===
| # | Name | Height | Weight | Position | Hometown | High school | College choice |
|---|---|---|---|---|---|---|---|
| 32 | Bradley Beal | 6-5 | 177 | G | St. Louis, Missouri | Chaminade College Preparatory School | Florida |
| 21 | Chane Behanan | 6-7 | 230 | F | Bowling Green, Kentucky | Bowling Green High School | Louisville |
| 22 | Kentavious Caldwell-Pope | 6-5 | 190 | G | Greenville, Georgia | Greenville High School | Georgia |
| 5 | Michael Carter-Williams | 6-5 | 175 | G | Hamilton, Massachusetts | St. Andrew's School | Syracuse |
| 25 | Rakeem Christmas | 6-9 | 230 | F | Philadelphia, Pennsylvania | Academy of the New Church | Syracuse |
| 2 | Quinn Cook | 6-0 | 180 | G | Hyattsville, Maryland | Oak Hill Academy | Duke |
| 14 | Michael Gilchrist | 6-7 | 210 | F | Somerdale, New Jersey | St. Patrick High School | Kentucky |
| 15 | P. J. Hairston | 6-6 | 220 | G/F | Greensboro, North Carolina | Hargrave Military Academy | North Carolina |
| 44 | James Michael McAdoo | 6-8 | 210 | F | Norfolk, Virginia | Norfolk Christian School | North Carolina |
| 11 | Johnny O'Bryant III | 6-10 | 245 | C | Cleveland, Mississippi | East Side High School | LSU |
| 40 | Marshall Plumlee | 6-10 | 245 | F/C | Warsaw, Indiana | Christ School | Duke |
| 3 | Shannon Scott | 6-2 | 170 | G | Alpharetta, Georgia | Milton High School | Ohio State |

=== Coaches ===
The West team was coached by:

- Head Coach Gene Pingatore of St. Joseph High School (Westchester, IL)
- Asst Coach Bill Riley of St. Joseph High School (Westchester, IL)
- Asst Coach Daryl Thomas of St. Joseph High School (Westchester, IL)

The East team was coached by:

- Head Coach Bob Cimmino of Mt. Vernon High School (Mt. Vernon, NY)
- Asst Coach Brian Pritchett of Mt. Vernon High School (Mt. Vernon, NY)
- Asst Coach Dwayne Murray of Mt. Vernon High School (Mt. Vernon, NY)

== All-American Week ==
=== Schedule ===
- Monday, March 28: Powerade Jamfest
  - Slam Dunk Contest
  - Three-Point Shoot-out
  - Timed Basketball Skills Competition
- Wednesday, March 30: 34th Annual Boys All-American Game

The Powerade JamFest is a skills-competition evening featuring basketball players who demonstrate their skills in three crowd-entertaining ways. The slam dunk contest was first held in 1987, and a 3-point shooting challenge was added in 1989. A timed basketball skills competition was added to the schedule of events in 2009.

=== Contest Winners ===
- The 2011 Powerade Slam Dunk contest was won by LeBryan Nash.
- The winner of the 2011 3-point shoot-out was Kyle Wiltjer.
- The winner of the basketball skills competition was Michael Carter-Williams.

== See also ==
2011 McDonald's All-American Girls Game
