= Inner City Super League =

Semi-professional basketball league in Greater Johannesburg

Inner City Super League (ICSL)
- Founded: 2013
- First season: 2013
- Country: South Africa
- Province: Gauteng
- Region: Greater Johannesburg
- Divisions: 2
- Related competitions: South African National Basketball Championship
- Current champions: MBB (men's) (2024); Jozi Nuggets (women's) (2024)
- Most championships: Braamfontein Blues; Jozi Nuggets (3 titles each; men's); Phoenix (4 titles; women's)

The Inner City Super League (ICSL) is a South African semi-professional basketball league for men's and women's teams in Greater Johannesburg, as well as other places in Gauteng. It was founded in 2013 and most of the teams participating are based in the Gauteng province. The league has two men's division, one women's division as well as a junior division.

The league was founded by players from the Braamfontein Blues. Each season usually runs from February to May. In the men's category, Jozi Nuggets and the Braamfontein Blues are the most successful teams with three titles each. Phoenix is the most decorated women's team with four league titles.

== Format ==
In each division, a round-robin system is used for the regular season, after which the top four teams advance to the playoffs. In the men's leagues, there is a promotion and relegation system as the last-ranked team from the Division 1 relegates to the Division 2, while the best team from the D2 is promoted.

== Teams ==
=== Men's ===
==== Division 1 ====
ICSL Men's Division 1 teams
Team	Location
Braamfontein Blues	Braamfontein
City Prime	Johannesburg
Edenvale Lions Basketball Academy	Edenvale
MBB	Johannesburg
Midrand Heat	Midrand
Jozi Nuggets	Johannesburg
Pythons	Johannesburg
Randburg Rhinos	Randburg
Rising Suns	Johannesburg
Tshwane University of Technology	Tshwane
University of Johannesburg	Johannesburg
Wits University	Johannesburg

==== Division 2 ====
ICSL Men's Division 2 teams
Team
Alex Wolves
Goodfellas
IIEE MSA
Imperial Taitans
Young Legends
Skywalkers
Spartans
Jozi Stars
Sunfire
University of Johannesburg 2nd team
Wits Young Bucks

=== Women's ===
ICSL Women's teams
Team
A-Town Queens
Celtic's Finest
IEE MSA
Midrand Heat
Jozi Nuggets
Sacred Heart College
Tshwane University of Technology
University of Johannesburg 1st team
University of Johannesburg 2nd team
Wits University
Wits Young Bucks

== Champions ==
=== Men's ===
==== Division 1 ====
Division 1 champions
Season	Champions
2013	Jozi Nuggets
2014	Goodfellas
2015	Jozi Nuggets
2016	Jozi Nuggets
2017	Braamfontein Blues
2018	Braamfontein Blues
2019	Braamfontein Blues
2020	Not held
2021	Not held
2022	University of Johannesburg
2023	MBB
2024	MBB

==== Division 2 ====
Division 1 champions
Season	Champions
2015	Young Legends
2016	Braamfontein Blues
2017	Tshwane Phantoms
2018	Young Legends
2019	Not held
2020	Not held
2021	Not held
2022	Not held
2023	Spartans

=== Women's ===
Division 1 champions
Season	Champions
2016	V&J
2017	Phoenix
2018	Phoenix
2019	Phoenix
2020	Not held
2021	Not held
2022	Phoenix
2023	Corinthians BWA
2024	Jozi Nuggets
