= Christopher Gabriel =

South African basketball player (born 1988)

No. 50 – Western Cape Mountaineers
- Position: Center
- League: Basketball National League

Personal information
- Born: 19 December 1988 (age 37) Cape Town, South Africa
- Listed height: 2.11 m (6 ft 11 in)
- Listed weight: 125 kg (276 lb)

Career information
- College: New Mexico State (2008–2009); San Diego (2010–2011)
- NBA draft: 2012: undrafted
- Playing career: 2013–present

Career history
- 2014: Hopsi Polzela
- 2014–2018: Team FOG Næstved
- 2018: Stockholmo Montevideo
- 2018–2019: Real Canoe NC
- 2019: Shahrdari Qazvin
- 2021: Cape Town Tigers
- 2023: Cape Town Tigers
- 2024–present: Western Cape Mountaineers

Christopher James Gabriel (born 19 December 1988) is a South African basketball player who last played for the Cape Town Tigers and the South Africa national basketball team.

== Professional career ==
Gabriel started the 2018–19 season with Team FOG Næstved in Denmark, averaging 8.5 points and 4.6 rebounds in 28 games. On 19 May 2018, Gabriel signed with Stockholmo Montevideo in Uruguay.

Since 2021, Gabriel is on the roster of the Cape Town Tigers and helped the team win its first South African championship. He was also on the team during the 2022 BAL Qualifying Tournaments in the fall of 2021. The following two years, Gabriel was missing from the Tigers roster, before returning in the Road to BAL in November 2023.

== National team career ==
In 2009, Gabriel appeared with the South African national team at the 2009 African Championships. Gabriel averaged 10.2 points and 6.4 rebounds per game as one of South Africa's top players, but the team finished in 15th place in the tournament.

== See also ==
- South Africa national basketball team
