= Lindokuhle Sibankulu =

South African basketball player

MBB
- Title: Assistant coach
- League: BAL

Personal information
- Born: 9 April 1981 (age 45)
- Listed height: 198 m (649 ft 7 in)
- Listed weight: 107 kg (236 lb)

Career information
- College: Erskine (2002–2003)
- Position: Forward

Career history

Coaching
- 2025–present: MBB (assistant)

Lindokuhle Nduduzo Sibankulu (born 9 April 1981) is a South African former basketball player and current coach. He played with the APN, Jozi Nuggets, among others. In 2002–03, he was a college basketball player with Erskine Flying Fleet in the United States. He was also a member of the South Africa national basketball team, and appeared with the club at the 2005 and 2009 and 2011 Afrobasket tournaments.

== Coaching career ==
In May 2025, Sibankulu was an assistant coach with MBB Basketball during their Basketball Africa League (BAL) campaign.
