= Tatenda Maturure =

Zimbabwean basketball player (born 1988)

No. 21 – Mercenaries
- Position: Shooting guard
- League: Manicaland Basketball Association

Personal information
- Born: 14 August 1988 (age 38) Harare, Zimbabwe
- Listed height: 1.88 m (6 ft 2 in)

Career history
- Harare City Hornets
- 2018: Soweto Panthers
- 2019: Mercenaries

Career highlights
- BNL Most Valuable Player (2018); BNL champion (2018)

Tatenda Paul Maturure (born 14 August 1988) is a Zimbabwean professional basketball player for Mercenaries of the Manicaland Basketball Association (MBA).

== Club career ==
Maturure has spent a large part of his career with the Harare City Hornets in Zimbabwe. He has also played for Raiders and JBC.

In 2018, he joined the Soweto Panthers of the Basketball National League in South Africa and was named the league's most valuable player (MVP) after winning a championship.

In 2021, Maturure was named the MVP of the Decade by the Basketball Union of Zimbabwe (ZUB).

== National team career ==
Maturure plays for the Zimbabwean national team. He was one of the team's top scorers at AfroBasket 2015.
