= Thabo Sithole =

South African basketball player

No. 2 – Cape Town Tigers
- Position: Point guard

Personal information
- Born: 10 June 1995 (age 29); KwaZulu-Natal, South Africa
- Listed height: 1.90 m (6 ft 3 in)

Career information
- High school: Durban High School (Durban, South Africa)

Career history
- Duzi Royals
- 2015–2016: Žalgiris-2
- 2018–2021: KwaZulu Marlins
- 2019: Jozi Nuggets
- 2021–present: Cape Town Tigers

Thubelihle Thabo Sithole (born 10 June 1995) is a South African basketball player for Cape Town Tigers and the South Africa national basketball team.

== Early life ==
Born in KwaZulu-Natal, Sithole attended Durban High School and started playing basketball seriously at age 8.

== Professional career ==
In December 2015, Sithole signed with Žalgiris, as a result of head coach Darius Dimavičius's visit to South Africa. Sithole started his professional career in Lithuania with Žalgiris-2 in the second-tier National Basketball League (NKL).

In 2018, he signed in South Africa with the KwaZulu Marlins of the Basketball National League (BNL).

In October 2019, Sithole played with the Jozi Nuggets in the 2021 BAL qualifiers. Since 2021, Sithole is on the roster of the Cape Town Tigers.

== National team career ==
Sithole has played for the South Africa national basketball team. He played with the team at AfroBasket 2017. He had also played for the country's Under-16 team before.

== Personal ==
Sithole has been in a Master program of Development Science at the University of KwaZulu-Natal.
