= South Africa women's national under-16 basketball team =

South Africa
- FIBA zone: FIBA Africa
- National federation: BSA

World Championships for Women
- Appearances: None

African Championships for Women
- Appearances: None

The South Africa women's national under-16 basketball team is a national basketball team of South Africa, administered by the Basketball South Africa.

It represents the country in international under-16 (under age 16) women's basketball competitions.

It appeared at the 2015 FIBA Africa Under-16 Championship for Women qualification round.

== See also ==
- South Africa women's national basketball team
- South Africa women's national under-18 basketball team
- South Africa men's national under-16 basketball team
