= Myck Kabongo =

Congolese-Canadian basketball player

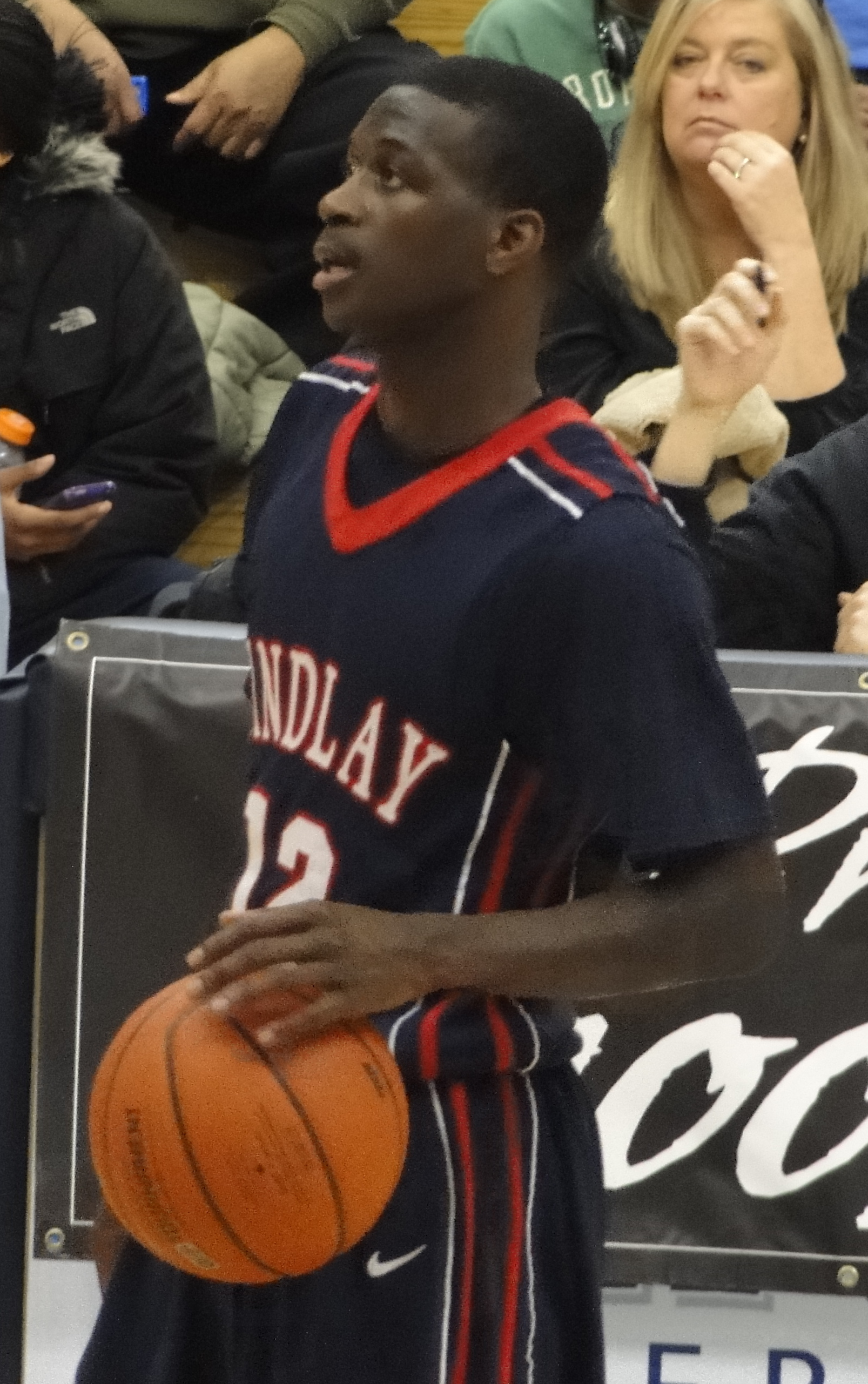
- Kabongo at Findlay Prep in 2010

Salt Lake City Stars
- Title: Assistant coach Player development ccoach
- League: NBA G League

Personal information
- Born: January 12, 1992 (age 34) Lubumbashi, Democratic Republic of Congo
- Listed height: 6 ft 3 in (1.91 m)
- Listed weight: 180 lb (82 kg)

Career information
- High school: Findlay Prep (Henderson, Nevada)
- College: Texas (2011–2013)
- NBA draft: 2013: undrafted
- Playing career: 2013–2024
- Position: Point guard
- Coaching career: 2024–present

Career history

Playing
- 2013–2014: Austin Toros
- 2014: Fort Wayne Mad Ants
- 2015: Texas Legends
- 2015–2016: Erie BayHawks
- 2016–2017: BCM U Pitești
- 2017: Rayos de Hermosillo
- 2018: Zornotza ST
- 2018: STB Le Havre
- 2018–2019: Raptors 905
- 2019: Guelph Nighthawks
- 2019–2020: Svendborg Rabbits
- 2020–2021: Akademija FMP
- 2021: Ferroviário de Maputo
- 2021: Al Rayyan
- 2021–2022: Cape Town Tigers
- 2023–2024: Scarborough Shooting Stars

Coaching
- 2024–present: Salt Lake City Stars (assistant)

Career highlights
- CEBL champion (2023); BAL assists leader (2021); McDonald's All-American (2011); Fourth-team Parade All-American (2011)
- Stats at Basketball Reference

Myck Lukusa Kabongo (born January 12, 1992) is a Congolese-Canadian former professional basketball player currently working as an assistant coach and player development coach for the Salt Lake City Stars of the NBA G League. He played college basketball for the Texas Longhorns.

In international competition, Kabongo played for the DR Congo national team, with whom he played at AfroBasket 2017.

== High school career ==
Kabongo started his high school career at Eastern Commerce Collegiate Institute in Toronto in Grade 9. He then transferred before Grade 10 alongside fellow Canadian Tristan Thompson for a season-and-a-half at St. Benedict's Prep before Thompson was removed from the team and transferred to Findlay Prep in Henderson, Nevada. Kabongo stayed at St. Benedict's through his Grade 11 season before he transferred to Findlay Prep for 12th Grade year. Kabongo was the #10 player in the class of 2011 by Scout.com and in the ESPNU 100. Rivals.com rated as the #26 player. He was selected to play in the 2011 McDonald's All-American Game and the 2011 Jordan Brand Classic.

=== College commitment ===
Kabongo committed to Texas on January 12, 2009, on his 17th birthday. On October 30, 2010, Kabongo decommitted from Texas, but 5 days later, he recommitted, and signed his letter of intent.

College recruiting
| Name | Hometown | School | Height | Weight | Commit date |
|---|---|---|---|---|---|
| Myck Kabongo; PG | Toronto, Ontario | Findlay Prep | 6 ft 2 in (1.88 m) | 170 lb (77 kg) | Nov 4, 2010 |
| Myck Kabongo; PG | Recruit ratings: Scout: Rivals: (97) | | | | |
Overall recruit ranking: Scout: 10; 2 (PG) Rivals: 26; 5 (PG) ESPN: 10; 2 (PG)
Note: In many cases, Scout, Rivals, 247Sports, On3, and ESPN may conflict in their listings of height and weight.; In these cases, the average was taken. ESPN grades are on a 100-point scale.; Sources: "Texas Basketball Commitments". Rivals.; "2011 Texas Basketball Commits". Scout.; "ESPN". ESPN.; "Scout.com Team Recruiting Rankings". Scout.; "2011 Team Ranking". Rivals.

== College career ==
Kabongo started playing for Texas in the 2011–12 season. Kabongo was under investigation for alleged inappropriate contact with Rich Paul, an agent who also handles the contracts of former Findlay Prep and current NBA players Tristan Thompson and Cory Joseph. Initially banned for the entire 2012–13 season, his suspension was later reduced to 23 games, and he made his debut in mid-February and would go on to average 14.6 points per game in eleven games.

In April 2013, he declared for the NBA draft, forgoing his final two years of college eligibility.

== Professional career ==
After going undrafted in the 2013 NBA draft, Kabongo joined the Miami Heat for the 2013 NBA Summer League. On September 30, 2013, he signed with the San Antonio Spurs. However, he was waived by the Spurs on October 15, 2013. On October 31, 2013, he was acquired by the Austin Toros of the NBA Development League.

On October 30, 2014, Kabongo was acquired by the Austin Spurs. On November 1, 2014, he was traded to the Fort Wayne Mad Ants. On December 29, 2014, he was waived by the Mad Ants after appearing in 16 games while averaging 8.8 points, 4.1 rebounds and 3.3 assists per game. On January 9, 2015, he was acquired by the Texas Legends. Five days later, he was waived by the Legends after appearing in just two games.

On October 31, 2015, Kabongo was selected by the Delaware 87ers in the second round of the 2015 NBA Development League Draft, only to be traded to the Erie BayHawks on draft night.

On August 27, 2016, Kabongo signed with BCM U Pitești of the Romanian Liga Națională.

On January 4, 2018, Kabongo signed with Zornotza Saskibaloi Taldea of the Spanish Liga EBA.

On February 23, 2018, Kabongo signed with STB Le Havre of the French LNB Pro B. Kabono joined the Guelph Nighthawks of the Canadian Elite Basketball League in 2019, but was waived on July 22. Kabongo joined the Svendborg Rabbits in 2019. He averaged 12.4 points, 3.8 rebounds, 2.8 assists, and 1.6 steals per game. On September 10, 2020, Kabongo signed with Akademija FMP in the Macedonian First League.

On May 1, 2021, Kabongo signed with Mozambican club Ferroviário de Maputo to play in the Basketball Africa League (BAL). He was a key part of Ferroviário's run to the quarterfinals in the first BAL season.

Starting from November 2021, Kabongo played for Al-Rayyan in the Qatari Basketball League. On December 5, he scored 42 points and had 11 assists in a 111–91 win over rival Al Ahli.

On December 7, 2021, Kabongo joined South African champions Cape Town Tigers to play for the team in the 2022 BAL qualification games.

== National team ==
Kabongo represented the DR Congo national basketball team at the AfroBasket 2017 in Senegal/Tunisia where he finished among the top players in the categories assists per game (4.8) and steals per game (2.8).

Kabongo was invited to camp with Canada's national team for the 2013 FIBA Americas Championship but failed to make the final roster.

== Amateur career ==
Kabongo competes for Overseas Elite in annual The Basketball Tournament. He was a point guard on the 2015 team who won TBT's $1 million prize.

== Coaching career ==
On October 4, 2024, Kabongo was hired as an assistant coach and player development coach by the Salt Lake City Stars of the NBA G League.

== Personal life ==
Kabongo was born and raised in Lubumbashi, a city in Zaire (now known as the Democratic Republic of the Congo). He has four brothers, including actor Emmanuel Kabongo, and one sister Vanessa who obtained an athletic scholarship and played basketball at the University of Delaware from 2007 to 2012. In 1998, Kabongo immigrated to Toronto with his family after five years of living in South Africa.

== Awards and honors ==
- 2011 McDonald's All-American team selection
- 2011 Jordan Brand High School All-American team selection
- 2012 Big 12 All-Rookie team selection
- 2021 BAL assists leader

== BAL career statistics ==
Legend
| GP | Games played | GS | Games started | MPG | Minutes per game |
| FG% | Field goal percentage | 3P% | 3-point field goal percentage | FT% | Free throw percentage |
| RPG | Rebounds per game | APG | Assists per game | SPG | Steals per game |
| BPG | Blocks per game | PPG | Points per game | **Bold** | Career high |

| Year | Team | GP | GS | MPG | FG% | 3P% | FT% | RPG | APG | SPG | BPG | PPG |
|---|---|---|---|---|---|---|---|---|---|---|---|---|
| 2021 | Ferroviário | 4 | 4 | **34.2** | .236 | **.208** | **.826** | 5.0 | **6.8*** | 2.3 | .0 | **12.5** |
| 2022 | Cape Town | **6** | **6** | 31.2 | **.278** | .125 | .625 | **5.3** | 6.7 | 2.3 | .0 | 8.8 |
