= Stafford, Gauteng =

Stafford
- Location within Gauteng Location within South Africa
- Coordinates: 26.228°S 28.048°E
- Country: South Africa
- Province: Gauteng
- Municipality: City of Johannesburg
- Established: 1937

Area
  - Total: 0.52 km^{2} (0.20 sq mi)

Population (2001)
  - Total: 63
  - Density: 120/km^{2} (310/sq mi)
- Time zone: UTC+2 (SAST)
- Postal code (street): 2197

Stafford is a suburb of Johannesburg, South Africa. It's an industrial suburb located south of the Johannesburg CBD, close to Springfield. It is located in Region F of the City of Johannesburg Metropolitan Municipality.

== History ==
The suburb was established on land called the Booysen Estate. It became a suburb on 7 July 1937 and is named after the landowner, Arentz Edward Stafford.

== Sports ==
Stafford is home to the games of the Basketball National League, South Africa's top basketball division. The games take place at the Wembley Stadium, a former ice-rink which holds up to 3,000 visitors.
