= Lehlogonolo Tholo =

South African basketball player

No. 10 – Johannesburg Giants
- Position: Point guard
- League: Road to BAL

Personal information
- Born: 12 November 1992 (age 34) Pretoria, South Africa
- Listed height: 1.83 m (6 ft 0 in)

Career history
- Duzi Royals
- Egoli Magic
- 2020–2021: Soweto Panthers
- 2021–2023: Cape Town Tigers
- 2025–present: Johannesburg Giants

Career highlights
- BNL Final MVP (2021); BNL All-First Team (2021)

Lehlogonolo "Hlogi" Sechaba Tholo (born 12 November 1992) is a South African basketball player who last played for the Johannesburg Giants and the South Africa national basketball team.

== Professional career ==
In the 2021 season, Tholo played with the Soweto Panthers. With the Panthers, he reached the BNL Final in which he recorded 25 points, 5 rebounds in 7 assists. As a result, Tholo was named the Final MVP.

From 2021 to 2023, Tholo was on the roster of the Cape Town Tigers, and played in the Road to BAL tournaments.

== National team career ==
Tholo has played for the South Africa national basketball team. He played with the team at AfroBasket 2017. On Gameday 2, he had 12 points in the game against Mozambique.
