= Evans Ganapamo =

Central African basketball player (born 1994)

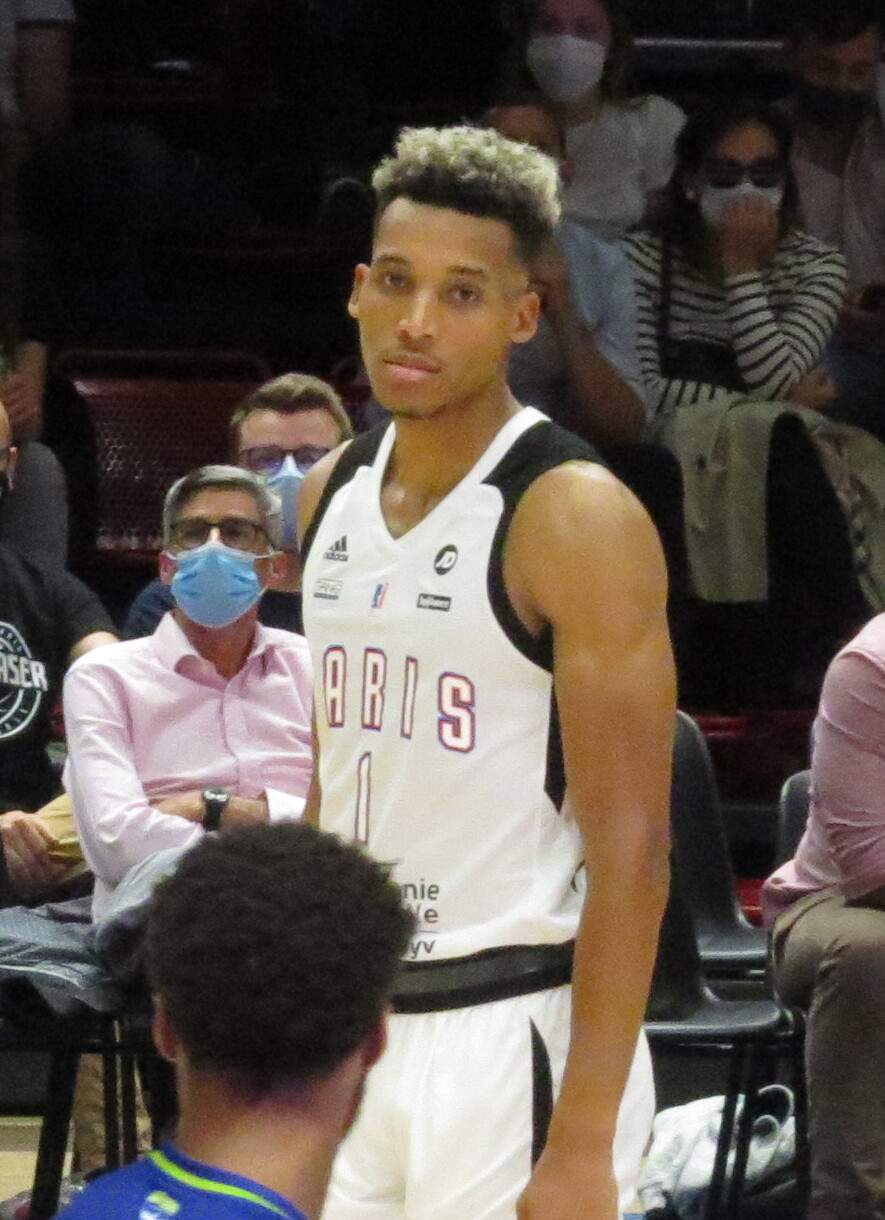
- Ganapamo with Paris Basketball in 2020

Free agent
- Position: Shooting guard

Personal information
- Born: 19 August 1994 (age 32) Montpellier, France
- Listed height: 6 ft 7 in (2.01 m)
- Listed weight: 205 lb (93 kg)

Career information
- High school: Mandeville High School
- College: New Orleans (2012–2016); Prairie View A&M (2016–2017)
- NBA draft: 2017: undrafted
- Playing career: 2017–present

Career history
- 2017–2018: SB/DJK Rosenheim
- 2018–2021: Paris Basketball
- 2021–2023: Cape Town Tigers
- 2023: Montreal Alliance
- 2023–2024: Bangui Sporting Club
- 2024–2025: Njarðvík
- 2025: Nairobi City Thunder
- 2025–2026: Johannesburg Giants

Career highlights
- 3× South African League champions (2021, 2022, 2025)

Evans Ganapamo (born 19 August 1994) is a French-Central African professional basketball player for the Johannesburg Giants. He played college basketball at the University of New Orleans and Prairie View A&M University. Internationally, Ganapamo represents the Central African Republic national team.

== Early life and college career ==
Ganapamo was born in France to Central African parents and moved to the United States at age 12 where his father was working as a doctor. He played college basketball for the University of New Orleans after receiving a scholarship. Ganapamo suffered from injuries and a debilitating staphylococcus infection in his second season. He moved to Prairie View A&M for the 2016–17 season.

== Professional career ==
Ganapamo started his professional career in 2016 with SB/DJK Rosenheim of the German fourth-tier Regionaliga, where he averaged 22.9 points and 7.8 rebounds per game.

He then went on to play three seasons for Paris Basketball of the French second-tier LNB Pro B. He suffered a torn ACL in a friendly game for the CAF, causing him to miss most of his first two seasons in Paris. In the 2020–21 season, Ganapamo played 14 games in the LNB Pro A.

In 2021, Ganapamo joined the newly established South African team Cape Town Tigers. After winning the national championship, he helped the Tigers qualify for their first-ever Basketball Africa League (BAL) appearance. In his first BAL season, he averaged a team-high 16.2 points per game. Ganapamo signed for the Milwaukee Bucks to play in the 2022 NBA Summer League, becoming the second BAL player to play in the NBA Summer League after Anas Mahmoud in 2021.

Ganapamo joined Bangui Sporting Club in 2023 and helped the team win the Bangui Basketball League and thus sealed Sporting’s qualification for the Road to BAL.

In December 2024, Ganapamo signed in Iceland with Njarðvík of the Úrvalsdeild karla. On 16 January 2025, he scored a season high 44 points against Reykjanesbær rivals Keflavík. He left the team in March before its last regular season game. In 12 games, he averaged 16 points and 4 rebounds.

On May 17, 2025, Ganapamo made his debut for the Nairobi City Thunder in the 2025 BAL season.

In September 2025, he joined the newly-established South African club Johannesburg Giants, and went on to win the South African National Basketball Championship in their first participation, his third national title.

== National team career ==
After a successful season with Rosenborg, Ganapamo was selected for the Central African Republic national team and made his debut in 2018 in the 2019 World Cup qualification.

== Honours ==
Cape Town Tigers

- 2× South African National Basketball Championship: (2021, 2022)

Johannesburg Giants

- South African National Basketball Championship: (2025)

Bangui Sporting Club

- Bangui Basketball League: (2023)

== Personal ==
Ganapamo's parents are from the Central African Republic.
