= Cape Town Tigers =

South African basketball club

- 2023–24 Cape Town Tigers season
- League: BNL; BAL; South African National Championship
- Founded: 2019
- History: Cape Town Tigers; 2019–present
- Location: Gugulethu, Cape Town, South Africa
- Team colors: Black, White, Gold
- Head coach: Florsheim Ngwenya
- Ownership: Severus LLC
- Championships: 3 (2021, 2022, 2023 BNL)
- Website: www.capetowntigers.com
Home	Away

The Cape Town Tigers are a South African professional basketball team founded in Cape Town. The Tigers have played in the Basketball National League (BNL) and played in three seasons of the Basketball Africa League (BAL) between 2022 and 2024.

Established in 2019, the Tigers are based in Gugulethu, and have won the South African national championship three times, and qualified for the BAL through the Road to BAL three times.

== History ==
The Cape Town Tigers (Pty) Ltd. was founded in 2019 by U.S.-based holding company Severus LLC.

The Tigers' first roster featured American import players Davon Dillard, Shaq McFarlan and Nigerian import Austin Ajukwa. Two former NBA players Billy Preston and Ben Uzoh joined the second roster in 2021 and helped winning the first national championship. Several players for the South African national team were also on the team, such as Pieter Prinsloo, Christopher Gabriel, Thabo Sithole and Lehlogonolo Tholo.

In September 2021, the Tigers won their first national championship. The team beat Jozi Nuggets after overtime in the final, behind Ben Uzoh who scored 22 points in the championship game. Later in the year, the team competed in the qualification games of the BAL for the first time. The team finished third without playing its last game which was forfeited by opponent New Star after players tested positive for COVID-19.

On August 22, 2022, the Tigers successfully defended their national title. Three months later, on November 26, the Tigers clinched their second consecutive BAL spot after beating City Oilers in the Road to BAL semi-finals.

The Cape Town Tigers were quarter-finalists in the BAL once again in 2023, as they lost to Stade Malien in the playoffs.

Since June 2023, the Cape Town Tigers have joined the Basketball National League (BNL), the most notable private men's league in the country. They won the 2023 championship, following a 5–0 record in the group phase and wide-margin wins in both the semi-finals and finals.

The Tigers had their most successful BAL season to date in the 2024 season, where they finished in fourth place. They were able to eliminate top-seeded FUS Rabat in the quarterfinals after overtime, but lost to the eventual champions Petro de Luanda in the semifinals. The Tigers' star player Samkelo Cele was named to the All-BAL Team, and was later invited to play in the NBA Summer League.

In June 2024, the Tigers withdrew from the 2024 BNL season as they faced "budgetary constraints". In August, the club was probed by FIBA for alleged player payment discrepancy. In August, founder and CEO Raphael Edwards stepped down.

== Honours ==
South African National Championship

- Champions (2): 2021, 2022

Basketball National League

- Champions (1): 2023

Basketball Africa League

- Fourth Place (1): 2024
- Quarterfinalist (2): 2022, 2023

== Season by season ==
Key
Playoffs berth

=== BAL (2022–present) ===
Season	League		Regular season					Postseason	Head coach	Captain
Season	League	Conference	Finish	Played	Wins	Losses	Win %	Postseason	Head coach	Captain
Cape Town Tigers
2022	BAL	Nile	3rd	5	2	3	.400	Lost quarterfinals (Monastir) 67–106	Relton Booysen	Pieter Prinsloo
2023	BAL	Nile	4th	5	2	3	.400	Lost quarterfinals (Stade Malien) 69–78	Rasheed Hazzard	Pieter Prinsloo
2024	BAL	Kalahari	3rd	4	1	3	.250	Lost seeding game (Al Ahly Ly) 67–87; Won quarterfinal (FUS Rabat) 91–88^{OT} Lost semifinal (Petro de Luanda) 86–96^{OT} Lost third place game (Rivers Hoopers) 57–80	Florsheim Ngwenya	Lebesa Selepe
Season record				14	5	9	.357			
Playoffs record				6	1	5	.167			

== Players ==
=== Current roster ===
Note: Flags indicate national team eligibility at FIBA-sanctioned events. Players may hold other non-FIBA nationalities not displayed.

Cape Town Tigers roster
Players
Coaches

Pos.	No.	Nat.	Name	Ht.	Age
	3	(South Africa)	Whitbread, Dylan		32 – 27 October 1994
G	5	(United States)	Ferguson, Terrance	1.98 m (6 ft 6 in)	28 – 17 May 1998
G	10	(South Africa)	Selepe, Lebesa	1.90 m (6 ft 3 in)	35 – 13 March 1991
G	11	(South Africa)	Mofokeng, Lebohang	1.94 m (6 ft 4 in)	34 – 24 July 1992
PF	14	(South Africa)	Sibanyoni, Nkosinathi	2.08 m (6 ft 10 in)	28 – 24 May 1998
SF	22	(United States)	Larrier, Terry	2.03 m (6 ft 8 in)	31 – 15 August 1995
	25	(South Africa)	Cele, Samkelo		28 – 28 December 1997
C	41	(South Africa)	Prinsloo, Pieter	2.08 m (6 ft 10 in)	34 – 7 January 1992
	44	(South Africa)	Bondonno, Luke		24 – 21 September 2002
C	50	(South Africa)	Gabriel, Christopher	2.11 m (6 ft 11 in)	37 – 19 December 1988

Head coach

- (South Africa) Florsheim Ngwenya

Legend

- (C) Team captain
- Injured

- Roster
Updated: 16 December 2023

=== Notable players ===
Note: Flags indicate national team eligibility at FIBA-sanctioned events. Players may hold other non-FIBA nationalities not displayed.

Criteria

To appear in this section a player must have either:

- Set a club record or won an individual award while at the club
- Played at least one official international match for their national team at any time
- Played at least one official NBA match at any time.

- (South Africa) Christopher Gabriel
- (South Africa) Pieter Prinsloo
- (South Africa) Lehlogonolo Tholo
- (South Africa) Thabo Sithole
- (South Africa) Miguel Ferrão
- (United States) Billy Preston
- (United States) Cleanthony Early
- (Democratic Republic of the Congo) Myck Kabongo
- (Nigeria) Ben Uzoh
- (Central African Republic) Evans Ganapamo
- (South Sudan) Dhieu Deing

== Head coaches ==
Thus far, the Tigers have had three head coaches:

- (United States) Raphael Edwards: (2021)
- (South Africa) Relton Booysen: (2021–2022)
- (South Africa) Florsheim Ngwenya: (2022)
- (United States) Rasheed Hazzard: (2023^{BAL})
- (South Africa) Florsheim Ngwenya: (2023-present)

^{BAL} denotes the coach only coached the Tigers during Basketball Africa League games.
