= South African National Basketball Championship =

South African Clubs Championship
- Organising body: Basketball South Africa
- Founded: 2021
- First season: 2021
- Country: South Africa
- Number of teams: 9
- Level on pyramid: 1
- Current champions: Johannesburg Giants (1st title) (2025)
- Most championships: Cape Town Tigers (2 titles)

The South African National Basketball Club Championship is the national championship for premier basketball teams in South Africa. The winner of the national championship qualifies for the qualifying tournaments of the Basketball Africa League (BAL). The privately organised Basketball National League (BNL) is considered the de facto top level basketball league in the country, and has had a representative in some seasons.

The competition is organised by Basketball South Africa, the national basketball federation, since 2021.

The competition was not held in 2023, but returned in 2024.

== Format and rules ==
Each team is allowed to register a maximum of 20 players, of which 4 can be foreign players. Of those 4 foreign players, 2 must be of African nationality. In the first four tournaments, 4 teams participated. In 2025, the tournament expanded to 9 teams with two groups and a final stage.

== Teams ==
- MBB (2024 Champions)
- Johannesburg Giants
- Rhodes Titans
- KwaZulu-Natal Marlins
- DUEP
- Montana Vikings
- Cape Peninsula University of Technology (CPUT)
- Cape Town Sharks
- Mbekweni

== Champions ==
Season	Champions	Finals score	Runners-up	Third place	Venue	City	Ref.
2021	Cape Town Tigers	76–70	Jozi Nuggets	KwaDukuza Kings	Walter Sisulu Hall	Randburg	
2022	Cape Town Tigers (2)	Round-robin	Jozi Nuggets	Tshwane Suns	Mandeville Sport Complex	Johannesburg	
2023	Not organised (Note: In the 2023 season, the Cape Town Tigers won the Basketball National League (BNL) championship and qualified for the Road to BAL as South African champions.)						
2024	MBB	80–58	TS Vikings	–	Mandeville Sport Complex	Johannesburg (2)	
2025	Johannesburg Giants	79–76	KwaZulu Marlins		University of Cape Town	Cape Town	

== Individual awards ==
=== 2025 ===
- MVP: Joshua Ozabor (Johannesburg Giants)
- All-Star Team:
  - Nino Dim (Johannesburg Giants), Thabo Sithole (MBB), George Williams (KwaZulu Marlins), Aviwe Mahlong (Johannesburg Giants), Ian Limbe (DUEP)
