= North West Eagles =

- Leagues: Basketball National League
- Founded: 1993
- Location: Potchefstroom, North West Province of South Africa
- Website: Official website

North West Eagles is a South African professional basketball team located in Potchefstroom, North West Province of South Africa. The team competes in the Basketball National League.

== Notable players ==
- (South Africa) Phemza The Kween
- (South Africa) Masego Loate
