= Sam Vincent (basketball) =

American basketball player and coach (born 1963)

APR
- Title: Defensive coach
- League: Basketball Africa League

Personal information
- Born: May 18, 1963 (age 63) Lansing, Michigan, U.S.
- Listed height: 6 ft 2 in (1.88 m)
- Listed weight: 185 lb (84 kg)

Career information
- High school: Eastern (Lansing, Michigan)
- College: Michigan State (1981–1985)
- NBA draft: 1985: 1st round, 20th overall pick
- Drafted by: Boston Celtics
- Playing career: 1985–1994
- Position: Point guard
- Number: 11, 14
- Coaching career: 1999–Present

Career history

Playing
- 1985–1987: Boston Celtics
- 1987–1988: Seattle SuperSonics
- 1988–1989: Chicago Bulls
- 1989–1992: Orlando Magic
- 1993–1994: Aris

Coaching
- 1999–2000: Gymnastikos S. Larissas
- 2000–2001: EiffelTowers Den Bosch
- 2001–2003: Mobile Revelers
- 2004–2005: Nigeria (women)
- 2005–2006: Fort Worth Flyers
- 2006: Nigeria (men)
- 2006–2007: Dallas Mavericks (assistant)
- 2007–2008: Charlotte Bobcats
- 2008–2009: Anaheim Arsenal
- 2014–2016: Manama Club
- 2017–2018: Nigeria (women)
- 2022–2025: Beacon College
- 2025: MBB
- 2025: Libya (men)
- 2025–present: APR (defensive coach)

Career highlights
- NBA champion (1986); Second-team All-American – NABC (1985); Third-team All-American – AP, UPI (1985); First-team Parade All-American (1981); McDonald's All-American (1981); Mr. Basketball of Michigan (1981)

Career NBA statistics
- Points: 3,106 (7.8 ppg)
- Assists: 1,543 (3.9 apg)
- Stats at NBA.com
- Stats at Basketball Reference
Medals
As coach in Women's basketball
Representing Nigeria
AfroBasket Women
Gold medal – first place	2005 AfroBasket for Women	team
Gold medal – first place	2017 AfroBasket for Women	team

James Samuel Vincent (born May 18, 1963) is an American former professional basketball player, and coach. He currently works as a defensive coach for MBB of the Basketball Africa League (BAL). Vincent was Mr. Basketball of Michigan in 1981, before playing with Michigan State, and turned professional after four years of college basketball. He became an NBA champion in 1986 with the Boston Celtics. Vincent began a coaching career in Europe after his retirement.

== Playing career ==
Vincent won the State of Michigan "Mr. Basketball" award in 1981, the first year the award was given. He attended Lansing's Eastern High School, where he scored 61 points in one game as a senior, breaking the previous city scoring record of 54 set by Magic Johnson at Everett High School.

A 6 ft 2 in (1.88 m) point guard, Vincent followed in the footsteps of his older brother Jay Vincent, attending Michigan State University and earning Sporting News All-America honors in 1985. After graduating from college, he was selected by the Boston Celtics with the twentieth pick of the 1985 NBA draft. He played two seasons for the Celtics, winning an NBA Championship ring as a reserve in 1986, before joining the Seattle SuperSonics, who promptly traded him to the Chicago Bulls for Sedale Threatt. After one-and-a-half solid seasons with the Bulls, he was selected by the Orlando Magic in the 1989 NBA expansion draft, and he finished his NBA career with the Magic in 1992. His 1990–1991 NBA Hoops basketball card has gained fame due to having Michael Jordan in view wearing a #12 jersey, instead of his normal #23. Vincent scored 3,106 points and tallied 1,543 assists during his seven-year tenure in the league.

Shortly after retiring, Vincent worked at Disney's Wide World of Sports in Walt Disney World. During the late 1990s, he coached basketball in South Africa, and he has also coached in Greece, Netherlands, Nigeria, and the NBA Developmental League; he went to the league finals in the NBADL twice, winning once. At the 2004 Summer Olympics, he led the Nigerian women's basketball team to a 68–64 victory over South Korea, which was the first ever victory by an African nation in an Olympic women's basketball contest.

== Coaching career ==
He was coach of the Fort Worth Flyers in the 2005–06 season. Shortly after coaching the Nigeria men's team to the second round of the 2006 FIBA World Championship (including a shocking upset of traditional power Serbia and Montenegro), he was hired as an assistant coach by the Dallas Mavericks.

On May 25, 2007, Vincent was introduced as the new head coach of the Charlotte Bobcats of the NBA. On April 26, 2008, Vincent was relieved of his head coaching duties. Later that year, Vincent was named the head coach of the Anaheim Arsenal of the NBA Development League.

=== Nigerian national team ===
Vincent assumed coaching the D'Tigress at the 2004 Summer Olympics. He led the team to a 68–64 victory over South Korea, the victory was the first victory by an African side in the women's basketball event in the Olympics. In 2005, Vincent led the Nigerian women's basketball team to their second African tournament victory, in the FIBA African Basketball Championship (later re-named AfroBasket). In 2017 he was announced to be coaching the team for the 2017 AfroBasket, eventually leading them to another gold medal, with a perfect, undefeated record in the Bamako, Mali tournament. The team clinched their third Afrobasket title by defeating Senegal 65–48 in the final and consequently qualified for the 2018 FIBA women's basketball World cup in Spain.

Vincent had his appointment as head coach of the Nigeria Women's Basketball Team terminated by the Nigeria Basketball Federation on Thursday, August 2 while the team was preparing for the 2018 FIBA Women's Basketball World Cup.

Vincent was appointed as head coach of the Bahrain national basketball team, replacing Serbian coach Darko Ruso. This was after having coached the Riffa, Manama and Al-Ahli Manama clubs.

In September 2022, Vincent was named the first head coach of the men's team at Beacon College, a liberal arts school in Central Florida.

On February 4, 2025, Vincent was announced as the new head coach of South African club MBB of the Basketball Africa League (BAL). Former Magic player Pat Burke took over the position as head men's basketball coach and director of athletics at Beacon in March 2025. MBB was eliminated in the group phase of the BAL, following a 2–4 record. On June 4, Vincent joined Rwandan team APR as a defensive coach ahead of the 2025 BAL playoffs, while also expressing his intention to stay on as MBB's head coach.

=== Libyan national team ===
For the 2025 FIBA AfroBasket, he became head coach for Team Libya.

== Personal ==
Vincent has kids, who have the South African nationality.

== Career playing statistics ==
Legend
GP	Games played	GS	Games started	MPG	Minutes per game
FG%	Field goal percentage	3P%	3-point field goal percentage	FT%	Free throw percentage
RPG	Rebounds per game	APG	Assists per game	SPG	Steals per game
BPG	Blocks per game	PPG	Points per game	**Bold**	Career high
†	Won an NBA championship

=== NBA ===
==== Regular season ====
Year	Team	GP	GS	MPG	FG%	3P%	FT%	RPG	APG	SPG	BPG	PPG
1985–86†	Boston	57	0	7.6	.364	.250	**.929**	.8	1.2	.3	.1	3.2
1986–87	Boston	46	5	8.1	.441	–	.927	.6	1.3	.3	.0	3.7
1987–88	Seattle	43	0	12.7	.474	**.385**	.767	1.1	3.2	.5	.1	4.5
1987–88	Chicago	29	27	**32.9**	.447	.375	.925	**3.6**	**8.4**	**1.2**	**.4**	**13.0**
1988–89	Chicago	**70**	**56**	24.3	**.484**	.118	.822	2.7	4.8	.8	.1	9.4
1989–90	Orlando	63	45	26.3	.457	.071	.879	3.1	5.6	1.0	.3	11.2
1990–91	Orlando	49	17	19.9	.431	.158	.825	2.2	4.0	.6	.1	8.3
1991–92	Orlando	39	18	22.7	.430	.077	.846	2.6	3.8	.9	.1	10.5
Career		396	168	19.0	.449	.182	.863	2.1	3.9	.7	.2	7.8

==== Playoffs ====
Year	Team	GP	GS	MPG	FG%	3P%	FT%	RPG	APG	SPG	BPG	PPG
1986†	Boston	9	0	4.6	.286	.000	**1.000**	.8	.6	.2	.0	2.4
1987	Boston	**17**	0	8.3	**.411**	**.500**	.771	.7	1.1	.2	**.1**	4.4
1988	Chicago	10	**10**	**25.1**	.373	.000	.800	**1.9**	**4.4**	**.8**	**.1**	**10.2**
1989	Chicago	16	0	7.1	.303	.000	.750	.5	1.2	.2	**.1**	1.8
Career		52	10	10.5	.361	.125	.795	.9	1.7	.3	.1	4.4

== Head coaching record ==
=== NBA ===
Legend
Regular season	G	Games coached	W	Games won	L	Games lost	W–L %	Win–loss %
Playoffs	PG	Playoff games	PW	Playoff wins	PL	Playoff losses	PW–L %	Playoff win–loss %

Team	Year	G	W	L	W–L%	Finish	PG	PW	PL	PW–L%	Result
Charlotte	2007–08	82	32	50	.390	4th in Southeast	—	—	—	—	Missed Playoffs
Career		82	32	50	.390		—	—	—	—	

=== College ===
Record table
Season	Team	Overall	Conference	Standing	Postseason
Beacon College NaviGators (men) () (2022–2023)
2022–23	Beacon College	0–5	Unaffiliated (Developmental Season)		
Beacon College Blazers (men) () (2023–Present)
2023–24	Beacon College	10–6	USCAA Division I Independent		
Total:		10–11 (.476)			
National champion Postseason invitational champion Conference regular season champion Conference regular season and conference tournament champion Division regular season champion Division regular season and conference tournament champion Conference tournament champion
