= Rasheed Hazzard =

American basketball coach (born 1976)

Personal information
- Born: August 5, 1976 (age 50) Los Angeles, California
- Listed height: 6 ft 0 in (1.83 m)

Career information
- High school: Venice (Los Angeles, California)
- College: George Washington (1994–1998)
- NBA draft: 1998: undrafted
- Position: Guard

Career history

Coaching
- 2000–2005: Venice HS
- 2005–2006: Portland (assistant)
- 2006–2011: Los Angeles Lakers (scout / assistant)
- 2006–2011: Los Angeles D-Fenders (assistant)
- 2014–2017: New York Knicks (assistant)
- 2020: Veltex Shizuoka (associate HC)
- 2020–2023: NBA G League Ignite (assistant)
- 2023: Cape Town Tigers

Career highlights
- As assistant coach: NBA champion (2010)

Rasheed Abdulrahman Hazzard (born August 5, 1976) is an American basketball coach. He was the current head coach of the Cape Town Tigers of the Basketball Africa League (BAL) in 2023. Hazzard is the son of Walt Hazzard who played for the Los Angeles Lakers. He played collegiately for George Washington University.

== Career ==
Hazzard started his coaching career as head coach of Venice High School in Los Angeles, staying there for five years. He then joined the college team Portland Pilots as assistant coach.

In 2006, he entered the Los Angeles Lakers organisation where he had different roles over the next five seasons. He was a part-time scout for the Lakers, while also being an assistant for the NBA D-League's Los Angeles D-Fenders part-time.

In 2014, Hazzard joined the New York Knicks as an assistant coach, where he would stay for three seasons.

On January 19, 2020, Hazzard was announced as the associate head coach for Veltex Shizuoka of the Japanese B.League.

Following his return to the United States, Razzard joined the NBA G League Ignite team as assistant.

In January 2023, the South African club Cape Town Tigers announced Hazzard as their new head coach. He guided the Tigers to a fourth place and a 2–3 record in the Nile Conference, qualifying for the playoffs.
