= Soweto Panthers =

- League: Basketball National League
- Founded: 1986
- President: Dr. A.S. Mokoena
- Head coaches: Nosipho Njokweni (women), Taurai Oscar Takarupiwa (Men)
- Championships: 2018

Soweto Panthers is a South African basketball club based in Soweto in Johannesburg. The team plays in the Basketball National League (BNL) and WBNL. The team was founded in 1986, the Men's won the BNL championship in 2018. The Women's team was formed in 2020 leading to the launch of the WBNL in 2021

The Soweto Panthers Men joined the BNL in 2011, the Ladies joined in 2020.

== Honors ==
In October 2018, the Panthers beat Egoli Magic 84–58 to captured the championship.

The Panthers were led by

Head coach: Steven Butler

General manager: Elvis Ukpong

Fitness and Conditioning Coach: Gcina Panyana

== League achievements ==
Champions - 2018

Finalist - 2019

Semifinals - 2013, 2014, 2016, 2017, 2021

Regular Season Champion - 2016, 2019

== Club members ==
=== Coaches ===
Nosipho Njokweni - women

Taurai Takarupiwe - men

=== Players 2021 ===
Women's Team
No.	Name	Surname
21	Divine	Muland
23	Gcina	Panyana
15	Ikageng	Aphane
13	Londeka	Gumede
12	Yibanathi	Mfazi
11	Nyaleti	Nyathi
9	Mapule	Mwale
8	Masego	Mothoa
7	Tracy	Hadebe
6	Monalisa	Maphumulo
5	Thando	Mbuthuma
4	Kamohelo	Raphoto

Men's Team
No.	Name	Surname
23	Amukelani	Golele
21	Gleen	Bidza
15	Sphiwe	Kubheka
13	Christian	Kabasele
12	Siphesihle	Hlongwane
11	Thandokuhle	Kunene
9	Mane	Mthiyani
8	Yves	Mulwisa
7	Tshepo	Mogotsi
6	Kabelo	Kubayi
5	Thabiso	Kenkana
4	Thabo	Kekana

== Notable players ==
- Set a club record or won an individual award as a professional player.
- Played at least one official international match for his senior national team at any time.

- (South Africa) Thabo Letsebe
- (South Africa) Neo Mothiba
- (South Africa) Lehlogonolo Tholo
- (Zimbabwe) Tatenda Maturure
- (South Africa) Lebohang Mofokeng
