= Pieter Prinsloo =

South African basketball player (born 1992)

No. 41 – Johannesburg Giants
- Position: Power forward / Center
- League: BAL

Personal information
- Born: 7 January 1992 (age 34) Pretoria, South Africa
- Listed height: 2.08 m (6 ft 10 in)
- Listed weight: 110 kg (243 lb)

Career information
- College: Marist (2010–2014)
- NBA draft: 2014: undrafted
- Playing career: 2014–present

Career history
- 2014–2016: ExSAL Santa Tecla
- 2015: Los Trinis de la Trinidad
- 2016: Stade Nabeulien
- 2016: Club Deportivo Calero
- 2016–2017: Costa Caribe Managua
- 2017: Lagos City Stars
- 2017–2018: Ferroviário da Beira
- 2018: Toros de Aragua
- 2018–2019: Círculo Gijón
- 2019–2020: Temuco
- 2020–2023: Cape Town Tigers
- 2023–2024: Universidad de Concepción
- 2024: MBB
- 2024–2025: Las Ánimas de Valdivia
- 2025: MBB
- 2025–present: Johannesburg Giants

Career highlights
- 2× South African National Basketball Championship winner (2021, 2022); BNL champion (2023)

Daniel Pieter Prinsloo (born 7 January 1992) is a South African professional basketball player who currently plays for the Johannesburg Giants. Prinsloo has also played for the South Africa national team. Standing at 2.08 m (6 ft 10 in), he plays as power forward or center.

== Early life ==
Born in Pretoria West, Prinsloo was initially interested in playing cricket or rugby. When his father emigrated to the United States, he started playing football.

== Professional career ==
After spending the first four years as professional in several teams from Latin America and Africa. His first contract was with ExSAL Santa Tecla in El Salvador. He later joined Los Trinis de la Trinidad, a team based in Nicaragua. In 2016, he had a short stint with Bolivian team Calero in the Liga Boliviana de Basquetbol. After this, Prinsloo returned to Nicaragua to play for Costa Caribe Managua.

In September 2018, Prinsloo signed for Spanish LEB Plata team Círculo Gijón. However, due to problems with his visa, he could not arrive to Asturias until December.

In 2017, Prinsloo played his first professional contract with the Lagos City Stars in the Continental Basketball League.

In 2020, Prinsloo moved to the newly-established Cape Town Tigers. He helped the Tigers win three national championships. Prinsloo was an instrumental part for the team in the 2022 BAL qualifiers. He then went on to play in the 2022 season and the 2023 season of the Basketball Africa League (BAL), the continental premier league.

In December 2023, Prinsloo moved to Chile to play for Universidad de Concepción of the LNB Chile and the BCL Americas.

He shortly returned to South Africa, to join MBB for the South African National Basketball Championship. Prinsloo joined Las Ánimas de Valdivia in October 2024. Prinsoo returned to the MBB roster during the group phase. On May 20, 2025, he scored a BAL career-high 30 points to lead MBB to its first ever win in the league, over the Nairobi City Thunder.

== International career ==
Prinsloo played the AfroBasket 2017 with the South Africa national basketball team. He averaged 12.3 points and 4.7 rebounds in the three games he played.

== Career statistics ==
Legend
GP	Games played	GS	Games started	MPG	Minutes per game
FG%	Field goal percentage	3P%	3-point field goal percentage	FT%	Free throw percentage
RPG	Rebounds per game	APG	Assists per game	SPG	Steals per game
BPG	Blocks per game	PPG	Points per game	**Bold**	Career high

=== BAL ===
Year	Team	GP	GS	MPG	FG%	3P%	FT%	RPG	APG	SPG	BPG	PPG
2022	Cape Town	6	6	**31.1**	.313	**.333**	.714	**5.5**	2.0	**.8**	**1.5**	10.7
2023	Cape Town	6	6	30.1	**.357**	.294	**.810**	4.5	**2.2**	.3	1.0	**11.2**
