= Basketball South Africa =

Sports governing body in South Africa

Basketball South Africa BSA
- IOC nation: RSA
- Sport: Basketball
- Official website: basketball.org.za

HISTORY
- Year of formation: 1992; 34 years ago

AFFILIATIONS
- International federation: International Basketball Federation (FIBA)
- Continental association: FIBA Africa

ELECTED
- President: Mr S Mthiyane
- Address: Wembley Sports Complex 106 Turffontein Rd, Turffontein, Johannesburg
- Country: South Africa

Basketball South Africa (BSA) is the governing body for men's and women's basketball in South Africa, and is responsible for the administration of the South African national basketball teams (both men's and women's), BSA has been an affiliate of FIBA Africa since 1992 and its offices are located in Johannesburg. The president is Sanele Mthiyane.

BSA was admitted to FIBA in 1992, and its senior team has since competed at the AfroBasket but has yet to qualify for the FIBA World Cup. The Basketball National League administers the elite men's professional game. BSA is registered with SASCOC as the officially recognised basketball federation.

The President of Basketball South Africa is Mr. Sanele Mthiyane.

== History ==
The Basketball Federation of South Africa (BFSA) was founded in 1953. During the time, women were encouraged to play in the similar but different sport of netball. BFSA was expelled from international tournaments in 1980 by the world governing body International Amateur Basketball Federation (FIBA) in opposition towards the racial policies of the government of South Africa, the voting was 49 in favour with 2 against, and 10 abstentions. BFSA had earlier been under suspension since 1977. In 1992, all the racially divided basketball organisations namely – Basketball Federation of South Africa (BFSA) for whites, Midlands Basketball Union (MBU) for coloureds and indians, with the South African Basketball Association (SABA) for blacks were united under the auspices of an interim body called Basketball Union of South Africa (BUSA) that had four members from each organisation, which led to the establishment of Basketball South Africa, and ultimately being readmitted to FIBA.

In 2015, the American NBA held an exhibition game in Johannesburg known as the NBA Africa Game in an attempt to popularise the game further. Tickets were quickly sold out although local games receive less attendances. The game involved an all-star Team Africa vs Team World. The NBA held another instalment of the all-star game in 2017.

== National teams ==
=== Men ===
- South Africa national basketball team
- South Africa national under-19 basketball team
- South Africa national under-17 basketball team

=== Women ===
- South Africa women's national basketball team
- South Africa women's national under-19 basketball team
- South Africa women's national under-17 basketball team

== Logo ==
Former logo

Current logo

== See also ==
- Sport in South Africa
- Basketball National League
- Basketball in Africa
- FIBA Africa
