= KwaZulu Marlins =

- League: BNL
- Founded: 1994
- History: KwaZulu Marlins (1994–present)
- Location: Durban, KwaZulu-Natal, South Africa
- Team colours: Blue, Purple and Grey
- Chairman: George Fletcher
- Head coach: Graig Gilchrist
- Championships: 2 (1997, 2024)

The KwaZulu Marlins are a South African basketball team based in Durban, KwaZulu-Natal. Established in 1994, the Marlins play in the Basketball National League (BNL).

The Marlins won the Premier Basketball League in 1997 and the BNL in 2024, and were runners-up in 2007. The team is coached by Graig Gilchrist since 2013. Notable former players include Samkelo Cele and Thabo Sithole.

== Honours ==
Premier Basketball League / Basketball National League

- Champions (2): 1997, 2024
  - Runners-up (1): 2007
    - Semi-finalist (4): 2013, 2018, 2021, 2023

== Head coaches ==
- (South Africa) Graig Gilchrist: (2013–present)
