= Limpopo Pride =

- Leagues: Basketball National League
- Founded: 1993
- Location: Limpopo, South Africa
- Website: Official website

Limpopo Pride is a South African professional basketball team located in Limpopo, South Africa. The team competes in the Basketball National League.

== Notable players ==
To appear in this section a player must have either:

- Set a club record or won an individual award as a professional player.
- Played at least one official international match for his senior national team or one NBA game at any time.

- (South Africa) Shane Marhanele
- (South Africa) Thuso Moiloa
