= Tshwane Suns =

- Leagues: Basketball National League
- Founded: 1996
- History: Tshwane Suns; 1996–present
- Arena: Wembley Stadium
- Capacity: 3,000
- Location: Tshwane, South Africa
- Team colors: Red, Black, White
- President: Dion Karagiannis
- Head coach: Terry Nxumalo
- Championships: 4 (2013, 2014, 2017, 2022)
- Website: Official website
Home	Away

Tshwane Suns is a basketball team located in Tshwane, South Africa. The team competes in South Africa's highest division, the Basketball National League (BNL). Founded in 1996, they have won the BNL championship four times, in 2013, 2014, 2017 and 2022.

== Arena ==
Like all other teams in the Basketball National League, the Suns play their games at the Wembley Stadium, in Stafford, Gauteng, City of Johannesburg Metropolitan Municipality, a former ice rink which holds up to 3,000 visitors.

== Notable players ==
- Set a club record or won an individual award as a professional player.
- Played at least one official international match for his senior national team at any time.

- (South Africa) Lehlogonolo Tholo
- (South Africa) Kagiso Ngoetjana
- (United States) Larry Jackson
- (South Africa) (Serbia) Nikola Jokanović

== Head coach position ==
- (South Africa) (Serbia) Nikola Jokanović (2006)
- (South Africa) George Makena (2006–2017)
- (Greece) Giannis Grapsas - 2019
- (South Africa) Terry Nxumalo (2020)
