= Basketball National League =

- Founded: 1993; 33 years ago (as Premier Basketball League)
- First season: 1993–94
- Country: South Africa
- Number of teams: 12
- Level on pyramid: 1
- Current champions: Soweto Panthers (3rd title) (2026)
- Most championships: Egoli Magic (6 titles)
- CEO: Albert Mokoena
- TV partners: SuperSport
- Website: bnlsa.com
- 2026 BNL season

The Basketball National League (BNL) is the pre-eminent male professional basketball league in South Africa. The league was founded in 2013, however, before the Premier Basketball League had been running as the country's premier basketball league.

The league also has a female counterpart, the Women's Basketball National League, which was established in 2021.

Egoli Magic are the most successful club in league history, having won five championships.

== History ==
=== PBL era ===
Founded in 1994 as the Premier Basketball League (PBL), the league was founded by six franchises. In an agreement with the national federation Basketball South Africa, the league began with four new teams, namely Capetown Eagles, Soweto Panthers, Capetown Kings and Pretoria Suns.

The leaguge was sponsored by Allied Bank, and later by Telkom. The PBL was disbanded in 1996.

The PBL disappeared for the following years, but made a return after nine years in 2007. The final of that season was won by the Soweto Panthers.

=== BNL era ===
After a 14-year period without a national men's league, the Basketball National League (BNL) was founded in 2013. The Tshwane Suns won the inaugural BNL championship.

The BNL Season of 2018 started in August, the 3rd and ended on October, the 27th. For the first time ever, the championship was won by the Soweto Panthers.

In 2016 the league piloted a women's division in Gauteng, The Sturdy Stars won the title that year.

South Africa saw the official nationwide launch of the Women's Basketball National League (WBNL) in 2021, with the participating club expansion the W-Tshwane Suns won their first national championship on the 27 November 2021.

Because of the scarcity of available basketball arenas, all games between 2013 and 2015 were played at Wembley Stadium in Stafford, Gauteng, City of Johannesburg Metropolitan Municipality, a former ice-rink which holds up to 3,000 visitors.

The league expanded to 12 clubs in the 2023 season, when the Cape Town Tigers, joined the league. The Tigers had already played in two seasons of the Basketball Africa League (BAL), the continent's most important tournament. The Tigers won the league in their debut season, after going unbeaten.

The defending champions Tigers withdrew for the sequential 2024 season because of budgetary constraints. Meanwhile, a promotion and relegation was introduced and last-ranked Eastern Cape Windbreakers were relegated, while MBB from the Inner City Super League (ICSL) joined the league.

== Current clubs ==
The league currently has 11 clubs:

Team	Location	Founded	Joined
Egoli Magic	Johannesburg, Gauteng	1994	
Free State Warriors	Free State	2012	
KwaZulu Marlins	Durban, KwaZulu-Natal	1994	
Limpopo Pride	Limpopo	2012	
MBB	Johannesburg, Gauteng	2012	2024
Mpumalanga Rhinos (Note: Named the "Mbombela Wildcats" from 2013 to 2014.)	Mbombela, Mpumalanga	2012	
Northern Cape Zebras (Note: Named "Kimberley Diamonds" from 2013 to 2014.)	Northern Cape	2012	
North West Eagles (Note: Named "North West Goodfellas" from 2013 to 2014.)	Potchefstroom, North West	2012	
Soweto Panthers	Soweto, Gauteng	1986	1994
Tshwane Suns	Tswhane, Gauteng	1996	
Western Cape Mountaineers	Cape Town, Western Cape	2013	

=== Former teams ===
Team	Location	Founded	Joined	Last season
Cape Town Tigers	Cape Town	2019	2023	
Eastern Cape Windbreakers	Eastern Cape	2012		2023

== List of champions ==
Season	Champions	Runners-up	Finals score	Venue	Ref.
1997	KwaZulu Marlins				
1998–2006	Inactive				
2007	Soweto Panthers	KwaZulu Marlins	79–78	Mandeville Indoor Center, Johannesburg	
2008–2012	Inactive				
2013	Tshwane Suns	Mbombela Wildcats	79–68	Wembley Stadium, Johannesburg	
2014	Tshwane Suns (2)	Duzi Royals	65–60	Wembley Stadium, Johannesburg	
2015	Egoli Magic	Duzi Royals	2–1 (series)	Wembley Stadium, Johannesburg	
2016	Egoli Magic (2)	Tshwane Suns	62–47	Wembley Stadium, Johannesburg	
2017	Tshwane Suns (3)	Egoli Magic	58–51	Wembley Stadium, Johannesburg	
2018	Soweto Panthers (2)	Egoli Magic	84–58	Wembley Stadium, Johannesburg	
2019	Egoli Magic (3)	Soweto Panthers	59–55	Wembley Stadium, Johannesburg	
2020–21	Egoli Magic (4)	Soweto Panthers	85–67	Wembley Stadium, Johannesburg	
2021	Egoli Magic (5)	Tshwane Suns	53–39	Wembley Stadium, Johannesburg	
2022	Tshwane Suns (4)	Western Cape Mountaineers	66–62	Wembley Stadium, Johannesburg	
2023	Cape Town Tigers	Tshwane Suns	85–60	Mandeville Indoor Center, Johannesburg	
2024	KwaZulu Marlins	Mpumalanga Rhinos	2–0 (series)	Mandeville Indoor Center, Johannesburg	
2025	Egoli Magic (6)	Tshwane Suns	2–0 (series)	Mandeville Indoor Center, Johannesburg	
2026	Soweto Panthers (3)	Western Cape Mountaineers	2–0 (series)	Mandeville Indoor Center, Johannesburg	

== Performance by team ==
Club	Winners	Runners-up	Years won	Years runner-up
Egoli Magic	6	2	2015, 2016, 2019, 2020–21, 2021, 2025	2017, 2018
Tshwane Suns	4	4	2013, 2014, 2017, 2022	2016, 2021, 2023, 2025
Soweto Panthers	3	2	2007, 2018, 2026	2019, 2020–21
KwaZulu Marlins	2	1	1997, 2024	2007
Cape Town Tigers	1	—	2023	—
Duzi Royals	—	2	—	2014, 2015
Mpumalanga Rhinos (Note: Named the "Mbombela Wildcats" from 2013 to 2014.)	—	2	—	2013, 2025
Western Cape Mountaineers	—	2	—	2022, 2026

== Individual awards ==
=== MVP and Final MVP ===
Season	MVP	Final MVP	Ref.
2007		Neo Mothiba (Panthers)	
2013		Neo Mothiba (Suns)	
2014	(South Africa) Tichifara Mabiza (Suns)		
2015	(Angola) Jose Salvador (Egoli)		
2017	(South Africa) Stephen Gabriel (Suns)		
2018	(Zimbabwe) Tatenda Maturure (Soweto)		
2019	(South Africa) Bandile Nsele (Egoli)		
2020–21	(Portugal) Miguel Ferrão (Egoli)	(South Africa) Lehlogonolo Tholo (Soweto)	
2021	(Democratic Republic of the Congo) Emmanuel Shine (Suns)	(South Africa) Nkosinathi Sibanyoni (Suns)	
2022	(Democratic Republic of the Congo) Emmanuel Shine (Suns)	(South Africa) Kagiso Ngoetjana (Suns)	
2023	(Democratic Republic of the Congo) Emmanuel Shine (Suns)	(South Africa) Nkosinathi Sibanyoni (Tigers)	
2024	(South Africa) Sifiso Gininda (Marlins)	(South Africa) Sifiso Gininda (Marlins)	
2025	(Democratic Republic of the Congo) Yanick Kasilembo (Magic)		
2026	(Democratic Republic of the Congo) Emmanuel Shine (Suns)		

== See also ==
- Basketball South Africa
- South African National Basketball Championship
