= Jozi Nuggets =

- Nickname: Bluecollar Gold Swagger
- Leagues: Johannesburg Basketball League
- Founded: 2008
- History: Jozi Nuggets (1998–present)
- Arena: Walter Sisulu Hall, Johannesburg
- Capacity: 1,200
- Location: Johannesburg, South Africa
- Team colors: Navy Blue and Yellow
- Main sponsor: National Lottery Commission, City of Joburg
- Head coach: Andile Hlophe
- Team captain: VACANT (Men); SIPHIWE CHITLANGO (Women)
- Ownership: Andile Hlophe
- Championships: 1 South African championship 2 Johannesburg Basketball Leagues
- Website: www.jozinuggets.co.za

Jozi Nuggets is a South African basketball club based in Johannesburg. The team plays in the Johannesburg Basketball League (JBL), in which it won championships in 2017 and 2018. The men's won the National Club Championship in 2019. Runner up in 2021 and 2022. The Club came 3rd in 2024. the ladies team won the BSA National Championships in 2021 and got 2nd position in 2024.

The club’s develops its own players from age 10 and some are playing for the senior men’s and women’s team. The club has partnered with the City of Joburg for programs including development of young players within the inner city and surrounding areas. The club was founded in 1998 and revived in 2008. The club has a men’s, women’s and junior program and also has players representing the National Team of South Africa. the club runs a program called BAsketball Saving Lives which involves career guidance, mentorship and basketball skills development camps in schools around South Africa.

In 2019, the Nuggets represented South Africa in the qualifying tournaments for the Basketball Africa League (BAL). On 23 October 2019, Nuggets won its first game at the continental level when it beat Dolphins 68–60.

== Honours ==
=== Men's team ===
- National Club Championships
  - Winner (1): 2019, 2ND IN 2021 and 2022. 3rd in 2024
- Johannesburg Basketball League
  - Winners (2): 2017, 2018
- Swaziland Invitational Basketball Tournament
  - Winners (2): 2016, 2017
- Johannesburg Invitational Tournament
  - Winners: 2019
- Inner City Super League (shared record)
  - Winners (3): 2013, 2015, 2016
- Ashraf Lodewyk Memorial Tournament
  - Winners (3): 2014, 2015, 2016

=== Women's team ===
- 2017 Silver medalists-Johannesburg Basketball League(JBL)
- 2018 Winner-JBL Women’s Tournament
- 2019 Winner-JBL Women’s Tournament
- 2019 Silver-Johannesburg Basketball League
- 2021 National Club Champs, 2022 2024 2nd
- 2024 Inner City Super League winner

== In African competitions ==
BAL Qualifiers (1 appearance)

2019 – first round

Swaziland Invitational Tournament

- 2012-Runners up
- 2013-Semi Finals
- 2014-Semi Finals
- 2015-Never invited
- 2016-Winner(Men)
- 2017-Winner(Men), Women(Quarter Finals)
- 2018-Quarter Finals(Women)
- 2019-Quarter Finals(Women)
