= Egoli Magic =

- Nickname: The Magicians
- League: Basketball National League
- Founded: 1994
- Location: Johannesburg, Gauteng, South Africa
- President: Svetlana Cabanelas
- Championships: 5 BNL championships
- Website: egolimagic.co.za
Home	Away

Egoli Magic is a South African basketball club based in Johannesburg. The team was established in 1994 and currently plays in the Basketball National League. The team is the most successful ever in the BNL, as it has won a record five championships, in 2015, 2016, 2019, 2020 and 2021.

== Honours ==
Basketball National League

- Champions (5): 2015, 2016, 2019, 2020, 2021

== Male Players ==
=== Individual awards ===
BNL MVP

- Jose Salvador – 2015
- Bandile Nsele – 2019
- Miguel Ferrão – 2020

BNL Final MVP

- Nkosinathi Sibanyoni – 2021

== Females Players ==
- Politeness Makwelantle
- Nqobile Thwala
- Liyabona Nondala
