= 2012 FIBA Africa Clubs Champions Cup squads =

This article displays the rosters for the participating teams at the 2012 FIBA Africa Club Championship.

== (Ivory Coast) Abidjan Basket Club ==
Abidjan Basket Club – 2012 FIBA Africa Clubs Champions Cup – 8th place roster
Players							Coaches
Pos	#	Nat	Name	Height	Weight	Age	Head Coach
G	4	(Ivory Coast)	Alassane Meite	1.84 m (6 ft 1/2 in)		21 September 1991 (aged 21)	(Ivory Coast) Seraphin Clement
G	5	(Ivory Coast)	Pierre Gbotto	1.83 m (6 ft 0 in)		18 August 1984 (aged 28)
F	6	(Ivory Coast)	Daouda Camara	1.92 m (6 ft 3 1/2 in)		29 December 1990 (aged 21)	Assistant coach(es)
G	7	(Ivory Coast)	Ange Kouakou	1.78 m (5 ft 10 in)		13 April 1985 (aged 27)	(Ivory Coast) Christian Coulibaly
G	8	(Ivory Coast)	Rene Agole	1.87 m (6 ft 1 1/2 in)		26 February 1984 (aged 28)
F	9	(Ivory Coast)	Eric Affi	1.96 m (6 ft 5 in)		1 January 1982 (aged 30)
C	10	(Ivory Coast)	Kouamé Abo	2.00 m (6 ft 6 1/2 in)		26 October 1985 (aged 27)
C	11	(Nigeria)	Dennis Ebikworo	2.07 m (6 ft 9 1/2 in)		30 August 1988 (aged 24)
PF	12	(Ivory Coast)	Asshe Kokoun	1.98 m (6 ft 6 in)		26 February 1984 (aged 28)
F	13	(Ivory Coast)	Blaise Amalabian	1.87 m (6 ft 1 1/2 in)		3 February 1974 (aged 38)
C	14	(Nigeria)	Kelechi Duru	2.04 m (6 ft 8 1/2 in)		20 December 1980 (aged 31)
G	15	(Ivory Coast)	Stéphane Konaté	1.92 m (6 ft 3 1/2 in)	80 kg (180 lb)	23 August 1980 (aged 32)

== (Egypt) Al Ahly ==
Al Ahly – 2012 FIBA Africa Clubs Champions Cup – Bronze Medal roster
Players							Coaches
Pos	#	Nat	Name	Height	Weight	Age	Head Coach
G	4	(Egypt)	Mohamed Housny	1.70 m (5 ft 7 in)		5 July 1986 (aged 26)	(Egypt) Tawfek Ashraf
G	5	(Egypt)	Karim Deif Allah	1.70 m (5 ft 7 in)		5 March 1986 (aged 26)
F	6	(Egypt)	Moustafa El Shafie	1.95 m (6 ft 5 in)		17 July 1984 (aged 28)	Assistant coach(es)
G	7	(Egypt)	Ibrahim Aboukhadra	1.90 m (6 ft 3 in)		17 July 1988 (aged 24)	(Egypt) Tawfek Ihab
G	8	(Egypt)	Haitham El Said	1.90 m (6 ft 3 in)		8 February 1975 (aged 37)
F	9	(Egypt)	Ibrahim El Gamal	1.90 m (6 ft 3 in)		23 March 1988 (aged 24)
C	10	(Egypt)	Tarek El Ghannam	2.08 m (6 ft 10 in)		6 October 1973 (aged 39)
C	11	(Egypt)	Mohamed Adlly	2.08 m (6 ft 10 in)		17 June 1987 (aged 25)
F	12	(Egypt)	Aly Islam	1.90 m (6 ft 3 in)		10 February 1978 (aged 34)
PF	13	(Egypt)	Karim Shamseia	1.95 m (6 ft 5 in)		16 March 1983 (aged 29)
PF	14	(Egypt)	Sherif Attia	2.06 m (6 ft 9 in)		12 May 1989 (aged 23)
G	15	(United States)	Darren Kelly	1.80 m (5 ft 11 in)		28 August 1978 (aged 34)

== (Egypt) Al-Ittihad Alexandria ==
Al-Ittihad Alexandria – 2012 FIBA Africa Clubs Champions Cup – 4th place roster
Players							Coaches
Pos	#	Nat	Name	Height	Weight	Age	Head Coach
G	4	(Egypt)	Mohamed El Sabagh	1.81 m (5 ft 11 1/2 in)		23 April 1988 (aged 24)	(Egypt) Mahmoud Emad
G	5	(Egypt)	Ziad Warda	1.85 m (6 ft 1 in)		28 October 1991 (aged 21)
C	6	(Egypt)	Haytham Khalifa	2.08 m (6 ft 10 in)		17 November 1987 (aged 25)	Assistant coach(es)
F	7	(Egypt)	Yasser Said	1.98 m (6 ft 6 in)		9 July 1982 (aged 30)
F	8	(Egypt)	Moamen El Emin	1.98 m (6 ft 6 in)		25 June 1986 (aged 26)
G	9	(Egypt)	Hatem Behiry	1.86 m (6 ft 1 in)		30 November 1992 (aged 20)
PF	10	(The Bahamas)	Torrington Cox	2.01 m (6 ft 7 in)		30 September 1985 (aged 27)
G	11	(Egypt)	Karim Said	1.92 m (6 ft 3 1/2 in)		14 September 1991 (aged 21)
G	12	(United States)	Kevin Burleson	1.91 m (6 ft 3 in)	93 kg (205 lb)	9 April 1979 (aged 33)
F	13	(Egypt)	Ahmed El Sabagh	1.90 m (6 ft 3 in)		26 May 1989 (aged 23)
PF	14	(Egypt)	Ramy Ibrahim	2.05 m (6 ft 8 1/2 in)		6 February 1988 (aged 24)
C	15	(Egypt)	Ashraf Rabie	2.07 m (6 ft 9 1/2 in)		16 January 1983 (aged 29)

== (Democratic Republic of the Congo) ASB Mazembe ==
ASB Mazembe – 2012 FIBA Africa Clubs Champions Cup – 11th place roster
Players							Coaches
Pos	#	Nat	Name	Height	Weight	Age	Head Coach
G	4	(Democratic Republic of the Congo)	Tshibangu Ilunga	1.65 m (5 ft 5 in)			(Democratic Republic of the Congo) Tshimbamgu Simplice
G	5	(Democratic Republic of the Congo)	Jonhnny Mualaba	1.82 m (5 ft 11 1/2 in)
F	6	(Democratic Republic of the Congo)	Doudou Tshumanga	1.82 m (5 ft 11 1/2 in)			Assistant coach(es)
F	7	(Democratic Republic of the Congo)	Tshimanga Kabangu	1.84 m (6 ft 1/2 in)			(Democratic Republic of the Congo) Kukunde Shamwange
G	8	(Democratic Republic of the Congo)	Kamtu Kubala	1.95 m (6 ft 5 in)
F	9	(Republic of the Congo)	Bertrand Dibessa	1.98 m (6 ft 6 in)		6 March 1981 (aged 31)
PF	10	(Democratic Republic of the Congo)	Junior Kasongo	1.98 m (6 ft 6 in)
F	11	(Democratic Republic of the Congo)	Katumbayi Tshibangu	1.93 m (6 ft 4 in)
PF	12	(Democratic Republic of the Congo)	Patient Peni	1.98 m (6 ft 6 in)
C	13	(Democratic Republic of the Congo)	Mamga Kambuyi	2.07 m (6 ft 9 1/2 in)
C	14	(Democratic Republic of the Congo)	Prince Ngongo	2.03 m (6 ft 8 in)
C	15	(Democratic Republic of the Congo)	Sheba Tshishimbi	1.98 m (6 ft 6 in)

== (Tunisia) Étoile Sportive du Sahel ==
Étoile Sportive du Sahel – 2012 FIBA Africa Clubs Champions Cup – 6th place roster
Players							Coaches
Pos	#	Nat	Name	Height	Weight	Age	Head Coach
PF	4	(Tunisia)	Moez Mestiri	1.98 m (6 ft 6 in)		6 April 1983 (aged 29)	(Cyprus) Pantelis Gavriel
G	5	(Tunisia)	Marouen Lahmar	1.85 m (6 ft 1 in)	89 kg (196 lb)	7 February 1982 (aged 30)
G	6	(Tunisia)	Brahim Nadderi	1.80 m (5 ft 11 in)		1 October 1982 (aged 30)	Assistant coach(es)
C	7	(Tunisia)	Aymen Bouzid	2.07 m (6 ft 9 1/2 in)		16 August 1987 (aged 25)	(Egypt) Hattab Nebil
G	8	(Tunisia)	Omar Mouhli	1.90 m (6 ft 3 in)		19 March 1986 (aged 26)
PF	9	(Tunisia)	Ben Romdhane	2.04 m (6 ft 8 1/2 in)	107 kg (236 lb)	27 March 1989 (aged 23)
PF	10	(Tunisia)	Zied Chennoufi	2.02 m (6 ft 7 1/2 in)		29 November 1988 (aged 24)
F	11	(United States)	Andre Smith	1.90 m (6 ft 3 in)		18 December 1980 (aged 31)
PF	12	(Tunisia)	Atef Maoua	2.00 m (6 ft 6 1/2 in)	98 kg (216 lb)	28 January 1981 (aged 31)
PF	13	(Tunisia)	Mohamed Hadidane	2.07 m (6 ft 9 1/2 in)		27 April 1986 (aged 26)
G	14	(Tunisia)	Zied Mahmoud Toumi	1.90 m (6 ft 3 in)		17 July 1985 (aged 27)
C	15	(Serbia)	Milan Vuvicević	2.05 m (6 ft 8 1/2 in)		20 July 1985 (aged 27)

== (Rwanda) Espoir Kigali ==
Espoir Kigali – 2012 FIBA Africa Clubs Champions Cup – 12th place roster
Players							Coaches
Pos	#	Nat	Name	Height	Weight	Age	Head Coach
	6	(Democratic Republic of the Congo)	Presta Nzuzi			2 October 1980 (aged 32)	Assistant coach(es)
	7	(Rwanda)	Olivier Muhuri
PG	8	(Rwanda)	Aristide Mugabe	1.83 m (6 ft 0 in)		11 February 1988 (aged 24)
PG	9	(Rwanda)	Aboubakar Barame	1.80 m (5 ft 11 in)		26 April 1984 (aged 28)
	10	(Rwanda)	Christophe Wazayira			16 May 1984 (aged 28)
	11	(Rwanda)	Pascal Karezeki
SF	12	(Rwanda)	Jean Louis Habineza	1.92 m (6 ft 3 1/2 in)		6 December 1983 (aged 29)
C	14	(Rwanda) (Democratic Republic of the Congo)	Kami Kabangu	2.03 m (6 ft 8 in)		2 July 1983 (aged 29)
	15	(Rwanda)	Bienvenue Mbanzi			28 August 1982 (aged 30)

== (Nigeria) Kano Pillars ==
Kano Pillars – 2012 FIBA Africa Clubs Champions Cup – 9th place roster
Players							Coaches
Pos	#	Nat	Name	Height	Weight	Age	Head Coach
G	4	(Nigeria)	Moses Daudu	1.96 m (6 ft 5 in)		13 January 1988 (aged 24)	(Nigeria) Sani Ahmed
G	5	(Nigeria)	Abubakar Yusuf	1.96 m (6 ft 5 in)		28 August 1988 (aged 24)
G	6	(Nigeria)	Ibrahim Yusuf	1.96 m (6 ft 5 in)		4 May 1989 (aged 23)	Assistant coach(es)
F	7	(Nigeria)	Abubakar Usman	1.94 m (6 ft 4 1/2 in)		5 July 1986 (aged 26)	(Nigeria) Abdul Maku
C	8	(Nigeria)	Mathew Onmonya	1.98 m (6 ft 6 in)		29 November 1986 (aged 26)
F	9	(Nigeria)	Kevin Ninmol	2.02 m (6 ft 7 1/2 in)		9 November 1985 (aged 27)
F	10	(Nigeria)	Manasseh Achi	1.98 m (6 ft 6 in)		9 July 1992 (aged 20)
F	11	(Nigeria)	Baba Mohammed	2.00 m (6 ft 6 1/2 in)		31 October 1992 (aged 20)
C	12	(Nigeria)	Mustapha Yusuf	2.01 m (6 ft 7 in)		7 June 1986 (aged 26)
F	13	(Nigeria)	Stanley Gumut	2.00 m (6 ft 6 1/2 in)	95 kg (209 lb)	21 February 1986 (aged 26)
F	14	(Nigeria)	Daniel Ademola	2.00 m (6 ft 6 1/2 in)		11 January 1979 (aged 33)
C	15	(Nigeria)	Onyenka Okeke	2.02 m (6 ft 7 1/2 in)		7 September 1988 (aged 24)

== (Gabon) Manga BB ==
Manga BB – 2012 FIBA Africa Clubs Champions Cup – 7th place roster
Players							Coaches
Pos	#	Nat	Name	Height	Weight	Age	Head Coach
F	4	(Gabon)	Freddy Obame	1.98 m (6 ft 6 in)		6 April 1986 (aged 26)	(Cameroon) Hervé Ibama
F	5	(Gabon)	Rodrigue Moukagha	1.78 m (5 ft 10 in)		5 November 1992 (aged 20)
C	6	(Central African Republic)	Jean Michel Kouzou	2.05 m (6 ft 8 1/2 in)		6 May 1985 (aged 27)	Assistant coach(es)
C	7	(Republic of the Congo)	Raymond Koumen	2.00 m (6 ft 6 1/2 in)		20 July 1985 (aged 27)	Mavoungou Bayonne
F	8	(Gabon)	Fabien Bissielou	1.96 m (6 ft 5 in)		31 August 1982 (aged 30)
G	9	(Gabon)	Serge Moussounda	1.87 m (6 ft 1 1/2 in)		9 February 1980 (aged 32)
F	10	(Gabon)	Steve Madama	1.91 m (6 ft 3 in)		20 March 1984 (aged 28)
G	11	(Gabon)	Aymard Boundou	1.84 m (6 ft 1/2 in)		11 November 1982 (aged 30)
C	12	(Gabon)	Jason Reteno	2.03 m (6 ft 8 in)		8 October 1977 (aged 35)
G	13	(Gabon)	Jacques Digondi	1.92 m (6 ft 3 1/2 in)		3 March 1990 (aged 22)
C	14	(Gabon)	Azize Boungouere	2.00 m (6 ft 6 1/2 in)		9 February 1982 (aged 30)
F	15	(Gabon)	Darliss Ombnago	2.00 m (6 ft 6 1/2 in)		25 May 1988 (aged 24)

== (Equatorial Guinea) Mongomo BC ==
Mongomo Basket Club – 2012 FIBA Africa Clubs Champions Cup – 10th place roster
Players							Coaches
Pos	#	Nat	Name	Height	Weight	Age	Head Coach
	4	(Equatorial Guinea)	Sergio Ndemensogo
	6	(Equatorial Guinea)	Evariste Songanya				Assistant coach(es)
	7	(Equatorial Guinea)	Crispin Ondo
	8	(Equatorial Guinea)	Diego Elolo
G	9	(Spain)	Angel Manana	1.86 m (6 ft 1 in)
	10	(Equatorial Guinea)	Walterio Esono
	12	(Equatorial Guinea)	Josemanuel Enzerman
	13	(Equatorial Guinea)	Santiago Obiang
C	14	(United States)	Chris McGrew	2.06 m (6 ft 9 in)
G	15	(Spain)	Miguel Montañana	2.06 m (6 ft 9 in)

== (Angola) Petro Atlético ==
Petro Atlético – 2012 FIBA Africa Clubs Champions Cup – Silver Medal roster
Players							Coaches
Pos	#	Nat	Name	Height	Weight	Age	Head Coach
G	4	(Angola)	Pedro Bastos			8 January 1993 (aged 19)	(United States) (Cameroon) Lazare Adingono
PG	5	(Angola)	Bráulio Morais	1.90 m (6 ft 3 in)	88 kg (194 lb)	17 December 1990 (aged 21)
SG	6	(Angola)	Carlos Morais	1.93 m (6 ft 4 in)	91 kg (201 lb)	16 October 1985 (aged 27)	Assistant coach(es)
C	7	(Angola)	Hermenegildo Mbunga	2.06 m (6 ft 9 in)	109 kg (240 lb)	4 September 1985 (aged 27)	(Angola) Manuel Silva (Gi)
SF	8	(United States)	Keith Cothran	1.93 m (6 ft 4 in)		20 March 1986 (aged 26)	(Angola) Victor de Carvalho
F	9	(Angola)	Paulo Barros	1.95 m (6 ft 5 in)		13 March 1989 (aged 23)
PG	10	(Canada) (Angola)	Paulo Santana	1.85 m (6 ft 1 in)	77 kg (170 lb)	28 April 1984 (aged 28)
C	11	(Angola)	Miguel Kiala	2.04 m (6 ft 8 1/2 in)	91 kg (201 lb)	10 November 1990 (aged 22)
SF	12	(Angola)	Eric Norman			19 October 1985 (aged 27)
PF	13	(Angola)	Leonel Paulo	1.97 m (6 ft 5 1/2 in)	114 kg (251 lb)	30 April 1986 (aged 26)
SG	14	(Cameroon)	Parfait Bitee	1.88 m (6 ft 2 in)	91 kg (201 lb)	23 July 1985 (aged 27)
C	15	(Angola)	Abdel Gomes	2.03 m (6 ft 8 in)		21 May 1989 (aged 23)

== (Angola) Primeiro de Agosto ==
Primeiro de Agosto – 2012 FIBA Africa Clubs Champions Cup – Gold Medal roster
Players							Coaches
Pos	#	Nat	Name	Height	Weight	Age	Head Coach
PG	4	(Angola)	Hermenegildo Santos	1.80 m (5 ft 11 in)		16 August 1990 (aged 22)	(Angola) Paulo Macedo
PG	5	(Angola)	Armando Costa	1.92 m (6 ft 3 1/2 in)	91 kg (201 lb)	3 June 1983 (aged 29)
PG	6	(Angola)	Adilson Baza	1.85 m (6 ft 1 in)		25 April 1986 (aged 26)	Assistant coach(es)
SF	7	(Angola)	Islando Manuel	1.92 m (6 ft 3 1/2 in)		7 January 1991 (aged 21)	(Angola) Walter Costa
PF	8	(Angola) (United States)	Reggie Moore	1.98 m (6 ft 6 in)	107 kg (236 lb)	31 March 1981 (aged 31)
C	9	(Angola)	Felizardo Ambrósio	2.02 m (6 ft 7 1/2 in)	97 kg (214 lb)	25 December 1987 (aged 24)
C	10	(Angola)	Joaquim Gomes	2.00 m (6 ft 6 1/2 in)	100 kg (220 lb)	23 December 1980 (aged 31)
C	11	(Angola)	Francisco Machado	2.05 m (6 ft 8 1/2 in)		23 February 1981 (aged 31)
SG	12	(Rwanda) (United States)	Cedric Isom	1.88 m (6 ft 2 in)	88 kg (194 lb)	6 June 1984 (aged 28)
F	13	(Angola)	Carlos Almeida	1.93 m (6 ft 4 in)	91 kg (201 lb)	24 September 1976 (aged 36)
PG	14	(Angola)	Miguel Lutonda	1.86 m (6 ft 1 in)	78 kg (172 lb)	24 December 1971 (aged 40)
PF	15	(Angola)	Agostinho Coelho	1.95 m (6 ft 5 in)		21 January 1990 (aged 22)

== (Angola) Recreativo do Libolo ==
Recreativo do Libolo – 2012 FIBA Africa Clubs Champions Cup – 5th place roster
Players							Coaches
Pos	#	Nat	Name	Height	Weight	Age	Head Coach
F	4	(Angola)	Olímpio Cipriano	1.94 m (6 ft 4 1/2 in)	93 kg (205 lb)	9 April 1982 (aged 30)	(Portugal) Luís Magalhães
F	5	(Angola)	Luis Costa	1.94 m (6 ft 4 1/2 in)	93 kg (205 lb)	7 June 1978 (aged 34)
G	6	(Angola)	Francisco Sousa	1.84 m (6 ft 1/2 in)		30 May 1982 (aged 30)	Assistant coach(es)
F	7	(Angola)	Edson Ndoniema	1.94 m (6 ft 4 1/2 in)		11 February 1991 (aged 21)	(Angola) Ricardo Rodrigues
G	8	(Angola)	Edson Ferreira	1.84 m (6 ft 1/2 in)		7 August 1985 (aged 27)
G	9	(Angola)	Mayzer Alexandre	1.84 m (6 ft 1/2 in)		29 June 1984 (aged 28)
PF	10	(Angola)	Vladimir Ricardino	1.98 m (6 ft 6 in)	93 kg (205 lb)	4 October 1978 (aged 34)
G	11	(Angola)	Domingos Bonifácio	1.84 m (6 ft 1/2 in)	76 kg (168 lb)	28 October 1984 (aged 28)
C	12	(Angola) (Chad)	Abdel Bouckar	2.02 m (6 ft 7 1/2 in)	109 kg (240 lb)	8 April 1980 (aged 32)
PF	13	(United States)	Tommie Eddie	1.98 m (6 ft 6 in)		7 September 1982 (aged 30)
C	14	(Mali)	Mohamed Tangara	2.08 m (6 ft 10 in)		11 August 1984 (aged 28)
C	15	(Angola)	Mutu Fonseca	2.02 m (6 ft 7 1/2 in)		9 September 1989 (aged 23)
