= 2012 FIBA Africa Clubs Champions Cup =

- Official tournament logo.
- Season: 2012
- Dates: November 29 – December 8
- Teams: 12

Regular season
- Season MVP: (Angola) Carlos Morais

Finals
- Champions: (Angola) 1º Agosto (7th title)
- Runners-up: (Angola) Petro de Luanda
- Third place: (Egypt) Al Ahly
- Fourth place: (Egypt) Al-Ittihad

Statistical leaders
Points	(Angola) Carlos Morais	21.4

The 2012 FIBA Africa Basketball Club Championship (27th edition), is an international basketball tournament held in Malabo, Equatorial Guinea, from 29 November to 8 December 2012. The tournament, organized by FIBA Africa and hosted by Mongomo, was contested by 12 clubs split into 2 groups of six, the top four of which qualifying for the knock-out stage, quarter-finals, semifinals and final.

Primeiro de Agosto from Angola was the winner.

== Qualification ==
Teams in bold qualified for the 2012 season.

=== Zone 1 ===
The Zone 1 games were played from 6 to 11 November 2012 in Sousse, Tunisia.

Rang	Equipe	GP	W	L	PF	PA	Points
**1.**	**(Tunisia) Étoile du Sahel**	**4**	**3**	**1**	**305**	**242**	**7**
**2.**	**(Egypt) Al Ittihad Alexandria**	**4**	**3**	**1**	**310**	**304**	**7**
3.	(Egypt) Al Ahly	4	2	2	275	291	6
4.	(Tunisia) Club Africain	4	2	2	307	303	6
5.	(Libya) Al Ahli Benghazi	4	0	4	266	324	4

=== Zone 3 ===
The Zone 3 games were played from 2 September to 9 September 2012.

No.	Club	GP	W	L	PF	PA	Points
**1.**	**(Nigeria) Kano Pillars**	**6**	**5**	**1**	**476**	**311**	**11**
**2.**	**(Ivory Coast) ABC**	**6**	**5**	**1**	**433**	**324**	**11**
3.	(Liberia) Uhuru Kings	6	1	5	336	488	7
4.	(Liberia) LPRC Oilers	6	1	5	378	499	7

=== Zone 4 ===
Zone 4 games were played from 23 June to 29 June 2012.

No.	Club	GP	W	L	PF	PA	Pts
1.	**(Democratic Republic of the Congo) Mazembe**	**5**	**5**	**0**	**323**	**276**	**10**
2.	**(Gabon) Manga**	**5**	**3**	**2**	**293**	**290**	**8**
3.	(Democratic Republic of the Congo) Molokai	5	3	2	297	289	8
4.	(Gabon) Somo	5	3	2	261	246	8
5.	(Republic of the Congo) Inter Club	5	1	4	280	302	6
6.	(Republic of the Congo) Avenir du Rail	5	0	5	271	322	5

=== Zone 5 ===
The Zone 5 games were played from 20 to 26 August 2012 in Kampala, Uganda. The final standings were as follows:

No.	Club
**1.**	**(Rwanda) Espoir**
2.	(Burundi) Urunani
3.	(Uganda) Dmark Power
4.	(Kenya) KCB
5.	(Uganda) Kyambogo Warriors
6.	(Tanzania) Savio
7.	(Tanzania) ABC
8.	(Sudan) El Hilal

=== Zone 6 ===
The Zone 6 games were played from 1 to 7 October 2012 in Maputo, Mozambique.

No.	Club	GP	W	L	PF	PA	Pts
**1.**	**(Angola) Primeiro de Agosto**	**6**	**6**	**0**	**540**	**291**	**12**
**2.**	**(Angola) Petro de Luanda**	**6**	**5**	**1**	**511**	**301**	**11**
**3.**	**(Angola) Recreativo do Libolo**	**6**	**4**	**2**	**455**	**295**	**10**
4.	(Mozambique) Ferroviário de Maputo	6	3	3	325	304	9
5.	(Zambia) Matero Magic	6	2	4	280	409	8
6.	(Botswana) Spartans	6	1	5	259	525	7
7.	(Zambia) Heroes Play United	6	0	6	283	528	6

== Draw ==
Group A	Group B
(Ivory Coast) Abidjan Basket Club (Egypt) Al-Ittihad (Rwanda) Espoir Kigali (Gabon) Manga (Equatorial Guinea) Mongomo (Angola) Recreativo do Libolo	(Egypt) Al Ahly (Democratic Republic of the Congo) ASB Mazembe (Tunisia) ES du Sahel (Nigeria) Kano Pillars (Angola) Petro Atlético (Angola) Primeiro de Agosto

== Preliminary round ==
Times given below are in UTC+1.

=== Group A ===
Qualified for the quarter-finals

	Team	M	W	L	PF	PA	Diff	P
1.	(Angola) Recreativo do Libolo	5	5	0	391	334	+57	10
2.	(Egypt) Al-Ittihad	5	4	1	381	346	+35	8
3.	(Ivory Coast) Abidjan Basket Club	5	4	1	348	322	+26	8
4.	(Gabon) Manga BB	5	2	3	304	312	-8	4
5.	(Equatorial Guinea) Mongomo BC	5	1	4	303	354	−51	2
6.	(Rwanda) Espoir Kigali	5	0	5	301	360	−59	0

November 29, 2012
10:30

Boxscore

Al-Ittihad (Egypt)	74–61	(Gabon) Manga BB
Scoring by quarter: 24-16, 20-10, 20-16, 10-19
Pts: Burleson 15; Rebs: three players 6 Asts: three players 2		Pts: Bissielou 17; Rebs: Obame, Digondi 6 Asts: three players 2

Malabo

November 29, 2012
12:30

Boxscore

Rec Libolo (Angola)	78–62	(Ivory Coast) Abidjan BC
Scoring by quarter: 16-9, 16-20, 23-16, 23-17
Pts: Olímpio 19; Rebs: Ricardino 7 Asts: Olímpio 4		Pts: S.Konaté 20; Rebs: S.Konaté, Gbotto 4 Asts: Agole 3

Malabo

November 29, 2012
19:30

Boxscore

Mongomo BC (Equatorial Guinea)	70–68	(Rwanda) Espoir Kigali
Scoring by quarter: 17-20, 13-19, 23-14, 17-15
Pts: Elolo 19; Rebs: Montañana 10; Asts: Songanya 4		Pts: Kabangu 19; Rebs: Nzuzi 5 Asts: Nzuzi 4

Malabo

November 30, 2012
11:00

Boxscore

Espoir Kigali (Rwanda)	48–58	(Ivory Coast) Abidjan BC
Scoring by quarter: 19-24, 5-4, 15-14, 9-16
Pts: Habineza 19; Rebs: Mbanzi 10; Asts: Mugabe, Barame 1		Pts: S.Konaté 18; Rebs: S.Konaté 10; Asts: Affi 2

Malabo

November 30, 2012
17:00

Boxscore

Al-Ittihad (Egypt)	74–77	(Angola) Rec do Libolo
Scoring by quarter: 18-15, 14-22, 18-18, 24-22
Pts: Ibrahim 19; Rebs: El Emin 5 Asts: three players 2		Pts: Eddie 33; Rebs: Tangara 9 Asts: Ricardino, F.Sousa 2

Malabo

November 30, 2012
19:00

Boxscore

Mongomo BC (Equatorial Guinea)	58–65	(Gabon) Manga BB
Scoring by quarter: 17-14, 11-11, 17-21, 13-19
Pts: Montañana, Elolo 15; Rebs: Montañana 11; Asts: Montañana, Manana 3		Pts: Ombnago 15; Rebs: Kouzou 10; Asts: Moussounda, Madama 3

Malabo

December 1, 2012
11:00

Boxscore

Manga BB (Gabon)	65–73	(Angola) Rec do Libolo
Scoring by quarter: 17-20, 9-16, 13-18, 26-19
Pts: Ombnago 17; Rebs: Kouzou, Reteno 5 Asts: Moussounda 3		Pts: Eddie 16; Rebs: Mutu 11; Asts: Bonifácio, Ricardino 3

Malabo

December 1, 2012
19:00

Boxscore

Abidjan BC (Ivory Coast)	85–55	(Equatorial Guinea) Mongomo BC
Scoring by quarter: 12-9, 13-14, 30-17, 30-15
Pts: S.Konaté 27; Rebs: S.Konaté 10; Asts: Gbotto 5		Pts: Elolo 18; Rebs: McGrew 10; Asts: Manana 3

Malabo

December 1, 2012
21:00

Boxscore

Espoir Kigali (Rwanda)	64–77	(Egypt) Al-Ittihad
Scoring by quarter: 13-21, 23-14, 14-20, 14-22
Pts: Mbanzi 17; Rebs: Mbanzi, Kabangu 7 Asts: Barame 2		Pts: Cox 17; Rebs: Cox 9 Asts: Burleson 6

Malabo

December 3, 2012
15:00

[ Boxscore]

Manga BB (Gabon)	63–47	(Rwanda) Espoir Kigali
Scoring by quarter: 17-20, 9-16, 13-18, 26-19
Pts: n/a Rebs: n/a		Pts: n/a Rebs: n/a

Malabo

December 3, 2012
17:00

Boxscore

Abidjan BC (Ivory Coast)	83–91 (OT)	(Egypt) Al-Ittihad
Scoring by quarter: 22-26, 13-20, 16-18, 27-14, Overtime: 5-13
Pts: S.Konaté 25; Rebs: S.Konaté 10; Asts: Amalabian 4		Pts: Cox 17; Rebs: Cox 9 Asts: Burleson, Said 2

Malabo

December 3, 2012
19:00

Boxscore

Mongomo BC (Equatorial Guinea)	59–71	(Angola) Rec do Libolo
Scoring by quarter: 16-14, 15-22, 14-15, 14-20
Pts: Montañana 19; Rebs: Montañana 14; Asts: Manana 3		Pts: Olímpio 19; Rebs: three players 4 Asts: F.Sousa 3

Malabo

December 4, 2012
11:00

Boxscore

Rec do Libolo (Angola)	92–74	(Rwanda) Espoir Kigali
Scoring by quarter: 27-13, 14-22, 24-15, 27-24
Pts: Olímpio 23; Rebs: Tangara 8 Asts: Ndoniema, Ferreira 3		Pts: Habineza 15; Rebs: Muhuri 9 Asts: Mugabe 4

Malabo

December 4, 2012
19:00

[ Boxscore]

Al-Ittihad (Egypt)	65–61	(Equatorial Guinea) Mongomo BC
Scoring by quarter: n/a, n/a
Pts: n/a Rebs: n/a		Pts: n/a Rebs: n/a

Malabo

December 4, 2012
21:00

[ Boxscore]

Abidjan BC (Ivory Coast)	60–50	(Gabon) Manga BB
Scoring by quarter: n/a, n/a
Pts: n/a Rebs: n/a		Pts: n/a Rebs: n/a

Malabo

=== Group B ===
Qualified for the quarter-finals

	Team	M	W	L	PF	PA	Diff	P
1.	(Angola) Petro Atlético	5	5	0	402	349	+53	10
2.	(Angola) Primeiro de Agosto	5	4	1	411	338	+73	8
3.	(Tunisia) ES du Sahel	5	3	2	321	304	+17	6
4.	(Egypt) Al Ahly	5	1	4	302	348	-46	2
5.	(Nigeria) Kano Pillars	5	1	4	345	368	-23	2
6.	(Democratic Republic of the Congo) ASB Mazembe	5	1	4	311	385	-74	2

November 29, 2012
14:30

[ Boxscore]

ES du Sahel (Tunisia)	49–44	(Egypt) Al Ahly
Scoring by quarter: 12-11, 12-6, 13-12, 12-15
Pts: A.Smith 22; Rebs: B.Romdhane 13; Asts: B.Romdhane 2		Pts: Kelly 12; Rebs: El Ghannam 12; Asts: Kelly 4

Malabo

November 29, 2012
16:30

[ Boxscore]

1º de Agosto (Angola)	80–86	(Angola) Petro Atlético
Scoring by quarter: 13-27, 18-27, 22-11, 27-21
Pts: Moore 32; Rebs: Isom 7 Asts: Isom 6		Pts: Morais 26; Rebs: three players 3 Asts: Bitee 5

Malabo

November 29, 2012
21:30

Boxscore

Kano Pillars (Nigeria)	65–72	(Democratic Republic of the Congo) ASB Mazembe
Scoring by quarter: 18-17, 16-12, 16-21, 15-22
Pts: Usman 21; Rebs: Mohammed 6 Asts: Gumut 3		Pts: Kasongo 19; Rebs: Kasongo 12; Asts: Mualaba 4

Malabo

November 30, 2012
13:00

Boxscore

Kano Pillars (Nigeria)	70–78	(Angola) 1º de Agosto
Scoring by quarter: 19-18, 18-19, 22-26, 11-15
Pts: Gumut 22; Rebs: Mohammed 8 Asts: six players 1		Pts: Moore 21; Rebs: Ambrósio 6 Asts: Armando 7

Malabo

November 30, 2012
15:00

Boxscore Boxscore

ES du Sahel (Tunisia)	70–48	(Democratic Republic of the Congo) ASB Mazembe
Scoring by quarter: 14-14, 15-7, 20-14, 21-13
Pts: B.Romdhane, Toumi 15; Rebs: B.Romdhane 6 Asts: A.Smith 5		Pts: Dibessa 13; Rebs: Ngongo 11; Asts: Mualaba, Kubala 2

Malabo

November 30, 2012
21:00

Boxscore

Al Ahly (Egypt)	58–80	(Angola) Petro Atlético
Scoring by quarter: 19-23, 7-11, 16-26, 16-20
Pts: Islam 16; Rebs: El Ghannam 11; Asts: Aboukhadra 3		Pts: Morais 19; Rebs: Leonel 7 Asts: Bitee 3

Malabo

December 1, 2012
13:00

Boxscore

ASB Mazembe (Democratic Republic of the Congo)	63–88	(Angola) 1º de Agosto
Scoring by quarter: 19-19, 14-25, 17-25, 13-19
Pts: Kasongo 15; Rebs: Ngongo 19; Asts: Mualaba 3		Pts: Kikas 17; Rebs: Ambrósio 7 Asts: Isom 6

Malabo

December 1, 2012
15:00

[ Boxscore]

Al Ahly (Egypt)	68–70 (OT)	(Nigeria) Kano Pillars
Scoring by quarter: 14-15, 14-12, 12-20, 21-14, Overtime: 7-9
Pts: El Ghannam 17; Rebs: El Ghannam 13; Asts: six players 2		Pts: Usman 22; Rebs: Gumut 7 Asts: Usman, Yusuf 3

Malabo

December 1, 2012
17:00

Boxscore

Petro Atlético (Angola)	70–69	(Tunisia) ES du Sahel
Scoring by quarter: 16-20, 9-14, 26-13, 19-22
Pts: Morais 26; Rebs: Leonel, P.Barros 10; Asts: Leonel 4		Pts: Maoua 18; Rebs: B.Romdhane 8 Asts: B.Romdhane, A.Smith 5

Malabo

December 3, 2012
11:00

[ Boxscore]

ASB Mazembe (Democratic Republic of the Congo)	63–76	(Egypt) Al Ahly
Scoring by quarter: 20-19, 16-13, 16-23, 11-21
Pts: Kasongo 12; Rebs: Ngongo 13; Asts: four players 2		Pts: Islam, El Gamal 16; Rebs: El Ghannam, Shamseia 7 Asts: El Gamal, El Shafie 3

Malabo

December 3, 2012
13:00

[ Boxscore]

Petro Atlético (Angola)	80–77	(Nigeria) Kano Pillars
Scoring by quarter: 9-25, 30-11, 26-24, 15-17
Pts: P.Barros, Bitee 17; Rebs: Ab.Gomes 10; Asts: Bitee 4		Pts: Gumut 21; Rebs: Mohammed 6 Asts: Yusuf 3

Malabo

December 3, 2012
21:00

[ Boxscore]

ES du Sahel (Tunisia)	63–79	(Angola) 1º de Agosto
Scoring by quarter: 10-18, 12-18, 24-26, 17-17
Pts: A.Smith 14; Rebs: Hdidane 5 Asts: B.Romdhane, Mouhli 2		Pts: Kikas 24; Rebs: Kikas 10; Asts: Armando 4

Malabo

December 4, 2012
13:00

[ Boxscore]

Petro Atlético (Angola)	86–65	(Democratic Republic of the Congo) ASB Mazembe
Pts: n/a Rebs: n/a		Pts: n/a Rebs: n/a

Malabo

December 4, 2012
15:00

[ Boxscore]

Kano Pillars (Nigeria)	63–70	(Tunisia) ES du Sahel
Pts: n/a Rebs: n/a		Pts: n/a Rebs: n/a

Malabo

December 4, 2012
17:00

[ Boxscore]

1º de Agosto (Angola)	86–56	(Egypt) Al Ahly
Pts: n/a Rebs: n/a		Pts: n/a Rebs: n/a

Malabo

== Knockout round ==
9th–12th Place
Thursday 6 December 11:00
(Democratic Republic of the Congo) ASB Mazembe	47
(Equatorial Guinea) Mongomo BC	51
Thursday 6 December 17:00
(Rwanda) Espoir Kigali	61
(Nigeria) Kano Pillars	110

9th place
Friday 7 December 17:00
(Equatorial Guinea) Mongomo BC	65
(Nigeria) Kano Pillars	74
11th place
Friday 7 December 11:00
(Democratic Republic of the Congo) ASB Mazembe	81
(Rwanda) Espoir Kigali	79

Quarter-finals
Thursday 6 December – 19:00
(Egypt) Al Ahly	69
(Angola) Rec do Libolo	64
Thursday 6 December – 21:00
(Ivory Coast) Abidjan BC	56
(Angola) 1º de Agosto	76
Thursday 6 December – 13:00
(Angola) Petro Atlético	84
(Gabon) Manga BB	66
Thursday 6 December – 15:00
(Tunisia) ES du Sahel	61
(Egypt) Al-Ittihad	75

5th–8th Place
Friday 7 December 13:00
(Angola) Rec do Libolo	78
(Ivory Coast) Abidjan BC	52
Friday 7 December 15:00
(Gabon) Manga BB	56
(Tunisia) ES du Sahel	73

5th place
Saturday 8 December 13:30
(Angola) Rec do Libolo	73
(Tunisia) ES du Sahel	70
7th place
Saturday 8 December 11:30
(Ivory Coast) Abidjan BC	63
(Gabon) Manga BB	73

Quarter-finals
Thursday 6 December – 19:00
(Egypt) Al Ahly	69
(Angola) Rec do Libolo	64
Thursday 6 December – 21:00
(Ivory Coast) Abidjan BC	56
(Angola) 1º de Agosto	76
Thursday 6 December – 13:00
(Angola) Petro Atlético	84
(Gabon) Manga BB	66
Thursday 6 December – 15:00
(Tunisia) ES duSahel	61
(Egypt) Al-Ittihad	75

Semi-finals
Friday 7 December – 19:00
(Egypt) Al Ahly	62
(Angola) 1º de Agosto	75
Friday 7 December – 21:00
(Angola) Petro Atlético	85
(Egypt) Al-Ittihad	73

Final
Saturday 8 December – 18:00
(Angola) 1º de Agosto	80
(Angola) Petro Atlético	69
Third place
Saturday 8 December – 15:00
(Egypt) Al Ahly	76
(Egypt) Al-Ittihad	64

=== 9th–12th place ===
December 6, 2012
11:00

Boxscore

Espoir Kigali (Rwanda)	61–110	(Nigeria) Kano Pillars
Scoring by quarter: 11-26, 18-19, 14-27, 18-38
Pts: Kabangu 17; Rebs: Kabangu 9 Asts: Mugabe 6		Pts: Gumut 23; Rebs: Yusuf 11; Asts: Daudu 5

Malabo

December 6, 2012
17:00

Boxscore

ASB Mazembe (Democratic Republic of the Congo)	47–51	(Equatorial Guinea) Mongomo BC
Scoring by quarter: 9-10, 11-15, 21-11, 6-15
Pts: Dibessa 14; Rebs: Ngongo 11; Asts: Dibessa, Ngongo 3		Pts: Montañana 15; Rebs: McGrew 10; Asts: Manana 2

Malabo

=== Quarter-finals ===
December 6, 2012
13:00

Boxscore

Manga BB (Gabon)	66–84	(Angola) Petro Atlético
Scoring by quarter: 17-18, 22-16, 12-29, 15-21
Pts: Obame 16; Rebs: Koumen 12; Asts: Bissielou 3		Pts: Leonel 20; Rebs: P.Barros 10; Asts: Santana 5

Malabo

December 6, 2012
15:00

Boxscore

ES du Sahel (Tunisia)	61–75	(Egypt) Al-Ittihad
Scoring by quarter: 13-13, 16-16, 12-18, 20-28
Pts: Hdidane 18; Rebs: Hdidane, Maoua 6 Asts: Hdidane 3		Pts: Cox 17; Rebs: Cox, Said 10; Asts: Said 6

Malabo

December 6, 2012
19:00

Boxscore

Al Ahly (Egypt)	69–64	(Angola) Rec do Libolo
Scoring by quarter: 13-19, 23-12, 13-14, 20-19
Pts: El Ghannam 27; Rebs: El Ghannam 13; Asts: Aboukhadra, El Gamal 3		Pts: Olímpio 14; Rebs: Olímpio, Ricardino 5 Asts: Olímpio, F.Sousa 4

Malabo

December 6, 2012
21:00

Boxscore

Abidjan BC (Ivory Coast)	56–76	(Angola) 1º de Agosto
Scoring by quarter: 13-11, 10-22, 10-18, 23-25
Pts: S.Konaté 18; Rebs: Amalabian 8 Asts: Gbotto, Ebikworo 3		Pts: Moore, Isom 16; Rebs: Ambrósio 7 Asts: three players 3

Malabo

=== 11th place ===
December 7, 2012
11:00

[ Boxscore]

ASB Mazembe (Democratic Republic of the Congo)	81–79	(Rwanda) Espoir Kigali
Scoring by quarter: 20-16, 22-17, 18-27, 21-19
Pts: Kasongo 22; Rebs: Kambuyi 8 Asts: Kubala 5		Pts: Mugabe 19; Rebs: Mbanzi 14; Asts: Mugabe 4

Malabo

=== 9th place ===
December 7, 2012
17:00

[ Boxscore]

Mongomo BC (Equatorial Guinea)	49–101	(Nigeria) Kano Pillars
Scoring by quarter: 9-28, 10-22, 18-37, 12-14
Pts: n/a Rebs: n/a Asts: n/a		Pts: n/a Rebs: n/a Asts: n/a

Malabo

=== 5th–8th place ===
December 7, 2012
13:00

Boxscore

Rec do Libolo (Angola)	78–52	(Ivory Coast) Abidjan BC
Scoring by quarter: 13-8, 26-19, 18-9, 21-16
Pts: Eddie 20; Rebs: Eddie, Olímpio 7 Asts: Olímpio 5		Pts: S.Konaté 17; Rebs: Agole 5 Asts: Meite 2

Malabo

December 7, 2012
15:00

Boxscore

Manga BB (Gabon)	56–73	(Tunisia) ES du Sahel
Scoring by quarter: 10-20, 13-22, 10-10, 23-21
Pts: Koumen 16; Rebs: Boungouere 8 Asts: four players 4		Pts: Chennoufi 14; Rebs: Chennoufi 11; Asts: Lahmar 5

Malabo

=== Semifinals ===
December 7, 2012
19:00

Boxscore

Al Ahly (Egypt)	62–75	(Angola) 1º de Agosto
Scoring by quarter: 11-28, 25-11, 13-26, 13-10
Pts: El Gamal 17; Rebs: El Ghannam 7 Asts: El Ghannam 3		Pts: Kikas 20; Rebs: Kikas 7 Asts: Isom 3

Malabo

December 7, 2012
21:00

Boxscore

Petro Atlético (Angola)	85–73	(Egypt) Al-Ittihad
Scoring by quarter: 21-17, 20-18, 21-18, 23-20
Pts: Morais 29; Rebs: Mbunga 8 Asts: Morais, Santana 3		Pts: Cox 18; Rebs: Cox 8 Asts: Burleson 3

Malabo

=== 7th place ===
December __, 2012
11:30

Boxscore

Abidjan BC (Ivory Coast)	63–73	(Gabon) Manga BB
Scoring by quarter: 18-14, 16-22, 18-22, 11-15
Pts: Gbotto 17; Rebs: Ebikworo 9 Asts: S.Konaté 3		Pts: Ombnago 20; Rebs: Reteno 7 Asts: Digondi 2

Malabo

=== 5th place ===
December __, 2012
13:30

Boxscore

Rec do Libolo (Angola)	73–70	(Tunisia) ES du Sahel
Scoring by quarter: 13-16, 17-16, 26-12, 17-26
Pts: Ricardino 17; Rebs: Olímpio 7 Asts: F.Sousa 4		Pts: Hdidane 23; Rebs: Hdidane 7 Asts: Maoua 2

Malabo

=== Bronze medal game ===
December __, 2012
15:00

Boxscore

Al Ahly (Egypt)	76–64	(Egypt) Al-Ittihad
Scoring by quarter: 22–13, 15–25, 21–14, 14–12
Pts: El Ghannam 18; Rebs: El Ghannam 19; Asts: El Disty 2		Pts: Cox 19; Rebs: Cox, Ibrahim 7 Asts: El Sabagh 4

Malabo

=== Gold medal game ===
December 8, 2012
18:00

Boxscore

1º de Agosto (Angola)	80–69	(Angola) Petro Atlético
Scoring by quarter: 16–17, 20–17, 16–13, 28–22
Pts: Moore 23; Rebs: Moore 10; Asts: Armando 4		Pts: Morais, Bitee 23; Rebs: three players 5 Asts: Morais 4

Malabo

== Final standings ==
Rank	Team	Record
Gold medal	(Angola) Primeiro de Agosto	7–1
Silver medal	(Angola) Petro Atlético	7–1
Bronze medal	(Egypt) Al Ahly	3–5
4	(Egypt) Al-Ittihad	5–3
5	(Angola) Recreativo do Libolo	7–1
6	(Tunisia) ES du Sahel	4–4
7	(Gabon) Manga BB	3–5
8	(Ivory Coast) Abidjan BC	4–4
9	(Nigeria) Kano Pillars	3–4
10	(Equatorial Guinea) Mongomo BC	2–5
11	(Democratic Republic of the Congo) ASB Mazembe	2–5
12	(Rwanda) Espoir Kigali	1–6

Primeiro de Agosto roster
Adilson Baza, Agostinho Coelho, Armando Costa, Carlos Almeida, Cedric Isom, Felizardo Ambrósio, Francisco Machado, Hermenegildo Santos, Islando Manuel, Joaquim Gomes, Miguel Lutonda, Reggie Moore, Coach: Paulo Macedo

== All Tournament Team ==
G	(Angola)	Armando Costa
G	(Angola)	Carlos Morais
F	(Angola)	Olímpio Cipriano
F	(United States)	Torrington Cox
C	(Egypt)	Tarek El Ghannam

2012 FIBA Africa Clubs Champions Cup

Clube Desportivo Primeiro de Agosto
7th Title

Most Valuable Player
(Angola) Carlos Morais

== See also ==
2013 FIBA Africa Championship
