= Liprobakin =

Basketball league in Kinshasa, Democratic Republic of Congo

- Countries: Democratic Republic of the Congo
- Region: Kinshasa
- Confederation: FIBA Africa
- Number of teams: 20 (men); 10 (women)
- Domestic cup: Coupe du Congo
- Current champions: BC SCTP (2024–25)
- Most championships: Men: New Generation (5 titles); Women: V.Club (4 titles)

The Ligue Provinciale de Basketball de Kinshasa (in English: Kinshasa Provincial Basketball League), better known as the Liprobakin, is an annual basketball competition for teams in Kinshasa, the capital of Democratic Republic of the Congo.

The top two teams qualify for each season of the Coupe du Congo, where the Kinshasa teams meet teams from other regions of the country.

== Men's teams ==
In the 2022 season, the following 20 teams played in the Liprobakin:

- Espoir Fukash
- Terreur
- SCTP
- Héritage des Vainqueurs
- Opportunidade
- Le Figuier
- New Generation
- Binza City
- AS Police
- Canon de Ndjili
- Mak
- Jeunesse
- Avenir
- DCMP
- Ngaliema
- City Kauka
- Ballers
- Don Bosco
- Debonhomme
- Molokai

== Men's champions ==
Season	Champions	Runners-up	Finals score	Third place	Ref.
1992	Terreur				
2013–14	Terreur (2)	Molokai		New Generation	
2014–15	New Generation				
2015–16	New Generation (2)				
2016–17	New Generation (3)				
2017–18	New Generation (4)				
2018–19	New Generation (5)	Terreur	78–68		
2019–20	Terreur (3)	Espoir Fukash	81–67	SCTP	
2020–21	Espoir Fukash	Terreur	88–81		
2021–22	Terreur (4)	SCTP	44–40		
2022–23	SCTP	DCMP	62–58	Terreur	
2023–24	Terreur (5)	SCTP	71–61	New Generation	
2024–25	SCTP	Terreur	56–55		

== Women's champions ==
Season	Champions	Runners-up	Finals score	Third place	Ref.
2014–15	V.Club				
2015–16	V.Club (2)				
2016–17	V.Club (3)				
2018–19	V.Club (4)	CNSS	78–60		
2019–20	Terreur	V.Club	86–51	Arc-en-ciel	
2020–21	CNSS	Arc-en-ciel	89–51		
2023–24	CNSS	Hatari	82–62		
