= 2010 FIBA Africa Clubs Champions Cup =

- Season: 2010
- Dates: December 10 – December 19
- Teams: 12

Regular season
- Season MVP: (Angola) Kikas Gomes

Finals
- Champions: (Angola) 1º de Agosto; 6th title
- Runners-up: (Cameroon) Condor
- Third place: (Morocco) AS Salé
- Fourth place: (Democratic Republic of the Congo) ASB Mazembe

The 2010 FIBA Africa Basketball Club Championship (25th edition), was an international basketball tournament held in Cotonou, Benin from 10 December to 19 December 2010. The tournament, organized by FIBA Africa, and hosted by ASO Modele, was contested by 11 clubs split into 2 groups, the top four of which qualifying for the knock-out stage, quarter, semi-finals and final.

The tournament was won by Primeiro de Agosto from Angola, thus retaining the title.

== Draw ==
Group A	Group B
(Democratic Republic of the Congo) ASB Mazembe (Morocco) AS Salé (Cameroon) Condor de Yaoundé (Angola) Primeiro de Agosto (Nigeria) Royal Hoopers	(Libya) Al Ahly (Benin) ASO Modele (Republic of the Congo) Inter Club Brazzaville (Nigeria) Kano Pillars (Gabon) Manga BB (Mozambique) Maxaquene

== Preliminary rounds ==
Times given below are in UTC+1.

=== Group A ===
Qualified for the quarter-finals

	Team	M	W	L	PF	PA	Diff	P
1.	(Angola) Primeiro de Agosto	4	3	1	318	276	+42	7
2.	(Cameroon) Condor de Yaoundé	4	2	2	272	256	+16	6
3.	(Democratic Republic of the Congo) ASB Mazembe	4	2	2	245	250	-5	6
4.	(Morocco) AS Salé	4	2	2	287	294	-7	6
5.	(Nigeria) Royal Hoopers	4	1	3	253	299	−46	5

December 10, 2010
10:00

Mazembe (Democratic Republic of the Congo)	69–57	(Nigeria) R. Hoopers
Scoring by quarter: 11-10, 13-16, 18-13, 27-18

14:00

AS Salé (Morocco)	79–77	(Cameroon) Condor
Scoring by quarter: 19-13, 18-25, 27-11, 15-28

December 11, 2010
12:00

R. Hoopers (Nigeria)	70–96	(Angola) 1º de Agosto
Scoring by quarter: 20-22, 16-27, 13-25, 21-22

14:00

Mazembe (Democratic Republic of the Congo)	55–61	(Morocco) AS Salé
Scoring by quarter: 18-10, 16-16, 6-22, 15-13

December 12, 2010
10:00

1º de Agosto (Angola)	66–74	(Cameroon) Condor
Scoring by quarter: 13-19, 26-18, 13-20, 14-17

18:00

R. Hoopers (Nigeria)	77–74	(Morocco) AS Salé
Scoring by quarter: 16-16, 22-10, 21-19, 18-29

December 14, 2010
14:00

1º de Agosto (Angola)	85–73	(Morocco) AS Salé
Scoring by quarter: 16-20, 24-17, 23-16, 22-20

18:00

Condor (Cameroon)	61–62	(Democratic Republic of the Congo) Mazembe
Scoring by quarter: 14-17, 19-16, 17-13, 11-16

December 15, 2010
12:00

Mazembe (Democratic Republic of the Congo)	59–71	1º de Agosto
Scoring by quarter: 14-16, 12-20, 13-20, 20-15

18:00

Condor (Cameroon)	60–49	(Nigeria) R. Hoopers
Scoring by quarter: 13-13, 10-15, 18-15, 19-6

=== Group B ===
Qualified for the quarter-finals

	Team	M	W	L	PF	PA	Diff	P
1.	(Nigeria) Kano Pillars	5	5	0	372	267	+105	10
2.	(Mozambique) Maxaquene	5	4	1	331	309	+22	9
3.	(Republic of the Congo) Inter Club Brazzaville	5	2	3	283	303	-20	7
4.	(Gabon) Manga BB	5	2	3	299	321	-222	7
5.	(Benin) ASO Modele	5	1	4	314	352	-38	6
6.	(Libya) Al Ahly	5	1	4	299	346	-47	6

December 10, 2010
12:00

Maxaquene (Mozambique)	70–62	(Republic of the Congo) Inter Club
Scoring by quarter: 14-13, 31-10, 12-17, 13-22

16:00

ASO Modele (Benin)	70–77	(Gabon) Manga BB
Scoring by quarter: 22-19, 8-22, 23-14, 17-22

18:00

Kano Pillars (Nigeria)	86–60	(Libya) Al Ahly
Scoring by quarter: 20-13, 25-10, 21-15, 20-22

December 11, 2010
10:00

Manga BB (Gabon)	51–54	(Republic of the Congo) Inter Club
Scoring by quarter: 20-15, 11-13, 9-15, 11-11

16:00

Al Ahly (Libya)	63–73	(Benin) ASO Modele
Scoring by quarter: 18-20, 7-11, 19-17, 19-25

18:00

Kano Pillars (Nigeria)	74–51	(Mozambique) Maxaquene
Scoring by quarter: 16-15, 22-14, 25-10, 11-12

December 12, 2010
12:00

Manga BB (Gabon)	45–71	(Nigeria) Kano Pillars

14:00

Al Ahly (Libya)	60–70	(Mozambique) Maxaquene
Scoring by quarter: 15-16, 16-16, 16-18, 13-20

16:00

ASO Modele (Benin)	58–65	(Republic of the Congo) Inter Club
Scoring by quarter: 18-18, 16-17, 14-16, 10-14

December 14, 2010
10:00

Al Ahly (Libya)	58–66	(Gabon) Manga BB
Scoring by quarter: 20-20, 12-15, 15-21, 11-10

12:00

Inter Club (Republic of the Congo)	51–66	(Nigeria) Kano Pillars
Scoring by quarter: 15-11, 14-16, 14-24, 8-15

16:00

ASO Modele (Benin)	53–72	(Mozambique) Maxaquene
Scoring by quarter: 7-18, 11-17, 16-20, 19-17

December 15, 2010
10:00

Maxaquene (Mozambique)	68–60	(Gabon) Manga BB
Scoring by quarter: 18-9, 21-16, 8-15, 21-20

14:00

Inter Club (Republic of the Congo)	51–58	(Libya) Al Ahly
Scoring by quarter: 2-17, 17-7, 14-9, 18-25

16:00

Kano Pillars (Nigeria)	75–60	(Benin) ASO Modele
Scoring by quarter: 24-14, 15-17, 23-16, 13-13

== Knockout stage ==
9th-11th Place
Friday 17 December 10:00
(Libya) Al Ahly	63
(Nigeria) Royal Hoopers	73

9th place
Saturday 18 December 10:00
(Nigeria) Royal Hoopers	76
(Benin) ASO Modele	66
11th place

Quarter-finals
Friday 17 December – 12:00
(Cameroon) Condor	67
(Nigeria) Kano Pillars	61
Friday 17 December – 14:00
(Republic of the Congo) Inter Club	41
(Morocco) AS Salé	71
Friday 17 December – 16:00
(Gabon) Manga BB	38
(Angola) 1º de Agosto	66
Friday 17 December – 18:00
(Democratic Republic of the Congo) ASB Mazembe	67
(Mozambique) Maxaquene	48

5th-8th Place
Saturday 18 December 12:00
(Nigeria) Kano Pillars	60
(Republic of the Congo) Inter Club	41
Saturday 18 December 14:00
(Gabon) Manga BB	64
(Mozambique) Maxaquene	57

5th place
Sunday 19 December 12:00
(Nigeria) Kano Pillars	74
(Gabon) Manga BB	45
7th place
Sunday 19 December 10:00
(Republic of the Congo) Inter Club	41
(Mozambique) Maxaquene	67

Quarter-finals
Friday 17 December – 12:00
(Cameroon) Condor	67
(Nigeria) Kano Pillars	61
Friday 17 December – 14:00
(Republic of the Congo) Inter Club	41
(Morocco) AS Salé	71
Friday 17 December – 16:00
(Gabon) Manga BB	38
(Angola) 1º de Agosto	66
Friday 17 December – 18:00
(Democratic Republic of the Congo) ASB Mazembe	67
(Mozambique) Maxaquene	48

Semi-finals
Saturday 18 December – 16:00
(Cameroon) Condor	68
(Morocco) AS Salé	44
Saturday 18 December – 18:00
(Angola) 1º de Agosto	79
(Egypt) ASB Mazembe	67

Final
Sunday 19 December – 17:00
(Cameroon) Condor	41
(Angola) 1º de Agosto	73
Third place
Sunday 19 December – 14:00
(Morocco) AS Salé	75
(Democratic Republic of the Congo) ASB Mazembe	71

=== 9–11th place ===
December 17, 2010
10:00

Al Ahly (Libya)	63–73	(Nigeria) R. Hoopers
Scoring by quarter: 17-12, 11-22, 22-20, 13-19

=== Quarter finals ===
December 17, 2010
12:00

Condor (Cameroon)	67–61	(Nigeria) Kano Pillars
Scoring by quarter: 14-21, 12-13, 20-14, 21-13

14:00

Inter Club (Republic of the Congo)	41–71	(Morocco) AS Salé
Scoring by quarter: 16-17, 11-12, 5-27, 9-15

16:00

Manga BB (Gabon)	38–66	(Angola) 1º de Agosto
Scoring by quarter: 14-23, 7-16, 10-14, 7-13

18:00

Mazembe (Democratic Republic of the Congo)	67–48	(Mozambique) Maxaquene
Scoring by quarter: 17-13, 13-10, 17-16, 20-9

=== 9th place ===
December 18, 2010
10:00

Royal Hoopers (Nigeria)	76–66	(Benin) ASO Modele

=== 5–8th place ===
December 18, 2010
12:00

Kano Pillars (Nigeria)	60–41	(Republic of the Congo) Inter Club
Scoring by quarter: 10-17, 19-6, 18-7, 13-11

14:00

Manga BB (Gabon)	64–57	(Mozambique) Maxaquene
Scoring by quarter: 15-12, 17-23, 10-13, 22-9

=== Semifinals ===
December 18, 2010
16:00

Condor (Cameroon)	68–44	(Morocco) AS Salé
Scoring by quarter: 16-18, 16-8, 16-11, 20-7

18:00

1º de Agosto (Angola)	85–73	(Democratic Republic of the Congo) ASB Mazembe
Scoring by quarter: 23-9, 15-25, 26-14, 15-19

=== 7th place ===
December 19, 2010
10:00

Inter Club (Republic of the Congo)	41–67	(Mozambique) Maxaquene
Scoring by quarter: 10-20, 14-14, 2-20, 15-13

=== 5th place ===
December 19, 2010
12:00

Kano Pillars (Nigeria)	74–45	(Gabon) Manga BB
Scoring by quarter: 17-6, 15-9, 18-12, 24-18

=== Bronze medal game ===
December 19, 2010
14:00

AS Salé (Morocco)	75–71	(Democratic Republic of the Congo) Mazembe
Scoring by quarter: 21-19, 20-14, 19-15, 15-23

=== Gold medal game ===
December 19, 2010
17:00

Condor Yaoundé (Cameroon)	41–73	(Angola) 1º de Agosto
Scoring by quarter: 11-20, 2-18, 9-17, 19-18
Pts: Mbog, Monkam 9		Pts: Kikas 27

Palais de Sports de Kouhounou, Cotonou
Referees: Moussa Toure (MLI), Chlif Abdelilah (MAR), Abreu Muhimua (MOZ)

== Final standings ==
Rank	Team	Record
Gold medal	(Angola) Primeiro de Agosto	6–1
Silver medal	(Cameroon) Condor de Yaoundé	4–3
Bronze medal	(Morocco) AS Salé	4–3
4	(Democratic Republic of the Congo) ASB Mazembe	3–4
5	(Nigeria) Kano Pillars	7–1
6	(Gabon) Manga BB	3–5
7	(Mozambique) Maxaquene	5–3
8	(Republic of the Congo) Inter Club Brazzaville	2–6
9	(Nigeria) Royal Hoopers	3–3
10	(Benin) ASO Modele	1–5
11	(Libya) Al Ahly	1–5

Primeiro de Agosto roster
Adilson Baza, Adolfo Quimbamba, Carlos Almeida, Felizardo Ambrósio, Filipe Abraão, Hélder Ortet, Hermenegildo Santos, Joaquim Gomes, Karlton Mims, Mário Correia, Miguel Lutonda, Vladimir Ricardino Coach: Luís Magalhães

== All Tournament Team ==
G	(Nigeria) Aboubakar Usman
G	(Cameroon) Christian Bayang
F	(Angola) Felizardo Ambrósio
F	(United States) Cameron Echols
C	(Angola) Joaquim Gomes "Kikas"

2010 FIBA Africa Clubs Champions Cup

Clube Desportivo Primeiro de Agosto
6th Title

Most Valuable Player
(Angola) Joaquim Gomes "Kikas"

== See also ==
2011 FIBA Africa Championship
