= Rolly Fula Nganga =

Congolese basketball player

No. 15 – Bangui Sporting Club
- Position: Shooting guard
- League: BAL

Personal information
- Born: 2 February 1993 (age 33) Lubumbashi, DR Congo
- Listed height: 1.98 m (6 ft 6 in)

Career history
- ASB Soyo de Matadi
- SCTP
- Ravens
- 2014–2018: Mazembe
- 2018–2019: Dalia Sportive de Grombalia
- 2019: Mazembe
- 2021–2022: Espoir Fukash
- 2022: Bangui Sporting Club
- 2023: APR
- 2023–present: Bangui Sporting Club

Career highlights
- RBL champion (2023); 3× Cup of Congo winner (2014, 2017, 2018)
Medals
Men's basketball
Representing the Democratic Republic of the Congo
FIBA AfroCan
Gold medal – first place	2019 Mali

Rolly Fula Nganga (born 2 February 1993) is a Congolese basketball player, who plays for APR, Bangui Sporting Club and the Democratic Republic of the Congo national team. Standing at 198 cm (6 ft 6 in), he plays as shooting guard.

== Career ==
Fula Nganga started his career playing for ASB Soyo de Matadi, SCTP and Ravens, before signing with Mazembe in 2014. He stayed there for four years, winning the Cup of Congo three times (2014, 2017 and 2018). After that, Fula played with Dalia Sportive de Grombalia in Tunisia for one season. In 2019, he returned to Mazembe to play in the 2020 BAL Qualifying Tournaments.

In March 2020, Fula signed with GS Pétroliers in Algeria to play in the 2020 BAL season. However, due to the COVID-19 pandemic the season was cancelled and Fula never played for the team.

In October 2021, Fula was on the roster of Espoir Fukash during the 2022 BAL Qualifying Tournaments. He scored 29 points in the decisive game against AS Police, to help the team qualify for the 2022 BAL season. On April 19, 2022, Fula scored a game-high 29 points in Espoir's first-ever league win over Cape Town. In the 2022 BAL regular season, he averaged a team-high 18.4 points per game on 40.2% shooting from the field, along with 5.6 rebounds.

In November 2022, he was on the roster of Bangui Sporting Club during the 2023 Road to BAL.

In January 2023, Fula Nganga signed with APR of the Rwanda Basketball League (RBL). He won the 2023 RBL championship, APR's first title in 14 years.

In October 2023, Fula Nganga returned to Bangui Sporting Club for a second Road to BAL tournament. This time, he helped Bangui to successfully qualify for the 2024 BAL season. On 5 November 2023, he scored the game-winning three pointer in the West Division final against FUS Rabat. Fula Nganga averaged a career-high 20.2 points per game, 3.2 rebounds, and 2 steals per game while shooting 47.8% from three-point range.

== National team career ==
Fula Nganga was a member of the DR Congo national basketball team, and helped the team win the gold medal at FIBA AfroCan 2019, contributing 17 points and 4.5 rebounds per game.

== BAL career statistics ==
Legend
GP	Games played	GS	Games started	MPG	Minutes per game
FG%	Field goal percentage	3P%	3-point field goal percentage	FT%	Free throw percentage
RPG	Rebounds per game	APG	Assists per game	SPG	Steals per game
BPG	Blocks per game	PPG	Points per game	**Bold**	Career high

Year	Team	GP	GS	MPG	FG%	3P%	FT%	RPG	APG	SPG	BPG	PPG
2022	Espoir Fukash	5	4	32.5	.402	.317	.750	5.6	2.4	1.0	.4	18.4
2024	Bangui SC	6	6	37.6	.524	.478	.688	3.2	1.5	2.0	0.7	20.2
