= 2009 FIBA Africa Clubs Champions Cup =

- Season: 2009
- Dates: 13–22 December 2009
- Teams: 9

Regular season
- Season MVP: (Angola) Vladimir Ricardino

Finals
- Champions: (Angola) Primeiro de Agosto (5th title)
- Runners-up: (Angola) Petro de Luanda
- Third place: (Rwanda) APR
- Fourth place: (Democratic Republic of the Congo) ASB Mazembe

The 2009 FIBA Africa Basketball Club Championship (24th edition), was an international basketball tournament held in Kigali, Rwanda, from December 13 to 22, 2009. The tournament, organized by FIBA Africa, and hosted by APR, was contested by 9 clubs split into 2 groups, the first four of which qualifying for the knock-out stage, quarter-finals, semifinals and final.

The tournament was won by Primeiro de Agosto from Angola, thus defending its title.

== Draw ==
Group A	Group B
(Rwanda) APR (Democratic Republic of the Congo) ASB Mazembe (Nigeria) Kano Pillars (Angola) Petro Atlético	(Benin) ASPAC (Kenya) Co-op Bank (Republic of the Congo) Inter Club Brazzaville (Angola) Primeiro de Agosto (Uganda) Warriors

== Preliminary rounds ==
Times given below are in UTC+2.

=== Group A ===
Qualified for the quarter-finals

	Group A	M	W	L	PF	PA	Diff	P
1.	(Angola) Petro Atlético	3	3	0	479	301	+178	10
2.	(Rwanda) APR	3	2	1	381	346	+35	8
3.	(Democratic Republic of the Congo) ASB Mazembe	3	1	2	348	322	+26	8
4.	(Nigeria) Kano Pillars	3	0	3	304	312	-8	4

December 13, 2009
16:00

ASB Mazembe (Democratic Republic of the Congo)	59–91	(Rwanda) APR
Scoring by quarter: 14-13, 16-17, 17-29, 12-32

December 16, 2009
16:00

Petro Atlético (Angola)	83–74	(Nigeria) Kano Pillars
Scoring by quarter: 14-21, 21-12, 25-19, 23-22

December 14, 2009
16:00

Kano Pillars (Nigeria)	77–92	(Rwanda) APR
Scoring by quarter: 13-19, 13-24, 22-23, 31-26

December 15, 2009
14:00

Petro Atlético (Angola)	92–60	(Democratic Republic of the Congo) ASB Mazembe
Scoring by quarter: 17-9, 22-11, 25-18, 28-22

December 17, 2009
14:00

ASB Mazembe (Democratic Republic of the Congo)	75–74	(Nigeria) Kano Pillars
Scoring by quarter: 22-25, 13-16, 22-15, 18-18

16:00

APR (Rwanda)	69–84	(Angola) Petro Atlético
Scoring by quarter: 17-25, 18-17, 18-13, 16-29

=== Group B ===
Qualified for the quarter-finals

	Group B	M	W	L	PF	PA	Diff	P
1.	(Angola) Primeiro de Agosto	4	4	0	402	349	+53	10
2.	(Benin) ASPAC	4	3	1	411	338	+73	8
3.	(Republic of the Congo) Inter Club Brazzaville	4	2	2	321	304	+17	6
4.	(Kenya) Co-op Bank	4	1	3	302	348	-46	2
5.	(Uganda) Warriors	4	0	4	345	368	-23	2

December 13, 2009
13:00

Co-op Bank (Kenya)	71–70	(Uganda) Warriors
Scoring by quarter: 20-13, 17-17, 20-20, 14-20

18:00

Inter Club (Democratic Republic of the Congo)	74–115	(Angola) 1º de Agosto
Scoring by quarter: 8-30, 15-31, 24-31, 27-23

December 14, 2009
18:00

Co-op Bank (Kenya)	75–83	(Republic of the Congo) Inter Club
Scoring by quarter: 19-24, 8-22, 26-16, 22-21

14:00

ASPAC (Benin)	77–119	(Angola) 1º de Agosto
Scoring by quarter: 26-21, 15-35, 18-35, 18-28

December 15, 2009
16:00

Warriors (Uganda)	54–95	(Republic of the Congo) Inter Club
Scoring by quarter: 17-21, 17-22, 7-21, 13-31

18:00

ASPAC (Benin)	79–49	(Kenya) Co-op Bank
Scoring by quarter: 20-8, 17-16, 17-7, 25-18

December 16, 2009
14:00

Warriors (Uganda)	56–97	(Benin) ASPAC
Scoring by quarter: 14-18, 12-25, 17-22, 13-32

18:00

1º de Agosto (Angola)	110–54	(Kenya) Co-op Bank
Scoring by quarter: 38-16, 22-13, 30-7, 20-18

December 17, 2009
12:00

Inter Club (Republic of the Congo)	52–68	(Benin) ASPAC
Scoring by quarter: 9-19, 12-15, 10-24, 21-10

18:00

1º de Agosto (Angola)	110–64	(Uganda) Warriors
Scoring by quarter: 24-14, 29-23, 24-12, 33-15

== Knockout stage ==
Quarter-finals
Saturday, 19 December
(Nigeria) Co-op Bank	56
(Angola) Petro Atlético	106
Saturday, 19 December
(Democratic Republic of the Congo) ASB Mazembe	86
(Benin) ASPAC	82
Saturday, 19 December
(Angola) 1º de Agosto	94
(Nigeria) Kano Pillars	74
Saturday, 19 December
(Republic of the Congo) Inter Club	80
(Rwanda) APR	99

5th-8th Place
Sunday, 20 December
(Nigeria) Co-op Bank	62
(Ivory Coast) ASPAC	89
Sunday, 20 December
(Nigeria) Kano Pillars	85
(Republic of the Congo) Inter Club	65

5th place
Monday, 22 December
(Ivory Coast) ASPAC	76
(Nigeria) Kano Pillars	107
7th place
Monday, 22 December
(Nigeria) Co-op Bank	68
(Republic of the Congo) Inter Club	77

Quarter-finals
Saturday, 19 December
(Nigeria) Co-op Bank	56
(Angola) Petro Atlético	106
Saturday, 19 December
(Democratic Republic of the Congo) ASB Mazembe	86
(Benin) ASPAC	82
Saturday, 19 December
(Angola) 1º de Agosto	94
(Nigeria) Kano Pillars	74
Saturday, 19 December
(Republic of the Congo) Inter Club	80
(Rwanda) APR	99

Semi-finals
Sunday, 20 December
(Angola) Petro Atlético	90
(Democratic Republic of the Congo) ASB Mazembe	88
Sunday, 20 December
(Angola) 1º de Agosto	98
(Rwanda) APR	84

Final
Monday, 22 December
(Angola) Petro Atlético	64
(Angola) 1º de Agosto	88
Third place
Monday, 22 December
(Democratic Republic of the Congo) ASB Mazembe	80
(Rwanda) APR	92

=== Quarter-finals ===
December 19, 2009
12:00

Co-op Bank (Kenya)	56–106	(Angola) Petro Atlético
Scoring by quarter: 8-20, 20-28, 27-20, 19-26
Pts: n/a		Pts: Porter 19

14:00

ASB Mazembe (Democratic Republic of the Congo)	86–82	(Benin) ASPAC
Scoring by quarter: 27-14, 21-23, 19-17, 19-28
Pts: Kubala 25		Pts: Bukar 31

16:00

Inter Club (Republic of the Congo)	80–99	(Rwanda) APR
Scoring by quarter: 14-26, 19-24, 22-23, 25-26
Pts: n/a		Pts: Isom 22

18:00

Kano Pillars (Nigeria)	74–94	(Angola) 1º de Agosto
Scoring by quarter: 8-20, 20-28, 27-20, 19-26
Pts: Usman 21		Pts: Correia 17

=== 5th-8th place ===
December 20, 2009
12:00

Co-op Bank (Kenya)	62–89	(Benin) ASPAC
Scoring by quarter: 18-26, 11-25, 15-17, 18-21
Pts: Chadare 21		Pts: Bukar 24

December 20, 2009
14:00

Kano Pillars (Nigeria)	85–65	(Republic of the Congo) Inter Club
Pts: Usman 14		Pts: n/a

=== Semifinals ===
December 20, 2009
16:00

1º de Agosto (Angola)	98–84	(Rwanda) APR
Scoring by quarter: 26-18, 21-19, 25-19, 26-28
Pts: Ricardino 32		Pts: Isom 23

December 20, 2009
18:00

Petro Atlético (Angola)	90–88	(Democratic Republic of the Congo) ASB Mazembe
Scoring by quarter: 16-25, 28-25, 24-23, 22-15
Pts: Terry 24		Pts: n/a

=== 7th place ===
December 22, 2009
12:00

Co-op Bank (Kenya)	68–77	(Republic of the Congo) Inter Club
Scoring by quarter: 13-21, 13-17, 25-19, 17-20
Pts: Ajik 15		Pts: Mbatchi 17

=== 5th place ===
December 22, 2009
14:00

ASPAC (Benin)	76–107	(Nigeria) Kano Pillars
Scoring by quarter: 14-19, 24-31, 24-23, 14-34
Pts: Bukar 25		Pts: Yusuf 20

=== Bronze medal game ===
December 22, 2009
16:00

ASB Mazembe (Democratic Republic of the Congo)	80–92	(Rwanda) APR
Scoring by quarter: 16-22, 21-23, 21-20, 22-27
Pts: Kabwit 26		Pts: Isom 37

=== Gold medal game ===
December 22, 2009
18:00

Petro Atlético (Angola)	64–88	(Angola) 1º de Agosto
Scoring by quarter: 16-19, 17-22, 20-21, 11-26
Pts: Porter 18		Pts: C.Almeida 24

== Final standings ==
Rank	Team	Record
Gold medal	(Angola) Primeiro de Agosto	7–0
Silver medal	(Angola) Petro Atlético	5–1
Bronze medal	(Rwanda) APR	4–2
4	(Democratic Republic of the Congo) ASB Mazembe	5–3
5	(Nigeria) Kano Pillars	2–4
6	(Benin) ASPAC	4–3
7	(Republic of the Congo) Inter Club	3–4
8	(Kenya) Co-op Bank	1–6
9	(Uganda) Warriors	0–4

Primeiro de Agosto roster
Armando Costa, Carlos Almeida, Felizardo Ambrósio, Filipe Abraão, Joaquim Gomes, Mário Correia, Miguel Lutonda, Rodrigo Mascarenhas, Vladimir Ricardino, Coach: Luís Magalhães

== All Tournament Team ==
G	(United States)	Cedric Isom
G	(United States)	Curtis Terry
F	(Angola)	Vladimir Ricardino
F	(Cape Verde)	Rodrigo Mascarenhas
C	(Angola)	Eduardo Mingas

2009 FIBA Africa Clubs Champions Cup

Clube Desportivo Primeiro de Agosto
5th Title

Most Valuable Player
(Angola) Vladimir Ricardino

== See also ==
2009 FIBA Africa Championship
