= BC Espoir Fukash =

Espoir Fukash
- League: Liprobakin
- Founded: 2019
- History: BC Espoir Fukash; 2019–present
- Location: Kinshasa, Democratic Republic of the Congo
- Chairman: Benito Furume Ntale
- President: Suzy Kashiama Kafutshi
- Head coach: Giresse Bongubu
- Team captain: Paulka Kanundowe
- Championships: 1 Kinshasa champion 1 Congolese Cup
- Website: espoir-fukash.com
Home	Away

BC Espoir Fukash is a Congolese basketball team based in Kinshasa. The team plays in the Liprobakin, Kinshasa's premier basketball league. The team has won the Kinshasa title one time in 2021, and have won the Congolese Cup in 2021. Espoir Fukash played in the Basketball Africa League (BAL) during the 2022 season

== History ==
Created in 2019, Espoir reached the final of the Ligue Provinciale de Kinshasa for the first time in 2020. However, the team lost to BC Terreur. The following season, the team won their first regional championship. In October 2021, Espoir Fukash won the Congolese Cup, their first national trophy in club history. As such, they qualified for the 2022 BAL Qualifying Tournaments. They won their first international game, on 30 October 2021, over Tondema with 102–49. On December 15, Espoir qualified for the 2022 BAL season after eliminating Mali's AS Police in the semi-finals, winning after overtime. As such, the team becomes the first club from the Democratic Republic of the Congo to play in the BAL.

In the 2022 BAL Nile Conference, Espoir was coached by DR Congo-native Emmanuel Mavomo. On April 20, 2022, the team captured its first BAL victory after beating Cape Town Tigers after overtime. Fukash finished in the sixth and last place with a 1–4 record.

== Honours ==
Coupe du Congo

- Winners (1): 2021

Liprobakin

- Champions (1): 2021
  - Runner-up (1): 2020

== Players ==
=== Current roster ===
The following is the Espoir Fukash roster for the 2022 BAL season group phase.

Note: Flags indicate national team eligibility at FIBA-sanctioned events. Players may hold other non-FIBA nationalities not displayed.

Espoir Fukash roster
Players
Coaches

Pos.	No.	Nat.	Name	Ht.	Age
PG	00	(Democratic Republic of the Congo)	Mwana Mwamba, Arsène	1.80 m (5 ft 11 in)	24 – 8 April 2001
G/F	1	(Canada)	Ambanza, Narcisse (I)	1.88 m (6 ft 2 in)	29 – 3 December 1996
SG	2	(Democratic Republic of the Congo)	Ben Ilunga, Mutanga	1.90 m (6 ft 3 in)	24 – 17 May 2001
F	4	(Nigeria)	Okorafor, Emmanuel (E)	2.06 m (6 ft 9 in)	21 – 8 June 2004
F	5	(Democratic Republic of the Congo)	Kapongo Kabuya, Djack	1.96 m (6 ft 5 in)	32 – 15 February 1993
SG	6	(Democratic Republic of the Congo)	Kasongo Kasasa, Bobo	1.88 m (6 ft 2 in)	35 – 20 May 1990
PG	10	(Democratic Republic of the Congo)	Suke Tamba, Habraham	1.80 m (5 ft 11 in)	24 – 17 September 2001
PF	12	(Democratic Republic of the Congo)	Mandiangu Makwenda, Jeremie	2.01 m (6 ft 7 in)	21 – 20 April 2004
F/C	13	(Democratic Republic of the Congo)	Mpaka Laza, Chris	2.05 m (6 ft 9 in)	22 – 27 October 2003
F	15	(Democratic Republic of the Congo)	Fula Nganga, Rolly	2.01 m (6 ft 7 in)	32 – 2 February 1993
PF	23	(Democratic Republic of the Congo)	Bobo Mel, Glory	1.98 m (6 ft 6 in)	36 – 2 October 1989
F	24	(Democratic Republic of the Congo)	Tshimbau, Jonathan	1.90 m (6 ft 3 in)	37 – 18 July 1988
PF	34	(Democratic Republic of the Congo)	Isungu, Emmanuel	2.04 m (6 ft 8 in)	31 – 26 January 1995

Head coach

- (Democratic Republic of the Congo) Raven Mwimba

Assistant coach(es)

- (Democratic Republic of the Congo) Emmanuel Mavomo
- (Democratic Republic of the Congo) Giresse Bongubufunao

Legend

- (C) Team captain
- (I) Import player
- (E): BAL Elevate program player
- Injured

- Roster
Updated: April 8, 2022

== Season by season ==
Season	League	Conference	Regular season					Postseason	Head coach
Season	League	Conference	Finish	Played	Wins	Losses	Win %	Postseason	Head coach
Espoir Fukash
2022	BAL	Nile	6th	5	1	4	.200	Did not qualify	Emmanuel Mavomo
