= 2002 FIBA Africa Clubs Champions Cup =

- Season: 2002
- Dates: 30 November – 7 December 2002
- Teams: 7

Regular season
- Season MVP: (Angola) Abdel Bouckar

Finals
- Champions: (Angola) Primeiro de Agosto (1st title)
- Runners-up: (Ivory Coast) ASEC Mimosas
- Third place: (Republic of the Congo) Inter Club
- Fourth place: (Gabon) Capo Libreville

Statistical leaders
- Points: (Gabon) Marius Assoumou

The 2002 FIBA Africa Clubs Champions Cup was the 18th FIBA Africa Basketball Club Championship, an international basketball tournament held in Luanda, Angola from November 30 to December 7, 2002. The tournament, organized by FIBA Africa and hosted by C.D. Primeiro de Agosto, was contested by 7 clubs, in a round robin system.

The tournament was won by Primeiro de Agosto from host country Angola.

== Participating teams ==
(Ivory Coast) Abidjan Basket Club
(Ivory Coast) ASEC Mimosas
(Gabon) Capo Libreville
(Republic of the Congo) Inter Club
(Kenya) KPA
(Angola) Primeiro de Agosto
(Mali) Stade Malien

== Schedule ==
Times given below are in UTC+1.

	Team	M	W	L	PF	PA	Diff	P
1.	(Angola) Primeiro de Agosto	6	6	0	493	331	+162	12
2.	(Ivory Coast) ASEC Mimosas	6	4	2	441	399	+42	10
3.	(Republic of the Congo) Inter Club	6	3	3	445	431	+14	9
4.	(Gabon) Capo Libreville	6	3	3	451	449	+2	9
5.	(Ivory Coast) Abidjan Basket Club	6	3	3	410	393	+17	9
6.	(Mali) Stade Malien	6	2	4	408	451	-43	8
7.	(Kenya) KPA	6	0	6	375	569	-194	6

=== Day 1 ===
30 November 2002
19:00

Report

Primeiro de Agosto (Angola)	107–42	(Kenya) KPA
Scoring by quarter: 22-11, 28-6, 36-9, 21-16
Pts: A.Silva 19		Pts: Opiyo 14

Pavilhão da Cidadela, Luanda

1 December 2002
10:00

Report

Inter Club (Republic of the Congo)	69–72	(Mali) Stade Malien
Scoring by quarter: 20-20, 19-10
Pts: Kadima 20		Pts: n/a

Pavilhão do CODENM, Luanda

17:00

Report

ABC (Ivory Coast)	61–59	(Ivory Coast) ASEC Mimosas
Scoring by quarter: 12-10, 15-15, 19-17, 15-17
Pts: Bakayoko 16		Pts: Amalabian 10

Pavilhão do CODENM, Luanda

=== Day 2 ===
2 December 2002
10:00

[ Report]

Capo Libreville (Gabon)	96–80	(Kenya) KPA
Scoring by quarter: 20-20, 31-11, 23-25, 22-24
Pts: Assoumou 34		Pts: Opiyo 22

Pavilhão da Cidadela, Luanda

17:00

[ Report]

Inter Club (Republic of the Congo)	61–70	(Ivory Coast) ASEC Mimosas
Scoring by quarter: n/a, n/a
Pts: Ndonga 17		Pts: Amalabian 18

Pavilhão da Cidadela, Luanda

19:00

[ Report]

Primeiro de Agosto (Angola)	59–55	(Ivory Coast) ABC
Scoring by quarter: 9-4, 20-20, 22-18, 12-13
Pts: Abdel 16		Pts: Bakayoko 17

Pavilhão da Cidadela, Luanda

=== Day 3 ===
3 December 2002
10:00

Report

Stade Malien (Mali)	73–75	(Ivory Coast) ASEC Mimosas
Scoring by quarter: 15-19, 23-22, 15-18, 20-16
Pts: Kaome 19		Pts: Kanoute 18

Pavilhão do CODENM, Luanda

17:00

Report

Capo Libreville (Gabon)	71–64	(Ivory Coast) ABC
Scoring by quarter: 13-11, 19-17, 13-20, 26-16
Pts: Assoumou 26		Pts: Oloubi 14

Pavilhão da Cidadela, Luanda

19:00

Report

Inter Club (Republic of the Congo)	55–88	(Angola) Primeiro de Agosto
Scoring by quarter: 16-16, 9-24, 7-21, 23-17
Pts: Ndonga 17		Pts: Ângelo 16

Pavilhão da Cidadela, Luanda

=== Day 4 ===
4 December 2002
10:00

Report

KPA (Kenya)	74–86	(Ivory Coast) ABC
Scoring by quarter: 17-24, 16-24, 23-13, 18-25
Pts: G.Omondi 16		Pts: Bakayoko 24

Pavilhão do CODENM, Luanda

17:00

Report

Capo Libreville (Gabon)	81–85	(Republic of the Congo) Inter Club
Scoring by quarter: 24-15, 20-13, 20-24, 17-33
Pts: Assoumou 20		Pts: Aubin 26

Pavilhão da Cidadela, Luanda

19:00

Report

Stade Malien (Mali)	68–87	(Angola) Primeiro de Agosto
Scoring by quarter: 12-32, 24-16, 14-21, 18-18
Pts: Kanoute 20		Pts: Lutonda 20

Pavilhão da Cidadela, Luanda

=== Day 5 ===
5 December 2002
10:00

Report

KPA (Kenya)	53–103	(Republic of the Congo) Inter Club
Scoring by quarter: 7-23, 11-23, 20-28, 15-29
Pts: Oyo 21		Pts: Aubin 20

Pavilhão do CODENM, Luanda

17:00

Report

Stade Malien (Mali)	62–82	(Gabon) Capo Libreville
Scoring by quarter: 18-19, 21-18, 6-24, 17-21
Pts: Tangara 24		Pts: Assoumou 21

Pavilhão da Cidadela, Luanda

19:00

Report

ASEC Mimosas (Ivory Coast)	60–69	(Angola) Primeiro de Agosto
Scoring by quarter: 12-18, 11-17, 22-14, 15-20
Pts: Amalabian 24		Pts: Lutonda 21

Pavilhão da Cidadela, Luanda

=== Day 6 ===
6 December 2002
10:00

Report

ABC (Ivory Coast)	67–72	(Republic of the Congo) Inter Club
Scoring by quarter: 12-12, 14-17, 22-17, 19-26
Pts: Bangoura 14		Pts: Aubin 15

Pavilhão do CODENM, Luanda

17:00

Report

ASEC Mimosas (Ivory Coast)	75–70	(Gabon) Capo Libreville
Scoring by quarter: 20-21, 18-10, 17-20, 20-19
Pts: Franel 16		Pts: Assoumou 33

Pavilhão da Cidadela, Luanda

19:00

[ Report]

KPA (Kenya)	61–75	(Mali) Stade Malien

Pavilhão da Cidadela, Luanda

=== Day 7 ===
7 December 2002
10:00

Report

ABC (Ivory Coast)	77–58	(Mali) Stade Malien
Scoring by quarter: 15-10, 23-21, 17-9, 22-18
Pts: Titidjo 17		Pts: Kanoute 15

Pavilhão do CODENM, Luanda

17:00

Report

ASEC Mimosas (Ivory Coast)	102–65	(Kenya) KPA
Scoring by quarter: 30-12, 30-18, 19-16, 23-19
Pts: Amalabian 18		Pts: Omolo 15

Pavilhão da Cidadela, Luanda

19:00

Report

Primeiro de Agosto (Angola)	83–51	(Gabon) Capo Libreville
Scoring by quarter: 25-7, 18-4, 20-14, 20-21
Pts: Selengue 15		Pts: Assoumou 18

Pavilhão da Cidadela, Luanda

== Final standings ==
Rank	Team	Record
Gold medal	(Angola) Primeiro de Agosto	6–0
Silver medal	(Ivory Coast) ASEC Mimosas	4–2
Bronze medal	(Republic of the Congo) Inter Club Brazzaville	3–3
4	(Gabon) Capo Libreville	3–3
5	(Ivory Coast) Abidjan Basket Club	3–3
6	(Mali) Stade Malien	2–4
7	(Kenya) KPA	0–6

Primeiro de Agosto roster
Guards	Garcia Domingos, Miguel Lutonda, Walter Costa
Forwards	Afonso Silva, Ângelo Victoriano, Carlos Almeida, Edmar Victoriano
	Olímpio Cipriano
Centers	Abdel Bouckar, Buila Katiavala, Lifetu Selengue, Victor Muzadi
Coach	Mário Palma

== All Tournament Team ==
2002 FIBA Africa Clubs Champions Cup

Primeiro de Agosto
1st title

Most Valuable Player
(Angola) Abdel Bouckar

== See also ==
- 2003 FIBA Africa Championship
