= Emmanuel Mavomo =

French - Congolese basketball coach (born 1980)

Personal information
- Born: 21 September 1980 (age 45) Kinshasa, Zaire
- Coaching career: 2013–present

Career history
- 2015–2016: Petro de Luanda (assistant coach)
- 2016: Progresso Associação do Sambizanga (assistant)
- 2016–2017: Aix Maurienne Savoie Basket (assistant)
- 2017–2018: Levallois Metropolitans (assistant)
- 2017–2020: Angola national team (assistant)
- 2021: Patriots (assistant)
- 2020–2022: Nigeria national team (assistant)
- 2017–2020: Levallois Sporting Club (assistant)
- 2020–2022: Levallois Sporting Club
- 2022–2023: DR Congo national team
- 2022: Espoir Fukash (assistant)
- 2022–2023: Paris Basketball (assistant)
- 2023–2024: Austin Spurs (assistant)

Emmanuel Mavomo (born 21 September 1980) is a French - Congolese professional basketball coach. He has been an assistant coach for several club and national teams, in Africa, Europe and now in the United States.

== Early life ==
Born in Kinshasa, Mavomo was initially interested in football but switched to basketball after watching the United States' 1992 "Dream Team" play at the Olympics. Due to political unrest in his native country, the Democratic Republic of the Congo, Mavomo moved to South Africa. There, he lived in Cape Town and studied at the Cape Peninsula University of Technology, where he played for the university team. Mavomo also worked to pay for his studies. After moving to Johannesburg, Mavomo began working in marketing and later worked for the Basketball Without Borders initiative.

He is a holder of the French Federation of Basketball "Diplôme d'Etat" mention Basketball and Diplôme d'assistant video. He also underwent online course with smww.com in analytics, scouting and video editing for basketball

== Coaching career ==
=== Angola (2013–2016) ===
Mavomo picked up coaching in 2013, and moved to Angola and in 2015. There, he approached Petro de Luanda, one of the country's powerhouse basketball teams, and asked for a place as assistant under Lazare Adingono. Petro went on to win the 2015 FIBA Africa Clubs Champions Cup, as well as the Angolan League and Supercup that season. The following season, he coached for Progresso Associação do Sambizanga under accomplished coach Alberto de Carvalho.

=== France (2016–2021) ===
The same year, in 2016, Mavomo moved to France where he coached several teams. After being an assistant for Aix Maurienne Savoie Basket, he became head coach for Levallois Sporting Club. It was his first head coaching stint.

=== Basketball Africa League (2021–2022) ===
In the 2021 season, Mavomo was an assistant coach for the Rwanda-based Patriots under coach Alan Major. He returned to France after the season, to be an assistant for Paris Basketball of the LNB Pro A, the top-level league in the country. The following 2022 season, he was an assistant coach of Espoir Fukash, the representatives of his native DR Congo.

=== NBA G League (2023–2024) ===
He was a guest coach for the Utah Jazz in the 2023 NBA Summer League. In October 2023, Mavomo signed a contract with the U.S.-based Austin Spurs of the NBA G League. He re-united with Will Voigt and became the first former BAL coach to sign in the NBA G League.

=== National teams ===
From 2017 to 2020, Mavomo was an assistant coach for the Angola national team. Later, Mavomo also worked as an assistant for the Nigeria national team under NBA coach Mike Brown and participated in the 2020 Tokyo Olympics with Otis Hughley and the Nigerian Women Basketball team. In the end of 2022, he was the head coach of his native country DR Congo men's national basketball team during the 2023 World Cup African qualifiers.
