= 1996 FIBA Africa Clubs Champions Cup =

1996 FIBA Africa Champions Cup
15th FIBA Africa Champions Cup

Tournament details
- Host country: Egypt
- Teams: 4 (from 53 federations)
- Venue: 1 (in 1 host city)

Final positions
- Champions: Egypt (Gezira SC's 2nd title; Egypt's 4th title)

Official website
- 1996 FIBA Africa Champions Cup

The 1996 FIBA Africa Basketball Club Championship (15th edition), is an international basketball tournament held in Alexandria, Egypt. The tournament was contested by 4 clubs in a round robin system.

The tournament was won by Gezira SC from Egypt, thus retaining the title.

== Participating teams ==
(Egypt) Gezira SC
(South Africa) Johannesburg
(Central African Republic) Red Star
(Mali) Stade Malien
(Egypt) El Ittihad

== Preliminary rounds ==
First round
(Gabon) Ndzimba	105	54	159
(Democratic Republic of the Congo) ASB Onatra	88	85	173

Second round
(Central African Republic) Red Star	120	116	236
(Democratic Republic of the Congo) ASB Onatra	84	75	159
(Mali) Stade Malien	69	96	165
(Guinea) AS Kaloum	65	62	127
(Egypt) El Ittihad	69	96	165
(Nigeria) Ebun Comets	95	62	157
(Egypt) Gezira SC	101	72	173
(Kenya) Co-op Bank	54	69	123
(Mozambique) Maxaquene	–	–	–
(South Africa) Johannesburg	–	–	–

== Final round ==
=== Day 1 ===
18:00

El Ittihad (Egypt)	95–85	(Central African Republic) Red Star

20:00

Johannesburg (South Africa)	73–91	(Egypt) Gezira SC

=== Day 2 ===
18:00

Red Star (Central African Republic)	79–66	(Mali) Stade Malien

20:00

El Ittihad (Egypt)	88–71	(South Africa) Johannesburg

=== Day 3 ===
18:00

Red Star (Central African Republic)	113–90	(South Africa) Johannesburg

20:00

Gezira SC (Egypt)	97–77	(Mali) Stade Malien

=== Day 4 ===
18:00

Gezira SC (Egypt)	93–84	(Central African Republic) Red Star

20:00

Stade Malien (Mali)	67–89	(Egypt) El Ittihad

=== Day 5 ===
18:00

Johannesburg (South Africa)	88–92	(Mali) Stade Malien

20:00

Gezira SC (Egypt)	83–76	(Egypt) El Ittihad

== Final standings ==
Rank	Team	Record
Gold medal	(Egypt) Gezira SC	6–0
Silver medal	(Egypt) El Ittihad	5–1
Bronze medal	(Central African Republic) Red Star	4–2
4	(Mali) Stade Malien	4–2
5	(South Africa) Johannesburg	0–4

== All Tournament Team ==
1996 FIBA Africa Clubs Champions Cup

Gezira Sporting Club
2nd Title

== See also ==
1997 FIBA Africa Championship
