= New Generation Basketball =

New Generation
- Nickname: New Gen
- League: Liprobakin
- Founded: 2012
- History: New Generation Basketball (2012–present)
- Location: Kinshasa, DR Congo
- President: Édouard Lokanga
- General manager: Joe Lolonga Nkoi
- Head coach: Charly Buzangu

New Generation Basketball is a Congolese basketball team based in Kinshasa. The team was founded in 2012 and plays in the Liprobakin of Kinshasa, where it has won the city championship five times. In 2016, New Generation won the Coupe du Congo for the first time.

== History ==
New Generation was founded in 2012 by five young basketball enthousiast with the goal of mentoring African youths through sports education. It was born from the ashes of the Aurore Basketball Club, the phoenix in the logo of the team symbolises this.

In its debut season in the Liprobakin, the competition of Kinshasa, New Generation finished 8th. In 2015, they won their first city championship. They also went on to win the league in the next four seasons.

The following year, New Gen won their first-ever Coupe du Congo after beating Mazembe 62–48 in the final.

The team played in the 2017 FIBA Africa Clubs Champions Cup and finished in the 12th and last place.

== Notable players ==
- Yannick Nzosa (was recruited by Stella Azurra)

== Honours ==
Coupe du Congo

- Champions (1): 2016

Liprobakin

- Champions (5): 2015, 2016, 2017, 2018, 2019
