= FIBA Africa Basketball League =

Basketball league

- Organising body: FIBA Africa
- Founded: 1971
- First season: 1972
- Folded: 2019
- Replaced by: Basketball Africa League (BAL)
- Country: FIBA Africa member countries
- Confederation: FIBA Africa
- Number of teams: 4–16
- Level on pyramid: 1
- Last champions: (Angola) Primeiro de Agosto (9th title) (2019)
- Most championships: (Angola) Primeiro de Agosto (9 titles)

The FIBA Africa Basketball League (formerly named the FIBA Africa Clubs Champions Cup) was the highest caliber men's professional basketball competition for clubs until 2020, organized by the FIBA Africa and played by the champions of the leagues of the African countries. The league was replaced by the Basketball Africa League (BAL) from 2020.

== History ==
The competition was founded in 1971. A year later, in 1972, Hit Trésor SC won the inaugural championship. For the first 33 years in existence, it was a biennial league. From 2004, the ACC was held yearly.

Notable players who have played in the competition are Serge Ibaka and Bismack Biyombo, who both went on to play in the United States' National Basketball Association (NBA).

In February 2019, FIBA Africa announced the reformulation of the league, expanding it from 12 to 16 teams. The name of the tournament was changed to "FIBA Africa Basketball League", or "FIBA AfroLeague".

FIBA has in the past announced plans to expand the FIBA Intercontinental Cup to possibly include the champion teams from the FIBA Africa Basketball League, FIBA Asia Champions Cup, NBL from Australia, and possibly the NBA, at some point in the future.

== Results ==
The following is a list of all the winners of the FIBA Africa Basketball League. The most common final was between the Angolan arch-rivals Petro de Luanda and Primeiro de Agosto, who faced each other four times.

Edition	Year	Hosts	Champions	Score and Venue	Runners-up	Third place	Score and Venue	Fourth place	No. of teams
1	1972	(Central African Republic); Bangui	(Central African Republic); Red Star Ndongo	71–68	(Mali); Stade Malien	(Egypt); Zamalek		(Senegal); ASFA	4
2	1973	(Egypt); Cairo	(Central African Republic); Hit Trésor	61–55	(Senegal); Dial Diop	(Egypt); Gezira			
3	1975	(Egypt); Cairo	(Senegal); ASFA	78–69	(Egypt); Zamalek	(Central African Republic); Hit Trésor			
4	1976	(Central African Republic); Bangui	(Central African Republic); Hit Trésor	89–76	(Egypt); Zamalek	(Senegal); ASFA			
5	1979	(Central African Republic); Bangui	(Senegal); ASFA	77–76	(Cameroon); CAMAIR	(Central African Republic); Spot Club			
6	1981	(Mali); Bamako	(Senegal); ASFA	63–49	(Ivory Coast); ASEC Mimosas	(Mali); Stade Malien			
7	1983	(Senegal); Dakar	(Senegal); AS Police	78–74	(Senegal); ASFA	(Egypt); Zamalek			
8	1985	(Mozambique); Maputo	(Mozambique); Maxaquene	89–62	(Senegal); AS Police	(Nigeria); Kano Pillars			
9	1987	(Egypt); Alexandria	(Egypt); Al Ittihad Alexandria	86–83 (OT)	(Angola); Primeiro de Agosto	(Nigeria); Kano Pillars		(Ivory Coast); ABC	
10	1989	(Ivory Coast); Abidjan	(Ivory Coast); ASEC Mimosas	71–63	(Mali); Stade Malien	(Angola); Primeiro de Agosto	66–51	(Egypt); Al Ittihad Alexandria	
11	1991	(Senegal); Dakar	(Senegal); Jeanne d'Arc	69–64	(Cameroon); ONCPB	(Morocco); Wydad AC			
12	1992	(Egypt); Cairo	(Egypt); Zamalek	83–75	(Senegal); Jeanne d'Arc	(Ivory Coast); AS Biao			
13	1994	(Egypt); Cairo	(Egypt); Gezira	66–59	(Angola); Primeiro de Agosto	(Guinea); AS Kaloum Star			
14	1996	(Egypt); Alexandria	(Egypt); Gezira	Round-robin	(Egypt); Al Ittihad Alexandria	(Central African Republic); Red Star Ndongo	Round-robin	(Mali); Stade Malien	4
15	1998	(Morocco); Fez	(Morocco); MAS Fes	Round-robin	(Egypt); Zamalek	(Angola); ASA	Round-robin	(Egypt); Gezira	4
16	2000	(Ivory Coast); Abidjan	(Ivory Coast); ASEC Mimosas	63–61; Treichville Sports Palace	(Angola); Petro de Luanda	(Nigeria); Lagos Islanders	83–76; Treichville Sports Palace	(Democratic Republic of the Congo); Onatra	
17	2002	(Angola); Luanda	(Angola); Primeiro de Agosto	Round-robin	(Ivory Coast); ASEC Mimosas	(Republic of the Congo); Inter Club Brazzaville	Round-robin	(Gabon); Capo Libreville	7
18	2004	(Egypt); Cairo	(Angola); Primeiro de Agosto	71–53	(Ivory Coast); ABC	(Egypt); Al Ahly	59–56	(Angola); Petro de Luanda	7
19	2005	(Ivory Coast); Abidjan	(Ivory Coast); ABC	67–66	(Angola); Interclube	(Angola); Primeiro de Agosto	103–67	(Nigeria); Union Bank	7
20	2006	(Nigeria); Lagos	(Angola); Petro de Luanda	76–71	(Angola); Primeiro de Agosto	(Nigeria); Dodan Warriors	75–66	(Republic of the Congo); Inter Club Brazzaville	12
21	2007	(Angola); Luanda	(Angola); Primeiro de Agosto	61–53	(Angola); Petro de Luanda	(Ivory Coast); ABC	65–60	(Angola); Interclube	12
22	2008	(Tunisia); Sousse	(Angola); Primeiro de Agosto	57–54	(Tunisia); ES Sahel	(Angola); ASA	60–55	(Tunisia); Stade Nabeulien	12
23	2009	(Rwanda); Kigali	(Angola); Primeiro de Agosto	88–64	(Angola); Petro de Luanda	(Rwanda); APR	92–80	(Democratic Republic of the Congo); Mazembe	9
24	2010	(Benin); Cotonou	(Angola); Primeiro de Agosto	73–41	(Cameroon); Condor	(Morocco); AS Salé	75–71	(Democratic Republic of the Congo); Mazembe	12
25	2011	(Morocco); Salé	(Tunisia); ES Sahel	82–60	(Angola); Primeiro de Agosto	(Morocco); AS Salé	80–75	(Angola); Petro de Luanda	12
26	2012	(Equatorial Guinea); Malabo	(Angola); Primeiro de Agosto	80–69	(Angola); Petro de Luanda	(Egypt); Al Ahly	76–64	(Egypt); Al Ittihad Alexandria	12
27	2013	(Tunisia); Sousse	(Angola); Primeiro de Agosto	68–61	(Tunisia); ES Sahel	(Angola); Rec do Libolo	79–70	(Egypt); Sporting Alexandria	12
28	2014	(Tunisia); Tunis	(Angola); Rec do Libolo	86–68	(Tunisia); ES Radès	(Tunisia); Club Africain	79–74	(Egypt); Sporting Alexandria	11
29	2015	(Angola); Luanda	(Angola); Petro de Luanda	89–75; Pavilhão Multiusos de Luanda	(Angola); Rec do Libolo	(Morocco); AS FAR	72–62; Pavilhão Multiusos de Luanda	(Angola); Primeiro de Agosto	10
30	2016	(Egypt); Cairo	(Egypt); Al Ahly	68–66; Al Ahly Sports Hall	(Angola); Rec do Libolo	(Morocco); AS Salé	88–76; Al Ahly Sports Hall	(Nigeria); Kano Pillars	10
31	2017	(Tunisia); Radès	(Morocco); AS Salé	77–69; Salle Omnisport de Radès	(Tunisia); ES Radès	(Tunisia); US Monastir	77–74; Salle Omnisport de Radès	(Angola); Benfica Libolo	12
32	2019	(Angola); Luanda	(Angola); Primeiro de Agosto	83–71; Kilamba Arena	(Morocco); AS Salé	(Egypt); Smouha	69–58; Kilamba Arena	(Tunisia); JS Kairouan	16

== Medals by country ==
Rank	Nation	Gold	Silver	Bronze	Total
1	Angola	12	11	5	28
2	Egypt	5	4	6	15
3	Senegal	5	4	1	10
4	Ivory Coast	3	3	2	8
5	Central African Republic	3	0	3	6
6	Morocco	2	1	5	8
7	Tunisia	1	4	2	7
8	Mozambique	1	0	0	1
9	Mali	0	2	1	3
10	Nigeria	0	0	4	4
11	Congo	0	0	1	1
11	Guinea	0	0	1	1
11	Rwanda	0	0	1	1
Totals (13 entries)		32	29	32	93

== MVP award winner ==
Year	Winner
2002	(Angola) Abdel Bouckar
2004	?
2005	(Ivory Coast) Stéphane Konaté
2006	(Angola) Mílton Barros
2007	(Angola) Olímpio Cipriano
2008	(Angola) Joaquim Gomes "Kikas"
2009	(Angola) Vladimir Ricardino
2010	(Angola) Joaquim Gomes "Kikas"
2011	(Tunisia) Makrem Ben Romdhane
2012	(Angola) Carlos Morais
2013	(United States) Cedric Isom
2014	(Angola) Eduardo Mingas
2015	(Dominican Republic) Manny Quezada
2016	(United States) Wayne Arnold
2017	(Morocco) Abdelhakim Zouita
2018–19	(Angola) Eduardo Mingas

== Clubs performance ==
Club		(Egypt)	(Morocco)	(Ivory Coast)	(Angola)	(Egypt)	(Ivory Coast)	(Nigeria)	(Angola)	(Tunisia)	(Rwanda)	(Benin)	(Morocco)	(Equatorial Guinea)	(Tunisia)	(Tunisia)	(Angola)	(Egypt)	(Tunisia)	
Club	1972–1994	1996	1998	2000	2002	2004	2005	2006	2007	2008	2009	2010	2011	2012	2013	2014	2015	2016	2017	
Club		5	4	?	7	7	7	12	12	12	9	11	12	12	12	11	10	10	12	12
(Ivory Coast) Abidjan Basket Club					5	2004	2005	6	2007					8		11				7
(Cape Verde) AD Bairro																	8			1
(Ivory Coast) Africa Sports								9												1
(Egypt) Al Ahly Cairo						2004								2012				2016		3
(Libya) Al Ahly Benghazi												11	9		8					3
(Egypt) Al Gezira Cairo	1973 1994	1996	4														6			5
(Egypt) Al-Ittihad Alexandria	1987	2 1996												4						3
(Morocco) Al Hoceima													6							1
(Libya) Al Shabab										6										1
(Rwanda) APR									6	8	2009									3
(Senegal) AS Douanes						7														1
(Senegal) AS Police	1983 1985																			2
(Morocco) AS Salé												2010	2011					2016	2017	4
(Togo) AS Swallows										9										1
(Angola) ASA			3 1998							2008										2
(Democratic Republic of the Congo) ASB Kauka									8											1
(Democratic Republic of the Congo) ASB Mazembe											4	4	5	11		7			10	6
(Democratic Republic of the Congo) ASB New Generation																			12	1
(Madagascar) ASCUT																	10			1
(Ivory Coast) ASEC Mimosas	1981 1989			1 2000	2002															4
(Senegal) ASFA	1975 1976 1979 1981 1983																			5
(Benin) ASO Modele												10								1
(Benin) ASPAC									10		6									2
(Guinea) BACK							7	11		11										3
(Democratic Republic of the Congo) BC Onatra								10	7	10										3
(France) BC M'Tsapere (Note: BC M'Tsapere is a club from Mayotte, an island off the African southeast coast under French rule.)																8				1
(Cameroon) BEAC																		7		1
(Cameroon) CAMAIR	1979																			1
(Gabon) Capo Libreville					4															1
(Uganda) City Oilers																		9	5	2
(Tunisia) Club Africain																2014		5		2
(Cameroon) Condor de Yaoundé												2010								1
(Kenya) Co-op Bank											8									1
(Algeria) CS Constantine															5					1
(Senegal) Dial Diop	1973																			1
(Nigeria) Dodan Warriors								2006												1
(Nigeria) Ebun Comets						6														1
(Tunisia) ES du Sahel										2008			2011	6	2013					4
(Tunisia) ES Radès																2014	5		2017	3
(South Africa) ESPN / AND 1								5												1
(Rwanda) Espoir														12						1
(Morocco) FAR Rabat																	2015			1
(Mozambique) Ferroviário da Beira									12						10				6	3
(Nigeria) Gombe Bulls																			11	1
(Algeria) GS Pétroliers																		6	8	2
(Central African Republic) Hit Trésor	1973 1975 1976																			3
(Angola) Interclube							2005		4										7	3
(Republic of the Congo) Inter Club Brazzaville					2002		6	4			7	8					9			6
(Senegal) Jeanne d'Arc	1991 1992																			2
(South Africa) Johannesburg		5																		2
(Nigeria) Kano Pillars	1985 1987									5	5	5		9	9		7	4	9	10
(Kenya) KCB Lions								12												1
Kenya Ports Authority					7															1
(Liberia) LPRC Oilers															12					1
(Democratic Republic of the Congo) Lupopo										12										1
(Equatorial Guinea) Malabo Kings													12		7	10				3
(Gabon) Manga BB												6		7						2
(Nigeria) Mark Mentors																9				1
(Morocco) MAS Fez	1987		1 1998																	2
(Mozambique) Maxaquene	1985 1991											7								3
(Guinea) MBC Conakry									9											1
(Equatorial Guinea) Mongomo BC														10						1
(Nigeria) Niger Potters									5											1
(Cameroon) Nzui Manto																		10		1
(Cameroon) ONCPB	1991																			1
(Nigeria) Plateau Peaks								7												1
(Angola) Petro Atlético	1994			2000		4	5	2006	2007		2009		4	2012			2015			11
(Angola) Primeiro de Agosto	1987 1989				2002	2004	2005	2006	2007	2008	2009	2010	2011	2012	2013	6	4	8		16
(Angola) Recreativo do Libolo													7	5	2013	2014	2015	2016	4	7
(Central African Republic) Red Star	1972	3 1996																		2
(Nigeria) Royal Hoopers												9	11							2
(Egypt) Sporting Alexandria															4	4				2
(Mali) Stade Malien	1972 1981 1989	4			6	5			11											7
(Tunisia) Stade Nabeulien										4										1
(Gabon) Tali															6					1
(Nigeria) Union Bank							4			7			8							3
(Burundi) Urunani													10		11					2
(Tunisia) US Monastir																5			2017	2
(Uganda) Kyambogo Warriors											9									1
(Egypt) Zamalek SC	1971 1975 1976 1983 1992		2 1998																	6
(Ivory Coast) Zenith								8												1
# Teams		1996 5	1998 4	2000 ?	2002 7	2004 6	2005 7	2006 12	2007 12	2008 12	2009 9	2010 11	2011 12	2012 12	2013 12	2014 11	2015 10	2016 10	2017 12	

== See also ==
- FIBA Africa Championship
- Basketball in Africa
- Basketball Africa League
