= Condor BC =

Condor
- Leagues: Elite Messieurs
- History: Cèdres (?–2004); Condor BC (2004–present)
- Location: Yaoundé, Cameroon
- Head coach: Jean Denys Mbel
- Championships: 4 (2007, 2008, 2011, 2019)
| Home | Away |

Condor Basketball Club, also known as Condor or Condor de Yaoundé, is a Cameroonian basketball club from Yaoundé. The team plays in the top level Elite Messieurs and is a national league champion in 2007, 2008, 2011, and 2019.

== History ==
Founded as Cèdres, the team later changed their name to Condor.

The best achievement in the history of Condor was the second place in the 2010 FIBA Africa Clubs Champions Cup. With a impressive campaign, the team beat Kano Pillars in the quarterfinals and AS Salé in the semi-finals. However, in the finals Angolan powerhouse Primeiro de Agosto was too strong for the Cameroonian club.

In 2019, Condor won its second national title.

== Honours ==
Elite Messieurs

- Champions (4): 2007, 2008, 2010–11, 2018–19

Cup of Cameroon

- Winners (2): 2010, 2019

FIBA Africa Clubs Champions Cup

- Runners-up (1): 2010
