= 2004 FIBA Africa Clubs Champions Cup =

2004 FIBA Africa Champions Cup
19th FIBA Africa Champions Cup

Tournament details
- Host country: Egypt
- Dates: November 20 – 27
- Teams: 7 (from 53 federations)
- Venue: 1 (in 1 host city)

Final positions
- Champions: Angola (2nd title)

Official website
- Official Website

The 2004 FIBA Africa Basketball Club Championship (19th edition), was an international basketball tournament held in Cairo, Egypt, from November 20 to 27, 2004. The tournament, organized by FIBA Africa and hosted by Al Ahly, was contested by 7 teams in two groups, in a preliminary round robin system followed by a knockout stage.

The tournament was won by Primeiro de Agosto from Angola.

== Draw ==
| Group A | Group B |
|---|---|
| (Senegal) AS Douanes (Egypt) Al Ahly (Nigeria) Ebun Comets (Angola) Petro Atlético | (Ivory Coast) Abidjan Basket Club (Angola) Primeiro de Agosto (Mali) Stade Malien |

== Preliminary round ==
Times given below are in UTC+2.

=== Group A ===
| Qualified for the semi-finals |

| | Team | M | W | L | PF | PA | Diff | P |
|---|---|---|---|---|---|---|---|---|
| 1. | (Angola) Petro Atlético | 3 | 3 | 0 | 195 | 147 | +48 | 6 |
| 2. | (Egypt) Al Ahly | 3 | 2 | 1 | 227 | 185 | +42 | 5 |
| 3. | (Nigeria) Ebun Comets | 3 | 1 | 2 | 169 | 212 | -43 | 4 |
| 4. | (Senegal) AS Douanes | 3 | 0 | 3 | 160 | 207 | -47 | 3 |

November 20, 2004
20:00

Boxscore

| Al Ahly (Egypt) | 76–58 | (Senegal) AS Douanes |
Scoring by quarter: 23–13, 21–17, 13–11, 19–17

November 21, 2004
16:00

Boxscore

| Petro Atlético (Angola) | 68–38 | (Nigeria) Ebun Comets |
Scoring by quarter: 14–2, 24–15, 13–15, 17–6

November 22, 2004
18:00

Boxscore

| AS Douanes (Senegal) | 47–62 | (Angola) Petro Atlético |
Scoring by quarter: 10-20, 19-10, 10-17, 8-15

16:00

Boxscore

| Ebun Comets (Nigeria) | 62–89 | (Egypt) Al Ahly |
Scoring by quarter: 24-25, 19-8, 21-23, 16-19

November 23, 2004
18:00

Boxscore

| AS Douanes (Senegal) | 55–69 | (Nigeria) Ebun Comets |
Scoring by quarter: 14–18, 9–18, 20–13, 12–20

20:00

Boxscore

| Al Ahly (Egypt) | 62–65 | (Angola) Petro Atlético |
Scoring by quarter: 16-21, 18-15, 18-12, 10-17

=== Group B ===
| Qualified for the semi-finals |

| | Team | M | W | L | PF | PA | Diff | P |
|---|---|---|---|---|---|---|---|---|
| 1. | (Angola) Primeiro de Agosto | 2 | 2 | 0 | 157 | 118 | +39 | 4 |
| 2. | (Ivory Coast) Abidjan Basket Club | 2 | 1 | 1 | 121 | 141 | -20 | 3 |
| 3. | (Mali) Stade Malien | 2 | 0 | 2 | 127 | 146 | -19 | 2 |

November 21, 2004
16:00

Boxscore

| 1º de Agosto | 79–64 | (Mali) Stade Malien |
Scoring by quarter: n/a
| Pts: Muzadi 14 | | Pts: Traore 19 |

November 22, 2004
16:00

| Abidjan BC (Ivory Coast) | 54–78 | (Angola) 1º de Agosto |
Scoring by quarter: 8-24, 15-12
| Pts: n/a | | Pts: Lutonda 18 |

November 23, 2004
14:00

| Stade Malien (Mali) | 63–67 | (Ivory Coast) Abidjan BC |

== Knockout stage ==
Semifinals
25 November
(Angola) Petro Atlético | 56
(Ivory Coast) ABC | 64
25 November
(Angola) 1º de Agosto | 67
(Egypt) Al Ahly | 64

Final
27 November
(Angola) 1º de Agosto | 71
(Ivory Coast) ABC | 53
Bronze medal game
27 November
(Angola) Petro Atlético | 56
(Egypt) Al Ahly | 59

=== 5th place match ===
November 25, 2004
16:00

| Stade Malien (Mali) | 54–73 | (Nigeria) Ebun Comets |
Scoring by quarter: n/a

=== Semifinals ===
November 25, 2004
18:00

| Petro Atlético (Angola) | 56–67 | (Ivory Coast) Abidjan BC |
Scoring by quarter: n/a
| Pts: Selengue 16 | | Pts: Affi 18 |

20:00

| Al Ahly (Egypt) | 64–67 | (Angola) 1º de Agosto |
Scoring by quarter: n/a
| Pts: El-Ghannam 15 | | Pts: Olímpio 20 |

=== Bronze medal game ===
November 27, 2004
18:00

| Al Ahly (Egypt) | 59–56 | (Angola) Petro Atlético |
Scoring by quarter: n/a

=== Final ===
November 27, 2004
20:00

| 1º de Agosto (Angola) | 71–53 | (Ivory Coast) Abidjan BC |
Scoring by quarter: 12–20, 19-9
| Pts: Olímpio 21 | | Pts: Touali 17 |

== Final standings ==
| Rank | Team | Record |
|---|---|---|
| Gold medal | (Angola) Primeiro de Agosto | 4–0 |
| Silver medal | (Ivory Coast) Abidjan Basket Club | 2–2 |
| Bronze medal | (Egypt) Al Ahly | 3–2 |
| 4 | (Angola) Petro Atlético | 3–2 |
| 5 | (Nigeria) Ebun Comets | 2–2 |
| 6 | (Mali) Stade Malien | 0–3 |
| 7 | (Senegal) AS Douanes | 0–3 |

== All Tournament Team ==
2004 FIBA Africa Clubs Champions Cup

Clube Desportivo Primeiro de Agosto
2nd Title

Most Valuable Player

== See also ==
2005 FIBA Africa Championship
