= ASEC Mimosas (basketball) =

Basketball team in Abidjan, Ivory Coast

- Nickname: Les Mimosas (The Mimosas); Noir et Jaunes (Black and Yellows)
- Founded: 1948; 77 years ago
- Arena: Palais des Sports de Treichville
- Capacity: 7,000
- Location: Abidjan, Ivory Coast
- Championships: 2 African Clubs Championships
Home

ASEC Mimosas is a professional basketball team that is based in Abidjan, Ivory Coast. They used to compete in the Ivorian Basketball Championship. Mimosas is a two-time African continental champion, having won the FIBA Africa Clubs Champions Cup in 1989 and 2000.

== Honours ==
- FIBA Africa Clubs Champions Cup (2)
  - Champion: 1989 and 2000
  - Runners-up: 1981 and 2002

== Notable players ==
Note: Flags indicate national team eligibility at FIBA-sanctioned events. Players may hold other non-FIBA nationalities not displayed.

Criteria

To appear in this section a player must have either:

- Set a club record or won an individual award while at the club
- Played at least one official international match for their national team at any time
- Played at least one official NBA match at any time.

- Djadji Clément
- Amadou Dioum
- Fofana Lassina
- Malick Daho
- Ello Dingui
- Tapé Williams
