= BC Terreur =

- Leagues: Liprobakin
- Founded: 1963
- History: BC Terreur; 1963–present
- Arena: Martyrs Sports Complex
- Capacity: 2,000
- Location: Kinshasa, DR Congo
Home	Away

Basket Club Terreur (in English: Terror Basketball Club) is a Congolese basketball club based in Kinshasa. Founded in 1963, they play in the Liprobakin of Kinshasa. The team made its debut in the Africa Basketball League in the 2018–19 season. Terreur lost all three games, finishing last in the group.

Terreur has won one Congolese national championship (in 1992), and four Liprobakin titles (1992, 2014, 2020, and 2022).

== Honours ==
=== Domestic ===
Coupe du Congo

- Champion (1): 1992
  - Runners-up (4): 2017, 2018, 2022, 2024

=== Regional ===
Liprobakin

- Champion (4): 1992, 2014, 2020, 2022

== In African competitions ==
FIBA Africa Basketball League (1 appearances)

2018–19 – Group Stage (0–3)
