= FIBA Africa Championship 1997 =

Tournament details
- Host country: Senegal
- City: Dakar
- Dates: 25 July – 3 August
- Teams: 9
- Venue: 1 (in 1 host city)

Final positions
- Champions: Senegal (5th title)
- Runners-up: Nigeria
- Third place: Angola
- Fourth place: Egypt

Tournament statistics
- MVP: (Senegal) Oumar Mar

The FIBA Africa Championship 1997 was hosted by Senegal from July 25 to August 3, 1997. The games were played in Dakar. The top two countries in this FIBA Africa Championship earned the two berths allocated to Africa for the 1998 FIBA World Championship in Greece. Senegal won the tournament, the country's 5th African championship and first since 1980, by beating Nigeria 69-48 in the final. Both teams qualified for the 1998 FIBA World Championship.

== Teams ==
The following national teams competed:

Group A	Group B
Central African Republic (Ivory Coast) Côte d'Ivoire; Nigeria; Senegal; South Africa	Angola; Egypt; Mali; Cape Verde

== Preliminary rounds ==
=== Group A ===
Team	Pts	Pld	W	L	PF	PA	Diff
Nigeria	8	4	4	0	320	193	+127
Senegal	7	4	3	1	285	226	+59
Central African Republic	6	4	2	2	269	258	+11
(Ivory Coast) Côte d'Ivoire	5	4	1	3	272	314	-42
South Africa	4	4	0	4	172	327	-155

Day 1

Senegal	82–41	South Africa
Côte d'Ivoire (Ivory Coast)	58–87	Central African Republic

Day 2

Central African Republic	57–70	Senegal
Côte d'Ivoire (Ivory Coast)	59–93	Nigeria

Day 3

Central African Republic	57–77	Nigeria
Côte d'Ivoire (Ivory Coast)	77–39	South Africa

Day 4

Central African Republic	68–53	South Africa
Nigeria	50–38	Senegal

Day 5

Senegal	95–78	(Ivory Coast) Côte d'Ivoire
Nigeria	100–39	South Africa

=== Group B ===
Team	Pts	Pld	W	L	PF	PA	Diff
Angola	6	3	3	0	198	135	+63
Egypt	5	3	2	1	184	195	-11
Mali	4	3	1	2	192	192	0
Cape Verde	3	3	0	3	134	186	-52

Day 1

Egypt	83–82	Mali
Angola	67–43	Cape Verde

Day 2

Mali	61–40	Cape Verde
Angola	62–43	Egypt

Day 3

Cape Verde	51–58	Egypt
Angola	69–49	Mali

== Knockout stage ==
Semi-finals
August 2, 1997
Egypt	51
Nigeria	61
August 2, 1997
Senegal	53
Angola	47

Final
August 3, 1997
Nigeria	48
Senegal	69
Third place
August 3, 1997
Egypt	55
Angola	79

== Classification Stage ==
Central African Republic	66–64	Mali
Côte d'Ivoire (Ivory Coast)	48–68	Cape Verde

== Final standings ==
Rank	Team	Record
1	Senegal	5-1
2	Nigeria	5-1
3	Angola	4-1
4	Egypt	2-3
5	Central African Republic	3-2
6	Mali	1-3
7	Cape Verde	1-3
8	(Ivory Coast) Côte d'Ivoire	1-4
9	South Africa	0-4

Senegal and Nigeria qualified for the 1998 FIBA World Championship in Athens.

== Awards ==
1997 FIBA Africa Championship winners

Senegal
Fifth title

Most Valuable Player
(Senegal) Oumar Mar

== See also ==
- 1996 FIBA Africa Clubs Champions Cup
