= Paulo Barros (basketball) =

Angolan basketball player (born 1989)

No. 9 – Interclube
- Position: Small forward
- League: BAI Basket; Africa Champions Cup

Personal information
- Born: 13 March 1989 (age 37) Caconda, Cabinda, Angola
- Listed height: 195 cm (6 ft 5 in)

Career history
- 2006: G.D. Banca Cabinda
- 2013: Petro Atlético
- 2013–present: Interclube
Medals
Men's basketball
FIBA Africa Under-18 Championship
Bronze medal – third place	Durban 2006	Angola U18
FIBA Africa Clubs Champions Cup
Silver medal – second place	Malabo 2012	Petro Atlético

Paulo Barros (born 13 March 1989) is an Angolan professional basketball player who has represented his country internationally. Barros, who stands at 195 cm (6 ft 5 in), plays as a small forward.

Born in Caconda, Cabinda, Barros competed for the Angola national basketball team at the 2012 FIBA World Olympic Qualifying Tournament for Men. He played for the Atlético Petróleos de Luanda side that won silver in the 2012 FIBA Africa Clubs Champions Cup.

He currently plays for Angolan side Interclube at the Angolan basketball league BAI Basket.
