= Cedric Isom =

American basketball player (born 1984)

Personal information
- Born: June 4, 1984 (age 42) Beaumont, Texas
- Listed height: 1.88 m (6 ft 2 in)

Career information
- High school: Newton (Newton, Texas)
- College: East Texas Baptist (2003–2006)
- NBA draft: 2007: undrafted
- Playing career: 2003–present
- Position: Point guard / shooting guard

Career history
- 2007–2009: Þór Akureyri
- 2009–2010: APR
- 2010: Tindastóll
- 2010–2012: Petro de Luanda
- 2012–2016: Primeiro de Agosto
- 2017–2018: Galitos Barreiro
- 2018–2020: Al Jazeera Abu Dhabi
- 2020: APR

Career highlights
- 2× ACC champion (2012, 2013); ACC Most Valuable Player (2013); 2× ACC All-Star Team (2012, 2013); 2× Angolan League champion (2011, 2016); Angolan League MVP (2013); Rwandan League champion (2010); 3× ASC East Player of the Year (2003–2006)

Cedric Wesley Isom (born June 6, 1984) is an American basketball player who last played for APR of the Rwanda National Basketball League.

== Career ==
Born in Newton, Texas, he graduated from East Texas Baptist in 2006. Isom has played in Iceland, Rwanda, Angola, Portugal and the United Arab Emirates. He won the Angolan League championship in 2011, 2013 and 2016.

Isom started his career with Úrvalsdeild Karla club Þór Akureyri in 2007 and quickly became one of the leagues best players. He averaged 26.1 points, 7.0 rebounds and 5.5 assists during the regular season, helping Þór reach the playoffs. In the playoffs, Þór lost to eventual champions Keflavík in two games. He returned to Þór the following season but broke his hand in December 2008. After the injury did not heal as hoped, Isom was released in February 2009.

In February 2010, Isom signed with Tindastóll for the rest of the season. He appeared in eight regular season games, averaging 28.6 points, 7.1 rebounds and 8.5 assists per game. He scored a season high 48 points against Snæfell on 4 March 2010. In the playoffs, he averaged 20.3 points, 6.7 rebounds and 7.3 assists per game in a 1–2 series loss against Keflavík.

In 2018, Isom signed in the United Arab Emirates with Al Jazeera.

In October 2020, Isom returned to APR in Rwanda for a second stint.

== National team career ==
In 2013, Isom joined the Rwanda national basketball team to prepare for the AfroBasket 2013 tournament, however he was not included in the final roster.

== Achievements ==
- 2003–2006 3-time ASC East Division Player of the Year
- 2011–2012 Africa Club Champion with 1º de Agosto
- 2012–2013 BAI Basket champion with 1º de Agosto
- 2012–2013 BAI Basket MVP with 1º de Agosto
- 2013–2014 Africa Clubs Champions Cup MVP with 1º de Agosto
