= Manga BB =

- Leagues: Gabonese Division 1
- Location: Moanda, Gabon
- Main sponsor: COMILOG
- President: Olivier Tessier
- Head coach: John Masnoudji
Home

Manga Basket-Ball, also known as Manga BB or simply Manga, is a Gabonese basketball club based in Moanda. The club has been active internationally representing Gabon in the FIBA Africa Basketball League. The team is founded and sponsored by manganese mining company Compagnie minière de l'Ogooué (COMILOG). The club name is derived from manganese, which is the chemical element the company mines.

== Honours ==
Gabonese Cup: 1

2019

== In international competitions ==
FIBA Africa Clubs Champions Cup

- 2010 – 6th Place
- 2012 – 7th Place

BAL Qualifiers

- 2020 – second round
