= Olímpio Cipriano =

Angolan basketball player (born 1982)

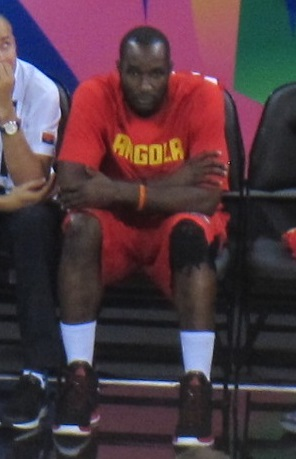
- Cipriano in 2014

No. 32 – Petro de Luanda
- Position: Forward
- League: BIC Basket; Basketball Africa League

Personal information
- Born: 9 April 1982 (age 44) Luanda, Angola
- Listed height: 1.93 m (6 ft 4 in)
- Listed weight: 93 kg (205 lb)

Career information
- NBA draft: 2004: undrafted
- Playing career: 2000–present

Career history
- n/a: Sporting de Luanda
- 2000–2009: Primeiro de Agosto
- 2009–2018: Benfica do Libolo
- 2018–present: Petro de Luanda
Medals
Men's basketball
Representing Angola
AfroBasket
Gold medal – first place	Algiers 2005	National Team
Gold medal – first place	Luanda 2007	National Team
Gold medal – first place	Benghazi 2009	National Team
Gold medal – first place	Abidjan 2013	National Team
FIBA Africa Clubs Champions Cup
Gold medal – first place	Luanda 2002	1º de Agosto
Gold medal – first place	Cairo 2004	1º de Agosto
Gold medal – first place	Luanda 2007	1º de Agosto
Gold medal – first place	Sousse 2008	1º de Agosto
Silver medal – second place	Lagos 2006	1º de Agosto
Silver medal – second place	Luanda 2015	Rec do Libolo
Bronze medal – third place	Abidjan 2005	1º de Agosto
Bronze medal – third place	Sousse 2013	Rec do Libolo

Olímpio Cipriano (born 9 April 1982) is an Angolan basketball player who currently plays for Petro de Luanda and the Angola national team. A 6 ft 4 in (1.93 m) guard, he has been one of the most decorated basketball players in Angolan history, having won 12 Angolan Leagues and 11 Angolan Cups in his career.

Born in Luanda, Cipriano represented the Angola national basketball team on several international tournaments and won four gold AfroBasket medals for his country. Cipriano also won five FIBA Africa Clubs Champions Cup titles, four with Primeiro and one with Libolo; he was honoured as MVP of the tournament in 2007.

== Professional career ==
Cipriano played with the Detroit Pistons' summer league team before being cut prior to the start of the 2007–08 NBA season.

== National team career ==
Cipriano played with Angola on several tournaments, including the 2004 Summer Olympics and the FIBA Africa Championship 2005. At the 2005 tournament, Cipriano led the Angolans to defeat Senegal to capture first place for the 4th championship in a row. Cipriano was also MVP of the tournament. He was also a member of the Angola squad at the 2006 FIBA World Championship, where he averaged 13.8 points per game, including a high of 33 in a losing effort against Germany.

== Awards and accomplishments ==
=== Club ===
Primeiro de Agosto

- 4× FIBA Africa Clubs Champions Cup: (2002, 2004, 2007, 2008)
- 8× Angolan League: (2001, 2002, 2003, 2004, 2005, 2008, 2009, 2022)
- 6× Taça de Angola: (2002, 2003, 2005, 2006, 2009, 2022)
- 9× Angolan Super Cup: (2001, 2002, 2003, 2004, 2005, 2007, 2008, 2009, 2021)

Benfica do Libolo

- FIBA Africa Clubs Champions Cup: (2014)
- 3× Angolan League: (2012, 2014, 2017)
- 5× Taça de Angola: (2010, 2011, 2015, 2016, 2017)
- 3× Angolan Super Cup: (2012, 2016, 2017)
- Taça Victorino Cunha: (2013)

Petro de Luanda

- 2× Angolan League: (2019, 2021)
- Taça de Angola: (2022)

=== Individual ===
- FIBA Africa Clubs Champions Cup MVP: (2007)
- 2× FIBA Africa Clubs Champions Cup All-Star Team: (2007, 2012)
- 4× Angolan League MVP: (2008, 2011, 2012, 2017)
- 3× Angolan League Top Scorer: (2007, 2008, 2012)
- Angolan League assists leader: (2011)

== Career statistics ==
Legend
GP	Games played	GS	Games started	MPG	Minutes per game
FG%	Field goal percentage	3P%	3-point field goal percentage	FT%	Free throw percentage
RPG	Rebounds per game	APG	Assists per game	SPG	Steals per game
BPG	Blocks per game	PPG	Points per game	**Bold**	Career high

=== BAL ===
Year	Team	GP	GS	MPG	FG%	3P%	FT%	RPG	APG	SPG	BPG	PPG
2021	Petro de Luanda	6	0	15.9	.359	.324	.750	2.3	1.0	.3	.0	7.0
Career		6	0	15.9	.359	.324	.750	2.3	1.0	.3	.0	7.0
