= Inter Club Brazzaville (basketball) =

Congolese basketball club based in Brazzaville

- Founded: 1967; 59 years ago
- Location: Brazzaville, Republic of the Congo
Home

Inter Club Brazzaville, commonly known as Inter Club, is a Congolese basketball club based in Brazzaville. The team is most known as being the first club of NBA player Serge Ibaka.

== Honours ==
FIBA Africa Basketball League

- Third place: 2002
- Fourth place: 2006

== In African competitions ==
FIBA Africa Clubs Champions Cup (6 appearances)

2002 – (bronze) 3rd place
2005 – 7th place
2006 – 4th place
2009 – 7th place
2010 – 8th place
2015 – 9th place

== Players ==
=== Notable players ===
Note: Flags indicate national team eligibility at FIBA-sanctioned events. Players may hold other non-FIBA nationalities not displayed.

Criteria

To appear in this section a player must have either:

- Set a club record or won an individual award while at the club
- Played at least one official international match for their national team at any time
- Played at least one official NBA match at any time.

- (Republic of the Congo) Bertrand Boukinda
- (Republic of the Congo) Japhie Nguia
- (Central African Republic) Max Kouguere
- (Spain) Serge Ibaka
