= Coupe du Congo (basketball) =

Basketball championship in the Democratic Republic of the Congo

- Organising body: FEBACO
- Founded: 1982
- First season: 1982
- Countries: Democratic Republic of the Congo
- Confederation: FIBA Africa
- Number of teams: Men: 17; Women: 8
- Current champions: Men: SCTP (19th title); Women: CNSS (4th title) (2025)
- Most championships: Men: SCTP (19 titles); Women: Vita Club (10 titles)

The Coupe du Congo (fully the Coupe de république démocratique du Congo de basket-ball; in English: Cup of Congo) is the national cup basketball championship in the Democratic Republic of the Congo. The competitions is played by the top two teams from the regional league in the country. It is the only annual competition organised by the Democratic Republic of Congo Basketball Federation (FEBACO). The cup is organised since 1985.

In 2022, 17 men's team and 8 women's team competed. The teams are divided in two groups for the first stage, the top four teams advance to the semifinals.

In the men's category SCTP holds the record for most wins with 19 cups, while in the women's category Vita Club has won a record 10 titles.

== Men's champions ==
Edition	Year	Champions	Score	Runners-up	Host city	Ref.
1	1982	Matonge			Kinshasa, Lubumbashi	
–	1983	Not held				
–	1984	Not held				
2	1985	SCTP			Kinshasa	
3	1986	SCTP (2)			Lubumbashi	
4	1987	SCTP (3)			Kinshasa	
5	1988	Mwanga			Lubumbashi	
6	1989	Matonge (2)			Kisangani	
7	1990	Cité de Jeunes			Kinshasa	
8	1991	Cité de Jeunes (2)			Lubumbashi	
9	1992	Terreur			Kinshasa	
10	1993	Mazembe			Lubumbashi	
11	1994	SCTP (4)			Kinshasa	
12	1995	SCTP (5)			Kinshasa	
13	1996	Molokaï			Lubumbashi	
14	1997	SCTP (6)			Lubumbashi	
–	1998	Not held				
15	1999-I	SCTP (7)			Kinshasa	
16	1999-II	SCTP (8)			Kinshasa	
17	2000	SCTP (9)			Matadi	
18	2001	SCTP (10)			Mbuji Mayi	
19	2002	SCTP (11)			Lubumbashi	
20	2003	SCTP (12)			Kinshasa	
21	2004	SCTP (13)			Kananga	
22	2005	SCTP (14)			Kananga	
23	2006	Kauka			Kinshasa	
24	2007	SCTP (15)			Kinshasa	
25	2008	Mazembe (2)			Lubumbashi	
26	2009	Mazembe (3)			Lubumbashi	
27	2010	Mazembe (4)			Kinshasa	
28	2011	Mazembe (5)	67–60	Molokai	Kinshasa	
29	2012	SCTP (16)			Kinshasa	
30	2013	Mazembe (6)			Kinshasa	
31	2014	Mazembe (7)			Kinshasa	
32	2015	SCTP (17)			Kinshasa	
33	2016	New Generation			Kinshasa	
34	2017	Mazembe (8)	56–49	Terreur	Kinshasa	
35	2018	SCTP (18)	64–56	Terreur	Kinshasa	
36	2019	Mazembe (9)	84–59	SCTP	Kinshasa	
37	2020	Mazembe (10)	76–46	DCMP	Kinshasa	
38	2021	Espoir Fukash	59–48	SCTP	Kinshasa	
39	2022	V.Club	70–62	Terreur	Lubumbashi, LIkasi	
40	2023	Virunga	73–70	Ami BK	Goma	
41	2024	Chaux Sport	73–65	Terreur	Kinshasa	
42	2025	SCTP (19)	71–48	Mwanga	Lubumbashi	

=== Performance by club ===
Club	Winners	Runners-up	Years won	Years runners-up
SCTP	19	2	1985, 1986, 1987, 1994, 1995, 1997, 1999–2005, 2007, 2012, 2015, 2018, 2025	2019, 2021
Mazembe	10	0	1993, 2008, 2009, 2010, 2011, 2013, 2014, 2017, 2019, 2020	–
Terreur	1	4	1992	2017, 2018, 2022, 2024
Matonge	2	0	1982, 1989	–
Cité des Jeunes	2	0	1990, 1991	–
Chaux Sport	1	0	2024	–
Virunga	1	0	2023	–
V.Club	1	0	2022	–
Espoir Fukash	1	0	2021	–
New Generation	1	0	2017	–
Kauka	1	0	2006	–
Molokaï	1	0	1996	–
Mwanga	1	0	1988	–
DCMP	0	1	–	2020
Ami BK	0	1	–	2023
Mwanga	0	1	–	2025

== Women's champions ==
Edition	Year	Champions	Score	Runners-up	Ref.
1	1982	Tourbillon			
–	1983	Not held			
–	1984	Not held			
2	1985	Tourbillon (2)			
3	1986	Tourbillon (3)			
4	1987	Tourbillon (4)			
5	1988	Anongo			
6	1989	Tourbillon (5)			
7	1990	Hatari			
8	1991	Hatari (2)			
9	1992	Tourbillon (6)			
10	1993	Vita Club			
11	1994	Vita Club (2)			
12	1995	Vita Club (3)			
13	1996	Vita Club (4)			
14	1997	Vita Club (5)			
–	1998	Not held			
15	1999-I	Vita Club (6)			
16	1999-II	Hatari (3)			
17	2000	Arc-en-ciel			
18	2001	Vita Club (7)			
19	2002	Arc-en-ciel (2)			
20	2003	Arc-en-ciel (3)			
21	2004	Arc-en-ciel (4)			
22	2005	Hatari (4)			
23	2006	Arc-en-ciel (5)			
24	2007	Radi de Lubumbashi			
25	2008	Radi de Lubumbashi (2)			
26	2009	Arc-en-ciel (6)			
27	2010	Arc-en-ciel (7)			
28	2011	Arc-en-ciel (8)	69–60	Radi de Lubumbashi	
29	2012	Arc-en-ciel (9)			
30	2013	CNSS			
31	2014	Radi de Lubumbashi (3)			
32	2015	Vita Club (8)			
33	2016	Vita Club (9)			
34	2017	Vita Club (10)	48–39	DCMP	
35	2018	Vita Club (11)			
36	2019	Makomeno	60–39	CNSS	
37	2020	Makomeno (2)	64–29	Tourbillon	
38	2021	CNSS (2)	64–61	V.Club	
39	2022	CNSS (3)	72–29	Makomeno	
40	2023	CNSS (4)	73-55	Chaux Sport	
41	2024	Makomeno City (3)	70–49	CNSS	
42	2025	CNSS (5)	77–55	Hatari	
