= Mohamed Tangara =

Malian-American basketball player

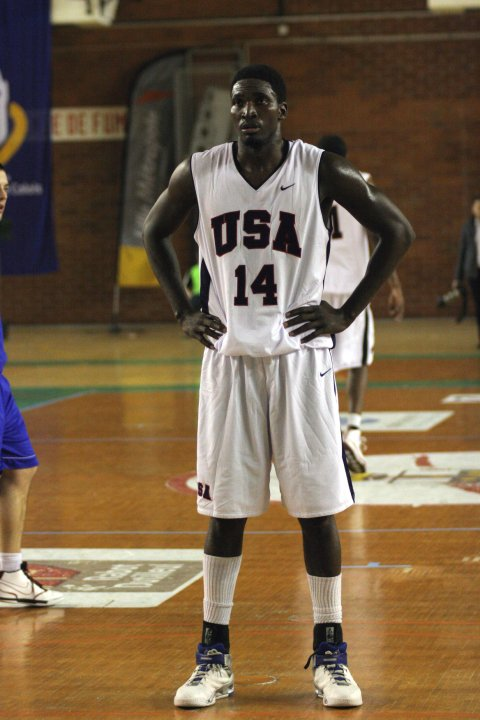

Personal information
- Born: August 11, 1984 (age 42) Nioro, Mali
- Listed height: 6 ft 10 in (2.08 m)
- Listed weight: 248 lb (112 kg)

Career information
- High school: Mount Zion Christian Academy (Durham, North Carolina)
- College: Arizona (2004–2008); Chaminade (2008–2009)
- NBA draft: 2009: undrafted
- Playing career: 2009–2015
- Position: Power forward / center

Career history
- 2009–2010: FUS Rabat
- 2010–2011: Estela Santander
- 2011: Al Jazeera
- 2011: Araberri
- 2011–2012: US Monastir
- 2012: Al Jaysh Army SC
- 2012: Primeiro de Agosto
- 2012–2013: Libolo
- 2014: Malabo Kings

Career highlights
- Liga EBA champion (2011); First-team All-Pac West (2009)

Mohamed Tangara (born August 11, 1984) is a Malian-American professional basketball player who last played for Libolo of the Angolan League. He played college basketball for the University of Arizona and Chaminade University.

== Early life ==
Born in Nioro, Mali to parents Hamidou and Sitan, Tangara grew up in the third-world surroundings of Bamako before eventually finding his way out thanks to basketball. One of ten siblings in a large African family, Tangara came to the United States in December 2000 where he enrolled at Mount Zion Christian Academy in Durham, North Carolina. There, he played basketball for the Warriors. As a junior in 2002–03, he averaged 18.0 points and 14.0 rebounds per game. During the summer of 2003, Tangara led Team Georgia Elite to the semi-finals of the AAU Super Showcase and was voted a top-five player at the NBA Camp, where he earned best defensive player honors.

On November 16, 2003, Tangara signed a National Letter of Intent to play college basketball for the University of Arizona.

As a senior in 2003–04, Tangara averaged 13.0 points, 15.0 rebounds and 4.0 blocks per game.

== College career ==
After a promising high school career, Tangara joined the Arizona Wildcats for the 2004–05 season. During preseason, however, he injured his back which subsequently hindered his play during the first five games of the season. He was later ruled out for the rest of the season and applied for a medical hardship waiver, which allowed him to retain four years of college eligibility.

Tangara returned to the Wildcats' line-up for the 2005–06 season as a redshirted freshman where he had a minor role in coach Lute Olson's rotation. In 21 games (no starts), he averaged 1.6 points and 1.0 rebounds per game.

In his final two seasons at Arizona, Tangara played just 18 games and scored four total points, leading him to part ways with the Wildcats following the 2007–08 season to seek a professional career overseas or to play a final year of college in Division II, where he would be eligible immediately. He later graduated from Arizona in May 2008 with a bachelor's degree in science.

In July 2008, Tangara transferred to Chaminade University where he went on to play for the Silverswords in the 25th annual EA Sports Maui Invitational. As a senior for Chaminade in 2008–09, Tangara averaged 14.4 points and 8.7 rebounds in 27 games as he earned first-team All-Pac West honors.

== Professional career ==
After going undrafted in the 2009 NBA draft, Tangara was invited by the Milwaukee Bucks to try out for their Summer League team but was ultimately not chosen for the final team. In December 2009, he signed with Fath US de Rabat of Morocco for the rest of the 2009–10 season.

In October 2010, Tangara signed with Estela Santander of Spain for the 2010–11 season. In January 2011, he left Estela and joined Al Jazeera of Libya before leaving them a month later due to unrest in the country. In April 2011, he returned to Spain and signed with Araberri for the rest of the 2010–11 season.

In December 2011, Tangara signed with US Monastir of Tunisia but left three months later when he joined Al Jaysh Army SC of Qatar in March 2012.

In September 2012, Tangara signed with Primeiro de Agosto of Angola but left two months later when he joined Libolo in November 2012 for the 2012 FIBA Africa Clubs Champions Cup.

On November 1, 2014, Tangara was selected by the Bakersfield Jam in the sixth round of the 2014 NBA Development League draft. He was later waived by the Jam on November 13, 2014.

== International career ==
Tangara first played for the Mali Under 18 national team in 2000 where he won bronze at the Under 18 Africa Cup, before joining the Mali senior team in 2007 where he competed in the All-Africa Games in Algeria. He went on to compete for Mali at the 2011 and 2013 FIBA Africa Championship.
