= BC Mazembe =

Mazembe
- League: Coupe du Congo
- Founded: 1958; 67 years ago
- History: BC Mazembe (1958–present)
- Location: Lubumbashi, DR Congo
- President: Papy Kamb
- Head coach: Simplice Tshibangu
- Website: www.bcmazembe.com
Home	Away

Basket Club Mazembe, sometimes known as ASB Mazembe, is a Congolese basketball club based in the city of Lubumbashi. Founded in 1958, the team is active on a domestic and pan-African level. They have won the Coupe du Congo, the highest national basketball competition, 10 times, trailing only CSTP for most titles.

The team has participated in the FIBA Africa Basketball League multiple times, with its best performances finishing fourth in 2009 and 2010.

== Honours ==
Cup of Congo

- Winners (10): 1993, 2008, 2009, 2010, 2011, 2013, 2014, 2017, 2019, 2020

FIBA Africa Basketball League

- Fourth place: 2009, 2010

== In African competitions ==
FIBA Africa Basketball League (7 appearances)

2009 – 4th Place (6–3)
2010 – 4th Place (3–4)
2011 – 5th Place (4–4)
2012 – 5th Place (1–4)
2014 – 7th Place (3–5)
2017 – Classification Round (2–5)
2018–19 – Group Stage (1–2)

== Players ==
=== Current roster ===
The following is the ASB Mazembe roster for the 2020 BAL Qualifying Tournaments:

Note: Flags indicate national team eligibility at FIBA-sanctioned events. Players may hold other non-FIBA nationalities not displayed.

ASB Mazembe roster
Players
Coaches

Pos.	No.	Nat.	Name
F	4	(Democratic Republic of the Congo)	Fula, Rolly
F	5	(Democratic Republic of the Congo)	Kapongo Kabuya, Djack
G	7	(Democratic Republic of the Congo)	Mwana Mwana, Arsène
F	8	(Democratic Republic of the Congo)	Makitu Sangwa, Placide
G	9	(Democratic Republic of the Congo)	N'Sasse, Alex
C	11	(Democratic Republic of the Congo)	Manga, Pitchou
F	12	(Democratic Republic of the Congo)	Isungu, Emmanuel
F	13	(Democratic Republic of the Congo)	Lueyeye, Freddy
PF	14	(Rwanda)	Kabange, Kami (I)

Head coach

- (Democratic Republic of the Congo) Simplice Tshibangu

Assistant coach(es)

- (Democratic Republic of the Congo) Thotho Tshimanga Kabangu

Legend

- (C) Team captain
- (I) Import player
- Injured

- Roster
Updated: 26 November 2019

=== Notable players ===
Note: Flags indicate national team eligibility at FIBA-sanctioned events. Players may hold other non-FIBA nationalities not displayed.

Criteria

To appear in this section a player must have either:

- Set a club record or won an individual award while at the club
- Played at least one official international match for their national team at any time
- Played at least one official NBA match at any time.

- Kami Kabange
- Rolly Fula Nganga
- Pitchou Kambuy Manga
