= Vladimir Gerónimo =

Angolan basketball player (born 1978)

Vladimir Ricardino
Personal information
- Born: October 4, 1978 (age 48) Benguela, Angola
- Listed height: 203 cm (6.66 ft)
- Listed weight: 93 kg (205 lb)

Career information
- Playing career: 2001–2018
- Position: Power forward / center

Career history
- 2001: Petro Atlético
- 2002, 2003: ASA
- 2005–2011: Primeiro de Agosto
- 2011–2013: Recreativo do Libolo
- 2013–2015: Petro Atlético
- 2016–2018: Primeiro de Agosto
Medals
Men's basketball
Representing Angola
AfroBasket
Gold medal – first place	Algiers 2005	National Team
African Games
Gold medal – first place	Algiers 2007	National Team
FIBA Africa Clubs Champions Cup
Gold medal – first place	Cairo 2004	1º de Agosto
Gold medal – first place	Luanda 2007	1º de Agosto
Gold medal – first place	Sousse 2008	1º de Agosto
Silver medal – second place	Lagos 2006	1º de Agosto
Bronze medal – third place	Abidjan 2005	1º de Agosto

Vladimir Ricardino Carval Jeronimo (born 4 October 1978), known as Vladimir Ricardino or Vladimir Jeronimo, is an Angolan basketball player and a former member of the Angola national basketball team. He stands 6 ft 4 in (1.93 m) tall and plays as a guard. He competed for Angola at the 2008 Summer Olympics.

He last played for Primeiro de Agosto at the Angolan major basketball league BAI Basket.
