= Basketball at the 2007 All-Africa Games – Men's team rosters =

This article displays the rosters for the participating teams at the 2007 All-Africa Games (men's basketball tournament).

== Algeria ==
Algeria national basketball team – 2007 All-Africa Games – 5th place roster
Players
Coaches

Pos.	No.	Name	Age – Date of birth	Height	Club	Ctr.
	4	Sofiane Boulaya	34 – 20 March 1973	1.80 m (5 ft 11 in)
	5	Hocine Gaham	21 – 1 May 1986
	6	Ali Benhocine	30 – 16 November 1976
	7	Hichem Ibrahim	27 – 11 August 1979
	8	Farid Belhimeur	23 – 8 May 1984	1.82 m (6 ft 0 in)
	9	Miloud Doubal	25 – 2 December 1981	1.87 m (6 ft 2 in)
	10	Farouk Djellali	28 – 18 December 1978
	11	Nadjim Ouali	36 – 28 February 1971	2.04 m (6 ft 8 in)
	12	Tarek Oukid	27 – 13 December 1979	2.05 m (6 ft 9 in)
	13	Amine Benramdane	34 – 27 April 1973	1.9 m (6 ft 3 in)
	14	Abdelhalim Sayah	31 – 23 August 1975	2.00 m (6 ft 7 in)
	15	Mohamed Zenboudji	26 – 1 September 1980

Head coach

Assistant coach

Legend

- (C) Team captain
- Club field describes current club

== Angola ==
Angola national basketball team – 2007 All-Africa Games – Gold Medal roster
Players
Coaches

Pos.	No.	Name	Age – Date of birth	Height	Club	Ctr.
SF	4	Gerson Monteiro	34 – 12 July 1973	1.90 m (6 ft 3 in)	Primeiro de Agosto	(Angola)
PG	5	Walter Costa (C)	34 – 25 March 1973	1.85 m (6 ft 1 in)	Primeiro de Agosto	(Angola)
	6	Nivaldo Sumbo	22 – 17 May 1981		Interclube	(Angola)
	7	Simão Panzo	26 – 29 January 1977		Interclube	(Angola)
PF	8	Leonel Paulo	17 – 30 April 1986	1.98 m (6 ft 6 in)	Petro Atlético	(Angola)
	9	Mayser Alexandre	19 – 29 June 1984		Primeiro de Agosto	(Angola)
PF	10	Vladimir Ricardino	24 – 4 October 1978	2.03 m (6 ft 8 in)	Primeiro de Agosto	(Angola)
C	11	Victor Muzadi	25 – 22 June 1978	2.01 m (6 ft 7 in)	Primeiro de Agosto	(Angola)
	12	Vicente Neto	27 – 8 August 1976		Interclube	(Angola)
	13	Fernando Albano	27 – 11 September 1975		Petro Atlético	(Angola)
PG	14	Domingos Bonifácio	18 – 28 October 1984	1.85 m (6 ft 1 in)	Petro Atlético	(Angola)
	15	Idelfonso Kiteculo	22 – 27 March 1981		Petro Atlético	(Angola)

Head coach

- (Angola) Jaime Covilhã

Assistant coach

- (Angola) Raúl Duarte

Legend

- (C) Team captain
- Club field describes current club

== Cameroon ==
Cameroon national basketball team – 2007 All-Africa Games – 8th place roster
Players
Coaches

Pos.	No.	Name	Age – Date of birth	Height	Club	Ctr.
	4	Christian Bayang	20 – 7 May 1987
	5	Joachim Ehawa	29 – 7 October 1977
	6	Gabriel Tchupou	18 – 28 November 1988
	7	Alexandre N'Kembe	28 – 1 April 1979
	8	Jean Pierre Ebongue	21 – 7 October 1985
	9	Modeste Peyemboua	22 – 2 July 1985
	10	Cyrille Tato	20 – 16 February 1987
	11	David Fondjo	18 – 3 December 1988
	12	Brice Nanfah	24 – 3 December 1982
	13	Joseph Owona	30 – 26 August 1976
	14	Alfred Baliaba	22 – 2 January 1985
	15	Georges Ebangue	20 – 11 March 1987

Head coach

Assistant coach

Legend

- (C) Team captain
- Club field describes current club

== DR Congo ==
DR Congo national basketball team – 2007 All-Africa Games – 9th place roster
Players
Coaches

Pos.	No.	Name	Age – Date of birth	Height	Club	Ctr.
	4	Yohan Lokanga	21 – 17 June 1986
	7	Alimasi Mali	22 – 3 November 1984
	8	Tatu Mbowa	27 – 6 April 1980
	9	Toto Mutombo	27 – 19 September 1979
	10	Docta Lukusa	26 – 2 July 1981
	11	Alain Musamba	20 – 3 March 1987
	12	Djo Loo Yele	25 – 11 June 1982
	14	Jim Kadima	29 – 17 August 1977
	15	Celo Selenge	32 – 8 December 1974

Head coach

Assistant coach

Legend

- (C) Team captain
- Club field describes current club

== Egypt ==
Egypt national basketball team – 2007 All-Africa Games – Silver Medal roster
Players
Coaches

Pos.	No.	Name	Age – Date of birth	Height	Club	Ctr.
	4	Mohamed Mahmoud	26 – 20 October 1980
	5	Mohamed El-Garhi	21 – 5 July 1986
	6	Ramy Gunady	25 – 20 December 1981	1.84 m (6 ft 0 in)
	7	Ahmed Hussein	23 – 22 February 1984
	8	Moamen El Einen	21 – 25 June 1986
	9	Ibrahim El-Gammal	19 – 23 March 1988
	10	Ismail Moneim	30 – 23 September 1976
	11	Haytham Sehrty	21 – 26 August 1985
	12	Wael El Sayed	28 – 1 December 1978
	13	Kareem Shamseia	24 – 16 March 1983
	14	Tarek El-Ghannam	28 – 6 October 1978
	15	Ashraf Rabie	24 – 16 January 1983

Head coach

Assistant coach

Legend

- (C) Team captain
- Club field describes current club

== Ivory Coast ==
Ivory Coast national basketball team – 2007 All-Africa Games – 6th place roster
Players
Coaches

Pos.	No.	Name	Age – Date of birth	Height	Club	Ctr.
	4	Serge Aboua	27 – 1 January 1976
	5	Angaman Koffi	18 – 18 May 1985
	6	Zokou Kounkorgo	18 – 13 January 1985
	7	Tramane Zerek	19 – 27 January 1984
	8	Didier Tape	21 – 25 October 1981
	9	Wahotien Coulibaly	19 – 11 November 1983
	10	Ismaël N'Diaye	21 – 20 April 1982
	11	Jean-François Grebe	20 – 27 February 1983
	12	Jean-Emmanuel Lebrun	29 – 31 July 1974
	13	Mamadou Diallo	21 – 17 November 1981
	14	Alfred Djahue	23 – 9 June 1980
	15	Stéphane Konaté	22 – 23 August 1980

Head coach

Assistant coach

Legend

- (C) Team captain
- Club field describes current club

== Liberia ==
Liberia national basketball team – 2007 All-Africa Games – 11th place roster
Players
Coaches

Pos.	No.	Name	Age – Date of birth	Height	Club	Ctr.
	4	Joseph Lackay	15 – 14 August 1988
	5	Raphael Quaye	28 – 6 April 1975
	6	Alphonso Kuiah	17 – 24 February 1986
	7	Samuel Davidson	17 – 7 September 1985
	8	Alvin Tapeh	31 – 18 April 1972
	9	Varney Tulay	15 – 1 April 1988
	10	Marcus Wolo	17 – 15 October 1985
	11	Samuel Gataweh	18 – 13 August 1985
	12	Mark Smith	15 – 19 December 1987
	13	John Bing	13 – 29 June 1990
	14	Samuel Ndoum	21 – 4 September 1981
	15	Jethro Bing	19 – 4 February 1984

Head coach

Assistant coach

Legend

- (C) Team captain
- Club field describes current club

== Mali ==
Mali national basketball team – 2007 All-Africa Games – 4th place roster
Players
Coaches

Pos.	No.	Name	Age – Date of birth	Height	Club	Ctr.
	4	Modibo Niakate	22 – 26 March 1981
	5	Namory Diarra	22 – 22 March 1981
	6	Sory Diakite	31 – 6 February 1972
	7	Mahamadou Drame	16 – 24 November 1986
	8	Aly Sanogo	15 – 3 October 1987
	9	Bougari Konate	18 – 24 April 1985
	10	Moussa Kone	19 – 14 July 1984
	11	Ba Diallo	16 – 29 August 1986
	12	Paul Dakouo	17 – 26 September 1985
	13	Tahirou Sani	17 – 2 November 1985
	14	Mohamed Tangara	19 – 11 August 1984
	15	Modibo Diarra	22 – 16 September 1980

Head coach

Assistant coach

Legend

- (C) Team captain
- Club field describes current club

== Nigeria ==
Nigeria national basketball team – 2007 All-Africa Games – Bronze Medal roster
Players
Coaches

Pos.	No.	Name	Age – Date of birth	Height	Club	Ctr.
	4	Michael Umeh	18 – 18 September 1984	1.88 m (6 ft 2 in)
	5	Jayson Obazuaye	19 – 27 July 1984	1.88 m (6 ft 2 in)
	6	Chamberlain Oguchi	17 – 28 April 1986	1.98 m (6 ft 6 in)
	7	Abubakar Usman	17 – 5 July 1986	1.90 m (6 ft 3 in)
	8	Orseer Ikyaator	13 – 9 September 1989
	9	Abdulrahman Mohammed	26 – 27 June 1977
	10	Henry Uhegwu	20 – 23 November 1982
	11	Ejike Ugboaja	18 – 28 May 1985	2.03 m (6 ft 8 in)
C	12	Jeleel Akindele	20 – 2 April 1983	2.16 m (7 ft 1 in)
	13	Stanley Gumut	17 – 21 February 1986	1.98 m (6 ft 6 in)
	14	Abdullahi Kuso	19 – 17 February 1984
	15	Olumide Oyedeji	22 – 11 May 1981	2.06 m (6 ft 9 in)

Head coach

Assistant coach

Legend

- (C) Team captain
- Club field describes current club

== South Africa ==
South Africa national basketball team – 2007 All-Africa Games – 7th place roster
Players
Coaches

Pos.	No.	Name	Age – Date of birth	Height	Club	Ctr.
	4	Quintin Denyssen	22 – 27 August 1980	2.00 m (6 ft 7 in)
PG	5	Nhlanhla Dlamini	16 – 2 September 1986	1.73 m (5 ft 8 in)
	6	Nyakallo Nthuping	23 – 14 January 1980	1.95 m (6 ft 5 in)
	7	Patrick Engelbrecht	26 – 25 October 1976
	8	Kenneth Motaung	24 – 13 September 1978	1.93 m (6 ft 4 in)
	9	Thabang Kgwedi	25 – 15 April 1978	1.98 m (6 ft 6 in)
	10	Buthi Mndaweni	27 – 2 January 1976
	11	Tsakani Ngobeni	19 – 16 December 1983
	12	Lesego Molebatsi	21 – 11 July 1982
	13	Neo Mothiba	21 – 21 March 1982	2.00 m (6 ft 7 in)
	14	Vusumuzi Dlamini	28 – 16 June 1975
	15	Kegorapetse Letsebe	22 – 14 October 1980	1.98 m (6 ft 6 in)

Head coach

Assistant coach

Legend

- (C) Team captain
- Club field describes current club

== Tunisia ==
Tunisia national basketball team – 2007 All-Africa Games – 10th place roster
Players
Coaches

Pos.	No.	Name	Age – Date of birth	Height	Club	Ctr.
	4	Mohamed Ghyaza	16 – 15 November 1986	2.03 m (6 ft 8 in)
	5	Salah Mejri	17 – 15 June 1986	2.16 m (7 ft 1 in)
	6	Samy Ouellani	18 – 9 August 1985
	7	Mohamed Hassen	20 – 14 December 1982
	8	Mourad El Mabrouk	16 – 19 October 1986
	9	Mahmoud Toumi	18 – 17 July 1985
	10	Bechir Hdidane	18 – 18 August 1984
	11	Seifallah Turki	21 – 4 September 1981
	12	Mohamed Mouine	17 – 1 January 1986
	13	Walid Manai	23 – 13 June 1980
	14	Zied Jaafar	20 – 11 April 1983
	15	Mohamed Sediri	17 – 18 January 1986

Head coach

Assistant coach

Legend

- (C) Team captain
- Club field describes current club

== See also ==
- 2007 FIBA Africa Championship squads
