= Basketball at the 2007 All-Africa Games – Men's tournament =

Basketball at the 2007 All-Africa Games men's tournament
Tournament details
- Host country: Algeria
- Dates: July 12–22, 2007
- Teams: 10
- Venues: 2 (in 2 Algiers, Staouéli host cities)

Final positions
- Champions: Angola (3rd title)

Tournament statistics
- MVP: (Egypt) Ismail Ahmed
- Top scorer: (Nigeria) Oguchi 20.4
- Top rebounds: (Egypt) Ahmed 10.8
- Top assists: (Egypt) Ahmed 4.6
- PPG (Team): Egypt 80.3
- RPG (Team): DR Congo 43
- APG (Team): Egypt 16

Official website
- All Africa Games: Tournament for Men 2007

The 2007 edition of the men's basketball tournament of the African Games was the 9th, organized by FIBA Africa and played under the auspices of FIBA, the basketball sport governing body. The tournament was held from 12 to 22 July 2007 in Algiers, Algeria, contested by 11 national teams and won by Angola, who defeated Egypt 56–50 in the final to win their third title.

== Draw ==
Group A	Group B
Algeria; Egypt; Ivory Coast; South Africa; Tunisia	Angola; Cameroon; DR Congo; Liberia; Mali; Nigeria

== Preliminary round ==
Times given below are in UTC+1.

=== Group A ===
Qualified for the quarter-finals

Team	W	L	PF	PA	Diff	Pts.
Egypt	4	0	326	244	+82	8
Ivory Coast	3	1	252	253	-1	7
Algeria	2	2	252	260	-8	6
South Africa	1	3	265	283	-18	5
Tunisia	0	4	244	299	-55	4

12 July 2007
17:00

Boxscore

Egypt	86–64	Tunisia
Scoring by quarter: 40-17, 19-14, 16-17, 11-16
Pts: Ahmed 16; Rebs: Ahmed 11; Asts: Ahmed 7		Pts: Sediri 13; Rebs: Ouellani 4 Asts: three players 1

Algiers

19:00

Boxscore

South Africa	59–65	Algeria
Scoring by quarter: 19-19, 16-13, 12-17, 12-16
Pts: Ngobeni, Molebatsi 14; Rebs: Ngobeni 7 Asts: Mothiba 2		Pts: Zenboudji 13; Rebs: three players 5 Asts: Boulaya 6

Algiers

13 July 2007
17:00

Boxscore

Egypt	70–48	Ivory Coast
Scoring by quarter: 17-9, 13-15, 18-7, 22-17
Pts: Ahmed 16; Rebs: Ahmed 10; Asts: Ahmed 5		Pts: S.Konaté 17; Rebs: Zerek 5 Asts: three players 2

Algiers

19:00

Boxscore

Tunisia	49–62	Algeria
Scoring by quarter: 16-19, 15-19, 8-15, 10-9
Pts: El Mabrouk 15; Rebs: Manai 8 Asts: three players 1		Pts: Ibrahim 11; Rebs: Gaham 7 Asts: Benramdane 2

Algiers

14 July 2007
17:00

Boxscore

Tunisia	65–69	Ivory Coast
Scoring by quarter: 20-20, 23-11, 9-18, 13-20
Pts: El Mabrouk 13; Rebs: Manai 6 Asts: Sediri 3		Pts: Coulibaly, Tape 13; Rebs: Djahue, Kounkorgo 7 Asts: Coulibaly, Zerek 3

Algiers

19:00

Boxscore

South Africa	59–82	Egypt
Scoring by quarter: 20-15, 13-21, 15-23, 11-23
Pts: Molebatsi 18; Rebs: Mothiba 5 Asts: Engelbrecht 2		Pts: Ahmed, Hussein 17; Rebs: Ahmed 15; Asts: Shamseia 4

Algiers

16 July 2007
17:00

Boxscore

Ivory Coast	70–66	South Africa
Scoring by quarter: 19-11, 17-27, 16-11, 18-17
Pts: Tape 14; Rebs: Djahue 9 Asts: Zerek 4		Pts: Dlamini 15; Rebs: Molebatsi, Letsebe 7 Asts: three players 3

Algiers

19:00

Boxscore

Egypt	88–73	Algeria
Scoring by quarter: 24-15, 21-14, 21-21, 22-23
Pts: Gunady 28; Rebs: Ahmed 9 Asts: Ahmed 3		Pts: Gaham 21; Rebs: Gaham 8 Asts: Belhimeur 3

Algiers

17 July 2007
17:00

Boxscore

Tunisia	66–82	South Africa
Scoring by quarter: 18-15, 11-25, 16-24, 21-18
Pts: Jaafar 29; Rebs: Jaafar 4 Asts: Ouellani, El Mabrouk 4		Pts: Letsebe 27; Rebs: Letsebe, Mothiba 6 Asts: Engelbrecht 5

Algiers

19:00

Boxscore

Algeria	52–65	Ivory Coast
Scoring by quarter: 10-14, 22-9, 10-13, 10-29
Pts: Belhimeur 18; Rebs: Sayah 6 Asts: three players 2		Pts: S.Konaté 14; Rebs: Djahue 9 Asts: two players 2

Algiers

=== Group B ===
Qualified for the quarter-finals

Team	W	L	PF	PA	Diff	Pts.
Angola	5	0	366	301	+65	10
Nigeria	4	1	370	293	+77	9
Mali	3	2	353	337	+16	8
Cameroon	2	3	356	330	+26	7
DR Congo	1	4	308	364	-56	6
Liberia	0	5	300	428	-128	5

12 July 2007
15:00

Boxscore

Cameroon	75–50	Liberia
Scoring by quarter: 17-17, 16-13, 19-6, 23-14
Pts: Bayang 15; Rebs: Baliaba 8 Asts: Ehawa, Peyemboua 3		Pts: Kuiah 9 Rebs: Gataweh 6 Asts: Davidson 3

Staouéli

17:00

Boxscore

Mali	65–77	Nigeria
Scoring by quarter: 10-18, 20-19, 21-24, 14-16
Pts: Niakate 27; Rebs: Tangara 7 Asts: Drame 2		Pts: Oguchi 33; Rebs: Umeh, Oyedeji 8 Asts: Umeh, Mohammed 3

Staouéli

19:00

Boxscore

DR Congo	53–72	Angola
Scoring by quarter: 15-22, 18-16, 8-16, 12-18
Pts: Yele 12; Rebs: Yele 12; Asts: Mbowa 2		Pts: Walter 13; Rebs: Ricardino 12; Asts: three players 2

Staouéli

13 July 2007
15:00

Boxscore

Angola	91–63	Liberia
Scoring by quarter: 14-18, 29-10, 18-13, 30-22
Pts: Gerson, Ricardino 15; Rebs: Muzadi 10; Asts: Gerson, Bonifácio 5		Pts: Quaye 11; Rebs: Gataweh 8 Asts: Kuiah 3

Staouéli

17:00

Boxscore

Nigeria	75–49	DR Congo
Scoring by quarter: 23-15, 14-14, 22-8, 16-12
Pts: Kuso 14; Rebs: Oyedeji 18; Asts: Mohammed 5		Pts: Yele, Selengue 16; Rebs: Yele 12; Asts: Lokanga 3

Staouéli

19:00

Boxscore

Cameroon	69–71	Mali
Scoring by quarter: 26-17, 16-20, 18-14, 9-20
Pts: Baliaba 18; Rebs: Baliaba, Bayang 7 Asts: Ehawa, N'Kembe 3		Pts: Diakite, Niakate 12; Rebs: Sani 7 Asts: Diakite 3

Staouéli

14 July 2007
15:00

Boxscore

Liberia	64–87	Mali
Scoring by quarter: 25-27, 9-24, 10-18, 20-18
Pts: Kuiah 21; Rebs: Gataweh 7 Asts: Quaye 4		Pts: Niakate 23; Rebs: M.Diarra 7 Asts: N.Diarra 4

Staouéli

17:00

Boxscore

DR Congo	57–85	Cameroon
Scoring by quarter: 23-28, 8-21, 11-24, 15-12
Pts: Kadima 14; Rebs: Selengue 10; Asts: Lukusa, Mali 2		Pts: Baliaba 16; Rebs: Baliaba, Owona 8 Asts: N'Kembe 4

Staouéli

19:00

Boxscore

Angola	61–58	Nigeria
Scoring by quarter: 18-14, 13-16, 11-16, 19-12
Pts: Muzadi, Bonifácio 12; Rebs: Muzadi 10; Asts: five players 1		Pts: Oguchi 16; Rebs: three players 9 Asts: three players 2

Staouéli

16 July 2007
15:00

Boxscore

Nigeria	79–57	Liberia
Scoring by quarter: 18-9, 17-15, 27-12, 17-21
Pts: Oguchi 17; Rebs: Kuso 10; Asts: Gumut 6		Pts: Smith 21; Rebs: Quaye 9 Asts: four players 2

Staouéli

17:00

Boxscore

Cameroon	63–71	Angola
Scoring by quarter: 24-21, 15-20, 17-11, 7-19
Pts: Ehawa 13; Rebs: Nanfah 11; Asts: three players 2		Pts: F.Albano 17; Rebs: Gerson, Walter 7 Asts: Gerson 5

Staouéli

19:00

Boxscore

Mali	66–56	DR Congo
Scoring by quarter: 18-19, 16-12, 15-17, 17-8
Pts: Niakate, Dakouo 14; Rebs: Niakate, Diakite 6 Asts: M.Diarra 2		Pts: Selengue 20; Rebs: Selengue 8 Asts: three players 2

Staouéli

17 July 2007
15:00

Boxscore

Liberia	66–93	DR Congo
Scoring by quarter: 14-15, 15-31, 21-18, 16-29
Pts: Smith, Kuiah 11; Rebs: Gataweh 8 Asts: Quaye 4		Pts: Mutombo 31; Rebs: Kadima 14; Asts: Mbowa 5

Staouéli

17:00

Boxscore

Angola	71–64	Mali
Scoring by quarter: 24-16, 17-17, 13-23, 17-8
Pts: Mayzer 14; Rebs: Leonel 6 Asts: Leonel, Gerson 4		Pts: Niakate 14; Rebs: Sani 7 Asts: seven players 1

Staouéli

19:00

Boxscore

Nigeria	81–61	Cameroon
Scoring by quarter: 26-18, 20-22, 19-11, 16-10
Pts: Oguchi 25; Rebs: Oyedeji, Ugboaja 10; Asts: Umeh 5		Pts: N'Kembe 12; Rebs: Bayang 4 Asts: N'Kembe 2

Staouéli

== Knockout stage ==
=== Championship bracket ===
Quarter-finals
19 July 2007 - 13:00
Cameroon	88
Egypt	89
19 July 2007 - 15:00
South Africa	68
Angola	80
19 July 2007 - 17:00
Mali	56
Ivory Coast	52
19 July 2007 - 19:00
Algeria	50
Nigeria	79

Semi-finals
20 July 2007 - 17:00
Egypt	67
Nigeria	55
20 July 2007 - 19:00
Angola	74
Mali	60

Final
22 July 2007 - 20:00
Egypt	50
Angola	56
Third place
22 July 2007 - 16:00
Nigeria	84
Mali	67

=== Quarterfinals ===
19 July 2007
13:00

Boxscore

Cameroon	88–89	Egypt
Scoring by quarter: 19-20, 24-24, 19-27, 26-18
Pts: Bayang 32; Rebs: Nanfah, Owona 6 Asts: Ehawa 3		Pts: Ahmed 26; Rebs: Ahmed, El-Ghannam 8 Asts: Ahmed, El Sayed 6

Algiers

15:00

Boxscore

South Africa	68–80	Angola
Scoring by quarter: 22-28, 20-14, 18-14, 8-24
Pts: Mndaweni 14; Rebs: Letsebe 8 Asts: Letsebe, Mothiba 2		Pts: Bonifácio 20; Rebs: Muzadi 6 Asts: Bonifácio 5

Algiers

17:00

Boxscore

Mali	56–52	Ivory Coast
Scoring by quarter: 14-16, 6-13, 15-12, 21-11
Pts: Diakite 11; Rebs: Sani 7 Asts: Niakate 4		Pts: Tape 11; Rebs: Tape 6 Asts: Coulibaly 3

Algiers

19:00

Boxscore

Algeria	50–79	Nigeria
Scoring by quarter: 10-14, 16-28, 11-17, 13-20
Pts: Doubal, Benramdane 8 Rebs: Doubal, Oukid 4 Asts: Boulaya, Belhimeur 2		Pts: Oguchi 29; Rebs: Ugboaja 15; Asts: Mohammed 3

Algiers

=== Semifinals ===
20 July 2007
17:00

Boxscore

Egypt	67–55	Nigeria
Scoring by quarter: 19-18, 16-12, 25-13, 7-12
Pts: Ahmed 22; Rebs: Ahmed 12; Asts: Ahmed 5		Pts: Umeh 24; Rebs: Ugboaja 15; Asts: three players 1

Algiers

19:00

Boxscore

Angola	74–60	Mali
Scoring by quarter: 22-22, 20-14, 20-11, 12-13
Pts: Mayzer, Bonifácio 16; Rebs: Gerson 8 Asts: Gerson 3		Pts: Niakate 15; Rebs: Dakouo 11; Asts: Niakate 3

Algiers

=== Bronze medal match ===
22 July 2007
16:00

Boxscore

Nigeria	84–67	Mali
Scoring by quarter: 22-14, 15-11, 27-14, 20-28
Pts: Oguchi 21; Rebs: Ugboaja 12; Asts: four players 3		Pts: Niakate 20; Rebs: Niakate 5 Asts: three players 2

Algiers

=== Final ===
22 July 2007
18:30

Boxscore

Egypt	50–56	Angola
Scoring by quarter: 16-12, 8-15, 12-19, 14-10
Pts: Ahmed 16; Rebs: Ahmed 16; Asts: Ahmed 6		Pts: Mayzer 15; Rebs: F.Albano 9 Asts: Walter 3

Algiers

=== 5–8th place bracket ===
Semi-finals
20 July 2007 - 09:00
Cameroon	68
Algeria	82
20 July 2007 - 11:00
South Africa	56
Ivory Coast	81

5th place
22 July 2007 - 11:00
Algeria	67
Ivory Coast	61
7th place
22 July 2007 - 09:00
Cameroon	77
South Africa	85

=== 5–8th place classification ===
20 July 2007
09:00

Boxscore

Cameroon	68–82	Algeria
Scoring by quarter: 16-27, 13-22, 20-14, 19-19
Pts: Ebangue 18; Rebs: Ebangue 11; Asts: Peyemboua 3		Pts: Oukid 26; Rebs: Sayah 11; Asts: Boulaya 6

Staouéli

11:00

Boxscore

South Africa	56–81	Ivory Coast
Scoring by quarter: 10-19, 14-20, 12-20, 20-22
Pts: Letsebe 18; Rebs: Kgwedi 7 Asts: Engelbrecht 5		Pts: S.Konaté 16; Rebs: S.Konaté 11; Asts: Zerek 5

Staouéli

=== 7th place match ===
22 July 2007
09:00

Boxscore

Cameroon	77–85	South Africa
Scoring by quarter: 21-19, 16-27, 24-20, 16-19
Pts: Ebangue 23; Rebs: Ebangue 10; Asts: Ehawa 3		Pts: Mothiba 23; Rebs: Mothiba 9 Asts: Letsebe, Engelbrecht 4

Staouéli

=== 5th place match ===
22 July 2007
11:00

Boxscore

Algeria	67–61	Ivory Coast
Scoring by quarter: 21-15, 19-11, 19-20, 8-15
Pts: Oukid 19; Rebs: Sayah 10; Asts: four players 3		Pts: Coulibaly 14; Rebs: Coulibaly, S.Konaté 7 Asts: S.Konaté 4

Staouéli

=== 9th place match ===
19 July 2007
11:00

Boxscore

Tunisia	58–73	DR Congo
Scoring by quarter: 13-25, 9-10, 20-22, 16-16
Pts: Jaafar 13; Rebs: Ouellani 8 Asts: Ouellani 5		Pts: Selengue 22; Rebs: Selengue 13; Asts: Lokanga 4

Staouéli

== Final standings ==
Rank	Team	Record
1st place, gold medalist(s)	Angola	8–0
2nd place, silver medalist(s)	Egypt	6–1
3rd place, bronze medalist(s)	Nigeria	6–2
4	Mali	4–4
5	Algeria	4–3
6	Ivory Coast	4–3
7	South Africa	2–5
8	Cameroon	2–6
9	DR Congo	2–4
10	Tunisia	0–5
11	Liberia	0–5

1st	2nd	3rd
Angola Domingos Bonifácio; Fernando Albano; Gerson Monteiro; Idelfonso Kiteculo; Leonel Paulo; Mayzer Alexandre; Nivaldo Sumbo; Simão Panzo; Vicente Neto; Victor Muzadi; Vladimir Ricardino; Walter Costa; Coach: Jaime Covilhã	Egypt Ahmed Hussein; Ashraf Rabie; Haytham Sehrty; Ibrahim El-Gammal; Ismail Ahmed; Kareem Shamseia; Moamen El Einen; Mohamed El-Garhi; Mohamed Mahmoud; Ramy Gunady; Tarek El-Ghannam; Wael El Sayed; Coach:	Nigeria Abdullahi Kuso; Abdulrahman Mohammed; Abubakar Usman; Chamberlain Oguchi; Ejike Ugboaja; Henry Uhegwu; Jayson Obazuaye; Jeleel Akindele; Michael Umeh; Olumide Oyedeji; Orseer Ikyaator; Stanley Gumut; Coach:

== Awards ==
2007 All-Africa Games Men's Basketball winner

Angola
Third title

Most Valuable Player
(Egypt) Ismail Ahmed

=== All-Tournament Team ===
- (Angola) Mayzer Alexandre
- (Mali) Modibo Niakate
- (Nigeria) Chamberlain Oguchi
- (Egypt) Ismail Ahmed
- (Egypt) Tarek El-Ghannam

== Statistical leaders ==
=== Individual Tournament Highs ===
Points per Game

Rank	Name	G	Pts	PPG
1	(Nigeria) Chamberlain Oguchi	7	143	20.4
2	(Egypt) Ismail Ahmed	6	115	19.1
3	(Mali) Modibo Niakate	7	120	17.1
4	(Democratic Republic of the Congo) Celo Selenge	6	92	15.3
5	(Tunisia) Zied Jaafar	5	68	13.6
6	(South Africa) Neo Mothiba	7	91	13
7	(South Africa) Kegorapetse Letsebe	7	87	12.4
8	(Cameroon) Christian Bayang	8	96	12
9	(Cameroon) Alfred Baliaba	6	71	11.8
10				

Rebounds

Rank	Name	G	Rbs	RPG
1	(Egypt) Ismail Ahmed	6	65	10.8
2	(Nigeria) Ejike Ugboaja	7	71	10.1
3	(Democratic Republic of the Congo) Celo Selenge	6	56	9.3
4	(Democratic Republic of the Congo) Jim Kadima	6	52	8.6
5	(Nigeria) Olumide Oyedeji	7	60	8.5
6	(Egypt) Tarek El-Ghannam	6	55	7.8
7	(Nigeria) Abdullahi Kuso	7	53	7.5
8	(Democratic Republic of the Congo) Djo Loo Yele	4	30	7.5
9	(Ivory Coast) Stéphane Konaté	7	42	6
10	(South Africa) Neo Mothiba	7	40	5.7

Assists

Rank	Name	G	Ast	APG
1	(Egypt) Ismail Ahmed	6	28	4.6
2	(South Africa) Patrick Engelbrecht	7	20	2.8
3	(Liberia) Raphael Quaye	5	14	2.8
4	(Angola) Gerson Monteiro	8	21	2.6
5	(Egypt) Wael El Sayed	6	15	2.5
6	(Algeria) Sofiane Boulaya	7	17	2.4
6	(Nigeria) Michael Umeh	7	17	2.4
6	(Ivory Coast) Tramane Zerek	7	17	2.4
9	(Tunisia) Samy Ouellani	5	11	2.2
10	(Cameroon) Joachim Ehawa	8	17	2.1

2-point field goal percentage

Rank	Name	G	A	M	2P%
1	(Egypt) Ismail Ahmed	6	46	30	65.2
2	(Ivory Coast) Stéphane Konaté	7	46	30	65.2
3	(Democratic Republic of the Congo) Djo Loo Yele	4	24	15	62.5
4	(Cameroon) Alfred Baliaba	6	43	24	55.8
5	(Nigeria) Abdullahi Kuso	7	43	24	55.8
6	(Democratic Republic of the Congo) Jim Kadima	6	36	20	55.5
7	(Cameroon) Brice Nanfah	7	53	29	54.7
8	(Algeria) Tarek Oukid	6	39	21	53.8
9	(Cameroon) Georges Ebangue	6	40	21	52.5
10	(Angola) Vladimir Ricardino	8	52	26	50

3-point field goal percentage

Rank	Name	G	A	M	3P%
1	(South Africa) Lesego Molebatsi	7	25	14	56
2	(Cameroon) Jean Pierre Ebongue	7	17	8	47
3	(Algeria) Ali Benhocine	5	16	7	43.7
4	(Mali) Modibo Niakate	7	39	17	43.5
5	(Egypt) Ahmed Hussein	6	23	10	43.4
6	(Egypt) Ramy Gunady	6	30	13	43.3
7	(Tunisia) Zied Jaafar	5	30	12	40
8	(Ivory Coast) Angaman Koffi	7	15	6	40
9	(Angola) Fernando Albano	8	46	18	39.1
10	(Tunisia) Mourad El Mabrouk	5	18	7	38.8

Free throw percentage

Rank	Name	G	A	M	FT%
1	(South Africa) K. Letsebe	7	21	17	80.9
2	(Egypt) Ismail Ahmed	6	20	16	80
3	(Egypt) Wael El Sayed	6	24	19	79.1
4	(Liberia) Alphonso Kuiah	5	18	14	77.7
5	(Mali) Mohamed Tangara	7	25	19	76
6	(Nigeria) Chamberlain Oguchi	7	40	30	75
7	(Cameroon) Alfred Baliaba	6	27	20	74
8	(Democratic Republic of the Congo) Toto Mutombo	6	23	17	73.9
9	(Nigeria) Michael Umeh	7	21	15	71.4
10	(Mali) Modibo Niakate	7	41	29	70.7

=== Team Tournament Highs ===
Points per Game

Rank	Name	G	Pts	PPG
1	Egypt	6	482	80.3
2	Nigeria	7	513	73.2
3	Cameroon	8	586	73.2
4	Angola	8	576	72
5	South Africa	7	475	67.8
6	Mali	7	470	67.1
7	Algeria	7	451	64.4
8	Ivory Coast	7	446	63.7
9	DR Congo	6	381	63.5
10	Tunisia	5	302	60.4

Rebounds

Rank	Name	G	Rbs	RPG
1	Nigeria	7	342	48.8
2	DR Congo	6	258	43
3	Ivory Coast	7	285	40.7
4	Liberia	5	197	39.4
5	Cameroon	8	309	38.6
6	Egypt	6	228	38
7	Angola	8	296	37
8	Mali	7	250	35.7
9	Algeria	7	236	33.7
10	South Africa	7	231	33

Assists

Rank	Name	G	Ast	APG
1	Egypt	6	96	16
2	Angola	8	99	12.3
3	Ivory Coast	7	84	12
4	Nigeria	7	81	11.5
5	Algeria	7	77	11
6	DR Congo	6	65	10.8
7	Liberia	5	51	10.2
8	South Africa	7	70	10
9	Cameroon	8	72	9
10	Mali	7	57	8.14

2-point field goal percentage

Rank	Name	G	A	M	2P%
1	Egypt	6	211	128	60.6
2	South Africa	7	248	121	48.7
3	Angola	8	285	137	48
4	Nigeria	7	283	136	48
5	Ivory Coast	7	301	143	47.5
6	Cameroon	8	358	169	47.2
7	Algeria	7	231	108	46.7
8	Tunisia	8	177	82	46.3
9	DR Congo	6	265	117	44.1
10	Mali	7	256	113	44.1

3-point field goal percentage

Rank	Name	G	A	M	3P%
1	Nigeria	7	136	46	33.8
2	Egypt	6	141	47	33.3
3	South Africa	7	134	44	32.8
4	Cameroon	8	137	43	31.3
5	Angola	8	214	66	30.8
6	Mali	7	135	38	28.1
7	Algeria	7	177	48	27.1
8	Tunisia	5	89	24	26.9
9	Ivory Coast	7	137	32	23.3
10	Liberia	5	121	27	22.3

Free throw percentage

Rank	Name	G	A	M	FT%
1	Egypt	6	134	85	63.4
2	South Africa	7	160	101	63.1
3	Mali	7	215	130	60.4
4	Angola	8	174	104	59.7
5	Tunisia	5	112	66	58.9
6	Algeria	7	160	91	56.8
7	Nigeria	7	184	103	55.9
8	Cameroon	8	220	119	54
9	DR Congo	6	170	87	51.1
10	Ivory Coast	7	142	64	45

== See also ==
2007 FIBA Africa Championship
