= 2006 FIBA Africa Clubs Champions Cup squads =

This article displays the rosters for the participating teams at the 2006 FIBA Africa Club Championship.

== (Ivory Coast) Abidjan Basket Club ==
Abidjan Basket Club – 2006 FIBA Africa Clubs Champions Cup – 6th place roster
Players							Coaches
Pos	#	Nat	Name	Height	Weight	Age	Head Coach
	4	(Ivory Coast)	Abou Fofana			20 November 1986 (aged 20)
	5	(Ivory Coast)	N'Dri Kouakou			13 April 1985 (aged 21)
	6	(Ivory Coast)	Pierre Gbotto			18 August 1982 (aged 24)	Assistant coach(es)
	7	(Ivory Coast)	Jean Besse			16 January 1978 (aged 28)
	8	(Ivory Coast)	Saïba Kouyate			29 March 1986 (aged 20)
	9	(Ivory Coast)	Eric Affi			1 January 1982 (aged 24)
	10	(Ivory Coast)	Asshe Kokoun			28 December 1985 (aged 20)
	11	(Ivory Coast)	Aka Diamah			10 September 1984 (aged 22)
	12	(Ivory Coast)	Aristide Yao			14 May 1980 (aged 26)
	13	(Ivory Coast)	Blaise Amalabian			3 February 1974 (aged 32)
	14	(Ivory Coast)	Guy Touali			29 April 1974 (aged 32)
	15	(Ivory Coast)	Stéphane Konaté	1.93 m (6 ft 4 in)	80 kg (180 lb)	23 August 1980 (aged 26)

== (Ivory Coast) Africa Sports ==
Africa Sports – 2006 FIBA Africa Clubs Champions Cup – 9th place roster
Players							Coaches
Pos	#	Nat	Name	Height	Weight	Age	Head Coach
	4	(Ivory Coast)	Ibne Esmel			26 May 1983 (aged 23)
	5	(Ivory Coast)	Ange Tiene			1 January 1985 (aged 21)
	6	(Ivory Coast)	Seydou Traoré			5 September 1984 (aged 22)	Assistant coach(es)
	7	(Ivory Coast)	Hugues Moro			30 March 1984 (aged 22)
G	8	(Nigeria)	Adesola Alayande	1.83 m (6 ft 0 in)		25 May 1984 (aged 22)
	9	(Ivory Coast)	Stéphane Behinan			29 April 1979 (aged 27)
	10	(Ivory Coast)	Amara Kamate			14 September 1981 (aged 25)
	11	(Ivory Coast)	Daingui Kraidy			24 March 1978 (aged 28)
	12	(Ivory Coast)	Gaston Mokeme			10 September 1976 (aged 30)
	13	(Ivory Coast)	Charles Soumah			2 September 1978 (aged 28)
	14	(Ivory Coast)	Alpha Ouattara			26 March 1981 (aged 25)
	15	(Ivory Coast)	Bi Gohi			9 February 1979 (aged 27)

== (Guinea) BACK ==
BACK – 2006 FIBA Africa Clubs Champions Cup – 11th place roster
Players							Coaches
Pos	#	Nat	Name	Height	Weight	Age	Head Coach
	4	(Guinea)	Moustapha Condé			1 November 1987 (aged 19)
	5	(Guinea)	Ousmane Sylla			22 November 1983 (aged 23)
	6	(Guinea)	Mamady Soumaoro			7 October 1983 (aged 23)	Assistant coach(es)
	7	(Guinea)	Djibril Savane			10 November 1982 (aged 24)
	8	(Guinea)	Sékou Condé			31 December 1986 (aged 19)
	9	(Guinea)	Kalagban Conde			22 December 1983 (aged 22)
	10	(Guinea)	Amara Keita			1 January 1987 (aged 19)
	11	(Guinea)	N'Famara Soumah			17 November 1984 (aged 22)
	12	(Guinea)	Mohamed Tolno			10 April 1977 (aged 29)
	13	(Guinea)	N'Faly Camara			10 July 1986 (aged 20)
	14	(Guinea)	Bangaly Sangaré			12 October 1988 (aged 18)
	15	(Guinea)	Beka Mohamed			17 September 1987 (aged 19)

== (Nigeria) Dodan Warriors ==
Dodan Warriors – 2006 FIBA Africa Clubs Champions Cup – Bronze medal roster
Players							Coaches
Pos	#	Nat	Name	Height	Weight	Age	Head Coach
	4	(Nigeria)	Ahmed Ayodele			18 July 1989 (aged 17)
	5	(Nigeria)	Alexander Anyebe Ujoh			9 April 1986 (aged 20)
	6	(Nigeria)	Ibrahim Yusuf			4 May 1989 (aged 17)	Assistant coach(es)
	7	(Nigeria)	Daniel Daudu			22 October 1989 (aged 17)
	8	(Nigeria)	Bukar Muhammed			20 June 1990 (aged 16)
	9	(Nigeria)	Anthony Ocholi			13 March 1985 (aged 21)
	10	(Nigeria)	Harry Ezenibe			5 November 1987 (aged 19)
	11	(Nigeria)	Michael Uma-Okoro			6 November 1989 (aged 17)
	12	(Nigeria)	Temidayo Adebayo			4 October 1988 (aged 18)
	13	(Nigeria)	Alexander Friday Ujoh			24 April 1987 (aged 19)
	14	(Nigeria)	Mbaram Omori			10 August 1988 (aged 18)
	15	(Nigeria)	Chukwuma Okwandu			24 October 1986 (aged 20)

== (South Africa) ESPN / AND 1 ==
ESPN / AND 1 – 2006 FIBA Africa Clubs Champions Cup – 5th place roster
Players							Coaches
Pos	#	Nat	Name	Height	Weight	Age	Head Coach
	4	(South Africa)	Quintin Denyssen			27 August 1980 (aged 26)
	5	(South Africa)	Teddy Itoua			29 April 1979 (aged 27)
	6	(South Africa)	Efthinios Karamitsos			1 October 1980 (aged 26)	Assistant coach(es)
	7	(South Africa)	Neo Mothiba			21 March 1982 (aged 24)
	8	(South Africa)	Djo Yele			11 June 1982 (aged 24)
	9	(South Africa)	Craig Gilchrist			16 April 1970 (aged 36)
	10	(South Africa)	Buthi Mndaweni			2 January 1976 (aged 30)
	11	(South Africa)	Dinesh Mitchell			22 January 1980 (aged 26)
	12	(South Africa)	Lesego Molebatsi			11 July 1982 (aged 24)
	13	(South Africa)	Thuso Moiloa			12 September 1978 (aged 28)
	14	(South Africa)	Vusumuzi Dlamini			16 June 1975 (aged 31)
	15	(South Africa)	Kegorapetse Letsebe			14 October 1980 (aged 26)

== (Republic of the Congo) Inter Club Brazzaville ==
Inter Club Brazzaville – 2006 FIBA Africa Clubs Champions Cup – 4th place roster
Players							Coaches
Pos	#	Nat	Name	Height	Weight	Age	Head Coach
	4	(Republic of the Congo)	Christ Mossaye			20 February 1985 (aged 21)
	5	(Republic of the Congo)	Bruno Nguia			21 March 1978 (aged 28)
	6	(Republic of the Congo)	Christian Boungou			20 August 1981 (aged 25)	Assistant coach(es)
	7	(Democratic Republic of the Congo)	Léonard Katanshi			29 June 1976 (aged 30)
	8	(Central African Republic)	Romaric Kondzy			12 December 1980 (aged 25)
	9	(Republic of the Congo)	Herman Essandzabeka			16 December 1986 (aged 19)
	10	(Republic of the Congo)	Ghislain Elenga			30 November 1979 (aged 26)
	11	(Republic of the Congo)	Max Kouguere			12 March 1987 (aged 19)
	12	(Republic of the Congo)	Yul Okho			21 April 1974 (aged 32)
	13	(Republic of the Congo)	Serge Ibaka	2.08 m (6 ft 10 in)		18 September 1989 (aged 17)
	14	(Democratic Republic of the Congo)	Jim Kadima			17 August 1977 (aged 29)
	15	(Republic of the Congo)	Jesus Ampele			7 May 1978 (aged 28)

== (Kenya) KCB Lions ==
KCB Lions – 2006 FIBA Africa Clubs Champions Cup – 12th place roster
Players							Coaches
Pos	#	Nat	Name	Height	Weight	Age	Head Coach
	4	(Kenya)	Paul Awuor			20 August 1980 (aged 26)
	5	(Kenya)	John Maina			12 December 1975 (aged 30)
	6	(Kenya)	Bernard Ringui			30 March 1973 (aged 33)	Assistant coach(es)
	7	(Kenya)	Robert Juma			21 January 1971 (aged 35)
	8	(Kenya)	Gregory Odera			9 July 1973 (aged 33)
	9	(Kenya)	David Otiso			20 March 1982 (aged 24)
	10	(Kenya)	Wycliffe Odhiambo			7 August 1980 (aged 26)
	11	(Kenya)	Patrick Kirui			24 November 1981 (aged 25)
	12	(Kenya)	Tobias Nyindha			10 July 1980 (aged 26)
	13	(Kenya)	Joel Weramondi			16 January 1973 (aged 33)
	14	(Kenya)	Arthur Adala			7 November 1970 (aged 36)
	15	(Kenya)	Paul Oloo			31 August 1978 (aged 28)

== (Democratic Republic of the Congo) B.C. Onatra ==
BC Onatra – 2006 FIBA Africa Clubs Champions Cup – 10th place roster
Players							Coaches
Pos	#	Nat	Name	Height	Weight	Age	Head Coach
	4	(Democratic Republic of the Congo)	Kanyinda Tshiabola			6 September 1985 (aged 21)
	5	(Democratic Republic of the Congo)	Christian Moenge			22 June 1989 (aged 17)
	6	(Democratic Republic of the Congo)	Mulamba-Mulamba			6 June 1988 (aged 18)	Assistant coach(es)
	7	(Democratic Republic of the Congo)	Kabangu-Tshimbanga			18 September 1983 (aged 23)
	8	(Democratic Republic of the Congo)	Tatu Mbowa			6 April 1980 (aged 26)
	9	(Democratic Republic of the Congo)	Presta Nzuzi			2 October 1980 (aged 26)
	10	(Democratic Republic of the Congo)	Docta Lukusa			2 July 1981 (aged 25)
	11	(Democratic Republic of the Congo)	Bebina Mutombo			30 August 1977 (aged 29)
	12	(Democratic Republic of the Congo)	Bienvenu Ngandu			28 August 1985 (aged 21)
	13	(Democratic Republic of the Congo)	Mabilama Samuna			12 June 1978 (aged 28)
	14	(Democratic Republic of the Congo)	Isasi Ndelo			18 November 1986 (aged 20)
	15	(Democratic Republic of the Congo)	Erick Mukangala			3 June 1988 (aged 18)

== (Angola) Petro Atlético ==
Petro Atlético – 2006 FIBA Africa Clubs Champions Cup – Gold medal roster
Players							Coaches
Pos	#	Nat	Name	Height	Weight	Age	Head Coach
PF	4	(Angola)	Eduardo Mingas	1.98 m (6 ft 6 in)	106 kg (234 lb)	29 January 1979 (aged 27)	(Angola) Alberto de Carvalho
F	5	(Angola)	Luís Costa	1.94 m (6 ft 4 1/2 in)	93 kg (205 lb)	7 June 1978 (aged 28)
SG	6	(Angola)	Carlos Morais	1.93 m (6 ft 4 in)	91 kg (201 lb)	16 October 1985 (aged 21)	Assistant coach(es)
	7	(Angola)	Fernando Albano			11 September 1975 (aged 31)
PF	8	(Angola)	Leonel Paulo	1.97 m (6 ft 5 1/2 in)	114 kg (251 lb)	30 April 1986 (aged 20)
	9	(United States)	Frederick Gentry			7 July 1977 (aged 29)
	10	(United States)	Shannon Crooks			11 December 1978 (aged 27)
PF	11	(Angola)	Jorge Tati	1.95 m (6 ft 5 in)	91 kg (201 lb)	17 June 1983 (aged 23)
G	12	(Angola)	Domingos Bonifácio	1.84 m (6 ft 1/2 in)	76 kg (168 lb)	28 October 1984 (aged 22)
G	13	(Angola)	Mílton Barros	1.83 m (6 ft 0 in)	75 kg (165 lb)	21 June 1984 (aged 22)
	14	(Angola)	Feliciano Camacho			24 December 1981 (aged 24)
F	15	(Angola)	Víctor de Carvalho	1.93 m (6 ft 4 in)	89 kg (196 lb)	20 February 1969 (aged 37)

== (Nigeria) Plateau Peaks ==
Plateau Peaks – 2006 FIBA Africa Clubs Champions Cup – 7th place roster
Players							Coaches
Pos	#	Nat	Name	Height	Weight	Age	Head Coach
	4	(Nigeria)	Japhet Dimka			1 February 1975 (aged 31)
	5	(Nigeria)	Nanfwang Lohor			15 July 1986 (aged 20)
	6	(Nigeria)	Samuel Negedu			26 October 1976 (aged 30)	Assistant coach(es)
	7	(Nigeria)	Ice Ngusha			16 February 1989 (aged 17)
	8	(Nigeria)	Hilshap Zammeh			26 June 1982 (aged 24)
	9	(Nigeria)	Kevin Ninmol			9 November 1985 (aged 21)
	10	(Nigeria)	Femi Emmanuel			4 April 1987 (aged 19)
	11	(Nigeria)	Chiedozie Nwoye			21 May 1982 (aged 24)
	12	(Nigeria)	Samaila Ibrahim			2 November 1988 (aged 18)
G	13	(Nigeria)	Stanley Gumut	1.98 m (6 ft 6 in)		21 February 1986 (aged 20)
	14	(Nigeria)	Abubakar Usman	1.90 m (6 ft 3 in)		5 July 1986 (aged 20)
	15	(Nigeria)	Oche Omaga			2 June 1982 (aged 24)

== (Angola) Primeiro de Agosto ==
Primeiro de Agosto – 2006 FIBA Africa Clubs Champions Cup – Silver medal roster
Players							Coaches
Pos	#	Nat	Name	Height	Weight	Age	Head Coach
G	4	(Angola)	Mayzer Alexandre	1.84 m (6 ft 1/2 in)		29 June 1984 (aged 22)	(Angola) Jaime Covilhã
SF	5	(Angola)	Carlos Almeida	1.93 m (6 ft 4 in)	91 kg (201 lb)	24 September 1976 (aged 30)
PG	6	(Angola)	Armando Costa	1.92 m (6 ft 3 1/2 in)	91 kg (201 lb)	3 June 1983 (aged 23)
F	7	(Angola)	Olímpio Cipriano	1.94 m (6 ft 4 1/2 in)	93 kg (205 lb)	9 April 1982 (aged 24)
C	8	(Angola)	Joaquim Gomes	2.00 m (6 ft 6 1/2 in)	100 kg (220 lb)	23 December 1980 (aged 25)
PF	9	(Angola)	Ângelo Victoriano	1.96 m (6 ft 5 in)	112 kg (247 lb)	8 February 1968 (aged 38)
PF	10	(Angola)	Vladimir Ricardino	2.03 m (6 ft 8 in)	93 kg (205 lb)	4 October 1978 (aged 28)
C	11	(Angola)	Victor Muzadi	2.01 m (6 ft 7 in)	102 kg (225 lb)	22 June 1978 (aged 28)
C	12	(Angola) (Chad)	Abdel Bouckar	2.02 m (6 ft 7 1/2 in)	109 kg (240 lb)	8 April 1980 (aged 26)
PG	13	(Angola)	Walter Costa	1.85 m (6 ft 1 in)	82 kg (181 lb)	25 March 1973 (aged 33)
PG	14	(Angola)	Miguel Lutonda	1.86 m (6 ft 1 in)	78 kg (172 lb)	24 December 1971 (aged 34)
C	15	(Angola) (Democratic Republic of the Congo)	Buila Katiavala	2.06 m (6 ft 9 in)	102 kg (225 lb)	13 May 1976 (aged 30)

== (Ivory Coast) Zenith BC ==
Zenith – 2006 FIBA Africa Clubs Champions Cup – 8th place roster
Players							Coaches
Pos	#	Nat	Name	Height	Weight	Age	Head Coach
	4	(Ivory Coast)	Ibrahima Diakite			19 September 1984 (aged 22)
	5	(Ivory Coast)	Kouamé Kouadio			24 July 1986 (aged 20)
	6	(Ivory Coast)	Konvaly Kone			31 July 1985 (aged 21)	Assistant coach(es)
	7	(Ivory Coast)	Haouet Toh			31 December 1988 (aged 17)
	8	(Ivory Coast)	Constant Yanga			20 June 1975 (aged 31)
	9	(Ivory Coast)	Kacou Agbe			3 April 1979 (aged 27)
	10	(Ivory Coast)	Soumaïla Sissoko			31 December 1982 (aged 23)
	11	(Ivory Coast)	Toka Toure			24 September 1983 (aged 23)
	12	(Ivory Coast)	David Fondjo			3 December 1988 (aged 17)
	13	(Ivory Coast)	Karamoko Traore			25 June 1985 (aged 21)
	14	(Ivory Coast)	Ble Lagui			3 July 1981 (aged 25)
	15	(Ivory Coast)	Donissongui Kone			19 July 1984 (aged 22)
