= 2006 FIBA Africa Clubs Champions Cup qualifying rounds =

The qualifying rounds for the 2006 FIBA Africa Clubs Champions Cup were played in two groups, in Kinshasa and Abidjan, respectively, each group qualifying four teams for the final round, played in Lagos, Nigeria.

== Teams ==
=== Group A ===
	Group B	M	W	L	PF	PA	Diff	P
1.	(Angola) 1º de Agosto	6	6	0	402	349	+53	12
2.	(Angola) Petro Atlético	6	4	2	411	338	+73	10
3.	(Democratic Republic of the Congo) BC Onatra	6	3	3	302	348	-46	9
4.	(Republic of the Congo) Inter Club	6	3	3	348	322	+26	9
5.	(Democratic Republic of the Congo) ASB Kauka	4	0	4	345	368	-23	4

September 26, 2006
16:00

Report

Inter Club (Republic of the Congo)	52–91	(Angola) 1º de Agosto
Scoring by quarter: 11–23, 12–27, 11–21, 18–20
Pts: Ngombo 10; Rebs: Kondzy 4 Asts: Ampele, Kadima 4		Pts: Kikas 18; Rebs: Olímpio, Mayzer 3 Asts: Olímpio 9

September 23, 2006
18:00

Report

Petro Atlético (Angola)	87–70	(Democratic Republic of the Congo) BC Onatra
Scoring by quarter: 23–14, 13–14, 17–19, 34–23
Pts: Jordão 16; Rebs: Mingas 8 Asts: Mílton 3		Pts: Lukusa 19; Rebs: Mutombo 6 Asts: Mbowa 3

September 24, 2006
16:00

Report

ASB Kauka (Democratic Republic of the Congo)	68–72	(Democratic Republic of the Congo) BC Onatra
Scoring by quarter: 11–22, 20–14, 20–13, 17–23
Pts: Mali 18; Rebs: Musamba 10; Asts: Three players, 3		Pts: Lukusa 15; Rebs: Moenge 6 Asts: Kamona 4

September 24, 2006
18:00

Report

Inter Club (Republic of the Congo)	48–66	(Angola) Petro Atlético
Scoring by quarter: 17–16, 4–14, 11–16, 16–20
Pts: Kouguere 31; Rebs: Kondzy 9 Asts: 6 players, 1		Pts: C.Morais 21; Rebs: Mingas 9 Asts: Mílton 6

September 25, 2006
16:00

Report

ASB Kauka (Democratic Republic of the Congo)	60–77	(Republic of the Congo) Inter Club
Scoring by quarter: 18–12, 18–25, 12–23, 12–17
Pts: Mualaba 12; Rebs: Musamba 7 Asts: Kabeya 6		Pts: Kouguere 25; Rebs: Kadima 12; Asts: Kouguere 5

September 25, 2006
18:00

Report

1º de Agosto (Angola)	64–59	(Angola) Petro Atlético
Scoring by quarter: 29–22, 12–15, 14–16, 9–6
Pts: Olímpio 15; Rebs: Olímpio 10; Asts: A.Costa 5		Pts: C.Morais 21; Rebs: Mingas 10; Asts: Mílton 3

September 26, 2006
16:00

Report

BC Onatra (Democratic Republic of the Congo)	84–78	(Republic of the Congo) Inter Club
Scoring by quarter: 23–18, 25–21, 12–22, 24–17
Pts: Mbowa, Nzuzi 16; Rebs: Mbowa 7 Asts: Mbowa 5		Pts: Kouguere 20; Rebs: Kadima 8 Asts: Boungou 2

September 26, 2006
18:00

Report

1º de Agosto (Angola)	82–54	(Democratic Republic of the Congo) ASB Kauka
Scoring by quarter: 27–19, 13–18, 20–6, 22–11
Pts: Kikas 18; Rebs: Abdel 14; Asts: Abdel, A.Costa 4		Pts: Mualaba 14; Rebs: Three players, 6 Asts: Mualaba 4

September 27, 2006
16:00

Report

Petro Atlético (Angola)	87–52	(Democratic Republic of the Congo) ASB Kauka
Scoring by quarter: 24–18, 20–11, 25–11, 18–12
Pts: Jordão, E.Camacho 14; Rebs: Bonifácio 11; Asts: J.Tati 6		Pts: Musamba 15; Rebs: Musamba 7 Asts: Mohamed 5

September 27, 2006
18:00

Report

BC Onatra (Democratic Republic of the Congo)	56–76	(Republic of the Congo) 1º de Agosto
Scoring by quarter: 19–21, 9–17, 12–18, 16–20
Pts: Lukusa 21; Rebs: Lukusa, Ndelo 5 Asts: Samuna 2		Pts: Walter 15; Rebs: Kikas 8 Asts: Kikas 3

September 28, 2006
16:00

Report

1º de Agosto (Angola)	88–55	(Republic of the Congo) Inter Club
Scoring by quarter: 16–15, 27–12, 24–13, 21–15
Pts: Lutonda 19; Rebs: Kikas 5 Asts: A.Costa, C.Almeida 5		Pts: Boungou 18; Rebs: Boungou 10; Asts: 4 players, 3

September 28, 2006
18:00

Report

Petro Atlético (Angola)	76–54	(Democratic Republic of the Congo) BC Onatra
Scoring by quarter: 19–13, 19–11, 22–15, 16–15
Pts: Bonifácio, J.Tati 12; Rebs: Jordão 5 Asts: Mílton 6		Pts: Moenge 21; Rebs: Mbanzi 5 Asts: Samuna 5

September 29, 2006
16:00

Report

Inter Club (Democratic Republic of the Congo)	99–106 (OT)	(Republic of the Congo) BC Onatra
Scoring by quarter: 22–22, 19–10, 20–18, 16–27, Overtime: 7–14
Pts: Kouguere 24; Rebs: Boungou 11; Asts: Kouguere 3		Pts: Moenge 23; Rebs: Kamona 7 Asts: Samuna, Lukusa 5

September 29, 2006
18:00

Report

1º de Agosto (Angola)	73–69 (OT)	(Angola) Petro Atlético
Scoring by quarter: 16–12, 19–15, 13–15, 13–19, Overtime: 12–8
Pts: Kikas 23; Rebs: Kikas 8 Asts: A.Costa 3		Pts: C.Morais 16; Rebs: Mingas 10; Asts: Mílton, Mingas 6

=== Group B ===
	Group A	M	W	L	PF	PA	Diff	P
1.	(Nigeria) Plateau Peaks	6	5	1	479	301	+178	11
2.	(Guinea) BACK	6	5	1	381	346	+35	11
3.	(Ivory Coast) Africa Sports	6	4	2	304	312	-8	10
4.	(Ivory Coast) Zenith BC	6	3	3	348	322	+26	9
5.	(Benin) ASPAC	5	2	3	303	354	−51	7
6.	(Nigeria) Ebun Comets	5	2	3	301	360	−59	7
7.	(Ghana) CEPS Braves	5	1	4	301	360	−59	6
8.	(Togo) CBS	5	1	4	301	360	−59	6
9.	(Liberia) NPA Pythons	4	1	3	301	360	−59	5
10.	(Liberia) Invincible Eleven	4	0	4	301	360	−59	4

October 7, 2006

Africa Sports (Ivory Coast)	75–50	(Togo) CBS

October 7, 2006

Invincible Eleven (Liberia)	72–81	(Benin) ASPAC

October 8, 2006

NPA Pythons (Liberia)	66–64	(Ghana) CEPS Braves

October 8, 2006

Zenith BC (Ivory Coast)	68–53	(Nigeria) Ebun Comets

October 9, 2006

Plateau Peaks (Nigeria)	94–41	(Togo) CBS

October 9, 2006

BACK (Guinea)	73–55	(Nigeria) Ebun Comets

October 9, 2006

NPA Pythons (Liberia)	66–76	(Ivory Coast) Zenith BC

October 9, 2006

Invincible Eleven (Liberia)	42–55	(Ivory Coast) Africa Sports

October 10, 2006

CEPS Braves (Ghana)	65–74	(Ivory Coast) Zenith BC

October 10, 2006

Plateau Peaks (Nigeria)	94–58	(Liberia) Invincible Eleven

October 10, 2006

BACK (Guinea)	52–51	(Liberia) NPA Pythons

October 10, 2006

ASPAC (Benin)	68–73	(Ivory Coast) Africa Sports

October 11, 2006

CBS (Togo)	80–67	(Liberia) Invincible Eleven

October 11, 2006

Ebun Comets (Nigeria)	77–73	(Liberia) NPA Pythons

October 11, 2006

CEPS Braves (Ghana)	57–68	(Guinea) BACK

October 11, 2006

ASPAC (Benin)	56–73	(Nigeria) Plateau Peaks

October 12, 2006

Ebun Comets (Nigeria)	57–71	(Ghana) CEPS Braves

October 12, 2006

CBS (Togo)	37–73	(Benin) ASPAC

October 12, 2006

Africa Sports (Ivory Coast)	61–68	(Nigeria) Plateau Peaks

October 12, 2006

Zenith BC (Ivory Coast)	39–55	(Guinea) BACK

October 13, 2006

Invincible Eleven (Liberia)	vs.	(Liberia) NPA Pythons

October 13, 2006

Ebun Comets (Nigeria)	72–36	(Togo) CBS

October 13, 2006

ASPAC (Benin)	82–79	(Ghana) CEPS Braves

October 13, 2006

BACK (Guinea)	50–52	(Ivory Coast) Africa Sports

October 13, 2006

Zenith BC (Ivory Coast)	65–79	(Nigeria) Plateau Peaks

October 14, 2006

Zenith BC (Ivory Coast)	58–66	(Guinea) BACK

October 14, 2006

Plateau Peaks (Nigeria)	67–57	(Ivory Coast) Africa Sports

== See also ==
- 2006 FIBA Africa Basketball Club Championship squads
