= 2006 FIBA Africa Clubs Champions Cup =

2006 FIBA Africa Champions Cup
21st FIBA Africa Champions Cup

Tournament details
- Host country: Nigeria
- Dates: November 18 – 26
- Teams: 12 (from 53 federations)
- Venue: 1 (in 1 host city)

Final positions
- Champions: Angola (3rd title)

Tournament statistics
- MVP: (Angola) Mílton Barros
- Top scorer: (Nigeria) S.Gumut 20.57
- Top rebounds: (Republic of the Congo) Ibaka 9.56
- Top assists: (Republic of the Congo) Itoua 4.57
- PPG (Team): (Angola) 1º Agosto 85.20
- RPG (Team): (South Africa) ESPN 45.40
- APG (Team): (Angola) Petro 19.20

Official website
- Official Website

The 2006 FIBA Africa Basketball Club Championship (21st edition), was an international basketball tournament held in Lagos, Nigeria, from November 18 to 26, 2006. The tournament, organized by FIBA Africa and hosted by Dodan Warriors, was contested by 12 clubs split into 2 groups of 6, the first four of which qualifying for the knock-out stage.

The tournament was won by Petro Atlético from Angola.

== Draw ==
Group A	Group B
(Guinea) BACK (Nigeria) Dodan Warriors (Republic of the Congo) Inter Club Brazzaville (Kenya) KCB Lions (Angola) Petro Atlético (Ivory Coast) Zenith BC	(Ivory Coast) Abidjan Basket Club (Democratic Republic of the Congo) BC Onatra (Ivory Coast) Africa Sports (South Africa) ESPN / AND 1 (Nigeria) Plateau Peaks (Angola) Primeiro de Agosto

== Preliminary rounds ==
Times given below are in UTC+1.

=== Group A ===
Qualified for the quarter-finals

	Group A	M	W	L	PF	PA	Diff	P
1.	(Angola) Petro Atlético	5	5	0	479	301	+178	10
2.	(Nigeria) Dodan Warriors	5	4	1	381	346	+35	8
3.	(Republic of the Congo) Inter Club Brazzaville	5	4	1	348	322	+26	8
4.	(Ivory Coast) Zenith BC	5	2	3	304	312	-8	4
5.	(Kenya) KCB Lions	5	1	4	303	354	−51	2
6.	(Guinea) BACK	5	0	5	301	360	−59	0

November 18, 2006
12:00

Report

Inter Club (Republic of the Congo)	82–67	(Kenya) KCB Lions
Scoring by quarter: 24–16, 13–22, 25–17, 20–12
Pts: Kouguere 29; Rebs: Kouguere, Ibaka 10; Asts: Ampele 5		Pts: Odera 23; Rebs: three players 6 Asts: Oloo 6

Indoor Sports Hall, Surulere

November 18, 2006
16:00

Report

Zenith BC (Ivory Coast)	54–75	(Nigeria) Dodan Warriors
Scoring by quarter: 5–20, 12–26, 25–14, 12–15
Pts: Traore 18; Rebs: Kouguere, K.Kone 9 Asts: Yanga 3		Pts: Muhammed 14; Rebs: Ujoh 10; Asts: Daudu 7

Indoor Sports Hall, Surulere

November 18, 2006
20:00

Report

BACK (Guinea)	62–105	(Angola) Petro Atlético
Scoring by quarter: 18–26, 12–22, 18–23, 14–34
Pts: S.Condé 23; Rebs: Sangaré 6 Asts: M.Condé 3		Pts: C.Morais 19; Rebs: Gentry 8 Asts: Mílton, C.Morais 5

Indoor Sports Hall, Surulere

November 19, 2006

Inter Club (Republic of the Congo)	20–0	(Guinea) BACK
Scoring by quarter: n/a
Pts: n/a Rebs: n/a Asts: n/a		Pts: n/a Rebs: n/a Asts: n/a

Indoor Sports Hall, Surulere

November 19, 2006
16:00

Report

Dodan Warriors (Nigeria)	105–82	(Kenya) KCB Lions
Scoring by quarter: 26–17, 24–16, 29–24, 26–25
Pts: Omori 17; Rebs: Adebayo 10; Asts: Yusuf 5		Pts: Odera 26; Rebs: Juma 8 Asts: Oloo, Awuor 2

Indoor Sports Hall, Surulere

November 19, 2006
20:00

Report

Zenith BC (Ivory Coast)	37–85	(Angola) Petro Atlético
Scoring by quarter: 9–26, 5–21, 14–17, 9–21
Pts: Kouadio 8 Rebs: Lagui 9 Asts: five players 1		Pts: C.Morais, Mingas 13; Rebs: Mingas, Gentry 8 Asts: Mílton, Gentry 4

Indoor Sports Hall, Surulere

November 20, 2006
10:00

Report

KCB Lions (Kenya)	69–67	(Guinea) BACK
Scoring by quarter: 14–17, 17–5, 21–22, 17–23
Pts: Juma 20; Rebs: Odera 10; Asts: Oloo 4		Pts: Soumaoro 26; Rebs: S.Condé 18; Asts: M.Condé 4

Indoor Sports Hall, Surulere

November 20, 2006
12:00

Report

Zenith BC (Ivory Coast)	44–82	(Republic of the Congo) Inter Club
Scoring by quarter: 8–13, 15–22, 16–28, 5–19
Pts: Toh 14; Rebs: D.Kone 13; Asts: Kouadio, K.Kone 3		Pts: Ibaka 17; Rebs: Kondzy 13; Asts: Elenga 6

Indoor Sports Hall, Surulere

November 20, 2006
16:00

Report

Petro Atlético (Angola)	98–73	(Nigeria) Dodan Warriors
Scoring by quarter: 26–19, 26–17, 30–17, 16–20
Pts: Mílton 26; Rebs: Mingas 13; Asts: Mílton 6		Pts: Yusuf 26; Rebs: Ujoh 13; Asts: Muhammed 3

Indoor Sports Hall, Surulere

November 21, 2006
10:00

Report

Petro Atlético (Angola)	96–75	(Republic of the Congo) Inter Club
Scoring by quarter: 29–13, 19–13, 27–24, 21–25
Pts: L.Costa 17; Rebs: Gentry 6 Asts: Mingas, Bonifácio 6		Pts: Ibaka 19; Rebs: Ibaka, Badibake 7 Asts: Ampele 4

Indoor Sports Hall, Surulere

November 21, 2006
16:00

Report

Dodan Warriors (Nigeria)	84–73	(Guinea) BACK
Scoring by quarter: 10–15, 17–24, 29–15, 28–19
Pts: Yusuf 23; Rebs: Omori 10; Asts: Daudu 5		Pts: M.Condé 23; Rebs: M.Condé, S.Condé 8 Asts: Sylla 4

Indoor Sports Hall, Surulere

November 21, 2006
20:00

Report

KCB Lions (Kenya)	42–59	(Ivory Coast) Zenith BC
Scoring by quarter: 11–21, 10–14, 11–13, 10–11
Pts: Juma 10; Rebs: Otiso 6 Asts: Oloo 3		Pts: Agbe 17; Rebs: Yanga 11; Asts: Kouadio 5

Indoor Sports Hall, Surulere

November 22, 2006
12:00

Report

BACK (Guinea)	73–65	(Ivory Coast) Zenith BC
Scoring by quarter: 23–15, 12–15, 24–16, 14–19
Pts: three players 13; Rebs: M.Condé 6 Asts: Mohamed, K.Conde 3		Pts: D.Kone 14; Rebs: D.Kone, Fondjo 6 Asts: D.Kone 3

Indoor Sports Hall, Surulere

November 22, 2006
14:00

Report

Petro Atlético (Angola)	95–54	(Kenya) KCB Lions
Scoring by quarter: 23–7, 21–24, 31–6, 20–17
Pts: Bonifácio, F.Camacho 12; Rebs: Mingas, L.Paulo 10; Asts: Crooks 6		Pts: Kirui 14; Rebs: three players 6 Asts: Oloo 3

Indoor Sports Hall, Surulere

November 22, 2006
16:00

Report

Dodan Warriors (Nigeria)	87–78	(Republic of the Congo) Inter Club
Scoring by quarter: 16–21, 34–23, 20–12, 17–22
Pts: Omori 20; Rebs: Yusuf 14; Asts: Daudu 5		Pts: Nguia 16; Rebs: Kadima 14; Asts: four players 2

Indoor Sports Hall, Surulere

=== Group B ===
Qualified for the quarter-finals

	Group B	M	W	L	PF	PA	Diff	P
1.	(Angola) Primeiro de Agosto	5	5	0	402	349	+53	10
2.	(Ivory Coast) Abidjan BC	5	4	1	411	338	+73	8
3.	(South Africa) ESPN / AND 1	5	3	2	321	304	+17	6
4.	(Nigeria) Plateau Peaks	5	1	4	302	348	-46	2
5.	(Ivory Coast) Africa Sports	5	1	4	345	368	-23	2
6.	(Democratic Republic of the Congo) BC Onatra	5	1	4	311	385	-74	2

November 18, 2006
10:00

Report

ESPN / AND 1 (South Africa)	65–80	(Ivory Coast) Abidjan BC
Scoring by quarter: 10–20, 16–20, 19–27, 20–13
Pts: Denyssen 13; Rebs: Molebatsi 6 Asts: Itoua 7		Pts: S.Konaté 26; Rebs: Besse 9 Asts: Touali 4

Indoor Sports Hall, Surulere

November 18, 2006
14:00

Report

1º de Agosto (Angola)	88–59	(Nigeria) Plateau Peaks
Scoring by quarter: 26–11, 17–12, 26–23, 19–13
Pts: Mayzer 16; Rebs: Kikas 6 Asts: Lutonda 6		Pts: Gumut 30; Rebs: three players 5 Asts: Emmanuel 2

Indoor Sports Hall, Surulere

November 18, 2006
18:00

Report

BC Onatra (Democratic Republic of the Congo)	49–66	(Ivory Coast) Africa Sports
Scoring by quarter: 18–19, 7–18, 8–14, 16–15
Pts: Lukusa 8 Rebs: Mulamba 10; Asts: Mulamba, Mbowa 2		Pts: Kamate 13; Rebs: Kraidy 10; Asts: Alayande 4

Indoor Sports Hall, Surulere

November 19, 2006
10:00

Report

BC Onatra (Democratic Republic of the Congo)	53–92	(Angola) 1º de Agosto
Scoring by quarter: 11–22, 15–23, 16–22, 11–25
Pts: Moenge 21; Rebs: Mbowa 6 Asts: Mbowa 4		Pts: Kikas 17; Rebs: Abdel 9 Asts: C.Almeida 6

Indoor Sports Hall, Surulere

November 19, 2006
14:00

Report

ESPN / AND 1 (South Africa)	98–93	(Nigeria) Plateau Peaks
Scoring by quarter: 26–26, 30–25, 18–19, 24–23
Pts: Mothiba 24; Rebs: Mothiba, Yele 9 Asts: Molebatsi 5		Pts: Usman 24; Rebs: Ngusha 8 Asts: Emmanuel 4

Indoor Sports Hall, Surulere

November 19, 2006
18:00

Report

Abidjan BC (Ivory Coast)	74–48	(Ivory Coast) Africa Sports
Scoring by quarter: 29–7, 16–17, 13–13, 16–11
Pts: S.Konaté 24; Rebs: Kouyate 8 Asts: six players 2		Pts: Ouattara 12; Rebs: Ouattara 8 Asts: three players 1

Indoor Sports Hall, Surulere

November 20, 2006
14:00

Report

Africa Sports (Ivory Coast)	47–101	(Angola) 1º de Agosto
Scoring by quarter: 14–32, 6–17, 8–29, 19–23
Pts: Traoré 12; Rebs: five players 3 Asts: three players 2		Pts: Olímpio 22; Rebs: Kikas 7 Asts: C.Almeida 6

Indoor Sports Hall, Surulere

November 20, 2006
18:00

Report

ESPN / AND 1 (South Africa)	88–60	(Democratic Republic of the Congo) BC Onatra
Scoring by quarter: 27–9, 20–13, 21–20, 20–18
Pts: Molebatsi 26; Rebs: Molebatsi 14; Asts: Itoua 11		Pts: Moenge 15; Rebs: Nzuzi, Samuna 5 Asts: Mbowa 3

Indoor Sports Hall, Surulere

November 20, 2006
20:00

Report

Plateau Peaks (Nigeria)	64–67	(Ivory Coast) Abidjan BC
Scoring by quarter: 15–16, 20–20, 13–20, 16–11
Pts: Usman 20; Rebs: Omaga 11; Asts: Emmanuel 4		Pts: Touali 16; Rebs: Touali, Kouyate 9 Asts: four players 2

Indoor Sports Hall, Surulere

November 21, 2006
12:00

Report

Plateau Peaks (Nigeria)	87–62	(Democratic Republic of the Congo) BC Onatra
Scoring by quarter: 24–18, 13–22, 36–9, 14–13
Pts: Gumut 28; Rebs: Gumut 10; Asts: Gumut 7		Pts: Moenge 15; Rebs: Mbowa, Ndelo 7 Asts: Mbowa 8

Indoor Sports Hall, Surulere

November 21, 2006
14:00

Report

Africa Sports (Ivory Coast)	49–73	(South Africa) ESPN / AND 1
Scoring by quarter: 19–15, 9–11, 13–21, 8–26
Pts: Tiene 11; Rebs: Tiene 10; Asts: Alayande 2		Pts: Denyssen 22; Rebs: Molebatsi 17; Asts: Itoua 4

Indoor Sports Hall, Surulere

November 21, 2006
18:00

Report

Abidjan BC (Ivory Coast)	53–97	(Angola) 1º de Agosto
Scoring by quarter: 16–20, 6–26, 17–14, 14–37
Pts: Besse 11; Rebs: Kokoun 10; Asts: Touali 2		Pts: Olímpio 23; Rebs: Muzadi, Ângelo 9 Asts: Olímpio 4

Indoor Sports Hall, Surulere

November 22, 2006
10:00

Report

Plateau Peaks (Nigeria)	84–67	(Ivory Coast) Africa Sports
Scoring by quarter: 24–21, 16–18, 24–18, 20–10
Pts: Usman 19; Rebs: Gumut 11; Asts: Emmanuel 7		Pts: Kamate 22; Rebs: Ouattara 7 Asts: Esmel 2

Indoor Sports Hall, Surulere

November 21, 2006
12:00

Report

Abidjan BC (Ivory Coast)	64–46	(Democratic Republic of the Congo) BC Onatra
Scoring by quarter: 21–10, 18–12, 13–10, 12–14
Pts: S.Konaté 23; Rebs: Besse 6 Asts: Amalabian 6		Pts: Ndelo 15; Rebs: Nzuzi, Ndelo 5 Asts: Mbowa 4

Indoor Sports Hall, Surulere

November 22, 2006
20:00

Report

1º de Agosto (Ivory Coast)	97–62	(South Africa) ESPN / AND 1
Scoring by quarter: 27–15, 25–8, 24–18, 21–21
Pts: Abdel 16; Rebs: A.Costa 9 Asts: Olímpio, A.Costa 5		Pts: Mndaweni 16; Rebs: Molebatsi 6 Asts: Mndaweni 4

Indoor Sports Hall, Surulere

== Knockout stage ==
9th-12th Place
Friday, 24 November 10:00
(Democratic Republic of the Congo) BC Onatra	73
(Kenya) KCB Lions	57
Friday, 24 November 12:00
(Guinea) BACK	46
(Ivory Coast) Africa Sports	55

9th place
Saturday, 25 November 13:00
(Democratic Republic of the Congo) BC Onatra	54
(Nigeria) Africa Sports	59
11th place
Saturday, 25 November 10:00
(Democratic Republic of the Congo) KCB Lions	44
(Rwanda) BACK	56

Quarter-finals
Friday, 24 November – 14:00
(Nigeria) Plateau Peaks	56
(Angola) Petro Atlético	78
Friday, 24 November – 20:00
(Republic of the Congo) Inter Club	82
(Ivory Coast) Abidjan BC	77
Friday, 24 November – 18:00
(Ivory Coast) Zenith BC	45
(Angola) 1º de Agosto	90
Friday, 24 November – 16:00
(Nigeria) Dodan Warriors	77
(South Africa) ESPN / AND 1	61

5th-8th Place
Saturday, 25 November 13:00
(Nigeria) Plateau Peaks	68
(Ivory Coast) Abidjan BC	76
Saturday, 25 November 19:00
(Ivory Coast) Zenith BC	38
(South Africa) ESPN / AND 1	61

5th place
Sunday, 26 November 13:00
(Ivory Coast) Abidjan BC	58
(South Africa) ESPN / AND 1	61
7th place
Saturday, 25 November 11:00
(Nigeria) Plateau Peaks	91
(Ivory Coast) Zenith BC	54

Quarter-finals
Friday, 24 November – 14:00
(Nigeria) Plateau Peaks	56
(Angola) Petro Atlético	78
Friday, 24 November – 20:00
(Republic of the Congo) Inter Club	82
(Ivory Coast) Abidjan BC	77
Friday, 24 November – 18:00
(Ivory Coast) Zenith BC	45
(Angola) 1º de Agosto	90
Friday, 24 November – 16:00
(Nigeria) Dodan Warriors	77
(South Africa) ESPN / AND 1	61

Semi-finals
Saturday, 25 November – 15:00
(Angola) Petro Atlético	93
(Republic of the Congo) Inter Club	68
Saturday, 25 November – 17:00
(Angola) 1º de Agosto	83
(Nigeria) Dodan Warriors	61

Final
Sunday, 26 November – 17:00
(Angola) Petro Atlético	76
(Angola) 1º de Agosto	71
Third place
Sunday, 26 November – 15:00
(Republic of the Congo) Inter Club	66
(Nigeria) Dodan Warriors	75

=== Quarter-finals ===
November 24, 2006
14:00

Report

Plateau Peaks (Nigeria)	56–78	(Angola) Petro Atlético
Scoring by quarter: 13–13, 18–18, 11–24, 14–23
Pts: Gumut, Emmanuel 14; Rebs: Ngusha 8 Asts: Emmanuel 3		Pts: C.Morais 16; Rebs: Mingas 18; Asts: Mingas, F.Albano 5

Indoor Sports Hall, Surulere

November 24, 2006
16:00

Report

Dodan Warriors (Nigeria)	77–61	(South Africa) ESPN / AND 1
Scoring by quarter: 18–14, 12–19, 26–12, 21–16
Pts: Omori 17; Rebs: Omori 10; Asts: Yusuf 4		Pts: Dlamini 11; Rebs: Molebatsi 8 Asts: Itoua 4

Indoor Sports Hall, Surulere

November 24, 2006
18:00

Report

Zenith BC (Ivory Coast)	45–90	(Angola) 1º de Agosto
Scoring by quarter: 14–24, 4–22, 10–20, 17–24
Pts: D.Kone 16; Rebs: D.Kone 5 Asts: K.Kone 3		Pts: Kikas 16; Rebs: Muzadi 8 Asts: Lutonda 6

Indoor Sports Hall, Surulere

November 24, 2006
20:00

Report

Inter Club (Republic of the Congo)	82–77	(Ivory Coast) Abidjan BC
Scoring by quarter: 15–19, 22–10, 25–20, 20–28
Pts: Kouguere 25; Rebs: Kondzy 13; Asts: Kadima 8		Pts: S.Konaté 20; Rebs: S.Konaté, Kouyate 6 Asts: Amalabian 3

Indoor Sports Hall, Surulere

=== 9th-12th place ===
November 24, 2006
10:00

Report

BC Onatra (Democratic Republic of the Congo)	73–57	(Kenya) KCB Lions
Scoring by quarter: 18–19, 16–9, 15–15, 24–14
Pts: Nzuzi 19; Rebs: Nzuzi 7 Asts: Mbowa 6		Pts: Kikas 13; Rebs: Kirui 9 Asts: Maina 4

Indoor Sports Hall, Surulere

November 24, 2006
12:00

Report

BACK (Guinea)	46–55	(Ivory Coast) Africa Sports
Scoring by quarter: 12–12, 9–10, 9–19, 16–14
Pts: Condé 17; Rebs: Condé 9 Asts: Sylla 3		Pts: Alayande 19; Rebs: Kraidy 11; Asts: Alayande 5

Indoor Sports Hall, Surulere

=== 5th-8th place ===
November 25, 2006
13:00

Report

Plateau Peaks (Nigeria)	68–76	(Ivory Coast) Abidjan BC
Scoring by quarter: 8–25, 25–17, 13–16, 22–18
Pts: n/a Rebs: n/a Asts: n/a		Pts: n/a Rebs: n/a Asts: n/a

Indoor Sports Hall, Surulere

November 25, 2006
19:00

Report

Zenith BC (Ivory Coast)	38–61	(South Africa) ESPN / AND 1
Scoring by quarter: 14–9, 5–11, 11–21, 8–20
Pts: Toh 15; Rebs: K.Kone 7 Asts: D.Kone 3		Pts: Mothiba 22; Rebs: Yele 15; Asts: Mndaweni 5

Indoor Sports Hall, Surulere

=== Semifinals ===
November 25, 2006
15:00

Report

Petro Atlético (Angola)	93–68	(Republic of the Congo) Inter Club
Scoring by quarter: 28–20, 23–10, 22–20, 20–18
Pts: Gentry 29; Rebs: Gentry, Mingas 8 Asts: Mingas 7		Pts: Kouguere 29; Rebs: Ibaka 11; Asts: Kadima 4

Indoor Sports Hall, Surulere

November 25, 2006
17:00

Report

1º de Agosto (Angola)	83–61	(Nigeria) Dodan Warriors
Scoring by quarter: 21–8, 19–14, 20–20, 23–19
Pts: Kikas 18; Rebs: Kikas 12; Asts: C.Almeida 12		Pts: Ayodele 15; Rebs: Yusuf 9 Asts: Ayodele 5

Indoor Sports Hall, Surulere

=== 11th place ===
November 25, 2006
10:00

Report

KCB Lions (Kenya)	44–56	(Guinea) BACK
Scoring by quarter: 11–10, 7–10, 12–10, 14–26
Pts: n/a Rebs: n/a Asts: n/a		Pts: n/a Rebs: n/a Asts: n/a

Indoor Sports Hall, Surulere

=== 9th place ===
November 25, 2006
13:00

Report

BC Onatra (Democratic Republic of the Congo)	54–59	(Ivory Coast) Africa Sports
Scoring by quarter: 12–17, 17–7, 15–16, 10–19
Pts: n/a Rebs: n/a Asts: n/a		Pts: n/a Rebs: n/a Asts: n/a

Indoor Sports Hall, Surulere

=== 7th place ===
November 25, 2006
11:00

Report

Plateau Peaks (Nigeria)	91–54	(Ivory Coast) Zenith BC
Scoring by quarter: 23–12, 23–16, 25–11, 20–15
Pts: Gumut 25; Rebs: Emmanuel 5 Asts: Emmanuel 6		Pts: Traore 21; Rebs: Toure 6 Asts: Fondjo, Yanga 3

Indoor Sports Hall, Surulere

=== 5th place ===
November 26, 2006
13:00

Report

Abidjan BC (Ivory Coast)	58–61	(South Africa) ESPN / AND 1
Scoring by quarter: 21–18, 12–12, 12–13, 13–18
Pts: Touali 18; Rebs: Three players, 5 Asts: Touali 3		Pts: Molebatsi 17; Rebs: Yele 10; Asts: Itoua 3

Indoor Sports Hall, Surulere

=== Bronze medal game ===
November 26, 2006
15:00

Report

Inter Club (Republic of the Congo)	66–75	(Nigeria) Dodan Warriors
Scoring by quarter: 14–23, 20–16, 19–20, 13–16
Pts: Kouguere 15; Rebs: Ibaka 11; Asts: Kadima, Kondzy 2		Pts: Yusuf 25; Rebs: Omori, Uma-Okoro 10; Asts: Daudu 6

Indoor Sports Hall, Surulere

=== Gold medal game ===
November 26, 2006
17:00

Report

Petro Atlético (Angola)	76–71	(Angola) 1º de Agosto
Scoring by quarter: 20–20, 13–15, 20–20, 23–16
Pts: Mingas 17; Rebs: Mingas 11; Asts: Crooks 4		Pts: Lutonda 22; Rebs: Abdel 9 Asts: Kikas, A.Costa 3

Indoor Sports Hall, Surulere

== Final standings ==
Rank	Team	Record
Gold medal	(Angola) Petro Atlético	8–0
Silver medal	(Angola) Primeiro de Agosto	7–1
Bronze medal	(Nigeria) Dodan Warriors	6–2
4	(Republic of the Congo) Inter Club	5–3
5	(South Africa) ESPN/AND 1	5–3
6	(Ivory Coast) Abidjan Basket Club	5–3
7	(Nigeria) Plateau Peaks	2–6
8	(Ivory Coast) Zenith Basketball Club	2–6
9	(Ivory Coast) Africa Sports	3–4
10	(Democratic Republic of the Congo) BC Onatra	2–5
11	(Guinea) BACK	2–5
12	(Kenya) KCB Lions	1–6

Petro Atlético roster
Carlos Morais, Domingos Bonifácio, Eduardo Mingas, Feliciano Camacho, Fernando Albano, Frederick Gentry, Jorge Tati, Leonel Paulo, Luís Costa, Mílton Barros, Shannon Crooks, Víctor de Carvalho, Coach: Alberto de Carvalho

== All Tournament Team ==
G	(Angola) Mílton Barros
G	(Angola) Armando Costa
F	(Nigeria) Bukar Muhammed
F	(Nigeria) Stanley Gumut
C	(Republic of the Congo) Serge Ibaka

2006 FIBA Africa Clubs Champions Cup

Atlético Petróleos de Luanda
1st Title

Most Valuable Player
(Angola) Mílton Barros

== See also ==
2007 FIBA Africa Championship
