= University of Johannesburg men's basketball =

UJ Orange Wave
- Leagues: Inner City Super League
- Founded: 2011
- History: University of Johannesburg (2011–present)
- Location: Johannesburg, Gauteng Province, South Africa
- Team colors: Orange, Black
- Head coach: Mandla Ngema
- Championships: 1 ICSL; 1 USSA championship
- Website: Official Web Site

The University of Johannesburg men's basketball team, also known as the UJ Orange Wave, is the basketball team of the sports department of the University of Johannesburg. Several of the team's players belong to the elite of South Africa and have played for the South Africa national basketball team. The team plays in the Inner City Super League (ICSL), in which they face other teams from Greater Johannesburg. They won the ICSL title in 2023.

In 2023 they were crowned USSA Basketball Champions after going unbeaten in the championship under head coach Mandla Ngema.

== Notable players ==
Note: Flags indicate national team eligibility at FIBA-sanctioned events. Players may hold other non-FIBA nationalities not displayed.

- (South Africa) Masego Loate
- (South Africa) Amogelang Keogatile
- (South Africa) Kegorapetse David Letsebe

== Honours ==
- Inner City Super League: 2023
- USSA Basketball Champions: 2023
