= Pretoria Heat =

- Founded: 2003
- Location: Pretoria, Gauteng Province, South Africa
- Team colors: Red, White

Pretoria Heat is a basketball team in from Pretoria, Gauteng Province, South Africa. Traditionally, the team has provided the South Africa national basketball team with several key players, including Shane Marhanele and Neo Mothiba who both played in the starting lineup at the 2011 FIBA Africa Championship in Madagascar.

== Notable players ==
Note: Flags indicate national team eligibility at FIBA-sanctioned events. Players may hold other non-FIBA nationalities not displayed.

- (South Africa) Shane Marhanele
- (South Africa) Neo Mothiba
- (Rwanda) Raoul Mballa
