= 2001 FIBA Africa Championship =

Tournament details
- Host country: Morocco
- Dates: 4–12 August
- Teams: 12
- Venues: 2 (in 2 host cities)

Final positions
- Champions: Angola (6th title)
- Runners-up: Algeria
- Third place: Egypt
- Fourth place: Tunisia

Tournament statistics
- MVP: (Angola) Miguel Lutonda
- Top scorer: (Morocco) Miloud Dahine (21.4 points per game)

The 2001 FIBA Africa Championship was hosted by Morocco from August 4 to August 12, 2001. The games were played in Rabat and Casablanca. The top two countries in this FIBA Africa Championship earned the two berths allocated to Africa for the 2002 FIBA World Championship in the United States. Angola won the tournament, the country's 6th African championship, by beating Algeria 78-68 in the final. Both teams qualified for the 2002 FIBA World Championship.

== Draw ==
Group 1	Group 2
Egypt; Ivory Coast; Mali; Morocco; Mozambique; Tunisia	Algeria; Angola; Central African Republic; Nigeria; Senegal; South Africa

== Preliminary round ==
=== Group A ===
Team	Pts	Pld	W	L	PF	PA	Diff
Egypt	9	5	4	1	412	395	+17
Tunisia	9	5	4	1	389	368	+21
Morocco	8	5	3	2	397	382	+15
(Ivory Coast) Côte d'Ivoire	7	5	2	3	365	357	+8
Mozambique	6	5	1	4	356	393	-37
Mali	6	5	1	4	374	398	-24

Day 1

Morocco	78–57	Mozambique
Mali	76–77	Tunisia
Egypt	83–81	(Ivory Coast) Côte d'Ivoire

Day 2

Mozambique	74–87	Tunisia
Egypt	77–69	Mali
Côte d'Ivoire (Ivory Coast)	80–67	Morocco

Day 3

Mozambique	80–86	Egypt
Côte d'Ivoire (Ivory Coast)	71–79	Mali
Tunisia	80–76	Morocco

Day 4

Egypt	84–77	Tunisia
Côte d'Ivoire (Ivory Coast)	75–60	Mozambique
Mali	83–88	Morocco

Day 5

Tunisia	68–58	(Ivory Coast) Côte d'Ivoire
Mozambique	85–67	Mali
Egypt	82–88	Morocco

=== Group B ===
Team	Pts	Pld	W	L	PF	PA	Diff
Algeria	9	5	4	1	362	297	+65
Angola	9	5	4	1	339	278	+61
Nigeria	9	5	4	1	305	280	+25
Senegal	7	5	2	3	354	305	+49
Central African Republic	6	5	1	4	305	354	-49
South Africa	5	5	0	5	211	362	-151

Day 1

South Africa	46–76	Algeria
Angola	71–57	Central African Republic
Senegal	65–80	Nigeria

Day 2

Senegal	104–49	Central African Republic
Angola	70–78	Algeria
South Africa	47–64	Nigeria

Day 3

South Africa	37–69	Senegal
Central African Republic	66–79	Algeria
Angola	54–43	Nigeria

Day 4

Nigeria	59–58	Algeria
Central African Republic	77–41	South Africa
Senegal	60–68	Angola

Day 5

Angola	76–40	South Africa
Central African Republic	56–59	Nigeria
Algeria	71–56	Senegal

== Knockout stage ==
Semi-finals
August 11, 2001
Egypt	60
Angola	72
August 11, 2001
Algeria	77
Tunisia	76

Final
August 12, 2001
Algeria	68
Angola	78
Third place
August 12, 2001
Tunisia	71
Egypt	77

== Classification Stage ==
Nigeria	79–66	Morocco
Côte d'Ivoire (Ivory Coast)	60–73	Senegal
Central African Republic	79–63	Mozambique
Mali	63–54	South Africa

== Final standings ==
Rank	Team	Record
1	Angola	6-1
2	Algeria	5-2
3	Egypt	5-2
4	Tunisia	4-3
5	Nigeria	5-1
6	Morocco	4-2
7	Senegal	3-3
8	(Ivory Coast) Côte d'Ivoire	2-4
9	Central African Republic	2-4
10	Mozambique	1-5
11	Mali	2-4
12	South Africa	0-6

Angola and Algeria qualified for the 2002 FIBA World Championship in the United States.

2001 FIBA Africa Championship winners

Angola
Sixth title

Most Valuable Player
(Angola) Miguel Lutonda

=== All tournament team ===
- G (Angola) Miguel Lutonda
- G (Algeria) Ali Bouziane
- F (Angola) Edmar Victoriano
- F (Tunisia) Ali El Amri
- C (Egypt) Haytham Darwish

== Statistical leaders ==
Points

Rank	Name	PPG
1	(Morocco) Miloud Dahine	21.4
2	(Central African Republic) Romain Sato	19
3	(Tunisia) Ali El Amri	17.4
4	(Mali) Amara Sy	16.8
5	(Algeria) Ali Bouziane	15.8

Rebounds

Rank	Name	RPG
1	(Central African Republic) Romain Sato	10
1	(Morocco) Mounir Bouhelal	10
1	(Tunisia) Mejdi Maalaoui	10
4	(Nigeria) Olumide Oyedeji	8.6
5	(Egypt) Ismail Abdel-Moneim	7.2

Assists

Rank	Name	APG
1	(Egypt) Islam Aly Ibrahim	2.4
2	(Egypt) Ismail Abdel-Moneim	1.6
3	(Egypt) Osama El-Sayed	1.5
4	(Algeria) Ali Bouziane	1.4
4	(Ivory Coast) Blaise Amalabian	1.4

== See also ==
- 2000 FIBA Africa Clubs Champions Cup
