= Fumani Marhanele =

South African basketball player

Limpopo Pride
- Position: Small forward / shooting guard
- League: Basketball National League

Personal information
- Born: August 28, 1982 (age 44) Pretoria, South Africa
- Listed height: 6 ft 6 in (1.98 m)

Career information
- Playing career: 2010–present

Career history
- 2014–present: Limpopo Pride

Shane Fumani Marhanele (born August 28, 1982), is a South African professional basketball player. He currently plays for Limpopo Pride of the Basketball National League in South Africa.

He represented South Africa's national basketball team at the 2011 FIBA Africa Championship in Antananarivo, Madagascar, where he was his team's top scorer.
