= Nhlanhla Dlamini =

South African basketball player

Nhlanhla Dlamini (born 2 September 1986) is a South African basketball player with Vaal University of South Africa's Premier Basketball League. He is also a member of the South Africa national basketball team and appeared with the club at the 2009 African Championship. He is a point guard.
