= Fred Gentry =

American basketball player (born 1977)

Frederick Gentry
Lobos da Malveira
- Position: Coach
- League: LCB

Personal information
- Born: July 7, 1977 (age 49) San Diego, California
- Listed height: 6 ft 8 in (2.03 m)
- Listed weight: 240 lb (109 kg)

Career information
- High school: DeQuincy (DeQuincy, Louisiana)
- College: McNeese State (1998–2002)
- NBA draft: 2002: undrafted
- Playing career: 2002–present

Career history
- 2003–2006: Ginásio
- 2006–2007: Petro de Luanda
- 2007–2008: FC Porto
- 2008–2009: Petro de Luanda
- 2009–2010: Interclube
- 2010–2011: CAB Madeira
- 2011–2016: Benfica
- 2016–present: CAB Madeira

Frederick Paul Gentry (born July 7, 1977) was a professional basketball player in Portugal and Angola and is now a coach in Lobos da Malveira. An American and a McNeese State Cowboys graduate, Gentry achieved greater success abroad, winning the African Club Champions in 2006 with Petro de Luanda. In Portugal, he collected over 20 honours, including four league titles.

== Career ==
Born in San Diego, California, Gentry started playing basketball at DeQuincy Highschool, in DeQuincy Louisiana earning a scholarship at McNeese State University. He competed in the NCAA Division I, with the Cowboys under coach Tic Price in his last year as senior, averaging 10.8 points per game, as the Cowboys lost in the Midwest Regional to the Bulldogs.

Undrafted, Gentry moved to Europe, starting his professional career in the Portuguese League, playing one season on the Azorean team, Lusitânia, before he moved to Ginásio da Figueira. There, he improved his scoring ability, increasing from 13.5 points per game in 2004–05, to 16 points per game in the next season.

This led to a move for the more competitive Angolan league, joining Petro de Luanda in 2006 and helping them win two leagues, one Cup, one African Club Champions, and having runner-up medals in the 2007 African Club Champions, and on the Angolan Supercup.

Gentry returned to Portugal on 23 August 2007, signing with FC Porto, helping the northerners conquer the League Cup in the only season there. He returned to Angola, to play another season at Petro de Luanda, but with much less success than before, he moved to Interclube on 16 September 2009.

The 33-year-old returned to Portugal on 25 August 2010, signing with CAB Madeira, and helping them win the Portuguese Cup, while averaging 16.7 points per game in the regular season, and 15.3 on the playoffs. On 5 June 2011, Gentry moved to Benfica, and became an important player for them in the following five years, winning four league titles and fourteen other cups. He also debuted in European competitions, in the 2014–15 EuroChallenge. At age 37, Gentry renewed his contract with Benfica for another season, and left the club in 2016 to play for a second time for CAB Madeira. He is now coach at Lobos da Malveira

== Honours ==
Ginásio

- Portuguese Basketball Champions Tournament: 2003–04

Petro Luanda

- Angolan Basketball League: 2005–06 2006–07
- Angola Cup: 2006–07
- African Club Champions: 2006

Porto

- League Cup / Hugo dos Santos Cup: 2007–08

CAB Madeira

- Portuguese Basketball Cup: 2010–11

Benfica

- Portuguese League: 2011–12, 2012–13, 2013–14, 2014–15
- Portuguese Basketball Cup: 2013–14, 2014–15, 2015–16
- League Cup / Hugo dos Santos Cup: 2012–13, 2013–14, 2014–15
- Super Cup: 2012, 2013, 2014, 2015
- António Pratas Trophy: 2011, 2012, 2014, 2015
