= Teddy Okobo Itoua =

Congolese basketball player

Teddy Okobo Itoua (born 29 April 1979) is a basketball player from the Republic of the Congo. He competed with the Republic of the Congo national basketball team at the 2009 African Championship, where he scored 2.2 points and 1.2 assists per game for the team as they struggled to a 16th-place finish in its first African Championship since 1985.
