= Chamberlain Oguchi =

Nigerian American basketball player

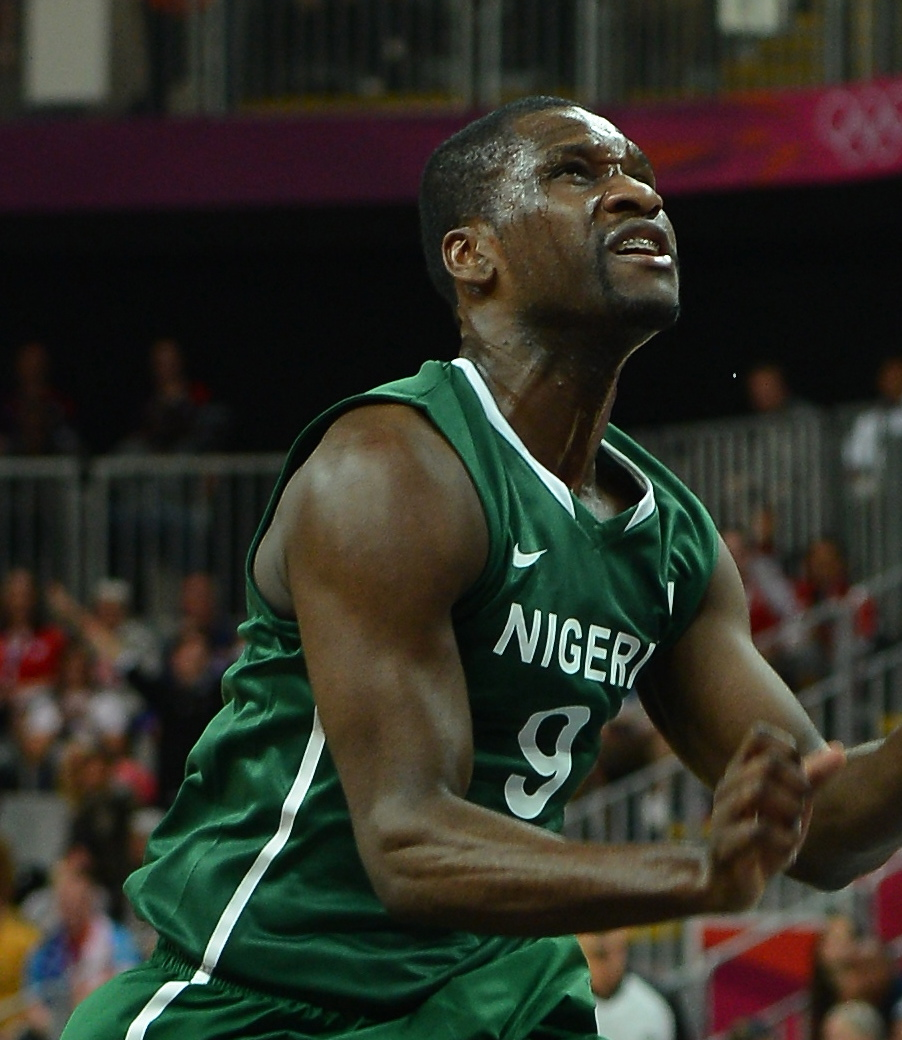
- Chamberlain Oguchi in the 2012 Olympics

Personal information
- Born: April 28, 1986 (age 40) Houston, Texas, U.S.
- Listed height: 6 ft 6 in (1.98 m)
- Listed weight: 200 lb (91 kg)

Career information
- High school: George Bush (Richmond, Texas)
- College: Oregon (2004–2007); Illinois State (2008–2009)
- NBA draft: 2009: undrafted
- Playing career: 2009–2018
- Position: Shooting guard / small forward

Career history
- 2009–2010: STB Le Havre
- 2010–2011: Maine Red Claws
- 2011: Meralco Bolts
- 2011–2012: Hoops Club
- 2012: Duhok
- 2012: Panteras de Miranda
- 2012: Meralco Bolts
- 2012–2013: Maine Red Claws
- 2013: Spartak Primorye
- 2013: Gran Canaria
- 2015–2016: Anwil Włocławek
- 2016–2017: Soles de Mexicali
- 2017: Boulazac Basket Dordogne
- 2018: Quimsa

Career highlights
- FIBA Africa Championship MVP (2015); FIBA Africa Championship Best 3pt Shooter (2015); FIBA Africa Championship All-Star 5 (2015); Liga Profesional de Baloncesto All-Star (2012); MVC Newcomer of the Year (2009); MVC 2nd Team All-Conference (2009); MVC All-Tournament Team (2009); Pac-10 All-Tournament Team (2006)
- Stats at Basketball Reference
Medals
Men's basketball
Representing Nigeria
FIBA Africa Championship
Gold medal – first place	2015 Tunisia
Bronze medal – third place	2005 Algeria

Chamberlain "Champ" Nnaemeka Oguchi (born April 28, 1986) is a former Nigerian-American former professional basketball player. His name "Emeka" is an abbreviation of the Igbo name "Chukwuemeka" (meaning "God has done so much").

== College career ==
Oguchi played college basketball for the Oregon Ducks from 2004 to 2007. Despite seeing limited minutes as a true freshman, he finished the season scoring double digits in 5 of the last 10 games and received the Jesse Lee Nash Most Improved Player Award for the 2004–2005 season.

As a sophomore, Oguchi connected on 40 of 68 three-point attempts during the last month of the season and broke the Pac-10 Tournament record for most 3-point field goals made (14). For his efforts, he received Pac-10 All-Tournament Team honors as well as the Jesse Lee Nash Most Improved Player Award for the second consecutive season.

Although an early season injury reduced Oguchi's role as a junior, he was an integral part of the 2006–2007 Oregon Ducks team that advanced to the NCAA Elite 8. After the season, Oguchi opted to transfer to Illinois State University to play for the Illinois State Redbirds. Due to NCAA transfer rules, he redshirted during the 2007–2008 season.

As a senior, Oguchi averaged 15.2 points per game and 5.4 rebounds per game, leading the Redbirds to the 2nd round of the NCAA National Invitational Tournament. He was named the 2007–2008 Missouri Valley Conference Newcomer of the Year in addition to receiving MVC All-Conference and MVC Tournament honors. He made a team best 90 3-pointers on the season, which ranks 3rd all-time in Illinois State Men's Basketball history for most 3-point field goals made in a single season while also connecting on 39.5 percent of his 3-point attempts.

== Professional career ==
After going undrafted in 2009, Oguchi began his professional career with STB Le Havre of the French Pro-A League. He was 1 of 4 players selected to compete in the LNB All-Star Game 3-point Contest.

In 2010, Oguchi played in the NBA D-League after being selected in the 2nd round (30th pick) by the Maine Red Claws.

In 2011, Oguchi was acquired by the Meralco Bolts of the Philippine Basketball Association (PBA). With the Meralco Bolts, he became a well known import because of his efficiency in mid-range shots coupled with his 3-point shooting accuracy from very far distances. In his first stint with the Bolts, Oguchi was the top scorer in the 2011 PBA Commissioner's Cup behind his 30.7 points per game. He averaged 28.3 points per game for his 11-game PBA career and made 40.3 percent of his 3-point attempts.

In September 2011, Oguchi signed to play in the Lebanese League for Hoops Club of Beirut. Following his stint in Lebanon, he would go on to play in the West Asian League (with the Iraqi club Duhok).

Oguchi finished the 2011–2012 season in the Venezuelan League for Las Panteras de Miranda. On March 1, 2012, he broke the LPB national record for most points scored in a single quarter (28 points). He finished the game with 43 points. He was later named to the LPB All-Star Team.

In May 2012, Oguchi re-signed with the Meralco Bolts, however during the 2012 Summer Olympics he drew interest from a number of NBA teams including the 2012 NBA Champion Miami Heat.

On November 1, 2012, Oguchi re-signed with the NBA D-League team Maine Red Claws.

In January 2013, Oguchi was acquired by Russian club Spartak Primorye of the Russian Professional Basketball League.

On May 13, 2013, he signed with the Spanish League club Gran Canaria of the Liga Endesa where his team would advance to the semi-finals of the Liga ACB playoff championship before losing the series to FC Barcelona.

In July 2013, Oguchi joined the Chicago Bulls for the 2013 NBA Summer League in Las Vegas.

In August 2015, he signed with Polish club Anwil Włocławek. of the Polish Basketball League.

Since then, Oguchi has played in the LNBP of Mexico with Soles de Mexicali, the French Pro-B League with Boulazac Basket Dordogne, and the Liga Nacional de Básket of Argentina with Quimsa.

== Nigerian National Team ==
Oguchi has also been a member of the senior men's Nigerian national basketball team. He played at the 2005 FIBA Africa Championship, the 2006 FIBA World Championship, the 2009 FIBA Afrobasket Championship, the 2012 Summer Olympics, the FIBA Afrobasket 2015 Championship, and the 2016 Summer Olympics.

In Nigeria's Group A Olympic preliminary match on August 6, 2012, Oguchi set the Nigerian National Basketball Team record for most points scored in a major international competition, scoring 35 points in a 79–73 loss to France. During the 2015 FIBA Africa Championship, Oguchi led Nigeria to their first ever AfroBasket title, defeating Angola 74–65. Oguchi led the team in scoring, averaging 16.6 points per game while shooting 44.1% from 3pt distance. For his impressive performance throughout the tournament, he was named Most Valuable Player and Best 3-Point Shooter. Oguchi was also named, with Al-Farouq Aminu, into the All Star Five of the 2015 Afrobasket in Tunisia.

On August 1, 2016, during an exhibition match vs. USA Basketball at the Houston Toyota Center, Oguchi scored a game-high 21 points. He averaged 16 points in 2 career matchups against USA Basketball teams that featured Kobe Bryant, LeBron James, Carmelo Anthony, and Kevin Durant.

In Nigeria's Group B Olympic preliminary match on August 11, 2016, Oguchi scored a game-high 24 points, netting 7 of 12 3-point attempts in a 87–96 loss to Spain.
