= Ashraf Rabie =

Egyptian basketball player

Personal information
- Born: 16 January 1983 (age 43) Aswan, Egypt
- Listed height: 2.06 m (6 ft 9 in)

Career information
- NBA draft: 2005: undrafted
- Position: Power forward

Career history
- Al Ittihad
- 2013–2017: Gezira
- 2019: Smouha

Ashraf Rabie (born 16 January 1983) is an Egyptian basketball player for Smouha and the Egyptian national team, where he participated at the 2014 FIBA Basketball World Cup.
