= Michael Umeh =

Nigerian-American basketball player

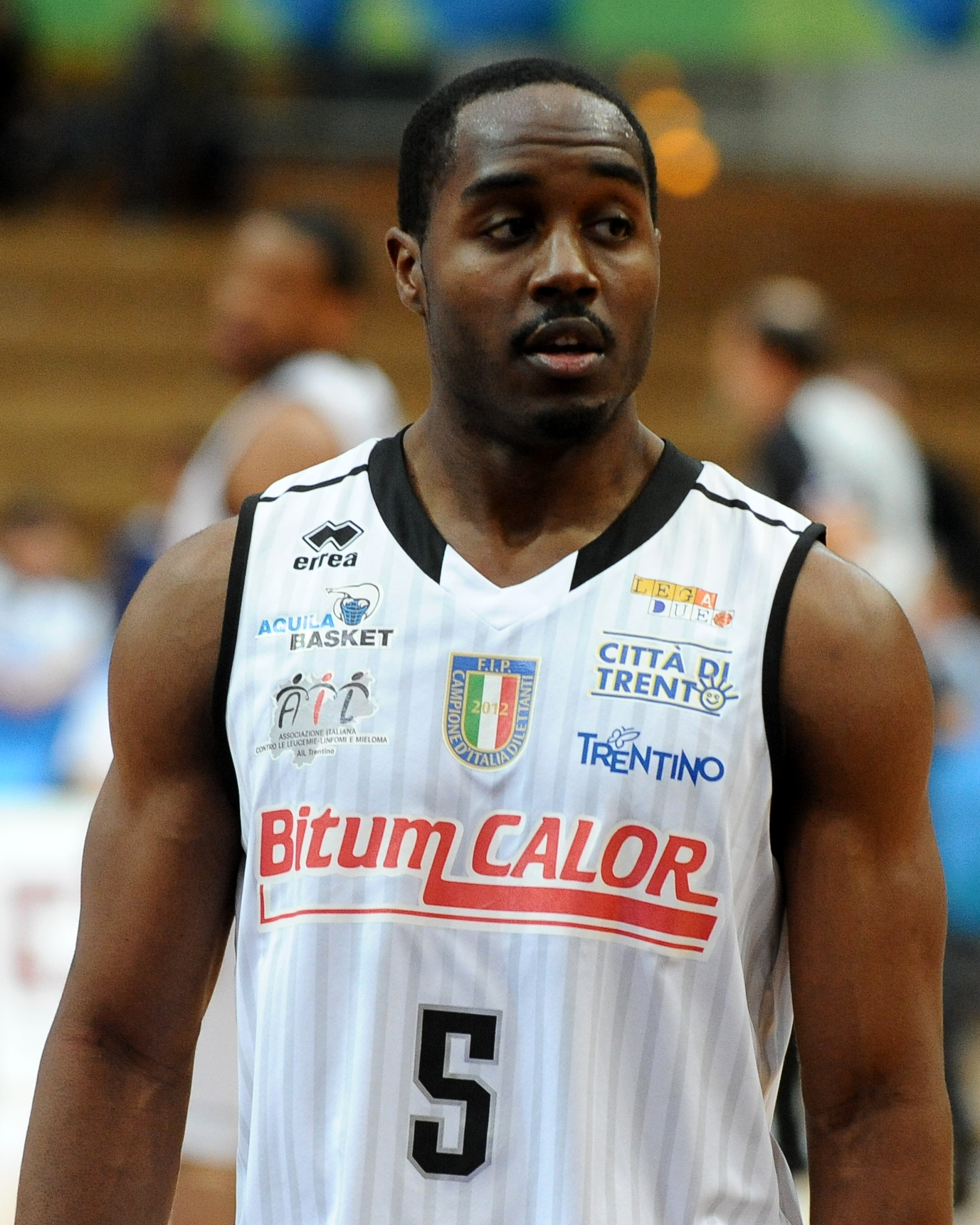
- Umeh with Trento in 2012

Free Agent
- Position: Shooting guard

Personal information
- Born: 18 September 1984 (age 42) Houston, Texas
- Listed height: 6 ft 2 in (1.88 m)
- Listed weight: 196 lb (89 kg)

Career information
- High school: Hightower (Missouri City, Texas)
- College: UNLV (2003–2007)
- NBA draft: 2007: undrafted
- Playing career: 2007–present

Career history
- 2007–2009: Gießen 46ers
- 2009–2010: Menorca
- 2010–2011: UCAM Murcia
- 2011: Valladolid
- 2011–2012: Löwen Braunschweig
- 2012–2013: Bitumcalor Trento
- 2013–2014: Bnei Herzliya
- 2014: Enel Brindisi
- 2014–2015: Tezenis Verona
- 2015–2016: Ironi Nahariya
- 2016–2018: Virtus Bologna
- 2018–2019: Polski Cukier Toruń
- 2019: Boulazac
- 2019–2020: BC Avtodor
- 2020–2021: ESSM Le Portel

Career highlights
- Italian Second League champion (2017); Israeli League All-Star (2016)
Medals
Men's basketball
Representing Nigeria
FIBA Africa Championship
Gold medal – first place	2015 Tunisia
Bronze medal – third place	2011 Madagascar

Michael Umeh (born 18 September 1984) is a Nigerian-American professional basketball player who last played for ESSM Le Portel of the French LNB Pro A. He is a dual citizen of the United States and Nigeria because both of his parents emigrated from Nigeria.

== Career ==
Umeh played high school basketball at Hightower High School in Houston. He played college basketball at the University of Nevada Las Vegas (UNLV). Umeh played professionally for the basketball team LTi Giessen 46ers. For the 2010–11 season played for CB Murcia in Spain after winning the LEB Oro play-off finals with ViveMenorca in the previous one.

With Murcia, clinched a new promotion to Liga ACB and in 2011 signed with CB Valladolid, but after some weeks, Umeh leaves the team and joins New Yorker Phantoms Braunschweig of Basketball Bundesliga.

Umeh signed with ESSM Le Portel in February 2020 and resigned with the team on May 31. On May 31, 2020, he has signed a contract extension with ESSM Le Portel for 2020–21 season.

He also plays for the Nigeria national basketball team. He represented Nigeria at the 2009 African Championship.
