= Abdullahi Kuso =

Nigerian basketball player (born 1984)

Personal information
- Born: February 17, 1984 (age 42) Kaduna, Nigeria
- Listed height: 6 ft 9 in (2.06 m)
- Listed weight: 247 lb (112 kg)

Career information
- High school: Kimi College (Kaduna, Nigeria)
- College: Tallahassee CC (2003–2006); Gonzaga (2006–2008)
- NBA draft: 2008: undrafted
- Playing career: 2008–2021
- Position: Center

Career history
- 2008–2009: BC Griffon Simferopol
- 2009–2010: Al jalaa Aleppo
- 2010: Ulsan Hyundai Mobis Phoebus
- 2010–2011: Ryukyu Golden Kings
- 2011: Rizing Fukuoka
- 2011–2012: Halifax Hurricanes
- 2012: KK Zadar
- 2012–2013: Miyazaki Shining Suns
- 2013–2014: Aomori Wat's
- 2014–2015: Iwate Big Bulls
- 2016–2017: Gunma Crane Thunders
- 2017–2018: Kagawa Five Arrows
- 2018–2020: Gunma Crane Thunders
- 2020–2021: Ibaraki Robots
Medals
Men's basketball
Representing Nigeria
African Games
Bronze medal – third place	2007 Algeria	Nigeria
Gold medal – first place	2011 several venues	Nigeria
AfroBasket
Bronze medal – third place	2011 Antananarivo	Nigeria

Abdullahi Kuso (born February 17, 1984) is a Nigerian former professional basketball player who last played for Ibaraki Robots in Japan.

== Career statistics ==
Legend
GP	Games played	GS	Games started	MPG	Minutes per game
FG%	Field goal percentage	3P%	3-point field goal percentage	FT%	Free throw percentage
RPG	Rebounds per game	APG	Assists per game	SPG	Steals per game
BPG	Blocks per game	PPG	Points per game	**Bold**	Career high

Year	Team	GP	GS	MPG	FG%	3P%	FT%	RPG	APG	SPG	BPG	PPG
2010–11	Ryukyu	26	7	17.3	.572	.000	.582	7.7	0.6	0.8	1.0	8.7
2010–11	Fukuoka	18	18	11.1	.531		.638	9.2	1.1	0.7	0.6	11.1
2012–13	Miyazaki	31	23	32.7	.458	.000	.643	12.3	2.1	0.7	1.5	17.3
2013–14	Aomori	52	49	24.1	.469	.000	.635	10.5	1.3	1.0	1.4	10.2
2014–15	Iwate	52	0	15.8	.502	---	.682	6.0	0.5	0.8	0.9	6.4
2015–16	Iwate	52	50	29.5	.501	1.000	.691	11.0	1.8	1.6	1.5	12.7
2016–17	Gunma	60	60	22.8	.514	.000	.679	8.7	1.4	0.8	1.8	13.0
2017–18	Kagawa	60	2	14.7	.472	.000	.719	5.2	1.0	0.8	1.1	7.7
