= Ramy Gunady =

Egyptian basketball player

No. 66 – Al Wehda
- Position: Point guard
- League: Saudi Basketball League

Personal information
- Born: December 20, 1981 (age 44)
- Listed height: 1.85 m (6 ft 1 in)

Ramy Gunady (born December 20, 1981) is an Egyptian basketball player currently playing for Al Wehda FC of the Saudi Basketball League. He is a member of the Egypt national basketball team.

Gunady participated with the Egypt national basketball team at the 2007 and 2009 FIBA Africa Championship. Gunady averaged 22 minutes per game off the bench for the 2009 Egypt team that finished a disappointing tenth place; this was Egypt's worst ever finish in 19 appearances at the tournament and had some fans calling for a complete dismantling of the team. He also competed for Egypt at the 2001 World Championship for Young Men and the 1999 World Championship for Junior Men.
