= Éric Tapé =

French-Ivorian basketball player

Didier Éric Tapé (born 25 October 1981) is a French–Côte d'Ivoire basketball player who currently plays with Stade Rodez Aveyron in France.

He is a longtime member of the Côte d'Ivoire national basketball team and helped the team to a surprise silver medal at the 2009 African Championship. Tape averaged 10.4 points per game in the tournament, including a team-leading 15 points in a semifinal victory against Cameroon that sent the team to its first FIBA World Championship since 1986.
