= Alexandre N'Kembe =

French-Cameroonian basketball player

Personal information
- Born: April 1, 1979 (age 47) Paris, France
- Listed height: 6 ft 4 in (1.93 m)

Career information
- NBA draft: 2001: undrafted

Career history
- 1998–2003: Bondy
- 2003–2004: Le Portel
- 2004–2005: Quimper
- 2005–2006: Nantes
- 2011–2012: Carquefou

Alexandre N'Kembe
Medal record

Men's basketball

Representing Cameroon

African Championships
| Silver medal – second place | 2007 Angola | National team |

Alexandre N'Kembe (born 1 April 1979 in Paris) is a Franco-Cameroonian basketball player. A member of the Cameroon national basketball team, N'Kembe appeared with the team at the FIBA Africa Championship 2007, where he won a silver medal.
