= South Africa men's national basketball team =

South Africa
- FIBA ranking: 110 (2 December 2025)
- Joined FIBA: 1992
- FIBA zone: FIBA Africa
- National federation: BSA
- Coach: Craig Gilchrist
- Nickname: The Proteas

AfroBasket
- Appearances: 9
| Home | Away |

South Africa national basketball team is the basketball team that represents South Africa in international competitions. The governing body of the team is Basketball South Africa.

Team South Africa is one of FIBA's youngest members, as it joined in 1992, yet it has qualified for every FIBA Africa Championship between 1997 and 2011.

Recently, South Africa has not been active at international competitions as the federation had withdrawn for several qualification competitions. The last games by the men's team were in 2017.

== Competitive record ==
=== FIBA World Cup ===
- 2019 – withdrew before games
- 2023 – withdrew before games

=== AfroBasket ===
| AfroBasket record | | | | | | Qualification record | | |
| Year | Round | Position | GP | W | L | GP | W | L |
| (Kenya) 1993 | did not qualify | | | | | | | |
| (Algeria) 1995 | did not qualify | | | | | | | |
| (Senegal) 1997 | Preliminary round | 9th | 4 | 0 | 4 | | | |
| (Angola) 1999 | Preliminary round | 12th | 6 | 0 | 6 | | | |
| (Morocco) 2001 | Preliminary round | 12th | 5 | 0 | 5 | | | |
| (Egypt) 2003 | Preliminary round | 9th | 6 | 3 | 3 | | | |
| (Algeria) 2005 | Preliminary round | 12th | 7 | 1 | 6 | | | |
| (Angola) 2007 | Classification round | 13th | 6 | 2 | 4 | | | |
| (Libya) 2009 | Classification round | 15th | 5 | 1 | 4 | 4 (Note: In 2009, South Africa qualified through a wild card.) | 3 | 1 |
| (Madagascar) 2011 | Round of 16 | 13th | 5 | 1 | 4 | 4 | 3 | 1 |
| (Ivory Coast) 2013 | did not qualify | | | | | did not enter | | |
| (Tunisia) 2015 | did not qualify | | | | | 4 | 2 | 2 |
| (Senegal) (Tunisia) 2017 | Preliminary round | 15th | 3 | 0 | 3 | 6 | 3 | 3 |
| (Rwanda) 2021 | Withdrew from qualification | | | | | Withdrew | | |
| (Angola) 2025 | Did not qualify | | | | | 2 | 1 | 1 |
| Total | | | 47 | 8 | 39 | 19 | 12 | 8 |

=== African Games ===
- 1999: 6th
- 2007: 7th
- 2011: 10th

=== Commonwealth Games ===
- 2006: 7th
- 2022: TBD

== Team ==
=== Current roster ===
Team for AfroBasket 2017:

2017 South Africa men's national basketball team roster
Players
Coaches

| Pos. | No. | Name | Age – Date of birth | Height | Club | Ctr. |
|---|---|---|---|---|---|---|
| F/C | 0 | Reece Prinsloo (C) | 26 – 16 April 1991 | 2.03 m (6 ft 8 in) | Soweto Panthers | (South Africa) |
| G | 4 | Thabo Sithole | 22 – 10 June 1995 | 1.91 m (6 ft 3 in) | Kwazulu Natal Marlins | (South Africa) |
| G | 7 | Lebesa Selepe | 26 – 13 March 1991 | 1.90 m (6 ft 3 in) | Soweto Panthers | (South Africa) |
| F | 9 | Kagiso Ngoetjana | 27 – 15 November 1989 | 1.98 m (6 ft 6 in) | Tshwane Suns | (South Africa) |
| G | 10 | Shane Marhanele | 35 – 28 August 1982 | 1.89 m (6 ft 2 in) | Limpopo Pride | (South Africa) |
| G | 11 | Sakhile Sithole | 27 – 11 March 1990 | 1.92 m (6 ft 4 in) | Mpumalanga Rhinos | (South Africa) |
| G | 12 | Neo Mothiba | 35 – 21 March 1982 | 2.01 m (6 ft 7 in) | Egoli Magic | (South Africa) |
| C | 13 | Jonathan Van der Bijl | 25 – 6 February 1992 | 2.04 m (6 ft 8 in) | Egoli Magic | (South Africa) |
| F | 14 | Tsakani Ngobeni | 33 – 16 December 1983 | 1.99 m (6 ft 6 in) | Duzi Royals | (South Africa) |
| G | 15 | Lehlogonolo Tholo | 24 – 12 November 1992 | 1.83 m (6 ft 0 in) | Egoli Magic | (South Africa) |
| C | 21 | Christopher Gabriel | 28 – 19 December 1988 | 2.11 m (6 ft 11 in) | TSU Hyundai | (Georgia (country)) |
| C | 23 | Pieter Prinsloo | 25 – 7 January 1992 | 2.08 m (6 ft 10 in) | Jass Baloncesto | (Nicaragua) |

Head coach

- (South Africa) Craig Gilchrist

Assistant coach(es)

- (South Africa) Clemen Andre Lucas Kock
- (South Africa) Sergei Eugenevich Paly

Legend

- Club – describes last
  club before the tournament
- Age – describes age
  on 8 September 2017

At the AfroBasket 2017 in Tunisia and Senegal, Lehlogonolo Tholo played most minutes and recorded most assists and steals for South Africa.

==== Depth chart ====
| Pos. | Starting 5 | Bench 1 | Bench 2 |
|---|---|---|---|
| C | Pieter Prinsloo | Christopher Gabriel | Jonathan Van der Bijl |
| PF | Reece Prinsloo | Tsakani Ngobeni |
| SF | Kagiso Ngoetjana |
| SG | Neo Mothiba | Sakhile Sithole | Shane Marhanele |
| PG | Lehlogonolo Tholo | Lebesa Selepe | Thabo Sithole |

=== Past rosters ===
FIBA Africa Championship Qualification 2015:

2015 South Africa men's national basketball team roster
Players
Coaches

| Pos. | No. | Name | Age – Date of birth | Height | Club | Ctr. |
|---|---|---|---|---|---|---|
| | | Nhlanhla Dlamini | 28 – 2 September 1986 | 1.73 m (5 ft 8 in) | | (South Africa) |
| | | Nkosianthi Festile | 21 – 15 July 1993 |
| | | Stephen Gabriel | 23 – 22 June 1991 |
| | | Celumusa Khumalo | 26 – 8 September 1988 | | | (South Africa) |
| | | Masego Loate | 32 – 19 August 1982 | 1.72 m (5 ft 8 in) |
| | | Kyle MacLean | 20 – 10 May 1994 |
| G | | Shane Marhanele | 32 – 28 August 1982 | 1.89 m (6 ft 2 in) | | (South Africa) |
| | | Motjile Jubere Matsie | 28 – 10 June 1986 |
| | | Lesego Molebatsi | 32 – 11 July 1982 | | | (South Africa) |
| | | Somusa Mthembu | 22 – 26 March 1992 |
| F | | Tsakani Ngobeni | 31 – 16 December 1983 | 1.99 m (6 ft 6 in) | | (South Africa) |
| F | | Kagiso Ngoetjana | 25 – 15 November 1989 | 1.98 m (6 ft 6 in) | | (South Africa) |
| | | Reece Prinsloo | 23 – 16 April 1991 |
| G | | Lebesa Selepe | 23 – 13 March 1991 | 1.90 m (6 ft 3 in) |
| | | McDonald Mlungisi Shongwe | 27 – 6 August 1987 |
| | | Lindokuhle Sibankulu | 33 – 9 April 1981 | 1.97 m (6 ft 6 in) | | (South Africa) |
| G | | Sakhile Sithole | 24 – 11 March 1990 | 1.92 m (6 ft 4 in) |
| | | Vusimuzi Vincent Sithole | 26 – 9 May 1988 |
| G | | Lehlogonolo Tholo | 22 – 12 November 1992 | 1.83 m (6 ft 0 in) |
| C | | Jonathan Van der Bijl | 23 – 6 February 1992 | 2.04 m (6 ft 8 in) |

Head coach

- George Makena

Assistant coach(es)

- Sinky Mphahlele
- Craig Daniels

Legend

- Club – describes last
  club before the tournament
- Age – describes age
  on 21 February 2015

FIBA Africa Championship 2011: finished 14th among 16 teams

2011 South Africa men's national basketball team roster
Players
Coaches

| Pos. | No. | Name | Age – Date of birth | Height | Club | Ctr. |
|---|---|---|---|---|---|---|
| PG | 4 | Nhlanhla Dlamini | 24 – 2 September 1986 | 1.73 m (5 ft 8 in) | A.P.N. Durban | (South Africa) |
| G | 5 | Brendan Mettler | 29 – 10 January 1982 | 1.89 m (6 ft 2 in) | Cape Peninsula University of Technology | (South Africa) |
| PG | 6 | Christopher Avenant | 20 – 25 April 1991 | 1.89 m (6 ft 2 in) | Northeastern University | (United States) |
| PG | 7 | Masego Loate | 28 – 19 August 1982 | 1.72 m (5 ft 8 in) | University of Johannesburg | (South Africa) |
| SF | 8 | Amogelang Keogatile | 23 – 10 October 1987 | 1.95 m (6 ft 5 in) | University of Johannesburg | (South Africa) |
| SF | 9 | Thabang Kgwedi | 33 – 15 April 1978 | 1.98 m (6 ft 6 in) | WildCats Johannesburg | (South Africa) |
| SG | 10 | Shane Marhanele | 28 – 28 August 1982 | 1.88 m (6 ft 2 in) | Pretoria Heat | (South Africa) |
| F | 11 | Lindokuhle Sibankulu | 30 – 9 April 1981 | 1.97 m (6 ft 6 in) | A.P.N. Durban | (South Africa) |
| SF | 12 | Neo Mothiba | 29 – 21 March 1982 | 2.00 m (6 ft 7 in) | Pretoria Heat | (South Africa) |
| C | 13 | Cedrick Kalombo | 28 – 2 June 1983 | 2.08 m (6 ft 10 in) | Ferroviario Maputo | (Mozambique) |
| C | 14 | Christopher Gabriel | 22 – 19 December 1988 | 2.14 m (7 ft 0 in) | University of San Diego | (United States) |
| SF | 15 | Kegorapetse Letsebe | 30 – 14 October 1980 | 1.98 m (6 ft 6 in) | University of Johannesburg | (South Africa) |

Head coach

- Mlungisi Ngwenya

Assistant coach(es)

- Patrick Engelbrecht

Legend

- Club – describes last
  club before the tournament
- Age – describes age
  on 17 August 2011

FIBA Africa Championship 2009: finished 15th among 16 teams

2009 South Africa men's national basketball team roster
Players
Coaches

| Pos. | No. | Name | Age – Date of birth | Height | Club | Ctr. |
|---|---|---|---|---|---|---|
| | 4 | Quintin Denyssen | 28 – 27 August 1980 | 2.00 m (6 ft 7 in) | Egoli Magic | (South Africa) |
| | 5 | Nhlanhla Dlamini | 22 – 2 September 1986 | 1.73 m (5 ft 8 in) | | (South Africa) |
| | 6 | Nyakallo Nthuping | 29 – 14 January 1980 | 1.95 m (6 ft 5 in) | Vaal University | (South Africa) |
| | 7 | Fusi Joseph Mazibuko | 29 – 3 February 1980 | 1.80 m (5 ft 11 in) | Egoli Magic | (Mozambique) |
| | 8 | Kenneth Motaung | 30 – 13 September 1978 | 1.93 m (6 ft 4 in) | Egoli Magic | (South Africa) |
| | 9 | Thabang Kgwedi | 31 – 15 April 1978 | 1.98 m (6 ft 6 in) | Vaal University | (South Africa) |
| C | 10 | Christopher Gabriel | 20 – 19 December 1988 | 2.20 m (7 ft 3 in) | University of San Diego | (United States) |
| | 11 | Lindokuhle Sibankulu | 28 – 9 April 1981 | 1.99 m (6 ft 6 in) | A.P.N. Durban | (South Africa) |
| G | 12 | Neo Mothiba | 27 – 21 March 1982 | 1.99 m (6 ft 6 in) | A.P.N. Durban | (Mozambique) |
| | 13 | Cedrick Kalombo | 26 – 2 June 1983 | 2.08 m (6 ft 10 in) |
| | 14 | Tshilidzi Nephawe | 20 – 10 June 1989 | 2.08 m (6 ft 10 in) | University of Johannesburg |
| | 15 | Kegorapetse Letsebe | 28 – 14 October 1980 | 1.98 m (6 ft 6 in) | University of Johannesburg | (South Africa) |

Head coach

- Flosh Ngwenya

Assistant coach(es)

- Thierry Kita
- Craig Gilchrist

Legend

- Club – describes last
  club before the tournament
- Age – describes age
  on 5 August 2009

FIBA Africa Championship 2007: finished 13th among 16 teams

2007 South Africa men's national basketball team roster
Players
Coaches

| Pos. | No. | Name | Age – Date of birth | Height | Club | Ctr. |
|---|---|---|---|---|---|---|
| | 4 | Quintin Denyssen | 26 – 27 August 1980 | | | (South Africa) |
| | 5 | Fusi Joseph Mazibuko | 27 – 3 February 1980 | | | (Mozambique) |
| | 6 | Nyakallo Jacob Nthuping | 27 – 14 January 1980 | | | (South Africa) |
| | 7 | Patrick Anthony Engelbrecht | 30 – 25 October 1976 |
| | 8 | Kenneth Motaung | 28 – 13 September 1978 | | | (South Africa) |
| | 9 | Thabang Kgwedi | 29 – 15 April 1978 | 1.98 m (6 ft 6 in) | | (South Africa) |
| | 10 | Buthi Lowell Naphtal Mndaweni | 31 – 2 January 1976 | | | (South Africa) |
| F | 11 | Tsakani Ngobeni | 23 – 16 December 1983 | 1.99 m (6 ft 6 in) | | (South Africa) |
| | 12 | Lesego Molebatsi | 25 – 11 July 1982 | | | (South Africa) |
| G | 13 | Neo Mothiba | 25 – 21 March 1982 | 2.01 m (6 ft 7 in) | | (Mozambique) |
| | 14 | Vusumuzi Innocent Dlamini | 32 – 16 June 1975 | | | (South Africa) |
| | 15 | Kegorapetse Letsebe | 26 – 14 October 1980 | 1.98 m (6 ft 6 in) | | (South Africa) |

Head coach

- Flosh Ngwenya

Legend

- Club – describes last
  club before the tournament
- Age – describes age
  on 17 August 2007

FIBA Africa Championship 2005: finished 12th among 12 teams

2005 South Africa men's national basketball team roster
Players
Coaches

| Pos. | No. | Name | Age – Date of birth | Height | Club | Ctr. |
|---|---|---|---|---|---|---|
| | 4 | Fusi Joseph Mazibuko | 25 – 3 February 1980 | | | (Mozambique) |
| | 5 | Quintin Denyssen | 24 – 27 August 1980 | | | (South Africa) |
| | 6 | Nyakallo Jacob Nthuping | 25 – 14 January 1980 | | | (South Africa) |
| | 7 | Patrick Anthony Engelbrecht | 28 – 25 October 1976 |
| | 8 | Johannes Arnoldus Malan | 25 – 28 February 1980 |
| | 9 | Lindokuhle Sibankulu | 24 – 9 April 1981 | 1.97 m (6 ft 6 in) | | (South Africa) |
| | 10 | Emmanuel Madonda | 24 – 7 October 1980 |
| F | 11 | Craig Gilchrist | 35 – 16 April 1970 | 2.00 m (6 ft 7 in) | | (South Africa) |
| | 12 | Lesego Molebatsi | – | | | (South Africa) |
| G | 13 | Neo Mothiba | 23 – 21 March 1982 | 2.01 m (6 ft 7 in) | | (Mozambique) |
| F | 14 | Tsakani Ngobeni | 21 – 16 December 1983 | 1.99 m (6 ft 6 in) | | (South Africa) |
| C | 15 | Christoph Jan Trauernicht | 29 – 28 July 1976 | 2.10 m (6 ft 11 in) |

Head coach

- Terry Pretoritis

Assistant coach(es)

- Ngwenya Florsheim

Legend

- Club – describes last
  club before the tournament
- Age – describes age
  on 15 August 2005

FIBA Africa Championship 2003: finished 9th among 12 teams

Coach. Sam Vincent (Mobile Revelers -USA)

- Emmanuel Madondo (180-G-80)
- Lowell Mndaweni (178-G-76)
- Joseph Mazibuko (190-G-80) Levski Sophia (BUL)
- Sifiso Ngoobo (192-G-78)
- Kenneth Motaung (195-F-78)
- Nyakallo Nthuping (200-C-80)
- Floid Mtimkulu (196-F-81)
- Craig Ngobeni Tsakani (198-F-83)
- Quinton Denyssen (203-C/F-80) Wits University Rebels
- Thuso Moiloa (199-C-78) 21882
- Thabang Kgwedi (198-F-78)
- Lesego Molebatsi (201-F/C-82)

FIBA Africa Championship 2001: finished 12th among 12 teams

- Mazibuko Joseph 192 G 80
- Uniacke David 208 C 69
- Madondo Emanuel 180 G 81
- Jesinskis Paul 200 F 81
- Molebatsi L. Prince 201 F 82
- Gilchrist Craig 200 F 70
- Trauernicht Chris 209 C 76
- Ngcobo Ndaba Sifiso 189 G 78
- Maepa Lepo 204 C 84
- Ntunja Vincent 184 G 81
- Maxima Mokoena 189 G 81
- Denyssen Quinton 203 C 80

Head Coach : Zoran Zupcevic

== Head coach position ==
- (Bosnia and Herzegovina) Zoran Zupcevic – 2001
- (United States) Sam Vincent – 2003
- Terry Pretoritis – 2005
- (South Africa) Flosh Ngwenya – 2007–11
- (South Africa) George Makena – 2014, 2015
- (United States) Craig Gilchrist – 2017

== Kit ==
=== Sponsor ===
2011: National Lottery

== See also ==
- South Africa national under-19 basketball team
- South Africa national under-17 basketball team
- South Africa women's national basketball team
- South Africa women's national under-19 basketball team
- South Africa women's national under-17 basketball team
