= Kegorapetse David Letsebe =

South African basketball player

Kegorapetse David Letsebe also known as Thabo Letsebe (born 14 October 1980) is a South African basketball player with the Soweto Panthers of South Africa's Premier Basketball League. He is also a member of the South Africa national basketball team and appeared with the club at the 2007, 2009 and 2011 African Championships. He averaged 6.3 points per game in the 2011 competition.
