= Jim Tshimpaka Kadima =

Democratic Republic of the Congo basketball player (born 1977)

Jim Tshimpaka Kadima (born 17 August 1977 in Lubumbashi) is a basketball player from the Democratic Republic of the Congo. He represented DR Congo at the 2007 FIBA Africa Championship, where he scored 34 points in 81 minutes over 4 games.

He also competed at the FIBA Africa Championship 1995 and the 2011 All-Africa Games.
