= Mayzer Alexandre =

Angolan basketball player (born 1984)

No. 9 – ASA
- Position: Small forward
- League: BIC Basket; Africa Club Champions Cup

Personal information
- Born: June 29, 1984 (age 42) Luanda, Angola
- Listed height: 184 cm (6.04 ft)

Career history
- 2004: 1º de Agosto
- 2005: ASA
- 2006–2009: 1º de Agosto
- 2010: ASA
- 2010–2013: R. do Libolo
- 2013–present: ASA
Medals
Men's basketball
Representing Angola
African Games
Gold medal – first place	Algiers 2007	National Team
FIBA Africa Under-18 Championship
Silver medal – second place	Alexandria 2002	National Team
FIBA Africa Clubs Champions Cup
Gold medal – first place	Cairo 2004	1º de Agosto
Gold medal – first place	Luanda 2007	1º de Agosto
Silver medal – second place	Lagos 2006	1º de Agosto

Mayzer Alexandre (born 29 June 1984) is an Angolan basketball player. He stands 6 ft 04 in (1.93 m) tall and plays as a small forward.

He is currently playing for ASA at the Angolan major basketball league BAI Basket.
