= Domingos Bonifácio =

Angolan basketball player (born 1984)

Personal information
- Born: 28 October 1984 (age 42) Luanda, Angola
- Listed height: 189 cm (6.20 ft)
- Listed weight: 76 kg (168 lb)
- Position: Point guard
- Number: 14

Career history
- 2002–2004: Petro de Luanda
- 2004–2006: Interclube
- 2006–2008: Petro de Luanda
- 2008–2011: Recreativo do Libolo
- 2011–2012: Primeiro de Agosto
- 2013: Recreativo do Libolo
- 2013–2019: Petro de Luanda
Medals
Men's basketball
Representing Angola
FIBA Africa Under-18 Championship
Silver medal – second place	Alexandria 2002	Angola U18
FIBA Africa Championship
Gold medal – first place	Benghazi 2009	Angola
Silver medal – second place	Antananarivo 2011	Angola
All-Africa Games
Gold medal – first place	Algiers 2007	Angola
FIBA Africa Clubs Champions Cup
Gold medal – first place	Lagos 2006	Petro Atlético
Gold medal – first place	Luanda 2015	Petro Atlético
Silver medal – second place	Luanda 2007	Petro Atlético
Silver medal – second place	Salé 2011	1º de Agosto

Domingos Emanuel da Silva Bonifácio a.k.a. Beny (born 28 October 1984) is an Angolan basketball player. At 189 cm and 76 kg (168 pounds), he plays as a point guard.

He also represented the Angolan senior team at the FIBA Africa Championship 2009. He averaged 4.7 points and 1.4 assists off the bench for the Angolans, who won their seventh consecutive FIBA Africa Championship and qualified for the 2010 FIBA World Championship. Previously, he represented the Angolan junior side at the 2003 World Junior Championships and the 2004 FIBA Africa U-20 Championship.

He is currently playing for Petro Atlético at the Angolan major basketball league BAI Basket.
