= 2019 FIBA Women's AfroBasket squads =

This article displays the rosters for the teams competing at the 2019 Women's AfroBasket. Each team had to submit 12 players.

== Group A ==
=== Egypt ===
Egypt women's national basketball team roster
Players
Coaches

Pos.	No.	Name	Age – Date of birth	Height	Club	Ctr.
G	1	Reem Moussa	25 – 23 January 1994	1.67 m (5 ft 6 in)	KP Brno	(Czech Republic)
PG	4	Meral Abdelgawad	20 – 13 November 1998	1.81 m (5 ft 11 in)	Western Kentucky Lady Toppers	(United States)
PF	5	Nouralla Abdelalim	22 – 15 June 1997	1.84 m (6 ft 0 in)	Al Ahly	(Egypt)
C	6	Fatma Aly	22 – 3 February 1997	1.96 m (6 ft 5 in)	ASFAR	(Morocco)
PF	7	Nada Merssal	23 – 3 December 1995	1.82 m (6 ft 0 in)	Gezira	(Egypt)
G	8	Soraya Degheidy	24 – 16 July 1995	1.72 m (5 ft 8 in)	Al Ahly	(Egypt)
G	9	Reem Awad	26 – 28 June 1993	1.71 m (5 ft 7 in)	Smouha SC	(Egypt)
SG	10	Asrar Bakr	21 – 10 August 1998	1.80 m (5 ft 11 in)	Alexandria	(Egypt)
F	14	Menatalla Awad	27 – 10 September 1991	1.80 m (5 ft 11 in)	Alexandria	(Egypt)
PF	15	Raneem El-Gedawy	22 – 24 February 1997	1.86 m (6 ft 1 in)	Western Kentucky Lady Toppers	(United States)
F	41	Hala El-Shaarawy	26 – 18 January 1993	1.84 m (6 ft 0 in)	Al Ahly	(Egypt)
C	74	Ganna Marouf	21 – 21 March 1998	1.85 m (6 ft 1 in)	Al Ahly	(Egypt)

Head coach

- (Egypt) Ehab El-Alfy

Assistant coach(es)

- (Egypt) Tarek El-Gendy
- (Egypt) Mohamed Shebl

Legend

- Club – describes last
  club before the tournament
- Age – describes age
  on 10 August 2019

=== Ivory Coast ===
Ivory Coast women's national basketball team roster
Players
Coaches

Pos.	No.	Name	Age – Date of birth	Height	Club	Ctr.
PG	4	Safiétou Kolga	22 – 27 March 1997	1.67 m (5 ft 6 in)	CSA	(Ivory Coast)
PG	5	Hanna Amani	23 – 11 April 1996	1.66 m (5 ft 5 in)	CSA	(Ivory Coast)
G	6	Tracy Yomy	24 – 6 January 1995	1.72 m (5 ft 8 in)	Tronche Meylan	(France)
F	7	Djefarina Diawara	24 – 13 September 1994	1.80 m (5 ft 11 in)	Mbour Basket Club	(Senegal)
C	8	Minata Fofana	33 – 22 March 1986	1.92 m (6 ft 4 in)	AMI Basketball	(Ivory Coast)
PF	9	Salimata Berte	30 – 7 May 1989	1.80 m (5 ft 11 in)	Abidjan Basket Club	(Ivory Coast)
F	10	Kani Kouyaté	29 – 8 August 1990	1.77 m (5 ft 10 in)	BCSP Rezé	(France)
PF	11	Adjoua Kouakou	25 – 17 August 1993	1.84 m (6 ft 0 in)	ASFAR	(Morocco)
F	12	Iréne Bognini	22 – 5 April 1997	1.78 m (5 ft 10 in)	CSA	(Ivory Coast)
F	14	Mariama Kouyaté	31 – 16 June 1988	1.80 m (5 ft 11 in)	Abidjan Basket Club	(Ivory Coast)
C	15	Mariam Gnanou	22 – 28 May 1997	1.93 m (6 ft 4 in)	Oklahoma State Cowgirls	(United States)
PF	99	Edjime Djedjemel	30 – 29 October 1988	1.88 m (6 ft 2 in)	CSA	(Ivory Coast)

Head coach

- (Ivory Coast) Alpha Mané

Assistant coach(es)

- (Ivory Coast) Agricola Kouakou

Legend

- Club – describes last
  club before the tournament
- Age – describes age
  on 10 August 2019

=== Senegal ===
The squad was announced on 6 August 2019.

Senegal women's national basketball team roster
Players
Coaches

Pos.	No.	Name	Age – Date of birth	Height	Club	Ctr.
PF	6	Oumoul Sarr	35 – 25 January 1984	1.90 m (6 ft 3 in)	IDK Gipuzcoa	(Spain)
PG	7	Bintou Diémé	35 – 1 February 1984	1.67 m (5 ft 6 in)	Saint-Amand	(France)
PG	8	Mame Diodio Diouf	34 – 15 December 1984	1.75 m (5 ft 9 in)	CB Islas Canarias	(Spain)
G	9	Ndéye Séne	31 – 18 January 1988	1.68 m (5 ft 6 in)	DUC Dakar	(Senegal)
F	10	Astou Traoré	38 – 30 April 1981	1.82 m (6 ft 0 in)	Uni Girona CB	(Spain)
C	11	Maimouna Diarra	28 – 30 January 1991	1.98 m (6 ft 6 in)	Adelantados	(Spain)
PF	12	Mame-Marie Sy	34 – 25 March 1985	1.82 m (6 ft 0 in)	ESB Villeneuve-d'Ascq	(France)
F	14	Lala Wane	30 – 15 July 1989	1.82 m (6 ft 0 in)	USO Basket	(France)
F	24	Yacine Diop	23 – 8 October 1995	1.78 m (5 ft 10 in)	Louisville Cardinals	(United States)
C	30	Aïda Fall	32 – 10 November 1986	1.93 m (6 ft 4 in)	Hainaut	(France)
C	45	Fatou Diagne	23 – 20 January 1996	1.95 m (6 ft 5 in)	Purdue Boilermakers	(United States)
C	89	Lena Niang	22 – 20 September 1996	1.86 m (6 ft 1 in)	Temple Owls	(United States)

Head coach

- (Senegal) Cheikh Sarr

Assistant coach(es)

- (Senegal) Denisio Adjivon
- (Senegal) Kharidata Diop

Legend

- Club – describes last
  club before the tournament
- Age – describes age
  on 10 August 2019

== Group B ==
=== Cameroon ===
Cameroon women's national basketball team roster
Players
Coaches

Pos.	No.	Name	Age – Date of birth	Height	Club	Ctr.
PG	00	Alexandra Green	27 – 16 June 1992	1.67 m (5 ft 6 in)	Melbourne Boomers	(Australia)
SF	4	Paola Nyinkeu	22 – 21 July 1997	1.70 m (5 ft 7 in)	Dunkerque MB	(France)
SG	5	Solange Ebondji	32 – 6 April 1987	1.74 m (5 ft 9 in)	Abidjan BC	(Ivory Coast)
G	6	Baleta Mukoko	27 – 6 January 1992	1.64 m (5 ft 5 in)	AP Le Havre	(France)
PF	7	Amina Njonkou	31 – 6 April 1988	1.85 m (6 ft 1 in)	UB Chartres	(France)
F	8	Marie Mfoula	27 – 31 May 1992	1.88 m (6 ft 2 in)	TSV 1880 Wasserburg	(Germany)
F	12	Sandrine Ayangma	32 – 25 October 1986	1.74 m (5 ft 9 in)	Overdose Yaoundé	(Cameroon)
PF	13	Larissa Mbong	28 – 15 August 1990	1.82 m (6 ft 0 in)	FAP Basketball	(Cameroon)
C	15	Amandine Ebogo	27 – 21 April 1992	1.89 m (6 ft 2 in)	Overdose Yaoundé	(Cameroon)
C	22	Laura Dimithe	27 – 6 June 1992	1.90 m (6 ft 3 in)	UBCU Alençon	(France)
PF	23	Cintia Mbakop	22 – 1 July 1997	1.88 m (6 ft 2 in)	Roane State	(United States)
G	44	Fre Achiri	26 – 4 April 1993	1.69 m (5 ft 7 in)	FAP Basketball	(Cameroon)

Head coach

- (United States) Natosha Cummings-Price

Assistant coach(es)

- (Italy) Stefano Bizzozi
- (Cameroon) Ahmed Mbombo Njoya

Legend

- Club – describes last
  club before the tournament
- Age – describes age
  on 10 August 2019

=== Nigeria ===
The squad was announced on 9 August 2019.

Nigeria women's national basketball team roster
Players
Coaches

Pos.	No.	Name	Age – Date of birth	Height	Club	Ctr.
SG	7	Sarah Ogoke	29 – 25 June 1990	1.75 m (5 ft 9 in)	CB Vigo	(Spain)
F	9	Aisha Mohammed	33 – 21 October 1985	1.93 m (6 ft 4 in)	Bursas BSB	(Turkey)
PG	10	Promise Amukamara	26 – 22 June 1993	1.75 m (5 ft 9 in)	Charnay BB	(France)
F	11	Adaora Elonu	29 – 28 April 1990	1.85 m (6 ft 1 in)	Uni Girona CB	(Spain)
C	12	Elo Edeferioka	26 – 10 April 1993	1.90 m (6 ft 3 in)	CB Vigo	(Spain)
C	13	Evelyn Akhator	24 – 3 February 1995	1.90 m (6 ft 3 in)	CB Avenida	(Spain)
SG	16	Jasmine Nwajei	24 – 2 February 1995	1.73 m (5 ft 8 in)	First Bank BC	(Nigeria)
PF	21	Atonye Nyingifa	28 – 8 December 1990	1.83 m (6 ft 0 in)	Porta XI Ensino	(Spain)
PG	23	Ezinne Kalu	27 – 26 June 1992	1.73 m (5 ft 8 in)	Landerneau BB	(France)
C	24	Sarah Imovbioh	27 – 25 April 1992	1.85 m (6 ft 1 in)	PEAC-Pécs	(Hungary)
C	25	Victoria Macaulay	29 – 7 August 1990	1.93 m (6 ft 4 in)	Galatasaray	(Turkey)
SF	52	Ify Ibekwe	29 – 5 October 1989	1.88 m (6 ft 2 in)	Virtus Eirene Ragusa	(Italy)

Head coach

- (United States) Otis Hughley Jr.

Assistant coach(es)

- (Nigeria) Peter Ahmedu
- (Nigeria) Shola Ogunade

Legend

- Club – describes last
  club before the tournament
- Age – describes age
  on 10 August 2019

=== Tunisia ===
Tunisia women's national basketball team roster
Players
Coaches

Pos.	No.	Name	Age – Date of birth	Height	Club	Ctr.
SG	6	Marwa Shili	19 – 14 December 1999	1.75 m (5 ft 9 in)	Étoile du Sahel	(Tunisia)
SG	7	Monia Ben Mechlia	27 – 19 March 1992	1.68 m (5 ft 6 in)	Espoir Cap Bon	(Tunisia)
G	8	Maroua Baccar	25 – 12 June 1994	1.76 m (5 ft 9 in)	CS Sfaxien	(Tunisia)
PF	9	Imen Jedidi	27 – 7 April 1992	1.80 m (5 ft 11 in)	Étoile du Sahel	(Tunisia)
PG	11	Wafa Loubiri	24 – 18 June 1995	1.68 m (5 ft 6 in)	Étoile du Sahel	(Tunisia)
SF	13	Sirine Ben Gara	20 – 9 April 1999	1.83 m (6 ft 0 in)	Espoir Cap Bon	(Tunisia)
C	23	Rania Laouini	23 – 3 June 1996	1.85 m (6 ft 1 in)	Club Sportif	(Tunisia)
PF	28	Rania Houch	26 – 20 July 1993	1.82 m (6 ft 0 in)	Étoile du Sahel	(Tunisia)
G	67	Meriem Hamrouni	30 – 15 July 1989	1.75 m (5 ft 9 in)	Ezzahra Sports	(Tunisia)
PF	77	Houda Hamrouni	25 – 7 February 1994	1.86 m (6 ft 1 in)	COD Meknès	(Tunisia)
C	84	Khouloud Mefteh	28 – 5 January 1991	1.89 m (6 ft 2 in)	Kawkab Marrakech	(Morocco)
SF	89	Hela Msadek	29 – 23 November 1989	1.72 m (5 ft 8 in)	CS Sfaxien	(Tunisia)

Head coach

- (Tunisia) Moez Monastiri

Assistant coach(es)

- (Tunisia) Hassen Ben Salma

Legend

- Club – describes last
  club before the tournament
- Age – describes age
  on 10 August 2019

== Group C ==
=== Angola ===
Angola women's national basketball team roster
Players
Coaches

Pos.	No.	Name	Age – Date of birth	Height	Club	Ctr.
G	1	Italee Lucas	30 – 12 January 1989	1.75 m (5 ft 9 in)	Interclube	(Angola)
G	4	Fineza Eusébio	29 – 18 July 1990	1.64 m (5 ft 5 in)	Primeiro de Agosto	(Angola)
G	6	Felizarda Jorge	34 – 23 February 1985	1.76 m (5 ft 9 in)	Interclube	(Angola)
F	8	Rosemira Daniel	25 – 24 October 1993	1.72 m (5 ft 8 in)	Interclube	(Angola)
SG	9	Alexia Dizeko	18 – 12 March 2001	1.82 m (6 ft 0 in)	BBC Troitorrents	(Switzerland)
C	11	Luísa Tomás	36 – 24 March 1983	1.93 m (6 ft 4 in)	Primeiro de Agosto	(Angola)
SG	12	Elisabeth Mateus	26 – 30 July 1993	1.76 m (5 ft 9 in)	Primeiro de Agosto	(Angola)
PF	14	Nadir Manuel	32 – 30 November 1986	1.86 m (6 ft 1 in)	Interclube	(Angola)
C	15	Ngiendula Filipe	37 – May 20, 1982	1.80 m (5 ft 11 in)	Primeiro de Agosto	(Angola)
PG	17	Regina Pequeno	20 – February 14, 1999	1.71 m (5 ft 7 in)	Interclube	(Angola)
C	18	Avelina Peso	21 – June 15, 1998	1.87 m (6 ft 2 in)	Primeiro de Agosto	(Angola)
C	20	Cristina Matiquite	27 – 12 March 1992	1.91 m (6 ft 3 in)	Primeiro de Agosto	(Angola)

Head coach

- (Angola) Apolinário Paquete

Assistant coach(es)

- (Angola) Fernando Figueiredo
- (Angola) Hilario Filipe

Legend

- Club – describes last
  club before the tournament
- Age – describes age
  on 10 August 2019

=== DR Congo ===
The squad was announced on 8 August 2019.

DR Congo women's national basketball team roster
Players
Coaches

Pos.	No.	Name	Age – Date of birth	Height	Club	Ctr.
PF	4	Ginette Mfutila	31 – 20 April 1988	1.88 m (6 ft 2 in)	Chabab Hoceima	(Morocco)
F	5	Marlène Ngobeleza	24 – 3 May 1995	1.68 m (5 ft 6 in)	V-Club	(Democratic Republic of the Congo)
PG	6	Naura Bombolo	24 – 16 November 1994	1.68 m (5 ft 6 in)	ASB Hatari	(Democratic Republic of the Congo)
G	7	Sephora Kayolo	20 – 20 June 1999	1.80 m (5 ft 11 in)	ASB Tourbillon	(Democratic Republic of the Congo)
PG	8	Celestine Bisoga	28 – 21 October 1990	1.72 m (5 ft 8 in)	ASB Makomeno	(Democratic Republic of the Congo)
PG	9	Natacha Mambengya	27 – 28 May 1992	1.71 m (5 ft 7 in)	V-Club	(Democratic Republic of the Congo)
PF	10	Chanel Mokango	30 – 13 October 1988	1.88 m (6 ft 2 in)	Diósgyőri VTK	(Hungary)
PF	11	Betty Kalanga	32 – 1 May 1987	1.88 m (6 ft 2 in)	Hussein Dey Marines	(Algeria)
PF	12	Mireille Muganza	29 – 2 February 1990	1.85 m (6 ft 1 in)	GS Pétroliers	(Algeria)
C	13	Alliance Ndiba	19 – 25 September 1999	1.87 m (6 ft 2 in)	Daring Club	(Democratic Republic of the Congo)
C	14	Pauline Akonga	37 – 9 January 1982	1.85 m (6 ft 1 in)	Saint-Amand Basket	(France)
C	15	Bernadette Ngoyisa	36 – 26 August 1982	1.92 m (6 ft 4 in)	Roche Vendée BC	(France)

Head coach

- (Democratic Republic of the Congo) Papy Kiembe

Assistant coach(es)

- (Democratic Republic of the Congo) Manix Lolango

Legend

- Club – describes last
  club before the tournament
- Age – describes age
  on 10 August 2019

=== Mali ===
Mali women's national basketball team roster
Players
Coaches

Pos.	No.	Name	Age – Date of birth	Height	Club	Ctr.
F	4	Nassira Traoré	30 – 28 October 1988	1.81 m (5 ft 11 in)	US Colomiers	(France)
PG	5	Aissata Maiga	27 – 21 March 1992	1.68 m (5 ft 6 in)	AS Police	(Mali)
C	6	Rokia Doumbia	20 – 5 May 1999	1.75 m (5 ft 9 in)	Arkansas Razorbacks	(United States)
PF	8	Touty Gandega	28 – 20 June 1991	1.75 m (5 ft 9 in)	Angers Basket 49	(France)
F	11	Kadidia Maiga	22 – 6 April 1997	1.85 m (6 ft 1 in)	DUC Dakar	(Senegal)
PF	12	Adama Coulibaly	21 – 25 January 1998	1.85 m (6 ft 1 in)	Saint-Louis Basket	(Belgium)
F	13	Meiya Tireira	33 – 15 April 1986	1.87 m (6 ft 2 in)	Valencia Basket	(Spain)
C	15	Mariam Coulibaly	21 – 7 October 1997	1.92 m (6 ft 4 in)	Landerneau Bretagne Basket	(France)
F	19	Goundo Diallo	22 – 19 May 1997	1.76 m (5 ft 9 in)	Sainte Savine Basket	(France)
SF	24	Kouta Camara	24 – 8 June 1995	1.76 m (5 ft 9 in)	ASA Sceaux	(France)
C	32	Assétou Diakité	21 – 15 February 1998	1.93 m (6 ft 4 in)	Stade Malien	(Mali)
G	64	Djeneba N'Diaye	22 – 8 July 1997	1.72 m (5 ft 8 in)	AMI Basketball	(Morocco)

Head coach

- (Mali) Sylvain Lautie

Assistant coach(es)

- (Mali) Amara Traoré

Legend

- Club – describes last
  club before the tournament
- Age – describes age
  on 10 August 2019

== Group D ==
=== Cape Verde ===
Cape Verde women's national basketball team roster
Players
Coaches

Pos.	No.	Name	Age – Date of birth	Height	Club	Ctr.
PF	4	Jade Leitão	36 – 13 July 1983	1.79 m (5 ft 10 in)
SG	5	Indira Evora	24 – 28 October 1994	1.74 m (5 ft 9 in)
F	6	Analeesia Fernandes	19 – 12 December 1999	1.78 m (5 ft 10 in)	Rhode Island College	(United States)
C	7	Joseana Vaz	19 – 2 March 2000	1.85 m (6 ft 1 in)	Gdessa Barreiro	(Portugal)
PF	8	Alzira Martins	21 – 4 January 1998	1.83 m (6 ft 0 in)	Boavista	(Cape Verde)
PG	9	Monalisa Mendes	25 – 29 July 1994	1.72 m (5 ft 8 in)
PG	10	Alexia Barros	24 – 27 October 1994	1.72 m (5 ft 8 in)
SG	11	Juvelina Bento	30 – 27 October 1988	1.75 m (5 ft 9 in)	Lady Rebels	(Cape Verde)
F	12	Lorreta Rocha	27 – 10 January 1992	1.79 m (5 ft 10 in)
F	13	Aylin Pires	30 – 8 June 1989	1.79 m (5 ft 10 in)	Lady Rebels	(Cape Verde)
PF	14	Ornela Livramento	29 – 15 April 1990	1.80 m (5 ft 11 in)	Rhode Island College	(United States)
C	15	Maria Correta	27 – 24 May 1992	1.84 m (6 ft 0 in)	Lady Rebels	(Cape Verde)

Head coach

- (Cape Verde) Antonio Moreira

Assistant coach(es)

- (Cape Verde) Edmar Gomes
- (Cape Verde) Marie Costa

Legend

- Club – describes last
  club before the tournament
- Age – describes age
  on 10 August 2019

=== Kenya ===
Kenya women's national basketball team roster
Players
Coaches

Pos.	No.	Name	Age – Date of birth	Height	Club	Ctr.
PG	6	Deborah Obunga	29 – 25 February 1990	1.70 m (5 ft 7 in)	Kenya Ports Authority	(Kenya)
PG	7	Betty Mjomba	33 – 30 August 1985	1.73 m (5 ft 8 in)	Equity Bank	(Kenya)
SG	8	Hilda Indasi	34 – 18 May 1985	1.73 m (5 ft 8 in)	Kenya Ports Authority	(Kenya)
SF	9	Ann Rose Atieno	29 – 4 July 1990	1.75 m (5 ft 9 in)	Equity Bank	(Kenya)
G	10	Georgia Otieno	27 – 12 June 1992	1.70 m (5 ft 7 in)	A1 Challenge	(Kenya)
SF	11	Betty Kananu	27 – 4 July 1992	1.75 m (5 ft 9 in)	Equity Bank	(Kenya)
C	12	Belinda Okoth	32 – 21 May 1987	1.85 m (6 ft 1 in)	Equity Bank	(Kenya)
C	13	Mercy Wanyama	27 – 14 January 1992	1.85 m (6 ft 1 in)	Nmobiliaria	(Kenya)
C	14	Vilma Owino	25 – 18 August 1993	1.90 m (6 ft 3 in)	Kenya Ports Authority	(Kenya)
PF	15	Silalei Shani	32 – 14 December 1986	1.85 m (6 ft 1 in)	Eagle Wings	(Kenya)

Head coach

- (Kenya) Ronnie Owino

Legend

- Club – describes last
  club before the tournament
- Age – describes age
  on 10 August 2019

=== Mozambique ===
Mozambique women's national basketball team roster
Players
Coaches

Pos.	No.	Name	Age – Date of birth	Height	Club	Ctr.
PG	4	Denise Ernesto	24 – 22 August 1994	1.72 m (5 ft 8 in)	CD Costa do Sol	(Mozambique)
PG	5	Delma Zita	21 – 27 March 1998	1.72 m (5 ft 8 in)	Clube Ferroviário	(Mozambique)
F	6	Ingvild Mucauro	26 – 12 September 1992	1.74 m (5 ft 9 in)	Clube Ferroviário	(Mozambique)
SG	7	Anabela Cossa	33 – 7 April 1986	1.72 m (5 ft 8 in)	Clube Ferroviário	(Mozambique)
PG	10	Amelia Macamo	33 – 23 September 1985	1.72 m (5 ft 8 in)	Clube Ferroviário	(Mozambique)
C	11	Leia Dongue	28 – 24 May 1991	1.88 m (6 ft 2 in)	Uni Girona CB	(Spain)
F	12	Eleuteria Lhavanguane	21 – 12 November 1997	1.80 m (5 ft 11 in)	Clube Ferroviário	(Mozambique)
F	13	Elizabeth Pereira	27 – 8 November 1991	1.70 m (5 ft 7 in)	CD Costa do Sol	(Mozambique)
PF	14	Odélia Mafanela	30 – 14 April 1989	1.81 m (5 ft 11 in)	Clube Ferroviário	(Mozambique)
C	15	Deolinda Gimo	31 – 15 August 1987	1.90 m (6 ft 3 in)	Clube Ferroviário	(Mozambique)
C	16	Tamara Seda	25 – 18 June 1994	1.92 m (6 ft 4 in)	Araski AES	(Spain)
C	18	Nilza Chiziane	27 – 27 February 1992	1.88 m (6 ft 2 in)	Clube d'A'Politecnica	(Mozambique)

Head coach

- (Spain) Julián Martínez

Assistant coach(es)

- (Mozambique) Deolinda Ngulela

Legend

- Club – describes last
  club before the tournament
- Age – describes age
  on 10 August 2019
