= 2021 FIBA Women's AfroBasket squads =

This article displays the rosters for the teams competing at the 2021 Women's AfroBasket. Each team has to submit 12 players.

Age and club as of 18 September 2021.

== Group A ==
=== Cameroon ===
A 15-player roster was announced on 10 August 2021. The final squad was revealed on 15 September 2021.

Cameroon women's national basketball team roster
Players
Coaches

Pos.	No.	Name	Age – Date of birth	Height	Club	Ctr.
PG	0	Alexandra Green	29 – 16 June 1992	1.67 m (5 ft 6 in)	FAP Basketball	(Ivory Coast)
G	6	Sema Ekha	18 – 18 June 2003	1.74 m (5 ft 9 in)	Overdose Basket	(Ivory Coast)
	7	Victorine Ndoli	26 – 22 June 1995
F	9	Ramses Lonlack	32 – 20 January 1989	1.75 m (5 ft 9 in)	CRC Quinta dos Lombos	(Portugal)
SG	10	Merveille Nkoyock	20 – 1 February 2001	1.74 m (5 ft 9 in)	FAP Basketball	(Ivory Coast)
F	12	Dulcy Fankam	22 – 26 July 1999	1.93 m (6 ft 4 in)	South Florida Bulls	(United States)
F	13	Marguerite Effa	24 – 18 January 1997	1.91 m (6 ft 3 in)	Askatuak SBT	(Spain)
F	14	Marina Ewodo	23 – 24 June 1998	1.85 m (6 ft 1 in)	Saint-Amand Hainaut Basket	(France)
C	21	Hermine Guotué	29 – 11 July 1992	1.93 m (6 ft 4 in)	Toulouse Métropole Basket	(France)
F	23	Carine Ngukuog	23 – 28 April 1998	1.86 m (6 ft 1 in)	Overdose Basket	(Ivory Coast)
SG	32	Cendra Weledji	25 – 8 March 1996	1.78 m (5 ft 10 in)	CP Miralvalle	(Spain)
PG	66	Josiane Tcheumeleu	23 – 6 June 1998	1.68 m (5 ft 6 in)	FAP Basketball	(Ivory Coast)

Head coach

- (Cameroon) Ahmed Mbombo

Assistant coach(es)

- (Cameroon) Laurent Baleba
- (Italy) Stefano Bizzozi

Legend

- Club – describes last
  club before the tournament
- Age – describes age
  on 18 September 2021

=== Cape Verde ===
The roster was announced on 16 September 2021.

Cape Verde women's national basketball team roster
Players
Coaches

Pos.	No.	Name	Age – Date of birth	Height	Club	Ctr.
SG	4	Jade Leitão	38 – 13 July 1983	1.79 m (5 ft 10 in)
SG	5	Indira Evora	26 – 28 October 1994	1.74 m (5 ft 9 in)
F	6	Analeesia Fernandes	21 – 12 December 1999	1.78 m (5 ft 10 in)	Rhode Island College	(United States)
C	7	Joseana Vaz	21 – 2 March 2000	1.85 m (6 ft 1 in)	Gdessa Barreiro	(Portugal)
SF	8	Arlia Almeida	29 – 11 December 1991	1.72 m (5 ft 8 in)
PG	9	Monalisa Mendes	27 – 29 July 1994	1.72 m (5 ft 8 in)
SF	10	Jessica Vaz	18 – 6 December 2002	1.76 m (5 ft 9 in)
SG	11	Juvelina Bento	32 – 27 October 1988	1.75 m (5 ft 9 in)	Lady Rebels	(Cape Verde)
G	12	Vandell Andrade	28 – 20 April 1993	1.79 m (5 ft 10 in)	CDB Clarinos	(Spain)
F	13	Aylin Pires	32 – 8 June 1989	1.79 m (5 ft 10 in)	Lady Rebels	(Cape Verde)
PF	14	Ornela Livramento	31 – 15 April 1990	1.80 m (5 ft 11 in)	Rhode Island College	(United States)
C	15	Maria Correia	29 – 24 May 1992	1.84 m (6 ft 0 in)	Lady Rebels	(Cape Verde)

Head coach

- (Cape Verde) Antonio Moreira

Assistant coach(es)

- (Cape Verde) Edmilson Abreu
- (Cape Verde) Maria Costa

Legend

- Club – describes last
  club before the tournament
- Age – describes age
  on 18 September 2021

=== Kenya ===
The roster was announced on 14 September 2021.

Kenya women's national basketball team roster
Players
Coaches

Pos.	No.	Name	Age – Date of birth	Height	Club	Ctr.
G	4	Jemimah Omondi	25 – 15 November 1995	1.68 m (5 ft 6 in)	Sprite Storms	(Kenya)
SG	5	Melissa Otieno	29 – 3 July 1992	1.76 m (5 ft 9 in)	Equity Bank	(Kenya)
PG	6	Natalie Mwangale	28 – 7 September 1993	1.65 m (5 ft 5 in)	Kenya Ports Authority	(Kenya)
G	7	Georgia Otieno	29 – 12 June 1992	1.70 m (5 ft 7 in)	Ubumwe BBC	(Rwanda)
PF	10	Christine Akinyi	23 – 20 October 1997	1.98 m (6 ft 6 in)	Zetech University	(United States)
SF	11	Selina Okumu	28 – 11 August 1993	1.73 m (5 ft 8 in)	Kenya Ports Authority	(Kenya)
SG	12	Rose Ouma	36 – 6 November 1984	1.78 m (5 ft 10 in)	Al-Nasr	(United Arab Emirates)
C	13	Mercy Wanyama	29 – 14 January 1992	1.85 m (6 ft 1 in)	A. D. Cortegada	(Spain)
PF	14	Vilma Owino	28 – 18 August 1993	1.90 m (6 ft 3 in)	Kenya Ports Authority	(Kenya)
PF	15	Ivy Opicho	22 – 15 July 1999	1.83 m (6 ft 0 in)	Strathmore University	(Kenya)
SF	30	Victoria Reynolds	23 – 27 November 1997	1.78 m (5 ft 10 in)	William & Mary Tribe	(United States)
PF	45	Brenda Wasuda	32 – 7 May 1989	1.83 m (6 ft 0 in)	Seattle Redhawks	(United States)

Head coach

- (Kenya) George Mayienga

Assistant coach(es)

- (Kenya) Jacob Opel

Legend

- Club – describes last
  club before the tournament
- Age – describes age
  on 18 September 2021

== Group B ==
=== Angola ===
The roster was announced on 14 September 2021.

Angola women's national basketball team roster
Players
Coaches

Pos.	No.	Name	Age – Date of birth	Height	Club	Ctr.
SG	1	Italee Lucas	32 – 12 January 1989	1.72 m (5 ft 8 in)	Interclube	(Angola)
PG	2	Rosa Gala	26 – 17 April 1995	1.73 m (5 ft 8 in)	Primeiro de Agosto	(Angola)
SF	3	Edvania Pascoal	22 – 1 July 1999	1.72 m (5 ft 8 in)	Interclube	(Angola)
F	5	Clarisse Mpaka	37 – 25 February 1984	1.77 m (5 ft 10 in)	BCSP Rezé	(France)
G	8	Rosemira Daniel	27 – 24 October 1993	1.72 m (5 ft 8 in)	Interclube	(Angola)
F	10	Ana Gonçalves	28 – 3 January 1993	1.80 m (5 ft 11 in)	Primeiro de Agosto	(Angola)
PF	14	Nadir Manuel	34 – 30 November 1986	1.86 m (6 ft 1 in)	Interclube	(Angola)
PG	17	Regina Pequeno	22 – 14 February 1999	1.71 m (5 ft 7 in)	Interclube	(Angola)
C	18	Avelina Peso	23 – 15 June 1998	1.87 m (6 ft 2 in)	Primeiro de Agosto	(Angola)
C	20	Cristina Matiquite	29 – 12 March 1992	1.91 m (6 ft 3 in)	Primeiro de Agosto	(Angola)
PF	44	Angelina Golome	33 – 23 March 1988	1.90 m (6 ft 3 in)	Interclube	(Angola)
PF	94	Whitney Miguel	29 – 30 September 1991	1.85 m (6 ft 1 in)	US La Glacerie	(France)

Head coach

- (Angola) Walter Costa

Assistant coach(es)

- (Angola) Ângela Cardoso
- (Angola) Elisa Pires

Legend

- Club – describes last
  club before the tournament
- Age – describes age
  on 18 September 2021

=== Mozambique ===
Mozambique women's national basketball team roster
Players
Coaches

Pos.	No.	Name	Age – Date of birth	Height	Club	Ctr.
SG	5	Silvia Veloso	22 – 18 October 1998	1.72 m (5 ft 8 in)	Ferroviário da Beira	(Mozambique)
F	6	Ingvild Mucauro	29 – 12 September 1992	1.76 m (5 ft 9 in)	Ferroviário da Maputo	(Mozambique)
SG	7	Anabela Cossa	35 – 7 April 1986	1.72 m (5 ft 8 in)	Ferroviário da Maputo	(Mozambique)
C	9	Dulce Mabjaia	32 – 5 November 1988	1.65 m (5 ft 5 in)	Ferroviário da Maputo	(Mozambique)
SG	10	Carla Pinto	29 – 13 August 1992	1.75 m (5 ft 9 in)	Clube de Politecnica	(Mozambique)
F	13	Elizabeth Pereira	29 – 8 November 1991	1.70 m (5 ft 7 in)	CD Costa do Sol	(Mozambique)
PF	14	Odélia Mafanela	32 – 14 April 1989	1.81 m (5 ft 11 in)	Ferroviário da Maputo	(Mozambique)
C	15	Deolinda Gimo	34 – 15 August 1987	1.90 m (6 ft 3 in)	Ferroviário da Maputo	(Mozambique)
C	16	Tamara Seda	27 – 18 June 1994	1.92 m (6 ft 4 in)	Araski AES	(Spain)
C	17	Cecilia Henriques	31 – 24 August 1990	1.83 m (6 ft 0 in)	Ferroviário da Maputo	(Mozambique)
C	20	Vilma Covane	24 – 10 October 1996	1.80 m (5 ft 11 in)	Ferroviário da Maputo	(Mozambique)
PF	23	Stefania Chiziane	24 – 26 December 1996	1.79 m (5 ft 10 in)	Ferroviário da Maputo	(Mozambique)

Head coach

- (Mozambique) Nasir Salé

Assistant coach(es)

- (Mozambique) Carlos Dezanove
- (Mozambique) Nilton Manheira

Legend

- Club – describes last
  club before the tournament
- Age – describes age
  on 18 September 2021

=== Nigeria ===
A 13-player roster was announced on 14 September 2021.

Nigeria national basketball team roster
Players
Coaches

Pos.	No.	Name	Age – Date of birth	Height	Club	Ctr.
F	0	Amy Okonkwo	25 – 26 August 1996	1.88 m (6 ft 2 in)	CD Zamarat	(Spain)
C	3	Pallas Kunaiyi-Akpannah	24 – 12 July 1997	1.88 m (6 ft 2 in)	BC Namur-Capitale	(Belgium)
SG	7	Sarah Ogoke	31 – 25 June 1990	1.75 m (5 ft 9 in)	Ferroviário de Maputo	(Mozambique)
PG	10	Promise Amukamara	28 – 22 June 1993	1.75 m (5 ft 9 in)	Charnay BB	(France)
F	11	Adaora Elonu	31 – 28 April 1990	1.85 m (6 ft 1 in)	Uni Girona CB	(Spain)
F	12	Nkem Akaraiwe	24 – 22 December 1996	1.83 m (6 ft 0 in)	CB Andratx	(Spain)
F	20	Murjanatu Musa	21 – 5 May 2000	1.87 m (6 ft 2 in)	Air Warrior Basketball Club	(Nigeria)
C	22	Oderah Chidom	26 – 9 July 1995	1.93 m (6 ft 4 in)	Angers	(France)
PG	23	Ezinne Kalu	29 – 26 June 1992	1.73 m (5 ft 8 in)	Landerneau BB	(France)
C	25	Victoria Macaulay	31 – 7 August 1990	1.93 m (6 ft 4 in)	Bursa	(Turkey)
F	33	Nicole Enabosi	24 – 26 March 1997	1.83 m (6 ft 0 in)	MBK Ružomberok	(Slovakia)
SF	52	Ify Ibekwe	31 – 5 October 1989	1.88 m (6 ft 2 in)	Nantes Rezé Basket	(France)

Head coach

- (United States) Otis Hughley Jr.

Assistant coach(es)

- (United States) Roosevelt Cochran

Legend

- Club – describes last
  club before the tournament
- Age – describes age
  on 18 September 2021

== Group C ==
=== Egypt ===
The roster was announced on 14 September 2021.

Egypt women's national basketball team roster
Players
Coaches

Pos.	No.	Name	Age – Date of birth	Height	Club	Ctr.
G	1	Reem Moussa	27 – 23 January 1994	1.67 m (5 ft 6 in)	Gezira	(Egypt)
PF	5	Nouralla Abdelalim	24 – 15 June 1997	1.84 m (6 ft 0 in)	Al Ahly	(Egypt)
F	7	Nadine Mohamed	23 – 21 January 1998	1.80 m (5 ft 11 in)	Al Ahly	(Egypt)
G	8	Soraya Degheidy	26 – 16 July 1995	1.72 m (5 ft 8 in)	Al Ahly	(Egypt)
PF	9	Nada Merssal	25 – 3 December 1995	1.82 m (6 ft 0 in)	Heliopolis	(Egypt)
F	10	Norhan Amed	25 – 21 July 1996	1.79 m (5 ft 10 in)	El Shams	(Egypt)
F	12	Farida Abdelnabi	25 – 23 July 1996	1.79 m (5 ft 10 in)	Al Ahly	(Egypt)
F	14	Hagar Amer	27 – 10 November 1993	1.84 m (6 ft 0 in)	Sporting	(Egypt)
PF	15	Raneem El-Gedawy	24 – 24 February 1997	1.86 m (6 ft 1 in)	Sporting	(Egypt)
F	34	Hala El-Shaarawy	28 – 18 January 1993	1.84 m (6 ft 0 in)	Sporting	(Egypt)
PF	50	Yousra Taha	26 – 10 March 1995	1.69 m (5 ft 7 in)	Heliopolis	(Egypt)
G	51	Reim Abdelalim	19 – 18 December 2001	1.78 m (5 ft 10 in)	Misr Insurance	(Egypt)

Head coach

- (Egypt) Ehab El-Alfy

Assistant coach(es)

- (Egypt) Amr El-Maraghy
- (Egypt) Mohamed Shebl

Legend

- Club – describes last
  club before the tournament
- Age – describes age
  on 18 September 2021

=== Guinea ===
Guinea men's national basketball team roster
Players
Coaches

Pos.	No.	Name	Age – Date of birth	Height	Club	Ctr.
PG	4	Khady Mbaye	39 – 6 November 1981	1.69 m (5 ft 7 in)	Guediawaye Basket	(Senegal)
F	5	Batouly Camara	24 – 2 November 1996	1.86 m (6 ft 1 in)	CB Bembibre	(Spain)
PG	6	Fanta Soumah	24 – 16 March 1997	1.64 m (5 ft 5 in)	Le Havre Basket	(France)
SG	7	Aicha Mara	25 – 24 January 1996	1.75 m (5 ft 9 in)	Sainte Savine Basket	(France)
PF	8	Fanta Bérété	26 – 16 April 1995	1.80 m (5 ft 11 in)	Horoya AC	(Guinea)
G	9	Fatoumata Jallow	24 – 16 April 1997	1.77 m (5 ft 10 in)	Bryant Bulldogs	(United States)
	10	Kadiatou Diawara	23 – 30 March 1998		Dieppe Basket	(France)
F	11	Mariama Touré	27 – 1 January 1994
	12	Sadan Konte	23 – 10 March 1998		ASS Sarcelles	(France)
F	13	Masseny Kaba	22 – 15 December 1998	1.89 m (6 ft 2 in)	UCF Knights	(United States)
	14	Mariama Diallo	33 – 14 November 1987		Horoya AC	(Guinea)
F	15	Fatou Bah	36 – 16 July 1985	1.88 m (6 ft 2 in)	IAM Mermoz	(Senegal)

Head coach

- (Guinea) Ousmane Camara

Assistant coach(es)

- (Guinea) Ibrahima Touré

Legend

- Club – describes last
  club before the competition
- Age – describes age
  on 18 September 2021

=== Senegal ===
The roster was announced on 8 September 2021.

Senegal women's national basketball team roster
Players
Coaches

Pos.	No.	Name	Age – Date of birth	Height	Club	Ctr.
G	4	Maty Fall	25 – 2 July 1996	1.65 m (5 ft 5 in)	ASC Ville de Dakar	(Senegal)
PF	6	Oumoul Sarr	37 – 25 January 1984	1.90 m (6 ft 3 in)	IDK Gipuzcoa	(Spain)
PG	7	Bintou Diémé	37 – 1 February 1984	1.67 m (5 ft 6 in)	CB Isla Única	(Spain)
F	8	Irma Dièmè	26 – 8 February 1995	1.73 m (5 ft 8 in)	ASC Ville de Dakar	(Senegal)
SG	9	Couna Ndao	25 – 22 April 1996	1.76 m (5 ft 9 in)	ASC Ville de Dakar	(Senegal)
C	11	Maimouna Diarra	30 – 30 January 1991	1.98 m (6 ft 6 in)	Campus Promete	(Spain)
PF	12	Mame-Marie Sy	36 – 25 March 1985	1.85 m (6 ft 1 in)	Flammes Carolo basket	(France)
F	24	Yacine Diop	25 – 8 October 1995	1.78 m (5 ft 10 in)	Charnay Basket Bourgogne	(France)
F	28	Sokhna Sylla	24 – 4 June 1997	1.88 m (6 ft 2 in)	Toyota Antelopes	(Japan)
C	35	Madjiguene Sene	26 – 25 October 1994	1.97 m (6 ft 6 in)	BF Escaudain	(France)
PF	66	Ndèye Ndiaye	28 – 10 February 1993	1.83 m (6 ft 0 in)	Roannais Basket Féminin	(France)
C	89	Lena Niang	24 – 20 September 1996	1.90 m (6 ft 3 in)	Temple Owls	(United States)

Head coach

- (Senegal) Moustapha Gaye

Assistant coach(es)

- (Senegal) Elhadji Diop
- (Senegal) Mboricka Fall

Legend

- Club – describes last
  club before the tournament
- Age – describes age
  on 18 September 2021

== Group D ==
=== Ivory Coast ===
The roster was announced on 13 September 2021.

Ivory Coast women's national basketball team roster
Players
Coaches

Pos.	No.	Name	Age – Date of birth	Height	Club	Ctr.
PG	5	Hanna Amani	25 – 11 April 1996	1.66 m (5 ft 5 in)	CSA Treichville	(Ivory Coast)
G	6	Abiba Koné	23 – 25 June 1998	1.76 m (5 ft 9 in)	CSA Treichville	(Ivory Coast)
F	7	Djefarina Diawara	27 – 13 September 1994	1.80 m (5 ft 11 in)	Porte du Hainaut	(France)
SG	8	Komba Diarrassouba	22 – 12 July 1999	1.87 m (6 ft 2 in)	National club	(Ivory Coast)
PF	9	Edwige Djedjemel	32 – 29 October 1988	1.88 m (6 ft 2 in)	CSA Treichville	(Ivory Coast)
F	10	Kani Kouyaté	31 – 8 August 1990	1.77 m (5 ft 10 in)	BCSP Rezé	(France)
SF	11	Laetitia Sahié	21 – 26 June 2000	1.89 m (6 ft 2 in)	National club	(Ivory Coast)
G	12	Zenabou Sieza	24 – 24 May 1997	1.90 m (6 ft 3 in)	SOA	(Ivory Coast)
PF	13	Amma Ouraga	21 – 6 December 1999	1.89 m (6 ft 2 in)	Friend's Basketball Association	(Ivory Coast)
F	14	Mariama Kouyaté	33 – 16 June 1988	1.80 m (5 ft 11 in)	ABC Fighters	(Ivory Coast)
PF	15	Salimata Berté	32 – 7 May 1989	1.80 m (5 ft 11 in)	ABC Fighters	(Ivory Coast)
PG	21	Mariam Konaté	21 – 21 August 2000	1.79 m (5 ft 10 in)	National club	(Ivory Coast)

Head coach

- (Serbia) Igor Kovačevič

Assistant coach(es)

- (Ivory Coast) Agricola Kouakou

Legend

- Club – describes last
  club before the tournament
- Age – describes age
  on 18 September 2021

=== Mali ===
The roster was announced on 15 September 2021.

Mali women's national basketball team roster
Players
Coaches

Pos.	No.	Name	Age – Date of birth	Height	Club	Ctr.
F	1	Kankou Coulibaly	31 – 11 April 1990	1.85 m (6 ft 1 in)	Union féminine Angers Basket 49	(France)
PF	2	Aminata Sangaré	19 – 10 February 2002	1.86 m (6 ft 1 in)	CDB Zaragoza	(Spain)
F	4	Nassira Traoré	32 – 28 October 1988	1.81 m (5 ft 11 in)	US Colomiers	(France)
C	6	Rokia Doumbia	22 – 5 May 1999	1.75 m (5 ft 9 in)	Arkansas Razorbacks	(United States)
F	7	Assetou Traoré	25 – 20 September 1995	1.80 m (5 ft 11 in)	Derklé Basket Loisirs Club	(Senegal)
F	8	Founé Sissoko	22 – 11 January 1999	1.68 m (5 ft 6 in)	Derklé Basket Loisirs Club	(Senegal)
PF	10	Maimouna Haidara	17 – 2 June 2004	1.81 m (5 ft 11 in)	CB Isla Única	(Spain)
F	11	Kadidia Maiga	24 – 6 April 1997	1.85 m (6 ft 1 in)	DUC Dakar	(Senegal)
G	12	Alima Dembélé	21 – 20 January 2000	1.86 m (6 ft 1 in)	AS Commune III	(Mali)
PF	14	Sika Koné	19 – 13 July 2002	1.90 m (6 ft 3 in)	CB Islas Canarias	(Spain)
C	15	Mariam Coulibaly	23 – 7 October 1997	1.92 m (6 ft 4 in)	IDK Euskotren	(Spain)
G	50	Djeneba N'Diaye	24 – 8 July 1997	1.72 m (5 ft 8 in)	CB Islas Canarias	(Spain)

Head coach

- (Spain) Joaquin Brizuela

Assistant coach(es)

- (Mali) Amara Traoré

Legend

- Club – describes last
  club before the tournament
- Age – describes age
  on 18 September 2021

=== Tunisia ===
The roster was announced on 15 September 2021.

Tunisia women's national basketball team roster
Players
Coaches

Pos.	No.	Name	Age – Date of birth	Height	Club	Ctr.
PF	00	Rabeb Rebai	25 – 19 April 1996	1.87 m (6 ft 2 in)	Espoir Cap Bon	(Tunisia)
SF	3	Nadia Hamzaoui	23 – 27 November 1997	1.83 m (6 ft 0 in)	Ezzahra Sports	(Tunisia)
C	4	Rabeb Abidi	20 – 10 August 2001	1.85 m (6 ft 1 in)	CS Sfaxien	(Tunisia)
SG	6	Marwa Shili	21 – 14 December 1999	1.75 m (5 ft 9 in)	Étoile du Sahel	(Tunisia)
PF	7	Houda Hamrouni	27 – 7 February 1994	1.86 m (6 ft 1 in)	Espoir Cap Bon	(Tunisia)
G	8	Maroua Baccar	27 – 12 June 1994	1.76 m (5 ft 9 in)	CS Sfaxien	(Tunisia)
PG	11	Wafa Loubiri	26 – 18 June 1995	1.68 m (5 ft 6 in)	Étoile du Sahel	(Tunisia)
PF	12	Nour Nasri	17 – 14 February 2004	1.84 m (6 ft 0 in)	Sportif de Bizerte	(Tunisia)
G	13	Meriem Hamrouni	32 – 15 July 1989	1.75 m (5 ft 9 in)	Ezzahra Sports	(Tunisia)
C	23	Rania Laouini	25 – 3 June 1996	1.85 m (6 ft 1 in)	Club Sportif	(Tunisia)
PF	32	Mariem Trabelsi	20 – 11 January 2001	1.80 m (5 ft 11 in)	CS Sfaxien	(Tunisia)
SG	93	Meriam Mallat	28 – 1 January 1993	1.78 m (5 ft 10 in)	Club Sportif	(Tunisia)

Head coach

- (Spain) Ricardo González Dávila

Assistant coach(es)

- (Tunisia) Atef Maoua

Legend

- Club – describes last
  club before the tournament
- Age – describes age
  on 18 September 2021
