= 2014 FIBA Africa Under-18 Championship for Women =

2014 FIBA U18 Women's AfroBasket
12th FIBA Under-18 Women's African Basketball Championship

Tournament details
- Host country: Egypt
- Dates: September 19–28
- Teams: 8
- Venue: 1 (in 1 host city)

Final positions
- Champions: Mali (5th title)

Tournament statistics
- MVP: (Mali) Djeneba N'Diaye
- Top scorer: (Mali) N'Diaye 17.6
- Top rebounds: (Egypt) Mohamed 13.9
- Top assists: (Algeria) Benaouda 4.9
- PPG (Team): Egypt 79.4
- RPG (Team): Egypt 56.1
- APG (Team): Egypt 16

Official website
- 2014 FIBA Africa Championship for Women U-18

The 2014 FIBA Africa Under-18 Championship for Women was the 12th FIBA Africa U18 women's championship, played under the auspices of the Fédération Internationale de Basketball, the world basketball sport governing body. The tournament was held from September 19–28 in Cairo, Egypt, contested by 8 national teams and won by Mali.

The tournament qualified the winner and the runner-up for the 2015 FIBA Under-19 World Championship for Women.

== Draw ==
Group A	Group B
Algeria; Botswana; Egypt; Tunisia	Angola; Ivory Coast; Mali; Mozambique

== Preliminary round ==
Times given below are in UTC+3.

=== Group A ===
Qualified for the semi-finals
Relegated to the 5–8 classification

Team	W	L	PF	PA	Diff	Pts.
Egypt	3	0	306	149	+157	6
Algeria	2	1	179	164	+15	5
Tunisia	1	2	174	169	+5	4
Botswana	0	3	75	252	-177	3

September 19
16:30

Boxscore

Tunisia	40–48	Algeria
Scoring by quarter: 15-18, 5-12, 9-10, 11-8
Pts: Rebai 10; Rebs: Belaid 18; Asts: Dridi 2		Pts: Kernoua 12; Rebs: Kernoua, Tlemsani 12; Asts: Benaouda 8

20:00

Boxscore

Egypt	110–26	Botswana
Scoring by quarter: 26-8, 27-11, 32-4, 25-3
Pts: Mohamed, Ramadan 15; Rebs: Mohamed 14; Asts: Nabi 5		Pts: Tlou 14; Rebs: Masebeke 8 Asts: Tlou, Seitshiro 1

September 20
14:00

Boxscore

Botswana	25–70	Tunisia
Scoring by quarter: 3-18, 7-22, 9-19, 6-11
Pts: Tlou 15; Rebs: Nkobodo 8 Asts: Moenyane 1		Pts: Rebai 13; Rebs: Belaid 13; Asts: B.Bahri 5

18:00

Boxscore

Algeria	59–100	Egypt
Scoring by quarter: 11-26, 19-22, 20-22, 9-30
Pts: Reguig 17; Rebs: Mekideche 6 Asts: Benaouda 3		Pts: Mohamed 23; Rebs: Mohamed 17; Asts: Nabi, Amr 4

September 21
16:00

Boxscore

Algeria	72–24	Botswana
Scoring by quarter: 12-8, 16-4, 28-4, 16-8
Pts: Reguig 18; Rebs: Kernoua 14; Asts: Benaouda 8		Pts: Tlou 11; Rebs: Nkobodo 13; Asts: Tlou 3

20:00

Boxscore

Egypt	96–64	Tunisia
Scoring by quarter: 32-14, 15-8, 25-28, 24-14
Pts: Mohamed 20; Rebs: Mamdouh 11; Asts: Talaat 5		Pts: Rebai 16; Rebs: Chaar 8 Asts: Dridi, Hamzaoui 2

=== Group B ===
Qualified for the semi-finals
Relegated to the 5–8 classification

Team	W	L	PF	PA	Diff	Pts.
Mali	3	0	218	103	+115	6
Mozambique	2	1	135	123	+12	5
Angola	1	2	145	156	-11	4
Ivory Coast	0	3	65	181	-116	3

September 19
11:00

Boxscore

Mali	60–30	Mozambique
Scoring by quarter: 20-4, 14-11, 12-9, 14-6
Pts: N'Diaye 18; Rebs: Coulibaly 14; Asts: N'Diaye, Maiga 3		Pts: Vilma 10; Rebs: Vilma 13; Asts: Eleutéria 3

14:30

Boxscore

Angola	47–27	Ivory Coast
Scoring by quarter: 13-8, 7-8, 12-7, 15-9
Pts: Eduarda 14; Rebs: Esperança 14; Asts: Érica 4		Pts: Amani 7 Rebs: Logbognon 10; Asts: Amani, Kolga 2

September 20
16:00

Boxscore

Ivory Coast	16–85	Mali
Scoring by quarter: 4-26, 2-13, 6-24, 4-22
Pts: Amani 8 Rebs: Diaby 10; Asts: Bognini, Coulibaly 1		Pts: Maiga 13; Rebs: Traore, Coulibaly 10; Asts: K.Keita 4

20:00

Boxscore

Mozambique	56–41	Angola
Scoring by quarter: 13-5, 9-11, 17-10, 17-15
Pts: Eleutéria 15; Rebs: Manuela 11; Asts: Neidy 3		Pts: Madalena 14; Rebs: Madalena 8 Asts: Madalena 2

September 21
14:00

[ Boxscore]

Ivory Coast	22–49	Mozambique
Scoring by quarter: 7-12, 0-8, 4-8, 11-21
Pts: Dembele 6 Rebs: Diaby 7 Asts: Amani, Kamate 1		Pts: Neidy 13; Rebs: Vilma 19; Asts: Neidy 3

18:00

Boxscore

Mali	73–57	Angola
Scoring by quarter: 24-14, 12-13, 19-11, 18-19
Pts: Coulibaly 13; Rebs: Coulibaly, Dakouo 11; Asts: Maiga 3		Pts: Érica 13; Rebs: Joana 8 Asts: Tatiana 3

== Knockout stage ==
=== 5-8th classification ===
September 23
14:00

Boxscore

Botswana	24–104	Angola
Scoring by quarter: 11-19, 0-24, 5-30, 8-31
Pts: Tlou 17; Rebs: Nkobodo 9 Asts: Ramoshebi 1		Pts: Eduarda 20; Rebs: Leopoldina 15; Asts: Madalena, Ruth 2

16:00

Boxscore

Tunisia	50–40	Ivory Coast
Scoring by quarter: 10-14, 15-7, 7-11, 18-8
Pts: Dridi 9 Rebs: Bouzid, Belaid 9 Asts: B.Bahri 2		Pts: Bognini 9 Rebs: Amani, Diaby 10; Asts: Amani 4

September 24
14:00

Boxscore

Angola	55–28	Ivory Coast
Scoring by quarter: 25-8, 12-7, 8-7, 10-6
Pts: Érica 12; Rebs: Joana 14; Asts: Madalena 2		Pts: Dembele 8 Rebs: Bognini, Diaby 4 Asts: Kolga 2

16:00

Boxscore

Tunisia	79–24	Botswana
Scoring by quarter: 9-6, 30-7, 20-4, 20-7
Pts: Kammoun 22; Rebs: Belaid 9 Asts: Kammoun, B.Bahri 4		Pts: Tlou 8 Rebs: Nkobodo 12; Asts: Tlou 2

September 26
14:00

Boxscore

Ivory Coast	63–40	Botswana
Scoring by quarter: 19-14, 12-12, 24-3, 8-11
Pts: Amani 26; Rebs: Bognini 17; Asts: Kolga 3		Pts: Tlou 13; Rebs: Nkobodo 9 Asts: Moenyane 2

16:00

Boxscore

Angola	59–61	Tunisia
Scoring by quarter: 15-17, 11-7, 17-11, 16-26
Pts: Eduarda 15; Rebs: Eduarda 13; Asts: Madalena 6		Pts: Hamzaoui 12; Rebs: Chaar 6 Asts: Kammoun, B.Bahri 4

=== Semi-finals ===
September 23
18:00

Boxscore

Egypt	68–51	Mozambique
Scoring by quarter: 15-8, 24-9, 8-18, 21-16
Pts: Talaat 16; Rebs: Talaat 19; Asts: Nabi 5		Pts: Neidy 14; Rebs: Vilma 18; Asts: Neidy 8

20:00

Boxscore

Algeria	49–67	Mali
Scoring by quarter: 16-14, 8-16, 13-23, 12-14
Pts: Tlemsani 14; Rebs: Kernoua 17; Asts: Benaouda 5		Pts: N'Diaye 21; Rebs: Coulibaly 14; Asts: four players 1

September 24
18:00

Boxscore

Egypt	67–48	Algeria
Scoring by quarter: 14-13, 15-11, 24-12, 14-12
Pts: Amr 14; Rebs: Mohamed 20; Asts: Amr 5		Pts: Rili, Tlemsani 15; Rebs: Kernoua 12; Asts: Benaouda 5

20:00

Boxscore

Mali	55–41	Mozambique
Scoring by quarter: 14-4, 9-11, 19-12, 13-14
Pts: N'Diaye 17; Rebs: Coulibaly 28; Asts: Traore 3		Pts: Stefânia 11; Rebs: Vilma 9 Asts: Neidy 3

September 26
18:00

Boxscore

Mali	60–50	Egypt
Scoring by quarter: 15-10, 21-23, 8-12, 16-5
Pts: N'Diaye 20; Rebs: A.Keita 8 Asts: N'Diaye, A.Keita 3		Pts: Mohamed 13; Rebs: Mamdouh 12; Asts: Mohamed, Nabi 3

20:00

Boxscore

Mozambique	57–37	Algeria
Scoring by quarter: 11-11, 14-12, 17-4, 15-10
Pts: four players 8 Rebs: Clitan 8 Asts: Stefânia 5		Pts: Medjahed 9 Rebs: Benaouda, Kernoua 6 Asts: Benaouda 4

=== 7th place match ===
September 27
11:30

Boxscore

Ivory Coast	114–17	Botswana
Scoring by quarter: 32-9, 22-2, 23-3, 37-3
Pts: Bognini, Amani 23; Rebs: Bognini 12; Asts: Bognini, Amani 5		Pts: Nkobodo 7 Rebs: Masebeke 9 Asts: three players 1

=== 5th place match ===
September 27
13:30

Boxscore

Tunisia	47–59	Angola
Scoring by quarter: 6-19, 12-10, 16-17, 13-13
Pts: Kammoun 14; Rebs: Dridi 9 Asts: Hamzaoui 2		Pts: Madalena 17; Rebs: Joana 19; Asts: Tatiana 2

=== Bronze medal match ===
Sep 27
15:30

Boxscore

Mozambique	51–48	Algeria
Scoring by quarter: 11-8, 19-17, 14-11, 7-12
Pts: Vânia 19; Rebs: Vânia 14; Asts: Stefânia, Neidy 4		Pts: Tlemsani 18; Rebs: Kernoua 15; Asts: Benaouda 6

=== Final ===
Sep 27
18:00

Boxscore

Mali	70–60	Egypt
Scoring by quarter: 20-11, 14-18, 17-13, 19-18
Pts: N'Diaye 25; Rebs: Coulibaly 12; Asts: N'Diaye 6		Pts: Talaat 14; Rebs: Mohamed 13; Asts: Amr 5

== Final standings ==
Qualified for the 2015 FIBA U19 World Women's Championship

Rank	Team	Record
Gold medal	Mali	7–0
Silver medal	Egypt	5–2
Bronze medal	Mozambique	4–3
4.	Algeria	2–5
5.	Angola	4–3
6.	Tunisia	4–3
7.	Ivory Coast	2–5
8.	Botswana	0–7

Mali roster
Assitan Traore, Astan Soumare, Awa Keita, Christinie Dakouo, Djeneba N'Diaye, Fanta Djire, Hawa Bagayoko, Kadidia Maiga, Kani Keita, Korotoumou Konare, Mariam Coulibaly, Mariam Maiga, Coach: Mohamed Salia

== Statistical leaders ==
=== Individual Tournament Highs ===
Points

Rank	Name	G	Pts	PPG
1	(Mali) Djeneba N'Diaye	7	123	17.6
2	(Egypt) Raneem Elgedawy	7	106	15.1
3	(Egypt) Nouralla Abdelalim	7	83	11.9
3	(Egypt) Sara Nady	7	83	11.9
5	(Botswana) Monicah Tlou	7	82	11.7
6	(Ivory Coast) Hanna Amani	7	77	11
7	(Algeria) Lylia Tlemsani	7	75	10.7
8	(Angola) Eduarda Gabriel	7	73	10.4
8	(Angola) Érica Agostinho	7	73	10.4
10	(Mozambique) Neidy Ocuane	7	71	10.1

Rebounds

Rank	Name	G	Rbs	RPG
1	(Egypt) Raneem Elgedawy	7	97	13.9
2	(Mali) Mariam Coulibaly	7	81	11.6
3	(Egypt) Fatma Aly	7	78	11.1
4	(Mozambique) Vilma Covane	7	76	10.9
5	(Angola) Joana António	6	60	10
6	(Algeria) Lynda Kernoua	6	59	9.8
7	(Botswana) Gamu Nkobodo	7	65	9.3
8	(Egypt) Nouralla Abdelalim	7	63	9
9	(Tunisia) Dalel Belaid	7	55	7.9
10	(Ivory Coast) Solange Bognini	7	54	7.7

Assists

Rank	Name	G	Ast	APG
1	(Algeria) Aicha Benaouda	7	34	4.9
2	(Egypt) Farida Abdelnabi	7	24	3.4
3	(Egypt) Nada Amr	7	23	3.3
3	(Mozambique) Neidy Ocuane	7	23	3.3
5	(Tunisia) Basma Bahri	7	17	2.4
5	(Mali) Djeneba N'Diaye	7	17	2.4
7	(Mozambique) Stefânia Chiziane	7	16	2.3
8	(Ivory Coast) Hanna Amani	7	15	2.1
9	(Egypt) Nouralla Abdelalim	7	13	1.9
10	(Angola) Madalena Silva	7	12	1.7

Steals

Rank	Name	G	Sts	SPG
1	(Ivory Coast) Hanna Amani	7	24	3.4
2	(Angola) Eduarda Gabriel	7	22	3.1
3	(Angola) Érica Guilherme	7	21	3
3	(Mozambique) Neidy Ocuane	7	21	3
5	(Angola) Emanuela Mateus	7	20	2.9
6	(Angola) Ruth Paím	7	19	2.7
7	(Algeria) Lynda Kernoua	6	16	2.7
8	(Tunisia) Basma Bahri	7	18	2.6
9	(Tunisia) Sirine Dridi	7	17	2.4
10	(Angola) Madalena Silva	7	16	2.3

Blocks

Rank	Name	G	Bks	BPG
1	(Egypt) Fatma Aly	7	10	1.4
2	(Tunisia) Jihen Chaar	7	9	1.3
3	(Mali) Mariam Coulibaly	7	7	1
3	(Botswana) Gamu Nkobodo	7	7	1
5	(Egypt) Nouralla Abdelalim	7	6	0.9
5	(Mali) Awa Keita	7	6	0.9
5	(Mali) Assitan Traore	7	6	0.9
8	(Angola) Joana Bende	4	3	0.8
9	(Mozambique) Vilma Covane	7	5	0.7
10	(Angola) Joana António	6	4	0.7

Turnovers

Rank	Name	G	Tos	TPG
1	(Botswana) Gamu Nkobodo	7	66	9.4
2	(Botswana) Monicah Tlou	7	63	9
3	(Botswana) Motshidisi Ramoshebi	7	45	6.4
4	(Botswana) Modiane Seitshiro	7	44	6.3
5	(Ivory Coast) Hanna Amani	7	32	4.6
6	(Egypt) Nada Amr	7	30	4.3
7	(Tunisia) Imen Kammoun	7	29	4.1
8	(Mozambique) Stefânia Chiziane	7	27	3.9
9	(Angola) Madalena Silva	7	25	3.6
10	(Tunisia) Basma Bahri	7	24	3.4

2-point field goal percentage

Pos	Name	A	M	%
1	(Angola) Eduarda Gabriel	49	26	53.1
2	(Egypt) Nouralla Abdelalim	48	25	52.1
3	(Mali) Mariam Coulibaly	48	24	50
4	(Mali) Djeneba N'Diaye	60	28	46.7
5	(Egypt) Raneem Elgedawy	89	41	46.1
6	(Mali) Christinie Dakouo	44	19	43.2
7	(Algeria) Lynda Kernoua	47	20	42.6
8	(Mozambique) Clitan de Sousa	48	19	39.6
9	(Ivory Coast) Solange Bognini	51	19	37.3
10	(Ivory Coast) Hanna Amani	78	28	35.9

3-point field goal percentage

Pos	Name	A	M	%
1	(Egypt) Yasmin Saleh	27	11	40.7
2	(Tunisia) Sirine Dridi	19	7	36.8
3	(Egypt) Sara Nady	41	15	36.6
4	(Mozambique) Yara Couto	14	4	28.6
5	(Tunisia) Imen Kammoun	31	8	25.8
6	(Angola) Érica Guilherme	39	10	25.6
7	(Mali) Mariam Maiga	33	8	24.2
8	(Mali) Djeneba N'Diaye	25	6	24
9	(Egypt) Nada Amr	21	5	23.8
10	(Tunisia) Ikram Jhinaoui	17	4	23.5

Free throw percentage

Pos	Name	A	M	%
1	(Egypt) Nouralla Abdelalim	23	18	78.3
2	(Algeria) Lylia Tlemsani	22	15	68.2
3	(Angola) Eduarda Gabriel	33	21	63.6
4	(Mali) Djeneba N'Diaye	45	28	62.2
5	(Tunisia) Imen Kammoun	26	16	61.5
6	(Egypt) Raneem Elgedawy	41	24	58.5
7	(Mozambique) Vânia Sengo	18	10	55.6
8	(Angola) Stefânia Chiziane	23	12	52.2
9	(Egypt) Farida Abdelnabi	29	15	51.7
10	(Tunisia) Sirine Dridi	33	17	51.5

=== Individual Game Highs ===
Department	Name	Total	Opponent
Points	(Ivory Coast) Hanna Amani (Mali) Djeneba N'Diaye	26	Botswana; Egypt
Rebounds	(Mali) Mariam Coulibaly	28	Mozambique
Assists	(Algeria) Aicha Benaouda (Mozambique) Neidy Ocuane	8	Tunisia; Egypt
Steals	(Ivory Coast) Hanna Amani	11	Botswana
Blocks	(Egypt) Fatma Aly	5	Mozambique
2-point field goal percentage	(Tunisia) Imen Kammoun	100% (6/6)	Botswana
3-point field goal percentage	(Egypt) Nouralla Abdelalim (Tunisia) Imen Kammoun	100% (3/3)	Mali; Botswana
Free throw percentage	(Angola) Eduarda Gabriel (Mali) Djeneba N'Diaye	100% (6/6)	Mali; Mozambique
Turnovers	(Botswana) Gamu Nkobodo (Botswana) Monicah Tlou	20	Ivory Coast; Angola

=== Team Tournament Highs ===
Points

Rank	Name	G	Pts	PPG
1	Egypt	7	556	79.4
2	Mali	7	473	67.6
3	Angola	7	422	60.3
4	Tunisia	7	411	58.7
5	Algeria	7	361	51.6
6	Mozambique	7	335	47.9
7	Ivory Coast	7	310	44.3
8	Botswana	7	180	25.7

Rebounds

Rank	Name	G	Rbs	RPG
1	Egypt	7	393	56.3
2	Angola	7	333	47.7
2	Tunisia	7	314	45
4	Mozambique	7	291	41.6
5	Mali	7	276	39.6
6	Ivory Coast	7	273	39.1
7	Botswana	7	252	36
8	Algeria	7	240	34.3

Assists

Rank	Name	G	Ast	APG
1	Egypt	7	112	16
2	Mali	7	74	10.9
3	Mozambique	7	69	9.9
4	Algeria	7	64	9.1
4	Tunisia	7	64	9.1
6	Angola	7	49	7
7	Ivory Coast	7	47	6.7
8	Botswana	7	26	3.7

Steals

Rank	Name	G	Sts	SPG
1	Angola	7	136	19.4
2	Tunisia	7	109	15.6
2	Ivory Coast	7	102	14.6
4	Mali	7	84	12
5	Egypt	7	78	11.1
6	Algeria	7	72	10.3
7	Mozambique	7	69	9.9
8	Botswana	7	45	6.4

Blocks

Rank	Name	G	Bks	BPG
1	Mali	7	23	3.3
2	Egypt	7	21	3
2	Tunisia	7	21	3
4	Mozambique	7	11	1.6
5	Algeria	7	10	1.4
6	Angola	7	9	1.3
6	Botswana	7	9	1.3
8	Ivory Coast	7	7	1

Turnovers

Rank	Name	G	Tos	TPG
1	Botswana	4	280	40
2	Ivory Coast	6	173	24.7
3	Egypt	7	161	23
4	Tunisia	6	158	22.6
5	Angola	6	153	21.9
6	Mozambique	6	128	18.3
7	Mali	7	126	18
8	Algeria	7	103	14.7

2-point field goal percentage

Pos	Name	A	M	%
1	Mali	276	126	45.7
2	Egypt	349	159	45.6
3	Angola	332	124	37.3
4	Tunisia	347	124	35.7
5	Mozambique	284	93	32.7
6	Ivory Coast	348	110	31.6
7	Algeria	307	94	30.6
8	Botswana	203	49	24.1

3-point field goal percentage

Pos	Name	A	M	%
1	Egypt	162	45	27.8
2	Tunisia	124	27	21.8
3	Mali	105	21	20
4	Angola	150	28	18.7
5	Mozambique	142	26	18.3
6	Algeria	113	19	16.8
7	Ivory Coast	100	16	16
8	Botswana	88	8	9.1

Free throw percentage

Pos	Name	A	M	%
1	Egypt	177	103	58.2
2	Mali	160	91	56.9
3	Angola	173	90	52
4	Algeria	129	67	51.9
5	Tunisia	188	89	47.3
6	Mozambique	151	71	47
7	Ivory Coast	94	42	44.7
8	Botswana	157	55	35

=== Team Game highs ===
Department	Name	Total	Opponent
Points	Ivory Coast	114	Botswana
Rebounds	Egypt	79	Botswana
Assists	Egypt	21	Algeria
Steals	Angola	46	Botswana
Blocks	Algeria	7	Egypt
2-point field goal percentage	Egypt	59.2% (29/49)	Tunisia
3-point field goal percentage	Tunisia	53.3% (8/15)	Botswana
Free throw percentage	Algeria	75% (12/16)	Egypt
Turnovers	Botswana	61	Ivory Coast

== Awards ==
2014 FIBA Africa Under-18 Championship for Women winner

Mali
Fifth title

Most Valuable Player
(Mali) Djeneba N'Diaye

=== All-Tournament Team ===
- G (Mozambique) Neidy Ocuane
- G (Egypt) Nada Amr
- F (Mali) Djeneba N'Diaye
- F (Egypt) Raneem Mohamed
- C (Mali) Mariam Coulibaly

== See also ==
- 2013 FIBA Africa Under-16 Championship for Women
