= 2013 FIBA Africa Under-16 Championship for Women =

2013 FIBA U16 Women's AfroBasket
3rd FIBA Under-16 Women's African Basketball Championship

Tournament details
- Host country: Mozambique
- Dates: October 5–12
- Teams: 8 (from 53 federations)
- Venue: 1 (in 1 host city)

Final positions
- Champions: Mali (3rd title)

Tournament statistics
- MVP: (Mozambique) Neidy Ocuane
- Top scorer: (Mali) N'Diaye 20.5
- Top rebounds: (Mali) Coulibaly 8.2
- Top assists: (Mali) Keita 3
- PPG (Team): Mali 84.7
- RPG (Team): Mali 34.3
- APG (Team): Egypt 14.2

Official website
- 2013 FIBA Africa U-16 Championship for Women

The 2013 FIBA Africa Under-16 Championship for Women was the 3rd FIBA Africa U16 Championship for Women, played under the rules of FIBA, the world governing body for basketball, and the FIBA Africa thereof. The tournament was hosted by Mozambique from October 5 to 12, with the games played at the Pavilhão do Maxaquene in Maputo.

Mali defeated Egypt 62–61 in the final to win their third title in a row. and securing a spot at the 2014 U-17 World Cup.

== Draw ==
Group A	Group B
Egypt; Gabon; Mozambique; Tunisia	Angola; Botswana; Ivory Coast; Mali

== Preliminary round ==
Times given below are in UTC+2.

=== Group A ===
Qualified for the quarter-finals

Team	Pts.	W	L	PF	PA	Diff
Egypt	6	3	0	246	107	+139
Mozambique	5	2	1	184	130	+54
Tunisia	4	1	2	163	162	+1
Gabon	3	0	3	46	240	-194

October 5
18:00

Boxscore

Tunisia	46–55	Mozambique
Scoring by quarter: 9-14, 13-12, 8-14, 16-15
Pts: Hamzaoui 13; Rebs: Hamzaoui 6 Asts: Hamzaoui 4		Pts: Laky 20; Rebs: Laky 11; Asts: Eleutéria 6

Pavilhão do Maxaquene, Maputo
Referees: Waleed Elmoshrfy (EGY), Suwilanji Siwila (ZAM)

October 6
18:00

[Boxscore]

Gabon	19–82	Egypt
Scoring by quarter: 2-28, 3-32, 6-11, 8-11
Pts: Akanga 6 Rebs: Angue 7 Asts: Akanga 1		Pts: Elkousy 15; Rebs: Bayoumi 10; Asts: Abdelalim 5

Pavilhão do Maxaquene, Maputo

October 7
16:00

Boxscore

Egypt	91–39	Tunisia
Scoring by quarter: 29-10, 17-6, 20-9, 25-14
Pts: Mohamed 26; Rebs: Bayoumi 6 Asts: Khalaf 4		Pts: Hamzaoui 13; Rebs: Aouinet 4 Asts: Bahri 2

Pavilhão do Maxaquene, Maputo
Referees: Natascha Wiese (RSA), Kouakou Niamien (CIV)

October 7
18:00

Boxscore

Mozambique	80–11	Gabon
Scoring by quarter: 23-0, 28-4, 15-6, 14-1
Pts: Neidy 16; Rebs: Verdiciana 9 Asts: Neidy 5		Pts: Ngouwa, Angue 4 Rebs: Boukal 6 Asts: 0

Pavilhão do Maxaquene, Maputo
Referees: Suwilanji Siwila (ZAM), Francisco Tando (ANG)

October 8
14:00

Boxscore

Tunisia	78–16	Gabon
Scoring by quarter: 19-4, 17-3, 21-3, 21-6
Pts: Hamzaoui 14; Rebs: Jhinaoui 7 Asts: Hamzaoui 5		Pts: Angue 5 Rebs: Akanga, Ngouye 5 Asts: Angue 1

Pavilhão do Maxaquene, Maputo
Referees: Suwilanji Siwila (ZAM), Francisco Tando (ANG)

October 8
18:00

Boxscore

Mozambique	vs.	Egypt
Scoring by quarter: 8-11, 17-26, 10-19, 14-17
Pts: Neidy 16; Rebs: Natália 5 Asts: Sílvia 2		Pts: Nady 14; Rebs: Aly 8 Asts: three players 3

Pavilhão do Maxaquene, Maputo
Referees: Youssouf Maiga (MLI), Kouakou Niamien (CIV)

=== Group B ===
Qualified for the quarter-finals

Team	Pts.	W	L	PF	PA	Diff
Mali	6	3	0	225	70	+155
Angola	5	2	1	142	81	+61
Ivory Coast	4	1	2	179	113	+66
Botswana	3	0	3	15	297	-282

October 5
14:00

Boxscore

Mali	116–6	Botswana
Scoring by quarter: 27-2, 18-0, 42-0, 29-4
Pts: N'Diaye 29; Rebs: Keita 6 Asts: Keita 5		Pts: Lushiam 4 Rebs: Morotsi 4 Asts: 0

Pavilhão do Maxaquene, Maputo
Referees: Waleed Elmoshrfy (EGY), Suwilanji Siwila (ZAM)

October 6
16:00

Boxscore

Angola	42–34	Ivory Coast
Scoring by quarter: 13-9, 11-8, 7-7, 11-10
Pts: Emanuela 15; Rebs: Joana 10; Asts: Emanuela 2		Pts: Bognini 19; Rebs: Bognini 9 Asts: Kolga 1

Pavilhão do Maxaquene, Maputo
Referees: Artur Castro (MOZ), Hatem Langar (TUN)

October 7
12:00

Boxscore

Botswana	7–74	Angola
Scoring by quarter: 3-23, 0-22, 0-15, 4-14
Pts: Kompase 6 Rebs: Sethlare 5 Asts: Kwenaekgakala 1		Pts: Dayane 15; Rebs: Avelina 6 Asts: Féni 4

Pavilhão do Maxaquene, Maputo
Referees: Artur de Castro (MOZ), Hatem Langar (TUN)

October 7
14:00

Boxscore

Ivory Coast	38–69	Mali
Scoring by quarter: 14-17, 7-10, 8-18, 9-24
Pts: Bognini 18; Rebs: Kolga 6 Asts: Kolga 2		Pts: N'Diaye, Coulibaly 13; Rebs: Diakite 6 Asts: Keita 4

Pavilhão do Maxaquene, Maputo
Referees: Wilfried Nziengui (GAB), Waleed Elmoshrfy (EGY)

October 8
12:00

Boxscore

Ivory Coast	107–2	Botswana
Scoring by quarter: 23-0, 34-2, 21-0, 29-0
Pts: Drame 26; Rebs: Diaby 6 Asts: three players 3		Pts: Lekoko 2 Rebs: Lekoko 5 Asts: Kebonang 1

Pavilhão do Maxaquene, Maputo
Referees: Artur de Castro (MOZ), Natascha Wiese (RSA)

October 8
16:00

Boxscore

Mali	40–26	Angola
Scoring by quarter: 14-8, 12-4, 6-3, 8-11
Pts: N'Diaye 16; Rebs: M.Coulibaly 8 Asts: N'Diaye, Keita 2		Pts: Emanuela 10; Rebs: Juda 5 Asts: Féni 3

Pavilhão do Maxaquene, Maputo
Referees: Hatem Langar (TUN), Waleed Elmoshrfy (EGY)

== Knockout stage ==
All matches were played at the: Pavilhão do Maxaquene, Maputo

Quarter-finals
10 October - 14:00
Gabon	12
Mali	138
10 October - 18:00
Ivory Coast	44
Mozambique	55
10 October - 12:00
Botswana	48
Egypt	93
10 October - 16:00
Tunisia	40
Angola	36

Semi-finals
11 October - 16:00
Mali	83
Mozambique	37
11 October - 18:00
Egypt	80
Tunisia	20

Final
12 October - 18:00
Egypt	61
Mali	62
Third place
12 October - 15:30
Tunisia	46
Mozambique	50

5th place bracket

Semi-finals
11 October - 12:00
Botswana	10
Angola	64
11 October - 14:00
Gabon	15
Ivory Coast	65

Fifth place
12 October - 13:30
Angola	50
Ivory Coast	38
Seventh place
12 October - 11:30
Botswana	21
Gabon	45

=== Quarter finals ===
October 10
12:00

Boxscore

Botswana	48–93	Egypt
Scoring by quarter: 0-27, 14-18, 12-25, 22-23
Pts: Lekoko 18; Rebs: Sethlare 8 Asts: Lushiam 2		Pts: Elgedawy 14; Rebs: Elgedawy 8 Asts: Khattab 3

Pavilhão do Maxaquene, Maputo

October 10
14:00

Boxscore

Gabon	12–138	Mali
Scoring by quarter: 0-40, 2-28, 0-37, 10-33
Pts: Abagha 5 Rebs: Akanga 6 Asts: 0		Pts: N'Diaye 23; Rebs: three players 6 Asts: Diakite, Gadiaka 4

Pavilhão do Maxaquene, Maputo

October 10
16:00

Boxscore

Tunisia	40–36	Angola
Scoring by quarter: 12-7, 12-6, 11-11, 5-12
Pts: Hamzaoui 10; Rebs: Hamzaoui 9 Asts: Hamzaoui, Guhiz 3		Pts: Neusa, Mariana 8 Rebs: Eduarda 5 Asts: three players 2

Pavilhão do Maxaquene, Maputo

October 10
18:00

Boxscore

Ivory Coast	44–55	Mozambique
Scoring by quarter: 8-17, 18-13, 6-15, 12-10
Pts: Bognini 14; Rebs: Diaby 8 Asts: five players 1		Pts: Neidy 24; Rebs: Eleutéria, Laky 8 Asts: Sílvia 4

Pavilhão do Maxaquene, Maputo

=== 5-8th classification ===
October 11
12:00

Boxscore

Botswana	10–64	Angola
Scoring by quarter: 2-16, 0-14, 0-19, 8-15
Pts: Kebonang 4 Rebs: Sethlare 8 Asts: 0		Pts: Eduarda 14; Rebs: Avelina 9 Asts: four players 2

Pavilhão do Maxaquene, Maputo

October 11
14:00

Boxscore

Gabon	15–65	Ivory Coast
Scoring by quarter: 2-12, 8-19, 0-18, 5-16
Pts: Angue 4 Rebs: Akanga 8 Asts: Abagha, Boukal 1		Pts: Bognini 24; Rebs: Bognini 10; Asts: Kolga, Gbane 4

Pavilhão do Maxaquene, Maputo

=== Semifinals ===
October 11
16:00

Boxscore

Mali	83–37	Mozambique
Scoring by quarter: 21-5, 17-16, 21-9, 24-7
Pts: N'Diaye 20; Rebs: Coulibaly 20; Asts: N'Diaye 6		Pts: Dilma 12; Rebs: Sílvia 9 Asts: Dilma, Neidy 2

Pavilhão do Maxaquene, Maputo

October 11
18:00

Boxscore

Egypt	80–20	Tunisia
Scoring by quarter: 23-4, 20-6, 22-6, 15-4
Pts: Mohamed 17; Rebs: Sherif 9 Asts: Nady 5		Pts: Bahri, Jhinaoui 4 Rebs: Abdallah 5 Asts: three players 1

Pavilhão do Maxaquene, Maputo

=== 7th place match ===
October 12
11:30

Boxscore

Botswana	21–45	Gabon
Scoring by quarter: 8-14, 8-2, 0-17, 5-12
Pts: Kompase 6 Rebs: Sethlare 10; Asts: Kompase 1		Pts: Akendengue 13; Rebs: Akanga 8 Asts: three players 3

Pavilhão do Maxaquene, Maputo

=== 5th place match ===
October 12
13:30

Boxscore

Angola	50–38	Ivory Coast
Scoring by quarter: 2-5, 16-6, 16-15, 16-12
Pts: Emanuela 9 Rebs: Joana 7 Asts: Neusa 4		Pts: Bognini 17; Rebs: Bognini 7 Asts: Kone 2

Pavilhão do Maxaquene, Maputo

=== Bronze medal match ===
October 12
15:30

Boxscore

Tunisia	46–50	Mozambique
Scoring by quarter: 9-11, 19-9, 6-12, 12-18
Pts: Jhinaoui 15; Rebs: Hamzaoui 11; Asts: Ajimi 2		Pts: Neidy 18; Rebs: Sílvia 8 Asts: Sílvia 5

Pavilhão do Maxaquene, Maputo

=== Final ===
October 12
18:00

Boxscore

Egypt	61–62	Mali
Scoring by quarter: 14-12, 13-22, 16-10, 18-18
Pts: Mohamed 22; Rebs: Aly 6 Asts: Nady 4		Pts: N'Diaye 22; Rebs: Coulibaly 12; Asts: Keita 3

Pavilhão do Maxaquene, Maputo

== Final standings ==
Qualified for the 2014 U-17 World Cup

Rank	Team	Record
Gold medal	Mali	6–0
Silver medal	Egypt	5–1
Bronze medal	Mozambique	4–2
4	Tunisia	2–4
5	Angola	4–2
6	Ivory Coast	2–4
7	Gabon	1–5
8	Botswana	0–6

Mali roster
Adama Coulibaly, Aminata Diakite, Assetou Diakite, Djeneba N'Diaye, Djenema Dembele, Kadiatou Samake, Kadidia Maiga, Kani Keita, Mariam Coulibaly, Ramata Gadiaka, Saran Traoré, Coach: Sidiya Oumarou

== Awards ==
2013 FIBA Africa Under-16 Championship for Women winners

Mali
Third title

Most Valuable Player
(Mozambique) Neidy Ocuane

=== All-Tournament Team ===
- (Mozambique) Neidy Ocuane MVP
- (Mali) Djeneba N'Diaye
- (Ivory Coast) Solange Bognini
- (Egypt) Fatma Aly
- (Mali) Mariam Coulibaly

== Statistical leaders ==
=== Individual Tournament Highs ===
Points

Rank	Name	G	Pts	PPG
1	(Mali) Djeneba N'Diaye	6	123	20.5
2	(Ivory Coast) Solange Bognini	6	111	18.5
3	(Egypt) Nadine Mohamed	6	94	15.7
4	(Mozambique) Neidy Ocuane	6	88	14.7
5	(Mali) Adama Coulibaly	6	84	14
6	(Mali) Mariam Coulibaly	6	58	9.7
6	(Tunisia) Nadia Hamzaoui	6	58	9.7
6	(Mozambique) Sílvia Veloso	6	58	9.7
9	(Mali) Aminata Diakite	6	51	8.5
10	(Ivory Coast) Mariam Kamate	6	50	8.3

Rebounds

Rank	Name	G	Rbs	RPG
1	(Mali) Mariam Coulibaly	6	49	8.2
2	(Ivory Coast) Solange Bognini	6	38	6.3
2	(Botswana) Malebogo Sethlare	6	38	6.3
4	(Mozambique) Laky Samo	6	37	6.2
5	(Gabon) Lucretia Akanga	6	33	5.5
5	(Egypt) Radwa Sherif	6	33	5.5
7	(Mozambique) Sílvia Veloso	6	32	5.3
8	(Angola) Joana António	6	31	5.2
8	(Mozambique) Verdiciana Cugeno	6	31	5.2
8	(Tunisia) Nadia Hamzaoui	6	31	5.2

Assists

Rank	Name	G	Ast	APG
1	(Egypt) Sara Nady	6	20	3.3
2	(Mali) Kani Keita	6	18	3
3	(Mozambique) Sílvia Veloso	6	16	2.7
4	(Mali) Djeneba N'Diaye	6	15	2.5
5	(Tunisia) Nadia Hamzaoui	6	13	2.2
6	(Ivory Coast) Safiétou Kolga	6	12	2
6	(Mozambique) Neidy Ocuane	6	12	2
6	(Angola) Teresa Sacato	6	12	2
9	(Egypt) Nada Bayoumi	6	11	1.8
9	(Mali) Aminata Diakite	6	11	1.8

Steals

Rank	Name	G	Sts	SPG
1	(Mozambique) Neidy Ocuane	6	41	6.8
2	(Mali) Djeneba N'Diaye	6	33	5.5
3	(Angola) Neusa Cândido	6	30	5
4	(Mali) Mariam Coulibaly	6	29	4.8
5	(Ivory Coast) Solange Bognini	6	28	4.7
6	(Mozambique) Eleutéria Lhavanguane	6	24	4
6	(Mozambique) Sílvia Veloso	6	24	4
8	(Gabon) Milame Angue	6	23	3.8
9	(Gabon) Hardell Abagha	3	21	3.7
10	(Ivory Coast) Mariam Kamate	6	21	3.5

Blocks

Rank	Name	G	Bks	BPG
1	(Mali) Kadidia Maiga	6	3	0.5
2	(Tunisia) Nadia Hamzaoui	6	2	0.3
3	(Egypt) Sara Nady	6	1	0.2
3	(Angola) Joana António	6	1	0.2
3	(Tunisia) Fatma Aouinet	6	1	0.2
3	(Mali) Assetou Diakite	6	1	0.2
3	(Tunisia) Jihene Herrouz	6	1	0.2
3	(Gabon) Lucretia Akanga	6	1	0.2
3	(Botswana) Malebogo Sethlare	6	1	0.2
10				

Turnovers

Rank	Name	G	Tos	TPG
1	(Gabon) Hardell Abagha	3	36	12
2	(Botswana) Precious Kompase	6	71	11.8
3	(Gabon) Milame Angue	6	65	10.8
4	(Gabon) Lucretia Akanga	6	55	9.2
5	(Gabon) Marel Akendengue	3	23	7.7
6	(Ivory Coast) Solange Bognini	6	41	6.8
7	(Gabon) Paolina Ngongouaya	6	40	6.7
8	(Tunisia) Basma Bahri	6	38	6.3
8	(Mozambique) Neidy Ocuane	6	38	6.3
10	(Botswana) Precious Kebonang	6	37	6.2

=== Individual Game Highs ===
Department	Name	Total	Opponent
Points	(Mali) Djeneba N'Diaye	29	Mali
Rebounds	(Mali) Mariam Coulibaly	20	Mozambique
Assists	(Mali) Djeneba N'Diaye (Mali) Eleutéria Lhavanguane	6	Mali; Mozambique
Steals	(Mali) Djeneba N'Diaye (Ivory Coast) Solange Bognini	12	Botswana; Gabon
Blocks	(Tunisia) Nadia Hamzaoui	2	Mozambique
2-point field goal percentage	(Egypt) Nadine Mohamed	100% (9/9)	Tunisia
3-point field goal percentage	(Egypt) Sara Nady	100% (4/4)	Mozambique
Free throw percentage	(Ivory Coast) Solange Bognini	100% (6/6)	Gabon
Turnovers	(Botswana) Precious Kompase	28	Mali

=== Team Tournament Highs ===
Points

Pos.	Name	PPG
1	Mali	84.7
2	Egypt	80
3	Ivory Coast	54.3
3	Mozambique	54.3
5	Angola	48.7
6	Tunisia	44.8
7	Gabon	19.7
8	Botswana	15.7

Rebounds

Pos.	Name	RPG
1	Mali	34.3
2	Mozambique	33.5
3	Angola	31
4	Egypt	30.7
5	Tunisia	30.5
6	Ivory Coast	26.2
7	Botswana	22
8	Gabon	20.5

Assists

Pos.	Name	APG
1	Egypt	14.2
2	Mali	13.2
3	Mozambique	9.2
4	Angola	8.5
5	Tunisia	7.3
6	Ivory Coast	7.2
7	Gabon	2.3
8	Botswana	1.8

Steals

Pos.	Name	SPG
1	Mali	30.5
2	Angola	27.3
3	Mozambique	25.2
4	Ivory Coast	22.8
5	Egypt	20.3
6	Gabon	16.3
7	Tunisia	15.8
8	Botswana	9.8

Blocks

Pos.	Name	BPG
1	Mali; Tunisia	0.7
1	Mali; Tunisia	0.7
3	Angola	0.2
3	Botswana	0.2
3	Egypt	0.2
3	Gabon	0.2
7		
8		

Fouls

Pos.	Name	FPG
1	Tunisia	20.5
2	Mozambique	18
3	Angola	16.2
4	Mali	15.5
5	Egypt	14.2
5	Gabon	14.2
7	Ivory Coast	13.7
8	Botswana	13.2

2-point field goal percentage

Pos.	Name	%
1	Egypt	62.5
2	Mali	61.8
3	Ivory Coast	48.6
4	Mozambique	47.1
5	Angola	46.2
6	Tunisia	46
7	Botswana	32.6
8	Gabon	29

3-point field goal percentage

Pos.	Name	%
1	Egypt	36.7
2	Mali	23.3
3	Ivory Coast	18.2
4	Angola	16.7
5	Mozambique	16.1
6	Gabon	13.8
7	Tunisia	9.5
8		

Free throw percentage

Pos.	Name	%
1	Egypt	57.5
2	Mozambique	47.4
3	Ivory Coast	46.4
4	Tunisia	44.9
5	Mali	44.2
6	Angola	43.9
7	Botswana	33.3
8	Gabon	27.2

=== Team Game highs ===
Department	Name	Total	Opponent
Points	Mali	138	Gabon
Rebounds	Mali	46	Gabon
Assists	Mali	23	Gabon
Steals	Mali	46	Gabon
Blocks	Tunisia	3	Mozambique
2-point field goal percentage	Egypt	77.8% (28/36)	Tunisia
3-point field goal percentage	Angola	66.7% (2/3)	Botswana
Free throw percentage	Tunisia	66.7% (14/21)	Gabon
Turnovers	Botswana	74	Mali

== See also ==
- 2013 FIBA Africa Championship for Women
