= Botswana women's national under-18 basketball team =

Botswana
- FIBA zone: FIBA Africa
- National federation: Botswana Basketball Association

U19 World Cup
- Appearances: None

U18 AfroBasket
- Appearances: 1 (2014)
- Medals: None

The Botswana women's national under-18 basketball team is a national basketball team of Botswana, administered by the Botswana Basketball Association (BBA). It represents the country in international under-18 women's basketball competitions.

== FIBA U18 Women's AfroBasket ==
So far, Botswana's only participation at the FIBA U18 Women's AfroBasket was in 2014, where they finished in 8th place.

== See also ==
- Botswana women's national basketball team
- Botswana women's national under-16 basketball team
- Botswana men's national under-18 basketball team
