= Botswana women's national under-16 basketball team =

National under-16 basketball team of Botswana

Botswana
- FIBA zone: FIBA Africa
- National federation: Botswana Basketball Association

U17 World Cup
- Appearances: None

U16 AfroBasket
- Appearances: 1 (2013)
- Medals: None

The Botswana women's national under-16 basketball team is a national basketball team of Botswana, administered by the Botswana Basketball Association (BBA). It represents the country in international under-16 women's basketball competitions.

== FIBA U16 Women's AfroBasket participations ==
- 2013 FIBA Africa Under-16 Championship for Women – 8th place

== See also ==
- Botswana women's national basketball team
- Botswana women's national under-18 basketball team
- Botswana men's national under-16 basketball team
