= Otis Hughley Jr. =

American basketball coach

Otis Hughley, Jr.
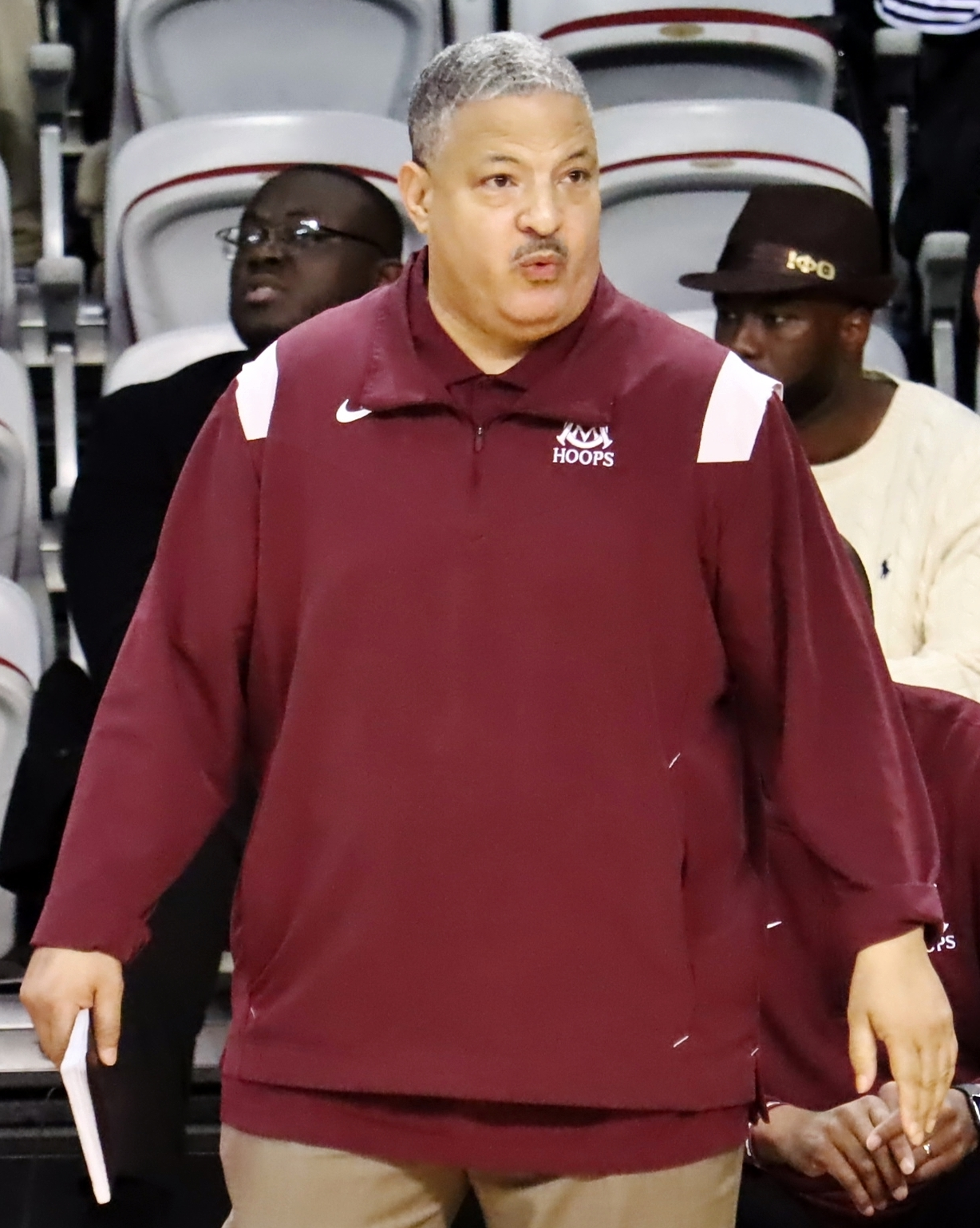
- Hughley with Alabama A&M in 2024

Biographical details
- Born: September 25, 1964 (age 62); Atlanta, Georgia, U.S.
- Education: Utah State Eastern; West Alabama '87

Coaching career (HC unless noted)
- 1993–1997: Wallace CC–Selma (men)
- 1993–1997: Wallace CC–Selma (women)
- 1997–1998: Wright State (assistant)
- 1998–1999: Liberty (assistant)
- 2001–2002: Southern (assistant)
- 2002–2003: Shandong Bulls (assistant)
- 2004–2010: LeFlore HS (AL)
- 2010–2011: Sacramento Kings (assistant)
- 2011–2012: Golden State Warriors (dev./video coach)
- 2013–2014: Taiwan Mobile Basketball Team (assistant)
- 2014: Chinese Taipei (men)
- 2014–2015: Fubon Braves
- 2015: Chinese Taipei (women)
- 2015–2016: Tianjin Gold Lions (assistant)
- 2017–2022: Nigeria (women)
- 2022–2025: Alabama A&M
- 2024–present: Senegal (women)

Head coaching record
- Overall: 37–63 (.370) (NCAA Men’s ) 135–46 (.746) (NJCAA)45–21 (.682) (NCAA Women’s ) 185–20 (.902) (High School)
- Tournaments: 1–1 (CIT)
Medal record
As coach in Women's basketball
Representing Nigeria
AfroBasket Women
Gold medal – first place	2019 FIBA Women's AfroBasket	team
Gold medal – first place	2021 FIBA Women's AfroBasket	team

Otis Hughley Jr. (born September 25, 1964) is an American basketball coach who is the head coach of the Senegal women's national basketball team. He previously served as the head coach of the Nigeria women's national basketball team, where he guided the team to two AfroBasket Women championships and the 2020 Summer Olympics.

== Early life ==
Raised in Jersey City, Hughley graduated in 1982 from Henry Snyder High School, where he played quarterback on the school's football team. He also played on the school's basketball team with future National Basketball Association player Rafael Addison.

After graduating from Snyder, he enrolled at the College of Eastern Utah where he played both college basketball and college football. He next enrolled at Livingston University (now University of West Alabama) where he played football as a starting quarterback. Upon graduating from Livingston, Snyder played professionally and helped coach football for the Varese Skorpions in Varese, Italy in the Italian Football League. He also coached a men's basketball team. He eventually returned to the United States where he worked as an administrator at Bishop State Community College.

== Coaching career ==
Hughley was named as the basketball coach at Wallace Community College Selma in 1993; he inherited a men's basketball team that finished 2–24 the prior season and was simultaneously the inaugural coach of the women's program. In his time at Wallace, he would guide the men to a 90–25 record including two conference championships, and the women to a 45–21 mark, with a number four national ranking. In 1997, Hughley would join the men's basketball staff at Wright State under Ed Schilling for a single season before spending a season as an assistant coach at Liberty. He'd spend an additional year in college coaching with Southern under Ben Jobe from 2001 to 2002, before embarking on a career in professional basketball coaching overseas where he'd be an assistant coach with the Shandong Bulls of the Chinese Basketball Association.

In 2004, Hughley would return stateside to coach the boys basketball team at LeFlore Magnet High School in Mobile, Alabama. During that time, he'd lead the team to a 185–20, while also coaching future NBA player DeMarcus Cousins. In 2010, Hughley would follow Cousins to the NBA as he became an assistant coach with the Sacramento Kings for the 2010–11 NBA season. After that lone year with the Kings, Hughley joined the Golden State Warriors in its development and video coaching department, before returning to be a scout for the Kings from 2012 to 2016.

Once again, Hughley would head abroad; in 2015, he would coach both the men and women's national teams of Chinese Taipei, while also serving as an assistant coach with the Tianjin Gold Lions in China. In 2017, following Nigeria's 2017 AfroBasket victory with Sam Vincent, Hughley would be named the head coach of the Nigeria women's national basketball team. While with D'Tigress, he'd help guide them to two more AfroBasket Women's titles in 2019, and 2021, as well as an appearance in the 2020 Olympic Games. Nigeria, along with Senegal also became the first African women's teams to win a game in the 2018 FIBA Women's Basketball World Cup, while finishing in eighth, which is the highest finish for an African side in the event.

On April 18, 2022, Hughley was named the men's basketball coach at Alabama A&M, replacing Dylan Howard.

On July 17, 2024, Hughley was named the head coach of the Senegal women's national basketball team.

== Head coaching record ==
=== College ===
==== NCAA D1 ====
Record table
Season	Team	Overall	Conference	Standing	Postseason
Alabama A&M Bulldogs (SWAC) (2022–2025)
2022–23	Alabama A&M	15–18	10–8	5th	
2023–24	Alabama A&M	12–23	9–9	7th	CIT Semifinals
2024–25	Alabama A&M	10–22	6–12	9th	
Alabama A&M:		37–63 (.370)	25–29 (.463)		
Total:		37–63 (.370)			
National champion Postseason invitational champion Conference regular season champion Conference regular season and conference tournament champion Division regular season champion Division regular season and conference tournament champion Conference tournament champion
