= Botswana women's national basketball team =

Botswana
- FIBA ranking: NR (18 March 2026)
- Joined FIBA: 1997
- FIBA zone: FIBA Africa

Olympic Games
- Appearances: None

World Cup
- Appearances: None

AfroBasket Women
- Appearances: None
Home	Away

The Botswana women's national basketball team is administered by the Botswana Basketball Association (BBA).

It participated at the AfroBasket Women 2015 qualification round.

== See also ==
- Botswana women's national under-19 basketball team
- Botswana women's national under-17 basketball team
- Botswana women's national 3x3 team
- Botswana men's national basketball team
