= AfroBasket 2015 qualification =

AfroBasket 2015 Qualification occurred on various dates between 21 September 2014 and 8 March 2015. It was used to determine which African national basketball teams would qualify for the 2015 FIBA Africa Championship. Teams competed with other teams in their respective "zones" for a spot in the Championship tournament.

== Qualified Teams ==
Four teams qualified for the tournament before the qualification round took place. Twelve more teams claimed spots in the tournament through Zonal Qualifying.

Qualified as the host nation:

- Tunisia

From qualification:

- Angola
- Cameroon
- Cape Verde
- Egypt
- Gabon
- Ivory Coast
- Mali
- Morocco
- Mozambique
- Nigeria
- Uganda
- Zimbabwe

Selected as wild cards:

- Algeria
- Central African Republic
- Senegal

== Zones ==
=== Zone 1 ===
Zone 1 was played from January 6 to February 15 2015 in Algiers, Algeria and Salé, Morocco.

Team	Pld	W	L	PF	PA	PD	Pts
Morocco	4	3	1	260	208	+52	7
Algeria	4	3	1	242	227	+15	7
Libya (Note: Libya withdrew from the competition after two matches due to the political situation in the country.)	4	0	4	119	186	−67	4

6 January 2015
16:00 (GMT +1)

Algeria	88–63	Libya
Scoring by quarter: 19–16, 25–10, 27–21, 17–16

Algiers

7 January 2015
16:00 (GMT +1)

Morocco	94–56	Libya
Scoring by quarter: 23–16, 19–11, 32–12, 20–17

Algiers

8 January 2015
16:00 (GMT +1)

Algeria	81–80	Morocco
Scoring by quarter: 26–24, 16–10, 23–30, 16–16

Algiers

13 February 2015

Morocco	2–0	Libya

Salé

14 February 2015

Algeria	2–0	Libya

Salé

15 February 2015

Morocco	84–71	Algeria
Scoring by quarter: 27–17, 18–14, 26–16, 13–24

Salé

=== Zone 2 ===
Zone 2 was played from February 12 to February 25 2015 in Bamako, Mali and Dakar, Senegal from 1 group and Praia, Cape Verde from group 2.

==== Group B ====
Team	Pld	W	L	PF	PA	PD	Pts
Mali	2	2	0	115	90	+25	4
Senegal	2	0	2	90	115	−25	2

21 February 2015
20:00 (GMT +1)

Report

Mali	65–43	Senegal
Scoring by quarter: 11–13, 16–6, 14–14, 24–10
Pts: Tangara 16; Rebs: Tangara 10; Asts: Mounkoro 7		Pts: Diop 11; Rebs: two players 5 Asts: Niang 3

Bamako
Referees: M. Kouadio Mathurin N'Guessan (CIV), M. Kaddour Hamid (ALG), M. Abassi Abdelaziz (TUN)

28 February 2015
17:00 (GMT +1)

Report

Senegal	47–50	Mali
Scoring by quarter: 9–9, 11–10, 11–19, 16–12
Pts: Diop 15; Rebs: Abdoul Ba 8 Asts: Moˇse Diame 4		Pts: Coulibaly 14; Rebs: Coulibaly 10; Asts: Coulibaly 7

Dakar
Referees: Hassane Kamate (CIV), Paulo Renato Martinho (CIV), Samir Abaakil (MAR)

==== Group C ====
Team	Pld	W	L	PF	PA	PD	Pts
Cape Verde	2	2	0	141	102	+39	4
Guinea	2	0	2	102	141	−39	2

12 February 2015
19:30 (GMT +1)

Cape Verde	71–60	Guinea
Scoring by quarter: 9–11, 21–20, 24–10, 17–19

Praia

13 February 2015
19:30 (GMT +1)

Guinea	42–70	Cape Verde
Scoring by quarter: 10–13, 9–24, 17–14, 6–19

Praia

=== Zone 3 ===
Zone 3 was played from February 7 to February 8 2015 in Cotonou, Benin.

==== Group D ====
Team	Pld	W	L	PF	PA	PD	Pts
Ivory Coast	2	2	0	131	106	+25	4
Benin	2	0	2	106	131	−25	2

7 January 2015
16:00 (GMT +1)

Benin	57–69	Ivory Coast

Cotonou

8 January 2015
16:00 (GMT +1)

Ivory Coast	62–49	Benin

Cotonou

==== Group E ====
Team	Pld	W	L	PF	PA	PD	Pts
Nigeria	2	2	0	150	114	+36	4
Burkina Faso	2	0	2	114	150	−36	2

16 March 2015
19:00 (GMT +1)

Burkina Faso	64–87	Nigeria
Scoring by quarter: 19–22, 9–24, 23–19, 13–22

Ouagadougou

25 March 2015
17:00 (GMT +1)

Nigeria	63–50	Burkina Faso
Scoring by quarter: 18–10, 14–7, 14–15, 17–18

Lagos

=== Zone 4 ===
==== Group F ====
Team	Pld	W	L	PF	PA	PD	Pts
Cameroon	2	2	0	161	137	+24	4
Congo	2	0	2	137	161	−24	2
~~DR Congo~~	0	0	0	0	0	0	0
~~Equatorial Guinea~~	0	0	0	0	0	0	0

20 February 2015
16:00 (GMT +1)

Cameroon	81–69	Congo
Scoring by quarter: 20–19, 16–23, 28–17, 17–10

Yaoundé

22 February 2015
16:00 (GMT +1)

Cameroon	80–68	Congo
Scoring by quarter: 24–16, 13–20, 26–17, 17–15

Yaoundé

==== Group G ====
Team	Pld	W	L	PF	PA	PD	Pts
Gabon	4	3	1	280	267	+13	7
Central African Republic	4	2	2	270	267	+3	6
Chad	4	1	3	241	257	−16	5

3 March 2015
19:00 (GMT +1)

Gabon	79–75 (OT)	Central African Republic
Scoring by quarter: 11–13, 20–18, 9–8, 25–26, Overtime: 14–10

Libreville

4 March 2015
19:00 (GMT +1)

Chad	61–65	Gabon

Libreville

5 March 2015
19:00 (GMT +1)

Chad	61–54	Central African Republic
Scoring by quarter: 15-11, 9-11, 15-17, 22-15

Libreville

6 March 2015
19:00 (GMT +1)

Central African Republic	75–64	Gabon
Scoring by quarter: 8–20, 21–10, 26–15, 20–19

Libreville

7 March 2015
19:00 (GMT +1)

Gabon	72–56	Chad
Scoring by quarter: 12–19, 24–3, 16–15, 20–19

Libreville

8 March 2015
19:00 (GMT +1)

Central African Republic	66–63 (OT)	Chad
Scoring by quarter: 16–17, 17–14, 11–10, 14–17, Overtime: 8–5

Libreville

=== Zone 5 ===
Zone 5 was played from September 21 to September 28 2014 in Kampala, Uganda.

Team	Pld	W	L	PF	PA	PD	Pts
Egypt	4	4	0	340	262	+78	8
Uganda	4	3	1	314	291	+23	7
Rwanda	4	2	2	291	296	−5	6
Kenya	4	1	3	298	329	−31	5
Somalia	4	0	4	293	358	−65	4

21 September 2014
15:00 (GMT +1)

Egypt	79–63	Rwanda
Scoring by quarter: 25–17, 8–17, 24–17, 22–12

Kampala

21 September 2014
19:00 (GMT +1)

Uganda	85–74	Somalia
Scoring by quarter: 21–23, 27–16, 18–19, 19–16

Kampala

22 September 2014
19:00 (GMT +1)

Somalia	79–97	Kenya
Scoring by quarter: 21–22, 16–25, 18–28, 24–22

Kampala

23 September 2014
17:00 (GMT +1)

Kenya	77–82	Rwanda
Scoring by quarter: 13–22, 22–24, 16–19, 26–17

Kampala

23 September 2014
19:00 (GMT +1)

Uganda	77–85	Egypt
Scoring by quarter: 8–21, 28–21, 14–21, 27–22

Kampala

24 September 2014
19:00 (GMT +1)

Rwanda	85–71	Somalia
Scoring by quarter: 21–12, 23–11, 19–19, 22–29

Kampala

26 September 2014
19:00 (GMT +1)

Egypt	85–53	Kenya
Scoring by quarter: 25–7, 17–13, 24–13, 19–20

Kampala

27 September 2014
17:00 (GMT +1)

Somalia	69–91	Egypt
Scoring by quarter: 18–20, 23–21, 11–25, 17–25

Kampala

27 September 2014
19:00 (GMT +1)

Kenya	71–83	Uganda
Scoring by quarter: 14–23, 18–21, 25–20, 14–19

Kampala

28 September 2014
19:00 (GMT +1)

Rwanda	61–69	Uganda
Scoring by quarter: 11–15, 19–13, 15–25, 16–16

Kampala

=== Zone 6 ===
==== Group I ====
Team	Pld	W	L	PF	PA	PD	Pts
Zimbabwe	4	3	1	258	241	+17	7
South Africa	4	2	2	243	250	−7	6
Seychelles	4	1	3	237	247	−10	5

21 February 2015
18:00 (GMT +1)

Zimbabwe	60–64	South Africa
Scoring by quarter: 10–11, 17–16, 16–23, 17–14

Bulawayo

22 February 2015
14:00 (GMT +1)

South Africa	60–52	Seychelles

Bulawayo

24 February 2015
18:00 (GMT +1)

Seychelles	61–69	Zimbabwe
Scoring by quarter: 10–16, 16–11, 11–24, 24–18

Bulawayo

25 February 2015
14:00 (GMT +1)

Zimbabwe	63–52	Seychelles
Scoring by quarter: 14–14, 10–8, 18–19, 21–11

Bulawayo

27 February 2015
14:00 (GMT +1)

Seychelles	72–55	South Africa
Scoring by quarter: 13–13, 13–14, 29–18, 17–10

Bulawayo

28 February 2015
18:00 (GMT +1)

South Africa	64–66 (OT)	Zimbabwe
Scoring by quarter: 7–15, 13–17, 25–13, 13–13, Overtime: 6–8

Bulawayo

==== Group J ====
Team	Pld	W	L	PF	PA	PD	Pts
Mozambique	2	2	0	130	108	+22	4
Botswana	2	0	2	108	130	−22	2

14 February 2015
19:00 (GMT +1)

Mozambique	61–40	Botswana
Scoring by quarter: 14–4, 11–11, 24–8, 12–17

Maputo

28 February 2015
20:00 (GMT +1)

Botswana	68–69	Mozambique

Gaborone

== Wild cards ==
Seven countries applied for three wild card berths. These include South Africa, Algeria, Central African Republic, Congo, Guinea, Rwanda and Senegal. After its meeting in March, the FIBA Africa Central Board announced that the announcement of the wild cards was postponed up to the end of April.

On early May, it was announced that Algeria, Central African Republic and Senegal were chosen by the Africa Board as the wild cards.
