= Botswana men's national under-18 basketball team =

Botswana
- FIBA zone: FIBA Africa

World Championships
- Appearances: None

Africa Championships
- Appearances: None

The Botswana men's national under-18 basketball team is a national basketball team of Botswana, administered by the Botswana Basketball Association (BBA).

It represents the country in international under-18 (under age 18) basketball competitions.

It appeared at the 2016 FIBA Africa Under-18 Championship qualifying round.

== See also ==
- Botswana men's national basketball team
- Botswana men's national under-16 basketball team
- Botswana women's national under-18 basketball team
