= Botswana men's national basketball team =

Botswana
- FIBA ranking: NR (3 March 2026)
- Joined FIBA: 1997
- FIBA zone: FIBA Africa
- National federation: Botswana Basketball Association (BBA)

Olympic Games
- Appearances: None

FIBA World Cup
- Appearances: None

African Championship
- Appearances: None
Home	Away

Botswana national basketball team is the national basketball team of Botswana. It is governed by the Botswana Basketball Association (BBA).

Botswana had its last noteworthy appearance at the AfroBasket 2015 qualification where, after a long battle, it ceded to Mozambique 68–69.

== History ==
=== Early Development and FIBA Membership ===
Botswana officially became a member of FIBA in 1997, opening the door to international competition. The national team began participating in AfroBasket qualifiers in the early 2000s, often facing more experienced teams from Southern Africa. Despite early setbacks, the team gained valuable exposure and experience.

=== Domestic League and Talent Pipeline ===
The rise of the Botswana Basketball League (BBL) has been instrumental in developing local talent. Clubs like BDF V and Troopers have dominated the domestic scene and contributed key players to the national squad. The league’s competitive structure has helped elevate the standard of play and provided a platform for scouting national team prospects.

=== Infrastructure and Community Engagement ===
Corporate partnerships have played a role in improving basketball infrastructure. In 2023, KFC Botswana refurbished the Tsholofelo Park basketball court in Gaborone, offering a vital training space for youth and national players alike.

=== Future Outlook ===
With continued investment in youth development, infrastructure, and coaching, Botswana is positioning itself to become a stronger force in African basketball.

== Current roster ==
Team for the 2015 Afrobasket Qualification:

Botswana men's national basketball team roster
Players
Coaches

Pos.	No.	Name	Age – Date of birth	Height	Club
G		Ofentse Churchill Barrows	24 – 18 February 1991	1.88 m (6 ft 2 in)	Cameo	(Zimbabwe)
		Chinouya Kumbirai Chinouya	–
		Thabo Petrus Gaborone	–		Dolphins BC	(Botswana)
G		Thuto Taelo Gaborone	23 – 13 August 1992	1.81 m (5 ft 11 in)	Spartans BC	(Botswana)
G		Karabo Reinhard Geche	–	1.88 m (6 ft 2 in)	Wuhan University of Technology	(China)
		Tuelo Michael Masilo	22 – 5 April 1993		Dolphins BC	(Botswana)
		Tshepo Mixon	–
PG		Bathusi Tirelo	–	1.70 m (5 ft 7 in)
		Thatayaone Patrick Mokgethi	–		Dolphins BC	(Botswana)
SG		Robert Bendo Mosalakatane	24 – 5 June 1991		Spartans BC	(Botswana)
		Tlale John Mosetlhe	–
		Israel Mphato	–
G		Patrick Mbaakanyi Ndawanyana	–	1.91 m (6 ft 3 in)
		Ketlwaelo Rahube	–
F		Emmanuel Ramoshebi	–	1.93 m (6 ft 4 in)
		Teko Bokang Malede Sekgwama	–
		Eric Jacob Sentongo-Lukwago	–
		Nnaemeka S.Eze	–
		Dumezeweni Joseph Sethlare	–
		Thuto Shai	–

Head coach

- (Zambia) William Nyangu

Assistant coach(es)

- (Zimbabwe) Trynos Moyo

Legend

- Club – describes last
  club before the tournament
- Age – describes age
  on 19 August 2015

== Competitive record ==
=== AfroBasket ===
Botswana has never qualified for a AfroBasket main tournament, however, it has appeared in several qualification rounds.

AfroBasket record						Qualification record			
Year	Round	Position	GP	W	L	GP	W	L	–
(Senegal) 1997	Did not qualify								
(Angola) 1999	Did not qualify								
(Morocco) 2001	Did not qualify								
(Egypt) 2003	Did not qualify								
(Algeria) 2005	Did not qualify								
(Angola) 2007	Did not qualify								
(Libya) 2009	Did not qualify					Did not enter			
(Madagascar) 2011	Did not qualify					Did not enter			
(Ivory Coast) 2013	Did not qualify					Did not enter			
(Tunisia) 2015	Did not qualify					2	0	2	2015
(Tunisia) (Senegal) 2017	Did not qualify					Did not enter			
(Rwanda) 2021	Did not qualify					Did not enter			
(Angola) 2025	Did not qualify					Did not enter			
Total	0/12		5	1	4	12	1	11	–

== See also ==
- Botswana national under-19 basketball team
- Botswana national under-17 basketball team
- Botswana national 3x3 team
- Botswana women's national basketball team
