= Mariam Konaté =

Canadian-Ivorian basketball player (born 2000)

Mariam Konate
Personal information
- Born: August 21, 2000 (age 26)
- Listed height: 5 ft 11 in (1.80 m)

Career information
- High school: Stephen Leacock Collegiate Institute
- College: George Brown College
- Position: Forward
- Number: 21

Mariam Konaté (born August 21, 2000) is an Ivorian basketball player. She plays for Ivory Coast women's national basketball team.

== High school ==
Konaté went to Stephen Leacock Collegiate Institute.

== College ==
She was a student of George Brown College, majoring in General Arts and Science. She was part of the women basketball team; George Brown Huskies, where she averaged 13.0 points per game, 4.6 rebounds and 1.3 assists.

== National Team Career ==
Konaté participated in the 2021 Fiba's women's Afrobasket with her national team and averaged 4.3 points per game,1.3 rebounds per game and 1.3 assists.
