= Nadine Mohamed (basketball) =

Egyptian basketball player

No. 14 – Al Ahly

Personal information
- Born: January 21, 1998 (age 28) Egypt
- Listed height: 5 ft 11 in (1.80 m)

Career information
- High school: Mokattam Language School
- College: UNC Greensboro Spartans women's basketball
- NBA draft: 2020: undrafted
- Playing career: 2020–present

Career history
- 2020–present: Al Ahly

Nadine Mohamed Sayed Soliman Mohamed (Arabic: نادين محمد سيد سليمان محمد; born January 21, 1998), known also as Nadine Selaawi (نادين السلعاوي), is an Egyptian basketball player. She plays for Al Ahly and the Egyptian national team.

== Early life ==
Mohamed is the daughter of Mohamed and Iman Soliman. She attended Mokattam Language School in Cairo, Egypt and graduated with an academic award. She played college basketball for the University of North Carolina Greensboro Spartans women's basketball.

== International career ==
Mohamed participated with the Egyptian U16 national team at the 2013 Africa Championship. She also represented the Egyptian U17 national team during the 2014 World Championship, where she averaged 14.3 points and 4.0 rebounds while shooting 45 percent from the field. In addition, she played for the Egyptian U19 national team during the 2015 World Championship.

Mohamed played for the Egyptian senior basketball team at the AfroBasket Women 2015, followed by the 2021 Women's Afrobasket, in which she averaged 16.8 points, 4.7 rebounds and 1.7 assists. She also participated in the 2023 Women's Afrobasket.

Furthermore, she represented Egypt national 3x3 team, where she won the gold medal in the 2022 Africa Cup, and silver in 2023. She also featured in the 2023 FIBA 3x3 World Cup.
