= Assétou Diakité =

Malian basketball player (born 1998)

No. 32 – Stade Malien
- Position: Center
- League: MD1

Personal information
- Born: 15 February 1998 (age 28) Bamako, Mali
- Listed height: 1.93 m (6 ft 4 in)
- Listed weight: 75 kg (165 lb)

Assétou Diakité (born 15 February 1998) is a Malian basketball player for Stade Malien and the Malian national team.

She represented Mali at the 2019 Women's Afrobasket.
