= Abiba Kone =

Ivorian Female basketballer

Abiba Kone (born 25 June 1998) is an Ivorian basketball player representing the national women's basketball team. Abiba Kone plays as a Guard. She plays for CSA in her country, Ivory Coast. She is 5 feet 9 inches (176cm) tall. She is a native of Treichville.

== Career statistics ==
Abiba's performance is summarized for both the Senior National Team and the National Team Youth across various events and years. In the 2023 FIBA Women's AfroBasket, she played three games, averaging 0.7 points per game (PPG), 1.7 rebounds per game (RPG), 0.7 assists per game (APG), and earning an efficiency (EFF) rating of 1.3. During the 2021 FIBA Women's AfroBasket, Abiba participated in six games, averaging 0.3 points, 0.7 rebounds, 0.3 assists, and an EFF rating of 0.3. Additionally, in the 2017 FIBA Women's Afrobasket, she played ten games, averaging 5.4 points, 1.2 rebounds, 2 assists, and an EFF rating of 2.6. Overall, her total average across these senior team events stands at 2.1 points, 1.2 rebounds, 1 assist, and an EFF rating of 1.4.

In her performances for the National Team Youth, Abiba participated in the 2013 FIBA Africa U16 Championship for Women, playing six games with averages of 4.7 points, 3.5 rebounds, 1.2 assists, and an EFF rating of 2. Her total average across these youth team events stands at 4.7 points, 3.5 rebounds, 1.2 assists, and an EFF rating of 2.
