= Lala Wane =

Senegalese basketball player

No. 14 – USO Basket
- Position: Forward
- League: LFB

Personal information
- Born: July 15, 1989 (age 37)
- Listed height: 1.82 m (6 ft 0 in)
- Listed weight: 78 kg (172 lb)

Career information
- WNBA draft: 2011: undrafted

Lala Wane (born July 15, 1989) is a Senegalese basketball player for USO Basket. She represented Senegal in the basketball competition at the 2016 Summer Olympics.
