= Goundo Diallo =

Malian basketball player (born 1997)

No. 19 – Sainte Savine Basket
- Position: Forward
- League: LFB

Personal information
- Born: 19 May 1997 (age 29)
- Listed height: 1.76 m (5 ft 9 in)

Career information
- WNBA draft: 2019: undrafted

Goundo Diallo (born 19 May 1997) is a Malian basketball player for Sainte Savine Basket and the Malian national team.

She represented Mali at the 2019 Women's Afrobasket.
