= Moroccan Women's Basketball Championship =

Moroccan Women's Basketball League
- Sport: Basketball
- Founded: 1977
- No. of teams: 8
- Country: Morocco
- Continent: FIBA Africa (Africa)

The Moroccan Women's Basketball Championship (French: Championnat du Maroc féminin de basket-ball) is the highest women's professional club basketball competition in Morocco.
