= Neidy Ocuane =

Mozambican basketball player

No. 4 – UTEP Miners
- Position: Guard

Personal information
- Born: 22 June 1997 (age 29) Maputo, Mozambique
- Listed height: 5 ft 5 in (1.65 m)

Career information
- College: Seward County CC Associates degree (2015–2017); UTEP Bachelor’s degree (2017–2020); Ph.D. In chemistry (2021-2025)
- Playing career: 2007–2020

Neidy da Luz Virgínia Ocuane (born 22 June 1997) is a Mozambican professional basketball player who currently plays for UTEP Miners.

== Career ==
Dr. Ocuane was born on 22 June 1997 in Maputo. She started practicing basketball in 2007 at the Escola Primária do Jardim. One day a coach appeared at her school and invited all the students to practice basketball. After consulting with her family she made the decision to pursue basketball. Her first organized team was Costa do Sol in the Campeonato da Ciudade De Maputo. They were a group of 100 students, but some were leaving until only four players remained.

She earned a Ph.D. in Chemistry from UTEP.

She captained the under-16 national team at the 2013 FIBA Africa Under-16 Championship for Women, winning tournament MVP honors after leading them to a third-place finish.
