= Indira Evora =

American-Cape Verdean basketball player

Personal information
- Born: October 28, 1994 (age 32) Cape Verde
- Listed height: 5 ft 9 in (1.75 m)

Career information
- High school: Somerville High School
- College: Saint Michael's College
- Position: Guard
- Number: 33

Indira Evora (born October 28, 1994) is a basketball player. She is an assistant coach with the Franklin Pierce University women's basketball program and also plays for the Cape Verdean Women National basketball team.

== High school ==
Evora played four years of varsity basketball and was a member of the track & field team for one year at Somerville High School. In her senior year, she averaged 21.4 points per game, 5.0 rebounds, 4.3 steals, and 4.1 assists and also served as the captain of her team.

== College ==
As a freshman, she played all of team's 25 games with 16 starts. She averaged 10.6 points per game, 23 three-pointers and 40 assists. Also as a sophomore she played all 27 of team's games, starting 26 times. And averaged 10.1 points, 4.2 rebounds, 2.7 steals and 2.3 assists.

== Career ==
In the 2017–2018 season Evora coached the high school junior varsity team in her hometown of Somerville, Massachusetts. Evora has a college degree in Business Administration from Saint Michael's College and has done work towards her MBA in sports management at Franklin Pierce. And also, an assistant coach with the Franklin Pierce University Women's Basketball program.

== National team career ==
She participated in the FIBA's women afro basket with her national team both in 2019 and 2021, she averaged 3.3 point, 1.7 rebounds, 0.3 assist and 1 point, 2 rebounds and 1 assist respectively.
