= Lena Niang =

Senegalese basketball player

No. 89 – Temple Owls
- Position: Center
- League: AAC

Personal information
- Born: 20 September 1996 (age 30) Bowie, Maryland, U.S.
- Listed height: 1.86 m (6 ft 1 in)

Career information
- College: Temple (2016–present)
Medals
Women's basketball
Representing Senegal
AfroBasket
Silver medal – second place	2019 Senegal

Lena Niang (born 20 September 1996) is a Senegalese basketball player for Temple Owls and the Senegalese national team.

She represented Senegal at the 2019 Women's Afrobasket.
