= Analeesia Fernandes =

American-Cape Verdean basketball player

No. 6 – Rhode island
- Position: Forward

Personal information
- Born: December 12, 1999 (age 26) Cape Verde
- Listed height: 5 ft 10 in (1.78 m)

Career information
- High school: Brockton High School
- College: Rhode Island College

Analeesia Fernandes (born Dec 12, 1999) is a Cape Verdean basketballer who played for Rhode Island College. She now plays for the Cape Verde women's basketball team.

== High school ==
Fernandes is a 2018 graduate of Brockton High School. She was named the team's MVP in her senior year.

== College ==
As a freshman at Rhode Island College she played in 23 games, averaging 3.7 points and 3.2 rebounds per game.

== National team career ==
She participated in the 2019 and 2021 FIBA Women's AfroBasket events with her national team and averaged 4.7 points, 1 rebounds, 0.3 and 6.3 points, 3.7 rebounds, 0.3 assists respectively.
