= Djeneba N'Diaye =

Malian basketball player (born 1997)

No. 4 – AMI Basketball
- Position: Guard
- League: MBC

Personal information
- Born: 8 July 1997 (age 29) Bamako, Mali
- Listed height: 1.72 m (5 ft 8 in)

Career information
- WNBA draft: 2019: undrafted
Medals
Women's basketball
Representing Mali
AfroBasket
Silver medal – second place	2021 Cameroon
Silver medal – second place	2025 Ivory Coast
Bronze medal – third place	2019 Senegal
Bronze medal – third place	2023 Rwanda
African Games
Gold medal – first place	2015 Brazzaville	Team
Silver medal – second place	2019 Rabat	3x3

Djeneba N'Diaye (born 8 July 1997) is a Malian basketball player for AMI Basketball and the Malian national team.

She represented Mali at the 2019 Women's Afrobasket.
