= Hanna Amani =

Ivorian basketball player (born 1996)

Hanna Amani (born April 11, 1996, in Ivory Coast) is an Ivorian basketball player who represents the national women's basketball team as a guard. She is 5 feet 5 inches (166cm) tall. In the 2021 season, she played for Club Sportif in Abidjan. Hanna Amani started her basketball career in her native country, Ivory Coast.

== Career statistics ==
In the 2023 FIBA Women's AfroBasket, she competed in three matches, maintaining an average of 4 points per game (PPG), 2.3 rebounds per game (RPG), and 2.7 assists per game (APG), achieving an efficiency (EFF) rating of 4. During the 2021 FIBA Women's AfroBasket, Hanna participated in six games, with an average of 4 points, 0.7 rebounds, 1.5 assists, and an EFF rating of 2.5. Moreover, in the 2019 FIBA Women's Afrobasket, she played six games, averaging 2.2 points, 1.7 rebounds, 0.7 assists, and an EFF rating of 2.3. Additionally, in the 2015 Afrobasket Women, she contributed in one game, averaging 3 points. Her cumulative average across these senior team events stands at 3.2 points, 0.9 rebounds, 1 assist, and an EFF rating of 1.8.

Hanna also took part in the 2014 Afrobasket U18 Women, engaging in seven games with averages of 11 points, 3.4 rebounds, 2.1 assists, and an EFF rating of 5. Her overall average across these youth team events stands at 11 points, 3.4 rebounds, 2.1 assists, and an EFF rating of 5.
