= List of Atlético Petróleos de Luanda basketball players =

Atlético Petróleos de Luanda is an Angolan basketball club from Luanda, Angola that plays their home games at Pavilhão da Cidadela in Luanda. The club was established in 1980.

== 2011–2018 ==
Atlético Petróleos de Luanda basketball players 2011–2017

Nat	#	Name	A	P	H	W	–	Lazare Adingono						
Nat	#	Name	A	P	H	W	2011	2012	2013	2014	2015	2016	2017	2018
Nat	#	Name	A	P	H	W	4	2	1	2	1	2	–	–
(Angola)	⋅	Abdel Gomes	25	C	2.03	–	2011	2012	18	18	⋅	⋅	⋅	⋅
(Angola)	15	Aboubakar Gakou	21	PF	–	–	⋅	⋅	⋅	⋅	⋅	–	15	2018
(Angola)	11	André Miguel	29	C	1.98	99	⋅	⋅	⋅	⋅	⋅	⋅	→	2018
(Angola)	⋅	Bráulio Morais	23	PG	1.85	90	⋅	2012	5	⋅	⋅	⋅	⋅	⋅
(Angola)	⋅	Carlos Morais	28	SG	1.92	96	2011	2012	6	→	⋅	⋅	⋅	⋅
(United States)	⋅	Cedric Isom	27	SG	1.88	88	2011	→	⋅	⋅	⋅	⋅	⋅	⋅
(United States)	⋅	Cheyenne Moore	28	SF	1.98	95	⋅	2012	⋅	⋅	⋅	⋅	⋅	⋅
(Angola)	5	Childe Dundão	20	PG	–	–	⋅	⋅	⋅	⋅	→	–	5	2018
(Angola)	4	Cley Cabanga	20	F	1.87	⋅	⋅	⋅	⋅	⋅	⋅	⋅	⋅	2018
(Angola)	⋅	Delcio Ucuahamba	24	SF	1.94	92	⋅	⋅	⋅	⋅	⋅	7	→	⋅
(Angola)	14	Domingos Bonifácio	33	PG	1.89	76	⋅	⋅	→	14	14	14	14	2018
(Angola)	6	Edmir Lucas	24	SG	1.88	88	⋅	⋅	⋅	⋅	⋅	→	6	2018
(Angola)	⋅	Edson do Rosário	33	PF	1.93	–	⋅	⋅	⋅	⋅	21	⋅	⋅	⋅
(Angola)	⋅	Eduardo Ferreira	25	SF	1.89	90	⋅	⋅	⋅	⋅	20	⋅	⋅	⋅
(Angola)	⋅	Eric Norman	29	SF	1.90	91	⋅	2012	19	12	→	⋅	⋅	⋅
(Angola)	8	Erickson Silva	25	⋅	–	–	⋅	⋅	⋅	⋅	⋅	⋅	8	2018
(Angola)	⋅	Francisco Destino		⋅		–	⋅	⋅	⋅	–	⋅	⋅	⋅	⋅
(Angola)	18	Gerson Gonçalves	21	SG	1.93	78	⋅	⋅	⋅	→	18	18	18	2018
(Angola)	⋅	Hélder Gonçalves		⋅			2011	⋅	⋅	⋅	⋅	⋅	⋅	⋅
(Angola)	⋅	Hermenegildo Mbunga	32	PF	2.04	98	2011	2012	16	16	16	16	16	→
(Angola)	⋅	Idelfonso Kiteculo		⋅			2011	→	⋅	⋅	⋅	⋅	⋅	⋅
(United States)	⋅	Jason Cain	31	C	2.07	107	⋅	⋅	⋅	→	23	23	→	⋅
(Portugal)	⋅	João Fernandes	25	C	2.02	–	⋅	⋅	⋅	⋅	17	⋅	⋅	⋅
(Angola)	17	Joaquim Pedro	21	PG	1.82	80	⋅	⋅	→	7	7	17	17	2018
(Angola)	⋅	Joceliano Pessoa		⋅	–	–	⋅	⋅	⋅	⋅	22	⋅	⋅	⋅
(United States)	⋅	Joe Ebondo	⋅	SF	2.01	100	⋅	⋅	⋅	⋅	⋅	⋅	10	⋅
(Angola)	9	José António	28	PG	⋅		⋅	⋅	⋅	⋅	⋅	⋅	→	2018
(United States)	⋅	Justin Johnson		SF	1.90	–	⋅	⋅	⋅	6	⋅	⋅	⋅	⋅
(United States)	⋅	Keith Cothran	27	SF	1.93	91	⋅	2012	8	⋅	⋅	⋅	⋅	⋅
(Angola)	13	Leonel Paulo	31	PF	1.97	93	⋅	2012	13	13	13	13	13	2018
(Angola)	⋅	Ludgero Galiza	25	SF	⋅	⋅	⋅	⋅	⋅	⋅	⋅	→	4	→
(Angola)	7	Malcon Tungo	⋅	⋅	–	–	⋅	⋅	⋅	⋅	⋅	⋅	⋅	2018
(Dominican Republic)	⋅	Manny Quezada	32	PG	1.84	84	⋅	⋅	⋅	→	12	12	→	⋅
(Angola)	⋅	Miguel Kiala	24	C	2.04	91	2011	2012	11	11	→	⋅	⋅	⋅
(Nigeria)	16	Olalekan Ajayi	26	C	2.11	111	⋅	⋅	⋅	⋅	⋅	⋅	⋅	2018
(Cameroon)	⋅	Parfait Bitee	28	SG	1.88	91	⋅	2012	14	→	⋅	⋅	⋅	⋅
(Angola)	23	Pascoal Konde	⋅	⋅	–	–	⋅	⋅	⋅	⋅	⋅	⋅	⋅	2018
(Angola)	⋅	Paulo Barros	24	SF	1.95	–	2011	2012	9	→	⋅	⋅	⋅	⋅
(Angola)	⋅	Paulo Santana	32	PG	1.82	84	2011	2012	10	10	10	10	→	⋅
(Angola)	⋅	Pedro Bastos	24	SF	1.91	87	⋅	2012	4	4	4	4	7	→
(Angola)	⋅	Reggie Moore	36	PF	1.98	107	⋅	⋅	⋅	⋅	→	8	23	⋅
(Angola)	⋅	Roberto Fortes	31	SF	1.93	88	2011	⋅	⋅	5	5	→	⋅	⋅
(Angola)	⋅	Romenique Samba		⋅			2011	⋅	⋅	⋅	⋅	⋅	⋅	⋅
(United States)	⋅	Roderick Nealy	34	PF	2.01	95	2011	⋅	→	23	→	⋅	⋅	⋅
(Cape Verde) (Guinea)	10	Sékou Ba Condé	29	C	1.95	95	⋅	⋅	⋅	⋅	⋅	⋅	→	2018
(Angola)	⋅	Simão Santos		⋅			2011	⋅	⋅	⋅	⋅	⋅	⋅	⋅
(Angola)	⋅	Teotónio Dó	23	C	2.06	110	⋅	⋅	⋅	⋅	⋅	11	11	→
(Angola)	⋅	Valdelício Joaquim	24	C	2.08	109	⋅	⋅	⋅	15	→	⋅	⋅	⋅
(Angola)	⋅	Vladimir Pontes		⋅			2011	2012	⋅	⋅	⋅	⋅	⋅	⋅
(Angola)	⋅	Vladimir Ricardino	37	⋅	1.98		⋅	⋅	→	9	9	→	⋅	⋅
(Angola)	⋅	Walter Tadeu	26	PG	1.78	79	⋅	⋅	⋅	⋅	⋅	9	→	⋅
(Angola)	⋅	Yuri Suingue		⋅			2011	⋅	⋅	⋅	⋅	⋅	⋅	⋅
(Angola)	⋅	Zola Paulo	29	C	2.02	125	⋅	⋅	⋅	⋅	⋅	→	9	⋅

== 1991–2000 ==
Atlético Petróleos de Luanda basketball players 1991–2000
# = Angola league winner

Nat	Name	A	P	H	W	–	–	–	–	–	–	–	W.R.	–	–
Nat	Name	A	P	H	W	1991	1992	1993	1994	1995	1996	1997	1998	1999	2000
Nat	Name	A	P	H	W	–	–	–	–	–	–	–	–	–	–
(Angola)	Benjamim Ucuahamba Avô	33	PG	1.83	⋅	⋅	⋅	⋅	⋅	⋅	⋅	⋅	1998	⋅	⋅
(Angola)	Benjamim Romano	29	PG	1.90	⋅	⋅	⋅	⋅	⋅	⋅	⋅	⋅	1998	⋅	⋅
(Angola)	Carlos Almeida	22	SF	1.93	⋅	⋅	⋅	⋅	⋅	⋅	⋅	⋅	1998	⋅	⋅
(Angola)	Edmar Victoriano Baduna	23	F	1.95	⋅	⋅	⋅	⋅	⋅	⋅	⋅	⋅	1998	⋅	⋅
(Angola)	Joaquim Gomes Kikas	17	C	2.02	⋅	⋅	⋅	⋅	⋅	⋅	⋅	⋅	1998	⋅	⋅
(Angola)	Mário Belarmino	24	PF	1.96	⋅	⋅	⋅	⋅	⋅	⋅	⋅	⋅	1998	⋅	⋅
(Angola)	Pedro Kialunda	⋅	⋅	⋅	⋅	⋅	⋅	⋅	⋅	⋅	⋅	⋅	1998	⋅	⋅
(Angola)	Rui Dinis	⋅	⋅	⋅	⋅	⋅	⋅	⋅	⋅	⋅	⋅	⋅	1998	⋅	⋅
(Angola)	Victor de Carvalho	29	SG	1.93	⋅	⋅	⋅	⋅	⋅	⋅	⋅	⋅	1998	⋅	⋅

== See also ==
- Category:Atlético Petróleos de Luanda basketball players
