= 2010–11 BAI Basket =

BAI Basket 2010–11
- League: BAI Basket
- Sport: Basketball
- Duration: November 26, 2010 – May 28, 2011
- Teams: 12
- TV partner: TPA1 (Angola) TPA Internacional (Worldwide) Supersport (Africa)

BAI Basket season
- Champions: Petro Atlético
- Season MVP: (Angola) Olímpio Cipriano

BAI Basket seasons
- ← 2009–10 2011–12 →

The 2010–11 season of BAI Basket (33rd edition) ran from November 26, 2010, to May 28, 2011, with 12 teams playing the regular season in a double round robin system (regular season). The six best teams played a double round robin tournament for the title in serie A and the last six did the same for the consolation group, serie B.

== BAI Basket participants (2010–11 season) ==
Team	Home
ASA	Luanda
CDUAN	Luanda
Interclube	Luanda
Petro Atlético	Luanda
Primeiro de Agosto	Luanda
Recreativo do Libolo	Luanda
Santos FC	Luanda
Sporting de Cabinda	Cabinda
Sporting de Luanda	Luanda
Universidade Lusíadas	Luanda
Vila Clotilde	Luanda
Clube Desportivo Vila Estoril	Luanda

== Regular season (November 25, 2010 - March 31, 2011 ==
	ASA	CDU	INT	PET	PRI	LIB	SAN	SCC	SCL	LUS	VIL	EST	Rec.
ASA			83-100		95-107	90-95		85-83			93-70		
CDUAN						92-117	105-74		89-86				
Interclube	80-83	92-88		95-88	85-95	51-84	102-67	87-90	98-52				
Petro Atlético	81-75		83-72		77-91	59-82	93-49	94-73	113-55		123-67		
Primeiro de Agosto	101-58	102-72	68-81	97-92		98-74	115-65	93-81	101-53	111-64			
Recreativo do Libolo	90-84		74-89	87-82	86-75			86-46	89-55		126-60		
Santos FC													
Sporting de Cabinda					67-94						94-53		
Sporting de Luanda													
Universidade Lusíada				36-97		69-97			69-59		67-61	106-66	
Vila Clotilde		90-99			61-124							66-60	
Vila Estoril			72-105				65-111		62-88				
Record													

The home team is listed on the left-hand column.
The rightmost column and the bottom row list the teams' home and away records respectively.

Regular season standings

P	Team	Pts
1	Primeiro de Agosto	
2	Recreativo do Libolo	
3	Interclube	
4	Petro Atlético	
5	ASA	
6	Sporting de Cabinda	
7	Universidade Lusíadas	
8	CDUAN	
9	Sporting de Luanda	
10	Vila Clotilde	
11	Vila Estoril	
12	Santos FC	

== Group stage (April 1–16, 2011) ==
Serie A

	ASA	INT	PET	PRI	LIB	SCC	Rec.
ASA							
Interclube						90-61	
Petro Atlético	87-79	76-77					
Primeiro de Agosto	100-87	83-85	96-85		85-96		
Recreativo do Libolo	90-84		80-72				
Sporting de Cabinda							
Record							

Serie B

	CDU	SAN	SCL	LUS	VIL	EST	Rec.
CDUAN							
Santos FC				69-64			
Sporting Luanda						85-61	
Lusíadas							
Vila Clotilde							
Vila Estoril							
Record							

The home team is listed on the left-hand column.
The rightmost column and the bottom row list the teams' home and away records respectively.

Serie A

P	Team	Pts
1	Recreativo do Libolo	
2	Primeiro de Agosto	
3	Petro Atlético	
4	Interclube	
5	ASA	
6	Sporting de Cabinda	

Serie B

P	Team	Pts
1	Universidade Lusíadas	
2	Sporting de Luanda	
3	CDUAN	
4	Vila Clotilde	
5	Vila Estoril	
6	Santos FC	

== Serie C - 9th-12t (April 29 - May 28, 2011) ==
	CDU	CDU	EST	EST	SAN	SAN	VIL	VIL	Rec.
CDUAN			98-100	61-92	0-20	92-74	101-105	98-118	1-5
Vila Estoril	20-0	96-99			55-85	86-99	94-90	83-86	2-4
Santos FC	100-71	90-79	83-88	96-102			91-107	0-20	2-4
Vila Clotilde	97-74	79-70	90-63	107-84	113-83	80-64			6-0
Record		1-5		4-2		3-3		5-1	

== Serie B - 5th-8th (April 29 - May 28, 2011) ==
	ASA	ASA	LUS	LUS	SCC	SCC	SCL	SCL	Rec.
ASA			100-63	91-83	71-64	72-65	62-41	68-46	6-0
Lusíada	71-81	62-91			73-85	66-76	70-81	77-51	1-5
Sporting Cabinda	70-72	73-89	97-84	88-82			73-44	63-52	4-2
Sporting Luanda	79-87	63-74	79-66	57-75	52-74	46-67			1-5
Record		6-0		1-5		4-2		1-5	

== Serie A - final four (April 29 - May 28, 2011) ==
	INT	INT	PET	PET	PRI	PRI	LIB	LIB	Rec.
Interclube			84-96	84-72	93-89	101-90	73-78	78-88	3-3
Petro Atlético	87-77	89-78			101-90	102-121	89-76	79-63	5-1
Primeiro de Agosto	85-82	80-86	93-98	88-69			84-89	86-74	3-3
Recreativo do Libolo	72-85	77-65	95-99	89-94	68-78	95-94			2-4
Record		2-4		4-2		2-4		3-3	

- Interclube vs. 1º de Agosto

April 29, 2011
18:00 WAT

Interclube	93–89	1º de Agosto

Pavilhão 28 de Fevereiro, Luanda

May 10, 2011
18:00 WAT

1º de Agosto	85–82	Interclube
		Pts: E.Camacho 27

Pavilhão do CODENM, Luanda

May 17, 2011
18:00 WAT

Interclube	101–90	1º de Agosto
		Pts: J.Gomes 20

Pavilhão 28 de Fevereiro, Luanda

May 24, 2011
18:00 WAT

1º de Agosto	80–86	Interclube
Pts: F.Ambrósio 21		Pts: E.Mingas 17

Pavilhão do CODENM, Luanda

- R. do Libolo vs. Petro Atlético

April 29, 2011
18:00 WAT

Report (in Portuguese)

R. do Libolo	95–99	Petro Atlético
Scoring by quarter: 24-12, 14-27, 33-28, 24-32
Pts: R.Moore 29		Pts: R.Nealy, C.Isom 17

Pavilhão da Cidadela, Luanda

May 10, 2011
18:00 WAT

Report (in Portuguese)

Petro Atlético	89–76	R. do Libolo
Scoring by quarter: 33-21, 16-22, 24-8, 16-25
Pts: M.Kiala 17		Pts: S.Santos 17

Pavilhão da Cidadela, Luanda

May 17, 2011
19:00 WAT

Report (in Portuguese)

R. do Libolo	89–94	Petro Atlético
Scoring by quarter: 31-26, 10-22, 22-17, 27-34
Pts: Olímpio 19		Pts: C.Isom 19

Pavilhão da Cidadela, Luanda

May 24, 2011
18:00 WAT

Report (in Portuguese)

Petro Atlético	79–63	R. do Libolo
Scoring by quarter: 15-14, 20-23, 22-13, 22-13
Pts: R.Nealy 19		Pts: Olímpio 17

Pavilhão da Cidadela, Luanda

- R. do Libolo vs. 1º de Agosto

April 30, 2011
18:00 WAT

Report (in Portuguese)

R. do Libolo	68–78	1º de Agosto
Scoring by quarter: 12-23, 14-14, 28-25, 14-16
Pts: Olímpio 26		Pts: Kikas 32

Pavilhão da Cidadela, Luanda

May 12, 2011
18:00 WAT

Report (in Portuguese)

1º de Agosto	84–89	R. do Libolo
Pts: F.Ambrósio 23		Pts: Bonifácio 26

Pavilhão do CODENM, Luanda

May 19, 2011
18:00 WAT

Report (in Portuguese)

R. do Libolo	95–94	1º de Agosto
Scoring by quarter: 20-24, 28-30, 23-26, 24-14
Pts: Mílton 30		Pts: Kikas 18

Pavilhão da Cidadela, Luanda

May 26, 2011
18:00 WAT

Report (in Portuguese)

1º de Agosto	86–74	R. do Libolo
Scoring by quarter: 21-17, 22-23, 21-18, 22-16
Pts: H.Santos 20		Pts: Mílton, F.Camacho 16

Pavilhão do CODENM, Luanda

- Petro Atlético vs. Interclube

April 30, 2011
18:00 WAT

Report (in Portuguese)

Petro Atlético	87–77	Interclube
Pts: C.Isom 18		Pts: E.Camacho 21

Pavilhão da Cidadela, Luanda

May 12, 2011
18:00 WAT

Interclube	84–96	Petro Atlético
Scoring by quarter: 31-21, 21-23, 12-32, 20-20

Pavilhão 28 de Fevereiro, Luanda

May 19, 2011
18:00 WAT

Report (in Portuguese)

Petro Atlético	89–78	Interclube
Scoring by quarter: 21-31, 23-21, 32-12, 20-20
Pts: R.Nealy 26		Pts: Mingas 23

Pavilhão da Cidadela, Luanda

May 26, 2011
18:00 WAT

Interclube	84–72	Petro Atlético

Pavilhão 28 de Fevereiro, Luanda

- Interclube vs. R. do Libolo

May 3, 2011
18:00 WAT

Report (in Portuguese)

Interclube	73–78	R. do Libolo
Scoring by quarter: 6-27, 16-24
Pts: E.Camacho 20		Pts: S.Santos 21

Pavilhão 28 de Fevereiro, Luanda

May 14, 2011
18:00 WAT

Report (in Portuguese)

R. do Libolo	72–85	Interclube
Scoring by quarter: 23-21, 12-21, 18-25, 19-18
Pts: L.Paulo 20		Pts: E.Camacho 15

Pavilhão da Cidadela, Luanda

May 21, 2011
18:00 WAT

Interclube	78–88	R. do Libolo

Pavilhão 28 de Fevereiro, Luanda

May 28, 2011
18:00 WAT

Report (in Portuguese)

R. do Libolo	77–65	Interclube
Pts: Olímpio 27		Pts: L.Costa 19

Pavilhão da Cidadela, Luanda

- 1º de Agosto vs. Petro Atlético

May 3, 2011
18:00 WAT

1º de Agosto	93–98	Petro Atlético

Pavilhão do CODENM, Luanda

May 14, 2011
19:00 WAT

Report (in Portuguese)

Petro Atlético	106–88	1º de Agosto
Scoring by quarter: 32-20, 15-21, 32-21, 27-22
Pts: Mingas, Goffney 19		Pts: Olímpio 28

Pavilhão da Cidadela, Luanda

May 21, 2011
18:00 WAT

Report (in Portuguese)

1º de Agosto	88–69	Petro Atlético
Scoring by quarter: 29-13, 17-16
Pts: C.Almeida 19; Rebs: Kikas, Ambrósio 12		Pts: C.Morais 21; Rebs: M.Kiala 13

Pavilhão do CODENM, Luanda

May 28, 2011
18:00 WAT

Report (in Portuguese)

Petro Atlético	102–121	1º de Agosto
Scoring by quarter: 24-27, 25-32, 33-27, 20-35
Pts: C.Morais 31		Pts: C.Almeida 25

Pavilhão da Cidadela, Luanda

== Final standings ==
P	Team	Pts
1	Petro Atlético	19
2	Recreativo do Libolo	15
3	Interclube	14
4	Primeiro de Agosto	13
5	ASA	
6	Sporting de Cabinda	
7	Universidade Lusíada	
8	Sporting de Luanda	
9	Vila Clotilde	
10	Vila Estoril	
11	Santos FC	
12	CDUAN	

== Awards ==
2011 BAI Basket MVP

- (Angola) Olímpio Cipriano (Recreativo do Libolo) 280pts

2011 BAI Basket Top Scorer

- (Angola) C.Morais (Petro Atlético) 209

2011 BAI Basket Top Rebounder

- (Angola) Miguel Kiala (Petro Atlético) 75/48

2011 BAI Basket Top Assists

- (Angola) Olímpio Cipriano (Recreativo do Libolo) 44

2011 BAI Basket

Atlético Petróleos de Luanda
11th Title

Most Valuable Player
(Angola) Olímpio Cipriano

== See also ==
- 2011 Angola Basketball Cup
- 2011 Angola Basketball Super Cup
- 2011 Victorino Cunha Cup
