= 2009–10 BAI Basket =

BAI Basket 2009–10
- League: BAI Basket
- Sport: Basketball
- Duration: November 13, 2009 – June 15, 2010
- Teams: 12
- TV partner: TPA1 (Angola) TPA Internacional (Worldwide) Supersport (Africa)

BAI Basket season
- Champions: Primeiro de Agosto
- Season MVP: (Angola) Joaquim Gomes

BAI Basket seasons
- ← 2008–09 2010–11 →

The 2009–10 Season of BAI Basket (32nd edition) ran from November 13, 2009 to June 15, 2010, with 12 teams playing in three different stages: in stage one (regular season) teams played a double round robin system. In stage two, the six best teams played a single round robin tournament in serie A and the last six did the same for the consolation group, serie B. Finally, in stage three (final four) the best four teams from serie A played in a round robin at four rounds for the title. The winners of the regular season and of the serie A are awarded a bonus point for the serie A and the final four, respectively.

== BAI Basket Participants (2009–10 Season) ==
Team	Home
ASA	Luanda
CDUAN	Luanda
Desportivo da Huíla	Lubango
Imbondeiro	Luanda
Interclube	Luanda
Petro Atlético	Luanda
Primeiro de Agosto	Luanda
PROMADE	Cabinda
Recreativo do Libolo	Luanda
Sporting de Luanda	Luanda
Universidade Lusíadas	Luanda
Vila Clotilde	Luanda

== Regular season (November 13, 2009 - March 30, 2010 ==
	ASA	CDU	HUI	IMB	INT	PET	PRI	PRO	LIB	SCL	LUS	VIL	Rec.
ASA							91-101		98-102		77-72		
CDUAN					55-93		87-134	57-131			88-84		
Desp. da Huíla				113-78			52-137					80-72	
Imbondeiro						37-141	54-173		42-137				
Interclube	115-124			111-61		101-113	90-108						
Petro Atlético	97-78						66-67	86-59	79-96		92-59	99-54	
Primeiro de Agosto	102-62	124-54	100-63	214-52	122-70	108-113		103-87	90-87	126-49	136-81	137-65	10–1
PROMADE		131-57	96-51		94-93		87-102		73-67				
Recreativo do Libolo					95-79	88-74	81-85	69-72				86-48	
Sporting de Luanda		76-87		106-73			70-95	47-63					
Universidade Lusíada							61-103	42-78					
Vila Clotilde	54-105			97-84			81-115						
Record							10–0						

Regular Season Standings

P	Team	Pts
1	Primeiro de Agosto	
2	Recreativo do Libolo	
4	Petro Atlético	
5	ASA	
6	PROMADE	
3	Interclube	
7	Universidade Lusíadas	
8	CDUAN	
9	Sporting de Luanda	
10	Vila Clotilde	
11	Desportivo da Huíla	
12	Imbondeiro de Viana	

As the regular season winner, Primeiro de Agosto is awarded a bonus point for the group stage.

== Group Stage (April 20–30, 2010) ==
Serie A

	ASA	INT	PET	PRI	PRO	LIB	Rec.
ASA		95-79			91-67		2–3
Interclube					101-73		1–4
Petro Atlético	86-63	93-90			71-62	83-91	3–2
Primeiro de Agosto	104-94	116-96	93-90		116-72	95-85	5–0
PROMADE							0–5
Recreativo do Libolo	91-79	100-92			85-61		4–1
Record							

Serie B

	CDU	HUI	IMB	LUS	SCL	VIL	Rec.
CDUAN							
Desp. da Huíla	20-0						
Imbondeiro							
Lusíadas			104-64		82-81	81-78	
SCL	66-56						
Vila Clotilde	112-104						
Record							

Serie A

P	Team	Pts
2	Primeiro de Agosto	
1	Recreativo do Libolo	
3	Petro Atlético	
5	ASA	
4	Interclube	
6	PROMADE	

As the group stage winner, Primeiro de Agosto is awarded a bonus point for the final four.

Serie B

P	Team	Pts
1	Universidade Lusíadas	
2	Sporting de Luanda	
3	CDUAN	
4	Vila Clotilde	
5	Desportivo da Huíla	
6	Imbondeiro de Viana	

== 5th–8th Place (May 18 - June 15, 2010) ==
	HUI	INT	LUS	PRO	Rec.
Desp. Huíla		82-90			
Interclube	91-72				
Lusíadas					
PROMADE					
Record					

== Final Four (May 18 - June 15, 2010) ==
	ASA	PET	PRI	LIB	ASA	PET	PRI	LIB	Rec.
ASA		93-97	78-86	64-73		72-82	70-80	70-93	0-6
Petro Atlético	82-64		99-101	62-80	80-93		88-95	83-87	1-5
Primeiro de Agosto	94-74	103-95		99-95	97-86	112-102		105-102	6-0
Recreativo do Libolo	83-70	70-84	113-89		95-81	84-71	87-93		4-2
Record					1-5	3-3	5-1	4-2	

- R. do Libolo vs. Petro Atlético

May 18, 2010
18:00 WAT

Report (in Portuguese)

R. do Libolo	70–84	Petro Atlético
Scoring by quarter: 22-25, 22-19, 13-18, 13-22
Pts: Olímpio 15		Pts: M.Porter 21

Pavilhão da Cidadela, Luanda

May 27, 2010
18:00 WAT

Report (in Portuguese)

Petro Atlético	62–80	R. do Libolo
Scoring by quarter: 21-26, 33-19, 8-18, 21-17
Pts: Mingas, B.Morais 10		Pts: R.Moore 16

Pavilhão da Cidadela, Luanda

June 3, 2010
19:00 WAT

Report (in Portuguese)

R. do Libolo	84–71	Petro Atlético
Pts: O.Peterkin 20		Pts: M.Porter 17

Pavilhão da Cidadela, Luanda

June 10, 2010
18:00 WAT

Report (in Portuguese)

Petro Atlético	87–83	R. do Libolo
Scoring by quarter: 26-24, 21-19, 20-22, 16-22
Pts: Mingas 20		Pts: L.Paulo 17

Pavilhão da Cidadela, Luanda

- 1º de Agosto vs. ASA

May 18, 2010
18:00 WAT

Report (in Portuguese)

1º de Agosto	94–74	ASA
Pts: A.Baza 23		Pts: F.Gonçalves 16

Pavilhão do CODENM, Luanda

May 27, 2010
18:00 WAT

Report (in Portuguese)

ASA	78–86	1º de Agosto
Scoring by quarter: 19-20, 11-19, 29-20, 19-27
Pts: Selengue, Nascimento 15		Pts: Lutonda 17

Pavilhão Anexo, Luanda

June 3, 2010
18:00 WAT

1º de Agosto	97–86	ASA

Pavilhão do CODENM, Luanda

June 10, 2010
18:00 WAT

Report (in Portuguese)

ASA	70–80	1º de Agosto
Scoring by quarter: 7-22, 27-16, 17-21, 19-21
Pts: Nascimento 20		Pts: Kikas 21

Pavilhão da Cidadela, Luanda

- 1º de Agosto vs. Petro Atlético

May 20, 2010
18:00 WAT

Report (in Portuguese)

1º de Agosto	103–95	Petro Atlético
Scoring by quarter: 24-19, 23-21, 22-21, 34-34
Pts: Kikas 32		Pts: Mingas 26

Pavilhão do CODENM, Luanda

May 29, 2010
19:00 WAT

Report (in Portuguese)

Petro Atlético	99–101	1º de Agosto
Scoring by quarter: 19-19, 23-30, 20-23, 37-29
Pts: D.Mbunga 17		Pts: Lutonda 21

Pavilhão da Cidadela, Luanda

June 5, 2010
18:00 WAT

Report (in Portuguese)

1º de Agosto	112–102	Petro Atlético
Scoring by quarter: 28-24, 26-24, 24-33, 34-21
Pts: M.Correia 26		Pts: P.Santana 26

Pavilhão do CODENM, Luanda

June 12, 2010
19:00 WAT

Report (in Portuguese)

Petro Atlético	88–95	1º de Agosto
Scoring by quarter: 26-20, 20-21, 13-31, 29-23
Pts: V.Pontes 16		Pts: Kikas 25

Pavilhão da Cidadela, Luanda

- ASA vs. R. do Libolo

May 20, 2010
18:00 WAT

ASA	64–73	R. do Libolo

Pavilhão Anexo, Luanda

May 29, 2010
18:00 WAT

R. do Libolo	83–70	ASA

Pavilhão da Cidadela, Luanda

June 5, 2010
18:00 WAT

ASA	70–93	R. do Libolo

Pavilhão Anexo, Luanda

June 12, 2010
16:00 WAT

R. do Libolo	95–81	ASA

Pavilhão da Cidadela, Luanda

- Petro Atlético vs. ASA

May 24, 2010
16:00 WAT

Petro Atlético	82–64	ASA

Pavilhão da Cidadela, Luanda

May 31, 2010
18:00 WAT

ASA	93–97	Petro Atlético

Pavilhão da Cidadela, Luanda

June 8, 2010
18:00 WAT

Petro Atlético	80–93	ASA

Pavilhão Anexo, Luanda

June 15, 2010
18:00 WAT

ASA	72–82	Petro Atlético

Pavilhão Anexo, Luanda

- R. do Libolo vs. 1º de Agosto

May 24, 2010
19:00 WAT

Report (in Portuguese)

R. do Libolo	113–89	1º de Agosto
Scoring by quarter: 29-21, 23-20, 30-25, 31-23
Pts: O.Peterkin 21		Pts: C.Almeida 16

Pavilhão da Cidadela, Luanda

May 31, 2010
19:00 WAT

Report (in Portuguese)

1º de Agosto	99–95	R. do Libolo
Scoring by quarter: 21-29, 26-13, 24-27, 28-26
Pts: M.Correia 29		Pts: C.Morais 22

Pavilhão do CODENM, Luanda

June 8, 2010
18:00 WAT

Report (in Portuguese)

R. do Libolo	87–93	1º de Agosto
Scoring by quarter: 27-23, 19-23, 29-26, 12-21
Pts: Olímpio 18		Pts: C.Almeida 20

Pavilhão da Cidadela, Luanda

June 15, 2010
18:00 WAT

Report (in Portuguese)

1º de Agosto	105–102	R. do Libolo
Scoring by quarter: 27-35, 28-16, 23-25, 27-26
Pts: Kikas 24		Pts: R.Moore 25

Pavilhão do CODENM, Luanda

== Final standings ==
P	Team	Pts
1	Primeiro de Agosto	24
2	Recreativo do Libolo	20
3	Petro Atlético	16
4	ASA	12

== Awards ==
2010 BAI Basket MVP

- (Angola) Kikas (Primeiro de Agosto)

2010 BAI Basket Top Scorer

- (United States) Reggie Moore (Recreativo do Libolo)

2010 BAI Basket Top Rebounder

- (Angola) Eduardo Mingas (Petro Atlético)

2010 BAI Basket Top Assists

- (Angola) Paulo Santana (Petro Atlético)

2010 BAI Basket

Clube Desportivo Primeiro de Agosto
16th Title

Most Valuable Player
(Angola) Kikas

== See also ==
- 2010 Angola Basketball Cup
- 2010 Angola Basketball Super Cup
- 2010 Victorino Cunha Cup
