= 2008–09 BAI Basket =

BAI Basket 2008–09
- League: BAI Basket
- Sport: Basketball
- Duration: November 20, 2008 – May 16, 2009
- Teams: 12
- TV partner: TPA1 (Angola) TPA Internacional (Worldwide) Supersport (Africa)

BAI Basket season
- Champions: Primeiro de Agosto

BAI Basket seasons
- ← 2007–08 2009–10 →

The 2008–09 Season of BAI Basket (31st edition) ran from November 20, 2008 through May 16, 2009, with 12 teams playing in three different stages: in stage one (regular season) teams played a double round robin system. In stage two, the six best teams played a single round robin tournament in serie A and the last six did the same for the consolation group, serie B. Finally, in stage three (final four) the best four teams from serie A played in a round robin at four rounds for the title. The winners of the regular season and of the serie A are awarded a bonus point for the serie A and the final four, respectively.

== BAI Basket Participants (2008–09 Season) ==
Team	Home
ASA	Luanda
CDUAN	Luanda
Desportivo da Huíla	Lubango
Imbondeiro	Luanda
Interclube	Luanda
Petro Atlético	Luanda
Primeiro de Agosto	Luanda
PROMADE	Cabinda
Recreativo do Libolo	Luanda
Sporting de Luanda	Luanda
Universidade Lusíadas	Luanda
Vila Clotilde	Luanda

== Regular season (November 20, 2008 - March 09, 2009 ==
	ASA	CDU	HUI	IMB	INT	PET	PRI	PRO	LIB	SCL	LUS	VIL	Rec.
ASA		76-58			62-48	86-87	75-89	73-84	86-82	87-73	103-70; 30 Jan (17)		
CDUAN	72-117		- 13 Feb (?)	115-68		67-95	55-118	70-64; 30 Jan (17)				89-51- 06 Dec (6)	
Desp. da Huíla	91-101				72-94; 05 Dec (5)	- 06 Dec (6)	59-137				89-70	68-64	
Imbondeiro	58-121				62-124; 31 Jan (?)		69-216		61-126	49-102		89-61; 30 Jan (17)	
Interclube	- 13 Feb (?)	96-93	100-99; 30 Jan (17)			83-78	62-88- 06 Dec (6)	70-71	80-82		87-63	101-52	
Petro Atlético	74-81		95-60	142-72	74-54		74-93; 13 Feb (?)	89-83; 31 Jan (?)	54–73; 30 Jan (17)	108-55	126-59	119-40	
Primeiro de Agosto	128-69; 31 Jan (?)	108-49	124-59	204-23	101-70	82-94; 02 Dec (?)		103-62	108-79	143-68; 30 Jan (17)	130-68	126-65	
PROMADE	102-98	? 05 Dec (5)			91-84	75-103	58-101		66-79; 16 Jan (?)	87-53- 06 Dec (6)	93-68		
Recreativo do Libolo	97-96- 06 Dec (6)	67-61	93-80		86-70	71-78; 05 Dec (5)	86-81	- 13 Feb (?)			89-45	- 31 Jan (?)	
Sporting de Luanda	55-77	87-64; 31 Jan (?)		- 13 Feb (?)		49-91	59-139; 04 Dec (5)		41-81				
Universidade Lusíada	45-79; 05 Dec (5)	98-95	- 31 Jan (?)	78-52- 06 Dec (6)			66-116		47-93	72-85		- 13 Feb (?)	
Vila Clotilde			74-77	35-48; 05 Dec (5)		57-119	56-136				52-86		
Record													

The home team is listed on the left-hand column.
The rightmost column and the bottom row list the teams' home and away records respectively.

Regular Season Standings

P	Team	M	W	L	PF	PA	D	Pts
1	Primeiro de Agosto	22	20	2	2492	1611	+881	42
2	Recreativo do Libolo	22	19	3	1915	1461	+454	41
3	Petro Atlético	22	18	4	2155	1479	+676	40
4	ASA	22	16	6	1961	1572	+389	38
5	PROMADE	22	14	8	1674	1652	+22	36
6	Interclube	22	13	9	1848	1612	+236	35
7	CDUAN	22	10	12	1600	1697	-97	32
8	Desportivo da Huíla	22	9	13	1586	1775	-189	31
9	Universidade Lusíadas	22	6	16	1531	1949	-418	28
10	Sporting de Luanda	22	3	19	1431	1852	-421	25
11	Vila Clotilde	22	3	19	1266	1971	-705	25
12	Imbondeiro de Viana	22	1	21	1180	2460	-1280	23

== Group Stage (March 20 – April 3, 2009) ==
Serie A

	ASA	INT	PET	PRI	PRO	LIB	Rec.
ASA		- 21 Mar (2)					
Interclube	67-83						
Petro Atlético	83-88; 20 Mar (1)	100-60			97-55; 27 Mar (3)		
Primeiro de Agosto	108-65; 27 Mar (3)	100-67; 20 Mar (1)	85-90; 28 Mar (4)		120-73; 21 Mar (2)	98-90	
PROMADE		- 28 Mar (4)					
Recreativo do Libolo	- 28 Mar (4)	- 27 Mar (3)	66-69; 21 Mar (2)		97-41; 20 Mar (1)		
Record							

Serie B

	CDU	HUI	IMB	LUS	SCL	VIL	Rec.
CDUAN			103-51; 20 Mar (1)	- 28 Mar (4)	- 21 Mar (2)	- 27 Mar (3)	
Desp. da Huíla			- 27 Mar (3)	- 21 Mar (2)	20-0; 20 Mar (1)	- 28 Mar (4)	
Imbondeiro							
Lusíadas					- 27 Mar (3)	86-65; 20 Mar (1)	
SCL			- 28 Mar (4)				
Vila Clotilde			- 21 Mar (2)				
Record							

The home team is listed on the left-hand column.
The rightmost column and the bottom row list the teams' home and away records respectively.

Serie A

P	Team	Pts
2	Petro Atlético	9
1	Primeiro de Agosto	9
3	Recreativo do Libolo	8
4	ASA	7
5	PROMADE	6
6	Interclube	5

Serie B

P	Team	Pts
1	Universidade Lusíadas	
2	Desportivo da Huíla	12
3	Sporting de Luanda	
4	CDUAN	
5	Vila Clotilde	
6	Imbondeiro de Viana	

== Final Four (April 21 - May 16, 2009) ==
	ASA	ASA	PET	PET	PRI	PRI	LIB	LIB	Rec.
ASA			99-83; 28 Apr (4)	79-95; 12 May 10	96-111; 24 Apr (2)	99-104; 08 May (8)	97-80; 02 May (6)	79-76; 16 May 12	
Petro Atlético	89-78; 21 Apr (1)	81-74; 05 May (7)			87-97; 02 May (6)	85-80; 16 May 12	82-75; 30 Apr (5)	? 15 May 11	1-5
Primeiro de Agosto	123-98; 30 Apr (5)	? 15 May 11	86-71; 25 Apr (3)	93-79; 09 May (9)			107–97; 21 Apr (1)	88-80; 05 May (7)	6-0
Recreativo do Libolo	80-87; 25 Apr (3)	? 09 May (9)	88-67; 24 Apr (2)	92-88; 08 May (8)	80-90; 28 Apr (4)	92-116; 12 May 10			4-2
Record									

- 1º de Agosto vs. R. do Libolo

April 21, 2009
18:00 WAT

1º de Agosto	107–97	R. do Libolo
Scoring by quarter: 29-17, 25-28, 29-28, 24-25

Pavilhão da Cidadela, Luanda

April 28, 2009
18:00 WAT

R. do Libolo	80–90	1º de Agosto
Scoring by quarter: 17-19, 18-16, 25-35, 20-20

Pavilhão da Cidadela, Luanda

May 5, 2009
18:00 WAT

Report (in Portuguese)

1º de Agosto	88–80	R. do Libolo
Scoring by quarter: 18-29, 26-12, 16-14, 28-25
Pts: A.Costa 20		Pts: Bonifácio 18

Pavilhão da Cidadela, Luanda

May 12, 2009
19:00 WAT

Report (in Portuguese)

R. do Libolo	92–116	1º de Agosto
Scoring by quarter: 25-27, 26-31, 23-30, 18-28
Pts: Olímpio 24		Pts: R.Moore 23

Pavilhão da Cidadela, Luanda

- Petro Atlético vs. ASA

April 21, 2009
18:00 WAT

Petro Atlético	89–78	ASA

Pavilhão da Cidadela, Luanda

April 28, 2009
18:00 WAT

ASA	99–83	Petro Atlético

Pavilhão Anexo, Luanda

May 5, 2009
18:00 WAT

Petro Atlético	81–74	ASA

Pavilhão da Cidadela, Luanda

May 12, 2009
18:00 WAT

Report (in Portuguese)

ASA	79–95	Petro Atlético
Scoring by quarter: 26-18, 19-27, 21-24, 13-26
Pts: L.Wilkins 20		Pts: Mingas 26

Pavilhão Anexo, Luanda

- R. do Libolo vs. Petro Atlético

April 24, 2009
18:00 WAT

Report (in Portuguese)

R. do Libolo	88–67	Petro Atlético
Scoring by quarter: 24-19, 23-21, 22-21, 34-34
Pts: L.Costa, Joseph 17		Pts: F.Gentry 15

Pavilhão da Cidadela, Luanda

April 30, 2009
18:00 WAT

Petro Atlético	82–75	R. do Libolo

Pavilhão da Cidadela, Luanda

May 8, 2009
18:00 WAT

Report (in Portuguese)

R. do Libolo	92–88	Petro Atlético

Pavilhão da Cidadela, Luanda

May 15, 2009
16:00 WAT

Petro Atlético	vs.	R. do Libolo

Pavilhão do CODENM, Luanda

- ASA vs. 1º de Agosto

April 24, 2009
19:00 WAT

ASA	96–111	1º de Agosto
Scoring by quarter: 26-32, 21-20, 28-36, 21-23

Pavilhão Anexo, Luanda

April 30, 2009
18:00 WAT

1º de Agosto	123–98	ASA
Scoring by quarter: 34-24, 27-30, 38-21, 24-23

Pavilhão Cidadela, Luanda

May 8, 2009
18:00 WAT

ASA	99–104	1º de Agosto
Scoring by quarter: 27-28, 16-23, 31-22, 25-31
Pts: Kiteculo 29		Pts: C.Almeida 19

Pavilhão Anexo, Luanda

May 15, 2009
19:00 WAT

1º de Agosto	vs.	ASA

Pavilhão do CODENM, Luanda

- R. do Libolo vs. ASA

April 25, 2009
16:00 WAT

R. do Libolo	80–87	ASA

Pavilhão da Cidadela, Luanda

May 2, 2009
18:00 WAT

ASA	97–80	R. do Libolo

Pavilhão Anexo, Luanda

May 9, 2009
18:00 WAT

R. do Libolo	vs.	ASA

Pavilhão da Cidadela, Luanda

May 16, 2009
18:00 WAT

Report (in Portuguese)

ASA	79–76	R. do Libolo
Pts: A.Quimbamba 23		Pts: L.Paulo 22

Pavilhão Anexo, Luanda

- 1º de Agosto vs. Petro Atlético

April 25, 2009
19:00 WAT

Report (in Portuguese)

1º de Agosto	86–71	Petro Atlético
Scoring by quarter: 23-15, 23-15, 18-28, 22-13
Pts: Olímpio, Kikas 16		Pts: H.Evans 17

Pavilhão do CODENM, Luanda

May 2, 2009
19:00 WAT

Report (in Portuguese)

Petro Atlético	87–97	1º de Agosto
Scoring by quarter: 16-30, 27-22, 25-24, 19-21
Pts: H.Evans 27		Pts: C.Almeida 22

Pavilhão da Cidadela, Luanda

May 9, 2009
18:00 WAT

Report (in Portuguese)

1º de Agosto	93–79	Petro Atlético
Scoring by quarter: 28-18, 25-20, 19-28, 21-13
Pts: C.Almeida 16		Pts: H.Evans 13

Pavilhão do CODENM, Luanda

May 16, 2009
18:00 WAT

Report (in Portuguese)

Petro Atlético	85–80	1º de Agosto
Scoring by quarter: 27-35, 28-16, 23-25, 27-26
Pts: H.Evans 24		Pts: Olímpio 19

Pavilhão da Cidadela, Luanda

== Final standings ==
=== Group A ===
P	Team	Pts
1	Primeiro de Agosto	42
2	Petro Atlético	41
3	ASA	40
4	Recreativo do Libolo	38

=== Group B ===
P	Team	M	W	L	PF	PA	D	Pts
5	Interclube	12	10	2	1040	991	+49	22
6	PROMADE - Misto de Cabinda	12			942	833	+109	20
7	Desportivo da Huíla	12	5	7	778	774	+4	17
8	CDUAN	12			610	902	-292	11

=== Group C ===
P	Team	M	W	L	PF	PA	D	Pts
9	Lusíada	12	11	1	1146	903	+243	23
10	Sporting de Luanda	12			940	916	+24	18
11	Vila Clotilde	12			871	962	-91	16
12	Imbondeiro de Viana	12			837	1051	-214	13

== Awards ==
2009 BAI Basket MVP

2009 BAI Basket Top Scorer

2009 BAI Basket Top Rebounder

2009 BAI Basket Top Assists

2009 BAI Basket
Clube Desportivo Primeiro de Agosto
15th Title

Most Valuable Player

== See also ==
- 2009 Angola Basketball Cup
- 2009 Angola Basketball Super Cup
- 2009 Victorino Cunha Cup
