= 2007–08 BAI Basket =

Sports season

BAI Basket 2007–08
- League: BAI Basket
- Sport: Basketball
- Duration: November 21, 2008 – May 16, 2009
- Teams: 12
- TV partner: TPA1 (Angola) TPA Internacional (Worldwide) Supersport (Africa)

BAI Basket season
- Champions: Primeiro de Agosto
- Season MVP: (Angola) Olímpio Cipriano

BAI Basket seasons
- ← 2006–07 2008–09 →

The 2007–08 Season of BAI Basket (30th edition) ran from November 21, 2008 through May 16, 2009, with 12 teams playing in three different stages In stage one (regular season) teams played a double round robin system. In stage two, the six best teams played a single round robin tournament in serie A and the last six did the same for the consolation group, serie B. Finally, in stage three (final four) the best four teams from serie A played in a round robin at four rounds for the title. The winners of the regular season and of the serie A are awarded a bonus point for the serie A and the final four, respectively.

== BAI Basket Participants (2007–08 Season) ==
Team	Home
ASA	Luanda
União da Catumbela	Benguela
CDUAN	Luanda
Desportivo da Huíla	Lubango
Desportivo da Nocal	Luanda
Imbondeiro	Luanda
Interclube	Luanda
Petro Atlético	Luanda
Primeiro de Agosto	Luanda
PROMADE	Luanda
Sporting de Luanda	Luanda
Universidade Lusíadas	Luanda
Vila Clotilde	Luanda

== Regular Season (January 25, 2008 - March 09, 2008 ==
	ASA	CDU	HUI	IMB	INT	LUS	NOC	PET	PRI	PRO	SCL	UNI	VIL	Rec.
ASA			-	100–42; 02 Feb (4)	-	-	– 01 Feb (3)	-	-	-	– 15 Feb (7)	-	-	
CDUAN	62–89; 19 Feb (10)	-		-	-	-	-	-	-	-	-	- 01 Feb (3)	-	
Desp Huíla	-	-		-	-	-	-	71-98; 29 Mar (19)	- 21 Mar (4)	88–80; 14 Mar (15)	– 31 Mar (16)	-	-	
Imbondeiro	-		-	-			-	-	-	-	-	-	-	
Interclube	-		-	-		– 19 Feb (10)	-	-	-	-	-		– 14 Mar (15)	
Universidade Lusíada	-		-	-	-		-	-	-	-	– 14 Mar (15)		-	
Desp da Nocal	– 14 Mar (15)		-	-	-			-	-	-	-	-	64–70; 02 Feb (4)	
Petro Atlético	-	99–69; 02 Feb (4)	– 15 Feb (7)	-	– 16 Feb (8)		– 19 Feb (10)		91–101; 14 Mar (15)	-	-	-	-	
Primeiro de Agosto	– 16 Feb (8)		112-82; 30 Mar (16)	– 15 Feb (7)	-	102–72; 02 Feb (4)	-	76–66; 01 Feb (3)		-	-		– 19 Feb (10)	
PROMADE	-		- 01 Feb (3)	-	72–88; 02 Feb (4)		-	-	-		-	-	– 15 Feb (7)	
Sporting de Luanda	-		52–58; 02 Feb (4)	-	-	– 01 Feb (3)	-	-	-	54–102; 19 Feb (10)			-	
União da Catumbela	-	– 14 Mar (15)	-	– 19 Feb (10)	48–81; 14 Feb (?)	70–83; 07 Feb (?)	-	56–122; 06 Feb (2)	-	-	-		-	
Vila Clotilde	-		-	-	– 01 Feb (3)		-	-	-	-	-	-		
Record														

Regular Season Standings

P	Team	Pts
1	Primeiro de Agosto	
2	Recreativo do Libolo	
4	Petro Atlético	
5	ASA	
6	PROMADE	
3	Interclube	
7	Universidade Lusíadas	
8	CDUAN	
9	Sporting de Luanda	
10	Vila Clotilde	
11	Desportivo da Huíla	
12	Imbondeiro de Viana	

== Final Four (April 21 - May 16, 2008) ==
	ASA	PET	PRI	PRO	Rec.
ASA					
Petro Atlético					-
Primeiro de Agosto		86–78; 04 Jun (3)			-
PROMADE					-
Record					

- 1º de Agosto vs. R. do Libolo

April 21, 2009
18:00 WAT

1º de Agosto	107–97	R. do Libolo

Pavilhão da Cidadela, Luanda

April 28, 2009
18:00 WAT

R. do Libolo	80–90	1º de Agosto

Pavilhão da Cidadela, Luanda

May 5, 2009
18:00 WAT

Report (in Portuguese)

1º de Agosto	88–80	R. do Libolo
Scoring by quarter: 18-29, 26-12, 16-14, 28-25
Pts: A.Costa 20		Pts: Bonifácio 18

Pavilhão da Cidadela, Luanda

May 12, 2009
19:00 WAT

Report (in Portuguese)

R. do Libolo	92–116	1º de Agosto
Pts: Olímpio 24		Pts: R.Moore 23

Pavilhão da Cidadela, Luanda

- Petro Atlético vs. ASA

April 21, 2009
18:00 WAT

Petro Atlético	89–78	ASA

Pavilhão da Cidadela, Luanda

April 28, 2009
18:00 WAT

ASA	99–83	Petro Atlético

Pavilhão Anexo, Luanda

May 5, 2009
18:00 WAT

Petro Atlético	81–74	ASA

Pavilhão da Cidadela, Luanda

May 12, 2009
18:00 WAT

Report (in Portuguese)

ASA	79–95	Petro Atlético
Scoring by quarter: 26-18, 19-27, 21-24, 13-26
Pts: L.Wilkins 20		Pts: Mingas 26

Pavilhão Anexo, Luanda

- R. do Libolo vs. Petro Atlético

April 24, 2009
18:00 WAT

Report (in Portuguese)

R. do Libolo	88–67	Petro Atlético
Scoring by quarter: 24-19, 23-21, 22-21, 34-34
Pts: L.Costa, Joseph 17		Pts: F.Gentry 15

Pavilhão da Cidadela, Luanda

April 30, 2009
18:00 WAT

Petro Atlético	82–75	R. do Libolo

Pavilhão da Cidadela, Luanda

May 8, 2009
18:00 WAT

Report (in Portuguese)

R. do Libolo	92–88	Petro Atlético

Pavilhão da Cidadela, Luanda

May 15, 2009
16:00 WAT

Petro Atlético	vs.	R. do Libolo

Pavilhão do CODENM, Luanda

- ASA vs. 1º de Agosto

April 24, 2009
19:00 WAT

ASA	96–111	1º de Agosto

Pavilhão Anexo, Luanda

April 30, 2009
18:00 WAT

1º de Agosto	123–98	ASA

Pavilhão Cidadela, Luanda

May 8, 2009
18:00 WAT

ASA	99–104	1º de Agosto

Pavilhão Anexo, Luanda

May 15, 2009
19:00 WAT

1º de Agosto	vs.	ASA

Pavilhão do CODENM, Luanda

- R. do Libolo vs. ASA

April 25, 2009
16:00 WAT

R. do Libolo	80–87	ASA

Pavilhão da Cidadela, Luanda

May 2, 2009
18:00 WAT

ASA	97–80	R. do Libolo

Pavilhão Anexo, Luanda

May 9, 2009
18:00 WAT

R. do Libolo	vs.	ASA

Pavilhão da Cidadela, Luanda

May 16, 2009
18:00 WAT

Report (in Portuguese)

ASA	79–76	R. do Libolo
Pts: A.Quimbamba 23		Pts: L.Paulo 22

Pavilhão Anexo, Luanda

- 1º de Agosto vs. Petro Atlético

April 25, 2009
19:00 WAT

Report (in Portuguese)

1º de Agosto	86–71	Petro Atlético
Scoring by quarter: 23-15, 23-30, 18-28, 22-13
Pts: Olímpio, Kikas 16		Pts: H.Evans 17

Pavilhão do CODENM, Luanda

May 2, 2009
19:00 WAT

Report (in Portuguese)

Petro Atlético	87–97	1º de Agosto
Scoring by quarter: 16-30, 27-22, 25-24, 19-21
Pts: H.Evans 27		Pts: C.Almeida 22

Pavilhão da Cidadela, Luanda

May 9, 2009
18:00 WAT

Report (in Portuguese)

1º de Agosto	93–79	Petro Atlético
Scoring by quarter: 28-18, 25-20, 19-28, 21-13
Pts: C.Almeida 16		Pts: H.Evans 13

Pavilhão do CODENM, Luanda

May 16, 2009
18:00 WAT

Report (in Portuguese)

Petro Atlético	85–80	1º de Agosto
Scoring by quarter: 27-35, 28-16, 23-25, 27-26
Pts: H.Evans 24		Pts: Olímpio 19

Pavilhão da Cidadela, Luanda

== Final standings ==
P	Team	Pts
1	Primeiro de Agosto	42
2	Recreativo do Libolo	41
3	Petro Atlético	40
4	ASA	38
5	PROMADE - Misto de Cabinda	36
6	Interclube	35
7	CDUAN	31
8	Desportivo da Huíla	31
9	Lusíada	28
10	Vila Clotilde	25
11	Sporting de Luanda	25
12	Imbondeiro de Viana	22

== Awards ==
2008 BAI Basket MVP

- (Angola) Olímpio Cipriano (PRI)

2008 BAI Basket Top Scorer

- (Angola) Olímpio Cipriano (PRI)

2008 BAI Basket Top Rebounder

- (Angola) Kikas (PRI)

2008 BAI Basket Top Assists

- (Angola) Armando Costa (PRI)

2008 BAI Basket
Clube Desportivo Primeiro de Agosto
15th title

Most Valuable Player
(Angola) Olímpio Cipriano

== See also ==
- 2008 Angola Basketball Cup
- 2008 Angola Basketball Super Cup
- Federação Angolana de Basquetebol
