= 2011–12 BAI Basket =

BAI Basket 2011–12
- League: BAI Basket
- Sport: Basketball
- Duration: November 25, 2011 – May 17, 2012
- Teams: 12
- TV partner: TPA1 (Angola) TPA Internacional (Worldwide) Supersport (Africa)

BAI Basket season
- Champions: Recreativo do Libolo
- Season MVP: (Angola) Olímpio Cipriano

BAI Basket seasons
- ← 2010–11 2012–13 →

The 2011–12 season of BAI Basket (34th edition) ran from November 25, 2011 through May 17, 2012, with 12 teams playing the regular season in a double round robin system. The tournament was cut short due to the Angolan national team's engagement at the Olympics qualification tournament and also due to a strike of referees, in that at the end of the regular season, the best six teams played a double round robin tournament for the title in serie A as did the last six teams for the consolation, serie B.

== BAI Basket Participants (2011–12 Season) ==
Team	Home
Amigos de Viana	Luanda
ASA	Luanda
CDUAN	Luanda
Interclube	Luanda
Petro Atlético	Luanda
Primeiro de Agosto	Luanda
Recreativo do Libolo	Luanda
Santos FC	Luanda
Sporting de Luanda	Luanda
Sporting de Cabinda	Cabinda
Universidade Lusíada	Luanda
Vila Clotilde	Luanda
Vila Estoril	Luanda

== Regular Season (November 25, 2011 - March 30, 2012) ==
	VIA	ASA	CDU	INT	PET	PRI	LIB	SCC	SCL	LUS	VIL	EST	Rec.
VIA									20-0	79-68	20-0		
ASA	134-45		92-81			86-95			109-60	79-68	112-57	103–57; 25 Nov ?	
CDUAN	– 7(1)				57-90	53-109			69-68			– 25 Nov 1(1)	
Interclube	140-39	68-66; 25 Nov 1(1)	75-64		74-69	78-94	77-71		82-81		83-70		
Petro Atlético	129-52	59-55	96-45			100-104	79-69; 1(1)	76-49				90-69	
Primeiro de Agosto	160-52		95-58	79-63	87-75; 7(1)		71-80	95-67					
Recreativo do Libolo	147-39	95-76	94-71	92-81	94-88	90-98		68-50					
Sporting de Cabinda				54-71			– 7(1)					57-52	
Sporting de Luanda	115-56				63-89					45-69			
Universidade Lusíada					77-99	69-109	73-90				80-57	79-67	
Vila Clotilde		65-89		86-127; 7(1)	81-103	86-127	50-94	71-73	– 25 Nov 1(1)			68-74	
Vila Estoril	92-56	82–95; 1(2)	79-82						77-73	– 7(1)			
Record													

Regular Season Standings

P	Team	Pts
1	Primeiro de Agosto	
2	Recreativo do Libolo	
3	Interclube	
4	Petro Atlético	
5	ASA	
6	Sporting de Cabinda	
7	Universidade Lusíadas	
8	CDUAN	
9	Sporting de Luanda	
10	Vila Clotilde	
11	Vila Estoril	
12	Amigos de Viana	

As the regular season winner, Primeiro de Agosto is awarded a bonus point for the Final Four.

== Final Phase (April 26 - May 22) ==
Serie A

	ASA	INT	PET	PRI	LIB	SCC	Rec.
ASA		73-78	89-94	70-81	84-89	91-73	1-4
Interclube	77-69		78-89	79-71	80-87	72-68	3-2
Petro Atlético	98-90	67-51		79-82	78-93	87-80	3-2
Primeiro de Agosto	103-64	100-67	85-84		83-91	20-0	4-1
Rec do Libolo	92-111	90-57	81-73	91-82		84-65	4-1
Sporting Cabinda		69-83	67-102	71-86			
Record		2-3	3-2	3-2		0-5	

Serie B

	VIA	CDU	SCL	LUS	VIL	EST	Rec.
Amigos de Viana							
CDUAN							
Sporting Luanda				72-87			
Lusíadas	156-54						
Vila Clotilde							
Vila Estoril							
Record							

The home team is listed on the left-hand column.
The rightmost column and the bottom row list the teams' home and away records respectively.

- Interclube vs. Petro Atlético

April 26, 2012
18:00 WAT

Report (in Portuguese)

Interclube	78–89	Petro Atlético
Scoring by quarter: 23-27, 12-20, 5-12, 38-30
Pts: A.Câmara 13		Pts: C.Morais 19

Pavilhão 28 de Fevereiro, Luanda

May 8, 2012
18:00 WAT

Report (in Portuguese)

Petro Atlético	67–51	Interclube
Pts: C.Morais 16		Pts: Mingas 16

Pavilhão da Cidadela, Luanda

- 1º de Agosto vs. Sp de Cabinda

April 26, 2012
18:00 WAT

1º de Agosto	20–0	Sp de Cabinda

Pavilhão do CODENM, Luanda

May 8, 2012
18:00 WAT

Sp de Cabinda	71–86	1º de Agosto

Pavilhão do Tafe, Cabinda

- ASA vs. R. do Libolo

April 26, 2012
18:00 WAT

ASA	84–89	R. do Libolo

Pavilhão Anexo, Luanda

May 8, 2012
18:30 WAT

R. do Libolo	111–92	ASA

Pavilhão Anexo, Luanda

- ASA vs. 1º de Agosto

April 27, 2012
18:00 WAT

ASA	70–81	1º de Agosto

Pavilhão Anexo, Luanda

May 10, 2012
18:30 WAT

1º de Agosto	103–64	ASA

Pavilhão do CODENM, Luanda

- Sp de Cabinda vs. Petro Atlético

April 27, 2012
18:00 WAT

Sp de Cabinda	67–102	Petro Atlético

Pavilhão do Tafe, Cabinda

May 10, 2012
18:00 WAT

Petro Atlético	87–80	Sp de Cabinda

Pavilhão da Cidadela, Luanda

- R. do Libolo vs. Interclube

April 27, 2012
18:00 WAT

Report (in Portuguese)

R. do Libolo	90–57	Interclube
Scoring by quarter: 25-12, 17-26, 24-14, 24-15
Pts: Olímpio 21		Pts: E.Ventura 14

Pavilhão da Cidadela, Luanda

May 10, 2012
18:00 WAT

Report (in Portuguese)

Interclube	80–87	R. do Libolo
Scoring by quarter: 25-22, 18-16
Pts: Mingas, Goffney 19		Pts: Olímpio 28

Pavilhão 28 de Fevereiro, Luanda

- 1º de Agosto vs. Petro Atlético

April 30, 2012
18:00 WAT

Report (in Portuguese)

1º de Agosto	85–84	Petro Atlético
Scoring by quarter: 22-21, 26-21, 22-24, 15-20
Pts: C.Almeida 17		Pts: R.Nealy 25

Pavilhão do CODENM, Luanda

May 12, 2012
18:00 WAT

Report (in Portuguese)

Petro Atlético	79–82	1º de Agosto
Scoring by quarter: 26-17, 11-16, 21-23, 21-26
Pts: R.Nealy 22		Pts: R.Moore 22

Pavilhão da Cidadela, Luanda

- ASA vs. Interclube

April 30, 2012
18:00 WAT

Report (in Portuguese)

ASA	73–78	Interclube
Scoring by quarter: 24-22, 14-17
Pts: V.Estevão 11		Pts: K.Goffney 27

Pavilhão Anexo 2, Luanda
Referees: Fernando Pacheco, David Manuel, Deidre Fiqueira

May 12, 2012
18:00 WAT

Interclube	77–69	ASA

Pavilhão 28 de Fevereiro, Luanda

- Sp de Cabinda vs. R. do Libolo

April 30, 2012
18:00 WAT

Sp de Cabinda	vs.	R. do Libolo

Pavilhão do Tafe, Cabinda

May 12, 2012
18:00 WAT

R. do Libolo	84–65	Sp de Cabinda

Pavilhão da Cidadela, Luanda

- Petro Atlético vs. R. do Libolo

May 5, 2012
18:00 WAT

Report (in Portuguese)

Petro Atlético	78–93	R. do Libolo
Pts: A.Gomes, C.Isom 15		Pts: Olímpio 33

Pavilhão da Cidadela, Luanda
Referees: Fernando Pacheco, Clésio Francisco, Isaías Luamba

May 15, 2012
18:00 WAT

R. do Libolo	81–73	Petro Atlético

Pavilhão da Cidadela, Luanda

- ASA vs. Sp de Cabinda

May 3, 2012
18:00 WAT

ASA	91–73	Sp de Cabinda

Pavilhão Anexo, Luanda

May 15, 2012
18:00 WAT

Sp de Cabinda	vs.	ASA

Pavilhão do Tafe, Cabinda

- Interclube vs. Sp de Cabinda

May 5, 2012
18:00 WAT

Interclube	72–68	Sp de Cabinda

Pavilhão 28 de Fevereiro, Luanda

May 17, 2012
18:00 WAT

Sp de Cabinda	69–83	Interclube

Pavilhão do Tafe, Cabinda

- Petro Atlético vs. ASA

May 5, 2012
18:00 WAT

Petro Atlético	98–90	ASA

Pavilhão da Cidadela, Luanda

May 17, 2012
18:00 WAT

ASA	89–94	Petro Atlético

Pavilhão Anexo, Luanda

- 1º de Agosto vs. R. do Libolo

May 5, 2012
18:00 WAT

1º de Agosto	83–91	R. do Libolo
Scoring by quarter: 23-12, 8-22
		Pts: Olímpio 20

Pavilhão do CODENM, Luanda

May 17, 2012
18:00 WAT

Report (in Portuguese)

R. do Libolo	91–82	1º de Agosto
Scoring by quarter: 18-27, 25-11, 20-19, 28-25
Pts: Mayzer 22		Pts: R.Moore 32

Pavilhão da Cidadela, Luanda

== Final standings ==
Serie A

P	Team	Pts
1	Recreativo do Libolo	
2	Primeiro de Agosto	
3	Petro Atlético	
4	Interclube	
5	ASA	
6	Sporting de Cabinda	

Serie B

P	Team	Pts
1	Universidade Lusíadas	
2	Sporting de Luanda	
3	CDUAN	
4	Vila Clotilde	
5	Vila Estoril	
6	Amigos de Viana	

== Awards ==
2012 BAI Basket MVP

- (Angola) Olímpio Cipriano (Recreativo do Libolo)

2012 BAI Basket Top Scorer

- (Angola) Olímpio Cipriano (Recreativo do Libolo)

2012 BAI Basket Top Rebounder

- (Angola) Hermenegildo Mbunga (Petro Atlético)

2012 BAI Basket Top Assists

- (Angola) Armando Costa (Primeiro de Agosto)

2012 BAI Basket

Clube Recreativo Desportivo do Libolo
1st title

Most Valuable Player
(Angola) Olímpio Cipriano

== See also ==
- 2012 Angola Basketball Cup
- 2012 Angola Basketball Super Cup
- 2012 Victorino Cunha Cup
