= 2012–13 BAI Basket =

BAI Basket 2012–13
- League: BAI Basket
- Sport: Basketball
- Duration: November 16, 2012 – May 21, 2013
- Teams: 10
- TV partner: TPA1 (Angola) TPA Internacional (Worldwide) Supersport (Africa)

BAI Basket season 2012–2013
- Champion: Primeiro de Agosto
- Season MVP: (United States) Cedric Isom

BAI Basket seasons
- ← 2011–12 2013–14 →

The 2012–13 season (35th edition) of BAI Basket kicked off on November 16, 2012, with 10 teams playing the regular season in a double round robin system. The 5 best teams qualified for group A and the last five, group B in an intermediate stage, in which each group will play in a double round robin, at the end of which the best four teams of group A are playing the final four for the title in a round robin system at four rounds. The relegated team from group A in the intermediate stage joined the best three teams of group B from the intermediate stage to play for the 5th-8th place classification whereas the last two teams will play for the last two.

Primeiro de Agosto won the championship after finishing the final four with a 9–3 record.

== BAI Basket Participants (2012–13 Season) ==
Team	Home
Amigos de Viana	Luanda
ASA	Luanda
CDUAN	Luanda
Interclube	Luanda
Petro Atlético	Luanda
Primeiro de Agosto	Luanda
Progresso	Luanda
Recreativo do Libolo	Luanda
Universidade Lusíada	Luanda
Vila Clotilde	Luanda

== Regular season (November 16, 2012 - February 16, 2013) ==
	VIA	ASA	CDU	INT	PET	PRI	PRO	LIB	LUS	VIL	Rec.
Amigos de Viana		0-20; 09/02/13	47-122				60-105; 08/02/13				
ASA			70-59; 15/02/13		78-98		- 01/12/12		0-20	- 30/11/12	
CDUAN	101-65			58-89; 09/02/13						68-97; 08/02/13	
Interclube		88-74; 08/02/13						88-85			
Petro Atlético	103-27			96-101; 05/01/13		99-81; 09/01/13		103-96; 09/02/13		107-70	
Primeiro de Agosto	114–50; 7 Sep ?(?)		108-62	102-98; 15/02/13	81-82; 08/02/13		117-85	84-82; 05/01/13		101-86; 09/02/13	
Progresso			57-62		95-105; 15/02/13					83-75	
Recreativo do Libolo				91-78	97-93	77-90	102-83		79-69; 08/02/13	114-62	
Universidade Lusíada	135-64; 15/02/13	70-73	- 30/11/12	77-86			74-62; 09/02/13			83-85	
Vila Clotilde				- 01/12/12			99-77	84-114; 15/02/13			
Record											

Serie A

Team	Pts
Petro Atlético	34
Interclube	33
Primeiro de Agosto	32
Recreativo do Libolo	28
ASA	28

As the group winner, Petro Atlético is awarded a bonus point for the group stage.

Serie B

Team	Pts
Universidade Lusíada	27
Progresso	26
Vila Clotilde	26
CDUAN	20
Amigos de viana	18

== Group Stage (February 22 - April 12, 2013) ==
=== Serie A ===
	ASA	INT	PET	PRI	LIB	Rec.
ASA		72-84; 29/03/13	80-110; 30/03/13	74-98; 01/03/13	0-20; 12/04/13	0-4
Interclube	91-86; 22/02/13		95-90; 12/04/13	98-90; 23/02/13	83-86; 02/03/13	3-1
Petro Atlético	95-87; 23/02/13	96-104; 08/03/13		83-109; 02/03/13	79-96; 01/03/13	1-3
Primeiro de Agosto	98-74; 05/04/13	79-68; 30/03/13	93-84; 06/04/13		100-87; 22/02/13	4-0
Recreativo do Libolo	81-73; 08/03/13	86-83; 06/04/13	81-91; 05/04/13	87-86; 29/03/13		3-1
Record	0-4	2-2	2-2	2-2	3-1	

=== Serie B ===
	CDU	LUS	PRO	VIA	VIL	Rec.
CDUAN		86-81; 05/04/13	0-20; 06/04/13	- 30/03/13	- 23/02/13	
Universidade Lusíada	- 01/03/13		103-98; 12/04/13	- 22/02/13	- 02/03/13	
Progresso	- 02/03/13	85-87; 08/03/13		113-56; 30/03/13	86-66; 29/03/13	
Amigos de Viana	- 12/04/13	73-105; 29/03/13	- 23/02/13		53-118; 05/04/13	
Vila Clotilde	95-73; 30/03/13	90-101; 06/04/13	88-77; 22/02/13	- 01/03/13		
Record						

=== Serie A Standings ===
Team	Pts
Primeiro de Agosto	14
Recreativo do Libolo	14
Interclube	13
Petro Atlético	13
ASA	9

As the group winner, Primeiro de Agosto is awarded a bonus point for the final four.

=== Serie B Standings ===
Team	Pts
Vila Clotilde	14
Universidade Lusíada	13
Progresso	12
CDUAN	8
Amigos de viana	7

== 5th–8th Place (April 26 - May 21, 2013) ==
	ASA	LUS	PRO	VIL	Rec.
ASA		90-94	74-71	84-70	
Lusíada					
Progresso					
Vila Clotilde					
Record					

== Final Four (April 26 - May 21, 2013) ==
	INT		PET		PRI		LIB		Rec.
Interclube			94-101; 30/04/13	88-107; 14/05/13	77-91; 04/05/13	96-98; 18/05/13	90-83; 02/05/13	116-110; 16/05/13	2-4
Petro Atlético	90-93; 07/05/13	110-100; 21/05/13			80-100; 02/05/13	76-81; 16/05/13	95-81; 27/04/13	94-109; 11/05/13	2-4
Primeiro de Agosto	90-93; 27/04/13	95-89; 11/05/13	87-74; 26/04/13	88-93; 09/05/13			84-80; 07/05/13	101-93; 21/05/13	4-2
Recreativo do Libolo	82-78; 26/04/13	83-67; 09/05/13	106-92; 04/05/13	100-96; 18/05/13	97-88; 30/04/13	83-91; 14/05/13			5-1
Record	2-4		3-3		5-1		1-5		

=== Final Four Standings ===
P	Team	Pld	W	L	PF	PA	Diff	Pts
1	Primeiro de Agosto	12	9	3	1094	1031	+63	22
2	Recreativo do Libolo	12	6	6	1107	1092	+15	18
3	Petro Atlético	12	5	7	1108	1127	-15	17
4	Interclube	12	4	8	1081	1140	-59	16

=== R. do Libolo vs. Interclube ===
April 26, 2013
16:00 WAT

R. do Libolo	82–78	Interclube

Pavilhão Dream Space, Luanda

May 2, 2013
18:00 WAT

Interclube	90–83	R. do Libolo
Scoring by quarter: 19-16
Pts: R.Nealy 28		Pts: n/a

Pavilhão 28 de Fevereiro, Luanda

May 9, 2013
16:00 WAT

R. do Libolo	83–67	Interclube
Scoring by quarter: 19-8, 25-30, 19-16, 20-13
Pts: Bonifácio 23; Rebs: Olímpio 10; Asts: n/a		Pts: Mingas 26; Rebs: Mingas 12; Asts: Mílton 6

Pavilhão do Dream Space, Luanda

May 16, 2013
18:00 WAT

Report (in Portuguese)

Interclube	116–110	R. do Libolo
Scoring by quarter: 38-33, 22-26, 24-34, 32-17
Pts: Mingas 38; Rebs: Mingas 10		Pts: Bonifácio, Fortes 19; Rebs: Sidnei 7

Pavilhão 28 de Fevereiro, Luanda

=== 1º de Agosto vs. Petro Atlético ===
April 26, 2013
18:00 WAT

1º de Agosto	87–74	Petro Atlético
Pts: C.Isom 21; Rebs: C.Isom 9		Pts: P.Santana 19; Rebs: M.Kiala 11

Pavilhão do CODENM, Luanda

May 2, 2013
18:00 WAT

Report (in Portuguese)

Petro Atlético	80–100	1º de Agosto
Scoring by quarter: 25-22, 21-27, 20-22, 14-29
Pts: C.Morais 23; Rebs: M.Kiala 7 Asts: Santana, Mbunga 4		Pts: R.Moore 30; Rebs: F.Ambrósio 11; Asts: C.Isom 6

Pavilhão Anexo 2, Luanda

May 9, 2013
18:00 WAT

Report (in Portuguese)

1º de Agosto	88–93	Petro Atlético
Scoring by quarter: 25-22, 21-24, 22-22, 25-20
Pts: R.Moore 22		Pts: C.Morais 27

Pavilhão do CODENM, Luanda

May 16, 2013
18:00 WAT

Report (in Portuguese)

Petro Atlético	76–81	1º de Agosto
Scoring by quarter: 22-20, 19-20, 21-20, 14-21
Pts: Leonel 21		Pts: R.Moore 37

Pavilhão Anexo II, Luanda

=== Petro Atlético vs. R. do Libolo ===
April 27, 2013
16:00 WAT

Petro Atlético	95–81	R. do Libolo
Scoring by quarter: 25-18, 18-20, 25-26, 27-17
Pts: C.Morais 20; Rebs: M.Kiala 17		Pts: Ricardino 20; Rebs: Olímpio 10

Pavilhão Anexo II, Luanda

May 4, 2013
16:00 WAT

R. do Libolo	106–92	Petro Atlético

Pavilhão do Dream Space, Luanda

May 11, 2013
18:00 WAT

Petro Atlético	94–109	R. do Libolo
Scoring by quarter: 18-28, 19-21, 22-32, 36-28
Pts: n/a		Pts: Sidnei 20

Pavilhão Anexo II, Luanda

May 18, 2013
16:00 WAT

R. do Libolo	100–96	Petro Atlético

Pavilhão do Dream Space, Luanda

=== 1º de Agosto vs. Interclube ===
April 27, 2013
18:00 WAT

1º de Agosto	90–93	Interclube
Scoring by quarter: 25-23, 21-25, 25-12, 19-33
Pts: R.Moore 25		Pts: R.Nealy 20

Pavilhão do CODENM, Luanda

May 4, 2013
18:00 WAT

Interclube	77–91	1º de Agosto
Scoring by quarter: 21-28, 15-18, 18-24, 23-21
Pts: R.Nealy 28; Rebs: n/a Asts: n/a		Pts: C.Isom 25; Rebs: C.Isom 8 Asts: C.Isom 3

Pavilhão 28 de Fevereiro, Luanda

May 11, 2013
18:00 WAT

Report (in Portuguese)

1º de Agosto	95–89	Interclube
Scoring by quarter: 26-18, 19-31, 21-24, 29-16
Pts: R.Moore 30		Pts: Mílton, Xavier 20

Pavilhão do CODENM, Luanda

May 18, 2013
18:00 WAT

Report (in Portuguese)

Interclube	96–98	1º de Agosto
Pts: R.Nealy 25		Pts: Kikas 19

Pavilhão 28 de Fevereiro, Luanda

=== R. do Libolo vs. 1º de Agosto ===
April 30, 2013
16:00 WAT

R. do Libolo	97–88	1º de Agosto
Scoring by quarter: 23-24, 24-20, 30-13, 21-31
Pts: L.Costa 15; Rebs: L.Costa 8 Asts: Olímpio 5		Pts: C.Isom 23; Rebs: Ambrósio 10; Asts: C.Isom 3

Pavilhão do Dream Space, Luanda

May 7, 2013
18:00 WAT

1º de Agosto	84–80	R. do Libolo
Scoring by quarter: 16-15, 16-26, 26-15, 26-24
Pts: R.Moore 23		Pts: Olímpio 21

Pavilhão do CODENM, Luanda

May 14, 2013
16:00 WAT

R. do Libolo	83–91	1º de Agosto
Scoring by quarter: 13-25, 18-21, 21-27, 30-18
Pts: Olímpio 17; Rebs: Olímpio 8 Asts: R.Fortes 4		Pts: Kikas 19; Rebs: Ambrósio 10; Asts: Isom 5

Pavilhão do Dream Space, Luanda

May 21, 2013
19:00 WAT

1º de Agosto	101–93	R. do Libolo
Scoring by quarter: 27-23, 25-20, 23-27, 26-23

Pavilhão do CODENM, Luanda

=== Interclube vs. Petro Atlético ===
April 30, 2013
18:00 WAT

Interclube	94–101	Petro Atlético
Scoring by quarter: 25-21, 30-30, 22-23, 17-27
Pts: R.Nealy		Pts: C.Morais 34

Pavilhão 28 de Fevereiro, Luanda

May 7, 2013
18:30 WAT

Petro Atlético	90–93 (OT)	Interclube
Scoring by quarter: 15-21, 15-8, 32-16, 19 -36, Overtime: 9-12
Pts: C.Morais 23; Rebs: H.Mbunga 12; Asts: Leonel 4		Pts: Mílton 31; Rebs: n/a Asts: n/a

Pavilhão Anexo II, Luanda

May 14, 2013
18:00 WAT

Interclube	88–107	Petro Atlético
Scoring by quarter: 26-40, 21-21, 20-21, 21-27
Pts: Uhegwu 18		Pts: C.Morais 25

Pavilhão 28 de Fevereiro, Luanda

May 21, 2013
16:00 WAT

Petro Atlético	110–100 (OT)	Interclube
Scoring by quarter: 26-26, 23-19, 22-26, 23-23, Overtime: 16-6
Pts: C.Morais 25		Pts: Mingas 24

Pavilhão do CODENM, Luanda

== Awards ==
2013 BAI Basket MVP
(United States) Cedric Isom (Primeiro de Agosto)
2013 BAI Basket Top Scorer
(Angola) Carlos Morais (Petro Atlético)
2013 BAI Basket Top Rebounder
(Angola) Eduardo Mingas (Interclube)
2013 BAI Basket Top Assists
(United States) Cedric Isom (Primeiro de Agosto)

== Final Standings ==
P	Team
1	Primeiro de Agosto
2	Recreativo do Libolo
3	Petro de Luanda
4	Interclube
5	Lusíada
6	ASA
7	CDUAN
8	Progresso
9	Vila Clotilde
10	Amigos de Viana

== All Tournament Team ==
(United States) Cedric Isom (1º de Agosto)
(Angola) Carlos Morais (Petro Atlético)
(United States) Reggie Moore (1º de Agosto)
(Angola) Eduardo Mingas (Interclube)
(Angola) Kikas Gomes (1º de Agosto)

2013 BAI Basket

Clube Desportivo Primeiro de Agosto
17th Title

Most Valuable Player
(United States) Cedric Isom

== See also ==
- 2013 Angola Basketball Cup
- 2013 Angola Basketball Super Cup
- 2013 Victorino Cunha Cup
