= 1999–2000 BAI Basket =

BAI Basket 2000
- League: BAI Basket
- Sport: Basketball
- Duration: November 20, 2008 – May 16, 2009
- Teams: 8
- TV partner: TPA1 (Angola) TPA Internacional (Worldwide) Supersport (Africa)

BAI Basket season
- Champions: Primeiro de Agosto

BAI Basket seasons
- ← 1998–99 2000–01 →

The 1999–2000 Season of BAI Basket (31st edition) ran from November 20, 2008 through May 16, 2000, with 8 teams playing in three different stages: in stage one (regular season) teams played a double round robin system. In stage two, the six best teams played a single round robin tournament in serie A and the last six did the same for the consolation group, serie B. Finally, in stage three (final four) the best four teams from serie A played in a round robin at four rounds for the title. The winners of the regular season and of the serie A are awarded a bonus point for the serie A and the final four, respectively.

== BAI Basket Participants (1999–2000 Season) ==
| Team | Home |
|---|---|
| ASA | Luanda |
| CDUAN | Luanda |
| Desportivo da Huíla | Lubango |
| Imbondeiro | Luanda |
| Interclube | Luanda |
| Petro Atlético | Luanda |
| Primeiro de Agosto | Luanda |
| PROMADE | Cabinda |
| Recreativo do Libolo | Luanda |
| Sporting de Luanda | Luanda |
| Universidade Lusíadas | Luanda |
| Vila Clotilde | Luanda |

== BAI Basket Squads (1999–2000 Season) ==
BAI Basket Squads (1999–2000 Season)

== Regular season (November 20, 2000 – March 25, 2000) ==
| | AND | ASA | CPP | INT | NOC | PET | PRI | SCL | VIL | Rec. |
| AND | | | | | (D19); 24/03/00 | 77–125; 04/03/00 | 45–101; 11/03/00 | | (D15); 21/03/00 | |
| ASA | | | 120–59; 03/03/00 | | | | 88–82; 23/02/00 | (D19); 24/03/00 | | |
| CPPL | | 92–143; 04/03/00 | | | | | | 91–83; 11/03/00 | | |
| Interclube | | | | | | | 73–91; 03/03/00 | | (D19); 24/03/00 | |
| Desportivo Nocal | | | | 74–70; 10/03/00 | | (D20); 25/03/00 | | 81–88; 03/03/00 | | |
| Petro Atlético | | 86–81; 17/03/00 | | | | | 93–76; 24/03/00 | | 120–65; 11/03/00 | |
| Primeiro de Agosto | | 86–74; 10/03/00 | | (D1); 14/03/00 | | | | | | |
| Sporting de Luanda | | 55–97; 11/03/00 | 76–75; 06/03/00 | (D20); 25/03/00 | | | 59–70; 04/03/00 | | | |
| Vila Clotilde | | | | | 66–58; 04/03/00 | 56–107; 03/03/00 | (D20); 25/03/00 | | | |
| Record | | | | | | | | | | |

== Knockout stage ==
Quarterfinals
April 21/22/28
Primeiro de Agosto | 120 | 105 | 94 | – | –
Vila Clotilde | 53 | 59 | 47 | – | –
April 21/22/28/29
ASA | 139 | 103 | 108 | – | –
Desportivo da Nocal | 61 | 68 | 52 | – | –
April 21/22/27
Petro Atlético | 201 | 182 | –
CPPL | 96 | 72 | –
April 21/22/28/29
Interclube | 80 | 69 | 63
Sporting de Luanda | 81 | 53 | 86

Semifinals
May 12/13/19
Primeiro de Agosto | 81 | 107 | 87 | – | –
ASA | 73 | 90 | 76 | – | –
May 12/13/19
Petro Atlético | 122 | 113 | –
Sporting de Luanda | 90 | 74 | –

Final
May 26/27//Jun 16/17
Primeiro de Agosto | 102 | 96 | 82 | 82 | 90 | 85 | –
Petro Atlético | 98 | 103 | 68 | 70 | 102 | 73 | –

17 June 2000

| Petro Atlético | 73–85 | 1º de Agosto |
Scoring by quarter: 21-25, 19-21, 12-19, 21-20
| Pts: Baduna 30 | | Pts: Ângelo 17 |

Pavilhão da Cidadela, Luanda
Referees: Soares de Campos, Fernando Pacheco

== Final standings ==
| P | Team | Pts |
|---|---|---|
| 1 | Primeiro de Agosto | 42 |
| 2 | Petro Atlético | 41 |
| 3 | ASA | 40 |
| 4 | Recreativo do Libolo | 38 |
| 5 | PROMADE - Misto de Cabinda | 36 |
| 6 | Interclube | 35 |
| 7 | CDUAN | 31 |
| 8 | Desportivo da Huíla | 31 |
| 9 | Lusíada | 28 |
| 10 | Vila Clotilde | 25 |
| 11 | Sporting de Luanda | 25 |
| 12 | Imbondeiro de Viana | 22 |

2000 BAI Basket
Clube Desportivo Primeiro de Agosto
8th title

Most Valuable Player

== See also ==
- 2000 Angola Basketball Cup
- 2000 Angola Basketball Super Cup
- Federação Angolana de Basquetebol
