= 2019–20 Angolan Basketball League =

- Season: 2019–20
- Teams: 8

Regular season
- BAL: Petro de Luanda

Finals
- Champions: None declared

The 2019–20 Angolan Basketball League was the 42nd season of the Angolan Basketball League, the highest premier basketball league in Angola. On 14 May 2020, the FAB announced the season was cancelled due to the COVID-19 pandemic.

== Teams ==
Helmarc Academia withdrew from the league.

Club	Location	Venue	Capacity
ASA	Luanda	Pavilhão da Cidadela	6,873
Helmarc Academia	Luanda	Pavilhão Multiusos do Kilamba	1,500
Interclube	Luanda	Pavilhão 28 de Fevereiro	700
Marinha	Luanda	Pavilhão Victorino Cunha	2,000
Petro de Luanda	Luanda	Pavilhão da Cidadela	6,873
Primeiro de Agosto	Luanda	Pavilhão Victorino Cunha	1,500
Universidade Lusíada	Luanda	Pavilhão Anexo	1,500
Vila Clotilde	Luanda	Pavilhão Anexo	1,500
Kwanza	Luanda	Pavilhão Victorino Cunha	1,500

== Regular season ==
Pos	Team	Pld	W	L	Qualification or relegation
1	Petro de Luanda	14	13	1	Qualification to 2021 BAL season
2	Primeiro de Agosto	14	11	3	
3	Interclube	14	11	3	
4	Marinha	14	8	6	
5	ASA	14	5	9	
6	Universidade Lusíada	14	3	11	
7	Vila Clotilde	14	3	11	
8	CD Kwanza	14	2	12	

Source: Afrobasket.com
