= 2017–18 Angolan Basketball League =

- League: Angolan Basketball League
- Sport: Basketball
- Number of teams: 10
- Top seed: Primeiro de Agosto
- Season MVP: Regular season: Gerson Gonçalves (Petro); Overall: Eduardo Mingas (Primeiro)

Playoffs
- Finals champions: Primeiro de Agosto (19th title)
- Runners-up: Petro de Luanda

Seasons
- ← 2016–17 2018–19 →

The 2017–18 Angolan Basketball League, for sponsorships named the 2017–18 Unitel Basket, was the 40th edition of the Angolan Basketball League. The season ended on 6 June, when Primeiro de Agosto won its 19th championship.

== Regular season ==
Pos	2017–18 Angolan Basketball League regular season			
Pos	Team	Pld	W	L
1	Primeiro de Agosto	32	31	1
2	Petro de Luanda	32	26	6
3	Benfica do Libolo	33	26	7
4	Interclube	33	19	12
5	ASA	32	18	14
6	Marinha de Guerra	31	14	17
7	Universidade Lusíada	32	17	15
8	Helmarc Academia	31	8	23
9	Vila Clotilde	32	8	24
10	Recreativo Crisgunza	32	13	19

== Playoffs ==
Quarterfinals
1	Primeiro de Agosto	2
8	Helmarc	0
4	Interclube	1
5	ASA	2
2	Petro de Luanda	2
7	Lusíada	0
3	Libolo	2
6	Marinha de Guerra	0

Semifinals
1	Primeiro de Agosto	3
5	ASA	0
2	Petro de Luanda	3
3	Lioblo	0

Finals
1	Primeiro de Agosto	4
2	Petro de Luanda	1
