= Angolan Basketball League =

- Organising body: Angolan Basketball Federation (FAB)
- Founded: 1977; 49 years ago
- First season: 1978–79
- Country: Angola
- Confederation: FIBA Africa
- Number of teams: 13
- Level on pyramid: 1
- Domestic cup: Taça de Angola
- Supercup: Supertaça de Angola
- International cup: Basketball Africa League (BAL)
- Current champions: Petro de Luanda (19th title) (2025–26)
- Most championships: Primeiro de Agosto & Petro de Luanda (19 titles)
- Website: Link
- 2025–26 Angolan Basketball League

The Angolan Men's Basketball League, (in Portuguese: Campeonato Nacional de Basquetebol em Séniores Masculinos), for sponsorship reasons known as the Unitel Basket, is the top tier men's basketball league in Angola.

Primeiro de Agosto and Petro de Luanda have been the most successful clubs in Angola with a total of 19 titles won each.

The champions of each Unitel Basket season qualify directly for the Basketball Africa League (BAL).

== Sponsorship names ==
In 2014, the Angolan Basketball Federation signed a sponsoring deal with Angola's Banco de Investimento e Crédito, which it claimed to be more favourable than the one with Banco Africano de Investimentos. Such agreement caused the league to be renamed as BIC Basket.

The league was formerly known as BAI Basket, BIC Basket and Unitel Basket, named after its major sponsors, formerly Banco Africano de Investimentos (BAI), Banco de Investimento e Crédito (BIC) and Unitel, the competition is organized by the Angolan Basketball Federation.

- BAI Basket (until 2024)
- BIC Basket: (2014–2017)
- Unitel Basket: (2017–present)

== Teams ==
=== Current teams ===
The following fourteen teams play in the 2024–25 season:

Club	Location
Akiras Academy	Uíge
ASA	Luanda
Clube Amigos de Benguela	Benguela
CPPL	Lobito
Desportivo Kwanza	Luanda
Interclube	Luanda (Rocha Pinto)
Interclube B	Luanda (Rocha Pinto)
Petro de Luanda	Luanda (Eixo Viário)
Petro de Luanda B	Luanda (Eixo Viário)
Primeiro de Agosto	Luanda
Sporting de Luanda	Luanda
Sporting de Luanda	Luanda
Vila Clotilde	Luanda (Maculusso)
Vila Clotilde B	Luanda (Maculusso)

=== Former teams ===
Club	Location	Venue	Founded	Last season
Amigos de Viana	Luanda (Viana)			2014
Benfica do Libolo †	Luanda (Libolo)	Pavilhão Dream Space	1942	2018
CDUAN	Luanda	Pavilhão Anexo		2013
G.D.R. Crisgunza	Benguela			2018
Helmarc Academia	Luanda	Pavilhão Multiusos de Luanda		2019
Jesus Cristo	Viana			2024
Marinha de Guerra	Luanda	Pavilhão Victorino Cunha	2014	2021
Progresso do Sambizanga †	Luanda	Pavilhão 28 de Fevereiro	1975	2017
Sporting de Benguela †	Benguela	Pavilhão Joaquim Araújo	1915	2016
Universidade Lusíada †	Luanda	Pavilhão Anexo	2007	2020

Note: † denotes a team that has been dissolved.

== Before independence ==
It wasn't until 1963 that the Portuguese national basketball championship began to include clubs from the províncias ultramarinas (overseas provinces) of Angola and Mozambique. This new format began with one team from each of the three locations and then changed to two teams from the host and one from each of the remaining two locations, who played a round-robin (then double round-robin) tournament to determine the champion of Portugal, with the championship taking place alternatively at each of the three capitals: Luanda (Angola), Lourenço Marques (Mozambique) and Lisbon/Porto (Portugal). From 1963 to 1974, 12 championships were held, with only one Angolan club succeeding to win the championship: Benfica de Luanda in 1967

Season	Location	Champion	Score	Runner-up	Score	Third	Score	Fourth
1962-63	(Portugal) Lisboa	(Portugal) Benfica de Lisboa	64–53	(Mozambique) Desportivo de L.Marques	89–26	(Angola) Atlético de Nova Lisboa		
1963-64	(Angola) Luanda	(Portugal) Benfica de Lisboa	54–44	(Mozambique) Desportivo de L.Marques	–	(Angola) ?		
1964-65	(Mozambique) Lourenço Marques	(Portugal) Benfica de Lisboa	59–54	(Mozambique) Sporting de Lourenço Marques	–	(Angola) Sporting de Luanda		
1965-66	(Portugal) Lisboa	(Mozambique) Sporting de Lourenço Marques	79–78	(Portugal) Benfica de Lisboa	76–69	Sporting de Portugal	90–51	(Angola) Sporting de Benguela
1966-67	(Angola) Luanda	(Angola) Benfica de Luanda	–	(Portugal) Académica de Coimbra	–	(Mozambique) Sporting de Lourenço Marques	–	(Angola) Ferroviário de Moçâmedes
1967-68	(Mozambique) Lourenço Marques	(Mozambique) Sporting de Lourenço Marques	70–58	(Mozambique) Desportivo de L.Marques	70–54	(Portugal) Banco Pinto Magalhães	81–63	(Angola) Benfica de Luanda
1968-69	(Portugal) Lisboa	Sporting de Portugal	80–52 74–45	(Mozambique) Desportivo de L.Marques	65–52 61–52	(Portugal) Académica de Coimbra	64–62 81–61	(Angola) Sporting de Luanda
1969-70	(Angola) Luanda	(Portugal) Benfica de Lisboa	63–68 78–77	(Mozambique) Sporting de Lourenço Marques	41–69 75–65	(Angola) Benfica de Luanda	74–68 74–46	(Angola) Belenenses de Luanda
1970-71	(Mozambique) Lourenço Marques	(Mozambique) Sporting de Lourenço Marques	69–65 62–65	(Mozambique) Desportivo de L.Marques	60–54 65–61	Sporting de Portugal	88–64 60–79	(Angola) Benfica de Luanda
1971-72	(Portugal) Porto	(Portugal) F.C. do Porto	99–84 84–85	(Mozambique) Sporting de Lourenço Marques	99–93 78–93	(Portugal) Académica de Coimbra	94–77 88–72	(Angola) Benfica de Luanda
1972-73	(Angola) Luanda	(Mozambique) Sporting de Lourenço Marques	89–101 102–77	(Portugal) Benfica de Lisboa	84–75 86–71	(Angola) Sporting de Luanda	55–50 71–62	(Angola) F.C. de Luanda
1973-74	(Mozambique) Lourenço Marques	(Mozambique) C.D. Malhangalene	78–82 80–66	(Mozambique) Sporting de Lourenço Marques	– –	(Portugal) Benfica de Lisboa	97–82 85–65	(Angola) F.C. de Luanda

=== Total league championships ===
Team	Won	Years won
(Mozambique) Sporting de Lourenço Marques	4	1966, 1968, 1971, 1973
(Portugal) Benfica de Lisboa	4	1963, 1964, 1965, 1970
(Mozambique) C.D. Malhangalene	1	1974
(Portugal) F.C. do Porto	1	1971
Sporting de Portugal	1	1969
(Angola) Benfica de Luanda	1	1967

== List of champions and finals ==
Season	Champion	Runner-up	Series	Champion Coach	Reference
1978–79	Ferroviário de Luanda				
1979–80	ASA				
1980–81	Primeiro de Agosto				
1981–82	Sporting de Luanda				
1982–83	Primeiro de Agosto				
1983–84	Sporting de Luanda				
1984–85	Primeiro de Agosto				
1985–86	Primeiro de Agosto				
1986–87	Primeiro de Agosto				
1987–88	Primeiro de Agosto				
1988–89	Petro de Luanda				
1989–90	Petro de Luanda				
1990–91	Primeiro de Agosto				
1991–92	Petro de Luanda				
1992–93	Petro de Luanda				
1993–94	Petro de Luanda				
1994–95	Petro de Luanda				
1995–96	ASA				
1996–97	ASA				
1997–98	Petro de Luanda				
1998–99	Petro de Luanda	Primeiro de Agosto	4–0	(Angola) Wlademiro Romero	
1999–2000	Primeiro de Agosto	Petro de Luanda	4–2	(Portugal) Mário Palma	
2000–01	Primeiro de Agosto	Petro de Luanda	4–2	(Portugal) Mário Palma	
2001–02	Primeiro de Agosto	Interclube	4–0	(Portugal) Mário Palma	
2002–03	Primeiro de Agosto	Petro de Luanda	4–0	(Portugal) Mário Palma	
2003–04	Primeiro de Agosto	Petro de Luanda	4–2	(Portugal) Mário Palma	
2004–05	Primeiro de Agosto	Interclube	4–1	(Angola) Jaime Covilhã	
2005–06	Petro de Luanda	Primeiro de Agosto	Round Robin	(Angola) Alberto de Carvalho	
2006–07	Petro de Luanda	Primeiro de Agosto	88–78	(Angola) Alberto de Carvalho	
2007–08	Primeiro de Agosto	Petro de Luanda	Round Robin	(Portugal) Luís Magalhães	
2008–09	Primeiro de Agosto	Petro de Luanda	Final Four	(Portugal) Luís Magalhães	
2009–10	Primeiro de Agosto	Recreativo do Libolo	Final Four	(Portugal) Luís Magalhães	
2010–11	Petro de Luanda	Recreativo do Libolo	Final Four	(Portugal) Alberto Babo	
2011–12	Recreativo do Libolo	Primeiro de Agosto	Final Four	(Angola) Raúl Duarte	
2012–13	Primeiro de Agosto	Recreativo do Libolo	Final Four	(Angola) Paulo Macedo	
2013–14	Recreativo do Libolo	Primeiro de Agosto	Final Four	(Portugal) Norberto Alves	
2014–15	Petro de Luanda	Recreativo do Libolo	4–3	(Cameroon) Lazare Adingono	
2015–16	Primeiro de Agosto	Recreativo do Libolo	4–1	(Spain) Ricard Casas	
2016–17	Recreativo do Libolo	Petro de Luanda	4–0	(Spain) Hugo López	
2017–18	Primeiro de Agosto	Petro de Luanda	4–1	(Angola) Paulo Macedo	
2018–19	Petro de Luanda	Primeiro de Agosto	4–2	(Cameroon) Lazare Adingono	
2019–20	Cancelled early due to the COVID-19 pandemic				
2020–21	Petro de Luanda	Interclube	3–0	(Brazil) José Neto	
2021–22	Petro de Luanda	Interclube	3–0	(Brazil) José Neto	
2022–23	Petro de Luanda	Primeiro de Agosto	3–1	(Brazil) José Neto	
2023–24	Petro de Luanda	Interclube	3–1	(Spain) Sergio Valdeolmillos	
2024–25	Petro de Luanda	Primeiro de Agosto	4–1	(Spain) Sergio Valdeolmillos	
2025–26	Petro de Luanda	Sporting de Luanda	4–0	(Spain) Sergio Valdeolmillos	

== MVP award winners and statistical leaders ==
Season	Champion	MVP	Top Scorer	Rebounds	Assists
1997–98	Petro de Luanda	(Angola) Carlos Almeida (PET)			
1998–99	Petro de Luanda				
1999–00	Primeiro de Agosto				
2000–01	Primeiro de Agosto				
2001–02	Primeiro de Agosto	(Angola) Gerson dos Santos (VIL)			
2002–03	Primeiro de Agosto	(Angola) Miguel Lutonda (PRI)	(Angola) Eduardo Mingas (INT)	(Angola) Eduardo Mingas (INT)	(Angola) Miguel Lutonda (PRI)
2003–04	Primeiro de Agosto	(Angola) Eduardo Mingas (INT)	(Angola) Eduardo Mingas (INT) 18.6	(Angola) Eduardo Mingas (INT) 9.6	(Angola) Carlos Quibato (ASA) 4.9
2004–05	Primeiro de Agosto				
2005–06	Petro de Luanda	(Portugal) Francisco Jordão (PET)	(Portugal) Francisco Jordão (PET)	(Angola) Eduardo Mingas (PET) 69/31	(United States) Shannon Crooks (PET)
2006–07	Petro de Luanda	(Angola) Carlos Morais (PET)	(Angola) Olímpio Cipriano (PRI)	(Democratic Republic of the Congo) Lifetu Selengue (INT)	(Angola) Armando Costa (PRI)
2007–08	Primeiro de Agosto	(Angola) Olímpio Cipriano (PRI)	(Angola) Olímpio Cipriano (PRI)	(Angola) Joaquim Gomes (PRI)	(Angola) Armando Costa (PRI)
2008–09	Primeiro de Agosto				
2009–10	Primeiro de Agosto	(Angola) Joaquim Gomes (PRI)	(United States) Reggie Moore (LIB) 20.53	(Angola) Eduardo Mingas (PET)	(Angola) Paulo Santana (PET)
2010–11	Petro de Luanda	(Angola) Olímpio Cipriano (LIB)	(Angola) Carlos Morais (PET)	(Angola) Miguel Kiala (PET) 75/48	(Angola) Olímpio Cipriano (LIB)
2011–12	Recreativo do Libolo	(Angola) Olímpio Cipriano (LIB)	(Angola) Olímpio Cipriano (LIB)	(Angola) Hermenegildo Mbunga (PET)	(Angola) Armando Costa (PRI)
2012–13	Primeiro de Agosto	(United States) Cedric Isom (PRI)	(Angola) Carlos Morais (PET) 21.66	(Angola) Eduardo Mingas (INT) 176/12	(United States) Cedric Isom (PRI) 4.8
2013–14	Recreativo do Libolo	(Angola) Eduardo Mingas (LIB)	(United States) Roderick Nealy (PET)	(Angola) Felizardo Ambrósio (PRI)	(Angola) Paulo Santana (PET)
2014–15	Petro de Luanda	(Dominican Republic) Manny Quezada (PET)	(Angola) Leonel Paulo (PET) 17.6	(United States) Jason Cain (PET) 11	(United States) Manny Quezada (PET) 3.9
2015–16	Primeiro de Agosto	(Angola) Gildo Santos (PRI)	(Angola) Carlos Morais (PET)	(United States) Jason Cain (PET)	(Angola) Gerson Domingos (INT)
2016–17	Recreativo do Libolo	(Angola) Olímpio Cipriano (LIB)	(Dominican Republic) Manny Quezada (PRI)	(Angola) Eduardo Mingas (LIB)	(United States) Je'Kel Foster (LIB)
2017–18					
2018–19	Petro de Luanda	(Angola) Gerson Gonçalves (PET)			
2019–20	Not awarded due to the COVID-19 pandemic				
2020–21	Petro de Luanda	(Angola) Aboubakar Gakou (PET)	(Angola) Carlos Morais (PET)	(Angola) Jilson Bango (PRI)	(Angola) Elmer Félix (INT)
2021–22	Petro de Luanda	(Angola) Gerson Gonçalves (PET)	(Angola) Miguel Maconda (JC)	(Angola) Wilson Kassav (JC)	(Angola) Gerson Gonçalves (PET)
2022–23	Petro de Luanda	(Angola) Aboubakar Gakou (PET)	(Angola) Josué Bartolomeu (CAB)	(Angola) Keven Albino (INT-B)	(Angola) Childe Dundão (PET)
2023–24	Petro de Luanda	(Angola) Childe Dundão (PET)	(Angola) Elcane Paca (PRI)	(Angola) Joseney Joaquim (INT)	(Angola) Childe Dundão (PET)
2024–25	Petro de Luanda	(Angola) Aboubakar Gakou (PET)	(Angola) Danilson Jacinto (CD Kwanza)	(Angola) Josué Bartolomeu	(Angola) Childe Dundão (PET)

== Performance by club ==
The following table lists the performance of all teams that have won or were runners-up in the Angolan Basketball League. Six teams have won the Angolan championship over history.

Bold indicates club that are still active in the Angolan Basketball League.

Club	Winners	Runners-up	Years won	Years runners-up
**Primeiro de Agosto**	19	8	1981, 1983, 1985, 1986, 1987, 1988, 1991, 2000, 2001, 2002, 2003, 2004, 2005, 2008, 2009, 2010, 2013, 2016, 2018	2006, 2007, 2011, 2012, 2014, 2023, 2025
**Petro de Luanda**	19	6	1989, 1990, 1992, 1993, 1994, 1995, 1998, 1999, 2006, 2007, 2011, 2015, 2019, 2021, 2022, 2023, 2024, 2025, 2026	2000, 2001, 2003, 2004, 2008, 2009, 2017
Benfica do Libolo	3	5	2012, 2014, 2017	2010, 2011, 2013, 2015, 2016
**ASA (Note: Formerly, the team was named "Desportivo da TAAG".)**	3	0	1980, 1996, 1997	—
Sporting de Luanda	2	1	1982, 1984	2026
Ferroviário de Luanda	1	0	1979	—
**Interclube**	0	5	—	2002, 2005, 2021, 2022, 2024

== League details (2000s) ==
Club
Club	2000	2001	2002	2003	2004	2005	2006	2007	2008	2009	2010	2011	2012	2013	2014	2015	2016	2017	2018		Gold medal	Silver medal	Bronze medal
–	–	–	–	10	–	–	9	11	12	12	8	12	12	10	10	10	10	9	–	–	–	–	–
Amigos de Viana	⋅	⋅	⋅	⋅	⋅	⋅	⋅	⋅	⋅	⋅	⋅	⋅	12	10	10	⋅	⋅	⋅	⋅				
ASA	⋅	⋅	2002	03 2003	3 2004	⋅	4	4	4	03 2009	4	5	5	6	7	4	7	√					
Banca de Cabinda	⋅	⋅	⋅	⋅	⋅	⋅	5	⋅	⋅	⋅	⋅	⋅	⋅	⋅	⋅	⋅	⋅	⋅	⋅				
Benfica do Libolo	⋅	⋅	⋅	⋅	⋅	⋅	⋅	⋅	02 2008	4	2 2010	02 2011	01 2012	02 2013	01 2014	02 2015	02 2016	1 2017		9	2	5	0
C.P.P.L.	⋅	⋅	⋅	10	⋅	⋅	⋅	⋅	⋅	⋅	⋅	⋅	⋅	⋅	⋅	⋅	⋅	⋅	⋅				
CDUAN	⋅	⋅	⋅	⋅	⋅	⋅	6	7	7	7	⋅	12	9	7	⋅	⋅	⋅	⋅	⋅				
Desportivo da Huíla	⋅	⋅	⋅	⋅	⋅	⋅	⋅	⋅	8	8	7	⋅	⋅	⋅	⋅	⋅	⋅	⋅	⋅	3			
Desportivo da Nocal	⋅	⋅	⋅	7	⋅	⋅	9	8	⋅	⋅	⋅	⋅	⋅	⋅	⋅	⋅	⋅	⋅	⋅				
FC de Cabinda	⋅	⋅	⋅	8	⋅	⋅	⋅	⋅	⋅	⋅	⋅	⋅	⋅	⋅	⋅	⋅	⋅	⋅	⋅				
Helmarc	⋅	⋅	⋅	⋅	⋅	⋅	⋅	⋅	⋅	⋅	⋅	⋅	⋅	⋅	⋅	⋅	⋅	⋅		1			
Imbondeiro de Viana	⋅	⋅	⋅	⋅	⋅	⋅	⋅	11	12	12	⋅	⋅	⋅	⋅	⋅	⋅	⋅	⋅	⋅				
Interclube	⋅	⋅	2 2002	4	4	⋅	3 2006	03 2007	6	6	5	03 2011	4	4	4	5	4	4					
Lusíada	⋅	⋅	⋅	⋅	⋅	⋅	⋅	6	9	9	8	7	7	5	6	Q	6	√					
Marinha	⋅	⋅	⋅	⋅	⋅	⋅	⋅	⋅	⋅	⋅	⋅	⋅	⋅	⋅	⋅	Q	5	√					
Misto de Cabinda	⋅	⋅	⋅	⋅	⋅	⋅	⋅	5	⋅	⋅	⋅	⋅	⋅	⋅	⋅	⋅	⋅	⋅	⋅				
Petro de Luanda	2 2000	2 2001	4	02 2003	2 2004	⋅	1 2006	01 2007	03 2008	02 2009	3 2010	01 2011	03 2012	03 2013	03 2014	01 2015	03 2016	2 2017		16	4		1
Primeiro de Agosto	1 2000	1 2001	1 2002	01 2003	1 2004	2005	2 2006	02 2007	01 2008	01 2009	1 2010	4	02 2012	01 2013	02 2014	03 2015	01 2016	3 2017		16	11	3	1
Progresso do Sambizanga	⋅	⋅	⋅	⋅	⋅	⋅	⋅	⋅	⋅	⋅	⋅	⋅	⋅	8	9	Q	9	√	⋅				
PROMADE	⋅	⋅	⋅	⋅	⋅	⋅	⋅	⋅	5	5	6	⋅	⋅	⋅	⋅	⋅	⋅	⋅	⋅				
Santos FC	⋅	⋅	⋅	⋅	⋅	⋅	⋅	⋅	⋅	⋅	⋅	11	⋅	⋅	⋅	⋅	⋅	⋅	⋅				
Sporting de Benguela	⋅	⋅	⋅	⋅	⋅	⋅	⋅	⋅	⋅	⋅	⋅	⋅	⋅	⋅	5	?	10	⋅	⋅				
Sporting de Cabinda	⋅	⋅	⋅	6	⋅	⋅	⋅	⋅	⋅	⋅	⋅	6	6	⋅	⋅	⋅	⋅	⋅	⋅				
Sporting de Luanda	⋅	⋅	⋅	⋅	⋅	⋅	8	10	11	11	⋅	8	8	⋅	⋅	⋅	⋅	⋅	⋅				
Vila Clotilde	⋅	⋅	⋅	9	⋅	⋅	7	9	10	10	⋅	9	10	9	8	Q	8	√					
Vila Estoril	⋅	⋅	⋅	⋅	⋅	⋅	⋅	⋅	⋅	⋅	⋅	10	11	⋅	⋅	⋅	⋅	⋅	⋅				
# Teams	2000 –	2001 –	2002 –	2003 10	2004 –	2005 –	2006 9	2007 11	2008 12	2009 12	2010 8	2011 12	2012 12	2013 10	2014 10	2015 10	2016 10	2017 9	2018 9				

== League details (1980s) ==
Club
Club	1982	Gold medal	Silver medal	Bronze medal
Ferrovia	4			
Leões de Luanda	1 1982			
Primeiro de Agosto	02 1982			
Selecção Huambo	5			
TAAG	1982			
# Teams	1982			

== See also ==
- Angola 2nd Division Basketball
- Angola Cup
- Angola Super Cup
- Federação Angolana de Basquetebol
