= Manuel Silva (basketball) =

Angolan basketball player and coach

Personal information
- Born: 27 April 1968 (age 58) Luanda, Angola
- Listed height: 194 cm (6.36 ft)
- Listed weight: 104 kg (229 lb)

Career information
- Playing career: 1984–1998

Career history

Playing
- 1985–1988: Ferroviário Luanda
- 1988–1992: Petro Atlético
- 1993–1998: Física Torres Vedras

Coaching
- -: Física Torres Vedras (B)
- 2013–2014: Angola U16
- 2016–: Angola U18
Medals
Men's basketball
Representing Angola
FIBA Africa Under-18 Championship
Gold medal – first place	Kigali 2016	National Team
Silver medal – second place	Cairo 1984	National Team
Silver medal – second place	Abuja 1987	National Team
FIBA Africa Under-16 Championship
Gold medal – first place	Antananarivo 2013	National Team

Manuel da Ressurreição Figueiredo da Silva, nicknamed Gi (born 27 April 1968 in Luanda) is a former Angolan basketball player and a current basketball coach. At club level, Gi has been leading a reorganization effort of basketball at Clube Ferroviário de Luanda. In 2013, he has been appointed head coach of Angola's under-16 national basketball team. Following up to the success, he was appointed head coach of the U18 squad, two years later.

== 2013 ==
In July 2013, "Gi" led Angola's under-16 national basketball team to their first continental title, beating Egypt 75-66 in the final, thus securing a spot at the 2014 under-17 world basketball championship in Dubai.

== 2016 ==
In July 2016, "Gi" led Angola's under-18 national basketball team to their fourth African title, beating Egypt 86-82 in the final, in overtime, and qualify the team to the 2017 under-19 world basketball championship in Egypt.
