= Clube Ferroviário de Luanda (basketball) =

Ferroviário de Luanda
- Founded: 16 June 1909
- History: Ferroviário de Luanda; 1919–present
- Arena: Campo de Ferrovia
- Capacity: 500
- Location: Luanda, Angola
- Head coach: Jorge Abreu
- Championships: 1 (1979)
Home

The Clube Ferroviário de Luanda (in English: Railway Club Luanda) is an Angolan basketball team based in Luanda. It is the basketball section of the multi-sports club with the same name.

In the past, they have also played in Angolan Basketball League, winning the national title in 1979. While the club has currently not been involved in any official competitions at the senior level, Clube Ferroviário is one of the most traditional clubs in Luanda and the one to have won the first national basketball championship after the country's independence.

== Honours ==
- Angolan National Championship:
  - Winner (1): 1978–79

== Chairman history ==
- 1981–1985 Francisco de Almeida
- 1985–1988 Feliciano Pedrosa
- 1988–1995 António Agante
- 1996–2005 Sílvio Vinhas
- 2005–2012 Abel Cosme
- 2013–2016 Bráulio de Brito
- 2017–pres Jorge Abreu

== Rosters ==
=== 1985 Squad ===
Nat	No	Roster	Age	H	W	Pos	Nat	Staff	Position
(Angola)	0	Manuel Silva (Gi)	16				(Angola)	Wlademiro Romero	Head Coach
(Angola)	0	Aníbal Moreira
(Angola)	0	Josué Campos
(Angola)	0	Paulo Madeira
(Angola)	0	Gil Almeida
(Angola)	0	Hélder Cruz
🇦🇴	0	Antonio Eduardo Da Silva (Grants)

== See also ==
- Ferroviário de Luanda Handball
- Federação Angolana de Basquetebol
