= G.D.R. Crisgunza =

GDR Crisgunza
- Leagues: Angola League
- Location: Benguela, Angola
- Head coach: Manuel Silva Pipas

Grupo Desportivo e Recreativo Crisgunza, better known as GDR Crisgunza, is an Angolan semi-professional basketball team based in Benguela. The club made its debut in the Angolan top basketball league in 2018 after winning the 2nd division league.

The team is owned and sponsored by Crisgunza, a construction enterprise based in the city.

== Honours ==
Angolan Second Division

- Champions (1): 2017–18

== Players ==
G.D.R. Crisgunza Basketball players

=== 2018 ===
Nat	#	Name	A	P	H	W	–	M.S.
Nat	#	Name	A	P	H	W	2017	2018
Nat	#	Name	A	P	H	W	–	–
(Angola)	4	Alberto Costa	⋅	⋅	⋅	⋅	⋅	2018
(Angola)	5	Bento Gamba	24	PG	⋅	⋅	⋅	2018
(Angola)	10	Cândido Jorge	⋅	⋅	⋅	⋅	⋅	2018
(Angola)	13	Fernando Santos	⋅	⋅	⋅	⋅	⋅	2018
(Angola)	15	Heidi Camundonda	⋅	⋅	⋅	⋅	⋅	2018
(Angola)	6	Ivanilson Fontoura	⋅	⋅	⋅	⋅	⋅	2018
(Angola)	19	João Nunes	⋅	⋅	⋅	⋅	⋅	2018
(Angola)	8	João Oliveira	⋅	⋅	⋅	⋅	⋅	2018
(Angola)	9	Kelson Quengue	31	⋅	⋅	⋅	⋅	2018
(Angola)	12	Paulo André	⋅	⋅	⋅	⋅	⋅	2018
(Angola)	7	Paulo Bernardo	⋅	⋅	⋅	⋅	⋅	2018
(Angola)	11	Valdemar Lopes	30	SF	⋅	⋅	⋅	2018
(Angola)	16	Wilson Rafael	⋅	⋅	⋅	⋅	⋅	2018

== See also ==
- Angolan Basketball League
- Federação Angolana de Basquetebol
