= Felizardo Ambrósio =

Angolan basketball player

No. 9 – Primeiro de Agosto
- Position: Power forward
- League: BIC Basket; Africa Champions Cup

Personal information
- Born: 25 December 1987 (age 38) Luanda, Angola
- Listed height: 201 cm (6.59 ft)
- Listed weight: 97 kg (214 lb)

Career history
- 1999: Vila Clotilde
- 2000: ASA
- 2001: Sporting Luanda
- 2002–2004: ASA
- 2005–present: Primeiro de Agosto
Medals
Men's basketball
Representing Angola
AfroBasket
Gold medal – first place	Luanda 2007	National Team
Gold medal – first place	Benghazi 2009	National Team
Gold medal – first place	Antananarivo 2011	National Team
Gold medal – first place	Abidjan 2013	National Team
Silver medal – second place	Radès 2015	National Team
FIBA Africa Clubs Champions Cup
Gold medal – first place	Luanda 2007	1º de Agosto
Gold medal – first place	Sousse 2008	1º de Agosto
Gold medal – first place	Sousse 2013	1º de Agosto
Silver medal – second place	Salé 2011	1º de Agosto

Felizardo Silvestre Bumba Ambrósio (25 December 1987), nicknamed "Miller", is an Angolan basketball power forward. He is 6 ft 7 in (2.01 m) in height and 97 kg (215 pounds) in weight. He won a gold medal with the Angola national basketball team at the 2007 African Championship. Ambrosio also played in the 2008 Summer Olympics.

He is currently playing for Primeiro de Agosto at the Angolan major basketball league BAI Basket and at the Africa Champions Cup.

== See also ==
- Angola national basketball team
