= Lazare Adingono =

American basketball player

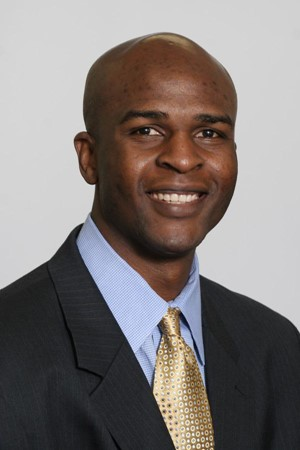
- Andinogo in 2008

Primeiro de Agosto
- Position: Head coach
- League: Angolan Basketball League

Personal information
- Born: January 11, 1978 (age 48) Yaoundé, Cameroon
- Listed height: 200 cm (6 ft 7 in)
- Listed weight: 89 kg (196 lb)

Career information
- College: Rhode Island (1999–2003)
- NBA draft: 2003: undrafted
- Playing career: 2003–2004
- Coaching career: 2006–present

Career history

Playing
- 2003–2004: Juárez Gallos de Pelea

Coaching
- 2006–2009: Canisius (assistant)
- 2007–2009: Cameroon
- 2012–2020: Petro de Luanda
- 2021: FAP
- 2022–present: Primeiro de Agosto

Career highlights
- As coach: FIBA Africa Clubs Champions Cup (2015); 2× Angolan League champion (2015, 2019); 2× Angolan Cup winner (2013, 2014)
Medals
Men's basketball
Representing Cameroon
FIBA Africa Championship
Silver medal – second place	Luanda 2007
Representing Angola
FIBA Africa Clubs Champions Cup
Gold medal – first place	Luanda 2015	Petro Atlético
Silver medal – second place	Malabo 2012	Petro Atlético

Lazare Adingono (or Lazare Adie Ngono; born 11 January 1978) is a Cameroonian-American former basketball player and current head coach of Primeiro de Agosto of the Angolan Basketball League.

== Playing career ==
Adingono played basketball at the University of Rhode Island from 1999 to 2003. In the 2002–03 season, Adingono was a co-captain and finished third on the team in scoring, with 11.8 points per game. He also was a member of the Cameroon national basketball team.

== Coaching career ==
Adingono coached the men's national team at the 2007 and 2009 FIBA Africa Championships. From 2006 to 2009, Adingono was an assistant coach for the Canisius Golden Griffins. In April 2009, Adingono left Canisius.

Adingono is an uncle of team Cameroon and Petro Atlético player Parfait Bitee.

From May 2012 until September 2020, Adingono was the head coach of Angolan side Petro Atlético. With Petro, he won one African continental title and two league titles.

He coached his native country again during the AfroBasket 2021 qualifiers.

In spring 2021, he signed as head coach of Cameroonian club FAP Basketball ahead of the 2021 BAL season.

On 17 June 2022, Primeiro de Agosto announced Adingono signed a two-year contract to become the club's head coach.

== Honours ==
=== As coach ===
Petro de Luanda

- 2x Angolan Basketball League: (2014–15, 2018–19)
- 2x Taça de Angola: (2013, 2014)
- FIBA Africa Clubs Champions Cup: (2015)
