= Vila Estoril =

- town
- Location in Angola
- Coordinates: 8.8842°S 13.2522°E
- Country: Angola
- Province: Luanda
- Time zone: UTC+1 (WAT)

Vila Estoril is a town in Angola, located in the province of Luanda.

== See also ==
- Communes of Angola
