= Kikas Gomes =

Angolan basketball player (born 1980)

Joaquim Gomes
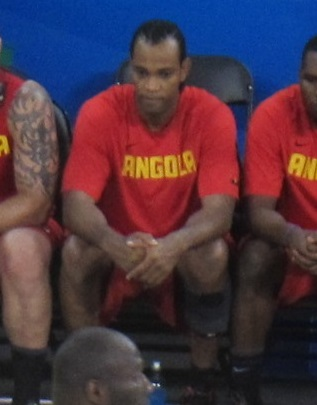
- Gomes in 2014

Personal information
- Born: December 23, 1980 (age 45) Luanda, Angola
- Listed height: 200 cm (6 ft 7 in)
- Listed weight: 100 kg (220 lb)

Career information
- College: Valparaiso (2000–2004)
- Playing career: 1998–2018
- Position: Power forward / center

Career history
- 1998–2000: Petro Atlético
- 2004–2005: RheinEnergie Köln
- 2005–2006: EiffelTowers Den Bosch
- 2006–2018: 1º de Agosto

Joaquim Brandão Gomes, also known as "Kikas", (born December 23, 1980) is a retired Angolan professional basketball player. He has played professionally in Germany and the Netherlands.

A 2 m (6 ft 6 1/2 in) in height, 100 kg (220 pounds) in weight center-power forward, Gomes was a stand out at Valparaiso University in Indiana, United States, where he played from 2000 to 2004. In 2005, he won the German basketball cup with RheinEnergie Köln. He also played for his country's national team in the 2004 Summer Olympics, 2006 FIBA World Championship, FIBA Africa Championship 2007.

He retired in 2017 at the age of 36, and was appointed sporting director at his longtime club 1º de Agosto.

== College career ==
Gomes played college basketball in the United States for Valparaiso. He had a career-high 23 points in the final of the Mid-Continent Conference tournament in the Crusaders' 75–70 win over IUPUI on March 9, 2004.

== Professional career ==
=== Petro de Luanda (1998–2000) ===
Gomes started his career with Petro de Luanda of the Angolan Basketball League where he played two seasons before moving to the United States.

=== RheinEnergie Köln (2004–2005) ===
In the 2004–05 season, Gomes played with RheinEnergie Köln of the Germann Basketball Bundesliga. He averaged 5.2 points and 3.0 rebounds in 28 games.

=== EiffelTowers Den Bosch (2005–2006) ===
Gomes played for EiffelTowers Den Bosch and averaged 10.4 points and 8.2 rebounds per game. He helped EiffelTowers win the Eredivisie championship.

=== Primeiro de Agosto (2006–2016) ===
Fromm 2006 to 2016, Gomes played ten seasons with Primeiro de Agosto of the Angolan Basketball League. He won five national championships and the FIBA Africa Club Champions Cup six times.

== Achievements ==
Petro de Luanda

- Angolan Basketball League: (1999)
- Taça de Angola: (2000)

RheinEnergie Köln

- BBL-Pokal: (2005)

EiffelTowers Den Bosch

- Eredivisie: (2006)

Primeiro de Agosto

- 5× Angolan Basketball League: (2008, 2009, 2010, 2013, 2016)
- 3× Angolan Basketball Cup: (2008, 2009, 2012)
- 6× FIBA Africa Club Champions Cup: (2007, 2008, 2009, 2010, 2012, 2013)

Angola

- AfroBasket Gold: (2005, 2007, 2009, 2013)

=== Individual awards ===
- 2× AfroBasket MVP: (2007, 2009)
- 2× FIBA Africa Club Champions Cup MVP: (2008, 2010)
- 4× FIBA Africa Club Champions Cup All-Star Team: (2007, 2008, 2010, 2013)
- Angolan Basketball League MVP: (2010)

== See also ==
- Angola national basketball team
