= Helmarc Academia =

- Leagues: Angolan Second Division
- Arena: Pavilhão Multiusos do Kilamba
- Capacity: 1,500
- Location: Luanda, Angola
- Head coach: Elvino Dias

Helmarc Academia, is an Angolan semi-professional basketball team. The club made its debut in the Angolan top basketball league in 2018. Helmarc was eight in the 2018–19 season.

== Season-by-season ==
Season	Place
2018–19	8th

== Players ==
Helmarc Basketball players

=== 2018 ===
Nat	#	Name	A	P	H	W	–	E.D.
Nat	#	Name	A	P	H	W	2017	2018
Nat	#	Name	A	P	H	W	–	–
(Angola)	4	Adilson Avelino	⋅	⋅	⋅	⋅	⋅	2018
(Angola)	16	Adilson Paulo	⋅	⋅	⋅	⋅	⋅	2018
(Angola)	11	Anax Kamernane	⋅	⋅	⋅	⋅	⋅	2018
(Angola)	14	André João Temo	⋅	⋅	⋅	⋅	⋅	2018
(Angola)	12	Cândido Madureira	⋅	PF	⋅	⋅	⋅	2018
(Angola)	9	David Avelino	28	SF	⋅	⋅	→	2018
(Angola)	6	Filipe Canjulo	⋅	⋅	⋅	⋅	⋅	2018
(Angola)	13	Gaspar Filipe	⋅	⋅	⋅	⋅	⋅	2018
(Angola)	7	Hélder Cristina	28	⋅	⋅	⋅	⋅	2018
(Angola)	10	João Avelino	25	⋅	⋅	⋅	⋅	2018
(Angola)	17	Ludjero Galiza	26	SF	2.02	⋅	→	2018
(Angola)	3	Manuel Nowa	28	PG	⋅	⋅	⋅	2018
(Angola)	5	Sílvio Ncanga	27	PF	⋅	⋅	→	2018

== See also ==
- Angolan Basketball League
- Federação Angolana de Basquetebol
