= Paulo Santana =

Angolan basketball player (born 1984)

Interclube
- Position: Point guard
- League: BIC Basket; Africa Champions Cup

Personal information
- Born: October 28, 1984 (age 42) Bengo, Angola
- Listed height: 185 cm (6.07 ft)
- Listed weight: 77 kg (170 lb)

Career information
- College: Southeastern CC (2002–2004); Acadia (2004–2007)
- NBA draft: 2007: undrafted

Career history
- 2000: Petro Atlético
- 2008–present: Petro Atlético
- 2016: Interclube
Medals
Men's basketball
Representing Angola
FIBA Africa Clubs Champions Cup
Gold medal – first place	Luanda 2015	Petro Atlético
Silver medal – second place	Kigali 2009	Petro Atlético
Silver medal – second place	Malabo 2012	Petro Atlético

Paulo Wandelson Afonso Santana (born October 28, 1984, in Bengo) is an Angolan professional basketball player.

A 1.85 m (6 ft 1 in) in height, point guard, Santana was named MVP at the 2006-2007 Canadian College Basketball Western Conference season. He also played for his country's national team in the 2004 Summer Olympics, 2006 FIBA World Championship, FIBA Africa Championship 2007.

== See also ==
- Angola national basketball team
