= C.D. Huíla (basketball) =

Clube Desportivo da Huíla
- Leagues: BAI Basket
- Founded: March 7, 1998; 28 years ago
- History: 1998 - present
- Arena: Pavilhão da N.Sra do Monte (capacity: 2,000)
- Location: Lubango, Huíla
- Team colors: white, maroon and black
- President: (Angola) José Duarte Dias Paím

The Clube Desportivo da Huíla, in short Desportivo da Huíla, has a basketball club that regularly competes in the Angolan basketball major league a.k.a. BAI Basket. The club, based in Lubango, Huíla, is attached and sponsored by the local branch of the armed forces. Desportivo da Huila also has a privileged relationship with Angolan sports giant C.D. Primeiro de Agosto.

== 2009-10 roster ==
Note: Flags indicate national team eligibility at FIBA-sanctioned events. Players may hold other non-FIBA nationalities not displayed.

C.D. Huíla (basketball) roster
Players
Coaches

| Pos. | No. | Nat. | Name | Ht. | Wt. | Age |
|---|---|---|---|---|---|---|
| N/A | 0 | (Angola) | Swingue, Yuri | 0 m (0 in) | 0 kg (0 lb) |
| N/A | 0 | (Angola) | Restino, Manuel | 0 m (0 in) | 0 kg (0 lb) |
| N/A | 0 | (Angola) | Santos, Adilson | 0 m (0 in) | 0 kg (0 lb) |
| N/A | 0 | (Angola) | Ndoniema, Edson | 0 m (0 in) | 0 kg (0 lb) |
| N/A | 0 | (Angola) | Nganga, Sílvio | 0 m (0 in) | 0 kg (0 lb) |
| N/A | 0 | (Angola) | Edson, Hilikilua | 0 m (0 in) | 0 kg (0 lb) |
| N/A | 0 | (Angola) | Bango, Gaspar | 0 m (0 in) | 0 kg (0 lb) |
| N/A | 0 | (Angola) | Carlos, Momo | 0 m (0 in) | 0 kg (0 lb) |
| N/A | 0 | (Angola) | Domingos, Waldemar | 0 m (0 in) | 0 kg (0 lb) |
| N/A | 0 | (Angola) | Graça, Samuel | 0 m (0 in) | 0 kg (0 lb) |

Head coach

- (Angola) Emanuel Trovoada

Legend

- (C) Team captain
- Injured

- Roster
Updated: June 13, 2012

Updated as of 20 May 2010

== See also ==
- Desportivo da Huíla Football
