= Reggie Moore =

Basketball player (1981–2023)

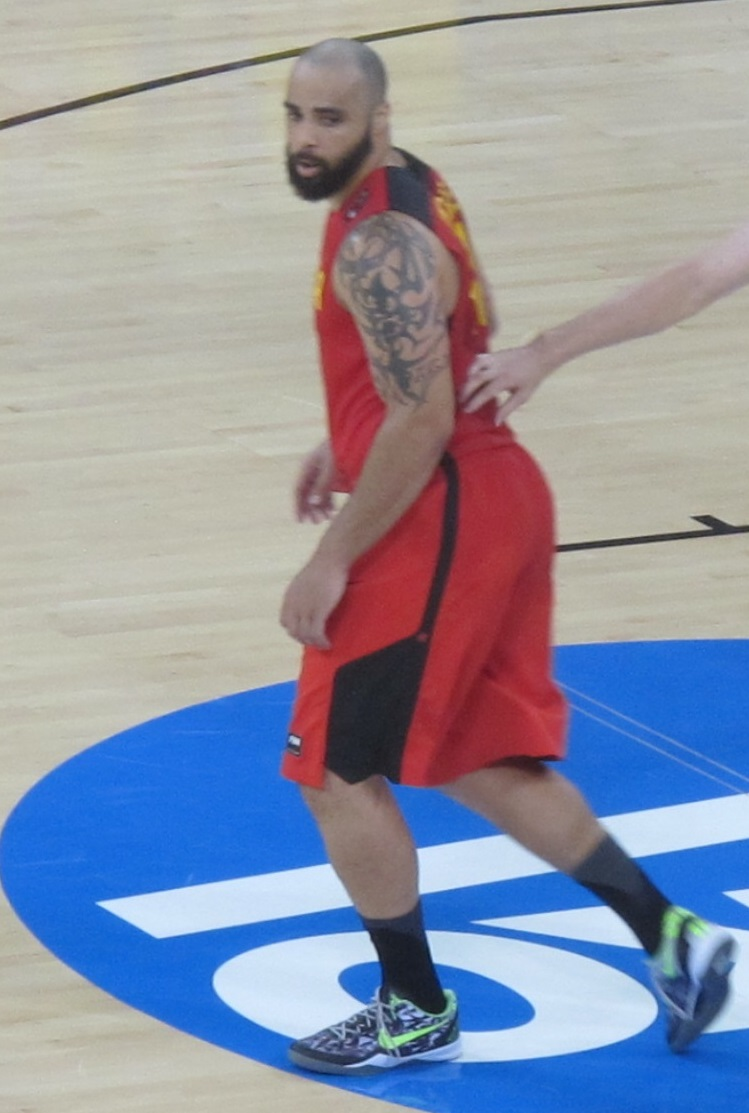
- Moore in 2014

Personal information
- Born: March 31, 1981 Lemoore, California, U.S.
- Died: June 12, 2023 (aged 42) Luanda, Angola
- Listed height: 203 cm (6.66 ft)
- Listed weight: 107 kg (236 lb)

Career information
- High school: Lemoore (Lemoore, California)
- College: LA Harbor College (1999–2001); Oral Roberts (2001–2003)
- NBA draft: 2003: undrafted
- Playing career: 2003–2018
- Position: Power forward

Career history
- 2003: BF Copenhagen
- 2004–2005: Belenenses
- 2006–2007: LTi Gießen 46ers
- 2006–2007: Maccabi Givat Shmuel
- 2006–2007: Maccabi Rishon LeZion
- 2007–2008: UB La Palma
- 2008–2009: Illescas
- 2009–2011: Recreativo do Libolo
- 2012–2015: Primeiro de Agosto
- 2015–2018: Petro de Luanda
- 2018: Galitos-Barreiro

Career highlights
- Angolan League champion (2013); 2× Angolan Supercup champion (2014, 2015)
Medals
Men's basketball
Representing Angola
AfroBasket
Gold medal – first place	Abidjan 2013	National Team
Silver medal – second place	Radès 2015	National Team
African Games
Gold medal – first place	Brazzaville 2015	National Team
FIBA Africa Clubs Champions Cup
Gold medal – first place	Malabo 2012	1º de Agosto
Gold medal – first place	Luanda 2015	Petro Atlético
Silver medal – second place	Salé 2011	1º de Agosto

Reginal Dennis Benjamin Moore (March 31, 1981 – June 12, 2023) was an American-born Angolan basketball player. A 6 ft 6 in (1.98 m) power forward, attended from Oral Roberts University in Tulsa, Oklahoma from 2001-2003. He played in Norway, United States Basketball League (USBL; under coach John Starks), Germany, and Portugal. He has a daughter, Makayla Moore who is a university student and lives in Texas. He has a son named Maverick that lives in Angola.

In 2012, Moore was granted Angolan citizenship, thus being eligible to play for the Angolan national squad. He is only the second U.S. citizen in the history of the country's existence to ever be granted Angolan nationality.

Moore died in Luanda on June 12, 2023, at the age of 42.

== Achievements ==
- 2012–2013 – BAI Basket 2013 champion with Primeiro de Agosto
- 2012–2013 – BAI Basket 2013 Top 3-point shooter
- 2011–2012 – Africa Club Champion with Primeiro de Agosto
- 2009–2010 – BAI Basket 2010 Top Scorer
- 2006 & 2007 – Relegated to the National League with Givate Shmuel
- 2005 & 2006 – Voted player of the year in Portugal's TMN
- 2005 & 2006 – Led the TMN (Portugal) League in scoring in (22.2 ppg)
- 2004 & 2005 – Voted twice to Portugal's All-Star Game
- 2003–2004 – Voted 1st Team All-Norwegian League
