= Leonel Paulo =

Angolan basketball player (born 1986)

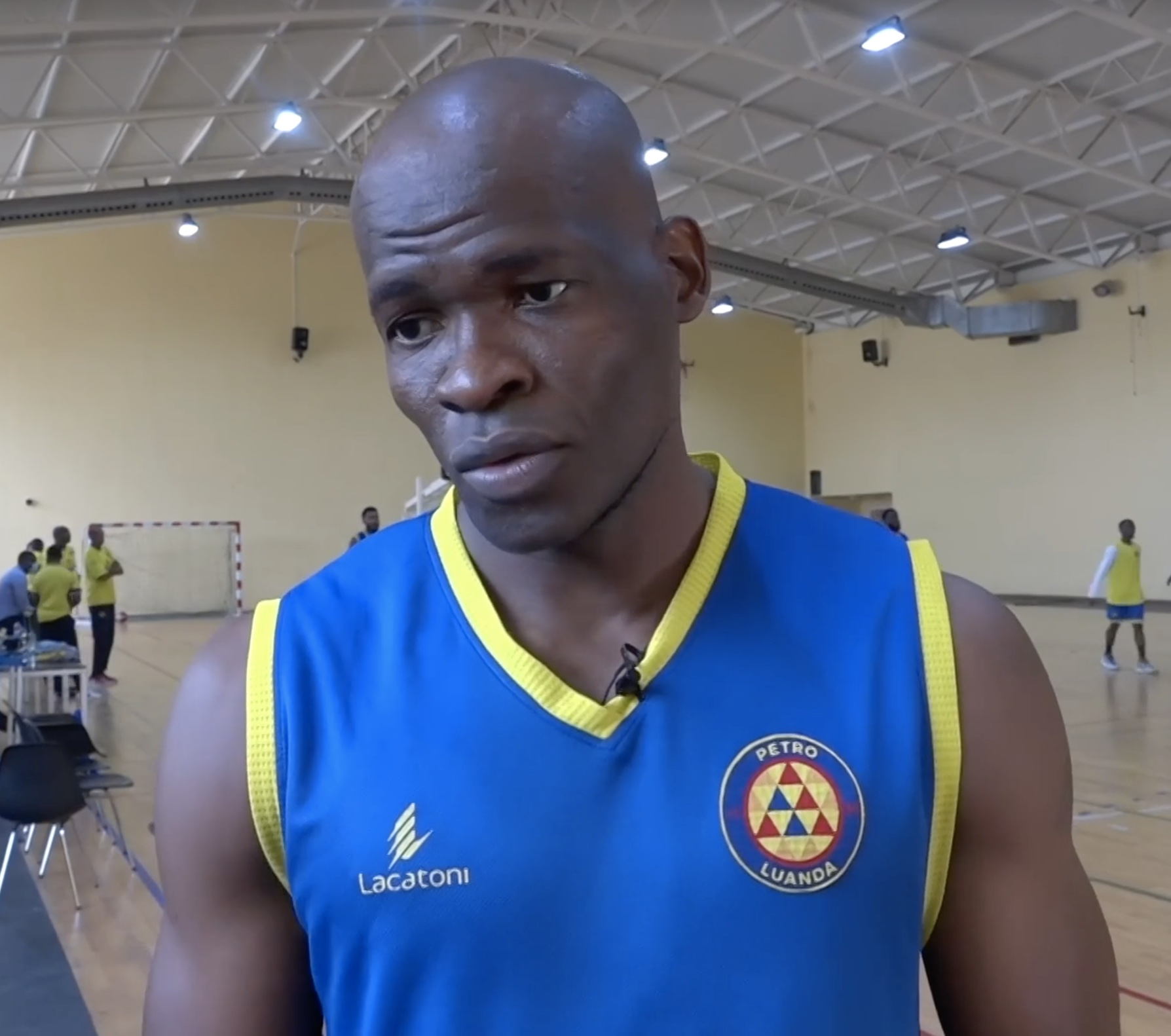
- Paulo with Petro de Luanda in 2022

Free agent
- Position: Power forward
- League: Portuguese Basketball League

Personal information
- Born: 30 April 1986 (age 40) Luanda, Angola
- Listed height: 1.98 m (6 ft 6 in)
- Listed weight: 114 kg (251 lb)

Career history
- n/a – 2003: Vila Clotilde
- 2004–2008: Petro Atlético
- 2008–2011: Recreativo do Libolo
- 2011–2012: Primeiro de Agosto
- 2012–2022: Petro de Luanda
- 2022–2023: Sangalhos DC

Career highlights
- 2× FIBA Africa Champions Cup champion (2006, 2015); FIBA Africa Champions Cup All-Star Team (2015); 6× Angolan League champion (2006, 2007, 2015, 2019, 2021, 2022); 8× Angolan Cup winner (2004, 2007, 2010–2014, 2022); 4× Angolan Super Cup winner (2006, 2015, 2019, 2021); Angolan League MVP (2015); Angolan League scoring champion (2015)
Medals
Men's basketball
Representing Angola
AfroBasket
Gold medal – first place	Benghazi 2009	National Team
Gold medal – first place	Abidjan 2013	National Team
Silver medal – second place	Antananarivo 2011	National Team
Silver medal – second place	Radès 2015	National Team
African Games
Gold medal – first place	Algiers 2007	National Team
FIBA Africa Clubs Champions Cup
Gold medal – first place	Lagos 2006	Petro Atlético
Gold medal – first place	Luanda 2015	Petro Atlético
Silver medal – second place	Luanda 2007	Petro Atlético
Silver medal – second place	Salé 2011	1º de Agosto
Silver medal – second place	Malabo 2012	Petro Atlético

Leonel Ditutala Paulo (born 30 April 1986) is an Angolan basketball player who last played for Sangalhos DC and formerly for the Angola national team. Standing at 6 ft 6 in (1.98 m), he plays as power forward. Paulo is one of the most decorated players currently active, having won six Angolan League titles, including MVP honours in 2015.

He had his most successful stints with Petro de Luanda, where he was the club's captain and played a total of fourteen seasons, from 2004 to 2008 and 2012 to 2022. Since then, he has been a free agent. Paulo joined his first foreign club, Sangalhos DC in Portugal, signing a one-year contract in November 2022.

Paulo played for and captained Angola at various international competitions, including the team at the 2008 Summer Olympics. He also won two AfroBasket championships with his country, in 2009 and 2013.

== BAL career statistics ==
Legend
GP	Games played	GS	Games started	MPG	Minutes per game
FG%	Field goal percentage	3P%	3-point field goal percentage	FT%	Free throw percentage
RPG	Rebounds per game	APG	Assists per game	SPG	Steals per game
BPG	Blocks per game	PPG	Points per game	**Bold**	Career high

Year	Team	GP	GS	MPG	FG%	3P%	FT%	RPG	APG	SPG	BPG	PPG
2021	Petro de Luanda	6	1	15.3	.447	.182	.429	2.5	1.5	.5	.2	6.5
Career		6	1	15.3	.447	.182	.429	2.5	1.5	.5	.2	6.5
