= C.D. Universidade Agostinho Neto (basketball) =

C.D. Univerdidade Agostinho Neto
- Nickname: Os Universitários
- Leagues: BAI Basket
- Arena: Pavilhão Anexo (capacity: 1,500)
- Location: Luanda, Angola
- Team colors: white, maroon and black
- President: (Angola) Orlando da Mata

The Clube Desportivo Universidade Agostinho Neto or simply CDUAN, formerly Centro Desportivo Universitário de Angola or CDUA, is a semi-professional basketball club from Luanda, Angola. On March 3, 2005, a decision was made by a General Assembly meeting that the club's name - Centro Desportivo Universitário de Angola (CDUA) - be changed to the current name. The club is attached and sponsored by the state-run Agostinho Neto University, with the university chancellor serving as the club's chairman.
