= Carlos Almeida (basketball) =

Angolan basketball player (born 1976)

Personal information
- Born: 24 September 1976 (age 50) Luanda, Angola
- Listed height: 193 cm (6.33 ft)
- Listed weight: 91 kg (201 lb)

Career information
- Playing career: 1987–2014
- Position: Shooting guard

Career history
- 1984–1987: E.R.T.
- 1987–2001: Petro Atlético
- 2001–2014: Primeiro de Agosto

Carlos Domingues Bendinha de Almeida (born 24 September 1976) is an Angolan professional basketball shooting guard and a member of the Angola national basketball team. He is 6 ft 4 in (1.93 m) in height and 91 kg (200 pounds) in weight. Almeida played for Angola at the 2000 and the 2004 Summer Olympics, the 2002 and 2006 basketball world championship as well as the 2005, 2007 Africa championships and 2009 Africa championship.

In addition to playing basketball, he has been serving a second term as a member of the Angolan parliament, representing the ruling party, MPLA.

Carlos Almeida has won seven FIBA Africa Championship titles.

On 17 April 2014, Almeida played his last official game in the 1st leg of the 2014 Angola Basketball Cup against Petro de Luanda, a match involving the two most important clubs in his career. At the end of the game, honours were paid to him for his long, successful basketball career.
