= F.C. Vila Clotilde =

Vila Clotilde FC
- Leagues: Angolan League
- Founded: 25 March 1953; 72 years ago
- Arena: Pavilhão Anexo
- Capacity: 1,500
- Location: Luanda, Angola
- President: Carlos Ferreira
- Head coach: Elvino Dias
- 2018–19 position: Angolan League, 7th of 9

Futebol Clube Vila Clotilde is an Angolan basketball club based in the Luanda. Based in the Maculusso neighbourhood, they are one of the most traditional and ancient basketball clubs in the country, the club was founded as an affiliate to Portugal's F.C. Barreirense and currently features the sports of basketball and karate, of which the former has been a regular contestant at the Angolan Basketball League.

During the colonial period, the club has won the district basketball championship of Angola ten times. In 2025, Vila Clotilde played in the Angolan Cup.

Several Angolan national team players, such as Leonel Paulo, Pedro Bastos and Gerson Domingos have started their career at Vila Clotilde.

== Honours ==
Angolan Basketball League

- Semi-finalist: 2022–23

Taça de Angola

- Runners-up: 2024–25

== Roster ==
Note: Flags indicate national team eligibility at FIBA-sanctioned events. Players may hold other non-FIBA nationalities not displayed.

Vila Clotilde FC roster
Players
Coaches

Pos.	No.	Nat.	Name	Ht.	Wt.	Age
	4	(Angola)	Ademiro João			32 – 7 August 1993
	5	(Angola)	Adilson Santos			38 – 9 February 1987
	6	(Angola)	Mário Oliveira			37 – 13 April 1988
	7	(Angola)	Bartolomeu Pacheco			36 – 9 June 1989
	8	(Angola)	Júlio Machado			36 – 4 August 1989
	9	(Angola)	David Avelino			35 – 17 July 1990
	10	(Angola)	Mário Samba			32 – 5 October 1992
	11	(Angola)	João Avelino			32 – 17 May 1993
	12	(Angola)	Garrido Pertence			33 – 11 October 1991
	13	(Angola)	Gilson Martins			32 – 12 October 1992
	14	(Angola)	Goldafim Freitas			32 – 25 February 1993
	15	(Angola)	Adriano José			38 – 14 October 1986
		(Angola)	Orlando Sunga			33 – 13 September 1991
		(Angola)	Daniel Manuel			28 – 24 January 1997
		(Angola)	Geraldo Santos			27 – 1 May 1998
		(Angola)	Cristiano Pedro			32 – 14 January 1993

Head coach

- (Angola) Elvino Dias

Assistant coach(es)

- (Angola) João Baptista

Team manager

- (Angola) Fernando Sousa

Legend

- (C) Team captain
- Injured

Updated as of March 23rd, 2016

== Players ==
FC Vila Clotilde Basketball players

=== 2014–2018 ===
Nat	#	Name	A	P	H	W	Elvino Dias				–
Nat	#	Name	A	P	H	W	2014	2015	2016	2017	2018
Nat	#	Name	A	P	H	W	6	–	–	–	–
(Angola)	–	Acácio António	⋅	⋅	⋅		⋅	⋅	⋅	⋅	2018
(Angola)	⋅	Ademiro João	24	C	⋅		⋅	⋅	4	2017	⋅
(Angola)	⋅	Adalberto Major	⋅	PF	⋅		⋅	⋅	⋅	2017	⋅
(Angola)	5	Adilson Santos	31	G	⋅		–	5	5	→	2018
(Angola)	⋅	Adriano José	30	F	⋅		–	15	15	⋅	⋅
(Angola)	15	Aldair Carlos	⋅	⋅	⋅		⋅	⋅	⋅	⋅	2018
(Angola)	⋅	Alexandre Jungo	18	C	1.98		–	13	→	⋅	⋅
(Angola)	⋅	André Temo	⋅	PG	⋅		⋅	⋅	⋅	2017	⋅
(Angola)	6	António Domingos	⋅	⋅	⋅		⋅	⋅	⋅	⋅	2018
(Angola)	⋅	Bartolomeu Pacheco	27	G	⋅		–	7	7	⋅	⋅
(Angola)	⋅	Cardoso Casimiro	37	C	⋅		–	41	→	⋅	⋅
(Angola)	13	Carlos Silva	⋅	⋅	⋅		⋅	⋅	⋅	⋅	2018
(Angola)	⋅	Cristiano Pedro	23	⋅	⋅		⋅	⋅	–	⋅	⋅
(Angola)	⋅	Daniel Manuel	19	⋅	⋅		⋅	⋅	–	⋅	⋅
(Angola)	⋅	David Avelino	26	SF	⋅		–	9	9	2017	→
(Angola)	⋅	David Manuel	⋅	SG	⋅		⋅	⋅	⋅	2017	⋅
(Angola)	–	David Palance	⋅	⋅	⋅		⋅	⋅	⋅	⋅	2018
(Angola)	11	Eduardo Kiabola Nsianfumo	24	⋅	⋅		⋅	⋅	⋅	⋅	2018
(Angola)	14	Escórcio António	⋅	⋅	⋅		⋅	⋅	⋅	⋅	2018
(Angola)	⋅	Evaldo Castro	⋅	G	⋅		–	6	⋅	⋅	⋅
(Angola)	⋅	Fidel Cabita	29	C	2.06		–	→	⋅	⋅	⋅
(Angola)	20	Francisco Gomes	⋅	⋅	⋅		⋅	⋅	⋅	⋅	2018
(Angola)	12	Garrido Pertence	25	⋅	⋅		⋅	⋅	12	⋅	2018
(Angola)	⋅	Geraldo Santos	18	⋅	⋅		⋅	⋅	–	⋅	⋅
(Angola)	⋅	Gerson Domingos	19	G	⋅		–	8	→	⋅	⋅
(Angola)	⋅	Gilson Martins	24	⋅	⋅		⋅	⋅	13	→	⋅
(Angola)	⋅	Goldafim Freitas	23	⋅	⋅		⋅	⋅	14	→	⋅
(Angola)	⋅	João Avelino	23	⋅	⋅		⋅	⋅	11	⋅	⋅
(Angola)	⋅	João Baptista	30	⋅	⋅		⋅	11	⋅	⋅	⋅
(Angola)	16	João Elias	⋅	⋅	⋅		⋅	⋅	⋅	⋅	2018
(Angola)	18	José Fula	⋅	⋅	⋅		⋅	⋅	⋅	⋅	2018
(Angola)	8	Júlio Machado	29	⋅	⋅		⋅	12	8	⋅	2018
(Angola)	10	Márcio Samba	26	⋅	⋅		⋅	10	10	⋅	2018
(Angola)	⋅	Mário Oliveira	28	⋅	⋅		⋅	⋅	6	⋅	⋅
(Angola)	4	Mário Oliveira	⋅	⋅	⋅		⋅	⋅	⋅	⋅	2018
(Angola)	⋅	Nivaldo Sumbo	33	C	⋅		–	⋅	⋅	⋅	⋅
(Angola)	⋅	Olêncio Ndatipo		⋅	⋅		⋅	4	→	⋅	⋅
(Angola)	⋅	Orlando Sunga	25	F	⋅		–	⋅	–	⋅	⋅
(Angola)	17	Ramalho Lemos	⋅	⋅	⋅		⋅	⋅	⋅	⋅	2018
(Angola)	9	Teodoro Hilário	⋅	⋅	⋅		⋅	⋅	⋅	⋅	2018
(Angola)	19	Willer Pereira	⋅	⋅	⋅		⋅	⋅	⋅	⋅	2018
(Angola)	–	Wilson Manuel	⋅	⋅	⋅		⋅	⋅	⋅	⋅	2018

== See also ==
- BIC Basket
- Federação Angolana de Basquetebol
