= 2015 FIBA Africa Clubs Champions Cup squads =

This article displays the rosters for the participating teams at the 2015 FIBA Africa Club Championship.

== (Egypt) Al Gezira Cairo ==
Al Gezira Cairo – 2015 FIBA Africa Clubs Champions Cup – 6th place roster
| Players | | | | | | | Coaches |
| Pos | # | Nat | Name | Height | Weight | Age | Head Coach |
| PG | 0 | (United States) | Daryl Dorsey | 1.83 m (6 ft 0 in) | | 5 August 1981 (aged 34) | (Egypt) Tarek Aly |
| SG | 3 | (Egypt) | Tamer Shahin | 1.88 m (6 ft 2 in) | | 5 July 1982 (aged 33) |
| SF | 4 | (Egypt) | Romeh Ali | 2.00 m (6 ft 6 1/2 in) | | 30 May 1994 (aged 21) | Assistant coach(es) |
| SF | 5 | (Egypt) | Amr Gendy | 1.96 m (6 ft 5 in) | | 14 June 1991 (aged 24) |
| PF | 8 | (Egypt) | Mohamed Desouky | 2.04 m (6 ft 8 1/2 in) | | 7 February 1990 (aged 25) |
| PF | 9 | (Egypt) | Ahmed Abdel | 2.06 m (6 ft 9 in) | | 8 March 1975 (aged 40) |
| C | 10 | (Egypt) | Tarek El Ghannam | 2.10 m (6 ft 10 1/2 in) | | 6 October 1978 (aged 37) |
| C | 11 | (Egypt) | Salaheldin Mohammed | 2.10 m (6 ft 10 1/2 in) | | 4 August 1985 (aged 30) |
| SF | 12 | (Egypt) | Eslam Mohamed | 1.90 m (6 ft 3 in) | | 27 July 1983 (aged 32) |
| PF | 13 | (Egypt) | Ahmed Baraka | 1.98 m (6 ft 6 in) | | 9 February 1989 (aged 26) |
| PG | 14 | (Egypt) | Motaz Okasha | 1.90 m (6 ft 3 in) | | 14 February 1990 (aged 25) |
| SF | 22 | (United States) | Mildon Ambres | 1.98 m (6 ft 6 in) | 97 kg (214 lb) | 12 September 1984 (aged 31) |

== (Cape Verde) AD Bairro ==
AD Bairro – 2015 FIBA Africa Clubs Champions Cup – 8th place roster
| Players | | | | | | | Coaches |
| Pos | # | Nat | Name | Height | Weight | Age | Head Coach |
| SG | 5 | (Cape Verde) | Erikson Duarte | 1.90 m (6 ft 3 in) | | 2 January 1988 (aged 27) | (Cape Verde) Hélio Varela |
| SF | 6 | (Cape Verde) | Patrick Abreu | 1.90 m (6 ft 3 in) | | 20 March 1991 (aged 24) |
| PG | 7 | (Cape Verde) | Braima Freire | 1.84 m (6 ft 1/2 in) | | 19 January 1982 (aged 33) | Assistant coach(es) |
| SF | 8 | (Cape Verde) | Mário Correia | 1.90 m (6 ft 3 in) | | 17 March 1978 (aged 37) |
| SG | 9 | (Cape Verde) | Fidel Mendonça | 1.91 m (6 ft 3 in) | | 7 July 1984 (aged 31) |
| SG | 10 | (Cape Verde) | Admir Mendes | 1.85 m (6 ft 1 in) | | 30 January 1988 (aged 27) |
| C | 11 | (Cape Verde) | Aílton Marques | 2.00 m (6 ft 6 1/2 in) | | 18 September 1995 (aged 20) |
| SG | 12 | (Cape Verde) | Patrick Lima | 1.93 m (6 ft 4 in) | | 2 May 1995 (aged 20) |
| C | 13 | (Cape Verde) | Abdulay Faty | 2.05 m (6 ft 8 1/2 in) | | 14 January 1985 (aged 30) |
| PF | 14 | (Cape Verde) | Nílton Gomes | 2.04 m (6 ft 8 1/2 in) | | 22 March 1987 (aged 28) |
| PF | 15 | (Cape Verde) | Amaro Rocha | 2.02 m (6 ft 7 1/2 in) | | 11 October 1988 (aged 27) |
| PF | 16 | (Cape Verde) | Isaías Galvão | 1.99 m (6 ft 6 1/2 in) | | 27 June 1995 (aged 20) |

== (Madagascar) ASCUT d'Atsinanana ==
ASCUT d'Atsinanana – 2015 FIBA Africa Clubs Champions Cup – 10th place roster
| Players | | | | | | | Coaches |
| Pos | # | Nat | Name | Height | Weight | Age | Head Coach |
| PG | 1 | (Madagascar) | Aimé Rakotomiaramanana | 1.72 m (5 ft 7 1/2 in) | | 12 April 1996 (aged 19) | (Madagascar) Herilanto Andriamanalina |
| PF | 3 | (Madagascar) | Ndrasana Randriana | 1.86 m (6 ft 1 in) | | 6 May 1985 (aged 30) |
| PG | 5 | (Madagascar) | Mbolaniaina Ramamonjisoa | 1.72 m (5 ft 7 1/2 in) | | 14 September 1995 (aged 20) | Assistant coach(es) |
| PG | 6 | (Madagascar) | Andrinisainana Mitondrasoa | 1.70 m (5 ft 7 in) | | 12 May 1983 (aged 32) |
| SF | 7 | (Madagascar) | Anthony Ranaivosoa | 1.80 m (5 ft 11 in) | | 5 March 1991 (aged 24) |
| PF | 11 | (Madagascar) | Johanson Randrianaivo | 1.86 m (6 ft 1 in) | | 16 May 1985 (aged 30) |
| C | 12 | (Madagascar) | Evrard Fataka | 1.96 m (6 ft 5 in) | | 7 December 1987 (aged 28) |
| C | 20 | (Comoros) | Ibrahim Ahmed | 2.06 m (6 ft 9 in) | | 20 August 1988 (aged 27) |
| SF | 22 | (Madagascar) | Romule Razafimahasahy | 1.90 m (6 ft 3 in) | | 22 April 1988 (aged 27) |
| PF | 28 | (Madagascar) | Vallery Botou | 1.94 m (6 ft 4 1/2 in) | | 14 February 1991 (aged 24) |
| PF | 35 | (Madagascar) | Kiady Rabarijoelina | 1.95 m (6 ft 5 in) | | 16 May 1997 (aged 18) |
| SG | 99 | (Madagascar) | Lalason Ratsimbazafy | 1.93 m (6 ft 4 in) | | 16 June 1992 (aged 23) |

== (Tunisia) Étoile Sportive Radès ==
ES Radès – 2015 FIBA Africa Clubs Champions Cup – 5th place roster
| Players | | | | | | | Coaches |
| Pos | # | Nat | Name | Height | Weight | Age | Head Coach |
| PG | 4 | (Tunisia) | Omar Abada | 1.88 m (6 ft 2 in) | | 20 April 1993 (aged 22) | (Tunisia) Safouane Ferjani |
| SG | 5 | (United States) | Smush Parker | 1.93 m (6 ft 4 in) | 86 kg (190 lb) | 1 June 1981 (aged 34) |
| SG | 6 | (Tunisia) | Mohamed Ilehi | 1.85 m (6 ft 1 in) | | 24 December 1993 (aged 21) | Assistant coach(es) |
| SF | 7 | (Tunisia) | Youssef Gaddour | 2.03 m (6 ft 8 in) | | 15 March 1990 (aged 25) |
| PG | 8 | (Tunisia) (France) | Marouan Kechrid | 1.78 m (5 ft 10 in) | 77 kg (170 lb) | 2 June 1981 (aged 34) |
| PF | 9 | (Tunisia) | Mohamed Abbassi | 2.02 m (6 ft 7 1/2 in) | | 28 March 1991 (aged 24) |
| PF | 10 | (Tunisia) | Zouhaier Snoussi | 1.97 m (6 ft 5 1/2 in) | | 15 May 1981 (aged 34) |
| SF | 11 | (Tunisia) | Mohamed Maghrebi | 1.96 m (6 ft 5 in) | | 31 July 1984 (aged 31) |
| C | 12 | (United States) | Christopher Lee | 2.06 m (6 ft 9 in) | | 9 January 1985 (aged 30) |
| C | 13 | (Tunisia) | Ahmed Smaali | 2.02 m (6 ft 7 1/2 in) | | 26 June 1987 (aged 28) |
| SG | 14 | (Tunisia) | Amrou Bouallegue | 1.89 m (6 ft 2 1/2 in) | | 24 December 1995 (aged 19) |
| PF | 15 | (Tunisia) | Amine Rzig | 1.98 m (6 ft 6 in) | | 25 August 1980 (aged 35) |

== (Morocco) Far Rabat ==
AS Far Rabat – 2015 FIBA Africa Clubs Champions Cup – Bronze medal roster
| Players | | | | | | | Coaches |
| Pos | # | Nat | Name | Height | Weight | Age | Head Coach |
| PF | 4 | (Morocco) | Hamza Foulani | 1.99 m (6 ft 6 1/2 in) | | 8 December 1993 (aged 22) | (Morocco) Labib El Hamrani |
| PG | 5 | (Morocco) | Mustapha Khalfi | 1.78 m (5 ft 10 in) | | 1 January 1980 (aged 35) |
| SF | 6 | (Morocco) | Achraf El Moussaoui | 1.94 m (6 ft 4 1/2 in) | | 11 January 1987 (aged 28) | Assistant coach(es) |
| SG | 7 | (Morocco) | Zouhair Benaija | 1.84 m (6 ft 1/2 in) | | 3 September 1999 (aged 16) |
| SG | 8 | (Morocco) | Jihad Benchlikha | 1.86 m (6 ft 1 in) | | 6 January 1991 (aged 24) |
| PG | 9 | (Morocco) | Mourad Shifi | 1.81 m (5 ft 11 1/2 in) | | 20 April 1985 (aged 30) |
| SF | 10 | (Morocco) | Houcine Oussen | 1.86 m (6 ft 1 in) | | 30 November 1981 (aged 34) |
| PF | 11 | (Senegal) | Abdoulaye Sow | 2.04 m (6 ft 8 1/2 in) | | 28 January 1978 (aged 37) |
| C | 12 | (Morocco) | Omar Laânani | 2.07 m (6 ft 9 1/2 in) | | 26 March 1987 (aged 28) |
| SG | 13 | (Morocco) | Salah Bellat | 1.89 m (6 ft 2 1/2 in) | | 11 November 1987 (aged 28) |
| SF | 14 | (Cameroon) | Frank Bakala | 1.94 m (6 ft 4 1/2 in) | | 15 April 1992 (aged 23) |
| C | 15 | (Morocco) | Amine Jobbid | 2.05 m (6 ft 8 1/2 in) | | 27 April 1983 (aged 32) |

== (Republic of the Congo) Inter Club Brazzaville ==
Inter Club Brazzaville – 2015 FIBA Africa Clubs Champions Cup – 9th place roster
| Players | | | | | | | Coaches |
| Pos | # | Nat | Name | Height | Weight | Age | Head Coach |
| SG | 4 | (Republic of the Congo) | Christ Mossaye | | | 20 February 1985 (aged 30) | (Republic of the Congo) Benjamin Boundzanga |
| PG | 5 | (Republic of the Congo) | Franck Sow | | | 16 April 1988 (aged 27) |
| C | 6 | (Republic of the Congo) (Ukraine) | Fréderich Mongo | | | 9 December 1981 (aged 34) | Assistant coach(es) |
| PF | 7 | (Republic of the Congo) | Régis Akiana | | | 27 June 1988 (aged 27) |
| PG | 8 | (Republic of the Congo) | Hervé Wande | | | 16 February 1982 (aged 33) |
| SF | 9 | (Republic of the Congo) | Japhie Nguia | 1.88 m (6 ft 2 in) | | 24 March 1992 (aged 23) |
| G | 10 | (Republic of the Congo) | Medhie Mouesse | 1.79 m (5 ft 10 1/2 in) | | 12 April 1993 (aged 22) |
| SF | 11 | (Republic of the Congo) | James Bopaka | | | 17 January 1992 (aged 23) |
| PF | 12 | (Republic of the Congo) | Chanel Mbongo | | | 16 July 1988 (aged 27) |
| C | 13 | (Republic of the Congo) | Sullyvane Kibozi | | | 1 June 1995 (aged 20) |
| SF | 14 | (Republic of the Congo) | Benjeny Yoa | | | 28 October 1992 (aged 23) |
| C | 15 | (Republic of the Congo) (Central African Republic) | Romaric Kondzy | 2.00 m (6 ft 6 1/2 in) | | 12 December 1980 (aged 35) |

== (Nigeria) Kano Pillars ==
Kano Pillars – 2015 FIBA Africa Clubs Champions Cup – 7th place roster
| Players | | | | | | | Coaches |
| Pos | # | Nat | Name | Height | Weight | Age | Head Coach |
| | 4 | (Nigeria) | Eli Dung | | | 14 October 1994 (aged 21) | (Nigeria) Sani Ahmed |
| | 5 | (Nigeria) | Abdulwahad Yakubu | | | 6 May 1990 (aged 25) |
| SG | 6 | (Nigeria) | Ibrahim Yusuf | 1.96 m (6 ft 5 in) | | 4 May 1989 (aged 26) | Assistant coach(es) |
| | 7 | (Nigeria) | Dele Ademola | | | 11 January 1989 (aged 26) |
| | 8 | (Nigeria) | Mathew Onmonya | | | 29 November 1986 (aged 29) |
| | 9 | (Nigeria) | Adeolo Oju | | | 9 August 1991 (aged 24) |
| | 10 | (Nigeria) | Opeyemi Oyeniyi | | | 10 October 1991 (aged 24) |
| | 11 | (Nigeria) | Oche Omaga | 2.11 m (6 ft 11 in) | | 2 June 1982 (aged 33) |
| | 12 | (Nigeria) | Mustapha Yusuf | | | 7 June 1986 (aged 29) |
| | 13 | (Nigeria) | Sadiq Adedeji | | | 24 October 1994 (aged 21) |
| C | 14 | (Nigeria) | Cyril Awere | | | 2 January 1985 (aged 30) |
| | 15 | (Nigeria) | Adebayo Adeniyi | | | 5 March 1991 (aged 24) |

== (Angola) Petro Atlético ==
Petro Atlético – 2015 FIBA Africa Clubs Champions Cup – Gold Medal roster
| Players | | | | | | | Coaches |
| Pos | # | Nat | Name | Height | Weight | Age | Head Coach |
| SG | 4 | (Angola) | Pedro Bastos | 1.93 m (6 ft 4 in) | 87 kg (192 lb) | 8 January 1993 (aged 22) | (United States) (Cameroon) Lazare Adingono |
| SG | 7 | (Angola) | Délcio Ucuahamba | 1.96 m (6 ft 5 in) | 92 kg (203 lb) | 12 December 1992 (aged 23) |
| PF | 8 | (Angola) (United States) | Reggie Moore | 2.02 m (6 ft 7 1/2 in) | 107 kg (236 lb) | 31 March 1981 (aged 34) | Assistant coach(es) |
| PG | 10 | (Canada) (Angola) | Paulo Santana | 1.85 m (6 ft 1 in) | 77 kg (170 lb) | 28 April 1984 (aged 31) | (Angola) Gerson Betel |
| C | 11 | (Angola) | Teotónio Dó | 2.06 m (6 ft 9 in) | 109 kg (240 lb) | 20 March 1994 (aged 21) | (Angola) Benjamim Avô |
| PG | 12 | (Dominican Republic) (United States) | Manny Quezada | 1.84 m (6 ft 1/2 in) | 84 kg (185 lb) | 13 April 1985 (aged 30) |
| SF | 13 | (Angola) | Leonel Paulo | 1.97 m (6 ft 5 1/2 in) | 93 kg (205 lb) | 30 April 1986 (aged 29) |
| PG | 14 | (Angola) | Domingos Bonifácio | 1.86 m (6 ft 1 in) | 83 kg (183 lb) | 28 October 1984 (aged 31) |
| C | 16 | (Angola) | Hermenegildo Mbunga | 2.04 m (6 ft 8 1/2 in) | 109 kg (240 lb) | 4 September 1985 (aged 30) |
| PG | 17 | (Angola) | Joaquim Pedro | 1.82 m (5 ft 11 1/2 in) | 80 kg (180 lb) | 9 February 1995 (aged 20) |
| SG | 18 | (Angola) | Gerson Gonçalves | 1.92 m (6 ft 3 1/2 in) | 78 kg (172 lb) | 29 March 1996 (aged 19) |
| C | 23 | (United States) | Jason Cain | 2.07 m (6 ft 9 1/2 in) | 107 kg (236 lb) | 31 March 1985 (aged 30) |

== (Angola) Primeiro de Agosto ==
Primeiro de Agosto – 2015 FIBA Africa Clubs Champions Cup – 4th place roster
| Players | | | | | | | Coaches |
| Pos | # | Nat | Name | Height | Weight | Age | Head Coach |
| PG | 1 | (Angola) | Francisco Sousa | 1.84 m (6 ft 1/2 in) | 83 kg (183 lb) | 30 May 1982 (aged 33) | (Spain) Ricard Casas |
| SF | 4 | (Angola) | Edson Ndoniema | 1.91 m (6 ft 3 in) | 90 kg (200 lb) | 11 February 1991 (aged 24) |
| PG | 5 | (Angola) | Armando Costa | 1.92 m (6 ft 3 1/2 in) | 91 kg (201 lb) | 3 June 1983 (aged 32) | Assistant coach(es) |
| C | 7 | (Angola) | Jone Pedro | 2.08 m (6 ft 10 in) | 95 kg (209 lb) | 28 June 1990 (aged 25) | (Angola) Aníbal Moreira |
| SF | 8 | (Angola) | Jorge Tati | 1.95 m (6 ft 5 in) | 107 kg (236 lb) | 17 June 1983 (aged 32) | (Angola) Miguel Lutonda |
| C | 9 | (Angola) | Felizardo Ambrósio | 2.02 m (6 ft 7 1/2 in) | 97 kg (214 lb) | 25 December 1987 (aged 27) |
| PF | 10 | (Angola) | Joaquim Gomes (C) | 2.00 m (6 ft 6 1/2 in) | 100 kg (220 lb) | 23 December 1980 (aged 34) |
| SG | 12 | (Rwanda) (United States) | Cedric Isom | 1.87 m (6 ft 1 1/2 in) | 88 kg (194 lb) | 4 June 1984 (aged 31) |
| PG | 16 | (Angola) | Hermenegildo Santos | 1.89 m (6 ft 2 1/2 in) | 84 kg (185 lb) | 16 August 1990 (aged 25) |
| SG | 17 | (Portugal) (Angola) | Edmir Lucas | 1.88 m (6 ft 2 in) | 88 kg (194 lb) | 15 July 1993 (aged 22) |
| SF | 19 | (Angola) | Mohamed Cissé | 1.98 m (6 ft 6 in) | 90 kg (200 lb) | 30 May 1982 (aged 33) |
| PF | 21 | (France) (United States) | Tariq Kirksay | 1.99 m (6 ft 6 1/2 in) | 90 kg (200 lb) | 7 September 1978 (aged 37) |

== (Angola) Recreativo do Libolo ==
Recreativo do Libolo – 2015 FIBA Africa Clubs Champions Cup – Silver medal roster
| Players | | | | | | | Coaches |
| Pos | # | Nat | Name | Height | Weight | Age | Head Coach |
| SF | 4 | (Angola) | Olímpio Cipriano | 1.94 m (6 ft 4 1/2 in) | 92 kg (203 lb) | 9 April 1982 (aged 33) | (Portugal) Norberto Alves |
| G | 5 | (United States) | Jonathan Wallace | 1.88 m (6 ft 2 in) | 86 kg (190 lb) | 16 May 1986 (aged 29) |
| SG | 6 | (Angola) | Carlos Morais | 1.92 m (6 ft 3 1/2 in) | 96 kg (212 lb) | 16 October 1985 (aged 30) | Assistant coach(es) |
| | 8 | (Angola) | Vladimir Pontes | 1.90 m (6 ft 3 in) | 83 kg (183 lb) | 9 November 1984 (aged 31) | (Angola) Emanuel Trovoada |
| PG | 9 | (Angola) | Bráulio Morais | 1.85 m (6 ft 1 in) | 90 kg (200 lb) | 17 December 1990 (aged 25) |
| PF | 10 | (United States) | Marcus Lewis | 2.03 m (6 ft 8 in) | 111 kg (245 lb) | 5 August 1986 (aged 29) |
| C | 12 | (Angola) | Valdelício Joaquim | 2.09 m (6 ft 10 1/2 in) | 108 kg (238 lb) | 15 April 1990 (aged 25) |
| PF | 13 | (Angola) | Zola Paulo | 2.02 m (6 ft 7 1/2 in) | 125 kg (276 lb) | 20 January 1988 (aged 27) |
| PF | 15 | (Angola) | Eduardo Mingas | 1.98 m (6 ft 6 in) | 106 kg (234 lb) | 29 January 1979 (aged 36) |
| | 16 | (Angola) | Joseney Joaquim | 2.00 m (6 ft 6 1/2 in) | 80 kg (180 lb) | 11 July 1992 (aged 23) |
| G | 17 | (Angola) | Benvindo Quimbamba | 1.98 m (6 ft 6 in) | 90 kg (200 lb) | 4 August 1993 (aged 22) |
| PG | 18 | (Angola) | Mílton Barros | 1.83 m (6 ft 0 in) | 75 kg (165 lb) | 21 June 1984 (aged 31) |

== See also ==
- 2015 FIBA Africa Championship squads
