= 2019 Africa Basketball League Final =

- Event: 2018–19 Africa Basketball League
AS Salé	Primeiro de Agosto
(Morocco)	(Angola)
71	83
Head coach: Željko Zečević	Head coach: Paulo Macedo
- Date: 26 May 2019
- Venue: Kilamba Arena, Luanda, Rwanda
- MVP: Eduardo Mingas
- Attendance: 5,500

The 2019 Africa Basketball League Final was the 33rd final of the FIBA Africa Basketball League, and the first under the new name. The game was played at 26 May 2019 at the Kilamba Arena in the Angolan capital of Luanda. It was also the last final of FIBA Africa's premier competition, before it was replaced by the Basketball Africa League.

Approximately 5,500 fans attended the game. Primeiro de Agosto won its record ninth African title. Primeiro's Eduardo Mingas was named MVP after the game.

== Venue ==
The Kilamba Arena in Luanda featured as the arena for the Final Four.

== Road to the finals ==
(Morocco) AS Salé			Round	(Angola) Primeiro de Agosto		
Opponent	Result		Group stage	Opponent	Result	
(Nigeria) Rivers Hoopers	88–59		Round 1	(Egypt) Al Ahly	86–77	
(Tunisia) JS Kairouan	77–70		Round 2	(Rwanda) REG	70–64	
(Guinea) SLAC	107–93		Round 3	(Mozambique) Ferroviário da Beira	87–55	
Opponent	Results		Playoffs	Opponent	Results	
(Nigeria) Civil Defenders	69–69	96–77	Quarterfinals	(Angola) Petro de Luanda	70–57	74–57
(Tunisia) JS Kairouan	81–73		Semifinals	(Egypt) Smouha	86–76	

== Game ==
26 May 2019	AS Salé (Morocco)	71–83	(Angola) Primeiro de Agosto	Luanda
18:30	Scoring by quarter: 17–26, 17–16, 19–13, 18–28
	Pts: Arnold 21; Rebs: Najah 13; Asts: El Mahsini 5 PIR: Najah 18	Report	Pts: Mingas; Rebs: Mingas 11; Asts: Quezada 7 PIR: Quezada 21	Arena: Kilamba Arena; Attendance: 5,500

Starters:			Pts	Reb	Ast
PG	5	(Morocco) Yassine El Mahsini	6	6	5
SG	9	(United States) Wayne Arnold	21	1	0
SF	11	(Morocco) Abdelhakim Zouita	15	3	2
PF	15	(Morocco) Abderrahim Najah	12	13	1
C	6	(Morocco) Soufiane Kourodu	6	6	1
Reserves:					
G	7	(Morocco) Zakaria El Masbahi	0	0	0
SF	10	(Morocco) Mohamed Choua	5	7	2
PG	32	(United States) Brandon Wood	6	4	1
SF	12	(Morocco) Mohammed Belhaddar	DNP		
C	14	(Morocco) Hamza Jaddi	DNP		
C	15	(Morocco) Adam El Ghazi	DNP		
F	17	(Morocco) Yacine Baeri	0	0	0
Head coach:
(Serbia) Zeljko Zecevic

Salé	Primeiro

Salé	Statistics	Primeiro
25/66 (38%)	2-pt field goals	30/75 (40%)
5/18 (28%)	3-pt field goals	14/34 (41%)
16/24 (67%)	Free throws	9/13 (69%)
17	Offensive rebounds	18
28	Defensive rebounds	29
45	Total rebounds	47
12	Assists	21
18	Turnovers	11
5	Steals	10
6	Blocks	3
14	Fouls	22

2019 FIBA Africa Basketball League champions

Primeiro de Agosto
9th title

Starters:			Pts	Reb	Ast
PG	16	(Angola) Hermenegildo Santos	10	1	8
SG	12	(Dominican Republic) Manny Quezada	17	6	7
F	3	(Angola) Malick Cisse	2	3	0
PF	15	(Angola) Eduardo Mingas	20	11	1
C	9	(Angola) Felizardo Ambrosio	9	8	0
Reserves:					
PG	1	(Angola) Pedro Bastos	DNP		
G	4	(Angola) Edson Ndoniema	2	3	0
PG	5	(Angola) Armando Costa	9	0	2
PG	10	(Angola) Carlos Cabral	DNP		
C	11	(Angola) Mutu Fonseca	0	1	2
SF	18	(Angola) Islando Manuel	12	7	2
PF	20	(United States) Andre Harris	0	1	1
Head coach:
(Angola) Paulo Macedo
