= 2015 FIBA Africa Clubs Champions Cup =

- Official tournament logo.
- Season: 2015
- Games played: 10–19 December
- Teams: 11

Regular season
- Season MVP: (Dominican Republic) Manny Quezada

Finals
- Champions: (Angola) Petro de Luanda; 2nd title
- Runners-up: (Angola) Rec do Libolo
- Third place: (Morocco) FAR Rabat
- Fourth place: (Angola) Primeiro de Agosto

The 2015 FIBA Africa Basketball Club Championship (30th edition), was an international basketball tournament held in Luanda, Angola from December 10 to 19, 2015. The tournament, organized by FIBA Africa and hosted by Clube Desportivo Primeiro de Agosto was contested by 11 clubs split into 2 groups of six and five, the top four of each group qualifying for the knock-out stage, quarter, semi-finals and final.

Petro de Luanda from Angola won their second title, after they defeated Recreativo do Libolo in the final in Luanda.

== Draw ==
Group A	Group B
(Cape Verde) AD Bairro (Morocco) FAR Rabat (Republic of the Congo) Inter Club (Angola) Petro de Luanda (Angola) Primeiro de Agosto	(Madagascar) ASCUT (Tunisia) ES Radès (Egypt) Al Gezira (Nigeria) Kano Pillars (Angola) Recreativo do Libolo

== Preliminary round ==
Times given below are in UTC+1.

=== Group A ===
Qualified for the quarter-finals

Pos.	Team	M	W	L	PF	PA	Diff	P
1.	(Angola) Primeiro de Agosto	4	4	0	263	190	+62	8
2.	(Morocco) FAR Rabat	4	3	1	251	243	+8	7
3.	(Angola) Petro de Luanda	4	2	2	304	255	+49	6
4.	(Cape Verde) AD Bairro	4	1	3	220	284	-64	5
5.	(Republic of the Congo) Inter Club	4	0	4	238	304	-66	4

10 December 2015
15:45

Boxscore

Inter Club (Republic of the Congo)	65–73	(Morocco) FAR Rabat
Scoring by quarter: 21-15, 11-28, 15-19, 18-11
Pts: Bopaka 21; Rebs: Kondzy 7 Asts: six players 1		Pts: Sow, Khalfi 12; Rebs: Benchlikha 6 Asts: four players 3

Multiusos do Kilamba, Luanda

10 December 2015
18:00

Boxscore

AD Bairro (Cape Verde)	43–67	(Angola) 1º de Agosto
Scoring by quarter: 15-13, 11-21, 10-17, 7-16
Pts: Mendonça 11; Rebs: Faty 4 Asts: Mendonça, Correia 3		Pts: Isom 14; Rebs: Miller 8 Asts: Isom 3

Multiusos do Kilamba, Luanda

11 December 2015
18:00

Boxscore

1º de Agosto (Angola)	54–41	(Morocco) FAR Rabat
Scoring by quarter: 17-7, 5-8, 15-14, 17-12
Pts: Kirksay, Isom 11; Rebs: Kirksay 9 Asts: Kirksay 3		Pts: Benchlikha 10; Rebs: Benchlikha, Moussaoui 4 Asts: Khalfi 2

Multiusos do Kilamba, Luanda

11 December 2015
20:15

Boxscore

AD Bairro (Cape Verde)	54–85	(Angola) Petro de Luanda
Scoring by quarter: 9-23, 9-22, 9-15, 27-25
Pts: Mendonça 28; Rebs: Faty, Gomes 6 Asts: three players 2		Pts: Leonel 17; Rebs: Cain 7 Asts: three players 3

Multiusos do Kilamba, Luanda

12 December 2015
13:30

Boxscore

AD Bairro (Cape Verde)	66–65	(Republic of the Congo) Inter Club
Scoring by quarter: 15-16, 18-15, 22-10, 11-24
Pts: Mendonça 23; Rebs: Mendonça 7 Asts: Mendonça 5		Pts: Wande 17; Rebs: Kondzy 7 Asts: Nguia, Mouesse 3

Multiusos do Kilamba, Luanda

12 December 2015
18:00

Boxscore

1º de Agosto (Angola)	74–55	(Angola) Petro de Luanda
Scoring by quarter: 14-20, 13-18, 24-12, 23-5
Pts: Jone 11; Rebs: Kirksay 9 Asts: Sousa 4		Pts: Quezada 18; Rebs: Cain 5 Asts: Cain 3

Multiusos do Kilamba, Luanda

14 December 2015
13:30

Boxscore

FAR Rabat (Morocco)	67–57	(Cape Verde) AD Bairro
Scoring by quarter: 20-14, 11-8, 13-26, 23-9
Pts: Foulani 17; Rebs: Khalfi, Laânani 7 Asts: Khalfi 4		Pts: Mendonça 25; Rebs: Faty 8 Asts: Freire 3

Multiusos do Kilamba, Luanda

14 December 2015
20:15

Boxscore

Petro Atlético (Angola)	97–57	(Republic of the Congo) Inter Club
Scoring by quarter: 25-20, 24-12, 24-14, 24-11
Pts: Quezada 24; Rebs: Leonel 11; Asts: Quezada 9		Pts: Nguia 17; Rebs: Mbongo 10; Asts: Nguia 3

Multiusos do Kilamba, Luanda

15 December 2015
18:00

Boxscore

1º de Agosto (Angola)	68–51	(Republic of the Congo) Inter Club
Scoring by quarter: 14-13, 19-11, 12-10, 23-17
Pts: Jone 14; Rebs: Kikas 9 Asts: Armando 5		Pts: Bopaka 17; Rebs: Kibozi 5 Asts: Nguia 2

Multiusos do Kilamba, Luanda

15 December 2015
20:15

Boxscore

Petro de Luanda (Angola)	67–70	(Morocco) FAR Rabat
Scoring by quarter: 18-8, 15-18, 9-18, 25-26
Pts: Quezada 17; Rebs: Moore 9 Asts: Gerson 4		Pts: Khalfi 20; Rebs: Bakala 8 Asts: Khalfi, Bakala 3

Multiusos do Kilamba, Luanda

=== Group B ===
Qualified for the quarter-finals

	Team	M	W	L	PF	PA	Diff	P
1.	(Angola) Recreativo do Libolo	4	4	0	355	264	+91	8
2.	(Tunisia) ES Radès	4	3	1	317	289	+28	7
3.	(Egypt) Al Gezira	4	2	2	307	271	+36	6
4.	(Nigeria) Kano Pillars	4	1	3	269	314	-45	5
5.	(Madagascar) ASCUT	4	0	4	245	355	-110	4

10 December 2015
13:30

Boxscore

ASCUT (Madagascar)	61–96	(Egypt) Al Gezira
Scoring by quarter: 13-25, 11-22, 15-27, 22-22
Pts: Botou 13; Rebs: Botou 5 Asts: Jean 3		Pts: Dorsey 16; Rebs: Ambres, Desouky 7 Asts: Dorsey, Sameh Ali 3

Multiusos do Kilamba, Luanda

20:15

Boxscore

Rec do Libolo (Angola)	83–81	(Tunisia) ES Radès
Scoring by quarter: 23-21, 17-16, 21-22, 22-22
Pts: C.Morais 20; Rebs: Vander 11; Asts: C.Morais 6		Pts: Maghrebi 21; Rebs: Lee 9 Asts: Abada, Smush 3

Multiusos do Kilamba, Luanda

11 December 2015
13:30

Boxscore

ASCUT (Madagascar)	70–82	(Tunisia) ES Radès
Scoring by quarter: 18-21, 18-20, 18-17, 16-24
Pts: Mitondrasoa 25; Rebs: Botou 11; Asts: Botou 4		Pts: Abbassi 28; Rebs: Smaali 9 Asts: Smush, Ilehi 4

Multiusos do Kilamba, Luanda

15:45

Boxscore

Al Gezira (Egypt)	83–58	(Nigeria) Kano Pillars
Scoring by quarter: 16-12, 10-14, 29-18, 28-14
Pts: Dorsey 20; Rebs: three players 6 Asts: four players 2		Pts: Yakubu 14; Rebs: Yakubu, Awere 6 Asts: Onmonya 2

Multiusos do Kilamba, Luanda

12 December 2015
15:45

Boxscore

Kano Pillars (Nigeria)	63–73	(Tunisia) ES Radès
Scoring by quarter: 9-16, 14-12, 29-25, 11-20
Pts: Onmonya 25; Rebs: Onmonya 9 Asts: Onmonya, Yakubu 3		Pts: Smush 13; Rebs: Smush 6 Asts: Smush, Maghrebi 4

Multiusos do Kilamba, Luanda

20:15

Boxscore

ASCUT (Madagascar)	59–98	(Angola) Rec do Libolo
Scoring by quarter: 15-26, 15-17, 10-31, 19-24
Pts: Kiady 13; Rebs: Jean 6 Asts: Romule 3		Pts: C.Morais 23; Rebs: Lewis, Mingas 6 Asts: three players 5

Multiusos do Kilamba, Luanda

14 December 2015
15:45

Boxscore

ES Radès (Tunisia)	81–73	(Egypt) Al Gezira
Scoring by quarter: 12-26, 23-10, 24-22, 22-15
Pts: Smush 15; Rebs: Lee 7 Asts: Smush 4		Pts: Dorsey 24; Rebs: El Ghannam 9 Asts: Dorsey 6

Multiusos do Kilamba, Luanda

18:00

Boxscore

Kano Pillars (Nigeria)	69–103	(Angola) Rec do Libolo
Scoring by quarter: 14-29, 12-20, 26-21, 17-33
Pts: Awere 16; Rebs: Awere, Ademola 5 Asts: Yusuf 5		Pts: Olímpio 21; Rebs: three players 5 Asts: three players 5

Multiusos do Kilamba, Luanda

15 December 2015
13:30

Boxscore

Kano Pillars (Nigeria)	79–55	(Madagascar) ASCUT
Scoring by quarter: 15-11, 14-9, 22-17, 28-18
Pts: Yakubu 13; Rebs: Awere, Yusuf 7 Asts: Yusuf 7		Pts: Romule 24; Rebs: Botou 9 Asts: Romule 3

Multiusos do Kilamba, Luanda

15:45

Boxscore

Rec do Libolo (Angola)	71–55	(Egypt) Al Gezira
Scoring by quarter: 16-11, 9-17, 21-17, 25-10
Pts: Lewis 16; Rebs: Mingas 15; Asts: Olímpio 5		Pts: Ambres 14; Rebs: Ambres 6 Asts: Gendy 3

Multiusos do Kilamba, Luanda

== Knockout round ==
=== Championship bracket ===
Quarter-finals
16 December
(Angola) Petro de Luanda	74
(Tunisia) ES Radès	49
16 December
(Angola) 1º de Agosto	102
(Nigeria) Kano Pillars	60
16 December
(Angola) Rec do Libolo	93
(Cape Verde) AD Bairro	61
16 December
(Morocco) FAR Rabat	60
(Egypt) Al Gezira	47

Semi-finals
18 December
(Angola) Petro de Luanda	74
(Angola) 1º de Agosto	63
18 December
(Angola) Rec do Libolo	85
(Morocco) FAR Rabat	55

Final
19 December
(Angola) Petro de Luanda	89
(Angola) Rec do Libolo	75
3rd place
19 December
(Morocco) FAR Rabat	72
(Angola) 1º de Agosto	62

=== 5-8th bracket ===
5–8th place
17 December
(Tunisia) ES Radès	64
(Nigeria) Kano Pillars	59
17 December
(Egypt) Al Gezira	76
(Cape Verde) AD Bairro	63

Fifth place
18 December
(Tunisia) ES Radès	78
(Egypt) Al Gezira	73
Seventh place
18 December
(Nigeria) Kano Pillars	77
(Cape Verde) AD Bairro	75

=== 9th place ===
16 December 2015
11:15

Boxscore

Inter Club (Republic of the Congo)	67–43	(Madagascar) ASCUT
Scoring by quarter: 16-12, 23-11, 13-13, 15-7
Pts: Yoa 15; Rebs: Yoa 10; Asts: Wande 5		Pts: Romule 11; Rebs: Fataka 5 Asts: three players 2

Multiusos do Kilamba, Luanda

=== Quarter finals ===
16 December 2015
13:30

Boxscore

AD Bairro (Cape Verde)	61–93	(Angola) Rec do Libolo
Scoring by quarter: 15-24, 14-21, 24-29, 8-19
Pts: Mendonça 23; Rebs: Mendonça 11; Asts: Mendonça 3		Pts: Vander 19; Rebs: Vander 7 Asts: four players 2

Multiusos do Kilamba, Luanda

15:45

Boxscore

Al Gezira (Egypt)	47–60	(Morocco) Far Rabat
Scoring by quarter: 15-18, 10-15, 14-14, 8-13
Pts: Gendy 16; Rebs: El Ghannam 8 Asts: Gendy 3		Pts: Khalfi 14; Rebs: Laânani 8 Asts: Bakala 3

Multiusos do Kilamba, Luanda

18:00

Boxscore

Kano Pillars (Nigeria)	60–102	(Angola) 1º de Agosto
Scoring by quarter: 12-26, 16-28, 22-26, 10-22
Pts: Yusuf 16; Rebs: Yusuf 4 Asts: Ojo 4		Pts: Kikas 17; Rebs: Kirksay 8 Asts: Armando 7

Multiusos do Kilamba, Luanda

20:15

Boxscore

Petro Atlético (Angola)	74–49	(Tunisia) ES Radès
Scoring by quarter: 23-17, 18-12, 16-7, 17-13
Pts: Quezada 36; Rebs: Moore 9 Asts: Quezada 4		Pts: Smush 15; Rebs: Smush, Lee 6 Asts: Smush 3

Multiusos do Kilamba, Luanda

=== 5th-8th place ===
17 December 2015
14:00

Boxscore

AD Bairro (Cape Verde)	63–76	(Egypt) Al Gezira
Scoring by quarter: 25-12, 12-19, 11-25, 15-20
Pts: Mendonça 26; Rebs: Faty 10; Asts: Freire 7		Pts: Gendy 24; Rebs: Gendy 7 Asts: Dorsey 3

Multiusos do Kilamba, Luanda

16:15

Boxscore

Kano Pillars (Nigeria)	59–64	(Tunisia) ES Radès
Scoring by quarter: 22-21, 13-21, 11-15, 13-7
Pts: Yusuf 14; Rebs: Omaga 10; Asts: Dung 3		Pts: Abbassi 15; Rebs: Rzig 7 Asts: Smush 8

Multiusos do Kilamba, Luanda

=== 7th place ===
18 December 2015
13:30

Boxscore

Kano Pillars (Nigeria)	77–75	(Cape Verde) AD Bairro
Scoring by quarter: 20-11, 24-6, 14-23, 19-35
Pts: Yusuf 20; Rebs: Ademola 8 Asts: Yusuf, Omaga 3		Pts: Mendonça 24; Rebs: Rocha 7 Asts: Mendonça 5

Multiusos do Kilamba, Luanda

=== 5th place ===
18 December 2015
15:45

Boxscore

ES Radès (Tunisia)	78–73	(Egypt) Al Gezira
Scoring by quarter: 21-25, 14-14, 21-14, 22-20
Pts: Abbassi 26; Rebs: Lee 9 Asts: Abada 4		Pts: Ambres 19; Rebs: Gendy 8 Asts: Gendy 3

Multiusos do Kilamba, Luanda

=== Semifinals ===
18 December 2015
18:00

Boxscore

Rec do Libolo (Angola)	85–55	(Morocco) Far Rabat
Scoring by quarter: 23-11, 21-14, 18-18, 23-12
Pts: Vander 19; Rebs: Vander 9 Asts: C.Morais 8		Pts: Sow 14; Rebs: Laânani 7 Asts: Laânani 4

Multiusos do Kilamba, Luanda

20:15

Boxscore

1º de Agosto (Angola)	63–74	(Angola) Petro Atlético
Scoring by quarter: 11-17, 18-16, 26-11, 8-30
Pts: Miller 12; Rebs: Miller 9 Asts: Armando 7		Pts: Leonel 21; Rebs: Leonel 9 Asts: Leonel 3

Multiusos do Kilamba, Luanda

=== Bronze-medal game ===
19 December 2015
17:30

Boxscore

1º de Agosto (Angola)	62–72	(Morocco) Far Rabat
Scoring by quarter: 17-21, 20-15, 9-19, 16-17
Pts: Ndoniema 15; Rebs: Kirksay, Armando 7 Asts: Armando 8		Pts: Bakala 17; Rebs: Bakala 8 Asts: Khalfi 4

Multiusos do Kilamba, Luanda

=== Gold-medal game ===
19 December 2015
20:00

Boxscore

Petro Atlético (Angola)	89–75	(Angola) Rec do Libolo
Scoring by quarter: 26-24, 23-13, 18-26, 26-12
Pts: Quezada 32; Rebs: Quezada 7 Asts: Quezada 7		Pts: Olímpio 19; Rebs: Olímpio, Vander 6 Asts: C.Morais 6

Multiusos do Kilamba, Luanda

== Final standings ==
Rank	Team	Record
Gold medal	(Angola) Petro Atlético	5–2
Silver medal	(Angola) Recreativo do Libolo	6–1
Bronze medal	(Morocco) Far Rabat	5–2
4	(Angola) Primeiro de Agosto	5–2
5	(Tunisia) ES Radès	5–2
6	(Egypt) Al Gezira	3–4
7	(Nigeria) Kano Pillars	2–5
8	(Cape Verde) AD Bairro	1–6
9	(Republic of the Congo) Inter Club	1–4
10	(Madagascar) ASCUT	0–5

Petro Atlético roster
Délcio Ucuahamba, Domingos Bonifácio, Gerson Gonçalves, Hermenegildo Mbunga, Jason Cain, Joaquim Pedro, Leonel Paulo, Manny Quezada, Paulo Santana, Pedro Bastos, Reggie Moore, Teotónio Dó, Coach: Lazare Andingono

== Statistical leaders ==
=== Individual Tournament Highs ===
Points

Rank	Name	G	Pts	PPG
1	(Cape Verde) Fidel Mendonça	7	160	22.9
2	(Dominican Republic) Manny Quezada	7	153	21.9
3	(Egypt) Amr Gendy	7	112	16
4	(Angola) Carlos Morais	7	110	15.7
5	(Tunisia) Mohamed Abbassi	7	109	15.6
6	(United States) Daryl Dorsey	7	108	15.4
7	(Angola) Olímpio Cipriano	7	100	14.3
8	(United States) William Parker	6	93	13.3
9	(Madagascar) Romule Razafimahasahy	5	65	13
10	(Angola) Leonel Paulo	7	87	12.4

Rebounds

Rank	Name	G	Rbs	RPG
1	(Angola) Valdelício Joaquim	7	50	7.1
1	(France) Tariq Kirksay	7	50	7.1
3	(United States) Jason Cain	7	47	6.7
4	(United States) Christopher Lee	6	40	6.7
5	(Madagascar) Vallery Botou	5	32	6.4
6	(Angola) Leonel Paulo	7	44	6.3
7	(Egypt) Tarek El Ghannam	6	38	6.3
8	(Angola) Eduardo Mingas	7	42	6
9	(Morocco) Omar Laânani	7	40	5.7
10	(Comoros) Ahmed Ibrahim	5	27	5.4

Assists

Rank	Name	G	Ast	APG
1	(Angola) Armando Costa	7	31	4.4
2	(United States) William Parker	7	29	4.1
3	(Angola) Carlos Morais	7	28	4
4	(Dominican Republic) Manny Quezada	7	27	3.9
5	(Cape Verde) Fidel Mendonça	7	22	3.1
6	(Cape Verde) Braima Freire	7	21	3
7	(Morocco) Mustapha Khalfi	7	19	2.7
7	(United States) Jonathan Wallace	7	19	2.7
9	(United States) Daryl Dorsey	7	18	2.6
9	(United States) Cedric Isom	7	18	2.6

Steals

Rank	Name	G	Sts	SPG
1	(Republic of the Congo) Hervé Wande	5	20	4
2	(Cape Verde) Fidel Mendonça	7	21	3
3	(Morocco) Mustapha Khalfi	7	19	2.7
4	(Angola) Olímpio Cipriano	7	18	2.6
5	(United States) Jason Cain	7	17	2.4
6	(Cape Verde) Mário Correia	4	9	2.3
7	(Cape Verde) Braima Freire	7	15	2.1
8	(Angola) Francisco Sousa	7	13	1.9
8	(Dominican Republic) Manny Quezada	7	13	1.9
8	(Nigeria) Ibrahim Yusuf	7	13	1.9

Blocks

Rank	Name	G	Bks	BPG
1	(Angola) Leonel Paulo	7	12	1.7
2	(Angola) Teotónio Dó	6	8	1.3
3	(Cape Verde) Abdulay Faty	7	7	1
4	(Comoros) Ahmed Ibrahim	5	5	1
5	(Nigeria) Cyril Awere	7	6	0.9
6	(Egypt) Salaheldin Mohammed	7	5	0.7
7	(Egypt) Tarek El Ghannam	6	4	0.7
8	(Morocco) Omar Laânani	7	4	0.6
8	(Angola) Jone Pedro	7	4	0.6
10	(United States) Christopher Lee	6	3	0.5

Turnovers

Rank	Name	G	Tos	TPG
1	(Nigeria) Ibrahim Yusuf	7	40	5.7
2	(Dominican Republic) Manny Quezada	7	32	4.6
3	(Cape Verde) Fidel Mendonça	7	27	3.9
3	(Cape Verde) Braima Freire	7	27	3.9
5	(Republic of the Congo) Hervé Wande	5	19	3.8
5	(Republic of the Congo) Japhie Nguia	5	19	3.8
7	(Cape Verde) Admir Mendes	7	26	3.7
8	(Angola) Armando Costa	7	25	3.6
9	(Morocco) Mustapha Khalfi	7	24	3.4
10	(Madagascar) Lalason Ratsimbazafy	5	17	3.4

2-point field goal percentage

Pos	Name	A	M	%
1	(Egypt) Amr Gendy	49	32	65.3
2	(Tunisia) Mohamed Abbassi	55	32	58.2
2	(Cape Verde) Fidel Mendonça	55	32	58.2
4	(Dominican Republic) Manny Quezada	44	23	52.3
5	(Republic of the Congo) Benjeny Yoa	33	17	51.5
6	(United States) Cedric Isom	43	22	51.2
7	(Republic of the Congo) Hervé Wande	31	15	48.4
8	(United States) Mildon Ambres	48	23	47.9
9	(United States) Daryl Dorsey	44	20	45.5
10	(Madagascar) Romule Razafimahasahy	30	13	43.3

3-point field goal percentage

Pos	Name	A	M	%
1	(Angola) Domingos Bonifácio	26	12	46.2
2	(Madagascar) Mbolaniaina Ramamonjisoa	11	5	45.5
3	(Angola) Bráulio Morais	18	8	44.4
4	(Egypt) Tamer Shanin	9	4	44.4
5	(Tunisia) Marouan Kechrid	16	7	43.8
6	(Egypt) Tarek El Ghannam	12	5	41.7
7	(Morocco) Mustapha Khalfi	34	14	41.2
8	(Cape Verde) Fidel Mendonça	66	27	40.9
9	(Republic of the Congo) Japhie Nguia	10	4	40
10	(Dominican Republic) Manny Quezada	54	21	38.9

Free throw percentage

Pos	Name	A	M	%
1	(Dominican Republic) Manny Quezada	55	44	80
2	(Angola) Reggie Moore	38	29	76.3
3	(Republic of the Congo) Hervé Wande	34	25	73.5
4	(Tunisia) Mohamed Abbassi	41	30	73.2
5	(Cape Verde) Fidel Mendonça	21	15	71.4
6	(United States) Daryl Dorsey	42	29	69
7	(Angola) Carlos Morais	29	20	69
8	(Republic of the Congo) Japhie Nguia	16	11	68.8
9	(Tunisia) Amine Rzig	20	13	65
10	(United States) Jason Cain	38	24	63.2

=== Individual Game Highs ===
Department	Name	Total	Opponent
Points	(Dominican Republic) Manny Quezada	36	(Tunisia) ES Radès
Rebounds	(Angola) Eduardo Mingas	15	(Egypt) Al Gezira
Assists	(Dominican Republic) Manny Quezada	9	(Republic of the Congo) Inter Club
Steals	(Angola) Olímpio Cipriano	8	(Cape Verde) AD Bairro
Blocks	(Angola) Leonel Paulo	5	(Nigeria) ES Radès
2-point field goal percentage	(Angola) Olímpio Cipriano (Angola) Reggie Moore	100% (6/6)	(Cape Verde) AD Bairro (Angola) Rec do Libolo
3-point field goal percentage	four players	100% (3/3)	
Free throw percentage	(Angola) Reggie Moore	100% (6/6)	(Cape Verde) AD Bairro
Turnovers	three players	8	

=== Team Tournament Highs ===
Points

Rank	Name	G	Pts	PPG
1	(Angola) Recreativo do Libolo	7	608	86.9
2	(Angola) Petro Atlético	7	541	77.3
3	(Tunisia) ES Radès	7	508	72.6
4	(Egypt) Al Gezira	7	503	71.9
5	(Angola) 1º de Agosto	7	490	70
6	(Nigeria) Kano Pillars	7	465	66.4
7	(Morocco) Far Rabat	7	438	62.6
8	(Republic of the Congo) Inter Club	5	305	61
9	(Cape Verde) AD Bairro	7	419	59.9
10	(Madagascar) ASCUT	5	288	57.6

Rebounds

Rank	Name	G	Rbs	RPG
1	(Angola) Recreativo do Libolo	7	259	36.7
2	(Angola) 1º de Agosto	7	300	36.1
3	(Egypt) Al Gezira	7	160	35.3
4	(Nigeria) Kano Pillars	7	230	34.4
5	(Angola) Petro Atlético	7	287	34.3
6	(Morocco) Far Rabat	7	286	32.4
7	(Madagascar) ASCUT	5	284	32.2
8	(Tunisia) ES Radès	7	207	32
9	(Republic of the Congo) Inter Club	5	274	30
10	(Cape Verde) AD Bairro	7	203	27.3

Assists

Rank	Name	G	Ast	APG
1	(Angola) Recreativo do Libolo	7	124	17.7
2	(Angola) 1º de Agosto	7	115	16.4
3	(Tunisia) ES Radès	7	103	14.7
4	(Angola) Petro Atlético	7	95	13.6
5	(Nigeria) Kano Pillars	7	84	12
6	(Madagascar) ASCUT	5	57	11.4
7	(Morocco) Far Rabat	7	78	11.1
8	(Cape Verde) AD Bairro	7	76	10.9
9	(Egypt) Al Gezira	7	69	9.9
10	(Republic of the Congo) Inter Club	5	38	7.6

Steals

Rank	Name	G	Sts	SPG
1	(Republic of the Congo) Inter Club	5	66	13.2
2	(Cape Verde) AD Bairro	7	84	12
3	(Nigeria) Kano Pillars	7	80	11.4
4	(Tunisia) ES Radès	7	79	11.3
5	(Angola) Petro Atlético	7	78	11.1
6	(Angola) Rec do Libolo	7	76	10.9
6	(Morocco) Far Rabat	7	76	10.9
8	(Madagascar) ASCUT	5	53	10.6
9	(Egypt) Al Gezira	7	73	10.4
10	(Angola) 1º de Agosto	7	63	9

Blocks

Rank	Name	G	Bks	BPG
1	(Angola) Petro Atlético	7	23	3.3
2	(Egypt) Al Gezira	7	19	2.7
3	(Nigeria) Kano Pillars	7	14	2
4	(Angola) ASCUT	5	10	2
5	(Cape Verde) AD Bairro	7	13	1.9
6	(Angola) 1º de Agosto	7	11	1.6
7	(Angola) Recreativo do Libolo	7	10	1.4
7	(Morocco) Far Rabat	7	10	1.4
9	(Tunisia) ES Radès	7	7	1
10	(Republic of the Congo) Inter Club	5	1	0.2

Turnovers

Rank	Name	G	Tos	TPG
1	(Madagascar) ASCUT	5	120	24
2	(Cape Verde) AD Bairro	7	161	23
3	(Nigeria) Kano Pillars	7	151	21.6
4	(Republic of the Congo) Inter Club	5	103	20.6
5	(Angola) Petro Atlético	7	132	18.9
6	(Morocco) Far Rabat	7	126	18
7	(Angola) Rec do Libolo	7	120	17.1
8	(Angola) 1º de Agosto	7	118	16.9
9	(Egypt) Al Gezira	7	117	16.7
10	(Tunisia) ES Radès	7	114	16.3

2-point field goal percentage

Pos	Name	A	M	%
1	(Angola) 1º de Agosto	209	132	63.2
2	(Angola) Recreativo do Libolo	230	141	61.3
3	(Angola) Petro Atlético	194	116	59.8
4	(Tunisia) ES Radès	241	133	55.2
5	(Nigeria) Kano Pillars	209	111	53.1
6	(Cape Verde) AD Bairro	207	105	50.7
7	(Republic of the Congo) Inter Club	178	90	50.6
8	(Morocco) Far Rabat	236	115	48.7
9	(Egypt) Al Gezira	265	128	48.3
10	(Madagascar) ASCUT	184	78	42.4

3-point field goal percentage

Pos	Name	A	M	%
1	(Angola) Recreativo do Libolo	202	74	36.6
2	(Angola) Petro Atlético	171	56	32.7
3	(Egypt) Al Gezira	161	51	31.7
4	(Cape Verde) AD Bairro	198	59	29.8
5	(Madagascar) ASCUT	119	35	29.4
5	(Morocco) Far Rabat	119	35	29.4
7	(Tunisia) ES Radès	141	40	28.4
8	(Nigeria) Kano Pillars	180	51	28.3
9	(Angola) 1º de Agosto	186	48	25.8
10	(Republic of the Congo) Inter Club	87	17	19.5

Free throw percentage

Pos	Name	A	M	%
1	(Republic of the Congo) Inter Club	105	74	70.5
2	(Angola) Recreativo do Libolo	156	104	66.7
3	(Angola) Petro Atlético	213	141	66.2
4	(Tunisia) ES Radès	187	122	65.2
5	(Angola) 1º de Agosto	134	82	61.2
6	(Egypt) Al Gezira	164	94	57.3
7	(Madagascar) ASCUT	48	27	56.2
8	(Nigeria) Kano Pillars	167	90	53.9
9	(Morocco) Far Rabat	194	103	53.1
10	(Cape Verde) AD Bairro	62	32	51.6

=== Team Game highs ===
Department	Name	Total	Opponent
Points	(Angola) Rec do Libolo	103	(Nigeria) Kano Pillars
Rebounds	(Angola) Rec do Libolo	49	(Egypt) Al Gezira
Assists	(Angola) 1º de Agosto	29	(Nigeria) Kano Pillars
Steals	(Nigeria) Kano Pillars	25	(Madagascar) ASCUT
Blocks	(Angola) Petro Atlético	7	(Tunisia) ES Radès
2-point field goal percentage	(Angola) Petro Atlético	76.5% (26/34)	(Republic of the Congo) Inter Club
3-point field goal percentage	(Morocco) Far Rabat	57.1% (8/14)	(Republic of the Congo) Inter Club
Free throw percentage	(Cape Verde) AD Bairro	100% (2/2)	(Morocco) Far Rabat
Turnovers	(Cape Verde) AD Bairro	29	(Angola) Petro Atlético

== All Tournament Team ==
G	(Dominican Republic)	Manny Quezada
G	(Angola)	Carlos Morais
F	(Angola)	Leonel Paulo
F	(Cape Verde)	Fidel Mendonça
C	(Morocco)	Omar Laânani

2015 FIBA Africa Clubs Champions Cup

Petro de Luanda
2nd title

Most Valuable Player
(Dominican Republic) Manny Quezada

== See also ==
- 2015 AfroBasket
