= Africa Basketball League All-Star Team =

The FIBA Africa Basketball League All-Star Team was a selection of the five best players in the now defunct FIBA Africa Basketball League (ABL) season. Formerly the league was named the FIBA Africa Clubs Champions Cup (ACC).

Eduardo Mingas holds the record for most selections, with five.

== Selections ==
^	Denotes players who are still active in the BAL
*	Elected to the Naismith Memorial Basketball Hall of Fame
Player (X)	Denotes the number of times the player has been selected
**Player** **(in bold text)**	Indicates the player who won the Most Valuable Player in the same year

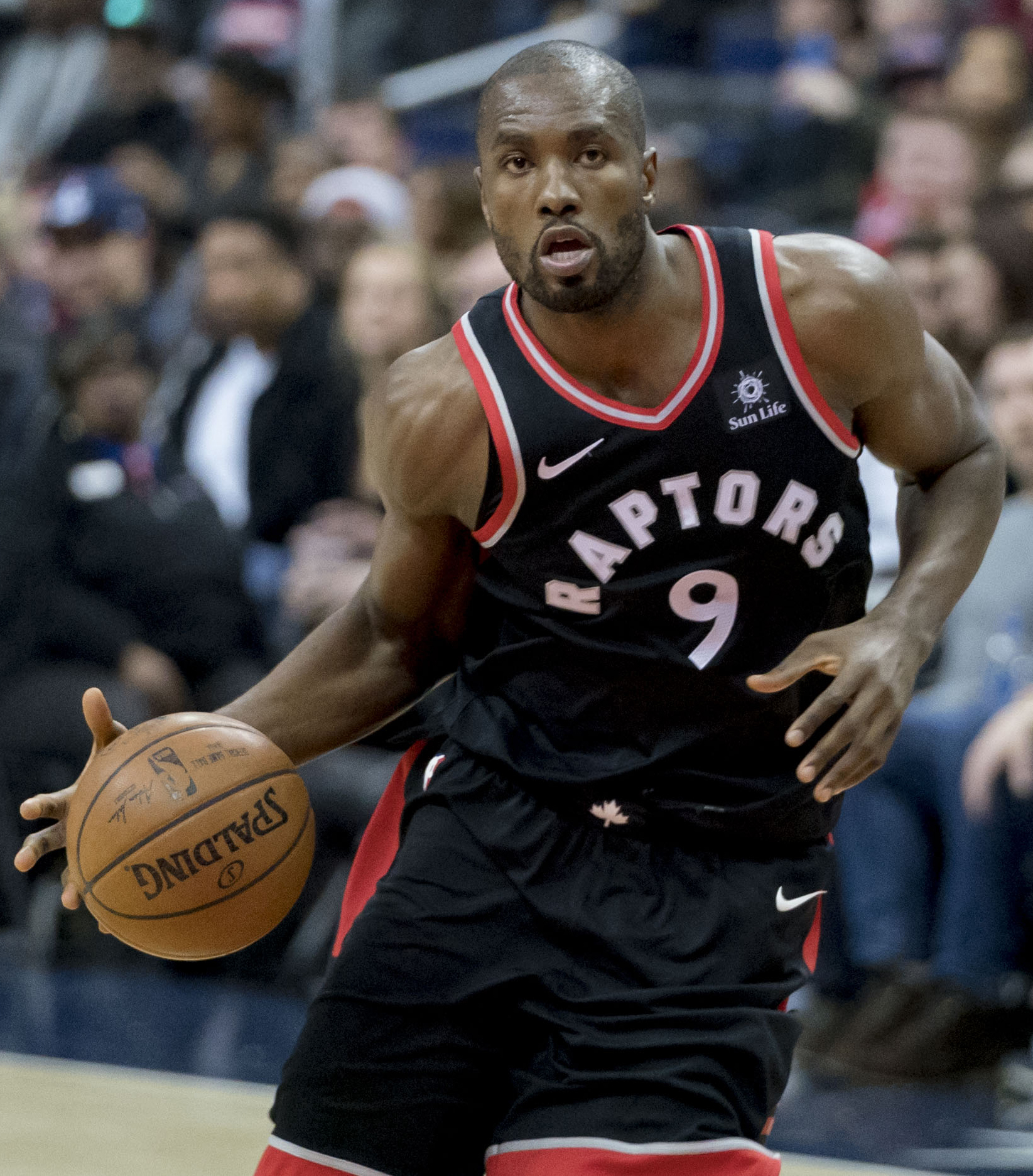
Serge Ibaka, at age 17, was named to the 2006 team

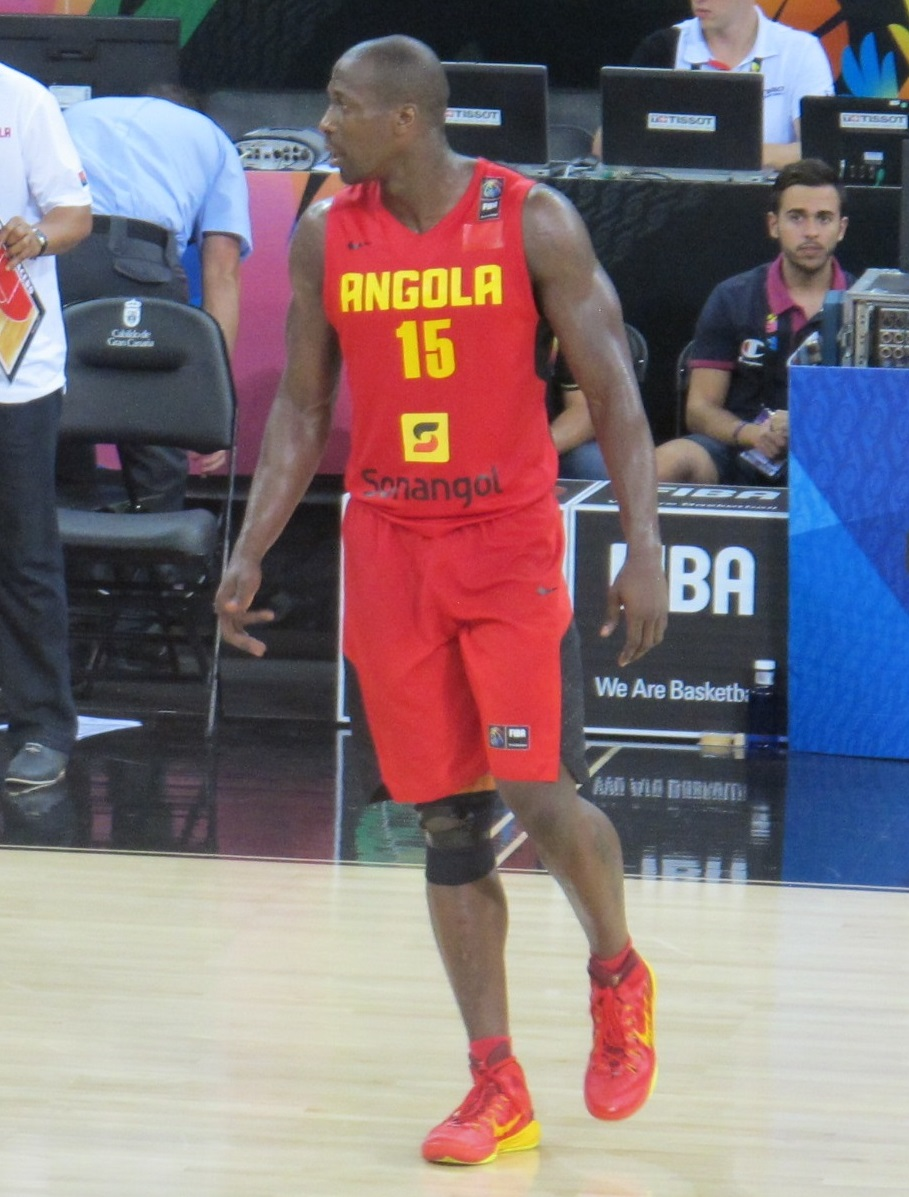
Eduardo Mingas has been selected a record 5 times for the All-Star Team

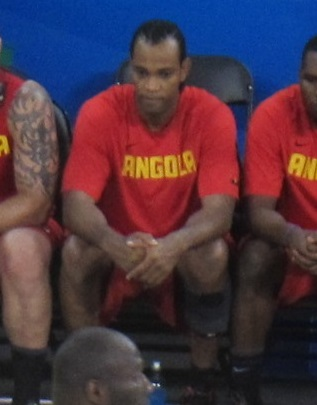
Kikas Gomes has been named to three all-star teams

Season	Position	Player	Team	Ref.
2006	G	(Angola) **Milton Barros**	(Angola) Petro de Luanda	
2006	G	(Angola) Armando Costa	(Angola) Primeiro de Agosto	
2006	F	(Nigeria) Bukar Muhammed	(Nigeria) Dodan Warriors	
2006	F	(Nigeria) Stanley Gumut	(Nigeria) Plateau Peaks	
2006	C	(Republic of the Congo) Serge Ibaka	(Republic of the Congo) Inter Club	
2007	G	(United States) Shannon Crooks	(Angola) Petro de Luanda	
2007	G	(Angola) **Olímpio Cipriano**	(Angola) Primeiro de Agosto	
2007	F	(Ivory Coast) Stephané Konaté	(Ivory Coast) ABC	
2007	F	(Angola) Eduardo Mingas	(Angola) Petro de Luanda	
2007	C	(Angola) Kikas Gomes	(Angola) Primeiro de Agosto	
2008	G	(Tunisia) Omar Mouhli	(Tunisia) ES Sahel	
2008	G	(Libya) Mohamed Mrsal	(Libya) Al Shabab	
2008	F	(Tunisia) Atef Maoua		
2008	F	(Nigeria) Dennis Ebikoro	(Nigeria) Kano Pillars	
2008	C	(Angola) Kikas Gomes (2)	(Angola) Primeiro de Agosto	
2009	G	(Rwanda) Cedric Isom	(Rwanda) APR	
2009	G	(United States) Curtis Terry	(Angola) Petro de Luanda	
2009	F	(Angola) **Vladimir Gerónimo**	(Angola) Primeiro de Agosto	
2009	F	(Cape Verde) Rodrigo Mascarenhas	(Angola) Primeiro de Agosto	
2009	C	(Angola) Eduardo Mingas (2)	(Angola) Petro de Luanda	
2010	G	(Nigeria) Aboubakar Usman	(Nigeria) Kano Pillars	
2010	G	(Cameroon) Christian Bayang	(Cameroon) Condor	
2010	F	(Angola) Felizardo Ambrósio (2)	(Angola) Primeiro de Agosto	
2010	F	(United States) Cameron Echols	(Mozambique) Maxaquene	
2010	F	(Angola) Kikas Gomes (3)	(Angola) Primeiro de Agosto	
2011	G	(Angola) Carlos Morais	(Angola) Petro de Luanda	
2011	G	(Cameroon) Christian Bayang (2)	(Morocco) Chabab Rif Al Hoceima	
2011	F	(United States) Willie Kemp	(Tunisia) ES Sahel	
2011	F	(Tunisia) **Makrem Ben Romdhane**	(Tunisia) ES Sahel	
2011	F	(Cape Verde) Mário Correia	(Angola) Primeiro de Agosto	
2012	G	(Angola) Armando Costa (2)	(Angola) Primeiro de Agosto	
2012	G	(Angola) **Carlos Morais** (2)	(Angola) Primeiro de Agosto	
2012	F	(Angola) Olímpio Cipriano (2)	(Angola) Rec do Libolo	
2012	F	(United States) Torrington Cox	(Egypt) Al Ittihad	
2012	C	(Egypt) Tarek El-Ghannam	(Egypt) Al Ahly	
2013	G	(Rwanda) **Cedric Isom** (2)	(Angola) Primeiro de Agosto	
2013	F	(Tunisia) Hamdi Braa	(Tunisia) ES Sahel	
2013	F	(Angola) Eduardo Mingas (3)	(Angola) Rec do Libolo	
2013	F	(Angola) Kikas Gomes (4)	(Angola) Primeiro de Agosto	
2013	C	(United States) Kevin Bridgewater	(Tunisia) ES Sahel	
2014	G	(Angola) Mílton Barros	(Angola) Benfica do Libolo	
2014	F	(Angola) **Eduardo Mingas** (4)	(Angola) Benfica do Libolo	
2014	F	(Tunisia) Makrem Ben Romdhane (2)	(Egypt) Sporting Alexandria	
2014	F	(United States) Averon Mathews	(Tunisia) ES Radès	
2014	C	(United States) Marcus Haislip	(Tunisia) Club Africain	
2015	G	(Dominican Republic) **Manny Quezada**	(Angola) Petro de Luanda	
2015	G	(Angola) Carlos Morais	(Angola) Petro de Luanda	
2015	F	(Angola) Leonel Paulo	(Angola) Petro de Luanda	
2015	F	(Cape Verde) Fidel Mendonça	(Cape Verde) AD Bairro	
2015	C	(Morocco) Omar Laânani		
2016	G	(United States) **Wayne Arnold**	(Egypt) Al Ahly	
2016	G	(United States) Je'Kel Foster	(Angola) Benfica do Libolo	
2016	F	(Morocco) Abdelhakim Zouita	(Morocco) AS Salé	
2016	F	(Egypt) Tarek El-Ghannam (2)	(Egypt) Al Ahly	
2016	C	(Angola) Valdelício Joaquim	(Angola) Petro de Luanda	
2017	G	(Tunisia) Omar Abada	(Tunisia) Étoile de Radès	
2017	F	(Morocco) **Abdelhakim Zouita**	(Morocco) AS Salé	
2017	F	(Morocco) Abderrahim Najah	(Morocco) AS Salé	
2017	F	(Algeria) Mohamed Harat	(Algeria) GS Pétroliers	
2017	C	(Democratic Republic of the Congo) Evariste Shonganya	(Tunisia) US Monastir	
2018–19	G	(Dominican Republic) Manny Quezada (2)	(Angola) Primeiro de Agosto	
2018–19	G	(United States) James Justice Jr.	(Egypt) Smouha	
2018–19	F	(Angola) **Eduardo Mingas** (5)	(Angola) Primeiro de Agosto	
2018–19	F	(Morocco) Abderrahim Najah (2)	(Morocco) AS Salé	
2018–19	C	(Morocco) Soufiane Kourdou	(Morocco) AS Salé	

== Selections by player ==
Selections	Player
5	Eduardo Mingas
4	Kikas Gomes
2	Makrem Ben Romdhane
2	Manny Quezada
2	Abderrahim Najah
2	Tarek El-Ghannam
2	Christian Bayang
2	Cedric Isom
2	Armando Costa
2	Olímpio Cipriano
2	Felizardo Ambrósio
