= 2019 FIBA Africa Basketball League =

Africa Basketball League
- Season: 2019
- Dates: February 8 – May 26, 2019
- Games played: 24 (group stage); 12 (knockout phase)
- Teams: 42 (qualifying tournament); 16 (group stage)

Regular season
- Season MVP: Eduardo Mingas (Primeiro de Agosto)

Finals
- Champions: (Angola) Primeiro de Agosto (9th title)
- Runners-up: (Morocco) AS Salé
- Third place: (Egypt) Smouha SC
- Fourth place: (Tunisia) JS Kairouan

Statistical leaders
Points	Reggie Holmes (Al Ahly)	20.2
Rebounds	Todd O'Brien (Al Ahly)	12.0
Assists	Ahmed Dhif (Kairouan)	5.7
Efficiency	Maodo Nguirane (Kairouan)	21.7

The 2019 FIBA Africa Basketball League was the 33rd edition of FIBA Africa's premier club Basketball tournament and the 1st under the new format and new name. The season saw an expansion from twelve to sixteen teams.

The season began on February 8, 2019, and ended on May 26, 2019, with the conclusion of the Final Four. The Final Four was hosted at the Kilamba Arena in Luanda, Angola.

It was the last season of the league as the competition was replaced by the Basketball Africa League (BAL), a new competition jointly established by the National Basketball Association (NBA) and FIBA.

== Competition format ==
FIBA Africa has increased the number of participating teams from twelve to sixteen. These teams get their ticket for the Africa Basketball League through regional qualifiers (Zone 1, 2, 3, 4, 5, 6 and 7 of FIBA Africa).

The qualifiers for the Africa Basketball League Group stage was held from September and until mid-December 2018, while the final phase will take place from January 11 to April 21, 2019, in various African cities.

The 16 teams qualified for the round of 16 will be divided into 4 groups of 4 teams each and the competition will take place in the form of a championship where each team will face respectively the 3 opponents of his group. Then, the first two clubs in each group will qualify for the Elite 8 where the clubs will be divided into four groups of two teams each and then games will be played in a home and away format. At this stage, the competition will be played in a one-way match against the principle of direct elimination. The Four winners will advance to the Final 4, that will be played on April 20 while the final take place the next day.

== Qualification tournament ==
Zone	Qualified teams	Eliminated teams
Zone 1	(Tunisia) ES Radès; (Morocco) AS Salé; (Tunisia) JS Kairouan	(Morocco) Wydad AC; (Libya) Al Ahly Tripoli; (Libya) Ittihad Tripoli
Zone 2	(Guinea) SLAC	(Guinea) MBC; (Mali) USFAS Bamako
Zone 3	(Nigeria) Rivers Hoopers; (Nigeria) Civil Defenders; (Benin) Elan Sportif	(Ghana) Custom Braves; (Liberia) Harbel Pointer; (Niger) AS Police
Zone 4	(Democratic Republic of the Congo) BC Terreur; (Democratic Republic of the Congo) ASB Mazembe	(Gabon) CAS 1987 Le Phoenix; (Equatorial Guinea) San Antonio; (Equatorial Guinea) Jet 7 CB
Zone 5	(Egypt) Al Ahly, (Egypt) Smouha, (Rwanda) REG	Ethiopia Water; (Ethiopia) Wolekite City; (Kenya) KPA; (Kenya) Strathmore; (Rwanda) Patriots; (Tanzania) JKT; (Tanzania) Oilers
Zone 6	(Mozambique) Ferroviário da Beira, (Angola) Primeiro de Agosto, (Angola) Petro Luanda	(Mozambique) Ferroviário de Maputo; (Malawi) Bravehearts; (Malawi) Central Knight; (Zimbabwe) Harare City Hornets; (Zimbabwe) Foxes
Zone 7	(Madagascar) COSPN	(Seychelles) Premium Cobras; (Mauritius) Mahebourg Flippers; (Seychelles) Beau Vallon Heat

== Teams ==
A total of 16 teams from 10 countries will contest the league.

=== Venues and locations ===
Location of teams in 2018–19 FIBA AfroLeague

Team	Home city	Arena	Capacity
(Morocco) AS Salé	Salé	Salle El Bouâzzaoui	2,000
(Tunisia) ES Radès	Tunis	Salle Taoufik-Bouhima	3,500
(Tunisia) JS Kairouan	Kairouan	Salle Aziz Miled	2,000
(Guinea) SLAC	Conakry	Palais de Sport du Stade du 28 Septembre	–
(Nigeria) Rivers Hoopers	Port Harcourt	Rivers State Basketball Complex	2,000
(Nigeria) Civil Defenders	Abuja	Abuja Sports Hall	3,000
(Benin) Elan Sportif	Porto-Novo	Hall des Arts Loisirs et Sports Boulevard Saint-Michel (Note: Despite being from Porto-Novo, Elan Sportif hosted the team games at the Hall des Arts Loisirs et Sports Boulevard Saint-Michel (H.A.L.S.) in Cotonou.)	–
(Democratic Republic of the Congo) BC Terreur	Kinshasa	Martyrs Sports Complex	2,000
(Democratic Republic of the Congo) BC Mazembe	Lubumbashi		–
(Egypt) Al Ahly	Cairo	Al Ahly Sports Hall	3,500
(Egypt) Smouha	Alexandria	Ittihad Sports Arena	2,000
(Mozambique) Ferroviário da Beira	Beira	Estádio do Ferroviário Indoor Hall	–
(Angola) Primeiro de Agosto	Luanda	Pavilhão Victorino Cunha	1,500
(Angola) Petro de Luanda	Luanda	Pavilhão da Cidadela	6,873
(Madagascar) COSPN	Antananarivo	Palais des Sports Mahamasina	7,090
(Rwanda) REG	Kigali	Amahoro Indoor Stadium	2,500

== Schedule ==
Phase	Round	Draw date	Games
Group stage		January 12, 2019	February 8 – March 10, 2019
Elite 8	First leg	January 12, 2019	March 22, 2019
Elite 8	Second leg	January 12, 2019	April 14, 2019
Final Four	Semi-finals	April 27, 2019	May 24 and May 26, 2019
Final Four	Final and third place	April 27, 2019	May 24 and May 26, 2019

== Group stage ==
The draw was held in Abidjan on 12 January 2019.

The two teams with the best records for each group qualified to Elite 8.

=== Group A ===
Pos	Team	Pld	W	L	GF	GA	GD	Pts	Qualification
1	(Morocco) AS Salé (H)	3	3	0	272	222	+50	6	Advance to Elite 8
2	(Tunisia) JS Kairouan	3	2	1	241	212	+29	5	Advance to Elite 8
3	(Nigeria) Rivers Hoopers	3	1	2	205	254	−49	4	
4	(Guinea) SLAC	3	0	3	233	263	−30	3	

Source: FIBA
(H) Hosts

=== Group B ===
Pos	Team	Pld	W	L	GF	GA	GD	Pts	Qualification
1	(Tunisia) ES Radès	3	3	0	236	187	+49	6	Advance to Elite 8
2	(Nigeria) Civil Defenders	3	2	1	209	213	−4	5	Advance to Elite 8
3	(Benin) Élan Sportif (H)	3	1	2	193	207	−14	4	
4	(Democratic Republic of the Congo) Terreur	3	0	3	185	216	−31	3	

Source: FIBA
(H) Hosts

=== Group C ===
Pos	Team	Pld	W	L	GF	GA	GD	Pts	Qualification
1	(Angola) Primeiro de Agosto	3	3	0	243	196	+47	6	Advance to Elite 8
2	(Egypt) Al Ahly (H)	3	2	1	241	239	+2	5	Advance to Elite 8
3	(Rwanda) REG	3	1	2	226	225	+1	4	
4	(Mozambique) Ferroviário da Beira	3	0	3	209	259	−50	3	

Source: FIBA
(H) Hosts

=== Group D ===
Pos	Team	Pld	W	L	GF	GA	GD	Pts	Qualification
1	(Egypt) Smouha	3	3	0	276	177	+99	6	Advance to Elite 8
2	(Angola) Petro de Luanda	3	2	1	235	216	+19	5	Advance to Elite 8
3	(Democratic Republic of the Congo) ASB Mazembe	3	1	2	220	222	−2	4	
4	(Madagascar) COSPN (H)	3	0	3	196	312	−116	3	

Source: FIBA
(H) Hosts

== Knockout phase ==
=== Bracket ===
Elite 8
(Morocco) AS Salé	69	96	165
(Nigeria) Civil Defenders	69	77	146
(Tunisia) ES Radès	67	73	140
(Tunisia) JS Kairouan	68	74	142
(Angola) Primeiro de Agosto	70	74	144
(Angola) Petro	57	57	114
(Egypt) Al Ahly	82	88	170
(Egypt) Smouha	91	88	179

Final four
(Morocco) AS Salé	81
(Tunisia) JS Kairouan	73
(Angola) Primeiro de Agosto	86
(Egypt) Smouha	76

Final
(Morocco) AS Salé	71
(Angola) Primeiro de Agosto	83
Third place
(Tunisia) JS Kairouan	58
(Egypt) Smouha	69

=== Elite 8 ===
The Elite 8 games were played in a home and away basis from March 22, to April 14, 2019.

Team 1	Agg.	Team 2	1st leg	2nd leg
Civil Defenders (Nigeria)	146–165	(Morocco) AS Salé	69–69	77–96
JS Kairouan (Tunisia)	142–140	(Tunisia) ES Radès	68–67	74–73
Petro de Luanda (Angola)	114–144	(Angola) Primeiro de Agosto	57–70	57–74
Smouha (Egypt)	179–163	(Egypt) Al Ahly	91–82	88–81

=== Final Four ===
On 19 April 2019, the Kilamba Arena in Luanda, Angola was announced as host of the Final Four. The draw was held on 27 April 2019 in Abidjan.

==== Semifinals ====
24 May 2019	AS Salé (Morocco)	81–73	(Tunisia) JS Kairouan	Luanda
	Scoring by quarter: 19–20, 27–15, 19–17, 16–21
	Pts: Wood 27; Rebs: Choua 10; Asts: El Ghazi, El Mahsini 4 each Eff: Kourdou 24	Boxscore	Pts: Gilbert 24; Rebs: Nguirane 14; Asts: Dhif 7 Eff: Slimane 19	Arena: Kilamba Arena

24 May 2019	Primeiro de Agosto (Angola)	86–76	(Egypt) Smouha	Luanda
	Scoring by quarter: 20–25, 24–12, 30–17, 12–22
	Pts: Harris 24; Rebs: Mingas 12; Asts: Costa, Quezada 7 Eff: Mingas 35	Boxscore	Pts: Justice Jr. 23; Rebs: Sarhan 6 Asts: Justice Jr. 5 Eff: Justice Jr. 20	Arena: Kilamba Arena

==== Third place game ====
26 May 2019	JS Kairouan (Tunisia)	58–69	(Egypt) Smouha	Luanda
18:30	Scoring by quarter: 14–24, 12–13, 17–17, 15–15
	Pts: Gilbert, Kochat 15 each Rebs: Gilbert 14; Asts: Dhif 4 Eff: Kochat 19	Boxscore	Pts: Justice Jr. 22; Rebs: Okosun 15; Asts: Justice Jr. 3 Eff: Okosun 23	Arena: Kilamba Arena

==== Final ====
26 May 2019	AS Salé (Morocco)	71–83	(Angola) Primeiro de Agosto	Luanda
18:30	Scoring by quarter: 17–26, 17–16, 19–13, 18–28
	Pts: Arnold 21; Rebs: Najah 13; Asts: El Mahsini 5 PIR: Najah 18	Boxscore	Pts: Mingas; Rebs: Mingas 11; Asts: Quezada 7 PIR: Quezada 21	Arena: Kilamba Arena; Attendance: 5,500

== Awards ==
The individual awards were announced on May 26, after the conclusion of the final.

- Most Valuable Player: (Angola) Eduardo Mingas (Primeiro de Agosto)
- All-Star Team:
  - (Angola) Eduardo Mingas (Primeiro de Agosto)
  - (Morocco) Soufiane Kourdou (AS Salé)
  - (Dominican Republic) Manny Quezada (Primerio de Agosto)
  - (Morocco) Abderrahim Najah (AS Salé)
  - (United States) James Justice Jr. (Smouha)

== Statistics ==
Statistics as of the ending of the season.

=== Individual statistical leaders ===
Category	Player	Team(s)	Statistic
Efficiency per game	Maodo Nguirane	JS Kairouan	21.7
Points per game	Reggie Holmes	Al Ahly	20.2
Rebounds per game	Todd O'Brien	Al Ahly	14.0
Assists per game	Ahmed Dhif	JS Kairouan	5.7
Steals per game	Reggie Holmes	Al Ahly	2.6
Blocks per game	Mohamed Choua	AS Salé	2.0
Turnovers per game	James Justice Jr.	Smouha	3.0
Minutes per game	James Justice Jr.	Smouha	34.1
FG%	Augustine Okosun	Smouha	59.0%
3P%	Ahmed Azab Farag	Smouha	60.0%
Double-doubles	Maodo Nguirane	JS Kairouan	4
Double-doubles	Todd O'Brien	Al Ahly	4

=== Individual game highs ===
Category	Player	Team(s)	Statistic
Efficiency	Eduardo Mingas	Primeiro de Agosto	35
Efficiency	Abderrahim Najah	AS Salé	35
Points	Manny Quezada	Primeiro de Agosto	36
Rebounds	Aubin Junior Kasongo	BC Mazembe	23
Assists	Yassine El Mahsini	AS Salé	13
Steals	Carlos Cabral	Primeiro de Agosto	8
Blocks	Nick West	ES Radès	5
Turnovers	Engelbert Beleck	REG	8
2-point field goals	Elhadji Mbodji	ES Radès	12
3-point field goals	Reggie Holmes	Al Ahly	7
