= Maodo =

Maodo is a masculine given name. Notable people with the name include:

- Maodo Lô (born 1992), German basketball player
- Maodo Malick Mbaye (born 1995), Senegalese footballer
- Maodo Nguirane (born 1993), Senegalese basketball player
