= Soehardjono Sastromihardjo =

Indonesian diplomat (born 1955)

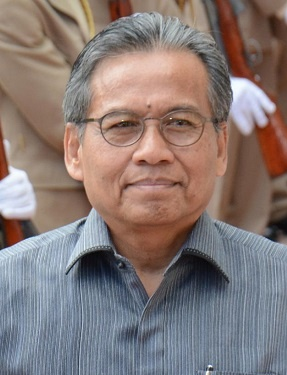
- Soehardjono in 2017

Ambassador of Indonesia to Kenya, DR Congo, Mauritius, Seychelles, Somalia, Uganda, the UNEP, and the United Nations Human Settlements Programme
- In office 25 February 2016 – 14 September 2020
- President: Joko Widodo
- Preceded by: Sunu Mahadi Soemarmo
- Succeeded by: Mohamad Hery Saripudin

Ambassador of Indonesia to Cambodia
- In office 20 January 2010 – 24 December 2013
- President: Susilo Bambang Yudhoyono
- Preceded by: I Gede Ngurah Swajaya
- Succeeded by: Pitono Purnomo

Personal details
- Born: July 29, 1955 (age 71)
- Spouse: Theresia M. Adam
- Children: 1
- Education: University of Indonesia (Drs.); University of East Anglia (M.A.)

Soehardjono Sastromihardjo (born 29 July 1955) is an Indonesian diplomat who last served as ambassador to Kenya, with concurrent accreditation to the Democratic Republic of the Congo, Mauritius, Seychelles, Somalia, Uganda, the UNEP, and the United Nations Human Settlements Programme. Previously, he served as ambassador to Cambodia and chief of foreign ministry's center for education and training.

== Early life and education ==
Born on 29 July 1955, Soehardjono studied English literature with a specialization on America at the University of Indonesia. He received his bachelor's degree in 1982 with a dissertation on American utopian communities. Upon joining the foreign service, Soehardjono pursued a master's degree in development studies at the University of East Anglia, which he completed in 1994.

== Career ==
Soehardjono commenced his diplomatic career in 1984. According to a later interview, he was drawn to the diplomatic field primarily because he enjoyed traveling, viewing it as the best way to visit new places, serve his country, and expose his family to different cultures. He began his career as a vice consul in New York on 13 November 1987, serving until 1991. After serving in New York, Soehardjono was stationed in Cambodia as an international polling station officer during the 1993 Cambodian general election conducted by the United Nations Transitional Authority in Cambodia (UNTAC). On one occasion, Soehardjono's UNTAC convoy was intercepted and he was held at gunpoint by Khmer Rouge forces in Kampong Cham. After he repeatedly shouted "Indonesia", the guerilla forces lowered their guns and retreated.

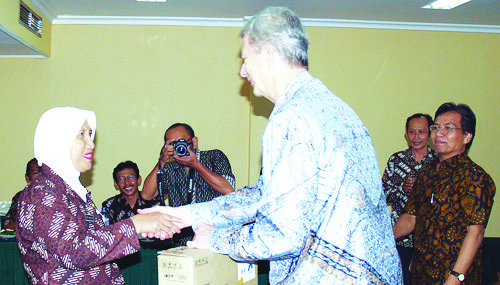
Soehardjono (right) overseeing the handover of assistance to a state elementary school from the Dutch ambassador

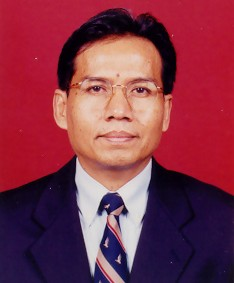
Soehardjono during his service at the embassy in Washington, D.C.

After receiving his master's degree, Soehardjono was posted in Marseille, France, as a consul in the consulate general from 1995 to 1999. By 2002, he was appointed to the embassy in Washington, D.C., as chief of information section with the diplomatic rank of counsellor. In 2003, he was promoted to the rank of minister counsellor and became the chief of political affairs division, serving until 2005. He was recalled and appointed as chief of ministry and mission administration bureau on 28 December 2005, to 2007, followed by a tenure as director of information and media from 11 May 2007 to 2010. In 2009, Soehardjono oversaw the launching of the foreign department's new portal with a capacity ten times greater than its predecessor and costed the department one and a half billion rupiahs.

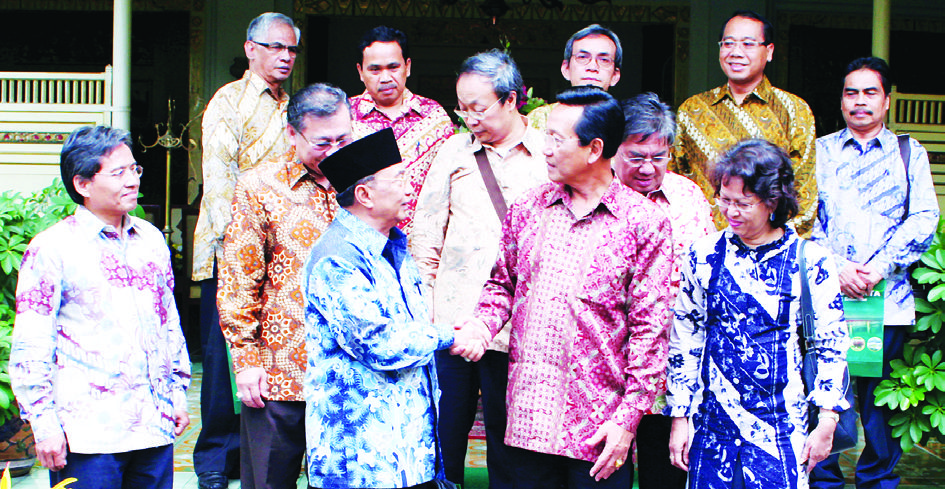
Soehardjono (left) with other ambassador candidates during a reception by the Governor of Yogyakarta Hamengkubuwono X

On 20 January 2010, Soehardjono was installed as ambassador to Cambodia by President Susilo Bambang Yudhoyono. He presented his credentials to the King of Cambodia Norodom Sihamoni on 27 May 2010. Early in his term, Soehardjono projected that the trade between Cambodia and Indonesia would grow by twenty percent per annum. During the 2011 ASEAN Summit in Bali, Prime Minister of Cambodia Hun Sen requested Soehardjono to encourage Indonesia to import rice from Cambodia instead of via other countries, establish direct flights between Indonesia and Cambodia to boost tourism, and for Telkom Indonesia to invest in CamGSM, a Cambodian telecom provider. In the next year's ASEAN Summit held in Cambodia, Soehardjono oversaw the signing of agreement for Indonesia to purchase 100,000 metric tons of rice per year from Cambodia for the next five years. Despite his successes in facilitating trade and peace, Soehardjono was criticized for his lack of attention regarding the presence of two elusive corruption case fugitives, Nunun Nurbaeti and Muhammad Nazaruddin, who fled to Cambodia to evade investigation by Indonesian authorities. He announced his departure to Norodom Sihamoni on 20 December 2013.

On 10 January 2014, Soehardjono was installed as the chief of the foreign ministry's education and training center. In November 2014, he signed an agreement with his counterpart, the Netherlands Institute of International Relations Clingendael, regarding cooperation in diplomatic training.

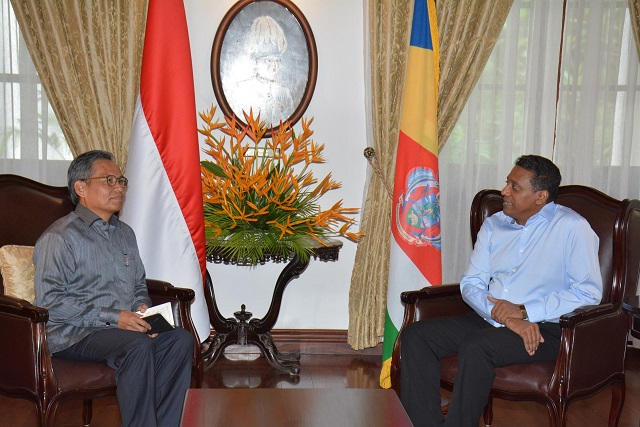
Soehardjono Sastromihardjo with President of Seychelles Danny Faure at the presentation of his credentials

On 6 August 2015, President Joko Widodo nominated Soehardjono as ambassador to Kenya, with concurrent accreditation to Democratic Republic of the Congo, Mauritius, Seychelles, Somalia, Uganda, the UNEP, and the United Nations Human Settlements Programme, to the House of Representatives. Upon being assessed by the House of Representative's first commission on 16 September 2015, he was installed on 13 January 2016.

Soehardjono presented his credentials to the President of Kenya Uhuru Kenyatta on 9 June 2016, President of Uganda Yoweri Museveni on 23 November 2016, President of Seychelles Danny Faure on 10 January 2017, and the President of Somalia Mohamed Abdullahi Mohamed on 22 January 2019. As ambassador, Soehardjono prioritized improving international relations and faced challenges in convincing others of Indonesia's status as the world's largest archipelago and the largest economy in Southeast Asia. During his tenure, the Uganda-Indonesia Friendship Association was established in February 2018. He departed Nairobi on 21 August 2020. For his service as ambassador in Nairobi, on 14 August 2023, Soehardjono received the Bintang Jasa (Star of Service), 2nd class.

Upon his retirement from the diplomatic service, Soehardjono joined the Indonesian Council on World Affairs and became the deputy chairman of its executive council.

== Personal life ==
Sastromihardjo is married to Theresia M. Adam and has one daughter.
