= Artauli Tobing =

Indonesian diplomat (born 1950)

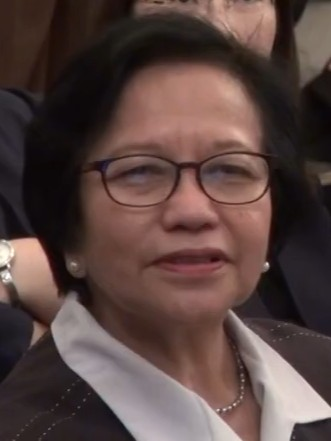

Chief of the Foreign Ministry Policy Assessment and Development Agency
- In office 11 May 2007 – 2010
- President: Susilo Bambang Yudhoyono
- Preceded by: Nicholas Tandi Dammen
- Succeeded by: Andri Hadi (acting); Wardana

Ambassador of Indonesia to Vietnam
- In office 20 November 2003 – February 2007
- President: Megawati Sukarnoputri; Susilo Bambang Yudhoyono
- Preceded by: Aiyub Mohsin
- Succeeded by: Pitono Purnomo

Personal details
- Born: 1950 (age 75–76) Jakarta, Indonesia
- Spouse: Bistok P. L. Tobing
- Relations: Chairul Saleh (uncle)
- Parent: Bonar Panggabean (father)
- Education: University of Indonesia (Drs.); George Washington University (MA)
- Occupation: Diplomat

Artauli Ratna Menara Panggabean Tobing (born 1950) is an Indonesian career diplomat who served as ambassador to Vietnam from 2003 to 2007 and chief of the foreign ministry policy assessment and development agency from 2007 to 2010.

== Early life and education ==
Artauli was born in Jakarta in 1950. Her father, Bonar Panggabean, was Antara's representative at the United Nations, and her uncle was deputy prime minister Chairul Saleh. She studied English literature at the University of Indonesia, which she completed in 1976. On the same year, she received a Fulbright scholarship to pursue master of arts in American studies at the George Washington University.

== Diplomatic career ==
Artauli joined the diplomatic service in 1981. Her maiden assignment overseas was at the permanent mission in Vienna in August 1984, where she interned with the rank of attaché before being promoted to the rank of third secretary. She served in the mission until August 1988 and returned to the foreign ministry. Artauli then returned to another posting abroad at the mission to the European Economic Community, where she handled economic matters with the rank of first secretary, effective 10 August 1992.

After four years in Brussels, Artauli returned to the foreign ministry in August 1996. She was then sent to the political section of the embassy in Canada in June 1999 with the rank of counsellor. She was later promoted to the rank of minister counsellor and, in 2001, became the embassy's chargé d'affaires ad interim following the departure of ambassador Budiman Darmosutanto.

On 3 May 2002, Artauli was sworn in as the chief of the foreign ministry international organizations policy assessment and development agency. She departed from Canada for her new post two months after she was sworn in. About a year later, on 20 November 2003 Artauli was sworn in as ambassador to Vietnam. She presented her credentials to president Trần Đức Lương on 10 February 2004. Four days later, she introduced herself to Indonesians in Vietnam. Artauli received the Medal for Peace and Friendship among Nations from the Vietnam Union of Friendship Organisations at the end of her ambassadorial term on 6 February 2007. On 11 May that year she was sworn in as the chief of the foreign ministry policy assessment and development agency. In September 2009, Artauli was nominated as ambassador to France to replace the late Arizal Effendi, but her nomination was cancelled later on.

Artauli served as the agency's head until her retirement on 2010, in which she was replaced by director general of information and public diplomacy Andri Hadi in an acting capacity. She then served as executive secretary to the presidential advisor on international relations, Hassan Wirajuda, from March 2011 to October 2014. She represented Indonesia as an eminent person at the 2015 Indian Ocean Dialogue. Within the academia, Artauli taught at the Paramadina University and the foreign ministry's senior diplomatic courses. Artauli represented Indonesia in the advisory board of the ASEAN Institute for Peace and Reconciliation from 2014 to 2017 and in its governing council from 2017 to 2021.

== Personal life ==
Artauli is married to Bistok P. L. Tobing.
