= Nicholas Tandi Dammen =

Indonesian diplomat

Ambassador of Indonesia to South Korea
- In office 30 January 2009 – 1 October 2012
- President: Susilo Bambang Yudhoyono
- Preceded by: Jacob Samuel Halomoan Lumban Tobing
- Succeeded by: John A. Prasetio

Deputy Secretary General of ASEAN for Economic Cooperation
- In office 1 February 2006 – 31 January 2009
- Preceded by: Pengiran Mashor Pengiran Ahmad
- Succeeded by: Sayakane Sisouvong (Political and Security Community)

Chief of the Foreign Ministry Policy Assessment and Development Agency
- In office 31 August 2004 – 1 February 2006
- Preceded by: Ibrahim Yusuf
- Succeeded by: Artauli Tobing

Personal details
- Born: 19 December 1950 (age 75) Makale, South Sulawesi
- Profession: Diplomat

Nicholas Tandi Dammen (born 19 December 1950) is an Indonesian diplomat who served as ambassador to South Korea from 2009 to 2012. A Hasanuddin University graduate, Dammen was the ASEAN deputy secretary general for economic cooperation from 2006 to 2009 and had held senior posts within the foreign ministry, including as chief of the foreign ministry's policy planning and development agency from 2004 to 2006 and director of ASEAN economic cooperation from 1999 to 2001. Throughout his more than 30 years of career, Dammen's posting mostly involved economic issues.

== Early life, education, and personal life ==
Born on December 19, 1950, in Makale, the capital of Tana Toraja Regency, Dammen began his academic journey at Hassanuddin University in Makassar, where he graduated with a degree in political sciences in 1975. He later advanced his studies in the United Kingdom, earning a master of arts from Lincolnshire University in Humberside in 1997. Dammen adheres to the Catholic faith and has four children through his marriage with Lenny Dammen.

== Diplomatic career ==
Dammen began his diplomatic service on 1 December 1975. His first posting abroad was interning at the embassy in Port Moresby with the rank of attache from 1980 to 1982, followed by a tenure as third secretary and head of economic division in Helsinki, Finland, until 1985. Between 1985 and 1987, he worked in Jakarta as a head of section for the directorate general for economic affairs. He then moved to the United Kingdom to serve as second secretary and head of multilateral section at the embassy in London in 1987. He was later promoted to the rank of first secretary and headed the economic division from 1990 to 1991 During this time, from 1987 to 1993, he was a member of the permanent delegation to several international commodity negotiations and the International Maritime Organization.

Following a two-year period as head of division for the directorate general for economic affairs in Jakarta, Dammen was posted to Singapore in 1994. He served head of economic division with the rank of counsellor. During this period, he acted as a liaison officer for Indonesia to the APEC headquarters. In 1996, he was reassigned to the permanent mission in Geneva, Switzerland, serving as head of economic division with the rank of minister counsellor. He handled issues relating to the World Trade Organization during his posting there. In this capacity, he represented Indonesia in WTO negotiations until 1998. He returned to Jakarta in 1999 as the director of economic cooperation for the directorate general of ASEAN affairs, where he participated in numerous meeting relating to ASEAN economic cooperation and the Asia-Europe meeting. From 2001 to 2004, he returned to London to serve as minister and deputy chief of mission under ambassadors Nana Sutresna and Juwono Sudarsono. He acted as chargé d’affaires between the two ambassador's term.

On 31 August 2004, Dammen was appointed chief of the foreign ministry's policy planning and development agency. During his tenure, which lasted until early 2006, he headed the Indonesian delegation to various high-level meetings. His subsequent appointment as deputy secretary general of ASEAN on for economic cooperation on 1 February 2006 saw him representing the secretary general of ASEAN at ministerial negotiations, heading the SOM China-ASEAN Expo, and leading the ASEAN Task Force on Tourism Integration. He also served as a member of the board of the ASEAN Energy Centre until January 2009. He relinquished his post on 31 January 2009 and was succeeded by Sayakane Sisouvong from Laos as the deputy secretary general for political security community on 17 February 2009.

On 30 January 2009, Dammen was sworn in as ambassador to South Korea. He presented his credentials to president Lee Myung-bak on 20 February 2009. As ambassador, Dammen pursued cooperation in bio-fuel development. In 2011, Dammen met with South Korean foreign minister Kim Sung-hwan to verify reports alleging that South Korean intelligence agents broke into an Indonesian delegation’s hotel room to steal classified information regarding a potential arms trade deal. Following reports of attempted purchases of the embassy by Indonesian and South Korean estate developers, Dammen clarified in January 2011 that the embassy "will never move as long as I’m here in Korea." Dammen departed South Korea on 1 October 2012.

== Awards ==
Dammen was awarded the Satyalancana Karya Satya 20 years medal by President Abdurrahman Wahid in 2001 and the Satyalancana Karya Satya 30 years medal by President Susilo Bambang Yudhoyono in 2007.
