= NBA G League Most Improved Player Award =

The NBA G League Most Improved Player is an annual NBA G League (previously known D-League or Development League) award given since the 2009–10 season. The award honors the player who demonstrated the most significant improvement over the course of the regular season. The league's head coaches determine the award by voting and it is usually presented to the honoree during the playoffs.

No player has been named the Most Improved Player more than once. By position, guards have dominated the award, having won in all but two years since its inception. Mildon Ambres was the inaugural winner while playing for the Idaho Stampede.

== Winners ==
Season	Player	Position	Nationality	Team
2009–10	Mildon Ambres	Guard	United States	Idaho Stampede
2010–11	Dar Tucker	Guard	United States	New Mexico Thunderbirds
2011–12	Kenny Hayes	Guard	United States	Maine Red Claws
2012–13	Cameron Jones	Guard	United States	Santa Cruz Warriors
2013–14	Frank Gaines	Guard	United States	Maine Red Claws (2)
2014–15	Joe Jackson	Guard	United States	Bakersfield Jam
2015–16	Axel Toupane	Guard	France	Raptors 905
2016–17	Devondrick Walker	Guard	United States	Delaware 87ers
2017–18	DeQuan Jones	Forward	United States	Fort Wayne Mad Ants
2018–19	Michael Frazier	Guard	United States	Rio Grande Valley Vipers
2019–20	Gabe Vincent	Guard	United States	Sioux Falls Skyforce
2020–21	Anthony Lamb	Forward	United States	Rio Grande Valley Vipers (2)
2021–22	Craig Randall II	Guard	United States	Long Island Nets
2022–23	Lester Quiñones	Guard	United States/ Dominican Republic	Santa Cruz Warriors (2)
2023–24	Alondes Williams	Guard	United States	Sioux Falls Skyforce (2)
2024–25	Elijah Harkless	Guard	United States	Salt Lake City Stars
2025–26	Tristan Enaruna	Forward	Netherlands	Cleveland Charge

== See also ==
- NBA Most Improved Player Award
