= Pitono Purnomo =

Indonesian diplomat (born 1954)

Ambassador of Indonesia to Cambodia
- In office 24 December 2013 – 1 December 2017
- President: Susilo Bambang Yudhoyono; Joko Widodo
- Preceded by: Soehardjono Sastromihardjo
- Succeeded by: Sudirman Haseng

Chief of Foreign Ministry Policy Assessment and Development Agency
- In office 12 April 2012 – 23 April 2014
- Preceded by: Wardana
- Succeeded by: Darmansjah Djumala

Ambassador of Indonesia to Vietnam
- In office 8 April 2008 – 2011
- President: Susilo Bambang Yudhoyono
- Preceded by: Artauli Tobing
- Succeeded by: Mayerfas

Personal details
- Born: 16 March 1954 (age 72)
- Spouse: Sri Ratna Sumariati
- Education: University of Indonesia (Drs.)

Pitono Purnomo (born 16 March 1954) is an Indonesian diplomat who has served in various diplomatic posts, including as ambassador to Cambodia from 2013 to 2017 and ambassador to Vietnam from 2008 to 2011. A University of Indonesia graduate, Pitono was the chief of the foreign ministry's policy assessment agency between his two ambassadorial tenure, and consul general in Osaka before taking up his post in Vietnam.

== Early life, education, and family ==
Pitono was born on 16 March 1954. He is of Chinese descent. He began studying political science at the University of Indonesia in 1973 and graduated with a bachelor's degree in 1980.

Pitono is married to Sri Ratna Sumariati.

== Diplomatic career ==
Pitono began his career in the diplomatic service in December 1980. Throughout his career, Pitono served in a number of diplomatic posts, both abroad and home. He served at the mission to the European Community with the rank of third secretary, starting from 10 January 1986. Between the late 1980s and early 1990s, he was transferred to head the international commodity issues section within the foreign ministry's directorate for multilateral economic cooperation. By 1992, he was posted to the permanent mission in Geneva with the rank of first secretary. Starting from 23 October 1996, he headed the economic section at the embassy in Vienna. He was then recalled to serve as director of developing countries economic relations in the foreign ministry in 2001.

On 3 May 2002, Pitono assumed office as the foreign ministry's director of Asia, Pacific, and Africa intraregional cooperation. During his tenure, he represented Indonesia in the 5th ASEAN-India Senior Officials Meeting at New Delhi on 20 May 2003. He was reassigned to serve as the director of ASEAN functional cooperation on 7 January 2004 for a few months before being posted in Osaka as consul general on December that year.

During his tenure in Osaka, on 19 October 2007 Pitono lodged a complaint to Malaysia's tourism board director in Osaka, Azhari Haron, regarding the usage of Indang Sungai Garinggiang, a West Sumatran song, in a Malaysian dance troupe performance at the Asia Festival 2007. The tourism office failed to attribute either West Sumatra or Indonesia as the song's origin, with the song's lyrics being intentionally altered, thus potentially leading the audience to believe the music and dance were Malaysian in origin. In the same month, he conducted an investigation on an Indonesian women trafficking ring in cooperation with the local police.

Around 2007, Pitono was nominated by President Susilo Bambang Yudhoyono as ambassador to Vietnam. He passed an assessment held by the House of Representatives first commission on 26 November 2007 and was sworn in on 8 April 2008. Shortly after his inauguration, Pitono was instructed by Vice President Jusuf Kalla to increase trade links and conduct market intelligence on potential sectors. He presented his credentials to president Nguyễn Minh Triết on 8 May 2008.

During his tenure, Pitono oversaw cooperations between the two nations in corruption eradication as well as agreements in various areas. He also maintained close coordination with the Vietnam Union of Friendship Organisations (VUFO) and the Vietnam-Indonesia Friendship Association regarding bilateral friendship activities, which led to him receiving the Medal for Peace and Friendship among Nations from VUFO ON 19 August 2011. Pitono promoted investments from Vietnam in Indonesia's fishing and aquaculture economy. Pitono paid a farewell call to president Trương Tấn Sang on 29 August 2011.

After serving in Vietnam, on 12 April 2012 Pitono became the chief of the foreign ministry's policy assessment and development agency. Despite already leaving his ambassadorial posting, Pitono continued to forge Indonesia–Vietnam relations, with him receiving the Friendship Order from foreign minister Phạm Bình Minh on 14 June 2012. He led the Indonesian delegation to the Second Joint Commission for Bilateral Cooperation in August 2012.

Pitono was nominated as ambassador to Cambodia by President Susilo Bambang Yudhoyono on 3 September 2013. His posting from Vietnam to Cambodia was viewed by some as a demotion, which he rebuked. He passed assessment by the House of Representative's first commission on 18 September 2013 and was sworn in on 24 December 2013. He officially began his duties in the country upon presenting his credentials to the King Norodom Sihamoni on 21 April 2014. At the time of his appointment as ambassador, Pitono was one of the two Indonesian diplomats of Chinese descent to serve as ambassador, with the other one being Linggawaty Hakim. In 2015, Pitono was criticized by Meranti Islands regent Irwan Nasir for the slow handling of the repatriation of Indonesian citizens from the Selat Panjang city in Meranti Islands, who were released by an online gambling company. Irwan stated that Pitono was hostile towards the regent and his entourage during their visit to the embassy to collect information.
