= Aiyub Mohsin =

Indonesian diplomat (born 1945)

Ambassador of Indonesia to Vietnam
- In office 29 August 2000 – 31 December 2003
- President: Abdurrahman Wahid; Megawati Sukarnoputri
- Preceded by: Mohammad Ma'ruf
- Succeeded by: Artauli Tobing

Personal details
- Born: 3 October 1945 (age 80) Sungai Jawi, West Kalimantan, Indonesia
- Spouse: Etty Sulastri
- Children: 3
- Education: Universitas Nasional (Drs, Dr.); St. John's University (MA); IPWI School of Economics (MM)

Aiyub Mohsin (born 3 October 1945) is an Indonesian career diplomat who last served as Indonesia's ambassador to Vietnam from 2000 to 2003. Prior to his ambassadorial tenure, Aiyub was assigned to economic-related positions in the foreign ministry and Indonesian representative abroad, as well as in the economic coordinating ministry and the investment ministry.

== Early life and education ==
Born on 3 October 1945 in Sungai Jawi, a village on the edge of the Karimata Strait in West Kalimantan, Aiyub was the son of Aiyub bin Abdullah and Syakriah binti Wadi. Aiyub was raised in a farming community, and by the age of 6 his family moved to a village 15 km away from his birthplace as there were no elementary school in Sungai Jawi. He completed elementary school in 1958. His early aspirations shifted from agricultural science to economics due to a lack of science tracks at his local high school, from which he graduated in 1964. After spending a year supporting his aging parents and younger siblings, he moved to Jakarta in September 1965 to pursue higher education. To fund his studies at the Universitas Nasional, Aiyub worked diverse jobs, including as a shop assistant in Tanah Abang and later as a teacher and principal at a Muhammadiyah elementary school. He earned his doctorandus in political sciences in 1971. Throughout his diplomatic service, Aiyub earned a master of arts in international relations from St. John’s University in New York in 1994 and a master of management in marketing from the IPWI School of Economics in 2000.

== Diplomatic career ==
Mohsin’s entry into the diplomatic service was inspired by classmates who already became foreign department employees. He officially joined the department on 1 October 1973, and after passing rigorous examinations, began his basic diplomatic education in 1974. His early career included roles as the chief of news dispatch before receiving his first overseas posting as an attaché at the embassy in Ankara, Turkey, in 1977. Mohsin's career slowly rise as he completed his mid-level diplomatic training in 1985 and senior diplomatic training in 1990. He also attended a diplomatic course at the University of Oxford in 1982.

From mid-1985 to October 1989, Aiyub led the economic division at the embassy in Singapore. During this period, Aiyub was hands on in promoting Indonesia's economic and business interests through meetings with business stakeholders, seminars, and exhibitions. By the end of his tenure there, Indonesia's trade with Singapore reached nine million dollars with a trade surplus for Indonesia. Aiyub returned to Jakarta on 5 October 1989, and on 30 January 1990 was appointed as the deputy director for economic relations with Organisation of Islamic Cooperation countries. His brief stint ended following his appointment as the consul for economic affairs at the Indonesian consulate general in New York from October 1991 to August 1996, with him officially beginning his duties on 6 January 1992. Aiyub maintained a cordial relations with the Chamber of Commerce of the State of New York and the World Trade Center and introduced Indonesia through lectures in business school as well as television appearances. Aiyub's work resulted in Indonesia maintaining a trade surplus with states under the jurisdiction of the consulate general.

By 3 September 1996, Aiyub returned to Jakarta. He was appointed as deputy assistant for regional cooperation within the coordinating ministry for production and distribution on 10 March 1997. Aiyub was put in charge of managing economic relations within the ASEAN and Asia–Europe Meeting framework. Afterwards, he briefly undertook a course at the National Resilience Institute from April to December 1998. Following the fall of Suharto, Aiyub transitioned into the investment ministry, which was double hatted with the investment coordinating board. Aiyub was appointed by investment minister Hamzah Haz, who also hailed from West Kalimantan, as his senior advisor for macro investment economy on 11 January 1999. Less than a year later, Hamzah was replaced by Marzuki Usman, and he became the board's deputy for international cooperation on 5 August 1999. During his tenure in the investment ministry, Aiyub led an economic mission to the international investment exhibition at Geneva in April 1999.

Aiyub's term in the investment ministry ended in March 2000. He returned to the foreign ministry and was later informed of his nomination as ambassador to Vietnam. After passing an assessment by the House of Representatives, he was sworn in as ambassador on 29 August 2000. He arrived in Hanoi on 22 October and received his duties from the embassy's chargé d'affaires ad interim two days later. He presented his credentials to president Trần Đức Lương on 8 November. During his ambassadorial tenure, Aiyub oversaw an increase in intensity between the two country's bilateral relations, with visits by president Megawati Sukarnoputri to Hanoi resulted in a number of bilateral agreements in maritime boundaries, visa exemption, trade, energy and oil, and coffee exporting association. Aiyub's ambassadorial term ended in 31 December 2003, with his replacement Artauli Tobing having been installed a month before.

== Later life ==
After his retirement, Aiyub returned to his almamater and taught international relations. He took doctorate studies in political sciences during his retirement, with political science professor Maswadi Rauf as his advisor. During the writing of his thesis, he had to be brought to the emergency department twice. His thesis, titled The Achievements of the National Awakening Party in the 2014 Legislative Elections, was defended on 17 November 2017 with a very satisfactory distinction.

== Personal life ==
Aiyub is married to Etty Sulastri and has three children. Aiyub is a devout Muslim.
