= Cameron Echols =

American retired basketball player

Personal information
- Born: January 22, 1981 (age 45) Chicago, Illinois
- Listed height: 6 ft 8 in (2.03 m)
- Listed weight: 220 lb (100 kg)

Career information
- High school: Simeon (Chicago, Illinois)
- College: Tallahassee CC (2000–2001); Kennedy–King College (2001–2002); Ball State (2002–2004)
- NBA draft: 2004: undrafted
- Playing career: 2004–2014
- Position: Power forward / center

Career history
- 2004–2005: KR
- 2005–2006: Aveiro Basket
- 2006–2006: Boncourt
- 2006–2007: Belenenses Hyundai Lusifor
- 2007–2008: Alaior Opel Jovent
- 2008: Atletico Cordon
- 2008–2009: Alerta Cantabria Lobos
- 2010–2011: Maxaquene
- 2011–2012: Njarðvík
- 2012–2014: Rotterdam

Career highlights
- All-ACC First Team (2010); Icelandic All-Star (2012)

Cameron Gabriel Echols (born January 22, 1981) is an American retired basketball player. The Chicago, Illinois native has a Dutch citizenship. Standing at 6 ft 8 in (2.03 m), Echols usually played as power forward.

In October 2019 Echols was arrested for domestic battery in Muncie, Indiana.

== Professional career ==
Echols first professional stop was with KR of the Icelandic Úrvalsdeild karla in October 2004. On October 17, he requested to be released from his contract, siding his unhappiness in Reykjavík and homesickness. KR granted his wish but he rescinded on his request shortly after that and continued playing for the club. After a rough start for KR, the team started to play better with Aaron Harper's arrival in January. Echols play especially improved, and in five games in January he averaged 30.6 points and 15.2 rebounds. He helped KR win 7 of their last 11 games, making the playoffs as the 7th seed. In the playoffs, they fell to Snæfell in the first round, 1–2.

Echols returned to Iceland in 2011 when he signed with Njarðvík. He was named to the 2012 Icelandic All-Star game where he scored 10 points. He helped Njarðvík to the playoffs where they were swept by Grindavík in the first round. For the season he averaged 22.4 points and 11.1 rebound per game.

== Awards and honors ==
- All-MAC Honorable Mention: 2004
- Icelandic All-Star: 2012
