= Elan Sportif =

- League: Benin Basketball Super League
- Location: Porto-Novo, Benin
Home	Away

Elan Sportif is a Beninese basketball club based in Porto-Novo. The team plays in the Benin Basketball Super League, the highest level of basketball in the country. The team played in the FIBA Africa Basketball League in the 2018–19 season. In Group B, Élan finished with a 1–2 record.
