= James Justice Jr. =

American basketball player (born 1989)

Free agent
- Position: Point guard

Personal information
- Born: January 12, 1989 (age 37) Memphis, Tennessee, U.S.
- Listed height: 5 ft 10 in (1.78 m)
- Listed weight: 165 lb (75 kg)

Career information
- College: Southwest Tennessee CC (2008–2010); Martin Methodist (2010–2012)
- NBA draft: 2012: undrafted
- Playing career: 2013–present

Career history
- 2012–2013: US Monastir
- 2014–2015: Club Africain
- 2015–2016: Moncton Magic
- 2016: Qatar SC
- 2017: Al-Gharafa
- 2018: Sharjah
- 2018: Al-Ahli Jeddah
- 2018–2019: Smouha
- 2020–2022: Gezira
- 2022: Al-Ahli Tripoli
- 2022–2023: Ohud Medina
- 2023: City Oilers

Career highlights
- Africa Basketball League All-Star Team (2019); NBL Canada Newcomer of the Year (2016); Tunisian League champion (2015)

James Justice Jr. (born January 12, 1989) is an American-Syrian basketball player who last played for the City Oilers.

== College career ==
In 2012, despite being listed at just 5 ft 10 in (1.78 m) and featuring for an NAIA basketball team (Martin Methodist University), Justice won the NCAA Slam Dunk Contest after being voted in by fans after the original field had been announced.

== Professional career ==
Justice Jr. started his professional career in Tunisia with US Monastir, in 2012. In the 2014–15 season, Justice played with Club Africain.

In 2015, Justice Jr. played with the Moncton Magic in the NBL Canada. He averaged 19.6 points, 5 rebounds and 4.5 assists for the team and was named the league's Newcomer of the Year. He left the Magic after the season to play for Qatar SC.

One year later, in 2017, he played for Al-Gharafa.

In September 2018, Justice Jr. signed with Egyptian club Smouha in the 2018–19 FIBA Africa Basketball League. He averaged a team-high 19.6 points over seven games. He was named to the All-Star Team after the season.

Since 2020, Justice Jr. plays in Egypt with Gezira.

Justice Jr. was revealed to be on the roster of the Ugandan team City Oilers for the 2023 BAL season, in April 2023. He averaged 19.9 points, 5.6 rebounds and 3.4 assists in five games in the Nile Conference.

== BAL career statistics ==
Legend
GP	Games played	GS	Games started	MPG	Minutes per game
FG%	Field goal percentage	3P%	3-point field goal percentage	FT%	Free throw percentage
RPG	Rebounds per game	APG	Assists per game	SPG	Steals per game
BPG	Blocks per game	PPG	Points per game	**Bold**	Career high

Year	Team	GP	GS	MPG	FG%	3P%	FT%	RPG	APG	SPG	BPG	PPG
2023	City Oilers	5	5	34.6	.395	.280	1.000	5.4	3.6	1.2	.0	19.0
