= Civil Defenders =

Basketball club from Abuja, Nigeria

- Nickname: Concrete lions
- Leagues: Nigerian Premier League
- Founded: 2005
- Arena: Abuja National Indoor Sports Hall
- Capacity: 3,000
- Location: Abuja, Nigeria
- Team manager: Olalekan Oseni
- Ownership: Nigeria security and civil defense corp'
Home	Away

Civil Defenders, also known as Defenders Basketball, is a Nigerian professional basketball club from Abuja. The club competes in the Nigerian Premier League.

The Defenders competed in the FIBA Africa Basketball League in 2018–19.

== In African competitions ==
FIBA Africa Basketball League (1 appearances)

2018–19 – Quarterfinals
