= Soufiane Kourdou =

Moroccan basketball player (born 1985)

No. 48 – FUS
- Position: Center
- League: FIBA Africa Club Champions Cup; Nationale 1

Personal information
- Born: 21 May 1985 (age 41) Oujda, Morocco
- Listed height: 6 ft 11 in (2.11 m)

Career information
- Playing career: 2005–present

Career history
- 2005–present: AS Salé

Career highlights
- ACC champion (2017); ABL All-Star Team (2019); 9× Moroccan League champion (2010, 2011, 2014–2018, 2021, 2022); 10× Moroccan Cup champion (2005, 2007, 2009–2012, 2014–2018)
Medals
Men's basketball
Representing Morocco
FIBA AfroCan
Gold medal – first place	Angola 2023

Soufiane Kourdou (born 21 May 1985) is a Moroccan professional basketball player. He currently plays for the AS Salé club of the FIBA Africa Club Champions Cup and the Nationale 1, Morocco's first division.

He represented Morocco's national basketball team at the 2017 AfroBasket in Tunisia and Senegal where he was Morocco's best free throw shooter.

At the 2017 Arab Nations Cup in Egypt, he was the tournament's dominant scorer as he recorded 18.6 points per game. Kourdou won the 2023 FIBA AfroCan with Morocco, his first international medal.

== BAL career statistics ==
Legend
GP	Games played	GS	Games started	MPG	Minutes per game
FG%	Field goal percentage	3P%	3-point field goal percentage	FT%	Free throw percentage
RPG	Rebounds per game	APG	Assists per game	SPG	Steals per game
BPG	Blocks per game	PPG	Points per game	**Bold**	Career high

Year	Team	GP	GS	MPG	FG%	3P%	FT%	RPG	APG	SPG	BPG	PPG
2021	AS Salé	4	0	17.6	.154	.000	.667	1.8	1.0	.8	.8	2.5
Career		4	0	17.6	.154	.000	.667	1.8	1.0	.8	.8	2.5
