= Maodo Nguirane =

Senegalese basketball player (born 1993)

Maodo Malick Nguirane
No. 19 – SLAC
- Position: Power forward / center
- League: Road to BAL

Personal information
- Born: 10 November 1993 (age 33) Yeumbeul, Senegal
- Listed height: 6 ft 11 in (2.11 m)
- Listed weight: 233 lb (106 kg)

Career information
- Playing career: 2011–present

Career history
- 2011–2015: Unicaja Málaga
- 2011–2014: → Clínicas Rincón
- 2015–2016: Basket Navarra Club
- 2016–2017: Amics Castelló
- 2017: Academic Plovdiv
- 2017–2022: Fundación CB Granada
- 2022–2023: Basket Zaragoza
- 2023–present: SLAC

Maodo Malick Nguirane (born 10 November 1993 in Yeumbeul, Senegal) is a Senegalese international basketball player who plays for Basket Zaragoza of the Liga ACB, the top basketball division in Spain.

== Pro career ==
Nguirane arrived to Spain in 2007, at the age of 14, to join Club Baloncesto Torrejón.

After several seasons at the youth teams of Unicaja Málaga, in the 2013–14 season he played for the Clínicas Rincón of LEB Oro. In the summer of 2014 he signed a contract with Unicaja Málaga, and he became a part of the roster of the team, playing both the Liga ACB and the Euroleague.

In the summer of 2016 he signed for TAU Castelló of LEB Oro, and became a decisive player in his team, averaging 10 points, 6.4 rebounds and 1.2 blocks per game.

In October-November 2023, he played for Guinean team SLAC in the 2024 tournament of the Road to BAL.

In december 2023, he sign with EAB Angers in France

== National team ==
In March, 2017, he was selected to participate with the Senegal National team in the FIBA AfroBasket 2017 qualifiers. Nguirane played 3 games, and Senegal qualified for the Tournament.
