= Eduardo Mingas =

Angolan basketball player (born 1979)

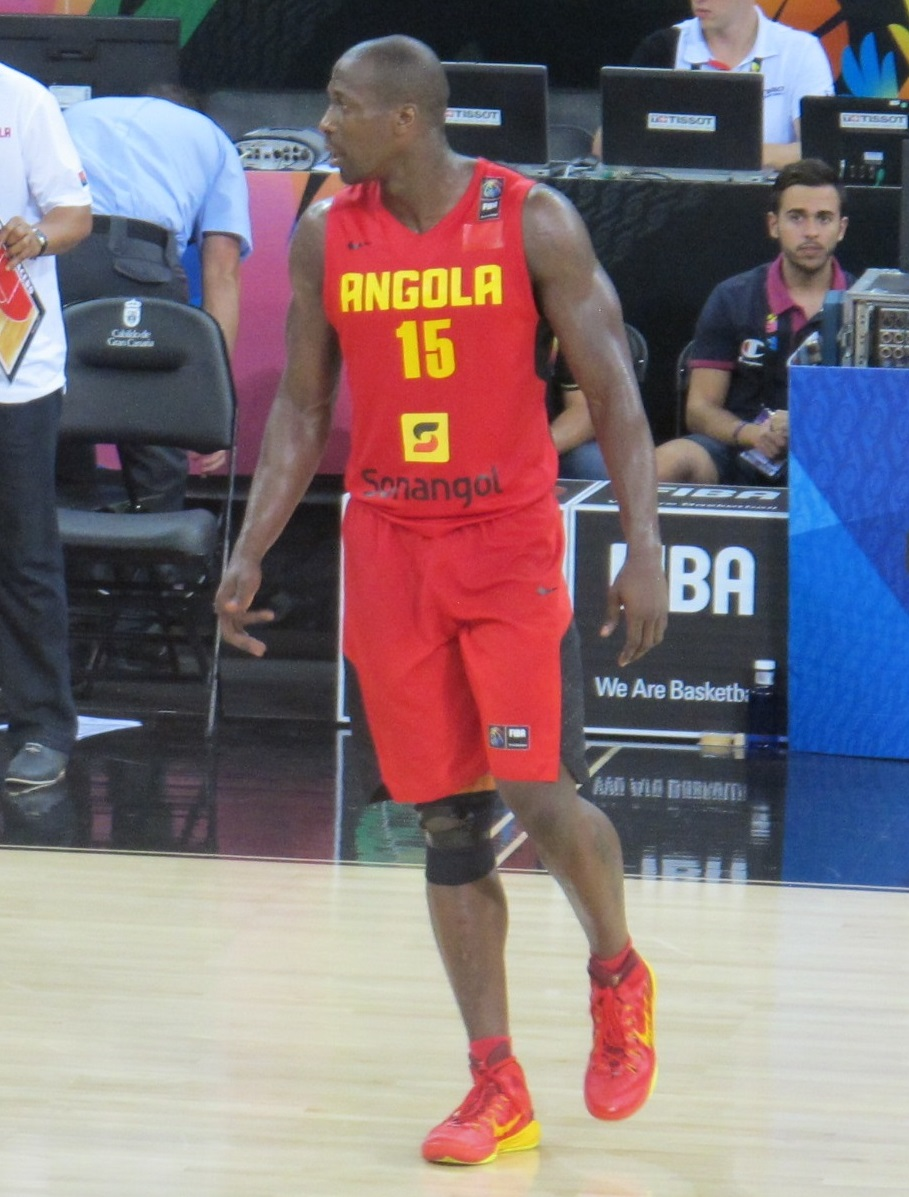
- Mingas in 2014

Personal information
- Born: 29 January 1979 (age 47) Saurimo, Angola
- Listed height: 198 cm (6 ft 6 in)
- Listed weight: 106 kg (234 lb)

Career information
- NBA draft: 2001: undrafted
- Playing career: 1995–2022
- Position: Power forward

Career history
- 2000–2005: Interclube
- 2006–2010: Petro de Luanda
- 2010–2013: Interclube
- 2013–2017: Recreativo do Libolo
- 2017–2019: Primeiro de Agosto
- 2019–2021: Petro de Luanda
- 2021–2022: Interclube

Career highlights
- 4× FIBA Africa Champions Cup winner (2006, 2014, 2015, 2019); 2× FIBA Africa Champions Cup MVP (2014, 2019); 5× FIBA Africa Champions Cup All-Star Team (2007, 2009, 2013, 2014, 2019)
Medals
Men's basketball
Representing Angola
AfroBasket
Gold medal – first place	Abidjan 2013	National team
Gold medal – first place	Benghazi 2009	National team
Gold medal – first place	Luanda 2007	National team
Gold medal – first place	Algiers 2005	National team
Silver medal – second place	Antananarivo 2011	National team
Silver medal – second place	Radès 2015	National Team

Eduardo Fernando Mingas (born 29 January 1979) is an Angolan former professional basketball player. Standing at 1.98 m (6 ft 6 in), Mingas primarily plays the power forward position. He is considered one of the best basketball players in Angolan and African basketball history.

== Professional career ==
On 21 October 2021, at age 42, Mingas signed with Interclube for a third stint.

== International career ==
Mingas has represented the Angola at the 2002 World Championship, 2004 Summer Olympics and the 2006 World Championships.
