= Mildon Ambres =

American basketball player (born 1984)

Personal information
- Born: September 12, 1984 (age 42) Opelousas, Louisiana, U.S.
- Listed height: 6 ft 6 in (1.98 m)
- Listed weight: 213 lb (97 kg)

Career information
- High school: Opelousas (Opelousas, Louisiana)
- College: LSU (2002–2003); Southern Miss (2004–2006); Southern Nazarene (2006–2007)
- NBA draft: 2008: undrafted
- Playing career: 2007–2017
- Position: Small forward / shooting guard

Career history
- 2007–2008: CSU Brașov
- 2008–2010: Idaho Stampede
- 2010: Barangay Ginebra Kings
- 2010–2011: CE Lleida Bàsquet
- 2011–2012: Idaho Stampede
- 2012: CDP Santiago
- 2012: Club Nacional
- 2013: CSU Sibiu
- 2014: Al Geish Army
- 2015: Gezira
- 2016: Al Shamal Doha
- 2017: Libertadores de Querétaro

Career highlights
- NBA D-League Most Improved Player (2010); First-team All-SAC (2007); NAIA All-American (2007); SAC Tournament MVP (2007)

Mildon Roy Ambres (born September 12, 1984) is an American former professional basketball player. He played college basketball at Southern Miss and Southern Nazarene.

He was voted the NBA D-League Most Improved Player by coaches at the conclusion of the 2010 season.

== Early years ==
His father, Milton, who played with Southern University and was a high school coach for 26 years, introduced Mildon to the game when he was seven. Ambres lettered three years in basketball at Opelousas High School in Opelousas, Louisiana. As a senior, he averaged 21.2 points, 14 rebounds and 5 assists per game. He was named Honorable Mention Class 4A All-State, as well as lettering in track and football. He chose to play at LSU.

== College career ==
He redshirted his freshman season at LSU during the 2002–03 season. During the fall semester, he transferred, citing a lack of playing time. Ambres chose Southern Miss and sat the 2004–05 season due to NCAA transfer rules.

=== Southern Miss ===
He averaged 7.7 points and 5 rebounds per game his sophomore year in 2004–05. He did, however, score a career-high 21 points at Marquette on February 5, adding 8 rebounds in the 72–81 loss. His junior year was not much better, as he averaged 6.4 points and 4.1 rebounds per game. He did not see eye-to-eye with his new coach, Larry Eustachy, and transferred to Southern Nazarene University, who played in NAIA Division I at the time.

=== Southern Nazarene ===
He averaged 15.2 points, 8.2 rebounds and 0.6 blocks as a senior in 2006–07 at Southern Nazarene, leading the Crimson Storm in all three categories. He was named First Team All-SAC and SAC Tournament MVP after SNU won their first SAC title in nine years.

== Professional career ==
Ambres had an unsuccessful tryout with the Dallas Mavericks in June 2007.

For the 2007–08 season, Ambres joined Romanian club CSU Brașov. He averaged 18.1 points and 8.5 rebounds per contest.

He was drafted 67th overall in the 2008 NBA Development League Draft by the Idaho Stampede, and averaged 6.4 points and 4.2 rebounds per game in limited minutes, but improved the following season. He averaged 14.5 points and 8.1 rebounds per game, being named the NBA D-League Most Improved Player for the 2010 season. He had a career-high 32 points in a 165–153 overtime victory against the Rio Grande Valley Vipers on March 31.

Ambres made the move to Philippine side Barangay Ginebra Kings for eight games, where he averaged 20 ppg, 15.3 rpg and 1.5 apg.

His next destination was CE Lleida Bàsquet in Spain, whom he joined in October 2010, signing a one-year contract.

He returned to the Stampede for 18 games in November 2011.

In February 2012, Ambres joined CDP Santiago, a local Dominican squad.

In September 2012, Ambres joined Club Nacional from the Uruguayan Basketball League.

Ambres returned to Romania in January 2013 when he signed with CSU Sibiu.

As of 2015, he plays for Al Geish Army of the Egyptian Basketball Premier League.

== Personal life ==
Ambres mother, Carol, died in a parking lot after a struggle with breast cancer. One year later, his brother was charged with murder.
