= Ibrahim Yusuf =

Indonesian diplomat (born 1946)

Ambassador of Indonesia to Thailand
- In office 7 October 2004 – 30 April 2008
- President: Megawati Sukarnoputri; Susilo Bambang Yudhoyono
- Preceded by: Sutria Tubagus
- Succeeded by: Mohammad Hatta

Head of the Agency for Policy Assessment and Development
- In office 3 May 2002 – 31 August 2004
- Minister: Hassan Wirajuda
- Preceded by: Mohammad Jusuf
- Succeeded by: Nicholas Tandi Dammen

Ambassador of Indonesia to the United Arab Emirates
- In office 13 June 2000 – 15 May 2002
- President: Abdurrahman Wahid; Megawati Sukarnoputri
- Preceded by: Husny Sunkar
- Succeeded by: Faisal Bafadal

Personal details
- Born: January 17, 1946 (age 80) Tanjungbalai, North Sumatra Indonesia
- Education: Gadjah Mada University (Drs.); Asian Institute of Journalism and Communication (MA)

Ibrahim Yusuf (born 17 January 1946) is an Indonesian career diplomat who served as ambassador to the United Arab Emirates from 2000 to 2002 and to Thailand from 2005 to 2008. Between his two ambassadorial terms, Ibrahim was the chief of the foreign department's agency for policy assessment and development. He also served as Permanent Representative of UNESCAP.

== Early life and education ==
Ibrahim was born on 17 January 1946 in Tanjungbalai. An ethnic Minangkabau, Ibrahim graduated with a bachelor's degree in international relations from the Gadjah Mada University in 1970 and has a master's degree from the Asian Institute of Journalism and Communication in Manila in 1983.

== Diplomatic career ==
Ibrahim's diplomatic career began in 1973. His first overseas assignment was at the embassy in Dhaka, where he was a junior officer in charge of information affairs. He was posted there for five years, from 1977 to 1982, until he was recalled to Indonesia's ASEAN national secretariat as a deputy director. After two years of duty, Ibrahim consecutively became the chief of politics at the embassy in Sofia, Bulgaria (1984–1988) and Canberra, Australia (1990–1995).

Between 1995 and 1997, Ibrahim was the foreign department's director of Africa and Middle East, during which he presided Indonesia's attempt at increasing engagement with the Gulf countries. He was also enrolled for a regular course at the National Resilience Institute during this period, which he completed in 1996. From 1997 to 2000, Ibrahim was the deputy chief of mission of Indonesia's embassy in Beijing. Ibrahim authored a number of articles on international relations in various publications.

At the start of the new millennium, Ibrahim became Indonesia's ambassador to the United Arab Emirates, being sworn in on 13 June 2000. He presented his credentials to president Zayed bin Sultan Al Nahyan on 3 August 2000 and served until 15 May 2002. During the course of his ambassadorship, Ibrahim worked to attract tourism and investment through exhibitions. He also oversaw the setting up of an Indonesian trade center and consulate general in Abu Dhabi. By his last year in the United Arab Emirates, Ibrahim stated that trade between the country reached $1 billion annually. He also received the Civil Servants' Long Service Medal, 1st class, from the president in 2002.

Ibrahim was appointed to lead the foreign department's agency for policy assessment and development on 3 May 2002. After two years of serving in the position, on 31 August 2004 Ibrahim handed over his position to Nicholas Tandi Dammen. He was then appointed as ambassador to Thailand on 7 October 2004 and presented his credentials to King Bhumibol Adulyadej on 7 March 2005. During his tenure, bilateral trade grew by an annual rate of 18%, with a similar upwards trend for investment. Ibrahim also initiated cooperations between higher education institutions in Thailand and Indonesia through an annual Indonesia-Thailand Rectors' Conference, as well as promoting Indonesia's tourism potential through exhibitions in different provinces in Thailand. Ibrahim vacated his position on 30 April 2008. For his role in developing bilateral relations, he received the Knight Grand Cordon (Special Class) of the Order of the White Elephant on 2 May 2008 and from the Mae Fah Luang University in November 2008. President Susilo Bambang Yudhoyono then named him as special envoy for Palestine capacity building in July 2008.
