= Fidel Mendonça =

Cape Verdean basketball player

Prédio
- Position: Point guard
- League: Proliga

Personal information
- Born: 7 July 1984 (age 42) Praia, Cape Verde
- Listed height: 1.87 m (6 ft 2 in)
- Listed weight: 88 kg (194 lb)

Career history
- 2010–2013: Sport Algés e Dafundo
- 2013–2018: AD Bairro
- 2018–2020: Prédio
- 2021–2022: AD Galomar
- 2022–present: Prédio

Career highlights
- FIBA Africa Clubs Champions Cup Top Scorer (2015)

Fidel Teixeira Barbosa Mendonça (born 7 July 1984) is a Cape Verdean basketball player for Prédio and the Cape Verde national basketball team. Standing at 1.87 m (6 ft 1 1/2 in), he plays as shooting guard.

== Club career ==
From 2010 to 2013, Mendonça played in Portugal for second division Proliga club Sport Algés e Dafundo.

Mendonça played several seasons for AD Bairro. He won the Cape Verdean Basketball Championship three times with the team, and was named MVP for four seasons in a row.

In 2018, Mendonça joined Cape Verdean club Prédio. With Prédio, he won the Cape Verdean national championship two times.

For the 2021–22 season, he signed with AD Galomar in the Proliga.

== National team career ==
Mendonça has been a long-time member of the Cape Verde national basketball team, since 2006. He is also the captain of the team.

He helped his country capture the fourth place at AfroBasket 2021, contributing 8 points per game.
