= Manny Quezada =

Dominican-American basketball player (born 1985)

Interclube
- Position: Point guard
- League: Angolan Basketball League

Personal information
- Born: April 13, 1991 (age 35) New York City, New York
- Listed height: 6 ft 3 in (1.91 m)

Career information
- High school: St. Albans School
- College: Rutgers (2004–2005); San Francisco (2005–2009)
- Playing career: 2010–present

Career history
- 2010: Tiburones de Puerto Plata
- 2010–2012: Baloncesto León
- 2012–2013: Joventut Badalona
- 2013–2014: São José Basketball
- 2015–2016: Petro de Luanda
- 2016–2020: Primeiro de Agosto
- 2020: US Monastir
- 2023–present: Interclube

Career highlights
- ACC champion (2015); ACC Most Valuable Player (2015); 2× ACC / ABL All-Star Team (2015, 2019); Angolan League Finals MVP (2015)

Emmanuel "Manny" Quezada is a Dominican-American basketball player who plays for Interclube in the Angolan Basketball League. Standing at 6 ft 3 in (1.91 m), he plays as point guard.

== Career ==
After playing at NCAA with San Francisco University, Quezada started his career in 2010 in the Dominican Republic, where he played for Tiburones de Puerto Plata in the Liga Nacional de Baloncesto.

In summer 2010, Quezada leaves his country and signs for Spanish second division squad Baloncesto León, where he spends two seasons being one of the top scorers of the league.

In August 2012, he joins the Liga ACB, Spanish top league, with one of the most classic teams in Spain: FIATC Joventut.

In his first game at Liga ACB, he becomes the MVP of the week after scoring 27 points in Joventut's win against Lagun Aro GBC by 89–73.

After the injury of the Brazilian player Fúlvio in November 2013, playing for São José Basketball, at NBB, Manny was hired to replace him in this team.

In March 2023, Quezada returned to Angola to play for Interclube.

== The Basketball Tournament (TBT) ==
In the summer of 2017, Quezada competed in The Basketball Tournament on ESPN for the Talladega Knights. Competing for the $2 million grand prize, Quezada scored 16 points, grabbed five rebounds and dished out three assists in the Knights' 78-74 first round loss to Paul's Champion's; a team led by former NBA point guard Earl Boykins. Quezada also played for Talladega during the summer of 2016. In two games, he averaged a team-high 29.5 points, 4.5 assists and 3.5 rebounds as the Knights fell to the City of Gods in the second round.
