= Mustapha Khalfi =

Moroccan basketball player

No. 5 – FAR Rabat
- Position: Point guard
- League: Nationale 1

Personal information
- Born: 1 January 1980 (age 46) Casablanca, Morocco
- Listed height: 5 ft 10 in (1.78 m)

Career information
- Playing career: 2001–present

Career history
- 2000–2005: Raja Casablanca
- 2005–2006: RS Berkane
- 2007–2010: IR Tanger
- 2013: Casablanca Sport Plazza
- 2013–2014: Chabab Rif Al Hoceima
- 2014–2015: AS Essaouira
- 2015–2019: FAR Rabat

Mustapha Khalfi (born 1 January 1980) is a Moroccan professional basketball player. He currently plays for the AS Salé club of the FIBA Africa Club Champions Cup and the Nationale 1, Morocco's first division.

== Biography ==
Born in Derb Sultan (Casablanca) in 1980, Mustapha started playing basketball in 1990 thanks to his father Bouchaïb Khalfi who was a former basketball player and a trainer of Raja Casablanca (basketball section), so Mustapha was formed by Raja CA and he joined the first team in 2001.

Mustapha Khalfi (nicknamed Kachkoucha by fans of the club) won with this team several titles at national level and was selected for the first time to the national team in 2002. An excellent playmaker despite his small size, El Khalfi is considered among the legends of Raja CA Basketball who witnessed the club's golden age.

Since 2005, he participates five times in AfroBasket where he plays 38 matches. Also Mustapha El Khalfi becomes captain of the national team.

El Khalfi becomes the ambassador of the international sportswear brand Peak Sports. In 2015, he signed a partnership contract with Peak Sport Products to associate his image with the brand. Mustapha Khalfi therefore joins Tony Parker and other international basketball stars playing in the American NBA, in France and in Europe who are already ambassadors of the brand. This partnership with a Moroccan player is a first in Morocco. No similar contract has been signed so far with a Moroccan basketball player, Moroccan agency Sport Management said.

The basketball player received in 2016 the prize for the best sportsman in Morocco.

He represented Morocco's national basketball team at the 2017 AfroBasket in Tunisia and Senegal.

At the end of the African basketball championship of 2017, Mustapha Khalfi announces that he will retire internationally, according to the official website of the FIBA Africa. The captain of the Moroccan national basketball team played his last matches in this final championship. "This FIBA AfroBasket is likely to be the last one for half of our national team, including me. So I'll fight and do everything in my power in order to finish on a positive note", Khalfi announced. The 37-year-old guard played basketball for twelve years participating five times to the FIBA Afrobasket, he say : "I feel honored and proud for what I've given to the national team over the years"
