= Jihad Benchlikha =

Moroccan professional basketball player

No. 55 – MAS Fès
- Position: Point guard
- League: Arab Club Basketball Championship; Nationale 1

Personal information
- Born: January 6, 1992 (age 34) Kenitra, Morocco
- Listed height: 6 ft 1 in (1.85 m)

Career information
- Playing career: 2013–present

Career history
- 2013–present: FAR Rabat
Medals
Men's basketball
Representing Morocco
FIBA AfroCan
Gold medal – first place	Angola 2023

Jihad Benchlikha (born January 6, 1992) is a Moroccan professional basketball player. He currently plays for the FAR Rabat club of the Arab Club Basketball Championship and the Nationale 1, Morocco's first division.

Benchlikha represented Morocco's national basketball team at the 2017 AfroBasket in Tunisia and Senegal. He won the 2023 FIBA AfroCan with Morocco, and was named to the All-Tournament Team.
