= Japhie Nguia =

Congolese basketball player

Personal information
- Born: 24 March 1992 (age 34) Brazzaville, Republic of the Congo
- Listed height: 6 ft 2 in (1.88 m)

Career information
- Playing career: 2010–present
- Position: Point guard

Career history
- 2010–2016: Inter Club Brazzaville

Japhie Malève Nguia (born 24 March 1992) is a Congolese professional basketball player. He last played for Inter Club Brazzaville of the FIBA Africa Clubs Champions Cup.

He represented Congo's national basketball team at the 2013 AfroBasket in Abidjan, Ivory Coast.
