= Abderrahim Najah =

Moroccan basketball player

No. 44 – FUS Rabat
- Position: Power forward / center
- League: Division Excellence; BAL

Personal information
- Born: 20 November 1984 (age 41) Casablanca, Morocco
- Listed height: 198 cm (6 ft 6 in)
- Listed weight: 102 kg (225 lb)

Career information
- NBA draft: 2006: undrafted
- Playing career: 2004–present

Career history
- 2004–2009: Raja CA
- 2009–2023: Salé
- 2023–present: FUS Rabat

Career highlights
- FIBA Africa Clubs Champions Cup champion (2017); 7× Moroccan League champion (2010, 2011, 2014–2018)

Abderrahim Najah (born 20 November 1984) is a Moroccan basketball player currently playing for AS Salé of the Division Excellence.

== Professional career ==
Najah started his career in 2004 with Raja CA where he played for five years.

In 2009, he transferred to AS Salé. In 2017, Najah won the FIBA Africa Clubs Champions Cup with Salé. He was on Salé's roster for the 2021 BAL season, the first season of the Basketball Africa League.

Najah transferred to FUS Rabat in the 2023 offseason.

== National team career ==
Najah is a member of the Morocco national basketball team. He participated in both the 2007 and 2009 FIBA Africa Championship.

== BAL career statistics ==
Legend
GP	Games played	GS	Games started	MPG	Minutes per game
FG%	Field goal percentage	3P%	3-point field goal percentage	FT%	Free throw percentage
RPG	Rebounds per game	APG	Assists per game	SPG	Steals per game
BPG	Blocks per game	PPG	Points per game	**Bold**	Career high

Year	Team	GP	GS	MPG	FG%	3P%	FT%	RPG	APG	SPG	BPG	PPG
2021	AS Salé	4	4	22.9	.484	.000	.625	8.0	1.3	.8	1.3	10.0
Career		4	4	22.9	.484	.000	.625	8.0	1.3	.8	1.3	10.0
