= 2021–22 Petro de Luanda basketball season =

Petro de Luanda
2021–22 season
- Chairman: Tomás Faria
- Head coach: José Neto (2nd season)
- Angolan League: Champions
- BAL: Runners-up (lost to US Monastir)
- Taça de Angola: Winners

The 2021–22 season of Petro de Luanda men's basketball team was the 42nd in the existence of the club and the 2nd in the Basketball Africa League (BAL).

Petro won the national treble, winning the Angolan League, Cup and Super Cup competitions. In the BAL, it lost to US Monastir in the 2022 BAL Finals in its first finals appearance.

== Transactions ==
=== Additions ===
No.	Pos.	Nat.	Name	Age	Moving from		Date	Source
12	G	(Cape Verde)	Anderson Correia	23	Coração do Ribatejo	(Cape Verde)	14 March 2022	
2	C	(Angola)	Yanick Moreira	30	Peristeri	(Greece)	14 March 2022	
11	PG	(Central African Republic)	Thierry Darlan	17	NBA Academy Africa	(Senegal)	2 March 2022	
00	G	(United States)	E. C. Matthews	25	Grindavík	(Iceland)	8 May 2022	

=== Subtractions ===
No.	Pos.	Nat.	Name	Age	Moving to		Type	Date	Source
12	G	(United States)	Antwan Scott	29	Al-Ittihad Aleppo	(Syria)	End of contract		
55	C	(United Kingdom)	Ryan Richards	30	Aomori Wat's	(Japan)	End of contract		

== Roster ==
Age as of 1 March 2022.

Note: Flags indicate national team eligibility at FIBA-sanctioned events. Players may hold other non-FIBA nationalities not displayed.

Petro de Luanda roster
Players
Coaches

Pos.	No.	Nat.	Name	Ht.	Wt.	Age
SG	00	(United States)	E. C. Matthews (WI)	1.96 m (6 ft 5 in)	91 kg (201 lb)	26 – 3 October 1995
PG	1	(Angola)	Gerson Domingos	1.78 m (5 ft 10 in)	82 kg (181 lb)	25 – 16 April 1996
C	2	(Angola)	Yanick Moreira	2.11 m (6 ft 11 in)	100 kg (220 lb)	30 – 31 July 1991
SG	4	(Angola)	Olímpio Cipriano	1.94 m (6 ft 4 in)	93 kg (205 lb)	39 – 4 September 1982
PG	5	(Angola)	Childe Dundão	1.67 m (5 ft 6 in)	75 kg (165 lb)	23 – 17 May 1998
SG	6	(Angola)	Carlos Morais	1.92 m (6 ft 4 in)	91 kg (201 lb)	36 – 16 October 1985
SG	10	(Angola)	Gerson Gonçalves	1.93 m (6 ft 4 in)	80 kg (176 lb)	25 – 29 March 1996
PG	11	(Central African Republic)	Thierry Serge Darlan (E)	1.98 m (6 ft 6 in)		18 – 2 February 2004
SG	12	(Cape Verde)	Anderson Correia (AI)	1.95 m (6 ft 5 in)		24 – 30 October 1997
SF	13	(Angola)	Leonel Paulo	1.97 m (6 ft 6 in)	114 kg (251 lb)	35 – 30 April 1986
PF	15	(Angola)	Aboubakar Gakou	2.02 m (6 ft 8 in)		24 – 27 May 1997
C	21	(Angola)	Jone Pedro	2.08 m (6 ft 10 in)	93 kg (205 lb)	39 – 4 September 1982
F	24	(Angola)	Ângelo Gouveia Alexandre	2.00 m (6 ft 7 in)		20 – 9 March 2001
C	41	(Angola)	Vander Joaquim	2.08 m (6 ft 10 in)	108 kg (238 lb)	31 – 15 April 1990

Head coach

- (Brazil) José Neto

Assistant coach(es)

- (Angola) Anibal Moreira
- (Cape Verde) Mery Andrade

Team manager

- (Angola) Artur Barros

Legend

- (C) Team captain
- (E): BAL Elevate player
- (WI): World import
- (AI): African import
- Injured

- Roster
Updated: May 20, 2022

== Competitions ==
=== Unitel Basket ===
==== Regular season ====
Pos.	Club	Pts	GP	W	L	Diff	PF	PA	Qualification or relegation
1	Petro de Luanda	52	26	26	0	1345	1795	3140	Advance to playoffs
2	Interclube	47	26	21	5	658	1786	2444	Advance to playoffs
3	Primeiro de Agosto	46	26	20	6	655	1938	2593	Advance to playoffs
4	ASA	45	25	20	5	180	1923	2103	Advance to playoffs
5	FC Vila Clotilde	40	26	14	12	137	2115	2252	Advance to playoffs
6	Petro de Luanda B	39	26	13	13	-46	2252	2206	Advance to playoffs
7	Interclube B	38	25	13	12	11	2061	2072	Advance to playoffs
8	CPPL	37	26	11	15	-339	2410	2071	Advance to playoffs
9	Jesus Cristo	35	24	11	13	-149	2090	1941	
10	Primeiro de Agosto B	30	24	6	18	-396	2222	1826	
11	Akira Academy	28	24	4	20	-318	2220	1902	
12	Kwanza	28	24	4	20	-474	2084	1610	
13	CAB	24	24	0	24	-1264	2635	1371	

Source: FAB

==== Playoffs ====
Date Time, TV	Opponent	Result	Record	Arena City
Quarterfinals
April 22, 2022	(8) CPPL	W 120-72	1–0	ISPTEC; Luanda
April 23, 2022	at (8) CPPL	W 128–75	2–0	ISPTEC; Luanda
Semifinals
April 29, 2022	(4) Primeiro de Agosto	W 100–66	1–0	Kilamba Arena; Luanda
April 30, 2022	at (4) Primeiro de Agosto	W 95–71	2–0	Kilamba Arena; Luanda
Finals
May 6, 2022	(2) Interclube	W 129–74	1–0	Kilamba Arena; Luanda
May 7, 2022	(2) Interclube	W 102–91	2–0	Kilamba Arena; Luanda
May 10, 2022	at (2) Interclube	W 115–87	3–0	Pavilhão da Cidadela; Luanda

=== Angolan Cup ===
Round	Date	Opponents	H / A	Result	Record
Quarterfinals	30 March 2022	Jesus Cristo	H	W 20–0	1–0
Semifinals	1 April 2022	Petro de Luanda B	H	W 121–62	2–0
Final	3 April 2022	Primeiro de Agosto	H	W 107–88	3–0

=== Angolan Super Cup Vlademiro ===
Gameday	Date	Opponents	H / A	Result
Final	17 December 2021	Primeiro de Agosto	N	W 98–90

=== Basketball Africa League ===
==== Nile Conference ====
10 April 2022	Cape Town Tigers (South Africa)	61–90	(Angola) Petro de Luanda	Cairo
22:00	Scoring by quarter: 18–23, 15–21, 15–21, 13–25
Replay	Pts: Evans Ganapamo 17; Rebs: Nkosinathi Sibanyoni 10; Asts: Myck Kabongo 9 PIR: Nkosinathi Sibanyoni 16	Boxscore	Pts: Carlos Morais 23; Rebs: Jone Pedro 15; Asts: Olímpio Cipriano 5 PIR: Carlos Morais 21	Arena: Hassan Moustafa Sports Hall; Attendance: 100; Referees: Paul Tuomey, Babacar Gueye, Jean Sauveur Ruhamiriza

12 April 2022	Petro de Luanda (Angola)	92–56	(South Sudan) Cobra Sport	Cairo
18:30	Scoring by quarter: 37–13, 16–16, 24–11, 15–16
Replay	Pts: Aboubakar Gakou 17; Rebs: Aboubakar Gakou 8 Asts: Carlos Morais 6 PIR: Aboubakar Gakou 22	Boxscore	Pts: Padiet Wang 15; Rebs: Mayan Kiir, Khaman Maluach 6 Asts: Padiet Wang 3 PIR: Padiet Wang 13	Arena: Hassan Moustafa Sports Hall; Attendance: 250; Referees: Omar Bermudez, Amir Taboubi, Monicca Nassuuna

15 April 2022	Zamalek (Egypt)	85–72	(Angola) Petro de Luanda	Cairo
22:00	Scoring by quarter: 20–23, 25–19, 17–14, 23–16
Replay	Pts: Édgar Sosa 19; Rebs: Anas Mahmoud 11; Asts: D. J. Strawberry 6 PIR: Anas Mahmoud 26	Boxscore	Pts: Childe Dundão 16; Rebs: Jone Pedro, Aboubakar Gakou 8 Asts: Gerson Gonçalves 5 PIR: Childe Dundão, Jone Pedro 14	Arena: Hassan Moustafa Sports Hall; Attendance: 1,132; Referees: Stephanie Barksdale, Mbaye Seye, Amir Taboubi

16 April 2022	Petro de Luanda (Angola)	73–60	(Cameroon) FAP	Cairo
18:30	Scoring by quarter: 18–10, 16–15, 20–15, 19–20
Replay	Pts: Childe Dundão 16; Rebs: Aboubakar Gakou 9 Asts: Gerson Gonçalves 8 PIR: Yanick Moreira 17	Boxscore	Pts: Joel Almeida 13; Rebs: Tyjhai Byers 8 Asts: Cyrille Keumoe 3 PIR: Joel Almeida 12	Arena: Hassan Moustafa Sports Hall; Attendance: 105; Referees: Paul Tuomey, Mbaye Seye, Yann Vezo Davidson

18 April 2022	Petro de Luanda (Angola)	94–64	(Democratic Republic of the Congo) Espoir Fukash	Cairo
18:30	Scoring by quarter: 25–16, 25–15, 22–13, 22–20
Replay	Pts: Yanick Moreira 17; Rebs: Valdelicio Joaquim 6 Asts: Childe Dundão 8 PIR: Yanick Moreira 21	Boxscore	Pts: Narcisse Ambanza 12; Rebs: Narcisse Ambanza 11; Asts: Arsène Mwamba, Emmanuel Isungu 4 PIR: Narcisse Ambanza 17	Arena: Hassan Moustafa Sports Hall; Attendance: 49; Referees: Hortensia Sanchez-Carrizales, Mbaye Seye, Monicca Nassuuna

==== Playoffs ====
===== Quarterfinals =====
21 May 2022	Petro de Luanda (Angola)	102–89	(Morocco) AS Salé	Kigali
14:30	Scoring by quarter: 20–16, 30–19, 30–17, 22–37
	Pts: Morais 27; Rebs: Gonçalves 10; Asts: Dundão 5 PIR: Gonçalves 27	Boxscore	Pts: Harouna 20; Rebs: Dramé 13; Asts: Lahrichi, Stoglin 3 PIR: Dramé 28	Arena: Kigali Arena; Attendance: 1,950; Referees: JD Ralls, Kalume Tonton Banza, Marie Leslie Cherubin

==== Semifinals ====
25 May 2022	Petro de Luanda (Angola)	88–74	(Cameroon) FAP	Kigali
18:00	Scoring by quarter: 22–13, 24–22, 23–12, 19–27
	Pts: Dundão 18; Rebs: Moreira 9 Asts: Domingos 7 PIR: Dundão 23	Boxscore	Pts: Tsangue 13; Rebs: Tametong Toko 7 Asts: Morman 6 PIR: Tametong Toko 13	Arena: Kigali Arena; Referees: Tyler Ricks, Sara Elsharnouby, Mahamadou Diallo

===== Final =====
28 May 2022	Petro de Luanda (Angola)	72–83	(Tunisia) US Monastir	Kigali
18:00 CAT	Scoring by quarter: 17–18, 23–15, 19–24, 13–26
	Pts: Gonçalves 28; Rebs: Moreira 7 Asts: Gonçalves 4 PIR: Gonçalves 27	Boxscore	Pts: Dixon, Lahyani 21; Rebs: Lahyani 10; Asts: Dixon 6 PIR: Lahyani 24	Arena: BK Arena; Attendance: 10,000; Referees: Hortensia Sanchez-Carrizales, Wael Ibrahim Mostafa, Marie Leslie Cherubin

== Individual awards ==
- Angolan Basketball League MVP
  - Gerson Gonçalves
- All-BAL First Team
  - Carlos Morais
- BAL All-Defensive Team
  - Childe Dundão
- BAL Coach of the Year
  - José Neto
- Angolan League Coach of the Year
  - José Neto
