= 2020–21 Petro de Luanda (basketball) season =

Petro de Luanda
2020–21 season
- Chairman: Tomás Faria
- Head coach: José Neto
- Angolan Basketball League: Champions
- Basketball Africa League: Third place

The 2020–21 season of Petro de Luanda men's basketball team was the 41st in the existence of the club and the first in the Basketball Africa League (BAL).

Petro won its 14th title and second consecutive title in the 2020–21 Angolan Basketball League, after the previous season was cancelled due to the COVID-19 pandemic. Interclube was defeated 3–0 in the playoff finals. In the BAL, Petro finished in the third place after defeating Patriots in the third place game.

== Roster ==
Age as of 1 March 2021.

Petro de Luanda roster
Players
Coaches

Pos.	No.	Nat.	Name	Ht.	Age
PG	1	(Angola)	Domingos, Gerson	1.78 m (5 ft 10 in)	24 – 16 April 1996
PG	5	(Angola)	Dundão, Childe	1.67 m (5 ft 6 in)	22 – 17 May 1998
G	12	(United States)	Scott, Antwan (I)	1.85 m (6 ft 1 in)	29 – 28 February 1992
C	21	(Angola)	Pedro, Jone	2.08 m (6 ft 10 in)	38 – 4 September 1982
SG	22	(Angola)	Gonçalves, Gerson	1.93 m (6 ft 4 in)	24 – 29 March 1996
C	23	(Angola)	João, Aldemiro	2.07 m (6 ft 9 in)	27 – 8 July 1993
SF	24	(Angola)	Antonio, José	1.96 m (6 ft 5 in)	30 – 31 July 1990
SG	32	(Angola)	Cipriano, Olímpio	1.94 m (6 ft 4 in)	38 – 4 September 1982
SG	33	(Angola)	Morais, Carlos	1.92 m (6 ft 4 in)	35 – 16 October 1985
SF	34	(Angola)	Paulo, Leonel (C)	1.97 m (6 ft 6 in)	34 – 30 April 1986
C	41	(Angola)	Joaquim, Valdelício	2.08 m (6 ft 10 in)	30 – 15 April 1990
C	54	(United Kingdom)	Richards, Ryan (I)	2.12 m (6 ft 11 in)	38 – 4 September 1982

Head coach

- (Brazil) José Neto

Assistant coach(es)

- (Angola) Anibal Moreira

Team manager

- (Angola) Artur Barros

Legend

- (C) Team captain
- (I) Import player
- Injured

- Roster
Updated: 16 May 2021

=== Additions ===
No.	Pos.	Nat.	Name	Moving from		Date	Source
54	C	(United Kingdom)	Ryan Richards	Surrey Scorchers	(United Kingdom)	May 8, 2021	
12	PG	(United States)	Antwan Scott	ALM Évreux	(France)		
1	PG	(Angola)	Gerson Domingos	Primeiro de Agosto	(Angola)	April 18, 2021	

== BAL ==
=== Group phase ===
Pos	Team	Pld	W	L	PF	PA	PD	Pts	Qualification
1	(Angola) Petro de Luanda	3	3	0	247	208	+39	6	Advance to playoffs
2	(Morocco) AS Salé	3	2	1	253	260	−7	5	Advance to playoffs
3	(Cameroon) FAP	3	1	2	235	218	+17	4	Advance to playoffs
4	(Mali) AS Police	3	0	3	210	259	−49	3	

Source: BAL

2021 game log
Total: 3–0
Group Phase

Game	Date	Team	Score	High points	High rebounds	High assists	Location Attendance	Series
1	18 May	(Mali); AS Police	W 84–66	Jone Pedro (16)	Jone Pedro (11)	Childe Dundao (4)	Kigali Arena; N/A	1–0
2	20 May	(Cameroon); FAP	W 64–66	Antwan Scott (23)	Pedro, Morais (10)	Three players (3)	Kigali Arena; N/A	2–0
3	23 May	(Morocco); AS Salé	W 97–78	Ryan Richards (19)	Jone Pedro (10)	Antwan Scott (7)	Kigali Arena; N/A	3–0

=== Playoffs ===
2021 playoff game log
Total: 1–2
Playoffs

Game	Date	Team	Score	High points	High rebounds	High assists	Location Attendance	Record
Quarterfinals	26 May	(Morocco) (6) AS Salé	W 79–72	Gerson Gonçalves (19)	Gerson Gonçalves (10)	Gerson Gonçalves (6)	Kigali Arena; 543	N/A
Semifinals	29 May	(Egypt) (2) Zamalek	L 89–71	Carlos Morais (18)	Jone Pedro (9)	Dundao, Gonçalves (3)	Kigali Arena; 704	N/A
Third place	30 May	(Rwanda) (4) Patriots BBC	W 97–68	Valdelício Joaquim (21)	Jone Pedro (9)	Antwan Scott (7)	Kigali Arena; 747	N/A

== Player statistics ==
Legend
GP	Games played	GS	Games started	MPG	Minutes per game
FG%	Field-goal percentage	3P%	3-point field-goal percentage	FT%	Free-throw percentage
RPG	Rebounds per game	APG	Assists per game	SPG	Steals per game
BPG	Blocks per game	PPG	Points per game

Petro de Luanda statistics
Player	GP	MPG	FG%	3FG%	FT%	RPG	APG	SPG	BPG	PPG
Carlos Morais	6	26.0	.344	.341	.700	3.8	1.5	1.3	0.0	11.5
Jone Pedro	6	25.1	.636	.000	.588	10.5	1.0	1.2	1.5	11.0
Antwan Scott	6	23.7	.413	.321	.727	1.8	3.5	1.8	0.2	9.2
Valdelício Joaquim	6	18.8	.556	.579	.800	3.7	0.8	0.5	0.3	9.2
Gerson Gonçalves	6	25.0	.457	.200	.700	5.5	4.0	1.2	0.5	8.8
Ryan Richards	6	17.4	.438	.500	.714	4.0	0.8	1.2	0.0	8.5
Childe Dundão	6	16.7	.341	.389	.800	3.2	2.2	1.5	0.0	7.2
Olímpio Cipriano	6	15.9	.359	.324	.750	2.3	1.0	0.3	0.0	7.0
Leonel Paulo	6	15.3	.447	.182	.429	2.5	1.5	0.5	0.2	6.5
Gerson Domingos	6	11.4	.333	.333	1.000	1.3	1.2	0.3	0.0	3.0
Aldemiro João	3	2.2	.500	.000	.333	0.0	0.0	0.0	0.0	1.0
José Antonio	4	5.5	.000	.000	.000	0.8	0.5	0.0	0.2	0.0
