= 2024–25 Angolan Basketball League =

- League: Angolan Basketball League
- Sport: Basketball
- Duration: 6 December 2024 – 30 May 2025
- Number of teams: 12

Regular season
- Season MVP: Aboubakar Gakou (Petro de Luanda)

Finals
- Champions: Petro de Luanda
- Runners-up: Primeiro de Agosto

Seasons
- ← 2023–24 2025–26 →

The 2024–25 Angolan Basketball League (known as Unitel Basket for sponsorship reasons) is the 47th season of the Angolan Basketball League, the highest level men's basketball league in Angola. The season began on 6 December 2024 and ended on 30 May 2025 with the last game of the playoff finals.

Petro de Luanda were the defending champions, and successfully defended its title by defeating Primeiro de Agosto in the finals in five games. It was the eighteenth title of Petro, and the sixth consecutive championship. It was the second team to win six straight titles, following Primeiro de Agosto's streak between 2000 and 2005. As winners, Petro qualified directly for the 2026 BAL season.

== Teams ==
Sporting de Luanda, former champions of the league, returned in the 2024–25 season.

Club	Location
Akiras Academy	Uíge
ASA	Luanda
Clube Amigos de Benguela	Benguela
CPPL	Lobito
Jesus Cristo	Viana
Interclube	Luanda (Rocha Pinto)
Interclube B	Luanda (Rocha Pinto)
Petro de Luanda	Luanda (Eixo Viário)
Petro de Luanda B	Luanda (Eixo Viário)
Primeiro de Agosto	Luanda
Sporting de Luanda	Luanda
Vila Clotilde	Luanda (Maculusso)
Desportivo Kwanza	Luanda

== Group phase ==
[data missing]

Pos	Team	Pld	W	L	PF	PA	PD	Pts	Qualification
1	Petro de Luanda	13	13	0	1399	873	+526	26	Advance to Group A
2	CPPL	13	11	2	1216	985	+231	24	Advance to Group A
3	Interclube	12	10	2	1244	964	+280	22	Advance to Group A
4	Primeiro de Agosto	13	9	4	1236	1018	+218	22	Advance to Group A
5	FC Vila Clotilde	13	7	6	1120	1021	+99	20	Advance to Group A
6	Petro de Luanda B	13	7	6	1126	1106	+20	20	Advance to Group A
7	Sporting Clube de Luanda	13	6	7	974	1130	−156	19	Advance to Group B
8	ASA	13	4	9	977	1107	−130	17	Advance to Group B
9	Interclube B	13	4	9	995	1072	−77	17	Advance to Group B
10	FC Vila Clotilde B	13	3	10	859	1140	−281	16	Advance to Group B
11	Clube Amigos de Benguela	13	3	10	983	1336	−353	16	Advance to Group B
12	CD Kwanza	13	2	11	1068	1399	−331	15	Advance to Group B
13	Akiras Academy	12	0	12	747	1083	−336	12	Advance to Group B

Source: FAB

== Second phase ==
=== Group A ===
Pos	Team	Pld	W	L	PF	PA	PD	Pts	Qualification
1	Primeiro de Agosto	7	7	0	605	538	+67	14	Advance to playoffs
2	Petro de Luanda	7	6	1	676	508	+168	13	Advance to playoffs
3	Interclube	7	4	3	602	603	−1	11	Advance to playoffs
4	CPPL	7	2	5	584	639	−55	9	Advance to playoffs
5	Petro de Luanda B	7	1	6	570	680	−110	8	Advance to playoffs
6	Sporting Clube de Luanda	7	1	6	540	609	−69	8	Advance to playoffs

Source: FBA

=== Group B ===
Pos	Team	Pld	W	L	PF	PA	PD	Pts	Qualification
1	FC Vila Clotilde	12	11	1	1165	903	+262	23	Advance to playoffs
2	Interclube B	12	8	4	966	892	+74	20	Advance to playoffs
3	FC Vila Clotilde B	12	8	4	1054	1017	+37	20	
4	ASA	11	6	5	951	888	+63	17	
5	Sporting Clube de Luanda B	12	5	7	1029	1047	−18	17	
6	Akiras Academy	11	3	8	812	924	−112	14	
7	Clube Amigos de Benguela	9	3	6	779	833	−54	12	
8	CD Kwanza	11	1	10	921	1173	−252	12	

Source: FBA

== Playoffs ==
Quarterfinals
1	Interclube	89	95
8	Petro de Luanda B	83	94
4	1º de Agosto	59	87	94
5	Vila Clotilde	72	79	91
3	Sporting de Luanda	77	84
6	CPPL	72	70
2	Petro de Luanda	111	94
7	Interclube B	72	39

Semifinals
Interclube	77	81
1º de Agosto	81	93
Sporting de Luanda	84	91	72
Petro de Luanda	89	97	95

Final
1º de Agosto	78	81	86	69	75
Petro de Luanda	89	79	95	90	105

== Awards ==
- MVP: Aboubakar Gakou, Petro de Luanda
- All-League Team ("5 Ideal"):
  - Childe Dundão, Petro de Luanda
  - Aboubakar Gakou, Petro de Luanda
  - Tiago Fernandes, Primeiro de Agosto
  - Glofate Buiamba, Petro de Luanda
  - Yanick Moreira, Petro de Luanda

== Statistical leaders ==
As of the end of the season.

=== Averages ===
Category	Player	Team(s)	Statistic
Points per game	Danilson Jacinto	CD Kwanza	20.4
Rebounds per game	Josué Bartolomeu	Sporting de Luanda B	11.1
Assists per game	Not listed		
Steals per game	Helder Fernandes	Sporting de Luanda	2.5
2FG%	Yanick Moreira	Petro de Luanda	63.9%
FT%	Raimer Santana	Interclube	82.2%
3FG%	Aboubakar Gakou	Petro de Luanda	43.5%

=== Totals ===
Category	Player	Team(s)	Statistic
Efficiency	Aboubakar Gakou	Petro de Luanda	608
Points	Luis Joé	Interclube B	22.2
Rebounds	Eliseu João	Primeiro de Agosto	278
Assists	Childe Dundão	Petro de Luanda	179
Steals	Childe Dundão	Petro de Luanda	79
2-point field goals made	Luis Joé	Interclube B	158
Free throws made	Pascoal Conde	CAB	166
3-point field goals made	Adão Antonio	FC Vila Clotilde	95
