= 2022 BAL finals =

Final of the 2022 edition of the Basketball Africa League

2022 BAL Finals
- Official promotion image for the finals
- Event: 2022 BAL season
| Petro de Luanda | US Monastir |
| (Angola) | (Tunisia) |
| (6–1) | (6–1) |
|---|---|
| 72 | 83 |
| Head coach: José Neto | Head coach: Miodrag Perišić |
| | 1 | 2 | 3 | 4 | Total |
|---|---|---|---|---|---|
| Petro de Luanda | 17 | 23 | 19 | 13 | 72 |
| US Monastir | 18 | 15 | 24 | 26 | 83 |
- Date: 28 May 2022
- Venue: BK Arena, Kigali, Rwanda
- MVP: Michael Dixon, US Monastir
- Favorite: US Monastir (1.38 decimal odds)
- Referees: Hortensia Sanchez-Carrizales; Wael Ibrahim Mostafa; Marie Leslie Cherubin
- Attendance: 10,000

The 2022 BAL Finals was the championship game of the 2022 BAL season, the second season of the Basketball Africa League (BAL). The final was played in the BK Arena in Kigali on 28 May 2022, between Angolan club Petro de Luanda and Tunisian club US Monastir.

US Monastir won the game after pulling away in the fourth quarter, winning its first BAL and its first African continental title. The game was attended by a sold-out crowd of 10,000.

== Teams ==
In the following table, finals in the FIBA Africa Clubs Champions Cup are in small text.

| Team | Previous final appearances (bold indicates winners) |
|---|---|
| (Tunisia) US Monastir | 1 (2021) |
| (Angola) Petro de Luanda | None; 8 (1994, 1999, 2000, **2006**, 2007, 2009, 2012, **2015**) |

== Venue ==
On 9 December 2021, The BK Arena, then named the "Kigali Arena", was announced as the venue of the 2022 BAL Playoffs. This was the second consecutive final that was held at the arena.

| Kigali | 2022 BAL finals (Africa) |
| BK Arena | 2022 BAL finals (Africa) |
| Capacity: 10,000 | 2022 BAL finals (Africa) |

== Background ==
=== Petro de Luanda ===
Petro de Luanda qualified as the champions of the 2020–21 season and brought back Brazilian coach José Neto for a second season. The core of its roster remained intact, with Anderson Correia and Yanick Moreira being signed as reinforcements on 15 March 2022.

Petro had its most successful season in history, as the team won the 2021–22 Angolan Basketball League with an unbeaten record of 33–0. On 11 May 2022, it captured its 15th national title after sweeping Interclube in the national finals. As the team also won the Angolan Cup and the Angolan Supercup, it captured its first national treble.

In the 2022 BAL Nile Conference, Petro ended in second place after losing only to Zamalek. On 8 May, American guard E. C. Matthews was added to the roster ahead of the playoffs. After defeating AS Salé in a re-match of last season's quarterfinal, Petro defeated FAP to reach its first-ever BAL final and its ninth African continental final.

=== US Monastir ===
US Monastir qualified for its second straight BAL season after winning the 2020–21 Championnat National A title. In the offseason, the club lost its All-BAL star players Omar Abada and Makrem Ben Romdhane in the offseason as they signed in Saudi Arabia and Portugal respectively. The roster was strengthened with Solo Diabate and Michael Dixon, however, while Ater Majok re-signed.

In its domestic competitions, Monastir had another dominant season as it captured its fourth consecutive national title on 11 May 2022, having defeated Ezzahra Sports in the finals. Three days later, on 14 May, Monastir also won the Tunisian Cup to complete the double.

In the 2022 BAL Sahara Conference, Monastir finished second after a surprising loss against Rwandan club REG. Ahead of the playoffs, the team was strengthened with American guard Julius Coles Jr. In the quarterfinals, the team blew out Cape Town Tigers by a season-high 39 points difference. In the semifinals, the team defeated Zamalek to take revenge for the previous season's final loss.

== Road to the finals ==
| (Angola) Petro de Luanda | | Round | (Tunisia) US Monastir | |
|---|---|---|---|---|
| Opponent | Result | Group phase | Opponent | Result |
| (South Africa) Cape Town Tigers | 90–61 | Round 1 | (Mozambique) Ferroviário da Beira | 77–71 |
| (South Sudan) Cobra Sport | 92–56 | Round 2 | (Guinea) SLAC | 76–55 |
| (Egypt) Zamalek | 72–85 | Round 3 | (Morocco) AS Salé | 96–90 |
| (Cameroon) FAP | 73–60 | Round 4 | (Senegal) DUC | 74–62 |
| (Democratic Republic of the Congo) Espoir Fukash | 94–64 | Round 5 | (Rwanda) REG | 74–77 |
| **Nile Conference second place**: Pos / Team / Pld / PCT; 1 / (Egypt) Zamalek (H) / 5 / 1.000; **2** / (Angola) Petro de Luanda / **5** / .800; 3 / (South Africa) Cape Town Tigers / 5 / .400; 4 / (Cameroon) FAP / 5 / .400; 5 / (South Sudan) Cobra Sport / 5 / .200; 6 / (Democratic Republic of the Congo) Espoir Fukash / 5 / .200; Source: BAL, Afrobasket (H) Hosts | | Regular season | **Sahara Conference second place**: Pos / Team / Pld / PCT; 1 / (Rwanda) REG / 5 / .800; **2** / (Tunisia) US Monastir / **5** / .800; 3 / (Morocco) AS Salé / 5 / .600; 4 / (Guinea) SLAC / 5 / .400; 5 / (Mozambique) Ferroviário da Beira / 5 / .200; 6 / (Senegal) DUC (H) / 5 / .200; Source: BAL, Afrobasket (H) Hosts | |
| Opponent | Result | Playoffs | Opponent | Result |
| (Morocco) AS Salé | 102–89 | Quarterfinals | (South Africa) Cape Town Tigers | 106–67 |
| (Cameroon) FAP | 88–74 | Semifinals | (Egypt) Zamalek | 88–81 |

== Game ==
US Monastir won the first quarter 17–18. In the second quarter, Petro de Luanda made a 8–0 run that included three-point field goals by Gerson Gonçalves and Carlos Morais, to end the first half with a 40–33 lead. Monastir shot 0-8 from behind the three-point line in the first half, and the Tunisian bench was outscored 17–2 by the Angolans. Following free-throw misses and turnovers by Petro in the third quarter, Monastir only trailed 57–59. Michael Dixon scored a three-pointer to put Monastir up 60–59, their first lead in the second half. Petro big men Jone Pedro and Yanick Moreira were both fouled out with 8 minutes and 1 minutes to go, respectively. With three minutes to play, Carlos Morais made an unsportsmanlike foul on which Monastir capitalise to take a 72–67 lead. The game was sealed with 30 seconds to go after Radhouane Slimane picked up an offensive rebound after a Julius Coles Jr. miss and scored the basket to put Monastir up 78–72. Following a Petro de Luanda time-out, Monastir forward Firas Lahyani stole the ball which gave Petro no chance to come back. Michael Dixon shot 7-of-10 from the field and had 21 points and 6 assists in the game, and following his superb performance, he was named the BAL Most Valuable Player, following Walter Hodge as the second-ever winner of the award. Monastir center Ater Majok, who scored 14 points in the game, was named the BAL Defensive Player of the Year. Gerson Gonçalves scored 28 points for the losing Angolan side, followed by Yanick Moreira's 18 points off the bench.

| 28 May 2022 | Petro de Luanda (Angola) | 72–**83** | (Tunisia) **US Monastir** | Kigali |
| 18:00 CAT | Scoring by quarter: 17–18, 23–15, 19–24, 13–26 |
| | Pts: Gonçalves 28; Rebs: Moreira 7 Asts: Gonçalves 4 PIR: Gonçalves 27 | Boxscore | Pts: Dixon, Lahyani 21; Rebs: Lahyani 10; Asts: Dixon 6 PIR: Lahyani 24 | Arena: BK Arena; Attendance: 10,000; Referees: Hortensia Sanchez-Carrizales, Wael Ibrahim Mostafa, Marie Leslie Cherubin |

| Starters: | | | Pts | Reb | Ast |
|---|---|---|---|---|---|
| PG | 5 | (Angola) Childe Dundão | 1 | 3 | 2 |
| SG | 10 | (Angola) Gerson Gonçalves | 28 | 5 | 4 |
| SF | 6 | (Angola) Carlos Morais | 12 | 4 | 2 |
| PF | 15 | (Angola) Aboubakar Gakou | 3 | 4 | 3 |
| C | 21 | (Angola) Jone Pedro | 2 | 3 | 0 |
| Reserves: | | | | | |
| G | 00 | (United States) E. C. Matthews | 0 | 1 | 0 |
| G | 1 | (Angola) Gerson Domingos | 3 | 2 | 0 |
| C | 2 | (Angola) Yanick Moreira | 18 | 7 | 0 |
| F | 4 | (Angola) Olimpio Cipriano | 3 | 3 | 1 |
| G | 11 | (Central African Republic) Thierry Serge Darlan | DNP | | |
| G | 12 | (Cape Verde) Anderson Correia | DNP | | |
| F | 24 | (Angola) Ángelo Gouveia Alexandre | DNP | | |
Head coach:
(Brazilian Basketball Confederation) José Neto

| **Petro** | **Monastir** |

| Petro | Statistics | Monastir |
|---|---|---|
| 13/24 (54%) | 2-pt field goals | 21/35 (60%) |
| 10/28 (35%) | 3-pt field goals | 5/24 (20%) |
| 16/28 (57%) | Free throws | 26/34 (76%) |
| 8 | Offensive rebounds | 8 |
| 30 | Defensive rebounds | 7 |
| 38 | Total rebounds | 26 |
| 12 | Assists | 20 |
| 28 | Turnovers | 18 |
| 4 | Steals | 11 |
| 3 | Blocks | 5 |
| 26 | Fouls | 24 |

2022 BAL champions

**US Monastir**
1st BAL title; 1st continental title

| Starters: | | | Pts | Reb | Ast |
|---|---|---|---|---|---|
| PG | 00 | (Georgia (country)) Michael Dixon | 21 | 0 | 6 |
| SG | 5 | (United States) Julius Coles Jr. | 6 | 1 | 4 |
| SF | 45 | (Tunisia) Radhouane Slimane | 4 | 8 | 1 |
| PF | 23 | (Tunisia) Firas Lahyani | 21 | 10 | 2 |
| C | 13 | (South Sudan) Ater Majok | 14 | 4 | 1 |
| Reserves: | | | | | |
| F | 1 | (Tunisia) Oussama Marnaoui | 9 | 1 | 1 |
| G | 2 | (Tunisia) Neji Jaziri | DNP | | |
| G | 10 | (Ivory Coast) Solo Diabate | 4 | 3 | 3 |
| G | 11 | (Tunisia) Houssem Mahemli | 0 | 0 | 1 |
| G/F | 12 | (Cameroon) Charles Loic Onana Awana | DNP | | |
| F | 15 | (Tunisia) Wassef Methnani | DNP | | |
| C | 21 | (Tunisia) Mokhtar Ghyaza | 4 | 2 | 1 |
| F | 24 | (Tunisia) Mohamed Abbassi | DNP | | |
Head coach:
(Basketball Federation of Serbia) Miodrag Perišić

== Aftermath ==
To honour their championship, US Monastir was received at the Carthage Palace by Tunisian President Kais Saied. The team was also congratulated on Twitter by Barack Obama, former President of the United States and an investor in the BAL.
