= Aboubakar Gakou =

Angolan basketball player (born 1997)

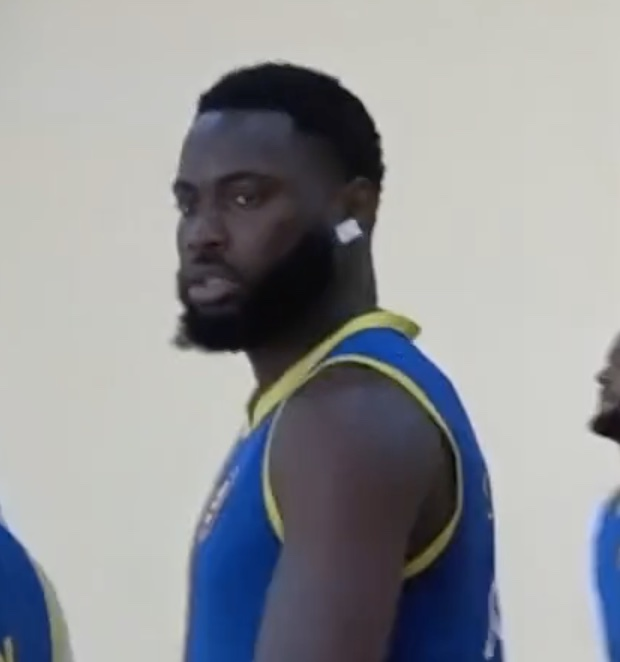
- Gakou in 2022

No. 14 – Petro de Luanda
- Position: Power forward
- League: BAL; Angolan Basketball League

Personal information
- Born: 27 May 1997 (age 29) Angola
- Listed height: 2.01 m (6 ft 7 in)

Career information
- Playing career: 2015–present

Career history
- 2015–present: Petro de Luanda

Career highlights
- BAL champion (2024); BAL All-Defensive Team (2022); 6× Angolan League champion (2019, 2021–2025); 3× Angolan League MVP (2021, 2023, 2025); Angolan League Regular Season MVP (2024); 3× Angolan Cup winner (2022, 2023, 2025); 3× Angolan Supercup winner (2021, 2022, 2024)
Medals
Men's basketball
Representing Angola
AfroBasket
Gold medal – first place	2025 Angola

Aboubakar Pedro Gakou (born 27 May 1997) is an Angolan basketball player who plays for Petro de Luanda and the Angola national team. Standing at 2.01 m (6 ft 7 in), he plays as power forward.

Gakou started his career with Petro in 2015 and has won four national championships with the team since, while being a three-time MVP winner as well. He won his first BAL championship in 2024.

== Professional career ==
Gakou started playing basketball only at age 17. A year later, in 2015, he was a prospect on the roster of Petro de Luanda. He won his first Angolan championship in 2019. Gakou was named the league's Most Valuable Player of the 2020–21 season after winning his second championship with the team. He was forced to miss the 2021 BAL season after he tested positive for COVID-19, making it impossible for him to join the bubble.

In the 2021–22 season, Gakou helped Petro win the national treble. He also helped his team reach the 2022 BAL Finals, where the team lost to US Monastir. On 27 May Gakou was named to the BAL All-Defensive Team.

Gakou won his fourth consecutive Angolan League title in 2023, and was named league MVP for a second time.

On 12 May 2024 Gakou was named the Angolan Basketball League Regular Season MVP, the same day after Petro won a fifth straight title. On 1 June he won his first BAL championship.

In the 2024–25 season, Petro won its sixth straight national championship, tying an Angolan League record by Primeiro de Agosto. On May 30, 2025, he won his third MVP award.

== National team career ==
Internationally, Gakou has played for the Angola national basketball team. He was on the roster for AfroBasket 2021.

== Awards and accomplishments ==
=== Club ===
Petro de Luanda

- BAL champion: (2024)
- 6× Angolan Basketball League: (2019, 2021, 2022, 2023, 2024, 2025)
- 3× Taça de Angola: (2022, 2023, 2025)
- 3× Supertaça de Angola: (2021, 2022, 2024)

=== Individual ===
- BAL All-Defensive Team: (2022)
- 3× Angolan League MVP: (2021, 2023, 2025)
- Angolan Basketball League Regular Season MVP: (2024)
- Angolan Basketball League Best Rebounder: (2024)

== BAL career statistics ==
Legend
GP	Games played	GS	Games started	MPG	Minutes per game
FG%	Field goal percentage	3P%	3-point field goal percentage	FT%	Free throw percentage
RPG	Rebounds per game	APG	Assists per game	SPG	Steals per game
BPG	Blocks per game	PPG	Points per game	**Bold**	Career high
†	Won an BAL championship

Year	Team	GP	GS	MPG	FG%	3P%	FT%	RPG	APG	SPG	BPG	PPG
2022	Petro de Luanda	8	8	20.6	**.446**	.344	**.923**	5.3	**0.8**	0.5	0.1	**9.1**
2023	Petro de Luanda	8	8	18.8	.355	.344	.727	4.0	**0.8**	0.5	0.1	6.9
2024†	Petro de Luanda	8	6	**22.7**	.400	.222	.739	**5.8**	0.5	0.5	**0.3**	8.4
