= 2022–23 Angolan Basketball League =

45th season of the Angolan Basketball League

- League: Angolan Basketball League
- Sport: Basketball
- Duration: 21 October 2022 – 19 April 2023
- Number of teams: 13

Regular season
- Top seed: Petro de Luanda
- Season MVP: Miguel Maconda (Jesus Cristo)
- Top scorer: Josué Bartolomeu (CAB)

Finals
- Champions: Petro de Luanda (16th title)
- Runners-up: Primeiro de Agosto
- Finals MVP: Aboubakar Gakou (Petro de Luanda)

Seasons
- ← 2021–22 2023–24 →

The 2022–23 Angolan Basketball League, for sponsorship reasons known as the 2022–23 Unitel Basket, was the 45th season of the Angolan Basketball League, the highest premier basketball league in Angola. The season consisted of thirteen teams and began on 21 October 2022 and ended on 19 April 2023 with the conclusion of the finals.

The format of the previous season stayed mostly the same. The finals were announced to be changed to a best-of-seven series; however, eventually a best-of-five system was still used.

Petro de Luanda won its 16th national title after defeating Primeiro de Agosto in the play-off finals.

== Regular season ==
Advance to playoffs

Pos	2022–23 Angolan Basketball League regular season							
Pos	Team	Pld	W	L	PF	PA	PD	Points
1	Petro de Luanda (C)	24	23	1	2621	1710	+911	47
2	Primeiro de Agosto	24	22	2	2570	1874	+696	46
3	Interclube	24	20	4	2380	1957	423	44
4	Primeiro de Agosto B	25	16	9	2382	2151	231	41
5	Vila Clotilde	24	13	11	2175	2164	+11	37
6	Petro de Luanda B	24	11	13	2035	2092	–57	35
7	CPPL	23	10	13	1872	1997	–125	33
8	Jesus Cristo	24	10	14	1983	2141	–158	34
9	Akiras Academy	24	9	15	1906	2166	–260	33
10	Interclube B	24	9	15	1839	1928	–89	33
11	ASA	23	9	14	1945	2128	–183	32
12	Depsortivo Kwanza	24	3	21	1960	2557	–597	27
13	Clube Amigos de Benguela	25	1	24	1711	2514	–803	26

(C): Champions; Source: FAB

== Playoffs ==
The playoffs began on 27 March 2023.

Quarterfinals
1	Petro de Luanda	111	104	2
8	Jesus Cristo	84	79	0
4	Primeiro de Agosto B	100	75	84	2
5	Vila Clotilde	87	70	96	1
2	Primeiro de Agosto	99	93	2
7	Petro de Luanda B	66	57	0
3	Interclube	112	95	2
6	CPPL	97	91	0

Semifinals
1	Petro de Luanda	129	102	97	3
5	Vila Clotilde	74	66	61	0
2	Primeiro de Agosto	108	102	103	78	3
3	Interclube	102	78	105	74	1

Finals
1	Petro de Luanda	71	90	97	91	3
2	Primeiro de Agosto	76	71	74	78	1

== Statistics and awards ==
=== Individual awards ===
The individual awards winners were announced on 19 April, following the last game of the finals.

Category	Player	Team(s)
Most Valuable Player	Aboubakar Gakou	Petro de Luanda
Regular Season MVP	Miguel Maconda	Jesus Cristo
Best Coach	José Neto	Petro de Luanda
Fair Play Athlete	Aldemiro João	Petro de Luanda
Best Referee	Cláudio Eiuba	–
Best Three-Point Shooter	Carlos Morais	Petro de Luanda
Best Scorer	Milton Valente	Priemiro de Agosto

=== Statistical leaders ===
The statistical leaders of the 2022–23 season were (excluding playoff games):

Category	Player	Team(s)	Statistic
Points per game	Josué Bartolomeu	Clube Amigos de Benguela	19.0
Rebounds per game	Keven Albino	Interclube B	13.8
Total assists	Tiago Fernandes	Primeiro de Agosto B	161
Steals per game	Childe Dundão	Petro de Luanda	3.0
2FG%	Milton Valente	Priemiro de Agosto	67.3%
FT%	Miguel Maconda	Jesus Cristo	79.6%
3FG%	Paulo Barros	Interclube	44.4%
