= Anderson Correia =

Anderson Correia may refer to:

- Anderson Correia (footballer) (born 1991), Cypriot footballer
- Anderson Correia (basketball) (born 1997), Cape Verdean basketball player
