= Gerson Gonçalves =

Angolan basketball player (born 1996)

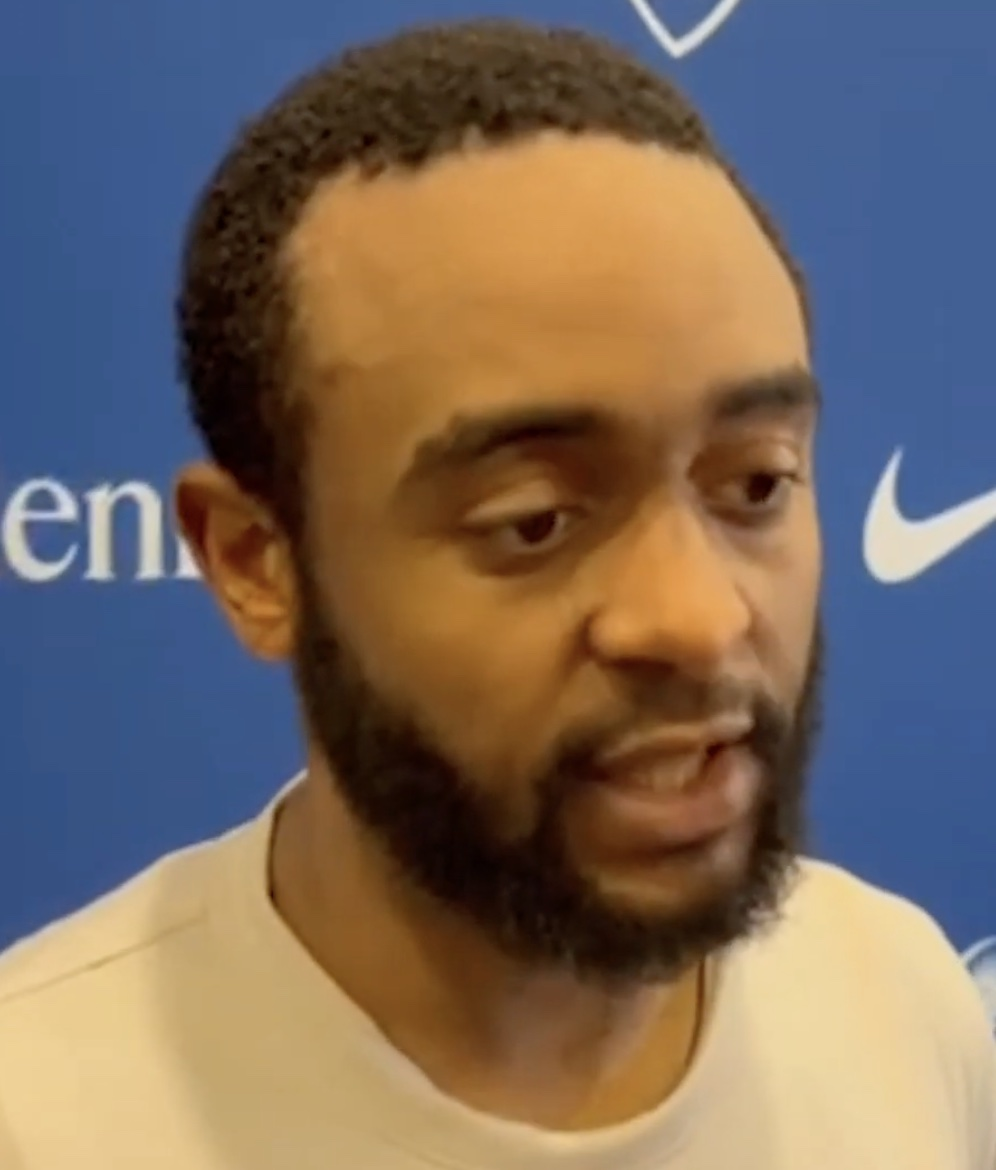
- Gonçalves after the 2022 BAL Finals

Aix Maurienne Savoie Basket
- Position: Shooting guard
- League: LNB Pro B

Personal information
- Born: 29 March 1996 (age 30) Luanda, Angola
- Listed height: 1.94 m (6 ft 4 in)
- Listed weight: 80 kg (176 lb)

Career information
- Playing career: 2015–present

Career history
- 2015–2024: Petro de Luanda
- 2024–present: AMSB

Career highlights
- FIBA Africa Champions Cup champion (2015); BAL champion (2024); 5× Angolan League champion (2019, 2021–2024); 2× Angolan League MVP (2019, 2022); 2× Angolan Cup winner (2022, 2023); 3× Angolan Supercup winner (2021–2023)
Medals
Men's basketball
Representing Angola
AfroBasket
Gold medal – first place	2025 Angola
African Games
Silver medal – second place	2015 Brazzaville

Gerson Henriques Gonçalves (born 29 March 1996), also known as Lukeny, is an Angolan basketball player for AMSB of the French LNB Pro B. He played nine seasons for Petro de Luanda of the Angolan Basketball League, where he was a two-time league MVP winner (2019 and 2022) and a BAL champion in 2024.

== Professional career ==
=== Angola ===
Gonçalves played for Petro de Luanda in the 2015 FIBA Africa Clubs Champions Cup.

He participated in the 2018–19 Africa Basketball League where he averaged 6.6 points, 2.8 rebounds and 3 assists per game.

Gonçalves was named the MVP of the Angolan League in 2019, after winning his second title with Petro. He repeated as most valuable player three years later, in 2022, after another national championship.

He won his first BAL championship on June 1, 2024, after Petro defeated Al Ahly Ly in the final. He contributed 16 points in the final against Al Ahly Ly.

=== France ===
On 16 July 2024, Gonçalves signed a one-year contract with Aix Maurienne Savoie Basket of the French LNB Pro B, the national second-level league.

== National team career ==
Gonçalves played for Angola's junior teams and helped them win the 2015 African Games. At the 2014 FIBA Africa Under-18 Championship, he averaged 16.6 points on his way to helping Angola finish in 4th place.

represented the Angola national basketball team at the 2019 FIBA Basketball World Cup in China, where he averaged 3.2 points, 1 rebound and 1.5 assists per game.

== BAL career statistics ==
Legend
GP	Games played	GS	Games started	MPG	Minutes per game
FG%	Field goal percentage	3P%	3-point field goal percentage	FT%	Free throw percentage
RPG	Rebounds per game	APG	Assists per game	SPG	Steals per game
BPG	Blocks per game	PPG	Points per game	**Bold**	Career high

Year	Team	GP	GS	MPG	FG%	3P%	FT%	RPG	APG	SPG	BPG	PPG
2021	Petro de Luanda	6	6	25.0	.457	.200	.700	**5.5**	4.0	1.2	**.5**	8.8
2022	Petro de Luanda	8	8	**25.4**	**.521**	**.372**	.700	3.4	**4.1**	.9	.1	**12.1**
2023	Petro de Luanda	8	8	23.4	.510	.360	**.750**	3.4	3.5	b	.0	9.1

== Awards and accomplishments ==
=== Club ===
- 4× Angolan League: (2019, 2021, 2022, 2023)
- 2× Taça de Angola: (2022, 2023)
- 2× Supertaça de Angola: (2021, 2022)

=== Individual ===
- 2× Angolan League MVP: (2019, 2022)
- Angolan Basketball League Regular Season MVP: (2018)
