= Angolan Basketball League Regular Season MVP =

Annual basketball award

- Sport: Basketball
- League: Angolan Basketball League
- Awarded for: Best performing player in a regular season of the Angolan Basketball League
- Country: Angola

History
- Most wins: Jilson Bango (2 awards)
- Most recent: Aboubakar Gakou, Petro de Luanda (2023–24)

The Angolan Basketball League Regular Season MVP Award, for sponsorships reasons named the Unitel Basket Regular Season MVP, is an annual basketball award given out to the most valuable player of a given Angolan Basketball League regular season.

It is not to be confused with the Angolan Basketball League MVP Award, which is given to the best player of the entire season which usually is a player on the champions.

== Winners ==
^	Denotes player who is still active in the Angolan Basketball League
Player (X)	Denotes the number of times the player has been awarded the award

Season	Player	Position	Team	Ref.
2014–15	Leonel Paulo^	Forward	Petro de Luanda	
2017–18	Gerson Gonçalves	Guard	Petro de Luanda	
2018–19	Joseney Joaquim^	Forward	Universidade Lusíada	
2020–21	Jilson Bango	Center	Primeiro de Agosto	
2021–22	Jilson Bango (2)	Center	Primeiro de Agosto	
2022–23	Miguel Maconda	Forward	Jesus Cristo	
2023–24	Aboubakar Gakou	Forward	Petro de Luanda	

== Awards by player ==
Team	Winners
Jilson Bango	2
