= Gerson Domingos =

Angolan basketball player (born 1996)

No. 1 – Petro de Luanda
- Position: Point guard
- League: Angolan Basketball League; Basketball Africa League

Personal information
- Born: 16 April 1996 (age 30)
- Listed height: 5 ft 10 in (1.78 m)
- Listed weight: 180 lb (82 kg)

Career information
- NBA draft: 2018: undrafted

Career history
- –2019: Interclube
- 2019–2021: Primeiro de Agosto
- 2021–present: Petro de Luanda

Career highlights
- BAL champion (2024); 2× Angolan League champion (2022, 2023); 2× Angolan Cup winner (2022, 2023); 3× Angolan Supercup winner (2021–2023); Angolan League assists leader (2016); FIBA Africa Under-18 Championship MVP (2014)

Gerson Da Silva Domingos (born 16 April 1996) is an Angolan basketball player who plays for Petro de Luanda of the Basketball Africa League (BAL). Standing at 178 cm (5 ft 10 in), he plays as point guard.

== Professional career ==
Domingos started playing for the G.D. Interclube in 2017. In 2021, Domingos signed with Petro de Luanda. He won the 2024 BAL championship with Petro, as the starting point guard.

== National team career ==
Domingos played with Angolan under-18 team at the 2014 FIBA Africa Under-18 Championship in Madagascar. He was named the MVP of the tournament, after averaging 18.9 points and 2.6 assists over seven games. Angola finished in the fourth place.

Later in his career, Domingos represented the Angolan senior team at the 2019 FIBA Basketball World Cup in China, where he averaged 8.5 points, 2.5 rebounds and 2.5 assists per game.

== BAL career statistics ==
Legend
GP	Games played	GS	Games started	MPG	Minutes per game
FG%	Field goal percentage	3P%	3-point field goal percentage	FT%	Free throw percentage
RPG	Rebounds per game	APG	Assists per game	SPG	Steals per game
BPG	Blocks per game	PPG	Points per game	**Bold**	Career high

Year	Team	GP	GS	MPG	FG%	3P%	FT%	RPG	APG	SPG	BPG	PPG
2021	Petro de Luanda	6	0	11.4	.333	.333	1.000	1.3	1.2	0.3	.0	3.0
Career		6	0	11.4	.333	.333	1.000	1.3	1.2	0.3	.0	3.0
