= Glofate Buiamba =

Angolan basketball player (born 1999)

No. 12 – Petro de Luanda
- Position: Forward
- League: Angolan Basketball League

Personal information
- Born: 5 January 1999 (age 27) Luanda, Angola
- Listed height: 2.00 m (6 ft 7 in)
- Listed weight: 94 kg (207 lb)

Career information
- Playing career: 2018–present

Career history
- 2018–2019: ASA
- 2019–2022: Interclube
- 2022–present: Petro de Luanda
- 2021-2022: APL

Career highlights
- BAL champion (2024); Angolan League Fair Play Athlete (2022)
Medals
Men's basketball
Representing Angola
FIBA AfroCan
Bronze medal – third place	2019 Mali
FIBA Africa Under-18 Championship
Gold medal – first place	2016 Rwanda

Glofate Garcia Buiamba (born 5 January 1999) is an Angolan basketball player who plays for Petro de Luanda of the Angolan Basketball League and Angola.

== Early career ==
In 2017, Buiamba attended an NBA Basketball Without Borders camp in New Orleans.

== Professional career ==
Buiamba played his first season with Atlético Sport Aviação (ASA) in the 2018–19 season. The following season, he joined Interclube who helped to reach the finals of the Angolan League two consecutive years in 2021 and 2022.

He joined the defending champions Petro de Luanda in 2022. Buiamba won the 2024 BAL championship with Petro on June 1, 2024.

== National team career ==
=== Junior level ===
Buiamba played for the Angolan under-15 team at the 2015 FIBA Africa Under-16 Championship in Mali. He averaged a team-high 14.9 points and 11.6 rebounds per game in seven games. One year later, he played with the Angolan under-18 team at the 2016 FIBA Africa Under-18 Championship, winning a gold medal.

=== Senior level ===
Internationally, Buiamba plays for the Angola national basketball team. He played with Angola at FIBA AfroCan 2019 and FIBA AfroBasket 2021.

== Awards and accomplishments ==
=== International ===
Angola

- FIBA AfroCan (bronze) Bronze Medal: (2019 Mali)

Angola U18

- FIBA Africa Under-18 Championship (gold) Gold Medal: (Rwanda 2016)

=== Individual ===
- Angolan Basketball League Fair Play Athlete: (2022)
- Angolan Basketball League Best Free Throw Scorer: (2021)
