= Jilson Bango =

Angolan basketball player

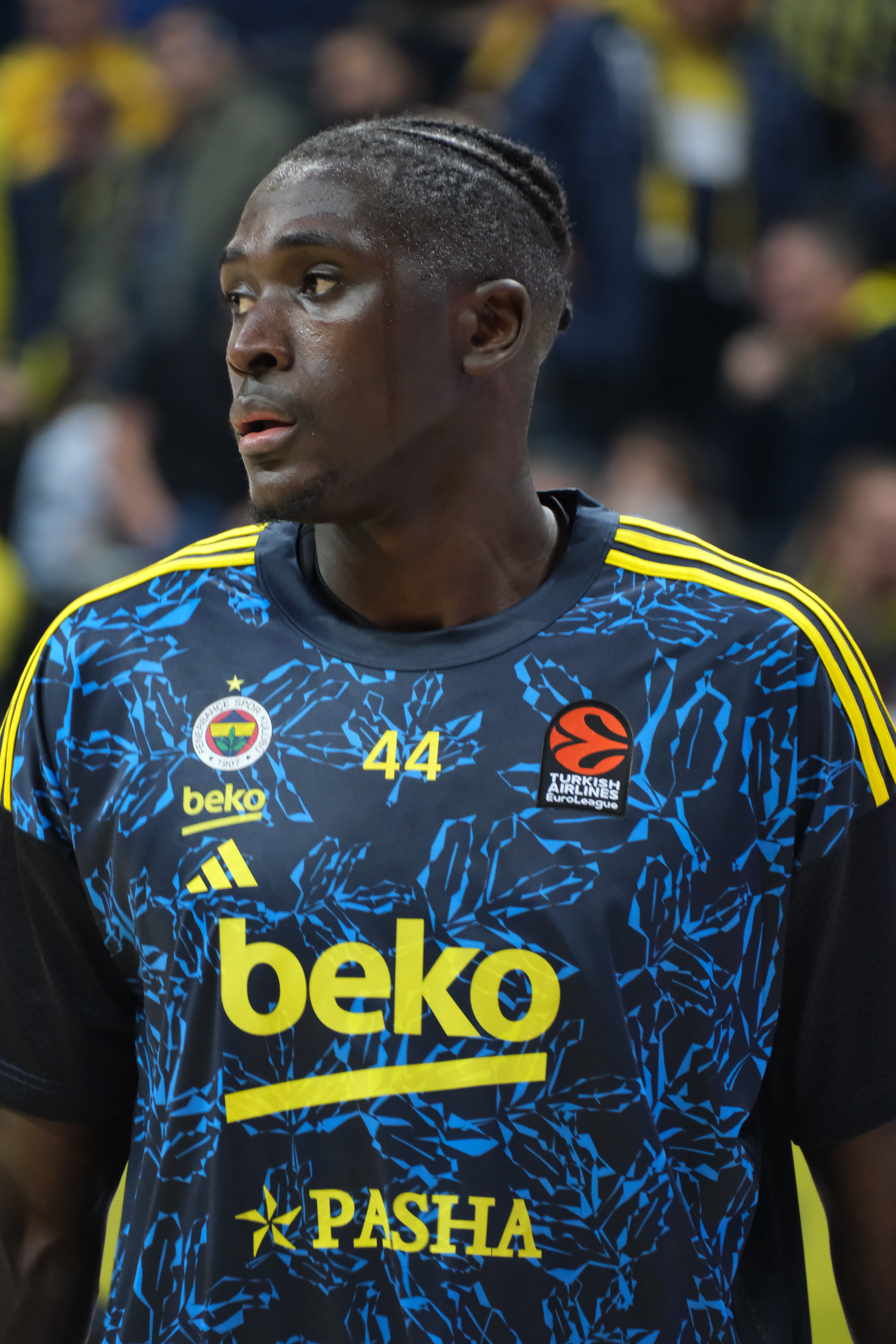
- Bango with Fenerbahçe in 2025

No. 44 – Basket Zaragoza
- Position: Power forward / center
- League: Liga ACB

Personal information
- Born: 6 January 1999 (age 27) Sumbe, Angola
- Listed height: 2.08 m (6 ft 10 in)
- Listed weight: 94 kg (207 lb)

Career information
- NBA draft: 2021: undrafted
- Playing career: 2018–present

Career history
- 2018–2019: Marinha de Guerra
- 2019–2022: Primeiro de Agosto
- 2022–2024: Braunschweig
- 2024–2025: Zaragoza
- 2025–2026: Fenerbahçe
- 2026–present: Zaragoza

Career highlights
- EuroLeague champion (2025); Turkish Super League champion (2026); Angola Cup winner (2021); 2× Angolan League Regular Season MVP (2021, 2022); Angolan League Best Rebounder (2021)
Medals
Men's basketball
Representing Angola
AfroBasket
Gold medal – first place	2025 Angola
FIBA AfroCan
Bronze medal – third place	2019 Mali

Jilson Luis Antonio Bango (born 6 January 1999) is an Angolan professional basketball player for Zaragoza of the Liga ACB. He also represents the Angolan national team in international competition. Standing at 2.08 m (6 ft 10 in), he plays at the power forward or the center position.

== Professional career ==
=== Early career ===
He started his career with Marinha de Guerra, which club is attached to the Angolan Navy and an affiliate of Primeiro de Agosto. In 2019, Bango started playing for Primeiro de Agosto. He was named the Angolan Basketball League's Regular Season MVP for two consecutive seasons (2021 and 2022). Bango also led the league in rebounding in 2021.

=== Braunschweig ===
On 9 September 2022, Bango signed a three-year contract with the Basketball Löwen Braunschweig of the German Basketball Bundesliga.

On 3 October, he recorded 16 points and 9 rebounds in his league debut against Würzburg. In 2022–23 Basketball Bundesliga, he averaged 9.4 pts and 6.5 rbs in 24 games and in 2023–24 Basketball Bundesliga, he averaged 13.5 pts and 7.1 rbs in 34 games.

=== Zaragoza ===
On 25 May 2024, Bango signed with Basket Zaragoza of the Spanish Liga ACB.

On 4 November 2024, Bango received a Hoops Agents Player of the Week award for Round 6, he had 21 points and 10 rebounds. In 2024–25 Liga ACB, Bango averaged 13.9 pts and 5.6 rbs with 16.1 pir in 19 games played. He also averaged 14.3 pts and 5.8 rbs in 9 games played in 2024–25 FIBA Europe Cup.

=== Fenerbahçe ===
On 3 February 2025, Fenerbahçe announced that he had joined the club until the end of the 2026–27 season.

On 6 February 2025, he made his EuroLeague debut against Real Madrid in a 78–67 victory. On 6 March 2025, he recorded 8 points and 5 rebounds with 11 PIR in his third EuroLeague match against Olimpia Milano.

On 29 April 2025, he helped Fenerbahçe sweep Paris Basketball as 3–0 in playoffs, contributing 6 points and 3 rebounds successful first quarter performance in 88–98 away wictory.

On 25 May 2025, he was a member of Fenerbahçe squad, which won their second EuroLeague championship in Abu Dhabi.

== National team career ==
Internationally, Bango respresents the Angola national basketball team. He played with Angola at FIBA AfroCan 2019 and FIBA AfroBasket 2021, where he averaged 9.6 pts and 9.6 rbs as the team's starting center.

In FIBA World Cup 2023, he averaged 9.4 pts 7.4 rbs.

On 21 August 2025, he ruptured the anterior cruciate ligament (ACL) in his left knee in the 2025 AfroBasket quarterfinal match against Cape Verde and will expected to be out for about seven months. He recorded 6.3 pts, 5.3 rbs and 0.5 assist performance at the tournament.

== Career statistics ==
Legend
GP	Games played	GS	Games started	MPG	Minutes per game
FG%	Field-goal percentage	3P%	3-point field-goal percentage	FT%	Free-throw percentage
RPG	Rebounds per game	APG	Assists per game	SPG	Steals per game
BPG	Blocks per game	PPG	Points per game	PIR	Performance index rating
**Bold**	Career high	†	Won a EuroLeague championship

=== EuroLeague ===
Year	Team	GP	GS	MPG	FG%	3P%	FT%	RPG	APG	SPG	BPG	PPG	PIR
2024–25†	Fenerbahçe Beko	10	0	7.0	.588	.000	.875	1.8	.1	.2	.0	2.7	3.0

=== EuroCup ===
Year	Team	GP	GS	MPG	FG%	3P%	FT%	RPG	APG	SPG	BPG	PPG	PIR
2024–25	Basket Zaragoza	10	10	20.2	.784	.000	.622	5.7	.5	.5	.8	13.9	16.2

=== Domestic leagues ===
Year	Team	League	GP	MPG	FG%	3P%	FT%	RPG	APG	SPG	BPG	PPG
2022–23	(Germany) Braunschweig	BBL	24	22.5	.674	.000	.691	6.5	.5	.5	.8	9.4
2023–24	(Germany) Braunschweig	BBL	34	23.7	.679	.000	.686	7.1	1.0	.5	1.6	13.5
2024–25	(Spain) Basket Zaragoza	ACB	19	20.8	.660	.000	.634	5.6	.8	.3	.5	13.9

== Honours ==
=== Club ===
(Angola) Primeiro de Agosto

- Taça de Angola: 2020–21

(Turkey) Fenerbahçe

- EuroLeague: 2024–25
- Turkish Super League: 2024–25
- Turkish Cup: 2025

=== International ===
- AfroBasket: (gold) 2025
- FIBA AfroCan: (bronze) 2019

=== Individual ===
- Angolan League Regular Season MVP: 2021, 2022
- Angolan League Best Rebounder: 2021
