= Thierry Darlan =

Central African basketball player (born 2004)

No. 15 – Santa Clara Broncos
- Position: Shooting guard / small forward
- League: West Coast Conference

Personal information
- Born: 3 February 2004 (age 22) Bangui, Central African Republic
- Listed height: 6 ft 8 in (2.03 m)
- Listed weight: 211 lb (96 kg)

Career information
- High school: NBA Academy Africa (Saly, Senegal)
- College: Santa Clara (2025–present)
- Playing career: 2021–present

Career history
- 2022: Petro de Luanda
- 2023–2024: NBA G League Ignite
- 2024: Bangui
- 2024: Rip City Remix
- 2025: Delaware Blue Coats

Career highlights
- NBA G League Next Up Game (2024)

Thierry Serge Darlan (born 3 February 2004) is a Central African college basketball player for the Santa Clara Broncos of the West Coast Conference. A graduate of the NBA Academy Africa in Senegal, Darlan also plays for the Central African Republic national team.

== Early career ==
Born in Bangui, Darlan joined the NBA Academy Africa in Senegal at age 16.

Darlan was invited to the Nike Hoop Summit in Portland in 2022, but was forced to miss the game due to an injury. In September 2022, he played at the Basketball Without Borders event in Cairo where was named the camp's MVP.

== College career ==
Darlan became the first professional athlete to obtain NCAA eligibility after he spent two years in the NBA G League (with one of those years being in the G League's own NBA G League Ignite project). The NCAA's decision to grant Darlan two years of eligibility was based on his age and years removed from high school at the NBA Academy. The NCAA also ruled in favor of Darlan's eligibility largely because many international players who had played professionally abroad were also granted eligibility in the past. He signed to the Santa Clara Broncos on September 23, 2025.

== Professional career ==
=== First experiences in the BAL (2022) ===
Darlan made his professional debut in 2022 with Angolan club Petro de Luanda in the Basketball Africa League (BAL). Under the BAL Elevate program, he was assigned to Petro. He was on the roster that made it to the 2022 BAL Finals, where they lost to US Monastir. He averaged 4.3 points and 2 rebounds in the 2022 BAL season.

In the same year, in November 2022, Darlan and the NBA Academy played in the Road to BAL 2023 where they faced professional teams from across the continent. He averaged a team-high 23 points per game, as well as 5.7 assists per game, helping the academy win two out of three games.

=== NBA G League Ignite (2023–2024) ===
On 2 March 2023, Darlan committed to the NBA G League Ignite, choosing to become a professional player instead of playing in college. He had drawn offers from Arizona, Kansas and Santa Clara, among others. On 25 May, he officially signed with the Ignite. Dealing with an ankle injury for the majority of the season and facing heavy competition for playing time, Darlan averaged 4.7 points, 4.3 rebounds in 18.1 minutes of play in the 2023–24 season.

=== Bangui Sporting Club (2024) ===
On 4 April 2024, Bangui Sporting Club from the Central African Republic revealed Darlan was on the team's roster for the 2024 BAL season. Darlan scored 7 points on 3-11 shooting in his Bangui debut against Al-Ahly Ly. He had career-highs of 23 points and 14 rebounds in a loss against defending champions Al Ahly.

On 25 April 2024, Darlan declared for the 2024 NBA draft, before withdrawing later.

=== Rip City Remix (2024) ===
On 26 October 2024, Darlan joined the Rip City Remix after being selected in the 2024 NBA G League draft.

=== Delaware Blue Coats (2025) ===
On 4 January 2025, Darlan was traded to the Delaware Blue Coats. On 10 January 2025, Darlan recorded 23 points and 11 rebounds in his first start for the Blue Coats. On 23 March 2025, Darlan recorded a season high 28 points in a loss to the Maine Celtics. After the season, he announced he would go to college and play college basketball after the NCAA had ruled him eligible.

== National team career ==
Darlan made his debut for the Central African Republic senior national team in 2022 during the 2023 World Cup qualifiers, in which he averaged 12.7 points in three games. He made his debut at age 18 in July 2022 during the third round of the qualifiers, scoring 12 points in the game against Guinea.

== Player profile ==
Darlan is a 6 ft 6 in (1.98 m) tall combo guard with a 7 ft 1 in (2.16 m) wingspan and is known for his playmaking abilities and defensive versatility because of his large frame.

== Career statistics ==
Legend
GP	Games played	GS	Games started	MPG	Minutes per game
FG%	Field goal percentage	3P%	3-point field goal percentage	FT%	Free throw percentage
RPG	Rebounds per game	APG	Assists per game	SPG	Steals per game
BPG	Blocks per game	PPG	Points per game	**Bold**	Career high

=== BAL ===
==== Regular season ====
Year	Team	GP	GS	MPG	FG%	3P%	FT%	RPG	APG	SPG	BPG	PPG
2021	Petro de Luanda	3	0	6	.444	.333	.667	2.0	0	.3	.3	4.3

=== NBA G League ===
Year	Team	GP	GS	MPG	FG%	3P%	FT%	RPG	APG	SPG	BPG	PPG
23-24	NBA G League Ignite	29	10	18.1	.404	.341	.741	4.2	.8	.5	.3	4.7
24-25	Delaware Blue Coats	29	12	25.7	.457	.371	.673	6.0	2.0	1.1	1.2	10.9

== Personal life ==
Darlan is the grandson of Jean Pascal Darlan and the cousin of Bruno Darlan (b. 1961), who both were basketball players. Bruno was the head coach of the Central African Republic men's national basketball team when Thierry played with them.

Darlan is a fan of association football club FC Barcelona and Lionel Messi.
