= Yanick Moreira =

Angolan basketball player (born 1991)

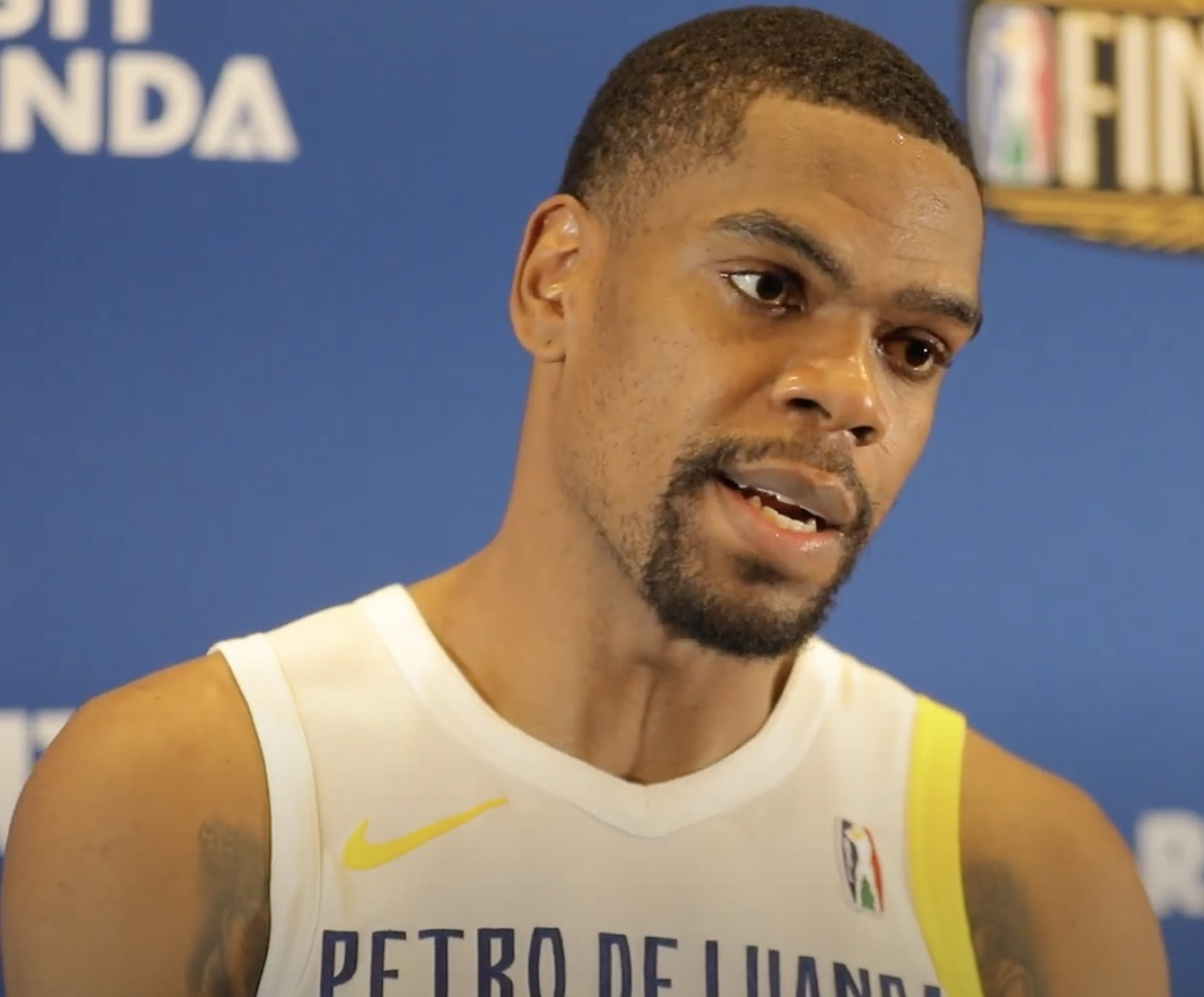
- Moreira after the 2022 BAL Finals

No. 2 – Petro de Luanda
- Position: Center
- League: Unitel Basket; BAL

Personal information
- Born: July 31, 1991 (age 35) Luanda, Angola
- Listed height: 6 ft 11 in (2.11 m)
- Listed weight: 220 lb (100 kg)

Career information
- High school: Colégio Herinália Janete (Luanda, Angola)
- College: South Plains (2011–2013); SMU (2013–2015)
- NBA draft: 2015: undrafted
- Playing career: 2008–present

Career history
- 2008–2011: Primeiro de Agosto
- 2015–2016: Rouen Métropole
- 2016: UCAM Murcia
- 2016–2017: Raptors 905
- 2017: Sanat Naft Abadan
- 2017–2018: Parma
- 2018–2019: PAOK Thessaloniki
- 2019: Virtus Bologna
- 2019–2020: Peristeri
- 2020–2021: AEK Athens
- 2021–2022: Peristeri
- 2022: Petro de Luanda
- 2022–2023: Kolossos Rodou
- 2023: Hapoel Afula
- 2023–present: Petro de Luanda

Career highlights
- FIBA Champions League champion (2019); NBA D-League champion (2017); BAL champion (2024); 4× Angolan League champion (2008–2010, 2022); 3× Angolan Cup winner (2008, 2009, 2022); 4× Angolan Supercup champion (2007–2010); Second-team All-AAC (2015); AAC Most Improved Player (2015); First-team NJCAA D1 All-American (2013); NJCAA D1 champion (2012); NJCAA D1 Tournament MVP (2012)
- Stats at Basketball Reference
Medals
Men's basketball
Representing Angola
AfroBasket
Silver medal – second place	Radès 2015	National team
FIBA Africa Under-18 Championship
Silver medal – second place	Alexandria 2008	National team

Yanick Pires Moreira (born July 31, 1991) is an Angolan professional basketball player who plays for Petro de Luanda of the Angolan Basketball League and the Basketball Africa League (BAL). He played two seasons of college basketball for the SMU Mustangs.

== Early life and college career ==
From 2008 to 2011, Moreira played for Primeiro de Agosto of the Angolan League before moving to the United States to attend South Plains College. After playing two seasons with South Plains, he transferred to Southern Methodist University where he graduated in 2015. Moreira was called for goaltending on a three-point field goal by Bryce Alford, in the closing seconds of the Mustangs' second-round game of the 2015 NCAA Men's Division I Basketball Tournament against UCLA. Moreira took responsibility for the loss, saying "It's all my fault. I should have let the ball hit the rim. I shouldn't have made that mistake as a senior."

== Professional career ==
After going undrafted in the 2015 NBA draft, Moreira joined the Los Angeles Clippers for the 2015 NBA Summer League. In September 2015, he was ruled out for four to six weeks with a minor ligament tear in his left foot. On November 29, 2015, he signed with Rouen Métropole Basket of the French LNB Pro A. In April 2016, he left Rouen and signed with Angolan club Petro de Luanda. He was later loaned to Spanish club UCAM Murcia for the rest of the 2015–16 ACB season.

In July 2016, Moreira joined the Toronto Raptors for the 2016 NBA Summer League. On August 11, 2016, he signed with the Raptors, but was waived on October 22, 2016, after appearing in one preseason game. On October 30, 2016, he was acquired by Raptors 905 of the NBA Development League as an affiliate player of Toronto. On May 3, 2017, he signed with Sanat Naft Abadan of the Iranian Super League.

On July 13, 2017, Moreira signed with Russian club Parma for the 2017–18 season. He averaged 9 points and 6 rebounds per game in the VTB league. On August 5, 2018, Moreira joined the Greek club PAOK. Moreira spent the 2019–20 season with Peristeri and averaged 12.7 points and 6.7 rebounds per game.

He signed with AEK Athens on June 18, 2020. He was voted as the MVP of the month for November in the Basketball Champions League after averaging 17.7 points and 6.3 rebounds per game. Overall, Moreira averaged 13 points, 6.2 rebounds, 1.4 blocks, and 1.2 assists throughout the 2020-21 campaign with AEK.

On July 28, 2021, Moreira officially returned to Peristeri. On January 3, 2022, he parted ways once again with the club. During his second stint, Moreira averaged 7 points and 4.5 rebounds, playing only 15 minutes per game.

On March 14, 2022, Moreira returned to Angola, signing with Petro de Luanda of the Angolan Basketball League. In Petro's BAL Season 2 campaign, he averaged 11.4 points and 5.6 rebounds per game coming off the bench and helped the team reach the 2022 BAL Finals. In the final, Moreira scored 18 points and grabbed 7 rebounds, however, US Monastir was able to hold off Petro and win their first BAL championship.

On September 20, 2022, Moreira signed with Greek Basket League club Kolossos Rodou. In 26 games, he averaged 8.7 points, 5.1 rebounds and 1 assist, playing around 19 minutes per contest.

On December 5, 2023, Moreira returned to Petro de Luanda for a second stint. They won their first BAL championship on June 1, 2024, following a win in the final over Al Ahly Ly. Moreira contributed 12 points and 7 rebounds in the final victory.

== National team career ==
Moreira has been a regular member of the Angola national basketball team since 2010, having competed at the 2014 FIBA Basketball World Cup. At the 2014 FIBA Basketball World Cup, Moreira scored a tournament-high and career-high 38 points, along with 15 rebounds, in an 83–91 win against Australia.
