= Angolan Basketball League MVP =

- Sport: Basketball
- League: Angolan Basketball League
- Awarded for: Best performing player in the season of the Angolan Basketball League
- Country: Angola

History
- First award: 1997–98
- Most wins: Olímpio Cipriano (4)
- Most recent: Aboubakar Gakou, Petro de Luanda (2024–25)

The Angolan Basketball League MVP Award, for sponsorships reasons named the Unitel Basket MVP, is an annual basketball award given out to the most valuable player of a given Angolan Basketball League season.

The award was first handed out in 1998. Olímpio Cipriano won a record four MVP awards in his career. Aboubakar Gakou and Eduardo Mingas both won three awards. American-born Cedric Isom is the only foreign player in the league's history to have won the award.

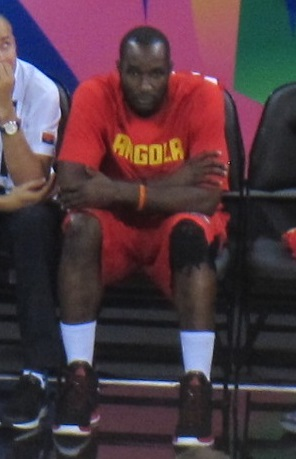
Olímpio Cipriano holds the record for most wins with 4 MVP awards

== Winners ==
^	Denotes player who is still active in the Angolan Basketball League
Player (X)	Denotes the number of times the player has been awarded the award

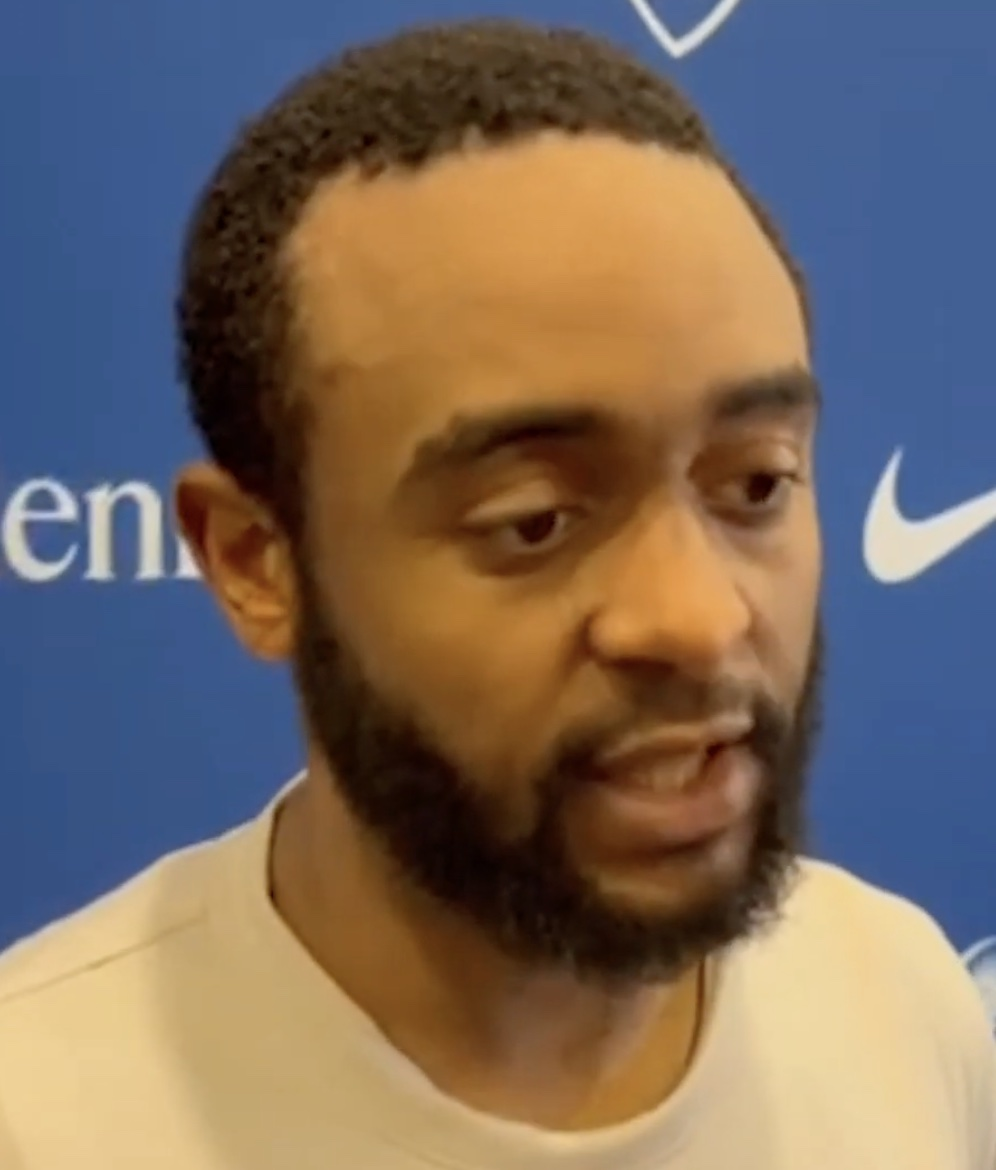
Gerson Gonçalves is a two-time winner with awards in 2019 and 2022

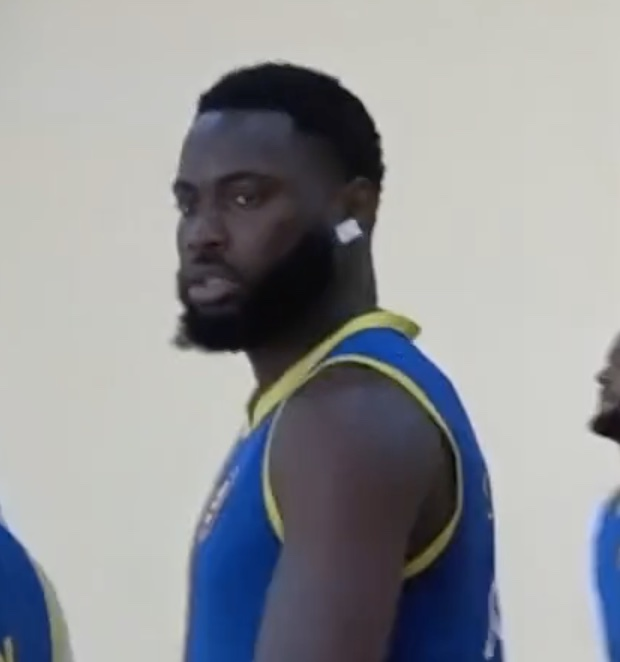
Aboubakar Gakou won the MVP award in 2021, 2023 and 2025

Season	Player	Position	Team	Ref.
1997–98	Carlos Almeida	Guard	Petro de Luanda	
2001–02	Gerson dos Santos		Vila Clotilde	
2002–03	Miguel Lutonda	Guard	Primeiro de Agosto	
2003–04	Eduardo Mingas^	Forward	Interclube	
2005–06	Francisco Jordão	Forward	Petro de Luanda	
2006–07	Carlos Morais^	Guard	Petro de Luanda	
2007–08	Olímpio Cipriano^	Forward	Primeiro de Agosto	
2008–09	Kikas Gomes	Forward/Center	Primeiro de Agosto	
2009–10	Olímpio Cipriano (2)^	Forward	Libolo	
2010–11	Olímpio Cipriano (3)^	Forward	Libolo	
2011–12	Cedric Isom	Guard	Primeiro de Agosto	
2012–13	Eduardo Mingas (2)^	Forward	Libolo	
2014–15	Leonel Paulo^	Forward/Center	Petro de Luanda	
2015–16	Hermenegildo Santos^	Guard	Primeiro de Agosto	
2016–17	Olímpio Cipriano (4)^	Forward	Libolo	
2017–18	Eduardo Mingas (3)^	Forward	Primeiro de Agosto	
2018–19	Gerson Gonçalves^	Guard	Petro de Luanda	
2020–21	Aboubakar Gakou^	Forward	Petro de Luanda	
2021–22	Gerson Gonçalves (2)^	Guard	Petro de Luanda	
2022–23	Aboubakar Gakou (2)	Forward	Petro de Luanda	
2023–24	Childe Dundão	Guard	Petro de Luanda	
2024–25	Aboubakar Gakou (3)	Forward	Petro de Luanda	

== Awards by player ==
Four players have won the MVP award more than once. Olímpio Cipriano holds the record with four awards.

Team	Winners	Years
(Angola) Olímpio Cipriano	4	2008, 2010, 2011, 2017
(Angola) Eduardo Mingas	3	2004, 2013, 2018
(Angola) Aboubakar Gakou	3	2021, 2023, 2025
(Angola) Gerson Gonçalves	2	2019, 2022

== Winners by team ==
Team	Winners
Petro de Luanda	10
Primeiro de Agosto	6
