= 2021–22 Angolan Basketball League =

44th season of the Angolan Basketball League

- Season: 2021–22
- Dates: 22 December 2021 – 10 May 2022
- Teams: 13

Regular season
- BAL: Petro de Luanda
- Season MVP: Gerson Gonçalves (Petro)

Finals
- Champions: Petro de Luanda (15th title)
- Runners-up: Interclube

Awards
- Regular Season MVP: Jilson Bango (Primeiro)

The 2021–22 Angolan Basketball League, for sponsorship reasons the 2021–22 Unitel Basket, is the 44th season of the Angolan Basketball League, the highest premier basketball league in Angola. The season consisted of 13 teams and began on 22 December 2021 and ended on 10 May 2022.

Petro de Luanda won its 15th national title while also winning the Angolan Cup and Supercup this season. In all league games, Petro was unbeaten and had a 31–0 record including the playoffs.

== Teams ==
The league expanded from nine to thirteen teams as Akira Academy, CPPL (after 6 years of absence), Clube Amigos de Benguela and Interclube B entered the league.

Club	Location	Venue	Capacity	Head coach
Akira Academy	Luanda			
ASA	Luanda	Pavilhão da Cidadela	6,873	
Clube Amigos de Benguela	Benguela			
CPPL	Lobito	Pavilhão da CPPL	2,000	
Jesus Cristo	Luanda			
Interclube	Luanda	Pavilhão 28 de Fevereiro	700	Raúl Duarte
Interclube B	Luanda	Pavilhão 28 de Fevereiro	700	
Petro de Luanda	Luanda	Pavilhão da Cidadela	6,873	José Neto
Petro de Luanda B	Luanda	Pavilhão da Cidadela	6,873	
Primeiro de Agosto	Luanda	Pavilhão Victorino Cunha	1,500	Zé Carlos
Primeiro de Agosto B	Luanda	Pavilhão Victorino Cunha	1,500	
Vila Clotilde	Luanda	Pavilhão Anexo	1,500	
Depsortivo Kwanza	Luanda	Pavilhão Victorino Cunha	1,500	

== Regular season ==
Pos.	Club	GP	W	L	PF	PA	PD	Pts	Qualification or relegation
1	Petro de Luanda (C)	26	26	0	3140	1795	+1345	52	Advance to playoffs
2	Interclube	26	21	5	2444	1786	+658	47	Advance to playoffs
3	Primeiro de Agosto	26	20	6	2593	1938	+655	46	Advance to playoffs
4	ASA	25	20	5	2103	1923	+180	45	Advance to playoffs
5	Vila Clotilde	26	14	12	2252	2115	+137	40	Advance to playoffs
6	Petro de Luanda B	26	13	13	2206	2252	–46	39	Advance to playoffs
7	Interclube B	25	13	12	2072	2061	+11	38	Advance to playoffs
8	CPPL	26	11	15	2071	2410	–339	37	Advance to playoffs
9	Jesus Cristo	24	11	13	1941	2090	–149	35	
10	Primeiro de Agosto B	24	6	18	1826	2222	–396	30	
11	Akiras Academy	24	4	20	1902	2220	–318	28	
12	Depsortivo Kwanza	24	4	20	1610	2084	–474	28	
13	Clube Amigos de Benguela	24	0	24	1371	2635	–1264	24	

(C): Champions; Source: FAB

== Playoffs ==
=== Bracket ===
Quarter-finals
1	Petro de Luanda	2
8	CPPL	0
4	Primeiro de Agosto	2
5	Vila Clotilde	0
2	Interclube	2
7	Petro de Luanda B	0
3	ASA	2
6	Interclube B	0

Semi-finals
1	Petro de Luanda	2
4	Primeiro de Agosto	0
2	Interclube	2
3	ASA	0

Finals
1	Petro de Luanda	3
2	Interclube	0

=== Quarterfinals ===
The semifinals were played on 22 April, 23 April and 24 April 2022.

Team 1	Series	Team 2	Game 1	Game 2	Game 3
Petro de Luanda	2–0	CPPL	120–72	128–75	
ASA	2–0	Interclube B	86–80	88–87	
Interclube	2–0	Petro de Luanda B	91-84	105–73	
Primeiro de Agosto	2–0	Vila Clotilde	100–70	83–75	

=== Semifinals ===
The semifinals were played on 29 April and 30 April 2022.

Team 1	Series	Team 2	Game 1	Game 2	Game 3
Petro de Luanda	2–0	Primeiro de Agosto	100–66	95–71	
Interclube	2–0	ASA	80–70	80–72	

=== Finals ===
The finals were played on 6, 7 and 10 May 2022.

Team 1	Series	Team 2	Game 1	Game 2	Game 3	Game 4	Game 5
Petro de Luanda	3–0	Interclube	129–74	102–91	115–87		

==== Games ====
6 May 2022 Game 1	Petro de Luanda	129–74	Interclube	Luanda
18:00 GMT
	Pts: Aboubakar 22; Rebs: Moreira 11; Asts: Gerson 8	Boxscore	Pts: Buiamba 18; Rebs: Buiamba 11; Asts: Félix 5	Arena: Kilamba Arena

7 May 2022 Game 2	Petro de Luanda	102–91	Interclube	Luanda
18:00 GMT	Scoring by quarter: 36–23, 22–26, 21–18, 23–24
	Pts: Morais 30; Rebs: Aboubakar 10; Asts: Gerson 6	Boxscore	Pts: Buiamba 20; Rebs: Cabita 9 Asts: Ventura 3	Arena: Kilamba Arena; Attendance: 112

10 May 2022 Game 3	Interclube	87–115	Petro de Luanda	Luanda
18:00 GMT	Scoring by quarter: 20–28, 24–28, 31–32, 12–27
	Pts: Buiamba 31; Rebs: Buiamba 13; Asts: Buiamba, Ndjungo 3	Boxscore	Pts: Morais 25; Rebs: Moreira, Dundão 10; Asts: Dundão 6	Arena: Pavilhão da Cidadela; Attendance: 890

== Individual awards ==
Category	Player	Team(s)	Ref.
Most Valuable Player	Gerson Gonçalves	Petro de Luanda	
Regular Season MVP	Jilson Bango	Primeiro de Agosto	
Best Coach	José Neto	Petro de Luanda	
Fair Play Athlete	Glofate Buiamba	Interclube	
Best Referee	Cláudio Eiuba	–	

== Statistics ==
Category	Player	Team(s)	Statistic
Points per game	Miguel Maconda	Jesus Cristo	22.2
Rebounds per game	Wilson Kassav	Jesus Cristo	15.0
Assists per game	Gerson Gonçalves	Petro de Luanda	6.2
Steals per game	Childe Dundão	Petro de Luanda	2.6
2FG%	Jone Pedro	Petro de Luanda	76.1%
FT%	Valdemar João	FC Vila Clotilde	92.2%
3FG%	Sebastião Quicuame	FC Vila Clotilde	39.2%
