= Jone Pedro =

Angolan basketball player (born 1990)

No. 17 – Interclube
- Position: Center

Personal information
- Born: 28 March 1990 (age 36) Algés, Portugal
- Listed height: 2.08 m (6 ft 10 in)
- Listed weight: 93 kg (205 lb)

Career information
- NBA draft: 2012: undrafted
- Playing career: 2011–present

Career history
- 2011–2012: Giants Düsseldorf
- 2012–2013: TBB Trier
- 2013–2014: ASA
- 2014–2019: Primeiro de Agosto
- 2019: Galitos Barreiro
- 2019–2024: Petro de Luanda
- 2025–present: Interclube

Career highlights
- BAL champion (2024); 4× Angolan League champion (2021–2024); 2× Angolan Cup winner (2022, 2023); 3× Angolan Supercup winner (2021–2023)

Jone Lopes Pedro (born 28 March 1990) is an Angolan-Portuguese-German basketball player currently plays for Interclube. He also plays for the Angola national basketball team.

== Early life ==
Pedro was born as the song of Adriano Pedro, and was born in Portugal where his father played professional basketball. He later moved to Germany along with his father, and after playing multiple sports, including football and table tennis, he started playing basketball at age 14, after he had a major growth spurt. At age 19, he moved back to Angola and played for Lubango-based Huíla.

== Professional career ==
Pedro started his professional career with Giants Düsseldorf in 2011. In 2013, Pedro left for Angola to play for ASA in the Angolan Basketball League.

In June 2019, Pedro joined Petro de Luanda. On 18 May 2021, in his debut in the Basketball Africa League (BAL), Pedro had 17 points and 17 rebounds in a win against AS Police. Pedro won the 2024 BAL championship with Petro, his first continental title. Pedro left the team after his contract ended after the 2023–24 season.

In January 2025, Pedro joined Interclube.

== National team career ==
Pedro has been a member of the Angolan national basketball team and has played with his country in the qualifiers for the 2019 FIBA Basketball World Cup. He has also played for the Angolan 3x3 basketball team.

== Personal ==
Pedro lived in the Netherlands and Portugal as a child and is the son of Adriano Pedro, who was an Angolan national team basketball player. He has a younger sister.

== BAL career statistics ==
Legend
GP	Games played	GS	Games started	MPG	Minutes per game
FG%	Field goal percentage	3P%	3-point field goal percentage	FT%	Free throw percentage
RPG	Rebounds per game	APG	Assists per game	SPG	Steals per game
BPG	Blocks per game	PPG	Points per game	**Bold**	Career high

Year	Team	GP	GS	MPG	FG%	3P%	FT%	RPG	APG	SPG	BPG	PPG
2021	Petro de Luanda	6	6	**25.1**	.636	–	.588	**10.5**	**1.0**	1.2	1.5	**11.0**
2022	Petro de Luanda	**8**	1	21.5	.658	–	.524	6.5	1.1	.8	**1.4**	7.6
2023	Petro de Luanda	**8**	**7**	18.7	**.674**	–	**.593**	5.4	**1.4**	.3	.9	9.3
