= Childe Dundão =

Angolan basketball player (born 1998)

No. 55 – FC Porto
- Position: Point guard
- League: Liga Betclic

Personal information
- Born: 17 May 1998 (age 28) Luanda, Angola
- Listed height: 1.67 m (5 ft 6 in)

Career information
- Playing career: 2016–present

Career history
- 2016–2026: Petro de Luanda
- 2026–present: FC Porto

Career highlights
- FIBA AfroBasket MVP (2025); BAL champion (2024); All-BAL First Team (2026); 3× BAL All-Defensive First Team (2022, 2023, 2026); 2× BAL All-Defensive Second Team (2024, 2025); BAL steals leader (2022); 6× Angolan League champion (2019, 2021–2025); Angolan League MVP (2024); 3× Angolan Cup winner (2022, 2023, 2025); Angolan Cup Final MVP (2023); 3× Angolan Supercup winner (2021, 2022, 2024); Portuguese Super Cup winner (2026); 3× Angolan League assists leader (2023–2025)
Medals
Men's basketball
Representing Angola
AfroBasket
Gold medal – first place	2025 Angola

Childe Madaleno Fortuna Dundão (born 17 May 1998) is an Angolan basketball player who plays for FC Porto of the Liga Portuguesa de Basquetebol. Standing at 1.67 m (5 ft 5 1/2 in), he plays as point guard.

He also plays for the Angola national team and led the team to a gold medal at FIBA AfroBasket 2025, while being named the AfroBasket Most Valuable Player.

== Professional career ==
=== Petro de Luanda (2016–2026) ===
Dundão started his career with Petro de Luanda in 2016. On 8 January, he re-signed for another season.

Dundão helped Petro reach the 2022 BAL Finals as the team's starting point guard, gathering All-Defensive Team honours in the same season.

In the 2023 season, Dundão won the national triple with Petro; he also lead the league in assists per game. He was named the 2023 Angolan Cup Final MVP.

On May 12, 2024, Dundão won his first Angolan Basketball League MVP award on the same day he guided Petro to a fifth consecutive. One month later, on June 1, Petro won their first BAL championship.

In the 2024–25 season, Dundão and Petro lost the BAL finals to Al Ahli Tripoli. He was named to a fourth All-Defensive Team.

=== FC Porto (2026–present) ===
On June 25, 2026, Dundão signed with the Portuguese team FC Porto.

== National team career ==
Dundão has played for the Angola national junior teams in the 2016 FIBA Africa Under-18 Championship and the 2017 FIBA Under-19 Basketball World Cup.

He has been a major part of the Angola senior team in recent years, and played with his country at the AfroBasket in 2021 and 2025, as well as the World Cup in 2023. Dundão also played at the FIBA AfroCan 2019, where he won a bronze medal.

At FIBA AfroBasket 2025, Angola won its 12th continental title, behind Dundão who was named the tournaments MVP. Dundão scored a game-high 30 points in the quarterfinal against Cape Verde. He led the team with 16 points in the final which ended in a blowout over Mali.
