= Anderson Correia (basketball) =

Cape Verdean basketball player (born 1997)

No. 12 – Kriol Star
- Position: Shooting guard
- League: Basketball Africa League

Personal information
- Born: 31 October 1997 (age 29)
- Listed height: 1.95 m (6 ft 5 in)

Career information
- NBA draft: 2019: undrafted
- Playing career: 2018–present

Career history
- 2018–2020: Clube do Prédio
- 2020–2021: Coração do Ribatejo
- 2021: Achada Panters
- 2021–2022: Coração do Ribatejo
- 2022: Petro de Luanda
- 2022–2023: Sangalhos DC
- 2023: Petro de Luanda
- 2023–present: Alfinden CB Zaragoza

Career highlights
- Angolan League champion (2022); Angolan Cup winner (2022)

Anderson Arménio Gomes Correia (born 31 October 1997) is a Cape Verdean basketball player who plays for Kriol Star of the Basketball Africa League and the Cape Verde national team. Standing at 1.95 m (6 ft 5 in), he plays as shooting guard.

== Professional career ==
During the 2018 to 2020 seasons, Anderson performed for the Clube do Prédio - Cabo Verde, where he was Regional and National champion. 2020–21 season, Correia played for Coração do Ribatejo in the Portuguese Proliga. Correia also played with the Achada Panters in the 2021 Praia Basketball League, helping his team win the championship.

He started the 2021–22 season with Coração do Ribatejo of the Portuguese second-tier Proliga. He averaged 23.7 points and 11.8 rebounds per game before leaving the team. On 14 March 2022, Correia signed with Petro de Luanda of the Angolan Basketball League and the Basketball Africa League (BAL).

In November 2023, Correia joined Alfindén CB of the Liga EBA, where he played in the 2023–24 season.

== National team career ==
Correia was on the Cape Verde national basketball team for AfroBasket 2021.

== Awards and accomplishments ==
Petro de Luanda

- Taça de Angola: (2022)
