= 2018–19 Angolan Basketball League =

- Season: 2018–19
- Teams: 9

Regular season
- BAL: Petro de Luanda
- Season MVP: Gerson Gonçalves (Petro de Luanda)

Finals
- Champions: Petro de Luanda; 13th title
- Runners-up: Primeiro de Agosto

The 2018–19 Angolan Basketball League was the 41st season of the Angolan Basketball League, the highest premier basketball league in Angola. On 19 May 2019, Petro de Luanda won its 13th league title, which meant qualification for the 2020 Basketball Africa League (BAL) season.

== Teams ==
Helmarc Academia made its debut season.

Club	Location	Venue	Capacity
ASA	Luanda	Pavilhão da Cidadela	6,873
Helmarc Academia	Luanda	Pavilhão Multiusos do Kilamba	1,500
Interclube	Luanda	Pavilhão 28 de Fevereiro	700
Marinha	Luanda	Pavilhão Victorino Cunha	2,000
Petro de Luanda	Luanda	Pavilhão da Cidadela	6,873
Primeiro de Agosto	Luanda	Pavilhão Victorino Cunha	1,500
Universidade Lusíada	Luanda	Pavilhão Anexo	1,500
Vila Clotilde	Luanda	Pavilhão Anexo	1,500
Kwanza	Luanda	Pavilhão Victorino Cunha	1,500

== Regular season ==
Pos	Team	Pld	W	L	Qualification or relegation
1	Petro de Luanda (C)	29	26	3	Qualification to playoffs
2	Primeiro de Agosto	30	26	4	Qualification to playoffs
3	Interclube	29	20	9	Qualification to playoffs
4	ASA	29	18	11	Qualification to playoffs
5	Marinha	30	14	16	
6	Universidade Lusíada	29	11	18	
7	Vila Clotilde	29	10	19	
8	Helmarc Academia	29	6	23	
9	Kwanza	30	1	29	

Source: Afrobasket.com
(C) Champions

== Playoffs ==
Semi-finals
1 Petro de Luanda	3
4 ASA	0
2 Primeiro de Agosto	3
3 Interclube	0

Final
1 Petro de Luanda	4
2 Primeiro de Agosto	2

== Individual awards ==
Award	Player	Club	Ref.
Most Valuable Player	Gerson Gonçalves	Petro de Luanda	
Regular Season MVP	Joseney Joaquim	Lusíada	
Coach of the Year	Lazare Adingono	Petro de Luanda	
Referee of the Year	António Bernardo	–	
