= Jesus Cristo Basquetebol =

- League: Angolan Basketball League
- Founded: 2021
- History: Jesus Cristo Basquetebol; 2021–present
- Location: Viana, Luanda, Angola

Jesus Cristo Basquetebol, also known as Jesus Christ Basketball or simply J.C., is an Angolan basketball team based in Viana, Luanda Province. The team was founded in 2021 and entered the top flight Angolan Basketball League in the 2021 season. The team's name was chosen because the team mainly consists of Catholic players.

In their debut season, Jesus Cristo finished in the 9th and last place. In 2023, J.C. played in the play-offs for the first time when they lost to Petro de Luanda.

== Season by season ==
Season	Tier	League	Regular season					Playoffs	Taça de Angola
Season	Tier	League	Finish	Played	Wins	Losses	Win%	Playoffs	Taça de Angola
Jesus Cristo
2020–21	1	Angolan League	9th	8	0	8	.000	Did not qualify	
2021–22	1	Angolan League	9th	24	11	13	.458	Did not qualify	
2022–23	1	Angolan League	8th^	24	10	14	.417	Quarter-finalist	
2023–24	1	Angolan League	8th	21	8	13	.381	Did not qualify	
