= Carlos Morais (basketball) =

Angolan basketball player (born 1985)

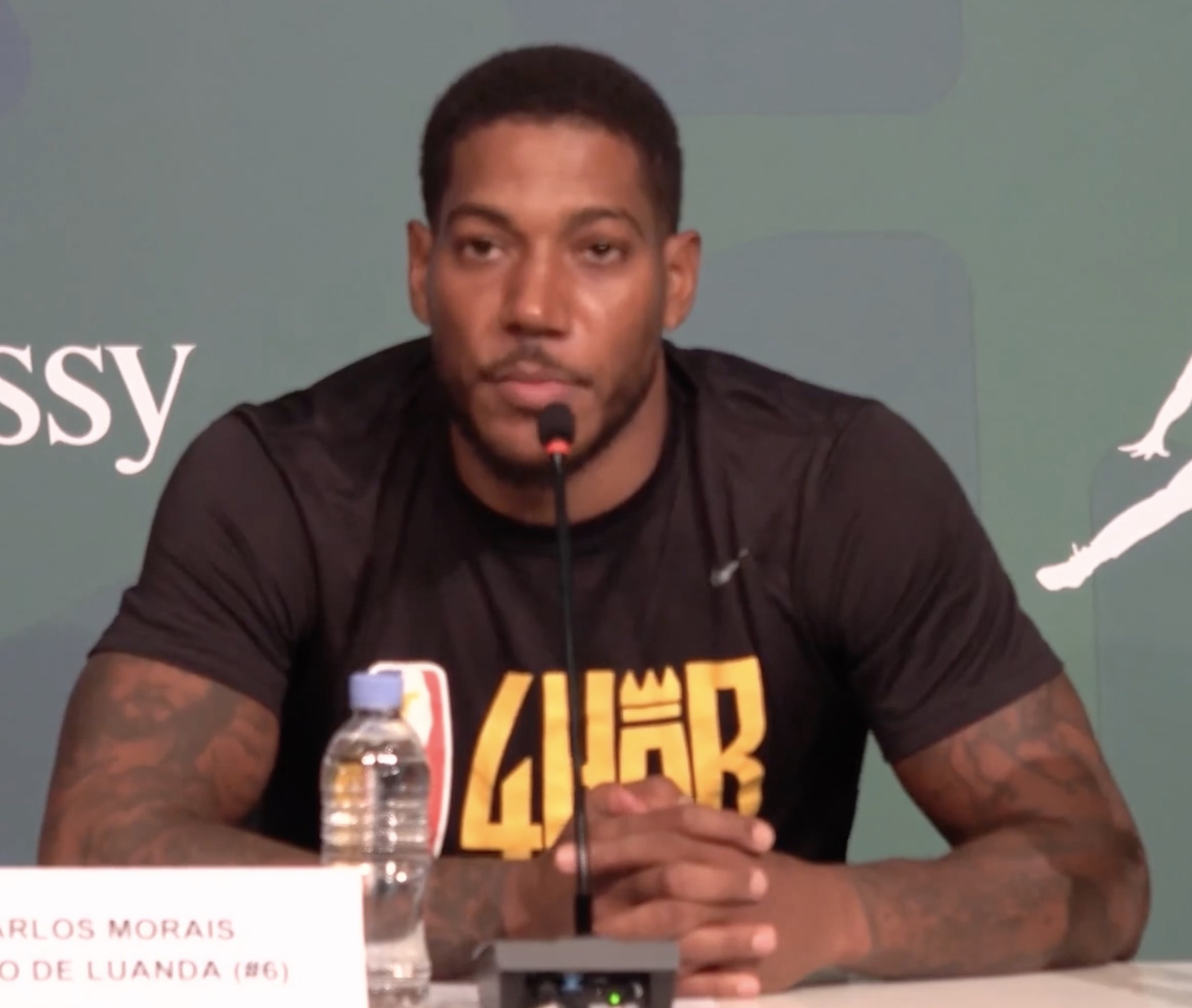
- Morais in 2023

No. 6 – Interclube
- Position: Shooting guard
- League: Unitel Basket; BAL

Personal information
- Born: 16 October 1985 (age 41) Luanda, Angola
- Listed height: 6 ft 4 in (1.93 m)
- Listed weight: 200 lb (91 kg)

Career information
- High school: Community Christian School (Stockbridge, Georgia)
- NBA draft: 2007: undrafted
- Playing career: 2001–present

Career history
- 2001–2009: Petro de Luanda
- 2009–2010: Recreativo do Libolo
- 2010–2013: Petro de Luanda
- 2013–2015: Recreativo Libolo
- 2016–2018: Benfica
- 2018–2019: Mens Sana
- 2019–2024: Petro de Luanda
- 2025–present: Interclube

Career highlights
- BAL champion (2024); All-BAL First Team (2022); FIBA Africa Champions Cup MVP (2012); 10× Angolan League champion (2008, 2009, 2011, 2013, 2014, 2019, 2021–2024); Angolan League MVP (2007); 4× Angolan League scoring champion (2011, 2013, 2016, 2021); 3× Angola Cup champion (2007, 2022, 2023); Portuguese League champion (2017); 2× Portuguese League All-Star (2017, 2018); Portuguese Cup champion (2017); Portuguese Cup MVP (2017); Portuguese Supercup champion (2017); All-Portuguese Import Player of the Year (2017); All-African Basketball League Best Guard (2011)
- Stats at Basketball Reference
Medals
Men's basketball
Representing Angola
AfroBasket
Gold medal – first place	Algiers 2005	National Team
Gold medal – first place	Luanda 2007	National Team
Gold medal – first place	Benghazi 2009	National Team
Gold medal – first place	Abidjan 2013	National Team
Silver medal – second place	Antananarivo 2011	National Team
Silver medal – second place	Radès 2015	National Team
FIBA Africa U18 Championship
Silver medal – second place	Alexandria 2002	Angola U18
FIBA Africa Clubs Champions Cup / BAL
Gold medal – first place	Lagos 2006	Petro Atlético
Silver medal – second place	Luanda 2007	Petro Atlético
Silver medal – second place	Malabo 2012	Petro Atlético
Silver medal – second place	Luanda 2015	Rec do Libolo
Silver medal – second place	Kigali 2022	Petro de Luanda
Bronze medal – third place	Sousse 2013	Rec do Libolo
Bronze medal – third place	Kigali 2021	Petro de Luanda

Carlos Edilson Alcântara Morais (Portuguese pronunciation: [muˈɾajʃ]; born 16 October 1985) is an Angolan basketball player for Interclube of the Angolan Basketball League. Standing at 1.93 m (6 ft 4 in), he plays as shooting guard, or small forward.

Morais is one of the most decorated players ever in Angolan basketball, as he has won nine Angolan League titles and was the league's MVP once (in 2007) and scoring leader four times. He spent two years in Portugal for Benfica, winning the national treble in 2017.

Representing the Angola national team, Morais has won four AfroBasket tournaments and has played at the 2008 Olympics.

== Early career ==
Morais left for the United States in 2004 to attend Community Christian School in Stockbridge, Georgia. He had the option to play college basketball after, but chose to sign a professional contract.

== Professional career ==
=== Angola (2001–2016) ===
Morais started his professional career with Angolan powerhouse Petro de Luanda.

=== Toronto Raptors (2013) ===
On September 19, 2013, Morais signed a non-guaranteed contract with the Toronto Raptors. He was later waived by the Raptors on October 26. He played in three pre-season games with Toronto and totalled 6 points in 21 minutes.

=== Benfica (2016–2018) ===
In 2016, Morais signed a two-year deal with Portuguese side Benfica. He played in the Liga Portuguesa de Basquetebol (LPB) and was named an All-Star in two consecutive seasons (in 2017 and 2018). Morais also guided Benfica to the Portuguese Cup title and was named MVP of the tournament in 2017.

=== Mens Sana Siena (2018–2019) ===
On July 22, 2018, Morais signed with Italian club Mens Sana of the second level Serie A2. In March 2019, the team was dismantled and excluded from the Series A2 due to economic issues.

=== Return to Angola (2019–2024) ===
On February 25, 2019, Morais returned to Petro de Luanda for a third stint with the team.

In the 2021–22 season, Morais won the national treble with Angola winning the league, cup and supercut competitions. They also reached the 2022 BAL Finals where they lost to US Monastir. Morais was selected to the All-BAL First Team for the first time.

=== Interclube (2025–present) ===
In January 2025, Morais signed with Interclube, leaving Petro de Luanda after his 22-year tenure with the team.

== National team career ==
Morais has been a member of the Angola national basketball team. He played for his country at the 2008 Olympics in Beijing. He has won four AfroBasket gold medals with Angola, in 2005, 2007, 2019 and 2013.

He has also played at the 2008 Summer Olympics, where Morais faced the United States roster, which included all-time legends Kobe Bryant and LeBron James.

== Achievements ==
Petro de Luanda

- 10× Angolan Basketball League: (2008, 2009, 2011, 2013, 2014, 2019, 2021, 2022, 2023, 2024)
- 3× Taça de Angola: (2007, 2022, 2023)
- 1× Basketball Africa League: (2024)
  - Runners-up: (2022)
  - Third place: (2021)

Benfica

- Liga Portuguesa de Basquetebol: (2017)
- Portuguese Basketball Cup: (2017)
- Portuguese Basketball Super Cup: (2017)

=== Individual awards ===
- 4× Angolan Basketball League top scorer: (2011, 2013, 2016, 2021)
- 3× FIBA Africa Clubs Champions Cup All-Star Team: (2011, 2012, 2015)
- FIBA Africa Clubs Champions Cup MVP: (2012)
- FIBA Africa Clubs Champions Cup scoring champion: (2012)
- AfroBasket MVP: (2013)
- 2× Portuguese League All-Star: (2017, 2018)
- Portuguese Cup MVP: (2017)
- LPB Import Player of the Year: (2017)
- All-BAL First Team: (2022)

== BAL career statistics ==
Legend
GP	Games played	GS	Games started	MPG	Minutes per game
FG%	Field goal percentage	3P%	3-point field goal percentage	FT%	Free throw percentage
RPG	Rebounds per game	APG	Assists per game	SPG	Steals per game
BPG	Blocks per game	PPG	Points per game	**Bold**	Career high
†	Won an BAL championship

Year	Team	GP	GS	MPG	FG%	3P%	FT%	RPG	APG	SPG	BPG	PPG
2021	Petro de Luanda	6	6	26.0	.343	.341	.700	3.8	1.5	1.3	.0	11.5
2022	Petro de Luanda	8	8	27.8	.344	.317	.667	3.9	3.2	1.4	.1	13.1
2023	Petro de Luanda	8	8	27.5	.442	.419	.789	4.4	3.1	.8	.0	15.6
2024†	Petro de Luanda	8	5	19.7	.286	.263	.722	3.4	2.3	0.6	0.1	6.9
