= José Neto (basketball) =

Brazilian professional basketball coach

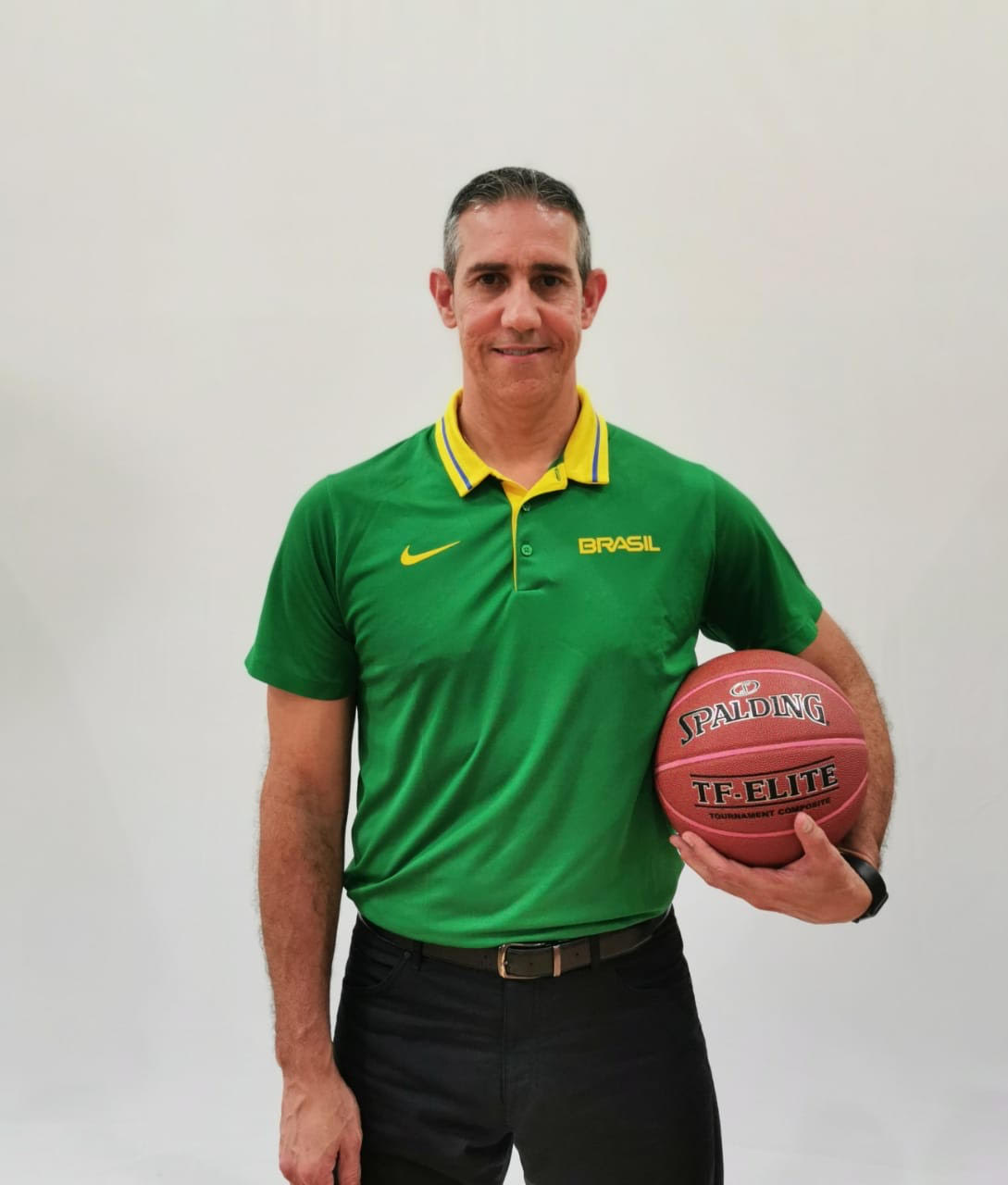
- Neto in November 2019

Fuerza Regia de Monterrey
- Position: Head coach
- League: LNBP

Personal information
- Born: 16 March 1971 (age 55) Itapetininga, Brazil

Career information
- College: University of São Paulo
- Coaching career: 2002–present

Career history

Coaching
- 2002–2007: Paulistano
- 2005–present: Brazil (Assistant)
- 2006: Brazil Under-18
- 2007: Brazil Under-16
- 2007, 2011: Brazil Under-19
- 2007–2008: São Bernardo
- 2010–2011: Palmeiras
- 2011–2012: Joinville
- 2012–2018: Flamengo
- 2013: Brazil National University Team
- 2014: Brazil (men)
- 2018–2020: Levanga Hokkaido
- 2020–2024: Petro de Luanda
- 2019–present: Brazil (women)
- 2026: Selenge Bodons
- 2026–present: Fuerza Regia de Monterrey

Career highlights
- As head coach: BAL Coach of the Year (2022); FIBA Intercontinental Cup champion (2014); FIBA Americas League champion (2014); 4× NBB champion (2013, 2014, 2015, 2016); NBB Coach of the Year (2016); 3× Angolan League champion (2021–2023); 2× Angolan Cup winner (2022, 2023); 4× Angolan Super Cup winner (2020, 2021, 2022, 2023); 3× Angolan League Coach of the Year (2021–2023)

José Alves dos Santos Neto (born 16 March 1971) is a Brazilian professional basketball coach. He is currently the head coach for the Brazil women's national basketball team, and Selenge Bodons in the Mongolian Basketball League.

== Coaching career ==
=== Pro clubs ===
Neto has been the head coach of the Brazilian League club Flamengo. As the head coach of Flamengo, he won the 2014 FIBA Americas League championship, and the 2014 FIBA Intercontinental Cup.

==== Petro de Luanda (2020–2024) ====
In September 2020, Neto signed as head coach of Petro de Luanda of the Angolan Basketball League and Basketball Africa League. He won the 2021 Angolan League title in his first season, and guided Petro to the third place in the 2022 BAL season.

In the 2021–22 season, Neto and Petro won the triple crown in Angola as they won all three competitions (the Angolan League, Cup and Supercup). He guided Petro to the 2022 BAL Finals where his team lost to US Monastir. On 27 May 2022, one day before the final, he was given the BAL Coach of the Year award.

In 2023, Neto won the Angolan Cup once again with Petro. In April, he won his third consecutive Angolan League championship and was named Coach of the Year once again.

Neto was sacked by Petro de Luanda on 21 March 2024. He guided Petro to three league championships, two cup titles, four supercup titles and one BAL final.

=== National teams ===
Neto has also been involved with the senior men's Brazil national basketball team, which he has served as a head coach and assistant coach.

== Head coaching record ==
Legend
Regular season	G	Games coached	W	Games won	L	Games lost	W–L %	Win–loss %
Playoffs	PG	Playoff games	PW	Playoff wins	PL	Playoff losses	PW–L %	Playoff win–loss %

Team	Year	G	W	L	W–L%	Finish	PG	PW	PL	PW–L%	Result
Levanga Hokkaido	2018–19	19	4	15	.211	Fired	–	–	–	–	–
Petro de Luanda	2021	3	3	0	1.000	1st in Group B	3	2	1	.667	Third Place
Petro de Luanda	2022	4	4	1	.800	2nd in Nile Conference	3	2	1	.667	Lost in BAL Finals
Petro de Luanda	2023	5	5	0	1.000	1st in Nile Conference	3	1	2	.333	Fourth Place
Petro de Luanda	2024	4	2	2	.500	2nd in Kalahari Conference	–	–	–	–	Sacked before playoffs
