= 2020–21 Angolan Basketball League =

- Season: 2020–21
- Teams: 9

Regular season
- BAL: Petro de Luanda
- Season MVP: Aboubakar Gakou (Petro de Luanda)

Finals
- Champions: Petro de Luanda (14th title)
- Runners-up: Interclube

Awards
- Regular Season MVP: Jilson Bango (Primeiro de Agosto)

The 2020–21 Angolan Basketball League was the 43rd season of the Angolan Basketball League, the highest premier basketball league in Angola. It was the first season after the previous season was cancelled due to the COVID-19 pandemic. Petro de Luanda won its 14th championship.

== Teams ==
Jesus Cristo and the second teams of Petro de Luanda and Primeiro de Agosto entered the league for the first time.

Club	Location	Venue	Capacity
ASA	Luanda	Pavilhão da Cidadela	6,873
Jesus Cristo			
Interclube	Luanda	Pavilhão 28 de Fevereiro	700
Marinha	Luanda	Pavilhão Victorino Cunha	2,000
Petro de Luanda	Luanda	Pavilhão da Cidadela	6,873
Petro de Luanda B	Luanda	Pavilhão da Cidadela	6,873
Primeiro de Agosto	Luanda	Pavilhão Victorino Cunha	1,500
Primeiro de Agosto B	Luanda	Pavilhão Victorino Cunha	1,500
Universidade Lusíada	Luanda	Pavilhão Anexo	1,500
Vila Clotilde	Luanda	Pavilhão Anexo	1,500
Kwanza	Luanda	Pavilhão Victorino Cunha	1,500

== Regular season ==
Pos	Team	Pld	W	L	Qualification or relegation
1	Petro de Luanda	8	8	0	Qualification to playoffs
2	Interclube	8	7	1	Qualification to playoffs
3	Primeiro de Agosto	8	6	2	Qualification to playoffs
4	Primeiro de Agosto B	8	4	4	Qualification to playoffs
5	Petro de Luanda B	8	4	4	
6	Vila Clotilde	8	3	5	
7	Vila Clotilde B	8	2	6	
8	Kwanza	8	2	6	
9	Jesus Cristo	8	0	8	

Source: Afrobasket.com

== Playoffs ==
=== Bracket ===
Semifinals
1 Petro de Luanda	2
4 Primeiro de Agosto B	0
2 Interclube	2
3 Primeiro de Agosto	1

Finals
1 Petro de Luanda	3
2 Interclube	0

=== Semifinals ===
The semifinals were played on 13 April, 15 April and 17 April 2022.

Team 1	Series	Team 2	Game 1	Game 2	Game 3
Petro de Luanda	2–0	Primeiro de Agosto B	90–53	123–55	
Interclube	2–1	Primeiro de Agosto	77–78	76–69	100–96

=== Finals ===
The finals were played on 20 April, 22 April and 24 April 2022.

Team 1	Series	Team 2	Game 1	Game 2	Game 3	Game 4	Game 5
Petro de Luanda	3–0	Interclube	92–71	104–65	97–89		

== Individual awards ==
Category	Player	Team	Ref.
MVP	Aboubakar Gakou	Petro de Luanda	
Regular Season MVP	Jilson Bango	Primeiro de Agosto	
Best Coach	José Neto	Petro de Luanda	
Top Scorer	Carlos Morais	Petro de Luanda	
Best Rebounder	Jilson Bango	Primeiro de Agosto	
Best Assists	Elmer Felix	Interclube	
Best Two Point Scorer	Leonel Paulo	Petro de Luanda	
Best Three Point Scorer	Carlos Morais	Petro de Luanda	
Best Free Throw Scorer	Glofate Buiamba	Interclube	
Fair Play Player	Joseney Joaquim	Interclube	

== Statistics ==
Category	Player	Team(s)	Statistic
Points per game	Miguel Maconda	Jesus Cristo	18.3
Rebounds per game	Clesio Castro	Primeiro de Agosto B	11.0
Assists per game	Elmer Felix	Interclube	5.9
