= 2023–24 Angolan Basketball League =

- League: Angolan Basketball League
- Sport: Basketball
- Duration: 21 October 2023 – 12 May 2024
- Number of teams: 12

Regular season
- Season MVP: Childe Dundão (Petro de Luanda)
- Top scorer: Elcane Paca (Primeiro de Agosto)

Finals
- Champions: Petro de Luanda (15th title)
- Runners-up: Interclube

Seasons
- ← 2022–23 2024–25 →

The 2023–24 Angolan Basketball League (known as Unitel Basket for sponsorship reasons) is the 46th season of the Angolan Basketball League, the highest level men's basketball league in Angola. The competition began on 21 October 2023 and finished on 12 May 2024.

Petro de Luanda successfully defended its title and won its fifth consecutive league championship, and their fifteenth in club history.

== Teams ==
ASA remained in the league, despite ongoing financial difficulties. Primeiro de Agosto B did not return for the 2023–24 season, which decreased the number of teams to 12.

Nine teams from the Luanda Province, two teams from the Benguela Province and one team from the Uíge Province (namely Akiras Academy), participated.

Club	Location
Akiras Academy	Uíge
ASA	Luanda
Clube Amigos de Benguela	Benguela
CPPL	Lobito
Jesus Cristo	Viana
Interclube	Luanda (Rocha Pinto)
Interclube B	Luanda (Rocha Pinto)
Petro de Luanda	Luanda (Eixo Viário)
Petro de Luanda B	Luanda (Eixo Viário)
Primeiro de Agosto	Luanda
Vila Clotilde	Luanda (Maculusso)
Desportivo Kwanza	Luanda

== Regular season ==
The regular season schedule was determined with a draw which was held in Lobito on 21 October 2023.

=== Standings ===
[data missing]

Pos	Team	Pld	W	L	PF	PA	PD	Pts	Qualification or relegation
1	Petro de Luanda	22	21	1	2406	1531	+875	43	Qualification to quarterfinals
2	Primeiro de Agosto	21	18	3	2108	1634	+474	39	Qualification to quarterfinals
3	Interclube	22	18	4	2278	1789	+489	40	Qualification to quarterfinals
4	CPPL	20	14	6	1841	1441	+400	34	Qualification to quarterfinals
5	FC Vila Clotilde	22	14	8	1993	1815	+178	36	Qualification to quarter-finals qualifiers
6	Petro de Luanda B	22	10	12	1804	1838	−34	32	Qualification to quarter-finals qualifiers
7	Interclube B	20	9	11	1581	1617	−36	29	Qualification to quarter-finals qualifiers
8	Jesus Cristo	21	8	13	1732	1991	−259	29	Qualification to quarter-finals qualifiers
9	ASA	21	7	14	1716	1961	−245	28	Qualification to quarter-finals qualifiers
10	Clube Amigos de Benguela	20	4	16	1422	1998	−576	24	Qualification to quarter-finals qualifiers
11	Akiras Academy	20	3	17	1461	1907	−446	23	Qualification to quarter-finals qualifiers
12	CD Kwanza	21	0	21	1550	2370	−820	21	Qualification to quarter-finals qualifiers

Source: Afrobasket

=== Results ===
Home \ Away	AKI	ASA	CAB	CPPL	JCB	INT	INB	APL	APB	AGO	FVC	KWA
Akiras Academy	—	86–94	72–91	57–82	77–95	80–129	66–64	49–129	–	–	66–95	111–95
ASA	82–78	—	86–89	74–114	96–100	95–96	102–85	71–93	81–96	81–102	53–76	92–82
Clube Amigos de Benguela	20–0	78–81	—	54–105	94–95	–	20–0	51–130	73–95	59–94	73–120	91–82
CPPL	104–62	93–61	109–64	—	114–63	84–91	–	62–100	89–73	84–91	107–62	113–46
Jesus Cristo	98–83	87–96	85–81	–	—	95–106	67–87	74–104	87–89	65–110	100–116	105–59
Interclube	111–53	111–90	118–50	85–70	112–80	—	103–89	102–108	107–77	99–95	86–91	136–67
Interclube B	67–51	101–95	5 Feb.	–	93–75	68–103	—	74–84	79–55	60–88	78–79	85–72
Petro de Luanda	94–52	119–74	129–39	108–71	119–45	104–76	–	—	132–97	110–97	86–88	151–61
Petro de Luanda B	85–62	76–77	89–66	72–79	76–74	77–86	79–71	57–114	—	77–86	81–70	93–60
Primeiro de Agosto	118–64	108–65	109–46	95–90	97–79	101–88	102–78	81–83	90–79	—	110–99	131–86
Vila Clotilde	97–93	91–70	121–98	67–77	96–62	85–100	78–89	75–82	78–71	82–84	—	91–56
CD Kwanza	–	–	100–103	55–120	88–97	67–119	–	67–130	90–113	58–119	93–136	—

Source: FAB
Legend: Blue = home team win; Red = away team win.

== Playoffs ==
The playoffs included one more round this year as the 5th to 12th ranked teams played a qualification for the quarter-final spots. The qualification for the quarter-finals were played on 15 March 2024.

Qualification for quarter-finals
7	Interclube B	20
10	Jesus Cristo	0
5	FC Vila Clotilde	20
12	CD Kwanza	0
6	Petro de Luanda B	99
11	Akiras Academy	81
8	ASA	20
9	CAB	0

Quarter-finals
1	Petro de Luanda	2
7	Interclube B	0
4	CPPL	2
5	FC Vila Clotilde	0
2	Primeiro de Agosto	2
6	Petro de Luanda B	0
3	Interclube	2
9	ASA	0

Semi-finals
1	Petro de Luanda	2
4	CPPL	0
2	Primeiro de Agosto	0
3	Interclube	2

Final
1	Petro de Luanda	3
2	Interclube	1

== Individual awards ==
The individual award winners were announced after the final game on 12 May 2024.

Award	Player	Team
MVP	Childe Dundão	Petro de Luanda
Regular Season MVP	Aboubakar Gakou	Petro de Luanda
Best Three-Point Shooter	Elmer Felix	Interclube
Top Scorer	Valdemar Avelino	Vila Clotilde
Best Ballhandler	Aboubakar Gakou	Petro de Luanda
Best Fair Play Athlete	João Oliveira	CPPL
Best Coach	Sérgio Moreno	Petro de Luanda
