= List of BAL finals =

BAL Finals
- Organising body: Basketball Africa League
- Founded: 2021
- First season: 2021
- Number of teams: 2
- International cup: FIBA Intercontinental Cup
- Current champions: (Rwanda) RSSB Tigers (1st title) (2026)
- Most championships: 6 teams (1 title each)
- Website: thebal.com
- 2026 BAL Finals

The Basketball Africa League (BAL) is a seasonal basketball league established in 2019 and first held in 2021. The league is a joint venture by the National Basketball Association (NBA) and FIBA, and is open to national champions of FIBA Africa member countries. The finals of each season are played in a single-game format, which is held at an arena that is chosen by the BAL organisation. The winner automatically qualifies for that year's FIBA Intercontinental Cup.

The data below does not include the FIBA Africa Club Champions Cup, the predecessor of the BAL that was held between 1972 and 2019.

Zamalek won the inaugural final in 2021. Six different teams have won the BAL championship so far. Egyptian teams have won the competition the most times with two wins. Al Ahli Tripoli is the only team that has started from the Road to BAL qualifiers to have won the finals.

== Champions ==
The first parentheses in the champions and runners-up columns indicate the teams' playoff seed. The second parentheses indicate the number of times that teams have appeared in an BAL Finals as well as each respective team's BAL Finals record to date.

| Season | Year | Champions | Coach | Result | Runners-up | Coach | Arena | Attendance | Reference |
|---|---|---|---|---|---|---|---|---|---|
| 1 | 2021 | (Egypt) Zamalek (2) (1, 1–0) | Augustí Julbe | 76–63 | (Tunisia) US Monastir (1) (1, 0–1) | Mounir Ben Slimane | Kigali Arena, Kigali, Rwanda | 1,789 (Note: The attendance in the 2021 finals was limited due to government regulations regarding the COVID-19 pandemic, as social distancing was enforced.) | |
| 2 | 2022 | (Tunisia) US Monastir (2) (2, 1–1) | Miodrag Perišić | 83–72 | (Angola) Petro de Luanda (2) (1, 0–1) | José Neto | BK Arena, Kigali, Rwanda (2) | 10,000 | |
| 3 | 2023 | (Egypt) Al Ahly (2) (1, 1–0) | Augustí Julbe | 80–65 | (Senegal) AS Douanes (2) (1, 0–1) | Pabi Gueye | BK Arena, Kigali, Rwanda (3) | 7,532 | |
| 4 | 2024 | (Angola) Petro de Luanda (6) (2, 1–1) | Sergio Valdeolmillos | 107–94 | (Libya) Al Ahly Ly (7) (1, 0–1) | Ivan Jeremić | BK Arena, Kigali, Rwanda (4) | 6,404 | |
| 5 | 2025 | (Libya) Al Ahli Tripoli (2) (1, 1–0) | Fouad Abou Chakra | 88–67 | (Angola) Petro de Luanda (6) (3, 1–2) | Sergio Valdeolmillos | SunBet Arena, Pretoria, South Africa | 6,853 | |
| 6 | 2026 | (Rwanda) RSSB Tigers (3) (1, 1–0) | Henry Mwinuka | 90–88 | (Angola) Petro de Luanda (1) (4, 1–3) | Sergio Valdeolmillos | BK Arena, Kigali, Rwanda (5) | 6,629 | |

== Performances ==
Location of BAL champions.

=== Performance by club ===
Performances in the Basketball Africa League (BAL) by club
| Club | Titles | Runners-up | Years won | Years runners-up |
|---|---|---|---|---|
| (Angola) Petro de Luanda | 1 | 3 | 2024 | 2022, 2025, 2026 |
| (Tunisia) US Monastir | 1 | 1 | 2022 | 2021 |
| (Rwanda) RSSB Tigers | 1 | 0 | 2026 | — |
| (Libya) Al Ahli Tripoli | 1 | 0 | 2025 | — |
| (Egypt) Al Ahly | 1 | 0 | 2023 | — |
| (Egypt) Zamalek | 1 | 0 | 2021 | — |
| (Senegal) AS Douanes | 0 | 1 | — | 2023 |
| (Libya) Al Ahly Ly | 0 | 1 | — | 2024 |

=== Performance by country ===
Teams from six nations have been to a BAL final, and teams from five countries have won the competition thus far.

Performances in finals by nation
| Nation | Titles | Runners-up | Total |
|---|---|---|---|
| Angola | 1 | 3 | 4 |
| Egypt | 2 | 0 | 2 |
| Libya | 1 | 1 | 2 |
| Tunisia | 1 | 1 | 2 |
| Rwanda | 1 | 0 | 1 |
| Senegal | 0 | 1 | 1 |

=== Performance by head coach ===
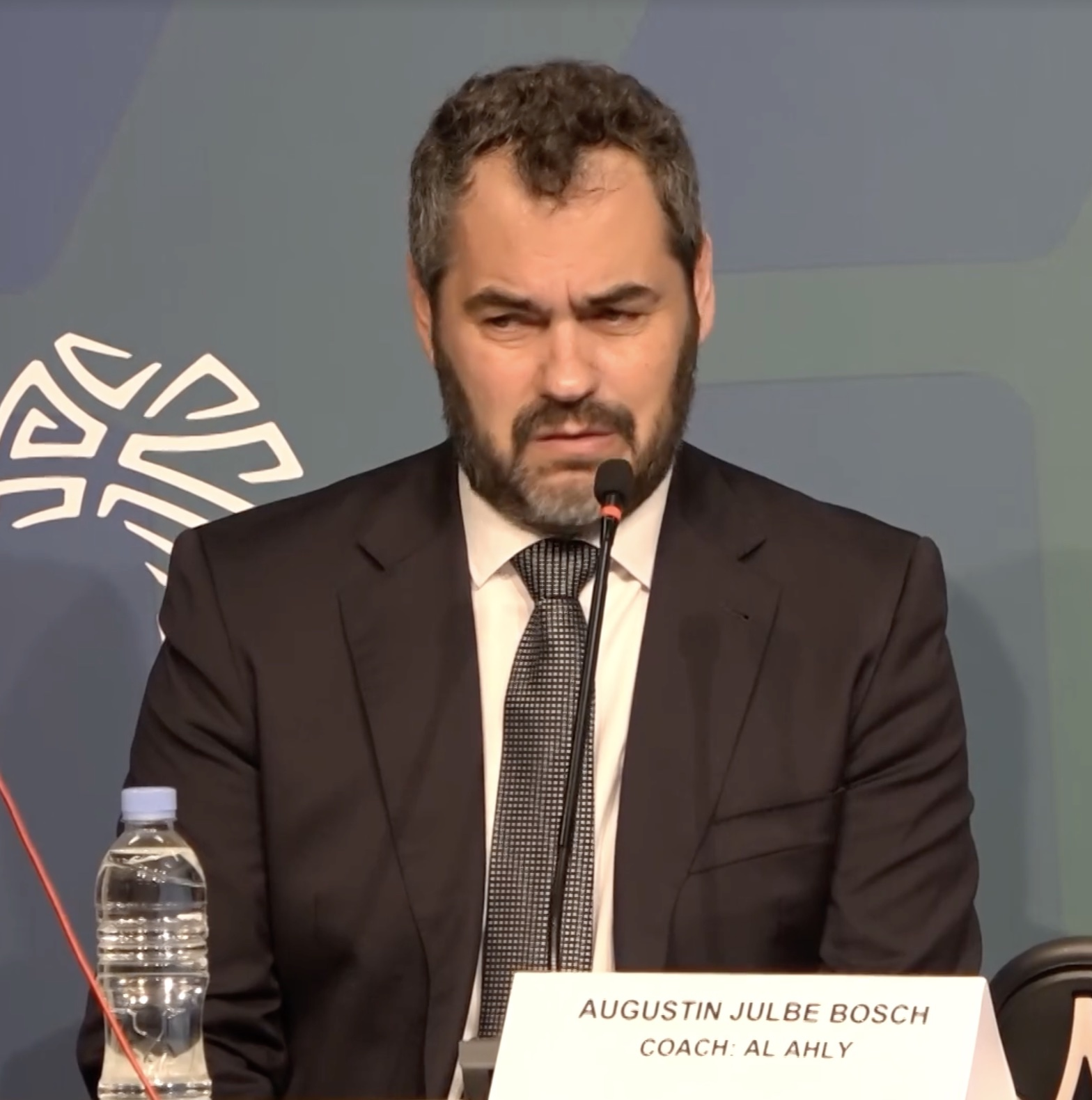
Augustí Julbe is the only coach to have won two BAL titles

| Club | Titles | Runners-up | Years won | Years runners-up |
|---|---|---|---|---|
| (Spain) Augustí Julbe | 2 | 0 | 2021, 2023 | — |
| (Spain) Sergio Valdeolmillos | 1 | 2 | 2024 | 2025, 2026 |
| (Tanzania) Henry Mwinuka | 1 | 0 | 2026 | — |
| (Lebanon) Fouad Abou Chakra | 1 | 0 | 2025 | — |
| (Serbia) Miodrag Perišić | 1 | 0 | 2022 | — |
| (Tunisia) Mounir Ben Slimane | 0 | 1 | — | 2021 |
| (Brazil) José Neto | 0 | 1 | — | 2022 |
| (Senegal) Pabi Guèye | 0 | 1 | — | 2023 |
| (Serbia) Ivan Jeremić | 0 | 1 | — | 2024 |

== Finals hosted by arena ==
The finals are played in a pre-determined venue, from 2021 to 2023 this was the BK Arena (formerly the Kigali Arena) in Kigali as the BAL agreed with the Rwandan Ministry of Sports. Later, the BAL and the Rwanda Development Board (RDB) agreed to host the finals of 2024, 2026 and 2028 as well.

| Arena | Location | Finals | Years |
|---|---|---|---|
| BK Arena (Note: The BK Arena was known as Kigali Arena until 2021.) | Kigali, Rwanda | 6 | 2021, 2022, 2023, 2024, 2026, 2028 |
| SunBet Arena | Pretoria, South Africa | 1 | 2025 |

== Top scorer ==
Clubs denoted in italics and an asterisk lost the finals in the given year.

Top scorers in the final of the Basketball Africa League by year
| Year | Top scorer | Club | Points | Ref. |
|---|---|---|---|---|
| 2021 | (Nigeria) Michael Fakuade | (Egypt) Zamalek | 15 | |
| 2022 | (Angola) Gerson Gonçalves | (Angola) Petro de Luanda* | 28 | |
| 2023 | (South Sudan) Nuni Omot | (Egypt) Al Ahly | 22 | |
| 2024 | (United States) Nick Faust | (Angola) Petro de Luanda | 24 | |
| 2024 | (South Sudan) Majok Deng | (Libya) Al Ahly Ly* | 24 | |
| 2025 | (Egypt) Assem Marei | (Libya) Al Ahli Tripoli | 22 | |
| 2026 | (United States) Craig Randall II | (Rwanda) RSSB Tigers | 33 | |

== Players with multiple BAL titles ==
| No. of championships | Player | Position | Seasons | | Championship teams | Ref. |
| No. of championships | Player | Position | Played | Winning Percentage | Championship teams | Ref. |
|---|---|---|---|---|---|---|
| 2 | (Ivory Coast) Solo Diabate | G | 4 | 50% | Zamalek (2021); US Monastir (2022) | |
| 2 | (Nigeria) Michael Fakuade | F | 2 | 100% | Zamalek (2021); Al Ahly (2023) | |
