= 2022–23 Division Excellence =

83rd season of the Division Excellence

- Sport: Basketball
- Duration: 9 October 2022 – 4 July 2023
- Number of teams: 14

Regular season
- Top seed: FUS Rabat
- Season MVP: Abdelhakim Zouita (FUS Rabat)

Playoffs
- Finals champions: FUS Rabat (18th title)
- Runners-up: MTB Majd Tanger

Seasons
- ← 2022–23 2023–24 →

The 2022-23 Division Excellence was the 83rd season of the Division Excellence (DEX-H), the top-level basketball league in Morocco. The season began on and ended on 9 October 2022 with the regular season and ended on 4 July 2023 with the last game of the finals.

FUS Rabat won its 18th national championship, ending a 19-year drought.

== Regular season ==
The regular season was decreased from 13 to 12 teams.

Pos	Team	Pld	W	L	GF	GA	GD	Pts	Qualification
1	FUS Rabat	20	16	4	1629	1318	+311	36	Advance to playoffs
2	MTB Majd Tanger	20	14	6	1531	1390	+141	34	Advance to playoffs
3	AS Salé	20	13	7	1499	1259	+240	33	Advance to playoffs
4	AS FAR	20	12	8	1408	1325	+83	32	Advance to playoffs
5	IRT Ittihad Tanger	20	12	8	1448	1374	+74	32	Advance to playoffs
6	MAS Fes	20	11	9	1463	1447	+16	31	Advance to playoffs
7	KAC Marrakech	20	10	10	1571	1520	+51	30	Advance to playoffs
8	Wydad AC	20	8	12	1280	1317	−37	28	Advance to playoffs
9	Raja CA	20	8	12	1480	1496	−16	28	
10	AS Lixus Larache	20	6	14	1346	1436	−90	26	
11	Olympique Youssoufia (R)	20	0	20	1019	1792	−773	20	Relegated to National Division 1
12	Athletic Beni Snassen (R)	0	0	0	0	0	0	0	Relegated to National Division 1
13	Chabab Rif Al Hoceima (R)	0	0	0	0	0	0	0	Relegated to National Division 1
14	Areh Hajeb (R)	0	0	0	0	0	0	0	Relegated to National Division 1

Source: FRMBB
(R) Relegated

== Playoffs ==
=== Group 1 ===
Pos	Team	Pld	W	L	GF	GA	GD	Pts
1	FUS Rabat	6	5	1	479	398	+81	11
2	Wydad AC	6	4	2	394	403	−9	10
3	MAS Fes	6	2	4	448	470	−22	8
4	AS FAR	6	1	5	413	463	−50	7

Source: FRMBB

=== Group 2 ===
Pos	Team	Pld	W	L	GF	GA	GD	Pts
1	MTB Majd Tanger	6	3	3	378	352	+26	9
2	IRT Ittihad Tanger	6	3	3	403	404	−1	9
3	AS Salé	6	4	2	423	376	+47	10
4	KAC Marrakech	6	2	4	458	530	−72	8

Source: FRMBB

== Finals ==
The finals began on 5 June and ended 4 July 2023. Teams in italic had home court advantage.

Semi-finals
FUS Rabat	2
IRT Ittihad Tanger	1
MTB Majd Tanger	2
Wydad AC	1

Final
FUS Rabat	3
MTB Majd Tanger	1
Third place
IRT Ittihad Tanger	80
Wydad AC	60

== Individual awards ==
- Most Valuable Player: Abdelhakim Zouita, FUS Rabat
