= 2023–24 Division Excellence =

84th season of the Division Excellence

- Sport: Basketball
- Duration: 30 September 2023 – 10 July 2023
- Number of teams: 12

Regular season

Playoffs
- Finals champions: FUS Rabat (19th title)
- Runners-up: AS Salé

Seasons
- ← 2022–23 2024–25 →

The 2023–24 Division Excellence was the 84th season of the Division Excellence (DEX-H), the top-level basketball league in Morocco. The season began on 30 September 2023 with the regular season and ended with the final game of the finals on 10 July 2024.

FUS Rabat won its 19th national title and its second consecutive one, after defeating AS Salé in the finals of the playoffs.

== Teams ==
The number of teams was reduced from fourteen to twelve.

=== Changes ===
| ▲ Promoted from 2022-23 1NDH | ▼ Relegated from 2022–23 Division Excellence |
|---|---|
| ASCEBB; Amal Al Hoceima | Areh Hajeb; Athletic Bnei Snassen; Chabab Rif Al Hoceima; Olympique Youssoufia |

== Regular season ==
| Pos | Team | Pld | W | L | GF | GA | GD | Pts | Qualification or relegation |
|---|---|---|---|---|---|---|---|---|---|
| 1 | FUS Rabat | 22 | 20 | 2 | 1799 | 1440 | +359 | 42 | Advance to playoffs |
| 2 | AS Salé | 22 | 17 | 5 | 1801 | 1521 | +280 | 39 | Advance to playoffs |
| 3 | MAS Fes | 22 | 16 | 6 | 1522 | 1327 | +195 | 38 | Advance to playoffs |
| 4 | IRT Ittihad Tanger | 22 | 16 | 6 | 1609 | 1450 | +159 | 38 | Advance to playoffs |
| 5 | Wydad AC | 22 | 13 | 9 | 1273 | 1276 | −3 | 35 | Advance to playoffs |
| 6 | ASCEBB | 22 | 9 | 13 | 1437 | 1555 | −118 | 31 | Advance to playoffs |
| 7 | AS FAR | 22 | 8 | 14 | 1377 | 1445 | −68 | 30 | Advance to playoffs |
| 8 | MTB Majd Tanger | 22 | 9 | 13 | 1441 | 1533 | −92 | 31 | Advance to playoffs |
| 9 | ASLL | 22 | 9 | 13 | 1437 | 1501 | −64 | 31 | |
| 10 | KACM | 22 | 6 | 16 | 1483 | 1666 | −183 | 28 | |
| 11 | Raja CA | 22 | 5 | 17 | 1393 | 1594 | −201 | 27 | Relegated to Division 1 |
| 12 | ASA | 22 | 4 | 18 | 1497 | 1761 | −264 | 26 | Relegated to Division 1 |

Source: FRMBB

== Playoffs ==
=== Group 1 ===
| Pos | Team | Pld | W | L | GF | GA | GD | Pts | Qualification or relegation |
|---|---|---|---|---|---|---|---|---|---|
| 1 | FUS Rabat | 6 | 6 | 0 | 539 | 423 | +116 | 12 | Advance to final round |
| 2 | IRT Ittihad Tanger | 6 | 4 | 2 | 487 | 433 | +54 | 10 | Advance to final round |
| 3 | ASCEBB | 6 | 1 | 5 | 404 | 478 | −74 | 7 | |
| 4 | MTB Majd Tanger | 6 | 1 | 5 | 408 | 504 | −96 | 7 | |

Source: FRMBB

=== Group 2 ===
| Pos | Team | Pld | W | L | GF | GA | GD | Pts | Qualification or relegation |
|---|---|---|---|---|---|---|---|---|---|
| 1 | AS Salé | 6 | 4 | 2 | 420 | 368 | +52 | 10 | Advance to final round |
| 2 | MAS Fes | 6 | 4 | 2 | 409 | 371 | +38 | 10 | Advance to final round |
| 3 | Wydad AC | 6 | 4 | 2 | 342 | 333 | +9 | 10 | |
| 4 | AS FAR | 6 | 0 | 6 | 326 | 425 | −99 | 6 | |

Source: FRMBB

== Final round ==
Semifinals | Finals
A1 | FUS Rabat | 78 | 64 | 69 | 2
B2 | MAS Fes | 63 | 74 | 61 | 1
A1 | FUS Rabat | 82 | 67 | 79 | 79 | 3
B1 | AS Salé | 56 | 76 | 60 | 59 | 1
B1 | AS Salé | 75 | 91 | 82 | 2
A2 | IRT Ittihad Tanger | 77 | 85 | 72 | 1 | Third place
B2 | MAS Fes | 85 | 1
A2 | IRT Ittihad Tanger | 74 | 0
