= 2021–22 Division Excellence =

- Season: 2021–22
- Dates: 21 November 2021 – 30 June 2022
- Teams: 16

Regular season
- BAL: AS Salé

Finals
- Champions: AS Salé (9th title)
- Runners-up: FUS Rabat

The 2021–22 Division Excellence was the 85th season of the Division Excellence, the highest premier basketball league in Morocco. The defending champions were AS Salé.

The season started on 21 November 2021 and ended on 30 June 2022. Salé won the championship, their 9th title and their 7th in a row (not counting abandoned seasons).

== Teams ==
=== Team changes ===
▲ Promoted from 2020 to 2021 1NDH	▼ Relegated from 2020 to 2021 Division Excellence
Raja CA Majd Tanger Atletic Beni Snassen	Olympique de Safi Amal Riadi El Hajeb ASE Essaouira

Raja CA, Majd Tanger and Atletic Beni Snassen were promoted to the league. Olympique de Safi, Amal Riadi El Hajeb and ASE Essaouira were relegated from the previous season.

=== Arenas and locations ===
Team	City	Arena
Atletic Beni Snassen	Berkane	Salle Moulay El Hassan
AS Salé	Salé	Salle Bouazzaoui
Pomme de Midelt	Midelt	Salle de Midelt
FAR Rabat	Rabat	Salle Ibn Yassine
Raja CA	Casablanca	Salle Bouchentouf
Renaissance Berkane	Berkane	Salle Moulay El Hassan
Wydad AC	Casablanca	Salle WAC
Majd Tanger	Tanger	Salle Ziaten
MAS Fes	Fez	Salle 11 Janvier
FUS Rabat	Rabat	Salle Ibn Rochd
IRT Tanger	Tanger	Salle Ziaten
Lixus Larache	Larache	Salle Omnisports
Chabab Rif Al Hoceima	Al Hoceima	Salle 3 Mars
KACM	Marrakesh	Salle Zerktouni
AMI	Ifrane	Salle Omnisports de Ifrane
ASCEBB	Tantan	Salle Omnisports de Tantan

== Regular season ==
=== Group North ===
Pos	Team	Pld	W	L	GF	GA	GD	Pts	Qualification
1	IR Tanger	12	11	1	1058	762	+296	23	Advance to playoff round
2	Lixus Larache	12	9	3	922	718	+204	21	Advance to playoff round
3	MTB Majd Tanger	12	8	4	982	730	+252	20	Advance to playoff round
4	MAS Fes	12	7	5	933	793	+140	19	Advance to playoff round
5	Athletic Club Bni Yznasn	12	4	8	810	872	−62	16	Qualification for 9th place game
6	Chabab Rif Al Hoceima	12	3	9	770	865	−95	15	Qualification for 11th place game
7	Renaissance de Berkane (R)	12	0	12	509	1244	−735	12	Relegated to National Division 1
8	AMI (D)	0	0	0	0	0	0	0	Withdrew

Source: FRMBB
(D) Disqualified; (R) Relegated

=== Group South ===
Pos	Team	Pld	W	L	GF	GA	GD	Pts	Qualification
1	FUS Rabat	14	11	3	1105	891	+214	25	Advance to playoff round
2	AS Salé	14	11	3	1122	920	+202	25	Advance to playoff round
3	AS FAR	14	9	5	1056	867	+189	23	Advance to playoff round
4	Wydad AC	14	9	5	895	785	+110	23	Advance to playoff round
5	KACM	14	9	5	923	907	+16	23	Qualification for 9th place game
6	Raja CA	14	4	10	926	1041	−115	18	Qualification for 11th place game
7	ASCEBB (R)	14	2	12	740	1065	−325	16	Relegated to National Division 1
8	Pomme de Midelt (R)	14	1	13	770	1061	−291	15	Relegated to National Division 1

Source: FRMBB
(R) Relegated

== Playoff round ==
In the playoff round, the four highest-placed teams from each regular season group play each other in two groups. The top two teams from both groups advance to the semifinals.

=== Group A ===
Pos	Team	Pld	W	L	PF	PA	PD	Pts	Qualification	IRT	FAR	ASLL	KACM
1	IRT Tanger	6	5	1	444	409	+35	11	Advance to semifinals	—	65–57	77–67	75–52
2	FAR Rabat	6	4	2	409	379	+30	10	Advance to semifinals	80–64	—	79–63	89–60
3	Lixus Larache	6	3	3	449	431	+18	9	Qualify for 5th place game	79–86	72–45	—	77–59
4	KACM	6	0	6	385	468	−83	6	Qualify for 7th place game	74–77	55–59	85–91	—

Source: FRMBB
Legend: Blue = home team win; Red = away team win.

=== Group B ===
Pos	Team	Pld	W	L	PF	PA	PD	Pts	Qualification	ASS	FUS	MTB	MAS
1	AS Salé	6	5	1	512	440	+72	11	Advance to semifinals	—	85–75	90–63	97–82
2	FUS Rabat	6	4	2	500	469	+31	10	Advance to semifinals	76–66	—	85–87	88–79
3	Majd Tanger	6	2	4	406	471	−65	8	Qualify for 5th place game	56–82	59–80	—	74–64
4	Maghreb de Fes	6	1	5	476	514	−38	7	Qualify for 7th place game	88–92	93–96	70–67	—

Source: FRMBB
Legend: Blue = home team win; Red = away team win.

== Classification round ==
=== 5th and 6th place game ===
18 June 2022
17:00

Lixus Larache	69–65	Majd Tanger

Salle Omnisport, Larache

=== 7th and 8th place game ===
TBD

KACM	vs.	Maghreb de Fes

TBD

=== 9th and 10th place game ===
26 April 2022
22:00

Athletic Club Bni Yznasn	51–86	Wydad AC

Salle 11 Janvier, Fes

=== 11th and 12th place game ===
26 April 2022
22:00

Chabab Rif Al Hoceima	91–101	Raja CA

Salle 11 Janvier, Fes

== Semifinals and finals ==
The semifinals are played in a two-legged series, the finals are played in a best-of-three playoff format.

Semi-finals
IRT Ittihad Tanger	84	84	168
FUS Rabat	108	62	170
AS Salé	64	90	154
FAR	51	38	89

Final
FUS Rabat	0
AS Salé	2

=== Finals ===
27 June 2022
20:00

FUS Rabat	79–83	AS Salé

Salle Ibn Rochd, Rabat

29 June 2022
19:00

AS Salé	89–86	FUS Rabat

Salle Bouazaoui, Salé
