= Said El Bouzidi =

Moroccan basketball coach

FUS Rabat
- Position: Head coach
- League: Division Excellence

Personal information
- Born: 26 September 1967 (age 59)
- Coaching career: 2003–present

Career history

Coaching
- 2003–2004: ASS Rabat
- 2007–2008: Ittihad te Tanger
- 2008–2010: ASE Essaouira
- 2016–2018: AS Salé
- 2018–2019: US Monastir
- 2019–2021: AS Salé
- 2021–2022: Al Wehda Mecca
- 2022–2023: AS Salé
- 2023–present: FUS Rabat

Career highlights
- Tunisian League champion (2019); FIBA Africa Cup champion (2017); 4× Moroccan League champion (2017, 2018, 2021, 2022); 2× Moroccan Cup champion (2017, 2018)

Said El Bouzidi (born 26 September 1967) is a Moroccan basketball coach who is the current head coach of FUS Rabat.

Most of his coaching success has come with AS Salé, winning with the team three national league titles as well as the FIBA Africa Club Champions Cup in 2017.

== Career ==
In the 2018–19 season, El Bouzidi coached the Tunisian team US Monastir of the Championnat National A.

In October 2021, El Bouzidi took over Saudi club Al Wehda. After one season with AS Salé, he took over AS FAR in 2023.

== Awards and accomplishments ==
US Monastir

- Championnat National A: (2019)

AS Salé

- FIBA Africa Club Champions Cup: (2017)
- 4× Division Excellence: (2017, 2018, 2021, 2022)
- 2× Moroccan Throne Cup: (2017, 2018)
