= Željko Zečević =

Serbian basketball coach (born 1963)

AS Salé
- Position: Head coach
- League: Division Excellence

Personal information
- Born: October 21, 1963 (age 63) Belgrade, SR Serbia, Yugoslavia
- Coaching career: 1992–present

Career history

Coaching
- 1992–1993: KK Porec
- 1995–1997: Cantú (assistant)
- 1997–1999: La Maddalena Basket
- 2000: CUS Catania
- 2000–2002: Udine (juniors)
- 2001–2002: CUS Catania
- 2003–2004: Potenza
- 2004–2005: Udine (assistant)
- 2004–2005: Olimpia Melfi
- 2006–2008: Scafati (assistant)
- 2009: Egypt
- 2009–2010: Sagesse SC
- 2010–2011: Craiova
- 2010–2014: Wydad AC
- 2015–2017: Chabab Rif Al Hoceima
- 2017–2018: US Monastir
- 2018–2019: Al Hala
- 2019: AS Salé
- 2019–2023: SLAC
- 2021–present: Guinea
- 2023–present: AS Salé

Career highlights
- As head coach: Moroccan League champion (2013)

Željko Zečević (Serbian Cyrillic: Жељко Зечевић; born 21 October 1963) is a Serbian professional basketball coach, who is the current head coach of AS Salé of the Moroccan Division Excellence. He is also the head coach of the Guinea national team since 2021.

== Coaching career ==
Born in Belgrade, SR Serbia, SFR Yugoslavia (now Serbia), Zečević started coaching youth teams in 1988 in his hometown. He was scouted for his coaching potential by senior coaches at age 24.

From 2015 to 2017, he was the head coach of Chabab Rif Al Hoceima in the Moroccan Division Excellence.

In 2009, he left Italy to coach for Sagesse SC in Lebanon. In 2010, Zečević signed with Wydad AC, his first African club.

In 2019, Zečević signed as head coach of SLAC of the Guinean Ligue 1

For the 2023–24 season, he signed with AS Salé of the Moroccan Division Excellence, returning after four years for a second stint.

== National team coaching career ==
In February 2021, Zečević took over as head coach of the Guinea national team. He coached the team in the 2021 AfroBasket.

== Head coaching record ==
=== BAL ===
Legend
Regular season	G	Games coached	W	Games won	L	Games lost	W–L %	Win–loss %
Playoffs	PG	Playoff games	PW	Playoff wins	PL	Playoff losses	PW–L %	Playoff win–loss %

Team	Year	G	W	L	W–L%	Finish	PG	PW	PL	PW–L%	Result
SLAC	2022	5	2	3	.400	4th in Sahara Conference	1	0	1	.000	Lost in Quarterfinals
SLAC	2023	5	1	4	.200	5th in Sahara Conference	DNQ				
