= Brewster Academy =

Location
- Wolfeboro, New Hampshire; United States; 43°34′58″N 71°12′27″W

Information
- Type: Private; Independent; day; boarding; college-preparatory school
- Motto: Meus Dux Sit Veritas (Let truth be our leader)
- Religious affiliation: Nonsectarian
- Established: 1820; 206 years ago
- Chair of Trustees: R C Ballentine Esq
- Head of School: Kristy Kerin
- Staff: 714
- Employees: 468
- Gender: Co-educational
- Enrollment: 352
- Average class size: 12
- Student to teacher ratio: 6:1
- Campus: Lakeside; 80 acres (32 ha)
- Colors: Cardinal red Navy blue
- Athletics conference: Lakes Region League; New England Preparatory School Athletic Council
- Mascot: Bobcat
- Nickname: Bobcats
- Tuition: Boarding students: $80,800; Day students: $44,700 (2026-27)
- Website: www.brewsteracademy.org

Brewster Academy is a co-educational independent boarding school located on 80 acres (32 ha) in Wolfeboro, New Hampshire, United States. It occupies 0.5 miles (800 m) of shoreline along Lake Winnipesaukee. With around 350 students, it serves grades nine through twelve and post-graduates. The 2026-2027 full boarding tuition is $80,800. The current Head of School is Kristy Kerin.

== History ==
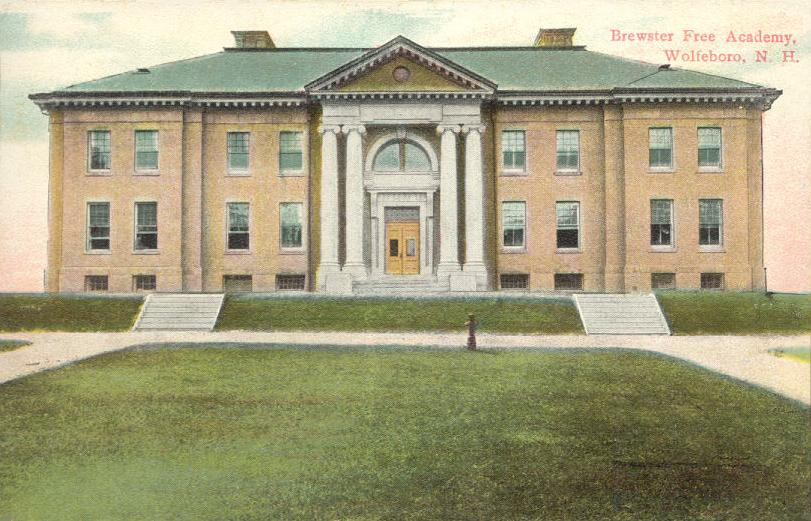
Brewster Academy in 1909

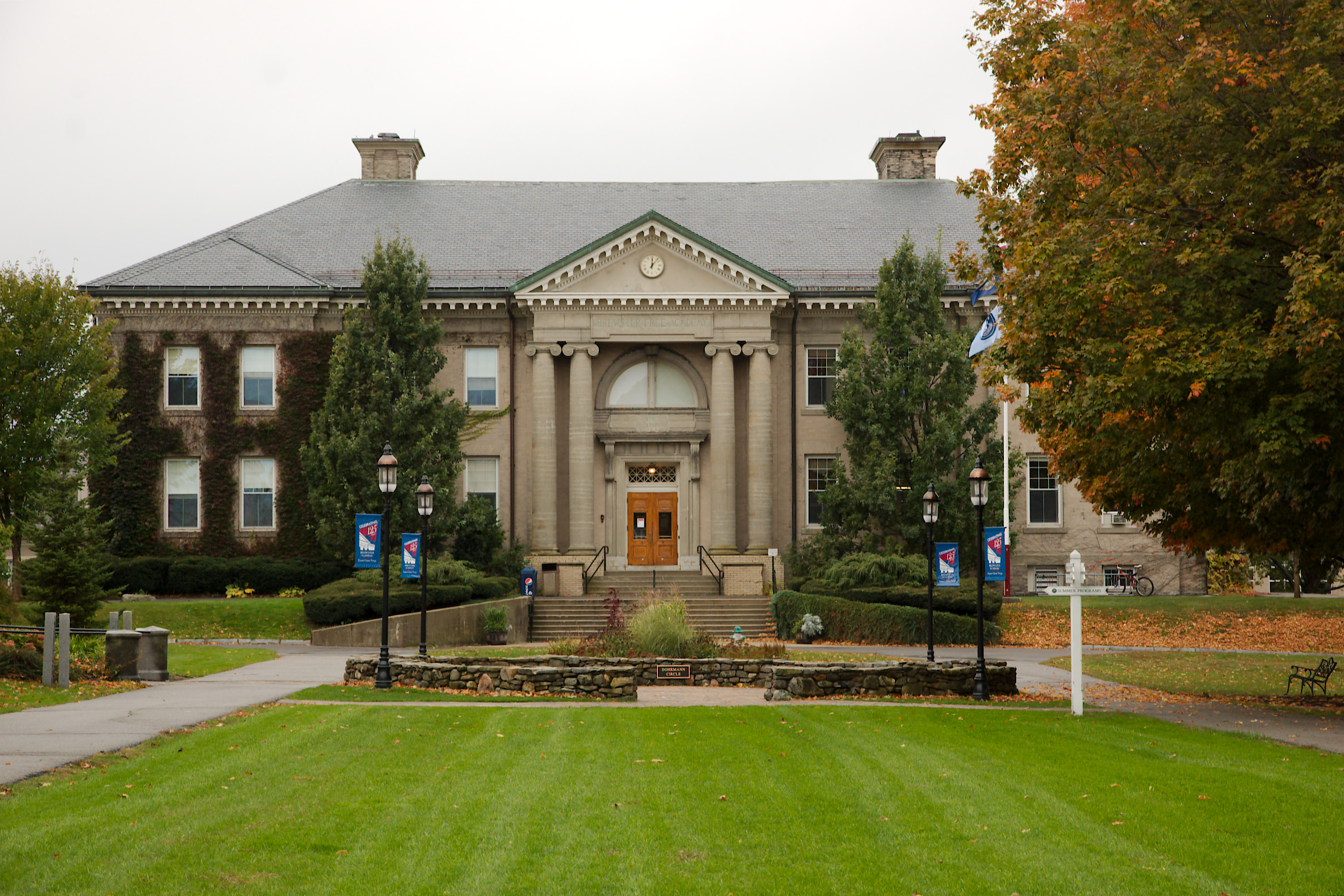
Brewster Academy's Academic Building, where most classes are held

The school was founded in 1820 by local citizens as a "building for higher education". Originally called the "Wolfeboro & Tuftonboro Academy", in 1887 it was renamed "Brewster Free Academy" in honor of benefactor John Brewster. For sixty years it charged no tuition fee to local residents, and, from its inception until 1964, the school served as the only high school in Wolfeboro, as well as serving day students from neighboring towns. In 1946, the academy begin to charge a small tuition, and Wolfeboro at its town meeting in March 1947 voted to pay local students' tuition fees. During the immediate postwar years, it was a popular school with military veterans seeking to improve their credentials for a university education under the G.I. Bill. In 1963 the graduating class consisted of 60 local students, with 30 additional post-graduate students who boarded on campus. Many were there to increase their athletic prowess, and some, including Milt Morin who played in the NFL, had successful college and pro sports careers. The local students were then moved to Kingswood Regional High School in town and Brewster became a private boarding school.

In 1985, Digital Equipment Corporation co-founder Ken Olsen donated a number of Digital personal computers to Brewster. The computers were part of a new lab dedicated to Grace Murray Hopper, whose family had a summer house in Wolfeboro. The lab is called the Grace Murray Hopper Center for Computer Learning.

Brewster has hosted the Great Waters Music Festival since 1995. This summer festival promotes live musical performances including choral, symphonic, folk, pops, jazz, Broadway, dance, and renowned vocal and instrumental artists. Celebrity performers have included Wynton Marsalis, Dave Brubeck, Arlo Guthrie, Chuck Mangione, and the Glenn Miller Orchestra.

In 2020, Brewster's prep basketball team won their 7th National Prep Basketball Championship (2010; 2012; 2014; 2015; 2017; 2019; 2020). Twenty-seven alumni have played in the NBA, including 14 who have been selected in the NBA draft since 2010. All alumni played under long-time, legendary coach, Jason Smith, who departed for Masters Academy International in spring of 2026.

On July 1, 2021, Kristy Kerin became the 13th Head of School in Brewster's over 200-year history. Notably, she is the first female to hold the position.

== Athletics ==
Brewster Academy provides various afternoon sport programs, such as soccer, basketball, lacrosse, field hockey, ice hockey, or tennis, with members of faculty coaching them. Brewster has a diverse selection of interscholastic sports along with recreational, intramural and instructional sports during the fall, winter and spring seasons. Among the interscholastic sports, Brewster fields varsity, junior varsity and co-ed teams, as well as eight- and four-person shells on the crew teams. Games are typically played on Wednesdays and Saturdays, with a half day of classes on Wednesdays to accommodate games schedules. During games and during regular practices, an athletic trainer is available to help students. The teams are coached by members of faculty at all levels.

Brewster competes in the following interscholastic sports: alpine skiing, baseball, basketball, cross country running, cross-country skiing, field hockey, ice hockey, lacrosse, crew, softball, sailing, snowboarding, soccer, and tennis. Intramural, recreational and instructional offerings include advanced strength training, dance, equestrianism, golf, outdoor skills, snow sports, tennis, ultimate Frisbee, x-fitness, and yoga.

Athletic facilities include a 50,000-square-foot (4,600 m^{2}) athletics and wellness center featuring a convertible turf floor, a four-lane 200-meter indoor track, and a fitness center; six playing fields; nine tennis courts; a boathouse for dry land training for the sailing and crew teams; an indoor rowing tank; and a climbing wall.

== Arts ==
In the performing arts, Brewster has an award-winning chorus, HOWL, which has performed at Carnegie Hall and a drama group that produces musicals, operas and plays throughout the year. There is a chamber orchestra, a chorale, a wind ensemble and a jazz band, and dance instruction is available. An art center is home to ceramics, printmaking, drawing and painting classes. Multimedia and desktop publishing centers feature the latest computers, industry standard software, and video and digital equipment. The newly renovated Anderson Hall, designed by Scott Simons Architects, features a proscenium theater, new lobby and green room. Scott Simons Architects received the AIA NH Honor Award for the design in 2015.

== Notable alumni ==
- Jalen Adams (born 1995), basketball guard for Hapoel Jerusalem in the Israeli Basketball Premier League
- Jeff Adrien (born 1986), basketball player for the UConn Huskies and Milwaukee Bucks
- Doğuş Balbay (born 1989), basketball guard for Anadolu Efes
- Will Barton (born 1991), basketball player for the Denver Nuggets
- Jonah Bolden (born 1996), basketball power forward for Philadelphia 76ers
- Carey Booth (born 2005), basketball player for the Colorado State Rams
- Craig Brackins, basketball player for the Philadelphia 76ers
- Matas Buzelis, basketball player for the Chicago Bulls
- Eli Carter (born 1991), professional basketball player who played for ASE Essaouira of the Nationale 1
- Terrence Clarke, former college basketball player for Kentucky Wildcats
- Marcus Derrickson (born 1996), basketball player for Golden State Warriors
- Melvin Ejim (born 1991), small forward for Budućnost
- C. J. Fair, former small forward for the Syracuse Orange
- Daniel Ford (born 1931), novelist, journalist, and historian
- Topher Grace (born 1978), actor
- Devonte' Graham, basketball player for the New Orleans Pelicans
- Charles Hoag, classical scholar
- James Kirkwood, Jr., author; his novel Good Times Bad Times is set at Brewster, although the school and its buildings are renamed
- Jalen Lecque, guard for the Phoenix Suns
- Mark Lyons (born 1989), basketball guard, top scorer in the Israel Basketball Premier League in both 2015 and 2017
- Jamal Mashburn Jr., basketball player for the Long Island Nets
- Mitch McGary, power forward for the Oklahoma City Thunder
- Donovan Mitchell, NBA All-Star, first-round selection in 2017 NBA draft
- Milt Morin (1942– 2010), NFL tight end
- Miles Norris (born 2000), basketball player for the Atlanta Hawks
- Hosea Quimby (1804-1878), Free Will Baptist minister and educator
- Jalen Reynolds (born 1992), basketball player for Maccabi Tel Aviv of the Israeli Basketball Premier League and Euroleague.
- Kadary Richmond, basketball player for the St. John's Red Storm
- Thomas Robinson, basketball player for the Portland Trail Blazers
- JaKarr Sampson, basketball player for the Indiana Pacers
- Avi Schafer (born 1998), Japanese professional basketball player
- Blake Schilb (born 1983), basketball player for Paris-Levallois
- Justine Siegal (born 1975), first female professional baseball coach and sports educator
- Xavier Silas (born 1988), basketball player for the Philadelphia 76ers
- Justin Simon (born 1996), basketball player for Bnei Herzliya of the Israeli Basketball Premier League
- Jared Terrell (born 1995), basketball shooting guard in the Israeli Basketball Premier League
- Zaire Wade (born 2002), basketball player in South Africa, son of Dwyane Wade
- T. J. Warren (born 1993), forward for the Indiana Pacers
- Aaron Wheeler (born 1998), basketball forward in the Israeli Basketball Premier League
