= Mohamed Abu Arisha =

Israeli basketball player (born 1997)

Mohamed Abu Arisha محمد ابو عريشة
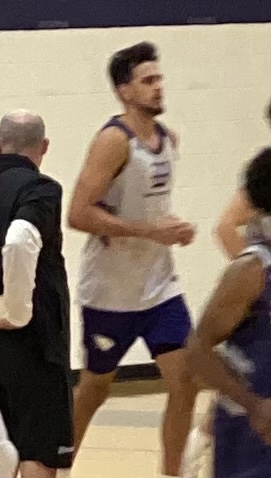
- Mohamed Abu Arisha at an open practice for Kentucky Wesleyan on September 21st 2019.

AMI Basket
- Position: Forward
- League: Division Excellence

Personal information
- Born: November 10, 1997 (age 29) Fureidis, Israel
- Listed height: 6 ft 7 in (2.01 m)
- Listed weight: 200 lb (91 kg)

Career information
- High school: Hod HaSharon, Israel; Elev8 Sports Academy (Delray Beach, Florida)
- College: Jacksonville State (2016–2018); Kentucky Wesleyan (2018–2020)
- NBA draft: 2020: undrafted
- Playing career: 2020–present

Career history
- 2020–2022: Hapoel Be'er Sheva
- 2022-present: AMI Basket

Mohamed Abu Arisha (Arabic: محمد ابو عريشة; born November 10, 1997) is an Arab-Israeli basketball player who has played for Hapoel Be'er Sheva of the Israeli Basketball Premier League, and has played for the Israeli national basketball team. Currently, he plays for Moroccan basketball team AMI Basket. He plays the forward position.

== Biography ==
Abu Arisha was born in Hadera, Israel, and is an Arab-Israeli. His hometown is Fureidis Village, Israel. His parents are Dalia and Khader. He is 6 ft 7 in (201 cm) tall, and weighs 200 pounds (91 kg).

He attended high school in Hod HaSharon, Israel, and played club ball with Wingate Basketball Academy in Israel. Abu Arisha then attended Elev8 Sports Academy ('16) in Delray Beach, Florida.

Abu Arisha attended Jacksonville State University in 2016–18, playing basketball for the Jacksonville State Gamecocks. He then attended Kentucky Wesleyan College ('20) on scholarship. He played basketball for the Kentucky Wesleyan Panthers. In 2018-19 he averaged 11.6 points per game, and 7.7 rebounds per game.

He played for the Israeli national basketball team in the 2016 FIBA U20 European Championship, averaging 5.2 points per game.

Abu Arisha plays for Hapoel Be'er Sheva of the Israeli Basketball Premier League, with whom he signed in May 2020.
