= Eli Carter =

American professional basketball player

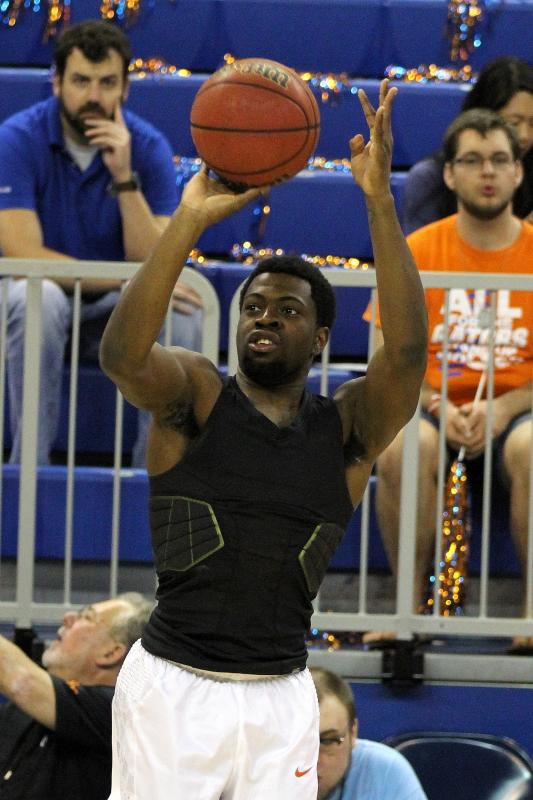

Free agent
- Position: Point guard / shooting guard

Personal information
- Born: May 6, 1991 (age 35) Willingboro Township, New Jersey, U.S.
- Listed height: 6 ft 2 in (1.88 m)
- Listed weight: 201 lb (91 kg)

Career information
- High school: St. Anthony (Jersey City, New Jersey): Brewster Academy (Wolfeboro, New Hampshire)
- College: Rutgers (2011–2013); Florida (2013–2015); Boston College (2015–2016)
- NBA draft: 2016: undrafted
- Playing career: 2016–present

Career history
- 2016: Promitheas Patras
- 2016: Doxa Lefkadas
- 2017–2018: ASE Essaouira

Eli Carter (born June 6, 1991) is an American professional basketball player who last played for ASE Essaouira of the Nationale 1. After two years at Rutgers University and two years at Florida and one year at Boston College Carter entered the 2016 NBA draft but was not selected in the draft's two rounds.

== High school career ==
Raised in Willingboro Township, New Jersey, Carter played high school basketball at St. Anthony High School and after graduating, attended Brewster Academy in Wolfeboro, New Hampshire. He was ranked as the nation's 114th overall prospect and No. 32 shooting guard by Rivals.com and ranked the country's No. 31 point guard recruit by Scout.com.

== College career ==
=== Rutgers ===
A 6'2" point guard, Carter began his college career at Rutgers University. He appeared in 56 games and made 46 starts in his first two collegiate seasons. Carter also led the team in scoring both seasons, averaging 13.8 as a freshman and 14.9 as a sophomore before he fractured his fibula.

=== Florida ===
In 2013, Carter was transferred to the University of Florida and played for the Florida Gators. Carter appeared in 35 games in two seasons and made 17 starts. He only appeared in seven games in 2013–14 and received a medical redshirt to rehab a leg injury he sustained the previous season at Rutgers. As a senior, he made all 17 starts as and in 24.5 minutes, he averaged 8.8 points, 2.0 rebounds and 1.6 assists per game.

== Professional career ==
After going undrafted at the 2016 NBA draft Carter began his pro career in the 2016–17 season in Greece, with Promitheas Patras. On October 4, he left the team after he was replaced by Rashad Anderson. He played with Promitheas in the Greek Cup competition, before being released by them. On September 23, 2016, Carter signed with Doxa Lefkadas of the Greek Basket League.
