= 2011 FIBA Africa Clubs Champions Cup =

- Season: 2011
- Dates: 12–21 December 2011
- Teams: 12

Regular season
- Season MVP: (Tunisia) Makrem Ben Romdhane

Finals
- Champions: (Tunisia) ES Sahel (1st title)
- Runners-up: (Angola) 1º de Agosto
- Third place: (Morocco) AS Salé
- Fourth place: (Angola) Petro de Luanda

The 2011 FIBA Africa Basketball Club Championship (26th edition), was a basketball tournament held in Morocco from December 12 to 21, 2011. The tournament, organized by FIBA Africa and hosted by AS Salé, took place at the Salle El Bouâzzaoui, in the city of Salé.

Tunisian side Étoile Sportive du Sahel won the tournament.

== Draw ==
Group A	Group B
(Libya) Al Ahly (Morocco) AS Salé (Democratic Republic of the Congo) ASB Mazembe (Angola) Recreativo do Libolo (Nigeria) Union Bank (Burundi) Urunani	(Morocco) Al Hoceima (Tunisia) ES Sahel (Equatorial Guinea) Malabo Kings (Angola) Petro Atlético (Angola) Primeiro de Agosto (Nigeria) Royal Hoopers

== Preliminary round ==
Times given below are in UTC.

=== Group A ===
Qualified for the quarter-finals

	Team	W	L	PF	PA	Pts
1	(Morocco) AS Salé	5	0	438	329	10
2	(Angola) Recreativo do Libolo	4	1	392	348	9
3	(Nigeria) Union Bank	3	2	387	332	8
4	(Democratic Republic of the Congo) ASB Mazembe	2	3	316	326	7
5	(Libya) Al Ahly	1	4	348	381	5
6	(Burundi) Urunani	0	5	256	421	5

12 December 2011
13:30

Union Bank (Nigeria)	80–85	(Angola) Rec do Libolo

18:00

AS Salé (Morocco)	110–43	(Burundi) Urunani

15 December 2011
16:00

ASB Mazembe (Democratic Republic of the Congo)	75–62	(Libya) Al Ahly

13 December 2011
12:00

Urunani (Burundi)	51–70	(Libya) Al Ahly

18:00

Rec do Libolo (Angola)	75–78	(Morocco) AS Salé

20:00

Union Bank (Nigeria)	68–49	(Democratic Republic of the Congo) ASB Mazembe

14 December 2011
12:00

Urunani (Burundi)	44–84	(Nigeria) Union Bank

14:00

Rec do Libolo (Angola)	64–62	(Democratic Republic of the Congo) ASB Mazembe

18:00

AS Salé (Morocco)	87–83	(Libya) Al Ahly

16 December 2011
10:00

Rec do Libolo (Angola)	83–56	(Burundi) Urunani

14:00

Al Ahly (Libya)	61–83	(Nigeria) Union Bank

18:00

AS Salé (Morocco)	70–56	(Democratic Republic of the Congo) ASB Mazembe

17 December 2011
14:00

ASB Mazembe (Democratic Republic of the Congo)	74–62	(Burundi) Urunani

18:00

Union Bank (Nigeria)	72–93	(Morocco) AS Salé

20:00

Al Ahly (Libya)	72–85	(Angola) Rec do Libolo

=== Group B ===
Qualified for the quarter-finals

	Team	W	L	PF	PA	Pts
1	(Angola) Primeiro de Agosto	5	0	435	313	10
2	(Tunisia) ES Sahel	4	1	432	335	9
3	(Angola) Petro Atlético	3	2	408	349	8
4	(Morocco) C.R. Al Hoceima	2	3	365	334	7
5	(Equatorial Guinea) Malabo Kings	1	4	229	445	6
6	(Nigeria) Royal Hoopers	0	5	249	342	4

12 December 2011
15:30

Al Hoceima (Morocco)	116–46	(Equatorial Guinea) Malabo Kings

20:00

1º de Agosto (Angola)	90–69	(Angola) Petro Atlético

15 December 2011
14:00

Royal Hoopers (Nigeria)	57–73	(Tunisia) ES Sahel

13 December 2011
14:00

Malabo Kings (Equatorial Guinea)	51–101	(Angola) 1º de Agosto

16:00

Petro Atlético (Angola)	76–86	(Tunisia) ES Sahel

15 December 2011
20:00

Al Hoceima (Morocco)	66–60	(Nigeria) Royal Hoopers

14 December 2011
10:00

Malabo Kings (Equatorial Guinea)	20–0	(Nigeria) Royal Hoopers

16:00

Petro Atlético (Angola)	74–59	(Morocco) Al Hoceima

20:00

1º de Agosto (Angola)	79–62	(Tunisia) ES Sahel

16 December 2011
12:00

Malabo Kings (Equatorial Guinea)	51–101	(Angola) Petro Atlético

16:00

ES Sahel (Tunisia)	84–62	(Morocco) Al Hoceima

20:00

1º de Agosto (Angola)	95–69	(Nigeria) Royal Hoopers

17 December 2011
10:00

Royal Hoopers (Nigeria)	63–88	(Angola) Petro Atlético

12:00

ES Sahel (Tunisia)	127–61	(Equatorial Guinea) Malabo Kings

16:00

Al Hoceima (Morocco)	62–70	(Angola) 1º de Agosto

== Knockout round ==
9th-12th place
Monday 19 December – 10:00
(Nigeria) Royal Hoopers	85
(Libya) Al Ahly	96
Monday 19 December – 12:00
(Burundi) Urunani	67
(Equatorial Guinea) Malabo Kings	50

9th place
Tuesday 20 December – 12:00
(Libya) Al Ahly	90
(Burundi) Urunani	77
11th place
Tuesday 20 December – 10:00
(Nigeria) Royal Hoopers	111
(Equatorial Guinea) Malabo Kings	42

Quarter-finals
Monday 19 December – 18:00
(Morocco) AS Salé	88
(Morocco) Al Hoceima	51
Monday 19 December – 20:00
(Nigeria) Union Bank	69
(Tunisia) ES Sahel	113
Monday 19 December – 14:00
(Democratic Republic of the Congo) ASB Mazembe	57
(Angola) 1º de Agosto	85
Monday 19 December – 16:00
(Angola) Petro Atlético	86
(Angola) Rec do Libolo	80

5th-8th place
Tuesday 20 December – 14:00
(Morocco) Al Hoceima	78
(Nigeria) Union Bank	64
Tuesday 20 December – 16:00
(Democratic Republic of the Congo) ASB Mazembe	65
(Angola) Rec do Libolo	58

5th place
Wednesday 21 December – 13:00
(Morocco) Al Hoceima	66
(Democratic Republic of the Congo) ASB Mazembe	79
7th place
Wednesday 21 December – 11:00
(Nigeria) Union Bank	57
(Angola) Rec do Libolo	95

Quarter-finals
Monday 19 December – 18:00
(Morocco) AS Salé	88
(Morocco) Al Hoceima	51
Monday 19 December – 20:00
(Nigeria) Union Bank	69
(Tunisia) ES Sahel	113
Monday 19 December – 14:00
(Democratic Republic of the Congo) ASB Mazembe	57
(Angola) 1º de Agosto	85
Monday 19 December – 16:00
(Angola) Petro Atlético	86
(Angola) Rec do Libolo	80

Semi-finals
Tuesday 20 December – 18:00
(Morocco) AS Salé	78
(Tunisia) ES Sahel	81
Tuesday 20 December – 20:00
(Angola) 1º de Agosto	91
(Angola) Petro Atlético	82

Final
Wednesday 21 December – 18:00
(Tunisia) ES Sahel	82
(Angola) 1º de Agosto	60
Third place
Wednesday 21 December – 15:30
(Morocco) AS Salé	80
(Angola) Petro Atlético	75

=== 9-12 place classification ===
19 December 2011
10:00

Royal Hoopers (Nigeria)	85–96	(Libya) Al Ahly
Scoring by quarter: 27-16, 19-22, 12-30, 27-28

12:00

Urunani (Burundi)	67–50	(Equatorial Guinea) Malabo Kings
Scoring by quarter: 18-15, 19-9, 16-10, 14-16

=== Quarterfinals ===
19 December 2011
14:00

ASB Mazembe (Democratic Republic of the Congo)	57–85	(Angola) 1º de Agosto
Scoring by quarter: 13-22, 21-27, 10-25, 13-11

16:00

Petro Atlético (Angola)	86–80	(Angola) Rec do Libolo
Scoring by quarter: 21-22, 23-14, 23-18, 19-26

18:00

Al Hoceima (Morocco)	51–88	(Morocco) AS Salé
Scoring by quarter: 18-23, 9-21, 11-13, 13-31

20:00

Union Bank (Nigeria)	69–113	(Tunisia) ES Sahel
Scoring by quarter: 15-24, 21-35, 17-29, 16-25

=== 11th place game ===
20 December 2011
10:00

Royal Hoopers (Nigeria)	111–42	(Equatorial Guinea) Malabo Kings
Scoring by quarter: 24-10, 29-3, 28-16, 30-13

=== 9th place game ===
20 December 2011
12:00

Al Ahly (Libya)	90–77	(Burundi) Urunani
Scoring by quarter: 24-17, 20-19, 24-17, 22-24

=== 5-8 place classification ===
20 December 2011
14:00

Al Hoceima (Morocco)	78–64	(Nigeria) Union Bank
Scoring by quarter: 21-19, 25-22, 13-8, 19-15

16:00

ASB Mazembe (Democratic Republic of the Congo)	65–58	(Angola) Rec do Libolo
Scoring by quarter: 22-16, 15-15, 16-15, 12-12

=== Semifinals ===
20 December 2011
18:00

AS Salé (Morocco)	78–81	(Tunisia) ES Sahel
Scoring by quarter: 15-9, 14-27, 20-15, 29-30

20:00

1º de Agosto (Angola)	91–82	(Angola) Petro Atlético
Scoring by quarter: 22-17, 25-18, 22-13, 22-14

=== 7th place game ===
21 December 2011
11:00

Union Bank (Nigeria)	57–95	(Angola) Rec do Libolo

=== 5th place game ===
21 December 2011
13:00

Al Hoceima (Morocco)	66–79	(Democratic Republic of the Congo) ASB Mazembe

=== Bronze medal game ===
21 December 2011
15:30

AS Salé (Morocco)	80–75	(Angola) Petro Atlético
Scoring by quarter: 23-24, 14-24, 29-11, 14-16
Pts: Masbahi 23		Pts: n/a

=== Gold medal game ===
21 December 2011
18:00

ES Sahel (Tunisia)	82–60	(Angola) 1º de Agosto
Scoring by quarter: 22-16, 18-16, 17-18, 25-10
Pts: B.Romdhane 21		Pts: M.Correia 22

Salle El Bouâzzaoui, Salé

== Final standings ==
Rank	Team	Record
Gold medal	(Tunisia) Étoile du Sahel	7–1
Silver medal	(Angola) Primeiro de Agosto	7–1
Bronze medal	(Morocco) AS Salé	7–1
4	(Angola) Petro Atlético	4–4
5	(Democratic Republic of the Congo) ASB Mazembe	4–4
6	(Morocco) C.R. Al Hoceima	3–5
7	(Angola) Recreativo do Libolo	5–3
8	(Nigeria) Union Bank	3–5
9	(Libya) Al Ahly	3–4
10	(Burundi) Urunani	1–6
11	(Nigeria) Royal Hoopers	1–6
12	(Equatorial Guinea) Malabo Kings	1–6

Étoile du Sahel roster
Atef Maoua, Ben Romdhane, Brahim Naddari, Ersid Ljuca, Hamdi Braa, Maher El Bekri, Moez Mestiri, Omar Mouhli, Radhouane Slimane, Willie Kemp, Zied Toumi Coach: Dragan Petričević

== All Tournament Team ==
G	(Angola)	Carlos Morais
G	(Cameroon)	Christian Bayang
F	(Cape Verde)	Mário Correia
F	(United States)	Willie Kemp
C	(Tunisia)	Ben Romdhane

2011 FIBA Africa Clubs Champions Cup

Étoile Sportive du Sahel
1st Title

Most Valuable Player
(Tunisia) Makrem Ben Romdhane

== See also ==
- 2011 FIBA Africa Championship
