= SLAC (basketball club) =

- Leagues: Ligue 1 Basketball Africa League
- Founded: 2004
- History: Seydou Legacy Athlétique Club; 2004–present
- Arena: Palais des Sports du Stade du 28 Septembre
- Location: Conakry, Guinea
- President: Aboubacar Keita
- Head coach: Paolo Povia
- Championships: 6 (2015, 2016, 2017, 2019, 2020, 2021)
Home

Seydou Legacy Athlétique Club, commonly known as SLAC, is a Guinean basketball team from Conakry. The team plays in the Ligue 1, as well as in the Basketball Africa League (BAL) in of the 2023 season. SLAC has won the Ligue 1 championship six times in history.

SLAC plays its home games in the Palais de Sports de Stade du 28 Septembre, located next to the multi-purpose stadium.

== History ==
In March 2018, SLAC made its debut in the FIBA Africa Basketball League, the top pan-African league. On 1 March 2018, SLAC played its first game ever at an African main tournament, losing 80–65 to JS Kairouan.

In 2019, SLAC won its fourth domestic championship after beating BACK in the finals. Qualified as national champion of Guinea, SLAC played in the 2020 BAL Qualifying Tournaments. Before the start of the qualifiers, SLAC attracted Serbian head coach Zeljko Zecevic.

The following year, the team returned to the BAL qualifiers and qualified after beating Mali's AS Police after overtime in the semifinal. As a result, SLAC became the first team from Guinea to play in the BAL. With a 2–3 record in the Sahara Conference behind standout guard Chris Crawford, the team qualified for the playoffs. There, SLAC lost in the quarter-finals to the defending champions Zamalek from Egypt.

In the 2023 BAL season, they had a 1–4 record and thus failed to qualify for the playoffs a second year in a row. SLAC's star player Dane Miller Jr. was named to the All-BAL First Team. In the 2023 offseason, SLAC's accomplished coach Željko Zečević departed the team for AS Salé. The club hired Italian coach Paolo Povia, former head coach of the Ivory Coast national team, as his replacement.

== Players ==
=== Current roster ===
Note: Flags indicate national team eligibility at FIBA-sanctioned events. Players may hold other non-FIBA nationalities not displayed.

SLAC roster
Players
Coaches

Pos.	No.	Nat.	Name	Ht.	Wt.	Age
G	0	(Guinea)	Balde, Alseny	1.90 m (6 ft 3 in)		23 – 27 May 2001
PG	1	(Nigeria)	Hearst, Zaid Christopher	1.94 m (6 ft 4 in)		33 – 14 February 1992
C	3	(Guinea)	Bangoura, Paul	2.05 m (6 ft 9 in)		23 – 14 November 2001
PG	4	(Guinea)	Thiam, Amadou	1.80 m (5 ft 11 in)		19 – 6 May 2005
C	6	(Guinea)	Bah, Alseny	2.00 m (6 ft 7 in)		24 – 5 March 2001
G	7	(Guinea)	Sylla, Soriba	1.85 m (6 ft 1 in)		21 – 6 October 2003
C	12	(Guinea)	Soumpare, Aboubacar	2.02 m (6 ft 8 in)		19 – 16 August 2005
C	19	(Senegal)	Nguirane, Maodo	2.10 m (6 ft 11 in)		31 – 10 November 1993
SG	21	(Canada)	Doumbouya, Ibrahima	1.85 m (6 ft 1 in)		27 – 7 October 1997
PF	25	(Guinea)	Amouzou, Kouakou	1.95 m (6 ft 5 in)		24 – 14 September 2000
F	41	(United States)	Gilbert, Marcus	1.98 m (6 ft 6 in)		32 – 1 January 1993
SG	45	(Ivory Coast)	Zouzoua, Nisre	1.92 m (6 ft 4 in)		28 – 16 July 1996

Head coach

- (Italy) Paolo Povia

Legend

- (C) Team captain
- Injured

- Roster
Updated: 4 November 2023

=== Depth chart ===
Pos.	Starting 5	Bench 1	Bench 2
C	Chris Obekpa	Mohamed Keita
PF	Josh Nzeakor	Djibril Sibide
SF	Dane Miller Jr.	Dioumba Mara	Aboubacar Camara
SG	Chris Crawford	Mamadi Keita	Alpha Kaba
PG	Ibrahim Fofana	Serigne Mbaye	Mbembah Sankhon

=== Notable players ===
Players who have represented their country
Players who have played in the NBA
Players who have won an individual award while at the club

The following list of former SLAC players includes players who have played at least one official international match for their country, have won a major award or have played in the National Basketball Association.

Name	Nationality	Position	SLAC career
Ibrahima Kalil Fofana	Guinea	PG	2018–
Dane Miller Jr.	United States	PF	2018–
Mamadou Keita	Mali	SG	2021
Mohamed Keita	Guinea	C	2022
Chris Crawford	United States	SG	2022
Chris Obekpa	Nigeria	C	2022
Uchenna Iroegbu	Nigeria	PG	2023
Mambourou Mara	Guinea	PF	2023–

== Head coaches ==
- (Serbia) Željko Zečević: (2021–2023)
- (Italy) Paolo Povia: (2023–present)

== Honours ==
Ligue 1

- Winners (6): 2014–15, 2015–16, 2016–17, 2018–19, 2019–20, 2020–21

Basketball Africa League

- Quarter-finalist (1): 2022

== In the Basketball Africa League ==
Season	Road to BAL				Main competition		
Season	W	L	Result	Qualified	W	L	Result
2021	1	2	First phase	No	DNQ		
2022	3	3	Silver	Yes	3	3	Quarter-finalist
2023	4	1	Silver	Yes	1	4	DNQ
Total	8	6	2/3		4	7	
