= Ibrahima Kalil Fofana =

Guinean basketball player (born 1998)

CRB Tombouctou
- Position: Point guard / shooting guard
- League: Ivorian Basketball Championship

Personal information
- Born: 24 June 1998 (age 28) Conakry, Guinea
- Listed height: 1.96 m (6 ft 5 in)
- Listed weight: 70 kg (154 lb)

Career information
- High school: Georges Vanier Secondary School (Hamilton, Ontario)
- College: Ottawa

Career history
- 2018–2023: SLAC
- 2023–2024: ASA Abidjan
- 2025–present: CRB Tombouctou

Career highlights
- 3× Guinean League champion (2019–2021)

Ibrahima Kalil Fofana (born 24 June 1998) is a Guinean basketball player, who plays for ASA Abidjan and the Guinea national basketball team. Standing at 1.96 m (6 ft 5 in), he plays as point guard.

== Early life and career ==
Born in Conakry, Fofana played high school basketball in Guinea with Kofi Annan Secondary School.

Since 2018, Fofana plays for SLAC of the Guinean Ligue 1. In December 2021, he helped the team qualify for the 2022 season of the Basketball Africa League (BAL).

Because the 2023 season of the Ligue 1 was cancelled due to struggles within the national federation, Fofana played on loan for Adjamé Sports Association (ASA) Abidjan of the Ivorian Basketball Championship.

In the 2025 season he played with CRB Tombouctou in Mali, and helped the team reach the Ligue 1 finals.

== National team career ==
Fofana has represented the Guinea national basketball team and played with his country at FIBA AfroBasket 2021.

== Awards and accomplishments ==
SLAC

- 3× Ligue 1: (2019, 2020, 2021)

== BAL career statistics ==
Legend
GP	Games played	GS	Games started	MPG	Minutes per game
FG%	Field goal percentage	3P%	3-point field goal percentage	FT%	Free throw percentage
RPG	Rebounds per game	APG	Assists per game	SPG	Steals per game
BPG	Blocks per game	PPG	Points per game	**Bold**	Career high

Year	Team	GP	GS	MPG	FG%	3P%	FT%	RPG	APG	SPG	BPG	PPG
2022	SLAC	**6**	**6**	25.6	.333	.286	**.500**	**5.0**	1.8	.7	**.5**	3.2
2023	SLAC	5	3	**25.7**	**.517**	**.375**	.200	3.4	1.8	**1.6**	.4	**6.8**
