= AS Salé =

AS Salé may refer to:

- AS Salé (basketball), basketball section of the multi-sports club
- AS Salé (football), football section of the multi-sports club
