= Hey Mama =

Hey Mama may refer to:

- Hey Mama (band), an American rock band
- "Hey Mama" (Black Eyed Peas song), 2004
- "Hey Mama" (Kanye West song), 2005
- "Hey Mama" (David Guetta song), 2015
- "Hey Mama!" (song), by Exo-CBX, 2016
- "Hey Mamma", a song by SunStroke Project
- "Hey Mama", a song by Mat Kearney from his 2011 album Young Love
- "Hey Mama", a song by Nathaniel Rateliff & the Night Sweats from their 2018 album Tearing at the Seams
- "Hey Mama", a 1984 song by Righeira

== See also ==
- "Hey Mami / Play It Right", a 2014 song by Sylvan Esso
- Hey Ma (disambiguation)
- Mama (disambiguation)
