= CMC (basketball) =

Cercle Municipal de Casablanca commonly known as CMC is a basketball club, part of the eponymous multi-sports club, based in Casablanca, Morocco.

== History ==
CMC was founded in 1934 at the initiative of some city officials, in the heart of Casablanca (Park of the Arab League) and spread over an area of 8000 m^{2}, the CMC is one of the first sports clubs in the city.

In 1972 CMC became runners-up of the Moroccan Cup (Coupe du Trône de basket-ball) and won the right to participate in the 1972–73 FIBA European Cup Winners' Cup where they eliminated in the first round by Mounier Wels (66–99 defeat in Casablanca and 58–107 defeat in Wels, Austria).

== Honours and achievements ==
=== Domestic ===
Moroccan League

- Winners (2): 1974, 1977

Moroccan Cup

- Winners (3): 1967, 1968, 1983
- Runners-up (2): 1962, 1972

=== Regional ===
Basketball League of Maghreb

- Winners (1): 1974
