= Avi & Celia =

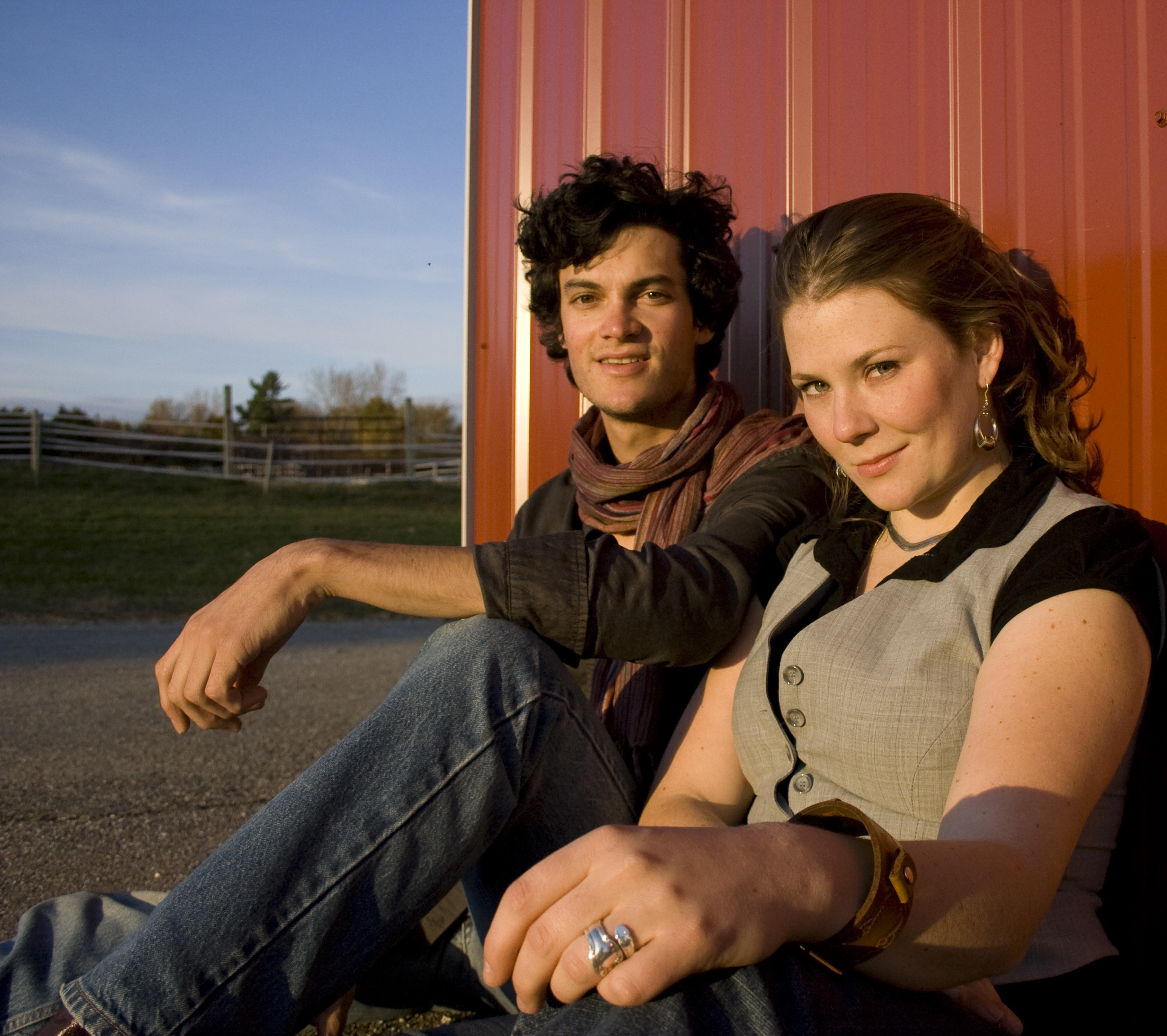

Background information
- Origin: Burlington, Vermont, U.S.
- Genres: Rock, Americana, folk
- Years active: 2003–2009
- Label: Independent
- Spinoffs: Hey Mama
- Members: Avi Salloway; Celia Woodsmith
- Website: aviandcelia.com

Avi & Celia are an Americana duo from Cambridge, Massachusetts.

== History ==
Avi & Celia met at The University of Vermont their first week of first year in 2003. They began performing as a duo in Burlington, Vermont and quickly gained a fan base in the Northeast. In 2007 they released their debut EP Off The Floor. Following the CD release and their graduation from UVM they moved to Boston, Massachusetts to continue a professional career in music. In 2008 they released their second full-length record Let it Rise. Their second record was recorded at WERS studios, the renowned radio station at Emerson College.

Avi & Celia are known for their high-energy performances. The Boston Globe calls it, "Sexy roots swagger with populist fire." They have played over 400 shows throughout the United States and Canada, building a loyal fan base, and have received praise from Yankee Magazine, the Boston Globe, and NHPR.

As a duo they have played several high-profile concerts supporting prominent acts such as Taj Mahal, Leon Russell, and Big Brother and the Holding Company. They have also performed at festivals and venues such as the Burlington Discover Jazz Festival, The Iron Horse, Champlain Valley Folk Festival, Club Passim, Festival Mémoire et Racines in Joliette, Quebec, The Paradise, Higher Ground, and Great Waters Music Festival.

Avi Salloway and Celia Woodsmith started in 2009 performing in the Northeast with their new band Hey Mama, a quartet featuring Paul Chase on bass and Jared Seabrook on drums, for two years before disbanding and moving on to new projects. Celia is currently a vocalist for the popular bluegrass quintet Della Mae.

== Current members ==
- Avi Salloway – acoustic/electric guitar, harmonica, vocals
- Celia Woodsmith – vocals, acoustic guitar, washboard

== Discography ==
- Off the Floor (2007)
- Let It Rise (2008)
