= Hey Ma =

Hey Ma may refer to:

- Hey Ma (album), or the title song, by James, 2008
- "Hey Ma" (Cam'ron song), 2002
- "Hey Ma" (Pitbull and J Balvin song), 2017
- "Hey, Ma" (Bon Iver song), 2019
- "Hey Ma" (Aaron Rowe song), 2025
- "Hey Ma", a song by Chance the Rapper from 10 Day, 2012
- "Hey Ma", a song by Family of the Year from Loma Vista, 2012
- "Hey Ma", a song by The Furys, 1977
- "Hey Ma (Hide the Daughter)", a song by Little Jimmy Dickens, 1959

== See also ==
- Hey Mama (disambiguation)
- "Hey Mami", a song by Sylvan Esso from the 2014 album Sylvan Esso
