= Guinean Basketball Federation =

- Founded: 1962
- Affiliation: FIBA
- Affiliation date: 1962
- Regional affiliation: FIBA Africa
- Headquarters: Palais des Sports Stade du 28 Septembre Conakry
- President: Sakoba Keita

The Guinean Basketball Federation (in French: Fédération Guinéenne de Basket-Ball), also known as FGBB, is the national basketball federation that operates basketball in Guinea.

It organises the national men's and women's teams. The Feguiba also organises the Ligue 1, the domestic top tier basketball league for men's teams. Sakoba Keita is the current president.

The headquarters are located in the Stade du 28 Septembre in Conakry.
