= Abdelhakim Zouita =

Moroccan basketball player

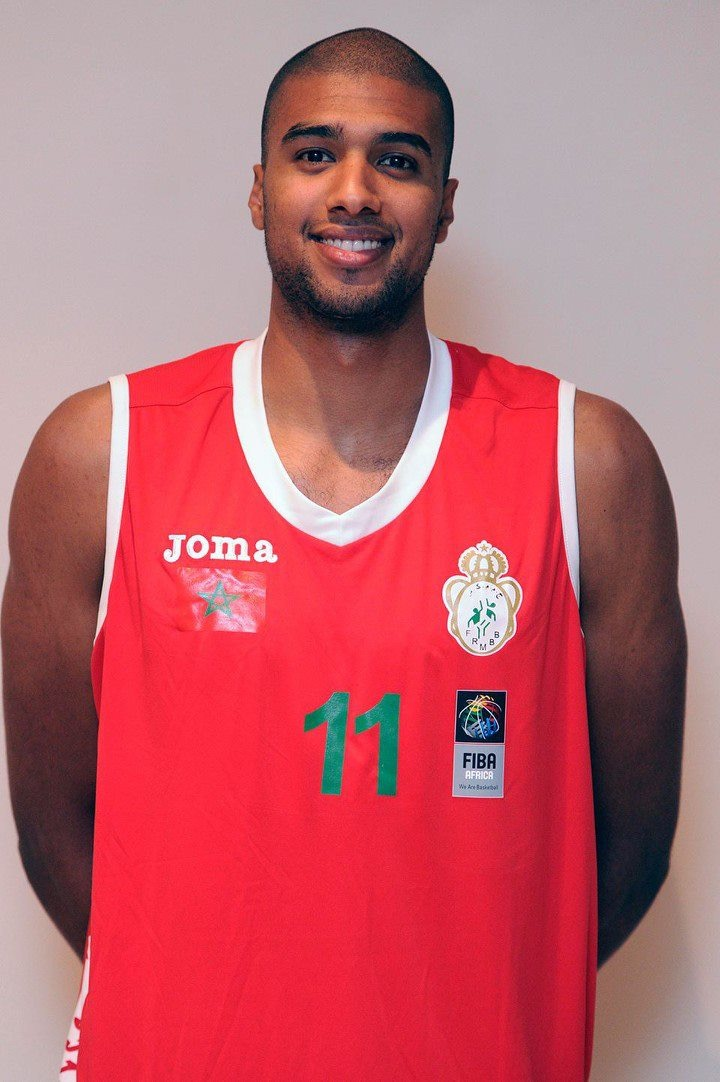
- Portrait of Zouita in 2015

No. 11 – FUS Rabat
- Position: Forward
- League: Moroccan Nationale 1

Personal information
- Born: 12 August 1986 (age 40) Kenitra, Morocco
- Listed height: 6 ft 6 in (1.98 m)
- Listed weight: 198 lb (90 kg)

Career information
- NBA draft: 2008: undrafted
- Playing career: 2004–present

Career history
- 2002–2008: KAC Kénitra
- 2008–2012: AS Salé
- 2012–2013: RS Berkane
- 2013–2020: AS Salé
- 2020–present: FUS Rabat

Career highlights
- FIBA Africa Clubs Champions Cup champion (2017); FIBA Africa Clubs Champions Cup MVP (2017)
Medals
Men's basketball
Representing Morocco
FIBA AfroCan
Gold medal – first place	Angola 2023

Abdelhakim Zouita (born 12 August 1986) is a Moroccan professional basketball player who currently plays for FUS Rabat in the Division Excellence, the top professional basketball league in Morocco.

== Professional career ==
Zouita began his career in 2002 with the basketball section of Kénitra AC, and stayed there for four years. In 2008, he joined AS Salé. After one season with RS Berkane, he joined AS Salé again in 2013, staying for seven season and winning five Division Excellence titles with the team. In 2020, Zouita joined FUS Rabat, and won the 2023 national championship and was also named the league's most valuable player.

== International career ==
Zouita was named to the 15-man Morocco preliminary squad for the AfroBasket 2015.

He won a gold medal at the 2023 FIBA AfroCan.
