= Zakaria El Masbahi =

Moroccan basketball player

No. 7 – AS Salé
- Position: Guard
- League: Nationale 1

Personal information
- Born: 29 March 1979 (age 47) Safi, Morocco
- Listed height: 193 cm (6 ft 4 in)
- Listed weight: 84 kg (185 lb)

Career history
- Tihad Sportif de Casablanca
- ASS Rabat
- AS Salé

Career highlights
- FIBA Africa Champions Cup champion (2017)

Zakaria El Masbahi (born 3 March 1979) is a Moroccan basketball player currently playing for AS Salé in the Nationale 1, the top professional basketball league in Morocco.

== Career ==
El Masbahi is a member of the Morocco national basketball team. He was the leading scorer for Morocco at the 2009 FIBA Africa Championship, averaging 15.9 points per game (PPG) for the tournament. El Masbahi's best performance for the tournament came in the opener against Rwanda, where he scored 37 points in Morocco's 85-84 victory to help lead Morocco into the second round.

== BAL career statistics ==
Legend
GP	Games played	GS	Games started	MPG	Minutes per game
FG%	Field goal percentage	3P%	3-point field goal percentage	FT%	Free throw percentage
RPG	Rebounds per game	APG	Assists per game	SPG	Steals per game
BPG	Blocks per game	PPG	Points per game	**Bold**	Career high

Year	Team	GP	GS	MPG	FG%	3P%	FT%	RPG	APG	SPG	BPG	PPG
2021	AS Salé	3	0	11.4	.385	.300	1.000	.3	1.3	1.3	.0	4.7
Career		3	0	11.4	.385	.300	1.000	.3	1.3	1.3	.0	4.7
