= Alliance Sports Casablanca (basketball) =

Alliance Sports Casablanca (ASC) is a basketball club from Casablanca, Morocco. It is the first club to win the league title in Morocco in 1957.

== History ==
Alliance was founded in 1956 and won the champions title of Morocco in 1957, just after the country's independence and the creation of FRMBB (Royal Moroccan Federation of basketball) in 1956, even before the formal establishment of the discipline Championship in 1960. Under the leadership of its president Armand Abittan and his brother, coach Victor Abittan, the club subsequently completed the double by winning the title again in 1962 against Moghreb Athletic Rabat (MSR) and in 1963 against Club Athletic de Casablanca (CSC).

As champions of Morocco, ASC wins the right to play against top European basketball clubs like Real Madrid in a friendly match, or Simmenthal Milano in the 1962-63 FIBA European Champions Cup, and Antwerpse in the 1963-64 FIBA European Champions Cup. In 1968 the club disbanded.

Among the players who have distinguished themselves in the colors of the ASC, the focus is Bentolila Jean Pierre Gerard Felices, Gilbert Achour, Michel Benoualid, the Martinique Henri Essis, the Americans Caston and Knight, and especially the Algerian Ahmed Benhadji Riad says "Moulay" becomes the captain of the Moroccan national team and participated in the Mexico Olympics in 1968.

== Honours & achievements ==
Moroccan League

- Winners (2): 1962, 1963
