= 1998 FIBA Africa Clubs Champions Cup =

1998 FIBA Africa Champions Cup
16th FIBA Africa Champions Cup

Tournament details
- Host country: Morocco
- Dates: December 4 – 6
- Teams: 4
- Venue(s): 1 (in 1 host city)

Final positions
- Champions: Morocco (1st title)

Official website
- 1998 FIBA Africa Champions Cup official website

The 1998 FIBA Africa Basketball Club Championship (16th edition), is an international basketball tournament held in Fes, Morocco from December 4 to 6, 1998. The tournament was contested by 4 clubs in a round robin system.

The tournament was won by MAS Fez from Morocco, with Gezira SC from Egypt, as the defending champion.

== Participating teams ==
(Angola) ASA
(Egypt) Gezira SC
(Morocco) MAS Fez
(Egypt) Zamalek SC

== Schedule ==
Times given below are in UTC.

=== Day 1 ===
December 4, 1998
18:00

Zamalek SC (Egypt)	65–55	(Egypt) Gezira SC

20:00

MAS Fez (Morocco)	69–64	(Angola) ASA

=== Day 2 ===
December 5, 1998
18:00

Zamalek SC (Egypt)	79–74	(Angola) ASA

20:00

MAS Fez (Morocco)	62–52	(Egypt) Gezira SC

=== Day 3 ===
December 6, 1998
18:00

Gezira SC (Egypt)	52–71	(Angola) ASA

20:00

MAS Fez (Morocco)	72–63	(Egypt) Zamalek SC

== Final standings ==
Rank	Team	Record
Gold medal	(Morocco) MAS Fez	3–0
Silver medal	(Egypt) Zamalek SC	2–1
Bronze medal	(Angola) ASA	1–2
4	(Egypt) Gezira SC	0–3

== All Tournament Team ==
1998 FIBA Africa Clubs Champions Cup

Maghreb Association Sportive de Fez
1st Title

Most Valuable Player

== See also ==
- 1999 FIBA Africa Championship
