= Celia Woodsmith =

American singer-songwriter

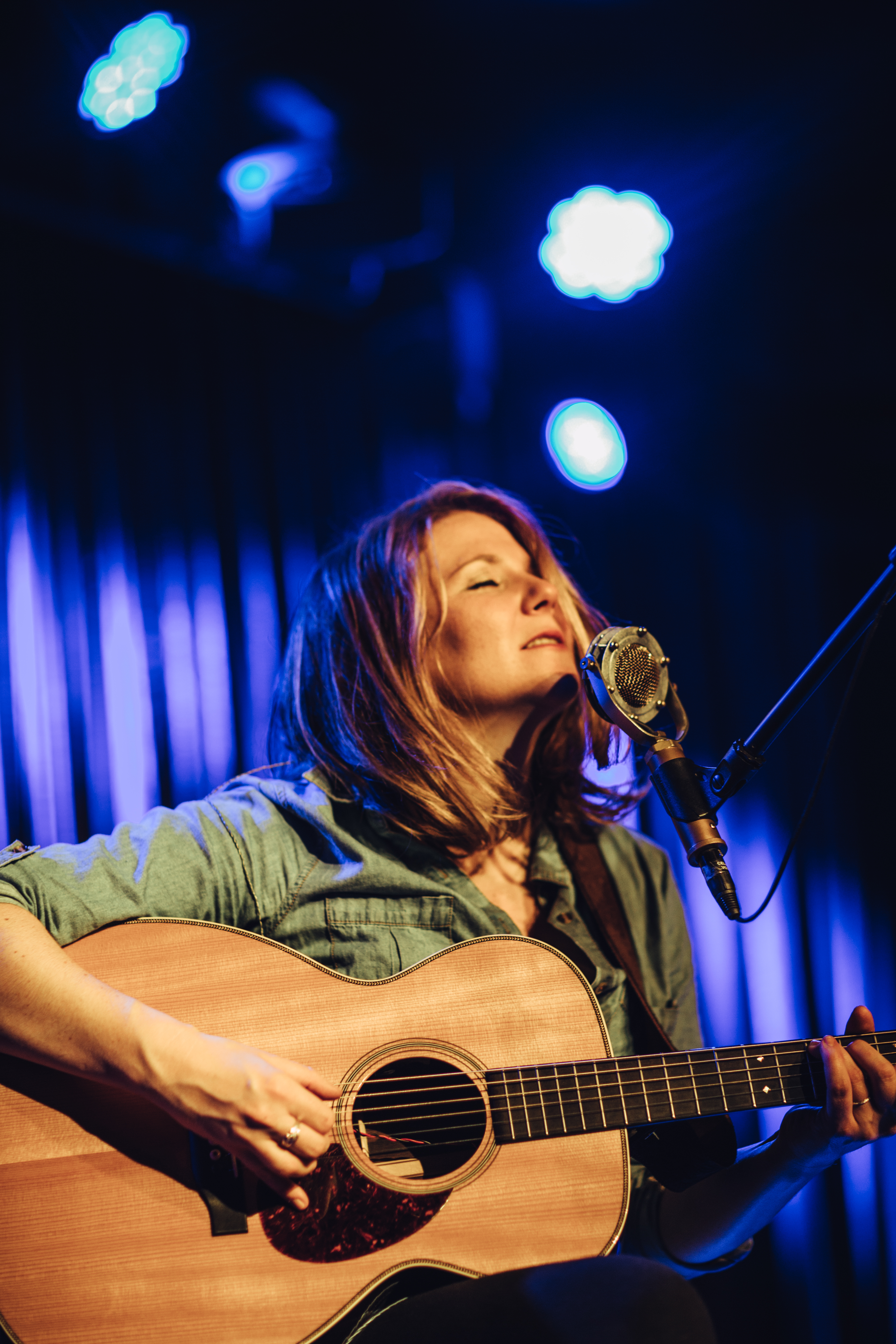
Celia Woodsmith

Celia Woodsmith (born in 1985 in Tryon, North Carolina) is a New England–based singer-songwriter.

== Profile ==
Since January 2011, Woodsmith, has been the lead singer, rhythm guitar player, washboard player, and songwriter for Della Mae. In 2013, Della Mae won the International Bluegrass Music Association's Emerging Artist of the Year award in 2013 and was nominated for a best bluegrass album at the 56th Grammy Awards. Della Mae has worked with the US Department of State as cultural diplomats and, as such, in 2012 travelled to Pakistan, Kazakhstan, Kyrgyzstan, Tajikistan, Turkmenistan and Uzbekistan.

Woodsmith is a founding member of the Boston rock band Say Darling, co-founded with Chris Hersch, former guitar player for Girls, Guns and Glory in 2016.

She plays an Aged Tone OM Bourgeois guitar made in Maine by Dana Bourgeois.

== Personal life ==
Celia Woodsmith went to Hanover High School, in Hanover, New Hampshire, and graduated class of 2003. Her father, Frank Woods, died when she was 25 of glioblastoma multiforme, a type of brain cancer. Her mother, Sybil Smith, is a poet and writer who lives in Norwich, Vermont.

Woodsmith attended the University of Vermont from 2003 to 2007, where, with Avi Salloway, she began performing as the folk duo Avi & Celia. From 2008 to 2010 she was part of the Boston-based "washboard rock n' roll" group Hey Mama.

She currently lives in Kittery, Maine with her husband.

== Discography ==
=== Avi & Celia ===
- Off The Floor (2007)
- Let It Rise (2008)

=== Hey Mama ===
- Hey Mama (2009)
- Dubl Handi Suite (2010)

=== Della Mae ===
- I Built This Heart (2011)
- This World Oft Can Be (Rounder Records, 2013)
- Della Mae (Rounder Records, 2015)
- Butcher Shoppe EP (Rounder Records, 2018)
- Headlight(Rounder Records, 2020)
- Family Reunion (Self Release, 2021)

=== Say Darling ===
- Say Darling (2017)
- Before & After (2021)

=== Solo ===
- Cast Iron Shoes (2018)
- Like Wine b/w Wounded Love + No Angel (single) (2018)
