= Moroccan Throne Cup (basketball) =

- Founded: 1957; 69 years ago
- First season: 1957
- Country: MAR
- Related competitions: Division Excellence
- Current champions: MAS Fes (8 titles) (2025–26)
- Most championships: AS Salé (12 titles)

The Moroccan Throne Cup (in French: Coupe du Trône) is the national cup competition for professional basketball teams in Morocco. The competition was established in 1957.

AS Salé holds the record for most cups won with twelve titles.

== Champions ==
Season	Champions	Runners-up	Score
1957	Mouloudia d'Oujda	FUS Rabat	36–32
1958	Mouloudia d'Oujda	Maghreb de Rabat	36–32
1960	Maghreb de Rabat	Wydad AC	47–37
1962	Wydad AC	Cercle Casablanca	74–34
1967	Cercle Casablanca	FUS Rabat	73–57
1968	Cercle Casablanca	AS FAR	80–68
1969	Mouloudia d'Oujda	AS FAR	51–44
1970	MEC d'Ain Chock	FUS Rabat	82–79
1971	MEC d'Ain Chock	FUS Rabat	67–56
1972	FUS Rabat	Cercle Casablanca	79–76
1973	MAS Fès	FUS Rabat	61–58
1974	Wydad AC	RS Berkane	80–72
1977	FUS Rabat	AS FAR	92–76
1978	FUS Rabat	AS FAR	80–71
1981	FUS Rabat	MEC d'Ain Chock	108–87
1982	FUS Rabat	Wydad AC	58–56
1983	Cercle Casablanca	AS FAR	77–75
1984	KAC de Kénitra	FUS Rabat	69–68
1985	FUS Rabat	Wydad AC	81–63
1986	Wydad AC	TS Casablanca	94–75
1987	AS FAR	Wydad AC	74–67
1988	TS Casablanca	AS FAR	59–58
1989	MAS Fès	TS Casablanca	95–91
1990	TS Casablanca	FUS Rabat	73–67
1991	FUS Rabat	MAS Fès	82–81
1992	MAS Fès	Kawkab de Marrakech	68–67
1993	TS Casablanca	MAS Fès	69–68
1994	TS Casablanca	IR Tanger	67–41
1995	MAS Fès	TS Casablanca	81–68
1996	MAS Fès	IR Tanger	75–57
1997	MAS Fès	Wydad AC	58–57
1998	MAS Fès	Wydad AC	64–58
1999	Raja CA	MAS Fès	51–50
2000	Wydad AC	TS Casablanca	71–63
2001	Raja CA	MAS Fès	77–68
2002	FUS Rabat	MAS Fès	74–72
2003	TS Casablanca	MAS Fès	84–79
2004	FUS Rabat	AS Salé	69–63
2005	AS Salé	TS Casablanca	87–76
2006	IR Tanger	Raja CA	83–72
2007	AS Salé	IR Tanger	73–72
2008	MAS Fès	Raja CA	79–66
2009	AS Salé	MAS Fès	70–58
2010	AS Salé	MAS Fès	65–64
2011	AS Salé	Raja CA	72–68
2012	AS Salé	RS Berkane	65–59
2013	RS Berkane	MAS Fès	73–67
2014	AS Salé	AS Essaouira	83–72
2015	AS Salé	IR Tanger	84–72
2016	AS Salé	Wydad AC	73–64
2017	AS Salé	CR Hoceima	84–72
2018	AS Salé	MAS Fès	87–59
2019	AS FAR	AS Salé	87–81
2020	Not played due to the COVID-19 pandemic		
2021	FUS Rabat	KAC Marrakech	89–80
2022	IR Tanger	FUS Rabat	75–63
2023	Majd Tanger	FUS Rabat	72–54
2024	AS Salé	MAS Fès	70–53
2025	FUS Rabat	AS Salé	73–66
2026	MAS Fès	FUS Rabat	69-64

== Performance by club ==
Club	Winners	Runners-up	Years won
AS Salé	12	3	2005, 2007, 2009, 2010, 2011, 2012, 2014, 2015, 2016, 2017, 2018, 2024
FUS Rabat	11	10	1972, 1977, 1978, 1981, 1982, 1985, 1991, 2002, 2004, 2021, 2025
MAS Fes	8	11	1989, 1992, 1995, 1996, 1997, 1998, 2008, 2026
TS Casablanca	5	5	1988, 1990, 1993, 1994, 2003
Wydad AC	4	5	1962, 1974, 1980, 2000
Cercle MC	3	2	1967, 1968, 1983
MC Oujda	3	1	1957, 1958, 1969
AS FAR	2	6	1987, 2019
Ittihad Tanger	2	4	2006, 2022
Raja de Casablanca	2	3	1999, 2001
MEC d'Ain Chock	2	1	1970, 1971
Renaissance Berkane	1	2	2013
MS Rabat	1	2	1960
Majd Tanja	1	0	2023
KAC de Kénitra	1	0	1984
