= Della Mae =

American bluegrass band

Della Mae is an American bluegrass band formed in Boston, Massachusetts, United States, in 2009. Their name, "Della Mae" comes from the song, "Big Spike Hammer."

Della Mae was formed by Kimber Ludiker, Amanda Kowalski, Grace Van’t Hof, and Avril Smith, and released their first EP, "Della Mae: Acoustic EP" in 2010. In 2011, when Celia Woodsmith joined the band, the group released their first album, I Built This Heart. Their second album, This World Oft Can Be, was nominated for a Grammy Award for Best Bluegrass Album at the 56th Grammy Awards in 2014.

In 2015, they released their third album, Della Mae. The group released Headlight in 2020.

== Band members ==
- Celia Woodsmith - Vocals, Guitar, Washboard (2011–present)
- Kimber Ludiker - fiddle, vocals (2009–present)
- Avril Smith - Guitar, Vocals (2009-2011, 2019–present)
- Vickie Vaughn - Bass, Vocals (2020–present)
- Maddie Witler - Mandolin, Banjo (2020–2022)
- Jenni Lyn Gardner - mandolin, vocals (2009–2020)
- Zoe Guigueno - bass, vocals (2015–2019)
- Courtney Hartman - guitar, banjo, vocals (2009–2018)
- Grace Van't Hof - Vocals, Banjo (2009–2011)
- Shelby Means - bass, vocals (2012–2014)
- Amanda Kowalski - bass, vocals (2009–2012)

== Discography ==
Year	Albums	Label
2011	I Built This Heart	self-released
2013	This World Oft Can Be	Rounder
2015	Della Mae	Rounder
2018	Butcher Shoppe EP	Rounder
2020	Headlight	Rounder
2021	Family Reunion	Self-released
2026	Magic Accident	Compass
