= MTB Majd Tanger =

Basketball team in Tangier, Morocco

- League: Division Excellence
- Founded: 2017
- History: MTB Majd Tanga; 2017-present
- Arena: Salle Couverte Ziaten
- Capacity: 3,500
- Location: Tanger, Morocco

MTB Majd Tanger (in Arabic: نادي مجد طنجة لكرة السلة), also known as Majd Tanga or Majd te Tanger, is a Moroccan professional basketball club based in Tangier. The club was founded in 2017, and plays in the Division Excellence, the top-level basketball league in the country.

Majd Tanger plays in the Division Excellence, following its promotion from the Moroccan First Division in 2020–21. Home games of the team are played in the Salle Couverte Ziaten, which has capacity for 3,500 people. The club's colours are navy and white.

Majd had its best season in 2022–23, when it won the Throne Cup, and reached the league finals for the first time in club history, before losing to FUS Rabat.

== Honours ==
- Division Excellence
  - Runners-up (1): 2022–23
- Moroccan First Division
  - Champions (1): 2020-21
- Moroccan Throne Cup
  - Winners (1): 2022-23
