= Hey Mama (band) =

American contemporary rock band

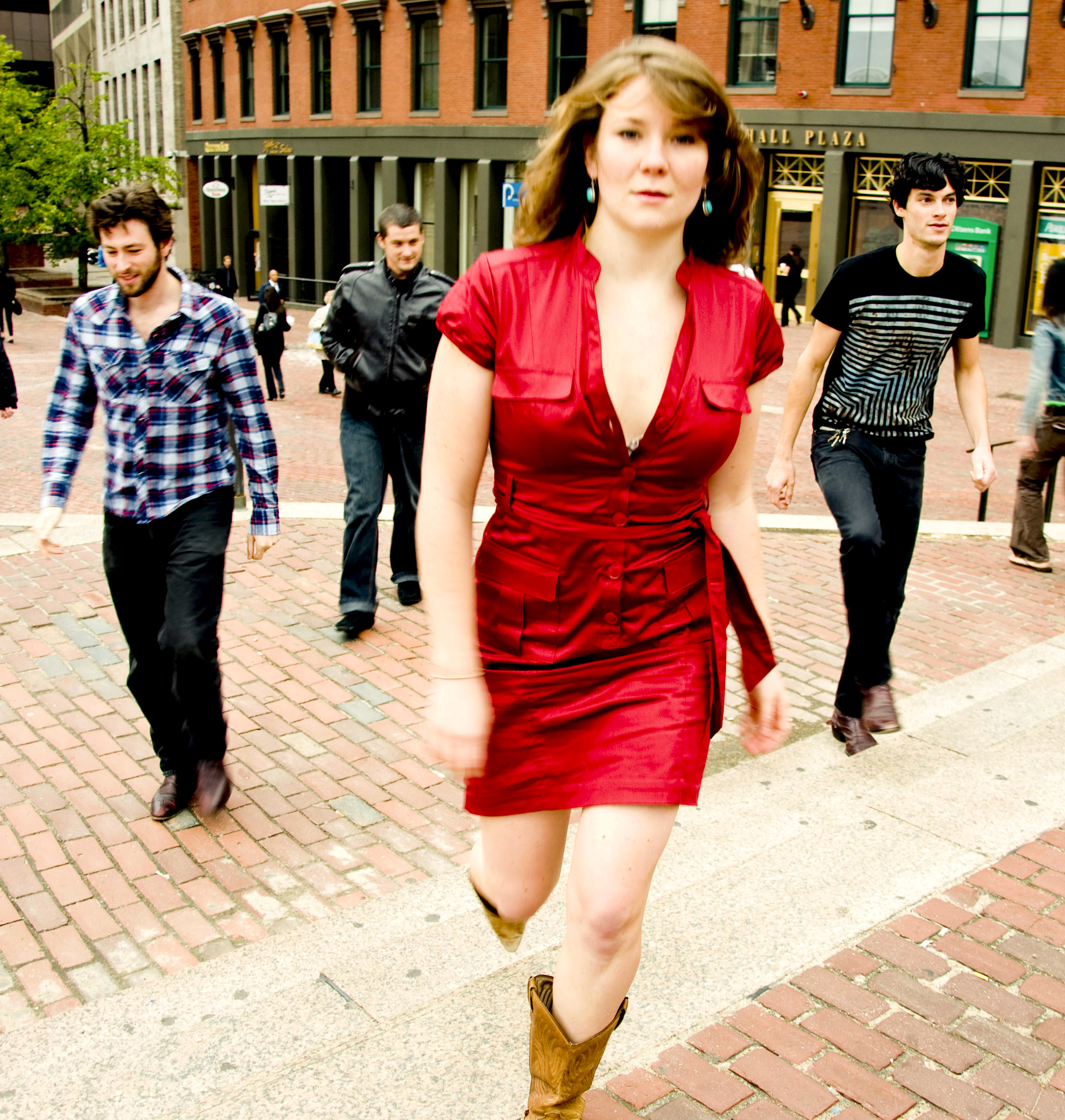

Background information
- Origin: Boston, Massachusetts
- Genres: Rock, roots, blues
- Years active: 2009–2011
- Label: Independent
- Past members: Avi Salloway; Celia Woodsmith; Paul Chase; Jared Seabrook; Ben Kogan
- Website: heymamamusic.com

Hey Mama was a contemporary rock band from Cambridge, Massachusetts.

== History ==
The band Hey Mama stemmed from the folk-rock duo Avi & Celia. Avi Salloway and Celia Woodsmith teamed up Ben Kogan and Jared Seabrook to form Hey Mama in January 2009. The debut album, Hey Mama, was released on December 1, 2009. Hey Mama was recorded with Grammy Award nominated producer Jack Gauthier. The record also featured guest appearances from The Tecumseh Strings, a chamber group of Boston string players.

Hey Mama was known for their high-energy performances. The electrified sound blends new and old with Woodsmith's wailing on the washboard. The Boston Globe calls it, "Sexy roots swagger with populist fire." The band has played over 400 shows throughout the United States and Canada, building a loyal fan base and has received praise from Yankee, the Boston Globe, and NHPR.

Hey Mama has played several concerts supporting Taj Mahal, Leon Russell and Big Brother and the Holding Company.

== Former members ==
- Avi Salloway
- Celia Woodsmith
- Jared Seabrook
- Paul Chase
- Ben Kogan, 2009

== Instrumentation ==
- Avi Salloway; Acoustic Guitar and Electric guitar, Harmonica, Vocals
- Celia Woodsmith; Vocals, Acoustic Guitar, Washboard
- Jared Seabrook; Drums
- Paul Chase; Electric Bass and Double Bass

== Discography ==
- Hey Mama (2009)
- Let It Rise (2008)
- Off the Floor (2007)
