= AMI Basket =

- League: Division Excellence
- Founded: 2014
- Arena: Salle Omnisports de Ifrane
- Location: Ifrane, Morocco
- President: Younes Saddiki
- Head coach: Sebastien Cherasse
Home

Association Michlifen Ifrane Basket-ball, also known as AMI Basket, is a Moroccan basketball club based in Ifrane. The team competes in the Division Excellence, the national top level league. The club was established in 2014 and has a youth academy with over 140 children aged 4 to 14. In 2016, the men's team won the Moroccan Third Division championship.

== Honours ==
Moroccan 3rd Division

- Champions (1): 2015–16
