= Ligue 1 (Guinea) =

- Organising body: FGB
- Country: Guinea
- Number of teams: 6 (2021)
- Current champions: Centre Fédéral (1st title) (2025)
- Most championships: SLAC (6 titles)

The Ligue 1 is the top tier men's basketball league in Guinea. The defending champion is SLAC, which won its sixth title in 2021. Most games of the league are played in the Palais des Sports next to the Stade du 28 Septembre in Conakry.

== History ==
Since 2021, the league has not been organised because of a dispute between the Guinean Basketball Federation (FGBB) and Guinea's Ministry of Sport. In February 2023, President of the FGBB Sakoba Keita announced his plans to professionalize the league by allowing teams to have a corporate status and by introducing a minimum salary for players.

In October 2023, instead of organising a league, the federation organised a qualification tournament to decide the country's representative in the Road to BAL. SLAC won the tournament.

== Current teams ==
In the 2021 season, the league featured six teams:

- SLAC
- Horoya Athletic Club
- DRC
- ASD
- Asfo
- Free

== Champions ==
- 2014–15: SLAC
- 2015–16: SLAC
- 2016–17: SLAC
- 2017–18: Magic Basket Club
- 2018–19: SLAC
- 2019–20: SLAC
- 2020–21: SLAC
- 2025: Centre Fédéral

== List of finals ==
Season	Champions	Runners-up	Final score
2020–21	SLAC	Horoya Athletic Club	86–44
2025	Centre Fédéral	Jorfof	

== In the Basketball Africa League ==
Season	Representative	Road to BAL				Main competition		
Season	Representative	W	L	Result	Qualified	W	L	Result
2021	SLAC	1	2	First phase	No	DNQ		
2022	SLAC	3	3	Silver	Yes	3	3	Quarter-finalist
2023	SLAC	4	1	Silver	Yes	1	4	Conference round
2024	SLAC	1	2	Elite 16	No	DNQ		
2024	Centre Fédéral	1	2	First round	No	DNQ		
Total		10	10	2/5		3	7	
