= Great Waters Music Festival =

Coordinates: 43.5885°N 71.2173°W

The Great Waters Music Festival (GWMF) is an annual summer music festival held in Wolfeboro, New Hampshire, United States, two hours north of Boston. The festival was founded in 1995 to promote live musical performances of outstanding amateur and professional musicians. It consists of a wide range of musical performances including choral, symphonic, folk, pops, jazz, Broadway, and dance. Since the first festival, which attracted 325 attendees, it has grown to an audience of over 7,000 over its eight-week concert schedule. While originally concerts were held in a large white tent, the venue moved in 2011 to the newly built Kingswood Arts Center, an air-conditioned facility which seats nearly 1,000.

== Celebrity performers ==
The GWMF attracts artists from around the world. The following is a partial list of artists who have performed at the festival.

- Lucie Arnaz
- Big Bad Voodoo Daddy
- Dave Brubeck
- Betty Buckley
- Canadian Brass
- Judy Collins
- Sandy Duncan
- Nanci Griffith
- Arlo Guthrie
- Richie Havens
- Natalie MacMaster
- Chuck Mangione
- Wynton Marsalis
- Glenn Miller Orchestra
- Peter Nero
- Gretchen Peters
- Rockapella
- Veronica Swift
- Ronan Tynan
