= Maghreb de Fes (basketball) =

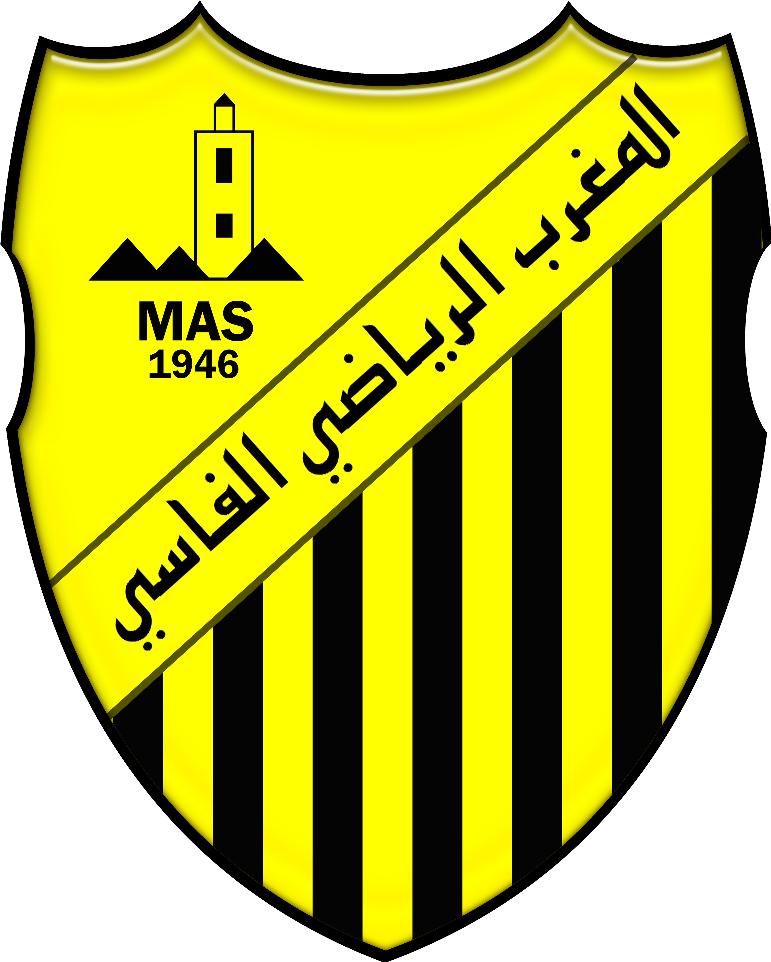
- Nickname: MAS, TIGERS
- Leagues: Division Excellence
- Founded: 1946
- Arena: Salle 11 Janvier
- Capacity: 5,000
- Location: Fes, Morocco
- President: Chakib Dadi
- Head coach: Hugues Occansey
- Championships: 1 FIBA Africa Cup; 5 Moroccan Leagues; 7 Moroccan Cups
- Website: massawi.com
Home

Maghreb Association Sportive de Fès, commonly known as Maghreb de Fes or MAS Fes, is a Moroccan professional basketball team located in Fes. The team competes in the Division Excellence. Home games are played in the Salle 11 Janvier (11 January Hall), which was constructed in 2004 and holds 3,000 places.

The club has won five Moroccan championships, seven Moroccan cups and one African continental championship, in 1998.

== Honours ==
Division Excellence

- Champions (5): 1996, 1997, 1998, 2003, 2007
- Runners-up (5): 2000, 2002, 2005, 2010, 2017

Moroccan Throne Cup

- Champions (8): 1989, 1992, 1995, 1996, 1997, 1998, 2008, 2026
- Runners-up (11): 1991, 1993, 1999, 2001, 2002, 2003, 2009, 2010, 2013, 2018, 2024

FIBA Africa Clubs Champions Cup

- Champions (1): 1998

African Cup Winner's Cup basketball

- Champions (1): 1996

== Players ==
=== 2023–2024 roster ===
- (Morocco) El Houari Bassim
- (Morocco) Masrouri Omar
- (Morocco) Moujahid El Mehdi
- (Morocco) Sekkat Hassan
- (Morocco) Oumalek Hicham
- (Morocco) Bouabid Ismail
- (Morocco) Atik Youness
- (Morocco) Filali Ayoub
- (Morocco) Azouaw Otmane
- (Morocco) Azzouzi Zakariae
- (Morocco) Achouri Ayoub
- (Morocco) Serrhini Zakariae

=== Notable players ===
Note: Flags indicate national team eligibility at FIBA-sanctioned events. Players may hold other non-FIBA nationalities not displayed.

Criteria

To appear in this section a player must have either:

- Set a club record or won an individual award while at the club
- Played at least one official international match for their national team at any time
- Played at least one official NBA match at any time.

- (Togo) Jimmy Williams
- (United States) Kayode Ayeni
