= FUS Rabat (basketball) =

- League: Division Excellence; BAL
- Founded: 10 April 1946; 80 years ago
- History: FUS Rabat (1946–present)
- Arena: Salle Abderrahmane Bouânane
- Capacity: 1,500
- Location: Rabat, Morocco
- President: Said El Yamani
- Head coach: Said El Bouzidi
- Championships: 21 Division Excellence; 11 Moroccan Cup; 1 Moroccan Super Cup
- Website: fus.ma
Home	Away

Fath Union Sport (Arabic: اتحاد الفتح الرياضي) commonly called FUS or FUS Rabat, is a Moroccan basketball club based in Rabat. The team currently plays in the Division Excellence. The team is the basketball section of the multi-sports club with the same name. FUS is the most successful club in Moroccan history, having won a record twenty Division Excellence titles and eleven Moroccan Throne Cups. FUS made their debut in the Basketball Africa League (BAL) in 2024.

Home games are played in the Salle Abderrahmane Bouânane, where there is capacity for 1,500 people.

== History ==
The club was founded on 10 April 1946. The basketball team's first championship came 22 years later, in 1968. In 2001 and 2004, FUS won its sixteenth and seventeenth national titles.

In the 2022–23 season, FUS won its record extending 18th Division Excellence title, ending a 19-year drought. The team was led by French head coach Stéphane Dumas.

As the national champions, FUS played in the 2024 tournament of the Road to BAL. On 4 November 2023, FUS clinched their first-ever spot in the Basketball Africa League (BAL), following a 78-60 win over FAP in the semi-finals. In the Kalahari Conference, FUS went 3–1 against Petro de Luanda and Cape Town Tigers and was the winner of the inaugural edition of the conference.

== Honours ==
=== National ===
Division Excellence

- Champions (21): 1968, 1970, 1971, 1972, 1973, 1978, 1979, 1980, 1981, 1984, 1988, 1990, 1992, 1994, 1999, 2001, 2004, 2023, 2024, 2025, 2026

Moroccan Throne Cup

- Champions (11): 1972, 1977, 1978, 1981, 1982, 1985, 1991, 2002, 2004, 2021, 2025
- Runner-up (10): 1957, 1967, 1970, 1971, 1973, 1984, 1990, 2022, 2023, 2026

Moroccan Super Cup

- Champions (1): 2026

=== Regional ===
Maghreb Club Championship

- Champion (1): 1968
- Runner-up (1): 1971

=== Continental ===
Basketball Africa League

- Kalahari Conference winners (1): 2024

== Players ==
=== Current roster ===
Note: Flags indicate national team eligibility at FIBA-sanctioned events. Players may hold other non-FIBA nationalities not displayed.

FUS Rabat roster
Players
Coaches

Pos.	No.	Nat.	Name	Ht.	Age
G	1	(United States)	Jordan, Devante	1.80 m (5 ft 11 in)	33 – 7 October 1992
G	3	(Morocco)	Nouhi, Ayoub	1.93 m (6 ft 4 in)	27 – 7 January 1999
G	5	(Morocco)	El Haoua, Abdelkarim	1.78 m (5 ft 10 in)	29 – 28 August 1997
PG	6	(Morocco)	Darib, Jaouad	1.92 m (6 ft 4 in)	29 – 28 June 1997
PF	7	(Morocco)	Zeghloul, Mohamed Anas	1.99 m (6 ft 6 in)	22 – 4 August 2004
G	8	(Morocco)	Benhmine, Soufiane	1.92 m (6 ft 4 in)	34 – 8 April 1992
PF	11	(Morocco)	Zouita, Abdelhakim	2.00 m (6 ft 7 in)	40 – 12 August 1986
C	15	(Mali)	Diarra, Aliou	2.08 m (6 ft 10 in)	24 – 31 December 2001
C	17	(Nigeria)	Orizu, Prince	2.08 m (6 ft 10 in)	32 – 10 August 1994
PF	24	(United States)	Shepard, Winston	2.03 m (6 ft 8 in)	33 – 22 September 1993
PF	32	(Morocco)	Azouga, Badr Eddine	2.04 m (6 ft 8 in)	31 – 7 February 1995
SF	55	(Belgium)	Baeri, Yacine	2.00 m (6 ft 7 in)	37 – 10 April 1989

Head coach

- (Morocco) Said El Bouzidi

Assistant coach(es)

- (Morocco) Ahmed Salam

Legend

- (C) Team captain
- Injured

- Roster
Updated: 2 November 2023

== Head coach ==
- (Tunisia) Outail Aouij: (2018–2019)
- (Morocco) Mustapha Chiba: (2021–2022)
- (France) Stéphane Dumas: (2022–2023)
- (Morocco) Said El Bouzidi: (2023–present)

== Notable players ==
Note: Flags indicate national team eligibility at FIBA-sanctioned events. Players may hold other non-FIBA nationalities not displayed.

Criteria

To appear in this section a player must have either:

- Set a club record or won an individual award while at the club
- Played at least one official international match for their national team at any time
- Played at least one official NBA match at any time.

- (Democratic Republic of the Congo) John Jordan

== Season by season ==
The following are FUS Rabat's results in the BAL since their debut in the 2024 season:

BAL champions	Conference champions	Playoff berth

Season	League	Conference	Regular season				Postseason	Head coach	Captain	Qualifying			
Season	League	Conference	Finish	Wins	Losses	Win %	Postseason	Head coach	Captain	Finish	W	L	Win %
FUS Rabat
2024	BAL	Kalahari	1st	3	1	.750	Won seeding game (Al Ahly) 89–78; Lost quarterfinals (Cape Town) 88–91	Said El Bouzidi	Abdelhakim Zouita	2nd	3	2	.600
2025	BAL	Kalahari	3rd	2	4	.333	Lost seeding game (Kriol Star) 88–91 Lost quarterfinals (Al Ittihad) 83–86	Said El Bouzidi	Abdelhakim Zouita	Directly qualified			
2026	BAL									Directly qualified			
Regular season record				5	5	.500	0 BAL championships 1 conference title			Record	3	2	.600
Playoffs record				1	3	.250	0 BAL championships 1 conference title			Record	3	2	.600
