= ASE Essaouira =

Amal Essaouira
- Leagues: Nationale 1
- Founded: 1920
- Arena: Salle Mogador
- Capacity: 1,000
- Location: Essaouira, Morocco
- 2018 position: Nationale 1, 7th
Home

Amal Sportive d'Essaouira, also known as Amal Essaouira or ASE, is a Moroccan basketball club. The club plays in the Nationale 1, the top tier competition in Morocco. In 2014, ASE participated in the Arab Club Competition.

== Players ==
=== Notable players ===
Note: Flags indicate national team eligibility at FIBA-sanctioned events. Players may hold other non-FIBA nationalities not displayed.

Criteria

To appear in this section a player must have either:

- Set a club record or won an individual award while at the club
- Played at least one official international match for their national team at any time
- Played at least one official NBA match at any time.

- (United States) Jeremy Kendle
- (Ivory Coast) Stéphane Konaté (2008–2010)

== Head coaches ==
- (Serbia) Milan Škobalj (2013–2014)
