= Ittihad Tanger (basketball) =

Moroccan basketball club

IR Tanger
- Nickname: IRT
- League: Division Excellence
- Founded: 1983; 42 years ago
- History: Ittihad Tanger; 1983–present
- Arena: Salle Couverte Zyaten
- Capacity: 5000
- Location: Tanger, Morocco

IR TANGER, commonly known as Ittihad Tanger or Ittihad Riadhi de Tanger, is a Moroccan basketball club based in Tanger. Established in 1983, it is part of the multi-sports club which also has a football section. The team plays in the first-tier league Division Excellence and has won three championships, its last one being in 2009. Home games of Ittihad are played at the Salle Badr.

== Honours ==
- Division Excellence
  - Champions (3): 1992–93, 2007–08, 2008–09
  - Runners-up (1): 2005–06
- Moroccan Throne Cup
  - Champions (2): 2005–06, 2021–22
  - Runners-up (4): 1993–94, 1995–96, 2006–07, 2014–15
- Tournoi Mansour Lahrizi
  - Runners-up (1): 2007
