= AS Salé (basketball) =

Moroccan basketball club

- Nickname: Les Corsaires (Corsairs); Pirates du Bouregreg (Pirates of the Bou Regreg)
- Leagues: Division Excellence
- Founded: 1928
- History: AS Salé; 1928–present
- Arena: Salle El Bouâzzaoui
- Capacity: 2,000
- Location: Salé, Morocco
- President: Abderraouf Bentaleb
- Head coach: Zakaria El Mesbahi
- Championships: 9 Moroccan Leagues; 12 Moroccan Cups; 1 FIBA Africa League
- Website: assbasketball.com
Home	Away	Third

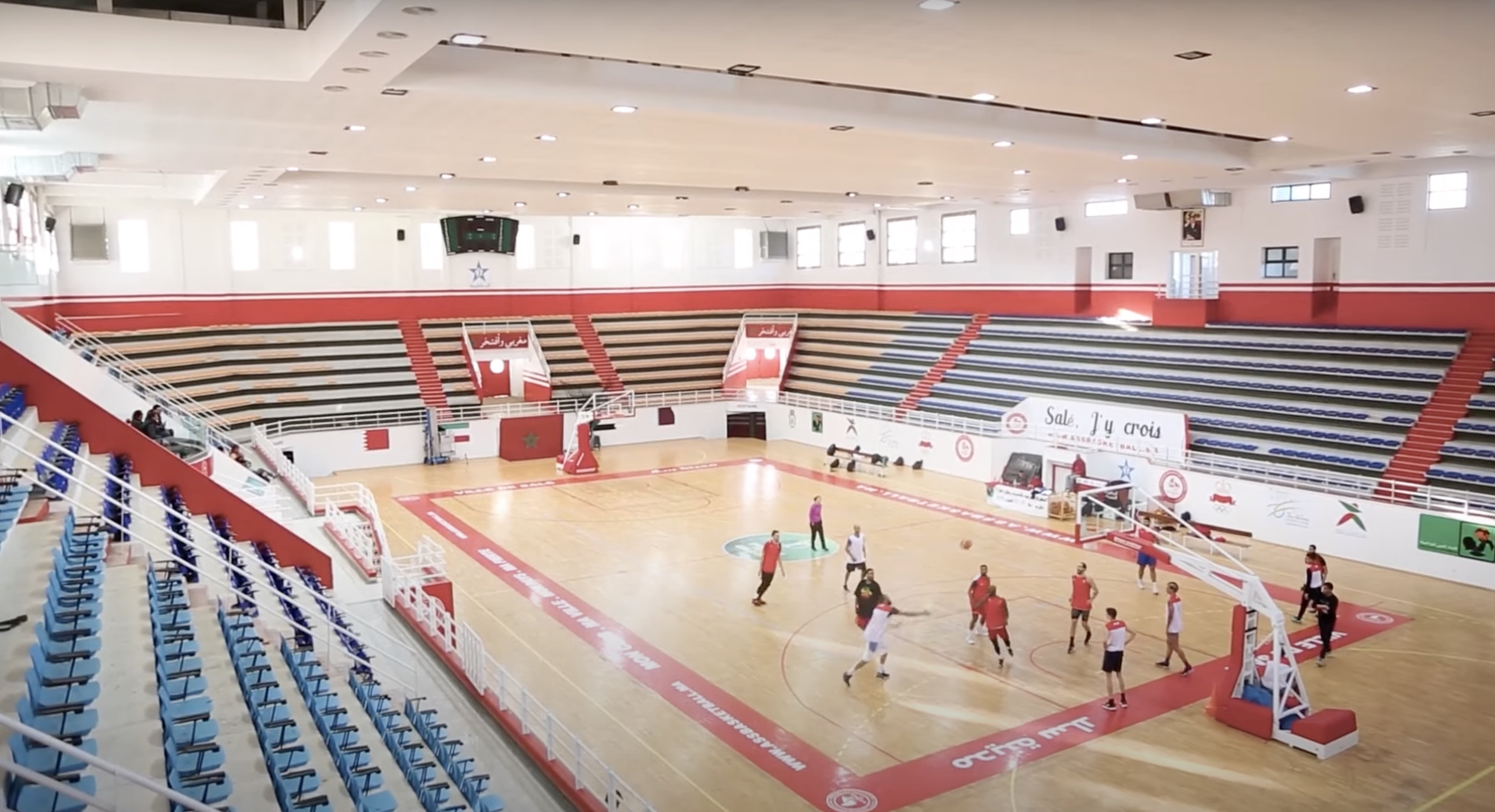
The Salle El Bouâzzaoui, the home arena of AS Salé

Association Sportive Salé (Arabic: جمعية سلا), commonly known as AS Salé, is a Moroccan basketball club from Salé. The club competes in the Division Excellence. Notable players of the team include senior men's Moroccan national basketball team members Abderrahim Najah, Zakaria El Masbahi and Soufiane Kourdou.

Salé has won the Moroccan championship 9 times and the Moroccan Throne Cup a record 12 times. The team won one continental title, the FIBA Africa Champions Cup, in 2017. Salé also participated in the first two seasons of the Basketball Africa League (BAL) in 2021 and 2022.

== History ==
The basketball section of the multi-sports club AS Salé was established on 1928. The team played in the Division Excellence, Morocco's first tier, for years but did not win its first league title until 2010.

On 20 December 2017, Salé won the 2017 FIBA Africa Champions Cup, Salé's first international title and the first title of a Moroccan team at the event in almost 20 years. It did so by defeating Étoile de Radès in Radès, winning the final 77–69. Head coach of the winning team was Said El Bouzidi. After the tournament, Salé's Abdelhakim Zouita was named Most Valuable Player of the competition while Abderrahim Najah was honoured with a place in the All-Star Five.

In the following continental season, Salé had another outstanding year. The team reached the final for the second consecutive year but failed to defeat the Angolan side Primeiro de Agosto.

As winners of the 2018–19 Moroccan League, Salé qualified for the inaugural season of the Basketball Africa League (BAL). In its debut season, Salé reached the quarterfinals behind league top scorer Terrell Stoglin who averaged 30.8 points per game. After two seasons were suspended due to the COVID-19 pandemic, the team won its eight national title on 27 July 2021, after edging FUS Rabat in the final.

In March 2022, Liz Mills signed as head coach of Salé, becoming the first female head coach of a men's team in Morocco and the Arab world. In the 2022 BAL season, they were eliminated by Petro de Luanda for a second year in a row. Mills left Salé after the BAL, making room for Said El Bouzidi to return. On 30 June 2022, Salé won its ninth Division Excellence championship after beating FUS Rabat in the finals.

On 12 October 2023, Salé defeated Al Ahly in the semi-final of the 2023 Arab Club Basketball Championship, thus reaching the final for the fifth time in its history. They placed second after losing the final against Beirut Club.

== Honours ==
Honours		Number	Years
Domestic
Division Excellence	Winners	9	2009–10, 2010–11, 2013–14, 2014–15, 2015–16, 2016–17, 2017–18, 2020–21, 2021–22
Division Excellence	Runners-up	7	2003–04, 2006–07, 2007–08, 2008–09, 2023–24, 2024–25, 2025–26
Moroccan Throne Cup	Winners	12	2005, 2007, 2009, 2010, 2011, 2012, 2014, 2015, 2016, 2017, 2018, 2024
Moroccan Throne Cup	Runners-up	3	2004, 2019, 2025
International
FIBA Africa Basketball League	Winners	1	2017
FIBA Africa Basketball League	Runners-up	1	2018–19
FIBA Africa Basketball League	Third place	3	2010, 2011, 2016
Arab Championship	Runners-up	5	2011, 2014, 2016, 2017, 2023
Arab Championship	Third place	1	2018

== Players ==
=== Current roster ===
The following is AS Salé's roster for the 2022 BAL season.

Note: Flags indicate national team eligibility at FIBA-sanctioned events. Players may hold other non-FIBA nationalities not displayed.

AS Salé roster
Players
Coaches

Pos.	No.	Nat.	Name	Ht.	Age
SG	1	(Morocco)	Allal, Chems Eddine	1.96 m (6 ft 5 in)	26 – 15 February 2000
PG	2	(Morocco)	El Masbahi, Zakaria	1.93 m (6 ft 4 in)	47 – 29 March 1979
F/C	4	(Morocco)	Najah, Abderrahim	1.98 m (6 ft 6 in)	41 – 20 November 1984
PG	5	(Morocco)	El Madini, Abdelmajid		28 – 18 May 1998
C	6	(Morocco)	Kourdou, Soufiane	2.11 m (6 ft 11 in)	41 – 21 May 1985
SG	10	(Niger)	Harouna, Abdoulaye (I, C)	1.96 m (6 ft 5 in)	34 – 12 February 1992
G	11	(Morocco)	Bennis, Nadir (E)	1.90 m (6 ft 3 in)	22 – 8 November 2003
F/C	15	(Spain)	Calvo Masa, Álvaro (I)	2.03 m (6 ft 8 in)	43 – 27 March 1983
PF	23	(Morocco)	Jaddi, Hamza	1.99 m (6 ft 6 in)	33 – 25 August 1993
PF	24	(Morocco)	Chaoui Kouraichi, Mohammed	2.04 m (6 ft 8 in)	27 – 10 September 1999
PF	34	(Morocco)	Azouga, Badreddine	2.04 m (6 ft 8 in)	31 – 7 February 1995
CG	41	(United States)	Stoglin, Terrell (I)	1.85 m (6 ft 1 in)	34 – 10 November 1991
PF	50	(Morocco)	Boukichou, Khalid	2.08 m (6 ft 10 in)	34 – 17 September 1992

Head coach

- (Australia) Liz Mills

Legend

- (C) Team captain
- (I) Import player
- (E): BAL Elevate player
- Injured

- Roster
Updated: March 5, 2022

=== Past rosters ===
- 2021 BAL season
- 2022 BAL season

=== Notable players ===
Note: Flags indicate national team eligibility at FIBA-sanctioned events. Players may hold other non-FIBA nationalities not displayed.

Criteria

To appear in this section a player must have either:

- Set a club record or won an individual award while at the club
- Played at least one official international match for their national team at any time
- Played at least one official NBA match at any time.

- (Morocco) Soufiane Kourdou (2005–present)
- (Morocco) Abdelali Lahrichi
- (Morocco) Zakaria El Masbahi
- (Morocco) Abderrahim Najah (2009–present)
- (Morocco) Abdelhakim Zouita (2008–2012; 2013–present)
- (Belgium) Yassine El Mahsini (2016–present)
- (Belgium) Khalid Boukichou (2022–present)
- (Central African Republic) Johndre Jefferson (2021)
- (Cameroon) Parfait Bitee (2011–2012)
- (United States) Wayne Arnold (2017–2020)
- (United States) Terrell Stoglin (2021; 2022–present)
- (Niger) Abdoulaye Harouna (2021–present)
- (Tunisia) Radhouane Slimane (2018–2020)

== Head coaches ==
- (Serbia) Željko Zečević (2019)
- (Morocco) Said El Bouzidi (2020–2022)
- (Australia) Liz Mills (2022)
- (Morocco) Said El Bouzidi (2022–2023)
- (Serbia) Željko Zečević (2023–present)
