= Chabab Rif Al Hoceima (basketball) =

- Nickname: CRA
- League: Division Excellence
- Arena: Salle 3 Mars
- Capacity: 1,500
- Location: Al Hoceima, Morocco

Chabab Rif Al Hoceima is a Moroccan basketball club based in Al Hoceima. The team is part of the multisports club with the same name.

== Honours ==
=== National leagues ===
Division Excellence

- Runner-up (1): 2016

Moroccan Throne Cup

- Runner-up (1): 2017

=== African leagues ===
FIBA Africa Clubs Champions Cup

- Quarterfinalist: 2011
