= AS FAR (basketball) =

- Nickname: Les Militaires
- League: Division Excellence
- Founded: 1959
- History: AS FAR; 1959–present
- Arena: Salle Centre Sportif des FAR
- Location: Rabat, Morocco
- President: Al Ayoubi
Home

Association Sportive des Forces Armées Royales (transl. Sports Association of the Royal Armed Forces, Arabic: الجمعية الرياضية للقوات المسلحة الملكية), commonly known as AS FAR (Arabic: نادي الجيش الملكي) or FAR Rabat, is a professional basketball club based in Morocco's capital (Rabat). It is part of the multi-sports club with the same name, its first team plays in the Division Excellence, the country's first-level league.

The basketball team was founded in 1959 and has won the Moroccan championship three times (in 1964, 1969, 1986).

== Honours ==
=== Domestic competitions ===
Division Excellence

- Champions (3): 1964, 1969, 1986

Moroccan Throne Cup

- Winners (2): 1987, 2019
- Runners-up (6): 1968, 1969, 1977, 1978, 1983, 1988

=== International competitions ===
FIBA Africa Clubs Champions Cup

- Third place (1): 2015
