= Division Excellence =

Basketball league in Morocco

- Organising body: FRMBB
- Founded: 1934; 92 years ago
- First season: 1934
- Country: Morocco
- Confederation: FIBA Africa
- Number of teams: 12
- Level on pyramid: 1
- Relegation to: 1NDH
- Domestic cup: Moroccan Throne Cup
- International cup: Basketball Africa League (BAL)
- Current champions: FUS Rabat (21 titles) (2025–26)
- Most championships: FUS Rabat (21 titles)
- President: Mostafa Aourach
- TV partners: Arryadiya
- Website: www.frmbb.ma
- 2025-26 Division Excellence

The Division Excellence (DEX-H) is the top professional basketball league in Morocco. Founded in 1934, the league currently consists of 12 teams. The league is administered by the Royal Moroccan Basketball Federation (FRMBB). The current defending champions are FUS Rabat in 2025–26.

== Current clubs ==
The following 12 teams played in the Division Excellence during the 2023–24 season:

Team	City, Province	Arena
AS Salé	Salé	Salle Bouazzaoui
ASFAR Rabat	Rabat	Salle Centre Sportif Des FAR
Wydad AC	Casablanca	Salle Complexe Mohamed V
Maghreb de Fes	Fez	Salle 11 Janvier
FUS Rabat	Rabat	Salle Ibn Rochd
IRT Tanger	Tangier	Salle Ziaten
Lixus Larache	Larache	Salle Maghreb El Jadid
Raja CA	Casablanca	Salle Complexe Mohamed V
ASA Al Hoceima	Al Hoceima	Salle 3 Mars
KACM Marrakech	Marrakesh	Salle Zerktouni
Majd Tanger	Tangier	Salle Ziaten
ASCEBB	Tantan	Salle Omnisports de Tantan

== Performance by club ==
Teams	Winners	Winning seasons
FUS RABAT	21	1968، 1970، 1971، 1972، 1973، 1978، 1979، 1980، 1981، 1984، 1988، 1990، 1992، 1994، 1999، 2001، 2004، 2023, 2024, 2025, 2026
WYDAD AC	10	1965، 1966، 1967، 1975، 1976 ، 1982، 1983، 1985، 2000، 2013
AS SALE	9	2010، 2011، 2014، 2015، 2016، 2017، 2018، 2021، 2022
US Marocaine	6	1952, 1953, 1954, 1955, 1958, 1959
MAS FES	5	1996, 1997, 1998, 2003, 2007
RU Casablanca	5	1935، 1936، 1937، 1941، 1942
TS Casablanca	4	1987، 1989، 1995، 2002
IR TANGER	3	1993، 2008، 2009
ASFAR RABAT	3	1964، 1969، 1986
AS Casablanca	3	1957، 1962، 1963
OC KHOURIBGA	3	1947، 1948، 1949
Raja CA	2	2005، 2006
CERCLE Casablanca	2	1974، 1977
A.S.P.T.T. Casablanca	2	1950، 1951
B.U.S. Casablanca	2	1946، 1956
Stade Marocain	1	1934
US FES	1	1945
Maghreb SR	1	1960
CC Casablanca	1	1961
BMCI Basket Club	1	1991
RS BERKANE	1	2012

== Champions ==
The following is a list of all the Moroccan top-tier division champions (numbers in brackets denote the title number of the team):

- 1934: Stade Marocain (1)
- 1935: RU Casablanca (1)
- 1936: RU Casablanca (2)
- 1937: RU Casablanca (3)
- From 1938 to 1940: No competition played
- 1941: RU Casablanca (4)
- 1942: RU Casablanca (5)
- From 1943 to 1944: No competition played
- 1945: US Fès (1)
- 1946: B.U.S (1)
- 1947: OC Khouribga (1)
- 1948: OC Khouribga (2)
- 1949: OC Khouribga (3)
- 1950: A.S.P.T.T (1)
- 1951: A.S.P.T.T (2)
- 1952: US Marocaine (1)
- 1953: US Marocaine (2)
- 1954: US Marocaine (3)
- 1955: US Marocaine (4)
- 1956: B.U.S (2)
- 1957: AS Casablanca (1)
- 1958: US Marocaine (5)
- 1959: US Marocaine (6)
- 1960: Maghreb SR (1)
- 1961: CC Casablanca (1)
- 1962: AS Casablanca (2)
- 1963: AS Casablanca (3)
- 1964: FAR de Rabat (1)
- 1965: Wydad AC (1)
- 1966: Wydad AC (2)
- 1967: Wydad AC (3)
- 1968: FUS Rabat (1)
- 1969: FAR de Rabat (2)
- 1970: FUS Rabat (2)
- 1971: FUS Rabat (3)
- 1972: FUS Rabat (4)
- 1973: FUS Rabat (5)
- 1974: Cercle Casablanca (1)
- 1975: Wydad AC (4)
- 1976: Wydad AC (5)
- 1977: Cercle Casablanca (2)
- 1978: FUS Rabat (6)
- 1979: FUS Rabat (7)
- 1980: FUS Rabat (8)
- 1981: FUS Rabat (9)
- 1982: Wydad AC (6)
- 1983: Wydad AC (7)
- 1984: FUS Rabat (10)
- 1985: Wydad AC (8)
- 1986: FAR de Rabat (3)
- 1987: TS Casablanca (1)
- 1988: FUS Rabat (11)
- 1989: TS Casablanca (2)
- 1990: FUS Rabat (12)
- 1991: BMCI Club (1)
- 1992: FUS Rabat (13)
- 1993: Ittihad Tanger (1)
- 1994: FUS Rabat (14)
- 1995: TS Casablanca (3)
- 1996: Maghreb de Fès (1)
- 1997: Maghreb de Fès (2)
- 1998: Maghreb de Fès (3)
- 1999: FUS Rabat (15)
- 2000: Wydad AC (9)
- 2001: FUS Rabat (16)
- 2002: TS Casablanca (4)
- 2003: Maghreb de Fès (4)
- 2004: FUS Rabat (17)
- 2005: Raja CA (1)
- 2006: Raja CA (2)
- 2007: Maghreb de Fès (5)
- 2008: Ittihad Tanger (2)
- 2009: Ittihad Tanger (3)
- 2010: AS Salé (1)
- 2011: AS Salé (2)
- 2012: Renaissance Berkane (1)
- 2013: Wydad AC (10)
- 2014: AS Salé (3)
- 2015: AS Salé (4)
- 2016: AS Salé (5)
- 2017: AS Salé (6)
- 2018: AS Salé (7)
- 2019: No competition due to the COVID-19 pandemic
- 2020: No competition due to the COVID-19 pandemic
- 2021: AS Salé (8)
- 2022: AS Salé (9)
- 2023: FUS Rabat (18)
- 2024: FUS Rabat (19)
- 2025: FUS Rabat (20)
- 2026: FUS Rabat (21)

== Recent finals ==
Edition	Season	Champions	Runners-up	Finals score	Third place
72	2010	AS Salé (1)			–
73	2011	AS Salé (2)	Wydad AC		–
74	2012	Renaissance Berkane (1)	Wydad AC		–
75	2013	Wydad AC (10)	Renaissance Berkane		
76	2014	AS Salé (3)			
77	2014–15	AS Salé (4)			
78	2015–16	AS Salé (5)	Chabab Rif Al Hoceima		Mouloudia Oujda Basket
79	2016–17	AS Salé (6)	Maghreb de Fes		Wydad AC
80	2017–18	AS Salé (7)	Wydad AC		Not played
	2018–19	Cancelled due to the COVID-19 pandemic			
	2019–20	Cancelled due to the COVID-19 pandemic			
81	2020–21	AS Salé (8)	FUS Rabat		FAR Rabat
82	2021–22	AS Salé (9)	FUS Rabat		Not played
83	2022–23	FUS Rabat (18)	MTB Majd Tanger	3–1	Ittihad Tanger
84	2023–24	FUS Rabat (19)	AS Salé	3–1	Maghreb de Fes
85	2024–25	FUS Rabat (20)	AS Salé	3–2	Not played
86	2025–26	FUS Rabat (21)	AS Salé	3–0	Not played
