= Angolan Basketball Federation =

Sports national governing body

Angolan Basketball Federation Portuguese: Federação Angolana de Basquetebol F.A.B.
- IOC nation: ANG
- Sport: Basketball
- Official website: www.fab.ao/web/

HISTORY
- Year of formation: 1976

AFFILIATIONS
- International federation: International Basketball Federation (FIBA)
- Continental association: FIBA Africa

ELECTED
- President: Paulo Madeira Dec 2012 -
- Address: Complexo Desportivo da Cidadela
- Country: Angola

The Angolan Basketball Federation (Federação Angolana de Basquetebol or simply FAB) is the governing body of official basketball competitions in Angola. FAB was founded in 1976, with José Jaime de Castro Guimarães serving as chairman. The federation was first housed at Rua Rainha Ginga and later moved to the current address on the ground floor of an apartment building located in the Cidadela Sports Compound. FAB oversees the activities of the 18 provincial basketball associations in the country. Typically the federation has a 42-member staff, including 3 members of the general assembly, 3 from the audit committee, 5 from the legal board, 5 from the disciplinary board and 16 collaborators while the management is made up of 10 members.

On an annual basis, the federation organizes the men's national championship aka BAI Basket, the women's championship as well as the Angolan Cup and Super Cup, including in the under-age categories. It also oversees the provincial championships organized by the related basketball associations and the participation of national squads in continental and other international events.

== History ==
Basketball in Angola was celebrated on May 18, 2011, its diamond jubilee as it was in May 1930 that a basketball match was first played in the country. Pina Cabral, a Portuguese army officer and physical education teacher, organized in May 1930 the first exhibition game between Sporting Clube de Luanda and Associação Académica, with the former winning by a final score of 8–5.

Angola played an international match for the first time in a friendly against Nigeria in 1976 (lost 62-71), made its debut in the African arena in 1980 (7th place) and in the world arena at the 1986 FIBA World Championship in Madrid (20th place). At the 1992 Summer Olympics in Barcelona, in the opening Olympic game for both teams, the Angolan team played the U.S. Olympic men's basketball team, which included Michael Jordan, Magic Johnson, and Larry Bird, among others.

== Current squads ==
Roster for the AfroBasket 2025.

Angola men's national basketball team roster
Players
Coaches

Pos.	No.	Name	Age – Date of birth	Height	Club	Ctr.
F	0	Eduardo Francisco	21 – 5 November 2003	2.00 m (6 ft 7 in)	Benfica	(Portugal)
G	1	Selton Miguel	24 – 24 October 2000	1.94 m (6 ft 4 in)	Maryland Terrapins	(United States)
G	3	Gerson Gonçalves (C)	29 – 29 March 1996	1.93 m (6 ft 4 in)	Petro de Luanda	(Angola)
PG	5	Childe Dundão	27 – 17 May 1998	1.67 m (5 ft 6 in)	Petro de Luanda	(Angola)
C	13	João Fernandes	32 – 1 December 1992	2.00 m (6 ft 7 in)	Oliveirense	(Portugal)
PF	15	Abou Gakou	28 – 27 May 1997	2.01 m (6 ft 7 in)	Petro de Luanda	(Angola)
PF	22	Silvio De Sousa	26 – 7 October 1998	2.03 m (6 ft 8 in)	Free agent
C	24	Bruno Fernando	26 – 15 August 1998	2.06 m (6 ft 9 in)	Real Madrid	(Spain)
C	34	Kevin Kokila	23 – 3 September 2001	2.05 m (6 ft 9 in)	JL Bourg Basket	(France)
C	44	Jilson Bango	26 – 6 January 1999	2.08 m (6 ft 10 in)	Fenerbaçhe	(Turkey)
SG	47	Milton Valente	26 – 28 September 1998	1.98 m (6 ft 6 in)	Free agent
C	66	Braz Macachi	23 – 5 September 2001	2.02 m (6 ft 8 in)	AD Galomar	(Portugal)

Head coach

- (Spain) Josep Clarós

Assistant coach(es)

- (Angola) Miguel Lutonda
- (Angola) Aníbal Moreira

Legend

- (C) Team captain
- Club – describes last
  club before the tournament
- Age – describes age
  on 12 August 2025

Roster for the 2025 Women's Afrobasket.

Angola women's national basketball team roster
Players
Coaches

Pos.	No.	Name	Age – Date of birth	Height	Club	Ctr.
SG	1	Italee Lucas	36 – 12 January 1989	1.72 m (5 ft 8 in)	APR WBBC	(Rwanda)
PF	5	Joana António	28 – 11 June 1997	1.90 m (6 ft 3 in)	MTÜ Tallinn	(Estonia)
G	6	Isabel Fernando	25 – 5 June 2000	1.68 m (5 ft 6 in)	Sporting Clube de Luanda	(Angola)
SF	8	Sara Caetano	21 – 9 September 2003	1.72 m (5 ft 8 in)	CRC Quinta dos Lombos	(Portugal)
PG	9	Denise Pascoal	25 – 8 September 1999	1.73 m (5 ft 8 in)	Primeiro de Agosto	(Angola)
G	12	Nelma Cunha	23 – 27 February 2002	1.78 m (5 ft 10 in)	Primeiro de Agosto	(Angola)
SF	13	Cristiana Correia	27 – 30 September 1997	1.85 m (6 ft 1 in)	Sporting Clube de Luanda	(Angola)
PF	14	Angelina Golome	37 – 23 March 1988	1.90 m (6 ft 3 in)	Formigas do Cazenga	(Angola)
G	16	Alexia Dizeko	24 – 12 March 2001	1.83 m (6 ft 0 in)
C	18	Avelina Peso	27 – 15 June 1998	1.87 m (6 ft 2 in)	Primeiro de Agosto	(Angola)
C	20	Cristina Matiquite	33 – 12 March 1992	1.91 m (6 ft 3 in)	Primeiro de Agosto	(Angola)
PG	24	Domilda Lussati	29 – 8 March 1996	1.65 m (5 ft 5 in)	Interclube	(Angola)

Head coach

- (Angola) Paulo Macedo

Assistant coach(es)

- (Angola) Fernando Figueiredo
- (Angola) Jaquelina Francisco

Legend

- Club – describes last
  club before the tournament
- Age – describes age
  on 26 July 2025

== Africa Palmarès (national squad) ==
Men

Year	Gold	Silver	Bronze	Year	Gold	Silver	Bronze
1983		Afrobasket Alexandria					
1985		Afrobasket Abidjan					
1987			Afrobasket Tunis	1987	All Africa Games Nairobi		
1989	Afrobasket Luanda						
1992	Afrobasket Cairo						
1993	Afrobasket Nairobi						
1995	Afrobasket Algiers						
1997			Afrobasket Dakar				
1999	Afrobasket Luanda			1999		All Africa Games Jo'burg	
2001	Afrobasket Casablanca						
2003	Afrobasket Alexandria			2003	All Africa Games Abuja		
2005	Afrobasket Algiers						
2007	Afrobasket Luanda			2007	All Africa Games Algiers		
2009	Afrobasket Benghazi						
2011		Afrobasket Antananarivo		2011			All Africa Games Maputo
2013	Afrobasket Abidjan						
2015		Radès 2015		2015	African Games Brazzaville		

Women

Year	Gold	Silver	Bronze	Year	Gold	Silver	Bronze
1981			Afrobasket Senegal				
1986			Afrobasket Mozambique	1987		All Africa Games Nairobi	
1994			Afrobasket South Africa				
2007			Afrobasket Senegal	2007			All Africa Games Algiers
2009			Afrobasket Madagascar				
2011	Afrobasket Mali			2011		All Africa Games Maputo	
2013	Afrobasket Maputo			2013			
2015				2015			African Games Brazzaville

== Participation in world events ==
Year	Event	Ranking	Year	Event	Ranking	Year	Event	Ranking
1986	FIBA World Championship Madrid	20th (out of 24)						
			1988					
1990	FIBA World Championship Buenos Aires	13th (out of 16)						
			1992	Summer Olympics Barcelona	10th (out of 12)			
1994	FIBA World Championship Toronto	16th (out of 16)						
			1996	Summer Olympics Atlanta	21st (out of 24)			
1998								
			2000	Summer Olympics Sydney	23rd (out of 24)			
2002	2002 FIBA World Championship Indianapolis	11th (out of 16)						
			2004	Summer Olympics Athens	23rd (out of 24)			
2006	FIBA World Championship Saitama	10th (out of 24)						
			2008	Summer Olympics Beijing	23rd (out of 24)	2008	2008 Stanković Cup	Champion
2010	FIBA World Championship Instambul	15th (out of 24)				2011	2011 Stanković Cup	Champion
			2012					
2014	FIBA World Championship Spain	17th (out of 24)						

== National Champions ==
Men

Team	Won	Years won
Primeiro de Agosto	18	1981, 1983, 1985, 1986, 1987, 1988, 1991, 2000, 2001, 2002, 2003, 2004, 2005, 2008, 2009, 2010, 2013, 2016
Petro Atlético	12	1989, 1990, 1992, 1993, 1994, 1995, 1998, 1999, 2006, 2007, 2011, 2015
ASA	3	1980, 1996, 1997
Recreativo do Libolo	2	2012, 2014
Sporting de Luanda	1	1984
Ferroviário de Luanda	1	1979

Women

Team	Won	Years won
Primeiro de Agosto	12	1999, 2000, 2001, 2002, 2003, 2004, 2005, 2006, 2008, 2009, 2013, 2015
Interclube	11	1987, 1988, 1989, 1990, 1991, 2007, 2010, 2011, 2012, 2014, 2016
Desportivo Nocal	5	1998

== Angola Cup Winners ==
Men

Team	Won	Years won
Primeiro de Agosto	13	1985, 1986, 1987, 1988, 1992, 1995, 2002, 2003, 2005, 2006, 2008, 2009, 2012
Petro Atlético	12	1990, 1991, 1994, 1996, 1997, 1998, 2000, 2001, 2004, 2007, 2013, 2014
Recreativo do Libolo	5	2010, 2011, 2015, 2016, 2017
ASA	2	1993, 1999
Dínamos	1	1989

Women

Team	Won	Years won
Primeiro de Agosto	10	2000, 2001, 2002, 2003, 2004, 2005, 2006, 2007, 2008, 2009
Interclube	6	2010, 2011, 2012, 2013, 2014, 2016, 2017

== Angola Super Cup Winners ==
Men

Team	Won	Years won
Primeiro de Agosto	12	2001, 2002, 2003, 2004, 2006, 2007, 2008, 2009, 2010, 2012, 2013, 2014
Petro Atlético	5	1992, 1993, 1994, 1995, 2005, 2015
ASA	3	1996, 1997, 1998
Recreativo do Libolo	1	2011, 2016

Women

Team	Won	Years won
Interclube	7	2007, 2010, 2011, 2012, 2013, 2014, 2016
Primeiro de Agosto	7	2002, 2004, 2005, 2006, 2008, 2009, 2015
Desportivo Nocal	1	2000

== Africa Palmarès (clubs) ==
Men

Year	Event	Gold	Silver	Bronze
1987	Africa Champions Cup Alexandria		Primeiro de Agosto	
1994	Africa Champions Cup Cairo		Petro Atlético	
2000	Africa Champions Cup Abidjan		Petro Atlético	
2002	Africa Champions Cup Luanda	Primeiro de Agosto		
2004	Africa Champions Cup Cairo	Primeiro de Agosto		
2005	Africa Champions Cup Abidjan		Interclube	Primeiro de Agosto
2006	Africa Champions Cup Lagos	Petro Atlético	Primeiro de Agosto	
2007	Africa Champions Cup Luanda	Primeiro de Agosto	Petro Atlético	
2008	Africa Champions Cup Sousse	Primeiro de Agosto		ASA
2009	Africa Champions Cup Kigali	Primeiro de Agosto	Petro Atlético	
2010	Africa Champions Cup Cotonou	Primeiro de Agosto		
2011	Africa Champions Cup Salé		Primeiro de Agosto	
2012	Africa Champions Cup Malabo	Primeiro de Agosto	Petro Atlético	
2013	Africa Champions Cup Sousse	Primeiro de Agosto		Rec do Libolo
2014	Africa Champions Cup Tunis	Rec do Libolo		
2015	Africa Champions Cup Luanda	Petro Atlético	Rec do Libolo	

Women

Year	Event	Gold	Silver
2001	Africa Champions Cup Abidjan		Primeiro de Agosto
2003	Africa Champions Cup Maputo		Primeiro de Agosto
2005	Africa Champions Cup Bamako		Primeiro de Agosto
2006	Africa Champions Cup Libreville	Primeiro de Agosto	
2007	Africa Champions Cup Maputo		Primeiro de Agosto
2008	Africa Champions Cup Nairobi		Primeiro de Agosto
2010	Africa Champions Cup Bizerte	Interclube	
2011	Africa Champions Cup Lagos	Interclube	
2012	Africa Champions Cup Abidjan		Interclube
2013	Africa Champions Cup Meknes	Interclube	Primeiro de Agosto
2014	Africa Champions Cup Sfax	Interclube	Primeiro de Agosto
2015	Africa Champions Cup Luanda	Primeiro de Agosto	Interclube

== Chairman history ==
(Angola)	José Guimarães Periquito	1977 -	1987
(Angola)	Carlos Teixeira Cagi	1987 -	1996
(Angola)	Pires Ferreira	1996 -	Dec 2004
(Angola)	Gustavo da Conceição	Dec 2004 -	Dec 2012
(Angola)	Paulo Madeira	Dec 2012 -	

== Head coaches history ==
	Coach (Men)	Achievements																			
			1980	1981	1983	1985	1987	1989	1992	1993	1995	1997	1999	2001	2003	2005	2007	2009	2011	2013	2015
(Portugal)	Mário Palma (M.P.)	G						V.C.	V.C.	V.C.	W.R.		M.P.	M.P.	M.P.	M.P.	A.C.	L.M.		P.M.	
(Angola)	Victorino Cunha (V.C.)	S			W.R.	W.R.													M.G.		M.L.
(Angola)	Wlademiro Romero (W.R.)	B					W.R.					W.R.									
(Angola)	Paulo Macedo (P.M.)	4																			
(Portugal)	Luís Magalhães (L.M.)	5																			
(Angola)	Alberto de Carvalho (A.C.)	6																			
(Spain)	Moncho López (M.L.)	7	M.P.																		
(France)	Michel Gomez (M.G.)	8		W.R.																	

	Coach (Women)	Achievements																
			1981	1983	1984	1986	1990	1993	1994	1997	2000	2003	2005	2007	2009	2011	2013	2015
(Angola)	Aníbal Moreira (A.M.)	G														A.M.	A.M.	
(Angola)	António Henriques (A.H.)	S																
(Angola)	Apolinário Paquete (A.P.)	B	A.H.			A.H.			1994					A.M.	A.M.			
(Angola)	Jaime Covilhã (J.C.)	4										A.P.						J.C.
		5					A.H.			1997	2000							
		6		A.H.				1993					A.M.					
		7			A.H.													

== Trivia ==
In a match played for the Lusophony (Portuguese-speaking countries) Games, on October 7, 2006, Angola beat East Timor 193–33 in what might be the highest score ever reached by the Angolan squad.

== See also ==
- BAI Basket
- Angola Basketball Cup
- Angola Basketball Super Cup
- Victorino Cunha Cup
