= C.D. Primeiro de Agosto (women's basketball) =

Angolan women's basketball club

Primeiro de Agosto
- Nickname: D'Agosto; As Rubro e Negras; As Militares
- League: Angola League; Africa Basketball League
- Founded: August 1, 1977; 48 years ago
- History: 1977–present
- Arena: Pavilhão Victorino Cunha
- Capacity: 1,500
- Location: Luanda, Angola
- Team colors: Crimson and Black
- President: Carlos Hendrick
- Head coach: Jaime Covilhã
- Championships: 12 Angola League; 13 Angola Cups; 8 Angola Super Cups; 3 African Champions Cups
- Website: www.primeiroagosto.com
Home	Away

Clube Desportivo Primeiro de Agosto is an Angolan women's basketball team based in Luanda. The team is part of the multi-sports club with the same name. The club is attached to the Angolan Armed Forces which is its main sponsor.

Primeiro competes at the Luanda Provincial Basketball Championship and at the Angola Women's Basketball League.

== Honours ==
Honours		No.	Years
Leagues
Angola Women's League	Winner	12	1999, 2000, 2001, 2002, 2003, 2004, 2005, 2007, 2008, 2012, 2014, 2015
Angola Women's League	Runner-up	7	1999, 2006, 2009, 2010, 2011, 2013, 2016
Luanda Provincial Championship	Winner	2	2005, 2012
Luanda Provincial Championship	Runner-up	4	2006, 2009, 2010, 2011
Cups
Angola Cup	Winner	13	1999, 2000, 2001, 2002, 2003, 2004, 2005, 2006, 2007, 2008, 2009, 2014, 2015
Angola Cup	Runner-up	3	2010, 2012, 2013
Angola Super Cup	Winner	8	2002, 2003, 2004, 2005, 2006, 2008, 2009, 2015
Angola Super Cup	Runner-up	7	2001, 2007, 2010, 2011, 2013, 2014, 2016
FIBA Africa Club Competitions
African Champions Cup	Winner	3	2006, 2015, 2017
African Champions Cup	Runner-up	7	2001, 2003, 2005, 2007, 2008, 2013, 2014

== Players ==
=== Roster ===
As of November 2016

Note: Flags indicate national team eligibility at FIBA-sanctioned events. Players may hold other non-FIBA nationalities not displayed.

Primeiro de Agosto Women's Basketball roster
Players
Coaches

Pos.	No.	Nat.	Name	Ht.	Wt.	Age
PG	4	(Angola)	Fineza Eusébio (C)	1.68 m (5 ft 6 in)	70 kg (154 lb)	35 – 18 July 1990
SG	5	(Angola)	Joana Bende	1.78 m (5 ft 10 in)		29 – 4 May 1996
SG	7	(Angola)	Rosa Gala	1.75 m (5 ft 9 in)	62 kg (137 lb)	30 – 17 April 1995
PG	9	(Angola)	Helena Viegas			30 – 27 April 1995
SF	10	(Angola)	Sónia Ndoniema	1.88 m (6 ft 2 in)	77 kg (170 lb)	40 – 15 September 1985
C	11	(Angola)	Luísa Tomás	1.92 m (6 ft 4 in)	82 kg (181 lb)	42 – 24 March 1983
SF	12	(Angola)	Elizabeth Mateus	1.79 m (5 ft 10 in)		32 – 30 July 1993
PF	13	(Angola)	Cristiana Correia	1.85 m (6 ft 1 in)		28 – 30 September 1997
SF	14	(Angola)	Ana Gonçalves	1.80 m (5 ft 11 in)	79 kg (174 lb)	32 – 14 February 1993
PF	18	(Angola)	Avelina Peso	1.84 m (6 ft 0 in)		27 – 15 June 1998
C	20	(Angola)	Cristina Matiquite	1.91 m (6 ft 3 in)		33 – 12 March 1992

Head coach

- (Angola) Jaime Covilhã

Assistant coach(es)

- (Angola) Jaqueline Francisco
- (Angola) Walter Costa

Team manager

- (Angola) Joaquim Gomes

Legend

- (C) Team captain
- (I) Import player
- Injured

- Roster

=== Depth chart ===
Pos.	Starting 5	Bench 1	Bench 2	Bench 3
C	Adut Bulgak	Luísa Tomás
PF	Cristina Matiquite	Avelina Peso
SF	Ana Gonçalves	Sónia Ndoniema
SG	Elizabeth Mateus	Joana Bende
PG	Fineza Eusébio	Rosa Gala	Helena Viegas	Helena Francisco

=== Staff ===
(Angola) José Moniz	Vice President for Basketball	Ago 2011 –
(Angola) Eva Nogueira	Head of Basketball Dept
(Angola) Jaime Covilhã	Head Coach
(Angola) Jaqueline Francisco	Assistant Coach

=== Former notable players ===
(Angola)	Irene Guerreiro
(Angola)	Manuela Barbosa "Manú"
(Angola)	Antónia Cruz "Toninha"

=== Managers ===
Nat	Name	Years			League	Champions	Cup	Super Cup
(Angola)	Apolinário Paquete (15)	2001	–	2005	2000, 2001, 2002, 2003, 2004		1999, 2000, 2001, 2002, 2003, 2004, 2005	2003, 2004, 2005
(Angola)	André Manuel (1ºB)	2004	–
(Angola)	Aníbal Moreira	2005	–	2006	2005		2007
(Angola)	Raúl Duarte (4)	2007	–	2008	2007, 2008		2008	2008
(Angola)	Higino Garcia (5)	2009	–	2010		2006	2006, 2009	2009
(Angola)	Aníbal Moreira (3)	2010	–	Feb 2014	2012
(Angola)	Jaime Covilhã (6)	Mar 2014	–	present	2014, 2015	2015	2014, 2015	2015
(Angola)	Jose Carlos Guimaraes	June 2021	present
