= Miguel Lutonda =

Angolan basketball player (born 1971)

Primeiro de Agosto
- Position: Assistant coach
- League: Angolan League; Africa Club Champions Cup

Personal information
- Born: 24 December 1971 (age 54) Luanda, Angola
- Listed height: 186 cm (6 ft 1 in)
- Listed weight: 78 kg (172 lb)

Career information
- Playing career: 1985–2012

Career history
- 1985: GD Banca
- 1986–1996: GD Nocal
- 1996–1997: ASA
- 1998–2012: 1º de Agosto
Medals
Men's basketball
Representing Angola
AfroBasket
Gold medal – first place	Luanda 1999	Angola
Gold medal – first place	Casablanca 2001	Angola
Gold medal – first place	Alexandria 2003	Angola
Gold medal – first place	Algiers 2005	Angola
Gold medal – first place	Luanda 2007	Angola
Bronze medal – third place	Dakar 1997	Angola
FIBA Africa Clubs Champions Cup
Gold medal – first place	Luanda 2007	1º de Agosto
Gold medal – first place	Sousse 2008	1º de Agosto
Gold medal – first place	Kigali 2009	1º de Agosto
Gold medal – first place	Malabo 2012	1º de Agosto
Silver medal – second place	Lagos 2006	1º de Agosto
Silver medal – second place	Salé 2011	1º de Agosto
Bronze medal – third place	Abidjan 2005	1º de Agosto
FIBA Africa U16 Championship
Gold medal – first place	Antananarivo 2013	Angola (U-16)

Miguel Pontes Timóteo Lutonda, 186 cm/´6'1", 78 kg/72 lbs, (born 14 December 1971) is a retired Angolan professional basketball point guard.

For two consecutive years: 2001 and 2002, he received the Angola Sportsman of the Year Award.

He is a two-time FIBA Africa Championship MVP, having won such title in 2001 and 2003. He was also voted MVP at the 2003 Angolan league.

On 17 October 2012 Lutonda played his last official match for Primeiro de Agosto, in a game against Recreativo do Libolo for the Victorino Cunha Cup. At the end of the game, his 14 jersey was retired by Primeiro de Agosto.

== Career as a Player ==
Lutonda represented Angola at the 2000 and 2004 Summer Olympics with the Angola national basketball team. He also competed with Angola at the 2002 and 2006 FIBA World Championships.

== Coaching career ==
In June 2013, Lutonda has been appointed assistant coach of Angola's U-16 national basketball team. In July 2013, Lutonda won his first gold medal (as assistant coach) as Angola beat Egypt 75-66 in the final.

== Achievements ==
MVP
2003 Afrobasket
2003 BAI Basket
2001 Afrobasket

== Titles Won ==
Year	Event				
2012		Angola Cup (PRI)		Champions Cup (PRI)	
2011			Angola Super Cup (PRI)		
2010	BAI Basket (PRI)		Angola Super Cup (PRI)	Champions Cup (PRI)	
2009	Angolan League (PRI)	Angola Cup (PRI)	Angola Super Cup (PRI)	Champions Cup (PRI)	
2008	Angolan League (PRI)	Angola Cup (PRI)	Angola Super Cup (PRI)	Champions Cup (PRI)	
2007			Angola Super Cup (PRI)	Champions Cup (PRI)	AfroBasket (ANG)
2006		Angola Cup (PRI)			
2005	Angolan League (PRI)	Angola Cup (PRI)	Angola Super Cup (PRI)		AfroBasket (ANG)
2004	Angolan League (PRI)		Angola Super Cup (PRI)	Champions Cup (PRI)	
2003	Angolan League (PRI)	Angola Cup (PRI)	Angola Super Cup (PRI)		AfroBasket (ANG)
2002	Angolan League (PRI)	Angola Cup(PRI)	Angola Super Cup (PRI)	Champions Cup (PRI)	
2001	Angolan League (PRI)		Angola Super Cup (PRI)		AfroBasket (ANG)
1999					AfroBasket (ANG)
1997	Angolan League (ASA)				
1996	Angolan League (ASA)				

== Sources ==
- Miguel Lutonda at basket-stats.info
- Angola at the 2000 Olympic Games
