= 2016–17 Angola Basketball Super Cup =

2017 Angola Basketball Super Cup
- League: Angola Basketball Super Cup
- Sport: Basketball
- Duration: 10 November 2015; 9 January 2015
- Teams: 2
- TV partner: TPA2 (Angola) TPA Internacional (Worldwide)

2017 Angola Basketball Super Cup
- Winners: Recreativo do Libolo; Interclube

Angola Basketball Super Cup seasons
- ← 2016 2018 →

The 2017 Angola Basketball Super Cup (24th edition) was contested by Primeiro de Agosto, as the 2016 league champion and Recreativo do Libolo, the 2016 cup winner. Recreativo do Libolo won its 3rd title.

The 2017 Women's Super Cup (22nd edition) was contested by Interclube, the 2016 women's league champion and Primeiro de Agosto, the 2016 cup runner-up. (Interclube won the cup as well). Interclube was the winner, making it is's 8th title.

== 2017 Men's Super Cup ==
10 November 2016
19:00 UTC+1

Rec Libolo	91–66	1º de Agosto
Scoring by quarter: 28-20, 23-13, 14-15, 26-18
Pts: Harris 22; Rebs: Olímpio, Vander 5 Asts: Harris 4		Pts: Gildo 10; Rebs: Tariq 5 Asts: Tariq 4

Pavilhão da Cidadela, Luanda

== 2017 Women's Super Cup ==
10 November 2016
16:00 UTC+1

Interclube	59–52	1º de Agosto
Scoring by quarter: 17-17, 15-7, 8-7, 19-21
Pts: Pauline 14; Rebs: Pauline 13; Asts: Italee 4		Pts: Leia 13; Rebs: Leia 7 Asts: Rosa 4

Pavilhão da Cidadela, Luanda

2017 Angola Men's Basketball Super Cup winner	2017 Angola Women's Basketball Super Cup winner
Clube Recreativo Desportivo do Libolo; 3rd title Team roster: Andre Harris, Benvindo Quimbamba, Eduardo Mingas, Elmer Félix, Je'Kel Foster, Jorge Tati, Joseny Joaquim, Manda João, Mílton Barros, Olímpio Cipriano, Roberto Fortes, Valdelício Joaquim. Head coach: Hugo López	Grupo Desportivo Interclube; 8th title Team roster: Angelina Golome, Astrida Vicente, Emanuela Mateus, Felizarda Jorge, Italee Lucas, Luzia Simão, Merciana Fernandes, Nadir Manuel, Ngiendula Filipe, Pauline Nsimbo, Rosemira Daniel, Sequoia Holmes; Head coach: Apolinário Paquete

== See also ==
- 2016 Angola Basketball Cup
- 2016 BIC Basket
- 2017 Victorino Cunha Cup
