= 2017–18 Angola Basketball Super Cup =

2018 Angola Basketball Super Cup
- League: Angola Basketball Super Cup
- Sport: Basketball
- Duration: 9 November 2017
- Teams: 2
- TV partner: TPA2 (Angola) TPA Internacional (Worldwide)

2018 Angola Basketball Super Cup
- Winners: Interclube

Angola Basketball Super Cup seasons
- ← 2017 2019 →

The 2018 Angola Basketball Super Cup (25th edition) was contested by Benfica do Libolo, as the 2017 league champion and Interclube, the 2017 cup runner-up (Libolo was the cup winner as well). Interclube beat Libolo 82-79 to win its first title ever.

== 2018 Men's Super Cup ==
Thu, 09 Nov 2017
18:00 UTC+1

Interclube	82–79	Benfica Libolo
Scoring by quarter: 24-15, 22-17, 21-18, 15-29
Pts: Salvador, Jungo 18; Rebs: Jungo 7 Asts: Salvador 3		Pts: Milton 25; Rebs: Olímpio 6 Asts: Milton 4

Arena do Kilamba, Luanda

== 2018 Women's Super Cup ==
2018 Angola Men's Basketball Super Cup winner

Grupo Desportivo Interclube
1st title

Team roster: Alexandre Jungo, Dilson Chissuata, Egídio Ventura, Fidel Cabita, Gerson Domingos, Gilson Martins, Henry Uhegwu, Miguel Kiala, Ngombo Rogério, Paulo Barros, Paulo Santana, José Salvador
Head coach: Alberto Babo

== See also ==
- 2016 Angola Basketball Cup
- 2016 BIC Basket
- 2018 Victorino Cunha Cup
