= 1999–2000 Angola Basketball Super Cup =

2000 Angola Basketball Super Cup
- League: Angola Basketball Super Cup
- Sport: Basketball
- Duration: February 10, 2001; March 17, 2001
- Teams: 2
- TV partner: TPA1 (Angola) TPA Internacional (Worldwide) Supersport (Africa)

2000 Angola Basketball Super Cup
- Winners: ASA; Desportivo da Nocal

Angola Basketball Super Cup seasons
- ← 1999 2001 →

The 2000 Angola Basketball Super Cup (7th edition) was contested by Primeiro de Agosto, as the 2000 league champion and Petro Atlético, the 2000 cup winner. ASA was the winner, making its 3rd title.

The 2000 Women's Super Cup (5th edition) was contested by Primeiro de Agosto, as the 2000 women's league champion and Desportivo da Nocal, the 2000 cup runner-up. Desportivo da Nocal was the winner.

== 2000 Men's Super Cup ==
February 10, 2001
18:00 WAT

Report (in Portuguese)

1º de Agosto	79–63	Petro Atlético
Scoring by quarter: 18-19, 18-21, 19-19, 24-4
Pts: n/a		Pts: Belarmino 20

Pavilhão da Cidadela, Luanda

== 2000 Women's Super Cup ==
March 17, 2001
18:00 WAT

Report (in Portuguese)

Desp. Nocal	64–53	1º de Agosto
Scoring by quarter: n/a, n/a
Pts: n/a		Pts: n/a

Pavilhão Anexo, Luanda

== See also ==
- 2000 Angola Basketball Cup
- 2000 BAI Basket
