= 2012 Victorino Cunha Cup =

Victorino Cunha Cup 2012
- League: Victorino Cunha Cup
- Sport: Basketball
- Duration: October 15–17, 2012
- Teams: 4
- TV partner: TPA1 (Angola) TPA Internacional (Worldwide) Supersport (Africa)

Victorino Cunha Cup season
- Winner: Primeiro de Agosto
- Season MVP: Reggie Moore

Victorino Cunha Cup seasons
- ← 2011 2013 →

The Victorino Cunha Cup is an annual Angolan basketball tournament held in honour of former Angolan basketball coach Victorino Cunha. The 4th edition (2012), ran from October 15 to 17, and was contested by four teams in a round robin system. Primeiro de Agosto was the winner.

== Schedule ==
=== Round 1 ===
October 13, 2011
16:00 UTC+1

Report

Petro Atlético	92–74	R. do Libolo
Scoring by quarter: n/a, n/a

Pavilhão do CODENM, Luanda

October 13, 2011
19:00 UTC+1

Report

1º de Agosto	78–89	Interclube
Scoring by quarter: n/a, n/a

Pavilhão do CODENM, Luanda

=== Round 2 ===
October 14, 2011
16:00 UTC+1

Report

Petro Atlético	81–75	Interclube
Scoring by quarter: n/a, n/a

Pavilhão do CODENM, Luanda

October 14, 2011
19:00 UTC+1

Report

1º de Agosto	91–66	R. do Libolo
Scoring by quarter: n/a, n/a
Pts: R.Moore 16		Pts: T.Eddie 19

Pavilhão do CODENM, Luanda

=== Round 3 ===
October 15, 2011
16:00 UTC+1

Interclube	73–89	R. do Libolo
Scoring by quarter: n/a, n/a

Pavilhão do CODENM, Luanda

October 15, 2011
19:00 UTC+1

Report

1º de Agosto	88–76	Petro Atlético
Scoring by quarter: n/a, n/a

Pavilhão do CODENM, Luanda

== Final standings ==
	Teams	Pl	W	L	PF	PA	Diff	P
1.	Primeiro de Agosto	3	2	1	257	231	+26	5
2.	Petro Atlético	3	2	1	249	237	+12	5
3.	Recreativo do Libolo	3	1	2	229	256	-27	4
4.	Interclube	3	1	2	237	248	-11	3

== Awards ==
(United States) Reggie Moore	(PRI)	MVP
(Cameroon) Parfait Bitee	(PET)	Top Scorer
(Angola) Abdel Gomes	(PET)	Top Rebounder

2012 Victorino Cunha Cup
Clube Desportivo Primeiro de Agosto
3rd title

Most Valuable Player
(United States) Reggie Moore

== See also ==
- 2012 BAI Basket
- 2012 Angola Basketball Cup
- 2012 Angola Basketball Super Cup
