= 2009 Victorino Cunha Cup =

Victorino Cunha Cup 2009
- League: Victorino Cunha Cup
- Sport: Basketball
- Duration: October 16–23, 2009
- Teams: 4
- TV partner: TPA1 (Angola) TPA Internacional (Worldwide) Supersport (Africa)

Victorino Cunha Cup season
- Winner: Primeiro de Agosto

Victorino Cunha Cup seasons
- ← n/a 2010 →

The Victorino Cunha Cup is an annual Angolan basketball tournament held in honour of former Angolan basketball coach Victorino Cunha. The 1st edition (2009), ran from October 16 to 23, and was contested by four teams in a round robin system. Primeiro de Agosto was the winner.

== Schedule ==
=== Round 1 ===
October 16, 2009
17:00 UTC+1

Report

Interclube	89–94	R. do Libolo
Scoring by quarter: n/a, n/a

Pavilhão do CODENM, Luanda

October 16, 2009
19:00 UTC+1

Report

1º de Agosto	73–94	ASA
Scoring by quarter: 23-24, 12-27, 13-23, 25-20

Pavilhão do CODENM, Luanda

=== Round 2 ===
October 17, 2009
16:00 UTC+1

Report

Interclube	84–82	ASA
Scoring by quarter: n/a, n/a

Pavilhão do CODENM, Luanda

October 17, 2009
18:30 UTC+1

Report

1º de Agosto	92–89	R. do Libolo
Scoring by quarter: 19-21, 25-27, 26-16, 22-25

Pavilhão do CODENM, Luanda

=== Round 3 ===
October 23, 2009
16:00 UTC+1

Report

R. do Libolo	86–71	ASA
Scoring by quarter: n/a, n/a

Pavilhão do CODENM, Luanda

October 23, 2009
18:30 UTC+1

Report

1º de Agosto	112–66	Interclube
Scoring by quarter: 33-17, 22-17, 29-17, 28-15

Pavilhão do CODENM, Luanda

== Final standings ==
	Teams	Pl	W	L	PF	PA	Diff	P
1.	Primeiro de Agosto	3	3	0	277	249	+28	6
2.	Recreativo do Libolo	3	2	1	269	252	+17	5
3.	Interclube	3	1	2	239	288	-49	4
4.	ASA	3	0	3	247	243	+4	3

2009 Victorino Cunha Cup
Clube Desportivo Primeiro de Agosto
1st title

== See also ==
- 2009 BAI Basket
- 2009 Angola Basketball Cup
- 2009 Angola Basketball Super Cup
