= 2014–15 Angola Basketball Super Cup =

2015 Angola Basketball Super Cup
- League: Angola Basketball Super Cup
- Sport: Basketball
- Duration: 10 January 2015; 9 January 2015
- Teams: 2
- TV partner: TPA2 (Angola) TPA Internacional (Worldwide)

2015 Angola Basketball Super Cup
- Winners: Petro de Luanda; Primeiro de Agosto

Angola Basketball Super Cup seasons
- ← 2014 2016 →

The 2015 Angola Basketball Super Cup (22nd edition) was contested by Recreativo do Libolo, as the 2014 league champion and Petro Atlético, the 2014 cup winner. Petro Atlético won its 6th title.

The 2015 Women's Super Cup (20th edition) was contested by Primeiro de Agosto, as the 2014 women's league champion and Interclube, the 2014 cup runner-up. (Primeiro de Agosto won the cup as well). Primeiro de Agosto was the winner, making it is's 7th title.

== 2015 Men's Super Cup ==
10 January 2015
17:00 UTC+1

Petro Atlético	88–75	Rec Libolo
Scoring by quarter: 15-13, 28-18, 32-25, 13-19
Pts: Quezada 29; Rebs: Leonel 13		Pts: Mílton 22; Rebs: Mingas 12

Pavilhão Palanca Negra, Malanje
Referees: Fernando Pacheco, Carlos Júlio, António Bernardo

== 2015 Women's Super Cup ==
9 January 2015
17:00 UTC+1

1º de Agosto	77–74	Interclube
Scoring by quarter: 11-24, 24-17, 18-13, 24-20
Pts: Sónia 25		Pts: Holmes 22

Pavilhão Palanca Negra, Malanje
Referees: Fernando Pacheco, Carlos Júlio, António Bernardo

2015 Angola Men's Basketball Super Cup winner	2015 Angola Women's Basketball Super Cup winner
Atlético Petróleos de Luanda; 6th title Team roster: Domingos Bonifácio, Edson do Rosário, Eduardo Ferreira, Gerson Gonçalves, Hermenegildo Mbunga, Jason Cain, João Fernandes, Joaquim Pedro, Joceliano Pessoa, Leonel Paulo, Manny Quezada, Paulo Santana, Pedro Bastos, Roberto Fortes, Vladimir Ricardino; Head coach: Lazare Adingono	Clube Desportivo Primeiro de Agosto; 7th title Team roster: Ana Gonçalves, Fineza Eusébio, Helena Francisco, Indira José, Isabel Francisco, Joana Bende, Leia Dongue, Letícia André, Luísa Tomás, Maimouna Diarra, Marinela Muxiri, Nacissela Maurício, Rosa Gala, Sónia Ndoniema; Head coach: Jaime Covilhã

== See also ==
- 2015 Angola Basketball Cup
- 2015 BIC Basket
- 2014 Victorino Cunha Cup
