= 2005–06 BAI Basket =

BAI Basket 2005–06
- League: BAI Basket
- Sport: Basketball
- Duration: February 3, 2005 – June 10, 2006
- Teams: 10
- TV partner: TPA1 (Angola) TPA Internacional (Worldwide) Supersport (Africa)

BAI Basket season
- Champions: Petro Atlético
- Season MVP: (Portugal) Francisco Jordão

BAI Basket seasons
- ← 2004–05 2006–07 →

The 2005–06 Season of BAI Basket (28th edition) ran from February 3, through June 10, 2006 and was contested by ten teams in a round robin system at three rounds. Petro Atlético was the winner.

== BAI Basket Participants (2005–06 Season) ==
Team	Home
ASA	Luanda
Banca de Cabinda	Cabinda
CDUAN	Luanda
Desportivo da NOCAL	Luanda
Interclube	Luanda
Petro Atlético	Luanda
Primeiro de Agosto	Luanda
Sporting de Luanda	Cabinda
Universidade Lusíadas	Luanda
Vila Clotilde	Luanda

== BAI Basket Squads (2005–06 Season) ==
BAI Basket Squads (2005–06 Season)

== Final standings ==
P	Team	Pts
1	Petro Atlético	
2	Primeiro de Agosto	
3	ASA	
4	Interclube	
5	Banca de Cabinda	
6	CDUAN	
7	Vila Clotilde	
8	Sporting Luanda	
9	Desportivo da Nocal	

== Awards ==
2006 BAI Basket MVP

2006 BAI Basket Top Scorer

2006 BAI Basket Top Rebounder

2006 BAI Basket Top Assists

2006 BAI Basket
Atlético Petróleos de Luanda
9th Title

Most Valuable Player

== See also ==
- 2006 Angola Basketball Cup
- 2006 Angola Basketball Super Cup
- Federação Angolana de Basquetebol
