= Supertaça de Angola (basketball) =

Basketball competition in Angola

Super Taça Vladimiro Romero
- Sport: Basketball
- Founded: 1993
- Continent: FIBA Africa (Africa)
- Most recent champions: Petro de Luanda (M) (2024); Interclube (W) (2017)
- Most titles: 1º de Agosto (M) (12 titles); Interclube (W) (8 titles)

The Supertaça de Angola (in English: Angolan Basketball Super Cup), better known as the Supertaça Vladimiro Romeiro, is a single-match competition in Angolan basketball, played between the Angolan league champion and the Angola Cup winner of the previous season. In case the same team happens to win both the league and the cup, the match will be played between the league winner and the cup runner-up.

The Super Cup match marks the beginning of the basketball season, followed by the league and the cup.

Clube Desportivo Primeiro de Agosto has been the most successful club in this competition with a total 12 titles won, whereas in the women's competition, Interclube and Clube Desportivo Primeiro de Agosto share the lead with a total 8 titles won each.

== Men's finals ==
Edition	Season	Date	Venue	Winner	Score	Runner-up	Winning coach	Ref
8th	2001	10 Feb, 2001	Cidadela, Luanda	Primeiro de Agosto (1)	79–63	Petro de Luanda	Mário Palma	
9th	2002	16 Feb, 2002	P. Sporting, Cabinda	Primeiro de Agosto (2)	72–57	Petro de Luanda	Mário Palma	
10th	2003	4 Feb, 2003	Cidadela, Luanda	Primeiro de Agosto (3)	93–71	Petro de Luanda	Mário Palma	
11th	2004	28 Feb, 2004	Cidadela, Luanda	Primeiro de Agosto (4)	79–71	Interclube	Mário Palma	
12th	2005	30 Jan, 2005	P. Sporting, Cabinda	Primeiro de Agosto (5)	97–82	Petro de Luanda	Mário Palma	
13th	2006	27 Jan, 2006	Cidadela, Luanda	Petro de Luanda (5)	97–89	Primeiro de Agosto	Alberto de Carvalho	
14th	2007	12 Jan, 2007	Cidadela, Luanda	Primeiro de Agosto (6)	99–84	Petro de Luanda	Jaime Covilhã	
15th	2008	04 Mar, 2008	Cidadela, Luanda	Primeiro de Agosto (7)	71–69	Petro de Luanda	Luís Magalhães	
16th	2009	11 Nov, 2008	Cidadela, Luanda	Primeiro de Agosto (8)	86–70	ASA	Luís Magalhães	
17th	2010	31 Oct, 2009	Sra Monte, Lubango	Primeiro de Agosto (9)	108–102	Petro de Luanda	Luís Magalhães	
18th	2011	25 Nov, 2010	Cidadela, Luanda	Primeiro de Agosto (10)	77–66	Recreativo do Libolo	Luís Magalhães	
19th	2012	11 Nov, 2011	S.V.Dunem, Huambo	Recreativo do Libolo (1)	67–63	Petro de Luanda	Raúl Duarte	
20th	2013	9 Nov, 2012	P. Sporting, Kuito	Primeiro de Agosto (11)	90–77	Recreativo do Libolo	Paulo Macedo	
21st	2014	11 Nov, 2013	W.Mirabilis, Namibe	Primeiro de Agosto (12)	85–83	Petro de Luanda	Paulo Macedo	
22nd	2015	10 Jan, 2015	Palanca Negra, Malanje	Petro de Luanda (6)	88–75	Recreativo do Libolo	Lazare Adingono	
23nd	2016	10 Nov, 2015	Arena do Kilamba, Luanda	Recreativo do Libolo (2)	98–88	Petro de Luanda	Norberto Alves	
24th	2017	10 Nov, 2016	Cidadela, Luanda	Recreativo do Libolo (3)	91–66	Primeiro de Agosto	Hugo López	
25th	2018	9 November, 2017	Arena do Kilamba, Luanda	Interclube (1)	82–79	Benfica do Libolo	Alberto Babo	
26th	2019		Cidadela, Luanda	Petro de Luanda (7)	76–75	Primeiro de Agosto		
–	2020	Not played due to the coronavirus pandemic						
27th	2021	December 18, 2021	Cidadela, Luanda	Petro de Luanda (8)	98–90	Primeiro de Agosto	José Neto	
28th	2022	October 16, 2022	Lubango	Petro de Luanda (9)		Primeiro de Agosto	José Neto	
29th	2023	November 12, 2023	Pavilhão Multiusos Acácias Rubras, Benguela	Petro de Luanda (10)	93–87	Interclube	José Neto	
30th	2024	November 24, 2024		Petro de Luanda (11)	93–61	Interclube	Sergio Valdeolmillos	

=== Performance by team ===
Five different teams have played the Super Cup thus far. Primeiro de Agosto holds the record for most titles with 12, while Petro de Luanda has appeared in the competition a record 19 times.

Results by team
Team	Won	Runners-up	Years won	Years runners-up
Primeiro de Agosto	12	5	2001, 2002, 2003, 2004, 2005, 2007, 2008, 2009, 2010, 2011, 2013, 2014	2006, 2017, 2019, 2021, 2022
Petro de Luanda	11	10	1994, 1995, 1996, 1997, 2006, 2015, 2019, 2021, 2022, 2023, 2024	2001, 2002, 2003, 2005, 2007, 2008, 2010, 2012, 2014, 2016
Recreativo do Libolo	3	3	2012, 2016, 2017	2011, 2013, 2015
ASA	3	1	1998, 1999, 2000	2009
Interclube	1	3	2018	2004, 2023, 2024

== Women's finals ==
Season	Edition	Date	Ref	Venue	Winner	Score	Runner-up	Coach
2001	6th	17 Mar, 2001		Anexo, Luanda	Desportivo da Nocal	64–53	Primeiro de Agosto	
2002	7th	3 Aug, 2002		Anexo, Luanda	Primeiro de Agosto	71–42	Desportivo Maculusso	(Angola) Apolinário Paquete
2003	8th				Primeiro de Agosto	–	Desportivo Maculusso	
2004	9th	7 Mar, 2004			Primeiro de Agosto			(Angola) Apolinário Paquete
2005	10th	11 Nov, 2004			Primeiro de Agosto		Interclube	(Angola) Apolinário Paquete
2006	11th	7 Mar, 2006		Anexo, Luanda	Primeiro de Agosto	70–39	Desportivo Maculusso	
2007	12th	17 Jan, 2007		Cidadela, Luanda	Interclube	65–63	Primeiro de Agosto	(Angola) Apolinário Paquete
2008	13th	1 Mar, 2008		Cidadela, Luanda	Primeiro de Agosto	48–43	Interclube	(Angola) Raúl Duarte
2009	14th	16 Dec, 2008		28 Fevereiro, Luanda	Primeiro de Agosto	87–44	Desportivo Maculusso	(Angola) Higino Garcia
2010	15th	7 Feb, 2010		P.Benfica, Lubango	Interclube	75–63	Primeiro de Agosto	(Angola) Apolinário Paquete
2011	16th	4 Nov, 2010		Cidadela, Luanda	Interclube	69–42	Primeiro de Agosto	(Angola) Apolinário Paquete
2012	17th	2 Feb, 2012		28 Fevereiro, Luanda	Interclube	74–34	Desportivo Maculusso	(Angola) Apolinário Paquete
2013	18th	5 Dec, 2012		28 Fevereiro, Luanda	Interclube	63–60	Primeiro de Agosto	(Angola) Apolinário Paquete
2014	19th	9 Nov, 2013		W.Mirabilis, Namibe	Interclube	62–56	Primeiro de Agosto	(Angola) Apolinário Paquete
2015	20th	9 Jan, 2015		Palanca Negra, Malanje	Primeiro de Agosto	77–74	Interclube	(Angola) Jaime Covilhã
2016	21st	10 Nov, 2015		Arena do Kilamba, Luanda	Interclube	59–48	Primeiro de Agosto	(Angola) Manuel Sousa
2017	22nd	10 Nov, 2016		Cidadela, Luanda	Interclube	59–52	Primeiro de Agosto	(Angola) Apolinário Paquete

=== Performance by team ===
Team	Won	Years won
Interclube	8	2006, 2009, 2010, 2011, 2012, 2013, 2016, 2017
Primeiro de Agosto	8	2002, 2003, 2004, 2005, 2007, 2008, 2014, 2015
Desportivo da Nocal	1	2001

== See also ==
- Taça de Angola
- Federação Angolana de Basquetebol
- Supertaça de Angola (football)
- Supertaça de Angola (handball)
- Supertaça de Angola (roller hockey)
