= 2006–07 Angola Basketball Super Cup =

2007 Angola Basketball Super Cup
- League: Angola Basketball Super Cup
- Sport: Basketball
- Duration: January 12, 2007; January 17, 2007
- Teams: 2
- TV partner: TPA1 (Angola) TPA Internacional (Worldwide) Supersport (Africa)

2007 Angola Basketball Super Cup
- Winners: Primeiro de Agosto; Interclube

Angola Basketball Super Cup seasons
- ← 2006 2008 →

The 2007 Angola Basketball Super Cup (14th edition) was contested by Petro Atlético, as the 2006 league champion and Primeiro de Agosto, the 2006 cup winner. Primeiro de Agosto was the winner, making it its 6th title.

The 2007 Women's Super Cup (12th edition) was contested by Primeiro de Agosto, as the 2006 women's league champion and Interclube, the 2006 cup runner-up. Interclube was the winner, making it its 1st title.

== 2007 Men's Super Cup ==
January 12, 2007
18:00 WAT

Report (in Portuguese)

| 1º de Agosto | 99–84 | Petro Atlético |
Scoring by quarter: 29-25, 23-24, 23-11, 24-24
| Pts: Kikas 22 | | Pts: Mílton, Crooks 19 |

Pavilhão da Cidadela, Luanda

== 2007 Women's Super Cup ==
January 17, 2007
18:00 WAT

Report (in Portuguese)

| Interclube | 65–63 | 1º de Agosto |
Scoring by quarter: 8-16, 18-8
| Pts: n/a | | Pts: n/a |

Pavilhão da Cidadela, Luanda

| 2007 Angola Men's Basketball Super Cup winner | 2007 Angola Women's Basketball Super Cup winner |
|---|---|
| Clube Desportivo Pimeiro de Agosto; 6th title | Grupo Desportivo Interclube; 1st title |

== See also ==
- 2007 Angola Basketball Cup
- 2007 BAI Basket
