= 2010–11 Angola Basketball Super Cup =

2011 Angola Basketball Super Cup
- League: Angola Basketball Super Cup
- Sport: Basketball
- Duration: November 25, 2010; November 4, 2010
- Teams: 2
- TV partner: TPA1 (Angola) TPA Internacional (Worldwide) Supersport (Africa)

2011 Angola Basketball Super Cup
- Winners: Primeiro de Agosto; Interclube

Angola Basketball Super Cup seasons
- ← 2010 2012 →

The 2011 Angola Basketball Super Cup (18th edition) was contested by Primeiro de Agosto, as the 2010 league champion and Recreativo do Libolo, the 2010 cup winner. Primeiro de Agosto was the winner, making it its 10th title.

The 2011 Women's Super Cup (16th edition) was contested by Interclube, as the 2010 women's league champion and Primeiro de Agosto, the 2010 cup runner-up. Interclube was the winner, making it its 4th title.

== 2011 Men's Super Cup ==
November 25, 2010
18:00 WAT

Report (in Portuguese)

1º de Agosto	77–66	R. do Libolo
Scoring by quarter: 15-8, 26-8, 6-30, 30-20
Pts: Kikas 22		Pts: Olímpio 19

Pavilhão da Cidadela, Luanda

== 2011 Women's Super Cup ==
November 4, 2010
16:00 WAT

Report (in Portuguese)

Interclube	69–42	1º de Agosto
Scoring by quarter: 12-15, 7-21
Pts: Sónia 17		Pts: Nacissela 11

Pavilhão da Cidadela, Luanda

2011 Angola Men's Basketball Super Cup winner	2011 Angola Women's Basketball Super Cup winner
Clube Desportivo Pimeiro de Agosto; 10th title	Grupo Desportivo Interclube; 3rd title

== See also ==
- 2011 Angola Basketball Cup
- 2011 BAI Basket
- 2011 Victorino Cunha Cup
