= 2011–12 Angola Basketball Cup =

2012 Angola Basketball Cup
- League: Angola Basketball Cup
- Sport: Basketball
- Duration: Abril 3–20, 2012; February 18–26, 2012
- Teams: 13 / 4
- TV partners: TPA1 (Angola); TPA Internacional (Worldwide); Supersport (Africa)

2012 Angola Basketball Cup
- Winners: Primeiro de Agosto; Interclube

Angola Basketball Cup seasons
- ← 2011 2013 →

== 2012 Angola Men's Basketball Cup ==
The 2012 Men's Basketball Cup was contested by 13 teams and won by Primeiro de Agosto, thus defending its title. The 2-leg final was played on April 17 and 20.

=== Preliminary rounds ===
Quarter-finals (Apr 4, 6, 2012)
Primeiro de Agosto | 105 | 69 | 174
Lusíadas | 48 | 49 | 97
Petro Atlético | 87 | 69 | 156
Recreativo do Libolo | 71 | 73 | 144
Interclube | 84 | 77 | 161
ASA | 83 | 71 | 154
Sporting de Cabinda | 20 | 20
CDUAN | 0 | 0

Semi-finals (Apr 11, ?, 2012)
Primeiro de Agosto | 98 | 71 | 169
Petro Atlético | 82 | 78 | 160
Interclube | 83 | 79 | 162
Sporting de Cabinda | 56 | 75 | 131

Finals (Apr 17, 20, 2012)
Interclube | 56 | 77 | 133
Primeiro de Agosto | 94 | 80 | 174

=== Semi-final ===
April 11, 2012
18:00 WAT

Report (in Portuguese)

| Interclube | 83–56 | Sp. Cabinda |
Scoring by quarter: n/a, n/a
| Pts: n/a | | Pts: n/a |

Pavilhão 28 de Fevereiro, Luanda

April 13, 2012
18:00 WAT

Report (in Portuguese)

| Sp. Cabinda | 76–90 | Interclube |
Scoring by quarter: n/a, n/a
| Pts: n/a | | Pts: n/a |

Pavilhão do Sporting de Cabinda, Cabinda

April 11, 2012
18:00 WAT

Report (in Portuguese)

| 1º de Agosto | 98–82 | Petro Atlético |
Scoring by quarter: 25-27, 21-20, 30-20, 21-15
| Pts: C.Almeida 17 | | Pts: C.Morais 25 |

Pavilhão do CODENM, Luanda

April 13, 2012
18:00 WAT

Report (in Portuguese)

| Petro Atlético | 78–71 | 1º de Agosto |
Scoring by quarter: 19-11, 17-20, 22-25, 20-15
| Pts: three players 12 | | Pts: R.Moore, 23 |

Pavilhão da Cidadela, Luanda

=== Final ===
April 17, 2012
18:00 WAT

Report (in Portuguese)

| Interclube | 56–94 | 1º de Agosto |
Scoring by quarter: 23-28, 14-24, 15-20, 4-22
| Pts: Mingas 13 | | Pts: Moore 25 |

Pavilhão 28 de Fevereiro, Luanda

April 20, 2012
18:00 WAT

Report (in Portuguese)

| 1º de Agosto | 80–77 (OT) | Interclube |
Scoring by quarter: 15-13, 20-12, 16-22, 21-25, Overtime: 8-5
| Pts: Moore 24 | | Pts: Mílton 22 |

Pavilhão do CODENM, Luanda

== 2012 Angola Women's Basketball Cup ==
The 2012 Women's Basketball Cup was contested by four teams, with the 2-leg cup finals decided by playoff, with Interclube winning the title.

Semifinals (Feb 20, 22, 2012)
Primeiro de Agosto | 66 | ? | 66
Maculusso | 49 | ? | 49
Interclube | 68 | ? | 68
Juventude de Viana | 37 | ? | 37

Final (Feb 24, 26, 2012)
Primeiro de Agosto | 52 | 69 | 121
Interclube | 57 | 83 | 140

| 2012 Angola Men's Basketball Cup winner | 2012 Angola Women's Basketball Cup winner |
|---|---|
| Clube Desportivo Pimeiro de Agosto; 13th title | Clube Desportivo Pimeiro de Agosto; 12th title |

== See also ==
- 2012 Angola Basketball Super Cup
- 2012 BAI Basket
- 2012 Victorino Cunha Cup
