= 2002–03 Angola Basketball Super Cup =

2003 Angola Basketball Super Cup
- League: Angola Basketball Super Cup
- Sport: Basketball
- Duration: February 4, 2003
- Teams: 2
- TV partner: TPA1 (Angola) TPA Internacional (Worldwide) Supersport (Africa)

2003 Angola Basketball Super Cup
- Winners: Primeiro de Agosto

Angola Basketball Super Cup seasons
- ← 2002 2004 →

The 2003 Angola Basketball Super Cup (10th edition) was contested by Primeiro de Agosto, as the 2002 league champion and Petro Atlético, the 2002 cup runner-up. Primeiro de Agosto was the winner, making its 3rd title.

The 2003 Women's Basketball Super Cup was contested by Primeiro de Agosto, as the 2002 Angolan women's league winner and Desportivo do Maculusso, the 2002 cup runner-up.

== 2003 Men's Super Cup ==
February 4, 2003
18:00 WAT

Report (in Portuguese)

1º de Agosto	93–71	Petro Atlético
Scoring by quarter: 24-13, 21-15, 21-21, 27-22
Pts: Lutonda 28		Pts: Víctor 16

Pavilhão da Cidadela, Luanda

== 2003 Women's Super Cup ==
18:00 WAT

Primeiro de Agosto	vs.	Desportivo do Maculusso
Scoring by quarter: n/a, n/a
Pts: n/a		Pts: n/a

2003 Angola Men's Basketball Super Cup winner	2003 Angola Women's Basketball Super Cup winner
Clube Desportivo Pimeiro de Agosto; 3rd title	Clube Desportivo Pimeiro de Agosto; 2nd title

== See also ==
- 2003 Angola Basketball Cup
- 2002 BAI Basket
