= Jornal Nacional (disambiguation) =

Jornal Nacional may refer to:

- Jornal Nacional (Angola), an Angolan national newscast on TPA
- Jornal Nacional, a Brazilian national newscast on Rede Globo
- Jornal Nacional (Portugal), a Portuguese national newscast on TVI
