= 2010–2011 Angola Basketball Cup =

2011 Angola Basketball Cup
- League: Angola Basketball Cup
- Sport: Basketball
- Duration: April 13–24, 2011; March 3, 8
- Teams: 12 / 2
- TV partners: TPA1 (Angola); TPA Internacional (Worldwide); Supersport (Africa)

2010 Angola Basketball Cup
- Winners: Recreativo do Libolo; Interclube

Angola Basketball Cup seasons
- ← 2010 2012 →

== 2011 Angola Men's Basketball Cup ==
The 2011 Men's Basketball Cup was contested by 12 teams. Recreativo do Libolo, beat Petro Atlético in the best of three games finals, to win its second straight cup title.

Quarterfinals (Mar 9, 11, 2011)
Recreativo do Libolo	88	98	186
Lusíadas	55	70	125
Primeiro de Agosto	78	87	165
ASA	58	58	116
Petro Atlético	94	97	191
Santos FC	58	70	128
Interclube	79	72	151
Sporting de Cabinda	77	68	145

Semifinals (Mar 15, 18, 2011)
Recreativo do Libolo	91	128	219
Primeiro de Agosto	100	93	193
Petro Atlético	78	92	170
Interclube	63	74	137

Finals (Apr 19, 22, 24, 2011)
Recreativo do Libolo	78	88	83	249
Petro Atlético	69	98	68	235

Apr 19, 2011
18:00 WAT

Report

Petro Atlético	69–78	R. do Libolo
Scoring by quarter: 16-17, 11-17, 25-19, 17-25
Pts: Kiala 18		Pts: Moore 19

Pavilhão da Cidadela, Luanda
Referees: Domingos Simão, Carlos Júlio, Francisco Tando

Apr 22, 2011
18:00 WAT

Report

Petro Atlético	99–88	R. do Libolo
Scoring by quarter: 15-21, 26-26, 23-23, 35-18
Pts: R.Nealy 38		Pts: Olímpio 22

Pavilhão da Cidadela, Luanda
Referees: Fernando Pacheco, António Bernardo, David Manuel

Apr 24, 2011
18:00 WAT

Report

R. do Libolo	83–68	Petro Atlético
Scoring by quarter: 21-20, 22-18
Pts: Moore 20		Pts: R.Nealy 19

Pavilhão da Cidadela, Luanda

== 2011 Angola Women's Basketball Cup ==
The 2011 Women's Basketball Cup was contested by four teams, with Interclube and Maculusso, playing for the title, at the best of three games, on November 10 and 12 2010, with Interclube winning the title by beating Maculusso 86-35 and 75-41.

Semifinals (Nov 6, 8, 2010)
Interclube	79	50	129
Primeiro de Agosto	55	47	102
Maculusso	59	52	111
Juventude de Viana	29	49	78

Final (Nov 10, 12, 2010)
Interclube	86	75	161
Maculusso	35	41	76

2011 Angola Men's Basketball Cup winner	2011 Angola Women's Basketball Cup winner
Clube Recreativo e Desportivo do Libolo; 2nd title	Grupo Desportivo Interclube; 2nd title

== See also ==
- 2010 Angola Basketball Super Cup
- 2010 BAI Basket
- 2010 Victorino Cunha Cup
