= 2011–12 Angola Basketball Super Cup =

2012 Angola Basketball Super Cup
- League: Angola Basketball Super Cup
- Sport: Basketball
- Duration: November 11, 2011; February 2, 2012
- Teams: 2
- TV partner: TPA1 (Angola) TPA Internacional (Worldwide) Supersport (Africa)

2012 Angola Basketball Super Cup
- Winners: Recreativo do Libolo; Interclube

Angola Basketball Super Cup seasons
- ← 2011 2013 →

The 2012 Angola Basketball Super Cup (19th edition) was contested by Recreativo do Libolo, as the 2011 league champion and Petro Atlético, the 2011 cup runner-up. Recreativo do Libolo was the winner, making it its 1st title.

The 2012 Women's Super Cup (17th edition) was contested by Interclube, as the 2011 women's league champion and Desportivo do Maculusso, the 2011 cup runner-up. Interclube was the winner, making it its 5th title.

== 2012 Men's Super Cup ==
November 11, 2011
18:00 UTC+1

Report (in Portuguese)

R. do Libolo	67–63	Petro Atlético
Scoring by quarter: n/a, n/a
Pts: R.Nealy 22		Pts: Ricardino 23

Pavilhão Serra Van-Dúnem, Huambo

== 2012 Women's Super Cup ==
February 2, 2012
18:00 UTC+1

Report (in Portuguese)

Interclube	74–34	Maculusso
Scoring by quarter: 29-27, 17-13, 25-14, 19-23
Pts: Astrida 12		Pts: Merciana, Marisa 12

Pavilhão 28 de Fevereiro, Luanda

2012 Angola Men's Basketball Super Cup winner	2012 Angola Women's Basketball Super Cup winner
Clube Recreativo Desportivo do Libolo; 1st title	Grupo Desportivo Interclube; 4th title

== See also ==
- 2012 Angola Basketball Cup
- 2012 BAI Basket
- 2012 Victorino Cunha Cup
