= 2015–16 Angola Basketball Super Cup =

2016 Angola Basketball Super Cup
- League: Angola Basketball Super Cup
- Sport: Basketball
- Duration: 10 November 2015; 9 January 2015
- Teams: 2
- TV partner: TPA2 (Angola) TPA Internacional (Worldwide)

2016 Angola Basketball Super Cup
- Winners: Recreativo do Libolo; Interclube

Angola Basketball Super Cup seasons
- ← 2015 2017 →

The 2016 Angola Basketball Super Cup (23rd edition) was contested by Petro Atlético, as the 2015 league champion and Recreativo do Libolo, the 2015 cup winner. Petro Atlético won its 6th title.

The 2016 Women's Super Cup (21st edition) was contested by Primeiro de Agosto, as the 2015 women's league champion and Interclube, the 2015 cup runner-up. (Primeiro de Agosto won the cup as well). Interclube was the winner, making it is's 7th title.

== 2016 Men's Super Cup ==
10 November 2015
18:00 UTC+1

Rec Libolo	98–88	Petro Atlético
Scoring by quarter: 23-18, 28-21, 27-32, 20-17
Pts: Mingas 26		Pts: Gerson 22

Pavilhão Multiusos do Kilamba, Luanda
Referees: Fernando Pacheco, Carlos Júlio, Bunga Pedro

== 2016 Women's Super Cup ==
10 November 2015
16:00 UTC+1

Interclube	59–48	1º de Agosto
Pts: Leia 19		Pts: Holmes 16

Pavilhão Multiusos do Kilamba, Luanda

2016 Angola Men's Basketball Super Cup winner	2016 Angola Women's Basketball Super Cup winner
Clube Recreativo Desportivo do Libolo; 2nd title Team roster: Agostinho Coelho, Benvindo Quimbamba, Bráulio Morais, Carlos Morais, Eduardo Mingas, Elmer Félix, Jonathan Wallace, Joseney Joaquim, Manda João, Mílton Barros, Olímpio Cipriano, Roberto Fortes, Roderick Nealy, Valdelício Joaquim, Vladimir Pontes, Zola Paulo; Head coach: Norberto Alves	Grupo Desportivo Interclube; 7th title Team roster: Angelina Golome, Astrida Vicente, Elsa Eduardo, Emanuela Mateus, Felizarda Jorge, Italee Lucas, Luzia Simão, Merciana Fernandes, Nadir Manuel, Ngiendula Filipe, Pauline Nsimbo, Rosemira Daniel, Sequoia Holmes; Head coach: Manuel Sousa Necas

== See also ==
- 2014 Victorino Cunha Cup
- 2015 Angola Basketball Cup
- 2015 BIC Basket
