= 2009–10 Angola Basketball Cup =

2010 Angola Basketball Cup
- League: Angola Basketball Cup
- Sport: Basketball
- Duration: April 13 – May 17, 2010; March 3, 8
- Teams: 12 / 2
- TV partner: TPA1 (Angola) TPA Internacional (Worldwide) Supersport (Africa)

2010 Angola Basketball Cup
- Winners: Recreativo do Libolo; Interclube

Angola Basketball Cup seasons
- ← 2009 2011 →

== 2010 Angola Men's Basketball Cup ==
The 2010 Men's Basketball Cup was contested by 8 teams and won by Recreativo do Libolo, to win its first title. The finals, at the best of three games, was played on May 11, 14 and 17.

Quarterfinals (Apr 13, 16, 2010)
Recreativo do Libolo	98	89	187
PROMADE	66	61	127
Petro Atlético	103	76	179
Interclube	88	67	155
Primeiro de Agosto	108	113	221
Desportivo da Huila	52	78	130
ASA	91	93	184
Lusíada	67	66	133

Semifinals (May 4, 7, 2010)
Recreativo do Libolo	96	76	172
Petro Atlético	85	83	168
Primeiro de Agosto	109	99	208
ASA	94	64	158

Finals (May 11, 14, 17, 2010)
Primeiro de Agosto	116	89	74	279
Recreativo do Libolo	80	92	76	248

May 11, 2010
18:00 WAT

Report

1º de Agosto	116–80	R. do Libolo
Scoring by quarter: 33-21, 26-19, 31-13, 26-27
Pts: Jordão 25		Pts: Leonel 15

Pavilhão do CODENM, Luanda

May 14, 2010
18:00 WAT

Report

R. do Libolo	92–89	1º de Agosto
Scoring by quarter: 24-13, 18-26, 22-23, 28-27
Pts: Olímpio 27		Pts: Ambrósio 16

Pavilhão da Cidadela, Luanda

== 2010 Angola Women's Basketball Cup ==
The 2010 Women's Basketball Cup was contested by Interclube and Primeiro de Agosto, at the best of three games, on March 3 and 8, with Interclube winning the title by beating Primeiro de Agosto 50-46 and 56-53.

Mar 3, 2010
18:00 WAT

1º de Agosto	46–50	Interclube

Pavilhão do CODENM, Luanda

Mar 8, 2010
18:00 WAT

Interclube	56–53	1º de Agosto

Pavilhão 28 de Fevereiro, Luanda

2010 Angola Men's Basketball Cup winner	2010 Angola Women's Basketball Cup winner
Clube Recreativo e Desportivo do Libolo; 1st title	Grupo Desportivo Interclube; 1st title

== See also ==
- 2010 Angola Basketball Super Cup
- 2010 BAI Basket
- 2010 Victorino Cunha Cup
