= Braz Macachi =

Angolan basketball player (born 2001)

No. 6 – Leyma Coruña
- Positions: Power forward, center
- League: LEB Oro

Personal information
- Born: 5 September 2001 (age 25) Cabinda, Angola
- Listed height: 2.02 m (6 ft 8 in)

Career history
- 2022–2024: Primeiro de Agosto
- 2024–2025: AD Galomar
- 2025–present: Coruña
Medals
Men's basketball
Representing Angola
AfroBasket
Gold medal – first place	2025 Angola

Braz Macachi (born 5 September 2001) is an Angolan professional basketball player who plays for Básquet Coruña of the LEB Oro and the Angola national team. He plays as power forward or center.

== Professional career ==
Macachi began his career in the Angolan Basketball League with Primeiro de Agosto. He was named to the All-League First Team in the 2023–24 season, after averaging 10.5 points and 9.8 rebounds per game. During the 2024–25 season, Macachi played in Portugal with AD Galomar of the Liga Portuguesa de Basquetebol (LPB), where he averaged 7.8 points per game in the league.

On 6 August 2025, Macachi signed a one-year contract with Spanish club Básquet Coruña of the LEB Oro.

== National team career ==
Macachi plays for the Angola men's national basketball team, who he has represented at AfroCan 2023 and AfroBasket 2025, where he won a gold medal.
