= 2012–13 Angola Basketball Super Cup =

2013 Angola Basketball Super Cup
- League: Angola Basketball Super Cup
- Sport: Basketball
- Duration: November 9, 2012; December 5, 2012
- Teams: 2
- TV partner: TPA1 (Angola) TPA Internacional (Worldwide) Supersport (Africa)

2013 Angola Basketball Super Cup
- Winners: Primeiro de Agosto; Interclube

Angola Basketball Super Cup seasons
- ← 2012 2014 →

The 2013 Angola Basketball Super Cup (20th edition) was contested by Recreativo do Libolo, as the 2012 league champion and Primeiro de Agosto, the 2012 cup winner. Primeiro de Agosto was the winner, making it is's 11th title.

The 2013 Women's Super Cup (18th edition) was contested by Interclube, as the 2012 women's league champion and Primeiro de Agosto, the 2012 cup runner-up. Interclube was the winner, making it is's 6th title.

== 2013 Men's Super Cup ==
November 9, 2012
18:00 UTC+1

Report (in Portuguese)

1º de Agosto	90–77	R. do Libolo
Scoring by quarter: 29-27, 17-13, 25-14, 19-23
Pts: n/a		Pts: n/a

Pavilhão do Sporting do Bié, Kuito

== 2013 Women's Super Cup ==
December 5, 2012
18:00 UTC+1

(in Portuguese)

Interclube	63–60	1º de Agosto
Scoring by quarter: 16-12, 7-19, 19-21, 21-8
Pts: Astrida, Luísa 11		Pts: Domitila 13

Pavilhão 28 de Fevereiro, Luanda

2013 Angola Men's Basketball Super Cup winner	2013 Angola Women's Basketball Super Cup winner
Clube Desportivo Pimeiro de Agosto; 11th title	Grupo Desportivo Interclube; 5th title

== See also ==
- 2013 Angola Basketball Cup
- 2013 BAI Basket
- 2013 Victorino Cunha Cup
