= 2003–04 Angola Basketball Super Cup =

2004 Angola Basketball Super Cup
- League: Angola Basketball Super Cup
- Sport: Basketball
- Duration: February 28, 2004
- Teams: 2
- TV partner: TPA1 (Angola) TPA Internacional (Worldwide) Supersport (Africa)

2004 Angola Basketball Super Cup
- Winners: Primeiro de Agosto

Angola Basketball Super Cup seasons
- ← 2003 2005 →

The 2004 Angola Men's Basketball Super Cup (11th edition) was contested by Primeiro de Agosto, as the 2003 league champion and Interclube, the 2003 cup runner-up. Primeiro de Agosto was the winner, making it is's 4th title.

The 2004 Angola Women's Basketball Super Cup (9th edition) was contested by Primeiro de Agosto, as the 2003 league champion and Interclube, the 2003 cup runner-up. Primeiro de Agosto was the winner, making it is's 4th title.

== 2004 Men's Super Cup ==
February 28, 2004
18:00 WAT

Report (in Portuguese)

1º de Agosto	97–71	Interclube
Scoring by quarter: n/a, n/a
Pts: n/a		Pts: n/a

Pavilhão da Cidadela, Cabinda

== 2004 Women's Super Cup ==
March 7, 2004
18:00 WAT

Interclube	vs.	1º de Agosto
Scoring by quarter: n/a, n/a
Pts: n/a		Pts: n/a

2004 Angola Men's Basketball Super Cup winner	2004 Angola Women's Basketball Super Cup winner
Clube Desportivo Pimeiro de Agosto; 4th title	Clube Desportivo Pimeiro de Agosto; 3rd title

== See also ==
- 2004 Angola Basketball Cup
- 2004 BAI Basket
