= Benjamim Romano =

Angolan basketball player (born 1969)

Petro Atlético
- Position: Point guard
- League: Angola Basketball League

Personal information
- Born: August 19, 1969 (age 57) Luanda, Angola
- Listed height: 190 cm (6.2 ft)
- Listed weight: 83 kg (183 lb)

Career information
- College: Eastern Michigan (1998–2002)

Career history
- n/a – 2003: Petro Atlético

Benjamim João Romano (born 19 August 1969 in Luanda) is a former Angolan basketball player. Romano played with the Angola national basketball team at the 1992 and 1996 Summer Olympics. In the 1992 Olympics, he appeared in one game and did not score a point. In the 1996 games, Romano played six games, scoring 14 points. On the club level, he played for Petro Atlético.
