= Wlademiro Romero =

Angolan basketball coach

Vlademiro Romero
- Coaching career: 1981–1999

Career history

Coaching
- 1981–1989: Ferroviário de Luanda
- 1981–1987: Angola
- 1995–1997: Angola
- 1989–1999: Petro Atlético
Medals
Men's basketball
Representing Angola
AfroBasket
Gold medal – first place	Algiers 1995	Angola
Bronze medal – third place	Dakar 1997	Angola

Wlademiro Romero, deceased 1999, was an Angolan basketball coach. Together with Victorino Cunha, he is considered to be a large contributor in Angola's dominance over the African basketball arena. Romero led the Angola National team to an African title, in 1995 but failed to repeat the feat in 1997, finishing third. He also coached the national team at the 1996 Summer Olympics.

Following a car crash in late 1999, Romero was evacuated to South Africa for treatment. However, he died in that same year as a result of complications from the accident.

For all his deeds towards Angolan basketball, the Angolan Basketball Super Cup was renamed in 2001 as Wlademiro Romero Super Cup.

== See also ==
- List of FIBA AfroBasket winning head coaches
- Victorino Cunha
- Wlademiro Romero Super Cup
