= 2013–14 Angola Basketball Super Cup =

2014 Angola Basketball Super Cup
- League: Angola Basketball Super Cup
- Sport: Basketball
- Duration: November 11, 2013; November 9, 2013
- Teams: 2
- TV partner: TPA2 (Angola) TPA Internacional (Worldwide)

2014 Angola Basketball Super Cup
- Winners: Primeiro de Agosto; Interclube

Angola Basketball Super Cup seasons
- ← 2013 2015 →

The 2014 Angola Basketball Super Cup (21st edition) was contested by Primeiro de Agosto, as the 2013 league champion and Petro Atlético, the 2013 cup winner. Primeiro de Agosto was the winner.

The 2014 Women's Super Cup (19th edition) was contested by Primeiro de Agosto, as the 2013 women's league champion and Interclube, the 2013 cup winner. Interclube was the winner, making it is's 7th title.

== 2014 Men's Super Cup ==
November 11, 2013
18:00 UTC+1

1º de Agosto	85–83	Petro Atlético
Scoring by quarter: 29-15, 15-23, 16-28, 25-17
Pts: Moore 17		Pts: R.Nealy 15

Pavilhão Welwitschia Mirabilis, Namibe

== 2014 Women's Super Cup ==
November 9, 2013
18:00 UTC+1

Interclube	62–56	1º de Agosto
Scoring by quarter: 16-15, 13-17, 19-13, 14-11
Pts: Lucas 20		Pts: Luísa 12

Pavilhão Welwitschia Mirabilis, Namibe
Referees: António Bernardo, Francisco Tando, Adriano Manuel

2014 Angola Men's Basketball Super Cup winner	2014 Angola Women's Basketball Super Cup winner
Clube Desportivo Pimeiro de Agosto; 12th title Team roster: Adilson Baza, Agostinho Coelho, Armando Costa, Cedric Isom, Edmir Lucas, Edson Ndoniema, Felizardo Ambrósio, Francisco Machado, Hermenegildo Santos, Islando Manuel, Joaquim Gomes, Mário Correia, Mutau Fonseca, Reggie Moore; Head coach: Paulo Macedo	Grupo Desportivo Interclube; 6th title Team roster: Ângela Cardoso, Angelina Golome, Astrida Vicente, Catarina Camufal, Elizabeth Mateus, Elsa Eduardo, Felizarda Jorge, Italee Lucas, Judite Queta, Meiya Tireira, Merciana Fernandes, Nadir Manuel, Ngiendula Filipe, Rosemira Daniel; Head coach: Apolinário Paquete

== See also ==
- 2014 Angola Basketball Cup
- 2014 BAI Basket
- 2014 Victorino Cunha Cup
