= 2005–06 Angola Basketball Super Cup =

2006 Angola Basketball Super Cup
- League: Angola Basketball Super Cup
- Sport: Basketball
- Duration: January 27, 2006; March 7, 2006
- Teams: 2
- TV partner: TPA1 (Angola) TPA Internacional (Worldwide) Supersport (Africa)

2006 Angola Basketball Super Cup
- Winners: Petro Atlético; Primeiro de Agosto

Angola Basketball Super Cup seasons
- ← 2005 2007 →

The 2006 Angola Basketball Super Cup (13th edition) was contested by Primeiro de Agosto, the 2005 league champion and Petro Atlético, the 2005 cup runner-up. Petro Atlético was the winner, making it its 5th title.

The 2006 Women's Super Cup (11th edition) was contested by Primeiro de Agosto, as the 2005 women's league champion and Desportivo do Maculusso, the 2005 Women's cup runner-up. Primeiro de Agosto was the winner.

== 2006 Men's Super Cup ==
January 27, 2006
18:00 WAT

Report (in Portuguese)

Petro Atlético	97–89	1º de Agosto
Scoring by quarter: 27-29, 26-23, 20-18, 24-19
Pts: C.Morais 23		Pts: C.Almeida 26

Pavilhão da Cidadela, Luanda

== 2006 Women's Super Cup ==
March 7, 2006
18:00 WAT

1º de Agosto	70–39	Maculusso
Scoring by quarter: n/a, n/a
Pts: n/a		Pts: n/a

Pavilhão Anexo, Luanda

2006 Angola Men's Basketball Super Cup winner	2006 Angola Women's Basketball Super Cup winner
Atlético Petróleos de Luanda; 5th title	Clube Desportivo Primeiro de Agosto; 5th title

== See also ==
- 2006 Angola Basketball Cup
- 2006 BAI Basket
