= Gustavo da Conceição =

Angolan basketball player (born 1957)

Personal information
- Born: March 8, 1957 (age 69) Luanda, Angola
- Position: Small forward

Career history
- 1º de Agosto
Medals
Men's basketball
Representing Angola
AfroBasket
Silver medal – second place	Alexandria 1983	Angola
Silver medal – second place	Abidjan 1985	Angola
Bronze medal – third place	Tunis 1987	Angola

Gustavo Dias Vaz da Conceição (born 8 March 1957 in Luanda) is a former Angolan basketball player. Conceição, a small forward, competed for Angola at the 1980 Africa Basketball championship, an event that marked Angola's debut in the African competition arena and at the 1986 FIBA World Championship.

He is a brother of Angola senior police officer Fernando Torres Vaz da Conceição a.k.a. Mussolo and of Aldemiro Justino de Aguiar Vaz da Conceição, a longtime spokesman for the President and now the President's secretary for Regional Affairs.

From December 2004 to December 2012, he served two terms as chairman of the Angolan Basketball Federation. As of May, 2005, Gustavo da Conceição has been serving a second term as chairman of the Angolan Olympic Committee. Conceição is also a member of the Angolan parliament for the ruling party MPLA.

== See also ==
- Angolan Basketball Federation
