= José António (basketball) =

Puerto Rican-Angolan basketball player

Jose Antonio
No. 9 – Petro de Luanda
- Position: Small forward
- League: Angolan Basketball League

Personal information
- Born: July 31, 1990 (age 36)
- Listed height: 6 ft 6 in (1.98 m)

Career information
- NBA draft: 2012: undrafted
- Playing career: 2011–present

Career history
- 2010–present: Petro de Luanda

Jose Antonio (born 31 July 1990) is an Angolan basketball player. He plays for Petro de Luanda of the Angolan Basketball League.

== Professional career ==
Jose Antonio plays for the Atlético Petróleos de Luanda. He participated in the 2018–19 Africa Basketball League where he averaged 5.5 points, 2.8 rebounds and 1 assists per game.

== National team career ==
Jose Antonio represented the Angola national basketball team at the 2019 FIBA Basketball World Cup in China, where he averaged 5.4 points, 1.4 rebound and 0.6 assists per game.
