= 2003 FIBA Africa Women's Clubs Champions Cup =

2003 FIBA Africa Champions Cup for Women
10th FIBA Africa Champions Cup for Women

Tournament details
- Host country: Mozambique
- Dates: October 29 – November 4, 2003
- Teams: 6 (from 53 federations)
- Venue: 1 (in 1 host city)

Final positions
- Champions: Nigeria (First Bank's 1st title; Nigeria's 1st title)

The 2003 FIBA Africa Club Championship for Women was the 10th FIBA Africa Women's Clubs Champions Cup, an international basketball tournament held in Maputo, Mozambique, from October 29 to November 4, 2003. The tournament, organized by FIBA Africa and hosted by Maxaquene, was contested by 6 clubs in a round-robin system.

First Bank ended the round-robin tournament with a 5–0 unbeaten record to win their first title and qualify for the 2004 FIBA Women's World League.

== Participating teams ==
(Democratic Republic of the Congo) Arc-en-Ciel
(Mali) Djoliba AC
(Nigeria) First Bank
(Mozambique) Maxaquene
(Angola) Primeiro de Agosto
(Democratic Republic of the Congo) Radi

== Schedule ==
| P | Team | M | W | L | PF | PA | Diff | Pts. |
|---|---|---|---|---|---|---|---|---|
| 1 | (Nigeria) First Bank | 5 | 5 | 0 | 366 | 292 | +74 | 10 |
| 2 | (Angola) Primeiro de Agosto | 5 | 4 | 1 | 340 | 277 | +63 | 9 |
| 3 | (Mozambique) Maxaquene | 5 | 3 | 2 | | | | 8 |
| 4 | (Democratic Republic of the Congo) Arc-en-Ciel | 5 | 2 | 3 | | | | 7 |
| 5 | (Mali) Djoliba AC | 5 | 1 | 4 | | | | 6 |
| 6 | (Democratic Republic of the Congo) Radi | 5 | 0 | 5 | | | | 5 |

=== Day 1 ===
30 October 2003

| 1º de Agosto (Angola) | 78–54 | (Mali) Djoliba |

Maputo

| Arc-en-Ciel (Democratic Republic of the Congo) | vs. | (Mozambique) Maxaquene |

Maputo

| First Bank (Nigeria) | 96–55 | (Democratic Republic of the Congo) Radi |

Maputo

=== Day 2 ===
31 October 2003

| Maxaquene (Mozambique) | vs. | (Mali) Djoliba |

Maputo

| First Bank (Nigeria) | 67–65 | (Democratic Republic of the Congo) Arc-en-Ciel |

Maputo

| Radi (Democratic Republic of the Congo) | 61–71 | (Angola) 1º de Agosto |

Maputo

=== Day 3 ===
1 November 2003

| 1º de Agosto (Angola) | 54–55 | (Nigeria) First Bank |

Maputo

| Arc-en-Ciel (Democratic Republic of the Congo) | 68–54 | (Mali) Djoliba |

Maputo

| Radi (Democratic Republic of the Congo) | 65–77 | (Mozambique) Maxaquene |

Maputo

=== Day 4 ===
3 November 2003

| Maxaquene (Mozambique) | 51–71 | (Angola) 1º de Agosto |

Maputo

| Djoliba (Mali) | 49–78 | (Nigeria) First Bank |

Maputo

| Arc-en-Ciel (Democratic Republic of the Congo) | vs. | (Democratic Republic of the Congo) Radi |

Maputo

=== Day 5 ===
4 November 2003

| 1º de Agosto (Angola) | 66–56 | (Democratic Republic of the Congo) Arc-en-Ciel |

Maputo

| Radi (Democratic Republic of the Congo) | vs. | (Mali) Djoliba |

Maputo

| Maxaquene (Mozambique) | 69–70 | (Nigeria) First Bank |

Maputo

== Final standings ==
| Qualified for the 2004 FIBA Women's World League |

| Rank | Team | Record |
|---|---|---|
| Gold medal | (Nigeria) First Bank | 5–0 |
| Silver medal | (Angola) Primeiro de Agosto | 4–1 |
| Bronze medal | (Mozambique) Maxaquene | 3–2 |
| 4 | (Democratic Republic of the Congo) Arc-en-Ciel | 1–4 |
| 5 | (Mali) Djoliba AC | 1–4 |
| 6 | (Democratic Republic of the Congo) Radi | 1–4 |

First Bank roster
Aisha Mohammed, Barbara Diribe, Ezinne James, Funmilayo Ojelabi, Joy Okoka, Mactabene Amachree, Mfon Udoka, Nguveren Iyorhe, Patricia Chukwuma, Perpetua Clement, Stella Ofurum, Coach: Ganiyu Otenigbagbe

== Awards ==
2003 FIBA Africa Women's Clubs Champions Cup

First Bank Basketball Club
1st title

Most Valuable Player
