= 2007–08 Angola Basketball Super Cup =

2008 Angola Basketball Super Cup
- League: Angola Basketball Super Cup
- Sport: Basketball
- Duration: March 4, 2008; March 1, 2008
- Teams: 2
- TV partner: TPA1 (Angola) TPA Internacional (Worldwide) Supersport (Africa)

2008 Angola Basketball Super Cup
- Winners: Primeiro de Agosto; Primeiro de Agosto

Angola Basketball Super Cup seasons
- ← 2007 2009 →

The 2008 Angola Basketball Super Cup (15th edition) was contested by Petro Atlético, as the 2007 league champion and Primeiro de Agosto, the 2007 cup runner-up. Primeiro de Agosto was the winner, making it its 7th title.

The 2008 Women's Super Cup (13th edition) was contested by Interclube, as the 2007 women's league champion and Primeiro de Agosto, the 2007 cup winner. Primeiro de Agosto was the winner, making it its 2nd title.

== 2008 Men's Super Cup ==
March 4, 2008
18:00 WAT

Report (in Portuguese)

1º de Agosto	71–69	Petro Atlético
Scoring by quarter: 19-20, 11-19, 23-14, 18-16
Pts: Olímpio 23		Pts: n/a

Pavilhão da Cidadela, Luanda

== 2008 Women's Super Cup ==
March 1, 2008
18:00 WAT

Report (in Portuguese)

1º de Agosto	48–43	Interclube
Scoring by quarter: 10-19, 20-9, 8-10, 10-5
Pts: Ernestina 15		Pts: Ngiendula, Judite 9

Pavilhão da Cidadela, Luanda

2008 Angola Men's Basketball Super Cup winner	2008 Angola Women's Basketball Super Cup winner
Clube Desportivo Pimeiro de Agosto; 7th title	Clube Desportivo Pimeiro de Agosto; 6th title

== See also ==
- 2008 Angola Basketball Cup
- 2008 BAI Basket
