= Petro de Luanda (basketball) =

Angolan basketball club

- 2024–25 Petro de Luanda basketball season
- Nickname: Os Petrolíferos; Os Tricolores
- Leagues: BAL; Angolan Basketball League
- Founded: 14 January 1980; 46 years ago
- Arena: Pavilhão da Cidadela
- Capacity: 6,873
- Location: Luanda, Angola
- Team colors: Blue, yellow and red
- President: Tomás Faria
- Head coach: Sergio Valdeolmillos
- Championships: List: 16× Angola League 15× Angola Cup 10× Angola Super Cup 2× African Champions Cup 1× Basketball Africa League
- Website: petroatletico.co.ao
Home	Away	Third

Atlético Petróleos de Luanda, commonly known as Petro de Luanda, is an Angolan basketball club based in Luanda. Established in 1976, the team is part of a multi-sports club which includes football and handball teams as well. It competes at the local level, in the Luanda Provincial Basketball Championship and in the Angola National Basketball Championship. Additionally, the club plays at the continental level, in the Basketball Africa League (BAL), which they have won in 2024.

Petro has been one of the most successful teams in Angola, having won the second most Angolan championships with 16 titles, trailing only Primeiro de Agosto, and sharing the record for most Angolan Cups with 14 cups. The team has won three continental titles as well, having won the FIBA African Champions Cup in 2006 and 2015, and the BAL in 2024.

== History ==
The Atlético Petróleos de Luanda club was founded on 14 January 1980 from the merger of three clubs, Grupo Sonangol, Clube Atlético de Luanda and Benfica de Luanda. The establishment was a result of business cooperation after the independence of Angola from colonisation by Portugal. Another reason was that the country's oil company aimed to reintegrate with the community through sports. The club started with football before later establishing its basketball section.

Petro de Luanda won its first Angolan Basketball League in 1989, which was followed by seven more championships, as well as six Angolan Cups, during the 1990s.

During the 2000s, Petro won the league championship in 2006 and 2007 but saw arch-rivals Primeiro de Agosto win most of the trophies this decade. On 26 November 2006, Petro de Luanda won its first-ever continental title after winning the 2006 FIBA Africa Clubs Champions Cup in Lagos. They beat Primeiro de Agosto in the final, and Mílton Barros was named the tournament MVP.

The 2010s were more balanced for the Angolan League in term of competition, with Petro winning the 2011, 2015 and 2019 title. On 19 December 2015, they won their second continental title after taking the 2015 FIBA Africa Clubs Champions Cup at home in Luanda. Under head coach Lazare Adingono, Petro defeated another Angolan team Rec do Libolo in the final. American point guard Manny Quezada received MVP honours.

As the champions of the 2018–19 national championship, Petro qualified for the inaugural season of the Basketball Africa League (BAL). The BAL was a new initiate co-organised by FIBA Africa and the NBA.

In September 2020, Petro announced the signing of Brazilian head coach José Neto. Under Neto, a period of domination on the national level began.

In the 2021–22 season, Petro won the triple crown; winning its 15th national title, the Angolan Cup and the Supercup. In all league games, Petro was unbeaten and had a 31–0 record including the playoffs. In the same season, Petro had another successful run in the BAL which ended with them losing the finals to US Monastir. Ahead of the finals, head coach José Neto won the inaugural BAL Coach of the Year award.

In 2023, Petro de Luanda won its 14th Angolan Cup, overtaking Primer de Agosto to become the club with the most cup titles in the country's history. In the following 2023–24 season, Petro struggled in the Kalahari Conference of the BAL with a 2–2 record. On March 20, 2024, Petro announced it had terminated its contract with José Neto, ending his four-year tenure as head coach. Sergio Valdeolmillos was hired as the team's new coach four days later. Under Valdeolmillos, Petro recovered and on June 1, 2024, won their first-ever BAL championship after defeating Al Ahly Ly from Libya in the final.

In the 2024–25 season, Petro once again won the national treble. In the 2025 BAL season, they advanced to a record-extending fifth semifinal, and made it to back-to-back finals after defeating Al Ittihad Alexandria from Egypt. Petro lost the final, however, to Al Ahli Tripoli from Libya.

== Honours ==
Honours		No.	Years
Leagues
Angolan Basketball League	Winner	18	1989, 1990, 1992, 1993, 1994, 1995, 1998, 1999, 2006, 2007, 2011, 2015, 2019, 2020–21, 2021–22, 2022–23, 2023–24, 2024–25
Angolan Basketball League	Runner-up	7	2000, 2001, 2003, 2004, 2008, 2009, 2017
Luanda Provincial Championship	Winner	2	2004, 2005
Luanda Provincial Championship	Runner-up	1	2012
Cups
Angola Cup	Winner	15	1990, 1991, 1994, 1996, 1997, 1998, 2000, 2001, 2004, 2007, 2013, 2014, 2022, 2023, 2025
Angola Cup	Runner-up	5	2002, 2006, 2009, 2011, 2016
Wlademiro Romero Super Cup	Winner	10	1994, 1995, 1996, 1997, 2006, 2015, 2019, 2021, 2022, 2023
Wlademiro Romero Super Cup	Runner-up	10	2001, 2002, 2003, 2005, 2007, 2008, 2010, 2012, 2014, 2016
Victorino Cunha Cup	Winner	1	2010
Victorino Cunha Cup	Runner-up	5	2012, 2017, 2018, 2019, 2021
International competitions
FIBA Africa Clubs Champions Cup	Winner	2	2006, 2015
FIBA Africa Clubs Champions Cup	Runner-up	6	1994, 1999, 2000, 2007, 2009, 2012
BAL	Winner	1	2024
BAL	Runners-up	2	2022, 2025
BAL	Third place	1	2021
BAL	Fourth place	1	2023
African Club Winners' Cup	Winner	0	–
African Club Winners' Cup	Runner-up	1	1998
International tournaments
Supertaça Compal	Winner	1	2012
Supertaça Compal	Runner-up	0	–

1980–2016

== Players ==
=== Current roster ===
The following is Petro de Luanda's roster for the pre-season of the 2023 BAL season.

Note: Flags indicate national team eligibility at FIBA-sanctioned events. Players may hold other non-FIBA nationalities not displayed.

Petro de Luanda roster
Players
Coaches

Pos.	No.	Nat.	Name	Ht.	Age
SG	0	(Angola)	Lucas, Edmir	1.93 m (6 ft 4 in)	33 – 15 July 1993
PG	1	(Angola)	Domingos, Gerson	1.78 m (5 ft 10 in)	30 – 16 April 1996
C	2	(Angola)	Moreira, Yanick	2.11 m (6 ft 11 in)	35 – 31 July 1991
SG	4	(Angola)	Cipriano, Olímpio	1.94 m (6 ft 4 in)	44 – 9 April 1982
PG	5	(Angola)	Dundão, Childe	1.67 m (5 ft 6 in)	28 – 17 May 1998
SG	6	(Angola)	Morais, Carlos	1.92 m (6 ft 4 in)	40 – 16 October 1985
SG	8	(Cape Verde)	Correia, Anderson (I)	1.95 m (6 ft 5 in)	28 – 30 October 1997
G	9	(Angola)	António, José	1.98 m (6 ft 6 in)	36 – 31 July 1990
G	10	(Ivory Coast)	Diabate, Solo	1.83 m (6 ft 0 in)	39 – 21 July 1987
SG	18	(Angola)	Gonçalves, Gerson	1.93 m (6 ft 4 in)	30 – 29 March 1996
C	11	(Angola)	Dó, Teotónio	2.05 m (6 ft 9 in)	32 – 20 March 1994
SF	12	(Angola)	Buiamba, Glofate	2.00 m (6 ft 7 in)	27 – 5 January 1999
PF	15	(Angola)	Gakou, Aboubakar	2.02 m (6 ft 8 in)	29 – 27 May 1997
C	13	(Angola)	Pedro, Jone	2.08 m (6 ft 10 in)	36 – 28 March 1990
F	24	(Angola)	Gouveia Alexandre, Ângelo	2.00 m (6 ft 7 in)	25 – 9 March 2001
C	23	(Angola)	João, Aldemiro	2.06 m (6 ft 9 in)	33 – 7 August 1993
PG	--	(Angola)	Neto, Aginaldo	1.85 m (6 ft 1 in)	20 – 29 April 2006
F	--	(Angola)	Bastos, Pedro	1.92 m (6 ft 4 in)	33 – 8 January 1993
SF	--	(United States)	Cummings, Markeith	1.98 m (6 ft 6 in)	37 – 21 December 1988
PG	--	(United States)	Nelson, Ant	1.93 m (6 ft 4 in)	37 – 20 October 1988
	--	(Angola)	Simao, Eduardo

Head coach

- (Brazil) José Neto

Assistant coach(es)

- (Angola) Anibal Moreira
- (Angola) Raul Duarte

Team manager

- (Angola) Artur Barros

Legend

- (C) Team captain
- (IN) Inactive
- (I) Import player
- Injured

- Roster
Updated: March 8, 2024

=== Notable players ===
Note: Flags indicate national team eligibility at FIBA-sanctioned events. Players may hold other non-FIBA nationalities not displayed.

Criteria

To appear in this section a player must have either:

- Set a club record or won an individual award while at the club
- Played at least one official international match for their national team at any time
- Played at least one official NBA match at any time.

(Angola)	Edmar Victoriano	F
(Angola)	Victor de Carvalho	SG
(Angola)	Benjamim Romano	PG
(Angola)	Carlos Morais	SG

== Staff ==
Name	Position
(Angola) Artur Barros	Vice-President of Basketball
(Angola) Diogo João	Director of Basketball
(Angola) João Carvalho	Head of Basketball Department
(Brazil) J. Neto	Head coach
(Angola) Benjamim Avô	Assistant coach

== Head coaches ==
Coach	Years	Trophies won
(Angola) Wlademiro Romero (18)	1989–1999	8× Angolan League (1989, 1990, 1992, 1993, 1994, 1995, 1998, 1999; 6× Angolan Cup 1990, 1991, 1994, 1996, 1997, 1998; 4× Angolan Supercup (1994, 1995, 1996, 1997)
(Angola) Paulo Jorge (1)	1999–May 2000	1× Angolan Cup (2000)
(Angola) Victorino Cunha (1)	Jun 2000–Feb 2001	1× Angolan Cup (2001)
(Angola) Nuno Teixeira (0)	Feb 2001–Sep 2002	–
(Angola) Raúl Duarte (1)	Sep 2002–Jun 2005	1× Angolan Cup 2004
(Angola) Alberto de Carvalho (5)	Jul 2005–Jul 2009	2× Angolan League (2006, 2007); 1× African Champions Cup (2006); 1× Angolan Cup (2007); 1× Angolan Supercup (2006)
(Portugal) Alberto Babo (1)	Aug 2009–May 2012	1× Angolan League (2011)
(Cameroon) Lazare Adingono (5)	May 2012–August 2020	2× Angolan League (2015, 2019); 1× African Champions Cup (2015); 2× Angolan Cup (2013, 2014); 1× Angolan Supercup (2015)
(Brazil) José Neto	September 2020–March 2024	3× Angolan League (2021, 2022, 2023); BAL runner-up (2022); third place (2021); 2× Angolan Cup (2022, 2023); 3× Angolan Supercup (2021, 2022, 2023)
(Spain) Sergio Valdeolmillos	March 2024 – present	Angolan League (2024); BAL champions (2024)

== Season by season ==
=== Angolan League ===
Season	Tier	League	Regular season					Playoffs	Taça de Angola	International competitions		Head coach
Season	Tier	League	Finish	Played	Wins	Losses	Win%	Playoffs	Taça de Angola	League	Result	Head coach
Petro de Luanda
2014–15	1	Angolan League	2nd	18	15	3	.833	Champions		FIBA ACC	Champions	Lazare Adingono
2015–16	1	Angolan League	3rd	18	14	4	.778	Third place	Runner-up	DNQ		Lazare Adingono
2016–17	1	Angolan League	3rd	26	19	7	.731	Runner-up	Runner-up	DNQ		Lazare Adingono
2017–18	1	Angolan League	2nd	32	26	6	.813	Runner-up		DNQ		Lazare Adingono
2018–19	1	Angolan League	1st	29	26	3	.897	Champions		ABL	Quarterfinalist	Lazare Adingono
2019–20	1	Angolan League	1st (Note: The 2019–20 league season was cancelled due to the COVID-19 pandemic, no champion was declared but Petro de Luanda qualified for the 2021 BAL season based on its first place after 14 played games.)	14	13	1	.929	Cancelled	Cancelled	N/A		Lazare Adingono
2020–21	1	Angolan League	1st	8	8	0	1.000	Champions	Semifinalist	BAL	Third place	José Neto
2021–22	1	Angolan League	1st	26	26	0	1.000	Champions	Winners	BAL	Runners-up	José Neto
2022–23	1	Angolan League	1st	24	23	1	.958	Champions	Winners	BAL	Fourth Place	José Neto
2022–23	1	Angolan League	1st	22	21	1	.955	Champions	Runners-up	BAL	Champions	Sergio Valdeolmillos

=== BAL ===
Season	League		Regular season					Postseason	Head coach	Captain
Season	League	Conference	Finish	Played	Wins	Losses	Win %	Postseason	Head coach	Captain
Petro de Luanda
2021	BAL	Group A	1st	3	3	0	1.000	Won quarterfinals (Salé) 79–72; Lost semifinal (Zamalek) 71–89; Won third place game (Patriots) 97–68	José Neto	Carlos Morais
2022	BAL	Nile	2nd	5	4	1	.800	Won quarterfinals (Salé) 102–89; Won semifinal (FAP) 88–74; Lost finals (Monastir) 72–83	José Neto	Carlos Morais
2023	BAL	Nile	1st	5	5	0	1.000	Won quarterfinals (ABC) 88–81; Lost semifinals (Douanes) 86–92; Lost third place game (Stade Malien) 65–73	José Neto	Carlos Morais
2024	BAL	Kalahari	2nd	4	2	2	.500	Lost seeding game (Monastir) 67–70; Won quarterfinals (Douanes) 66–65; Won semifinals (Cape Town) 96–86 OT; Won finals (Al-Ahly Ly) 107–94	Sergio Valdeolmillos	Childe Dundão
2025	BAL	Sahara	2nd	6	3	3	.500	Lost seeding game (APR) 57–75; Won quarterfinals (US Monastir) 95–84; Won semifinals (Al Ittihad) 96–74; Lost finals (Al-Ahly Tripoli) 67–88	Sergio Valdeolmillos	Childe Dundão
Season record				23	17	6	.739	1 conference title 1 BAL championship		
Playoffs record				17	10	7	.588	1 conference title 1 BAL championship		

== See also ==
- Petro Atlético Football
- Petro Atlético Handball
- Petro Atlético Roller Hockey
- BIC Basket
- Federação Angolana de Basquetebol
