= 2000–01 Angola Basketball Super Cup =

2001 Angola Basketball Super Cup
- League: Angola Basketball Super Cup
- Sport: Basketball
- Duration: February 10, 2001; March 17, 2001
- Teams: 2
- TV partner: TPA1 (Angola) TPA Internacional (Worldwide) Supersport (Africa)

2001 Angola Basketball Super Cup
- Winners: Primeiro de Agosto; Desportivo da Nocal

Angola Basketball Super Cup seasons
- ← 2000 2002 →

The 2001 Angola Basketball Super Cup (8th edition) was contested by Primeiro de Agosto, as the 2000 league champion and Petro Atlético, the 2000 cup winner. Primeiro de Agosto was the winner, gaining it its first title.

The 2001 Women's Super Cup (6th edition) was contested by Primeiro de Agosto, as the 2000 women's league champion and Desportivo da Nocal, the 2000 cup runner-up. Desportivo da Nocal was the winner.

== 2001 Men's Super Cup ==
February 10, 2001
18:00 WAT

Report (in Portuguese)

1º de Agosto	79–63	Petro Atlético
Scoring by quarter: 18-19, 18-21, 19-19, 24-4
Pts: n/a		Pts: Belarmino 20

Pavilhão da Cidadela, Luanda

== 2001 Women's Super Cup ==
March 17, 2001
18:00 WAT

Report (in Portuguese)

Desp. Nocal	64–53	1º de Agosto
Scoring by quarter: n/a, n/a
Pts: n/a		Pts: n/a

Pavilhão Anexo, Luanda

== See also ==
- 2000 Angola Basketball Cup
- 2000 BAI Basket
