= 2001–02 Angola Basketball Super Cup =

2002 Angola Basketball Super Cup
- League: Angola Basketball Super Cup
- Sport: Basketball
- Duration: February 16, 2002; August 3, 2002
- Teams: 2
- TV partner: TPA1 (Angola) TPA Internacional (Worldwide) Supersport (Africa)

2002 Angola Basketball Super Cup
- Winners: Primeiro de Agosto; Primeiro de Agosto

Angola Basketball Super Cup seasons
- ← 2001 2003 →

The 2002 Angola Basketball Super Cup (9th edition) was contested by Primeiro de Agosto, as the 2001 league champion and Petro Atlético, the 2001 cup winner. Primeiro de Agosto was the winner, making it is's 2nd title.

The 2002 Women's Super Cup (7th edition) was contested by Primeiro de Agosto, as the 2001 women's league champion and Maculusso, the 2001 cup runner-up. Primeiro de Agosto was the winner, making it is's 1st title.

== 2002 Men's Super Cup ==
February 16, 2002
18:00 WAT

Report (in Portuguese)

1º de Agosto	72–57	Petro Atlético
Scoring by quarter: n/a, n/a
Pts: n/a		Pts: n/a

Pavilhão do Sporting, Cabinda

== 2002 Women's Super Cup ==
August 3, 2002
18:00 WAT

Report (in Portuguese)

1º de Agosto	71–42	Maculusso
Scoring by quarter: 24-15, 10-13, 17-8, 20-6
Pts: Irene, Laura 15		Pts: Teresa 15

Pavilhão Anexo, Luanda

2002 Angola Men's Basketball Super Cup winner	2002 Angola Women's Basketball Super Cup winner
Clube Desportivo Pimeiro de Agosto; 2nd title	Clube Desportivo Pimeiro de Agosto; 1st title

== See also ==
- 2002 Angola Basketball Cup
- 2002 BAI Basket
