= Aníbal Moreira =

Angolan basketball player (born 1966)

Petro de Luanda
- Position: Assistant coach
- League: BIC Basket; Basketball Africa League

Personal information
- Born: September 17, 1966 (age 60) Luanda, Angola
- Listed height: 1.93 m (6 ft 4 in)
- Listed weight: 89 kg (196 lb)

Career information
- Playing career: 1981–2001
- Coaching career: 2001–present

Career history

Playing
- 1981–1987: Ferroviário de Luanda
- 1988–1990: Petro Atlético
- 1991–1999: Queluz
- 1999–2000: Vitória de Setúbal
- 2001: Primeiro de Agosto

Coaching
- 2001–2004: Primeiro de Agosto (U-16)
- 2005–2014: Primeiro de Agosto (Women's)
- 2009–present: Angola (Women's)
- 2014–?: Marinha de Guerra
- 2020–present: Petro de Luanda
Medals
Men's basketball
Representing Angola
FIBA Africa Championship
Gold medal – first place	Luanda 1989	Angola
Gold medal – first place	Cairo 1992	Angola
Gold medal – first place	Nairobi 1993	Angola
Gold medal – first place	Algiers 1995	Angola
Gold medal – first place	Luanda 1999	Angola
Silver medal – second place	Abidjan 1985	Angola
Bronze medal – third place	Tunis 1987	Angola
Bronze medal – third place	Dakar 1997	Angola
FIBA Africa Clubs Champions Cup
Gold medal – first place	Cairo 2004	1º de Agosto
Women's Basketball (as coach)
Representing Angola
FIBA Africa Championship for Women
Gold medal – first place	Bamako 2011	Angola
Gold medal – first place	Maputo 2013	Angola
Bronze medal – third place	Dakar 2007	Angola
Bronze medal – third place	Antananarivo 2009	Angola
Women's Clubs Champions Cup
Silver medal – second place	Maputo 2007	1º de Agosto
Silver medal – second place	Meknes 2013	1º de Agosto

Aníbal de Jesús Moreira (born 17 September 1966) is an Angolan retired basketball player and current coach. He is an assistant coach for Petro de Luanda.

== Playing career ==
He competed at the 1992, 1996 and 2000 Summer Olympics with the Angola national basketball team.
