= Alberto Babo =

Portuguese basketball coach (born 1947)

Personal information
- Born: 1 September 1947 (age 79) Portugal
- Position: Head coach

Career history

Coaching
- 2006–2009: FC Porto
- 2009–2012: Petro de Luanda
- 2013–2018: Interclube

Career highlights
- As coach: Angolan League champion (2011)

Alberto Babo (born 1 September 1947) is a Portuguese basketball coach. He was the coach of FC Porto, from 2006 to 2009.

In 2009, Babo moved to Petro de Luanda in Angola. He coached Interclube from 2013 until 2018.
