= 2009–10 Angola Basketball Super Cup =

2010 Angola Basketball Super Cup
- League: Angola Basketball Super Cup
- Sport: Basketball
- Duration: October 31, 2009; February 7, 2010
- Teams: 2
- TV partner: TPA1 (Angola) TPA Internacional (Worldwide) Supersport (Africa)

2010 Angola Basketball Super Cup
- Winners: Primeiro de Agosto; Interclube

Angola Basketball Super Cup seasons
- ← 2009 2011 →

The 2010 Angola Basketball Super Cup (17th edition) was contested by Primeiro de Agosto, as the 2009 league champion and Petro Atlético, the 2009 cup runner-up. Primeiro de Agosto was the winner, making it is's 9th title.

The 2010 Women's Super Cup (15th edition) was contested by Primeiro de Agosto, as the 2009 women's league champion and Interclube, the 2009 cup runner-up. Interclube was the winner, making it is's 3rd title.

== 2010 Men's Super Cup ==
October 31, 2009
18:00 WAT

Report (in Portuguese)

1º de Agosto	108–102	Petro Atlético
Scoring by quarter: n/a, n/a
Pts: n/a		Pts: n/a

Pavilhão da N.Sra do Monte, Lubango

== 2010 Women's Super Cup ==
February 7, 2010
16:00 WAT

Report (in Portuguese)

Interclube	75–63	1º de Agosto
Scoring by quarter: 15-15, 27-18, 15-20, 18-10
Pts: Felizarda 23		Pts: Astrida 15

Pavilhão do Benfica do Lubango, Lubango

2010 Angola Men's Basketball Super Cup winner	2010 Angola Women's Basketball Super Cup winner
Clube Desportivo Pimeiro de Agosto; 9th title	Grupo Desportivo Interclube; 2nd title

== See also ==
- 2009 Angola Basketball Cup
- 2009 BAI Basket
- 2010 Victorino Cunha Cup
