= 2008–09 Angola Basketball Super Cup =

2009 Angola Basketball Super Cup
- League: Angola Basketball Super Cup
- Sport: Basketball
- Duration: November 11, 2008; December 16, 2008
- Teams: 2
- TV partner: TPA1 (Angola) TPA Internacional (Worldwide) Supersport (Africa)

2009 Angola Basketball Super Cup
- Winners: Primeiro de Agosto; Primeiro de Agosto

Angola Basketball Super Cup seasons
- ← 2008 2010 →

The 2009 Angola Basketball Super Cup (16th edition) was contested by Primeiro de Agosto, as the 2008 league champion and ASA, the 2008 cup runner-up. Primeiro de Agosto was the winner, making it its eighth title.

The 2009 Women's Super Cup (14th edition) was contested by Primeiro de Agosto, as the 2008 women's league champion and Maculusso, the 2008 cup runner-up. Primeiro de Agosto was the winner, making it its third title.

== 2009 Men's Super Cup ==
November 11, 2008
18:00 WAT

Report (in Portuguese)

1º de Agosto	86–70	ASA
Scoring by quarter: 20-17, 26-13
Pts: Kikas 18		Pts: F.Abraão 20

Pavilhão da Cidadela, Luanda

== 2009 Women's Super Cup ==
December 16, 2008
18:00 WAT

Report (in Portuguese)

1º de Agosto	77–44	Maculusso
Scoring by quarter: 7-14, 22-6, 37-13, 21-11
Pts: Nacissela 24		Pts: n/a

Pavilhão 28 de Fevereiro, Luanda

2009 Angola Men's Basketball Super Cup winner	2009 Angola Women's Basketball Super Cup winner
Clube Desportivo Pimeiro de Agosto; 8th title	Clube Desportivo Pimeiro de Agosto; 7th title

== See also ==
- 2008 Angola Basketball Cup
- 2008 BAI Basket
