= Pavilhão Palanca Negra Gigante =

Pavilhão Palanca Negra
- Interactive map of Pavilhão Palanca Negra
- Location: Bairro Porco Russo, Malanje, Angola
- Coordinates: 15.209827°S 12.158867°E
- Owner: State-owned
- Capacity: 3000
- Surface: Hardwood
- Scoreboard: Electronic

Construction
- Opened: August 12, 2013
- General contractor: Omatapalo

The Pavilhão Palanca Negra is a state-owned multisports indoor arena located in Malanje, Angola. The 3000-seat arena features hardwood flooring, electronic scoreboard and a wide range of features that make it one of the most modern of its kind in Africa. It was built to host the 2013 Angola Roller Hockey President's Cup and is fit for such sports as Basketball, Handball, Volleyball and Roller Hockey.

The arena was named after the Palanca Negra Gigante (Giant sable antelope), an animal endemic to the region of Cangandala, in Angola's northern province of Malanje.
