= 2008–09 Angola Basketball Cup =

2009 Angola Basketball Cup
- League: Angola Basketball Cup
- Sport: Basketball
- Duration: February 3 – April 18, 2009; February 18 – 26 2009
- Teams: 13 / 4
- TV partner: TPA1 (Angola) TPA Internacional (Worldwide) Supersport (Africa)

2009 Angola Basketball Cup
- Winners: Primeiro de Agosto; Primeiro de Agosto

Angola Basketball Cup seasons
- ← 2008 2010 →

== 2009 Angola Men's Basketball Cup ==
The 2009 Men's Basketball Cup was contested by 13 teams and won by Primeiro de Agosto, thus defending its title. The 2-leg final was played on April 14 and 17, with a playoff match played on April 18 after both teams were tied with a win each.

=== Preliminary rounds ===
Semifinals
Feb 3 2009 28 Fev
Univ Lusíadas	80
Sporting de Luanda	64
Feb 3 2009 Anexo
Vila Clotilde	83
Imbondeiro	64

Final
Feb 17 2009 28 Fev / Feb 24 2009
Univ Lusíadas	109
Vila Clotilde	74

Final
Anexo
Univ Lusíadas
CDUAN

=== Final round ===
Quarterfinals (Mar 24, Apr 1, 2009)
Petro Atlético	101	86	187
CDUAN	67	71	138
ASA	94	98	192
Interclube	89	86	175
Recreativo do Libolo	97	58	155
PROMADE	58	65	123
Primeiro de Agosto	122	106	228
Desportivo da Huíla	54	60	114

Semifinals (Apr 7, 10, 2009)
Petro Atlético	20	?	20
ASA	0	?	0
Recreativo do Libolo	79	79	158
Primeiro de Agosto	88	75	163

Finals (Apr 14, 17, 18, 2009)
Petro Atlético	93	89	87	269
Primeiro de Agosto	106	75	89	270

== 2009 Angola Women's Basketball Cup ==
The 2009 Women's Basketball Cup was contested by four teams, with the 2-leg cup final, decided by playoff at the best of three games. Primeiro de Agosto was the winner.

Semi-finals (Feb 18, 19, 2009)
Interclube	73	90
Misto de Luanda	31	28
Primeiro de Agosto	78
Maculusso	47

Final (Feb 23, 25, 26, 2009)
Interclube	51	68	33
Primeiro de Agosto	52	49	50

2009 Angola Men's Basketball Cup winner	2009 Angola Women's Basketball Cup winner
Clube Desportivo Pimeiro de Agosto; 12th title	Clube Desportivo Pimeiro de Agosto; 11th title

== See also ==
- 2009 Angola Basketball Super Cup
- 2009 BAI Basket
- 2009 Victorino Cunha Cup
