= 2004–05 Angola Basketball Super Cup =

2005 Angola Basketball Super Cup
- League: Angola Basketball Super Cup
- Sport: Basketball
- Duration: January 30, 2005; November 11, 2004
- Teams: 2
- TV partner: TPA1 (Angola) TPA Internacional (Worldwide) Supersport (Africa)

2005 Angola Basketball Super Cup
- Winners: Primeiro de Agosto; Primeiro de Agosto

Angola Basketball Super Cup seasons
- ← 2004 2006 →

The 2005 Angola Basketball Super Cup (12th edition) was contested by Primeiro de Agosto, as the 2004 league champion and Petro Atlético, the 2004 cup winner. Primeiro de Agosto was the winner, making its 5th title.

The 2005 Women's Super Cup (10th edition) was contested by Primeiro de Agosto, as the 2004 women's league champion and Interclube, the 2004 cup runner-up. Primeiro de Agosto was the winner, making it is's 2nd title.

== 2005 Men's Super Cup ==
January 30, 2005
18:00 WAT

Report (in Portuguese)

1º de Agosto	97–82	Petro Atlético
Scoring by quarter: 26-22, 15-22, 20-09, 31-29
Pts: Muzadi 18		Pts: Selengue 17

Pavilhão do Sporting, Cabinda

== 2005 Women's Super Cup ==
November 11, 2004
18:00 WAT

Report (in Portuguese)

1º de Agosto	vs.	Interclube
Scoring by quarter: n/a, n/a
Pts: n/a		Pts: n/a

Pavilhão do CODENM, Luanda

2005 Angola Men's Basketball Super Cup winner	2005 Angola Women's Basketball Super Cup winner
Clube Desportivo Pimeiro de Agosto; 5th title	Clube Desportivo Pimeiro de Agosto; 4th title

== See also ==
- 2005 Angola Basketball Cup
- 2005 BAI Basket
