= 2002–03 Angola Basketball Cup =

2003 Angola Basketball Cup
- League: Angola Basketball Cup
- Sport: Basketball
- Duration: January 3–13, 2003
- Teams: / 4
- TV partner: TPA1 (Angola) TPA Internacional (Worldwide) Supersport (Africa)

2003 Angola Basketball Cup
- Winners: Primeiro de Agosto (Men's); Primeiro de Agosto (Women's)

Angola Basketball Cup seasons
- ← 2002 2004 →

The Angola Basketball Cup is a basketball tournament held each year in the African state of Angola. There are sections for men's and women's teams. In the 2002/3 season the women's tournament took place on 3–14 January 2003, and the men's tournament in early June of that year. In both sections the winning team was Primeiro de Agosto.

== 2003 Angola Men's Basketball Cup ==
Semifinals

Final (7 Jun 2003)
Primeiro de Agosto	91
Interclube	61

== 2003 Angola Women's Basketball Cup ==
The 2003 Women's Basketball Cup was contested by four teams, played under a preliminary round robin system, the top four of which qualified for the knockout rounds (semifinals and final) Primeiro de Agosto was the winner.

=== Preliminary rounds ===
==== Day 1 ====
January 3, 2003

1º de Agosto	vs.	Maculusso

Desp da Nocal	vs.	Interclube

==== Day 2 ====
January 5, 2003

1º de Agosto	59–45	Interclube

Maculusso	48–30	Desp da Nocal

==== Day 3 ====
January 7, 2003

Maculusso	46–47	Interclube

1º de Agosto	89–39	Desp da Nocal

==== Day 4 ====
January 8, 2003

Maculusso	63–53	1º de Agosto

Interclube	69–35	Desp da Nocal

==== Day 5 ====
January 10, 2003

Desp da Nocal	34–70	Maculusso

1º de Agosto	79–62	Interclube

=== Knockout round ===
Semi-finals (Jan 11, 2003)
Interclube	56
Maculusso	41
Desportivo da Nocal	31
Primeiro de Agosto	70

Final (Jan 13, 14, 2003)
Interclube
Primeiro de Agosto

2003 Angola Men's Basketball Cup winner	2003 Angola Women's Basketball Cup winner
Clube Desportivo Pimeiro de Agosto; 8th title	Clube Desportivo Pimeiro de Agosto; 5th title

== See also ==
- 2003 Angola Basketball Super Cup
- 2003 BAI Basket
