= 2001–02 Angola Basketball Cup =

2002 Angola Basketball Cup
- League: Angola Basketball Cup
- Sport: Basketball
- Duration: December 18 – 22, 2001
- Teams: 4
- TV partner: TPA1 (Angola) TPA Internacional (Worldwide) Supersport (Africa)

Angola Basketball Cup 2000-2001
- Winners: Primeiro de Agosto; Desportivo da Nocal

Angola Basketball Cup seasons
- ← 2001 2003 →

The 2001–02 Angola Basketball Cup was a basketball competition held by the Taça de Angola from December 18 to December 22, 2001.

== 2002 Men's Basketball Cup ==
The 2002 Men's Basketball Cup final was contested by Primeiro de Agosto and Petro Atlético with Primeiro winning the trophy by beating Petro 91–75.

== 2002 Women's Basketball Cup ==
The 2002 Women's Basketball Cup was contested by four teams in a round robin system with a playoff match between the two top teams. The final, on December 22, 2001, was played by Primeiro de Agosto and Desportivo do Maculusso.

=== Preliminary rounds ===
Dec 18, 2001

1º de Agosto	51–37	Interclube

Desp Nocal	46–41	Maculusso

Dec 19, 2001

Maculusso	54–59	1º de Agosto

Interclube	50–58	Desp Nocal

Dec 20, 2001

1º de Agosto	59–56	Desp Nocal

Interclube	38–66	Maculusso

=== Final ===
Dec 22, 2001

1º de Agosto	vs.	Maculusso

2002 Angola Men's Basketball Cup winner	2002 Angola Women's Basketball Cup winner
Clube Desportivo Pimeiro de Agosto; 7th title	Clube Desportivo Pimeiro de Agosto; 4th title

== See also ==
- 2002 Angola Basketball Super Cup
- 2002 BAI Basket
