= C.R.D. Libolo (basketball) =

Angolan defunct basketball club

- Nickname: Benfica do Libolo; Libolo
- Founded: 1942
- Dissolved: 2018
- History: C.R.D. Libolo (1942–2017); Sport Libolo e Benfica (2017–2018)
- Arena: Pavilhão do Dream Space
- Capacity: 6,000
- Location: Luanda, Angola
- Championships: 3 Angola League; 5 Angola Cup; 3 Angola Super Cup; 1 African Champions Cup
Home	Away

Clube Recreativo Desportivo do Libolo was an Angolan basketball club based in Libolo, Kwanza Sul province. Founded in 1942 the club's men's basketball team competed in the Angolan Basketball League as well as at continental level, at the annual African Basketball Club Champions League competitions. In its 76 years of existence, the club won the Angolan League three times, the Angolan Cup five times and the FIBA Africa Clubs Champions Cup once, in 2014.

The club was founded in 1942. While major local rivals Primeiro de Agosto, Petro de Luanda and Interclube have been competing since the mid 1980s, Libolo basketball, much like its football counterpart even though the club has been founded in the 1940s, (the club has been inoperative for many years due to financial reasons) was only been established in 2008 and yet, in a very short time, managed to achieve an outstanding performance in the local and African arena.

Logo of the club between 2017 and 2018 under the name Sport Libolo e Benfica.

In September 2017, all the club's assets and ownership rights were passed on to Sport Libolo e Benfica. The club changed its name accordingly. One year later, in September 2018, the basketball team was dissolved due to financial problems after failing to find new sponsors.

== Honours ==
Honours		No.	Years
Leagues
Angolan Basketball League	Winner	3	2012, 2014, 2017
Angolan Basketball League	Runner-up	5	2010, 2011, 2013, 2015, 2016
Cups
Angola Cup	Winner	5	2010, 2011, 2015, 2016, 2017
Angola Cup	Runner-up	1	2013
Wlademiro Romero Super Cup	Winner	3	2012, 2016, 2017
Wlademiro Romero Super Cup	Runner-up	4	2011, 2013, 2015, 2018
Victorino Cunha Cup	Winner	1	2013
Victorino Cunha Cup	Runner-up	2	2009, 2010
FIBA Africa Club Competitions
African Club Champions	Winner	1	2014
African Club Champions	Runner-up	2	2015, 2016
International Tournaments
Supertaça Compal	Winner	0	
Supertaça Compal	Runner-up	1	2011

== Head coaches ==
Nat	Name	Years			League	Champions	Cup	Super Cup
(Angola)	Raúl Duarte (3)	Sep 2008	–	Nov 2012	2012		2010, 2011	
(Portugal)	Luís Magalhães (0)	Nov 2012	–	Nov 2013				
(Portugal)	Norberto Alves (5)	Nov 2013	–	Aug 2016	2014	2014	2015, 2016	2016
(Spain)	Hugo López ()	Sep 2016	–	2018				
