= Apolinário Paquete =

Angolan basketball coach

Interclube
- Position: Head Coach
- League: Angola Basketball League

Personal information
- Born: Luanda, Angola

Career history

Coaching
- Primeiro de Agosto
- Interclube

Apolinário Paquete (born 16 April 1966) is an Angolan basketball coach. Paquete was the head coach of the Primeiro de Agosto women's basketball team as well as of the Angola women's national basketball team at the 2003 FIBA Africa Championship.

At present, he is the head coach of the Angolan women's basketball club Interclube.
