= Mílton Barros =

Angolan basketball player (born 1984)

Milton Barros
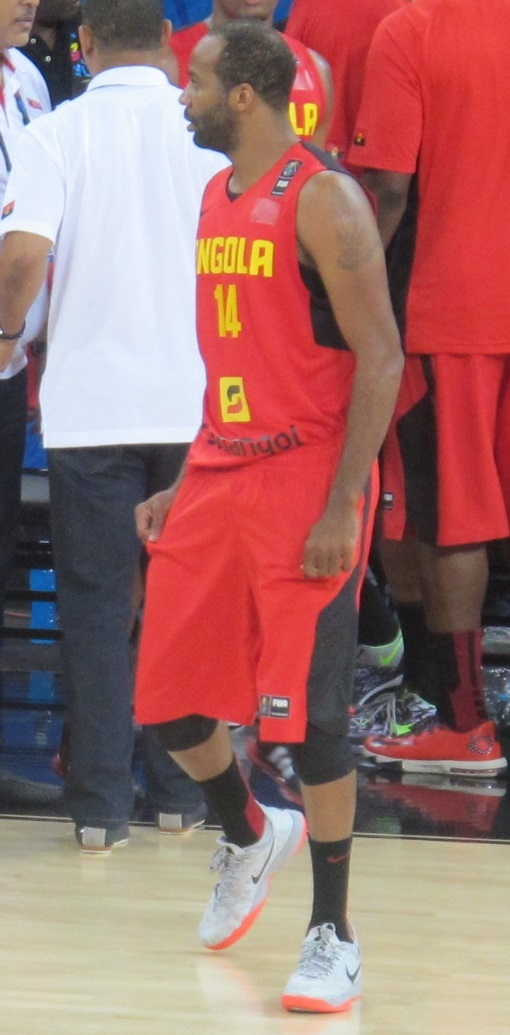
- Barros in 2014

Personal information
- Born: June 21, 1984 (age 42) Cacongo, Angola
- Listed height: 183 cm (6.00 ft)
- Listed weight: 75 kg (165 lb)

Career information
- Playing career: 2000–2019
- Position: Point guard

Career history
- 2000: Petro Atlético
- 2001–2003: Monção Basket Clube
- 2004–2009: Petro Atlético
- 2011: Recreativo do Libolo
- 2011–2014: Interclube
- 2014–2018: Benfica do Libolo
- 2018–2019: ASA

Career highlights
- 2006 FIBA Africa Clubs Championship MVP
Medals
Men's basketball
Representing Angola
AfroBasket
Gold medal – first place	Luanda 2007	National Team
Gold medal – first place	Abidjan 2013	National Team
Silver medal – second place	Antananarivo 2011	National Team
FIBA Africa Under-18 Championship
Silver medal – second place	Alexandria 2002	National Team
FIBA Africa Clubs Champions Cup
Gold medal – first place	Lagos 2006	Petro Atlético
Gold medal – first place	Tunis 2014	Rec do Libolo
Silver medal – second place	Luanda 2007	Petro Atlético
Silver medal – second place	Luanda 2015	Rec do Libolo

Mílton Lourenço Rosa Barros (born 21 June 1984) is an Angolan professional basketball player. He is also a member of the Angola national basketball team. He is 6 ft 1 in (1.85 m) in height and 86 kg (190 pounds) in weight. Internationally, Barros has represented Angola on several occasions, including the 2006 Lusophony Games, 2006 FIBA World Championship, 2007 African Championship and the 2008 Summer Olympics.

He is married to former handball player Elzira Tavares and a brother of Petro Atlético football player Manucho Barros.

He last played for ASA at the Angolan major basketball league BIC Basket.

== See also ==
- Angola national basketball team
