= G.D. Interclube (basketball) =

Interclube
- Nickname: Inter; Os Polícias
- League: Angolan Basketball League
- Founded: 28 February 1976; 49 years ago
- History: G.D. Interclube (1976–present)
- Arena: Pavilhão 28 de Fevereiro
- Capacity: 700
- Location: Luanda, Angola
- Team colors: Navy and Black
- President: Alexandre Canelas
- Vice-president: Edson Quixito
- Championships: 1 Angolan Cup; 1 Angola Super Cup
- Website: Official website
Home

Grupo Desportivo Interclube is an Angolan basketball club based in Luanda, in the Ponta Rocha neighbourhood. It is part of the mutisports club with the same name. The club's basketball teams (men and women) compete at the local level, at the Luanda Provincial Basketball Championships and at the Men's and Women's leagues as well as at continental level, at the annual African Basketball Club Champions League.

The Interclube men's team has won the Taça de Angola (Angolan Cup) in 2024.

== Interclube Men's Basketball ==
=== Honours ===
Honours		No.	Years
Leagues
Angolan Basketball League	Winner	0	0
Angolan Basketball League	Runner-up	4	2002, 2005, 2021, 2022
Cups
Angola Cup	Winner	1	2024
Angola Cup	Runner-up	4	2003, 2012, 2021, 2023
Wlademiro Romero Super Cup	Winner	1	2018
Wlademiro Romero Super Cup	Runner-up	1	2004
Victorino Cunha Cup	Winner	0	
Victorino Cunha Cup	Runner-up	2	2011, 2015
FIBA Africa Club Competitions
African Champions Cup	Winner	0	
African Champions Cup	Runner-up	1	2005
International Tournaments
Supertaça Compal	Winner	0	
Supertaça Compal	Runner-up	0	

=== Men's roster ===
Note: Flags indicate national team eligibility at FIBA-sanctioned events. Players may hold other non-FIBA nationalities not displayed.

Interclube Men's Basketball roster
Players
Coaches

Pos.	No.	Nat.	Name	Ht.	Wt.	Age
PG	2	(Angola)	Gerson Domingos	1.78 m (5 ft 10 in)		29 – 16 April 1996
	3	(Angola)	José Salvador
PG	4	(Angola)	Francisco Horácio	1.92 m (6 ft 4 in)	81 kg (179 lb)	46 – 9 January 1980
SF	6	(Angola)	Ngombo Rogério	2.02 m (6 ft 8 in)	92 kg (203 lb)	30 – 24 September 1995
SG	9	(Angola)	Paulo Barros	1.95 m (6 ft 5 in)		36 – 13 March 1989
PG	10	(Angola) (Canada)	Paulo Santana (C)	1.82 m (6 ft 0 in)	84 kg (185 lb)	41 – 28 April 1984
C	11	(Angola)	Miguel Kiala	2.04 m (6 ft 8 in)		35 – 10 November 1990
C	12	(Angola)	Abdel Gomes	2.03 m (6 ft 8 in)		36 – 21 May 1989
SG	13	(Angola)	Egídio Ventura			35 – 18 February 1990
C	14	(Angola)	André Miguel	1.98 m (6 ft 6 in)	99 kg (218 lb)	37 – 11 January 1989
	15	(Angola)	Goldafim Freitas			32 – 25 February 1993
	22	(Angola)	Alexandre Jungo	2.02 m (6 ft 8 in)		28 – 18 October 1997
C	23	(Angola)	Fidel Cabita	2.06 m (6 ft 9 in)		32 – 20 October 1993
SF	24	(Angola)	Adilson Ramos	1.79 m (5 ft 10 in)		36 – 20 April 1989
C		(Angola)	Eduardo Mingas	1.98 m (6 ft 6 in)	106 kg (234 lb)	47 – 29 January 1979

Head coach

- (Angola) Hélder Domingos

Assistant coach(es)

- (Angola) Manuel Martins

Team manager

- (Angola) António Camuloji

Legend

- (C) Team captain
- (I) Import player
- Injured

Updated as of June 27th, 2016

=== Depth chart ===
Pos.	Starting 5	Bench 1	Bench 2	Bench 3
C	Eduardo Mingas	Miguel Kiala	André Miguel
PF	Abdel Gomes	Alexandre Jungo
SF	Paulo Barros	Adilson Ramos	José António
SG	Egídio Ventura	Ngombo Rogério	Hélder Cristina
PG	Gerson Domingos	Paulo Santana	Romenig Sambo	Francisco Horácio

=== Staff ===
(Angola) Edson Quixito	Vice President for Basketball
(Angola) Raul Duarte	Head coach

=== Manager history ===
(Angola)	Raúl Duarte	2000	Sep 2002
(Angola)	Emanuel Guimarães	2003
(Angola)	Manuel Sousa Necas	Oct 2003	Sep 2008
(Angola)	Apolinário Paquete	Sep 2008	Sep 2009
(Portugal)	João Oliveira	Sep 2009	Jul 2010
(Angola)	José Carlos Guimarães	Jul 2010	May 2012
(Angola)	Alberto de Carvalho	May 2012	May 2013
(Portugal)	Alberto Babo		Jan 2018
(Angola)	Manuel Sousa Necas	Jan 2018	May 2018
(Angola)	Hélder Domingos	May 2018	-

G.D. Interclube
- Nickname: Inter; As Polícias
- Leagues: 12× Angola League; 6× Angola Cup; 8× Angola Super Cup; 5× African Champions Cup
- Founded: February 28, 1976 (49 years ago)
- History: 1976 - present
- Arena: Pavilhão 28 de Fevereiro (capacity: 700)
- Location: Luanda, Angola
- Team colors: Navy and Black
- President: Alves Simões
- Head coach: Apolinário Paquete
- Website: Official website

== Interclube Women's Basketball ==
Interclube holds the record of titles won in the African Basketball Club Champions League (5).

=== Honours ===
Honours		No.	Years
Leagues
Angola Women's League	Winner	12	1987, 1988, 1989, 1990, 1991, 2006, 2009, 2010, 2011, 2013, 2016, 2017
Angola Women's League	Runner-up	8	2000, 2001, 2005, 2007, 2008, 2012, 2014, 2015
Cups
Angola Cup	Winner	6	2010, 2011, 2012, 2013, 2016, 2017
Angola Cup	Runner-up	7	2003, 2006, 2007, 2008, 2009, 2014, 2015
Angola Super Cup	Winner	8	2007, 2010, 2011, 2012, 2013, 2014, 2016, 2017
Angola Super Cup	Runner-up	4	2004, 2005, 2008, 2015
FIBA Africa Club Competitions
African Champions Cup	Winner	5	2010, 2011, 2013, 2014, 2016
African Champions Cup	Runner-up	2	2012, 2015

=== Women's roster ===
Note: Flags indicate national team eligibility at FIBA-sanctioned events. Players may hold other non-FIBA nationalities not displayed.

Interclube Women's Basketball roster
Players
Coaches

Pos.	No.	Nat.	Name	Ht.	Wt.	Age
	4	(Angola)	Érica Guilherme			29 – 23 February 1996
C	5	(Angola)	Joana António			28 – 11 June 1997
PG	6	(Angola) (United States)	Italee Lucas	1.73 m (5 ft 8 in)		37 – 12 January 1989
SG	7	(Angola)	Merciana Fernandes	1.69 m (5 ft 7 in)		33 – 2 April 1992
SF	8	(Angola)	Rosemira Daniel	1.72 m (5 ft 8 in)		32 – 24 October 1993
SF	9	(Angola)	Astrida Vicente	1.77 m (5 ft 10 in)	69 kg (152 lb)	47 – 6 October 1978
SG	10	(United States)	Robyn Parks (I)	1.83 m (6 ft 0 in)		33 – 19 July 1992
PF	12	(Angola)	Nadir Manuel	1.85 m (6 ft 1 in)	79 kg (174 lb)	39 – 30 November 1986
SF	13	(Angola)	Felizarda Jorge	1.80 m (5 ft 11 in)	78 kg (172 lb)	40 – 23 February 1985
C	14	(Angola)	Angelina Golome	1.93 m (6 ft 4 in)		37 – 23 March 1988
PF	15	(Angola)	Ngiendula Filipe	1.80 m (5 ft 11 in)	72 kg (159 lb)	43 – 20 May 1982
PG	17	(Angola)	Luzia Simão	1.68 m (5 ft 6 in)	67 kg (148 lb)	33 – 20 February 1992
C	18	(Democratic Republic of the Congo)	Pauline Nsimbo (I)	1.86 m (6 ft 1 in)		44 – 9 January 1982
	20	(Angola)	Elsa Eduardo			36 – 23 July 1989

Head coach

- (Angola) Apolinário Paquete

Assistant coach(es)

- (Angola) Ana Lemos

Team manager

- (Angola) António Camuloji

Legend

- (C) Team captain
- (I) Import player
- Injured

Updated as of November 25, 2016

=== Depth chart ===
Pos.	Starting 5	Bench 1	Bench 2
C	Pauline Nsimbo	Angelina Golome
PF	Nadir Manuel	Ngiendula Filipe	Elizabeth Mateus
SF	Astrida Vicente	Felizarda Jorge	Rosemira Daniel
SG	Italee Lucas	Merciana Fernandes
PG	Robyn Parks	Luzia Simão

=== Staff ===
(Angola) Edson Quixito	Vice President for Basketball
(Angola) Apolinario Paquete	Head coach (Sep 2016 - )
(Angola) Fernades Figueiredo	Assistant coach

=== Manager history and performance ===
Name	Years			League	Champions	Cup	Super Cup
(Angola) Raúl Duarte	1987	–	1991				
(Angola) Raúl Duarte	2001	–	Oct 2002				
(Angola) Emanuel Guimarães	2003						
(Angola) Tó Ventura	Apr 2004						
(Angola) Santos Raúl	2004						
(Angola) Apolinário Paquete (18)	Jan 2006	–	Oct 2014	2006, 2009, 2010, 2011, 2013	2010, 2011, 2013	2010, 2011, 2012, 2013	2007, 2010, 2011, 2012, 2013, 2014
(Angola) Manuel Sousa Necas (1)	Oct 2014	–	Jan 2015		2014		
(Mozambique) Nasir Salé	Jan 2015	–	Aug 2015				
(Angola) Manuel Sousa Necas (1)	Sep 2015	–	Nov 2015				2016
(Angola) Apolinário Paquete (6)	Jan 2016	–		2016, 2017	2016	2016, 2017	2017

== See also ==
- Interclube Football
- Interclube Handball
- BIC Basket
- Federação Angolana de Basquetebol
