= C.D. Primeiro de Agosto (men's basketball) =

Primeiro de Agosto
- Nickname: D'Agosto; Os Rubro e Negros; Os Militares
- League: Angolan Basketball League
- Founded: 1 August 1977; 49 years ago
- Arena: Pavilhão Victorino Cunha
- Capacity: 1,500
- Location: Luanda, Angola
- Team colors: Crimson and Black
- President: Carlos Hendrick
- Head coach: Lazare Adingono
- Championships: 19 Angola League; 14 Angola Cups; 12 Angola Super Cups; 9 Africa Basketball Leagues
- Website: http://www.primeiroagosto.com/
| Home | Away | Third |

Clube Desportivo Primeiro de Agosto is an Angolan men's basketball team based in Luanda. The team is part of the multi-sports club with the same name. The club is attached to the Angolan Armed Forces which is its main sponsor. The team competes at the local level at the Luanda Provincial Basketball Championship and at the BIC Basket. In the past, it has played in the Africa Basketball League competitions.

Primeiro de Agosto is the most decorated team in Africa and holds the record for titles won in the African Basketball Club Champions League, with nine championships, their last one being in 2019.

== History ==
In 2002, the club set an all-time Angolan record by winning all domestic and continental competitions, including the 2002 Angola Super Cup, the Angolan league, the Luanda provincial championship, the 2002 Angola cup and the 2002 FIBA Africa Champions Cup, without conceding a single defeat in the entire season.

In 2019, Primeiro won its record ninth African title after defeating AS Salé in Luanda.

== Honours ==
| Honours | | No. | Years |
Leagues
| Angolan Basketball League | Winner | 19 | 1981, 1983, 1985, 1986, 1987, 1988, 1991, 2000, 2001, 2002, 2003, 2004, 2005, 2008, 2009, 2010, 2013, 2016, 2018 |
| Angolan Basketball League | Runner-up | 6 | 2006, 2007, 2011, 2012, 2014, 2023 |
Cups
| Angola Cup | Winner | 15 | 1985, 1986, 1987, 1988, 1992, 1995, 2002, 2003, 2005, 2006, 2008, 2009, 2012, 2018, 2021 |
| Angola Cup | Runner-up | 4 | 2004, 2007, 2014, 2015 |
| Wlademiro Romero Super Cup | Winner | 12 | 2001, 2002, 2003, 2004, 2005, 2007, 2008, 2009, 2010, 2011, 2013, 2014 |
| Wlademiro Romero Super Cup | Runner-up | 3 | 2006, 2019, 2021 |
| Victorino Cunha Cup | Winner | 9 | 2009, 2011, 2012, 2014, 2015, 2017, 2018, 2019, 2021 |
| Victorino Cunha Cup | Runner-up | 2 | 2010, 2013 |
FIBA Africa Club Competitions
| Africa Basketball League | Winner | 9 | 2002, 2004, 2007, 2008, 2009, 2010, 2012, 2013, 2019 |
| Africa Basketball League | Runner-up | 3 | 1987, 2006, 2011 |
International Tournaments
| Supertaça Compal | Winner | 1 | 2011 |
| Supertaça Compal | Runner-up | 1 | 2010 |

=== Current roster ===
Note: Flags indicate national team eligibility at FIBA-sanctioned events. Players may hold other non-FIBA nationalities not displayed.

As of 10 May 2022

Primeiro de Agosto roster
Players
Coaches

| Pos. | No. | Nat. | Name | Ht. | Wt. | Age |
|---|---|---|---|---|---|---|
| | 2 | (Angola) | Ambrósio, Wilson |
| PG | 3 | (United States) | Walker, Deshaunt |
| | 5 | (Angola) | Santos, Geraldo |
| | 7 | (Angola) | Ricardo, Juscelino |
| | 8 | (Angola) | Domingos, Tarcio |
| PF | 9 | (Angola) | Ambrosio, Felizardo | 2.01 m (6 ft 7 in) |
| C | 11 | (Angola) | Dò, Teotonio | 2.05 m (6 ft 9 in) | 98 kg (216 lb) | 32 – 20 March 1994 |
| PG | 16 | (Angola) | Santos, Hermenegildo | 1.89 m (6 ft 2 in) |
| | 17 | (Angola) | Quimbamba, Benvindo |
| PF | 18 | (Angola) | Manuel, Islando | 1.93 m (6 ft 4 in) |
| | 21 | (Angola) | Sebastião, Delcio |
| C | 23 | (Angola) | Cissé, Malick | 2.10 m (6 ft 11 in) | 101 kg (223 lb) |

Head coach

- (Angola) José Carlos Guimarães

Legend

- (C) Team captain
- (I) Import player
- Injured

- Roster
Updated: 10 May 2022

=== Staff ===
| Name | Position |
|---|---|
| (Angola) José Moniz | Vice President for Basketball |
| (Angola) Joaquim Gomes | Director for Basketball |
| (Angola) Carlos Antunes | Head of Basketball Dept |
| (Angola) Paulo Macedo | Head coach |
| (Angola) Aníbal Moreira | Assistant coach |
| (Angola) Miguel Lutonda | Assistant coach |

=== Former notable players ===
| (Angola) | Ângelo Victoriano | F/C |
| (Angola) | David Dias | F/C |
| (Angola) | Gustavo da Conceição | SF |
| (Angola) | Herlander Coimbra | PF |
| (Angola) | Jean-Jacques | PF |
| (Angola) | Manuel Sousa Necas | SG |
| (Angola) | Miguel Lutonda | PG |
| (Angola) | Paulo Macedo | PG |

== Head coaches ==
| Nat. | Name | From | To |
|---|---|---|---|
| (Angola) | Victorino Cunha | Jan 1979 | May 1998 |
| (Angola) | Fernando Barbosa | May 1998 | Dec 1998 |
| (Guinea-Bissau) (Portugal) | Mário Palma | Jan 1999 | Feb 2006 |
| (Angola) | Jaime Covilhã | Feb 2006 | Jan 2008 |
| (Portugal) | Luís Magalhães | Jan 2008 | May 2011 |
| (Angola) | Paulo Macedo | May 2012 | May 2015 |
| (Guinea-Bissau) (Portugal) | Mário Palma | Sep 2011 | May 2012 |
| (Spain) | Ricard Casas | Jun 2015 | Jun 2017 |
| (Angola) | Paulo Macedo | Jun 2017 | Jun 2020 |
| (Angola) | José Carlos Guimarães | 2021 | 2022 |
| (Cameroon) | Lazare Adingono | 2022 | present |

== See also ==
- C.D. Primeiro de Agosto (women's basketball)
- Primeiro de Agosto Football
- Primeiro de Agosto Handball
- Primeiro de Agosto Volleyball
- Primeiro de Agosto Roller Hockey
- BIC Basket
- Federação Angolana de Basquetebol
