= Pavilhão da Cidadela =

Indoor sporting arena in Luanda, Angola

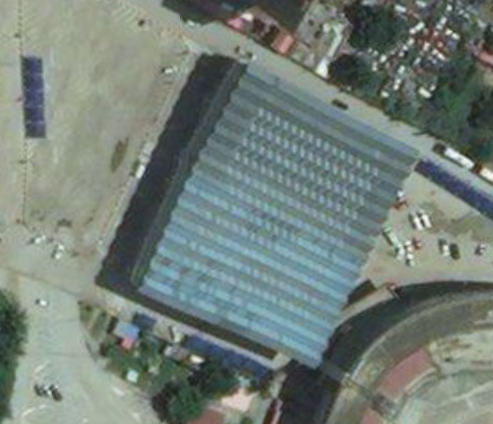
- Interactive map of Pavilhão da Cidadela
- Location: Complexo Desportivo da Cidadela; Luanda
- Coordinates: 8.826019°S 13.255271°E
- Owner: State-owned
- Capacity: 6,873
- Surface: Hardwood
- Scoreboard: Electronic

Tenant
- Petro de Luanda

Pavilhão da Cidadela is an Angolan indoor sporting arena located in Luanda, Angola. The capacity of the arena is 6,873 people. It is used to host the Atlético Petróleos Luanda and formerly of the Angola national basketball team before the appearance of Pavilhão Multiusos do Kilamba.

== 2013 stampede ==
The Pavilhão da Cidadela was the site of a deadly stampede on 1 January 2013 during a New Year vigil for believers of the Igreja Universal do Reino de Deus, which killed 10 people and injured over 120 more.

== See also ==
- Pavilhão Anexo
- Pavilhão Anexo II
