= Televisão Pública de Angola =

Public television broadcaster in Angola

- Official logo used since May 30, 2022.
- Company type: Public company, Commercial broadcaster
- Industry: Mass media
- Genre: broadcasting service
- Founded: 1973; 53 years ago as Radiotelevisão Portuguesa de Angola (RPA); 1976; 50 years ago as Televisão Popular de Angola (TPA); 1997; 29 years ago as Televisão Pública de Angola
- Headquarters: Luanda, Angola
- Area served: Angola
- Key people: Francisco Mendes, Chairman of the Board
- Services: Television and multimedia
- Owner: Government of Angola
- Website: www.tpaonline.ao

Televisão Pública de Angola E.P. (Public Television of Angola) or TPA is the national broadcaster of the Southern African state of Angola. It operates two generalist television channels (TPA 1 and TPA 2) and a news channel (TPA Notícias). TPA is headquartered in the capital city Luanda and broadcasts in the Portuguese language.

== History ==
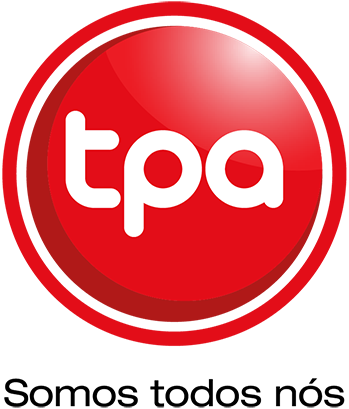
Logo until 2021

Logo from 2021 until 2022

Before the creation of TPA, some experiments were made in the colonial era of Angola: the first was made in 1962, from Rádio Clube do Huambo. On January 8, 1964, Rádio Clube de Benguela made the second experiment. In 1969, the Portuguese government is forced to recognize the urgence and need of the establishment of television services, in favor of the regime, at the short term. On June 22, 1970, Luanda tested television for the first time, with the attempt of televising the radio show Café da Noite. In 1972, there was also a proposal for TVA (which started in 1974) which failed, as the government had favored a television station set up by RTP.

Television, however, was seen as a taboo topic by the Portuguese colonialism of the time, in the sense that it boycotted, in every way, the need for the Angolan people to inform and educate. RTP's project for overseas television stations became an "on paper" project that ultimately never materialized.

It was founded on June 27, 1973, under the official designation of Radiotelevisão Portuguesa de Angola by the Portuguese colonial government authorities. The first terrestrial television signal was launched on October 18, 1975, in Luanda, a few weeks short of Angola's independence. The station was only picked up by a handful of television sets in the capital. Less than a year after the official launch and the country's independence, the company was nationalized and changed its name to Televisão Popular de Angola on June 25, 1976, by the new MPLA government.

In 1979, TPA began studying expansion thanks to the efforts of the party's ideologies, starting in Benguela that same year, with relays in the cities of Benguela and Lobito, then in 1981 in Huambo. It was in Huambo that the first regional production center was established. The strategic expansion of the network corresponded to the provinces where UNITA had more presence and the civil war of the time had far more destructive power. TPA's reach was still rather limited, in 1988, the country only had 40,500 television sets.

In 1982, TPA started producing programming in native languages, the first two being Malanje and N'Dalatando. Currently, the so-called "national mother tongues" have a special focus on news, of which there is a dedicated block on the main generalist channel.

Color television arrived in Angola in 1983.

In 1992, TPA expanded to the entire country thanks to satellite connections. On December 13, 1994, TPA set up TVC (Televisão Comercial de Angola) to administer advertising slots.

In the wake of redemocratization efforts following the Bicesse Agreements of 1991, in September 1997, TPA became a public company and the official name changed to Televisão Pública de Angola, per Decree-Law nº 66/97 of September 5.

TPA upgraded its equipment in 1999, ahead of the FIBA Africa Championship 1999, held in Luanda and Cabinda. The following year, the broadcaster upgraded its equipment to Betacam SX.

On August 15, 2000, TPA 2 started broadcasting regularly. Broadcasts only became official after two years, in both the capital and surrounding areas. In 2004, its reach extended to other provinces, among them Cabinda, Benguela, Huambo and Huíla. It was restructured in late January 2008, bringing new graphics, and a new programming grid, which remained on air until December 31, 2017.

In 2003, TPA channels started broadcasting through the KU band, launching the channels on the international African platform, DStv.

By the mid-2000s, 60% of TPA's programming was national. The soap opera Reviravolta, lasting 100 episodes, was recorded by a team consisting almost exclusively of Angolans. Brazilian teams sent their know-how to local professionals.

On January 31, 2007, TPA began broadcasting 24 hours a day.

On July 24, 2008, TPA international was launched and became available on the main cable and IPTV platforms in Portugal and in other countries.

On May 30, 2022, TPA changed its broadcasting system from SD to HD, after 46 years of use. In addition, renovations were inaugurated at the Camama Program Production Center, with a Content Center and Complex named after Ernesto Bartolomeu, the acclaimed Angolan journalist who has been working since 1984. In addition, this center has a studio in 'chroma key' format, has a new studio for information services. On July 18, 2022, the first news channel in the country, TPA Notícias, was inaugurated.

== Channels ==
=== TPA 1 ===
TPA1

TPA 1 is the main and generalist channel and sports. Until 2017 it was the only state-owned terrestrial television channel in Angola following the period where TPA2 was outsourced to Semba Comunicação and the arrival of private channels TV Zimbo and Palanca TV, both channels that later fell under the sphere of influence of the state.

=== TPA 2 ===
TPA2

TPA 2 the entertainment and culture channel for children, teenagers and adults. Coverage was initially limited to Luanda before extending to a national scale within a few years.

=== TPA Notícias ===
TPA Notícias is a channel for the exhibition of 24/7 news blocks, and also opinion debates, public utility information, documentaries or reports, etc. It's the first news channel in Angola, replacing the former TPA Internacional.

=== Previous ===
==== TPA Internacional ====
TPAi

TPA Internacional was the international service, replaced by TPA Notícias in July 2022. The channel was initially outsourced to Westside Investments, in association with Semba Comunicação, production company domiciled in both Portugal and Angola, with production assisted by Portuguese production company Até Ao Fim do Mundo, who designed the graphics for both TPA2 and Internacional. The channel provided a mix of content from TPA1 and TPA2. The public revealing of the channel was scheduled for 24 July 2008. The channel started broadcasting on 28 July 2008 on the ZON cable platform in Portugal.

TPA3

During the first few days of the 2022 TPA rebrand, it was known as TPA 3.

== See also ==
- Media in Angola
