= List of G.D. Interclube women's basketball players =

This article is about the list of Grupo Desportivo Interclube basketball players. Grupo Desportivo Interclube is an Angolan basketball club from Luanda, Angola and plays their home games at Pavilhão 28 de Fevereiro in Luanda. The club was established in 1976.

== 2011–2018 ==
G.D. Interclube women's basketball players 2011–2017
L/L = Angola league winner/runner-up; C/C = African champions cup winner/runner-up

Nat	#	Name	A	P	H	W	Apolinário Paquete				M.S.	A. Paquete		
Nat	#	Name	A	P	H	W	2011	2012	2013	2014	2015	2016	2017	2018
Nat	#	Name	A	P	H	W	LC	LC	LC	LC	LC	LC	–	–
(Angola)	⋅	Ângela Cardoso	36	⋅	1.80	⋅	⋅	⋅	⋅	18	11	⋅	⋅	⋅
(Angola)	14	Angelina Golome	29	C	1.93	⋅	⋅	2012	14	14	14	14	2017	⋅
(Angola)	9	Astrida Vicente	39	SF	1.77	69	⋅	2012	9	9	9	9	2017	⋅
(Angola)	⋅	Catarina Camufal	34	PG	1.68	67	⋅	2012	4	4	⋅	⋅	⋅	⋅
(Angola)	⋅	Celina da Conceição		⋅		⋅	⋅	2012	⋅	⋅	⋅	⋅	⋅	⋅
(United States)	⋅	Danielle Green		⋅		⋅	⋅	2012	⋅	⋅	⋅	⋅	⋅	⋅
(Angola)	21	Eduarda Gabriel	20	⋅	⋅	⋅	⋅	⋅	⋅	⋅	⋅	⋅	2017	⋅
(Angola)	⋅	Elizabeth Mateus	22	⋅	1.77	⋅	⋅	⋅	7	–	–	⋅	⋅	⋅
(Angola)	20	Elsa Eduardo	27	⋅	⋅	⋅	⋅	⋅	⋅	16	16	16	2017	⋅
(Angola)	19	Emanuela Mateus	19	SG	1.70	⋅	⋅	⋅	⋅	⋅	⋅	11	2017	⋅
(Angola)	4	Érica Guilherme	21	⋅	⋅	⋅	⋅	⋅	⋅	⋅	⋅	⋅	2017	⋅
(Angola)	13	Felizarda Jorge	32	SF	1.80	78	⋅	⋅	⋅	13	13	13	2017	⋅
(Angola)	⋅	Indira José	28	PG	1.72	⋅	⋅	⋅	10	⋅	⋅	⋅	⋅	⋅
(Angola)	6	Italee Lucas	28	PG	1.73	⋅	⋅	⋅	⋅	10	6	6	2017	⋅
(Angola)	5	Joana António	20	C	⋅	⋅	⋅	⋅	⋅	⋅	⋅	⋅	2017	⋅
(Angola)	⋅	Judite Queta	29	SF	1.86	⋅	⋅	2012	5	5	⋅	⋅	⋅	⋅
(Angola)	⋅	Luísa Tomás	28	C	1.92	84	⋅	2012	11	⋅	⋅	⋅	⋅	⋅
(Angola)	17	Luzia Simão	24	PG	1.68	67	⋅	2012	6	⋅	17	17	2017	⋅
(Mali)	⋅	Meiya Tireira	28	C	1.87	⋅	⋅	⋅	⋅	11	⋅	⋅	⋅	⋅
(Angola)	7	Merciana Fernandes	25	SG	1.69	⋅	⋅	⋅	⋅	7	7	7	2017	⋅
(Angola)	12	Nadir Manuel	24	PF	1.85	79	⋅	2012	12	12	12	20	2017	⋅
(Angola)	⋅	Neusa Afonso		⋅		⋅	⋅	2012	⋅	⋅	⋅	⋅	⋅	⋅
(Angola)	15	Ngiendula Filipe	35	PF	1.80	72	⋅	2012	15	15	15	15	2017	⋅
(Democratic Republic of the Congo)	18	Pauline Nsimbo	35	C	1.86	⋅	⋅	⋅	⋅	⋅	18	18	2017	⋅
(United States)	⋅	Rezina Taclemarian	24	PG	1.72	⋅	⋅	⋅	13	⋅	⋅	⋅	⋅	⋅
(United States)	10	Robyn Parks	25	SG	1.83	⋅	⋅	⋅	⋅	⋅	⋅	→	2017	⋅
(Angola)	8	Rosemira Daniel	24	SF	1.72	⋅	⋅	⋅	⋅	8	8	8	2017	⋅
(United States)	⋅	Sequoia Holmes	30	PG	1.78	70	⋅	⋅	⋅	⋅	10	10	→	⋅
(Angola)	⋅	Sónia Ndoniema	27	SF		⋅	⋅	2012	⋅	⋅	⋅	⋅	⋅	⋅
(United States)	⋅	Tierra Henderson	26	SG	1.78	⋅	⋅	2012	8	⋅	⋅	⋅	⋅	⋅
