= 2012 FIBA Africa Women's Clubs Champions Cup squads =

This article displays the rosters for the participating teams at the 2012 FIBA Africa Club Championship for Women.

== (Ivory Coast) Abidjan Basket Club ==
Abidjan Basket Club – 2012 FIBA Africa Women's Clubs Champions Cup – Bronze medal roster
| Players | | | | | | | Coaches |
| Pos | # | Nat | Name | Height | Weight | Age | Head Coach |
| PF | 4 | (Ivory Coast) | Mariam Kone | 1.78 m (5 ft 10 in) | | 4 November 1991 (aged 20) | (Croatia) Igor Kovacevič |
| G | 5 | (Cameroon) | Solange Ebonji | 1.75 m (5 ft 9 in) | | 6 April 1987 (aged 25) |
| F | 6 | (Ivory Coast) | Fatou Traore | 1.72 m (5 ft 7 1/2 in) | | 16 May 1988 (aged 24) | Assistant coach(es) |
| PF | 7 | (Ivory Coast) | Fatou Diabate | 1.82 m (5 ft 11 1/2 in) | | 12 March 1975 (aged 37) | (Ivory Coast) Raoul Adjei |
| PF | 8 | (Ivory Coast) | Reine Kouadio | 1.77 m (5 ft 9 1/2 in) | | 8 March 1990 (aged 22) |
| G | 9 | (Ivory Coast) | Salimata Betre | 1.80 m (5 ft 11 in) | | 7 May 1989 (aged 23) |
| G | 10 | (Ivory Coast) | Louise N'goy | 1.73 m (5 ft 8 in) | | 27 November 1985 (aged 26) |
| PF | 11 | (Ivory Coast) | Awa Kamagate | 1.82 m (5 ft 11 1/2 in) | | 1 January 1989 (aged 23) |
| G | 12 | (Ivory Coast) | Aichata Diomande | 1.68 m (5 ft 6 in) | | 17 July 1988 (aged 24) |
| C | 14 | (Democratic Republic of the Congo) | Betty Tshiniangu | 1.88 m (6 ft 2 in) | | 5 January 1987 (aged 25) |
| F | 15 | (Ivory Coast) | Mamiky Cisse | 1.71 m (5 ft 7 1/2 in) | | 16 December 1991 (aged 20) |

== (Ivory Coast) Club Sportif d'Abidjan ==
Club Sportif d'Abidjan – 2012 FIBA Africa Women's Clubs Champions Cup – 5th place roster
| Players | | | | | | | Coaches |
| Pos | # | Nat | Name | Height | Weight | Age | Head Coach |
| G | 4 | (Ivory Coast) | Maimonatou Kolga | 1.65 m (5 ft 5 in) | | 7 April 1992 (aged 20) | Simon Guillou |
| PF | 5 | (Ivory Coast) | Karidja Traore | 1.92 m (6 ft 3 1/2 in) | | 29 May 1992 (aged 20) |
| G | 6 | (Ivory Coast) | Assétou Kolga | 1.70 m (5 ft 7 in) | | 24 April 1988 (aged 24) | Assistant coach(es) |
| F | 7 | (Ivory Coast) | Adja Kone | 1.75 m (5 ft 9 in) | | 21 March 1988 (aged 24) | (Ivory Coast) Joskan Kouakou |
| G | 8 | (Senegal) | Ndeye Sene | 1.62 m (5 ft 4 in) | | 18 January 1988 (aged 24) |
| PF | 9 | (Ivory Coast) | Edjime Djedjemel | 1.85 m (6 ft 1 in) | | 29 October 1988 (aged 23) |
| SG | 10 | (Ivory Coast) | Kani Kouyaté | 1.78 m (5 ft 10 in) | | 8 August 1990 (aged 22) |
| F | 11 | (Ivory Coast) | Amandine Bognigni | 1.86 m (6 ft 1 in) | | 10 July 1984 (aged 28) |
| C | 12 | (Mali) | Ramata Daou | 2.02 m (6 ft 7 1/2 in) | | 23 March 1988 (aged 24) |
| G | 13 | (Ivory Coast) | Yvonne Bognigni | 1.80 m (5 ft 11 in) | | 23 October 1992 (aged 20) |
| F | 14 | (Ivory Coast) | Mariama Kouyate | 1.80 m (5 ft 11 in) | | 18 June 1988 (aged 24) |
| C | 15 | (Ivory Coast) | Minata Fofana | 1.93 m (6 ft 4 in) | | 22 March 1986 (aged 26) |

== (Tunisia) Club Sportif Sfaxien ==
Club Sportif Sfaxien – 2012 FIBA Africa Women's Clubs Champions Cup – 6th place roster
| Players | | | | | | | Coaches |
| Pos | # | Nat | Name | Height | Weight | Age | Head Coach |
| F | 4 | (Tunisia) | Rahma Ksiaa | 1.67 m (5 ft 5 1/2 in) | | 19 August 1985 (aged 27) | (Tunisia) Khaled Saadoud |
| PF | 5 | (Tunisia) | Abir Kraiem | 1.77 m (5 ft 9 1/2 in) | | 28 November 1989 (aged 22) |
| F | 7 | (Tunisia) | Fatma Zagrouba | 1.77 m (5 ft 9 1/2 in) | | 21 February 1982 (aged 30) | Assistant coach(es) |
| F | 8 | (Tunisia) | Maroua Trabelsi | 1.71 m (5 ft 7 1/2 in) | | 12 March 1991 (aged 21) | (Tunisia) Salah Chaben |
| PF | 9 | (Tunisia) | Thouraya Adsi | 1.83 m (6 ft 0 in) | | 4 May 1982 (aged 30) |
| G | 10 | (Tunisia) | Sirine Tanazefti | 1.65 m (5 ft 5 in) | | 25 February 1984 (aged 28) |
| G | 11 | (Tunisia) | Siwar Khlifa | 1.66 m (5 ft 5 1/2 in) | | 11 January 1989 (aged 23) |
| C | 12 | (Mali) | Meiya Tireira | 1.86 m (6 ft 1 in) | | 15 April 1986 (aged 26) |
| F | 13 | (Tunisia) | Afef Essid | 1.74 m (5 ft 8 1/2 in) | | 30 May 1988 (aged 24) |
| PF | 14 | (Tunisia) | Hiba Kachouri | 1.80 m (5 ft 11 in) | | 11 February 1991 (aged 21) |
| C | 15 | (Tunisia) | Selma M'Nasria | 1.90 m (6 ft 3 in) | | 11 October 1986 (aged 26) |

== (Kenya) Eagle Wings ==
Eagle Wings – 2012 FIBA Africa Women's Clubs Champions Cup – 9th place roster
| Players | | | | | | | Coaches |
| Pos | # | Nat | Name | Height | Weight | Age | Head Coach |
| | 4 | (Kenya) | Sharon Okeyo | | | 4 October 1987 (aged 25) | (Kenya) Thomas Olumbo |
| | 5 | (Kenya) | Linda Nyikuli | 1.75 m (5 ft 9 in) | 80 kg (180 lb) | 20 July 1987 (aged 25) |
| | 6 | (Kenya) | Eunice Ouma | 1.68 m (5 ft 6 in) | 75 kg (165 lb) | 20 August 1978 (aged 34) | Assistant coach(es) |
| | 7 | (Kenya) | Samba Mjomba | 1.70 m (5 ft 7 in) | 67 kg (148 lb) | 30 August 1985 (aged 27) | [[]] |
| | 8 | (Kenya) | Lucy Machuma | 1.75 m (5 ft 9 in) | 66 kg (146 lb) | 18 February 1993 (aged 19) |
| | 9 | (Kenya) | Rebecca Sarange | 1.68 m (5 ft 6 in) | 76 kg (168 lb) | 12 October 1982 (aged 30) |
| | 10 | (Kenya) | Angela Okoth | 1.83 m (6 ft 0 in) | 62 kg (137 lb) | 8 August 1985 (aged 27) |
| | 11 | (Kenya) | Silalei Shani | 1.88 m (6 ft 2 in) | 75 kg (165 lb) | 14 December 1986 (aged 25) |
| | 12 | (Kenya) | Everlyne Nora | 1.83 m (6 ft 0 in) | 75 kg (165 lb) | 11 September 1983 (aged 29) |
| | 13 | (Kenya) | Susan Akinyi | | | 17 March 1992 (aged 20) |
| | 14 | (Kenya) | Denise Okoth | 1.75 m (5 ft 9 in) | 63 kg (139 lb) | 18 September 1989 (aged 23) |
| | 15 | (Kenya) | Brigid Nanzala | 1.85 m (6 ft 1 in) | 70 kg (150 lb) | 6 July 1983 (aged 29) |

== (Nigeria) First Bank ==
First Bank – 2012 FIBA Africa Women's Clubs Champions Cup – 8th place roster
| Players | | | | | | | Coaches |
| Pos | # | Nat | Name | Height | Weight | Age | Head Coach |
| | 4 | (Nigeria) | Sharon Ogharandulu | | | | (Nigeria) Aderemi Adewunmi |
| | 5 | (Nigeria) | Nwamaka Adibeli |
| | 6 | (Nigeria) | Evawere Atunuwa | | | | Assistant coach(es) |
| | 7 | (Nigeria) | Tamunomiete Whyte |
| | 8 | (Nigeria) | Funmilayo Ojela |
| | 9 | (Nigeria) | Catherine Nzekwe | | | 14 August 1986 (aged 26) |
| | 10 | (Nigeria) (United States) | Helen Ogunjimi |
| | 11 | (Nigeria) (United States) | Lilian Achimba |
| | 12 | (Nigeria) | Ayesha Barkley |
| | 13 | (Nigeria) | Aisha Mohammed | | | 21 October 1985 (aged 27) |
| | 14 | (Nigeria) | Juliet Chinyere | | | 1 November 1993 (aged 18) |
| | 15 | (Nigeria) | Blessing Amos |

== (Nigeria) First Deepwater ==
First Deepwater – 2012 FIBA Africa Women's Clubs Champions Cup – 7th place roster
| Players | | | | | | | Coaches |
| Pos | # | Nat | Name | Height | Weight | Age | Head Coach |
| | 4 | (Nigeria) | Adenike Aderinto | | | 8 April 1993 (aged 19) |
| | 5 | (Nigeria) | Upe Atosu | | | 21 April 1993 (aged 19) |
| | 6 | (Nigeria) | Elizabeth Chukwuma | | | 8 November 1993 (aged 18) | Assistant coach(es) |
| | 7 | (Nigeria) | Mary Chinweokwu | | | 10 October 1985 (aged 27) |
| | 8 | (Nigeria) | Nkechi Akashili | | | 22 February 1990 (aged 22) |
| | 10 | (Nigeria) | Blessing Dabor | | | 15 December 1993 (aged 18) |
| | 11 | (Nigeria) | Blessing Emmanuel |
| | 12 | (Nigeria) | Josette Anaswem | | | 17 November 1992 (aged 19) |
| | 13 | (Nigeria) | Magdalene Ukato | | | 12 February 1986 (aged 26) |
| | 14 | (Nigeria) | Keleshi Obasi | | | 7 December 1988 (aged 23) |
| | 15 | (Nigeria) | Rasheeda Ahmed | | | 17 November 1993 (aged 18) |

== (Angola) Interclube ==
G.D. Interclube – 2012 FIBA Africa Women's Clubs Champions Cup – Silver medal roster
| Players | | | | | | | Coaches |
| Pos | # | Nat | Name | Height | Weight | Age | Head Coach |
| | 4 | (Angola) | Catarina Camufal (C) | 1.68 m (5 ft 6 in) | 67 kg (148 lb) | 30 March 1980 (aged 32) | (Angola) Apolinário Paquete |
| | 5 | (Angola) | Judith Queta | 1.86 m (6 ft 1 in) | | 29 August 1985 (aged 27) |
| | 6 | (Angola) | Luzia Simão | 1.86 m (6 ft 1 in) | | 20 February 1992 (aged 20) | Assistant coach(es) |
| | 7 | (Angola) | Elizabeth Mateus | | | 30 July 1993 (aged 19) |
| | 8 | (United States) | Thierra Henderson | 1.78 m (5 ft 10 in) | | 6 May 1987 (aged 25) |
| | 9 | (Angola) | Astrida Vicente | 1.77 m (5 ft 9 1/2 in) | 69 kg (152 lb) | 6 October 1978 (aged 34) |
| | 10 | (Angola) | Indira José | 1.72 m (5 ft 7 1/2 in) | | 1 March 1985 (aged 27) |
| | 11 | (Angola) | Luísa Tomás | 1.92 m (6 ft 3 1/2 in) | 84 kg (185 lb) | 24 March 1983 (aged 29) |
| | 12 | (Angola) | Nadir Manuel | 1.85 m (6 ft 1 in) | 79 kg (174 lb) | 30 November 1986 (aged 25) |
| | 13 | (United States) | Rezina Taclemarian | 1.72 m (5 ft 7 1/2 in) | | 26 September 1989 (aged 23) |
| | 14 | (Angola) | Angelina Golome | 1.90 m (6 ft 3 in) | | 23 March 1988 (aged 24) |
| | 15 | (Angola) | Ngiendula Filipe | 1.80 m (5 ft 11 in) | 72 kg (159 lb) | 20 May 1982 (aged 30) |

== (Mozambique) Liga Muçulmana de Maputo ==
Liga Muçulmana de Maputo – 2012 FIBA Africa Women's Clubs Champions Cup – Gold medal roster
| Players | | | | | | | Coaches |
| Pos | # | Nat | Name | Height | Weight | Age | Head Coach |
| C | 4 | (Mozambique) | Clarisse Machanguana | 1.98 m (6 ft 6 in) | | 4 October 1973 (aged 39) | (Mozambique) Nazir Salé |
| G | 5 | (Mozambique) | Deolinda Ngulela | 1.71 m (5 ft 7 1/2 in) | | 18 April 1981 (aged 31) |
| F | 6 | (Mozambique) | Ingvild Mucauro | 1.74 m (5 ft 8 1/2 in) | | 12 September 1992 (aged 20) | Assistant coach(es) |
| G | 7 | (Mozambique) | Valerdina Manhonga | 1.70 m (5 ft 7 in) | | 26 December 1980 (aged 31) | (Mozambique) Dilar Dessai |
| F | 8 | (Mozambique) | Rute Muianga | 1.76 m (5 ft 9 1/2 in) | | 6 April 1983 (aged 29) | (Mozambique) Renata Kalile |
| G | 9 | (Mozambique) | Anabela Cossa | 1.72 m (5 ft 7 1/2 in) | | 7 April 1986 (aged 26) |
| F | 10 | (Mozambique) | Cátia Halar | 1.73 m (5 ft 8 in) | | 28 November 1982 (aged 29) |
| C | 11 | (Mozambique) | Leia Dongue | 1.97 m (6 ft 5 1/2 in) | | 24 May 1991 (aged 21) |
| C | 12 | (United States) | Jazz Covington | 1.87 m (6 ft 1 1/2 in) | | 13 April 1985 (aged 27) |
| G | 13 | (Mozambique) | Filomena Micato | 1.70 m (5 ft 7 in) | | 26 January 1986 (aged 26) |
| F | 14 | (Mozambique) | Odélia Mafanela | 1.85 m (6 ft 1 in) | | 14 April 1989 (aged 23) |
| F | 15 | (Senegal) | Aya Traore | 1.88 m (6 ft 2 in) | | 27 July 1983 (aged 29) |

== (Gabon) Ndella ==
Ndella BC – 2012 FIBA Africa Women's Clubs Champions Cup – 10th place roster
| Players | | | | | | | Coaches |
| Pos | # | Nat | Name | Height | Weight | Age | Head Coach |
| | 4 | (Gabon) | Audrey Obone | | | 4 December 1998 (aged 13) | Didier Gondjout |
| | 5 | (Gabon) | Cynthia Moussonda | | | 22 July 1984 (aged 28) |
| | 6 | (Gabon) | Djessie Mouinda | | | 19 April 1988 (aged 24) | Assistant coach(es) |
| | 7 | (Gabon) | Cyrielle Massounga | | | 9 August 1986 (aged 26) |
| | 8 | (Gabon) | Foxias Folake | | | 9 February 1991 (aged 21) |
| | 9 | (Italy) | Nelly Leyama | | | 29 January 1975 (aged 37) |
| | 10 | (Gabon) | Carine Anguiba | | | 8 April 1985 (aged 27) |
| | 11 | (Gabon) | Joyce Tsoungui | | | 24 December 1990 (aged 21) |
| | 12 | (Gabon) | Marthe Nyama | | | 24 April 1984 (aged 28) |
| | 13 | (Gabon) | Marilyne Aboghe | | | 18 June 1985 (aged 27) |
| | 15 | (Gabon) | Marlène Fouty | | | 30 March 1982 (aged 30) |

== (Angola) Primeiro de Agosto ==
Primeiro de Agosto – 2012 FIBA Africa Women's Clubs Champions Cup – 4th place roster
| Players | | | | | | | Coaches |
| Pos | # | Nat | Name | Height | Weight | Age | Head Coach |
| G | 4 | (Angola) | Fineza Eusébio | 1.78 m (5 ft 10 in) | 70 kg (150 lb) | 18 July 1990 (aged 22) | (Angola) Aníbal Moreira |
| G | 5 | (Angola) | Domitila Ventura | 1.63 m (5 ft 4 in) | | 28 November 1978 (aged 33) |
| G | 6 | (Angola) | Isabel Francisco | 1.81 m (5 ft 11 1/2 in) | 65 kg (143 lb) | 1 January 1980 (aged 32) | Assistant coach(es) |
| | 7 | (Angola) | Cláudia Dundão | | | 18 April 1990 (aged 22) |
| | 8 | (Portugal) (Angola) | Letícia André | | | 1 January 1989 (aged 23) |
| F | 9 | (Angola) | Madalena Felix | 1.79 m (5 ft 10 1/2 in) | 75 kg (165 lb) | 20 September 1989 (aged 23) |
| C | 10 | (Mozambique) | Deolinda Gimo | 1.90 m (6 ft 3 in) | | 15 August 1987 (aged 25) |
| | 11 | (Angola) | Felizarda Jorge | 1.80 m (5 ft 11 in) | 78 kg (172 lb) | 23 February 1985 (aged 27) |
| | 12 | (Angola) | Ana Gonçalves | 1.82 m (5 ft 11 1/2 in) | 79 kg (174 lb) | 3 January 1993 (aged 19) |
| PF | 13 | (Angola) | Nacissela Maurício | 1.86 m (6 ft 1 in) | 80 kg (180 lb) | 2 June 1980 (aged 32) |
| F | 14 | (Angola) | Ernestina Neto | 1.78 m (5 ft 10 in) | | 1 January 1979 (aged 33) |
| C | 15 | (Democratic Republic of the Congo) | Mireille Tshiyoyo | 1.88 m (6 ft 2 in) | | 25 November 1988 (aged 23) |
