= 2013 FIBA Africa Women's Clubs Champions Cup =

2013 FIBA Africa Champions Cup for Women
19th FIBA Africa Champions Cup for Women

Tournament details
- Host country: Morocco
- Dates: 22–29 November 2013
- Teams: 8
- Venue(s): 1 (in 1 host city)

Final positions
- Champions: Angola (Interclube's 3rd title; Angola's 4th title)

Tournament statistics
- MVP: (United States) Italee Lucas
- Top rebounds: (Cameroon) Hermine Guotué

Official website
- 2013 FIBA Africa Women's Clubs Champions Cup

The 2013 FIBA Africa Women's Clubs Champions Cup (19th edition), was an international basketball tournament held in Meknes, Morocco, from 22 to 29 November 2013. The tournament, organized by FIBA Africa and hosted by Club Omnisport De Meknès, was contested by 8 clubs split into 2 groups, all of which qualifying for the knock-out stage (quarter, semis and final).

The tournament was won by Interclube from Angola.

== Draw ==
Group A	Group B
(Morocco) Club Omnisport De Meknès (Nigeria) Dolphins B.C. (Angola) Primeiro de Agosto (Kenya) USIU Flames	(Kenya) Eagle Wings (Nigeria) First Deepwater (Angola) Interclube (Morocco) IR Tanger

== Preliminary rounds ==
Times given below are local UTC.

Qualified for the quarter-finals

=== Group A ===
	Teams	M	W	L	PF	PA	Diff	P
1.	(Angola) Primeiro de Agosto	3	3	0	232	150	+82	6
2.	(Kenya) USIU Flames	3	2	1	183	176	+7	5
3.	(Morocco) Club Omnisport De Meknès	3	1	2	194	234	-40	4
3.	(Nigeria) Dolphins B.C.	3	0	3	169	218	-49	3

22 November 2013
17:00

Boxscore

COD Meknès (Morocco)	61–77	(Kenya) USIU Flames
Scoring by quarter: 12-18, 17-20, 20-14, 12-25
Pts: four players 14; Rebs: Ngueko 14; Asts: Hamzaoui, Oualilou 2		Pts: Indasi 28; Rebs: Cham 9 Asts: Nyakweba 4

Salle Al Massira, Meknes

23 November 2013
15:00

Boxscore

1º de Agosto (Angola)	77–52	(Nigeria) Dolphins
Scoring by quarter: 14-4, 19-12, 21-19, 23-17
Pts: Tanucha 18; Rebs: Tanucha 10; Asts: three players 2		Pts: Sadiq 20; Rebs: Arowosafe 10; Asts: Sadiq 3

Salle Al Massira, Meknes

24 November 2013
15:30

Boxscore

USIU Flames (Kenya)	45–71	(Angola) 1º de Agosto
Scoring by quarter: 7-19, 17-11, 10-13, 11-28
Pts: Indasi 22; Rebs: Chan 13; Asts: Indasi, Myamuba 1		Pts: Tanucha 19; Rebs: Nacissela, Tanucha 9 Asts: I.Francisco 3

Salle Al Massira, Meknes

24 November 2013
19:30

Boxscore

Dolphins (Nigeria)	73–80	(Morocco) COD Meknès
Scoring by quarter: 27-25, 16-21, 19-15, 11-19
Pts: Olaosebikan 19; Rebs: Bhadmus 10; Asts: Sadiq 3		Pts: Daou 28; Rebs: Daou 20; Asts: Oualilou 6

Salle Al Massira, Meknes

25 November 2013
14:00

Boxscore

USIU Flames (Kenya)	61–44	(Nigeria) Dolphins
Scoring by quarter: 20-12, 13-9, 19-8, 9-15
Pts: Indasi 23; Rebs: Nyakweba 11; Asts: Nyakweba 5		Pts: Obimoro 12; Rebs: Bhadmus 14; Asts: Olaosebikan 3

Salle Al Massira, Meknes

25 November 2013
18:00

Boxscore

COD Meknès (Morocco)	53–84	(Angola) 1º de Agosto
Scoring by quarter: 10-26, 12-15, 13-19, 18-24
Pts: Daou 23; Rebs: Ngueko 14; Asts: Tazi 3		Pts: Tanucha 21; Rebs: Tanucha 8 Asts: Tanucha 5

Salle Al Massira, Meknes

Qualified for the quarter-finals

=== Group B ===
	Teams	M	W	L	PF	PA	Diff	P
1.	(Angola) Interclube	3	3	0	221	110	+111	6
2.	(Nigeria) First Deepwater	3	2	1	198	178	+20	5
3.	(Kenya) Eagle Wings	3	1	2	170	177	-7	4
4.	(Morocco) IR Tanger	3	0	3	111	235	-124	3

24 November 2013
17:30

Boxscore

F. Deepwater (Nigeria)	39–65	(Angola) Interclube
Scoring by quarter: 5-15, 11-15, 13-21, 10-14
Pts: Akashili 11; Rebs: Udeaja 5 Asts: four players 4		Pts: Lucas 15; Rebs: Nadir 6 Asts: Lucas 3

Salle Al Massira, Meknes

24 November 2013
21:30

Boxscore

Eagle Wings (Kenya)	60–37	(Morocco) IR Tanger
Scoring by quarter: 17-7, 14-9, 10-8, 9-13
Pts: Sarange 13; Rebs: Nanzala, Akinyi 7 Asts: Ouma 5		Pts: Fatimazohra 12; Rebs: Adji 4 Asts: Kawtar 3

Salle Al Massira, Meknes

25 November 2013
16:00

Boxscore

F. Deepwater (Nigeria)	71–69	(Kenya) Eagle Wings
Scoring by quarter: 24-20, 22-18, 15-9, 10-10
Pts: Atosu 34; Rebs: Akashili 4 Asts: Atosu 5		Pts: Achieng 19; Rebs: Shani 11; Asts: Nora 7

Salle Al Massira, Meknes

22 November 2013
20:00

Boxscore

Interclube (Angola)	87–30	(Morocco) IR Tanger
Scoring by quarter: 20-13, 23-2, 21-7, 23-8
Pts: Tireira 13; Rebs: Angelina 12; Asts: Felizarda 5		Pts: Amal 8 Rebs: Kawtar 7 Asts: Addji 2

Salle Al Massira, Meknes

26 November 2013
17:00

Boxscore

IR Tanger (Morocco)	44–88	(Nigeria) F. Deepwater
Scoring by quarter: 15-18, 10-17, 10-29, 9-24
Pts: Zineb 15; Rebs: Zineb, Sanae 6 Asts: Zohra, Houda 1		Pts: Atosu 18; Rebs: Aderinto 7 Asts: Atosu, Akashili 2

Salle Al Massira, Meknes

26 November 2013
20:00

Boxscore

Interclube (Angola)	69–41	(Kenya) Eagle Wings
Scoring by quarter: 14-12, 19-8, 18-12, 18-9
Pts: Lucas 26; Rebs: Lucas 6 Asts: Lucas, Astrida 3		Pts: Nora, Mjomba 15; Rebs: Nora 9 Asts: Mjomba 4

Salle Al Massira, Meknes

== Knockout stage ==
Quarter-finals
27 November 2013 - 13:00
(Nigeria) Dolphins	35
(Angola) Interclube	92
27 November 2013 - 15:00
(Kenya) Eagle Wings	83
(Kenya) USIU Flames	66
27 November 2013 - 17:00
(Morocco) COD Meknès	61
(Nigeria) F. Deepwater	78
November 27, 19:00
(Morocco) IR Tanger	27
(Angola) 1º de Agosto	89

5th-8th Place
28 November 2013 - 13:00
(Nigeria) Dolphins	67
(Kenya) USIU Flames	72
28 November 2013 - 15:00
(Morocco) COD Meknès	63
(Morocco) IR Tanger	53

5th place
29 November 2013 - 12:30
(Kenya) USIU Flames	79
(Morocco) COD Meknès	63
7th place
29 November 2013 - 10:30
(Nigeria) Dolphins	59
(Morocco) IR Tanger	62

Quarter-finals
27 November 2013 - 13:00
(Nigeria) Dolphins	35
(Angola) Interclube	92
27 November 2013 - 15:00
(Kenya) Eagle Wings	83
(Kenya) USIU Flames	66
27 November 2013 - 19:00
(Morocco) IR Tanger	27
(Angola) 1º de Agosto	89
27 November 2013 - 17:00
(Morocco) COD Meknès	61
(Nigeria) F. Deepwater	78

Semi-finals
28 November 2013 - 19:00
(Angola) Interclube	76
(Kenya) Eagle Wings	50
28 November 2013 - 17:00
(Angola) 1º de Agosto	79
(Nigeria) F. Deepwater	53

Final
29 November 2013 - 17:00
(Angola) Interclube	61
(Angola) 1º de Agosto	60
Third place
29 November 2013 - 14:30
(Kenya) Eagle Wings	67
(Nigeria) F. Deepwater	64

=== Quarter-finals ===
27 November 2013
13:00

Boxscore

Dolphins (Nigeria)	35–92	(Angola) Interclube
Scoring by quarter: 8-24, 1-15, 8-22, 18-31
Pts: Olaosebikan 10; Rebs: Bhadmus 9 Asts: Isuambuk, Sadiq 1		Pts: Indira, Felizarda 16; Rebs: Ngiendula 11; Asts: E.Mateus 4

Salle Al Massira, Meknes

27 November 2013
15:00

Boxscore

Eagle Wings (Kenya)	83–66	(Kenya) USIU Flames
Scoring by quarter: 12-25, 26-15, 21-11, 24-15
Pts: Shani 18; Rebs: Nanzala 8 Asts: Mjomba 7		Pts: Nyakweba 30; Rebs: Irankunda 10; Asts: Otieno 4

Salle Al Massira, Meknes

27 November 2013
17:00

Boxscore

COD Meknès (Morocco)	61–78	(Nigeria) F. Deepwater
Scoring by quarter: 17-26, 9-20, 17-15, 18-17
Pts: Daou 20; Rebs: Guotué 11; Asts: Oualilou 5		Pts: Akashili 18; Rebs: Udeaja 6 Asts: Akashili 5

Salle Al Massira, Meknes

27 November 2013
19:00

Boxscore

IR Tanger (Morocco)	27–89	(Angola) 1º de Agosto
Scoring by quarter: 7-21, 7-21, 7-24, 6-23
Pts: Addji 9 Rebs: Addji, Hibatallah 4 Asts: Zohra 3		Pts: R.Gala, Tanucha 14; Rebs: Nacissela 8 Asts: R.Gala 5

Salle Al Massira, Meknes

=== 5th-8th place ===
28 November 2013
13:00

Boxscore

Dolphins (Nigeria)	67–72	(Kenya) USIU Flames
Scoring by quarter: 20-17, 12-18, 15-26, 20-11
Pts: Isuambuk 26; Rebs: Bhadmus 9 Asts: Olaosebikan 6		Pts: Chan 25; Rebs: three players 11; Asts: Nyakweba 8

Salle Al Massira, Meknes

28 November 2013
15:00

Boxscore

IR Tanger (Morocco)	56–63	(Morocco) COD Meknès
Scoring by quarter: 18-5, 13-22, 16-16, 9-20
Pts: Zohra 26; Rebs: Kawtar 11; Asts: Zineb 4		Pts: Guotué, Daou 19; Rebs: Guotué 15; Asts: Oualilou 3

Salle Al Massira, Meknes

=== Semifinals ===
28 November 2013
17:00

Boxscore

1º de Agosto (Angola)	79–53	(Nigeria) F. Deepwater
Scoring by quarter: 23-13, 24-12, 16-13, 16-13
Pts: Nacissela 25; Rebs: Sónia 6 Asts: Sónia 5		Pts: Ukato 23; Rebs: Dabor 5 Asts: Akashili 3

Salle Al Massira, Meknes

28 November 2013
19:00

Interclube (Angola)	76–50	(Kenya) Eagle Wings

Salle Al Massira, Meknes

=== 7th place ===
29 November 2013
10:30

Boxscore

IR Tanger (Morocco)	62–59	(Nigeria) Dolphins
Scoring by quarter: 16-13, 9-14, 22-17, 15-15
Pts: Addji 21; Rebs: Addji 12; Asts: Houda 7		Pts: Bhadmus 16; Rebs: Bhadmus 11; Asts: Olaosebikan 9

Salle Al Massira, Meknes

=== 5th place ===
29 November 2013
12:30

Boxscore

COD Meknès (Morocco)	63–79	(Kenya) USIU Flames
Scoring by quarter: 20-8, 8-24, 20-16, 15-31
Pts: Ngueko 19; Rebs: Daou 9 Asts: Ngueko, Hamzaoui 3		Pts: Chan 31; Rebs: Nyakweba 11; Asts: Indasi 7

Salle Al Massira, Meknes

=== Bronze medal game ===
29 November 2013
14:30

Boxscore

F. Deepwater (Nigeria)	64–67	(Kenya) Eagle Wings
Scoring by quarter: 15-20, 17-21, 11-9, 21-17
Pts: Ukato 17; Rebs: Udeaja 7 Asts: Atosu 4		Pts: Sarange 18; Rebs: Nora, Nanzala 6 Asts: Nora 6

Salle Al Massira, Meknes

=== Gold medal game ===
29 November 2013
17:00

Boxscore

1º de Agosto (Angola)	60–61	(Angola) Interclube
Scoring by quarter: 11-22, 27-15, 6-13, 16-11
Pts: Tanucha 24; Rebs: Tanucha 10; Asts: R.Gala 3		Pts: Lucas 23; Rebs: Ngiendula 7 Asts: Lucas, Camufal 2

Salle Al Massira, Meknes

== Final standings ==
Rank	Team	Record
Gold medal	(Angola) Interclube	6–0
Silver medal	(Angola) Primeiro de Agosto	5–1
Bronze medal	(Kenya) Eagle Wings	3–3
4.	(Nigeria) First Deepwater	3–3
5.	(Kenya) USIU Flames	4–2
6.	(Morocco) COD Meknès	2–4
7.	(Morocco) IR Tanger	1–5
8.	(Nigeria) Dolphins	0–6

Interclube roster
Angelina Golome, Astrida Vicente, Catarina Camufal, Elizabeth Mateus, Felizarda Jorge, Indira José, Italee Lucas, Judite Queta, Meiya Tireira, Merciana Fernandes, Nadir Manuel, Ngiendula Filipe Coach: Apolinário Paquete

== All Tournament Team ==
G	(United States)	Italee Lucas
F	(Angola)	Astrida Vicente
F	(Mozambique)	Leia Dongue
C	(Mali)	Meiya Tireira
C	(Mozambique)	Deolinda Gimo

2013 FIBA Africa Women's Clubs Champions Cup

Grupo Desportivo Interclube
3rd title

Most Valuable Player
(United States) Italee lucas

== See also ==
- 2013 FIBA Africa Championship for Women
