= List of C.D. Primeiro de Agosto women's basketball players =

C.D. Primeiro de Agosto is an Angolan basketball club based in Luanda, Angola and plays at Pavilhão Victorino Cunha. The club was established in 1977.

== 2011–2018 ==
C.D. Primeiro de Agosto women basketball players 2011–2016 L = Angola league winner; C = African champions cup winner
Nat	#	Name	A	P	H	W	Aníbal Moreira			Jaime Covilhã				
Nat	#	Name	A	P	H	W	2011	2012	2013	2014	2015	2016	2017	2018
Nat	#	Name	A	P	H	W		L	C	L	LC			
(Canada)	⋅	Adut Bulgak	25	C	1.93	71	⋅	⋅	⋅	⋅	⋅	→	21	⋅
(Angola)	14	Ana Gonçalves	23	PF	1.80	79	⋅	⋅	12	14	14	14	2017	⋅
(Angola)	⋅	Angela Cardoso	33	⋅	1.80	⋅	⋅	2012	⋅	⋅	⋅	⋅	⋅	⋅
(Angola)	18	Avelina Peso	18	PF	1.84	⋅	⋅	⋅	⋅	⋅	⋅	18	2017	⋅
(Democratic Republic of the Congo)	⋅	Bokomba Masela	43	⋅	⋅	⋅	⋅	2012	⋅	⋅	⋅	⋅	⋅	⋅
(Angola)	⋅	Cláudia Dundão	23	⋅	⋅	⋅	⋅	2012	7	⋅	⋅	⋅	⋅	⋅
(Angola)	12	Cristiana Correia	19	PF	1.85	⋅	⋅	⋅	⋅	⋅	⋅	12	2017	⋅
(Angola)	20	Cristina Matiquite	24	C	1.91	⋅	⋅	⋅	⋅	⋅	⋅	16	2017	⋅
(United States)	⋅	Danielle McCray	29	PG	1.80	77	⋅	⋅	⋅	⋅	⋅	⋅	21	⋅
(Angola)	⋅	Deolinda Gimo	26	C	1.90	⋅	⋅	2012	10	⋅	⋅	⋅	⋅	⋅
(Angola)	⋅	Domitila Ventura	35	PG	1.63	⋅	⋅	2012	6	⋅	⋅	⋅	⋅	⋅
(Angola)	⋅	Ernestina Neto	34	F	1.78	75	⋅	2012	14	⋅	⋅	⋅	⋅	⋅
(Angola)	⋅	Felizarda Jorge	28	PF	1.80	78	⋅	⋅	11	⋅	⋅	⋅	⋅	⋅
(Angola)	4	Fineza Eusébio	26	PG	1.68	70	⋅	2012	4	4	4	INJ	2017	⋅
(Angola)	⋅	Helena Bote	21	F	1.77	63	⋅	2012	18	⋅	⋅	⋅	⋅	⋅
(Angola)	⋅	Helena Francisco	22	PG	1.81	65	⋅	⋅	⋅	12	12	⋅	⋅	⋅
(Angola)	9	Helena Viegas	21	PG	1.73	⋅	⋅	⋅	⋅	⋅	⋅	9	2017	⋅
(Angola)	⋅	Indira José	30	PG	1.72	⋅	⋅	⋅	⋅	9	9	⋅	⋅	⋅
(Angola)	8	Isabel Francisco	36	PG	1.68	65	⋅	2012	8	8	8	8	2017	⋅
(Angola)	⋅	Janeth Zas		⋅	⋅	⋅	⋅	2012	⋅	⋅	⋅	⋅	⋅	⋅
(Angola)	17	Joana Bende	20	SG	1.78	⋅	⋅	⋅	⋅	⋅	16	17	2017	⋅
(Angola)	15	Juda Quindanda	18	PG	1.75	⋅	⋅	⋅	⋅	⋅	⋅	⋅	2017	⋅
(United States)	⋅	Latia Williams	24	F	1.78	⋅	⋅	⋅	⋅	18	⋅	⋅	⋅	⋅
(Mozambique)	⋅	Leia Dongue	25	PF	1.85	85	⋅	⋅	–	6	6	6	6	→
(Angola)	⋅	Letícia André	27	SF	1.76	65	⋅	⋅	5	5	5	5	⋅	⋅
(United States)	⋅	Lindsay Taylor	34	C	2.03	90	⋅	⋅	⋅	⋅	19	⋅	⋅	⋅
(Angola)	11	Luísa Tomás	33	C	1.92	82	⋅	⋅	–	11	11	11	2017	⋅
(Angola)	⋅	Madalena Felix	24	PG	1.79	75	⋅	2012	9	⋅	⋅	⋅	⋅	⋅
(Senegal)	⋅	Maimouna Diarra	24	C	1.98	⋅	⋅	⋅	⋅	⋅	18	⋅	⋅	⋅
(Angola)	⋅	Marinela Muxiri	31	F	1.86	⋅	⋅	⋅	⋅	⋅	15	15	⋅	⋅
(Democratic Republic of the Congo)	⋅	Mireille Tshiyoyo	24	C	1.88	⋅	⋅	2012	⋅	⋅	⋅	⋅	⋅	⋅
(Angola)	⋅	Nacissela Maurício	36	F	1.86	80	⋅	2012	13	13	13	13	⋅	⋅
(Democratic Republic of the Congo)	⋅	Nelly Bopoli	33	⋅	⋅	⋅	⋅	2012	⋅	⋅	⋅	⋅	⋅	⋅
(Angola)	7	Rosa Gala	21	SG	1.75	62	⋅	⋅	–	7	7	7	2017	⋅
(Nigeria)	⋅	Sarah Ogoke	25	SG	1.77	⋅	⋅	⋅	⋅	⋅	15	⋅	⋅	⋅
(Angola)	⋅	Sónia Ndoniema	31	SF	1.88	77	⋅	⋅	–	10	10	10	10	⋅
(Jamaica)	–	Vanessa Gidden	33	⋅	1.91	⋅	⋅	⋅	⋅	⋅	⋅	⋅	⋅	2018

== 2001–2010 ==
C.D. Primeiro de Agosto basketball players 2001–2010
L = Angola league winner; C = African champions cup winner

Nat	Name	A	P	H	Apolinário Paquete				A.M.	H.G.	R. Duarte		H.G.	A.M.
Nat	Name	A	P	H	2001	2002	2003	2004	2005	2006	2007	2008	2009	2010
Nat	Name	A	P	H	L	L	L	L	L	C	L	L		
(Angola)	Angela Cardoso	–	⋅		⋅	⋅	⋅	⋅	⋅	⋅	⋅	2008	⋅	⋅
(Angola)	Astrida Vicente	32	F		2001	⋅	⋅	2004	⋅	⋅	⋅	2008	2009	2010
(Angola)	Barbara Guimarães	28	⋅		2001	⋅	⋅	2004	⋅	⋅	⋅	2008	⋅	⋅
(Angola)	Biju	–	⋅		2001	⋅	⋅	⋅	⋅	⋅	⋅	⋅	⋅	⋅
(Democratic Republic of the Congo)	Bokomba Masela	–	⋅		⋅	⋅	⋅	⋅	⋅	⋅	⋅	2008	⋅	2010
(Angola)	Cláudia António	–	⋅		⋅	⋅	⋅	⋅	⋅	⋅	⋅	⋅	⋅	2010
(Angola)	Cláudia Dundão	–	⋅		⋅	⋅	⋅	⋅	⋅	⋅	⋅	⋅	⋅	2010
(Cape Verde)	Crispina Correia	33	C	1.91	⋅	⋅	⋅	⋅	⋅	⋅	⋅	2008	⋅	⋅
(Angola)	Domitila Ventura	–	⋅		2001	⋅	⋅	⋅	⋅	⋅	⋅	2008	2009	⋅
(Angola)	Ernestina Neto	–	F	1.78	2001	⋅	⋅	2004	⋅	⋅	⋅	2008	2009	2010
(Angola)	Fineza Eusébio	–	PG	1.68	⋅	⋅	⋅	⋅	⋅	⋅	⋅	2008	⋅	2010
(Angola)	Irene Guerreiro	34	F	1.72	2001	⋅	⋅	2004	⋅	⋅	⋅	⋅	⋅	⋅
(Angola)	Isabel Francisco	–	PG	1.68	2001	⋅	⋅	⋅	⋅	⋅	⋅	2008	2009	2010
(Angola)	Janeth Zas	–	⋅		⋅	⋅	⋅	⋅	⋅	⋅	⋅	⋅	⋅	2010
(Angola)	Jaqueline Francisco	31	C		2001	⋅	⋅	2004	⋅	⋅	⋅	2008	2009	⋅
(Angola)	Laura Agostinho		G		2001	⋅	⋅	2004	⋅	⋅	⋅	⋅	⋅	⋅
(Angola)	Luísa Miguel		F		⋅	⋅	⋅	2004	⋅	⋅	⋅	⋅	⋅	⋅
(Angola)	Luísa Tomás	–	C	1.92	⋅	⋅	⋅	⋅	⋅	⋅	⋅	⋅	2009	2010
(Angola)	Madalena Felix	–	PG	1.79	⋅	⋅	⋅	⋅	⋅	⋅	⋅	⋅	⋅	2010
(Angola)	Manuela Oliveira	–	⋅		2001	⋅	⋅	⋅	⋅	⋅	⋅	⋅	⋅	⋅
(Angola)	Maria Afonso Manú	40	⋅		⋅	⋅	⋅	⋅	⋅	⋅	⋅	2008	⋅	⋅
(Angola)	Mpinda Yolanda	–	⋅		⋅	⋅	⋅	⋅	⋅	⋅	⋅	⋅	⋅	2010
(Angola)	Nacissela Maurício	–	F	1.86	⋅	⋅	⋅	⋅	⋅	⋅	⋅	2008	2009	2010
(Democratic Republic of the Congo)	Nelly Bopoli	–	⋅		⋅	⋅	⋅	⋅	⋅	⋅	⋅	⋅	⋅	2010
(Democratic Republic of the Congo)	Pauline Nsimbo	22	C	1.88	⋅	⋅	⋅	2004	⋅	⋅	⋅	⋅	⋅	⋅
(Angola)	Sofia Capinga	28	⋅		2001	⋅	⋅	⋅	⋅	⋅	⋅	⋅	2009	2010
(Angola)	Sonia Guadalupe	–	⋅		⋅	⋅	⋅	⋅	⋅	⋅	⋅	2008	2009	⋅
(Angola)	Tucayana Manuel	–	⋅		2001	⋅	⋅	⋅	⋅	⋅	⋅	⋅	⋅	⋅

== B Team players ==
C.D. Primeiro de Agosto women basketball B-Team players 2004
Nat	Name	A	P	H	?				
Nat	Name	A	P	H	04				
Nat	Name	A	P	H	04	(Angola)	Eliza Marcela	⋅	2004
(Angola)	Luísa Tomás	21	C	1.92	2004				
(Angola)	Nádia Guimarães		G		2004				
(Angola)	Rosa António		⋅		2004				
(Angola)	Sónia Guadalupe	19	F	1.88	2004				

== See also ==
- Category:C.D. Primeiro de Agosto women's basketball players
- List of C.D. Primeiro de Agosto men's basketball players
- List of Angola women's national basketball team players
