= 2012 FIBA Africa Women's Clubs Champions Cup =

2012 FIBA Africa Champions Cup for Women
18th FIBA Africa Champions Cup for Women

Tournament details
- Host country: Ivory Coast
- Dates: October 19 – 28
- Teams: 10 (from 53 federations)
- Venue: 1 (in 1 host city)

Final positions
- Champions: Mozambique (L.Muçulmana's 1st title; Mozambique's 5th title)

Tournament statistics
- MVP: (Mozambique) Clarisse Machanguana
- Top scorer: (Ivory Coast) Kouyaté 19.4
- Top rebounds: (Nigeria) Mohammed 9.85

Official website
- 2012 FIBA Africa Women's Clubs Champions Cup

The 2012 FIBA Africa Women's Clubs Champions Cup (18th edition), was an international basketball tournament held in Abidjan, Ivory Coast, from October 19 to 28, 2012. The tournament, organized by FIBA Africa and hosted by Club Sportif d'Abidjan, was contested by 10 clubs split into 2 groups, the first four of which qualifying for the knock-out stage.

The tournament was won by Liga Muçulmana from Mozambique.

== Draw ==
Group A	Group B
(Ivory Coast) Club Sportif d'Abidjan (Nigeria) First Bank (Mozambique) Liga Muçulmana (Gabon) Ndella (Angola) Primeiro de Agosto	(Ivory Coast) Abidjan Basket Club (Kenya) Eagle Wings (Nigeria) First Deepwater (Angola) Interclube (Tunisia) Sfaxien

== Preliminary rounds ==
Times given below are in UTC.

=== Group A ===
Qualified for the quarter-finals

	Group A	M	W	L	PF	PA	Diff	P
1.	(Mozambique) Liga Muçulmana	4	3	1	330	204	+126	7
2.	(Angola) Primeiro de Agosto	4	3	1	250	183	+67	7
3.	(Nigeria) First Bank	4	2	2	229	242	-13	6
4.	(Ivory Coast) Club Sportif d'Abidjan	4	2	2	263	257	+6	6
5.	(Gabon) Ndella	4	0	4	125	321	-196	4

19 October 2012
14:00

L.Muçulmana (Mozambique)	87–42	(Nigeria) First Bank

19 October 2012
18:00

Boxscore

Ndella (Gabon)	34–58	(Ivory Coast) CS Abidjan
Scoring by quarter: 5-21, 5-15, 8-10, 16-12
Pts: Tsoungui 8 Rebs: Aboghe 6 Asts: Moussonda 3		Pts: Sène 12; Rebs: Fofana 12; Asts: A.Kolga 4

20 October 2012
14:00

Boxscore

Ndella (Gabon)	24–64	(Nigeria) First Bank
Scoring by quarter: 4-9, 7-15, 11-20, 2-20
Pts: Tsoungui 10; Rebs: Obone 6 Asts: Tsoungui, Moussonda 1		Pts: Mohammed 19; Rebs: Mohammed 17; Asts: Whyte 2

20 October 2012
20:00

Boxscore

1º de Agosto (Angola)	50–54	(Mozambique) L.Muçulmana
Scoring by quarter: 14-12, 9-5, 13-21, 14-16
Pts: Nacissela 14; Rebs: Letícia 7 Asts: Nacissela, Letícia 4		Pts: Machanguana 18; Rebs: Tanucha 10; Asts: Rute, Anabela 3

21 October 2012
12:00

Boxscore

Ndella (Gabon)	35–84	(Angola) 1º de Agosto
Scoring by quarter: 9-22, 10-15, 9-24, 7-23
Pts: Leyama 12; Rebs: Aboghe 8 Asts: four players 4		Pts: Gimo 15; Rebs: Ernestina 6 Asts: three players 3

21 October 2012
18:00

Boxscore

First Bank (Nigeria)	78–76	(Ivory Coast) CS Abidjan
Scoring by quarter: 15-24, 19-17, 19-25, 25-10
Pts: Ojela 17; Rebs: Mohammed 15; Asts: Amos 5		Pts: Sène 28; Rebs: Daou 20; Asts: Kouyaté 6

23 October 2012
14:00

Boxscore

First Bank (Nigeria)	45–55	(Angola) 1º de Agosto
Scoring by quarter: 15-6, 9-13, 8-22, 13-14
Pts: Mohammed 9 Rebs: Mohammed 15; Asts: three players 1		Pts: Felizarda 19; Rebs: Nacissela 9 Asts: Letícia 3

23 October 2012
18:00

Boxscore

CS Abidjan (Ivory Coast)	80–74	(Mozambique) L.Muçulmana
Scoring by quarter: 21-22, 26-14, 20-17, 13-21
Pts: Sène 24; Rebs: Daou 8 Asts: Sène, Kouyaté 9		Pts: Traore, Machanguana 17; Rebs: Tanucha 9 Asts: Traore 5

24 October 2012
14:00

Boxscore

L.Muçulmana (Mozambique)	115–32	(Gabon) Ndella
Scoring by quarter: 42-6, 20-9, 23-7, 30-10
Pts: Filomena 17; Rebs: Odélia 8 Asts: Valerdina 7		Pts: Moussonda 9 Rebs: Obone, Leyama 4 Asts: three players 1

24 October 2012
18:00

Boxscore

CS Abidjan (Ivory Coast)	49–61	(Angola) 1º de Agosto
Scoring by quarter: 13-16, 15-16, 7-13, 14-16
Pts: Kouyaté 18; Rebs: Daou 15; Asts: Kouyaté 12		Pts: Gimo 13; Rebs: Tshiyoyo 10; Asts: I.Francisco 6

=== Group B ===
Qualified for the quarter-finals

	Group B	M	W	L	PF	PA	Diff	P
1.	(Angola) Interclube	4	4	0	249	199	+50	8
2.	(Ivory Coast) Abidjan Basket Club	4	3	1	240	178	+62	7
3.	(Nigeria) First Deepwater	4	2	2	213	166	+47	6
4.	(Tunisia) Sfaxien	4	1	3	220	225	-5	5
5.	(Kenya) Eagle Wings	4	0	4	186	271	-85	4

19 October 2012
12:00

Sfaxien (Tunisia)	64–47	(Kenya) Eagle Wings
Scoring by quarter: n/a, n/a
Pts: n/a Rebs: n/a		Pts: n/a Rebs: n/a

19 October 2012
20:00

Abidjan BC (Ivory Coast)	51–52	(Angola) Interclube
Scoring by quarter: n/a, n/a
Pts: n/a Rebs: n/a		Pts: n/a Rebs: n/a

20 October 2012
16:00

Boxscore

Sfaxien (Tunisia)	55–57	(Nigeria) F. Deepwater
Scoring by quarter: 21-11, 9-12, 8-21, 17-13
Pts: Tireira 29; Rebs: Tireira 8 Asts: Tireira, Zagrouba 3		Pts: Atosu 25; Rebs: Chukwuma, Ahmed 6 Asts: Ukato 3

20 October 2012
20:00

Boxscore

Interclube (Angola)	62–48	(Kenya) Eagle Wings
Scoring by quarter: 16-9, 16-13, 22-7, 8-19
Pts: Astrida 15; Rebs: Nadir, Ngiendula 9 Asts: Henderson 6		Pts: Mjomba 11; Rebs: Shani 9 Asts: Mjomba 6

21 October 2012
10:00

Boxscore

Eagle Wings (Kenya)	45–79	(Nigeria) F. Deepwater
Scoring by quarter: 10-19, 16-22, 9-18, 10-20
Pts: Shani 16; Rebs: Shani, A.Okoth 8 Asts: Mjomba 3		Pts: Atosu 24; Rebs: Aderinto 5 Asts: Atosu, Emmanuel 4

21 October 2012
10:00

Boxscore

Abidjan BC (Ivory Coast)	53–40	(Tunisia) Sfaxien
Scoring by quarter: 6-15, 10-8, 22-7, 15-10
Pts: Ebonji 14; Rebs: Ebonji, Berte 8 Asts: Ebonji, Berte 6		Pts: Tireira 12; Rebs: Tireira 9 Asts: Zagrouba 4

23 October 2012
12:00

Boxscore

Eagle Wings (Kenya)	46–66	(Ivory Coast) Abidjan BC
Scoring by quarter: 12-19, 7-9, 10-19, 17-19
Pts: Nanzala 12; Rebs: Shani 9 Asts: Mjomba 4		Pts: Ebonji 18; Rebs: Berte, Diabate 5 Asts: Diomande 9

23 October 2012
20:00

Boxscore

Interclube (Angola)	66–38	(Nigeria) F. Deepwater
Scoring by quarter: 23-10, 10-11, 23-12, 10-5
Pts: Astrida 25; Rebs: Ngiendula 12; Asts: Ngiendula 3		Pts: Atosu, Akashili 10; Rebs: Chukwuma 6 Asts: Obasi 4

24 October 2012
16:00

Boxscore

Interclube (Angola)	68–61	(Tunisia) Sfaxien
Scoring by quarter: 19-17, 12-17, 20-11, 17-16
Pts: Nadir 14; Rebs: Nadir 11; Asts: Henderson 6		Pts: Tireira 18; Rebs: Tireira 4 Asts: Tireira 4

24 October 2012
20:00

Boxscore

F. Deepwater (Nigeria)	39–69	(Ivory Coast) Abidjan BC
Scoring by quarter: 13-15, 14-19, 5-22, 7-13
Pts: Akashili 10; Rebs: Akashili 4 Asts: Ukato 3		Pts: Tshiniangu 18; Rebs: Tshiniangu 18; Asts: Diomande 9

== Knockout stage ==
Quarter-finals
Friday, 26 October
(Tunisia) Sfaxien	53
(Mozambique) L.Muçulmana	72
Friday, 26 October
(Nigeria) First Bank	57
(Ivory Coast) Abidjan BC	59
Friday, 26 October
(Ivory Coast) CS Abidjan	41
(Angola) Interclube	65
Friday, 26 October
(Nigeria) F. Deepwater	51
(Angola) 1º de Agosto	58

5th-8th Place
Saturday, 27 October
(Tunisia) Sfaxien	51
(Nigeria) First Bank	49
Saturday, 27 October
(Ivory Coast) CS Abidjan	61
(Nigeria) F. Deepwater	55

5th place
Sunday, 28 October
(Tunisia) Sfaxien	64
(Ivory Coast) CS Abidjan	75
7th place
Sunday, 28 October
(Nigeria) First Bank	62
(Nigeria) F. Deepwater	63

Quarter-finals
Friday, 26 October
(Tunisia) Sfaxien	53
(Mozambique) L.Muçulmana	72
Friday, 26 October
(Nigeria) First Bank	57
(Ivory Coast) Abidjan BC	59
Friday, 26 October
(Ivory Coast) CS Abidjan	41
(Angola) Interclube	65
Friday, 26 October
(Nigeria) F. Deepwater	51
(Angola) 1º de Agosto	58

Semi-finals
Saturday, 27 October
(Mozambique) L.Muçulmana	69
(Ivory Coast) Abidjan BC	46
Saturday, 27 October
(Angola) Interclube	64
(Angola) 1º de Agosto	50

Final
Sunday, 28 October
(Mozambique) L.Muçulmana	53
(Angola) Interclube	43
Third place
Sunday, 28 October
(Ivory Coast) Abidjan BC	51
(Angola) 1º de Agosto	49

=== Quarter finals ===
26 October 2012
14:00

Boxscore

Sfaxien (Tunisia)	53–72	(Mozambique) L.Muçulmana
Scoring by quarter: 20-20, 15-11, 12-19, 6-22
Pts: Zagrouba, Tireira 11; Rebs: Tireira 6 Asts: Tireira 6		Pts: Machanguana 17; Rebs: Tanucha 8 Asts: Traore, Ngulela 3

26 October 2012
16:00

Boxscore

First Bank (Nigeria)	57–59	(Ivory Coast) Abidjan BC
Scoring by quarter: 17-22, 13-14, 14-19, 13-4
Pts: Nzekwe 16; Rebs: Mohammed 12; Asts: Adibeli, Ojela 3		Pts: Diabate 17; Rebs: Tshiniangu 6 Asts: Berte 5

26 October 2012
18:00

Boxscore

CS Abidjan (Ivory Coast)	41–65	(Angola) Interclube
Scoring by quarter: 15-20, 12-19, 5-16, 9-10
Pts: Kouyaté, Sène 10; Rebs: A.Kone 6 Asts: Kouyaté, Bognigni 3		Pts: Henderson 14; Rebs: Nadir 8 Asts: Catarina 5

26 October 2012
20:00

Boxscore

F. Deepwater (Nigeria)	51–58	(Angola) 1º de Agosto
Scoring by quarter: 8-16, 17-17, 14-13, 12-12
Pts: Ukato 13; Rebs: Akashili 6 Asts: Akashili 3		Pts: Nacissela 22; Rebs: Nacissela 9 Asts: Domitila 3

=== 9th place ===
26 October 2012
12:00

Boxscore

Ndella (Gabon)	51–59	(Kenya) Eagle Wings
Scoring by quarter: 4-17, 12-16, 21-12, 14-14
Pts: Obone 17; Rebs: Moussonda 9 Asts: Leyama 1		Pts: Mjomba 24; Rebs: A.Okoth, Nanzala 7 Asts: Mjomba 3

=== 5th-8th place ===
27 October 2012
14:00

Boxscore

Sfaxien (Tunisia)	51–49	(Nigeria) First Bank
Scoring by quarter: 13-10, 21-11, 11-9, 6-19
Pts: Tireira 13; Rebs: Adsi 12; Asts: Khalifa 4		Pts: Ojela 18; Rebs: Mohammed 8 Asts: Ojela 2

27 October 2012
16:00

Boxscore

CS Abidjan (Ivory Coast)	61–55	(Nigeria) F. Deepwater
Scoring by quarter: 10-10, 14-14, 17-12, 20-19
Pts: Kouyaté 33; Rebs: Kouyaté 7 Asts: M.Kolga, Sène 2		Pts: Akashili 23; Rebs: Obasi 7 Asts: Ukato 3

=== Semifinals ===
27 October 2012
18:00

Boxscore

L.Muçulmana (Mozambique)	69–46	(Ivory Coast) Abidjan BC
Scoring by quarter: 15-12, 16-10, 23-10, 15-15
Pts: Traore, Anabela 15; Rebs: Tanucha 11; Asts: Ngulela 8		Pts: Tshiniangu 12; Rebs: Tshiniangu 7 Asts: Berte 2

27 October 2012
20:00

Boxscore

Interclube (Angola)	64–50	(Angola) 1º de Agosto
Scoring by quarter: 14-12, 13-13, 19-8, 18-17
Pts: Astrida 12; Rebs: Luísa 9 Asts: Catarina 5		Pts: Nacissela 19; Rebs: Nacissela 8 Asts: I.Francisco 2

=== 7th place ===
28 October 2012
11:30

Boxscore

First Bank (Nigeria)	62–63	(Nigeria) F. Deepwater
Scoring by quarter: 23-21, 12-7, 15-15, 12-20
Pts: Ojela 21; Rebs: Mohammed 17; Asts: Barkley 2		Pts: Akashili 15; Rebs: Chukwuma, Ukato 6 Asts: Dabor 3

=== 5th place ===
28 October 2012
13:30

Boxscore

Sfaxien (Tunisia)	64–75	(Ivory Coast) CS Abidjan
Scoring by quarter: 13-13, 14-14, 10-26, 27-22
Pts: Tireira, M'Nasria 17; Rebs: M'Nasria 9 Asts: Tireira, Kraiem 2		Pts: Kouyaté 25; Rebs: Daou 10; Asts: Kouyaté, Sène 3

=== Bronze medal game ===
28 October 2012
15:30

Boxscore

Abidjan BC (Ivory Coast)	51–49	(Angola) 1º de Agosto
Scoring by quarter: 13-16, 13-7, 10-13, 15-13
Pts: Berte 21; Rebs: Diabate 8 Asts: Diomande 5		Pts: Nacissela 12; Rebs: Gimo 10; Asts: I.Francisco 4

=== Gold medal game ===
28 October 2012
18:00

Boxscore

L.Muçulmana (Mozambique)	53–43	(Angola) Interclube
Scoring by quarter: 18-9, 11-10, 13-18, 11-6
Pts: Traore 22; Rebs: Ingvild 8 Asts: Ngulela 3		Pts: Astrida 15; Rebs: Ngiendula 7 Asts: Ngiendula, Henderson 2

== Final standings ==
Rank	Team	Record
Gold medal	(Mozambique) Liga Muçulmana	6–1
Silver medal	(Angola) Interclube	6–1
Bronze medal	(Ivory Coast) Abidjan Basket Club	5–2
4.	(Angola) Primeiro de Agosto	4–3
5.	(Ivory Coast) Club Sportif d'Abidjan	4–3
6.	(Tunisia) Sfaxien	2–5
7.	(Nigeria) First Deepwater	3–4
8.	(Nigeria) First Bank	2–5
9.	(Kenya) Eagle Wings	1–4
10.	(Gabon) Ndella	0–5

Liga Muçulmana roster
Anabela Cossa, Aya Traore, Cátia Halar, Clarisse Machanguana, Deolinda Ngulela, Filomena Micato, Ingvild Mucauro, Jazz Covington, Leia Dongue, Odélia Mafanela, Rute Muianga, Valerdina Manhonga, Coach: Nazir Salé

== All Tournament Team ==
G	(Mozambique)	Deolinda Ngulela
G	(Angola)	Astrida Vicente
SF	(Angola)	Nacissela Maurício
PF	(Mozambique)	Leia Dongue
C	(Mozambique)	Clarisse Machanguana

2012 FIBA Africa Women's Clubs Champions Cup

Liga Muçulmana de Maputo
1st Title

Most Valuable Player
(Mozambique) Clarisse Machanguana

== See also ==
- 2013 FIBA Africa Championship for Women
