= List of Angola women's national basketball team players =

This article aims at showing the evolution of the Angola women's national basketball team throughout the 1980s, 1990s and 2000s in such competitions as the FIBA Africa Championship, the Olympic Games and the FIBA World Championship.

== 2011–2017 ==
Angola women's basketball players 2011–2017
A = African championship; A = African championship winner; W = World cup

#	Name	A	P	H	C	Aníbal Moreira				J. Covilhã	
#	Name	A	P	H	C	2011	2012	2013	2014	2015	2017
#	Name	A	P	H	C	A	O	A	W	A	A
14	Ana Gonçalves	24	PF	1.82	(Angola) PRI	⋅	5	⋅	8	12	2017
⋅	Angela Cardoso	32	SF	1.80	(Angola) PRI	7	7	⋅	⋅	⋅	⋅
⋅	Angelina Golome	26	C	1.90	(Angola) INT	⋅	⋅	⋅	12	⋅	⋅
5	Artemis Afonso	24	G	1.79	(Portugal) QDL	⋅	⋅	⋅	9	5	2017
⋅	Astrida Vicente	34	SG	1.73	(Angola) INT	12	12	9	⋅	⋅	⋅
⋅	Catarina Camufal	33	PG	1.68	(Angola) INT	4	4	4	⋅	⋅	⋅
3	Clarisse Mpaka	33	SF	1.76	(France) LAG	⋅	⋅	5	⋅	⋅	2017
20	Cristina Matiquite	25	C	1.91	(Angola) PRI	9	⋅	⋅	⋅	⋅	2017
⋅	Elsa Eduardo	25	G	1.70	(Angola) INT	⋅	⋅	⋅	5	⋅	⋅
6	Felizarda Jorge	32	SG	1.79	(Angola) INT	6	6	6	⋅	6	2017
4	Fineza Eusébio	27	PG	1.68	(Angola) PRI	8	8	8	4	4	2017
⋅	Helena Viegas	19	F	1.73	(Angola) LUS	⋅	⋅	⋅	7	⋅	⋅
⋅	Isabel Francisco	35	PG	1.70	(Angola) PRI	⋅	⋅	⋅	⋅	8	⋅
1	Italee Lucas	28	PG	1.70	(Angola) INT	⋅	⋅	⋅	⋅	⋅	2017
11	Luisa Tomás	34	C	1.92	(Angola) PRI	11	11	11	11	11	2017
⋅	Luzia Simão	16	F	1.83	(Angola) INT	5	⋅	⋅	⋅	⋅	⋅
⋅	Madalena Felix	24	F	1.78	(Angola) PRI	⋅	9	9	⋅	⋅	⋅
⋅	Marinela Muxiri	30	F	1.86	(Portugal) QDL	⋅	⋅	⋅	⋅	9	⋅
⋅	Nacissela Maurício	35	SF	1.86	(Angola) PRI	13	13	13	13	13	⋅
⋅	Nadir Manuel	28	PF	1.88	(Angola) INT	14	14	14	14	14	⋅
15	Ngiendula Filipe	35	PF	1.80	(Angola) INT	15	15	15	15	15	2017
2	Rosa Gala	25	SG	1.73	(Angola) PRI	⋅	⋅	⋅	6	7	2017
10	Sónia Guadalupe	31	F	1.88	(Angola) PRI	10	10	10	10	⋅	2017
7	Whitney Miguel	25	PF	1.85	(France) RBF	⋅	⋅	5	⋅	⋅	2017

== 2003–2009 ==
Angola women's basketball players 2001–2010
AC = African championship; WC = World cup

Name	A	P	H	C	A.P.	Aníbal Moreira		
Name	A	P	H	C	2003	2005	2007	2009
Name	A	P	H	C	A	A	A	A
Angela Cardoso	–	SF	1.80	–	⋅	7	7	⋅
Astrida Vicente	–	F	1.73	–	2003	12	12	12
Bárbara Guimarães Bijú	25	G		PRI	2003	9	⋅	⋅
Catarina Camufal	–	PG	1.68	–	⋅	4	8	4
Domitila Ventura	30	PG	1.63	–	2003	6	6	6
Ernestina Neto	29	PF	1.85	PRI	2003	14	14	14
Esperança André	–	C		INT	2003	⋅	⋅	⋅
Fátima Quinzele	28			–	⋅	13	⋅	⋅
Felizarda Jorge	–	SG	1.79	–	⋅	⋅	⋅	7
Indira José	22	C	1.93	INT	⋅	⋅	11	⋅
Irene Guerreiro	39	PF	1.72	INT	2003	10	10	10
Isabel Francisco	–	PG	1.70	–	2003	8	⋅	8
Jaqueline Francisco	29	C	1.83	–	2003	⋅	5	⋅
Laura Agostinho	–	G		PRI	2003	⋅	⋅	⋅
Luísa Miguel	30			PRI	⋅	5	⋅	⋅
Luisa Tomás	–	C	1.92	–	⋅	11	⋅	11
Maria Afonso	39	PG	1.68	PRI	⋅	⋅	4	⋅
Maria André	–	F		PRI	2003	⋅	⋅	⋅
Maria Cardoso	–	C		INT	2003	⋅	⋅	⋅
Nacissela Maurício	–	SF	1.86	–	⋅	⋅	15	13
Nadir Manuel	–	PF	1.88	–	⋅	⋅	⋅	15
Ngiendula Filipe	–	SF	1.80	–	2003	15	13	5
Sónia Guadalupe	–	F	1.88	–	⋅	⋅	9	9

== 1990–1997 ==
Angola women's basketball players 1990–1997
AC = African championship; OQ = Olympic qualifier

Name	A	P	H	C	–			
Name	A	P	H	C	1990	1993	1994	1997
Name	A	P	H	C	AC	AC	AC	AC
	–			–	⋅	⋅	⋅	⋅

== 1981–1988 ==
Angola women's basketball players 1981–1988
A = African championship; O = Olympic qualifier

Name	A	P	H	C	–				
Name	A	P	H	C	1981	1983	1984	1986	1988
Name	A	P	H	C	A	A	A	A	O
Antónia Cruz	–			–	⋅	⋅	⋅	⋅	7
Elisa Francisco	22			–	⋅	⋅	⋅	⋅	6
Etelvina Santana	22			–	⋅	⋅	⋅	⋅	12
Fátima Cambende	17			–	⋅	⋅	⋅	⋅	9
Georgina Abraão	19			–	⋅	⋅	⋅	⋅	8
Licínia Velho	16			–	⋅	⋅	⋅	⋅	11
Ludovina Ténis	23			–	⋅	⋅	⋅	⋅	15
Maria Barbosa	20			–	⋅	⋅	⋅	⋅	4
Rosa Francisco	19			–	⋅	⋅	⋅	⋅	5
Telma Gourgel	18			–	⋅	⋅	⋅	⋅	14
Tumba Mayassi	25			–	⋅	⋅	⋅	⋅	13
Vanda Fernandes	19			–	⋅	⋅	⋅	⋅	13

== See also ==
- List of Angola women's national handball team players
- Angola national basketball team U18
- Angola national basketball team U16
- Angola Women's Basketball League
- Federação Angolana de Basquetebol
- List of Angola international footballers
