= 2014 FIBA Africa Women's Clubs Champions Cup =

2014 FIBA Africa Champions Cup for Women
20th FIBA Africa Champions Cup for Women

Tournament details
- Host country: Tunisia
- Dates: November 28 – December 7
- Teams: 9 (from 53 federations)
- Venue: 1 (in 1 host city)

Final positions
- Champions: Angola (Interclube's 4th title; Angola's 5th title)

Tournament statistics
- MVP: (Mozambique) Leia Dongue
- Top scorer: (Mozambique) Dongue 21.7
- Top rebounds: (Democratic Republic of the Congo) Nyota 11.5
- Top assists: (United States) Lucas 4
- PPG (Team): (Angola) Interclube 76
- RPG (Team): (Nigeria) Dolphins 47.9
- APG (Team): (Angola) Interclube 12.7

Official website
- 2014 FIBA Africa Women's Clubs Champions Cup

The 2014 FIBA Africa Women's Clubs Champions Cup (20th edition), was an international basketball tournament that took place at the Salle Olympique Raed Bejaoui, in Sfax, Tunisia, from November 28 to December 7, 2014. The tournament, organized by FIBA Africa and hosted by Club Sportif Sfaxien, was contested by 9 teams split into 2 groups, the first four of each group qualifying for the knock-out stage (quarter, semis and final).

The tournament was won by Interclube from Angola.

== Draw ==
Group A	Group B
(Tunisia) Club Sportif Sfaxien; Kenya Ports Authority (Nigeria) First Bank (Angola) Primeiro de Agosto	(Tunisia) C.S.P.C. (Nigeria) Dolphins (Democratic Republic of the Congo) I.N.S.S. (Angola) Interclube (Kenya) USIU Flames

== Preliminary rounds ==
Times given below are in UTC+1.

Qualified for the quarter-finals

=== Group A ===
	Teams	M	W	L	PF	PA	Diff	P
1.	(Angola) Primeiro de Agosto	3	3	0	232	174	+58	6
2.	(Nigeria) First Bank	3	2	1	221	205	+16	5
3.	(Tunisia) Club Sportif Sfaxien	3	1	2	191	201	-10	4
4.	Kenya Ports Authority	3	0	3	177	221	-44	3

28 November 2014
17:00

Boxscore

CS Sfaxien (Tunisia)	75–58	(Kenya) K.P.A.
Scoring by quarter: 23-11, 19-8, 16-13, 17-26
Pts: Račić 22; Rebs: Denson, Akroute 6 Asts: Khlifa, Msadek 3		Pts: Obonyo 21; Rebs: Odhiambo, Mureji 9 Asts: Odhiambo 3

Salle Raed Bejaoui, Sfax
Referees: Chahinaz Bousseta (MAR), Banza Tonton (COD)

29 November 2014
16:00

Boxscore

1º de Agosto (Angola)	85–77	(Nigeria) First Bank
Scoring by quarter: 9-10, 31-24, 18-22, 27-21
Pts: Tanucha 23; Rebs: Luísa 7 Asts: Fineza 3		Pts: Ogoke 18; Rebs: Ogoke 5 Asts: Adjoussi 4

Salle Raed Bejaoui, Sfax
Referees: Hatem Langar (TUN), Zouzou Nadège (CIV)

30 November 2014
17:00

Boxscore

1º de Agosto (Angola)	66–50	(Tunisia) CS Sfaxien
Scoring by quarter: 20-11, 17-6, 16-14, 13-19
Pts: Williams 19; Rebs: Tanucha 13; Asts: Isabel 4		Pts: Adsi 13; Rebs: Adsi 9 Asts: Khlifa 2

Salle Raed Bejaoui, Sfax
Referees: Banza Tonton (COD), Zouzou Nadège (CIV)

1 December 2014
17:00

Boxscore

First Bank (Nigeria)	77–66	(Tunisia) CS Sfaxien
Scoring by quarter: 27-13, 12-18, 21-13, 17-22
Pts: Ekworomadu 23; Rebs: Ogoke 14; Asts: Ogoke 4		Pts: Denson 22; Rebs: Denson 9 Asts: Khlifa 4

Salle Raed Bejaoui, Sfax
Referees: Chahinaz Bousseta (MAR), Nadjet Zenagui (ALG)

2 December 2014
19:00

Boxscore

K.P.A. (Kenya)	47–79	(Angola) 1º de Agosto
Scoring by quarter: 14-20, 6-18, 9-27, 18-14
Pts: Odhiambo 13; Rebs: Mwangale, Odongo 5 Asts: Odhiambo 2		Pts: Tanucha 21; Rebs: Fineza 7 Asts: Isabel 4

Salle Raed Bejaoui, Sfax
Referees: Chahinaz Bousseta (MAR), Banza Tonton (COD), Zouzou Nadège (CIV)

3 December 2014
19:00

Boxscore

K.P.A. (Kenya)	52–67	(Nigeria) First Bank
Scoring by quarter: 17-13, 18-16, 5-12, 12-26
Pts: Odhiambo 19; Rebs: Odhiambo 11; Asts: Odhiambo 3		Pts: Ekworomadu 19; Rebs: Ogoke 9 Asts: Ogoke 6

Salle Raed Bejaoui, Sfax
Referees: Ben Ltaifa (TUN), Ndeye Diagne (SEN), Clésio Ramos (ANG)

Qualified for the quarter-finals

=== Group B ===
	Teams	M	W	L	PF	PA	Diff	P
1.	(Angola) Interclube	4	4	0	320	236	+84	8
2.	(Nigeria) Dolphins	4	3	1	307	272	+35	7
4.	(Democratic Republic of the Congo) I.N.S.S.	4	2	2	306	254	+52	6
3.	(Tunisia) C.S.P.C.	4	1	3	253	275	-22	5
5.	(Kenya) USIU Flames	4	0	4	232	381	-149	4

29 November 2014
14:00

Boxscore

Interclube (Angola)	67–55	(Democratic Republic of the Congo) I.N.S.S.
Scoring by quarter: 18-12, 13-11, 16-15, 20-17
Pts: Lucas 20; Rebs: Holmes 7 Asts: Holmes 4		Pts: Nyota 18; Rebs: Nyota, Ahongi 13; Asts: Tshiyoyo 3

Salle Raed Bejaoui, Sfax
Referees: Sammy Wakaba (KEN), Ben Ltaifa (TUN)

18:00

Boxscore

USIU Flames (Kenya)	59–78	(Tunisia) C.S.P.C.
Scoring by quarter: 18-15, 12-22, 10-9, 19-32
Pts: Chan 16; Rebs: Irankunda 8 Asts: four players 2		Pts: Hamrouni 32; Rebs: Hamrouni 11; Asts: Dhouibi 4

Salle Raed Bejaoui, Sfax
Referees: Banza Tonton (COD), Clésio Ramos (ANG)

30 November 2014
15:00

Boxscore

Dolphins (Nigeria)	78–76	(Democratic Republic of the Congo) I.N.S.S.
Scoring by quarter: 25-17, 20-19, 12-12, 21-28
Pts: Currency 22; Rebs: three players 6 Asts: Nwakamma 5		Pts: Ahongi 20; Rebs: Nyota 15; Asts: Teba 4

Salle Raed Bejaoui, Sfax
Referees: Ben Ltaifa (TUN), Ambrose Mbalu (KEN)

19:00

Boxscore

USIU Flames (Kenya)	66–101	(Angola) Interclube
Scoring by quarter: 18-32, 13-17, 24-24, 11-28
Pts: Luvandwa 23; Rebs: Chan 9 Asts: Irankunda 3		Pts: Nadir 14; Rebs: Felizarda 5 Asts: Lucas 7

Salle Raed Bejaoui, Sfax
Referees: Chahinaz Bousseta (MAR), Hatem Langar (TUN)

1 December 2014
15:00

Boxscore

C.S.P.C. (Tunisia)	56–73	(Angola) Interclube
Scoring by quarter: 12-18, 14-19, 9-15, 21-21
Pts: Hamrouni 18; Rebs: Tshiniangu 11; Asts: Dhouibi 3		Pts: Lucas 19; Rebs: Nadir 14; Asts: Lucas 5

Salle Raed Bejaoui, Sfax
Referees: Sammy Wakaba (KEN), Olayinka Famogbiyela (NGR)

19:00

Boxscore

Dolphins (Nigeria)	102–58	(Kenya) USIU Flames
Scoring by quarter: 24-5, 18-19, 29-14, 31-20
Pts: Nwakamma 22; Rebs: Currency 10; Asts: Nwakamma 4		Pts: Luvandwa 26; Rebs: Chan 18; Asts: Chan 1

Salle Raed Bejaoui, Sfax
Referees: Clésio Ramos (ANG), Sarty Nghixulfwa (NAM)

2 December 2014
15:00

Boxscore

I.N.S.S. (Democratic Republic of the Congo)	100–49	(Kenya) USIU Flames
Scoring by quarter: 27-13, 15-20, 30-12, 28-4
Pts: Nyota 31; Rebs: Nyota 14; Asts: Tshiyoyo 8		Pts: Luvandwa 14; Rebs: Irankunda 7 Asts: Luvandwa 5

Salle Raed Bejaoui, Sfax
Referees: Ben Ltaifa (TUN), Hatem Langar (TUN), Sarty Nghixulfwa (NAM)

17:00

Boxscore

C.S.P.C. (Tunisia)	59–68	(Nigeria) Dolphins
Scoring by quarter: 14-23, 14-13, 17-15, 14-17
Pts: Tshiniangu 16; Rebs: Tshiniangu, Hamrouni 9 Asts: Dhouibi 3		Pts: Okpe 15; Rebs: Bhadmus 16; Asts: Nwakamma, Atosu 2

Salle Raed Bejaoui, Sfax
Referees: Ndeye Diagne (SEN), Nadjet Zenagui (ALG), Ambrose Mbalu (KEN)

3 December 2014
13:00

Boxscore

Interclube (Angola)	79–59	(Nigeria) Dolphins
Scoring by quarter: 26-19, 15-10, 13-13, 25-17
Pts: Holmes 19; Rebs: Holmes 9 Asts: Lucas 5		Pts: Kodjo 26; Rebs: Bhadmus 12; Asts: Currency 4

Salle Raed Bejaoui, Sfax
Referees: Sammy Wakaba (KEN), Hatem Langar (TUN), Nadjet Zenagui (ALG)

15:00

Boxscore

I.N.S.S. (Democratic Republic of the Congo)	75–60	(Tunisia) C.S.P.C.
Scoring by quarter: 22-10, 20-21, 18-11, 15-18
Pts: Ahongi 28; Rebs: Ahongi 13; Asts: Teba, Mafuta 2		Pts: Hamrouni 15; Rebs: Hamrouni, Tshiniangu 8 Asts: El Abed, Saadi 2

Salle Raed Bejaoui, Sfax
Referees: Chahinaz Bousseta (MAR), Olayinka Famogbiyela (NGR), Sarty Nghixulfwa (NAM)

== Knockout stage ==
Quarter-finals
5 December 2014 - 17:00
(Tunisia) CS Sfaxien	66
(Nigeria) Dolphins	64
5 December 2014 - 13:00
(Kenya) K.P.A.	40
(Angola) Interclube	68
5 December 2014 19:00
(Democratic Republic of the Congo) I.N.S.S.	71
(Nigeria) First Bank	83
5 December 2014 - 15:00
(Tunisia) C.S.P.C.	72
(Angola) 1º de Agosto	80

5th-8th Place
6 December 2014 - 15:00
(Tunisia) C.S.P.C.	64
(Nigeria) Dolphins	67
6 December 2014 - 13:00
(Kenya) K.P.A.	46
(Democratic Republic of the Congo) I.N.S.S.	62

5th place
7 December 2014 - 12:30
(Nigeria) Dolphins	76
(Democratic Republic of the Congo) I.N.S.S.	67
7th place
7 December 2014 - 10:30
(Tunisia) C.S.P.C.	74
(Kenya) K.P.A.	56

Quarter-finals
5 December 2014 - 13:00
(Kenya) K.P.A.	40
(Angola) Interclube	68
5 December 2014 19:00
(Democratic Republic of the Congo) I.N.S.S.	71
(Nigeria) First Bank	83
5 December 2014 - 15:00
(Tunisia) C.S.P.C.	72
(Angola) 1º de Agosto	80
5 December 2014 - 17:00
(Tunisia) CS Sfaxien	66
(Nigeria) Dolphins	64

Semi-finals
6 December 2014 - 19:00
(Angola) Interclube	69
(Nigeria) First Bank	53
6 December 2014 - 17:00
(Angola) 1º de Agosto	60
(Tunisia) CS Sfaxien	55

Final
7 December 2014 - 17:00
(Angola) Interclube	75
(Angola) 1º de Agosto	74
Third place
7 December 2014 - 14:30
(Tunisia) CS Sfaxien	75
(Nigeria) First Bank	61

=== Quarter-finals ===
5 December 2014
13:00

Boxscore

K.P.A. (Kenya)	40–68	(Angola) Interclube
Scoring by quarter: 8-24, 7-15, 8-14, 17-15
Pts: three players 8 Rebs: Mwangale 6 Asts: Odhiambo 3		Pts: four players 10; Rebs: Angelina 8 Asts: Lucas, Holmes 4

Salle Raed Bejaoui, Sfax
Referees: Ben Ltaifa (TUN), Hatem Langar (TUN), Olayinka Famogbiyela (NGR)

15:00

Boxscore

C.S.P.C. (Tunisia)	72–80	(Angola) 1º de Agosto
Scoring by quarter: 16-27, 18-21, 17-18, 21-14
Pts: Tshiniangu 20; Rebs: Dhouibi 4 Asts: three players 2		Pts: Tanucha 25; Rebs: Tanucha 13; Asts: Sónia 3

Salle Raed Bejaoui, Sfax
Referees: Banza Tonton (COD), Zouzou Nadège (CIV), Ambrose Mbalu (KEN)

17:00

Boxscore

CS Sfaxien (Tunisia)	66–64	(Nigeria) Dolphins
Scoring by quarter: 15-9, 10-19, 22-15, 19-21
Pts: Denson 17; Rebs: Denson 14; Asts: Adsi, Khlifa 2		Pts: Kodjo 21; Rebs: Kodjo 11; Asts: Okpe 3

Salle Raed Bejaoui, Sfax
Referees: Ndeye Diagne (SEN), Nadjet Zenagui (ALG), Sarty Nghixulfwa (NAM)

19:00

Boxscore

I.N.S.S. (Democratic Republic of the Congo)	71–83	(Nigeria) First Bank
Scoring by quarter: 21-17, 15-21, 17-21, 18-24
Pts: Ahongi 25; Rebs: Ahongi 7 Asts: Ahongi 2		Pts: Madu 18; Rebs: Ogoke 7 Asts: Ogoke, Ekworomadu 3

Salle Raed Bejaoui, Sfax
Referees: Chahinaz Bousseta (MAR), Sammy Wakaba (KEN), Clésio Ramos (ANG)

=== 5th-8th place ===
6 December 2014
13:00

Boxscore

K.P.A. (Kenya)	46–62	(Democratic Republic of the Congo) I.N.S.S.
Scoring by quarter: 7-16, 21-9, 10-17, 8-20
Pts: Obonyo 18; Rebs: Obonyo 9 Asts: Oketch 3		Pts: Ahongi 22; Rebs: Nyota 12; Asts: Teba 6

Salle Raed Bejaoui, Sfax
Referees: Olayinka Famogbiyela (NGR), Hatem Langar (TUN), Clésio Ramos (ANG)

15:00

Boxscore

C.S.P.C. (Tunisia)	64–67	(Nigeria) Dolphins
Scoring by quarter: 17-16, 14-13, 15-24, 18-14
Pts: Tshiniangu 20; Rebs: Tshiniangu 11; Asts: Jrad 4		Pts: Atosu 17; Rebs: Kodjo 17; Asts: Atosu, Nwakamma 4

Salle Raed Bejaoui, Sfax
Referees: Sammy Wakaba (KEN), Banza Tonton (COD), Ambrose Mbalu (KEN)

=== Semifinals ===
6 December 2014
17:00

Boxscore

1º de Agosto (Angola)	60–55	(Tunisia) CS Sfaxien
Scoring by quarter: 18-10, 14-16, 17-15, 11-14
Pts: Tanucha 28; Rebs: Williams 12; Asts: A.Gonçalves 3		Pts: Khlifa 15; Rebs: Denson 13; Asts: Denson 3

Salle Raed Bejaoui, Sfax
Referees: Ndeye Diagne (SEN), Zouzou Nadège (CIV), Nadjet Zenagui (ALG)

19:00

Boxscore

Interclube (Angola)	69–53	(Nigeria) First Bank
Scoring by quarter: 16-18, 15-13, 19-12, 19-10
Pts: Holmes 20; Rebs: Nadir 14; Asts: Lucas 3		Pts: Udeaja 14; Rebs: Udeaja 9 Asts: Ogoke 3

Salle Raed Bejaoui, Sfax
Referees: Chahinaz Bousseta (MAR), Ben Ltaifa (TUN), Sarty Nghixulfwa (NAM)

=== 7th place ===
7 December 2014
13:00

Boxscore

C.S.P.C. (Tunisia)	74–56	(Kenya) K.P.A.
Scoring by quarter: 16-10, 16-13, 21-11, 21-22
Pts: Hamrouni 26; Rebs: Ksouri 9 Asts: El Abed 3		Pts: Odhiambo 20; Rebs: Murambi 5 Asts: Oketch 3

Salle Raed Bejaoui, Sfax
Referees: Olayinka Famogbiyela (NGR), Zouzou Nadège (CIV), Clésio Ramos (ANG)

=== 5th place ===
7 December 2014
15:00

Boxscore

Dolphins (Nigeria)	76–67	(Democratic Republic of the Congo) I.N.S.S.
Scoring by quarter: 17-13, 19-14, 20-22, 20-18
Pts: Olaosebikan 17; Rebs: Kodjo 14; Asts: Atosu 4		Pts: Ahongi 17; Rebs: Ahongi, Nyota 10; Asts: Ahongi 3

Salle Raed Bejaoui, Sfax
Referees: Ben Ltaifa (TUN), Hatem Langar (TUN), Ambrose Mbalu (KEN)

=== Bronze medal game ===
7 December 2014
17:00

Boxscore

CS Sfaxien (Tunisia)	75–61	(Nigeria) First Bank
Scoring by quarter: 23-17, 21-10, 11-14, 20-20
Pts: Račić 21; Rebs: Adsi 13; Asts: Račić, Denson 4		Pts: Udeaja 23; Rebs: Chinyere 12; Asts: Ogoke 2

Salle Raed Bejaoui, Sfax
Referees: Banza Tonton (COD), Nadjet Zenagui (ALG), Sarty Nghixulfwa (NAM)

=== Gold medal game ===
7 December 2014
19:00

Boxscore

1º de Agosto (Angola)	74–75	(Angola) Interclube
Scoring by quarter: 21-10, 12-19, 21-17, 20-29
Pts: Tanucha 26; Rebs: Tanucha, Williams 9 Asts: Williams 2		Pts: Lucas 29; Rebs: Lucas 10; Asts: Holmes 4

Salle Raed Bejaoui, Sfax
Referees: Chahinaz Bousseta (MAR), Zouzou Nadège (CIV), Ndeye Diagne (SEN)

== Final standings ==
Rank	Team	Record
Gold medal	(Angola) Interclube	7–0
Silver medal	(Angola) Primeiro de Agosto	5–1
Bronze medal	(Tunisia) Club Sportif Sfaxien	3–3
4.	(Nigeria) First Bank	3–3
5.	(Nigeria) Dolphins	5–2
6.	(Democratic Republic of the Congo) I.N.S.S.	3–4
7.	(Tunisia) C.S.P.C.	2–5
8.	Kenya Ports Authority	0–6
9.	(Kenya) USIU Flames	0–4

Interclube roster
Angelina Golome, Astrida Vicente, Elsa Eduardo, Luzia Simão, Felizarda Jorge, Italee Lucas, Luzia Simão, Merciana Fernandes, Nadir Manuel, Ngiendula Filipe, Rosemira Daniel, Sequoia Holmes Coach: Manuel Sousa

== Statistical leaders ==
=== Individual Tournament Highs ===
Points

Rank	Name	G	Pts	PPG
1	(Mozambique) Leia Dongue	6	130	21.7
2	(Democratic Republic of the Congo) Hortis Ahongi	7	146	20.9
3	(Kenya) Hilda Luvandwa	4	77	19.3
4	(Sudan) Zeinab Chan	4	66	16.5
5	(Democratic Republic of the Congo) Betty Tshiniangu	7	115	16.4
6	(Democratic Republic of the Congo) Mireille Nyota	6	98	16.3
7	(United States) Italee Lucas	7	111	15.9
8	(Tunisia) Houda Hamrouni	7	109	15.6
9	(Nigeria) Priscilla Udeaja	6	91	15.2
10	(United States) Sequoia Holmes	7	101	14.4

Rebounds

Rank	Name	G	Rbs	RPG
1	(Democratic Republic of the Congo) Mireille Nyota	6	69	11.5
2	(Democratic Republic of the Congo) Hortis Ahongi	7	69	9.9
2	(Togo) Akpene Kodjo	7	69	9.9
4	(Sudan) Zeinab Chan	4	39	9.8
5	(United States) Brittany Denson	6	57	9.5
6	(Angola) Leia Dongue	6	56	9.3
7	(Nigeria) Bintu Bhadmus	7	62	8.9
8	(Angola) Nadir Manuel	7	60	8.6
9	(Democratic Republic of the Congo) Betty Tshiniangu	7	55	7.9
10	(Nigeria) Sarah Ogoke	6	45	7.5

Assists

Rank	Name	G	Ast	APG
1	(United States) Italee Lucas	7	28	4
2	(United States) Sequoia Holmes	7	23	3.3
3	(Nigeria) Sarah Ogoke	6	20	3.3
4	(Democratic Republic of the Congo) Natacha Teba	7	20	2.9
4	(Nigeria) Ndidiamaka Nwakamma	7	20	2.9
6	(Democratic Republic of the Congo) Mireille Tshiyoyo	7	16	2.3
7	(Tunisia) Siwar Khlifa	6	14	2.3
8	(Kenya) Hilda Luvandwa	4	9	2.3
9	(Angola) Isabel Francisco	6	13	2.2
9	(Kenya) Yvonne Odhiambo	6	13	2.2

Steals

Rank	Name	G	Sts	SPG
1	(Democratic Republic of the Congo) Cecile Nyoka	7	21	3
2	(Kenya) Hilda Luvandwa	4	11	2.8
3	(United States) Sequoia Holmes	7	18	2.6
4	(United States) Brittany Denson	6	13	2.2
5	(Tunisia) Houda Hamrouni	7	14	2
6	(Kenya) Natalie Mwangale	6	12	2
7	(Burundi) Cynthia Irankunda	4	8	2
8	(Kenya) Yvonne Odhiambo	6	11	1.8
9	(Sudan) Zeinab Chan	4	7	1.8
10	(Nigeria) Juliet Currency	7	11	1.6

Blocks

Rank	Name	G	Bks	BPG
1	(United States) Brittany Denson	6	14	2.3
2	(Ivory Coast) Minata Fofana	7	11	1.6
3	(Angola) Nadir Manuel	7	10	1.4
4	(Angola) Ngiendula Filipe	7	6	0.9
4	(Democratic Republic of the Congo) Hortis Ahongi	7	6	0.9
6	(Angola) Angelina Golome	6	5	0.8
7	(Democratic Republic of the Congo) Betty Tshiniangu	7	5	0.7
8	(United States) Sequoia Holmes	7	4	0.6
8	(Togo) Akpene Kodjo	7	4	0.6
8	(Democratic Republic of the Congo) Cecile Nyoka	7	4	0.6

Turnovers

Rank	Name	G	Tos	TPG
1	(Kenya) Hilda Luvandwa	4	35	8.8
2	(Democratic Republic of the Congo) Natacha Teba	7	28	4
3	(Burundi) Cynthia Irankunda	4	15	3.8
4	(Nigeria) Ndidiamaka Nwakamma	7	26	3.7
5	(Kenya) Yvonne Odhiambo	6	22	3.7
6	(Nigeria) Juliet Currency	7	23	3.3
6	(Democratic Republic of the Congo) Hortis Ahongi	7	23	3.3
8	(Nigeria) Sarah Ogoke	6	20	3.3
9	(Democratic Republic of the Congo) Mireille Nyota	6	19	3.2
10	(Tunisia) Houda Hamrouni	7	20	2.9

2-point field goal percentage

Pos	Name	A	M	%
1	(Mozambique) Leia Dongue	58	39	67.2
2	(Nigeria) Priscilla Udeaja	58	34	58.6
3	(Democratic Republic of the Congo) Mireille Nyota	59	34	57.6
4	(Nigeria) Ndidi Madu	39	22	56.4
5	(United States) Brittany Denson	42	22	52.4
6	(Democratic Republic of the Congo) Hortis Ahongi	107	56	52.3
7	(United States) Italee Lucas	56	29	51.8
8	(Tunisia) Maherzia Ksouri	46	22	47.8
9	(Democratic Republic of the Congo) Betty Tshiniangu	82	39	47.6
10	(Serbia) Aleksandra Račić	55	26	47.3

3-point field goal percentage

Pos	Name	A	M	%
1	(Tunisia) Rim Trabelsi	12	5	41.7
2	(United States) Latia Williams	17	7	41.2
3	(United States) Italee Lucas	25	10	40
4	(Tunisia) Hela Msadek	20	8	40
5	(Angola) Indira José	15	6	40
6	(Angola) Sónia Guadalupe	21	8	38.1
7	(United States) Sequoia Holmes	32	12	37.5
8	(Angola) Ana Gonçalves	28	10	35.7
9	(Nigeria) Joyce Ekworomadu	29	10	34.5
10	(Nigeria) Tokunbo Olaosebikan	40	13	32.5

Free throw percentage

Pos	Name	A	M	%
1	(Nigeria) Joyce Ekworomadu	29	26	89.7
2	(Nigeria) Ndidi Madu	18	16	88.9
3	(United States) Brittany Denson	33	29	87.9
4	(Nigeria) Upe Atosu	27	23	85.2
5	(Nigeria) Priscilla Udeaja	28	23	82.1
6	(United States) Sequoia Holmes	26	21	80.8
7	(Togo) Akpene Kodjo	35	28	80
8	(United States) Italee Lucas	29	23	79.3
9	(Democratic Republic of the Congo) Thouraya Adsi	23	18	78.3
10	(Tunisia) Fatma Zagrouba	18	14	77.8

=== Individual Game Highs ===
Department	Name	Total	Opponent
Points	(Tunisia) Houda Hamrouni	32	(Kenya) USIU Flames
Rebounds	(Sudan) Zeinab Chan	18	(Nigeria) Dolphins
Assists	(Democratic Republic of the Congo) Mireille Tshiyoyo	8	(Kenya) USIU Flames
Steals	(Democratic Republic of the Congo) Cecile Nyoka	8	(Kenya) USIU Flames
Blocks	(Ivory Coast) Minata Fofana	6	(Kenya) USIU Flames
2-point field goal percentage	(Mozambique) Leia Dongue	100% (7/7)	(Kenya) K.P.A.
3-point field goal percentage	(Nigeria) Patience Okpe	100% (3/3)	(Tunisia) C.S.P.C.
Free throw percentage	(Serbia) Aleksandra Račić	100% (9/9)	(Kenya) K.P.A.
Turnovers	(Kenya) Hilda Luvandwa	10	(Democratic Republic of the Congo) I.N.S.S.

=== Team Tournament Highs ===
Points

Rank	Name	G	Pts	PPG
1	(Angola) Interclube	7	532	76
2	(Angola) 1º de Agosto	6	446	74.3
3	(Nigeria) Dolphins	7	514	73.4
4	(Democratic Republic of the Congo) I.N.S.S.	7	506	72.3
5	(Nigeria) First Bank	6	418	69.7
6	(Tunisia) C.S.P.C.	7	463	66.1
7	(Tunisia) CS Sfaxien	6	387	64.5
8	(Kenya) USIU Flames	4	232	58
9	(Kenya) K.P.A.	6	299	49.8

Rebounds

Rank	Name	G	Rbs	RPG
1	(Nigeria) Dolphins	7	335	47.9
2	(Democratic Republic of the Congo) I.N.S.S.	7	332	47.4
2	(Angola) Interclube	7	299	42.7
4	(Nigeria) First Bank	6	247	41.2
5	(Angola) 1º de Agosto	6	231	38.5
6	(Kenya) K.P.A.	6	220	36.7
7	(Kenya) USIU Flames	4	143	35.8
8	(Tunisia) C.S.P.C.	7	241	34.4
9	(Tunisia) CS Sfaxien	6	197	32.8

Assists

Rank	Name	G	Ast	APG
1	(Angola) Interclube	7	89	12.7
2	(Democratic Republic of the Congo) I.N.S.S.	7	77	11
3	(Nigeria) Dolphins	7	73	10.4
4	(Tunisia) C.S.P.C.	7	71	10.1
5	(Tunisia) CS Sfaxien	6	57	9.5
6	(Nigeria) First Bank	6	54	9
7	(Angola) 1º de Agosto	6	48	8
8	(Kenya) K.P.A.	6	47	7.8
9	(Kenya) USIU Flames	4	24	6

Steals

Rank	Name	G	Sts	SPG
1	(Kenya) USIU Flames	4	42	10.5
2	(Kenya) K.P.A.	6	55	9.2
3	(Tunisia) CS Sfaxien	6	53	8.8
4	(Tunisia) C.S.P.C.	7	61	8.7
5	(Democratic Republic of the Congo) I.N.S.S.	7	57	8.1
6	(Angola) Interclube	7	52	7.4
7	(Nigeria) Dolphins	7	51	7.3
8	(Angola) 1º de Agosto	6	40	6.7
9	(Nigeria) First Bank	6	38	6.3

Blocks

Rank	Name	G	Bks	BPG
1	(Angola) Interclube	7	26	3.7
2	(Tunisia) CS Sfaxien	6	16	2.7
3	(Nigeria) Dolphins	7	18	2.6
4	(Democratic Republic of the Congo) I.N.S.S.	7	11	1.6
5	(Tunisia) C.S.P.C.	7	10	1.4
6	(Nigeria) First Bank	6	7	1.2
7	(Kenya) USIU Flames	4	4	1
8	(Angola) 1º de Agosto	6	3	0.5
9	(Kenya) K.P.A.	6	2	0.3

Turnovers

Rank	Name	G	Tos	TPG
1	(Kenya) USIU Flames	4	88	22
2	(Democratic Republic of the Congo) I.N.S.S.	7	141	20.1
3	(Nigeria) Dolphins	7	140	20
4	(Kenya) K.P.A.	6	118	19.7
5	(Tunisia) C.S.P.C.	7	133	19
6	(Angola) Interclube	7	103	14.7
7	(Nigeria) First Bank	6	88	14.7
8	(Angola) 1º de Agosto	6	76	12.7
9	(Tunisia) CS Sfaxien	6	71	11.8

2-point field goal percentage

Pos	Name	%
1	(Angola) Interclube	51.9
2	(Democratic Republic of the Congo) I.N.S.S.	47.8
3	(Tunisia) C.S.P.C.	46.8
4	(Angola) 1º de Agosto	46.3
5	(Nigeria) First Bank	41.4
6	(Tunisia) CS Sfaxien	40.7
7	(Nigeria) Dolphins	40.4
8	(Kenya) K.P.A.	35.4
9	(Kenya) USIU Flames	32.2

3-point field goal percentage

Pos	Name	%
1	(Angola) 1º de Agosto	33.3
2	(Angola) Interclube	29.8
3	(Tunisia) CS Sfaxien	26.7
4	(Nigeria) First Bank	26.1
5	(Nigeria) Dolphins	25.6
6	(Tunisia) C.S.P.C.	24.8
7	(Kenya) K.P.A.	18.9
8	(Kenya) USIU Flames	18.5
9	(Democratic Republic of the Congo) I.N.S.S.	18.1

Free throw percentage

Pos	Name	%
1	(Nigeria) First Bank	76.9
2	(Tunisia) CS Sfaxien	74
3	(Angola) 1º de Agosto	71.8
4	(Angola) Interclube	68.9
5	(Nigeria) Dolphins	68.4
6	(Tunisia) C.S.P.C.	68.1
7	(Kenya) USIU Flames	65.2
8	(Democratic Republic of the Congo) I.N.S.S.	65
9	(Kenya) K.P.A.	57

=== Team Game highs ===
Department	Name	Total	Opponent
Points	(Nigeria) Dolphins	102	(Kenya) USIU Flames
Rebounds	(Democratic Republic of the Congo) I.N.S.S.	63	(Nigeria) Dolphins
Assists	(Democratic Republic of the Congo) I.N.S.S.	23	(Kenya) USIU Flames
Steals	(Democratic Republic of the Congo) I.N.S.S.	20	(Kenya) USIU Flames
Blocks	(Nigeria) Dolphins	10	(Kenya) USIU Flames
2-point field goal percentage	(Angola) Interclube	77.3% (34/44)	(Kenya) USIU Flames
3-point field goal percentage	(Angola) Interclube	50% (7/14)	(Kenya) USIU Flames
Free throw percentage	(Kenya) USIU Flames	84.6% (11/13)	(Democratic Republic of the Congo) I.N.S.S.
Turnovers	(Kenya) USIU Flames	31	(Democratic Republic of the Congo) I.N.S.S.

== All Tournament Team ==
G	(United States)	Italee Lucas
F	(United States)	Sequoia Holmes
F	(Angola)	Ana Gonçalves
C	(Mozambique)	Leia Dongue
C	(United States)	Brittany Denson

2014 FIBA Africa Women's Clubs Champions Cup

Grupo Desportivo Interclube
4th title

Most Valuable Player
(Mozambique) Leia Dongue

== See also ==
- 2013 FIBA Africa Championship for Women
