= 2010 FIBA Africa Women's Clubs Champions Cup =

2010 FIBA Africa Champions Cup for Women
16th FIBA Africa Champions Cup for Women

Tournament details
- Host country: Tunisia
- Dates: November 19 – 27
- Teams: 10
- Venue(s): 1 (in 1 host city)

Final positions
- Champions: Angola (Interclube's 1st title; Angola's 2nd th title)

Tournament statistics
- MVP: (United States) Danielle Green
- Top scorer: (Ivory Coast) Kani Kouyaté 24.42
- Top rebounds: (Mali) Ouleymatou Coulibaly 13.28

The 2010 FIBA Africa Women's Clubs Champions Cup (16th edition), was an international basketball tournament held in Bizerte, Tunisia, from November 19 to 27, 2010. The tournament, organized by FIBA Africa, and hosted by CSF Bizerte, was contested by 10 clubs split into 2 groups, the first four of which qualifying for the knock-out stage and the last four playing the consolation places.

The tournament was won by Interclube from Angola.

== Draw ==
Group A	Group B
(Democratic Republic of the Congo) Arc-en-Ciel (Ivory Coast) Club Sportif d'Abidjan (Tunisia) CSF Bizerte (Angola) Interclube (Madagascar) BC Mahamasina	(Ivory Coast) Abidjan Basket Club (Mozambique) Desportivo de Maputo (Nigeria) First Bank (Cameroon) INJS (Senegal) Saint-Louis Basket Club

== Preliminary rounds ==
Times given below are in UTC+1.

=== Group A ===
Qualified for the quarter-finals

	Group A	M	W	L	PF	PA	Diff	P
1.	(Angola) Interclube	4	4	0	330	204	+126	8
2.	(Tunisia) CSF Bizerte	4	2	2	250	183	+67	6
3.	(Ivory Coast) Club Sportif d'Abidjan	4	2	2	229	242	-13	6
4.	(Democratic Republic of the Congo) Arc-en-Ciel	4	1	3	263	257	+6	5
5.	(Madagascar) Mahamasina	4	1	3	125	321	-196	5

19 November 2010
14:00

Interclube (Angola)	98–53	(Madagascar) Mahamasina

18:00

CS Abidjan (Ivory Coast)	48–51	(Tunisia) CSF Bizerte

20 November 2010
14:00

Arc-en-Ciel (Democratic Republic of the Congo)	69–80	(Ivory Coast) CS Abidjan

20:00

CSF Bizerte (Tunisia)	66–65	(Madagascar) Mahamasina

21 November 2010
12:00

CS Abidjan (Ivory Coast)	61–82	(Angola) Interclube

18:00

CSF Bizerte (Tunisia)	66–57	(Democratic Republic of the Congo) Arc-en-Ciel

22 November 2010
14:00

Mahamasina (Madagascar)	73–84	(Democratic Republic of the Congo) Arc-en-Ciel

18:00

Interclube (Angola)	84–53	(Tunisia) CSF Bizerte

23 November 2010
14:00

Arc-en-Ciel (Democratic Republic of the Congo)	30–68	(Angola) Interclube

18:00

Mahamasina (Madagascar)	56–70	(Ivory Coast) CS Abidjan

=== Group B ===
Qualified for the quarter-finals

	Group B	M	W	L	PF	PA	Diff	P
1.	(Mozambique) Desportivo de Maputo	4	4	0	249	199	+50	8
2.	(Ivory Coast) Abidjan Basket Club	4	3	1	240	178	+62	7
3.	(Nigeria) First Bank	4	2	2	213	166	+47	6
4.	(Cameroon) INJS	4	1	3	220	225	-5	5
5.	(Senegal) St Louis	4	0	4	186	271	-85	4

19 November 2010
12:00

Desp Maputo (Mozambique)	93–21	(Senegal) St Louis

20:00

First Bank (Nigeria)	63–59	(Cameroon) INJS

20 November 2010
16:00

Abidjan BC (Ivory Coast)	62–69	(Mozambique) Desp Maputo

20:00

St Louis (Senegal)	52–65	(Nigeria) First Bank

21 November 2010
10:00

INJS (Cameroon)	55–60	(Ivory Coast) Abidjan BC

10:00

Desp Maputo (Mozambique)	72–57	(Nigeria) First Bank

22 November 2010
12:00

INJS (Cameroon)	34–78	(Mozambique) Desp Maputo

20:00

Abidjan BC (Ivory Coast)	48–38	(Senegal) St Louis

23 November 2010
16:00

First Bank (Nigeria)	46–56	(Ivory Coast) Abidjan BC

20:00

St Louis (Senegal)	57–58	(Cameroon) INJS

== Knockout stage ==
Quarter-finals
Thursday, 25 November
(Cameroon) INJS	27
(Angola) Interclube	77
Thursday, 25 November
(Ivory Coast) CS Abidjan	60
(Ivory Coast) Abidjan BC	77
Thursday, 25 November
(Democratic Republic of the Congo) Arc-en-Ciel	55
(Mozambique) Desp Maputo	87
Thursday, 25 November
(Nigeria) First Bank	69
(Tunisia) CSF Bizerte	51

5th-8th Place
Friday, 26 November
(Cameroon) INJS	48
(Ivory Coast) CS Abidjan	68
Friday, 26 November
(Democratic Republic of the Congo) Arc-en-Ciel	56
(Tunisia) CSF Bizerte	73

5th place
Saturday, 27 November
(Ivory Coast) CS Abidjan	64
(Tunisia) CSF Bizerte	58
7th place
Saturday, 27 November
(Cameroon) INJS	75
(Democratic Republic of the Congo) Arc-en-Ciel	43

Quarter-finals
Thursday, 25 November
(Cameroon) INJS	27
(Angola) Interclube	77
Thursday, 25 November
(Ivory Coast) CS Abidjan	60
(Ivory Coast) Abidjan BC	77
Thursday, 25 November
(Democratic Republic of the Congo) Arc-en-Ciel	55
(Mozambique) Desp Maputo	87
Thursday, 25 November
(Nigeria) First Bank	69
(Tunisia) CSF Bizerte	51

Semi-finals
Friday, 26 November
(Angola) Interclube	64
(Cameroon) Abidjan BC	47
Friday, 26 November
(Mozambique) Desp Maputo	79
(Nigeria) First Bank	51

Final
Saturday, 27 November
(Angola) Interclube	77
(Mozambique) Desp Maputo	63
Third place
Saturday, 27 November
(Ivory Coast) Abidjan BC	58
(Nigeria) First Bank	55

=== Quarter-finals ===
25 November 2010
13:00

INJS (Cameroon)	27–77	(Angola) Interclube

15:00

CS Abidjan (Ivory Coast)	60–77	(Ivory Coast) Abidjan BC

17:00

First Bank (Nigeria)	69–51	(Tunisia) CSF Bizerte

19:00

Arc-en-Ciel (Democratic Republic of the Congo)	55–87	(Mozambique) Desp Maputo

=== 9th place ===
25 November 2010
11:00

Mahamasina (Madagascar)	79–54	(Senegal) St Louis

=== 5th-8th place ===
26 November 2010
13:00

CSF Bizerte (Tunisia)	73–56	(Democratic Republic of the Congo) Arc-en-Ciel

15:00

CSA (Ivory Coast)	68–48	(Cameroon) INJS

=== Semifinals ===
26 November 2010
17:00

Interclube (Angola)	64–47	(Ivory Coast) Abidjan BC
Scoring by quarter: 16-6, 15-12, 14-11, 19-18
Pts: Astrida 14		Pts: Kalanga, Camara 8

26 November 2010
19:00

Desp Maputo (Mozambique)	79–51	(Nigeria) First Bank
Pts: Jones 20		Pts: Ojelabi 19

=== 7th place ===
27 November 2010
13:00

INJS (Cameroon)	75–43	(Democratic Republic of the Congo) Arc-en-Ciel

=== 5th place ===
27 November 2010
13:30

CS Abidjan (Ivory Coast)	64–58	(Tunisia) CSF Bizerte

=== Bronze medal game ===
27 November 2010
15:30

Abidjan BC (Ivory Coast)	58–55	(Nigeria) First Bank

=== Gold medal game ===
27 November 2010
17:00

Interclube (Angola)	77–63	(Mozambique) Desp Maputo
Scoring by quarter: 21-16, 18-19, 17-17, 21-11

== Final standings ==
Rank	Team	Record
Gold medal	(Angola) Interclube	7–0
Silver medal	(Mozambique) Desp de Maputo	6–1
Bronze medal	(Ivory Coast) Abidjan Basket Club	5–2
4.	(Nigeria) First Bank	3–4
5.	(Ivory Coast) Club Sportif d'Abidjan	4–3
6.	(Tunisia) CSF Bizerte	3–4
7.	(Cameroon) INJS	2–5
8.	(Democratic Republic of the Congo) Arc-en-Ciel	1–6
9.	(Madagascar) BC Mahamasina	2–3
10.	(Senegal) St Louis	0–5

Interclube roster
Astrida Vicente, Catarina Camufal, Danielle Green, Felizarda Jorge, Irene Guerreiro, Nadir Manuel, Ngiendula Filipe, Sónia Guadalupe, Coach: Apolinário Paquete

== All Tournament Team ==
G	(United States)	Danielle Green
G	(Ivory Coast)	Kani Kouyaté
SF	(Mozambique)	Leia Dongue
PF	(Angola)	Nadir Manuel
C	(Nigeria)	Olejabi Funmilayo

2010 FIBA Africa Women's Clubs Champions Cup

Grupo Desportivo Interclube
1st Title

Most Valuable Player
(United States) Danielle Green

== See also ==
- 2011 FIBA Africa Championship for Women
