= 2011 FIBA Africa Women's Clubs Champions Cup =

2011 FIBA Africa Champions Cup for Women
17th FIBA Africa Champions Cup for Women

Tournament details
- Host country: Nigeria
- Dates: December 5 – 11
- Teams: 5 (from 53 federations)
- Venue: 1 (in 1 host city)

Final positions
- Champions: Angola (Interclube's 2nd title; Angola's 3rd title)

Tournament statistics
- MVP: (United States) Danielle Green
- Top scorer: (Nigeria) Nkechi Akashili
- Top rebounds: (Nigeria) Chinyere Ibekwe

The 2011 FIBA Africa Women's Clubs Champions Cup (17th edition) was an international basketball tournament that took place at the Indoor Sports Hall of the National Stadium in Surulele, Lagos, Nigeria, from December 5 to 11, 2011. The tournament, organized by FIBA Africa, and hosted by First Deepwater, was contested by 5 clubs in a round robin system followed by a third-place match played by the 3rd and 4th placed teams from the preliminary round and a final played by the two top teams from the same round.

The tournament was won by Interclube from Angola, thus retaining its title. It was Interclube's 2nd title and Angola's 3rd.

== Participating teams ==
(Angola) Desportivo do Maculusso
(Nigeria) First Bank
(Nigeria) First Deepwater
(Angola) Interclube
(Kenya) KPA

== Preliminary round ==
Times given below are in UTC+1.

Qualified for the semi-finals

	Teams	M	W	L	PF	PA	Diff	P
1.	(Angola) Interclube	4	4	0	330	204	+126	7
2.	(Nigeria) First Bank	4	3	1	250	183	+67	7
3.	(Nigeria) First Deepwater	4	2	2	229	242	-13	6
4.	(Angola) Desportivo do Maculusso	4	2	2	263	257	+6	6
5.	(Kenya) KPA	4	1	4	125	321	-196	4

5 December 2011
16:00

F. Deepwater (Nigeria)	64–46	(Angola) Maculusso
Scoring by quarter: 17-9, 16-10, 14-12, 17-15
Pts: Ibekwe 21; Rebs: Ibekwe 12; Asts: Atosu 3		Pts: Joana 9 Rebs: Marisa 5 Asts: Rosemira 3

18:00

Interclube (Angola)	81–33	(Kenya) KPA
Scoring by quarter: 23-7, 17-4, 26-7, 15-15
Pts: Astrida 19; Rebs: Luísa 13; Asts: Green 7		Pts: Olang 7 Rebs: Odhiambo 5 Asts: Oketch 3

6 December 2011
16:00

KPA (Kenya)	49–93	(Nigeria) First Bank
Scoring by quarter: 7-27, 7-17, 12-22, 23-27
Pts: Makau 12; Rebs: Odhiambo 4 Asts: Oketch 6		Pts: Ukato 16; Rebs: Wylie 16; Asts: Adibeli 6

18:00

Maculusso (Angola)	30–80	(Angola) Interclube
Scoring by quarter: 10-14, 9-23, 6-18, 5-25
Pts: Marisa 12; Rebs: L.Cutano 6 Asts: Elsa 1		Pts: Green 15; Rebs: Nadir 8 Asts: Sónia 4

7 December 2011
16:00

Interclube (Angola)	82–75	(Nigeria) F. Deepwater

18:00

First Bank (Nigeria)	72–55	(Angola) Maculusso

8 December 2011
16:00

KPA (Kenya)	56–59	(Angola) Maculusso

18:00

First Bank (Nigeria)	58–54	(Nigeria) F. Deepwater

9 December 2011
16:00

Interclube (Angola)	67–62	(Nigeria) First Bank

18:00

F. Deepwater (Nigeria)	78–50	(Kenya) KPA

10 December 2011
16:00

Interclube (Angola)	75–30	(Angola) Maculusso

18:00

First Bank (Nigeria)	58–54	(Nigeria) F. Deepwater

== Final round ==
=== Bronze medal game ===
11 December 2011
15:30

F. Deepwater (Nigeria)	66–57	(Angola) Maculusso

=== Final ===
11 December 2011
18:00

Interclube (Angola)	81–55	(Nigeria) First Bank
Scoring by quarter: 12-10, 19-13, 28-19, 22-13

Indoor Sports Hall, Surulele, Lagos

== Final standings ==
Rank	Team	Record
Gold medal	(Angola) Interclube	4–0
Silver medal	(Nigeria) First Bank	3–1
Bronze medal	(Nigeria) First Deepwater	2–2
4.	(Angola) Desp do Maculusso	2–2
5.	(Kenya) KPA	1–4

== All Tournament Team ==
G	(Nigeria)	Sarah Ogoke
G	(Angola)	Catarina Camufal
SF	(United States)	Danielle Green
PF	(Angola)	Sónia Guadalupe
C	(Nigeria)	Rashidat Sadiq

2011 FIBA Africa Women's Clubs Champions Cup

Grupo Desportivo Interclube
2nd Title

Most Valuable Player
(United States) Danielle Green

== See also ==
- 2011 FIBA Africa Championship for Women
