= Rosa Gala =

Angolan basketball player

No. 7 – Primeiro de Agosto
- Position: Small forward
- League: Angolan League; Africa Club Champions Cup

Personal information
- Born: 17 April 1995 (age 31) Lubango, Angola
- Listed height: 173 cm (5 ft 8 in)
- Listed weight: 62 kg (137 lb)

Career information
- Playing career: 2007–present

Career history
- 2007–2011: Benfica Lubango
- 2012–present: Primeiro de Agosto

Career highlights
- 2011 Afrobasket U-16 top scorer

Rosa Maria Luísa Gala (born 17 April 1995) is an Angolan female basketball player.

Born in Lubango, Gala was selected to play for the Angola women's national basketball team that won bronze at the 2011 FIBA Africa Under-16 Championship. the following year she was selected for the 2012 FIBA Africa Under-18 Championship. She was selected for the Angola women's national basketball team's pre-squad for the 2013 Afrobasket but was later dismissed for failing to meet age requirements.

Gala's club side, C.D. Primeiro de Agosto, came second in the 2013 FIBA Africa Women's Clubs Champions Cup. She again represented Angola in basketball at the 2014 Lusophony Games, winning silver. She also played for Angola at the 2014 FIBA World Championship for Women and in basketball at the 2015 African Games – Women's tournament.
