= Sequoia Holmes =

American basketball player (born 1986)

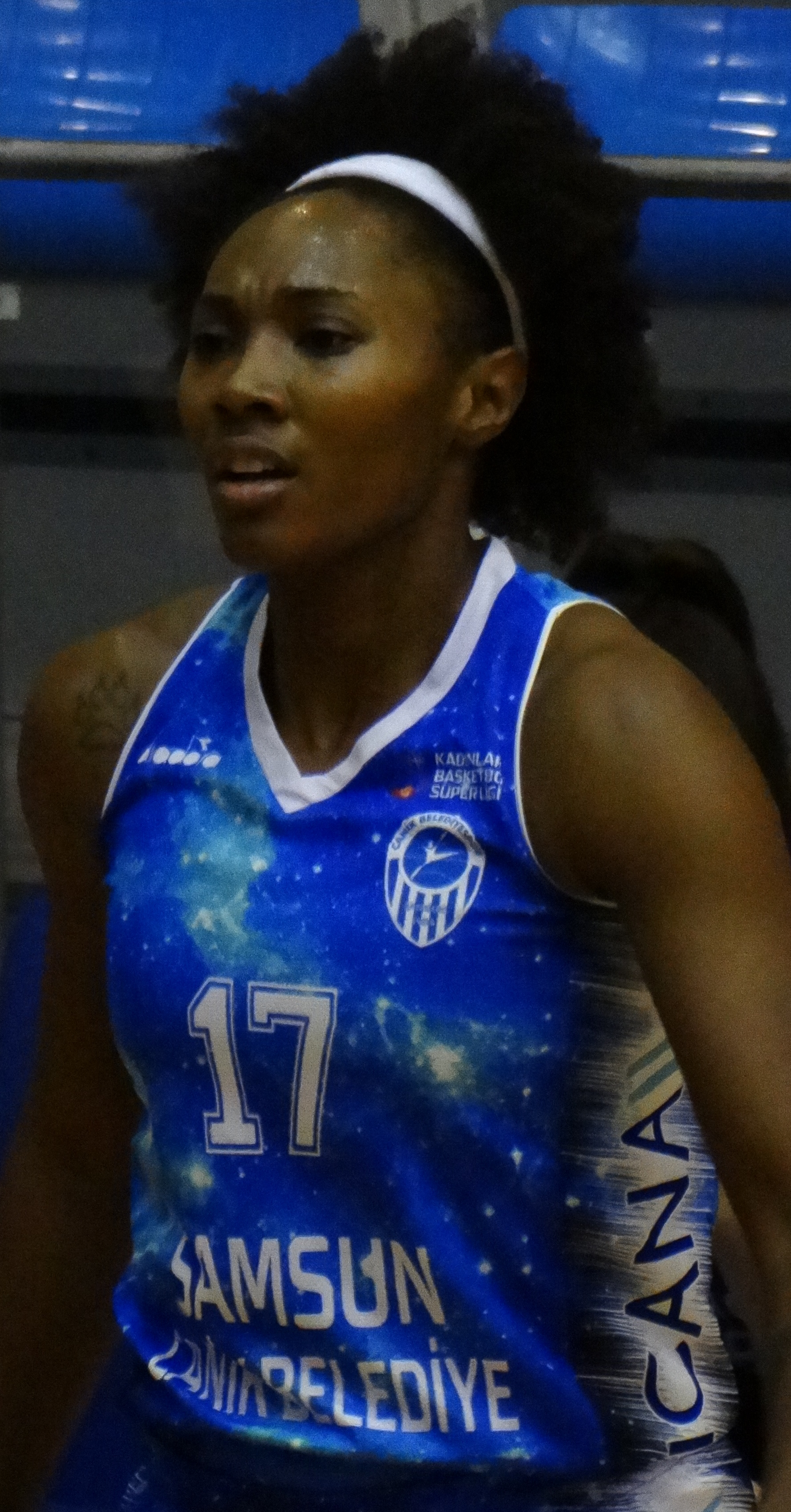

Personal information
- Born: June 13, 1986 (age 40) North Las Vegas, Nevada, U.S.
- Listed height: 6 ft 1 in (1.85 m)
- Listed weight: 155 lb (70 kg)

Career information
- High school: Mojave (North Las Vegas, Nevada)
- College: UNLV (2004–2008)
- WNBA draft: 2008: undrafted
- Playing career: 2008–2018
- Position: Guard

Career history
- 2008: Houston Comets
- 2010: Phoenix Mercury
- 2014–2017: Interclube
- 2017: San Antonio Stars
- 2017-18: Bnei Yehuda
- 2018: Las Vegas Aces
- 2018-2019: Canik Belediyesi
- 2019-2020: Hapoel Rishon LeZion
- 2020–2021: Hapoel Holon
- 2021–2022: Panathinaikos

Career highlights
- MWC Defensive Player of the Year (2007); First-team All-MWC (2007)
- Stats at WNBA.com
- Stats at Basketball Reference
Medals
Women's basketball
FIBA Africa Clubs Champions Cup
Gold medal – first place	Sfax 2014	Interclube
Silver medal – second place	Luanda 2015	Interclube

Sequoia Antrice Holmes (born June 13, 1986) is an American professional basketball player.

== Career statistics ==
=== WNBA ===
==== Regular season ====
Year	Team	GP	GS	MPG	FG%	3P%	FT%	RPG	APG	SPG	BPG	TO	PPG
2008	Houston	17	**3**	**11.9**	25.8	23.5	72.7	**2.1**	0.6	**0.5**	0.1	0.8	3.1
2009	Did not play (waived)												
2010	Phoenix	15	0	7.9	20.5	0.0	**73.3**	1.3	0.4	0.4	0.0	0.7	1.8
2011	Did not play (waived)												
2012	Did not play (did not appear in WNBA)												
2013	Did not play (did not appear in WNBA)												
2014	Did not play (did not appear in WNBA)												
2015	Did not play (did not appear in WNBA)												
2016	Did not play (did not appear in WNBA)												
2017	San Antonio	**27**	**3**	11.3	**34.4**	**29.2**	61.5	0.9	**0.9**	**0.5**	0.2	**0.4**	**3.3**
2018	Las Vegas	3	0	6.7	66.7	0.0	0.0	0.7	0.7	0.3	**0.7**	0.7	1.3
Career	4 years, 3 teams	62	6	10.5	29.5	23.7	68.6	1.3	0.7	0.5	0.1	0.6	2.8

==== Playoffs ====
Year	Team	GP	GS	MPG	FG%	3P%	FT%	RPG	APG	SPG	BPG	TO	PPG
2010	Phoenix	1	0	1.0	0.0	0.0	0.0	0.0	0.0	0.0	0.0	0.0	0.0
Career	1 year, 1 team	1	0	1.0	0.0	0.0	0.0	0.0	0.0	0.0	0.0	0.0	0.0

=== College ===
Legend
GP	Games played	GS	Games started	MPG	Minutes per game
FG%	Field goal percentage	3P%	3-point field goal percentage	FT%	Free throw percentage
RPG	Rebounds per game	APG	Assists per game	SPG	Steals per game
BPG	Blocks per game	PPG	Points per game	**Bold**	Career high

Year	Team	GP	Points	FG%	3P%	FT%	RPG	APG	SPG	BPG	PPG
2004-05	UNLV	**31**	255	**46.8**	15.4	**68.4**	5.0	0.9	1.7	**0.8**	8.2
2005-06	UNLV	30	267	43.1	**30.4**	62.0	4.3	**2.7**	2.2	0.5	8.9
2006-07	UNLV	29	413	36.9	29.2	56.9	6.3	2.4	**2.6**	0.6	14.2
2007-08	UNLV	30	**550**	39.5	30.2	62.4	**7.3**	2.6	2.3	0.7	**18.3**
Career	UNLV	120	1485	40.4	29.2	61.8	5.7	2.2	2.2	0.7	12.4

== Professional career ==
She played in Greece for Panathinaikos during the 2021-22 season.
