= Ramata Daou =

Malian-born Senegalese basketball player

Personal information
- Born: March 23, 1988 (age 38) Bamako, Mali
- Listed height: 6 ft 8 in (2.03 m)
- Position: Center
Medals
Women's basketball
Representing Senegal
AfroBasket
Silver medal – second place	2017 Mali

Ramata Daou (born March 23, 1988) is a Malian-born Senegalese basketball player for the Senegalese national team.

She participated at the 2017 Women's Afrobasket.
