= Eagle Wings =

2021 Nigerian war action drama film by Paul Apel Papel

- English
- Directed by: Paul Apel Papel
- Written by: Paul Apel Papel
- Produced by: Paul Apel Papel
- Starring: Enyinna Nwigwe Femi Jacobs Yakubu Mohammed Francis Duru Sadiq Daba Keppy Ekpeyong Uzee Usman Saeed Muhammed Patience Ujah Jamila Ibrahim Abdul Zada
- Cinematography: Pindem Lot
- Edited by: Paul Apel Papel
- Music by: Chuck Okudo
- Production companies: Papel Productions; Nigerian Airforce
- Release dates: 25 February 2021 (Abuja); 12 March 2021
- Running time: 2h 7min
- Country: Nigeria
- Languages: English; Hausa; Igbo yoruba Tiv
- Budget: N145,000,000

Eagle Wings also known as Eagle Wings: an Air Force Story is a 2021 Nigerian war action drama film directed by Paul Apel Papel. It is described as Nigeria's first military based film. The film production also historically marked the first instance of a major collaboration between the Nigerian military and Nollywood film industry. The film's plot is based on the struggles, dedication and sacrifices of the Nigerian Airforce soldiers and their fight against the insurgency in the Northern part of Nigeria. The film had its theatrical release on 12 March 2021 and opened to mixed reviews from critics.

== Cast ==
- Enyinna Nwigwe as Nuru Yusuf
- Femi Jacobs as Paul Dike
- Yakubu Muhammed as Yisa Doko
- Uzee Usman as Korinjo
- Funky Mallam as 2Ic Zango
- Patience Ujah
- Sadiq Daba as President of Nigeria
- Francis Duru as AVM Petinrin
- Paul Apel Papel as John Femi
- Abdul U. Zada as Baku
- Jamila Ibrahim as Amina
- Iyke Odiase
- Nazareth Jesse
- Sidney Idiala
- Stephanie Apel

== Production ==
Paul Apel Papel announced the directorial venture and also helmed as the producer of the film under his production banner Papel Productions. Nigerian Air Force also came on board as co-producers of the film project thus making it the first collaboration between Nigerian Film Corporation and Nigerian Air Force Investments Limited. As per reports; it was during November 2019 that Nigerian military reportedly collaborated with the Nigerian Film Corporation to produce a military film. The film story was made based on real life stories of the Nigerian military personnel and it was officially confirmed by the Nigerian Ministry of Defence on Twitter.

The principal photography of the Eagle Wings began on 25 February 2020 which is also the Birthday of the Producer/Director Paul Apel Papel in the state of Kaduna. The filming proceeded on full swing starting from February 2020 until April 2020. The filming was also partly disrupted due to the COVID-19 pandemic but the production continued with the support of the Nigerian military. The Nigerian Airforce was reported to have provided the necessary voluntary financial assistance, equipment and logistics to facilitate the smooth production of the film. The film was shot using real aircraft and weapons of the Nigerian Air Force.

The film was predominantly set at the air force base facilities in Kaduna, Maiduguri and Abuja. It was also revealed that the Nigerian Airforce provided training to the cast members of the film.

High quality cameras and warfare devices were used for the film and it became the first Nigerian film to utilise major warfare equipment. It also became the first Nollywood film ever to be shot using the Atlaslenses Orion 2x anamorphic lenses on the Arri Alexa mini cameras. In fact, the motion picture segments were shot on Arri film camera with the Open Gate format at 4444XQ codec using the anamorphic lenses.

The post-production work was completed at the Papel Image Tech media outfit in Abuja. The film also marked the posthumous release of Sadiq Daba who was roped into play the role as the President of Nigeria.

== Release ==
The film was premiered in Abuja exactly one year after on 25 February 2021 and it was premiered in Lagos on 7 March 2021 prior to the nationwide theatrical release on 12 March 2021.

== Awards and nominations ==
Year	Award	Category	Recipient	Result	Ref
2021	Africa Movie Academy Awards	Achievement in Costume Design	Eagle Wings	Nominated	
2022	Nollywood Travel Film Festival	Best Movie	Eagle Wings	Winner	
