= Italee Lucas =

American-Angolan basketball player

No. 6 – Interclube
- Position: Shooting guard

Personal information
- Born: January 12, 1989 (age 37) Las Vegas, Nevada, U.S.
- Listed height: 5 ft 9 in (1.75 m)

Career information
- High school: Centennial (Las Vegas, Nevada)
- College: North Carolina (2007–2011)
- WNBA draft: 2011: 2nd round, 21st overall pick
- Drafted by: Tulsa Shock
- Playing career: 2011–present

Career history
- Miskolc
- Hondar-Irun
- CSM Satu-Mare
- Bnot Hertzellya
- G.D. Interclube

Career highlights
- McDonald's All-American (2007)
- Stats at Basketball Reference
Medals
Women's basketball
Representing the United States
FIBA Under-19 World Cup
Gold medal – first place	2007 Slovakia	Team
FIBA Under-18 Americas Championship
Gold medal – first place	2006 United States	Team

Italee Lucas (born January 12, 1989) is an Angolan American professional basketball player.

Born in the United States, in 2015 Lucas was granted Angolan citizenship and became eligible to play for the Angolan Women's Basketball Team

== High school ==
Lucas won a state championship with Centennial High School in 2006 and 2007.

Lucas won the 2007 Powerade Jam fest high school 3 point shootout.

== USA Basketball ==
Lucas was a member of the USA team which competed in the U18 championship in Colorado Springs, Colorado in June 2006. The team won all four games, earning the gold-medal and a qualification for the 2007 U19 world championship. She continued with the team the following year when the team competed in the U19 championship in Bratislava, Slovakia in August 2007. She averaged 4.9 points per game and recorded 23 assists second highest on the team is the USA team won all nine games and the gold-medal.

== College ==
Lucas finished her final season at University of North Carolina at Chapel Hill averaging 16.2 points, 3.1 rebounds, and 2.6 assists per game in the 2010–11 season.

== North Carolina statistics ==
Legend
GP	Games played	GS	Games started	MPG	Minutes per game
FG%	Field goal percentage	3P%	3-point field goal percentage	FT%	Free throw percentage
RPG	Rebounds per game	APG	Assists per game	SPG	Steals per game
BPG	Blocks per game	PPG	Points per game	**Bold**	Career high

Year	Team	GP	Points	FG%	3P%	FT%	RPG	APG	SPG	BPG	PPG
2007-08	North Carolina	36	178	36.6	27.3	60.0	1.7	2.7	1.2	-	4.9
2008-09	North Carolina	35	486	**46.1**	**39.3**	**79.0**	3.5	**2.8**	**1.7**	0.1	13.9
2009-10	North Carolina	30	441	40.0	34.4	78.4	**3.8**	2.5	1.5	0.1	14.7
2010-11	North Carolina	**37**	**598**	43.5	33.6	75.3	3.1	2.6	1.2	0.1	**16.2**
Career	North Carolina	138	1703	42.4	34.6	76.0	3.0	2.7	1.4	0.1	12.3

== Awards ==
- USA U18 National Team -06
- Gold Medal Tournament of the Americas U18 -06
- USA U19 National Team -07
- Gold Medal U19 World Championship - 07
- ACC Regular Season Champion -08
- ACC Tournament Winner -08
- ACC Tournament Semifinals -09
- ACC All-Tournament 2nd Team -09
- All-ACC 2nd Team -10, 11
- ACC All-Tournament 1st Team -11
- ACC Tournament Finalist -11
- NCAA Sweet 16 -11
- Afrobasket.com All-African Champions Cup MVP -13
- Afrobasket.com All-African Champions Cup Best Guard -13
- Afrobasket.com All-African Champions Cup 1st Team -13
- African Champions Cup Winner -13
- African SuperCup Champion - 13
- African Championship Champion - 13
- Selected as a 2007 McDonald's and WBCA All-American.
- Tabbed as a 2007 Gatorade State Player of the Year.
- Honored as a 2007 Parade Magazine and EA Sports All-America first team member and a USA Today All-USA second team member.
- Named a Parade Magazine All-America second team member in 2006.
- Tabbed as a Street & Smith's All-America sixth team member in 2006.
- Highlighted as the Las Vegas Review-Journal Nevada Player of the Year in 2006 and 2007.
- Honored as the state MVP in 2004-2007 and as the district MVP in 2005 and 2006.
- An all-region selection in 2004, 2005 and 2006
- All-conference selection in 2004, 2005, 2006 and 2007.
- Iraqi women's league best three pointer award
