= Meiya Tireira =

Malian basketball player (born 1986)

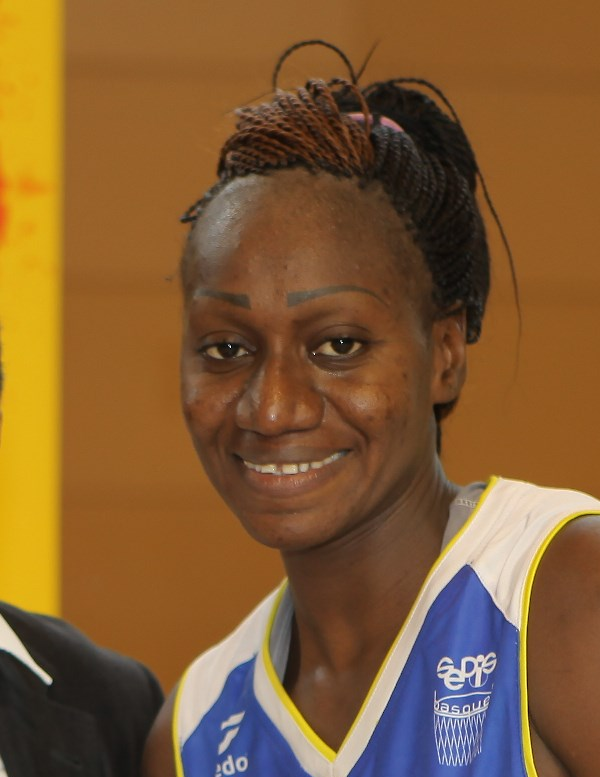

No. 13 – Valencia Basket
- Position: Forward / center
- League: LFB

Personal information
- Born: 15 April 1986 (age 40) Bamako, Mali
- Listed height: 1.87 m (6 ft 2 in)

Career information
- WNBA draft: 2008: undrafted
- Playing career: 2012–present

Career history
- 2012–2013: Sfaxien
- 2013–2014: Interclube
- 2016–2017: Sedis
- 2017–present: Valencia
Medals
Women's basketball
Representing Mali
African Games
Gold medal – first place	2015 Brazzaville	Team
AfroBasket
Bronze medal – third place	2017 Mali
Bronze medal – third place	2019 Senegal

Meiya Tireira (born 15 April 1986) is a Malian women's basketball player for Valencia Basket in the Spanish Women's League. A member of the Mali women's national basketball team, Tireira competed in all 5 of Mali's matches at the 2008 Summer Olympics, scoring a total of 16 points and grabbing 19 rebounds.
