= Nkechi Akashili =

Nigerian basketball player

No. 8 – First Bank
- Position: Guard
- League: NWPL

Personal information
- Born: 22 February 1990 (age 36) Warri, Nigeria
- Listed height: 5 ft 7 in (1.70 m)
- Listed weight: 143 lb (65 kg)

Career information
- WNBA draft: 2012: undrafted
Medals
Women's basketball
Representing Nigeria
African Games (All-Africa Games)
Silver medal – second place	2015 Brazzaville	Team
Bronze medal – third place	2011 Maputo	Team
AfroBasket
Gold medal – first place	2017 Mali

Nkechi Akashili (born 22 February 1990) is a Nigerian basketball player for First Bank B.C. and the Nigerian national team.

== International career ==
She participated at the 2017 Women's Afrobasket.
