= Luzia Simão =

Angolan basketball player

No. 17 – Interclube
- Position: Shooting guard
- League: Angolan League; Africa Club Champions Cup

Personal information
- Born: Luzia Adão Simão; 20 February 1992 (age 34) Barra do Dande, Angola
- Listed height: 168 cm (5 ft 6 in)

Career history
- 2008–present: Interclube

Luzia Adão Simão (born 20 February 1992) is an Angolan basketball player. She competed for Angola at the 2011 FIBA Africa Championship. She is 5 ft 5 inches tall.
