= Upe Atosu =

Nigerian basketball player

Personal information
- Born: 21 April 1993 (age 33) Edo State, Nigeria
- Listed height: 5 ft 5 in (1.65 m)
- Listed weight: 117 lb (53 kg)

Career information
- College: Butler Bulldogs
- Playing career: 2015–present
- Position: Guard
- Number: 21

Career history
- 2015-2017: First Bank
Medals
Women's basketball
Representing Nigeria
African Games
Silver medal – second place	2015 Brazzaville	Team
AfroBasket
Gold medal – first place	2017 Mali

Upe Atosu (born 21 April 1993) is a Nigerian basketball player for Butler Bulldogs women's basketball and the Nigerian national team.

She participated at the 2017 Women's Afrobasket.
