= Leia Dongue =

Mozambican basketball player

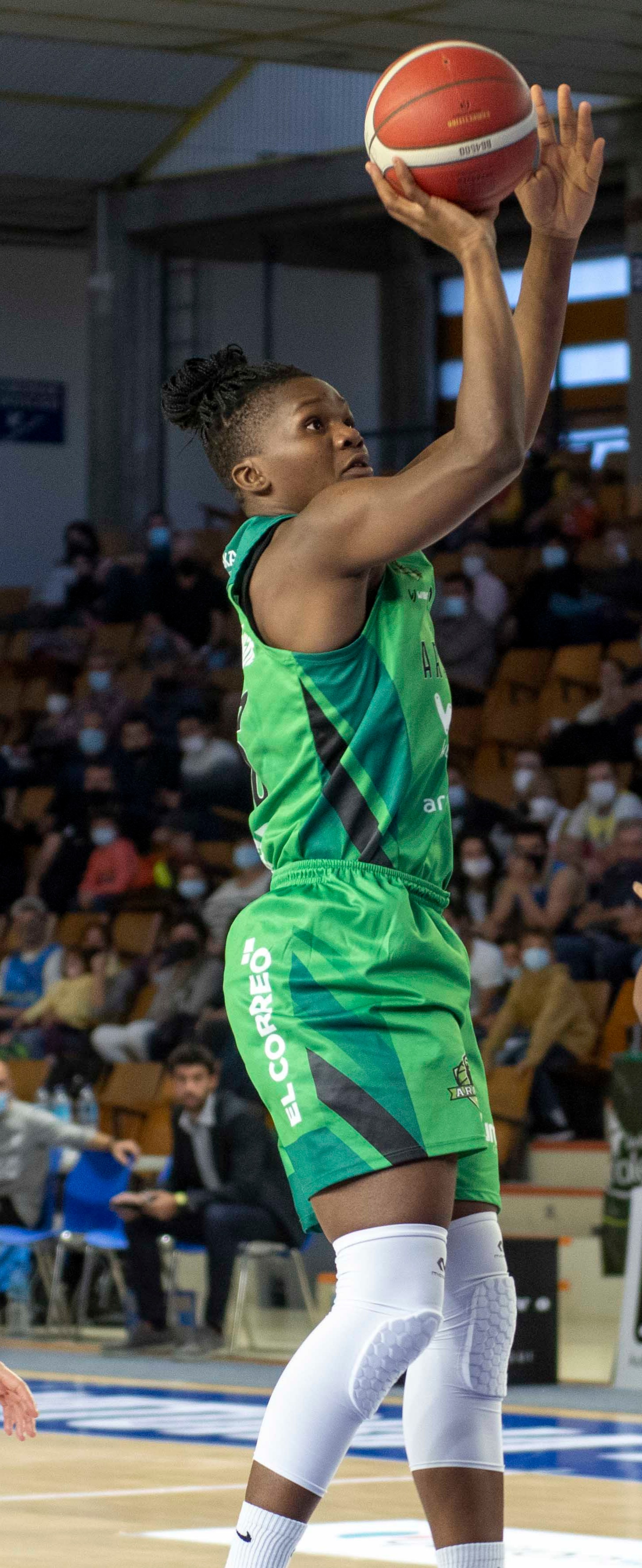

Araski AES
- Position: Power forward
- League: Angola National League

Personal information
- Born: 24 May 1991 (age 35) Maputo
- Listed height: 185 cm (6.07 ft)

Career information
- Playing career: 2004–present

Career history
- 2004–2011: Desportivo de Maputo
- 2011–2013: Liga Muçulmana
- 2013–2018: Primeiro de Agosto
- 2018–present: Gernika Bizkaia

Career highlights
- 2× FIBA Africa Champions Cup MVP (2014, 2015)

Leia Tânia do Bastião Dongue (born 24 May 1991) is a Mozambican basketball player. She is 185 cm (6 ft 1 in) and plays as a small forward.

In May 2013, she was signed in by Primeiro de Agosto.

Tanucha was voted MVP at the 2014 Angola Women's Basketball League and at the 2014 and 2015 FIBA Africa Clubs Champions Cup.
