= Catarina Camufal =

Angolan basketball player

Personal information
- Born: 30 March 1980 (age 46) Luanda, Angola
- Listed height: 168 cm (5 ft 6 in)
- Listed weight: 67 kg (148 lb)
- Position: Point guard

Catarina Juliana Camufal (born 30 March 1980) is a former Angolan basketball player. At the 2012 Summer Olympics, she competed for the Angola women's national basketball team in the women's event. She is 5 ft 6 inches tall.
