= Sónia Ndoniema =

Angolan basketball player (born 1985)

No. 10 – Primeiro de Agosto
- Position: Power forward
- League: Angolan League; Africa Club Champions Cup

Personal information
- Born: 15 September 1985 (age 41) Luanda, Angola
- Listed height: 188 cm (6 ft 2 in)
- Listed weight: 77 kg (170 lb)

Career information
- Playing career: 2002–present

Career history
- 2002–2010: Primeiro de Agosto
- 2010–2013: Interclube
- 2013–: Primeiro de Agosto

Sónia Sebastião Guadalupe Ndoniema (born 15 September 1985) is an Angolan basketball player. At the 2012 Summer Olympics, she competed for the Angola women's national basketball team in the women's event. She is 6 feet 2 inches tall.

Sónia is married to fellow Angolan basketball player Edson Ndoniema.
