= Ngiendula Filipe =

Angolan basketball player

No. 15 – Interclube
- Position: Small forward
- League: Angolan League; Africa Club Champions Cup

Personal information
- Born: 20 May 1982 (age 44) Luanda, Angola
- Listed height: 180 cm (5 ft 11 in)
- Listed weight: 72 kg (159 lb)

Ngiendula Makananu Filipe (born 20 May 1982) is an Angolan women's basketball player. At the 2012 Summer Olympics, she competed for the Angola women's national basketball team in the women's event. She is 180 centimetres (5 ft 11 in) tall.
