= Felizarda Jorge =

Angolan basketball player (born 1985)

No. 13 – Interclube
- Position: Power forward
- League: Angolan League; Africa Club Champions Cup

Personal information
- Born: 23 February 1985 (age 41) Luanda, Angola
- Listed height: 180 cm (5 ft 11 in)
- Listed weight: 78 kg (172 lb)

Career information
- Playing career: 2002–present

Career history
- 2002–2009: Maculusso
- 2009–2011: Interclube
- 2011–2013: Primeiro de Agosto
- 2014–: Interclube

Felizarda da Conceição Jorge (born 23 February 1985) is an Angolan basketball player. At the 2012 Summer Olympics, she competed for the Angola women's national basketball team in the women's event. She is 5 ft 8 inches tall.
