= Nadir Manuel =

Angolan basketball player (born 1986)

No. 12 – Interclube
- Position: Power forward
- League: Angolan League; Africa Club Champions Cup

Personal information
- Born: 30 November 1986 (age 39) Benguela, Angola
- Listed height: 1.87 m (6 ft 2 in)
- Listed weight: 79 kg (174 lb)

Career information
- Playing career: 2002–present

Career history
- 2002: Primeiro de Maio
- 2006: Petro do Huambo
- 2007–present: Interclube

Nadir Graciete de Fátima Manuel (born 30 November 1986) is an Angolan basketball player. At the 2012 Summer Olympics, she competed for the Angola women's national basketball team in the women's event. She is 6 ft 1 inches tall.
