= Astrida Vicente =

Angolan basketball player (born 1978)

No. 9 – Interclube
- Position: Shooting guard
- League: Angolan League; Africa Club Champions Cup

Personal information
- Born: 6 October 1978 (age 48) Luena, Angola
- Listed height: 177 cm (5 ft 10 in)
- Listed weight: 69 kg (152 lb)

Astrida Tumba Vicente (born 6 October 1978) is an Angolan basketball player. At the 2012 Summer Olympics, she competed for the Angola women's national basketball team in the women's event. She is 5 ft 8 inches tall.
