= List of C.R.D. Libolo basketball players =

This article lists the players of C.R.D. Libolo (basketball). Also named Benfica do Libolo between 2017 and 2018, this Angolan basketball club was established in 1942 was based in Libolo, Kwanza Sul province.

== 2011–2018 ==
C.R.D. / S.L. Benfica Libolo basketball players 2011–2018

| Nat | # | Name | A | P | H | W | Raúl Duarte | | L.M. | Norberto Alves | | | H.L. | R.D. |
| Nat | # | Name | A | P | H | W | 2011 | 2012 | 2013 | 2014 | 2015 | 2016 | 2017 | 2018 |
| Nat | # | Name | A | P | H | W | 2 | 2 | 1 | 2 | 1 | 2 | – | – |
|---|---|---|---|---|---|---|---|---|---|---|---|---|---|---|
| (Angola) | ⋅ | Abdel Bouckar | 34 | C | 2.02 | 109 | 2011 | 2012 | 12 | 12 | ⋅ | ⋅ | ⋅ | ⋅ |
| (Angola) | ⋅ | Abdel Gomes | 22 | ⋅ | 2.03 | | 2011 | ⋅ | ⋅ | ⋅ | ⋅ | ⋅ | ⋅ | ⋅ |
| (Angola) | ⋅ | Agostinho Coelho | 26 | SF | 1.98 | 90 | ⋅ | ⋅ | ⋅ | ⋅ | → | 11 | → | ⋅ |
| (United States) | 21 | Andre Harris | 32 | PF | 2.01 | 103 | ⋅ | ⋅ | ⋅ | ⋅ | ⋅ | → | 5 | 2018 |
| (Angola) | 10 | António Deográcio | 27 | PG | 1.92 | 90 | ⋅ | ⋅ | ⋅ | ⋅ | ⋅ | → | 10 | 2018 |
| (Angola) | ⋅ | António Monteiro | 25 | C | 2.03 | | ⋅ | 2012 | ⋅ | 10 | ⋅ | ⋅ | ⋅ | ⋅ |
| (Angola) | 17 | Benvindo Quimbamba | 24 | G | 1.98 | 90 | ⋅ | ⋅ | ⋅ | → | 17 | 17 | 17 | 2018 |
| (Angola) | ⋅ | Bráulio Morais | 26 | PG | 1.85 | 90 | ⋅ | ⋅ | ⋅ | 9 | 9 | 9 | → | ⋅ |
| (United States) | ⋅ | Byron Burnett | 30 | C | 2.05 | | ⋅ | 2012 | ⋅ | ⋅ | ⋅ | ⋅ | ⋅ | ⋅ |
| (Angola) | ⋅ | Carlos Morais | 31 | SG | 1.92 | 96 | ⋅ | ⋅ | → | 6 | 6 | 6 | → | ⋅ |
| (Angola) | ⋅ | Domingos Bonifácio | 29 | PG | 1.89 | 76 | 2011 | ⋅ | 28 | → | ⋅ | ⋅ | ⋅ | ⋅ |
| (Angola) | ⋅ | Edgar Chocolate | | ⋅ | | | 2011 | ⋅ | ⋅ | ⋅ | ⋅ | ⋅ | ⋅ | ⋅ |
| (Angola) | ⋅ | Edson Ferreira | 29 | G | 1.84 | | ⋅ | 2012 | ⋅ | 8 | ⋅ | ⋅ | ⋅ | ⋅ |
| (Angola) | ⋅ | Edson Hilukilwa | 22 | SF | | | ⋅ | 2012 | ⋅ | ⋅ | ⋅ | ⋅ | ⋅ | ⋅ |
| (Angola) | ⋅ | Edson Ndoniema | 22 | PF | 1.91 | | 2011 | 2012 | 7 | → | ⋅ | ⋅ | ⋅ | ⋅ |
| (Angola) | ⋅ | Eduardo Mingas | 38 | C | 1.98 | 106 | ⋅ | ⋅ | → | 15 | 15 | 15 | 15 | → |
| (Angola) | ⋅ | Elmer Félix | 28 | ⋅ | 1.80 | 80 | ⋅ | ⋅ | ⋅ | ⋅ | 7 | – | 8 | → |
| (United States) | ⋅ | Erik Coleman | 30 | PF | 2.00 | 109 | ⋅ | ⋅ | ⋅ | 34 | 13 | ⋅ | ⋅ | ⋅ |
| (Angola) | ⋅ | Ezequiel Silva | 27 | ⋅ | | | ⋅ | ⋅ | ⋅ | ⋅ | 10 | ⋅ | ⋅ | ⋅ |
| (Angola) | ⋅ | Feliciano Camacho | 30 | ⋅ | | | 2011 | ⋅ | ⋅ | ⋅ | ⋅ | ⋅ | ⋅ | ⋅ |
| (Angola) | ⋅ | Filipe Abraão | 36 | SF | 1.94 | 88 | ⋅ | ⋅ | ⋅ | 14 | 14 | ⋅ | ⋅ | ⋅ |
| (Angola) | 1 | Francisco Sousa | 36 | PG | 1.84 | | 2011 | 2012 | 1 | 1 | → | → | 2 | 2018 |
| (Angola) | ⋅ | Gerson Domingos | 21 | PG | 1.78 | – | ⋅ | ⋅ | ⋅ | ⋅ | ⋅ | → | 11 | ⋅ |
| (Angola) | 15 | Hermenegildo Mbunga | 33 | PF | 2.04 | 98 | ⋅ | ⋅ | ⋅ | ⋅ | ⋅ | ⋅ | → | 2018 |
| (Angola) | ⋅ | Idelfonso Kiteculo | | ⋅ | | | → | 2012 | ⋅ | ⋅ | ⋅ | ⋅ | ⋅ | ⋅ |
| (United States) | 23 | Je'Kel Foster | 35 | SG | 1.91 | 98 | ⋅ | ⋅ | ⋅ | ⋅ | ⋅ | → | 9 | 2018 |
| (United States) | ⋅ | Jonathan Wallace | 30 | G | 1.88 | 95 | ⋅ | ⋅ | ⋅ | ⋅ | ⋅ | 5 | ⋅ | ⋅ |
| (Angola) | ⋅ | Jorge Tati | 34 | SF | 1.95 | 107 | ⋅ | ⋅ | ⋅ | ⋅ | ⋅ | → | 14 | ⋅ |
| (Angola) | ⋅ | José Miguel | 29 | ⋅ | | | ⋅ | 2012 | ⋅ | 7 | ⋅ | ⋅ | ⋅ | ⋅ |
| (Angola) | ⋅ | José Salvador | | ⋅ | | | ⋅ | 2012 | ⋅ | ⋅ | ⋅ | ⋅ | ⋅ | ⋅ |
| (Angola) | 16 | Joseney Joaquim | 26 | PF | 2.00 | 80 | ⋅ | ⋅ | ⋅ | ⋅ | 16 | 16 | 16 | 2018 |
| (Angola) | ⋅ | Leonel Paulo | 25 | PF | 1.97 | 93 | 2011 | ⋅ | ⋅ | ⋅ | ⋅ | ⋅ | ⋅ | ⋅ |
| (Democratic Republic of the Congo) | ⋅ | Lifetu Selengue | 38 | C | 2.02 | | ⋅ | ⋅ | ⋅ | 44 | ⋅ | ⋅ | ⋅ | ⋅ |
| (Angola) | ⋅ | Luís Costa | 37 | SG | 1.95 | 93 | ⋅ | 2012 | 5 | 5 | 5 | ⋅ | ⋅ | ⋅ |
| (Angola) | 19 | Manda João | 25 | SF | 1.98 | 91 | ⋅ | ⋅ | ⋅ | → | 19 | 19 | 19 | 2018 |
| (Angola) | ⋅ | Manuel Mariano | | F | | | 2011 | ⋅ | ⋅ | ⋅ | ⋅ | ⋅ | ⋅ | ⋅ |
| (Angola) | ⋅ | Mayzer Alexandre | 29 | SG | 1.84 | | 2011 | 2012 | 9 | → | ⋅ | ⋅ | ⋅ | ⋅ |
| (Angola) | 20 | Milton Barros | 34 | PG | 1.85 | 85 | 2011 | ⋅ | ⋅ | → | 18 | 18 | 18 | 2018 |
| (Mali) | ⋅ | Mohamed Tangara | 28 | PG | 2.08 | 112 | ⋅ | 2012 | ⋅ | ⋅ | ⋅ | ⋅ | ⋅ | ⋅ |
| (The Gambia) | ⋅ | Moses Sonko | 32 | PF | 1.96 | 95 | ⋅ | ⋅ | ⋅ | 11 | 11 | ⋅ | ⋅ | ⋅ |
| (Angola) | ⋅ | Mutau Fonseca | 24 | C | 2.02 | | ⋅ | 2012 | 15 | ⋅ | ⋅ | ⋅ | ⋅ | ⋅ |
| (Angola) | 4 | Olímpio Cipriano | 36 | SF | 1.94 | 92 | 2011 | 2012 | 4 | 4 | 4 | 4 | 4 | 2018 |
| (Angola) | 47 | Pedro Bastos | 25 | SF | 1.91 | 87 | ⋅ | ⋅ | ⋅ | ⋅ | ⋅ | ⋅ | → | 2018 |
| (United States) | 8 | Reggie Moore | 37 | PF | 2.03 | 107 | 2011 | ⋅ | ⋅ | ⋅ | ⋅ | ⋅ | → | 2018 |
| (Angola) | 7 | Roberto Fortes | 34 | SF | 1.93 | 88 | ⋅ | ⋅ | 8 | ⋅ | → | 7 | 7 | 2018 |
| (United States) | ⋅ | Roderick Nealy | 36 | PF | 2.01 | 95 | ⋅ | ⋅ | ⋅ | ⋅ | → | 10 | → | ⋅ |
| (Brazil) | ⋅ | Sidnei Lima | 30 | C | 2.15 | | ⋅ | 2012 | 13 | ⋅ | ⋅ | ⋅ | ⋅ | ⋅ |
| (Angola) | ⋅ | Simão Santos | 29 | ⋅ | 1.98 | 91 | 2011 | ⋅ | ⋅ | ⋅ | ⋅ | ⋅ | ⋅ | ⋅ |
| (Angola) | 11 | Teotónio Dó | 24 | C | 2.06 | 110 | ⋅ | ⋅ | ⋅ | ⋅ | ⋅ | ⋅ | → | 2018 |
| (United States) | ⋅ | Tommie Eddie | 31 | PF | 2.01 | 120 | ⋅ | 2012 | 44 | ⋅ | ⋅ | ⋅ | ⋅ | ⋅ |
| (Angola) | ⋅ | Valdelício Joaquim | 27 | C | 2.08 | 109 | ⋅ | ⋅ | ⋅ | → | 12 | 12 | 12 | → |
| (Angola) | ⋅ | Vladimir Pontes | 32 | ⋅ | 1.90 | 83 | ⋅ | ⋅ | ⋅ | → | 8 | 8 | → | ⋅ |
| (Angola) | ⋅ | Vladimir Ricardino | 35 | PF | 1.98 | | → | 2012 | 10 | → | ⋅ | ⋅ | ⋅ | ⋅ |
| (Angola) | ⋅ | Zola Paulo | 28 | C | 2.02 | 125 | ⋅ | ⋅ | ⋅ | ⋅ | ⋅ | 13 | → | ⋅ |

== 2009–2010 ==
C.R.D. Libolo basketball players 2009–2010

| Nat | Name | A | P | H | W | – | Raúl Duarte | |
| Nat | Name | A | P | H | W | – | 2009 | 2010 |
| Nat | Name | A | P | H | W | – | 4 | 2 |
|---|---|---|---|---|---|---|---|---|
| (Angola) | Abdel Gomes | – | ⋅ | 2.03 | | ⋅ | 2009 | 2010 |
| (Angola) | Adilson Câmara | 28 | G | 1.82 | | ⋅ | 2009 | 2010 |
| (Angola) | Carlos Morais | – | SG | 1.92 | 96 | ⋅ | ⋅ | 2010 |
| (Angola) | Domingos Bonifácio | – | PG | 1.89 | 76 | ⋅ | 2009 | 2010 |
| (Angola) | Ezequiel Silva | – | ⋅ | | | ⋅ | 2009 | ⋅ |
| (Angola) | Feliciano Camacho | – | ⋅ | | | ⋅ | 2009 | 2010 |
| (Angola) | Gerson Monteiro | 37 | SF | 1.90 | 90 | ⋅ | 2009 | 2010 |
| (Angola) | Joaquim Xavier | 28 | SF | 1.94 | | ⋅ | 2009 | ⋅ |
| (Angola) | Jose Carvalho | | ⋅ | | | ⋅ | 2009 | ⋅ |
| (United States) | Joseph Toussaint | | ⋅ | | | ⋅ | 2009 | ⋅ |
| (Angola) | Leonel Paulo | – | PF | 1.97 | 93 | ⋅ | 2009 | 2010 |
| (Angola) | Luís Costa | – | SG | 1.95 | 93 | ⋅ | 2009 | 2010 |
| (Angola) | Manuel Mariano | – | F | | | ⋅ | 2009 | ⋅ |
| (Angola) | Milton Barros | – | PG | 1.85 | 85 | ⋅ | ⋅ | 2010 |
| (Angola) | Olímpio Cipriano | – | SF | 1.94 | 92 | ⋅ | ⋅ | 2010 |
| (United States) | Omar Peterkins | | C | | | ⋅ | ⋅ | 2010 |
| (United States) | Reggie Moore | – | PF | 2.03 | 107 | ⋅ | 2009 | 2010 |
| (Angola) | Silvio Lopes | | ⋅ | | | ⋅ | 2009 | 2010 |

== See also ==
- Category:C.R.D. Libolo basketball players
