= List of G.D. Interclube men's basketball players =

Grupo Desportivo Interclube is an Angolan basketball club from Luanda, Angola and plays their home games at Pavilhão 28 de Fevereiro in Luanda. The club was established in 1976.

== 2011–2018 ==
G.D. Interclube men's basketball players 2011–2018

Nat	#	Name	A	P	H	W	JCG	A.C.	Alberto Babo					
Nat	#	Name	A	P	H	W	2011	2012	2013	2014	2015	2016	2017	2018
Nat	#	Name	A	P	H	W	3rd	4th	4th	4th	5th	4th	–	–
(Angola)	12	Abdel Gomes	29	C	2.03	⋅	⋅	⋅	⋅	⋅	12	12	12	2018
(Angola)	⋅	Adilson Ramos	28	SF	1.79	⋅	⋅	2012	24	24	24	24	24	→
(Angola)	⋅	Afonso Kiala	⋅	SF	⋅	⋅	⋅	⋅	9	⋅	⋅	⋅	⋅	2018
(Angola)	22	Alexandre Jungo	21	⋅	2.02	⋅	⋅	⋅	⋅	⋅	→	10	22	2018
(Angola)	⋅	André Miguel	28	C	1.98	99	⋅	⋅	14	14	14	14	14	→
(Angola)	⋅	Candido Madureira	⋅	PF	⋅	⋅	⋅	⋅	⋅	13	⋅	⋅	⋅	⋅
(Angola)	⋅	Cristóvão Oliveira	32	⋅	⋅	⋅	⋅	⋅	13	15	⋅	⋅	⋅	⋅
(Angola)	16	Dilson Piedade	21	C	2.10	115	⋅	⋅	⋅	⋅	⋅	⋅	⋅	2018
(Angola)	⋅	Edmundo Ventura	38	PG	1.82	⋅	2011	2012	1	1	⋅	⋅	⋅	⋅
(Angola)	⋅	Eduardo Mingas	39	C	1.98	106	2011	2012	15	→	⋅	⋅	⋅	⋅
(Angola)	13	Egídio Ventura	28	SG	1.98	⋅	⋅	⋅	⋅	⋅	⋅	13	13	2018
(United States)	⋅	Elliah Clarke	⋅	⋅	⋅	⋅	⋅	⋅	6	6	⋅	⋅	⋅	⋅
(Portugal)	⋅	Elvis Évora	36	C	2.05	⋅	⋅	⋅	→	12	→	⋅	⋅	⋅
(Angola)	⋅	Emanuel António	25	PG	1.70	⋅	⋅	⋅	⋅	⋅	2	⋅	⋅	⋅
(Angola)	⋅	Eric Norman	30	SF	1.90	91	⋅	⋅	⋅	→	3	⋅	⋅	⋅
(Angola)	⋅	Euclides Camacho	31	⋅	⋅	⋅	2011	⋅	⋅	⋅	⋅	⋅	⋅	⋅
(Angola)	23	Fidel Cabita	25	C	2.06	⋅	⋅	⋅	⋅	→	16	16	23	2018
(Angola)	⋅	Francisco Horácio	37	PG	1.92	⋅	⋅	⋅	4	4	4	4	4	⋅
(Angola)	⋅	Francisco Machado	31	C	2.05	98	2011	2012	⋅	⋅	⋅	⋅	⋅	⋅
(Angola)	2	Gerson Domingos	22	PG	1.78	⋅	⋅	⋅	⋅	⋅	→	2	2	2018
(Angola)	14	Gilson Martins	26	⋅	2.00	⋅	⋅	⋅	⋅	⋅	⋅	⋅	⋅	2018
(Angola)	⋅	Goldafim Freitas	24	⋅	⋅	⋅	⋅	⋅	⋅	⋅	⋅	→	15	→
(Angola)	⋅	Hélder Cristina	26	C	1.95	⋅	⋅	⋅	⋅	⋅	→	3	⋅	⋅
(Angola)	⋅	Hélder Ortet	30	C	2.01	⋅	⋅	2012	⋅	⋅	⋅	⋅	⋅	⋅
(United States)	4	Henry Uhegwu	36	SF	1.91	81	⋅	⋅	7	⋅	⋅	⋅	⋅	2018
(Angola)	⋅	João Filho	22	C	2.02	⋅	⋅	⋅	⋅	23	⋅	⋅	⋅	⋅
(Angola)	⋅	Joaquim Xavier	33	SF	1.94	⋅	2011	2012	50	50	⋅	⋅	⋅	⋅
(Angola)	7	Jonatão Ndjungu	20	C	2.03	⋅	⋅	⋅	⋅	⋅	⋅	⋅	⋅	2018
(Angola)	⋅	Jorge Tati	32	SF	1.95	⋅	2011	2012	10	10	10	→	⋅	⋅
(Angola)	⋅	José António	26	SF	⋅	⋅	⋅	⋅	⋅	7	7	7	→	⋅
(Angola)	⋅	José Nascimento	33	PF	1.96	⋅	2011	⋅	⋅	⋅	⋅	⋅	⋅	⋅
(Angola)	3	José Salvador	28	⋅	⋅	⋅	⋅	⋅	⋅	⋅	⋅	→	3	2018
(United States)	⋅	Kevin Goffney	26	⋅	1.98	100	⋅	2012	⋅	⋅	⋅	⋅	⋅	⋅
(United States)	⋅	Kevin Foster	25	PF	1.88	96	⋅	⋅	⋅	⋅	13	⋅	⋅	⋅
(Democratic Republic of the Congo)	⋅	Lifetu Selengue	37	C	2.02	⋅	2011	2012	12	⋅	⋅	⋅	⋅	⋅
(Angola)	⋅	Luís Costa	33	SG	1.93	93	2011	⋅	⋅	⋅	⋅	⋅	⋅	⋅
(United States)	⋅	Matthew Shaw	26	PF	2.01	102	⋅	2012	⋅	⋅	⋅	⋅	⋅	⋅
(Angola)	⋅	Michel Santos	25	⋅	1.97	⋅	2011	⋅	⋅	⋅	⋅	⋅	⋅	⋅
(Angola)	11	Miguel Kiala	27	SG	2.04	⋅	⋅	⋅	⋅	→	11	11	11	⋅
(Angola)	⋅	Milton Barros	30	PG	1.83	⋅	⋅	2012	31	31	→	⋅	⋅	⋅
(Angola)	⋅	Mwamba Ilunga	30	PF	2.01	⋅	2011	2012	11	11	→	⋅	⋅	⋅
(Angola)	6	Ngombo Rogério	23	SF	2.02	⋅	⋅	⋅	⋅	⋅	⋅	6	6	2018
(Angola)	⋅	Osvaldo Vieira	30	SF	⋅	⋅	⋅	⋅	5	5	5	⋅	⋅	⋅
(Angola)	9	Paulo Barros	29	SG	1.95	⋅	⋅	⋅	→	9	9	9	9	2018
(Angola)	10	Paulo Santana	33	PG	1.82	84	⋅	⋅	⋅	⋅	⋅	→	10	2018
(Democratic Republic of the Congo)	15	Pitchou Manga	30	C	2.10	115	⋅	⋅	⋅	⋅	⋅	⋅	⋅	2018
(United States)	⋅	Quintrell Thomas	25	C	2.03	111	⋅	⋅	⋅	⋅	15	→	⋅	⋅
(United States)	⋅	Roderick Nealy	37	PF	2.01	95	⋅	⋅	23	→	⋅	→	16	⋅
(Angola)	⋅	Romenique Sambo	28	PG	⋅	⋅	⋅	⋅	⋅	→	8	8	→	⋅
(United States)	⋅	Shannon Crooks	38	PG	1.88	⋅	2011	⋅	⋅	⋅	⋅	⋅	⋅	⋅
(Angola)	⋅	Simão João	23	⋅	⋅	⋅	⋅	2012	⋅	⋅	⋅	⋅	⋅	⋅
(Angola)	⋅	Simão Panzo	34	PG	1.88	⋅	2011	⋅	⋅	⋅	⋅	⋅	⋅	⋅
(Angola)	⋅	Vasco Estevão	28	SF	⋅	⋅	⋅	⋅	–	⋅	⋅	⋅	⋅	⋅
(Angola)	⋅	Vladimir Pontes	30	SF	⋅	⋅	⋅	⋅	⋅	8	→	⋅	⋅	⋅
(Angola)	8	Walter Tadeu	28	PG	1.78	79	⋅	⋅	⋅	⋅	⋅	⋅	→	2018
(Angola)	⋅	Wilson da Mata	30	⋅	⋅	⋅	2011	⋅	⋅	⋅	⋅	⋅	⋅	⋅
(Angola)	⋅	Yubi Major	25	⋅	⋅	⋅	2011	2012	⋅	⋅	⋅	⋅	⋅	⋅

== See also ==
- Category:G.D. Interclube men's basketball players
