= 2014–15 BIC Basket =

BIC Basket 2014–15
- League: BIC Basket
- Sport: Basketball
- Duration: November 20, 2014 – June 16, 2015
- Teams: 10
- TV partner(s): TPA2 (Angola) TPA Internacional (Worldwide) Supersport (Africa)

BIC Basket season 2014–2015
- Champion: Petro de Luanda
- Season MVP: (Angola) Leonel Paulo

BAI Basket seasons
- ← 2013–14 2015–16 →

The 2014–15 BIC Basket (37th edition), Angola's top tier basketball club competition, ran from November 20, 2014 through June 16, 2015. It consisted of four stages plus the playoffs. At the initial stage (regular season) all ten teams played each other in a double round robin system. In stage 2 (group stage 1), the first six teams from the regular season played in a single round robin in each group. In stage 3 (group stage 2), the first five teams from group stage 1 played in a round robin in group A whereas the four teams in group B plus the relegated team from group A played round robin classification matches in group B. In stage 4 (semifinals), the first-seeded team played a best-of-five series with the fourth-seeded team whereas the 2nd-seeded team played the third-seeded team with the winners playing a best-of-seven series of matches for the title and the losers playing a best-of-three series for third place. The 5th-seeded team from group A joined group B to play the group's 3rd-seeded team also in a best-of-five series whereas 1st-seeded plays 2nd seeded. Winners of those group B matches played a best-of-seven series for seventh place, the losers played a best-of-three for ninth place whereas the last two teams in group B will be relegated to the 2nd division championship.

== BIC Basket Participants (2014–15 Season) ==
Promoted from 2nd Division

Team	Home
ASA	Luanda
Marinha	Luanda
Interclube	Luanda
Petro de Luanda	Luanda
Primeiro de Agosto	Luanda
Progresso	Luanda
Recreativo do Libolo	Luanda
Sporting de Benguela	Benguela
Universidade Lusíada	Luanda
F.C. Vila Clotilde	Luanda

== Regular season (November 20, 2014 - March 13, 2015) ==
	ASA	INT	MAR	PET	PRI	PRO	LIB	SCB	LUS	VIL	Rec.
ASA		81–94; 21 Nov (1)	– 13 Feb (16)	89–97; 6 Feb (14)	79–73; 13 Jan (2)	70–73; 14 Feb (17)	84–94; 3 Jan (9)	96–64; 6 Jan (4)	73–51; 7 Feb (15)	86–69; 20 Dec (3)	5–4
Interclube	71–57; 23 Jan (10)		– 14 Feb (17)	71–90; 12 Dec (4)	88–94; 5 Dec (6)	107–74; 6 Feb (14)	108–113; 6 Jan (7)	89–53; 17 Jan (12)	60–59; 21 Feb (19)	80–84; 6 Dec (9)	5–4
Marinha	– 12 Dec (7)	55–105; 28 Nov (8)		– 19 Dec (3)	47–112; 23 Jan (10)	– 17 Feb (11)	53–75; 13 Mar (19)	67–80; 6 Feb (14)	65–57; 20 Feb (18)	– 13 Dec (4)	2–7
Petro de Luanda	89–87; 6 Dec (5)	85–99; 31 Jan (13)	93–61; 30 Jan (12)		74–102; 6 Jan (7)	96–63; 20 Feb (18)	104–70; 24 Jan (11)	108–85; 29 Nov ()	100–73; 5 Dec (8)	112–94; 23 Jan (10)	7–2
Primeiro de Agosto	87–65; 24 Jan (11)	85–69; 7 Feb (15)	118–53; 29 Nov (1)	92–87; 13 Feb (16)		92–68; 6 Dec (3)	75–54; 31 Jan (13)	93–71; 22 Nov ()	69–59; 3 Jan (5)	91–63; 28 Nov (8)	9–0
Progresso	56–85; 29 Nov (8)	80–75; 20 Dec (5)	– 5 Dec (2)	54–83; 16 Dec (9)	35–108; 30 Jan (12)		78–105; 10 Feb (10)	76–81; 7 Feb (15)	50–68; 28 Nov (7)	84–88; 21 Feb (19)	2–7
Recreativo do Libolo	99–85; 20 Feb (18)	96–86; 13 Feb (16)	77–58; 13 Jan ()	91–100; 16 Jan (2)	84–104; 17 Jan (4)	87–50; 21 Nov (1)		112–88; 7 Mar (17)	92–56 ? (3)	121–79; 6 Feb (14)	7–2
Sporting de Benguela	102–94; 31 Jan (13)	76–81; 16 Jan (3)	– 6 Dec (5)	82–108; 28 Nov ()	76–104; 21 Nov ()	– 12 Dec (6)	80–89; 6 Mar (8)		– 24 Jan (11)	– (7)	5–4
Universidade Lusíada	– 16 Dec (6)	– 13 Dec ()	73–85; 20 Dec (9)	80–84; 14 Feb (17)	56–91; 6 Feb (14)	88–78; 13 Feb (16)	87–81; 30 Jan (12)	– ? (2)		73–86; 29 Nov (4)	3–6
Vila Clotilde	52–78; 30 Jan (12)	68–104; 20 Feb (18)	89–76; 31 Jan (13)	– 21 Nov (1)	64–116; 14 Feb (17)	74–80; 19 Dec ()	69–94; 20 Nov (5)	86–81; 13 Feb (16)	73–77; 27 Feb (13)		2–7
Record	4–5	6–3	1–8	8–1	8–1	3–6	6–3	2–7	2–7	3–6	

- Note: Numbers in brackets indicate round number

=== Regular season standings ===
Qualified for the Group A
Relegated to the Group B

Pos	Team	P	W	L	PF	PA	Diff	Pts
1	Primeiro de Agosto	18	17	1	1706	1192	+514	35
2	Petro de Luanda	18	15	3	1707	1404	+303	33
3	Recreativo do Libolo	18	13	5	1634	1444	+190	31
4	Interclube	18	11	7	1560	1378	+182	29
5	ASA	18	9	9	1411	1363	+48	27
6	Sporting de Benguela	18	7	11	1434	1559	-125	25
7	Universidade Lusíada	18	5	13	1230	1398	-168	23
8	Progresso	18	5	13	1166	1446	-280	23
9	Vila Clotilde	18	5	13	1344	1631	-287	23
10	Marinha	18	3	15	1062	1437	-375	21

== Regular season Awards ==
2015 BIC Basket MVP

- (Angola) Leonel Paulo (Petro de Luanda)

2015 BIC Basket Top Scorer

- (Angola) Leonel Paulo (Petro de Luanda)

2015 BIC Basket Top Rebounder

- (United States) Jason Cain (Petro de Luanda)

2015 BIC Basket Top Assistor

- (United States) Manny Quezada (Petro de Luanda)

== Group Stage 1 (March 20 - April 13, 2015) ==
=== Group A ===
	ASA	INT	PET	PRI	LIB	SCB	Rec.
ASA				66–79; 27 Mar (2)		– 10 Apr (4)	–
Interclube	93–77; 11 Apr (5)					85–72; 27 Mar (2)	–
Petro de Luanda	95–88; 20 Mar (1)	83–114; 10 Apr (4)			94–87; 26 Mar (2)		–
Primeiro de Agosto		85–79; 28 Mar (3)	119–116; 11 Apr (5)			90–75; 20 Mar (1)	–
Recreativo do Libolo	97–92; 28 Mar (3)	87–74; 20 Mar (1)		97–92; 10 Apr (4)			–
Sporting de Benguela			81–99; 7 Apr (3)		61–83; 13 Apr (5)		–
Record	–	–	–	–	–	–	

=== Group B ===
	MAR	PRO	LUS	VIL	Rec.
Marinha				78–68; 27 Mar (2)	–
Progresso	72–64; 21 Mar (1)				–
Un.Lusíada	71–82; 10 Apr (3)	72–82; 27 Mar (2)			–
Vila Clotilde		76–70; 11 Apr (3)	75–83; 20 Mar (1)		–
Record	–	–	–	–	

- Note: Numbers in (brackets) indicate round number

Pos	Team	P	W	L	PF	PA	Diff	Pts
1	Primeiro de Agosto *	5	4	1	472	433	+39	10
3	Recreativo do Libolo	5	4	1	450	416	+34	9
2	Petro de Luanda	5	3	2	487	489	-2	8
4	Interclube	5	3	2	445	404	+41	8
5	ASA	5	1	4	419	427	-8	6
6	Sporting de Benguela **	5	0	5	353	457	-104	5

- Awarded a bonus point for finishing first in regular season
  ** Relegated to group B

Pos	Team	P	W	L	PF	PA	Diff	Pts
1	Progresso	3	2	1	224	201	+23	5
2	Marinha	3	2	1	224	220	+4	5
3	Lusíada	3	1	2	226	239	-13	4
4	Vila Clotilde	3	1	2	219	233	-14	4

== Group Stage 2 (April 24 - May 10, 2015) ==
=== Group A ===
	ASA	INT	PET	PRI	LIB	Rec.
ASA		84–60; 30 Apr (3)		78–98; 5 May (4)		1–1
Interclube			80–100; 24 Apr (1)	77–79; 8 May (5)		0–2
Petro de Luanda	99–87; 08 May (5)				96–92; 2 May (4)	2–0
Primeiro de Agosto			80–85; 25 Apr (2)		86–82; 30 Apr (3)	1–1
Recreativo do Libolo	101–75; 24 Apr (1)	79–78; 25 Apr (2)				2–0
Record	0–2	0–2	2–0	2–0	0–2	

=== Group B ===
	MAR	PRO	SCB	LUS	VIL	Rec.
Marinha			– 10 May (5)	45–69; 24 Apr (1)		–
Progresso	65–68; 25 Apr (2)				70–71; 24 Apr (1)	–
Sporting de Benguela		86–44; 30 Apr (3)		84–68; 25 Apr (2)		–
Un.Lusíada		– 2 May (4)			79–86; 8 May (5)	–
Vila Clotilde	82–74; 30 Apr (3)		– 9 May (4)			–
Record	–	–	–	–	–	

Pos	Team	P	W	L	PF	PA	Diff	Pts
1	Petro de Luanda	4	4	0	380	339	+41	8
2	Primeiro de Agosto	4	3	1	343	322	+21	7
3	Recreativo do Libolo	4	4	1	354	335	+19	6
4	ASA	4	1	4	324	358	-34	5
5	Interclube *	4	0	4	295	342	-47	4

- Relegated to group B

Pos	Team	P	W	L	PF	PA	Diff	Pts
1	Sporting de Benguela	3	2	1	154	136	+18	5
2	Progresso	3	2	1	154	136	+18	5
3	Lusíada	3	1	2	155	157	-2	5
4	Marinha	3	2	1	142	140	+2	4
5	Vila Clotilde	3	1	2	143	161	-18	4

== Semifinals (May 19–28, 2015) ==
=== Petro Atlético vs ASA ===
19 May 2015
18:00 WAT

Petro Atlético	88–75	ASA
Scoring by quarter: 19-21, 23-23, 21-17, 25-14
Pts: Quezada 30		Pts: Ventura 26
1–0

Pavilhão da Cidadela, Luanda

21 May 2015
18:00 WAT

Petro Atlético	105–66	ASA
Scoring by quarter: 25-30, 32-16, 30-8, 18-12
Pts: Leonel 20		Pts: Mayzer 20
2–0

Pavilhão da Cidadela, Luanda

22 May 2015
18:00 WAT

ASA	63–98	Petro Atlético
3–0

Pavilhão Anexo, Luanda

=== 1º de Agosto vs Rec do Libolo ===
19 May 2015
18:00 WAT

1º de Agosto	84–86	Rec do Libolo
Scoring by quarter: 19-19, 17-23, 21-17, 27-27
Pts: Nealy 23; Rebs: Kikas 10		Pts: Mingas 19; Rebs: Vander 8
0–1

Pavilhão Victorino Cunha, Luanda

21 May 2015
19:00 WAT

1º de Agosto	84–87	Rec do Libolo
Scoring by quarter: 14-17, 25-19, 18-26, 27-25
Pts: Nealy 30; Rebs: Miller 10; Asts: Ndoniema 3		Pts: Vander 20; Rebs: Vander 8 Asts: Morais 5
0–2

Pavilhão Victorino Cunha, Luanda

23 May 2015
18:00 WAT

Rec do Libolo	88–77	1º de Agosto
3–0

Pavilhão do Dreamspace, Luanda

== Finals (June 2–16, 2015) ==
=== Petro Atlético vs Rec Libolo ===
2 Jun 2015
18:00 WAT

Petro Atlético	100–95	Rec do Libolo
Scoring by quarter: 27-23, 24-25, 27-21, 22-26
Pts: Fortes 23; Rebs: Cain 16; Asts: Leonel 5		Pts: Olímpio 21; Rebs: Mingas 8 Asts: Mingas 5
1–0

Pavilhão da Cidadela, Luanda
Referees: Fernando Pacheco, David Manuel, Mbunga Pedro

4 Jun 2015
18:00 WAT

Petro Atlético	95–100	Rec do Libolo
Scoring by quarter: 23-29, 24-27, 25-21, 23-23
Pts: Cain 22; Rebs: Cain 11; Asts: Bastos 2		Pts: Bráulio 20; Rebs: Coleman 7 Asts: C.Morais 6
1–1

Pavilhão da Cidadela, Luanda
Referees: Francisco Pacheco, António Bernardo, Clésio Francisco

6 Jun 2015
18:00 WAT

Rec do Libolo	99–81	Petro Atlético
Scoring by quarter: 31-20, 18-27, 27-14, 23-20
Pts: C.Morais 28; Rebs: Vander 10		Pts: Quezada 22; Rebs: Cain 8
2–1

Pavilhão Dreamspace, Luanda
Referees: Fernando Pacheco, Carlos Júlio, Paulo Luvati

9 Jun 2015
18:00 WAT

Rec do Libolo	89–90	Petro Atlético
Scoring by quarter: 18-24, 29-18, 21-21, 21-27
Pts: C.Morais 24; Rebs: Costa 8 Asts: Morais 8		Pts: Quezada 21; Rebs: Leonel 8 Asts: Quezada 6
2–2

Pavilhão Dreamspace, Luanda
Referees: Fernando Pacheco, David Manuel, Mbunga Pedro

11 Jun 2015
18:00 WAT

Petro Atlético	77–78	Rec do Libolo
Scoring by quarter: 19-22, 17-15, 24-15, 17-26
Pts: Quezada 31; Rebs: Cain 11; Asts: Bonifácio 2		Pts: Mingas 24; Rebs: Olímpio 9 Asts: Olímpio 4
2–3

Pavilhão da Cidadela, Luanda

13 Jun 2015
18:00 WAT

Rec do Libolo	88–97	Petro Atlético
Scoring by quarter: 25-21, 26-21, 11-27, 26-28
Pts: C.Morais 31; Rebs: Mingas, Coleman 8 Asts: C.Morais 5		Pts: Quezada 25; Rebs: Leonel 10; Asts: Quezada 7
3–3

Pavilhão Dreamspace, Luanda
Referees: Carlos Júlio, António Bernardo, David Manuel

16 Jun 2015
18:00 WAT

Petro Atlético	90–84	Rec do Libolo
Scoring by quarter: 24-23, 15-13, 21-25, 30-23
Pts: Quezada 34; Rebs: Cain 15		Pts: C.Morais 24; Rebs: Mingas 12; Asts: Elmer 6

Pavilhão da Cidadela, Luanda
Referees: Fernando Pacheco, Carlos Júlio, David Manuel

== Finals Awards ==
2015 BIC Basket Finals MVP

- (United States) Manny Quezada (Petro de Luanda)

2015 BIC Basket Finals Top Scorer

- (United States) Manny Quezada (Petro de Luanda)

2015 BIC Basket Finals Top Rebounder

- (United States) Jason Cain (Petro de Luanda)

2015 BIC Basket Finals Top Assistor

- (United States) Manny Quezada (Petro de Luanda)

2015 Bic Basket
Atlético Petróleos de Luanda
12th title

Most Valuable Player
(Angola) Leonel Paulo

== See also ==
- BIC Basket
- 2014 2nd Division Basketball
- BAI Basket Past Seasons
- Federação Angolana de Basquetebol
