= 2015–16 BIC Basket =

BIC Basket 2015–16
- League: BIC Basket
- Sport: Basketball
- Duration: January 8, 2016 – June, 2016
- Teams: 10
- TV partner(s): TPA2 (Angola); TPA Internacional

BIC Basket season 2015–2016
- Champion: 1º de Agosto
- Season MVP: Gildo Santos

BAI Basket seasons
- ← 2014–15 2016–17 →

The 2015–16 BIC Basket (38th edition), Angola's top tier basketball club competition, will run from January 8, 2016, through June, 2016. It consists of four stages plus the playoffs. At the initial stage (regular season) all ten teams played each other in a double round robin system. In stage 2 (group stage 1), the first six teams from the regular season played in a single round robin in each group. In stage 3 (group stage 2), the first five teams from group stage 1 played in a round robin in group A whereas the four teams in group B plus the relegated team from group A played round robin classification matches in group B. In stage 4 (semifinals), the first-seeded team played a best-of-five series with the fourth-seeded team whereas the 2nd-seeded team played the third-seeded team with the winners playing a best-of-seven series of matches for the title and the losers playing a best-of-three series for third place. The 5th-seeded team from group A joined group B to play the group's 3rd-seeded team also in a best-of-five series whereas 1st-seeded plays 2nd seeded. Winners of those group B matches played a best-of-seven series for seventh place, the losers played a best-of-three for ninth place whereas the last two teams in group B will be relegated to the 2nd division championship.

== BIC Basket Participants (2015–16 Season) ==
Promoted from 2nd Division

Team	Home
ASA	Luanda
Marinha	Luanda
Interclube	Luanda
Petro de Luanda	Luanda
Primeiro de Agosto	Luanda
Progresso	Luanda
Recreativo do Libolo	Luanda
Sporting de Benguela	Benguela
Universidade Lusíada	Luanda
F.C. Vila Clotilde	Luanda

== Regular Season (November 20, 2015 - March 13, 2016) ==
	ASA	INT	MAR	PET	PRI	PRO	LIB	SCB	LUS	VIL	Rec.
ASA		62–75; 5 Mar 8(2)	56–69; 16 Jan 4(1)	67–89; 22 Jan 5(1)	63–82; 15 Jan 3(1)	51–50; 11 Mar 9(2)	63–80; 9 Jan 2(1)	91–87; 27 Feb 6(2)	72–71; 4 Mar 7(2)	75–69; 10 Feb 1(2)	4–5
Interclube	70–62; 30 Jan 8(1)		69–54; 13 Feb 2(2)	91–101; 19 Feb 3(2)	79–87; 8 Jan 1(1)	103–80; 29 Jan 7(1)	72–80; 5 Feb 9(1)	91–89; 20 Feb 4(2)	75–62; 26 Feb 5(2)	117–71; 23 Jan 6(1)	6–3
Marinha	72–67; 20 Feb 4(2)	80–88; 9 Jan 2(1)		72–80; 30 Jan 8(1)	64–81; 27 Feb 6(2)	91–62; 19 Feb 3(2)	71–89; 26 Feb 5(2)	68–56; 4 Mar 9(2)	49–34; 8 Jan 1(1)	62–55; 6 Feb 7(2)	5–4
Petro de Luanda	107–86; 26 Feb 5(2)	101–91; 12 Mar 3(1)	118–81; 20 Mar 8(2)		85–75; 4 Mar 7(2)	109–63; 16 Jan 4(1)	85–98; 27 Feb 6(2)	86–82; 5 Mar 1(1)	81–68; 9 Jan 2(1)	108–83; 11 Mar 9(2)	8–1
Primeiro de Agosto	93–65; 19 Feb 3(2)	97–91; 12 Feb 1(2)	98–57; 23 Jan 6(1)	83–82; 29 Jan 7(1)		127–68; 9 Jan 2(1)	88–61; 20 Feb 4(2)	87–61; 7 Feb 8(2)	75–50; 30 Jan 9(1)	115–45; 22 Jan 5(1)	9–0
Progresso	60–78; 5 Feb 9(1)	59–77; 4 Mar 7(2)	76–96; 15 Jan 3(1)	78–108; 20 Feb 4(2)	50–85; 13 Feb 2(2)		85–134; 8 Jan 1(1)	59–76; 26 Feb 5(2)	65–84; 27 Feb 6(2)	0–20; 30 Jan 8(1)	0–9
Recreativo do Libolo	100–78; 13 Feb 2(2)	89–76; 11 Mar 9(2)	78–71; 22 Jan 5(1)	103–94; 23 Jan 6(1)	84–95; 16 Jan 4(1)	113–72; 12 Feb 1(2)		108–68; 29 Jan 7(1)	88–74; 5 Mar 8(2)	98–80; 15 Jan 3(1)	8–1
Sporting de Benguela	71–95; 24 Jan 6(1)	76–99; 15 Jan 4(1)	80–77; 11 Mar 9(2)	83–95; 12 Feb 1(2)	47–94; 6 Feb 8(1)	133–71; 21 Jan 5(1)	76–96; 13 Mar 7(2)		20–0; 3(1)	84–72; 13 Feb 2(2)	5–4
Universidade Lusíada	65–67; 29 Jan 7(1)	54–95; 22 Jan 5(1)	54–55; 12 Feb 1(2)	67–88; 13 Feb 2(2)	44–89; 11 Mar 9(2)	82–66; 23 Jan 6(1)	83–111; 6 Feb 8(1)	78–83; 19 Feb 3(2)		95–64; 20 Feb 4(2)	2–7
Vila Clotilde	101–82; 8 Jan 1(1)	69–106; 27 Feb 6(2)	52–84; 29 Jan 7(1)	79–103; 5 Feb 9(1)	74–82; 26 Feb 5(2)	76–64; 5 Mar 8(2)	93–123; 19 Feb 3(2)	65–86; 9 Jan 2(1)	77–72; 16 Jan 4(1)		3–6
Record	3–6	6–3	4–5	7–2	8–1	0–9	7–2	3–6	1–8	1–8	

- Note: Numbers in brackets indicate round number and leg

=== Regular season standings ===
Updated as of 3 March 2016

Pos	Team	M	W	L	PF	PA	D	Pts
1	Primeiro de Agosto	18	17	1	1633	1170	+463	35
2	Recreativo do Libolo	18	16	2	1733	1424	+309	34
3	Petro de Luanda	18	14	4	1718	1459	+259	32
4	Interclube	18	13	5	1574	1371	+203	31
5	Marinha	18	9	9	1273	1293	-20	27
6	ASA	18	7	11	1276	1415	-139	25
7	Sporting de Benguela	18	7	11	1362	1428	-66	25
8	Vila Clotilde	18	4	14	1245	1556	-311	22
9	Universidade Lusíada *	18	3	15	1137	1320	-183	20
10	Progresso *	18	0	18	1128	1643	-515	17

- 1 loss by default (no point awarded)

== Group stage 1 (March 25, 2016 - April 20, 2016) ==
Times given below are in WAT UTC+1.

=== Group A ===
25/26 Mar, 2016
ASA	60 : 67	1º de Agosto
Rec do Libolo	104 : 82	Marinha
Petro Atlético	104 : 82	Interclube
01 Apr, 2016
Interclube	76 : 84	ASA
1º de Agosto	96 : 78	Marinha
Rec do Libolo	82 : 71	Petro Atlético
02 Apr, 2016
Marinha	82 : 91	Petro Atlético
Interclube	79 : 103	1º de Agosto
ASA	72 : 78	Rec do Libolo
08/09 Apr, 2016
1º de Agosto	97 : 77	Petro Atlético
Marinha	94 : 89	ASA
Rec do Libolo	116 : 103	Interclube
15/16 Apr, 2016
Interclube	85 : 39	Marinha
1º de Agosto	103 : 105	Rec do Libolo
Petro Atlético	91 : 60	ASA

Pos	Team	Pld	W	L	GF	GA	GDIF	Pts
1	Rec do Libolo	5	5	0	485	431	+54	10
2	1º de Agosto	5	4	1	466	399	+67	10
3	Petro Atlético	5	3	2	415	397	+18	8
4	Interclube	5	1	4	419	427	-8	6
5	ASA	5	1	4	365	406	-41	6
6	Marinha	5	1	4	375	465	-90	6

- Note: Primeiro de Agosto was awarded a bonus point for finishing first in regular season
  Advance to next stage
  Relegated to Group B

=== Group B ===
26 Mar, 2016
Univ Lusíada	87 : 66	Progresso
Sp Benguela	77 : 87	Vila Clotilde
08/09 Apr, 2016
Vila Clotilde	99 : 94	Progresso
Sp Benguela	85 : 82	Univ Lusíada
20 Apr, 2016
Vila Clotilde	:	Univ Lusíada
Progresso	:	Sp Benguela

Pos	Team	Pld	W	L	GF	GA	GDIF	Pts
1	Vila Clotilde	2	2	0	186	171	+15	4
2	Sp Benguela	2	1	1	162	169	-7	3
3	Univ Lusíada	2	1	1	169	151	+18	3
4	Progresso	2	0	2	160	186	-26	2

== Group stage 2 (April 29, 2016 – May 10, 2016) ==
Times given below are in WAT UTC+1.

=== Group A ===
29 April 2016
Petro Atlético	112 : 109	Interclube
1º de Agosto	62 : 42	ASA
30 April 2016
1º de Agosto	87 : 94	Petro Atlético
Rec do Libolo	99 : 91	Interclube
6 May 2016
Rec do Libolo	115 : 104	1º de Agosto
Petro Atlético	120 : 63	ASA
7 May 2016
ASA	63 : 97	Rec do Libolo
1º de Agosto	80 : 87	Interclube
10 May 2016
Interclube	88 : 53	ASA
Rec do Libolo	87 : 96	Petro Atlético

Pos	Team	Pld	W	L	GF	GA	GDIF	Pts
1	Petro Atlético	4	4	0	422	346	+76	8
2	Rec do Libolo	4	3	1	398	354	+44	8
4	Interclube	4	2	2	375	344	+31	6
3	1º de Agosto	4	1	3	333	338	-5	5
5	ASA	4	0	4	221	367	-146	4

- Note: Recreativo do Libolo was awarded a bonus point for finishing first in Group stage 1
  Advance to semi-finals
  Relegated to Group B

=== Group B ===
29 Apr, 2016
Marinha	75 : 64	Univ Lusíada
Vila Clotilde	:	Progresso
30 Apr, 2016
Univ Lusíada	:	Progresso
Vila Clotilde	:	Sp Benguela
6 May 2016
Marinha	:	Sp Benguela
Univ Lusíada	:	Vila Clotilde
7 May 2016
Marinha	74 : 65	Vila Clotilde
Sp Benguela	:	Progresso
10 May 2016
Progresso	67 : 86	Marinha
Univ Lusíada	:	Sp Benguela

Pos	Team	Pld	W	L	GF	GA	GDIF	Pts
1	Marinha	4	4	0	274	207	+67	8
2	Vila Clotilde	4	3	1	249	218	+31	7
3	Progresso	4	1	3	210	234	-24	5
4	Univ Lusíada	3	1	2	209	223	-14	4
5	Sp Benguela	DNS						

== Semi-finals (May 14–24, 2016) ==
=== Petro Atlético vs 1º de Agosto ===
14 May 2016
18:00 WAT UTC+1

portuguese

Petro Atlético	75–102	1º de Agosto
Scoring by quarter: 12-23, 22-17, 22-24, 19-38
Pts: Moore 20; Rebs: Cain 7 Asts: Quezada 5		Pts: Isom 24; Rebs: Miller 7 Asts: Armando 4
0–1

Cidadela, Luanda

17 May 2016
19:00 WAT UTC+1

Petro Atlético	113–107	1º de Agosto
Scoring by quarter: 35-28, 14-20, 33-27, 31-32
Pts: Quezada 32; Rebs: Cain 8 Asts: Quezada 6		Pts: Gildo 21; Rebs: Miller 12; Asts: Armando 5
1–1

Cidadela, Luanda
Referees: Clésio Francisco, Mendonça Manuel, Mimy Sango

19 May 2016
19:00 WAT UTC+1

1º de Agosto	86–96	Petro Atlético
Scoring by quarter: 24-22, 12-30, 32-20, 18-24
Pts: Kirksay 21; Rebs: Miller 10; Asts: Isom 4		Pts: Quezada 30; Rebs: Cain 13; Asts: Quezada 3
1–2

Victorino Cunha, Luanda

21 May 2016
18:00 WAT UTC+1

1º de Agosto	108–82	Petro Atlético
Scoring by quarter: 19-23, 29-29, 35-7, 25-23
Pts: Isom, Ndoniema 17; Rebs: Miller 15		Pts: Cain 23; Rebs: Cain 12
2–2

Victorino Cunha, Luanda

24 May 2016
19:00 WAT UTC+1

Petro Atlético	114–116 (OT)	1º de Agosto
Scoring by quarter: 20-27, 29-27, 18-20, 28-21, Overtime: 12-12; 7-9
Pts: Quezada 37; Rebs: Cain 12; Asts: Quezada 10		Pts: Gildo, Kirksay 24; Rebs: Islando 10; Asts: Gildo 5
2–3

Cidadela, Luanda

=== Rec do Libolo vs Interclube ===
14 May 2016
19:00 WAT UTC+1

portuguese

Rec do Libolo	113–95	Interclube
Scoring by quarter: 27-21, 27-20, 31-22, 28-32
Pts: Nealy 27; Rebs: Nealy, Mingas 7 Asts: C.Morais 7		Pts: Thomas 16; Rebs: Thomas 12; Asts: Gerson 6
1–0

Dreamspace, Luanda
Referees: Clésio Francisco, Ruben Dungula, Miguel Sango

17 May 2016
19:00 WAT UTC+1

Rec do Libolo	96–88	Interclube
Scoring by quarter: 21-20, 20-20, 24-23, 31-25
Pts: Olímpio 36		Pts: P. Barros 22
2–0

Dreamspace, Luanda
Referees: Gilberto António, Ruben Dungula, Venâncio Suana

19 May 2016
19:00 WAT UTC+1

Interclube	77–98	Rec do Libolo
Scoring by quarter: 25-19, 16-20, 12-25, 24-34
Pts: Thomas 20; Rebs: Thomas 12; Asts: Thomas, Ventura 3		Pts: C.Morais, Wallace 23; Rebs: Mingas 12; Asts: Mingas 5
3–0

28 de Fevereiro, Luanda

== Third place ==
27 May 2016
18:00 WAT UTC+1

portuguese

Interclube	78–82	Petro Atlético
Scoring by quarter: 25-17, 20-22, 17-20, 16-23
Pts: P. Barros 21		Pts: Lukeni 29
0–1

28 de Fevereiro, Luanda
Referees: Gerson Calufele, Ruben Dungula, Miguel Sango

1 Jun 2016
19:00 WAT UTC+1

Petro Atlético	96–85	Interclube
Scoring by quarter: 27-28, 23-12, 20-26, 26-19
Pts: Cain 26; Rebs: Cain 13; Asts: Lukeni 7		Pts: P. Barros 23; Rebs: P. Barros, Thomas 7 Asts: Gerson 3
2–0

Anexo II, Luanda

== Finals (May 28–June 7, 2016) ==
28 May 2016
19:00 WAT UTC+1

1º de Agosto	113–83	Rec do Libolo
Scoring by quarter: 29-20, 28-22, 33-20, 23-21
Pts: Islando 29; Rebs: Miller 11		Pts: C.Morais 16; Rebs: Vander 7
1–0

Victorino Cunha, Luanda

31 May 2016
19:00 WAT UTC+1

portuguese

1º de Agosto	82–70	Rec do Libolo
Scoring by quarter: 17-18, 19-22, 18-14, 28-16
Pts: Kirksay 17; Rebs: Miller 9 Asts: Gildo 6		Pts: C.Morais 24; Rebs: Vander, Mingas 7 Asts: C.Morais 6
2–0

Victorino Cunha, Luanda

2 Jun 2016
19:00 WAT UTC+1

Rec do Libolo	91–89	1º de Agosto
Scoring by quarter: 24-19, 21-18, 18-23, 28-29
Pts: Olímpio 19; Rebs: Mingas 13; Asts: Milton 4		Pts: Kirksay 20; Rebs: Islando 13; Asts: Kirksay 6
1–2

Dreamspace, Luanda

4 Jun 2016
19:00 WAT UTC+1

Rec do Libolo	72–86	1º de Agosto
Scoring by quarter: 21-25, 23-14, 13-20, 15-27
Pts: C.Morais, Wallace 13; Rebs: Vander 9		Pts: Gildo 27; Rebs: Kirksay 7
1–3

Dreamspace, Luanda

7 Jun 2016
19:00 WAT UTC+1

1º de Agosto	93–83	Rec do Libolo
Scoring by quarter: 28-16, 17-19, 24-26, 24-22
Pts: Gildo 23; Rebs: Miller, Islando 9 Asts: Gildo 5		Pts: C.Morais 20; Rebs: Mingas 9 Asts: Mingas 4
4–1

Victorino Cunha, Luanda

== Awards ==
MVP

- (Angola) Gildo Santos (1º de Agosto)

Top Scorer

- (Angola) Carlos Morais (Rec do Libolo)

Top Rebounder

- (United States) Jason Cain (Petro de Luanda)

Top Assistor

- (Angola) Gerson Domingos (Interclube)

2016 BIC Basket winner

Clube Desportivo Primeiro de Agosto
18th title

Team roster: Armando Costa, Cedric Isom, Edson Ndoniema, Felizardo Ambrósio, Francisco Sousa, Gildo Santos, Islando Manuel, Joaquim Gomes, Jorge Tati, Mutu Fonseca, Tariq Kirksay, Tárcio Domingos
Head coach: Ricard Casas

Most Valuable Player
(Angola) Gildo Santos

== See also ==
- BIC Basket
- 2015 2nd Division Basketball
- BAI Basket Past Seasons
- Federação Angolana de Basquetebol
