= Angola Second Division Basketball Championship =

Basketball championship

Angola Second Division Basketball League
- Sport: Basketball
- Founded: 2013
- No. of teams: 8
- Country: Angola
- Continent: FIBA Africa (Africa)
- Most recent champion: Progresso do Sambizanga (2nd title) (2016)
- Most titles: Progresso do Sambizanga (2 titles)

The Angolan Second Division Basketball Championship Campeonato Nacional de Basquetebol da Segunda Divisão, was the second tier men's basketball league in Angola. The competition, organised by the Angolan Basketball Federation (FAB) and meant to be played on an annual basis, began in 2013.

== History ==
The first edition took place at the Pavilhão do Benfica do Lubango, in Lubango with Sporting Clube de Benguela crowned champion, after beating Amigos de Viana 107–76 in the final.

As of 2022, the second division is inactive, although the Angolan Federation is considering re-starting the league.

== Angola 2nd Division Basketball finals ==
Edition	Season	Champion	Score	Runner-up	Champion Coach
1	2013	Sporting de Benguela	107–76	Amigos de Viana	(Angola) Emanuel Trovoada
2	2014	Progresso do Sambizanga	97–58	CPPL	(Angola) Cláudio Dikini
3	2015	Sporting do Bié			
4	2016	Progresso do Sambizanga (2)			
5					
6	2018	G.D.R. Crisgunza			

== Angola 2nd Division Basketball Championship stats leaders ==
Season	MVP	Top Scorer	Rebounds
2013	(Angola) António Deográcio (SCB)	(Angola) Valdemar Martins (VIA) 22.1	(Angola) Josemar Carvalho (SCB)

== Angola 2nd Division Rankings ==
Club	2013	2014	Years	Gold medal	Silver medal	Bronze medal
Amigos de Viana	2013		1	0	1	0
CPPL	2013	2014	2	0	0	
Desportivo da Huíla	4		1	0	0	0
Heja SC	5		1	0	0	0
Marinha de Guerra		2014	1	0	0	0
Misto da Huíla	7		1	0	0	0
Misto do Bié	6		1	0	0	0
Primeiro de Maio	8		1	0	0	0
Progresso do Sambizanga		2014	1	0	0	0
Sporting de Benguela	2013		1	1	0	0
Sporting do Bié		4	1	1	0	0
# Teams	8	4				

== See also ==
- BAI Basket
- Angola Cup
- Angola Super Cup
- Federação Angolana de Basquetebol
