= Hermenegildo Santos =

Angolan basketball player (born 1990)

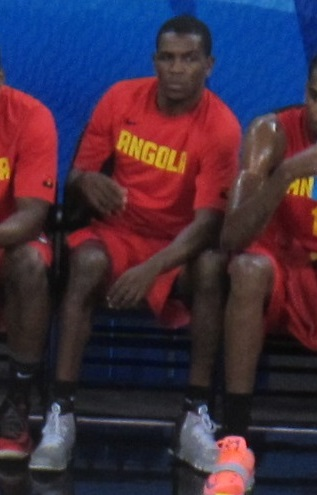
- Santos in 2014

No. 16 – Interclube
- Position: Point guard
- League: Angolan Basketball League

Personal information
- Born: August 16, 1990 (age 36) Luanda, Angola
- Listed height: 189 cm (6.20 ft)

Career history
- 2008–2017: Primeiro de Agosto
- 2017–2018: Libolo
- 2019–2023: Primeiro de Agosto
- 2023–present: Interclube
Medals
Men's basketball
Representing Angola
AfroBasket
Gold medal – first place	Abidjan 2013	National Team
Silver medal – second place	Radès 2015	National Team
AfroCan
Bronze medal – third place	Mali 2019
African Games
Gold medal – first place	Brazzaville 2015	National Team
FIBA Africa Under-18 Championship
Silver medal – second place	Alexandria 2008	National Team
FIBA Africa Clubs Champions Cup
Gold medal – first place	Malabo 2012	1º de Agosto
Gold medal – first place	Sousse 2013	1º de Agosto
Silver medal – second place	Salé 2011	1º de Agosto

Hermenegildo Chico dos Santos, also known as Gildo Santos, (born August 16, 1990), is an Angolan professional basketball player. Santos, who stands at 189 cm (6 ft 2 in), plays as a point guard.

== Professional career ==
From 2008 to 2017, and from 2019 to 2023, he competed for Primeiro de Agosto at the Angolan basketball league BAI Basket and the Africa Champions Cup. In the 2023 offseason, Santos transferred to Interclube, as Primeiro de Agosto was facing a financial crisis.

== National team career ==
Gildo Santos competed for Angola at the 2013 Afrobasket preliminary Angolan squad. Gildo was elected MVP of the 2016 Angolan league
