= 2013 Angola Second Division Basketball Championship =

Tournament details
- Host country: Angola
- Dates: November 16 – 23
- Teams: 8
- Venue(s): 1 (in 1 host city)

Final positions
- Champions: Angola (Sporting de Benguela's 1st titleth title)

Tournament statistics
- MVP: (Angola) António Deográcio
- Top scorer: (Angola) Valdemar Martins 22.1
- Top rebounds: (Angola) Josemar de Carvalho

The 2013 Angola 2nd Division Basketball Championship (1st edition), was a basketball tournament held in Lubango, Angola, from November 16 to 23, 2013. The tournament, organized by the Angolan Basketball Federation, qualified the two top teams for the 2013–14 BAI Basket and was contested by 8 clubs split into 2 groups, that played in a round robin system followed by the knock-out stages (quarter, semis and final).

The tournament was won by Sporting Clube de Benguela.

== Draw ==
Group A	Group B
Amigos de Viana; Desportivo da Huíla; Misto da Huíla; Primeiro de Maio	CPPL; Heja SC; Misto do Bié; Sporting de Benguela

== Preliminary rounds ==
Qualified for the quarterfinals

=== Group A ===
	Teams	M	W	L	PF	PA	Diff	P
1.	Amigos de Viana	3	3	0	288	183	+105	6
2.	Desportivo da Huíla	3	2	1	191	188	+3	5
3.	Primeiro de Maio	3	1	2	182	262	–80	4
4.	Misto da Huíla	3	0	3	219	247	–28	3

November 16, 2013

Amigos de Viana	95–85	Misto da Huíla

Pavilhão do Benfica do Lubango, Lubango

November 16, 2013

Primeiro de Maio	53–70	Desportivo da Huíla

Pavilhão do Benfica do Lubango, Lubango

November 17, 2013

Misto da Huíla	63–73	Primeiro de Maio

Pavilhão do Benfica do Lubango, Lubango

November 17, 2013

Desportivo da Huíla	42–64	Amigos de Viana

Pavilhão do Benfica do Lubango, Lubango

November 19, 2013

Amigos de Viana	129–56	Primeiro de Maio

Pavilhão do Benfica do Lubango, Lubango

November 19, 2013

Misto da Huíla	71–79	Desportivo Huíla

Pavilhão do Benfica do Lubango, Lubango

Qualified for the quarterfinals

=== Group B ===
	Teams	M	W	L	PF	PA	Diff	P
1.	Sporting de Benguela	3	3	0	261	187	+74	6
2.	CPPL	3	2	1	247	218	+29	5
3.	Misto do Bié	3	1	2	226	274	–48	4
4.	Heja SC	3	0	3	223	278	–55	3

November 16, 2013

Misto Bié	100–95	Heja SC

Pavilhão do Benfica do Lubango, Lubango

November 16, 2013

Sporting Benguela	83–68	CPPL

Pavilhão do Benfica do Lubango, Lubango

November 18, 2013

CPPL	87–58	Misto Bié

Pavilhão do Benfica do Lubango, Lubango

November 18, 2013

Heja SC	51–86	Sporting Benguela

Pavilhão do Benfica do Lubango, Lubango

November 20, 2013

CPPL	92–77	Heja SC

Pavilhão do Benfica do Lubango, Lubango

November 20, 2013

Sporting Benguela	92–68	Misto do Bié

Pavilhão do Benfica do Lubango, Lubango

== Knockout stage ==
Quarter-finals
November 21
Heja SC	67
Amigos de Viana	97
November 21
Misto da Huíla	52
CPPL	64
November 21
Misto do Bié	97
Desportivo da Huíla	101
November 21
Primeiro de Maio	40
Sporting Benguela	112

5th-8th Place
November 22
Heja SC	115
Misto da Huíla	60
November 22
Misto do Bié	90
Primeiro de Maio	61

5th place
November 23
Heja SC	88
Misto do Bié	77
7th place
November 23
Misto da Huíla	64
Primeiro de Maio	60

Quarter-finals
November 21
Sporting Benguela	112
Primeiro de Maio	40
November 21
Desportivo da Huíla	101
Misto do Bié	97
November 21
Amigos de Viana	97
Heja SC	67
November 21
CPPL	64
Misto da Huíla	52

Semi-finals
November 22
Sporting de Benguela	83
Desportivo da Huíla	62
November 22
Amigos de Viana	101
CPPL	74

Final
November 23
Sporting de Benguela	107
Amigos de Viana	76
Third place
November 23
CPPL	92
Desportivo da Huíla	56

=== Quarterfinals ===
November 21, 2013

Primeiro de Maio	40–112	Sporting de Benguela

Pavilhão do Benfica do Lubango, Lubango

November 21, 2013

Misto Huíla	52–64	CPPL

Pavilhão do Benfica do Lubango, Lubango

November 21, 2013

Amigos Viana	97–67	Heja SC

Pavilhão do Benfica do Lubango, Lubango

November 21, 2013

Desportivo Huíla	101–97	Misto do Bié

Pavilhão do Benfica do Lubango, Lubango

=== 5–8th place ===
November 22, 2013

Heja SC	115–60	Misto Huíla

Pavilhão do Benfica do Lubango, Lubango

November 22, 2013

Misto do Bié	90–61	Primeiro de Maio

Pavilhão do Benfica do Lubango, Lubango

=== Semifinals ===
November 22, 2013

Sporting de Benguela	83–62	Desportivo da Huíla

Pavilhão do Benfica do Lubango, Lubango

November 22, 2013

CPPL	74–101	Amigos Viana

Pavilhão do Benfica do Lubango, Lubango

=== 7th place ===
November 23, 2013

Primeiro de Maio	60–64	Misto da Huíla

Pavilhão do Benfica do Lubango, Lubango

=== 5th place ===
November 23, 2013

[ Boxscore]

Heja SC	88–77	Misto do Bié

Pavilhão do Benfica do Lubango, Lubango

=== Bronze medal game ===
November 23, 2013

Desp Huíla	56–92	CPPL

Pavilhão do Benfica do Lubango, Lubango

=== Gold medal game ===
November 23, 2013

Sporting de Benguela	107–76	Amigos de Viana
Scoring by quarter: 28-12, 27-22, 27-24, 25-18

Pavilhão do Benfica do Lubango, Lubango

== Final standings ==
Qualified for the 2013–14 BAI Basket

Rank	Team	Record
Gold medal	Sporting de Benguela	6–0
Silver medal	Amigos de Viana	5–1
Bronze medal	CPPL	4–2
4.	Desportivo da Huíla	3–3
5.	Heja SC	2–4
6.	Misto do Bié	2–4
7.	Misto da Huíla	1–5
8.	Primeiro de Maio	1–5

== All Tournament Team ==
G	(Angola)	Moreno José
G	(Angola)	Valdemar Martins
F	(Angola)	Ivanilson Fontoura
F	(Angola)	Raúl João
C	(Angola)	Josemar de Carvalho

2013 Angola 2nd Division Basketball Championship

Sporting Clube de Benguela
1st Title

Most Valuable Player
(Angola) António Deográcio

== See also ==
- 2013–14 BAI Basket
