= 2014 Angola Second Division Basketball Championship =

Tournament details
- Host country: Angola
- Dates: September 17 – 25
- Teams: 4
- Venue(s): 1 (in 1 host city)

Final positions
- Champions: Angola (Progresso do Sambizanga's 1st titleth title)

The 2014 Angola 2nd Division Basketball Championship (2nd edition), was a basketball tournament held in Kuito, Bié, Angola, from September 17 to 25, 2014. The tournament, organized by the Angolan Basketball Federation, qualified the two top teams for the 2014–15 BIC Basket and was contested by 4 clubs, that played in a double round robin system followed by the knock-out stages (semis and final).

The tournament was won by Progresso do Sambizanga.

== Teams ==
- Casa do Pessoal do Porto do Lobito
- Marinha de Guerra de Angola
- Sporting Clube do Bié
- Progresso do Sambizanga

== Preliminary rounds ==
Qualified for the quarterfinals

	Teams	M	W	L	PF	PA	Diff	P
1.	Progresso do Sambizanga	3	3	0	288	183	+105	6
2.	CPPL	3	2	1	191	188	+3	5
3.	Marinha de Guerra	3	1	2	182	262	–80	4
4.	Sporting do Bié	3	0	3	219	247	–28	3

September 17, 2014

Progresso	92–49	CPPL

Pavilhão do Sporting do Bié, Kuito

Marinha	85–82	Sporting

September 18, 2014

Progresso	83–50	Marinha

Pavilhão do Sporting do Bié, Kuito

Sporting	71–95	CPPL

September 19, 2014

CPPL	73–82	Marinha

Pavilhão do Sporting do Bié, Kuito

Progresso	124–64	Sporting

September 20, 2014

CPPL	76–89	Progresso

Pavilhão do Sporting do Bié, Kuito

Sporting	78–83	Marinha

September 22, 2014

Marinha	63–113	Progresso

Pavilhão do Sporting do Bié, Kuito

CPPL	83–78	Sporting

September 23, 2014

Marinha	91–86	CPPL

Pavilhão do Sporting do Bié, Kuito

Sporting	65–114	Progresso

== Semi-finals ==
September 25, 2014

Progresso	128–65	Sporting

Pavilhão do Sporting do Bié, Kuito

Marinha	69–86	CPPL

== Bronze medal match ==
September 27, 2014

Marinha	90–74	Sporting

Pavilhão do Sporting do Bié, Kuito

== Final ==
September 27, 2014

Progresso	97–58	CPPL

Pavilhão do Sporting do Bié, Kuito

== Final standings ==
Qualified for the 2014–15 BIC Basket

Rank	Team	Record
Gold medal	Progresso do Sambizanga	6–0
Silver medal	CPPL	5–1
Bronze medal	Marinha de Guerra	4–2
4.	Sporting do Bié	3–3

2014 Angola 2nd Division Basketball Championship

Progresso Associação do Sambizanga
1st Title

Most Valuable Player

== See also ==
- 2014–15 BIC Basket
