= Carlos Dinis =

Angolan basketball coach

ASA
- Position: Head Coach
- League: Angola Basketball League

Personal information
- Born: April 4, 1966 (age 60) Luanda, Angola

Career history

Coaching
- Desportivo da Cuca
- Desportivo da Banca
- Leça FC
- BC Barcelos
- 2004–present: ASA
- 2015: Angola B
- 2016: Angola A
Medals
Men's basketball
Representing Angola
African Games
Gold medal – first place	Brazzaville 2015	National Team
FIBA Africa Under-18 Championship
Silver medal – second place	Alexandria 2008	National Team
FIBA Africa Clubs Champions Cup
Bronze medal – third place	Sousse 2008	ASA

Carlos António Dinis (born April 4, 1966, in Luanda) is an Angolan basketball head coach. He is a brother of Angolan former football player Joaquim Dinis.

== Career ==
Dinis is the head coach of Angolan side Atlético Sport Aviação (ASA), while also being the head coach of Angola's U18 basketball team.

In February 2016, he was appointed head coach of the Angolan senior basketball team, ahead of the qualification tournament for the 2016 Olympic games.
