= C.D. Marinha de Guerra =

Marinha de Guerra
- Leagues: Angolan Basketball League
- History: C.D. Marinha de Guerra; 2014–present
- Arena: Pavilhão Victorino Cunha
- Capacity: 2,000
- Location: Luanda, Angola
- Team colors: Light Blue, Blue, White
- President: Admiral Benevenito Vaz
- Head coach: Walter Costa

Clube Desportivo da Marinha de Guerra de Angola is a semi-professional basketball club from Angola. The club, based in Luanda, is attached to the Angolan Navy and an affiliate of C.D. Primeiro de Agosto.

The club's men's basketball team made its debut at the Angolan top tier basketball league (Unitel Basket) in 2014, after finishing third at the 2014 Angolan 2nd division basketball championship, as a last-minute replacement to runner-up C.P.P.L. which withdrew for financial motives.

== Roster ==
Note: Flags indicate national team eligibility at FIBA-sanctioned events. Players may hold other non-FIBA nationalities not displayed.

C.D. Marinha de Guerra roster
Players
Coaches

Pos.	No.	Nat.	Name	Ht.	Wt.	Age
SF	1	(Angola)	Osvaldo Castro			37 – 24 August 1989
SG	2	(Angola)	Carlos Cabral	1.85 m (6 ft 1 in)	95 kg (209 lb)	31 – 18 August 1995
PG	3	(Angola)	Manuel Nowa			36 – 2 March 1990
	4	(Angola)	Reginaldo Kanza	1.99 m (6 ft 6 in)		32 – 10 May 1994
PF	5	(Angola)	Sílvio Ncanga			35 – 9 September 1991
PG	6	(Angola)	Waldir Gonçalves			31 – 5 September 1995
PF	8	(Angola)	Aguinaldo Francisco			35 – 25 May 1991
C	9	(Angola)	Joel Fernandes	2.02 m (6 ft 8 in)		32 – 6 May 1994
	10	(Angola) (Portugal)	Herlander Tavares			31 – 27 August 1995
C	11	(Angola)	Joaquim Nunda			34 – 10 December 1991
SF	12	(Angola)	Edson Hilukilwa			36 – 12 January 1990
PF	15	(Angola)	José Fula			37 – 31 December 1988
		(Angola)	Ivanádio Menezes			32 – 23 March 1994
		(Angola)	Paulo Sopita			33 – 6 October 1993

Head coach

- (Angola) Walter Costa

Assistant coach(es)

- (Angola) Vladimir Gerónimo
- (Angola) Dionísio Raimundo

Legend

- (C) Team captain
- Injured

Updated as of April 15th, 2016

=== Depth chart ===
Pos.	Starting 5	Bench 1	Bench 2
C	Joaquim Nunda	Joel Fernandes	Ludgero Galiza
PF	José Fula	Sílvio Ncanga	Aguinaldo Francisco
SF	Edson Hilukilwa	Osvaldo Castro
SG	Carlos Cabral
PG	Manuel Nowa	Waldir Gonçalves

== Manager history ==
- Walter Costa – 2017
- Paulo Macedo – 2015, 2016
- Aníbal Moreira – 2014

== Players ==
Marinha de Guerra Basketball players

=== 2015–2018 ===
Nat	#	Name	A	P	H	W	Paulo Macedo			W.C.
Nat	#	Name	A	P	H	W	2015	2016	2017	2018
Nat	#	Name	A	P	H	W	–	–	–	–
(Angola)	4	Adilson Paulo Vasco	⋅	⋅	⋅	⋅	⋅	⋅	–	2018
(Angola)	⋅	Agostinho Coelho	27	SF	1.98	90	⋅	→	7	⋅
(Angola)	⋅	Aguinaldo Francisco	25	PF			8	8	⋅	⋅
(Angola)	8	Aguinaldo Jaime	⋅	⋅	⋅	⋅	⋅	⋅	–	2018
(Angola)	16	António Ndalimbiliwa	⋅	⋅	⋅	⋅	⋅	⋅	⋅	2018
(Angola)	⋅	Carlos Cabral	22	SG	1.85	95	⋅	2	2	→
(Angola)	⋅	Carlos Sequeira		G	1.65		14	⋅	⋅	⋅
(Angola)	7	Daniel Manuel	21	⋅	⋅		⋅	⋅	⋅	2018
(Angola)	⋅	Edmilson Miranda	⋅	⋅	⋅	⋅	⋅	⋅	–	⋅
(Angola)	12	Edson Hilukilwa	28	SF			⋅	12	12	2018
(Angola)	⋅	Eduardo Kiabola	21	⋅	⋅		10	→	⋅	⋅
(Angola)	10	Eusébio Santos	⋅	⋅	⋅	⋅	⋅	⋅	–	2018
(Angola)	⋅	Evaldo Castro	⋅	⋅	⋅	⋅	⋅	⋅	–	⋅
(Angola)	⋅	Francisco Mieze	21	⋅	2.02		12	⋅	⋅	⋅
(Angola)	⋅	Garcia Destino	⋅	⋅	⋅	⋅	⋅	⋅	–	⋅
(Angola)	⋅	Herlander Tavares	21	⋅			⋅	10	⋅	⋅
(Angola)	⋅	Ivanádio Menezes	22	⋅			7	7	⋅	⋅
(Angola)	11	Joaquim Nunda	27	C			11	11	11	2018
(Angola)	⋅	Joel Fernandes	22	C	2.02		9	9	→	⋅
(Angola)	⋅	José Fula	29	C			⋅	15	15	⋅
(Angola)	⋅	Ludgero Galiza	24	C			13	13	→	⋅
(Angola)	⋅	Manuel Nowa	26	PG			⋅	3	⋅	⋅
(Angola)	3	Moussa Kaba	⋅	⋅			⋅	10	3	2018
(Angola)	⋅	Osvaldo Castro	28	SF			⋅	1	1	⋅
(Angola)	⋅	Paulo Sopita	23	⋅			5	–	⋅	⋅
(Angola)	⋅	Reginaldo Kanza	22	⋅	1.99		4	4	→	⋅
(Angola)	⋅	Silvio Ncanga	26	PF			⋅	5	5	→
(Angola)	15	Tárcio Domingos	20				⋅	⋅	→	2018
(Angola)	6	Waldir Gonçalves	25	PG			6	6	6	2018

== Other sports ==
- Handball
