= Casa do Pessoal do Porto do Lobito (basketball) =

CPPL
- Leagues: Unitel Basket
- Founded: 17 March 1952; 73 years ago
- History: Casa do Pessoal do Porto do Lobito (1952–present)
- Arena: Pavilhão da CPPL
- Capacity: 2,000
- Location: Lobito, Angola
- Head coach: João Leal
- Website: portodolobito.co.ao/cppl/
Home

Casa do Pessoal do Porto do Lobito, commonly known as CPPL, is a multisports club from Lobito, Angola. Its men's basketball team competes at the Angolan Basketball League (also known as Unitel Basket), as well as other local competitions organized by the Angolan Basketball Federation. Other prominent sports in the club are handball and roller hockey.

The club is officially the Port of Lobito (in Portuguese: Porto do Lobito) and its full name literally translates as "Lobito Harbour Staff Club".

== History ==
The CPPL organisation was founded in 1952 by a group of employees of the Port of Lobito with the goal of providing rest and recreation for the port workers.

In the early 2000s, CPPL was a regular participant of the Angolan Basketball League. Financial shortages caused the senior basketball department to be suspended, only to be revamped in the early 2010s.

After an unsuccessful attempt to access the 2013–14 BAI Basket, (finished 3rd in the 2013 Angola Second Division Basketball Championship) CPPL was the runner-up at the 2014 tournament, thus gaining access to the 2015 BIC Basket.

In November 2014, shortly before the beginning of the league, the club announced that it would not participate in the championship citing financial reasons.

In the 2021–22 season, CPPL returned to the premier Angolan League after a 5-year absence since 2016.

== Season by season ==
Season	Tier	League	Regular season					Playoffs	Taça de Angola
Season	Tier	League	Finish	Played	Wins	Losses	Win%	Playoffs	Taça de Angola
CPPL
2021–22	1	Angolan League	8th	25	12	13	.480	Quarterfinalist	
2022–23	1	Angolan League	7th	23	10	13	.435	Quarterfinalist	

== See also ==
- Casa do Pessoal do Porto do Lobito (handball)
