= Universidade Lusíada de Angola =

- Leagues: Men: Angola League; Women: Angola Women's League
- Founded: 1 January 2007; 18 years ago
- Dissolved: November 2021; 3 years ago
- History: Universidade Lusíada de Angola (2007–2021)
- Arena: Pavilhão Anexo
- Capacity: 1,500
- Location: Luanda, Angola
- Team colors: Yellow and Bue
- President: Rui Mingas
- Head coach: Manuel Silva Gi (Men); Alexandre Neto (Women)

The Universidade Lusíada de Angola, also known as U.L.A. was an Angolan semi-professional basketball team which is named after its major sponsor, the Angolan Lusíadas University.

The men's team made its debut at the Angolan premier basketball league (BAI Basket) at the 2006–07 season whereas the women's team was established in February 2014 as it took over Juventude de Viana's women's basketball team, following the latter's disbanding.

They stayed in the BAI Basket for ten straight seasons, before the team was forced to leave the competition in November 2021. Vice President Paulo Murais cited financial problems that had been going on for seven years, with the economic crisis due to the COVID-19 pandemic being the final blow.

== Players ==
Universidade Lusíada Men's Basketball players

=== 2014–2018 ===
Nat	#	Name	A	P	H	W	O.F.	Raúl Duarte			M.S.
Nat	#	Name	A	P	H	W	2014	2015	2016	2017	2018
Nat	#	Name	A	P	H	W	5	–	–	–	–
(Angola)	⋅	Adilson Paulo	23	C			⋅	13	13	⋅	⋅
(Angola)	9	André Nsingi	⋅	⋅	1.83		⋅	⋅	⋅	⋅	2018
(Angola)	13	António Baptista	⋅	⋅	⋅		⋅	⋅	⋅	13	2018
(Angola)	7	António Congo	22	⋅			⋅	⋅	16	7	2018
(Angola)	⋅	Ayrton Dala	⋅	⋅	⋅		⋅	⋅	⋅	16	⋅
(Angola)	12	Cesaltino Neto	⋅	⋅	⋅		⋅	⋅	⋅	⋅	2018
(Angola)	–	Dário Pereira	⋅	⋅	⋅		⋅	⋅	⋅	8	2018
(Angola)	⋅	Edivaldo Cardoso	25	⋅			⋅	12	6	⋅	⋅
(Angola)	⋅	Elmer Felix	25	G			7	⋅	⋅	⋅	⋅
(Angola)	15	Erickson António	⋅	⋅	⋅		⋅	⋅	⋅	⋅	2018
(Angola)	⋅	Escórcio António	29	⋅			⋅	9	9	→	⋅
(Angola)	⋅	Eusébio Santos	26	⋅			15	10	10	⋅	⋅
(Angola)	⋅	Garcia Destino	22	⋅			⋅	⋅	7	→	⋅
(Angola)	8	Goldafim Freitas	25	⋅	⋅	–	⋅	⋅	⋅	→	2018
(Angola)	⋅	Hélder Cristina	25	⋅			⋅	7	→	⋅	⋅
(Angola)	⋅	Hélio Daniel	29	⋅			⋅	⋅	14	14	⋅
(Angola)	10	Herlandes Tavares	⋅	⋅	⋅		⋅	⋅	⋅	10	2018
(Angola)	⋅	Hugo Cristiano	31	PF			⋅	15	⋅	⋅	⋅
(Angola)	⋅	João Filho	23	⋅			⋅	16	⋅	⋅	⋅
(Angola)	15	João Silva Manuel	⋅	⋅	⋅		⋅	⋅	⋅	⋅	2018
(Angola)	⋅	Joaquim Costa	28	⋅			8	8	8	→	⋅
(Angola)	⋅	Joaquim Nunda	23	C			11	⋅	⋅	⋅	⋅
(Angola)	6	Joel Fernandes	24	C	2.02		⋅	⋅	→	6	2018
(Angola)	16	Mike Banda	⋅	⋅	⋅		⋅	⋅	⋅	⋅	2018
(Angola)	⋅	José Miguel		⋅			⋅	6	–	⋅	⋅
(Angola)	⋅	José Salvador	26	G			–	4	4	→	⋅
(Angola)	14	Kevin Albino	⋅	⋅	⋅		⋅	⋅	⋅	⋅	2018
(Angola)	⋅	Levi Mouélé	25	G			⋅	5	5	⋅	⋅
(Angola)	⋅	Luís Fernandes	⋅	F			14	14	⋅	⋅	⋅
(Angola)	⋅	Nsingi André	⋅	⋅	⋅		⋅	⋅	⋅	9	⋅
(Angola)	11	Pedro Chita	22	⋅	67	⋅	⋅	⋅	⋅	11	2018
(Angola)	⋅	Ramalho Lemos	28	⋅			–	11	11	→	⋅
(Angola)	4	Reginaldo Kanza	24	⋅	1.99		⋅	⋅	→	4	2018
(Angola)	⋅	Romenigue Sambo	26	⋅			4	→	⋅	⋅	⋅
(Angola)	⋅	Sebastião Quicuambi	26	⋅	1.96		12	⋅	⋅	⋅	⋅
(Angola)	⋅	Wilson João	27	⋅	1.78	75	5	⋅	⋅	⋅	⋅
(Angola)	⋅	Wilson Manuel	⋅	⋅			9	⋅	⋅	⋅	⋅
(Angola)	⋅	Xavier Franqueira	⋅	⋅	⋅		⋅	⋅	⋅	15	⋅

Universidade Lusíada Women's Basketball players

=== 2014–2015 ===
Nat	Name	A	P	H	W	Alex. Neto	
Nat	Name	A	P	H	W	2014	2015
Nat	Name	A	P	H	W	4	4
(Angola)	Flora Bernardo	⋅	⋅			15	15
(Angola)	Givete Pedro	⋅	C			14	14
(Angola)	Helena Viegas	20	G	1.70		8	8
(Angola)	Henriqueta Eduardo	⋅	⋅			5	5
(Angola)	Leopoldina Emídio	18	⋅			11	11
(Angola)	Madalena Valentim	⋅	⋅			9	9
(Angola)	Romana Mateus	⋅	G			4	4
(Angola)	Stella Longue	⋅	F			7	7

== See also ==
- Angola Women's Basketball League
- Federação Angolana de Basquetebol
