= 2016–17 BIC Basket =

BIC Basket 2016–17
- League: BIC Basket
- Sport: Basketball
- Duration: November 15, 2016 – May 25, 2017
- Teams: 9
- TV partner(s): TPA2 (Angola); TPA Internacional

BIC Basket season 2016–2017
- Season champions: Rec do Libolo
- Season MVP: Olímpio Cipriano

BAI Basket seasons
- ← 2015–16 2017–18 →

The 2016–17 BIC Basket (39th edition), Angola's top tier basketball club competition, ran from November 15, 2016 through May 25, 2017. It consists of four stages plus the playoffs. At the initial stage (regular season) all nine teams played each other in a double round robin system. In stage 2 (group stage), the top five teams from the regular season played in a single round robin in each group. In stage 3 (qualification stage), the top five teams from group stage 1 played in a round robin in group A whereas the four teams in group B plus the relegated team from group A played round robin classification matches in group B. In stage 4 (playoffs), a best-of-five series will be played between first-seeded vs eighth-seeded, 4th vs 5th, 2nd vs 7th and 3rd vs 6th. The winners of the first and second match-up and of the third and fourth will play a best-of-five semifinal playoff whereas the losers will play a best-of-three 5th-8th classification round. The final will be played in a best-of-seven series.

== BIC Basket Participants (2016–17 Season) ==
Promoted from 2nd Division

Team	Home
ASA	Luanda
Marinha	Luanda
Interclube	Luanda
Petro de Luanda	Luanda
Primeiro de Agosto	Luanda
Progresso	Luanda
Recreativo do Libolo	Luanda
Universidade Lusíada	Luanda
F.C. Vila Clotilde	Luanda

== Regular Season (November 15, 2016 - 18 February 2017) ==
	ASA	INT	MAR	PET	PRI	PRO	LIB	LUS	VIL	Rec.
ASA		59–73; 21 Jan 1(2)	– 18 Nov 2(1)	76–104; 17 Feb 8(2)	69–79; 24 Nov 4(1)	– 28 Jan 3(2)	70–107; 18 Feb 9(2)	63–62; 4 Feb 5(2)	81–73; 13 Jan 7(1)	3–5
Interclube	82–57; 15 Nov 1(1)		71–82; 26 Nov 6(1)	60–87; 19 Nov 3(1)	69–81; 14 Jan 8(1)	84–60; 11 Feb 7(2)	83–85; 3 Feb 4(2)	77–67; 20 Jan 9(1)	91–60; 27 Jan 2(2)	4–4
Marinha	95–92; 27 Jan 2(2)	84–82; 10 Feb 6(2)		78–83; 3 Feb 4(2)	76–85; 20 Jan 9(1)	73–54; 14 Jan 8(1)	74–81; 17 Jan 5(1)	0–20; 15 Nov 1(1)	89–79; 19 Nov 3(1)	4–4
Petro de Luanda	103–66; 14 Jan 8(1)	88–79; 28 Jan 3(2)	97–76; 22 Nov 4(1)		97–86; 10 Jan 6(1)	103–82; 4 Feb 5(2)	116–120; 6 Jan 2(1)	83–51; 11 Feb 7(2)	133–79; 18 Feb 9(2)	7–1
Primeiro de Agosto	96–84; 3 Feb 4(2)	83–60; 17 Feb 8(2)	94–90; 18 Feb 9(2)	95–88; 10 Feb 6(2)		96–68; 21 Jan 1(2)	88–91; 13 Jan 7(1)	81–41; 16 Nov 3(1)	106–70; 6 Jan 5(1)	7–1
Progresso	80–67; 19 Nov 3(1)	56–70; 13 Jan 7(1)	69–75; 17 Feb 8(2)	69–81; 25 Nov 5(1)	73–83; 15 Nov 1(1)		74–104; 10 Feb 6(2)	– 27 Jan 2(2)	– 3 Feb 4(2)	3–5
Recreativo do Libolo	96–69; 20 Jan 9(1)	69–65; 7 Jan 4(1)	80–62; 4 Feb 5(2)	101–84; 27 Jan 2(2)	103–94; 11 Feb 7(2)	99–55; 10 Jan 6(1)		104–68; 14 Jan 8(1)	90–67; 15 Nov 1(1)	8–0
Universidade Lusíada	– 25 Nov 5(1)	58–88; 18 Feb 9(2)	80–67; 21 Jan 1(2)	74–102; 13 Jan 7(1)	58–95; 28 Jan 3(2)	46–85; 18 Nov 2(1)	62–74; 17 Feb 8(2)		58–64; 10 Feb 6(2)	1–7
Vila Clotilde	95–86; 11 Feb 7(2)	68–104; 18 Nov 2(1)	73–67; 28 Jan 3(2)	70–100; 20 Jan 9(1)	64–114; 4 Feb 5(2)	82–90; 22 Nov 4(1)	60–85; 21 Jan 1(2)	75–72; 26 Nov 6(1)		3–5
Record	1–7	4–4	3–5	6–2	6–2	2–6	8–0	1–7	1–7	

- Note: Small number and number in brackets indicate round number and leg, respectively
  Next scheduled games

=== Regular season standings ===
Updated as of 19 February 2017

Pos	Team	M	W	L	PF	PA	D	Pts
1	Recreativo do Libolo	16	16	0				32
2	Petro de Luanda	16	13	3				29
3	Primeiro de Agosto	16	13	3				29
4	Interclube	16	8	8				24
5	Marinha *	16	7	9				22
6	Progresso	16	5	11				21
7	ASA	16	4	12				20
8	Vila Clotilde	16	4	12				20
9	Universidade Lusíada	16	2	14				18

- 1 loss by default (no point awarded)

== Stage 2 (March 3 - April 15, 2017) ==
Times given below are in WAT UTC+1.

=== Group A ===
Fri, 03 Mar 2017
1º de Agosto	89 : 88	Interclube
Rec do Libolo	85 : 75	Progresso
Petro Atlético	91 : 85	Marinha
Sat, 04 Mar 2017
Marinha	67 : 81	Rec do Libolo
Interclube	65 : 71	Progresso
Petro Atlético	93 : 90	1º de Agosto
Tue, 07 Mar 2017
Rec do Libolo	103 : 62	Interclube
Marinha	79 : 101	1º de Agosto
Progresso	97 : 87	Petro Atlético
Fri, 10 Mar 2017
Marinha	:	Progresso
Petro Atlético	70 : 72	Interclube
1º de Agosto	86 : 100	Rec do Libolo
Fri, 17 Mar 2017
Interclube	62 : 66	Marinha
1º de Agosto	82 : 73	Progresso
Rec do Libolo	93 : 79	Petro Atlético

Sat, 18 Mar 2017
Interclube	72 : 77	1º de Agosto
Progresso	64 : 82	Rec do Libolo
Marinha	81 : 82	Petro Atlético
Fri, 07 Apr 2017
Rec do Libolo	110 : 71	Marinha
Progresso	91 : 71	Interclube
1º de Agosto	81 : 89	Petro Atlético
Sat, 08 Apr 2017
Interclube	65 : 69	Rec do Libolo
1º de Agosto	76 : 81	Marinha
Petro Atlético	95 : 76	Progresso
Fri, 14 Apr 2017
Progresso	:	Marinha
Interclube	82 : 74	Petro Atlético
Rec do Libolo	83 : 86	1º de Agosto
Sat, 15 Apr 2017
Marinha	73 : 78	Interclube
Progresso	75 : 83	1º de Agosto
Petro Atlético	75 : 83	Rec do Libolo

Pos	Team	Pld	W	L	GF	GA	GDIF	Pts
1	Rec do Libolo	26	25	1	2381	1919	+462	51
2	1º de Agosto	26	19	7	2307	2034	+273	45
3	Petro Atlético	26	18	8	2382	2105	+277	44
4	Interclube	26	11	15	1955	1963	-8	37
5	Progresso	25	9	16	1884	2034	-150	34
6	Marinha	25	9	16	1914	2019	-105	33

Advance to quarter-finals

=== Group B ===
Fri, 03 Mar 2017
ASA	89 : 81	Vila Clotilde
Sat, 04 Mar 2017
Univ Lusíada	69 : 62	Vila Clotilde
Tue, 07 Mar 2017
Univ Lusíada	66 : 69	ASA

Fri, 10 Mar 2017
Vila Clotilde	60 : 58	ASA
Fri, 17 Mar 2017
ASA	:	Univ Lusíada
Sat, 18 Mar 2017
Vila Clotilde	74 : 81	Univ Lusíada

Pos	Team	Pld	W	L	GF	GA	GDIF	Pts
1	ASA	20_{(4)}	7_{(3)}	13_{(1)}	0	0	0	27_{(7)}
2	Univ Lusíada	20_{(4)}	4_{(2)}	16_{(2)}	0	0	0	24_{(6)}
3	Vila Clotilde	20_{(4)}	5_{(1)}	15_{(3)}	0	0	0	25_{(5)}

Advance to quarter-finals

== 5–8th classification ==
Thu, 27 Apr 2017
Vila Clotilde	91 : 71	Univ Lusíada
Sat, 29 Apr 2017
Univ Lusíada	65 : 56	Vila Clotilde
Tue, 02 May 2017
Vila Clotilde	89 : 76	Univ Lusíada

== 5–8th classification ==
May 2017
Marinha	84 : 74	Vila Clotilde
Sat, 06 May 2017
Vila Clotilde	87 : 84	Marinha
Tue, 09 May 2017
Marinha	:	Vila Clotilde

May 2017
Progresso	:	ASA
May 2017
ASA	59 : 48	Progresso

== Quarter-finals ==
Libolo bt Lusíada

Fri, 21 Apr 2017
Rec do Libolo	90 : 79	Univ Lusíada
Sat, 22 Apr 2017
Univ Lusíada	69 : 89	Rec do Libolo

Petro bt Progresso

Fri, 21 Apr 2017
Petro Atlético	75 : 64	Progresso
Sat, 22 Apr 2017
Progresso	75 : 99	Petro Atlético

Interclube bt Marinha

Fri, 21 Apr 2017
Interclube	79 : 74	Marinha
Sat, 22 Apr 2017
Marinha	:	Interclube

1º de Agosto bt ASA

Fri, 21 Apr 2017
1º de Agosto	84 : 64	ASA
Sat, 22 Apr 2017
ASA	:	1º de Agosto

== Semifinals ==
Libolo bt Interclube

Sat, 29 Apr 2017
Rec do Libolo	97 : 96	Interclube
Tue, 02 May 2017
Interclube	83 : 89	Rec do Libolo
Thu, 04 May 2017
Rec do Libolo	98 : 78	Interclube

Petro bt D'Agosto

Sat, 29 Apr 2017
1º de Agosto	101 : 93	Petro Atlético
Wed, 03 May 2017
Petro Atlético	94 : 91	1º de Agosto
Fri, 05 May 2017
1º de Agosto	82 : 89	Petro Atlético
Wed, 10 May 2017
Petro Atlético	95 : 86	1º de Agosto

== Fifth place match ==
Wed, 17 May 2017
ASA	88 : 78	Marinha
Fri, 19 May 2017
Marinha	:	ASA

== Third place match ==
Wed, 17 May 2017
1º de Agosto	99 : 78	Interclube
Fri, 19 May 2017
Interclube	88 : 85	1º de Agosto
Mon, 22 May 2017
1º de Agosto	96 : 82	Interclube

== Final ==
Thu, 18 May 2017
18:00 WAT UTC+1

Rec do Libolo	97–96	Petro Atlético
Scoring by quarter: 18-22, 31-21, 23-30, 25-23
Pts: Harris 26; Rebs: Milton 6 Asts: Foster 8		Pts: Moore 29; Asts: Bastos, Lukeny 5
1–0

Pavilhão Dreamspace, Luanda
Referees: Fra. Tando, F. Pacheco, Cla. Anderson

Sat, 20 May 2017
18:00 WAT UTC+1

Rec do Libolo	87–85	Petro Atlético
Scoring by quarter: 18-26, 24-24, 21-20, 15-24
Pts: Milton 20		Pts: Leonel 26
2–0

Pavilhão Dreamspace, Luanda
Referees: Osv. Neto, M. Pedro, Dom. Manuel

Tue, 23 May 2017
19:00 WAT UTC+1

Petro Atlético	103–106	Rec do Libolo
Scoring by quarter: 21-20, 32-23, 28-27, 32-36
Pts: Bastos 34; Rebs: Leonel, Moore 5 Asts: Bonifácio 4		Pts: Olímpio 26; Rebs: four players 4 Asts: Milton 5
0–3

Pavilhão da Cidadela, Luanda
Referees: Ant. Bernardo, Cle. Francisco, Pau.Luvati

Thu, 25 May 2017
18:00 WAT UTC+1

Petro Atlético	87–96 (OT)	Rec do Libolo
Scoring by quarter: 20-26, 22-23, 23-18, 20-18, Overtime: 2-11
Pts: Leonel 16; Rebs: Bastos 6 Asts: Bastos, Lukeny 4		Pts: Foster 17; Rebs: Quimbamba 8 Asts: Olímpio 5
0–4

Pavilhão da Cidadela, Luanda
Referees: Fra. Tando, Fer. Pacheco, Osv. Neto

== See also ==
- BIC Basket
- 2016 2nd Division Basketball
- BAI Basket Past Seasons
- Federação Angolana de Basquetebol
