= 2013–14 BAI Basket =

BAI Basket 2013–14
- League: BAI Basket
- Sport: Basketball
- Duration: November 15, 2013 – May 22, 2014
- Teams: 10
- TV partner: TPA1 (Angola) TPA Internacional (Worldwide) Supersport (Africa)

BAI Basket season 2013–2014
- Champion: Recreativo do Libolo
- Season MVP: (Angola) Eduardo Mingas

BAI Basket seasons
- ← 2012–13 2014–15 →

The 2013–14 BAI Basket (36th edition), Angola's top tier basketball club competition, ran from November 15, 2013 through May 20, 2014.

Recreativo do Libolo won the championship after finishing the final four with a 10-2 record.

== BAI Basket Participants (2013–14 Season) ==
Promoted from 2nd Division

Team	Home
Amigos de Viana	Luanda
ASA	Luanda
Interclube	Luanda
Petro de Luanda	Luanda
Primeiro de Agosto	Luanda
Progresso	Luanda
Recreativo do Libolo	Luanda
Sporting de Benguela	Benguela
Universidade Lusíada	Luanda
F.C. Vila Clotilde	Luanda

== Regular Season (November 15, 2013 - March 1, 2014) ==
	ASA	CAV	INT	PET	PRI	PRO	LIB	SCB	LUS	VIL	Rec.
ASA		118–57; 08 Feb 4(2)	58-64– 9(1)	83–99; 10 Dec 7(1)	68–96; 19 Jan 8(1)	73–76; 31 Jan 1(2)	85–94; 07 Jan 5(1)	95–74; 20 Dec 6(1)	81–82– 07 Feb 3(2)	69–55; 02 Feb 2(2)	3–6
Amigos de Viana	36–119; 4(1)		– 5(1)	– 1(1)	– 17 Jan 3(1)	– 06 Dec 7(1)	– 6(2)	51–81; 22 Feb 8(2)	– 14 Dec 2(1)	– 9(1)	0–9
Interclube	76–71; 28 Feb 9(2)	131-61; 14 Feb 5(2)		73–84; 07 Feb 3(2)	93–96; 29 Feb 4(2)	94–57; 6(1)	87–101; 24 Jan 1(2)	– 2(2)	88-71; 07 Dec 8(1)	– 06 Dec 7(1)	6–3
Petro de Luanda	96–65; 21 Feb 7(2)	124–42; 31 Jan 1(2)	73–69; 22 Nov 3(1)		0–20; 16 Nov 2(1)	91–70; 23 Nov 4(1)	102–83; 22 Feb 8(2)	95–55; 28 Feb 9(1)	86–70; 15 Feb 6(2)	99–70; 14 Feb 5(2)	8–1
Primeiro de Agosto	69–55; 22 Feb 8(2)	138–40; 07 Feb 3(2)	79–32; 23 Nov 4(1)	94–88; 08 Feb 2(2)		70–42; 14 Feb 5(2)	75–83; 28 Feb 9(2)	87–57; 24 Jan 1(1)	85–57; 06 Dec 7(1)	107–38; 30 Nov 6(1)	8–1
Progresso	20–0; 15 Nov 1(1)	91–53; 21 Feb 7(2)	89–85; 15 Feb 6(2)	62–92; 25 Feb 4(2)	50–80; 5(1)		72–100; 16 Nov 2(1)	65–72; 07 Feb 3(2)	57–69; 9(1)	53–80; 07 Dec 8(1)	4–5
Recreativo do Libolo	94–81; 14 Feb 5(2)	– 29 Feb 6(1)	20–0; 15 Nov 1(1)	76–67; 30 Jan 8(1)	94–89; 11 Jan 9(1)	– 2(2)		98–71; 15 Feb 7(2)	– 08 Feb 4(2)	82–44; 22 Nov 3(1)	9–0
Sporting de Benguela	87–82; 21 Dec 6(2)	– 8(1)	65–85; 01 Feb 2(1)	58–95; 29 Feb 9(2)	37–98; 25 Jan 1(2)	71–63; 17 Jan 3(1)	54–73; 14 Jan 7(1)		– 5(1)	65–64; 18 Jan 4(1)	3–6
Universidade Lusíada	66–90; 22 Nov 3(1)	108–40; 02 Feb 2(2)	50–74; 22 Feb 8(2)	74–92; 6(1)	55–87; 21 Feb 7(2)	62-69; 28 Feb 9(2)	– 23 Nov 4(1)	– 14 Feb 5(2)		- 1(1)	4–5
Vila Clotilde	20–0; 16 Nov 2(1)	– 28 Feb 9(2)	67–78; 21 Feb 7(2)	55–86; 5(1)	– 15 Feb 6(2)	87–81; 22 Feb 8(2)	54–92; 07 Feb 3(2)	68–78; 08 Feb 4(2)	51–44; 1(2)		4–5
Record	2–7	0–9	5–4	7–2	8-1	2-7	8–1	3–6	3–6	2–7	

=== Regular season standings ===
Qualified for the Group A
Relegated to the Group B

Pos	Team	Pts
1	Recreativo do Libolo	35
2	Primeiro de Agosto	34
3	Petro de Luanda	33
4	Interclube	28
5	Universidade Lusíada	25
6	Sporting de Benguela	24
7	Vila Clotilde	24
8	ASA	23
9	Progresso	20
10	Amigos de viana	18

== Group Stage (March 14 - April 12, 2014) ==
=== Group A ===
	INT	PET	PRI	LIB	LUS	Rec.
Interclube		101–71; 04 Apr 1(2)	55–70; 21 Mar 4(1)	104–90; 05 Apr 3(2)	67–56; 22 Mar 5(1)	3–1
Petro de Luanda	81–78; 14 Mar 1(1)		82–83; 05 Apr 3(2)	74–96; 22 Mar 5(1)	113–73; 08 Apr 2(2)	2–2
Primeiro de Agosto	81–77; 11 Apr 4(2)	81–78; 15 Mar 3(1)		88–86; 08 Apr 2(2)	81–61; 14 Mar 1(1)	4–0
Recreativo do Libolo	77–70; 15 Mar 3(1)	87–79; 12 Apr 5(2)	78–69; 18 Mar 2(1)		– 11 Apr 4(2)	4–0
Universidade Lusíada	60–75; 12 Apr 5(2)	79–100; 18 Mar 2(1)	51–75; 04 Apr 1(2)	71–79; 21 Mar 4(1)		0–4
Record	1–3	1–3	3–1	2–2	0–4	

=== Group stage standings (A) ===
Qualified for the Final Four
Relegated to the 5–8th classification

Pos	Team	Pts
1	Primeiro de Agosto	16
2	Recreativo do Libolo	15
3	Interclube	12
4	Petro de Luanda	11
5	Universidade Lusíada	8

=== Group B ===
	ASA	CAV	PRO	SCB	VIL	Rec.
ASA		111–56; 08 Apr 2(2)	78–69; 14 Mar 1(1)	65–55; 22 Mar 5(1)	78–60; 05 Apr 3(2)	4–0
Clube Amigos de Viana	46–123; 18 Mar 2(1)		54–128; 12 Apr 5(2)	44–88; 21 Mar 4(1)	60–122; 04 Apr 1(2)	0–4
Progresso	84–62; 04 Apr 1(2)	107–56; 22 Mar 5(1)		61–66; 05 Apr 3(2)	70–79; 21 Mar 4(1)	2–2
Sporting de Benguela	85–79; 12 Apr 5(2)	– 11 Apr 4(2)	66–54; 15 Mar 3(1)		61–70; 18 Mar 2(1)	3–1
Vila Clotilde	80–70; 15 Mar 3(1)	20–0; 14 Mar 1(1)	67–70; 11 Apr 4(2)	79–86; 08 Apr 2(2)		2–2
Record	1–3	0–4	2–2	3–1	3–1	

=== Group stage standings (B) ===
Qualified for the 5–8th classification
Relegated to the second division

Pos	Team	Pts
1	Sporting de Benguela	14
2	ASA	13
3	Vila Clotilde	12
4	Progresso	12
5	Amigos de Viana	8

== 5–8th Classification (April 22 - May 22, 2014) ==
	ASA	SCB	LUS	VIL	Rec.
ASA		0–20; 03 May	– 06 May		
Sporting de Benguela	20–0; 02 May			– 17 May	
Universidade Lusíada	69–62; 22 Apr	– 26 Apr		– 29 Apr	
Vila Clotilde	72–70; 26 Apr	– 18 May			
Record					

=== 5–8th Classification standings (After 3 rounds) ===
Pos	Team	Pld	W	L	PF	PA	Diff	Pts
5	Vila Clotilde	1	1	0	72	70	+2	2
6	Sporting de Benguela	1	1	0				2
7	ASA	2	0	2	132	141	-9	2
8	Universidade Lusíada	2	1	1	69	62	+7	3

== Final Four (April 24 - May 22, 2014) ==
	INT		PET		PRI		LIB		Rec.
Interclube			67–106; 24 Apr	90–95; 10 May	78–101; 03 May	70–83; 20 May	63–93; 29 Apr	78–84; 08 May	0–6
Petro de Luanda	84–87; 01 May	90–82; 17 May			98–95; 08 May	85–86; 15 May	88–105; 26 Apr	90–121; 13 May	2–4
Primeiro de Agosto	101–87; 26 Apr	89–69; 13 May	99–74; 29 Apr	100–90; 22 May			90–87; 01 May	77–78; 17 May	5–1
Recreativo do Libolo	79–76; 08 May	85–79; 22 May	100–92; 03 May	84–101; 20 May	88–85; 24 Apr	87–73; 10 May			5–1
Record	1–5		3–3		3–3		5–1		

=== Final four standings (After 12 rounds) ===
Pos	Team	Pld	W	L	PF	PA	Diff	Pts
1	Recreativo do Libolo	12	10	2	1101	1022	+99	22
2	Primeiro de Agosto	12	8	4	1074	991	+83	20
3	Petro de Luanda	12	5	7	1092	1112	-20	17
4	Interclube	12	1	11	957	1099	-162	13

2014 Bic Basket
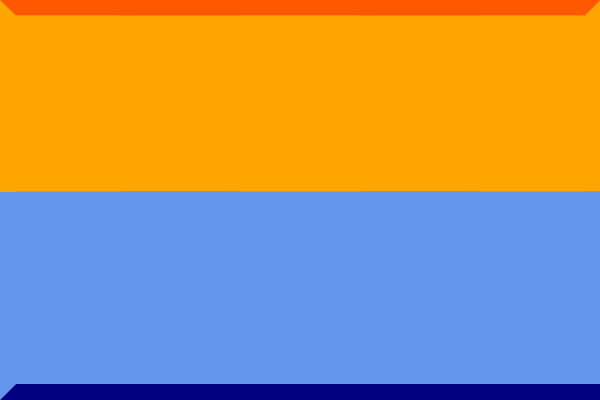
Clube Recreativo Desportivo do Libolo
2nd title

Most Valuable Player
(Angola) Eduardo Mingas

== See also ==
- BAI Basket
- 2013 2nd Division Basketball
- BAI Basket Past Seasons
- Federação Angolana de Basketball
