= Progresso Associação do Sambizanga (basketball) =

- Leagues: Angola League
- Founded: November 17, 1975; 49 years ago
- Folded: 2017
- History: Progresso Associação do Sambizanga; 1975–2017
- Arena: Pavilhão 28 de Fevereiro
- Capacity: 2,000
- Location: Luanda, Angola
- Team colors: yellow, black
- President: Paixão Júnior

Progresso Associação do Sambizanga, also known as PAS, was a basketball club from Luanda, Angola. The basketball team competed in the top flight Angolan League, as well as other local competitions organized by the Angolan Basketball Federation.

After being relegated to the second division in the previous year, Progresso won the 2014 Angola Second Division Basketball Championship, thus being promoted to the 2015 BIC Basket

In 2017, the basketball team ceased operations.

== Honours ==
Angola Second Division

- Champions (2): 2014, 2016

== Players ==
Progresso do Sambizanga Basketball players 2014–2017

Nat	Name	A	P	H	W	Cláudio Dikani			A.B.
Nat	Name	A	P	H	W	2014	2015	2016	2017
Nat	Name	A	P	H	W	6	–	–	–
(Angola)	Adalberto António	28	⋅	⋅		⋅	⋅	–	⋅
(Angola)	Adilson Santos	30	SG	⋅		⋅	⋅	→	11
(Angola)	Afonso Rodrigues	35	PF	⋅		⋅	⋅	→	13
(Angola)	Alberto Costa	⋅	⋅	⋅		⋅	13	⋅	⋅
(Angola)	André João	22	SG	⋅		⋅	14	14	⋅
(Angola)	António Neto	27	⋅	⋅		⋅	9	⋅	⋅
(Angola)	Augusto Sangunga	⋅	⋅	⋅		–	⋅	⋅	⋅
(Angola)	Benvindo Quimbamba	29	⋅	⋅		–	→	⋅	⋅
(Angola)	Cardoso Casimiro	38	⋅	⋅		⋅	→	15	⋅
(Angola)	Edgar Chocolate	28	⋅	⋅		–	4	4	⋅
(Angola)	Edson do Rosário	35	SF	1.93	–	⋅	⋅	→	12
(Angola)	Edson Hilukilwa	24	SF			–	⋅	⋅	⋅
(Angola)	Edson Santos	⋅	⋅	⋅		⋅	⋅	⋅	–
(Angola)	Eduardo Kiabola	22	⋅	⋅		⋅	→	10	–
(Angola)	Egídio Ventura	24	⋅	⋅		–	⋅	⋅	⋅
(Angola)	Eric Norman	32	⋅	⋅		⋅	⋅	→	18
(Angola)	Escórcio António	27	⋅	⋅		–	⋅	⋅	⋅
(Angola)	Fonseca Justino	⋅	⋅	⋅		⋅	⋅	⋅	–
(Angola)	Francisco Destino	⋅	⋅	⋅		⋅	⋅	⋅	14
(Angola)	Gilson Martins	25	⋅	⋅		⋅	⋅	→	4
(Angola)	Hélder Cristina	24	⋅	⋅		–	⋅	⋅	⋅
(Angola)	Hélder Gonçalves	⋅	C	⋅		⋅	7	⋅	⋅
(Angola)	Hélio Francisco	30	G	⋅		–	11	11	⋅
(Angola)	Hugo Cristiano	33	SG	⋅		⋅	⋅	7	7
(Angola)	Joaquim Costa	29	⋅	⋅		⋅	⋅	→	20
(Angola)	Joaquim Xavier	35	⋅	⋅		⋅	⋅	8	⋅
(Angola)	Joel Domingos		⋅	⋅		–	⋅	⋅	⋅
(Angola)	José António	27	PG	⋅		⋅	⋅	→	5
(Angola)	José Fula	27	⋅	⋅	⋅	–	12	⋅	⋅
(Angola)	José Salvador	⋅	⋅	⋅		–	⋅	⋅	⋅
(Angola)	Josemar de Carvalho	27	SF	1.96		⋅	⋅	→	3
(Angola)	Joseney Joaquim	22	⋅	⋅		–	⋅	⋅	⋅
(Angola)	Juliano Domingos	⋅	C	⋅		–	20	⋅	⋅
(Angola)	Kiamesso Koko	⋅	⋅	⋅		–	10	⋅	⋅
(Angola)	Manuel Mariano	29	⋅	⋅		⋅	⋅	12	⋅
(Angola)	Manuel Nowa	25	⋅	⋅	⋅	–	3	⋅	⋅
(Angola)	Márcio Mário	24	⋅	⋅	⋅	–	6	13	⋅
(Angola)	Martinho Paulo	28	⋅	⋅		⋅	⋅	20	⋅
(Angola)	Miguel Maconda	⋅	⋅	⋅		–	8	⋅	⋅
(Democratic Republic of the Congo)	Mwamba Ilunga	32	C	2.01		→	15	–	15
(Angola)	Olêncio Ndatipo	30	⋅	⋅		⋅	→	6	6
(Angola)	Pedro Miguel	22	⋅	⋅		–	5	5	⋅
(Angola)	Romenigue Sambo	29	PG	⋅		⋅	⋅	→	8
(Cape Verde) (Guinea)	Sékou Ba Condé	28	C	1.95	95	⋅	⋅	→	16
(Angola)	Valter Santos	22	⋅	⋅		⋅	⋅	9	⋅
(Angola)	Vladimir Pontes	33	SF	⋅		⋅	⋅	→	9
(Angola)	Yubi Major	29	⋅	⋅		–	16	16	⋅

== See also ==
- Progresso do Sambizanga Football
- Progresso do Sambizanga Handball
- Angolan Basketball Federation
