= Sporting Clube de Benguela (basketball) =

- Leagues: Angola League
- Founded: November 16, 1915; 109 years ago
- Dissolved: 2017
- History: Sporting Clube de Benguela; 1915–2017
- Arena: Pavilhão Joaquim Araújo (capacity: 2,000)
- Location: Benguela, Angola
- Team colors: Green, White
- President: Carlos Cardoso
- Head coach: Nuno Lopes (M); Hilário Filipe (W)

Sporting Clube de Benguela, in short Sporting de Benguela, was a basketball club from Angola. The club, based in the city of Benguela, the capital of the namesake province, was founded on November 16, 1915, as the 21st affiliate of Sporting Clube de Portugal.

The club's men's basketball team made its debut in the Angolan top tier basketball league (BAI Basket) in 2013, after winning the 2013 Angolan Second Division championship. They went on to participate in 2014, 2015 and 2016.

In 2017, the basketball team withdrew from official competitions for financial reasons.

== Players ==
Sporting Clube de Benguela Basketball players

=== 2014–2016 ===
Nat	#	Name	A	P	H	W	E.T.	N. Lopes		–
Nat	#	Name	A	P	H	W	2014	2015	2016	2017
Nat	#	Name	A	P	H	W	7th	6th	–	–
(Cape Verde)	⋅	Admir Mendes	28	SG	1.85		9	⋅	15	⋅
(Angola)	⋅	Afonso Rodrigues	34	F	⋅		13	13	13	→
(Angola)	⋅	Anderson Baptista		⋅	⋅		23	23	⋅	⋅
(Angola)	⋅	Anderson Mestre	25	⋅	⋅		⋅	⋅	–	⋅
(Angola)	⋅	António Deográcio	26	PG	⋅		22	22	22	→
(Angola)	⋅	Bento Gamba	22	PG	⋅		5	5	5	⋅
(Angola)	⋅	Bruno Neves	20	⋅	⋅		⋅	9	–	⋅
(Angola)	⋅	Estévão Cunha		⋅	⋅		⋅	18	⋅	⋅
(Angola)	⋅	Henrique Bado	31	⋅	⋅		⋅	⋅	4	⋅
(Angola)	⋅	Joao Gomes	29	⋅	⋅		7	⋅	7	⋅
(Angola)	⋅	Joao Neto	20	⋅	⋅		⋅	⋅	14	⋅
(Angola)	⋅	Josemar de Carvalho	26	PF	1.96		8	8	8	→
(Angola)	⋅	Luís Almeida		⋅	⋅		33	⋅	⋅	⋅
(Angola)	⋅	Kelson Quengue	29	⋅	⋅		⋅	⋅	9	⋅
(Angola)	⋅	Manda João	21	SF	⋅		14	→	⋅	⋅
(Angola)	⋅	Marcos Baptista		⋅	⋅		⋅	35	⋅	⋅
(Angola)	⋅	Moreno Araújo	24	⋅	⋅		⋅	⋅	–	⋅
(Angola)	⋅	Paulo Chimbamba	25	⋅	⋅		⋅	24	24	⋅
(Angola)	⋅	Paulo Papi	36	⋅	⋅		⋅	12	12	⋅
(Cape Verde) (Guinea)	⋅	Sékou Ba Condé	27	C	1.95	95	10	10	10	→
(Angola)	⋅	Valdemar Lopes	28	SF	⋅		15	15	20	⋅

== See also ==
- Sporting de Benguela Football
