= Atlético Sport Aviação (basketball) =

ASA
- Nickname: Os Aviadores (The Aviators)
- Leagues: Angolan Basketball League
- Founded: 1 April 1953; 72 years ago
- Arena: Pavilhão da Cidadela; Pavilhão Anexo da Cidadela
- Capacity: 7,500
- Location: Luanda, Angola
- President: José Luís Prata
- Head coach: Carlos Dinis
- Championships: 3× Angola League; 2× Angola Cup; 3× Angola Super Cup
Home	Away

Atlético Sport Aviação, commonly known as ASA, is a basketball club from Luanda, Angola. The club's men's team competes at the local level, at the Luanda Provincial Basketball Championship and in the Angolan Basketball League.

In its history, ASA has been present as well as at the continental level, at the annual African Basketball Club Champions League competitions.

In recent years, financial difficulties have troubled the club. In October 2023, ASA was disqualified from the Provincial Basketball League.

== Honours ==
Honours		No.	Years
Leagues
Angolan Basketball League	Winner	3	1980, 1996, 1997
Angolan Basketball League	Runner-up	N/A	N/A
Cups
Angola Cup	Winner	2	1993, 1999
Angola Cup	Runner-up	1	2000
Wlademiro Romero Super Cup	Winner	3	1998, 1999, 2000
Wlademiro Romero Super Cup	Runner-up	1	2009
Victorino Cunha Cup	Winner	0	
Victorino Cunha Cup	Runner-up	0	
FIBA Africa Club Competitions
African Club Champions	Winner	0	
African Club Champions	Runner-up	0	
International Tournaments
Supertaça Compal	Winner	0	
Supertaça Compal	Runner-up	0	

== Roster ==
Note: Flags indicate national team eligibility at FIBA-sanctioned events. Players may hold other non-FIBA nationalities not displayed.

ASA Basketball roster
Players
Coaches

Pos.	No.	Nat.	Name	Ht.	Wt.	Age
PG	2	(Angola)	Emanuel António			44 – 17 November 1981
SG	4	(Angola)	Ramalho Lemos			38 – 16 January 1988
	5	(Angola)	Escórcio António			38 – 12 December 1987
PG	6	(Angola)	Walter Tadeu	1.78 m (5 ft 10 in)	79 kg (174 lb)	35 – 13 May 1990
PF	7	(Angola)	Vasco Estevão			40 – 2 November 1985
SF	8	(Angola)	Sebastião Quicuambi	1.96 m (6 ft 5 in)		37 – 17 August 1988
SF	9	(Angola)	Mayzer Alexandre	1.84 m (6 ft 0 in)		41 – 29 June 1984
PG	10	(Angola)	Simão Lutonda			29 – 10 March 1996
F	11	(Angola)	Glofate Buiamba	1.95 m (6 ft 5 in)		27 – 5 January 1999
SG	12	(Angola)	António Neto			37 – 8 August 1988
SF	13	(Angola)	Eduardo Ferreira	1.89 m (6 ft 2 in)	90 kg (198 lb)	35 – 10 July 1990
	15	(Angola)	Moisés César	2.00 m (6 ft 7 in)		28 – 7 April 1997
	40	(Angola)	Garcia Destino			42 – 15 January 1984

Head coach

- (Angola) Carlos Dinis

Assistant coach(es)

- (Angola) Cesaltino Reis
- (Angola) Jacinto Olim Jabila

Legend

- (C) Team captain
- (I) Import player
- Injured

Updated as of November 25th, 2016

=== Depth chart ===
Pos.	Starting 5	Bench 1	Bench 2
C	Vasco Estevão
PF	Sebastião Quicuambi
SF	Mayzer Alexandre	Eduardo Ferreira
SG	Ramalho Lemos	António Neto
PG	Simão Lutonda	Walter Tadeu	Emanuel António

== Staff ==
(Angola)	Carlos Dinis	Head coach (2004 -
(Angola)	Jacinto Olim Jabila	Assistant coach
(Angola)	Cesaltino Reis	Assistant coach

== Former managers ==
(Angola)	António da Luz (2001)
(Angola)	Nuno Teixeira

== Former notable players ==
(Angola)	Edmar Barros	PG
(Angola)	Nelson Sardinha	F/C
(Angola)	Jacinto Olim Jabila	SF

== Players ==
ASA Basketball players

=== 2011-2018 ===
Atlético Sport Aviação Basketball players 2011–2018
Nat	#	Name	A	P	H	W	Carlos Dinis							
Nat	#	Name	A	P	H	W	2011	2012	2013	2014	2015	2016	2017	2018
Nat	#	Name	A	P	H	W	5th	5th	6th	7th	4th	7th	–	–
(United States)	⋅	Aaron Martin	25	⋅	1.96	93	⋅	⋅	⋅	⋅	10	⋅	⋅	⋅
(Cape Verde)	⋅	Abdulay Faty	31	C	2.05		⋅	⋅	⋅	⋅	⋅	–	⋅	⋅
(Angola)	⋅	Adilson Baza	29	PG	1.85		⋅	⋅	⋅	⋅	11	⋅	⋅	⋅
(Angola)	⋅	Adolfo Quimbamba	31	SF	1.97	104	⋅	⋅	2013	⋅	⋅	⋅	⋅	⋅
(Angola)	⋅	Afonso Rodrigues	31	F			⋅	2012	2013	⋅	⋅	⋅	⋅	⋅
(Angola)	13	Aldemiro João	⋅	C	2.08	⋅	⋅	⋅	⋅	⋅	⋅	⋅	⋅	2018
(Angola)	2	António Neto	30	SG			⋅	⋅	⋅	⋅	⋅	12	12	2018
(Angola)	6	Bráulio Morais	28	PG	1.85	90	⋅	⋅	⋅	⋅	⋅	⋅	→	2018
(Angola)	⋅	Brunelle Tutonda	27	⋅	2.00		⋅	⋅	⋅	⋅	⋅	–	⋅	⋅
(Angola)	⋅	Bruno Balanga	19	PG			⋅	⋅	⋅	⋅	⋅	23	⋅	⋅
(Angola)	⋅	Carlos Cabral	20	SG	1.85	95	⋅	⋅	⋅	⋅	16	⋅	⋅	⋅
(United States)	4	Curtis Allen	⋅	⋅	⋅		⋅	⋅	⋅	⋅	⋅	⋅	⋅	2018
(Angola)	23	Délcio Ucuahamba	26	SF	1.94	92	⋅	⋅	⋅	⋅	⋅	→	–	2018
(United States)	14	Donald Singleton	31	C	2.13	116	⋅	⋅	⋅	⋅	⋅	⋅	⋅	2018
(Angola)	⋅	Edson do Rosário	34	PF	1.93		⋅	⋅	⋅	⋅	⋅	6	→	⋅
(Angola)	7	Eduardo Ferreira	28	SF	1.89	90	⋅	2012	2013	7	⋅	13	13	2018
(Angola)	⋅	Egídio Ventura	25	⋅			⋅	⋅	⋅	⋅	13	⋅	⋅	⋅
(Angola)	8	Elmer Félix	29	⋅	1.80	80	⋅	⋅	⋅	⋅	⋅	⋅	→	2018
(Angola)	⋅	Emanuel António	27	PG			⋅	2012	2013	8	⋅	⋅	2	⋅
(Angola)	⋅	Eric Norman	31	⋅	1.90		⋅	⋅	⋅	⋅	⋅	–	→	⋅
(Angola)	⋅	Escórcio António	29	⋅			⋅	⋅	⋅	⋅	⋅	→	5	⋅
(Angola)	16	Felix Gonzalez	⋅	⋅	⋅	⋅	⋅	⋅	⋅	⋅	⋅	⋅	⋅	2018
(Angola)	⋅	Fernando Albano	38	⋅			⋅	2012	2013	⋅	⋅	⋅	⋅	⋅
(Angola)	⋅	Filipe Abraão	37	SF	1.84	88	⋅	⋅	⋅	⋅	⋅	11	⋅	⋅
(Angola)	⋅	Francisco Horácio		⋅			⋅	2012	⋅	⋅	⋅	⋅	⋅	⋅
(Angola)	⋅	Garcia Destino	33	⋅			⋅	⋅	⋅	⋅	⋅	→	40	⋅
(Angola)	9	Glofate Buiamba	19	F	1.88		⋅	⋅	⋅	⋅	⋅	→	11	2018
(Angola)	12	Hélder Fernandes	⋅	G	⋅	⋅	⋅	⋅	⋅	⋅	⋅	⋅	⋅	2018
(Angola)	⋅	Hélder Gonçalves	25	⋅	⋅	⋅	⋅	⋅	⋅	–	⋅	⋅	⋅	⋅
(Angola)	⋅	Henrique Bado	30	C			⋅	⋅	⋅	4	4	⋅	⋅	⋅
(Angola)	⋅	João Filho	21	⋅			⋅	2012	2013	⋅	⋅	⋅	⋅	⋅
(Angola)	⋅	Joaquim da Mata		SF			⋅	⋅	2013	⋅	⋅	⋅	⋅	⋅
(Cape Verde)	⋅	Joel Almeida		⋅			⋅	2012	⋅	⋅	⋅	⋅	⋅	⋅
(Angola)	⋅	Jone Pedro	24	C			⋅	⋅	⋅	–	⋅	⋅	⋅	⋅
(Angola)	10	Levi Mouélé	27	G			⋅	⋅	⋅	⋅	⋅	⋅	⋅	2018
(Angola)	⋅	Manuel Mariano		F			⋅	⋅	⋅	5	5	⋅	⋅	⋅
(Cape Verde)	⋅	Mario Correia	35	SG	1.88	84	⋅	⋅	2013	⋅	⋅	⋅	⋅	⋅
(Angola)	⋅	Mayzer Alexandre	32	F	1.84		⋅	⋅	→	9	9	9	9	⋅
(Angola)	⋅	Moisés César	20	⋅	2.00		⋅	⋅	⋅	⋅	⋅	15	15	⋅
(Angola)	3	Olêncio Ndatipo	32	⋅	⋅		⋅	⋅	⋅	⋅	⋅	⋅	→	2018
(Angola)	⋅	Osvaldo Vieira	31	PG			⋅	⋅	⋅	⋅	⋅	5	⋅	⋅
(Angola)	⋅	Ramalho Lemos	29	C			⋅	⋅	⋅	⋅	⋅	→	4	⋅
(Cape Verde)	⋅	Rodrigo Mascarenhas		⋅			⋅	2012	⋅	⋅	⋅	⋅	⋅	⋅
(Angola)	⋅	Sebastião Quicuame	29	⋅	1.96		⋅	⋅	⋅	⋅	8	8	8	→
(Angola)	1	Simão Lutonda	22	SG			⋅	⋅	⋅	⋅	⋅	20	1	2018
(Angola)	25	Vasco Estevão	33	PF			⋅	2012	⋅	17	7	7	7	2018
(Angola)	⋅	Victor Muzadi	35	C	2.01		⋅	2012	2013	⋅	⋅	⋅	⋅	⋅
(Angola)	⋅	Vladimir Ricardino	38	⋅	1.98		⋅	⋅	⋅	⋅	→	10	→	⋅
(Angola)	⋅	Walter Tadeu	27	PG	1.78	79	⋅	⋅	⋅	⋅	⋅	→	6	→
(Angola)	⋅	Wilson da Mata	35	C			⋅	2012	2013	⋅	⋅	4	⋅	⋅
(Angola)	⋅	Wilson de Carvalho	35	⋅			⋅	2012	2013	10	⋅	⋅	⋅	⋅
(Angola)	⋅	Wilson João	28	⋅	1.78	75	⋅	⋅	⋅	⋅	6	⋅	⋅	⋅
(Angola)	⋅	Yuri Suingue	28	⋅			⋅	⋅	⋅	12	12	⋅	⋅	⋅
(Angola)	18	Zola Paulo	30	C	2.02	118	⋅	⋅	⋅	15	15	⋅	⋅	2018

=== 1991–2000 ===
Atlético Sport Aviação basketball players 1991–2000
Nat	Name	A	P	H	W	–	–	–	–	–	–	–	N.T.	–	–
Nat	Name	A	P	H	W	1991	1992	1993	1994	1995	1996	1997	1998	1999	2000
Nat	Name	A	P	H	W	–	–	–	–	–	–	–	–	–	–
(Angola)	Carlos Mendes	⋅	⋅	⋅	⋅	⋅	⋅	⋅	⋅	⋅	⋅	⋅	1998	⋅	⋅
(Angola)	Fernando Albano	23	⋅	⋅	⋅	⋅	⋅	⋅	⋅	⋅	⋅	⋅	1998	⋅	⋅
(Angola)	Geraldo Tondela	21	⋅	⋅	⋅	⋅	⋅	⋅	⋅	⋅	⋅	⋅	1998	⋅	⋅
(Angola)	Jacinto Olim Jabila	⋅	⋅	⋅	⋅	⋅	⋅	⋅	⋅	⋅	⋅	⋅	1998	⋅	⋅
(Angola)	João Filho	⋅	⋅	⋅	⋅	⋅	⋅	⋅	⋅	⋅	⋅	⋅	1998	⋅	⋅
(Angola)	José Nascimento	20	⋅	⋅	⋅	⋅	⋅	⋅	⋅	⋅	⋅	⋅	1998	⋅	⋅
(Angola)	José Santos	⋅	⋅	⋅	⋅	⋅	⋅	⋅	⋅	⋅	⋅	⋅	1998	⋅	⋅
(Angola)	Manuel Martins Massunga	25	⋅	⋅	⋅	⋅	⋅	⋅	⋅	⋅	⋅	⋅	1998	⋅	⋅
(Angola)	Pedro António	⋅	⋅	⋅	⋅	⋅	⋅	⋅	⋅	⋅	⋅	⋅	1998	⋅	⋅
(Angola)	Simão Panzo	21	⋅	⋅	⋅	⋅	⋅	⋅	⋅	⋅	⋅	⋅	1998	⋅	⋅
(Angola)	Vicente Neto	22	⋅	⋅	⋅	⋅	⋅	⋅	⋅	⋅	⋅	⋅	1998	⋅	⋅
(Angola)	Walter Costa	25	PG	⋅	⋅	⋅	⋅	⋅	⋅	⋅	⋅	⋅	1998	⋅	⋅

# = Angola league winner

== See also ==
- ASA Football
- ASA Handball
- BIC Basket
- Federação Angolana de Basquetebol
