= Bráulio Morais =

Angolan basketball player (born 1990)

Personal information
- Born: December 17, 1990 (age 35) Luanda, Angola
- Listed height: 190 cm (6.2 ft)
- Listed weight: 88 kg (194 lb)

Career information
- Playing career: 2010–2019
- Position: Point guard

Career history
- 2010–2013: Petro Atlético
- 2013–2016: Recreativo do Libolo
- 2016–2018: Primeiro de Agosto
- 2018–2019: ASA
Medals
Men's basketball
Representing Angola
AfroBasket
Silver medal – second place	Radès 2015	National Team
FIBA Africa Under-18 Championship
Silver medal – second place	Alexandria 2008	National Team
FIBA Africa Clubs Champions Cup
Silver medal – second place	Malabo 2012	Petro Atlético
Silver medal – second place	Luanda 2015	Rec do Libolo
Bronze medal – third place	Sousse 2013	Rec do Libolo

Bráulio Edgar Alcântara Morais, born December 17, 1990, in Luanda, is an Angolan professional basketball player. Bráulio, who stands at 190 cm (6 ft 3 in), plays as a point guard. Bráulio is a brother of Petro Atlético player Carlos Morais.

He last played for Angolan side ASA at the Angolan basketball league BIC Basket.
