= Luís Costa (basketball) =

Angolan basketball player (born 1978)

Personal information
- Born: June 7, 1978 (age 48) Benguela, Angola
- Listed height: 193 cm (6.33 ft)
- Listed weight: 93 kg (205 lb)
- Position: Small forward

Career history
- –: Sporting de Benguela
- 1998–2003: Oliveirense
- 2003–2005: Belenenses
- 2005–2008: Petro Atlético
- 2008–2015: Recreativo do Libolo

Luís Miguel Fastudo e Costa (born 7 June 1978 in Benguela) is a former Angolan professional basketball player. He played for C.R.D. Libolo at the Angolan major basketball league BIC Basket until 2015. He is a former member of the Angola national basketball team. He is 6 ft 4 in (1.93 m) in height and 93 kg (205 pounds) in weight. He represented Angola at the 2006 FIBA World Championship, the FIBA Africa Championship 2007 and the 2008 Summer Olympics.
