= Jason Cain =

American basketball player (born 1985)

Jason Edward Cain
Petro de Luanda
- Position: Power forward / center
- League: Angolan Basketball League

Personal information
- Born: March 31, 1985 (age 41) Philadelphia, Pennsylvania
- Listed height: 6 ft 10 in (2.08 m)
- Listed weight: 224 lb (102 kg)

Career information
- High school: West Catholic High School (Philadelphia, Pennsylvania)
- College: Virginia (2003–2007)
- NBA draft: 2007: undrafted
- Playing career: 2007–present

Career history
- 2007–2011: Phantoms Braunschweig
- 2011–2012: Eisbären Bremerhaven
- 2012–2013: Bayreuth
- 2013–2014: Coruña
- 2014–2016: Petro de Luanda
- 2016–2017: Marín Peixegalego
- 2017–2018: Amics Castelló
- 2019–present: Petro de Luanda
Medals
Men's basketball
Representing Angola
FIBA Africa Clubs Champions Cup
Gold medal – first place	Luanda 2015	Petro Atlético

Jason Edward Cain (born March 31, 1985) is a professional basketball player who currently plays for Petro de Luanda in the Angolan Basketball League. Standing at 6 ft 10 in (2.08 m), he plays as power forward.

== Career ==
Formerly, he played in the University of Virginia Cavaliers, mostly playing significant minutes during his third and fourth years. Cain helped the Virginia team in reach the NCAA tournament in the 2006–07 season.

In 2008, Cain started his professional career by playing for the New Yorker Phantoms Braunschweig in the German Basketball Bundesliga (BBL).

In 2014, Cain signed with Petro de Luanda from Angola and went on to win the 2015 FIBA Africa Clubs Champions Cup with the club.

In September, Petro de Luanda announced Cain was returning to the team.
