= Valdelício Joaquim =

Angolan basketball player (born 1990)

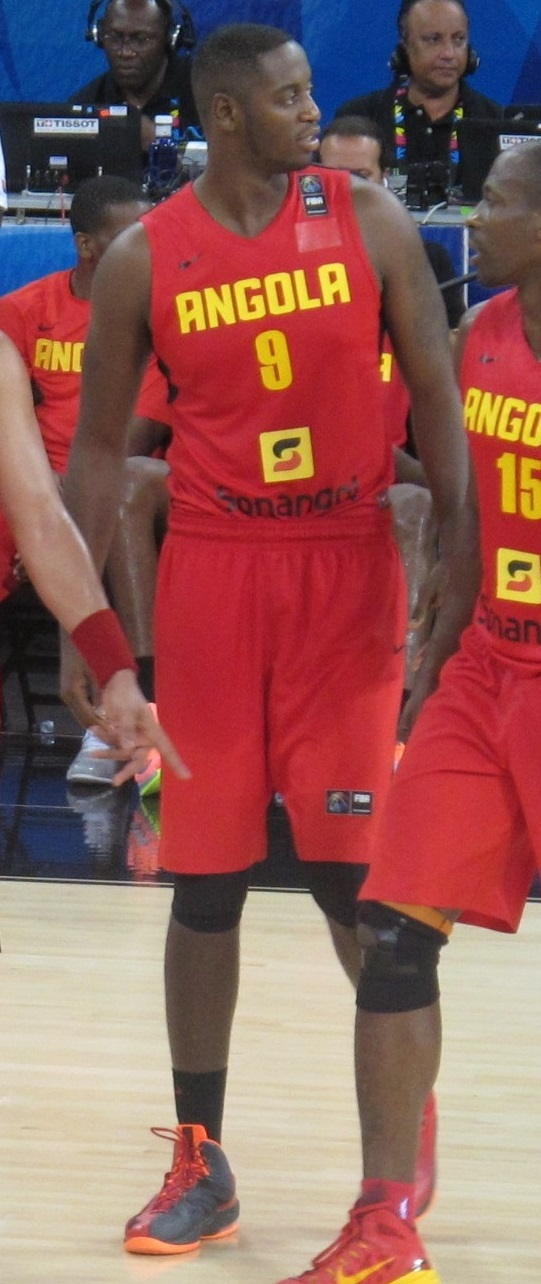
- Joaquim in 2014

Interclube
- Position: Center
- League: Angolan Basketball League

Personal information
- Born: 15 April 1990 (age 36) Luanda, Angola
- Listed height: 2.09 m (6 ft 10 in)
- Listed weight: 108 kg (238 lb)

Career information
- High school: Christian (El Cajon, California)
- College: USU Eastern (2009–2010); Hawaii (2010–2013)
- NBA draft: 2013: undrafted
- Playing career: 2013–present

Career history
- 2005–2007, 2013–2014: Petro de Luanda
- 2014–2017: Recreativo do Libolo
- 2017–2018: Obras Sanitarias
- 2018: STB Le Havre
- 2018–2019: UJAP Quimper 29
- 2019–2022: Petro de Luanda
- 2022–present: Interclube

Career highlights
- 5× Angolan League champion (2006, 2007, 2017, 2021, 2022); 6× Angolan Cup winner (2007, 2014, 2015–2017, 2022); FIBA Africa Champions Cup champion (2006); First-team All-WAC (2012)
Medals
Men's basketball
Representing Angola
AfroBasket
Gold medal – first place	Abidjan 2013	National Team
Silver medal – second place	Antananarivo 2011	National Team
Silver medal – second place	Radès 2015	National Team
FIBA Africa Clubs Champions Cup
Gold medal – first place	Tunis 2014	Rec do Libolo
Silver medal – second place	Luanda 2015	Rec do Libolo

Valdelício Macanga Maia Joaquim, nicknamed Vander, (born April 15, 1990), is an Angolan basketball player for Interclube. Valdelício, a 6 ft 9 in (2.09 m) tall center, has competed for the Angola national team at the AfroBasket in 2011 and 2013.

From 2009 to 2013, Vander played college basketball for the USU Eastern and the Hawaii Rainbow Warriors. Afterwards, Vander played the majority of his professional career in his native Angola, for various teams including Petro de Luanda, Primeiro de Agosto and Interclube. He also had short stints in Argentina and France.

== BAL career statistics ==
Legend
GP	Games played	GS	Games started	MPG	Minutes per game
FG%	Field goal percentage	3P%	3-point field goal percentage	FT%	Free throw percentage
RPG	Rebounds per game	APG	Assists per game	SPG	Steals per game
BPG	Blocks per game	PPG	Points per game	**Bold**	Career high

Year	Team	GP	GS	MPG	FG%	3P%	FT%	RPG	APG	SPG	BPG	PPG
2021	Petro de Luanda	**6**	**5**	**18.8**	**.556**	**.579**	**.800**	3.7	**.8**	.5	.3	**9.2**
2022	Petro de Luanda	5	0	13.3	.345	.267	–	**4.4**	.4	**.6**	**.6**	4.8
Career		11	5	16.3	.460	.437	.800	4.0	.6	.5	.4	7.2
