= Pavilhão Dream Space =

Sports arena

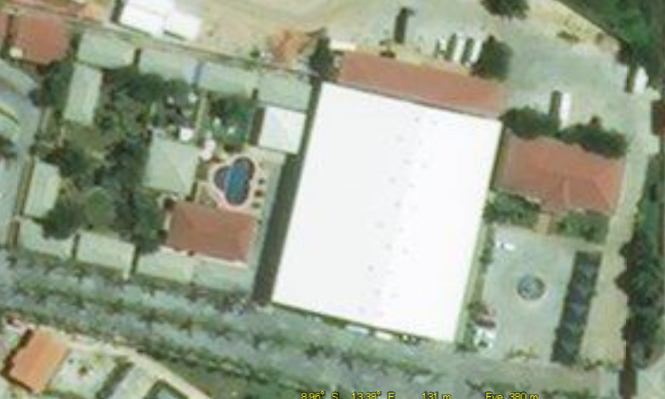
- Interactive map of Pavilhão Dream Space
- Location: Kikuxi, Viana, Luanda
- Coordinates: 8.961935°S 13.379406°E
- Owner: Private-owned
- Capacity: 2,500
- Surface: Hardwood
- Scoreboard: Electronic

The Pavilhão Dream Space is a private-owned sports arena located in Kikuxi, Viana, Luanda. The arena, has a 2,500-seat capacity, which was introduced in 2010, with hardwood flooring, and can be used for sports such as basketball, handball, volleyball and roller hockey.

Dreamspace has been the home ground of Angolan basketball side Recreativo do Libolo
