= Edson Ndoniema =

Angolan basketball player

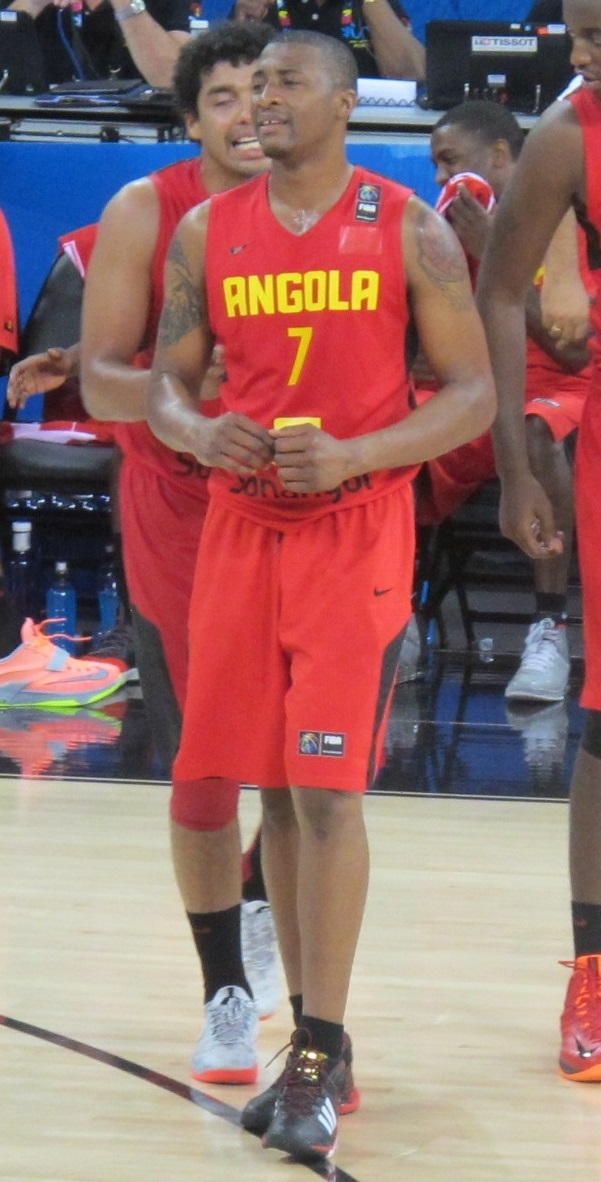
- Ndoniema in 2014

No. 4 – Primeiro de Agosto
- Position: Small forward
- League: BIC Basket; Africa Champions Cup

Personal information
- Born: February 11, 1991 (age 35) Luanda, Angola
- Listed height: 6 ft 4 in (1.93 m)
- Listed weight: 196 lb (89 kg)

Career information
- Playing career: 2008–present

Career history
- 2008–2010: Primeiro de Agosto
- 2010: Desportivo da Huíla
- 2011–2013: Recreativo do Libolo
- 2013–present: Primeiro de Agosto
Medals
Men's basketball
Representing Angola
AfroBasket
Silver medal – second place	Radès 2015	National Team
AfroCan
Bronze medal – third place	Mali 2019
African Games
Gold medal – first place	Brazzaville 2015	National Team
FIBA Africa Under-18 Championship
Silver medal – second place	Alexandria 2008	National Team
FIBA Africa Clubs Champions Cup
Gold medal – first place	Sousse 2013	1º de Agosto

Edson Alfredo da Costa Ndoniema (born February 11, 1991) is an Angolan professional basketball player. Ndoniema, who stands at 191 cm (6 ft 3 in), plays as a small forward.

In May 2013, Ndoniema was called up for the 2013 Afrobasket preliminary Angolan squad.

Ndoniema is currently playing for Angolan side Primeiro de Agosto at the Angolan basketball league BAI Basket and at the Africa Champions Cup.

Edson is married to fellow Angolan basketball player Sónia Ndoniema.
