= 2006–07 Angola Basketball Cup =

2007 Angola Basketball Cup
- League: Angola Basketball Cup
- Sport: Basketball
- Duration: March 6 – May 4, 2007; March 15 – April 3, 2007
- Teams: 8; 3
- TV partner: TPA1 (Angola) TPA Internacional (Worldwide) Supersport (Africa)

2007 Angola Basketball Cup
- Winners: Petro Atlético; Primeiro de Agosto

Angola Basketball Cup seasons
- ← 2006 2008 →

== Men's tournament ==
The 2007 Men's Basketball Cup was contested by 10 teams and won by Petro Atlético. The final was played on May 9 and 12, 2006.

=== Preliminary rounds ===
Mar 6 2007

| Vila Clotilde | 89–92 | Imbondeiro |

Pavilhão Anexo II, Luanda

| Lusíada | 73–76 | Desp Nocal |

Pavilhão Anexo II, Luanda

Mar 13 2007

| Imbondeiro | 0–20 | Vila Clotilde |

Pavilhão Anexo II, Luanda

| Desp Nocal | 89–83 | Lusíada |

Pavilhão Anexo II, Luanda

Mar 20 2007

| Desp da Nocal | vs. | Vila Clotilde |

Pavilhão Anexo II, Luanda

Mar 27 2007

| Vila Clotilde | vs. | Desp da Nocal |

Pavilhão Anexo II, Luanda

=== Final round ===
Quarter-finals (Apr ?, 10, 2007)
Petro Atlético | 94 | 97 | 191
ASA | 61 | 67 | 128
Interclube | 105 | 120 | 225
Sporting de Luanda | 64 | 59 | 123
CDUAN | 76 | 74 | 150
Primeiro de Agosto | 98 | 121 | 219
Misto de Cabinda | 59 | 75 | 134
Desportivo Nocal | 69 | 56 | 125

Semi-finals (Apr 17, 24, 2007)
Interclube | 82 | 70 | 152
Petro Atlético | 94 | 84 | 178
Primeiro de Agosto | 105 | 98 | 203
Misto de Cabinda | 71 | 62 | 133

Finals (May 1, 4, 2007)
Petro Atlético | 72 | 102 | 174
Primeiro de Agosto | 70 | 99 | 169

== Women's tournament ==
The 2007 Women's Basketball Cup was contested by three teams and won by Primeiro de Agosto.

=== Semi finals ===
| Maculusso | 58–48 | Interclube |

Pavilhão do CODENM

| Interclube | 67–51 | Maculusso |

=== Final ===
Mar 31, 2007

| 1º Agosto | 54–46 | Interclube |

Pavilhão 28 de Fevereiro

Apr 3, 2007

| Interclube | 73–65 | 1º Agosto |

Pavilhão Anexo

| 2007 Angola Men's Basketball Cup winner | 2007 Angola Women's Basketball Cup winner |
|---|---|
| Atlético Petróleos de Luanda; 10th title | Clube Desportivo Primeiro de Agosto; 9th title |

== See also ==
- 2007 Angola Basketball Super Cup
- 2007 BAI Basket
