= Angola Women's Basketball League =

- Current season, competition or edition: 2017 Angola Women's League
- Sport: Basketball
- Founded: 1977
- No. of teams: 6
- Country: Angola
- Continent: FIBA Africa (Africa)
- Most recent champion: 1º de Agosto (2016)
- Most titles: 1º de Agosto 12

The Angolan Women's Basketball League (Portuguese: Campeonato Nacional de Basquetebol em Séniores Femininos) is the top tier women's basketball league in Angola. The competition is organized by the Angolan Basketball Federation.

Primeiro de Agosto has been the most successful club in Angola with a total 12 titles won, followed by Interclube, with 4.

== League seasons and finals ==
Season	Edition	Date	Venue	Ref	Champion	Series	Score			Runner-up	Champion Coach	Finals Details
1998	13th				Nocal					Primeiro de Agosto	(Angola) Raúl Duarte	
1999	14th	20 Feb–05 Mar 2001			Primeiro de Agosto	round robin				Nocal	(Angola) Apolinário Paquete	
2000	15th	25 Nov–06 Dec 2001	1º Maio, Benguela		Primeiro de Agosto	round robin				Maculusso	(Angola) Apolinário Paquete	
2001	16th	26/28 Nov 2002	ANE / ANE		Primeiro de Agosto	2–0	68–39	70–59		Interclube	(Angola) Apolinário Paquete	
2002	17th				Primeiro de Agosto						(Angola) Apolinário Paquete	
2003	18th	27/28 Jan 2004	CID / CID		Primeiro de Agosto A	2–0	69–53	77–64		Maculusso	(Angola) Apolinário Paquete	
2004	19th				Primeiro de Agosto					Maculusso		
2005	20th	02–06 Feb 2006	1º Maio, Benguela		Primeiro de Agosto	double round robin				Interclube	(Angola) Aníbal Moreira	
2006	21st	03 Feb 2007	CID, Luanda		Interclube	41–36				Primeiro de Agosto	(Angola) Apolinário Paquete	
2007	22nd	03–14 Feb 2008	COD / 28 F		Primeiro de Agosto	2–0	47–30	58–64		Interclube	(Angola) Raúl Duarte	
2008	23rd	09/11 Feb 2009	ANE / ANE		Primeiro de Agosto	2–0	71–51	66–48		Interclube	(Angola) Higino Garcia	
2009	24th	17 Feb 2010	LUB, Lubango		Interclube	63–55				Primeiro de Agosto	(Angola) Apolinário Paquete	
2010	25th	?/27/28 Dec 2010	COD / 28 F / CID		Interclube	2–1	66–65	58–40	54–43	Primeiro de Agosto	(Angola) Apolinário Paquete	
2011	26th	05/08/22 Mar 2012	COD / 28 F / CID		Interclube	2–1	53–45	62–52	55–45	Primeiro de Agosto	(Angola) Apolinário Paquete	
2012	27th	15/17 Jan 2013	COD / 28 F		Primeiro de Agosto	2–0	62–54	52–57		Interclube	(Angola) Aníbal Moreira	
2013	28th	15 Feb 2014	SCB, Kuito		Interclube	70–65				Primeiro de Agosto	(Angola) Apolinário Paquete	
2014	29th	21–31 May 2014	PAR, Benguela		Primeiro de Agosto	65–59				Interclube	(Angola) Jaime Covilhã	
2015	30th	20–22 Jun 2015	ANE, Luanda		Primeiro de Agosto	2–0	55–49	67–39		Interclube	(Angola) Jaime Covilhã	
2016	31st	28 Jun–20 Jul 2016	Luanda		Interclube	3–0	68–62	74–54	51–48	Primeiro de Agosto	(Angola) Apolinário Paquete	
2017	32nd	Jun–6 Jul 2017	Luanda		Interclube	3–0	72–62	72–69	76–65	Primeiro de Agosto	(Angola) Apolinário Paquete	Extended content Sun, 2 Jul 2017; 18:00 WAT UTC+1: 1º de Agosto / 62–72 / Interclube; Scoring by quarter: 13-15, 13-17, 16-19, 20-21: Pts: Bulgak 18; Rebs: Bulgak 12; Asts: Elizabeth 4 / / Pts: Italee 30; Rebs: Pauline 10; Asts: Italee 7; 0–1 Pavilhão Dreamspace, Luanda Mon, 3 Jul 2017; 18:00 WAT UTC+1: 1º de Agosto / 69–72 (OT) / Interclube; Scoring by quarter: 10-16, 24-23, 24-9, 3-13, Overtime: 8-11: Pts: Gala 18; Rebs: Bulgak 10; Asts: Bulgak, Fineza 3 / / Pts: Parks 18; Rebs: Ngiendula 14; Asts: Italee 7; 0–2 Pavilhão Dreamspace, Luanda Wed, 5 Jul 2017; 18:00 WAT UTC+1: Interclube / 76–65 / 1º de Agosto; Scoring by quarter: 17-18, 14-12, 14-17, 31-18: Pts: Italee 25 / / Pts: Bulgak 18; 3–0 Pavilhão Dreamspace, Luanda

== MVP award winners and statistical leaders ==
Season	Champion	MVP	Top Scorer	Rebounds	Assists
2008	Primeiro de Agosto	(Angola) Nacissela Maurício (PRI)	(Angola) Felizarda Jorge (MAC)		
2009	Interclube	(United States) Danielle Green (INT)			
2010	Interclube	(United States) Danielle Green (INT)			
2011	Interclube	(Angola) Nadir Manuel (INT)	(United States) Danielle Green (INT)		
2014	Primeiro de Agosto	(Mozambique) Leia Dongue (PRI)	(Mozambique) Leia Dongue (PRI)	(Angola) Flora Bernardo (LUS)	
2015	Primeiro de Agosto	(Angola) Fineza Eusébio (PRI)	(Mozambique) Leia Dongue (PRI)	(United States) Lindsay Taylor (PRI)	(Angola) Helena Viegas (LUS)
2016	Interclube	(Angola) Italee Lucas (INT)	(Angola) Italee Lucas (INT)	(Democratic Republic of the Congo) Pauline Nsimbo (INT)	(Angola) Isabel Francisco (PRI)
2017	Interclube	(Angola) Italee Lucas (INT)	(Canada) Adut Bulgak (PRI)	(Canada) Adut Bulgak (PRI)	(Angola) Italee Lucas (INT)

== Total league championships ==
Team	Won	Years won
Primeiro de Agosto	12	1999, 2000, 2001, 2002, 2003, 2004, 2005, 2007, 2008, 2012, 2014, 2015
Interclube	12	1987, 1988, 1989, 1990, 1991, 2006, 2009, 2010, 2011, 2013, 2016, 2017
Desp. da Nocal	1	1998

== Participation details ==
Club
	Club	1998	1999	2000	2001	2002	2003	2004	2005	2006	2007	2008	2009	2010	2011	2012	2013	2014	2015	2016	2017	–	Gold medal	Silver medal	Bronze medal
–	Club	–	–	–	10	–	–	9	11	12	12	8	12	12	10	10	10	10	9	–	–	–	–	–	–
1	Primeiro de Agosto	2 1998	1 1999	1 2000	1 2001	1 2002	1 2003	1 2004	1 2005	2 2006	1 2007	1 2008	2 2009	2 2010	2 2011	1 2012	2 2013	1 2014	1 2015	2 2016	2 2017	17	12	5	0
2	Interclube	⋅	⋅	2000	2 2001	⋅	2003	⋅	2 2005	1 2006	2 2007	2008	1 2009	1 2010	1 2011	2 2012	1 2013	2 2014	2 2015	1 2016	1 2017	13	4	7	1
3	Desp Nocal	1 1998	2 1999	4	4	⋅	⋅	⋅	⋅	4	⋅	⋅	⋅	⋅	⋅	⋅	⋅	⋅	⋅	⋅	⋅	5	1		
4	Maculusso	⋅	3 1999	2 2000	3 2001	⋅	2 2003	2 2004	⋅	3 2006	⋅	3 2008	⋅	⋅	3 2011	3 2012	3 2013	3 2014	4	4	3 2017	8	0	3	8
5	Universidade Lusíada	⋅	⋅	⋅	⋅	⋅	⋅	⋅	⋅	⋅	⋅	⋅	⋅	⋅	⋅	⋅	⋅	4	3 2015	⋅	⋅	2			1
6	Juventude de Viana	⋅	⋅	⋅	⋅	⋅	⋅	⋅	⋅	⋅	⋅	⋅	⋅	⋅	4	4	⋅	⋅	⋅	⋅	⋅	⋅			
7	Primeiro de Agosto B	⋅	⋅	⋅	⋅	⋅	4	⋅	⋅	⋅	⋅	⋅	⋅	⋅	⋅	⋅	⋅	⋅	⋅	⋅	⋅	⋅			
8	Inter de Benguela	⋅	⋅	⋅	⋅	⋅	⋅	⋅	⋅	⋅	⋅	⋅	⋅	⋅	⋅	⋅	⋅	⋅	⋅	3 2016	4	1			
9	Sporting de Benguela	⋅	⋅	⋅	⋅	⋅	⋅	⋅	⋅	⋅	⋅	⋅	⋅	⋅	⋅	⋅	⋅	5	⋅	⋅	⋅	1			
10	Clube Amigos de Benguela	⋅	⋅	⋅	⋅	⋅	⋅	⋅	3 2005	⋅	⋅	⋅	⋅	⋅	⋅	⋅	⋅	⋅	⋅	⋅	⋅	⋅			
11	Misto de Benguela	⋅	⋅	5	⋅	⋅	⋅	⋅	⋅	⋅	⋅	⋅	⋅	⋅	⋅	⋅	⋅	⋅	⋅	⋅	⋅	⋅			
12	Misto da Huíla	⋅	⋅	⋅	⋅	⋅	⋅	⋅	⋅	⋅	⋅	⋅	⋅	⋅	⋅	⋅	5	6	⋅	⋅	⋅	⋅			
13	Sporting do Bié	⋅	⋅	⋅	⋅	⋅	⋅	⋅	⋅	⋅	⋅	⋅	⋅	⋅	⋅	⋅	⋅	7	⋅	⋅	⋅	⋅			
# Teams			3	5	⋅	⋅	⋅	⋅	3	⋅	⋅	⋅	⋅	⋅	4	4	5	7	4	4	4				

== See also ==
- Angola Cup
- Angola Super Cup
- Federação Angolana de Basquetebol
