= 2005–06 Angola Basketball Cup =

2006 Angola Basketball Cup
- League: Angola Basketball Cup
- Sport: Basketball
- Duration: Apr 11 – May 12, 2006; March 15 – April 13, 2006
- Teams: 8; 3
- TV partner: TPA1 (Angola) TPA Internacional (Worldwide) Supersport (Africa)

2006 Angola Basketball Cup
- Winners: Primeiro de Agosto; Primeiro de Agosto

Angola Basketball Cup seasons
- ← 2005 2007 →

== Men's tournament ==
The 2006 Men's Basketball Cup was contested by eight teams and won by Primeiro de Agosto. The final was played on May 9 and 12, 2006.

=== Preliminary rounds ===
Mar 14, 2006

Vila Clotilde	61–69	Lusíadas

Pavilhão Anexo, Luanda

Mar 21, 2006

Lusíadas	vs.	Vila Clotilde

=== Knockout round ===
Quarter-finals (Apr 11, 18, 2006)
ASA	71	77	148
Primeiro de Agosto	91	85	176
Sporting de Luanda	80	77	157
CDUAN	72	87	159
Banca de Cabinda	35	77	112
Petro Atlético	72	95	167
Interclube	91	101	192
Desportivo Nocal	72	67	139

Semi-finals (Apr 25, May 2, 2006)
Primeiro de Agosto	111	73	184
CDUAN	60	61	121
Petro Atlético	88	91	179
Interclube	73	62	135

Finals (May 9, 12, 2006)
Primeiro de Agosto	85	62	147
Petro Atlético	78	60	138

== Women's tournament ==
The 2006 Women's Basketball Cup was contested by three teams and won by Primeiro de Agosto.

=== Preliminary round ===
Mar 15, 2006

1º Agosto	vs.	Maculusso

CODENM

Mar 16, 2006

Maculusso	vs.	Interclube

Mar 22, 2006

Interclube	vs.	1º Agosto

Maculusso	vs.	1º Agosto

Interclube	vs.	Maculusso

1º Agosto	vs.	Interclube

=== Semi finals ===
Interclube	vs.	Maculusso

Maculusso	vs.	Interclube

=== Final ===
Apr 12, 2006

1º Agosto	53–37	Interclube

Pavilhão da Cidadela

Apr 13, 2006

Interclube	54–64	1º Agosto
Pts: Bopoli 17		Pts: Guerreiro 27

Pavilhão 28 Fevereiro

2006 Angola Men's Basketball Cup winner	2006 Angola Women's Basketball Cup winner
Clube Desportivo Pimeiro de Agosto; 10th title	Clube Desportivo Pimeiro de Agosto; 8th title

== See also ==
- 2006 Angola Basketball Super Cup
- 2006 BAI Basket
