= Taça de Angola (basketball) =

Annual basketball competition in Angola

- Sport: Basketball
- Founded: 1985
- Continent: FIBA Africa (Africa)
- Most recent champions: Men's: Petro de Luanda (15th title) (2024–25)
- Most titles: Men's: Primeiro de Agosto and Petro de Luanda (15 titles); Women's: Primeiro de Agosto (12 titles)

The Taça de Angola (translated as the Angolan Basketball Cup) is an annual basketball competition in which all Angolan basketball clubs are eligible to contest. The tournament, played in a knock-out system, is Angola's second most important basketball competition following the national league.

== Men's finals ==
Season	Edition	Date	Ref	Venue	Winner	Score	Runner-up	Coach
1999–00	16th	April 16, 2000		Cidadela, Luanda	Petro Atlético	83–69	ASA	(Angola) Paulo Jorge
2000–01	17th	May 5, 2001		Lobito	Petro Atlético	108–49	PROMADE	(Angola) Victorino Cunha
2001–02	18th	May 4, 2002		Cidadela, Luanda	Primeiro de Agosto	91–75	Petro Atlético	(Portugal) Mário Palma
2002–03	19th	June 7, 2003		Cidadela, Luanda	Primeiro de Agosto	91–61	Interclube	(Portugal) Mário Palma
2003–04	20th	May 23, 2004		Cidadela, Luanda	Petro Atlético	93–73	Primeiro de Agosto	(Angola) Raúl Duarte
2004–05	21st	May 6, 2005		CODENM, Luanda	Primeiro de Agosto	75–74	Petro Atlético	(Portugal) Mário Palma
2005–06	22nd	May 9/12, 2006		Cidadela, Luanda	Primeiro de Agosto	85–78 / 62–60	Petro Atlético	(Angola) Jaime Covilhã
2006–07	23rd	May 1/4, 2007		Anexo, Luanda	Petro Atlético	72–70 / 102–99	Primeiro de Agosto	(Angola) Alberto de Carvalho
2007–08	24th	April 22, 2008		Cidadela, Luanda	Primeiro de Agosto	93–61	ASA	(Portugal) Luís Magalhães
2008–09	25th	April 14/17/18, 2009		COD/COD/CID, Luanda	Primeiro de Agosto	106–93 / 75–89 / 89–87	Petro Atlético	(Portugal) Luís Magalhães
2009–10	26th	May 11/14/17, 2010		COD/COD/CID, Luanda	Recreativo do Libolo	80–116 / 92–89 / 76–74	Primeiro de Agosto	(Angola) Raúl Duarte
2010–11	27th	April 20/22/24, 2011		Cidadela, Luanda	Recreativo do Libolo	78–69 / 88–99 / 83–68	Petro Atlético	(Angola) Raúl Duarte
2011–12	28th	April 17/19, 2012		28F/COD, Luanda	Primeiro de Agosto	94–56 / 80–77	Interclube	(Portugal) Mário Palma
2012–13	29th	April 16/19, 2013		DS/ANE, Luanda	Petro Atlético	118–107 / 96–94	Recreativo do Libolo	(Cameroon) Lazare Adingono
2013–14	30th	April 17/19, 2014		PMU, Luanda	Petro de Luanda	96–89 / 88–82	Primeiro de Agosto	(Cameroon) Lazare Adingono
2014–15	31st	April 18, 2015		Cidadela, Luanda	Recreativo do Libolo	79–70	Primeiro de Agosto	(Portugal) Norberto Alves
2015–16	32nd	Feb 29–April 22, 2016		Cidadela, Luanda	Recreativo do Libolo	105–95	Petro de Luanda	(Portugal) Norberto Alves
2016–17	33rd	Apr 3–May 13, 2017		Kilamba, Luanda	Recreativo do Libolo	82–71	Petro de Luanda	(Spain) Hugo López
2017–18	34th	Apr 3–May 5, 2018		Cidadela, Luanda	Primeiro de Agosto	101–77	Benfica do Libolo	(Angola) Paulo Macedo
2018–19	35th			Cidadela, Luanda	Primeiro de Agosto	87–84	Interclube	
2019–20	36th	Cancelled due to the COVID-19 pandemic in Angola						
2020–21	37th			Kilamba, Luanda	Primeiro de Agosto	100–98	Interclube	(Angola) Necas
2021–22	35th			Kilamba, Luanda	Petro de Luanda	107–88	Primeiro de Agosto	(Brazil) José Neto
2022–23	36th			Kilamba, Luanda	Petro de Luanda	102–84	Interclube	(Brazil) José Neto
2023–24	37th			Cidadela, Luanda	Interclube	75–72	Petro de Luanda	
2024–25	38th			Cidadela, Luanda	Petro de Luanda	110–82	Vila Clotilde	Sergio Valdeolmillos

=== Performance by team ===
Primeiro de Agosto and Petro de Luanda jointly hold the record for most Cups won in the men's category, with 15 titles.

Team	Won	Years won
Primeiro de Agosto	15	1985, 1986, 1987, 1988, 1992, 1995, 2002, 2003, 2005, 2006, 2008, 2009, 2012, 2018, 2021
Petro de Luanda	15	1990, 1991, 1994, 1996, 1997, 1998, 2000, 2001, 2004, 2007, 2013, 2014, 2022, 2023, 2025
Recreativo do Libolo	5	2010, 2011, 2015, 2016, 2017
ASA	2	1993, 1999
Dínamo	1	1989
Interclube	1	2024

=== Final MVP Award ===
After each Cup season's final, a Most Valuable Player of the final is awarded.

Season	Winner	Ref.
2022–23	Childe Dundão (Petro de Luanda)	

== Women's finals ==
Season	Edition	Date	Ref	Venue	Winner	Score	Runner-up	Coach
1999–00	15th				Primeiro de Agosto A		Desportivo da Nocal	
2000–01	16th	17 Mar 2001			Primeiro de Agosto		Desportivo da Nocal	(Angola) Apolinário Paquete
2001–02	17th	22 Dec 2001			Primeiro de Agosto A		Maculusso	(Angola) Apolinário Paquete
2002–03	18th	03–15 Jan 2003			Primeiro de Agosto		Interclube	(Angola) Apolinário Paquete
2003–04	19th	10–11 Feb 2004			Primeiro de Agosto A	82–40 / 97–52	Primeiro de Agosto B	(Angola) Apolinário Paquete
2004–05	20th	21 Jan 2005			Primeiro de Agosto A		Maculusso	(Angola) Apolinário Paquete
2005–06	21st	12–13 Apr 2006		CID/28F, Luanda	Primeiro de Agosto	53–37 / 64–54	Interclube	(Angola) Higino Garcia
2006–07	22nd	31 Mar/02 Apr 2007		28F/ANE, Luanda	Primeiro de Agosto	54–46 / 65–73	Interclube	(Angola) Aníbal Moreira
2007–08	23rd	10/12 Mar 2008		28F/ANE, Luanda	Primeiro de Agosto	67–46 / 68–36	Interclube	(Angola) Raúl Duarte
2008–09	24th	23/25/26 Feb 2009		28F/COD/CID, Luanda	Primeiro de Agosto	52–51 / 49–68 / 50–33	Interclube	(Angola) Higino Garcia
2009–10	25th	3/8 Mar 2010		COD/28F, Luanda	Interclube	50–46 / 56–53	Primeiro de Agosto	(Angola) Apolinário Paquete
2010–11	26th	10/12 Nov 2010		28F/Cidadela, Luanda	Interclube	86–35 / 75–41	Maculusso	(Angola) Apolinário Paquete
2011–12	27th	24/27 Feb 2012		COD/28F, Luanda	Interclube	57–52 / 83–69	Primeiro de Agosto	(Angola) Apolinário Paquete
2012–13	28th	31 Jan/02 Feb 2013		28F/COD, Luanda	Interclube	50–46 / 52–32	Primeiro de Agosto	(Angola) Apolinário Paquete
2013–14	29th	20 May–10 Jun 2014		28F/COD/ANE, Luanda	Primeiro de Agosto	53–39 / 64-66 / 62-35	Interclube	(Angola) Jaime Covilhã
2014–15	30th	08–14 Jun 2015		Cidadela, Luanda	Primeiro de Agosto	60-52	Interclube	(Angola) Jaime Covilhã
2015–16	31st	06–10 Jul 2016		Luanda	Interclube	54-48	Primeiro de Agosto	(Angola) Apolinário Paquete
2016–17	32nd	20–22 Jun 2017		Luanda	Interclube	65-58	Primeiro de Agosto	(Angola) Apolinário Paquete

=== Performance by team ===
Team	Won	Years won
Primeiro de Agosto	13	1999, 2000, 2001, 2002, 2003, 2004, 2005, 2006, 2007, 2008, 2009, 2014, 2015
Interclube	6	2010, 2011, 2012, 2013, 2016, 2017

== See also ==
- BAI Basket
- Angola Super Cup
- Federação Angolana de Basquetebol
