= 2012–13 Angola Basketball Cup =

2013 Angola Basketball Cup
- League: Angola Basketball Cup
- Sport: Basketball
- Duration: February 3 – April 19, 2013; January 22 – February 2, 2013
- Teams: 13 / 4
- TV partners: TPA1 (Angola); TPA Internacional (Worldwide); Supersport (Africa)

2013 Angola Basketball Cup
- Winners: Petro Atlético

Angola Basketball Cup seasons
- ← 2012 2014 →

The 2012–13 Angola men's basketball cup was contested by 13 teams and ran from February 3 to April 19, 2013, whereas the four-team women's tournament ran from January 22 to February 2.

== 2013 Angola men's basketball cup ==
The 2013 men's basketball cup was contested by 13 teams and won by Petro Atlético, thus dethroning Primeiro de Agosto. The 2-leg final was played on April 16 and 19, with Petro winning with a 2–0 record.

=== Preliminary rounds ===
Semifinals
Feb 3 2013, 28 Fev
Universidade Lusíada	80
Sporting de Luanda	64
Feb 3 2013, Anexo
Vila Clotilde	83
Imbondeiro	64

Final
Feb 17 2013, 28 Fev / Feb 24 2013
Universidade Lusíada	109
Vila Clotilde	74

Final
Anexo
Universidade Lusíada
CDUAN

=== Final round ===
Quarter-finals (Mar 12, 15, 2013)
Petro Atlético	102	73	175
Lusíadas	80	86	166
ASA	102	109	211
Vila Clotilde	106	89	195
Recreativo do Libolo	90	20	110
Progresso	52	0	52
Primeiro de Agosto	96	90	186
Interclube	91	64	155

Semi-finals (Mar 19, 22, 2013)
Petro Atlético	86	77	163
ASA	64	69	133
Recreativo do Libolo	85	82	167
Primeiro de Agosto	83	83	166

Finals (Apr 16, 19, 2013)
Petro Atlético	118	96	214
Recreativo do Libolo	107	94	201

=== Final ===
April 16, 2013
18:00 WAT

Report (in Portuguese)

R. do Libolo	107–118	Petro Atlético
Scoring by quarter: 24-25, 25-27, 30-26, 28-37
Pts: Olímpio 22		Pts: C.Morais 42

Pavilhão Dream Space, Luanda

April 19, 2013
18:00 WAT

Report (in Portuguese)

Petro Atlético	96–94	R. do Libolo
Scoring by quarter: n/a, n/a
Pts: C.Morais 24		Pts: Olímpio, R.Fortes 19

Pavilhão Anexo, Luanda

== 2013 Angola women's basketball cup ==
The 2013 women's cup was contested by four teams, with the 2-leg cup finals decided by playoff, with Interclube winning the title.

=== Preliminary stage ===
==== Day 1 ====
January 22, 2013
17:00 WAT

Report (in Portuguese)

Maculusso	51–68	1º de Agosto
Scoring by quarter: 8-18, 14-11, 14-20, 15-19
Pts: n/a		Pts: n/a

Pavilhão do CODENM, Luanda

January 22, 2013
19:00 WAT

Report (in Portuguese)

Juv. de Viana	27–72	Interclube
Scoring by quarter: n/a, n/a, 11-11, 15-15
Pts: n/a		Pts: n/a

Pavilhão do CODENM, Luanda

==== Day 2 ====
January 24, 2013
17:00 WAT

Report (in Portuguese)

Maculusso	77–40	Juv. de Viana
Scoring by quarter: n/a, n/a
Pts: n/a		Pts: n/a

Pavilhão 28 de Fevereiro, Luanda

January 24, 2013
19:00 WAT

Report (in Portuguese)

Interclube	52–48	1º de Agosto
Scoring by quarter: n/a-n/a, 26-22, 11-11, 15-15
Pts: Ngiendula 15		Pts: Deolinda 16

Pavilhão 28 de Fevereiro, Luanda

==== Day 3 ====
January 27, 2013
17:00 WAT

Juv. de Viana	0–20	1º de Agosto
Scoring by quarter: n/a, n/a
Pts: n/a		Pts: n/a

Pavilhão Dream Space, Luanda

January 27, 2013
19:00 WAT

Interclube	vs.	Maculusso
Scoring by quarter: n/a, n/a
Pts: n/a		Pts: n/a

Pavilhão Dream Space, Luanda

=== Knockout stage ===
Semi-finals (Jan 30, 2013)
Interclube	77
Juventude de Viana	34
Primeiro de Agosto	73
Maculusso	41

Final (Jan 31, Feb 2, 2013)
Interclube	50	52
Primeiro de Agosto	46	32

=== Preliminary stage ===
10 December 2013
18:00 WAT

1º de Agosto	62–57	Interclube
Scoring by quarter: n/a, n/a
Pts: n/a		Pts: n/a

Pavilhão Victorino Cunha, Luanda

10 December 2013
18:00 WAT

Maculusso	vs.	Juventude de Viana
Scoring by quarter: n/a, n/a
Pts: n/a		Pts: n/a

Pavilhão Anexo, Luanda

11 December 2013
18:00 WAT

Juventude de Viana	vs.	1º de Agosto
Scoring by quarter: n/a, n/a
Pts: n/a		Pts: n/a

Pavilhão 28 de Fevereiro, Luanda

11 December 2013
18:00 WAT

Interclube	vs.	Maculusso
Scoring by quarter: n/a, n/a
Pts: n/a		Pts: n/a

Pavilhão 28 de Fevereiro, Luanda

12 December 2013
18:00 WAT

1º de Agosto	vs.	Maculusso
Scoring by quarter: n/a, n/a
Pts: n/a		Pts: n/a

Pavilhão Victorino Cunha, Luanda

12 December 2013
18:00 WAT

Juventude de Viana	vs.	Interclube
Scoring by quarter: n/a, n/a
Pts: n/a		Pts: n/a

Pavilhão 28 de Fevereiro, Luanda

=== Knockout stage ===
Semi-finals (Dec 14, 16, 2013)
Interclube	57
Maculusso	24
1º de Agosto	20	20
Juventude de Viana	0	0

Final (Dec 17, 19, 20, 2013)
Interclube	53	60	64
1º de Agosto	56	54	68

2013 Angola Men's Basketball Cup winner	2013 Angola Women's Basketball Cup winner
Atlético Petróleos de Luanda; 11th title	Grupo Desportivo Interclube; 3rd title

== See also ==
- 2013 Angola Basketball Super Cup
- 2013 BAI Basket
- 2013 Victorino Cunha Cup
