= 2003–04 Angola Basketball Cup =

2004 Angola Basketball Cup
- League: Angola Basketball Cup
- Sport: Basketball
- Duration: February 2–11, 2004
- Teams: / 5
- TV partner: TPA1 (Angola) TPA Internacional (Worldwide) Supersport (Africa)

2004 Angola Basketball Cup
- Winners: Petro Atlético; Primeiro de Agosto A

Angola Basketball Cup seasons
- ← 2003 2005 →

== 2004 Angola Men's Basketball Cup ==
Petro Atlético won the trophy by beating Primeiro de Agosto 93–73 in the final played on May 23, 2004, at the Pavilhão da Cidadela.

Quarter-finals (Apr 14 / 20, 2004)
Petro Atlético	80
ASA	66
Interclube
Desportivo da Nocal
CPPL
Primeiro de Agosto
Sporting de Cabinda
Sporting de Luanda

Semi-finals (Apr 19 / 26, 2004)
Petro Atlético
Interclube
Primeiro de Agosto
Sporting de Cabinda

Final (May 23, 2004)
Petro Atlético	93
Primeiro de Agosto	73

== 2004 Angola Women's Basketball Cup ==
The 2004 Women's Basketball Cup was contested by five teams that played a preliminary round robin, the top two of which played the final at the best of three games Primeiro de Agosto A was the winner.

=== Preliminary rounds ===
==== Day 1 ====
February 2, 2004

1º de Agosto A	68–37	1º de Agosto B

Pavilhão do CODENM, Luanda

Interclube	48–40	Maculusso

Pavilhão 28 de Fevereiro, Luanda

==== Day 2 ====
February 3, 2004

Maculusso	39–40	1º de Agosto A

Campo da SISTEC, Luanda

1º de Agosto B	50–32	Desp da Nocal

Pavilhão do CODENM, Luanda

==== Day 3 ====
February 4, 2004

1º de Agosto A	93–35	Interclube

Pavilhão do CODENM, Luanda

Desp da Nocal	29–62	Maculusso

Campo da NOCAL, Luanda

==== Day 4 ====
February 5, 2004

Maculusso	50–57	1º de Agosto B

Campo da SISTEC, Luanda

Interclube	34–27	Desp da Nocal

Pavilhão 28 de Fevereiro, Luanda

==== Day 5 ====
February 6, 2004

1º de Agosto B	48–65	Interclube

Pavilhão do CODENM, Luanda

Desp da Nocal	27–87	1º de Agosto A

Campo da NOCAL, Luanda

=== Knockout round ===
Semi-finals (Feb 8, 2004)
Primeiro de Agosto A	98
Maculusso	42
Interclube	46
Primeiro de Agosto B	50

Final (Feb 10, 11, 2004)
Primeiro de Agosto A	82	97
Primeiro de Agosto B	40	52

2004 Angola Men's Basketball Cup winner	2004 Angola Women's Basketball Cup winner
Atlético Petróleos de Luanda; 9th title	Clube Desportivo Pimeiro de Agosto; 6th title

== See also ==
- 2004 Angola Basketball Super Cup
- 2004 BAI Basket
