= 2004–05 Angola Basketball Cup =

2005 Angola Basketball Cup
- League: Angola Basketball Cup
- Sport: Basketball
- Duration: March 22 – May 6, 2005
- Teams: 4
- TV partner: TPA1 (Angola) TPA Internacional (Worldwide) Supersport (Africa)

2005 Angola Basketball Cup
- Winners: Primeiro de Agosto; Primeiro de Agosto A

Angola Basketball Cup seasons
- ← 2004 2006 →

== Men's tournament ==
The 2005 Men's Basketball Cup was contested by eight teams and won by Primeiro de Agosto. The final was played on May 6, 2005.

Quarter-finals (Mar 22 / ?, 2005)
Primeiro de Agosto
Sporting de Luanda
Interclube
CDUAN
Petro Atlético
Desportivo da Nocal
ASA
Banca de Cabinda

Semi-finals (Apr 19 / 26, 2005)
Primeiro de Agosto | 98 | 100 | 198
Interclube | 100 | 74 | 174
Petro Atlético | 91 | 97 | 188
ASA | 72 | 72 | 144

Final (May 6, 2005)
Primeiro de Agosto | 75
Petro Atlético | 74

== Women's tournament ==
The 2005 Women's Basketball Cup was won by Primeiro de Agosto A.

=== Preliminary round ===
Jan 11, 2005

| Interclube | vs. | 1º Agosto A |

Pavilhão 28 de Fevereiro

| Maculusso | vs. | 1º Agosto B |

Campo Vila Clotilde

Jan 12, 2005

| 1º Agosto B | vs. | Interclube |

| 1º Agosto A | vs. | Maculusso |

Jan 13, 2005

| Maculusso | vs. | Interclube |

| 1º Agosto B | vs. | 1º Agosto A |

=== Final round ===
Semifinals
Jan 17 2005
1º de Agosto A | 85
1º de Agosto B | 40
Jan 17 2005 28 Fev
Desp do Maculusso | 80
Interclube | 64

Final
Jan 21 2005, CODENM
1º de Agosto A | ?
Desp do Maculusso | ?

| 2005 Angola Men's Basketball Cup winner | 2005 Angola Women's Basketball Cup winner |
|---|---|
| Clube Desportivo Pimeiro de Agosto; 9th title | Clube Desportivo Pimeiro de Agosto; 7th title |

== See also ==
- 2005 Angola Basketball Super Cup
- 2005 BAI Basket
