= 2000–01 Angola Basketball Cup =

2001 Angola Basketball Cup
- League: Angola Basketball Cup
- Sport: Basketball
- Duration: Apr 27 – May 5, 2001; December 18 – 22, 2001
- Teams: 8
- TV partner: TPA1 (Angola) TPA Internacional (Worldwide) Supersport (Africa)

Angola Basketball Cup 2000-2001
- Winners: Petro Atlético; Desportivo da Nocal

Angola Basketball Cup seasons
- ← 2000 2002 →

== 2001 Men's Basketball Cup ==
The 2001 Men's Basketball Cup was contested by sixteen teams and won by Petro Atlético, thus defending its title. The final was played on May 5, 2001.

=== Preliminary rounds ===
Mar 9, 2001

Sporting	81–74	Interclube

ASA	72–89	1º de Agosto

Pavilhão da Cidadela, Luanda

Mar 10, 2001

Interclube	70–68	Sporting

1º de Agosto	80–48	ASA

Pavilhão do CODENM, Luanda

=== Final round ===
Quarter-finals
Petro Atlético
Apr 27 2001 COQ / Apr 28 COD
Primeiro de Agosto	89
Sporting de Luanda	63
Mar 27 2001 CAB
PROMADE
Vila Clotilde
Desportivo da Nocal	64
CPPL	58

Semi-finals
May 3, 2001 – (CID)
Petro Atlético	97
Primeiro de Agosto	93
May 3, 2000 – (LOB)
PROMADE	63
CPPL	62

Final
May 5, 2001 – (LOB)
Petro Atlético	108
PROMADE	49

== 2001 Women's Basketball Cup ==
The 2001 Women's Basketball Cup was contested by three teams in a round robin system. Primeiro de Agosto was the winner.

=== Day 1 ===
Mar 10, 2001

Maculusso	54–38	1º de Agosto

Pavilhão Anexo, Luanda

=== Day 2 ===
Mar 11, 2001

Desp Nocal	57–29	Maculusso

=== Day 3 ===
Mar 13, 2001

1º de Agosto	64–45	Desp Nocal

=== Standings ===
	Team	M	W	L	PF	PA	Diff	P
Gold medal	Primeiro de Agosto	2	1	1	102	99	+3	3
Silver medal	Desportivo da Nocal	2	1	1	102	74	+28	3
Bronze medal	Desportivo do Maculusso	2	1	1	83	95	-12	3

2001 Angola Men's Basketball Cup winner	2001 Angola Women's Basketball Cup winner
Atlético Petróleos de Luanda; 8th title	Clube Desportivo Primeiro de Agosto; 3rd title

== See also ==
- 2001 Angola Basketball Super Cup
- 2001 BAI Basket
