= 2013–14 Angola Basketball Cup =

2014 Angola Basketball Cup
- League: Angola Basketball Cup
- Sport: Basketball
- Duration: December 10–19
- Teams: 3
- TV partners: TPA1 (Angola); TPA Internacional (Worldwide); Supersport (Africa)

2014 Angola Basketball Cup

Angola Basketball Cup seasons
- ← 2013 2015 →

The 2013-14 Angola men's basketball cup is a basketball competition held in Angola. The women's tournament was contested by only three teams following the withdrawal of G.D. Juventude de Viana for administrative reasons. The tournament, that ran from December 10–19, 2013.

== 2014 Angola Men's Basketball Cup ==
=== Group 1 ===
Heja SC	20–0	1º de Maio

Misto do Bié	vs.	Heja SC

=== Group 2 ===
Lusíada	vs.	Vila Clotilde

Vila Clotilde	vs.	Progresso

1 March 2014
15:00

Progresso	67–70	Lusíada

Pavilhão 28 de Fevereiro, Luanda

=== Final round ===
Quarter-finals (Mar 4, 5, 9, 2014)
Primeiro de Agosto	92	94	186
Interclube	62	100	162
Universidade Lusíada	65	54	119
Recreativo do Libolo	91	71	162
Misto do Bié	69	63	132
Petro de Luanda	151	140	291
Sporting de Benguela	74	52	126
ASA	89	62	151

Semi-finals (Mar 25, 28, 2014)
Primeiro de Agosto	87	102	189
Recreativo do Libolo	95	76	171
Petro de Luanda	114	78	192
ASA	70	71	141

Finals (Apr 17, 19, 2014)
Primeiro de Agosto	89	82	171
Petro de Luanda	96	88	184

== 2014 Angola Women's Basketball Cup ==
The 2014 Women's Cup was contested by three teams, with the 2-leg cup finals decided by playoff, with Interclube winning the title.

=== Preliminary stage ===
==== Day 1 ====
December 10, 2013
19:00

1º de Agosto	62–57	Interclube

Pavilhão Victorino Cunha, Luanda

==== Day 2 ====
December 11, 2013
18:00

Interclube	vs.	Maculusso

Pavilhão 28 de Fevereiro, Luanda

==== Day 3 ====
December 12, 2013
18:00

1º de Agosto	66–39	Maculusso

Pavilhão Victorino Cunha, Luanda

December 12, 2013
18:00

Interclube	20–0	Juventude de Viana

Pavilhão 28 de Fevereiro, Luanda

=== Knockout stage ===
Quarter-finals (20 May 2014)
1º de Agosto	111
Misto da Huíla	23
Lusíada	57
Sp de Benguela	42
Interclube ^{t.h.}
Maculusso	74
Sp do Bié	22

Semi-finals (3-4 Jun 2014)
1º de Agosto	79	84	163
Lusíada	36	36	72
Interclube	92	69	161
Maculusso	32	42	74

Finals (7-8-10 Jun 2014)
1º de Agosto	53	64	62	179
Interclube	39	66	35	140

^t.h. Advanced to semifinals as title holder.

2014 Angola Men's Basketball Cup winner	2014 Angola Women's Basketball Cup winner
Atlético Petróleos de Luanda; 12th title	Clube Desportivo Primeiro de Agosto; 13th title

== See also ==
- 2014 Angola Basketball Super Cup
- 2014 BAI Basket
- 2014 Victorino Cunha Cup
