= 2010 Victorino Cunha Cup =

Victorino Cunha Cup 2010
- League: Victorino Cunha Cup
- Sport: Basketball
- Duration: October 6–9, 2010
- Teams: 4
- TV partner: TPA1 (Angola) TPA Internacional (Worldwide) Supersport (Africa)

Victorino Cunha Cup season
- Winner: Petro Atlético

Victorino Cunha Cup seasons
- ← 2009 2011 →

The Victorino Cunha Cup is an annual Angolan basketball tournament held in honour of former Angolan basketball coach Victorino Cunha. The 2nd edition (2010), ran from October 6 to 9, and was contested by four teams in a round robin system. Petro Atlético was the winner.

== Schedule ==
=== Round 1 ===
October 06, 2010
17:00 UTC+1

Report

1º de Agosto	74–87	Interclube
Scoring by quarter: n/a, n/a

Pavilhão do CODENM, Luanda

October 06, 2010
19:00 UTC+1

Report

Petro Atlético	75–70	R. do Libolo
Scoring by quarter: 19-16, 20-11, 12-24, 24-19
Pts: Isom 25		Pts: Olímpio 16

Pavilhão do CODENM, Luanda

=== Round 2 ===
October 9, 2010
17:00 UTC+1

Report

R. do Libolo	81–73	Interclube
Scoring by quarter: n/a, n/a
Pts: Mayzer 18		Pts: E.Camacho 20

Pavilhão do CODENM, Luanda

October 9, 2010
19:30 UTC+1

Report

Petro Atlético	99–96	1º de Agosto
Scoring by quarter: 22-30, 29-23
Pts: R.Nealy 21		Pts: Lutonda 25

Pavilhão do CODENM, Luanda

=== Round 3 ===
October 9, 2010
17:00 UTC+1

Report

Interclube	67–72	Petro Atlético
Scoring by quarter: n/a, n/a

Pavilhão do CODENM, Luanda

October 9, 2010
19:30 UTC+1

Report

R. do Libolo	97–96	1º de Agosto
Scoring by quarter: n/a, n/a

Pavilhão do CODENM, Luanda

== Final standings ==
	Teams	Pl	W	L	PF	PA	Diff	P
1.	Petro Atlético	3	3	0	241	227	+14	6
2.	Recreativo do Libolo	3	2	1	248	244	+4	5
3.	Interclube	3	1	2	227	227	0	4
4.	Primeiro de Agosto	3	0	3	266	283	-17	3

2010 Victorino Cunha Cup
Atlético Petróleos de Luanda
1st title

== See also ==
- 2010 BAI Basket
- 2010 Angola Basketball Cup
- 2010 Angola Basketball Super Cup
