= 2013 Victorino Cunha Cup =

- League: Victorino Cunha Cup
- Sport: Basketball
- Duration: October 22–24
- Teams: 4
- TV partner: TPA2 (Angola) TPA Internacional (Worldwide) Supersport (Africa)

Victorino Cunha Cup season
- Winner: Clube Recreativo do Libolo
- Season MVP: Olímpio Cipriano

Victorino Cunha Cup seasons
- ← 2012 2014 →

The Victorino Cunha Cup is an annual Angolan basketball tournament held in honour of former Angolan basketball coach Victorino Cunha. The 5th edition (2013), ran from October 22 to 24, and was contested by the top four teams of the 2013 BAI Basket, and played in a round robin system. Recreativo do Libolo ended the tournament undefeated to win its first title.

== Schedule ==
=== Round 1 ===
October 22, 2013
17:00 UTC+1

[]

Petro Atlético	76–86	R. do Libolo
Scoring by quarter: 14-31, 17-15, 20-17, 25-23
Pts: Kiala 15; Rebs: Kiala 19		Pts: Sonko 25; Rebs: Olímpio 9

Pavilhão Victorino Cunha, Luanda

October 22, 2013
19:00 UTC+1

[]

1º de Agosto	84–77	Interclube
Scoring by quarter: 14-16, 14-20, 27-20, 29-21
Pts: Moore 19; Rebs: Moore, Kikas 8		Pts: P.Barros 18; Rebs: A.Miguel 14

Pavilhão Victorino Cunha, Luanda

=== Round 2 ===
October 23, 2013
16:00 UTC+1

[]

Interclube	91–94 ()	Petro Atlético
Scoring by quarter: 17-14, 22-18, 26-24, 18-27, Overtime: 8-11
Pts: Xavier 22; Rebs: A.Miguel 11		Pts: Bonifácio 26; Rebs: Kiala, Vander 11

Pavilhão Victorino Cunha, Luanda

October 23, 2013
19:00 UTC+1

[]

R. do Libolo	78–69	1º de Agosto
Scoring by quarter: 15-17, 19-25, 18-16, 26-11
Pts: Mingas 18; Rebs: Mingas, Olímpio 8		Pts: Moore, Correia 17; Rebs: Moore 7

Pavilhão Victorino Cunha, Luanda

=== Round 3 ===
October 24, 2013
16:30 UTC+1

[]

R. do Libolo	86–75	Interclube
Scoring by quarter: 24-12, 15-25, 27-25, 20-13
Pts: Olímpio 25; Rebs: Sonko 10		Pts: Xavier 12; Rebs: A.Miguel 8

Pavilhão Victorino Cunha, Luanda

October 24, 2013
19:00 UTC+1

[]

1º de Agosto	90–60	Petro Atlético
Scoring by quarter: 27-9, 24-14, 21-19, 18-18
Pts: Isom 17; Rebs: Isom 8		Pts: Bonifácio 16; Rebs: Vander 6

Pavilhão Victorino Cunha, Luanda

== Final standings ==
	Teams	Pl	W	L	PF	PA	Diff	P
1.	Recreativo do Libolo	3	3	0	250	220	+30	6
2.	Primeiro de Agosto	3	2	1	243	215	+28	5
3.	Petro Atlético	3	1	2	230	267	-37	4
4.	Interclube	3	0	3	243	264	-21	3

== Awards ==
2013 Victorino Cunha Cup
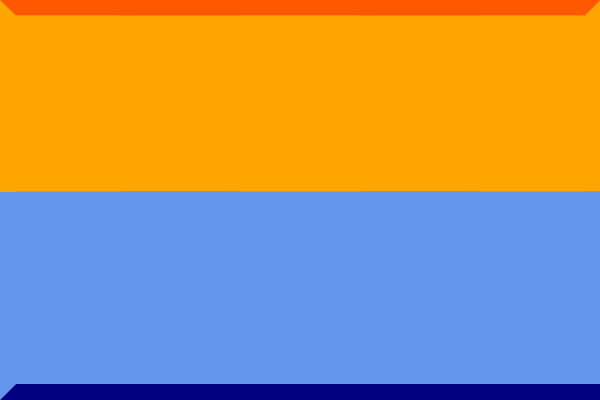
Clube Recreativo Desportivo do Libolo
1st title

Most Valuable Player
(Angola) Olímpio Cipriano

== See also ==
- 2013 BAI Basket
- 2013 Angola Basketball Cup
- 2013 Angola Basketball Super Cup
