= 2011 Victorino Cunha Cup =

Victorino Cunha Cup 2011
- League: Victorino Cunha Cup
- Sport: Basketball
- Duration: October 13–15 2011
- Teams: 4
- TV partner: TPA1 (Angola) TPA Internacional (Worldwide) Supersport (Africa)

Victorino Cunha Cup season
- Winner: Primeiro de Agosto

Victorino Cunha Cup seasons
- ← 2010 2012 →

The Victorino Cunha Cup is an annual Angolan basketball tournament held in honour of former Angolan basketball coach Victorino Cunha. The 3rd edition (2011), ran from October 13 to 15, and was contested by four teams in a round robin system. Primeiro de Agosto was the winner.

== Schedule ==
=== Round 1 ===
October 13, 2011
17:00 UTC+1

Report

Lusíadas	74–94	Interclube
Scoring by quarter: n/a, n/a

Pavilhão do CODENM, Luanda

October 13, 2011
19:00 UTC+1

Report

1º de Agosto	98–77	ASA
Scoring by quarter: n/a, n/a

Pavilhão do CODENM, Luanda

=== Round 2 ===
October 14, 2011
17:00 UTC+1

Report

ASA	74–81	Interclube
Scoring by quarter: n/a, n/a

Pavilhão do CODENM, Luanda

October 14, 2011
19:00 UTC+1

Report

Lusíadas	51–101	1º de Agosto
Scoring by quarter: n/a, n/a

Pavilhão do CODENM, Luanda

=== Round 3 ===
October 15, 2011
17:00 UTC+1

Report

Lusíadas	53–74	ASA
Scoring by quarter: n/a, n/a

Pavilhão do CODENM, Luanda

October 15, 2011
19:00 UTC+1

Report

1º de Agosto	101–80	Interclube
Scoring by quarter: 28-21, 22-14, 27-24, 24-21
Pts: R.Moore 27		Pts: F.Machado 22

Pavilhão do CODENM, Luanda

== Final standings ==
	Teams	Pl	W	L	PF	PA	Diff	P
1.	Primeiro de Agosto	3	3	0	300	208	+92	6
2.	Interclube	3	2	1	255	249	+6	5
3.	ASA	3	1	2	225	232	-7	4
4.	Universidade Lusíadas	3	0	3	178	269	-91	3

2011 Victorino Cunha Cup
Clube Desportivo Primeiro de Agosto
2nd title

== See also ==
- 2011 BAI Basket
- 2011 Angola Basketball Cup
- 2011 Angola Basketball Super Cup
