= 1999–2000 Angola Basketball Cup =

2000 Angola Basketball Cup
- League: Angola Basketball Cup
- Sport: Basketball
- Duration: February 23 – Apr 16, 2000
- Teams: 5
- TV partner: TPA1 (Angola) TPA Internacional (Worldwide) Supersport (Africa)

2000 Angola Basketball Cup
- Winners: Petro Atlético; Primeiro de Agosto A

Angola Basketball Cup seasons
- ← 1999 2001 →

== 2000 Men's Basketball Cup ==
The 2000 Men's Basketball Cup was contested by five teams and won by Petro Atlético. The final was played on April 16, 2000.

The 2000 Angola Women's Basketball Cup was contested by Primeiro de Agosto and Grupo Desportivo da Nocal, with Primeiro de Agosto winning the match and subsequently the trophy.

=== Preliminary round ===
Feb 23, 2000

Desp Nocal	65–54	Interclube

Pavilhão Anexo, Luanda

Feb 28, 2000

1º de Agosto	127–72	ANDU

Pavilhão do CODENM, Luanda

Apr 14, 2000

ASA	84–55	Sporting de Luanda

CPPL	vs.	Vila Clotilde

=== Semi-finals ===
Apr 10, 2000

Petro Atlético	81–86	ASA

Pavilhão Anexo, Luanda

Apr 12, 2000

1º de Agosto	72–85	Petro Atlético

Pavilhão do CODENM, Luanda

Apr 14, 2000

1º de Agosto	63–74	ASA

Pavilhão do CODENM, Luanda

=== Final ===
Apr 16, 2000

Petro Atlético	83–69	ASA

Pavilhão da Cidadela, Luanda

== 2000 Women's Basketball Cup ==
1º de Agosto	vs.	Desp Nocal

Pavilhão Anexo, Luanda

2000 Angola Men's Basketball Cup winner	2000 Angola Women's Basketball Cup winner
Atlético Petróleos de Luanda; 7th title	Clube Desportivo Primeiro de Agosto; 2nd title

== See also ==
- 2000 Angola Basketball Super Cup
- 2000 BAI Basket
