= 2015 FIBA Africa Women's Clubs Champions Cup squads =

This article displays the rosters for the participating teams at the 2015 FIBA Africa Club Championship for Women.

== (Burundi) Berco Stars ==
Berco Stars – 2015 FIBA Africa Women's Clubs Champions Cup – 9th place roster
| Players | | | | | | | Coaches |
| Pos | # | Nat | Name | Height | Weight | Age | Head coach |
| | 4 | (Burundi) | Ghyslaine Gakima | | | 1 January 1987 (aged 28) | (Burundi) Patrick Ngwijuruvugo |
| | 5 | (Burundi) | Pascasie Bucumi | | | 13 March 1987 (aged 28) |
| | 6 | (Burundi) | Larissa Kantungeko | | | 1 January 1986 (aged 29) | Assistant coach(es) |
| | 7 | (Burundi) | Florence Kalume | | | 22 December 1990 (aged 24) |
| | 8 | (Burundi) | Geraldine Iradukunda | | | 27 April 1992 (aged 23) |
| | 9 | (Burundi) | Nadia Mugisha | | | 22 March 1987 (aged 28) |
| | 10 | (Burundi) | Belyse Gateka | | | 16 June 1988 (aged 27) |
| | 11 | (Burundi) | Belyse Haringanji | | | 9 March 1992 (aged 23) |
| | 12 | (Burundi) | Nancy Hicintuka | | | 14 August 1992 (aged 23) |
| | 13 | (Burundi) | Inès Nezerwa | | | 2 December 1993 (aged 22) |
| | 14 | (Burundi) | Nancy Inarukundo | | | 13 May 1988 (aged 27) |
| | 15 | (Burundi) | Nadège Iziguriza | | | 13 November 1992 (aged 23) |

== (Nigeria) Dolphins ==
Dolphins – 2015 FIBA Africa Women's Clubs Champions Cup – 5th place roster
| Players | | | | | | | Coaches |
| Pos | # | Nat | Name | Height | Weight | Age | Head coach |
| | 4 | (Nigeria) | Tokunbo Olaosebikan (C) | 1.60 m (5 ft 3 in) | 46 kg (101 lb) | 27 January 1991 (aged 24) | (Nigeria) Okworogun Joy |
| | 5 | (Nigeria) | Mary Isuambuk | | | 1 September 1994 (aged 21) |
| | 6 | (Nigeria) | Patience Okpe | 1.65 m (5 ft 5 in) | | 28 August 1994 (aged 21) | Assistant coach(es) |
| | 7 | (Nigeria) | Nkoyo George | | | 30 April 1985 (aged 30) |
| | 9 | (Nigeria) | Chinwe Okah | | | 13 October 1996 (aged 19) |
| | 10 | (Nigeria) | Juliet Currency | | | 16 July 1996 (aged 19) |
| | 11 | (Nigeria) | Tinuke Arowosafe | | | 25 September 1986 (aged 29) |
| | 12 | (Nigeria) | Bintu Bhadmus | 1.80 m (5 ft 11 in) | 75 kg (165 lb) | 10 November 1985 (aged 30) |
| | 13 | (Nigeria) | Grace Okonkwo | | | 20 October 1986 (aged 29) |
| | 14 | (Ivory Coast) | Minata Fofana | | | 22 March 1986 (aged 29) |
| | 15 | (Nigeria) | Ojoma Ewaoche | | | 27 October 1992 (aged 23) |

== (Mozambique) Ferroviário de Maputo ==
Ferroviário de Maputo – 2015 FIBA Africa Women's Clubs Champions Cup – Bronze medal roster
| Players | | | | | | | Coaches |
| Pos | # | Nat | Name | Height | Weight | Age | Head coach |
| | 4 | (Mozambique) | Carla Pinto | | | 13 August 1992 (aged 23) | (Mozambique) Leonel Manhique |
| | 5 | (Mozambique) | Vilma Covane | 1.88 m (6 ft 2 in) | | 10 October 1996 (aged 19) |
| | 6 | (Mozambique) | Ingvild Mucauro | 1.74 m (5 ft 8 1/2 in) | | 12 September 1992 (aged 23) | Assistant coach(es) |
| F | 7 | (Mozambique) | Rute Muianga | 1.77 m (5 ft 9 1/2 in) | | 6 April 1983 (aged 32) |
| | 8 | (Mozambique) | Ana Jaime | | | 6 December 1990 (aged 25) |
| | 9 | (Mozambique) | Dulce Mahgaia | | | 5 November 1988 (aged 27) |
| | 10 | (Nigeria) (United States) | Ndidi Madu | 1.88 m (6 ft 2 in) | | 13 March 1989 (aged 26) |
| | 11 | (Mozambique) | Ornélia Mutombene | 1.66 m (5 ft 5 1/2 in) | | 24 October 1990 (aged 25) |
| | 12 | (Nigeria) (United States) | Helen Ogunjimi | 1.70 m (5 ft 7 in) | | 26 October 1984 (aged 31) |
| | 13 | (Mozambique) | Dionilde Cuamba | 1.84 m (6 ft 1/2 in) | | 15 February 1993 (aged 22) |
| PF | 14 | (Mozambique) | Odélia Mafanela | 1.84 m (6 ft 1/2 in) | | 14 April 1989 (aged 26) |
| | 15 | (Mozambique) | Cecília Henriques | 1.83 m (6 ft 0 in) | | 24 August 1990 (aged 25) |

== (Nigeria) First Bank ==
First Bank – 2015 FIBA Africa Women's Clubs Champions Cup – 4th place roster
| Players | | | | | | | Coaches |
| Pos | # | Nat | Name | Height | Weight | Age | Head coach |
| | 4 | (Nigeria) (United States) | Rena Wakama | | | 11 April 1992 (aged 23) | (Nigeria) Peter Ahmedu |
| G | 5 | (Nigeria) | Upe Atosu | 1.65 m (5 ft 5 in) | | 21 April 1993 (aged 22) |
| | 6 | (Nigeria) | Deborah Nwakamma | | | 27 April 1997 (aged 18) | Assistant coach(es) |
| G | 7 | (Nigeria) (United States) | Joyce Ekworomadu | 1.77 m (5 ft 9 1/2 in) | | 6 August 1986 (aged 29) |
| | 8 | (Nigeria) | Nkechi Akashili | 1.75 m (5 ft 9 in) | | 22 February 1990 (aged 25) |
| | 9 | (Senegal) | Aya Traoré | 1.83 m (6 ft 0 in) | | 27 July 1983 (aged 32) |
| | 10 | (Nigeria) | Regina Iornumbe | | | 18 November 1994 (aged 21) |
| | 11 | (Mali) | Ramata Daou | 2.02 m (6 ft 7 1/2 in) | | 23 March 1988 (aged 27) |
| | 12 | (Nigeria) | Nkem Akaraiwe | 1.85 m (6 ft 1 in) | | 22 December 1996 (aged 18) |
| | 13 | (Nigeria) | Juliet Chinyere | | | 1 November 1993 (aged 22) |
| C | 14 | (Nigeria) | Priscilla Udeaja | 1.91 m (6 ft 3 in) | | 29 June 1984 (aged 31) |
| | 15 | (Nigeria) | Odion Elawure | | | 26 May 1995 (aged 20) |

== (Cameroon) INJS ==
INJS – 2015 FIBA Africa Women's Clubs Champions Cup – 7th place roster
| Players | | | | | | | Coaches |
| Pos | # | Nat | Name | Height | Weight | Age | Head coach |
| | 4 | (Cameroon) | Caroline Doun | | | 19 August 1983 (aged 32) | (Cameroon) Souleyman Munyutu |
| | 5 | (Cameroon) | Chantal Ebelle | | | 14 October 1991 (aged 24) |
| | 6 | (Cameroon) | Astrid Njiogap | 1.74 m (5 ft 8 1/2 in) | | 23 August 1988 (aged 27) | Assistant coach(es) |
| | 7 | (Cameroon) | Tatiana Poutong | | | 2 June 1991 (aged 24) |
| | 8 | (Cameroon) | Heléne Metemo | | | 21 May 1993 (aged 22) |
| | 9 | (Cameroon) | Priscilla Mbiandja | 1.73 m (5 ft 8 in) | | 20 February 1989 (aged 26) |
| | 10 | (Cameroon) | Ange Tsafack | | | 5 November 1993 (aged 22) |
| | 11 | (Cameroon) | Brassine Nkeumo | | | 4 July 1985 (aged 30) |
| | 12 | (Cameroon) | Sandrine Ayangma | 1.74 m (5 ft 8 1/2 in) | | 25 October 1986 (aged 29) |
| | 13 | (Cameroon) | Jessica Njoya | | | 12 February 1993 (aged 22) |
| | 14 | (Cameroon) | Duchelle Tiomo | | | 2 March 1989 (aged 26) |
| | 15 | (Cameroon) | Josiane Nakoua | | | 19 August 1983 (aged 32) |

== (Democratic Republic of the Congo) I.N.S.S. ==
I.N.S.S. – 2015 FIBA Africa Women's Clubs Champions Cup – 6th place roster
| Players | | | | | | | Coaches |
| Pos | # | Nat | Name | Height | Weight | Age | Head coach |
| | 4 | (Democratic Republic of the Congo) | Evodie Longa | | | 20 May 1995 (aged 20) | (Democratic Republic of the Congo) Vale Mosengo |
| | 5 | (Democratic Republic of the Congo) | Caty Muna | | | 12 November 1988 (aged 27) |
| | 6 | (Democratic Republic of the Congo) | Naura Balongya | | | 16 November 1994 (aged 21) | Assistant coach(es) |
| | 7 | (Democratic Republic of the Congo) | Monique Kanku | | | 25 December 1982 (aged 32) |
| F | 8 | (Democratic Republic of the Congo) | Cecile Nyoka | 1.77 m (5 ft 9 1/2 in) | | 18 September 1986 (aged 29) |
| | 9 | (Democratic Republic of the Congo) | Natacha Teba | | | 28 May 1992 (aged 23) |
| | 10 | (Democratic Republic of the Congo) | Ortice Haongi | | | 10 October 1987 (aged 28) |
| | 11 | (Democratic Republic of the Congo) | Gina Tebapale | | | 16 October 1981 (aged 34) |
| | 12 | (Democratic Republic of the Congo) | Olga Mpiana | | | 23 September 1992 (aged 23) |
| | 13 | (Democratic Republic of the Congo) | Biatshini Ngokas | | | 8 August 1991 (aged 24) |
| | 14 | (Democratic Republic of the Congo) | La Mama Maweja | | | 26 July 1997 (aged 18) |
| | 15 | (Democratic Republic of the Congo) | Christine Mitschiabu (C) | | | 24 July 1994 (aged 21) |

== (Angola) Interclube ==
G.D. Interclube – 2015 FIBA Africa Women's Clubs Champions Cup – Silver medal roster
| Players | | | | | | | Coaches |
| Pos | # | Nat | Name | Height | Weight | Age | Head coach |
| PG | 4 | (Angola) | Catarina Camufal | 1.68 m (5 ft 6 in) | | 30 March 1980 (aged 35) | (Angola) Manuel Sousa |
| SG | 6 | (Angola) (United States) | Italee Lucas | 1.73 m (5 ft 8 in) | | 12 January 1989 (aged 26) |
| G | 7 | (Angola) | Merciana Fernandes | 1.69 m (5 ft 6 1/2 in) | | 2 April 1992 (aged 23) | Assistant coach(es) |
| F | 8 | (Angola) | Rosemira Daniel | 1.72 m (5 ft 7 1/2 in) | | 24 October 1993 (aged 22) | (Angola) Elisa Pires |
| F | 10 | (United States) | Sequoia Holmes | 1.78 m (5 ft 10 in) | 70 kg (150 lb) | 13 June 1986 (aged 29) |
| PF | 11 | (Angola) | Ângela Cardoso | 1.80 m (5 ft 11 in) | | 9 April 1979 (aged 36) |
| PF | 12 | (Angola) | Nadir Manuel | 1.88 m (6 ft 2 in) | 79 kg (174 lb) | 30 November 1986 (aged 29) |
| SF | 13 | (Angola) | Felizarda Jorge | 1.72 m (5 ft 7 1/2 in) | 78 kg (172 lb) | 23 February 1985 (aged 30) |
| C | 14 | (Angola) | Angelina Golome | 1.92 m (6 ft 3 1/2 in) | | 23 March 1988 (aged 27) |
| PF | 15 | (Angola) | Ngiendula Filipe (C) | 1.80 m (5 ft 11 in) | 72 kg (159 lb) | 20 May 1982 (aged 33) |
| PG | 16 | (Angola) | Elsa Eduardo | 1.70 m (5 ft 7 in) | | 23 July 1989 (aged 26) |
| | 20 | (United States) | Breanna Salley | 1.80 m (5 ft 11 in) | | 18 December 1987 (aged 27) |

== (Uganda) KCC Leopards ==
KCC Leopards – 2015 FIBA Africa Women's Clubs Champions Cup – 11th place roster
| Players | | | | | | | Coaches |
| Pos | # | Nat | Name | Height | Weight | Age | Head coach |
| | 4 | (Uganda) | Flavia Oketcho | 1.70 m (5 ft 7 in) | | 16 July 1986 (aged 29) | (Uganda) Ayeet Odeke |
| | 5 | (Uganda) | Monica Siima | 1.73 m (5 ft 8 in) | | 29 July 1976 (aged 39) |
| | 6 | (Uganda) | Caroline Nantalo | | | 28 July 1986 (aged 29) | Assistant coach(es) |
| | 7 | (Uganda) | Halima Nabasumba | | | 17 December 1991 (aged 23) |
| | 8 | (Uganda) | Caroline Nyafwono | | | 15 February 1986 (aged 29) |
| | 9 | (Uganda) | Rebecca Akullo | 1.78 m (5 ft 10 in) | | 28 May 1983 (aged 32) |
| | 10 | (Uganda) | Babra Gimbo | | | 25 November 1994 (aged 21) |
| | 11 | (Uganda) | Chemutai Sokuton | | | 11 January 1993 (aged 22) |
| | 12 | (Uganda) | Jackline Baingana | | | 14 June 1991 (aged 24) |
| | 14 | (Uganda) | Muhayimina Namuwaya | 1.83 m (6 ft 0 in) | | 1 January 1988 (aged 27) |
| | 15 | (Uganda) | Martha Soigi | 1.85 m (6 ft 1 in) | | 18 December 1986 (aged 28) |

== (Angola) CD Maculusso ==
CD Maculusso – 2015 FIBA Africa Women's Clubs Champions Cup – 12th place roster
| Players | | | | | | | Coaches |
| Pos | # | Nat | Name | Height | Weight | Age | Head coach |
| | 4 | (Angola) | Nelma Avelino | | | 10 July 1998 (aged 17) | (Angola) Fernando Sapalo |
| | 5 | (Angola) | Analzira Américo | | | 17 June 1993 (aged 22) |
| | 6 | (Angola) | Pascalina Dias | | | 13 September 1992 (aged 23) | Assistant coach(es) |
| | 7 | (Angola) | Ruth Paím | | | 11 July 1996 (aged 19) |
| | 8 | (Angola) | Elisabeth Mateus | | | 30 July 1993 (aged 22) |
| | 10 | (Angola) | Joana Baptista | | | 30 March 1988 (aged 27) |
| | 11 | (Angola) | Maria Vunge | | | 4 April 1987 (aged 28) |
| | 12 | (Angola) | Feliciana Zuluca | | | 20 July 1994 (aged 21) |
| | 13 | (Angola) | Judith Bango | | | 24 October 1992 (aged 23) |
| | 14 | (Angola) | Maria Fula | | | 18 April 1994 (aged 21) |
| C | 15 | (Angola) | Cristina Matiquite | | | 12 March 1992 (aged 23) |
| | 16 | (Angola) | Nazaré João | | | 5 April 1991 (aged 24) |

== (Angola) Primeiro de Agosto ==
Primeiro de Agosto – 2015 FIBA Africa Women's Clubs Champions Cup – Gold medal roster
| Players | | | | | | | Coaches |
| Pos | # | Nat | Name | Height | Weight | Age | Head coach |
| PG | 4 | (Angola) | Fineza Eusébio (C) | 1.68 m (5 ft 6 in) | 70 kg (150 lb) | 18 July 1990 (aged 25) | (Angola) Jaime Covilhã |
| F | 5 | (Portugal) (Angola) | Letícia André | 1.76 m (5 ft 9 1/2 in) | | 11 December 1989 (aged 25) |
| PF | 6 | (Mozambique) | Leia Dongue | 1.85 m (6 ft 1 in) | | 24 May 1991 (aged 24) | Assistant coach(es) |
| SG | 7 | (Angola) | Rosa Gala | 1.73 m (5 ft 8 in) | 62 kg (137 lb) | 17 April 1995 (aged 20) | (Angola) Jaqueline Francisco |
| PG | 8 | (Angola) | Isabel Francisco | 1.66 m (5 ft 5 1/2 in) | 65 kg (143 lb) | 21 July 1980 (aged 35) |
| F | 9 | (Angola) | Indira José | 1.74 m (5 ft 8 1/2 in) | | 1 March 1985 (aged 30) |
| F | 10 | (Angola) | Sónia Guadalupe | 1.88 m (6 ft 2 in) | 77 kg (170 lb) | 15 September 1985 (aged 30) |
| C | 11 | (Angola) | Luísa Tomás | 1.92 m (6 ft 3 1/2 in) | 82 kg (181 lb) | 24 March 1983 (aged 32) |
| PF | 13 | (Angola) | Nacissela Maurício | 1.86 m (6 ft 1 in) | 80 kg (180 lb) | 2 June 1980 (aged 35) |
| SF | 14 | (Angola) | Ana Gonçalves | 1.82 m (5 ft 11 1/2 in) | 79 kg (174 lb) | 3 January 1993 (aged 22) |
| F | 15 | (Angola) | Marinela Muxiri | 1.86 m (6 ft 1 in) | | 6 July 1985 (aged 30) |
| C | 18 | (Senegal) | Maimouna Diarra | 1.98 m (6 ft 6 in) | | 30 January 1991 (aged 24) |

== (Democratic Republic of the Congo) Radi ==
Radi – 2015 FIBA Africa Women's Clubs Champions Cup – 8th place roster
| Players | | | | | | | Coaches |
| Pos | # | Nat | Name | Height | Weight | Age | Head coach |
| | 4 | (Democratic Republic of the Congo) | Sandrine Ilunga | | | 17 November 1996 (aged 19) | (Democratic Republic of the Congo) Manix Lolango |
| | 5 | (Democratic Republic of the Congo) | Ukete Lukokesha | | | 24 April 1981 (aged 34) |
| | 6 | (Democratic Republic of the Congo) | Gracia Nguz | | | 29 June 1992 (aged 23) | Assistant coach(es) |
| | 7 | (Democratic Republic of the Congo) | Fara Mukunday | | | 4 July 1990 (aged 25) |
| | 8 | (Democratic Republic of the Congo) | Florence Ntumba | | | 6 January 1995 (aged 20) |
| | 9 | (Democratic Republic of the Congo) | Jeanine Kalombo | | | 16 February 1984 (aged 31) |
| | 10 | (Democratic Republic of the Congo) | Mireille Nyota | | | 2 February 1990 (aged 25) |
| | 11 | (Democratic Republic of the Congo) | Gracia Mukadi | | | 20 June 1998 (aged 17) |
| | 12 | (Democratic Republic of the Congo) | Felekeni Bamati | | | 25 December 1979 (aged 35) |
| | 13 | (Democratic Republic of the Congo) | Nicole Mubalo | | | 5 November 1992 (aged 23) |
| | 14 | (Democratic Republic of the Congo) | Maguy Miwo | | | 11 November 1996 (aged 19) |
| | 15 | (Democratic Republic of the Congo) | Marlène Matokio | | | 3 May 1995 (aged 20) |

== (Kenya) USIU Flames ==
USIU Flames – 2015 FIBA Africa Women's Clubs Champions Cup – 10th place roster
| Players | | | | | | | Coaches |
| Pos | # | Nat | Name | Height | Weight | Age | Head coach |
| | 4 | (Kenya) | Clarice Odhiambo | | | 10 August 1993 (aged 22) | (Kenya) George Mayienga |
| | 5 | (Kenya) | Doreen Nyagah | 1.65 m (5 ft 5 in) | 54 kg (119 lb) | 25 September 1993 (aged 22) |
| | 6 | (Kenya) | Lisa Mayienga | | | 17 May 1995 (aged 20) | Assistant coach(es) |
| | 7 | (Kenya) | Melissa Otieno | | | 3 July 1992 (aged 23) | (Kenya) Bonfas Salamo |
| | 10 | (Kenya) | Georgia Otieno | 1.65 m (5 ft 5 in) | 65 kg (143 lb) | 12 June 1992 (aged 23) |
| | 12 | (Burundi) | Cynthia Irankunda | 1.63 m (5 ft 4 in) | 61 kg (134 lb) | 19 September 1991 (aged 24) |
| | 13 | (Kenya) | Irene Atieno | | | 28 December 1994 (aged 20) |
| | 13 | (Kenya) | Cylia Ochieng | | | 11 August 1996 (aged 19) |
| | 14 | (Kenya) | Ruphina Akinyi | 1.68 m (5 ft 6 in) | 85 kg (187 lb) | 2 June 1993 (aged 22) |
| | 15 | (South Sudan) | Zeinab Chan | 1.93 m (6 ft 4 in) | | 26 April 1986 (aged 29) |
| | 16 | (Kenya) | Hilda Indasi | 1.68 m (5 ft 6 in) | 58 kg (128 lb) | 18 May 1985 (aged 30) |
| | 21 | (Kenya) | Maureen Andalia | | | 12 April 1987 (aged 28) |

== See also ==
- 2015 FIBA Africa Championship for Women squads
