= 2016–17 Angola Basketball Cup =

2016 Angola Basketball Cup
- League: Angola Basketball Cup
- Sport: Basketball
- Duration: February 29 – April 22
- Teams: 11
- TV partners: TPA1 (Angola); TPA Internacional (Worldwide)

2016 Angola Basketball Cup

Angola Basketball Cup seasons
- ← 2016 2018 →

The Angola basketball cup is the second most important nationwide annual basketball competition in Angola.

In the preliminary stage, six teams contested in a 2-leg head-to-head playoff with the winners joining the remaining five "higher-ranked" teams for the quarter-finals, at which stage, the eight teams will compete in a two-leg knock out play-off, followed by a two-leg semifinal. The final will be played in a single match.

== 2017 Angola Men's Basketball Cup ==
=== Preliminary rounds ===
29 February 2016
Interclube	78 : 56	Progresso
Progresso	:	Interclube
29 February 2016
Marinha	78 : 66	Lusíada
Lusíada	:	Marinha
29 February 2016
Sporting do Bié	75 : 102	Vila Clotilde
Vila Clotilde	:	Sporting do Bié

=== Final round ===
Quarter-finals (Apr 3, 11, 2017)
Progresso	57	67	124
Rec do Libolo	84	100	184
1º de Agosto	108	97	205
Marinha	57	70	127
Interclube	76	86	162
Petro de Luanda	79	80	159
Lusíada	53
ASA	78

Semi-finals (Apr 18, 25, 2017)
Rec do Libolo	94	87	181
1º de Agosto	83	96	179
Interclube	88	75	163
ASA	59	79	138

Final (May 13, 2017)
Rec do Libolo	82
Interclube	71

=== Final ===
Sat, 13 May 2017
19:00 UTC+1

Rec do Libolo	82–71	Interclube
Scoring by quarter: 17-26, 22-18, 22-18, 21-9
Pts: Mingas 18; Rebs: Mingas 13; Asts: Foster 4		Pts: Gerson 22; Rebs: Kiala 11; Asts: Gerson 4

Multiusos do Kilamba, Luanda

2017 Angola Men's Basketball Cup winner

5th title

Team roster: Andre Harris, Benvindo Quimbamba, Eduardo Mingas, Elmer Félix, Je'Kel Foster, Jorge Tati, Joseny Joaquim, Manda João, Mílton Barros, Olímpio Cipriano, Roberto Fortes, Valdelício Joaquim.
Head coach: Hugo López

== 2017 Angola Women's Basketball Cup ==
Semifinals (June 20/21, 2017)
Interclube	81	71	152
Maculusso	51	68	119
1º de Agosto	74	76	150
Inter de Benguela	35	23	58

Final (June 22, 2017)
Interclube	65
1º de Agosto	58

Thu, 22 Jun 2017
18:00 UTC+1

Interclube	65–58	1º de Agosto
Scoring by quarter: 19-18, 19-10, 19-13, 8-17
Pts: Pauline 16; Rebs: Pauline 6 Asts: Italee 5		Pts: Leia 24; Rebs: Leia 15; Asts: Elizabeth 2

Multiusos do Kilamba, Luanda

2017 Angola Women's Basketball Cup winner

6th title

Team roster: Angelina Golome, Astrida Vicente, Emanuela Mateus, Felizarda Jorge, Italee Lucas, Luzia Simão, Merciana Fernandes, Nadir Manuel, Ngiendula Filipe, Pauline Nsimbo, Rosemira Daniel, Sequoia Holmes
Head coach: Apolinário Paquete

== See also ==
- 2017 Angola Basketball Super Cup
- 2016 BIC Basket
- 2017 Victorino Cunha Cup
