= 2015–16 Angola Basketball Cup =

2016 Angola Basketball Cup
- League: Angola Basketball Cup
- Sport: Basketball
- Duration: February 29 – April 22
- Teams: 11
- TV partners: TPA1 (Angola); TPA Internacional (Worldwide)

2016 Angola Basketball Cup

Angola Basketball Cup seasons
- ← 2015 2017 →

The Angola basketball cup is the second most important nationwide annual basketball competition in Angola.

In the preliminary stage, six teams contested in a 2-leg head-to-head playoff with the winners joining the remaining five "higher-ranked" teams for the quarter finals, at which stage, the eight teams will compete in a two-leg knock out play-off, followed by a two-leg semifinal. The final will be played in a single match. Recreativo do Libolo successfully defended its title beating Petro de Luanda in the final 105-95.

== 2016 Angola Men's Basketball Cup ==
=== Preliminary rounds ===
29 February 2016
| Interclube | 78 : 56 | Progresso |
| Progresso | : | Interclube |
29 February 2016
| Marinha | 78 : 66 | Lusíada |
| Lusíada | : | Marinha |
29 February 2016
| Sporting do Bié | 75 : 102 | Vila Clotilde |
| Vila Clotilde | : | Sporting do Bié |

=== Final round ===
Quarter-finals (Mar 15, 22, 2016)
Petro Atlético | 94 | 83 | 177
Interclube | 65 | 102 | 167
ASA | 98 | 91 | 189
Heja SC | 44 | 42 | 86
Rec do Libolo | 99 | 91 | 190
F.C. Vila Clotilde | 64 | 73 | 137
1º de Agosto | 83 | 86 | 169
Marinha | 68 | 76 | 144

Semi-finals (Apr 5, 12, 2016)
Petro Atlético | 107 | 100 | 207
ASA | 65 | 75 | 140
Rec do Libolo | 101 | 70 | 171
1º de Agosto | 94 | 68 | 162

Final (Apr 22, 2016)
Petro Atlético | 95
Rec do Libolo | 105

Fri 22 Apr 2016
19:00 UTC+1

| Rec do Libolo | 105–95 | Petro Atlético |
Scoring by quarter: 22-21, 34-28, 22-24, 27-22
| Pts: Valdelício 21; Rebs: Mingas 8 Asts: Wallace 4 | | Pts: Quezada 33; Rebs: Cain 7 Asts: Quezada 5 |

Pavilhão da Cidadela, Luanda

2016 Angola Men's Basketball Cup winner

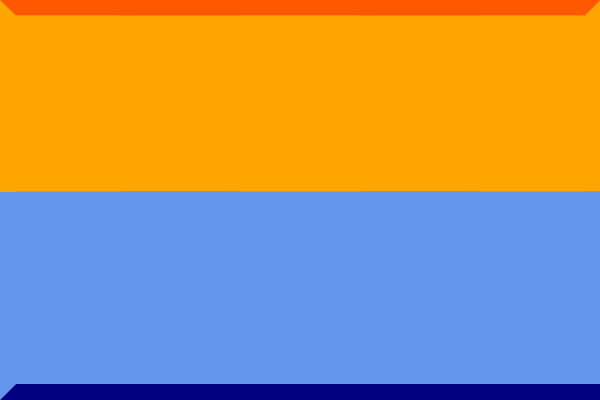

Clube Recreativo Desportivo do Libolo
4th title

== 2016 Angola Women's Basketball Cup ==
The 2016 Angolan Women's Basketball Cup is an upcoming event to be held from July 6–10, 2016. The semifinals will take place July 6 and 8, while the finals will take place July 10.

Semifinals (July 06/08, 2016)
Interclube | 75 | 64 | 139
Maculusso | 39 | 49 | 88
1º de Agosto | 76 | 64 | 140
Inter de Benguela | 28 | 41 | 69

Final (July 10, 2016)
Interclube | 54
1º de Agosto | 48

2016 Angola Women's Basketball Cup winner

Grupo Desportivo Interclube
5th title

== See also ==
- 2016 Angola Basketball Super Cup
- 2016 BIC Basket
- 2016 Victorino Cunha Cup
