= 2014–15 Angola Basketball Cup =

2015 Angola Basketball Cup
- League: Angola Basketball Cup
- Sport: Basketball
- Duration: March 10 – April 10
- Teams: 8
- TV partners: TPA1 (Angola); TPA Internacional (Worldwide); Supersport (Africa)

2015 Angola Basketball Cup

Angola Basketball Cup seasons
- ← 2014 2016 →

The Angola basketball cup is the second most important nationwide annual basketball competition in Angola. The final stage of the 2015 edition for men (quarterfinals) ran from March 10 to April 10, 2015 and was contested by eight teams in a two-leg knock out competition system, followed by a two-leg semifinal. The final was played in a single match. Recreativo do Libolo was the winner by beating Primeiro de Agosto 79-70 in the final.

== 2015 Angola Men's Basketball Cup ==
=== Final round ===
Quarter-finals (Mar 10, 17, 2015)
Rec do Libolo	20	–	20
Sporting de Benguela	0	–	0
Sporting do Bié	85	68	153
Progresso	111	110	221
1º de Agosto	106	110	216
ASA	88	81	169
Interclube	90	76	166
Petro Atlético	86	94	180

Semi-finals (Mar 31, Apr 3, 2015)
Rec do Libolo	107	103	210
Progresso	70	54	124
1º de Agosto	99	103	202
Petro Atlético	71	96	167

Final (Apr 10, 2015)
Rec do Libolo	79
1º de Agosto	70

== 2015 Angola Women's Basketball Cup ==
Semi-finals (8 Jun 2015)
1º de Agosto	88
Un. Lusíada	31
Interclube	52
Maculusso	21

Final (14 Jun 2015)
1º de Agosto	62
Interclube	50

Sun 14 Jun 2015
18:00 UTC+1

1º de Agosto	62–50	Interclube
Scoring by quarter: 21-12, 10-7, 17-12, 14-19
Pts: n/a		Pts: Lucas 19

Pavilhão da Cidadela, Luanda

2015 Angola Men's Basketball Cup winner	2015 Angola Women's Basketball Cup winner
Clube Recreativo e Desportivo do Libolo; 3rd title	Clube Desportivo Pimeiro de Agosto; 14th title

== See also ==
- 2015 Angola Basketball Super Cup
- 2015 BIC Basket
- 2015 Victorino Cunha Cup
