= Basketball at the 2014 Lusofonia Games – Women's team rosters =

Basketball at the 2014 Lusophony Games Women's team rosters

This article displays the rosters for the participating teams at the 2014 Lusophony Games.

== Angola ==
Angola women's national basketball team – 2014 Lusophony Games – Silver Medal roster
Players
Coaches

| Pos. | No. | Name | Age – Date of birth | Height | Club | Ctr. |
|---|---|---|---|---|---|---|
| | 4 | Letícia André | 24 – 12 November 1989 |
| | 5 | Helena Francisco | 20 – 1 August 1993 |
| | 6 | Angelina Golome | 25 – 23 March 1988 | | Interclube | (Angola) |
| | 7 | Elsa Eduardo | 24 – 23 July 1989 | | Desp Maculusso | (Angola) |
| | 8 | Judith Queta | 28 – 29 August 1985 | | Interclube | (Angola) |
| | 9 | Merciana Fernandes | 21 – 2 April 1992 | | Desp Maculusso | (Angola) |
| | 10 | Analzira Américo | 20 – 17 June 1993 |
| | 11 | Rosemira Daniel | 20 – 24 October 1993 |
| | 12 | Madalena Valentim | 20 – 1 April 1993 |
| | 13 | Ana Gonçalves | 21 – 3 January 1993 | 1.80 m (5 ft 11 in) | Primeiro de Agosto | (Angola) |
| | 14 | Rosa Gala | 18 – 17 April 1995 | | Primeiro de Agosto | (Angola) |
| | 15 | Cristina Matiquite | 21 – 12 March 1992 |

Head coach

- (Angola) Elisa Pires

Assistant coach

Legend

- (C) Team captain
- Club field describes current club

== India ==
India women's national basketball team – 2014 Lusophony Games – Bronze Medal roster
Players
Coaches

| Pos. | No. | Name | Age – Date of birth | Height | Club | Ctr. |
|---|---|---|---|---|---|---|
| F | 4 | Jeena Skaria | 20 – 9 January 1994 | 1.79 m (5 ft 10 in) |
| C | 5 | R. Rajaganapathi | 20 – 3 January 1994 | 1.85 m (6 ft 1 in) |
| F | 6 | Stephy Nixon | 21 – 6 June 1992 | 1.83 m (6 ft 0 in) |
| | 7 | Ishwari Pingle | 17 – 7 August 1996 |
| G | 8 | Shireen Limaye | 18 – 13 February 1995 | 1.80 m (5 ft 11 in) |
| | 9 | Nelvie Mendes | 24 – 8 January 1990 |
| F | 10 | Sharanjeet Kaur | 18 – 10 January 1996 | 1.60 m (5 ft 3 in) |
| | 11 | Pooja Mol K.S. | – |
| F | 12 | Smruthi Radhakrishman | 21 – 15 April 1992 | 1.75 m (5 ft 9 in) |
| | 13 | Preeti Kumari | 17 – 1 July 1996 |
| | 14 | Kezia Fernandes | 19 – 24 March 1994 |
| | 15 | Neenumol P.S. | 21 – 25 May 1992 |

Head coach

- (Cuba) Francisco Garcia

Assistant coach

Legend

- (C) Team captain
- Club field describes current club

== Macau ==
Macau women's national basketball team – 2014 Lusophony Games – 4th place roster
Players
Coaches

| Pos. | No. | Name | Age – Date of birth | Height | Club | Ctr. |
|---|---|---|---|---|---|---|
| | 4 | Mak I Tong | 20 – 22 October 1993 | 1.65 m (5 ft 5 in) |
| | 5 | Lio Hong In | 18 – 16 July 1995 | 1.61 m (5 ft 3 in) |
| | 6 | Leong Fong Mui | 20 – 26 March 1993 | 1.64 m (5 ft 5 in) |
| | 7 | Chan Man Kei | 20 – 5 March 1993 | 1.70 m (5 ft 7 in) |
| | 8 | Ng Ka Ian | 21 – 14 March 1992 | 1.58 m (5 ft 2 in) |
| | 9 | Lok Hang I | 21 – 16 July 1992 | 1.67 m (5 ft 6 in) |
| | 10 | Chan Ka I | 19 – 17 June 1994 | 1.68 m (5 ft 6 in) |
| | 11 | Ng Hio Tong | 18 – 14 April 1995 | 1.71 m (5 ft 7 in) |
| | 12 | Sou Chi Cheng | 19 – 21 November 1994 | 1.63 m (5 ft 4 in) |
| | 13 | Tam On U | 20 – 12 August 1993 | 1.63 m (5 ft 4 in) |
| | 14 | Tong Chao Ha | 21 – 18 October 1992 | 1.57 m (5 ft 2 in) |
| | 15 | Lam Ka Wai | 16 – 14 January 1998 | 1.65 m (5 ft 5 in) |

Head coach

Assistant coach

Legend

- (C) Team captain
- Club field describes current club

== Mozambique ==
Mozambique women's national basketball team – 2014 Lusophony Games – Gold Medal roster
Players
Coaches

| Pos. | No. | Name | Age – Date of birth | Height | Club | Ctr. |
|---|---|---|---|---|---|---|
| G | 4 | Valerdina Manhonga | 33 – 26 December 1980 | 1.68 m (5 ft 6 in) |
| G | 5 | Deolinda Ngulela | 32 – 18 April 1981 | 1.70 m (5 ft 7 in) |
| F | 6 | Ana Azinheira | 36 – 8 February 1977 | 1.84 m (6 ft 0 in) |
| G | 7 | Anabela Cossa | 27 – 7 April 1986 | 1.72 m (5 ft 8 in) |
| | 8 | Amélia Macamo | 28 – 23 September 1985 |
| G | 9 | Iliana Ventura | 23 – 14 February 1990 | 1.68 m (5 ft 6 in) |
| F | 10 | Filomena Micato | 28 – 26 January 1986 | 1.68 m (5 ft 6 in) |
| C | 11 | Leia Dongue | 22 – 24 May 1991 | 1.85 m (6 ft 1 in) | Primeiro de Agosto | (Angola) |
| F | 12 | Rute Muianga | 30 – 6 April 1983 | 1.75 m (5 ft 9 in) |
| | 13 | Ilda Chambe | 26 – 19 April 1987 |
| F | 14 | Odélia Mafanela | 24 – 14 April 1989 | 1.80 m (5 ft 11 in) |
| C | 15 | Deolinda Gimo | 26 – 15 August 1987 | 1.90 m (6 ft 3 in) | Primeiro de Agosto | (Angola) |

Head coach

- (Mozambique) Nazir Salé

Assistant coach

Legend

- (C) Team captain
- Club field describes current club
