= 2014 Victorino Cunha Cup =

- League: Victorino Cunha Cup
- Sport: Basketball
- Duration: October 13–18
- Teams: 5
- TV partner: TPA2 (Angola) TPA Internacional (Worldwide) Supersport (Africa)

Victorino Cunha Cup season
- Winner: Primeiro de Agosto
- Runners-up: SAGU Lions
- Season MVP: (United States) Steve Briggs
- Top scorer: (United States) Quintrell Thomas

Victorino Cunha Cup seasons
- ← 2013 2015 →

The Victorino Cunha Cup is an annual Angolan basketball tournament held in honour of former Angolan basketball coach Victorino Cunha. The 6th edition (2014), took place at the Pavilhão da Cidadela, from October 13 to 18, 2014 and was contested by four local teams and included for the first time a foreign team. The tournament, played in a round robin system was won by Primeiro de Agosto.

== Schedule ==
=== Day 1 ===
October 13, 2014
17:00 UTC+1

[]

ASA (Angola)	69–80	(Angola) Interclube
Pts: Y.Suingue 15; Rebs: Z.Paulo 6 Asts: Y.Suingue 3		Pts: Thomas 21; Rebs: Thomas 11; Asts: J.Tati 3

Pavilhão da Cidadela, Luanda

19:00 UTC+1

Report

1º de Agosto (Angola)	81–77	(Angola) Petro Atlético
Scoring by quarter: 24-13, 16-14, 25-31, 16-19
Pts: three players 15		Pts: Leonel 15

Pavilhão da Cidadela, Luanda

=== Day 2 ===
October 14, 2014
17:00 UTC+1

Report

ASA (Angola)	57–97	(Angola) 1º de Agosto
Scoring by quarter: 11-20, 21-33, 10-18, 15-26
Pts: Quicuambi 18; Rebs: Quicuambi 7 Asts: Mariano, Suingue 3		Pts: Kikas 20; Rebs: Cissé 8 Asts: Armando 5

Pavilhão da Cidadela, Luanda
Referees: D. Manuel, F. Pacheco, D. Figueira

19:00 UTC+1

[]

SAGU Lions (United States)	71–75	(Angola) Petro Atlético
Scoring by quarter: 16-20, 15-18, 15-20, 25-17
Pts: Briggs 23; Rebs: Gentry 6 Asts: Gentry 7		Pts: n/a Rebs: Kiala 12; Asts: n/a

Pavilhão da Cidadela, Luanda

=== Day 3 ===
October 16, 2014
17:00 UTC+1

[]

SAGU Lions (United States)	85–74	(Angola) ASA

Pavilhão da Cidadela, Luanda

19:00 UTC+1

Report

Interclube (Angola)	66–68	(Angola) 1º de Agosto
Scoring by quarter: 17-25, 12-6, 16-18, 21-19
Pts: Thomas 21; Rebs: Thomas 9 Asts: E.António 4		Pts: Moore 19; Rebs: Armando, Mutu 5 Asts: Armando 4

Pavilhão da Cidadela, Luanda

=== Day 4 ===
October 17, 2014
17:00 UTC+1

[]

Petro Atlético (Angola)	89–85	(Angola) ASA
Pts: Fortes 20; Rebs: L.Paulo 9 Asts: L.Paulo, Quinzinho 3		Pts: Quicuambi 19; Rebs: n/a Asts: n/a

Pavilhão da Cidadela, Luanda

19:00 UTC+1

Report

Interclube (Angola)	78–82	(United States) SAGU Lions
Scoring by quarter: 19-17, 23-20, 16-17, 20-28
Pts: Thomas 24; Rebs: Thomas 9		Pts: Briggs 18; Rebs: Walter 7

Pavilhão da Cidadela, Luanda

=== Day 5 ===
October 18, 2014
17:00 UTC+1

[]

Petro Atlético (Angola)	82–67	(Angola) Interclube

Pavilhão da Cidadela, Luanda

19:00 UTC+1

[]

1º de Agosto (Angola)	103–105 ()	(United States) SAGU Lions
Scoring by quarter: 22-22, 31-31, 18-22, 24-20, Overtime: 8-10
Pts: n/a Rebs: Kikas 10		Pts: Briggs 26; Rebs: Adoyi 8

Pavilhão da Cidadela, Luanda

== Final standings ==
	Teams	Pl	W	L	PF	PA	Diff	P
1.	(Angola) Primeiro de Agosto	4	3	1	349	305	+44	7
2.	(United States) SAGU Lions	4	3	1	343	330	+13	7
3.	(Angola) Petro Atlético	4	3	1	323	304	+19	7
4.	(Angola) Interclube	4	1	3	291	301	-10	5
5.	(Angola) ASA	4	0	4	285	351	-66	4

== Awards ==
(United States) Steve Briggs	(SAG)	MVP
(United States) Quintrell Thomas	(INT)	Top Scorer
(Angola) Miguel Kiala	(PET)	Top Rebounder

2014 Victorino Cunha Cup
Clube Desportivo Primeiro de Agosto
4th title

Most Valuable Player
(United States) Steve Briggs

== See also ==
- 2014 BAI Basket
- 2014 Angola Basketball Cup
- 2014 Angola Basketball Super Cup
