= 2007–08 Angola Basketball Cup =

2008 Angola Basketball Cup
- League: Angola Basketball Cup
- Sport: Basketball
- Duration: March 18 – April 26, 2008; March 5 – 12, 2008
- Teams: 4
- TV partner: TPA1 (Angola) TPA Internacional (Worldwide) Supersport (Africa)

2008 Angola Basketball Cup
- Winners: Primeiro de Agosto

Angola Basketball Cup seasons
- ← 2007 2009 →

== Men's tournament ==
The 2008 Men's Basketball Cup was contested by eight teams and won by Primeiro de Agosto. The final was played on April 23 and 26, 2008.

Quarter-finals (Mar 18, 25, 2008)
Petro Atlético | 75 | 66 | 141
1º de Agosto | 80 | 74 | 154
PROMADE
U. da Catumbela
ASA | 100 | 104 | 204
CDUAN | 71 | 86 | 157
Desp. Huíla | 81 | 76 | 157
Interclube | 94 | 106 | 200

Semi-finals (Apr 8, 16, 2008)
PROMADE | 57 | 75 | 132
1º de Agosto | 91 | 120 | 211
ASA | 80 | 89 | 169
Interclube | 70 | 73 | 143

Finals (Apr 23, 26, 2008)
1º de Agosto | 80 | 93 | 173
ASA | 73 | 61 | 134

== Women's tournament ==
The 2008 Women's Basketball Cup was also won by Primeiro de Agosto.

Semifinals (Mar 5, 6, 2008)
Primeiro de Agosto | 59 | 60 | 119
Interclube | 29 | 64 | 93
CDUAN | 55 | 43 | 98
Desportivo do Maculusso | 53 | 71 | 124

Final (Mar 10, 12, 2008)
Desportivo do Maculusso | 46 | 36 | 82
Primeiro de Agosto | 67 | 68 | 135

| 2008 Angola Men's Basketball Cup winner | 2008 Angola Women's Basketball Cup winner |
|---|---|
| Clube Desportivo Pimeiro de Agosto; 11th title | Clube Desportivo Pimeiro de Agosto; 10th title |

== See also ==
- 2008 Angola Basketball Super Cup
- 2008 BAI Basket
