= Raúl Duarte (basketball, born 1963) =

Angolan basketball coach

Petro de Luanda
- Position: Assistant coach
- League: Unitel Basket; BAL

Personal information
- Born: Luanda, Angola
- Coaching career: 1982–present

Career history

Coaching
- 1982–1987: Interclube (Women's U-18)
- 1987–1991: Interclube (Women's)
- 1992–2000: G.D. Nocal (Women's)
- 2000–2002: Interclube
- 2002–2005: Petro de Luanda
- 2007–2008: 1º de Agosto (Women's)
- 2008–2012: Recreativo do Libolo
- 2014–2017: Universidade Lusíada
- 2017–2020: Interclube
- 2022–present: Petro de Luanda (assistant)

Career highlights
- As head coach: 2× Angolan Cup winner (2003, 2004); Angolan League Coach of the Year (2004); 7× Angolan Women's League champion (1992–1996, 1998, 1999); As assistant coach: BAL champion (2024); Angolan League champion (2024)

Raúl Fragoso Ferreira Duarte, (born 1963) is an Angolan basketball coach. He has been a 5-time champion with Interclube's women's and a seven-time national champion with G.D. Nocal women's basketball teams.

From 2014, Duarte was the head coach of Universidade Lusíada's men's basketball team, where he stayed until 2017.

Duarte took over Interclube men's team for a second stint in 2019. He stayed on until his contract was terminated in May 2022.

In September 2022, Duarte became an assistant coach for Petro de Luanda, returning to the club after 18 years.
