= Taça Victorino Cunha =

- Organising body: Angolan Basketball Federation
- Founded: 2009
- First season: 2009
- Country: Angola
- Confederation: FIBA Africa
- Number of teams: 4
- Current champions: Primeiro de Agosto (9th title) (2021)
- Most championships: Primeiro de Agosto (9 titles)

The Taça Victorino Cunha (in English: Victorinho Cunha Cup) is an annual basketball tournament contested by Angolan basketball teams. The tournament was established in 2009, in honour of former Angolan basketball coach Victorino Cunha.

As of 2014, the tournament became an international event, with the participation of US SAG University Men's Basketball team.

== Victorino Cunha Cup winners ==
Season	Winner	Winning coach	Runners-up	Third place	Ref.
2009	Primeiro de Agosto	Luís Magalhães	Recreativo do Libolo	Interclube	
2010	Petro de Luanda	Alberto Babo	Recreativo do Libolo	Interclube	
2011	Primeiro de Agosto (2)	Paulo Macedo	Interclube	ASA	
2012	Primeiro de Agosto (3)	Paulo Macedo	Petro de Luanda	Recreativo do Libolo	
2013	Recreativo do Libolo	Norberto Alves	Primeiro de Agosto	Petro de Luanda	
2014	Primeiro de Agosto (4)	Paulo Macedo	(United States) SAGU Lions	Petro de Luanda	
2015	Primeiro de Agosto (5)	Ricard Casas	Interclube	ASA	
2016					
2017	Primeiro de Agosto (6)	Paulo Macedo	Petro de Luanda	Interclube	
2018	Primeiro de Agosto (7)	Paulo Macedo	Petro de Luanda	Interclube	
2019	Primeiro de Agosto (8)	Paulo Macedo	Petro de Luanda		
2020	Cancelled due to the COVID-19 pandemic				
2021	Primeiro de Agosto (9)	José Carlos Guimarães	Petro de Luanda	Interclube	

== Participation details (2009–2015) ==
P	Club	2009	2010	2011	2012	2013	2014	2015	Years	Gold medal	Silver medal	Bronze medal
1	(Angola) CD 1° de Agosto	2009	4	2011	2012	2013	2014	2015	7	5	1	0
2	(Angola) Recreativo do Libolo	2009	2010		2010	2013			4	1	2	1
3	(Angola) Petro de Luanda		2010		2012	2013	2014		4	1	1	2
4	(Angola) Interclube	2009	2010	2011	4	4	4	2015	7	0	2	2
5	(United States) SAGU Men's Basketball						2014		1	0	1	0
5	(Angola) ASA	4		2011			5	2015	4	0	0	2
6	(Angola) CD ULA			4				4	2	0	0	0

== Titles won ==
Club	Winners	Runners-up	Years winners
Primeiro de Agosto	9	1	2009, 2011, 2012, 2014, 2015, 2017, 2018, 2019, 2021
Recreativo do Libolo	1	2	2013
Petro de Luanda	1	5	2010

== See also ==
- Victorino Cunha
- BIC Basket
- Supertaça Compal
