= G.D. Juventude de Viana (basketball) =

Defunct basketball club in Angola

- Sport: Basketball
- Folded: 2014
- Location: Viana, Luanda, Angola
- Main sponsor: Mecanagro

The Grupo Desportivo Juventude de Viana is a former basket club from Angola, based in Luanda's satellite town of Viana. Following the club's failure to participate in the 2014 women's league and cup due to financial reasons, Mecanagro, the club's major sponsor, announced that the club's basketball department had been discontinued. In January 2014, Universidade Lusíada announced that it would take over Juventude de Viana's basketball athletes and technical staff to form the women's wing of its own club. Until then, Universidade Lusíada only competed in the men's category.

Juventude de Viana still competes in the sports of roller hockey and judo.
