= Pavilhão Anexo II =

State-owned indoor arena in Luanda, Angola

- Interactive map of Pavilhão Anexo II
- Location: Complexo Desportivo da Cidadela; Luanda
- Coordinates: 8.828251°S 13.254817°E
- Owner: State-owned
- Capacity: 1500
- Surface: Hardwood
- Scoreboard: Electronic

The Pavilhão Anexo II is an Angolan state-owned indoor arena located in Complexo Desportivo da Cidadela, Luanda. The arena, with a 1500-seat capacity, is the third to be built in the Cidadela Sports Compound, following the Pavilhão da Cidadela and the Pavilhão Anexo. It has a floating, hardwood flooring and is ready for such sports as Basketball, Handball, Volleyball and Roller Hockey.

== See also ==
- Pavilhão da Cidadela
- Pavilhão Anexo
