= Jaime Covilhã =

Angolan basketball coach

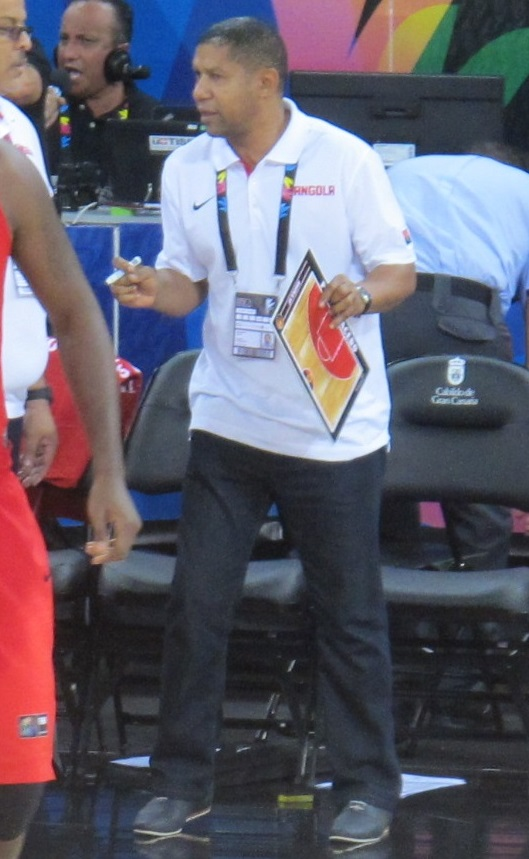
- Covilhã in 2014

Primeiro de Agosto
- League: BIC Basket; Africa Champions Cup

Personal information
- Born: November 13, 1963 (age 63) Luanda, Angola

Career history

Coaching
- 2000: Angola Women's
- 2006–2008: 1º de Agosto (M)
- 2011: Angola
- 2014–present: 1º de Agosto (W)
Medals
Angola
Coach for Men's Basketball
AfroBasket
Silver medal – second place	2011 Antananarivo	Angola
African Games
Gold medal – first place	2007 Algiers	Angola
FIBA Africa Clubs Champions Cup
Gold medal – first place	2004 Cairo	1º de Agosto
Gold medal – first place	2007 Luanda	1º de Agosto
Silver medal – second place	2006 Lagos	1º de Agosto
Coach for Women's Basketball
FIBA Africa Clubs Champions Cup
Gold medal – first place	Luanda 2015	1º de Agosto
Gold medal – first place	Luanda 2017	1º de Agosto
Silver medal – second place	Sfax 2014	1º de Agosto

Jaime Lages Covilhã (born November 13, 1962 in Luanda) is an Angolan basketball coach.

== 2011 AfroBasket ==
Perhaps, his most notorious act occurred during the 2011 Africa Basketball Championship when, amid the competition, assistant coach Covilhã replaced a highly challenged head coach Michel Gomez in a failed attempt to secure the title.

== See also ==
- Angola national basketball team
