= Fagec F.C. =

Grupo Desportivo da Expresso
- Leagues: Angolan Basketball League
- Founded: July 16, 1963 (62 years ago)
- History: 1963
- Arena: Pavilhão Anexo (capacity: 1,500)
- Location: Cazenga, Angola
- Team colors: white, maroon and black

Grupo Desportivo da Expresso, for sponsorship reasons also called Expresso Fagec F.C., is a multi-sports club in the city of Cazenga, Luanda Province, Angola. Its main sport is women's football, where it is one of the most successful teams in the country.

== History ==
The Grupo Desportivo da Nocal (GD Nocal) team was founded in 1963 as a team of workers at the Nocal brewery, during the period of the Portuguese colonial administration. In 2008, the brewery separated from GD Nocal, when the team changed its name to Grupo Desportivo da Expresso.

For a short period of time it adopted the name "Gira Jovem de Cazenga", when again it was called Expresso Fagec again. For sponsorship reasons it is also known as "Fagec F.C."

== Honours ==
Honours
League		No.	Years
Angola Women's Basketball League	Winner	1	1999
Angola Women's Basketball League	Runner-up	1	2000
Cups
Angola Cup	Winner	0	
Angola Cup	Runner-up	1	2000
Angola Super Cup	Winner	1	2000
Angola Super Cup	Runner-up	0	
FIBA Africa Competitions
African Champions Cup	Year		1997
African Champions Cup	Ranking		3rd

== Notable players ==
- Miguel Lutonda
- Filipe Abraão
- José Nascimento

== Former managers ==
- Raúl Duarte

== See also ==
- Angola Women's League
- Federação Angolana de Basquetebol
