= Victorino Cunha =

Angolan basketball coach

Personal information
- Born: 18 April 1945 (age 81) Mogofores, Portugal
- Coaching career: 1977–2002

Career history

Playing
- Benfica de Luanda
- CDUA

Coaching
- 1977–1988: 1º de Agosto
- 1986: Angola
- 1989–1994: Angola
- 2000–2002: Petro Atlético
Medals
Men's basketball
Representing Angola
AfroBasket
Gold medal – first place	Luanda 1989	Angola
Gold medal – first place	Cairo 1992	Angola
Gold medal – first place	Nairobi 1993	Angola

Victorino Eugénio da Silva e Cunha (born 18 April 1945 in Mogofores, Portugal) is a former basketball player and basketball coach. Although born in Portugal, he moved to Angola at the age of 3. Cunha, who coached the Angola National team to win three African titles, in 1989, 1992 and 1993, in addition to coaching the same team at the world championships in 1986, 1990 and 1994 and the 1992 Summer Olympics, is widely regarded as the forefather of Angolan basketball and the mastermind behind all the success achieved by the sports in Angola.

While losing 48-116 to the US Dream Team in the 1992 Summer Olympics may be considered normal due to the huge differences in both teams, Cunha is also remembered to have led Angola to an historical 20-point lead win over Spain, in the same tournament.

Cunha has served as a FIBA Africa instructor. As of 2009, an annual basketball tournament in Angola named Victorino Cunha Cup, has been established in his honour.

== See also ==
- Wlademiro Romero
- Victorino Cunha Cup
