= Pavilhão 28 de Fevereiro =

Coordinates: 8.82732086081669°S 13.24203553040803°E

- Interactive map of Pavilhão 28 de Fevereiro
- Location: Rua D. Manuel I (Behind the Fire Station)

Pavilhão 28 de Fevereiro is the Arena of Angolan side Interclube, mainly used for its Men's and Women's basketball teams. The arena is located at D. Manuel I street, Behind the fire brigade. The arena is named after Interclube's founding date.
