= Pavilhão Anexo =

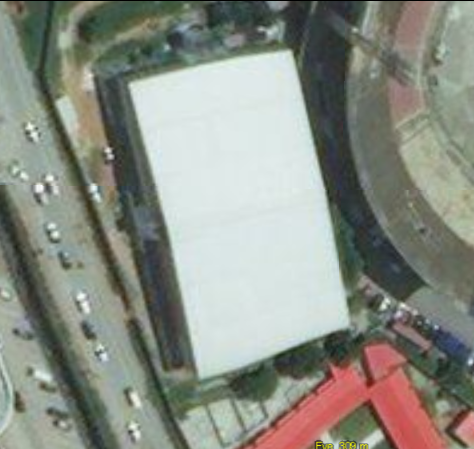
- Interactive map of Pavilhão Anexo
- Location: Complexo Desportivo da Cidadela; Luanda
- Coordinates: 8.827935°S 13.254742°E
- Owner: State-owned
- Capacity: 1500
- Surface: Hardwood
- Scoreboard: Electronic

The Pavilhão Anexo is an Angolan state-owned indoor arena located in Complexo Desportivo da Cidadela, Luanda. The arena, with a 1500-seat capacity, is the second to be built in the Cidadela Sports Compound, following the Pavilhão da Cidadela. It has a floating, hardwood flooring and electronic scoreboard and is ready for such sports as Basketball, Handball, Volleyball and Roller Hockey.

== See also ==
- Pavilhão da Cidadela
- Pavilhão Anexo II
