= C.D. Maculusso (basketball) =

Clube Desportivo O Maculusso
- Leagues: Angolan Basketball League
- Founded: August 15, 1982; 42 years ago
- History: 1982 - present
- Arena: Pavilhão Anexo (capacity: 1,500)
- Location: Luanda, Angola
- Team colors: white, maroon and black
- President: José Duarte Dias Paím
- Head coach: Fernando Figueiredo
- Website: http://www.maculusso.com/
Home	Away

The Clube Desportivo O Maculusso, formerly Club Desportivo Têxtil de Luanda, is an Angolan multisports club based in Luanda. Desportivo do Maculusso was named after its major sponsor, a textile factory in Luanda called Macambira. As the textile factory went out of business in 1999, the club was renamed after the neighborhood in which it was located, the neighborhood of Maculusso in Luanda. The club's women's basketball team competes at the local level, at the Luanda Provincial Basketball Championship and at the Angola Women's Basketball League.

== Honours ==
Honours		No.	Years
Leagues
Angola Women's League	Winner	0	
Angola Women's League	Runner-up	3	2001, 2004, 2005
Cups
Angola Cup	Winner	0	
Angola Cup	Runner-up	3	2001, 2005, 2011
Angola Super Cup	Winner	0	
Angola Super Cup	Runner-up	3	2006, 2009, 2012
FIBA Africa Club Competitions
African Champions Cup	Winner	0	
African Champions Cup	Runner-up	0	

== Roster ==
Note: Flags indicate national team eligibility at FIBA-sanctioned events. Players may hold other non-FIBA nationalities not displayed.

C.D. Maculusso Basketball roster
Players
Coaches

Pos.	No.	Nat.	Name	Ht.	Wt.	Age
G	5	(Angola)	Analzira Américo			31 – 17 June 1993
	6	(Angola)	Pascalina Dias			32 – 15 September 1992
	7	(Angola)	Ruth Paím			28 – 11 July 1996
	8	(Angola)	Stella Longue
C	9	(Angola)	Luísa Cutano			35 – 15 January 1990
	11	(Angola)	Maria Vunge			38 – 4 April 1987
	12	(Angola)	Elsinha Zuluca
C	14	(Angola)	Maria Fula			31 – 18 April 1994
	16	(Angola)	Leopoldina Emídio			28 – 23 March 1997
C	17	(Democratic Republic of the Congo)	Mireille Tshiyoyo	1.88 m (6 ft 2 in)		36 – 25 November 1988
	18	(Angola)	Madalena Valentim			32 – 1 April 1993
		(Angola)	Helena Francisco			31 – 1 August 1993

Head coach

- (Angola) Fernando Figueiredo

Assistant coach(es)

- (Angola) Joana Baptista
- (Angola) Júlia Machado

Legend

- (C) Team captain
- Injured

Updated as of July 3rd, 2016

== Manager history ==
- Alexandre Neto 2004

== Players ==
C.D. Maculusso basketball players 2011–2018

Nat	#	Name	A	P	H	W	Elvino Dias				F. F.	–	–
Nat	#	Name	A	P	H	W	2012	2013	2014	2015	2016	2017	2018
Nat	#	Name	A	P	H	W	–	–	–	–	–	–	–
(Angola)	⋅	Analzira Américo	24	G	⋅	⋅	⋅	⋅	5	⋅	5	5	⋅
(Angola)	⋅	Cláudia Dundão	24	⋅	⋅	⋅	⋅	⋅	4	⋅	⋅	⋅	⋅
(Angola)	⋅	Elsa Doneth	20	⋅	⋅	⋅	⋅	⋅	7	⋅	⋅	⋅	⋅
(Angola)	⋅	Elsa Eduardo	24	⋅	⋅	⋅	2012	2013	⋅	⋅	⋅	⋅	⋅
(Angola)	⋅	Elsinha Zuluca	⋅	⋅	⋅	⋅	⋅	⋅	⋅	⋅	12	⋅	⋅
(Angola)	⋅	Emanuela Mateus	17	⋅	⋅	⋅	⋅	⋅	–	⋅	⋅	–	⋅
(Angola)	⋅	Etelvina Chiquel	⋅	⋅	⋅	⋅	2012	2013	15	⋅	⋅	⋅	⋅
(Angola)	⋅	Eva Silva	27	⋅	⋅	⋅	2012	2013	⋅	⋅	⋅	⋅	⋅
(Angola)	⋅	Feliciana Zuluca	22	⋅	⋅	⋅	⋅	⋅	⋅	⋅	⋅	12	⋅
(Angola)	⋅	Flora Bernardo	27	⋅	⋅	⋅	⋅	⋅	⋅	⋅	⋅	18	⋅
(Angola)	⋅	Francisca Mateus	22	⋅	⋅	⋅	⋅	⋅	⋅	⋅	⋅	–	⋅
(Angola)	⋅	Helena Franciso	23	⋅	⋅	⋅	⋅	⋅	⋅	⋅	–	15	⋅
(Angola)	⋅	Jaqueline	⋅	⋅	⋅	⋅	⋅	⋅	⋅	⋅	⋅	10	⋅
(Angola)	⋅	Joana Baptista	26	⋅	⋅	⋅	2012	2013	10	⋅	⋅	⋅	⋅
(Angola)	⋅	Leopoldina Emídio	19	⋅	⋅	⋅	⋅	⋅	⋅	⋅	16	⋅	⋅
(Angola)	⋅	Luísa Capalo	⋅	⋅	⋅	⋅	2012	2013	⋅	⋅	⋅	⋅	⋅
(Angola)	⋅	Luísa Cutano	26	C	⋅	⋅	2012	2013	⋅	⋅	9	⋅	⋅
(Angola)	⋅	Madalena Valentim	23	⋅	⋅	⋅	⋅	⋅	⋅	⋅	18	⋅	⋅
(Angola)	⋅	Maria Fula	23	C	⋅	⋅	⋅	⋅	⋅	⋅	14	14	⋅
(Angola)	⋅	Maria João	⋅	⋅	⋅	⋅	⋅	⋅	⋅	⋅	⋅	11	⋅
(Angola)	⋅	Maria Vunge	29	⋅	⋅	⋅	2012	2013	11	⋅	11	⋅	⋅
(Angola)	⋅	Marisa Nsiame	27	⋅	⋅	⋅	2012	2013	⋅	⋅	⋅	⋅	⋅
(Angola)	⋅	Merciana Fernandes	21	⋅	⋅	⋅	2012	2013	⋅	⋅	⋅	⋅	⋅
(Democratic Republic of the Congo)	⋅	Mireille Tshiyoyo	29	C	1.88	⋅	⋅	⋅	⋅	⋅	17	17	⋅
(Angola)	⋅	Mpinda Yolanda	⋅	⋅	⋅	⋅	2012	2013	⋅	⋅	⋅	⋅	⋅
(Angola)	⋅	Nazaré João	23	⋅	⋅	⋅	⋅	⋅	16	⋅	⋅	⋅	⋅
(Angola)	⋅	Pascalina Dias	25	⋅	⋅	⋅	⋅	⋅	⋅	⋅	6	6	⋅
(Angola)	⋅	Rosemira Daniel	20	⋅	⋅	⋅	⋅	2013	⋅	⋅	⋅	⋅	⋅
(Angola)	⋅	Ruth Paím	21	⋅	⋅	⋅	⋅	⋅	–	⋅	7	7	⋅
(Angola)	⋅	Samba Eduardo	26	⋅	⋅	⋅	2012	2013	⋅	⋅	⋅	⋅	⋅
(Angola)	⋅	Stella Longue	⋅	⋅	⋅	⋅	⋅	⋅	⋅	⋅	8	⋅	⋅

C.D. Maculusso basketball players 2001–2010

Nat	Name	A	P	H	?			A.N.	?		F.F.		J. Santos																
Nat	Name	A	P	H	01	02	03	04	05	06	07	08	09	10															
Nat	Name	A	P	H	01	02	03	04	05	06	07	08	09	10	(Angola)	Catarina Camufal	24	G	1.68	⋅	⋅	⋅	2004	⋅	⋅	⋅	⋅	⋅	⋅
(Angola)	Celina da Conceição		C		⋅	⋅	⋅	2004	⋅	⋅	⋅	⋅	⋅	⋅															
(Angola)	Edna Pedro				⋅	⋅	⋅	⋅	⋅	⋅	⋅	2008	⋅	⋅															
(Angola)	Elsa Eduardo	24			⋅	⋅	⋅	⋅	⋅	⋅	⋅	2008	⋅	⋅															
(Angola)	Eva Silva	–			⋅	⋅	⋅	2004	⋅	⋅	⋅	2008	2009	⋅															
(Angola)	Felizarda Jorge	–			⋅	⋅	⋅	2004	⋅	⋅	⋅	2008	2009	⋅															
(Angola)	Joana Baptista				⋅	⋅	⋅	⋅	⋅	⋅	⋅	⋅	2009	⋅															
(Angola)	Luísa Capalo				⋅	⋅	⋅	⋅	⋅	⋅	⋅	2008	⋅	⋅															
(Angola)	Madalena Muhongo	–	G		⋅	⋅	⋅	2004	⋅	⋅	⋅	2008	⋅	⋅															
(Angola)	Marisa Nsiame	–			⋅	⋅	⋅	⋅	⋅	⋅	⋅	2008	⋅	⋅															
(Angola)	Rosi Pereira				⋅	⋅	⋅	2004	⋅	⋅	⋅	⋅	⋅	⋅															
(Angola)	Samba Eduardo	–			⋅	⋅	⋅	⋅	⋅	⋅	⋅	2008	⋅	⋅															
(Angola)	Teresa Gonçalves		F		⋅	⋅	⋅	2004	⋅	⋅	⋅	⋅	⋅	⋅															
(Angola)	Vera Miguel	–			⋅	⋅	⋅	⋅	⋅	⋅	⋅	2008	⋅	⋅															

== See also ==
- Angola Women's League
- Federação Angolana de Basquetebol
