= Pavilhão Victorino Cunha =

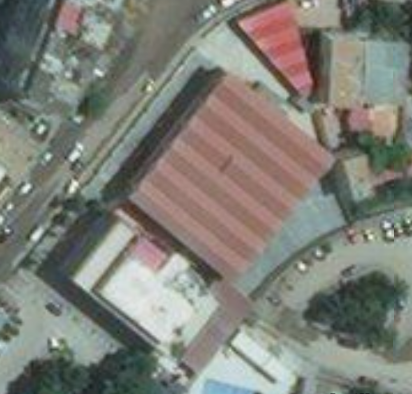
- Interactive map of Pavilhão Victorino Cunha
- Former names: Pavilhão do CODENM; Pavilhão do Rio Seco
- Location: Bairro da Maianga; Corner of Rua Aires de Menezes and Rua do Padre Francisco Gouveia
- Coordinates: 8.828487°S 13.227153°E
- Capacity: 1500
- Surface: Hardwood
- Scoreboard: Electronic

Construction
- Renovated: 1 August 2013; 13 years ago

Pavilhão Victorino Cunha, formerly Pavilhão do CODENM a.k.a. Pavilhão do Rio Seco is the Arena of Angolan side Primeiro de Agosto, mainly used for its Men's and Women's basketball teams. The arena is located in the uptown neighborhood of Maianga.

On August 1, 2013, on the occasion of the 36th anniversary of Clube Desportivo Primeiro de Agosto, the club honored the mentor of the basketball development in the club, Victorino Cunha, by renaming the main basketball arena as Pavilhão Victorino Cunha.

== See also ==
Victorino Cunha
